= Session Moth Martina =

Irish professional wrestler

Martina
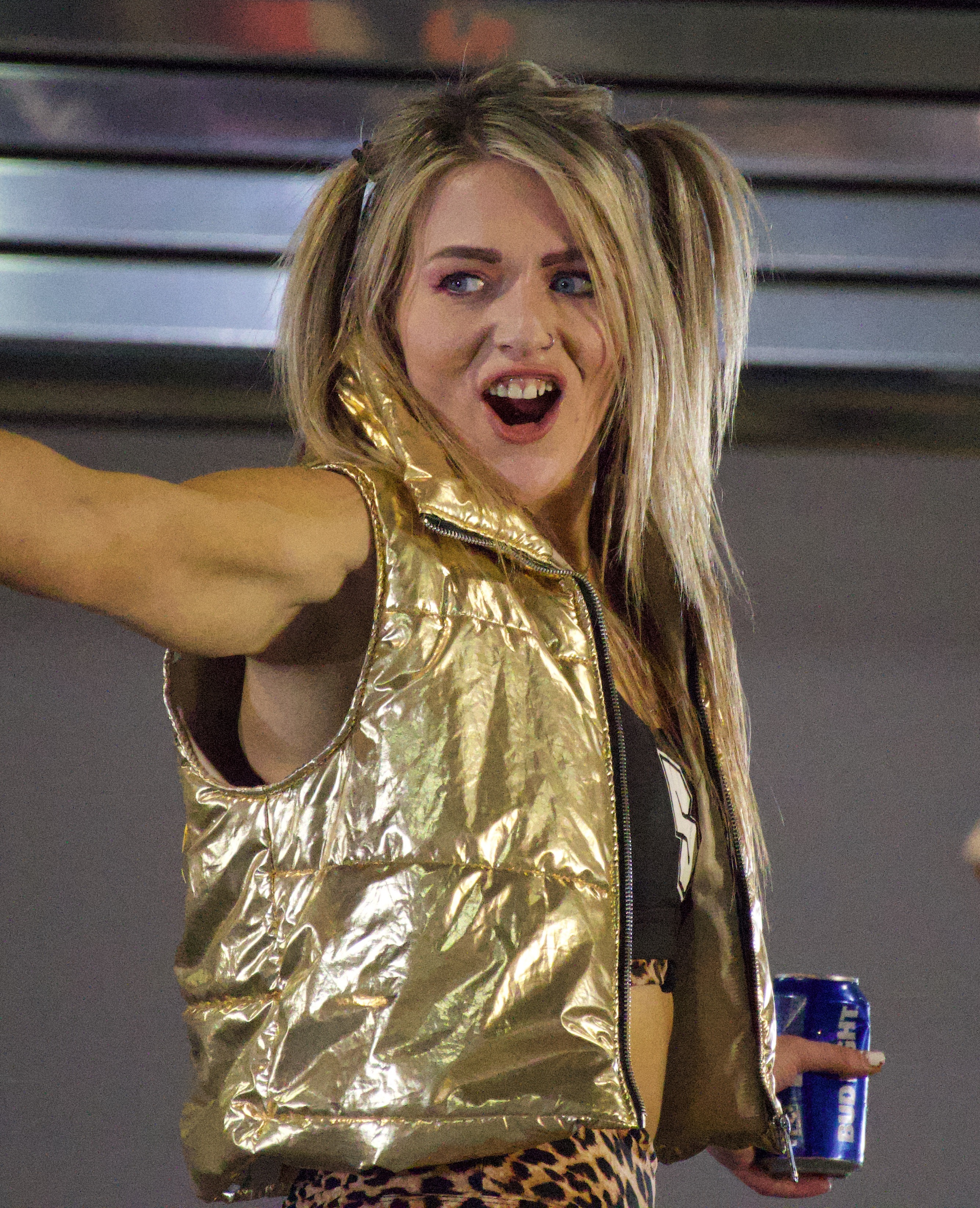
- Martina in April 2024

Personal information
- Born: Karen Glennon; 11 November 1990 (age 35) Dublin, Ireland

Professional wrestling career
- Ring name(s): Fancy Maruyama; Kazza G Klassy Karen; Martina; Session Moth Martina; Session Goth Martina
- Billed height: 1.67 m (5 ft 5 1/2 in)
- Billed weight: 63 kg (139 lb)
- Trained by: Joey Cabray
- Debut: 2011

Karen Glennon, better known by the ring name Session Moth Martina, is an Irish professional wrestler and valet. She currently performs on the British Independent circuit.

She is best known for her appearances in Over the Top Wrestling (OTT), Progress Wrestling, Stardom, Insane Championship Wrestling.

== Professional wrestling career ==
=== Independent circuit (2017–2018) ===
Martina entered the Natural Progression Series IV Tournament where she made her debut for Progress Wrestling on 26 February 2017 but was defeated by Dahlia Black.

Martina made her Insane Championship Wrestling (ICW) debut at ICW Fight Club - It's Always Raining In Glasgow on 21 January 2018, defeating Kasey and Ravie Davie. On 11 February 2019, at ICW 7th Annual Square Go!, Martina defeated Kasey Owens for the ICW Women's Championship. However, the next day, Martina lost the title versus Viper.

=== World Wonder Ring Stardom (2018-2020) ===
In 2018, Martina debut in World Wonder Ring Stardom where she was integrated in to the stable Oedo Tai. At Mask Fiesta 2018 on October 28, 2018, Martina, under the ring name Fancy Maruyama, donned a mask and teamed up with Natsuki Urabe, Reo Hazuki and Yukari Ishino in a loss to Black Fuzzy Peach, Masked Wan-chan, Mini Iotica and Red Snake.

=== Ring of Honor (2019–2022) ===
On 11 September 2019 it was reported that Martina had signed to Ring of Honor (ROH) after turning down a WWE contract following much-hyped tryouts. She made her official Ring of Honor debut at their Free Enterprise event on 9 February 2020, when she defeated Sumie Sakai. As ROH came to a close Martina was referred to as "The Most Charismatic Women's Wrestler Not In WWE Or AEW."

=== All Elite Wrestling ===
In March 2022 it was revealed that Martina was making her first appearance with All Elite Wrestling (AEW) on AEW Dark: Elevation in a match against Ruby Soho, who she eventually lost to.

== Championships and accomplishments ==
- Attack! Pro Wrestling
  - Attack! 24:7 Championship (1 time)
- Community Pro Wrestling
  - CPW Women's Championship (1 time, current)
- Discovery Wrestling
  - DW Women's Championship (1 time, current)
- Flemish Wrestling Force
  - FWF Tag Team Championship (1 time) - with Jungle Jill
- Insane Championship Wrestling
  - ICW Women's Championship (1 time)
- No Limit Wrestling
  - NLW Women's Championship (2 times, current)
- Over the Top Wrestling
  - OTT Gender Neutral Championship (3 times, current)
  - OTT Women's Championship (3 times, inaugural)
  - OTT Women's Title Tournament (2016)
- Pro Wrestling Allstars
  - PWA Queen Of Diamonds Championship (1 time)
- Pro Wrestling Cyprus
  - PWC Ladies Championship (1 time, current)
- Pro-Wrestling: EVE
  - SHE-1 (2026)
  - Pro-Wrestling: EVE Championship (1 time)
- Pro Wrestling Illustrated
  - Ranked No. 82 of the top 100 female singles wrestlers in the PWI Women's 100 in 2020
- Phoenix Wrestling/Rebel County Wrestling
  - Phoenix Hard Knox Championship (1 time, inaugural)
  - RCW Trios Championship (1 time, current) - with Cian Gallachini and Katey Harvey
- Ring of Honor
  - ROH Year-End Award (1 time)
    - Female Wrestler of the Year (2020)
- Riot Cabaret Pro Wrestling
  - Riot Cabaret Tag Team Championship (1 time) - with Charles Crowley
- Southside Wrestling Entertainment
  - SWE Tag Team Championship (1 time) – with Lana Austin
- TNT Extreme Wrestling
  - TNT Women's Championship (1 time)
  - Total Carnage Tournament (2021)

== Personal life ==
Martina is the niece of veteran RTÉ News broadcaster Colm Murray through her mother Mary.
