= ICW Women's Championship =

Professional wrestling women's championship

ICW Women's World Championship

Details
- Promotion: Insane Championship Wrestling
- Date established: November 15, 2015
- Current champion: Molly Spartan
- Date won: June 21, 2026
Statistics
- First champion: Viper
- Most reigns: Kasey Owens and Kay Lee Ray (3 times)
- Longest reign: Rhio (553 days)
- Shortest reign: Martina (1 day)

The ICW Women's World Championship is a women's professional wrestling championship owned by Scotland's Insane Championship Wrestling promotion. The current champion is Molly Spartan, who is in her second reign. She won the title by defeating Angel Hayze at Insane NORTH Weekender - Night 1 (a joint show between ICW and NORTH Wrestling) in Newcastle, England on June 21, 2026.

== History ==
The title was first announced by then ICW General Manager, Red Lightning, on May 31, 2015, with an 8 women tournament being held over the coming months. The final took place at Fear & Loathing VIII on November 15, 2015, with Viper (who had been added to the match by ICW Commissioner, Mick Foley) emerging victorious and becoming the inaugural ICW Women's Champion.

=== ICW Women's Championship Tournament (2021) ===
Quarter Final
Molly Spartan	Pin
Gia Adams	7:50
Emily Hayden	3:06
Rhio	Pin
Angel Hayze	Pin
Ellie Armstrong	8:37
Anastasia	8:02
Kasey	Pin

Semifinals
Molly Spartan	Pin
Rhio	6:22
Angel Hayze	Pin
Kasey	7:30

Finals
Molly Spartan	11:33
Angel Hayze	Pin

== Reigns ==
Key
No.	Overall reign number
Reign	Reign number for the specific champion
Days	Number of days held
+	Current reign is changing daily

No.	Champion	Championship change			Reign statistics		Notes	Ref.
No.	Champion	Date	Event	Location	Reign	Days	Notes	Ref.
1	Viper	November 15, 2015	Fear & Loathing VIII	Glasgow, Scotland	1	49	Viper, added to the match by ICW Commissioner Mick Foley, defeated Kay Lee Ray and Nikki Storm in a three–way match to become the inaugural champion	
2	Carmel Jacob	January 3, 2016	Friday Night Fight Club	Glasgow, Scotland	1	322	This was a four–way match also involving Nikki Storm and Kay Lee Ray	
3	Kay Lee Ray	November 20, 2016	Fear & Loathing IX	Glasgow, Scotland	1	251	This was a three–way match also involving Viper	
4	Kasey Owens	July 29, 2017	Shug's Hoose Party 4 - Night I	Glasgow, Scotland	1	64		
5	Kay Lee Ray	January 10, 2017	Fight Club	Glasgow, Scotland	2	49		
6	Kasey Owens	November 19, 2017	Fear & Loathing X	Glasgow, Scotland	2	84	This was a three–way steel cage match also involving Viper	
7	Martina	February 11, 2018	7th Annual Square Go!	Glasgow, Scotland	1	1		
8	Viper	February 12, 2018	The Biggest Fight Club EVER!	Glasgow, Scotland	2	293		
9	Kay Lee Ray	December 2, 2018	Fear & Loathing XI	Glasgow, Scotland	3	216	This was a Queen of Insanity match	
10	Kasey Owens	July 6, 2019	Fight Club	Glasgow, Scotland	3	120	This was a three–way match also involving Aivil	
11	Aivil	November 3, 2019	Fear & Loathing XII - Night II	Glasgow, Scotland	1	119		
—	Vacated	March 1, 2020	Fight Club	Glasgow, Scotland	—	—	Vacated due to an injury	
12	Angel Hayze	November 20, 2021	Fear & Loathing XIII - Night I	Glasgow, Scotland	1	155	Defeated Molly Spartan in a tournament final to win the vacant title	
13	Molly Spartan	April 24, 2022	ICW Barred II	Glasgow, Scotland	1	308	This was a Steel Cage match	
14	Rhio	February 26, 2023	The 11th Annual Square Go!	Glasgow, Scotland	1	553		
15	Lana Austin	September 1, 2024	ICW Barred III	Glasgow, Scotland	1	462	This was a Steel Cage match.	
16	Angel Hayze	December 7, 2025	Fear & Loathing XVII	Glasgow, Scotland	2	196	This was a three–way Ladder match that also involved Daisy Jenkins	
17	Molly Spartan	June 21, 2026	Insane NORTH Weekender - Night 2	Newcastle, England	2	143+		

== Combined reigns ==
As of November 11, 2026.

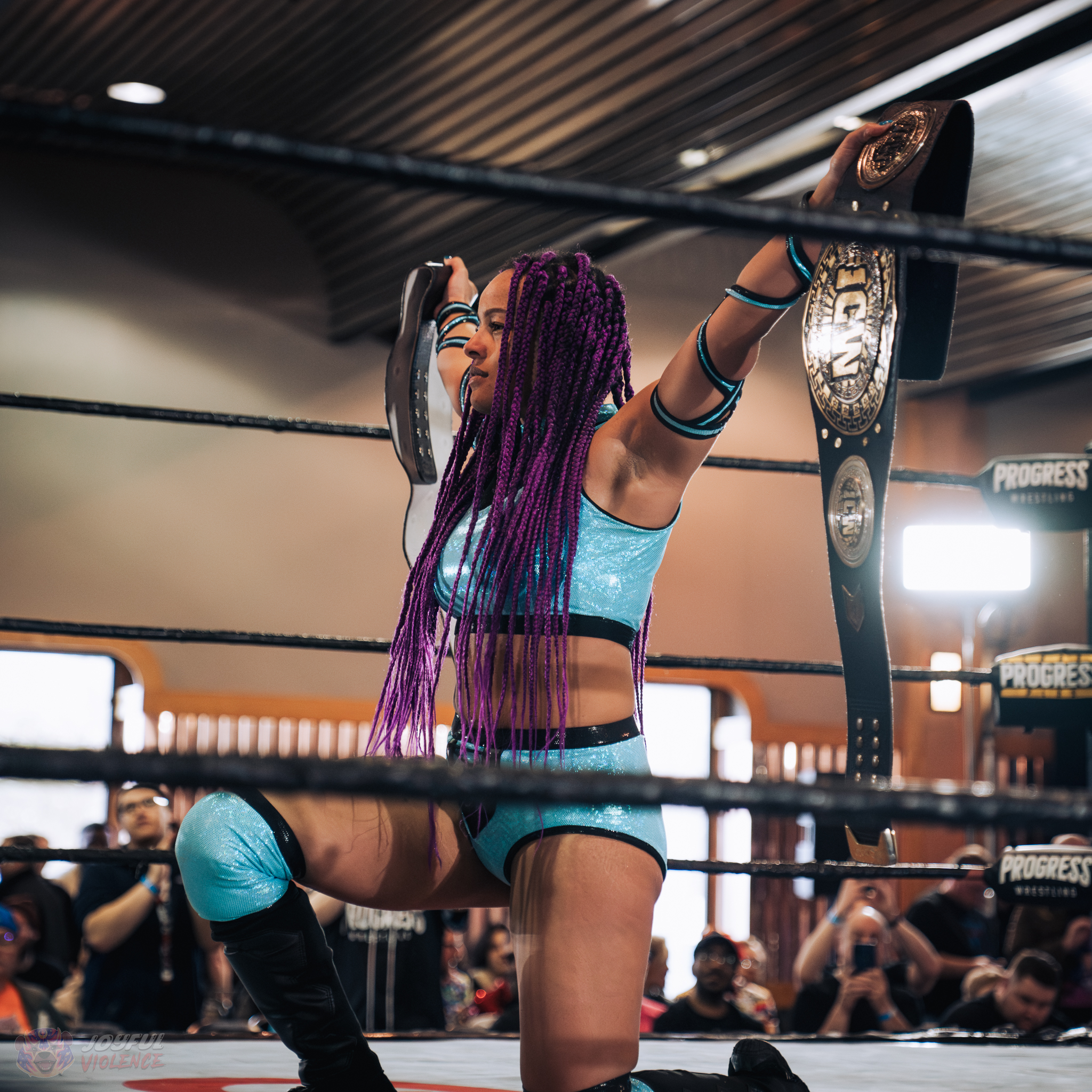
Longest-reigning champion Rhio.

†	Indicates the current champion

Rank	Wrestler	No. of reigns	Combined days
1	Rhio	1	553
2	Kay Lee Ray	3	516
3	Lana Austin	1	462
4	Molly Spartan †	2	451+
5	Angel Hayze	2	351
6	Viper	2	342
7	Carmel Jacob	1	322
8	Kasey Owens	3	268
9	Aivil	1	119
10	Martina	1	1

== See also ==
- Insane Championship Wrestling
- ICW World Heavyweight Championship
- ICW Zero-G Championship
- ICW Tag Team Championship
