= Alexa Bliss =

American professional wrestler (born 1991)

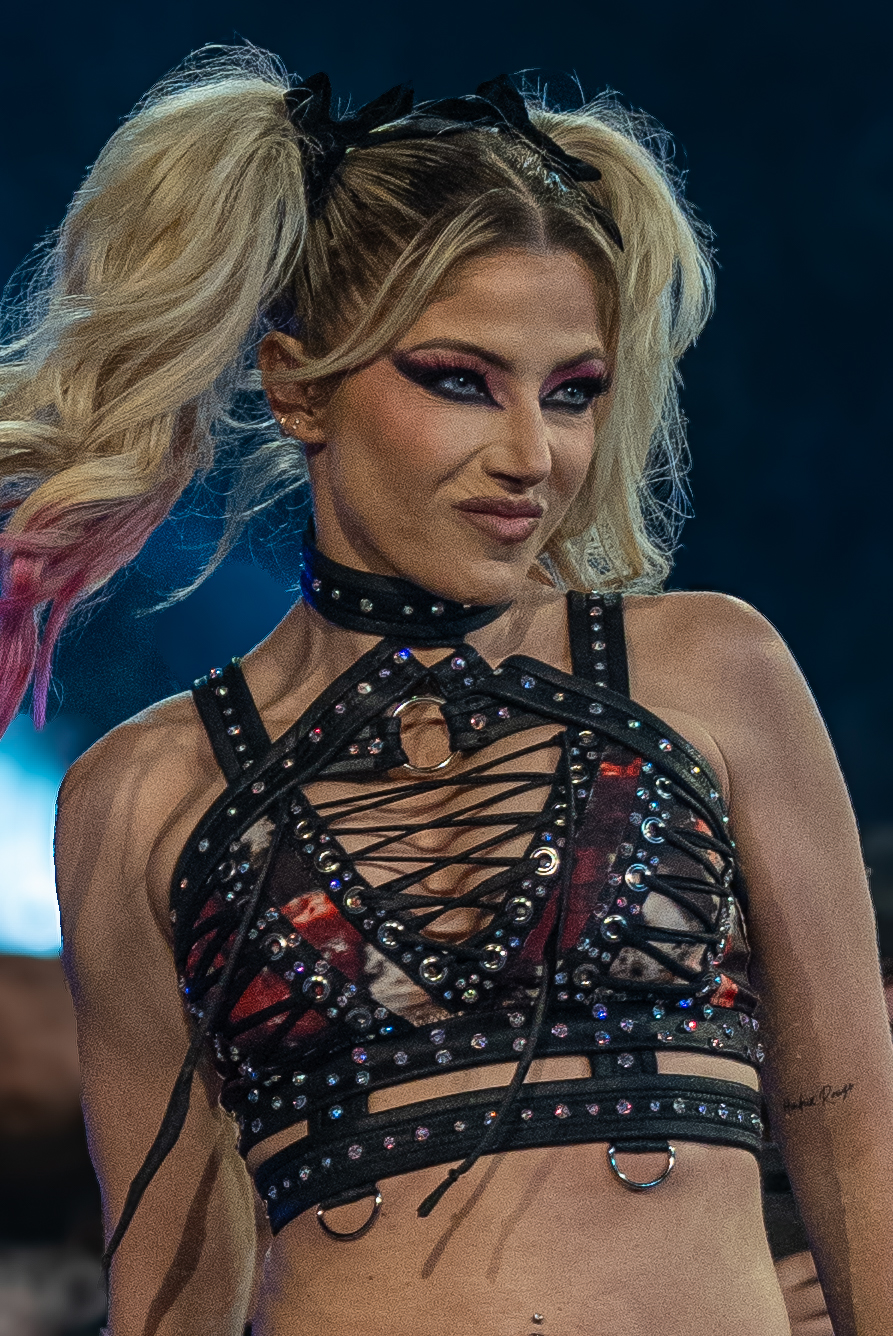
- Bliss in 2025

Personal information
- Born: Alexis Kaufman; August 9, 1991 (age 35) Columbus, Ohio, US
- Education: Ohio State University (BS); University of Akron (MA)
- Spouse: Ryan Cabrera (m. 2022)
- Children: 1

Professional wrestling career
- Ring name(s): Alexa Bliss; La Luchadora
- Billed height: 5 ft 1 in (155 cm)
- Billed weight: 102 lb (46 kg)
- Billed from: Columbus, Ohio
- Trained by: Mike Quackenbush; WWE Performance Center
- Debut: September 20, 2013

Signature
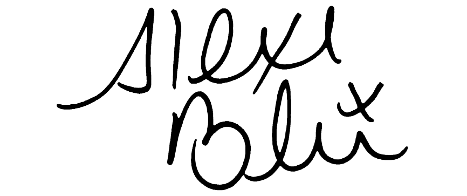

Alexis Cabrera (née Kaufman; born August 9, 1991) is an American professional wrestler. She has been signed to WWE since May 2013, where she performs on the SmackDown brand under the ring name Alexa Bliss.

In 2013, Bliss signed a contract with WWE and was assigned to its developmental brand NXT. She made her main roster debut on the SmackDown brand in 2016, later becoming a two-time SmackDown Women's Champion and the first woman to hold the title twice. Bliss was then drafted to the Raw brand in 2017, where she went on to become a three-time Raw Women's Champion, with her initial reign making her the first woman to win both the Raw and SmackDown Women's titles. She is also a former five-time WWE Women's Tag Team Champion, making Bliss the second Women's Triple Crown Champion and a one-time WWE 24/7 Champion. In 2018, she won both the second women's Money in the Bank ladder match and first women's Elimination Chamber match.

Bliss was a main cast member on the reality television series Total Divas. She also appeared as a contestant on the ninth season of the competition series The Masked Singer.

== Early life ==
Alexis Kaufman was born on August 9, 1991, in Columbus, Ohio, to teenage parents who were still in high school at the time of her birth. She has been involved in sports since the age of five, competing in track and field, softball, and gymnastics. She was also a cheerleader at Hilliard Davidson High School and reached Division I status at the University of Akron, where she graduated with an M.A. in medical dietetics. She spent time in competitive fitness competitions, and has competed in the Arnold Classic. At the age of 15, she had a life-threatening eating disorder, but turning to fitness competitions helped her overcome it. With her parents' permission, she also received breast augmentation when she was 17 to help overcome her eating disorders by making her feel more feminine, as her breasts stayed small naturally when she finished puberty and helped contribute to her eating disorders.

== Professional wrestling career ==
=== WWE ===
==== NXT (2013–2016) ====
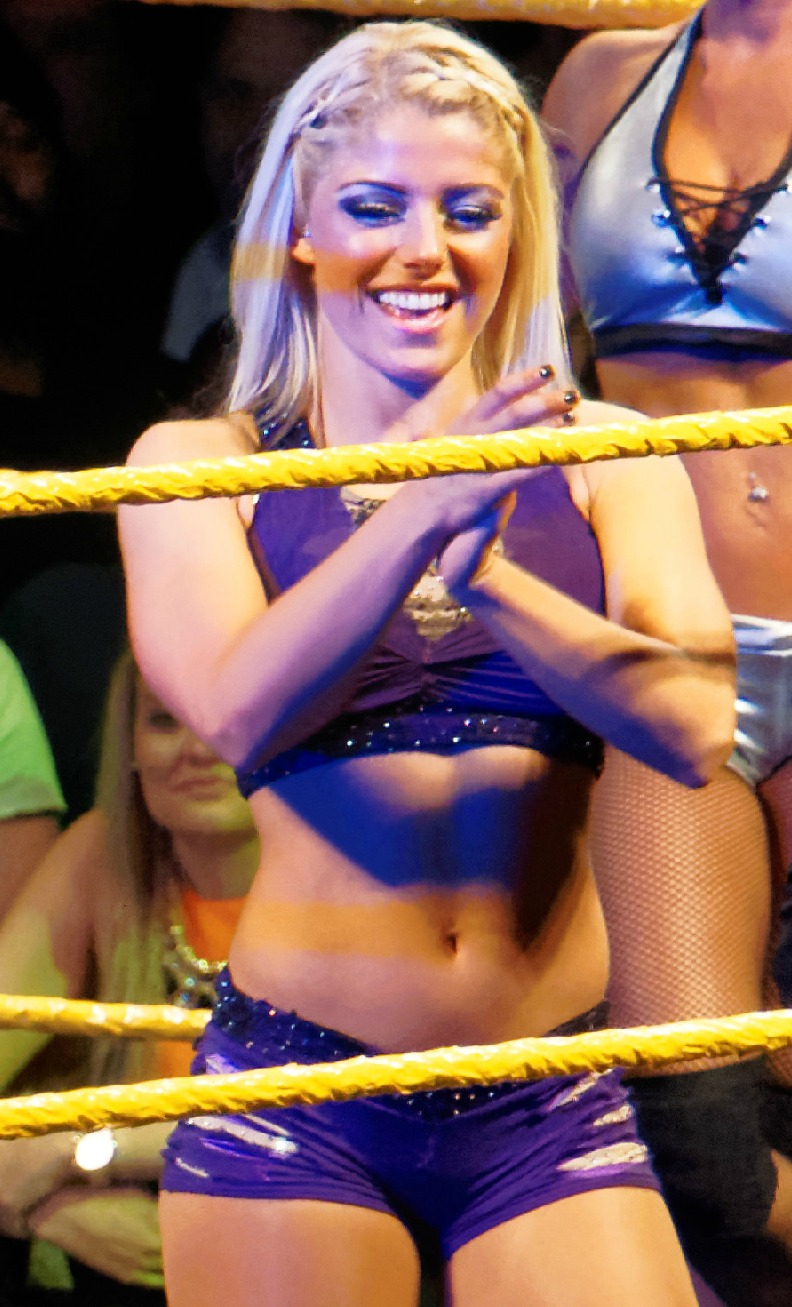
Bliss in March 2015

Having no prior wrestling training, Kaufman was signed by WWE in May 2013 and reported to WWE's developmental territory NXT. On the July 24 episode of NXT (which was taped on June 20), she made her first televised appearance, congratulating the inaugural NXT Women's Champion Paige. In August, she was added to WWE.com's NXT roster page and assigned the ring name Alexa Bliss. She acted as an unnamed ring announcer for the November 20 episode of NXT. Her first televised appearance on the main roster came at WrestleMania XXX on April 6, 2014, when she played a part in Triple H's entrance. She made her televised in-ring debut on the May 8 episode of NXT, playing a glitter fairy gimmick with her ring entrance set to the theme track "Bling Bling," competing in a tournament for the vacant NXT Women's Championship. She defeated former Divas Champion Alicia Fox in the first round, but lost to Charlotte in the semi-finals. On the September 25 episode of NXT, a new ring entrance theme track "Blissful" was debuted for the first time with her match against Bayley. After a failed Double-Knees attempt, Bliss lost to a Bayley-to-Belly suplex.

After a hiatus due to a legit injury, Bliss returned on the March 11, 2015, episode of NXT, where she defeated Carmella. The following week on NXT, she defeated NXT Women's Champion Sasha Banks by countout in a non-title match, which led to Bliss being granted a title match against Banks on the March 25 episode of NXT, which she lost. Bliss had an altercation with Carmella backstage on the April 29 episode of NXT. After being slapped, Bliss was consoled by NXT Tag Team Champions Buddy Murphy and Wesley Blake who were standing in the background. On May 13 episode of NXT, Bliss landed a Sparkle Splash and defeated Carmella after Blake and Murphy set up a distraction. On May 20 at NXT TakeOver: Unstoppable, Bliss helped Blake and Murphy retain the NXT Tag Team Championship against Colin Cassady and Enzo Amore, forming an alliance with them and turning into a villainess character for the first time in her WWE career. On the May 27 airing of NXT, in a non-title tag team match against Elias Samson and Mike Rallis, Blake and Murphy were accompanied to the ring by Bliss, who had now changed the blue in her hair to red, as well as changed her ring attire to a red two-piece with matching name and markings to the Blake and Murphy ring gear. For this match Blake and Murphy won, and as an act of humiliation Bliss hit a Sparkle Splash to the incapacitated Elias. With the effects of Takeover: Unstoppable still fresh, Bliss had a singles match with Carmella on the June 3 episode of NXT. Starting with this match, "Opposite Ends Of The World" would be the theme track that was also used for Bliss to make her entrances, and she was accompanied by Blake and Murphy, who remained ringside for the duration of this match. Bliss won this encounter by securing a Roll-up and grabbing the second rope for additional leverage. On the July 29 episode of NXT, Bliss helped Blake and Murphy retain the NXT Tag Team Championship against The Vaudevillains (Aiden English and Simon Gotch) and slapped both English and Gotch after the match. The Vaudevillians were granted a rematch for the NXT Tag Team Championship against Blake and Murphy at NXT TakeOver: Brooklyn on August 22, which they won after Blue Pants stopped Bliss from providing a distraction during the match. For this Takeover appearance, Bliss incorporated her signature skeleton gloves for the very first time on air. The interruptions at Brooklyn led to a match between the two, where Bliss would go on to defeat Blue Pants in a singles match on the September 2 episode of NXT. For this match she added her signature hand gesture to her entrance that she went on to use extensively for the next five years.

Throughout October and November, Bliss was involved in a feud with Bayley over the NXT Women's Championship. On the November 18 episode of NXT, while cutting a promo about her upcoming main event match with Bayley, a referee came by to say that per William Regal, Blake and Murphy would be banned from ringside for this match. When it came time for Alexa's entrance, a brand new theme track, "Spiteful" was introduced for the first time. Bliss was unsuccessful at capturing the title as Bayley slapped Bliss, then hit a Bayley-to-Belly Suplex to retain. On the January 13, 2016, episode of NXT, Bliss competed in a number one contender's battle royal, but lost. On May 18 episode of NXT, Bliss and Blake abandoned Murphy, officially disbanding the trio. On the May 25 episode of NXT, Bliss competed in a triple threat match against Carmella and Nia Jax to determine the number one contender to Asuka's NXT Women's Championship, which was won by Jax. On the July 6 episode of NXT, in a match against Bayley, Bliss debuted the Goddess ring attire. The match ended when Bayley executed a Bayley-to-Belly Suplex and secured the pinfall victory. On the August 17 episode of NXT, Bliss competed in a six-woman tag team match along with Daria Berenato and Mandy Rose, in which they were defeated by Carmella, Liv Morgan and Nikki Glencross in what would be also her last match in NXT.

==== SmackDown Women's Champion (2016–2017) ====
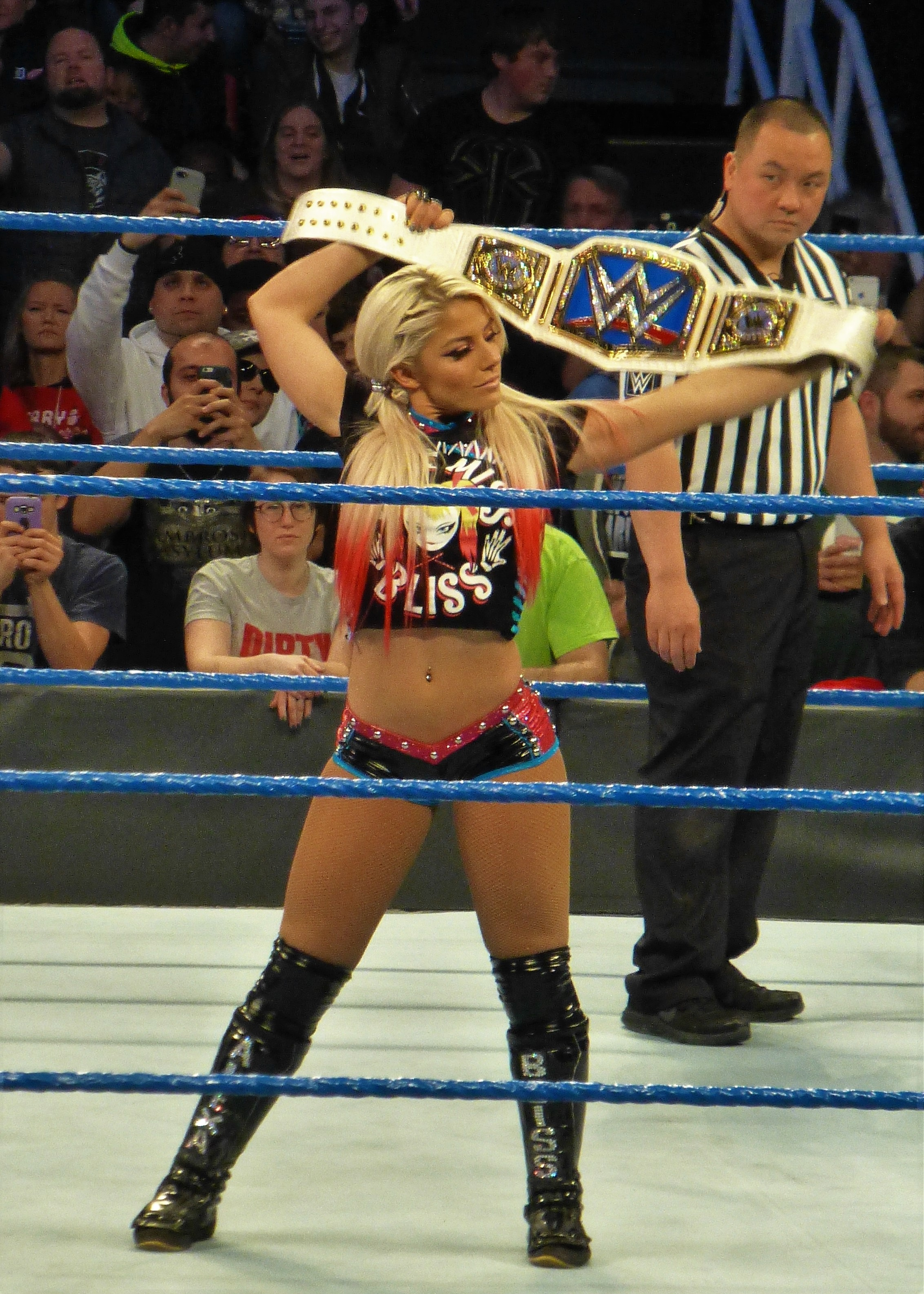
Bliss as SmackDown Women's Champion in December 2016

On July 19, Bliss was drafted to the SmackDown brand as part of the 2016 WWE draft. She made her main roster debut on the July 26 episode of SmackDown in a segment involving the brand's women's division. Bliss achieved her first victory on the main roster by defeating Becky Lynch on the August 9 episode of SmackDown. On August 21 at SummerSlam, she teamed with Natalya and Nikki Bella in a winning effort against Lynch, Carmella and Naomi. On September 11 at Backlash, Bliss competed in a six-pack elimination challenge to determine the inaugural SmackDown Women's Champion, in which she was unsuccessful and was won by Becky Lynch.

On the September 13 episode of SmackDown, Bliss won a fatal five-way match to earn a title match against Lynch at No Mercy on October 9. However, due to Lynch suffering a legit injury, the match was rescheduled for the November 8 episode of SmackDown, where Lynch successfully defended the title against Bliss. Bliss participated in the Raw vs. SmackDown Women's elimination tag team match at Survivor Series on November 20, where her team lost the match. On December 4 at TLC: Tables, Ladders & Chairs, Bliss defeated Lynch in a tables match to become the new SmackDown Women's Champion.

On the January 17, 2017, episode of SmackDown, Bliss successfully defended her title against Lynch in a steel cage match following an interference by the returning Mickie James, who aligned herself with Bliss. On February 12, Bliss dropped the title to Naomi at Elimination Chamber. On the February 21 episode of SmackDown, Bliss defeated Lynch to capture the title for the second time after Naomi was forced to vacate the title due to injury, becoming the first two-time SmackDown Women's Champion. Bliss's partnership with Mickie James dissolved shortly after and the two would face off in a match on SmackDown, with James defeating Bliss. On April 2, Bliss lost the title to Naomi in a six-pack challenge also involving Carmella, James, Lynch and Natalya at WrestleMania 33. Bliss and Naomi faced off in a rematch on the April 4 episode of SmackDown, where Bliss was once again defeated.

==== Raw Women's Champion (2017–2018) ====
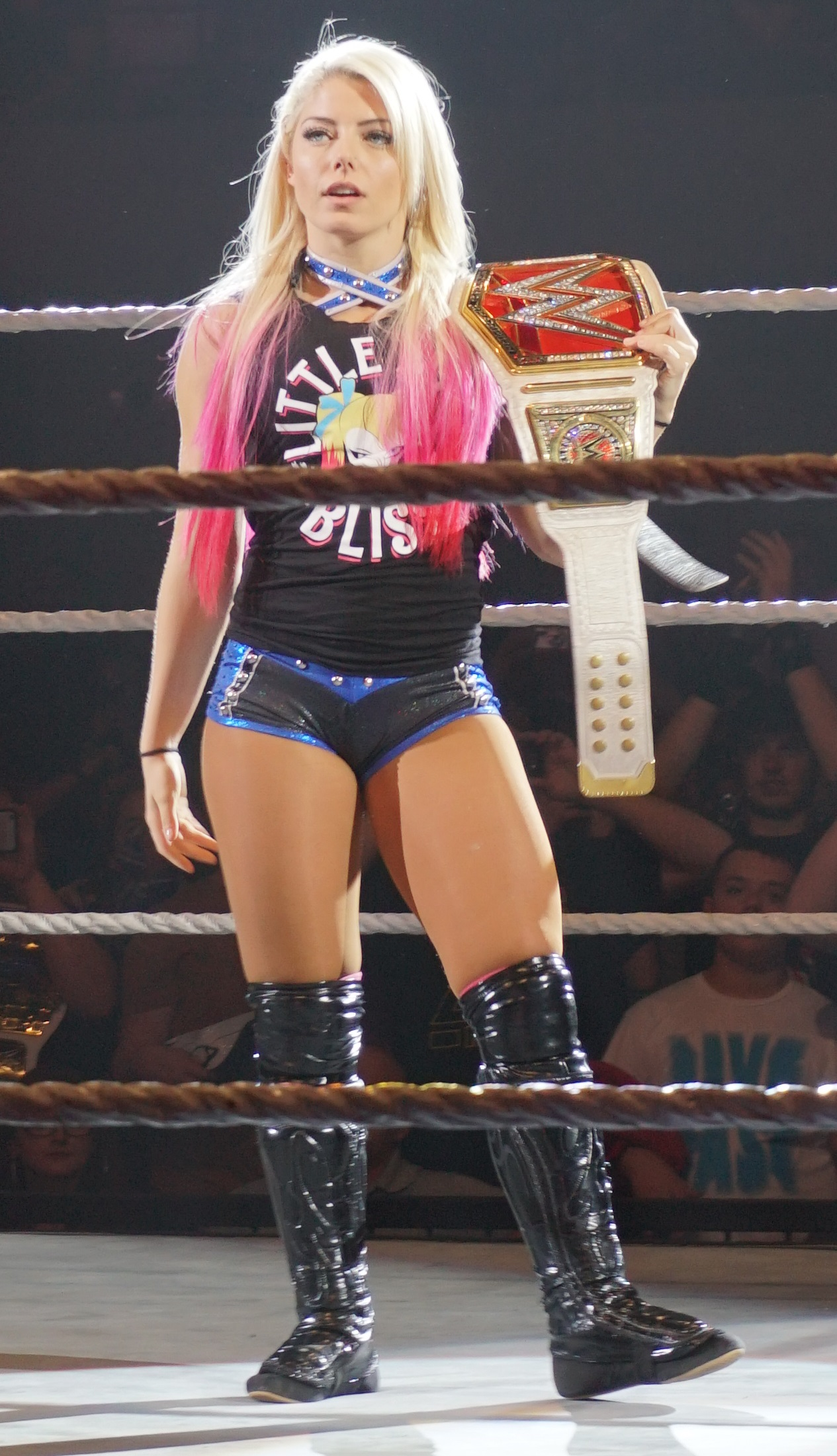
Bliss as Raw Women's Champion in May 2017

On the April 10, 2017, episode of Raw, Bliss was drafted to the Raw brand as part of the Superstar Shake-up, confronting Raw Women's Champion Bayley. A week later, Bliss won a fatal four-way match to become the number one contender for the title. At Payback, on April 30, Bliss defeated Bayley to become the new Raw Women's Champion, becoming the first woman to win the Raw and SmackDown Women's Championships in the process. In a rematch between the two, which took place on June 4 at Extreme Rules, Bliss retained her title over Bayley in a kendo stick-on-a-pole match. Bliss then started a feud with Sasha Banks, whom defeated her on July 9 at Great Balls of Fire via count-out before losing the title to Banks on August 20 at SummerSlam, ending her reign at 112 days. She regained the title eight days later on Raw.

Bliss went on to defend her title on September 24 at No Mercy in a fatal five-way match against Bayley, Nia Jax, Emma, and Sasha Banks. Bliss was then confronted the following night on Raw by Mickie James due to remarks Bliss made about her. At TLC: Tables, Ladders & Chairs, Bliss defeated James to retain the title, and did so again on the October 30 episode of Raw.

On February 25, 2018, at Elimination Chamber, Bliss won the inaugural women's elimination chamber match, after she successfully retained her title. In parallel to her activities as a singles wrestler, she took a part of the Mixed Match Challenge tournament with Braun Strowman as her partner, and the duo was able to qualify to the semi-finals of the tournament, where they were defeated by the eventual winners Asuka and The Miz. On April 8 at WrestleMania 34, Bliss lost the title to Nia Jax, ending her reign at 223 days. On May 6 at Backlash, Bliss invoked her rematch clause and challenged Nia Jax for the title; however, she was unsuccessful and suffered a shoulder injury during the match.

Shortly after losing the title, in mid-May, Bliss won a triple threat match against Bayley and Mickie James to earn a spot at the Money in the Bank ladder match, which she would go on to win at the event on June 17. That same night, Bliss cashed in her contract on Nia Jax and defeated her, after attacking both Jax and Ronda Rousey, winning the Raw Women's Championship for a third time. This made her the first woman, and third wrestler overall, to cash in the Money in the Bank contract the same night after winning it. At Extreme Rules, Bliss retained the championship against Jax in the inaugural women's extreme rules match, thereby ending their feud. At SummerSlam, on August 19, Bliss lost the championship to Ronda Rousey, ending her reign at 63 days. She failed to regain the title in a rematch at Hell in a Cell the following month.

==== Limited in-ring competition and hosting roles (2018–2019) ====
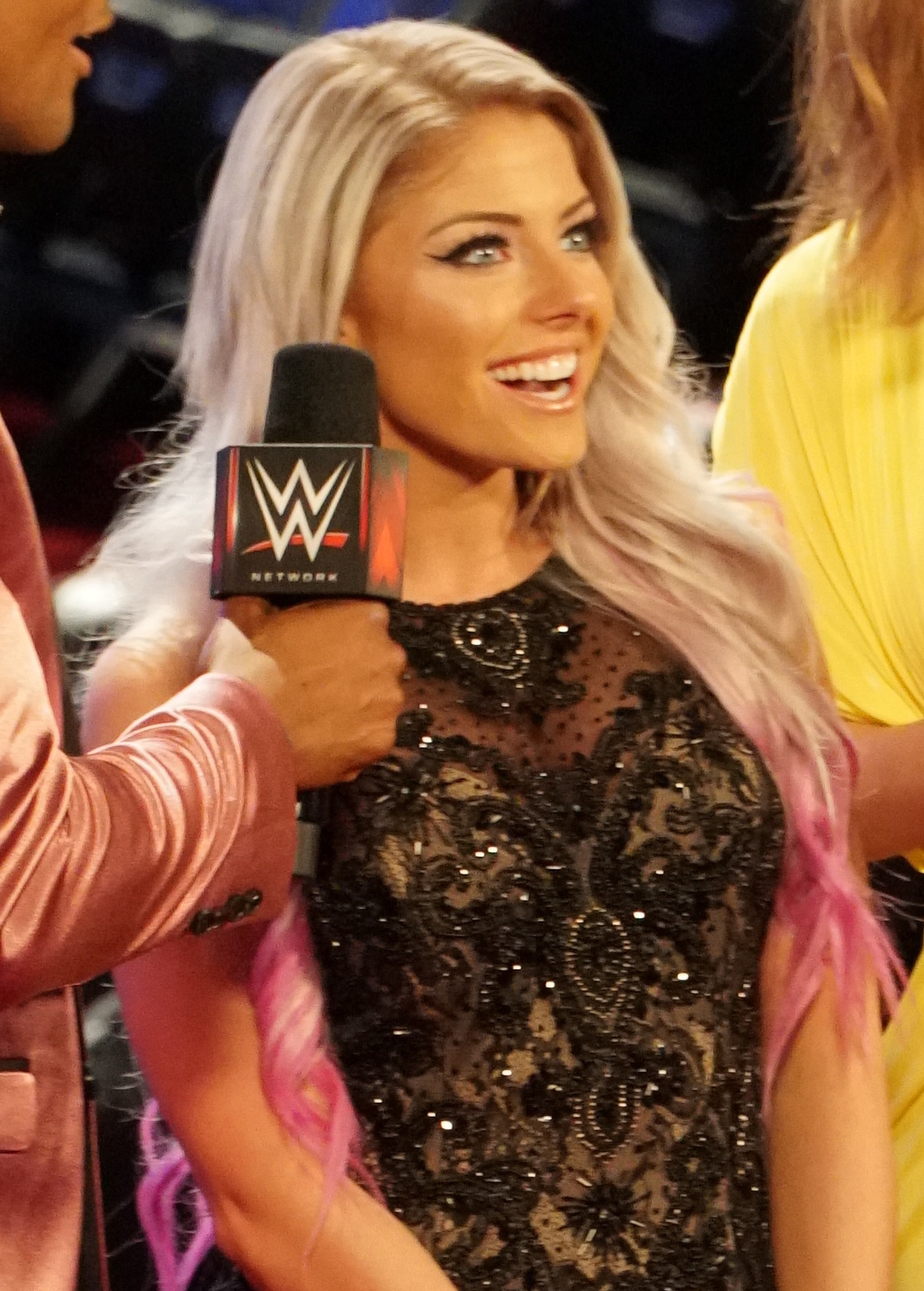
Bliss at the Hall of Fame ceremony in 2018

In October, Bliss and Mickie James started a feud with WWE Hall of Famers Trish Stratus and Lita, which eventually led to the announcement of a tag team match between the two duos at WWE Evolution, the first ever all women's pay-per-view. Just three days before the event, however, on October 25, it was announced that Bliss was pulled off the match due to a concussion she suffered during her match with Ronda at Hell in a Cell and she was replaced by Alicia Fox, however did get to accompany them to ringside. During that time, it was also revealed that Bliss would be taking time off from in-ring competition to heal from various injuries that she had sustained.

A few weeks later, Bliss was announced as the team captain of Team Raw in a non-wrestling role for the traditional interbrand women's five-on-five tag team elimination match at the Survivor Series event, in which they were victorious. The following night, on the November 18 episode of Raw, Bliss was named the new head of the Raw women's division by Acting Raw General Manager Baron Corbin. In December, Bliss's role as well as those of other authority figures on Raw and SmackDown were removed after the McMahon family announced they were taking charge again.

On the January 7, 2019, episode of Raw, Bliss debuted an interview segment titled "A Moment of Bliss", where she interviewed various guests as the segment's host. At Royal Rumble on January 27, after a nearly five month in-ring hiatus, Bliss competed in her first women's Royal Rumble match, lasting 12 minutes and eliminating Ember Moon and Sonya Deville before she was eliminated by Bayley and Carmella. In April, Bliss hosted the WrestleMania 35 event. The following night on Raw, Bliss defeated Bayley in her first singles match since her hiatus from in-ring competition in late 2018. At The Shield's Final Chapter event, Bliss teamed up with Lacey Evans to defeat Dana Brooke and Nikki Cross in a dark match. Shortly thereafter, Bliss was announced as a participant of the annual Money in the Bank ladder match at the namesake pay-per-view. However, she was not medically cleared to compete in time for the event and therefore removed from the match.

==== Teaming with Nikki Cross (2019–2020) ====
In June, Bliss reignited her rivalry with Bayley after she won a triple threat match to become the number one contender for Bayley's SmackDown Women's Championship at Stomping Grounds, where Bliss failed to win the title from Bayley. Following the loss, in her first attempt at capturing the WWE Women's Tag Team Championship, Bliss teamed up with Nikki Cross to challenge The IIconics (Billie Kay and Peyton Royce), during which Bliss and Cross were unsuccessful. Bliss and Cross would challenge Bayley to a two-on-one handicap match at Extreme Rules, where Bayley once again retained the championship by pinning Bliss.

On the August 5 episode of Raw, Bliss and Cross would win the WWE Women's Tag Team Championship from The IIconics in a fatal four-way tag team elimination match also involving The Kabuki Warriors (Asuka and Kairi Sane), and Fire and Desire (Mandy Rose and Sonya Deville). Bliss and Cross retained their titles against Fire and Desire at Clash of Champions. At the Hell in a Cell on October 6, they lost the titles to The Kabuki Warriors after Asuka spat green mist in Cross' face, thus turning them face in the process. This would be Bliss's first time as a face on the main roster. Although drafted separately instead of as a team during the 2019 Draft, Bliss and Cross remained on the Raw brand, but the team was then traded to the SmackDown brand. At Starrcade, Bliss and Cross competed in a fatal four-way tag team match for the Women's Tag Team Championship, but the match was won by defending champions The Kabuki Warriors. At the Royal Rumble on January 26, 2020, Bliss entered the namesake match at number 1, lasting 27 minutes and eliminating Kairi Sane, Mia Yim, and Chelsea Green, but was eliminated by Bianca Belair.

Leading up to WrestleMania 36, Bliss and Cross reignited their feud with The Kabuki Warriors, as Bliss went on to defeat Asuka on the March 27 episode of SmackDown to earn a match for the Women's Tag Team Championship at WrestleMania. At the event, the duo defeated The Kabuki Warriors to win the titles for a second time, becoming the first multi-time WWE Women's Tag Team Champions. On the following SmackDown, they defeated them again in a rematch for their titles, and were subsequently challenged by Carmella and Dana Brooke, against whom they defended the titles on SmackDown two weeks later. On May 18 episode of Raw, Bliss and Cross retained their titles against The IIconics via disqualification, after losing to them in a non-title match the week prior. On the June 6 episode of SmackDown, the duo lost their titles to the team of Bayley and Sasha Banks, making their reign end at 62 days yet again. At Backlash, Bliss and Cross were unsuccessful in regaining their titles in a triple threat tag team match also involving The IIconics, as Banks managed to roll up Bliss for the win.

==== Alliance with "The Fiend" Bray Wyatt (2020–2021) ====
At The Horror Show at Extreme Rules, Bliss appeared during the cinematic match between Braun Strowman and Bray Wyatt. Wyatt used Bliss's image as Strowman had an affection for her. Bliss then became involved in the storyline between Strowman and Wyatt, as she was attacked by Wyatt's alter ego, The Fiend, on the July 31 episode of SmackDown. Bliss's involvement with The Fiend would continue in the coming months, with Bliss going into trance and using his finisher, Sister Abigail.

As part of the 2020 Draft in October, both Bliss and The Fiend were drafted to the Raw brand. On the October 26 episode of Raw, while hosting A Moment of Bliss with special guest Randy Orton, a feud was set off that involved The Fiend as well. During the opening of that segment, Bliss was also given a new ring entrance theme song "The Fury". After the Fiend was written off television, Bliss then took over the feud with Orton, as she wanted him to face the repercussions of his actions at TLC.

At Royal Rumble, she competed in the Women's Royal Rumble match, entering at number 27, but was eliminated by Rhea Ripley after about a minute in the ring. From January to March 2021, Bliss's appearance continually shifted darker as she began to constantly interfere in Orton's matches. This transformation ramped up for her scheduled intergender match against Orton at Fastlane. During the match, she attacked Orton with supernatural powers like making a lighting rig fall and almost land on him and launching a fireball at him. At the end, The Fiend made his return and attacked Orton, allowing Bliss to defeat Orton. At Wrestlemania 37, Bliss was in The Fiend's corner for his match with Orton, but eventually betrayed him by distracting him, allowing Orton to defeat him. On the following Raw, Bliss declared that The Fiend was her mentor, but now she no longer needed him. She then introduced her new friend, a demonic looking doll named Lilly.

==== Various feuds (2021–2023) ====
On the May 31 episode of Raw, Bliss would begin a feud with Shayna Baszler with Baszler claiming that Bliss was the reason why Baszler and Jax lost the WWE Women's Tag Team titles. A match between Baszler and Bliss would then be announced for Hell in a Cell. At the event, Bliss would defeat Baszler. Throughout the month of June, Bliss would take on an ever increasingly darker appearance, and for the June 21 episode of Raw it was announced that Alexa Bliss and Nikki Cross would be in a Money in the Bank Qualifier tag team match against Nia Jax and Shayna Baszler. Bliss and Cross secured the victory after Cross pinned Baszler. This was the first team win for Bliss and Cross since the May 12, 2020 Raw taping (May 18 airing). On the July 12 episode of Raw, Bliss would then begin a feud with Eva Marie. A match between Bliss and Marie was announced at SummerSlam on August 16 episode of Raw. At the event, Bliss would defeat Marie. At Extreme Rules, Bliss failed to win the Raw Women's Championship from Charlotte Flair, and after the match, Flair would tear up Lilly. At Elimination Chamber, Bliss entered contendership Elimination Chamber match for Raw Women's Championship; eliminating Liv Morgan and then eliminated by Bianca Belair. On the May 9, 2022, episode of Raw, Bliss made her return by defeating Sonya Deville after the latter's contract as a WWE official got terminated. During a six-woman tag team match on the July 18 episode of Raw, Bliss won the 24/7 Championship for the first time by pinning Nikki A.S.H. before immediately losing the title to Doudrop.

On the October 31 episode of Raw, Bliss and Asuka defeated Damage CTRL (Dakota Kai and Iyo Sky) to win the WWE Women's Tag Team Championship. In a rematch at Crown Jewel, Bliss and Asuka lost the titles back to Kai and Sky due to an interference from Nikki Cross. At Survivor Series WarGames, the team of Bliss, Belair, Asuka, Lynch, and Mia Yim defeated the team of Damage CTRL (Kai, Sky, and Bayley), Cross, and Ripley in a WarGames match.

With the return of Bray Wyatt to WWE in late 2022, Bliss would begin to occasionally have backstage segments or in-ring moments interrupted by flickers of imagery connected to Wyatt and the related new Uncle Howdy character. On the January 2, 2023, episode of Raw, during a match against Raw Women's Champion Bianca Belair, Bliss would be distracted by crowd members wearing Uncle Howdy masks and flickers of Wyatt's imagery on the video screen. The content would cause her to snap and viciously attack both the referee and Belair, causing Bliss to lose via disqualification and Belair to retain the title. A rematch between the two for the title was later scheduled for the Royal Rumble. At the event on January 28, Bliss failed to win the title.

==== Return from hiatus and partnership with Charlotte Flair (2025–present) ====
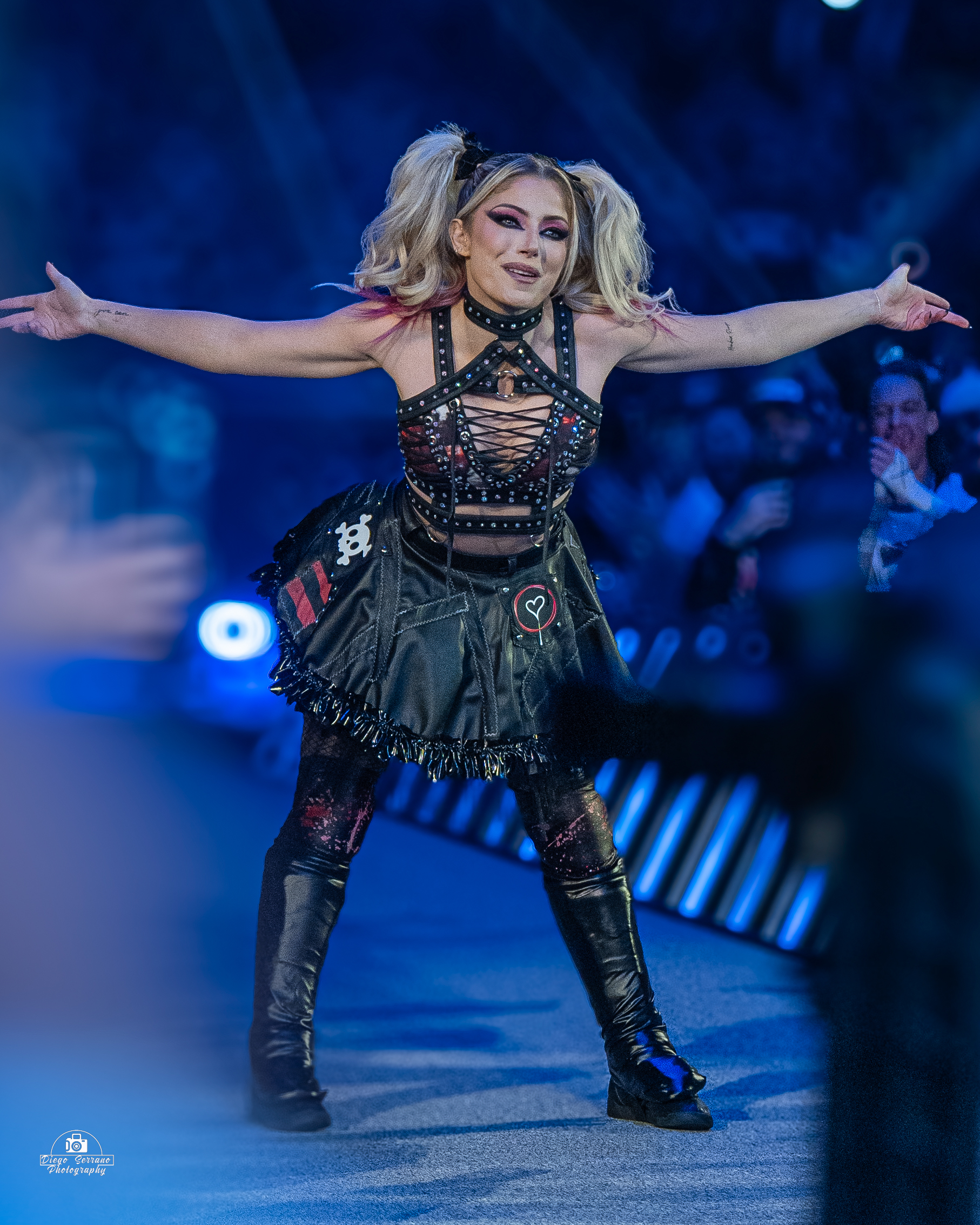
Bliss made her return at 2025 Royal Rumble following a 2-year hiatus.

At the Royal Rumble event on February 1, 2025, Bliss made her first appearance in two years, entering the Royal Rumble match before being eliminated by Liv Morgan. She participated in the Elimination Chamber match, the Money in the Bank ladder match, and the 2025 Queen of the Ring tournament, but lost all of them.

In June, Bliss began to approach Charlotte Flair to work together but was consistently rebuffed by Flair. Bliss ultimately convinced Flair and the duo agreed to be “Allies of Convenience.” On July 13 at Evolution, Bliss and Flair competed in a fatal four-way tag team match for the WWE Women's Tag Team Championship but were unsuccessful. At SummerSlam Night 1 on August 2, Bliss and Flair defeated The Judgment Day (Raquel Rodriguez and Roxanne Perez) to win the titles for the first time as a team and Bliss’ fourth time individually. Throughout their reign the duo successfully defended the titles against the likes of The Judgement Day, The Culling (Izzi Dame and Tatum Paxley), The Green Regime (Green and Alba Fyre), ZaRuca (Zaria and Sol Ruca), and Bayley and Lyra Valkyria. On the November 10 episode of Raw, Bliss and Flair lost the titles to the Kabuki Warriors, ending their reign at 100 days. At Survivor Series: WarGames, Bliss and Flair were on the winning side of the WarGames match.

Starting 2026, Bliss participated again in the Royal Rumble and the Elimination Chamber match, but didn't win neither. At Night 1 of WrestleMania 42 on April 18, Bliss and Flair unsuccessfully challenged for the WWE Women’s Tag Team Championship in a fatal four-way match. On the July 10 episode of Smackdown, Bliss suffered an arm injury after an attack by Jade Cargill. Bliss returned on the August 7 episode of Smackdown alongside new ally Tatum Paxley, who subsequently aligned herself with Bliss and Flair. At Sunday Night’s Main Event on September 6, Bliss, Flair and Paxley lost to Cargill, Michin, and B-Fab. On the October 9 episode of SmackDown, Bliss and Paxley won the WWE Women’s Tag Team Championships from Fatal Influence (Fallon Henley and Lainey Reid), Bliss' fifth reign overall, losing it two weeks later to Michin and B-Fab.

== Professional wrestling style and persona ==
Bliss began her career using a fairy gimmick, which saw her wearing a cheerleading uniform and blowing glitter during her entrance. In hindsight, she has spoken negatively about her early characterization and blamed her inexperience for creating it, noting that it was "a very unrelatable character" and "basically Tinker Bell in a wrestling ring". The glitter also would stick to her and her opponents, and would be hard to remove, resulting in it being banned by WWE. She eventually altered her gimmick to that of a cruel, calculating, unhinged, bullying villain, taking inspiration from the comic book character Harley Quinn in personality, and appearance. This gimmick led to her breakthrough into the main event scene and turned her into one of the biggest female stars in WWE. Furthermore, she is known to sport ring gear inspired by pop culture icons such as Iron Man, The Riddler, and Freddy Krueger, among others.

As her primary finisher, Bliss uses a diving barani flip from the top rope dubbed Twisted Bliss, which originates from her background in gymnastics and was initially called the Sparkle Splash. As an alternate finisher, she also employs a snap DDT known as the Twisted DDT. During her alliance with "The Fiend" Bray Wyatt, she adopted his finishing move, a swinging reverse STO called Sister Abigail.

== Other media ==
=== Video games ===
Year	Title	Ref.
2016	WWE 2K17	
2017	WWE 2K18	
2018	WWE 2K19	
2019	WWE 2K20	
2020	WWE 2K Battlegrounds	
2022	WWE 2K22	
2023	WWE 2K23	
2024	WWE 2K24	
2025	WWE 2K25	
2026	WWE 2K26	

=== Television ===
On July 24, 2017, it was announced that Bliss would be joining the seventh season of Total Divas.

In 2021, Bliss made a guest appearance on Punky Brewster as her wrestling persona alongside fellow professional wrestler Charlotte Flair.

In 2023, Bliss competed in season nine of The Masked Singer as "Axolotl". She was eliminated on "Country Night" alongside Holly Robinson Peete as "Fairy". On September 19, 2024, Bliss revealed that she provided the English dub voiceover for the character Maki Ueda in the Netflix series The Queen of Villains.

In 2025, Bliss, credited as Lexi Cabrera, made her anime voice acting debut as the English dub voice of the assassin Obiguro in the Netflix adaptation of Sakamoto Days.

=== Other ===
In early 2020, Bliss appeared in the music video for a song by Bowling for Soup, having previously cited them as her favorite band. The song, titled "Alexa Bliss", would then appear on the group's eleventh studio album, Pop Drunk Snot Bread, in 2022.

On June 23, 2020, Bliss confirmed her long rumored WWE podcast, which is titled Uncool with Alexa Bliss and debuted on September 22, 2020. On February 6, 2025, it was reported that Bliss had signed with Paradigm Talent Agency.

Bliss and her husband Ryan Cabrera released a single titled I'm Just Drunk (Lexi's texts), which also featured Jaret Reddick and Tommy Carlucci, on October 9, 2026.

== Personal life ==
Kaufman has been an avid fan of Disney since the age of three, which she attributes to her family's annual trips to Walt Disney World despite their low income at the time. She enjoys cosplaying, which has inspired many of her wrestling outfits such as Freddy Krueger, Harley Quinn, Iron Man, The Riddler, Supergirl, and Chucky. She also supports her hometown Columbus Blue Jackets. She has cited Trish Stratus and Rey Mysterio as her influences in wrestling.

Kaufman was previously engaged to fellow professional wrestler Matthew Adams, better known by the ring name Buddy Murphy, and now known by the name Buddy Matthews. They ended their engagement in 2018, but remained friends. She had a pet pig named Larry-Steve, whom she shared with Adams, until the pig's death on May 25, 2021.

In February 2020, Kaufman began dating musician Ryan Cabrera. The couple were married on April 9, 2022, in Palm Desert, California. On November 27, 2023, Bliss gave birth to a daughter.

In March 2023, Kaufman revealed that she had skin cancer in past, caused by use of tanning equipment, and had undergone medical procedures for its removal.

== Filmography ==
Television
Year	Title	Role	Notes
2015–2019	Total Divas	Herself	Guest (seasons 4, 6, 8, & 9); Main cast (season 7): 15 episodes
2017–2018	Walk the Prank	Herself	Season 2, episodes 25–26
2018	Carpool Karaoke: The Series	Herself	Season 2, episode 5
2018	Celebrity Page	Herself	Season 3, episode 147
2018	Steve	Herself	Season 1, episode 84
2020	A Little Late with Lilly Singh	Herself	Season 1, episode 79
2020	Fight Like A Girl	Herself	Season 1, episode 4
2021	Punky Brewster	Alexa Bliss	Season 1, episode 6
2021–2022	Miz & Mrs.	Herself	2 episodes
2021–2023	Entertainment Tonight	Herself	3 episodes
2023	The Masked Singer	Herself/Axolotl	Season 9, episode 6: "Country Night"
2023	Weakest Link	Herself	Season 3, episode 10
2023	That's My Jam	Herself	Season 2, episode 8
2023	Jeopardy!	Herself	Season 39, episode 140
2023	Celebrity Game Face	Herself	Season 4, episode 8
2024	The Queen of Villains	Maki Ueda	Supporting Voice Role (English Dub)
2025	Sakamoto Days	Obiguro	Supporting Voice Role (English Dub); Credited as "Lexi Cabrera"
2026	Everything on the Menu With Braun Strowman	Herself	Episode: "Pancakes and Palm Trees"

Music Videos
Year	Title	Artist	Notes
2020	"Alexa Bliss"	Bowling for Soup	

== Championships and accomplishments ==
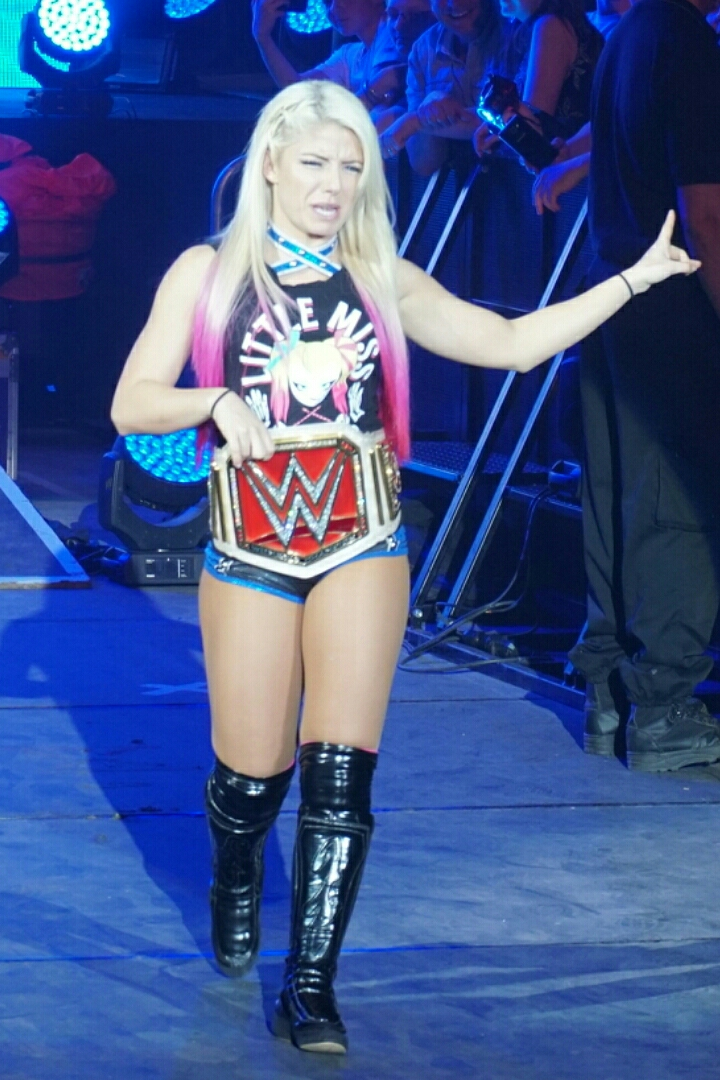
Bliss is a three-time Raw Women's Champion...

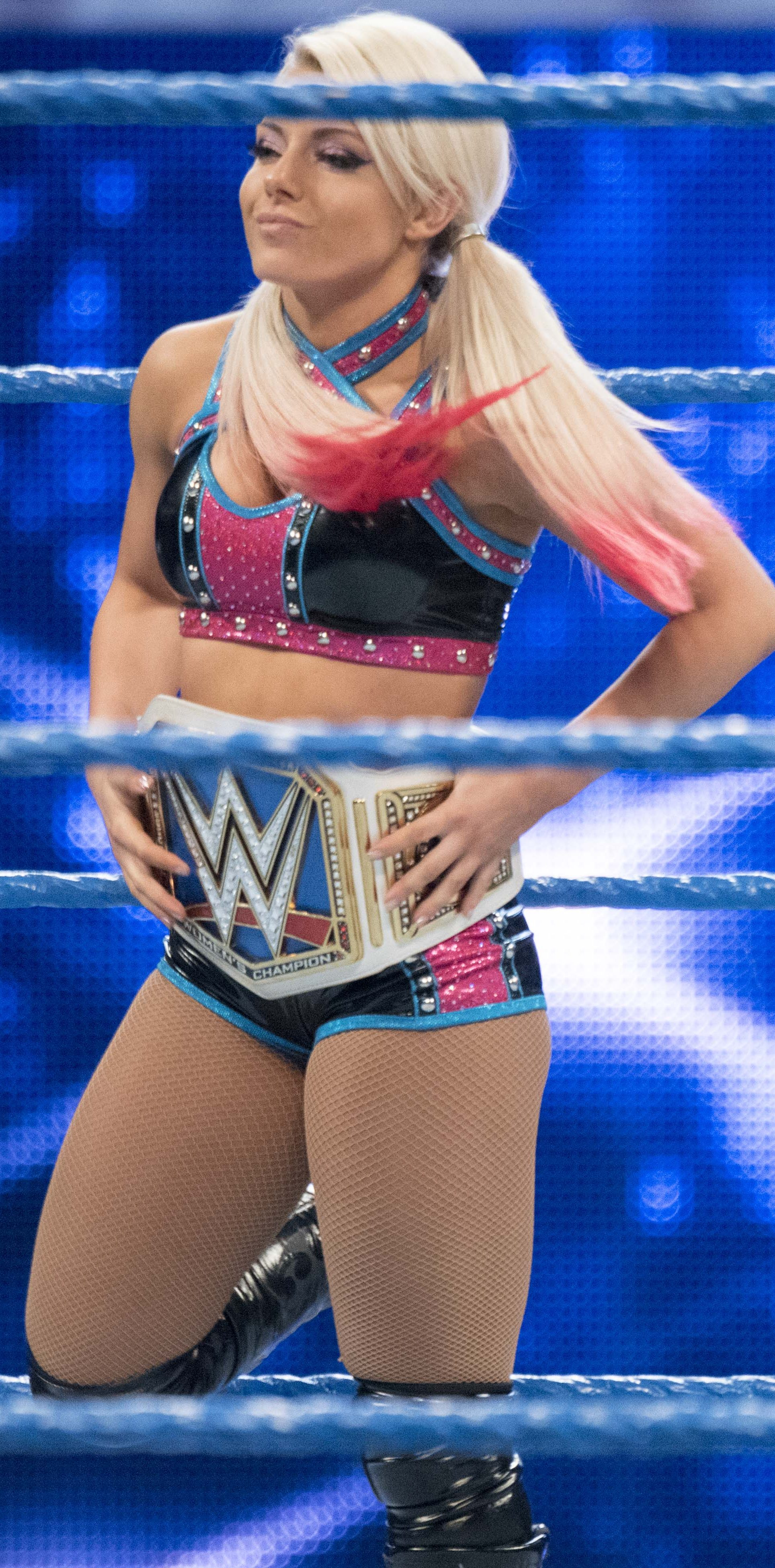
...and a two-time SmackDown Women's Champion, making her an overall five-time world champion in WWE

.

- Pro Wrestling Illustrated
  - Ranked No. 2 of the top 100 female wrestlers in the PWI Women's 100 in 2018
  - Ranked No. 22 of the top 50 tag teams in the PWI Tag Team 50 in 2020 with Nikki Cross
- Sports Illustrated
  - Ranked No. 6 in the top 10 women's wrestlers in 2018
- Wrestling Observer Newsletter
  - Worst Feud of the Year (2021) with "The Fiend" Bray Wyatt vs. Randy Orton
  - Worst Gimmick (2021)
- WWE
  - WWE Raw Women's Championship (3 times)
  - WWE SmackDown Women's Championship (2 times)
  - WWE Women's Tag Team Championship (5 times) – with Nikki Cross (2), Asuka (1), Charlotte Flair (1), and Tatum Paxley (1)
  - WWE 24/7 Championship (1 time)
  - Women's Money in the Bank (2018)
  - Second WWE Women's Triple Crown Champion

Preceded by Carmella	Mrs. Money in the Bank; 2018	Succeeded by Bayley
