= Nikki Cross =

Scottish professional wrestler (born 1989)

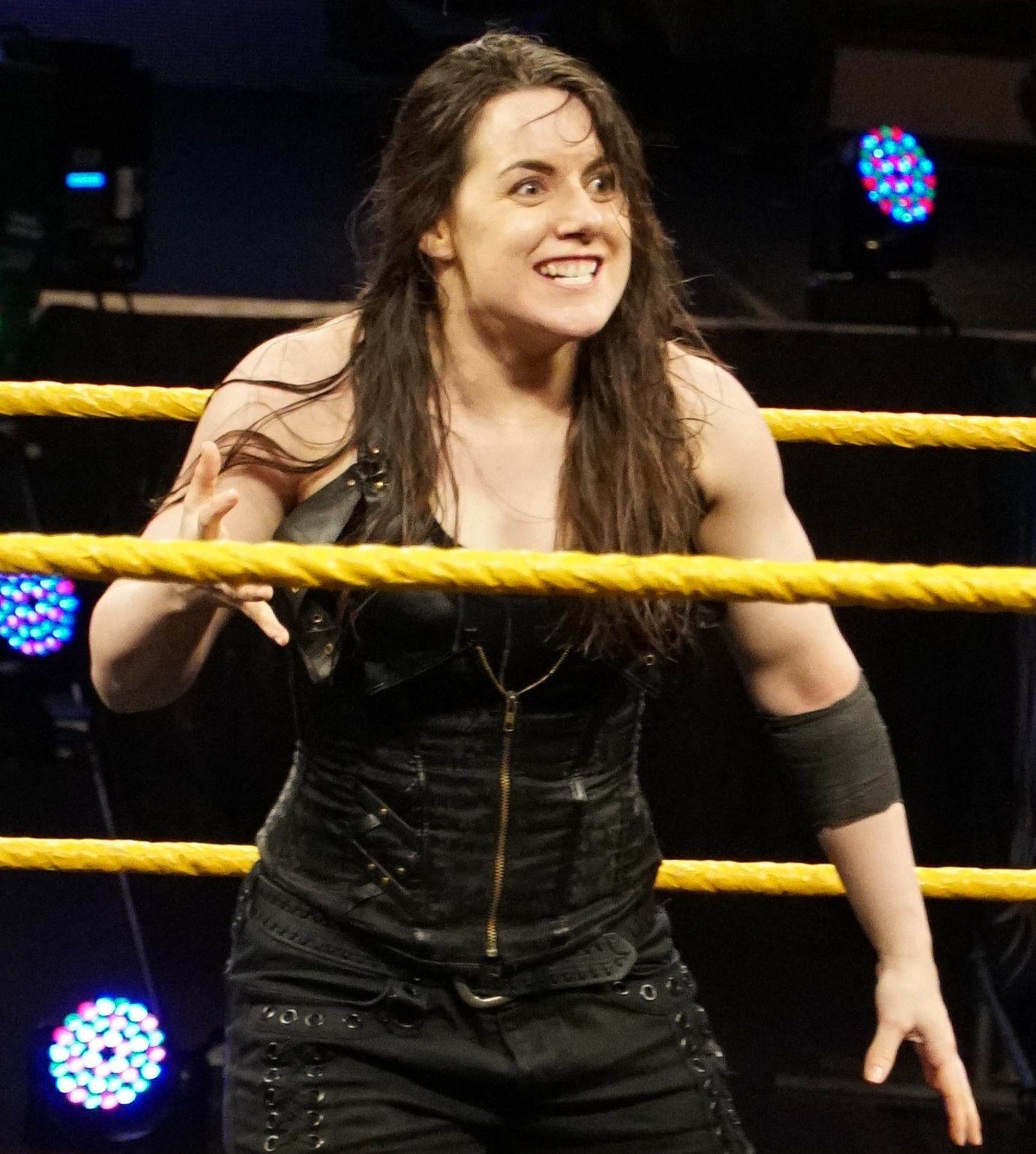
- Cross in 2018

Personal information
- Born: Nicola Glencross; 21 April 1989 (age 37) Glasgow, Scotland
- Education: University of Glasgow (BA); University of Edinburgh (MSc)
- Spouse: Killian Dain (m. 2019)

Professional wrestling career
- Ring name(s): Nicola Glencross; Nikki Storm; Nikki Cross; Nikki A.S.H.
- Billed height: 1.53 m (5 ft 0 in)
- Billed weight: 53 kg (117 lb)
- Billed from: Glasgow, Scotland
- Trained by: Killian Dain; Robbie Brookside; Finn Bálor; Johnny Kidd; Paul Tracey
- Debut: 20 September 2008

Nicola Glencross (born 21 April 1989) is a Scottish professional wrestler and promoter. She performs on the independent circuit under the ring name Nikki Storm. She is also the co-owner of the independent promotion Progress Wrestling. She is best known for her tenure in WWE, where she performed under the ring names Nikki Cross and Nikki A.S.H.

Glencross began her wrestling career on the independent circuit with the name Nikki Storm, most notably working for Insane Championship Wrestling, Pro-Wrestling: EVE, and Shimmer Women Athletes. In 2016, Glencross signed a contract with WWE, altering her ring name to Nikki Cross. In her first years with the company, she was in the NXT brand as part of the stable Sanity. Her first character gimmick was that of a psychopathic and unhinged woman who would suffer mood swings. In mid-2018, Sanity was drafted to SmackDown without Cross, who stayed in NXT.

Cross was promoted to the main roster in December 2018. In 2019, Cross was drafted to Raw and formed a tag team with Alexa Bliss, winning the WWE Women's Tag Team Championship twice. From June 21, 2021 to October 24, 2022, Glencross character became a faux-superhero known as Nikki A.S.H. (standing for "Almost a Super Hero"). As Nikki A.S.H., she won the Money in the Bank contract and successfully cashed it in the next day to become Raw Women's Champion. She also won the WWE Women's Tag Team Championship alongside Rhea Ripley. On October 24, 2022 she reverted back to the Nikki Cross name and persona. She joined the Wyatt Sicks stable in June 17, 2024 and was released from WWE in April 24, 2026.

== Early life ==
Nicola Glencross was born and raised in Glasgow, Scotland. She attended and graduated from the University of Glasgow with a Bachelor of Arts in history, and obtained her Master's degree from the University of Edinburgh, also in history; her Master's dissertation was on the subject of women's wrestling.

== Professional wrestling career ==
=== Early career (2008–2016) ===
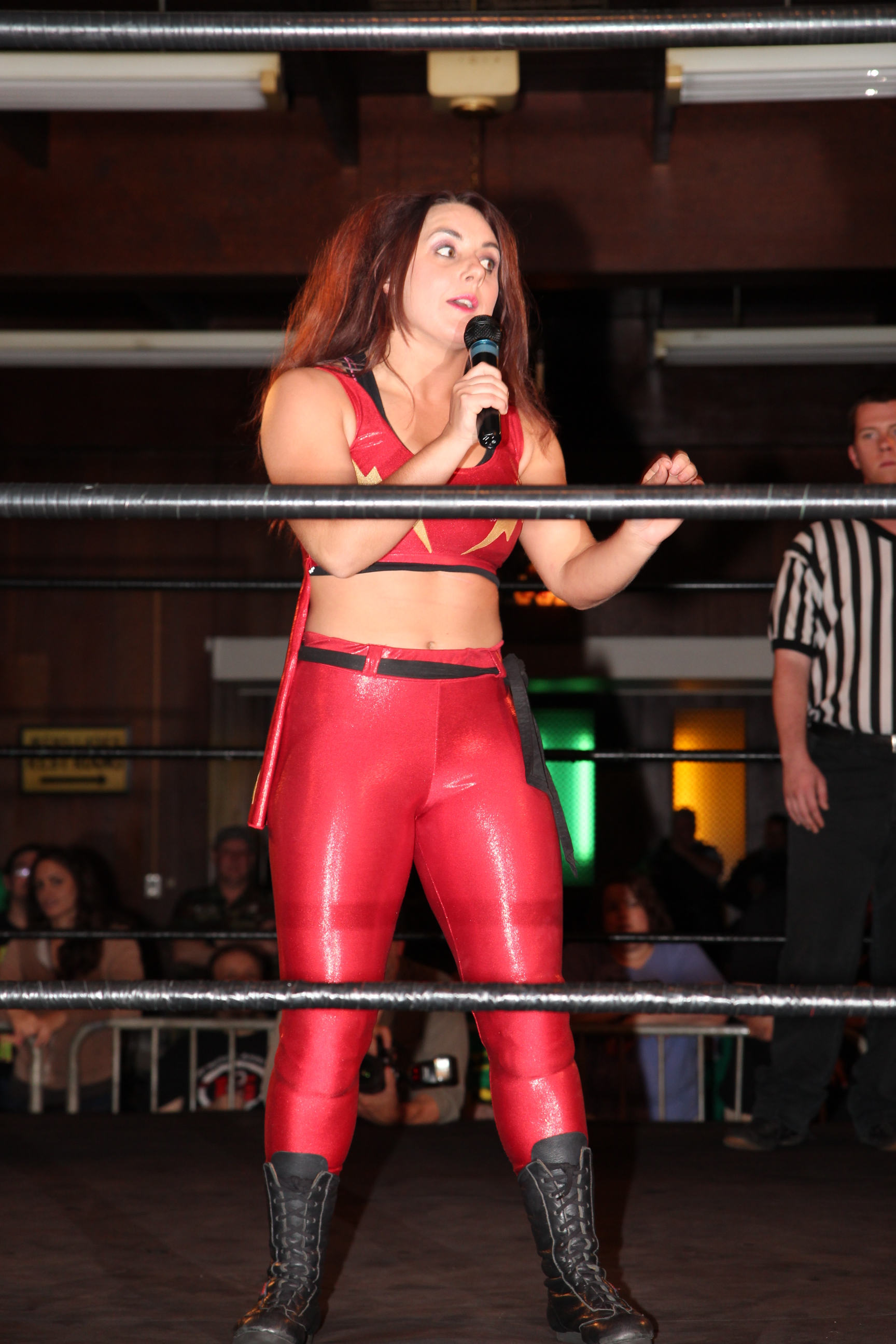
Storm appearing in Shimmer Women Athletes in 2012

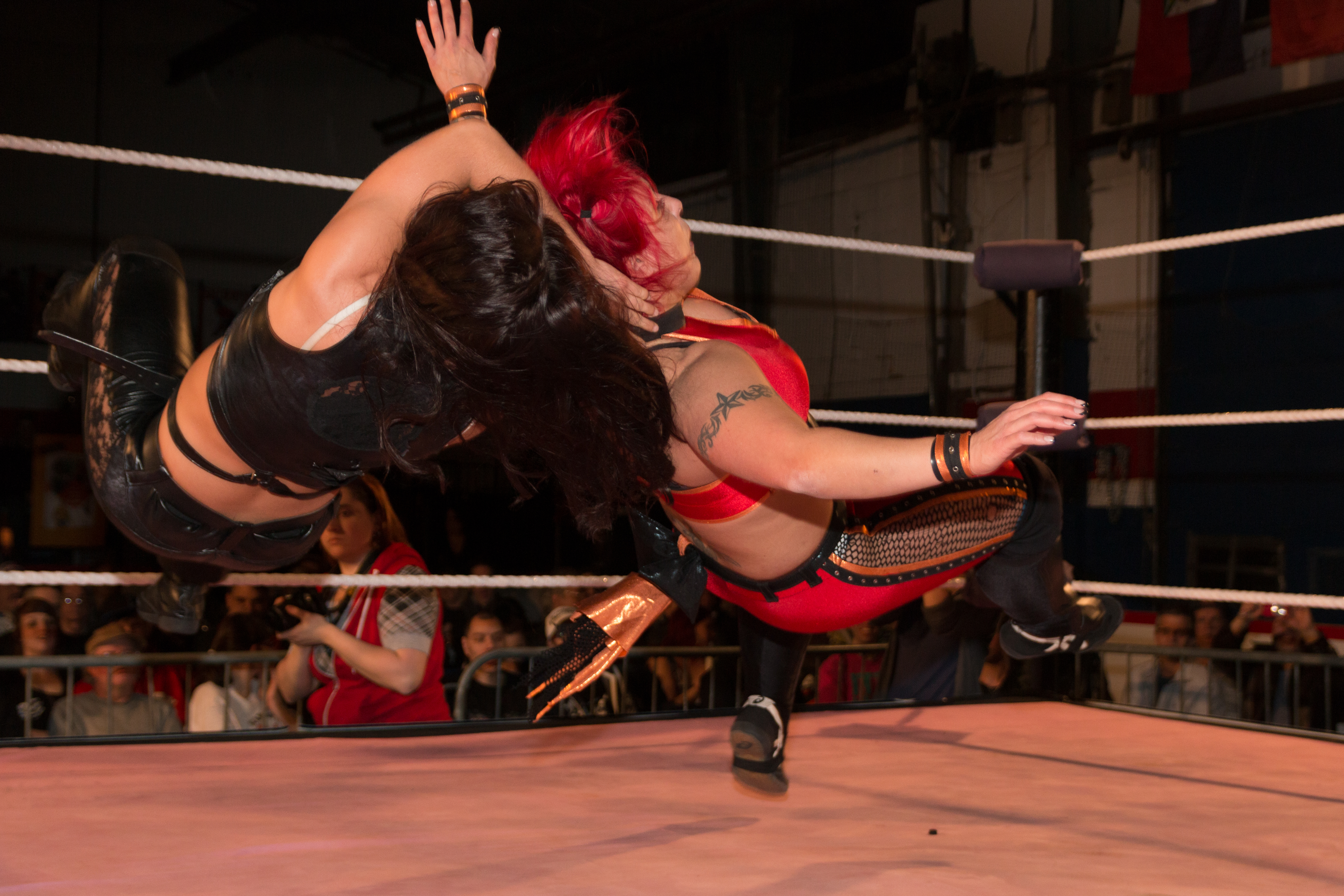
Storm (left) performing a swinging fisherman's neckbreaker on Lufisto in 2014.

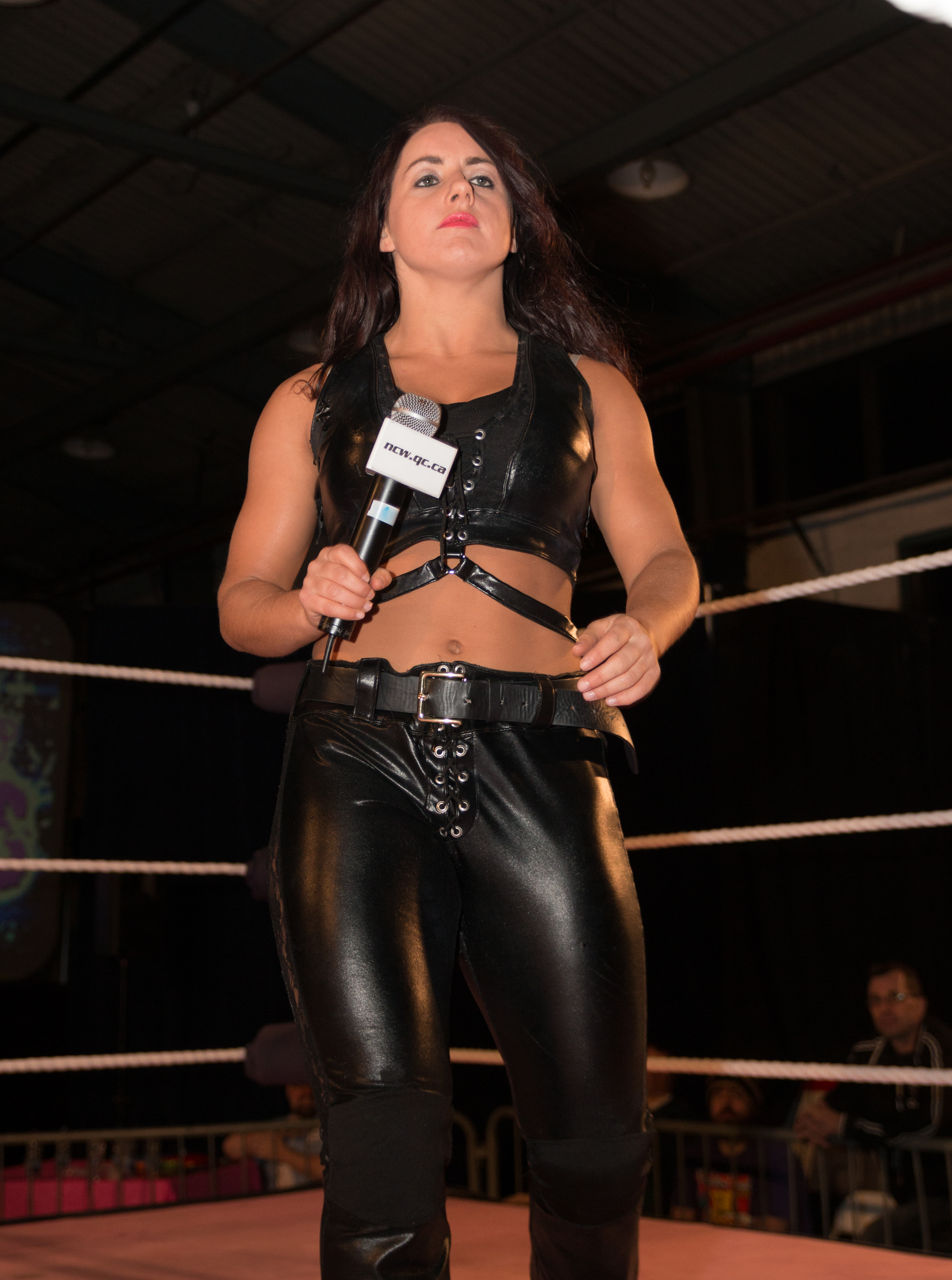
Storm pre-match at an NCW Femme Fatales show in April 2014

In September 2008, Glencross made her professional wrestling debut with the Scottish Wrestling Alliance. She initially performed under the ring name "Nikki Storm", a name given to her by then-SWA ring announcer Marty Michaels, inspired by the X Men character Storm. In February 2010, she began working on the British independent circuit, and became a mainstay for promotions such as her debuting at the Insane Championship Wrestling (ICW), and Pro-Wrestling: EVE, where she held the Pro-Wrestling: EVE Championship three times. In 2013, Storm began touring in Japan with JWP Joshi Puroresu, and made some appearances for World Wonder Ring Stardom until the middle of the summer of 2015.

In October 2013, Storm began wrestling for American all-female promotions Shimmer Women Athletes, Shine Wrestling and Women Superstars Uncensored. She has also wrestled for Global Force Wrestling (GFW), Absolute Intense Wrestling (AIW), World Wide Wrestling League (W3L), Queens of Combat, and World Xtreme Wrestling.

Glencross competed in Total Nonstop Action Wrestling (TNA)'s British Boot Camp 2, which began airing in October 2014, in which she was unsuccessful. During the show, she had a four-way match against Kasey Owens, Kay Lee Ray and Leah Owens, which she was victorious.

=== WWE (2016–2026) ===
==== Sanity (2016–2018) ====
Glencross received a tryout with WWE in London during the autumn of 2015, after catching the attention of William Regal earlier during an appearance as one of Adam Rose's Rosebuds. On April 12, 2016, she was one of ten signees that had begun training at the WWE Performance Center in Orlando, Florida. She debuted for NXT on 22 April during a live event. During a Facebook live video in August, she was introduced as Nikki Cross. She made her first televised appearance and in-ring debut on 17 August episode of NXT under the name Nikki Glencross, where she competed in a six-woman tag team match along with Carmella and Liv Morgan, defeating Daria Berenato, Mandy Rose, and Alexa Bliss. On 12 October episode of NXT, Nikki Cross returned as part of the debuting heel stable, Sanity, along with Alexander Wolfe, Eric Young, and Sawyer Fulton (who was later replaced by Killian Dain). Nikki Cross and Young accompanied Fulton and Wolfe for their winning effort against Bobby Roode and Tye Dillinger in the first round of the Dusty Rhodes Tag Team Classic. One week later, Nikki Cross scored her first televised singles victory over Danielle Kamela, however, the decision was reversed because Nikki Cross continued to attack Kamela after the match. On 11 January 2017 episode of NXT, Nikki Cross came to the aid of NXT Women's Champion Asuka, who was being attacked by The Iconic Duo (Billie Kay and Peyton Royce), before turning on Asuka and attacking her as well. As a result, Cross, Royce, and Kay were placed in a four-way match at the TakeOver: San Antonio event on 28 January, which Cross failed to win. In May, Cross participated in a number one contender's battle royal for Asuka's NXT Women's Championship, where she, Ruby Riot, and Ember Moon were attacked by Asuka for being the last competitors left in the match and as a result, all four of them were placed into a four-way championship match at TakeOver: Chicago, which was later changed to a three-way match after Ember Moon suffered an injury. At the event, Cross failed to capture the title. In a rematch which was contested in a three-way elimination match once again against both women, Riot was the first eliminated before the match ended in a no contest as Cross and Asuka brawled backstage. This led to a last woman standing match (the first-ever in WWE history) between the two women for the NXT Women's Championship on 28 June episode of NXT, in which Cross was once again defeated.

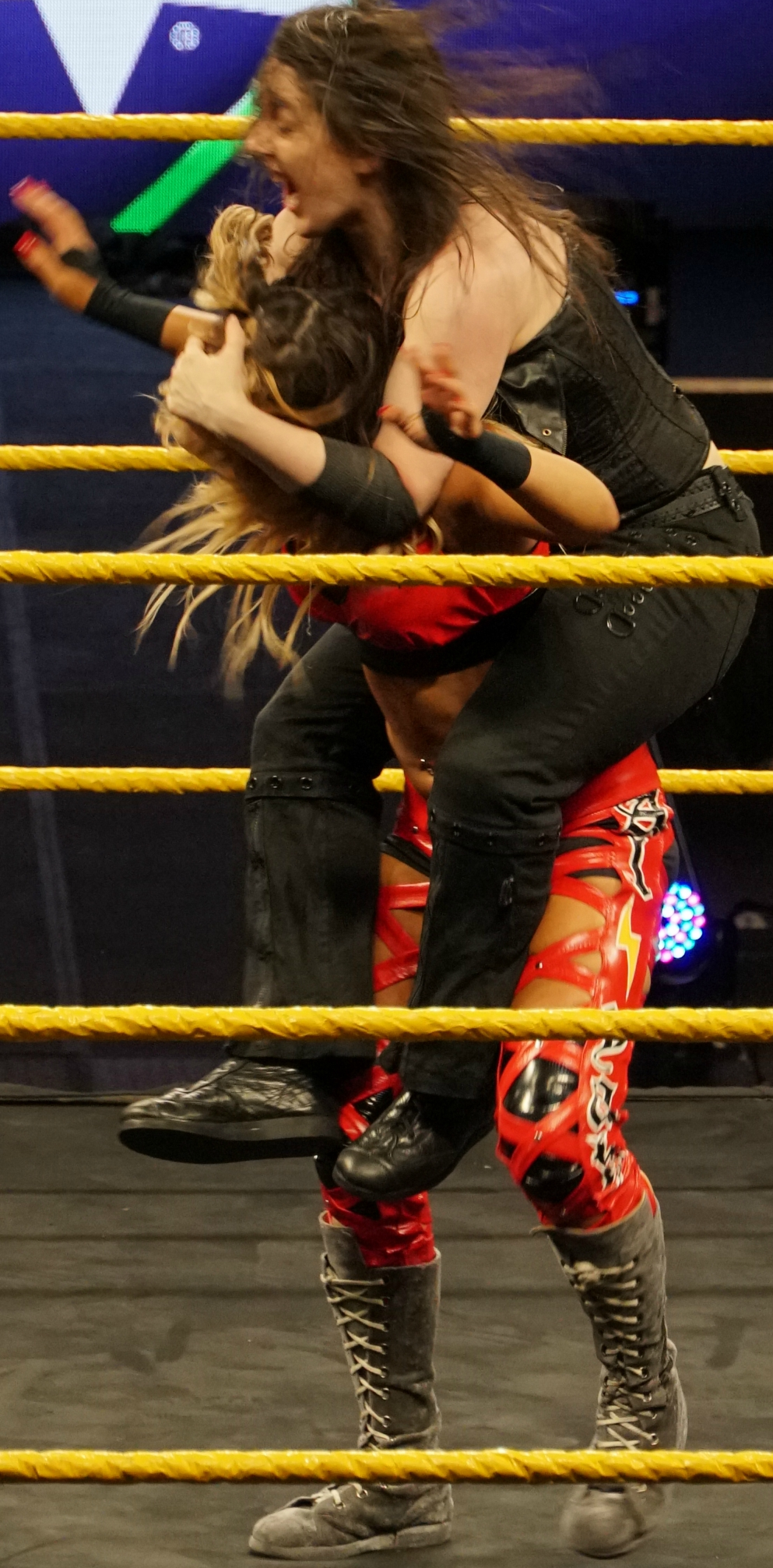
Cross (right) applying a standing sleeper hold on Aliyah in 2018.

On 19 August at TakeOver: Brooklyn III, Cross accompanied and helped Sanity to capture the NXT Tag Team Championship from The Authors of Pain. On 20 September episode of NXT, Sanity helped Drew McIntyre against The Undisputed Era, thus turning them face in the process. In October, Cross earned herself a spot for the fatal four-way match for the vacant NXT Women's Championship at TakeOver: WarGames on 18 November, which was ultimately won by Ember Moon. During the 2018 Superstar Shake-up, her fellow stable partners Eric Young, Alexander Wolfe, and Killian Dain were drafted to SmackDown, leaving Cross on NXT to work again as a singles competitor.

In 2018, Cross began a short winning streak, defeating Lacey Evans and Vanessa Borne. Throughout the summer, Cross started a feud with Shayna Baszler over the NXT Women's Championship, which led to a match between the two at TakeOver: Chicago II, in which Cross was once again unsuccessful and was defeated by technical submission. After a short hiatus, Cross returned in August and she was placed in the Aleister Black attack storyline where she was revealed to be a witness as she was on the roof of the building at the time he was attacked. In September, Cross also started a short feud with Bianca Belair which led to a match between the two that ended in a double count-out. One month later on 17 October episode of NXT, a rematch ended in a no contest after Aleister Black returned and interrupted it to ask Cross who his attacker was. Johnny Gargano was eventually revealed as the attacker and her involvement in the storyline sparked a match between Cross and Gargano's wife Candice LeRae, whom she was able to defeat in a singles match at TakeOver: WarGames.

==== Teaming with Alexa Bliss (2018–2020) ====
On 6 November 2018 episode of SmackDown from Manchester, England, Cross made her surprise main roster debut on SmackDown by answering an open challenge from WWE SmackDown Women's Champion Becky Lynch, who defeated her in a non-title match. On 17 December 2018 episode of Raw, Cross was advertised as one of the six NXT wrestlers about to be moved up to the main roster. Cross wrestled her final NXT match on 9 January 2019 episode of NXT, where she lost to Bianca Belair, officially ending the feud between the two as well. On 14 January 2019 episode of Raw, Cross made her Raw debut, teaming with Bayley and Natalya in a winning effort against The Riott Squad (Liv Morgan, Ruby Riott, and Sarah Logan). At the Royal Rumble, Cross entered her first Royal Rumble match at number 8, lasting nine minutes before being eliminated by The IIconics (Billie Kay and Peyton Royce). On 4 February episode of Raw, Cross and Alicia Fox were defeated by The Boss 'n' Hug Connection (Bayley and Sasha Banks) in a match to determine the final Raw entrants in the tag team Elimination Chamber match to determine the inaugural WWE Women's Tag Team Champions at the Elimination Chamber event. On 8 April (aired 24 April) at Worlds Collide, she took part in a triple threat match for the NXT UK Women's Championship, which was won by defending champion Toni Storm.

After not being mentioned during the 2019 WWE Superstar Shake-up, Cross was confirmed to have been drafted to the Raw brand on 8 May taping of Main Event (aired on 11 May). She began to work with Alexa Bliss and, during the following weeks, they would have matches for the WWE Women's Tag Team Championship and the SmackDown Women's Championship. On 5 August 2019 episode of Raw, Bliss and Cross captured the WWE Women's Tag Team Championship, marking Nikki Cross's first championship in WWE. They would defend the title at SummerSlam and at Clash of Champions but lost it at Hell in a Cell to The Kabuki Warriors (Asuka and Kairi Sane). Although drafted separately instead of as a team during the 2019 WWE Draft, they remained on Raw, but the team was then traded to SmackDown. At WrestleMania 36, Cross and Bliss won the WWE Women's Tag Team Championship for a second time by defeating The Kabuki Warriors, but they lost it on 5 June 2020 episode of SmackDown to Bayley and Sasha Banks.

On 26 June episode of SmackDown, Cross won a fatal four-way match to earn a SmackDown Women's Championship match against Bayley at The Horror Show at Extreme Rules, where Cross lost the match. On 24 July episode of SmackDown, Cross demanded a rematch for the SmackDown Women's Championship, but Bayley stated that Cross must defeat a worthy adversary in Bliss, setting up a match between Bliss and Cross where the winner would face Bayley for the title on the following week's SmackDown; Cross defeated Bliss to earn a rematch. On 31 July episode of SmackDown, Cross shoved Bliss onto the floor after losing a SmackDown Women's Championship match against Bayley, and Bliss was attacked by "The Fiend" Bray Wyatt. Bliss then aligned herself with The Fiend, and Cross tried to maintain her friendship with her, but Bliss refused and attacked Cross. As part of the 2020 WWE Draft, Cross was drafted to the Raw brand.

==== "Almost a Super Hero" and return as Nikki Cross (2021–2023) ====
On 21 June 2021 episode of Raw, Nikki Cross debuted an inspired faux-superhero gimmick with her ring name changing to Nikki A.S.H., with A.S.H. standing for "Almost a Super Hero". At Money in the Bank, she won the women's Money in the Bank ladder match and cashed in her Money in the Bank contract the following night on Raw, defeating Charlotte Flair to win the Raw Women's Championship for the first time in her career. However, she lost the title back to Flair at SummerSlam. On 20 September episode of Raw, she would win the WWE Women's Tag Team Championship for a third time with Rhea Ripley by defeating Natalya and Tamina. They lost it on 22 November episode of Raw to Queen Zelina and Carmella, ending their reign at 63 days. On 10 January 2022 episode of Raw, she turned heel by attacking Ripley. She participated in the Royal Rumble match at the namesake event and entered at #22, eliminating Mighty Molly (who also had a super heroine gimmick) before she was eliminated by eventual winner Ronda Rousey. At Elimination Chamber, she entered the Elimination Chamber match for a Raw Women's Championship match at WrestleMania 38, but was eliminated by Ripley. On 2 May episode of Raw, she would win the WWE 24/7 Championship from Dana Brooke, only to lose it to Brooke on the same episode.

In May 2022, she began to work with Doudrop as a tag team. After the Women's Tag Team Championship was vacated in May, A.S.H. and Doudrop entered a tournament to crown new champions which began in August. They lost in the first round to Alexa Bliss and Asuka. On 30 August episode of NXT 2.0, A.S.H. and Doudrop made a surprise appearance as they challenged the NXT Women's Tag Team Champions Katana Chance and Kayden Carter for their titles at Worlds Collide, but lost the match.

On 24 October 2022 episode of Raw, she interfered in a match between Bayley and Bianca Belair, attacking both women, and reverting to her "unhinged" gimmick and her "Nikki Cross" name. On 7 November episode of Raw, Cross joined Damage CTRL (Bayley, Dakota Kai, and Iyo Sky) in a brawl against Bianca Belair, Asuka, and Alexa Bliss. It was announced later that Cross would team with Damage CTRL to take on Belair, Asuka, and Bliss in a WarGames match at Survivor Series WarGames on 26 November 2022. Later in the night, Cross defeated Dana Brooke to win her 11th 24/7 Championship, but later discarded the title belt backstage; the title was deactivated shortly thereafter. Cross then started a storyline where she stalked Candice LeRae. Cross partnered Natalya against Chelsea Green & Piper Niven on 23 October 2023 episode of Raw, but just stood by the ring, making no effort to take part in the match before walking off. Cross spent the next few months in a similar state, making no attempt to fight when involved in matches and mainly being seen wandering backstage areas.

==== The Wyatt Sicks (2024–2026) ====
Cross reintroduced herself as part of the debuting Wyatt Sicks stable on 17 June 2024 episode of Raw, appearing visually to represent Abby the Witch from Bray Wyatt's "Firefly Funhouse", a persona formerly a part of Wyatt's history and lore. On 9 September episode of Raw, Cross and the rest of the Wyatt Sicks defeated American Made in a Street Fight. The stable was then drafted to the SmackDown brand, but it did not appear on television due to an injury to leader Bo Dallas, also known as "Uncle Howdy". The stable returned to television on 23 May 2025 episode of SmackDown, attacking Street Profits, Fraxiom and DIY.

On 24 April 2026, Cross announced her departure from WWE, ending her ten-year tenure with the promotion.

=== Independent circuit (2026–present) ===
On 26 May 2026, it was announced that Glencross and her husband Big Damo (formerly Killian Dain in WWE) had purchased Progress Wrestling and DEFY Wrestling. On 23 July, Glencross had her first match since 2024 under her previous ring name Nikki Storm, where she teamed with her husband during an Over the Top Wrestling (OTT) event where they defeated The Weirdos (Frankie Vendetta and Kat Von Kay). Three months later, Storm and Damo sold DEFY back to the original founders. Storm became OTT Women's Champion in October 2026 in Belfast, Northern Ireland

=== Maple Leaf Pro Wrestling (2026–present) ===
Storm made her Maple Leaf Pro Wrestling (MLP) debut during the 26 August 2026 episode of Mayhem where she defeated Dani Luna, Gisele Shaw, and Priscilla Kelly to earn a match at the Northern Rising event against an opponent of her choosing. on September 16 at Mayhem after Priscilla Kelly defeated Gisele Shaw for the MLP Canadian Women's Championship, Storm turning heel on first.

== Personal life ==
On January 17, 2019, Glencross married her long-time boyfriend, Northern Irish professional wrestler Damian Mackle, who performed as Killian Dain in WWE alongside Glencross as part of the stable Sanity. In 2023, she graduated from the University of Edinburgh with a master's degree in history.

== Other media ==
Nikki Cross made her video game debut in WWE 2K18 and has appeared in WWE 2K20, WWE 2K Battlegrounds, WWE 2K22, WWE 2K23, WWE 2K24, WWE 2K25 and WWE 2K26.

== Championships and accomplishments ==
- Over The Top Wrestling
  - OTT Women's Championship (1 time)
- Pro-Wrestling: EVE
  - Pro-Wrestling: EVE Championship (3 times)
  - Queen of the Ring (2012)
- Pro Wrestling Illustrated
  - Ranked No. 18 of the top 100 female singles wrestlers in the PWI Women's 100 in 2019
  - Ranked No. 22 of the top 50 tag teams in the PWI Tag Team 50 in 2020 – with Alexa Bliss
- Scottish Wrestling Network
  - OSWtv/SWN Award (2 times)
    - Female Wrestler of the Year (2015)
    - Outstanding Recognition Award for Extraordinary Service (2021)
  - Hall of Fame (2021)
  - W3L Women's Championship (1 time)
- WWE
  - WWE Raw Women's Championship (1 time)
  - WWE Women's Tag Team Championship (3 times) – with Alexa Bliss (2) and Rhea Ripley (1)
  - WWE 24/7 Championship (11 times, final)
  - Women's Money in the Bank (2021)
  - Slammy Award (1 time)
    - WTF Moment of the Year (2025) Wyatt Sicks debut on RAW with Bo Dallas, Erick Rowan, Dexter Lumis and Joe Gacy
