= Piper Niven =

Scottish professional wrestler (born 1991)

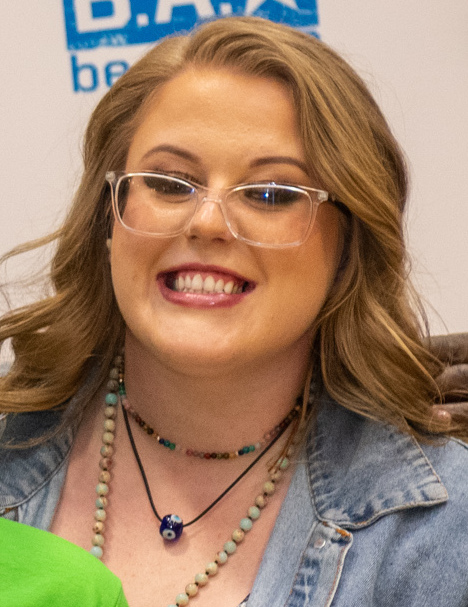
- Niven in 2023

Personal information
- Born: Kimberly Benson; 6 May 1991 (age 35) Kilbirnie, Ayrshire, Scotland

Professional wrestling career
- Ring name(s): Doudrop; Piper Niven; Viper
- Billed from: Ayrshire, Scotland
- Trained by: Damian O'Connor
- Debut: 2007

Kimberly Benson (born 6 May 1991) is a Scottish professional wrestler. She is signed to WWE, where she performs on the SmackDown brand under the ring name Piper Niven.

Benson began her career on the UK independent circuit under the ring name Viper, also performing in the American independent promotion Shimmer Women Athletes and in Japan for World Wonder Ring Stardom. After participating in the 2017 Mae Young Classic, she was signed to a contract by WWE in 2019. She is a former one-time Artist of Stardom Champion, two-time ICW Women's Champion, one-time SWA World Champion, two-time WWE 24/7 Champion, and one-time WWE Women's Tag Team Champion.

== Early life ==
Kimberly Benson was born on 6 May 1991, in Kilbirnie, Scotland. She first discovered the sport at age nine when she happened upon a wrestling program on television. "I went past something that was, for a split second, flashing lights and music," she shared in an interview with BBC Scotland.

Growing up, she kept her love for professional wrestling a secret due to being worried that her female friends would think she was weird as they believed that it was only a sport for men. It wasn't until Benson was fifteen, and when her oldest nephew began to watch wrestling, that her passion was rekindled and she was open about enjoying wrestling.

== Professional wrestling career ==
=== Independent circuit (2007–2019) ===
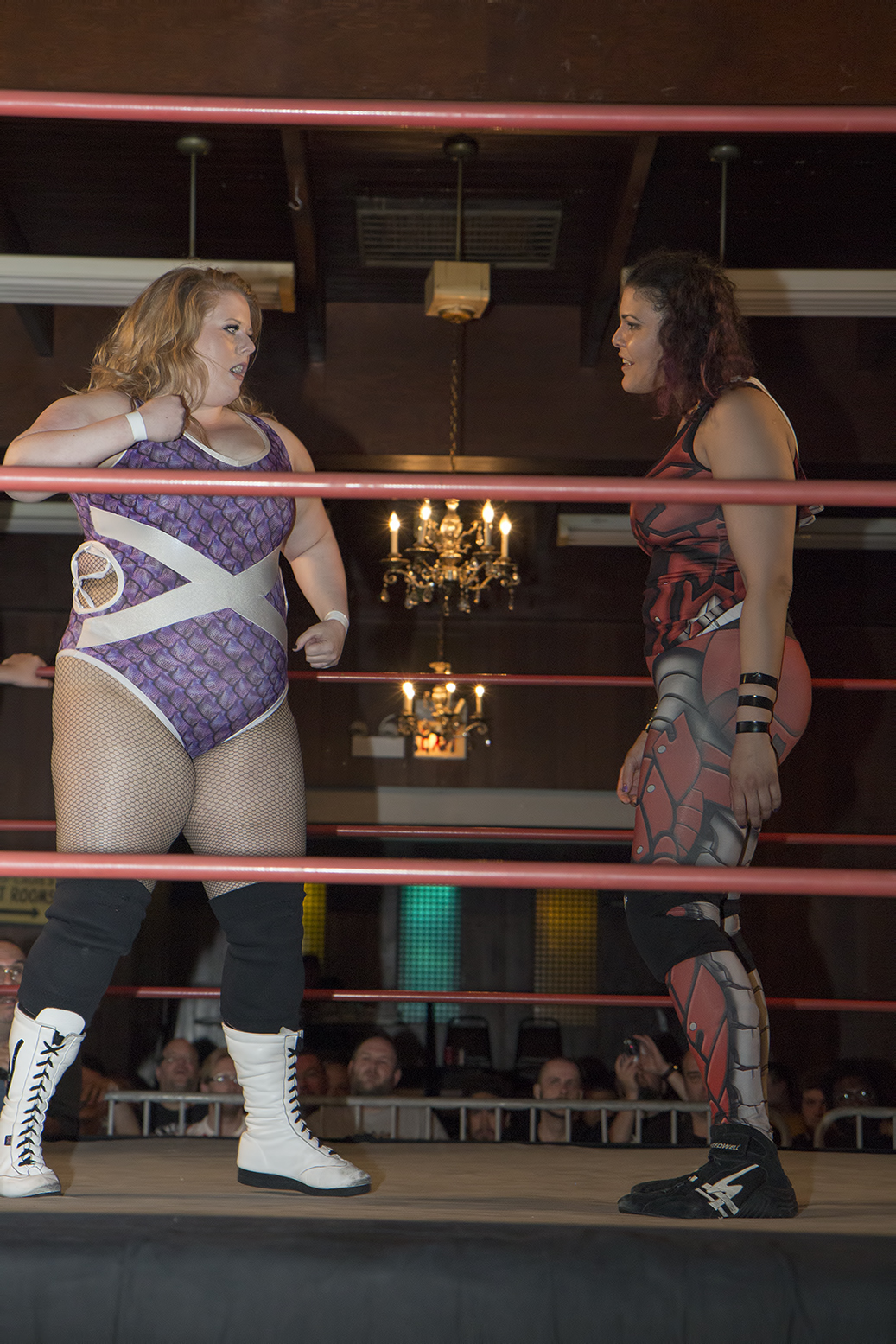
Viper faces off with Vanessa Kraven during a SHIMMER show in 2016

Benson began training in professional wrestling at age fifteen, and according to her, she debuted one year after beginning her training. About her training, she said: "I got beat up, totally beat up. I remember lying in bed the next day, being so sore and in absolute agony, but I just loved it, I had to go back."

She was part of the special program of ITV World of Sport Wrestling celebrated on New Year's Eve 2016, and until April of that year, she was programmed to appear on a revival of the series. However, a month later before filming was set to begin, the project was postponed indefinitely. Benson's last match in independent circuit was at Scottish Wrestling Alliance Lion's Den in November 2019.

=== Insane Championship Wrestling (2013–2019) ===
Benson made her debut for Insane Championship Wrestling at Tramspotting on 17 February 2013 under the ring name Viper. She became the inaugural ICW Women's Champion at Fear & Loathing VIII in a tournament final victory over Kay Lee Ray and Nikki Storm in November 2015. She regained the title in 2018 on an episode of ICW Fight Club before losing the title after 283 days to Kay Lee Ray in the inaugural Queen of Insanity match. She competed against ICW's men roster for a shot at the ICW World Heavyweight Championship in the 2019 Square Go! match which included the likes of Jeff Jarrett, Wolfgang, Andy Wild, Leyton Buzzard, Kez Evans, BT Gunn, Grado, Jackie Polo, Mark Coffey, Joe Hendry, Kenny Williams and others.

=== World Wonder Ring Stardom (2016–2019) ===
In 2017, Benson worked in Japan as Viper for the company World Wonder Ring Stardom. On 7 January of that year, at the event Stardom New Years Stars 2017 – Tag 2, she was part of the team "Oedo Tai" with Kagetsu and Kyoko Kimura as a replacement for Hana Kimura who was injured, where she tried to help the team to retain the Artist of Stardom Championship against "Queen's Quest" a team integrated by HZK, Io Shirai and Momo Watanabe, in which they were defeated and they lost the title. On 13 August, she joined Queen's Quest along with Shirai and HZK to face the team "Team Jungle" integrated by Hiroyo Matsumoto, Jungle Kyona and Kaori Yoneyama in a match for the Artist of Stardom Championship at the event Midsummer Champions 2017, in which they achieved to win the title and Viper crown herself champion. On 16 September, Viper participated at the event 5★Star Grand Prix 2017 of Stardom, where she draw with Mayu Iwatani both with 10 points. Along with Queen's Quest, managed to defend and retain the Artistic Championship three times before they left it vacant on 15 April 2018 after a draft executed by Stardom, ending their reign with 245. One month before that same year, on 28 March, she faced Toni Storm at the Stardom Dream Slam in Tokyo event in a match for her SWA World Championship, in which the ICW Women's Championship of Viper was also in the line, where she defeated Storm to capture the title, emerging victorious with both championships. Defended and retained the championship twice before losing it in a match against Utami Hayashishita at the Stardom 8th Anniversary event held on 14 January 2019, in which she also put her EVE International Championship at stake, where she was defeated and lost both titles, ending her reign with the SWA Championship in 292 days and with the EVE Championship in 92 days.

=== WWE (2017, 2019–present) ===
==== Mae Young Classic (2017) ====
In 2017, WWE contacted Benson, asking her to participate in the women's tournament, Mae Young Classic. The event took place in 2017 and was an all-women tournament. Benson asked World of Sport Wrestling to release her from her contract to participate in the competition. She competed as "Piper Niven" because the ring name she had been competing under, Viper, had already become the nickname of fellow WWE superstar Randy Orton, and because she had played the bagpipes as a child, in addition to Niven being her father's first name. She defeated Santana Garrett in the first round and Serena Deeb in the second round, before being defeated by Toni Storm in the quarterfinals.

==== NXT UK (2019–2021) ====
In early 2019, a rumour started spreading in which it was said and expected that Benson signed with WWE, which came out to be true when she appeared and debuted on 27 March episode of NXT UK that year, where, under the ring name Piper Niven, she confronted Rhea Ripley. Niven had her first televised match with WWE after being signed on a special program entitled WWE Worlds Collide on 24 April, which consisted on various matches that involved wrestlers from all the brands; Raw, SmackDown, NXT, 205 Live and NXT UK, this last one was the brand that she belonged to and represented, defeating Zelina Vega of SmackDown. On 19 June episode of NXT UK, Niven competed in a battle royal to determine who would have a future opportunity to face the NXT UK Women's Champion Toni Storm. In the match, Niven was eliminated by Xia Brookside.

On 12 January 2020 at the NXT UK TakeOver: Blackpool II event, Niven competed in a triple threat match against Storm and Kay Lee Ray for the NXT UK Women's Championship, where Niven was defeated and pinned by Kay Lee. Niven returned to NXT UK television on 24 September of that year, where she challenged Kay Lee Ray in a match for the NXT UK Women's Championship, where she was defeated. On 19 November, Niven challenged Ray in a Falls Count Anywhere match for the NXT UK Women's Championship, where she lost due to an interference made by Jinny.

Niven lost to Jinny in a No. 1 contenders match for the NXT UK Women's Championship on episode 7 January 2021 of NXT UK. On 11 March, in what would be Niven's final appearance for NXT UK, she teamed up with Jack Starz against Jinny and Joseph Conners in the brand's first-ever mixed tag team match, where Niven and Starz would emerge victorious.

==== Doudrop (2021–2022) ====
On 14 June 2021 episode of Raw, Niven was traded to the Raw brand as Eva Marie's unnamed protégé, defeating Naomi in her debut match. However, Marie would declare herself the winner despite not taking part in the match. The following week on Raw, Marie introduced her as Doudrop. Later that night, she and Marie were defeated in a tag team match by Asuka and Naomi. At SummerSlam, Doudrop turned against Marie, and on the following episode of Raw, Marie attacked Doudrop during an interview; starting a feud between them.

Doudrop made her WWE Main Event debut in September. After defeating Marie twice on 13 and 20 September episodes of Raw, on the next episode, Doudrop challenged Charlotte Flair for the Raw Women's Championship in a losing effort due to a distraction by Marie. In a January 2022 media profile published around the match, Sports Illustrated writer Justin Barrasso described Doudrop as "one of wrestling's most underrated performers," targeting her command of British technical wrestling, Japanese strong style, and lucha libre developed over her career on the independent circuit and in Stardom.

In October, Doudrop entered the Queen's Crown tournament, where she defeated Natalya in the first round and Shayna Baszler in the semi-finals, but lost to Zelina Vega in the finals at Crown Jewel.

In 2022, after winning a triple threat No. 1 contendership match against Bianca Belair and Liv Morgan on an episode of Raw, Doudrop challenged Raw Women's Champion Becky Lynch for the title at Royal Rumble in a losing effort. At Elimination Chamber, she entered the Elimination Chamber match for a Raw Women's Championship match at WrestleMania 38, but was eliminated by Liv Morgan. Since June, she would chase the WWE 24/7 Championship, winning the title twice.

On 2 May episode of Raw, Doudrop approached Nikki A.S.H. backstage, suggesting to align together, which A.S.H. accepted. The following week on Raw, Doudrop alongside A. S. H. challenged the WWE Women's Tag Team Champions Naomi and Sasha Banks in a non-title match, but they were unsuccessful. After the Women's Tag Team Championship was vacated on May, A.S.H. and Doudrop entered a tournament to crown a new champions which began in August. They lost in the first round to Alexa Bliss and Asuka. On 26 August episode of SmackDown, A. S. H. and Doudrop entered a second chance four-way match to return to the tournament among other three teams, which was won by Natalya and Sonya Deville. On 30 August episode of NXT, A. S. H. and Doudrop made a surprise appearance as they challenged the NXT Women's Tag Team Champions Katana Chance and Kayden Carter for their titles at Worlds Collide. At the event, they failed to win the titles due to interference from Toxic Attraction (Gigi Dolin and Jacy Jayne). After a tag team match against Toxic Attraction on 6 September episode of NXT, Doudrop went on a hiatus due to illness.

==== The Green Regime (2023–2025) ====
On 28 January 2023, Doudrop returned as Piper Niven and participated at the Royal Rumble event in the namesake match as the 18th entrant. She lasted over 28 minutes and eliminated two wrestlers before being eliminated by Raquel Rodriguez. On 14 August episode of Raw, Niven returned to the show and declared herself as Chelsea Green's new tag partner to claim the other half of the WWE Women's Tag Team Championship after Green's former partner, Sonya Deville, relinquished her half of the title due to an ACL injury. WWE recognizes Niven's reign as a continuation of Deville's. On October 31, they successfully defended their titles against Chase University (Thea Hail and Jacy Jayne) at Night 2 of NXT: Halloween Havoc. On the November 27 episode of Raw, Niven and Green had another successful title defense against number one contenders Natalya and Tegan Nox. On December 11, it was announced that Niven and Green would defend their tag team titles against the new number one contenders Kayden Carter and Katana Chance. The following week on Raw, Niven and Green would lose the tag team titles to Carter and Chance, ending their reign at 126 days. On the January 8, 2024 episode of Raw, Niven and Green were unsuccessful in an attempt to regain the titles in a championship rematch.

At Night 2 of the 2024 WWE Draft, Niven and Green were drafted to the SmackDown brand. At Clash at the Castle: Scotland on June 15, Niven faced Bayley for the WWE Women’s Championship, but was unsuccessful. On November 2, at Crown Jewel, Niven and Green completed in a fatal four-way tag team match for the Women’s Tag Team Championship in a losing effort. After Green became the inaugural Women's United States Championship at Saturday Night's Main Event on 14 December, Niven took on the role as Green's bodyguard (dubbed as Green's Secret Hervice, a pun on Secret Service). On the 8 March 2025 episode of SmackDown, fellow Scot Alba Fyre aligned herself with Green and formed a tag team with Niven as the Secret Hervice, with the stable being known as The Green Regime. In September 2025, it was reported that Niven had suffered a serious neck injury and would be out of action indefinitely.

== Professional wrestling style and persona ==
Benson's finishing move is the Loch Ness Slam, a spinning side slam.

During her alliance with Chelsea Green following the loss of the Women's Tag Team Championships and Green's coronation as the inaugural Women's United States Champion, Benson's character took on the role of the United States Secret Service protection agent.

== Other media ==
Benson is the subject of the episode Fight Like a Girl of the documentary series Our Lives by BBC. The episode is about her life as a professional wrestler.

Benson made her video game debut in the Clowning Around Pack DLC for WWE 2K22 and appeared in WWE 2K23, WWE 2K24 and WWE 2K25.

== Personal life ==
On Celebrate Bisexuality Day 2019, Benson came out as bisexual. She has also shared that she has Bell's palsy. In a 2022 interview with Sports Illustrated, Benson spoke about her relationship with her weight and appearance growing up, saying she had once believed she "couldn't get any smaller" and did not want to be "the big girl." She said wrestling had taught her "what makes me different is what makes me special."

Benson married her husband in September 2021, which included a special highlight on WWE's website congratulating the couple.

== Championships and accomplishments ==
- Alpha Omega Wrestling
  - AOW Women's Championship (1 time)
- Association Biterroise de Catch
  - ABC Women's Championship (1 time)
- Fierce Females
  - Fierce Females Championship (1 time)
- Insane Championship Wrestling
  - ICW Women's Championship (2 times)
  - ICW Women's Championship Tournament (2015)
- Preston City Wrestling
  - PCW Women's Championship (1 time)
- Pro-Wrestling: EVE
  - Pro-Wrestling: EVE Championship (1 time)
  - Pro-Wrestling: EVE International Championship (1 time)
  - Pro Wrestling: EVE International Championship Tournament (2018)
- Pro Wrestling Illustrated
  - Ranked No. 37 of the top 50 female wrestlers in the PWI Female 50 in 2017
- Scottish Wrestling Entertainment
  - SWE Future Division Championship (1 time)
- Showcase Pro Wrestling
  - Caledonian Cup (2014)
- World of Sport Wrestling
  - WOS Women's Championship (2 times)
- World Wide Wrestling League
  - W3L Women's Championship (1 time)
- World Wonder Ring Stardom
  - Artist of Stardom Championship (1 time) – with HZK and Io Shirai
  - SWA World Championship (1 time)
  - Trios Tag Team Tournament (2019) – with Bea Priestley and Utami Hayashishita
  - 5★Star GP Award (1 time)
    - 5★Star GP Outstanding Performance Award (2017)
- WWE
  - WWE Women's Tag Team Championship (1 time) – with Chelsea Green
  - WWE 24/7 Championship (2 times)
