= Insane Championship Wrestling =

Scottish professional wrestling promotion

- Acronym: ICW
- Founded: 2006
- Style: Sports entertainment; Hardcore wrestling
- Headquarters: Glasgow, Scotland
- Founder: Mark Dallas
- Owner: Duncan Gray
- Website: InsaneWrestling.co.uk

Insane Championship Wrestling (ICW) is a professional wrestling promotion based in Glasgow, Scotland, founded by Mark Dallas in 2006. It mixes elements of traditional sports entertainment with hardcore wrestling; thus admittance is restricted to those over 18 years old.

The company began expanding across the UK, and was featured in a Vice Magazine documentary in 2012 and BBC documentary in 2014. It was named UK Promotion of the Year by Fighting Spirit Magazine in 2012, 2013, 2014 and 2018.

ICW formerly aired on cable television station MyChannel across Europe. ICW records and releases the majority of their shows on limited edition DVD as well as producing series of their own YouTube show, ICW Worldwide. In 2015, ICW launched their On Demand service (ICW On Demand), which has become the company's primary source of distribution of content.

On August 13, 2020, it was announced that ICW content would be available on WWE's video on-demand service, WWE Network.

== History ==
=== 2006–2012 ===
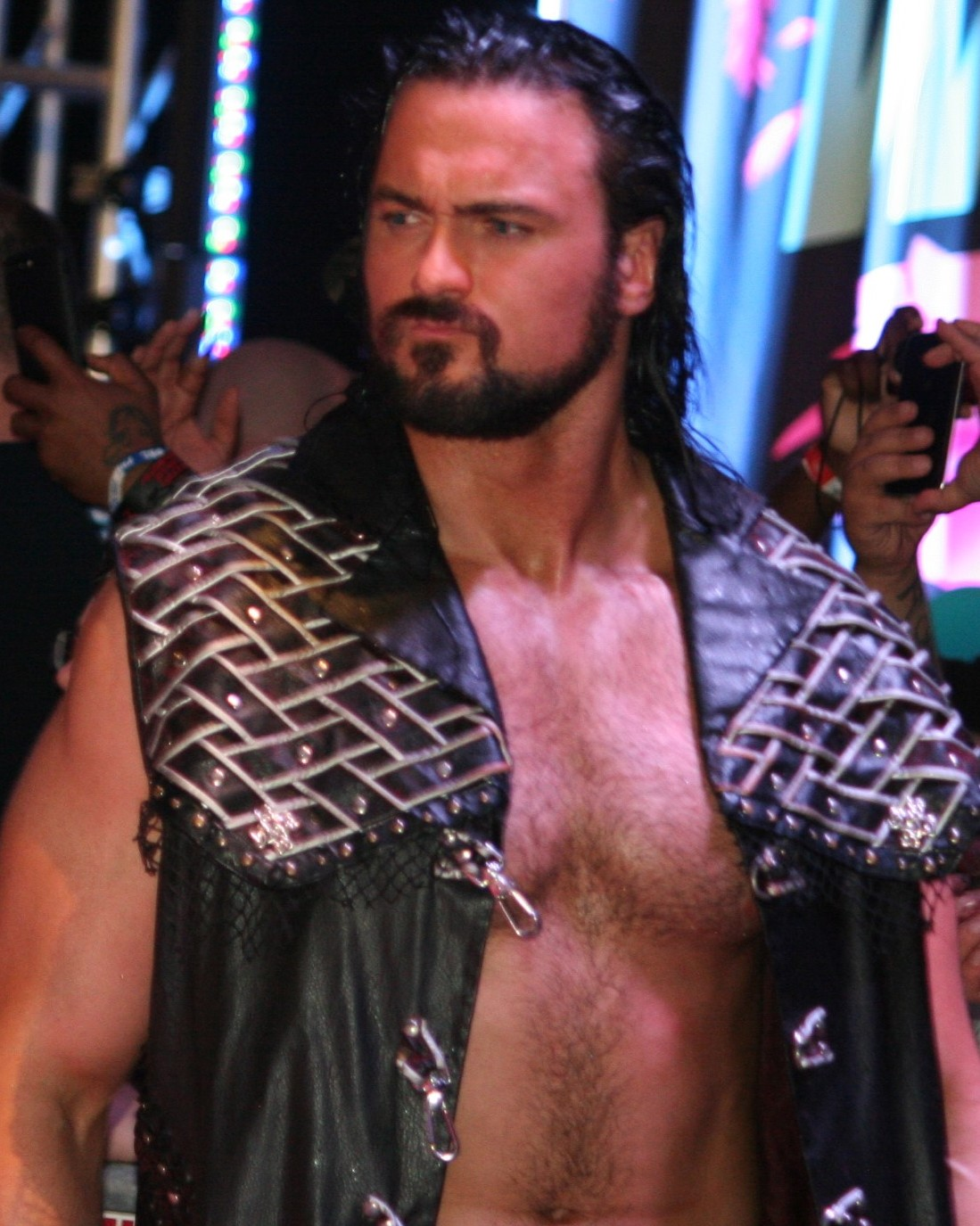
ICW's inaugural champion was Drew Galloway, who remained an important figure over the course of ICW's history

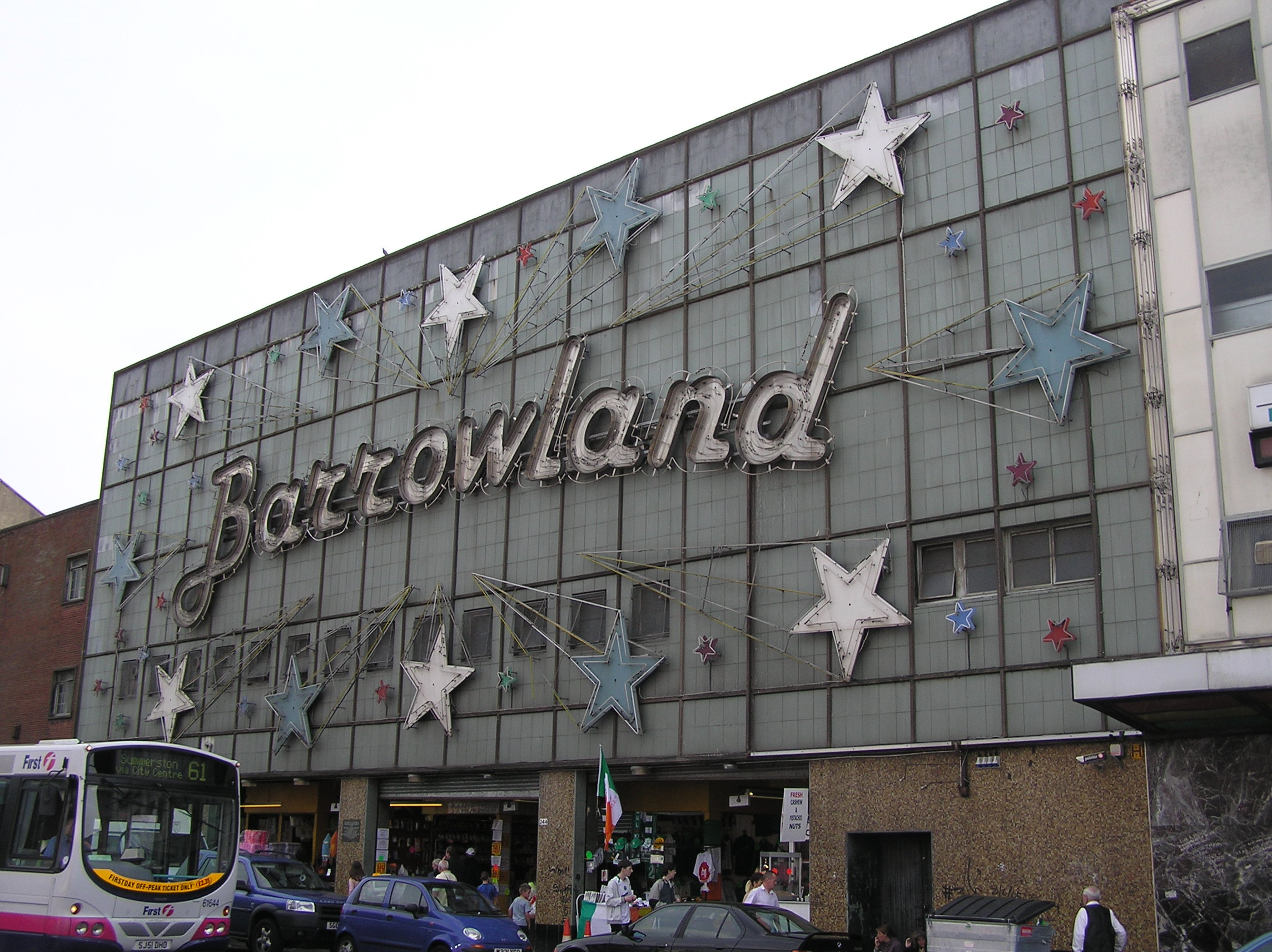
The Barrowland Ballroom, venue of ICW Fear & Loathing VII

Mark Dallas founded the promotion while living with his girlfriend in Glasgow's Red Road Flats in 2006. After attending wrestling training to learn the business from the inside, he ran his first shows at Maryhill Community Centre. Drew Galloway was crowned the company's inaugural Heavyweight Champion on 15 October 2006 after defeating Darkside and Allan Grogan in a three-way match at ICW: Fear & Loathing. Galloway held the title until 22 July 2007 when he was defeated by Darkside. After an almost 2-year hiatus, ICW returned on 9 May 2009 with ICW: Fear & Loathing, however, after another brief hiatus, the company began running shows every other month beginning with ICW: Payback on 28 February 2010.

On 5 June 2010, ICW: Menace 2 Society, a new ICW Heavyweight Champion was crowned for the first time in over three years as BT Gunn won the vacant title in a 4-way match against Wolfgang, Liam Thomson and Johnny Moss. The event also kicked off a tournament for a secondary title, the ICW Zero-G Championship. Another title change occurred on 4 September 2010 at ICW: Dazed and Confused when moments after defeating Red Lightning, BT Gunn was challenged by James Scott who won the match and joined the villainous Gold Label faction.

ICW: Fear & Loathing 3 signaled ICW's first venture into Glasgow City Center with the event taking place at Apollo 23 nightclub on 21 November 2010. The finals of the Zero-G Championship Tournament took place with Noam Dar defeating Andy Wild, Falcon and Rob Cage in a four-way elimination match. The Zero-G Championship was briefly dropped by Dar to Lionheart at ICW: Summerbam on 14 August 2011 before winning the title back at ICW: Fear & Loathing 4 on 23 November.

=== 2012–2023 ===
2012 saw the introduction of a new event on 22 January, Square Go!. This event was headlined by an over-the-top-rope battle royal granting the winner a shot at the ICW Heavyweight Championship at a time of their choosing. ICW's next event, ICW: Smells like Teen Spirit, took place in The Garage venue, in Glasgow; the venue would later host many ICW shows. The beginning of the year saw ICW gain TV exposure through MyChannel, although their tenure on the station was short-lived as they were removed from programming after one of their shows was shown at an inappropriate time.

During the summer, the ICW Tag Team Championship was introduced and, after a series of elimination matches, STI (Dickie Divers & William Grange) defeated The Bucky Boys (Davie Boy & Stevie Boy) for the titles at ICW: Hadouken!.

After the airing of an in-house mockumentary and his prominent role in the Vice documentary, Grado became prominent in the promotion of ICW. At the 2nd Annual Square Go!, Mikey Whiplash secured his opportunity at the Heavyweight Championship while ICW ventured out of Glasgow for the first time with a show at Studio 24 in Edinburgh. In Edinburgh at ICW: Tramspotting, qualifying matches would begin for the new ICW Fierce Females Championship. The Tag Team Championship changed hands for the first time with STI losing their titles to The Bucky Boys in a ladder match at ICW: Get To Da Choppa. At ICW: Reservoir Dogs, ICW announced that they were being filmed as the subject of a BBC documentary.

On 7 February 2015, the ICW Heavyweight Championship was renamed the ICW World Heavyweight Championship following title defenses in England, Denmark and the United States by Drew Galloway. On 27 February 2016, ICW had their first show in Ireland named The Big Elbowski, where Big Damo defeated Chris Renfrew for the ICW World Heavyweight Championship.

On 20 November 2016, ICW ran the Fear & Loathing IX PPV at the SSE Hydro, which was their biggest event to date and featured Kurt Angle, Team 3D, Ricochet, Finn Balor and others.

On 5 November 2017, on a Road to Fear and Loathing X tour show in Cardiff, Triple H and NXT United Kingdom Champion Pete Dunne made a special guest appearance.

Three days later, Lionheart died by suicide, causing the ICW title to be vacated. Stevie Boy defeated Wolfgang for the vacant title at Shug's Hoose Party 6 on 28 July 2019.

=== 2023–present ===
Leyton Buzzard, who had won the ICW World Heavyweight Championship Fear & Loathing XIV on 20 November 2022, became ICW's first champion to defend the World Championship outside of the UK since 2018. Inspired by Drew Galloway's internationally recognised reign, which spanned multiple countries, Buzzard eventually broke some of Galloway's records for international defences with matches in Italy, Spain, Ireland, Sweden, Germany and Canada.

In January 2023, ICW announced that its deal with WWE had ended and their library would no longer be available through the WWE Network and Peacock. ICW began airing its weekly TV and events through FITE, this began with The 11th Annual Square Go airing as a PPV on 26 February 2023, during which it was announced that ICW would be airing its events via FITE+ going forward. The first major event of this partnership was Get The F Out! on 14 May 2023.

== Events ==
The promotion currently books most of its events in Glasgow with occasional events in Edinburgh. As the company grows, it has expanded to the rest of the UK, having held events in London and Newcastle with shows in Liverpool, Leeds and Birmingham booked in the future as part of a working relationship with O2 Academy venues. ICW runs shows in Glasgow's The Garage and Studio 24 in Edinburgh as well as ABC Glasgow until its closure due to a fire.

As Fear & Loathing got bigger, ICW went on to host events at SEC Centre, and in 2016 held the biggest event in European wrestling since the Dale Martin Wembley Arena shows of the early '80s in Glasgow's OVO Hydro with a claimed over 6000 attendees. Fear & Loathing would be held at the OVO Hydro in the two years following, featuring the likes of Rey Mysterio, Rob Van Dam, Noam Dar & James Storm.

In July 2018 after a recent fire that caused damage to O2 ABC Glasgow, ICW had to reschedule their 2-day summer event Shugs Hoose Party 5 to Glasgow's O2 Academy for the first time ever.

In February 2019, ICW announced the first ever 'King Of Hawners' tournament, taking place on the 26 & 27 May, with 8 trios teams competing in the inaugural tournament. Bad Company (BT Gunn, Krobar & Stevie James) defeated The Wild Boys (Aaron Echo, Andy Wild & Kieran Kelly) in the finals to win the tournament.

== Streaming ==
ICW On Demand was a video-on-demand service owned by Insane Championship Wrestling. All major ICW events were uploaded on the service shortly after taking place. The service also featured matches from the promotion's archives, dating back to 2012. Retrospectives of pre-2012 events, shoot interviews and documentaries were also available.

ICW programming was streamed on the WWE Network during the COVID-19 pandemic. Per the end of the WWE Network deal in 2023, all new ICW programming is now streamed on Triller TV (formerly known as Fite+).

In December 2024, it was announced that all previous ICW programming would be uploaded to YouTube on a new video-on-demand service, ICW: The Vault. This uploaded all programming that had previously been featured on the WWE Network and that was lost with the transfer.

== Championships and accomplishments ==
=== Current championships ===
Championship	Current champion(s)	Reign	Date won	Days held	Location	Notes	Ref.
ICW World Heavyweight Championship	Mark Coffey	1	May 24, 2026	124+	Glasgow, Scotland	Cashed in his "Square Go!" briefcase and defeated Jason Reed (who had earlier defeated Rhio and Dylan Thorn in a triple threat match on the same show) at ICW: Wubba Lubba Dub Dub	
ICW Zero-G Championship	Myles Kayman	1	June 20, 2026	97+	Newcastle, England	Defeated Wolfgang, Daz Black and Henry Faust in a four way match at Insane NORTH Weekender - Night 1.	
ICW Tag Team Championship	The Dangerous Brothers (BT Gunn and Kez Evans)	1	March 29, 2026	180+	Glasgow, Scotland	Defeated Arcade Violence (Brody Turnbull and Jake Lawless) and KoE (Adam King and Marcus King) in a triple threat tag team match at ICW So's Yer Maw III.	
ICW Women's World Championship	Molly Spartan	2	June 21, 2026	96+	Newcastle, England	Defeated Angel Hayze at Insane NORTH Weekender - Night 2.	

=== Other Championships Recognised by ICW ===
Championship	Current champion(s)	Reign	Date won	Days held	Location	Notes	Ref.
1PW Openweight Championship	Inactive	N/A	N/A	N/A	Lincoln, Lincolnshire	Title defended in ICW by James Wallace vs. BT Gunn at ReZerection on 22 July 2007.	
BCW Cruiserweight Championship	Inactive	N/A	N/A	N/A	Kilmarnock, Scotland	Title defended in ICW by final Champion Red Lightning vs. Liam Thomson at Stop! He's Already Dead! on 17 December 2006.	
UEWA European Heavyweight Championship	BT Gunn	1	16 March, 2025	558+	Glasgow, Scotland	Title defended in ICW by Alexander Dean vs. Lionheart at I Ain't Yer Pal, Dickface! on 16 July 2019 and by Andy Wild vs. Liam Thomson at Live in Bathgate on 28 August 2019.	

=== Square Go! Briefcase Holders ===
In a combination of WWE's Royal Rumble and Money in the Bank matches, the competitors compete in a 30-man over-the-top-rope battle royal, the Square Go!, with the winner earning the Square Go Briefcase. This gives the holder an opportunity to cash-in the briefcase for an ICW World Heavyweight Championship match at any time of their choosing for up to one year. More recently, the contract holder has also had the option of cashing in the contract for a shot at the ICW Zero-G Championship.

Holder	Date Won	Event	Match Type	Location	Championship	Cash-In Date	Notes
Red Lightning	22 January 2012	1st Annual Square Go!	30 Man Square Go! Match	Glasgow, Scotland	ICW Heavyweight Championship	3 June 2012	Cashed in and defeated then champion BT Gunn, who had just successfully defended the ICW Heavyweight Championship against Lionheart, to win the championship at In Your Gaff
Mikey Whiplash	27 January 2013	2nd Annual Square Go!	30 Man Square Go! Match	Glasgow, Scotland	ICW Heavyweight Championship	5 May 2013	After having announced his intention to cash-in at the next show, Whiplash would go on to defeat Red Lightning at Reservoir Dogs to win the ICW Heavyweight Championship
Chris Renfrew	26 January 2014	3rd Annual Square Go!	30 Man Square Go! Match	Glasgow, Scotland	ICW Heavyweight Championship	25 January 2015	Successfully defended the briefcase against Grado at 1.21 Gigawatts, Great Scott! on 31 August 2014. Unsuccessfully cashed-in against champion, Drew Galloway, at the 4th Annual Square Go! on 25 January 2015
Dickie Divers	25 January 2015	4th Annual Square Go!	30 Man Square Go! Match	Glasgow, Scotland	N/A		
Chris Renfrew (2)	26 July 2015	Shug's Hoose Party II	Ladder	Glasgow, Scotland	ICW World Heavyweight Championship	24 January 2016	Won the briefcase from Dickie Divers in a ladder match at Shug's Hoose Party II on 26 July 2015. On 20 December 2015, Renfrew announced that he would be cashing in against World Heavyweight Champion, Grado, on 24 January 2016 at The Fifth Annual Square Go. At the event, Renfrew successfully cashed-in and defeated Grado via pinfall to win the ICW World Heavyweight Championship
Wolfgang	24 January 2016	Fifth Annual Square Go!	30 Man Square Go! Match	Glasgow, Scotland	ICW World Heavyweight Championship	31 July 2016	Successfully cashed in on Joe Coffey (who had just prior, won the championship from Big Damo) defeating him via pinfall to win the ICW World Heavyweight Championship at Shug's Hoose Party 3
Joe Coffey	5 February 2017	Sixth Annual Square Go!	30 Man Square Go! Match	Newcastle, England	ICW World Heavyweight Championship	16 April 2017	Announced his intention to cash in at Barramania III on the 14 April episode of Fight Club (recorded 19 March), and successfully defeated Trent Seven by submission to win the ICW World Heavyweight Championship
Stevie Boy	11 February 2018	Seventh Annual Square Go!	30 Man Square Go! Match	Glasgow, Scotland	ICW World Heavyweight Championship	29 April 2018	At Barramania 4, Stevie retained his Square Go contract in a ladder match against Kenny Williams. He then successfully cashed it in the main event between Mikey Whiplash and BT Gunn, defeating Whiplash via pinfall to win the ICW World Heavyweight Championship
RUDO Lightning (2)	24 February 2019	Eighth Annual Square Go!	30 Man Square Go! Match	Glasgow, Scotland	ICW World Heavyweight Championship	27 October 2019	First 2-time winner of the Square Go match, and the second to hold the Square Go contract twice. Unsuccessfully cashed-in against champion, Stevie Boy, at ICW: France 2000 on 27 October 2019
Kez Evans	2 February 2020	Ninth Annual Square Go!	30 Man Square Go Match	Glasgow, Scotland	ICW Zero-G Championship	10 April 2021	Evans successfully cashed in his contract on Craig Anthony on an episode of ICW Fight Club (aired on 10 April 2021) to win the ICW Zero-G Championship. Anthony had, just prior, defeated Daz Black to win the vacant Zero-G Championship. This cash-in marks the first occasion the contract has been cashed in for the ICW Zero-G Championship.
Leyton Buzzard	20 February 2022	Tenth Annual Square Go!	30 Man Square Go Match	Glasgow, Scotland	ICW World Heavyweight Championship	15 November 2022	Buzzard successfully cashed in his contract at Fear & Loathing XIV to defeat Evans for the ICW World Heavyweight Championship in a four-way match also involving Stevie James and Craig Anthony.
Aaron Echo	26 February 2023	Eleventh Annual Square Go!	30 Man Square Go Match	Glasgow, Scotland	ICW World Heavyweight Championship	14 May 2023	Echo successfully cashed in his contract at Get The F Out! immediately after Leyton Buzzard had retained his title against Big Damo and Andy Roberts.
Kenny Williams	10 February 2024	Twelfth Annual Square Go!	30 Man Square Go Match	Glasgow, Scotland	ICW World Heavyweight Championship	1 September 2024	Williams successfully cashed in his contract at ICW Barred III immediately after Jack Jester had retained his title against Alexander Darwin MacAllan in a Steel Cage match.
Rhio	9 February 2025	The 13th Annual Square Go!	30 Man Square Go! Match	Glasgow, Scotland	ICW World Heavyweight Championship	31 August 2025	After Kenny Williams had attacked her during an ICW Women's World Championship match vs Lana Austin, Rhio announced on 18 May 2025 that she would cash in her contract against Williams for the ICW World Heavyweight Championship at ICW I Assure You, We're Open. Rhio won the match, becoming the first woman to win the title.
Mark Coffey	8 February 2026	The 14th Annual Square Go!	30 Man Square Go! Match	Glasgow, Scotland	ICW World Heavyweight Championship	24 May 2026	Coffey successfully cashed in his contract at ICW: Wubba Lubba Dub Dub after being confronted by Jason Reed, who had won the championship earlier in the night by defeating Rhio and Dylan Thorn in a triple threat match.

=== King of Insanity ===
King of Insanity	Date Won	Event	Location	Notes
Stevie Boy	19 November 2017	Fear & Loathing X	Glasgow, Scotland	Defeated Mikey Whiplash, Chris Renfrew and Jimmy Havoc to become the inaugural King of Insanity.
BT Gunn	21 November 2021	Fear & Loathing XIII (Night 2)	Glasgow, Scotland	Defeated Stevie Boy. Defended against Leyton Buzzard.
Jack Jester	20 November 2022	Fear & Loathing XIV	Glasgow, Scotland	Defeated BT Gunn. Defended against Theo Doros. Defended against Aaron Echo.
Kenny Williams	17 November 2024	Fear & Loathing XVI	Glasgow, Scotland	Defeated Jack Jester in a King of Insanity match for the ICW World Heavyweight Championship.

=== Queen of Insanity ===
Queen of Insanity	Date Won	Event	Location	Notes
Kay Lee Ray	2 December 2018	Fear & Loathing XI	Glasgow, Scotland	Defeated Viper to become the inaugural Queen of Insanity and win the ICW Women's Championship.
Rhio	7 December 2025	Fear & Loathing XVII	Glasgow, Scotland	Defeated Kenny Williams in a King of Insanity match to retain the ICW World Heavyweight Championship.

== Personnel ==
Name	Notes
Duncan Grey	Director of Operations
Mark Dallas	Former Owner, Founder, Executive Producer
Scott Reid	Director of Creative/Producer
Lee Greig	Director of Talent Development
Billy Kirkwood	Lead Commentator
Ryan Fitzsimmons	Commentator
Simon Cassidy	M.C
Thomas Kearins	Director of Communications/Referee
Carson Black	Referee
Adam Carrel	Director of TV Production and Media
Veronica Lestrange	Backstage Interviewer
Katt Wolfe	Backstage Interviewer

== Hall of Fame ==
Year	Image	Ring name (Real name)	ICW recognized accolades
2016	—N/a	Carmel (Carmel Jacob)	One-time ICW Women's Champion
2018		Drew McIntyre (Andrew Galloway)	Inaugural and two-time ICW World Heavyweight Champion
2023		Lionheart (Adrian McCallum)	One-time ICW World Heavyweight Champion and two-time ICW Zero-G Champion

== See also ==
- WWE NXT UK
