= Royal Rumble (2021) =

WWE pay-per-view and livestreaming event

- Promotional poster featuring various WWE wrestlers
- Promotion: WWE
- Brand(s): Raw; SmackDown
- Date: January 31, 2021
- City: St. Petersburg, Florida
- Venue: WWE ThunderDome at Tropicana Field
- Attendance: 0 (behind closed doors) (Note: The event was held without a paying audience due to the COVID-19 pandemic in the United States, though it featured a live crowd of virtual fans via WWE's ThunderDome viewing experience.)

WWE event chronology
← Previous; Superstar Spectacle	Next → NXT TakeOver: Vengeance Day

Royal Rumble chronology
← Previous; 2020	Next → 2022

The 2021 Royal Rumble was a professional wrestling pay-per-view (PPV) and livestreaming event produced by WWE, held for wrestlers from the promotion's main roster brands, Raw and SmackDown. It was the 34th annual Royal Rumble event and took place on January 31, 2021, from the WWE ThunderDome, a bio-secure bubble that at the time was hosted at Tropicana Field in St. Petersburg, Florida. It was the sixth Royal Rumble held in the U.S. state of Florida, after 1990, 1991, 1995, 2006, and 2016, and the second in the Tampa Bay area, as 1995 was in Tampa.

The event was based around the Royal Rumble match, a modified 30-person battle royal in which the participants enter at timed intervals instead of all beginning in the ring at the same time and the respective men's and women's winners received a world championship match at WrestleMania. For the 2021 event, the winners received a choice of which championship to challenge for at WrestleMania 37. The men could choose to challenge for either Raw's WWE Championship, SmackDown's Universal Championship, or the NXT Championship, while the women had the choice between the Raw Women's Championship, the SmackDown Women's Championship, and the NXT Women's Championship. This was the last Royal Rumble in which three championships were an option for both winners, as well as the last in which NXT's championships were eligible options, as in September, NXT reverted to being WWE's developmental brand. The Royal Rumble match was created by WWE Hall of Famer Pat Patterson, who died a month before the event, making this the first Royal Rumble held following his death.

Six matches were contested at the event, including one on the Kickoff pre-show. The main event was the 2021 Men's Royal Rumble match, which was won by WWE Hall of Famer and Raw's Edge, who last eliminated Randy Orton, also from Raw, marking Edge's second win, after 2010, thus becoming the eighth two-time winner, the third wrestler to win it as the number one entrant, the fifth wrestler to win it as one of the two starting wrestlers, and the first wrestler to win it after being inducted into the WWE Hall of Fame. The 2021 Women's Royal Rumble match was won by SmackDown's Bianca Belair, who last eliminated NXT's Rhea Ripley. In other prominent matches, Roman Reigns defeated Kevin Owens in a Last Man Standing match to retain the Universal Championship and in the opening bout, Drew McIntyre defeated Goldberg to retain the WWE Championship. The men's Royal Rumble match also featured the returns of The Hurricane, Carlito, Kane, and Christian, the latter of which wrestled his final match in WWE before signing with rival promotion All Elite Wrestling in March under the ring name Christian Cage.

WWE were looking to host the 2021 Royal Rumble at a venue that could have live fans in attendance, as the promotion wanted fans for the event, even if it was just for this one show. However, the ongoing COVID-19 pandemic put a stop to those plans, and while dismantling the ThunderDome to have live fans in attendance at Tropicana Field was possible, WWE decided that the massive undertaking to do so was not worth doing for just one night. After WWE resumed live touring with full capacity crowds in July, the Royal Rumble returned to Tropicana Field in 2024. This was WWE's final main roster PPV and livestreaming event to be available on the Indian version of the WWE Network before it transferred to SonyLIV on February 21. It was also the final Royal Rumble event to livestream on the American version of the WWE Network, which merged under Peacock in April.

== Production ==
=== Background ===
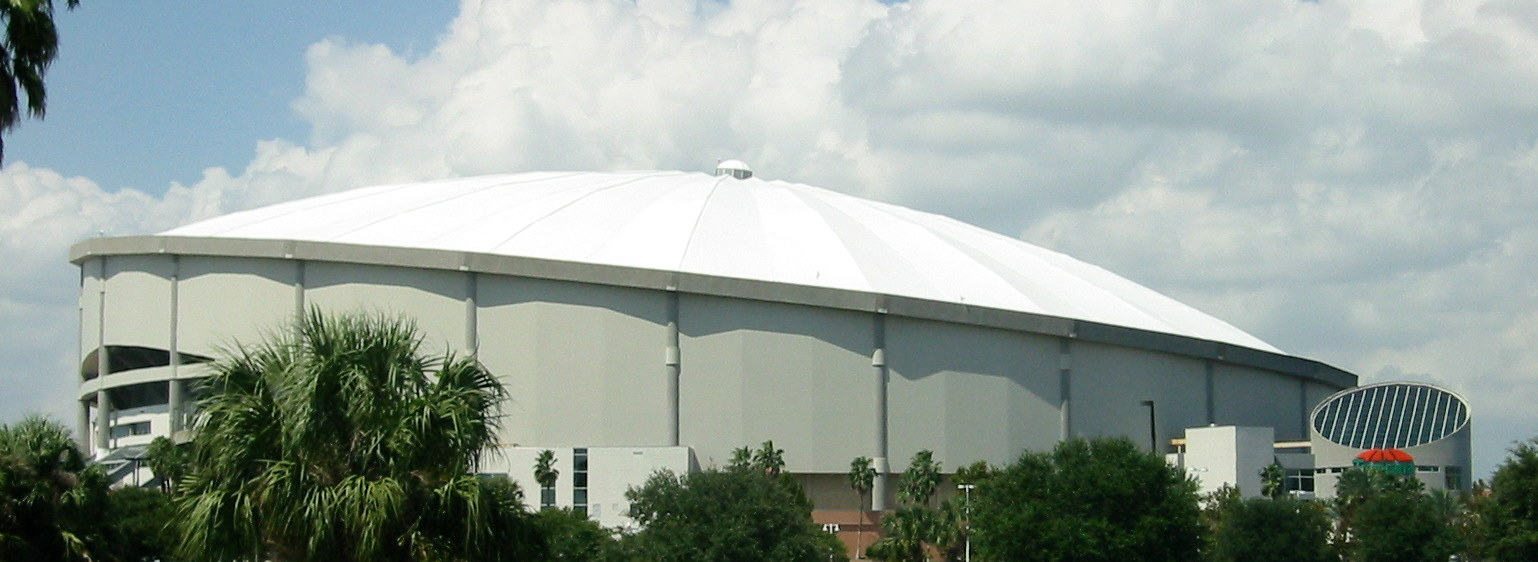
Due to the COVID-19 pandemic, the 34th annual Royal Rumble event was produced by way of a bio-secure bubble called the WWE ThunderDome, which at the time was hosted at Tropicana Field in St. Petersburg, Florida.

The Royal Rumble is an annual professional wrestling event, produced every January by WWE since 1988; that first event was a television special before it became a pay-per-view (PPV) event beginning in 1989 and then also available via livestreaming on the WWE Network since 2015. It is one of the promotion's original four PPVs, along with WrestleMania, SummerSlam, and Survivor Series, referred to as the "Big Four". It is named after and centered on the Royal Rumble match. The 34th Royal Rumble event was scheduled to be held on January 31, 2021. It featured wrestlers from the Raw and SmackDown brand divisions with a select few NXT wrestlers and WWE veterans also appearing in both the men's and women's Royal Rumble matches.

The Royal Rumble match is a modified battle royal in which the participants enter at timed intervals instead of all beginning in the ring at the same time, and the match generally features 30 wrestlers. Traditionally, the winner of the match earns a world championship match at that year's WrestleMania. For 2021, the men and women could choose which world championship to challenge for at WrestleMania 37; the men could choose Raw's WWE Championship, SmackDown's Universal Championship, or the NXT Championship, while the women could choose the Raw Women's Championship, SmackDown Women's Championship, or NXT Women's Championship.

The Royal Rumble match was created by WWE Hall of Famer Pat Patterson, and the match was originally tested at a house show in October 1987 before making its televised debut at the inaugural Royal Rumble event in 1988. Patterson died on December 2, 2020, at the age of 79, which made the 2021 event the first Royal Rumble held following his death.

==== Impact of the COVID-19 pandemic ====
As a result of the COVID-19 pandemic that began affecting the industry in mid-March 2020, WWE had to present the majority of its programming from a behind closed doors set. Initially, Raw and SmackDown's television shows and PPVs were done at the WWE Performance Center in Orlando, Florida. A limited number of Performance Center trainees and friends and family members of the wrestlers were later utilized to serve as the live audience. In late August, these programs were moved to a bio-secure bubble called the WWE ThunderDome. The select live audience was no longer utilized as the bubble allowed fans to attend the events virtually for free and be seen on the nearly 1,000 LED boards within the arena. Additionally, the ThunderDome utilized various special effects to further enhance wrestlers' entrances, and arena audio was mixed with that of the chants from the virtual fans. After being hosted at Orlando's Amway Center, the ThunderDome was relocated to Tropicana Field in St. Petersburg, Florida in December.

In November 2020, it was reported that WWE were looking to host the 2021 Royal Rumble at a venue that could have live fans in attendance, as the promotion wanted fans for the event, even if it was just for this one show. However, the ongoing pandemic put a stop to those plans, and while dismantling the ThunderDome to have live fans in attendance at Tropicana Field was possible, WWE decided that the massive undertaking to do so was not worth doing for just one night. As a result, this was the sixth Royal Rumble held in the U.S. state of Florida, after 1990, 1991, 1995, 2006, and 2016, and the second in the Tampa Bay area, after 1995 in Tampa.

Several wrestlers were also pulled from the event due to COVID-19 concerns. Retribution's Reckoning was originally booked to appear in the women's Royal Rumble match, however she tested positive for the virus and was replaced by Toni Storm. Keith Lee and Robert Roode were reportedly planned to be in the men's match, but were pulled, as was Jey Uso, who had been advertised for the match.

=== Storylines ===
The event comprised six matches, including one on the Kickoff pre-show, that resulted from scripted storylines. Results were predetermined by WWE's writers on the Raw and SmackDown brands, while storylines were produced on WWE's weekly television shows, Monday Night Raw and Friday Night SmackDown.

On the January 8 episode of SmackDown, Universal Champion Roman Reigns took issue with the recent booking decisions made by WWE official Adam Pearce, including a gauntlet match that Pearce had scheduled for that night to determine Reigns's challenger for his title at the Royal Rumble. Reigns questioned if Pearce booked himself for the match, to which Pearce responded that would have been a conflict of interest. Later, Reigns's special counsel, Paul Heyman, confronted Pearce backstage and stated that he was able to pull some strings and that Pearce would also be competing in the gauntlet match along with Rey Mysterio, Sami Zayn, Shinsuke Nakamura, King Corbin, and Daniel Bryan. Nakamura survived the gauntlet to face final entrant Pearce; however, before the final round began, Reigns's cousin, Jey Uso, taunted Nakamura, which led to Reigns and Jey attacking both Nakamura and Pearce. Jey placed Pearce on top of Nakamura for the pinfall, thus Pearce won the match. The following week, Heyman confronted Pearce backstage and gave him the match contract to sign. The stipulation for their match was originally a no disqualification match; after Heyman gave the signed contract to Reigns, however, Reigns wanted the stipulation changed to a Last Man Standing match. Later in the ring, Pearce and Reigns signed the amended contract, but as Pearce was leaving, he feigned a knee injury, citing that the contract allowed him to choose a replacement for himself in the event of an injury and chose Kevin Owens, who Reigns defeated at TLC: Tables, Ladders & Chairs in a Tables, Ladders, and Chairs match thanks to interference from Jey. Owens then made his entrance and signed the contract to become Reigns's opponent for the Universal Championship at the Royal Rumble.

Following Drew McIntyre's successful WWE Championship defense during the special "Legends Night" episode of Raw on January 4, WWE Hall of Famer Goldberg, in his first appearance since WrestleMania 36 in 2020, appeared to confront McIntyre. After Goldberg praised McIntyre's work and abilities, he stated that McIntyre did not have respect, claiming that McIntyre viewed the legends as being "washed up" and that McIntyre felt he was better than any of them when they were in their prime. Goldberg then formally challenged McIntyre for the WWE Championship at the Royal Rumble. McIntyre responded that Goldberg was not the man he used to be and that facing him would be like facing his own dad. Goldberg then taunted and shoved McIntyre, who rose to his feet and stared down Goldberg. The following week, McIntyre refuted Goldberg's claim and said that he actually did have respect but that he was going to reject Goldberg's challenge until Goldberg pushed him, prompting him to accept the challenge and make the match official. McIntyre had accepted Goldberg's challenge via satellite as during that same episode, he announced that he had tested positive for COVID-19; following the standard 14-day quarantine procedure, McIntyre was cleared for the Royal Rumble, appearing live on Raw on the January 25 episode to have a final face-to-face meeting with Goldberg before their match.

At TLC, Sasha Banks retained the SmackDown Women's Championship against Carmella. Over the next couple of weeks, Carmella continuously taunted Banks, yearning for a rematch. On the January 15 episode of SmackDown, Banks stated that she would give Carmella a rematch only if she faced Carmella's sommelier, Reginald, in a match first. The intergender match occurred the following week, in which Banks defeated Reginald. Banks kept her promise and a title rematch between Banks and Carmella was scheduled for the Royal Rumble.

At TLC, Charlotte Flair and Asuka defeated Nia Jax and Shayna Baszler to win the WWE Women's Tag Team Championship. On January 25, a championship rematch between the two teams was scheduled for the Royal Rumble, and was later scheduled for the Kickoff pre-show.

== Event ==
Other on-screen personnel
Role:	Name:
English commentators	Michael Cole (SmackDown/Men's Royal Rumble match)
English commentators	Corey Graves (SmackDown/Men's Royal Rumble match)
English commentators	Tom Phillips (Raw/Women's Royal Rumble match)
English commentators	Samoa Joe (Raw/Men's Royal Rumble match)
English commentators	Byron Saxton (Raw/Women's Royal Rumble match)
English commentators	Jerry Lawler (Women's Royal Rumble match)
Spanish commentators	Carlos Cabrera
Spanish commentators	Marcelo Rodriguez
Ring announcers	Greg Hamilton (SmackDown/Men's Royal Rumble match)
Ring announcers	Mike Rome (Raw/Women's Royal Rumble match)
Referees	Danilo Anfibio
Referees	Jason Ayers
Referees	Shawn Bennett
Referees	Jessika Carr
Referees	John Cone
Referees	Darrick Moore
Referees	Eddie Orengo
Referees	Chad Patton
Referees	Rod Zapata
Interviewers	Kayla Braxton
Interviewers	Sarah Schreiber
Pre-show panel	Charly Caruso
Pre-show panel	Booker T
Pre-show panel	Jerry Lawler
Pre-show panel	John "Bradshaw" Layfield
Pre-show panel	Peter Rosenberg
Pre-show panel	Sonya Deville

=== Pre-show ===
During the Royal Rumble Kickoff pre-show, Asuka and Charlotte Flair defended the WWE Women's Tag Team Championship against Nia Jax and Shayna Baszler. During the match, Ric Flair came out with Lacey Evans to distract his daughter—continuing a storyline from Raw. As Charlotte applied the Figure Eight Leglock on Baszler, Evans broke it up. The climax saw Evans perform the Women's Right on Charlotte, after which Jax performed a leg drop on her to regain the titles, thus Jax and Baszler became record-tying two-time champions, both as a team and individually.

=== Preliminary matches ===
The actual event opened with Drew McIntyre defending the WWE Championship against Goldberg. Before the match could officially begin, McIntyre performed a Glasgow Kiss and a Spear on Goldberg, taking him out of the ring. But at ringside, Goldberg responded with a throw into a steel steps and a Spear on McIntyre through the barricade. Goldberg returned to the ring and after McIntyre also managed to return to the ring, the match officially began. McIntyre performed a Claymore Kick on Goldberg for a nearfall. As McIntyre attempted a second Claymore Kick, Goldberg dodged it and performed two more Spears for a nearfall. Then, Goldberg performed a Jackhammer on McIntyre for a nearfall. As Goldberg attempted a fourth Spear, McIntyre dodged it and performed a second Claymore Kick for a pinfall, retaining the WWE Championship. Aftermath, Goldberg rose to his feet and endorsed McIntyre with a handshake, declaring that he passed the test. In a mutual respect response, McIntyre and Goldberg embraced.

Next, Sasha Banks defended the SmackDown Women's Championship against Carmella (accompanied by her sommelier, Reginald). During the match, as Banks threw Carmella out of the ring, Reginald caught Carmella. Banks then performed a head scissors takeover and a Forearm on Reginald. The referee ejected Reginald from ringside. In the end, Banks applied the Bank Statement on Carmella, forcing her to tap, thus retaining the title, to end their feud.

Following the match, Bad Bunny performed his song "Booker T" with two-time WWE Hall of Famer Booker T himself making an appearance.

After that, the 30-woman Royal Rumble match was contested. Bayley and the returning Naomi entered the match as the first and second entrants, respectively. Bianca Belair entered third, and due to their ongoing rivalry from SmackDown, Belair immediately attempted to eliminate Bayley, who avoided being eliminated. Instead of participating in the match, Billie Kay (#4) would join the ringside announcers for commentary. Kay attempted to team up with the next three entrants, Shotzi Blackheart (#5), Shayna Baszler (#6), and Toni Storm (#7), to take on the other participants in the match, however they all brushed her off. Kay eventually teamed up with guest entrant and former WWE wrestler Jillian Hall (#8) and Kay officially entered the match, however she eventually turned on Hall and eliminated her. Shortly thereafter, Kay was also eliminated. Midway through the match, Lacey Evans (#18) entered, accompanied by Ric Flair, while wearing his signature robe in an attempt to taunt Charlotte Flair (#15). Immediately after former WWE wrestler Alicia Fox (#21) entered, 24/7 Champion R-Truth ran to the ring. Several other male 24/7 Title challengers appeared and ran after Truth, who then ran into the ring. As Truth fended them off, Fox pinned Truth to win the 24/7 Championship. Mandy Rose (#22) then eliminated Fox, after which Truth pinned Fox outside the ring to regain the title. As Carmella (#24 – accompanied by Reginald) entered, Nikki Cross (#20) attempted to eliminate Carmella, however Reginald caught Carmella, thus saving her from elimination. As Tamina (#25) made her way to the ring, she attacked Reginald, accidentally dropping Carmella, thus causing her elimination inadvertently. Rhea Ripley (#14) then eliminated Alexa Bliss (#27) before Bliss could transform into her alter-ego Fiend-esque persona (due to her alignment with "The Fiend" Bray Wyatt). The final four were Flair, Ripley, Belair, and Natalya, who earned the #30 spot by defeating Tamina the previous day on WWE Backstage. After Natalya was quickly eliminated, Belair and Ripley teamed together and eliminated Flair. In the end, after a back-and-forth battle, Belair eliminated Ripley to win the match and earn herself a women's championship match at WrestleMania 37. Belair also became the second wrestler to win the match as the third entrant, after Ric Flair in 1992. Following the match, an emotional Belair celebrated her win.

In the penultimate match, Roman Reigns (accompanied by Paul Heyman) defended the Universal Championship against Kevin Owens in a Last Man Standing match. At the start of the match, Reigns performed a Superman Punch on Owens only for Owens to rise to his feet. Owens countered a Spear from Reigns into a Pop-up Powerbomb, however Reigns rose to his feet at the 4 count. Midway, the two fought at ringside where Reigns viciously attacked Owens with the steel steps. Reigns then threw Owens through an announce table from the LED boards of the ThunderDome arena. Owens and Reigns fought backstage where Reigns drove a golf cart into Owens. Owens then performed a Senton Bomb on Reigns off a forklift through a table. In the end, Owens handcuffed Reigns to a lighting trellis. Unable to get to his feet and avoid losing, Reigns incapacitated the referee by shoving him into the trellis. Heyman then appeared and successfully freed Reigns from the cuffs (after the second referee stopped his count for no reason provided). Reigns then applied the guillotine choke on Owens, incapacitating him and preventing Owens from rising to his feet by the count of 10, thus Reigns retained the title.

=== Main event ===
In the main event, the 30-man Royal Rumble match was contested. Hall of Famer Edge, returning from a triceps tear, and Raw's Randy Orton started the match as the first and second entrants, respectively. The two fought at ringside before the match officially began. They eventually fought into the ring and the match began. Orton, along with SmackDown's Sami Zayn (#3) and Mustafa Ali (#4), began to triple team Edge, however he fought them off and performed a Spear on Orton, who rolled out of the ring under the bottom rope. Edge followed Orton soon after and the two continued to brawl at ringside.

In his first appearance since 2010, Carlito made a surprise return at #8, however he was eliminated by Elias (#13). NXT's Damian Priest (#14) then eliminated Elias. It was then shown that medical personnel tended to Orton backstage and Edge returned to the match soon after. Due to Bad Bunny rejecting The Miz's offer in a backstage segment earlier, Miz (#15) proceeded to destroy Bad Bunny's DJ equipment on the stage and then celebrated with his tag team partner, John Morrison (#11). An irate Bad Bunny then came out, distracting Miz and Morrison, who were eliminated by Priest. Bad Bunny then performed a cross body on Miz and Morrison outside the ring. Kane (#18) made a surprise return and after a brief Team Hell No reunion, he chokeslammed Daniel Bryan (#17) but was then eliminated by Priest. Later in the match, Christian (#24) made his surprise return to in-ring action, his first official match since 2014. After entering the ring and reuniting with Edge, the two embraced. Seth Rollins (#29) then made a surprise return from his two-month hiatus, followed by Braun Strowman (#30), who had made an appearance at the end of the previous episode of SmackDown following a two-month suspension.

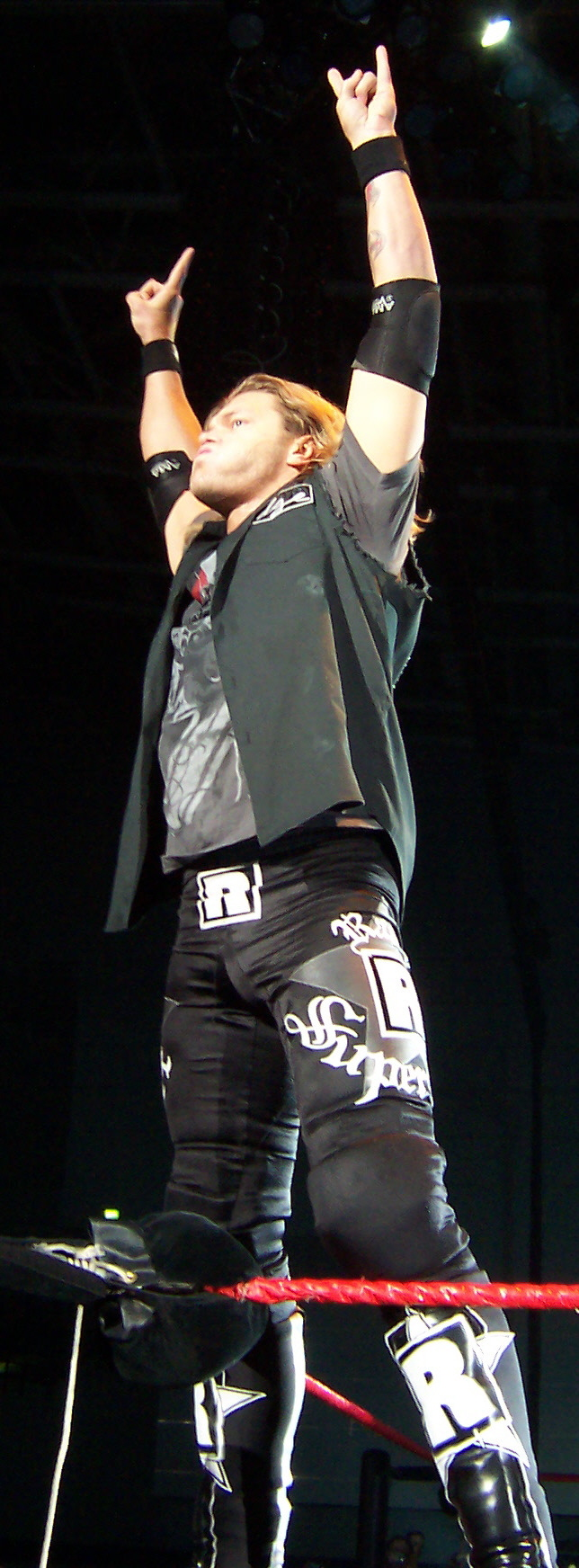
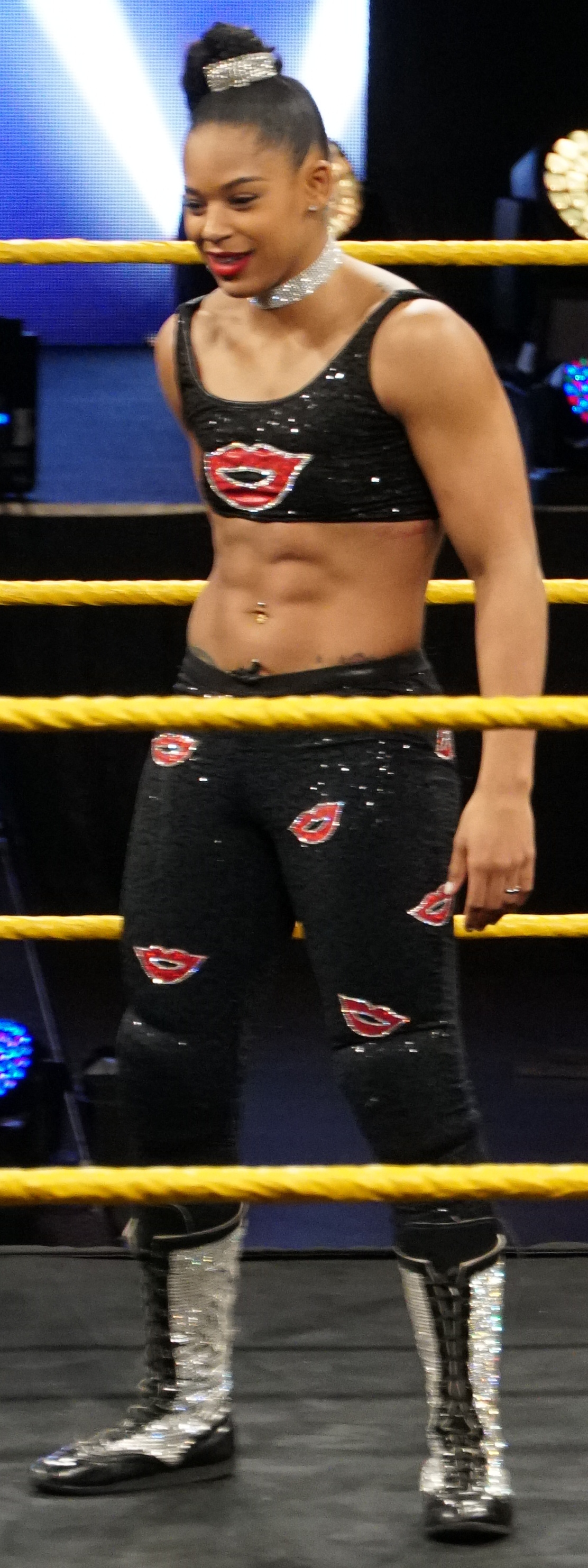
Edge and Bianca Belair were the respective winners of the men's and women's Royal Rumble matches.

The final five were Edge, Christian, Rollins, Strowman, and Orton (unbeknownst to the rest at this time as he had not returned from his injury earlier). Rollins convinced Strowman to work together and eliminate Edge and Christian, however Strowman turned on Rollins soon after. As Strowman tried to eliminate Edge, Christian tried to assist Edge to eliminate Strowman. Rollins would eliminate Christian, which helped give leverage to Edge to simultaneously eliminate Strowman. Edge then eliminated Rollins soon after. Immediately following Rollins' elimination, Orton returned to the match and performed an RKO on Edge. Orton then attempted to eliminate Edge, however he countered and eliminated Orton 11 years to the day of his first Rumble match victory, and earning himself a world championship match at WrestleMania 37. Edge became the eighth wrestler to win the Royal Rumble match twice, the third wrestler to win the match as the number one entrant (after Shawn Michaels in 1995 and Chris Benoit in 2004), and the first wrestler to win a Royal Rumble match after being inducted into the WWE Hall of Fame. Additionally, this was only the third time that the first and second entrants lasted the entire match and finished as the final two (last occurring in 1995 and 1999).

== Aftermath ==
This was WWE's final main roster PPV and livestreaming event to be available on the Indian version of the WWE Network before it transferred to SonyLIV on February 21. This was also the final Royal Rumble event to livestream on the American version of the WWE Network, which merged under Peacock in April.

=== Raw ===
The following night on Raw, WWE Champion Drew McIntyre opened the show and stated that Goldberg had earned his respect and he had also earned Goldberg's respect. McIntyre was then interrupted by men's Royal Rumble winner Edge. McIntyre complimented Edge, however Edge took issue as he thought that McIntyre would be more aggressive. After Edge teased that he would choose McIntyre as his opponent at WrestleMania 37, McIntyre's friend Sheamus came out, stating that he was not as nice as his friend. McIntyre then asked Edge about his decision and Edge stated he would reveal his choice in due time. After Edge left the ring, Sheamus performed a Brogue Kick on McIntyre, sending a direct message that he was no longer McIntyre's friend and wanted the WWE Championship. The following week, McIntyre was scheduled to defend the WWE Championship in an Elimination Chamber match at Elimination Chamber, also involving Sheamus and four other former WWE Champions, while Edge said he would wait until after that event to make his decision.

Unsatisfied with Edge's victory in the Royal Rumble and his victory over Edge in "The Greatest Wrestling Match Ever" back at Backlash in 2020, Randy Orton challenged Edge to one final match on Raw. In the main event, Edge defeated Orton thanks to a distraction from Alexa Bliss (continuing a storyline between Orton, Bliss, and "The Fiend" Bray Wyatt), putting an end to Edge and Orton's rivalry.

Also on the following night's episode of Raw, former WWE Women's Tag Team Champions Asuka and Charlotte Flair participated in a triple threat tag team match to earn an opportunity at a rematch for the titles against new champions Nia Jax and Shayna Baszler, which also involved the teams of Naomi and Lana and Dana Brooke and Mandy Rose. Thanks to another distraction by Ric Flair and Lacey Evans, however, the match was won by Naomi and Lana. The following week, Evans defeated Charlotte by disqualification, again thanks to Ric, to earn a Raw Women's Championship match against Asuka at Elimination Chamber. Women's Royal Rumble winner Bianca Belair also appeared that episode and teased that she would choose the Raw Women's Championship if Asuka retained at Elimination Chamber.

Bad Bunny was a guest on "Miz TV". The Miz and John Morrison apologized for their actions at the Royal Rumble, which Bad Bunny accepted; however, Bad Bunny did not apologize for his own actions. Bad Bunny then stated that one of his dreams was to become a WWE wrestler, which Miz claimed he could help him with as a mentor (referencing when he was a mentor to Daniel Bryan in 2010), however Bad Bunny rejected the offer. Bad Bunny then stated the only reason he was there was because his "friend" wanted to be on Miz TV, prompting Damian Priest to come out, making his Raw debut. Priest then came out and attacked Miz. A match between Priest and Miz ensued where Priest emerged victorious. Over the next few weeks, Miz and Morrison continued to constantly taunt Bad Bunny. On the March 22 episode of Raw, Miz challenged Bad Bunny to a match at WrestleMania 37. After Miz's match, Bad Bunny attacked Miz and accepted. However, after Miz and Morrison vandalized Bad Bunny's US$3 million Bugatti and attacked Bad Bunny on the April 5 episode, the stipulation of the match was changed as Priest and Bad Bunny challenged Miz and Morrison to a tag team match that Miz and Morrison accepted.

=== NXT ===
The following Wednesday on NXT, men's Royal Rumble winner Edge made a special appearance. He talked about how seeing the passion, drive, and focus on wrestling in NXT helped motivate him to make his comeback. He told NXT Champion Finn Bálor and Bálor's TakeOver: Vengeance Day opponent Pete Dunne that he would be watching their match, and regardless of who won, it could influence his decision on which world championship he would challenge for at WrestleMania 37, teasing the possibility that Edge may choose the NXT Championship.

The 2021 Royal Rumble was the last Royal Rumble in which three championships were an option for the Royal Rumble winners, as well as the last Royal Rumble in which NXT's championship were options for the winners, as in September 2021, NXT was rebranded as "NXT 2.0" and reverted to being WWE's developmental brand.

=== SmackDown ===
On Friday's SmackDown, Universal Champion Roman Reigns opened the show, accompanied by Paul Heyman and Jey Uso. He stated that he kept his word in that he would defeat Kevin Owens. He then turned his attention to men's Royal Rumble winner Edge, assuming that Edge would choose to challenge him at WrestleMania 37. Reigns called out Edge, who had not arrived at the arena yet. Reigns then demanded that Edge reveal his decision before the end of the night. Later that night, Edge came out and questioned himself on who he should challenge, either WWE Champion Drew McIntyre, NXT Champion Finn Bálor, or the Universal Champion, who then came out, accompanied by Heyman and Jey. Reigns then demanded that Edge choose him, however, before Edge could answer, Owens attacked Reigns with a Stunner from behind. At Elimination Chamber on February 21, Edge revealed his choice to challenge Reigns for the Universal Championship at WrestleMania.

Women's Royal Rumble match winner Bianca Belair spoke about her win and her championship choices. She was interrupted by Carmella's sommelier, Reginald, who claimed that Belair could not defeat SmackDown Women's Champion Sasha Banks, as she could not beat Carmella either, who then made her entrance and boasted about how she had defeated Banks in the past and that she could also defeat Belair if she chose to face Banks, who then came out and told Carmella that they were done. Banks then complimented Belair, but stated Belair was not the best as she did not have the SmackDown Women's Championship. Reginald interrupted and stated that Belair would be better off choosing to face Raw Women's Champion Asuka as she would lose to Banks, after which Belair attacked Reginald as Banks and Carmella watched on. After weeks of discussing her three options, Belair decided on the February 26 episode of SmackDown that she would challenge Banks for the SmackDown Women's Championship at WrestleMania.

== Results ==
No.	Results	Stipulations	Times
1^{P}	Nia Jax and Shayna Baszler defeated Asuka and Charlotte Flair (c) by pinfall	Tag team match for the WWE Women's Tag Team Championship	10:30
2	Drew McIntyre (c) defeated Goldberg by pinfall	Singles match for the WWE Championship	2:33
3	Sasha Banks (c) defeated Carmella (with Reginald) by submission	Singles match for the WWE SmackDown Women's Championship	10:25
4	Bianca Belair won by last eliminating Rhea Ripley	30-woman Royal Rumble match for a world championship match at WrestleMania 37	58:50
5	Roman Reigns (c) (with Paul Heyman) defeated Kevin Owens as Owens was unable to make it to his feet before the referee's count of 10	Last Man Standing match for the WWE Universal Championship	24:55
6	Edge won by last eliminating Randy Orton	30-man Royal Rumble match for a world championship match at WrestleMania 37	58:30
(c) / – the champion(s) heading into the match; P / – the match was broadcast on the pre-show

=== Women's Royal Rumble match entrances and eliminations ===
– Raw
– SmackDown
– NXT
– Hall of Famer (HOF)
– Unaffiliated
– Winner

Draw	Entrant	Brand/ Status	Order	Eliminated by	Time	Eliminations
1	Bayley	SmackDown	12	Bianca Belair	29:08	1
2	Naomi	Raw	22	Nia Jax and Shayna Baszler	47:39	0
3	Bianca Belair	SmackDown	—	Winner	56:49	4
4	Billie Kay	SmackDown	3	Ruby Riott and Liv Morgan	08:11	1
5	Shotzi Blackheart	NXT	1	Shayna Baszler	03:46	0
6	Shayna Baszler	Raw	24	Nia Jax	41:46	6
7	Toni Storm	NXT	4	Rhea Ripley	11:21	0
8	Jillian Hall	Unaffiliated	2	Billie Kay	08:03	0
9	Ruby Riott	SmackDown	7	Bayley	10:53	1
10	Victoria	Unaffiliated	5	Shayna Baszler	07:15	0
11	Peyton Royce	Raw	10	Charlotte Flair	13:40	1
12	Santana Garrett	NXT	6	Rhea Ripley	04:32	0
13	Liv Morgan	SmackDown	8	Peyton Royce	06:37	1
14	Rhea Ripley	NXT	29	Bianca Belair	39:06	7
15	Charlotte Flair	Raw	28	Rhea Ripley and Bianca Belair	33:47	1
16	Dana Brooke	Raw	9	Rhea Ripley	02:58	0
17	Torrie Wilson	HOF	11	Shayna Baszler	03:59	0
18	Lacey Evans	Raw	20	Shayna Baszler	19:21	1
19	Mickie James	Raw	14	Lacey Evans	07:20	0
20	Nikki Cross	Raw	17	Carmella	07:37	0
21	Alicia Fox (Note: During the Rumble, Alicia Fox pinned R-Truth to win the WWE 24/7 Championship, then later lost it back to Truth after being eliminated.)	Unaffiliated	13	Mandy Rose	01:48	0
22	Mandy Rose	Raw	16	Rhea Ripley	03:49	1
23	Dakota Kai	NXT	15	Rhea Ripley	02:06	0
24	Carmella	SmackDown	18	Herself	00:47	1
25	Tamina	SmackDown	23	Nia Jax and Shayna Baszler	08:31	0
26	Lana	Raw	26	Natalya	09:58	1
27	Alexa Bliss	Raw	19	Rhea Ripley	01:02	0
28	Ember Moon	NXT	21	Nia Jax	01:51	0
29	Nia Jax	Raw	25	Lana	02:44	4
30	Natalya	SmackDown	27	Bianca Belair	02:00	1

^ Bianca Belair set the longevity record for the Women's Royal Rumble, lasting 56:49. This record was previously held by Natalya who lasted 56:01 in 2019. This record would stand for two years before it was broken by Rhea Ripley and Liv Morgan, who both lasted 1:01:08 in 2023.

=== Men's Royal Rumble match entrances and eliminations ===
– Raw
– SmackDown
– NXT
– Hall of Famer (HOF)
– Unaffiliated
– Winner

Draw	Entrant	Brand/ Status	Order	Eliminated by	Time	Eliminations
1	Edge	HOF	—	Winner	1:00:02	3
2	Randy Orton	Raw	29	Edge	1:00:02	0
3	Sami Zayn	SmackDown	2	Big E	13:04	0
4	Mustafa Ali	Raw	4	Big E	13:18	1
5	Jeff Hardy	Raw	1	Dolph Ziggler	03:25	0
6	Dolph Ziggler	SmackDown	9	Kane	20:30	1
7	Shinsuke Nakamura	SmackDown	12	King Corbin	22:01	0
8	Carlito	Unaffiliated	5	Elias	08:26	0
9	Xavier Woods	Raw	3	Mustafa Ali	03:42	0
10	Big E	SmackDown	19	Omos (Note: AJ Styles' bodyguard Omos was not an entrant in the Rumble.)	29:45	4
11	John Morrison	Raw	7	Damian Priest	08:14	0
12	Ricochet	Raw	10	Kane	11:37	0
13	Elias	Raw	6	Damian Priest	02:30	1
14	Damian Priest	NXT	16	Bobby Lashley	15:34	4
15	The Miz	Raw	8	Damian Priest	01:02	0
16	Riddle	Raw	25	Seth Rollins	31:17	1
17	Daniel Bryan	SmackDown	24	Seth Rollins	28:50	1
18	Kane	Unaffiliated	11	Damian Priest	01:51	2
19	King Corbin	SmackDown	14	Dominik Mysterio	03:34	2
20	Otis	SmackDown	13	King Corbin	00:53	0
21	Dominik Mysterio	SmackDown	15	Bobby Lashley	02:00	1
22	Bobby Lashley	Raw	18	Big E, Christian, Daniel Bryan, and Riddle	04:03	3
23	Hurricane Helms	Unaffiliated	17	Big E and Bobby Lashley	00:30	0
24	Christian	Unaffiliated	26	Seth Rollins	18:12	1
25	AJ Styles	Raw	23	Braun Strowman	10:27	0
26	Rey Mysterio	SmackDown	20	Omos	03:47	0
27	Sheamus	Raw	22	Braun Strowman	05:56	0
28	Cesaro	SmackDown	21	Braun Strowman	04:10	0
29	Seth Rollins	SmackDown	28	Edge	08:48	3
30	Braun Strowman	Raw	27	Edge	07:24	3
