= List of WWE 24/7 Champions =

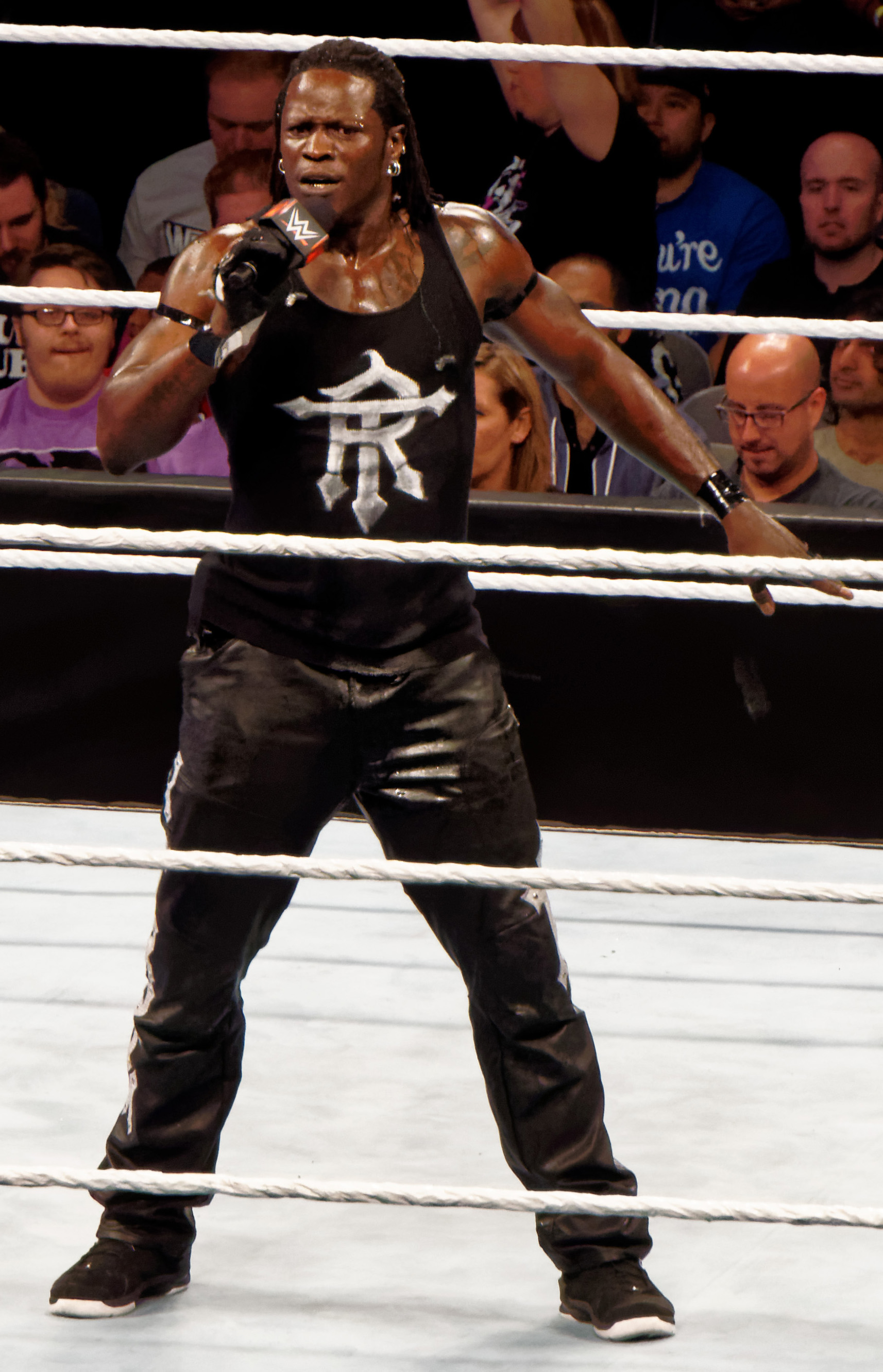
R-Truth held the championship for a record 54 reigns, which gave him the longest combined reign of 425 days (53 reigns and 415 days, respectively, as recognized by WWE)

The WWE 24/7 Championship was a professional wrestling championship created and promoted by the American professional wrestling promotion WWE. Open to anyone, regardless of gender or WWE employment status, the championship was defended "24/7", as in any time, anywhere, as long as a WWE referee was present. Because of this rule, the championship was available to all of WWE's brand divisions: their two main roster brands, Raw and SmackDown, and their developmental brand, NXT, with title changes also occurring outside of regular shows, often with videos posted on the company's website and social media accounts. The title was previously also available to the 205 Live and NXT UK brands before their closures in 2022. It was similar to the previous WWE Hardcore Championship, which also had a "24/7 rule".

The championship was introduced on the May 20, 2019, episode of Monday Night Raw, during which Titus O'Neil from Raw became the inaugural champion by securing the title belt first in a scramble involving several other wrestlers. The final champion was Nikki Cross, also from Raw. She defeated Dana Brooke for the title on the November 7, 2022 episode of Raw; afterwards backstage, she discarded the championship as trash, and WWE subsequently retired the title.

Over the championship's three-year history, there were 202 officially recognized reigns between 57 different people; there are 3 reigns that are not recognized on the official title history on WWE.com. R-Truth had the most reigns at 54 and the longest combined reign at 425 days (53 and 415 days, respectively, as recognized by WWE). Reggie's first reign was the longest singular reign at 112 days. Tucker's first reign was the shortest reign, which lasted approximately four seconds. WWE Hall of Famer Pat Patterson was the oldest champion, winning the title at 78 years old (which also made him the oldest title holder in WWE history), while Puerto Rican singer Bad Bunny was the youngest, winning the title at 26. WWE Hall of Famer "The Million Dollar Man" Ted DiBiase and R-Truth were the only title holders to become champion without winning the title; DiBiase purchased it from fellow Hall of Famer Alundra Blayze, while R-Truth 50th convinced Bad Bunny to exchange the title for some "Stone Cold" Steve Austin memorabilia. The tag team The Revival (Scott Dawson and Dash Wilder) were the only individuals to have jointly won the title, and were considered co-champions during their reign.

There were 15 non-wrestlers to win the title, including Fox sportscaster Rob Stone, then-WWE Senior Account Manager Michael Giaccio, former NFL, CFL, and USFL player Doug Flutie, WWE commentators Corey Graves and Byron Saxton, and WWE referees Daphanie LaShaunn, Eddie Orengo, and Shawn Bennett.

== Title history ==
Unless otherwise noted, the fall took place in the ring.

Key
| No. | Overall reign number |
| Reign | Reign number for the specific champion |
| Days | Number of days held |
| Days recog. | Number of days held recognized by the promotion |
| † | Championship change is unrecognized by the promotion |
| <1 | Reign lasted less than a day |

| No. | Champion | Championship change | | | Reign statistics | | | Notes | Ref. |
| No. | Champion | Date | Event | Location | Reign | Days | Days recog. | Notes | Ref. |
|---|---|---|---|---|---|---|---|---|---|
WWE: Raw and SmackDown
| 1 | Titus O'Neil | May 20, 2019 | Raw | Albany, NY | 1 | <1 | <1 | After the establishment of the championship, Mick Foley laid the belt in the ring. O'Neil became the inaugural champion by securing the belt first in a scramble that also involved Cedric Alexander, Drake Maverick, EC3, Eric Young, Karl Anderson, Luke Gallows, Mojo Rawley, and No Way Jose. | |
| 2 | Robert Roode | May 20, 2019 | Raw | Albany, NY | 1 | <1 | <1 | Took place on the entrance ramp. | |
| 3 | R-Truth | May 20, 2019 | Raw | Albany, NY | 1 | 8 | 7 | Took place in the parking lot. | |
| 4 | Elias | May 28, 2019 | SmackDown | Tulsa, OK | 1 | <1 | <1 | The 24/7 rule was temporarily suspended until after the scheduled tag team match later that same night in which Elias and R-Truth were both involved. | |
| 5 | R-Truth | May 28, 2019 | SmackDown | Tulsa, OK | 2 | 5 | 4 | Took place in the ring after the 24/7 rule's temporary suspension was lifted. | |
| 6 | Jinder Mahal | June 2, 2019 | N/A | N/A | 1 | <1 | <1 | Took place on a golf course at an undisclosed location. This title change was shown on WWE's website and social media accounts. | |
| 7 | R-Truth | June 2, 2019 | N/A | N/A | 3 | 2 | 2 | Took place on a golf course at an undisclosed location. This title change was shown on WWE's website and social media accounts. | |
| 8 | Elias | June 4, 2019 | SmackDown | Laredo, TX | 2 | <1 | <1 | This was a Lumberjack match during which the 24/7 rule was suspended. | |
| 9 | R-Truth | June 4, 2019 | SmackDown | Laredo, TX | 4 | 2 | 1 | Took place under the ring. | |
| 10 | Jinder Mahal | June 6, 2019 | N/A | Frankfurt, Germany | 2 | <1 | <1 | Took place on the tarmac during a stopover at the Frankfurt Airport on the way to Saudi Arabia. This title change was shown on WWE's website and social media accounts. | |
| 11 | R-Truth | June 6, 2019 | N/A | 39,000 feet above the Red Sea | 5 | 12 | 12 | Took place on an airplane during a flight to Saudi Arabia while Jinder Mahal was sleeping. This title change was shown on WWE's website and social media accounts. | |
| 12 | Drake Maverick | June 18, 2019 | SmackDown | Ontario, CA | 1 | 2 | 2 | Took place in the parking lot while R-Truth was trying to leave the arena where Maverick was disguised as Carmella. | |
| 13 | R-Truth | June 20, 2019 | N/A | Orlando, FL | 6 | 4 | 3 | During Drake Maverick's wedding ceremony, the pin took place in the aisle as Maverick and his wife Renee Michelle were making their exit. This title change was shown on WWE's website and social media accounts on June 21, the date WWE recognizes for the reign. | |
| 14 | Heath Slater | June 24, 2019 | Raw | Everett, WA | 1 | <1 | <1 | Took place in the ring after R-Truth, who was being chased by several other wrestlers, interrupted a scheduled match between Slater and Mojo Rawley. | |
| 15 | R-Truth | June 24, 2019 | Raw | Everett, WA | 7 | <1 | <1 | | |
| 16 | Cedric Alexander | June 24, 2019 | Raw | Everett, WA | 1 | <1 | <1 | | |
| 17 | EC3 | June 24, 2019 | Raw | Everett, WA | 1 | <1 | <1 | Took place at ringside. | |
| 18 | R-Truth | June 24, 2019 | Raw | Everett, WA | 8 | 7 | 7 | Took place on the entrance ramp after EC3 was distracted by Carmella. | |
| 19 | Drake Maverick | July 1, 2019 | Raw | Dallas, TX | 2 | 14 | 13 | Took place backstage. | |
| 20 | R-Truth | July 15, 2019 | Raw | Uniondale, NY | 9 | 7 | 6 | Took place in Drake Maverick and his wife, Renee Michelle's hotel room. R-Truth bribed a referee to dress up as a hotel worker in order for him to gain access to Maverick's room. | |
| 21 | Drake Maverick | July 22, 2019 | Raw Reunion | Tampa, FL | 3 | <1 | <1 | Took place backstage. | |
| 22 | Pat Patterson | July 22, 2019 | Raw Reunion | Tampa, FL | 1 | <1 | <1 | Took place in the locker room after Drake Maverick had tripped trying to escape The Boogeyman. | |
| 23 | Gerald Brisco | July 22, 2019 | Raw Reunion | Tampa, FL | 1 | <1 | <1 | Took place off-screen backstage. | |
| 24 | Kelly Kelly | July 22, 2019 | Raw Reunion | Tampa, FL | 1 | <1 | <1 | Took place backstage. | |
| 25 | Candice Michelle | July 22, 2019 | Raw Reunion | Tampa, FL | 1 | <1 | <1 | Took place backstage with Melina as the special guest referee. | |
| 26 | Alundra Blayze | July 22, 2019 | Raw Reunion | Tampa, FL | 1 | <1 | <1 | Took place backstage with Melina as the special guest referee. Won by submission. | |
| 27 | The Million Dollar Man | July 22, 2019 | Raw Reunion | Tampa, FL | 1 | <1 | <1 | Bought the title from Alundra Blayze, who was about to throw the belt in a trash can at the commentary table. | |
| 28 | Drake Maverick | July 22, 2019 | Raw Reunion | Tampa, FL | 4 | <1 | <1 | Took place in a limousine in the parking lot. | |
| 29 | R-Truth | July 22, 2019 | Raw Reunion | Tampa, FL | 10 | 7 | 6 | Took place in the parking lot as Drake Maverick was trying to escape in a limousine. | |
| 30 | Mike Kanellis | July 29, 2019 | Raw | Little Rock, AR | 1 | <1 | <1 | Took place in the ring when R-Truth was in a dogpile after a Mosh Pit mixed tag team match featuring Truth and Carmella against Drake Maverick and his wife, Renee Michelle, during which the 24/7 rule was suspended. | |
| 31 | Maria Kanellis | July 29, 2019 | Raw | Little Rock, AR | 1 | 7 | 6 | Forced her husband Mike Kanellis to lie down for the pin in their locker room. | |
| 32 | Mike Kanellis | August 5, 2019 | N/A | Pittsburgh, PA | 2 | <1 | <1 | Pinned his wife Maria Kanellis with a hug while she was lying on the examination table during her OB-GYN appointment where the referee was disguised as a nurse. Took place during the afternoon and shown later that night on Raw. | |
| 33 | R-Truth | August 5, 2019 | N/A | Pittsburgh, PA | 11 | 7 | 7 | Took place in the waiting room of Maria Kanellis' OB-GYN appointment where Truth was disguised as a pregnant woman. Took place during the afternoon and shown later that night on Raw. | |
| 34 | The Revival (Scott Dawson and Dash Wilder) | August 12, 2019 | Raw | Toronto, ON, Canada | 1 | <1 | <1 | Took place in the ring after R-Truth, who was being chased by several other wrestlers, interrupted a scheduled tag team match between The Revival and Lucha House Party (Lince Dorado and Gran Metalik, with Kalisto). The Revival simultaneously pinned Truth to become co-champions. | |
| 35 | R-Truth | August 12, 2019 | Raw | Toronto, ON, Canada | 12 | <1 | <1 | Took place in the ring; Carmella pulled Truth on top of Scott Dawson, who had just been attacked by Kalisto. | |
| 36 | Elias | August 12, 2019 | Raw | Toronto, ON, Canada | 3 | 11 | 11 | Took place backstage. | |
| 37 | R-Truth | August 23, 2019 | Fox Sports Founders Day | Los Angeles, CA | 13 | <1 | <1 | Took place on the stage during a musical performance by Elias. This title change was shown on WWE's website and social media accounts on August 24, the date WWE recognizes for the reign. | |
| 38 | Rob Stone | August 23, 2019 | N/A | Los Angeles, CA | 1 | <1 | <1 | Took place on the Fox College Football set. This title change was shown on WWE's website and social media accounts on August 24, the date WWE recognizes for the reign. | |
| 39 | Elias | August 23, 2019 | N/A | Los Angeles, CA | 4 | 4 | 3 | Took place on the Fox College Football set. This title change was shown on WWE's website and social media accounts on August 24, the date WWE recognizes for the reign. | |
| 40 | Drake Maverick | August 27, 2019 | SmackDown | Baton Rouge, LA | 5 | 7 | 7 | | |
| 41 | Bo Dallas | September 3, 2019 | SmackDown | Norfolk, VA | 1 | <1 | <1 | Took place backstage. | |
| 42 | Drake Maverick | September 3, 2019 | SmackDown | Norfolk, VA | 6 | <1 | <1 | | |
| 43 | R-Truth | September 3, 2019 | SmackDown | Norfolk, VA | 14 | 6 | 5 | Took place on the entrance ramp. R-Truth was disguised in the King of the Ring regalia on the stage. | |
| 44 | Enes Kanter | September 9, 2019 | Main Event | New York, NY | 1 | <1 | <1 | Took place in the ring. Recorded during a taping of Main Event prior to Raw going live on the air and shown on Raw. This was a cross promotion with NBC Sports' regional sports network that airs Boston Celtics games. | |
| 45 | R-Truth | September 9, 2019 | Main Event | New York, NY | 15 | 7 | 7 | Took place in the ring. Recorded during a taping of Main Event prior to Raw going live on the air and shown on Raw. | |
| 46 | Mayor Glenn Jacobs | September 16, 2019 | N/A | Knoxville, TN | 1 | <1 | <1 | Took place under the goal post of Neyland Stadium during a tour of Knoxville where the referee was disguised as a police officer. Jacobs is the mayor of Knox County, Tennessee, and is better known by his ring name Kane. Recorded during the afternoon and shown later that night on Raw. | |
| 47 | R-Truth | September 16, 2019 | N/A | Knoxville, TN | 16 | 4 | 3 | Took place in the valet parking area prior to Raw going live on the air and shown later that night. | |
| 48 | EC3 | September 20, 2019 | WWE Live | Quezon City, Philippines | 2 | <1 | <1 | | |
| 49 | R-Truth | September 20, 2019 | WWE Live | Quezon City, Philippines | 17 | 1 | 1 | | |
| 50 | EC3 | September 21, 2019 | WWE Live | Shanghai, China | 3 | <1 | <1 | | |
| 51 | R-Truth | September 21, 2019 | WWE Live | Shanghai, China | 18 | 1 | <1 | Chad Gable was the special guest referee. | |
| 52 | EC3 | September 22, 2019 | WWE Live | Honolulu, HI | 4 | <1 | <1 | | |
| 53 | R-Truth | September 22, 2019 | WWE Live | Honolulu, HI | 19 | 1 | 1 | Chad Gable was the special guest referee. | |
| 54 | Carmella | September 23, 2019 | Raw | San Francisco, CA | 1 | 11 | 10 | | |
| 55 | Marshmello | October 4, 2019, | SmackDown's 20th Anniversary | Los Angeles, CA | 1 | <1 | <1 | Tripped and fell on top of Carmella backstage. | |
| 56 | Carmella | October 4, 2019 | SmackDown's 20th Anniversary | Los Angeles, CA | 2 | 2 | 1 | Took place in the parking lot. This title change was shown on WWE's website and social media accounts. | |
| 57 | Tamina | October 6, 2019 | Hell in a Cell | Sacramento, CA | 1 | <1 | <1 | Took place backstage. | |
| 58 | R-Truth | October 6, 2019 | Hell in a Cell | Sacramento, CA | 20 | 15 | 15 | Took place by the international commentary tables. | |
| 59 | Sunil Singh | October 21, 2019 | Raw | Cleveland, OH | 1 | 10 | 9 | Took place backstage. | |
| 60 | R-Truth | October 31, 2019 | Crown Jewel; Kickoff | Riyadh, Saudi Arabia | 21 | <1 | <1 | Took place on the entrance ramp after both Truth and Sunil Singh were eliminated from a battle royal where the 24/7 rule was suspended. | |
| 61 | Samir Singh | October 31, 2019 | Crown Jewel | Riyadh, Saudi Arabia | 1 | 18 | 18 | Took place backstage. | |
| 62 | R-Truth | November 18, 2019 | Raw | Boston, MA | 22 | 1 | <1 | Took place backstage in the medical examination room where Truth was disguised as a doctor. This title change was shown on WWE's website and social media accounts. | |
| 63 | Michael Giaccio | November 19, 2019 | N/A | Stamford, CT | 1 | <1 | <1 | Took place during a WWE Employee Town Hall event at WWE Headquarters. Giaccio was WWE's Senior Account Manager. This title change was shown on WWE's website and social media accounts. | |
| 64 | R-Truth | November 19, 2019 | N/A | Stamford, CT | 23 | 13 | 13 | Took place during a Talent Relations meeting at WWE Headquarters. This title change was shown on WWE's website and social media accounts. | |
| 65 | Kyle Busch | December 2, 2019 | Raw | Nashville, TN | 1 | <1 | <1 | Took place at ringside with Michael Waltrip as the special guest referee. Cross promotion with NASCAR on NBC as part of the Monster Energy NASCAR Cup Series year-end award ceremony in Nashville, commemorating the 2019 NASCAR season that aired on NBCSN three days later. | |
| 66 | R-Truth | December 2, 2019 | Raw | Nashville, TN | 24 | 20 | 19 | Took place backstage. This title change was shown on WWE's website and social media accounts. | |
| 67 | Akira Tozawa | December 22, 2019 | N/A | New York, NY | 1 | <1 | <1 | Took place at the Rockefeller Center in front of the Rockefeller Center Christmas Tree. This title change was shown on the December 23 episode of Raw. | |
| 68 | Santa Claus | December 22, 2019 | N/A | New York, NY | 1 | <1 | <1 | Took place at Columbus Circle. This title change was shown on the December 23 episode of Raw. Santa Claus was played by independent wrestler Bear Bronson. | |
| 69 | R-Truth | December 22, 2019 | N/A | New York, NY | 25 | 4 | 4 | Took place in front of the Lincoln Center. This title change was shown on the December 23 episode of Raw. | |
| 70 | Samir Singh | December 26, 2019 | WWE Live | New York, NY | 2 | <1 | <1 | This was a handicap match also involving Sunil Singh. | |
| 71 | Sunil Singh | December 26, 2019 | WWE Live | New York, NY | 2 | <1 | <1 | | |
| 72 | R-Truth | December 26, 2019 | WWE Live | New York, NY | 26 | 1 | <1 | | |
| 73 | Samir Singh | December 27, 2019 | WWE Live | Pittsburgh, PA | 3 | <1 | <1 | This was a handicap match also involving Sunil Singh. | |
| 74 | Mike Rome | December 27, 2019 | WWE Live | Pittsburgh, PA | 1 | <1 | <1 | | |
| 75 | Sunil Singh | December 27, 2019 | WWE Live | Pittsburgh, PA | 3 | <1 | <1 | | |
| 76 | R-Truth | December 27, 2019 | WWE Live | Pittsburgh, PA | 27 | 1 | <1 | | |
| 77 | Samir Singh | December 28, 2019 | WWE Live | Baltimore, MD | 4 | <1 | <1 | This was a handicap match also involving Sunil Singh. | |
| 78 | R-Truth | December 28, 2019 | WWE Live | Baltimore, MD | 28 | 1 | <1 | | |
| 79 | Samir Singh | December 29, 2019 | WWE Live | Hershey, PA | 5 | <1 | <1 | This was a handicap match also involving Sunil Singh. WWE.com mistakenly has Samir and Sunil's wins reversed on this date. | |
| 80 | Sunil Singh | December 29, 2019 | WWE Live | Hershey, PA | 4 | <1 | <1 | WWE.com mistakenly has Sunil and Samir's wins reversed on this date. | |
| 81 | R-Truth | December 29, 2019 | WWE Live | Hershey, PA | 29 | 2 | 2 | | |
| 82 | Mojo Rawley | December 31, 2019 | Fox's New Year's Eve with Steve Harvey | New York, NY | 1 | <1 | <1 | Took place in Times Square. Co-host Maria Menounos was the special guest referee. | |
| 83 | R-Truth | December 31, 2019 | Fox's New Year's Eve with Steve Harvey | New York, NY | 30 | 13 | 12 | Took place in Times Square. Co-host Maria Menounos was the special guest referee. | |
| 84 | Mojo Rawley | January 13, 2020 | Raw | Lexington, KY | 2 | 4 | 3 | Took place on the entrance ramp. | |
| 85 | R-Truth | January 17, 2020 | WWE Live | Lafayette, LA | 31 | <1 | <1 | | |
| 86 | Mojo Rawley | January 17, 2020 | WWE Live | Lafayette, LA | 3 | 1 | <1 | | |
| 87 | R-Truth | January 18, 2020 | WWE Live | Jackson, MS | 32 | <1 | <1 | | |
| 88 | Mojo Rawley | January 18, 2020 | WWE Live | Jackson, MS | 4 | 1 | <1 | | |
| 89 | R-Truth | January 19, 2020 | WWE Live | Topeka, KS | 33 | <1 | <1 | | |
| 90 | Mojo Rawley | January 19, 2020 | WWE Live | Topeka, KS | 5 | 8 | 8 | | |
| 91 | R-Truth | January 27, 2020 | Raw | San Antonio, TX | 34 | <1 | <1 | | |
| 92 | Mojo Rawley | January 27, 2020 | Raw | San Antonio, TX | 6 | 14 | 13 | | |
| 93 | Riddick Moss | February 10, 2020 | Raw | Ontario, CA | 1 | 41 | 40 | | |
| 94 | R-Truth | March 22, 2020 | N/A | Orlando, FL | 35 | 4 or 3 | 13 | Took place on a sidewalk while Riddick Moss was jogging. This title change was shown on WWE's website and social media accounts. WWE recognizes this reign as ending on April 4, when the following title change aired on tape delay. | |
| 95 | Mojo Rawley | March 25 or 26, 2020 | WrestleMania 36; Part 1 | Orlando, FL | 7 | <1 or 1 | <1 | Took place in the host's viewing area. WrestleMania was taped on March 25 and 26, but it is unknown which day this title change was taped. WWE recognizes this reign as beginning on April 4 and ending on April 5, when the title changes aired on tape delay. | |
| 96 | Rob Gronkowski | March 25 or 26, 2020 | WrestleMania 36; Part 2 | Orlando, FL | 1 | 68 or 67 | 57 | Took place in the host's viewing area. WrestleMania was taped on March 25 and 26, but it is unknown which day this title change was taped. WWE recognizes this reign as beginning on April 5, when the title change aired on tape delay. National Football League player Gronkowski was serving as the host of the event. | |
| 97 | R-Truth | June 1, 2020 | N/A | Foxborough, MA | 36 | 16 | 21 | Took place in Rob Gronkowski's backyard. Recorded during the afternoon and shown later that night on Raw. WWE recognizes this reign as ending on June 22, when the title change aired on tape delay. | |
| 98 | Akira Tozawa | June 17, 2020 | Raw | Orlando, FL | 2 | 10 | 6 | R-Truth was originally scheduled to defend the title against Tozawa in a singles match, but Truth was attacked by Bobby Lashley, after which, Tozawa pinned Truth. WWE recognizes this reign as beginning on June 22 and ending on June 29, when the title changes aired on tape delay. | |
| 99 | R-Truth | June 27, 2020 | Raw | Orlando, FL | 37 | 23 | 20 | This was a singles match during which the 24/7 rule was suspended. WWE recognizes this reign as beginning on June 29, when the title change aired on tape delay. | |
| 100 | Shelton Benjamin | July 20, 2020 | Raw | Orlando, FL | 1 | 14 | 14 | Took place backstage. | |
| 101 | Akira Tozawa | August 3, 2020 | Raw | Orlando, FL | 3 | <1 | 7 | This was a triple threat match during which the 24/7 rule was suspended also involving R-Truth, who Tozawa pinned. WWE recognizes this reign as ending on August 10, when the title change aired on tape delay. | |
| 102 | R-Truth | August 3, 2020 | Raw | Orlando, FL | 38 | 10 | 6 | Took place on the entrance ramp. WWE recognizes this reign as beginning on August 10 and ending on August 17, when the title changes aired on tape delay. | |
| 103 | Shelton Benjamin | August 13, 2020 | Raw | Orlando, FL | 2 | <1 | <1 | Took place at ringside. WWE recognizes the date for this reign as August 17, when the title change aired on tape delay. | |
| 104 | Cedric Alexander | August 13, 2020 | Raw | Orlando, FL | 2 | <1 | <1 | Took place at ringside. WWE recognizes the date for this reign as August 17, when the title change aired on tape delay. | |
| 105 | Shelton Benjamin | August 13, 2020 | Raw | Orlando, FL | 3 | 11 | 6 | WWE recognizes this reign as beginning on August 17, when the title change aired on tape delay. | |
| 106 | Akira Tozawa | August 24, 2020 | Raw | Orlando, FL | 4 | 7 | 7 | This was a fatal four-way match, during which the 24/7 rule was suspended, also involving Cedric Alexander and R-Truth, who Tozawa pinned. | |
| 107 | R-Truth | August 31, 2020 | N/A | Orlando, FL | 39 | 27 | 26 | Took place in the parking garage where the referee was disguised as the parking garage attendant. Recorded during the afternoon and shown later that night on Raw. | |
| 108 | Drew Gulak | September 27, 2020 | Clash of Champions | Orlando, FL | 1 | <1 | <1 | Took place backstage. | |
| 109 | R-Truth | September 27, 2020 | Clash of Champions | Orlando, FL | 40 | 1 | 1 | Took place backstage in the interview area. | |
| 110 | Akira Tozawa | September 28, 2020 | Raw | Orlando, FL | 5 | <1 | <1 | Took place backstage. | |
| 111 | Drew Gulak | September 28, 2020 | Raw | Orlando, FL | 2 | <1 | <1 | Took place backstage. | |
| 112 | R-Truth | September 28, 2020 | Raw | Orlando, FL | 41 | 7 | 7 | Took place backstage. | |
| 113 | Drew Gulak | October 5, 2020 | Raw | Orlando, FL | 3 | <1 | <1 | Took place backstage. | |
| 114 | R-Truth | October 5, 2020 | Raw | Orlando, FL | 42 | 28 | 28 | Took place in a dumpster backstage. | |
| 115 | Drew Gulak | November 2, 2020 | Raw | Orlando, FL | 4 | 7 | 6 | Took place in the ring after Bobby Lashley defeated R-Truth in a non-title match; Gulak came out and attempted to pin Truth but Lashley attacked Gulak and laid his unconscious body on Truth, allowing him to get the pinfall. | |
| 116 | R-Truth | November 9, 2020 | Raw | Orlando, FL | 43 | <1 | <1 | Took place backstage. | |
| 117 | Akira Tozawa | November 9, 2020 | Raw | Orlando, FL | 6 | <1 | <1 | This was a seven-way match also involving Drew Gulak, Erik, Gran Metalik, Lince Dorado, and Tucker, during which the 24/7 rule was suspended. | |
| 118 | Erik | November 9, 2020 | Raw | Orlando, FL | 1 | <1 | <1 | | |
| 119 | Drew Gulak | November 9, 2020 | Raw | Orlando, FL | 5 | <1 | <1 | Took place ringside. | |
| 120 | Tucker | November 9, 2020 | Raw | Orlando, FL | 1 | <1 | <1 | | |
| 121 | Drew Gulak | November 9, 2020 | Raw | Orlando, FL | 6 | <1 | <1 | | |
| 122 | Tucker | November 9, 2020 | Raw | Orlando, FL | 2 | <1 | <1 | | |
| 123 | Gran Metalik | November 9, 2020 | Raw | Orlando, FL | 1 | <1 | <1 | | |
| 124 | Lince Dorado | November 9, 2020 | Raw | Orlando, FL | 1 | <1 | <1 | | |
| 125 | R-Truth | November 9, 2020 | Raw | Orlando, FL | 44 | 13 | 12 | | |
| 126 | The Gobbledy Gooker | November 22, 2020 | Survivor Series; Kickoff | Orlando, FL | 1 (7) | <1 | <1 | Took place by the panelist table. The character was portrayed by Drew Gulak, however, WWE did not acknowledge this and thus does not recognize this as Gulak's seventh reign. | |
| 127 | Akira Tozawa | November 22, 2020 | Survivor Series | Orlando, FL | 7 | <1 | <1 | Took place backstage. | |
| 128 | R-Truth | November 22, 2020 | Survivor Series | Orlando, FL | 45 | 39 | 39 | Took place backstage. | |
| 129 | Angel Garza | December 31, 2020 | TikTok's New Year's Eve Party | N/A | 1 | 4 | 4 | Took place during a party at an undisclosed location that was streamed live on TikTok. | |
| 130 | R-Truth | January 4, 2021 | Raw Legends Night | St. Petersburg, FL | 46 | 27 | 28 | Took place backstage after Angel Garza was scared by The Boogeyman. | |
| 131 | Alicia Fox | January 31, 2021 | Royal Rumble | St. Petersburg, FL | 1 | <1 | <1 | Took place during the women's Royal Rumble match, in which Fox was participating. | |
| 132 | R-Truth | January 31, 2021 | Royal Rumble | St. Petersburg, FL | 47 | <1 | <1 | Took place ringside after Fox was eliminated from the women's Royal Rumble match. | |
| 133 | Peter Rosenberg | January 31, 2021 | Royal Rumble | St. Petersburg, FL | 1 | 1 | 1 | Took place by the panelist table. Radio personality Rosenberg had served as a panelist during the Royal Rumble Kickoff pre-show. | |
| 134 | R-Truth | February 1, 2021 | The Michael Kay Show | St. Petersburg, FL | 48 | 5 | 5 | Pinned Peter Rosenberg in Rosenberg's hotel room during the live remote broadcast, which aired on the YES Network and WEPN Radio. | |
| 135 | Doug Flutie | February 6, 2021 | 2021 Celebrity Flag Football Game | Clearwater, FL | 1 | <1 | <1 | Took place at Clearwater Beach during halftime of the game, which aired on ESPNEWS. | |
| 136 | R-Truth | February 6, 2021 | 2021 Celebrity Flag Football Game | Clearwater, FL | 49 | 9 | 9 | Took place at Clearwater Beach during the game, which aired on ESPNEWS. | |
| 137 | Akira Tozawa | February 15, 2021 | Raw | St. Petersburg, FL | 8 | <1 | <1 | Took place backstage. | |
| 138 | Bad Bunny | February 15, 2021 | Raw | St. Petersburg, FL | 1 | 28 | 28 | Took place backstage. | |
| 139 | R-Truth | March 15, 2021 | Raw | St. Petersburg, FL | 50 | 6 | 6 | Bad Bunny relinquished the title to R-Truth in exchange for "Stone Cold" Steve Austin memorabilia. | |
| 140 | Joseph Average | March 21, 2021 | Fastlane | St. Petersburg, FL | 1 | <1 | <1 | Took place backstage during an Old Spice advertisement. The character was an Old Spice representative who was played by NXT and WWE Performance Center trainee Rik Bugez. | |
| 141 | R-Truth | March 21, 2021 | Fastlane | St. Petersburg, FL | 51 | 29 | 57 | Took place backstage during an Old Spice advertisement. WWE incorrectly lists that R-Truth's reign ended on May 17, 2021 as the official title history does not reflect the next three title changes. | |
| † | Akira Tozawa | April 19, 2021 (air date) | N/A | St. Petersburg, FL | 9 | <1 | — | Took place in the backstage area of Tropicana Field. This title change was shown on WWE's YouTube channel. The actual date the title change took place is unknown. WWE's official title history does not reflect this title change. | |
| † | Joseph Average | April 19, 2021 (air date) | N/A | St. Petersburg, FL | 2 | <1 | — | Took place in the backstage area of Tropicana Field. This title change was shown on WWE's YouTube channel. The actual date the title change took place is unknown. WWE's official title history does not reflect this title change. | |
| † | R-Truth | April 19, 2021 (air date) | N/A | St. Petersburg, FL | 52 | 28 | — | Took place in the backstage area of Tropicana Field. This title change was shown on WWE's YouTube channel. The actual date the title change took place is unknown. WWE's official title history does not reflect this title change, although the match description for the following title change says that Akira Tozawa ended Truth's 52nd reign. | |
| 142^{(145)} | Akira Tozawa | May 17, 2021 | Raw | Tampa, FL | 9^{(10)} | 42 | 41 | Took place backstage in a stairwell. WWE's official title history incorrectly shows that this is Tozawa's ninth reign as the previous three title changes have not been added to the official title history, although the match description says that Tozawa ended R-Truth's 52nd reign. | |
| 143^{(146)} | Drew Gulak | June 28, 2021 | Raw | Tampa, FL | 7^{(8)} | <1 | <1 | Took place at ringside after Akira Tozawa was eliminated from a battle royal. | |
| 144^{(147)} | R-Truth | June 28, 2021 | Raw | Tampa, FL | 52^{(53)} | <1 | <1 | Took place at ringside after Drew Gulak was eliminated from a battle royal. | |
| 145^{(148)} | Akira Tozawa | June 28, 2021 | Raw | Tampa, FL | 10^{(11)} | 21 | 21 | Took place at ringside after R-Truth was eliminated from a battle royal. | |
| 146^{(149)} | Reginald/Reggie | July 19, 2021 | Raw | Dallas, TX | 1 | 112 | 112 | On July 30, 2021, his ring name was shortened to Reggie. | |
| 147^{(150)} | Drake Maverick | November 8, 2021 | Raw | Louisville, KY | 7 | <1 | <1 | | |
| 148^{(151)} | Akira Tozawa | November 8, 2021 | Raw | Louisville, KY | 11^{(12)} | <1 | <1 | | |
| 149^{(152)} | Corey Graves | November 8, 2021 | Raw | Louisville, KY | 1 | <1 | <1 | Took place ringside. | |
| 150^{(153)} | Byron Saxton | November 8, 2021 | Raw | Louisville, KY | 1 | <1 | <1 | Took place ringside. | |
| 151^{(154)} | Drake Maverick | November 8, 2021 | Raw | Louisville, KY | 8 | <1 | <1 | Took place ringside. | |
| 152^{(155)} | Reggie | November 8, 2021 | Raw | Louisville, KY | 2 | 14 | 14 | | |
| 153^{(156)} | Cedric Alexander | November 22, 2021 | Raw | Brooklyn, NY | 3 | <1 | <1 | | |
| 154^{(157)} | Dana Brooke | November 22, 2021 | Raw | Brooklyn, NY | 1 | 84 | 84 | | |
| 155^{(158)} | Reggie | February 14, 2022 | Raw | Indianapolis, IN | 3 | 7 | 6 | Took place in a restaurant. | |
| 156^{(159)} | Dana Brooke | February 21, 2022 | Raw | Columbia, SC | 2 | 56 | 55 | | |
| 157^{(160)} | Reggie | April 18, 2022 | Raw | Buffalo, NY | 4 | <1 | <1 | Took place during an in-ring wedding ceremony. | |
| 158^{(161)} | Tamina | April 18, 2022 | Raw | Buffalo, NY | 2 | <1 | <1 | Took place during an in-ring wedding ceremony. | |
| 159^{(162)} | Akira Tozawa | April 18, 2022 | Raw | Buffalo, NY | 12^{(13)} | <1 | <1 | Took place during an in-ring wedding ceremony. | |
| 160^{(163)} | Dana Brooke | April 18, 2022 | Raw | Buffalo, NY | 3 | 14 | 14 | Took place during an in-ring wedding ceremony. | |
| 161^{(164)} | Nikki A.S.H. | May 2, 2022 | Raw | Greensboro, NC | 1 | <1 | <1 | Took place backstage. | |
| 162^{(165)} | Dana Brooke | May 2, 2022 | Raw | Greensboro, NC | 4 | 28 | 28 | This was a singles match, during which the 24/7 rule was suspended. | |
| 163^{(166)} | Tamina | May 30, 2022 | Raw | Des Moines, IA | 3 | <1 | <1 | Took place during MizTV. | |
| 164^{(167)} | Akira Tozawa | May 30, 2022 | Raw | Des Moines, IA | 13^{(14)} | 7 | 7 | Took place during MizTV. | |
| 165^{(168)} | Dana Brooke | June 6, 2022 | Raw | Green Bay, WI | 5 | 14 | 17 | Took place during Brooke's match against Becky Lynch. WWE recognizes this reign as ending on June 23, when the following title change aired on tape delay. | |
| 166^{(169)} | Doudrop | June 20, 2022 | Main Event | Lincoln, NE | 1 | <1 | <1 | Aired on tape delay on June 23, 2022. | |
| 167^{(170)} | Akira Tozawa | June 20, 2022 | Main Event | Lincoln, NE | 14^{(15)} | <1 | <1 | Aired on tape delay on June 23, 2022. | |
| 168^{(171)} | R-Truth | June 20, 2022 | Main Event | Lincoln, NE | 53^{(54)} | <1 | <1 | Aired on tape delay on June 23, 2022. | |
| 169^{(172)} | Nikki A.S.H. | June 20, 2022 | Main Event | Lincoln, NE | 2 | <1 | <1 | Took place ringside. Aired on tape delay on June 23, 2022. | |
| 170^{(173)} | Dana Brooke | June 20, 2022 | Main Event | Lincoln, NE | 6 | 19 | 16 | WWE recognizes this reign as beginning on June 23, when the title change aired on tape delay. | |
| 171^{(174)} | Carmella | July 9, 2022 | WWE Live | Bossier City, LA | 3 | <1 | <1 | | |
| 172^{(175)} | Dana Brooke | July 9, 2022 | WWE Live | Bossier City, LA | 7 | 1 | 1 | | |
| 173^{(176)} | Carmella | July 10, 2022 | WWE Live | Waco, TX | 4 | <1 | <1 | | |
| 174^{(177)} | Dana Brooke | July 10, 2022 | WWE Live | Waco, TX | 8 | 8 | 8 | | |
| 175^{(178)} | Akira Tozawa | July 18, 2022 | Raw | Tampa, FL | 15^{(16)} | <1 | <1 | Took place ringside during a six-woman tag team match. | |
| 176^{(179)} | Nikki A.S.H. | July 18, 2022 | Raw | Tampa, FL | 3 | <1 | <1 | Took place during a six-woman tag team match. | |
| 177^{(180)} | Alexa Bliss | July 18, 2022 | Raw | Tampa, FL | 1 | <1 | <1 | Took place during a six-woman tag team match. | |
| 178^{(181)} | Doudrop | July 18, 2022 | Raw | Tampa, FL | 2 | <1 | <1 | Took place during a six-woman tag team match. | |
| 179^{(182)} | Tamina | July 18, 2022 | Raw | Tampa, FL | 4 | <1 | <1 | Took place during a six-woman tag team match. | |
| 180^{(183)} | Dana Brooke | July 18, 2022 | Raw | Tampa, FL | 9 | 33 | 32 | Took place during a six-woman tag team match. | |
| 181^{(184)} | Nikki A.S.H. | August 20, 2022 | WWE Live | Kingston, ON, Canada | 4 | <1 | <1 | | |
| 182^{(185)} | Tamina | August 20, 2022 | WWE Live | Kingston, ON, Canada | 5 | <1 | <1 | | |
| 183^{(186)} | Dana Brooke | August 20, 2022 | WWE Live | Kingston, ON, Canada | 10 | 1 | 1 | | |
| 184^{(187)} | Nikki A.S.H. | August 21, 2022 | WWE Live | London, ON, Canada | 5 | <1 | <1 | | |
| 185^{(188)} | Shawn Bennett | August 21, 2022 | WWE Live | London, ON, Canada | 1 | <1 | <1 | Bennett was a WWE referee. | |
| 186^{(189)} | Tamina | August 21, 2022 | WWE Live | London, ON, Canada | 6 | <1 | <1 | | |
| 187^{(190)} | Dana Brooke | August 21, 2022 | WWE Live | London, ON, Canada | 11 | 20 | 20 | | |
| 188^{(191)} | Nikki A.S.H. | September 10, 2022 | WWE Live | Colorado Springs, CO | 6 | <1 | <1 | | |
| 189^{(192)} | Eddie Orengo | September 10, 2022 | WWE Live | Colorado Springs, CO | 1 | <1 | <1 | Orengo was a WWE referee. | |
| 190^{(193)} | Tamina | September 10, 2022 | WWE Live | Colorado Springs, CO | 7 | <1 | <1 | | |
| 191^{(194)} | Dana Brooke | September 10, 2022 | WWE Live | Colorado Springs, CO | 12 | 14 | 13 | | |
| 192^{(195)} | Nikki A.S.H. | September 24, 2022 | WWE Live | Vancouver, BC, Canada | 7 | <1 | <1 | | |
| 193^{(196)} | Daphanie LaShaunn | September 24, 2022 | WWE Live | Vancouver, BC, Canada | 1 | <1 | <1 | LaShaunn was a WWE referee. | |
| 194^{(197)} | Nikki A.S.H. | September 24, 2022 | WWE Live | Vancouver, BC, Canada | 8 | <1 | <1 | | |
| 195^{(198)} | Dana Brooke | September 24, 2022 | WWE Live | Vancouver, BC, Canada | 13 | 35 | 35 | | |
| 196^{(199)} | Nikki Cross | October 29, 2022 | WWE Live | Monterrey, NL, Mexico | 9 | <1 | <1 | Cross was previously known as Nikki A.S.H. | |
| 197^{(200)} | Tamina | October 29, 2022 | WWE Live | Monterrey, NL, Mexico | 8 | <1 | <1 | | |
| 198^{(201)} | Dana Brooke | October 29, 2022 | WWE Live | Monterrey, NL, Mexico | 14 | 1 | 1 | | |
| 199^{(202)} | Nikki Cross | October 30, 2022 | WWE Live | Mexico City, Mexico | 10 | <1 | <1 | | |
| 200^{(203)} | Tamina | October 30, 2022 | WWE Live | Mexico City, Mexico | 9 | <1 | <1 | | |
| 201^{(204)} | Dana Brooke | October 30, 2022 | WWE Live | Mexico City, Mexico | 15 | 8 | 8 | | |
| 202^{(205)} | Nikki Cross | November 7, 2022 | Raw | Wilkes-Barre, PA | 11 | <1 | <1 | | |
| — | Deactivated | November 9, 2022 | – | – | — | — | — | During a backstage segment on the November 7, 2022, episode of Raw, Nikki Cross discarded the belt as trash, deactivating the title. | |

== Combined reigns ==
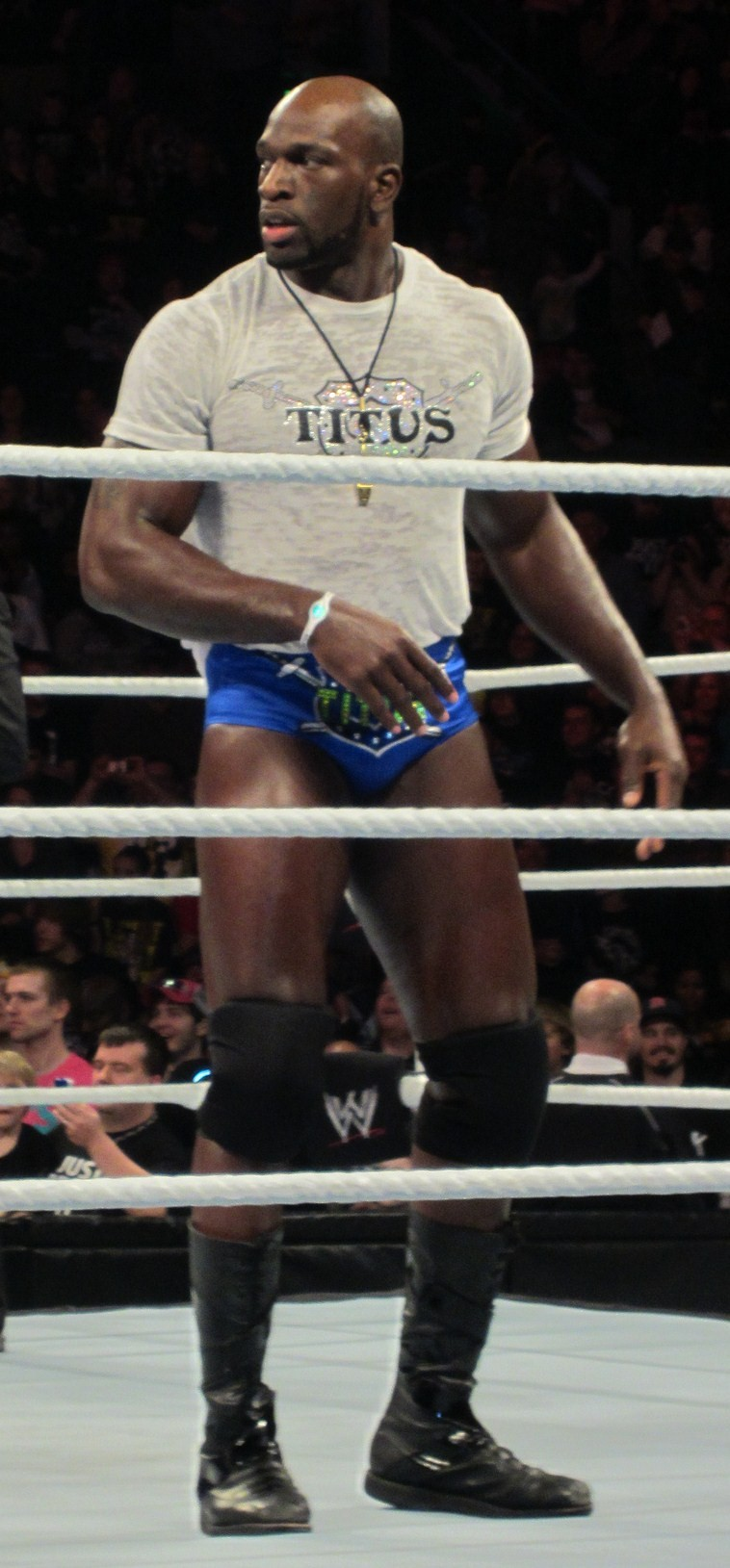
Inaugural champion Titus O'Neil.

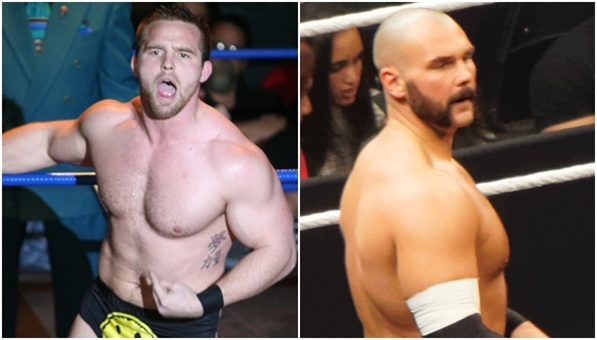
The Revival (Scott Dawson and Dash Wilder) were the only tag team to win the title and officially be recognized as co-champions.

| ¤ | The exact length of at least one title reign is uncertain, so the shortest length is considered. |

| Rank | Wrestler | No. of reigns | Combined days | Combined days rec. by WWE |
|---|---|---|---|---|
| 1 | R-Truth | 53^{(54)} (Note: WWE recognizes R-Truth as a 53-time champion. His 52nd reign is not recognized by WWE.) | ¤423 | ¤415 |
| 2 | Dana Brooke | 15 | 336 | 335 |
| 3 | Reginald/Reggie | 4 | 133 | 132 |
| 4 | Akira Tozawa | 15^{(16)} (Note: WWE recognizes Akira Tozawa as a 15-time champion. His ninth reign is not recognized by WWE.) | 87 | 89 |
| 5 | Rob Gronkowski | 1 | ¤67 | 57 |
| 6 | Riddick Moss | 1 | 41 | 40 |
| 7 | Mojo Rawley | 7 | ¤28 | 25 |
| 7 | Bad Bunny | 1 | 28 | |
| 9 | Shelton Benjamin | 3 | 25 | 20 |
| 10 | Drake Maverick | 8 | 23 | 22 |
| 11 | Samir Singh | 5 | 18 | |
| 12 | Elias | 4 | 15 | 14 |
| 13 | Carmella | 4 | 13 | 11 |
| 14 | Sunil Singh | 4 | 10 | 9 |
| 15 | Drew Gulak | 7 | 7 | 6 |
| 15 | Maria Kanellis | 1 | 7 | 6 |
| 17 | Angel Garza | 1 | 4 | |
| 18 | Peter Rosenberg | 1 | 1 | <1 |
| 19 | Nikki A.S.H./Nikki Cross | 11 | <1 | |
| 19 | Tamina | 9 | <1 | |
| 19 | EC3 | 4 | <1 | |
| 19 | Cedric Alexander | 3 | <1 | |
| 19 | Doudrop | 2 | <1 | |
| 19 | Jinder Mahal | 2 | <1 | |
| 19 | Mike Kanellis | 2 | <1 | |
| 19 | Tucker | 2 | <1 | |
| 19 | Joseph Average | 1^{(2)} (Note: WWE recognizes Joseph Average as a one-time champion. His second reign is not recognized by WWE.) | <1 | |
| 19 | Alexa Bliss | 1 | <1 | |
| 19 | Alicia Fox | 1 | <1 | |
| 19 | Alundra Blayze | 1 | <1 | |
| 19 | Bo Dallas | 1 | <1 | |
| 19 | Byron Saxton | 1 | <1 | |
| 19 | Candice Michelle | 1 | <1 | |
| 19 | Corey Graves | 1 | <1 | |
| 19 | Daphanie LaShaunn | 1 | <1 | |
| 19 | Doug Flutie | 1 | <1 | |
| 19 | Eddie Orengo | 1 | <1 | |
| 19 | Enes Kanter | 1 | <1 | |
| 19 | Erik | 1 | <1 | |
| 19 | Gerald Brisco | 1 | <1 | |
| 19 | Mayor Glenn Jacobs | 1 | <1 | |
| 19 | Gran Metalik | 1 | <1 | |
| 19 | Heath Slater | 1 | <1 | |
| 19 | Kelly Kelly | 1 | <1 | |
| 19 | Kyle Busch | 1 | <1 | |
| 19 | Lince Dorado | 1 | <1 | |
| 19 | Marshmello | 1 | <1 | |
| 19 | Michael Giaccio | 1 | <1 | |
| 19 | Mike Rome | 1 | <1 | |
| 19 | Pat Patterson | 1 | <1 | |
| 19 | Robert Roode | 1 | <1 | |
| 19 | Rob Stone | 1 | <1 | |
| 19 | Santa Claus (Note: Santa Claus was portrayed by Bear Bronson.) | 1 | <1 | |
| 19 | Shawn Bennett | 1 | <1 | |
| 19 | The Gobbledy Gooker (Note: During the Survivor Series Kickoff pre-show on November 22, 2020, Drew Gulak portrayed The Gobbledy Gooker, who won the 24/7 Championship; however, WWE does not recognize this as Gulak's seventh reign and instead recognize it as a sole reign for The Gobbledy Gooker character.) | 1 | <1 | |
| 19 | The Million Dollar Man | 1 | <1 | |
| 19 | The Revival (Scott Dawson and Dash Wilder) | 1 | <1 | |
| 19 | Titus O'Neil | 1 | <1 | |

== See also ==
- Ironman Heavymetalweight Championship – a title with a similar 24/7 rule
