= Mojo Rawley =

American-Palestinian professional wrestler (born 1986)

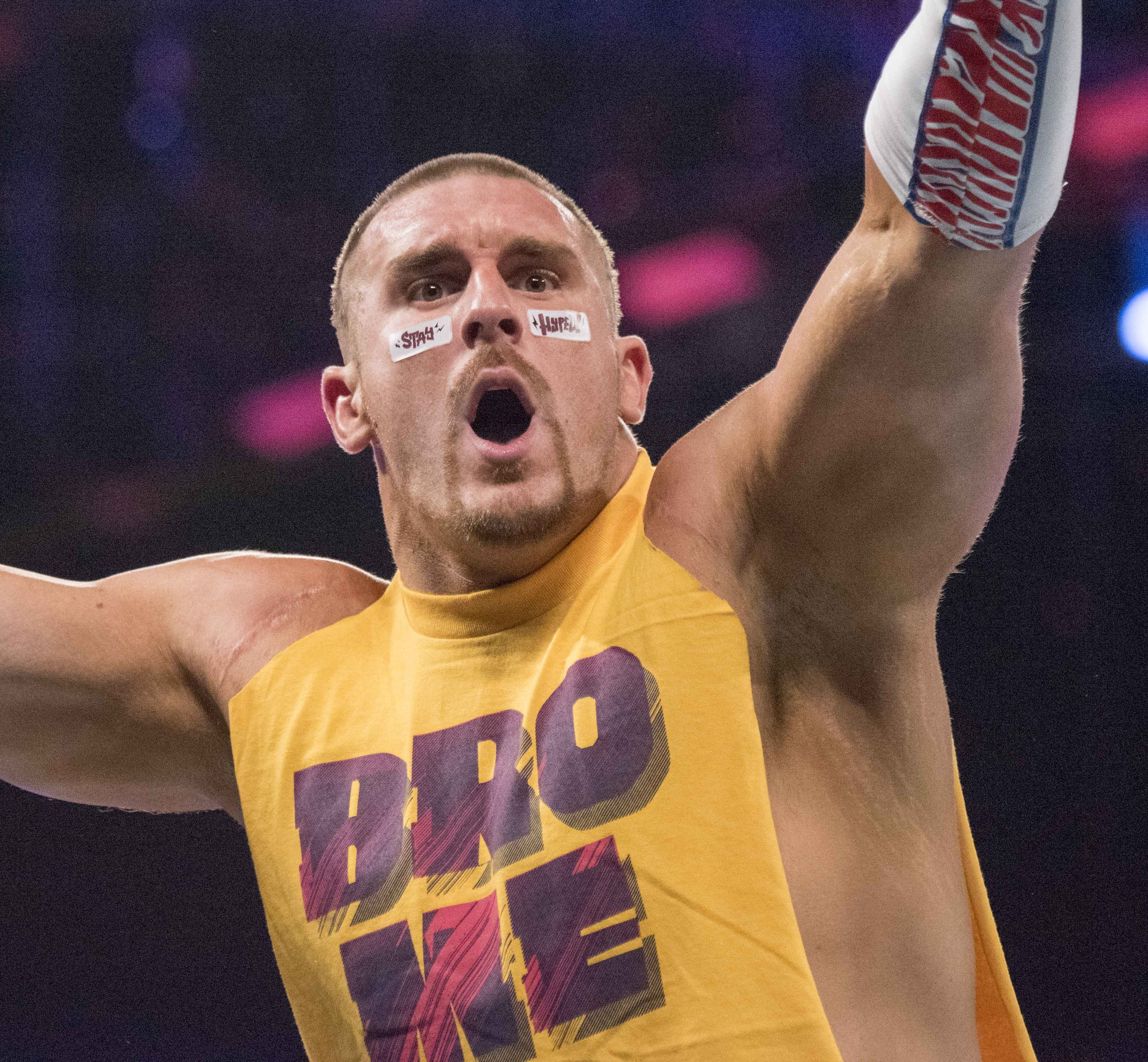
- Rawley in 2016
- Born: Dean Muhtadi; July 17, 1986 (age 40); Alexandria, Virginia, U.S.
- Education: University of Maryland
- Spouse: Grace Muhtadi (m. 2022)
- Children: 1
- Professional wrestling career
- Ring name(s): Dean Muhtadi; Mojo Muhtadi; Mojo Rawley
- Billed height: 6 ft 4 in (193 cm)
- Billed weight: 265 lb (120 kg)
- Billed from: Alexandria, Virginia
- Trained by: WWE Performance Center
- Debut: May 29, 2013
- Football career

No. 64
- Position: Defensive lineman

Personal information
- Listed height: 6 ft 3 in (1.91 m)
- Listed weight: 296 lb (134 kg)

Career information
- College: Maryland
- NFL draft: 2009: undrafted

Career history
- Green Bay Packers (2009)*; Arizona Cardinals (2010)*
- * Offseason or practice squad member only

Dean Muhtadi (Arabic: دين مُهتدي; born July 17, 1986) is an American professional wrestler, businessman, television presenter, talk show host and former football player. He is best known for his tenure in WWE, where he performed under the ring name Mojo Rawley. During his tenure with WWE, he was a seven-time WWE 24/7 Champion and the winner of the 2017 edition of the André the Giant Memorial Battle Royal.

== Early life and education ==
Dean Muhtadi was born on July 17, 1986, in Alexandria, Virginia, the son of Talal "TJ" Muhtadi and Maria Muhtadi-Roach. Muhtadi is of predominantly Middle Eastern descent as his father is Palestinian and his mother is half-Syrian, and has extended family through his father's side in Palestine, Jordan, Saudi Arabia, and throughout the Middle East.

While in the seventh grade, Muhtadi began working for the financial services firm Morgan Stanley as an intern. After graduating from high school, Muhtadi continued to work for Morgan Stanley. He attended Christopher Newport University on a full academic scholarship. At Christopher Newport, Muhtadi was named the top student-athlete on the team, he was a two-time All USA South Athletic Conference All-Academic Selection, a member of the President's Leadership Program, Honors Program, and Student Executive Board of the Business School. He also received the Edith McMurran Honors Scholarship for the student who best demonstrates the balance of leadership, public service, and academic excellence.

He then transferred to the University of Maryland and spent the next three years there, where he became one of the top student-athletes in the Atlantic Coast Conference. In 2008, Muhtadi won the Jim and Pat Thacker Postgraduate Scholarship for being one of the top student-athletes in the ACC for all sports and all schools. In 2007 and 2008, Muhtadi also received the George Boutselis Memorial Award for being the letterman with the highest academic average on the football team. He also was named to the All-ACC Academic Team in 2008 and was a three-time Dean's List student. Muhtadi received his MBA from the Smith Business School MBA Program.

== Football career ==
=== Early years ===
At the T. C. Williams High School in Alexandria, Virginia, Muhtadi was a four-year starter along the defensive and offensive lines. He also was the team's punter during his last two years. He finished second in the Patriot District in sacks in 2004, and broke the school's all-time punting record with a long of 76 yards against West Springfield High School.

Throughout his high school playing career, Muhtadi started games at defensive tackle, end, nose guard, and outside linebacker on defense, and at offensive tackle, guard, center, and tight end on offense. He was also the team's punter and kicker. Often his position changed every week to shadow the opposing team's best player. Muhtadi was an All-District choice at both defensive line and punter, as well as the team MVP.

=== College ===
In 2004 and 2005, Muhtadi played college football for Division III Christopher Newport University in Newport News, Virginia. After redshirting his freshman season due to mononucleosis, Muhtadi started at defensive tackle for the Captains his sophomore year. He then transferred to the University of Maryland in the Atlantic Coast Conference where he earned a scholarship, and a starting position. In 2008, Muhtadi finished third in sacks for the Terrapins. He was also only the second player in the past 15 years to play all defensive line positions in a game for the Terrapins.

Pre-draft measurables
Height	Weight	Bench press
6 ft 3 1/4 in (1.91 m)	292 lb (132 kg)	34 reps
All values from Pro Day.

Muhtadi owns several of Maryland's all-time records for strength and speed: 225 lb. Bench Press Test: 36 repetitions (Team Record) 40 Yard Dash: 4.78 (Defensive Tackle Record) Power Clean: 390 lbs. (Defensive Line Record) Vertical Jump: 36.5 inches (Defensive Line Record) Pro Agility (20-yard shuttle): 4.37 (Defensive Line Record)

=== Professional career ===
Muhtadi was signed by the Green Bay Packers as an undrafted free agent following the 2009 NFL draft on May 4, 2009. He earned his contract on a tryout basis by being one of three players signed out of 25 trying out for the team. Muhtadi was the only player on the depth chart listed at both Defensive End and Nose Guard. On September 3, 2009, in a preseason game against the Tennessee Titans, Muhtadi finished third on the team with 5 tackles, 1 for loss, and a forced fumble. Toward the end of the game, Muhtadi forced a fumble to save a touchdown. He was waived the next day.

Muhtadi was signed by the Arizona Cardinals on January 20, 2010, to play defensive line. Muhtadi became training partners with Darnell Dockett as the two competed against one another every day in workouts. He sustained a calf injury during training camp and placed on injured reserve before being released by the Cardinals.

== Professional wrestling career ==
=== WWE ===
==== Early years in NXT (2012–2015) ====
Muhtadi spent 18 months rehabilitating from the injury he sustained with the Arizona Cardinals. During his recovery, he received offers to return to the NFL and to work in financial services, but instead opted to become a professional wrestler with WWE by August 2012. He joined WWE's developmental territory WWE NXT and he adopted the ring name "Mojo Rawley".

Rawley made his television debut on the May 29, 2013, episode of NXT, competing in a battle royal that was won by Bo Dallas. On the October 9 episode of NXT, Rawley adopted a high-energy character based on the concept of "staying hyped"; Rawley explained that if getting hyped allowed superhuman achievements, he would take it one level higher by staying hyped. Rawley defeated CJ Parker at NXT Arrival and then went on an unbeaten streak, defeating CJ Parker, Sylvester Lefort and Oliver Grey, among others. He also took part in a battle royal to determine the new number one contender where he made it to the final seven before being eliminated by Jason Jordan. On May 29, 2014, at NXT TakeOver event, Rusev beat down Rawley. Rawley then formed a team with Bull Dempsey, but they lost in the 1st round of the number one contenders tournament for the tag titles, causing Dempsey to turn on Rawley. The two faced off at NXT TakeOver: Fatal 4-Way with Rawley losing, he also lost a rematch a few weeks later. In October, Rawley suffered a shoulder injury that would take him out of action for four to six months.

==== The Hype Bros (2015–2017) ====
In June 2015, Zack Ryder debuted in NXT, and returning Rawley formed an alliance with him, dubbing themselves as The Hype Bros. On the June 10 episode of NXT, The Hype Bros went on to defeat Elias Samson and Mike Rallis. On August 22 at NXT TakeOver: Brooklyn, The Hype Bros teamed up with Enzo Amore and Colin Cassady to defeat Jason Jordan, Chad Gable and The Mechanics (Dash Wilder and Scott Dawson) in an 8-man tag team match. On the October 16 episode of NXT, The Hype Bros competed in a match for the NXT Tag Team Championship in a losing effort. On the October 22 episode of NXT, Rawley competed in a 26-man battle royal to determine the number one contender for the NXT Championship, he was unsuccessful, although he was among the last few competitors in the match. On the November 11 episode of NXT, The Hype Bros teamed up with Bayley during an intergender tag team match against Blake and Murphy and Alexa Bliss, where they emerged victorious. On the February 10, 2016, episode of NXT, The Hype Bros defeated Corey Hollis and John Skyler in a tag team match.

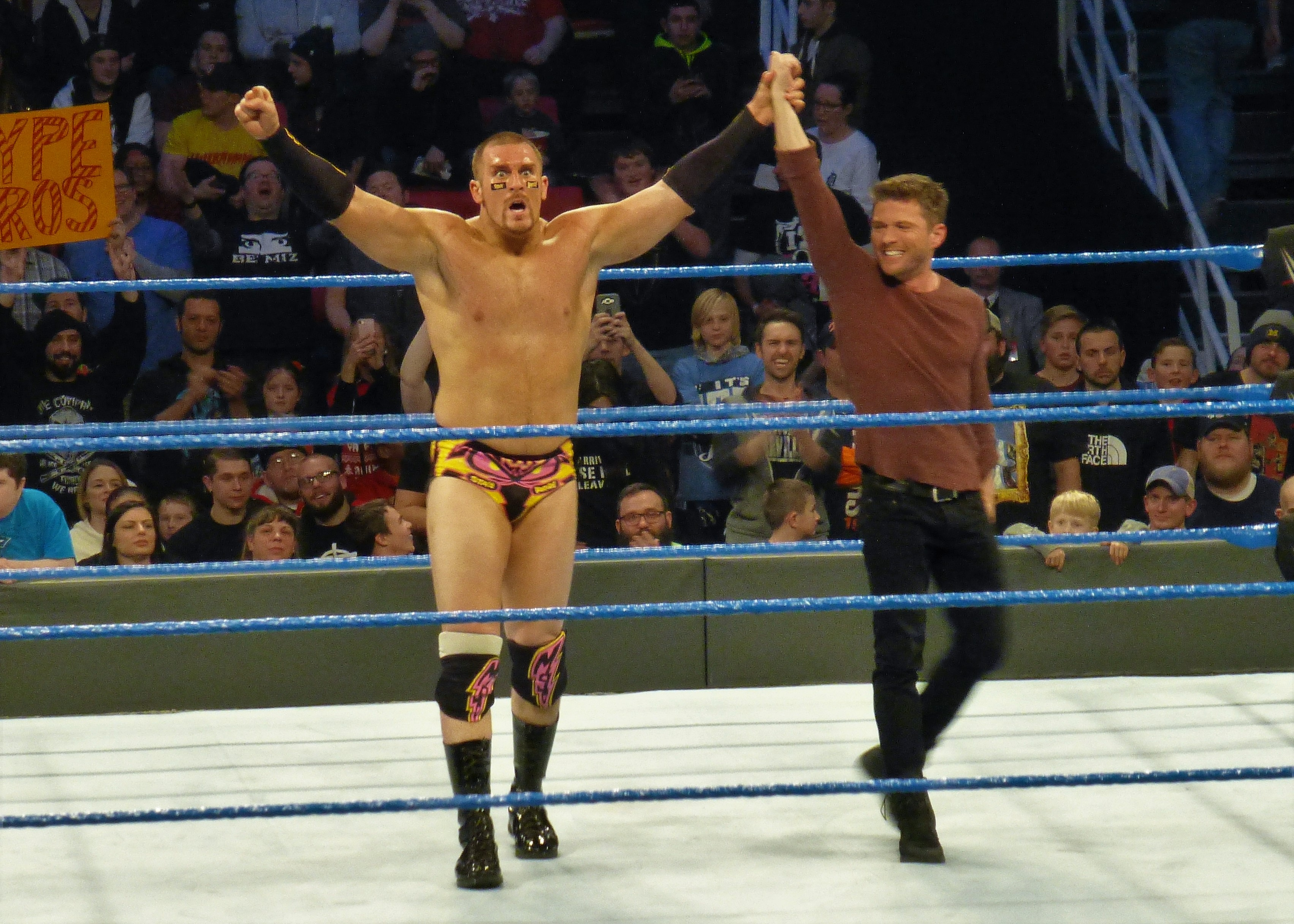
Rawley (left) with Ryan Phillippe in December 2016

On July 19, Rawley was called up to the main roster as a supplemental pick in the 2016 WWE draft, being selected in the 11th round by SmackDown, the brand in which his partner Zack Ryder wrestled. He made his main roster debut at Battleground, helping Ryder against being assaulted post-match by Rusev. On the SummerSlam pre-show, The Hype Bros teamed with American Alpha (Jason Jordan and Chad Gable) and The Usos (Jimmy and Jey Uso) to face The Vaudevillains (Aiden English and Simon Gotch), Breezango (Tyler Breeze and Fandango), and The Ascension (Konnor and Viktor) in a 12-man tag team match, where The Hype Bros' team was victorious. On the August 30 episode of SmackDown, they defeated The Vaudevillains to advance in the WWE SmackDown Tag Team Championship Tournament. The Hype Bros were later eliminated by Heath Slater and Rhyno in semifinals. The Hype Bros would later get a second chance to face Heath Slater and Rhyno in the final at Backlash after American Alpha were injured by The Usos, in a losing effort. On the October 25 episode of SmackDown, The Hype Bros defeated The Ascension to qualify as part of Team SmackDown for the 10–on–10 Survivor Series Tag Team Elimination match at Survivor Series. On the December 13 episode of SmackDown, The Hype Bros won a multi-team battle royal for a chance to take on The Wyatt Family for the titles, but Ryder sustained a knee injury, cancelling their #1 contender status.

After Ryder's injury was determined, the following week on SmackDown, Rawley defeated Curt Hawkins. On the January 24, 2017, episode of SmackDown, Rawley won a battle royal to earn a spot in the 2017 Royal Rumble match. At the event, Rawley entered at number four and was eliminated by Braun Strowman. He then defeated Hawkins on the Elimination Chamber pre-show the following month. Rawley's biggest career win would come on the WrestleMania 33 kickoff show when with the help of then NFL's Rob Gronkowski, he won the fourth annual André the Giant Memorial Battle Royal with the last elimination of Jinder Mahal.

After six months of inactivity, Ryder returned on the June 13 episode of SmackDown, reuniting with Rawley. On June 18, at the Money in the Bank pre-show, The Hype Bros faced The Colóns (Primo and Epico Colón) in a winning effort. Two days later on SmackDown, Shane McMahon announced that The Hype Bros would have an opportunity to become number one contenders for the SmackDown Tag Team championship at the June 27 episode of SmackDown in a match against tag team champions The Usos, in which they were defeated.

After several weeks of losing matches causing dissension between the team, both Rawley and Ryder began to claim that a change was needed. On the November 28 episode of SmackDown Live, after losing to The Bludgeon Brothers (Harper and Rowan), Rawley attacked Ryder, turning heel for the first time in his career. Rawley appeared on the December 5 episode of SmackDown Live, claiming Ryder was dead weight. Rawley and Ryder had a match scheduled at Clash of Champions, which Rawley won.

==== 24/7 Champion (2018–2021) ====
Rawley then competed in a United States Championship tournament, where he defeated Zack Ryder in the first round, but lost to Bobby Roode in the semi-finals. At Royal Rumble on January 28, 2018, Rawley answered Bobby Roode's open challenge for the United States Championship, but was unsuccessful in winning the title. As part of the Superstar Shake-up, Rawley was drafted to Raw brand. On April 27, Rawley participated in the Greatest Royal Rumble, entering at number 29, but was eliminated by Randy Orton. On the June 18 episode of Raw, after defeating No Way Jose, Rawley claimed that he was no longer hyped and simply focused. Over the following weeks on Raw, Rawley defeated No Way Jose, and Tyler Breeze several times. Following a brief feud with Bobby Roode, Rawley found himself off Raw for an extended amount of time. On the January 28, 2019, episode of Raw, Rawley began to appear in pre-recorded segments talking to an off-screen person, blaming them for his lack of success, before being revealed that he was talking to a mirror. On the May 13 episode of Raw, he debuted with a new look, quickly defeating Apollo Crews. However, the gimmick was quietly dropped.

On December 31, Rawley won the WWE 24/7 Championship from R-Truth, his first championship in WWE; however, he would lose it back to Truth moments later. Rawley won the title again on the January 13, 2020, episode of Raw, pinning R-Truth on the entrance ramp. During three house shows from January 17 to 19, Rawley lost the title to Truth, but quickly regained it moments later. On the January 27 episode of Raw, Rawley lost the title to Truth, but he would quickly regain it back by pinning Truth, who was distracted by Rawley's new bodyguard Riddick Moss whom Rawley dubbed his 'offensive lineman', becoming a six-time champion. On the February 10 episode of Raw, Rawley lost the title to Moss after Moss turned on him during a tag team match, ending their alliance.

On the March 13 episode of SmackDown, as a face with his old "Hype" gimmick, Rawley was moved to the SmackDown brand and announced that Rob Gronkowski would be appearing on SmackDown the next week. This move has been seen by critics as a lifeline to Rawley's stagnant career as Gronkowski is more widely known to the general public and is one football's most popular stars before joining WWE. At WrestleMania 36, with no crowd in attendance, Rawley won the 24/7 championship from R-Truth on the first day of the two-day event, marking his 7th title win. The following day, Gronkowski pinned Rawley to win the title. On the June 5 episode of SmackDown, Rawley reverted to being a heel by mocking Shorty G and later joining Shinsuke Nakamura and Cesaro in attacking him. Two weeks later on the June 19 episode of SmackDown, Rawley was defeated by Shorty G in what would be his final WWE match. On April 15, 2021, after ten months of inactivity caused by long-haul COVID, Rawley was released from his WWE contract.

== Other ventures ==
After leaving WWE, Muhtadi and Steven Kaye founded Paragon Talent Group, a talent agency focusing on professional wrestlers. Among the clients of Paragon Talent Group include WWE superstars Alexa Bliss, Nia Jax and Blake Monroe, and All Elite Wrestling (AEW) wrestlers Darby Allin and Mercedes Moné.

== Other media ==
Muhtadi, as Mojo Rawley, made his video game debut as a playable character in WWE 2K17 (as a downloadable character), and has since appeared in WWE 2K18, WWE 2K19, and WWE 2K20. Following his WWE release, Muhtadi appeared in the G.I. Joe prequel film, Snake Eyes. He is currently a co-host on TMZ Sports which airs daily on Fox Sports FS1, and goes by the on-screen name Mojo Muhtadi. Additionally, Muhtadi stars on the "God Bless Football" podcast with his partners Chris Gronkowski, K-Funk, Joba Chamberlain, Billy Gil, Mikey A, and Stugotz.

== Personal life ==
Muhtadi is close friends with retired professional football player, Rob Gronkowski. In January 2022, Muhtadi revealed he had COVID-19 in 2020 and defined it as a near-fatal experience.

On February 12, 2022, Muhtadi got engaged to Gracie Tracy. The couple were married on October 17, 2022, in Florence, Italy. The couple have a child together.

== Championships and accomplishments ==
- Pro Wrestling Illustrated
  - PWI ranked him #111 of the top 500 singles wrestlers in the PWI 500 in 2017
- WWE
  - WWE 24/7 Championship (7 times)
  - André the Giant Memorial Trophy (2017)

== See also ==
- List of gridiron football players who became professional wrestlers
