= Daphanie LaShaunn =

Professional wrestling referee

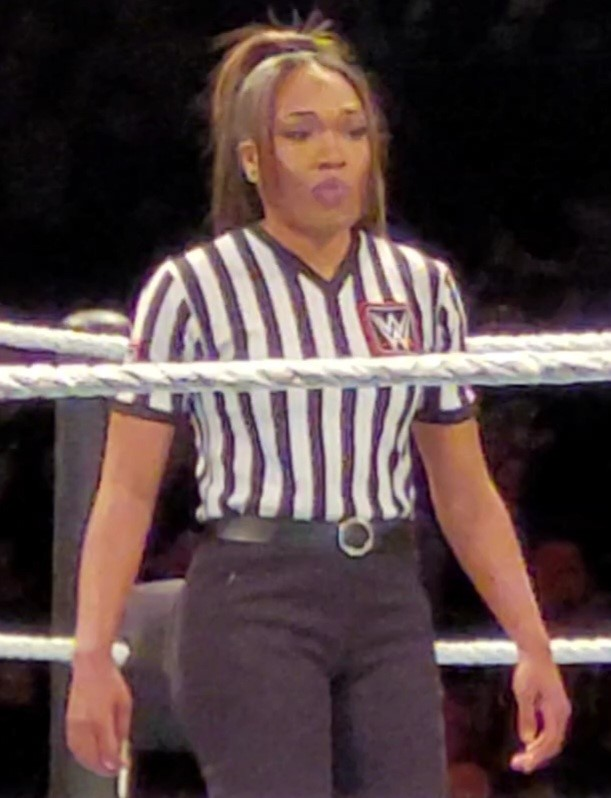
- LaShaunn in 2024

Personal information
- Born: Aja Smith; June 9, 1994 (age 32) Aracajú, Brazil
- Spouse: Leon Ruff (m. 2022)

Professional wrestling career
- Ring name(s): Aja Perera; Daphanie LaShaunn; Momoe-chan; Aja Smith
- Billed height: 5 ft 5 in (1.65 m)
- Billed weight: 154 lb (70 kg)
- Trained by: Fred Avery; Jay Fury

Aja Smith (born June 9, 1994) is a Brazilian-American professional wrestling referee and former professional wrestler. She is signed to WWE under the ring name Daphanie LaShaunn on the SmackDown brand.

== Early and personal life ==
Smith was born June 9, 1994, in Aracaju, Brazil before immigrating to Georgia at a young age, specifically to the city of Conyers.

Smith is married to professional wrestler Dartanyon Ruffin, better known by his ring name Leon Ruff. They announced their engagement on November 30, 2020, and married two years later on September 5, 2022. They have a dog named Juni. On January 21, 2026, it was reported that Smith and Ruffin were involved in a car accident. Two weeks later, Smith lost her grandmother, grandfather, an uncle, and a cousin in a house fire.

== Professional wrestling career ==
=== Independent circuit ===
Smith wrestled for a number of promotions on the independent circuit, most notably for Shine Wrestling, where she won two championships during her tenure, and less notably Girl Fight Wrestling, where she held the Girl Fight Championship for 842 days, from July 12, 2018, through to January 10, 2020.

=== Shine Wrestling (2017–2020) ===
Perera made her in-ring debut for Shine Wrestling at Shine 42 on May 12, 2017, in a losing effort against Dementia D'Rose. Perera would go on to win her first championship, the Shine Nova Championship, later that year at Shine 54 on November 2, 2018, after defeating Candy Cartwright. Perera held the title for 189 days, before losing it to Shotzi Blackheart at Shine 58 on May 10, 2019.

At Shine 61 on September 21, 2019, as the tag team of Triple Aye, Perera and Big Swole won the Shine Tag Team Championships from Rainbow Bright (Gabby Gilbert and Luscious Latasha). They successfully defended the championships for 119 days, before ultimately dropping them to BYE (Jayme Jameson & Marti Belle) at a Shine live event on January 18, 2020, in Fern Park, Florida, in what was Perera's last match with the promotion.

=== WWE (2020–present) ===
In December 2019, Smith was one of 40 athletes to attend a tryout held inside the WWE Performance Center, which was overseen by head coach Matt Bloom. She officially signed with WWE on February 5, 2020. She started out by officiating matches on the NXT brand.

At WrestleMania 38 on April 2 and 3, 2022, Smith made history as the first black female referee to officiate at WrestleMania. In addition, Smith and her fellow female referee Jessika Carr became the first two women to officiate back-to-back WrestleMania matches.

During a live event in Vancouver on September 25, 2022, she won the WWE 24/7 Championship after pinning Nikki A.S.H. She successfully defended the championship after winning it by kicking out of a pin attempt from referee Shawn Bennett, but later lost the title that night to Dana Brooke.

== Other media ==
Smith made her video game debut in WWE 2K24 under her real name of Aja Smith. She can be selected as a referee in most match types, and is a playable character in the special guest referee match.

=== Video games ===
Tyler Bate in video games
Year	Title	Notes	Ref.
2024	WWE 2K24	Playable in Special Guest Referee	—N/a
2025	WWE 2K25	Playable in Special Guest Referee	—N/a
2026	WWE 2K26	Playable in Special Guest Referee	

== Championships and accomplishments ==
- Girl Fight Wrestling
  - Girl Fight Championship (1 time)
- SHINE
  - Shine Nova Championship (1 time)
  - Shine Tag Team Championship (1 time) – with Big Swole
- WWE
  - WWE 24/7 Championship (1 time)
