= Mike Rome =

American television host, ring announcer and backstage interviewer

Personal information
- Born: Austin Michael Romero; October 8, 1981 (age 44) San Diego, California, U.S.

Professional wrestling career
- Ring name: Mike Rome
- Billed height: 6 ft 4 in (193 cm)
- Billed from: San Diego, California
- Debut: September 20, 2012

Austin Michael Romero (born October 8, 1981) is an American television host, ring announcer and backstage interviewer. He is signed to WWE under the ring name Mike Rome, where he is the ring announcer for the NXT brand. He also occasionally serves as ring announcer on other WWE shows. He became a one-time WWE 24/7 Champion, when during a live event on December 27, 2019, he held the title for nine seconds.

== Early life ==
Rome grew up in San Diego, California as a huge fan of WWE's Rock 'n Wrestling era, idolizing Superstars like The Ultimate Warrior and being mesmerized by The Undertaker's debut at Survivor Series in 1990.

== Career ==
=== NXT ring announcer and sporadic Raw appearances (2016–2019) ===
Romero signed with WWE in May 2016, having previously worked for Nickelodeon as a touring emcee, and for Walt Disney World and Universal Studios in Orlando, Florida, as a cast member. He began working as a ring announcer for the NXT brand on its Florida loop. He was also the ring announcer at the Cruiserweight Classic, and made his debut on WWE programming on the September 7, 2016, episode of NXT. His ring name is a shortened version of his middle name and his surname, and he initially went by his full middle name and the shortened version of his surname, before it was changed before a NXT taping to differentiate himself from Michael Cole. Rome would make his main roster debut on the January 16, 2017, episode of Raw, in a backstage segment interviewing Nia Jax. He would continue to make appearances on both NXT and Raw, with his final NXT appearance as an interviewer at NXT TakeOver: Brooklyn 4. From then on, Rome would appear regularly on the main roster shows.

Rome has occasionally been used on Raw or otherwise to further storylines. In an backstage segment in July 2018, Alexa Bliss was promoting Table for 3 on the WWE Network, when Rome walked by and interrupted her, thinking she was asking him out on a date. As part of WWE's online content, Rome would portray a delusional character who was sure he would be having dinner with Bliss.

=== Raw ring announcer (2019–2023) ===
Starting in January 2019, Rome became the main Raw ring announcer after previous announcer JoJo quietly left that position. Beginning in April 2019, Rome, much like his SmackDown counterpart Greg Hamilton, was forced by Shane McMahon to introduce him to the ring with emphasis on the phrase "best in the world" (relating to McMahon's gimmick at the time). On one occasion, Rome's voice gave out towards the end, resulting in McMahon and Roman Reigns visibly laughing as well as Michael Cole and Corey Graves making fun of him. According to Hamilton, Rome was legitimately sick that night and commended him for still pulling off the announcement.

On December 27, Rome won the WWE 24/7 Championship at a WWE Live event in Pittsburgh, Pennsylvania. Samir Singh had just won the title off R-Truth for his third reign, and wanted Rome to announce him as the new champion, prodding him as he did so. Instead, Rome rolled Samir up to win the title and was about to announce himself as the new champion but Sunil Singh surprised him with a roll up to regain the title, also for his third reign.

Following the release of Greg Hamilton in October 2021, he had been announcing on both Raw and SmackDown until January 14, 2022, when Samantha Irvin was called up to the main roster from 205 Live to serve as the ring announcer for SmackDown.

=== SmackDown ring announcer (2023–2024) ===
During the 2023 WWE Draft, Rome and Irvin were both drafted to switch announcing positions taking effect May 8, 2023. As a result, Rome would become the new ring announcer for SmackDown, starting with the May 12 episode. In 2024, he would reduce his announcing roles at premium live events for the brand as Irvin solo announced three out of the four events from January–May, while Rome announced one, which was Elimination Chamber: Perth. He would still announce the weekly shows until his last SmackDown appearance as official ring announcer on April 26, 2024.

=== Return to NXT and sporadic main roster appearances (2024–present) ===
On May 8, 2024, Rome announced on his Instagram account that he was returning as NXT ring announcer, citing being closer to his home in Orlando, Florida, where NXT holds its weekly shows. Alicia Taylor, who was the NXT ring announcer, would take over Rome's role as SmackDown ring announcer.

Rome would make a brief main roster return to announce for WWE's tour to Saudi Arabia for the SmackDown show on May 24 and King and Queen of the Ring on May 25.

== Championships and accomplishments ==
- WWE
  - WWE 24/7 Championship (1 time)
