= Reggie (wrestler) =

American professional wrestler (born 1993)

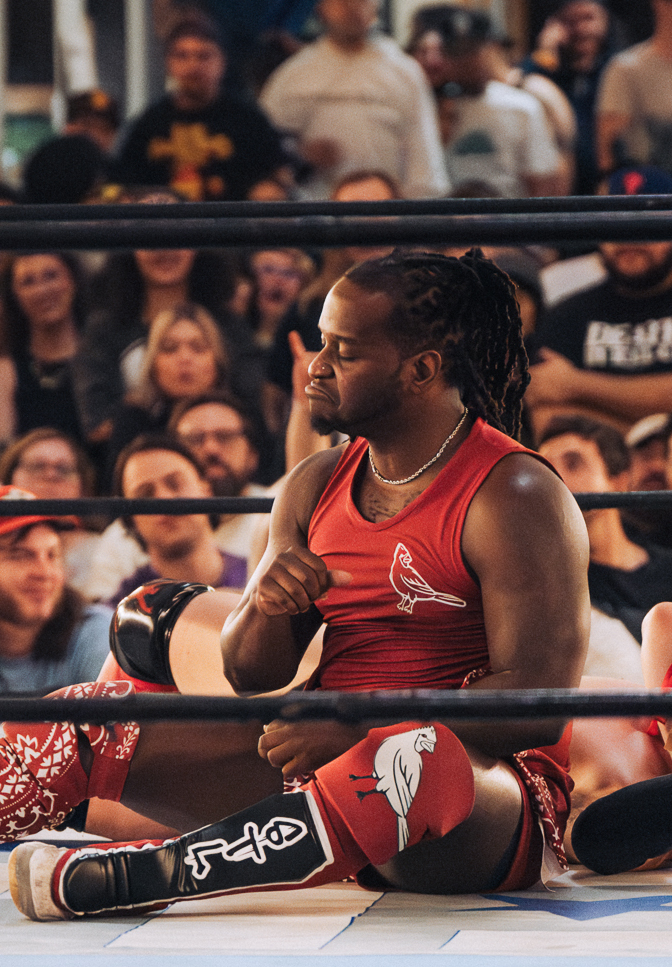
- Bateman in June 2024

Personal information
- Born: Sidney Iking Bateman; March 13, 1993 (age 33) Memphis, Tennessee, U.S.
- Children: 2

Professional wrestling career
- Ring name(s): Akeem Young; Reggie; Reginald; Reginald Thomas; Sidney Akeem; Scrypts; Soleil
- Billed height: 1.70 m (5 ft 7 in)
- Billed from: St. Louis, Missouri
- Trained by: WWE Performance Center
- Debut: 2020

Sidney Iking Bateman (born March 13, 1993) is an American professional wrestler and former acrobat. He performs on the independent circuit under the ring names Sidney Akeem and the masked Soleil. He is best known for his time in WWE, where he worked with the ring names Reggie and Scrypts.

Bateman signed with WWE in 2020 and began appearing on the SmackDown brand under the ring name Reginald Thomas, which was soon shortened to Reginald, a French sommelier. He later dropped the sommelier gimmick and his name was changed to Reggie. While on WWE's main roster, he became a four-time WWE 24/7 Champion—his 112-day first reign was the longest reign for the now-defunct title. After taking a hiatus in mid-2022, he returned in November under a mysterious gimmick of Scrypts in WWE's developmental brand NXT.

== Early life ==
Sidney Iking Bateman was born one of eight siblings in Memphis, Tennessee, on March 13, 1993, but was raised in St. Louis, Missouri. He played football and basketball with circus as a side hobby, but gave those up when, at the age of 16, he joined a gang called the Crips from the 50 Hundred GST (Geraldine Street Thugs). During his junior year in high school, one of his friends was shot to death by a member of a rival gang, leading to Bateman to quit living a gang life and go back to focusing on his circus aspirations.

== Professional wrestling career ==
=== WWE (2020–2024) ===
==== Initial run and 24/7 Champion (2020–2022) ====
On January 14, 2020, Bateman signed a contract with WWE. On the December 11 episode of SmackDown, Bateman, under the ring name Reginald Thomas, soon after shortened to Reginald, debuted as the French sommelier of Carmella, where he would assist her throughout her feud with Sasha Banks. On the January 22, 2021, episode, Reginald made his in-ring debut in an intergender match, facing Banks in a losing effort. His relationship with Carmella ended on the March 5 episode when she fired him. After a short alliance with Banks, Reginald then managed the team of Nia Jax and Shayna Baszler from March to July, but the team turned on him on the July 19 episode of Raw. Later that night, he won the WWE 24/7 Championship when he pinned Akira Tozawa, marking his first title win in WWE.

On the July 30 episode of SmackDown, his ring name was shortened to Reggie. Along with shortening his name, he dropped the French accent. On September 25, 2021, he became the longest reigning 24/7 Champion. On the November 8 episode of Raw, Reggie lost the 24/7 Championship to Drake Maverick, ending his reign at 112 days; however, he regained the title back from Maverick a minute later following a series of title changes. On the November 22 episode, Reggie lost the title to Cedric Alexander, ending his second reign at 12 days.

After losing the title, Reggie then helped Dana Brooke retain the title for a few months, then asked her out on Valentine's Day 2022, though she turned him down. He pinned Brooke in revenge to win the title for the third time. A week later, Reggie lost the title back to Brooke after he laid down in the ring despite kicking out of a two-count twice, as well as playing mind games. They later began dating, with Reggie once again helping her retain the title. On March 28, they got (kayfabe) engaged. On the April 18 episode of Raw, during their wedding, Reggie pinned his partner to win his fourth 24/7 title, losing to Tamina shortly after. On May 2, Brooke lost the 24/7 title to Nikki A.S.H. during a backstage attack. Brooke soon regained the title via pinfall in a 24/7 Championship match. Brooke also requested a divorce from Reggie, after he attempted to pin her. This was his last appearance before taking a hiatus.

==== Move to NXT (2022–2024) ====
In late October, mysterious vignettes began airing on NXT that were done by a person under the alias Scrypts, a seemingly rebellious character who claimed to have unparalleled skills and would bring down NXT. More vignettes aired over the next few weeks and on the November 22 episode of NXT, Reggie debuted for the brand as the mysterious Scrypts, defeating Guru Raaj, changing his ring name and gimmick in the process. During his time in NXT, he had feuds with Ikemen Jiro and Axiom. After being unmasked by Axiom on the May 2 episode of NXT, he turned face and began to work with Axiom as a tag team. On the July 18 episode of NXT, Scrypts turned on Axiom and aligned himself with Bronco Nima and Lucien Price, turning heel and creating the stable Out The Mud (O.T.M.). On May 1, 2024, it was announced that Bateman's WWE contract would expire on June 1.

=== Independent circuit (2024–present) ===
On May 21, 2024, it was announced that Bateman, under ring name Sidney Akeem, would make his debut for Game Changer Wrestling (GCW) on June 15.

On December 19, 2024, at Demand Lucha Very Merry Lucha X-Mas, Akeem unsuccessfully challenged Gringo Loco for his DDT Universal Championship. Akeem's largest match was on January 19, 2025 at the GCW vs The People event, where he wrestled and defeated El Hijo Del Vikingo.

== Personal life ==
Bateman is a father of two. He used to perform in the circus, notably for Cirque du Soleil, training at Circus Harmony for seven years and in Montreal for another three.

== Championships and accomplishments ==
- Atomic Legacy Wrestling
  - ALW Next Level Championship (1 time)
- Pro Wrestling Illustrated
  - Ranked No. 406 of the top 500 singles wrestlers in the PWI 500 in 2024
- WWE
  - WWE 24/7 Championship (4 times)
