= WWE 24/7 Championship =

Former professional wrestling championship

- The 24/7 Championship belt

Details
- Promotion: WWE
- Date established: May 20, 2019
- Date retired: November 9, 2022
Statistics
- First champion: Titus O'Neil
- Final champion: Nikki Cross
- Most reigns: R-Truth (54 reigns) (Note: WWE officially recognizes 53 reigns as his 52nd reign is not recognized.)
- Longest reign: Reggie (1st reign, 112 days)
- Shortest reign: Tucker (1st reign, 4 seconds)
- Oldest champion: Pat Patterson (78 years, 184 days)
- Youngest champion: Bad Bunny (26 years, 342 days)
- Heaviest champion: The Revival (Scott Dawson and Dash Wilder) (446 lb (202 kg) combined)
- Lightest champion: Alexa Bliss (102 lb (46 kg))

The WWE 24/7 Championship was a professional wrestling championship created and promoted by the American promotion WWE. It was a tertiary championship open to anyone—regardless of gender or WWE employment status—and carried the special rule that it could be defended "24/7", as in any time, anywhere, as long as a WWE referee was present. Because of this rule, the championship was available to all of WWE's brand divisions: their two main roster brands, Raw and SmackDown, and their developmental brand, NXT; at the time the championship was established, WWE promoted five brands, two of which were dissolved in 2022—205 Live and NXT UK.

The title was similar to the WWE Hardcore Championship (1998–2002), which also had a 24/7 rule. This rule could be temporarily suspended by an authority figure, usually done during a scheduled title defense or non-title matches that involved the champion. Due to this rule, title changes often occurred outside of regular shows, with videos posted on the promotion's website and social media accounts. Many title changes were also done as humorous segments during televised shows.

The title was unveiled by Mick Foley on the May 20, 2019, episode of Monday Night Raw, where Titus O'Neil from Raw became the inaugural champion. The final champion was Nikki Cross, also from Raw. She had won the title on the November 7, 2022, episode of Raw and then afterwards backstage, discarded the championship by throwing it in a trash can, with WWE deactivating the title on November 9.

== History ==
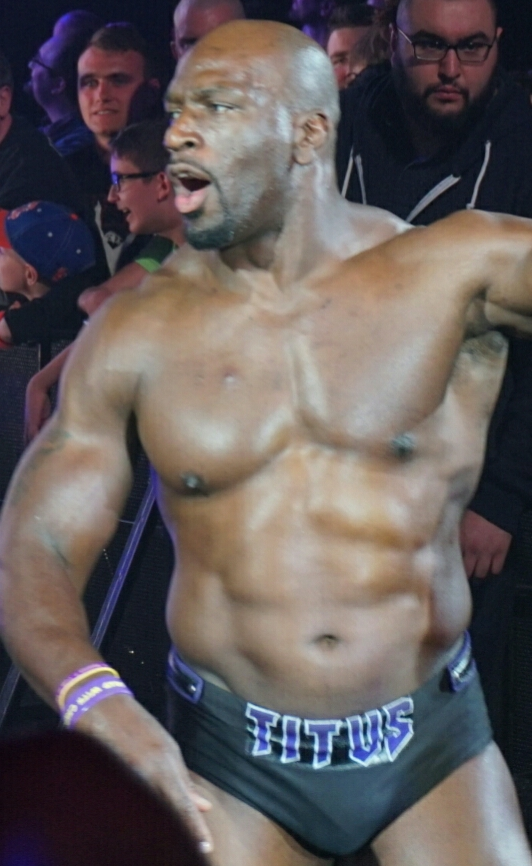
Inaugural 24/7 Champion Titus O'Neil

During the Money in the Bank pay-per-view and livestreaming event on May 19, 2019, WWE announced that a new professional wrestling championship would be introduced on the following night's episode of Raw, where hardcore legend and WWE Hall of Famer Mick Foley unveiled the WWE 24/7 Championship. Like the former WWE Hardcore Championship and its "24/7 rule", the 24/7 Championship could be defended anytime, anywhere, as long as a WWE referee was present, hence its name. Due to this, Foley said the title could be defended across all of WWE's brand divisions: Raw, SmackDown, NXT, NXT UK, and 205 Live (205 Live and NXT UK were dissolved in February and September 2022, respectively). He also said that WWE legends could return and challenge for the title. After the unveiling, Foley laid the title belt in the ring and said that whoever secured the championship first in a scramble would become the inaugural champion. Raw's Titus O'Neil became the inaugural champion by doing so, defeating Cedric Alexander, Drake Maverick, EC3, Eric Young, Karl Anderson, Luke Gallows, Mojo Rawley, and No Way Jose to claim the championship. It was later confirmed that the title was not gender-exclusive and could also be won by non-WWE personnel after the respective wins of former WWE female wrestler Kelly Kelly and Fox sportscaster Rob Stone.

Although a stipulation of the championship, the 24/7 rule could be temporarily suspended by any authority figure. This usually occurred when the champion was involved in a non-title match. For example, after Elias won the title from R-Truth on the May 28, 2019, episode of SmackDown Live, the brand's commissioner Shane McMahon suspended the rule until after the scheduled tag team match later that same night, in which both Elias and Truth were involved. The rule could also be suspended during an actual scheduled match for the title to prevent other wrestlers from getting involved. For example, when R-Truth unsuccessfully defended the title against Elias in a lumberjack match on the June 4 episode of SmackDown. Another example was when reigning champion R-Truth was a guest on The Miz's "Miz TV" talkshow and during a subsequent scheduled match against Drake Maverick, both on the June 24 episode of Raw.

Former WWE wrestler No Way Jose said in a 2021 interview that he had proposed the idea for the 24/7 Championship to a writer about five months before the title's debut. However, according to professional wrestling journalist Dave Meltzer, the idea for the title was proposed by the USA Network, where Raw and SmackDown had both aired, in an attempt to increase the ratings during Raw's third hour. The viewership of both shows had been declining; the April 29 and 30, 2019, episodes of Raw and SmackDown, respectively, both reached a record low for non-holiday broadcasts outside of football season, with viewership dropping off the most during Raw's third hour. In October 2019, Meltzer reported that following the 2019 WWE Draft, the title would only appear on Raw due to SmackDown moving to Fox as the title was USA Network's idea. Although the title was established under the rule that it could be defended on any brand, it primarily only appeared on Raw following that draft, with only a few exceptions (such as an exchange that occurred in Times Square during a segment of Fox's New Year's Eve with Steve Harvey cross-promoting SmackDown).

During the November 7, 2022, episode of Raw, Nikki Cross defeated Dana Brooke to win the championship for an 11th time. Afterwards backstage, Cross discarded the championship as trash. Two days later on November 9, the 24/7 Championship was removed from the active titles page on WWE.com, subsequently retiring the championship with Cross as its final holder. It was reported that after WWE owner Vince McMahon retired in July 2022, the new creative team headed by Chief Content Officer Paul "Triple H" Levesque did not have plans for the title; from that point, it was barely used on television until it was deactivated. According to Senior Vice President of Live Events "Road Dogg" Jesse James, Levesque saw no value in the championship.

== Belt design ==
The championship belt design featured three gold plates on a green leather strap. The circular center plate prominently stated "24/7" at the center with "24" and "7" written in green. The WWE logo was affixed at the top while the word "CHAMPION" was written along the edge of the bottom half of the center plate. The two side plates, one on either side of the center plate, were rectangular. Unlike WWE's other championship belts, the side plates could not be customized with the current champion's logos (likely due to the relatively short lengths of the title reigns with most not lasting a day). They were mostly blank but with a simple ornate design on the bottom inner corner and top outer corner of each. As the belt lacked customizable side plates, Drake Maverick placed stickers that said "Maverick 24:7" in the blank space of the side plates, while Samir Singh placed stickers that spelled "Bollywood" around the center plate (as he and his brother Sunil, also a former 24/7 Champion, teamed together as The Bollywood Boyz).

== Reigns ==
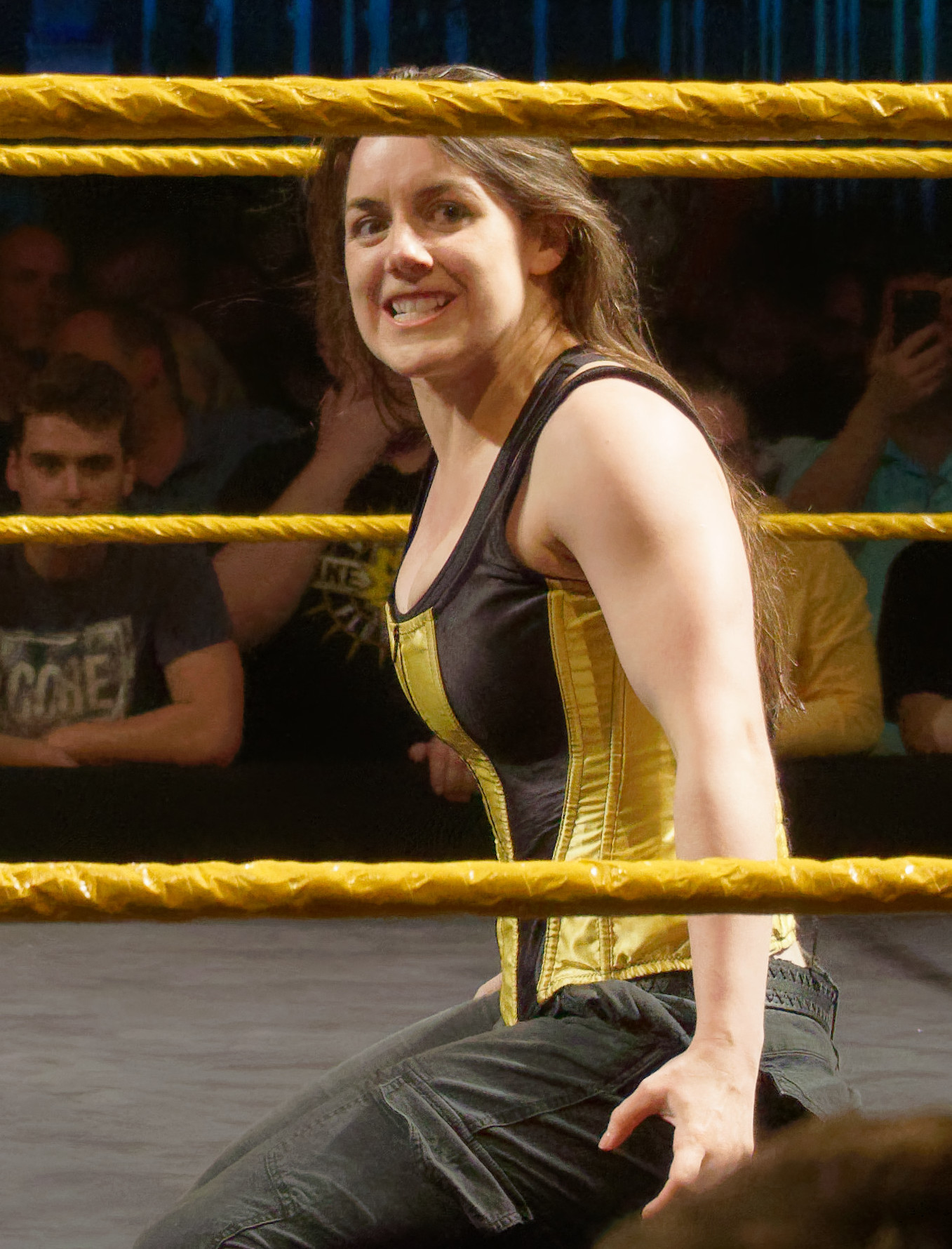
11-time and final champion Nikki Cross; during her first eight reigns, she was known as Nikki A.S.H.

Over the championship's 3 year, 5 month, and 20 day history, there were 202 officially recognized reigns between 57 different people; there are three reigns that are not recognized on the official title history on WWE.com. R-Truth had the most reigns at 54 and the longest combined reign at 425 days (53 and 415 days, respectively, as recognized by WWE). Reggie had the longest singular reign at 112 days for his first reign. Only 15 other people had a reign that lasted longer than a day (24 hours): Angel Garza, Akira Tozawa, Bad Bunny, Carmella, Dana Brooke, Drake Maverick, Drew Gulak, Elias, Maria Kanellis, Mojo Rawley, Riddick Moss, Rob Gronkowski, Shelton Benjamin, and both Singh Brothers, Samir and Sunil. Tucker's first reign was the shortest reign, which lasted approximately four seconds.

WWE Hall of Famer Pat Patterson was the oldest champion, winning the title at 78 years old (which also made him the oldest title holder in WWE history), while Bad Bunny was the youngest, winning the title at 26. Former WWE wrestler Kelly Kelly was the first of 11 women to win the title. WWE Hall of Famer "The Million Dollar Man" Ted DiBiase and R-Truth were the only title holders to hold the championship without winning the title as a result of a pinfall or submission; DiBiase purchased it from fellow Hall of Famer Alundra Blayze, who was about to drop the belt into a trash can (reenacting the infamous incident where she did the same to the then-WWF Women's Championship after joining World Championship Wrestling in 1995), while R-Truth's 50th reign began after he convinced Bad Bunny to exchange the title for some "Stone Cold" Steve Austin memorabilia. The Revival (Scott Dawson and Dash Wilder) were the only tag team to win the title and were recognized as co-champions. The final champion was Nikki Cross.

Non-wrestlers that held the title include Fox sportscaster Rob Stone, NBA player Enes Kanter, electronic music producer/disc jockey Marshmello, then-WWE Senior Account Manager Michael Giaccio, NASCAR Cup Series driver Kyle Busch, Raw announcer Mike Rome, NFL player Rob Gronkowski, radio personality and WWE pre-show panelist Peter Rosenberg, former NFL, CFL, and USFL player Doug Flutie, Puerto Rican reggaeton, rap, and trap singer Bad Bunny, infamous WWE gimmick The Gobbledy Gooker (portrayed by Drew Gulak), WWE commentators Corey Graves and Byron Saxton, and WWE referees Daphanie LaShaunn, Shawn Bennett, and Eddie Orengo.

== Reception ==
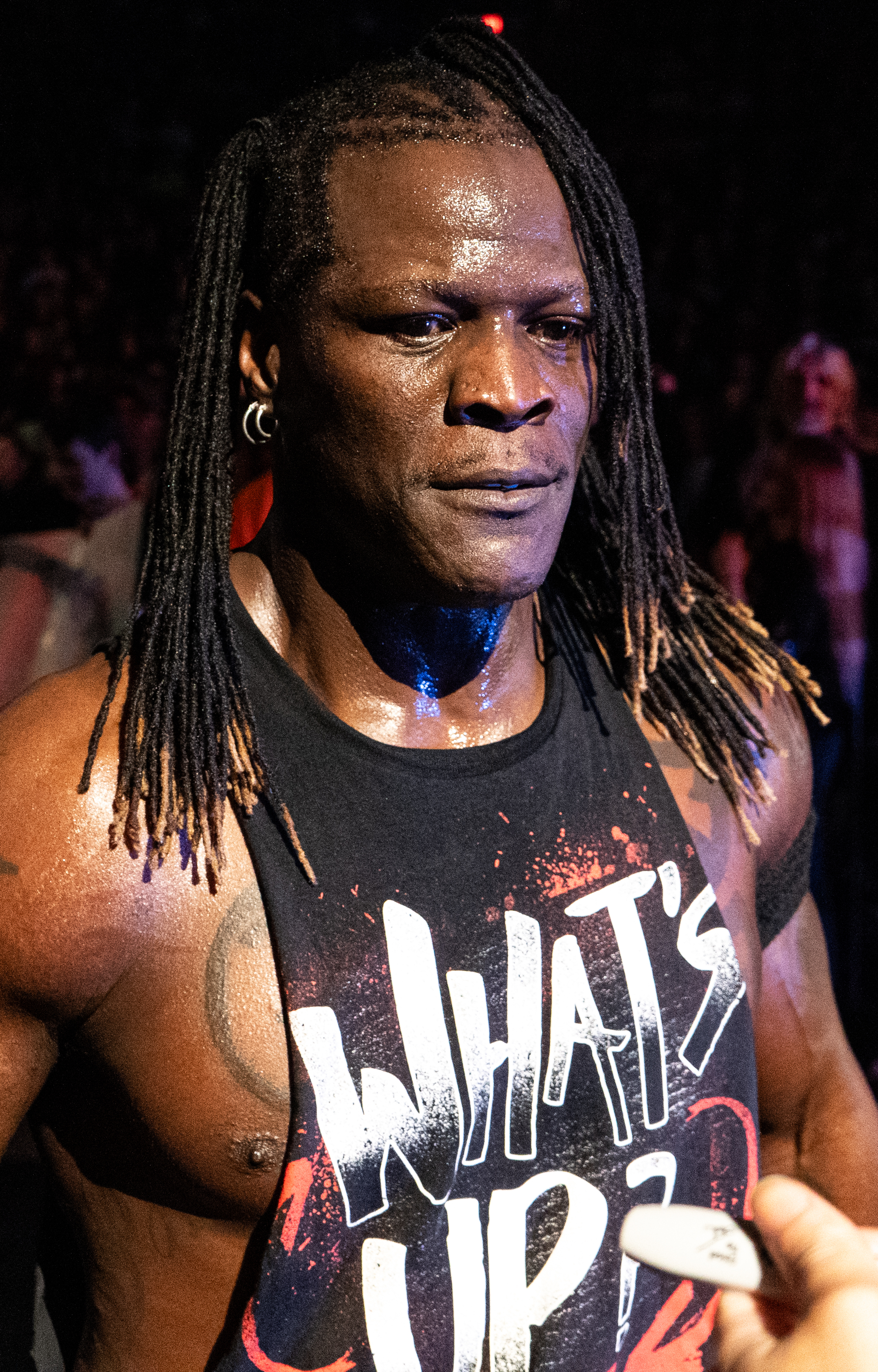
R-Truth held the championship for a record 54 reigns. He was also voted as the favorite WWE champion in June 2019 for his reigns with the 24/7 Championship at that time.

The championship's reveal received a negative reaction from the live crowd at MVP Arena in Albany, New York, who booed it during the unveiling. Foley said that the bad reception was probably due to the fans wanting to see the Hardcore Championship return as opposed to this new title. Foley was hopeful that it would bring back the fun and excitement that the Hardcore title had with its 24/7 rule, but without the same danger. Fellow WWE Hall of Famer Edge said the concept was fun but the belt "[was] the ugliest championship ever created". Mike Johnson of PWInsider liked the concept but said the introduction was "silly", since fans "believed, just for a second, this belt was going to be something that was unveiled that brought a gritty, edge back".

The title's popularity with the fans would subsequently improve; within weeks, the 24/7 Championship would get the highest viewed segments of both Raw and SmackDown on YouTube, garnering millions of views each per video. Multi-time 24/7 Champion R-Truth was voted by WWE fans as their favorite champion in June 2019. During the first months of 2020, the 24/7 Championship's reception returned to be negative, with criticisms that highlighted the lack of creativity in the segments and in the matches where the title was involved. On the first anniversary of the title in May 2020, Bleacher Report published an article about how WWE could "revive" the 24/7 Championship's gimmick, saying that "WWE potentially has something special on its hands with the 24/7 Championship gimmick", but that "at times" the title "merely feels like an afterthought".

In August 2022 prior to the championship's retirement, Bleacher Report stated that the title was ultimately unprestigious as it was mainly used and defended in comedic segments and that the title ultimately had a limited shelf life based on its concept. It was also noted that the title's imminent retirement coincided with Triple H moving the company somewhat away from the "over-the-top" sports entertainment aspects of the company after he took over as WWE head of creative in July 2022.
