= 2017 in professional wrestling =

2017 in professional wrestling describes the year's events in the world of professional wrestling.

== List of notable promotions ==
These promotions held notable events in 2017.

Promotion Name	Abbreviation	Notes
All Japan Pro Wrestling	AJPW	
Chikara	—	
Consejo Mundial de Lucha Libre	CMLL	
DDT Pro-Wrestling	DDT	
Lucha Libre AAA Worldwide	AAA	The "AAA" abbreviation has been used since the mid-1990s and had previously stood for the promotion's original name Asistencia Asesoría y Administración.
New Japan Pro-Wrestling	NJPW	
Pro Wrestling Guerrilla	PWG	
Revolution Pro Wrestling	RevPro	
Ring of Honor	ROH	
Total Nonstop Action Wrestling/Impact Wrestling	TNA/Impact	TNA was renamed to Impact Wrestling in March.
World Wrestling Council	WWC	
WWE	—	WWE stands for World Wrestling Entertainment, which is still the legal name, but the company ceased using the full name in April 2011, with the WWE abbreviation becoming an orphaned initialism. WWE divided its roster into three storyline divisions – referred to as brands where wrestlers exclusively performed on their respective weekly television programs. Raw and SmackDown were their two main brands. NXT served as WWE's developmental territory, while a United Kingdom brand under NXT was in its early stages.

== Calendar of notable shows ==
=== January ===
Date	Promotion(s)	Event	Location	Main event	Notes
4	NJPW	Wrestle Kingdom 11	Tokyo, Japan	Kazuchika Okada (c) defeated Kenny Omega to retain the IWGP Heavyweight Championship	
6	TNA	One Night Only: Live!	Orlando, Florida	Ethan Carter III vs. Eddie Edwards (c) for the TNA World Heavyweight Championship	
7	TNA	One Night Only: Joker's Wild	Orlando, Florida	14-person intergender Joker's Wild gauntlet battle royal	Aired on February 10.
7	WWC	Euphoria	Bayamon, Puerto Rico	Alberto El Patron fought Carlito to a no contest for the WWC Universal Heavyweight Championship	
8	TNA	One Night Only: Rivals	Orlando, Florida	Jeff Hardy vs. Lashley	Aired on March 17. Final event under the TNA name, as the promotion was renamed to Impact Wrestling the same month that this event aired.
14–15	WWE: United Kingdom	United Kingdom Championship Tournament	Blackpool, England	Tyler Bate defeated Pete Dunne to become the inaugural WWE United Kingdom Champion	
20	AAA	Guerra de Titanes	Mexico City	Johnny Mundo (c) defeated Pentagón Jr. to retain the AAA Latin American Championship	
20	CMLL; NJPW	Fantastica Mania (Tokyo shows)	Tokyo, Japan	Dragon Lee (c) defeated Bárbaro Cavernario to retain the CMLL World Lightweight Championship	
21	CMLL; NJPW	Fantastica Mania (Tokyo shows)	Tokyo, Japan	Máximo Sexy (c) defeated Hechicero to retain the CMLL World Heavyweight Championship	
22	CMLL; NJPW	Fantastica Mania (Tokyo shows)	Tokyo, Japan	Volador Jr. defeated Último Guerrero in a singles match	
28	WWE: NXT	TakeOver: San Antonio	San Antonio, TX	Bobby Roode defeated Shinsuke Nakamura (c) to win the NXT Championship	
29	WWE: Raw; SmackDown	Royal Rumble	San Antonio, TX	Randy Orton won the 30-man Royal Rumble match by last eliminating Roman Reigns to earn a title match for his brand's world championship at WrestleMania 33	Since Randy Orton was a member of the SmackDown brand, he earned a match for the WWE Championship.
(c) – denotes defending champion(s)

=== February ===
Date	Promotion(s)	Event	Location	Main event
5	NJPW	The New Beginning in Sapporo	Sapporo, Japan	Kazuchika Okada (c) defeated Minoru Suzuki to retain the IWGP Heavyweight Championship
11	NJPW	The New Beginning in Osaka	Osaka, Japan	Tetsuya Naito (c) defeated Michael Elgin to retain the IWGP Intercontinental Championship.
12	WWE: SmackDown	Elimination Chamber	Phoenix, AZ	Bray Wyatt defeated John Cena (c), AJ Styles, The Miz, Dean Ambrose, and Baron Corbin in an Elimination Chamber match to win the WWE Championship.
19	DDT	Into The Fight 2017	Tokyo, Japan	Harashima and Kudo defeated Konosuke Takeshita and Dick Togo
26	ROH; NJPW	Honor Rising: Japan	Tokyo, Japan	Bullet Club (Adam Cole and Kenny Omega) defeated The Briscoe Brothers (Jay Briscoe and Mark Briscoe) in a tag team match.
27	ROH; NJPW	Honor Rising: Japan	Tokyo, Japan	Bullet Club (Cody, Kenny Omega, Matt Jackson and Nick Jackson) defeated Chaos (Jay Briscoe, Kazuchika Okada, Mark Briscoe and Will Ospreay) in an 8-man tag team match.
(c) – denotes defending champion(s)

=== March ===
Date	Promotion(s)	Event	Location	Main event	Notes
3–4	Impact	One Night Only: Victory Road – Knockouts Knockdown	Orlando, Florida	Four-on-Four tag team match.	Aired on April 15. First event under the Impact Wrestling name (formerly TNA).
5	WWE: Raw	Fastlane	Milwaukee, WI	Goldberg defeated Kevin Owens (c) to win the WWE Universal Championship.	
10	ROH	15th Anniversary Show	Las Vegas, NV	Christopher Daniels defeated Adam Cole (c) to win the ROH World Championship.	
17	CMLL	Homenaje a Dos Leyendas	Mexico City	Diamante Azul defeated and unmasked Pierroth in a Lucha de Apuesta, mask vs. mask match.	
19	AAA	Rey de Reyes	Monterrey	Aero Star defeated Súper Fly in a Best two-out-of-three falls Lucha de Apuesta, mask vs. hair match.	
20	DDT	Judgement 2017: DDT 20th Anniversary	Saitama, Japan	Konosuke Takeshita defeated Harashima (c) to win the KO-D Openweight Championship	
20	NJPW	New Japan Cup Final	Nagaoka, Japan	Katsuyori Shibata defeated Bad Luck Fale in the tournament final to win the 2017 New Japan Cup.	
(c) – denotes defending champion(s)

=== April ===
Date	Promotion(s)	Event	Location	Main event	Notes
1	ROH	Supercard of Honor XI	Lakeland, FL	The Young Bucks (Matt Jackson and Nick Jackson) defeated The Hardys (Jeff Hardy and Matt Hardy) (c) in a Ladder match to win the ROH World Tag Team Championship.	Last appearance of The Hardys before their return to WWE at WrestleMania 33
1	WWE: NXT	TakeOver: Orlando	Orlando, FL	Bobby Roode (c) defeated Shinsuke Nakamura to retain the NXT Championship.	This event is also notable for the debut of Aleister Black and the return of Drew Galloway (now under the name Drew McIntyre he previously used in WWE)
2	WWE: Raw; SmackDown	WrestleMania 33	Orlando, FL	Roman Reigns defeated The Undertaker in a No Holds Barred match.	This was The Hardy Boyz's return to WWE since 2009.
9	NJPW	Sakura Genesis	Tokyo, Japan	Kazuchika Okada (c) defeated Katsuyori Shibata to retain the IWGP Heavyweight Championship.	
13	NJPW	Lion's Gate Project 4	Tokyo, Japan	Tomoyuki Oka and Yuji Nagata defeated Katsuya Kitamura and Manabu Nakanishi in a Tag team match	
22	Impact	One Night Only: Turning Point	Orlando, Florida	Moose vs. Lashley (c) for the Impact Wrestling World Heavyweight Championship	Aired on May 11.
23	Impact	One Night Only: No Surrender	Orlando, Florida	Lashley (c) vs. Eddie Edwards for the Impact Wrestling World Heavyweight Championship	Aired on June 16.
30	AJPW	Champion Carnival Final	Fukuoka, Japan	Shuji Ishikawa defeated Joe Doering in the tournament final to win the 2017 Champion Carnival.	
30	WWE: Raw	Payback	San Jose, CA	Braun Strowman defeated Roman Reigns in a Singles match.	Final Payback event until 2020.
(c) – denotes defending champion(s)

=== May ===
Date	Promotion(s)	Event	Location	Main event	Notes
3	NJPW	Wrestling Dontaku	Fukuoka, Japan	Kazuchika Okada (c) defeated Bad Luck Fale to retain the IWGP Heavyweight Championship.	
9	NJPW	Lion's Gate Project 5	Tokyo, Japan	Manabu Nakanishi and Yuji Nagata defeated Katsuya Kitamura and Tomoyuki Oka in a Tag team match	
7	ROH; NJPW	War of the Worlds	Toronto, Canada	The Elite (Kenny Omega, Matt Jackson and Nick Jackson) defeated The Addiction (Christopher Daniels and Frankie Kazarian) and Hiroshi Tanahashi in a Six-man tag team match.	
10	ROH; NJPW	War of the Worlds	Dearborn, MI	Chaos (Beretta, Hirooki Goto, Rocky Romero and Will Ospreay) defeated Bullet Club (Cody, Hangman Page and Matt Jackson and Nick Jackson) in an Eight-man tag team match.	
12	ROH; NJPW	War of the Worlds	New York, NY	Christopher Daniels (c) defeated Cody and Jay Lethal in a three-way match to retain the ROH World Championship.	
14	ROH; NJPW	War of the Worlds	Philadelphia, PA	Marty Scurll defeated Adam Cole in a Philadelphia Street Fight match.	
20	WWE: NXT	TakeOver: Chicago	Rosemont, IL	The Authors of Pain (Akam and Rezar) (c) defeated #DIY (Johnny Gargano and Tommaso Ciampa) to retain the NXT Tag Team Championship in a Ladder match.	
21	WWE: SmackDown	Backlash	Rosemont, IL	Jinder Mahal defeated Randy Orton (c) to win the WWE Championship.	The event was also notable for Shinsuke Nakamura's main roster PPV debut where he defeated Dolph Ziggler.
(c) – denotes defending champion(s)

=== June ===
Date	Promotion(s)	Event	Location	Main event	Notes
3	NJPW	Best of the Super Juniors	Tokyo, Japan	Kushida defeated Will Ospreay in the tournament final to win the 2017 Best of the Super Juniors.	
4	AAA	Verano de Escándalo	Ciudad Juárez	Psycho Clown and Dr. Wagner Jr. defeated Nuevo Poder del Norte (Carta Brava Jr. and Soul Rocker) and Los Traidor Clowns (Monster Clown and Murder Clown) in a Six-way Lucha de Apuestas masks vs. masks match.	
4	WWE: Raw	Extreme Rules	Baltimore, MD	Samoa Joe defeated Roman Reigns, Seth Rollins, Finn Bálor, and Bray Wyatt in a Fatal 5-Way Extreme Rules Match to become the number one contender for the WWE Universal Championship at Great Balls of Fire.	
11	NJPW	Dominion	Osaka, Japan	Kazuchika Okada (c) and Kenny Omega wrestled to a time limit draw for the IWGP Heavyweight Championship.	
15	NJPW	Lion's Gate Project 6	Tokyo, Japan	Ayato Yoshida and Satoshi Kojima defeated Tomoyuki Oka and Yuji Nagata in a Tag team match	
18	WWE: SmackDown	Money in the Bank	St. Louis, MO	Baron Corbin defeated Shinsuke Nakamura, AJ Styles, Kevin Owens, Sami Zayn, and Dolph Ziggler in a Money in the Bank ladder match for a WWE Championship match contract.	This event featured the first Women's Money in the Bank ladder match. It also featured the return of Maria Kanellis, who had last performed in WWE in 2010, and the WWE debut appearance of her husband Mike Bennett, under new ring name Mike Kanellis.
23	ROH	Best in the World	Lowell, MA	Cody defeated Christopher Daniels (c) to win the ROH World Championship.	
(c) – denotes defending champion(s)

=== July ===
Date	Promotion(s)	Event	Location	Main event	Notes
1–2	NJPW	G1 Special in USA	Long Beach, CA	Day 1: Kazuchika Okada (c) defeated Cody to retain the IWGP Heavyweight Championship. Day 2: Kenny Omega defeated Tomohiro Ishii for the inaugural IWGP United States Heavyweight Championship.	
2	Impact Wrestling	Slammiversary XV	Orlando, FL	El Patron Alberto (c) defeated Lashley to retain the GFW Global Championship and to win the Impact Wrestling World Heavyweight Championship.	
4	NJPW	Lion's Gate Project 7	Tokyo, Japan	Yuji Nagata defeated Go Asakawa in a Singles match	
9	WWE: Raw	Great Balls of Fire	Dallas, TX	Brock Lesnar (c) defeated Samoa Joe to retain the WWE Universal Championship.	First and only Great Balls of Fire event in WWE.
23	WWE: SmackDown	Battleground	Philadelphia, PA	Jinder Mahal (c) defeated Randy Orton to retain the WWE Championship in a Punjabi Prison Match.	This was the third-ever Punjabi Prison match and the first since 2007 and a one-off return for The Great Khali. This event was the first PPV match for Mike Kanellis in WWE. Final Battleground event
(c) – denotes defending champion(s)

=== August ===
Date	Promotion(s)	Event	Location	Main event	Notes
13	NJPW	G1 Climax	Tokyo, Japan	Tetsuya Naito defeated Kenny Omega in the tournament final to win the G1 Climax 2017.	
18	CMLL / NJPW / RevPro / ROH	War of the Worlds UK	London, England, U.K.	Los Ingobernables de Japón (Bushi, Evil, Hiromu Takahashi, Sanada, and Tetsuya Naito) defeated Bullet Club (Cody, Hangman Page, Marty Scurll, and The Young Bucks (Matt Jackson & Nick Jackson)) in a Ten-man tag team match	
19	CMLL / NJPW / RevPro / ROH	War of the Worlds UK	London, England, U.K.	Cody (c) defeated Sanada in a Singles match for the ROH World Championship	
20	CMLL / NJPW / RevPro / ROH	War of the Worlds UK	London, England, U.K.	Silas Young defeated Jay Lethal in a Street fight	
19	WWE: NXT	TakeOver: Brooklyn III	Brooklyn, NY	Drew McIntyre defeated Bobby Roode (c) to win the NXT Championship.	The event is notable for the debut of Adam Cole and the reunion of the team reDRagon (under new stable name The Undisputed Era) after both members Bobby Fish and Kyle O'Reilly made individual debuts on NXT TV
20	DDT	Ryōgoku Peter Pan 2017	Tokyo, Japan	Konosuke Takeshita (c) defeated Tetsuya Endo to retain the KO-D Openweight Championship	
20	WWE: Raw; SmackDown	SummerSlam	Brooklyn, NY	Brock Lesnar (c) defeated Roman Reigns, Samoa Joe, and Braun Strowman in a fatal four-way match to retain the WWE Universal Championship.	
26	AAA	Triplemanía XXV	Mexico City	Psycho Clown defeated Dr. Wagner Jr. in a two-out-of-three falls Lucha de Apuestas, mask vs. mask match	
(c) – denotes defending champion(s)

=== September ===
Date	Promotion(s)	Event	Location	Main event
1–3	PWG	Battle of Los Angeles	Reseda, Los Angeles	Ricochet defeated Jeff Cobb and Keith Lee in an elimination three-way match to win the 2017 Battle of Los Angeles tournament
1–3	Chikara	King of Trios	Wolverhampton, England	Day 1: House Throwbacks (Dasher Hatfield, Mark Angelosetti and Simon Grimm) defeated House Attack (Chief Deputy Dunne, Jim Obstruction and Lee Obstruction); Day 2: House Strong Style (Pete Dunne, Trent Seven and Tyler Bate) defeated House Throwbacks (Dasher Hatfield, Mark Angelosetti and Simon Grimm); Day 3: House Strong Style (Pete Dunne, Trent Seven and Tyler Bate) defeated House Sendai Girls (Cassandra Miyagi, Dash Chisako and Meiko Satomura)
10	NJPW	Destruction in Fukushima	Fukushima, Japan	Minoru Suzuki (c) defeated Michael Elgin to retain the NEVER Openweight Championship.
12	WWE	Mae Young Classic	Las Vegas, NV	Kairi Sane defeated Shayna Baszler in the tournament final to win the Mae Young Classic.
16	CMLL	CMLL 84th Anniversary Show	Mexico City	Gran Guerrero defeated Niebla Roja in a Best two-out-of-three falls Lucha de Apuestas, mask vs. mask match
16	NJPW	Destruction in Hiroshima	Hiroshima, Japan	Hiroshi Tanahashi (c) defeated Zack Sabre Jr. to retain the IWGP Intercontinental Championship.
22	ROH	Death Before Dishonor	Las Vegas, NV	Cody (c) defeated Minoru Suzuki to retain the ROH World Championship.
24	NJPW	Destruction in Kobe	Kobe, Japan	Kenny Omega (c) defeated Juice Robinson to retain the IWGP United States Heavyweight Championship.
24	WWE: Raw	No Mercy	Los Angeles, CA	Brock Lesnar (c) defeated Braun Strowman to retain the WWE Universal Championship.
(c) – denotes defending champion(s)

=== October ===
Date	Promotion(s)	Event	Location	Main event	Notes
1	AAA	Héroes Inmortales XI	San Luis Potosí, San Luis Potosí	Pagano defeated El Mesías and Joe Líder in a Death Match.	
8	WWE: SmackDown	Hell in a Cell	Detroit, MI	Kevin Owens defeated Shane McMahon in a Hell in a Cell match.	The event was also notable for Bobby Roode's main roster PPV debut where he defeated Dolph Ziggler.
9	NJPW	King of Pro-Wrestling	Tokyo, Japan	Kazuchika Okada (c) defeated Evil to retain the IWGP Heavyweight Championship.	
12	NJPW	Lion's Gate Project 8	Tokyo, Japan	Yuji Nagata defeated Daisuke Kanehira in a Singles match	
12	ROH; NJPW	Global Wars	Buffalo, NY	The Elite (Kenny Omega, Matt Jackson and Nick Jackson) (c) defeated The Kingdom (Matt Taven, T. K. O'Ryan and Vinny Marseglia) in a Six-man tag team match to retain the ROH World Six-Man Tag Team Championship.	
13	ROH; NJPW	Global Wars	Pittsburgh, PA	Luxury Trio (Cody, Kenny Omega and Marty Scurll) (c) defeated Chaos (Toru Yano, Will Ospreay and Yoshi-Hashi) in a Six-man tag team match to retain the ROH World Six-Man Tag Team Championship.	
14	ROH; NJPW	Global Wars	Columbus, OH	The Elite (Kenny Omega, Matt Jackson e Nick Jackson) (c) defeated Best Friends (Beretta and Chuckie T.) and Flip Gordon in a Six-man tag team match to retain the ROH World Six-Man Tag Team Championship	
15	ROH; NJPW	Global Wars	Villa Park, IL	Kenny Omega (c) defeated Yoshi-Hashi to retain the IWGP United States Heavyweight Championship.	
14, 21	Impact	One Night Only: Collision in Oklahoma	Shawnee, Oklahoma	Lashley vs. Alberto El Patrón	
October 14; November 7 December 3	Impact	One Night Only: Canadian Clash	Ottawa, Ontario, Canada; Belleville, Michigan; Windsor, Ontario, Canada	James Storm vs. Alberto El Patrón	
22	WWE: Raw	TLC: Tables, Ladders & Chairs	Minneapolis, MN	Kurt Angle, Dean Ambrose, and Seth Rollins defeated The Miz, Braun Strowman, Kane, Cesaro, and Sheamus in a 5-on-3 handicap Tables, ladders, and chairs match.	Kurt Angle's first match in WWE in since 2006. The event was also notable for Asuka's main roster debut where she defeated Emma, who was released from her WWE contract a few days later.
(c) – denotes defending champion(s)

=== November ===
Date	Promotion(s)	Event	Location	Main event	Notes
5	NJPW	Power Struggle	Osaka, Japan	Hiroshi Tanahashi (c) defeated Kota Ibushi to retain the IWGP Intercontinental Championship.	
5	Impact	Bound for Glory	Ottawa, Canada	Eli Drake (c) defeated Johnny Impact to retain the Impact Global Championship.	Last featured of Gail Kim in Impact.
9	NJPW / RevPro	Global Wars UK	Bethnal Green, United Kingdom	Chaos (Hirooki Goto and Will Ospreay) defeated Suzuki-gun (Minoru Suzuki and Zack Sabre Jr.) in a Tag team match	
10	NJPW / RevPro	Global Wars UK	Walthamstow, United Kingdom	Zack Sabre Jr (c) defeated Will Ospreay in a Singles match for the British Heavyweight Championship	
16	NJPW	Lion's Gate Project 9	Tokyo, Japan	Satoshi Kojima and Yuji Nagata defeated Daisuke Kanehira and Yuma Aoyagi in a Tag team match	
18	WWE: NXT	TakeOver: WarGames	Houston, TX	The Undisputed Era (Adam Cole, Bobby Fish & Kyle O'Reilly) defeated The Authors of Pain (Akam & Rezar) & Roderick Strong and Sanity (Eric Young, Alexander Wolfe & Killian Dain) in a WarGames Match.	This event featured the first WarGames match in nearly twenty years, and the first under the WWE banner.
19	WWE: Raw; SmackDown	Survivor Series	Houston, TX	Team Raw (Kurt Angle, Braun Strowman, Finn Bálor, Samoa Joe, and Triple H) defeated Team SmackDown (Shane McMahon, Shinsuke Nakamura, Bobby Roode, Randy Orton, and John Cena) in a Survivor Series match. Had Team Raw lost, Angle would have been fired as Raw General Manager.	
25	WWE: SmackDown	Starrcade	Greensboro, NC	AJ Styles (c) defeated Jinder Mahal in a steel cage match to retain the WWE Championship	This was the first Starrcade event in 17 years, and the first under the WWE banner. The event was not televised in any form.
(c) – denotes defending champion(s)

=== December ===
Date	Promotion(s)	Event	Location	Main event
5	WWE: Raw; SmackDown	Tribute to the Troops	Naval Station San Diego	AJ Styles, Randy Orton, and Shinsuke Nakamura defeated Jinder Mahal, Kevin Owens, and Sami Zayn in a six-man tag team match
15	ROH	Final Battle	New York City	Dalton Castle defeated Cody (c) to win the ROH Championship.
17	WWE: SmackDown	Clash of Champions	Boston, MA	AJ Styles (c) defeated Jinder Mahal to retain the WWE Championship.
21	NJPW	Lion's Gate Project 10	Tokyo, Japan	Yuji Nagata defeated Yuma Aoyagi in a Singles match
24	DDT	Never Mind 2017	Tokyo, Japan	Konosuke Takeshita (c) defeated Colt Cabana to retain the KO-D Openweight Championship
(c) – denotes defending champion(s)

== Notable events ==
- September 1 – CyberAgent purchased DDT Pro-Wrestling, which also included Ganbare☆Pro-Wrestling and Tokyo Joshi Pro Wrestling, with CyberAgent becoming their parent company.
- December 7 – Alexa Bliss vs. Sasha Banks during a WWE Live tour is the first women's match contested in the Middle East, and specifically, Abu Dhabi, United Arab Emirates

== Tournaments and accomplishments ==
=== Lucha Libre AAA Worldwide (AAA) ===
Accomplishment	Winner	Date won	Notes
Rey de Reyes	Argenis	March 19	
Copa Triplemanía	La Parka	August 26	Last eliminated Averno to win.
Copa Antonio Peña	El Hijo del Fantasma	October 1	Last eliminated Johnny Mundo to win.

=== All Japan Pro-Wrestling (AJPW) ===
Dates		Tournament	Final
Start	Final	Tournament	Final
February 17	February 26	Jr. Battle of Glory	Koji Iwamoto defeated Hikaru Sato to win the 2017 Jr. Battle of Glory.
April 16	April 30	Champion Carnival	Shuji Ishikawa defeated Joe Doering to win the 2017 Champion Carnival.
September 12	September 23	Ōdō Tournament	Suwama defeated Shuji Ishikawa to win the 2017 Ōdō Tournament.
November 3	November 9	Jr. Tag Battle of Glory	Atsushi Maruyama and Masashi Takeda won with a record of three wins and one loss.
November 19	December 12	World's Strongest Tag Determination League	Shuji Ishikawa and Suwama defeated Daichi Hashimoto and Hideyoshi Kamitani to win the 2017 World's Strongest Tag Determination League.

=== Consejo Mundial de Lucha Libre (CMLL) ===
Dates		Tournament	Final
Start	Final	Tournament	Final
February 10	February 24	Torneo Nacional de Parejas Increíbles	Bárbaro Cavernario and Volador Jr. defeated Último Guerrero and El Valiente in a Parejas Increibles tag team match
April 7		Reyes del Aire	Ángel de Oro last eliminated Euforia in a 16-man elimination match
April 14	April 28	La Copa Junior	Soberano Jr. defeated to win the 2017 La Copa Junior Nuevos Valores tournament.
June 2	June 16	Torneo Gran Alaternativa	Soberano and Carístico defeated Sansón and Último Guerrero in the finals of a 16-team "rookie/veteran" tag team tournament.
June 6		CMLL World Heavyweight Championship tournament	Marco Corleone eliminated El Terrible as the last man in a 10-man torneo cibernetico to win the vacant championship
June 10		CMLL World Light Heavyweight Championship tournament	Niebla Roja eliminated Bárbaro Cavernario as the last man in a 10-man torneo cibernetico to win the vacant championship
June 30	July 14	CMLL Universal Championship	Volador Jr. (NWA World Historic Welterweight Champion and CMLL World Trios Champion) defeated Último Guerrero (NWA World Historic Middleweight Champion)
October 13	October 20	Leyenda de Plata	Volador Jr. defeated Carístico after both survived a torneo cibernetico elimination match
October 22	October 29	Mexican National Heavyweight Championship Tournament	El Terrible defeated Diamante Azul to win the vacant championship
November 24		Copa Dinastia	El Cuatrero, Forastero and Sansón defeated the Muñoz family (Dragon Lee, Místico and Pierroth)

=== New Japan Pro-Wrestling (NJPW) ===
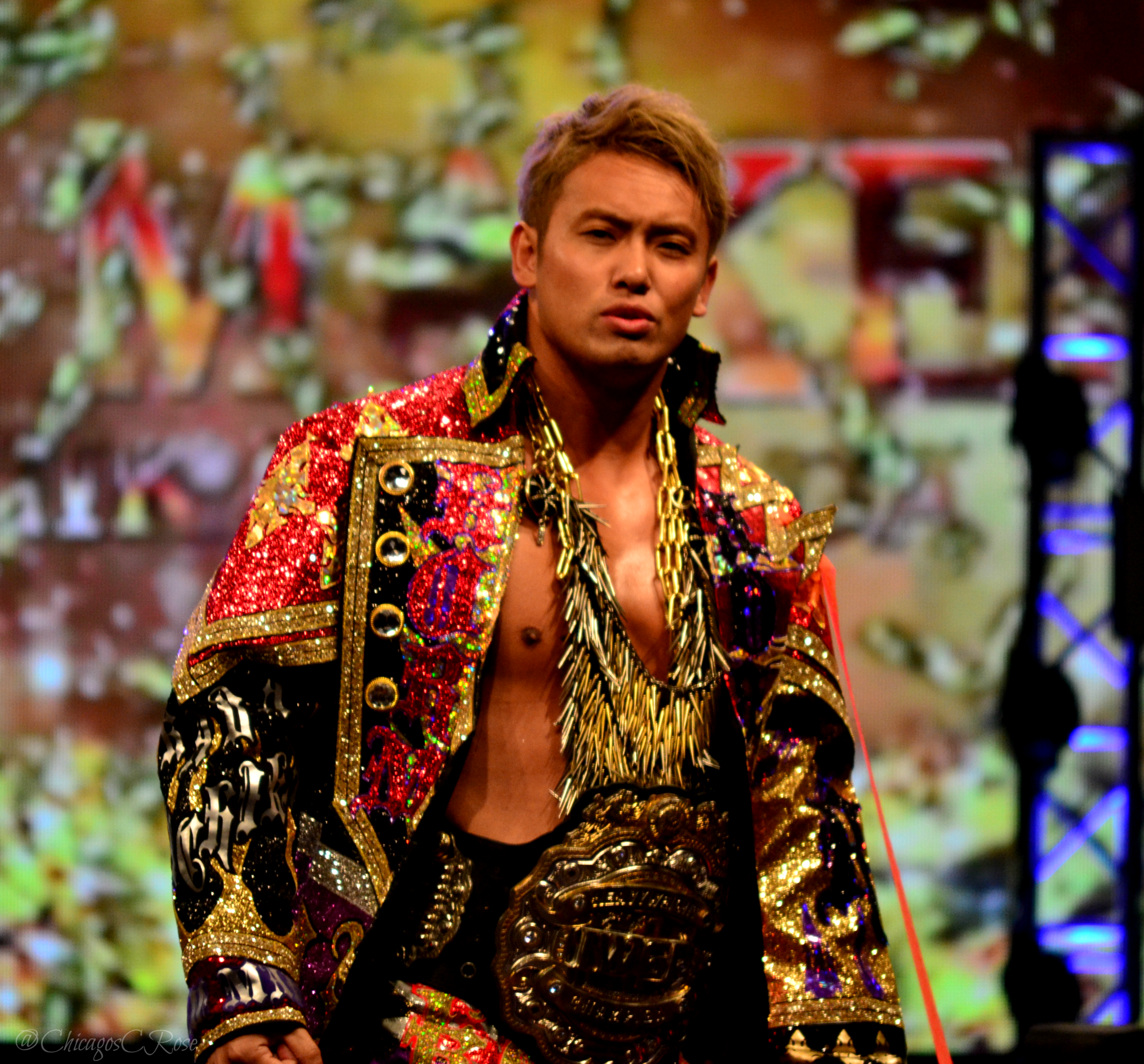
Kazuchika Okada, held the IWGP Heavyweight Championship throughout 2017, breaking the record for the longest reign in the title's history on October 22

Dates		Tournament	Final
Start	Final	Tournament	Final
March 11	March 20	New Japan Cup	Katsuyori Shibata defeated Bad Luck Fale to win the 2017 New Japan Cup and earn himself an IWGP Heavyweight Championship title match.
May 17	June 3	Best of the Super Juniors	Kushida defeated Will Ospreay to win the 2017 Best of the Super Juniors tournament.
July 17	August 13	G1 Climax	Tetsuya Naito defeated Kenny Omega to win the 2017 G1 Climax.
October 23	November 5	Super Jr. Tag Tournament	Roppongi 3K (Sho and Yoh) defeated Super 69 (A. C. H. and Ryusuke Taguchi) to win the 2017 Super Jr. Tag Tournament.
November 18	December 11	World Tag League	Los Ingobernables de Japón (Evil and Sanada) defeated Guerrillas of Destiny (Tama Tonga and Tanga Loa) to win the 2017 World Tag League.
October 12	December 21	Young Lion Cup	Katsuya Kitamura won with a record of five wins and zero losses.

=== Pro Wrestling Noah ===
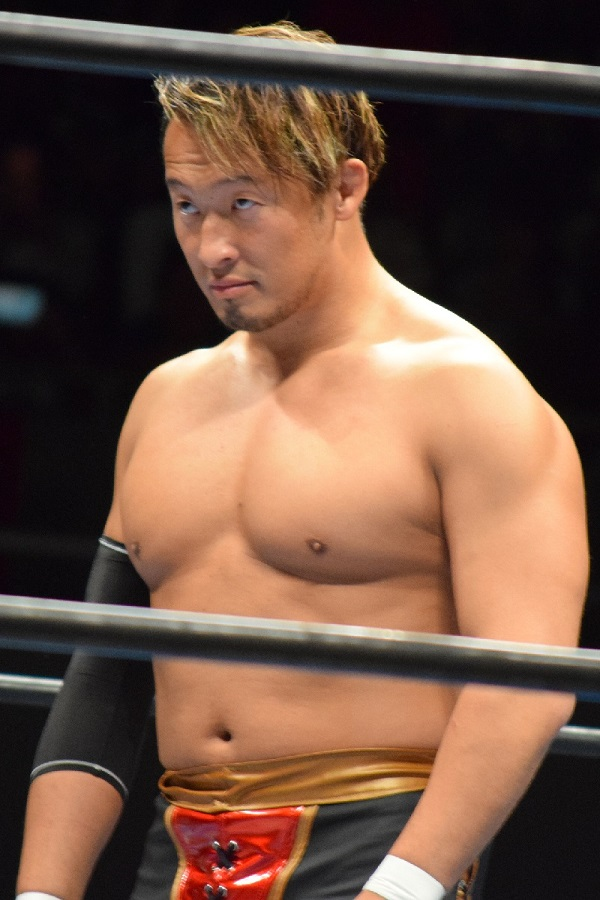
Naomichi Marufuji, three time and 2017 winner of the Global Tag League.

Dates		Tournament	Final
Start	Final	Tournament	Final
April 22	May 4	Global Tag League	Naomichi Marufuji and Maybach Taniguchi defeated Go Shiozaki and Atsushi Kotoge to win the 2017 Global Tag League.
July 13	July 27	Global Junior Heavyweight Tag League	XX (Hi69 and Taiji Ishimori) defeated Ratel's (Hayata and Yo-Hey) to win the 2017 Global Junior Heavyweight Tag League.
October 14	November 19	Global League	Kenoh defeated Go Shiozaki to win the 2017 Global League.

=== Ring of Honor ===
Accomplishment	Winner	Date won	Notes
ROH Soaring Eagle Cup	Dalton Castle	October 28	

=== TNA/Impact/GFW ===
Accomplishment	Winner	Date won	Notes
Joker's Wild	Moose	January 7	
2017 GFW Super X Cup Tournament	Dezmond Xavier	August 17	
Turkey Bowl	Eddie Edwards, Allie, Richard Justice, Fallah Bahh and Garza Jr.	November 23	

=== WWE ===
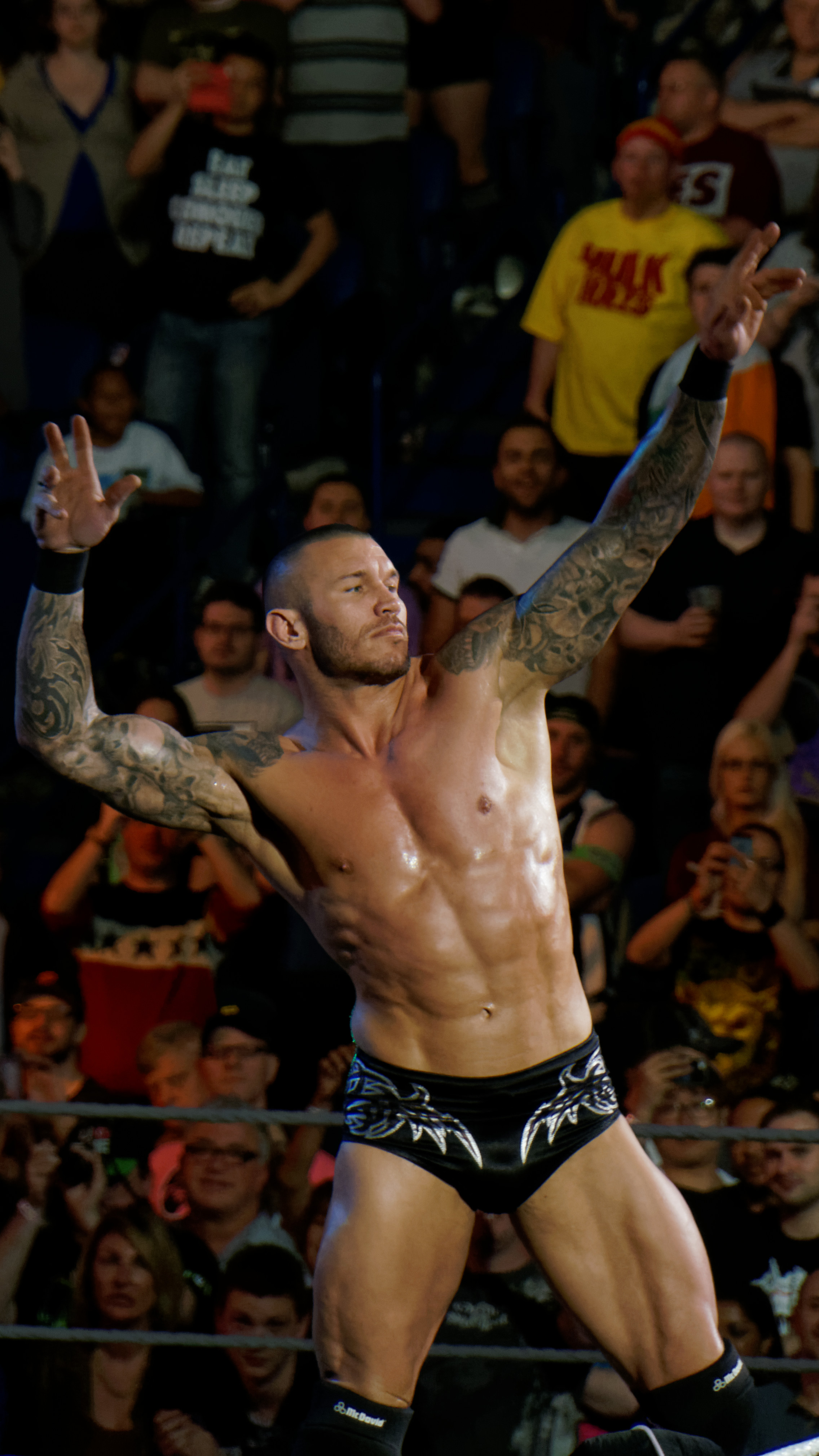
Randy Orton won his second Royal Rumble, the first being in 2009

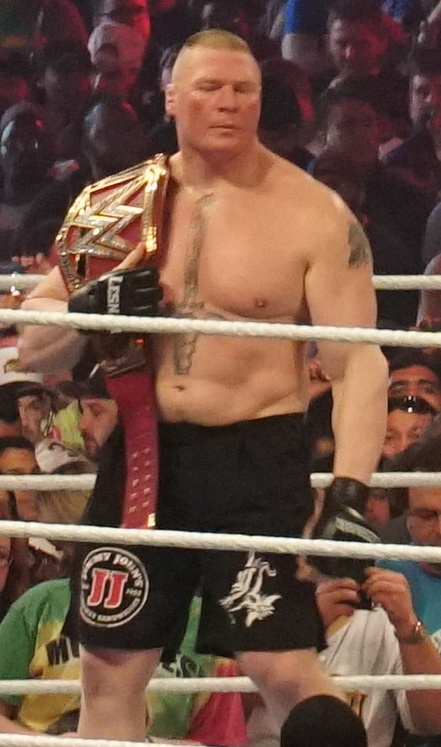
Brock Lesnar, who became the first man to have won both the WWE Championship and WWE Universal Championship when he won the latter at WrestleMania 33

Accomplishment	Winner	Date won	Notes
United Kingdom Championship Tournament	Tyler Bate	January 15	Defeated Pete Dunne in the tournament final to become the inaugural WWE United Kingdom Champion.
Royal Rumble	Randy Orton	January 29	Winner received a championship match for their own brand's world championship at WrestleMania 33—either Raw's Universal Championship or SmackDown's WWE Championship; Orton from SmackDown last eliminated Roman Reigns to win a match for the WWE Championship, which he subsequently won from Bray Wyatt.
André the Giant Memorial Battle Royal	Mojo Rawley	April 2	Last eliminated Jinder Mahal to win the André the Giant Memorial Trophy.
Money in the Bank ladder match (Men)	Baron Corbin	June 18	Defeated Dolph Ziggler, Kevin Owens, Shinsuke Nakamura, Sami Zayn, and AJ Styles to win a WWE Championship match contract. Corbin cashed in his contract on champion Jinder Mahal on the August 15 episode of SmackDown, but failed to win the title due to a distraction by John Cena.
Money in the Bank ladder match (Women)	Carmella	June 18	This was the first Women's Money in the Bank ladder match. Defeated Becky Lynch, Charlotte Flair, Natalya, and Tamina to win a SmackDown Women's Championship match contract, however, SmackDown General Manager Daniel Bryan stripped Carmella of the briefcase two days after the event because of interference by Carmella's manager James Ellsworth, who retrieved the briefcase for Carmella and dropped it to her. A rematch was scheduled for the June 27 episode of SmackDown Live.
Money in the Bank ladder match (Women)	Carmella	June 27	Defeated Becky Lynch, Charlotte Flair, Natalya, and Tamina to definitively win a SmackDown Women's Championship match contract. This was the first Money in the Bank ladder match to not air on pay-per-view, and subsequently the first to take place on SmackDown. Carmella cashed in the contract and defeated Charlotte Flair to win the title on the April 10, 2018, episode of SmackDown.
Mae Young Classic	Kairi Sane	September 12	Defeated Shayna Baszler in the tournament final to win the Mae Young Classic Trophy and a match for the vacant NXT Women's Championship at TakeOver: WarGames, but was unsuccessful in winning the title.

== Title changes ==
=== AAA ===
AAA Mega Championship
Incoming champion – El Texano, Jr.
Date	Winner	Event/Show	Note(s)
March 19	Johnny Mundo	Rey de Reyes	

AAA Latin American Championship
Incoming champion – Johnny Mundo
Date	Winner	Event/Show	Note(s)
October 1	El Hijo del Fantasma	Héroes Inmortales XI	

AAA World Mini-Estrella Championship
Incoming champion – Dinastía
Date	Winner	Event/Show	Note(s)
May 26	Mini Psycho Clown	AAA Worldwide	

AAA World Cruiserweight Championship
Incoming champion – El Hijo del Fantasma
Date	Winner	Event/Show	Note(s)
March 19	Johnny Mundo	Rey de Reyes	

AAA Reina de Reinas Championship
Incoming champion – Taya
Date	Winner	Event/Show	Note(s)
March 19	Ayako Hamada	Rey de Reyes	
April 21	Taya	AAA Worldwide	
July 1	Vacated	N/A	
July 16	Sexy Star	AAA Worldwide	
September 4	Vacated	N/A	
October 1	Lady Shani	Héroes Inmortales XI	

AAA World Tag Team Championship
Incoming champions – Aero Star and Drago
Date	Winner	Event/Show	Note(s)
March 31	Dark Family (Dark Cuervo and Scoria)	AAA Worldwide	
May 26	El Mesias and Pagano	AAA Worldwide	
June 4	Dark Family (Dark Cuervo and Scoria)	Verano de Escándalo	
August 26	Los Totalmente Traidores (Monster Clown and Murder Clown)	Triplemanía XXV	
December 16	Dark Family (Dark Cuervo and Scoria)	Lucha Libre AAA Worldwide	

AAA World Mixed Tag Team Championship
Incoming champions – Vacant
Date	Winner	Event/Show	Note(s)
June 19	Big Mami and Niño Hamburguesa	AAA Television Taping	

AAA World Trios Championship
Incoming champions – Los OGT (Averno, Chessman and Ricky Marvin)
Date	Winner	Event/Show	Note(s)
March 5	Los Apaches (El Apache, Faby Apache and Mary Apache)	AAA Worldwide	
April 21	El Nuevo Poder del Norte (Carta Brava Jr., Mocho Cota Jr. and Soul Rocker)	AAA Worldwide	
June 19	Vacated	AAA Worldwide	
October 1	El Poder del Norte (Carta Brava Jr., Mocho Cota Jr. and Tito Santana)	Héroes Inmortales XI	
November 3	Los OGT (Averno, Chessman and Super Fly)	AAA Worldwide	

=== TNA/Impact/GFW ===
TNA World Heavyweight Championship
Incoming champion – Eddie Edwards
Date	Winner	Event/Show	Note(s)
January 8 (aired January 26)	Lashley	Genesis	This was a 30-minute Iron Man match.
On March 2, the championship was renamed to the Impact Wrestling World Heavyweight Championship following the renaming of the promotion
July 2	Alberto El Patrón	Slammiversary XV	This was a unification match to unify the Impact Wrestling World Heavyweight Championship and the original GFW Global Championship.
The championship was renamed to the Unified GFW World Heavyweight Championship
August 14	Vacated	N/A	Vacated due to Alberto El Patrón's suspension
August 17 (aired August 24)	Eli Drake	Impact!	This was a 20-man Gauntlet for the Gold match. Drake pinned Eddie Edwards to win the match once they were the last two wrestlers.
The title adopted the GFW Global Championship name, but retained the TNA/Impact title history. On September 18, the title was renamed Impact Global Championship.

TNA Grand Championship
Incoming champion – Moose
Date	Winner	Event/Show	Note(s)
January 7 (aired January 19)	Drew Galloway	Impact Wrestling	
January 12 (aired March 2)	Moose	Impact Wrestling	Won by split decision.
On March 2, the championship was renamed to the Impact Wrestling Grand Championship following the renaming of the promotion.
July 5 (aired August 3)	Ethan Carter III	Impact!	Won by split decision.
The title was renamed Impact Grand Championship.
November 10 (aired January 4, 2018)	Matt Sydal	Impact!	

TNA X Division Championship
Incoming champion – DJZ
Date	Winner	Event/Show	Note(s)
January 8 (aired February 2)	Trevor Lee	Impact Wrestling	Lee invoked his Race for the Case for a title opportunity on Open Fight Night. This was a ladder match.
On March 2, the championship was renamed to the Impact Wrestling X Division Championship following the renaming of the promotion.
April 20	Low-Ki	Impact Wrestling	This was a six pack challenge that also included Andrew Everett, Sonjay Dutt, Dezmond Xavier, and Suicide.
May 30 (aired June 15)	Sonjay Dutt	Impact Wrestling	This episode aired on tape delay on June 15.
The title was renamed GFW X Division Championship.
August 19 (aired September 14)	Trevor Lee	Impact!	This was a falls count anywhere match.
The title was renamed Impact X Division Championship.
November 9 (aired January 4, 2018)	Taiji Ishimori	Impact!	

TNA World Tag Team Championship
Incoming champions – The Broken Hardys
Date	Winner	Event/Show	Note(s)
On March 2, the championship was renamed to the Impact Wrestling World Tag Team Championship following the renaming of the promotion.
March 3 (aired March 16)	Vacated	Impact Wrestling	Vacated due to The Broken Hardys leaving TNA.
March 4 (aired March 30)	The Latin American Xchange (Santana and Ortiz)	Impact Wrestling	This was a four-way tag team match also involving Decay, Reno Scum and Laredo Kid & Garza Jr. During their reign, they won and unified the GFW Tag Team Championship with the Impact Wrestling World Tag Team Championship.
The title was renamed as GFW World Tag Team Championship.
August 20 (aired September 28)	Ohio Versus Everything (Dave Crist and Jake Crist)	Victory Road	
The title was renamed Impact World Tag Team Championship.
November 9 (aired January 4, 2018)	The Latin American Xchange (Santana and Ortiz)	Impact!	

TNA Knockouts Championship
Incoming champion – Rosemary
Date	Winner	Event/Show	Note(s)
July 2	Sienna	Slammiversary XV	This was a unification match to unify the Impact Wrestling Knockouts Championship and the GFW Women's Championship.
The title was renamed to GFW Knockouts Championship before being renamed to Impact Knockouts Championship.
November 5	Gail Kim	Bound for Glory	This was a three-way match also involving Allie.
November 6 (aired November 16)	Vacated	Impact!	Title vacated due to Kim's retirement from GFW.
November 8 (aired December 14)	Laurel Van Ness	Impact!	Laurel Van Ness defeated Rosemary to win the vacated title.

=== NJPW ===
IWGP Heavyweight Championship
Incoming champion – Kazuchika Okada
No title changes

IWGP Intercontinental Championship
Incoming champion – Tetsuya Naito
Date	Winner	Event/Show	Note(s)
June 11	Hiroshi Tanahashi	Dominion 6.11 in Osaka-jo Hall	

IWGP United States Heavyweight Championship
(Title created)
Date	Winner	Event/Show	Note(s)
July 2	Kenny Omega	G1 Special in USA	Defeated Tomohiro Ishii in the finals of an eight-man tournament to become the inaugural champion.

IWGP Tag Team Championship
Incoming champions – Guerrillas of Destiny (Tama Tonga and Tanga Loa)
Date	Winner	Event/Show	Note(s)
January 4	Chaos (Tomohiro Ishii and Toru Yano)	Wrestle Kingdom 11	
March 6	Tencozy (Hiroyoshi Tenzan and Satoshi Kojima)	Hataage Kinenbi	
April 9	War Machine (Hanson and Raymond Rowe)	Sakura Genesis	
June 11	Guerrillas of Destiny (Tama Tonga and Tanga Loa)	Dominion 6.11 in Osaka-jo Hall	
July 1	War Machine (Hanson and Raymond Rowe)	G1 Special in USA	This was a no disqualification match.
September 24	K.E.S. (Davey Boy Smith Jr. and Lance Archer)	Destruction in Kobe	This was a three-way tornado tag team match, which also included Guerrillas of Destiny (Tama Tonga and Tanga Loa).

IWGP Junior Heavyweight Championship
Incoming champion – Kushida
Date	Winner	Event/Show	Note(s)
January 4	Hiromu Takahashi	Wrestle Kingdom 11	
June 11	Kushida	Dominion 6.11 in Osaka-jo Hall	
October 9	Will Ospreay	King of Pro-Wrestling	
November 5	Marty Scurll	Power Struggle	

IWGP Junior Heavyweight Tag Team Championship
Incoming champions – The Young Bucks (Matt Jackson and Nick Jackson)
Date	Winner	Event/Show	Note(s)
January 4	Roppongi Vice (Beretta and Rocky Romero)	Wrestle Kingdom 11	
March 6	Suzuki-gun (Taichi and Yoshinobu Kanemaru)	Hataage Kinenbi	
April 27	Roppongi Vice (Beretta and Rocky Romero)	Road to Wrestling Dontaku: Aki no Kuni Sengoku Emaki	
June 11	The Young Bucks (Matt and Nick Jackson)	Dominion 6.11 in Osaka-jo Hall	
August 13	Funky Future (King Ricochet and Ryusuke Taguchi)	G1 Climax 27	
September 24	Roppongi 3K (Sho and Yoh)	King of Pro-Wrestling	

NEVER Openweight Championship
Incoming champion – Katsuyori Shibata
Date	Winner	Event/Show	Note(s)
January 4	Hirooki Goto	Wrestle Kingdom 11	
April 27	Minoru Suzuki	Road to Wrestling Dontaku: Aki no Kuni Sengoku Emaki	

NEVER Openweight 6-Man Tag Team Championship
Incoming champions – David Finlay, Ricochet and Satoshi Kojima
Date	Winner	Event/Show	Note(s)
January 4	Los Ingobernables de Japón (Bushi, Evil and Sanada)	Wrestle Kingdom 11	
January 5	Taguchi Japan (Hiroshi Tanahashi, Manabu Nakanishi and Ryusuke Taguchi)	New Year Dash!!	This was a gauntlet match, also involving Bullet Club (Bad Luck Fale, Hangman Page and Yujiro Takahashi) and Chaos (Jado, Will Ospreay and Yoshi-Hashi).
February 11	Los Ingobernables de Japón (Bushi, Evil and Sanada)	The New Beginning in Osaka	
April 4	Taguchi Japan (Hiroshi Tanahashi, Ricochet and Ryusuke Taguchi)	Road to Sakura Genesis	
May 3	Los Ingobernables de Japón (Bushi, Evil and Sanada)	Wrestling Dontaku	
December 17	Bullet Club (Bad Luck Fale, Tama Tonga and Tanga Loa)	Road to Tokyo Dome	

=== ROH ===
ROH World Championship
Incoming champion – Kyle O'Reilly
Date	Winner	Event/Show	Note(s)
January 4	Adam Cole	Wrestle Kingdom 11	
March 10	Christopher Daniels	15th Anniversary Show	
June 23	Cody	Best in the World	
December 15	Dalton Castle	Final Battle	

ROH World Six-Man Tag Team Championship
Incoming champions – The Kingdom (Matt Taven, T. K. O'Ryan and Vinny Marseglia)
Date	Winner	Event/Show	Note(s)
March 11	Bully Ray and The Briscoes (Jay and Mark Briscoe)	Ring of Honor Wrestling	
June 23	Dalton Castle and The Boys (Boy 1 and Boy 2)	Best in the World	
August 20	The Hung Bucks (Adam Page, Matt Jackson and Nick Jackson)	War of the Worlds UK	

ROH World Television Championship
Incoming champion – Marty Scurll
Date	Winner	Event/Show	Note(s)
May 14	Kushida	War of the Worlds	
September 22	Kenny King	Death Before Dishonor XV	
December 15	Silas Young	Final Battle	

ROH World Tag Team Championship
Incoming champions – War Machine (Hanson and Raymond Rowe)
Date	Winner	Event/Show	Note(s)
March 4	The Broken Hardys (Matt and Jeff Hardy)	War of the Worlds	
April 1	The Young Bucks (Matt and Nick Jackson)	Manhattan Mayhem VI	
September 22	The Motor City Machine Guns (Alex Shelley and Chris Sabin)	Death Before Dishonor XV	

=== The Crash Lucha Libre ===
The Crash Heavyweight Championship
(Title created)
Date	Winner	Event/Show	Note(s)
November 4	Rey Mysterio	The Crash show	Defeated Penta el 0M, La Máscara and Rush in four-way match to become the inaugural champion.

The Crash Cruiserweight Championship
Incoming champion – Flamita
Date	Winner	Event/Show	Note(s)
June 2	Rey Horus	The Crash show	
August 6	Rey Fénix	The Crash/Revolucha show	This was a four-way match also involving Último Ninja and Sammy Guevara

The Crash Junior Championship
Incoming champion – Black Danger
Date	Winner	Event/Show	Note(s)
January 21	Arkángel Divino	The Crash show	
December 25	Black Boy	Team 19/27 show	

The Crash Tag Team Championship
Incoming champions – Garza Jr. and Último Ninja
Date	Winner	Event/Show	Note(s)
January 21	Vacated	N/A	Championship was vacated for undocumented reasons.
January 21	The Broken Hardys (Matt and Jeff Hardy)	The Crash show	Defeated Juventud Guerrera and Super Crazy to win the vacate titles.
March 3	Vacated	N/A	Title vacated after The Broken Hardys left Impact Wrestling

The Crash Women's Championship
Incoming champion – Sexy Dulce
Date	Winner	Event/Show	Note(s)
April 5	Keira	The Crash show	This was a seven-way match, also involving Candy White, Lady Maravilla, Santana Garrett and Laurel Van Ness

=== WWE ===
– Raw
– SmackDown
– NXT

==== Raw and SmackDown ====
Raw and SmackDown each had a world championship, a secondary championship, a women's championship, and a male tag team championship. Raw also had a championship for their cruiserweight wrestlers.

WWE Universal Championship
Incoming champion – Kevin Owens
Date	Winner	Event/Show	Note(s)
March 5	Goldberg	Fastlane	
April 2	Brock Lesnar	WrestleMania 33	

WWE Championship
Incoming champion – AJ Styles
Date	Winner	Event/Show	Note(s)
January 29	John Cena	Royal Rumble	
February 12	Bray Wyatt	Elimination Chamber	Elimination Chamber match, also involving AJ Styles, Baron Corbin, Dean Ambrose, and The Miz.
April 2	Randy Orton	WrestleMania 33	
May 21	Jinder Mahal	Backlash	50th WWE Champion and the first wrestler of Indian descent to win the title.
November 7	AJ Styles	SmackDown Live	First time the WWE Championship changed hands outside of North America.

WWE United States Championship
Incoming champion – Roman Reigns
Date	Winner	Event/Show	Note(s)
January 9	Chris Jericho	Monday Night Raw	2-on-1 handicap match, also involving Kevin Owens, who teamed with Jericho. Jericho pinned Roman Reigns to win the title.
April 2	Kevin Owens	WrestleMania 33	
The title became exclusive to the SmackDown brand following April's Superstar Shake-up when Kevin Owens was drafted to SmackDown.
April 30	Chris Jericho	Payback	Chris Jericho was part of the Raw brand going into the match, but was transferred to the SmackDown brand after winning the title.
May 2	Kevin Owens	SmackDown Live	
July 7	AJ Styles	WWE Live	
July 23	Kevin Owens	Battleground	
July 25	AJ Styles	SmackDown Live	Triple threat match also involving Chris Jericho.
October 8	Baron Corbin	Hell in a Cell	Triple threat match also involving Tye Dillinger.
December 17	Dolph Ziggler	Clash of Champions	Triple threat match also involving Bobby Roode.
December 26	Vacated	SmackDown Live	SmackDown General Manager Daniel Bryan vacated the title after previous champion Dolph Ziggler left the title in the ring the previous week. The United States Championship tournament was announced to crown a new champion.

WWE Intercontinental Championship
Incoming champion – The Miz
Date	Winner	Event/Show	Note(s)
January 3	Dean Ambrose	SmackDown Live	
The title became exclusive to the Raw brand following April's Superstar Shake-up when Dean Ambrose was drafted to Raw.
June 4	The Miz	Extreme Rules	Dean Ambrose could also lose the title by disqualification.
November 20	Roman Reigns	Monday Night Raw	

WWE Raw Women's Championship
Incoming champion – Charlotte Flair
Date	Winner	Event/Show	Note(s)
February 13	Bayley	Monday Night Raw	
April 30	Alexa Bliss	Payback	
August 20	Sasha Banks	SummerSlam	
August 28	Alexa Bliss	Monday Night Raw	

WWE SmackDown Women's Championship
Incoming champion – Alexa Bliss
Date	Winner	Event/Show	Note(s)
February 12	Naomi	Elimination Chamber	
February 21	Vacated	SmackDown Live	SmackDown General Manager Daniel Bryan vacated the title after previous champion Naomi was injured and could not defend the title within 30 days.
February 21	Alexa Bliss	SmackDown Live	Defeated Becky Lynch for the vacant title
April 2	Naomi	WrestleMania 33	Six-pack challenge also involving Becky Lynch, Carmella, Mickie James, and Natalya.
August 20	Natalya	SummerSlam	
November 14	Charlotte Flair	SmackDown Live	

WWE Raw Tag Team Championship
Incoming champions – Cesaro and Sheamus
Date	Winner	Event/Show	Note(s)
January 29	Luke Gallows and Karl Anderson	Royal Rumble; Kickoff	Two referees were assigned to the match.
April 2	The Hardy Boyz (Jeff and Matt Hardy)	WrestleMania 33	Fatal four-way ladder match also involving Cesaro and Sheamus and Enzo Amore and Big Cass. This was originally scheduled as a triple threat ladder match between Gallows and Anderson, Cesaro and Sheamus, and Enzo and Cass, but the returning Hardy Boyz were added to the match by event hosts The New Day right before the match began.
June 4	Cesaro and Sheamus	Extreme Rules	Steel cage match
August 20	Dean Ambrose and Seth Rollins	SummerSlam	
November 6	Cesaro and Sheamus	Monday Night Raw	
December 25	Jason Jordan and Seth Rollins	Monday Night Raw	

WWE SmackDown Tag Team Championship
Incoming champions – American Alpha (Chad Gable and Jason Jordan)
Date	Winner	Event/Show	Note(s)
March 21	The Usos (Jey and Jimmy Uso)	SmackDown Live	
July 23	The New Day (Big E, Kofi Kingston, and Xavier Woods)	Battleground	Kingston and Woods won the match, but Big E was also recognized as champion under the Freebird Rule.
August 20	The Usos (Jey and Jimmy Uso)	SummerSlam; Kickoff	Big E and Xavier Woods represented The New Day.
September 12	The New Day (Big E, Kofi Kingston, and Xavier Woods)	Sin City SmackDown Live	Sin City Street Fight. Big E and Woods won the match, but Kingston was also recognized as champion under the Freebird Rule.
October 8	The Usos (Jey and Jimmy Uso)	Hell in a Cell	Hell in a Cell match; first time a WWE tag team championship was defended in a Hell in a Cell match. Big E and Xavier Woods represented The New Day.

WWE Cruiserweight Championship
Incoming champion – Rich Swann
Date	Winner	Event/Show	Note(s)
January 29	Neville	Royal Rumble	
August 14	Akira Tozawa	Monday Night Raw	
August 20	Neville	SummerSlam; Kickoff	
September 24	Enzo Amore	No Mercy	
October 9	Kalisto	Monday Night Raw	Lumberjack match
October 22	Enzo Amore	TLC: Tables, Ladders & Chairs	

==== NXT ====
NXT Championship
Incoming champion – Shinsuke Nakamura
Date	Winner	Event/Show	Note(s)
January 28	Bobby Roode	TakeOver: San Antonio	
August 19	Drew McIntyre	TakeOver: Brooklyn III	The match description for this match on the title's official history on WWE.com referred to the NXT Championship as a world championship, but the title was not officially designated as such.
November 18	Andrade "Cien" Almas	TakeOver: WarGames	

NXT Women's Championship
Incoming champion – Asuka
Date	Winner	Event/Show	Note(s)
August 24 (aired September 6)	Vacated	NXT	NXT General Manager William Regal vacated the title after previous champion Asuka suffered a collarbone injury in her title defense at NXT TakeOver: Brooklyn III.
November 18	Ember Moon	TakeOver: WarGames	Fatal four-way match for the vacant title, also involving Kairi Sane, Nikki Cross, and Peyton Royce.

NXT Tag Team Championship
Incoming champions – #DIY (Johnny Gargano and Tommaso Ciampa)
Date	Winner	Event/Show	Note(s)
January 28	The Authors of Pain (Akam and Rezar)	TakeOver: San Antonio	
August 19	Sanity (Alexander Wolfe and Eric Young)	TakeOver: Brooklyn III	Sanity member Killian Dain had also defended the title, but was not recognized as champion.
November 29 (aired December 20)	The Undisputed Era (Bobby Fish and Kyle O'Reilly)	NXT	

WWE United Kingdom Championship
(Title created)
Date	Winner	Event/Show	Note(s)
January 15	Tyler Bate	United Kingdom Championship Tournament	Defeated Pete Dunne in the tournament final to become the inaugural champion. Title was established for WWE's United Kingdom division, but was defended on the NXT brand in the interim.
May 20	Pete Dunne	TakeOver: Chicago	
Became the top title of the NXT UK brand following the establishment of the brand in July 2018.

== Awards and honors ==
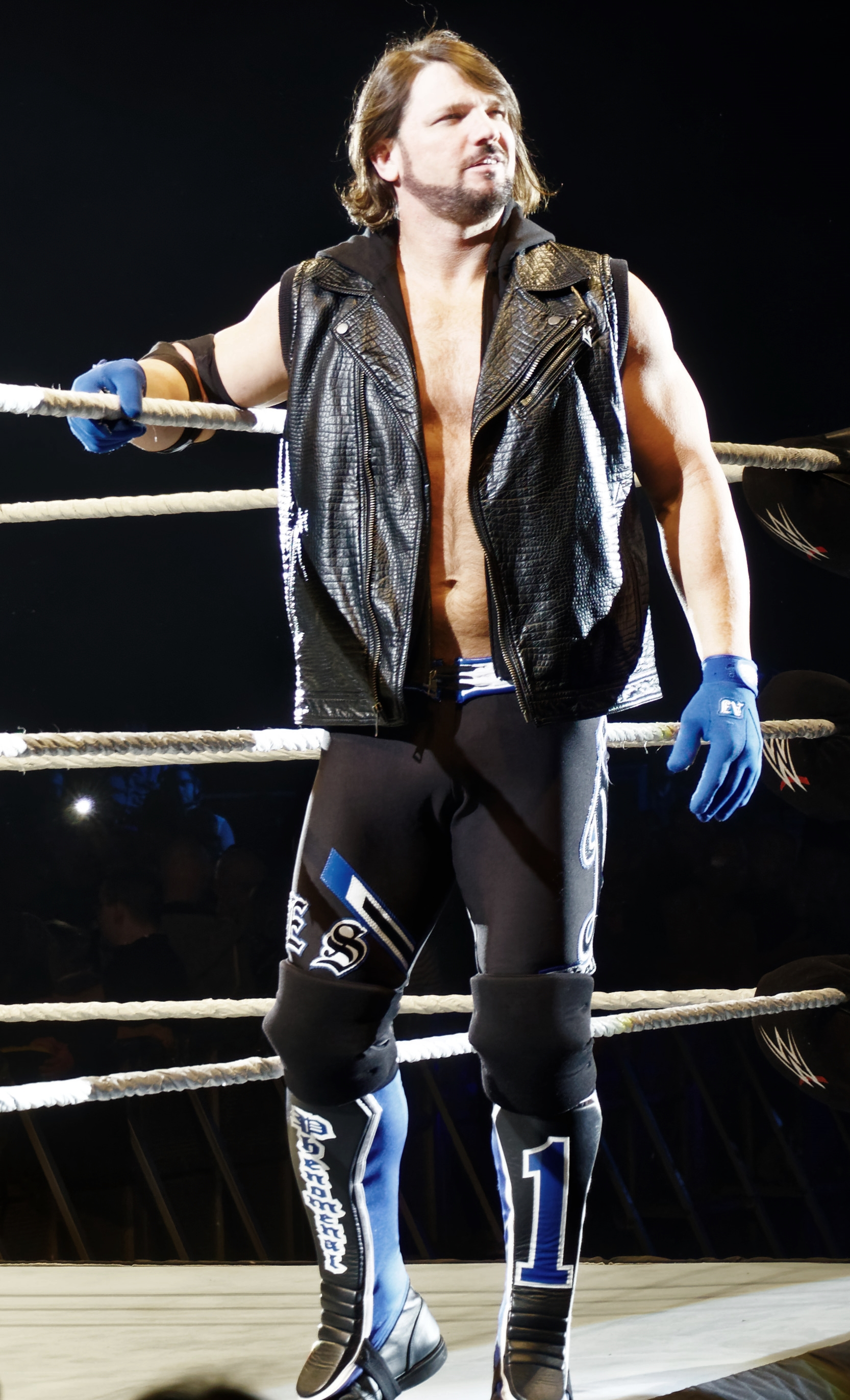
2017 Pro Wrestling Illustrated Wrestler of the Year, AJ Styles

=== Pro Wrestling Illustrated ===
Category	Winner
Wrestler of the Year	A.J. Styles
Tag Team of the Year	The Young Bucks (Matt and Nick Jackson)
Match of the Year	Kazuchika Okada vs. Kenny Omega (Wrestle Kingdom 11)
Feud of the Year	Kazuchika Okada vs. Kenny Omega
Most Popular Wrestler of the Year	A.J. Styles
Most Hated Wrestler of the Year	Jinder Mahal
Comeback of the Year	The Hardys (Jeff and Matt Hardy)
Most Improved Wrestler of the Year	Jinder Mahal
Inspirational Wrestler of the Year	Christopher Daniels
Rookie of the Year	Otis Dozovic
Woman of the Year	Asuka
Stanley Weston Award (Lifetime Achievement)	Jack Brisco

=== Wrestling Observer Newsletter ===
==== Wrestling Observer Newsletter Hall of Fame ====
Inductee
Mark Lewin
A.J. Styles
The Sharpe Brothers (Ben and Mike)
Minoru Suzuki
Pedro Morales

==== Wrestling Observer Newsletter awards ====
Category	Winner
Wrestler of the Year	Kazuchika Okada
Most Outstanding	Kazuchika Okada
Tag Team of the Year	The Young Bucks (Matt and Nick Jackson)
Most Improved	Braun Strowman

=== WWE ===
==== WWE Hall of Fame ====
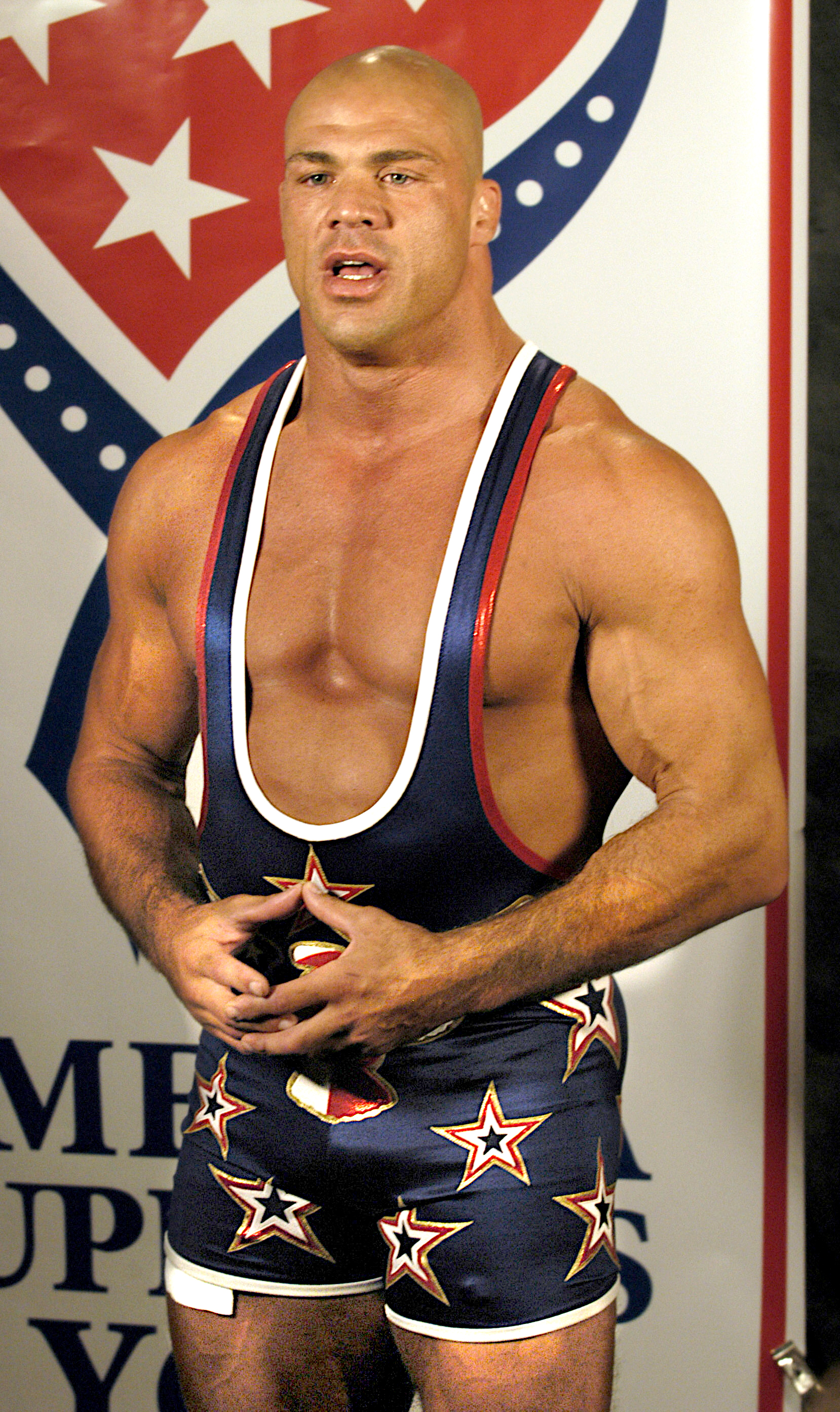
2017 Hall of Fame inductee, Kurt Angle

Category	Inductee	Inducted by
Individual	Kurt Angle	John Cena
Individual	Theodore Long	The Acolytes Protection Agency
Individual	Diamond Dallas Page	Eric Bischoff
Individual	Beth Phoenix	Natalya Neidhart
Individual	Rick Rude	Ricky Steamboat
Group	The Rock 'n' Roll Express	Jim Cornette
Warrior Award	Eric LeGrand	Dana Warrior
Legacy	Martin "Farmer" Burns	
Legacy	June Byers	
Legacy	Haystacks Calhoun	
Legacy	Judy Grable	
Legacy	Dr. Jerry Graham	
Legacy	Luther Lindsay	
Legacy	Toots Mondt	
Legacy	Rikidōzan	
Legacy	Bearcat Wright	

==== NXT Year-End Awards ====
The award winners were announced on NXT TakeOver: Philadelphia on January 27, 2018.

Poll	Winners
Rivalry of the Year	Aleister Black vs. Velveteen Dream
Male Competitor of the Year	Aleister Black
Breakout Star of the Year	Aleister Black
Female Competitor of the Year	Asuka
Match of the Year	Tyler Bate (c) vs. Pete Dunne for the WWE United Kingdom Championship at NXT TakeOver: Chicago
Overall Competitor of the Year	Asuka
TakeOver of the Year	NXT TakeOver: WarGames
Tag Team of the Year	Sanity (Eric Young, Alexander Wolfe, and Killian Dain)
Future Star of NXT	Cezar Bononi

== Debuts ==
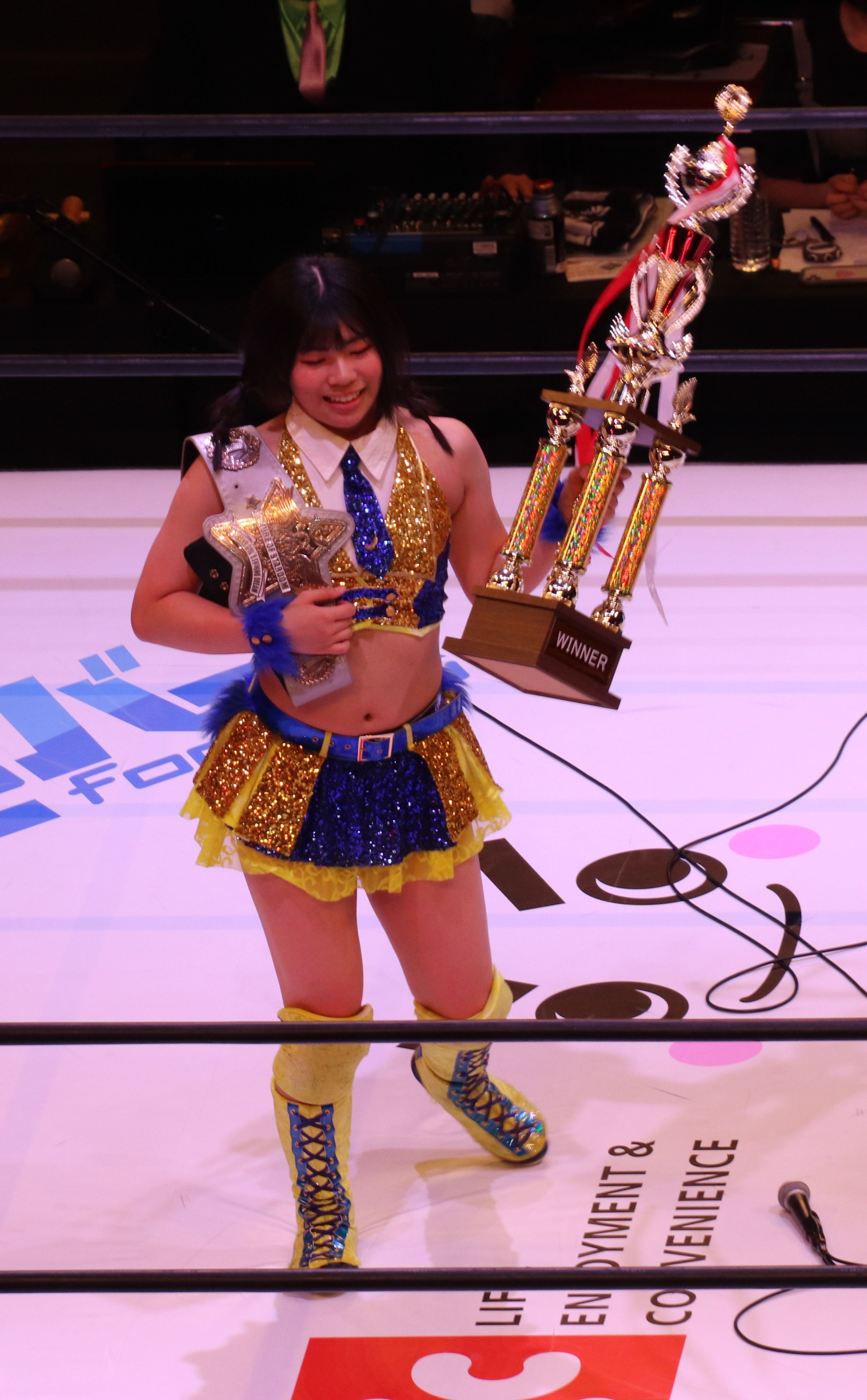
Hanan

- January 3 – Great-O-Khan
- January 15 – Miyuki Takase
- January 17 – Yuya Aoki
- February 18 – Jack Morris
- February 25 – Soma Watanabe
- March 4 – Satsuki Totoro
- March 5 – Hikari Shimizu
- March 26 – Kakeru Sekiguchi
- April 9 – Hanan
- April 15
  - Grayson Waller
  - Leo Isaka
  - Clark Connors
- April 6 – Manami
- April 13 – Shota Umino
- April 16 – Itsuki Aoki
- April 22 – 1 Called Manders
- April 29 – Takato Nakano
- May 4 – Koju Takeda
- May 7 – Debbie Keitel
- May 26 – Will Kroos
- May 27
  - Josh Bishop
  - Lena Kross
- May 28 – Takahiro Katori
- June 11
  - Hina
  - Rina
  - Ibuki Hoshi
- June 18 – Thekla
- June 21 – Alec Price
- June 25 – Miku Aono
- July 1 – Charles Mason
- July 2 – Shoki Kitamura
- July 14 – Yukio Naya
- July 16 – Tyson Maeguchi
- July 27 – Adam Priest
- August 5
  - Alexxis Falcon
  - Liam Gray
- August 18 – Matt Vandagriff
- August 20 – Yuki Iino
- August 26 – Yuki Kamifuku
- September 15 – Sae
- September 16 – Rising Hayato
- September 17 – Adrian Alanis
- September 29 – Leyla Hirsch
- October 13 – Towa Iwasaki
- October 15 – Ayame Sasamura
- October 19 – Rick Boogs
- October 29 – Giulia
- October 31 – Yuna Mizumori
- November 7 – Megan Bayne
- November 12 – Takumi Baba
- November 13 – Tomoyo Hirata
- November 30 – Lee Johnson (wrestler)
- December – Callum Newman
- December 3 – Jay Joshua
- December 8 – Oji Shiiba
- December 24 – Himeka Arita

== Retirements ==
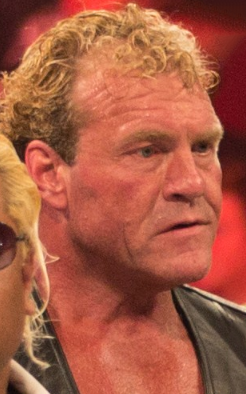
Sid Eudy

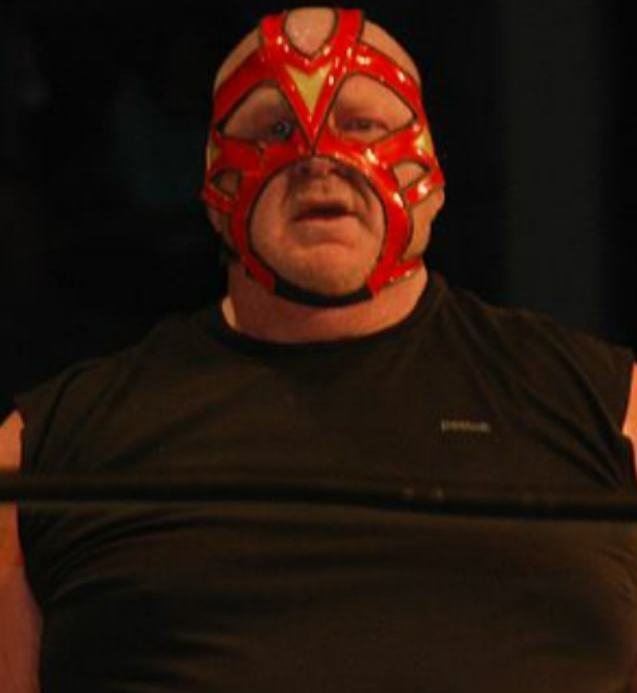
Big Van Vader

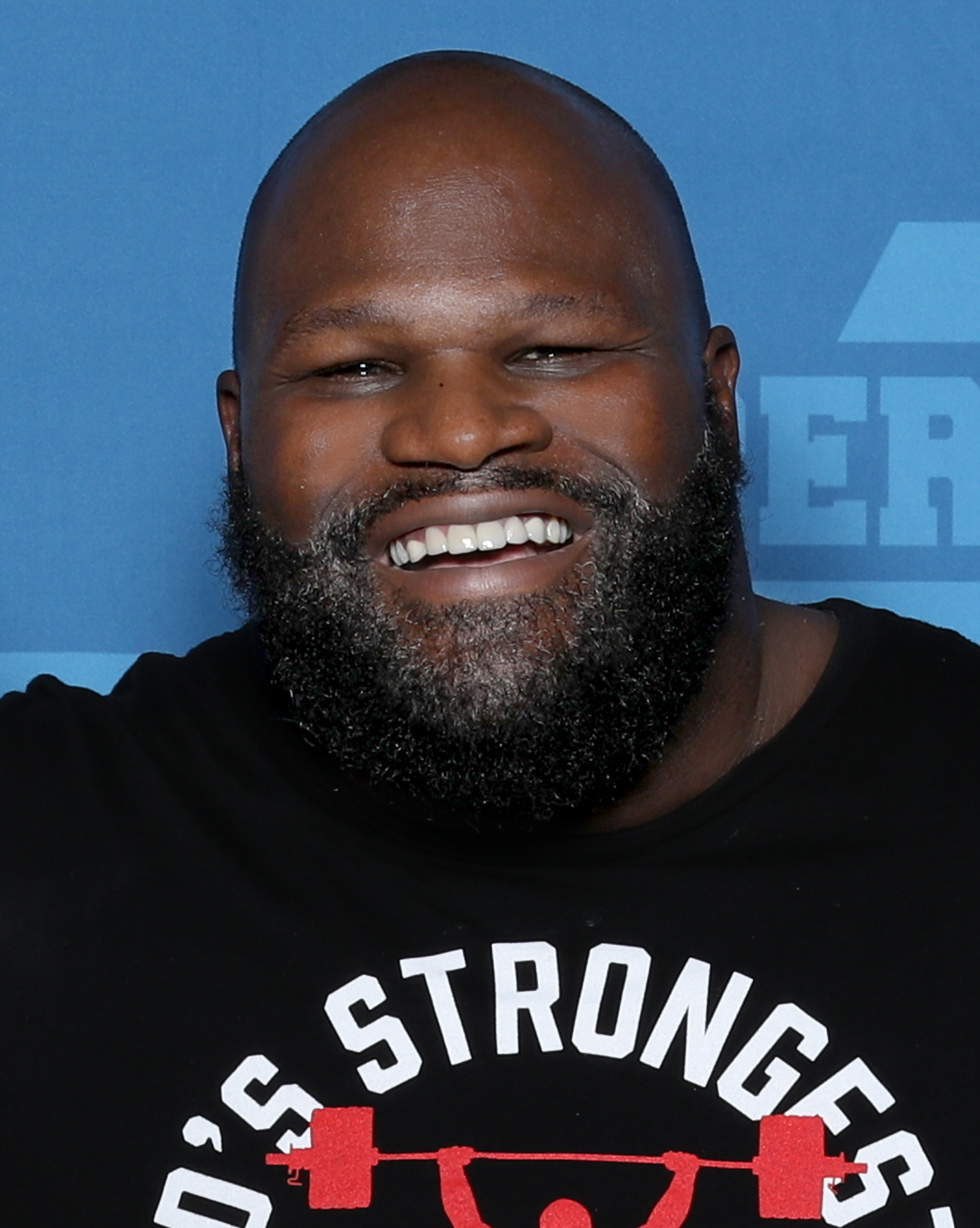
Mark Henry

- Kyoko Kimura (July 20, 2003 – January 22, 2017)
- Saburo Inematsu (March 21, 2004 – February 5, 2017)
- Rosa Mendes (November 2006 – February 13, 2017)
- Kellie Skater (2007 – February 25, 2017)
- Barry Darsow (1983–2001, 2007–2017)
- Sachie Abe (May 2, 1996 – April 2, 2017)
- Akebono Tarō (March 31, 2005 – April 11, 2017)
- Ricardo Rodriguez (August 11, 2006 – May 5, 2017)
- Shelly Martinez (December 2000 – May 17, 2017)
- Tyson Kidd (July 23, 1995 – June 29, 2017)
- Velvet Sky (2003 – July 6, 2017) (return in ROH in 2019)
- Bob Armstrong (1960 – July 13, 2017) (returned for a match in 2019)
- Mark Henry (September 20, 1996 – August 2, 2017)
- Eva Marie (July 1, 2013 – August 4, 2017) (return in WWE in 2021)
- Sid Eudy (1987 – August 5, 2017)
- Bill Eadie (December 15, 1972 – August 12, 2017)
- Big Van Vader (1985-August 26, 2017)
- Danny Havoc (July 30, 2005 – September 9, 2017) (returned to wrestling in 2019 until his death in 2020)
- Terry Funk (1965-September 23, 2017)
- Atsushi Onita (April 14, 1974 – October 31, 2017)
- Manami Toyota (August 5, 1987 – November 3, 2017)
- Candice Michelle (November 15, 2004 – December 2, 2017) (full retirement, through full inactive since 2009)
- Dai Suzuki (November 28, 2014 – December 13, 2017)
- Great Kabuki (October 31, 1964 – December 22, 2017)

== Deaths ==
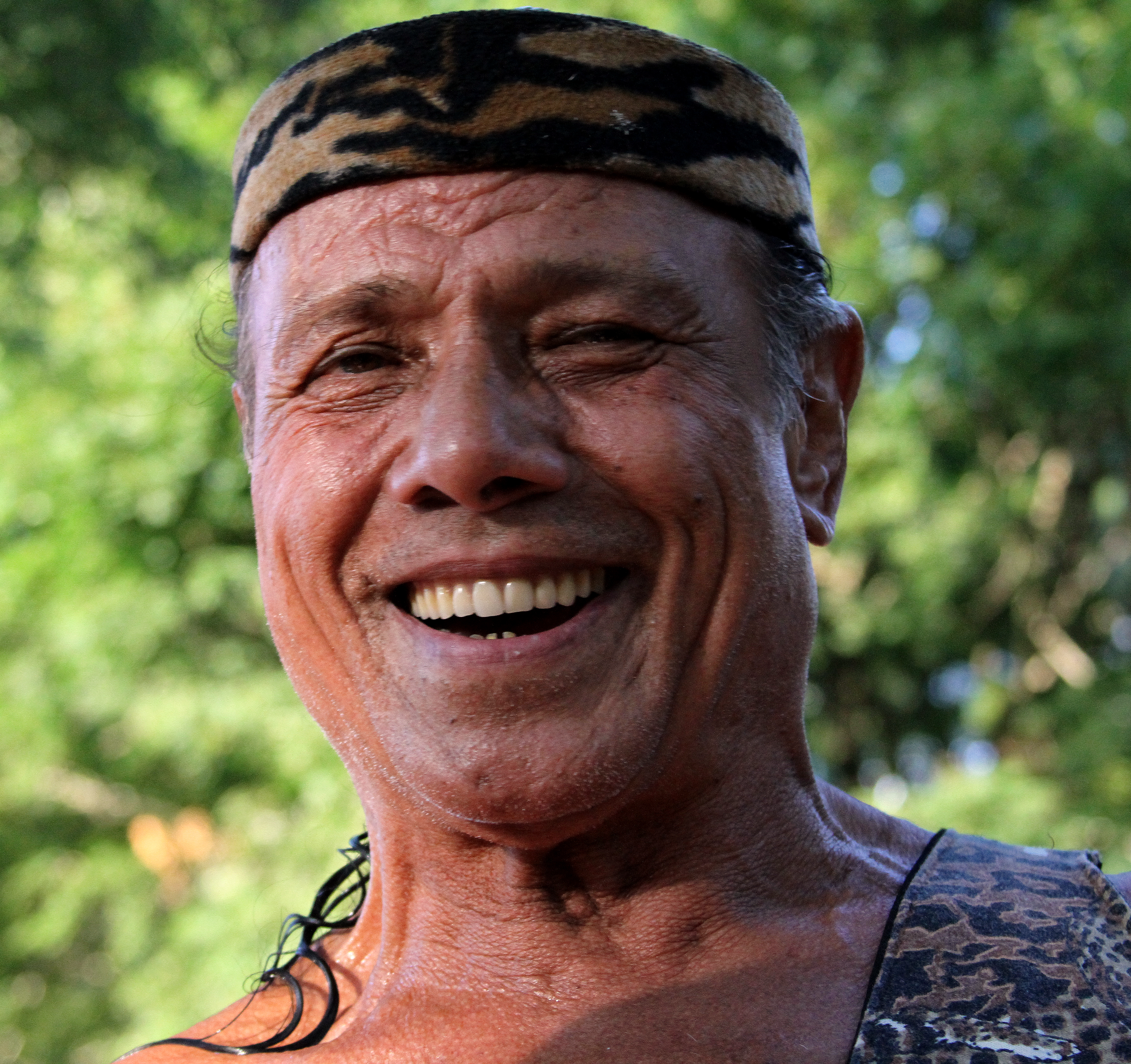
Jimmy Snuka

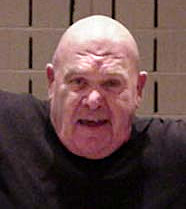
George Steele

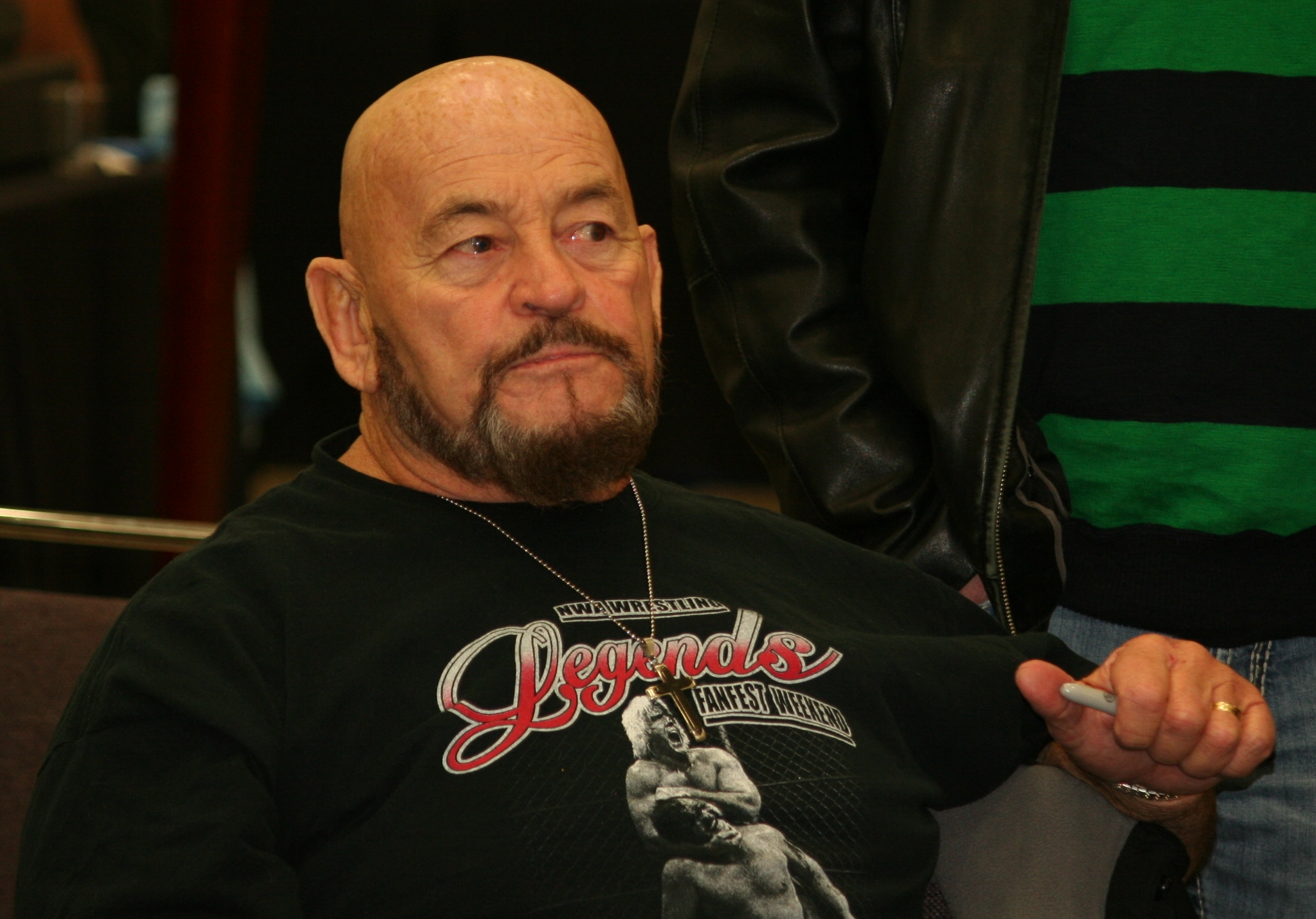
Ivan Koloff

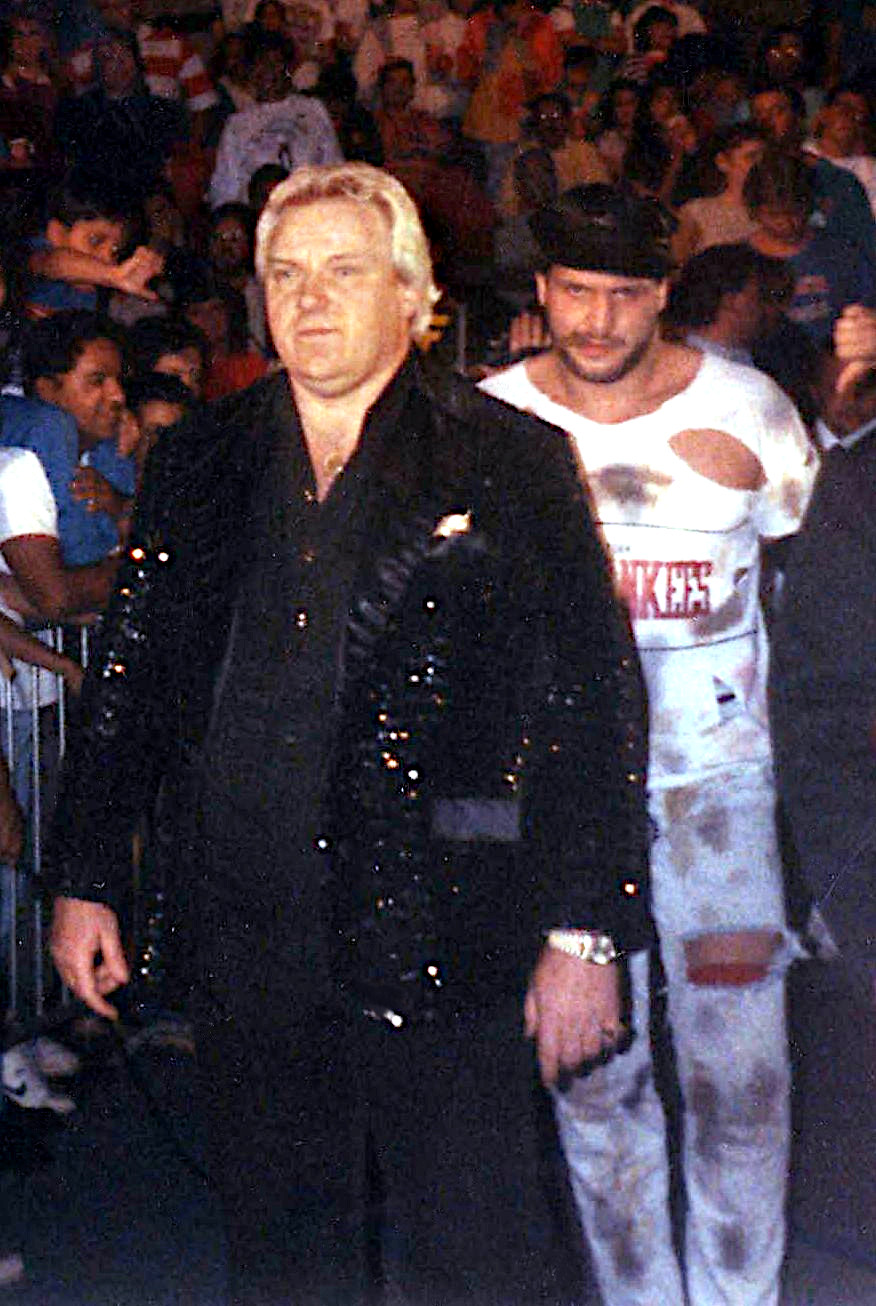
Bobby "The Brain" Heenan (front)

- January 9 – Timothy Well, 55
- January 15 – Jimmy Snuka, 73
- January 25 – Jun Izumida, 51
- February 2 – Tom Drake, 86
- February 10 – Bob Sweetan, 76
- February 11 – Chavo Guerrero Sr., 68
- February 16 – George Steele, 79
- February 17 – Nicole Bass, 52
- February 18 – Ivan Koloff, 74
- February 21 – Bruiser Bedlam, 53
- March 7 – Ron Bass, 68
- March 13 – Dennis Stamp, 70
- April 8
  - Joaquín Roldán, 63
  - Fishman, 66
- April 10 – Larry Sharpe, 65
- April 17 – Rosey, 47
- April 20- Katsuji Ueda, 71
- April 28 – Brazo de Oro, 57
- May 7 – Gran Apache, 58
- May 16 – Doug Somers, 65
- June 8 - Ron Starr, 66
- June 17 – Buddy Wayne, 50
- June 23 – Mr. Pogo, 66
- July 2 – Smith Hart, 68
- July 3 – Joe Robinson, 90
- July 6 – Diane Von Hoffman, 55
- July 11 – Buddy Wolfe, 76
- August 16 - Don Nakaya Nielsen, 58
- September 14 – Otto Wanz, 74
- September 17
  - Bobby "The Brain" Heenan, 72
  - Rey Celestial, 22
- October 3 – Lance Russell, 91
- October 15 – Burrhead Jones, 80
- October 20 – Stan Kowalski, 91
- November 5 - Tokyo Joe (Joe Daigo), 75
- November 8:
  - Eddy Steinblock, 61
  - Tugboat Taylor, 71
- December 9 – Tom Zenk, 59
- December 17 - Rubén Pato Soria, 75

== See also ==
- List of GFW events and specials
- List of MLW events
- List of NJPW pay-per-view events
- List of Impact Wrestling pay-per-view events
- List of ROH pay-per-view events
- List of WWE Network events
- List of WWE pay-per-view events
