= Death Before Dishonor XV =

2017 professional wrestling event

- Promotional poster for the event featuring Minoru Suzuki and Cody
- Promotion: Ring of Honor
- Date: September 22, 2017
- City: Sunrise Manor, Nevada
- Venue: Sam's Town Live

Pay-per-view chronology
← Previous; War of the Worlds UK	Next → Global Wars

Death Before Dishonor chronology
← Previous; XIV	Next → XVI

Death Before Dishonor XV was the 15th Death Before Dishonor professional wrestling pay-per-view (PPV) event produced by Ring of Honor (ROH), which took place on September 22, 2017, at Sam's Town Live in Sunrise Manor, Nevada.

Wrestlers from New Japan Pro-Wrestling (NJPW)—with which ROH has a partnership—also will appear on the card. The event also marks Minoru Suzuki's first appearance in the United States in 25 years.

== Production ==
Other on-screen personnel
Role	Name
Commentators	Colt Cabana
Commentators	Ian Riccaboni

=== Storylines ===
Death Before Dishonor XV will feature professional wrestling matches, involving different wrestlers from pre-existing scripted feuds, plots, and storylines that played out on ROH's television programs. Wrestlers portrayed villains or heroes as they followed a series of events that built tension and culminated in a wrestling match or series of matches.

== Results ==
No.	Results	Stipulations	Times
1	Bully Ray and The Briscoes (Jay Briscoe and Mark Briscoe) defeated The Kingdom (Matt Taven, T. K. O'Ryan and Vinny Marseglia)	Six-man tag team match Winners receive an ROH World Six-Man Tag Team Championship match later in the show	12:08
2	Marty Scurll defeated Chuckie T.	Singles match	12:07
3	Punishment Martinez defeated Jay White	Las Vegas Street Fight	13:46
4	The Hung Bucks (The Young Bucks and Hangman Page) (c) defeated Bully Ray and The Briscoes (Jay Briscoe and Mark Briscoe)	Six-man tag team match for the ROH World Six-Man Tag Team Championship	5:06
5	Kenny King defeated Kushida (c)	Singles match for the ROH World Television Championship	16:25
6	Silas Young (with Beer City Bruiser) defeated Jay Lethal	Last Man Standing match	21:20
7	The Motor City Machine Guns (Alex Shelley and Chris Sabin) defeated The Young Bucks (Matt Jackson and Nick Jackson) (c)	Tag team match for the ROH World Tag Team Championship	15:43
8	Cody (c) (with Brandi Rhodes) defeated Minoru Suzuki	Singles match for the ROH World Championship	12:30
(c) / – the champion(s) heading into the match

== See also ==
- 2017 in professional wrestling
- List of Ring of Honor pay-per-view events
