= NXT TakeOver: Brooklyn III =

2017 WWE Network event

- Promotional poster featuring Bobby Roode, Drew McIntyre, Asuka, and Ember Moon
- Promotion: WWE
- Brand: NXT
- Date: August 19, 2017
- City: Brooklyn, New York
- Venue: Barclays Center
- Attendance: 15,275

WWE event chronology
← Previous; Battleground	Next → SummerSlam

NXT TakeOver chronology
← Previous; Chicago	Next → WarGames

NXT TakeOver: Brooklyn chronology
← Previous; II	Next → 4

NXT TakeOver: Brooklyn III was a 2017 professional wrestling livestreaming event produced by WWE, held exclusively for wrestlers from the promotion's developmental brand, NXT. It was the 16th NXT TakeOver event and the third annual TakeOver: Brooklyn. It took place on August 19, 2017, at the Barclays Center in Brooklyn, New York and aired exclusively on the WWE Network. The event was held as part of that year's SummerSlam weekend, and was the third of four consecutive TakeOver: Brooklyn events to take place at the arena.

Five matches were contested at the event. In the main event, Drew McIntyre defeated Bobby Roode to win the NXT Championship. On the undercard, Asuka retained the NXT Women's Championship against Ember Moon, which was also Asuka's last match in NXT, and Sanity (Alexander Wolfe and Eric Young) defeated The Authors of Pain (Akam and Rezar) to win the NXT Tag Team Championship. The event is notable for the debut of Adam Cole and the reunion of the team reDRagon after both members Bobby Fish and Kyle O'Reilly made individual debuts on NXT. reDRagon attacked both teams in the tag team championship match after Sanity's victory, then confronted Drew McIntyre during his celebration to serve as a distraction for Cole, who ambushed McIntyre from behind to end the show.

== Production ==
=== Background ===
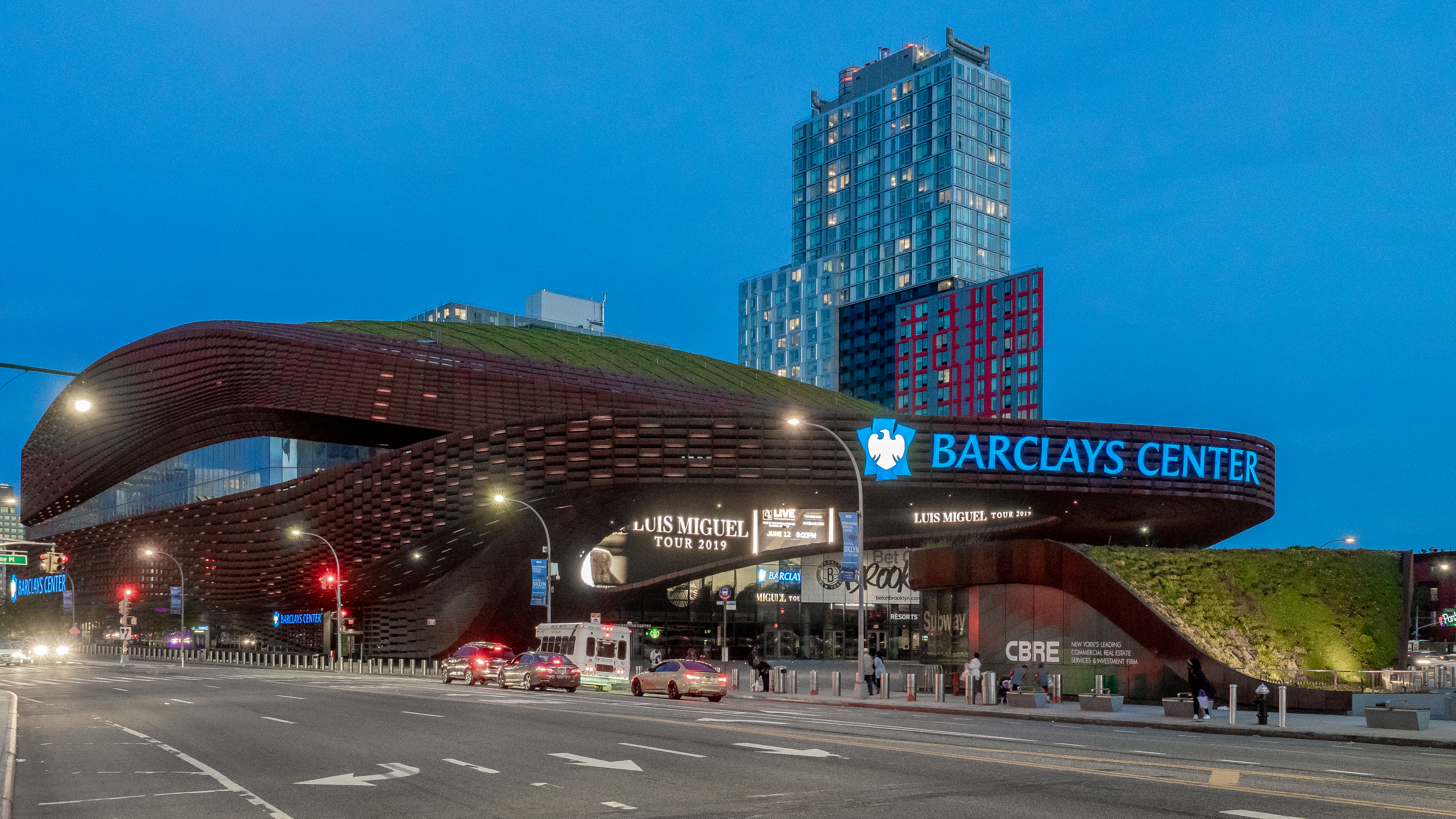
The 16th NXT TakeOver event was the third annual TakeOver: Brooklyn held at the Barclays Center in Brooklyn, New York.

TakeOver was a series of professional wrestling events that began in May 2014, as WWE's developmental brand, NXT, held its second WWE Network-exclusive livestreaming event, billed as TakeOver. The "TakeOver" moniker subsequently became the branding for all of NXT's major events held periodically throughout the year. TakeOver: Brooklyn was an annual subseries of TakeOver events that began in 2015 and were held at the Barclays Center in Brooklyn, New York as a support show for WWE's annual SummerSlam for the main roster at the same venue. Announced on September 28, 2015, Brooklyn III was scheduled as the 16th TakeOver event and was held on Saturday, August 19, 2017, as a support show for that year's SummerSlam. Tickets went on sale on June 9 through Ticketmaster.

=== Storylines ===
The card included matches that resulted from scripted storylines. Results were predetermined by WWE's writers on the NXT brand, while storylines were produced on WWE's weekly television program, NXT.

== Event ==
Other on-screen personnel
Role:	Name:
Commentators	Mauro Ranallo
Commentators	Nigel McGuinness
Commentators	Percy Watson
Commentators	Corey Graves (Tag Team Championship match)
Commentators	Jim Ross (Black/Itami match)
Ring announcer	Mike Rome
Referees	Darryl Sharma
Referees	Drake Wuertz
Referees	Eddie Orengo
Pre-show panel	Charly Caruso
Pre-show panel	Sam Roberts
Pre-show panel	Corey Graves
Pre-show panel	Lita

In the opening match, Andrade Cien Almas faced Johnny Gargano. In the end, Zelina Vega threw a #DIY shirt at Gargano, allowing Almas to perform a shotgun dropkick and a hammerlock DDT on Gargano for the win.

Next, The Authors of Pain (Akam and Rezar) defended the NXT Tag Team Championship against Sanity (Alexander Wolfe and Killian Dain). During the match, Eric Young replaced Dain as a legal participant. In the climax, Dain performed a running crossbody through a table on Akam, who was holding Nikki Cross. Wolfe and Young performed a belly to back suplex/diving neckbreaker combination on Rezar to win the titles, thus ending the Authors of Pain's undefeated streak since their debut. After the match, Bobby Fish and Kyle O'Reilly attacked Sanity and The Authors of Pain, performing "Chasing The Dragon" and "Total Elimination" on Young.

After that, Aleister Black faced Hideo Itami. Black performed "Black Mass" on Itami to win the match.

Later, Asuka defended the NXT Women's Championship against Ember Moon. Moon performed the "Eclipse" on Asuka for a near-fall. Asuka forced Moon to submit to the "Asuka Lock" to retain the title.

=== Main event ===
In the main event, Bobby Roode defended the NXT Championship against Drew McIntyre. McIntyre performed a "Future Shock" on Roode for a near-fall. McIntyre performed a "Claymore" on Roode, who placed his foot on the bottom rope to void the pinfall at a two count. Roode performed a "Glorious DDT" on McIntyre for a near-fall. Roode performed a second "Glorious DDT" on McIntyre and attempted a third "Glorious DDT" but McIntyre countered. McIntyre performed a Glasgow Kiss and a second "Claymore" on Roode to win the title and to give Roode his first televised loss in NXT. After the match, reDRagon appeared and distracted McIntyre. Adam Cole, making his debut, attacked McIntyre along with reDRagon and performed a superkick on McIntyre. Cole hoisted the NXT Championship as the event ended.

== Aftermath ==
On the August 22 episode of SmackDown Live, Bobby Roode made his main roster debut as a face, defeating Aiden English. On August 24, Asuka relinquished the NXT Women's Championship due to a collarbone injury sustained during her match with Moon, thus ending her record-breaking reign. Her reign lasted 510 days (WWE recognizes her reign as lasting 523 days due to the episode airing on tape delay on September 6, 2017). On the September 11 episode of Raw, a video promo aired announcing Asuka's main roster debut.

== Results ==
No.	Results	Stipulations	Times
1^{N}	Peyton Royce (with Billie Kay) defeated Sarah Logan by pinfall	Singles match	4:17
2^{N}	Pete Dunne and Wolfgang defeated Moustache Mountain (Tyler Bate and Trent Seven) by pinfall	Tag team match	7:07
3	Andrade "Cien" Almas (with Zelina Vega) defeated Johnny Gargano by pinfall	Singles match	13:13
4	Sanity (Alexander Wolfe and Eric Young) (with Killian Dain and Nikki Cross) defeated The Authors of Pain (Akam and Rezar) (c) (with Paul Ellering) by pinfall	Tag team match for the NXT Tag Team Championship	12:04
5	Aleister Black defeated Hideo Itami by pinfall	Singles match	12:24
6	Asuka (c) defeated Ember Moon by submission	Singles match for the NXT Women's Championship	14:50
7	Drew McIntyre defeated Bobby Roode (c) by pinfall	Singles match for the NXT Championship	22:25
(c) / – the champion(s) heading into the match; N / – the match was taped for a future broadcast of NXT
