= SummerSlam (2017) =

WWE pay-per-view and livestreaming event

- Promotional poster featuring various WWE wrestlers
- Promotion: WWE
- Brand(s): Raw; SmackDown
- Date: August 20, 2017
- City: Brooklyn, New York
- Venue: Barclays Center
- Attendance: 16,128

WWE event chronology
← Previous; NXT TakeOver: Brooklyn III	Next → Mae Young Classic Finale

SummerSlam chronology
← Previous; 2016	Next → 2018

The 2017 SummerSlam was a professional wrestling pay-per-view (PPV) and livestreaming event produced by WWE, held for wrestlers from the promotion's main roster brands, Raw and SmackDown. It was the 30th annual SummerSlam and took place on August 20, 2017, at the Barclays Center in the New York City borough of Brooklyn, New York. This was the third of four consecutive SummerSlam events to take place at the arena.

Thirteen matches were contested at the event, including three on the Kickoff pre-show. The event featured eight championship matches, the most for a SummerSlam event, where five of the titles changed hands. In the main event, Brock Lesnar defeated Braun Strowman, Roman Reigns, and Samoa Joe in a fatal four-way match to retain Raw's Universal Championship and in the penultimate match, Jinder Mahal defeated Shinsuke Nakamura to retain SmackDown's WWE Championship. In other prominent matches, AJ Styles defeated Kevin Owens to retain SmackDown's United States Championship in a match that featured Shane McMahon as the special guest referee, Dean Ambrose and Seth Rollins defeated Cesaro and Sheamus to win the Raw Tag Team Championship, and Sasha Banks defeated Alexa Bliss to win her record-tying fourth Raw Women's Championship. This was also the first SummerSlam to feature matches for the SmackDown Women's Championship, the SmackDown Tag Team Championship, and Raw's WWE Cruiserweight Championship.

== Production ==
=== Background ===
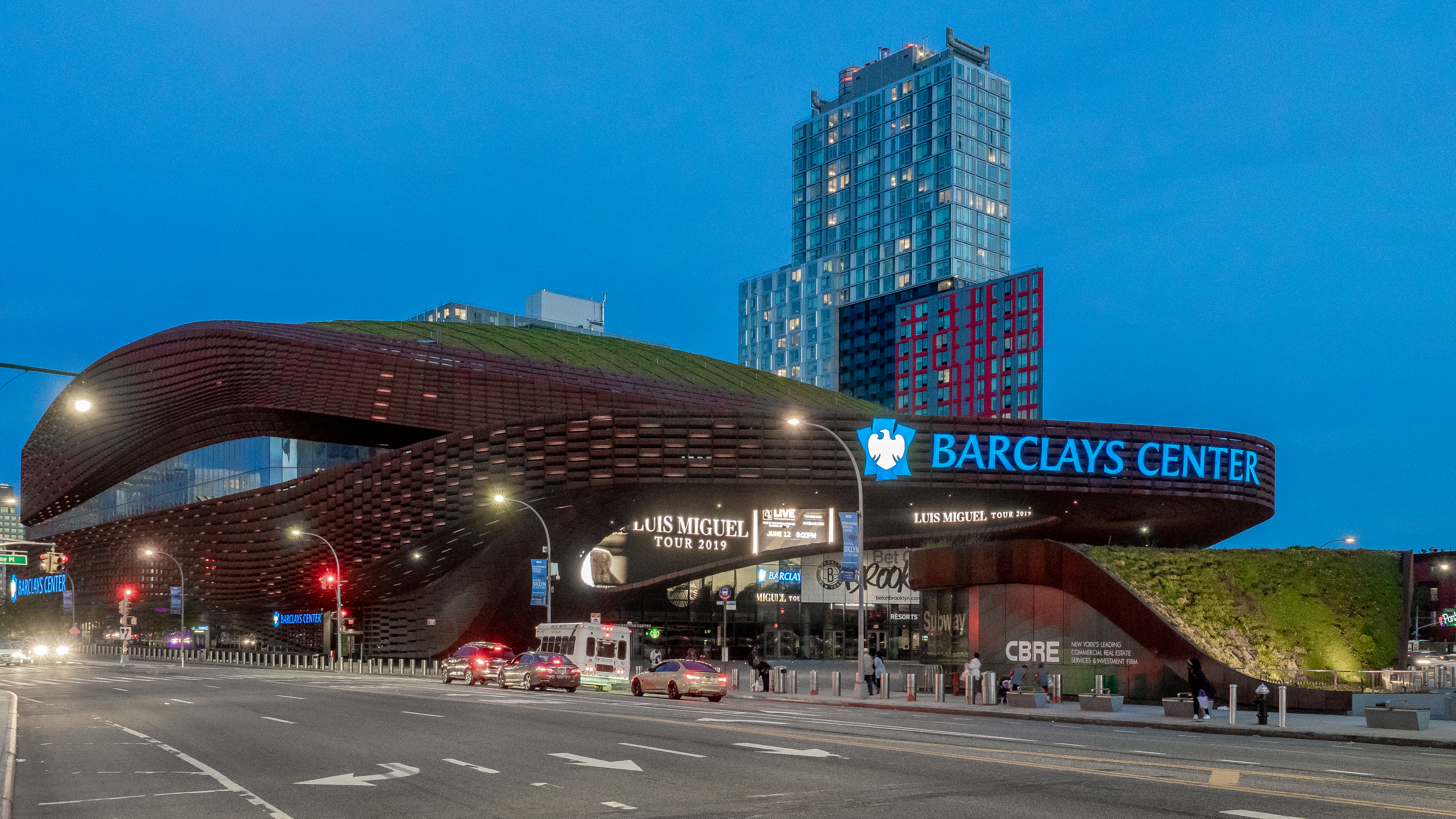
The 30th annual SummerSlam was the third of four consecutive SummerSlams to be held at the Barclays Center in Brooklyn, New York.

SummerSlam is an annual professional wrestling event produced every August by WWE since 1988. It was originally broadcast exclusively via pay-per-view (PPV) before it began simultaneously livestreaming on the WWE Network in 2014. Dubbed "The Biggest Party of the Summer", it is one of the promotion's original four PPVs, along with WrestleMania, Royal Rumble, and Survivor Series, referred to as the "Big Four". It has since become considered WWE's second biggest event of the year behind WrestleMania. Announced on September 28, 2015, the 30th SummerSlam was scheduled to be held on August 20, 2017, at the Barclays Center in the New York City borough of Brooklyn, New York for the third consecutive year and featured wrestlers from the Raw and SmackDown brand divisions. Tickets went on sale on March 25 through Ticketmaster.

=== Storylines ===
The event comprised 13 matches, including three on the Kickoff pre-show, that resulted from scripted storylines. Results were predetermined by WWE's writers on the Raw and SmackDown brands, while storylines were produced on WWE's weekly television shows, Monday Night Raw, SmackDown Live, and the cruiserweight-exclusive 205 Live.

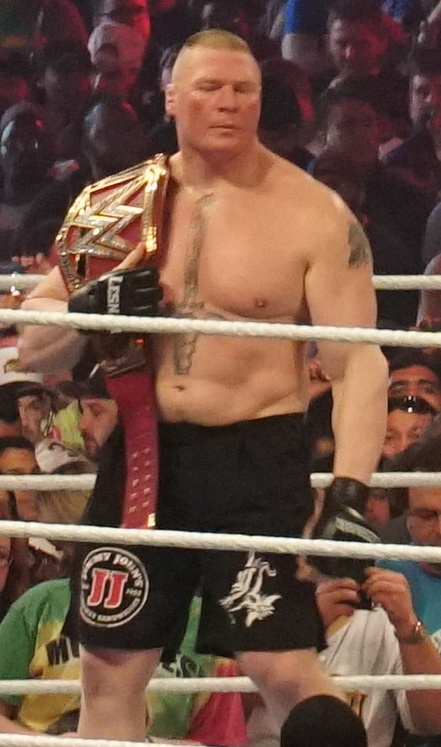
Brock Lesnar had to defend Raw's Universal Championship against Roman Reigns, Braun Strowman, and Samoa Joe in a fatal four-way match; Lesnar's advocate Paul Heyman proclaimed that had Lesnar lost, they both would have left WWE.

On the June 19 episode of Raw, Roman Reigns proclaimed himself to be the number one contender for the Universal Championship at SummerSlam. Later that night, Braun Strowman returned and cost Reigns his match against Samoa Joe and challenged Reigns to an ambulance match at Great Balls of Fire. At the event, Strowman defeated Reigns, but Reigns retaliated by locking Strowman in the ambulance and crashing it, leaving him bloodied and injured, while Brock Lesnar defeated Joe to retain the Universal Championship. The following night on Raw, as Raw General Manager Kurt Angle was about to reveal his plans for Lesnar's championship match at SummerSlam, Reigns interrupted, wanting the match. Joe then came out, wanting a rematch. Reigns and Joe were then scheduled for a number one contender match. During the match, Strowman returned and attacked both Reigns and Joe, resulting in a no contest. It was then decided that Lesnar would defend the title against Reigns, Joe, and Strowman in a fatal four-way match at SummerSlam. The following week, Heyman proclaimed that if Lesnar were to lose the Universal Championship at SummerSlam, then he and Lesnar would leave WWE.

At Battleground, Natalya won a fatal five-way elimination match to become the number one contender for Naomi's SmackDown Women's Championship at SummerSlam.

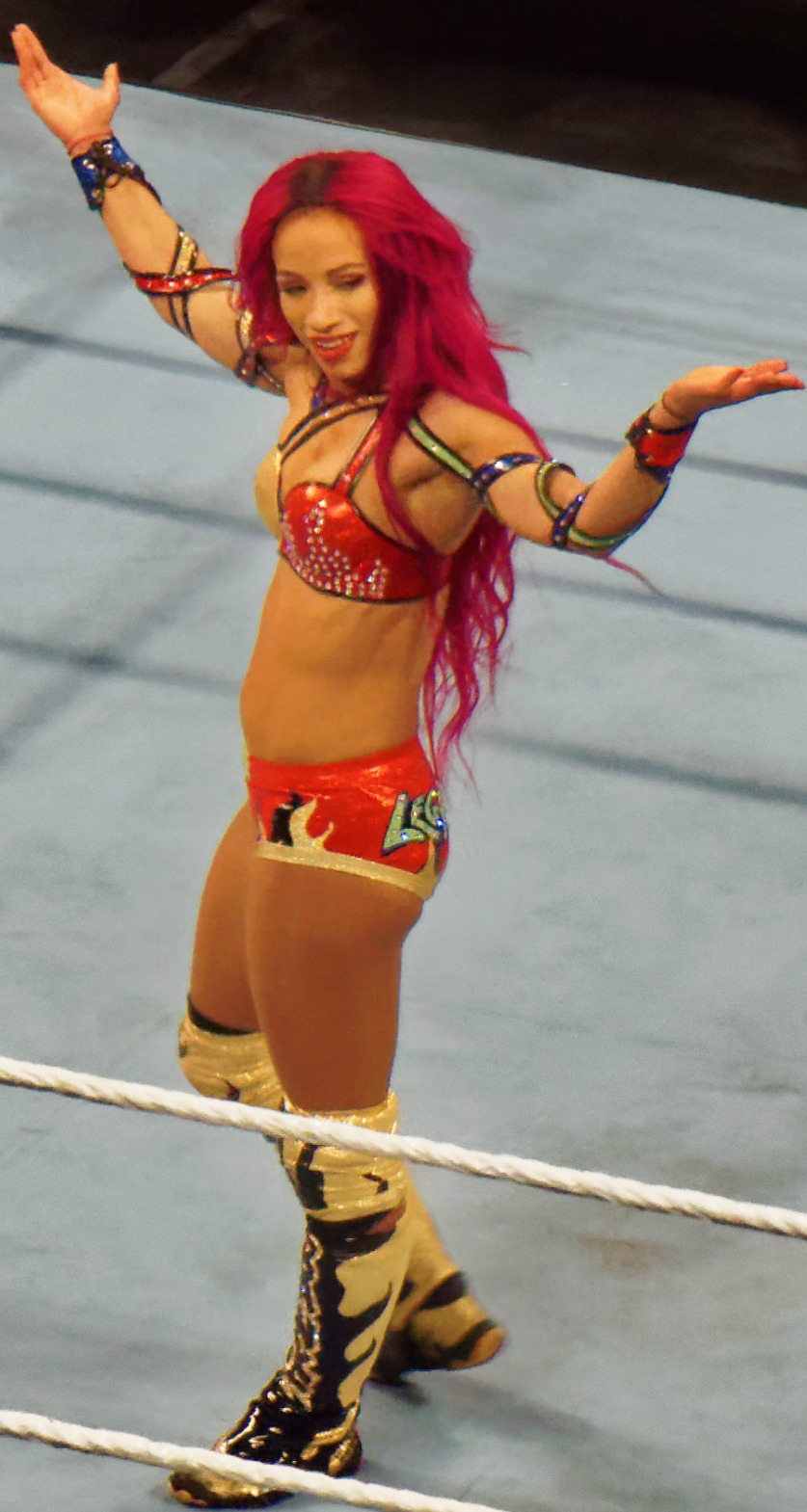
Sasha Banks had lost a number one contendership match to Bayley, but after Bayley got injured, Banks defeated Nia Jax to become the new number one contender for the Raw Women's Championship at SummerSlam.

At Great Balls of Fire, Sasha Banks defeated Alexa Bliss by count-out, thus Bliss retained the Raw Women's Championship. Over the next couple of weeks, Bayley scored pins over Bliss in a tag team match, and a non-title singles match. Bayley in turn felt she deserved a title shot, while Banks felt she deserved a rematch due to Bliss' actions at Great Balls of Fire. A number one contender's match between the two the following week was won by Bayley. Bayley then suffered a legitimate shoulder injury, incurred during a match with Nia Jax, forcing her to relinquish her number one contender's spot. Two triple threat matches were then scheduled for the following episode of Raw with the winner of each facing each other to determine the new number one contender for the Raw Women's Championship. Banks won the first triple threat match by defeating Alicia Fox and Emma, while Jax won the second by defeating Dana Brooke and Mickie James. The following week, Banks defeated Jax to become the new number one contender against Bliss at SummerSlam.

At Battleground, Jinder Mahal defeated Randy Orton in a Punjabi Prison match to retain the WWE Championship with help from The Singh Brothers and the return of The Great Khali. On the following episode of SmackDown, Mahal demanded a new opponent for SummerSlam. John Cena came out, congratulated Mahal, and then challenged him for the WWE Championship at SummerSlam. However, SmackDown General Manager Daniel Bryan said Cena had to earn his opportunity and scheduled a number one contender's match between Cena and Shinsuke Nakamura. The following week, Nakamura defeated Cena to become the number one contender for the WWE Championship at SummerSlam.

On the Great Balls of Fire Kickoff pre-show, Neville defeated Akira Tozawa to retain the WWE Cruiserweight Championship. On the July 31 episode of Raw, a number one contender's match was scheduled between Tozawa and Ariya Daivari for the following night's 205 Live with the winner facing Neville for the Cruiserweight Championship at SummerSlam. On 205 Live, Tozawa defeated Daivari to become the number one contender. On the August 14 episode of Raw, Tozawa received his title match early and defeated Neville to become the new Cruiserweight Champion, and their originally scheduled SummerSlam match was made a rematch with Neville as the challenger. On August 16, WWE confirmed that the match would take place on the SummerSlam Kickoff pre-show.

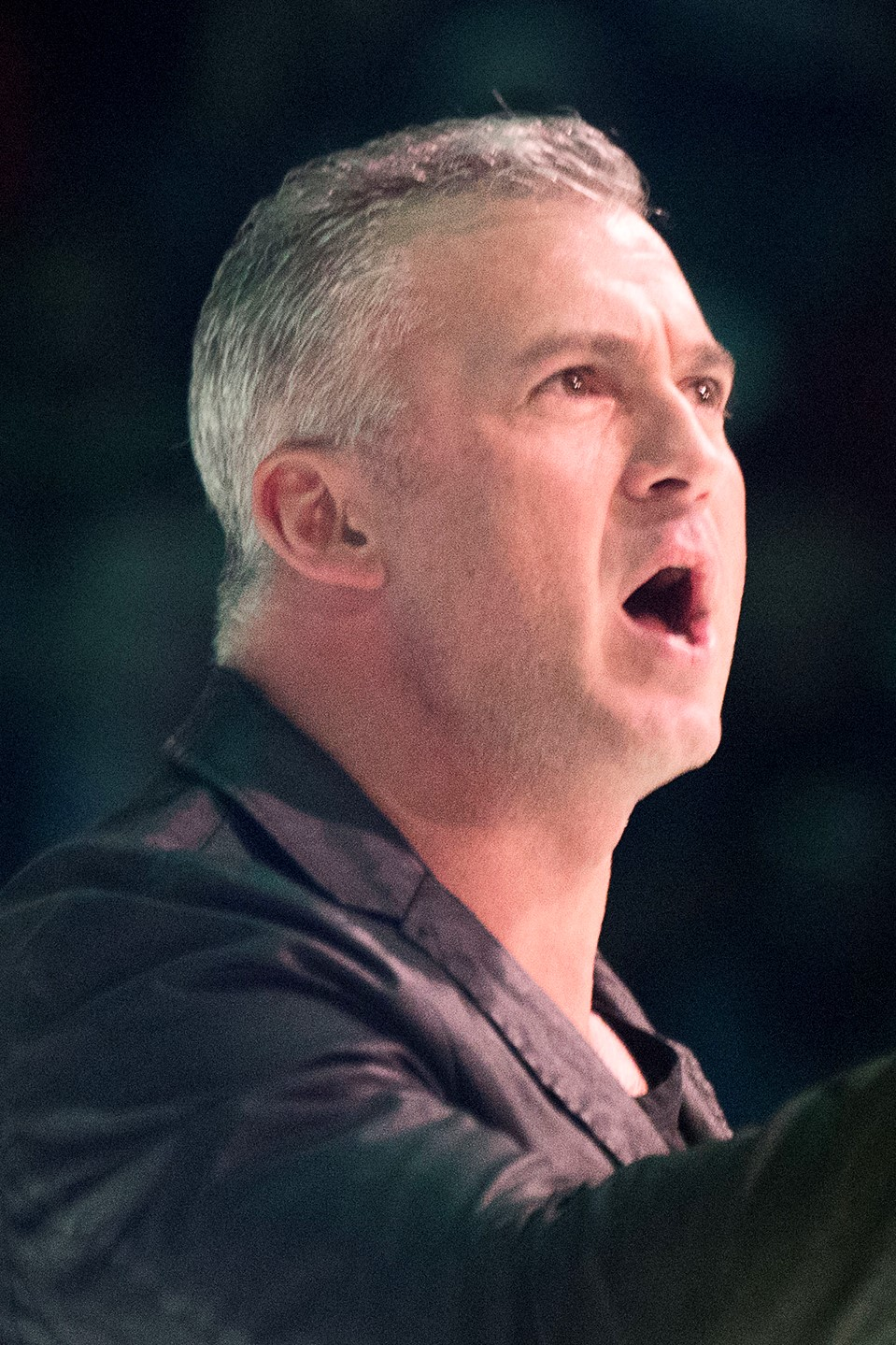
SmackDown's commissioner Shane McMahon was involved in the feud between AJ Styles and Kevin Owens, and was named the special guest referee for Styles and Owens's match at SummerSlam.

At Battleground, Kevin Owens defeated AJ Styles to win his third United States Championship. On the following episode of SmackDown, Styles wanted to invoke his championship rematch, but he was interrupted by the returning Chris Jericho, who also wanted to invoke his rematch from when he lost the title to Owens back in May. As both Styles and Jericho were contractually owed rematches, SmackDown Commissioner Shane McMahon decided that they would both get their rematches for the title in a triple threat match that night against Owens, where Styles pinned Jericho to regain the title. After the match, Owens invoked his championship rematch for the following week. During the rematch that episode, Owens attacked the referee, but lost even though both shoulders were not on the mat. A frustrated Owens confronted Shane and SmackDown General Manager Daniel Bryan and demanded a rematch, but with a competent referee. Bryan scheduled the rematch for SummerSlam and made Shane the special guest referee.

On the August 1 episode of SmackDown, Rusev issued a SummerSlam "Open Challenge" to any wrestler on the SmackDown roster. Randy Orton, who Rusev had never defeated, accepted the challenge before attacking Rusev with an RKO.

At Battleground, The New Day (Kofi Kingston and Xavier Woods, with Big E) defeated The Usos (Jey Uso and Jimmy Uso) to win the SmackDown Tag Team Championship. On the following episode of SmackDown, as The New Day were about to make their entrance to celebrate their championship win, they were attacked by The Usos. The following week, The Usos proclaimed that they would reclaim the titles from The New Day, and a rematch was scheduled for SummerSlam. On the final SmackDown before SummerSlam, SmackDown General Manager Daniel Bryan confirmed that The Usos would be facing Big E and Woods with Kingston in their corner. On August 16, WWE confirmed that the match would take place on the SummerSlam Kickoff pre-show.

At Great Balls of Fire, Big Cass defeated Enzo Amore. Amore and Cass then had a rematch on the July 24 episode of Raw that Cass again won. Cass continued to attack Amore after the match, after which, Big Show came out for the save, but Cass also laid him out. The following week, Cass defeated Big Show by disqualification after Amore attacked Cass during the match. After Cass gave a big boot to Amore, Big Show performed the KO Punch on Cass. On the August 7 episode, Luke Gallows and Karl Anderson defeated Amore and Big Show after a distraction from Cass, and a brawl broke out between the three. Later, Cass confronted Raw General Manager Kurt Angle, wanting a match against Big Show at SummerSlam, but with Amore banned from the entire state of New York. Angle suggested to suspend Amore above the ring inside of a shark cage. Cass agreed and the match was scheduled for SummerSlam.

On the July 17 episode of Raw, as Finn Bálor was making his way to the backstage after his match with Elias, Bray Wyatt appeared on the TitanTron. He said that he enjoyed Bálor's pain and that he was Bálor's worst nightmare. The following week, Wyatt cost Bálor his no disqualification match against Elias by giving Bálor the Sister Abigail. On the July 31 episode, as Wyatt cut an in-ring promo, the lights started blinking red and then went out. When they came back on, Bálor appeared in the ring and attacked Wyatt. The following week, as Bálor cut a promo about Wyatt, the lights in the arena went out and Wyatt appeared in the center of the ring. He and Bálor fought briefly before the lights went out again and Wyatt appeared on the TitanTron laughing at Bálor. Afterwards, it was announced that a match between Bálor and Wyatt was scheduled for SummerSlam. The following week, after a confrontation earlier in the night, Raw General Manager Kurt Angle moved their SummerSlam match up to that night where Wyatt defeated Bálor. After the match, Wyatt poured a blood-like liquid on Bálor. A rematch between the two was scheduled for SummerSlam where Bálor promised to bring his Demon King persona.

On the July 25 episode of SmackDown, Shinsuke Nakamura defeated Mr. Money in the Bank Baron Corbin. After the August 1 episode, on the WWE Network, Corbin attacked Nakamura from behind after Nakamura's match with John Cena to determine the number one contender for Jinder Mahal's WWE Championship at SummerSlam, which Nakamura won. Cena came to Nakamura's aid and performed an Attitude Adjustment on Corbin through the announcers table. The following week, SmackDown General Manager Daniel Bryan scheduled a match between Corbin and Cena at SummerSlam. On the final SmackDown before SummerSlam, Corbin attacked Cena during the latter's non-title match against Mahal, causing a disqualification. Afterwards, Corbin cashed in his Money in the Bank contract, but when the match started, he attacked Cena, who was on the apron, allowing Mahal to roll-up Corbin for the victory.

Throughout July and August 2017, Dean Ambrose and Seth Rollins teased a potential and partial Shield reunion for several weeks with both men sticking their fists out for the other for The Shield's signature fist bump, but both would decline each week, primarily due to trust issues from Rollins' betrayal three years prior. On the July 31 episode of Raw, Rollins was confronted by Cesaro and Sheamus and later won a match against Sheamus. After the match, Cesaro and Sheamus attacked Rollins before Ambrose came down to make the save. Backstage, Ambrose told Rollins that he would not help him if Rollins got outnumbered again. The following week, after Rollins lost a rematch against Sheamus and was once again attacked after the match, Ambrose did not help him. Later that night, Ambrose defeated Cesaro and was subsequently attacked by the duo before being saved by Rollins. Ambrose then displayed signs of trust by offering the Shield fist bump, but Rollins ultimately declined. Finally, on the August 14 episode of Raw, although both Ambrose and Rollins got into a physical altercation earlier in the night, the two came together to fight off Cesaro and Sheamus and both reciprocated the fist bump and reunited. Immediately afterwards, Raw General Manager Kurt Angle came out and scheduled a match between Cesaro and Sheamus and Ambrose and Rollins for the Raw Tag Team Championship at SummerSlam.

On the May 29 episode of Raw, Raw commentator Corey Graves received a text message concerning Raw General Manager Kurt Angle and Angle said that the contents of the message could ruin him. Over the next few weeks, both Angle and Graves received the same text messages concerning this private matter. On the July 10 episode of Raw, Graves confronted Angle about what he was going to do. Angle said that he would go public with it the following week and that he might lose his family, his career could be destroyed, and he might be saying goodbye to WWE. Graves was confident that Angle would be fine due to the love and respect from WWE's fans and everyone in the locker room. Later on the phone, Angle invited an unidentifiable person to come to Raw next week to discuss the matter and go public with it together. That episode, Angle revealed American Alpha's Jason Jordan as his (kayfabe) illegitimate son, and the newest member of the Raw brand, which subsequently disbanded American Alpha. The following week, Jordan defeated Curt Hawkins in his Raw debut match. Jordan was then the guest on "Miz TV". Intercontinental Champion The Miz offered Jordan a chance to join his Miztourage, but Jordan declined and Miz retaliated by stating that Jordan does not need his help since his father is the Raw General Manager. Jordan said that he did not want preferential treatment, and The Miz made some irritable comments about Angle. The Miz then took a swing at Jordan, but Jordan ducked and suplexed Miz into his Miztourage (Curtis Axel and Bo Dallas). On the August 14 episode of Raw, Jordan defeated The Miz by disqualification after the Miztourage attacked Jordan; The Hardy Boyz (Jeff Hardy and Matt Hardy) then ran out to even the odds by assisting Jordan in fending off the Miztourage. This led to a six-man tag team match later that night between The Miz and The Miztourage against The Hardy Boyz and Jordan, where the latter won. On August 17, WWE announced that The Miz and The Miztourage would be facing The Hardy Boyz and Jordan in a rematch on the SummerSlam Kickoff pre-show.

== Event ==
Other on-screen personnel
Role:	Name:
English commentators	Michael Cole (Raw)
English commentators	Corey Graves (Raw/Cruiserweight match)
English commentators	Booker T (Raw)
English commentators	Tom Phillips (SmackDown)
English commentators	John "Bradshaw" Layfield (SmackDown)
English commentators	Byron Saxton (SmackDown)
English commentators	Vic Joseph (Cruiserweight match)
Spanish commentators	Carlos Cabrera
Spanish commentators	Marcelo Rodríguez
Spanish commentators	Jerry Soto
German commentators	Carsten Schaefer
German commentators	Calvin Knie
Ring announcers	Greg Hamilton (SmackDown)
Ring announcers	JoJo (Raw)
Referees	Jason Ayers
Referees	Mike Chioda
Referees	John Cone
Referees	Dan Engler
Referees	Shane McMahon
Referees	Darrick Moore
Referees	Chad Patton
Referees	Ryan Tran
Referees	Rod Zapata
Interviewers	Charly Caruso
Interviewers	Dasha Fuentes
Interviewers	Kayla Braxton
Interviewers	Sam Roberts
Pre-show panel	Renee Young
Pre-show panel	Jerry Lawler
Pre-show panel	Lita
Pre-show panel	Peter Rosenberg
Pre-show panel	David Otunga

=== Pre-show ===
Three matches were contested on the SummerSlam Kickoff pre-show. In the first match, The Hardy Boyz (Jeff Hardy and Matt Hardy) and Jason Jordan faced Intercontinental Champion The Miz and The Miztourage (Curtis Axel and Bo Dallas). The Miz performed a "Skull Crushing Finale" on Jordan to win the match for his team.

After that, Akira Tozawa defended the WWE Cruiserweight Championship against Neville. Neville performed a "Red Arrow" on Tozawa to win his record second Cruiserweight Championship.

Finally, The New Day (Big E and Xavier Woods) defended the SmackDown Tag Team Championship against The Usos (Jey Uso and Jimmy Uso). Jey and Jimmy performed a double Samoan Splash on Big E to win the titles for a record-setting second time.

=== Preliminary matches ===
The actual pay-per-view opened with John Cena facing Baron Corbin. The entire match only featured one finisher, with Cena performing an "Attitude Adjustment" on Corbin to win the match. This was also Cena's first SummerSlam win since 2010.

Next, Naomi defended the SmackDown Women's Championship against Natalya. In the climax, as Naomi attempted a split-legged moonsault, Natalya raised her knees to counter. Natalya forced Naomi to submit to the Sharpshooter to win her first championship since 2010, as well as becoming the first wrestler to win the WWE Divas Championship and SmackDown Women's Championship.

After that, Big Cass faced Big Show, with Enzo Amore suspended above the ring inside a shark cage. Big Show performed a "KO Punch" on Cass for a near-fall. Big Show performed a chokeslam on Cass for another near-fall. Amore stripped to his underwear and applied oil on himself to escape the cage. As Amore escaped the cage, Cass performed a big boot on Amore. Cass then performed a big boot on Big Show for a near-fall. Cass performed a second big boot and an "Empire Elbow" on Big Show to win the match.

In the fourth match, Randy Orton faced Rusev. During Orton's entrance, Rusev attacked Orton. After the referee ruled Orton could compete, the match began. Orton quickly performed an "RKO" on Rusev to win in ten seconds.

After that, Alexa Bliss defended the Raw Women's Championship against Sasha Banks. Bliss dominated most of the match. Banks countered a DDT attempt by Bliss and applied the "Bank Statement", however, Bliss reached the ropes to void the submission. Bliss then pulled the ring apron, causing Banks to tumble out of the ring and injure her shoulder. Banks made it back to the ring before the ten-count, but Bliss went right back to the injured shoulder and followed up with "Twisted Bliss" on Banks for a nearfall. As Bliss attempted a DDT again, Banks countered into a "Bank Statement". Bliss countered it into a roll-up, but Banks kicked out and re-applied the hold to force Bliss to submit and win the title for a record-tying fourth time.

In the sixth match, "The Demon King" Finn Bálor faced Bray Wyatt. Bálor performed a "Coup De Grâce" on Wyatt to win the match.

In the seventh match, Cesaro and Sheamus defended the Raw Tag Team Championship against Dean Ambrose and Seth Rollins. During the match, the crowd were playing with a beach ball. Cesaro broke character and went into the crowd and tore up the ball. In the climax, as Sheamus and Cesaro attempted an assisted "White Noise" on Ambrose, Rollins performed a super hurricanrana on Cesaro into Sheamus. Rollins then performed superkicks on Cesaro and Sheamus, and performed a "Ripcord Knee" on Sheamus, which allowed Ambrose to perform "Dirty Deeds" on Sheamus to win the titles. This marked Ambrose's first reign and Rollins' second reign, individually. Ambrose became the first Shield member to be a Grand Slam Champion.

Next, AJ Styles defended the United States Championship against Kevin Owens, with Shane McMahon serving as special guest referee. During the match, as Shane checked on Owens, Styles performed a springboard 450° splash on Shane, who Owens had pulled on top of him. Owens performed a pop-up powerbomb on Styles for a delayed near-fall. Owens then began to argue with Shane. Styles attempted a "Calf Crusher" but Owens countered by kicking Styles into Shane. Styles forced Owens to submit to the "Calf Crusher", however, Shane was knocked out, which led to Styles arguing with Shane. Styles performed a "Styles Clash" on Owens for a near-fall. Owens performed a pop-up powerbomb on Styles, but Shane noticed Styles' foot on the ring ropes, voiding the pinfall at a two count. An irate Owens and Shane argued, with Shane shoving Owens. Styles rolled up Owens for a near-fall. In the climax, Styles performed a "Pele Kick", a "Phenomenal Forearm", and a second "Styles Clash" on Owens to retain the title.

In the penultimate match, Jinder Mahal (accompanied by The Singh Brothers) defended the WWE Championship against Shinsuke Nakamura. In the end, The Singh Brothers interfered, leading to Nakamura performing "Kinshasas" on both the brothers. As Nakamura was distracted, Mahal took advantage and performed the "Khallas" on Nakamura to retain the title.

=== Main event ===
In the main event, Brock Lesnar (with Paul Heyman) defended the WWE Universal Championship against Braun Strowman, Roman Reigns and Samoa Joe in a fatal four-way match, with the stipulation that should Lesnar lose the championship, he and Heyman would leave WWE. Early at ringside, Joe performed a Coquina Clutch on Lesnar and Reigns performed a Spear on Lesnar through the barricade in the timekeeper's area after Joe avoided it. Joe performed a Side Slam on Reigns on an announce table. Strowman performed a Running Powerslam on Lesnar through an announce table and threw a commentator's chair at Joe and Reigns. Strowman performed a second Running Powerslam on Lesnar through a second announce table and overturned the last one available on Lesnar. Medical personnel arrived and took Lesnar away. The match continued as a Triple Threat briefly. Strowman attacked Joe and Reigns with a steel steps, but Reigns attacked Strowman with the steps, taking him out of the ring and giving him a cut on the head. As Joe reversed a Superman Punch into a Coquina Clutch on Reigns, Strowman broke it. Strowman performed a Double Chokeslam on Joe and Reigns for a nearfall on the last. An angry Lesnar returned and performed a double leg takedown on Strowman. Lesnar punched repeatedly and clotheslined Strowman out of the ring. Lesnar performed German Suplexes on Reigns and Joe. Strowman returned, but Lesnar performed a Kimura Lock on him. However, Reigns performed Superman Punches on Strowman, Lesnar and Joe. Reigns performed a second Spear on Lesnar for a nearfall. As Joe performed a Coquina Clutch on Reigns, Strowman performed a Running Front Dropkick on Reigns, throwing Joe into a corner. Strowman performed a Running Powerslam on Joe, but Lesnar avoided a pinfall at a two count, taking the referee out of the ring. As Strowman performed a Running Powerslam on Reigns, Lesnar avoided a pinfall at a two count. As Strowman attempted a third Running Powerslam on Lesnar, Reigns performed a Spear on Strowman, taking Strowman out of the ring and saving Lesnar. Joe performed a second Coquina Clutch on Lesnar. As Lesnar reversed it into an F-5 on Joe, Reigns avoided a pinfall at a two count. In the climax, as Reigns performed three more Superman Punches and attempted a third Spear, Lesnar reversed it into an F-5 for a pinfall, retaining the WWE Universal Championship and staying with Heyman in WWE.

== Aftermath ==
=== Raw ===
On the following episode of Raw, Brock Lesnar and Paul Heyman came out to celebrate Lesnar retaining the Universal Championship. They were then interrupted by Braun Strowman, who attacked Lesnar with two Running Powerslams. Later, it was announced that Lesnar would defend the Universal Championship against Strowman at No Mercy. Later in the show, John Cena moved over to the Raw brand and was interrupted by Roman Reigns, and then The Miz (who was furious over being in the SummerSlam dark match and jealous about Cena & Reigns being more over than him) and Samoa Joe. Cena and Reigns later teamed up and defeated Joe and Miz. On August 28, Cena and Reigns were scheduled to face each other at No Mercy, and they signed the contract for the match on Raw that night.

Also on Raw, Jason Jordan wanted to face Finn Bálor. Raw General Manager Kurt Angle scheduled the match in which Bálor won. Both then participated in a battle royal to determine the number one contender for the Intercontinental Championship where Bray Wyatt caused Bálor's elimination, setting up a rematch for No Mercy.

Dean Ambrose and Seth Rollins came out to celebrate becoming the new Raw Tag Team Champions. They were then interrupted by The Hardy Boyz, who congratulated them and challenged them to a non-title match that Ambrose and Rollins won. Cesaro and Sheamus were then granted their championship rematch at No Mercy.

Sasha Banks came out to celebrate with the Raw Women's Championship. Alexa Bliss interrupted and invoked her rematch for the following week, where she regained the title, also continuing Banks' streak of losing in title defenses. Nia Jax congratulated Bliss, but then turned on her. The following week, Jax teamed up with Emma and defeated Bliss and Banks to make the No Mercy match a fatal four-way also involving Jax and Emma. Bayley then returned to make it a fatal five-way.

=== SmackDown ===
On the following episode of SmackDown, as retribution for The Singh Brothers costing Shinsuke Nakamura his WWE Championship match against Jinder Mahal, SmackDown General Manager Daniel Bryan scheduled Nakamura to face The Singh Brothers in a handicap match that Nakamura won. Afterwards, Mahal attacked Nakamura, but Nakamura countered with the Kinshasa. On the September 5 episode, Nakamura defeated Randy Orton to receive another chance at the WWE Championship at Hell in a Cell.

AJ Styles reinstated the U.S. Championship Open Challenge which was answered by Kevin Owens. Styles denied him since he beat Owens at SummerSlam, but Owens said that he was screwed by SmackDown Commissioner Shane McMahon. Shane came out and they reviewed scenes from the match. After a verbal confrontation, Styles agreed to the rematch and Shane allowed Owens to pick a special guest referee, but said this would be his last chance at the title. Owens picked Baron Corbin as the referee, but mid-match, Shane took over due to Corbin's poor performance and Styles retained. Owens, frustrated with Shane, began a feud with him, also involving Shane's father and WWE Chairman Mr. McMahon, where a Hell in a Cell match between Owens and Shane was scheduled for Hell in a Cell. The match later had an added stipulation of falls count anywhere.

New SmackDown Tag Team Champions The Usos defeated The Hype Bros (Zack Ryder and Mojo Rawley), after which, they made a warning to the entire SmackDown tag team division. The following week, they faced The New Day in a match where the winner chose the stipulation for The New Day's championship rematch. The Usos won and chose to face The New Day in a Street Fight on the September 12 episode, where The New Day regained the titles. Another rematch was scheduled for Hell in a Cell in the titular match.

New SmackDown Women's Champion Natalya said that she would restore dignity to the title. She then teamed up with Carmella in a losing effort against Naomi and Becky Lynch. The following week, Naomi informed Natalya that she would be invoking her championship rematch for the September 12 episode, where Natalya retained.

Rusev had a rematch with Randy Orton on the September 19 episode of SmackDown where Rusev, with the help from Aiden English, defeated Orton in 10 seconds. Another rematch was scheduled for Hell in a Cell, which Orton won.

=== 205 Live ===
On the following Raw, Big Cass faced Enzo Amore in a Brooklyn Street Fight, which Amore won as Cass suffered a legitimate leg injury during the match and could no longer compete. Amore was subsequently moved to the cruiserweight division on 205 Live.

On the following episode of 205 Live, Akira Tozawa received his rematch for Neville's WWE Cruiserweight Championship, but was unsuccessful.

== Results ==
No.	Results	Stipulations	Times
1^{P}	The Miz and The Miztourage (Bo Dallas and Curtis Axel) (with Maryse) defeated The Hardy Boyz (Jeff Hardy and Matt Hardy) and Jason Jordan by pinfall	Six-man tag team match	11:20
2^{P}	Neville defeated Akira Tozawa (c) (with Titus O'Neil) by pinfall	Singles match for the WWE Cruiserweight Championship	11:45
3^{P}	The Usos (Jey Uso and Jimmy Uso) defeated The New Day (Big E and Xavier Woods) (c) (with Kofi Kingston) by pinfall	Tag team match for the WWE SmackDown Tag Team Championship	19:20
4	John Cena defeated Baron Corbin by pinfall	Singles match	10:15
5	Natalya defeated Naomi (c) by submission	Singles match for the WWE SmackDown Women's Championship	11:10
6	Big Cass defeated Big Show by pinfall	Singles match Enzo Amore was suspended above the ring in a shark cage.	10:30
7	Randy Orton defeated Rusev by pinfall	Singles match	0:10
8	Sasha Banks defeated Alexa Bliss (c) by submission	Singles match for the WWE Raw Women's Championship	13:10
9	"The Demon" Finn Bálor defeated Bray Wyatt by pinfall	Singles match	10:40
10	Dean Ambrose and Seth Rollins defeated Cesaro and Sheamus (c) by pinfall	Tag team match for the WWE Raw Tag Team Championship	18:35
11	AJ Styles (c) defeated Kevin Owens by pinfall	Singles match for the WWE United States Championship; Shane McMahon was the special guest referee.	17:20
12	Jinder Mahal (c) (with The Singh Brothers) defeated Shinsuke Nakamura by pinfall	Singles match for the WWE Championship	11:25
13	Brock Lesnar (c) (with Paul Heyman) defeated Roman Reigns, Braun Strowman, and Samoa Joe by pinfall	Fatal four-way match for the WWE Universal Championship; Had Lesnar lost the title, he and Heyman would have left WWE.	20:51
(c) / – the champion(s) heading into the match; P / – the match was broadcast on the pre-show
