= Alex Windsor =

English professional wrestler (born 1993)

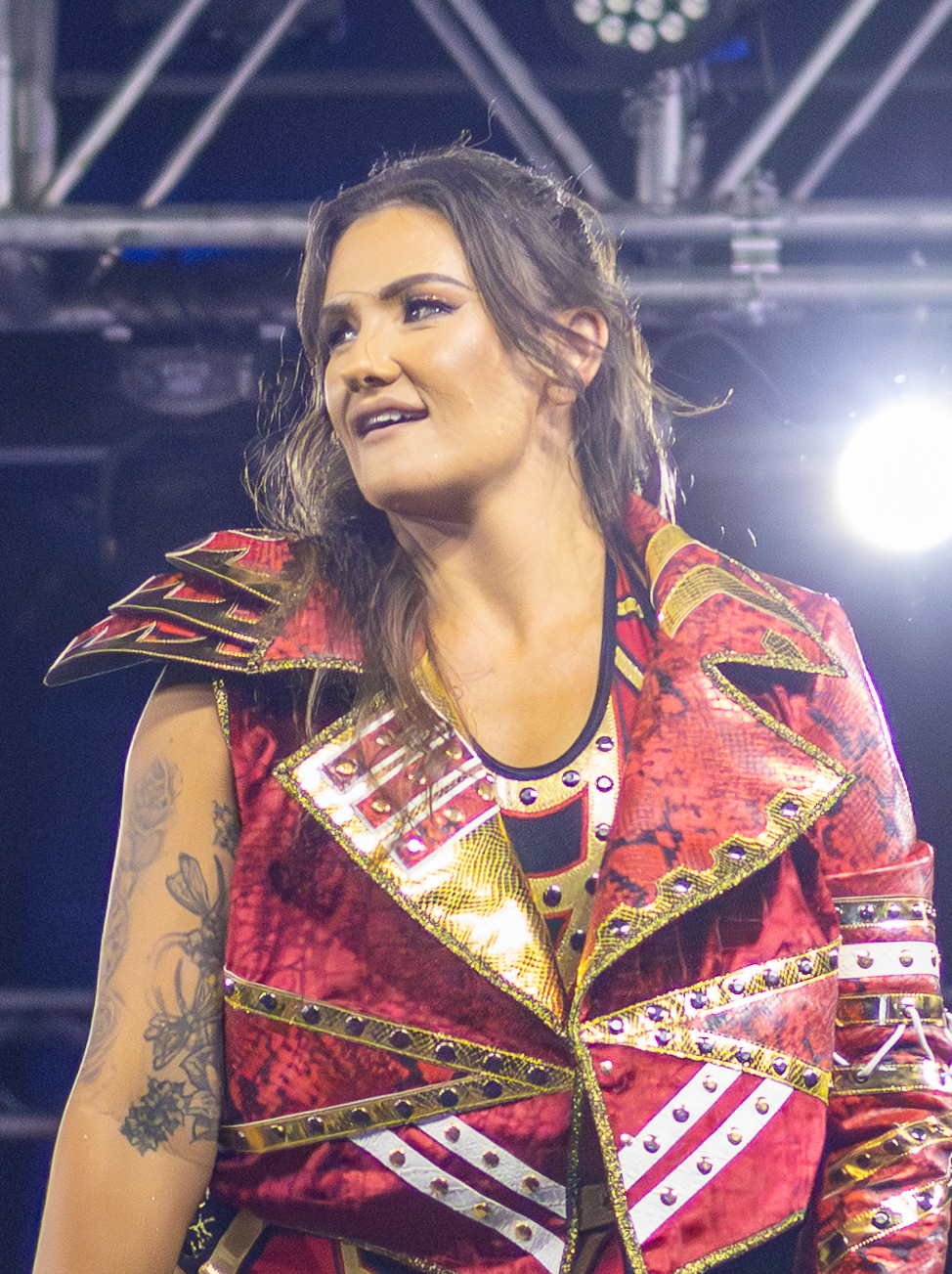
- Windsor in 2025

Personal information
- Born: Alice Olivia Walker; 9 November 1993 (age 33) Happisburgh, Norfolk, England
- Spouses: Ryan Smile (m. 2019; died 2020) Will Ospreay (m. 2026)
- Children: 1

Professional wrestling career
- Ring name(s): Liberty; Alex Windsor
- Billed height: 164 cm (5 ft 5 in)
- Billed weight: 63 kg (139 lb)
- Trained by: Jason Cross; Ricky Knight; Sweet Saraya; Zak Zodiac
- Debut: 2009

Alice Olivia Ospreay (née Walker; born 9 November 1993), better known by her ring name Alex Windsor, is an English professional wrestler. She is signed to All Elite Wrestling (AEW), where she is a member of United Empire and one-half of the tag team The Brawling Birds with Jamie Hayter. With whom, she is a former AEW Women's World Tag Team Champion.

Outside of AEW, she wrestles for various promotions in her native England such as Pro-Wrestling: EVE and Revolution Pro Wrestling (RevPro), where she is a two time Undisputed British Women's Champion. She also appears in AEW and RevPro partner promotion New Japan Pro-Wrestling (NJPW), where she is the NJPW Strong Women's Champion in her first reign.

== Early life ==
Alice Olivia Walker was born in Happisburgh on 9 November 1993.

== Professional wrestling career ==
=== British independent circuit (2009–present) ===
Walker began training to become a professional wrestler in 2009 under the tutelage of Jason Cross, Ricky Knight, Sweet Saraya, and Zak Knight. Her longest tenure with any company came with Pro-Wrestling: EVE, which she joined in 2010 and left in 2025. She made her debut at EVE/WAW Potentials, a joint event co-promoted alongside World Association of Wrestling on 14 November 2010, where she was defeated by Queen Maya. She made her first appearance in Progress Wrestling at Chapter 36 on 25 September 2016, where she teamed up with Dahlia Black and Jinny to defeat Laura Di Matteo, Nixon Newell, and Pollyanna in a Six-woman tag team match. She continued to make sporadic appearances and unsuccessfully challenged Toni Storm for the Progress Wrestling World Women's Championship at Chapter 58 on 26 November 2017.

During her years in Pro-Wrestling: EVE, Walker challenged for various championships. At Wrestle Queendom 4 on 27 August 2021, she participated in a 30-woman battle royal for the Pro-Wrestling: EVE Championship, which was won by Jetta. She made her debut in Revolution Pro Wrestling on 10 October 2021 at RevPro Live in Southampton 14, where she defeated Gisele Shaw. One month later at RevPro Live at the NOTpit 55 on 7 November 2021, she defeated Shaw for the Undisputed British Women's Championship in her second appearance for the company. Walker marked several notable successful defenses of the title, one of them being against Kylie Rae at RevPro Epic Encounter 2022 on 22 May. On 16 December, at Uprising 2023, she lost the title to Dani Luna. At EVE Slayers in Spandex 2 on 5 February 2022, she unsuccessfully faced Laura Di Matteo for the vacant Pro-Wrestling: EVE International Championship. At EVE God Save the Wrestle Queens on 3 June 2022, she teamed up with Charlie Morgan to unsuccessfully challenge The Uprising (Rhia O'Reilly and Skye Smitson) for the Pro-Wrestling: EVE Tag Team Championship. She defeated Jetta for the EVE Championship during the afternoon show of Wrestle Queendom 5 on 13 November 2022, but lost the title to Miyu Yamashita during the evening show.

On 6 June 2025 at EVE 135, Windsor unsuccessfully challenged Syuri for the IWGP Women's Championship. After the match, she announced that she would be signing with AEW. On 8 March 2026, at Pro-Wrestling: EVE's event Wrestle Queendom VIII, Windsor defeat Syuri to win the Strong Women's Championship.

=== Japanese promotions (2022–present) ===
Walker began competing in Japan in July 2022. In her debut, which took place on 9 July at Tokyo Joshi Pro Wrestling's Summer Sun Princess '22, she defeated Maki Itoh to win the International Princess Championship. She lost the title to Miu Watanabe three months later on 9 October 2022 at Wrestle Princess III. On the first night of New Japan Pro Wrestling's event Royal Quest II on 1 October, she teamed up with Ava White to defeat Jazzy Gabert and Kanji. On 8 March 2026, at Pro-Wrestling: EVE's event Wrestle Queendom VIII, Windsor defeat Syuri to win the Strong Women's Championship.

=== All Elite Wrestling (2024–present) ===
Windsor made her All Elite Wrestling (AEW) debut on 24 May 2024 episode of Rampage, teaming with Anna Jay in a losing effort to Kris Statlander and Willow Nightingale.

On 6 June 2025, Windsor announced that she had signed with AEW. On 26 June episode of Collision, a video package aired teasing Windsor's arrival in AEW. On 12 July at All In, Windsor wrestled her first match as an AEW talent, entering the women's Casino Gauntlet match, but failed to win. On 6 August episode of Dynamite, Windsor won a four-way match involving Billie Starkz, Queen Aminata and Skye Blue to advance to Forbidden Door on 24 August to compete in another four-way to challenge Mercedes Moné for the AEW TBS Championship, but failed to win the title at the event. On 20 December at Collision: Holiday Bash, Windsor answered Moné's open challenge for the Undisputed British Women's Championship and defeated her to win the title.

In 2026, AEW began airing vignettes that showed Windsor and Jamie Hayter forming a tag team known as "The Brawling Birds". At All In on 30 August, the Brawling Birds defeated Divine Dominion (Lena Kross and Megan Bayne) to win the AEW Women's World Tag Team Championship. On 26 September at All Out, the Brawling Birds successfully defended their titles against Divine Dominion in a Chicago Street Fight. That same night, the Brawling Birds joined the United Empire after assisting Windsor's real-life husband Will Ospreay fend off the Death Riders during his AEW World Championship defense. On 4 November, the Brawling Birds competed in a six-on-six Blood and Guts match at the namesake event, where their team was victorious. On November 14 at Full Gear, the Brawling Birds lost their titles to Wrathlander (Harley Cameron and Kris Statlander), ending their reign at 76 days.

== Personal life ==
She was married to fellow professional wrestler Ryan Smile, with whom she has one son. Smile died by suicide in 2020. In June 2025, Walker became engaged to marry Will Ospreay, also a fellow professional wrestler who was a close friend of Smile's. They got married a year later.

== Championships and accomplishments ==
- All Elite Wrestling
  - AEW Women's World Tag Team Championship (1 time) – with Jamie Hayter
- Bellatrix Female Warriors
  - Bellatrix World Championship (2 times)
  - Bellatrix European Championship (1 time)
  - Bellatrix British Championship (1 time)
- New Japan Pro-Wrestling
  - Strong Women's Championship (1 time, current)
- Pro Wrestling Illustrated
  - Ranked No. 24 of the top 150 female singles wrestlers in the PWI Women's 150 in 2022
- Pro-Wrestling: EVE
  - Pro-Wrestling: EVE Championship (1 time)
  - SHE-1 (2022)
- Revolution Pro Wrestling
  - Undisputed British Women's Championship (2 times)
- Tokyo Joshi Pro Wrestling
  - International Princess Championship (1 time)
- Wrestle Carnival
  - Queen of the Carnival Championship (1 time)
