= Kris Statlander =

American professional wrestler

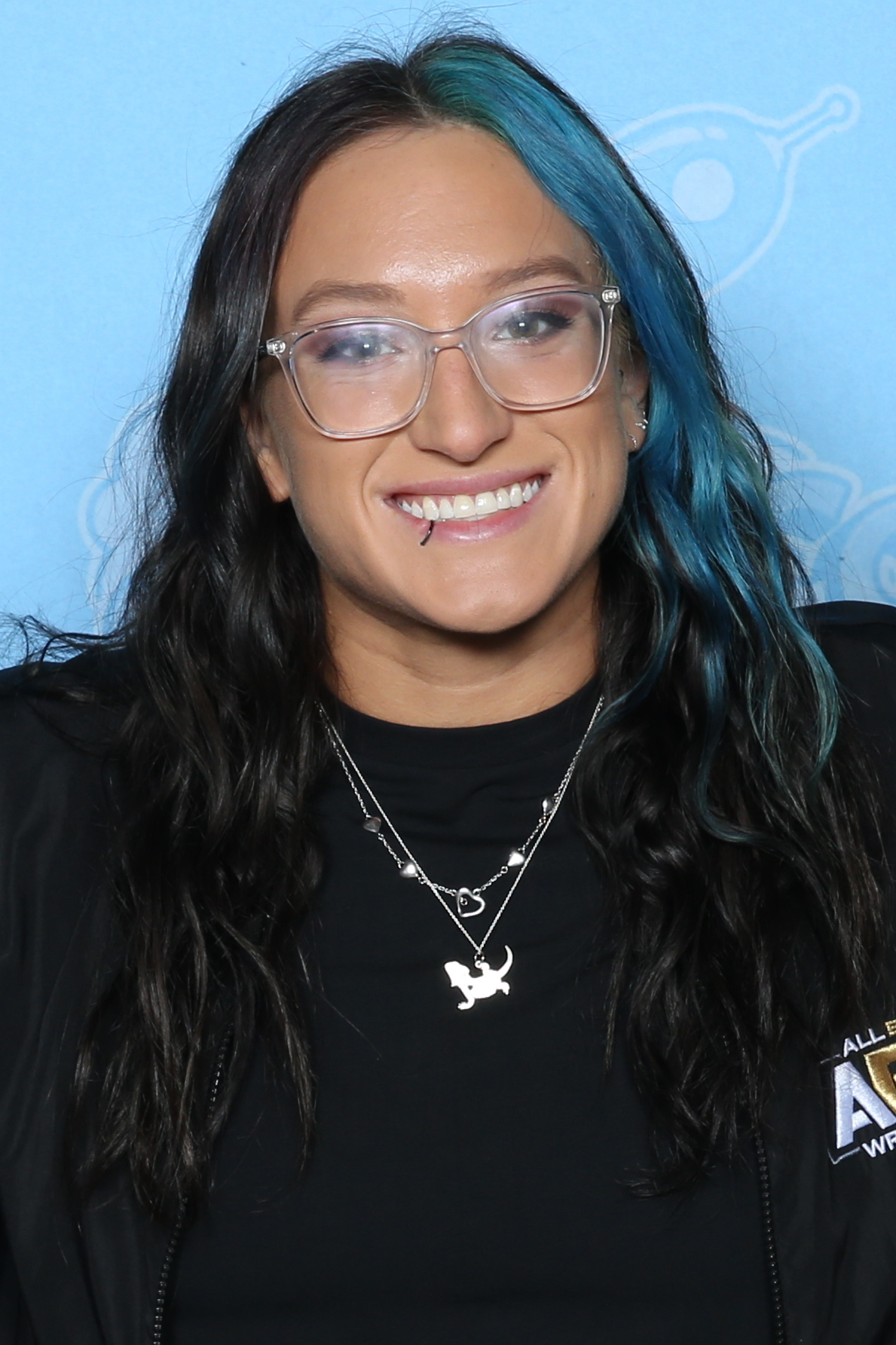
- Stadtlander in 2022

Personal information
- Born: Kristen Stadtlander; August 7, 1995 (age 31) West Islip, New York, U.S.

Professional wrestling career
- Ring names: Kris Stadtlander; Kris Statlander; Kristen; Liza Viero
- Billed from: "The Andromeda Galaxy"; Long Island, New York
- Trained by: Brian Myers; Pat Buck
- Debut: November 2016

Kristen Stadtlander (born August 7, 1995) is an American professional wrestler and stuntwoman. As of December 2019, she is signed to All Elite Wrestling (AEW), where she performs under her real name, stylized as Kris Statlander. She is currently one-half of the AEW Women's World Tag Team Champions with Harley Cameron as Wrathlander in their first reign as a team. She is also a former one-time AEW Women's World Champion and one-time AEW TBS Champion, making her the first woman to hold both of AEW's women's singles championships, and she is the second AEW Women's Triple Crown Champion.

== Early life ==
Kristen Stadtlander was born in the Long Island, New York suburb of West Islip. Her father is a car mechanic and her mother is a high school music teacher. She attended college in New Jersey, but left after one year to train as a stunt double at Hollywood Stunts in Brooklyn, New York.

== Professional wrestling career ==
=== Early career (2016–2019) ===
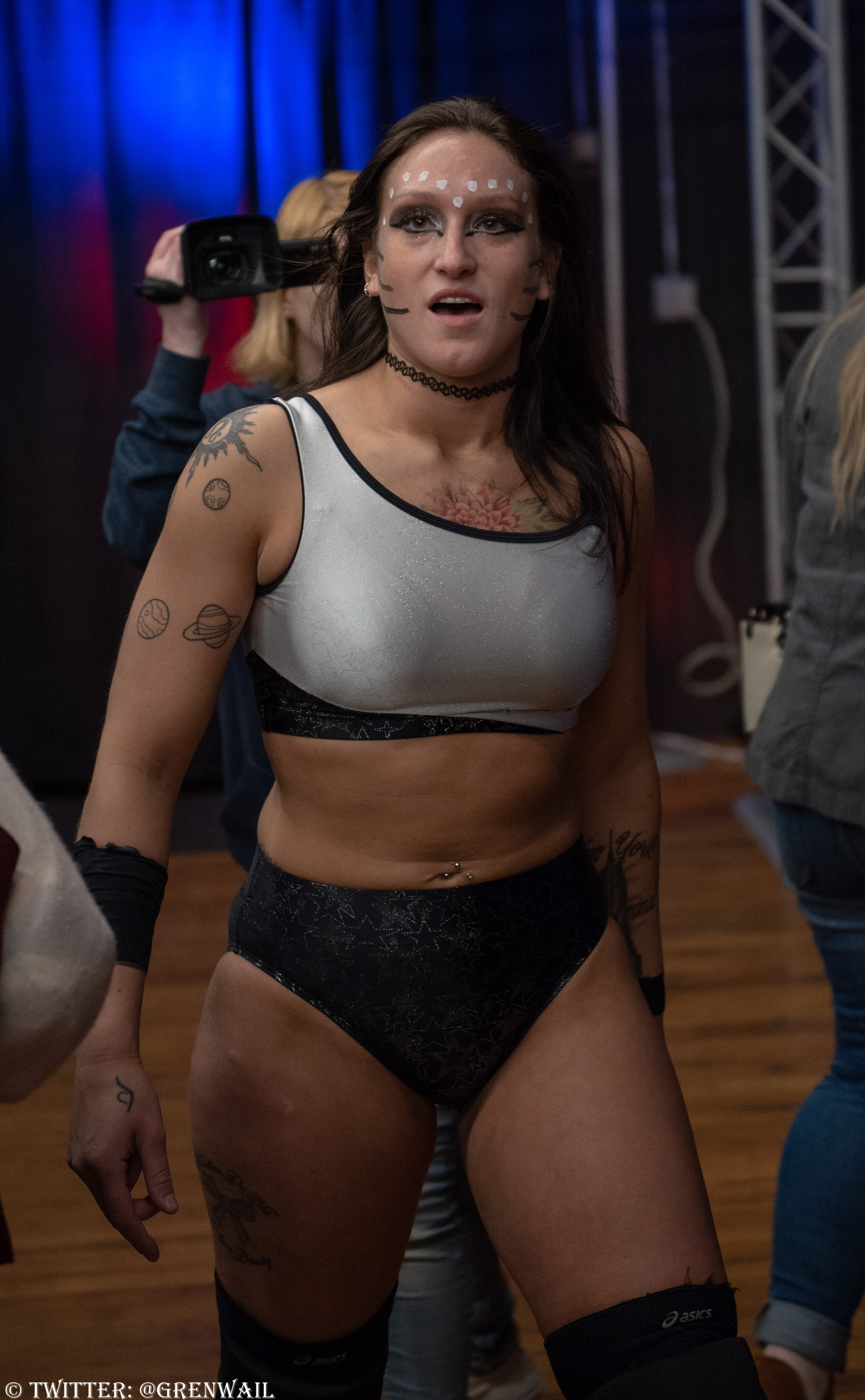
Statlander in February 2019

Statlander began her professional wrestling training under Pat Buck and Brian Myers at the Create A Pro Wrestling Academy in Hicksville, New York in 2016. Statlander later became the first female graduate of the academy. She made her professional wrestling debut in November 2016, initially under the ring name "Liza Viero". Statlander made an appearance for WWE on an episode of SmackDown Live that aired on April 9, 2019, teaming with Karissa, named "The Brooklyn Belles", in a losing effort against the then-WWE Women's Tag Team Champions Billie Kay and Peyton Royce. In June that same year, she competed at an event for the promotion Beyond Wrestling in an intergender match against Joey Janela in a losing effort.

=== All Elite Wrestling (2019–present) ===
==== Best Friends (2019–2022) ====
Statlander made her debut for All Elite Wrestling (AEW) on November 19, 2019, competing in a tag team match alongside Big Swole against Riho and Britt Baker on Dark, where Statlander and Swole were defeated. At the Thanksgiving Eve special episode on November 27, Statlander teamed up with Hikaru Shida to take on Emi Sakura and Bea Priestley in a losing effort. In December, AEW announced that Statlander had signed with the promotion. Following her signing, she defeated Baker on the December 18 episode of Dynamite to become the No. 1 contender for the AEW Women's World Championship. Statlander competed against Riho for the AEW Women's World title on the January 8, 2020, episode of Dynamite, where she was defeated due to interference by Brandi Rhodes, Awesome Kong, Mel, and the debuting Luther. She received another opportunity to compete for the title on February 29, 2020, at Revolution, this time against new champion Nyla Rose, where she was once again defeated. In June 2020, Statlander suffered an ACL injury in her left leg during an episode of Dynamite.

Statlander returned from injury alongside Trent Beretta on March 31, 2021, helping Chuck Taylor and Orange Cassidy defeat Miro and Kip Sabian on Dynamite during an arcade themed match. In September at All Out, she challenged Baker for the AEW Women's World Championship but was again unsuccessful. In November, Statlander–along with Trent, Taylor, Cassidy, and Wheeler Yuta–joined the New Japan Pro-Wrestling-based stable Chaos. In August 2022, Statlander suffered a completely torn ACL and lateral meniscus in her right leg during a match on Dark and stated she would need take time out to recover.

==== TBS Champion; feud with Willow Nightingale (2023–2024) ====
Statlander returned at Double or Nothing in May 2023, appearing after a match between then-AEW TBS Champion Jade Cargill and Taya Valkyrie in which Cargill retained her title. She answered Cargill's open challenge to an impromptu match and won, ending Cargill's 60-match undefeated streak and obtaining the AEW TBS Championship. Over the coming months, Statlander would defend the championship against the likes of Nyla Rose, Anna Jay, Taya Valkyrie among others. At All Out she successfully defended the championship against Ruby Soho, and against a returning Jade Cargill on the September 13 episode of Rampage. Statlander soon began a feud with Julia Hart, which also involved Skye Blue and Willow Nightingale. This led to a match at WrestleDream against Hart, in which Statlander successfully defended the AEW TBS Championship. Statlander would go on to successfully defend the championship against Blue on the October 14 episode of Collision and against Nightingale at Battle of the Belts VIII. At Full Gear, Statlander lost the AEW TBS Championship to Hart, in a three-way match also involving Skye Blue, which ended when Hart pinned Blue. This ended her reign at 174 days. After the loss, Stokely Hathaway would seek a partnership with Statlander and Nightingale. Although at first he was turned away, his offer was later accepted. On the Worlds End: Zero Hour show, which took place in both women's native New York, Statlander was defeated by Nightingale. At Revolution 2024: Zero Hour on March 3, Statlander and Nightingale defeated Blue and Hart.

On May 26, at Double or Nothing, After Nightingale was defeated by Mercedes Moné, Stokely Hathaway berated Nightingale until Statlander pushed him over, seemingly terminating his role as their manager. Moments later, on the ramp Statlander attacked Nightingale and aligned herself with Hathaway once again, revealing the prior events to be a ruse. As a result of the attack, Statlander turned heel. Statlander competed in the Owen Hart Cup, defeating Nyla Rose in the first round but losing to Nightingale in the second. At the All In: Zero Hour show on August 25, Nightingale and Tomohiro Ishii defeated Statlander and Hathaway in a mixed tag team match, which the winner would chose the stipulation of their match at All Out, with Nightingale choosing their match to be a Chicago street fight. The match was meant to be for the CMLL World Women's Championship but that stipulation was abandoned due to CMLL not allowing titles to be defended in street fights. At All Out on September 7, Statlander defeated Nightingale, seemingly ending the feud.

==== Championship pursuits (2024–2025) ====
After defeating Nightingale, Statlander quietly parted ways with Hathaway, with the kayfabe reason for the split being Statlander had invoiced Hathaway a large sum of money to make up for physical therapy, emotional damages and losing her shot at the CMLL World Women's Championship, though this was never acknowledged on AEW programming. As a result of the split, Statlander quietly returned to being a babyface. On the October 4 episode of Rampage Statlander began a feud with TBS Champion Mercedes Moné. On October 30, at Fright Night Dynamite, Statlander defeated Moné's bodyguard Kamille before she was attacked by Moné. A match was set between the two for Full Gear on November 23 for the TBS Championship shortly afterwards. At the event on November 23, Statlander failed to recapture the TBS Championship. The following month it was announced that Statlander would face Moné for the TBS Championship in a rematch at Worlds End on December 28. At the event, Statlander was once again unable to regain the title.

On the March 29, 2025 episode of Collision, Statlander announced her entry into the women's bracket of the Owen Hart Cup, a tournament where the winner will receive an AEW Women's World Championship match at All In. During the tournmanet, Statlander defeated Thunder Rosa in the quarter-finals, but lost to Jamie Hayter in the semi-finals. After the tournament, Statlander began being approached by members of the Death Riders in attempts to recruit her to join the group. On the June 25 episode of Dynamite, Statlander defeated Athena, Willow Nightingale, and Thunder Rosa in a four-way match to earn the number one spot in the women's Casino Gauntlet match at All In on July 12 with assistance from Wheeler Yuta and Marina Shafir of the Death Riders, but failed to win the match at the event.

==== AEW Women's World Champion (2025–2026) ====
At All Out on September 20, Statlander defeated "Timeless" Toni Storm, Jamie Hayter and Thekla to win the AEW Women's World Championship, marking her first world championship in a major promotion, as well as the first woman to have won the AEW Women's World Championship and the AEW TBS Championship. On the September 24 episode of Dynamite, Statlander defeated Mina Shirakawa in her first title defense. After the match, Statlander was confronted by the Death Riders and teased joining the group, but ultimately rejected their offer. On October 18 at WrestleDream, Statlander successfully defended her title against Toni Storm. On November 12 at Blood & Guts, Statlander competed in the first ever women's Blood and Guts match, but her team was defeated. At Full Gear on November 22, Statlander successfully defended her title against Mercedes Moné. At Worlds End on December 27, Statlander successfully defended her title against Jamie Hayter.

On the January 28, 2026 episode of Dynamite, she successfully defended her title against Thekla. On the February 11 episode of Dynamite, Statlander lost the title to Thekla in a strap match, ending her reign at 144 days. At Revolution on March 15, Statlander failed to regain the title from Thekla in a two out of three falls match, losing 1–2.

==== Various storylines (2026–present) ====
After Revolution, Statlander began being approached by Hikaru Shida in attempt to form a tag team. On the April 29 episode of Dynamite, Statlander and Shida would unsuccessfully challenged Divine Dominion (Lena Kross and Megan Bayne) for the AEW Women's World Tag Team Championship. At Double or Nothing on May 24, Statlander once again failed to regain the women's world title from Thekla in a four-way match involving Shida and Jamie Hayter. During the match, Statlander would be betrayed and attacked by Shida, disbanding their tag team. Three days later on Collision, Statlander defeated Shida in a Lights Out Philly Street Fight. On October 10 at Grand Slam France, Statlander teamed with Harley Cameron as "Wrathlander" to win a three-way tag team match to become the #1 contenders to the AEW Women's World Tag Team Championship against The Brawling Birds (Alex Windsor and Jamie Hayter), The match originally scheduled to take a place a week later at WrestleDream but was postponed due to Hayter suffering an injury. On November 4, Wrathlander competed in a six-on-six Blood and Guts match at the namesake event, where their team was victorious after the duo forced Julia Hart to submit. At Full Gear on November 14, Wrathlander defeated The Brawling Birds to win the AEW Women's World Tag Team Championship for the first time as a team, and for the first time for Statlander herself, subsequently making her the second AEW Women's Triple Crown Champion.

=== Pro-Wrestling: EVE (2025–present) ===
On July 4, 2025, Statlander made her debut for the independent women's wrestling promotion Pro-Wrestling: EVE at EVE 136: Mean Grrls, where she defeated Anita Vaughan to win the Pro-Wrestling: EVE International Championship. On March 8, 2026, at Pro Wrestling: EVE's biggest event Wrestle Queendom VIII, successfully defending her title against Charlie (formerly Dakota Kai in WWE). She lost the title on June 5 at History Makers / Rule Breakers to Miyu Yamashita, ending her reign at 336 days. On August 28 at EVE 153: EVE x The World 2, Statlander defeated Session Moth Martina to win the Pro-Wrestling: EVE Championship. She lost the title on November 8 at Elite Encounters II to Kay Lee Ray, ending her reign at 72 days.

== Professional wrestling style and persona ==
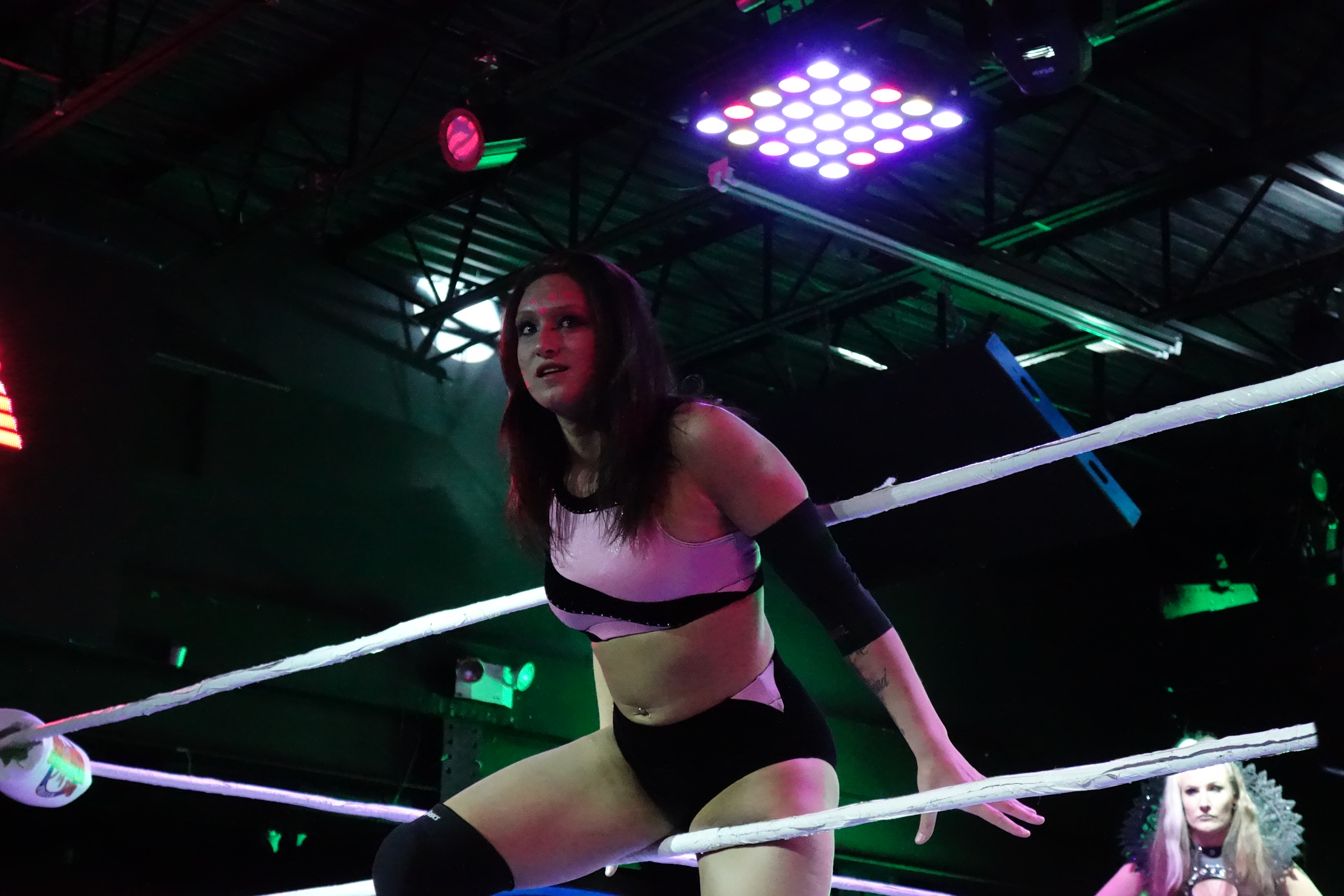
Statlander in April 2019

Statlander originally employed an alien gimmick, which she attributed to her being "a big science nerd". Under this character, she was nicknamed "The Galaxy's Greatest Alien" and billed as having come from the Andromeda Galaxy. Statlander changed her gimmick in 2022 since she felt that with the previous gimmick "I was never really being fully taken seriously", calling the previous character as "too fun, too lovable, I guess, too goofy and easygoing".

Statlander uses a 450° splash and an inverted piledriver as finishers, respectively called Area 451 and the Big Bang Theory. With her change in gimmick, Big Bang Theory was renamed Night Fever depending what night of the week the finisher takes place on (Note: Wednesday Night Fever if the finisher takes place on Dynamite, Friday Night Fever if the finisher takes place on Rampage and Saturday Night Fever if the finisher takes place on Collision or on a pay-per-view.) until she turned heel in 2024 where it was renamed Staturday Night Fever. After she returned to being a babyface later in the year, the name was reverted depending which night it takes place on. In late 2024, it was once again reverted to being called Staturday Night Fever. The finisher's name is a reference to the popular song "More Than a Woman" by the Bee Gees, which she had used as her entrance theme early in her career. Also in 2024, she began to use a discus lariat as both a signature and finishing move.

== Personal life ==
Statlander is a vegetarian. She was formerly in a relationship with independent wrestler Mason Burnett, who is best known as Caleb Konley. She is currently in a relationship with independent wrestler Gino Medina. Statlander has a Shiba Inu named Dino. In addition, Stadtlander has a bearded dragon named Boots, which she formerly shared with Burnett.

Stadtlander revealed in 2024 that she is a licensed massage therapist.

== Other media ==
She appeared as an uncredited stuntwoman extra in the series finale of MTV's Ladylike in 2016. In 2019, she provided motion capture for WWE 2K20. In 2022, Statlander along with Orange Cassidy and Chuck Taylor appeared in the third season of Netflix's Floor is Lava.

== Filmography ==
Television
Year	Title	Role	Notes
2016	Ladylike	Uncredited; stuntwoman	Series finale
2021	Rhodes to the Top	Herself	
2022	Floor Is Lava	Herself	

Web series
Year	Title	Role	Notes
2020-2022	Being The Elite	Herself	Series regular

Video game appearances
Year	Title	Role	Notes
2019	WWE 2K20		Motion capture only
2023	AEW Fight Forever	Herself	

== Championships and accomplishments ==
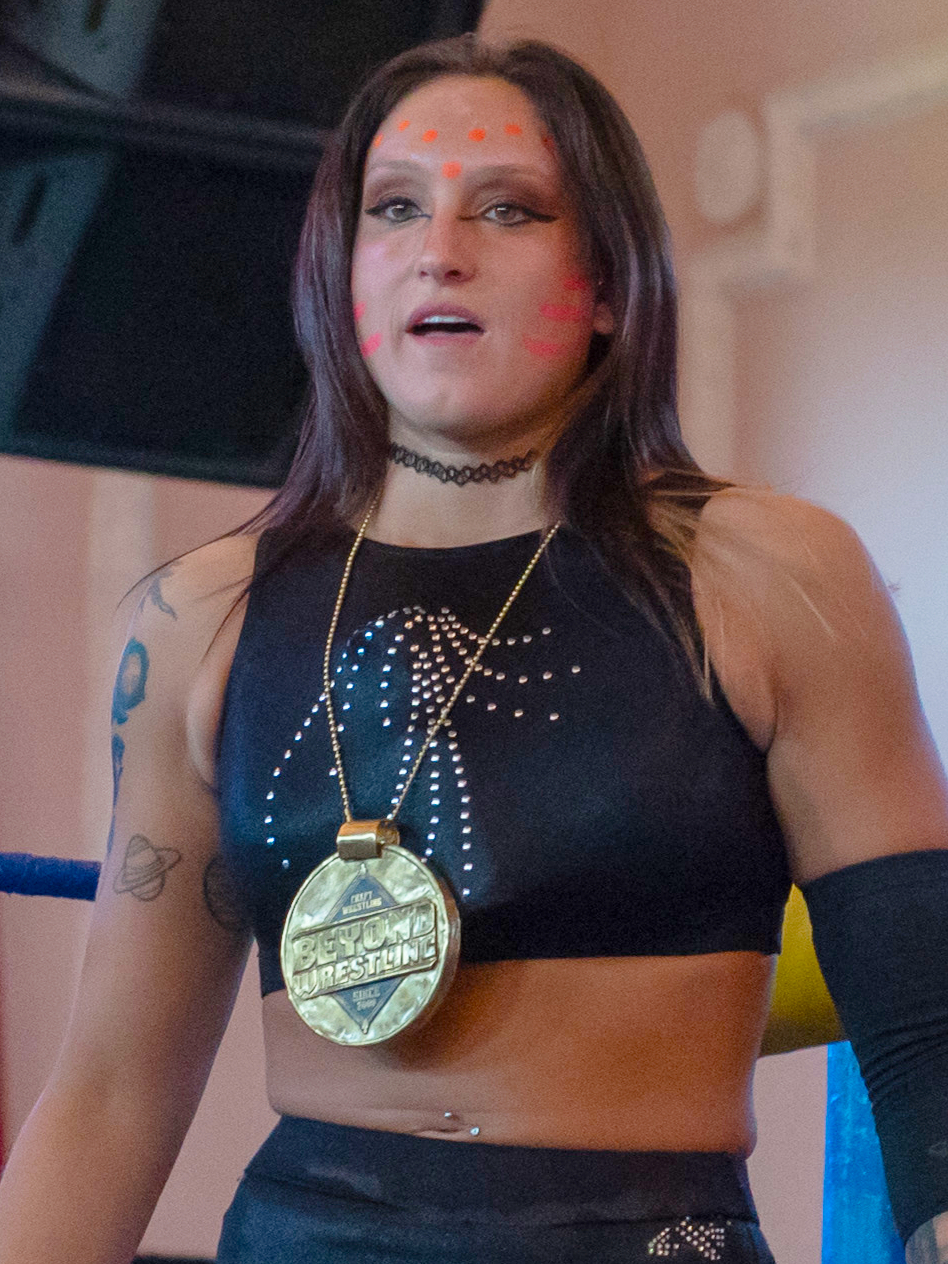
Statlander was Beyond Wrestling's Treasure Hunter tournament winner in 2019

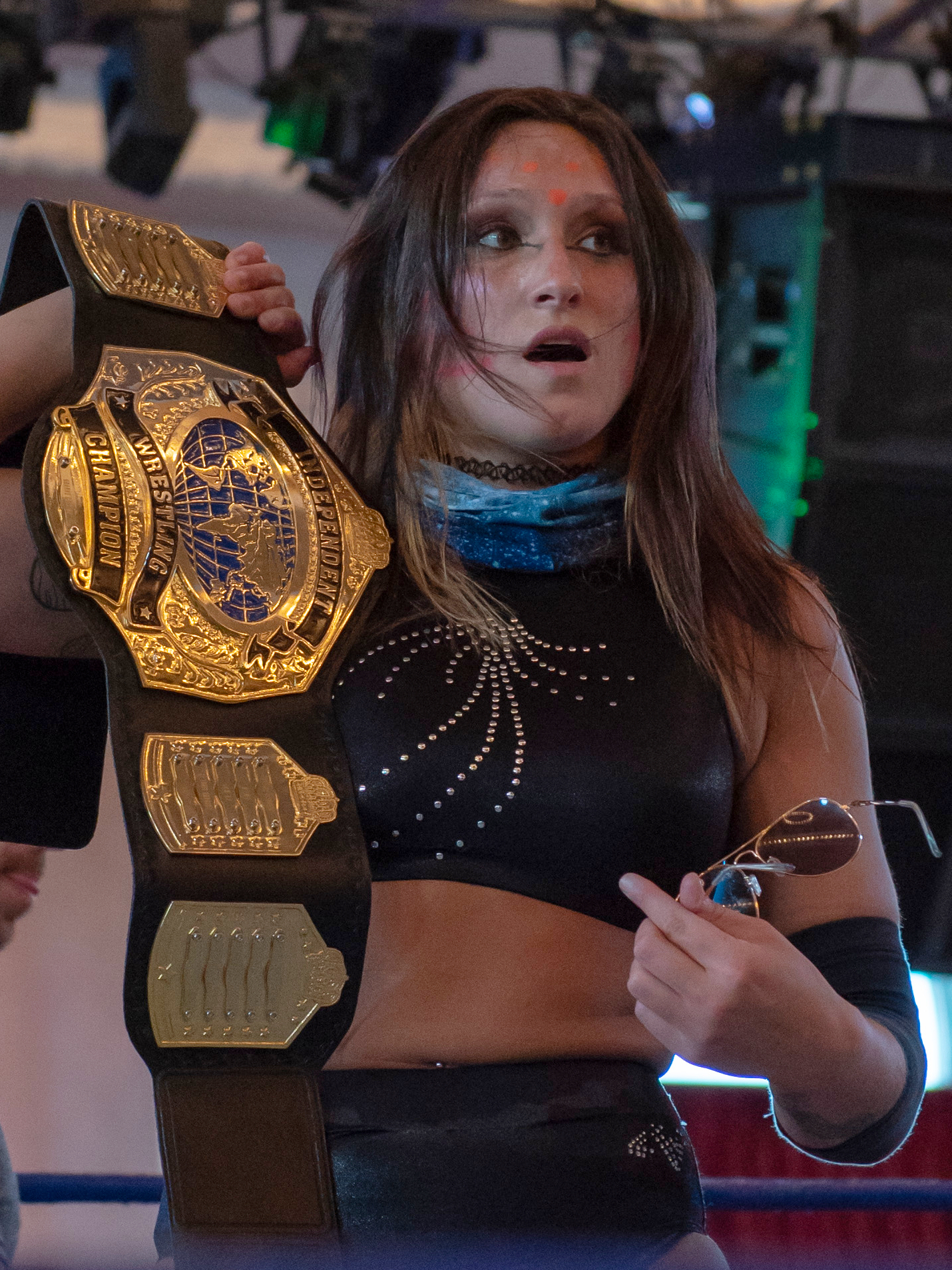
Statlander as IndependentWrestling.TV's "Independent Wrestling Champion"

- AAW Wrestling
  - AAW Women's Championship (1 time)
- All Elite Wrestling
  - AEW Women's World Championship (1 time)
  - AEW TBS Championship (1 time)
  - AEW Women's World Tag Team Championship (1 time, current) – with Harley Cameron
  - Second AEW Women's Triple Crown Champion
- Create A Pro Wrestling
  - CAP Television Championship (1 time)
  - Inaugural CAP TV Championship Tournament (2019)
- Beyond Wrestling
  - Treasure Hunter Tournament (2019)
- IndependentWrestling.TV
  - Independent Wrestling Championship (1 time)
- New York Wrestling Connection
  - NYWC Starlet Championship (1 time)
- Pro-Wrestling: EVE
  - Pro-Wrestling: EVE International Championship (1 time)
  - Pro-Wrestling: EVE Championship (1 time)
- Pro Wrestling Illustrated
  - Ranked No. 10 on the top 250 women's wrestlers in the PWI Women's 250 in 2026
- Sports Illustrated
  - Ranked No. 6 of the top 10 women's wrestlers in 2019
- Victory Pro Wrestling
  - VPW Women's Championship (2 times)
- Women Superstars United
  - WSU World Championship (1 time)
  - Interim WSU World Championship (1 time)
  - WSU Spirit Championship (1 time)

== Luchas de Apuestas record ==
Winner (wager)	Loser (wager)	Location	Event	Date	Notes
Ashley Vox and Kris Statlander (career)	Jeremy Leary and Skylar (hair)	Portland, Maine	Limitless Know Your Enemy	September 6, 2019	
