= Charlie Morgan (wrestler) =

English professional wrestler

Personal information
- Born: Yasmin Josephine Lander; 19 April 1992 (age 33) Cambridge, England, United Kingdom
- Spouse: Victoria Owen (m. 2023)

Professional wrestling career
- Ring name(s): Charlie Morgan; Lady Penelope; Penelope
- Billed height: 5 ft 6 in (167 cm)
- Billed weight: 125 lb (57 kg)
- Billed from: Cambridge, England, United Kingdom
- Trained by: Danny Boy Collins; Paige; Ricky Knight; Sweet Saraya
- Debut: May 2011
- Retired: June 2024

Yasmin Josephine Lander (born 19 April 1992) is an English retired professional wrestler best known under the ring name, Charlie Morgan. She is known for her appearances in Progress Wrestling, Bellatrix Female Warriors, World Association of Wrestling, Southside Wrestling Entertainment, as well as Pro-Wrestling: EVE where she is a former champion. Morgan also worked for WWE in their NXT UK division.

== Professional wrestling career ==
=== Independent circuit (2011–2019) ===
Lander made her professional wrestling debut in 2011 after being trained by the Knight wrestling family and Danny Collins. She debuted under the ring name, Penelope. In her debut match, she teamed with Amy-Lee Kramer, Liberty and Stacey and were defeated by Britani Knight, Amazon, Destiny and Melodi. In November 2011, she made her Bellatrix debut, losing to Rhia O'Reilly. In December 2012, Penelope lost to Alpha Female in her Southside Wrestling Entertainment debut. In 2013, she was defeated by Christina Von Eerie. In 2014, Penelope made her All Star Wrestling debut defeating Sammi Baynz. In 2016, Penelope was involved in a Queen Of Southside Title four way also involving Nixon Newell, Toni Storm and Jade in which Jade won. Lander made her Copenhagen Championship Wrestling debut in March 2017 as Charlie Morgan defeating Regina. In November 2017, she made her Revolution Pro Wrestling debut losing to Jinny. In July 2018, she defeated Morgan Webster.

=== Pro Wrestling:EVE (2017–2019, 2021–2024) ===
Lander made her Pro-Wrestling: EVE debut in May 2017, losing to Kay Lee Ray. The next night Morgan was defeated by Kris Wolf. At Dangerous Women she defeated Kasey Owens in a SHE-1 qualifier. She defeated Meiko Satomura and Sammii Jayne in the finals to win the SHE-1 tournament. At a XWA and EVE joint show she was defeated by Doug Williams. At Wrestle Queendom, Morgan defeated Jayne to become Pro-Wrestling: EVE champion in her first reign. On 30 June 2019 Morgan announced her retirement after an ankle injury.

At Wrestle Queendom 4 on 27 August 2021, Lander made her surprise return to the promotion after promos touting the arrival of a mysterious "Gambler."

Morgan announced her retirement and final match via social media on 11 April 2024. Her final match will take place at the "Once More With Feeling" event where she will wrestle alongside her wife for the final time for both of them.

=== Progress Wrestling (2017–2018) ===
Charlie Morgan made her Progress Wrestling debut losing to Charli Evans in October 2017, in a PROGRESS Women's Title number one contendership tournament. At Chapter 63, Morgan and Toni Storm defeated Nina Samuels and Chakara. At Chapter 64 she defeated Millie McKenzie. In July 2018, she defeated Candyfloss.

=== WWE ===
==== NXT UK (2018–2019) ====
Morgan made her WWE debut on night two of the 2018 United Kingdom Championship Tournament, defeating Killer Kelly.

== Personal life ==
Lander publicly came out as gay at a Pro-Wrestling: EVE event. In August 2023, she married fellow professional wrestler Victoria Owen, better known by the ring name Jetta.

== Championships and accomplishments ==
- Bellatrix Female Warriors
  - Bellatrix British Championship (1 time)
  - DOA Sirens Championship (1 time)
- Pro-Wrestling: EVE
  - Pro-Wrestling: EVE Championship (1 time)
  - SHE-1 (2017)
- Real Quality Wrestling
  - RQW European Women's Championship (1 time)
