= Sadie Gibbs =

English professional wrestler

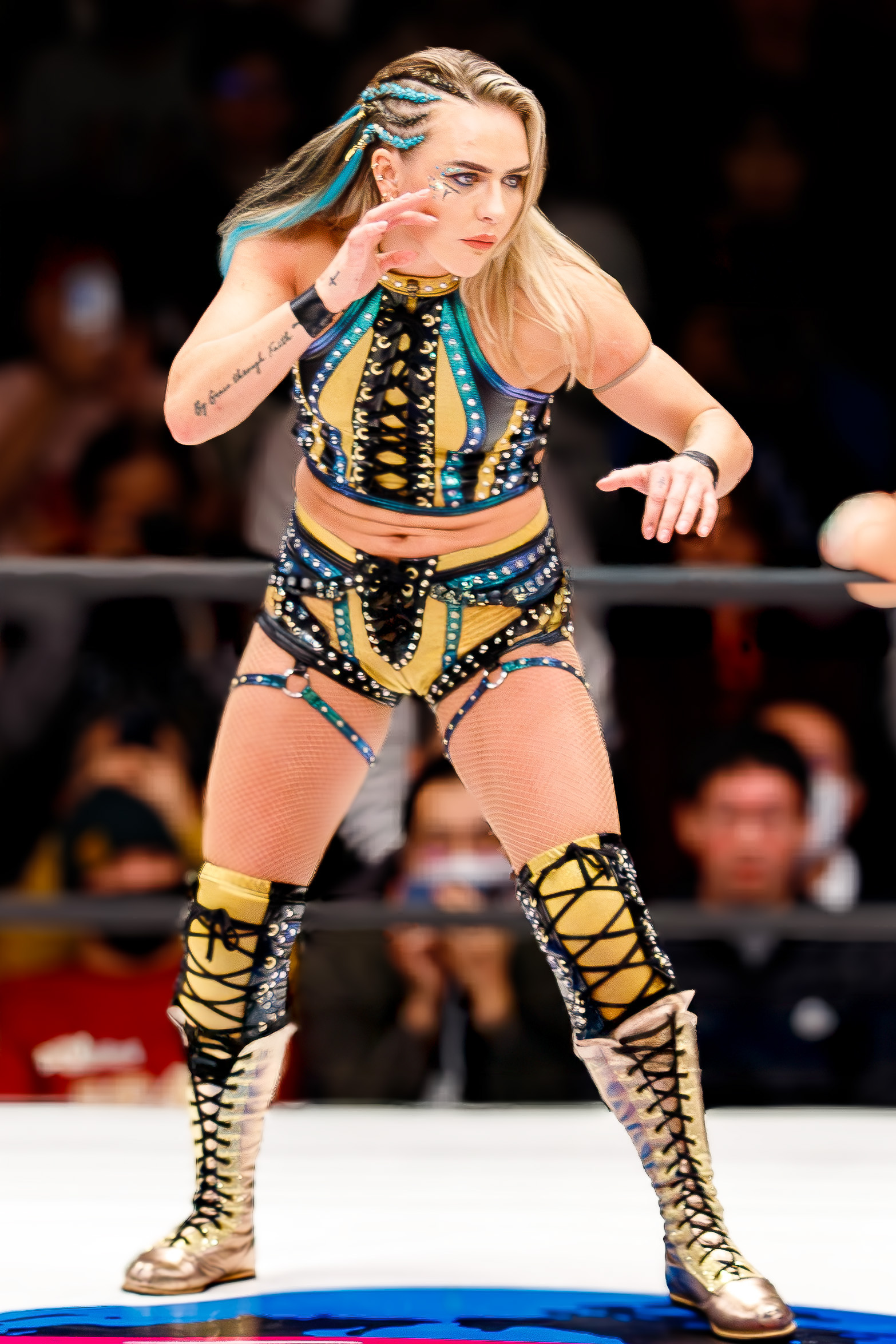

Personal information
- Born: 30 March 1992 (age 34) Kent, England, U.K.

Professional wrestling career
- Billed height: 5 ft 6 in (168 cm)
- Billed weight: 158 lb (72 kg)
- Billed from: London, England
- Debut: 3 December 2017

Sadie Gibbs (born 30 March 1992) is an English professional wrestler and gymnast. She is best known for her appearances in All Elite Wrestling (AEW), World Wonder Ring Stardom, Pro-Wrestling: EVE, The Wrestling League, WrestleGate Pro and British Empire Wrestling (BEW).

== Professional wrestling career ==
On 19 November 2017, wrestling under her real name, lost to Nina Samuels for London Lucha League. On 3 February, at the DWA Wrestling Legendshow 2019 event, Gibbs won the vacant DWA Ladies Championship, her first title in her career, after defeating ODB. On 2 January 2019, Gibbs made her debut for World Wonder Ring Stardom, teaming up with Mari Apache, losing to J.A.N. (Jungle Kyona and Ruaka). On 3 January, Gibbs competed again with Mary Apache and Natsumi, winning against Hanan, Hina and Rina. On 5 January, Gibbs wrestled Jamie Hayter to a 10-minute time limit draw. On 19 January, Gibbs made her last appearance in Stardom, teaming with Bobbi Tyler and Hana Kimura, and defeated STARS (Mayu Iwatani, Starlight Kid and Tam Nakano).

In mid-2019, it was reported that Gibbs was close to signing a contract with All Elite Wrestling (AEW). On 25 May, during the Double or Nothing pre-show, Gibbs' promo was shown, confirming her signing by the promotion. On 31 August at All Out, she made her debut during the Women's Casino Battle Royale, being one of three women to eliminate Awesome Kong, before being eliminated by rival Bea Priestley. On the 5 November episode of AEW Dark, Gibbs picked up her first victory by pinning Big Swole, in a tag team match with Allie against Swole and Mercedes Martinez. Gibbs was released from AEW on 13 August 2020.

On 28 April 2021, Sadie announced her retirement from professional wrestling via an Instagram post to focus on her fitness career.

In 2024, Gibbs came out of retirement and has continued her professional wrestling career, most notably wrestling in the Japanese promotion Pro Wrestling Noah.

== Championships and accomplishments ==
- Deutsche Wrestling Allianz
  - DWA Ladies Championship (1 time)
