= Jenny Sjödin =

Swedish female professional wrestler

Personal information
- Born: Anna Jenny Thunell; August 2, 1985 (age 40) Hudiksvall, Sweden
- Website: SjodinTraining.co.uk

Professional wrestling career
- Ring name(s): Jenny Sjödin; The Swedish Tigress
- Billed height: 1.73 m (5 ft 8 in)
- Billed weight: 68 kg (150 lb)
- Billed from: Sundsvall, Sweden; Hudiksvall, Sweden
- Trained by: Fergal Devitt; Jon Ryan; Paul Tracey; Phil Boyd; Peter Farrell; Pippa L'Vinn; Psycho Steve; Sean Maxer Brennan; Zack Sabre Jr.
- Debut: July 7, 2007

Anna Jenny Sjödin (née Thunell; August 2, 1985) is a Swedish professional wrestler and submission grappler. She was trained in professional wrestling in several schools across Great Britain and Ireland and has spent most of her career working there for promotions such as Fightstar Sports Entertainment (FSE), Futureshock Wrestling (FSW) and Pro-Wrestling: EVE, where she is a former one-time Pro-Wrestling: EVE Champion. Sjödin is also an accomplished submission grappler, having won a gold medal in Ground Control's 2010 no-gi tournament and silver medals in Grapplers Quest's advanced division and North American Grappling Association's (NAGA) European Championships that same year.

== Professional wrestling career ==
Sjödin first became interested in professional wrestling at the age of seventeen, after seeing the Gaea Girls documentary on Japanese joshi puroresu, after which she began following the All Japan Women's Pro-Wrestling (AJW) promotion. Having trained amateur wrestling with Skönsbergs brottningsklubb, Sjödin moved to Dublin, Ireland in April 2007 to begin training professional wrestling under Fergal Devitt, Paul Tracey, Phil Boyd and Peter Farrell with NWA Ireland. She made her debut on July 7, 2007, facing one of her trainers, Phil Boyd, at a Spanish Wrestling Association (SWA) event in Segovia, Spain. During the next years, Sjödin worked for several independent promotions in countries such as England, Ireland, Denmark, Finland and her native Sweden. In March 2008, Sjödin took part in the American Wrestling Rampage (AWR) promotion's tour of Ireland, along with several former WWE wrestlers. During the tour, Sjödin had a five match series with German wrestler Alpha Female, which she won 3–2. In the beginning of 2009, she moved to Manchester, England to continue her training under the likes of Jon Ryan, Paul Tracey, Psycho Steve and Zack Sabre Jr. with NWA UK Hammerlock and The Wrestling Factory. While training in Manchester, Sjödin began incorporating more mixed martial arts and grappling based offense into her in-ring style.

On May 8, 2010, Sjödin took part in Pro-Wrestling: EVE's inaugural event in Sudbury, Suffolk, England, losing to April Davids in the opening match. The match marked the launching of EVE's "Catch Division", where matches could only be won by submission or referee stoppage. Sjödin avenged her loss against Davids on October 16, 2010. Sjödin then formed the villainous European Empire stable with Davids, Nikki Storm and Shanna, under the leadership of Jetta, while also starting a storyline rivalry with Britani Knight, which led to a trilogy of singles matches between the two. After both wrestlers had managed to win one of the matches, Sjödin defeated Knight in the third match on June 4, 2011, to become the second Pro-Wrestling: EVE Champion. After failing to become the inaugural Nordic Women's Champion, losing to Finnish wrestler Aurora Flame, following outside interference from Miss Mina, Sjödin challenged Flame to a rematch, where she agreed to put her Pro-Wrestling: EVE Championship also on the line. On August 13, 2011, Sjödin defeated Flame to retain her title and win the Nordic Women's Championship. On October 8, Sjödin defeated April Davids in a rubber match to retain the Pro-Wrestling: EVE Championship. The following night, Sjödin successfully defended the title against one of her idols, Japanese wrestler Emi Sakura, in a match that was broadcast on Ice Ribbon's 19 O'Clock Girls ProWrestling program on Ustream. After a reign of 302 days and eight successful title defenses, Sjödin lost the Pro-Wrestling: EVE Championship to the Alpha Female on April 4, 2011. On August 25, 2012, Sjödin unsuccessfully challenged April Davids for Futureshock Wrestling's (FSW) Women's Championship.

== Grappling career ==
After moving to Manchester in 2009, Sjödin also began training Brazilian jiu-jitsu, submission grappling and mixed martial arts under Rosi Sexton at the Fighting Fit Martial Arts Centre. On May 23, 2010, she won the gold medal in the female division of Ground Control's no-gi grappling tournament. As a result of her win, Sjödin earned herself a trip to New Jersey, United States to take part in the Grapplers Quest tournament. After taking the silver medal in the 120 lb (54 kg)–139.9 lb (63.5 kg) division, Sjödin finished off her 2010 with another silver medal at the North American Grappling Association's European Championships in Paris, France.

== Personal life ==
Sjödin is a former member of the Sundsvall city council as a representative of the Liberal People's Party. She has a degree in political science. In 2013, Sjödin began working as a columnist for the Body Confidential website. In a column on October 17, 2013, Sjödin revealed she was six months pregnant. On January 17, 2014, Sjödin announced she had given birth.

== Championships and accomplishments ==
=== Professional wrestling ===
- Fight Club Finland
  - Nordic Women's Championship (1 time)
- Pro-Wrestling: EVE
  - Pro-Wrestling: EVE Championship (1 time)

=== Submission grappling ===
- Grapplers Quest
  - Women's Advanced No-Gi 120–139.9 lbs Division Silver Medal (2010)
- Ground Control
  - Female Division Gold Medal (2010)
- North American Grappling Association
  - European Championship Silver Medal (2010)
