= Alba Fyre =

Scottish professional wrestler (born 1992)

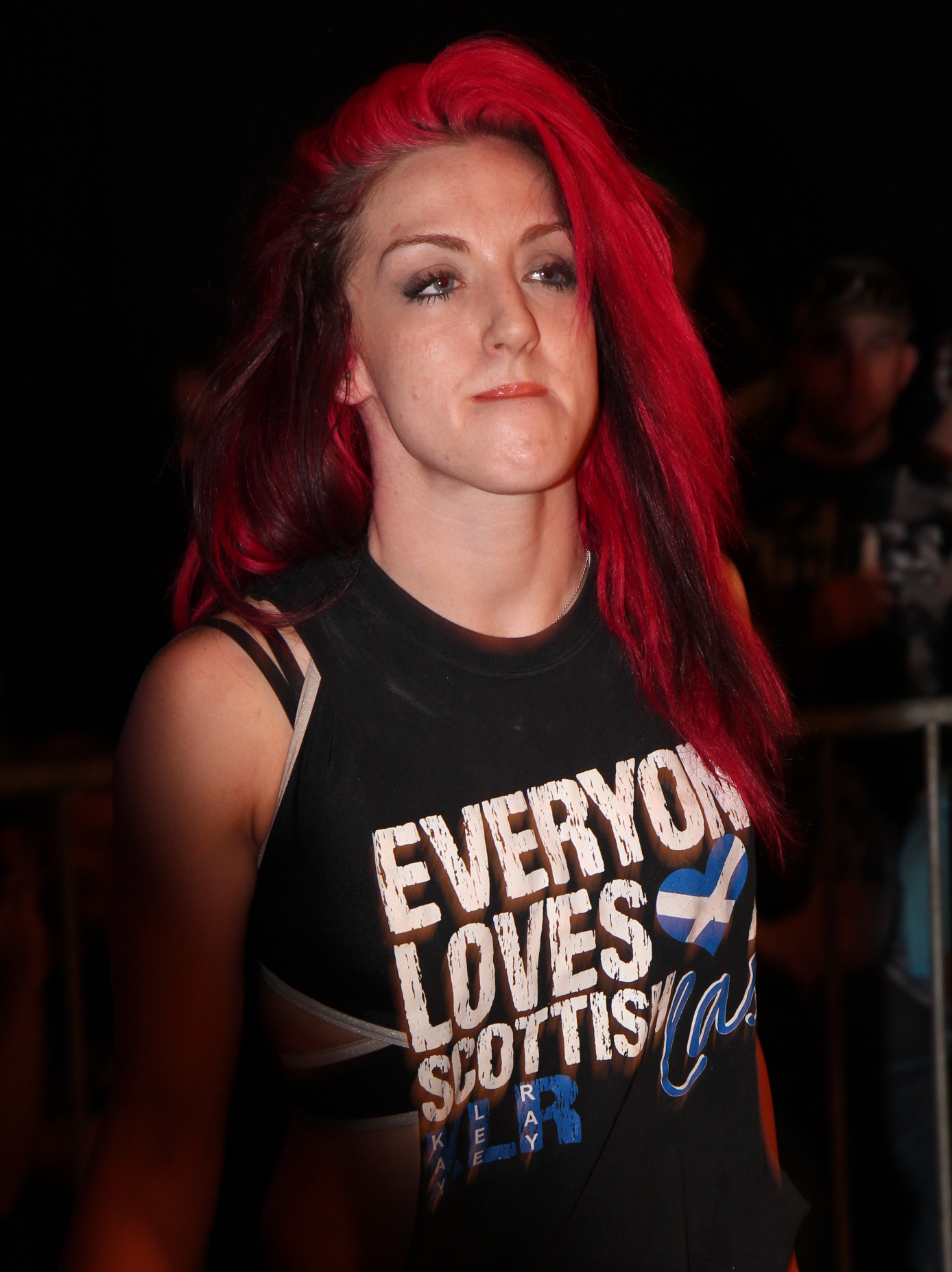
- Fyre in 2015

Personal information
- Born: Kayleigh Rae; 11 August 1992 (age 34) Paisley, Renfrewshire, Scotland
- Spouse: Stevie Boy (m. 2021)

Professional wrestling career
- Ring name(s): Alba Fyre; Kay Lee Ray
- Billed height: 5 ft 8 in (1.73 m)
- Billed weight: 112 lb (51 kg)
- Billed from: Johnstone, Scotland; Glasgow, Scotland
- Trained by: Kid Fite
- Debut: 30 May 2009

Kayleigh Kerr (née Rae; born 11 August 1992), also known by the ring name Kay Lee Ray (a ring name akin to her birth name, Kayleigh Rae), is a Scottish professional wrestler. She is primarily working for Pro-Wrestling: EVE, where she is the current Pro-Wrestling: EVE Champion in her second reign. She is best known for her tenure in WWE under the ring name Alba Fyre.

Rae began her wrestling career on the British independent circuit. She joined Insane Championship Wrestling (ICW) in 2011, becoming a three-time ICW Women's Champion and a member of the Filthy Generation. She has also competed in World of Sport Wrestling, where she became a one-time WOS Women's Champion, and Pro-Wrestling: EVE, where she became a one-time Pro-Wrestling: EVE Champion. Having wrestled internationally, Rae competed in the American independent circuit for Shimmer Women Athletes, and in Japan for World Wonder Ring Stardom.

After competing in WWE's inaugural Mae Young Classic in 2017, Rae signed with WWE in 2019 and debuted on their NXT UK brand, becoming a one-time NXT UK Women's Champion, holding the record for the longest WWE women's reign at 649 days. (Note: The WWF Women's Championship only became WWF property in 1984, making The Fabulous Moolah's (disputed) 10,170-day reign as NWA Women's Champion a non-WWE title reign.) She moved to NXT in 2021, changed her ring name to Alba Fyre in April of the following year, became a one-time NXT Women's Tag Team Champion alongside Isla Dawn in 2023 (with their team being the final holder of the championship before it was unified with the WWE Women's Tag Team Championship), and moved up to the main roster in April of that year. In 2024, Fyre and Dawn won the WWE Women's Tag Team Championship, becoming the second female tag team to have won the WWE and NXT Women's Tag Team Championships.

== Early and personal life ==
Kayleigh Rae was born on 11 August 1992 in Paisley, Renfrewshire.

In 2008, Rae met fellow wrestler Stephen Kerr (best known as Stevie Boy), and later dated. They married in July 2021 after 13 years On 17 May 2024, Rae's mother and stepfather were struck by a car in Orlando, Florida while visiting her. Her step-father survived but her mother died shortly following the incident, aged 51.

== Professional wrestling career ==
=== Independent circuit (2009–2019) ===
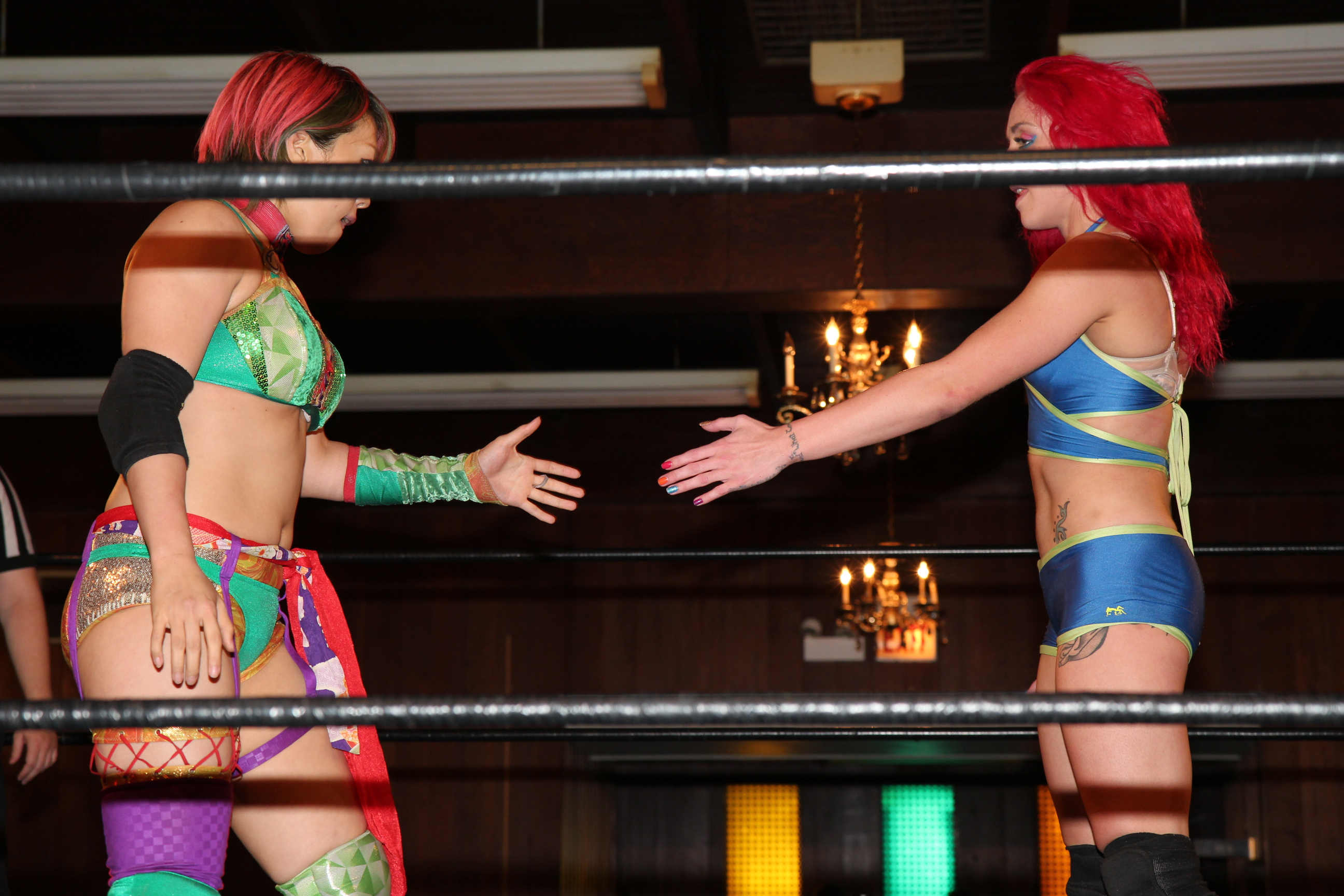
Ray (right) faces off against Kana in SHIMMER in 2013

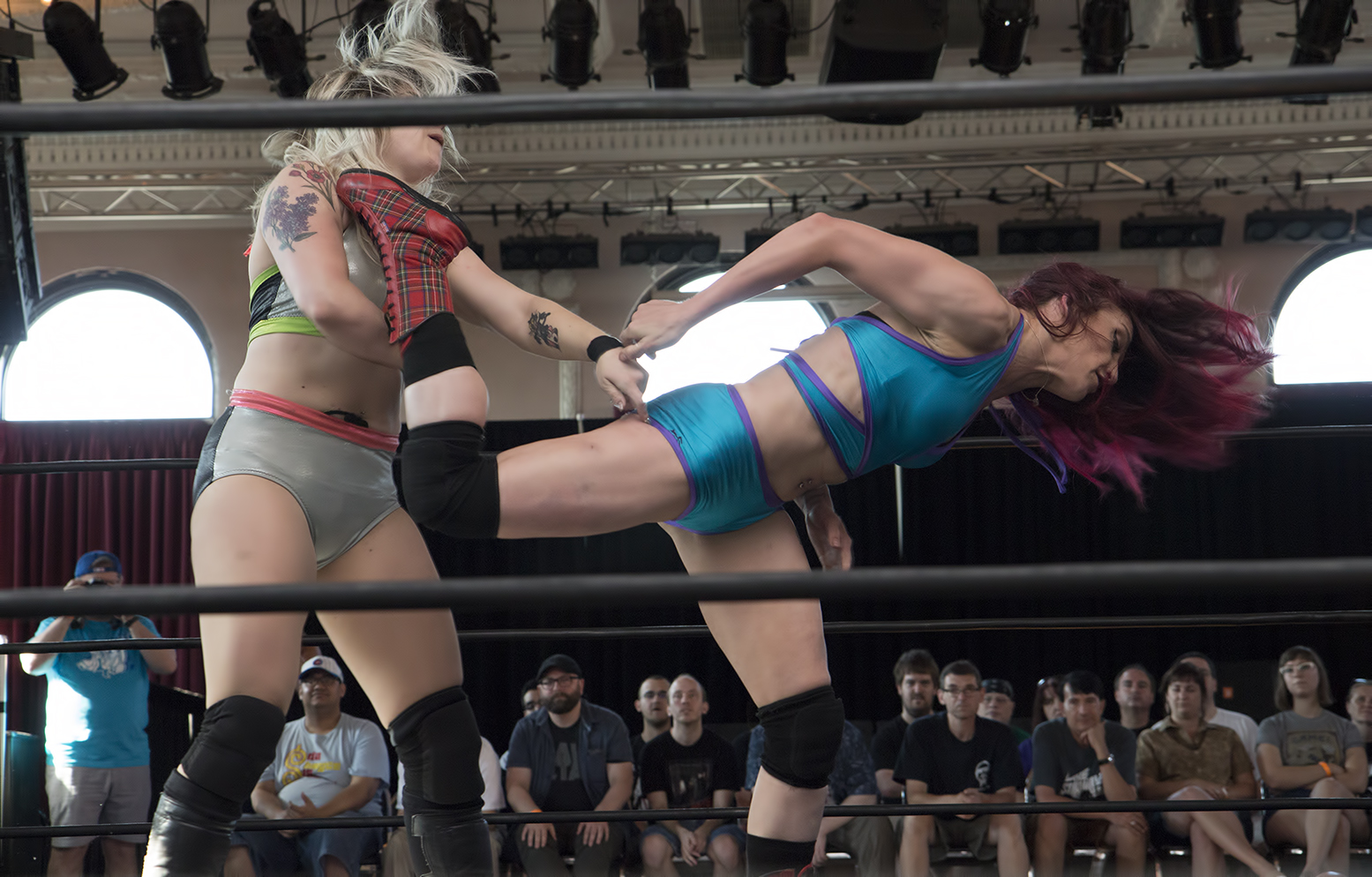
Ray delievers a superkick to Kimber Lee in SHIMMER 2016

Trained by Kid Fite, Rae made her debut under the ring name Kay Lee Ray at SWA Battlezone on 30 May 2009, losing a Battlezone Rumble to determine the number one contender for the NWA Scottish Heavyweight Championship. The same match had other Scottish wrestlers and ICW alumnus such as Joe Coffey, Big Damo, Stevie Xavier (her future husband), Viper (later Piper Niven), and Chris Renfrew.

On 9 August 2014, Ray defeated Martin Kirby to win the SWE Speed King Championship.

On 28 February 2015, she defeated Candice LeRae, Nixon Newell, and Saraya Knight to win the SWE Queen of Southside Championship. On 24 October, she lost the championship to Newell in a tag team match where Newell's tag team partner Jimmy Havoc defended his Speed King Championship against Ray's tag team partner El Ligero. On 27 December, she was defeated by Ligero in a Loser Leaves Southside match.

On 7 August 2016, Ray won the Queen of Southside Championship in a three-way match against Alex Windsor and Jade, and lost the championship two months later to Melina.

At WCPW Built to Destroy on 16 June 2017, Ray won the WCPW Women's Championship from Viper, who replaced Bea Priestley in the match.

=== Insane Championship Wrestling (2011–2019) ===
Ray made her Insane Championship Wrestling debut at The Notorious I.C.W. on 6 February 2011, defeating Carmel.

At Luke...Who Yer Da? on 4 May 2013, Ray defeated Viper in a tournament final to win the Fierce Females Championship.

At Shug's Hoose Party on 27 July 2014, Ray and Stevie Boy unsuccessfully challenged for the vacant ICW Tag Team Championship in a match that was won by BT Gunn and Chris Renfrew.

On 29 May 2015, Ray lost the Fierce Females Championship (now called the Scottish Women's Championship) to Viper in a 20-woman rumble, ending her reign at 755 days. On 15 November, she faced Nikki Storm and Viper in a three-way match for the inaugural ICW Women's Championship, which was won by Viper.

On 20 November 2016, Ray won the ICW Women's Championship by defeating Viper and champion Carmel Jacob in a three-way match at Fear & Loathing IX.

On 29 July 2017, at Shug's Hoose Party IV, Ray lost the ICW Women's Championship to Kasey Owens in 37 seconds. She won it back at 1 October Fight Club tapings. She lost the title the next month to Owens at Fear & Loathing X on 19 November in a three-way steel cage match also involving Viper.

At Fear and Loathing XI on 2 December 2018, Ray won the Women's Championship from Viper in the inaugural Queen of Insanity match.

Ray entered the 2012, 2014, and 2018 Square Go! matches.

=== Total Nonstop Action Wrestling (2014–2015) ===
Ray appeared for Total Nonstop Action Wrestling (TNA) in 2014 on the second season of TNA British Boot Camp. Her first match on the show was taped on 16 August, where she lost in a four-way match won by Nikki Storm and also involved Kasey Owens and Leah Owens. Her second match was a loss taped on 6 September in an eight-person tag team match alongside Al Snow, Grado, and Mark Andrews against Angelina Love, Dave Mastiff, Rampage Brown, and Noam Dar. On the finale, taped on 7 December, she was revealed to be in the top three competitors, after which she faced Gail Kim in a losing effort. Andrews won the show and the TNA contract.

Ray later appeared on two episodes of TNA Xplosion taped in the United Kingdom, with the first being a victory alongside Noam Dar against Gail Kim and Rampage Brown on 29 January 2015, and the other on 31 January in a victory alongside Andrews, Dar, and Crazzy Steve against Brown, Dave Mastiff, Madison Rayne, and Samuel Shaw.

=== World of Sport (2018–2019) ===
At the 5 May 2018 tapings of the newly-revived World of Sport Wrestling, Ray won the vacant WOS Women's Championship in a three-way match against Bea Priestley and Viper. She successfully defended the title on subsequent episodes in a battle royal and a singles match against Viper.

On 19 January 2019, during a WOS house show tour, Ray lost her championship in a three-way match when she was pinned by Viper.

=== WWE ===
==== Early appearances and Mae Young Classic (2015–2017) ====
Ray made a one-off WWE appearance at the 8 October 2015 tapings of NXT, losing to Nia Jax.

On 13 July 2017, Ray again competed in WWE as one of 32 competitors in the inaugural Mae Young Classic, where she lost to Princesa Sugehit in the first round. The next night, she competed in a six-woman tag team match as part of the Mae Young Classic – Road to the Finals event, where she teamed up with Jazzy Gabert and Tessa Blanchard to defeat Marti Belle, Santana Garrett, and Sarah Logan.

==== NXT UK Women's Champion (2019–2021) ====
At NXT UK TakeOver: Blackpool on 12 January 2019, Ray and Jazzy Gabert appeared at ringside. It was later confirmed that the two had signed with WWE, marking Ray's first contract with WWE. On 13 March, Ray made her NXT UK in-ring debut as a villainess, defeating Candy Floss. On 19 June episode of NXT UK, Ray won a battle royal to earn an opportunity to face NXT UK Women's Champion Toni Storm at a time of her choosing. On 17 July episode of NXT UK, Ray said she will face Storm at NXT UK TakeOver: Cardiff. At TakeOver: Cardiff, Ray defeated Storm to win the NXT UK Women's Championship, becoming the first British-born wrestler to hold the title. On 13 November episode of NXT, Ray interfered during a "WarGames Advantage" ladder match between Shayna Baszler's team member Io Shirai and Rhea Ripley's team member Mia Yim, helping Shirai win the match and revealing herself as the fourth member of Baszler's team in the first ever Women's WarGames Match. Ripley's team would defeat Baszler's team at NXT TakeOver: WarGames.

On 8 January 2020 episode of NXT, Ray returned and teamed with Bianca Belair and Io Shirai in a six-woman tag team match against Storm, Ripley and Candice LeRae in a losing effort. On 12 December episode of NXT UK, it was announced that Ray would defend the NXT UK Women's Championship against Storm and Piper Niven in a triple threat match at NXT UK TakeOver: Blackpool II. Ray would go on to retain her title against Storm and Niven at TakeOver: Blackpool II. On 27 February episode of NXT UK, Ray retained her title against Storm in an "I Quit" match with the stipulation that if Storm lost, she could no longer challenge Ray during Ray's championship reign. After the match, Ray started a feud with Niven after Niven watched Ray brutally attack Storm. On 2 April episode of NXT UK, Ray and Jinny successfully defeated Niven and Dani Luna. On 24 September episode of NXT UK, Ray retained her title against Niven. On 5 November episode of NXT UK, Ray and Niven's feud continued after Ray insulted Niven, so Niven came out and attacked Ray in the ring and backstage. On 19 November episode of NXT UK, Ray was again successful in defending her title against Niven in a Falls Count Anywhere Match, when Jinny interfered as a result of Niven disrespecting her two weeks prior.

Ray retained her title in a championship match against Jinny on 21 January 2021, and Meiko Satomura on 4 March. On 10 June episode of NXT UK, Ray, in what would be her final appearance for the brand, lost the title to Satomura, ending her record-setting reign at 649 days.

==== NXT (2021–2022) ====
At NXT TakeOver 36 on 22 August 2021, Ray made her debut appearance for NXT at the conclusion of the NXT Women's Championship match between Raquel González and Dakota Kai. On 23 November episode of NXT, Ray distracted Mandy Rose during her match against Cora Jade, causing Rose to lose the match. Later that night, she joined Io Shirai's team at NXT WarGames, teasing a face turn in the process. At WarGames on 5 December, her team was victorious; during the match, she teased turning on her team when she approached an injured Jade with a kendo stick, only to turn and attack Kai instead, thus cementing her face turn.

Ray would unsuccessfully challenge Mandy Rose for the NXT Women's Championship on 8 February 2022 episode of NXT due to interference from Toxic Attraction (Gigi Dolin and Jacy Jayne). Shortly after, she and Io Shirai would team up in the 2022 Women's Dusty Rhodes Tag Team Classic where they defeated Amari Miller and Lash Legend in the first round, Kacy Catanzaro and Kayden Carter in the semifinals, and Dakota Kai and Wendy Choo in the finals. This would lead to a fatal four-way match at NXT Stand & Deliver on 2 April where she failed to win the NXT Women's Championship. On 26 April episode of NXT, Ray's ring name was changed to Alba Fyre. On 10 May episode of NXT, she defeated Amari Miller. After defeating Tatum Paxley on 7 June episode of NXT, she was attacked by Lash Legend, starting a feud between the two. Fyre would defeat Legend on 21 June episode of NXT by disqualification after Legend used Fyre's own bat, and defeated her again on 2 August episode. At NXT Halloween Havoc on 22 October, Fyre unsuccessfully challenged Mandy Rose for the NXT Women's Championship.

==== The Unholy Union (2022–2025) ====
On 15 November episode of NXT, Fyre lost her championship rematch against Rose in a Last Woman Standing match when a returning Isla Dawn interfered. This led to a match between Fyre and Dawn at NXT Deadline on 10 December where Dawn was victorious. Fyre defeated Dawn in an Extreme Resolution match on 3 January 2023 episode of NXT, and failed to win the NXT Women's Tag Team Championship three weeks later. Fyre turned heel again and joined forces with Dawn on 31 January episode of NXT. At NXT Stand & Deliver on 1 April, Fyre and Dawn defeated Fallon Henley and Kiana James to win the NXT Women's Tag Team Championship. They would retain their titles in a rematch against Henley and James on 11 April episode of NXT and against Katana Chance and Kayden Carter on 1 May episode of NXT. As part of the 2023 WWE Draft, Fyre and Dawn were drafted to the SmackDown brand together. Fyre and Dawn made their SmackDown debut on 19 May 2023, defeating Valentina Feroz and Yulisa Leon. On 9 June episode of SmackDown, Fyre and Dawn were confronted by the WWE Women's Tag Team Champions Ronda Rousey and Shayna Baszler, who challenged them to a unification match on 23 June episode of SmackDown, where Fyre and Dawn lost the match, ending their reign at 83 days and were recognised as the final NXT Women's Tag Team Champions. Fyre and Dawn returned on 22 December episode of SmackDown to attack Damage CTRL during the Holiday Havoc Match. The team of Fyre and Dawn is now called The Unholy Union.

On Night 1 of the 2024 WWE Draft, both Fyre and Dawn were drafted to the Raw brand. On 15 June 2024 at Clash at the Castle: Scotland, The Unholy Union defeated Bianca Belair and Jade Cargill for the WWE Women's Tag Team Championships in a triple threat tag team match also involving Shayna Baszler and Zoey Stark, making The Unholy Union the second female tag team to have won the WWE and NXT Women's Tag Team Championships. On 30 July, Fyre and Dawn successfully defended the titles against Lash Legend and Jakara Jackson of The Meta-Four at week one of NXT: The Great American Bash. They lost the titles back to Bianca Belair and Jade Cargill at Bash in Berlin on 31 August, ending their reign at 77 days. The Unholy Union effectively disbanded on 8 February 2025, when Dawn was released from her WWE contract.

==== The Green Regime (2025–2026) ====
On 7 March 2025 episode of SmackDown, Fyre assisted Women's United States Champion Chelsea Green to retain her title against Michin in a Philadelphia Street Fight match, aligning with Green and joining The Green Regime stable as a part of Green's "bodyguard team" The Secret Hervice (a pun on Secret Service) alongside Piper Niven. Fyre and Niven pursued the Women's Tag Team championship, but were unable to win gauntlet matches to challenge for the titles at WrestleMania or SummerSlam. Fyre would also compete in the Queen of the Ring and Speed Championship tournaments, though she was unable to win either. In September, Niven was taken off TV reportedly due to an injury, during which time Fyre started teaming with Green, and they challenged for the tag team championship on the September 19th edition of SmackDown, but were defeated by Charlotte Flair and Alexa Bliss. Fyre's last match in WWE was at WWE World at WrestleMania 42 - Tag 1 on 16th April, 2026 where she lost an NXT Women's Championship match against Tatum Paxley.

On 24 April 2026, Fyre's WWE contract expired, ending her seven-year tenure with the company.

=== Pro Wrestling: EVE (2026–present) ===
On 5 June 2026, Kerr, now known again as Kay Lee Ray, returned to Pro-Wrestling: EVE after seven years, where she defeated Molly Spartan in an open challenge. On 8 November, Ray defeated Kris Statlander to win the Pro-Wrestling: EVE Championship for the second time.

== Championships and accomplishments ==
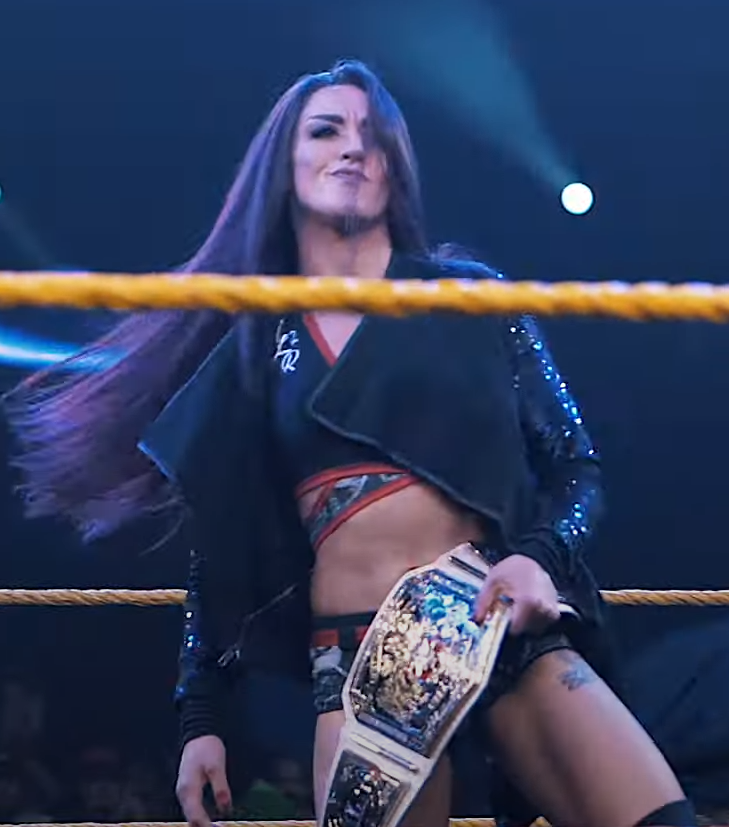
Ray had the longest reign as NXT UK Women's Champion

- What Culture Pro Wrestling/Defiant Wrestling
  - Defiant Women's Championship (1 time) (Note: What Culture Pro Wrestling was renamed to Defiant Wrestling during Ray's reign, thus the title was renamed to reflect the change.)
- Insane Championship Wrestling
  - Fierce Females/Scottish Women's Championship (1 time) (Note: The championship was renamed to the Scottish Women's Championship during Ray's reign.)
  - ICW Women's Championship (3 times)
  - Queen of Insanity (2019)
- Pro-Wrestling: EVE
  - Pro-Wrestling: EVE Championship (2 times, current)
- Pro Wrestling Illustrated
  - Ranked No. 18 of the top 100 female wrestlers in the PWI Women's 100 in 2020
  - Ranked No. 17 of the top 150 female wrestlers in the PWI Women's 150 in 2021
  - Ranked No. 53 of the top 100 Tag Teams in the PWI Tag Team 100 in 2022 – with Isla Dawn
- Shimmer Women Athletes
  - ChickFight Tournament (2015)
- Southside Wrestling Entertainment
  - Queen of Southside Championship (3 times)
  - SWE Speed King Championship (1 time)
- World of Sport Wrestling
  - WOS Women's Championship (1 time)
- World Wonder Ring Stardom
  - 5★Star GP Award (1 time)
    - 5★Star GP Technique Award (2016)
- WWE
  - WWE Women's Tag Team Championship (1 time) – with Isla Dawn
  - NXT UK Women's Championship (1 time)
  - NXT Women's Tag Team Championship (1 time, final) – with Isla Dawn
  - Women's Dusty Rhodes Tag Team Classic (2022) – with Io Shirai
  - Ranked No. 48 of the top 50 Greatest WWE Female Superstars of all time (2021)
  - WWE Women's Speed Championship #1 Contender Tournament (June 25–July 9, 2025)
