= Pro-Wrestling: EVE Championship =

Women's wrestling world championship

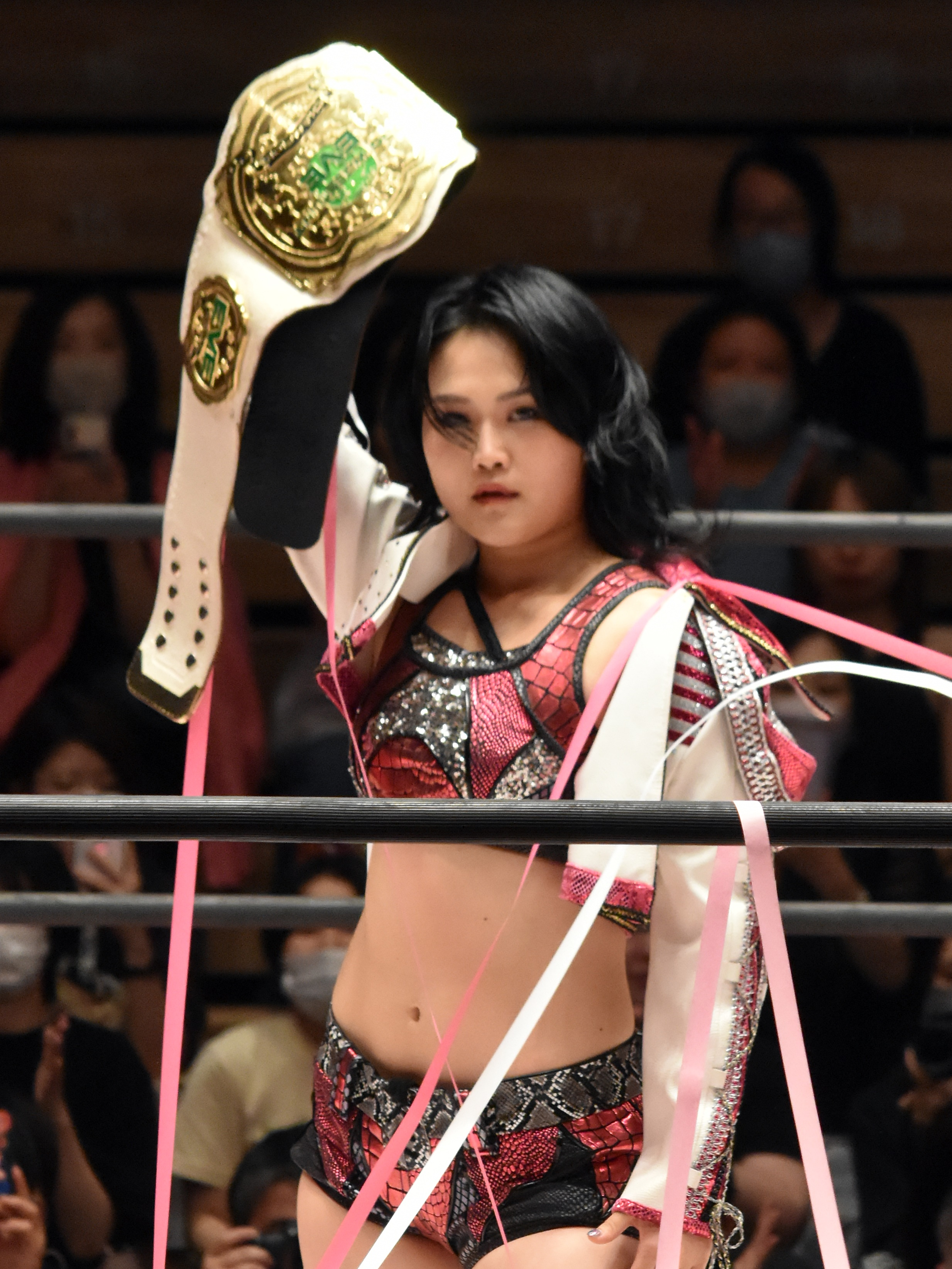
- Miyu Yamashita with the current title design

Details
- Promotion: Pro-Wrestling: EVE
- Date established: 8 April 2011
- Current champion: Kay Lee Ray
- Date won: 8 November 2026
Statistics
- First champion: Britani Knight
- Most reigns: Nikki Storm and Rhia O'Reilly (3 times)
- Longest reign: Rhia O'Reilly (789 days)
- Shortest reign: Nikki Storm and Viper (<1 day)
- Oldest champion: Nyla Rose (43 years, 20 days)
- Youngest champion: Britani Knight (18 years, 234 days)

The Pro-Wrestling: EVE Championship is a women's professional wrestling world championship created and promoted by the British professional wrestling promotion Pro-Wrestling: EVE. On 9 April 2011, Britani Knight became the inaugural champion after defeating Nikki Storm in the finals of an 21-woman tournament. Since then, there has been 26 reigns shared among 19 different wrestlers.Kay Lee Ray is the current champion in her second reign. She won the title by defeating Kris Statlander at Elite Ecounters II in Wolverhampton, England, on November 8, 2026.

== History ==
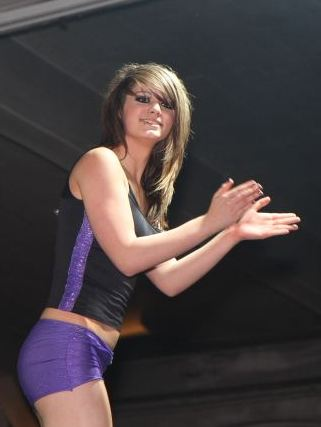
First champion, Britani Knight

On 8 April 2011, 21 wrestlers entered a two days tournament to crown the first Pro-Wrestling: EVE champion, which was eventually won by Britani Knight, after she defeated Nikki Storm in the finals to become the inaugural champion. On 20 May 2017, the current EVE Champion Rhia O'Reilly vacated the title after breaking both her leg and ankle. On 21 May, at Babes with Power, Sammii Jayne won the vacant championship after defeating Kay Lee Ray in a no disqualification match in the finals of a 16-woman tournament.

On 5 May 2018, EVE held their biggest event to date, Wrestle Queendom, when during the main event, Charlie Morgan defeated Jayne to win the EVE Championship.

== Reigns ==
As of 18 November 2026, there have been a total of 27 reigns shared between 21 wrestlers and one vacancy. Britani Knight was the inaugural champion, and also the youngest champion at 18 years old, while Nyla Rose is the oldest at 43 years old. Nikki Storm and Rhia O'Reilly hold the record of most reigns at three times. O'Reilly's third reign is the longest at 789 days, while Storm's first reign alongside the reigns of Viper and Alex Windsor lasted less than a day.

Kay Lee Ray is the current champion in her second reign. She won the title by defeating Kris Statlander at Elite Ecounters II in Wolverhampton, England, on November 8, 2026.

Key
| No. | Overall reign number |
| Reign | Reign number for the specific champion |
| Days | Number of days held |
| <1 | Reign lasted less than a day |
| + | Current reign is changing daily |

| No. | Champion | Championship change | | | Reign statistics | | Notes | Ref. |
| No. | Champion | Date | Event | Location | Reign | Days | Notes | Ref. |
|---|---|---|---|---|---|---|---|---|
| 1 | Britani Knight | 9 April 2011 | EVE Chapter 6: Return of the Jetta | Sudbury, Suffolk | 1 | 56 | Defeated Nikki Cross in the finals of an 21-woman tournament to become the inaugural champion. | |
| 2 | Jenny Sjödin | 4 June 2011 | XWA War on the Shore VII | Morecambe, Lancashire | 1 | 302 | | |
| 3 | Alpha Female | 1 April 2012 | BritWres-Fest 2012 | Southwark, London | 1 | 223 | | |
| 4 | Nikki Storm | 10 November 2012 | Wrestle-Fever | Sudbury, Suffolk | 1 | <1 | | |
| 5 | Emi Sakura | 10 November 2012 | Wrestle-Fever | Sudbury, Suffolk | 1 | 84 | | |
| 6 | Nikki Storm | 2 February 2013 | No Man's Land 2 | Preston, Lancashire | 2 | 665 | | |
| 7 | Rhia O'Reilly | 29 November 2014 | XWA We Need a Hero | Chelmsford, Essex | 1 | 456 | This was a no disqualification match. | |
| 8 | Nikki Storm | 28 February 2016 | XWA Goldrush | Colchester, Essex | 3 | 21 | This was a no disqualification and no countout match. | |
| 9 | Rhia O'Reilly | 20 March 2016 | Let's Make History! | Hackney Wick, Greater London | 2 | 426 | This was a two-out-of three-falls no disqualification match. | |
| — | Vacated | 20 May 2017 | — | — | — | — | Rhia O'Reilly vacated the championship after breaking her leg and ankle during a title defence. | |
| 10 | Sammii Jayne | 21 May 2017 | Babes with Power | Bethnal Green, Greater London | 1 | 349 | Defeated Kay Lee Ray in a no disqualification match in the finals of a 16-woman tournament to win the vacant championship. | |
| 11 | Charlie Morgan | 5 May 2018 | Wrestle Queendom | Bethnal Green, Greater London | 1 | 190 | | |
| 12 | Nina Samuels | 11 November 2018 | She-1 | Bethnal Green, Greater London | 1 | 118 | This was a three-way match, also involving Kay Lee Ray. | |
| 13 | Kay Lee Ray | 9 March 2019 | She Slams on Saturdays | London, England | 1 | 113 | | |
| 14 | Viper | 30 June 2019 | Wrestle Queendom 2 | Bethnal Green, London | 1 | <1 | | |
| 15 | Rhia O'Reilly | 30 June 2019 | Wrestle Queendom 2 | Bethnal Green, London | 3 | 789 | This was an impromptu match after Viper had won the championship. | |
| 16 | Jetta | 27 August 2021 | Wrestle Queendom 4 | London, England | 1 | 99 | This was a 28-woman Rumble match. | |
| 17 | Emersyn Jayne | 4 December 2021 | Aim to Misbehave | London, England | 2 | 63 | Jayne was previously known as Sammii Jayne. | |
| 18 | Jetta | 5 February 2022 | Slayers in Spandex 2 | London, England | 2 | 281 | | |
| 19 | Alex Windsor | 13 November 2022 | Wrestle Queendom 5 Show 1 | London, England | 1 | <1 | Won the title on show 1, lost the title on show 2. | |
| 20 | Miyu Yamashita | 13 November 2022 | Wrestle Queendom 5 Show 2 | London, England | 1 | 371 | | |
| 21 | Safire Reed | 19 November 2023 | Wrestle Queendom 6 Show 2 | London, England | 1 | 47 | | |
| 22 | Nina Samuels | 5 January 2024 | Multiverse Rumble | London, England | 2 | 483 | | |
| 23 | Nightshade | 2 May 2025 | EVE 134: Punkin' Instigators 15th Anniversary Spectacular | London, England | 1 | 113 | | |
| 24 | Nyla Rose | 23 August 2025 | EVE 138: EVE x The World | London, England | 1 | 76 | Aubrey Edwards from All Elite Wrestling (AEW) was the special referee. | |
| 25 | Rhio | 7 November 2025 | EVE 141: Elite Encounters | London, England | 1 | 121 | | |
| 26 | Session Moth Martina | 8 March 2026 | Wrestle Queendom 8 | London, England | 1 | 173 | | |
| 27 | Kris Statlander | 28 August 2026 | EVE 153: EVE x The World 2 | London, England | 1 | 72 | | |
| 28 | Kay Lee Ray | 8 November 2026 | Elite Encounters II | Wolverhampton, England | 2 | 10+ | | |

== Combined reigns ==
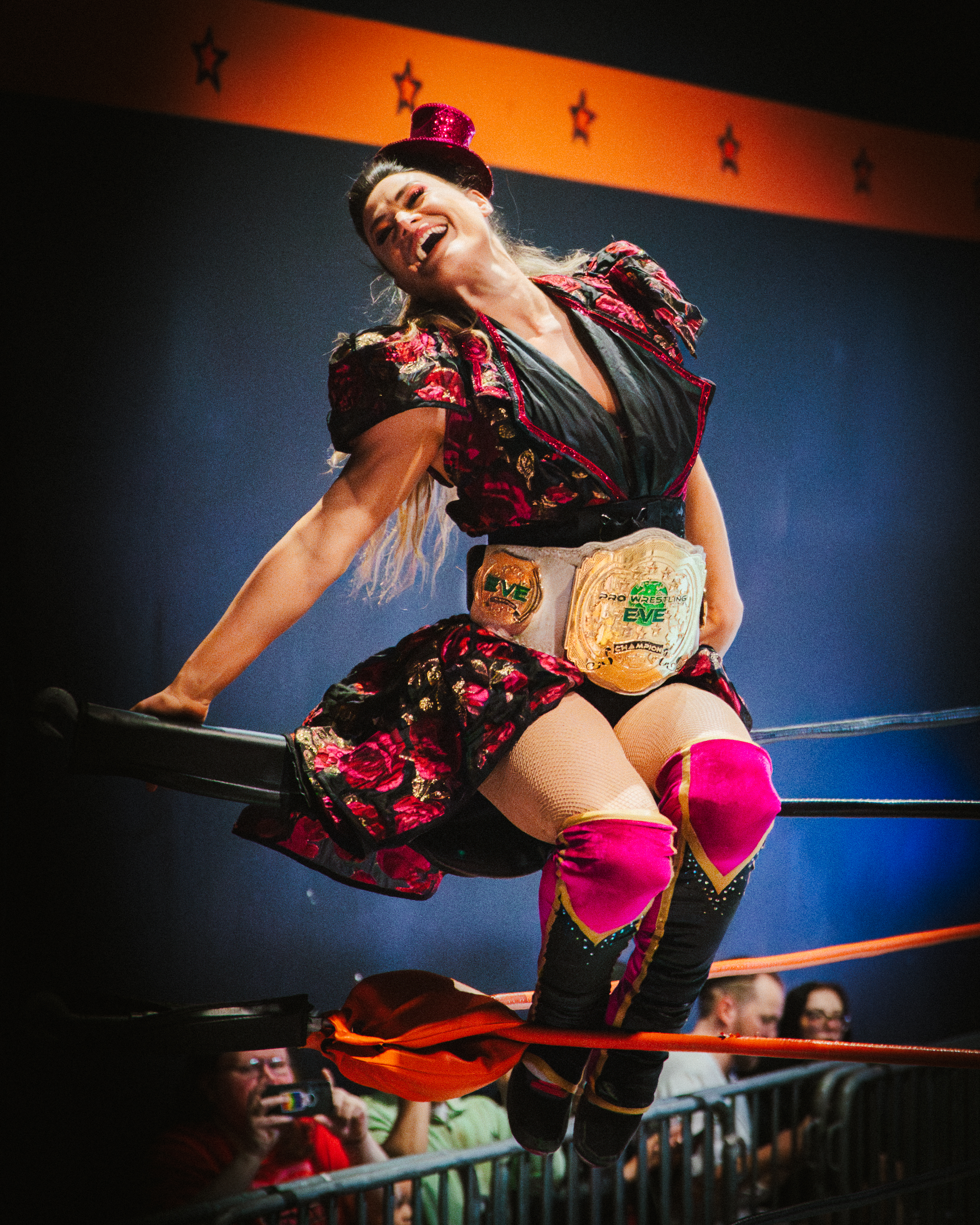
Former champion Nina Samuels

As of November 18, 2026.

| † | Indicates the current champion |

| Rank | Wrestler | No. of reigns | Combined days |
|---|---|---|---|
| 1 | Rhia O'Reilly | 3 | 1,671 |
| 2 | Nikki Storm | 3 | 686 |
| 3 | Nina Samuels | 2 | 601 |
| 4 | Emersyn/Sammii Jayne | 2 | 412 |
| 5 | Jetta | 2 | 380 |
| 6 | Miyu Yamashita | 1 | 371 |
| 7 | Jenny Sjödin | 1 | 302 |
| 8 | Alpha Female | 1 | 223 |
| 9 | Charlie Morgan | 1 | 190 |
| 10 | Session Moth Martina | 1 | 173 |
| 11 | Kay Lee Ray † | 2 | 123+ |
| 12 | Rhio | 1 | 121 |
| 13 | Nightshade | 1 | 113 |
| 14 | Emi Sakura | 1 | 84 |
| 15 | Nyla Rose | 1 | 76 |
| 16 | Kris Statlander | 1 | 72 |
| 17 | Britani Knight | 1 | 56 |
| 18 | Safire Reed | 1 | 47 |
| 19 | Alex Windsor | 1 | <1 |
| 19 | Viper | 1 | <1 |
