= Pro-Wrestling: EVE =

British professional wrestling promotion

- Acronym: EVE
- Founded: 2010
- Style: Women's professional wrestling
- Headquarters: United Kingdom
- Founder(s): Dann Read; Emily Read
- Owner(s): Dann Read; Emily Read
- Website: www.evewrestling.com

Pro-Wrestling: EVE (EVE) is a British independent women's professional wrestling promotion founded in 2010 and run by Dann and Emily Read. The promotion runs out of various venues in London, and also promotes events in theatres and town halls. It incorporates feminism, punk rock, and professional wrestling. It held the first all-female professional wrestling event to take place in London in March 2016.

== Spirit of EVE rules ==
From the beginning of EVE until EVE x The World 2 on 28 August 2026, unless otherwise stated, all EVE wrestling matches were conducted under a set of rules known as the Spirit of EVE. Under these rules, wrestlers are given significant leeway, so long as all competitors in the match are consenting. Low blows and foreign objects are not automatically grounds for disqualification, and there are no count-outs. Disqualification may still occur in the event of outside interference, attacking the referee, or disobeying the referee's instructions.

Under the Spirit of EVE rules, matches are won by:

- Pinning the opponent's shoulders for the referee's count of 3
- Making the opponent submit, either verbally or by tap out
- Referee stoppage
- Disqualification

As of 28 August 2026, the Spirit of EVE rules are only in play for matches in which the Spirit of EVE Championship is on the line.

== History ==
Pro-Wrestling: EVE was originally developed in 2010 by married couple Dann and Emily Read due to their desire to showcase women's professional wrestling. They also wanted to provide positive female role models for their daughter. Emily describes the promotion as a "feminist, grassroots promotion," as well as punk. In 2012, Pro-Wrestling: EVE was included in Vice magazine's documentary The British Wrestler.

The promotion was put on hold in 2012 while Emily was hospitalized due to suicidal inclinations under the Mental Health Act. She was later released from the hospital with a diagnosis of bipolar disorder. The Reads were able to re-open the promotion and had their first event since the hiatus in March 2016. It was the first all-female professional wrestling event to take place in London.

In 2017, both women's wrestling and British professional wrestling in general enjoyed a growth in popularity internationally. The promotion broadcasts shows on internet pay-per-view (iPPV).

On 1 February 2020, Emersyn Jayne (then known as Sammii Jayne) became the first-ever Triple Crown winner in the promotion's history, winning the Pro-Wrestling: EVE International Championship after defeating Jamie Hayter in a four-way match. Jayne was previously an EVE champion and then a Tag Team champion. Since April 2025, Will Ospreay has joined the creative team and became a producer for Pro-Wrestling: EVE.

=== Wrestle Queendom ===
On 5 May 2018, Pro-Wrestling: EVE held their biggest show yet, Wrestle Queendom. Not only was this the first all-women wrestling show to be held at the York Hall, it was the biggest all-women wrestling show in the United Kingdom's history.

No.	Results	Stipulations	Times
1	Squad Goals (Addy Starr, Emi Sakura, Laura Di Matteo and Rhia O'Reilly) defeated The Deserving (Blue Nikita, Charli Evans, Jamie Hayter and Jayla Dark) by submission	WarGames match	21:01
2	Jetta vs. Kris Wolf ended in a draw	Wild Card qualifying match with Erin Angel as special guest referee	8:10
3	Nina Samuels defeated Jetta, Kasey Owens, Kris Wolf, Leah Owens, Livvii Grace and Millie McKenzie	Wild Card ladder match	10:18
4	Kay Lee Ray defeated Meiko Satomura (with Emi Sakura)	Singles match	15:33
5	Aja Kong (with Emi Sakura) defeated Viper	Singles match	9:49
6	Charlie Morgan defeated Emersyn Jayne (c)	Singles match for the Pro-Wrestling: EVE Championship	20:29
(c) / – the champion(s) heading into the match

== Current champions ==
Championship	Current champion(s)	Reign	Date won	Days held	Location	Notes
Pro-Wrestling: EVE Championship	Kay Lee Ray	2	8 November 2026	9+	Wolverhampton, England	Defeated Kris Statlander at EVE Elite Encounters II.
Pro-Wrestling: EVE International Championship	Marina Shafir	1	8 November 2026	9+	Wolverhampton, England	Defeated Miyu Yamashitaat EVE Elite Encounters II.
Pro-Wrestling: EVE Tag Team Championship	Hai High Mate (Maika and Hanako)	1 (1, 1)	8 November 2026	9+	Wolverhampton, England	Defeated Hyperactive (Safire Reed and Anita Vaughan) at EVE Elite Encounters II.
Spirit of EVE Championship	Skye Blue	1	8 November 2026	9+	Wolverhampton, England	Defeated Lucy Deathmatch at EVE Elite Encounters II.

=== Spirit of EVE Championship ===
Spirit of EVE Championship

Details
- Promotion: Pro-Wrestling: EVE
- Date established: August 2026
- Current champion: Skye Blue
- Date won: 8 November 2026
Statistics
- First champion: Lucy Deathmatch
- Most reigns: All titleholders (1 reign)
- Longest reign: Lucy Deathmatch (72 Days)

The Spirit of EVE Championship is a women's professional wrestling championship owned by the English promotion Pro-Wrestling: EVE. The current champion is Skye Blue, who is in her first reign. She won the title by defeating previous champion Lucy Deathmatch at EVE Elite Encounters II on 8 November 2026 in Wolverhampton, England.

Key
No.	Overall reign number
Reign	Reign number for the specific champion
Days	Number of days held
+	Current reign is changing daily

No.	Champion	Championship change			Reign statistics		Notes	Ref.
No.	Champion	Date	Event	Location	Reign	Days	Notes	Ref.
1	Lucy Deathmatch	28 August 2026	EVE 153: EVE x The World 2	London, England	1	72	Defeated Emersyn Jayne and Skye Blue to become the inaugural champion.	
2	Skye Blue	8 November 2026	Elite Encounters II	Wolverhampton, England	1	9+	This was a Deathmatch	

== Roster ==
=== Current ===
- Alexxis Falcon
- Chantal Jordan
- Cory Zero
- Emersyn Jayne
- Emi Sakura
- Jetta
- JGU
- Kasey Owens
- Kris Statlander
- Lana Austin
- Laura Di Matteo
- Lizzy Evo
- Lucy Sky
- Martina
- Millie McKenzie
- Miyu Yamashita
- Nightshade
- Nina Samuels
- Safire Reed
- Session Moth Martina
- Rhia O'Reilly
- Rhio
- Skye Smitson
- Yuu
- Zoe Lucas

=== Alumni ===
- Addy Starr
- Alex Windsor
- Alpha Female
- Angelina Love
- Blue Nikita
- Britani Knight
- Carmel Jacob
- Charlie Morgan
- Charli Evans
- Debbie Dahmer
- Debbie Keitel
- Erin Angel
- Hannah Blossom
- Holly Blossom
- Ivy
- Isla Dawn
- Jamie Hayter
- Jenny Sjödin
- Kay Lee Ray
- Kris Wolf
- Leah Owens
- Livvii Grace
- Manami Toyota
- Meiko Satomura
- Nikki Storm
- Nixon Newell
- Pollyanna
- Rayne Leverkusen
- Riho
- Sadie Gibbs
- Utami Hayashishita
- Syuri
- Valkyrie
- Viper

== Hall of Fame ==
Year	Image	Ring name (Birth name)	Inducted by	Pro-Wrestling: EVE recognized accolades
2018	—N/a	Klondyke Kate (Jayne Porter)	Dann Read, Emily Read and Rhia O'Reilly	Inaugural inductee into the Hall of Fame. Primarily wrestled for World of Sport in the 1980s. Kate was inducted on EVE Shevivor Series on 8 December 2018
2022		Chigusa Nagayo (Chigusa Nagayo)	Dann Read	One of the legendary Crush Gals, the most popular women wrestlers of all time, Chigusa was inducted following the She-1 tournament on 19 June 2022.
2023		Emi Sakura (Emi Motokawa)	Dann Read	One-time Pro-Wrestling: EVE Champion.
