= Miyu Yamashita =

Japanese professional wrestler (born 1995)

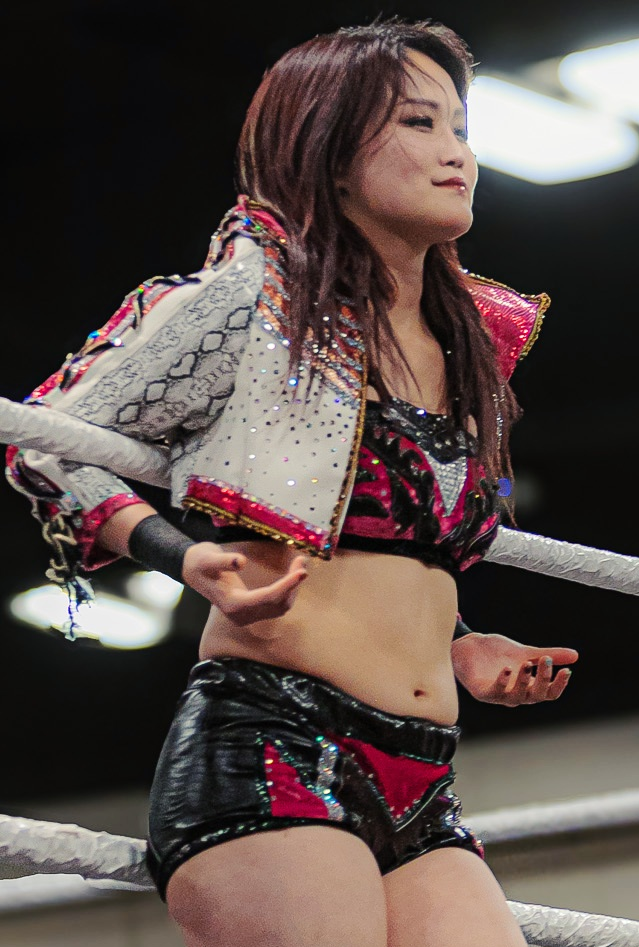
- Yamashita in March 2026

Personal information
- Born: Miyu Yamashita (山下実優, Yamashita Miyū); March 17, 1995 (age 31) Fukuoka, Japan

Professional wrestling career
- Ring name: Miyu Yamashita
- Billed height: 165 cm (5 ft 5 in)
- Trained by: Mikami
- Debut: August 17, 2013

Miyu Yamashita (山下実優, Yamashita Miyū; born March 17, 1995) is a Japanese professional wrestler. She is signed to Tokyo Joshi Pro Wrestling, where she is a four-time Princess of Princess Champion and a two-time Princess Tag Team Champion. She also makes appearances for All Elite Wrestling (AEW) and Ring of Honor (ROH).

Yamashita was trained by DDT Pro Wrestling's Kyohei Mikami, and made her debut in August 2013 as one of the first members of DDT's all female Tokyo Joshi Pro sister promotion. Yamashita was pushed as the top star of Tokyo Joshi Pro, and became the first ever Princess of Princess Champion on January 4, 2016. Yamashita has gone on to hold the title for a combined total of 1,239 days over the course of four title reigns, both records, and has come to be recognized as the promotion's ace.

== Professional wrestling career ==
=== Tokyo Joshi Pro-Wrestling (2013–present) ===
Yamashita trained in Kyokushin Karate and Catch Wrestling from a young age and originally had hopes of being an idol, and took part in many auditions for idol groups, though she struggled to get anywhere. She was eventually introduced to professional wrestler Kyohei Mikami, who asked if she would be interested in training to join Dramatic Dream Team's new sister promotion, Tokyo Joshi Pro-Wrestling (TJPW). Yamashita accepted the offer and moved to Tokyo at age 17 to begin training under Mikami shortly after. In TJP's early years, it was a small promotion that mainly ran shows alongside live music and other live performances. Despite being a small promotion, Yamashita was still being pushed as the future top star of the promotion, and when TJP finally started to run their own full shows, Yamashita took her position at the top of the card. She became known for her strong kicks and karate based offence, earning the nickname "Pink Striker".

On January 4, 2016, at TJP's biggest show to date, Yamashita defeated longtime rival Shoko Nakajima to become the first ever Tokyo Princess of Princess Champion. She held the title until September when she was defeated by Yuu. In August 2017, she received her first singles match against Sendai Girls' Pro Wrestling's Meiko Satomura, but was defeated. On January 4, 2018, Yamashita got one more chance to win back the Tokyo Princess of Princess Championship, and defeated Reika Saiki to win the championship for a second time. Yamashita retained the title throughout 2018, defeating the likes of Yuna Manase, Veda Scott, Priscilla Kelly, Yuu, Maho Kurone and Rika Tatsumi. On January 4, 2019, she defeated Maki Ito to mark one year as champion, the longest in the titles history. At WWNLive Mercury Rising 2019, Yamashita defeated Allysin Kay in a title vs title match to win the Shine Championship. On May 4, 2021, Yamashita defeated Rika Tatsumi to claim the Princess of Princess Championship for a third time. On November 13, Yamashita became the 14th Pro Wrestling EVE Champion, defeating Alex Windsor for the Pro-Wrestling: EVE Championship on show 2 of WrestleQueendom 5 in London England.

On August 13, 2023, Yamashita won the Tokyo Princess Cup after defeating Yuki Kamifuku in the finals. On October 9, at Wrestle Princess IV, Yamashita defeated Mizuki to win the Princess of Princess Championship for the fourth time. On March 31, 2024, at Grand Princess '24, Yamashita dropped the title to Miu Watanabe, ending her fourth reign at 174 days.

=== All Elite Wrestling / Ring of Honor (2022–present) ===
Yamashita performs a "skull kick" to The Ultra Violette at a House of Glory event in May 2023.

Yamashita made her All Elite Wrestling (AEW) on the June 6, 2022 episode of Dark: Elevation, teaming with Skye Blue in a losing effort against Nyla Rose and Serena Deeb. On July 9 at TJPW's event Summer Sun Princess. Yamashita defeated Thunder Rosa in an AEW Women's World Championship Eliminator match, earning a future title match against Rosa. On July 27 at Dynamite: Fight for the Fallen, Yamashita failed to win the title from Rosa. On the March 30, 2023 episode of ROH Honor Club TV, Yamashita made her debut for AEW's sister promotion Ring of Honor (ROH) with a victory over Shazza McKenzie. The following week, she fought Athena for the ROH Women's World Championship in a losing effort. On the April 30, 2025 episode of Dynamite, Yamashita returned to AEW, where she faced regining AEW Women's World Champion "Timeless" Toni Storm in another title eliminator match, but was defeated. On July 11, 2025, Yamashita returned to ROH at Supercard of Honor, competing in a Worldwide Women's Wild Card four-way match for the interim ROH Women's World Television Championship, but was pinned by Mina Shirakawa.

=== Impact Wrestling / Total Nonstop Action Wrestling (2023–2024) ===
On March 30, 2023 (which was taped on March 25), Yamashita made her Impact Wrestling debut with a victory over Killer Kelly. That same day at Multiverse United, she competed in a four-way match where the winner will be added to the Impact Knockouts World Championship match at Rebellion, which was won by Deonna Purrazzo.

On April 25, 2024 (which was taped on April 21), Yamashita made her return to TNA, confronting Knockouts World Champion Jordynne Grace after it was announced her match next week will be for the title. On the following week's TNA iMPACT! (which was also taped on April 21), Yamashita fought Grace in a losing effort.

== Other ventures ==
Yamashita has appeared on two TV programs, the 2019 miniseries Prescription Police and the 2020 episode "Ekitai Rashku" of the Sony Pictures Television production S.W.A.T. (2017).

== Championships and accomplishments ==
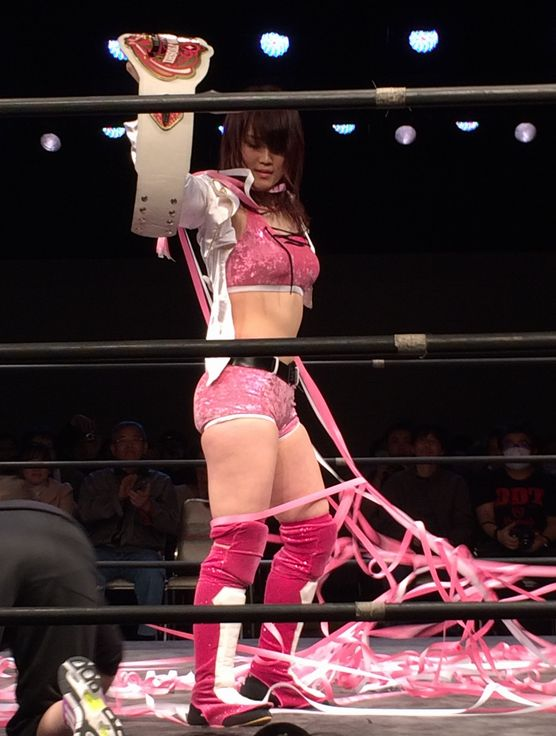
In TJPW, Yamashita is a four-time and inaugural Princess of Princess Champion.

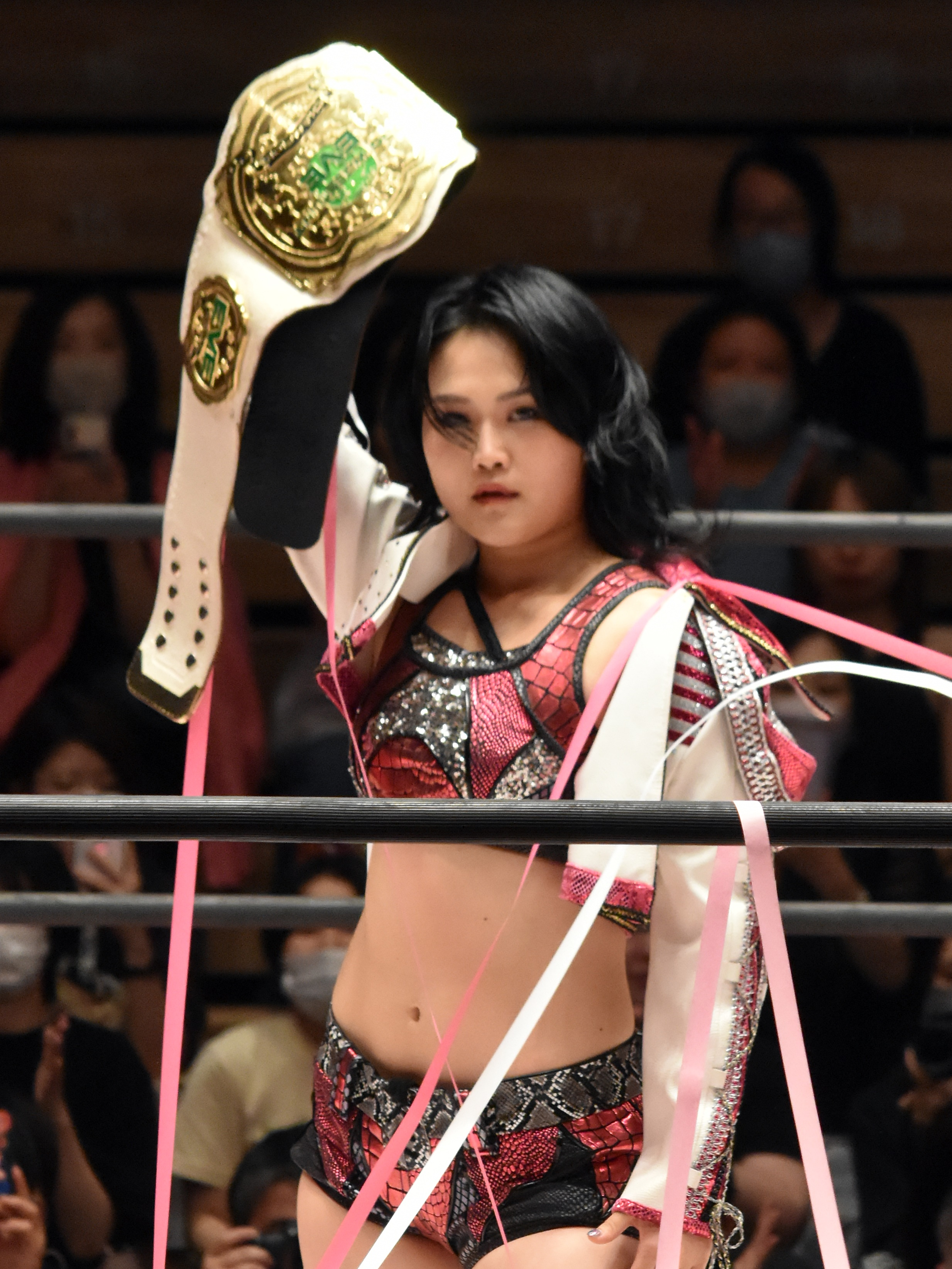
In Pro-Wrestling: EVE, Yamashita is a former Pro-Wrestling: EVE Champion.

- Capital Championship Wrestling
  - CCW Championship (1 time)
  - CCW Network Championship (1 time)
- DDT Pro-Wrestling
  - DDT Universal Championship (1 time)
  - Ironman Heavymetalweight Championship (8 times)
- International Wrestling Association Thailand
  - IWA Japan Setup World Tag Team Championship (1 time) – with Kaya Toribami
- Pro-Wrestling: EVE
  - Pro-Wrestling: EVE Championship (1 time)
  - Pro-Wrestling: EVE International Championship (1 time, current)
- Pro Wrestling Illustrated
  - Ranked No. 12 of the top 150 female wrestlers in the PWI Women's 150 in 2022
- Shine Wrestling
  - Shine Championship (1 time)
- Spark Joshi Puroresu of America
  - Spark Joshi World Championship (1 time, inaugural)
- Tokyo Joshi Pro Wrestling
  - Princess of Princess Championship (4 times, inaugural) (Note: Yamashita's first two reigns were when the championship was called the Tokyo Princess of Princess Championship.)
  - Princess Tag Team Championship (2 times) – with Maki Itoh
  - "Futari wa Princess" Max Heart Tournament (2023) – with Maki Itoh
  - Tokyo Princess Cup (2023)
