= Alpha Female =

German professional wrestler

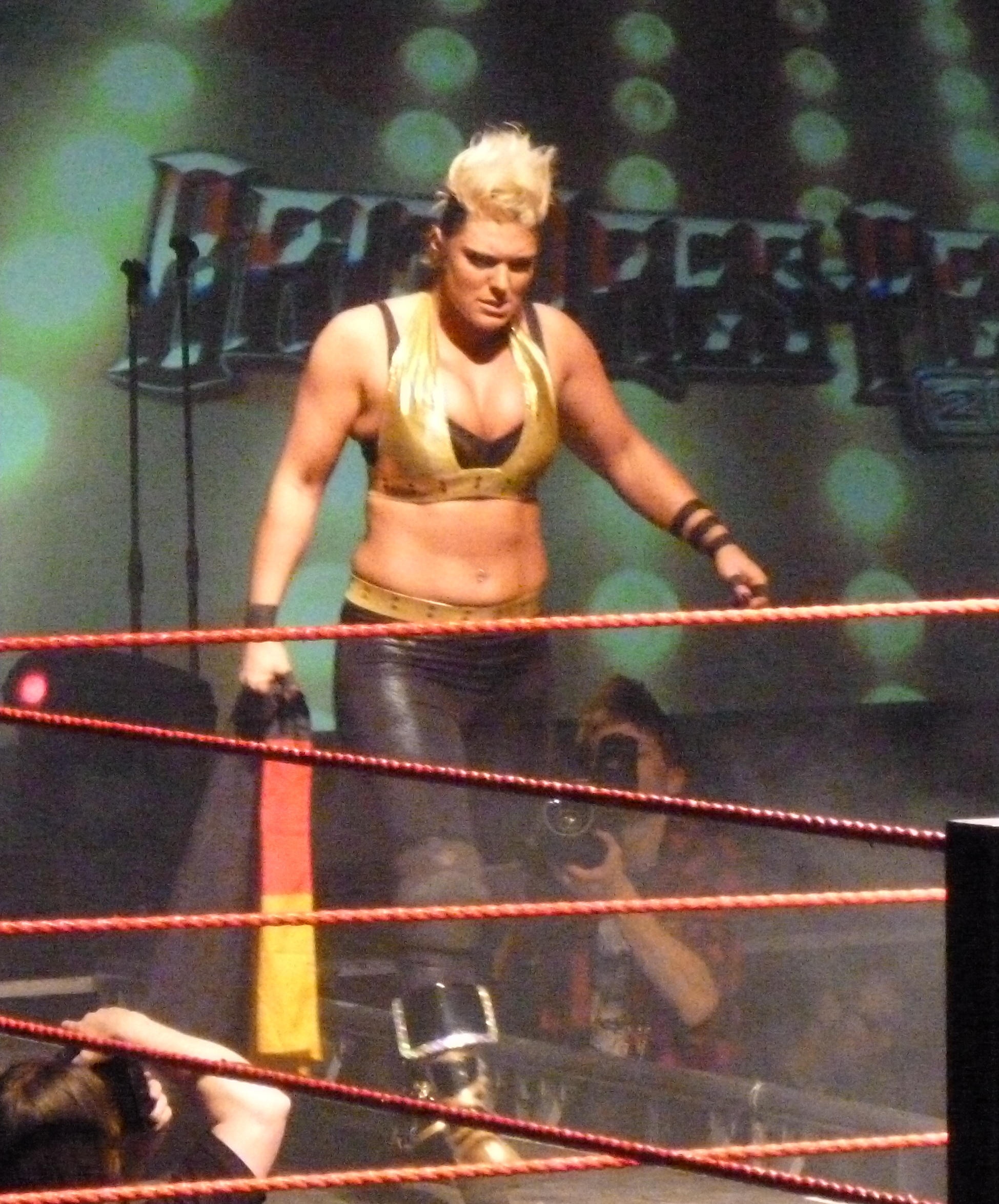
- Alpha Female in 2012

Personal information
- Born: Marie Kristin Gabert; June 4, 1982 (age 44)

Professional wrestling career
- Ring name(s): Alpha Female; Jazzy Bi; Jazzy Gabert
- Billed height: 6 ft 1 in (185 cm)
- Billed weight: 194 lb (88 kg)
- Billed from: Berlin, Germany
- Trained by: Joe E. Legend; Murat Bosporus; WWE UK Performance Center
- Debut: 7 April 2001

Marie Kristin Gabert (born June 4, 1982) is a German professional wrestler and former professional powerlifter, strongwoman, bodybuilder, and mixed martial artist under the names Alpha Female and Jazzy Gabert. She is best known on the independent scene, where she has wrestled for World Wonder Ring Stardom and Total Nonstop Action Wrestling (TNA).

== Professional wrestling career ==
=== Training and Early Career (2001–2014) ===
Gabert started training in 2001 under the wing of Joe E. Legend and Murat Bosporus, as well as other trainers from the German Wrestling Federation (GWF) promotion. Her first match took place on 7 April, where she faced Wesna and Blue Nikita in a three-way match under the ring name Jazzy Bi for the NWA Germany European Women's Championship, a match won by the champion Wesna. Gabert continued competing in the GWF. On 20 April 2002 Gabert teamed with Ahmed Chaer and Chris The Bambikiller in a six-person tag team ladder match against Wesna, Carlos Gallero and Fake Dog, which they would lose. Two months later on 22 June, Gabert teamed with Blue Nikita in a tag team match against Wesna and Missy Blond, which they would lose. She would continue to wrestle against Nikita and Wesna in Germany in promotions such as Professional Wrestling Alliance (PWA) and European Wrestling Association (EWA) from 2003 to 2006.

Gabert made her debut for the Queens of Chaos promotion, located in Paris, France on 11 December 2006 competing in the one-night tournament to determine the number one contender for the Queen of Chaos championship. She defeated Pandora in the first round match, only to lose in the finals to April Hunter during a four-corners elimination match. Gabert returned to the promotion a month later on 21 January 2007, unsuccessfully challenging Hunter for the Queen of Chaos championship in an Iron Man match. Two months later on 18 March, Gabert once again lost to Hunter in a title match. On 1 July in the Fighting Spirit Federation promotion, Gabert unsuccessfully challenged Minx for the Queens of Chaos European championship. On 15 September, she defeated Allison Danger and Jetta to become the number one contender for the Queens of Chaos championship, and defeating Wild Xenia later in a singles match.

In January, 2008, she won her first title -the EWE women's championship- in Bilbao, Spain against the Italian wrestler Lisa Schianto. She retained her EWE title in San Fernando, Cádiz, Spain (April 14, 2008) against Croatian wrestler Wesna Busic and retained too in Seville, Spain (June 28, 2008) in front of the Swedish Jenny Sjödin.

From 15 March to 19 March 2008, Gabert took part in the American Wrestling Rampage tour in Ireland, competing against Jenny Sjödin and Laura Wellings. She returned to the promotion for a tour in France, from April to November, facing Lisa Fury in both winning and losing efforts. After a break, she returned a year later in November 2009, defeating Portia Perez three times from 27 to 29 November. In January 2014, it was announced that Gabert will make her debut for the Women Superstars Uncensored (WSU) promotion under her Alpha Female ringname, and was set to face Jessicka Havok on February 9 at WSU's Mutiny. If Havok wins her match against Shanna the previous night, during Gabert and Havok's match the WSU Championship might be on the line.

=== Pro-Wrestling: EVE (2010–2013) ===
On 8 May 2010, Gabert made her debut for women's wrestling promotion Pro-Wrestling: EVE under the ringname Alpha Female in England defeating Becky James and Janey B in two separate matches. Five months later on 16 October, Gabert once again defeated Destiny and Janey B in two separate matches. On 8 April 2011, Gabert participated in a tournament to crown the promotion's first Pro-Wrestling: Eve Champion, defeating Carmel Jacob, Em Jay and Kay Lee Ray in the first round and Shanna in the quarter final, only to lose in the semi-finals to Nikki Storm. The next day on 9 April, Gabert teamed with Janey B and defeated The Glamour Gym (Carmel Jacob and Sara Marie Taylor) in a winning effort. On 8 October, Gabert defeated Hikaru Shida in a singles match, and on the next day defeating Rhia O'Reilly and Viper in a three-way match and Sara Marie Taylor in a singles match. On 18 February 2012, Gabert faced Jenny Sjödin for the Pro-Wrestling: Eve Championship, but the match ended in a double count-out. Two months later on 1 April, Gabert defeated Sjödin to win the championship. Her first title defense took place on 14 July, where she defeated Ayesha Ray in a no-disqualifications match. On November 11, Gabert lost the title to Nikki Storm, ending her reign at 223 days. Gabert continued to make sporadic appearances on the promotion and wrestling the likes of Carmel Jacob, Kay Lee Ray, Sara Marie Taylor and Shanna, with the last one appearing on 25 May 2013 where she lost to Lee Ray.

=== World Wonder Ring Stardom (2012–2016, 2022–present) ===
Gabert made her debut in Japan on 7 April 2012 at a World Wonder Ring Stardom event. On 17 March 2013, she defeated Nanae Takahashi for the World of Stardom Championship. She continued to wrestle for the promotion in several singles and tag team matches, before losing the championship to Io Shirai on 29 April. Gabert returned to the promotion, four months later on 17 August, facing Hiroyo Matsumoto in a match that ended in a draw. In September she competed in the Stardom 5STAR Grand Prix tournament, defeating Kairi Hojo, Io Shirai and Dark Angel, before losing to Takahashi in the finals. Two months later, on 4 November, Gabert teamed with Kyoko Kimura and The Female Predator "Amazon" and defeated Kairi Hojo, Kaori Yoneyama and Yuhi to win the Artist of Stardom Championship, only to lose it to the team of Hiroyo Matsumoto, Mayu Iwatani and Miho Wakizawa on 29 December, ending their reign at 55 days. Gabert also competed in the Goddesses of Stardom tag team tournament, teaming with Amazon and defeating three different teams, and losing to Act Yasukawa and Kyoko Kimura in the finals. On 26 January 2014, Gabert teamed with Kimura and defeated Miho Wakizawa and Nanae Takahashi to win the Goddesses of Stardom Championship. They lost the title to Kairi Hojo and Nanae Takahashi on 10 August. Following the match, Gabert and Kimura broke up their partnership.

Gabert returned to Stardom in March 2016, unsuccessfully challenging Io Shirai for the World of Stardom Championship on March 26. On May 21, Gabert took part in a tournament to crown the inaugural SWA World Champion, but was defeated in her first round match by Santana Garrett.

At Stardom in Showcase vol.2, a non-canon event produced by World Wonder Ring Stardom on September 25, 2022, the chief executive producer Rossy Ogawa was a victim of various "grim reaper masked silhouettes" who kept attacking him. For the event, he established Queen's Quest's leader Utami Hayashishita, Lady C and God's Eye's leader Syuri as his bodyguards. On the other corner, Yuu who was the first silhouette and unmasked at the previous Showcase event has also established two tag partners presented under the same masks. They were revealed to be Nanae Takahashi and Yuna Manase on the event's night as they succeeded in defeating Rossy's Bodyguard Army. Minutes later, a video of Gabert was played, showing her criticizing the current situation in Stardom as she was announcing her return to the company on October 23, 2022 for the IWGP Women's Championship tournament. Together with Takahashi, Manase and Yuu, Alpha Female officially formed the "Neo Stardom Army" unit and declared the destruction over Stardom's roster. Gabert succeeded in defeating Ava White in the first rounds of the IWGP Women's Championship tournament from Royal Quest II, but fell short ti Kairi in the semifinals from October 23, 2022. At Hiroshima Goddess Festival on November 3, 2022, Gabert unsuccessfully challenged Mayu Iwatani for the SWA World Championship.

=== Total Nonstop Action Wrestling (2014) ===
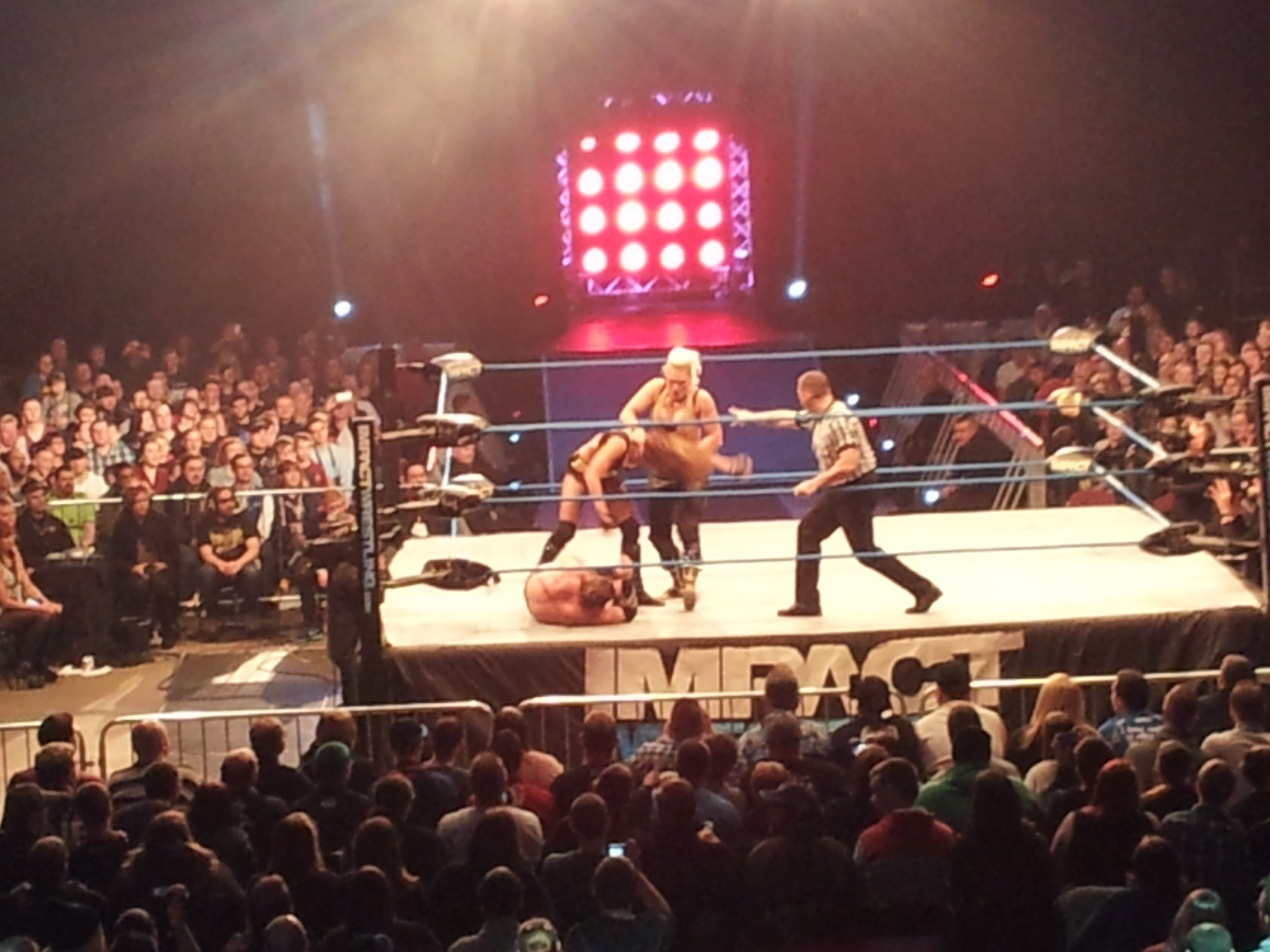
Gabert debuted in TNA in 2014, attacking Velvet Sky

In January 2013, Gabert received a tryout in the Total Nonstop Action Wrestling (TNA) promotion during their annual tour in England. A year later, Gabert returned to the company and competed in a match against ODB at TNA Xplosion but the match ended in a no contest after both women shoved down the referee, and later made her televised debut as a heel by attacking Velvet Sky and aligning herself with Chris Sabin. On the February 27 episode of Impact Wrestling, Gabert teamed with Lei'D Tapa in a winning effort against Velvet Sky and Madison Rayne. The following week, Gabert was pinned by Sky in a tag team match that also involved Lei'D Tapa, Gail Kim, Madison Rayne, and ODB, ending their rivalry. She received an offer from TNA, but she choose to work in Japan.

=== WWE (2017–2020) ===
==== Mae Young Classic (2017–2018) ====
In June 2017, Gabert was announced for the Mae Young Classic under the name Jazzy Gabert. She was eliminated from the tournament in the first round on July 13 by Abbey Laith. She then appeared in a dark match on July 14, 2017 in a six-woman tag team match, teaming with Tessa Blanchard and Kay Lee Ray in defeating Santana Garrett, Marti Belle and Sarah Logan. In December 2017, Gabert stated that WWE had rescinded their contract offer to her after discovering that she had three herniated discs in her neck. On March 13, 2018, after successful surgery, she stated that she would try once again to get in WWE, stating "I’m going to send my MRI to WWE doctors, and if they say you are good to go, I will give it another try. To be honest, I’m not sure if I want to do independent wrestling anymore because I’ve been doing that for 17 years. With independent wrestling, it’s very difficult." In July, she was cleared for action.

==== NXT UK (2019–2020) ====
On January 12, 2019, Gabert appeared along with Kay Lee Ray in the audience at NXT UK TakeOver: Blackpool, announced as women who will be involved in the brand in the future. On the May 15, 2019 episode of NXT UK, Gabert made her debut during a match between Killer Kelly and Xia Brookside, attacking the two in the process and aligning herself with Jinny as her enforcer. In January 2020, after being told there was nothing the writers had for her on Raw or SmackDown, she chose not to renew her contract, and started her own promotion called SIRIUS Sports Entertainment.

== Championships and accomplishments ==
- Association Biterroise de Catch
  - ABC Women's Title #1 Contendership Tournament (2013)
- Championship Of Wrestling
  - cOw Ladies Championship (2 times)
- Deutsche Wrestling Allianz
  - DWA Ladies Championship (1 time)
- Pro Evolution Wrestling
  - Pro Evolution Women's Championship (1 time)
- Pro-Wrestling: EVE
  - Pro-Wrestling: EVE Championship (1 time)
- Eventos de Wrestling Europeo
  - EWE Female Championship (1 time, inaugural, final)
- Pro Wrestling Illustrated
  - Ranked No. 48 of the top 50 female singles wrestlers in the PWI Female 50 in 2017
- SIRIUS Sports Entertainment
  - SIRIUS Women's Championship (1 time, current)
- Swiss Wrestling Entertainment
  - SWE Ladies Championship (1 time)
- Turkish Power Wrestling
  - Ladies' Crown (1 time)
- Westside Xtreme Wrestling
  - Femmes Fatales Tournament (2016)
- World Wonder Ring Stardom
  - Artist of Stardom Championship (1 time) – with The Female Predator "Amazon" and Kyoko Kimura
  - Goddesses of Stardom Championship (1 time) – with Kyoko Kimura
  - World of Stardom Championship (1 time)
  - 5★Star GP Award (1 time)
    - 5★Star GP Finalist Award (2013)

== Mixed martial arts career ==
Jazzy Gabert
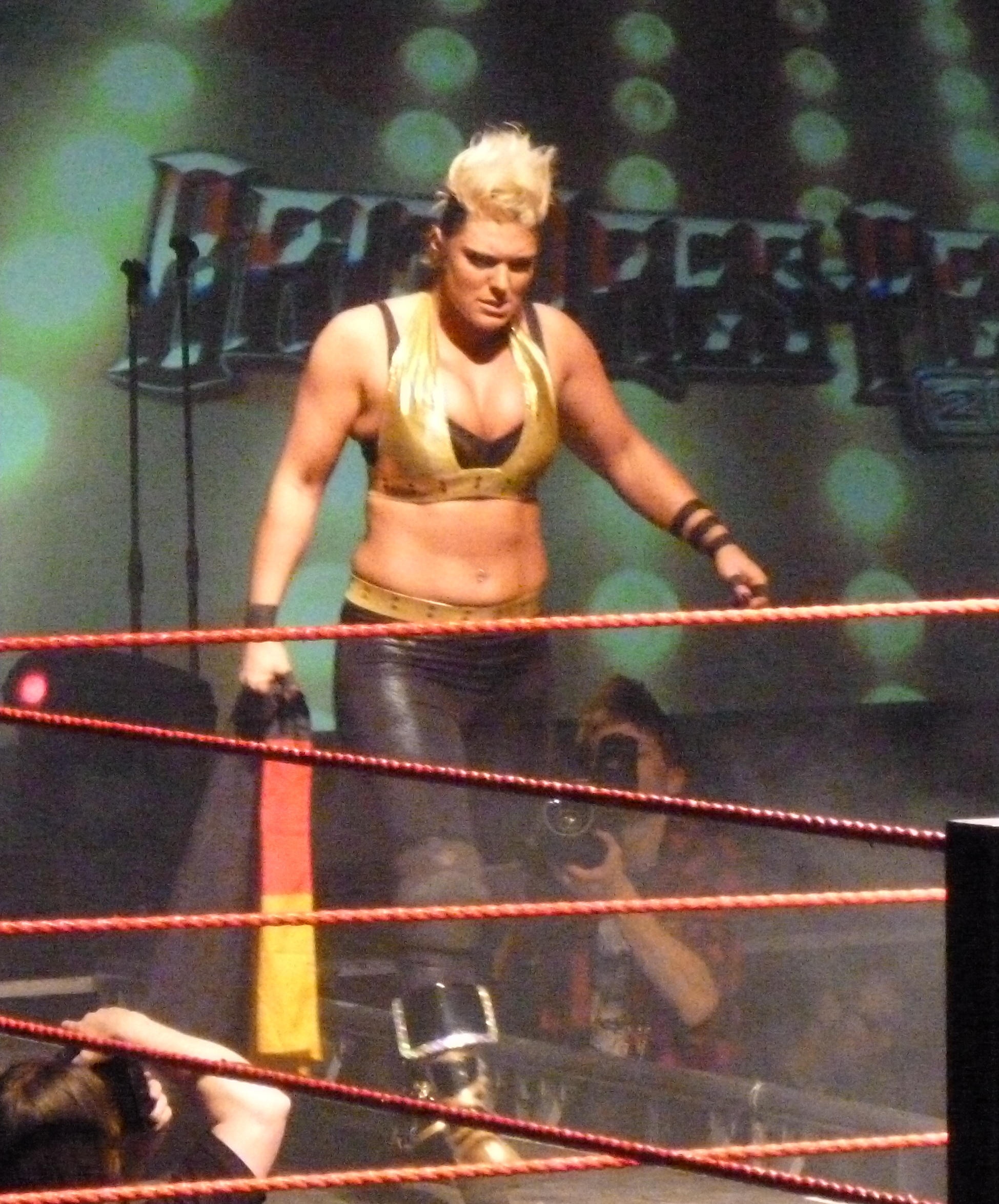
- Born: Marie Kristin Gabert; June 4, 1982 (age 44); German
- Height: 6 ft 0 in (1.83 m)
- Weight: 200 lb (91 kg; 14 st)
- Division: Middleweight, Light Heavyweight
- Reach: 68 in (173 cm)
- Stance: Orthodox
- Team: Planet Eater

Mixed martial arts record
- Total: 2
- Wins: 1
- By knockout: 1
- By decision: 0
- Losses: 1
- By knockout: 0
- By submission: 1
- No contests: 0

Other information
- Mixed martial arts record from Sherdog

Gabert made her mixed martial arts debut on October 15, 2016, defeating Manuela Kuhse via technical knockout.

Gabert faced Reina Miura on April 16, 2017, at Rizin FF 5: Sakura. She lost the fight by second-round submission.

== Mixed martial arts record ==
Professional record breakdown
2 matches	1 win	1 loss
By knockout	1	0
By submission	0	1
By decision	0	0
Draws	0	

Res.	Record	Opponent	Method	Event	Date	Round	Time	Location	Notes
Loss	1–1	Reina Miura	Submission (armbar)	Rizin FF 5: Sakura	April 16, 2017	2	4:54	Yokohama, Japan	
Win	1–0	Manuela Kuhse	TKO (punches)	IFO Europe 3: Crawford vs. Grabinski	October 15, 2016	2	2:42	Potsdam, Germany	
