= AEW Dynasty (2024) =

All Elite Wrestling pay-per-view event

Dynasty
- Promotional poster featuring various AEW wrestlers
- Promotion: All Elite Wrestling
- Date: April 21, 2024
- City: St. Louis, Missouri
- Venue: Chaifetz Arena
- Attendance: 6,619
- Buy rate: 122,000

Pay-per-view chronology
← Previous; Revolution	Next → Double or Nothing

Dynasty chronology
← Previous; First	Next → 2025

The 2024 Dynasty was a professional wrestling pay-per-view (PPV) event produced by All Elite Wrestling (AEW). It was the inaugural Dynasty event and took place on April 21, 2024, at the Chaifetz Arena in St. Louis, Missouri, marking AEW's first pay-per-view event to be held in Missouri.

Twelve matches were contested at the event, including three on the "Zero Hour" pre-show. In the main event, Swerve Strickland defeated Samoa Joe to win the AEW World Championship. In other prominent matches, The Young Bucks (Matthew Jackson and Nicholas Jackson) defeated FTR (Dax Harwood and Cash Wheeler) in a tournament final Ladder match to win the vacant AEW World Tag Team Championship and become record-setting three-time champions, Will Ospreay defeated Bryan Danielson in a highly acclaimed "dream match", and Willow Nightingale defeated Julia Hart to win the AEW TBS Championship. The event also featured the return of Jack Perry, who had been absent from AEW programming since a legitimate backstage altercation at All In London in August 2023.

The event was praised by fans and journalists, particularly for the Will Ospreay vs. Bryan Danielson match. Some referred to the match as one of the greatest wrestling matches of all time.

== Production ==
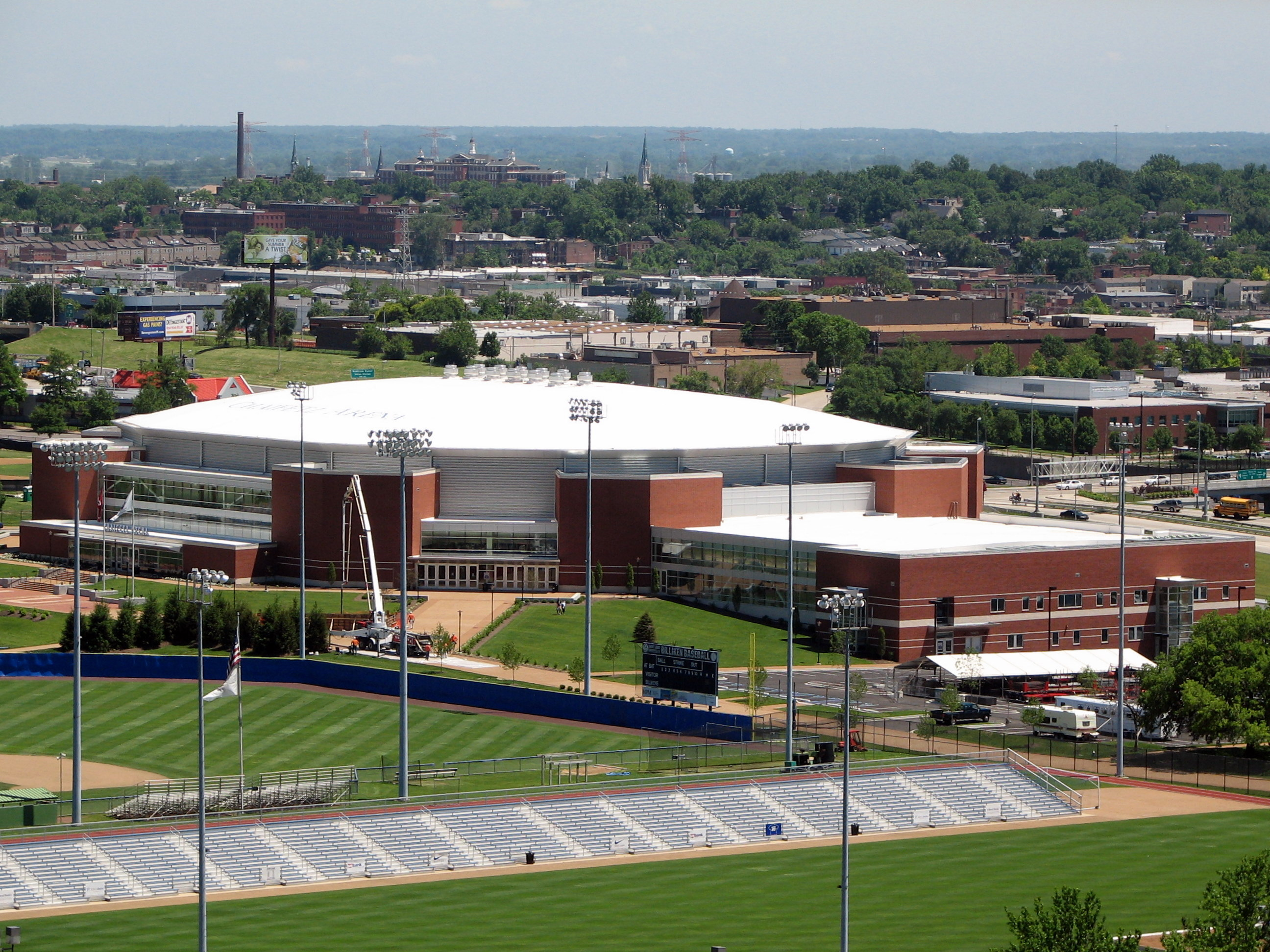
The event was held at the Chaifetz Arena in St. Louis, Missouri.

=== Background ===
On February 22, 2024, the American professional wrestling promotion All Elite Wrestling (AEW) filed to trademark the name "Dynasty". At Revolution on March 3, AEW announced that it would hold a pay-per-view (PPV) event titled Dynasty on April 21, 2024, at the Chaifetz Arena in St. Louis, Missouri, marking AEW's first PPV event to be held in the state. The 2021 Full Gear was originally scheduled for the same venue and would have been AEW's first PPV event in Missouri; however, it was relocated and rescheduled to avoid counter programming against other combat sporting events happening at the time. Tickets for Dynasty went on sale on March 8, 2024.

=== Storylines ===
AEW Dynasty featured professional wrestling matches that were the result of pre-existing feuds and storylines, with results being predetermined by AEW's writers. Storylines were produced on AEW's weekly television programs, Dynamite, Collision, and Rampage, and the YouTube series Being The Dark Order.

From mid-2022 through 2023, New Japan Pro-Wrestling (NJPW) mainstay Will Ospreay had appeared on AEW programming as a result of a working relationship between the two companies. Ospreay then appeared at Full Gear in November 2023 and signed a contract to join AEW, but did not officially join the roster until February 2024 after his NJPW obligations were fulfilled. Following Ospreay's match on the March 6 episode of Dynamite, he was confronted by Bryan Danielson. The two confronted each other again on the March 9 episode of Collision where Danielson issued a challenge at Dynasty to prove which of them was the best, and the match was later made official.

Following Sting's retirement match at Revolution, he and tag partner Darby Allin vacated the AEW World Tag Team Championship. During the post-event media scrum, AEW president Tony Khan announced that a tournament would be held to determine new champions. On the March 15 episode of Rampage, the tournament bracket was revealed and the tournament began on the following night's Collision. The Young Bucks (Matthew Jackson and Nicholas Jackson) and FTR (Dax Harwood and Cash Wheeler) won their respective brackets, setting up the tournament final for Dynasty, which was scheduled as a ladder match, also being a title rematch between the teams, as they last faced each other for the title at All In London in August 2023, which FTR won. During the April 10 episode of Dynamite, The Young Bucks showed the surveillance footage of the legitimate backstage altercation between Jack Perry and former AEW wrestler CM Punk, which they blamed as the reason for why they lost their match to FTR at All In. They also defended Perry and conspired that FTR were behind the incident due to being friends with Punk.

At Revolution, Swerve Strickland competed in a three-way match for the AEW World Championship where Samoa Joe retained the title. Strickland then accumulated wins throughout March to rise back up in the contendership rankings. Following his victory on the March 27 episode of Dynamite, it once again positioned him as the number one contender for the AEW World Championship, and the title match was scheduled for Dynasty.

In late 2023, Willow Nightingale's former tag team partner Skye Blue turned heel for the first time in her AEW career and aligned herself with TBS Champion Julia Hart. Throughout early 2024, Nightingale and her new tag team partner Kris Statlander feuded with Hart and Blue, with Nightingale and Statlander being victorious during the Revolution Zero Hour pre-show and then Hart and Blue victorious in a street fight on the March 20 episode of Rampage. On the March 27 episode of Dynamite, Nightingale defeated Statlander, Blue, and Anna Jay in a four-way match to challenge Hart for the TBS Championship at Dynasty.

Throughout the early months of 2024, Mark Briscoe engaged in a feud with House of Black (Malakai Black, Brody King, and Buddy Matthews), which included interfering in the House's AEW World Tag Team Championship tournament match. At the same time, he was also engaged in a friendly rivalry with Eddie Kingston over the latter's ROH World Championship. After House of Black attacked TNT Champion Adam Copeland during the March 30 episode of Collision, Briscoe and Kingston came out in support of Copeland, leading to the three men challenging House of Black to a trios match at Dynasty, which was later made official.

Thunder Rosa won her first AEW Women's World Championship at St. Patrick's Day Slam in March 2022 and was due to defend the title against Toni Storm at All Out in September of that year. However, due to Rosa being sidelined by a back injury, Storm instead won a four-way match at All Out to become interim champion, which was later retroactively recognized as her first reign after Rosa forfeited the title that November. Storm, who took on a "Timeless" gimmick in late 2023 impersonating a golden era film actress, won her third AEW Women's World Championship at that year's Full Gear. After Rosa returned to in-ring action in December 2023, Rosa laid claim to the championship she never lost, and quickly rose through the rankings to face Storm's protegé Mariah May on the April 4 episode of Dynamite in a number-one contendership match, which she won, and the title match was scheduled for Dynasty.

== Event ==
Other on-screen personnel
Role	Name
Commentators	Excalibur (Pre-show and PPV)
Commentators	Tony Schiavone (Pre-show and PPV)
Commentators	Taz (Pre-show and PPV)
Commentators	Nigel McGuinness (PPV)
Commentators	Jim Ross (Opener and Main event)
Commentators	Anthony Ogogo (Cassidy & Shibata vs. Shane Taylor Promotions match)
Commentators	Stokely Hathaway (TBS title match)
Commentators	Don Callis (Ospreay vs. Danielson)
Ring announcer	Justin Roberts
Referees	Aubrey Edwards
Referees	Bryce Remsburg
Referees	Mike Posey
Referees	Paul Turner
Referees	Rick Knox
Referees	Stephon Smith
Referees	Brandon Martinez
Pre-show hosts	Renee Paquette
Pre-show hosts	RJ City

=== Pre-show ===
In the first match of the Dynasty: Zero Hour pre-show, Trent Beretta faced Matt Sydal (accompanied by Mike Sydal). In the opening stages, Matt delivered a dropkick and a diving splash off the apron to Beretta. Beretta delivered a half-and-half suplex and a gotch-style piledriver to Matt for a two-count. Matt delivered an Air Raid Crash and a diving meteora to Beretta for a two-count. As Matt attempted a shooting star press on Beretta, the latter impeded it with a jumping knee strike and then locked in a Gogoplata, forcing Matt to tap out. Post-match, Mike attempted to attend to his brother Matt, but Beretta attacked both Mike and Matt, leading to Chuck Taylor coming out and chasing him out of the ring.

After that, Orange Cassidy and Katsuyori Shibata faced Shane Taylor Promotions (Shane Taylor and Lee Moriarty, accompanied by Anthony Ogogo). In the opening stages, Cassidy performed a middle-rope elbow drop and a suicide dive to Moriarty. Taylor tagged him and delivered a leg drop to Cassidy on the apron. Cassidy performed a Stundog Millionaire and a satellite DDT on Moriarty. Taylor then delivered a headbutt to Cassidy, but Shibata jumped on the former and locked in a sleeper hold. Cassidy then delivered the Orange Punch to Moriarty and pinned him for the win.

In the final pre-show match, AEW World Trios Champions The Acclaimed (Anthony Bowens, Max Caster, and Billy Gunn) faced ROH World Six-Man Tag Team Champions Bullet Club Gold (Jay White and The Gunns – Austin Gunn, and Colten Gunn) in a Winners Take All Championship Unification match, with the winners becoming the Unified AEW World Trios Champions. In the closing stages, Bowens and Caster hit Scissor Me Timbers on Austin. Colten hit Billy with a Fameasser, allowing White to hit Billy with a baseball bat, while Austin was distracting the referee. The Gunns then delivered the 3:10 To Yuma to Billy for a two-count. White delivered a uranage to Bowens. White attempted a dragon suplex to Billy, but Billy escaped and delivered the Fameasser. Billy attempted another Fameasser, but White moved out of the way and hit the Bladerunner for the win.

=== Preliminary matches ===
In the opening match of the event, Kazuchika Okada defended the AEW Continental Championship against Pac. In the opening stages, Pac delivered a hurricarana and then performed a twisting plancha to Okada. Pac then delivered an avalanche brainbuster for a two-count. Okada delivered a DDT to Pac on the floor and inside the ring for a two-count. Pac then delivered a springboard moonsault to Okada on the apron. Okada then performed an Air Raid Crash neckbreaker on Pac for a two-count. Okada delivered a diving elbow drop, but Pac inside cradled him for a nearfall. Pac then delivered a lariat and a deadlift German suplex to Okada for a two-count. Pac locked in the Brutalizer, but Okada raked Pac's eyes to break the submission. Okada attempted a tombstone piledriver, but Pac reversed it into a tombstone piledriver. Pac then attempted to deliver the Black Arrow, but Okada got his knees up. Okada then delivered the Rainmaker lariat to Pac and pinned him to retain the title.

Next, TNT Champion Adam Copeland, ROH World Champion Mark Briscoe, and Eddie Kingston faced House of Black (Malakai Black, Brody King, and Buddy Matthews). In the opening stages, King delivered a Bossman Slam and a cannonball to Kingston for a one-count. Black delivered a dropkick to Kingston for a two-count. Kingston then delivered a big boot and a German suplex to Black. King then delivered a running Death Valley Driver into the guardrail to Mark.as Copeland attempted an impaler DDT to King, but Matthews stopped him with a diving meteora. Kingston delivered a lariat and a spinning backfist to Black, a spear by Copeland and the Froggy Bow by Mark, but Matthews broke up the pin. Black delivered a jumping knee to Mark and Matthews delivered an enzeguiri to Kingston, but Copeland, Kingston and Mark responded with a triple spear to The House of Black. Copeland attempted a spear to Black, but Black impeded it with a mist to his face when the referee was distracted and then delivered the Black Mass to Copeland and pinned him to win the match.

Next, Julia Hart defended the TBS Champion against Willow Nightingale (accompanied by Stokely Hathaway) in a House Rules match, in which Nightingale's "House Rules" stipulation was that Kris Statlander and Skye Blue were barred from ringside. In the closing stages, Nightingale delivered a running boot and a spinebuster to Hart for a two-count. Nightingale attempted a shotgun dropkick but Hart escaped and locked in Hartless. Nightingale escaped and used an inside cradle for a two-count. Hart delivered two superkicks to Nightingale and attempted a moonsault, but Nightingale got her boots up. Nightingale then delivered a lariat and the doctor bomb and pinned her to win the TBS Championship. After the match, Mercedes Moné came out and stood face-to-face with Nightingale.

Next, Roderick Strong defended the International Champion against Kyle O'Reilly. In the opening stages, O'Reilly delivered a sliding knee strike and a roundhouse kick to Strong. O'Reilly attempted a high kick, but Strong countered it with a leg lariat. O'Reilly then performed an arm ringer and a twisting arm breaker. Strong delivered a backbreaker for a two-count. Kyle attempted a rising knee strike, but Strong caught him and delivered a uranage backbreaker and a gutbuster for a two-count. O'Reilly attempted another arm ringer, but Strong countered with an Olympic Slam. Strong delivered a pumphandle backbreaker to O'Reilly for a two-count. Strong attempted a Tiger Driver, but O'Reilly countered with a guillotine choke. Strong escaped and sent O'Reilly into the ropes. O'Reilly used an inside cradle and a crucifix driver for two-counts respectively. O'Reilly attempted a Regal Plex, but Strong escaped and delivered a jumping knee strike and the End of Heartache to retain the title. After the match, fellow Undisputed Kingdom members, Mike Bennett and Matt Taven raised Strong on their shoulders, as Adam Cole and Wardlow applauded him.

In the fifth match, Hook defended the FTW Championship against Chris Jericho in an FTW Rules match. In the opening stages, Hook delivered a Northern Lights suplex and a T-Bone suplex to Jericho. Hook delivered a German suplex to Jericho on the floor. Jericho delivered a DDT to Hook onto a trash can. Jericho attempted a superplex, but Hook countered it into an avalanche T-bone suplex through a table for a two-count. Hook put the trash can on Jericho's head, smacked it multiple times with a kendo stick and then delivered another T-bone suplex to him for a two-count. Hook delivered another northern lights suplex, but Jericho responded with a codebreaker. Hook attempted RedRum, but Jericho escaped it with a low blow and then a Judas Effect for a two-count. Jericho hit another Judas Effect on Hook for a two-count. After Hook gave the middle finger to Jericho, he responded to hit him in the head with a baseball bat and then pinned him to win the FTW Championship.

Next, "Timeless" Toni Storm (accompanied by Mariah May and Luther the Butler) defended the AEW Women's World Championship against Thunder Rosa. In the opening stages, Thunder Rosa performed a tieres and tornillo over the ropes to Storm. Thunder Rosa attempted a diving crossbody, but Storm caught her and delivered a backbreaker. Thunder Rosa delivered a powerbomb and a crucifix driver for two-counts respectively. Storm delivered a low dropkick to Thunder Rosa, but the latter responded with a Death Valley Driver for a two-count. Storm performed a backstabber and a tornado DDT on Thunder Rosa, and then a fisherman suplex for a two-count. Thunder Rosa then delivered a German suplex to Storm, but Mariah May got up on the apron to distract Thunder Rosa. Deonna Purrazzo came out and pulled Mariah down, attacked her and sent Luther into the steel steps. As Thunder Rosa was still distracted, Storm German suplexed her, delivered a running hip attack in the corner and then the Storm Zero for a two-count. As the referee was distracted, Storm delivered a low blow to Thunder Rosa and delivered the Storm Zero to retain her title.

After that, Will Ospreay faced Bryan Danielson. In the opening stages, Ospreay performed a plancha and a dropkick. Danielson attempted a flying clothesline, but Ospreay ducked and performed a handspring corkscrew kick. Ospreay then performed a twisting moonsault to the outside and attempted the Hidden Blade back in the ring, but Danielson kicked him and delivered a Tiger suplex for a two-count. Danielson attempted an hurricarana off the top rope, but Ospreay landed on his feet and delivered a hook kick and a Tiger Driver for a two-count. Danielson delivered an avalanche Tiger suplex and the kicks to Ospreay. Danielson delivered a PK, but Ospreay sat up and delivered an elbow strike. Danielson locked in a Cattle Multilation, but Ospreay reached the bottom rope. Ospreay attempted a Tiger Driver, but Danielson escaped it. Ospreay delivered a superkick and an OsCutter. Ospreay then delivered a Hidden Blade off the apron to Danielson. Ospreay performed a Coast-to-Coast and a Liger Bomb to Danielson for a two-count. Danielson locked in La Mistica into the LeBell Lock, but Ospreay reached the ropes. Danielson then delivered the Yes. Kicks and attempted the Busaiku Knee, but Ospreay attempted to intercept it into a powerbomb, but Danielson countered into a hurricarana driver for a two-count. Ospreay attempted the Hidden Blade, but Danielson ducked and delivered the Busaiku Knee for a nearfall. Ospreay delivered the Styles Clash and performed Kawada kicks. Danielson performed the Regal Plex on Ospreay, but Ospreay rolled up and delivered the Hidden Blade. Ospreay attempted the OsCutter, but Danielson caught him mid-air with the Busaiku Knee for another. Ospreay delivered another Hidden Blade and then the Tiger Driver 91. Ospreay then delivered the Hidden Blade to Danielson and pinned him to win the match. After the match, Ospreay and the doctors went to check on Danielson.

The penultimate match was a tournament final for the vacant AEW World Tag Team Championship in which The Young Bucks faced FTR in a ladder match. In the opening stages, The Bucks attempted the EVP Trigger to Harwood, but Harwood ducked and Wheeler delivered a diving double clothesline. The Bucks delivered double superkicks to FTR and attempted to set up the ladder. Nicholas delivered a PK to Harwood off the apron and then delivered a senton to Wheeler onto a ladder. The Bucks put Harwood in between a ladder and hit him repeatedly with a chair, before throwing it into Wheeler's face. Wheeler threw a ladder into The Bucks's face and then delivered a moonsault to both Nicholas and Matthew. Wheeler got crotched in between the ladder, allowing the Bucks to deliver the EVP Trigger. The Bucks attempted to superplex Harwood through the table on the outside, but Wheeler made the save. FTR performed a doomsday bulldog to Matthew. Nicholas delivered a slingshot powerbomb to Wheeler off the ladder. Harwood then speared Matthew through the table on the guardrail. Harwood attempted to powerbomb Nicholas off the apron through another table on the outside, but Nicholas reversed it into a hurricarana through that table. FTR then delivered the Shatter Machine to Matthew off the ladder. Nicholas performed a 450° splash off the top rope through a table to Wheeler. Harwood then delivered a piledriver to Matthew through a bridged ladder. Nicholas attempted to retrieve the titles, but Harwood jumped from the top rope and delivered a sunset flip powerbomb to Nicholas. Harwood and Nicholas climbed the ladder and both attempted to retrieve the title. Harwood pushed Nicholas down and attempted to retrieve the title, until a masked man jumped from the guardrail and pushed Harwood off the ladder. The security guards came down and removed the mask. It was revealed to be "The Scapegoat* Jack Perry, marking Perry's first AEW appearance since August 2023 at the All In event. Nicholas then climbed the ladder and retrieved the title belts, making the Bucks the first three-time AEW World Tag Team Champions.

=== Main event ===
In the main event, Samoa Joe defended the AEW World Championship against Swerve Strickland (accompanied by Prince Nana). In the opening stages, Strickland attempted a suicide dive, but Joe caught him and delivered a uranage onto the announce table. Strickland performed a Fosbury Flop, but Joe responded with a powerslam onto the concrete. Joe performed a rolling cannonball and a jumping elbow drop for a two-count. Strickland delivered a German suplex to Joe for a two-count. Strickland delivered a rolling flatliner for a two-count. Joe then delivered a buckle bomb to Strickland and then the Muscle Buster for a two-count. Strickland them delivered the House Call, a 450° splash and the Swerve Stomp to Joe for a nearfall. Strickland attempted to hit Joe with the title belt, but Joe low blowed him and locked in the Coquina Clutch. Strickland escaped by snapping Joe's arm and then hit the House Call for a two-count. Strickland delivered a sunset flip powerbomb and then the Swerve Stomp for the three-count, ending Joe's reign at 113 days, and making Strickland the first African-American world champion in AEW.

== Reception ==
Mike Malkasian of Wrestling Headlines gave the overall show a 9.5/10, saying "On a PPV that contained one of the greatest pro wrestling matches I’ve ever seen, it was about four hours long. Obviously, watch Danielson and Ospreay, but go out of you way to watch Pac/Okada, Toni Storm/Thunder Rosa, O’Reilly/Strong, and FTR/Young Bucks, too. A night filled with unbelievable wrestling, excellent storytelling, and compelling twists and turns. When you sit back and look at the big picture, there is a heck of a bright future ahead for AEW".

Erik Beaston of Bleacher Report graded the show an A, saying "On paper, Dynasty was one of the best cards in AEW history. In execution, Dynasty had one of the best cards in AEW history. Whether AEW can build on the momentum remains to be seen. The company has had many great PPV offerings before, only to fall back into the same booking traps.

Phil Wheat of Nerdly gave the overall show a 4.5/5, saying "Just when you think AEW can’t do it better, they do. What can you really say about a PPV this good? Yes there are some low points – in particular the Jericho/Hook match (as you’ll hear from the fans in attendance) – but overall this was an amazing pay-per-view. Definitely an instant classic pay-per-view, Dynasty raised AEW out of the doldrums it has been in for a lot of 2024".

John Canton of TJR Wrestling.net gave the overall show an 8.25/10, saying "it was a very good show as usual for most AEW PPVs. Other than that, it was mostly just bell-to-bell action with a few title changes. I think most of the match results were predictable and I did pretty well in terms of picking the winners. A predictable show isn’t bad by any means. Just saying that there weren’t many surprises in terms of results or moments. Good job AEW and the St. Louis crowd was awesome too. I enjoyed the show".

Michael Dworkis of The Pop Break simply said "Dynasty earns its own title for best PPV of the year thus far. Almost every match delivered something memorable. There was so much to become invested in, I can’t imagine any fan of wrestling dismissing what was one of the best lineups in recent history".

Wrestling journalist Dave Meltzer of the Wrestling Observer Newsletter rated the Ospreay vs. Danielson match six and a half stars—the second highest rating ever given after Kenny Omega and Kazuchika Okada's seven-star match at NJPW's Dominion 6.9 in Osaka-jo Hall in 2018—and described the match as "the second-best match [he's] ever seen". Meltzer also rated the Trent vs. Sydal match, the Cassidy and Shibata–STP bout and the FTW Championship match 3.25 stars, the Unification Trios Championship match 2.75 stars, the AEW Continental Championship 4.75 stars, HOB–Copeland, Mark and Kingston bout and the AEW Women's World Championship match 4.25 stars, the TBS Championship match 2 stars (the lowest rated match on the card), the AEW World Tag Team Championship ladder match 4.5 stars, and the main event 4.25 stars.

== Results ==
No.	Results	Stipulations	Times
1^{P}	Trent Beretta defeated Matt Sydal (with Mike Sydal) by submission	Singles match	8:00
2^{P}	Katsuyori Shibata and Orange Cassidy defeated Shane Taylor Promotions (Shane Taylor and Lee Moriarty) (with Anthony Ogogo) by pinfall	Tag team match	12:40
3^{P}	Bullet Club Gold (Jay White, Austin Gunn, and Colten Gunn) (ROH) defeated The Acclaimed (Anthony Bowens, Max Caster, and Billy Gunn) (AEW) by pinfall	Winners Take All Title Unification match to "unify" the AEW World Trios Championship and ROH World Six-Man Tag Team Championship into the Unified World Trios Championship	14:45
4	Kazuchika Okada (c) defeated Pac by pinfall	Singles match for the AEW Continental Championship	21:55
5	House of Black (Malakai Black, Brody King, and Buddy Matthews) defeated Adam Copeland, Eddie Kingston, and Mark Briscoe by pinfall	Trios match	17:45
6	Willow Nightingale (with Stokely Hathaway) defeated Julia Hart (c) by pinfall	"House Rules" match for the AEW TBS Championship; Willow's stipulation was that Skye Blue and Kris Statlander were barred from ringside.	6:00
7	Roderick Strong (c) defeated Kyle O'Reilly by pinfall	Singles match for the AEW International Championship	17:20
8	Chris Jericho defeated Hook (c) by pinfall	FTW Rules match for the FTW Championship	16:35
9	"Timeless" Toni Storm (c) (with Mariah May and Luther) defeated Thunder Rosa by pinfall	Singles match for the AEW Women's World Championship	15:10
10	Will Ospreay defeated Bryan Danielson by pinfall	Singles match	32:40
11	The Young Bucks (Matthew Jackson and Nicholas Jackson) defeated FTR (Dax Harwood and Cash Wheeler)	Tournament final Ladder match for the vacant AEW World Tag Team Championship	21:35
12	Swerve Strickland (with Prince Nana) defeated Samoa Joe (c) by pinfall	Singles match for the AEW World Championship	18:00
(c) / – the champion(s) heading into the match; P / – the match was broadcast on the pre-show

=== AEW World Tag Team Championship Tournament ===
At the end of the 2024 Revolution event, AEW World Tag Team Champions Sting and Darby Allin vacated the tag titles due to Sting's retirement. During the post-show press conference, Tony Khan announced that a tournament would take place to determine new champions with two wild card matches taking place to determine which teams would enter the first round. The Infantry (Capt. Shawn Dean and Carlie Bravo) defeated House of Black (Buddy Matthews and Brody King) to win the first wildcard match, while Best Friends (Trent Beretta and Orange Cassidy) defeated The Don Callis Family (Kyle Fletcher and Powerhouse Hobbs) to win the second and final wildcard match.

Wildcard Round; Collision (March 16); Rampage (March 20)
Best Friends (Trent Beretta and Orange Cassidy)	Pin
The Don Callis Family (Kyle Fletcher and Powerhouse Hobbs)	10:30
The Infantry (Carlie Bravo and Capt. Shawn Dean)	Pin
House of Black (Brody King and Buddy Matthews)	7:45

Quarterfinals; Dynamite (March 27); Collision (March 30)
The Young Bucks (Matthew Jackson and Nicholas Jackson)	Pin
Private Party ("Brother Zay" Isiah Kassidy and Marq Quen)	13:30
The Undisputed Kingdom (Mike Bennett and Matt Taven)	9:35
Best Friends (Trent Beretta and Orange Cassidy)	Pin
The Infantry (Carlie Bravo and Capt. Shawn Dean)	12:20
FTR (Dax Harwood and Cash Wheeler)	Pin
Top Flight (Dante Martin and Darius Martin)	Pin
Ricky Starks and Big Bill	9:40

Semifinals; Dynamite (April 3); Collision (April 6)
The Young Bucks (Matthew Jackson and Nicholas Jackson)	Pin
Best Friends (Trent Beretta and Orange Cassidy)	12:30
FTR (Dax Harwood and Cash Wheeler)	Pin
Top Flight (Dante Martin and Darius Martin)	15:40

Final; Dynasty (April 21)
The Young Bucks (Matthew Jackson and Nicholas Jackson)	Retrieved titles
FTR (Dax Harwood and Cash Wheeler)	21:35
