= AEW Big Business =

2024 All Elite Wrestling television special

Big Business
- Promotional poster featuring various AEW wrestlers
- Promotion: All Elite Wrestling
- Date: March 13, 2024
- City: Boston, Massachusetts
- Venue: TD Garden
- Attendance: 9,514

AEW Dynamite special episodes chronology
← Previous; Homecoming	Next → Beach Break

Big Business (stylized as Big Bu$iness) was a 2024 professional wrestling television special produced by All Elite Wrestling (AEW). It took place on March 13, 2024, at TD Garden in Boston, Massachusetts and aired live as a special episode of Wednesday Night Dynamite on TBS in the United States. The event notably featured the anticipated debut of Mercedes Moné in AEW, who had been speculated to debut at the event.

Five matches were contested during the live broadcast, with four additional matches taped for the March 15 episode of Friday Night Rampage on TNT. In the main event of Big Business, Willow Nightingale defeated Riho. In other prominent matches, Jay White defeated Darby Allin, and in the opening bout, Samoa Joe defeated Wardlow to retain the AEW World Championship.

== Production ==
=== Background ===
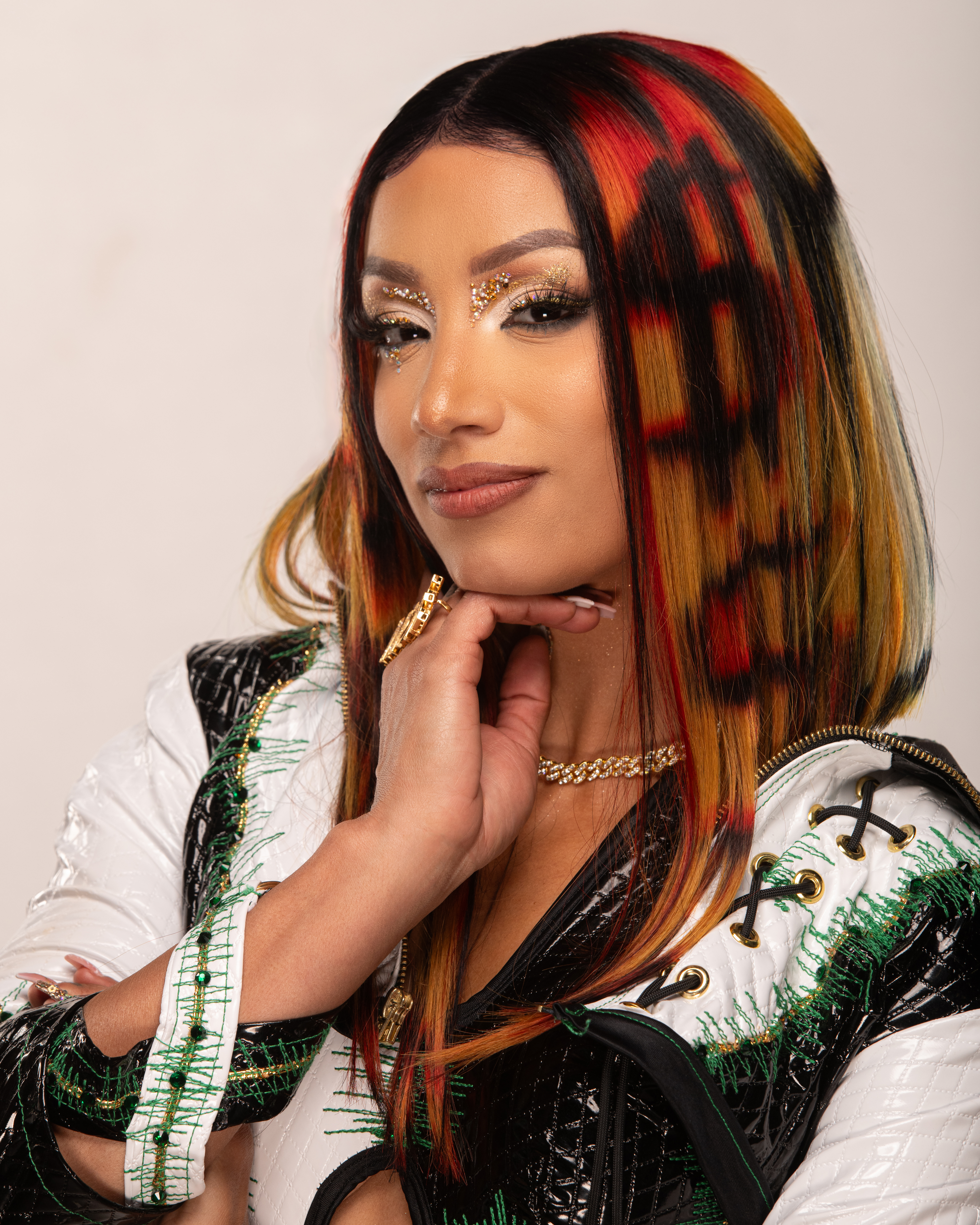
Following speculation, Mercedes Moné made her anticipated All Elite Wrestling debut at Dynamite: Big Business.

AEW Dynamite is the flagship weekly television program of the American professional wrestling company All Elite Wrestling (AEW). During the February 7, 2024, episode of the show, AEW president Tony Khan announced a special edition of the program titled "Big Business". The television special was scheduled for March 13 at the TD Garden in Boston, Massachusetts and aired live on TBS in the United States. Khan claimed that Big Business would be "one of the most important nights" for AEW.

Due to the event taking place in Boston and with the promotional poster stylizing the event as "Big Bu$iness" and "Bo$$ton", speculation began that the event would see the AEW debut of Mercedes Moné, who is billed from Boston and had used a "Bo$$" gimmick when she performed in WWE as Sasha Banks from 2012 to 2022. Following her departure from WWE, she changed her ring name to Mercedes Moné and performed in New Japan Pro-Wrestling (NJPW) and its sister promotion World Wonder Ring Stardom in 2023. Both Fightful and wrestling journalist Andrew Zarian of Mat Men Radio also reported that she had been under contract with AEW since early January 2024 and would debut at the event. Moné had previously made a cameo appearance at AEW's All In pay-per-view (PPV) event in August 2023 as a spectator.

=== Storylines ===
Big Business featured five professional wrestling matches that involved different wrestlers from pre-existing scripted feuds and storylines, written by AEW's writers. Storylines were produced on AEW's weekly television programs, Dynamite, Rampage, and Collision.

At Revolution, Wardlow won the eight-man All-Star Scramble match to earn a future match against Samoa Joe for the AEW World Championship. During the March 6 episode of Dynamite, the title match was scheduled for Big Business.

During Revolution's post-event media scrum, Tony Khan announced that Darby Allin would face Jay White at Big Business.

NJPW mainstay Kazuchika Okada had previously been speculated to make his official debut as an AEW roster member at Big Business and had previously made appearances in AEW through the company's partnership with NJPW. However, Okada instead made his official debut as a member of the AEW roster a week early on the March 6 episode of Dynamite and turned heel by attacking Eddie Kingston, subsequently joining with The Young Bucks (Matthew Jackson and Nicholas Jackson). Nicholas then introduced Okada as the newest member of The Elite after announcing that "Hangman" Adam Page and Kenny Omega were fired from the group. Following the new Elite's (The Young Bucks and Okada) debut match during the March 9 episode of Collision, Pac, who had been out since July 2023, made his return to AEW and saved Kingston and Penta El Zero Miedo from a beatdown by The Elite. It was then announced that The Elite would face Kingston and Death Triangle (Pac and Penta) in a trios match at Big Business.

== Event ==
The highlight of Big Business was the anticipated AEW debut of Mercedes Moné, which kicked off the show with her new entrance music by Moné herself. She thanked the fans for supporting her over the prior two years. She also referenced her PPV main event match at WWE's 2016 Hell in a Cell event, which was also held at the TD Garden. She said that match helped her to lead the women's revolution in professional wrestling as it was the first women's PPV main event held at the arena. Moné also said she came to AEW because it was where she needed to be, and while she was excited to face all of the women on the roster, there were some she had unfinished business with, in particular, Willow Nightingale, who had defeated Moné to become the inaugural NJPW Strong Women's Champion.

== Results ==
No.	Results	Stipulations	Times
1	Samoa Joe (c) defeated Wardlow by technical submission	Singles match for the AEW World Championship	11:00
2	The Elite (The Young Bucks (Matthew Jackson and Nicholas Jackson) and Kazuchika Okada) defeated Eddie Kingston and Death Triangle (Pac and Penta El Zero Miedo) (with Alex Abrahantes) by pinfall	Trios match	12:40
3	Jay White defeated Darby Allin by pinfall	Singles match	12:15
4	Lion-Hook ("Lionheart" Chris Jericho and Hook) defeated Gates of Agony (Bishop Kaun and Toa Liona) by submission	Tag team match	13:00
5	Willow Nightingale defeated Riho by pinfall	Singles match	8:45
(c) / – the champion(s) heading into the match
