= AEW Revolution (2024) =

All Elite Wrestling pay-per-view event

Revolution
- Promotional poster featuring Sting
- Promotion: All Elite Wrestling
- Date: March 3, 2024
- City: Greensboro, North Carolina
- Venue: Greensboro Coliseum
- Attendance: 16,878
- Buy rate: 180,000
- Tagline: Sting's Last Match

Pay-per-view chronology
| ← Previous; Worlds End | Next → Dynasty |

Revolution chronology
| ← Previous; 2023 | Next → 2025 |

The 2024 Revolution was a professional wrestling pay-per-view (PPV) event produced by All Elite Wrestling (AEW). It was the fifth annual Revolution and took place on March 3, 2024, at the Greensboro Coliseum in Greensboro, North Carolina, marking AEW's first PPV to be held in North Carolina. The event hosted the final match in Sting's nearly 40-year career, and was held at the same venue in which he had faced Ric Flair for the NWA World Heavyweight Championship at Clash of the Champions I in March 1988, which is considered to be the match that established Sting as a top wrestler in the industry.

Eleven matches were contested at the event, including two on the "Zero Hour" pre-show. The main event was Sting's retirement match in which he and Darby Allin defeated The Young Bucks (Matthew Jackson and Nicholas Jackson) in a tornado tag team match to retain the AEW World Tag Team Championship, and as a result, Sting retired undefeated in AEW. In another prominent match, Samoa Joe defeated "Hangman" Adam Page and Swerve Strickland in a three-way match to retain the AEW World Championship. The event also saw the return of Kyle O'Reilly, who had been out with an injury since June 2022, as well as Will Ospreay's first match as a member of the AEW roster, defeating Konosuke Takeshita on the undercard.

== Production ==
=== Background ===
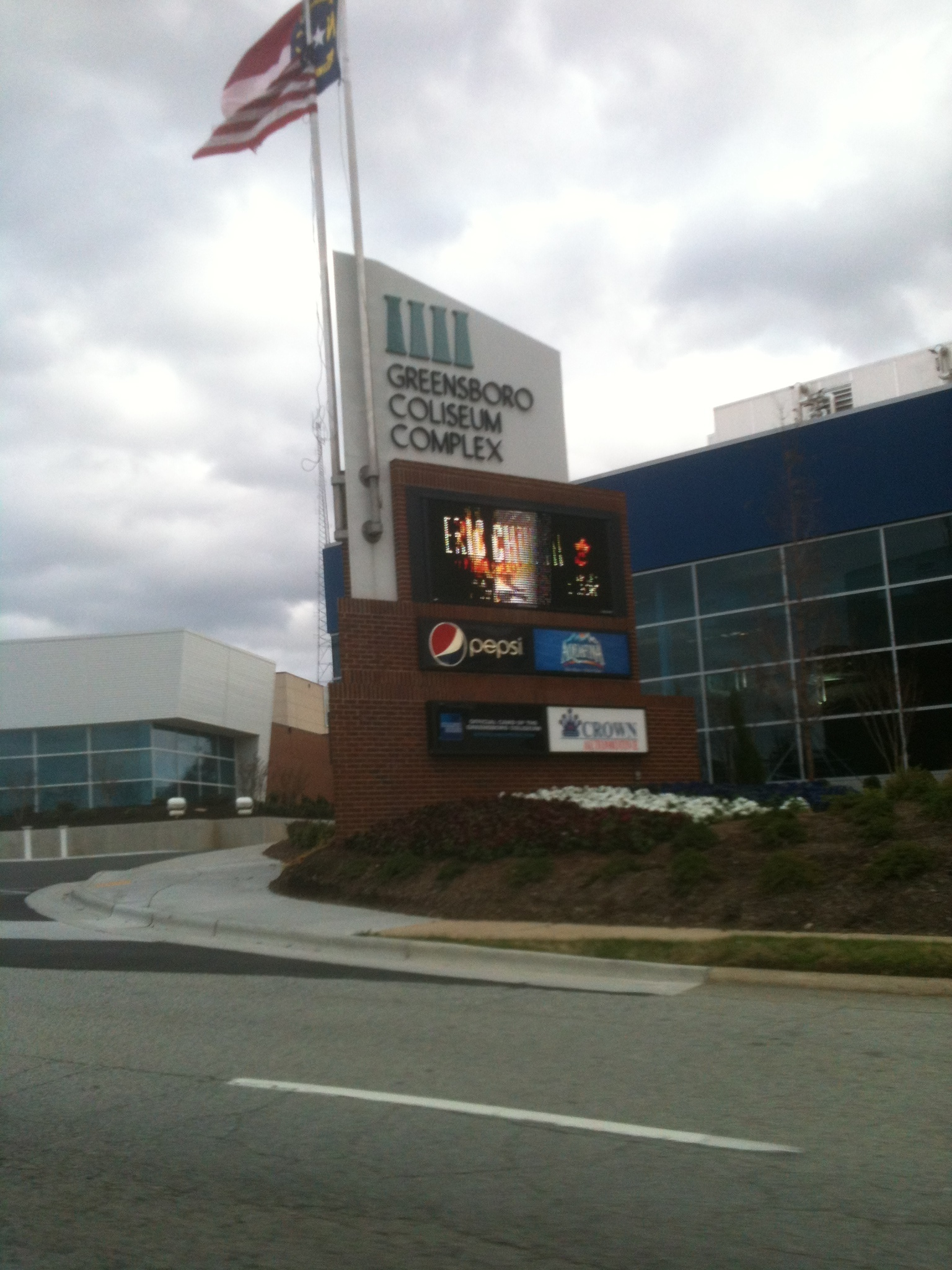
The event was held at the Greensboro Coliseum in Greensboro, North Carolina, marking All Elite Wrestling's first pay-per-view event to be held in North Carolina.

Revolution is a professional wrestling pay-per-view (PPV) event held annually by All Elite Wrestling (AEW) since 2020—it was originally held in late February but moved to early March in 2021. It is one of AEW's "Big Four" PPVs, which also includes Double or Nothing, All Out, and Full Gear, their four biggest domestic shows produced quarterly.

The 2024 Revolution was confirmed by AEW wrestler and wrestling veteran Sting on the October 18, 2023, episode of Dynamite. Sting recapped how he had his AEW debut match at the 2021 Revolution, which was a cinematic tag team street fight with tag partner Darby Allin, and then announced that he would have the final match in his nearly 40-year career at the 2024 Revolution. During the November 29 episode, the fifth Revolution event was confirmed to be held on March 3, 2024, at the Greensboro Coliseum in Greensboro, North Carolina, the same venue in which Sting famously faced Ric Flair at Clash of the Champions I in March 1988, which was produced by the National Wrestling Alliance's Jim Crockett Promotions. Flair also confirmed he would be in Sting's corner for the match. This was also AEW's first PPV to be held in North Carolina.

Tickets for the event went on sale on December 15, 2023. According to WrestleTix on X, over 13,000 tickets were sold within the first week. Wrestling journalist John Pollock added that AEW had to revise production plans in order to meet fan demand and the company opened up as many seats as possible.

=== Storylines ===
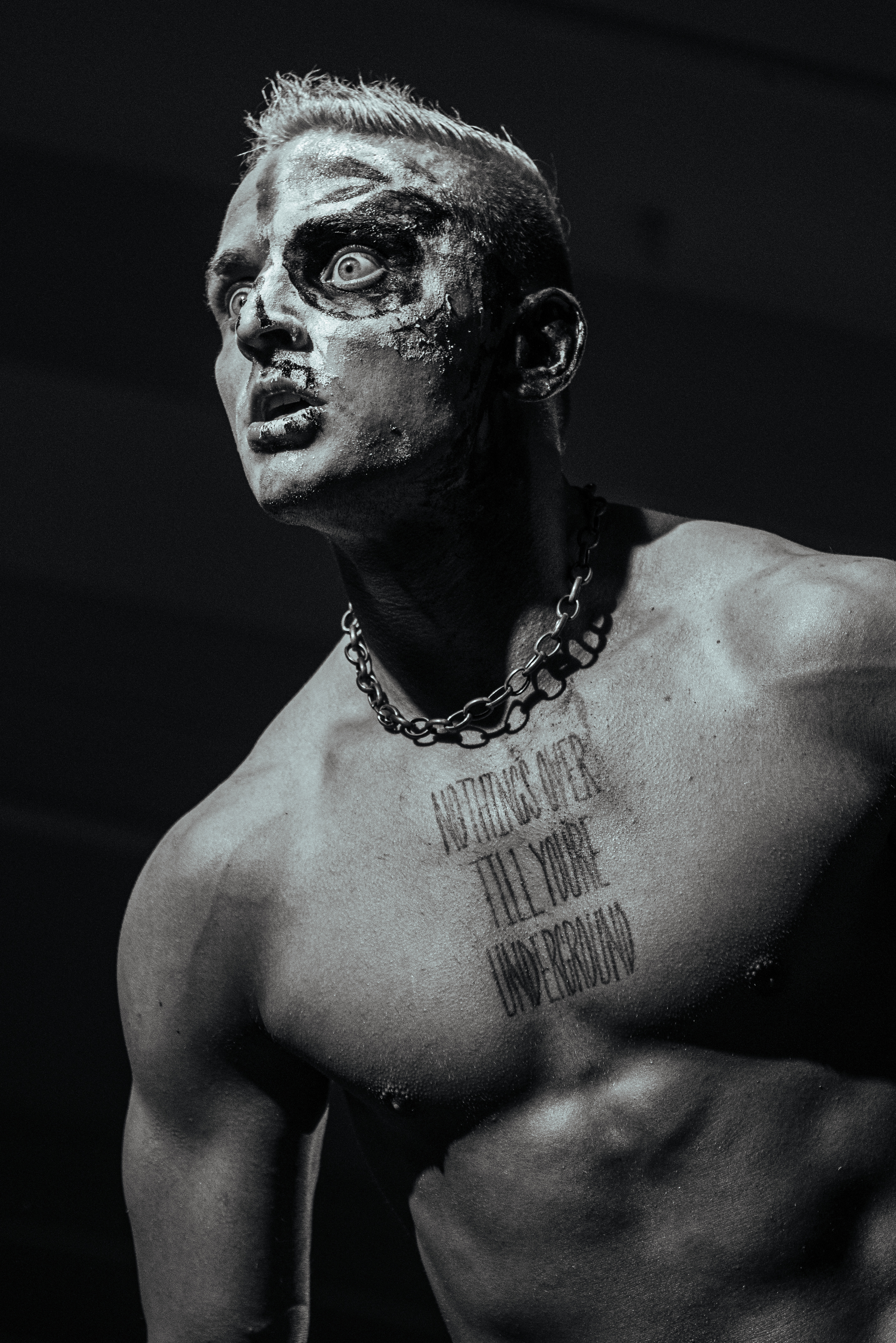
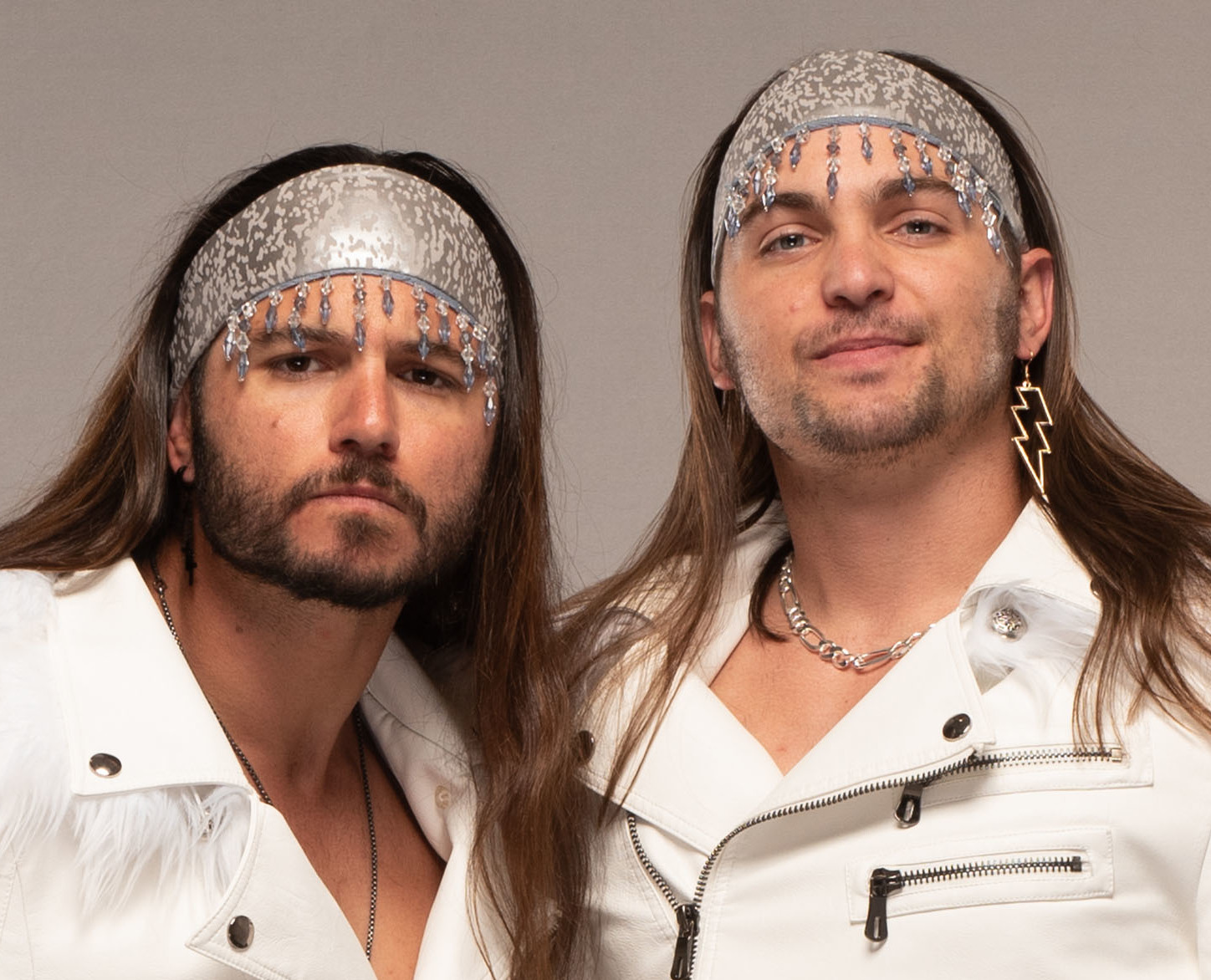
Left: Following Sting's debut in All Elite Wrestling (AEW) in December 2020, he acted as a mentor to Darby Allin with the two becoming a tag team. For Sting's entire AEW run, the two went undefeated as a tag team and won the AEW World Tag Team Championship, which they successfully defended in Sting's final match at Revolution 2024.

Right: The Young Bucks (Matthew Jackson and Nicholas Jackson) faced Sting and Darby Allin for Sting's final match at Revolution 2024. Outside of kayfabe, Sting chose The Young Bucks to be his final opponents.

Revolution featured professional wrestling matches that were the result of pre-existing feuds and storylines, with results predetermined by AEW's writers. Storylines were produced on AEW's weekly television programs, Dynamite, Collision, and Rampage, and the YouTube series, Being The Dark Order.

After Sting and Darby Allin's victory at Dynamite: Homecoming on January 10 and with Revolution quickly approaching, Tony Schiavone asked Sting who his final opponent would be. Before Sting could answer, The Young Bucks (Matt Jackson and Nick Jackson) interrupted in their first appearance since Full Gear in November 2023. The two teams subsequently stared each other down, with the commentators implying that The Young Bucks wanted to challenge Sting and Allin for Sting's final match. The following week, The Young Bucks, now preferring to be called Matthew and Nicholas Jackson, said they would be taking their roles as AEW executive vice presidents (EVP) more seriously, and said that while they respected Sting, it was time to say goodbye. Later, Allin recapped that he and Sting were undefeated as a tag team and declared that they would end their story together as AEW World Tag Team Champions. They subsequently won the title on the February 7 episode, but after the match, they were brutally attacked by The Young Bucks, who also attacked Sting's sons Garrett Borden and Steven Borden Jr. After The Young Bucks's tag team victory the following week, they subsequently became the number one ranked tag team. As they were about to attack Schiavone post-match, Allin made the save; Sting was absent due to the previous week's attack. Allin criticized Matthew and Nicholas, stating they no longer cared about the original goal of AEW and only cared about themselves. Allin then accepted that he and Sting would defend the AEW World Tag Team Championship against The Young Bucks, which was scheduled as a tornado tag team match at Revolution.

At Worlds End on December 30, 2023, Adam Cole was revealed to be the man in the devil mask that had been targeting MJF over the prior few months. The devil's masked men were also revealed to be Roderick Strong, Matt Taven, Mike Bennett, and Wardlow. On the following episode of Dynamite, the group dubbed themselves the Undisputed Kingdom and laid out their goals, which included Strong capturing the AEW International Championship. Two weeks later, Strong, Bennett, and Taven confronted International Champion Orange Cassidy after his match. Cassidy offered to immediately defend the title against Strong, who denied and proposed that the match take place at Revolution, which was later made official.

In September 2023, Swerve Strickland and "Hangman" Adam Page entered into a feud which saw Strickland gain victories over Page in a singles match at WrestleDream in October and in a Texas Death match at Full Gear in November. After Samoa Joe won the AEW World Championship at Worlds End on December 30, he appeared at Dynamite: Homecoming on January 10, 2024; Strickland and Page were among those who confronted Joe and laid claim to the title. After Strickland and Page went undefeated through January and were placed first and second in the title contendership rankings, a match between the two was scheduled for the February 7 episode of Dynamite to determine who would challenge Joe at Revolution. Their match went to a 30-minute time limit draw; as a result, both men were declared number one contenders with Joe in turn scheduled to defend the AEW World Championship against both in a three-way match.

On the January 3 episode of Dynamite, former Total Nonstop Action Wrestling wrestler Deonna Purrazzo confronted "Timeless" Toni Storm's associate Mariah May, and officially announced that she was signed to AEW. Purrazzo then made her intentions clear that she was going after Storm's AEW Women's World Championship, talking about how they were friends when they started in wrestling together and even got matching ankle tattoos. Purrazzo then quickly moved up the rankings to become the number one contender to face Storm for the championship at Revolution.

At Worlds End, Eddie Kingston became the inaugural AEW Continental Champion, which also made him the Continental Crown Champion by holding the new title with his ROH World and NJPW Strong Openweight Championships. During the tournament itself, he defeated Bryan Danielson to secure his spot in the final. On the January 20 episode of Collision, Kingston teamed with Ortiz in a losing effort against Danielson and Claudio Castagnoli; after the match, Danielson spit in Kingston's face. Over the weeks, Danielson continued to show Kingston disrespect by flipping him off backstage or immediately coming out for his own matches whenever Kingston was celebrating his own victories, one of which was against Bryan Keith and led to Keith receiving an AEW contract. On the February 10 episode of Collision, Kingston challenged Danielson to a match at Revolution for the Continental Crown Championship, with an added stipulation that if Kingston won, Danielson would have to shake Kingston's hand out of respect.

== Event ==
Other on-screen personnel
| Role | Name |
|---|---|
| Commentators | Excalibur (Pre-show and PPV) |
| Commentators | Nigel McGuinness (Pre-show and PPV) |
| Commentators | Taz (PPV) |
| Commentators | Tony Schiavone (PPV) |
| Commentators | Stokely Hathaway (Statlander and Nightingale vs. Hart and Blue) |
| Commentators | Don Callis (Ospreay vs. Takeshita match) |
| Commentators | Jim Ross (last 2 matches) |
| Ring announcers | Justin Roberts |
| Ring announcers | Dasha Gonzalez |
| Referees | Aubrey Edwards |
| Referees | Bryce Remsburg |
| Referees | Paul Turner |
| Referees | Rick Knox |
| Referees | Stephon Smith |
| Referees | Brandon Martinez |
| Interviewer | Lexy Nair |
| Pre-show hosts | Renee Paquette |
| Pre-show hosts | RJ City |

=== Pre-show ===
There were two matches that took place on the Revolution: Zero Hour pre-show. In the first, The Bang Bang Scissor Gang (Max Caster, Anthony Bowens, Billy Gunn, Austin Gunn, Colten Gunn, and Jay White) faced Jeff Jarrett, Jay Lethal, Satnam Singh, Willie Mack, and Private Party ("Brother Zay" Isiah Kassidy and Marq Quen). In the opening stages, The Acclaimed and Billy Gunn performed Scissor Me Timbers on Quen, but Lethal distracted the referee, allowing Quen to deliver a dropkick. In the end, as Singh attempted to chokeslam Gunn, White performed a chop block on him, allowing Gunn to deliver the Fameasser on Singh. White then delivered the Bladerunner to Mack and pinned him to win the match.

In the second and final match in the pre-show, Kris Statlander and Willow Nightingale (accompanied by Stokely Hathaway) faced Julia Hart and Skye Blue. In the opening stages, Willow performed a running crossbody on Hart for a two count. Statlander then delivered a back suplex to Hart. Hart performed a moonsault on Statlander, but Nightingale broke up the pin attempt. Statlander delivered a double lariat to Blue and Hart, while Nightingale performed a pounce on Blue. Statlander dropkicked Hart out of the ring and Nightingale performed a Doctor Bomb and pinned Blue to win the match.

=== Preliminary matches ===
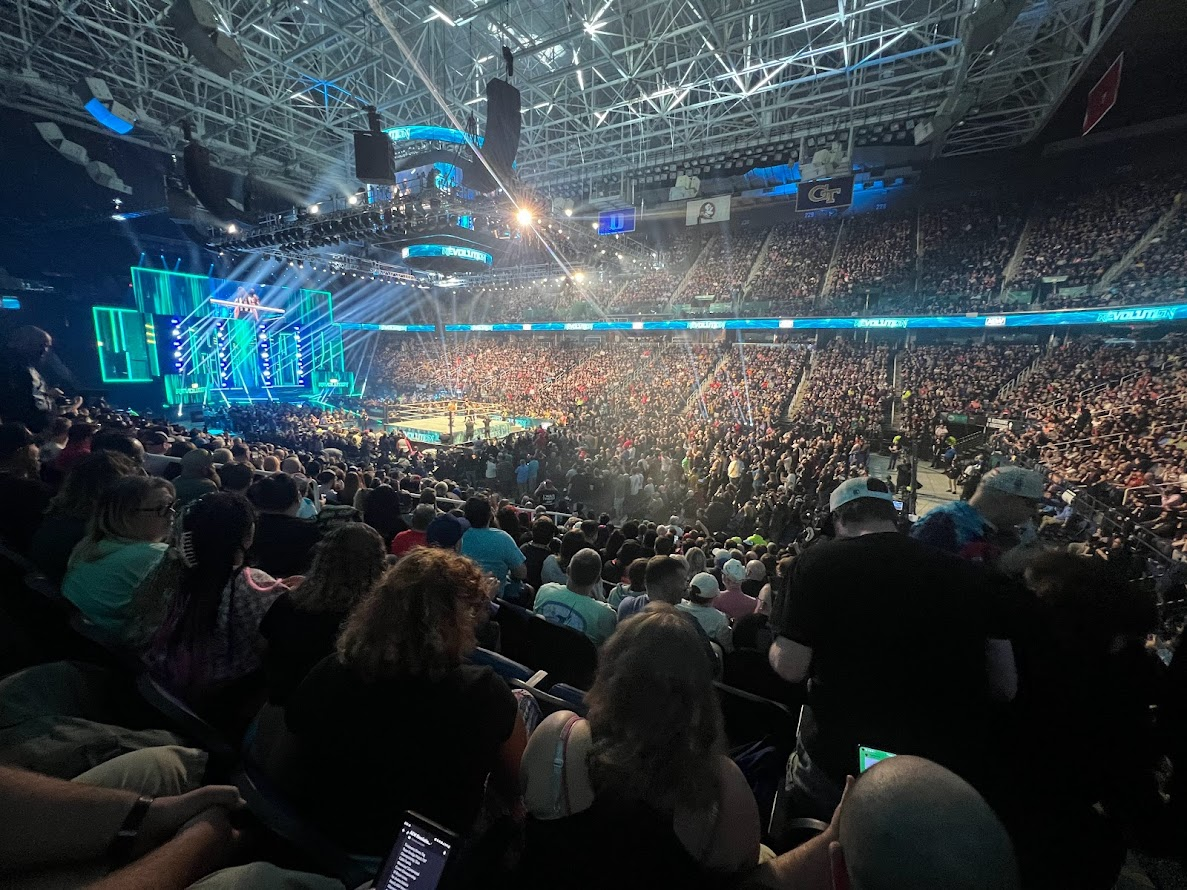
Inside view of the sold out Greensboro Coliseum for Revolution 2024

In the opening match of the pay-per-view, Christian Cage (accompanied by Killswitch, Mother Wayne, and Nick Wayne) defended the AEW TNT Championship against Daniel Garcia. In the opening stages, Cage delivered a swinging neckbreaker and a crossbody to Garcia onto the floor. Nick attempted to attack Garcia, but Garcia delivered a back body drop to him over the barricade. Garcia then performed a dragon screw leg whip on Cage and stomped his ankle. As the referee was being distracted by Cage, Killswitch performed a chokeslam to Garcia, allowing Cage to perform a diving splash for a nearfall. Cage attempted a spear, but his knee buckled, allowing Garcia to perform a piledriver for a nearfall. Garcia then performed a jacknife pin, but Cage reached the ropes. Mother Wayne distracted the referee, allowing Nick to attack Garcia. Cage then delivered the Killswitch and pinned Garcia to retain.

Next, Eddie Kingston defended the Continental Crown Championship against Bryan Danielson with the added stipulation that if Kingston won, Danielson would have to shake Kingston's hand out of respect. In the opening stages, Kingston delivered a saito suplex and a suicide dive to Danielson. Danielson then performed a suplex to Kingston from the apron to the floor. Kingston then delivered an exploder suplex and a DDT for a two count. Danielson then performed a PK and a dragon suplex to Kingston for a two count. Danielson then hit an avalanche butterfly suplex and locked in the LeBell Lock, but Kingston reached the ropes. Kingston delivered a spinning backfist and a Northern Lights Bomb for a nearfall. Danielson then performed the Busaiku Knee to Kingston for a nearfall. Kingston then delivered three half-and-half suplexes, a clothesline, and a powerbomb to Danielson and pinned him to retain the Continental Crown Championship as well as a handshake of respect from Danielson.

After that was an All Star Scramble match where the winner received a future AEW World Championship match. The eight participants were Wardlow, Dante Martin, Brian Cage, Hook, Lance Archer, Magnus, Chris Jericho, and Powerhouse Hobbs. In the opening stages, Dante delivered a suicide dive to Hobbs and Magnus performed a tornillo dive to Archer. Dante then hit a frog splash to Cage. Magnus delivered a cutter to Jericho for a two count. Magnus performed a double underhook backbreaker and a running double knees in the corner to Dante. Archer then chokeslammed Magnus, while Jericho and Magnus performed stereo lionsaults to Archer. Wardlow delivered German suplexes to Cage, Archer, Magnus, and Dante. Hook then performed a Northern Lights suplex to Jericho, but Hobbs broke up the pin attempt. Hobbs then delivered the World's Most Dangerous Slam to Jericho on the floor. Cage then hit a jumping knee strike and the F-10 to Hook. Wardlow then delivered a lariat and a powerbomb to Cage. Wardlow then performed a headbutt and a lariat to Hook and then delivered The Last Ride to Dante and pinned him to win.

In the fourth match, Orange Cassidy defended the AEW International Championship against Roderick Strong. Undisputed Kingdom stablemates Matt Taven and Mike Bennett had accompanied Strong but Strong sent them to the back before the match started. In the opening stages, Cassidy delivered a suicide dive to Strong on the outside and a diving crossbody for a two count. Strong then performed a gutwrench powerbomb to Cassidy onto the turnbuckle. Strong attempted the End of Heartache, but Cassidy countered it into a Stundog Millionaire. Cassidy then delivered a satellite DDT and a diving tornado DDT to Strong for a two count. Cassidy then performed the Panama Sunrise to Strong for a nearfall. Cassidy attempted the Orange Punch, but Strong intercepted it with a half-and-half backbreaker. Strong then delivered a jumping knee, but Cassidy responded with the Orange Punch and then the Beach Break, but Strong reached the bottom rope. Cassidy attempted another Orange Punch, but Strong impeded it with a jumping knee and then delivered the End of Heartache to win the title. After the match, Kyle O'Reilly made his AEW return, having been out with a neck injury since June 2022. O'Reilly hugged Strong, while Bennett and Taven offered him an Undisputed Kingdom T-shirt. O'Reilly, however, gave it back to Strong and then whispered something in his ear before leaving.

Next, Blackpool Combat Club (Jon Moxley and Claudio Castagnoli) faced FTR (Dax Harwood and Cash Wheeler). In the opening stages, Moxley delivered a superplex to Wheeler for a two count. Harwood performed a short-arm lariat to Moxley and a schoolboy pin to Claudio for a two count. Claudio then hit a lariat on Wheeler and a powerslam to Harwood for a two count. Blackpool Combat Club then performed an assisted Air Raid Crash to Harwood for a nearfall. FTR then delivered an assisted spile piledriver to Claudio for a two count. Claudio then hit a European uppercut to Harwood while Harwood was on Moxley's shoulder for a two count. Moxley then delivered a cutter to Harwood, while Claudio performed the Giant Swing on Wheeler. FTR then performed a powerbomb/leaping leg drop on Moxley for a two count. FTR then delivered the Shatter Machine on Moxley for a nearfall. Claudio hit the Neutralizer to Wheeler on the floor and then Harwood delivered a piledriver to Claudio on the floor. Moxley performed the Paradigm Shift to Harwood for a two count. Moxley then locked in a headscissors submission on Harwood, forcing him to pass out, giving Blackpool Combat Club the win by technical submission.

After that, "Timeless" Toni Storm (accompanied by Mariah May and Luther the Butler) defended the AEW Women's World Championship against Deonna Purrazzo. In the closing stages, Storm delivered a running hip attack and a DDT to Purrazzo for a two count. Purrazzo then performed a tieres driver and then locked in the Venus de Milo. Storm tapped out, but the referee did not see it due to Luther's distraction. May attempted to distract Purrazzo, but Purrazzo attacked her. Storm then delivered the Storm Zero to Purrazzo and pinned her to retain.

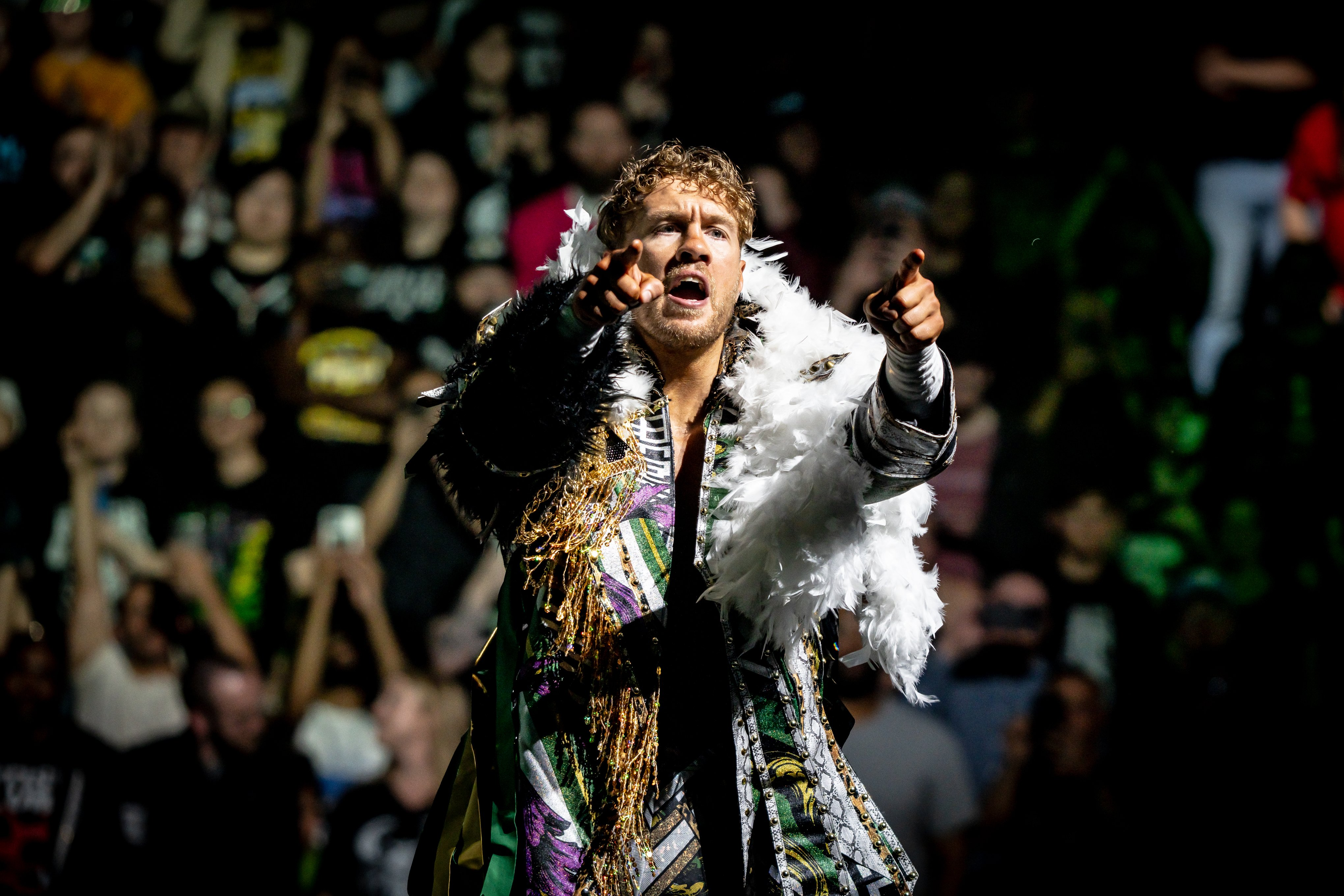
Will Ospreay making his entrance during the event

Next, Will Ospreay faced fellow Don Callis Family member Konosuke Takeshita in what was Ospreay's first official match as a member of the AEW roster. In the opening stages, Ospreay performed a hurricarana and a springboard elbow to Takeshita. Ospreay then delivered a handspring enzeguiri to Takeshita. Ospreay then performed a plancha and back suplex on Takeshita for a one count. Takeshita delivered a stalling superplex and an inverted F-10 to Ospreay. Takeshita performed a tope com Hilo and attempted a diving senton, but Ospreay got the knees up. Ospreay attempted the Sky Twister Press, but Takeshita dodged and delivered a German suplex for a two count. Ospreay hit a Spanish Fly and a superkick to Takeshita. Ospreay performed Kawada Kicks and a Tiger Driver for a two count. Ospreay attempted the OsCutter, but Takeshita intercepted it with a Blue Thunder Bomb for a nearfall. Ospreay then performed a springboard OsCutter on Takeshita for a two count. Ospreay attempted the Hidden Blade, but Takeshita impeded it with a lariat for a two count. Takeshita then delivered an avalanche brainbuster to Ospreay for a nearfall. Takeshita then performed a Powerdrive Knee for another nearfall. Ospreay then delivered a Stundog Millionaire and a poisonrana to Takeshita. Takeshita then delivered a wheelbarrow suplex to Ospreay, but Ospreay kipped up and delivered the Hidden Blade to Takeshita for a one count. Takeshita attempted another Powerdrive Knee, but Ospreay countered into a powerbomb and then performed the Styles Clash on Takeshita for a nearfall. Ospreay then performed a Tiger Driver '91 and then the Hidden Blade to Takeshita and pinned him to win the match. After the match, Don Callis and fellow United Empire member Kyle Fletcher embraced him.

In the penultimate match, Samoa Joe defended the AEW World Championship against "Hangman" Adam Page and Swerve Strickland. In the opening stages, Joe delivered an enzeguiri and a belly-to-belly suplex to Page. Joe then performed a powerbomb to Page for a one count and then immediately transitioned into the STF, but Strickland broke up the submission. Strickland and Page then delivered an assisted powerbomb to Joe. Midway through the match, Strickland performed a corner DDT, a 450° splash, and the Swerve Stomp to Joe and pinned him, but Page pulled the referee out of the ring to stop the pin count. Page then hit Strickland with the title belt and delivered two Buckshot Lariats to Joe, but there was no referee to count the pin. Referee Bryce Remsburg then came down to the ring to count, but Joe kicked out. Joe then locked in the Coquina Clutch submission on Page, but Strickland performed a Spiral Tap on both men to break up the submission. Page then started beating up Remsburg and then delivered an enzeguiri to Joe and a Buckshot Lariat to Strickland. Page delivered another Buckshot Lariat to Joe and Strickland delivered a Buckshot Lariat of his own to Page from the top rope followed by the JML Driver, but Joe delivered a half-and-half suplex to Strickland through the ropes. Joe then locked in the Coquina Clutch submission and Page tapped out for Joe to retain.

=== Main event ===
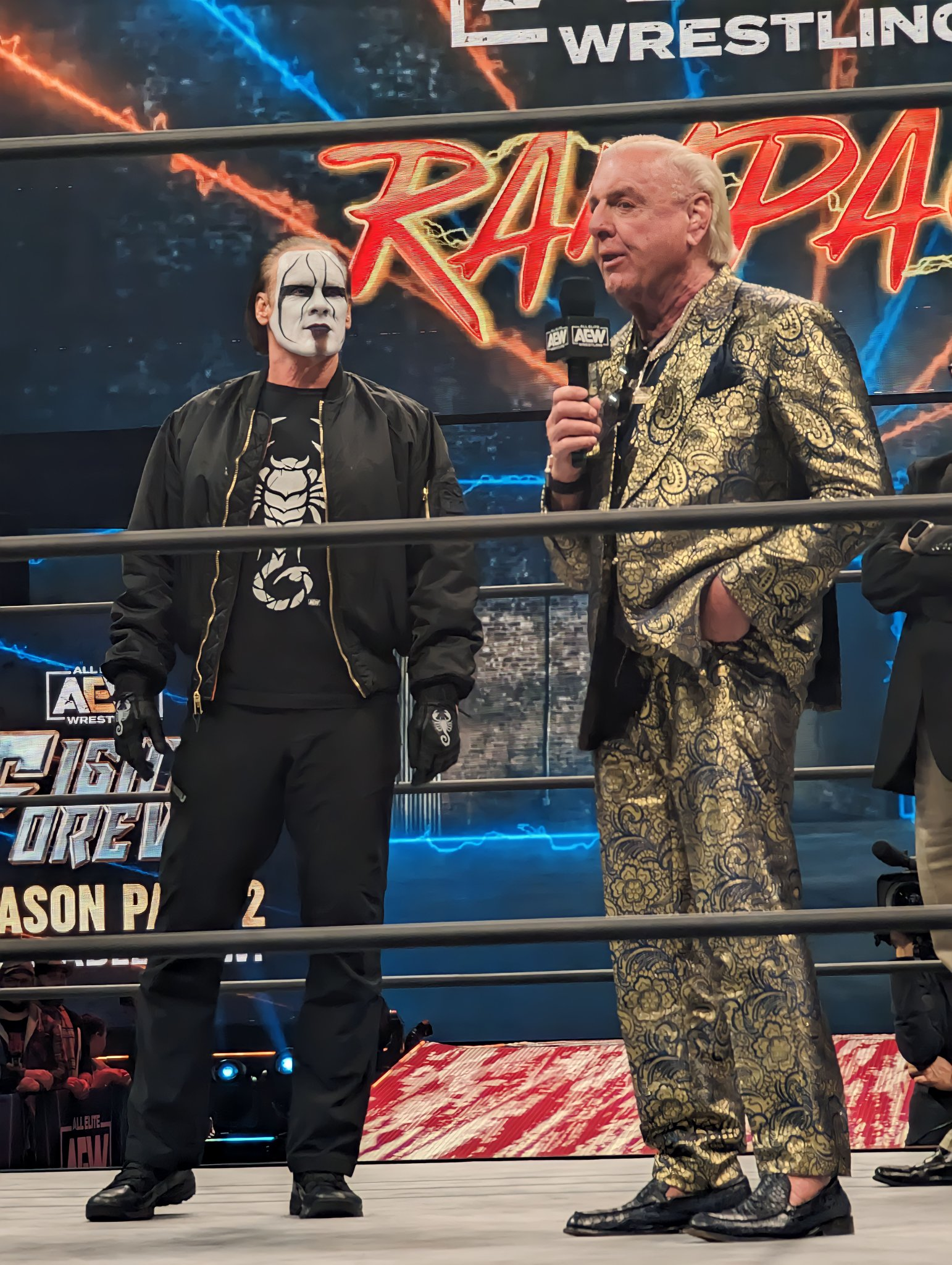
Sting (left) and Ric Flair (right) on an episode of AEW Rampage in November 2023. The Greensboro Coliseum was chosen as the location for Sting's retirement match as it was where Sting faced Flair for the NWA World Heavyweight Championship at Clash of the Champions I in March 1988, which is considered to be the match that established Sting as a top wrestler in the industry.

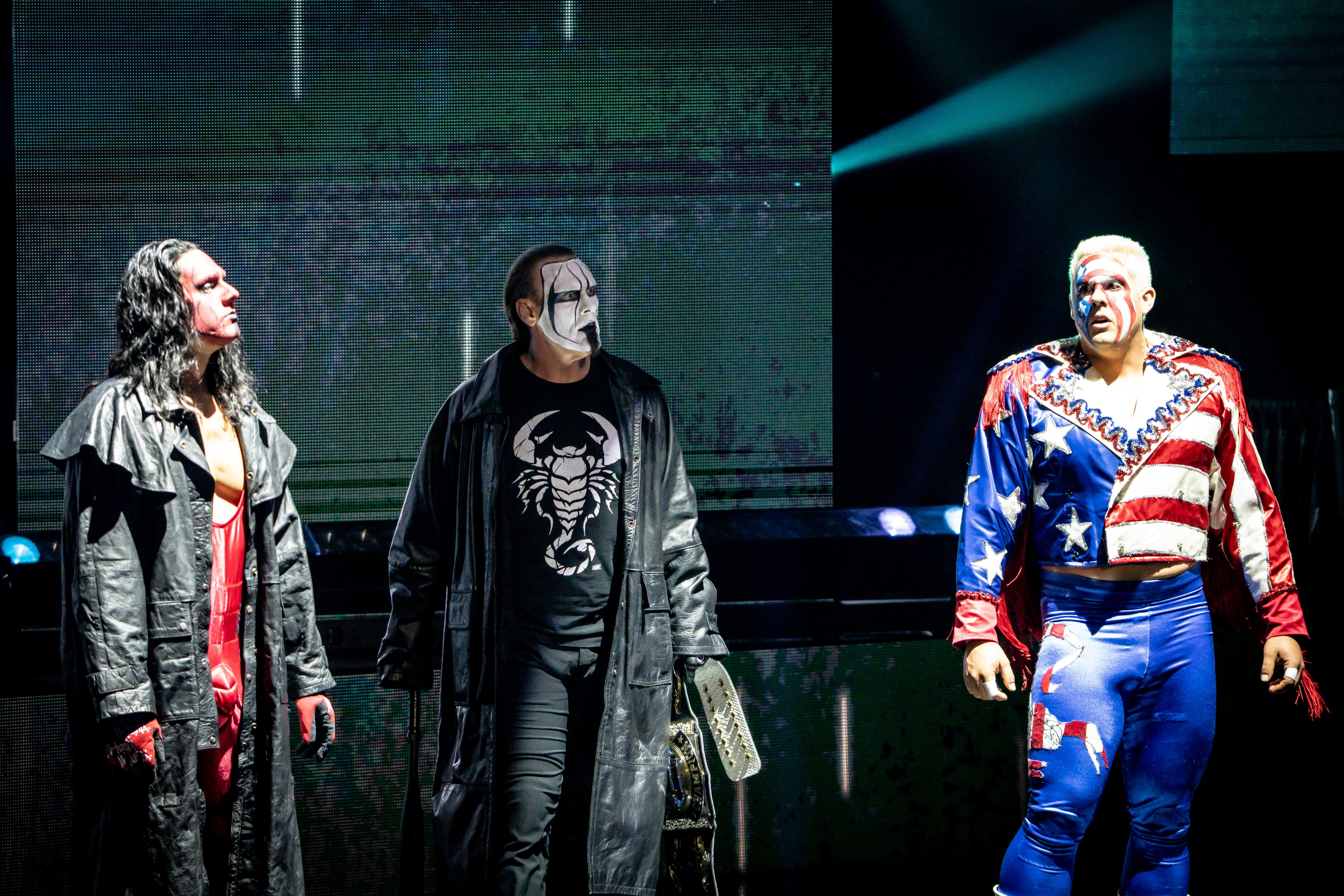
During his entrance, which included Metallica's "Seek & Destroy", Sting was accompanied by his two sons, Garrett (right) and Steven (left). Garrett portrayed the "Surfer Sting" era of his father's career, while Steven portrayed Sting's time in the nWo Wolfpac.

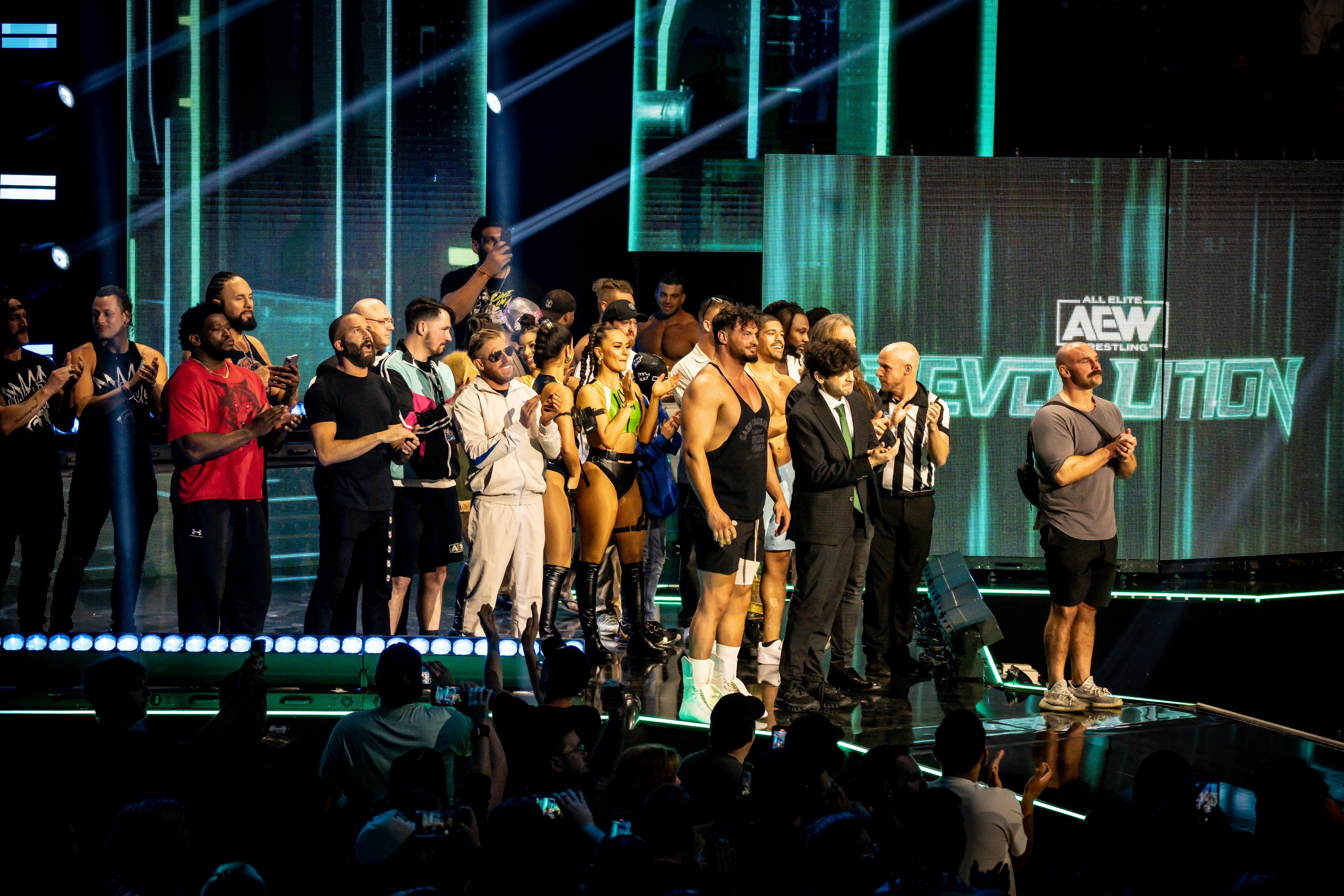
Following the conclusion of the main event, the AEW roster emptied out onto the stage and gave Sting a standing ovation.

The main event was Sting's retirement match, in which he and Darby Allin (accompanied by Ric Flair and Sting's sons, Garrett Borden and Steven Borden Jr.) defended the AEW World Tag Team Championship against The Young Bucks (Matthew Jackson and Nicholas Jackson) in a tornado tag team match. Ricky "The Dragon" Steamboat served as the special guest timekeeper for the match, while Sting's sons were dressed up as two of his previous personas: Garrett as the red, white, and blue Surfer Sting (the same gear Sting wore when he defeated Flair for his first world title in 1990) and Steven as the red and black nWo Wolfpac Sting. Sting came out to one of his previous entrance songs, Metallica's "Seek & Destroy", which prompted a positive reaction from the audience, who also sang along to the song's chorus ("Searching, seek & destroy!"). Sting and Darby Allin also came out to Seek & Destroy at the previous year's All In event.

In the opening stages, Allin delivered a suicide dive to The Bucks. Allin and Sting then delivered stereo Stinger Splashes to The Bucks and Sting's sons, Garrett and Steven, also delivered Stinger Splashes to the Bucks. Sting performed a spinebuster to Matthew and locked in a double Scorpion Death Lock on the Bucks, but the Bucks escaped. Sting and Allin then delivered a military press slam/Coffin Drop combination to Matthew. Nicholas then performed a Falcon Arrow to Allin through a table off the stage. Sting attempted a Scorpion Death Drop, but Matthew escaped and delivered a superplex to him off the stage. The Bucks then performed a double powerbomb to Allin onto a ladder. Allin delivered a Code Red to Matthew and a Stundog Millionaire to Nicholas. Sting then set up two panes of glass on top of chairs. Allin then placed Nicholas on the glass panes and attempted to deliver a diving senton off a ladder to Nicholas through the glass on the chairs, but Matthew pulled Nicholas away and Allin crashed through the glass and chairs.

In the ring, Nicholas hit Sting with a low blow and powerbombed him through the table, but Sting got up and The Bucks tossed him through a glass pane. Matthew then delivered another low blow to Sting and a Scorpion Death Drop for a two count. Matthew attempted to collect the title belt to attack Sting with, but Steamboat thrusted his throat. The Bucks then delivered double superkicks to both Flair and Steamboat. Matthew then hit Sting with the title belt for a two count. The Bucks then delivered double superkicks to Sting, but Sting responded with a Scorpion Death Drop to Nicholas, but Matthew broke up the pin attempt. The Bucks then delivered the EVP Trigger to Sting for a nearfall. The Bucks performed another EVP Trigger to Sting for a one count. The Bucks delivered another double superkick to Sting and attempted the Tony Khan (TK) Driver, but Allin stopped it and threw Nicholas through a table. Sting delivered a Scorpion Death Drop to Matthew for a two count. Allin then hit a Coffin Drop to Matthew and Sting locked in the Scorpion Death Lock on Matthew, forcing Matthew to tap out, with Sting and Allin retaining the titles. As a result of this win, Sting retired undefeated in AEW as well as champion. The event ended with confetti showering over Sting and Allin as they posed with the belts, with Sting thanking Greensboro, Flair, and Allin as well as everyone else involved in the event.

== Reception ==
The event received critical acclaim for its match quality and Sting's retirement, with the Ospreay-Takeshita bout singled out for notable praise.

Erik Beaston of Bleacher Report graded the show an A, saying "There were two legitimate Match of the Year contenders here in Kingston vs. Danielson and Ospreay vs. Takeshita, and everything else ranged from good to great. Most importantly, the show was sold on the back of Sting's retirement match and the main event lived up to expectations. The greatest avenger in wrestling history once again thwarted the plans of the evil and unjust, sending fans home happy and bringing an end to his career. Everything that hit did, mostly, and the result was a great way to kick off the company's PPV slate here in 2024".

Reviewing the event for 411MANIA, Thomas Hall generally praised the event, particularly the main event, the Ospreay-Takeshita bout, and the FTR/BCC match. He summed up the event as "where the good was excellent, and the worst was still fine." Steve Cook, also writing for the same website, echoed Hall's praise, stating "Sting got to go out on his own terms, as he should have. As long as that happened I was going to rate this show way too high for some people to handle." He noted that AEW still has some problems to sort out, but that "this particular night went as well as possible."

Dave Meltzer of the Wrestling Observer Newsletter rated the ten-man tag match and the Statlander and Willow vs. Hart and Blue match 2 stars (the lowest rated matches on the card), the TNT Championship match 3.75 stars, the Continental Crown Championship match, the BCC–FTR bout and the main event AEW World Tag Team Championship match 4.75 stars, the All-Star Scramble 3.25 stars, The International Championship match 4 stars, the AEW Women's World Championship match 2.75 stars, the Ospreay-Takeshita match 5.75 stars (the highest rated match on the card), and the AEW World Championship triple threat match 4.5 stars.

During the event, Allin performed a jump from a ladder to a glass panel. The spot was harshly criticized by PWInsider's Dave Scherer, pointing that "AEW crossed a line that should never, ever be crossed". Eric Bischoff also complained about the spot, stating that "it didn't do anything at all for the match". Tony Khan answered these complains, pointing the security and planification before the spot took place.

== Aftermath ==
During the post-event media scrum, AEW president Tony Khan announced that due to Sting's retirement, the AEW World Tag Team Championship was vacated and there would be a tournament to crown new champions. The tournament would culminate at Dynasty, where the Young Bucks would defeat FTR in a ladder match to hold the AEW World Tag Team Championships for a record-setting third time.

On the following episode of Dynamite, Wardlow was scheduled to receive his AEW World Championship match against Samoa Joe the following week at Dynamite: Big Business, where Joe retained.

== Results ==
| No. | Results | Stipulations | Times |
|---|---|---|---|
| 1^{P} | The Bang Bang Scissor Gang (Max Caster, Anthony Bowens, Billy Gunn, Austin Gunn, Colten Gunn, and Jay White) defeated Jeff Jarrett, Satnam Singh, Jay Lethal, Willie Mack, and Private Party (Isiah Kassidy and Marq Quen) (with Sonjay Dutt and Karen Jarrett) by pinfall | 12-man tag team match | 12:25 |
| 2^{P} | Kris Statlander and Willow Nightingale defeated Julia Hart and Skye Blue by pinfall | Tag team match | 13:30 |
| 3 | Christian Cage (c) (with Killswitch, Mother Wayne, and Nick Wayne) defeated Daniel Garcia by pinfall | Singles match for the AEW TNT Championship | 16:50 |
| 4 | Eddie Kingston (c) defeated Bryan Danielson by pinfall | Singles match for the Continental Triple Crown Championship (AEW Continental Championship, ROH World Championship, and the NJPW Strong Openweight Championship); Since Danielson lost, he had to shake Kingston's hand. | 19:45 |
| 5 | Wardlow (with Adam Cole, Mike Bennett, and Matt Taven) defeated Chris Jericho, Powerhouse Hobbs, Lance Archer (with Jake Roberts), Hook, Brian Cage (with Prince Nana), Magnus, and Dante Martin by pinfall | All-Star Scramble match The winner received a future AEW World Championship match. | 15:45 |
| 6 | Roderick Strong defeated Orange Cassidy (c) by pinfall | Singles match for the AEW International Championship | 12:45 |
| 7 | Blackpool Combat Club (Jon Moxley and Claudio Castagnoli) defeated FTR (Dax Harwood and Cash Wheeler) by technical submission | Tag team match | 21:50 |
| 8 | "Timeless" Toni Storm (c) (with Mariah May and Luther) defeated Deonna Purrazzo by pinfall | Singles match for the AEW Women's World Championship | 12:15 |
| 9 | Will Ospreay defeated Konosuke Takeshita by pinfall | Singles match | 22:00 |
| 10 | Samoa Joe (c) defeated "Hangman" Adam Page and Swerve Strickland (with Prince Nana) by submission | Three-way match for the AEW World Championship | 19:40 |
| 11 | Sting and Darby Allin (c) (with Ric Flair, Garrett Borden, and Steven Borden Jr.) defeated The Young Bucks (Matthew Jackson and Nicholas Jackson) by submission | Tornado tag team match for the AEW World Tag Team Championship; This was also Sting's retirement match. | 21:03 |
(c) / – the champion(s) heading into the match; P / – the match was broadcast on the pre-show
