= AEW Dynasty (2026) =

All Elite Wrestling pay-per-view event

Dynasty
- Promotional poster featuring various AEW wrestlers
- Promotion: All Elite Wrestling
- Date: April 12, 2026
- City: Vancouver, British Columbia, Canada
- Venue: Rogers Arena
- Attendance: 9,136
- Buy rate: 145,000

Pay-per-view chronology
← Previous; Revolution	Next → Double or Nothing

Dynasty chronology
← Previous; 2025	Next → 2027

AEW in Canada chronology
← Previous; All Out	Next → Redemption

The 2026 Dynasty was a professional wrestling pay-per-view (PPV) event produced by All Elite Wrestling (AEW). It was the third annual Dynasty and took place on April 12, 2026, at Rogers Arena in Vancouver, British Columbia, Canada, marking the first AEW PPV to take place in Vancouver.

Thirteen matches were contested at the event, including four on the "Zero Hour" pre-show. In the main event, MJF defeated Kenny Omega to retain the AEW World Championship. In other prominent matches, FTR (Dax Harwood and Cash Wheeler) defeated Cope and Cage (Adam Copeland and Christian Cage) to retain the AEW World Tag Team Championship, Thekla defeated Jamie Hayter to retain the AEW Women's World Championship, and Jon Moxley defeated Will Ospreay to retain the AEW Continental Championship. The event also featured the return of Kyle O'Reilly as well as Kamille during the pre-show.

== Production ==
=== Background ===
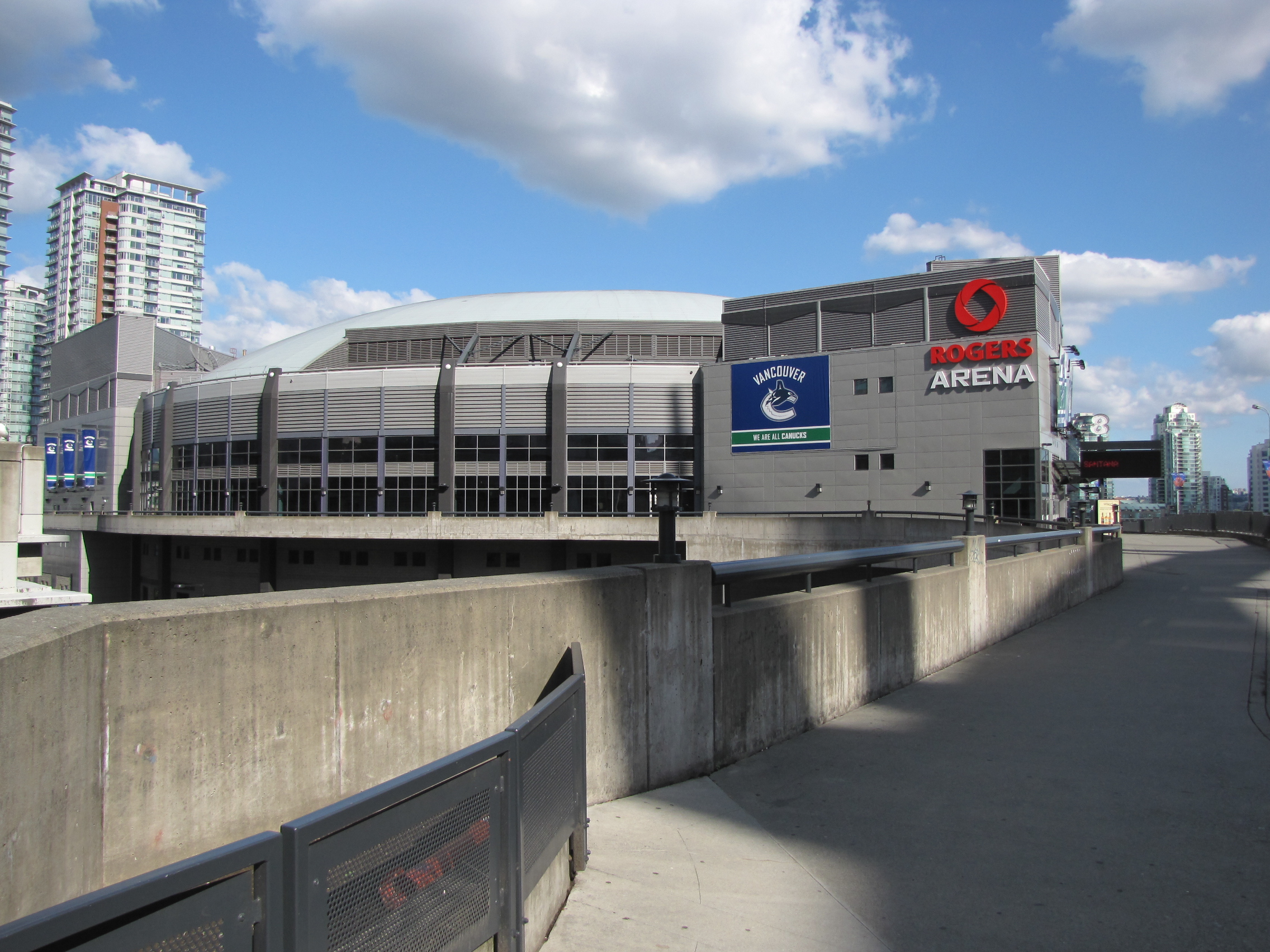
The 2026 Dynasty was held at Rogers Arena in Vancouver, British Columbia, Canada, marking All Elite Wrestling's first pay-per-view event held in Western Canada.

Dynasty is an annual professional wrestling pay-per-view (PPV) event produced every April by the American promotion All Elite Wrestling (AEW) since 2024. On December 15, 2025, it was announced that the third Dynasty event would take place on April 12, 2026, at Rogers Arena in Vancouver, British Columbia, Canada, marking AEW's third PPV to be held in Canada—following the 2023 Forbidden Door and the 2025 All Out—but the first to be held in Vancouver. Tickets for Dynasty went on sale December 22.

=== Broadcast ===
Dynasty aired via PPV through traditional cable and satellite providers. In the United States, AEW PPV events are available on HBO Max at an exclusive discounted rate for subscribers. The event was also available in the United States and internationally on Prime Video, Triller TV, PPV.com, and YouTube. Additionally in the United States, the show was broadcast at Dave & Buster's and Tom's Watch Bar locations. Outside of the United States and Canada, the event was available to stream on MyAEW.

=== Storylines ===
Other on-screen personnel
Role	Name
Commentators	Excalibur (Pre-show and PPV)
Commentators	Tony Schiavone (Pre-show and PPV)
Commentators	Nigel McGuinness (Pre-show and PPV)
Commentators	Bryan Danielson (PPV)
Commentators	Don Callis (Young Bucks vs. Don Callis Family)
Spanish Commentators	Carlos Cabrera
Spanish Commentators	Alvaro Riojas
Spanish Commentators	Ariel Levy
Ring announcers	Arkady Aura
Ring announcers	Justin Roberts
Referees	Aubrey Edwards
Referees	Bryce Remsburg
Referees	Mike Posey
Referees	Paul Turner
Referees	Rick Knox
Referees	Stephon Smith
Pre-show hosts	Renee Paquette
Pre-show hosts	RJ City
Pre-show hosts	Jeff Jarrett
Pre-show hosts	Paul Wight

Dynasty featured professional wrestling matches that involved different wrestlers from pre-existing feuds and storylines. Storylines were produced on AEW's weekly television programs, Dynamite and Collision.

== Aftermath ==
At Dynamite: Spring BreakThru on April 15, 2026, Darby Allin, defeated MJF to win the AEW World Championship.

== Results ==
No.	Results	Stipulations	Times
1^{P}	Alex Windsor defeated Marina Shafir by pinfall	Singles match	8:55
2^{P}	Kamille defeated Big Anne by pinfall	Singles match	1:25
3^{P}	Jack Perry (c) defeated Mark Davis by pinfall	Singles match for the AEW National Championship	8:30
4^{P}	Divine Dominion (Megan Bayne and Lena Kross) (c) defeated Hyan and Maya World by pinfall	Tag team match for the AEW Women's World Tag Team Championship	10:35
5	The Young Bucks (Matt Jackson and Nick Jackson) defeated The Don Callis Family (Kazuchika Okada and Konosuke Takeshita) (with Don Callis) by pinfall	Tag team match	19:55
6	Ricochet (with Bishop Kaun and Toa Liona) defeated Jericho by pinfall	Singles match	14:10
7	Darby Allin defeated Andrade El Ídolo by pinfall	Singles match Since Allin won, he received an AEW World Championship match, which Allin invoked for AEW Spring BreakThru on April 15, 2026.	16:30
8	FTR (Dax Harwood and Cash Wheeler) (c) (with Stokely) defeated Cope and Cage (Adam Copeland and Christian Cage) by pinfall	Tag team match for the AEW World Tag Team Championship	21:10
9	Kevin Knight won by pinning Daniel Garcia (Note: Order of entrants: Tommaso Ciampa, Rush, Bandido, "Speedball" Mike Bailey, El Clon, Pac, Daniel Garcia, Anthony Bowens, Kevin Knight, and Wheeler Yuta.)	10-man Casino Gauntlet match for the vacant AEW TNT Championship	21:05
10	Thekla (c) defeated Jamie Hayter by pinfall	Singles match for the AEW Women's World Championship	17:00
11	Jon Moxley (c) defeated Will Ospreay by pinfall	Singles match for the AEW Continental Championship	18:00
12	The Conglomeration (Orange Cassidy, Roderick Strong, and Kyle O'Reilly) defeated The Dogs (David Finlay, Clark Connors, and Gabe Kidd) (c) by submission	Trios match for the AEW World Trios Championship	10:00
13	MJF (c) defeated Kenny Omega by pinfall	Singles match for the AEW World Championship	39:00
(c) / – the champion(s) heading into the match; P / – the match was broadcast on the pre-show
