= AEW Dynasty =

All Elite Wrestling pay-per-view event series

- AEW Dynasty logo
- Promotions: All Elite Wrestling
- First event: 2024

AEW Dynasty is a professional wrestling pay-per-view (PPV) event produced by All Elite Wrestling (AEW). Established in 2024, it is held annually in April. The first Dynasty was notable for being AEW's first PPV event held in Missouri while the second was the company's first PPV event in Pennsylvania, with the third being the first to be held in Vancouver, British Columbia, Canada.

== History ==
On February 22, 2024, the American professional wrestling promotion All Elite Wrestling (AEW) filed to trademark the name "Dynasty". At Revolution on March 3, 2024, AEW announced that it would hold a pay-per-view (PPV) event titled Dynasty on April 21, 2024, at the Chaifetz Arena in St. Louis, Missouri, marking AEW's first PPV event to be held in the state. In January 2025, AEW announced that the second edition of Dynasty would take place on April 6, 2025, at the Liacouras Center in Philadelphia, Pennsylvania, marking AEW's first PPV event in Pennsylvania and establishing Dynasty as an annual PPV held in April.

== Events ==
#	Event	Date	City	Venue	Main event	Ref.
1	Dynasty (2024)	April 21, 2024	St. Louis, Missouri	Chaifetz Arena	Samoa Joe (c) vs. Swerve Strickland for the AEW World Championship	
2	Dynasty (2025)	April 6, 2025	Philadelphia, Pennsylvania	Liacouras Center	Jon Moxley (c) vs. Swerve Strickland for the AEW World Championship	
3	Dynasty (2026)	April 12, 2026	Vancouver, British Columbia, Canada	Rogers Arena	MJF (c) vs. Kenny Omega for the AEW World Championship	
4	Dynasty (2027)	February 7, 2027	Liverpool, England	Liverpool Arena	TBA	
(c) – refers to the champion(s) heading into the match

== See also ==
- List of All Elite Wrestling pay-per-view events
