= AEW Dynasty (2027) =

All Elite Wrestling pay-per-view event

Dynasty
- Promotional poster featuring all AEW championships
- Promotion: All Elite Wrestling
- Date: February 7, 2027
- City: Liverpool, England
- Venue: M&S Bank Arena

Pay-per-view chronology
← Previous; Worlds End	Next → —

Dynasty chronology
← Previous; 2026	Next → —

AEW in the United Kingdom chronology
← Previous; All In	Next → —

The 2027 Dynasty is an upcoming professional wrestling pay-per-view (PPV) event produced by All Elite Wrestling (AEW). It will be the fourth annual Dynasty and is scheduled to take place on February 7, 2027, at M&S Bank Arena in Liverpool, England. This will be the first Dynasty to take place in the month of February, as the last three were held in April.

== Production ==
=== Background ===
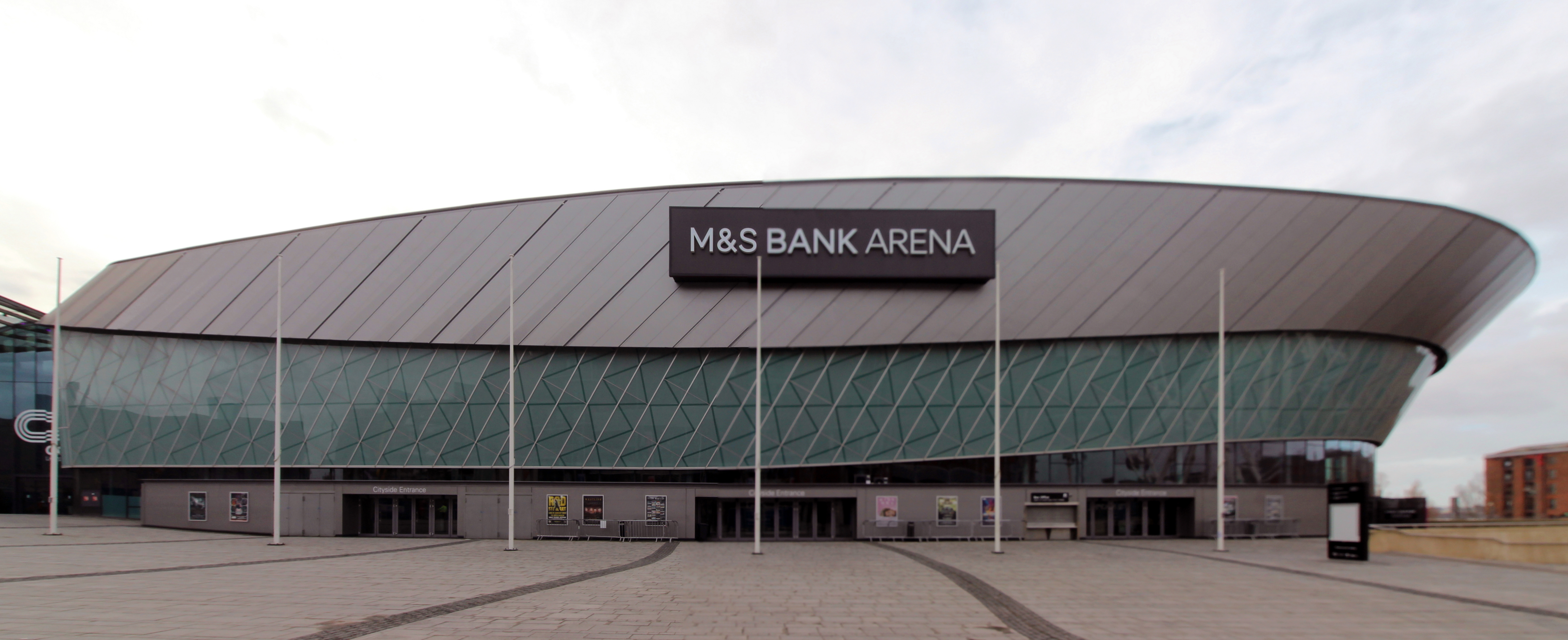
The event will be held at M&S Bank Arena in Liverpool, England.

Dynasty is an annual professional wrestling pay-per-view (PPV) event produced every April by the American promotion All Elite Wrestling (AEW) since 2024. During All In on August 30, 2026, it was announced that the fourth annual Dynasty will be held on February 7, 2027, at M&S Bank Arena in Liverpool, England.

=== Storylines ===
Dynasty will feature professional wrestling matches that involve different wrestlers from pre-existing scripted feuds and storylines. Storylines are produced on AEW's weekly television programs, Dynamite and Collision.
