= AEW Dynasty (2025) =

All Elite Wrestling pay-per-view event

Dynasty
- Promotional poster featuring various AEW wrestlers
- Promotion: All Elite Wrestling
- Date: April 6, 2025
- City: Philadelphia, Pennsylvania
- Venue: Liacouras Center
- Attendance: 7,921
- Buy rate: 115,000

Pay-per-view chronology
← Previous; Revolution	Next → Double or Nothing

Dynasty chronology
← Previous; 2024	Next → 2026

The 2025 Dynasty was a professional wrestling pay-per-view (PPV) event produced by All Elite Wrestling (AEW). It was the second annual Dynasty and took place on April 6, 2025, at the Liacouras Center in Philadelphia, Pennsylvania, marking AEW's first PPV event to be held in Pennsylvania.

Twelve matches were contested at the event, including two on the "Zero Hour" pre-show. In the main event, Jon Moxley defeated Swerve Strickland to retain the AEW World Championship. In other prominent matches, Kenny Omega defeated Ricochet and "Speedball" Mike Bailey in a three-way match to retain the AEW International Championship and Adam Cole defeated Daniel Garcia to win the AEW TNT Championship. The event also featured the return of The Young Bucks (Matthew Jackson and Nicholas Jackson) following a hiatus since October 2024.

== Production ==
=== Background ===
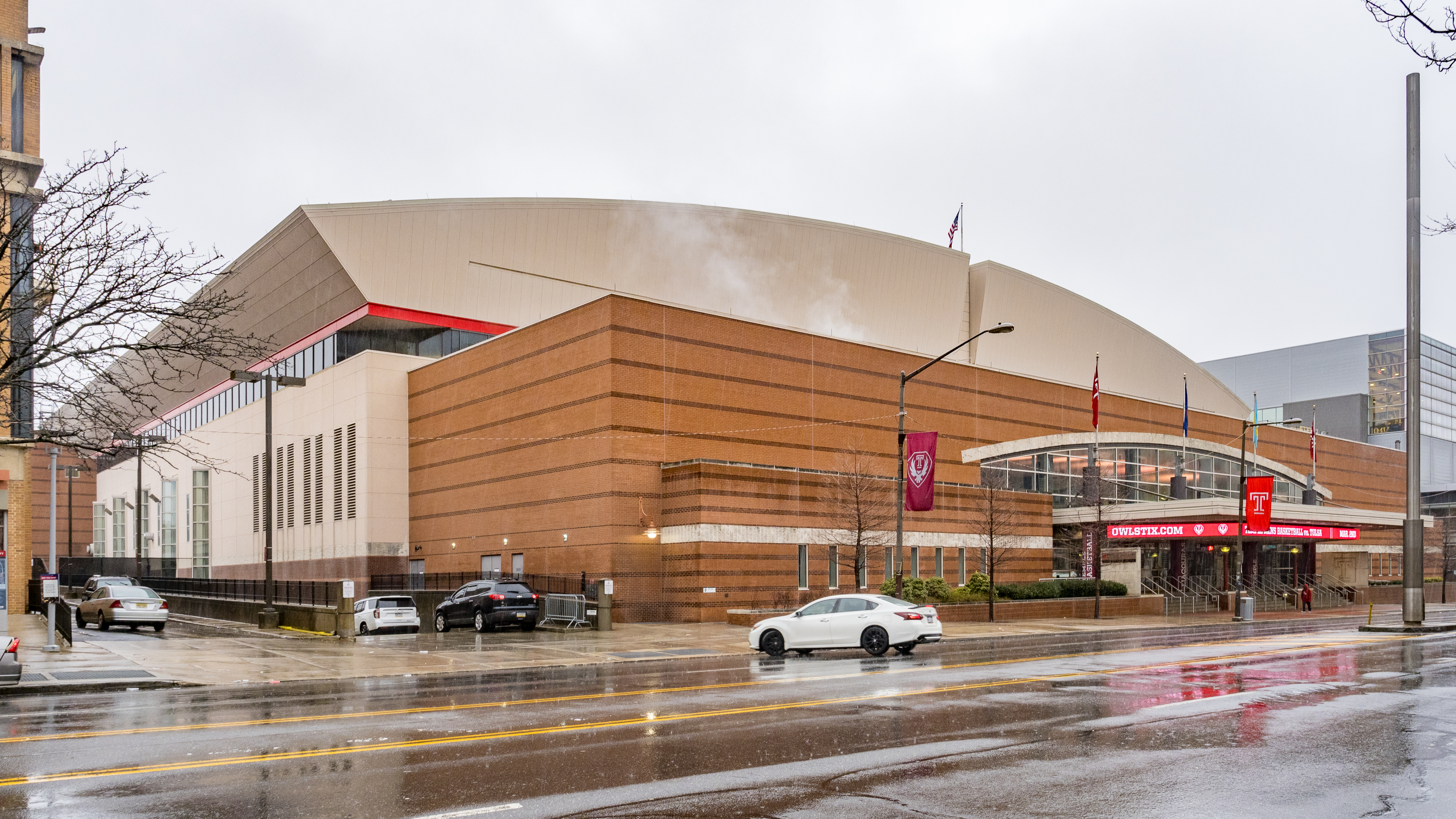
The 2025 Dynasty was held at the Liacouras Center in Philadelphia, Pennsylvania, marking All Elite Wrestling's first pay-per-view event to be held in the state.

In April 2024, the American professional wrestling promotion All Elite Wrestling (AEW) held a pay-per-view (PPV) event titled Dynasty. On January 22, 2025, it was announced that a second Dynasty event would take place on April 6 that year at the Liacouras Center in Philadelphia, Pennsylvania, marking AEW's first PPV event to be held in Pennsylvania, thus establishing Dynasty as an annual PPV event for AEW.

=== Storylines ===
Dynasty featured professional wrestling matches that involved different wrestlers from pre-existing scripted feuds and storylines, written by AEW's writers. Storylines were produced on AEW's weekly television programs, Dynamite and Collision, as well as Ring of Honor's (ROH) weekly television program Ring of Honor Wrestling.

Other on-screen personnel
Role	Name
Commentators	Excalibur (Pre-show and PPV)
Commentators	Tony Schiavone (Pre-show and PPV)
Commentators	Taz (PPV)
Commentators	Nigel McGuinness (PPV)
Commentators	Jim Ross (Will Ospreay vs. Kevin Knight)
Commentators	Matt Menard (Pre-show)
Commentators	MVP (AEW World Tag Team Title match)
Commentators	Don Callis (Kyle Fletcher vs. Mark Briscoe)
Spanish Commentators	Carlos Cabrera
Spanish Commentators	Alvaro Riojas
Spanish Commentators	Ariel Levy
Ring announcer	Justin Roberts (PPV)
Ring announcer	Arkady Aura (Pre-show)
Referees	Aubrey Edwards
Referees	Bryce Remsburg
Referees	Mike Posey
Referees	Paul Turner
Referees	Rick Knox
Referees	Stephon Smith
Interviewer	Lexy Nair
Pre-show hosts	Renee Paquette
Pre-show hosts	RJ City
Pre-show hosts	Jeff Jarrett

== Results ==
No.	Results	Stipulations	Times
1^{P}	Nick Wayne and CRU (Action Andretti and Lio Rush) (with Kip Sabian and Mother Wayne) defeated AR Fox and Top Flight (Dante Martin and Darius Martin) (with Leila Grey) by pinfall	Trios match	11:15
2^{P}	Anthony Bowens (with Billy Gunn) defeated Max Caster by pinfall	Singles match	0:40
3	Will Ospreay defeated Kevin Knight by pinfall	Men's Owen Hart Cup Tournament Quarterfinal match	13:50
4	The Hurt Syndicate (Bobby Lashley and Shelton Benjamin) (c) (with MVP) defeated The Learning Tree (Big Bill and Bryan Keith) by pinfall	Tag team match for the AEW World Tag Team Championship	11:00
5	Mercedes Moné defeated Julia Hart by pinfall	Women's Owen Hart Cup Tournament Quarterfinal match	13:00
6	Death Riders (Claudio Castagnoli, Pac, and Wheeler Yuta) (c) defeated Rated FTR (Cope, Cash Wheeler, and Dax Harwood) by pinfall	Trios match for the AEW World Trios Championship	14:45
7	"Timeless" Toni Storm (c) (with Luther) defeated Megan Bayne (with Penelope Ford) by pinfall	Singles match for the AEW Women's World Championship	15:25
8	Kyle Fletcher (with Don Callis) defeated Mark Briscoe by pinfall	Men's Owen Hart Cup Tournament Quarterfinal match	16:15
9	Bandido defeated Chris Jericho (c) by pinfall	Title vs. Mask match for the ROH World Championship	18:15
10	Adam Cole defeated Daniel Garcia (c) by pinfall	Singles match for the AEW TNT Championship; This match had no time limit and outside interference was strictly prohibited.	15:35
11	Kenny Omega (c) defeated Ricochet and "Speedball" Mike Bailey by pinfall	Three-way match for the AEW International Championship	31:00
12	Jon Moxley (c) (with Marina Shafir) defeated Swerve Strickland (with Prince Nana) by pinfall	Singles match for the AEW World Championship	31:35
(c) / – the champion(s) heading into the match; P / – the match was broadcast on the pre-show

=== AEW International Championship Eliminator Tournament ===
Qualifiers; Dynamite (March 12); Collision (March 15)
(United States) Orange Cassidy	Pin
(Mexico) Hechicero	10:09
(Mexico) The Beast Mortos	10:57
(Canada) "Speedball" Mike Bailey	Pin
(Japan) Katsuyori Shibata	12:34
(United States) Ricochet	Pin
(United States) Mark Briscoe	12:15
(Australia) Mark Davis	Pin

Final; Dynamite (March 19)
(United States) Orange Cassidy	—
(Canada) "Speedball" Mike Bailey	Pin
(United States) Ricochet	Pin
(Australia) Mark Davis	17:57
