= Max Caster =

American professional wrestler (born 1990)

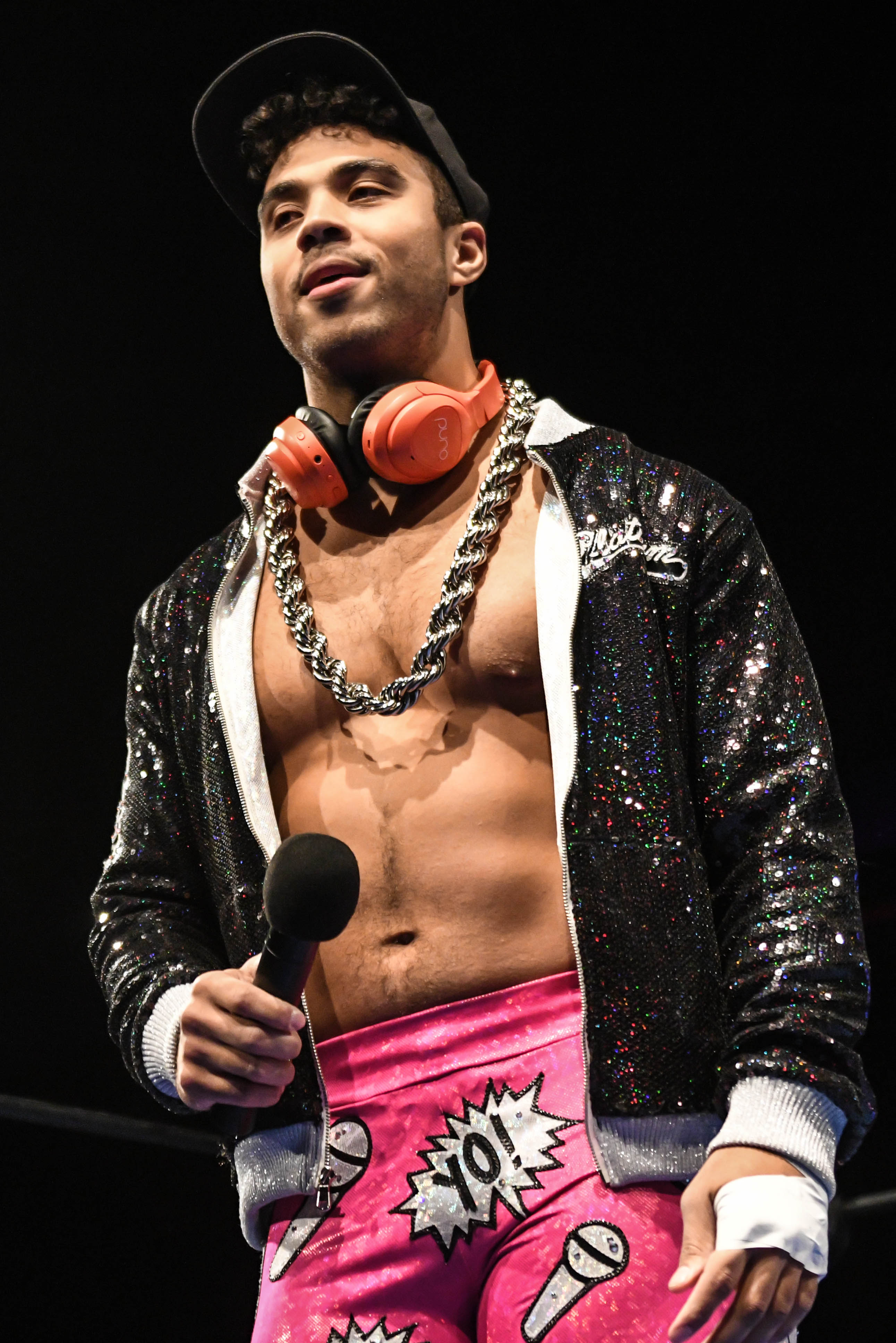
- Caster in 2022

Personal information
- Born: July 31, 1989 (age 37) Long Island, New York, U.S.
- Parent: Rich Caster (father)

Professional wrestling career
- Ring name(s): Max Caster; Frances
- Billed height: 6 ft 1 in (185 cm)
- Billed weight: 230 lb (104 kg)
- Billed from: Rockville Centre, New York
- Trained by: Brian Myers; Create A Pro Wrestling Academy; Pat Buck
- Debut: 2015
- Musical career
- Genre: Hip hop
- Instrument: Vocals
- Years active: 2020–present

Max Caster (born July 31, 1989) is an American professional wrestler and rapper. He is best known for his time in All Elite Wrestling (AEW).

He began his wrestling career in 2015 and signed with AEW in November 2020, beginning a team with Anthony Bowens and later Billy Gunn called The Acclaimed. As part of The Acclaimed, he became a former one-time AEW World Trios Champion and one-time AEW World Tag Team Champion.

== Professional wrestling career ==
=== Early career (2015–2020) ===
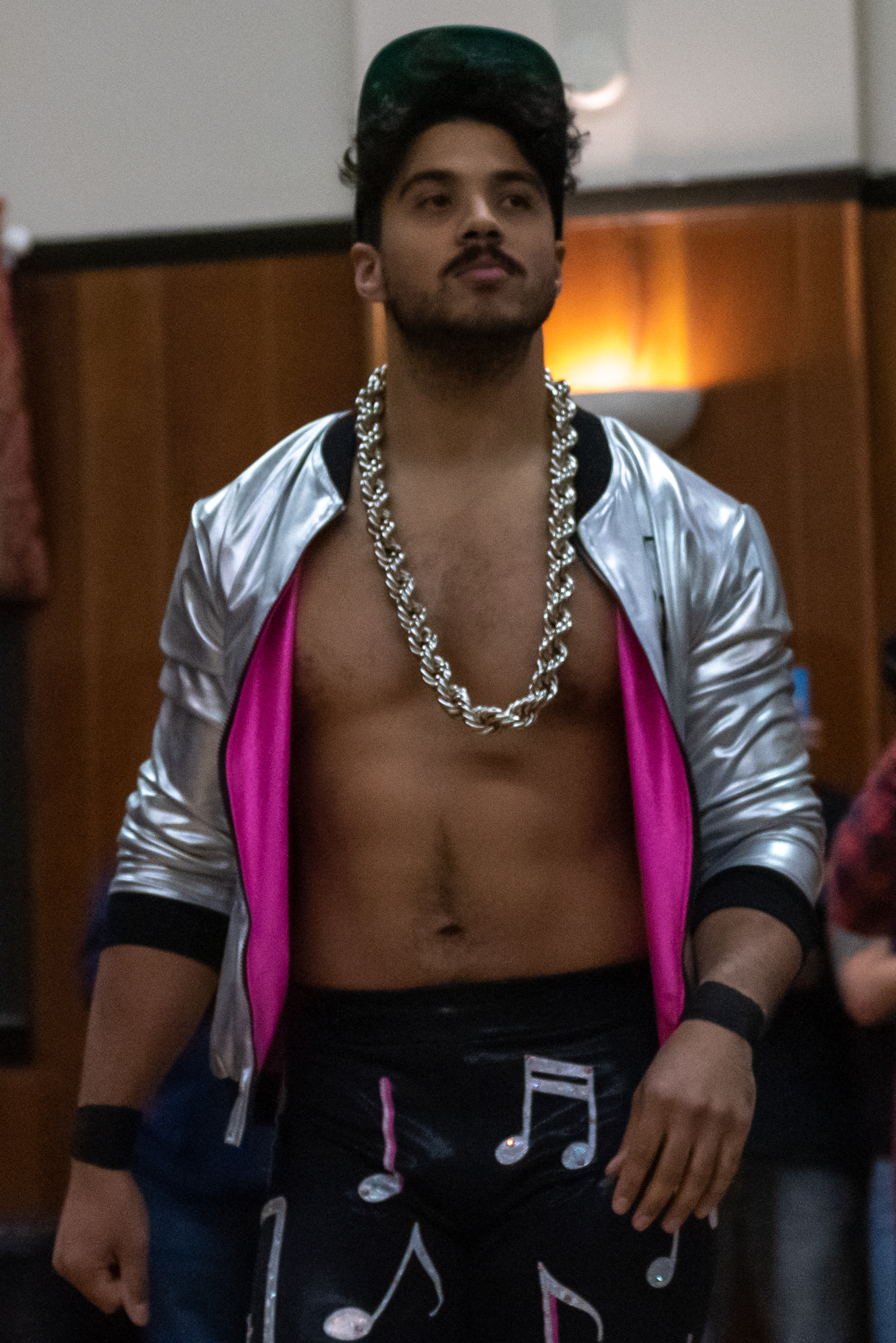
Caster in 2019

Caster trained under Brian Myers and Pat Buck at their Create A Pro Wrestling Academy and made his debut for the school's promotion in February 2015, later becoming the inaugural CAP Champion in December of that year. He wrestled on the independent circuit for a number of promotions including Combat Zone Wrestling. He also made a WWE appearance as Frances, one of Bobby Lashley's (kayfabe) sisters, on the May 21, 2018 episode of Raw.

=== All Elite Wrestling (2020–2026) ===
==== The Acclaimed (2020–2024) ====
Caster made his first appearance for All Elite Wrestling (AEW) on the June 23, 2020 episode of Dark as a heel, teaming with Luther and Serpentico in a losing effort against Jurassic Express (Jungle Boy, Luchasaurus and Marko Stunt). He came back with his new tag team partner Anthony Bowens on the October 27 episode of Dark but lost to Best Friends (Chuck Taylor and Trent). In November 2020, AEW President Tony Khan announced that Caster, alongside Bowens, had been signed to a five-year contract with the promotion. The announcement also stated that Bowens and Caster would compete as a tag team named The Acclaimed. Caster and Bowens made their first appearance on the December 16 episode of Dynamite, defeating SoCal Uncensored. The following week, Caster and Bowens unsuccessfully challenged The Young Bucks (Matt Jackson and Nick Jackson) for the AEW World Tag Team Championship.

On the March 3, 2021, episode of Dynamite, Caster defeated 10 to qualify for the Face of the Revolution ladder match at Revolution. However, at Revolution, the match was won by Scorpio Sky. At Double or Nothing on May 30, Caster competed in the Casino Battle Royale, but he was eliminated by Christian Cage. On the August 3 episode of Dark, while making his entrance, Caster rapped about subjects such as Olympic gymnast Simone Biles' mental health issues, the Duke lacrosse case, the validity of PCR COVID-19 testing, and made a sexual joke about Julia Hart. AEW owner Tony Khan called the rap "terrible", said it should have been edited out of the show and announced that he would personally be taking over the editing of the show. Caster was later removed from several independent events and AEW programming following the incident. He returned to action at Dark: Elevation on September 1.

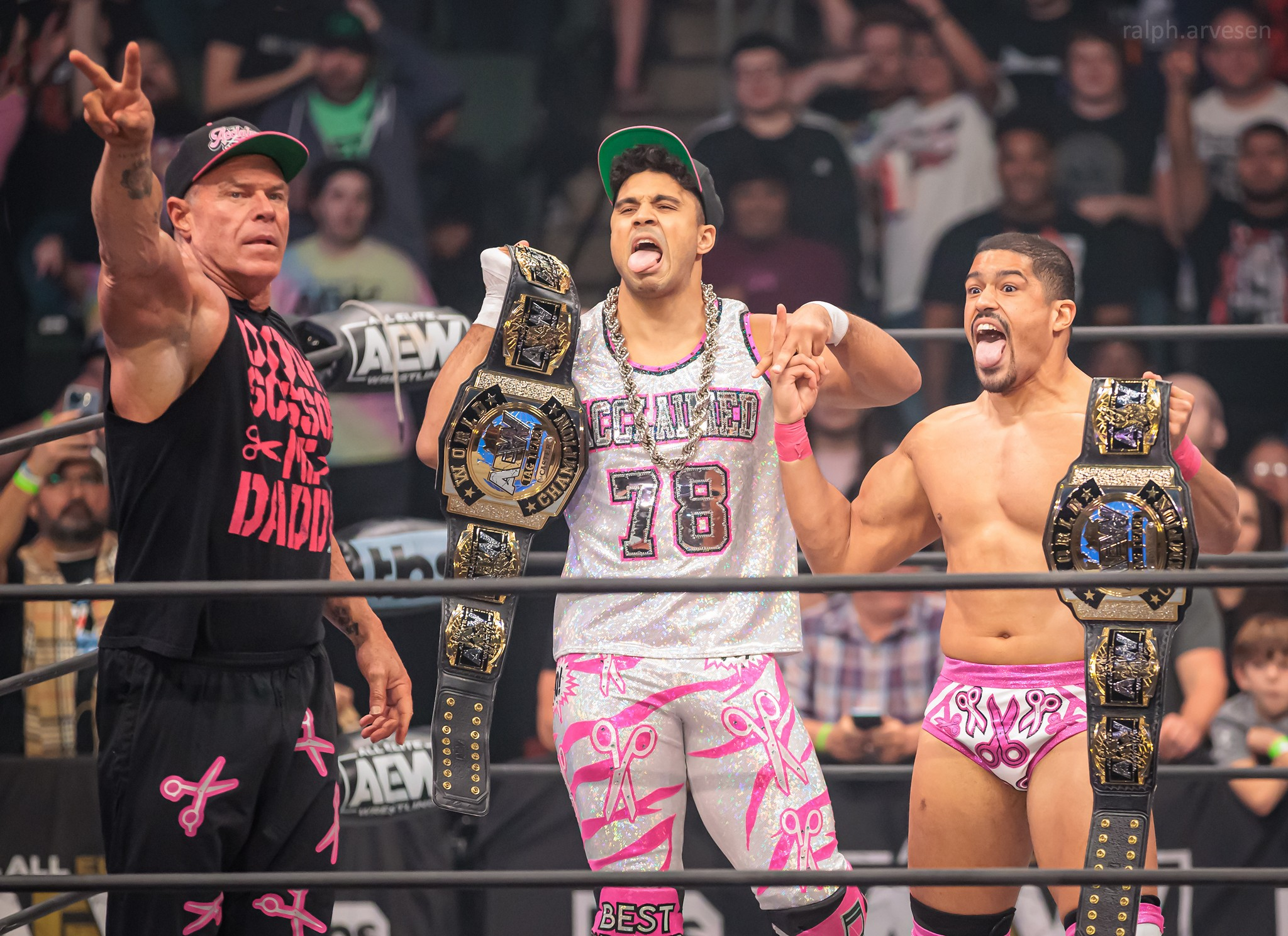
Billy Gunn, Caster and Anthony Bowens in 2022 during the Acclaimed's AEW World tag team title reign

Beginning in 2022, the Acclaimed allied with the Gunn Club (Billy Gunn and his sons Austin Gunn and Colten Gunn). On Dark and Dark: Elevation, the alliance defeated the Dark Order and later the team of Lee Johnson, Brock Anderson, Lee Moriarty, and Matt Sydal. Their alliance with the Gunns broke down and turned into a rivalry in mid-2022, leading to a "Dumpster Match" in August 2022, which the Acclaimed won. While Billy Gunn was initially caught between the two groups, his sons turned on him, having joined the Firm, leading to him becoming the Acclaimed's manager. In the latter half of 2022, the Acclaimed entered a feud with tag team champions Swerve in our Glory (Swerve Strickland and Keith Lee). At All Out of that year the Acclaimed challenged for tag team championships, although Strickland and Lee retained. After All Out, The Acclaimed turned face due to the favorable crowd reactions they would receive. The On September 21, 2022, at Grand Slam, The Acclaimed would win the AEW World Tag Team Championship from Swerve In Our Glory. On February 8, 2023, after 140 days as champions, they lost the championships to Colten and Austin Gunn on Dynamite.

At All In on August 27, Caster, Bowens and Billy won the AEW World Trios Championship from The House of Black. At Dynasty: Zero Hour on April 21, 2024, ROH World Six-Man Tag Team Champions Bullet Club Gold (Jay White, Austin Gunn and Colten Gunn) defeated Caster, Bowens, and Billy for the AEW World Trios Championship in a winner takes all championship unification match to unify the titles as the Unified World Trios Championship, ending their reign at a record 238 days.

The Acclaimed then began a feud with The Young Bucks, defeating them on the June 19 episode of Dynamite, in an eliminator match to earn a future shot at the AEW World Tag Team Championship. The Acclaimed were also a part of Team AEW that defeated The Elite in a Blood and Guts match on July 24 at the namesake event. On the August 14 episode of Dynamite, The Acclaimed's title match against The Young Bucks ended in a disqualification loss due to interference from FTR (Dax Harwood and Cash Wheeler). On August 25 at All In, The Acclaimed once again failed to win the titles from The Young Bucks in a three-way tag team match, also involving FTR.

==== "Best Wrestler Alive" (2024–2026) ====
Between November 2024 and January 2025, Caster began to tease a heel turn, referring to himself as the "best wrestler alive" and declaring himself as the leader of The Acclaimed. On January 18 (taped January 16) at the Collision edition of Maximum Carnage, Caster cemented his heel turn and disbanded The Acclaimed after Bowens chose to side with Gunn over him. After disbanding The Acclaimed, Caster adopted a new gimmick in which he began issuing open challenges for 5-minute exhibition matches on Dynamite and Collision, which inevitably resulted in him being defeated by his opponents in squash matches. On April 6 at Dynasty Zero Hour, Caster was defeated by former Acclaimed teammate Bowens, who answered his open challenge. On July 12 at All In, Caster competed in the men's Casino Gauntlet match, which was won by MJF.

On the July 26 episode of Collision, Caster began teasing a face turn after being assaulted by Bowens following a match between the two. On the September 13 episode of Collision, Caster reluctantly reunited with Bowens at the behest of Jerry Lynn to face The Swirl (Blake Christian and Lee Johnson). On the September 27 episode of Collision, Caster and Bowens teamed together to defeat The Swirl. For the rest of the year Caster and Bowens teased an odd-couple reunion storyline, reluctantly teaming together in a number of matches against various opponents. However the reunion was quietly dropped and Caster was removed from television at the end of 2025, with Bowens later joining The Opps in April 2026 with no mention of Caster. The rivalry between Caster and Bowens was subsequently named as Worst Feud of the Year for 2025 in the Wrestling Observer Newsletter Awards. On October 1, 2026, Caster's AEW contract expired and was not renewed, ending his six-year tenure with the company.

=== Total Nonstop Action Wrestling (2026) ===
Caster made his debut for Total Nonstop Action Wrestling (TNA) on October 11, 2026 at Bound for Glory, where he was defeated by Moose after answering an open challenge. During his entrance at the event, Caster performed a rap which included an unapproved line referencing the October 2026 Houthi attacks on Saudi Arabian airports. The following day, TNA removed references to Caster's debut from its social media accounts, issued a public apology, and announced his release from the company. On October 13, Caster issued a personal apology regarding the incident, stating that he did not intend to offend anyone with his remarks and expressed regret over the situation. Four days later at an independent show, Caster announced that he would be taking a hiatus from professional wrestling and enter therapy.

== Professional wrestling style and persona ==
Caster is known for his hip hop-inspired persona, often rapping to diss his opponents during his entrance. He uses a diving elbow drop called The Mic Drop as his finisher.

== Music career ==
Caster released his debut album, Critically Acclaimed, Vol.1, in May 2021, under the name Platinum Max.

He provided several original tracks for the soundtrack to AEW's first video game release AEW Fight Forever, which were later made available to stream as a collection titled "Songs From a Video Game". Caster also makes an appearance in the music video for "Grateful" by Atmosphere.

== Personal life ==
Caster's father is former NFL player Rich Caster. Caster's father died on February 2, 2024.

He is related to rapper DC2trill.

== Discography ==
=== Mixtapes ===
- Critically Acclaimed, Vol.1 (2021)

== Championships and accomplishments ==
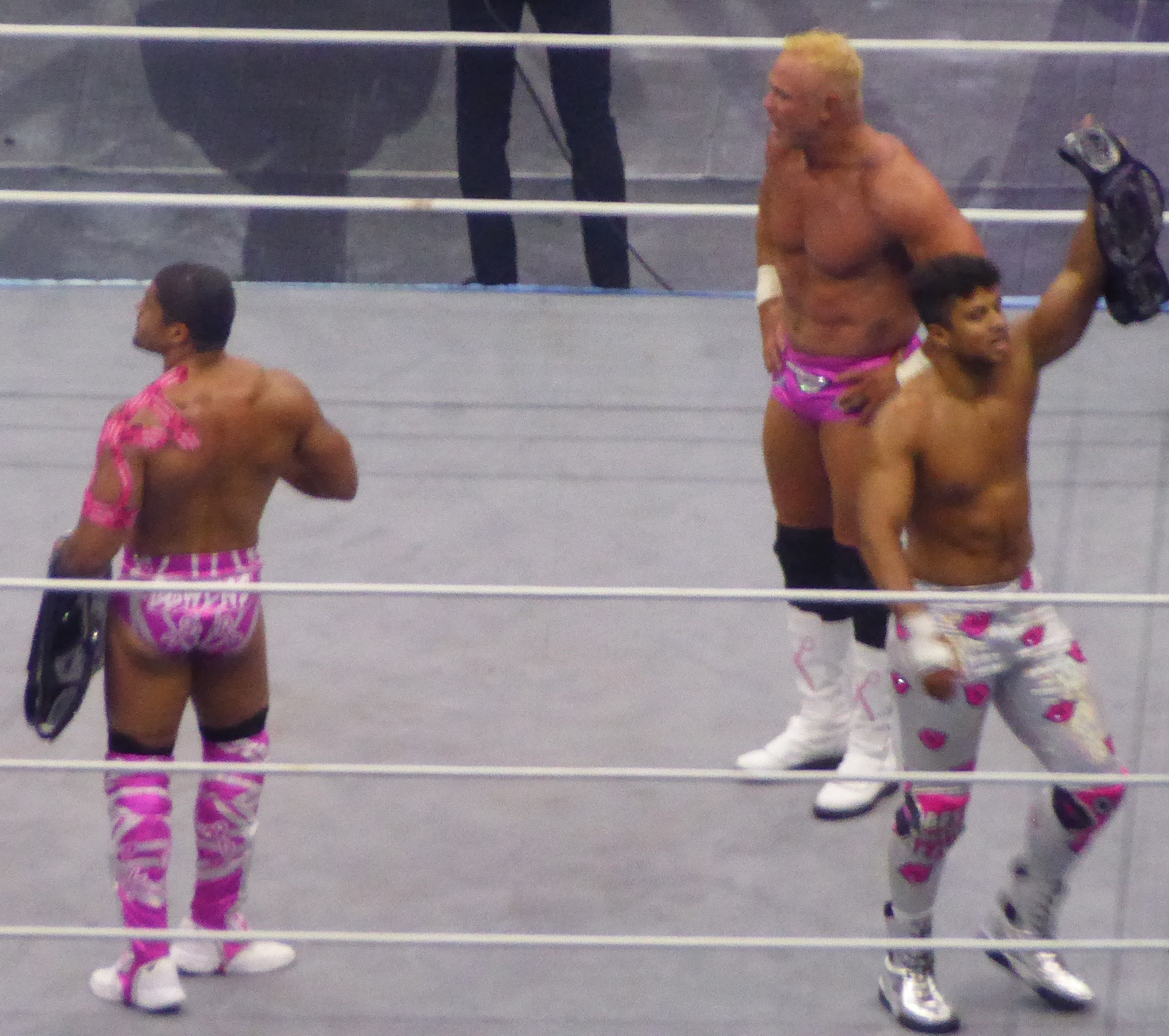
Caster (right) as AEW World Trios Champion in August 2023.

- All Elite Wrestling
  - AEW World Tag Team Championship (1 time) – with Anthony Bowens
  - AEW World Trios Championship (1 time) – with Anthony Bowens and Billy Gunn
- Create A Pro Wrestling
  - CAP Championship (2 times, inaugural)
  - CAP Tag Team Championship (1 time) – with Bobby Orlando and Bryce Donovan
  - CAP Championship Tournament (2015)
- National Wrestling League
  - NWL Heavyweight Championship (1 time)
  - NWL Vista Championship (1 time)
- New York Post
  - Male Breakout Wrestler of the Year (2022) shared with Anthony Bowens
- Pro Wrestling Illustrated
  - Ranked No. 171 of the top 500 singles wrestlers in the PWI 500 in 2022
- Wrestle Pro
  - Wrestle Pro Gold Championship (1 time)
- Wrestling Observer Newsletter
  - Most Improved (2022) with Anthony Bowens as The Acclaimed
  - Worst Feud of the Year (2025) vs. Anthony Bowens

Preceded by Swerve Strickland and Keith Lee	9th AEW World Tag Team Champion; September 21, 2022 – present With: Anthony Bowens	Succeeded by The Gunn Club (Austin Gunn and Colten Gunn)
