= Media scrum =

Improvised press conference

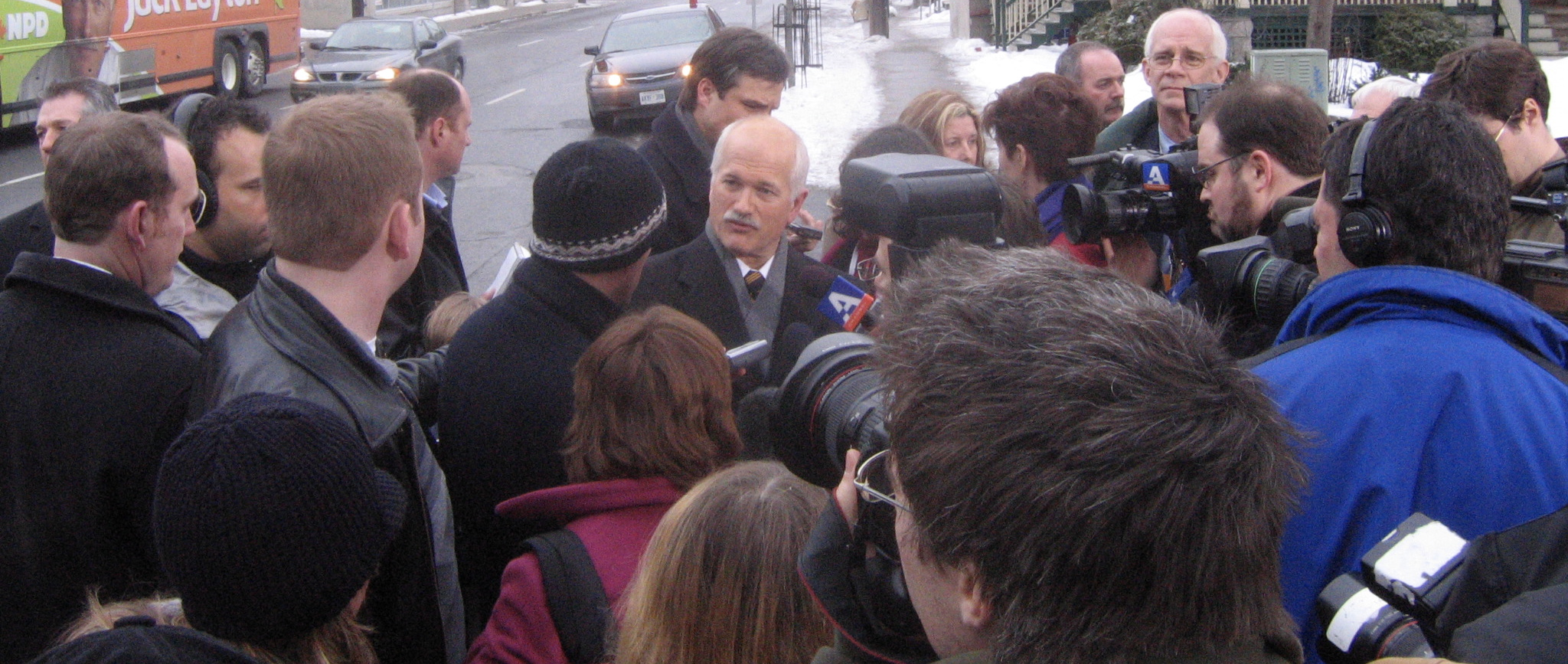
Jack Layton, previous leader of the New Democratic Party of Canada in a scrum in Ottawa in 2006.

A media scrum is an improvised press conference, often held immediately outside an event such as a legislative session or meeting. Scrums play a central role in Canadian politics and also occur in the United Kingdom, the United States, Australia and New Zealand. In New Zealand, such informal press events are also called media stand-ups or gaggles.

== Etymology ==
A scrum in rugby is a procedure to restart the game. From the outside, it may seem to involve players from both teams clustering tightly around the ball competing for possession. Analogously, in a media scrum reporters cluster around a public figure competing for his or her attention.

== Canada ==
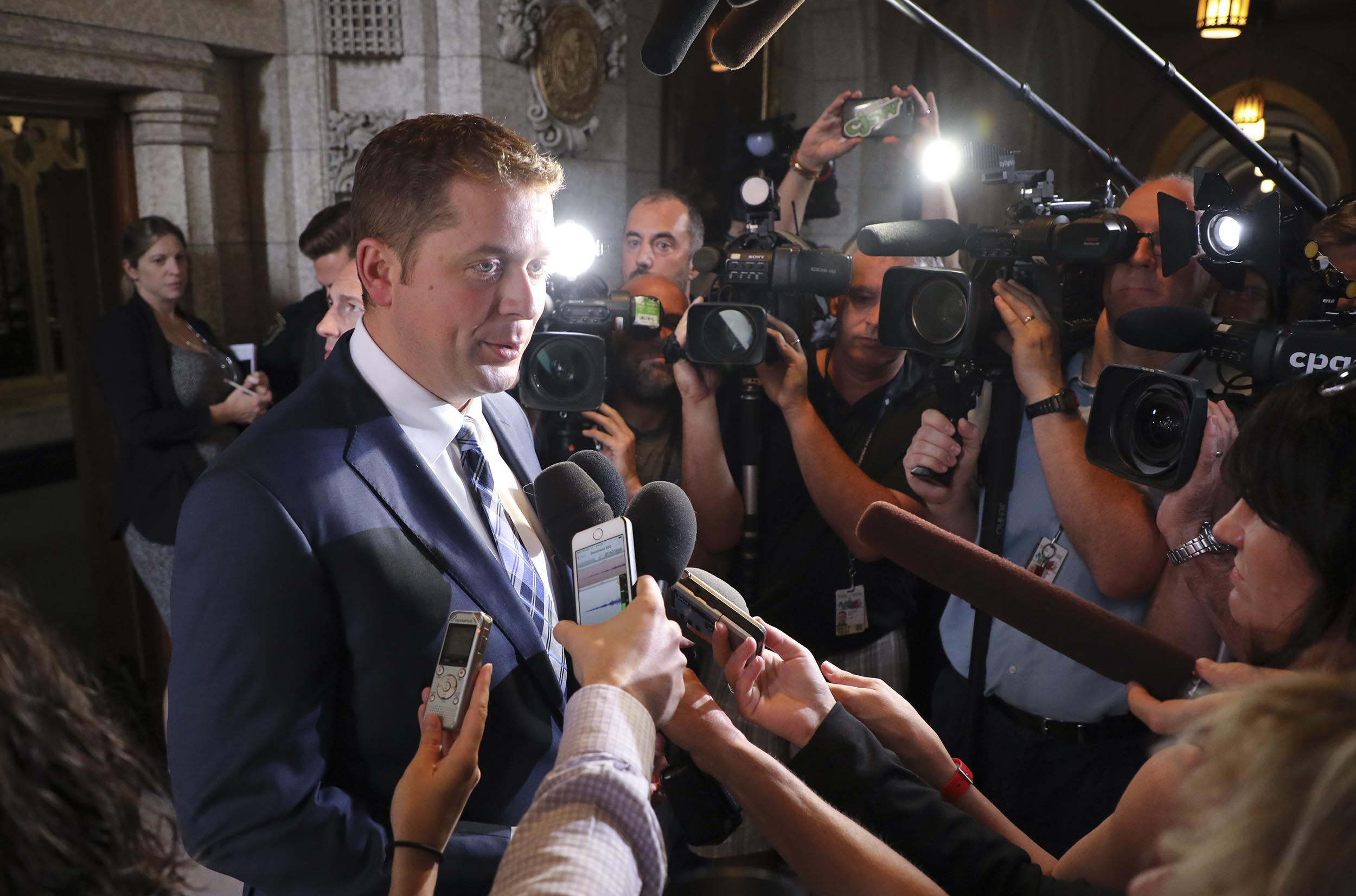
Andrew Scheer

In Canada, the scrum is a daily ritual in the hallway outside the House of Commons. Members of the Parliamentary Press Gallery surround politicians as they exit the chamber. The disorganization and pressure of the scrum makes it notorious for drawing remarks that are unplanned or controversial. Liberal MP Carolyn Parrish remarked, "damn Americans, I hate those bastards" during a scrum in the run-up to the Iraq War.

Because of these concerns, politicians have sometimes tried to avoid the scrum in favour of more formal venues. Canadian Alliance leader Stockwell Day declined to scrum, instead holding a daily press conference. Brian Mulroney restricted scrums during his time as Prime Minister of Canada by positioning himself on the stairway up to his office. This allowed him to tower over the media on the steps below him. The media so resented this practice that when Jean Chrétien held a "staircase scrum" soon after assuming office, their reaction was so negative that he promised never to do it again. By contrast, although Pierre Trudeau's relationship with the press was rocky, he was famously quick-witted and enjoyed deflecting — or returning — barbs from reporters. Many of his famous quotations, including "there's no place for the state in the bedrooms of the nation" and "just watch me", were made during scrums.
