= List of current champions in All Elite Wrestling =

All Elite Wrestling (AEW) is an American professional wrestling promotion based in Jacksonville, Florida, and is considered the second largest wrestling promotion in the world behind WWE. Title reigns are either determined by professional wrestling matches or are awarded to a wrestler as a result of the culmination of various scripted storylines.

There are currently 10 active championships in AEW, with five singles championships, one traditional tag team championship, and one six-man tag team championship for male wrestlers, and two singles championships and one tag team championship for female wrestlers. In 2022, AEW owner and president Tony Khan acquired the American promotion Ring of Honor (ROH), subsequently allowing its championships to occasionally be defended on AEW programming; its titles can be found at ROH's list.

As of November 17, 2026, 14 wrestlers hold AEW's championships. This list includes the number of times the wrestler has held the title, the date and location of the win, and a description of the winning bout.

== Overview ==
The American professional wrestling promotion All Elite Wrestling (AEW) promotes several professional wrestling championships for its men's and women's divisions. AEW often broadcasts championship matches on their weekly television programs—Wednesday Night Dynamite and Saturday Night Collision—as well as television specials. Championship defenses also occur at the promotion's periodic pay-per-view events.

In 2022, AEW owner and president Tony Khan acquired the American promotion Ring of Honor (ROH), and while it operates as a separate promotion, wrestlers from AEW often appear in ROH and vice versa, also allowing them to challenge for their respective titles; for ROH's titles, see ROH's list.

=== Men ===
==== Singles ====
At the top of AEW's championship hierarchy for male wrestlers is the AEW World Championship. It is held by first-time champion Will Ospreay, who defeated Kenny Omega at All In on August 30, 2026.

The secondary title for male wrestlers is the AEW International Championship, which can be defended in other promotions globally. It is held by record-tying two-time champion Kazuchika Okada, who defeated previous champion Kyle Fletcher and Konosuke Takeshita in a triple threat match at All In on August 30, 2026.

Three other singles titles for male wrestlers include the AEW TNT Championship, the AEW Continental Championship, and the AEW National Championship. The TNT Championship is a television championship, while the Continental Championship is defended under Continental Rules—matches have a 20-minute time limit, no one is allowed at ringside, and outside interference is strictly prohibited—and similar to the International title, the National Championship can be defended in other promotions across the United States. The TNT Championship is held by record-tying three-time champion Darby Allin, who defeated Kevin Knight in a Falls Count Anywhere match at All In on August 30, 2026. The Continental Championship is held by first-time champion Jon Moxley, who defeated Kazuchika Okada in the 2025 Continental Classic final at Worlds End on December 27, 2025. The National Championship is held by first-time champion Ilja Dragunov, who defeated Tommaso Ciampa at Full Gear on November 14, 2026.

==== Tag Team ====
The AEW World Tag Team Championship is AEW's traditional tag team title, being contested by teams of two wrestlers. It is held by record-setting four-time champions The Young Bucks (Matt Jackson and Nick Jackson), who defeated previous champions Cage and Cope (Christian Cage and Adam Copeland) and FTR (Cash Wheeler and Dax Harwood) in a three-way Ladder match at All Out on September 26, 2026.

The AEW World Trios Championship is a six-man tag team championship, contested by teams of three wrestlers, referred to as trios. It is held by Swerve Strickland and The New Level (Austin Creed and Kofi), who are in their record-tying second reign as a team, while it is the respective second reign for each individually. They defeated "Hangman" Adam Page and Brodido (Brody King and Bandido) in a Texas Death match at Full Gear on November 14, 2026.

=== Women ===
==== Singles ====
At the top of AEW's championship hierarchy for female wrestlers is the AEW Women's World Championship. It is held by first-time champion Mercedes Moné, who defeated Willow Nightingale at All In on August 30, 2026.

The secondary title for female wrestlers is the AEW TBS Championship, which is also a television championship. It is held by first-time champion Queen Aminata, who defeated Persephone at Fright Night Dynamite on October 28, 2026.

==== Tag Team ====
The women's tag team title is the AEW Women's World Tag Team Championship. It is held by Wrathlander (Harley Cameron and Kris Statlander), who are in their first reign as a team, while individually, it is Statlander's first reign and Cameron's record-setting second reign. They defeated The Brawling Birds (Jamie Hayter and Alex Windsor) at Full Gear on November 14, 2026.

==== Triple Crown and Grand Slam recognition ====
In professional wrestling, a Triple Crown is an achievement for having won three specific titles within a promotion over the course of a wrestler's career, while a Grand Slam is an achievement for having won four titles over a career, typically the same three titles of the Triple Crown plus a fourth title. AEW currently has a Triple Crown for men and women but only a Grand Slam for men as the women's division only has three titles.

A male wrestler who has won the AEW World Championship, the AEW World Tag Team Championship, and the AEW World Trios Championship is recognized to have won the men's AEW Triple Crown. A male wrestler who has won the three aforementioned titles plus the AEW International Championship, in no particular order, is recognized to have won the AEW Grand Slam. A female wrestler who has won all three of AEW's women's championships—the AEW Women's World Championship, the AEW TBS Championship, and the AEW Women's World Tag Team Championship—is recognized to have won the AEW Women's Triple Crown.

Swerve Strickland is the third and most recent winner of the men's AEW Triple Crown, completing it by winning the AEW World Trios Championship with The New Level (Austin Creed and Kofi) at All In on August 30, 2026.

Kenny Omega is the first and so far only wrestler to have achieved the AEW Grand Slam. He completed it when he won the AEW International Championship at Revolution on March 9, 2025.

Kris Statlander is the second and most recent winner of the AEW Women's Triple Crown. She completed it by winning the AEW Women's World Tag Team Championship with Harley Cameron at Full Gear on November 14, 2026.

AEW also has a different type of men's Triple Crown recognition called the American Triple Crown, also referred to as the Continental Crown. It is for simultaneously holding three specific titles from three different American promotions, consisting of the AEW Continental Championship, the ROH World Championship, and the Strong Openweight Championship of NJPW Strong, which is the American branch of partner promotion New Japan Pro-Wrestling (NJPW). The American Triple Crown Champion can defend the three titles together in each promotion as the Triple Crown, but they can also defend the titles separately; upon losing one title, it ends the Triple Crown unification. Eddie Kingston is so far the only wrestler to have achieved this recognition after simultaneously retaining both the ROH World Championship and Strong Openweight Championship and winning the inaugural AEW Continental Championship at Worlds End on December 30, 2023.

== Current champions ==
=== Men's division ===
Singles

Championship	Current champion	Reign	Date	Days	Location	Notes	Ref.
AEW World Championship	Will Ospreay	1	August 30, 2026	79	London, England	Defeated Kenny Omega at All In.	
AEW International Championship	Kazuchika Okada	2	August 30, 2026	79	London, England	Defeated previous champion Kyle Fletcher and Konosuke Takeshita in a three-way match at All In.	
AEW Continental Championship	Jon Moxley	1	December 27, 2025	325	Hoffman Estates, Illinois	Defeated Kazuchika Okada in the 2025 Continental Classic final at Worlds End.	
AEW National Championship	Ilja Dragunov	1	November 14, 2026	3	Phoenix, Arizona	Defeated Tommaso Ciampa at Full Gear.	
AEW TNT Championship	Darby Allin	3	August 30, 2026	79	London, England	Defeated Kevin Knight in a Falls Count Anywhere match at All In.	

Tag teams

Championship	Current champion	Reign	Date	Days	Location	Notes	Ref.
AEW World Tag Team Championship	The Young Bucks (Matt Jackson and Nick Jackson)	4	September 26, 2026	52	Hoffman Estates, Illinois	Defeated previous champions Cage and Cope (Christian Cage and Adam Copeland) and FTR (Dax Harwood and Cash Wheeler) in a three-way Ladder match at All Out.	
AEW World Trios Championship	Swerve Strickland and The New Level (Kofi and Austin Creed)	2	November 14, 2026	3	Phoenix, Arizona	Defeated "Hangman" Adam Page and Brodido (Brody King and Bandido) in a Texas Death match at Full Gear.	

=== Women's division ===
Singles

Championship	Current champion	Reign	Date won	Days held	Location	Notes	Ref.
AEW Women's World Championship	Mercedes Moné	1	August 30, 2026	79	London, England	Defeated Willow Nightingale at All In.	
AEW TBS Championship	Queen Aminata	1	October 28, 2026	20	St. Louis, Missouri	Defeated Persephone at Fright Night Dynamite.	

Tag Team

Championship	Current champions	Reign	Date won	Days held	Location	Notes	Ref.
AEW Women's World Tag Team Championship	Wrathlander (Harley Cameron and Kris Statlander)	1 (2, 1)	November 14, 2026	3	Phoenix, Arizona	Defeated The Brawling Birds (Jamie Hayter and Alex Windsor) at Full Gear.	

== See also ==
- List of current champions in Ring of Honor
- Grand Slam (professional wrestling)
- Triple Crown (professional wrestling)
- AEW Dynamite Diamond Ring
- FTW Championship – a championship used by AEW from 2020 to 2024

Champions in AEW lists

- List of AEW World Champions
- List of AEW Women's World Champions
- List of AEW World Tag Team Champions
- List of AEW International Champions
- List of AEW TNT Champions
