= AEW Redemption =

2026 All Elite Wrestling pay-per-view and livestreaming event

Redemption
- Promotional poster featuring Kevin Knight, Thekla, Kenny Omega, and Willow Nightingale
- Promotion: All Elite Wrestling
- Date: July 26, 2026
- City: Montreal, Quebec, Canada
- Venue: Bell Centre
- Attendance: 7,107
- Buy rate: 120,000

Pay-per-view chronology
← Previous; Forbidden Door	Next → All In

AEW in Canada chronology
← Previous; Dynasty	Next → —

Redemption was a 2026 professional wrestling pay-per-view (PPV) event produced by the American promotion All Elite Wrestling (AEW). It took place on July 26, 2026, at the Bell Centre in Montreal, Quebec, Canada, marking AEW's first PPV to be held in Montreal. It also serves as the inaugural "Redemption" event under the AEW banner.

Eleven matches were contested at the event, including one on the Zero Hour pre-show. In the main event, Kenny Omega defeated Kevin Knight to retain the AEW World Championship. In other prominent matches, Willow Nightingale defeated Thekla to win the AEW Women's World Championship, becoming the first AEW Women's Triple Crown Champion, "The Painmaker" Chris Jericho defeated Tommaso Ciampa by submission in a No Holds Barred match, and The Young Bucks (Matt Jackson and Nick Jackson) defeated Death Riders (Jon Moxley and Will Ospreay) in a tag team match.

== Production ==
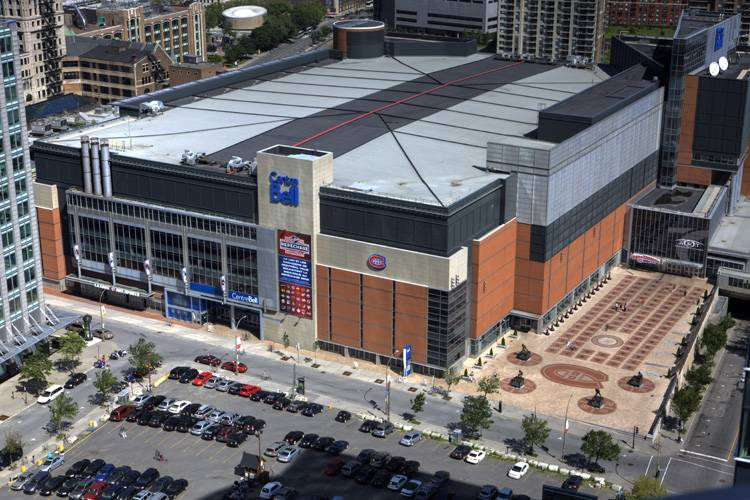
Redemption took place at the Bell Centre in Montreal, Quebec, Canada, marking All Elite Wrestling's first pay-per-view event in Montreal.

=== Background ===
On May 26, 2026, the Toronto Sun reported that American professional wrestling promotion All Elite Wrestling (AEW) would be debuting a pay-per-view (PPV) event entitled Redemption. It was scheduled to be held on July 26, 2026, at the Bell Centre in Montreal, Quebec, Canada, marking AEW's first PPV in Montreal. Tickets went on sale on June 1.

=== Broadcast outlets ===
Other on-screen personnel
Role	Name
Commentators	Excalibur (Pre-show and PPV)
Commentators	Tony Schiavone (Pre-show and PPV)
Commentators	Nigel McGuinness (Pre-show and PPV)
Commentators	Taz (PPV)
Spanish Commentators	Carlos Cabrera
Spanish Commentators	Alvaro Riojas
Spanish Commentators	Ariel Levy
Ring announcers	Justin Roberts (PPV)
Ring announcers	Arkady Aura (Pre-show and PPV)
Referees	Aubrey Edwards
Referees	Brandon Martinez
Referees	Bryce Remsburg
Referees	Mike Posey
Referees	Paul Turner
Referees	Rick Knox
Referees	Stephon Smith
Pre-show hosts	Renee Paquette
Pre-show hosts	Mick Foley
Pre-show hosts	Jeff Jarrett

Redemption aired via PPV through traditional cable and satellite providers. In the United States, AEW PPV events are available on HBO Max at an exclusive rate for subscribers. The event was also available to livestream in the United States and internationally on Prime Video, PPV.com, and YouTube. Additionally in the United States, the show was broadcast at Dave & Buster's and Tom's Watch Bar locations. Outside of the United States and Canada, the event was available to stream on MyAEW.

=== Storylines ===
Redemption featured professional wrestling matches that involved different wrestlers from pre-existing feuds and storylines. Storylines were produced on AEW's weekly television programs, Dynamite and Collision.

On July 8 during Dynamite: Beach Break, Willow Nightingale returned from a shoulder injury and won a Casino Gauntlet match to challenge AEW Women's World Champion Thekla at Redemption.

At Dynamite: Beach Break, Kenny Omega defeated MJF to win the AEW World Championship, which was Omega's last chance to capture the title if he failed to do so. On the July 15 episode of Dynamite, Kevin Knight challenged Omega for the title at Redemption, wanting to become a double champion as he already held the AEW TNT Championship.

On the July 15 episode of Dynamite, Andrade El Ídolo defeated Jake Doyle to challenge Mark Davis for the AEW National Championship at Redemption.

During the July 15 episode of Dynamite, after AEW International Champion Kyle Fletcher successfully defended his title against Komander, Fletcher attempted to unmasked his rival. This led to Konosuke Takeshita to save Komander, only to be attacked by Kazuchika Okada. This was followed up by Fletcher and Okada holding the International Championship, which concluded with Bandido taking both men down. This led Fletcher to challenge Bandido with his title on the line at Redemption.

At Dynamite: Beach Break, Tommaso Ciampa defeated Chris Jericho after blinding him with a handful of sand. Following the match, Ciampa attempted to use a power drill on a bloodied Jericho which led to security rushing to the ring to separate the two. The following week on Dynamite, Jericho returned with his "Painmaker" persona to challenge Ciampa to a rematch. Ciampa, on the following Collision, raised the stakes of the match by issuing a warning to Jericho's long time friend, Paul Wight. This concluded with Ciampa accepting the rematch challenge under No Holds Barred rules at Redemption.

== Results ==
No.	Results	Stipulations	Times
1^{P}	The Conglomeration (Orange Cassidy, Roderick Strong, and Kyle O'Reilly) (c) defeated The Lethal Twist (Jay Lethal, Blake Christian, and Lee Johnson) by pinfall	Trios match for the AEW World Trios Championship	12:00
2	Mike Bailey defeated Jack Perry, The Beast Mortos, Komander, Nick Wayne, and El Clon	Six-way Ladder match to determine the #1 contender for the AEW International Championship	19:40
3	The Young Bucks (Matt Jackson and Nick Jackson) defeated Death Riders (Jon Moxley and Will Ospreay) (with Marina Shafir) by pinfall	Tag team match	19:40
4	Kyle Fletcher (c) defeated Bandido by pinfall	Singles match for the AEW International Championship	26:20
5	The Dogs (David Finlay and Clark Connors) defeated Bang Bang Gang (Jay White and Juice Robinson) by pinfall	Double Chain tag team match	19:05
6	Maya World defeated Hikaru Shida (c) by pinfall	Singles match for the AEW TBS Championship	16:30
7	Cage and Cope (Christian Cage and Adam Copeland) (c) defeated Death Riders (Claudio Castagnoli and Pac) by pinfall	Tag team match for the AEW World Tag Team Championship	18:35
8	"The Painmaker" Chris Jericho defeated Tommaso Ciampa by submission	No Holds Barred match	23:00
9	Andrade El Ídolo defeated Mark Davis (c) by pinfall	Singles match for the AEW National Championship	16:15
10	Willow Nightingale defeated Thekla (c) by pinfall	Singles match for the AEW Women's World Championship	17:10
11	Kenny Omega (c) defeated Kevin Knight by pinfall	Singles match for the AEW World Championship	25:00
(c) / – the champion(s) heading into the match; P / – the match was broadcast on the pre-show
