= AEW National Championship =

Men's professional wrestling championship

- The AEW National Championship belt

Details
- Promotion: All Elite Wrestling
- Date established: November 5, 2025
- Current champion: Ilja Dragunov
- Date won: November 14, 2026
Statistics
- First champion: Ricochet
- Longest reign: Ricochet (113 days)
- Shortest reign: Tommaso Ciampa (7 days)
- Oldest champion: Tommaso Ciampa (41 years, 183 days)
- Youngest champion: Jack Perry (28 years, 272 days)
- Heaviest champion: Mark Davis (240 lb (110 kg))
- Lightest champion: Jack Perry (167 lb (76 kg))

The AEW National Championship is a men's professional wrestling championship created and promoted by the American promotion All Elite Wrestling (AEW). Established on November 5, 2025, the championship is not exclusive to AEW, as it can also be defended in other promotions across the United States, such as Ring of Honor and New Japan Pro-Wrestling's (NJPW) American branch, NJPW Strong. The inaugural champion was Ricochet. The current champion is Ilja Dragunov, who is in his first reign. He won the title by defeating previous champion Tommaso Ciampa at Full Gear on November 14, 2026.

== History ==
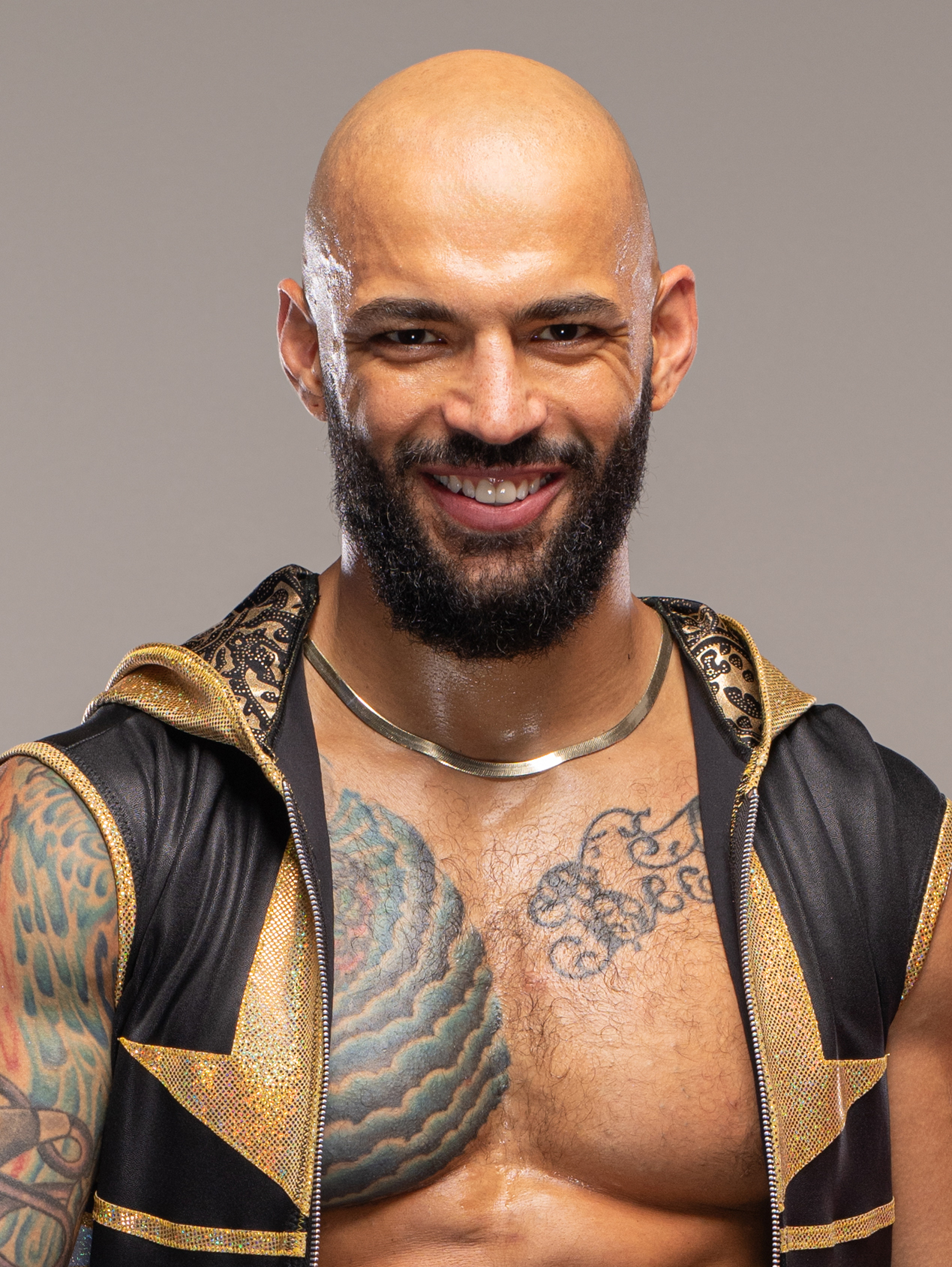
Inaugural champion Ricochet

The professional wrestling championship was established by the American promotion All Elite Wrestling (AEW) on November 5, 2025. Prior to that night's episode of AEW's weekly television program Dynamite on TBS, the company's president Tony Khan and commentator Tony Schiavone went live on X to announce the creation of the AEW National Championship. Similar to the AEW International Championship, it was revealed that it could be defended in other promotions. To determine the inaugural AEW National Champion, a Casino Gauntlet match was scheduled for AEW's Full Gear pay-per-view event on November 22, 2025. The 12-man match was won by Ricochet, who pinned Kevin Knight to win.

The championship was inspired by the NWA National Heavyweight Championship, which originally served as the top title of Georgia Championship Wrestling under the National Wrestling Alliance (NWA). The NWA National Heavyweight Championship last appeared on TBS in 1986, when it was unified with the Mid-Atlantic version of the NWA United States Heavyweight Championship—that title subsequently became a World Championship Wrestling title in 1991 before being acquired by WWE in 2001 and becoming the WWE United States Championship in 2003. Wahoo McDaniel was recognized as the final NWA National Heavyweight Champion until the title was reactivated in 1997.

On March 15, 2026, Jack Perry won a 21-man Blackjack Battle Royal by last eliminating Ricochet. The match began during the Revolution Zero Hour pre-show but concluded after the start of the pay-per-view. After three successful title defenses by Perry, he was defeated by Mark Davis at Collision: Fairway to Hell on May 9.

Following Andrade El Idolo's exit from the Don Callis Family at Forbidden Door, he defeated Davis at Redemption to capture his first AEW championship on July 26. Tommaso Ciampa defeated Andrade at Collision: Rock 'N' Wrestling Rager on November 7 to become the fifth AEW National Champion.

== Belt design ==
The AEW National Championship belt has a nearly identical design to the 1984–2013 version of the NWA National Heavyweight Championship belt. On the center plate, like with the old NWA belt, there is an eagle at the top, an outline of the United States at the bottom (including Alaska and Hawaii), two lions facing inwards on the sides, a blue globe at the center between the first and second banners, and filigree in the space on the bottom left and right of the center plate.

The notable differences with AEW's belt is that above the eagle has AEW's logo on a red background and the three banners, which are also red, say "National", "Wrestling", "Champion" in gold, respectively (with three gold stars on either side of the word "Wrestling"), instead of the second banner saying "Heavyweight Wrestling" like on the NWA's older belt. Additionally, the two inner side plates have AEW's logo on a red background with a gold star in each corner of the plate, instead of showing wrestlers grappling. The two outer side plates are identical to the NWA's old design with a wrestler holding up a title belt with an outline of the contingent United States behind them.

== Reception ==
The championship's unveiling drew criticism from figures associated with the NWA, including then-NWA National Heavyweight Champion Mike Mondo and the title's inaugural holder, Austin Idol. The dispute centered on AEW's promotional claim that the National Championship had been defunct since 1986, which omitted the NWA's reintroduction of the title in 1997. Critics also questioned AEW's assertion that its title would continue the NWA championship's legacy despite a lack of formal affiliation between the two promotions. In response, AEW President Tony Khan consulted with NWA President Billy Corgan. While Khan did not retract the initial promotional statements, he officially acknowledged the existence of the NWA's championship and clarified that AEW's would be a separate lineage. Khan also publicly commended Corgan's efforts in maintaining NWA traditions.

== Reigns ==
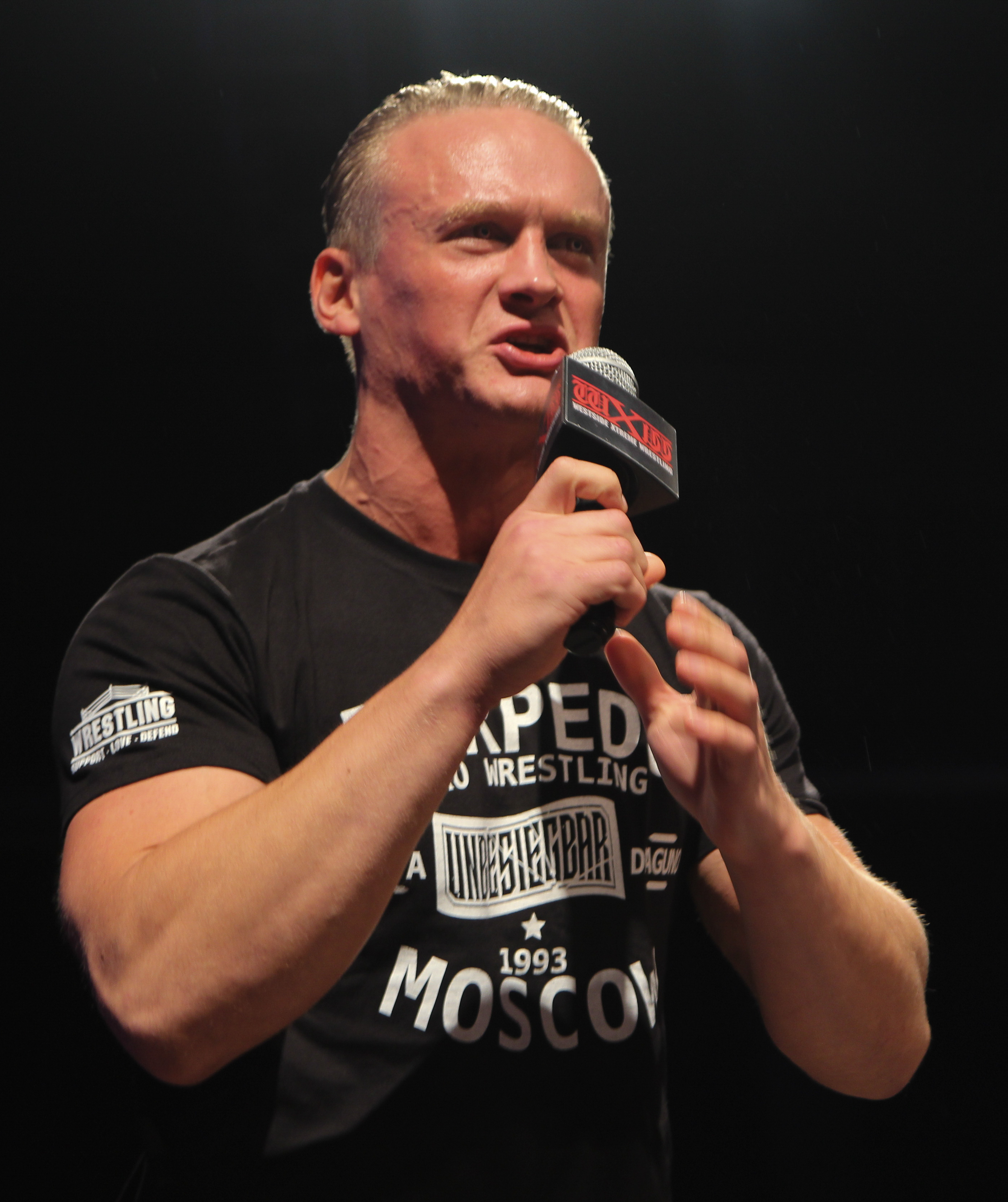
Current champion Ilja Dragunov

As of November 17, 2026, there have been six reigns between six champions. Ricochet was the inaugural champion, who has the longest reign at 113 days. Tommaso Ciampa has the shortest reign at 7 days. Ciampa is also the oldest champion at 41 years old, while Jack Perry is the youngest at 28.

The current champion is Ilja Dragunov, who is in his first reign. He won the title by defeating previous champion Tommaso Ciampa at Full Gear in Phoenix, Arizona on November 14, 2026.

Key
| No. | Overall reign number |
| Reign | Reign number for the specific champion |
| Days | Number of days held |
| + | Current reign is changing daily |

| No. | Champion | Championship change | | | Reign statistics | | Notes | Ref. |
| No. | Champion | Date | Event | Location | Reign | Days | Notes | Ref. |
|---|---|---|---|---|---|---|---|---|
| 1 | Ricochet | November 22, 2025 | Full Gear | Newark, NJ | 1 | 113 | Pinned Kevin Knight to win a 12-man Casino Gauntlet match to become the inaugural champion. | |
| 2 | Jack Perry | March 15, 2026 | Revolution | Los Angeles, CA | 1 | 55 | This was a 21-man Blackjack Battle Royal that Perry won by last eliminating Ricochet. The match began during the Zero Hour pre-show but concluded after the start of the pay-per-view. | |
| 3 | Mark Davis | May 9, 2026 | Collision: Fairway to Hell | Palm Beach Gardens, FL | 1 | 78 | | |
| 4 | Andrade El Ídolo | July 26, 2026 | Redemption | Montreal, QC, Canada | 1 | 104 | | |
| 5 | Tommaso Ciampa | November 7, 2026 | Collision: Chris Jericho's Rock 'N' Wrestling Rager at Sea – Seventh Cruise of a Seventh Cruise | Miami, FL | 1 | 7 | | |
| 6 | Ilja Dragunov | November 14, 2026 | Full Gear | Phoenix, AZ | 1 | 3+ | | |

== See also ==
- List of current champions in All Elite Wrestling
