= Full Gear (2026) =

All Elite Wrestling pay-per-view event

- Promotional poster featuring various AEW wrestlers
- Promotion: All Elite Wrestling
- Date: November 14, 2026
- City: Phoenix, Arizona
- Venue: Mortgage Matchup Center
- Attendance: 7,274

Pay-per-view chronology
| ← Previous; WrestleDream | Next → Worlds End |

Full Gear chronology
| ← Previous; 2025 | Next → — |

The 2026 Full Gear was a professional wrestling pay-per-view (PPV) event produced by All Elite Wrestling (AEW). It was the eighth annual Full Gear and took place on November 14, 2026, at Mortgage Matchup Center in Phoenix, Arizona. This was the second AEW PPV to take place in Arizona; the first, the 2025 Double or Nothing, took place at Desert Diamond Arena in the nearby suburb of Glendale.

Twelve matches were contested at the event, including four on the "Tailgate Brawl" pre-show on TNT. In the main event, Will Ospreay defeated Kyle Fletcher to retain the AEW World Championship. In other prominent matches, Swerve Strickland and The New Level defeated "Hangman" Adam Page and Brodido in a Texas Deathmatch to win the AEW World Trios Championship, The Cut defeated the Death Riders in an Anarchy in the Arena match, Mercedes Moné defeated Marina Shafir to retain the AEW Women's World Championship, and Ilja Dragunov defeated Tommaso Ciampa to win the AEW National Championship. The event also featured the return of MJF and the debut of Kasper Brothers (Jacob Kasper and Drew Kasper).

== Production ==
=== Background ===
Full Gear is a professional wrestling pay-per-view (PPV) event held annually in November by All Elite Wrestling (AEW) since 2019. It is considered one of AEW's "Big Five", alongside Revolution, Double or Nothing, All In, and All Out; the promotion's five biggest events held annually. On July 13, 2026, AEW announced that the eighth annual Full Gear would take place on Saturday, November 14 at Mortgage Matchup Center in Phoenix, Arizona. Tickets for Full Gear went on sale on July 27.

=== Storylines ===
Other on-screen personnel
| Role | Name |
|---|---|
| Commentators | Excalibur (Pre-show and PPV) |
| Commentators | Tony Schiavone (Pre-show and PPV) |
| Commentators | Nigel McGuinness (PPV) |
| Commentators | Walker Stewart (Pre-show) |
| Commentators | Dr. Britt Baker, D.M.D. (AEW TBS Championship match) |
| Commentators | Don Callis (AEW World Tag Team, AEW World Championship matches) |
| Spanish Commentators | Ariel Levy |
| Spanish Commentators | Jon Cruz |
| Ring announcers | Justin Roberts (PPV) |
| Ring announcers | Arkady Aura (Pre-show and PPV) |
| Referees | Aubrey Edwards |
| Referees | Brandon Martinez |
| Referees | Bryce Remsburg |
| Referees | Mike Posey |
| Referees | Paul Turner |
| Referees | Rick Knox |
| Referees | Stephon Smith |
| Pre-show hosts | RJ City |
| Pre-show hosts | Mick Foley |
| Pre-show hosts | Lexy Nair |

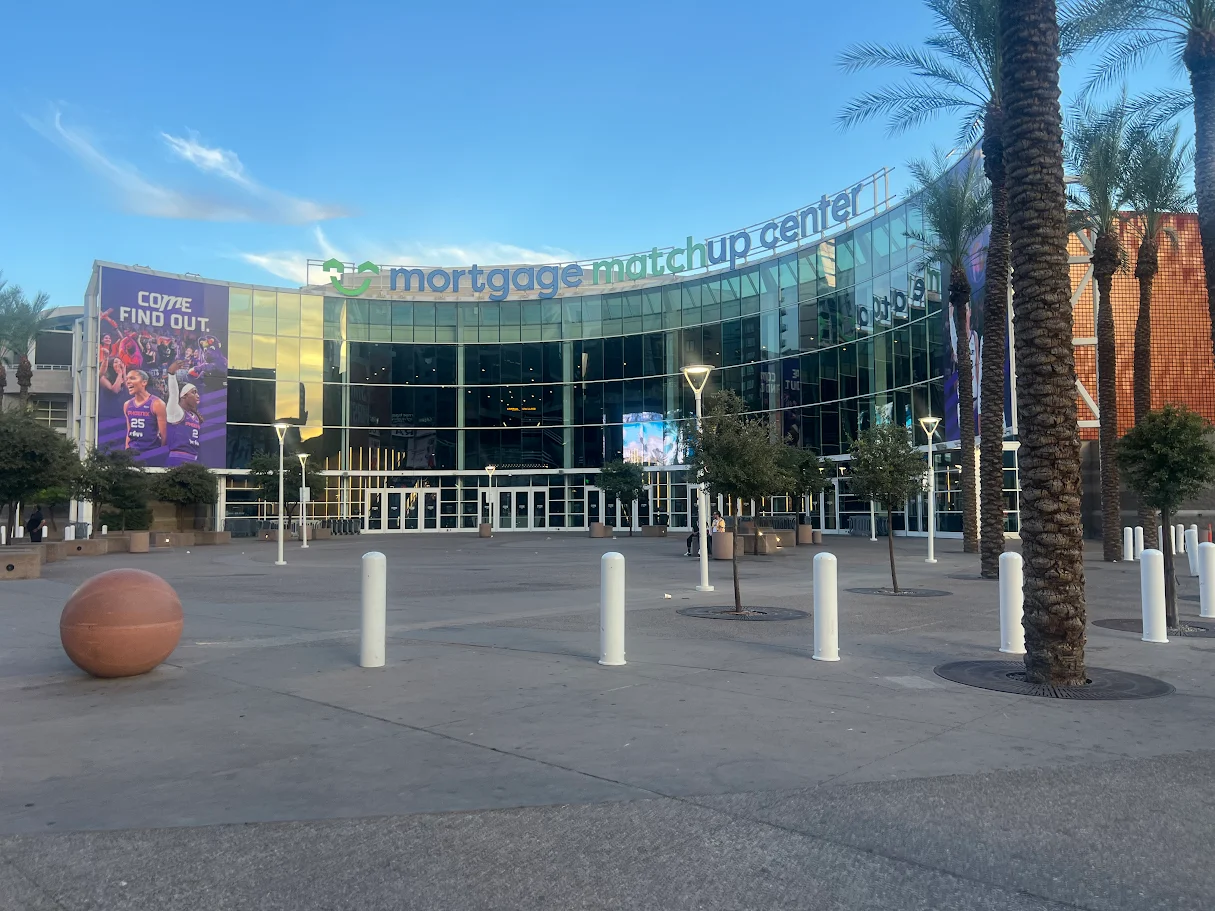
The event was held at Mortgage Matchup Center in Phoenix, Arizona.

Full Gear featured professional wrestling matches that different wrestlers from pre-existing feuds and storylines. Storylines are produced on AEW's weekly television programs, Dynamite and Collision.

On the Grand Slam France episode of Collision, Wrathlander (Harley Cameron and Kris Statlander) won a three-way tag team match to earn an opportunity for the AEW Women's World Tag Team Championship, held by The Brawling Birds (Jamie Hayter and Alex Windsor). The match was originally set for WrestleDream, but Hayter's injuries suffered at the previous month's All Out postponed it. On the October 21 episode of Dynamite, AEW announced that the match would now take place at Full Gear. At Blood & Guts two weeks later, Wrathlander and The Brawling Birds would compete in the eponymous match, teaming with Willow Nightingale and AEW TBS Champion Queen Aminata to defeat Persephone, Divine Dominion (Megan Bayne and Lena Kross), and The Triangle of Madness (Thekla, Julia Hart, and Skye Blue). However, there was notable tension between the two teams by the end of the match.

On the October 21 episode of Dynamite, Davis and Doyle (Mark Davis and Jake Doyle) of the Don Callis Family defeated The Young Bucks (Matt Jackson and Nick Jackson) in an AEW World Tag Team Championship eliminator match in under three minutes. As a result, they earned a title opportunity, later confirmed for Full Gear. Two weeks later at Blood & Guts, the Don Callis Family (Davis, Doyle, Kyle Fletcher, Kevin Knight, Wardlow, and AEW International Champion Kazuchika Okada) would defeat The Young Bucks, Adam Copeland, Steven Borden, AEW TNT Champion Darby Allin, and AEW World Champion Will Ospreay in the titular match.

On the October 21 Dynamite, Kyle Fletcher and Kevin Knight of The Don Callis Family defeated AEW World Champion Will Ospreay and Adam Copeland; during the closing moments, fellow Don Callis Family member Kazuchika Okada made Copeland fall onto his AEW International Championship belt, allowing Fletcher to score the pin. After the match, they and the rest of the Don Callis Family laid out Copeland and Ospreay, with Callis presenting Fletcher with the AEW World Championship before hitting Ospreay with it. The following week on Fright Night Dynamite, after defeating Jack Perry, Fletcher reminded everyone that two years ago, he defeated Ospreay at Full Gear. Determined to do it again, he challenged Ospreay to an AEW World Championship match at this year's Full Gear. AEW confirmed the match later that night. At Blood & Guts, the Don Callis Family defeated Ospreay's team; Okada restrained Copeland with a chain around his neck as Fletcher threatened to stab Ospreay with a screwdriver unless Copeland surrendered, which he did. Three days later on Collision, held on Chris Jericho's Rock 'N' Wrestling Rager at Sea, AEW announced that Okada would defend the AEW International Championship against Copeland at Full Gear. On the November 11 combined edition of Dynamite and Collision, Ospreay and Fletcher had a live promo in the ring. While Fletcher admitted his success was in part because of Ospreay, he turned that around, accused him of being a "manipulator," and took credit for breaking Ospreay's neck when he betrayed him two years ago. Ospreay later claimed he was proud of Fletcher's growth but noted that of the six singles matches they had together, Ospreay had won five, two of which were after Fletcher's betrayal and before Ospreay had surgery. Fletcher later admitted he was jealous that Ospreay won the AEW World Championship at All In but now believed he was meant to take it away from him. Ospreay, for his part, said he still loved Fletcher, but that ultimately, he and Fletcher were on different skill levels.

On the October 21 Dynamite, AEW Women's World Champion Mercedes Moné called out for a new challenger before being confronted by Marina Shafir, who told Moné, "Don't be a pussy." The following week on Fright Night Dynamite, Shafir called out Moné following her victory. Moné called Shafir's bluff, thinking she was a worthy challenger just because she was dangerous, but was sent running after dodging a kick from Shafir. At Blood & Guts, Moné said that Shafir only got attention by joining the Death Riders; Shafir responded, saying that Moné believed herself to be dangerous just because she was the biggest star in AEW. The segment ended with Moné standing tall after locking Shafir in the Statement Maker. The following week, the Death Riders (Shafir and AEW Continental Champion Jon Moxley) defeated Moné and Jay White in a mixed tag team match, with Shafir making Moné tap out in the Brutalizer.

At All In, "Hangman" Adam Page and Brodido (Brody King and Bandido) defended the AEW World Trios Championship in a Trios Roulette Royale, which was won by Swerve Strickland and The New Level (Austin Creed and Kofi). After losing a rematch at All Out, Page and Brodido would regain the titles in a two out of three falls match at WrestleDream. On the subsequent episode of Dynamite, Strickland challenged Page to one more match at Full Gear, but this time as a Texas Deathmatch. Page accepted the match but refused the stipulation, remembering the Texas Deathmatch he and Strickland had at three years ago and not wanting their partners to get involved in their personal business. The following week on Fright Night Dynamite, King confronted The New Level, suspecting their involvement in Bandido's disappearance. As Page tried to calm him down, the screen showed Strickland in a dark location, standing over a bloodied and unmasked Bandido. The week after, when Creed questioned Strickland's actions, Bandido attacked Strickland and the New Level. After being separated, Bandido demanded Page accept the Texas Deathmatch, and with King's confirmation, Page reluctantly agreed. On the November 11 combined Dynamite/Collision, Brodido and the New Level wrestled to a double countout, but continued brawling on the entrance ramp before being separated by security.

On the October 21 Dynamite, AEW Continental Champion Jon Moxley defeated Roderick Strong in an eliminator match. After the match, The Dogs (David Finlay and Clark Connors) attacked Strong but were held back by Moxley, who then started attacking him. Gabe Kidd, a member of both the Dogs and Death Riders, confronted them only to also fall victim to their attack. This brought out Jay White and The Conglomeration (Orange Cassidy and Kyle O'Reilly) to protect Strong, only for White to turn on Cassidy, prompting the Dogs and the Bang Bang Gang (Juice Robinson, Ace Austin, Austin Gunn, and Colten Gunn) to attack Kidd, the Conglomeration, and the Death Riders (Claudio Castagnoli, Wheeler Yuta, and Daniel Garcia). Three days later on Collision, White announced the Bang Bang Gang and the Dogs are now one united group, initially calling themselves "The Last Outfit" before officially being dubbed The Cut. White would defeat O'Reilly later that night. On Fright Night Dynamite, after White and Finlay defeated Moxley and Garcia, a massive brawl broke out between the Cut and the Death Riders, ending with Moxley challenging the Cut to an Anarchy in the Arena match at Full Gear. However, during the attack, White dropped Castagnoli with a Blade Runner on the exposed concrete floor, rendering him unable to compete. On Collision, Robinson and the Gunns defeated the Conglomeration due to interference by the rest of the Cut, who continued to attack after the match. At Blood & Guts, Moxley met with the Conglomeration, asking for their help against the Cut at Full Gear before slipping a fork to Cassidy. On Chris Jericho's Rock 'N' Wrestling Rager at Sea, after the Cut and Mercedes Moné attacked the Death Riders, it was revealed later that night that Robinson had been hospitalized following a bloody assault, with a fork left behind at the scene. Moxley and Marina Shafir would defeat White and Moné at the following combined episode of Dynamite and Collision.

At Fright Night Dynamite, Tommaso Ciampa called himself "the best signing in AEW history," before being confronted by recent signee Ilja Dragunov. He tried to goad Ciampa into a fight to prove his point, but Ciampa decided against it. Two weeks later on Collision on the Jericho Cruise, Ciampa defeated Andrade El Ídolo to win the AEW National Championship. On the following combined Dynamite/Collision episode, Ciampa defended the title against "Speedball" Mike Bailey before being confronted by Dragunov again, revealing that he will challenge Ciampa for the title at Full Gear.

On the All In Zero Hour pre-show, Persephone won the AEW TBS Championship from Maya World thanks to a returning Dr. Britt Baker, D.M.D.. Nearly two months later on the October 21 Dynamite, World lost a number one contender's match to Queen Aminata, suffering an injury in the process. Aminata would defeat Persephone to win the title the following week at Fright Night Dynamite. The two women would later compete in the Blood & Guts match the week after, with Aminata's team defeating Persephone's. On the November 11 combined Dynamite/Collision, after Aminata defended the AEW TBS Championship against Skye Blue and World's tag team partner Hyan, it was announced that she would defend the title against both Persephone and World on the Saturday Tailgate Brawl pre-show for Full Gear.

== Results ==
| No. | Results | Stipulations | Times |
|---|---|---|---|
| 1^{P} | Jack Perry defeated The Beast Mortos by pinfall | Singles match | 9:25 |
| 2^{P} | The Don Callis Family (El Clon, Kevin Knight, and Wardlow) (with Josh Alexander, Lance Archer, Rocky Romero, and Trent Beretta) defeated Jaden Monroe, Jordan Cruz, and RJ Wylde by pinfall | Trios match | 2:05 |
| 3^{P} | Boom & Doom ("Big Boom!" A.J. and Q. T. Marshall) and SkyFlight (Darius Martin and Matt Sydal) (with Christopher Daniels) defeated The Don Callis Family (Josh Alexander, Lance Archer, Rocky Romero, and Trent Beretta) by pinfall | Eight-man tag team match | 10:00 |
| 4^{P} | Queen Aminata (c) defeated Skye Blue, Persephone (with Dr. Britt Baker, D.M.D.), and Hyan by pinfall | Four-way match (Note: Maya World could not appear due to travel issues and was replaced by Blue and Hyan) for the AEW TBS Championship | 10:55 |
| 5 | Kazuchika Okada (c) (with Don Callis) defeated Adam Copeland by pinfall | Singles match for the AEW International Championship | 18:50 |
| 6 | The Young Bucks (Matt Jackson and Nick Jackson) (c) defeated Davis and Doyle (Mark Davis and Jake Doyle) (with Don Callis) by pinfall | Tag team match for the AEW World Tag Team Championship | 20:45 |
| 7 | Swerve Strickland and The New Level (Austin Creed and Kofi) (with Prince Nana) defeated "Hangman" Adam Page and Brodido (Brody King and Bandido) (c) by knockout | Texas Deathmatch for the AEW World Trios Championship | 39:20 |
| 8 | Wrathlander (Harley Cameron and Kris Statlander) defeated The Brawling Birds (Jamie Hayter and Alex Windsor) (c) by pinfall | Tag team match for the AEW Women's World Tag Team Championship | 12:15 |
| 9 | Ilja Dragunov defeated Tommaso Ciampa (c) by pinfall | Singles match for the AEW National Championship | 21:00 |
| 10 | Mercedes Moné (c) defeated Marina Shafir by pinfall | Singles match for the AEW Women's World Championship | 17:15 |
| 11 | The Cut (Jay White, Ace Austin, Austin Gunn, Clark Connors, Colten Gunn, and David Finlay) defeated Death Riders (Jon Moxley, Daniel Garcia, and Gabe Kidd) and The Conglomeration (Orange Cassidy, Kyle O'Reilly, and Roderick Strong) by pinfall | Anarchy in the Arena match | 35:50 |
| 12 | Will Ospreay (c) (with Andrade El Ídolo, Mike Bailey, Alex Windsor, and Jamie Hayter) defeated Kyle Fletcher (with Don Callis, Jake Doyle, Kevin Knight, and Mark Davis) by pinfall | Singles match for the AEW World Championship | 40:15 |
(c) / – the champion(s) heading into the match; P / – the match was broadcast on the pre-show
