= List of current champions in Ring of Honor =

Ring of Honor (ROH) is an American professional wrestling promotion based in Jacksonville, Florida. Title reigns are either determined by professional wrestling matches or are awarded to a wrestler as a result of the culmination of various scripted storylines.

There are currently eight championships in ROH. Both the men's and women's divisions have three singles championships, encompassing a primary, secondary, and specialty title, while the men additionally have one traditional tag team championship and one six-man tag team championship.

As of November 22, 2026, 11 wrestlers officially hold championships. This list includes the number of times the wrestler has held the title, the date and location of the win, and a description of the winning bout.

== Overview ==
The American professional wrestling promotion Ring of Honor (ROH) promotes several professional wrestling championships for its men's and women's divisions. ROH often broadcasts championship matches on their weekly streaming television program, Honor Club, while also regularly being featured on programs of sister promotion All Elite Wrestling (AEW). Major championship defenses also occur at ROH's and AEW's periodic pay-per-view events.

=== Men ===
At the top of ROH's championship hierarchy for male wrestlers is the ROH World Championship. It is held by two-time champion Bandido, who defeated Chris Jericho in a Title vs. Mask match at AEW Dynasty on April 6, 2025.

The secondary title for male wrestlers is the ROH World Television Championship. It is held by first-time champion Action Andretti, who defeated Lio Rush at Death Before Dishonor on August 21, 2026.

The ROH Pure Championship is a specialty championship in which matches are conducted under "Pure Wrestling Rules". It is held by first-time champion Lee Moriarty, who defeated Wheeler Yuta at Death Before Dishonor on July 26, 2024.

The ROH World Tag Team Championship is ROH's traditional tag team title, being contested by teams of two wrestlers. The current champions are El Sky Team (Máscara Dorada and Místico), who are in their first reign as both a team and individually. They won the title by defeating La Facción Ingobernable (Sammy Guevara and The Beast Mortos) at CMLL Super Viernes on June 26, 2026.

The ROH World Six-Man Tag Team Championship is a tag team title contested by teams of three wrestlers, also referred to as trios. The current champions are first time title holders The Lethal Twist (Jay Lethal, Blake Christian, and Lee Johnson), who defeated Dalton Castle and The Outrunners (Truth Magnum and Turbo Floyd) at Death Before Dishonor on August 21, 2026.

=== Women ===
The primary title of the women's division is the ROH Women's World Championship. It is held by first-time champion Athena. She defeated Mercedes Martinez at Final Battle on December 10, 2022.

The secondary title for the women's division is the ROH Women's World Television Championship. It is currently vacant due to previous champion Red Velvet suffering a neck injury and being stripped of the title.

The ROH Women's Pure Championship is a specialty championship in which matches are conducted under "Pure Wrestling Rules". It is held by Deonna Purrazzo, who defeated Billie Starkz in a tournament final to become the inaugural champion at Final Battle on December 5, 2025.

== Current champions ==
As of November 22, 2026.

=== Men's division ===
Singles

Championship	Current champion(s)	Reign	Date won	Days held	Location	Notes	Ref.
ROH World Championship	Bandido	2	April 6, 2025	595	Philadelphia, Pennsylvania	Defeated Chris Jericho in a Title vs. Mask match at AEW Dynasty.	
ROH World Television Championship	Action Andretti	1	August 21, 2026	93	Philadelphia, Pennsylvania	Defeated Lio Rush in a Fight Without Honor at Death Before Dishonor.	
ROH Pure Championship	Lee Moriarty	1	July 26, 2024	849	Arlington, Texas	Defeated Wheeler Yuta at Death Before Dishonor.	

Tag Team

Championship	Current champion(s)	Reign	Date won	Days held	Location	Notes	Ref.
ROH World Tag Team Championship	El Sky Team (Místico and Máscara Dorada)	1	June 26, 2026	149	Mexico City, Mexico	Defeated La Facción Ingobernable (Sammy Guevara and The Beast Mortos) at CMLL Super Viernes.	
ROH World Six-Man Tag Team Championship	The Lethal Twist (Jay Lethal, Blake Christian, and Lee Johnson)	1	August 21, 2026	93	Philadelphia, Pennsylvania	Defeated Dalton Castle and The Outrunners (Truth Magnum and Turbo Floyd) at Death Before Dishonor.	

=== Women's division ===
Championship	Current champion(s)	Reign	Date won	Days held	Location	Notes	Ref.
ROH Women's World Championship	Athena	1	December 10, 2022	1,443	Arlington, Texas	Defeated Mercedes Martinez at Final Battle.	
ROH Women's World Television Championship	Vacant		—	—	—	Title vacated due to previous champion Red Velvet suffering a neck injury and being stripped of the title.	
ROH Women's Pure Championship	Deonna Purrazzo	1	December 5, 2025	352	Columbus, Ohio	Defeated Billie Starkz in a tournament final to become the inaugural champion at Final Battle.	

== See also ==
- List of current champions in All Elite Wrestling
- List of former championships in Ring of Honor
- List of Ring of Honor personnel
- Women of Honor
- List of former Ring of Honor personnel
