= Ilja Dragunov =

Russian-German professional wrestler (born 1993)

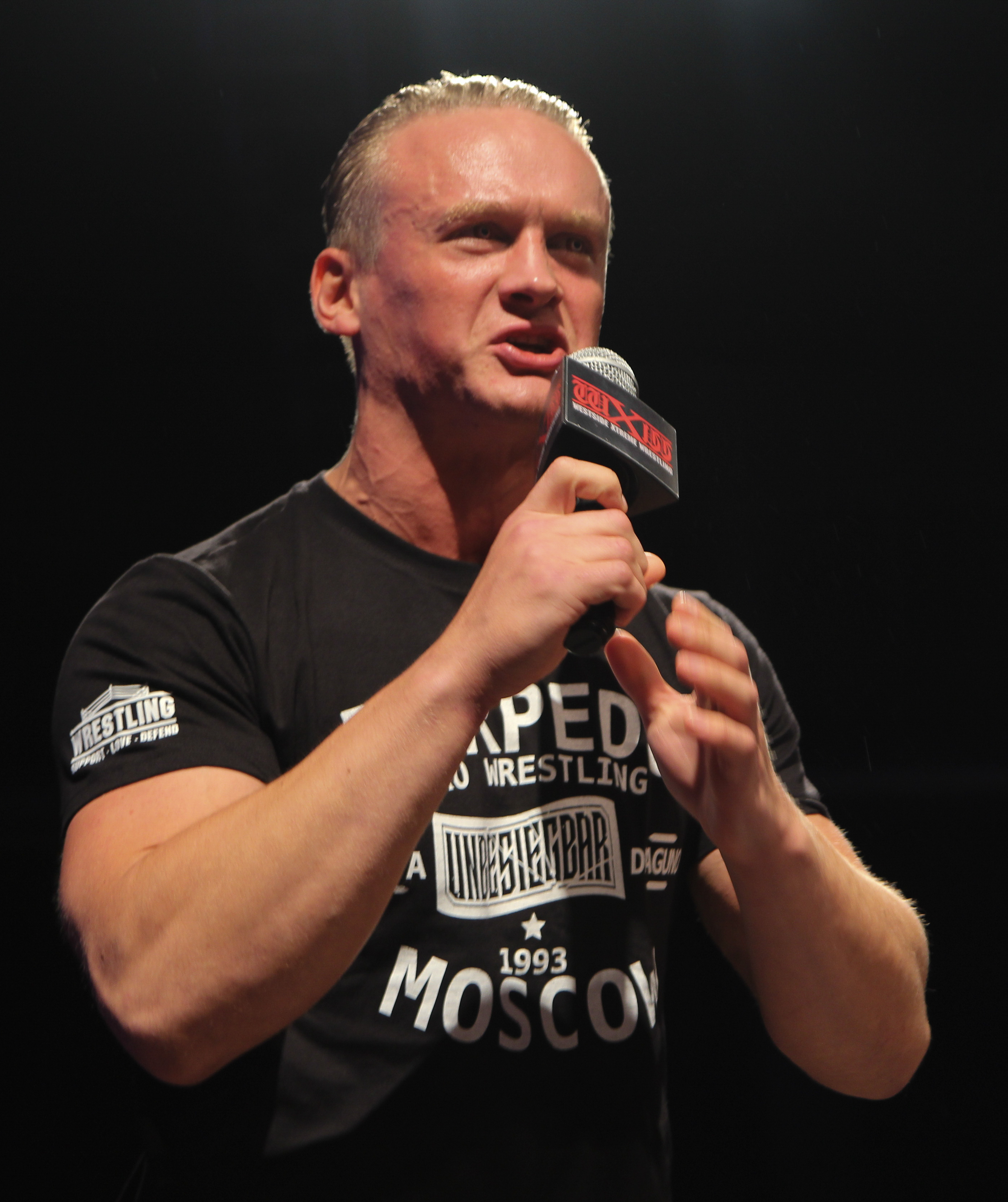
- Dragunov in 2019

Personal information
- Citizenship: Russia; Germany
- Born: Ilja Rukober; 10 October 1993 (age 33) Moscow, Russia
- Children: 1

Professional wrestling career
- Ring name: Ilja Dragunov
- Billed height: 5 ft 10 in (178 cm)
- Billed weight: 210 lb (95 kg)
- Billed from: The Soviet Union; Moscow, Russia; Dresden, Germany; Born in Russia, Raised in Germany
- Trained by: Axel Tischer; GWF Training School; Rick Baxxter; WWE Performance Center
- Debut: 21 April 2012

Ilja Rukober (Russian: Илья́ Руко́бер, romanized: Ilʹya Rukober; born 10 October 1993), better known by his ring name Ilja Dragunov (Илья Драгунов, Ilʹya Dragunov), is a Russian-German professional wrestler. As of October 2026, he is signed to All Elite Wrestling (AEW), where he is the current AEW National Champion in his first reign.

Rukober began his career in 2012 on the European independent circuit under the name Ilja Dragunov. He spent seven years with Westside Xtreme Wrestling (wXw), where he was a former Unified World Wrestling Champion, three-time wXw World Tag Team Champion and two-time wXw Shotgun Champion. He signed with WWE in 2019 and was assigned to the NXT UK and NXT brands, where he became NXT Champion and NXT United Kingdom Champion, the second of which made him the first non-kayfabe Russian-born male wrestler to win a championship in WWE. He was called up to the main roster in 2024, where he became WWE United States Champion. He left the company in 2026 and signed with AEW that same year.

Throughout his career, Dragunov has had an ongoing rivalry with fellow wrestler Walter/Gunther, with the pair fighting often in matches in several promotions, starting in wXw, and continuing through to when the pair were both signed to WWE NXT UK in 2019.

== Early life ==
Ilja Rukober was born in Moscow, Russia, and migrated to Dresden, Germany with his mother when he was five years old. During this move, neither he nor his mother could speak the German language. He is a naturalized German citizen. Prior to entering wrestling, Rukober worked various jobs from a young age to help provide for his family, including working at a pizza parlor and a gas station.

== Professional wrestling career ==
=== Early career (2012–2013) ===
Rukober started his professional wrestling training at the German Wrestling Federation (GWF) training school under veterans Axel Tischer (who wrestled for WWE under the ring name Alexander Wolfe) and Rick Baxxter. He made his in-ring debut in 2012 as Ilja Dragunov and was a regular on the European independent scene.

=== Westside Xtreme Wrestling (2013–2020) ===
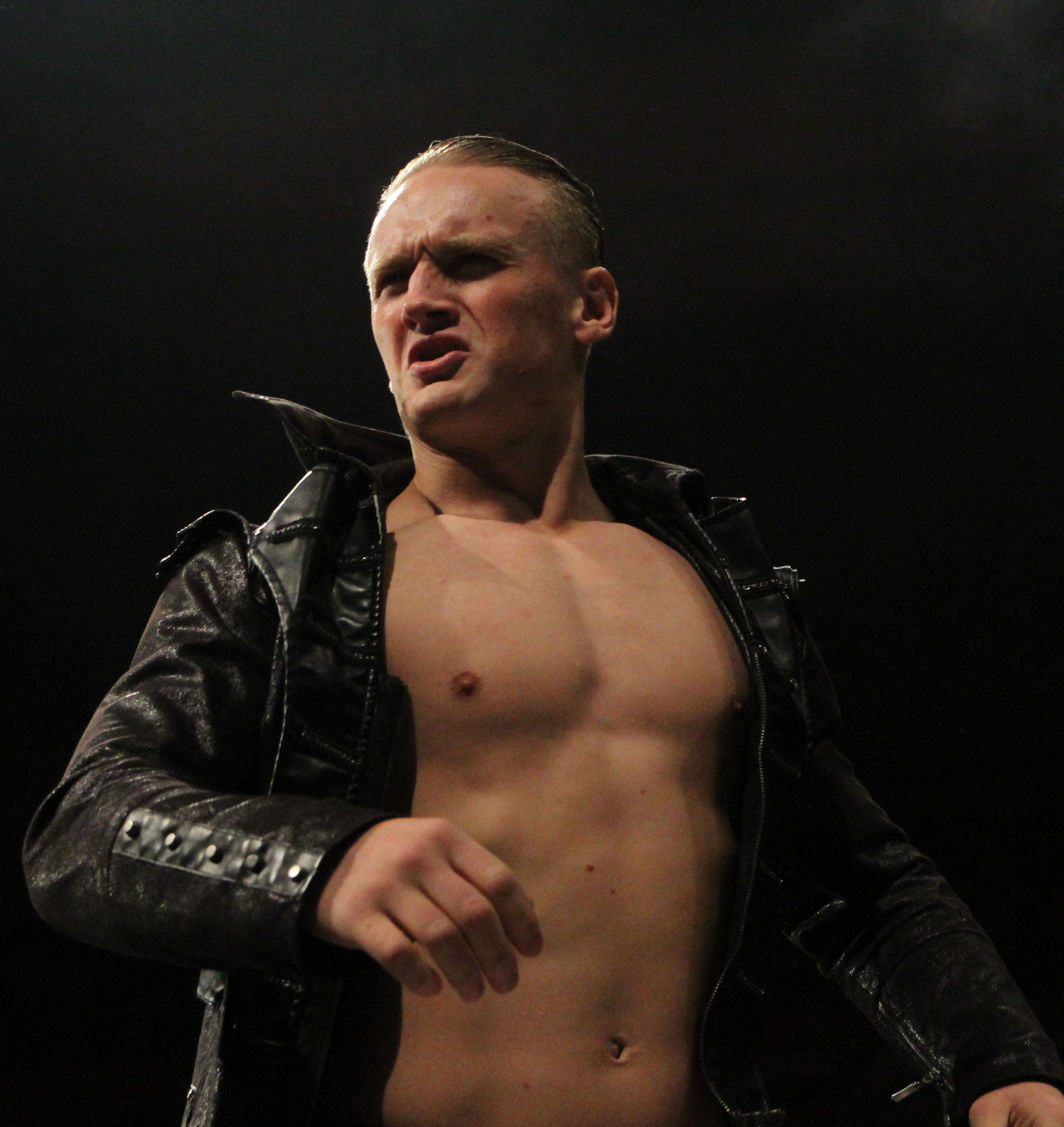
Dragunov before his final wXw match in March 2020

Dragunov began competing for Westside Xtreme Wrestling (wXw) in 2013. On 18 August 2013, he defeated Tony Blunt in the final of a tournament to become the inaugural wXw Shotgun Champion. He later became a two-time Shotgun Champion. Dragunov also became involved with the stable Cerberus and subsequently established himself in wXw's tag team division, eventually winning the wXw World Tag Team Championship three times.

In 2015 and 2016, Dragunov continued competing regularly for wXw, primarily as part of Cerberus. His profile grew considerably during this period, leading to his participation in the prestigious 16 Carat Gold Tournament in 2017. At 16 Carat Gold 2017, Dragunov defeated Timothy Thatcher in the quarterfinals on 11 March. The following night, he defeated John Klinger in the semifinals before defeating Walter in the final on 12 March to win the tournament.

Following his tournament victory, Dragunov began pursuing the wXw Unified World Wrestling Championship. He challenged champion John Klinger during 2017 but was ultimately defeated by Klinger in December. Dragunov subsequently took time away from wrestling before returning at 16 Carat Gold 2018. On 10 March 2018, he defeated reigning champion Klinger and Walter in a three-way match to win the wXw Unified World Wrestling Championship for the first time. The victory made Dragunov the first wrestler to complete the wXw Triple Crown.

Dragunov's championship reign continued throughout the first half of 2018, during which he defended the title against several challengers. His rivalry with Walter remained a central part of his reign, continuing the feud that had begun during the 2017 16 Carat Gold tournament. On 4 August, Dragunov lost the Unified World Wrestling Championship to Absolute Andy at Shortcut to the Top 2018.

Dragunov remained active in wXw during 2019. At 16 Carat Gold 2019, he defeated Pentagon Jr. in the quarterfinals before losing to Walter in the semifinals. Later that year, Dragunov continued appearing in major wXw events, including a June 2019 match against Marius Al-Ani. By this point, he had become one of wXw's most prominent performers and was also beginning his transition to WWE's NXT UK brand. Dragunov wrestled his final match for wXw on 8 March 2020 at 16 Carat Gold 2020, where he failed to win the Shotgun Championship in a three-way match that was won by Alexander Wolfe.

=== Progress Wrestling (2018–2020, 2022) ===
On 14 May 2018 at Super Strong Style 16, wXw general manager Christian Michael Jakobi arrived in Progress Wrestling, and challenged Pete Dunne to a match with Dragunov at an undetermined date. At Chapter 69, Dragunov appeared in the promotion for the first time, squaring off with Dunne, much to Jakobi's delight. At Chapter 72, Dunne accepted the challenge and the match was set for Progress' upcoming event at Wembley Arena. At Chapter 75, Jakobi continued to insult Dunne, to which he dragged Jakobi to the ring to attack him, before Dragunov made the save and the two faced off again. During Progress' tour of Germany, at the Oberhausen show, Dunne called out Dragunov, following British Strong Style's win over Rise (Ivan Kiev, Lucky Kid and Pete Bouncer). Once again, the two had a scuffle which had to be broken up by the officials. On 1 October, Dragunov's debut match for Progress ended in defeat, when Dunne trapped Dragunov's arm and then manipulated his hand to force the submission.

Dragunov began 2019 with a win over Timothy Thatcher at Chapter 83, but did not appear for the promotion until Super Strong Style 16. On night one, Dragunov defeated Chris Brookes in the first round. On night two, he quickly defeated Trevor Lee in the quarter-final, and on night three, he was in a three-way elimination match in the semi-final with David Starr and Travis Banks. Dragunov was the first wrestler to be eliminated when Banks defeated him by pinfall. At Chapter 91, he defeated Jordan Devlin in a number one contender match for the Unified World Championship, but the following day, at Chapter 92, he was defeated by Walter.

At Chapter 95, Dragunov took part in a rumble match for the Proteus Championship, which replaced the Atlas Championship. Dragunov entered in at number two in the match, and eliminated Niwa, TK Cooper and Chuck Mambo, before he and William Eaver simultaneously eliminated each other. From October to December, he was involved in a series of matches with Cara Noir. Having traded wins over each other at Chapter 96 and Chapter 97, the feud was ended at Chapter 99 in a two out of three falls match, in which Dragunov lost.

Dragunov made a one night return to Progress Wrestling at Chapter 131: 10th Anniversary Show on 25 March 2022, defeating Cara Noir.

=== WWE (2019–2026) ===
==== NXT UK (2019–2022) ====
In January 2019, it was reported that Rukober was going to sign with WWE, with the intention of performing for the promotion's NXT UK brand. He had previously undergone a WWE tryout in November 2013, but suffered a skull injury that kept him out of action for nearly a year. He received a second tryout in Cologne during WWE's European tour in November 2018, where he reportedly "turned heads." On 27 February 2019, WWE officially announced his signing.

On 15 May episode of NXT UK (taped 19 April), Dragunov made his debut for the brand as a face, defeating Jack Starz. He followed this with victories over Joseph Conners and Ashton Smith before suffering his first defeat to Kassius Ohno on 15 August. On 31 August, at NXT UK TakeOver: Cardiff, Dragunov answered Cesaro's open challenge in a losing effort.

On 17 October episode of NXT UK, Dragunov defeated Saxon Huxley while being watched by Alexander Wolfe. Following the match, Wolfe appeared to show an interest in Dragunov, leading to an encounter with fellow Imperium members Marcel Barthel and Fabian Aichner. On 11 November, Dragunov appeared to side with Imperium during their feud with Gallus, before turning against Imperium and aligning himself with Gallus. On 28 November, Dragunov and Gallus wrestled Imperium to a double countout. On 5 December, Walter demanded that Dragunov face Wolfe in a No Disqualification match, which Dragunov accepted. He was subsequently attacked by Imperium, with Wolfe powerbombing him through a table.

On 2 January 2020, Dragunov defeated Wolfe in the No Disqualification match, but was attacked afterward by Barthel and Aichner. On 12 January, during the main event of NXT UK TakeOver: Blackpool II, Dragunov interfered in Walter's NXT United Kingdom Championship match against Joe Coffey, striking Wolfe with the Torpedo Moscow and inadvertently causing Wolfe to fall onto Coffey's injured knee. This led to a subsequent feud between Dragunov and Coffey. On 20 February, Dragunov defeated Coffey, after which Coffey declared that Dragunov had repaid his debt to Gallus. During the same period, Dragunov appeared on NXT, where he became involved in a feud with Finn Bálor. Dragunov accepted Bálor's challenge to a match at Worlds Collide 2020 on 25 January, but was defeated. On 2 April 2020, Dragunov won a 20-man battle royal on NXT UK, last eliminating Tyler Bate to become the number-one contender for the NXT United Kingdom Championship. However, the COVID-19 pandemic disrupted NXT UK, delaying his championship opportunity. When the brand resumed later that year, Dragunov's rivalry with Walter was renewed. At NXT UK on 29 October, Walter defeated Dragunov by referee stoppage after Dragunov passed out in a rear naked choke.

Dragunov returned to NXT UK in January 2021, struggling psychologically with his defeat to Walter. His matches initially ended in referee stoppages, leading to a feud with Sam Gradwell. Dragunov defeated Gradwell in their second encounter, a No Disqualification match, on 25 March. On 6 May, Dragunov faced Dave Mastiff, but the match was stopped after Mastiff suffered a legitimate broken nose, bringing an end to the storyline involving Dragunov's matches ending by stoppage.

On 3 June, Dragunov defeated Noam Dar before becoming involved in the championship picture once again. On 24 June, he defeated Joe Coffey and Rampage Brown in a triple threat match to become the number-one contender for the NXT United Kingdom Championship against Walter. Their championship match was initially scheduled for 22 July but was postponed after Walter suffered a hand injury. The match was subsequently scheduled for a month later at NXT TakeOver 36 on 22 August, where he defeated Walter to win the NXT Uinited Kingdom Championship and ending Walter's two-year reign. Dragunov successfully defended his title throughout late 2021 and 2022. He defeated A-Kid, Jordan Devlin, and Roderick Strong in championship matches. He also defeated Devlin in a Loser Leaves NXT UK match on the 200th episode of NXT UK, forcing Devlin to leave the brand. On 7 July 2022, Dragunov was forced to vacate the NXT United Kingdom Championship after suffering a leg injury. His reign lasted 319 days in real time, although WWE officially recognizes it as 346 days due to the delayed broadcast dates of NXT UK.

==== NXT (2022–2024) ====
On 20 September 2022 episode of NXT, Dragunov made his return from injury, interrupting a segment between NXT Champion Bron Breakker and number one contender JD McDonagh. On 22 October, Dragunov fought Breakker and McDonagh in a triple threat for the NXT Championship at Halloween Havoc, but was unsuccessful. At Stand & Deliver on 1 April 2023, he took part in a fatal five-way match for the NXT North American Championship, but was pinned by reigning champion Wes Lee in a match that also featured JD McDonagh, Axiom, and Dragon Lee. At NXT Battleground on 28 May, he defeated Dijak in a Last Man Standing match. On 14 July episode of NXT, Dragunov defeated Breakker to earn an NXT Championship match against Carmelo Hayes at NXT The Great American Bash, but failed to win the title.

On 12 September episode of NXT, Dragunov defeated Wes Lee to earn another shot at Hayes' NXT Championship. On 30 September, Dragunov defeated Hayes at NXT No Mercy to win the NXT Championship for the first time in his career, becoming the first person to have won the NXT and NXT United Kingdom Championships. (Note: While Bron Breakker unified the NXT United Kingdom Championship into the NXT Championship at Worlds Collide on 4 September 2022, Breakker is not recognized as the final NXT United Kingdom Champion.) On Night 2 of NXT: Halloween Havoc on 31 October, Dragunov defeated Hayes in a rematch to retain his title, but was attacked by Baron Corbin after the match. At NXT Deadline, Dragunov successfully defended his title against Corbin. On 19 December episode of NXT, Dragunov was challenged to a title match by a returning Ridge Holland, who was trying to find himself after leaving his tag team partner Butch and to re-write his history, which Dragunov accepted. During the match, Holland dropped Dragunov on his head, where Dragunov kayfabe injured his neck and had to be stretchered off. Despite Dragunov signing the title match contract to face Trick Williams, who had won the Men's Iron Survivor Challenge at NXT Deadline for an NXT Championship match at NXT: New Year's Evil on 2 January 2024, it was later announced that Dragunov was not medically cleared to wrestle and the title match was rescheduled to NXT Vengeance Day, where Dragunov defeated Williams to retain the title.

On the following episode of NXT, Dragunov called out Carmelo Hayes for attacking Williams after their match at NXT Vengeance Day, only to have Dijak come out, leading to a brawl between the two. The two had a match later that night, in which Dragunov defeated Dijak after interference from Joe Gacy. After the match, Hayes came out and attacked Dragunov. At NXT: Roadblock, it was made official that Dragunov was going to defend the NXT Championship against D’Angelo at NXT Stand & Deliver on 6 April 2024, where Dragunov successfully defended the title. On 9 April episode of NXT, Dragunov was called out by Williams for a title shot. Dragunov agreed to a title match at Spring Breakin' on the condition that Williams leave NXT if he loses, which Williams accepted. At Week 1 of Spring Breakin' on 23 April, Dragunov lost the title to Williams, ending his reign at 206 days in his final match in NXT.

==== Main roster and departure (2024–2026) ====
Dragunov won his main roster debut match against Shinsuke Nakamura on the Raw after WrestleMania XL. At the 2024 WWE Draft, Dragunov got drafted to the Raw brand. He participated in the King of the Ring tournament and wrestled Sami Zayn for the Intercontinental Championship. However, he suffered a torn ACL during a live event, keeping him out of action for a year.

Dragunov returned on 17 October 2025 episode of SmackDown, answering Zayn's open challenge for the United States Championship and subsequently defeated Zayn to win the title while officially becoming a member of the SmackDown brand. Over the following episodes of SmackDown, Dragunov continued the United States Championship open challenge, recording successful title defences against Aleister Black, Nathan Frazer, Johnny Gargano, Axiom, JD McDonagh, Carmelo Hayes, and Tommaso Ciampa. During the SmackDown tapings on 19 December, he lost the title to Hayes in another open challenge, which aired on tape delay on 26 December, ending his reign at 63 days (70 days as recognized by WWE due to the tape delay).

After his title loss, Dragunov competed in the Royal Rumble match at the namesake event on 31 January 2026, and the André the Giant Memorial Battle Royal on the 17 April episode of SmackDown, with the latter being his last match in WWE. On August 20, it was reported that Dragunov's contract with WWE had expired and he voluntarily elected not to renew, ending his seven-year tenure with the promotion.

=== All Elite Wrestling (2026–present) ===
On 17 October 2026 at WrestleDream, Dragunov made his All Elite Wrestling (AEW) debut and was announced as the newest signee for the promotion. He made his in-ring debut on the following episode of Dynamite, defeating "Speedball" Mike Bailey. On 14 November at Full Gear, Dragunov defeated Tommaso Ciampa to win the AEW National Championship and marked his first championship in AEW.

== Other media ==
Rukober made his video game debut as Ilja Dragunov in the Most Wanted Pack DLC for WWE 2K22. He is also a playable character in WWE 2K23, WWE 2K24, WWE 2K25 and WWE 2K26.

== Personal life ==
Rukober is currently in a relationship with fellow wrestler Leigh Marie Laurel, formerly known as Jin Tala in WWE. He has one son from a previous relationship. He is a long-term sufferer of panic attacks, so when he made his WWE return in 2025, he had a new tattoo on his neck as a symbolic tribute.

== Championship and accomplishments ==
- All Elite Wrestling
  - AEW National Championship (1 time, current)
- CBS Sports
  - Match of the Year (2020) vs. Walter
- ESPN
  - Ranked No. 26 of the 30 best Pro Wrestlers Under 30 in 2023
- Eurowrestling-Company
  - EW-COM Ringmaster Tournament (2013)
- Next Step Wrestling
  - Next Step European Championship (2 times)
- Pro Wrestling Illustrated
  - Ranked No. 30 of the top 500 singles wrestlers in the PWI 500 in 2024
- Sports Illustrated
  - Comeback Performer of the Year (2025)
- Westside Xtreme Wrestling
  - wXw Unified World Wrestling Championship (1 time)
  - wXw World Tag Team Championship (3 times) – with Robert Dreissker (1), Dirty Dragan and Julian Nero (1) and Walter (1)
  - wXw Shotgun Championship (2 times, inaugural)
  - First wXw Triple Crown
  - International Tag Team Tournament (2018) - with Avalanche
  - 16 Carat Gold Tournament (2017)
  - Mitteldeutschland Cup (2013)
  - wXw Shotgun Championship Tournament (2013)
- WWE
  - WWE United States Championship (1 time)
  - NXT Championship (1 time)
  - NXT United Kingdom Championship (1 time)
  - NXT Year-End Award (2 times)
    - Male Superstar of the Year (2023)
    - Match of the Year (2023) vs. Carmelo Hayes at NXT No Mercy
