= All In (2026) =

All Elite Wrestling pay-per-view and livestreaming event

All In: London
- Promotional poster featuring various AEW wrestlers
- Promotion: All Elite Wrestling
- Date: August 30, 2026
- City: London, England
- Venue: Wembley Stadium
- Attendance: 41,102 (Note: Turnstile attendance, which reflects the amount of tickets used for admission, was recorded at 41,102 by Brent Council. Tickets distributed, which reflects complimentary and sold tickets, was estimated at 46,987.)
- Buy rate: 220,000

Pay-per-view chronology
← Previous; Redemption	Next → All Out

All In chronology
← Previous; 2025	Next → —

AEW in the United Kingdom chronology
← Previous; Holiday Bash	Next → Dynasty

The 2026 All In, also promoted as All In: London, was a professional wrestling pay-per-view (PPV) event produced by the American company All Elite Wrestling (AEW). It was AEW's fourth annual All In, and the fifth overall. The event took place on August 30, 2026, at Wembley Stadium in London, England during the United Kingdom's August Bank Holiday weekend. This marked AEW's return to Wembley Stadium as well as All In to its traditional August Bank Holiday scheduling, following the 2025 event, which was held in July at Globe Life Field in Arlington, Texas, United States, while that year's Forbidden Door instead occupied the August Bank Holiday weekend at London's O_{2} Arena.

Thirteen matches were contested at the event, including five on the Buy In. In the main event, Will Ospreay defeated Kenny Omega to win the AEW World Championship. In other prominent matches, Mercedes Moné defeated Willow Nightingale to win the AEW Women's World Championship, Cage and Cope (Christian Cage and Adam Copeland) defeated The Young Bucks (Matt Jackson and Nick Jackson) to retain the AEW World Tag Team Championship, and Kazuchika Okada defeated defending champion Kyle Fletcher and Konosuke Takeshita in a three-way match to win the AEW International Championship. The event was also notable for the returns of Britt Baker, who had been on hiatus since November 2024, and FTR (Cash Wheeler and Dax Harwood), who had also been on hiatus since Double or Nothing in May earlier that year. It was also notable for the debut of The New Level (Kofi and Austin Creed; previously known in the WWE as Kofi Kingston and Xavier Woods).

== Production ==
=== Background ===
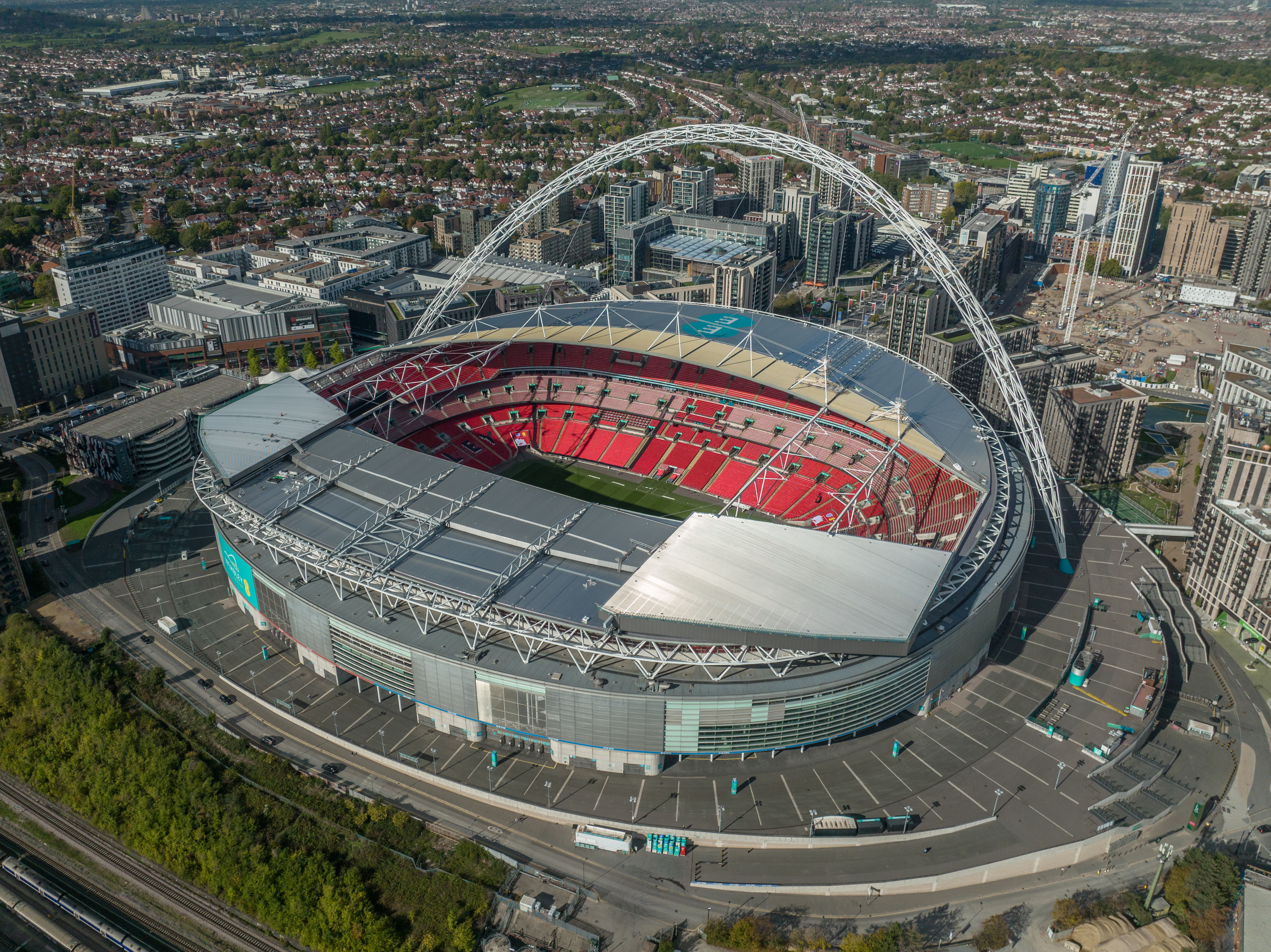
This was the third All In held at Wembley Stadium in London, England, after 2023 and 2024.

All In was first held as an independent professional wrestling pay-per-view (PPV) event in September 2018, and was produced by members of The Elite in association with Ring of Honor (ROH), which retained the rights to All In. The event inspired the formation of the American promotion All Elite Wrestling (AEW) in January 2019. After AEW president Tony Khan purchased ROH in March 2022, AEW revived All In as its first PPV event in the United Kingdom, with both the 2023 and 2024 events held during the August Bank Holiday weekend at Wembley Stadium in London, England, and the 2025 event held in July in Arlington, Texas, United States. All In would become AEW's biggest annual event, subsequently regarded as one of the "big five", along with Double or Nothing, All Out, Full Gear, and Revolution, the company's five biggest annual events.

During the 2024 All In, AEW announced both the 2025 and 2026 events, with 2026 confirmed to return All In to Wembley Stadium. The following year in July, the date for the 2026 event was confirmed as August 30, returning All In to its traditional August Bank Holiday weekend scheduling. The event went head-to-head against WWE's livestreaming events AAA Ola de Calor and NXT Heatwave.

=== Other All In week events ===
Other on-screen personnel
Role	Name
Commentators	Excalibur (Pre-show and PPV)
Commentators	Tony Schiavone (Pre-show and PPV)
Commentators	Bryan Danielson (Pre-show and PPV)
Commentators	Taz (Pre-show and PPV)
Commentators	Don Callis (International title match)
Commentators	Nigel McGuinness (World Title matches)
Spanish commentators	Carlos Cabrera
Spanish commentators	Alvaro Riojas
Spanish commentators	Ariel Levy
Ring announcers	Justin Roberts (PPV)
Ring announcers	Arkady Aura (Pre-show and PPV)
Referees	Aubrey Edwards
Referees	Bryce Remsburg
Referees	Mike Posey
Referees	Paul Turner
Referees	Rick Knox
Referees	Stephon Smith
Interviewer	Lexy Nair
Pre-show hosts	Renee Paquette
Pre-show hosts	Mick Foley
Pre-show hosts	Jeff Jarrett
Pre-show hosts	Paul Wight

On August 26, 2026, AEW held a double taping of Dynamite and Collision, which took place at the OVO Hydro in Glasgow, Scotland and served as the go-home show for All In.

Also as part of All In weekend, AEW's streaming service MyAEW broadcast three events from their promotional partners, Consejo Mundial de Lucha Libre (CMLL), Revolution Pro Wrestling (RevPro), and women's wrestling promotion Pro-Wrestling: EVE (EVE), as a lead-in for All In. On August 28, MyAEW streamed CMLL Viernes Espectaculares from Mexico City, where AEW wrestler Eddie Kingston challenged for the CMLL World Heavyweight Championship. Additionally on August 28, MyAEW streamed EVE 153: EVE x The World 2 from London, during which Kris Statlander won the Pro-Wrestling: EVE Championship and Skye Blue participated in a death match. On August 29, MyAEW streamed the RevPro 14th Anniversary Show from London, which saw Will Ospreay return to RevPro and invite Callum Newman to accompany him for his All In main event.

=== Storylines ===
All In featured professional wrestling matches that involved different wrestlers from pre-existing scripted feuds and storylines. Storylines were produced on AEW's weekly television programs, Dynamite and Collision.

Will Ospreay won the 2026 Owen Hart Cup, earning himself a title shot at the AEW World Championship at All In. Kenny Omega defeated MJF for the AEW World Championship in what was his last chance to challenge for the title, setting up a match with Ospreay at Wembley. Mercedes Mone won the Women's Owen Hart Cup for a shot at AEW Women's Championship at All In just like Osprey.

== Reception ==
The event as a whole received critical acclaim, with particularly positive reactions directed toward the last three matches. Wrestling journalist Dave Meltzer of the Wrestling Observer Newsletter rated the AEW World Championship main event 6.5 stars and called it "the second best match I've ever seen".

== Results ==
No.	Results	Stipulations	Times
1^{P}	Lio Rush and The Rascalz (Dezmond Xavier, Myron Reed, and Zachary Wentz) defeated The Opps (Hook, Katsuyori Shibata, Anthony Bowens, and Action Andretti) by pinfall	Eight-man tag team match	9:10
2^{P}	Harley Cameron and Kris Statlander defeated Sisters of Sin (Julia Hart and Skye Blue) by pinfall	Tag team match	9:55
3^{P}	Boom & Doom ("Big Boom!" A.J. and Q. T. Marshall) and The Hurt Syndicate (Bobby Lashley and Shelton Benjamin) (with Big Justice) defeated Shane Taylor Promotions (Shane Taylor, Lee Moriarty, Carlie Bravo, and Capt. Shawn Dean) (with Christyan XO and Trish Adora) by pinfall	Eight-man tag team match	11:25
4^{P}	Persephone defeated Maya World (c) by pinfall	Singles match for the AEW TBS Championship	11:50
5^{P}	Swerve Strickland and The New Level (Kofi and Austin Creed) (with Prince Nana) defeated "Hangman" Adam Page and Brodido (Brody King and Bandido) (c), Bang Bang Gang (Jay White, Austin Gunn and Colten Gunn), The Conglomeration (Orange Cassidy, Roderick Strong, and Kyle O'Reilly), Death Riders (Claudio Castagnoli, Pac, and Wheeler Yuta) (with Marina Shafir), The Demand (Ricochet, Bishop Kaun, and Toa Liona), and The Dogs (David Finlay, Clark Connors, and Gabe Kidd) (Note: The match concluded on the main card.)	Trios Roulette Royale for the AEW World Trios Championship	39:00
6	The Brawling Birds (Jamie Hayter and Alex Windsor) defeated Divine Dominion (Megan Bayne and Lena Kross) (c) by pinfall	Tag team match for the AEW Women's World Tag Team Championship	11:40
7	Jon Moxley (c) defeated Nigel McGuinness by submission	Continental Challenge Cup final for the AEW Continental Championship	17:15
8	Kazuchika Okada defeated Kyle Fletcher (c) and Konosuke Takeshita by pinfall	Three-way match for the AEW International Championship	13:10
9	Andrade El Ídolo won by pinning Nick Wayne (Note: Order of entrants: Andrade El Ídolo, MJF, Nick Wayne, Mike Bailey, Tommaso Ciampa, Jericho, Mark Davis, Komander, Místico, Daniel Garcia, and Jack Perry.)	Men's Casino Gauntlet match for a future AEW World Championship match	21:05
10	Cage and Cope (Christian Cage and Adam Copeland) (c) defeated The Young Bucks (Matt Jackson and Nick Jackson) by pinfall	Tag team match for the AEW World Tag Team Championship	20:00
11	Darby Allin defeated Kevin Knight (c) by pinfall	Falls Count Anywhere match for the AEW TNT Championship	15:50
12	Mercedes Moné defeated Willow Nightingale (c) by submission	Singles match for the AEW Women's World Championship	21:50
13	Will Ospreay (with Callum Newman, Francesco Akira, and Henare) defeated Kenny Omega (c) (with Brandon Cutler, Michael Nakazawa, Matt Jackson, and Nick Jackson) by pinfall	Singles match for the AEW World Championship	34:25
(c) / – the champion(s) heading into the match; P / – the match was broadcast on the pre-show

=== Trios Roulette Royale entrances and eliminations ===
Two teams started the match, consisting of three members each. At random intervals, another trio entered. A member of a team was eliminated after going over the top rope with both feet touching the floor. All members of a team had to be eliminated for the whole team to be eliminated from the match.

#	Team	Entrant	Order	Eliminated by	Eliminations
1	Bang Bang Gang	Austin Gunn	2	Toa Liona	0
1	Bang Bang Gang	Colten Gunn	1	Clark Connors	0
1	Bang Bang Gang	Jay White	13	David Finlay	2
2	The Dogs	Clark Connors	11	Jay White	2
2	The Dogs	David Finlay	12	Jay White	2
2	The Dogs	Gabe Kidd	16	Swerve Strickland	4
3	The Demand	Bishop Kaun	6	Kofi and Swerve Strickland	2
3	The Demand	Ricochet	15	Swerve Strickland	2
3	The Demand	Toa Liona	7	Austin Creed and Swerve Strickland	2
4	The Conglomeration	Kyle O'Reilly	4	Claudio Castagnoli, David Finlay, and Pac	0
4	The Conglomeration	Orange Cassidy	9	Ricochet	1
4	The Conglomeration	Roderick Strong	3	Bishop Kaun and Gabe Kidd	0
5	Death Riders	Claudio Castagnoli	18	Kofi	2
5	Death Riders	Pac	17	Austin Creed	2
5	Death Riders	Wheeler Yuta	8	Orange Cassidy	1
6	"Hangman" Adam Page and Brodido (c)	"Hangman" Adam Page	14	Ricochet	0
6	"Hangman" Adam Page and Brodido (c)	Bandido	10	Gabe Kidd	0
6	"Hangman" Adam Page and Brodido (c)	Brody King	5	Death Riders, The Dogs, Bishop Kaun, and Toa Liona	0
7	Swerve Strickland and The New Level	Austin Creed	-	Winners	2
7	Swerve Strickland and The New Level	Kofi	-	Winners	2
7	Swerve Strickland and The New Level	Swerve Strickland	-	Winners	4

=== Continental Challenge Cup bracket ===
- The matchups for the first round, quarter-finals, and semi-finals were decided via blind draw, similar to the FA Cup. The bracket shown is for illustrative purposes.

First round
August 12 – Paradise, NV
Jon Moxley (c)	TKO
Jack Perry	15:42
August 12 – Paradise, NV
David Finlay	13:20
Jay White	Pin
August 8 – Colorado Springs, CO
Ace Austin	12:06
Claudio Castagnoli	Pin
August 8 – Colorado Springs, CO
Jake Doyle	11:59
Eddie Kingston	Sub
August 8 – Colorado Springs, CO
Orange Cassidy	Pin
Matt Sydal	11:33
August 15 – Paradise, NV
Kyle O'Reilly	Pin
Roderick Strong	12:56
August 15 – Paradise, NV
Brian Cage	9:28
Hechicero	Pin
August 15 – Paradise, NV
Nigel McGuinness	Pin
Katsuyori Shibata	12:24

Quarter-finals
August 19 – Baltimore, MD
Jon Moxley (c)	TKO
Jay White	19:20
August 22 – Reading, PA
Claudio Castagnoli	Sub
Daniel Garcia	15:39
August 22 – Reading, PA
Orange Cassidy	14:35
Kyle O'Reilly	Sub
August 19 – Baltimore, MD
Hechicero	9:46
Nigel McGuinness	Sub

Semi-finals
August 26 – Glasgow
Jon Moxley (c)	TKO
Claudio Castagnoli	15:55
August 26 – Glasgow
Kyle O'Reilly	12:00
Nigel McGuinness	Sub

Final
August 30 – London
Jon Moxley (c)	Sub
Nigel McGuinness	17:15
Play-in match (Note: A play-in match took place at ROH Death Before Dishonor to replace an injured Eddie Kingston)
August 21 – Philadelphia, PA
Daniel Garcia	Sub
Adam Priest	16:55
