= Persephone (wrestler) =

American professional wrestler (born 2001)

- Persephone as the CMLL World Women's Champion in August 2026

Personal information
- Citizenship: United States; Mexico
- Born: Priscilla Miranda; August 3, 2001 (age 25) El Paso, Texas, U.S.
- Education: University of Texas at El Paso (BS)

Professional wrestling career
- Ring name(s): Black Widow; Perse; Persephone; Viktoria
- Billed height: 5 ft 4 in (163 cm)
- Billed weight: 145 lb (66 kg)
- Trained by: Rey Escorpión; Scorpio 2000; Tritón
- Debut: August 2016

Priscilla Miranda (born August 3, 2001), better known by her ring name Persephone, is an American and Mexican professional wrestler. She is signed to both the Mexican promotion Consejo Mundial de Lucha Libre (CMLL) and the American promotion All Elite Wrestling (AEW), having been signed to CMLL since May 2023 and AEW since January 2026. In CMLL, she is the current CMLL World Women's Champion in her first reign, while in AEW, she is a former one-time AEW TBS Champion. Initially performing under a mask, she voluntarily removed her mask in 2023.

== Early life and education ==
Persephone was born and raised in El Paso, Texas and holds dual American and Mexican citizenship. In her youth, her family took her to lucha libre shows in El Paso and Ciudad Juárez. She began wrestling in front of crowds at 15 years old. She attended University of Texas at El Paso and holds a bachelor's degree in kinesiology.

== Professional wrestling career ==
=== Early career (2016–2023) ===
Persephone began wrestling in August 2016. Persephone made her wrestling debut under New Era Wrestling (NEW), a local wrestling promotion in El Paso, Texas. During her time on the independent scene, she wrestled for several months under the name of Black Widow. Over the next few years, she worked for several independent promotions, as well as wrestling two matches for Lucha Libre AAA Worldwide.

=== Consejo Mundial de Lucha Libre (2023–present) ===
In 2023, Persephone signed with AAA's rival promotion Consejo Mundial de Lucha Libre (CMLL). In CMLL, Persephone notably has had a feud with Tessa Blanchard and generally is a ruda, an evil character, as opposed to the tecnicas who are the good doers. She won the 2024 Campeonato de Amazonas after defeating veteran Zeuxis in an upset during the championship finals on October 18, 2024. At La Noche de las Amazonas ("The Night of the Amazons") on March 6, 2026, Persephone defeated Mercedes Moné to win the CMLL World Women's Championship.

=== All Elite Wrestling / Ring of Honor (2025–present) ===
On July 11, 2025, Persephone made her Ring of Honor (ROH) debut by competing in a Worldwide Women's Wild Card four-way match for the interim ROH Women's World Television Championship at Supercard of Honor, which was won by Mina Shirakawa. On August 24, at the All Elite Wrestling (AEW) and New Japan Pro-Wrestling (NJPW) co-promoted event Forbidden Door, Persephone wrestled in a four-way match for Mercedes Moné's AEW TBS Championship, but lost.

In January 2026, Persephone announced on CMLL's weekly show Informa that she had signed with AEW, while also keeping her contract with CMLL. On August 30, 2026 at All In, Persephone defeated Maya World to win the AEW TBS Championship after interference from a returning Britt Baker, marking her first title in the promotion, making her a double champion and the second person after Mercedes Moné to hold both championships simultaneously. On September 26 at All Out, Persephone successfully defended her title against the debuting Dani Luna in an open challenge. On October 17 at WrestleDream, Persephone successfully defended her title against Luna, Hyan, and Queen Aminata in a four-way match. Less than two weeks later at Fright Night Dynamite on October 28, she lost the TBS Championship to Aminata, ending her reign at 59 days. The following week, Persephone competed in a six-on-six Blood and Guts match at the namesake event, where her team was defeated. She failed to regain the TBS Championship at the Saturday Tailgate Brawl edition of Full Gear on November 14..

== Championships and accomplishments ==
- All Elite Wrestling
  - AEW TBS Championship (1 time)
- Consejo Mundial de Lucha Libre
  - CMLL World Women's Championship (1 time, current)
  - Grand Prix de Amazonas (2025)
  - CMLL Universal Amazons Championship (2024)
  - Copa Mujeres Revolucionarias (2024)
  - Copa Tzompantli (2026)
- KAOZ Lucha Libre
  - KAOZ Women's Tag Team Championship (1 time) – with Sexy Star
- Pro Wrestling Illustrated
  - Ranked No. 7 of the top 250 female wrestlers in the PWI Women's 250 in 2026
