= List of former championships in Ring of Honor =

Retired Ring of Honor titles

In professional wrestling, championships are competed for in pre-planned matches as part of scripted storylines. This article is a list championships retired by the wrestling company Ring of Honor (ROH) and previously competed for by the promotion's roster of contracted wrestlers.

== Defunct championships promoted by ROH ==
This section of championships are a list of titles which were exclusive to ROH.

No.	Championship	Date of introduction	First champion(s)	Date retired	Final champion(s)	Years active	Notes
1	ROH Top of the Class Trophy	November 4, 2005	Davey Andrews	October 25, 2008	Rhett Titus	3	The championship was later abandoned after Rhett Titus victory.
2	Women of Honor World Championship	December 15, 2017	Sumie Sakai	January 1, 2020	Kelly Klein	4	Kelly Klein was stripped of the championship after ROH did not renew her contract. The Women of Honor World Championship was subsequently retired and replaced with the ROH Women's World Championship.

== Past championships used by ROH ==
Promotion	Championship	Last ROH Reign	Time used in ROH
Shimmer Women Athletes	Shimmer Championship	Nicole Matthews	2007–2014
Shimmer Women Athletes	Shimmer Tag Team Championship	Daizee Haze and Tomoka Nakagawa	2008–2011
New Japan Pro-Wrestling	IWGP Junior Heavyweight Tag Team Championships	The Young Bucks	May 10, 2014 – June 21, 2014
New Japan Pro-Wrestling	IWGP Tag Team Championship	The Bullet Club (Doc Gallows and Karl Anderson)	May 17, 2014 – January 4, 2015
New Japan Pro-Wrestling	IWGP Heavyweight Championship	AJ Styles	May 17 2014 – October 13, 2014
New Japan Pro-Wrestling	IWGP United States Heavyweight Championship	Kenny Omega	October 15, 2017 – January 28, 2018
New Japan Pro-Wrestling	NEVER Openweight Championship	Jeff Cobb	April 6, 2019 – May 3, 2019
New Japan Pro-Wrestling	IWGP Junior Heavyweight Championship	Dragon Lee	April 6, 2019 – June 9, 2019
New Japan Pro-Wrestling	IWGP Intercontinental Championship	Kota Ibushi	April 6, 2019 – June 9, 2019
New Japan Pro-Wrestling	NJPW World Television Championship	Zack Sabre Jr.	2023
New Japan Pro-Wrestling	Strong Women's Championship	Willow Nightingale	June 8, 2023 – July 5, 2023
National Wrestling Alliance	NWA Worlds Heavyweight Championship	Nick Aldis	2008; October 21, 2018 – August 29, 2021
National Wrestling Alliance	NWA World Women's Championship	Allysin Kay	May 12, 2019 – January 24, 2020
National Wrestling Alliance	NWA National Championship	Colt Cabana	May 12, 2019 – December 14, 2019
National Wrestling Alliance	NWA World Tag Team Championships	Royce Isaacs & Thomas Latimer	September 7, 2019 – October 1, 2019
National Wrestling Alliance	NWA World Women's Tag Team Championships	The Hex (Allysin Kay & Marti Belle)	October 27, 2021 – June 11, 2022
Revolution Pro Wrestling	British Heavyweight Championship	Zack Sabre Jr.	April 6, 2019 – August 31, 2019
Lucha Libre AAA Worldwide	AAA Mega Championship	El Hijo del Vikingo	2023

== See also ==
- List of Ring of Honor pay-per-view events
- List of Ring of Honor personnel
- List of Ring of Honor alumni
- List of Ring of Honor tournaments
