= AEW World Trios Championship =

Men's professional wrestling tag team championship

- The standard AEW World Trios Championship belts

Details
- Promotion: All Elite Wrestling
- Date established: July 27, 2022
- Current champions: Swerve Strickland and The New Level (Austin Creed and Kofi)
- Date won: November 14, 2026

Other names
- AEW World Trios Championship (2022–present); Unified World Trios Championship (Note: In tandem with the ROH World Six-Man Tag Team Championship.) (2024)
Statistics
- First champions: The Elite (Kenny Omega, Matt Jackson, and Nick Jackson)
- Most reigns: As a team (2 reigns): The Elite (Kenny Omega, Matt Jackson, and Nick Jackson); "Hangman" Adam Page and Brodido (Brody King and Bandido); Swerve Strickland and The New Level (Austin Creed and Kofi); As individuals (3 reigns): "Hangman" Adam Page; Brody King
- Longest reign: The Opps (Samoa Joe, Powerhouse Hobbs, and Katsuyori Shibata) (274 days) (Note: 276 days as recognized by AEW due to tape delay.)
- Shortest reign: The Elite (Kenny Omega, Matt Jackson, and Nick Jackson) (1st reign, 3 days) (Note: AEW officially recognizes that The Dogs (David Finlay, Clark Connors, and Gabe Kidd) have the shortest reign at 1 day due to tape delay, although they actually held the title for 4 days.)
- Oldest champion: Billy Gunn (59 years, 289 days)
- Youngest champion: Nick Wayne (19 years, 10 days)
- Heaviest champion: The Opps (Samoa Joe, Powerhouse Hobbs, and Katsuyori Shibata) (760 lbs combined)

The AEW World Trios Championship is a men's professional wrestling world tag team championship created and promoted by the American promotion All Elite Wrestling (AEW). It is a specialized tag team championship, being contested by teams of three wrestlers, referred to as trios. The reigning champions are Swerve Strickland and The New Level (Austin Creed and Kofi), who are in their record-tying second reign as a team, while it is the respective second reign for each individually. They won the title by defeating "Hangman" Adam Page and Brodido (Brody King and Bandido) in a Texas Death match at Full Gear on November 14, 2026.

The title was established on July 27, 2022, and the inaugural champions were The Elite (Kenny Omega, Matt Jackson, and Nick Jackson). From April until July 2024, the AEW World Trios Championship was held and defended together with the ROH World Six-Man Tag Team Championship of sister promotion Ring of Honor (ROH) as the Unified World Trios Championship.

== History ==
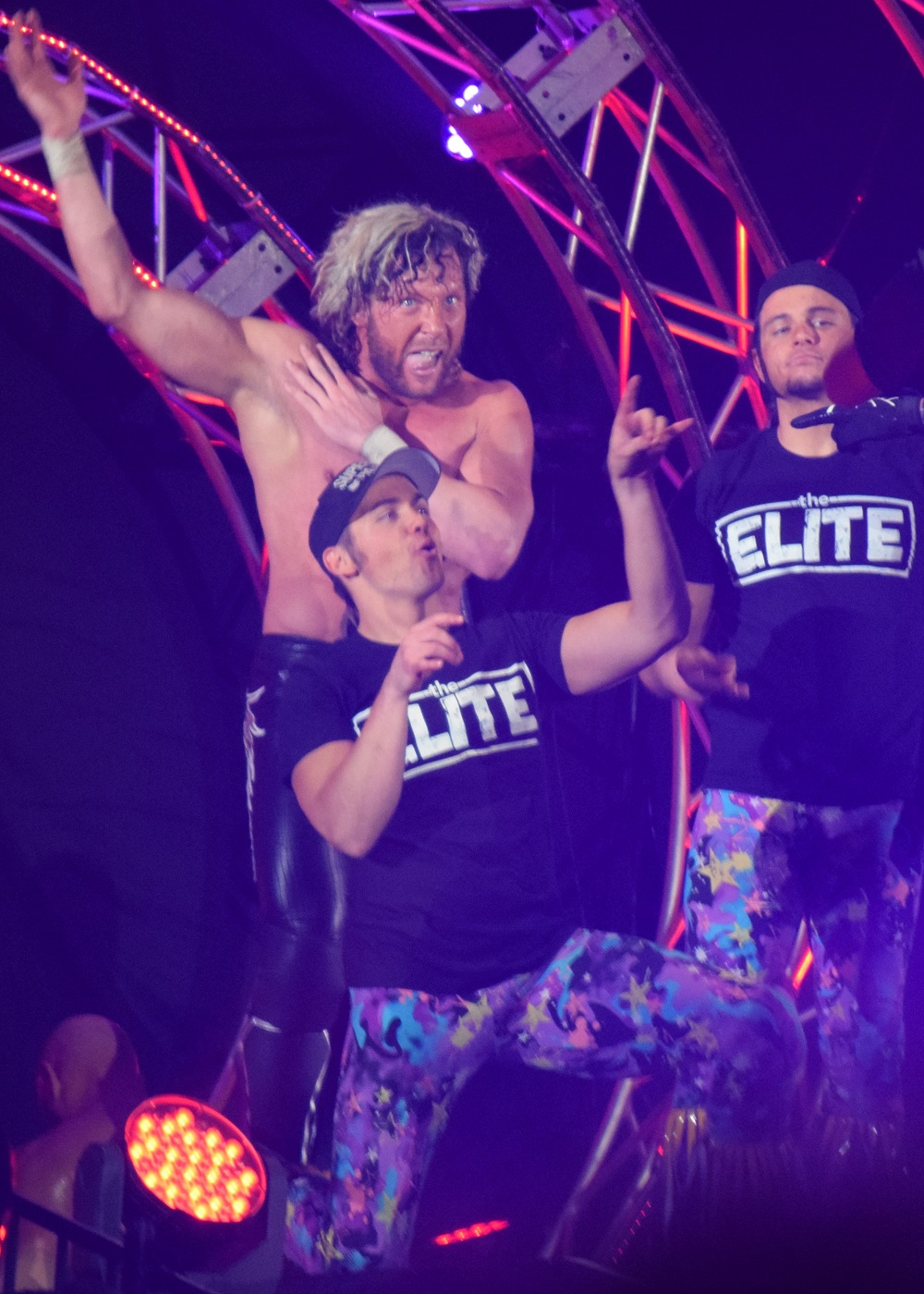
Record two-time and inaugural champions The Elite (Kenny Omega, Matt Jackson, and Nick Jackson)

The professional wrestling championship was introduced by All Elite Wrestling (AEW) for its men's division on July 27, 2022. During that night's Dynamite: Fight for the Fallen special, AEW announced a tournament for the inaugural AEW World Trios Championship, which would culminate at the All Out pay-per-view on September 4, 2022. Unlike the AEW World Tag Team Championship, which is a standard world tag team championship contested by teams of two wrestlers, the Trios Championship is contested by teams of three wrestlers, referred to as trios. At All Out, The Elite (Kenny Omega, Matt Jackson, and Nick Jackson) defeated "Hangman" Adam Page and The Dark Order (Alex Reynolds and John Silver) in the tournament final to become the inaugural champions.

Following berating comments made by reigning AEW World Champion CM Punk at the All Out post-event media scrum on September 5, a legitimate physical altercation occurred between Punk and The Elite. As a result, AEW president Tony Khan suspended all involved. On the September 7 episode of Dynamite, Khan announced that both the World Championship and Trios Championship were vacated. Khan then announced that the episode's scheduled six-man tag team match between Death Triangle (Pac, Penta El Zero M, and Rey Fénix) and Best Friends (Chuck Taylor, Trent Beretta, and Orange Cassidy) would be for the vacant Trios Championship, which was won by Death Triangle.

During Dynasty: Zero Hour on April 21, 2024, Ring of Honor (ROH) World Six-Man Tag Team Champions Bullet Club Gold (Jay White, Austin Gunn, and Colten Gunn) defeated The Acclaimed (Anthony Bowens, Max Caster, and Billy Gunn) to win the AEW World Trios Championship in a winners take all championship unification match to unify the titles and become recognized as the Unified World Trios Champions. When Bullet Club Gold (who since became known as the Bang Bang Gang) were stripped of the Unified Trios Titles on July 10, 2024 (aired July 13), the AEW and ROH titles were separated, thus ending the unification.

Ahead of Full Gear on November 14, 2026, it was announced on that the AEW World Trios Championship had been given an updated design, now fearutuing side plates featuring Benjamin Satterly, aka Pac, performing his Brutalizer submission hold and the ends of the leather strap now featuring a 'In Memory Of' graphic for Pac. This was done to honor Pac after his passing on September 27, 2026, less than 24 hours after All Out where he had just performed the night before.

=== Inaugural tournament ===
Quarterfinals; Dynamite (August 17 and 24, 2022); Rampage (August 19 and 26, 2022)
Death Triangle (Pac, Penta El Zero M, and Rey Fénix)	24:51
United Empire (Will Ospreay, Kyle Fletcher, and Mark Davis)	Pin
La Facción Ingobernable (Andrade El Idolo, Dragon Lee, and Rush)	20:50
The Elite (Kenny Omega, Matt Jackson, and Nick Jackson)	Pin
The House of Black (Malakai Black, Brody King, and Buddy Matthews)	9:03
The Dark Order (Alex Reynolds, John Silver, and Preston Vance)	Pin
The Trustbusters (Ari Daivari, Parker Boudreaux, and Slim J)	10:32
Best Friends (Chuck Taylor, Trent Beretta, and Orange Cassidy)	Pin

Semifinals; Dynamite (August 31, 2022); Rampage (September 2, 2022)
United Empire	18:59
The Elite	Pin
"Hangman" Adam Page and The Dark Order (Alex Reynolds and John Silver) (Note: Page replaced Preston Vance because the latter was not medically cleared to compete.)	Pin
Best Friends	11:10

Finals; All Out (September 4, 2022)
The Elite	Pin
"Hangman" Adam Page and The Dark Order (Alex Reynolds and John Silver)	19:50

== Belt design ==
Two-time champions as a team, Brodido (Brody King and Bandido) and "Hangman" Adam Page, with the standard championship belts.

The standard AEW World Trios Championship belts were made by Ron Edwardsen of Red Leather Belts. They have five gold plates on black leather straps. The circular center plate has a blue globe at the center with "TRIOS" written across the globe in black with a gold border. Above the globe is a black banner that says "WORLD" in gold while a black banner below the globe says "CHAMPION" in gold. At the top of the plate is AEW's logo while filigree fills out the rest of the plate. Sitting on either side of the center plate are two side plates each. The inner side plates show two wrestlers performing simultaneous superkicks on another wrestler. The outer side plates originally showed a wrestler performing an electric chair driver, but when the standard belts returned in 2024 after the custom "scissoring" belts had been used, the outer side plates were changed to saying "WORLD TRIOS CHAMPION" (which had first appeared on the scissoring belts).

Ahead of Full Gear on November 14, 2026, AEW updated the title to feature a new side plate showing two-time champion Pac in tribute to him following his death on September 27. The end of the strap also reads "In Memory of Benjamin Satterley 1986–2026."

=== Custom designs ===
The custom "scissoring" belts first used by The Acclaimed (Max Caster, Anthony Bowens, and Billy Gunn). Bullet Club Gold/Bang Bang Gang (Jay White, Austin Gunn, and Colten Gunn) then held these belts in tandem with the standard belts and the ROH World Six-Man Tag Team Championship belts to represent the Unified World Trios Championship.

During House of Black's (Malakai Black, Brody King, and Buddy Matthews) reign that began in March 2023, they introduced their own custom "black out" versions of the championship belts. The belts featured mostly the same basic design as the standard belts, but with silver plates instead of gold (the globe was also black instead of blue). The side plates were also changed to The House of Black's logos with a vertical "HOB" tooled into the leather between the outer side plates and the button snaps.

After The Acclaimed (Anthony Bowens, Max Caster, and Billy Gunn) won the title in August 2023, they introduced their own custom "scissoring" championship belts. They featured the same basic design as the standard belts, but with pink straps. Additionally, the ends of the belts were shaped like scissors and said "Scissor Me" on one side and "Daddy Ass" on the other side, referencing their "scissoring" gimmick. The inner side plates were the same as the standard belts, but the outer side plates were changed to saying "WORLD TRIOS CHAMPION". AEW's logo was also added to the top of each side plate.

During Dynasty: Zero Hour in April 2024, ROH World Six-Man Tag Team Champions Bullet Club Gold (Jay White, Austin Gunn, and Colten Gunn) defeated The Acclaimed to win the AEW World Trios Championship, holding and defending both titles under the Unified World Trios Championship banner, using the standard AEW Trios belts, the ROH World Six-Man belts, and The Acclaimed's custom "scissoring" belts to represent the collective accolade. This would continue until July 2024 when Bullet Club Gold (who had since become known as the Bang Bang Gang) were stripped of the Unified World Trios Championship. This subsequently ended the unification of the AEW and ROH titles with the custom "scissoring" belts also being dropped in favor of the standard AEW World Trios Championship belts.

== Reigns ==
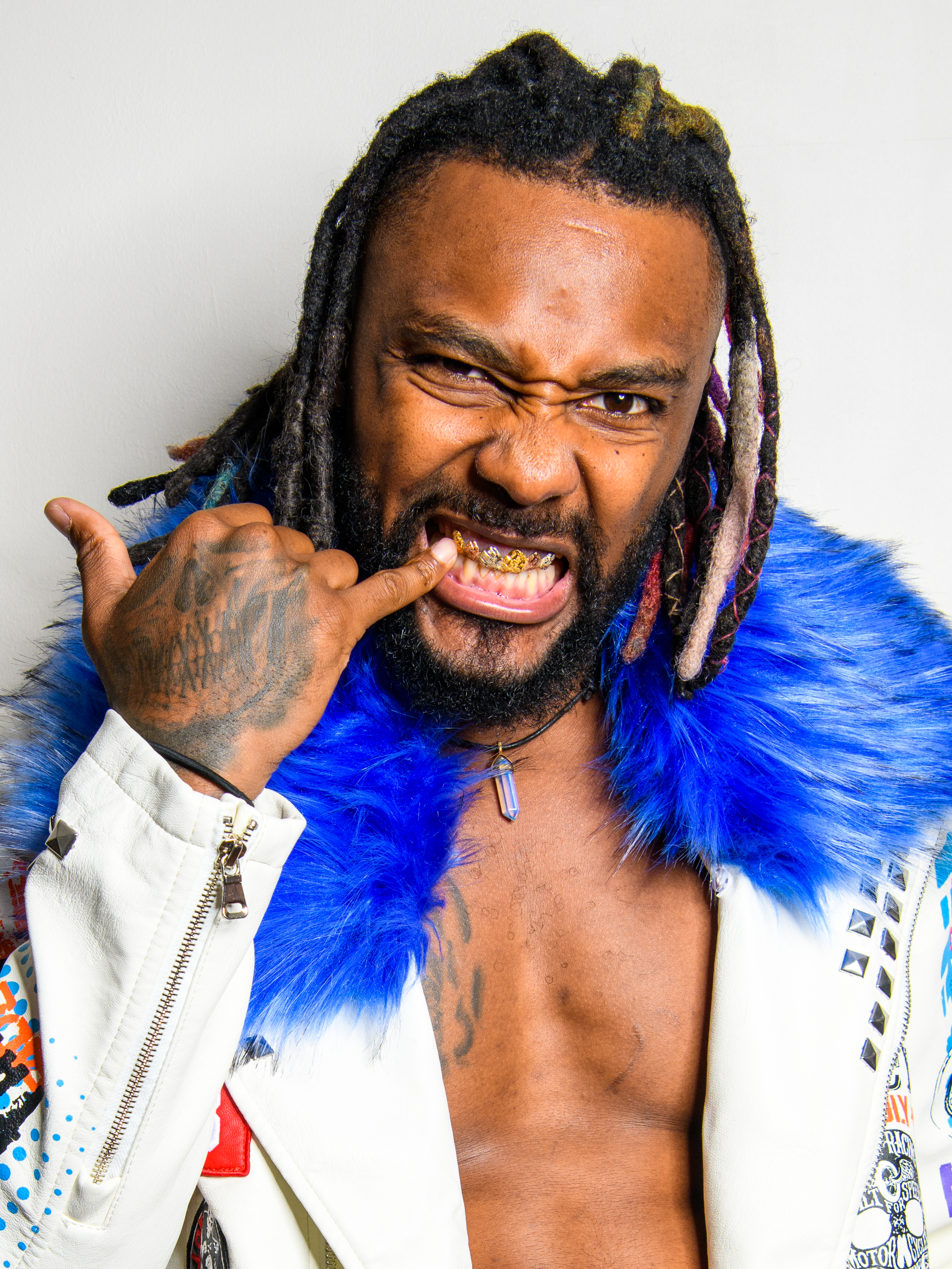
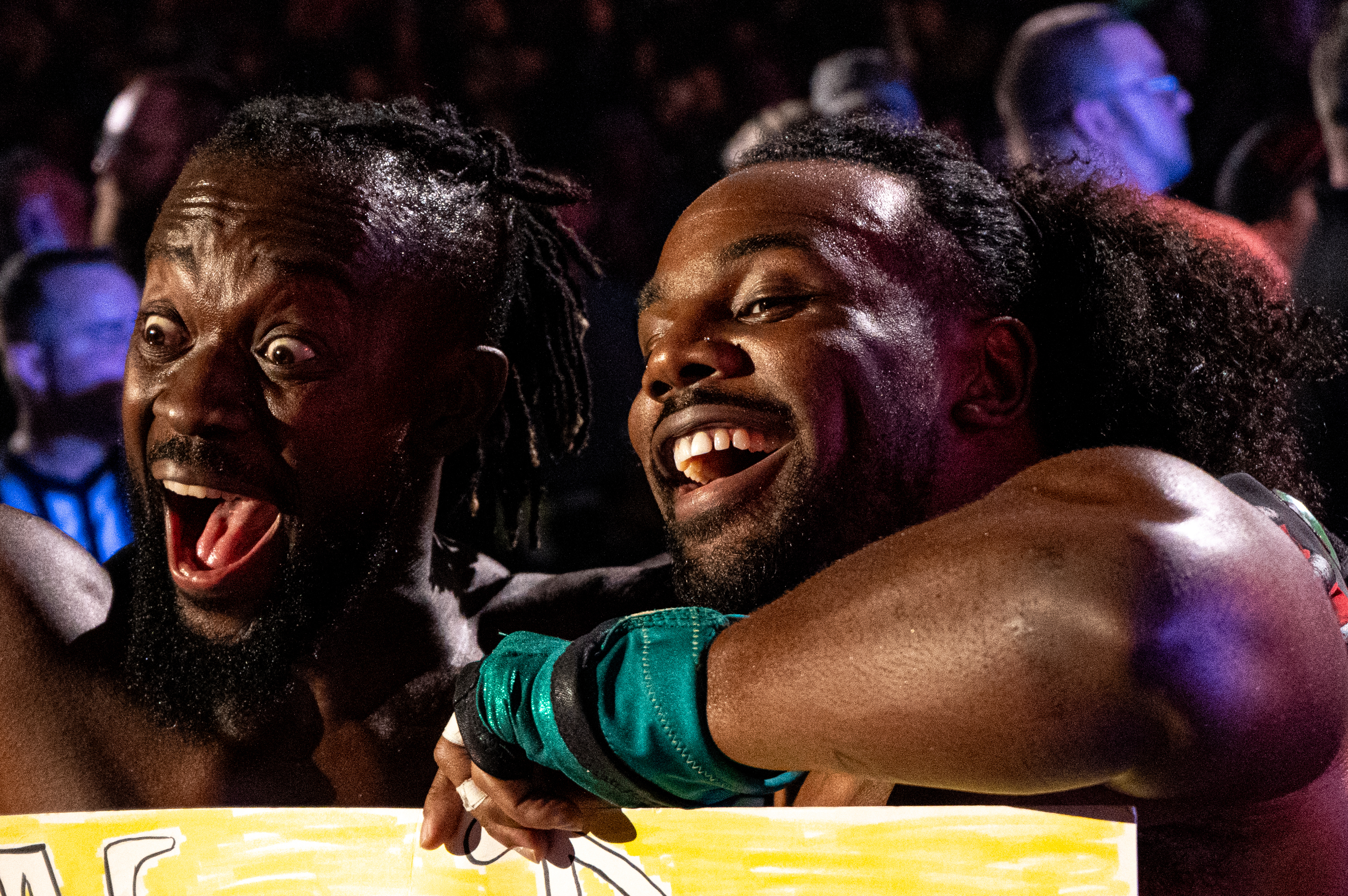
Current champions Swerve Strickland and The New Level (Kofi and Austin Creed), who are in their record-tying second reign as a team, while it is the respective second reign for each individually.

As of November 22, 2026, there have been 19 reigns between 16 teams composed of 43 individual champions, and two vacancies. The Elite (Kenny Omega, Matt Jackson, and Nick Jackson) were the inaugural champions. They are tied with the team of "Hangman" Adam Page and Brodido (Brody King and Bandido) and the team of Swerve Strickland and The New Level (Austin Creed and Kofi) for the most reigns as a team at two, while individually, Page and King are tied at three. At 274 days (276 days as recognized by AEW due to tape delay), The Opps's (Samoa Joe, Powerhouse Hobbs, and Katsuyori Shibata) sole reign is the longest in the title's history, both as a singular reign and for most cumulative days as champion for a team, while for an individual, Pac has the most cumulative days as champion, holding the title for 360 days across his two reigns. The Elite's inaugural reign is the shortest at three days, although AEW officially recognizes that The Dogs (Clark Connors, David Finlay, and Gabe Kidd) have the shortest reign at one day due to tape delay (their actual reign length was four days). Billy Gunn is the oldest champion, winning the title at 59, while Nick Wayne is the youngest at 19.

The current champions are Swerve Strickland and The New Level (Austin Creed and Kofi), who are in their record-tying second reign as a team, and second reign for each individually. They defeated "Hangman" Adam Page and Brodido (Brody King and Bandido) in a Texas Death match on November 14, 2026, at Full Gear in Phoenix, Arizona.
