= AEW Dynamite =

Professional wrestling television program

- AEW Dynamite logo (2024–present)
- Genre: Professional wrestling
- Created by: Tony Khan
- Presented by: Excalibur (play-by-play commentator); Tony Schiavone (color commentator); Taz (color commentator)
- Starring: AEW roster
- Opening theme: "You Wanted War" by Sum 41
- Country of origin: United States
- Original language: English
- No. of seasons: 6
- No. of episodes: 372

Production
- Camera setup: Multi-camera setup
- Running time: 120–150 minutes (including commercials) (Note: Dynamite is officially scheduled for two hours, but is generally afforded the ability to overrun its timeslot for creative reasons.)
- Production company: All Elite Wrestling

Original release
- Network: TNT
- Release: October 2, 2019 – December 29, 2021
- Network: TBS
- Release: January 5, 2022 – present
- Network: HBO Max
- Release: January 1, 2025 – present

Related
- AEW Collision; Ring of Honor Wrestling

AEW Dynamite, also known as Wednesday Night Dynamite or simply Dynamite, is an American professional wrestling television program produced by the American promotion All Elite Wrestling (AEW). It currently airs live every Wednesday at 8 p.m. Eastern Time (ET), with some rare exceptions, and is simulcast on TBS and the streaming service HBO Max. The program premiered on October 2, 2019, and is considered AEW's flagship program. It is one of the company's two weekly programs, along with its second main program, Saturday Night Collision. Dynamite is the first professional wrestling program to air on TBS since the final episode of WCW Thunder on March 21, 2001.

The program was originally broadcast on TBS's sister channel, TNT, from October 2, 2019, to December 29, 2021, before moving to TBS on January 5, 2022. Before its time on TBS, major sporting events would cause some episodes to air at a later time or on other nights. From June 2023 to December 2024, it was one of AEW's three television programs with the addition of Friday Night Rampage, which had premiered in August 2021 and ended in December 2024. Since January 1, 2025, the program has been simulcast on TBS and the streaming service HBO Max, airing live on the streaming platform regardless of the location from where the program is produced. On April 16, 2025, Dynamite produced its 289th episode and became the longest-running weekly professional wrestling show to air in prime time on a Turner network, surpassing WCW Monday Nitro.

== History ==
Members of the AEW roster such as Jon Moxley and Chris Jericho speaking in October 2019 about the creation of AEW Dynamite following the airing of the first episode

The American professional wrestling promotion All Elite Wrestling (AEW) was launched in January 2019. In addition to filing trademarks for the promotion's name, several other trademarks were filed at the time, including Tuesday Night Dynamite, presumably a name for a television show. In June 2019, AEW filed an additional trademark for Wednesday Night Dynamite, leading to many sources believing the show would air on Wednesday nights under this name.

On May 15, 2019, AEW and WarnerMedia announced a deal for a weekly prime-time show airing live on TNT, the former broadcaster of World Championship Wrestling (WCW). They would also stream live events and pay-per-views (PPV) on B/R Live in the United States and Canada. In April, veteran commentator Jim Ross confirmed the show would be a weekly two-hour show. During AEW's Fight for the Fallen event, AEW wrestler Chris Jericho revealed the show would begin airing in October. On July 24, AEW announced the show would premiere on Wednesday, October 2, and would broadcast from the Capital One Arena in Washington, D.C.; the show sold out within 3 hours of tickets going on sale. AEW President and Chief Executive Officer Tony Khan said that they chose to air the show on Wednesday nights instead of Tuesday nights because TNT airs the National Basketball Association (NBA) on Tuesday and Thursday nights, and to prevent counter-programming against the National Football League (NFL)'s Thursday Night Football, as the Khan family also owns the Jacksonville Jaguars NFL team.

In August 2019, WWE announced that it was moving their WWE Network show NXT to the USA Network and expanding the program to a live, two-hour broadcast in the same timeslot as AEW's upcoming show. NXT premiered on USA on September 18, two weeks before AEW's broadcast debut on TNT. On August 30, the day before AEW's PPV All Out, TNT aired a one-hour special called Countdown to All Out at 10pm Eastern Time (ET), which averaged 390,000 viewers.

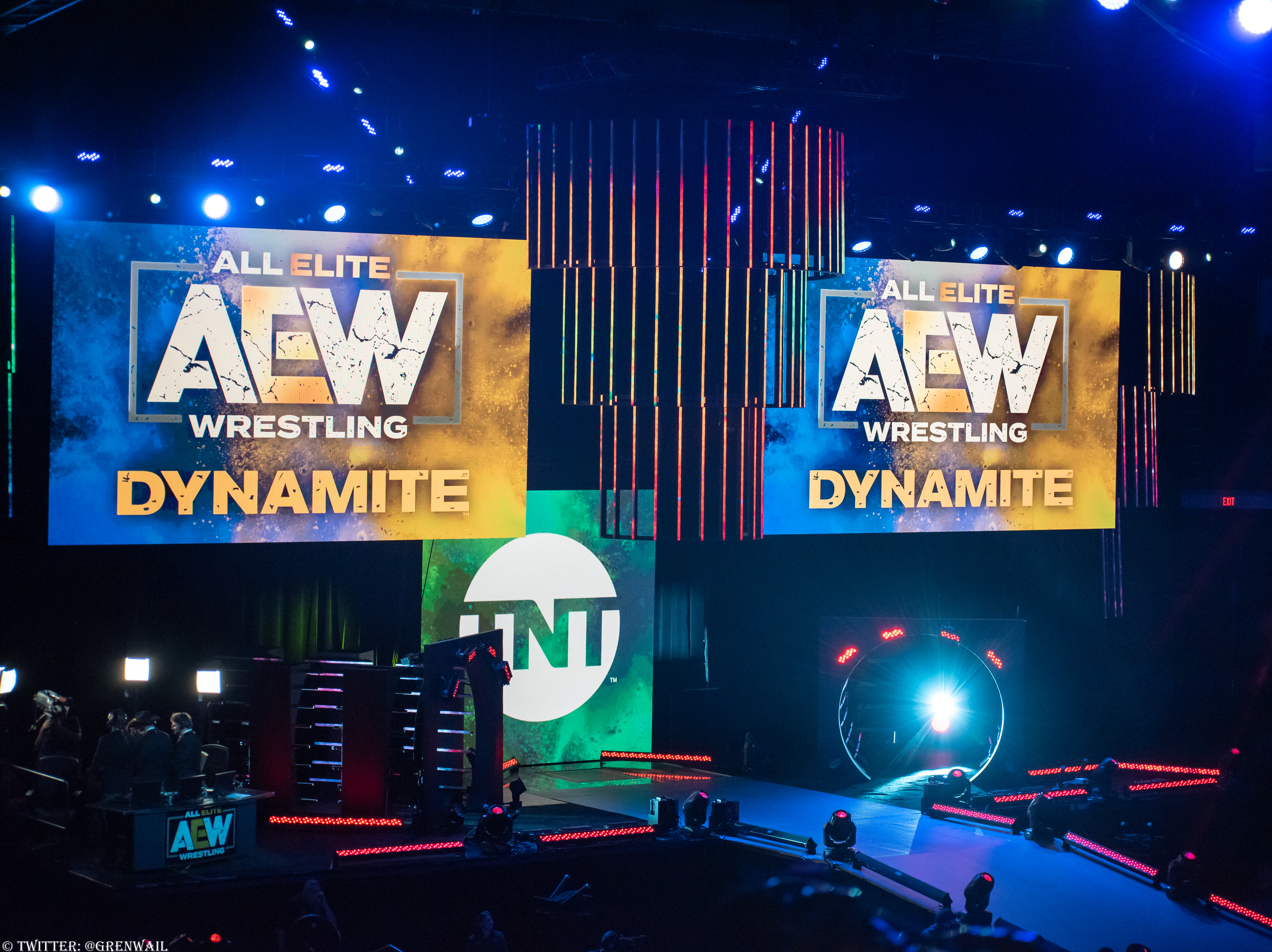
The standard Dynamite set used from October 2, 2019, to December 28, 2022. It had also been used by its sister shows Rampage, Battle of the Belts, and some of its pay-per-view events. Dynamite utilized a different set when Rampage was held in a different city or when the arena was not standard size. This set design returned for Dynamite's 200th episode on August 2, 2023.

Like they had done for each of their PPV events, AEW began a "Road to" YouTube series on September 4 entitled The Road to AEW on TNT to build anticipation for the debut broadcast of the show. On September 19, 2019, the show's name was revealed as Dynamite. A two-hour preview show called Countdown to All Elite Wrestling: Dynamite aired on October 1 at 8pm ET; it averaged 631,000 viewers.

On October 2, 2019, Dynamite debuted on TNT which averaged 1.409 million viewers, which made it the largest television debut on TNT in the past five years. Also on October 2, NXT would make their two-hour debut on USA Network (the previous two episodes featured the first hour on USA with the second hour on the WWE Network), and they averaged 891,000 viewers. Dynamite beat out NXT in viewership and more than doubled its competition in the key adults 18–49 demographic, scoring 878,000 viewers compared to NXT's 414,000. This would also mark the beginning of the "Wednesday Night Wars". Prior to and after the episode, dark matches were filmed to air on AEW's YouTube show called Dark, which began airing on the following Tuesday (except before PPV events, where the episodes aired Fridays). Despite AEW's initial attempts to avoid conflicts with the NBA games, AEW had to run Dynamite on Thursdays, and even on a Saturday, due to the NBA playoffs. Dynamite was the first wrestling show to air on TNT since the final episode of WCW Monday Nitro on March 26, 2001.

Due to the COVID-19 pandemic that began in March 2020, which caused restrictions for live events around the world, AEW ran empty arena shows from March 18–25 and again from May 6–August 19 from Daily's Place in Jacksonville, Florida, and taped six weeks of shows from March 31 to April 2 from the Nightmare Factory in Norcross, Georgia, AEW's de facto training facility. During these broadcasts, AEW used their employees and other in-ring talent to serve as the live audience for matches when they were not involved in matches or other on-air segments. AEW later began allowing more family and friends of essential personnel to attend, and on August 27, 2020 (moved to Thursday because of the NBA playoffs), AEW resumed live audiences from Daily's Place, though to a limited capacity of 10–15% of the venue. During the pandemic, in order to allow more time off, AEW often taped two weeks of shows in two days (live Wednesday, then a taping Thursday), which allowed wrestlers a week off. This procedure also allowed AEW to pre-tape Thanksgiving and Christmas shows in advance using the format. AEW then began running shows at full capacity of Daily's Place in May 2021. Also in May, AEW announced that they would be returning to live touring, beginning with a special episode of Dynamite titled Road Rager on July 7, in turn becoming the first major professional wrestling promotion to resume live touring during the pandemic. Road Rager was also the first in a four-week span of special Dynamite episodes called the "Welcome Back" tour, which continued with the two-part Fyter Fest on July 14 and 21 and concluded with Fight for the Fallen on July 28.

In regard to the addition of Rampage on TNT in August 2021, WarnerMedia had asked Khan if he would rather expand Dynamite to three hours, but he rejected the notion, stating that he did not want to run Dynamite for that length as he really wanted that third hour as a separate show on a different night. He also claimed that Rampage would not be a secondary show to Dynamite, and that it would be its partner or its equivalent. He further said that Dynamite and Rampage would be AEW's core properties, while their YouTube shows, Dark and Elevation, would be their peripheral properties, essentially their developmental programs.

It was announced on October 25, 2021, that Dynamite would start airing live from coast to coast starting with the October 27 episode (the show's return to Wednesday nights after two weeks due to TNT's coverage of the NHL). This lasted until Dynamite's move to TBS.

On January 5, 2022, Dynamite moved from TNT to TBS, marking the first professional wrestling program to air on TBS since 2001.

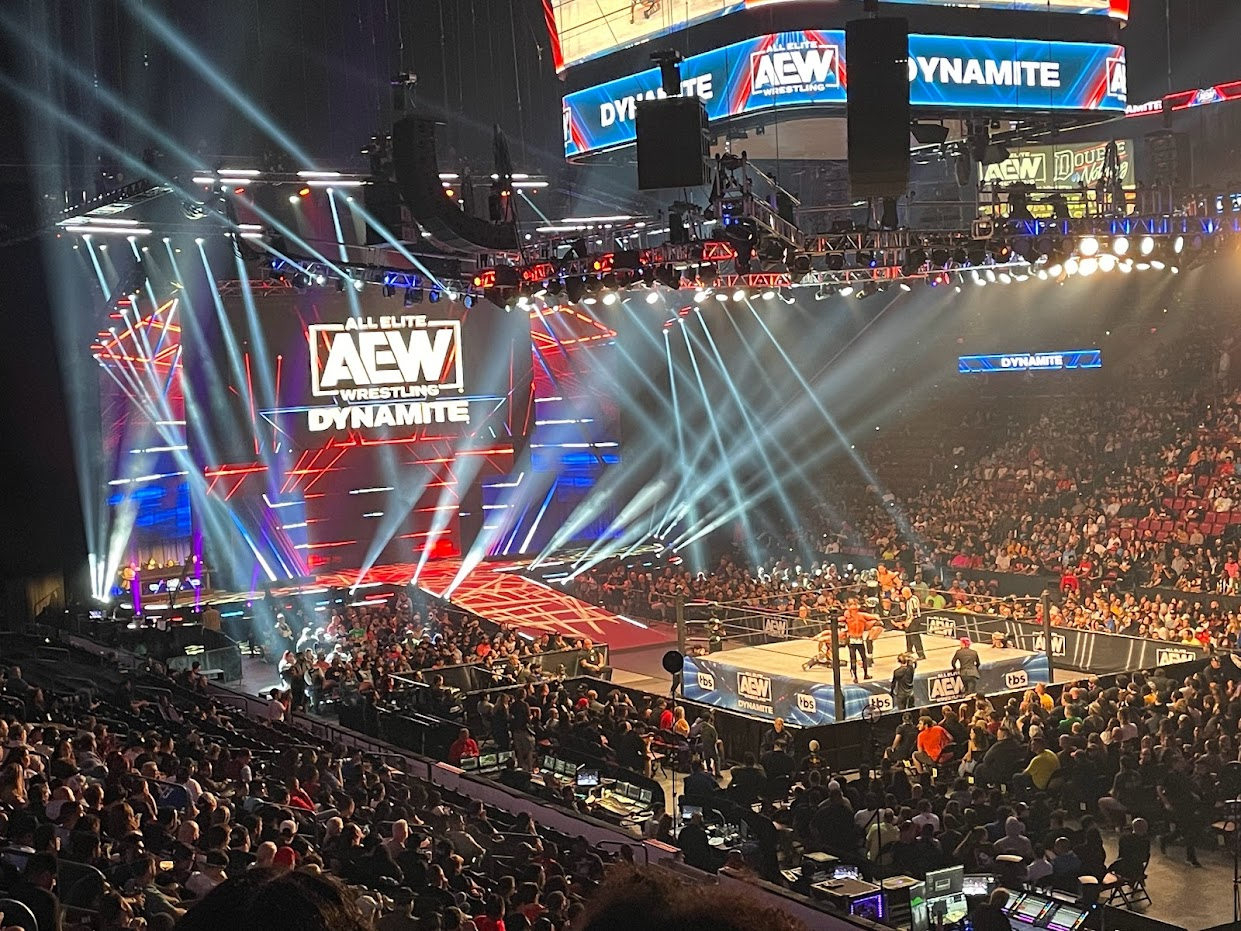
The Dynamite set used from January 4, 2023, to February 28, 2024. This set had also been used for Rampage and Battle of the Belts.

In May 2023, AEW confirmed another television program, Collision, to premiere that June on TNT (Dark and Elevation were also canceled, with Rampage shifting to featuring developing talent). Prior to Collision's official announcement, it had been speculated that with the addition of Collision, AEW would do some form of a roster split, similar to WWE's brand extension, in which part of the roster would only perform on Dynamite, while the other part would be on Collision. In an appearance on the Barstool Sports Rasslin' podcast with Brandon Walker on June 13, Khan said that there would not be a hard split where wrestlers would exclusively appear on only one program. Instead, he said some wrestlers would be featured on certain shows, but there could be opportunities for storylines to cross between them. He also confirmed that the title holders would be the champions for all of AEW's programs.

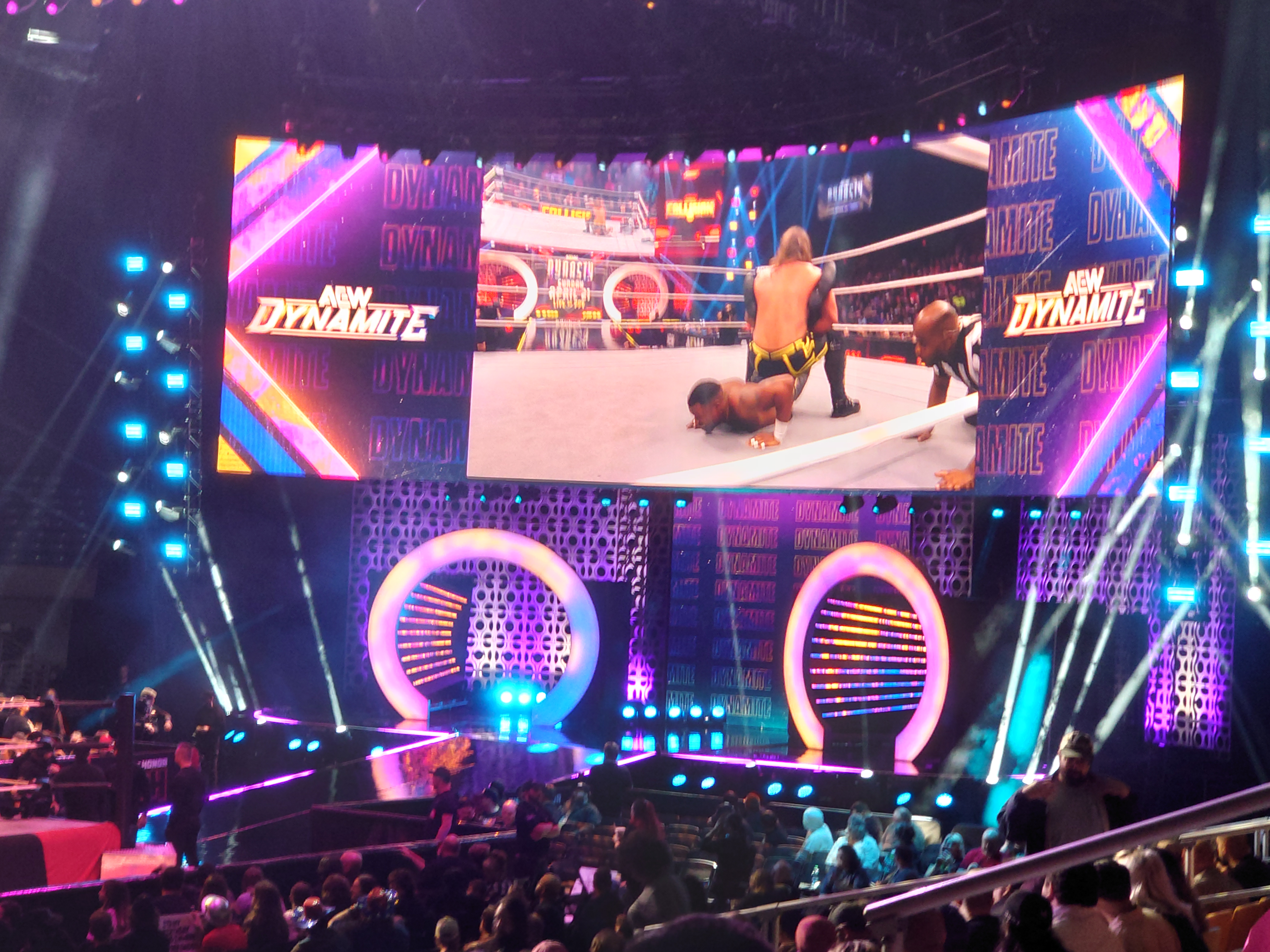
The Dynamite set used since March 6, 2024. This is also used for Collision and Ring of Honor Wrestling, and was also used for Rampage until its cancellation.

On March 23, 2025, AEW announced a special episode of Dynamite titled Spring BreakThru, scheduled for April 16, 2025, at the MGM Music Hall at Fenway in Boston, Massachusetts. This will be the 289th episode of Dynamite, making it the longest-running prime time weekly pro-wrestling program in Turner Sports history, surpassing WCW Monday Nitro, which had a total of 288 episodes that aired on TNT from September 1995 to March 2001.

== Roster ==
The wrestlers featured on All Elite Wrestling take part in scripted feuds and storylines. Wrestlers are portrayed as heroes, villains, or less distinguishable characters in scripted events that build tension and culminate in a wrestling match.

The primary commentators for AEW Dynamite are Excalibur, Tony Schiavone, and Taz. Additional commentary has been provided by Jim Ross, Don Callis, Nigel McGuinness, Bryan Danielson and others since its creation.

== Production ==
=== Theme music ===
Song	Artist	Dates
"Dynamite"	No One Hero	October 2, 2019 – February 28, 2024
"Pop"	Mikey Rukus	March 6, 2024 – April 30, 2025
"I'm So Excited"	The Pointer Sisters	January 1, 2025
"You Wanted War"	Sum 41	May 7, 2025 – present

== Broadcasting ==
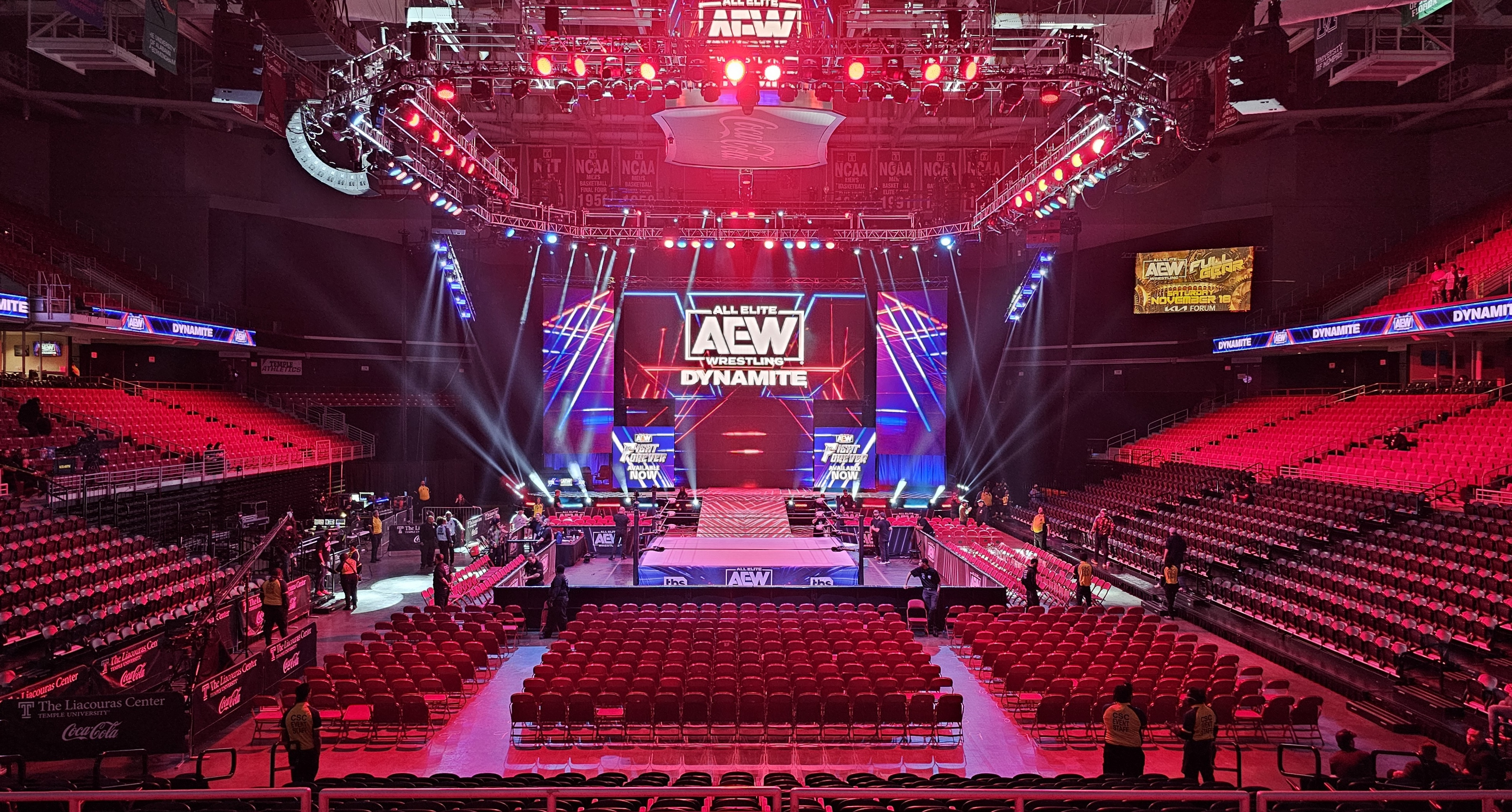
The set prior to filming at the Liacouras Center in Philadelphia, October 25, 2023

In the United States, Dynamite airs live Wednesdays on TBS at 8pm ET. On January 15, 2020, it was announced that WarnerMedia had extended the contract for the series through 2023. The show originally aired on TBS's sister channel, TNT, from October 2019 to December 2021. On October 2, 2024, the fifth year anniversary of the first ever Dynamite, AEW and Warner Bros. Discovery (formerly WarnerMedia) announced a multi-year media rights extension, where Dynamite would be simulcast on TBS and WBD's streaming platform Max, beginning on January 1, 2025, with the Fight for the Fallen special.

On September 25, 2019, AEW announced an international streaming deal with FITE TV, now TrillerTV, primarily for regions outside of the United States and Canada via the "AEW Plus" package, which included live streaming and replay access of Dynamite in simulcast with its U.S. airing. AEW Plus was discontinued on May 20, 2026, Dynamite now instead airs on AEW's own service, MyAEW.

=== Canada ===
In Canada, Bell Media's TSN acquired broadcast rights to Dynamite, marking the return of professional wrestling to the network after WWE Raw moved to rival network The Score (now Sportsnet 360) in 2006. The show is broadcast in simulcast with TNT in the U.S. (but is subject to scheduling) and is streamed on TSN Direct as well as TSN's website. Starting August 24, 2022, Dynamite would also air in French on Réseau des sports (RDS). On December 30, 2022, AEW would stop airing on Réseau des sports (RDS) due to the network's budget constraints.

=== Europe ===
In the United Kingdom, AEW has a deal with ITV plc to broadcast AEW programming, with Dynamite airing on ITV4 every Friday night, with repeats every Saturday night. ITV1 previously aired repeats on Monday nights until April 2024. ITV1 aired repeats of Dynamite during the 2026 World Cup season from June to July 2026. It is also available to view on their streaming service ITVX.

On October 22, 2019, TNT Serie announced a deal to air Dynamite on Friday nights in Germany. On October 24, 2019, Toonami (since rebranded as Warner TV Next) announced a deal to air Dynamite on Tuesday nights in France. On July 21, 2020, Sky Sport and AEW announced a deal to air Dynamite on Friday nights in Italy, replacing WWE programming. AEW also aired on Sport Extra in Romania from 2020 until 2022. Dynamite aired in Poland from March 5 until August 27, 2022 on Warner TV. In Spain, AEW announced that was going to air Dynamite on TNT starting on June 17, 2022, and later live from June 19, 2022. As of 2023, in some European markets (including countries like Portugal, Sweden, Poland, Turkey, Romania and Czech Republic), Dynamite (and other AEW events such as PPVs, Rampage, Dark, Elevation and Battle of the Belts) are available on DAZN.

=== Latin America ===
On October 22, 2020, AEW reached an agreement with the digital platform with Pluto TV broadcasting its repeat events (including past pay-per-view) with commentators in Spanish from Latin America.

On November 22, 2020, Dynamite began airing on Space, a WarnerMedia International channel in Brazil and on Space's Spanish feed, available throughout Latin America on Sundays. On September 30, 2022, it was announced that AEW would stop airing on Space in Latin America on October 1, with Brazil following on December 30. Currently, AEW Dynamite (alongside the rest of AEW programming) is aired by Televisa-Univision, on TUDN in Mexico and on ViX streaming Platform in the rest of Latin America and the Caribbean.

=== Africa ===
Dynamite began airing on TNT Africa on February 5, 2021, in English-speaking countries of Sub-Saharan Africa. The show airs every Sunday morning at 10 AM CAT, four days after the U.S. broadcast.

=== Asia ===
In India, AEW is announced to be airing Dynamite on Eurosport starting on August 15, 2021, and later live from August 19, 2021, every Thursday on 5:30am IST. Dynamite began airing on Premier Sports in the Philippines on September 25, 2021. On April 8, 2022, it was announced that as part of the AEW and NJPW working relationship that Dynamite would air in Japan on NJPW World.

=== Oceania ===
Dynamite started airing on ESPN2 from February 16, 2023 in Australia, New Zealand, Fiji, Samoa, Tonga, Cook Islands, Solomon Islands, Niue, Nauru, Vanuatu, Kiribati, Northern Marianas, Tokelau, Tahiti, Tuvalu, New Caledonia, American Samoa, Marshall Islands, Palau, Federated States of Micronesia, Papua New Guinea, and Wallis and Futuna.

== Broadcast history ==
Channel	Timeslot	Years
TNT	Wednesday 8–10 p.m. ET	October 2, 2019 – December 29, 2021
TBS	Wednesday 8–10 p.m. ET	January 5, 2022 – present
HBO Max	Wednesday 8–10 p.m. ET	January 1, 2025 – present

== See also ==
- List of All Elite Wrestling special events
- List of professional wrestling television series
- AEW Dynamite Diamond Ring
