= List of AEW World Trios Champions =

The AEW World Trios Championship is a men's professional wrestling world tag team championship created and promoted by All Elite Wrestling (AEW). It is a specialized tag team championship, being contested by teams of three wrestlers, referred to as trios.

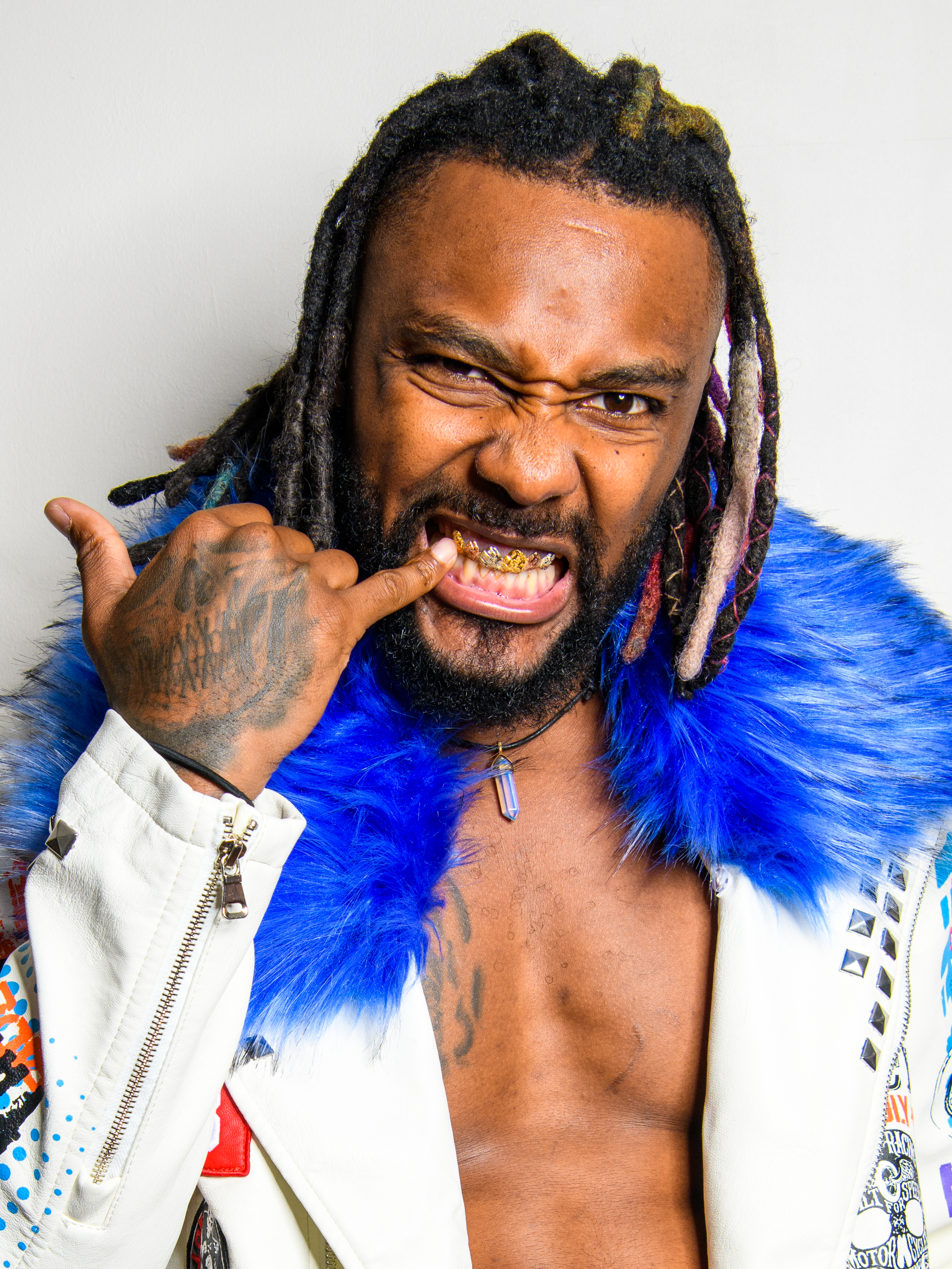
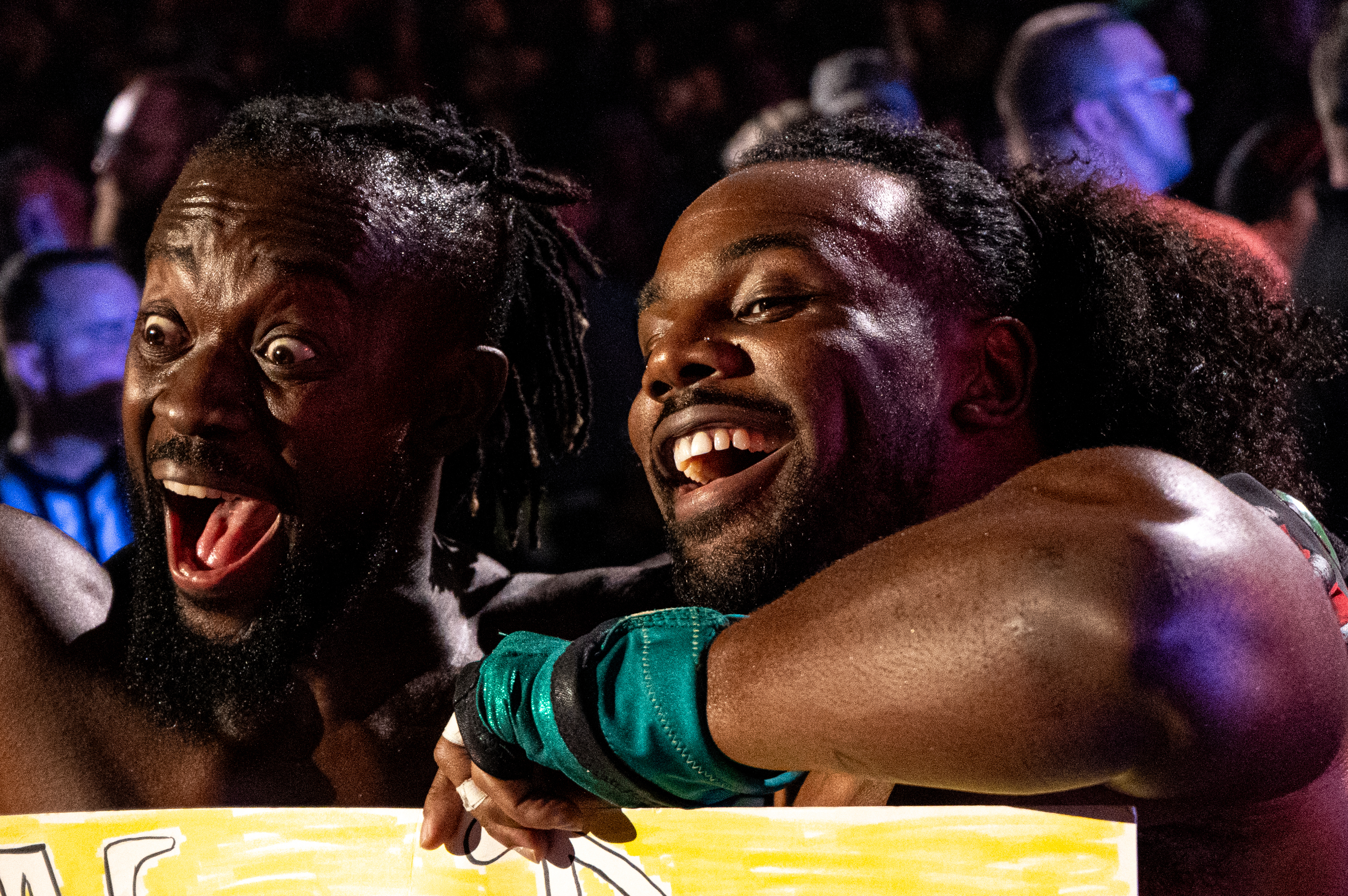
Current champions Swerve Strickland and The New Level (Kofi and Austin Creed), who are in their record-tying second reign as a team, while it is the respective second reign for each individually.

As of November 22, 2026, there have been 19 reigns between 16 teams composed of 43 individual champions, and two vacancies. The Elite (Kenny Omega, Matt Jackson, and Nick Jackson) were the inaugural champions. They are tied with the team of "Hangman" Adam Page and Brodido (Brody King and Bandido) and the team of Swerve Strickland and The New Level (Austin Creed and Kofi) for the most reigns as a team at two, while individually, Page and King are tied at three. At 274 days (276 days as recognized by AEW due to tape delay), The Opps's (Samoa Joe, Powerhouse Hobbs, and Katsuyori Shibata) sole reign is the longest in the title's history, both as a singular reign and for most cumulative days as champion for a team, while for an individual, Pac has the most cumulative days as champion, holding the title for 360 days across his two reigns. The Elite's inaugural reign is the shortest at three days, although AEW officially recognizes that The Dogs (Clark Connors, David Finlay, and Gabe Kidd) have the shortest reign at one day due to tape delay (their actual reign length was four days). Billy Gunn is the oldest champion, winning the title at 59, while Nick Wayne is the youngest at 19.

The current champions are Swerve Strickland and The New Level (Austin Creed and Kofi), who are in their record-tying second reign as a team, while it is the respective second reign for each individually. They defeated "Hangman" Adam Page and Brodido (Brody King and Bandido) in a Texas Death match on November 14, 2026, at Full Gear in Phoenix, Arizona.

== Title history ==
Name	Years
AEW World Trios Championship	September 4, 2022 – present
Unified World Trios Championship	April 21, 2024 – July 13, 2024

Key
No.	Overall reign number
Reign	Reign number for the specific team—reign numbers for the individuals are in parentheses, if different
Days	Number of days held
Days recog.	Number of days held recognized by the promotion
+	Current reign is changing daily

No.	Champion	Championship change			Reign statistics			Notes	Ref.
No.	Champion	Date	Event	Location	Reign	Days	Days recog.	Notes	Ref.
1	The Elite (Kenny Omega, Matt Jackson, and Nick Jackson)	September 4, 2022	All Out	Hoffman Estates, IL	1	3	3	Defeated "Hangman" Adam Page and The Dark Order (Alex Reynolds and John Silver) in a tournament final to determine the inaugural champions.	
—	Vacated	September 7, 2022	Dynamite	Buffalo, NY	—	—	—	The Elite were stripped of the title after being suspended by AEW president Tony Khan following a legitimate backstage physical altercation with CM Punk and Ace Steel that occurred during the All Out post-event media scrum.	
2	Death Triangle (Pac, Penta El Zero M, and Rey Fénix)	September 7, 2022	Dynamite	Buffalo, NY	1	126	126	Defeated Best Friends (Chuck Taylor, Trent Beretta, and Orange Cassidy) to win the vacant championship.	
3	The Elite (Kenny Omega, Matt Jackson, and Nick Jackson)	January 11, 2023	Dynamite	Inglewood, CA	2	53	53	This was an Escalera de la Muerte that was also the seventh and final match in a Best of Seven Series for the championship.	
4	House of Black (Malakai Black, Brody King, and Buddy Matthews)	March 5, 2023	Revolution	San Francisco, CA	1	175	175		
5	The Acclaimed (Anthony Bowens, Max Caster, and Billy Gunn)	August 27, 2023	All In	London, England	1	238	238	This was a "House Rules match"; The Acclaimed's stipulation was No Holds Barred.	
6	Bullet Club Gold/Bang Bang Gang (Jay White, Austin Gunn, and Colten Gunn)	April 21, 2024	Dynasty; Zero Hour	St. Louis, MO	1	80	83	This was a Winners Take All Title Unification match also for Bullet Club Gold's ROH World Six-Man Tag Team Championship. With both titles, Bullet Club Gold were referred to as the Unified World Trios Champions and during this reign, the group was renamed to Bang Bang Gang. AEW recognizes this reign as ending on July 13, 2024, when the following episode aired on tape delay.	
—	Vacated	July 10, 2024	Collision	Calgary, AB, Canada	—	—	—	Bang Bang Gang were stripped of the Unified World Trios Championship by interim AEW Executive Vice President Christopher Daniels after Jay White suffered an injury, overruling Bang Bang Gang's attempt to invoke the Freebird Rule to allow Juice Robinson to defend the title in place of White. This subsequently ended the unification with the ROH World Six-Man Tag Team Championship. This episode aired on tape delay on July 13, 2024.	
7	The Patriarchy (Christian Cage, Killswitch, and Nick Wayne)	July 20, 2024	Collision	Arlington, TX	1	36	36	Defeated Bang Bang Gang (Juice Robinson, Austin Gunn, and Colten Gunn) to win the vacant championship.	
8	Blackpool Combat Club/Death Riders (Claudio Castagnoli, Pac, and Wheeler Yuta)	August 25, 2024	All In	London, England	1 (1, 2, 1)	234	234	This was a four-way London Ladder match also involving Bang Bang Gang (Juice Robinson, Austin Gunn, and Colten Gunn) and House of Black (Malakai Black, Brody King, and Buddy Matthews). During this reign on November 6, Blackpool Combat Club was renamed to Death Riders.	
9	The Opps (Samoa Joe, Powerhouse Hobbs, and Katsuyori Shibata)	April 16, 2025	Dynamite: Spring BreakThru	Boston, MA	1	273	276	Jon Moxley filled in as substitute for the Death Riders in place of a legitimately injured Pac. AEW recognizes this reign as ending on January 17, 2026, when the episode aired on tape delay.	
10	Jet Set Rodeo ("Hangman" Adam Page, Kevin Knight, and Mike Bailey)	January 14, 2026	Collision: Maximum Carnage	Phoenix, AZ	1	49	46	AEW recognizes this reign as beginning on January 17, 2026, when the episode aired on tape delay.	
11	Don Callis Family (Kazuchika Okada, Kyle Fletcher, and Mark Davis)	March 4, 2026	Dynamite	El Paso, TX	1	11	11		
12	Místico and JetSpeed (Kevin Knight and Mike Bailey)	March 15, 2026	Revolution	Los Angeles, CA	1 (1, 2, 2)	24	27		
13	The Dogs (Clark Connors, David Finlay, and Gabe Kidd)	April 8, 2026	Collision	Edmonton, AB, Canada	1	4	1	AEW recognizes this reign as beginning on April 11, 2026, when the episode aired on tape delay.	
14	The Conglomeration (Kyle O'Reilly, Orange Cassidy, and Roderick Strong)	April 12, 2026	Dynasty	Vancouver, BC, Canada	1	108	108		
15	The Demand (Ricochet, Bishop Kaun, and Toa Liona)	July 29, 2026	Dynamite	Detroit, MI	1	7	7		
16	"Hangman" Adam Page and Brodido (Brody King and Bandido)	August 5, 2026	Dynamite: Grand Slam Mexico	Mexico City, Mexico	1 (2, 2, 1)	25	25		
17	Swerve Strickland and The New Level (Austin Creed and Kofi)	August 30, 2026	All In	London, England	1	48	48	This was a seven-team Trios Roulette Royale in which Strickland and New Level lastly eliminated Gabe Kidd and the Death Riders (Claudio Castagnoli and Pac) simultaneously to win. The match started on the Buy in pre-show and concluded after the start of the pay-per-view.	
18	"Hangman" Adam Page and Brodido (Brody King and Bandido)	October 17, 2026	WrestleDream	Orlando, Florida	2 (3, 3, 2)	28	28	This was a two out of three falls match, won by 2–1.	
19	Swerve Strickland and The New Level (Austin Creed and Kofi)	November 14, 2026	Full Gear	Phoenix, Arizona	2	8+	8+	This was a Texas Deathmatch.	

== Combined reigns ==
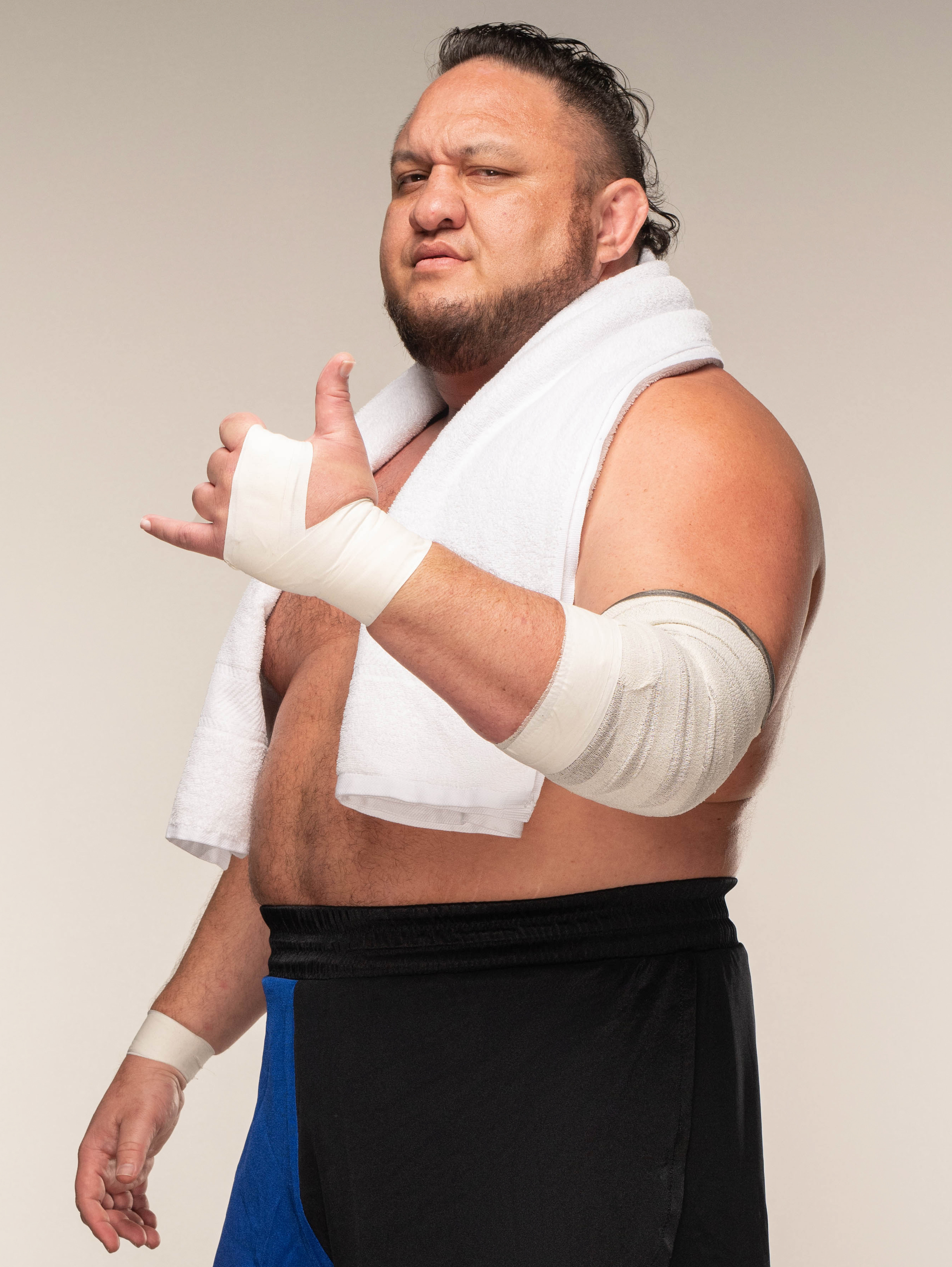
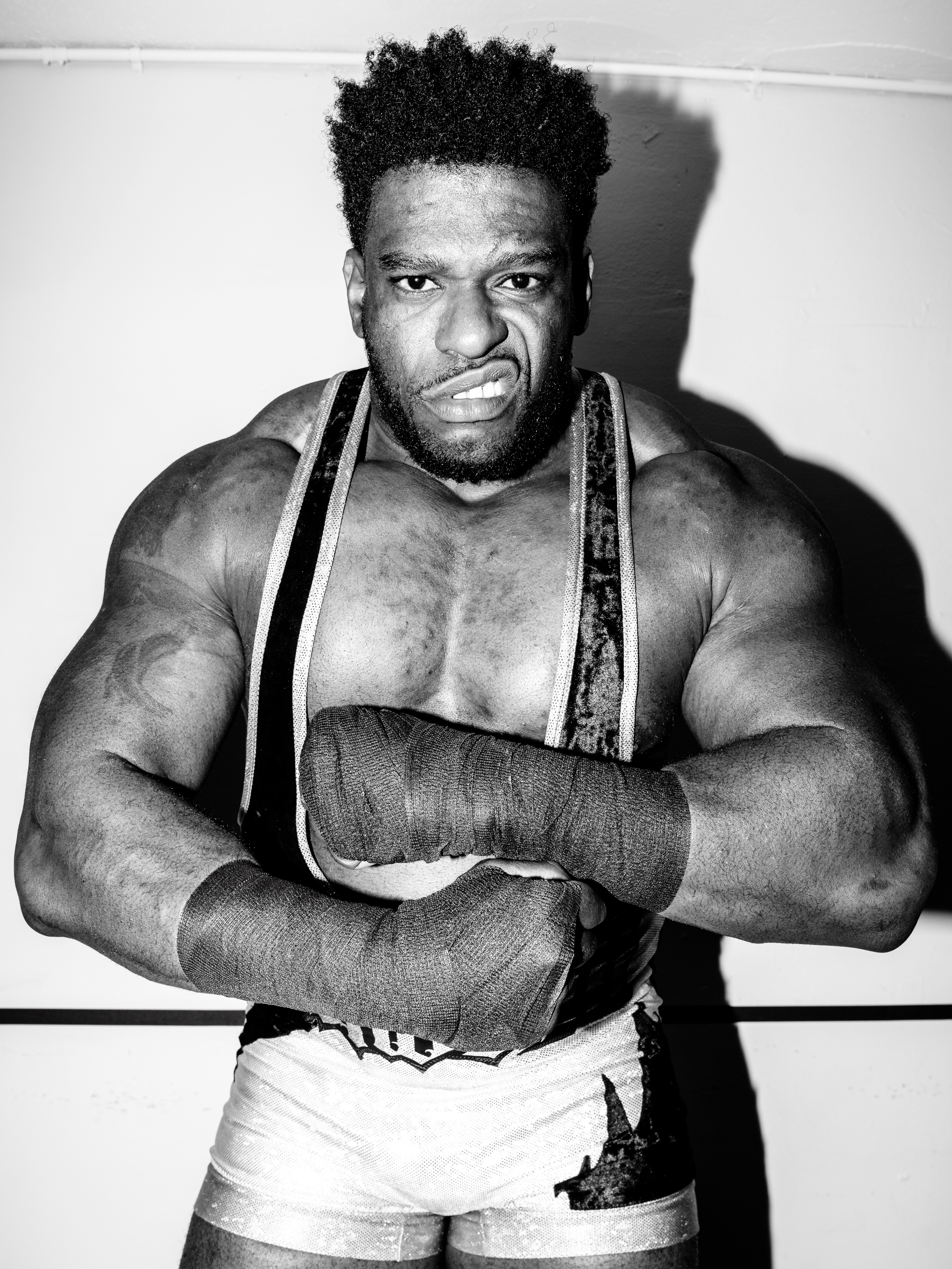
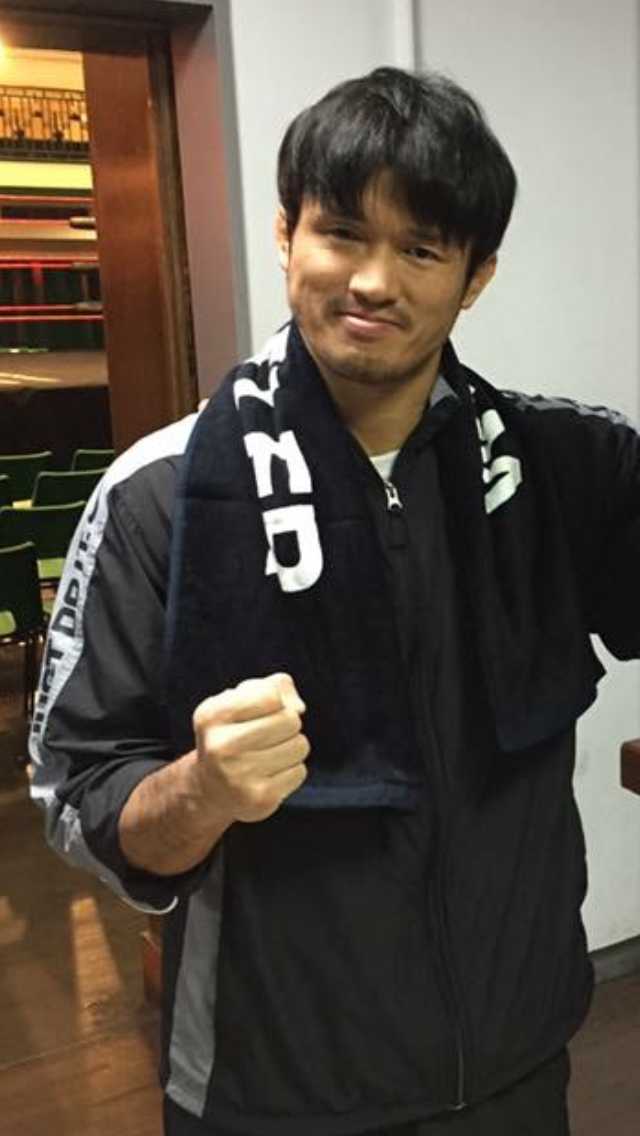
As a team, The Opps (Samoa Joe, Powerhouse Hobbs, and Katsuyori Shibata) have the longest singular reign and most cumulative days as champion at a record-setting 273 days (276 days as recognized by AEW due to tape delay).

As of November 22, 2026.

†	Indicates the current champion

=== By team ===
Rank	Team	No. of reigns	Combined days	Combined days rec. by AEW
1	The Opps (Samoa Joe, Powerhouse Hobbs, and Katsuyori Shibata)	1	273	276
2	The Acclaimed (Anthony Bowens, Max Caster, and Billy Gunn)	1	238	
3	Blackpool Combat Club/Death Riders (Claudio Castagnoli, Pac, and Wheeler Yuta)	1	234	
4	House of Black (Malakai Black, Brody King, and Buddy Matthews)	1	175	
5	Death Triangle (Pac, Penta El Zero M, and Rey Fénix)	1	126	
6	The Conglomeration (Kyle O'Reilly, Orange Cassidy, and Roderick Strong)	1	108	
7	Bullet Club Gold/Bang Bang Gang (Jay White, Austin Gunn, and Colten Gunn)	1	80	83
8	Swerve Strickland and The New Level † (Austin Creed and Kofi)	2	56+	
9	The Elite (Kenny Omega, Matt Jackson, and Nick Jackson)	2	56	
10	"Hangman" Adam Page and Brodido (Brody King and Bandido)	2	53	
11	Jet Set Rodeo ("Hangman" Adam Page, Kevin Knight, and Mike Bailey)	1	49	46
12	The Patriarchy (Christian Cage, Killswitch, and Nick Wayne)	1	36	
13	Místico and JetSpeed (Kevin Knight and Mike Bailey)	1	25	27
14	The Don Callis Family (Kazuchika Okada, Kyle Fletcher, and Mark Davis)	1	11	
15	The Demand (Ricochet, Bishop Kaun, and Toa Liona)	1	7	
16	The Dogs (Clark Connors, David Finlay, and Gabe Kidd)	1	4	1

=== By wrestler ===
As an individual, Pac holds the record for longest combined days as champion at 360 days over two reigns; shown here with the AEW World Trios Championship (over his right shoulder) and the AEW All-Atlantic Championship (over his left shoulder).

Rank	Wrestler	No. of reigns	Combined days	Combined days rec. by AEW
1	Pac	2	360	
2	Katsuyori Shibata	1	273	276
2	Powerhouse Hobbs	1	273	276
2	Samoa Joe	1	273	276
5	Anthony Bowens	1	238	
5	Billy Gunn	1	238	
5	Max Caster	1	238	
8	Claudio Castagnoli	1	234	
8	Wheeler Yuta	1	234	
10	Brody King	3	229	
11	Buddy Matthews	1	175	
11	Malakai Black	1	175	
13	Penta El Zero Miedo	1	126	
13	Rey Fénix	1	126	
15	Kyle O'Reilly	1	108	
15	Orange Cassidy	1	108	
15	Roderick Strong	1	108	
18	"Hangman" Adam Page	3	103	100
19	Austin Gunn	1	80	83
19	Colten Gunn	1	80	83
19	Jay White	1	80	83
22	Kevin Knight	2	74	73
22	Mike Bailey	2	74	73
24	Swerve Strickland †	2	56+	
24	Austin Creed †	2	56+	
24	Kofi †	2	56+	
27	Kenny Omega	2	56	
27	Matt Jackson	2	56	
27	Nick Jackson	2	56	
30	Bandido	2	54	
31	Christian Cage	1	36	
31	Killswitch	1	36	
31	Nick Wayne	1	36	
34	Místico	1	25	
35	Kazuchika Okada	1	11	
35	Kyle Fletcher	1	11	
35	Mark Davis	1	11	
38	Ricochet	1	7	
38	Bishop Kaun	1	7	
38	Toa Liona	1	7	
41	David Finlay	1	4	1
41	Clark Connors	1	4	1
41	Gabe Kidd	1	4	1
