= The Gunns =

Professional wrestling tag team

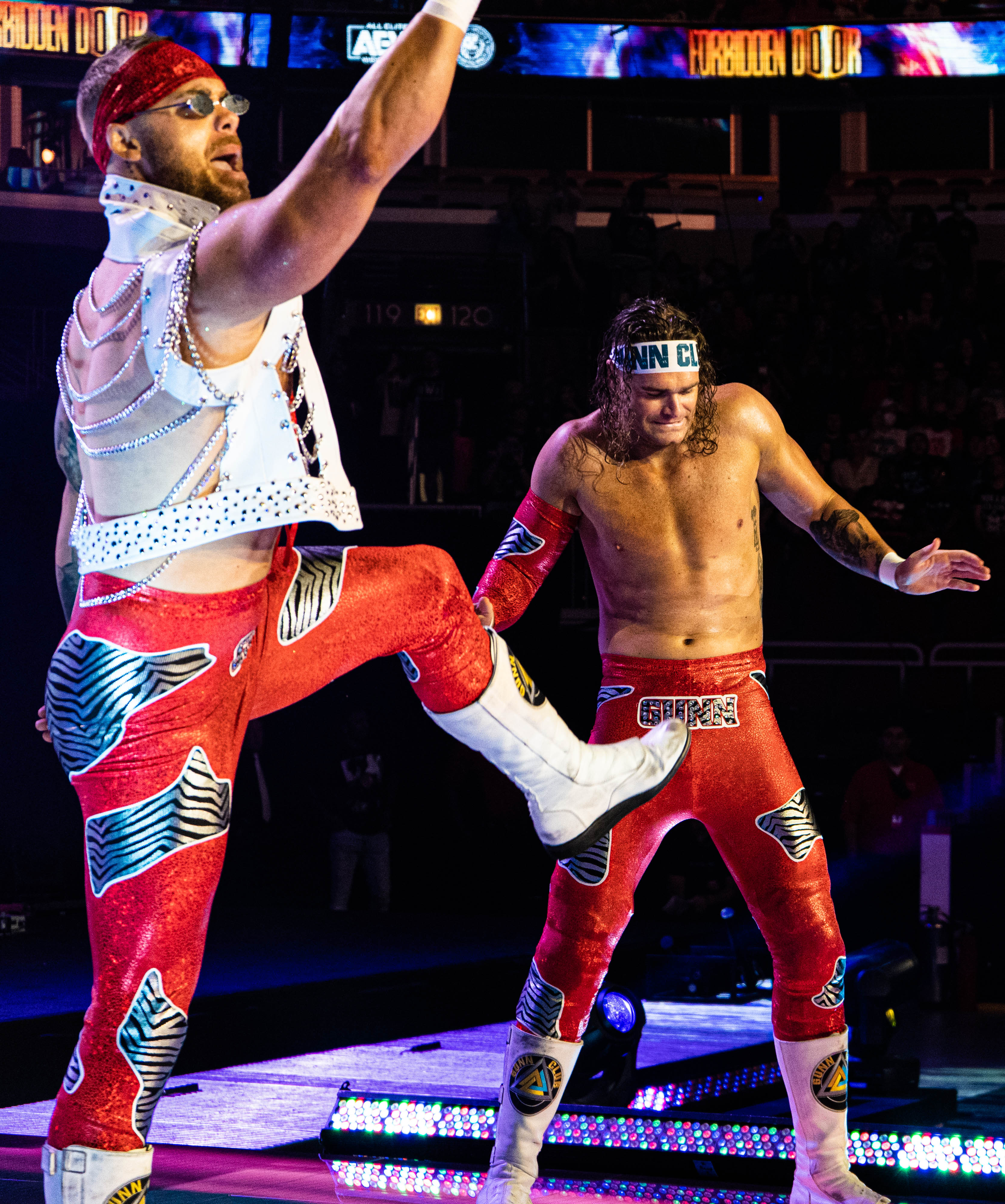
- Colten (right) and Austin (left) Gunn at AEW x NJPW: Forbidden Door in June 2022

Tag team
- Name(s): The Gunn Club; The Gunns
- Members: Austin Gunn; Colten Gunn
- Former members: Billy Gunn
- Debut: January 1, 2020
- Years active: 2020–present

The Gunns are a professional wrestling tag team consisting of real-life brothers Austin and Colten Gunn, who are the sons of professional wrestler Billy Gunn. They are signed to All Elite Wrestling (AEW) and Ring of Honor (ROH), where they are a sub-group of The Cut stable.

Austin and Billy first began teaming on the independent circuit in 2017, before Austin debuted for AEW as his father's tag team partner in 2020. The two began teaming as The Gunn Club. They became a trio later that year when Colten debuted in AEW and joined the group; they teamed for the next two years, until Austin and Colten turned on Billy in favor of siding with Stokely Hathaway in 2022. They soon ceased using the Gunn Club name and began referring themselves as simply "The Gunns". They achieved major success in 2023, winning the AEW World Tag Team Championship. In April 2024, together with Bullet Club Gold member Jay White, they would win the AEW World Trios Championship. In 2026, The Gunns would become a sub-group of The Cut, a merger between the Bang Bang Gang and The Dogs.

== History ==
=== Independent circuit (2017–present) ===
Austin Gunn made his professional wrestling debut on March 18, 2017, by teaming with his father Billy Gunn at a Sunbelt Wrestling Entertainment event against Adam Rose, Deimos and Justin Oversheet in a handicap match, which Austin and Billy won. The father and son duo teamed with each other on a few more occasions on the independent circuit.

Austin and Colten Gunn would win their first professional wrestling championship at a New South Wrestling event Resurrection on March 11, 2022, where they defeated TME (Duke Davis and Ganon Jones Jr.) to win the New South Tag Team Championship. Two weeks later, at Royal Glory, they lost the titles to The Bad News Boyz (Brandon Tate and Brent Tate) in a three-way match, also involving Facade and James Storm.

=== All Elite Wrestling / Ring of Honor (2020–present) ===
==== Early beginnings; various feuds (2020–2022) ====
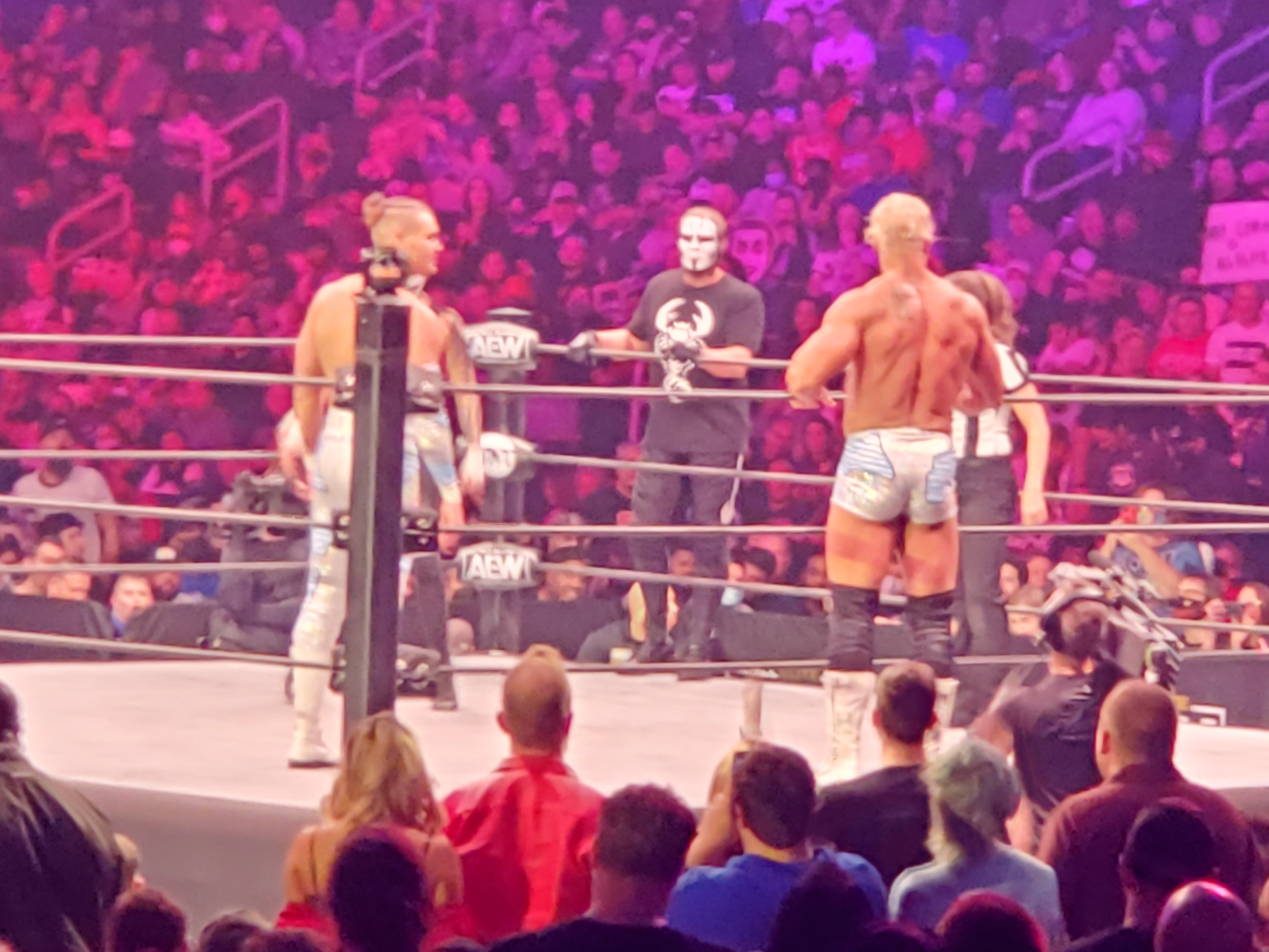
The Gunn Club competing in a tag team match on Dynamite.

Billy Gunn joined the upstart promotion All Elite Wrestling from the very beginning in 2019, as a producer and an occasional on-screen talent. His son Austin debuted for AEW in a non-televised match during a taping of Dark on January 1, 2020, as Austin and Billy defeated Preston Vance and Shawn Spears. Austin's televised debut in AEW occurred on the January 14 episode of Dark, as Austin and Billy, known as "The Gunn Club", defeated Peter Avalon and Shawn Spears. Gunn Club established themselves as fan favorites, winning their earlier matches on Dark throughout the year, until the September 15 episode of Dark, where they teamed with Private Party (Isaiah Kassidy and Marq Quen) against The Dark Order (Alex Reynolds, Evil Uno, John Silver and Stu Grayson) in an eight-man tag team match, which Dark Order won. Gunn Club's first match as a team on Dynamite occurred on November 4, where they teamed with Cody Rhodes to defeat Dark Order members Colt Cabana, John Silver and Ten in a six-man tag team match.

On the November 17 episode of Dark, Gunn Club expanded to a trio as Billy's elder son Colten made his professional wrestling debut by teaming with Billy and Austin to defeat Bshp King, Joey O'Riley and Sean Maluta. Austin and Colten made their pay-per-view debut at Revolution on March 7, 2021, by participating in a Casino Tag Team Royale as the #5 and #6 entrants, for a future AEW World Tag Team Championship opportunity. They were both eliminated by Q. T. Marshall. On the Thanksgiving Eve episode of Dynamite on November 24, The Gunns defeated Bear Country. Gunn Club enjoyed a successful run on Dark throughout 2021, winning all of their tag team and six-man tag team matches. Their success continued in 2022, resulting in Austin and Colten topping AEW's tag team rankings on February 9, with a tag team record of 3–0 in 2022. As a result, Austin and Colten earned a World Tag Team Championship opportunity against Jurassic Express (Jungle Boy and Luchasaurus) on the February 11 episode of Rampage, which they failed to win. Austin and Colten would fail in subsequent #1 contender's matches on the February 23 and March 2 episodes of Dynamite to earn another opportunity at the titles.

During this time, Gunn Club transitioned into villains by forming an alliance with The Acclaimed (Anthony Bowens and Max Caster). Caster began teaming with Gunn Club more frequently after Bowens suffered a knee injury in May. They began appearing more on Dynamite and Rampage, beginning with the June 1 episode of Dynamite, where they lost to CM Punk and FTR (Cash Wheeler and Dax Harwood). On the Road Rager episode of Rampage, Caster and Gunn Club defeated Ruffin It (Bear Boulder, Bear Bronson and Leon Ruffin). At AEW x NJPW: Forbidden Door, the entire Gunn Club trio teamed with Caster to defeat Alex Coughlin, Kevin Knight, The DKC and Yuya Uemura.

On the 2022 Blood and Guts episode of Dynamite, Caster and the Gunn Club lost to Danhausen and FTR after Bowens accidentally hit Austin with his crutch. Austin and Colten confronted Acclaimed after the match and left the ring, while Billy stayed with the Acclaimed. The following week, on Dynamite, the Acclaimed and Gunn Club defeated Fuego Del Sol and Ruffin It in an eight-man tag team match. However, Billy attacked the Acclaimed after the match due to dissension between both teams. This would result in the Gunn Club facing the Acclaimed in a dumpster match on the August 3 episode of Dynamite, which Gunn Club lost. Billy tried to reconcile with Austin and Colten on the August 17 episode of Dynamite but Stokely Hathaway appeared on the stage and Austin and Colten turned on Billy by attacking him and siding with Hathaway, which resulted in Acclaimed making the save and forming an alliance with Billy. This marked Billy's removal from the Gunn Club.

Austin and Colten resumed their alliance with Stokely Hathaway, as they joined his group of wrestlers The Firm and changed their name to The Gunns. Gunns began mocking FTR by impersonating them during their matches, also including attacking them post-match at Final Battle. This led to a match between both teams at the Holiday Bash episode of Dynamite, which the Gunns won.

==== Bullet Club Gold / Bang Bang Gang (2023–2026) ====
On the February 8 episode of Dynamite, Gunns defeated The Acclaimed to win the AEW World Tag Team Championships. After successfully defending the titles twice, The Gunns name-dropped FTR among the teams they had beaten during a post-match interview, which led to FTR returning to AEW and attacking the Gunns. The Gunns subsequently lost against FTR in a title vs career match on the April 5 edition of Dynamite. This would effectively disband The Firm, with the Gunns allying with Jay White and Juice Robinson of Bullet Club Gold.

On January 17, 2024, The Gunns and White defeated Mogul Embassy (Brian Cage, Kaun and Toa Liona) for the ROH World Six-Man Tag Team Championship. On the January 20 episode of Collision, The Gunns, White, The Acclaimed, and Billy Gunn joined forces to form a stable known as the Bang Bang Scissor Gang, reuniting Austin and Colten with their father Billy. On March 13 at Big Business, Bullet Club Gold turned on The Acclaimed and Billy Gunn, disbanding the Bang Bang Scissor Gang. On April 5 at Supercard of Honor, The Gunns made their debut for Ring of Honor (ROH), teaming with White to retain their ROH World Six-Man Tag Team Championships against Monstersauce (Lance Archer and Alex Zayne) and Minoru Suzuki. At Dynasty Zero Hour, Bullet Club Gold defeated The Acclaimed in a winner takes all championship unification match to unify the ROH World Six-Man Tag Team Championship with the AEW World Trios Championship as the Unified World Trios Championship. During this time, Bullet Club Gold silently renamed to the Bang Bang Gang. On the June 5 Rampage tapings, a returning Robinson wrestled his first match since his return, teaming with The Gunns to win a trios match. After the match, White announced that he was giving Robinson a share of the Unified Trios Championship held by White and the Gunns, thus invoking the Freebird Rule. However, on the July 13 episode of Collision, interim AEW Executive Vice President Christopher Daniels overruled Bang Bang Gang's attempt to invoke the Freebird Rule and stripped them of the Unified World Trios Championship. On the following week, The Gunns and Robinson failed to win the vacant AEW World Trios Championship, which was won by The Patriarchy (Christian Cage, Killswitch and Nick Wayne) after interference from Mother Wayne. On August 25 at All In, The Gunns and Robinson participated in a four-way ladder match for the trios titles, which was won by Pac and Blackpool Combat Club (Claudio Castagnoli and Wheeler Yuta).

On the February 5, 2025 episode of Dynamite, The Gunns returned after a brief hiatus and challenged The Hurt Syndicate (Bobby Lashley and Shelton Benjamin) to a match for the AEW World Tag Championships the following week, where they were defeated. In July 2025, Colten would suffer a legitimate knee injury during a match, leaving him out of action indefinitely and putting the team on hiatus.

Colten returned with his brother on the May 2, 2026 episode of Collision, assisting their stablemates Juice Robinson and Ace Austin against the Death Riders.

==== The Cut (2026–present) ====
On the October 21 episode of Dynamite, the Bang Bang Gang turned heel after aligning with The Dogs to attack the Death Riders and the Conglomeration. After initially naming the alliance The Last Outfit on the October 24 episode of Collision, Jay White announced that the group would instead be known as The Cut. At Full Gear on November 14, The Gunns and their stablemates defeated the Death Riders and the Conglomeration in Anarchy in the Arena.

== Championships and accomplishments ==
- All Elite Wrestling
  - AEW World Tag Team Championship (1 time)
  - AEW World Trios Championship (1 time) – with Jay White
- New South Wrestling
  - New South Tag Team Championship (1 time)
- Ring of Honor
  - ROH World Six-Man Tag Team Championship (1 time) – with Jay White
