= The Dogs (professional wrestling) =

Professional wrestling stable

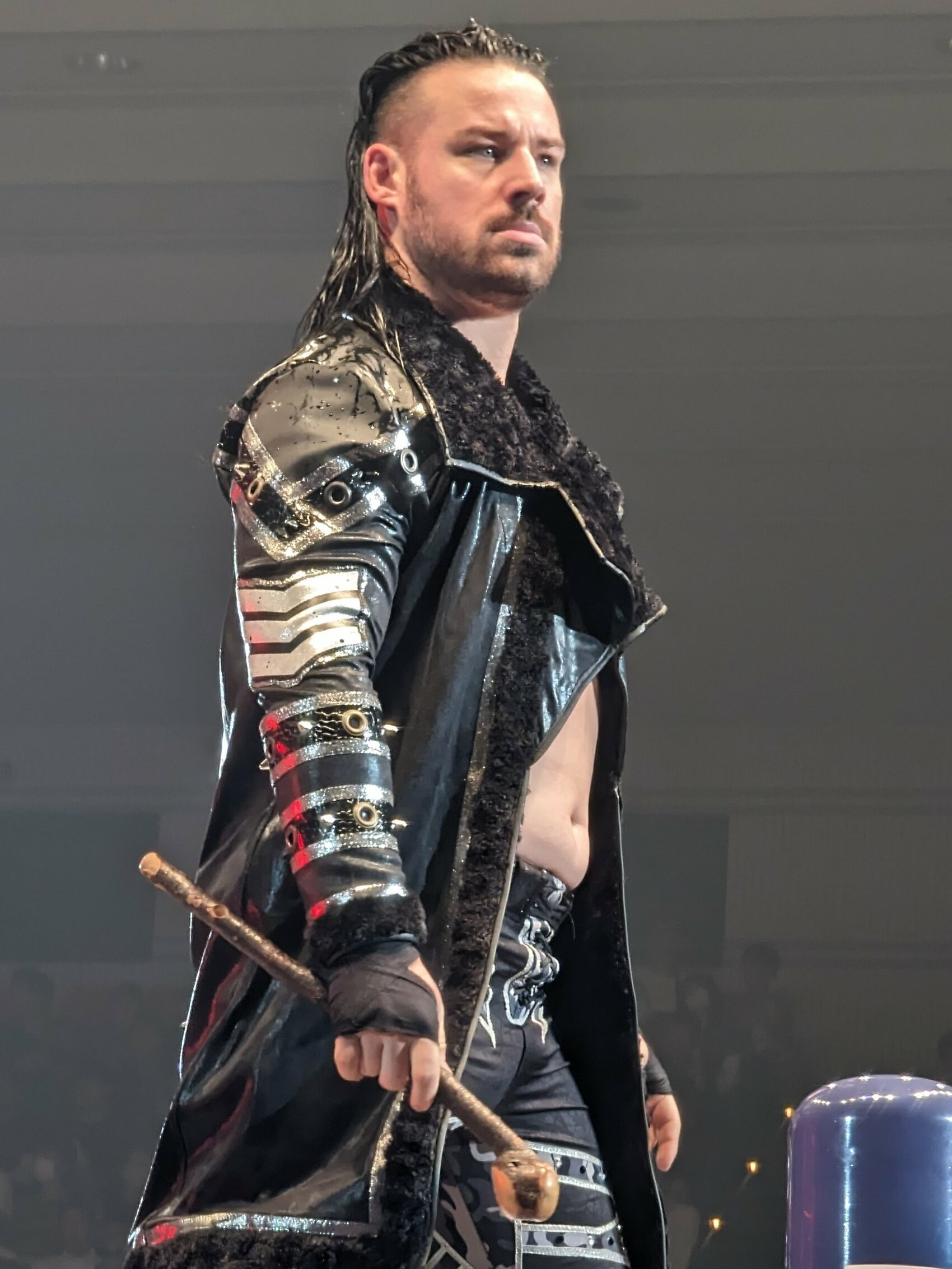
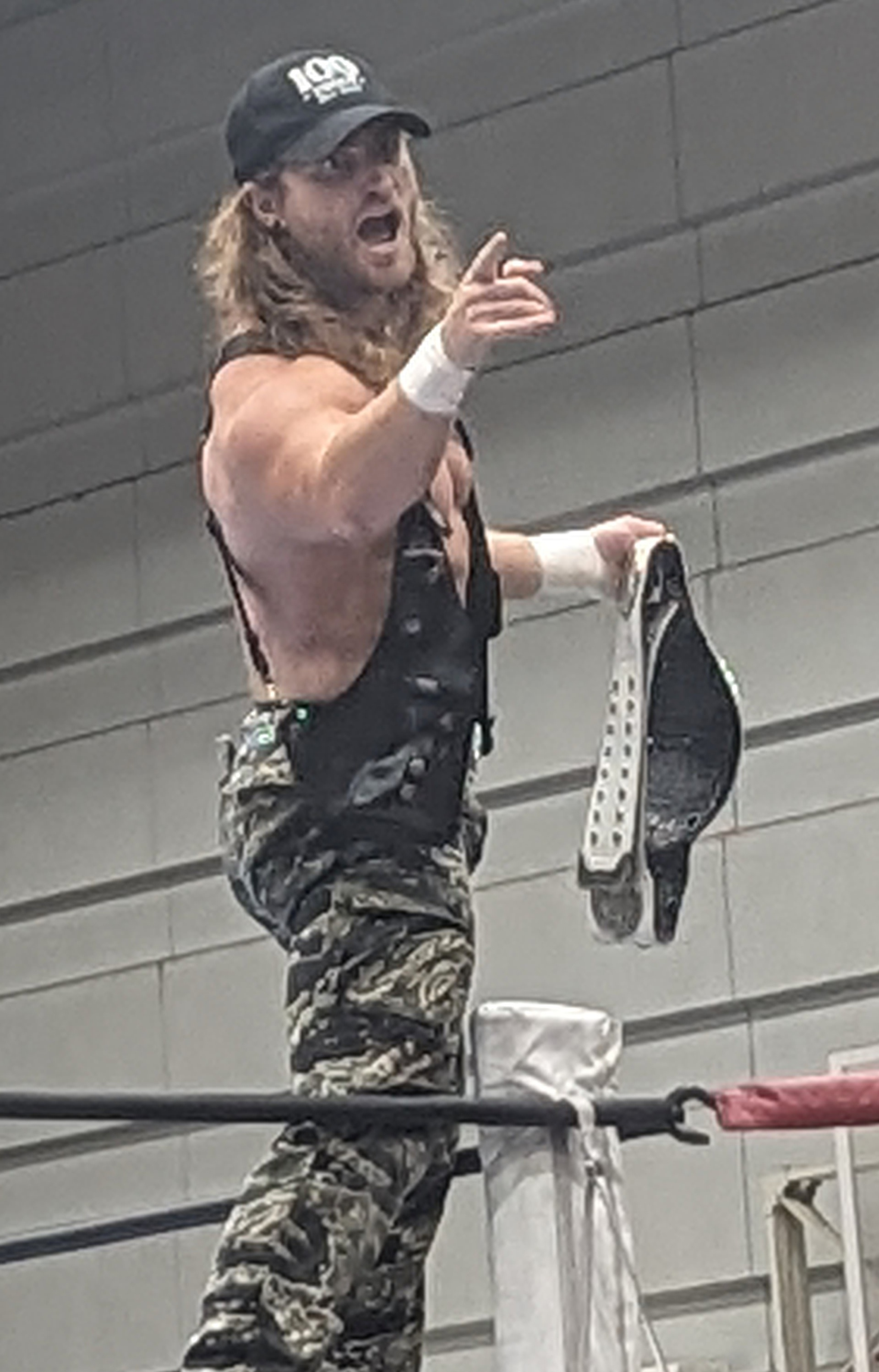
- Finlay (left) and Connors (right) in 2023

Tag team
- Members: David Finlay; Clark Connors
- Name: The Dogs
- Former members: Gabe Kidd
- Debut: January 31, 2026
- Years active: 2026–present

The Dogs are a villainous professional wrestling tag team, consisting of David Finlay and Clark Connors. They are signed to All Elite Wrestling (AEW), where they are a sub-group of The Cut stable.

== Background ==
David Finlay, Clark Connors, and Gabe Kidd first teamed up in 2023 as members of Bullet Club in New Japan Pro-Wrestling (NJPW), which they joined in the first half of the year. With in Bullet Club via the War Dogs sub-group, Kidd and Alex Coughlin won the Strong Openweight Tag Team Championship, while Connors and Drilla Moloney won the IWGP Junior Heavyweight Tag Team Championship. As the fifth and final leader of Bullet Club, Finlay won the NEVER Openweight Championship once and the IWGP Global Heavyweight Championship twice. At New Year Dash!! on January 5, 2026, Finlay and Yota Tsuji announced the merger of Bullet Club and the Unaffiliated stable, into the Unbound Co. stable. However, Finlay, Connors and Kidd left NJPW and the stable in February and March.

== History ==
=== Formation; World Trios Champions (2026) ===
In January 2026, Clark Connors and Gabe Kidd began feuding with Darby Allin. The duo of Connors and Kidd would be known as "The Dogs" (a reference to their former NJPW stable, Bullet Club War Dogs). On the March 4 episode of Dynamite, Connors and Kidd were joined by their former Bullet Club leader David Finlay in The Dogs. It was later announced that all three were now signed to AEW. At Revolution on March 15, The Dogs were defeated by Allin, Orange Cassidy, and Roderick Strong in a tornado trios match. On the April 8 tapings of Collision, The Dogs defeated Místico and JetSpeed (Kevin Knight and "Speedball" Mike Bailey) to win the AEW World Trios Championship, marking their first championship in AEW. AEW officially began recognizing this reign when the episode aired on tape delay on April 11. They then lost the Trios Title to The Conglomeration (Orange Cassidy, Roderick Strong, and Kyle O'Reilly) at Dynasty on April 12, ending their reign at 4 days, although AEW officially recognizes that their reign only lasted one day. During the match, Kidd suffered a legitimate shoulder injury and was later rendered out indefinitely by AEW president Tony Khan in the post-show media scrum.

On June 14 at Dominion 6.14 in Osaka-jo Hall, Kidd announced himself as the newest member of the Death Riders following an attack on Shota Umino, while also keeping his status in The Dogs and formed an alliance between the two stables. At Forbidden Door on June 28, Connors and Finlay failed to capture the AEW World Tag Team Championship from Cage and Cope (Christian Cage and Adam Copeland) after Finlay was attacked during the match by his former NJPW rival, a returning Jay White. During the Road to G1 Climax tour on July 6, Kidd defeated Shota Umino to win the IWGP Global Heavyweight Championship. On July 26 at Redemption, Connors and Finlay defeated Jay White and his Bang Bang Gang stablemate Juice Robinson in a Double Chain match due to interference from members of the Death Riders. Kidd returned to AEW television on the August 19 episode of Dynamite. On August 30 at All In, The Dogs failed to regain the AEW World Trios Championship in a Trios Roulette Royale. On September 26 at the Saturday Tailgate Brawl edition of All Out, Finlay and Connors teamed with Daniel Garcia and Wheeler Yuta of the Death Riders, in a losing effort against the Bang Bang Gang (Jay White, Ace Austin, Austin Gunn, and Colten Gunn) in a Tornado Tailgate Brawl, ending their feud.

=== The Cut (2026–present) ===
On the October 21 episode of Dynamite, Finlay and Connors kicked Kidd out the group, and aligned with the Bang Bang Gang after attacking the Death Riders and the Conglomeration. On the October 24 episode of Collision, group leader Jay White announced that his alliance of the Bang Bang Gang and The Dogs would be known as The Cut.

== Championships and accomplishments ==
- All Elite Wrestling
  - AEW World Trios Championship (1 time) – Connors, Finlay, and Kidd
- New Japan Pro-Wrestling
  - IWGP Global Heavyweight Championship (1 time) – Kidd
