= The Cut (professional wrestling) =

Stable
- Name(s): The Cut; The Last Outfit
- Leader: Jay White
- Members: Ace Austin; Austin Gunn; Clark Connors; Colten Gunn; David Finlay; Juice Robinson
- Debut: October 24, 2026
- Years active: 2026–present

The Cut is a villainous professional wrestling stable in All Elite Wrestling (AEW), consisting of leader Jay White, Ace Austin, Austin Gunn, Clark Connors, Colten Gunn, David Finlay, and Juice Robinson.

The group was formed on the October 21, 2026 episode of Dynamite as a merger between the Bang Bang Gang and The Dogs, as both groups have roots in the Bullet Club stable in New Japan Pro-Wrestling, which existed from 2013 to 2026.

== History ==
On the October 21, 2026 episode of Dynamite, Jay White and the Bang Bang Gang (Ace Austin, Austin Gunn, Colten Gunn and Juice Robinson) turned heel after aligning with The Dogs (Clark Connors and David Finlay) to attack the Death Riders and the Conglomeration. After initially naming the alliance The Last Outfit on the October 24, 2026 episode of Collision, White announced that the group would instead be known as The Cut. At Full Gear on November 14, The Cut (barring Robinson) defeated the Death Riders and the Conglomeration in Anarchy in the Arena.

== Members ==
The Cut
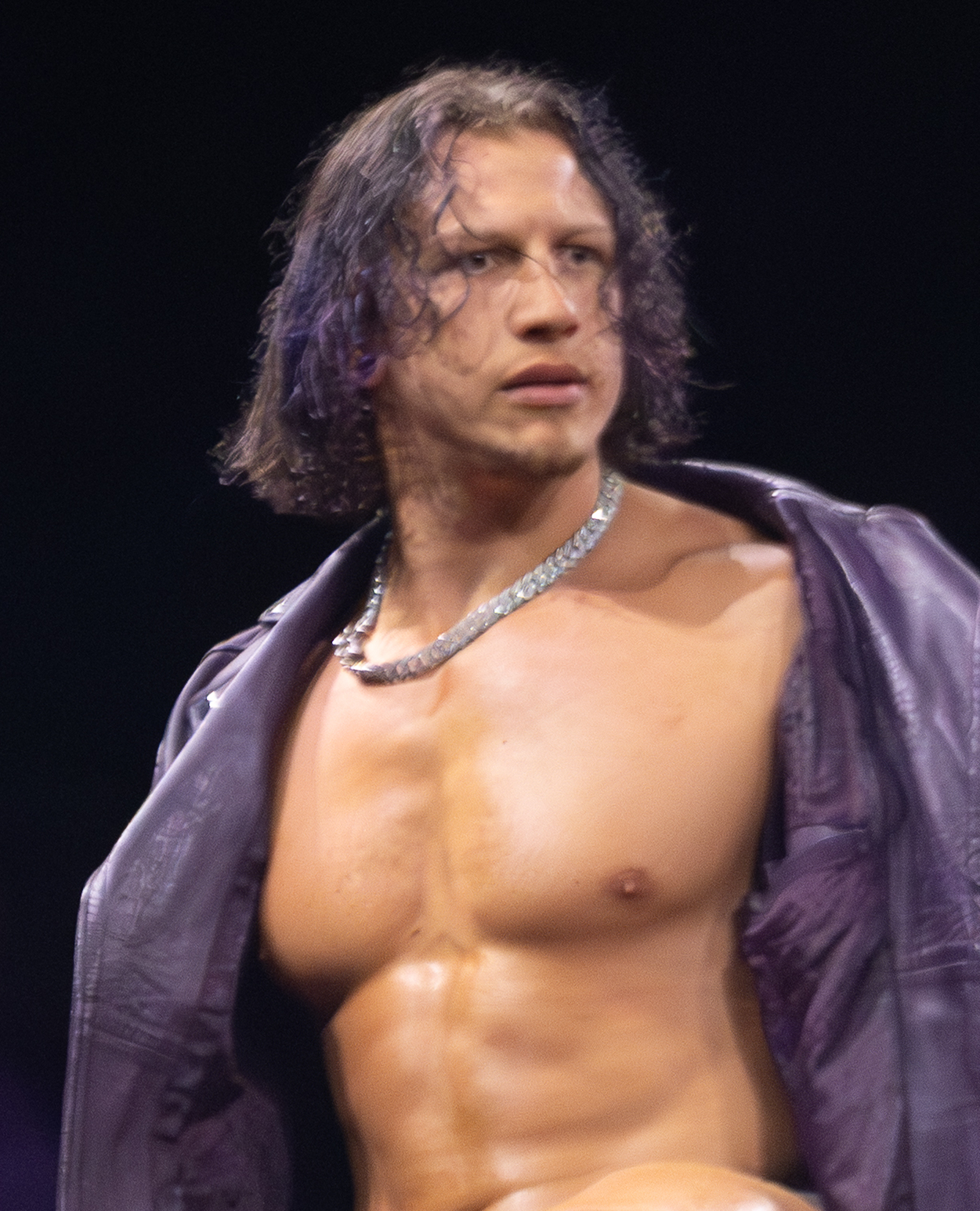
Ace Austin (*)

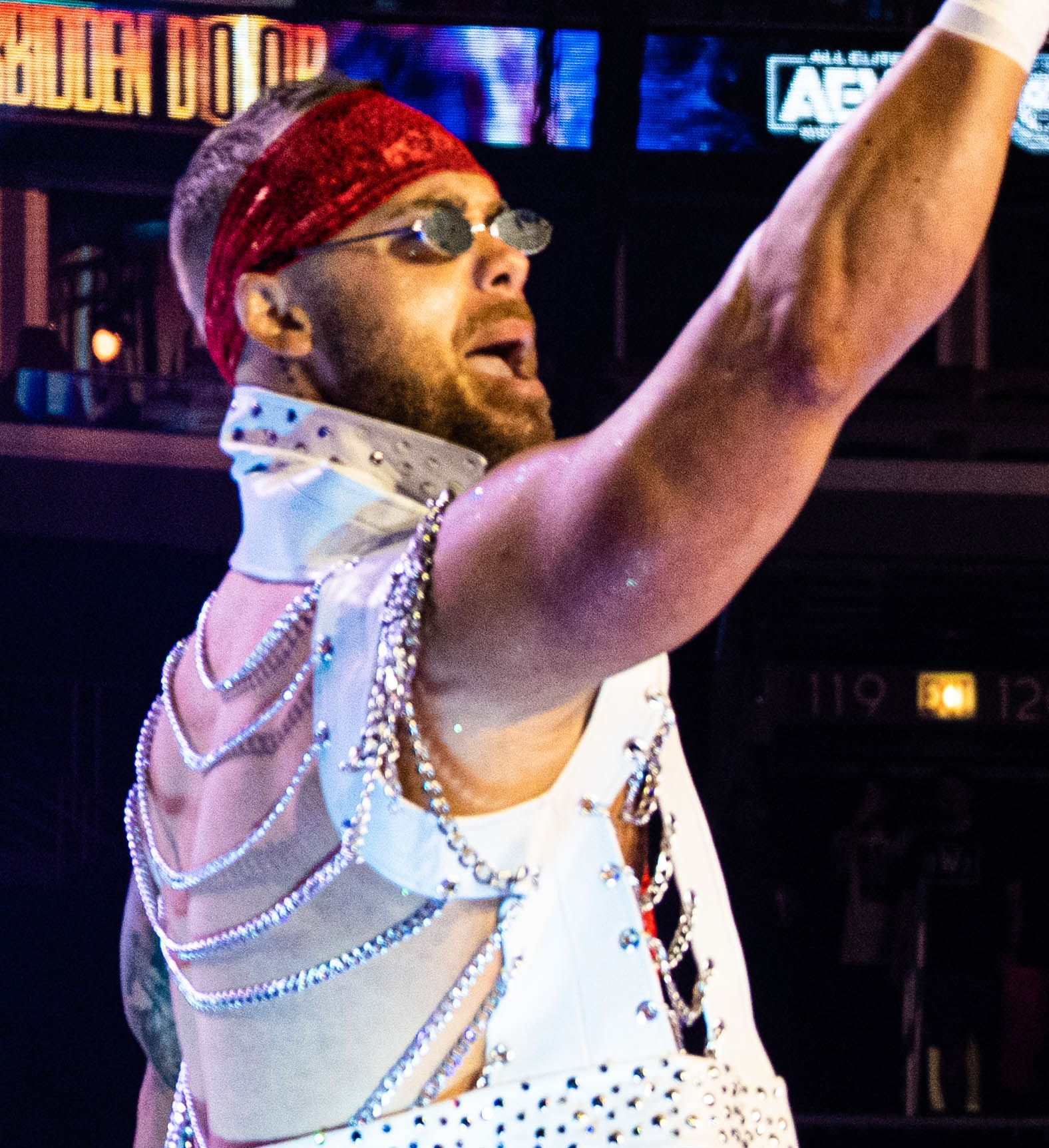
Austin Gunn (*)

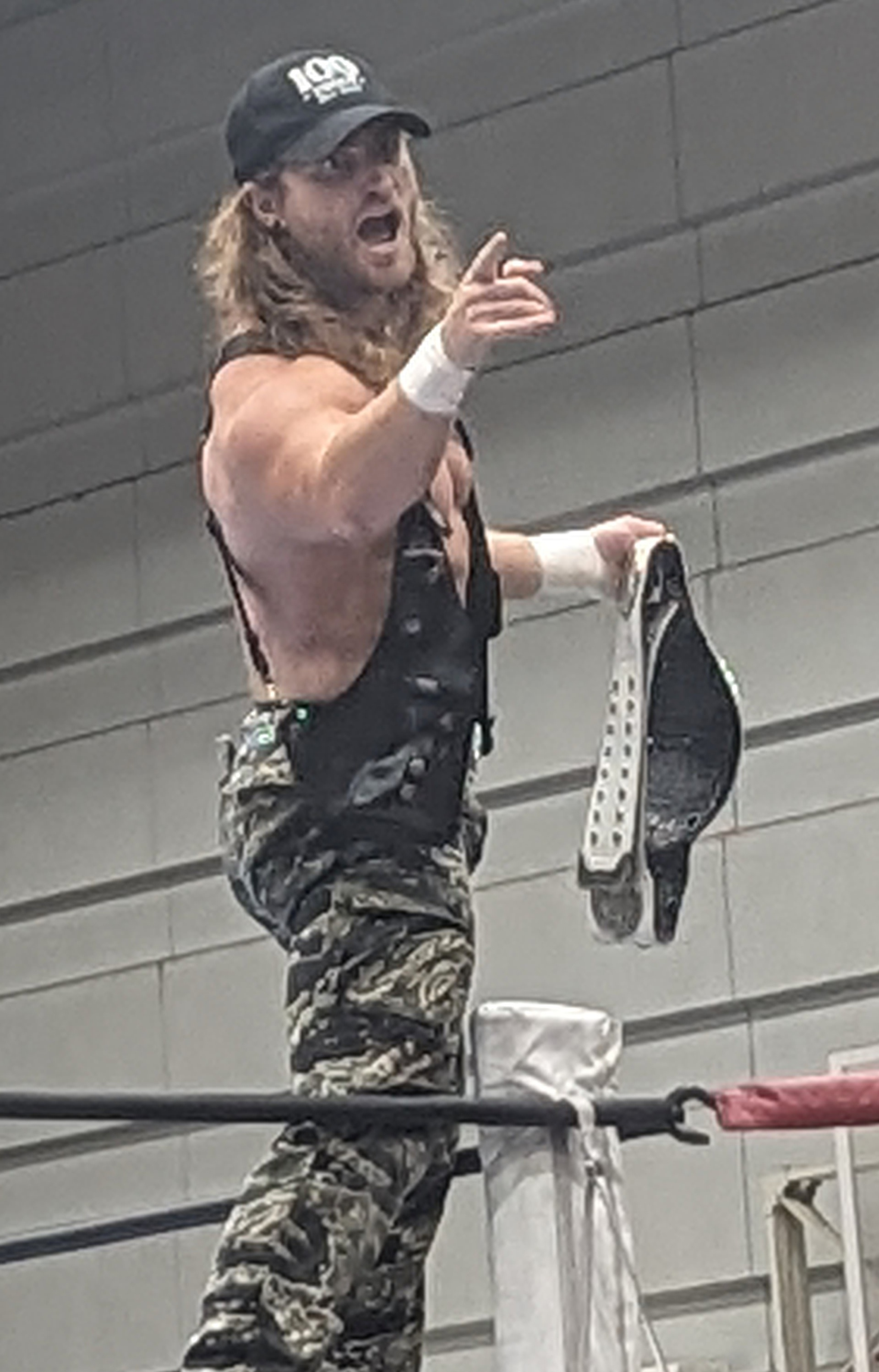
Clark Connors (*)

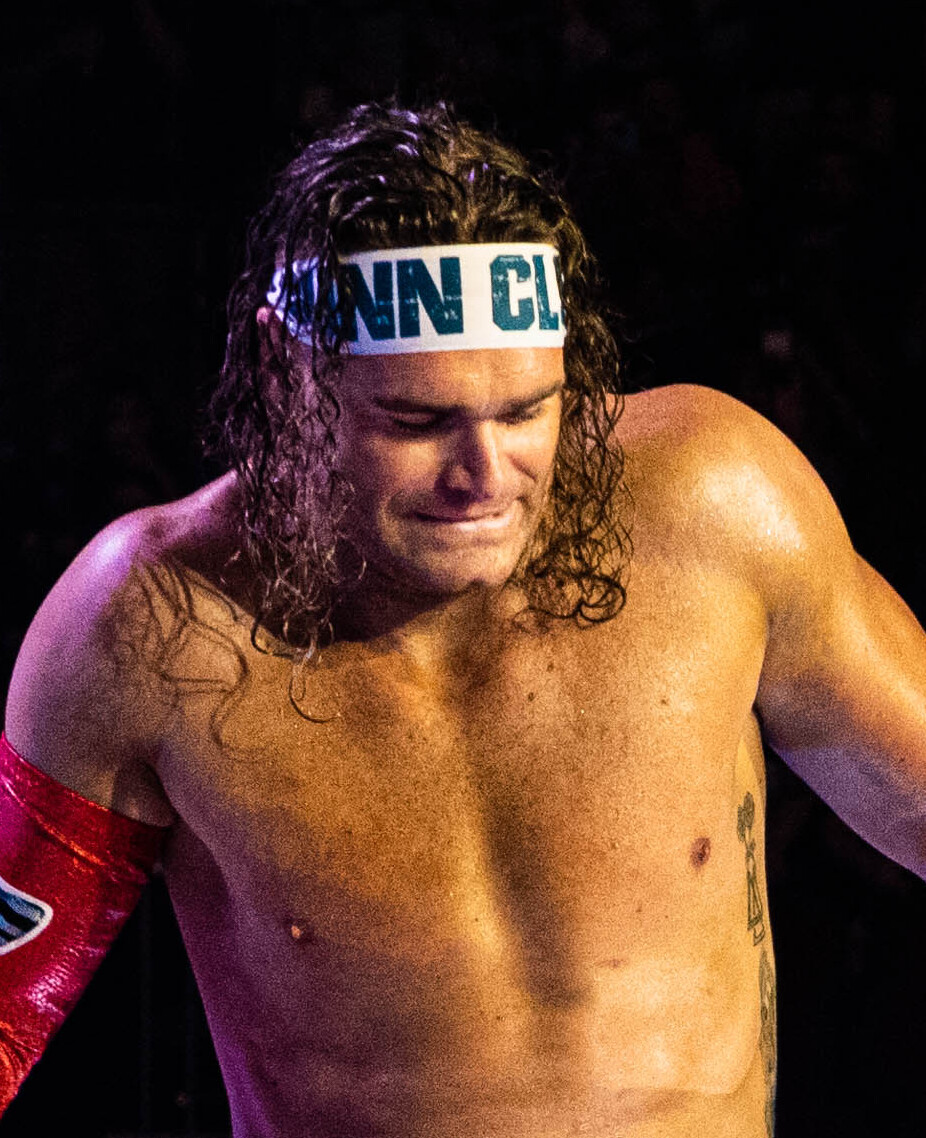
Colten Gunn (*)

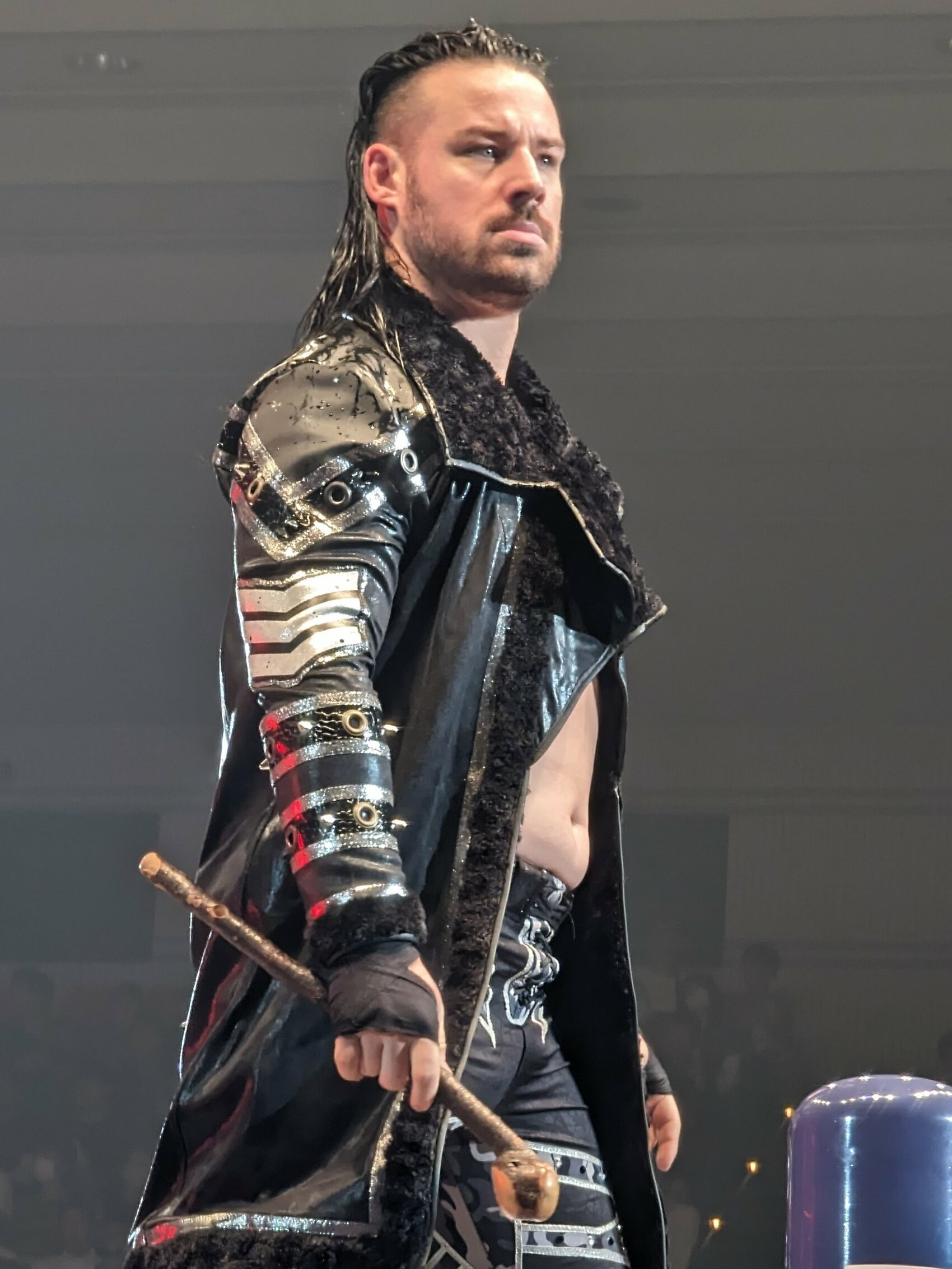
David Finlay (*)

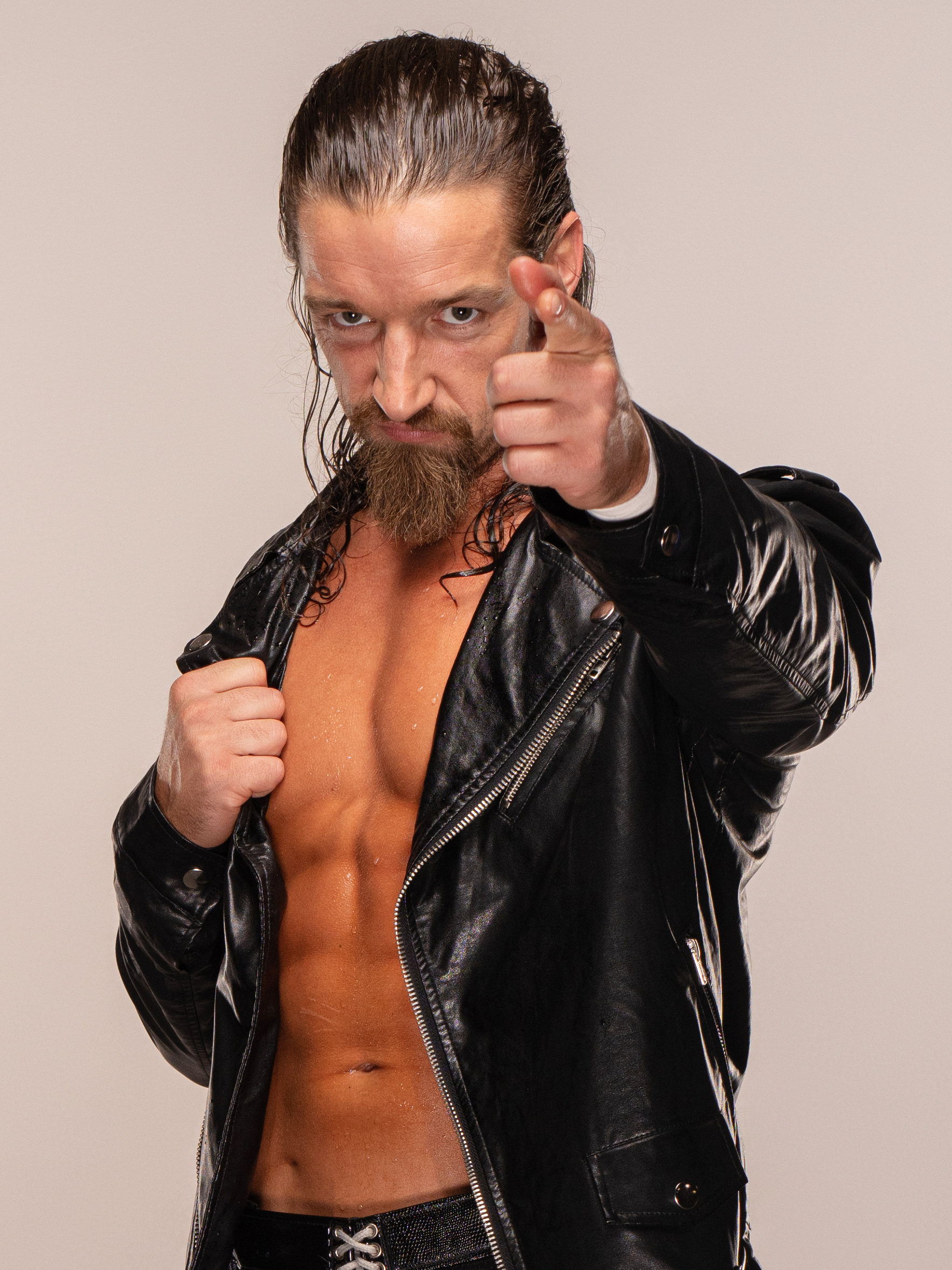
Jay White (*L)

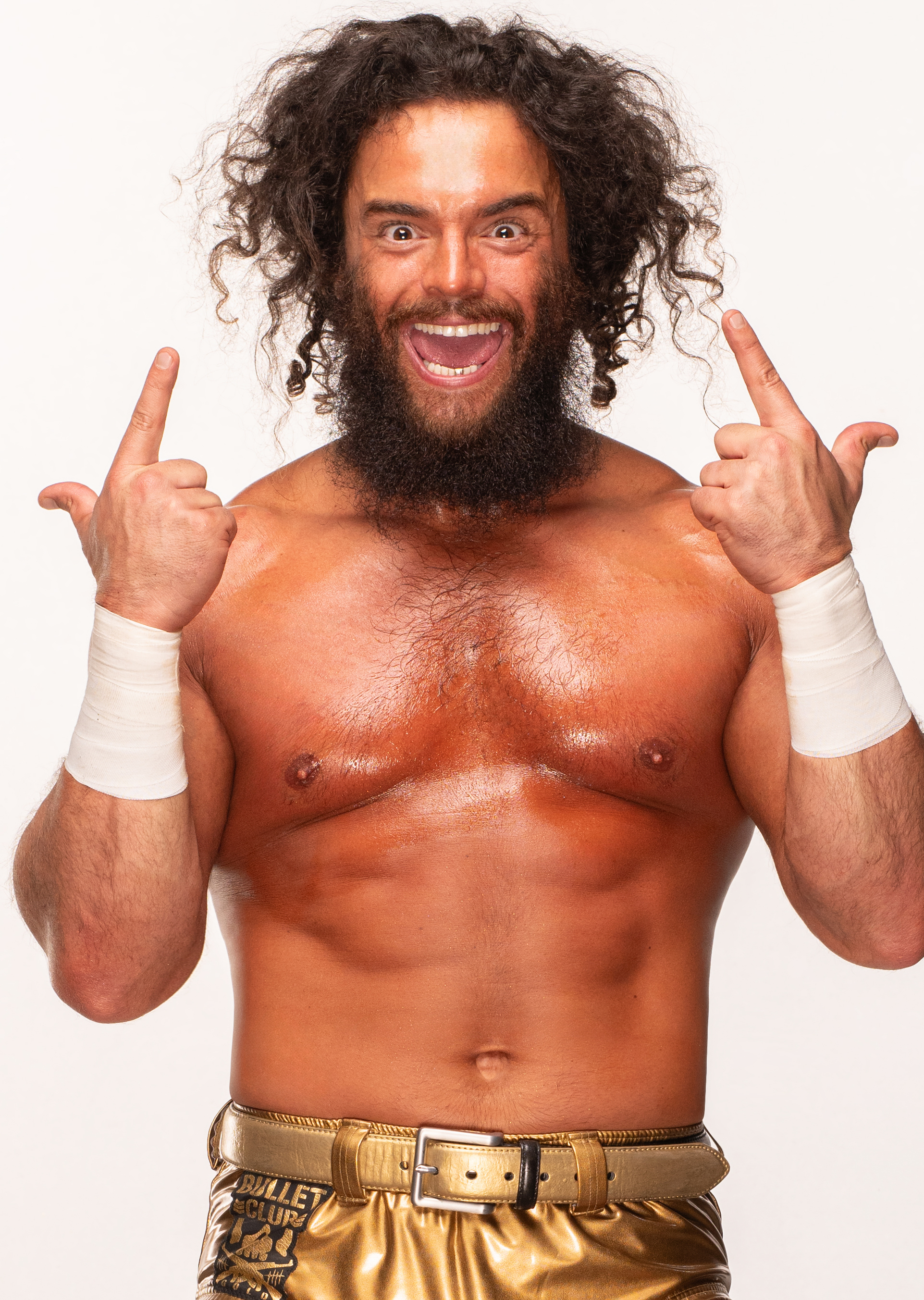
Juice Robinson (*)

*	Founding member
L	Leader

Member		Joined
Ace Austin	*	October 24, 2026
Austin Gunn	*	October 24, 2026
Clark Connors	*	October 24, 2026
Colten Gunn	*	October 24, 2026
David Finlay	*	October 24, 2026
Jay White	*L	October 24, 2026
Juice Robinson	*	October 24, 2026

== Sub-groups ==
Affiliate	Members	Tenure	Type
The Dogs	Clark Connors; David Finlay	2026–present	Tag team
The Gunns	Austin Gunn; Colten Gunn	2026–present	Tag team
