= Bang Bang Gang =

The Bang Bang Gang

Stable
- Name(s): Bang Bang Gang; Bullet Club Gold
- Leader: Jay White
- Members: Juice Robinson; Austin Gunn; Colten Gunn; Ace Austin
- Debut: April 5, 2023
- Disbanded: October 24, 2026
- Years active: 2023–2026

The Bang Bang Gang was a professional wrestling stable that performed in All Elite Wrestling (AEW) and its sister promotion Ring of Honor (ROH). The stable consisted of leader Jay White, Juice Robinson, The Gunns (Austin Gunn and Colten Gunn), and Ace Austin.

The group originally formed as a sub-unit of the Bullet Club in New Japan Pro-Wrestling in 2023 under the name Bullet Club Gold, before adopting the name Bang Bang Gang in 2024. The group became a stand-alone unit in 2026 after the mother stable was merged into Unbound Co. faction. In October, the stable disbanded as a merger between the Bang Bang Gang and The Dogs, the latter consisting of David Finlay and Clark Connors occurred to form The Cut.

== History ==
Jay White made his debut as a member of the All Elite Wrestling (AEW) roster on the April 5, 2023, episode of AEW Dynamite where he came to aid Juice Robinson and attacking Ricky Starks. The team was called Bullet Club Gold, establishing an official branch of the faction in AEW and Austin and Colten Gunn were included in June.

On the January 17, 2024, episode of Dynamite, White and the Gunns defeated Mogul Embassy to become the new ROH World Six-Man Tag Team Champions. They started a program with the AEW World Trios Champions The Acclaimed, defeating them at Dynasty Zero Hour to unify the ROH and AEW championships into the Unified World Trios Championships. During this time, Bullet Club Gold silently switched to the Bang Bang Gang as their primary name. On the July 13, 2024, episode of Collision, after White suffered an injury, both titles were vacated by interim AEW Executive Vice President Christopher Daniels. On the following week, The Gunns and Robinson failed to win the vacant AEW World Trios Championship, which was won by The Patriarchy (Christian Cage, Killswitch and Nick Wayne). On the October 2 episode of Dynamite, White returned from injury and came to the aid of Robinson during an attack by Adam Page, turning the stable into babyfaces. On November 24, Robinson was announced as a participant in the 2024 Continental Classic, but on December 3, Robinson was pulled from the tournament due to injury. In April 2025, White suffered a hand injury and was pulled from television. On July 12, 2025, at All In, Robinson returned from injury as a participant in the men's Casino Gauntlet match, but failed to win. In the same month, Colten would suffer a legitimate knee injury during a match, leaving him out of action indefinitely. Due to Colten's injury, Austin began teaming with Robinson as the duo entered tournaments for an AEW World Tag Team Championship match, but were quickly eliminated. On the September 27, 2025, episode of Collision, Ace Austin joined the Bang Bang Gang.

At New Year Dash!! on January 6, 2026, it was announced that Bullet Club has dissolved and merged into the new Unbound Co. stable, leaving the Bang Bang Gang as a standalone group. Colten returned with his brother on the May 2 episode of Collision, while White returned at Forbidden Door. On July 26 at Redemption, White and Juice Robinson were defeated by The Dogs (David Finlay and Clark Connors) in a Double Chain match due to interference from members of the Death Riders. On September 26 at the Saturday Tailgate Brawl edition of All Out, the Bang Bang Gang defeated Finlay, Connors, the Death Riders' Daniel Garica and Wheeler Yuta in a Tornado Tailgate Brawl. After the match, it was announced that White had suffered another injury was expected to be out of action for up to two months, but returned on October 17 on the Saturday Tailgate Brawl edition of WrestleDream.

On the October 21 episode of Dynamite, the Bang Bang Gang turned heel after aligning with The Dogs to attack the Death Riders and the Conglomeration. On the October 24, 2026 episode of Collision, the Bang Bang Gang merged with The Dogs to form The Cut.

== Members ==
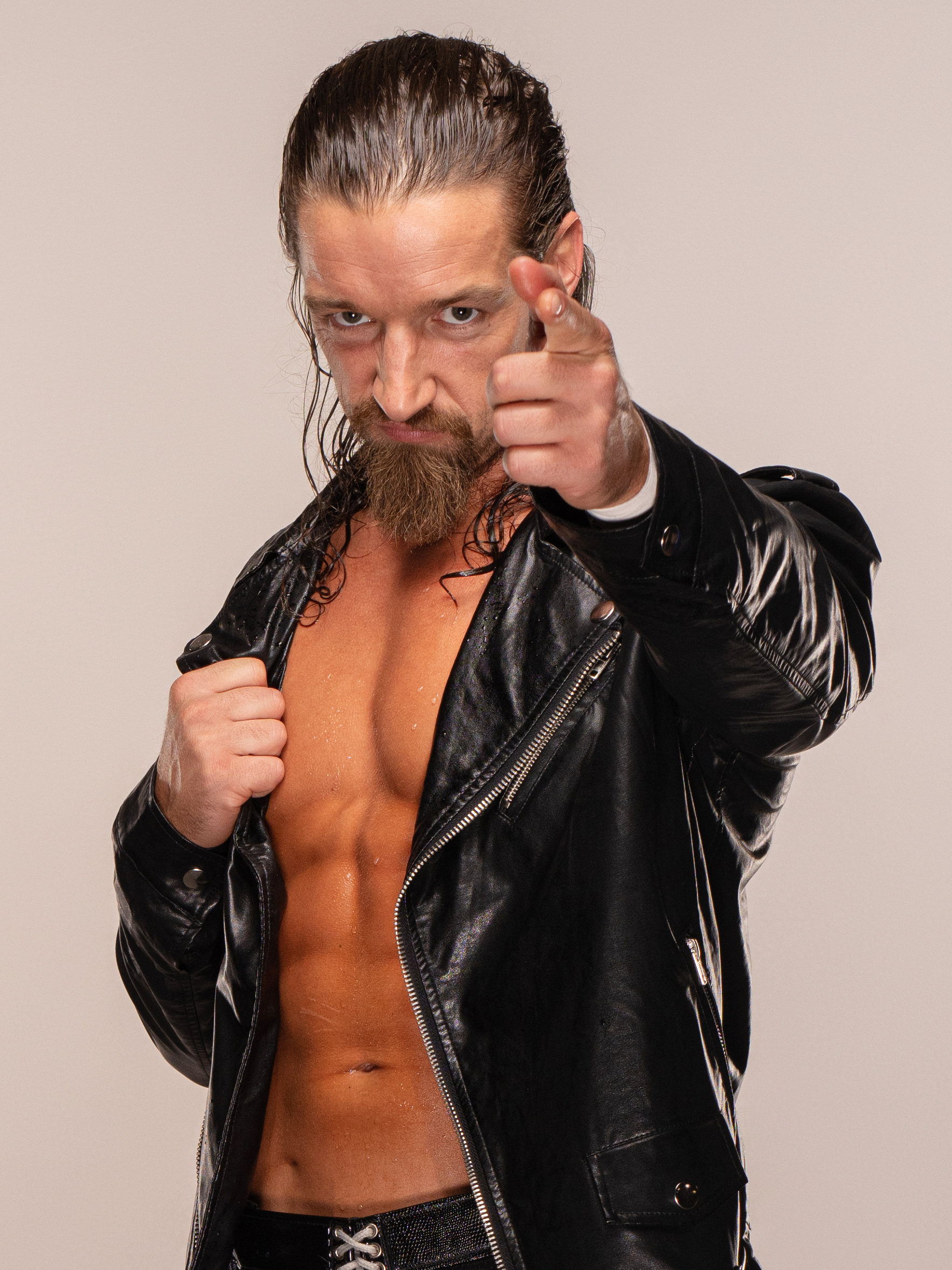
Jay White (*L)

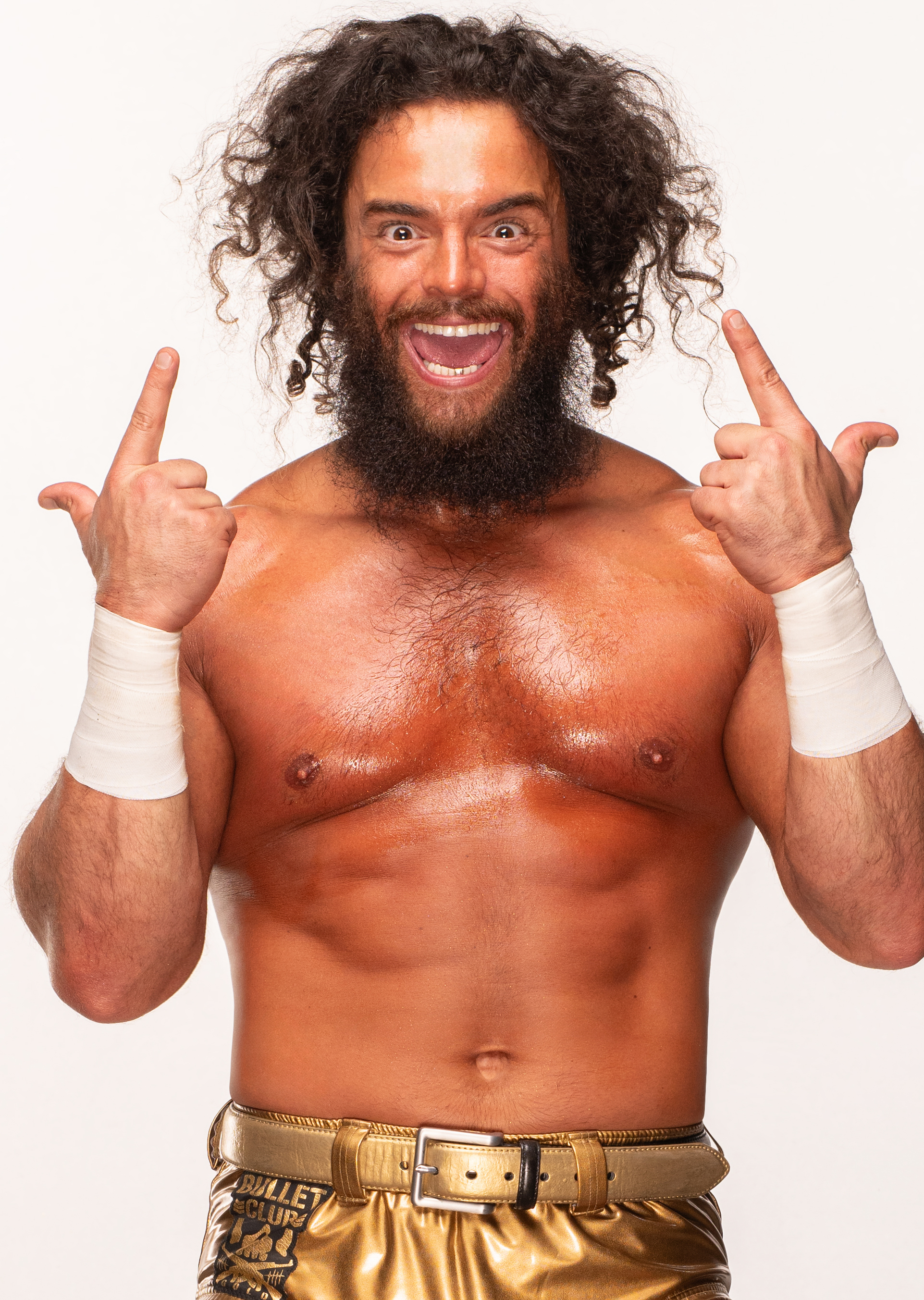
Juice Robinson (*)

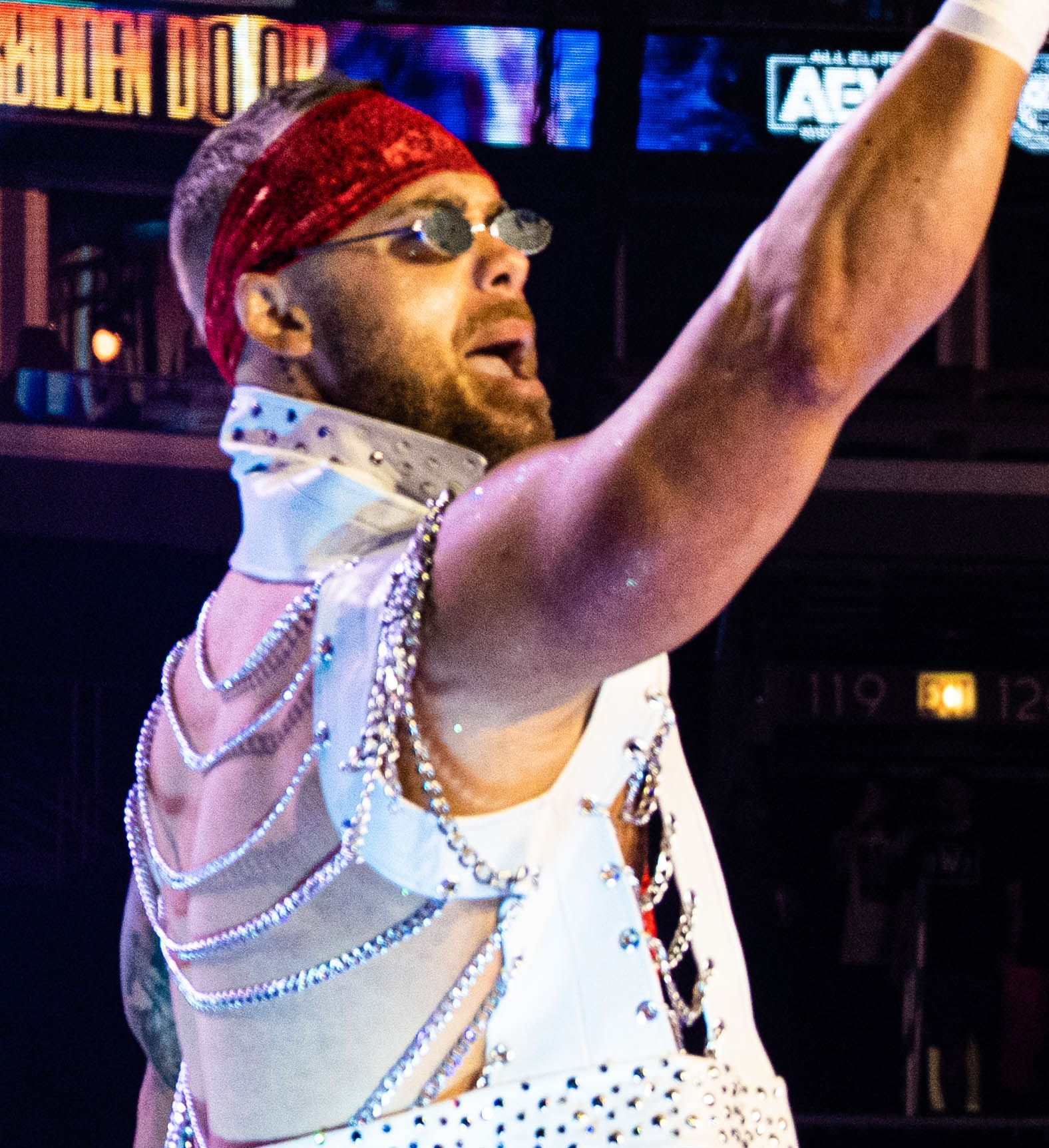
Austin Gunn

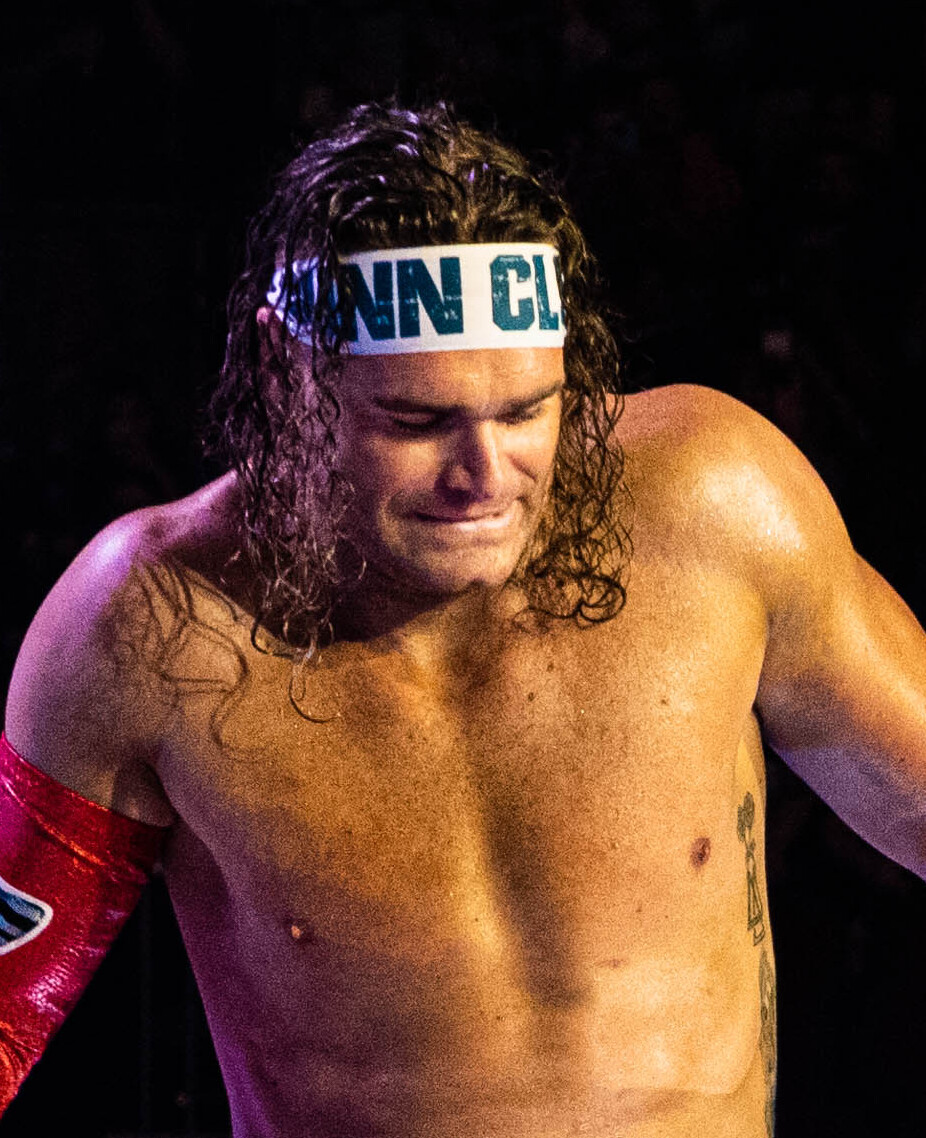
Colten Gunn

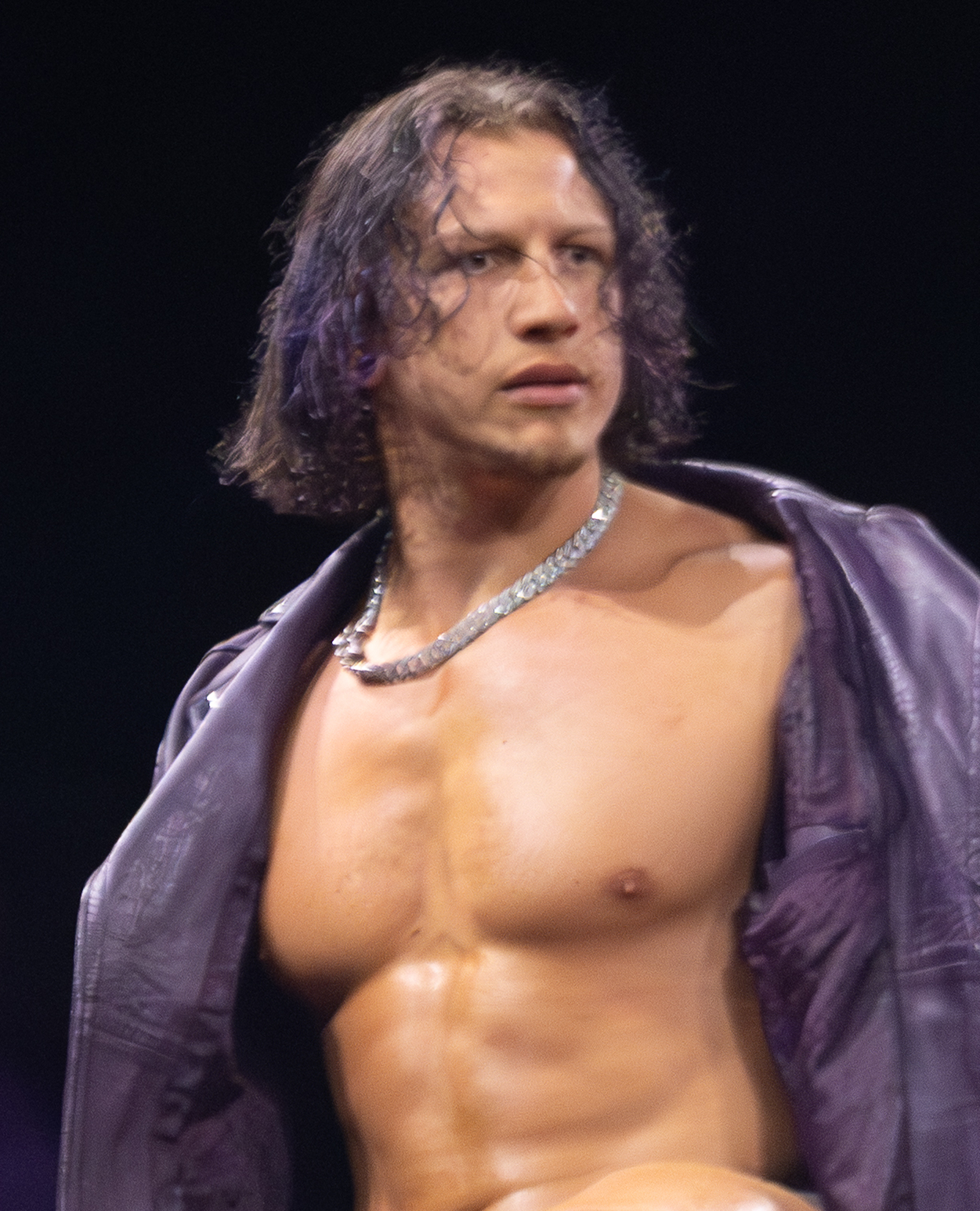
Ace Austin

*	Founding member
L	Leader

Member		Joined	Left
Jay White	*L	April 5, 2023	October 24, 2026
Juice Robinson	*	April 5, 2023	October 24, 2026
Austin Gunn		June 24, 2023	October 24, 2026
Colten Gunn		June 24, 2023	October 24, 2026
Ace Austin		September 27, 2025	October 24, 2026

== Sub-groups ==
Affiliate	Members	Tenure	Type
The Gunns	Austin Gunn; Colten Gunn	2023–2026	Tag team

== Championships and accomplishments ==
- All Elite Wrestling
  - AEW World Trios Championship (1 time) – Jay White and The Gunns
  - Dynamite Dozen Battle Royale (2023) – Juice Robinson
- Ring of Honor
  - ROH World Six-Man Tag Team Championship (1 time) – Jay White and The Gunns
