= The Acclaimed =

Professional wrestling tag team

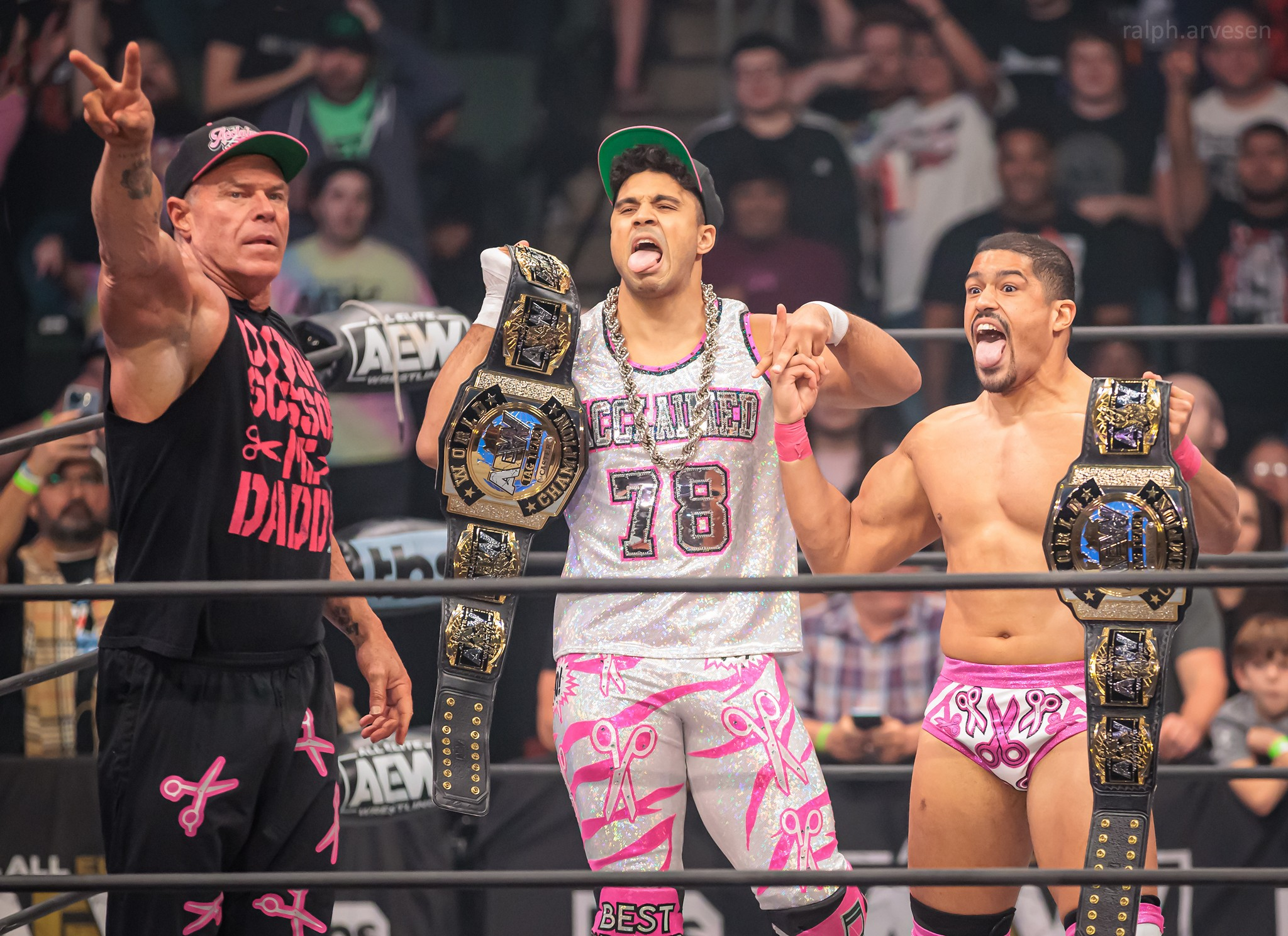
- The Acclaimed in December 2022. From left to right: Billy Gunn, Max Caster and Anthony Bowens

Tag team
- Members: Max Caster; Anthony Bowens; Billy Gunn (manager/trios partner)
- Name(s): Bowens and Caster; The Acclaimed
- Billed heights: Caster 6 ft 1 in (1.85 m); Bowens: 5 ft 10 in (1.78 m); Gunn: 6 ft 4 in (1.93 m)
- Combined billed weight: 695 lb (315 kg)
- Debut: October 27, 2020
- Disbanded: January 18, 2025
- Years active: 2020–2025

The Acclaimed were an American professional wrestling stable in All Elite Wrestling (AEW). The faction consisted of Max Caster and Anthony Bowens – who comprised the main tag team of the group – and Billy Gunn, who served as their manager and wrestled as their partner for six-man tag team matches. Bowens and Caster are former one-time AEW World Tag Team Champions and all three are former one-time AEW World Trios Champions.

== History ==
=== Formation and alliance with The Gunn Club (2020–2022) ===
Caster and Bowens were initially performing individually on AEW programming in 2020. Caster first appeared on AEW Dark as a solo act, with Bowens being brought in a month later. The idea of putting the two together as a tag team was conceived by Tony Khan, who also named them the Acclaimed. Their debut match as a team was against Best Friends, during which they established themselves as heels; according to Bowens, Khan offered them full-time contracts immediately after the match, on a 5-year deal. On the Holiday Bash special, the Acclaimed challenged the Young Bucks for the AEW World Tag Team Championship, but were unsuccessful. Bowens has expressed that initially fan reaction to the team was more negative than expected, which led to him ironically declaring "everyone loves the Acclaimed" in promos.

The Acclaimed competed in a Battle Royal to determine the number 1 contenders for the tag team titles on February 3, 2021, but lost to Chris Jericho and MJF of The Inner Circle. On April 22, 2021 they again competed in a #1 contendership match, this time a four way, where they were defeated by SCU.

On the August 3, 2021 episode of Dark, while making his entrance, Caster rapped about subjects such as Olympic gymnast Simone Biles' mental health issues, the Duke lacrosse case, the validity of PCR COVID-19 testing, and made a sexual joke about Julia Hart. Caster was suspended for two months without pay for the incident, effectively putting the team on hiatus. AEW owner Tony Khan called the rap "terrible", said it should have been edited out of the show and announced that he would personally be taking over the editing of the show going forward. He returned to action at Dark: Elevation on September 1. After Caster returned from suspension, the Acclaimed challenged reigning champions the Lucha Brothers for the tag team titles on the June 10, 2021 episode of Rampage, but were unsuccessful.

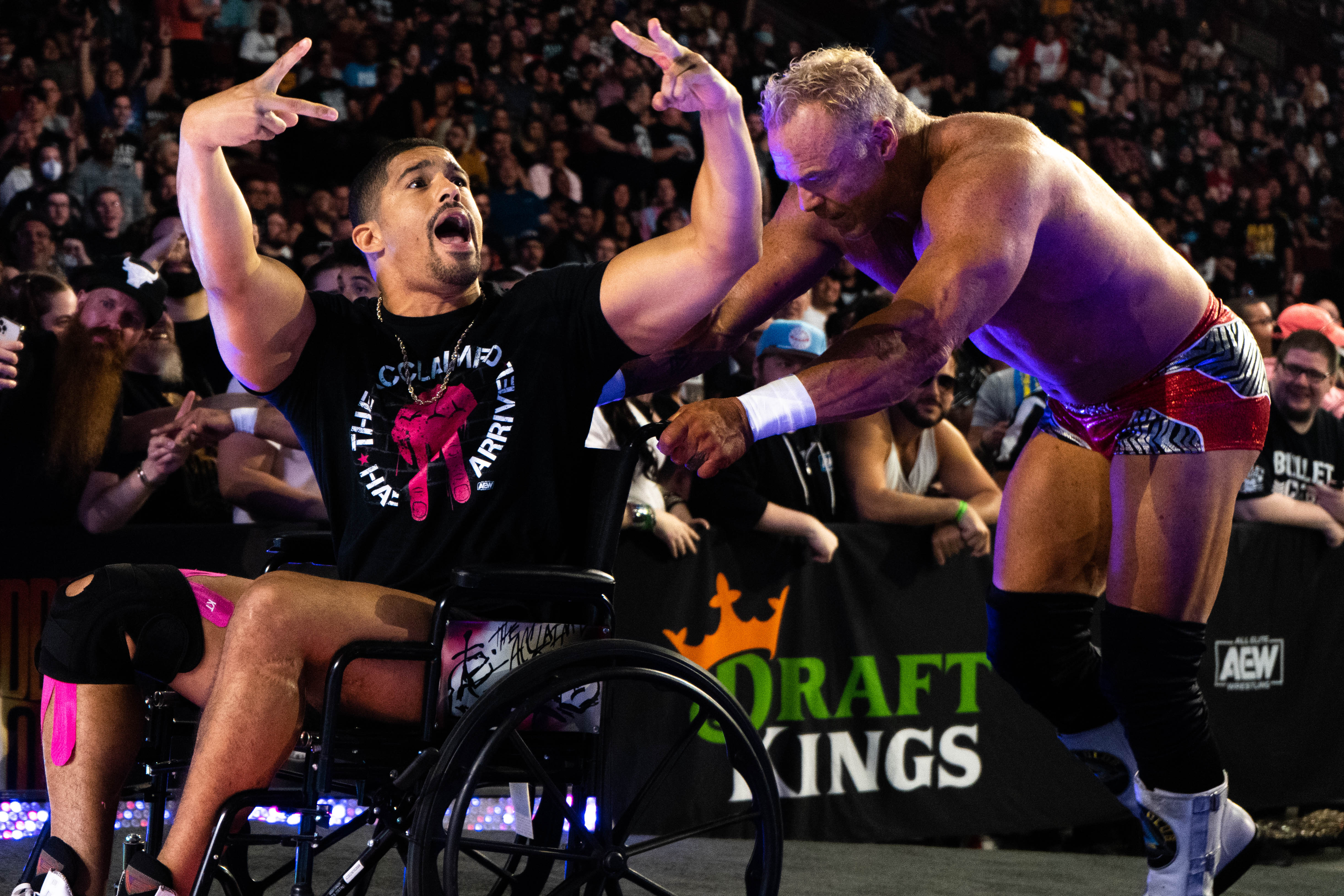
Bowens during his injury with manager Billy Gunn

Beginning in 2022, the Acclaimed allied with the Gunn Club (Billy Gunn & his sons Austin Gunn and Colten Gunn). On Dark and Dark: Elevation, the alliance defeated the Dark Order and later the team of Lee Johnson, Brock Anderson, Lee Moriarty, and Matt Sydal. Although ostentisiably allies, the Acclaimed regularly disparaged Austin and Colton, with Billy Gunn showing unequal favour towards Caster and Bowens. The Acclaimed competed in a #1 contendership tag battle royal on March 3, 2022, although lost to the Young Bucks. They later challenged Jurassic Express for the tag titles, but were unsuccessful. In May 2022, Bowens underwent knee surgery, sidelining him for several months. During this time Bowens still attended AEW shows and performed his regular promos, although did not wrestle and used a wheelchair; Caster subsequently teamed increasingly with the Gunns. Bowens returned from injury at the Blood and Guts edition of Dynamite.

Their alliance with the Gunns broke down and turned into a rivalry in mid-2022, leading to a "Dumpster Match" in August 2022, which the Acclaimed won. While Billy Gunn was initially caught between the two groups, his sons turned on him, having joined the Firm, leading to him becoming the Acclaimed's manager.

=== Championship reigns (2022–2024) ===
In the latter half of 2022, the Acclaimed entered a feud with tag team champions Swerve in our Glory (Swerve Strickland and Keith Lee). At All Out of that year the Acclaimed challenged for tag team championships, although Strickland and Lee retained. After All Out, The Acclaimed turned face due to the favorable crowd reactions they would receive. The Acclaimed again challenged for the titles on the September 21 episode of Dynamite, winning the bout and becoming AEW World Tag Team champions for the first time. Over the following months the team successfully defended the title against Private Party and The Butcher and The Blade in a triple-threat match, the Varsity Athletes (Tony Nese and Josh Woods), and a rematch against Swerve in Our Glory at November's Full Gear.

In early 2023, the Acclaimed resumed their feud with Austin and Colton Gunn. On the February 8, 2023 episode of Dynamite, the Gunns successfully beat the Acclaimed for the tag team championships, ending their reign at 140 days.

As 2023 went along, the three members of the Acclaimed became focused on winning the AEW World Trios Championship. This led to a match on the July 22 episode of AEW Collision, where reigning champions the House of Black (Malakai Black, Brody King and Buddy Matthews) defeated the Acclaimed, leading to Gunn—thinking he was the reason for the loss―taking his boots off and leaving them in the ring, seemingly signifying his retirement (as that is viewed as an established wrestling tradition). In August, the House of Black threw Gunn's boots in a trash compactor, leading to Gunn returning and rejoining Caster and Bowens. On August 27, 2023, at All In, Gunn and The Acclaimed won the AEW World Trios Championship from The House of Black (Malakai Black, Brody King, and Buddy Matthews) in a "House Rules" No Holds Barred six-man tag team match.

On the January 20, 2024 episode of Collision, The Acclaimed joined forces with Bullet Club Gold to form the "Bang Bang Scissor Gang". At Big Business, Bullet Club Gold turned on The Acclaimed, disbanding the "Bang Bang Scissor Gang". At Dynasty: Zero Hour on April 21, 2024, ROH World Six-Man Tag Team Champions Bullet Club Gold defeated Gunn and The Acclaimed for the AEW World Trios Championship in a winner takes all championship unification match to unify the titles as the Unified World Trios Championship, ending their reign at a record 238 days.

=== Various feuds and disbandment (2024–2025) ===
After losing the trios titles, The Acclaimed began a feud with The Young Bucks, defeating them on the June 19 episode of Dynamite, in a eliminator match to earn a future shot at the AEW World Tag Team Championship. The Acclaimed were also a part of Team AEW that defeated The Elite in a Blood and Guts match on July 24 at the namesake event. On the August 14 episode of Dynamite, The Acclaimed's title match against The Young Bucks ended in a disqualification loss due to interference from FTR. On August 25 at All In, The Acclaimed once again failed to win the titles from The Young Bucks in a three-way tag team match, also involving FTR. They then began a feud with MxM Collection (Mansoor and Mason Madden), which led to a match at WrestleDream Zero Hour, where The Acclaimed were victorious. In November 2024, tension between The Acclaimed began to rise as Caster began to refer to himself as the "best wrestler alive", much to the annoyance of Bowens and Gunn. In January 2025 on the Maximum Carnage special episode of Collision, The Acclaimed disbanded after months of dissension.

On the September 27 episode of Collision, Bowens and Caster temporarily reunited to defeat The Swirl (Blake Christian and Lee Johnson). For the rest of the year, Bowens and Caster would begin teasing a potential reunion and teamed up against various opponents. However, the reunion was quietly dropped as Bowens would join The Opps in April 2026 and both Bowens and Caster would leave AEW in October after their contracts expired.

== Championships and accomplishments ==
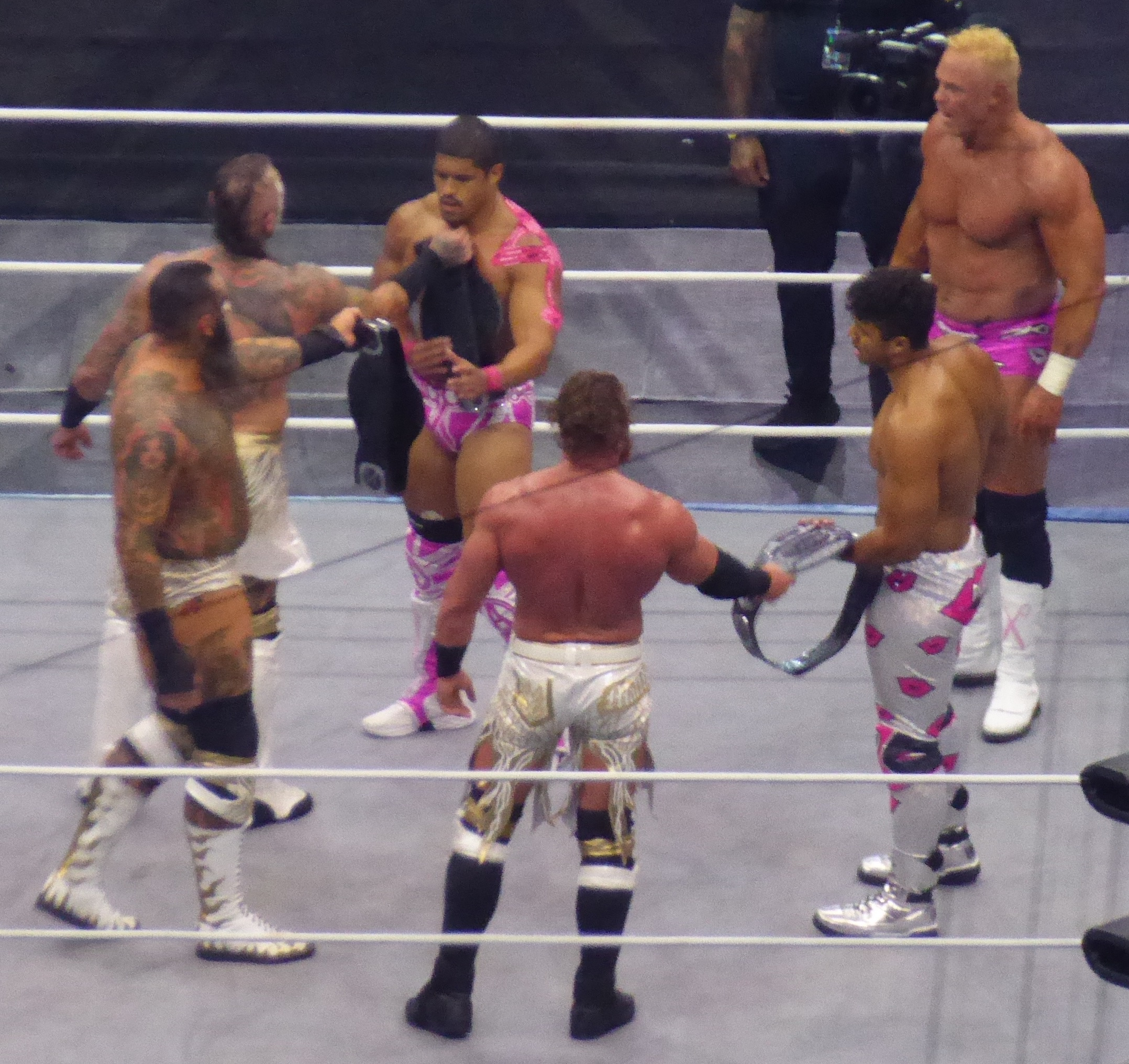
The Acclaimed and Billy Gunn (right) receiving the AEW World Trios Championship from House of Black at All In in August 2023.

- All Elite Wrestling
  - AEW World Tag Team Championship (1 time) – Bowens and Caster
  - AEW World Trios Championship (1 time) – Bowens, Caster and Gunn
- New York Post
  - Male Breakout Wrestler of the Year (2022) – Bowens and Caster
- Wrestling Observer Newsletter
  - Most Improved (2022)
