= Colten Gunn =

American wrestler (born 1991)

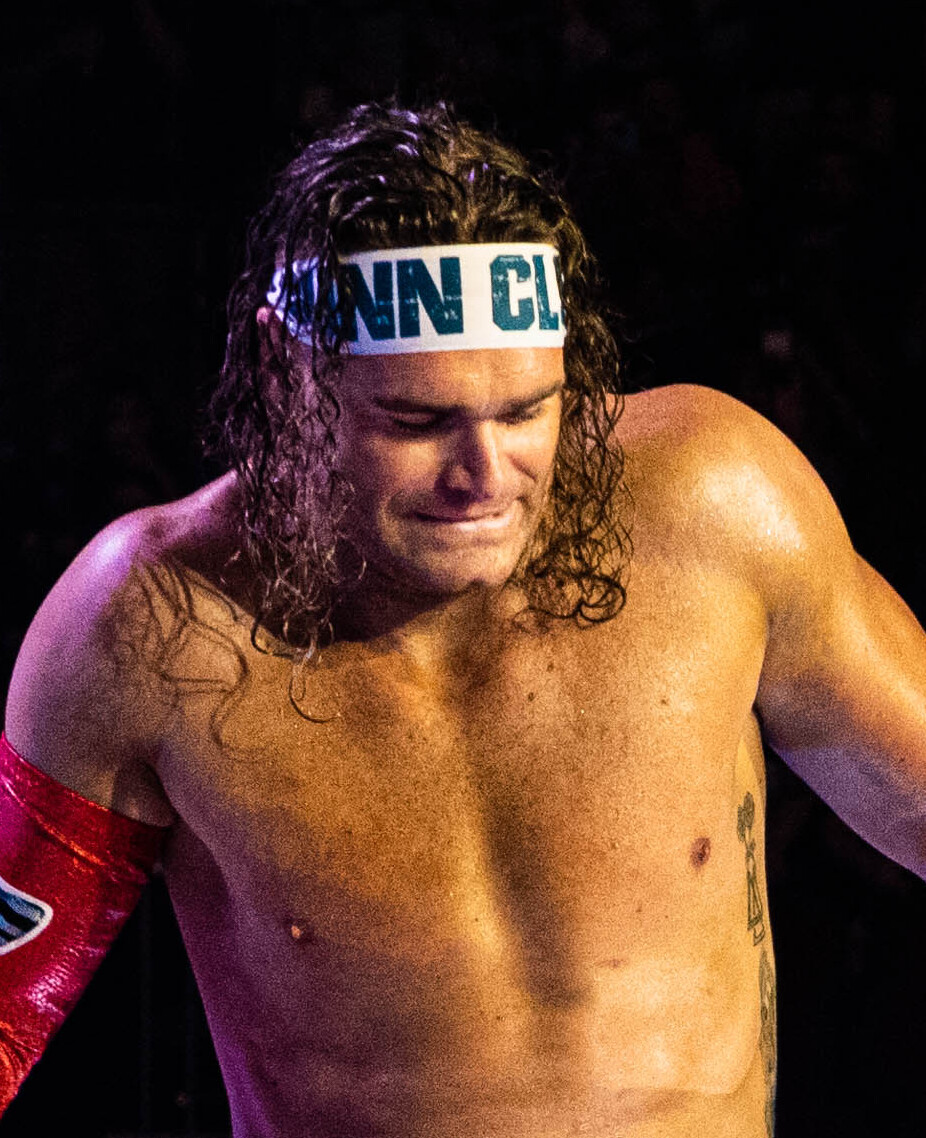
- Gunn in 2022

Personal information
- Born: Colten Sopp; May 18, 1991 (age 35) Orlando, Florida, U.S.
- Education: Florida State University
- Parent: Billy Gunn (father)
- Family: Austin Gunn (brother)

Professional wrestling career
- Ring name: Colten Gunn
- Billed weight: 222 lb (101 kg)
- Billed from: Orlando, Florida
- Trained by: Billy Gunn
- Debut: November 11, 2020; 6 years ago

Colten Sopp (born May 18, 1991), better known by his ring name Colten Gunn, is an American professional wrestler. He is signed to All Elite Wrestling (AEW) and its sister promotion Ring of Honor (ROH), where he is one-half of The Gunns alongside his brother Austin as members of The Cut stable.

A second-generation professional wrestler, Colten is the son of professional wrestler Monty Sopp, better known as Billy Gunn.

== Early life ==
Sopp attended Florida State University, graduating in 2013. Prior to becoming a professional wrestler, he worked in the construction industry in Southern California.

== Professional wrestling career ==
=== All Elite Wrestling/Ring of Honor (2020–present) ===
==== Gunn Club (2020–2022) ====
Sopp was trained to wrestle by his father, Billy Gunn. On June 17, 2020, he appeared with the Jacksonville, Florida-based promotion All Elite Wrestling (AEW), accompanying his father to ringside for his match against MJF on AEW Dynamite and being confronted by Friedman's bodyguard Wardlow. Later that month, Sopp's father filed a trademark for "Colten Gunn". On episode #53 of the web television show AEW Dark, which aired on September 22, Sopp accompanied his father and his brother to ringside for a tag team match.

Sopp made his professional wrestling debut with AEW on November 11, 2020 as "Colten Gunn", teaming with his father and his brother Austin (as "Gunn Club") to defeat BSHP King, Joey O'Riley, and Sean Maluta in a six-man tag team match. The match was broadcast on episode #62 of AEW Dark on November 17, 2020. He returned in the following weeks, teaming with his father and brother in further six-man tag team matches and tag team matches. As part of Gunn Club, Gunn became a member of Cody Rhodes' Nightmare Family stable. On the March 3, 2021 episode of AEW Dynamite, Gunn Club were at ringside for a tag team match pitting Rhodes and Red Velvet against Shaquille O'Neal and Jade Cargill; during the match, Austin Gunn attacked O'Neal at ringside, prompting him to beat down Austin and Colten. Gunn wrestled his first match on pay-per-view at Revolution on March 7, 2021, competing alongside Austin in a "casino" tag team battle royal. Throughout the remainder of 2021, Gunn primarily teamed with his father in tag team bouts on AEW Dark and AEW Dark: Elevation. Gunn wrestled his first match on AEW Dynamite on August 25, 2021, teaming with his father and brother to defeat The Factory in a six-man tag team match.

On the September 1, 2021 episode of AEW Dynamite, the Gunn Club turned heel by attacking Paul Wight. In November 2021, the Gunn Club began a short feud with Darby Allin and Sting that saw Colten sustain his first defeat on the December 1, 2021 episode of Dynamite when he was pinned by Sting; this loss also marked the end of the Gunn Club's undefeated streak in AEW. On February 9, 2022, in a match which would air two days later on AEW Rampage, Colten and Austin Gunn wrestled for the AEW World Tag Team Championship, losing to reigning champions Jurassic Express. In May 2022, the Gunn Club formed an alliance with the Acclaimed which lasted until July 2022 when the Gunn Club turned on the Acclaimed; on the August 3, 2022 episode of Dynamite, the Acclaimed defeated the Gunn Club in a dumpster match.

==== The Gunns (2022–present) ====
On the August 17, 2022 episode of Dynamite, Colten and Austin turned on their father, aligning themselves with Stokely Hathaway; the following week, Colten defeated his father in a singles match following a low blow. In September 2022, the Gunns formed a new stable, "the Firm", with Hathaway, MJF, Ethan Page, Lee Moriarty, and W. Morrissey. The following month, the Firm attacked MJF after he fired Hathaway. On the February 8, 2023 episode of Dynamite, the Gunns defeated the Acclaimed to win their first AEW World Tag Team Championship. At Revolution in March 2023, the Gunns successfully defended their titles in a four way match against the Acclaimed, Danhausen and Orange Cassidy, and Jay Lethal and Jeff Jarrett. On the April 5, 2023 episode of Dynamite, the Gunns lost the AEW World Tag Team Championship to FTR in a title versus career match. The Firm formally disbanded in May 2023 after losing a match dubbed "Firm Deletion".

In June 2023, the Gunns joined Bullet Club Gold alongside Jay White and Juice Robinson. On the January 17, 2024 episode of Dynamite, the Gunns and White defeated Mogul Embassy to win the ROH World Six-Man Tag Team Championship. In the same month, the Gunns and White joined forces with the Acclaimed and Billy Gunn to form a new stable, the "Bang Bang Scissor Gang". At Revolution in March 2024, the Bang Bang Scissor Gang defeated Jay Lethal, Jeff Jarrett, Satnam Singh, Willie Mack, and Private Party in a 12-man tag team match. Later that month, the Bang Bang Scissor Gang disbanded after White and the Gunns attacked the Acclaimed and Billy Gunn. On April 5 at Supercard of Honor, Colten made his Ring of Honor (ROH) debut, teaming with Austin and White to retain the ROH World Six-Man Tag Team Championship against Monstersauce (Lance Archer and Alex Zayne) and Minoru Suzuki. At Dynasty on April 21, 2024, Bullet Club Gold defeated AEW World Trios Champions The Acclaimed in a winner takes all championship unification match to unify the titles as the Unified World Trios Championship. During this time, Bullet Club Gold was renamed the "Bang Bang Gang". On the June 5 Rampage tapings, a returning Robinson wrestled his first match since his return, teaming with the Gunns to win a trios match. After the match, White announced that he was giving Robinson a share of the Unified Trios Championship held by White and the Gunns, thus invoking the Freebird Rule. However, on the July 13 episode of Collision, interim AEW Executive Vice President Christopher Daniels overruled this and stripped the Bang Bang Gang of the Unified World Trios Championship. On the following week, the Gunns and Robinson lost to Christian Cage, Killswitch, and Nick Wayne in a match for the vacant AEW World Trios Championship. On August 25 at All In, The Gunns and Robinson participated in a four-way ladder match for the trios titles, which was won by Pac and Blackpool Combat Club (Claudio Castagnoli and Wheeler Yuta).

On the February 5, 2025 episode of Dynamite, the Gunns returned after a brief hiatus and challenged The Hurt Syndicate (Bobby Lashley and Shelton Benjamin) to a match for the AEW World Tag Championship the following week, where on they were defeated. On the July 19 episode of Collision, Colten would suffer a legitimate knee injury during a match, leaving him out of action indefinitely.

Colten returned with his brother on the May 2, 2026 episode of Collision, assisting their stablemates Juice Robinson and Ace Austin against the Death Riders. On the October 21 episode of Dynamite, the Bang Bang Gang turned heel after aligning with The Dogs to attack the Death Riders and the Conglomeration. After initially naming the alliance The Last Outfit on the October 24 episode of Collision, Jay White announced that the group would instead be known as The Cut. At Full Gear on November 14, The Gunns and their stablemates defeated the Death Riders and the Conglomeration in Anarchy in the Arena.

=== Independent circuit (2021–present) ===
Gunn made his independent circuit debut in September 2021, appearing with Battleground Championship Wrestling in Philadelphia, Pennsylvania. In October 2021, the Gunn Club participated in "Chris Jericho's Rock 'N' Wrestling Rager at Sea Triple Whammy", a professional wrestling event held aboard the Norwegian Jewel. In March 2022 on New South Wrestling's "Resurrection" pay-per-view, Gunn won his first title, teaming with Austin Gunn to defeat TME for the NSW Tag Team Championship. The Gunn Club lost the titles to the Bad News Boyz later that month.

== Professional wrestling style and persona ==
Gunn's finisher is the Colt 45, a butterfly neckbreaker. He previously used a leg drop bulldog, also called the Colt 45; adopted from his father Billy Gunn, who named it the Fame-Ass-Er. Gunn and his brother Austin/his father also use the 3:10 to Yuma as a double-team maneuver: a back body drop by Colten into a neckbreaker by Austin/Billy.

== Personal life ==
Sopp is the son of professional wrestler Monty Sopp, known as Billy Gunn. His brother Austin Sopp is also a professional wrestler.

== Championships and accomplishments ==
- All Elite Wrestling
  - AEW World Tag Team Championship (1 time) – with Austin Gunn
  - AEW World Trios Championship (1 time) – with Austin Gunn and Jay White
- New South Wrestling
  - New South Tag Team Championship (1 time) – with Austin Gunn
- Ring of Honor
  - ROH World Six-Man Tag Team Championship (1 time) – with Austin Gunn and Jay White
