= Austin Gunn =

American professional wrestler

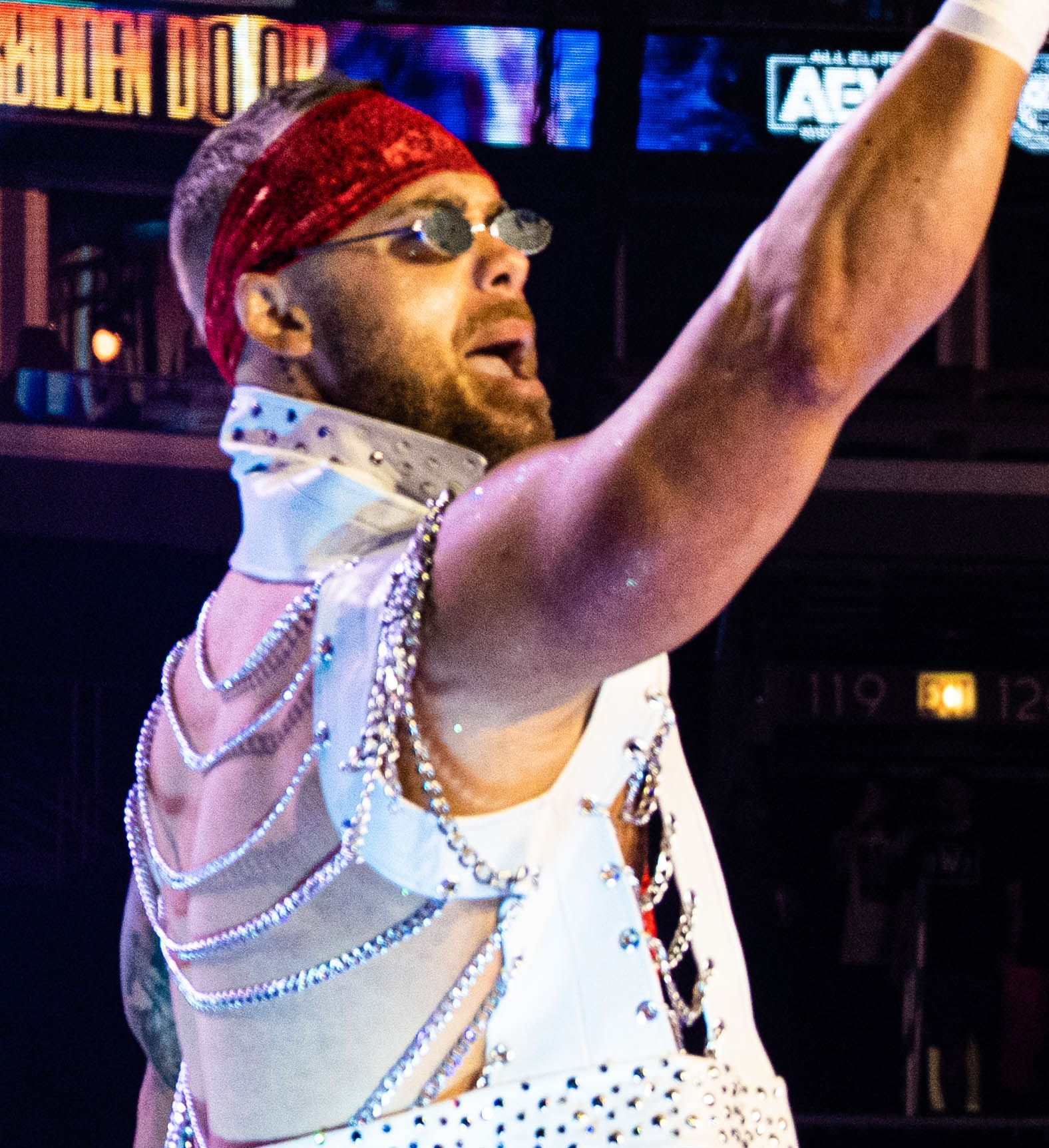
- Gunn in 2022

Personal information
- Born: Austin Sopp; August 26, 1994 (age 32) Orlando, Florida, U.S.
- Education: Rollins College (BA)
- Parent: Billy Gunn (father)
- Family: Colten Gunn (brother)

Professional wrestling career
- Ring name: Austin Gunn
- Billed height: 5 ft 11 in (180 cm)
- Billed weight: 215 lb (98 kg)
- Billed from: Orlando, Florida
- Trained by: Billy Gunn; Bully Ray; D-Von Dudley; Team 3D Academy
- Debut: March 18, 2017

Austin Sopp (born August 26, 1994), better known by the ring name Austin Gunn, is an American professional wrestler and reality television personality. He is signed to All Elite Wrestling (AEW) and Ring of Honor (ROH) where he is one-half of The Gunns alongside his brother Colten as members of The Cut stable. Gunn is a former one-time AEW World Tag Team Champion and a one-time AEW World Trios Champions and ROH World Six-Man Tag Team Champions (collectively held as the Unified World Trios Championship). Sopp is a second-generation professional wrestler, as he is the son of professional wrestler Monty Sopp, better known as Billy Gunn.

== Early life and education ==
Sopp was born on August 26, 1994, in Orlando, Florida. He is a son of professional wrestler Billy Gunn and Tina Tinnell Sopp and the brother of professional wrestler Colten Gunn. Sopp was nominated Computer Science King in 2010 at Lake Brantley High School. Sopp attended Rollins College in Winter Park, Florida, from 2013 to 2017. He was a member of the lacrosse team and graduated with a degree in elementary education.

== Professional wrestling career ==
=== Ring of Honor (2019) ===
In June 2019, Gunn confirmed that he had signed a contract with Ring of Honor (ROH). He made his ROH debut on August 26, 2019, in a dark match as part of the ROH Top Prospect Tournament, defeating Brian Johnson in the quarterfinals and Dante Caballero in the semifinals. On September 28, 2019, Gunn was defeated by Dak Draper in the finals of the Top Prospect Tournament.

=== All Elite Wrestling / Return to ROH (2020–present) ===
==== Gunn Club (2020–2022) ====
On January 9, 2020, it was announced that Gunn had officially signed with All Elite Wrestling. On January 14, Gunn made his AEW debut in a tag team match on AEW Dark teaming with his father Billy Gunn as The Gunn Club defeating the team of Peter Avalon and Shawn Spears. Gunn suffered a torn PCL injury during the match. On November 4, 2020, Gunn (who had previously been involved with his father in tag team matches on Dark) officially made his debut on AEW Dynamite, teaming with his father and Cody Rhodes to defeat Dark Order members 10, John Silver and Colt Cabana. On the November 17, 2020 episode of Dark, Austin's brother Colten, now wrestling as a fellow Gunn Club member, would team with Austin and their father in a match which saw the Gunn Club defeat BSHP King, Joey O’Riley and Sean Maluta by pinfall in a six-man tag team match. The three man Gunn Club would then defeat Cezar Bononi, KTB, and Seth Gargis in another six man tag team match on the November 24, 2020 episode of Dark. On the December 8, 2020 episode of Dark The three man Gunn Club-which entered the ring on a golf cart with the words "Taz Taxi" on the side, defeated Shawn Dean, Sean Maluta & RYZIN. On February 9, 2022 (during a match that aired two days later on AEW Rampage), Austin and Colten Gunn wrestled for the AEW Tag Championship, losing to reigning champions Jurassic Express (Jungle Boy and Luchasaurus). On the April 15, 2022 episode of AEW Rampage, the Gunn Club lost a six-man tag team match to Blackpool Combat Club.

Somewhat outside of AEW, in November 2021 Ring of Honor wrestler Danhausen began a Twitter feud with the Gunn Club, referring to Colten and Austin as "Ass Boys", in reference to Billy Gunn's infamous "Mr. Ass" gimmick in the Attitude Era. While Billy Gunn himself initially had no comment, the rest of Gunn Club despised the nickname after fans began chanting "Ass Boys" during their matches. Billy Gunn finally commented when he surprised his sons by wearing an "Ass Boys" shirt, encouraging them to "embrace the assness" and even started teasing mooning the crowd again.

In May 2022, the Gunn Club formed an alliance with the Acclaimed which lasted until July 2022 when the Gunn Club turned on the Acclaimed; on the August 3, 2022 episode of Dynamite, the Acclaimed defeated the Gunn Club in a dumpster match. On the August 17, 2022 episode of Dynamite, Colten and Austin turned on their father, aligning themselves with Stokely Hathaway.

==== The Gunns (2022–present) ====
In September 2022, the Gunns formed a new stable, "the Firm", with Hathaway, MJF, Ethan Page, Lee Moriarty, and W. Morrissey. The following month, the Firm attacked MJF after he fired Hathaway. On the February 8, 2023 episode of Dynamite, the Gunns defeated the Acclaimed to win their first AEW World Tag Team Championship. At Revolution in March 2023, the Gunns successfully defended their titles in a four-way match against the Acclaimed, Danhausen and Orange Cassidy, and Jay Lethal and Jeff Jarrett.

On the April 5, 2023 episode of Dynamite, the Gunns lost the AEW World Tag Team Championship to FTR in a title versus career match. This would effectively disband The Firm, with the Gunns allying with Jay White and Juice Robinson of Bullet Club Gold.

On January 17, 2024, The Gunns and White defeated Mogul Embassy (Brian Cage, Kaun and Toa Liona) for the ROH World Six-Man Tag Team Championship. On the January 20 episode of Collision, The Gunns, White, The Acclaimed, and Billy Gunn joined forces to form a stable known as the Bang Bang Scissor Gang, reuniting Austin and Colten with their father Billy. On March 13 at Big Business, Bullet Club Gold turned on The Acclaimed and Billy Gunn, disbanding the Bang Bang Scissor Gang. On April 5 at Supercard of Honor, Austin returned to ROH, teaming with Colten and White to retain their ROH World Six-Man Tag Team Championships against Monstersauce (Lance Archer and Alex Zayne) and Minoru Suzuki. At Dynasty: Zero Hour on April 21, 2024, Bullet Club Gold defeated The Acclaimed for the AEW World Trios Championship in a winner takes all championship unification match to unify the titles as the Unified World Trios Championship. During this time, Bullet Club Gold would be renamed to the Bang Bang Gang. On the June 5 Rampage tapings, a returning Robinson wrestled his first match since his return, teaming with The Gunns to win a trios match. After the match, White announced that he was giving Robinson a share of the Unified Trios Championship held by White and the Gunns, thus invoking the Freebird Rule. However, on the July 13 episode of Collision, interim AEW Executive Vice President Christopher Daniels overruled Bang Bang Gang's attempt to invoke the Freebird Rule and stripped them of the Unified World Trios Championship. On the following week, The Gunns and Robinson failed to win the vacant AEW World Trios Championship, which was won by The Patriarchy (Christian Cage, Killswitch and Nick Wayne) after interference from Mother Wayne. On August 25 at All In, The Gunns and Robinson participated in a four-way ladder match for the trios titles, which was won by Pac and Blackpool Combat Club (Claudio Castagnoli and Wheeler Yuta).

On the February 5, 2025 episode of Dynamite, The Gunns returned after a brief hiatus and challenged The Hurt Syndicate (Bobby Lashley and Shelton Benjamin) to a match for the AEW World Tag Championships, which they accepted. On the February 12 episode of Dynamite, The Gunns were defeated by The Hurt Syndicate. Due to an injury to Colten, Gunn began teaming with Juice Robisnon as the duo entered tournaments for an AEW World Tag Team Championship match, but were quickly eliminated. On the September 27 episode of Collision, Gunn and Robinson added Ace Austin to the Bang Bang Gang due to injures to Colten and Jay White. At Worlds End on December 27, Austin and Robinson unsuccessfully challenged FTR for the AEW World Tag Team Championships in a Chicago Street Fight.

On the May 2, 2026 episode of Collision, The Gunns reunited and assisted their stablemates Juice Robinson and Ace Austin against the Death Riders. On the October 21 episode of Dynamite, the Bang Bang Gang turned heel after aligning with The Dogs to attack the Death Riders and the Conglomeration. After initially naming the alliance The Last Outfit on the October 24 episode of Collision, Jay White announced that the group would instead be known as The Cut. At Full Gear on November 14, The Gunns and their stablemates defeated the Death Riders and the Conglomeration in Anarchy in the Arena.

== Other media ==
On December 6, 2021, it was announced that Gunn would appear on the E! reality television series Relatively Famous: Ranch Rules, which aired in early 2022.

== Championships and accomplishments ==
- All Elite Wrestling
  - AEW World Tag Team Championship (1 time) – with Colten Gunn
  - AEW World Trios Championship (1 time) – with Colten Gunn and Jay White
- New South Wrestling
  - New South Tag Team Championship (1 time) – with Colten Gunn
- Ring of Honor
  - ROH World Six-Man Tag Team Championship (1 time) – with Colten Gunn and Jay White
