= All Out (2024) =

All Elite Wrestling pay-per-view event

- Promotional poster featuring various AEW wrestlers
- Promotion: All Elite Wrestling
- Date: September 7, 2024
- City: Hoffman Estates, Illinois
- Venue: Now Arena
- Attendance: 8,660
- Buy rate: 105,000

Pay-per-view chronology
← Previous; All In: London	Next → WrestleDream

All Out chronology
← Previous; 2023	Next → 2025

The 2024 All Out was a professional wrestling pay-per-view (PPV) event produced by All Elite Wrestling (AEW). It was the sixth annual All Out event and took place on September 7, 2024, at the Now Arena in the Chicago suburb of Hoffman Estates, Illinois. This marked the event's fourth edition at the venue, after 2019, 2021, and 2022. It also returned the event to Saturday for the first time since 2020. All Out was previously held during Labor Day weekend, and although the 2024 event had originally been scheduled for the holiday on Sunday, September 1, AEW decided to push the event back by a week due to fan concerns of it taking place only one week after All In, which had occurred the prior year.

Twelve matches were contested at the event, including four on the Zero Hour pre-show. In the main event, "Hangman" Adam Page defeated Swerve Strickland in a Lights Out Steel Cage match. In other prominent matches, Bryan Danielson defeated Jack Perry to retain the AEW World Championship, Will Ospreay defeated Pac to retain the AEW International Championship, and in the opening bout, MJF defeated Daniel Garcia.

The event received generally positive reviews, with the International Championship match and the Lights Out Steel Cage match being singled out for particular praise. However, the latter received some notable criticism from reviewers and industry professionals alike for its perceived overuse of dangerous violence.

== Production ==
=== Background ===
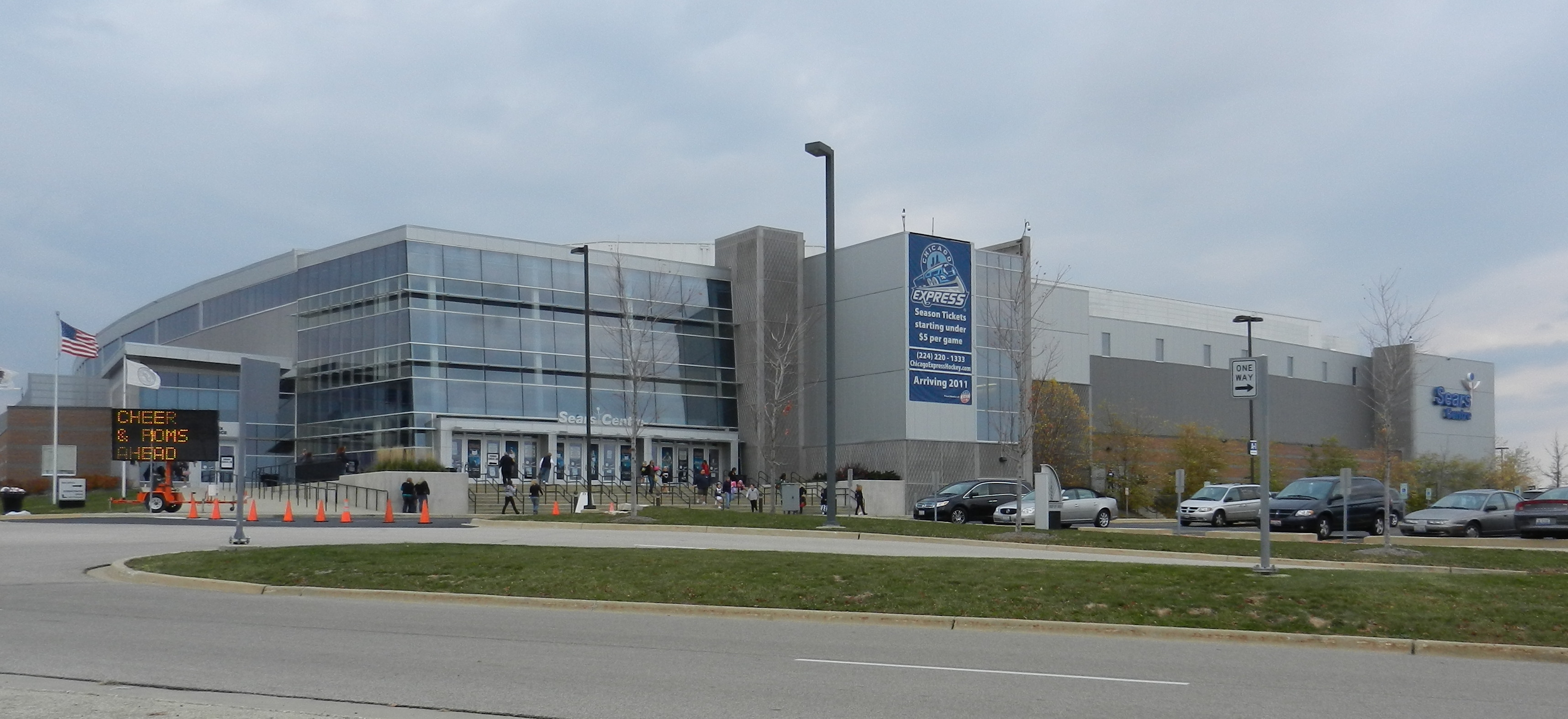
The event marked the fourth All Out to be held at the Now Arena in Hoffman Estates, Illinois, after 2019, 2021, and 2022.

All Out is an annual professional wrestling pay-per-view (PPV) event held by All Elite Wrestling (AEW) since 2019. It was originally held during Labor Day weekend and is one of AEW's "Big Four" PPVs, which also includes Double or Nothing, Full Gear, and Revolution, their four biggest domestic shows produced quarterly.

On April 11, 2024, AEW announced that the sixth All Out event would take place on Sunday, September 1, 2024, at the Now Arena in the Chicago suburb of Hoffman Estates, Illinois. However, on May 21, 2024, AEW announced that All Out would instead take place a week later on Saturday, September 7, 2024, marking the first All Out to not be held during Labor Day weekend. This change came in response to fan concerns of the event being held only one week after All In, which had occurred the prior year. This subsequently returned the event to Saturday for the first time since 2020 as well as to the Now Arena, being the fourth overall at the venue, after 2019, 2021, and 2022. Due to the event being held on Saturday, Collision and Rampage were held live back-to-back on Friday, September 6 in the Chicago area.

=== Storylines ===
All Out featured professional wrestling matches that were the result of pre-existing feuds and storylines, with results being predetermined by AEW's writers. Storylines were produced on AEW's weekly television programs, Dynamite, Collision, and Rampage.

On the July 10 episode of Dynamite, Pac defeated Claudio Castagnoli, Kyle Fletcher, and Tomohiro Ishii in a Global Glory Four-Way match to earn an AEW International Championship match at All Out. The following week, reigning champion Will Ospreay lost the title to MJF, who unofficially rebranded the title as the American Championship. Ospreay then regained the title at All In, restoring it as the International Championship and subsequently confirming that Ospreay would be the defending champion against Pac at All Out.

In late 2023, Willow Nightingale formed a tag team with Kris Statlander and they were managed by Stokely Hathaway. On May 26 at Double or Nothing, Statlander attacked Nightingale after the latter lost her match, thus ending their team with Hathaway siding with Statlander. They would continue to feud throughout the summer and during the All In Zero Hour pre-show on August 25, the team of Nightingale and Tomohiro Ishii defeated the team of Statlander and Hathaway in a mixed tag team match, thus allowing Nightingale and Ishii to choose the stipulation of a match between Nightingale and Statlander at All Out. They subsequently chose a Chicago Street Fight.

The feud between "Hangman" Adam Page and Swerve Strickland dates back to WrestleDream in October 2023. The two had faced each other at the event, which Strickland won. It became personal after Strickland broke into Page's house, including going into his sleeping kid's room. A rematch occurred at Full Gear in November as a Texas Death match, which Strickland also won. Both were then in a three-way match for the AEW World Championship at Revolution in March 2024, where Samoa Joe retained by submitting Page. Page subsequently disappeared from television while Strickland won the championship from Joe at Dynasty in April. Page then returned in July and entered the men's Owen Hart Foundation Tournament as the winner also earned a match for the AEW World Championship at All In, which meant a possible rematch with Strickland; however, Page was unsuccessful in the tournament. Strickland lost his title at All In, which Page observed, and on the subsequent Dynamite, Strickland confronted Page and the two agreed to a Steel Cage match at All Out. On the September 4 episode, a contract signing was to take place. While Strickland arrived to sign the contract, Page did not as he was shown at Strickland's childhood house, which Strickland had just recently purchased. Page proceeded to burn down the house as Strickland watched in horror. AEW president Tony Khan then decided that their Steel Cage match would also be an unsanctioned Lights Out match.

After MJF made his return from injury in May, he became friends with Daniel Garcia. However, after Garcia lost an AEW International Championship match to Will Ospreay at Dynamite: Beach Break, where MJF attempted to help Garcia cheat to win, MJF subsequently turned on Garcia, brutalizing him and taking him out for the next several weeks. MJF then faced and defeated Ospreay on the July 17 episode to win the title, which he unofficially rebranded as the American Championship. During MJF's defense against Ospreay at All In, a masked man attacked MJF, revealing himself as Garcia and subsequently allowing Ospreay to defeat MJF and win the title. On the following Dynamite, Garcia confronted MJF and they agreed to a match at All Out.

At All In, Bryan Danielson defeated Swerve Strickland in a Title vs. Career match to win the AEW World Championship. On the following episode of Dynamite, Danielson addressed his in-ring future, stating that he would remain as a full-time wrestler until he lost the championship. He also said he would take on any and all challengers. Jack Perry then interrupted, noting his pinfall victory over Danielson in the Anarchy in the Arena match at Double or Nothing in May, and subsequently challenged Danielson for the title at All Out, which was made official.

On the August 31 episode of Collision, Hikaru Shida defeated Queen Aminata, Thunder Rosa, and Serena Deeb in a four-way match to earn an AEW TBS Championship match against Mercedes Moné at All Out. During the September 4 episode of Dynamite, interim AEW Executive Vice President Christopher Daniels ruled that Moné's associate Kamille was banned from ringside.

== Event ==
Other on-screen personnel
Role	Name
Commentators	Excalibur (Pre-show and PPV)
Commentators	Tony Schiavone (Pre-show and PPV)
Commentators	Taz (PPV)
Commentators	Nigel McGuinness (PPV matches 5 through 7)
Commentators	Jim Ross (last 2 matches)
Commentators	Matt Menard (Pre-show and MJF vs. Garcia)
Commentators	Don Callis (Continental Title match)
Spanish Commentators	Alvaro Riojas
Spanish Commentators	Carlos Cabrera
Spanish Commentators	Ariel Levy
Ring announcers	Justin Roberts (PPV)
Ring announcers	Arkady Aura (Pre-show)
Referees	Aubrey Edwards
Referees	Bryce Remsburg
Referees	Mike Posey
Referees	Paul Turner
Referees	Rick Knox
Referees	Stephon Smith
Pre-show hosts	Renee Paquette
Pre-show hosts	RJ City
Pre-show hosts	Jeff Jarrett
Pre-show hosts	Madison Rayne

=== Zero Hour ===
The opening match on the Zero Hour show was contested between The Acclaimed and The Iron Savages, who were accompanied by their manager Jacked Jameson. In the end, Bowens hit the Acclaimed on Boulder and Caster hit the Mic Drop for the three count.

Next, Hologram, Sammy Guevara, and Dustin Rhodes took on The Premier Athletes (Tony Nese, Ari Daivari, and Josh Woods), accompanied by "Smart" Mark Sterling. In the end, Rhodes hit Woods with the Cross Rhodes and Sterling jumped on the apron only for Hologram and Guevara to drag him in the ring before Rhodes hit Sterling with the Cross Rhodes. With Sterling and Neese incapacitated, Rhodes hit the Final Reckoning on Woods for the victory.

After that, Bang Bang Gang (Austin Gunn, Colten Gunn, and Juice Robinson) faced off against The Dark Order (Evil Uno, Alex Reynolds, and John Silver). In the end, Robinson hit Uno with the Juice is loose for the win.

In the final match on the Zero Hour show it was a three-way tag team match between The Undisputed Kingdom (Matt Taven, Mike Bennett Roderick Strong) facing the team of The Beast Mortos and Shane Taylor Promotions (Shane Taylor Lee Moriarty) versus Action Andretti and Top Flight (Dante Martin and Darius Martin), who were accompanied by Leila Grey. In the end, Strong hit Andretti with a knee strike to pick up the win. After the match, Strong screamed into the camera, asking if Hook could see what he did.

=== Main show ===
In the opening match of the main show it was MJF facing Daniel Garcia. MJF made his entrance but Garcia ambushed him from the crowd. In the end, MJF delivered a low blow to Garcia and rolled him up for the win. After the match, MJF extended his hand to Garcia but MJF went for another low blow but Garcia countered it and low blowed MJF instead. Garcia positioned MJF on the top rope and delivered a piledriver off the top rope before going into the stands to celebrate.

After that, the AEW World Tag Team Champions The Young Bucks (Matthew Jackson and Nicholas Jackson) defended their titles against Blackpool Combat Club (Claudio Castagnoli and Wheeler Yuta). In the end, Claudio and Yuta attempted the Fast Ball Special but Matthew got his knees up and rolled Yuta up for the three count and retained the tag team championships in the process.

Next was the AEW International Championship match which saw Will Ospreay defend the title against Pac. In the end, Ospreay hit the Os-Cutter, followed by a Styles Clash and then a Hidden Blade for the victory.

Up next was the Chicago Street Fight between Kris Statlander, who was accompanied by Stokely Hathaway, against Willow Nightingale. In the end, Statlander hit Nightingale with a tombstone piledriver and wrapped a chain around Nightingale's face causing her to submit.

Next Renee Paquette interviewed Ricochet backstage but Will Ospreay interrupted but Ricochet told Ospreay he would see him soon.

After that it was the AEW Continental Championship Four-way match between Kazuchika Okada, Mark Briscoe, Orange Cassidy, and Konosuke Takeshita, who was accompanied by Don Callis. In the end, Okada hit Cassidy with the Rainmaker for the victory with him retaining his title in the process.

Up next was the AEW TBS Championship match between Mercedes Moné and Hikaru Shida with Kamille banned from ringside. In the end, Moné hit the Moné Maker for the victory and, in the process, retaining her title. After the match, Kamille came out to celebrate with Moné.

In the penultimate match it was the AEW World Championship match where Bryan Danielson faced AEW TNT Champion Jack Perry, although the TNT Championship was not on the line. In the end, Danielson hit the running knee strike on Perry for the win and retained his title.

After the match, Christian Cage along with his Patriarchy members came to ringside and Danielson's fellow Blackpool Combat Club member Jon Moxley appeared and confronted Cage and The Patriarchy and Castagnoli, Pac and Yuta soon came through the crowd to back Moxley up and defend Danielson. The Patriarchy then left ringside. In the ring, the Blackpool Combat Club embraced Danielson before Castagnoli performed an uppercut on Danielson. Moxley then retrieved a plastic bag and suffocated Danielson with it. A visibly upset Wheeler Yuta attempted to intervene, but Pac held him back while Moxley continued to suffocate Danielson and Marina Shafir appeared and held back referees, security and doctors from getting into the ring. After a while, the group left Danielson in the ring while Yuta checked on Danielson. Danielson was then stretchered out of the arena by medical personnel.

In the main event, "Hangman" Adam Page took on Swerve Strickland in a Lights Out Steel Cage match. Before the cage lowered, they got into a fight on the outside and Swerve's manager Prince Nana threw weapons in the ring and a toolbox. As they entered the ring to begin the match, the two grappled on the ring apron to try to catch the other in the descending cage; Nana pushed the two into the ring to avoid this. Page pulled a staple gun out of the toolbox and stapled Swerve. Swerve laughed and took the staple gun from Page and stapled him. He then took the staples out of his chest and stapled a picture to Page's face. Page then pulled a cinder block out of the toolbox and Swerve slammed him onto it. Page then got a burnt spike and tried to stab Swerve with it, but Swerve got it and stabbed Page in the face with it five times. Page then powerbombed Swerve onto the cinder block. In the end, Page hit Strickland with a steel chair then Page pulled the grill out of Strickland's mouth and shoved a hypodermic needle through Strickland's mouth which penetrated his cheek and then Page hit Strickland with a steel chair to the head, with so much force the seat broke, causing the referee to end the match and declare Page the winner by knockout. After the match, Page hesitated on which exit to leave by, eventually leaving by the heel exit.

== Reception ==
The event received positive reviews. Reviewing the event for TJR Wrestling, John Canton gave the show an overall score of 8.25. He called it overall "an excellent show", thought noted there was a lack of drama in several matches as "you know the champions are going to retain", specifically referring to the wins of Okada, Mone, The Young Bucks and Danielson. However, he praised the opening match between MJF and Daniel Garcia, and praised the post-match segment of the Danielson/Perry match, calling Moxley's heel turn "shocking." Writing for 411MANIA, Kevin Pantoja praised the event, giving it a 9.5 out of 10. He described the event overall as "a stellar night of wrestling", heaping praise on the Lights Out match, calling it "madness."

The match between PAC and Will Ospreay for the AEW International Championship received widespread acclaim, with some calling it one of the best matches of the year. Pantoja called it an "outstanding match", praising Ospreay for his consistency in PPV matches in 2024. Canton specifically called it one of the best matches of the year, praising Ospreay as "amazing" and calling PAC's work "incredible". Dave Meltzer, reviewing the show for the Wrestling Observer Newsletter, gave the match 5.5 stars, making it one of his highest rated matches of the year.

Names such as Jonathan Coachman, Ricky Morton, Dave Meltzer, and PWInsider criticized the main event for its violence in moments such as an unprotected chair shot to the head and the use of a hypodermic needle. On the other side, Nic Nemeth and Thunder Rosa supported the use of violence during the match.

== Results ==
No.	Results	Stipulations	Times
1^{P}	The Acclaimed (Anthony Bowens and Max Caster) (with Billy Gunn) defeated Iron Savages (Bronson and Boulder) (with Jacked Jameson) by pinfall	Tag team match	8:10
2^{P}	Hologram, Sammy Guevara, and Dustin Rhodes defeated The Premier Athletes (Tony Nese, Ari Daivari, and Josh Woods) (with "Smart" Mark Sterling) by pinfall	Trios match	9:50
3^{P}	Bang Bang Gang (Austin Gunn, Colten Gunn, and Juice Robinson) defeated The Dark Order (Evil Uno, Alex Reynolds, and John Silver) by pinfall	Trios match	7:35
4^{P}	The Undisputed Kingdom (Matt Taven, Mike Bennett, and Roderick Strong) defeated The Beast Mortos and Shane Taylor Promotions (Shane Taylor and Lee Moriarty) and Action Andretti and Top Flight (Dante Martin and Darius Martin) (with Leila Grey) by pinfall	Three-way trios match	10:55
5	MJF defeated Daniel Garcia by pinfall	Singles match	23:41
6	The Young Bucks (Matthew Jackson and Nicholas Jackson) (c) defeated Blackpool Combat Club (Claudio Castagnoli and Wheeler Yuta) by pinfall	Tag team match for the AEW World Tag Team Championship	15:44
7	Will Ospreay (c) defeated Pac by pinfall	Singles match for the AEW International Championship	20:20
8	Kris Statlander (with Stokely Hathaway) defeated Willow Nightingale by submission	Chicago Street Fight	15:00
9	Kazuchika Okada (c) defeated Mark Briscoe, Orange Cassidy, and Konosuke Takeshita (with Don Callis) by pinfall	Four-way match for the AEW Continental Championship	15:00
10	Mercedes Moné (c) defeated Hikaru Shida by pinfall	Singles match for the AEW TBS Championship; Kamille was banned from ringside.	16:30
11	Bryan Danielson (c) defeated Jack Perry by pinfall	Singles match for the AEW World Championship	27:31
12	"Hangman" Adam Page defeated Swerve Strickland (with Prince Nana) by knockout	Lights Out Steel Cage match	31:30
(c) / – the champion(s) heading into the match; P / – the match was broadcast on the pre-show
