= WrestleDream (2024) =

All Elite Wrestling pay-per-view event

- Promotional poster featuring various AEW wrestlers
- Promotion: All Elite Wrestling
- Date: October 12, 2024
- City: Tacoma, Washington
- Venue: Tacoma Dome
- Attendance: 8,045
- Buy rate: 105,000

Pay-per-view chronology
← Previous; All Out	Next → Full Gear

WrestleDream chronology
← Previous; 2023	Next → 2025

The 2024 WrestleDream was a professional wrestling pay-per-view (PPV) event produced by the American promotion All Elite Wrestling (AEW). It was the second annual WrestleDream and took place on October 12, 2024, at the Tacoma Dome in Tacoma, Washington. Like with the previous year's event, the show was held in honor of New Japan Pro-Wrestling (NJPW) founder Antonio Inoki, who died on October 1, 2022.

Thirteen matches were contested at the event, including four on the "Zero Hour" pre-show; the "Zero Hour" pre-show also included a memorial ceremony for Antonio with his grandsons Naoto and Hirota Inoki. In the main event, Jon Moxley defeated Bryan Danielson by technical submission to win the AEW World Championship, ending Danielson's full-time professional wrestling career. In other prominent matches, Konosuke Takeshita defeated previous champion Will Ospreay and Ricochet in a three-way match to win the AEW International Championship and in the opening bout, Jay White defeated "Hangman" Adam Page. The event was also notable for the returns of Adam Cole, MJF, and Swerve Strickland.

== Production ==
=== Background ===
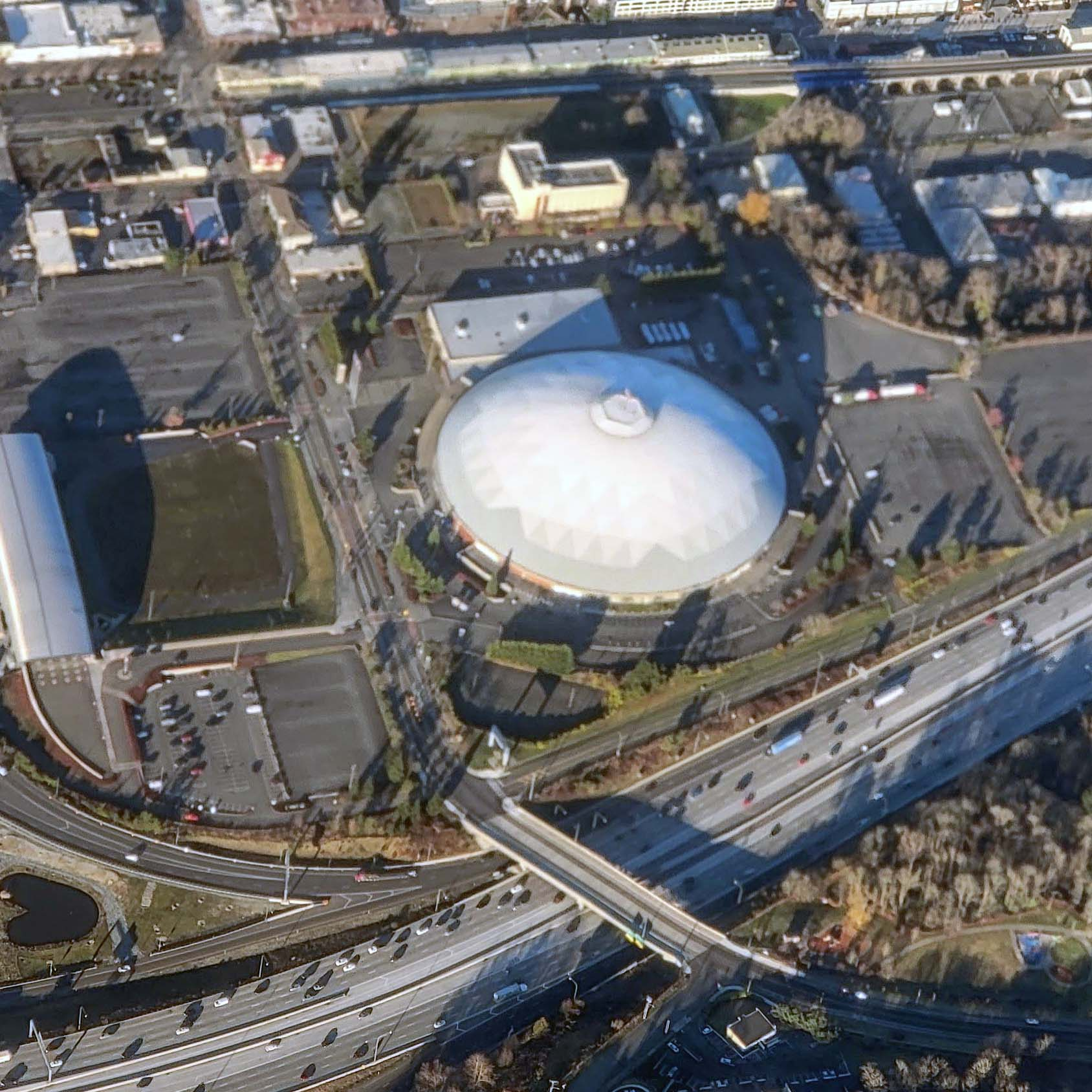
The second WrestleDream took place at the Tacoma Dome in Tacoma, Washington.

On October 1, 2022 (September 30 in Eastern Time), Antonio Inoki, the founder of the Japanese professional wrestling promotion New Japan Pro-Wrestling (NJPW), died. Prior to his death, the American promotion All Elite Wrestling (AEW) began a working partnership with NJPW in early 2021. This resulted in the annual co-promoted event, AEW x NJPW: Forbidden Door, which was first held in June 2022.

The inaugural WrestleDream event took place on October 1, 2023—the one-year anniversary of Inoki's death—at Climate Pledge Arena in Seattle, Washington, marking AEW's first PPV to be held in the state of Washington. The name of the event was a reference to Inoki, who AEW promoter Tony Khan called "wrestling's greatest dreamer". On April 11, 2024, AEW announced that the second WrestleDream would take place on October 12, 2024, at the Tacoma Dome in Tacoma, Washington, thus establishing WrestleDream as an annual PPV event.

=== Storylines ===
WrestleDream featured 13 professional wrestling matches, including four on the pre-show, that involved different wrestlers from pre-existing feuds and storylines. Storylines were produced on AEW's weekly television programs, Dynamite, Rampage, and Collision.

== Event ==
Other on-screen personnel
Role	Name
Commentators	Excalibur (Pre-show and PPV)
Commentators	Tony Schiavone (Pre-show and PPV)
Commentators	Nigel McGuinness (Pre-show and PPV)
Commentators	Jim Ross (last 2 matches)
Commentators	Don Callis (International Title match)
Spanish Commentators	Carlos Cabrera
Spanish Commentators	Alvaro Riojas
Spanish Commentators	Ariel Levy
Ring announcers	Justin Roberts
Ring announcers	Arkady Aura (Zero Hour and Hologram vs. Mortos)
Referees	Aubrey Edwards
Referees	Bryce Remsburg
Referees	Mike Posey
Referees	Paul Turner
Referees	Rick Knox
Referees	Stephon Smith
Interviewer	Alicia Atout
Pre-show hosts	Renee Paquette
Pre-show hosts	RJ City
Pre-show hosts	Jeff Jarrett
Pre-show hosts	Chuck Taylor
Pre-show hosts	Nyla Rose

=== Zero Hour ===
In the opening match on the Zero Hour show Atlantis Jr. defended the ROH World Television Championship against Brian Cage. In the end, Cage hit Atlantis Jr. with the Drill Claw and pinned him to pick up the victory and win the title.

Next Anna Jay took on Harley Cameron. In the end, Jay hit the Glory Bomb on Cameron and pinned her for the win.

Up next The Acclaimed (Anthony Bowens and Max Caster), who were accompanied by "Daddy Ass" Billy Gunn, took on MxM Collection (Mansoor and Mason Madden), who were accompanied by Rico). In the end, Bowens jumped off the top rope and took out MxM Collection on the outside while Rico went for a spin kick on Gunn at ringside only for Gunn to counter into a Fame Asser then Bowens, in the ring, hit Mansoor with the Acclaimed and Caster hit the Mic Drop on Mansoor for the three count.

After that AEW President Tony Khan came out with the grandsons of Antonio Inoki and encouraged the crowd to chant.

In the final match on the Zero Hour show it was an Eight-man tag team match between The Conglomeration (Orange Cassidy and Kyle O'Reilly) and The Outrunners (Turbo Floyd and Truth Magnum), accompanied by Rocky Romero), against The Dark Order (Alex Reynolds and John Silver) and The Premier Athletes (Ariya Daivari and Tony Nese), who were accompanied by "Smart" Mark Sterling, Josh Woods, and Evil Uno). In the end, The Outrunners performed a neckbreaker and a powerslam on Daivari for the win.

Next Renee Paquette interviewed Kazuchika Okada backstage. Okada revealed he was medically cleared but Kyle O'Reilly confronted him and challenged him to a match for the AEW Continental Championship. Okada refused and insulted O'Reilly and O'Reilly resorted to punching Okada and a brawl broke out until Christopher Daniels and security broke it up and ordered both men to be ejected from the arena.

=== Main Show ===
In the opening match on the main show Jay White, who came out with Juice Robinson, went up against "Hangman" Adam Page. In the end, Page attempted a Buckshot Lariat but White countered into a Blade Runner for the victory. After the match, Robinson came down to the ring and celebrated with White.

Next was the AEW Women's Championship match where Mariah May defended her title against Willow Nightingale. In the end, May performed an avalanche hurracanrana on Nightingale before delivering a knee strike to Nightingale and then May performed Storm Zero on Nightingale for the victory and retained her title in the process.

After that was the AEW TNT Championship match where Jack Perry defended the championship against Katsuyori Shibata. In the end, Shibata had Perry in a sleeper hold and eventually fell backwards and Shibata put his legs around Perry's torso but Perry fell back and the referee counted the pin as Shibata's shoulders were down thus Perry retained the title.

After winning, Perry hit Shibata with the title only for Daniel Garcia to come out and confront Perry. MJF, who had last been seen at All Out the previous month, came out and confronted Garcia before Perry hit Garcia in the back with the championship and left. MJF proceeded to remove his suit and attack Garcia. MJF then grabbed a microphone and after insulting Garcia he said that he had found his Dynamite Diamond Ring and that it was in a Pawn shop in Buffalo and that Garcia was going to kiss it. All of a sudden, Adam Cole, who had last been seen at Double or Nothing, appeared on the ramp and sprinted towards the ring while MJF retreated. Cole then had a staredown with MJF while MJF was in the stands.

Up next was the AEW International Championship three-way match where Will Ospreay defended his championship against Ricochet and Konosuke Takeshita, who was accompanied by Don Callis. In the end, Takeshita performed a piledriver to Ricochet through a table at ringside before getting into the ring and being hit by a Hidden Blade by Ospreay but Takeshita kicked out at one. Ospreay hit Takeshita with another Hidden Blade but Callis pulled the referee out of the ring. Callis got out a screwdriver and intended to hit Ospreay with it but Ospreay caught Callis and attempted to hit him with the Tiger Driver '91 but a man in a hoodie came into the ring and hit Ospreay in the back of the head with the screwdriver. The man was then revealed to be Kyle Fletcher. Takeshita got up and hit a knee strike on Ospreay and pinned him for the three count, winning the title in the process. After the match, Fletcher gave Ospreay a Tiger Driver '91.

After that Jerry Lynn was interviewed backstage by Renee Paquette with Orange Cassidy. Lynn said he has never seen a wrestler like Cassidy and said that he could be the man. Hook then approached Cassidy and said he was the man and they fist bumped.

Next Prince Nana introduced Swerve Strickland who had not been seen since All Out. MVP and Shelton Benjamin confronted them both and MVP offered Strickland his services but after consideration Strickland refused and a physical confrontation broke out but security and referees broke it up.

Up next was the two out of three falls match between Hologram and The Beast Mortos. Hologram performed a crucifix pin on Mortos which ended in the first fall. Mortos would then perform a discus lariat on Hologram and pinned him to earn the second fall, meaning it was sudden death. In the end, Hologram performed a super hurracanrana on Mortos and hit Mortos with a swan diving crucifix bomb for a near fall but quickly lifted Mortos up for the Portal Bomb and pinned him for the three count, earning the third fall and winning the match.

The next match was Darby Allin facing off against Brody King. In the end, Allin shoved King off the apron onto some steel steps at ringside and delivered a Coffin Drop to King. King crawled into the ring where Allin delivered another Coffin Drop and Allin pinned King for the win. After the match, King extended his hand to Allin and they shook hands.

The Young Bucks (Matthew Jackson and Nicholas Jackson) defended the AEW World Tag Team Championship against Private Party (Zay and Quen). Stokely Hathaway and Top Flight (Dante Martin and Darius Martin) and Action Andretti and Leila Grey were shown sitting at ringside. In the end, The Young Bucks hit the TK Driver on Zay and pinned him for the victory, retaining their tag team championships in the process.

In the penultimate match Mark Briscoe defended his ROH World Championship against Chris Jericho. In the end, Briscoe performed Jay Driller on Jericho for the win thus retaining his championship.

=== Main Event ===
In the main event Bryan Danielson defended his AEW World Championship against Jon Moxley, who was accompanied by Marina Shafir. During the match, Shafir was ejected from ringside by referee Bryce Remsburg. In the end, Danielson slapped Moxley and Moxley performed a piledriver and put a sleeper hold on Danielson who passed out winning the match and the championship.

After the match, Shafir, Claudio Castagnoli and Pac came down to the ring and locked the AEW World Championship in a briefcase then placed it in a black bag. Moxley then retrieved a plastic bag and attempted to suffocate Danielson again, just liked he did a month prior at All Out, but Darby Allin and Wheeler Yuta came into the ring and attempted to stop Moxley. All of a sudden Yuta hit Allin with a running knee strike and Pac restrained Allin in the corner. Yuta grabbed the plastic bag and suffocated Danielson while Allin pleaded for Yuta to stop. Private Party and Jeff Jarrett attempted to come to Danielson's aid but were attacked by Moxley, Castagnoli and Shafir and were stopped from getting into the ring. Then the rest of the locker room came out and Moxley, Castagnoli, Pac, Shafir and Yuta retreated through the stands while AEW medical personnel stretchered Danielson out of the arena.

== Results ==
No.	Results	Stipulations	Times
1^{P}	Brian Cage defeated Atlantis Jr. (c) by pinfall	Singles match for the ROH World Television Championship	11:00
2^{P}	Anna Jay defeated Harley Cameron by pinfall	Singles match	8:20
3^{P}	The Acclaimed (Anthony Bowens and Max Caster) (with "Daddy Ass" Billy Gunn) defeated MxM Collection (Mansoor and Mason Madden) (with Rico) by pinfall	Tag team match	11:25
4^{P}	The Conglomeration (Orange Cassidy and Kyle O'Reilly) and The Outrunners (Turbo Floyd and Truth Magnum) (with Rocky Romero) defeated The Dark Order (Alex Reynolds and John Silver) and The Premier Athletes (Ariya Daivari and Tony Nese) (with "Smart" Mark Sterling, Josh Woods, and Evil Uno) by pinfall	Eight-man tag team match	11:30
5	Jay White defeated "Hangman" Adam Page by pinfall	Singles match	16:20
6	Mariah May (c) defeated Willow Nightingale by pinfall	Singles match for the AEW Women's World Championship	10:50
7	Jack Perry (c) defeated Katsuyori Shibata by pinfall	Singles match for the AEW TNT Championship	9:20
8	Konosuke Takeshita (with Don Callis) defeated Will Ospreay (c) and Ricochet by pinfall	Three-way match for the AEW International Championship	20:45
9	Hologram defeated The Beast Mortos 2–1	Two out of three falls match	16:40
10	Darby Allin defeated Brody King by pinfall	Singles match	12:20
11	The Young Bucks (Matthew Jackson and Nicholas Jackson) (c) defeated Private Party (Zay and Quen) by pinfall	Tag team match for the AEW World Tag Team Championship	15:50
12	Mark Briscoe (c) defeated Chris Jericho (with Big Bill) by pinfall	Singles match for the ROH World Championship	15:20
13	Jon Moxley (with Marina Shafir) defeated Bryan Danielson (c) by technical submission	Singles match for the AEW World Championship	27:00
(c) / – the champion(s) heading into the match; P / – the match was broadcast on the pre-show
