= WrestleDream (2025) =

All Elite Wrestling pay-per-view event

- Promotional poster featuring Kris Statlander, Samoa Joe, "Hangman" Adam Page, "Timeless" Toni Storm, Jon Moxley, and Darby Allin
- Promotion: All Elite Wrestling
- Date: October 18, 2025
- City: St. Louis, Missouri
- Venue: Chaifetz Arena
- Attendance: 6,293
- Buy rate: 120,000

Pay-per-view chronology
← Previous; All Out	Next → Full Gear

WrestleDream chronology
← Previous; 2024	Next → 2026

The 2025 WrestleDream was a professional wrestling pay-per-view (PPV) event produced by All Elite Wrestling (AEW). It was the third annual WrestleDream and took place on October 18, 2025, at the Chaifetz Arena in St. Louis, Missouri. This was AEW's second PPV event held at the venue, after Dynasty in April 2024, and the first WrestleDream to take place outside of the U.S. state of Washington. The annual event is a memorial for New Japan Pro-Wrestling founder Antonio Inoki, with the 2025 event also honoring St. Louis Wrestling Hall of Famer Lou Thesz and professional wrestling in St. Louis, including legends Harley Race, Larry "The Axe" Hennig, and "Cowboy" Bob Orton Jr..

Thirteen matches were contested at the event, including four on the Tailgate Brawl pre-show. In the main event, Darby Allin defeated Jon Moxley in an "I Quit" match. In other prominent matches, "Hangman" Adam Page defeated Samoa Joe to retain the AEW World Championship, Brodido (Brody King and Bandido) defeated The Don Callis Family (Kazuchika Okada and Konosuke Takeshita) to retain the AEW World Tag Team Championship, and Kris Statlander defeated "Timeless" Toni Storm to retain the AEW Women's World Championship. The event also featured the return of Sting.

== Production ==
=== Background ===
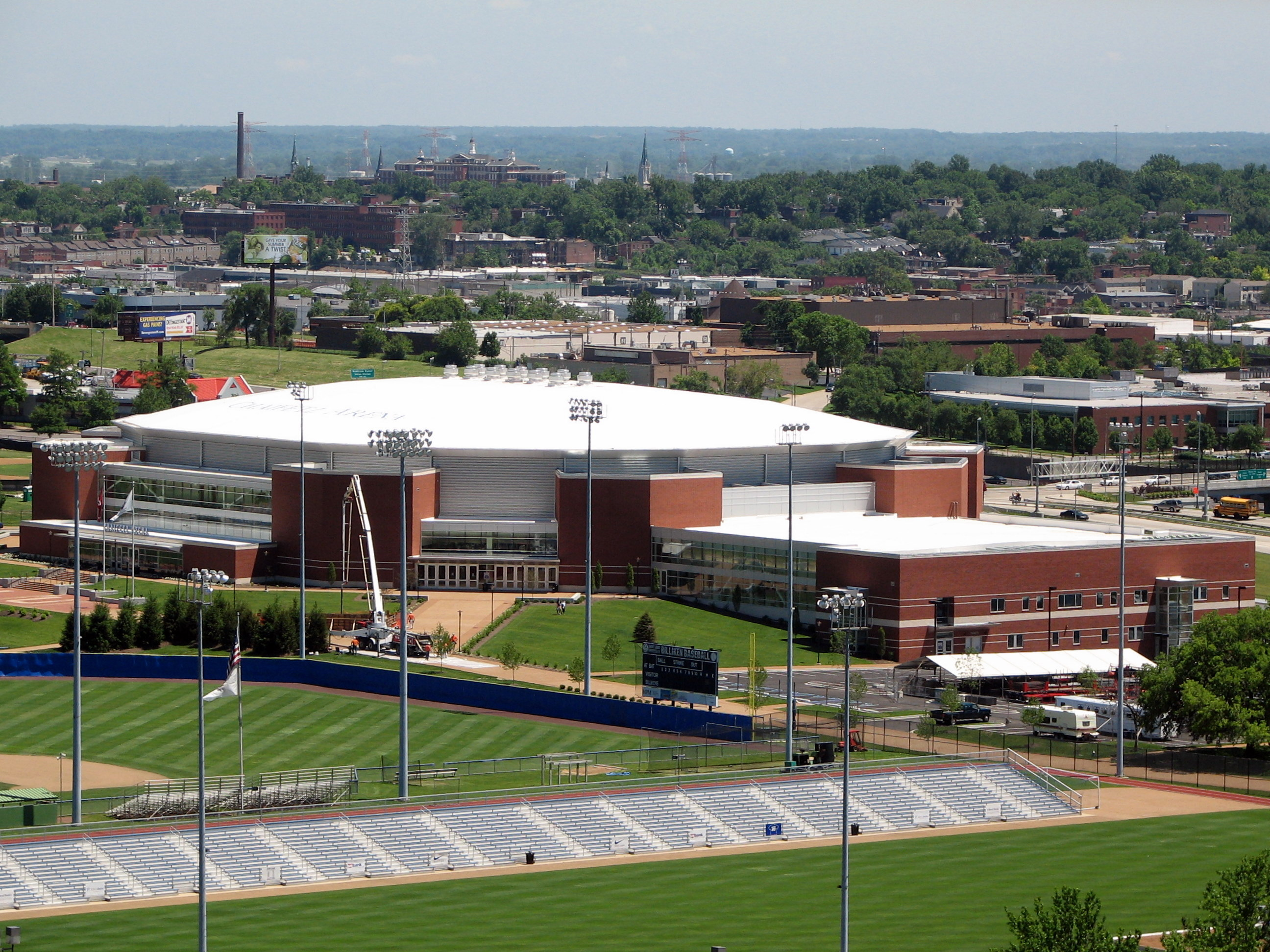
The event was held at the Chaifetz Arena in St. Louis, Missouri.

WrestleDream is an annual professional wrestling pay-per-view (PPV) event produced every October by the American promotion All Elite Wrestling (AEW) since 2023. The event is held in honor of Antonio Inoki, the founder of AEW's Japanese partner promotion New Japan Pro-Wrestling (NJPW), who died in October 2022. The name of the event is a reference to Inoki, who AEW owner Tony Khan called "wrestling's greatest dreamer".

On July 21, 2025, AEW announced that the third WrestleDream would take place on October 18, 2025, at the Chaifetz Arena in St. Louis, Missouri. This marked the promotion's second PPV event to take place at the venue, following Dynasty in April 2024, as well as the first WrestleDream to take place outside of the U.S. state of Washington. Tickets for WrestleDream went on sale July 28. In addition to being a memorial show for Inoki, the 2025 event honored St. Louis Wrestling Hall of Famer Lou Thesz and professional wrestling in St. Louis.

=== Broadcast ===
Other on-screen personnel
Role	Name
Commentators	Excalibur
Commentators	Tony Schiavone
Commentators	Nigel McGuinness
Commentators	Matt Menard (Eight-man tag)
Commentators	Don Callis (TNT and World Tag Team Championship)
Spanish commentators	Carlos Cabrera
Spanish commentators	Alvaro Riojas
Spanish commentators	Ariel Levy
Ring announcers	Arkady Aura
Ring announcers	Justin Roberts
Referees	Aubrey Edwards
Referees	Brandon Martinez
Referees	Bryce Remsburg
Referees	Mike Posey
Referees	Paul Turner
Referees	Rick Knox
Referees	Stephon Smith
Pre-show hosts	Renee Paquette
Pre-show hosts	RJ City
Pre-show hosts	Jeff Jarrett

WrestleDream was broadcast on multiple platforms worldwide. In the United States, the event was livestreamed on HBO Max, Prime Video, Fubo, PPV.com, and YouTube. HBO Max subscribers received an exclusive discounted price of $39.99, compared to $49.99 on other platforms. It also aired on Prime Video in Canada, France, Germany, and the United Kingdom, and on YouTube in Canada, South Korea, France, Japan, Italy, Brazil, Germany, and the United Kingdom. Pay-per-view events are also available via traditional cable and satellite providers, including DirecTV, Sling TV, and Dish Network in the United States, Puerto Rico, and the U.S. Virgin Islands. Select international markets had access through TrillerTV and PPV.com.

Following the October 15 episodes of Dynamite and Collision, TNT and HBO Max aired Countdown to WrestleDream. The Saturday Tailgate Brawl pre-show took place at 7:00 p.m. Eastern Time (ET), which was simulcast on TNT and HBO Max.

=== Storylines ===
WrestleDream featured 13 professional wrestling matches that involved different wrestlers from pre-existing feuds and storylines. Storylines were produced on AEW's weekly television programs, Dynamite and Collision.

At Dynamite: Grand Slam on September 25, 2024, Jon Moxley defeated Darby Allin for Allin's AEW World Championship opportunity at the 2024 WrestleDream. At Rampage: New Year's Smash on December 27, 2024, Moxley and the Death Riders (Claudio Castagnoli, Marina Shafir, Pac, and Wheeler Yuta) attacked Allin and threw him down a stairwell, taking him out of action for several months. Allin would make his return at All In: Texas on July 12, 2025, repelling from the ceiling and helping fend off the Death Riders during Moxley's AEW World Championship defense in the main event, which he lost to "Hangman" Adam Page. At Forbidden Door on August 24, Allin took part in a Lights Out Steel Cage match, in a team captained by Will Ospreay and they would defeat the opposing team featuring Castagnoli and captained by Moxley. At All Out on September 20, 2025, Allin was defeated by Moxley in a coffin match when returning Death Riders member, Pac, attacked Allin and cost him the victory. Later that same night, Allin emerged from the coffin backstage and attacked Moxley with a steel pipe, zipped him up inside of a body bag, and lit the body bag containing Moxley on fire. On the following Dynamite on September 24, Allin, armed with a flamethrower, confronted Jon Moxley and challenged him to an "I Quit" match for WrestleDream, and the match was made official.

During the Dynamite 6th Anniversary Show on October 1, 2025, AEW World Champion "Hangman" Adam Page teamed with two-thirds of the AEW World Trios Champions The Opps (Samoa Joe and Powerhouse Hobbs) to defeat the Death Riders (Jon Moxley, Claudio Castagnoli, and Daniel Garcia) in a trios match. Following the match, an argument ensued between Page and Joe, with Joe accusing Page of stealing his tag-in and trying to show him up during the match. Joe then vehemently stated that Page has never beaten him in the past, before striking Page in the face. This led to Page challenging Joe to a match at WrestleDream for Page's World Championship, which Joe accepted.

At All Out on September 20, 2025, Kris Statlander won the AEW Women's World Champion in a four-way match by pinning defending champion "Timeless" Toni Storm. During the Dynamite 6th Anniversary Show on October 1, Storm challenged Statlander to a one-on-one match for the title, which Statlander accepted for WrestleDream.

== Reception ==
The "I Quit" match included a spot where Moxley attempted to drown Allin in a fish tank. The spot was criticized by former AEW coach Sarah Stock, being worried about the violence being emulated by children. On the other hand, Bully Ray defended the spot, stating "Everybody knows what they're getting with AEW".

== Results ==
No.	Results	Stipulations	Times
1^{P}	Death Riders (Claudio Castagnoli, Daniel Garcia, Pac, and Wheeler Yuta) defeated Roderick Strong and The Conglomeration (Kyle O'Reilly, Orange Cassidy, and Tomohiro Ishii) by pinfall	Eight-man tag team match	15:30
2^{P}	Eddie Kingston and Hook defeated The Frat House (Cole Karter and Griff Garrison) (with Jacked Jameson) by pinfall	Tag team match	3:00
3^{P}	Harley Cameron and Willow Nightingale defeated Top Gods (Megan Bayne and Penelope Ford) by pinfall	Tag team match	12:00
4^{P}	FTR (Cash Wheeler and Dax Harwood) (with Stokely) defeated JetSpeed ("Speedball" Mike Bailey and Kevin Knight) by pinfall (Note: This match concluded on the main card.)	Tag team match	13:00
5	Jamie Hayter defeated Thekla by pinfall	Singles match Everyone was banned from ringside.	15:35
6	Jurassic Express (Jack Perry and Luchasaurus) defeated The Young Bucks (Matt Jackson and Nick Jackson) by pinfall	$500K Tag team match The winners received a $500,000 cash prize.	21:35
7	The Hurt Syndicate (Bobby Lashley, Shelton Benjamin, and MVP) defeated The Demand (Ricochet, Bishop Kaun, and Toa Liona) by pinfall	Tornado Trios match to determine the #1 contender for the AEW World Trios Championship	13:30
8	Kyle Fletcher (c) (with Don Callis) defeated Mark Briscoe by pinfall	Singles match for the AEW TNT Championship	24:45
9	Kris Statlander (c) defeated "Timeless" Toni Storm by pinfall	Singles match for the AEW Women's World Championship	16:35
10	Mercedes Moné (TBS) defeated Mina Shirakawa (ROH) by pinfall	Winner Takes All match for the AEW TBS Championship and Interim ROH Women's World Television Championship; This was an open challenge.	16:10
11	Brodido (Bandido and Brody King) (c) defeated Don Callis Family (Kazuchika Okada and Konosuke Takeshita) (with Don Callis) by pinfall	Tag team match for the AEW World Tag Team Championship	27:25
12	"Hangman" Adam Page (c) defeated Samoa Joe by pinfall	Singles match for the AEW World Championship	19:00
13	Darby Allin defeated Jon Moxley (with Marina Shafir)	"I Quit" match	25:25
(c) / – the champion(s) heading into the match; P / – the match was broadcast on the pre-show
