= WrestleDream (2026) =

All Elite Wrestling pay-per-view event

- Promotional poster featuring various AEW wrestlers
- Promotion: All Elite Wrestling
- Date: October 17, 2026
- City: Orlando, Florida (Note: The venue is on the main campus of the University of Central Florida, which has an Orlando mailing address but is located to the east of the city in unincorporated Orange County.)
- Venue: Addition Financial Arena
- Attendance: 7,173

Pay-per-view chronology
← Previous; All Out	Next → Full Gear

WrestleDream chronology
← Previous; 2025	Next → —

The 2026 WrestleDream, also promoted as WrestleDream: Orlando, was a professional wrestling pay-per-view (PPV) event produced by All Elite Wrestling (AEW). It was the fourth annual WrestleDream and took place on Saturday, October 17, 2026, at the Addition Financial Arena near Orlando, Florida. This was AEW's third PPV event held at the venue, after Revolution in March 2022 and Worlds End in December 2024.

Twelve matches were contested at the event, including four on the Tailgate Brawl pre-show. In the main event, Will Ospreay defeated Samoa Joe, "Speedball" Mike Bailey, Adam Copeland, Konosuke Takeshita, Kazuchika Okada, Ricochet, and Darby Allin in the first-ever Clockwork Carnage match to retain the AEW World Championship. In other prominent matches, "Hangman" Adam Page and Brodido (Brody King and Bandido) defeated Swerve Strickland and The New Level (Austin Creed and Kofi) by 2–1 in a two out of three falls match to win the AEW World Trios Championship, and Mercedes Moné defeated Thekla to retain the AEW Women's World Championship. The event also featured the AEW debut of Ilja Dragunov.

== Production ==
=== Background ===
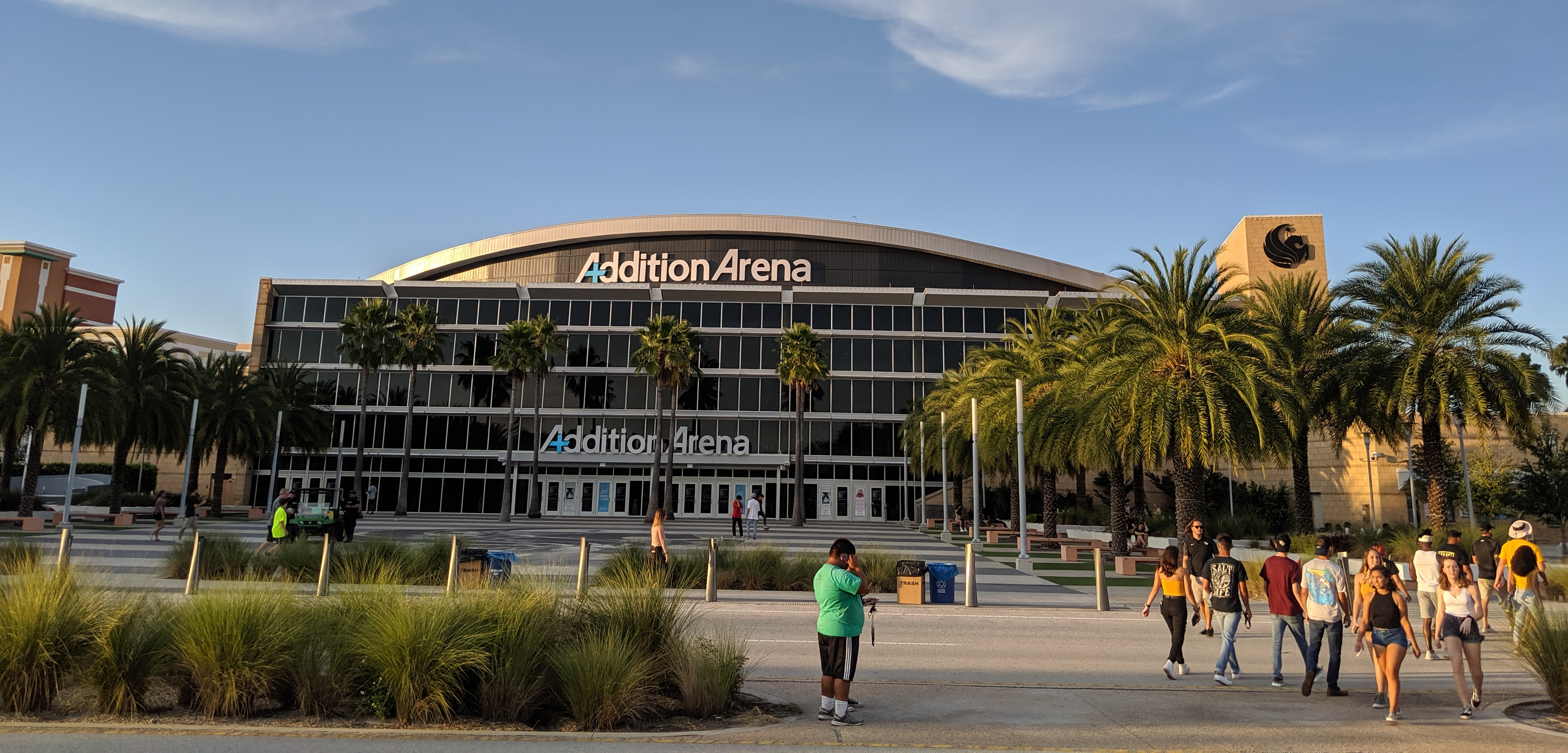
The fourth annual WrestleDream was held at the Addition Financial Arena near Orlando, Florida.

WrestleDream is an annual professional wrestling pay-per-view (PPV) event produced every October by the American promotion All Elite Wrestling (AEW) since 2023. The event is held in honor of Antonio Inoki, the founder of AEW's Japanese partner promotion New Japan Pro-Wrestling (NJPW), who died in October 2022. The name of the event is a reference to Inoki, who AEW owner Tony Khan called "wrestling's greatest dreamer".

On August 3, 2026, AEW announced that the fourth WrestleDream would take place on October 17, 2026, at Addition Financial Arena on the campus of the University of Central Florida near Orlando. This marked the promotion's third PPV event to take place at the venue, following Revolution in March 2022 and Worlds End in December 2024. Tickets for WrestleDream went on sale on August 10.

=== Storylines ===
Other on-screen personnel
Role	Name
Commentators	Excalibur (Pre-show and PPV)
Commentators	Tony Schiavone (Pre-show and PPV)
Commentators	Paul Wight (Pre-show and PPV)
Commentators	Nigel McGuinness (PPV)
Commentators	Don Callis (World Tag Team title match)
Spanish Commentators	Carlos Cabrera
Spanish Commentators	Alvaro Riojas
Spanish Commentators	Ariel Levy
Ring announcers	Justin Roberts (PPV)
Ring announcers	Arkady Aura (Pre-show and PPV)
Referees	Aubrey Edwards
Referees	Brandon Martinez
Referees	Bryce Remsburg
Referees	Mike Posey
Referees	Paul Turner
Referees	Rick Knox
Referees	Stephon Smith
Pre-show hosts	Renee Paquette
Pre-show hosts	RJ City
Pre-show hosts	Jeff Jarrett

WrestleDream featured professional wrestling matches that involved different wrestlers from pre-existing feuds and storylines. Storylines were produced on AEW's weekly television programs, Dynamite and Collision.

==== Clockwork Carnage ====
On the October 3 episode of Collision, Tony Schiavone announced that the AEW World Championship would be defended at WrestleDream in a "Clockwork Carnage" match, an eight-man hybrid of a gauntlet match and iron man match created by current champion Will Ospreay. The rules of the match are as follows:

- 2 wrestlers start the match, selected at random
- Every 3 minutes, another randomly selected wrestler enters
- Until all 8 wrestlers have entered, any wrestler who is pinned or submitted is eliminated
- Once the final wrestler enters, all remaining wrestlers enter a 15-minute scoring phase
- During those 15 minutes, every pinfall or submission scores one fall
- When time expires, the wrestler with the most falls wins

Qualifying matches began at Grand Slam France, where during the Dynamite portion on October 6, the returning Samoa Joe defeated Jack Perry to advance; in the main event, Ospreay defeated AEW International Champion Kazuchika Okada to enter the match as champion. On the Collision portion of Grand Slam France on October 10, "Speedball" Mike Bailey defeated Lee Moriarty to become the third man to qualify. Qualifying would conclude on the October 14 combined Dynamite/Collision where the final five men were decided: Adam Copeland defeated Josh Alexander, Konosuke Takeshita defeated Brian Cage, Okada retained his title over Myron Reed, Ricochet defeated Ace Austin, and Darby Allin retained the AEW TNT Championship against Hechicero.

==== Other matches ====
On the September 9 Rebel Heart edition of Dynamite, Kevin Knight and Kyle Fletcher of The Don Callis Family defeated The Young Bucks (Matt Jackson and Nick Jackson) in a tables match. Over two weeks later at All Out, Knight and Fletcher defeated Darby Allin and Steven Borden by stoppage to become the number one contenders to the AEW World Tag Team Championship (Borden was concussed following a botched spot which led to the stoppage). Later that night, The Young Bucks would win their record-setting fourth AEW World Tag Team Championship after defeating FTR (Cash Wheeler and Dax Harwood) and champions Adam Copeland and Christian Cage in a ladder match. On the October 3 Collision, it was announced that Knight and Fletcher would challenge The Young Bucks for the titles at WrestleDream. At the Grand Slam France Collision, The Young Bucks defended the titles against The Dogs (David Finlay and Clark Connors) to remain champions going into WrestleDream.

At Redemption, Willow Nightingale defeated Thekla to win the AEW Women's World Championship, setting up a match against Women's Owen Hart Cup winner Mercedes Moné at All In. Thekla, meanwhile, would be away from AEW before returning at All In and declaring she would watch the women's championship match. Moné would go on to win the title from Nightingale but had suffered a broken nose in the process. The injury would prevent Moné from competing at the following month's All Out, prompting a match between Thekla and Nightingale with the winner facing Moné for the AEW Women's World Championship at WrestleDream; Thekla would win the match. At Grand Slam France Dynamite, Moné retained her title over Queen Aminata to remain champion heading into WrestleDream.

At All In, AEW World Trios Champions "Hangman" Adam Page and Brodido (Brody King and Bandido) defended their titles in a Trios Roulette Royale. The match and titles were ultimately won by Swerve Strickland and his mystery partners, The New Level (Austin Creed and Kofi) (formerly Xavier Woods and Kofi Kingston of The New Day in WWE). The two teams would have a normal trios match for the titles at All Out, with Strickland and The New Level retaining. At Grand Slam France Dynamite, Bandido retained the ROH World Championship against Kofi, despite the heated arguments between Strickland and Page occurring on the outside. In a backstage vignette, Strickland and The New Level challenged Page and Brodido to a two out of three falls match for the AEW World Trios Championship at WrestleDream, which was later confirmed.

At All In, Jericho and Nick Wayne competed in the Casino Gauntlet match for a contract for an AEW World Championship match. The final moments saw Wayne kick Jericho out of the ring only to be pinned by the eventual winner, AEW National Champion Andrade El Ídolo. On the subsequent episode of Dynamite, Jericho noted backstage he technically did not lose as Wayne got pinned, which the latter did not take kindly to, leading to a brawl that ended with Wayne hitting a low blow on Jericho. This led to a match two weeks later, during which Jericho unintentionally snapped off Wayne's puka shell necklace, which distracted Wayne long enough for Jericho to pin him. However, when Jericho tried to show respect, a distraught Wayne attacked Jericho and laid him out with a chair. This set up a rematch between the two at Grand Slam France Collision, which Wayne won in a match where he hit another low blow on Jericho. On the October 14 combined Dynamite/Collision, Jericho confronted Wayne to challenge him to a rubber match at WrestleDream, promising to apologize to Wayne for destroying his necklace if he loses. Wayne would accept, only for Jericho to hit him with a low blow.

At Grand Slam France Dynamite, Mark Davis and Jake Doyle of the Don Callis Family defeated Gabe Kidd and AEW Continental Champion Jon Moxley of the Death Riders, with Davis pinning Kidd. Immediately following this, it was announced that Davis would challenge Moxley for his title at WrestleDream. The following week on the combined Dynamite/Collision, a trios match was held between the Death Riders (Moxley, Kidd, and Daniel Garcia) and the Don Callis Family (Davis, Doyle, and Wardlow), which the latter team won when Davis pinned Moxley.

At Grand Slam France Collision, Andrade El Ídolo retained the AEW National Championship against Michael Oku. However, after the match, he would be confronted and attacked by Tommaso Ciampa. The following week, Ciampa and Samoa Joe would defeat Andrade and AEW World Champion Will Ospreay in a tag team match; the closing moments saw Ciampa plant Andrade onto a title belt before Joe locked him into a submission. It was then announced that Ciampa would challenge Andrade for the AEW National Championship at WrestleDream.

During the combined Dynamite/Collision episode on October 14, FTR (Cash Wheeler and Dax Harwood) lamented not being the number one contenders for the AEW World Tag Team Championship when they were confronted by Motor City Machine Guns (Alex Shelley and Chris Sabin). The latter team proposed they face FTR in a best of five series, beginning that night. However, FTR's manager Stokely rebutted that they would begin their series at WrestleDream. The first match in the series was later confirmed for the Saturday Tailgate Brawl before the event.

==== Cancelled match ====
During the Grand Slam France special episode of Collision, Wrathlander (Harley Cameron and Kris Statlander) defeated Divine Dominion (Lena Kross and Megan Bayne) and Sisters of Sin (Julia Hart and Skye Blue) to earn an AEW Women's World Tag Team Championship match at WrestleDream, challenging The Brawling Birds (Jamie Hayter and Alex Windsor) for the titles. However, on October 15, 2026, Tony Khan posted a statement to his X account revealing that Hayter had suffered an injury at All Out and would not be cleared to compete at WrestleDream. The title match was then postponed to a later date, while a match between Divine Dominion and Sisters of Sin was announced for the Saturday Tailgate Brawl pre-show.

== Results ==
No.	Results	Stipulations	Times
1^{P}	Divine Dominion (Lena Kross and Megan Bayne) defeated Sisters of Sin (Julia Hart and Skye Blue) by pinfall	Tag team match	9:30
2^{P}	The Don Callis Family (Jake Doyle, Josh Alexander, and Wardlow) (with Rocky Romero and Trent Beretta) defeated Alex Breeze, Papi D, and Rhys Maddox by pinfall	Trios match	2:45
3^{P}	Death Riders (Claudio Castagnoli, Daniel Garcia, Gabe Kidd, and Wheeler Yuta) and The Dogs (David Finlay and Clark Connors) (with Marina Shafir) defeated Bang Bang Gang (Jay White, Austin Gunn, and Colten Gunn) and The Conglomeration (Orange Cassidy, Kyle O'Reilly, and Roderick Strong) (with Willow Nightingale) by pinfall	12-man tag team match	11:00
4^{P}	Motor City Machine Guns (Alex Shelley and Chris Sabin) defeated FTR (Cash Wheeler and Dax Harwood) (with Stokely) by pinfall (Note: The match concluded on the main card.)	Tag team match Match one in a best of five series.	26:05
5	Mercedes Moné (c) defeated Thekla by pinfall	Singles match for the AEW Women's World Championship	15:00
6	Nick Wayne defeated Jericho by pinfall	Singles match	14:50
7	The Young Bucks (Matt Jackson and Nick Jackson) (c) defeated The Don Callis Family (Kevin Knight and Kyle Fletcher) (with Don Callis) by pinfall	Tag team match for the AEW World Tag Team Championship	22:40
8	Persephone (c) defeated Dani Luna, Hyan, and Queen Aminata by pinfall	Four-way match for the AEW TBS Championship	14:30
9	Andrade El Ídolo (c) defeated Tommaso Ciampa by pinfall	Singles match for the AEW National Championship	21:00
10	"Hangman" Adam Page and Brodido (Brody King and Bandido) defeated Swerve Strickland and The New Level (Austin Creed and Kofi) (c) (with Prince Nana) by 2–1	Two out of three falls match for the AEW World Trios Championship	24:10
11	Jon Moxley (c) defeated Mark Davis by technical submission	Singles match for the AEW Continental Championship	23:30
12	Will Ospreay (c) (3) defeated Darby Allin (2), Samoa Joe (2), Adam Copeland (2), Kazuchika Okada (1), Ricochet (1), "Speedball" Mike Bailey (0), and Konosuke Takeshita (0)	Clockwork Carnage match for the AEW World Championship	32:15
(c) / – the champion(s) heading into the match; P / – the match was broadcast on the pre-show

=== Clockwork Carnage match statistics ===
- Entry Order: Will Ospreay, Konosuke Takeshita, "Speedball" Mike Bailey, Ricochet, Darby Allin, Kazuchika Okada, Adam Copeland, and Samoa Joe

Clockwork Carnage match statistics
Score								Point winner	Fall loser	Decision	Notes	Time
Copeland	Allin	Okada	Takeshita	Bailey	Ricochet	Joe	Ospreay	Point winner	Fall loser	Decision	Notes	Time
Eliminated								Konosuke Takeshita	"Speedball" Mike Bailey	Pinfall	Pinned after the Raging Fire	13:50
Eliminated								Kazuchika Okada	Konosuke Takeshita	Pinfall	Pinned after the Rainmaker	15:55
0	0	0	—	—	0	1	0	Samoa Joe	Darby Allin	Pinfall	Pinned after the Muscle Buster	17:45
0	0	0	—	—	1	1	0	Ricochet	Darby Allin	Pinfall	Pinned immediately following the Muscle Buster by Samoa Joe	18:00
0	0	1	—	—	1	1	0	Kazuchika Okada	Adam Copeland	Pinfall	Pinned after the Rainmaker	18:25
0	0	1	—	—	1	1	1	Will Ospreay	Ricochet	Pinfall	Pinned after the Styles Clash	20:00
0	1	1	—	—	1	1	1	Darby Allin	Will Ospreay	Pinfall	Pinned after the Coffin Drop	20:05
0	2	1	—	—	1	1	1	Darby Allin	Adam Copeland	Pinfall	Pinned with a la magistral	20:45
0	2	1	—	—	1	1	2	Will Ospreay	Darby Allin	Pinfall	Pinned after the Hidden Blade	21:10
0	2	1	—	—	1	2	2	Samoa Joe	Will Ospreay	Submission	Submitted to the Coquina Clutch	28:40
1	2	1	—	—	1	2	2	Adam Copeland	Samoa Joe	Pinfall	Pinned after a spear	30:05
2	2	1	—	—	1	2	2	Adam Copeland	Ricochet	Pinfall	Pinned after a spear	30:10
2	2	1	—	—	1	2	3	Will Ospreay	Adam Copeland	Pinfall	Pinned after the Hidden Blade	32:10
Winner								Will Ospreay	—N/a			32:15
