= All Out (2023) =

All Elite Wrestling pay-per-view event

- Promotional poster
- Promotion: All Elite Wrestling
- Date: September 3, 2023
- City: Chicago, Illinois
- Venue: United Center
- Attendance: 9,826
- Buy rate: 100,000

Pay-per-view chronology
← Previous; All In: London	Next → WrestleDream

All Out chronology
← Previous; 2022	Next → 2024

The 2023 All Out was a professional wrestling pay-per-view (PPV) event produced by All Elite Wrestling (AEW). It was the fifth annual All Out and took place during Labor Day weekend on September 3, 2023, at the United Center in Chicago, Illinois, breaking its tradition of All Out taking place at the Now Arena, located in the Chicago metro area—not including the 2020 event due to the COVID-19 pandemic that year.

Thirteen matches were contested at the event, including three on the Zero Hour pre-show. In the main event, Jon Moxley defeated Orange Cassidy to win the AEW International Championship. In other prominent matches, Konosuke Takeshita defeated Kenny Omega, Luchasaurus defeated Darby Allin to retain the AEW TNT Championship, and Bryan Danielson defeated Ricky Starks in a No Disqualification Strap match. All Out was also notable for an appearance by C.J. Perry (formerly known as Lana in WWE) in what was her first professional wrestling appearance since 2021. This was also the first All Out in which the AEW World Championship was not defended, although the reigning champion, MJF, did perform on the event.

== Production ==
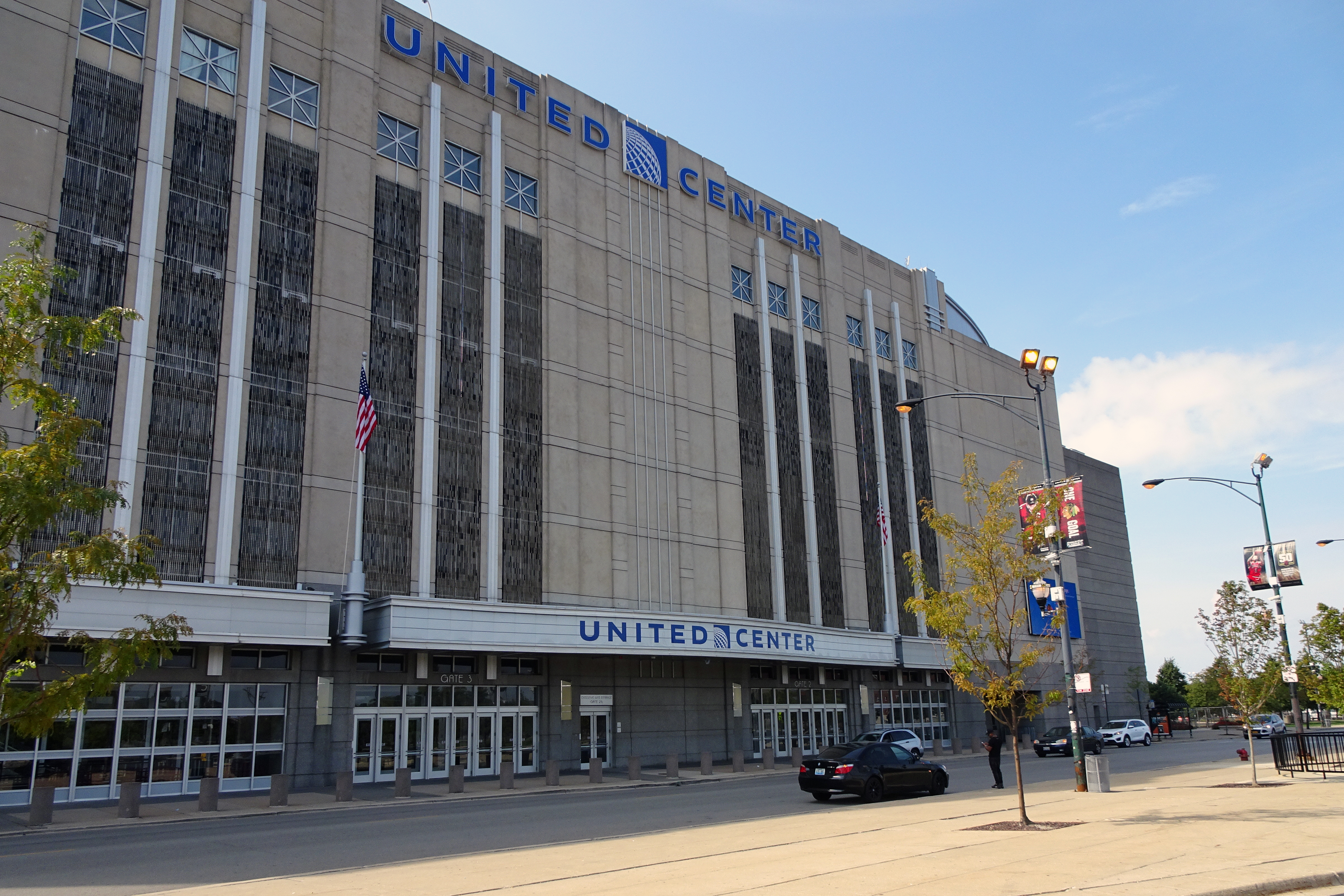
The 2023 All Out took place at the United Center in Chicago, Illinois.

=== Background ===
All Out is a professional wrestling pay-per-view (PPV) event held annually during Labor Day weekend by All Elite Wrestling (AEW) since 2019. It is one of AEW's "Big Four" PPVs, which also includes Double or Nothing, Full Gear, and Revolution, their four biggest domestic shows produced quarterly. During the Forbidden Door PPV on June 25, 2023, AEW announced that the fifth All Out event would take place on September 3 at the United Center in Chicago, Illinois, breaking its previous tradition of being held at the Now Arena, located in the Chicago suburb of Hoffman Estates, Illinois—not including the 2020 event due to the COVID-19 pandemic that year. Additionally as part of All Out week, it was revealed that AEW's weekly television programs, Wednesday Night Dynamite and Friday Night Rampage, would be held at the Now Arena on August 30, with Dynamite airing live that night and Rampage airing on tape delay on September 1, and then Saturday Collision airing live from the United Center on September 2 the night before All Out—Collision is AEW's third weekly program that launched in June. Tickets for all the events went on sale on July 14.

=== Storylines ===
All Out featured thirteen professional wrestling matches, including three on the pre-show, that involved different wrestlers from pre-existing feuds and storylines. Storylines were produced on AEW's weekly television programs, Dynamite, Collision, and Rampage.

On July 21 at Rampage: Royal Rampage, Darby Allin won the Royal Rampage Battle Royal to earn an AEW TNT Championship match against Luchasaurus at All Out.

On the August 12 episode of Collision, Powerhouse Hobbs said the next chapter of his book would be labeled "redemption". He then called out "The Redeemer", Miro, who came out but was attacked by Nick Comoroto and Aaron Solo. Miro cleared Comoroto and Solo from the ring, but then Hobbs put him down with a spinebuster and dropped his book on Miro's chest. The following week at Collision: Fight for the Fallen, after Hobbs' match, Miro appeared on the big screen and taunted Hobbs over his book. Later, a match between Miro and Hobbs was announced for All Out. During the All In Zero Hour pre-show, they signed the contract for the match, which ended in a brawl.

During Dynamite: Fyter Fest on August 23, Ruby Soho warned Kris Statlander that she would be going after her and the AEW TBS Championship. During that same week's Rampage: Fyter Fest, Statlander attacked Soho. The following night on Collision: Fyter Fest, Soho officially challenged Statlander for the TBS Championship at All Out, which Statlander accepted.

At All In, Konosuke Takeshita pinned Kenny Omega in a six-man tag team match to give his team the victory. During the All In media scrum, after Don Callis requested the bout, AEW president Tony Khan announced that Omega would face Takeshita at All Out.

For weeks, Orange Cassidy had been involved in feuds with the Blackpool Combat Club (Jon Moxley, Claudio Castagnoli, and Wheeler Yuta). On August 16 during Dynamite: Fight for the Fallen, he retained the AEW International Championship against Yuta. At All In just over a week later, he scored the win for his team in the Stadium Stampede match by pinning Castagnoli. During the All In post-event media scrum, Cassidy said that with pins over both Yuta and Castagnoli, he now wanted to pin Moxley next. It was then announced that if Cassidy retained the International Championship on the August 30 episode of Dynamite, he would get his chance to face Moxley in a title defense at All Out. Cassidy retained, thus officially scheduling the match.

On the August 5 episode of Collision, Ricky Starks challenged CM Punk for the "Real World Championship", with Ricky "The Dragon" Steamboat serving as the special outside enforcer due to Stark cheating his way to defeat Punk in their prior two matches, including the finals of the Owen Hart Cup. After the match, Starks assaulted Steamboat with the latter's own belt. As a result of his actions against Steamboat, AEW (kayfabe) suspended Starks for 28 days. However, Starks acquired a manager's license in order to continue appearing in AEW. On August 30, Tony Khan announced that on the September 2 episode, Starks would issue a challenge to Steamboat for a strap match at All Out. There, Starks signed a match contract for the bout against Steamboat. However, as the contract just said "The Dragon", "The American Dragon" Bryan Danielson then made his return from injury and signed the contract instead of Steamboat, thus scheduling Starks to face Danielson in the strap match at All Out.

== Event ==
Other on-screen personnel
Role	Name
Commentators	Excalibur (Pre-show and PPV)
Commentators	Kevin Kelly (Pre-show and first 5 matches)
Commentators	Nigel McGuinness (Pre-show and PPV)
Commentators	Jim Ross (PPV)
Commentators	Ricky Steamboat (Strap match)
Commentators	Taz (last 4 matches)
Ring announcers	Justin Roberts
Ring announcers	Dasha Gonzalez
Ring announcers	Bobby Cruise
Referees	Aubrey Edwards
Referees	Bryce Remsburg
Referees	Paul Turner
Referees	Rick Knox
Referees	Stephon Smith
Interviewer	Lexy Nair
Pre-show hosts	Renee Paquette
Pre-show hosts	RJ City

=== Pre-show ===
There were three matches contested on the pre-show. In the opening contest, an Over Budget Battle Royal was held. The final four men were Trent Beretta, Toa Liona, Brian Cage, and "Hangman" Adam Page. After eliminating Kyle Fletcher, Cage pushed Beretta over the top rope, thus eliminating him. Page then delivered a Buckshot Lariat to Liona and threw him over the top rope. Page then delivered Deadeye to Cage and threw him over the top rope, thus winning the battle royal.

In the next match, Diamanté, Athena, and Mercedes Martinez fought Hikaru Shida, Willow Nightingale and Skye Blue. In the closing stages, Shida delivered a falcon Arrow to Diamanté, Martinez delivered a spider German suplex to Blue and Athena delivered the O-Face to Willow, bur Willow then delivered the Pounce to Athena, allowing Blue to deliver Code Blue to Diamanté for the win.

In the pre-show main event, The Acclaimed (Max Caster and Anthony Bowens) and Billy Gunn (with Dennis Rodman) defended the AEW World Trios Championship against Jay Lethal, Jeff Jarrett, and Satnam Singh (with Karen Jarrett and Sonjay Dutt). In the closing stages, The Acclaimed and Gunn delivered Scissor Me Timbers to Jarrett for a two-count. Singh ten delivered a chokeslam to Bowens for a two-count. As Karen was attempting to hit Gunn with a guitar, referee Aubrey Edwards stopped her, allowing Gunn to deliver a low blow to Singh and Rodman to hit Singh with the guitar. Gunn then delivered a Fameasser to Lethal, allowing The Acclaimed to deliver The Arrival/Mic Drop combination on Lethal to retain the titles.

=== Preliminary matches ===
In the opening contest, Better Than You Bay Bay (MJF and Adam Cole) defended the ROH Tag Team Championship against the Dark Order (Alex Reynolds and John Silver) (with Evil Uno). In the closing stages, Dark Order delivered the Rolling Elbow/Enzeguiri/Stunner/German Suplex combination on Cole for a two-count. Unbeknownst to the referee, Reynolds hit MJF with a steel chair to the neck. Silver then delivered a fisherman buster to Cole for a two-count. MJF then delivered a Kangaroo Kick to the Dark Order, allowing Cole and MJF to deliver the Double Clothesline to Reynolds for the win.

Next, Samoa Joe defended for ROH World Television Championship against Shane Taylor. Before the match began, as Joe was making his entrance, MJF came out and attacked Joe. In the closing stages, Taylor delivered a splash to Joe for a two-count. Joe then delivered a Manhattan Drop and a senton for a two-count. Taylor then delivered a hanging stunner and a middle-rope splash for a near-fall. Joe then delivered a uranage and a rolling elbow and then locked in the Coquina Clutch, forcing Taylor to tap out.

In the next match, Luchasaurus (with Christian Cage) defended the AEW TNT Championship against Darby Allin (with Nick Wayne). In the opening stages, Luchasaurus delivered a head stomp to on the steel steps. Allin then delivered a senton atomico on the outside and a diving crossbody to Luchasaurus for a two-count. As Luchasaurus was attempting a torture rack submission, Allin countered it into a crucifix driver for a nearfall. Allin then delivered an avalanche sunset flip powerbomb for another nearfall. Luchasaurus then delivered a German Suplex and then locked in a torture rack submission, but Allin escaped. Christian then attacked Wayne on the outside and was attempting a con-chair-to, forcing Allin to stop the attempt. Luchasaurus then delivered two tombstone piledrivers and a Northern lariat to retain his title.

Next, Miro faced Powerhouse Hobbs. In the opening stages, Miro delivered a spinning leg lariat. Hobbs then delivered a belly-to-back suplex and a clothesline for a two-count. Miro then delivered a superplex to Hobbs. As Hobbs delivered a lariat, Miro immediately delivered a clothesline and an apron cannonball senton. As Miro was attempting a suplex, Hobbs countered it into a gourdbuster. As Miro was attempting the Machka Kick, Hobbs countered it into a powerslam for a nearfall. Miro then delivered the Machka Kick and then locked in Game Over, but Hobbs escaped and delivered the Last Testament Spinebuster for another nearfall. As Hobbs was attempting the Camel Clutch, Miro escaped and delivered a spinebuster and locked in Game Over, forcing Hobbs to tap out. After the match, Hobbs attacked Miro. Miro's wife CJ Perry then made her AEW debut and attacked Hobbs with a chair. Miro used the distraction to drive Hobbs off, but then seemed uneasy at the presence of his wife and left the ring.

In the next match, Kris Statlander defended the AEW TBS Championship against Ruby Soho (with Saraya). In the opening stages, Soho delivered a shotgun dropkick and a running knee for a two-count. Statlander then delivered an Eat Defeat for a two-count. Statlander then delivered a running corner knee strike and a powerslam for a two-count. As Statlander was attempting the Sunday Night Fever, Soho countered it into a roll-up for a two-count. Statlander then delivered a Michinoku Driver and an avalanche powerslam for a nearfall. Soho then delivered a poison Rana, a tornado DDT and a hurricarana driver for a nearfall. As Statlander was going to the top rope, Saraya distracted her, allowing Soho to deliver an avalanche No Future and the Destination Unknown for another nearfall. As Soho was attempting to the spray Statlander with a spray paint, Toni Storm stopped her, allowing Statlander to deliver the Sunday Night Fever to retain her title.

The next bout was a No Disqualification Strap match contested between Bryan Danielson and Ricky Starks. Before the match started, Starks attacked Danielson. Danielson then delivered a headbutt, but Starks whipped Danielson in the eye with the strap. Danielson then delivered running dropkicks to Starks in the corner. Danielson then started whipping Starks with the strap and delivered the Yes! Kicks. As Danielson was attempting a running corner dropkick, Starks countered it into a lariat. Starks then started trash-talking Ricky "The Dragon" Steamboat, allowing Danielson to push Starks into the ring-post. Danielson then started delivering roundhouse kicks to Starks. Big Bill then came out to attack Danielson, but Steamboat stopped him and started delivering chops to Bill, but Bill then started choking Steamboat. Danielson then delivered a diving crossbody to Bill on the outside. As Danielson was attempting the Busaiku Knee inside the ring to Starks, Starks intercepted it with a spear for a two-count. As Starks was attempting the Roshambo, Danielson escaped it and delivered the Busaiku Knee for another two-count. Danielson then delivered a roundhouse kick and then locked in the LeBell Lock with the strap around Starks's neck, forcing Starks to pass out, and this Danielson won the match.

In the next match, Blackpool Combat Club (Wheeler Yuta and Claudio Castagnoli) faced Eddie Kingston and Katsuyori Shibata. In the closing stages, Kingston delivered a butterfly suplex and an STO leg sweep to Yuta. As Shibata was attempting a powerbomb, Claudio countered it into a powerbomb. Yuta then delivered a German suplex to Kingston for a nearfall. Claudio then delivered the Neutralizer to Kingston for another nearfall. Kingston then delivered a spinning backfist and a Northern Lights Bomb to Claudio, but Yuta broke up the pinfall attempt. Claudio then delivered an uppercut to Kingston and pinned him for the win.

Next, Kenny Omega faced Konosuke Takeshita. In the opening stages, Takeshita delivered a leg lariat and a backdrop driver to Omega for a two-count. Unbeknownst to the referee, Don Callis put a stack of chairs onto Omega, allowing Takeshita to deliver a tope con giro into the chairs. Takeshita then delivered a big boot and a blue Thunder Bomb for a two-count. As Takeshita was attempting a swanton bomb, Omega got the knees up and delivered a snap dragon suplex, a V-Trigger and a poison Rana for another nearfall. Omega then delivered another V-Trigger, but Takeshita then immediately delivered a lariat. Omega then delivered a powerbomb and a V-Trigger for a two-count. As Omega was attempting the One Winged Angel, Takeshita reversed it into a wheelbarrow tombstone piledriver and a German suplex for a two-count. Omega then delivered another V-Trigger, but as he was attempting an avalanche One Winged Angel, Takeshita escaped and delivered an avalanche Blue Thunder Driver and a jumping knee strike, but Omega kicked out. As Takeshita was attempting to hit Omega with a screwdriver, Omega blocked it and delivered a ripcord V-Trigger. As Takeshita was again attempting to use the screwdriver, referee Paul Turner stopped him. Takeshita then delivered a wheelbarrow German suplex, a jumping knee strike and a kneeling knee strike and then pinned Omega for the win.

In the penultimate match, Bullet Club Gold (Jay White, Juice Robinson, Colten Gunn, and Austin Gunn) faced FTR (Cash Wheeler and Dax Harwood) and The Young Bucks (Nick Jackson and Matt Jackson). In the closing stages, Matt delivered a superkick to Robinson, while Wheeler delivered a hurricarana to Austin. Matt and Harwood then delivered an assisted piledriver to Austin for a two-count. Nick and Wheeler then delivered the Shatter Machine to White and Matt and Harwood delivered the BTE Trigger to White, but Colten broke up the pinfall attempt. White then delivered the Blade Runner to Wheeler, allowing Austin to pin him to win the match.

=== Main event ===
In the main event, Orange Cassidy defended the AEW International Championship against Jon Moxley. In the opening stages, Cassidy delivered a Stundog Millionaire and a suicide dive to Moxley on the outside. Moxley then delivered an X Plex and back suplexes to Cassidy. Moxley then delivered a piledriver for a two-count. Casaidy then delivered two tornado DDTs, but Moxley immediately delivered a Gotch style piledriver for a nearfall. Moxley then locked in a rear naked choke, but Cassidy escaped. Moxley then removed the pasding of the floor on the outside. As Moxley was attempting a piledriver on the concrete floor, Cassidy countered it into Beach Break and then delivered a shotgun dropkick to Moxley into the steel steps. Cassidy then delivered two Orange Punches to Moxley for a nearfall. As Cassidy was attempting another Orange Punch, Moxley intercepted it into an Ace Crusher for a two-count. Cassidy then delivered another Orange Punch and a spear for another nearfall. Moxley then delivered three lariats and the Paradigm Shift for a two-count. Moxley then delivered the Death Rider and then pinned Cassidy to win the International title. After the match, all members of the Blackpool Combat Club celebrated with Moxley. With this win, Moxley became the first person to hold both the AEW World Championship and the AEW International Championship.

== Reception ==
Thomas Hall of 411Mania gave the event at 8.5 out of 10 praising its storytelling. Wrestling journalist Dave Meltzer of the Wrestling Observer Newsletter rated the Charity Battle Royal and the TBS Championship match 2.5 stars, the six-woman tag team match and the AEW World Trios Championship bout 2 stars (the lowest rated matches on the card), the ROH World Tag Title match and the TNT Championship match 3.75 stars, the ROH World Television title match 2.75 stars, the Miro-Hobbs bout and the BCC-Shibata and Kingston match 4.25 stars, the Strap match and the Omega-Takeshita bout 5 stars (the highest rated matches on the card); and the eight-man tag team match and the main event 4.5 stars.

== Results ==
No.	Results	Stipulations	Times
1^{P}	"Hangman" Adam Page won by last eliminating Brian Cage (Note: Order of elimination: Tony Nese, Serpentico, Shawn Spears, Komander, Angelo Parker, Dalton Castle, Darius Martin, Chuck Taylor, Bishop Kaun, Matt Menard, Jake Hager, Mark Davis, Daniel Garcia, Scorpio Sky, Action Andretti, Kyle Fletcher, Trent Beretta, Toa Liona, and Brian Cage.)	Over Budget Charity Battle Royale	13:15
2^{P}	Hikaru Shida, Willow Nightingale, and Skye Blue defeated Diamanté, Athena, and Mercedes Martinez (with Billie Starkz) by pinfall	Trios match	8:30
3^{P}	Billy Gunn and The Acclaimed (Max Caster and Anthony Bowens) (c) (with Dennis Rodman) defeated Jay Lethal, Jeff Jarrett, and Satnam Singh (with Sonjay Dutt and Karen Jarrett) by pinfall	Trios match for the AEW World Trios Championship	6:00
4	Better Than You Bay Bay (Adam Cole and MJF) (c) defeated The Dark Order (Alex Reynolds and John Silver) (with Evil Uno) by pinfall	Tag team match for the ROH World Tag Team Championship	14:05
5	Samoa Joe (c) defeated Shane Taylor by submission	Singles match for the ROH World Television Championship	6:25
6	Luchasaurus (c) (with Christian Cage) defeated Darby Allin (with Nick Wayne) by pinfall	Singles match for the AEW TNT Championship	12:20
7	Miro defeated Powerhouse Hobbs by submission	Singles match	15:40
8	Kris Statlander (c) defeated Ruby Soho (with Saraya) by pinfall	Singles match for the AEW TBS Championship	12:25
9	Bryan Danielson defeated Ricky Starks by technical submission	No Disqualification Strap match	16:40
10	Blackpool Combat Club (Wheeler Yuta and Claudio Castagnoli) defeated Eddie Kingston and Katsuyori Shibata by pinfall	Tag team match	15:55
11	Konosuke Takeshita (with Don Callis) defeated Kenny Omega by pinfall	Singles match	22:30
12	Bullet Club Gold (Jay White, Juice Robinson, Colten Gunn, and Austin Gunn) defeated FTR (Cash Wheeler and Dax Harwood) and The Young Bucks (Matt Jackson and Nick Jackson) by pinfall	Eight-man tag team match	21:35
13	Jon Moxley defeated Orange Cassidy (c) by pinfall	Singles match for the AEW International Championship	19:50
(c) / – the champion(s) heading into the match; P / – the match was broadcast on the pre-show

=== ROH World Television Championship Eliminator Tournament bracket ===
Quarterfinals; ROH Honor Club TV; July 27
Shane Taylor	Pin
Serpentico	4:22
Christopher Daniels	Pin
JD Drake	6:09
Tony Nese	Pin
Cheeseburger	6:50
Gravity	Pin
Anthony Henry	6:47

Semifinals; ROH Honor Club TV; August 3
Shane Taylor	Pin
Christopher Daniels	6:39
Tony Nese	5:35
Gravity	Pin

Final; ROH Honor Club TV; August 10
Shane Taylor	Pin
Gravity	5:28
