= AEW WrestleDream =

All Elite Wrestling pay-per-view event series

- AEW WrestleDream logo
- Promotions: All Elite Wrestling
- First event: 2023
- Event gimmick: Memorial show for New Japan Pro-Wrestling founder Antonio Inoki

AEW WrestleDream is a professional wrestling pay-per-view (PPV) event produced by the American promotion All Elite Wrestling (AEW). Established in 2023, it is held annually in October as a memorial show to New Japan Pro-Wrestling (NJPW) founder Antonio Inoki; AEW and NJPW have had a working partnership since early 2021. The name of the event is a reference to Inoki, who AEW President and Chief Executive Officer Tony Khan called "wrestling's greatest dreamer".

== History ==
On October 1, 2022 (September 30 in Eastern Time), Antonio Inoki, the founder of the Japanese professional wrestling promotion New Japan Pro-Wrestling (NJPW), died. Prior to his death, the American promotion All Elite Wrestling (AEW) began a working partnership with NJPW in early 2021. This resulted in the annual co-promoted event, AEW x NJPW: Forbidden Door, which was first held in June 2022.

In April 2023, AEW filed to trademark "AEW WrestleDream". During the All In media scrum on August 27, AEW president Tony Khan officially announced that AEW would hold a pay-per-view (PPV) event titled WrestleDream, which would be held in honor of Inoki, who was someone Khan looked up to in the professional wrestling industry. The event was scheduled to take place on October 1, 2023—the one-year anniversary of Inoki's death—at Climate Pledge Arena in Seattle, Washington, marking AEW's first PPV to be held in the U.S. state of Washington. The name of the event refers to Inoki, who Khan called "wrestling's greatest dreamer". Despite not being a co-promoted event with NJPW, the event saw the participation of NJPW wrestlers Satoshi Kojima, TMDK (Bad Dude Tito, Mikey Nicholls, and Shane Haste), Katsuyori Shibata, Zack Sabre Jr., and Will Ospreay, who would later sign with AEW, as well as Inoki's former student Josh Barnett.

On April 11, 2024, a second WrestleDream was confirmed to be held on October 12, 2024, in Tacoma, Washington, thus establishing WrestleDream as an annual October event for AEW. The third WrestleDream, which took place on October 18, 2025, was the first to take place outside of Washington, as it was held at the Chaifetz Arena in St. Louis, Missouri.

== Events ==
#	Event	Date	City	Venue	Main event	Ref.
1	WrestleDream (2023)	October 1, 2023	Seattle, Washington	Climate Pledge Arena	Christian Cage (c) vs. Darby Allin in a two out of three falls match for the AEW TNT Championship	
2	WrestleDream (2024)	October 12, 2024	Tacoma, Washington	Tacoma Dome	Bryan Danielson (c) vs. Jon Moxley for the AEW World Championship	
3	WrestleDream (2025)	October 18, 2025	St. Louis, Missouri	Chaifetz Arena	Darby Allin vs. Jon Moxley in an "I Quit" match	
4	WrestleDream (2026)	October 17, 2026	Orlando, Florida	Addition Financial Arena	Will Ospreay (c) vs. Samoa Joe vs. "Speedball" Mike Bailey vs. Adam Copeland vs. Konosuke Takeshita vs. Kazuchika Okada vs. Ricochet vs. Darby Allin in a Clockwork Carnage match for the AEW World Championship	
(c) – refers to the champion(s) heading into the match

== See also ==
- List of All Elite Wrestling pay-per-view events
