= List of All Elite Wrestling pay-per-view events =

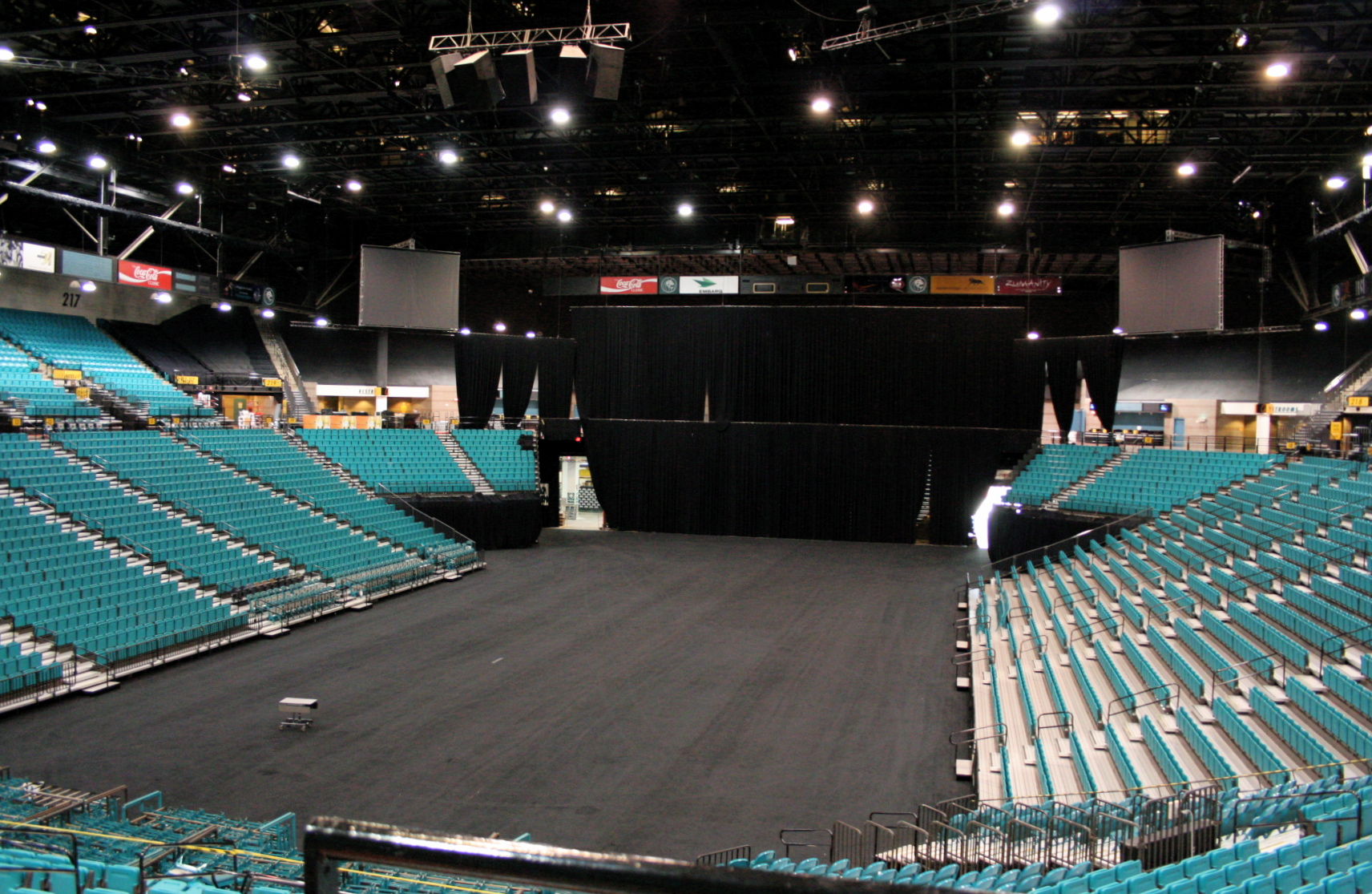
The MGM Grand Garden Arena hosted All Elite Wrestling's inaugural pay-per-view event Double or Nothing

This is a list of All Elite Wrestling pay-per-view events, detailing all wrestling shows promoted on pay-per-view (PPV) by All Elite Wrestling (AEW).

The formation of AEW was announced on January 1, 2019, with the promotion holding its inaugural event, Double or Nothing, which doubled as its inaugural PPV event, on May 25. All In is regarded as AEW's marquee event; furthermore, AEW President and Chief Executive Officer Tony Khan referred to Double or Nothing, All Out, Full Gear, and Revolution as being the promotion's "big four" PPVs later made "big five" with the addition of All In, their five biggest shows of the year, produced roughly quarterly. From March 2020 to July 2021, the majority of AEW's events were held at Daily's Place in Jacksonville, Florida due to the COVID-19 pandemic. AEW began readmitting a limited number of fans in August 2020 and then ran full capacity shows in May 2021 before the promotion returned to live touring in mid-July. In June 2022, AEW added the Forbidden Door PPV event to its yearly lineup, a co-promoted event with New Japan Pro-Wrestling (NJPW), and then further expanded its PPV event schedule in the second half of 2023, adding All In, WrestleDream, and Worlds End in August, October, and December, respectively. Another PPV, Dynasty, was added to the lineup in April 2024, totaling nine PPV events for the year.

AEW PPVs are primarily available in the United States through their television partner HBO Max, who offer the events at a slightly discounted price; other carriers include Amazon Prime Video in the United States, Canada, France, Germany, and the United Kingdom; MyAEW, PPV.com and YouTube in select international markets; and with select traditional PPV outlets, satellite providers, and sports bars in North America. Each event is preceded by a free pre-show consisting of preliminary matches; from 2019 to 2022, each pre-show held the subtitle "The Buy-In", keeping in line with the promotion's use of casino imagery. After AEW president Tony Khan acquired Ring of Honor (ROH) in 2022, AEW adopted ROH's use of "Zero Hour" as a subtitle for their pre-shows. (Note: Keeping in line with the show's casino theme, Double or Nothing pre-shows are still titled "The Buy In".) After HBO Max started carrying AEW PPVs in 2025, Zero Hour was retooled into a "barker" preview show, with preliminary matches instead airing on television under the Saturday Tailgate Brawl banner.

== Past events ==
=== 2019 ===
Event	Date	Location	Venue	Attendance	Main event	Notes
Double or Nothing	May 25	Paradise, Nevada	MGM Grand Garden Arena	11,000	Chris Jericho vs. Kenny Omega to determine who would challenge for the inaugural AEW World Championship at All Out	
Fyter Fest	June 29	Daytona Beach, Florida	Ocean Center	4,200	Jon Moxley vs. Joey Janela in an Unsanctioned match	
Fight for the Fallen	July 13	Jacksonville, Florida	Daily's Place	4,900	The Young Bucks (Matt Jackson and Nick Jackson) vs. The Brotherhood (Cody and Dustin Rhodes)	
All Out	August 31	Hoffman Estates, Illinois	Sears Centre Arena	10,500	Chris Jericho vs. Adam Page for the inaugural AEW World Championship	
Full Gear	November 9	Baltimore, Maryland	Royal Farms Arena	8,500	Jon Moxley vs. Kenny Omega in an Unsanctioned Lights Out match	
(c) – refers to the champion(s) heading into the match

Notes

- Fyter Fest and Fight for the Fallen only aired on pay-per-view internationally; in the United States, both events aired for free on the B/R Live streaming service. The events since have been held as special episodes of Dynamite, and later, Rampage and Collision.

=== 2020 ===
Event	Date	Location	Venue	Attendance	Main event	Notes
Revolution	February 29	Chicago, Illinois	Wintrust Arena	7,000	Chris Jericho (c) vs. Jon Moxley for the AEW World Championship	
Double or Nothing	May 23	Jacksonville, Florida	Daily's Place; TIAA Bank Field (Note: Most of the event was contested at Daily's Place, but the main event match was taped at the adjacent TIAA Bank Field.)	0	The Elite ("Hangman" Adam Page, Kenny Omega, Matt Jackson, and Nick Jackson) and Matt Hardy vs. The Inner Circle (Chris Jericho, Jake Hager, Sammy Guevara, Santana, and Ortiz) in a Stadium Stampede match	
All Out	September 5	Jacksonville, Florida; Winter Park, Florida	Daily's Place; Woodland Lakes Dental (Note: The Tooth and Nail match between Big Swole and Dr. Britt Baker, D.M.D. was pre-taped prior to the event at Baker's real-life dental clinic in Winter Park, Florida.)	750	Jon Moxley (c) vs. MJF for the AEW World Championship	
Full Gear	November 7	Jacksonville, Florida; Cameron, North Carolina	Daily's Place; Hardy Compound (Note: The Elite Deletion Match between Matt Hardy and Sammy Guevara was taped a week prior to the event at Hardy's home, The Hardy Compound, located in Cameron, North Carolina.)	1,000	Jon Moxley (c) vs. Eddie Kingston in an "I Quit" match for the AEW World Championship	
(c) – refers to the champion(s) heading into the match

=== 2021 ===
Event	Date	Location	Venue	Attendance	Main event	Notes
Revolution	March 7	Jacksonville, Florida; Atlanta, Georgia (Note: The tag team Street Fight pitting Darby Allin and Sting against Team Taz (Brian Cage and Ricky Starks) was pre-taped at a warehouse in Atlanta, Georgia; the exact location and tape date are unknown.)	Daily's Place; Warehouse in Atlanta, Georgia	1,300	Kenny Omega (c) vs. Jon Moxley in an Exploding Barbed Wire Deathmatch for the AEW World Championship	
Double or Nothing	May 30	Jacksonville, Florida	Daily's Place; TIAA Bank Field	5,200	The Inner Circle (Chris Jericho, Jake Hager, Sammy Guevara, Santana, and Ortiz) vs. The Pinnacle (MJF, Shawn Spears, Wardlow, Cash Wheeler, and Dax Harwood) in a Stadium Stampede match If The Inner Circle lost, they would be forced to disband	
All Out	September 5	Hoffman Estates, Illinois	Now Arena	10,126	Kenny Omega (c) vs. Christian Cage for the AEW World Championship	
Full Gear	November 13	Minneapolis, Minnesota	Target Center	10,442	Kenny Omega (c) vs. "Hangman" Adam Page for the AEW World Championship	
(c) – refers to the champion(s) heading into the match

=== 2022 ===
Event	Date	Location	Venue	Attendance	Main event	Notes
Revolution	March 6	Orlando, Florida (Note: Addition Financial Arena is on the main campus of the University of Central Florida, which has an Orlando mailing address but is physically located in unincorporated Orange County. All AEW events at this venue have been billed as taking place in Orlando.)	Addition Financial Arena	8,700	"Hangman" Adam Page (c) vs. Adam Cole for the AEW World Championship	
Double or Nothing	May 29	Paradise, Nevada	T-Mobile Arena	14,459	"Hangman" Adam Page (c) vs. CM Punk for the AEW World Championship	
Forbidden Door	June 26	Chicago, Illinois	United Center	16,529	Jon Moxley vs. Hiroshi Tanahashi for the interim AEW World Championship	Co-produced with New Japan Pro-Wrestling
All Out	September 4	Hoffman Estates, Illinois	Now Arena	10,014	Jon Moxley (c) vs. CM Punk for the AEW World Championship	
Full Gear	November 19	Newark, New Jersey	Prudential Center	12,106	Jon Moxley (c) vs. MJF for the AEW World Championship	
(c) – refers to the champion(s) heading into the match

=== 2023 ===
Event	Date	Location	Venue	Attendance	Main event	Notes
Revolution	March 5	San Francisco, California	Chase Center	9,000	MJF (c) vs. Bryan Danielson in a 60-minute Iron Man match for the AEW World Championship	
Double or Nothing	May 28	Paradise, Nevada	T-Mobile Arena	10,550	Blackpool Combat Club (Jon Moxley, Bryan Danielson, Wheeler Yuta, and Claudio Castagnoli) vs. The Elite (Kenny Omega, Matt Jackson, Nick Jackson, and "Hangman" Adam Page) in an Anarchy in the Arena match	
Forbidden Door	June 25	Toronto, Ontario, Canada	Scotiabank Arena	14,826	Bryan Danielson vs. Kazuchika Okada	Co-produced with New Japan Pro-Wrestling First AEW pay-per-view to be held outside the United States
All In	August 27	London, England	Wembley Stadium	72,265	MJF (c) vs. Adam Cole for the AEW World Championship	First AEW pay-per-view to be held in Europe
All Out	September 3	Chicago, Illinois	United Center	9,826	Orange Cassidy (c) vs. Jon Moxley for the AEW International Championship	
WrestleDream	October 1	Seattle, Washington	Climate Pledge Arena	7,108	Christian Cage (c) vs. Darby Allin in a Two out of three falls match for the AEW TNT Championship	
Full Gear	November 18	Inglewood, California	Kia Forum	12,904	MJF (c) vs. Jay White for the AEW World Championship	
Worlds End	December 30	Uniondale, New York	Nassau Veterans Memorial Coliseum	10,093	MJF (c) vs. Samoa Joe for the AEW World Championship	
(c) – refers to the champion(s) heading into the match

=== 2024 ===
Event	Date	Location	Venue	Attendance	Main event	Notes
Revolution	March 3	Greensboro, North Carolina	Greensboro Coliseum	16,878	Sting and Darby Allin (c) vs. The Young Bucks (Matthew Jackson and Nicholas Jackson) in a Tornado tag team match for the AEW World Tag Team Championship; This was also Sting's retirement match.	
Dynasty	April 21	St. Louis, Missouri	Chaifetz Arena	6,619	Samoa Joe (c) vs. Swerve Strickland for the AEW World Championship	
Double or Nothing	May 26	Paradise, Nevada	MGM Grand Garden Arena	9,099	The Elite (Matthew Jackson, Nicholas Jackson, Kazuchika Okada, and Jack Perry) vs. Team AEW (Bryan Danielson, Darby Allin, Cash Wheeler, and Dax Harwood) in an Anarchy in the Arena match	
Forbidden Door	June 30	Elmont, New York	UBS Arena	11,000	Swerve Strickland (c) vs. Will Ospreay for the AEW World Championship	Co-produced with New Japan Pro-Wrestling
All In	August 25	London, England	Wembley Stadium	46,473	Swerve Strickland (c) vs. Bryan Danielson in a Title vs. Career match for the AEW World Championship	
All Out	September 7	Hoffman Estates, Illinois	Now Arena	8,660	"Hangman" Adam Page vs. Swerve Strickland in a Lights Out Steel Cage match	
WrestleDream	October 12	Tacoma, Washington	Tacoma Dome	8,045	Bryan Danielson (c) vs. Jon Moxley for the AEW World Championship	
Full Gear	November 23	Newark, New Jersey	Prudential Center	10,094	Jon Moxley (c) vs. Orange Cassidy for the AEW World Championship	
Worlds End	December 28	Orlando, Florida	Addition Financial Arena	7,005	Jon Moxley (c) vs. Orange Cassidy vs. "Hangman" Adam Page vs. Jay White for the AEW World Championship	
(c) – refers to the champion(s) heading into the match

=== 2025 ===
Event	Date	Location	Venue	Attendance	Main event	Notes
Wrestle Dynasty	January 5	Tokyo, Japan	Tokyo Dome	16,300	Zack Sabre Jr. (c) vs. Ricochet for the IWGP World Heavyweight Championship	Co-produced with New Japan Pro-Wrestling, Ring of Honor, Stardom, and Consejo Mundial de Lucha Libre First AEW pay-per-view to be held in Asia
Revolution	March 9	Los Angeles, California	Crypto.com Arena	11,670	Jon Moxley (c) vs. Cope vs. Christian Cage for the AEW World Championship	
Dynasty	April 6	Philadelphia, Pennsylvania	Liacouras Center	7,921	Jon Moxley (c) vs. Swerve Strickland for the AEW World Championship	
Double or Nothing	May 25	Glendale, Arizona	Desert Diamond Arena	8,179	"Hangman" Adam Page vs. Will Ospreay in the Men's Owen Hart Foundation Tournament Final for an AEW World Championship match at All In	
All In	July 12	Arlington, Texas	Globe Life Field	21,973	Jon Moxley (c) vs. "Hangman" Adam Page in a Texas Death match for the AEW World Championship	
Forbidden Door	August 24	London, England	The O_{2} Arena	18,992	Golden Lovers (Kenny Omega and Kota Ibushi), Darby Allin, Hiroshi Tanahashi, and Will Ospreay vs. Death Riders (Claudio Castagnoli and Jon Moxley), The Young Bucks (Matt Jackson and Nick Jackson), and Gabe Kidd in a Lights Out Steel Cage match	Co-produced with New Japan Pro-Wrestling
All Out	September 20	Toronto, Ontario, Canada	Scotiabank Arena	12,222	"Hangman" Adam Page (c) vs. Kyle Fletcher for the AEW World Championship	
WrestleDream	October 18	St. Louis, Missouri	Chaifetz Arena	6,293	Darby Allin vs. Jon Moxley in an "I Quit" match	
Full Gear	November 22	Newark, New Jersey	Prudential Center	10,485	"Hangman" Adam Page (c) vs. Samoa Joe in a Steel Cage match for the AEW World Championship	
Worlds End	December 27	Hoffman Estates, Illinois	Now Arena	8,968	Samoa Joe (c) vs. Swerve Strickland vs. "Hangman" Adam Page vs. MJF for the AEW World Championship	
(c) – refers to the champion(s) heading into the match

=== 2026 ===
Event	Date	Location	Venue	Attendance	Main event	Notes
Revolution	March 15	Los Angeles, California	Crypto.com Arena	12,590	MJF (c) vs. "Hangman" Adam Page in a Last Chance Texas Deathmatch for the AEW World Championship	
Dynasty	April 12	Vancouver, British Columbia, Canada	Rogers Arena	9,136	MJF (c) vs. Kenny Omega for the AEW World Championship	
Double or Nothing	May 24	New York City, New York	Louis Armstrong Stadium	14,394	Darby Allin (c) vs. MJF in a Title vs. Hair match for the AEW World Championship	
Forbidden Door	June 28	San Jose, California	SAP Center	9,082	Will Ospreay vs. Swerve Strickland in the Men's Owen Hart Foundation Tournament Final for an AEW World Championship match at All In	Co-produced with Consejo Mundial de Lucha Libre, New Japan Pro-Wrestling, and World Wonder Ring Stardom
Redemption	July 26	Montreal, Quebec, Canada	Bell Centre	7,107	Kenny Omega (c) vs. Kevin Knight for the AEW World Championship	
All In	August 30	London, England	Wembley Stadium	41,102	Kenny Omega (c) vs. Will Ospreay for the AEW World Championship	
All Out	September 26	Chicago, Illinois	Now Arena	9,456	Will Ospreay (c) vs. Jon Moxley for the AEW World Championship	
WrestleDream	October 17	Orlando, Florida	Addition Financial Arena	7,173	Will Ospreay (c) vs. Samoa Joe vs. "Speedball" Mike Bailey vs. Adam Copeland vs. Konosuke Takeshita vs. Kazuchika Okada vs. Ricochet vs. Darby Allin in a Clockwork Carnage match for the AEW World Championship	
Full Gear	November 14	Phoenix, Arizona	Mortgage Matchup Center		Will Ospreay (c) vs. Kyle Fletcher for the AEW World Championship	
(c) – refers to the champion(s) heading into the match

== Upcoming events ==
=== 2026 ===
Event	Date	Location	Venue	Main event	Notes
Worlds End	December 19	Minneapolis, Minnesota	Target Center	TBA	
(c) – refers to the champion(s) heading into the match

=== 2027 ===
Event	Date	Location	Venue	Main event	Notes
Dynasty	February 7	Liverpool, England	Liverpool Arena	TBA	

== Themed events ==
Some All Elite Wrestling events may be thematic, centered on particular types of matches, or have an annually recurring main event.

Event	Feature
Current
Double or Nothing	Since 2020, the event features a specialized tornado tag team match between two multi-man teams, originally the Stadium Stampede match but since 2022, the Anarchy in the Arena match. The event itself also carries a casino theme, which was originally a reference to the event taking place in the Las Vegas area.
Forbidden Door	Features direct competition between wrestlers from AEW and New Japan Pro-Wrestling (NJPW).
Worlds End	Features the finals of the Continental Classic tournament.
WrestleDream	The event is a memorial show held in tribute to NJPW founder Antonio Inoki.
Former
Wrestle Dynasty	Features direct competition between wrestlers from AEW, NJPW, Consejo Mundial de Lucha Libre, Ring of Honor, and World Wonder Ring Stardom.

== See also ==
- List of All Elite Wrestling special events
- List of AEW Dynamite special episodes
- List of major Lucha Libre AAA Worldwide events
- List of ECW supercards and ppv events
- List of major DDT events
- List of FMW supercards and ppv events
- List of GFW specials and ppv events
- List of MLW specials and ppv events
- List of NWA ppv events
- List of NJPW ppv events
- List of ROH ppv events
- List of SMW supercard events
- List of TNA / Impact Wrestling ppv events
- List of WCCW supercard events
- List of WCW closed-circuit events and ppv events
- List of WCW Clash of the Champions shows
- List of WWE pay-per-view and livestreaming supercards
- List of WWE Saturday Night Main Event shows
- List of WWE Tribute to the Troops shows
