= WrestleDream (2023) =

All Elite Wrestling pay-per-view event

- Promotional poster featuring Antonio Inoki (top) amongst various AEW talents
- Promotion: All Elite Wrestling
- Date: October 1, 2023
- City: Seattle, Washington
- Venue: Climate Pledge Arena
- Attendance: 7,108
- Buy rate: 110,000

Pay-per-view chronology
← Previous; All Out	Next → Full Gear

WrestleDream chronology
← Previous; First	Next → 2024

The 2023 WrestleDream was a professional wrestling pay-per-view (PPV) event produced by the American promotion All Elite Wrestling (AEW). It was the inaugural WrestleDream and took place on October 1, 2023, at the Climate Pledge Arena in Seattle, Washington, marking AEW's first PPV to be held in the state of Washington. The event was a tribute show in honor of New Japan Pro-Wrestling (NJPW) founder Antonio Inoki; it took place on the one-year anniversary of his death.

Fourteen matches were contested at the event, including four on the "Zero Hour" pre-show. In the main event, Christian Cage defeated Darby Allin by 2–1 in a two out of three falls match to retain the AEW TNT Championship. In other prominent matches, Bryan Danielson defeated Zack Sabre Jr. and Swerve Strickland defeated "Hangman" Adam Page. The event was also notable for the AEW debut of Adam Copeland (formerly known as Edge in WWE).

== Production ==
=== Background ===
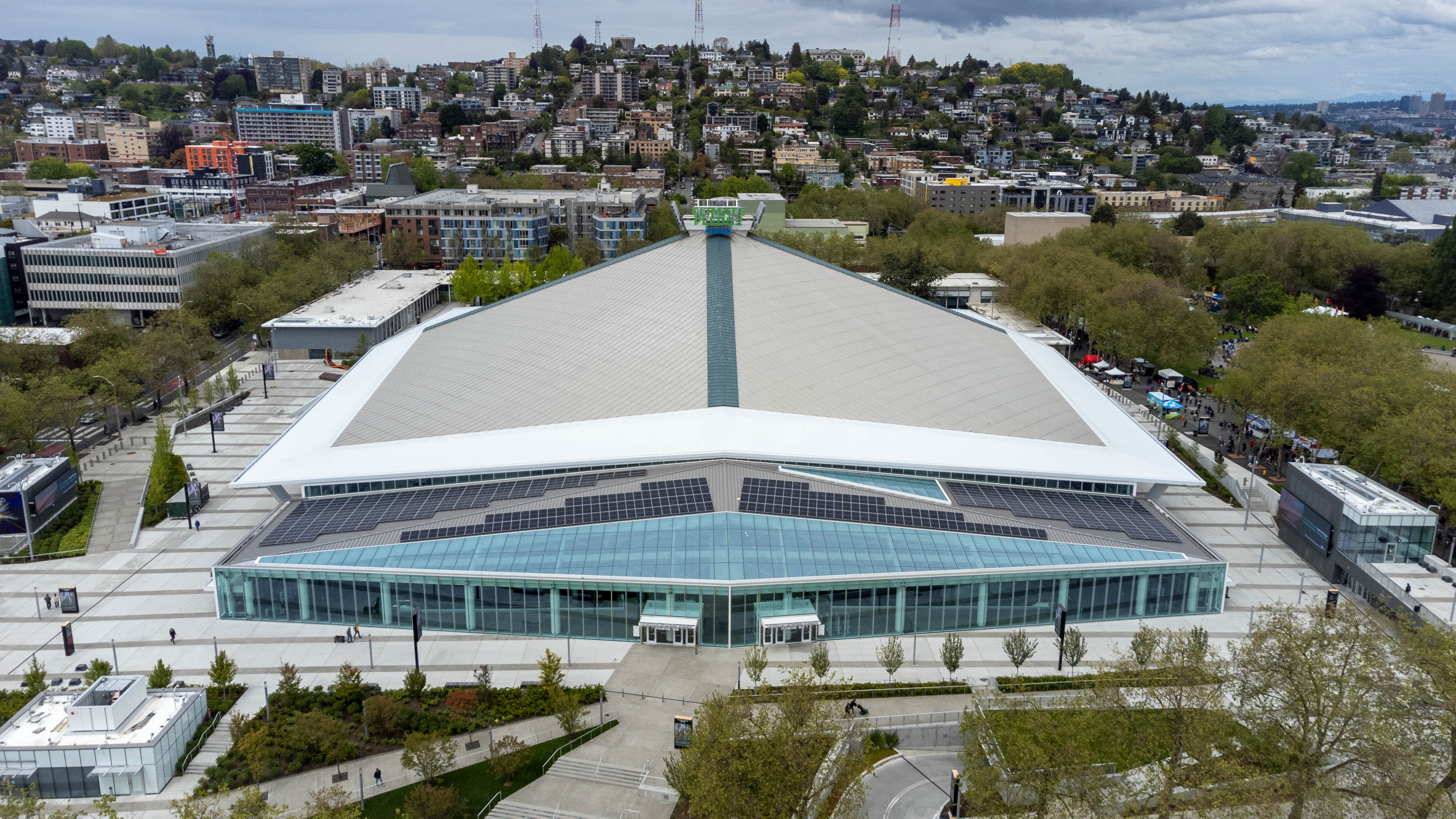
The inaugural WrestleDream took place at the Climate Pledge Arena in Seattle, Washington, marking All Elite Wrestling's first pay-per-view event to be held in Washington state.

On October 1, 2022 (September 30 in Eastern Time), Antonio Inoki, the founder of the Japanese professional wrestling promotion New Japan Pro-Wrestling (NJPW), died. Prior to his death, the American promotion All Elite Wrestling (AEW) began a working partnership with NJPW in early 2021. This resulted in the annual co-promoted event, AEW x NJPW: Forbidden Door, which was first held in June 2022.

In April 2023, AEW filed to trademark "AEW WrestleDream". During the All In media scrum on August 27, AEW president Tony Khan officially announced that AEW would hold a pay-per-view (PPV) event titled WrestleDream, which would be held in honor of Inoki, who was someone Khan looked up to in the professional wrestling industry. The event was scheduled to take place on October 1, 2023—the one-year anniversary of Inoki's death—at Climate Pledge Arena in Seattle, Washington, marking AEW's first PPV to be held in the state of Washington. The name of the event refers to Inoki, who Khan called "wrestling's greatest dreamer". Tickets went on sale on September 8, 2023.

=== Storylines ===
WrestleDream featured 14 professional wrestling matches, including four on the pre-show, that involved different wrestlers from pre-existing feuds and storylines. These storylines were produced on AEW's weekly television programs, Dynamite, Rampage, and Collision.

Bryan Danielson was originally set to face NJPW's Zack Sabre Jr. at Forbidden Door in June 2022, but was unable to due to an injury and was replaced by Claudio Castagnoli. Over a year later on the September 9, 2023, episode of Collision, Danielson said that with his career winding down, the next person he wanted to face was Sabre. Later, a match between the two was officially announced for WrestleDream.

During the All In Zero Hour pre-show, Better Than You Bay Bay (Adam Cole and MJF) won the ROH World Tag Team Championship. At Rampage: Grand Slam on September 22, The Righteous (Dutch and Vincent) won a four-way tag team match to earn a title match at WrestleDream. However, two days prior at Dynamite: Grand Slam, as Cole came out to support MJF in his AEW World Championship match, Cole broke his foot jumping off the entrance ramp. The following week, Better Than You Bay Bay initially announced that they would have to relinquish the ROH World Tag Team Championship, but MJF instead decided that he would defend the title in a handicap match against The Righteous at WrestleDream.

After racking up wins and taking out her opponents in post-match attacks, on the September 23 episode of Collision, The House of Black's Brody King announced that Julia Hart wanted to face Kris Statlander for the AEW TBS Championship, and if Statlander did not accept, Hart would continue laying waste to her opponents. Later that night, it was made official that Statlander would defend the TBS Championship against Hart at WrestleDream. Hart's last loss was against Statlander on an episode of Dark in April 2022.

After Luchasaurus won the AEW TNT Championship in June, his accomplice Christian Cage claimed that he himself was the real champion and carried around the title. On the September 23 episode of Collision, Luchasaurus defended the title against Cage and Darby Allin in a three-way match. In the end, Allin performed a coffin drop on Luchasaurus but Cage threw Allin out of the ring and pinned Luchasaurus to become the actual TNT Champion. Later, Cage challenged Allin to a two out of three falls match at WrestleDream, which was made official.

Since siding with Don Callis at Double or Nothing in May 2023, Konosuke Takeshita vowed to destroy Callis' former client Kenny Omega, gaining upset wins over Omega in the two prior AEW PPVs, All In during a trios match and at All Out in a singles match. In order to further hurt Omega, Callis and Takeshita announced their new target as Omega's former Golden Lovers tag team partner, Kota Ibushi, with the duo shown to have completed their assault on Ibushi in Japan on the September 27 episode of Dynamite. Subsequently, Callis also began a feud with longtime friend Chris Jericho, where he betrayed Jericho in August. Callis then helped Will Ospreay to defeat Jericho at All In. Following this, Jericho's protege Sammy Guevara betrayed Jericho on September 20 at Dynamite: Grand Slam, defecting to join Callis. Following Omega saving Jericho from an attack by Callis, Takeshita, and Guevara, it was announced that Omega would team with former rival Jericho and a returning Ibushi to face The Don Callis Family (Takeshita, Guevara, and Ospreay) at WrestleDream.

== Event ==
Other on-screen personnel
Role	Name
Commentators	Excalibur (Pre-show and PPV)
Commentators	Nigel McGuinness (Pre-show and PPV)
Commentators	Jim Ross (Pre-show and PPV)
Commentators	Taz (PPV)
Commentators	Tony Schiavone (PPV)
Commentators	Jon Moxley (Castagnoli vs. Barnett, Starks vs. Yuta, and Danielson vs. Sabre Jr.)
Ring announcers	Justin Roberts
Ring announcers	Dasha Gonzalez
Ring announcers	Bobby Cruise
Referees	Aubrey Edwards
Referees	Bryce Remsburg
Referees	Paul Turner
Referees	Rick Knox
Referees	Stephon Smith
Referees	Taito Nakabayashi
Pre-show hosts	Renee Paquette
Pre-show hosts	RJ City
Pre-show hosts	Stokely Hathaway

=== Pre-show ===
Before the Zero-Hour pre-show started, AEW president Tony Khan and NJPW representatives, including Naoto and Hirota Inoki, the grandsons of NJPW founder Antonio Inoki, delivered an opening ceremony for Antonio.

There were four matches contested on the WrestleDream Zero Hour pre-show. In the first match, Athena, Billie Starkz, Keith Lee, and Satoshi Kojima faced Shane Taylor Promotions (Lee Moriarty and Shane Taylor), Diamanté, and Mercedes Martinez in an eight-person mixed tag team match. In the closing stages, Starkz delivered a spinning kick to both Diamanté and Martinez, Taylor hit a headbutt to Kojima, Lee performed a spinebuster to Taylor, Athena delivered the O-Face to Moriarty, Lee performed the Big Bang Catastrophe to Moriarty, and Kojima delivered the Cozy lariat to Moriarty and pinned him for the win.

In the next match, Claudio Castagnoli (with Jon Moxley) faced Josh Barnett. In the closing stages, Claudio delivered the Giant Swing and then locked in the Sharpshooter, but Barnett escaped. Castagnoli then performed the Neutralizer and then locked in the Octopus Stretch, but Barnett escaped. Castagnoli then used an inside cradle on Barnett for the win. After the match, Barnett praised Castagnoli and told him that he wanted a rematch.

Next, Luchasaurus faced Nick Wayne. In the closing stages, Luchasaurus delivered a chokeslam and a German Suplex to Wayne, but Wayne then performed a moonsault for a two count. As Wayne attempted Wayne's World, Luchasaurus blocked it and delivered an Emerald Flowsion and a Northern lariat for the win.

In the final match of the pre-show, Billy Gunn and The Acclaimed (Anthony Bowens and Max Caster) defended the AEW World Trios Championship against TMDK (Bad Dude Tito, Mikey Nicholls, and Shane Haste). In the closing stages, Tito delivered a short-arm exploder suplex to Bowens for a two count. As Gunn attempted the Fameasser, Tiro ducked it and delivered an enzeguiri/German suplex combination to Gunn, but Caster broke up the pinfall attempt. The Acclaimed then performed the Arrival/Mic Drop combination to Tito and then pinned him for the win.

=== Preliminary matches ===
The actual pay-per-view opened with MJF defending the ROH World Tag Team Championship against The Righteous (Vincent and Dutch) in a 2-on-1 handicap match due to MJF's partner, Adam Cole, being injured. In the opening stages, Vincent and Dutch delivered a ripcord lariat/basement flatliner combination for a two count. Dutch and Vincent then performed a Bossman Slam/Swanton Bomb for a nearfall. As Vincent attempted another Swanton Bomb, MJF moved out of the way and delivered a bodyslam to Vincent. MJF then hit the Kangaroo Kick to Vincent and Dutch, and followed up with a Heat Seeker to Dutch (with MJF's feet on the ropes, unbeknownst to the referee), and pinned him for the win.

In the next match, Eddie Kingston defended both the ROH World Championship and NJPW's Strong Openweight Championship against Katsuyori Shibata. In the end, Shibata locked in a Figure Four Leglock on Kingston, but Kingston reached the ropes. Kingston then delivered a Saito suplex and corner clotheslines to Shibata. Shibata then performed a half-hatch suplex for a two count. Shibata then delivered the PK, but Kingston countered with the Backfist to the Future for a one count. Kingston then delivered a Northern Lights Bomb or a two count. Kingston then performed a Backfist to the Future/Powerbomb combination and then pinned Shibata for the win to retain.

Next, Kris Statlander defended the AEW TBS Championship against Julia Hart (accompanied by Brody King). In the climax, Julia delivered a senton to the back of Statlander. Statlander then performed a powerslam and a Blue Thunder Bomb for a two count. Juila then delivered an avalanche Spider German suplex and a moonsault, but Statlander reached the ropes. Julia then locked in the Heartless submission, but Statlander impeded it with the Sunday Night Fever and then pinned Hart to retain the title.

The next match was a fatal four-way tag team match for a future AEW World Tag Team Championship match, contested between The Young Bucks (Matt Jackson and Nick Jackson), The Gunns (Austin Gunn and Colten Gunn), The Lucha Brothers (Rey Fenix and Penta El Zero Miedo, and the team of Hook and Orange Cassidy. In the end, Matt delivered a rolling northern lights suplex, but Hook then performed his own rolling northern lights suplex. Hook then delivered a Saito suplex to Nick. Penta then hit a diving crossbody/slingblade/DDT/lungblower/superkick combination to Colten. Penta then delivered a superkick and the Penta Driver to Colten, but Austin broke up the pinfall attempt. Cassidy then performed the Orange Punch to Austin and Hook locked in the RedRum on Austin, but Nick hit a 450° splash to break up the submission attempt. The Young Bucks then hit superkicks to Hook and Colten and then performed the BTE Trigger to Penta and pinned him for the win.

In the fourth match, Swerve Strickland (accompanied by Prince Nana) faced "Hangman" Adam Page. In the opening stages, Strickland delivered a headscissors and a slingshot dropkick for a two count. Strickland then performed a neckbreaker, but Page countered with a Fallaway Slam. Page then delivered a springboard clothesline, two powerbombs, and the Orihara moonsault, followed by a pop-up Liger Bomb and a diving clothesline for a two count. Strickland performed a step-up enzeguiri, but Page countered with a deadlift German suplex. Strickland performed the rolling flatliner and a brainbuster for a nearfall. Strickland then hit the Swerve Stomp and the House Call for a nearfall. Page then performed the Dead Eye on the stairs. Strickland then delivered an apron Swerve Stomp and a 450° splash for a two count. Strickland then hit a snap German suplex, but as he attempted another Swerve Stomp, Page moved out the way and delivered the Buckshot Lariat for a nearfall. As the referee was ejecting Prince Nana, Strickland hit Page with Nana's crown and delivered two House Calls and the JML Driver for the win.

Next, Ricky Starks faced Wheeler Yuta. In the closing stages, Starks delivered a powerbomb and a DDT for a two count. Yuta then used a seatbelt pin on Starks, but Starks kicked out. Starks then performed a spear and the Roshambo and pinned Yuta for the win.

In the next match, Bryan Danielson faced Zack Sabre Jr. In the opening stages, Sabre locked in a Cobra Twist, but Danielson shifted it into a pin for a two count. Danielson then locked in a Half-crab, but Sabre transitioned into a cross arm breaker. Danielson then locked in an Indian Death Lock, but Sabre escaped. Sabre then locked in the Romeo Special, but Danielson escaped and attempted a pin for a one count. Sabre then delivered an uppercut and locked in a double-crab. Danielson then performed an avalanche butterfly suplex and locked in a single-leg crab, but Sabre reached the bottom rope. Danielson then locked in the Tequila Special, but Sabre escaped. Danielson then delivered the Yes! Kicks/Roundhouse Kick combination, but as he attempted the Busaiku Knee, Sabre blocked it and hit a European Clutch for a nearfall. Danielson then locked in the Cattle Mutilation, but Sabre transitioned into the omoplata. Sabre then delivered a backslide pin for a two count. Sabre then performed a Zack Driver and locked in a double armbar, but Danielson reached the bottom rope. Danielson then stomped on Sabre's face and delivered a Regal-Plex and two Busaiku Knees for the win. After the match, Danielson extended his hand to Sabre in a show of respect, but Sabre refused to shake his hand.

Next, The Don Callis Family (Konosuke Takeshita, Will Ospreay, and Sammy Guevara, accompanied by Don Callis) faced Chris Jericho and The Golden Elite (Kenny Omega and Kota Ibushi) in a trios match. In the opening stages, Omega delivered a Finlay Roll, but as he attempted a moonsault, Ospreay got the knees up. Ospreay and Guevara then performed a Cobra Twist/Senton Atomico to Omega, but Ibushi broke up the pin attempt. Guevara then delivered a bulldog to Jericho. Ibushi then hit a standing moonsault to Guevara for a two count. Omega then delivered a Kotaro Krusher and tagged Jericho, who performed a Lionsault to Guevara. Jericho then locked in the Walls of Jericho on Guevara, but Takeshita used a German suplex on Jericho to break up the submission attempt. Takeshita then delivered a German suplex to Omega and an O'Connor Roll German suplex to Ibushi. Guevara then performed a standing Spanish Fly and an outside shooting star press to everyone. Omega then delivered a dragon suplex to Ospreay, who then hit a powerbomb to Ibushi, and Guevara performed a Judas Effect to Jericho for a one count. Takeshita and Ibushi then delivered simultaneous lariats to each other. Ospreay then hit a corkscrew moonsault to Omega and Ibushi. Jericho then performed a Judas Effect to Ospreay and an avalanche Frankensteiner to Guevara for a two count. Unbeknownst to the referee, Callis hit Jericho with a bat, allowing Guevara to pin Jericho and win the match for his team.

In the penultimate match, FTR (Dax Harwood and Cash Wheeler) defended the AEW World Tag Team Championship against Aussie Open (Kyle Fletcher and Mark Davis). In the closing stages, Aussie Open performed a double powerbomb to Harwood for a two count. Harwood then delivered three German suplexes to Fletcher. Aussie Open then hit the Aussie Arrow to Harwood for a two count. Harwood then performed a slingshot powerbomb to Davis for a two count. FTR then delivered a superplex/diving splash combination on Davis, but Fletcher broke up the pinfall attempt. Aussie Open then hit the Shatter Machine and the Coreolis on Wheeler, but Harwood broke up the pin attempt. FTR then delivered an apron assisted spike piledriver to Davis and an avalanche Shatter Machine to Fletcher for the win to retain.

=== Main event ===
In the main event, Christian Cage defended the TNT Championship against Darby Allin in a two out of three falls match. In the opening stages, Allin locked in a hammerlock submission and delivered a back heel trip. Allin then performed two headlock takedowns. As Allin attempted a Sunset Flip, Christian blocked it. As Cage attempted the Killswitch, Allin countered it into a jackknife pin for the first fall. Allin then performed the Code Red and a springboard Coffin Drop to Christian for a two count. Allin then used a rolling crucifix pin on Christian for another nearfall. As Christian was distracted by Nick Wayne's mom in the crowd, Allin delivered a suicide dive and a Coffin Drop to Christian. As Allin attempted another Coffin Drop, Christian got the knees up and delivered a bodyslam to Allin onto the apron. Christian then hit a powerslam and a Death Valley Driver to Allin onto the steel steps, and Allin was unable to make it back in the ring before the count of 10, thus Christian won his first fall by countout. As Allin was being carried out by a gurney, Christian delivered a frog splash to Allin on the gurney. Christian then removed the padding in the ring and performed a Killswitch to Allin onto the exposed ring boards for a two count. Christian then locked in the Scorpion Deathlock on Allin, but Allin reached the bottom rope. Allin then delivered the Scorpion Deathdrop and the Coffin Drop to Christian for a two count. Christian then hit a sunset flip powerbomb to Allin onto the exposed ring boards for a nearfall. Christian then inadvertently delivered a spear to referee Bryce Remsburg, and while the ref was down, hit a low blow to Allin. As Christian attempted to hit Allin with the title belt, Nick Wayne came down to the ring. Wayne feigned siding with Allin and then turned on Allin and hit him with the title belt, thus turning heel in the process for the first time in his AEW career. Christian then covered Allin to secure his second and final fall to retain.

After the match, Christian and Wayne attacked Allin, but while Sting came down to the ring to stop the beatdown, Luchasaurus came out and hit Sting. As Christian attempted a con-chair-to to Sting, the lights went out and a vignette aired of a mysterious man driving around Seattle. The mysterious man was then revealed as Adam Copeland, formerly known as Edge in WWE. Copeland came to the ring and feigned joining his old friend Christian and instead attacked Wayne with a chair and delivered spears to both Wayne and Luchasaurus while Christian retreated. Copeland then shook Allin and Sting's hands.

== Reception ==
WrestleDream received critical acclaim, mainly for the Danielson-Sabre Jr. match and Adam Copeland's debut.

Wrestling journalist Dave Meltzer of the Wrestling Observer Newsletter rated the ROH World Tag Team Championship match 2.75 stars (the lowest rated match on the card), the Kingston–Shibata bout and the four-way tag team match 3.75 stars, the TBS Championship match 3 stars, the Page–Strickland bout and the trios match 4.75 stars, the Yuta–Starks match 3.5 stars, the Danielson–Sabre Jr. match 5.5 stars (the highest rated match on the card), and the AEW World Tag title match and the TNT Championship match 4.5 stars.

== Aftermath ==
During the post-event media scrum, Tony Khan revealed that WrestleDream would continue as an annual pay-per-view for AEW.

Also during the media scrum, it was confirmed that Adam Copeland had signed full-time with AEW, meaning he can wrestle every Wednesday, Friday, and Saturday, and his entrance music, "Metalingus" by Alter Bridge was licensed by AEW. Additionally, it was announced that he would make his Dynamite debut on October 4 to address his appearance at WrestleDream with his first AEW match scheduled for a special Tuesday night Dynamite called Title Tuesday on October 10 against Luchasaurus. On the October 4 episode, after listing off names of potential opponents he had never faced, Copeland explained that he came to AEW because he saw an opportunity to reunite with Christian Cage one last time and end their careers together as a team, and also warned him that Luchasaurus and Nick Wayne would eventually turn on him. Cage embraced Copeland, but then crudely rejected him. Luchasaurus and Wayne then came out but Copeland fended them off. Copeland then defeated Luchasaurus in his AEW in-ring debut at Dynamite: Title Tuesday. This would then lead to a trios match at Full Gear, pitting Copeland, Sting, and Darby Allin against Cage, Luchasaurus, and Wayne.

== Results ==
No.	Results	Stipulations	Times
1^{P}	Athena, Billie Starkz, Keith Lee, and Satoshi Kojima defeated Shane Taylor Promotions (Lee Moriarty and Shane Taylor), Diamanté, and Mercedes Martinez by pinfall	Eight-person mixed tag team match	5:45
2^{P}	Claudio Castagnoli (with Jon Moxley) defeated Josh Barnett by pinfall	Singles match	8:15
3^{P}	Luchasaurus defeated Nick Wayne by pinfall	Singles match	4:55
4^{P}	Billy Gunn and The Acclaimed (Anthony Bowens and Max Caster) (c) defeated TMDK (Bad Dude Tito, Mikey Nicholls, and Shane Haste) by pinfall	Trios match for the AEW World Trios Championship	9:20
5	MJF (c) (Note: Co-champion Adam Cole was originally scheduled to team up with MJF to defend the titles, but pulled out due to suffering a broken ankle.) defeated The Righteous (Dutch and Vincent) by pinfall	2-on-1 handicap match for the ROH World Tag Team Championship	9:40
6	Eddie Kingston (c) defeated Katsuyori Shibata by pinfall	Singles match for the ROH World Championship and NJPW Strong Openweight Championship	11:00
7	Kris Statlander (c) defeated Julia Hart (with Brody King) by pinfall	Singles match for the AEW TBS Championship	9:00
8	The Young Bucks (Matt Jackson and Nick Jackson) defeated The Lucha Brothers (Penta El Zero Miedo and Rey Fenix) (with Alex Abrahantes), The Gunns (Austin Gunn and Colten Gunn), and Orange Cassidy and Hook by pinfall	Four-way tag team match for a future AEW World Tag Team Championship match	12:40
9	Swerve Strickland (with Prince Nana) defeated "Hangman" Adam Page by pinfall	Singles match	20:15
10	Ricky Starks defeated Wheeler Yuta by pinfall	Singles match	9:55
11	Bryan Danielson defeated Zack Sabre Jr. by pinfall	Singles match	22:45
12	The Don Callis Family (Konosuke Takeshita, Will Ospreay, and Sammy Guevara) (with Don Callis) defeated Chris Jericho and The Golden Elite (Kenny Omega and Kota Ibushi) by pinfall	Trios match	22:35
13	FTR (Dax Harwood and Cash Wheeler) (c) defeated Aussie Open (Kyle Fletcher and Mark Davis) by pinfall	Tag team match for the AEW World Tag Team Championship	20:25
14	Christian Cage (c) defeated Darby Allin 2–1	Two out of three falls match for the AEW TNT Championship	25:25
(c) / – the champion(s) heading into the match; P / – the match was broadcast on the pre-show
