= Rick Knox =

American professional wrestling referee

Personal information
- Born: December 11, 1968 (age 57) Riverside, California, U.S.

Professional wrestling career
- Ring name: Rick Knox
- Debut: 2003

Rick Knox (born December 11, 1968) is an American professional wrestling referee signed to All Elite Wrestling (AEW), and has previously worked for Pro Wrestling Guerilla and the National Wrestling Alliance.

== Career ==
Knox began his career on the independent circuit, notably with Pro Wrestling Guerilla, and also refereed for the inaugural All In event that led to the creation of All Elite Wrestling. He made his AEW debut during the first pay-per-view, on May 25, 2019, at Double or Nothing

On September 20, 2023, at AEW Grand Slam, Knox refereed an AEW International Championship match between Jon Moxley and Rey Fenix. During the match Moxley suffered a concussion and rather than counting to three and ending the match, he instead allowed Fenix to perform a second piledriver on Moxley before ending the match.

== Championships and accomplishments ==
- DDT Pro-Wrestling
  - Ironman Heavymetalweight Championship (1 time)
