= 2024 in professional wrestling =

2024 in professional wrestling describes the year's events in the world of professional wrestling.

== List of promotions ==
These promotions held events throughout 2024.

Promotion Name	Abbreviation	Notes
AAW Wrestling	AAW	The "AAW" abbreviation has been used since 2007 and had previously stood for the promotion's original name All American Wrestling.
All Elite Wrestling	AEW	
All Japan Pro Wrestling	AJPW	
Combat Zone Wrestling	CZW	
Consejo Mundial de Lucha Libre	CMLL	
CyberFight	CF	CyberFight is an umbrella brand that oversees and promotes three individual promotions: DDT Pro-Wrestling (DDT), Pro Wrestling Noah (Noah), and Tokyo Joshi Pro Wrestling (TJPW).
Deadlock Pro-Wrestling	DPW	
DEFY Wrestling	DEFY	
Dragongate	DG	
Dream Star Fighting Marigold	Marigold	
Empire Wrestling Federation	EWF	
Game Changer Wrestling	GCW	
German Wrestling Federation	GWF	
House of Glory	HOG	
Juggalo Championship Wrestling	JCW	
Lucha Libre AAA Worldwide	AAA	The "AAA" abbreviation has been used since the mid-1990s and had previously stood for the promotion's original name Asistencia Asesoría y Administración.
Major League Wrestling	MLW	
Maple Leaf Pro Wrestling	MLP	Relaunch of the former Maple Leaf Wrestling, acquired by Scott D'Amore.
National Wrestling Alliance	NWA	
New Japan Pro-Wrestling	NJPW	
Progress Wrestling	PROGRESS	
Pro Wrestling Zero1	Zero1	
Revolution Pro Wrestling	RevPro	
Ring of Honor	ROH	
Total Nonstop Action Wrestling	TNA	Originally founded as TNA, the company was renamed to Impact Wrestling in 2017, but reverted to the TNA name on January 13, 2024.
Westside Xtreme Wrestling	wXw	
Women of Wrestling	WOW	
World Wonder Ring Stardom	Stardom	
WWE	—	"WWE" stands for World Wrestling Entertainment, which remains the company's legal name, though the company ceased using the full name in April 2011, with the WWE abbreviation becoming an orphaned initialism. WWE divided its roster into three storyline divisions – referred to as brands where wrestlers exclusively performed on their respective weekly television programs. Raw and SmackDown were their two main brands, while NXT served as their developmental territory.

== Calendar of notable shows ==
=== January ===
Date	Promotion(s)	Event	Location	Venue	Main Event	Notes
1	WWE: Raw	Day 1	San Diego, California	Pechanga Arena	Seth "Freakin" Rollins (c) defeated Drew McIntyre to retain the World Heavyweight Championship	Aired as a special episode of Raw. Featured The Rock's first appearance on Raw since January 25, 2016.
2	CF: Noah	The New Year	Tokyo, Japan	Ariake Arena	Kota Ibushi defeated Naomichi Marufuji	
2	WWE: NXT	New Year's Evil	Orlando, Florida	WWE Performance Center	Trick Williams defeated Grayson Waller to retain his Iron Survivor Challenge title opportunity for the NXT Championship	Aired as a special episode of NXT.
3	Stardom	New Years Stars	Yokohama, Japan	Yokohama Budokan	Abarenbo GE (Syuri, Mirai and Ami Sohrei) defeated Baribari Bombers (Giulia, Thekla and Mai Sakurai) (c) in the Triangle Derby finals to win the Artist of Stardom Championship	
4	Stardom	Ittenyon Stardom Gate	Tokyo, Japan	Tokyo Dome City Hall	Mayu Iwatani (c) defeated Syuri to retain the IWGP Women's Championship	
4	CF: TJPW	Tokyo Joshi Pro '24	Tokyo, Japan	Korakuen Hall	Miyu Yamashita (c) defeated Masha Slamovich to retain the Princess of Princess Championship	
4	NJPW	Wrestle Kingdom 18	Tokyo, Japan	Tokyo Dome	Tetsuya Naito defeated Sanada (c) to win the IWGP World Heavyweight Championship	Featured the crowning of the inaugural IWGP Global Heavyweight Champion, the first NJPW event under the presidency of Hiroshi Tanahashi, and first Wrestle Kingdom event to take place under a one-night format since Wrestle Kingdom 13.
5	NJPW	New Year Dash!!	Tokyo, Japan	Sumida City Gymnasium	TMDK (Zack Sabre Jr., Kosei Fujita, Shane Haste and Mikey Nicholls) defeated Chaos (Tomohiro Ishii and Kazuchika Okada) and Blackpool Combat Club (Jon Moxley and Bryan Danielson)	
5	WWE: SmackDown	New Year's Revolution	Vancouver, British Columbia, Canada	Rogers Arena	Randy Orton vs. LA Knight vs. AJ Styles to determine the #1 contender for the Undisputed WWE Universal Championship at the Royal Rumble ended in a no contest	First New Year's Revolution event since 2007. Aired as a special episode of SmackDown. Featured the return of The Authors of Pain (Akam and Rezar) for the first time since March 2020.
5	Prestige	Roseland 7	Portland, Oregon	Roseland Theater	Alex Shelley (c) defeated Nick Wayne, Alan Angels and Chris Sabin to retain the Prestige World Championship	
6	MLW	Kings of Colosseum	Philadelphia, Pennsylvania	2300 Arena	Matt Riddle defeated Jacob Fatu	Featured the MLW returns of Sami Callihan and Matt Riddle.
6	MLW	Reload	Philadelphia, Pennsylvania	2300 Arena	Satoshi Kojima defeated Sami Callihan	Aired on tape delay on January 20.
6	HOG	Brace For Impact	New York City, New York	NYC Arena	Mike Santana (c) defeated Josh Alexander to retain the HOG Heavyweight Championship	
7	GWF	Strike First, Strike Hard 4	Berlin, Germany	Festsaal Kreuzberg	Mike D Vecchio (c) defeated Erkan Sulcani to retain the GWF World Championship	
10	AEW	Homecoming; Night 1	Jacksonville, Florida	Daily's Place	Darby Allin and Sting defeated The Don Callis Family (Powerhouse Hobbs and Konosuke Takeshita) in a Texas Tornado match	First Homecoming event since 2021. Aired as a special episode of Dynamite.
10	AEW	Homecoming; Night 2	Jacksonville, Florida	Daily's Place	The Dark Order (Evil Uno, Alex Reynolds and John Silver) defeated Jake Hager, Matt Menard and Angelo Parker	Aired on tape delay on January 12 as a special episode of Rampage.
12	GCW	No Compadre	Chicago, Illinois	Thalia Hall	Mustafa Ali defeated Gringo Loco	
13	AEW	Battle of the Belts IX	Norfolk, Virginia	Chartway Arena	Orange Cassidy (c) defeated Preston Vance to retain the AEW International Championship	
13	CF: Noah	Star Navigation; Night 1	Tokyo, Japan	Korakuen Hall	Kenoh (c) defeated Go Shiozaki to retain the GHC Heavyweight Championship	
13	NJPW	Battle in the Valley	San Jose, California	San Jose Civic	Kazuchika Okada defeated Will Ospreay	Featured an appearance by suspended AEW wrestler Jack Perry
13	TNA	Hard To Kill	Paradise, Nevada	Pearl Theater at Palms Casino Resort	Moose defeated Alex Shelley (c) to win the TNA World Championship	First PPV event to be held under the TNA banner since Bound for Glory in October 2016. The company was renamed to Impact Wrestling in 2017, but reverted to its original TNA name beginning with this event.
13	GCW	56 Birdz	Columbus, Ohio	Valley Dale Ballroom	Jonathan Gresham defeated Cole Radrick	
13	NWA	Paranoia	Fort Lauderdale, Florida	Revolution Live	EC3 (c) defeated Matt Cardona in an Ultimate Deathmatch to retain the NWA Worlds Heavyweight Championship	Taping for NWA Powerrr.
13	NWA	Viva Revolution	Fort Lauderdale, Florida	Revolution Live	Jackal Stevens (c) defeated Kerry Morton to retain the CCW Heavyweight Championship	
14	TNA	Snake Eyes	Paradise, Nevada	Pearl Theater at Palms Casino Resort	Kazuchika Okada and Motor City Machine Guns (Chris Sabin and Alex Shelley) defeated The System (Brian Myers, Eddie Edwards, and Moose)	Taping for TNA Impact! and TNA Xplosion.
17	CF: Noah	Sunny Voyage	Tokyo, Japan	Shinjuku Face	Jack Morris (c) defeated Titus Alexander to retain the GHC National Championship	
20	NJPW	The New Beginning in Nagoya	Nagoya, Aichi, Japan	Aichi Prefectural Gymnasium	Evil defeated Tama Tonga (c) in a Lumberjack match to win the NEVER Openweight Championship	
20	DPW	Live 4	Raleigh, North Carolina	Kerr Scott Building	Calvin Tankman (c) defeated Andrew Everett to reatin the DPW Worlds Championship	
21	DPW	You Already Know	Raleigh, North Carolina	Kerr Scott Building	Calvin Tankman (c) defeated Colby Corino in a Steel Cage match to reatin the DPW Worlds Championship	Aired on tape delay on January 28.
25	REVOLVER	Mox vs. Gringo	Dayton, Ohio	Calumet Center at Montgomery County Fairgrounds	Jon Moxley defeated Gringo Loco in a Lucha Deathmatch	
26	GCW	Look At Me	Tampa, Florida	Egypt Shrine Center	Mance Warner vs. Effy ended in a no contest	
27	GCW	Effy's Big Gay Brunch 8	Tampa, Florida	Egypt Shrine Center	Bussy (Allie Katch and Effy) defeated MxM (Mansoor and Mason D. Madden)	
27	WWE: Raw; SmackDown	Royal Rumble	St. Petersburg, Florida	Tropicana Field	Cody Rhodes won the 30-man Royal Rumble match by last eliminating CM Punk to earn a world championship match at WrestleMania XL	
28	CF: DDT	Sweet Dreams!	Tokyo, Japan	Korakuen Hall	Yuki Ueno (c) defeated Yukio Naya to retain the KO-D Openweight Championship	
28	Progress	Chapter 162: The Light Of The Dragon	London, England	Electric Ballroom	Kid Lykos defeated Connor Mills, Gene Munny, Luke Jacobs, Mark Haskins, Tate Mayfairs and Yoichi to determine the #1 contender to the PROGRESS World Championship	
(c) – denotes defending champion(s)

=== February ===
Date	Promotion(s)	Event	Location	Main Event	Notes
3	AAA	Rey de Reyes	Mexico City, Mexico	El Hijo del Vikingo defeated Laredo Kid and El Texano Jr. to win the Rey de Reyes	
3	MLW	SuperFight	Philadelphia, Pennsylvania	Satoshi Kojima defeated Alex Kane (c) to win the MLW World Heavyweight Championship	
3	MLW	Burning Crush	Philadelphia, Pennsylvania	Mads Krule Krügger defeated Jacob Fatu in a Baklei Brawl	Aired on tape delay on February 17.
3	GCW	The Coldest Winter 2	Los Angeles, California	Blake Christian (c) defeated Dark Sheik to retain the GCW World Championship	
4	CF: Noah	Cross Over in Sendai	Sendai, Japan	El Hijo de Dr. Wagner Jr. defeated Kenoh (c) to win the GHC Heavyweight Championship	
4	Stardom	Supreme Fight	Yokohama, Japan	Maika (c) defeated Saya Kamitani to retain the World of Stardom Championship	
4	WWE: NXT	Vengeance Day	Clarksville, Tennessee	Ilja Dragunov (c) defeated Trick Williams to retain the NXT Championship	
4	GCW	Feel No Ways	Mesa, Arizona	Richard Holliday defeated Hammerstone	
4	GWF	Global Warming	Berlin, Germany	Mike D Vecchio (c) defeated Yoichi to retain the GWF World Championship	
9	DEFY	Seven	Seattle, Washington	Mustafa Ali defeated Judas Icarus	
11	NJPW	The New Beginning in Osaka	Osaka, Japan	Bullet Club War Dogs (David Finlay, Alex Coughlin, Gabe Kidd, Clark Connors and Drilla Moloney) defeated United Empire (Will Ospreay, Francesco Akira, TJP, Great-O-Khan and Henare) in a Steel Cage match	Featured Will Ospreay's final match in NJPW.
12	NJPW; CMLL	Fantastica Mania	Osaka, Japan	Hiroshi Tanahashi, Místico and Máscara Dorada defeated Último Guerrero, Francesco Akira and Stuka Jr.	
13	NJPW; CMLL	Fantastica Mania	Osaka, Japan	Hiroshi Tanahashi, Templario and Volador Jr. defeated Douki, Rocky Romero and Soberano Jr.	
14	NJPW; CMLL	Fantastica Mania	Takamatsu, Japan	El Desperado, Hechicero and Último Guerrero defeated Atlantis Jr., Hiroshi Tanahashi and Místico	
16	NJPW; CMLL	Fantastica Mania	Nagoya, Japan	Los Guerreros Laguneros (Último Guerrero and Stuka Jr.) defeated Los Ingobernables de Japon (Bushi and Titán) in an Interfaction Tag Team Tournament semifinal	
17	NJPW; CMLL	Fantastica Mania	Chiba, Japan	Los Guerreros Laguneros (Último Guerrero and Stuka Jr.) defeated Los Depredadores (Magnus and Volador Jr.) in an Interfaction Tag Team Tournament final	
17	REVOLVER	Whatashow	Grand Prairie, Texas	Alex Shelley (c) defeated JD Griffey, Alan Angels and Exodus Prime to retain the REVOLVER Championship	
18	RevPro	High Stakes: Ospreay vs. Oku	London, England	Michael Oku (c) defeated Will Ospreay to retain the Undisputed British Heavyweight Championship	Featured Will Ospreay's final match in RevPro.
18	DPW	Forever	Pasadena, Texas	Bryan Keith (c) defeated Jake Something to retain the DPW National Championship	Aired on tape delay on February 24.
19	NJPW; CMLL	Fantastica Mania	Tokyo, Japan	Máscara Dorada defeated Stuka Jr.	
23	CF: Noah	Star Navigation; Night 2	Tokyo, Japan	Good Looking Guys (Yo-Hey and Tadasuke) (c) defeated Hayata and Eita to retain the GHC Junior Heavyweight Tag Team Championship	
23	TNA	No Surrender	Westwego, Louisiana	Mustafa Ali defeated Chris Sabin to win the TNA X Division Championship	
23	GCW	Touch The Sky	Dallas, Texas	Mance Warner vs. Allie Katch in a Bullrope match ended in a no contest	
23	NJPW	The New Beginning in Sapporo	Sapporo, Japan	Nic Nemeth defeated David Finlay (c) to win the IWGP Global Heavyweight Championship	
24	NJPW	The New Beginning in Sapporo	Sapporo, Japan	Tetsuya Naito (c) defeated Sanada to retain the IWGP World Heavyweight Championship	Featured Kazuchika Okada and Tama Tonga's final matches in NJPW.
24	WWE: Raw; SmackDown	Elimination Chamber: Perth	Perth, Australia	Rhea Ripley (c) defeated Nia Jax to retain the Women's World Championship	WWE's first event to be held in Australia since Super Show-Down in October 2018; only WWE event in 2024 to take place in the Asia–Pacific region.
24	TNA	Bayou Blast	Westwego, Louisiana	Trent Seven defeated Trey Miguel	Taping for TNA Impact! and TNA Xplosion.
25	CF: DDT	Into The Fight	Tokyo, Japan	The37Kamiina (Shunma Katsumata and Yuki Ueno) and Kaisei Takechi defeated Hideki Okatani, Takeshi Masada and Tetsuya Endo	Featured the debut of Exile Tribe performer Kaisei Takechi.
25	Progress	Chapter 163: Twisted Metal	London, England	Kid Lykos (with Kid Lykos II) defeated Spike Trivet (c) (with Smokin' Aces (Charlie Sterling and Nick Riley)) to win the PROGRESS World Championship	
25	Prestige	A Moment of Violence	Los Angeles, California	Mustafa Ali defeated Mike Bailey	
29	MLW	Intimidation Games	Queens, New York	Satoshi Kojima (c) defeated Minoru Suzuki to retain the MLW World Heavyweight Championship	
29	MLW	Once Upon A Time In New York	Queens, New York	Alex Kane and CozyMax (Satoshi Kojima and Shigeo Okumura) defeated World Titan Federation (Josh Bishop, Richard Holliday and Tom Lawlor)	Aired on tape delay on March 16.
(c) – denotes defending champion(s)

=== March ===
Date	Promotion(s)	Event	Location	Main Event	Notes
1	Progress	Chapter 164: For The Love Of Progress 2	Manchester, England	Rhio (c) defeated Debbie Keitel to retain the Progress World Women's Championship	
1	GCW	Project GCW	Sauget, Illinois	Mance Warner defeated 1 Called Manders in a St. Louis Street Fight	
2	GCW	Keep In Touch	Indianapolis, Indiana	Mance Warner defeated "Spyder" Nate Webb	
2	IWS; GCW	IWS Vs. GCW: UnFnSanctioned 25th Anniversary	Montreal, Quebec, Canada	Team IWS (The Green Phantom, Mathieu St-Jacques, PCP Crazy Manny and SeXXXy Eddy) defeated Team GCW (Joey Janela, Jimmy Lloyd and Bussy (Effy and Allie Katch)) in an Ultimate Deathmatch	
2	NWA	Hard Times	Dothan, Alabama	Knox and Murdoch defeated The Southern 6 (Kerry Morton and Alex Taylor) in a Steel Cage match	Taping for NWA Powerrr.
2	HOG	Reckoning	New York City, New York	Mike Santana (c) defeated Penta El Zero Miedo to retain the HOG Heavyweight Championship	
3	AEW	Revolution	Greensboro, North Carolina	Darby Allin and Sting (c) defeated The Young Bucks (Matthew Jackson and Nicholas Jackson) in a tornado tag team match to retain the AEW World Tag Team Championship	Featured Sting's retirement match.
5	WWE: NXT	Roadblock	Orlando, Florida	Tony D'Angelo defeated Carmelo Hayes to earn an NXT Championship match at Stand & Deliver	Aired as a special episode of NXT.
6	NJPW	NJPW 52nd Anniversary Show	Tokyo, Japan	Tetsuya Naito (Heavyweight) defeated Sho (Junior Heavyweight) in a Champion vs. Champion match	Held alongside Night 1 of the New Japan Cup.
7	Progress	Progress Chapter 165: Diamond Dust	London, England	Kid Lykos (c) defeated Lio Rush to retain the PROGRESS World Championship	
8	TNA	Sacrifice	Windsor, Ontario, Canada	Moose (c) defeated Eric Young to retain the TNA World Championship	
9	GCW	Ashes to Ashes	Atlantic City, New Jersey	Nick Gage defeated Ryuji Ito in a Deathmatch	
10	GCW	So Much Fun	Atlantic City, New Jersey	Ryuji Ito and Abdullah Kobayashi defeated Los Macizos (Ciclope and Miedo Extremo) in a Deathmatch	
10	DPW	Live 5	Berwyn, Illinois	Bryan Keith (c) defeated Anthony Henry to retain the DPW National Championship	
13	AEW	Big Business	Boston, Massachusetts	Willow Nightingale defeated Riho	Aired as a special episode of Dynamite. Featured the AEW debut of Mercedes Moné.
16	REVOLVER	Ready Or Not!	Clive, Iowa	Red (Alex Colon, Killer Kelly, Rickey Shane Page and Steve Maclin) defeated The Second Gear Crew (Mance Warner, Matthew Justice and 1 Called Manders) and Masha Slamovich in an Elimination Games match	
17	CF: DDT	Judgement	Tokyo, Japan	Yuki Ueno (c) defeated Harashima to retain the KO-D Openweight Championship	
17	CF: Noah	Great Voyage in Yokohama	Yokohama, Japan	Good Looking Guys (Anthony Greene and Jack Morris) (c) defeated Real (Saxon Huxley and Timothy Thatcher) to retain the GHC Tag Team Championship	
17	GWF	Chaos City 9	Berlin, Germany	Mike D Vecchio (c) defeated Toni Harting to retain the GWF World Championship	
20	Stardom	Cinderella Tournament (Final)	Nagoya, Japan	Maika (c) defeated Utami Hayashishita to retain the World of Stardom Championship	
20	NJPW	New Japan Cup (Final)	Niigata, Japan	Yota Tsuji defeated Hirooki Goto in the finals of the New Japan Cup	
23	NJPW	NJPW Academy Showcase	Carson, California	Bad Dude Tito defeated Zane Jay	
23	GCW	Role Model	Detroit, Michigan	Danhausen defeated Matt Cardona	
24	GCW	The Block Is Hot	Rochester, New York	Joey Janela and Sawyer Wreck defeated Blake Christian and Shane Mercer	
24	Prestige	Alive II	Portland, Oregon	Sinner and Saint (Travis Williams and Judas Icarus) (c) defeated C4 (Cody Chhun and Guillermo Rosas) 2–1 in a two-out-of-three falls match to retain the Prestige Tag Team Championship	
28	REVOLVER	Grit Your Teeth	Dayton, Ohio	Alex Shelley (c) defeated Ace Austin to retain the REVOLVER Championship	
29	MLW	War Chamber	St. Petersburg, Florida	Team MLW (The Second Gear Crew (Matthew Justice and 1 Called Manders) and CozyMax (Shigeo Okumura and Satoshi Kojima)) defeated World Titan Federation (Richard Holliday, Davey Boy Smith Jr., Tom Lawlor and Josh Bishop) in a War Chamber match	
29	MLW	War Chamber II	St. Petersburg, Florida	Death Fighters (Raven, Akira, Jake Crist, and Jimmy Lloyd) defeated The Calling (Rickey Shane Page, Sami Callihan, Cannonball, and Talon) in a War Chamber match	Aired on tape delay on April 20.
29	CMLL	Homenaje a Dos Leyendas	Mexico City, Mexico	Blue Panther, Último Guerrero, Volador Jr. and Místico defeated Matt Sydal and Blackpool Combat Club (Jon Moxley, Bryan Danielson, and Claudio Castagnoli)	
31	CF: Noah	Star Navigation; Night 3	Tokyo, Japan	El Hijo de Dr. Wagner Jr. (c) defeated Jake Lee to retain the GHC Heavyweight Championship	
31	CF: TJPW	Grand Princess '24	Tokyo, Japan	Miu Watanabe defeated Miyu Yamashita (c) to win the Princess of Princess Championship	
31	RevPro	Revolution Rumble	London, England	Luke Jacobs won the 30-man Revolution Rumble match by last eliminating Ricky Knight Jr. to earn a future Undisputed British Heavyweight Championship match.	
(c) – denotes defending champion(s)

=== April ===
Date	Promotion(s)	Event	Location	Main Event	Notes
4	Stardom	American Dream in The Keystone State	Philadelphia, Pennsylvania	Maika (c) defeated Megan Bayne to retain the World of Stardom Championship	
4	Independent	Mark Hitchcock Memorial SuperShow	Philadelphia, Pennsylvania	Paul Walter Hauser defeated Sami Callihan in a Philly Street Fight	
4	DEFY	Can't Deny It	Philadelphia, Pennsylvania	Kenta (c) defeated Gringo Loco to retain the DEFY World Championship	
4	GCW	Josh Barnett's Bloodsport X	Philadelphia, Pennsylvania	Josh Barnett defeated Johnny Bloodsport by referee stoppage	
5	GCW	For The Culture	Philadelphia, Pennsylvania	Darius Carter defeated Billy Dixon	
5	GCW	Joey Janela's Spring Break 8	Philadelphia, Pennsylvania	Blake Christian (c) defeated Joey Janela to retain the GCW World Championship	
5	ROH	Supercard of Honor	Philadelphia, Pennsylvania	Mark Briscoe defeated Eddie Kingston (c) to win the ROH World Championship	Featured the crowning of the inaugural ROH Women's World Television Champion.
5	Revolver; HOG	Revolver x HOG	Philadelphia, Pennsylvania	Mustafa Ali (c) defeated Amazing Red to retain the TNA X Division Championship	
5	Progress Wrestling	Progress Chapter 166: Freedom Walks Again	Philadelphia, Pennsylvania	Kid Lykos (c) defeated Man Like DeReiss (with Leon Slater) to retain the PROGRESS World Championship	
5	CF: TJPW	Live In Philly	Philadelphia, Pennsylvania	Maki Itoh and Miyu Yamashita defeated Miu Watanabe and Rika Tatsumi	
6	NJPW	Sakura Genesis	Tokyo, Japan	Tetsuya Naito (c) defeated Yota Tsuji to retain the IWGP World Heavyweight Championship	
6	GCW	Effy's Big Gay Brunch 9	Philadelphia, Pennsylvania	Dark Sheik defeated Sonny Kiss	
6	GCW	GCW vs. TJPW	Philadelphia, Pennsylvania	Maki Itoh, Masha Slamovich and Rina Yamashita defeated Miyu Yamashita, Shoko Nakajima and Yuki Aino	
6	GCW	Joey Janela's Spring Break: Clusterfuck Forever	Philadelphia, Pennsylvania	Microman last eliminated Nick Gage to win the Clusterfuck Battle Royal	
6	WWE: NXT	Stand & Deliver	Philadelphia, Pennsylvania	Trick Williams defeated Carmelo Hayes	Was held midday of WrestleMania XL: Night 1.
6	WWE: Raw; SmackDown	WrestleMania XL	Philadelphia, Pennsylvania	The Bloodline (Roman Reigns and The Rock) defeated Cody Rhodes and Seth "Freakin" Rollins	
7	WWE: Raw; SmackDown	WrestleMania XL	Philadelphia, Pennsylvania	Cody Rhodes defeated Roman Reigns (c) in a Bloodline Rules match to win the Undisputed WWE Universal Championship	
7	CF: DDT	April Fool	Tokyo, Japan	Chris Brookes and Zack Sabre Jr. vs. The37Kamiina (Mao and Yuki Ueno) ended in a time-limit draw	
7	GWF	Mystery Mayhem	Berlin, Germany	Mike D Vecchio (c) defeated Tim Stübing to retain the GWF World Championship	
11	CF: Noah	Star Navigation; Night 4	Tokyo, Japan	Kaito Kiyomiya defeated Kenoh in a number one contendership match for the GHC Heavyweight Championship	
12	NJPW	Windy City Riot	Chicago, Illinois	Jon Moxley defeated Tetsuya Naito (c) to win the IWGP World Heavyweight Championship	
13	AEW	Battle of the Belts X	Highland Heights, Kentucky	Athena (c) defeated Red Velvet to retain the ROH Women's World Championship	
14	NJPW	Wrestling World in Taiwan	Taipei, Taiwan	Toru Yano, Oleg Boltin and Hiroshi Tanahashi defeated House of Torture (Evil, Sho and Yoshinobu Kanemaru) to win the vacant NEVER Openweight 6-Man Tag Team Championship	First major event promoted under the Asia-Pacific Federation of Wrestling (APFW).
14	Prestige	Roseland 8: The 7 Year Anniversary	Portland, Oregon	Zack Sabre Jr. defeated Daniel Makabe	
14	DPW	No Pressure	Durham, North Carolina	Calvin Tankman (c) defeated Mike Bailey to retain the DPW Worlds Championship	Aired on tape delay on April 20.
20	TNA	Rebellion	Paradise, Nevada	Moose (c) defeated Nic Nemeth to retain the TNA World Championship	Featured the TNA returns of Mike Santana, Sami Callihan and Matt Hardy.
20	RevPro	Epic Encounter	Stevenage, England	Michael Oku (c) defeated Zozaya to retain the Undisputed British Heavyweight Championship	
20	GCW	How High	Los Angeles, California	2 Cold Scorpio defeated Joey Janela	
21	GCW	Breaking GCW	Albuquerque, New Mexico	Blake Christian (c) defeated Effy to retain the GCW World Championship	
21	Progress Wrestling	Progress Chapter 167: One Bump Or Two?	London, England	Sanity (Big Damo and Axel Tischer) (c) defeated Lykos Gym (Kid Lykos and Kid Lykos II) to retain the PROGRESS Tag Team Championship	
21	AEW	Dynasty	St. Louis, Missouri	Swerve Strickland defeated Samoa Joe (c) to win the AEW World Championship	
23	WWE: NXT	Spring Breakin'; Week 1	Orlando, Florida	Trick Williams defeated Ilja Dragunov (c) to win the NXT Championship	Aired as a special episode of NXT.
26	Prestige; PrideStyle	Pride and Prestige	Las Vegas, Nevada	Papa Jace (c) defeated Sonico to retain the PrideStyle Championship	
27	Stardom	All Star Grand Queendom	Yokohama, Japan	Maika (c) defeated Momo Watanabe in a two-out-of-three falls match to retain the World of Stardom Championship	
27	AAA	Triplemanía XXXII: Monterrey	Monterrey, Mexico	Pagano, El Mesías and Vampiro defeated La Secta (Cibernético, Dark Ozz, and Dark Cuervo)	
29	NJPW	Wrestling Satsuma no Kuni	Kagoshima, Japan	Sho (c) defeated Douki to retain the IWGP Junior Heavyweight Championship	
30	WWE: NXT	Spring Breakin'; Week 2	Orlando, Florida	Lola Vice defeated Natalya in a NXT Underground match	Aired as a special episode of NXT.
(c) – denotes defending champion(s)

=== May ===
Date	Promotion(s)	Event	Location	Main Event	Notes
3	TNA	Under Siege	Albany, New York	The System (Moose, Brian Myers and Eddie Edwards) defeated "Broken" Matt Hardy and Speedball Mountain (Trent Seven and Mike Bailey)	
3	GCW	Rather You Than Me	Tampa, Florida	Blake Christian (c) defeated Danhausen to retain the GCW World Championship	
3	NJPW	Wrestling Dontaku	Fukuoka, Japan	Nic Nemeth (c) defeated Hiroshi Tanahashi to retain the IWGP Global Heavyweight Championship	
4	NJPW	Wrestling Dontaku	Fukuoka, Japan	Jon Moxley (c) defeated Ren Narita to retain the IWGP World Heavyweight Championship	
4	CF: Noah	Noah Wrestle Magic	Tokyo, Japan	Kaito Kiyomiya defeated El Hijo de Dr. Wagner Jr. (c) to win the GHC Heavyweight Championship	
4	WWE: Raw; SmackDown	Backlash France	Décines-Charpieu, Metropolis of Lyon, France	Cody Rhodes (c) defeated AJ Styles to retain the Undisputed WWE Championship	WWE's first PPV and live-streaming event to be held in France.
5	GCW	Gringo Loco's The Wrld on Lucha	Jersey City, New Jersey	Los Desperados (Arez and Gringo Loco) defeated Aramis and Jack Cartwheel	
5	HOG	Cinco De Mayo	New York City, New York	Penta El Zero Miedo defeated Laredo Kid	
6	UJPW: NJPW; Stardom; DG; BJW; DDT; Noah	All Together: United Japan Pro-Wrestling Inauguration & Noto Earthquake Benefit Event	Tokyo, Japan	Shota Umino, Kaito Kiyomiya, and Yuki Ueno defeated Yuya Uemura, Konosuke Takeshita, and Shun Skywalker	First event under the UJPW banner. Benefits those affected by the 2024 Noto earthquake.
6	CF: TJPW	Yes! Wonderland 2024	Tokyo, Japan	Miu Watanabe (c) defeated Shoko Nakajima to retain the Princess of Princess Championship	
10	DEFY	Here and Now!	Seattle, Washington	Kenta (c) defeated Bryan Keith to retain the DEFY World Championship	
11	MLW	Azteca Lucha	Cicero, Illinois	Místico (c) defeated Bárbaro Cavernario to retain the MLW World Middleweight Championship	
11	MLW	Fury Road	Cicero, Illinois	Satoshi Kojima (c) defeated 1 Called Manders to retain the MLW World Heavyweight Championship	Aired on tape delay on May 18.
11	NJPW	Resurgence	Ontario, California	Jon Moxley (c) defeated Shota Umino to retain the IWGP World Heavyweight Championship	
16	Prestige	Alive Or Just Breathing	Los Angeles, California	Shelton Benjamin defeated Tom Lawlor	
17	REVOLVER	Another Friday	Dayton, Ohio	Atticus Cogar defeated Alex Colon in a Skewers and Staples Deathmatch	
17	NJPW	Tamashii	Sydney, Australia	Bishamon (Hirooki Goto and Yoshi-Hashi) defeated The Rogue Army (Bad Luck Fale and Caveman Ugg)	
18	NJPW	Tamashii	Melbourne, Australia	Bishamon (Hirooki Goto and Yoshi-Hashi) defeated The Natural Classics (Stevie Filip and Tome Filip)	
18	Stardom	Flashing Champions	Yokohama, Japan	Saori Anou (c) defeated Ami Sohrei to retain the Wonder of Stardom Championship	
18	GCW	Most Notorious	Philadelphia, Pennsylvania	Nick Gage defeated Tony Deppen in a Hardcore match	
18	GWF	Light Heavyweight World Cup '24	Berlin, Germany	Ahura defeated Aigle Blanc, Tim Stübing, and Peter Tihanyi in the Light Heavyweight World Cup final	
18	NWA	Crockett Cup	Forney, Texas	The Southern 6 (Kerry Morton and Alex Taylor) defeated The Immortals (Kratos and Odinson) in the 2024 Crockett Cup finals	Taping for NWA Powerrr.
19	RevPro; CMLL	Fantastica Mania UK	London, England	Gabe Kidd, Magnus and Templario defeated JJ Gale, Místico and Ricky Knight Jr.	Held between two shows.
19	RevPro; CMLL	Fantastica Mania UK	London, England	Michael Oku (c) defeated Último Guerrero to retain the Undisputed British Heavyweight Championship	Held between two shows.
19	DPW	Limit Break	Durham, North Carolina	Calvin Tankman (c) defeated Kevin Ku to retain the DPW Worlds Championship	Aired on tape delay on May 25.
20	Marigold	Fields Forever	Tokyo, Japan	Sareee and Bozilla defeated Giulia and Utami Hayashishita	First event held by Dream Star Fighting Marigold.
23	Independent	Hana Kimura Memorial Show 4	Tokyo, Japan	Utami Hayashishita defeated Veny	
24	HOG	The War Within	New York City, New York	Mike Santana (c) defeated Matt Riddle to retain the HOG World Heavyweight Championship	
25	HOG	The Glory of War	Lowell, Massachusetts	Mustafa Ali defeated Alec Price	
25	WWE: Raw; SmackDown	King and Queen of the Ring	Jeddah, Saudi Arabia	Cody Rhodes (c) defeated Logan Paul to retain the Undisputed WWE Championship	Featured the finals of the 23rd King of the Ring tournament and the second Queen of the Ring tournament. First King of the Ring livestreaming event since 2015 and the first to air on traditional pay-per-view since 2002.
25	GCW	Take A Picture	Chicago, Illinois	Dralístico defeated Gringo Loco	
26	GCW	Paranoid	Columbus, Ohio	Mance Warner vs. Alec Price ended in a no contest	
26	AEW	Double or Nothing	Paradise, Nevada	The Elite (Matthew Jackson, Nicholas Jackson, Kazuchika Okada, and Jack Perry) defeated Team AEW (Darby Allin, Bryan Danielson, Dax Harwood, and Cash Wheeler) in an Anarchy in the Arena match	Featured a triple main event: The Anarchy in the Arena match, the AEW World Championship match between Swerve Strickland (c) and Christian Cage, and the AEW TBS Championship match between Willow Nightingale (c) and Mercedes Moné. Featured the returns of MJF and Juice Robinson, and an appearance by Gangrel.
26	CF: DDT	King of DDT: 20th Anniversary (Finals)	Tokyo, Japan	Mao defeated Daisuke Sasaki in the finals of the King of DDT Tournament	
26	Progress	Super Strong Style 16	London, England	Kid Lykos (c) defeated Mark Haskins to retain the PROGRESS World Championship	
27	Progress	Super Strong Style 16	London, England	Luke Jacobs defeated Ricky Knight Jr. in the 2024 Super Strong Style 16 Tournament Final	
29	CF: Noah	Limit Break 2	Tokyo, Japan	Akitoshi Saito (c) vs. Go Shiozaki for the Zero1 World Heavyweight Championship ended in a time-limit draw	
(c) – denotes defending champion(s)

=== June ===
Date	Promotion(s)	Event	Location	Main Event	Notes
1	MLW	Battle Riot VI	Atlanta, Georgia	Matt Riddle won a 40-man Battle Riot match by last eliminating Sami Callihan to earn a future MLW World Heavyweight Championship match	Featured the MLW in-ring debuts of actor Paul Walter Hauser and YouTuber Chris Danger; and appearances by former WWE talent Mark Henry and Teddy Long.
1	MLW	MLW Anniversary '24	Atlanta, Georgia	Mads Krule Krügger defeated 1 Called Manders in a Bullrope match	Aired on tape delay on June 22.
1	NWA	Back to the Territories	Knoxville, Tennessee	EC3 (c) defeated Colby Corino to retain the NWA Worlds Heavyweight Championship	Taping for NWA Powerrr. Featured the return of the NWA Mid-America Heavyweight Championship.
1	GCW	Tournament of Survival 9	Atlantic City, New Jersey	John Wayne Murdoch defeated Yuki Ishikawa in a Deathmatch in the Tournament of Survival final	
2	GCW	Cage of Survival 3	Atlantic City, New Jersey	Mance Warner defeated Joey Janela (c) to win the GCW World Championship	
2	GWF	Rising Heat	Berlin, Germany	Mike D Vecchio (c) defeated Erkan Sulcani to retain the GWF World Championship	
7	Prestige	Prestige Alive III	Portland, Oregon	Alan Angels (c) defeated Drexl in a Devil's Playground match to retain the Prestige World Championship	
8	HOG	Mike Santana Presents Puerto Rican Weekend	New York City, New York	Mike Santana (c) defeated Amazing Red in a No Disqualification match to retain the HOG Heavyweight Championship	
9	NJPW	Dominion 6.9 in Osaka-jo Hall	Osaka, Japan	El Desperado defeated Taiji Ishimori in the Best of the Super Juniors 31 final	Featured the finals of the Best of the Super Juniors tournament.
9	CF: TJPW	PRISM '24	Tokyo, Japan	Miu Watanabe (c) defeated VertVixen to retain the Princess of Princess Championship	
9	WWE: NXT	Battleground	Enterprise, Nevada	Trick Williams (c) defeated Ethan Page to retain the NXT Championship	Featured the crowning of the inaugural NXT Women's North American Champion.
10	NJPW	Despe Invitacional	Tokyo, Japan	Bullet Club (Dick Togo and Gedo) defeated Danshoku Dino and El Desperado	
14	TNA	Against All Odds	Cicero, Illinois	Moose (c) defeated "Broken" Matt Hardy in a Broken Rules match to retain the TNA World Championship	Featured the return of Jeff Hardy and the debut of NXT superstar Tatum Paxley.
14	GCW	Lights Out	Golden, Colorado	Nick Gage defeated Orin Veidt in a Deathmatch	
15	GCW	Hit 'Em Up	Los Angeles, California	Mance Warner (c) vs. Joey Janela for the GCW World Championship ended in a no contest	
15	AAA	Triplemanía XXXII: Tijuana	Tijuana, Mexico	Team USA (Q.T. Marshall, Sam Adonis, Parker Boudreaux and Satnam Singh) defeated Vampiro, Alberto El Patrón and Los Psycho Circus (Dave The Clown and Murder Clown)	
15	UJPW: NJPW; NOAH; DDT; BJW; Stardom	All Together Sapporo	Sapporo, Japan	Tetsuya Naito defeated Jake Lee	Benefits those affected by the 2024 Noto earthquake.
15	WWE: Raw; SmackDown	Clash at the Castle: Scotland	Glasgow, Scotland	Damian Priest (c) defeated Drew McIntyre to retain the World Heavyweight Championship	First WWE PPV and livestreaming event to be held in Scotland.
15	All Elite Wrestling	Collision's 1 Year Anniversary	Youngstown, Ohio	House of Black (Brody King, Buddy Matthews and Malakai Black) defeated Bang Bang Gang (Austin Gunn, Colten Gunn and Juice Robinson)	
16	CF: Noah	Grand Ship in Yokohama	Yokohama, Japan	Kaito Kiyomiya (c) defeated Gabe Kidd to retain the GHC Heavyweight Championship	
16	GCW	I Can't Feel My Face	Mesa, Arizona	Joey Janela defeated ."Broski" Jimmy Lloyd	
16	DPW	Live 6	Chicago, Illinois	Calvin Tankman (c) defeated Alex Shelley to retain the DPW Worlds Championship	
21	NJPW; CMLL	Fantastica Mania Mexico	Mexico City, Mexico	Místico defeated Hiromu Takahashi	Celebrated the 20-year anniversary of Místico.
21	Stardom	New Blood 13	Tokyo, Japan	wing★gori (Hanan and Saya Iida) (c) defeated Cosmic Angels (Sakura Aya and Kurara Sayaka) to retain the New Blood Tag Team Championship	
22	Stardom	The Conversion	Tokyo, Japan	Maika (c) defeated Xena to retain the World of Stardom Championship	
22	REVOLVER	Cage of Horrors 3	Clive, Iowa	Mance Warner defeated 1 Called Manders and Matthew Justice in a Cage of Horrors match	
22	Independent	Josh Barnett's Bloodsport Bushido	Tokyo, Japan	Jon Moxley defeated Josh Barnett by knockout	
28	GCW	No Sleep	Houston, Texas	Zilla Fatu defeated John Wayne Murdoch in a Houston Street Fight	
29	GCW	Crime Wave	Dallas, Texas	1 Called Manders and Dante León defeated Mance Warner and "Broski" Jimmy Lloyd	
29	RevPro	Raw Deal	Stevenage, England	Michael Oku (c) defeated Anthony Ogogo to retain the Undisputed British Heavyweight Championship	
30	AEW; NJPW	Forbidden Door	Elmont, New York	Swerve Strickland (c) defeated Will Ospreay to retain the AEW World Championship	
(c) – denotes defending champion(s)

=== July ===
Date	Promotion(s)	Event	Location	Main Event	Notes
3	AEW	Beach Break	Chicago, Illinois	Will Ospreay (c) defeated Daniel Garcia to retain the AEW International Championship	Aired as a special episode of AEW Dynamite.
3	AEW	Beach Break	Chicago, Illinois	Mariah May defeated Hikaru Shida in a Women's Owen Hart Cup Tournament semifinal match	Aired on tape delay on July 5 as a special episode of AEW Rampage.
5	GCW	Worst Behavior	Toronto, Ontario, Canada	Blake Christian vs. Mance Warner ended in a no contest in a Hardcore match	
6	DPW	Live 7	Raleigh, North Carolina	Speedball x Something (Mike Bailey and Jake Something) (c) defeated Calvin Tankman and Titus Alexander to retain the DPW Worlds Tag Team Championship	
6	WWE: Raw; SmackDown	Money in the Bank	Toronto, Ontario, Canada	The Bloodline (Solo Sikoa, Tama Tonga, and Jacob Fatu) defeated Cody Rhodes, Kevin Owens, and Randy Orton	First Money in the Bank event to take place in Canada.
7	WWE: NXT	Heatwave	Toronto, Ontario, Canada	Ethan Page defeated Trick Williams (c), Je'Von Evans, and Shawn Spears to win the NXT Championship	First major NXT event in Canada in five years.
7	GCW; IWS	Scarred 4 Life	Montreal, Quebec, Canada	PCP Manny defeated Joey Janela in a Deathmatch	
7	DPW	Tag Festival	Raleigh, North Carolina	Violence Is Forever (Dominic Garrini and Kevin Ku) defeated Miracle Generation (Dustin Waller and Kylon King), MxM (Mason Madden and Mansoor), and Grizzled Young Veterans (James Drake and Zack Gibson) in a Four-way tag team elimination match in the Tag Festival tournament final	Aired on tape delay on July 13.
12	MLW	Blood & Thunder	St. Petersburg, Florida	Matt Riddle defeated Sami Callihan in a No Ropes Deathmatch to retain his MLW World Heavyweight Championship opportunity	
12	MLW	Never Say Never	St. Petersburg, Florida	Contra Unit (Mads Krule Krügger, Minoru Suzuki, and Ikuro Kwon) defeated Satoshi Kojima, Matt Riddle, and Akira	Aired on tape delay on August 10.
12	Prestige	Combat Clash PDX	Portland, Oregon	Alan Angels (c) defeated Evil Uno in a Street Fight to retain the Prestige World Championship	
13	Marigold	Summer Destiny	Ryōgoku, Japan	Sareee defeated Giulia to become the inaugural Marigold World Champion	Also featured WWE superstar Iyo Sky.
13	CF: Noah	Destination	Tokyo, Japan	Kaito Kiyomiya (c) defeated Yoichi to retain the GHC Heavyweight Championship	Also featured WWE superstar AJ Styles.
13	NJPW; CMLL	Fantastica Mania USA	San Jose, California	Douki and Místico defeated Rocky Romero and Volador Jr.	
14	GWF	Summer Smash 9	Berlin, Germany	Moose defeated Mike D Vecchio (c) by disqualification for the GWF World Championship	
17	AEW	Dynamite 250	Little Rock, Arkansas	Swerve Strickland defeated Kazuchika Okada by disqualification	Celebrated the 250th episode of AEW Dynamite.
18	GCW	Believe Me	Louisville, Kentucky	Mance Warner (c) defeated Myron Reed to retain the GCW World Championship	
19	DEFY	For the Glory	Seattle, Washington	Artemis Spencer defeated Mark Haskins	
19	GCW	So High	Sauget, Illinois	Mance Warner (c) defeated "Hoodfoot" Mo Atlas to retain the GCW World Championship	Featured an appearance by former WWE superstar Raj Dhesi.
20	GCW	Don't Tell Me What To Do	Indianapolis, Indiana	Mance Warner (c) defeated Megan Bayne to retain the GCW World Championship	
20	TNA	Slammiversary	Montreal, Quebec, Canada	Nic Nemeth defeated Moose (c), Josh Alexander, Steve Maclin, Frankie Kazarian and Joe Hendry in a six-way elimination match to win the TNA World Championship	
20	West Coast Pro; DPW; Prestige	Untouchable	San Francisco, California	Shelton Benjamin defeated Titus Alexander	
20	CF: TJPW	Summer Sun Princess	Tokyo, Japan	Miu Watanabe (c) defeated Rika Tatsumi to retain the Princess of Princess Championship	
21	CF: DDT	Wrestle Peter Pan	Tokyo, Japan	Yuki Ueno (c) defeated Mao to retain the KO-D Openweight Championship	
24	AEW	Blood & Guts	Nashville, Tennessee	Team AEW (Swerve Strickland, Mark Briscoe, Darby Allin, Max Caster, and Anthony Bowens) defeated Team Elite (Matthew Jackson, Nicholas Jackson, Kazuchika Okada, Jack Perry, and "Hangman" Adam Page) by surrender in a Blood and Guts match	Aired as a special episode of AEW Dynamite.
24	AEW	Royal Rampage	Nashville, Tennessee	The Don Callis Family (Kyle Fletcher and Rush) defeated The Outrunners (Turbo Floyd and Truth Magnum), The Righteous (Vincent and Dutch), and Private Party ("Brother Zay" Isiah Kassidy and Marq Quen)	Aired on tape delay on July 26 as a special episode of AEW Rampage.
26	ROH	Death Before Dishonor	Arlington, Texas	Mark Briscoe (c) defeated Roderick Strong to retain the ROH World Championship	
26	HOG	High Intensity	Jamaica, New York	Swerve Strickland defeated Amazing Red	
27	AEW	Battle of the Belts XI	Arlington, Texas	Dustin Rhodes and The Von Erichs (Marshall Von Erich and Ross Von Erich) defeated The Undisputed Kingdom (Matt Taven, Mike Bennett, and Roderick Strong) to win the vacant ROH World Six-Man Tag Team Championship	Aired immediately after Collision.
27	Stardom	Sapporo World Rendezvous	Sapporo, Japan	Natsupoi defeated Saori Anou (c) to win the Wonder of Stardom Championship	
28	Stardom	Sapporo World Rendezvous	Sapporo, Japan	Natsuko Tora defeated Maika (c) to win the World of Stardom Championship	
28	Progress	Chapter 169: The Devil On My Shoulder	London, England	Luke Jacobs defeated Kid Lykos (c) to win the PROGRESS World Championship	
28	GCW	Josh Barnett's Bloodsport XI	Brooklyn, New York	Shayna Baszler defeated Miyu Yamashita by technical knockout	
30	WWE: NXT	The Great American Bash; Week 1	Orlando, Florida	Roxanne Perez (c) defeated Thea Hail to retain the NXT Women's Championship	Aired as a special episode of NXT.
(c) – denotes defending champion(s)

=== August ===
Date	Promotion(s)	Event	Location	Main Event	Notes
2	AAA	Verano de Escándalo	Aguascalientes, Mexico	Nueva Generación Dinamita (Sansón and Forastero) and Fresero Jr. and La Secta del Mesías (El Mesias, Dark Escoria and Dark Espíritu) defeated Los Psycho Circus (Murder Clown, Dave the Clown and Panic Clown) in a three-way tag team Steel Cage match	
2	GCW	Now and Forever	Cleveland, Ohio	"Broken" Matt Hardy vs. Nick Gage ended in a no contest	
3	WWE: Raw; SmackDown	SummerSlam	Cleveland, Ohio	Cody Rhodes (c) defeated Solo Sikoa in a Bloodline Rules match to retain the Undisputed WWE Championship	
3	NJPW	Academy Showcase #4	Carson, California	Allan Breeze defeated Wicked Wickett	
4	GWF	Showdown	Berlin, Germany	Mike D Vecchio (c) defeated Peter Tihanyi to retain the GWF World Championship	
4	GCW	Can I Trust You?	Asbury Park, New Jersey	Mike Bailey vs. Raj Dhesi ended in a no contest	
6	WWE: NXT	The Great American Bash; Week 2	Orlando, Florida	Axiom and Nathan Frazer (c) defeated MSK (Wes Lee and Zachary Wentz) to retain the NXT Tag Team Championship	Aired as a special episode of NXT.
11	RevPro	Summer Sizzler: Road to The Anniversary	London, England	MJF (c) defeated Michael Oku to retain the AEW American Championship	
12	DDT; GCW	Never Ending Noisy Story	Tokyo, Japan	Mao (c) defeated Alex Zayne to retain the DDT Universal Championship	
13	GCW	The Sky is The Limit	Tokyo, Japan	Mance Warner (c) defeated 1 Called Manders to retain the GCW World Championship	
14	GCW	You Only Die Once	Tokyo, Japan	Mance Warner (c) defeated Takayuki Ueki to retain the GCW World Championship	
16	JCW	Bloodymania 17	Thornville, Ohio	Nick Gage vs. Mad Man Pondo vs. JJ Allin in a three way death match	
17	AAA	Triplemanía XXXII: Mexico City	Mexico City, Mexico	Los Psycho Circus (Murder Clown, Dave the Clown, and Panic Clown) and La Secta Cibernética (Cibernético, Dark Cuervo, and Dark Ozz) defeated Los Vipers (El Fiscal, Abismo Negro Jr., and Psicosis) in a Domo De La Muerte Mask vs. Hair cage match	
17	FSW; HOG	Winner Takes All	Las Vegas, Nevada	Chris Bey (c) defeated Amazing Red to retain the FSW Mecca Grand Championship	
17	GCW	No Signal in The Hills 4	Los Angeles, California	Mance Warner (c) defeated Frankie Kazarian to retain the GCW World Championship	
18	NJPW	G1 Climax 34; Final	Tokyo, Japan	Zack Sabre Jr. defeated Yota Tsuji in the G1 Climax 34 tournament final	
18	GCW	Save Me	Salt Lake City, Utah	Mance Warner (c) defeated Manny Lemons to retain the GCW World Championship	
18	DPW	High Noon	Pasadena, Texas	Speedball x Something (Mike Bailey and Jake Something) (c) defeated ABC (Ace Austin and Chris Bey) to retain the DPW Worlds Tag Team Championship	Aired on tape delay on August 24.
19	Marigold	Summer Gold Shine	Tokyo, Japan	Giulia defeated Mai Sakurai	Featured Giulia's final singles match in Japan.
23	CMLL	Gran Prix Internacional	Mexico City, Mexico	Team International (Claudio Castagnoli, Akira, Davey Boy Smith Jr., Flip Gordon, Ikuro Kwon, Kyle Fletcher, Mansoor, Robbie X, Rocky Romero and Yota Tsuji) defeated Team Mexico (Templario, Místico, Atlantis Jr., Esfinge, Euforia, Máscara Dorada, Titán, Ultimo Guerrero, Valiente and Volador Jr.) in a Grand Prix International Torneo Cibernético match	
24	RevPro	RevPro 12th Anniversary Show	London, England	Luke Jacobs defeated Michael Oku (c) to win the Undisputed British Heavyweight Championship	
24	REVOLVER	Taste of Truth	Dayton, Ohio	Jake Crist defeated Matthew Palmer in a Bare Boards And Bullrope Deathmatch	
24	REVOLVER	Fight Club	Dayton, Ohio	Josh Alexander defeated Simon Gotch by referee stoppage in a Caged Combat match	
24	GCW	Homecoming Weekend	Atlantic City, New Jersey	Mance Warner (c) defeated Joey Janela, Blake Christian and Matt Cardona in a Ladder match to retain the GCW World Championship	Featured an appearance by former WWE wrestler John Layfield.
25	GCW	Homecoming Weekend	Atlantic City, New Jersey	Joey Janela and "Broken" Matt Hardy defeated Deathmatch Royalty (Matt Cardona and "Broski" Jimmy Lloyd)	
25	CF: TJPW	Tokyo Princess Cup 2024 (Finals)	Tokyo, Japan	Ryo Mizunami defeated Yuki Aino to win the Tokyo Princess Cup	
25	AEW	All In	London, England	Bryan Danielson defeated Swerve Strickland (c) in a Title vs. Career match to win the AEW World Championship	
26	Progress	Chapter 170: Wrestling Never Sleeps	London, England	Luke Jacobs (c) defeated Kid Lykos to retain the PROGRESS World Championship	
29	MLW	Summer of the Beasts	Queens, New York	Místico defeated Atlantis Jr. in a 2024 Opera Cup Tournament quarterfinal match	
29	MLW	Summer of the Beasts: Part 2	Queens, New York	Bobby Fish defeated Timothy Thatcher	Aired on tape delay on September 7.
30	NJPW	Capital Collision	Washington, D.C.	Mercedes Moné (c) defeated Momo Watanabe to retain the Strong Women's Championship	
30	GWF; RevPro	Double Impact; Night 1	Berlin, Germany	Mike D Vecchio (c) defeated Ricky Knight Jr. to retain the GWF World Championship	
30	TNA	Emergence	Louisville, Kentucky	Nic Nemeth (c) defeated Josh Alexander 3–2 in a 60-minute Iron Man match to retain the TNA World Championship	
31	Stardom	5 Star Grand Prix; Final	Tokyo, Japan	Maika defeated Saya Kamitani in the Stardom 5Star Grand Prix tournament final	
31	NWA	NWA 76th Anniversary Show	Philadelphia, Pennsylvania	Thom Latimer defeated EC3 (c) to win the NWA Worlds Heavyweight Championship	Taping for NWA Powerrr.
31	GWF; RevPro	Double Impact; Night 2	Berlin, Germany	Luke Jacobs (c) defeated Rambo to retain the Undisputed British Heavyweight Championship	
31	GCW	Live Fast, Die Young	Chicago, Illinois	Mance Warner (c) defeated Gringo Loco in a Deathmatch to retain the GCW World Championship	
31	WWE: Raw; SmackDown	Bash in Berlin	Berlin, Germany	Gunther (c) defeated Randy Orton to retain the World Heavyweight Championship	WWE's first PPV and livestreaming event held in Germany.
(c) – denotes defending champion(s)

=== September ===
Date	Promotion(s)	Event	Location	Main Event	Notes
1	GWF	Battlefield	Berlin, Germany	Peter Tihanyi won the 30-man Battlefield match by last eliminating Erkan Sulcani to earn a future GWF World Championship match	
1	CF: Noah	N-1 Victory; Final	Osaka, Japan	Kaito Kiyomiya (c) defeated Kenoh in the N-1 Victory tournament final to retain the GHC Heavyweight Championship	
1	WWE: NXT	No Mercy	Denver, Colorado	Ethan Page (c) defeated Joe Hendry to retain the NXT Championship	Featured the official WWE debut of Giulia.
5	HOG	Chicago	Chicago, Illinois	Mike Santana (c) defeated Donovan Dijak to retain the HOG Heavyweight Championship	
7	NJPW	Shingo Takagi's 20th Anniversary Event	Kōfu, Japan	Los Ingobernables de Japón (Shingo Takagi and Bushi) and Yamato vs. Los Ingobernables de Japón (Tetsuya Naito, Yota Tsuji, and Hiromu Takahashi) ended in a 30-minute time-limit draw	
7	AEW	All Out	Hoffman Estates, Illinois	"Hangman" Adam Page defeated Swerve Strickland by knockout in a Lights Out Steel Cage match	
8	CF: TJPW	Always Be a Challenger	Nagoya, Japan	Yuki Arai (c) defeated Arisu Endo to retain the International Princess Championship	
13	Stardom	New Blood 14	Nagoya, Japan	Devil Princess (Rina and Azusa Inaba) defeated Cosmic Angels (Aya Sakura and Yuna Mizumori)	
13	TNA	Victory Road	San Antonio, Texas	Nic Nemeth (c) defeated Moose to retain the TNA World Championship	
13	CMLL	CMLL 91st Anniversary Show	Mexico City, Mexico	Místico defeated Chris Jericho 2–1 in a two out of three falls match	
14	Stardom	Namba Grand Fight	Osaka, Japan	Tam Nakano (c) defeated Maika to retain the World of Stardom Championship	
14	CF: Noah	Star Navigation in Tokyo	Tokyo, Japan	Kaito Kiyomiya defeated Ryohei Oiwa	
14	MLW	Fightland	Atlanta, Georgia	Místico defeated Kenta in the Opera Cup final	Featured the final of the Opera Cup.
14	MLW	Pit Fighters	Atlanta, Georgia	Matt Riddle defeated Tom Lawlor in a Vale Tudo Rules match	Aired on tape delay on September 26.
14	GCW	Bad One	Detroit, Michigan	Bad Boyhausen (Danhausen and Joey Janela) defeated Deathmatch Royalty (Mance Warner and "Broski" Jimmy Lloyd)	
15	GCW	Tha G-Code	Rochester, New York	Effy, Megan Bayne, and 1 Called Manders defeated Deathmatch Royalty (Matt Cardona, "Broski" Jimmy Lloyd and Mance Warner)	
15	DPW	Carolina Classic	Durham, North Carolina	Jake Something defeated LaBron Kozone, Luke Jacobs and Mike Bailey in a Four-way elimination match in the Carolina Classic tournament final	Aired on tape delay on September 22.
20	DEFY	By Design	Seattle, Washington	Kenta (c) defeated Artemis Spencer to retain the DEFY World Championship	Aired on tape delay on October 7.
20	GCW	Aura	Philadelphia, Pennsylvania	Matt Tremont defeated Slade in a Hardcore match	
21	GCW	Back to Back	Hartford, Connecticut	Brandon Kirk defeated Matt Tremont in a Deathmatch	
21	REVOLVER	Tales from The Ring 7	Clive, Iowa	Krule defeated Rickey Shane Page, Atticus Cogar, and Crash Jaxon in a Monster's Brawl match	
22	Progress	Chapter 171: History is Written by The Victors	London, England	Luke Jacobs (c) defeated Eddie Dennis to retain the PROGRESS World Championship	
22	CF: TJPW	Wrestle Princess V	Chiba, Japan	Miu Watanabe (c) defeated Ryo Mizunami to retain the Princess of Princess Championship	
25	AEW	Grand Slam	Queens, New York	Jon Moxley defeated Darby Allin to win Allin's AEW World Championship opportunity	Aired as a special episode of AEW Dynamite.
25	AEW	Grand Slam	Queens, New York	Kazuchika Okada (c) defeated Sammy Guevara in an AEW Continental Championship Eliminator match	Aired on tape delay on September 28 as a special episode of AEW Collision.
27	CMLL	Noche De Campeones	Mexico City, Mexico	Rayo Metálico defeated Futuro (c) to win the Mexican National Lightweight Championship	
28	Marigold	Dream Star Grand Prix; Final	Tokyo, Japan	Utami Hayashishita defeated Mai Sakurai in the Dream Star Grand Prix tournament final	
28	RevPro	British J-Cup	Stevenage, England	Lio Rush defeated Cameron Khai, Dante Martin and Kid Lykos II in the 2024 British J-Cup tournament final	
29	NJPW	Destruction in Kobe	Kobe, Japan	Tetsuya Naito (c) defeated Great-O-Khan to retain the IWGP World Heavyweight Championship	
29	Stardom	New Blood 15	Tokorozawa, Japan	Rina (c) defeated Aya Sakura to retain the Future of Stardom Championship	
29	CF: DDT	Dramatic Infinity	Tokyo, Japan	The37Kamiina (Mao and Yuki Ueno) and Kaisei Takechi defeated Schadenfreude International (Chris Brookes, Masahiro Takanashi and Takeshi Masada)	
29	HOG	Believe in The Glory	New York City, New York	Jay Lethal and Mike Santana defeated The Cold Blooded Killers (Charles Mason and Nolo Kitano) (c) by disqualification for the HOG Tag Team Championship	Aired on tape delay on October 9.
29	West Coast Pro; DPW; Prestige	Roseland 9	Portland, Oregon	Mustafa Ali defeated Alan Angels (c) by disqualification for the Prestige World Championship	
(c) – denotes defending champion(s)

=== October ===
Date	Promotion(s)	Event	Location	Main Event	Notes
1	WWE: NXT	CW Network Premiere; Week 1	Rosemont, Illinois	Trick Williams defeated Ethan Page (c) to win the NXT Championship, with CM Punk as the special guest referee	Aired as a special episode of NXT. Featured appearances Jade Cargill and Bianca Belair, and a special MizTV episode hosted by The Miz.
2	AEW	Dynamite's 5 Year Anniversary	Pittsburgh, Pennsylvania	Bryan Danielson (c) defeated Kazuchika Okada to retain the AEW World Championship; Okada's AEW Continental Championship was also on the line for the first 20 minutes	Aired as a special episode of AEW Dynamite.
5	Stardom	Nagoya Golden Fight	Nagoya, Japan	Tam Nakano (c) defeated Suzu Suzuki to retain the World of Stardom Championship	
5	WWE: Raw; SmackDown	Bad Blood	Atlanta, Georgia	Cody Rhodes and Roman Reigns defeated The Bloodline (Solo Sikoa and Jacob Fatu)	First Bad Blood event since 2004.
5	Noah; DEFY; Progress	Progress x Noah x DEFY	Oberhausen, Germany	Luke Jacobs (c) defeated Timothy Thatcher to retain the PROGRESS World Championship	First Noah and DEFY event that take place in Germany.
6	GWF	Blockbuster 4	Berlin, Germany	Toni Harting (c) defeated Man Like DeReiss to retain the GWF World Championship	
6	CF: TJPW	All Rise	Tokyo, Japan	Meiko Satomura and Shoko Nakajima defeated Miu Watanabe and Miyu Yamashita	
6	NJPW	Wrestling Life 40th Anniversary Yuji Nagata Produce Blue Justice XIV	Togane, Japan	Jun Akiyama and Yuji Nagata defeated Team NOAH (Atsushi Kotoge and Go Shiozaki)	
6	AAA	Héroes Inmortales XVI	Zapopan, Jalisco, Mexico	Alberto El Patrón (c) defeated Laredo Kid to retain the AAA Mega Championship	
7	Marigold	Fantastic Adventure; Night 1	Tokyo, Japan	MiraiSaku (Mirai and Mai Sakurai) (c) defeated tWin toWer (Kouki Amarei and Chika Goto) to retain the Marigold Twin Star Championship	
8	WWE: NXT	CW Network Premiere; Week 2	Chesterfield, Missouri	Randy Orton defeated Je'Von Evans	Aired as a special episode of NXT. Featured appearances from Jey Uso and Sexyy Red.
8	AEW	Title Tuesday	Spokane, Washington	Bryan Danielson and Wheeler Yuta defeated Blackpool Combat Club (Claudio Castagnoli and Pac)	
12	AEW	WrestleDream	Tacoma, Washington	Jon Moxley defeated Bryan Danielson (c) to win the AEW World Championship	
12	REVOLVER	Epic Over Texas	Grand Prairie, Texas	Mike Bailey and Paul Walter Hauser defeated The Crew (Matthew Palmer and Rich Swann)	
12	GCW	Fight Club; Night 1: The Art of War Games	Atlantic City, New Jersey	Deathmatch Royalty (Matt Cardona, Broski Jimmy and Mance Warner) and Bully Ray defeated Team GCW (Joey Janela, 1 Called Manders, Effy, and Matthew Justice) in the Art of WarGames match	
13	GCW	Fight Club; Night 2	Atlantic City, New Jersey	Ciclope defeated Matt Tremont in a Deathmatch	
13	DPW	Super Battle	Charlotte, North Carolina	Jake Something defeated Calvin Tankman (c) to win DPW Worlds Championship	Aired on tape delay on October 19.
14	NJPW	King of Pro-Wrestling	Tokyo, Japan	Zack Sabre Jr. defeated Tetsuya Naito (c) to win the IWGP World Heavyweight Championship	
14	CF: Noah	Star Navigation Premium: Akitoshi Saito Road Last	Tokyo, Japan	Kaito Kiyomiya (c) defeated Masa Kitamiya to retain the GHC Heavyweight Championship	
17	AEW	Battle of the Belts XII	Stockton, California	Anna Jay defeated Mariah May (c) in an AEW Women's World Championship Eliminator match	Aired on tape delay on October 19.
18	HOG	Salvation	New York City, New York	Mike Santana (c) defeated Masato Tanaka to retain the HOG Heavyweight Championship	
18	GCW	War Ready	Denver, Colorado	Dr. Redacted defeated Orin Veidt in a Deathmatch	
19	GCW	Blood on The Hills 3	Los Angeles, California	Ciclope vs. Rina Yamashita ended in a no contest in a Deathmatch	
19	RevPro	Global Wars UK	Doncaster, England	Luke Jacobs (c) defeated Tomohiro Ishii to retain the Undisputed British Heavyweight Championship	
19	Stardom	New Blood 16	Tokyo, Japan	Devil Princess (Rina and Azusa Inaba) (c) defeated Rice Or Bread (Waka Tsukiyama and Hanako) to retain the New Blood Tag Team Championship	
19	REVOLVER	Bad Trip	Dayton, Ohio	RED (Alex Colon, Dark Pledge, and Rickey Shane Page) defeated Akira, Judge Joe Dred, and KC Jacobs in a Beer Garden Deathmatch	
19	MLP	Forged in Excellence	Windsor, Ontario, Canada	Konosuke Takeshita defeated Mike Bailey	
20	MLP	Forged in Excellence	Windsor, Ontario, Canada	Konosuke Takeshita (c) defeated Josh Alexander to retain the AEW International Championship	
20	CF: DDT	God Bless DDT	Tokyo, Japan	Shinya Aoki (c) defeated Harashima to retain the KO-D Openweight Championship	
20	CF: DDT	God Bless DDT	Tokyo, Japan	Shinya Aoki (c) defeated Shunma Katsumata to retain the KO-D Openweight Championship	
20	NJPW	Royal Quest IV	London, England	Zack Sabre Jr. (c) defeated Sanada to retain the IWGP World Heavyweight Championship	
24	Marigold	Fantastic Adventure; Night 2	Tokyo, Japan	Sareee (c) defeated Bozilla to retain the Marigold World Championship	
26	NWA	Samhain 2	Tampa, Florida	Thom Latimer (c) vs. EC3 for the NWA Worlds Heavyweight Championship ended in a no contest	Taping for NWA Powerrr.
26	TNA	Bound for Glory	Detroit, Michigan	The Hardys (Matt Hardy and Jeff Hardy) defeated The System (Brian Myers and Eddie Edwards) (c) and ABC (Ace Austin and Chris Bey) in a Three-way Full Metal Mayhem match to win the TNA World Tag Team Championship	
27	Progress	Chapter 172: Werewolves of London	London, England	Rhio (c) defeated Lizzy Evo to retain the Progress World Women's Championship	
27	WWE: NXT	Halloween Havoc	Hershey, Pennsylvania	Trick Williams (c) defeated Ethan Page in a Devil's Playground match to retain the NXT Championship	
30	AEW	Fright Night Dynamite	Cleveland, Ohio	Swerve Strickland defeated Shelton Benjamin	Aired as a special episode of AEW Dynamite. Featured the AEW debut of Bobby Lashley.
30	JCW	Devil's Night	Detroit, Michigan	Willie Mack defeated Matt Cross (c) and Mecha Wolf to win the JCW Heavyweight Championship	JCW's first pay-per-view event since 2013
31	JCW	Hallowicked	Detroit, Michigan	Matt Cross and Willie Mack defeated Jesús Rodríguez and Mecha Wolf	Aired as a live special broadcast of JCW Lunacy
31	GCW	Monster Bash	National City, California	Ciclope defeated Arez	
(c) – denotes defending champion(s)

=== November ===
Date	Promotion(s)	Event	Location	Main Event	Notes
2	GCW	HawaiiMania	Honolulu, Hawaii	Aleki Afi defeated Matt Cardona	First GCW event that took place in Hawaii.
2	WWE: Raw; SmackDown	Crown Jewel	Riyadh, Saudi Arabia	Cody Rhodes (Undisputed) defeated Gunther (World) in a Champion vs. Champion match to win the inaugural WWE Crown Jewel Championship	
3	GWF	Legacy: 29 Jahre Berlin Wrestling	Berlin, Germany	Peter Tihanyi defeated Toni Harting (c) to win the GWF World Championship	Celebrated 29 years of the German Wrestling Federation.
4	NJPW	Power Struggle	Osaka, Japan	Zack Sabre Jr. (c) defeated Shingo Takagi to retain the IWGP World Heavyweight Championship	Featured the finals of the Super Junior Tag League.
6	WWE: NXT	NXT 2300	Philadelphia, Pennsylvania	Giulia, Jordynne Grace, Kelani Jordan, Stephanie Vaquer, and Zaria defeated Fatal Influence (Fallon Henley, Jacy Jayne, and Jazmyn Nyx), Cora Jade, and Roxanne Perez	WWE's television debut in the 2300 Arena. Aired on Wednesday night as a special episode of NXT.
8	NJPW	Fighting Spirit Unleashed	Lowell, Massachusetts	Gabe Kidd (c) defeated Kosei Fujita to retain the Strong Openweight Championship	
9	MLW; CMLL	Lucha Apocalypto	Cicero, Illinois	Místico (c) defeated Titán and Averno in a three-way match to retain the MLW World Middleweight Championship	Aired on tape delay on November 10.
9	MLW	Slaughterhouse	Cicero, Illinois	Mads Krule Krügger defeated Akira in a Weapons of Mass Destruction match	Aired on tape delay on November 23.
9	CF: TJPW	Bright Eyes	Seattle, Washington	121000000 (Maki Itoh and Miyu Yamashita) (c) defeated Nicole Matthews and Vert Vixen to retain the Princess Tag Team Championship	
9	DEFY; CF: DDT	DDT in Utero	Seattle, Washington	Miyu Yamashita defeated Mao (c) and Mike Bailey in a three-way match to win the DDT Universal Championship	
10	DEFY; CF: DDT; TJPW	Trianger DTD	Seattle, Washington	Sinner and Saint (Judas Icarus and Travis Williams) defeated Moonlight Express (Mao and Mike Bailey)	
10	AAA	Guerra de Titanes	Ciudad Juárez, Chihuahua, Mexico	Alberto El Patrón (c) defeated Pagano to retain the AAA Mega Championship	Featured Vampiro's retirement match.
12	NJPW	Superhuman Taiji Ishimori Gets Ridiculous	Tokyo, Japan	Taiji Ishimori defeated Dragon Dia	
14	Marigold	Winter Wonderful Fight; Night 1	Tokyo, Japan	Sareee defeated Nao Ishikawa	
14	GCW	Chaos in Kentucky	Louisville, Kentucky	Mance Warner (c) defeated 2 Tuff Tony to retain the GCW World Championship	
15	GCW	Gateway to the Death 2	Sauget, Illinois	Mance Warner (c) defeated Ciclope in a Deathmatch to retain the GCW World Championship	
16	GCW	Nick Gage Invitational 9	Orlando, Florida	Sawyer Wreck defeated Brandon Kirk (c) in the Nick Gage Invitational final to win the GCW Ultraviolent Championship	
16	Stardom	New Blood West 2	Osaka, Japan	Devil Princess (Rina and Azusa Inaba) (c) defeated God's Eye (Lady C and Ranna Yagami) to retain the New Blood Tag Team Championship	
16	CF: TJPW	The Mountain Top	Osaka, Japan	Miu Watanabe (c) defeated Zara Zakher to retain the Princess of Princess Championship	
17	NJPW; Stardom	Historic X-Over 2	Osaka, Japan	Zack Sabre Jr. and Maika defeated El Desperado and Starlight Kid	
17	CF: Noah	Deathnity	Nagoya, Japan	Kaito Kiyomiya (c) defeated Takashi Sugiura to retain the GHC Heavyweight Championship	Featured Akitoshi Saito's retirement match.
17	Progress	Chapter 173: Stay Young & Invincible	Manchester, England	Boisterous Behaviour (Leon Slater and Man Like DeReiss) defeated Young Guns (Ethan Allen and Luke Jacobs)	
17	DPW	World's Strongest	Jersey City, New Jersey	Jake Something (c) defeated Donovan Dijak to retain DPW Worlds Championship	Aired on tape delay on November 24.
23	AEW	Full Gear	Newark, New Jersey	Jon Moxley (c) defeated Orange Cassidy to retain the AEW World Championship	
23	GCW	Dream On	East Rutherford, New Jersey	Mance Warner (c) vs. Effy for the GCW World Championship ended in a no contest	Featured appearances by Ricky Starks, and WWE Hall of Famers Kurt Angle, Mick Foley, and John Layfield.
24	GCW	Josh Barnett's Bloodsport XII	Jersey City, New Jersey	Josh Barnett defeated MVP by submission	
24	Progress	Chapter 174: Vendetta 2	London, England	Luke Jacobs (c) defeated Leon Slater to retain the PROGRESS World Championship	
27	AEW	Thanksgiving Eve Dynamite	Chicago, Illinois	Brody King defeated Darby Allin in a Continental Classic Gold League match	Aired as a special episode of AEW Dynamite.
29	TNA	Turning Point	Winston-Salem, North Carolina	Nic Nemeth (c) defeated Eddie Edwards to retain the TNA World Championship	
29	GCW	You Wouldn't Understand	New York City, New York	Mance Warner (c) defeated Homicide to retain the GCW World Championship	
29	DEFY; Progress	Onslaught; Night 1	New York City, New York	Luke Jacobs (c) defeated Kevin Knight to retain the PROGRESS World Championship	
30	WWE: Raw; SmackDown	Survivor Series: WarGames	Vancouver, British Columbia, Canada	Roman Reigns, The Usos (Jey Uso and Jimmy Uso), Sami Zayn, and CM Punk defeated The Bloodline (Solo Sikoa, Jacob Fatu, Tama Tonga, and Tonga Loa) and Bronson Reed in a WarGames match	This was the first WWE PPV event in Vancouver in 26 years, and subsequently the first livestreaming event there as well.
30	JCW	Spanks Givin'	Wyandotte, Michigan	The Southern Six (Alex Taylor, Kerry Morton, and Silas Mason) defeated Matt Cross, Mickie Knuckles, and Willie Mack in a six man tag team match	
(c) – denotes defending champion(s)

=== December ===
Date	Promotion(s)	Event	Location	Main Event	Notes
1	GCW	Say You Will	Chicago, Illinois	Mance Warner (c) defeated Kylie Rae to retain the GCW World Championship	
1	DEFY; Progress	Onslaught; Night 2	Chicago, Illinois	Luke Jacobs (c) defeated Man Like DeReiss to retain the PROGRESS World Championship	
1	GWF	Final Countdown	Berlin, Germany	Peter Tihanyi (c) defeated Metehan to retain the GWF World Championship	
1	CF: TJPW	11th Birthday Show	Tokyo, Japan	121000000 (Maki Itoh and Miyu Yamashita) (c) defeated Haru Kazashiro and Toga to retain the Princess Tag Team Championship	
5	MLW	Eric Bischoff's One Shot	Queens, New York	CozyMax (Satoshi Kojima and Okumura) defeated Contra Unit (Minoru Suzuki and Ikuro Kwon) (c) to win the MLW World Tag Team Championship	
5	MLW	Holiday Rush	Queens, New York	Satoshi Kojima (c) defeated Último Guerrero to retain the MLW World Heavyweight Championship	Aired on tape delay on December 24.
6	GCW	Ransom	Tampa, Florida	Mance Warner (c) defeated Fuego Del Sol to retain the GCW World Championship	
7	GCW	Mastermind	Atlanta, Georgia	Mance Warner (c) defeated Tank in a Deathmatch to retain the GCW World Championship	
7	REVOLVER	Season Finale	Clive, Iowa	Alpha Sigma Sigma (Brent Oakley and KC Jacobs) defeated RED (Alex Colon and Dark Pledge) (c) in a No Rope Barbwire match to win the PWR Tag Team Championship	
7	WWE: NXT	Deadline	Minneapolis, Minnesota	Giulia defeated Sol Ruca, Stephanie Vaquer, Zaria, and Wren Sinclair in a Women's Iron Survivor Challenge to become the #1 contender for the NXT Women's Championship at NXT: New Year's Evil	
8	AJPW	Real World Tag League; Final	Tokyo, Japan	Saito Brothers (Jun and Rei Saito) defeated Davey Boy Smith Jr. and Kento Miyahara in the Real World Tag League final	
8	NJPW	World Tag League; Final	Mashiki, Japan	Los Ingobernables de Japon (Tetsuya Naito and Hiromu Takahashi) defeated Bullet Club War Dogs (Gabe Kidd and Sanada) in the World Tag League final	
8	Stardom	Goddesses of Stardom Tag League; Final	Shizuoka, Japan	wing★gori (Hanan and Saya Iida) defeated High Mate (Maika and Hanako) in the Goddesses of Stardom Tag League final	
8	DPW	3rd Anniversary	Durham, North Carolina	LaBron Kozone defeated Adam Priest (c) to win the DPW National Championship	Aired on tape delay on December 15.
11	AEW	Winter Is Coming	Kansas City, Missouri	Mariah May (c) defeated Mina Shirakawa to retain the AEW Women's World Championship	Aired as a special episode of AEW Dynamite.
11	AEW	Winter Is Coming	Kansas City, Missouri	Powerhouse Hobbs and Mark Davis defeated The Don Callis Family (Konosuke Takeshita and Lance Archer)	Aired on tape delay on December 13 as a special episode of AEW Rampage.
12	AEW	Winter Is Coming	St. Louis, Missouri	Mark Briscoe defeated Kyle Fletcher in an AEW Continental Classic Blue League match	Aired on tape delay on December 14 as a special episode of AEW Collision.
13	Marigold	Winter Wonderful Fight; Night 2	Tokyo, Japan	Sareee (c) defeated Nanae Takahashi to retain the Marigold World Championship	
13	TNA	Final Resolution	Atlanta, Georgia	Nic Nemeth (c) defeated A. J. Francis to retain the TNA World Championship	
13	GCW	Scene of The Crime	Phoenix, Arizona	Matthew Justice defeated Jimmy Lloyd in a Hardcore match	
14	GCW	Highest in The Room 3	Los Angeles, California	Matthew Justice defeated Dr. Redacted	
14	NWA	Looks That Kill	Dothan, Alabama	Thom Latimer (c) defeated EC3 in a Steel Cage match to retain the NWA Worlds Heavyweight Championship	Taping for NWA Powerrr.
14	APFW: NJPW; IGF; IPW; DFW; HKWF	Immortal Fighting Spirit	Shanghai, China	United Empire (Francesco Akira and Great-O-Khan) defeated Master Wato and Satoshi Kojima	
14	WWE: Raw; SmackDown	Saturday Night's Main Event XXXVII	Uniondale, New York	Cody Rhodes (c) defeated Kevin Owens to retain the Undisputed WWE Championship	First televised Saturday Night's Main Event show since 2008. Featured the crowning of the inaugural WWE Women's United States Champion.
15	NJPW	Strong Style Evolved	Long Beach, California	Mercedes Moné (c) defeated Hazuki to retain the Strong Women's Championship	
18	AEW	Holiday Bash	Washington, D.C.	Death Riders (Jon Moxley, Pac, and Wheeler Yuta) defeated "Hangman" Adam Page, Jay White, and Orange Cassidy	Aired as a special episode of AEW Dynamite.
18	AEW	Holiday Bash	Washington, D.C.	Brody King defeated Komander in an AEW Continental Classic Gold League match	Aired on tape delay on December 20 as a special episode of AEW Rampage.
20	ROH	Final Battle	New York City, New York	Athena (c) defeated Billie Starkz to retain the ROH Women's World Championship	
20	HOG	Live for The Moment	New York City, New York	The Hardys (Jeff Hardy and Matt Hardy) defeated The Mane Event (Jay Lyon and Midas Black)	
21	RevPro	Uprising	London, England	Michael Oku defeated Luke Jacobs (c) to win the Undisputed British Heavyweight Championship	
21	REVOLVER	Holiday Special	Richmond, Indiana	Alpha Sigma Sigma (Brent Oakley and KC Jacobs), Jake Crist and Jody Threat defeated RED (Alex Colon, Dark Pledge, Jessicka Havok and Rickey Shane Page) in a Holiday Hardcore match	
21	AEW	Christmas Collision	New York City, New York	Claudio Castagnoli defeated Darby Allin in an AEW Continental Classic Gold League match	Aired as a special episode of AEW Collision.
22	AEW	Dynamite on 34th Street	New York City, New York	Kyle Fletcher defeated Daniel Garcia in an AEW Continental Classic Blue League match	Aired on tape delay on December 25 as a special episode of AEW Dynamite.
22	AEW	New Year's Smash	New York City, New York	Hook defeated Nick Wayne	Aired on tape delay on December 27 as a special episode of AEW Rampage, which was the final episode of Rampage.
26	Stardom	New Blood 17	Tokyo, Japan	Rice or Bread (Waka Tsukiyama and Hanako) defeated Devil Princess (Rina and Azusa Inaba) (c) to win the New Blood Tag Team Championship	
28	AEW	Worlds End	Orlando, Florida	Jon Moxley (c) defeated Orange Cassidy, "Hangman" Adam Page, and Jay White to retain the AEW World Championship	
28	GCW	Take Kare	Seattle, Washington	Mance Warner (c) defeated Masha Slamovich to retain the GCW World Championship	
28	CF: DDT	Ultimate Party	Tokyo, Japan	Chris Brookes (c) defeated Daisuke Sasaki to retain the KO-D Openweight Championship	
29	Stardom	Dream Queendom	Tokyo, Japan	Saya Kamitani defeated Tam Nakano (c) to win the World of Stardom Championship	
29	Progress	Chapter 175: Unboxing VII: The Curtain Call	London, England	Luke Jacobs (c) defeated Leon Slater, Man Like DeReiss and Ricky Knight Jr. to retain the PROGRESS World Championship	
29	DEFY	Blueprint	Seattle, Washington	Kenta (c) defeated Schaff to retain the DEFY World Championship	
31	GCW	Til Infinity	Ridgefield Park, New Jersey	Megan Bayne won a 30-person Do or Die Rumble by last eliminating Atticus Cogar to earn a GCW World Championship match	
(c) – denotes defending champion(s)

== Notable events ==
- January 2 – WWE NXT in the United Kingdom returned to the WWE Network after airing on TNT Sports since January 2020.
- January 5 – Impact Plus relaunched as TNA+ and distributed by Endeavor Streaming.
- January 13 – Impact Wrestling reverted to its original Total Nonstop Action Wrestling (TNA) name, beginning with Hard To Kill (TNA had been renamed to Impact in 2017); at the event, Nic Nemeth, A. J. Francis, and Ash by Elegance made their TNA debuts, while DeAngelo Williams made his TNA return.
- January 23 – Dwayne "The Rock" Johnson was appointed to the board of directors of TKO Group Holdings, the parent company of WWE. Additionally, WWE announced that in the United States, WWE Raw would move to Netflix in January 2025, leaving linear television for the first time since its inception in January 1993 and after airing on the USA Network since October 2005, while outside of the US, it and WWE's other programs would also move to the streaming platform, which officially closed down the WWE Network in most of the world; a select few countries still maintain the WWE Network due to pre-existing contracts, after which, they will transition to Netflix.
- January 26 – Following a sexual allegations lawsuit, Vince McMahon resigned from TKO Group Holdings and WWE as a whole.
- January 27 –
  - At WWE's Royal Rumble event, Naomi, Liv Morgan, and Andrade made their WWE returns, while Jade Cargill made her WWE in-ring debut.
  - On AEW Collision, Serena Deeb wrestled her first match in 15 months after a hiatus following several seizures.
- February 4 – Bushiroad terminates the contract of World Wonder Ring Stardom founder and executive producer Rossy Ogawa following accusations of poaching talent from the promotion.
- February 6 – NWA Powerrr premiered on The CW's streaming app after airing solely on YouTube since January 2023. Older episodes of Powerrr had previously been uploaded to The CW app in November 2023.
- February 7 – Anthem Sports & Entertainment President Anthony Cicone was appointed President of Total Nonstop Action Wrestling (TNA), replacing Scott D'Amore, whose contract was terminated.
- March 6 – Kazuchika Okada officially signed with All Elite Wrestling (AEW), making his first appearance as an AEW roster member on AEW Dynamite.
- March 13 – Mercedes Moné officially signed with All Elite Wrestling (AEW), debuting at AEW Dynamite: Big Business.
- March 16 – On AEW Collision, Kyle O'Reilly wrestled his first match in two years after undergoing neck surgery.
- April 1 – Ganbare Pro-Wrestling became independent from CyberFight.
- April 3 – WWE Speed premiered on X.
- April 6 –
  - Giulia officially signed with WWE, first shown in the crowd at NXT Stand & Deliver.
  - During night one of WrestleMania XL, Sami Zayn defeated Gunther to become the WWE Intercontinental Champion, thus ending the latter's record-setting 666-day reign with the title; Zayn became the first man to pin Gunther in a one-on-one match since the latter debuted on the main roster on April 8, 2022.
- April 7 – During night two of WrestleMania XL, Cody Rhodes defeated Roman Reigns to become the Undisputed WWE Champion, thus ending the latter's 1,316-day reign as world champion; Rhodes became the first man to pin Reigns in a one-on-one match since December 2019 and also became the first Rhodes family member to hold a world championship in WWE.
- April 10 – During AEW Dynamite, All Elite Wrestling (AEW) released on-air surveillance footage of the backstage altercation between CM Punk and Jack Perry that took place at the 2023 All In event.
- April 12 – On WWE SmackDown, Tama Tonga officially debuted for WWE, aligning himself with The Bloodline stable.
- April 15 – Rossy Ogawa officially announced his new promotion, Dream Star Fighting Marigold.
- April 20 – Mike Santana, Sami Callihan, and "Broken" Matt Hardy made their TNA returns at Rebellion.
- April 21 – At Dynasty, Jack Perry returned to All Elite Wrestling (AEW), marking his first AEW appearance since the 2023 All In event.
- April 22 – New Japan Pro-Wrestling (NJPW) acquires Bushiroad Fight, parent company of World Wonder Ring Stardom, renaming it Stardom Co. Ltd. as a subsidiary of NJPW, effective June 28.
- May 4 – At Backlash France, Tanga Loa, Tama Tonga's half-brother, returned to WWE, aligning himself with The Bloodline stable.
- May 6 – United Japan Pro-wrestling (UJPW), an alliance of Japanese wrestling promotions, held its first event, the 2024 All Together.
- May 20 – Marigold held its first event, Fields Forever.
- May 28 – TNA Knockouts World Champion Jordynne Grace appears on WWE NXT to challenge NXT Women's Champion Roxanne Perez, beginning a crossover between Total Nonstop Action Wrestling (TNA) and NXT.
- June 14 – At Against All Odds, WWE NXT wrestler Tatum Paxley made her TNA in-ring debut, and Jeff Hardy made his return to TNA.
- June 17 – At the end of WWE Raw, The Wyatt Sicks stable made their debut.
- June 18 – Total Nonstop Action Wrestling wrestler Joe Hendry made his NXT in-ring debut.
- June 21 – On WWE SmackDown, Jacob Fatu made his WWE debut, aligning himself with The Bloodline stable.
- June 28 – New Japan Pro-Wrestling's (NJPW) merger with World Wonder Ring Stardom was finalized, making Stardom a subsidiary of NJPW.
- July 6 – During WWE's Money in the Bank, John Cena announced that 2025 would be his final year as an in-ring performer, retiring at the end of that year.
- August 3 – At SummerSlam, Roman Reigns made his return to WWE for the first time since WrestleMania XL in April.
- August 8 – Scott D'Amore announced the relaunch of Maple Leaf Wrestling as Maple Leaf Pro Wrestling (MLP) with its inaugural two-night event, "Forged in Excellence", scheduled to take place on October 19 and 20.
- September 13 – WWE SmackDown returned to USA Network after airing on Fox since October 2019.
- September 14 – World of Sport Wrestling was revived and returned to taping after six years.
- September 30 – NWA Powerrr episodes were removed from The CW's streaming app, ahead of WWE NXT's premiere on The CW channel. Peacock also began removing archived episodes of NXT due to its move to The CW. Archived episodes are not available on The CW app, but replays of new episodes are.
- October 1 –
  - WWE NXT in the United States premiered on The CW after airing on the USA Network since September 2019. It was also broadcast live for the first time outside the state of Florida.
  - NWA Powerrr premiered on X.
- October 7 – WWE Raw returned to two hours for the first time since WWE Raw 1000 in July 2012. This remained until the show moved to Netflix in January 2025, subsequently averaging 2.5 hours per episode.
- October 19 – Final episode of AEW Battle of the Belts.
- October 29 – WWE announced the WWE ID program, which develops and supports the training of independent professional wrestlers at specified schools or promotions and provide them a pathway to the promotion.
- December 13 – At Final Resolution, Tessa Blanchard made her return to Total Nonstop Action Wrestling (TNA), four years after her contract was originally terminated with the company.
- December 24 – WWE's annual Tribute to the Troops was quietly canceled without a 2024 event held.
- December 27 –
  - Final episode of AEW Rampage, which aired as the annual New Year's Smash special.
  - Final episode of WWE NXT Level Up.
- December 30 – Final episode of WWE Raw on linear television as the program moved to Netflix on January 6, 2025.
- December 31 - Multiple Ice Ribbon wrestlers depart the promotion as full-time wrestlers including Yuki Mashiro, Saran, Mio Shirai, Mifu Ashida, and Nanae Furukawa.

== Accomplishments and tournaments ==
=== 2AW ===
Accomplishment	Winner(s)	Date	Notes
Active Advance Tournament	Ayato Yoshida	September 29	Defeated Chris Vice to win.

=== AAA ===
Accomplishment	Winner(s)	Date	Notes
Copa Dia de Reyes	Histeriosys	January 7	Last eliminated Relámpago in a torneo cibernetico to win.
Reina de Reinas	Lady Shani	February 3	Defeated Faby Apache in the final to win.
Rey de Reyes	El Hijo del Vikingo	February 3	Defeated El Texano Jr. and Laredo Kid in the final to win.
Copa Princess Boy	Star Boy	March 1	Defeated Delfin Jr., Andog Black, King Chango, Koyac, and Super Pollo to win.
Copa Bardahl: Monterrey Gauntlet Match	Pimpinela Escarlata	April 27	Last eliminated Antifaz del Norte to win.
Copa Triplemanía: Tijuana Match	Team The Crash (D'Luxe, Noisy Boy, and Destiny)	June 15	Defeated Team AAA (Komander, Laredo Kid, and Octagón Jr.) and Team Rest of the World (Cima, Dinamico, and Willie Mack) to win.
Copa Bardahl: Mexico City Gauntlet Match	Octogón Jr.	August 17	Last eliminated Zumbido to win.
Copa Antonio Peña	Chik Tormenta	October 6	Last eliminated Mini Vikingo to win.

=== AEW ===
Accomplishment	Winner(s)	Date	Notes
AEW World Tag Team Championship Tournament	The Young Bucks (Matthew Jackson and Nicholas Jackson)	April 21	Defeated FTR (Cash Wheeler and Dax Harwood) in the final, which was a ladder match, to win the vacant AEW World Tag Team Championship.
Double or Nothing Casino Gauntlet Match	Will Ospreay	April 24	Pinned Komander to earn an AEW International Championship match at Double or Nothing. He defeated Roderick Strong to win the title at the event.
FTW Contender Series	Hook and Katsuyori Shibata	May 22	Both defeated Bryan Keith in the final by applying dual submission holds to earn an FTW Championship match at Double or Nothing. They challenged Chris Jericho for the title in a three-way FTW Rules match for the title at the event but neither was successful.
Forbidden Door Casino Gauntlet Match	Will Ospreay	May 29	Pinned Orange Cassidy to earn an AEW World Championship match at Forbidden Door. He challenged Swerve Strickland for the title at the event but was unsuccessful.
Owen Hart Cup (Women)	Mariah May	July 10	Defeated Willow Nightingale in the final to win the Owen Hart Cup Trophy, Championship, and an AEW Women's World Championship match at All In. She defeated "Timeless" Toni Storm to win the title at the event.
Owen Hart Cup (Men)	Bryan Danielson	July 10	Defeated "Hangman" Adam Page in the final to win the Owen Hart Cup Trophy, Championship, and an AEW World Championship match at All In. He defeated Swerve Strickland in a Title vs. Career match to win the title at the event.
Royal Rampage	Darby Allin	July 24 (aired July 26)	Last eliminated Claudio Castagnoli to earn an AEW World Championship match at Dynamite: Grand Slam. He was supposed to challenge Bryan Danielson for the title at the event, but will instead face Jon Moxley to determine who will challenge Danielson at WrestleDream.
All In Casino Gauntlet Match	Christian Cage	August 25	Pinned Kyle O'Reilly to earn an AEW World Championship match at the time and place of his choosing. Cage would enact his match contract during the match between champion Jon Moxley and Cope at Revolution, but was unsuccessful in winning the title.
Grand Slam Tag Team Casino Gauntlet Match	Will Ospreay and Kyle Fletcher	September 11	Fletcher pinned Dante Martin of Top Flight to earn an AEW World Tag Team Championship match at Dynamite: Grand Slam. They challenged The Young Bucks (Matthew Jackson and Nicholas Jackson) for the titles at the event but were unsuccessful.
Full Gear Four-Way Contender Series	Private Party (Isiah Kassidy and Marq Quen)	November 23	Defeated The Outrunners (Truth Magnum and Turbo Floyd), Kings of the Black Throne (Malakai Black and Brody King), and The Acclaimed (Anthony Bowens and Max Caster) in the final to retain the AEW World Tag Team Championship.
Dynamite Diamond Battle Royale	Adam Cole and Kyle O'Reilly	December 4	12-man battle royal to determine the two participants in the Dynamite Diamond Semifinal to determine who advances to the Dynamite Diamond Final to face reigning ring holder MJF for the AEW Dynamite Diamond Ring. Cole and O'Reilly co-won the battle royal and faced each other the following week at Dynamite: Winter Is Coming. Cole subsequently defeated O'Reilly and challenged MJF for the Dynamite Diamond Ring at Worlds End, but was unsuccessful.
Continental Classic	Kazuchika Okada	December 28	Defeated Will Ospreay in the final to retain the AEW Continental Championship.

=== AJPW ===
Accomplishment	Winner(s)	Date	Notes
Champion Carnival	Kento Miyahara	May 12	Defeated Jun Saito in the final to earn a Triple Crown Heavyweight Championship match. He challenged Yuma Anzai for the title on Night 1 of the Super Power Series tour, but was unsuccessful.
Royal Road Tournament	Ren Ayabe	September 22	Defeated Ryuki Honda in the final to earn a Triple Crown Heavyweight Championship match. He challenged Yuma Aoyagi for the title on Night 4 of the Raising an Army Memorial Series tour, but was unsuccessful
Real World Tag League	Saito Brothers (Jun Saito and Rei Saito)	December 8	Defeated Kento Miyahara and Davey Boy Smith Jr. to win.

=== BJW ===
Accomplishment	Winner(s)	Date	Notes
Super Hot One Day Tag Tournament	Abdullah Kobayashi and Takuya Nomura	February 20	Defeated Climax Jump (Kankuro Hoshino and Yuki Ishikawa) in the final to win.
Ikkitousen Special League Deathmatch Straight Flash	Hideyoshi Kamitani	July 25	Defeated Daiju Wakamatsu in the final to win. This was a Royal Straight Flash Deathmatch.
King of Deathmatch World GP Tournament	Akira	December 31	Defeated Daiju Wakamatsu in the final to win.

=== CF ===
==== DDT ====
Accomplishment	Winner(s)	Date	Notes
D-Oh Grand Prix	Yukio Naya	January 4	Defeated Tetsuya Endo in the final to earn a KO-D Openweight Championship match. He challenged Yuki Ueno for the title at Sweet Dreams! but was unsuccessful.
D Generations Cup	To-y	April 7	Defeated Rukiya in the final to earn a spot in the King of DDT Tournament.
King of DDT Tournament	Mao	May 26	Defeated Daisuke Sasaki in the final to earn a KO-D Openweight Championship match. He challenged Yuki Ueno for the title at Wrestle Peter Pan but was unsuccessful.
World Ōmori Championship #1 Contender's Battle Royal	Antonio Honda and Kazuki Hirata	November 10	Declared co-winners after a double pin to earn a World Ōmori Championship match.

==== Noah ====
Accomplishment	Winner(s)	Date	Notes
Victory Challenge Tag League	Kaito Kiyomiya and Ryohei Oiwa	March 10	Defeated Real (Saxon Huxley and Timothy Thatcher) in the final to earn a GHC Tag Team Championship match. They were set to challenge Good Looking Guys (Jack Morris and Anthony Greene) for the titles at Great Voyage in Yokohama, but an injury to Kiyomiya forced them off the event. Real would replace them in the match but failed to win the titles.
N-1 Victory	Kaito Kiyomiya	September 1	Defeated Kenoh in the final to retain the GHC Heavyweight Championship. Kiyomiya would become the first man to win the tournament three times and the first man to win the tournament as GHC Heavyweight Champion.
N Innovation	Dragon Bane	November 6	Defeated Junta Miyawaki in the final to earn a GHC Junior Heavyweight Championship match. He challenged Daga for the title at Deathnity but was unsuccessful.
GHC Women's Championship Battle Royal	Kouki Amarei	November 11	Last eliminated Sadie Gibbs to become the inaugural GHC Women's Champion.

==== TJPW ====
Accomplishment	Winner(s)	Date	Notes
Princess of Princess Championship #1 Contender's Battle Royal	Miu Watanabe	January 6	Last eliminated Yuki Kamifuku to earn a Princess of Princess Championship match. She would defeat Miyu Yamashita to win the title at Grand Princess.
"Futari wa Princess" Max Heart Tournament	Daisy Monkey (Arisu Endo and Suzume)	February 10	Defeated Hakuchumu (Miu Watanabe and Rika Tatsumi) in the final to earn a Princess Tag Team Championship match. They would defeat Ryo Mizunami and Yuki Aino to win the titles at Grand Princess.
Tokyo Princess Cup	Ryo Mizunami	August 25	Defeated Yuki Aino in the final to earn a Princess of Princess Championship match. She challenged Miu Watanabe for the title at Wrestle Princess V but was unsuccessful.
Next Generation Tournament	Haru Kazashiro	November 22	Defeated Toga in the final to win.
Princess Rumble	Miu Watanabe	December 29	Last eliminated Yuki Aino to win prizes from WinTicket Inc..

=== GanPro ===
Accomplishment	Winner(s)	Date	Notes
Spirit of Ganbare World Openweight Championship #1 Contender's Battle Royal	Hong Kong International Policeman	June 2	Last eliminated Ken Ohka to earn a Spirit of Ganbare World Openweight Championship match. He challenged Keisuke Ishii for the title at Disaster Artist but was unsuccessful.

=== CMLL ===
Accomplishment	Winner(s)	Date	Notes
CMLL World Tag Team Championship Eliminator Tournament	El Triangulo (El Hijo del Villano III and Villano III Jr.)	January 9	Defeated Los Divinos Laguneros (Blue Panther Jr. and Dark Panther) in the final to earn a CMLL World Tag Team Championship match. They challenged Los Hermanos Chavez (Ángel de Oro and Niebla Roja) for the titles on January 16 but were unsuccessful.
Occidente Women's Tag Team Championship Eliminator Tournament	Hatanna and Katara	January 23	Defeated Adira and La Pantera in the final to win the vacant titles.
Cuadrangulo de Trios VIP	Los Bárbaros (Bárbaro Cavernario, Dragón Rojo Jr., and El Terrible)	January 29	Defeated Atlantis Jr., Volador Jr., and Star Jr. in the final win.
Torneo Gran Alternativa	Místico and Brillante Jr.	February 2	Defeated Máscara Dorada and Neón in the final to win.
Reyes del Aire	Místico	February 6	Defeated Ángel de Oro, Templario, Máscara Dorada, Volador Jr., Soberano Jr., Titán, Zandokan Jr, Flip Gordon, Star Jr., Esfinge, and Villano III Jr. to win
Interfaction Tag Team Tournament	Los Guerreros Laguneros (Último Guerrero and Stuka Jr.)	February 17	Defeated Los Depredadores (Magnus and Volador Jr.) in the final to win.
Torneo de Escuelas	Team Mexico (Alom, Astro Boy Jr., Dragon de Fuego, Forneo, Hunter, and Legendario)	February 23	Defeated Team Puebla (El Hijo de Niebla Roja, El Malayo, El Novato, Rayo Metalico, Apocalipsis, and Xelhua) in the final to win.
Gran Alternativa Tapatia	Arlequin and Garrabato	February 20	Defeated Abigor La Pesadilla and Cris Skin, Adrenalina and Obek, Amenaza Negra Jr. and Minotauro, Bestia Negra and Rav, Canalla and Principe Daniel, Cowboy and Omar Brunetti, Demonio Maya and Mandala, Fantastico and Halcon de Plata, Guerrero de la Muerte and Shezmu, Johnny Dinamo and Prince Drago, and Leo and Temerario to win.
Torneo de Cibernético de Amazonas	Reyna Isis	February 26	Defeated Andrómeda, Aseroth, Dark Silueta, Diablita Roja, Lady Amazona, Lady Metal, Manía, Skadi, and Zeuxis to win.
Copa Irma Gonzalez	Marcela	March 8	Defeated La Amapola, La Vaquerita, Tiffany, La Maligna, La Metálica, Hera, Olympia, Valkria, La Guerrera, Persephone, and Diablita Roja to win.
Torneo de Parejas Increíbles	Máscara Dorada and Rocky Romero	March 29	Defeated Soberano Jr. and Atlantis Jr. in the final to win.
CMLL Universal Championship	Máscara Dorada	April 26	Defeated Magnus and Titán in the final to win.
Embajador de los Ninos	Neón	April 28	Last eliminated Zandokan Jr. in a torneo cibernetico to win.
La Copa Junior VIP	Star Jr.	May 31	Defeated Ángel de Oro in the final to win.
Copa Dinastías	Los Soberanos (Euforia and Soberano Jr.)	June 16	Defeated Los Stukas (Stuka Jr. and Hijo de Stuka Jr.) in the final to win.
Copa Fantastica	The DKC	July 13	Defeated Viento, Cucuy, and Adrian Quest to win the Copa Fantastica Trophy.
CMLL Barroco Championship	Xelhua	July 15	Defeated Vegas to win.
Cuadrangular de Dinastias	Euforia and Soberano Jr.	July 15	Defeated Atlantis and Atlantis Jr. in the final to win.
AEW International Championship Eliminator Tournament	Templario	July 23	Last eliminated Averno in a torneo cibernetico to earn an AEW International Championship match. He challenged MJF for the title on the August 2 Viernes Espectacular show, but was unsuccessful.
Leyenda de Plata	Ángel de Oro	July 26	Defeated Star Jr. in the final to win.
CMLL World Women's Tag Team Championship Eliminator Tournament	Tessa Blanchard and Lluvia	August 6	Defeated Zeuxis and Persephone in the final to win the vacant titles.
International Gran Prix	Claudio Castagnoli	August 23	Last eliminated Volador Jr. to win the International Gran Prix Trophy for Team International.
Copa Independencia	Titán	September 13	Defeated Máscara Dorada in the final to win.
CMLL Universal Amazons Championship	Persephone	October 18	Defeated Zeuxis in the final to win.
International Women's Gran Prix	Reyna Isis	October 25	Last eliminated Red Velvet to win the International Gran Prix Trophy for Team Mexico.
Torneo Cibernetico de Pequenos	Shockercito	October 27	Last eliminated Mercurio to win.
Rey del Inframundo	Difunto	November 1	Defeated defending champion Bárbaro Cavernario, Xelhua, and Barboza in the final, which was a four-way elimination match to win.
Copa Tzompantli de Amazonas	La Catalina	November 3	Last eliminated Persephone in a torneo cibernetico to win.
Copa Mujeres Revolucionnarias	Persephone	November 18	Last eliminated Tessa Blanchard in a torneo cibernetico to win.
Leyenda de Azul	Místico	November 29	Defeated Hechicero in the final to win.
Torneo Gran Alternativa	Templario and Legendario	December 27	Defeated Último Guerrero and Crixus in the final to win.

=== The Crash ===
Accomplishment	Winner(s)	Date	Notes
Copa Juvenil	Noisy Boy	January 19	Defeated Khavall, El Rey, Bamboo, Proximo, and Spider Fly to win.
Cope The Crash	Anubis	November 8	Defeated Keyra, Negro Casas, Niño Hamburguesa, Electroshock, Cinico, Emperador Azteca, Mamba, Que Moniito, Valentino, and Peluche to win.

=== CZW ===
Accomplishment	Winner(s)	Date	Notes
Best of the Best XX	Kenta	May 18	Defeated Griffin McCoy in the final to win.
Tournament of Death 21	Mickie Knuckles	September 21 (aired October 6)	Defeated Judge Joe Dred in the final to win.
CZW Wired Championship #1 Contender's Elimination Scramble	Juni Underwood	December 21	Last eliminated Samwell Thompson to compete for the reactivated CZW Wired Championship.

=== DG ===
Accomplishment	Winner(s)	Date	Notes
Rey de Parejas	Naruki Doi and Dragon Kid	April 10	Defeated Susumu Yokosuka and Yamato in the final to earn an Open the Twin Gate Championship match. They defeated Kaito Kiyomiya and Alejandro to win the titles at Dead or Alive.
King of Gate	Dragon Dia	December 3	Defeated Kota Minoura in the final to earn an Open the Dream Gate Championship match. He challenged Yamato for the title in a Winner Takes All match at The Final Gate, also for Dia's Open the Brave Gate Championship, but was unsuccessful.
Royal Sambo	Strong Machine J	December 27	Last eliminated Luis Mante to earn an Open the Dream Gate Championship match. He challenged Yamato for the title at The Gate of Bayside but was unsuccessful.

=== DPW ===
Accomplishment	Winner(s)	Date	Notes
Tag Festival	Violence is Forever (Dominic Garrini and Kevin Ku)	July 7 (aired July 13)	Defeated Miracle Generation (Dustin Waller and Kylon King), MxM (Mason Madden and Mansoor), and Grizzled Young Veterans (James Drake and Zack Gibson) in the final to earn a DPW Worlds Tag Team Championship. They defeated Speedball × Something (Mike Bailey and Jake Something) at 3rd Anniversary to win the titles.
Carolina Classic	Jake Something	September 15 (aired September 22)	Defeated Luke Jacobs, LaBron Kozone, and Mike Bailey in the final, which was a four-way elimination match, to earn a DPW Worlds Championship match. He defeated Calvin Tankman to win the title at Super Battle.
Battle of the Best	Dani Luna	October 13 (aired October 19)	Defeated Shoko Nakajima in the final to earn a DPW Women's Worlds Championship match. She defeated Miyuki Takase to win the title at Title Fight in Texas.

=== GCW ===
Accomplishment	Winner(s)	Date	Notes
Jersey J-Cup	Masha Slamovich	February 10	Defeated Jordan Oliver in the final to win the JCW World Championship.
Bloodsport Women's Tournament	Marina Shafir	April 4	Defeated Lindsay Snow in the final to win.
Grab the Brass Ring ladder match	Cole Radrick	April 5	Defeated Aigle Blanc, Arez, Leon Slater, Myron Reed, Microman, Alec Price, Marcus Mathers, and Mr. Danger in a nine-man ladder match to earn a championship match at the time and place of his choosing. He invoked his opportunity to challenge Masha Slamovich for the JCW World Championship at Believe Me but was unsuccessful.
Clusterfuck Battle Royal	Microman	April 6	Last eliminated Nick Gage to win.
Tournament of Survival	John Wayne Murdoch	June 1	Defeated Yuki Ishikawa in the final to win.
Matt Cardona Gauntlet of Survival	Joey Janela	June 2	Last eliminated "Broski" Jimmy Lloyd to win the vacant GCW World Championship.
Bloodsport Bushido One-Day Tournament	Hideki Suzuki	June 22	Defeated Erik Hammer in the final to win.
Nick Gage Invitational	Sawyer Wreck	November 16	Defeated Brandon Kirk in the final to win Kirk's GCW Ultraviolent Championship.
Do or Die Rumble	Megan Bayne	December 31	Last eliminated Atticus Cogar to earn a GCW World Championship match at the time and place of her choosing.

=== GWF ===
Accomplishment	Winner(s)	Date	Notes
Light Heavyweight World Cup	Ahura	May 18	Defeated Tim Stübing, Peter Tihanyi, and Aigle Blanc in the final, which was contested as a four-way elimination match, to earn a GWF Berlin Championship match at Rising Heat. He defeated Crowchester to win the title at the event.
Battlefield match	Peter Tihanyi	September 1	Last eliminated Erkan Sulcani to earn a GWF World Championship match. He defeated Toni Harting to win the title at GWF Legacy: 29 Jahre Berling Wrestling.

=== Gleat ===
Accomplishment	Winner(s)	Date	Notes
G-Infinity Championship Tournament	Coelacanths (Cima and Kaz Hayashi)	March 13	Defeated #StrongHearts (Seiki Yoshioka and T-Hawk) in the final to win the vacant titles.

=== HOG ===
Accomplishment	Winner(s)	Date	Notes
Matt Travis Memorial Battle Royal	Raheem Royal	July 26	Won after Jay Armani and Joey Silver eliminated each other to earn a championship match contract. Royal would trade his contract with Charles Mason to join The Cold Blooded Killers and become one of the HOG Tag Team Champions. Mason would then invoke the contract during the HOG Heavyweight Championship match between champion Mike Santana and Tomohiro Ishii at Mike Santana Presents Puerto Rican Weekend, where he subsequently won the title.

=== Ice Ribbon ===
Accomplishment	Winner(s)	Date	Notes
Ribbon-1 Tournament	Hamuko Hoshi	January 27	Defeated Asuka Fujitaki in the final to win.
ICE×∞ Championship League	Yuuri	June 23	Defeated Hamuko Hoshi in the final to win the vacant title.

=== IWRG ===
Accomplishment	Winner(s)	Date	Notes
El Protector	DMT Azul and Tornado	February 18	Defeated Aguila Roja and El Hijo de Canis Lupus, Fussion and Hell Boy, El Hijo del Pirata Morgan and Lenador, Multifacetico Jr. and Rey Aztaroth, and Rey Halcon and Vangellys to win.
Rey del Ring	Vangellys	May 5	Won the torneo cibernetico elimination match to earn an IWRG Rey del Ring Championship match. He defeated Vito Fratelli on May 12 to win the title.
Ruleta de la Muerte	El Hijo de Canis Lupus and L. A. Park Jr.	August 4	Defeated Vangellys and El Hijo de Silver King in the final to win.

=== JTO ===
Accomplishment	Winner(s)	Date	Notes
JTO Tournament	Fire Katsumi	February 4	Defeated Genta Yubari in the final to win.
JTO Girls Tournament	Tomoka Inaba	March 1	Defeated Azusa Inaba in the final to win and retain the Queen of JTO.
JTO Tag Team Championship Tournament	Myo-o (Hiro Iijima and Ryoma Tsukamoto)	October 5	Defeated Genesis (Akira Jumonji and Fire Katsumi) in the final to become the inaugural champions.
JTO Girls Tag Team Championship Tournament	Aoi and Tomoka Inaba	October 5	Defeated Misa Kagura and Yuuri in the final to become the inaugural champions.

=== M-Pro ===
Accomplishment	Winner(s)	Date	Notes
Fukumen World League	Pantera Jr.	October 13 (aired October 20)	Defeated Kenbai in the final to earn a Tohoku Junior Heavyweight Championship match. He defeated Rui Hiugaji on Night two of Hito Tsubu Mani on November 17 to win the title.

=== MLW ===
Accomplishment	Winner(s)	Date	Notes
Battle Riot	Matt Riddle	June 1	Last eliminated Sami Callihan to earn an MLW World Heavyweight Championship match at the time and place of his choosing. He invoked his opportunity to challenge Satoshi Kojima for the title at Kings of Colosseum.
Opera Cup	Místico	September 14	Defeated Kenta in the final to win the Opera Cup trophy.

=== Marigold ===
Accomplishment	Winner(s)	Date	Notes
Marigold Super Fly Championship Tournament	Natsumi Showzuki	July 13	Defeated Misa Matsui in the final to become the inaugural champion.
Marigold United National Championship Tournament	Miku Aono	July 13	Defeated Bozilla in the final to become the inaugural champion.
Marigold Twin Star Championship Tournament	MiraiSaku (Mirai and Mai Sakurai)	July 30	Defeated Miku Aono and Natsumi Showzuki in the final to become the inaugural champions.
Dream Star Grand Prix	Utami Hayashishita	September 28	Defeated Mai Sakurai in the final to earn a Marigold World Championship match. She defeated Sareee to win the title at First Dream.
Twin Star Cup Tournament	MiraiSaku (Mirai and Mai Sakurai)	December 20 (aired December 22)	Defeated Misa Matsui and Natsumi Showzuki in the final to win.
Rookie of the Year Tournament	Minami Yuuki	December 31	Defeated Naho Yamada in the final to win
Marigold Rumble	Bozilla	December 31	Last eliminated Sareee to win.

=== NWA ===
Accomplishment	Winner(s)	Date	Notes
NWA National Championship Tournament	Thom Latimer	March 2 (aired May 7)	Defeated Zyon, Burchill, and Blake "Bulletproof" Troop in the final to win the vacant NWA National Championship.
NWA United States Tag Team Championship Tournament	Daisy Kill and Talos	April 13 (aired July 30)	Defeated The Fixers, L.L.C. (Jay Bradley and Wrecking Ball Legursky) in the final to win the vacant titles.
Crockett Cup	The Southern 6 (Kerry Morton and Alex Taylor)	May 18 (aired July 16)	Defeated The Immortals (Kratos and Odinson) in the final to win the Crockett Cup Trophy and an NWA World Tag Team Championship match. They challenged Knox and Murdoch for the titles at NWA 76 but were unsuccessful.
Matt Cardona's Carnyland Gauntlet Battle Royal	Colby Corino	June 1 (aired September 2)	Last eliminated Slade to earn an NWA Worlds Heavyweight Championship match later in the night. He challenged EC3 for the title but was unsuccessful.
Burke Invitational Gauntlet	Natalia Markova	August 31 (aired October 15)	Last eliminated Tiffany Nieves to earn an NWA World Women's Championship match. She challenged Kenzie Paige for the title On the November 19 episode of NWA Powerrr but lost via disqualification.

=== NJPW ===
Accomplishment	Winner(s)	Date	Notes
New Japan Rumble	Great-O-Khan, Taiji Ishimori, Toru Yano, and Yoh	January 4	Determined who wrestles to become the first provisional 2024 KOPW champion at New Year Dash!!, which was won by Ishimori.
Interfaction Tag Team Tournament	Los Guerreros Laguneros (Último Guerrero and Stuka Jr.)	February 17	Defeated Los Depredadores (Magnus and Volador Jr.) in the final to win.
New Japan Cup	Yota Tsuji	March 20	Defeated Hirooki Goto to earn an IWGP World Heavyweight Championship match at Sakura Genesis. He challenged Tetsuya Naito for the title at the event but was unsuccessful.
NEVER Openweight 6-Man Tag Team Championship Tournament	Boltin Oleg and Be-Bop Tag Team (Toru Yano and Hiroshi Tanahashi)	April 14	Defeated House of Torture (Evil, Sho, and Yoshinobu Kanemaru) in the final to win the vacant titles.
Best of the Super Juniors	El Desperado	June 9	Defeated Taiji Ishimori in the final to earn an IWGP Junior Heavyweight Championship match. He defeated Sho in a steel cage match to win the title on Night 1 of New Japan Soul.
G1 Climax Qualifying Tournament	Callum Newman and Boltin Oleg	July 5	Defeated Yoshi-Hashi and Taichi to qualify for the A Block and B Block, respectively, of G1 Climax 34
Copa Fantastica	The DKC	July 13	Defeated Viento, Cucuy, and Adrian Quest to win the Copa Fantastica Trophy.
G1 Climax	Zack Sabre Jr.	August 18	Defeated Yota Tsuji in the final to earn an IWGP World Heavyweight Championship match. He defeated Tetsuya Naito to win the title at King of Pro-Wrestling.
Super Junior Tag League	Ichiban Sweet Boys (Robbie Eagles and Kosei Fujita)	November 4	Defeated Catch 2/2 (TJP and Francesco Akira) in the final to earn an IWGP Junior Heavyweight Tag Team Championship match at Wrestle Kingdom 19. They defeated Catch 2/2, Bullet Club War Dogs (Clark Connors and Drilla Moloney) and champions Intergalactic Jet Setters (Kushida and Kevin Knight) in a Tokyo Terror ladder match to win the titles at the event.
Tamashii Oceania Cup	Jack Bonza	November 15	Defeated PunchDrunk Istria in the final to win the Tamashii Oceania Cup Trophy.
World Tag League	Los Ingobernables de Japon (Tetsuya Naito and Hiromu Takahashi)	December 8	Defeated Bullet Club War Dogs (Gabe Kidd and Sanada) in the final to earn an IWGP Tag Team Championship match. They faced The Young Bucks (Matthew Jackson and Nicholas Jackson) and United Empire (Great-O-Khan and Jeff Cobb) at Wrestle Dynasty for the vacant titles, which The Young Bucks won.

=== Osaka Pro ===
Accomplishment	Winner(s)	Date	Notes
Osaka Tag Festival	Zeus and Tigers Mask	February 24	Defeated Rogue Nation (Quiet Storm and Yasutaka Oosera) in the final to earn an Osaka Tag Team Championship match. They challenged Rogue Nation (Goliath and Toru) for the titles at Bushi-Do but were unsuccessful.
Light Heavyweight Tournament	Yasutaka Oosera	May 26	Defeated Takoyakida in the final to earn an Osaka Light Heavyweight Championship match. He challenged Ryuya Matsufusa for the title at Castle Festival but was unsuccessful.
Tennōzan	Toru	September 23	Defeated Shigehiro Irie in the final to earn an Osaka Pro Wrestling Championship match. He defeated Zeus to win the title at Excalibur.

=== Progress ===
Accomplishment	Winner(s)	Date	Notes
PROGRESS World Championship #1 Contender's Thunderbastard Match	Kid Lykos	January 28 (aired February 2)	Last eliminated Mark Haskins to earn a PROGRESS World Championship match. He defeated Spike Trivet in a steel cage match to win the title at Chapter 163: Twisted Metal.
Rufus Hound Invitational Battle Royal	Gene Munny	May 27	Last eliminated TK Cooper to win.
Super Strong Style 16	Luke Jacobs	May 27	Defeated Ricky Knight Jr. in the final to earn a PROGRESS World Championship match. He defeated Kid Lykos to win the title at Chapter 169: The Devil On My Shoulder.
PROGRESS World Championship #1 Contender's Thunderbastard Match	Tate Mayfairs	December 29	Last eliminated Eddie Dennis to earn a PROGRESS World Championship match. He challenged Luke Jacobs for the title in a no disqualification match at Chapter 177: My Own Destiny but was unsuccessful.

=== Prestige ===
Accomplishment	Winner(s)	Date	Notes
Cascadia Wrestling Cup	Travis Williams	August 24 (aired on September 3)	Defeated Jaiden in the final to earn a Prestige World Championship match.

=== RevPro ===
Accomplishment	Winner(s)	Date	Notes
Revolution Rumble	Luke Jacobs	March 31	Last eliminated Ricky Knight Jr. to earn an Undisputed British Heavyweight Championship match. He defeated Michael Oku to win the title at the RevPro 12th Anniversary Show.
British J-Cup	Lio Rush	September 28	Defeated Dante Martin, Kid Lykos II, and Cameron Khai in the final, which was a four-way elimination match, to earn an Undisputed British Cruiserweight Championship match. He challenged Will Kraven for the title at High Stakes but was unsuccessful.
Trios Grand Prix	CPF (Danny Black, Joe Lando, and Maverick Mayhem)	November 17	Defeated Zozaya and Barcelona Blacklist (Joey Torres and Sito Sanchez) in the final to earn a title opportunity of their choosing. They chose to challenge for the Undisputed British Tag Team Championship, with Black and Lando challenging Young Guns (Luke Jacobs and Ethan Allen) for the titles at Live in London 95, but were unsuccessful.

=== REVOLVER ===
Accomplishment	Winner(s)	Date	Notes
REVOLVER Rumble	Rhino	September 1	Last eliminated A. J. Francis to win.

=== ROH ===
Accomplishment	Winner(s)	Date	Notes
ROH Women's World Television Championship Tournament	Billie Starkz	April 5	Defeated Queen Aminata in the final to become the inaugural champion.

=== Stardom ===
Accomplishment	Winner(s)	Date	Notes
Triangle Derby	Abarenbo GE (Syuri, Mirai and Ami Sohrei)	January 3	Defeated Baribari Bombers (Giulia, Thekla, and Mai Sakurai) in the final to win the latter's Artist of Stardom Championship.
Rookie of Stardom	Yuzuki	January 3	Defeated Hanako in the final to win the competition.
New Year Wonder Rumble	Starlight Kid	January 6	Last eliminated Hanan to earn a Wonder of Stardom Championship match. She challenged Saori Anou for the title at Supreme Fight but was unsuccessful.
Near Year World Rumble	Saya Kamitani	January 6	Last eliminated Mina Shirakawa to earn a World of Stardom Championship match. She challenged Maika for the title at Supreme Fight but was unsuccessful.
New Year Tag Tournament	AphrOditE (Utami Hayashishita and Saya Kamitani)	January 7	Defeated Eye Contact (Mayu Iwatani and Hanan) in the final to win.
Cinderella Tournament	Hanan	March 20	Defeated Ami Sohrei in the final to earn a "wish" (title opportunity) of her desire. Hanan wished to challenge Saori Anou for the Wonder of Stardom Championship at All Star Grand Queendom, but was unsuccessful in winning the title.
Artist of Stardom Championship #1 Contender's Gauntlet match	Oedo Tai (Momo Watanabe, Natsuko Tora, and Thekla)	May 18	Last eliminated God's Eye (Konami, Syuri, and Saki Kashima) to earn an Artist of Stardom Championship match. They challenged Empress Nexus Venus (Maika, Xena, and Mina Shirakawa) for the titles on June 2 but were unsuccessful.
5 Star Grand Prix Qualifier Tournament	Yuna Mizumori and Miyu Amasaki	July 27 and 28	Defeated Waka Tsukiyama and Lady C to enter the Red A Block and Blue A Block, respectively, of the 5 Star Grand Prix.
5 Star Grand Prix	Maika	August 31	Defeated Saya Kamitani in the final to earn a World of Stardom Championship match. Maika would become the first wrestler to win the tournament undefeated. She challenged Tam Nakano for the title at Namba Grand Fight but was unsuccessful.
High Speed Championship #1 Contender's Battle Royal	Yuna Mizumori	October 5	Last eliminated Ranna Yagami to earn a High Speed Championship match. She challenged Mei Seira for the title on Night 2 of the Goddesses of Stardom Tag League, but was unsuccessful.
Goddesses of Stardom Tag League	wing★gori (Hanan and Saya Iida)	December 8	Defeated High Mate (Maika and Hanako) in the final to earn a Goddess of Stardom Championship match. They defeated H.A.T.E. Supreme (Momo Watanabe and Thekla) to win the titles at Dream Queendom.

=== TNA ===
Accomplishment	Winner(s)	Date	Notes
8-4-1 match (Women)	Steph De Lander	March 22 (aired March 28)	Defeated Alisha Edwards, Havok, Jody Threat, Dani Luna, Masha Slamovich, Rosemary, and Xia Brookside to earn a TNA Knockouts World Championship match at Rebellion. She challenged Jordynne Grace for the title at the event but was unsuccessful.
Call Your Shot Gauntlet	Frankie Kazarian	October 26	Last eliminated Rhino to win the Call Your Shot Trophy for a championship opportunity of his choosing. Kazarian would invoke his opportunity to challenge Joe Hendry for the TNA World Championship at Rebellion, in a three-way match also involving Ethan Page, but was unsuccessful in winning the title.
Thanksgiving Turkey Bowl	Joe Hendry	November 29	Defeated Brian Myers, Rhino, Eric Young, Hammerstone, and John Skyler to win. Hendry pinned Myers, forcing Myers to wear a turkey suit.

=== Tenryu Project ===
Accomplishment	Winner(s)	Date	Notes
Ryūkon Cup	Hideyoshi Kamitani	November 23	Defeated Hikaru Sato in the final to win.

=== West Coast Pro ===
Accomplishment	Winner(s)	Date	Notes
Biff Wiff's Cosmic Gumbo Rumbo	Beef	April 14	Last eliminated Serpentico to win.
Dennis Richmond Invitational Tournament	Jiah Jewell	June 29	Defeated Loverboy Leo in the final to win.
Queen of Indies	Hyan	August 17	Defeated Masha Slamovich in the final to win.
King of Indies	Titus Alexander	November 16	Defeated Calvin Tankman in the final to win.

=== WOS ===
Accomplishment	Winner(s)	Date	Notes
WOS Championship #1 Contender's Battle Royal	Adam Maxted	September 14	Last eliminated Grado to compete for the vacant WOS Championship match. He wrestled Sha Samuels for the title but was unsuccessful.
WOS Women's Championship Tournament	Alex Windsor	September 14	Defeated LA Taylor in the final to win the vacant title.

=== WOW ===
Accomplishment	Winner(s)	Date	Notes
WOW World Championship Battle Royal	The Classmaster	August 3 (aired January 11, 2025)	Last eliminated Tormenta to win the vacant WOW World Championship.

=== wXw ===
Accomplishment	Winner(s)	Date	Notes
Road to 16 Carat Gold Tournament	Icarus and Elijah Blum	February 10	Defeated Maggot and Yoichi to win the A Block and B Block, respectively, to qualify for the 16 Carat Gold Tournament.
Ambition 15	Axel Tischer	March 9	Defeated Thomas Shire in the final to win.
16 Carat Gold Tournament	Laurance Roman	March 10	Defeated Peter Tihanyi in the final to earn a wXw Unified World Wrestling Championship match. He defeated Robert Dreissker in a lumberjack match to win the title at Drive of Champions.
wXw European Championship Tournament	Aigle Blanc	July 20	Defeated Mike D Vecchio in the final to become the inaugural champion.
Shortcut to the Top match	Peter Tihanyi	August 10	Last eliminated Elijah Blum to earn a wXw Unified World Wrestling Championship match. He defeated champion Laurance Roman and Robert Dreissker in a three-way match to win the title on Night 2 of the World Tag Team Festival.
Femme Fatales	Anita Vaughan	October 6	Defeated Debbie Keitel in the final to earn a wXw Shotgun Championship match. She defeated Levaniel to win the title on Night 3 of the World Tag Team Festival.
World Tag Team Festival	Young Blood (Oskar Leube and Yuto Nakashima)	October 6	Won the wXw World Tag Team Championship after defeating champions KXS (Axel Tischer and Fast Time Moodo) and 1 Called Manders and Thomas Shire in the final, which was a three-way elimination tag team match.
Christmas Academy Cup	Jane Nero	December 4	Defeated Madison Marley, Tea Jane Watson, and Violet Nyte in a four-way match to win.
Over the Mistletoe Gauntlet match	Alpha Kevin	December 4	Last eliminated Danny Fray to win.

=== XPW ===
Accomplishment	Winner(s)	Date	Notes
Hellsgate Gauntlet match	Homeless Jimmy	February 25	Last eliminated Mickie Knuckles to win the vacant XPW King of the Deathmatch Championship.

=== Zero1 ===
==== Zero1 Japan ====
Accomplishment	Winner(s)	Date	Notes
Fire Festival	Tsugutaka Sato	July 28 (aired August 11)	Defeated Koji Doi in the final to win.
Junior Tag Tournament	Takumi Baba and Takuya Sugawara	July 28 (aired August 11)	Defeated Seiki Yoshioka and Yusuke Kodama to win the Albuquerque Cup Trophy.

=== WWE ===
Accomplishment	Winner(s)	Date	Notes
NXT Breakout Tournament (Men)	Oba Femi	January 2	Defeated Riley Osborne in the final to earn a men's NXT championship match of his choosing. He would invoke his contract to win the NXT North American Championship from Dragon Lee on the January 9 episode of NXT.
WWE United States Championship #1 Contender Tournament	Kevin Owens	January 5	Defeated Santos Escobar in the final to earn a WWE United States Championship match at the Royal Rumble. He challenged Logan Paul for the title but was unsuccessful in winning it.
NXT Women's Championship #1 Contender's Battle Royal	Roxanne Perez	January 16	Defeated Fallon Henley, Kelani Jordan, and Kiana James in a fatal four-way match final to earn an NXT Women's Championship match at NXT Vengeance Day. She unsuccessfully challenged Lyra Valkyria for the title at the event in a three-way match that also involved Lola Vice, who cashed in her NXT Breakout Tournament contract to enter the match.
Royal Rumble match (Women)	Bayley	January 27	Last eliminated Liv Morgan to earn a women's world championship match at WrestleMania XL. She won as a SmackDown wrestler and challenged, and defeated, Iyo Sky for SmackDown's WWE Women's Championship.
Royal Rumble match (Men)	Cody Rhodes	January 27	Last eliminated CM Punk to earn a men's world championship match at WrestleMania XL. Rhodes would become the first person since Stone Cold Steve Austin in 1997 and 1998 to win consecutive Royal Rumble matches. He won as a Raw wrestler but challenged, and defeated, Roman Reigns in a Bloodline Rules match for SmackDown's Undisputed WWE Universal Championship.
Dusty Rhodes Tag Team Classic (Men)	Baron Corbin and Bron Breakker	February 4	Defeated Carmelo Hayes and Trick Williams in the final to earn an NXT Tag Team Championship match. They would defeat The D'Angelo Family (Tony D'Angelo and Channing "Stacks" Lorenzo) to win the titles on the February 13 episode of NXT.
Undisputed WWE Tag Team Championship Contender Series	New Catch Republic (Pete Dunne and Tyler Bate)	February 9	Defeated #DIY (Johnny Gargano and Tommaso Ciampa) in the final to earn an Undisputed WWE Tag Team Championship match at Elimination Chamber: Perth. They challenged The Judgment Day (Finn Bálor and Damian Priest) for the titles at the event but were unsuccessful.
Elimination Chamber (Women)	Becky Lynch	February 24	Defeated Naomi, Tiffany Stratton, Raquel Rodriguez, Bianca Belair, and Liv Morgan, who she last eliminated, as a Raw wrestler to earn a match for her own brand's Women's World Championship at WrestleMania XL. She challenged Rhea Ripley for the title on Night 1 of the event but was unsuccessful.
Elimination Chamber (Men)	Drew McIntyre	February 24	Defeated Bobby Lashley, LA Knight, Kevin Owens, Logan Paul, and Randy Orton, who he last eliminated, as a Raw wrestler to earn a match for his own brand's World Heavyweight Championship at WrestleMania XL. He would defeat Seth "Freakin" Rollins on Night 2 of the event to win the title.
WWE Intercontinental Championship #1 Contender's Gauntlet Match	Sami Zayn	March 11	Last eliminated Chad Gable to earn a WWE Intercontinental Championship match at WrestleMania XL. He defeated Gunther to win the title at the event.
WrestleMania XL Six-Pack Ladder Match SmackDown Qualifier Tournament	New Catch Republic (Pete Dunne and Tyler Bate) and A-Town Down Under (Austin Theory and Grayson Waller)	March 29	Defeated Legado del Fantasma (Angel and Berto) and The Street Profits (Montez Ford and Angelo Dawkins) to win the first and second brackets, respectively, to qualify for the Undisputed WWE Tag Team Championship ladder match at WrestleMania XL. A-Town Down Under would secure the WWE SmackDown Tag Team Championship while The Awesome Truth (R-Truth and The Miz) would secure the WWE Raw Tag Team Championship.
NXT Tag Team Championship Eliminator Tournament	Axiom and Nathan Frazer	April 2	Defeated Latino World Order (Joaquin Wilde and Cruz Del Toro) and The O.C. (Luke Gallows and Karl Anderson) to earn an NXT Tag Team Championship match at NXT Stand & Deliver. They challenged The Wolf Dogs (Baron Corbin and Bron Breakker) for the titles at the event but were unsuccessful.
André the Giant Memorial Battle Royal	Bronson Reed	April 5	Last eliminated Ivar to win the André the Giant Memorial Trophy.
Undisputed WWE Championship Eliminator Tournament	AJ Styles	April 19	Defeated LA Knight in the final to earn an Undisputed WWE Championship match at Backlash France. He challenged Cody Rhodes for the title at the event but was unsuccessful.
Women's World Championship Battle Royal	Becky Lynch	April 22	Last eliminated Liv Morgan to win the vacant Women's World Championship.
WWE Speed Championship Tournament	Ricochet	April 26 (aired May 3)	Defeated Johnny Gargano in the final to become the inaugural WWE Speed Champion.
WWE Speed Championship #1 Contender's Tournament	Tyler Bate	May 17 (aired May 22)	Defeated Apollo Crews in the final to earn a WWE Speed Championship match. He challenged Ricochet for the title on the May 20 episode of WWE Speed, which aired on May 24, but was unsuccessful.
Queen of the Ring tournament	Nia Jax	May 25	Defeated Lyra Valkyria in the final to be crowned Queen of the Ring and also earned a women's world championship match at SummerSlam. She won as a SmackDown wrestler and defeated Bayley to win the WWE Women's Championship at the event.
King of the Ring tournament	Gunther	May 25	Defeated Randy Orton in the final to be crowned King of the Ring and also earned a men's world championship match at SummerSlam. He won as a Raw wrestler and defeated Damian Priest to win the World Heavyweight Championship at the event.
WWE Speed Championship #1 Contender's Tournament	Andrade	June 7 (aired June 12)	Defeated Tommaso Ciampa in the final to earn a WWE Speed Championship match. He defeated Ricochet to win the title on the June 7 WWE Speed tapings, which aired on June 14.
NXT Championship #1 Contender's Battle Royal	Je'Von Evans	June 18	Last eliminated Shawn Spears to earn an NXT Championship match at NXT Heatwave. He challenged Trick Williams for the title in a fatal four-way match that also involved Spears and Ethan Page, the latter of whom pinned Evans to win the title.
NXT Tag Team Championship #1 Contender's Tag Team Turmoil	Chase University (Andre Chase and Duke Hudson)	June 25	Last eliminated New Catch Republic (Pete Dunne and Tyler Bate) to earn a NXT Tag Team Championship match at NXT Heatwave. They challenged Axiom and Nathan Frazer for the titles at the event, but were unsuccessful.
WWE Speed Championship #1 Contender's Tournament	Xavier Woods	June 28 (aired July 3)	Defeated Nathan Frazer in the final for a WWE Speed Championship match. He challenged Andrade for the title at the June 28 WWE Speed tapings, which aired on July 5, but was unsuccessful.
Money in the Bank ladder match (Women)	Tiffany Stratton	July 6	Defeated Iyo Sky, Chelsea Green, Lyra Valkyria, Naomi, and Zoey Stark in a six-woman ladder match for a women's championship match contract. She subsequently cashed in on the WWE Women's Championship and won the title from Nia Jax on the January 3, 2025 episode of SmackDown.
Money in the Bank ladder match (Men)	Drew McIntyre	July 6	Defeated Jey Uso, Carmelo Hayes, Andrade, Chad Gable, and LA Knight in a six-man ladder match for a men's championship match contract. He cashed in during the World Heavyweight Championship match between Damian Priest and Seth "Freakin" Rollins on the same night but was unsuccessful in winning the title.
WWE Speed Championship #1 Contender's Tournament	Baron Corbin	July 12 (aired July 17)	Won via default to earn a WWE Speed Championship match. He challenged Andrade for the title at the July 19 WWE Speed taping, which aired on July 24, but was unsuccessful.
WWE Tag Team Championship #1 Contender's Gauntlet Match	The Bloodline (Tama Tonga and Jacob Fatu)	July 19 (aired July 26)	Last eliminated The Street Profits (Angelo Dawkins and Montez Ford) to earn a WWE Tag Team Championship match. They defeated #DIY (Johnny Gargano and Tommaso Ciampa) to win the titles on the August 2 episode of SmackDown.
WWE Tag Team Championship #1 Contender Tournament	The Street Profits (Angelo Dawkins and Montez Ford)	August 16	Defeated #DIY (Johnny Gargano and Tommaso Ciampa) to earn a WWE Tag Team Championship match. They challenged The Bloodline (Tama Tonga and Tonga Loa) for the titles on the August 23 episode of SmackDown, but were unsuccessful.
WWE Speed Championship #1 Contender's Tournament	Pete Dunne	August 16 (aired August 23)	Defeated Je'Von Evans in the final to earn a WWE Speed Championship match. He challenged Andrade for the title at the August 23 WWE Speed tapings, which aired on August 30, but was unsuccessful.
No Mercy Gauntlet Eliminator	Jaida Parker	August 20	Last eliminated Sol Ruca to earn an NXT Women's Championship match at NXT No Mercy. She challenged Roxanne Perez for the title at the event, but was unsuccessful.
WWE Intercontinental Championship #1 Contender Tournament	Jey Uso	September 9	Defeated Pete Dunne, Ilja Dragunov, and Braun Strowman to earn a future WWE Intercontinental Championship match. He defeated Bron Breakker to win the title on the September 23 episode of Raw.
WWE Women's Speed Championship Tournament	Candice LeRae	October 4 (aired October 9)	Defeated Iyo Sky in the final to become the inaugural champion.
WWE Tag Team Championship #1 Contender Tournament	Motor City Machine Guns (Alex Shelley and Chris Sabin)	October 25	Defeated #DIY (Johnny Gargano and Tommaso Ciampa) in the final to earn a WWE Tag Team Championship match. They defeated The Bloodline (Tama Tonga and Tonga Loa) to win the titles on the same night.
World Tag Team Championship #1 Contender Tournament	War Raiders (Erik and Ivar)	October 28	Defeated The New Day (Kofi Kingston and Xavier Woods) and Latino World Order (Rey Mysterio and Dragon Lee) in the final to earn a World Tag Team Championship match. They challenged The Judgment Day (Finn Bálor and JD McDonagh) for the titles on the November 25 episode of Raw, but were unsuccessful.
WWE Women's Crown Jewel Championship	Liv Morgan	November 2	Defeated SmackDown's WWE Women's Champion Nia Jax to win the Women's Crown Jewel Championship. Morgan was Raw's Women's World Champion.
WWE Crown Jewel Championship	Cody Rhodes	November 2	Defeated Raw's Women's World Champion Gunther to win the Crown Jewel Championship. Rhodes was SmackDown's Undisputed WWE Champion.
Women's World Championship #1 Contender's Battle Royal	Iyo Sky	November 3 (aired November 4)	Last eliminated Lyra Valkyria to earn a Women's World Championship match. She challenged Liv Morgan for the title at Saturday Night's Main Event XXXVII but was unsuccessful.
WWE Speed Championship #1 Contender's Tournament	Dragon Lee	November 8 (aired November 13)	Won by default to earn a WWE Speed Championship match. He defeated Andrade to win the title at the November 15 WWE Speed taping, which aired on November 20.
NXT Tag Team Championship #1 Contender's Battle Royal	No Quarter Catch Crew (Myles Borne and Tavion Heights)	December 3	Borne last eliminated Lucien Price of OTM to earn his team an NXT Tag Team Championship match at NXT Deadline. They challenged Nathan Frazer and Axiom for the titles at the event but were unsuccessful.
Iron Survivor Challenge (Women)	Giulia	December 7	Defeated Sol Ruca, Stephanie Vaquer, Wren Sinclair, and Zaria to earn an NXT Women's Championship match at NXT: New Year's Evil. She defeated Roxanne Perez to win the title at the event.
Iron Survivor Challenge (Men)	Oba Femi	December 7	Defeated Ethan Page, Je'Von Evans, Nathan Frazer, and Wes Lee to earn an NXT Championship match at NXT: New Year's Evil. He defeated champion Trick Williams and Eddy Thorpe in a triple threat match to win the title at the event.
WWE Women's United States Championship Tournament	Chelsea Green	December 14	Defeated Michin in the final to become the inaugural WWE Women's United States Champion.
WWE Women's Speed Championship #1 Contender's Tournament	Natalya	December 27 (aired January 1, 2025)	Defeated Michin in the final to earn a WWE Women's Speed Championship match. She challenged Candice LeRae for the title at the January 3, 2025 WWE Speed taping, which aired on January 8, but it ended in a time limit draw.

== Title changes ==
=== 2AW ===
2AW Openweight Championship
Incoming champion – Takuro Niki
Date	Winner	Event/Show	Note(s)
June 23	Taishi Takizawa	2AW 5th Anniversary ~ Grand Slam in TKP Garden City Chiba	
August 25	Ayato Yoshida	Grand Slam in TKP Garden City Chiba	

2AW Tag Team Championship
Incoming champions – MJ2 (Kengo Mashimo and Naka Shuma)
Date	Winner	Event/Show	Note(s)
August 25	Starlight Dreamers (Ayame Sasamura and Kotaro Yoshino)	Grand Slam in TKP Garden City Chiba	
October 27	Buttobe Missile Kickers (Daiju Wakamatsu and Taishi Takizawa)	Grand Slam in TKP Garden City Chiba	

=== AAA ===
AAA Mega Championship
Incoming champion – El Hijo del Vikingo
Date	Winner	Event/Show	Note(s)
March 16	Vacated	–	El Hijo del Vikingo relinquished the title due to suffering a knee injury.
April 27	Nic Nemeth	Triplemanía XXXII: Monterrey	Defeated Alberto El Patrón to win the vacant title.
August 17	Alberto El Patrón	Triplemanía XXXII: Mexico City	

AAA World Cruiserweight Championship
Incoming champion – Komander
Date	Winner	Event/Show	Note(s)
August 17	Matt Riddle	Triplemanía XXXII: Mexico City	This was a three-way match also involving Laredo Kid.
December 7	Laredo Kid	Cierre de la Gira Origenes	

AAA Latin American Championship
Incoming champion – Octagón Jr.
Date	Winner	Event/Show	Note(s)
November 10	El Mesías	Guerra de Titanes	

La Leyenda Azul Blue Demon Championship
Incoming champion – Arez
Date	Winner	Event/Show	Note(s)
February 28	Vacated	–	Arez vacated the title after leaving AAA.
February 28	Deactivated	—	The championship was abandoned.

AAA Reina de Reinas Championship
Incoming champion – Flammer
No title changes.

AAA World Tag Team Championship
Incoming champions – Nueva Generación Dinamita (Forastero and Sansón)
Date	Winner	Event/Show	Note(s)
June 11	La Dinistia Casas-Alverado (Psycho Clown and Negro Casas)	AAA Orígenes	
August 17	Team India (Satnam Singh and Raj Dhesi)	Triplemanía XXXII: Mexico City	This was a three-way tag team match also involving La Dinistia Wagner (Dr. Wagner Jr. and Galeno del Mal).

AAA World Mixed Tag Team Championship
Incoming champions – Abismo Negro Jr. and Lady Flammer
Date	Winner	Event/Show	Note(s)
October 6	Decay (Crazzy Steve and Havok)	Héroes Inmortales XVI	
December 8 (aired February 3)	Mr. Iguana and La Hiedra	Cierre de la Gira Origenes	

AAA World Trios Championship
Incoming champions – Los Vipers (Abismo Negro Jr., Psicosis, El Fiscal, and Toxín)
On February 28, Toxín left AAA, although he was still recognized as one-third of the AAA World Trios Champions.
Date	Winner	Event/Show	Note(s)
November 17	Los Psycho Circus (Psycho Clown, Murder Clown, Panic Clown, and Dave the Clown)	Orígenes Saltillo	Murder Clown, Panic Clown, and Dave the Clwon defeated Abismo Negro Jr., Psicosis, and El Fiscal, who substituted in for Toxín, in a Steel Cage match. Psycho Clown was later recognized as champion under the Freebird Rule.

=== AEW ===
AEW World Championship
Incoming champion – Samoa Joe
Date	Winner	Event/Show	Note(s)
April 21	Swerve Strickland	Dynasty	
August 25	Bryan Danielson	All In	This was a Title vs. Career match.
October 12	Jon Moxley	WrestleDream	

AEW Women's World Championship
Incoming champion – "Timeless" Toni Storm
Date	Winner	Event/Show	Note(s)
August 25	Mariah May	All In	

AEW International Championship
Incoming champion – Orange Cassidy
Date	Winner	Event/Show	Note(s)
March 3	Roderick Strong	Revolution	
May 26	Will Ospreay	Double or Nothing	
July 17	MJF	Dynamite: 250	On July 24, MJF unofficially rebranded the title as the AEW American Championship.
August 25	Will Ospreay	All In	Upon winning back the title, it was restored as the AEW International Championship.
October 12	Konosuke Takeshita	WrestleDream	This was a three-way match, also involving Ricochet.

AEW Continental Championship
Incoming champion – Eddie Kingston
Date	Winner	Event/Show	Note(s)
March 20	Kazuchika Okada	Dynamite	

AEW TNT Championship
Incoming champion – Christian Cage
Date	Winner	Event/Show	Note(s)
March 20	Adam Copeland	Dynamite / Rampage	This was an "I Quit" match. The match started as the main event of Dynamite but concluded on Rampage, which aired back-to-back.
May 29	Vacated	Dynamite	AEW executive vice presidents The Young Bucks (Matthew Jackson and Nicholas Jackson) stripped Adam Copeland of the title due to a legitimate leg injury that he suffered during his title defense at Double or Nothing three days prior.
June 30	Jack Perry	Forbidden Door	Defeated Konosuke Takeshita, Mark Briscoe, Dante Martin, Lio Rush, and El Phantasmo in a six-way ladder match to win the vacant title.
November 23	Daniel Garcia	Full Gear	

AEW TBS Championship
Incoming champion – Julia Hart
Date	Winner	Event/Show	Note(s)
April 21	Willow Nightingale	Dynasty	This was a House Rules match. Nightingale's "House Rules" stipulation was that Skye Blue and Kris Statlander were barred from ringside.
May 26	Mercedes Moné	Double or Nothing	

AEW World Tag Team Championship
Incoming champions – Ricky Starks and Big Bill
Date	Winner	Event/Show	Note(s)
February 7	Sting and Darby Allin	Dynamite	This was a tornado tag team match.
March 3	Vacated	Revolution	The title was vacated due to Sting's retirement.
April 21	The Young Bucks (Matthew Jackson and Nicholas Jackson)	Dynasty	This was a tournament final ladder match for the vacant titles, in which The Young Bucks defeated FTR (Dax Harwood and Cash Wheeler) to win.
October 30	Private Party (Isiah Kassidy and Marq Quen)	Fright Night Dynamite	Had Private Party lost, they would have had to disband as a team.

AEW World Trios Championship
Incoming champions – The Acclaimed (Anthony Bowens, Max Caster, and Billy Gunn)
Date	Winner	Event/Show	Note(s)
April 21	Bullet Club Gold / The Bang Bang Gang (Jay White, Austin Gunn, and Colten Gunn)	Dynasty; Zero Hour	This was a winners take all championship unification match also for Bullet Club Gold's ROH World Six-Man Tag Team Championship. During this reign, the group was renamed to The Bang Bang Gang.
From April 21 until July 10 (aired July 13), the AEW World Trios Championship and the ROH World Six-Man Tag Team Championship were held and defended together as the Unified World Trios Championship.
July 10 (aired July 13)	Vacated	Collision	The Bang Bang Gang (Jay White, Austin Gunn, and Colten Gunn) were stripped of the Unified World Trios Championship by interim AEW Executive Vice President Christopher Daniels after White suffered an injury and denied Bang Bang Gang's attempt to invoke the Freebird Rule to allow Juice Robinson to defend the title in place of White. This subsequently ended the unification with the ROH World Six-Man Tag Team Championship.
July 20	The Patriarchy (Christian Cage, Killswitch, and Nick Wayne)	Collision	Defeated The Bang Bang Gang (Juice Robinson, Austin Gunn, and Colten Gunn) to win the vacant title.
August 25	Blackpool Combat Club / The Death Riders (Pac, Claudio Castagnoli, and Wheeler Yuta)	All In	This was a four-way London Ladder match also involving The Bang Bang Gang (Juice Robinson, Austin Gunn, and Colten Gunn) and House of Black (Malakai Black, Brody King, and Buddy Matthews). Pac would subsequently become a member of the Blackpool Combat Club. On November 6, the group was renamed to The Death Riders.

FTW Championship
Incoming champion – Hook
Title not officially sanctioned by AEW.
Date	Winner	Event/Show	Note(s)
April 21	Chris Jericho	Dynasty	This was an FTW Rules match.
August 25	Hook	All In	This was a Last Chance match contested under FTW Rules. Had Hook lost, he would have never been able to challenge for the title again for as long as Chris Jericho was champion.
September 25	Retired	Dynamite: Grand Slam	Following Hook's defense of the title at the event, he announced the championship's retirement.

=== AJPW ===
Triple Crown Heavyweight Championship
Incoming champion – Katsuhiko Nakajima
Date	Winner	Event/Show	Note(s)
March 30	Yuma Anzai	Dream Power Series; Night 5	
August 17	Yuma Aoyagi	Summer Action Wars	
November 4	Davey Boy Smith Jr.	Giant Series; Night 8	
December 31	Jun Saito	New Year's Eve	

World Tag Team Championship
Incoming champions – Voodoo Murders (Jun Saito and Rei Saito)
Date	Winner	Event/Show	Note(s)
February 11	Vacated	–	Titles were vacated after Rei Saito suffered a shoulder injury.
February 25	Hideki Suzuki and Suwama	Excite Series; Night 4	Defeated Zennichi Shin Jidai (Kento Miyahara and Yuma Aoyagi) to win the vacant title.
March 30	Voodoo Murders (Jun Saito and Rei Saito)	Dream Power Series; Night 5	

World Junior Heavyweight Championship
Incoming champion – Dan Tamura
Date	Winner	Event/Show	Note(s)
March 9	Rising Hayato	Dream Power Series; Night 1	
July 13	Naruki Doi	Summer Action Series; Night 1	

All Asia Tag Team Championship
Incoming champions – Eruption (Hideki Okatani and Yukio Sakaguchi)
Date	Winner	Event/Show	Note(s)
January 14 (aired January 17)	Atsushi Onita and Toy Kojima	DDT New Year's Current Blast!	This was a DDT Pro-Wrestling show.
March 30	Dan Tamura and Hikaru Sato	Dream Power Series; Night 5	
June 24	Musashi and Seiki Yoshioka	Dynamite Series; Night 1	
October 13	ELPIDA (Yuma Anzai and Rising Hayato)	Raising an Army Memorial Series; Night 2	

Gaora TV Championship
Incoming champion – Minoru Tanaka
Date	Winner	Event/Show	Note(s)
January 2	Black Menso-re	New Year Giant Series; Night 1	
January 14	Seigo Tachibana	New Year Giant Series; Night 3	
June 24	Fuminori Abe	Dynamite Series; Night 1	
October 22	Seigo Tachibana	Raising an Army Memorial Series; Night 4	
December 8	Yuko Miyamoto	Real World Tag League; Night 11	

AJPW TV Six-Man Tag Team Championship
Incoming champions – Suwama, Mayumi Ozaki and Maya Yukihi
Date	Winner	Event/Show	Note(s)
July 18	Shuji Ishikawa and Team 200kg (Chihiro Hashimoto and Yuu)	Evolution Vol. 19	This was an Evolution Joshi Pro-Wrestling event.
October 23	Hokuto-gun (Hokuto Omori, Kumaarashi, and Cyrus)	Evolution Vol. 25	This was an Evolution Joshi Pro-Wrestling event.

=== BJW ===
BJW Deathmatch Heavyweight Championship
Incoming champion – Mad Man Pondo
Date	Winner	Event/Show	Note(s)
January 4	Yuki Ishikawa	Deathmatch King Death	This was a Lighttubes Deathmatch.
April 14	Hideyoshi Kamitani	New Standard Big "B" ~ Feelin' Come; Night 2	This was a High Pressure Deathmatch.

BJW World Strong Heavyweight Championship
Incoming champion – Yuya Aoki
Date	Winner	Event/Show	Note(s)
October 14 (airing October 22)	Hideyoshi Kamitani	New Standard Big "B" ~ Keep Rolling; Night 2	

BJW Tag Team Championship
Incoming champions – Crazy Lovers (Masashi Takeda and Takumi Tsukamoto)
Date	Winner	Event/Show	Note(s)
June 9	Hideyoshi Kamitani and Isami Kodaka	BJW	This was a Crazy Scattered Deathmatch.
August 12	Masaya Takahashi and Sagat	BJW	This was a Concrete Block & Giga Ladder Deathmatch.
October 29	Baka Gaijin (Dale Patricks and Madman Pondo)	BJW	This was a Fluorescent Light Tubes Street Fight Deathmatch.

BJW Junior Heavyweight Championship
Incoming champion – Ender Kara
Date	Winner	Event/Show	Note(s)
May 4	Kota Sekifuda	Endless Survivor ~ Beyond the Milestone	
August 12	Ikuto Hidaka	BJW	

Yokohama Shopping Street 6-Man Tag Team Championship
Incoming champions – Kazumi Kikuta, Yasufumi Nakanoue, and Yuya Aoki
Date	Winner	Event/Show	Note(s)
January 11	Masaki Morihiro and Okami (Daichi Hashimoto and Hideyoshi Kamitani)	BJW	
March 31	Kankuro Hoshino, Kengo Takai, and Kenta Kosugi	Death Market 78	
May 26	Daisuke Sekimoto, Kazumi Kikuta, and Yasufumi Nakanoue	Death Market 79	

UWA World Tag Team Championship
Incoming champions – Speed of Sounds (Tsutomu Oosugi and Hercules Senga)
Date	Winner	Event/Show	Note(s)
March 10	Tomato Kaji and Kota Sekifuda	Osaka Surprise 71 ~ Shikyosotei no Jin	
September 11	Aijin Tag (Masato Kamino and Takato Nakano)	BASARA Tsukamoto & Nakatsu Anniversary Festival	This was a Pro-Wrestling Basara event.
October 22	Hideyoshi Kamitani and Isami Kodaka	BASARA 259 ~ Utage	This was a Pro-Wrestling Basara event.

=== CF ===
– DDT Pro-Wrestling
– Pro Wrestling Noah
– Tokyo Joshi Pro-Wrestling
– Ganbare Pro-Wrestling

==== DDT ====
KO-D Openweight Championship
Incoming champion – Yuki Ueno
Date	Winner	Event/Show	Note(s)
August 25	Shinya Aoki	Summer Vacation Memories	
October 4	Chris Brookes	Sumida Dramatic Dream!	

DDT Universal Championship
Incoming champion – Mao
Date	Winner	Event/Show	Note(s)
September 8	Yuki Iino	Friendship, Effort & Victory in Nagoya	Cashed in his Right to Challenge Anytime, Anywhere contract.
October 20	Mao	God Bless DDT	Cashed in his Right to Challenge Anytime, Anywhere contract.
November 9	Miyu Yamashita	DDT in Utero	This was a three-way match also involving Mike Bailey. Yamashita would become the first woman to hold the championship.
November 10	Gringo Loco	DDT x TJPW x DEFY Trianger DTD	This was a three-way match also involving Nick Wayne.

DDT Extreme Championship
Incoming champion – Kazuki Hirata
Date	Winner	Event/Show	Note(s)
January 28	Shunma Katsumata	Sweet Dreams!	This was a "Who is The Fated One?" Toy Kojima Challenge Deathmatch.
September 29	Akito	Dramatic Infinity	This was an Ippon Light Tube tag team deathmatch in which Akito teamed up with Yuni to defeat Katsumata and Kazuma Sumi. Akito pinned Katsumata to win the match and the title subsequently.
October 20	Danshoku Dino	God Bless DDT	This was a nobodyknows+ rules match.

KO-D Tag Team Championship
Incoming champions – Romance Dawn (Soma Takao and Shota)
Date	Winner	Event/Show	Note(s)
January 21	Damnation T.A (Daisuke Sasaki and Kanon)	Sweet Dreams! Tour in Shinagawa	
February 8	Burning (Tetsuya Endo and Yuki Iino)	Into The Fight Tour in Shinjuku	
August 10	Schadenfreude International (Chris Brookes and Takeshi Masada)	Osaka vs. Tokyo – Dream East West Pro Wrestling Battle	
September 20	ShunMao (Mao and Shunma Katsumata)	Dramatic Denshi Ticket in Shinjuku	
November 21	Vacated	–	Titles vacated after Katsumata was diagnosed with a torn anterior ligament.
December 28	The37Kamiina (Mao and To-y)	Ultimate Party	Defeated Burning (Tetsuya Endo and Yuya Koroku) to win the vacant titles.

KO-D 6-Man Tag Team Championship
Incoming champions – D・O・A (Jun Akiyama, Danshoku Dino and Makoto Oishi)
Date	Winner	Event/Show	Note(s)
April 26	Damnation T.A. (Daisuke Sasaki, Kanon, and MJ Paul)	DDT X Zeekstar Tokyo Special Performance ~ DDZT	
June 5	Smile Squash (Akito, Harashima, and Yasu Urano)	What Are You Doing? Tour in Shinjuku	
July 21	Damnation T.A. (Daisuke Sasaki, Kanon, and MJ Paul)	Wrestle Peter Pan	This was an elimination four-way tag team match also involving Aja Kong and The37Kamiina (Shunma Katsumata and To-y), and Schadenfreude International (Antonio Honda, Masahiro Takanashi and Takeshi Masada). Damnation T.A. last eliminated the former team to win the titles.

KO-D 10-Man Tag Team Championship
Incoming champions – The37Kamiina (Mao, Shinya Aoki, Shunma Katsumata, Toi Kojima, and Yuki Ueno)
Date	Winner	Event/Show	Note(s)
January 5	Takayuki Ueki, Mecha Mummy, and Schadenfreude International (Masahiro Takanashi, Antonio Honda, and Takeshi Masada)	Sweet Dreams! Tour in Shinjuku	Yuni and Yoshihiko replaced Aoki and Mao who were unable to compete.
October 22	Keigo Nakamura, Yuki Ishida, To-y, Kazuma Sumi, and Yuya Koroku	Pro Wrestling Festival in Ikebukuro Full Moon Festival	Munetetsu Nakamura replaced Honda who was unable to compete.

O-40 Championship
Incoming champion – Makoto Oishi
Date	Winner	Event/Show	Note(s)
March 19	Vacated	–	Oishi was stripped of the title due to a lack of title defenses.
April 13 (aired April 16)	Azul Dragon	Dramatic Dream Tour in Fukuoka	Defeated Makoto Oishi to win the vacant title.
October 13 (aired October 16)	Toru Owashi	God Bless DDT Tour in Fukuoka	This was a three-way match also involving Danshoku Dino

World Ōmori Championship
Incoming champion – Soma Takao
Date	Winner	Event/Show	Note(s)
November 10	Masahiro Takanashi	Utan Festa	

Ironman Heavymetalweight Championship
Incoming champion – Christmas tree
Date	Winner	Event/Show	Note(s)
January 3	Kuroshio Tokyo Japan	D-Oh Grand Prix Finals	
January 7	Stefan	Unagi Sayaka Produce Tono Wa Goranshin ~ 1-Ban Venus	Unagi Sayaka's stuffed dinosaur toy. Pinned Kuroshio on hallways.
January 7	Unagi Sayaka	Unagi Sayaka Produce Tono Wa Goranshin ~ 1-Ban Venus	Pinned Stefan who was brought in the ring by Itsuki Aoki.
January 28	Haruka Umesaki	Diana	Defeated Unagi Sayaka in a match which was contested for Umesaki's World Woman Pro-Wrestling Diana World Championship.
January 28	Unagi Sayaka	Diana	Pinned Umesaki in the ring.
February 23	Minoru Fujita	N/A	Pinned Sayaka in the hallways of the Yokohama Radiant Hall after a Ganbare Pro-Wrestling event.
February 23	Unagi Sayaka	N/A	Pinned Fujita in the hallways of a hotel.
February 25	Saki	CMLL Lucha Fiesta	This was a Consejo Mundial de Lucha Libre event.
February 25	Hikari Shimizu	CMLL Lucha Fiesta	This was a Consejo Mundial de Lucha Libre event. Shimizu tickled Saki into submission.
February 25	Makoto	CMLL Lucha Fiesta	This was a Consejo Mundial de Lucha Libre event.
February 25	Mrs. Mastuzawa	CMLL Lucha Fiesta	Makoto's manager. This was a Consejo Mundial de Lucha Libre event.
February 25	Unagi Sayaka	CMLL Lucha Fiesta	This was a Consejo Mundial de Lucha Libre event.
March 10	Maya Yukihi	Oz Academy Sweet Dreams	This was an Oz Academy event. This was a six-woman tag team match in which Unagi Sayaka teamed up with Itsuki Aoki and Momoka Hanazono against Ozaki-gun (Kakeru, Maya Yukihi and Saori Anou). Sayaka succumbed to Yukihi via pinfall.
March 10	Lasso	N/A	Unagi Sayaka pushed Yukihi's lasso down so it could pin her for the title while she was sleeping backstage after Sweet Dreams.
March 10	Momoka Hanazono	N/A	Pinned Yukihi's lasso after the latter left it unattended.
March 10	Unagi Sayaka	N/A	Pinned Hanazono in an elevator.
March 23	Sparky Ballard	West Coast Pro Marvelous Coast	Referee. This was a West Coast Pro Wrestling event.
March 23	Ref Gil	West Coast Pro Marvelous Coast	Referee. This was a West Coast Pro Wrestling event.
March 23	Hyan	West Coast Pro Marvelous Coast	This was a West Coast Pro Wrestling event.
March 23	Unagi Sayaka	West Coast Pro Marvelous Coast	This was a West Coast Pro Wrestling event.
March 29	Unknown foreigner	N/A	On April 12, Unagi Sayaka revealed that she had lost the title to a stranger in the United States sometime before her match against Janai Kai at MLW War Chamber.
March 29	Unagi Sayaka	N/A	Sayaka won the title back after her MLW match.
April 14	Punch Tahara	Sendai Girls	Referee and ring announcer. Submitted Sayaka to a hug to win the title
April 14	Unagi Sayaka	Sendai Girls	Pinned Tahara backstage.
April 19	Grilled eel	N/A	Sanshiro Takagi strangled Sayaka with a store-bought packed grilled eel somewhere backstage. Sayaka tapped out to the item.
April 19	Unagi Sayaka	N/A	Sayaka strangled Takagi with the same grilled eel during a press conference to which the latter submitted to. Sayaka later ate the eel as compensation.
April 26	Sanshiro Takagi	DDT X Zeekstar Tokyo Special Performance ~ DDZT	
April 26	Unagi Sayaka	DDT X Zeekstar Tokyo Special Performance ~ DDZT	Pinned Takagi after the match.
April 26	Sanshiro Takagi	DDT X Zeekstar Tokyo Special Performance ~ DDZT	Takagi, who wore Sayaka's gear for the matches, endorsed Sayaka and as they made their way backstage, Takagi rolled up Sayaka on the entrance ramp.
April 26	Zeestar	DDT X Zeekstar Tokyo Special Performance ~ DDZT	Zeestar Tokyo's mascot. DDT and the Zeekstar Tokyo handball team held a few challenges in the arena. Still in his Unagi costume, Takagi was encouraged to play goalie for a game of handball, where the Zeekstar team shot multiple balls at him. He was left beaten and lying on the ground, so Zeestar pinned him.
April 26	Pokotan	DDT X Zeekstar Tokyo Special Performance ~ DDZT	
April 26–June 8	Undocumented	N/A	The history of the championship under Pokotan's reign is undocumented, therefore the length of his reign varies between 0 and 43 days.
June 8 (aired June 12)	To-y	What Are You Doing Tour? in Kyoto	The title change's exact date is uncertain. To-y appeared as champion at What Are You Doing Tour? in Kyoto.
June 8 (aired June 12)	Jun Akiyama	What Are You Doing Tour? in Kyoto	
June 8 (aired June 12)	Danshoku Dino	What Are You Doing Tour? in Kyoto	
June 8 (aired June 12)	To-y	What Are You Doing Tour? in Kyoto	This was a special six-man tag team match in which To-y teamed up with The37Kamiina stablemates Shunma Katsumata and Yuki Ueno to defeat D・O・A (Danshoku Dino, Makoto Oishi, and Jun Akiyama). To-y pinned Dino to win the match and the title subsequently.
June 8 (aired June 12)	Kazuki Hirata	N/A	Hirata pinned To-y in a hotel room after hitting him with a chop. The title change was shown on DDT's Twitter account.
June 9 (aired June 13)	Tsuruhimeka	What Are You Doing Tour? in Matsuyama	This was a six-person tag team match in which Tsuruhimeka teamed up with Sanshiro Takagi and Akito to defeat Kazuki Hirata, Shunma Katsumata and Makoto Oishi. Tsuruhimeka pinned Hirata to win the match and the title subsequently.
June 9 (aired June 13)	Kazuki Hirata	What Are You Doing Tour? in Matsuyama	Rolled Tsuruhimeka up in the ring.
June 9 (aired June 13)	Cutie Elly the Ehime	What Are You Doing Tour? in Matsuyama	Rolled Hirata up in the ring.
June 9 (aired June 13)	Chris Brookes	What Are You Doing Tour? in Matsuyama	Rolled Ellie up in the ring.
June 11 (aired June 15)	Mao	What Are You Doing? Tour in Asakusa	This was a tag team match where Mao teamed with The 37Kamiina stablemate To-y to defeat Chris Brookes and Ilusion. Mao pinned Brookes to win the match and the title subsequently.
June 11 (aired June 15)	Ilusion	What Are You Doing? Tour in Asakusa	Rolled Mao up in the ring.
June 11 (aired June 15)	Kazuma Sumi	What Are You Doing? Tour in Asakusa	Rolled Ilusion up in the ring.
June 21 (aired June 28)	Shunma Katsumata	DDT Spa & Pool Aqua Yukari - Sauna Street Wrestling	This was a five-way survival falls count anywhere match also involving Ilusion, To-y and Yukio Naya in which Katsumata's DDT Extreme Championship was also on the line.
June 21 (aired June 28)	Aufguss towel	DDT Spa & Pool Aqua Yukari - Sauna Street Wrestling	Katsumata was resting in a room and covered himself with a towel. Keigo Nakamura brought a referee who sanctioned it as a pinfall.
June 21 (aired June 28)	Keigo Nakamura	DDT Spa & Pool Aqua Yukari - Sauna Street Wrestling	Took the towel and submitted it by strangling in the same room.
June 22 (aired June 25)	Cima	What Are You Doing? Tour in Osaka	
June 23	Whip (II)	G Prowrestling Ver. 73	This was a Gleat event. Michiko Miyagi attacked Cima on backstage with a whip. Gamma carried her away while the whip remained on the chest of a beaten Cima who got pinned.
June 28	Unagi Sayaka	N/A	Pinned the whip while it was being interviewed by Lidet Entertainment President Hiroyuki Suzuki in the Lidet headquarters.
June 28	Stefan	CMLL Lady's Ring	Unagi Sayaka's stuffed dinosaur toy. Pinned Unagi Sayaka backstage. This was a Consejo Mundial de Lucha Libre event.
June 28	Mrs. Hanzawa of Mexico Tourism	CMLL Lady's Ring	This was a Consejo Mundial de Lucha Libre event. Hanzawa inadvertently sat on Stefan.
June 28	Tae Honma	CMLL Lady's Ring	This was a Consejo Mundial de Lucha Libre event. Honma tricked Mrs. Hanzawa into laying down for a massage and then pinned her.
June 28	Mrs. Matsuzawa	CMLL Lady's Ring	This was a Consejo Mundial de Lucha Libre event. Makoto's manager. Pinned Honma backstage.
June 28	Yuna Manase	CMLL Lady's Ring	This was a Consejo Mundial de Lucha Libre event.
June 28	Unagi Sayaka	CMLL Lady's Ring	This was a Consejo Mundial de Lucha Libre event.
June 29 (aired July 1)	Towel	Toden Pro Wrestling	Took place on board the Tokyo Sakura Tram. Minoru Suzuki choked Unagi Sayaka with his towel. Suzuki's towel was recognized as the champion despite Suzuki's protests.
June 29 (aired July 1)	Sugi-chan	Toden Pro Wrestling	Took place on board the Tokyo Sakura Tram.
June 29 (aired July 1)	Towel	Toden Pro Wrestling	Took place on board the Tokyo Sakura Tram. Minoru Suzuki choked Sugi-chan with his towel. Suzuki's towel was again recognized as champion.
June 29 (aired July 1)	Funky Kato	Toden Pro Wrestling	Took place on board the Tokyo Sakura Tram.
July 9	Danshoku Dino	N/A	
July 19	Sanshiro Takagi	N/A	Pinned Dino at the Wrestle Peter Pan press conference.
July 19	Danshoku Dino	N/A	Pinned Takagi at the Wrestle Peter Pan press conference.
July 27 (aired July 31)	Antonio Honda	After Peter Pan in Nagoya; Night 1	
July 27 (aired July 31)	Danshoku Dino	After Peter Pan in Nagoya; Night 1	
August 15	Joey Janela	Fighting Beer Garden in Shinjuku; Night 1	This was a tag team match in which Janela teamed with Takeshi Masada, while Danshoku Dino teamed with Effy.
August 15	Effy	Fighting Beer Garden in Shinjuku; Night 1	
August 15	Danshoku Dino	Fighting Beer Garden in Shinjuku; Night 1	
September 10 (aired September 13)	To-y	No Spoilers Beer Garden Fight in Ueno	This was a Sauna Manners Deathmatch where The 37Kamiina (To-y, Shunma Katsumata, and Yuki Ueno) defeated Danshoku Dino, Keizo Matsuda, and Takayuki Ueki. To-y pinned Dino to win the title and Dino's Right to Challenge Anytime, Anywhere contract.
September 10 (aired September 13)	Danshoku Dino	No Spoilers Beer Garden Fight in Ueno	Dino pinned To-y after the match.
September 15 (aired September 18)	Chris Brookes	Dramatic Infinity Tour in Sapporo; Night 1	This was a six-man tag team match in which Brookes teamed up with Ilusion and Akito to defeat Dino, Jun Akiyama, and Tomoya. Brookes pinned Dino to win the match and the title subsequently.
September 16 (aired September 19)	Danshoku Dino	Dramatic Infinity Tour in Sapporo; Night 2	This was a Birmingham Style match.
September 23	Shunma Katsumata	DDT Rembrandt Lariat Series Comeback ~ Battle of The Coral ~	
September 23	Danshoku Dino	DDT Rembrandt Lariat Series Comeback ~ Battle of The Coral ~	
September 29	Makoto Oishi	Dramatic Infinity	
September 29	Danshoku Dino	Dramatic Infinity	Pinned him after the match.
October 14 (aired October 17)	Shunma Katsumata	God Bless DDT Tour in Kumamoto	This was a tag team match where Katsumata teamed with Keigo Nakamura to defeat Dino and Soma Takao. Katsumata pinned Dino to win the match and the title subsequently.
October 14 (aired October 17)	Kazuki Hirata	God Bless DDT Tour in Kumamoto	Pinned Katsumata backstage after the event had ended.
October 17 (aired October 20)	Danshoku Dino	The Last Beer Garden Fight of 2024	
October 17 (aired October 20)	Kazuki Hirata	The Last Beer Garden Fight of 2024	This was a 7-on-6 handicap match where Hirata teamed with Harashima, To-y, Yuki Ishida, Kazuma Sumi, and Yuya Koroku to defeat Dino, Akito, Gota Ihashi, Shunma Katsumata, Thanomsak Toba, Toru Owashi, and Yukio Naya. Hirata pinned Dino to win the match and the title subsequently.
October 20	Yuni	God Bless DDT	This was a tag team match where Yuni teamed with Kazuma Sumi to defeat Hirata and Super Sasadango Machine. Yuni pinned Hirata to win the match and the title subsequently.
October 20	Danshoku Dino	God Bless DDT	
October 30 (airing November 2)	Kazuki Hirata	Adult Resort Pro Wrestling in Kiranah Garden Toyosu	
October 30 (airing November 2)	Danshoku Dino	Adult Resort Pro Wrestling in Kiranah Garden Toyosu	
November 4	Yuki Ueno	Sumida Dramatic Dream!	
November 4	Super Sasadango Machine	Sumida Dramatic Dream!	This was a six man tag team two-out-of-three falls match in which Sasadango teamed with Danshoku Dino and Harashima against The37Kamiina (Ueno, Shunma Katsumata, and To-y). Although this pinfall didn't count towards the match since Ueno wasn't the legal man, it still counted as an Ironman Heavymetalweight title change.
November 4	Shunma Katsumata	Sumida Dramatic Dream!	Katsumata pinned Sasadango to win the match and the title, subsequently.
November 4	Yuni	Sumida Dramatic Dream!	Pinned Katsumata after the match.
November 4–November 9	Undocumented	N/A	The history of the championship under Yuni's reign is undocumented, therefore the length of his reign varies between 0 and 5 days.
November 9	Danshoku Dino	DDT × DEFY DDT in Utero	The title change's exact date is uncertain. Dino appeared as champion at DDT × DEFY DDT in Utero
November 9	Randy Myers	DDT × DEFY DDT in Utero	
November 9	Danshoku Dino	DDT × DEFY DDT in Utero	This was a three-way match also involving Yoshihiko.
November 9	Yoshihiko	DDT × DEFY DDT in Utero	This was a three-way match also involving Randy Myers.
November 16	Kazuma Sumi	Get Alive Tour in Yokohama	
November 16	Kazuki Hirata	Get Alive Tour in Yokohama	This was a tag team match where Hirata teamed with Danshoku Dino to defeat Sumi and Soma Takao. Hirata pinned Sumi to win the match and the title, subsequently.
November 16	Yuki Ueno	Get Alive Tour in Yokohama	Pinned Hirata after the match.
November 23	Kazuki Hirata	Get Alive	
November 23	Yoshihiko	Get Alive	This was a handicap match where Yoshihiko teamed with Antonio Honda, Yuki Ishida, Soma Takao, Toru Owashi, and Diego to defeat Hirata. Yoshihiko pinned Hirata to win the match and the title, subsequently.
December 28	Makoto Oishi	Ultimate Party	Pinned Yoshihiko backstage before the start of the show.
December 28	Harashima	Ultimate Party	Pinned Makoto Oishi backstage before the start of the show.
December 28	Kazuki Hirata	Ultimate Party	Knocked Harashima out during his backstage interview at the end of the show.
December 28	Sanshiro Takagi	Ultimate Party	Pinned Kazuki Hirata in a bathtub backstage at the end of the show.

==== Noah ====
GHC Heavyweight Championship
Incoming champion – Kenoh
Date	Winner	Event/Show	Note(s)
February 4	El Hijo de Dr. Wagner Jr.	Cross Over in Sendai	
May 4	Kaito Kiyomiya	Wrestle Magic	

GHC Junior Heavyweight Championship
Incoming champion – Daga
Date	Winner	Event/Show	Note(s)
July 13	Amakusa	Destination	
September 1	Daga	N-1 Victory; Night 9	

GHC National Championship
Incoming champion – Jack Morris
Date	Winner	Event/Show	Note(s)
April 11	Hayata	Star Navigation; Night 4	
July 13	Ulka Sasaki	Destination	
September 14	Manabu Soya	Star Navigation in Tokyo	

GHC Tag Team Championship
Incoming champions – Good Looking Guys (Jack Morris and Anthony Greene)
Date	Winner	Event/Show	Note(s)
June 16	Naomichi Marufuji and Takashi Sugiura	Grand Ship In Yokohama	

GHC Junior Heavyweight Tag Team Championship
Incoming champions – Los Golpeadores (Dragon Bane and Alpha Wolf)
Date	Winner	Event/Show	Note(s)
January 2	Good Looking Guys (Tadasuke and Yo-Hey)	The New Year	This was a three-way tag team elimination match also involving Alejandro and Ninja Mack.
June 9	Eita and Shuji Kondo	Star Navigation; Night 7	
September 1	Ratel's (Hayata and Yo-Hey)	N-1 Victory; Night 9	

GHC Openweight Hardcore Championship
Incoming champion – Ninja Mack
Date	Winner	Event/Show	Note(s)
May 4	Shuji Ishikawa	Wrestle Magic; Pre-Show	This was a hardcore match.

GHC Women's Championship
Co-promoted with Dream Star Fighting Marigold
(Title created)
Date	Winner	Event/Show	Note(s)
November 11	Kouki Amarei	Magic Monday Autumn Vol. 3	Last eliminated Sadie Gibbs in a 11-woman battle royal to become the inaugural champion.

==== TJPW ====
Princess of Princess Championship
Incoming champion – Miyu Yamashita
Date	Winner	Event/Show	Note(s)
March 31	Miu Watanabe	Grand Princess	

Princess Tag Team Championship
Incoming champions – Vacant
Date	Winner	Event/Show	Note(s)
January 4	Ryo Mizunami and Yuki Aino	Tokyo Joshi Pro '24	Defeated Daisy Monkey (Arisu Endo and Suzume) and Hakuchumu (Miu Watanabe and Rika Tatsumi) in a three-way tag team match to win the vacant titles.
March 31	Daisy Monkey (Arisu Endo and Suzume)	Grand Princess	
September 22	121000000 (Miyu Yamashita and Maki Itoh)	Wrestle Princess V	

International Princess Championship
Incoming champion – Max the Impaler
Date	Winner	Event/Show	Note(s)
January 4	Yuki Arai	Tokyo Joshi Pro '24	

==== GanPro ====
Spirit of Ganbare World Openweight Championship
Incoming champion – Shuichiro Katsumura
On April 1, GanPro left CyberFight to become an independent promotion
Date	Winner	Event/Show	Note(s)
April 27	Keisuke Ishii	Spring Breakers	
December 27	Yumehito Imanari	Someday The Sun Will Shine	

Spirit of Ganbare World Tag Team Championship
Incoming champion – GroundAbsolute (Shuichiro Katsumura and Takuya Wada)
On April 1, GanPro left CyberFight to become an independent promotion
Date	Winner	Event/Show	Note(s)
June 2	Renegades (Mizuki Watase and Shigehiro Irie)	Wild Gamble	

=== CMLL ===
CMLL World Heavyweight Championship
Incoming champion – Gran Guerrero
No title changes.

CMLL World Light Heavyweight Championship
Incoming champion – Bárbaro Cavernario
Date	Winner	Event/Show	Note(s)
March 29	Averno	Homenaje a Dos Leyendas	

CMLL World Middleweight Championship
Incoming champion – Templario
No title changes.

CMLL World Welterweight Championship
Incoming champion – Titán
No title changes.

CMLL World Lightweight Championship
Incoming champion – Stigma
No title changes.

CMLL World Mini-Estrella Championship
Incoming champion – Último Dragoncito
No title changes.

CMLL World Micro-Estrellas Championship
Incoming champion – Micro Gemelo Diablo I
Date	Winner	Event/Show	Note(s)
N/A	Vacated	–	

CMLL World Tag Team Championship
Incoming champions – Los Hermanos Chavez (Ángel de Oro and Niebla Roja)
No title changes.

CMLL Arena Coliseo Tag Team Championship
Incoming champions – La Ola Negra (Akuma and Espanto Jr.)
Date	Winner	Event/Show	Note(s)
April 6	El Triangulo (El Hijo del Villano III and Villano III Jr.)	Sábados de Coliseo – 81: Aniversario de la Arena Coliseo	

CMLL World Trios Championship
Incoming champions – Atlantis Jr., Volador Jr., and Star Jr.
Date	Winner	Event/Show	Note(s)
February 5	Los Bárbaros (Bárbaro Cavernario, Dragón Rojo Jr., and El Terrible)	Lunes Arena Puebla	
July 16	Máscara Dorada, Star Jr., and Neón	Martes de Arena Mexico	
September 27	Los Infernales (Euforia, Averno, and Mephisto)	Noche de Campeones	

CMLL World Women's Championship
Incoming champion – Stephanie Vaquer
Date	Winner	Event/Show	Note(s)
July 10	Vacated	–	Vaquer was stripped of the title after she signed with WWE.
July 13	Willow Nightingale	Fantastica Mania USA	Defeated Lluvia and Viva Van to win the vacant title.
September 13	Zeuxis	CMLL 91st Anniversary Show	

CMLL Japan Women's Championship
Incoming champion – Dark Silueta
Date	Winner	Event/Show	Note(s)
June 28	Unagi Sayaka	Lady's Ring Lucha Fiesta 2	

CMLL World Women's Tag Team Championship
Incoming champions – Stephanie Vaquer and Zeuxis
Date	Winner	Event/Show	Note(s)
July 10	Vacated	–	The titles were vacated after Vaquer signed with WWE.
August 6	Tessa Blanchard and Lluvia	Martes de Arena Mexico	Defeated Persephone and Zeuxis in a tournament final to win the vacant titles.
December 13	Vacated	–	The titles were vacated after Blanchard departed the promotion.

NWA World Historic Light Heavyweight Championship
Incoming champion – Atlantis Jr.
No title changes.

NWA World Historic Middleweight Championship
Incoming champion – Místico
Date	Winner	Event/Show	Note(s)
October 30	Vacated	–	Místico relinquished the title at a press conference after moving up to the light heavyweight division.
November 15	Flip Gordon	Super Viernes	Defeated Villano III Jr. to win the vacant title.

NWA World Historic Welterweight Championship
Incoming champion – Máscara Dorada
No title changes.

Mexican National Heavyweight Championship
Incoming champion – Star Black
No title changes.

Mexican National Light Heavyweight Championship
Incoming champion – Esfinge
No title changes.

Mexican National Middleweight Championship
Incoming champion – Guerrero Maya Jr.
No title changes.

Mexican National Lightweight Championship
Incoming champion – Futuro
Date	Winner	Event/Show	Note(s)
September 27	Rayo Metálico	Noche de Campeones	

Mexican National Tag Team Championship
Incoming champions – Los Depredadores (Magnus and Rugido)
No title changes.

Mexican National Trios Championship
Incoming champions – Los Indestructibles (Apocalipsis, Cholo, and Disturbio)
Date	Winner	Event/Show	Note(s)
July 9	Los Viajeros del Espacio (Futuro, Max Star, and Hombre Bala Jr.)	Martes de Arena Mexico	

Mexican National Women's Championship
Incoming champion – Reyna Isis
Date	Winner	Event/Show	Note(s)
September 27	Sanely	Noche de Campeones	

Mexican National Women's Tag Team Championship
Incoming champions – Las Chicas Indomables (La Jarochita and Lluvia)
Date	Winner	Event/Show	Note(s)
March 8	Andrómeda and Skadi	Viernes Espectacular	

Occidente Heavyweight Championship
Incoming champion – Bestia Negra
No title changes.

Occidente Middleweight Championship
Incoming champion – Zandokan Jr.
No title changes.

Occidente Women's Championship
Incoming champion – Dark Silueta
Date	Winner	Event/Show	Note(s)
April 23	Lluvia	Martes de Glamour	

Occidente Tag Team Championship
Incoming champions – Furia Roja and Guerrero de la Noche
Date	Winner	Event/Show	Note(s)
January 2	Dulce Gardenia and La Fashion	Martes de Glamour	

Occidente Trios Championship
Incoming champions – Batallon de la Muerte (Rey Apocalipsis, El Malayo, and Siki Ozama Jr.)
Date	Winner	Event/Show	Note(s)
April 1	Crixus, Difunto, and Raider	Homenaje a Dos Leyendas – Puebla	

Occidente Women's Tag Team Championship
Incoming champions – Vacant
Date	Winner	Event/Show	Note(s)
January 23	Hatanna and Katara / Tabata	Martes de Glamour	Defeated Adira and La Pantera in a tournament final to win the vacant title. During the reign, Katara changed her name to Tabata.
April 23	Adira and Náutica	Martes de Glamour	

=== The Crash ===
The Crash Heavyweight Championship
Incoming champion – DMT Azul
No title changes.

The Crash Cruiserweight Championship
Incoming champion – Black Destiny
Date	Winner	Event/Show	Note(s)
November 8	Tonalli	The Crash XII Aniversario	This was a five-way tables, ladders, and chairs match also involving Dinamico, El Einviado, and Chris Carter.

The Crash Junior Championship
Incoming champion – Gallo Extreme
No title changes.

The Crash Women's Championship
Incoming champion – Julissa Mexa
Date	Winner	Event/Show	Note(s)
March 22	Keyra	The Crash	This was a five-way match also involving Ayako Hamada, Tiffany, and Jessica Roden.

The Crash Tag Team Championship
Incoming champions – Los Golpeadores (Dragon Bane and Alpha Wolf)
Date	Winner	Event/Show	Note(s)
June 28	La Dinistia Wagner (El Hijo de Dr. Wagner Jr. and Galeno del Mal)	The Crash	

=== CZW ===
CZW World Heavyweight Championship
Incoming champion – Rich Swann
Date	Winner	Event/Show	Note(s)
May 5	Eran Ashe	Limelight 25	

CZW World Tag Team Championship
Incoming champions – Milk Chocolate (Brandon Watts and Randy Summers)
No title changes.

=== DEFY ===
DEFY World Championship
Incoming champion – Kenta
No title changes.

DEFY Women's Championship
Incoming champion – VertVixen
Date	Winner	Event/Show	Note(s)
May 10	Marina Shafir	Here and Now	

DEFY PrimoLucha Championship
Incoming champion – Cody Chhun
Date	Winner	Event/Show	Note(s)
February 9	Guillermo Rosas	Seven	This was a DEFY 2 Survive Lucky 7 match also involving Matt Branagan, Schaff, Sebastian Wolfe, and Big Damo.

DEFY Tag Team Championship
Incoming champion – The Bollywood Boyz (Gurv Sihra and Harv Sihra)
Date	Winner	Event/Show	Note(s)
July 19	C4 (Cody Chhun and Guillermo Rosas)	For the Glory	This was a three-way tag team match also involving Sinner and Saint (Judas Icarus and Travis Williams).
December 1	Los Desperados (Arez and Gringo Loco)	DEFY x Progress Onslaught; Night 2	
December 29	Sinner and Saint (Judas Icarus and Travis Williams)	Blueprint	

=== DG ===
Open the Dream Gate Championship
Incoming champion – Luis Mante
Date	Winner	Event/Show	Note(s)
June 4	Ben-K	Rainbow Gate; Night 3	
July 21	Yamato	Kobe Pro-Wrestling Festival	

Open the Brave Gate Championship
Incoming champion – H.Y.O
Date	Winner	Event/Show	Note(s)
July 21	Dragon Dia	Kobe Pro-Wrestling Festival	
December 15	Yamato	The Final Gate	This was a Winner Takes All match also for Yamato's Open the Dream Gate Championship.

Open the Twin Gate Championship
Incoming champions – Alejandro and Kaito Kiyomiya
Date	Winner	Event/Show	Note(s)
May 5	Paradox (Dragon Kid and Naruki Doi)	Dead or Alive	
November 3	Natural Vibes (Flamita and Kzy)	Gate of Destiny	
December 15	Z-Brats (Jason Lee and Kota Minoura)	The Final Gate	

Open the Triangle Gate Championship
Incoming champions – Z-Brats (Ishin, Kai, and Yoshiki Kato)
Date	Winner	Event/Show	Note(s)
February 24	Vacated	–	
March 3	Z-Brats (Ishin, Kai, and Shun Skywalker)	Champion Gate in Osaka	Defeated D'courage (Dragon Dia, Madoka Kikuta, and Ryoya Tanaka) to win the vacant titles.
May 8	Natural Vibes (Big Boss Shimizu, Strong Machine J, and U-T)	Hopeful Gate; Night 1	
December 15	Paradox (BxB Hulk, Susumu Yokosuka, and Kagetora)	The Final Gate	

Open the Owarai Gate Championship
Incoming champion – Lingerie Muto
No title changes.

=== DPW ===
DPW Worlds Championship
Incoming champion – Calvin Tankman
Date	Winner	Event/Show	Note(s)
October 13 (aired October 19)	Jake Something	Super Battle	

DPW National Championship
Incoming champion – Bryan Keith
Date	Winner	Event/Show	Note(s)
July 1	Vacated	–	Keith vacated the title after suffering an injury.
July 7 (aired July 13)	Adam Priest	Tag Festival	Defeated BK Westbrook and Kevin Blackwood in a three-way match to win the vacant title.
December 8 (aired December 15)	LaBron Kozone	3rd Anniversary	

DPW Worlds Tag Team Championship
Incoming champions – Motor City Machine Guns (Alex Shelley and Chris Sabin)
Date	Winner	Event/Show	Note(s)
March 10	Speedball x Something (Mike Bailey and Jake Something)	Live 5	
December 8 (aired December 15)	Violence is Forever (Kevin Ku and Dominic Garrini)	3rd Anniversary	

DPW Women's Worlds Championship
Incoming champion – Miyuki Takase
No title changes.

=== Freedoms ===
King of Freedom World Championship
Incoming champion – Masashi Takeda
Date	Winner	Event/Show	Note(s)
September 15	Toru Sugiura	Freedoms 15th Anniversary! Feast of the Free People	
December 9 (aired December 15)	Kazumi Kikuta	BJW	This was a Glass Board Fluorescent Light Tubes Alpha Deathmatch. This was a Big Japan Pro Wrestling event.
December 31	Toru Sugiura	BJW King Of Deathmatch World GP Tournament	This was a Glass Board Fluorescent Lighttubes Alpha Death Match. This was a Big Japan Pro Wrestling event.

King of Freedom World Tag Team Championship
Incoming champion – ERE (Kyu Mogami and Toshiyuki Sakuda)
Date	Winner	Event/Show	Note(s)
July 11	Kenji Fukimoto and Violento Jack	Jun Kasai Produce Tokyo Death Match Carnival Vol. 1	
September 15	Takashi Sasaki and Yamato	Freedoms 15th Anniversary! Feast of the Free People	
December 25 (aired December 30)	Kenji Fukimoto and Violento Jack	Freedoms/Jun Kasai Produce Blood X'Mas	This was a Double Board and Weapon Deathmatch.

King of Freedom World Junior Heavyweight Championship
Incoming champion – Jun Masaoka
Date	Winner	Event/Show	Note(s)
March 22	Takahiro Katori	The Gekokujō	
September 15	Yuya Susumu	Freedoms 15th Anniversary! Feast of the Free People	

Barefoot King Championship
Incoming champion – Vacant
Date	Winner	Event/Show	Note(s)
February 8	Masashi Takeda	Go Beyond the Limit	Defeated Takayuki Ueki in a Barefoot Fluorescent Light Tubes & Thumbtacks + α Deathmatch in which Takeda's King of Freedom World Championship was also on the line to win the vacant title.
February 8	Vacated	Go Beyond the Limit	Takeda vacated the title immediately after winning it.
July 11	Toru Sugiura	Tokyo Death Match Carnival Vol. 1	Defeated Takayuki Ueki in a Barefoot Healthy Foot Reflexology Deathmatch in which Sugiura's King of Sugiuraman World Junior Heavyweight Championship was also on the line to win the vacant title.
July 11	Vacated	Tokyo Death Match Carnival Vol. 1	Sugiura vacated the title immediately after winning it.
August 29	Brahman Brothers (Brahman Shu and Brahman Kei)	Tokyo Death Match Carnival Vol. 2	Defeated Takayuki Ueki, Minoru Fujita, and Rina Yamashita in a Barefoot Five-Way Freestyle Deathmatch to win the vacant title. The title subsequently became the Barefoot King Tag Team Championship.
September 15	Chest Hair Brothers (Takayuki Ueki and Kentaro Hachisu)	Freedoms 15th Anniversary! Feast of the Free People	
October 10	ERE (Toshiyuki Sakuda and Kyu Mogami)	Tono No Yabo	This was a Barefoot Chest Hair Sea Bloody Sea Hell Deathmatch.
October 10	Vacated	Tono No Yabo	ERE vacated the titles immediately after winning them.
December 12	Takayuki Ueki	Road to Blood X'Mas	Defeated Jun Kasai in a Barefoot Deathmatch to win the vacant titles. The title subsequently reverted to the Barefoot King Championship.

=== GCW ===
GCW World Championship
Incoming champion – Blake Christian
Date	Winner	Event/Show	Note(s)
May 25	Vacated	Take A Picture	GCW General Manager Matt Cardona stripped Christian of the title due to his participation in the Best of the Super Juniors 31 and not being able to defend it at Cage of Survival 3.
June 2	Joey Janela	Cage of Survival 3	This was a Gauntlet of Survival match originally involving Nick Cage, John Wayne Murdoch, Kasey Catal, 1 Called Manders, Microman, Shane Mercer, Jordan Oliver, and Charles Mason, which originally Cage won. After that GCW General Manager Matt Cardona added "Broski" Jimmy Lloyd to the Gauntlet of Survival match, in which he eliminated Cage, but after that, Janela entered the match after he did not come out earlier and eliminated Lloyd to win a match and title.
June 2	Mance Warner	Cage of Survival 3	Invoked his Do or Die title opportunity.

GCW Extreme Championship
Incoming champion – Joey Janela
Date	Winner	Event/Show	Note(s)
March 9	Maki Itoh	Ashes To Ashes	This was a six-way scramble also involving Alex Zayne, "Broski" Jimmy Lloyd, Jack Cartwheel, and Marcus Mathers.

GCW Ultraviolent Championship
Incoming champion – Rina Yamashita
Date	Winner	Event/Show	Note(s)
October 12	Brandon Kirk	Fight Club; Night 1: The Art of War Games	
November 16	Sawyer Wreck	Nick Gage Invitational 9	This was the final of the Nick Gage Invitational.
November 16	Vacated	Nick Gage Invitational 9	The title was vacated due to Sawyer's retirement.

GCW Tag Team Championship
Incoming champions – Violence is Forever (Dominic Garrini and Kevin Ku)
No title changes.

JCW World Championship
Incoming champion – Jordan Oliver
Date	Winner	Event/Show	Note(s)
February 10	Masha Slamovich	Jersey J-Cup; Night 2	This was the final of the Jersey J-Cup tournament.

=== Gleat ===
G-Rex Championship
Incoming champion – Hayato Tamura
Date	Winner	Event/Show	Note(s)
December 30	Soma Watanabe	Gleat Ver. 14	

G-Infinity Championship
Incoming champions – Voodoo Murders (Jun Saito and Rei Saito)
Date	Winner	Event/Show	Note(s)
January 24	Vacated	–	Vacated after Rei Saito suffered a dislocated shoulder.
March 13	Coelacanths (Cima and Kaz Hayashi)	Gleat Ver. 10	Defeated #StrongHearts (Seiki Yoshioka and T-Hawk) in a tournament final to win the vacant titles.
July 1	Black Generation International (Kaito Ishida and Tetsuya Izuchi)	Gleat Ver. 12	
October 6	The Rascalz (Trey Miguel and Zachary Wentz)	Gleat Ver. Mega in Osaka	
December 19	Vacated	–	Vacated after Trey Miguel suffered a broken finger.
December 30	Kuroshio Tokyo Japan and Seigo Tachibana	Gleat Ver. 14	Defeated #StrongHearts (El Lindaman and T-Hawk) to win the vacant titles.

Lidet UWF World Championship
Incoming champion – Fujita "Jr." Hayato
Date	Winner	Event/Show	Note(s)
June 21	Vacated	Michinoku 2024 Tokyo Conference Vol.1 ~ Buryō Tōgen	Hayato vacated the title due to illness.
July 1	Katsuhiko Nakajima	Gleat Ver. 12	Defeated Takanori Ito to win the vacant title.

=== GWF ===
GWF World Championship
Incoming champion – Mike D Vecchio
Date	Winner	Event/Show	Note(s)
September 1	Toni Harting	Battlefield	
November 4	Peter Tihanyi	GWF Legacy: 29 Jahre Berlin Wrestling	

GWF Women's World Championship
Incoming champion – Jessy Jay
Date	Winner	Event/Show	Note(s)
August 30	Lizzy Evo	GWF/RevPro: Double Impact; Night 1	

GWF Tag Team Championship
Incoming champions – Sunshine Machine (Chuck Mambo and TK Cooper)
Date	Winner	Event/Show	Note(s)
April 7	Axel Tischer and Metahan	Mystery Mayhem	
June 2	Aytaç Bahar and Pascal Spalter	Rising Heat	

GWF Berlin Championship
Incoming champion – Crowchester
Date	Winner	Event/Show	Note(s)
April 7	Ali Aslan	Mystery Mayhem	
May 18	Crowchester	Light Heavyweight World Cup '24	
June 2	Ahura	Rising Heat	
November 4	Rambo	GWF Legacy: 29 Jahre Berlin Wrestling	This was a ladder match.

GWF Mixed Tag Team Championship
Incoming champions – Heartbreak and Kicks (Amy Heartbeat and Fast Time Moodo)
Date	Winner	Event/Show	Note(s)
September 1	Stephanie Maze and Tarkan Aslan	Battlefield	This was a three-way mixed tag team match also involving Der Clan (Pahlevan Nima and Sultan Suzu).
December 1	Der Clan (Pahlevan Nima and Sultan Suzu)	Final Countdown	

=== HOG ===
HOG World Heavyweight Championship
Incoming champion – Mike Santana
No title changes.

HOG Women's Championship
Incoming champion – The Ultra Violette
Date	Winner	Event/Show	Note(s)
July 26	Megan Bayne	High Intensity	

HOG Tag Team Championship
Incoming champions – The Mane Event (Jay Lyon and Midas Black)
Date	Winner	Event/Show	Note(s)
July 26	The Cold Blooded Killers (Charles Mason, Jay Armani, Nolo Kitano, and Raheem Royal)	High Intensity	This was an "I quit" match. Mason and Kitano won the titles, but Royal and Armani were also recognized as champions under the Freebird Rule.

HOG Cruiserweight Championship
Incoming champion – Nolo Kitano
Date	Winner	Event/Show	Note(s)
March 2	KC Navarro	Reckoning	This was a Suicidal Six-Way match also involving Daron Richardson, Raheem Royal, Jay Lyon, and Jay Armani.
May 24	Gringo Loco	The War Within	
December 20	Daron Richardson	Live for the Moment	This was a six-way scramble also involving Dante Silver, J Boujii, Joey Silver, and Mantequilla.

HOG Crown Jewel Championship
Incoming champions – Carlos Ramirez
Date	Winner	Event/Show	Note(s)
July 26	Zilla Fatu	High Intensity	

=== Ice Ribbon ===
ICE×∞ Championship
Incoming champion – Ibuki Hoshi
Date	Winner	Event/Show	Note(s)
April 6	Vacated	Ice Ribbon Kamata	The title was vacated due to Ibuki going on maternity leave.
June 23	Yuuri	New Ice Ribbon #1354 ~ After The Rain	Defeated Hamuko Hoshi in the final of the ICE×∞ Championship League to win the vacant title.
October 19	Yuki Mashiro	New Ice Ribbon #1376 ~ Oktober Ice Ribbon Fest	

FantastICE Championship
Incoming champion – Akane Fujita
No title changes.

International Ribbon Tag Team Championship
Incoming champions – Kyuri and Mifu Ashida
Date	Winner	Event/Show	Note(s)
March 23	Big Dekai (Satsuki Totoro and Yuna Manase)	New Ice Ribbon #1337 ~ Ice Ribbon March	
July 14	Mukomako (Hamuko Hoshi and Makoto)	New Ice Ribbon #1358	

Triangle Ribbon Championship
Incoming champions – Vacant
Date	Winner	Event/Show	Note(s)
March 23	Yuki Mashiro	New Ice Ribbon #1337 ~ Ice Ribbon March	Defeated Makoto and Kaho Matsushita to win the vacant title.
July 27	Kaori Yoneyama	New Ice Ribbon #1360 Yokohama Ribbon ~ July	This was a three-way match also involving Matsuzawa-san.
August 8	Vacated	–	The title was vacated under unknown circumstances.
August 11	Nanami	YMZ Gokigen Kawasaki #86	This was a YMZ Pro Wrestling event. Defeated Cherry and Matsuzawa-san in a three-way match to win the vacant title.
August 24	Kyuri	New Ice Ribbon #1366 ~ Ice in Wonderland	This was a three-way match also involving Saran.

=== IWRG ===
IWRG Intercontinental Heavyweight Championship
Incoming champion – DMT Azul
No title changes.

IWRG Intercontinental Middleweight Championship
Incoming champion – Relámpago
Date	Winner	Event/Show	Note(s)
February 18	Vacated	–	
February 18	Noisy Boy	El Protector	Defeated Aster Boy, El Hijo del Alebrije, Septimo Dragon, and Spider Fly in a five-way match to win the vacant title.
May 1	Arez	Choque de Fieras Encadenados	

IWRG Intercontinental Welterweight Championship
Incoming champion – Tonalli
Date	Winner	Event/Show	Note(s)
January 1	Dr. Cerebro Jr. / Multifacetico Jr	Guerreros de Acero	Title vs. Mask vs. Hair three-way match also involving Puma de Oro. Cerebro wagered his mask and Puma wagered his hair against Tonalli's title. During this reign, Dr. Cerebro Jr. changed his name to Multifacetico Jr.

IWRG Intercontinental Lightweight Championship
Incoming champion – Aguila Roja
No title changes.

IWRG Intercontinental Women's Championship
Incoming champion – Keyra
No title changes.

IWRG Intercontinental Tag Team Championship
Incoming champions – Los Terribles Cerebros (Cerebro Negro and Cerebro Negro Jr.)
Date	Winner	Event/Show	Note(s)
July 14	Mala Fama (Látigo and Toxin)	IWRG	
July 28	El Hijo de Canis Lupus and Hell Boy	IWRG	

IWRG Intercontinental Trios Championship
Incoming champions – La Pandemia (Gran Pandemonium, Hijo de Pandemonium, and Pandemonium Jr.)
Date	Winner	Event/Show	Note(s)
March 14	Mala Fama (Arez, Látigo, and Toxin)	IWRG Tryout Gran Final	
October 31	Las Shotas (Jessy Ventura, La Diva Salvaje, and Mamba)	Castillo del Terror	Defeated Látigo, Toxin, and Noisy Boy, who substituted in for Arez.

IWRG Junior de Juniors Championship
Incoming champion – El Hijo de Fishman
Date	Winner	Event/Show	Note(s)
October 3	El Hijo de Canis Lupus	IWRG Thursday Night Wrestling	

IWRG Rey del Ring Championship
Incoming champion – Vito Fratelli
Date	Winner	Event/Show	Note(s)
May 12	Vangellys	IWRG	

IWRG Rey del Aire Championship
Incoming champion – Noisy Boy
Date	Winner	Event/Show	Note(s)
June 6	Spider Fly	IWRG Thursday Night Wrestling	

IWRG Mexico Championship
Incoming champion – Hell Boy
No title changes.

Distrito Federal Trios Championship
Incoming champions – El Infierno Eterno (Demonio Infernal, Eterno, and Lunatic Extreme)
No title changes.

IWRG World Lucha Libre Championship
Incoming champion – Vito Fratelli
No title changes.

=== JTO ===
King of JTO
Incoming champion – Ryuya Takekura
Date	Winner	Event/Show	Note(s)
March 1	Fire Katsumi	JTO	
November 1	Keita	JTO	
December 12	Vacated	—	
December 15	Fire Katsumi	West Japan Series; Night 7	Defeated Genta Yubari to win the vacant title.

JTO Openweight Championship
Incoming champion – Ren Ayabe
Date	Winner	Event/Show	Note(s)
March 1	Gladio	JTO	
July 19	Vacated	—	
August 31	Genta Yubari	JTO	Defeated Fire Katsumi to win the vacant title.

JTO Tag Team Championship
(Title introduced)
Date	Winner	Event/Show	Note(s)
October 5	Myo-o (Hiro Iijima and Ryoma Tsukamoto)	JTO Tag Championship One Day Tournament; Part 2	Defeated Genesis (Akira Jumonji and Fire Katsumi) in a tournament final to become the inaugural champions.
November 1	Ill Gravity (Ara and Naoya Akama)	JTO	
December 7	Myo-o (Ibuki and Miyumasa)	West Japan Series; Night 1	

Queen of JTO
Incoming champion – Aoi
Date	Winner	Event/Show	Note(s)
January 6	Tomoka Inaba	JTO Girls Special	
August 29	Aoi	JTO Girls Special	
December 27	Sumika Yanagawa	JTO	

JTO Girls Championship
Incoming champion – Misa Kagura
Date	Winner	Event/Show	Note(s)
January 6	Unagi Sayaka	JTO Girls Special	
May 10	Aoi	Michinoku The Super Best	
October 14	Yuu Yamagata	Hakodate General Wholesale Center Convention	
December 7	Azusa Inaba	JTO	

JTO Girls Tag Team Championship
(Title introduced)
Date	Winner	Event/Show	Note(s)
October 5	Aoi and Tomoka Inaba	JTO Tag Championship One Day Tournament; Part 2	Defeated Misa Kagura and Yuuri in a tournament final to become the inaugural champions.

UWA World Middleweight Championship
Incoming champion – Carbell Ito
Date	Winner	Event/Show	Note(s)
February 25	Vacated	—	
March 1	Naoya Akama	JTO	Last eliminated Yuu Yamagata in a 7-person intergender battle royal to win the vacant title.
May 10	Sumika Yanagawa	Michinoku The Super Best	This was a 9-person intergender Akama-Style Battle Royal. Yanagawa last eliminated Naoya Akama, becoming the first female wrestler to win the title.
August 29	Misa Kagura	JTO Girls Special	
November 2	Bomber Tatsuya	JTO	This was a 10-person intergender battle royal. Tatsuya last eliminated Misa Kagura to win the title.

=== MLW ===
MLW World Heavyweight Championship
Incoming champion – Alex Kane
Date	Winner	Event/Show	Note(s)
February 3	Satoshi Kojima	SuperFight	

MLW World Tag Team Championship
Incoming champions – The Second Gear Crew (Matthew Justice, 1 Called Manders, and Good Brother #3)
Date	Winner	Event/Show	Note(s)
February 29	World Titan Federation (Davey Boy Smith Jr. and Tom Lawlor)	Intimidation Games	
April 22	Vacated	–	MLW vacated the titles after Smith and Lawlor were attacked by Contra Unit.
May 11	CozyMax (Satoshi Kojima and Shigeo Okumura)	Azteca Lucha	Defeated The Second Gear Crew (Matthew Justice and 1 Called Manders) to win the vacant titles.
August 29	Contra Unit (Minoru Suzuki and Ikuro Kwon)	Summer of the Beasts	
December 5	CozyMax (Satoshi Kojima and Shigeo Okumura)	Eric Bischoff's One Shot	

MLW World Middleweight Championship
Incoming champion – Rocky Romero
Date	Winner	Event/Show	Note(s)
February 29	Místico	Intimidation Games	

MLW National Openweight Championship
Incoming champion – Rickey Shane Page
Date	Winner	Event/Show	Note(s)
May 11	Bad Dude Tito	Azteca Lucha	
November 9	Matthew Justice	Lucha Apocalypto	This was a Falls Count Anywhere match.

MLW World Women's Featherweight Championship
Incoming champion – Janai Kai
No title changes.

=== M-Pro ===
Tohoku Junior Heavyweight Championship
Incoming champion – Fujita Hayato
Date	Winner	Event/Show	Note(s)
April 22	Vacated	Michinoku 2024 Tokyo Conference Vol.1 ~ Buryō Tōgen	Hayato vacated the title due to illness.
November 16	Rui Hiugaji	Hito Tsubu Mani; Night 1	Defeated Ringo Yamaya to win the vacant title.
November 17	El Pantera Jr.	Hito Tsubu Mani; Night 2	

Tohoku Tag Team Championship
Incoming champions – Kagetora and Yoshitsune
Date	Winner	Event/Show	Note(s)
March 16 (aired April 2)	Rasse and Ringo Yamaya	Michinoku Pro 31th Anniversary ~ Kashin Reigetsu; Night 1	

=== Marigold ===
Marigold World Championship
(Title created)
Date	Winner	Event/Show	Note(s)
July 13	Sareee	Summer Destiny	Defeated Giulia to become the inaugural champion.

Marigold United National Championship
(Title created)
Date	Winner	Event/Show	Note(s)
July 13	Miku Aono	Summer Destiny	Defeated Bozilla in a tournament final to become the inaugural champion.

Marigold Twin Star Championship
(Title created)
Date	Winner	Event/Show	Note(s)
July 30	MiraiSaku (Mirai and Mai Sakurai)	Summer Gold Shine; Night 5	Defeated Miku Aono and Natsumi Showzuki in a tournament final to become the inaugural champions.
December 13	Dark Wolf Army (Nagisa Nozaki and Chiaki)	Winter Wonderful Fight; Night 2	

Marigold Super Fly Championship
(Title created)
Date	Winner	Event/Show	Note(s)
July 13	Natsumi Showzuki	Summer Destiny	Defeated Misa Matsui in a tournament final to become the inaugural champion.

GHC Women's Championship
Co-promoted with Pro Wrestling Noah
(Title created)
Date	Winner	Event/Show	Note(s)
November 11	Kouki Amarei	Noah Magic Monday Autumn Vol. 3	Last eliminated Sadie Gibbs in a 11-woman battle royal to become the inaugural champion.

=== NWA ===
NWA World's Heavyweight Championship
Incoming champion – EC3
Date	Winner	Event/Show	Note(s)
August 31 (aired October 1)	Thom Latimer	NWA 76	

NWA National Championship
Incoming champion – "Thrillbilly" Silas Mason
Date	Winner	Event/Show	Note(s)
January 14 (aired March 19)	Vacated	NWA Powerrr	Mason voluntarily vacated the title to challenge for the NWA World's Heavyweight Championship at Hard Times 4.
March 2 (aired May 7)	Thom Latimer	Hard Times 4	Defeated Blake "Bulletproof" Troop, Burchill, and Zyon in a four-way match to win the vacant title.
June 1 (aired September 10)	Vacated	Back to the Territories	Latimer voluntarily vacated the title to challenge for the NWA Worlds Heavyweight Championship at NWA 76.
August 31 (aired October 8)	Mims	NWA 76	Defeated Burchill, Bryan Idol, and Carson Drake in a four-way elimination match to win the vacant title.

NWA World Television Championship
Incoming champion – Mims
Date	Winner	Event/Show	Note(s)
January 13 (aired February 13)	Max the Impaler	Paranoia	Unification match also for Max's NWA World Women's Television Championship.
October 26 (aired December 10)	Carson Bartholomew Drake	Samhain 2	This was a Hell Awaits match.

NWA World Junior Heavyweight Championship
Incoming champion – Colby Corino
Date	Winner	Event/Show	Note(s)
March 2 (aired April 9)	Joe Alonzo	Hard Times 4	
June 28	Alex Taylor	NWA Chicago Endless Summer	

NWA Mid-America Heavyweight Championship
(Title reactivated)
Date	Winner	Event/Show	Note(s)
June 1 (aired September 10)	Jeremiah Plunket	Back to the Territories	Defeated Dante Casanova, Hunter Drake, and Mario Pardua in a four-way elimination match to win the vacant title. The title had been inactive since 1988.

NWA World Women's Championship
Incoming champion – Kenzie Paige
No title changes.

NWA World Women's Television Championship
Incoming champion – Max the Impaler
Date	Winner	Event/Show	Note(s)
January 13 (aired February 13)	Unified	Paranoia	Max the Impaler defeated Mims to unify the NWA World Women's Television Championship into the NWA World Television Championship.
June 1 (aired September 3)	Vacated	Back to the Territories	Max the Impaler voluntarily vacated the title under the "Lucky Seven Rule" to challenge for the NWA World Women's Championship at NWA 76.
October 18	Big Mama	NWA Chicago Super Smashing Halloween	Defeated Natalia Markova, Tiffany Nieves, and Haley J in a four-way match to win the vacant title.

NWA World Tag Team Championship
Incoming champions – Blunt Force Trauma (Carnage and Damage)
Date	Winner	Event/Show	Note(s)
June 1 (aired September 3)	Knox and Murdoch	Back to the Territories	

NWA United States Tag Team Championship
Incoming champions – The Immortals (Kratos and Odinson)
Date	Winner	Event/Show	Note(s)
March 2 (aired April 16)	Vacated	Hard Times 4	Kratos and Odinson vacated the titles to challenge for the NWA World Tag Team Championship.
April 13 (aired July 30)	Daisy Kill and Talos	NWA Powerrr	Defeated The Fixers, L.L.C. (Jay Bradley and Wrecking Ball Legursky) in a tournament final to win the vacant titles.
August 31 (aired October 22)	The Country Gentlemen (AJ Cazana and KC Cazana)	NWA 76	This was a four-way tag team match also involving The Fixers, L.L.C. (Jay Bradley and Wrecking Ball Legursky) and The Slimeballz (Sage Chantz and Tommy Rant).

NWA World Women's Tag Team Championship
Incoming champions – Pretty Empowered (Ella Envy and Kylie Paige)
Date	Winner	Event/Show	Note(s)
January 13 (aired February 27)	The King Bees (Charity King and Danni Bee)	Paranoia	
August 31 (aired October 22)	The It Girls (Ella Envy and Miss Star)	NWA 76	Envy previously held the titles as part of Pretty Empowered.
December 14 (aired February 11, 2025)	Kenzie Paige and Big Mama	Looks That Kill	

=== NJPW ===
IWGP World Heavyweight Championship
Incoming champion – Sanada
Date	Winner	Event/Show	Note(s)
January 4	Tetsuya Naito	Wrestle Kingdom 18	
April 12	Jon Moxley	Windy City Riot	
June 30	Tetsuya Naito	Forbidden Door	
October 14	Zack Sabre Jr.	King of Pro-Wrestling	

IWGP Global Heavyweight Championship
(Title created)
Date	Winner	Event/Show	Note(s)
January 4	David Finlay	Wrestle Kingdom 18	Defeated Will Ospreay and Jon Moxley in a three-way match to become the inaugural champion.
February 23	Nic Nemeth	The New Beginning in Sapporo; Night 1	
May 4	David Finlay	Wrestling Dontaku; Night 2	

IWGP Tag Team Championship
Incoming champions – Bishamon (Hirooki Goto and Yoshi-Hashi)
Date	Winner	Event/Show	Note(s)
January 4	Guerrillas of Destiny (Hikuleo and El Phantasmo)	Wrestle Kingdom 18	This was a Winner Takes All match also for G.O.D.'s Strong Openweight Tag Team Championship.
February 11	Bullet Club (Chase Owens and Kenta)	The New Beginning in Osaka	
April 6	Bishamon (Hirooki Goto and Yoshi-Hashi)	Sakura Genesis	
May 4	Bullet Club (Kenta and Chase Owens)	Wrestling Dontaku; Night 2	
June 9	TMDK (Mikey Nicholls and Shane Haste)	Dominion 6.9 in Osaka-jo Hall	This was a four-way tornado tag team elimination winners take all match also involving Guerrillas of Destiny (Hikuleo and El Phantasmo) and Bishamon (Hirooki Goto and Yoshi-Hashi). G.O.D.'s Strong Openweight Tag Team Championship were also on the line.
November 4	United Empire (Great-O-Khan and Henare)	Power Struggle	

IWGP Junior Heavyweight Championship
Incoming champion – Hiromu Takahashi
Date	Winner	Event/Show	Note(s)
January 4	El Desperado	Wrestle Kingdom 18	
February 23	Sho	The New Beginning in Sapporo; Night 1	Won the title by countout. Had Sho lost, he would have had to join Strong Style.
June 16	El Desperado	New Japan Soul; Night 1	This was a steel cage match.
July 5	Douki	New Japan Soul; Night 7	

IWGP Junior Heavyweight Tag Team Championship
Incoming champions – Bullet Club War Dogs (Clark Connors and Drilla Moloney)
Date	Winner	Event/Show	Note(s)
January 4	Catch 2/2 (TJP and Francesco Akira)	Wrestle Kingdom 18	
February 4	Bullet Club War Dogs (Clark Connors and Drilla Moloney)	Road to the New Beginning; Night 6	
October 14	Intergalactic Jet Setters (Kevin Knight and Kushida)	King of Pro-Wrestling	

IWGP Women's Championship
Incoming champion – Mayu Iwatani
Co-promoted with World Wonder Ring Stardom
No title changes.

NEVER Openweight Championship
Incoming champion – Shingo Takagi
Date	Winner	Event/Show	Note(s)
January 4	Tama Tonga	Wrestle Kingdom 18	
January 20	Evil	The New Beginning in Nagoya	This was a Lumberjack match.
April 6	Shingo Takagi	Sakura Genesis	
June 16	Henare	New Japan Soul; Night 1	
September 29	Shingo Takagi	Destruction in Kobe	

NEVER Openweight 6-Man Tag Team Championship
Incoming champions – Hiroshi Tanahashi and Chaos (Kazuchika Okada and Tomohiro Ishii)
Date	Winner	Event/Show	Note(s)
January 24	Vacated	Road to The New Beginning; Night 3	Okada vacated his championship due to his contract with New Japan Pro-Wrestling expiring.
April 14	Hiroshi Tanahashi, Toru Yano, and Oleg Boltin	Wrestling World in Taiwan	Defeated House of Torture (Evil, Sho, and Yoshinobu Kanemaru) in a tournament final for the vacant titles.
June 9	Los Ingobernables de Japon (Yota Tsuji, Hiromu Takahashi, and Bushi)	Dominion 6.9 in Osaka-jo Hall	
June 16	Hiroshi Tanahashi, Toru Yano, and Oleg Boltin	New Japan Soul; Night 1	

KOPW
Incoming champion (lineal) – Taichi
Date	Winner	Event/Show	Note(s)
January 5	Taiji Ishimori	New Year Dash!!	Defeated Great-O-Khan, Toru Yano and Yoh in a four-way match to become the first provisional 2024 champion.
January 20	Great-O-Khan	The New Beginning in Nagoya	This was a Ten-Minute Ishimori Ring Fit match.
April 27	Yuya Uemura	Road to Wrestling Dontaku; Night 7	This was a "Rural Revitalization in Hamamatsu" two-out-of-three falls match. Uemura won 2–1.
June 9	Great-O-Khan	Dominion 6.9 in Osaka-jo Hall	This was a Storm Catch Rules match.
December 22	Great-O-Khan	Road to Tokyo Dome; Night 4	Defeated Taichi in a two out of three falls match to become the official 2024 KOPW champion.
December 22	Deactivated	—	Last champion Great-O-Khan announced a retirement of the title.

NJPW World Television Championship
Incoming champion – Zack Sabre Jr.
Date	Winner	Event/Show	Note(s)
January 4	Hiroshi Tanahashi	Wrestle Kingdom 18	
February 23	Matt Riddle	The New Beginning in Sapporo; Night 1	
April 12	Zack Sabre Jr.	Windy City Riot	
May 3	Jeff Cobb	Wrestling Dontaku; Night 1	
October 14	Ren Narita	King of Pro-Wrestling	This was a three-way match also involving Yota Tsuji.

Strong Openweight Championship
Incoming champion – Eddie Kingston
Date	Winner	Event/Show	Note(s)
May 11	Gabe Kidd	Resurgence	This was a No Ropes Last Man Standing match.

Strong Openweight Tag Team Championship
Incoming champions – Guerrillas of Destiny (Hikuleo and El Phantasmo)
Date	Winner	Event/Show	Note(s)
April 12	TMDK (Shane Haste and Mikey Nicholls)	Windy City Riot	This was a four corners tag team match also involving Fred Rosser and Tom Lawlor, and West Coast Wrecking Crew (Jorel Nelson and Royce Isaacs).
May 11	Guerrillas of Destiny (Hikuleo and El Phantasmo)	Resurgence	
June 9	TMDK (Mikey Nicholls and Shane Haste)	Dominion 6.9 in Osaka-jo Hall	This was a four-way tornado tag team elimination winners take all match also involving Bullet Club (Kenta and Chase Owens) and Bishamon (Hirooki Goto and Yoshi-Hashi). Bullet Club's IWGP Tag Team Championship were also on the line.
November 8	Grizzled Young Veterans (James Drake and Zack Gibson)	Fighting Spirit Unleashed	
December 15	West Coast Wrecking Crew (Jorel Nelson and Royce Isaacs)	Strong Style Evolved	

Strong Women's Championship
Incoming champion – Giulia
Co-promoted with World Wonder Ring Stardom
Date	Winner	Event/Show	Note(s)
March 10	Stephanie Vaquer	Stardom Cinderella Tournament; Night 2	
June 30	Mercedes Moné	Forbidden Door	This was a Winner Takes All match where Moné's AEW TBS Championship was also on the line.

=== Osaka Pro ===
Osaka Pro Wrestling Championship
Incoming champion – Quiet Storm
Date	Winner	Event/Show	Note(s)
August 24	Zeus	Summer Festival	
December 29	Toru	Excalibur	

Osaka Light Heavyweight Championship
Incoming champion – Ryuya Matsufusa
No title changes.

Osaka Meibutsu Sekaiichi Championship
Incoming champion – Joichiro Osaka
Date	Winner	Event/Show	Note(s)
August 24	Kanjyuro Matsuyama	Summer Festival	
December 29	Joichiro Osaka	Excalibur	

Osaka Tag Team Championship
Incoming champion – Rogue Nation (Goliath and Toru)
Date	Winner	Event/Show	Note(s)
June 23	Tsubasa and Billyken Kid	Castle Festival	
October 27	Rogue Nation (Shu Asakawa and Yasutaka Oosera)	Autumn Festival	
December 29	Quiet Storm and Shigehiro Irie	Excalibur	

=== Prestige ===
Prestige World Championship
Incoming champion – Alex Shelley
Date	Winner	Event/Show	Note(s)
March 24	Alan Angels	Alive II	
July 20	Starboy Charlie	Untouchable	The event was co-promoted by West Coast Pro Wrestling and Deadlock Pro-Wrestling.
September 9	Alan Angels	Marvelous TV	This was a Marvelous event.

Prestige Tag Team Championship
Incoming champion – C4 (Cody Chhun and Guillermo Rosas)
Date	Winner	Event/Show	Note(s)
January 5	Sinner and Saint (Travis Williams and Judas Icarus)	Roseland 7	

=== Progress ===
PROGRESS World Championship
Incoming champion – Spike Trivet
Date	Winner	Event/Show	Note(s)
February 25	Kid Lykos	Chapter 163: Twisted Metal	This was a steel cage match.
July 28	Luke Jacobs	Chapter 169: The Devil On My Shoulder	

Progress Atlas Championship
Incoming champion – Ricky Knight Jr.
Date	Winner	Event/Show	Note(s)
April 5	Yoichi	Chapter 166: Freedom Walks Again	
May 27	Axel Tischer	Super Strong Style 16; Night 2	

Progress Proteus Championship
Incoming champion – Paul Robinson
Date	Winner	Event/Show	Note(s)
October 27	Simon Miller	Chapter 172: Werewolves of London	Miller's announced stipulation is that all stipulations for his defenses will be decided by fan poll via social media or live events

Progress Tag Team Championship
Incoming champions – Smokin' Aces (Charlie Sterling and Nick Riley)
Date	Winner	Event/Show	Note(s)
February 25	Cheeky Little Buggers (Alexxis Falcon and Charles Crowley)	Chapter 163: Twisted Metal	
April 5	SAnitY (Big Damo and Axel Tischer)	Chapter 166: Freedom Walks Again	This was a three-way tag team match also involving Sunshine Machine (Chuck Mambo and TK Cooper).
September 22	Smokin' Aces (Charlie Sterling and Nick Riley)	Chapter 171: History is Written by The Victors	This was a street fight.

Progress World Women's Championship
Incoming champion – Rhio
Date	Winner	Event/Show	Note(s)
December 29	Nina Samuels	Chapter 175: Unboxing VII: The Curtain Call	

=== PWG ===
PWG World Championship
Incoming champion – Daniel Garcia
No title changes.

PWG World Tag Team Championship
Incoming champions – Kings of the Black Throne (Malakai Black and Brody King)
No title changes.

=== RevPro ===
Undisputed British Heavyweight Championship
Incoming champions – Michael Oku
Date	Winner	Event/Show	Note(s)
August 24	Luke Jacobs	RevPro 12th Anniversary Show	
December 21	Michael Oku	Uprising	

Undisputed British Cruiserweight Championship
Incoming champion – Leon Slater
Date	Winner	Event/Show	Note(s)
March 3	Jordan Breaks	Live in London 83	
May 19	Neón	Fantastica Mania UK; Show 2	
August 24	Will Kaven	RevPro 12th Anniversary Show	This was a six-way match also involving Cameron Khai, El Phantasmo, Leon Slater, and Dante Martin.

Undisputed British Women's Championship
Incoming champion – Dani Luna
Date	Winner	Event/Show	Note(s)
August 24	Mina Shirakawa	RevPro 12th Anniversary Show	

Undisputed British Tag Team Championship
Incoming champions – Subculture (Mark Andrews and Flash Morgan Webster)
Date	Winner	Event/Show	Note(s)
March 31	Grizzled Young Veterans (Zack Gibson and James Drake)	Revolution Rumble	
August 24	Sunshine Machine (Chuck Mambo and TK Cooper)	RevPro 12th Anniversary Show	
December 21	Jay Joshua and Connor Mills	Uprising	

=== REVOLVER ===
REVOLVER World Championship
Incoming champion – Jake Crist
Date	Winner	Event/Show	Note(s)
January 25	Alex Shelley	Mox vs. Gringo	This was a two-out-of-three falls winner takes all match also for Shelley's PWR Remix Championship. Shelley won 2–1.
June 22	Ace Austin	Cage of Horrors 3	
December 7	Myron Reed	Season Finale	

PWR Tag Team Championship
Incoming champions – RED (Alex Colon, Rickey Shane Page, and Steve Maclin)
Date	Winner	Event/Show	Note(s)
January 25	Grizzled Young Veterans (Zack Gibson and James Drake)	Mox vs. Gringo	This was a four-way tag team match also involving The Rascalz (Trey Miguel and Zachary Wentz) and The Second Gear Crew (Matthew Justice and 1 Called Manders).
March 16	Good Lucha Things (Lince Dorado and Samuray del Sol)	Ready or Not!	
August 28	Vacated		
September 21	RED (Alex Colon and Dark Pledge)	Tales from The Ring 7	Won a four-way tag team match also involving The Rascalz (Trey Miguel and Zachary Wentz), Alpha Sigma Sigma (Brent Oakley and KC Jacobs), and The Dub Club (KJ Reynolds and Ryan Matthias) for the vacant titles.
December 7	Alpha Sigma Sigman (Brent Oakley and KC Jacobs)	Season Finale	This was a No Rope Barbwire match.

PWR Remix Championship
Incoming champion – Alex Shelley
Date	Winner	Event/Show	Note(s)
March 16	Vacated	Ready or Not!	Vacated after Shelley had won the REVOLVER Championship
March 16	Gringo Loco	Ready or Not!	Won a seven-way scramble also involving Damian Chambers, Jake Crist, Kevin Knight, Myron Reed, Warhorse, and Brent Oakley, to win the vacant PWR Remix Championship.
August 24	Lince Dorado	Taste of Truth	
December 7	Jake Something	Season Finale	This was an Open Scramble match also involving Crash Jaxon, Damian Chambers, JJ Garrett, and Ryan Matthias.

=== ROH ===
ROH World Championship
Incoming champion – Eddie Kingston
Date	Winner	Event/Show	Note(s)
April 5	Mark Briscoe	Supercard of Honor	
October 23	Chris Jericho	AEW Dynamite	This was an All Elite Wrestling (AEW) event. This was also a Ladder War.

ROH World Television Championship
Incoming champion – Kyle Fletcher
Date	Winner	Event/Show	Note(s)
June 28	Atlantis Jr.	CMLL Super Viernes	First time the title changed hands at a Consejo Mundial de Lucha Libre (CMLL) event.
October 12	Brian Cage	WrestleDream; Zero Hour	This was an All Elite Wrestling (AEW) event.
December 20	Komander	Final Battle	This was a Survival of the Fittest match also involving AR Fox, Blake Christian, Mark Davis, and Willie Mack.

ROH Pure Championship
Incoming champion – Wheeler Yuta
Date	Winner	Event/Show	Note(s)
July 26	Lee Moriarty	Death Before Dishonor	

ROH Women's World Championship
Incoming champion – Athena
No title changes.

ROH Women's World Television Championship
(Title created)
Date	Winner	Event/Show	Note(s)
April 5	Billie Starkz	Supercard of Honor	Defeated Queen Aminata in a tournament final to become the inaugural champion.
July 26	Red Velvet	Death Before Dishonor	

ROH World Tag Team Championship
Incoming champions – The Undisputed Kingdom (Matt Taven and Mike Bennett)
Date	Winner	Event/Show	Note(s)
August 17	The Sons of Texas (Dustin Rhodes and Sammy Guevara)	AEW Collision	This was an All Elite Wrestling (AEW) event.

ROH World Six-Man Tag Team Championship
Incoming champions – The Mogul Embassy (Brian Cage and Gates of Agony (Jasper Kaun and Toa Liona))
Date	Winner	Event/Show	Note(s)
January 17	Bullet Club Gold / Bang Bang Gang (Jay White, Austin Gunn, and Colten Gunn)	AEW Dynamite	This was an All Elite Wrestling (AEW) event. During this reign, the group was renamed to Bang Bang Gang.
From April 21 until July 10 (aired July 13), the AEW World Trios Championship and the ROH World Six-Man Tag Team Championship were held and defended together as the Unified World Trios Championship.
July 10 (aired July 13)	Vacated	AEW Collision	This was an All Elite Wrestling (AEW) show. Bang Bang Gang (Jay White, Austin Gunn, and Colten Gunn) were stripped of the Unified World Trios Championship by interim AEW Executive Vice President Christopher Daniels after White suffered an injury and denied Bang Bang Gang's attempt to invoke the Freebird Rule to allow Juice Robinson to defend the title in place of White. This subsequently ended the unification with the AEW World Trios Championship.
July 27	The Sons of Texas (Dustin Rhodes and The Von Erichs (Marshall Von Erich and Ross Von Erich))	AEW Battle of the Belts XI	This was an All Elite Wrestling (AEW) event. Defeated The Undisputed Kingdom (Matt Taven, Mike Bennett, and Roderick Strong) to win the vacant title.

=== Seadlinnng ===
Beyond the Sea Single Championship
Incoming champion – Sareee
Date	Winner	Event/Show	Note(s)

Beyond the Sea Tag Team Championship
Incoming champion – Vacant
Date	Winner	Event/Show	Note(s)
March 15	Las Fresa de Egoistas (Makoto and Nagisa Nozaki)	Shin-Kiba Series 2024 Vol. 2	
August 23	Ayame Sasamura and Itsuki Aoki	Seadlinnng 9th Anniversary: Arisa Nakajima Retirement	

=== Senjo ===
Sendai Girls World Championship
Incoming champion – Mika Iwata
Date	Winner	Event/Show	Note(s)
July 15	Saori Anou	Sendai Girls	This was a winner takes all match in which Iwata's Wonder of Stardom Championship was also on the line
September 13	Mika Iwata	Sendai Girls	
November 17	Dash Chisako	Sendai Girls	

Sendai Girls Junior Championship
Incoming champion – Vacant
Date	Winner	Event/Show	Note(s)
November 9	Chi Chi	Sendai Girls Big Show In Niigata	Defeated Yuna to win the vacant title.

Sendai Girls Tag Team Championship
Incoming champion – Team 200kg (Chihiro Hashimoto and Yuu)
Date	Winner	Event/Show	Note(s)
February 20	Reiwa Ultima Powers (Dash Chisako and Hiroyo Matsumoto)	Sendai Girls	
March 17	Manami and Ryo Mizunami	Sendai Girls	
July 15	Bob Bob Momo Banana (Mio Momono and Yurika Oka)	Sendai Girls	
September 27	Team 200kg (Chihiro Hashimoto and Yuu)	Sendai Girls	
November 9	Lena Kross and Veny	Sendai Girls Big Show In Niigata	

=== Stardom ===
World of Stardom Championship
Incoming champion – Maika
Date	Winner	Event/Show	Note(s)
July 28	Natsuko Tora	Sapporo World Rendezvous	
August 31	Tam Nakano	Stardom 5 Star Grand Prix Finals	
December 29	Saya Kamitani	Dream Queendom	

Wonder of Stardom Championship
Incoming champion – Saori Anou
Date	Winner	Event/Show	Note(s)
June 22	Mika Iwata	The Conversion	
July 15	Saori Anou	Sendai Girls	This was a Winner Takes All match also for Iwata's Sendai Girls World Championship. This is the first time the title changed hands on a Sendai Girls show.
July 27	Natsupoi	Sapporo Wonder Rendezvous	
December 29	Starlight Kid	Dream Queendom	

Goddesses of Stardom Championship
Incoming champions – AphrOditE (Utami Hayashishita and Saya Kamitani)
Date	Winner	Event/Show	Note(s)
March 30	Crazy Star (Suzu Suzuki and Mei Seira)	Stardom in Sendai	
May 5	Fukuoka Double Crazy (Hazuki and Koguma)	Stardom in Fukuoka	
June 29	God's Eye (Syuri and Konami)	Stardom in Korakuen Hall	
July 23	Oedo Tai / H.A.T.E. Supreme (Momo Watanabe and Thekla)	Stardom Nighter in Korakuen II	Oedo Tai folded at Sapporo World Rendezvous on July 28. Watanabe and Thekla later transferred to the newly created stable H.A.T.E. and competed under its banner ever since.
December 29	wing★gori (Hanan and Saya Iida)	Dream Queendom	

Artist of Stardom Championship
Incoming champions – Baribari Bombers (Giulia, Thekla, and Mai Sakurai)
Date	Winner	Event/Show	Note(s)
January 3	Abarenbo GE (Syuri, Mirai and Ami Sohrei)	New Year Stars	This was the finals of the Triangle Derby.
March 30	Empress Nexus Venus (Maika, Mina Shirakawa, and Xena)	Stardom in Sendai	
August 4	Cosmic Angels (Tam Nakano, Saori Anou and Natsupoi)	Stardom in Hamamatsu	

High Speed Championship
Incoming champion – Mei Seira
Date	Winner	Event/Show	Note(s)
April 4	Saki Kashima	American Dream in The Keystone State	This was a three-way match also involving Ram Kaicho.
April 27	Saya Kamitani	All Star Grand Queendom	This was a four-way match also involving Saya Iida and Fukigen Death.
July 27	Mei Seira	Sapporo World Rendezvous; Pre-Show	

Future of Stardom Championship
Incoming champion – Rina
Date	Winner	Event/Show	Note(s)
October 5	Miyu Amasaki	Nagoya Golden Fight	

New Blood Tag Team Championship
Incoming champions – wing★gori (Saya Iida and Hanan)
Date	Winner	Event/Show	Note(s)
July 23	Oedo Tai / Devil Princess (Rina and Azusa Inaba)	Stardom Nighter in Korakuen II	Oedo Tai folded at Sapporo World Rendezvous on July 28. Rina and Inaba later transferred to the newly created stable H.A.T.E. and competed under its banner ever since. Inaba was an associate of the stable before being made an official member on September 13.
December 26	Rice or Bread (Waka Tsukiyama and Hanako)	New Blood 17	

IWGP Women's Championship
Incoming champion – Mayu Iwatani
Co-promoted with New Japan Pro-Wrestling
No title changes.

Strong Women's Championship
Incoming champion – Giulia
Co-promoted with New Japan Pro-Wrestling
Date	Winner	Event/Show	Note(s)
March 10	Stephanie Vaquer	Cinderella Tournament; Night 2	
June 30	Mercedes Moné	Forbidden Door	This was a Winner Takes All match where Moné's AEW TBS Championship was also on the line.

=== Tenryu Project ===
Tenryu Project International Junior Heavyweight Championship
Incoming champions – Yuya Susumu
Date	Winner	Event/Show	Note(s)
August 23	Yusuke Kodama	Light My Fire Vol. 5	

Tenryu Project International Junior Heavyweight Tag Team Championship
Incoming champions – Keita Yano and Yuya Susumu
Date	Winner	Event/Show	Note(s)
February 19	Naoki Tanizaki and Yusuke Kodama	Still Revolution Vol. 10	
October 15	Yuya Susumu and Kengo	Light My Fire Vol. 7	

Tenryu Project WAR World 6-Man Tag Team Championship
Incoming champions – Kazuki Hashimoto and Okami (Daichi Hashimoto, Hideyoshi Kamitani)
Date	Winner	Event/Show	Note(s)
February 19	Minoru Suzuki, Yasshi, and Kengo	Still Revolution Vol. 10	This was a two-out-of-three falls match. Suzuki, Yasshi, and Kengo won 2–1.
September 18	Koji Iwamoto, Kouki Iwasaki, and Shigehiro Irie	Light My Fire Vol. 6	This was a two-out-of-three falls match. Iwamoto, Iwasaki, and Irie won 2–0.

United National Tag Team Championship
Incoming champions – Hideki Suzuki and Hikaru Sato
Date	Winner	Event/Show	Note(s)
October 15	Kohei Sato and Masayuki Kono	Light My Fire Vol. 7	

=== Impact/TNA ===
Impact World Championship
Incoming champion – Alex Shelley
On January 13, the title was renamed to the TNA World Championship after Impact Wrestling reverted to its original name of Total Nonstop Action Wrestling (TNA).
Date	Winner	Event/Show	Note(s)
January 13	Moose	Hard To Kill	Moose invoked his Feast or Fired world championship opportunity.
July 20	Nic Nemeth	Slammiversary	This was a six-way elimination match also involving Josh Alexander, Joe Hendry, Frankie Kazarian and Steve Maclin. Nemeth last elimimated Kazarian to win the title.

Impact X Division Championship
Incoming champion – Chris Sabin
On January 13, the title was renamed to the TNA X Division Championship after Impact Wrestling reverted to its original name of Total Nonstop Action Wrestling (TNA).
Date	Winner	Event/Show	Note(s)
February 23	Mustafa Ali	No Surrender	
July 20	Mike Bailey	Slammiversary	
August 30	Zachary Wentz	Emergence	This was an Ultimate X match also involving Hammerstone, Jason Hotch, Laredo Kid, and Riley Osborne.
September 13	Mike Bailey	Victory Road	
October 27 (aired November 7)	Moose	TNA Impact!	

Impact Knockouts World Championship
Incoming champion – Trinity
On January 13, the title was renamed to the TNA Knockouts World Championship after Impact Wrestling reverted to its original name of Total Nonstop Action Wrestling (TNA).
Date	Winner	Event/Show	Note(s)
January 13	Jordynne Grace	Hard To Kill	This was Grace's Call Your Shot championship match.
October 26	Masha Slamovich	Bound for Glory	

Impact World Tag Team Championship
Incoming champions – ABC (Ace Austin and Chris Bey)
On January 13, the title was renamed to the TNA World Tag Team Championship after Impact Wrestling reverted to its original name of Total Nonstop Action Wrestling (TNA).
Date	Winner	Event/Show	Note(s)
March 8	The System (Brian Myers and Eddie Edwards)	Sacrifice	
July 20	ABC (Ace Austin and Chris Bey)	Slammiversary	
September 13	The System (Brian Myers and Eddie Edwards)	Victory Road	
October 26	The Hardys (Matt Hardy and Jeff Hardy)	Bound for Glory	This was a Three-way Full Metal Mayhem match also involving ABC (Ace Austin and Chris Bey).

Impact Knockouts World Tag Team Championship
Incoming champions – MK Ultra (Killer Kelly and Masha Slamovich)
On January 13, the title was renamed to the TNA Knockouts World Tag Team Championship after Impact Wrestling reverted to its original name of Total Nonstop Action Wrestling (TNA).
Date	Winner	Event/Show	Note(s)
January 13	Decay (Havok and Rosemary)	Hard To Kill	
February 23	MK Ultra (Killer Kelly and Masha Slamovich)	No Surrender	
March 8	Spitfire (Dani Luna and Jody Threat)	Sacrifice	
May 3	The Malisha (Alisha Edwards and Masha Slamovich)	Under Siege	
September 13	Spitfire (Dani Luna and Jody Threat)	Victory Road	Defeated Slamovich and Tasha Steelz, the latter taking Alisha's place in defending the titles due to her being under concussion protocols. Had Spitfire lost, they would have had to disband.

Impact Digital Media Championship
Incoming champion – Tommy Dreamer
On January 13, the title was renamed to the TNA Digital Media Championship after Impact Wrestling reverted to its original name of Total Nonstop Action Wrestling (TNA).
Date	Winner	Event/Show	Note(s)
January 13	Crazzy Steve	Hard To Kill; Countdown	This was a No Disqualification match.
April 20	Laredo Kid	Rebellion; Countdown	
May 19 (aired June 6)	A. J. Francis	TNA Impact!	
July 20	PCO	Slammiversary	This was a Montreal Street Fight and was also for Francis' International Heavyweight Championship.

International Heavyweight Championship
(Title introduced)
On June 15, 2024, the Canadian International Heavyweight Championship was revived by Total Nonstop Action Wrestling (TNA) as the International Heavyweight Wrestling Championship, with A. J. Francis as the champion. Francis had bought the rights to the title and declared himself as champion.
Date	Winner	Event/Show	Note(s)
June 15 (aired June 27)	A. J. Francis	TNA Impact!	
July 20	PCO	Slammiversary	This was a Montreal Street Fight and was also for Francis' TNA Digital Media Championship.

=== West Coast Pro ===
West Coast Pro Wrestling Heavyweight Championship
Incoming champion – Starboy Charlie
Date	Winner	Event/Show	Note(s)
March 23	Kevin Blackwood	Marvelous Coast	
November 11	Titus Alexander	Noah Magic Monday Vol. 3	This was a Pro Wrestling Noah event.

West Coast Pro Wrestling Women's Championship
Incoming champion – Takumi Iroha
Date	Winner	Event/Show	Note(s)
October 11	Zara Zakher	The Thing That Should Not Be – 6 Year Anniversary Show	

West Coast Pro Wrestling Tag Team Championship
Incoming champion – Vacant
Date	Winner	Event/Show	Note(s)
March 23	Los Suavecitos (Danny Rose and Ricky Gee)	Marvelous Coast	Defeated Beef Tank (Beef and Calvin Tankman) to win the vacant titles.
October 11	The Crush Boys (Titus Alexander and Starboy Charlie)	The Thing That Should Not Be – 6 Year Anniversary Show	This was a San Francisco Street Fight.

=== WOS ===
WOS Championship
Incoming champion – Vacant
Date	Winner	Event/Show	Note(s)
September 14 (airing TBD)	Sha Samuels	WOS Wrestling	Defeated Adam Maxted to win the vacant title.

WOS Tag Team Championship
Incoming champions – Vacant
Date	Winner	Event/Show	Note(s)
September 14 (airing TBD)	UK Pitbulls (Bulk and Big Dave)	WOS Wrestling	Defeated CW Davies and Jack Landers to win the vacant titles.

WOS Women's Championship
Incoming champions – Vacant
Date	Winner	Event/Show	Note(s)
September 14 (airing TBD)	Alex Windsor	WOS Wrestling	Defeated LA Taylor in a tournament final to win the vacant title.

=== WOW ===
WOW World Championship
Incoming champion – The Beast
Date	Winner	Event/Show	Note(s)
August 3 (aired September 23)	Vacated	WOW: Season 10 Episode 11	The title was vacated after The Beast left WOW.
August 3 (aired January 11, 2025)	The Classmaster	WOW: Season 10 Episode 17	Last eliminated Tormenta in a 12-woman battle royal to win the vacant title.
August 16 (aired July 19, 2025)	Tormenta	WOW: Season 10 Episode 45	

WOW World Tag Team Championship
Incoming champions – Miami's Sweet Heat (Laurie Carlson and Lindsey Carlson)
Date	Winner	Event/Show	Note(s)
August 3 (aired November 30)	Big Rigs and Bourbon (Jessie Jones and Big Rig Betty)	WOW: Season 10 Episode 12	
August 9 (aired April 4, 2025)	The Fabulous Four (Penelope Pink and Holly Swag)	WOW: Season 10 Episode 30	This was a four-way tag team match, also involving Tormenta and Princess Aussie, and Miami's Sweet Heat (Laurie Carlson and Lindsey Carlson).
August 17 (aired October 4, 2025)	Miami's Sweet Heat (Laurie Carlson and Lindsey Carlson)	WOW: Season 11 Episode 4	This was a Steel Cage match.

WOW Trios Championship
Incoming champions – Top Tier (Coach Campanelli, Gloria Glitter, and Kandi Krush)
No title changes.

=== WWE ===
– Raw
– SmackDown
– NXT
– Unbranded

==== Raw and SmackDown ====
Raw and SmackDown each exclusively have a men's world championship, a women's world championship, a secondary men's championship, and a men's tag team championship.

World Heavyweight Championship
Incoming champion – Seth "Freakin" Rollins
Date	Winner	Event/Show	Note(s)
April 7	Drew McIntyre	WrestleMania XL; Night 2	
April 7	Damian Priest	WrestleMania XL; Night 2	This was Priest's Money in the Bank contract cash-in match.
August 3	Gunther	SummerSlam	

Undisputed WWE Universal Championship (WWE Championship and WWE Universal Championship)
Incoming champion – Roman Reigns
From April 3, 2022, until April 7, 2024, the WWE Championship and WWE Universal Championship were held and defended together as the Undisputed WWE Universal Championship.
Date	Winner	Event/Show	Note(s)
April 7	Cody Rhodes	WrestleMania XL; Night 2	This was a Bloodline Rules match. Rhodes won the title as a member of the Raw brand and was transferred to SmackDown shortly thereafter.
Upon Roman Reigns's loss on April 7, the WWE Universal Championship was retired and the WWE Championship subsequently became referred to as the Undisputed WWE Championship. (Note: WWE had originally listed Cody Rhodes as both WWE and Universal Champion until April 20, 2025, when he lost the title to John Cena. Upon Rhodes's defeat, the official title history for the Universal Championship was amended, removing Rhodes and officially recognizing Reigns as the final champion with the title's retirement being his loss at WrestleMania XL.)

Women's World Championship
Incoming champion – Rhea Ripley
Date	Winner	Event/Show	Note(s)
April 15	Vacated	Raw	Rhea Ripley was forced to relinquish the title due to a legitimate shoulder injury.
April 22	Becky Lynch	Raw	This was a 14-woman battle royal for the vacant title, in which Lynch last eliminated Liv Morgan to win.
May 25	Liv Morgan	King and Queen of the Ring	

WWE Women's Championship
Incoming champion – Iyo Sky
Date	Winner	Event/Show	Note(s)
April 7	Bayley	WrestleMania XL; Night 2	
August 3	Nia Jax	SummerSlam	

WWE Intercontinental Championship
Incoming champion – Gunther
Date	Winner	Event/Show	Note(s)
April 6	Sami Zayn	WrestleMania XL; Night 1	
August 3	Bron Breakker	SummerSlam	
September 23	Jey Uso	Raw	
October 21	Bron Breakker	Raw	

WWE United States Championship
Incoming champion – Logan Paul
Date	Winner	Event/Show	Note(s)
August 3	LA Knight	SummerSlam	
November 30	Shinsuke Nakamura	Survivor Series: WarGames	

WWE Women's United States Championship
(Title created)
Date	Winner	Event/Show	Note(s)
December 14	Chelsea Green	Saturday Night's Main Event	Defeated Michin in a tournament final to become the inaugural champion.

WWE Raw Tag Team Championship
Incoming champions – The Judgment Day (Finn Bálor and Damian Priest)
From May 20, 2022, until April 6, 2024, the Raw Tag Team Championship and SmackDown Tag Team Championship were held and defended together as the Undisputed WWE Tag Team Championship.
Date	Winner	Event/Show	Note(s)
April 6	Awesome Truth (The Miz and R-Truth)	WrestleMania XL; Night 1	This was a Six-Pack Tag Team Ladder match also involving A-Town Down Under (Austin Theory and Grayson Waller), #DIY (Johnny Gargano and Tommaso Ciampa), The New Day (Kofi Kingston and Xavier Woods), and New Catch Republic (Pete Dunne and Tyler Bate). This match was also for the WWE SmackDown Tag Team Championship, which was won by A-Town Down Under.
The title was renamed to the World Tag Team Championship on April 15.
June 24	The Judgment Day (Finn Bálor and JD McDonagh)	Raw	Bálor previously held the title twice as part of The Judgment Day with former stablemate Damian Priest.
December 16	The War Raiders (Erik and Ivar)	Raw	

WWE SmackDown Tag Team Championship
Incoming champions – The Judgment Day (Finn Bálor and Damian Priest)
From May 20, 2022, until April 6, 2024, the Raw Tag Team Championship and SmackDown Tag Team Championship were held and defended together as the Undisputed WWE Tag Team Championship.
Date	Winner	Event/Show	Note(s)
April 6	A-Town Down Under (Austin Theory and Grayson Waller)	WrestleMania XL; Night 1	This was a Six-Pack Tag Team Ladder match also involving Awesome Truth (The Miz and R-Truth), #DIY (Johnny Gargano and Tommaso Ciampa), The New Day (Kofi Kingston and Xavier Woods), and New Catch Republic (Pete Dunne and Tyler Bate). This match was also for the WWE Raw Tag Team Championship, which was won by Awesome Truth.
The title was renamed to the WWE Tag Team Championship on April 19.
July 5	#DIY (Johnny Gargano and Tommaso Ciampa)	SmackDown	
August 2	The Bloodline (Tama Tonga and Jacob Fatu/Tonga Loa)	SmackDown	Tama Tonga and Jacob Fatu originally won the title; however, on the August 23 episode of SmackDown, Bloodline leader Solo Sikoa had Fatu relinquish his share of the title to fellow group member Tonga Loa so that Fatu could be Sikoa's personal enforcer.
October 25	Motor City Machine Guns (Alex Shelley and Chris Sabin)	SmackDown	
December 6	#DIY (Johnny Gargano and Tommaso Ciampa)	SmackDown	

==== NXT ====
NXT exclusively has a primary championship, a secondary championship, a specialty championship, and a tag team championship for men, as well as a primary championship and a secondary championship for women.

NXT Championship
Incoming champion – Ilja Dragunov
Date	Winner	Event/Show	Note(s)
April 23	Trick Williams	NXT: Spring Breakin'; Week 1	Had Williams lost, he would have had to leave NXT.
July 7	Ethan Page	Heatwave	This was a fatal four-way match, also involving Shawn Spears and Je'Von Evans, the latter of whom Page pinned.
October 1	Trick Williams	NXT's CW Network Premiere; Week 1	CM Punk was the special guest referee.

NXT Women's Championship
Incoming champion – Lyra Valkyria
Date	Winner	Event/Show	Note(s)
April 6	Roxanne Perez	Stand & Deliver	

NXT North American Championship
Incoming champion – Dragon Lee
Date	Winner	Event/Show	Note(s)
January 9	Oba Femi	NXT	This was Femi's NXT Breakout Tournament contract cash-in match.
October 8	Tony D'Angelo	NXT's CW Network Premiere; Week 2	

NXT Women's North American Championship
(Title created)
Date	Winner	Event/Show	Note(s)
June 9	Kelani Jordan	Battleground	This was a six-woman ladder match to determine the inaugural champion, also involving Sol Ruca, Lash Legend, Fallon Henley, Jaida Parker, and Michin.
October 27	Fallon Henley	Halloween Havoc	This was a Spin the Wheel, Make the Deal: Spinner's Choice Gauntlet match that also featured Henley's Fatal Influence stablemates Jazmyn Nyx and Jacy Jayne.

NXT Heritage Cup
Incoming champion – Noam Dar
Date	Winner	Event/Show	Note(s)
February 27	Charlie Dempsey	NXT	Won 2–1. While Dempsey was the official champion, any member of the No Quarter Catch Crew (Dempsey, Drew Gulak, Damon Kemp, and Myles Borne) was allowed to defend the cup under the "Catch Clause".
May 14	Tony D'Angelo	NXT	Won 2–1. Dempsey represented the No Quarter Catch Crew.
August 13	Charlie Dempsey	NXT	Won 2–1.
December 17 (aired December 24)	Lexis King	NXT	Won 1–0 by disqualification.

NXT Tag Team Championship
Incoming champions – The D'Angelo Family (Tony D'Angelo and Channing "Stacks" Lorenzo)
Date	Winner	Event/Show	Note(s)
February 13	Bron Breakker and Baron Corbin	NXT	
April 9	Nathan Frazer and Axiom	NXT	Had Frazer and Axiom lost, they would have had to disband as a team.
August 13	Chase U (Andre Chase and Ridge Holland)	NXT	Andre Chase previously held the title as part of Chase U with stablemate Duke Hudson.
September 1	Nathan Frazer and Axiom	No Mercy	

==== Unbranded ====
These titles are non-exclusive, available to wrestlers from all three of WWE's brands.

WWE Women's Tag Team Championship
Incoming champions – Katana Chance and Kayden Carter
Date	Winner	Event/Show	Note(s)
January 26	The Kabuki Warriors (Asuka and Kairi Sane)	SmackDown	The Kabuki Warriors won the titles as members of the SmackDown brand, but were drafted to Raw as a result of the WWE Draft.
May 4	Bianca Belair and Jade Cargill	Backlash France	
June 15	The Unholy Union (Alba Fyre and Isla Dawn)	Clash at the Castle: Scotland	This was a triple threat tag team match, also involving the team of Shayna Baszler and Zoey Stark. Dawn pinned Baszler to win the title.
August 31	Bianca Belair and Jade Cargill/Naomi	Bash in Berlin	Belair had originally won the title with Cargill; however, after Cargill suffered an injury, she was replaced by Naomi on the December 20 episode of SmackDown (taped December 13); WWE considers this a single uninterrupted reign.

WWE Speed Championship
(Title created)
Date	Winner	Event/Show	Note(s)
April 26 (aired May 3)	Ricochet	Speed	Defeated Johnny Gargano in a tournament final to become the inaugural champion.
June 7 (aired June 14)	Andrade	Speed	
November 15 (aired November 20)	Dragon Lee	Speed	

WWE Women's Speed Championship
(Title created)
Date	Winner	Event/Show	Note(s)
October 4 (aired October 9)	Candice LeRae	Speed	Defeated Iyo Sky in a tournament final to become the inaugural champion.

=== wXw ===
wXw Unified World Wrestling Championship
Incoming champion – Robert Dreissker
Date	Winner	Event/Show	Note(s)
June 1	Laurance Roman	Drive of Champions	This was a lumberjack match.
October 5	Peter Tihanyi	World Tag Team Festival; Night 2	This was a three-way match also involving Robert Dreissker.

wXw Shotgun Championship
Incoming champion – The Rotation
Date	Winner	Event/Show	Note(s)
March 9	Levaniel	16 Carat Gold Tournament; Night 1	This was a three-way match also involving Maggot.
October 6	Anita Vaughan	World Tag Team Festival; Night 3	

wXw European Championship
(Title created)
Date	Winner	Event/Show	Note(s)
July 20	Aigle Blanc	Wrestling EM	Defeated Mike D Vecchio in a tournament final to become the inaugural champion.
October 5	Mike D Vecchio	World Tag Team Festival; Night 2	

wXw World Tag Team Championship
Incoming champions – Cash & Hektor (Dennis Dullnig and Hektor Invictus)
Date	Winner	Event/Show	Note(s)
October 4	KXS (Axel Tischer and Fast Time Moodo)	World Tag Team Festival; Night 1	This was a first-round match in the World Tag Team Festival tournament.
October 6	Young Blood (Oskar Leube and Yuto Nakashima)	World Tag Team Festival; Night 3	This was the final of the World Tag Team Festival tournament, a three-way elimination tag team match also involving 1 Called Manders and Thomas Shire.

wXw Academy Championship
Incoming champion – Danny Fray
Date	Winner	Event/Show	Note(s)
February 21	Tatsuya Hanami	Wrestling Im Hagenbusch	
March 10	Marc Empire	We Love Wrestling	This was a four-way match also involving Danny Fray and Axel Fox.
November 20	Vacated	–	
November 20	Emilian Lewis	Heat in Der wXw Academy	Defeated Dieter Schwartz, Emil Völler, Hunyadi Tamas, and Leon Cage in a five-way dance to win the vacant title.
December 4	M4	Heat in Der wXw Academy	

=== XPW ===
XPW World Heavyweight Championship
Incoming champion – Shlak
Date	Winner	Event/Show	Note(s)
April 13	Eric Ryan	Baptized in Blood 4	This was a Title vs. Career match.

XPW West Coast Heavyweight Championship
(Title introduced)
Date	Winner	Event/Show	Note(s)
September 7	Necro Butcher	Symphony of Destruction	Defeated Bad Dude Tito to become the inaugural champion.

XPW King of the Deathmatch Championship
Incoming champion – Shlak
Date	Winner	Event/Show	Note(s)
January 27	Vacated	–	Vacated due to Shlak also holding the XPW World Heavyweight Championship
February 25	Homeless Jimmy	Alive and Kicking	Defeated Dr. Redacted, Eric Dillinger, Eric Ryan, Judge Joe Dred, MAGA Butcher, Mickie Knuckles, and Tarzan Duran in a Hellsgate Gauntlet match to win the vacant title.

XPW Women's Championship
Incoming champion – Mickie Knuckles
No title changes.

XPW TV Championship
Incoming champion – Kat Martini
No title changes.

=== Zero1 ===
==== Zero1 Japan ====
World Heavyweight Championship
Incoming champion – Chris Vice
Date	Winner	Event/Show	Note(s)
March 31	Akitoshi Saito	Noto Peninsula Earthquake Charity Pro Wrestling	
July 13	Go Shiozaki	Noah Destination	This was a Pro Wrestling Noah event.

World Junior Heavyweight Championship
Incoming champion – Takumi Baba
Date	Winner	Event/Show	Note(s)
March 3 (aired March 10)	Seiki Yoshioka	Zero1 23rd Anniversary	This was a Winner Takes All match also for Baba's International Junior Heavyweight Championship

International Junior Heavyweight Championship
Incoming champion – Takumi Baba
Date	Winner	Event/Show	Note(s)
March 3 (aired March 10)	Seiki Yoshioka	Zero1 23rd Anniversary	This was a Winner Takes All match also for Baba's World Junior Heavyweight Championship

Intercontinental Tag Team Championship
Incoming champions – Kubota Brothers (Hide Kubota and Yasu Kubota)
Date	Winner	Event/Show	Note(s)
January 1 (aired January 7)	Junya Matsunaga and Tsugutaka Sato	Happy New Year & Do Your Best! Shinjiro Otani Aid	
March 20	Kengo Mashimo and Naka Shuma	2AW Grand Slam In Korakuen Hall	This was an Active Advance Pro Wrestling event. This was a Winner Takes All match in which Mashimo and Shunma's 2AW Tag Team Championship were also on the line.

==== Zero1 USA ====
Zero1 USA Heavyweight Championship
Incoming champion – Mad Dog Conelly
Date	Winner	Event/Show	Note(s)

Zero1 USA TNT Championship
Incoming champion – B. A. Malkin
No title changes.

Zero1 USA World Junior Heavyweight Championship
Incoming champion – DaCobra
Date	Winner	Event/Show	Note(s)
January 20	Victor Analog	New Year's Retribution	This was a four-way match also featuring Gary Jay and Warhorse, the latter of whom Analog pinned.
January 20	DeVonte Knox	New Year's Retribution	Knox cashed in his “any title, anywhere, anytime” contract.
N/A	Joey O'Riley	N/A	

Zero1 USA Tag Team Championship
Incoming champions – The Light (Hippie Johnny and The Luminary)
Date	Winner	Event/Show	Note(s)
August 17	Nihilation (Jake Parnell and Victor Analog)	Vurbmoto: Summer Slam	

Zero1 USA Shining Light Championship
Incoming champion – Benjamin Trust
No title changes.

==== Super Fireworks Pro ====
Blast King Championship
Incoming champion – Taru
No title changes.

Blast Queen Championship
Incoming champion – Aja Kong
No title changes.

Blast King Tag Team Championship
Incoming champions – Revengers (Masato Tanaka and Hide Kubota)
No title changes.

== Awards and honors ==
=== AAA Hall of Fame ===
Inductee
Nicho el Millonario

=== Cauliflower Alley Club ===
Award	Recipient(s)
Iron Mike Mazurki Award	Sting
Lou Thesz/Art Abrams Lifetime Achievement Award	Kurt Angle
Men's Wrestling Award	Buff Bagwell
Women's Wrestling Award	Allison Danger
Tag Team Award	The Dudley Boyz (Bubba Ray Dudley and D-Von Dudley)
Lucha Libre Award	Negro Casas
Independent Wrestling Award	"Night Train" Gary Jackson
Jim Ross Announcers' Award	Jim Ross
Karl Lauer Independent Promoter Award	David McLane
James C. Melby Historian Award	Jason Presley
Charlie Smith Referee Award	Bill Alfonso
Courage Award	Black Bart
REEL Award	Todd Bridges
Red Bastien Friendship Award	Lori McGee Hurst

=== DPW ===
==== DPW Awards ====
Category	Winner
Wrestler of the Year	Jake Something
Tag Team of the Year	Speedball x Something (Mike Bailey and Jake Something)
Breakout Star of the Year	LaBron Kozone
Moment of the Year	Jake Something wins the DPW Worlds Championship at Super Battle
Match of the Year	Speedball x Something (Mike Bailey and Jake Something) (c) vs. Violence is Forever (Dominic Garrini and Kevin Ku) for the DPW Worlds Tag Team Championship at 3rd Anniversary
Event of the Year	Super Battle

=== ESPN ===
==== ESPN Pro Wrestling Awards ====
Award	Winner
Men's Wrestler of the Year	Gunther
Women's Wrestler of the Year	Roxanne Perez and "Timeless" Toni Storm
Tag Team of the Year	Nathan Frazer and Axiom
Debut Wrestler of the Year	Jacob Fatu
Breakout Wrestler of the Year	Swerve Strickland
Rivalry of the Year	CM Punk vs. Drew McIntyre
Best Promo Artist	Drew McIntyre
Match of the Year	Bryan Danielson vs. Will Ospreay at Dynasty
Best PPV/PLE Event of the Year	WrestleMania XL

=== Fightful ===
==== Fightful Awards ====
Award	Winner
Men’s Overall Performer of the Year	Cody Rhodes
Women’s Overall Performer of the Year	"Timeless" Toni Storm
Men’s In-Ring Wrestler of the Year	Will Ospreay
Women’s In-Ring Wrestler of the Year	Athena
Men's Tag Team of the Year	Fraxiom (Nathan Frazer and Axiom)
Women's Tag Team of the Year	Bianca Belair and Jade Cargill
Trio/Stable of the Year	The New Bloodline
Indie Act of the Year	Matt Cardona
Rookie of the Year	Izzy Moreno
Funniest Wrestler of the Year	Chelsea Green and Harley Cameron
Big Boss Man Memorial "Hater" of the Year	Drew McIntyre
Manager of the Year	Prince Nana
Announcer of the Year	Nigel McGuinness
Men's Best of Promos	"Hangman" Adam Page
Women’s Best of Promos	"Timeless" Toni Storm
Best Individual Promo	"Hangman" Adam Page: "You get to say goodbye to Swerve's House" on Dynamite (September 4)
Finisher of the Year	Tsunami (Bronson Reed)
Gear of the Year	Sting and his sons, Garrett and Steven, at Revolution
Best Talent Media of the Year	Hey! (EW) (RJ City)
Booker of the Year	Triple H
Moment of the Year	Cody Rhodes "Finishes the Story," wins the Undisputed WWE Championship at WrestleMania XL (Night 2)
Storyline/Feud of the Year	"Hangman" Adam Page vs. Swerve Strickland
Men's Match of the Year	Bryan Danielson vs. Will Ospreay at Dynasty
Women's Match of the Year	Mercedes Moné (c) vs. Hazuki for the Strong Women's Championship at Strong Style Evolved
Tag Team Match of the Year	Darby Allin and Sting (c) vs. The Young Bucks (Matthew Jackson and Nicholas Jackson) in a tornado tag team match for the AEW World Tag Team Championship at Revolution
Event of the Year	WrestleMania XL (Night 2)
Promotion of the Year	WWE
Documentary/Film of the Year	Bray Wyatt: Becoming Immortal
Wrestling News Story of the Year	Vince McMahon steps down amid lawsuit

=== George Tragos/Lou Thesz Professional Wrestling Hall of Fame ===
Category	Inductee
Singles Inductee	Greg Gagne
Frank Gotch Award	Arn Anderson
James C. Melby Award	Al Getz
Lou Thesz Award	Tito Santana
George Tragos Award	Don Frye
Gordon Solie Award	Tony Schiavone
Jack Brisco Spotlight Award	Tony Garea
Verne Gagne Trainer Award	Tom Prichard
Impact Award	Tim Dalton

=== GCW ===
==== Indie Wrestling Hall of Fame ====
Category	Inductee	Inducted by
Individual	Trent Acid	Johnny Kashmere
Individual	Kevin "Whack Packer" Hogan	Emil Jay
Individual	Steve Corino	Colby Corino
Individual	Sabu	N/A
Individual	Mercedes Martinez	Lexie Fyfe
Individual	Eddie Gilbert	Missy Hyatt
Group	The Briscoe Brothers (Jay Briscoe and Mark Briscoe)	Emil Jay

==== Deathmatch Hall of Fame ====
Inductee
Abdullah the Butcher
Markus Crane
Gary Walter

=== Hardcore Hall of Fame ===
Inductees	Inducted by
Team 3D (Brother Ray and Brother Devon)	The Sandman and Stevie Richards

=== International Professional Wrestling Hall of Fame ===
Category	Inductees
Individual	El Santo
Individual	Dusty Rhodes
Individual	Kurt Angle
Individual	Harley Race
Individual	Jack Brisco
Individual	Ad Santel
Excelsior Award	Bill Apter
Rocky Johnson Award	Korey Wise
Trailblazer Award	Mario Savoldi

=== Marigold ===
==== Dream★Star GP Awards ====
Award	Winner
Dream League Best Match Award	Kouki Amarei vs. Mirai on September 20
Star League Best Match Award	Nanae Takahashi vs. Sareee on September 23
Fighting Spirit Award	Miku Aono
Outstanding Performance Award	Bozilla
Skill Award	Victoria Yuzuki

==== Marigold Year-End Awards ====
Award	Winner
MVP Award	Sareee
Best Tag Team Award	MiraiSaku (Mirai and Mai Sakurai)
Fighting Spirit Award	Bozilla
Outstanding Performance Award	Utami Hayashishita
SHINE Award	Kouki Amarei
Technique Award	Miku Aono
Best Match Award	Sareee (c) vs. Nanae Takahashi for the Marigold World Championship at Winter Wonderful Fight (Night 2)

=== Memphis Wrestling Hall of Fame ===
Category	Inductees
Singles	Jimmy Valiant
Singles	Sir Mo
Singles	Tom Prichard
Singles	Dirty White Boy
Singles	Nightmare Danny Davis
Singles	The Spellbinder
Singles	Michael Saint John
Singles	Terry Golden
Group	The Rock 'n' Roll Express (Ricky Morton and Robert Gibson)
Group	PG-13 (J. C. Ice and Wolfie D)

=== NJPW ===
==== NJPW Concurso (Best Body) ====
Winner
Drilla Moloney

=== Pro Wrestling Illustrated ===
==== Yearly Rankings ====
List	Ranked No. 1
PWI 500	Cody Rhodes
PWI Women's 250	Toni Storm
PWI Tag Team 100	Bianca Belair and Jade Cargill

==== Pro Wrestling Illustrated awards ====
Category	Winner
Wrestler of the Year	Cody Rhodes
Woman of the Year	Toni Storm
Tag Team of the Year	Bianca Belair and Jade Cargill
Faction of the Year	The Bloodline
Match of the Year	Roman Reigns (c) vs. Cody Rhodes in a Bloodline Rules match for the Undisputed WWE Universal Championship on Night 2 of WrestleMania XL
Feud of the Year	CM Punk vs. Drew McIntyre
Most Popular Wrestler of the Year	Cody Rhodes
Most Hated Wrestler of the Year	Dominik Mysterio
Comeback of the Year	Liv Morgan
Most Improved Wrestler of the Year	Mariah May
Indie Wrestler of the Year	Mustafa Ali
Inspirational Wrestler of the Year	Cody Rhodes
Rookie of the Year	Kelani Jordan
Stanley Weston Award (Lifetime Achievement)	Booker T, Mickie James, Gail Kim, and Dave Meltzer

=== Sports Illustrated ===
==== Sports Illustrated Pro Wrestling Awards ====
Award	Winner
Men's Wrestler of the Year	Cody Rhodes
Women's Wrestler of the Year	"Timeless" Toni Storm
Tag Team of the Year	Nathan Frazer and Axiom
Breakout Star of the Year	Jacob Fatu
Rivalry of the Year	CM Punk vs. Drew McIntyre
Best on the Mic	Drew McIntyre
Storyline of the Year	The Bloodline
Heel Turn of the Year	Kofi Kingston and Xavier Woods kick Big E out of The New Day
Match of the Year	Bryan Danielson vs. Will Ospreay at Dynasty
Show of the Year	WrestleMania XL
Promotion of the Year	WWE

=== St. Louis Wrestling Hall of Fame ===
Category	Inductee
Singles	Bob Orton Jr.
Singles	Harold Koplar
Singles	George Abel
Singles	Wendi Richter
Group	The Glamour Girls (Leilani Kai and Judy Martin)

=== Stardom ===
==== 5★Star GP Awards ====
Award	Winner
Blue Stars Best Match Award	Blue Stars A: Saori Anou vs. Starlight Kid on August 15
Blue Stars Best Match Award	Blue Stars B: Suzu Suzuki vs. Thekla on August 20
Red Stars Best Match Award	Red Stars A: Maika vs. Hazuki on August 23
Red Stars Best Match Award	Red Stars B: Mayu Iwatani vs. Momo Watanabe on August 15
Fighting Spirit Award	AZM
Outstanding Performance Award	Hanan
Technique/Skill Award	Starlight Kid

==== Stardom Year-End Awards ====
Award	Winner
Best Match Award	Mayu Iwatani (c) vs. Momo Watanabe for the IWGP Women's Championship at Historic X-Over 2
Best Tag Team Award	wing★gori (Hanan and Saya Iida)
Best Technique Award	Mei Seira
Best Unit Award	Cosmic Angels
Fighting Spirit Award	Momo Watanabe
MVP Award	Maika
Outstanding Performance Award	Saori Anou
Shining Award	Starlight Kid
Special Merit Award	Saya Kamitani and Mina Shirakawa

=== TNA ===
==== TNA Hall of Fame ====
Inductee	Inducted by
Rhino	Tommy Dreamer
Bob Ryder	Eric Young

==== TNA Year End Awards ====
Award	Winner
Male Wrestler of the Year	Joe Hendry
Knockouts of the Year	Jordynne Grace
Tag Team of the Year	ABC (Ace Austin and Chris Bey)
Moment of the Year	Joe Hendry Goes Viral
X Division Star of the Year	Mustafa Ali
Match of the Year	Jordynne Grace (c) vs. Masha Slamovich for the TNA Knockouts World Championship at Bound for Glory
One to Watch in 2025	Leon Slater
Knockouts Tag Team of the Year	Spitfire (Dani Luna and Jody Threat)

=== Tokyo Sports ===
==== Tokyo Sports Puroresu Awards ====
Award	Winner
MVP Award	Zack Sabre Jr.
Best Bout Award	Hirooki Goto vs. Yota Tsuji in the New Japan Cup Finals (March 20)
Outstanding Performance Award	Yuma Anzai
Fighting Spirit Award	Kaito Kiyomiya
Technique Award	Shinya Aoki
Best Tag Team Award	Saito Brothers (Jun Saito and Rei Saito)
Newcomer Award	Boltin Oleg
Women's Wrestling Grand Prize	Sareee
Topic Award	Dump Matsumoto, Bull Nakano, and Mayu Iwatani

=== Women's Wrestling Hall of Fame ===
Category	Inductee
Pro Wrestler	Candi Devine
Pro Wrestler	Debbie Johnson
Pro Wrestler	Heidi Lee Morgan
Pro Wrestler	Jacqueline Moore
Pro Wrestler	June Byers
Pro Wrestler	Lisa Marie Varon
Pro Wrestler	Melissa Coates
Pro Wrestler	Nicole Bass
Pro Wrestler	Peggy Lee Leather
Pro Wrestler	Rockin' Robin
Pro Wrestler	Sherri Martel
Pro Wrestler	Suzie Tanner
Pro Wrestler	Vivian Vachon
Valets/Referees/Managers/Promoters	Baby Doll
Valets/Referees/Managers/Promoters	Francine
Valets/Referees/Managers/Promoters	Mike McGuirk
Valets/Referees/Managers/Promoters	Missy Hyatt
Valets/Referees/Managers/Promoters	Ken Resnick
Amateur	Afsoon Roshanzamir Johnson
Amateur	Clarissa Chun
Amateur	Priscilla Gagné
Group	The Texas Cowgirls (Joyce Grable and Wendi Richter)
Promotion	LPWA

==== WWHOF Awards ====
Award	Recipient
Pro Wrestler of the Year	Natalia Markova
Tag Team of the Year	Miami's Sweet Heat (Laurie Carlson and Lindsey Carlson)
Most Improved Wrestler of the Year	Ruby Soho
Most Inspirational Wrestler of the Year	Gisele Shaw
Broadcaster of the Year	Nigel Sherrod
Courage Award	Athena H. Gaskins
Historian Award	Billy Corgan
Podcast of the Year	The Mike Rand Show
Journalism Award	Kimmy Sokol
Amateur Wrestler of the Year	Justina Di Stasio
Coach of the Year	Paulina Biega
Pride Award	Sonny Kiss

=== Wrestling Observer Newsletter ===
==== Wrestling Observer Newsletter Hall of Fame ====
Category	Inductee
Individual	Roman Reigns
Individual	Shingo Takagi
Individual	Paul Orndorff
Individual	Johnny Rougeau
Individual	Cima
Individual	Johnny Saint
Individual	Bobby Davis
Group	The Young Bucks (Matt Jackson and Nick Jackson)
Group	Los Hermanos Dinamita (Cien Caras, Máscara Año 2000, and Universo 2000)

==== Wrestling Observer Newsletter awards ====
Category	Winner
Lou Thesz/Ric Flair Award (Wrestler of the Year)	Cody Rhodes
Most Outstanding Wrestler	Will Ospreay
Tag Team of the Year	The Young Bucks (Matthew Jackson and Nicholas Jackson)
Best on Interviews	Drew McIntyre
Promotion of the Year	WWE
Best Weekly TV Show	AEW Dynamite
Match of the Year	Bryan Danielson vs. Will Ospreay at Dynasty
United States/Canada MVP	Cody Rhodes
Koichi Yoshizawa Award (Japan MVP)	Zack Sabre Jr.
Mexico MVP	Místico
Europe MVP	Michael Oku
Danny Hodge Memorial Award (Non-Heavyweight MVP)	Darby Allin
Women's Wrestler MVP	Sareee
Best Box Office Draw	Cody Rhodes
Feud of the Year	CM Punk vs. Drew McIntyre
Most Improved	Kyle Fletcher
Most Charismatic	The Rock
Bryan Danielson Award (Best Technical Wrestler)	Zack Sabre Jr.
Bruiser Brody Award (Best Brawler)	"Hangman" Adam Page
Best Flying Wrestler	Will Ospreay
Most Overrated	Nia Jax
Most Underrated	Konosuke Takeshita
Rookie of the Year	Je'Von Evans
Best Non-Wrestler	Paul Heyman
Best Teleivision Announcer	Nigel McGuinness
Worst Television Announcer	Booker T
Best Major Wrestling Show	Revolution
Worst Major Wrestling Show	Triplemanía XXXII: Monterrey
Best Wrestling Maneuver	Hidden Blade (Will Ospreay)
Most Disgusting Promotional Tactic	WWE's continued relationship with Saudi Arabia
Worst Television Show	AEW Rampage
Worst Match of the Year	Jey Uso vs. Jimmy Uso on Night 1 of WrestleMania XL
Worst Feud of the Year	MJF vs. "The Devil" (Adam Cole)
Worst Promotion of the Year	National Wrestling Alliance
Best Booker	Paul Levesque
Promoter of the Year	Nick Khan
Best Gimmick	"Timeless" Toni Storm
Worst Gimmick	The Learning Tree
Best Pro Wrestling Book	The Man: Not Your Average Average Girl by Becky Lynch
Best Pro Wrestling DVD/Streaming Documentary	Mr. McMahon

=== wXw ===
==== wXw Hall of Fame ====
Inductee
Absolute Andy

=== WWE ===
==== WWE Hall of Fame ====
Category	Inductee	Inducted by
Individual	Paul Heyman	Roman Reigns
Individual	Bull Nakano	Alundra Blayze
Individual	Thunderbolt Patterson	Scott Spears and The New Day (Big E, Kofi Kingston, and Xavier Woods)
Individual	Lia Maivia	The Rock
Group	The U.S. Express (Barry Windham and Mike Rotunda)	Bo Dallas and Mika Rotunda
Celebrity	Muhammed Ali	The Undertaker

==== WWE Slammy Awards ====
Category	Winner
Male Superstar of the Year	Cody Rhodes
Female Superstar of the Year	Rhea Ripley
NXT Superstar of the Year	Tiffany Stratton
Faction of the Year	The Judgment Day
Breakout Superstar of the Year	LA Knight
Social Superstar of the Year	Drew McIntyre
Rivalry of the Year	Roman Reigns vs. Cody Rhodes
Return of the Year	CM Punk
Best Entrance	Cody Rhodes
OMG Moment of the Year	CM Punk returns to WWE at Survivor Series: WarGames 2023
Match of the Year	Charlotte Flair (c) vs. Rhea Ripley for the WWE SmackDown Women's Championship at WrestleMania 39 (Night 1)
Mic Drop of the Year	Paul Heyman telling Cody Rhodes that his father, Dusty Rhodes, told him that "Roman Reigns was the son he always wanted" on Raw (February 6, 2023)
Fan Chant of the Year	"Yeah!" – LA Knight
Rizzie of the Year	Seth "Freakin" Rollins
Villain of the Year	"Dirty" Dominik Mysterio
Trash Talker of the Year	The Rock

==== WWE Match of the Year ====
Winner	Event	Date
Roman Reigns (c) vs. Cody Rhodes in a Bloodline Rules match for the Undisputed WWE Championship	WrestleMania XL (Night 2)	April 7, 2024

==== NXT Year-End Awards ====
Award	Winner
Male Superstar of the Year	Oba Femi
Female Superstar of the Year	Roxanne Perez
Tag Team of the Year	Nathan Frazer and Axiom
Moment of the Year	Joe Hendry in NXT (June 18–September 1)
Match of the Year	Oba Femi (c) vs. Josh Briggs vs. Dijak for the NXT North American Championship at Stand & Deliver
Best PLE/Show of The Year	Stand & Deliver

== Debuts ==
- January 6 – Ezekiel Balogun (NXT) and Drake Stewart (NXT)
- February 4 – Mizuha (JTO)
- February 10 – Isuzu (JTO)
- February 17 – Josh Black (NXT)
- February 25 – Kaisei Takechi (Dramatic Dream Team)
- March 13 - Erii Kanae (ChocoPro)
- March 17 – Tsubasa Suzuki (Dramatic Dream Team)
- March 24 – Hinata Senya (ActWresGirl'Z)
- March 29 – Vincent Winey (NXT)
- March 30 – Tamyra Mensah-Stock (NXT) and Rian (Stardom)
- April 20 – Anthony Luke (NXT)
- May 10 – Jumbo Inoue (JTO) and Sexy BJ Ray (NXT)
- May 18 – Derrian Gobourne (NXT)
- May 30 – Hiyori Yawata (ChocoPro)
- June 8 – Destinee Brown (NXT) and Ajiea Lee Hargrave (NXT)
- June 11 – Komomo Minami (Marigold)
- June 18 – Daiki Nagai (NJPW) and Masatora Yasuda (NJPW)
- July 14 – Kirari Wakana (Ice Ribbon)
- July 20 – Naoto Inoki (Backyard Squabbles)
- August 11 - Jenne (Pure-J)
- August 14 – Alice Aono (ActWresGirl'Z) and Erisa Nagai (ActWresGirl'Z)
- August 20 – Ren Sukegawa (HEAT UP)
- August 29 – Big Haruka (JTO)
- September 1 – Miyuna (Evolution)
- September 5 – Homare Kato (Dragon Gate)
- September 14 – Daiki Odashima (NOAH)
- October 22 – Taishin Nagao (AJPW)
- October 27 – Senka Akatsuki (Marvelous)
- November 2 – Jamar Hampton (WWE)
- November 16 – Matoi Hamabe (Stardom)
- November 18 – Noa Hinata (LLPW-X)
- December 10 – Elijah Holyfield (WWE)
- December 19 – Jin Tala (WWE) and Chris Island (WWE)
- December 24 (unofficial) – Trainee Akira and Trainee Yuria (Stardom)
- December 26 – Nagisa Tachibana (Marigold) and Ryoko Sakimura (Marigold)

== Retirements ==
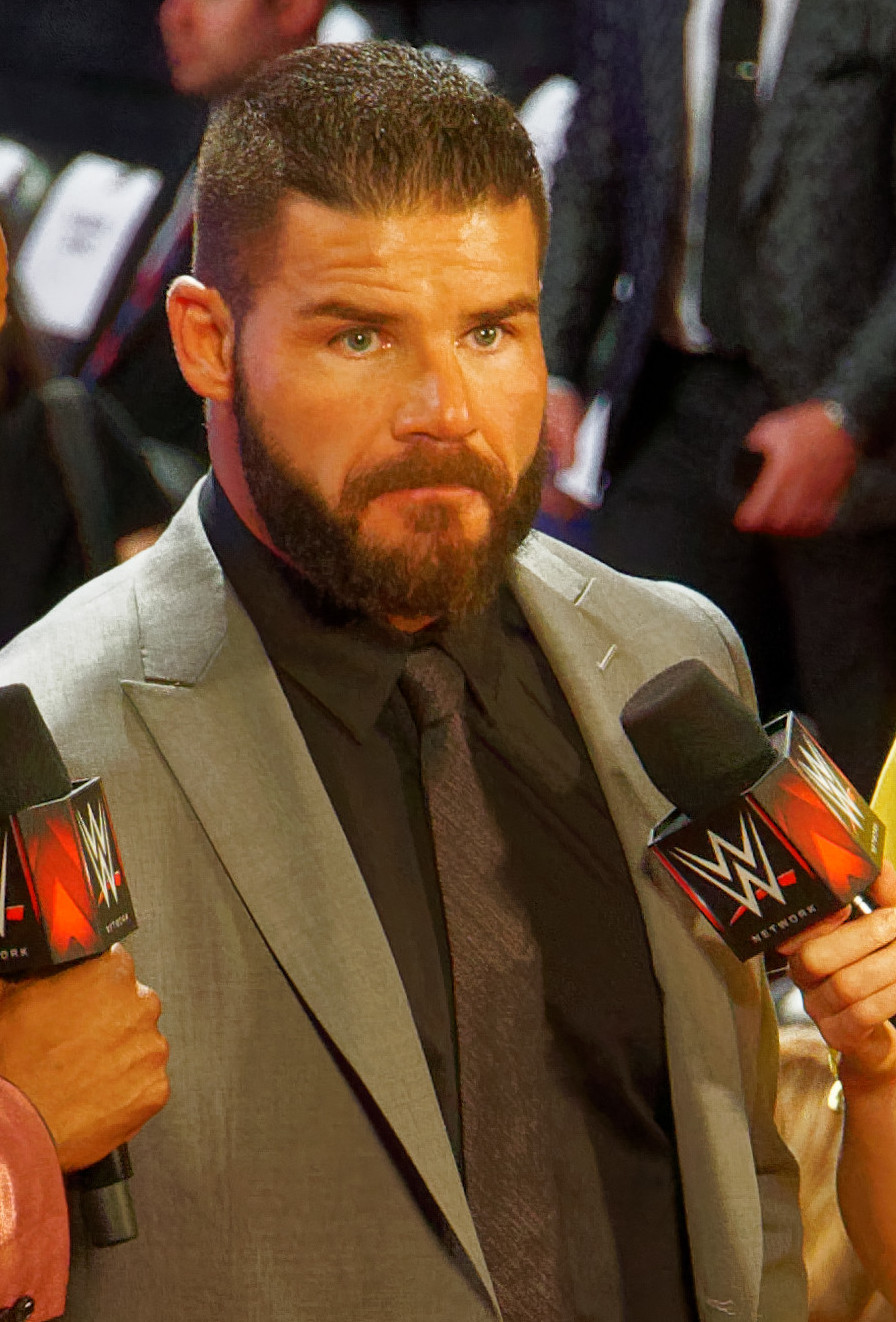
Bobby Roode

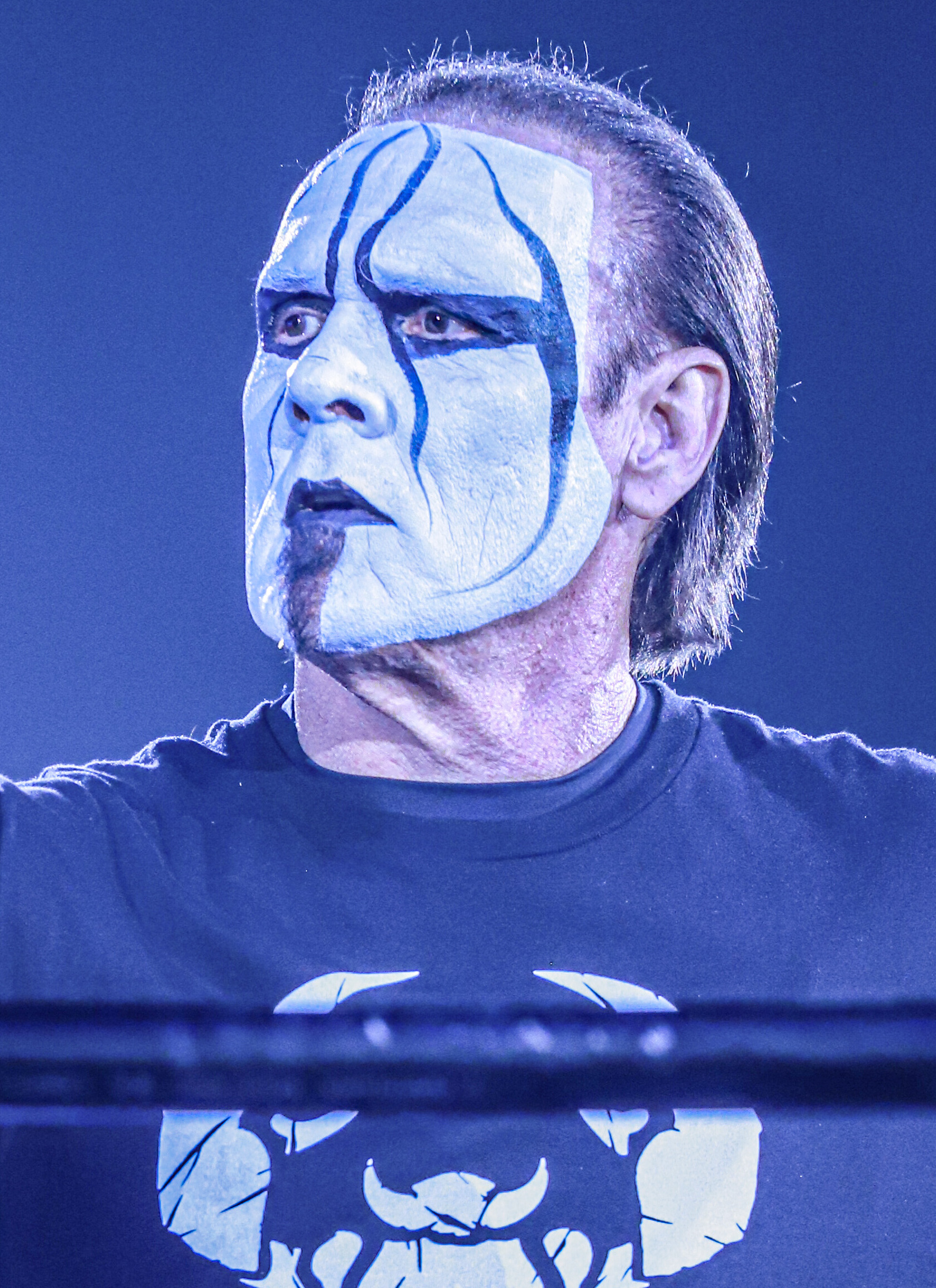
Sting

- February 5 – Michael Elgin
- February 7 – Yukio Sakaguchi
- February 22 – Bobby Roode
- March 3 – Sting
- March 23 – Alex Coughlin
- July 1 – Kaz Hayashi
- July 25 – Nao Kakuta
- August 12 – Yuki Ishikawa
- August 13 – Yoshinari Ogawa
- August 23 – Arisa Nakajima
- October 23 – Aaron Mercer
- October 30 – Tucker Knight
- November 10 – Vampiro
- November 16 – Sawyer Wreck
- November 17 – Akitoshi Saito
- December 17 – Kono Mama Ichikawa

== Deaths ==
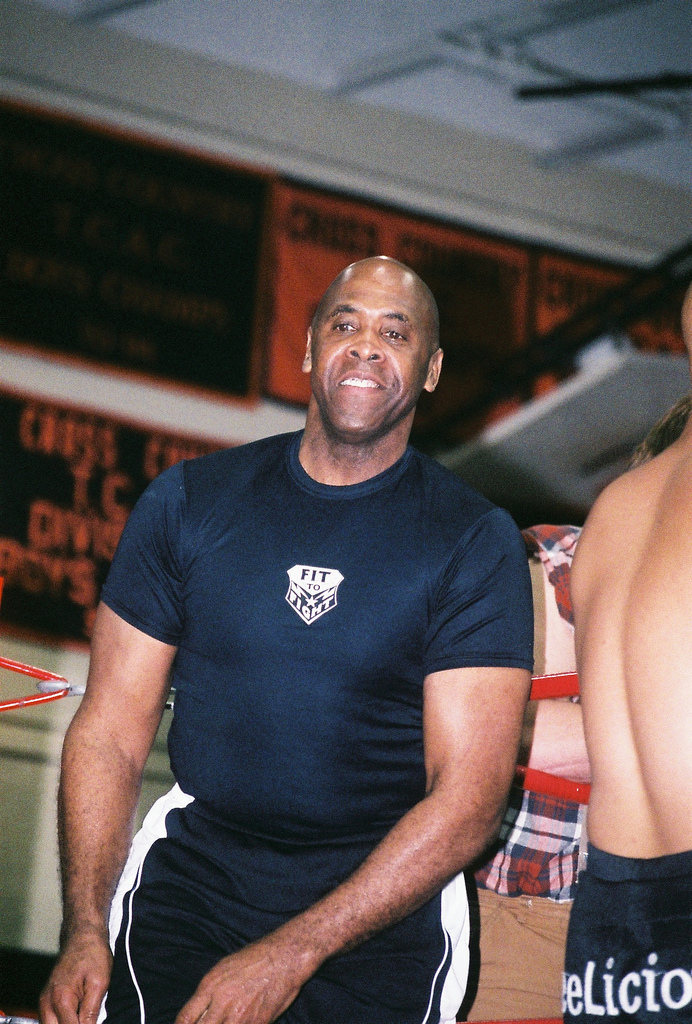
Virgil

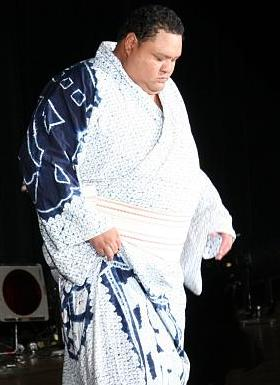
Akebono Tarō

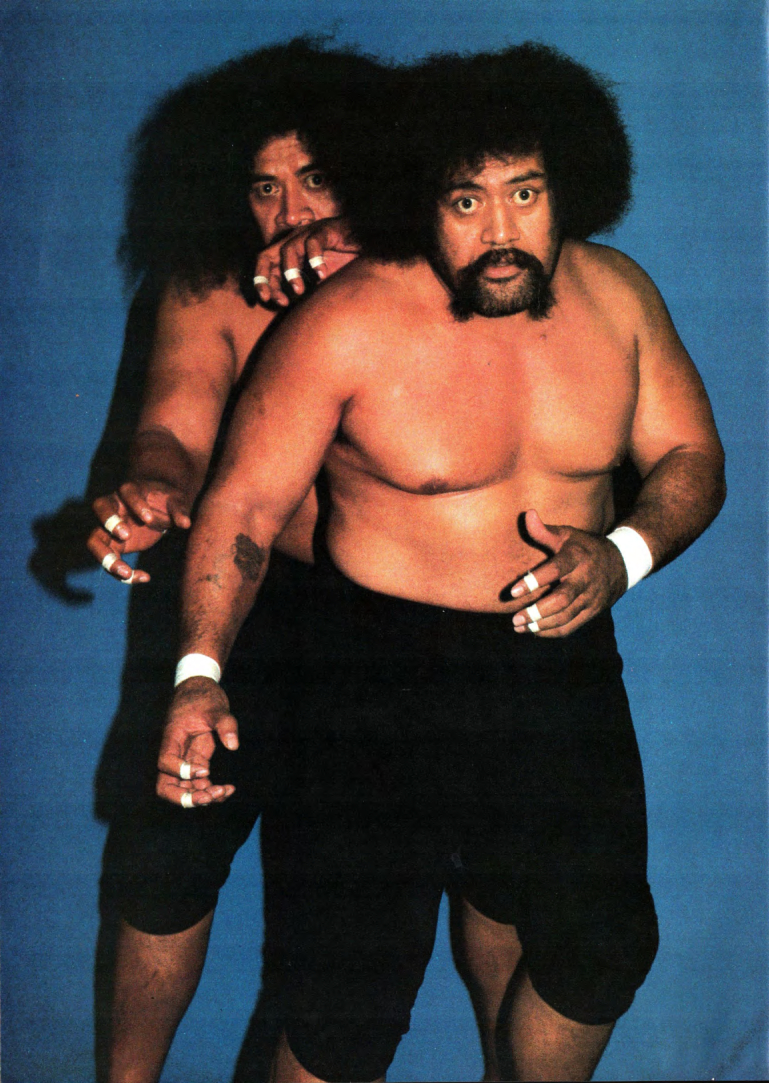
The Wild Samoans (Afa Anoa'i and Sika Anoa'i)

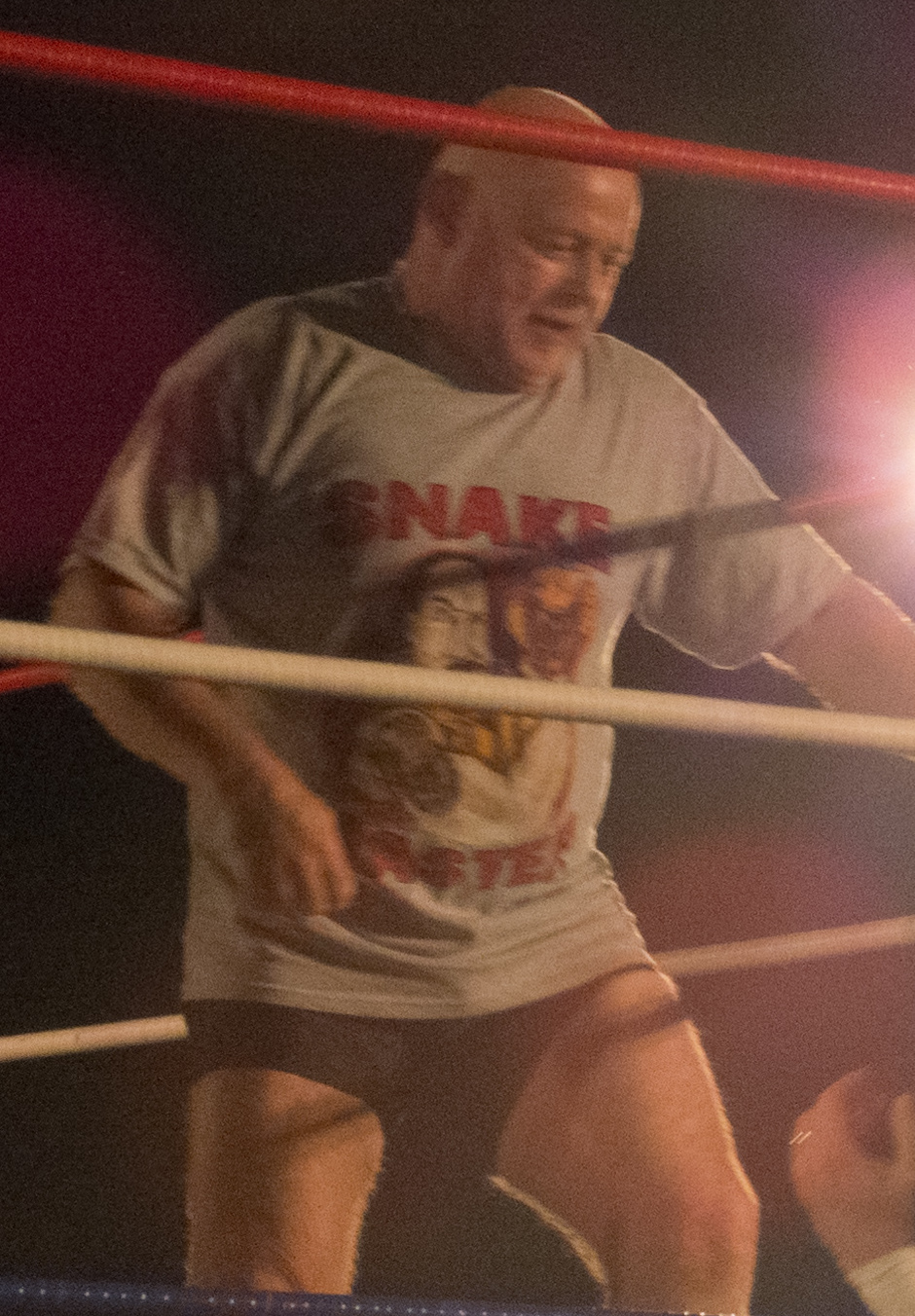
Kevin Sullivan

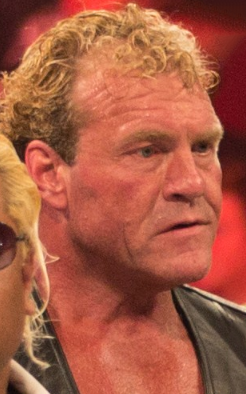
Sid Eudy

- January 20 – Francisco Ciatso (born 1975)
- January 22 – Mongolian Mauler (born 1961)
- January 23 – Ice Train (born 1967)
- February 1 – Asahi (born 2002)
- February 10 – Chris Markoff (born 1938)
- February 26 – Ole Anderson (born 1942)
- February 28 – Virgil (born 1951)
- February 29 – Butcher Vachon (born 1937)
- March 10 – Yutaka Yoshie (born 1974)
- March 29 – Silver Cat (born 1970)
- April 6 – Akebono Tarō (born 1969)
- April 7 – Silento Rodriguez (born 1933)
- April 11 – Tony Jones (born 1971)
- April 29 – Billy Reil (born 1979)
- May 10 – Bob Bruggers (born 1944)
- May 18 – Pequeño Nitro (born 1984)
- May 20 – Bad Bones (born 1984)
- June 5 – El Signo (born 1954)
- June 15 – James Castle (born 1988)
- June 16 – Scott Henson (born 1984)
- June 25 – Sika Anoa‘i (born 1945)
- June 26 – Louie Tillet (born 1934)
- July 24
  - Larry Pitchford (born 1936)
  - Leo Burke (born 1948)
- July 27
  - Pete Sanchez (born 1943)
  - Vladimir Petrov (born 1957)
- August 9 – Kevin Sullivan (born 1949)
- August 13 – Fritz Von Goering (born 1930)
- August 16 – Afa Anoa‘i (born 1942)
- August 19 – Mosco de la Merced (born 1964)
- August 26 – Sid Eudy (born 1960)
- August 29 – Villano V (born 1960)
- August 31 – Sonny King (born 1945)
- September 9 – Kuniaki Kobayashi (born 1956)
- September 12 – Micah Taylor (born 1977)
- September 30 – Pete Rose (born 1941)
- October 15 - Joe Koff (born 1951)
- November 7 – Scorpio Jr. (born 1966)
- November 13 – Brian Maxine (born 1938)
- November 16 – Coloso Colosetti (born 1948)
- November 26 – Scott L. Schwartz (born 1959)
- November 27 – Mighty Inoue (born 1949)
- December 13 – Karloff Lagarde Jr. (born 1970)
- December 20 – Rey Misterio (born 1958)
- December 25 – Jax Dane (born 1981)
- December 31 – Sweet Daddy Siki (born 1933)

== See also ==
- List of WWE pay-per-view and livestreaming supercards, WWE Raw special episodes, WWE SmackDown special episodes, and WWE NXT special episodes
- List of AEW pay-per-view events, AEW special events, and AEW Dynamite special episodes
- List of TNA pay-per-view events and TNA+ Monthly Specials
- List of ROH pay-per-view events and Honor Club exclusive events
- List of NWA pay-per-view events and NWA Pop-Up Event
- List of MLW events
- List of major NJPW events and NJPW Strong special episodes
- List of major World Wonder Ring Stardom events
- List of major Progress Wrestling events
- List of major Pro Wrestling Noah events
- List of major DDT Pro-Wrestling events
- List of major Lucha Libre AAA Worldwide events
