= Progress Chapter 171: History Is Written By The Victors =

2024 Progress Wrestling event

Chapter 171: History Is Written By The Victors
- Promotional poster of the event
- Promotion: Progress Wrestling
- Date: September 22, 2024
- City: London, England
- Venue: Electric Ballroom

Event chronology
| ← Previous; Chapter 170: Wrestling Never Sleeps | Next → Progress x Noah x DEFY |

The Chapter 171: History Is Written By The Victors was a professional wrestling event produced by Progress Wrestling. It took place on September 22, 2024, in London, England at Electric Ballroom.

Nine matches were contested at the event. The main event saw Luke Jacobs defeat Eddie Dennis to retain the PROGRESS World Championship.

== Production ==
=== Storylines ===
The event included matches that each resulted from scripted storylines, where wrestlers portrayed heroes, villains, or less distinguishable characters in scripted events that built tension and culminated in a wrestling match or series of matches. Results were predetermined by Progress' creative writers, while storylines were produced on Progress' events airing on the Demand PROGRESS streaming service.

The event also featured the in-ring return of Cara Noir who made an appearance at Chapter 170: Wrestling Never Sleeps.

=== Event ===
In the first match of the event, Lykos Gym (Kid Lykos and Kid Lykos II) defeated Gene Munny and Taishi Ozawa in tag team action. In the second bout, Allie Katch picked up a victory over Lizzy Evo in singles competition. The third bout saw All Elite Wrestling's Marina Shafir successfully defending the DEFY Women's Championship against Kanji and Nina Samuels in a three-way match. Next up, Rhio defeated Emersyn Jayne to secure the fourteenth consecutive defense of the Progress World Women's Championship in that respective reign. After the bout concluded, Rhio got attacked by Lizzy Evo who demanded a title match. Next up, Paul Robinson defeated Connor Mills to secure the tenth consecutive defense of the Progress Proteus Championship in that respective reign. After the bout concluded, Simon Miller made a return and stepped up as Robinson's next challenger. In the seventh bout, Cara Noir defeated Yoshiki Inamura in singles competition. In the semi main event, Tate Mayfais defeated Mike Bird who substituted 1 Called Manders in singles competition.

In the main event, Luke Jacobs defeated Eddie Dennis to secure the third consecutive defense of the PROGRESS World Championship in that respective reign.

== Results ==
| No. | Results | Stipulations |
|---|---|---|
| 1 | Lykos Gym (Kid Lykos and Kid Lykos II) defeated Gene Munny and Taishi Ozawa by pinfall | Tag team match |
| 2 | Allie Katch defeated Lizzy Evo by pinfall | Singles match |
| 3 | Marina Shafir (c) defeated Nina Samuels and Kanji by pinfall | Three-way match for the DEFY Women's Championship |
| 4 | Smokin' Aces (Charlie Sterling and Nick Riley) defeated Sanity (Big Damo and Axel Tischer) (c) by pinfall | Street Fight for the PROGRESS Tag Team Championship |
| 5 | Rhio (c) defeated Emersyn Jayne by pinfall | Singles match for the Progress World Women's Championship |
| 6 | Paul Robinson (c) defeated Connor Mills by pinfall | Singles match for the Progress Proteus Championship |
| 7 | Cara Noir defeated Yoshiki Inamura by pinfall | Singles match |
| 8 | Tate Mayfairs defeated Mike Bird by pinfall (Note: Bird replaced 1 Called Manders.) | Singles match |
| 9 | Luke Jacobs (c) defeated Eddie Dennis by pinfall | Singles match for the PROGRESS World Championship |
(c) / – the champion(s) heading into the match
