= DEFY x Progress Onslaught =

2024 Progress Wrestling and DEFY Wrestling co-promoted event

- Promotional poster of the event
- Promotion(s): Progress Wrestling; DEFY Wrestling
- Date: November 29 and December 1, 2024
- City: Brooklyn, New York City, New York; Chicago, Illinois
- Venue: Roulette Intermedium; Thalia Hall
- Attendance: cca. 100 (Night 1) cca. 150 (Night 2)

Event chronology
← Previous; Progress; Chapter 174: Vendetta 2 DEFY; DDT x TJPW x DEFY Triangler DTD	Next → Progress; Chapter 175: Unboxing VII: The Curtain Call; DEFY; DEFY Blueprint

DEFY x Progress chronology
← Previous; Progress x Noah x DEFY	Next → —

DEFY x Progress Onslaught was a two-night professional wrestling event co-promoted by Progress Wrestling and DEFY Wrestling. It took place on November 29 and December 1, 2024, at the Roulette Intermedium (in Brooklyn) and at Thalia Hall (in Chicago). Both nights of the event were streamed live on Triller TV.

The card comprised a total of 15 matches, with eight on the first night and seven on the second. In the main event for both nights, Luke Jacobs successfully retained the PROGRESS World Championship, defeating Kevin Knight and Man Like DeReiss respectively.

== Production ==
=== Storylines ===
The event included matches that each resulted from scripted storylines, where wrestlers portrayed heroes, villains, or less distinguishable characters in scripted events that built tension and culminated in a wrestling match or series of matches. Results were predetermined by Progress' creative writers, while storylines were produced on Progress' events airing on the Demand PROGRESS streaming service.

== Night 1 ==
=== Event ===
The first night took place on November 29, 2024, at the Roulette Intermedium in Brooklyn, NY. The event started with the tag team confrontation between The Mane Event (Jay Lyon and Midas Black) and Los Desperados (Arez and Gringo Loco), solded with the victory of the latter team. In the second bout, Marina Shafir defeated Allie Katch to retain the DEFY Women's Championship. Next up, Homicide picked up a victory over Tate Mayfairs by countout in singles competition. The fourth bout saw Simon Miller defeating Dark STG to secure the second consecutive defense of the Progress Proteus Championship in that respective reign. The fifth bout saw Rhio defeating Zayda Steel to secure the 18th consecutive defense of the Progress World Women's Championship in that respective reign. Next up, Man Like DeReiss defeated KC Navarro in singles competition. In the semi main event, Mustafa Ali picked up a victory over Cara Noir in another singles competition.

In the main event, Luke Jacobs defeated Kevin Knight to secure the seventh consecutive defense of the PROGRESS World Championship in that respective reign.

=== Results ===
Night 1 (November 29)
No.	Results	Stipulations	Times
1	Los Desperados (Arez and Gringo Loco) defeated The Mane Event (Jay Lyon and Midas Black) by pinfall	Tag team match	13:20
2	Marina Shafir (c) defeated Allie Katch by submission	Singles match for the DEFY Women's Championship	10:19
3	Homicide defeated Tate Mayfairs by countout	Singles match	4:30
4	Simon Miller (c) defeated Dark STG by pinfall	Singles match for the Progress Proteus Championship	4:03
5	Rhio (c) defeated Zayda Steel by pinfall	Singles match for the Progress World Women's Championship	12:49
6	Man Like DeReiss defeated KC Navarro by pinfall	Singles match	16:17
7	Mustafa Ali defeated Cara Noir by pinfall	Singles match	17:06
8	Luke Jacobs (c) defeated Kevin Knight by pinfall	Singles match for the PROGRESS World Championship	15:50
(c) / – the champion(s) heading into the match

== Night 2 ==
=== Event ===
The second night took place on December 1, 2024, at the Thalia Hall in Chicago, IL. The event started with Simon Miller picking up a victory over Broski Jimmy to retain the Progress Proteus Championship for the third time consecutively in that respective reign. Next up, Russ Jones and Schaff defeated Chuck Mambo and TK Cooper to retain the AAW Tag Team Championship. The third bout saw Cara Noir defeating Timothy Thatcher in singles competition. In the fourth bout, Rhio defeated Vert Vixen to secure the 19th consecutive defense of the Progress World Women's Championship in that respective reign. Next up, Arez and Gringo Loco defeated Cody Chhun and Guillermo Rosas to win the DEFY Tag Team Championship. In the semi main event, Mustafa Ali outmatched Kevin Knight in singles competition.

In the main event, Luke Jacobs defeated Man Like DeReiss to secure the eighth consecutive defense of the PROGRESS World Championship in that respective reign.

=== Results ===
Night 2 (December 1)
No.	Results	Stipulations	Times
1	Simon Miller (c) defeated Broski Jimmy Lloyd by pinfall	Singles match for the Progress Proteus Championship	6:00
2	Schaff and Russ Jones (c) defeated Sunshine Machine (Chuck Mambo and TK Cooper) by pinfall	Tag team match for the AAW Tag Team Championship	13:55
3	Cara Noir defeated Timothy Thatcher by submission	Singles match	13:40
4	Rhio (c) defeated Vert Vixen by countout	Singles match for the Progress World Women's Championship	16:54
5	Los Desperados (Arez and Gringo Loco) defeated C4 (Cody Chhun and Guillermo Rosas) (c) by pinfall	Tag team match for the DEFY Tag Team Championship	18:53
6	Mustafa Ali defeated Kevin Knight by pinfall	Singles match	17:00
7	Luke Jacobs (c) defeated Man Like DeReiss by pinfall	Singles match for the PROGRESS World Championship	20:38
(c) / – the champion(s) heading into the match
