= Progress Chapter 174: Vendetta 2 =

2024 Progress Wrestling event

Chapter 174: Vendetta 2
- Promotional poster of the event
- Promotion: Progress Wrestling
- Date: 24 November 2024
- City: London, England
- Venue: Electric Ballroom
- Attendance: cca. 500

Event chronology
| ← Previous; Chapter 173: Stay Young & Invincible | Next → DEFY x Progress Onslaught |

The Chapter 174: Vendetta 2 was a professional wrestling event produced by Progress Wrestling. It took place on 24 November 2024, in London, England, at the Electric Ballroom.

Eight matches were contested at the event. The main event saw Luke Jacobs defeat Leon Slater to retain the PROGRESS World Championship.

== Production ==
=== Storylines ===
The event included matches that each resulted from scripted storylines, where wrestlers portrayed heroes, villains, or less distinguishable characters in scripted events that built tension and culminated in a wrestling match or series of matches. Results were predetermined by Progress' creative writers, while storylines were produced on Progress' events airing on the Demand PROGRESS streaming service.

Cara Noir and El Hijo del Vikingo were initially scheduled to be part of the event's card, but the latter pulled out of the match due to injury.

=== Event ===
The event started with the singles confrontation between Man Like DeReiss and Ethan Allen which ended in a double countout. Next up, Emersyn Jayne licked up a victory over Lana Austin in singles competition. The third bout saw Simon Miller defeating Session Moth Martina, Gene Munny, and Will Kroos in a four-way bout to secure the first successful defense of the Progress Proteus Championship in that respective reign. In the fourth bout, Ricky Knight Jr. defeated Trent Seven in singles competition. Next up, Nina Samuels defeated Kanji in another singles competition bout. The sixth match saw Connor Mills and Nico Angelo outmatching Lykos Gym (Kid Lykos and Kid Lykos II) in tag team action. In the semi main event, Big Damo and Axel Tischer defeated Flash Morgan Webster and Mark Andrews in tag team competition.

In the main event, Luke Jacobs defeated Leon Slater to secure the sixth consecutive defense of the PROGRESS World Championship in that respective reign.

== Results ==
| No. | Results | Stipulations | Times |
|---|---|---|---|
| 1 | Man Like DeReiss vs. Ethan Allen ended in a double countout | Singles match | 14:26 |
| 2 | Emersyn Jayne defeated Lana Austin by pinfall | Singles match | 11:02 |
| 3 | Simon Miller (c) defeated Session Moth Martina, Gene Munny, and Will Kroos by pinfall | Four-way match for the Progress Proteus Championship | 10:09 |
| 4 | Ricky Knight Jr. defeated Trent Seven by pinfall | Singles match | 18:42 |
| 5 | Nina Samuels defeated Kanji by pinfall | Singles match | 11:53 |
| 6 | Connor Mills and Nico Angelo defeated Lykos Gym (Kid Lykos and Kid Lykos II) by submission | Tag team match | 9:09 |
| 7 | Sanity (Big Damo and Axel Tischer) defeated Subculture (Flash Morgan Webster and Mark Andrews) by pinfall | Tag team match | 10:15 |
| 8 | Luke Jacobs (c) defeated Leon Slater by pinfall | Singles match for the PROGRESS World Championship | 33:46 |
(c) / – the champion(s) heading into the match
