= Progress x Noah x DEFY =

2024 Progress Wrestling, Pro Wrestling NOAH and DEFY Wrestling co-promoted event

- Promotional poster of the event
- Promotion(s): Progress Wrestling; Pro Wrestling Noah; DEFY Wrestling
- Date: October 5, 2024
- City: Oberhausen, Germany
- Venue: Turbinenhalle Oberhausen

Event chronology
← Previous; Progress; Chapter 171: History Is Written By The Victors; NOAH; Star Navigation in Tokyo 2024; DEFY; By Design	Next → Progress; Chapter 172: Werewolves of London; NOAH; Star Navigation Premium: Akitoshi Saito Road Last; DEFY; DDT In Utero

DEFY x Progress chronology
← Previous; DEFY x Progress Toronto	Next → DEFY x Progress Onslaught

Progress x Noah x DEFY was a professional wrestling event co-promoted by Progress Wrestling, Pro Wrestling Noah and DEFY Wrestling. It took place on October 5, 2024, in Oberhausen, Germany at the Turbinenhalle Oberhausen. The event also featured wrestlers from Westside Xtreme Wrestling (wXw).

Six matches were contested at the event. The main event saw Luke Jacobs defeat Timothy Thatcher to retain the PROGRESS World Championship.

== Production ==
=== Storylines ===
The event included matches that each resulted from scripted storylines, where wrestlers portrayed heroes, villains, or less distinguishable characters in scripted events that built tension and culminated in a wrestling match or series of matches. Results were predetermined by Progress' creative writers, while storylines were produced on Progress' events airing on the Demand PROGRESS streaming service.

=== Event ===
The event started with the singles confrontation between Kid Lykos II and Gringo Loco, solded with the victory of the latter. Next up, Cara Noir defeated Taishi Ozawa by referee's decision in singles competition. In the third bout, Man Like DeReiss picked up a win over Arez, Látigo and Kid Lykos in a four-way match. The fourth bout saw Naomichi Marufuji defeating Progress Wrestling Atlas Champion Axel Tischer in a non-title confrontation. In the semi main event, Rhio defeated Stephanie Maze to secure the sixteenth consecutive defense of the Progress World Women's Championship in that respective reign.

In the main event, Luke Jacobs defeated Timothy Thatcher to secure the fourth consecutive defense of the PROGRESS World Championship in that respective reign.

== Results ==
No.	Results	Stipulations	Times
1	Gringo Loco defeated Kid Lykos II by pinfall	Singles match	9:08
2	Cara Noir defeated Taishi Ozawa by referee stoppage	Singles match	7:54
3	Man Like DeReiss defeated Arez, Látigo and Kid Lykos by pinfall	Four-way match	12:46
4	Naomichi Marufuji defeated Axel Tischer by pinfall	Singles match	13:53
5	Rhio (c) defeated Stephanie Maze by pinfall	Singles match for the Progress World Women's Championship	15:03
6	Luke Jacobs (c) defeated Timothy Thatcher by pinfall	Singles match for the PROGRESS World Championship	16:00
(c) / – the champion(s) heading into the match
