= Progress Chapter 199: Bonestorm =

2026 Progress Wrestling event

Chapter 199: Bonestorm
- Promotional poster of the event
- Promotion: Progress Wrestling
- Date: 25 October 2026
- City: Camden, London, England
- Venue: Electric Ballroom

Event chronology
← Previous; Chapter 198: When September Ends	Next → Chapter 200: Vendetta 4

Chapter 199: Bonestorm was a professional wrestling event produced by Progress Wrestling. It took place on 27 September 2026, at the Electric Ballroom in Camden, London, England.

== Production ==
=== Storylines ===
The event included matches that each resulted from scripted storylines, where wrestlers portrayed heroes, villains, or less distinguishable characters in scripted events that built tension and culminated in a wrestling match or series of matches. Results were predetermined by Progress' creative writers, while storylines were produced on Progress' events airing on the Demand PROGRESS streaming service.

=== Event ===
The event started with the tag team confrontation between Angel Hayze and Nikki Storm, and Alexxis Falcon and Myla Grace, solded with the victory of the latters. Next up, Tommy Tanner defeated Sha Samuels to secure the fifth consecutive defense of the Progress Atlas Championship in that respective reign. The next third bouts saw Paul Walter Hauser issue an open challenge in which he successfully defended the Progress Proteus Championship twice, once against Scott Oberman, and once against Cian Noonan. However, the challenge was answered for the third time by Dijak, who succeeded in taking the title off Hauser, ending the latter's reign at 556 days and seven defenses.

Next up, Kid Lykos and Kid Lykos II defeated Danny Black and Joe Lando to become number one contenders for the Progress Tag Team Championship on further notice. In the seventh bout, Eddie Kingston defeated Luke Jacobs in singles competition. In the semi main event, Raven Creed defeated Marz.

In the main event, Charles Crowley defeated Simon Miller, Gene Munny, Man Like DeReiss, Ricky Knight Jr., Drilla Moloney and Chris Ridgeway in a ThunderBastard match to become number one contender for the Progress World Championship.

== Results ==
No.	Results	Stipulations	Times
1	Alexxis Falcon and Myla Grace defeated Angel Hayze and Nikki Storm by pinfall	Tag team match	—
2	Tommy Tanner (c) defeated Sha Samuels by pinfall	Singles match for the Progress Atlas Championship	—
3	Paul Walter Hauser (c) defeated Scott Oberman by pinfall	Singles match for the Progress Proteus Championship	—
4	Paul Walter Hauser (with Scott Oberman) (c) defeated Cian Noonan by pinfall	Singles match for the Progress Proteus Championship	—
5	Dijak defeated Paul Walter Hauser (c) by pinfall	Open Challenge for the Progress Proteus Championship	—
6	Lykos Gym (Kid Lykos and Kid Lykos II) defeated CPF (Danny Black and Joe Lando) by pinfall	Tag team match to determine the #1 contender to the Progress Tag Team Championship	—
7	Eddie Kingston defeated Luke Jacobs by pinfall	Singles match	21:03
8	Raven Creed defeated Marz (Note: Creed was initially scheduled to face Rhio for the Progress Women's World Championship, but the latter pulled out due to injury.) by pinfall	Singles match	—
9	Charles Crowley defeated Simon Miller, Gene Munny, Man Like DeReiss, Ricky Knight Jr., Drilla Moloney and Chris Ridgeway by pinfall	ThunderBastard match to determine the #1 contender to the Progress World Championship	—
(c) / – the champion(s) heading into the match
