= Death Riders =

Professional wrestling stable

- The stable's logo

Statistics
- Name(s): Blackpool Combat Club; Death Riders
- Leader: Jon Moxley
- Members: See below
- Debut: March 6, 2022
- Years active: 2022–present

The Death Riders are a professional wrestling stable primarily based in All Elite Wrestling (AEW), who also appear in Consejo Mundial de Lucha Libre (CMLL), New Japan Pro-Wrestling (NJPW), and Ring of Honor (ROH). The stable consists of leader Jon Moxley, Wheeler Yuta, Claudio Castagnoli, Marina Shafir, Daniel Garcia, and Gabe Kidd. Moxley is the current AEW Continental Champion in his first reign, Kidd is the current IWGP Global Heavyweight Champion in his record-tying second reign, and Shafir is the current DEFY Women's Champion and Pro-Wrestling: EVE International Champion, both in her first reigns.

The group was formed in March 2022 as the Blackpool Combat Club and was originally a tag team consisting of Moxley and Danielson with William Regal, who began his career in Blackpool, as their manager. Regal left AEW in November 2022 and the stable betrayed Danielson in September 2024, being taken over by Moxley and changing its name to the Death Riders, before Moxley defeated Danielson to win his fourth AEW World Championship.

Several members of the group have won multiple championships across several promotions, including world titles like the AEW World Championship, IWGP Heavyweight Championship, CMLL World Heavyweight Championship, ROH World Championship, GCW World Championship and DEFY Women's Championship.

== Background ==
Bryan Danielson and Jon Moxley had their first interaction together in December 2007 when Danielson defeated Moxley at Mad-Pro Wrestling's (MPW) Rise Up event in Chillicothe, Ohio. This match was later referred to by Moxley in a February 2022 promo when the two began feuding with each other in AEW. They next met in August 2010 at Heartland Wrestling Association's (HWA) Road to Destiny event before Moxley challenged Danielson at Dragon Gate USA a month later. Danielson, who was employed by WWE under the ring name Daniel Bryan at the time, defeated Moxley during both matches. In 2011, Moxley signed with WWE and was renamed Dean Ambrose; he wrestled in its development territory, FCW, which later became NXT. He became a successful member of The Shield after his main roster debut, and would wrestle Bryan in various matches throughout the 2010s. Both men became successful world champions for WWE before reverting to their respective names after leaving WWE (Moxley in 2019 and Danielson in 2021) with both men joining AEW. During that period, prior to the Blackpool Combat Club's establishment, William Regal was also employed by WWE as a wrestler and general manager for NXT; during this time, he helped to train and teach both Danielson and Moxley, and even feuded with Moxley.

== History ==
=== Blackpool Combat Club (2022–2024) ===
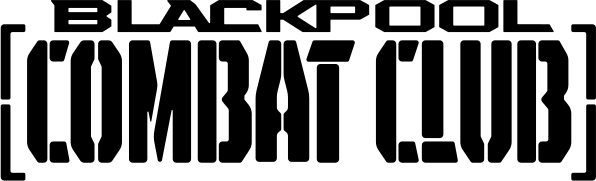
Original logo as the Blackpool Combat Club

==== Formation and various feuds (2022–2023) ====
On February 2, 2022, episode of Dynamite, Danielson told Moxley that he wanted to form a tag team, which Moxley accepted on the condition that they wrestle each other first. Danielson was defeated by Moxley at Revolution on March 6, after which the two began brawling. Regal, once a mentor to both men, made his AEW surprise debut to break up the fight and force them to shake hands. The two formed a team with Regal acting as their manager, later being named the Blackpool Combat Club (BCC) in honor of the English town where Regal began his career.

On April 8 episode of Rampage, Moxley defeated ROH Pure Champion Wheeler Yuta in a non-title match. After the match, Regal offered Yuta a handshake, and subsequently invited him to join the group, which Yuta accepted. At Double or Nothing on May 29, the BCC teamed with Eddie Kingston, Santana and Ortiz to face the Jericho Appreciation Society in an Anarchy in the Arena match, but lost.

At Forbidden Door on June 26, Claudio Castagnoli—who defeated Regal in his final match nine years prior—joined the BCC and made his surprise AEW debut as Danielson's handpicked replacement due to the latter suffering an injury, defeating Zack Sabre Jr. Later in the main event, Moxley defeated Hiroshi Tanahashi to win the interim AEW World Championship. The BCC would then team up again with Kingston, Santana and Ortiz, and beat the Jericho Appreciation Society in a Blood and Guts match at the eponymous event. At Death Before Dishonor on July 23, Castagnoli defeated Jonathan Gresham to capture the ROH World Championship.

On August 24 episode of Dynamite, Moxley quickly defeated lineal AEW World Champion CM Punk to win his record-setting second AEW World Championship, but lost it back to Punk at All Out on September 4. On the following episode of Dynamite, Yuta lost the ROH Pure Championship to Daniel Garcia, thus ending his reign at 159 days. Moxley and Danielson were inserted in the AEW Grand Slam Tournament of Champions to crown a new AEW World Champion as previous champion CM Punk was stripped of the title. At Grand Slam on September 21, Castagnoli lost the ROH World Championship to Chris Jericho, while Moxley defeated Danielson in the tournament final to win the vacant championship, becoming the first ever three-time AEW World Champion.

Alternate logo of the faction

At Full Gear on November 19, Moxley would lose the title to MJF after Regal secretly handed his signature brass knuckles to MJF to punch Moxley with while the referee was distracted, betraying the group and aligning himself with MJF. Just 11 days later, MJF betrayed Regal and severely injured him with the brass knuckles. Following this, it was reported that Regal was set to leave AEW; in-storyline, Regal revealed that he betrayed the BCC to teach them their final lesson, which was to never trust anyone. His last appearance was a pre-taped segment aired on December 7 episode of Dynamite. Despite Regal's betrayal and subsequent departure, the stable kept the "Blackpool" in their name.

On March 8, 2023, episode of Dynamite, Danielson announced that he would be going home to be with his family after his loss to MJF at Revolution. After Castagnoli and Moxley defeated The Dark Order members John Silver and Alex Reynolds, the three remaining BCC members continued their assault and attacked Dark Order members Evil Uno and Hangman Page, turning the stable fully heel for the first time. Danielson returned on March 29 episode of Dynamite, seemingly to convince his BCC teammates to stop their attack on Kenny Omega, but he instead joined them in attacking Omega and turned heel. On May 10 episode of Dynamite, during a steel cage match between Omega and Moxley, Omega's manager Don Callis betrayed Omega by stabbing him with a screwdriver and allowing Moxley to win. The Elite (Omega, Page, and The Young Bucks) challenged the BCC to an Anarchy in the Arena match at the Double or Nothing event on May 28, which the BCC won after assistance by Callis and Konosuke Takeshita, who attacked Omega during the final moments of the match, allowing Wheeler to get the pin on Omega. At Forbidden Door, the BCC teamed with Takeshita and Shota Umino in a losing effort against the team of The Young Bucks, Page, Eddie Kingston and Tomohiro Ishii, while Danielson defeated Kazuchika Okada by submission, despite suffering an arm injury that sidelined him for 3 months. The Blackpool Combat Club's feud with The Elite ended at Blood & Guts on July 19, where Moxley, Castagnoli and Yuta teamed up with Takeshita and Pac, in another loss to The Elite in a Blood and Guts match following Pac and Takeshita leaving the match. After Blood & Guts, the group transitioned into tweeners.

==== Championship reigns and pursuits (2023–2024) ====
Following their feud with The Elite, at All In on August 27, the BCC teamed with Santana and Ortiz to face Eddie Kingston, Penta El Zero Miedo and Best Friends (Chuck Taylor and Trent Beretta) and Orange Cassidy in a Stadium Stampede match, but they lost. At All Out on September 3, Danielson made his return from injury as a face and defeated Ricky Starks in a No Disqualification Strap match, Castagnoli and Yuta defeated Kingston and Katsuyori Shibata in a tag team match, while at the main event, Moxley was able to win the AEW International Championship from Cassidy. At Grand Slam on September 20, Castagnoli lost the ROH World Championship to Kingston in a Winner Takes All match that also put the Strong Openweight Championship on the line. After the match, Claudio finally shook Eddie's hand after years of animosity between the two, showing a sign of respect and a face turn, while Moxley lost the AEW International Championship to Rey Fénix. On September 30 edition of AEW Collision, the Blackpool Combat Club turned face when they teamed with FTR and were defeated by Big Bill and Ricky Starks and Aussie Open in an All-Star 8-men tag team match. On November 25 edition of AEW Rampage, Yuta defeated Shibata to win the record 3-times ROH Pure Championship.

On April 12, 2024, at Windy City Riot, Moxley defeated Tetsuya Naito to win the IWGP World Heavyweight Championship, becoming the first wrestler to become a world champion in WWE, AEW, and NJPW, in what NJPW promotes as the "Global Grand Slam Champion". On April 27 episode of AEW Collision, Castagnoli unsuccessfully challenged Swerve Strickland for the AEW World Championship. Moxley successfully defended his championship against Powerhouse Hobbs, Ren Narita, and Shota Umino, before being challenged by both Konosuke Takeshita to an Eliminator match at Double or Nothing on May 26, and Evil for Dominion 6.9 in Osaka-jo Hall. Danielson, meanwhile, joined Team AEW against The Elite for the Anarchy in the Arena match at Double or Nothing. At the event, Moxley pinned Takeshita to win the Eliminator match; however, The Elite defeated Team AEW when Danielson was pinned by Jack Perry.

Yuta, who'd been sidelined with an injury since February, returned to action in AEW on June 5 edition of AEW Dynamite. On June 9 at Dominion, Moxley defeated Evil to retain the IWGP World Heavyweight Championship before being challenged by Tetsuya Naito for a rematch at Forbidden Door. Moxley would lose the championship back to Naito on June 30 at Forbidden Door, subsequently going on hiatus following this loss. That same night, Danielson began his participation in the Owen Hart Foundation Tournament with a first round victory over Shingo Takagi. Danielson defeated Pac at Dynamite: Beach Break on July 3, then "Hangman" Adam Page on July 10, to win the tournament and earn a match against Swerve Strickland for the AEW World Championship at All In. Also on July 10, Castagnoli competed in a Global Glory Four-Way match to earn an AEW International Championship match at All Out, however Pac won the match. On July 31, Danielson addressed speculation on his intentions to wind down his career, declaring that if he failed to win the AEW World Championship from Strickland at All In, he would never wrestle again. On August 21 episode of Dynamite, Castagnoli challenged Kazuchika Okada for the AEW Continental Championship; the match ended in a 20-minute time limit draw.

On August 25 at All In, Yuta and Castagnoli teamed with Pac in the Four-way London Ladder match for the AEW World Trios Championship, which they won. Later that same night, Danielson defeated Strickland to win the AEW World Championship for the first time. On the following episode of Dynamite on August 28, Danielson announced that as long as he was AEW World Champion, he would remain a full-time AEW wrestler, and that his full-time career would end as soon as he lost the championship.

=== Death Riders (2024–present) ===
==== Rebrand and Moxley's fourth world title reign (2024–2025) ====
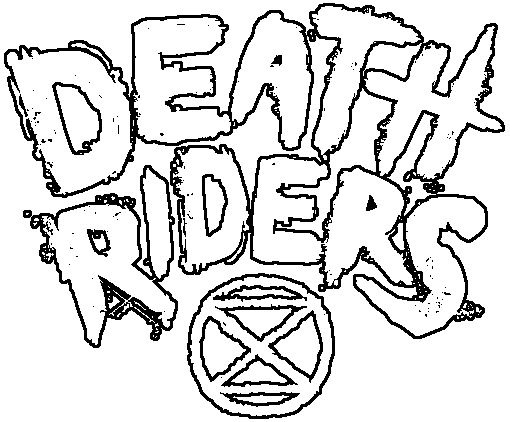
Original logo of the Death Riders

While Danielson and the BCC resumed feuding with The Elite, Moxley, who returned from hiatus on August 28 episode of Dynamite, initially did not appear with his BCC allies and instead began a feud with Darby Allin, while forming an alliance with Marina Shafir in the process.

On September 7 at All Out, after Danielson retained the title against Jack Perry, Castagnoli and Moxley attacked Danielson while feigning celebration and attempted suffocation with a plastic bag, turning into heels once again and kicking Danielson out of the group. After turning on Danielson, Moxley took over leadership of the BCC with Pac and Shafir as the newest additions.

On September 25 at Grand Slam, Moxley would defeat Darby Allin with Allin's guaranteed AEW World Championship match on the line. On October 12 at WrestleDream, Moxley defeated Danielson to win the AEW World Championship for the record-setting fourth time and ending Danielson's full-time career. On November 6 episode of Dynamite, the BCC officially rebranded to the Death Riders, a nod to Moxley's nickname in NJPW as well as the name of his finisher.

Moxley would successfully defend his title with assistance from the other members against the likes of Orange Cassidy at Full Gear on November 23, Cassidy, "Hangman" Adam Page, and Jay White in a four-way match at Worlds End on December 30, Powerhouse Hobbs at Dynamite: Maximum Carnage on January 15, 2025, Cope twice at Revolution on March 9 and on March 19 episode of Dynamite in a street fight, and Swerve Strickland at Dynasty on April 6.

On April 9 episode of Dynamite. Pac suffered a foot injury during his match with Swerve Strickland and would be out indefinitely. On April 16 at Dynamite: Spring BreakThru, Castagnoli and Yuta with Moxley filling in for an injured Pac lost the trios titles to Powerhouse Hobbs and The Opps (Samoa Joe and Katsuyori Shibata), ending their reign at 234 days. Moxley retained the world title against Samoa Joe in a Steel Cage match at Dynamite: Beach Break, with the assistance of Gabe Kidd. After Beach Break, Kidd was referred to as a "hired mercenary" for the Death Riders, teaming with and assisting the stable in matches without being recognized as an official member. On May 25 at Double or Nothing, the Death Riders teamed with The Young Bucks, losing to Kenny Omega, Swerve Strickland, Willow Nightingale, and The Opps (Samoa Joe, Powerhouse Hobbs, and Katsuyori Shibata) in an Anarchy in the Arena match. On July 12 at All In, Castagnoli and Yuta with Gabe Kidd failed to regain the trios titles from The Opps, while Moxley lost his title to Adam Page, ending his reign at 273 days. On July 30 edition of Dynamite, Moxley failed to regain the world title from Page in a rematch with the stipulation of everyone being banned from ringside.

==== Expansion and various feuds (2025–present) ====
At Forbidden Door on August 24, Moxley and Castagnoli teamed with Kidd and The Young Bucks in a Lights Out Steel Cage match against Will Ospreay, Allin, Hiroshi Tanahashi and Golden Lovers (Omega and Kota Ibushi) in a losing effort. After the match, the Death Riders attacked Ospreay. On September 10 episode of Dynamite, Daniel Garcia joined the Death Riders after attacking Darby Allin and siding with Moxley. At All Out on September 20, Garcia defeated Katsuyori Shibata and Moxley defeated Darby in a Coffin match after Pac made his return. At WrestleDream on October 18, Castagnoli, Yuta, Pac and Garcia defeated Roderick Strong and The Conglomeration (Orange Cassidy, Tomohiro Ishii and Kyle O'Reilly), while Moxley lost to Allin in an "I Quit" match. At Blood & Guts on November 12, Shafir participated and won in the women's Blood and Guts match, while Moxley, Castagnoli, Yuta, Garcia, and Pac lost the men's Blood and Guts match to Allin, Roderick Strong, and The Conglomeration (Orange Cassidy, O'Reilly, and Mark Briscoe), with Moxley tapping out. On November 24, Castagonli, Moxley, and Pac were announced as participants in the 2025 Continental Classic, where Castagnoli and Moxley were placed in the Blue League while Pac was placed in the Gold League. On November 28, Castagnoli defeated Gran Guerrero to win the CMLL World Heavyweight Championship for the first time in his career. In the Continental Classic, Moxley was the only member of the Death Riders to advance to the semi-final stage at Worlds End on December 27 after finishing second in his league with 9 points. At Worlds End, Moxley defeated Kyle Fletcher in the semi-finals and defending champion Kazuchika Okada in the finals at Worlds End to win the tournament and the AEW Continental Championship. In his post-match promo, Moxley praised the rest of the participants in the tournament and thanking the AEW fans for their support. becoming a tweener in the process.

On January 14, 2026, at Dynamite: Maximum Carnage, Pac was defeated by Allin, ending the stable's feud with Allin as Pac was the only member of the Death Riders (barring Shafir) that Allin had yet to defeat.At Revolution on March 15, Shafir was defeated by "Timeless" Toni Storm in her first pay-per-view singles match, while Moxley would successfully defend his title against Konosuke Takeshita and would be attacked by a returning Will Ospreay. On March 20 at Homenaje a Dos Leyendas, Castagnoli lost the CMLL World Heavyweight Championship to Hechicero. After Moxley successfully defended his title against Ospreay at Dynasty, the Death Riders formed an alliance with Ospreay after Moxley offered to train him, believing Ospreay had become mentally fragile following his injury and would continue to get hurt if he remained on his current path. In May to June during the Owen Hart Cup tournament, Castagnoli would be eliminated in the quarterfinal by Brody King and the stable would also assist Ospreay fend off the Don Callis Family during his semifinal match against Mark Davis. Ospreay would go on to win the tournament, defeating Swerve Strickland in the grand final at Forbidden Door on June 28. In the following months, Gabe Kidd and Will Ospreay would officially join the Death Rider. Kidd would also remained as a member of his original stable The Dogs and formed an alliance between the two stables. During the Road to G1 Climax tour on July 6, Kidd defeated Shota Umino to win the IWGP Global Heavyweight Championship. On July 26 at Redemption, Moxley and Ospreay were defeated by The Young Bucks, while Castagnoli and Pac failed to win the AEW World Tag Team Championship from Cage and Cope (Christian Cage and Adam Copeland). After the main event, Ospreay turned on the Death Riders after refusing to attack Kenny Omega and would officially leave the group on the following episode of Dynamite. In August 2026, Moxley entered and won the inaugural Continental Challenge Cup, defeating Nigel McGuinness in the grand final at All In on August 30 to win the tournament and retain his Continental Championship.

On September 27, AEW announced that Pac had died at the age of 40, just less than 24 hours after he unsuccessfully challenged Andrade El Idolo for the AEW National Championship at All Out. On September 30 at A Tribute to Pac event on the following Wednesday, Danielson teamed with the Death Riders for one night only to defeat The Don Callis Family. On the October 21 episode of Dynamite, the Death Riders all officially turned face after they and The Conglomeration were all attacked by The Dogs, who also turned on Kidd, and the Bang Bang Gang, who turned heel. The Death Riders and Conglomeration faced the Dogs and Bang Bang Gang – who had merged into a new faction, The Cut – at Full Gear on November 14 in an Anarchy in the Arena match, which they lost.

== Members ==
Death Riders
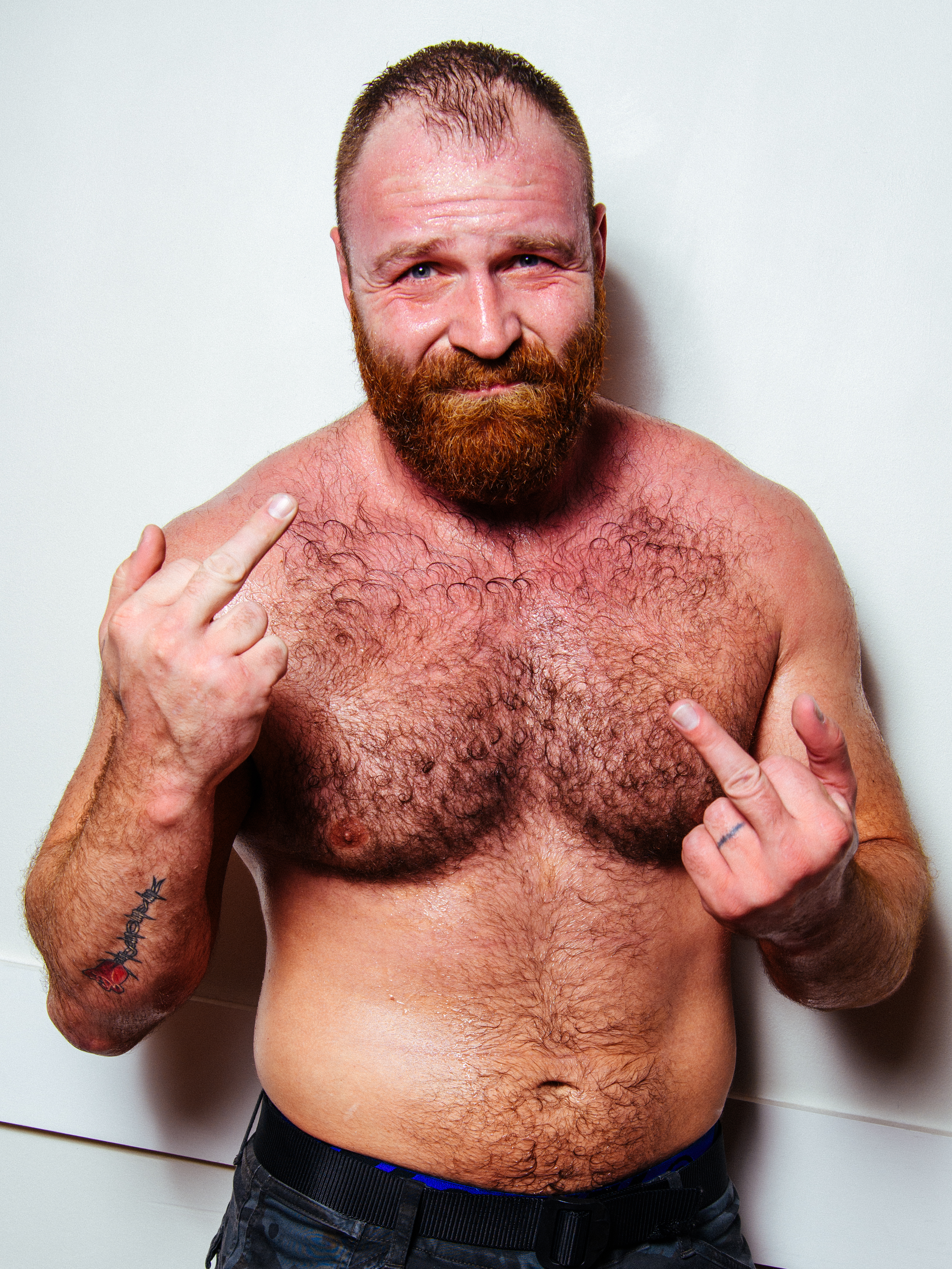
Jon Moxley (*/L)

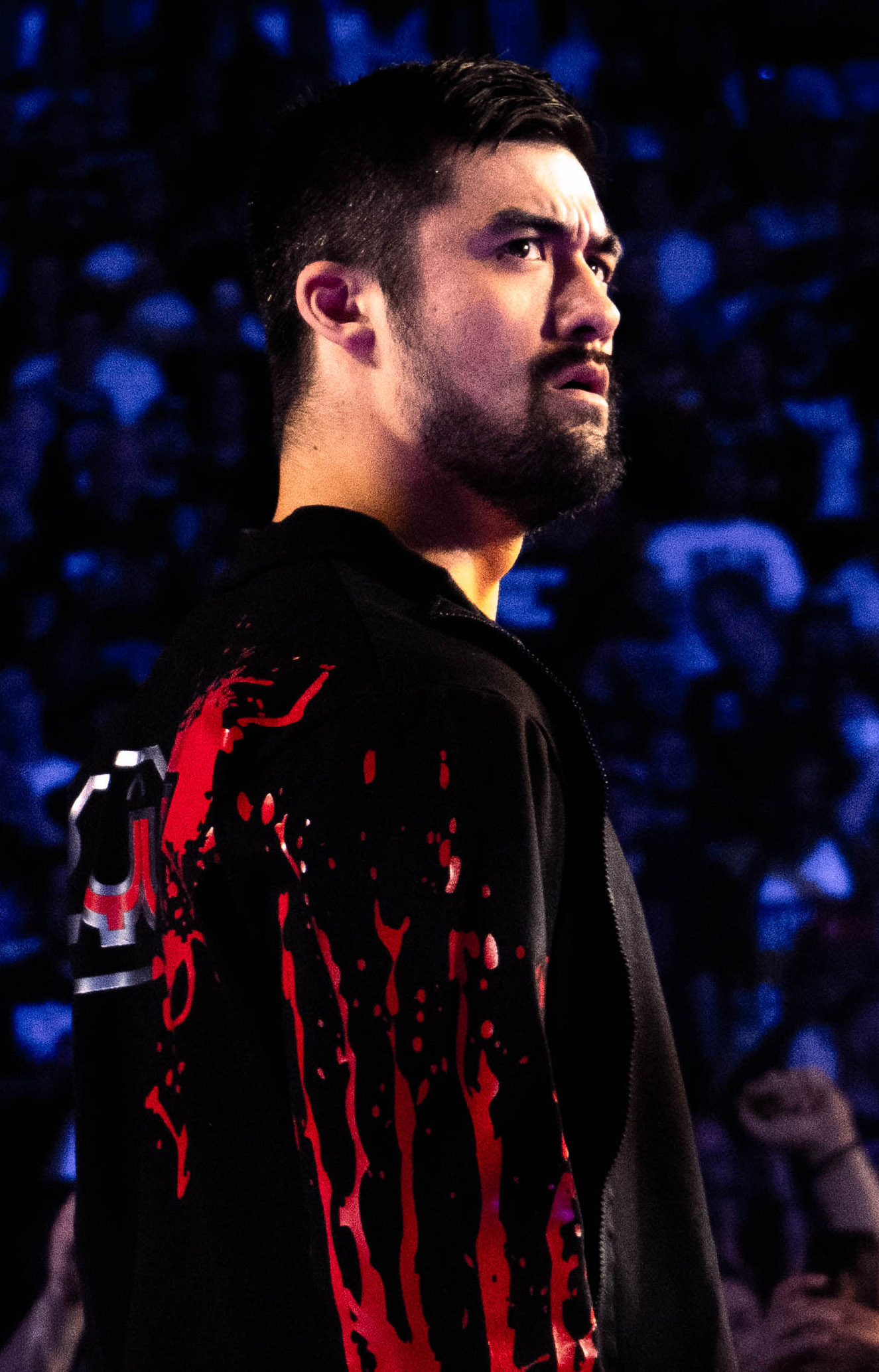
Wheeler Yuta

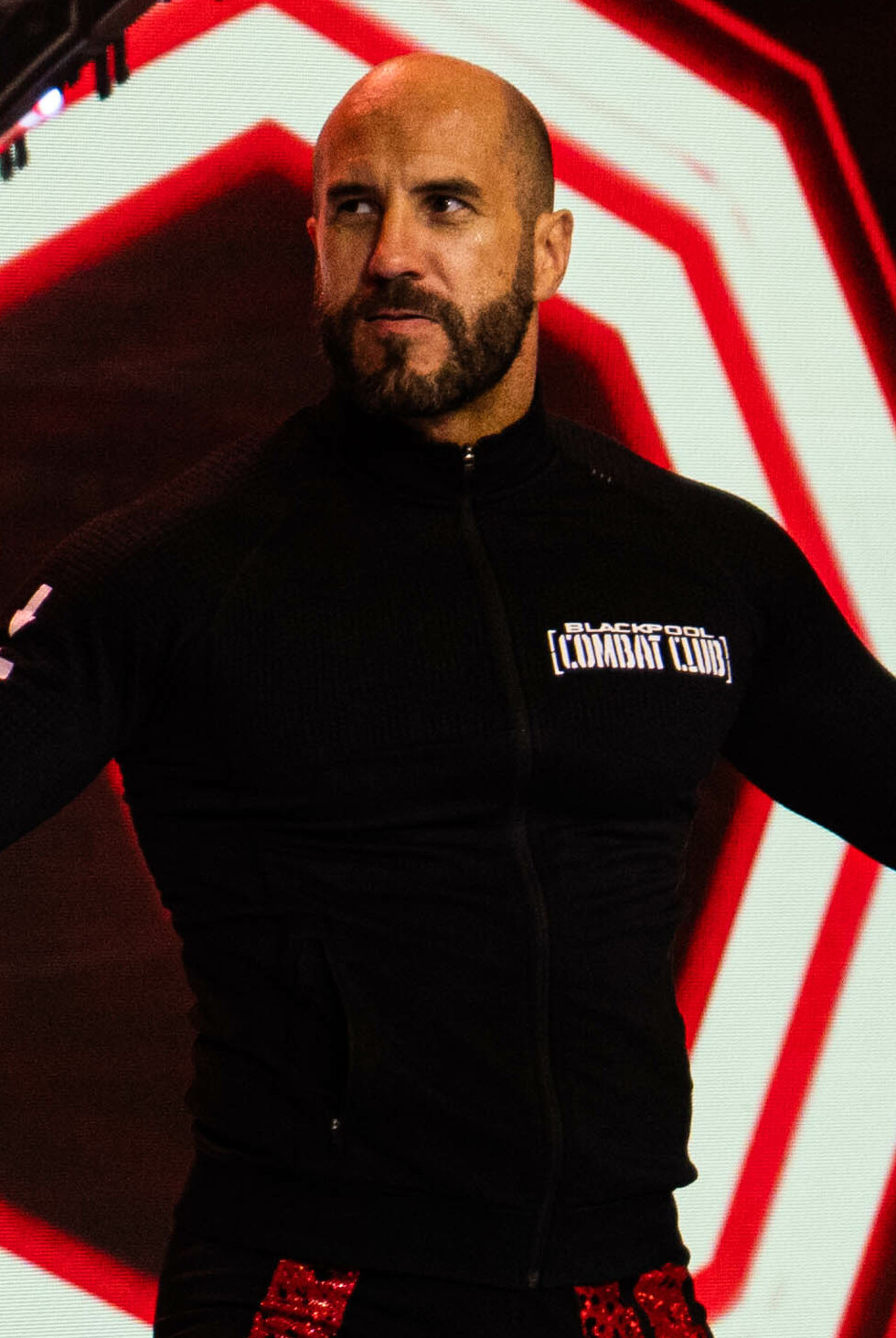
Claudio Castagnoli

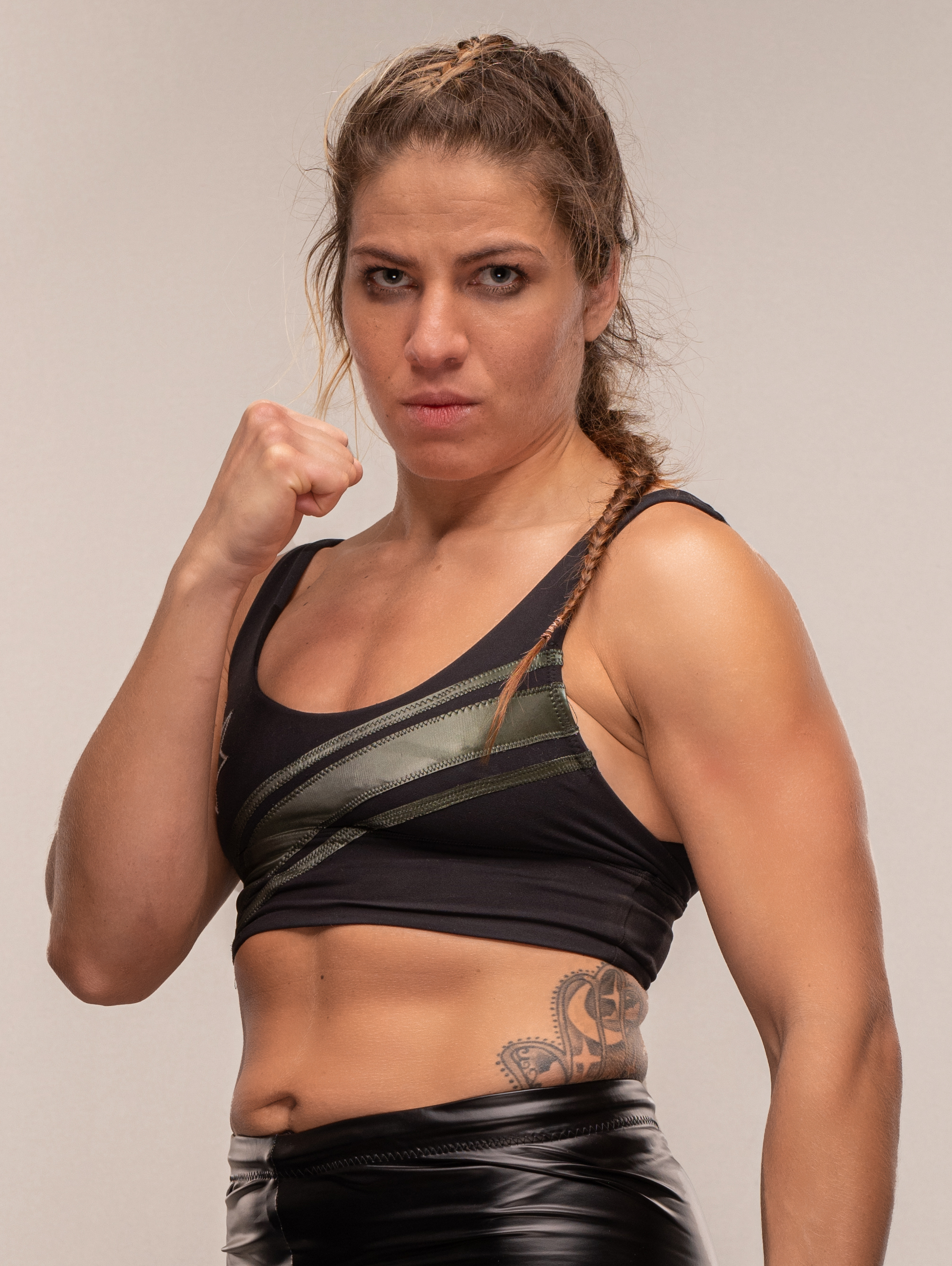
Marina Shafir

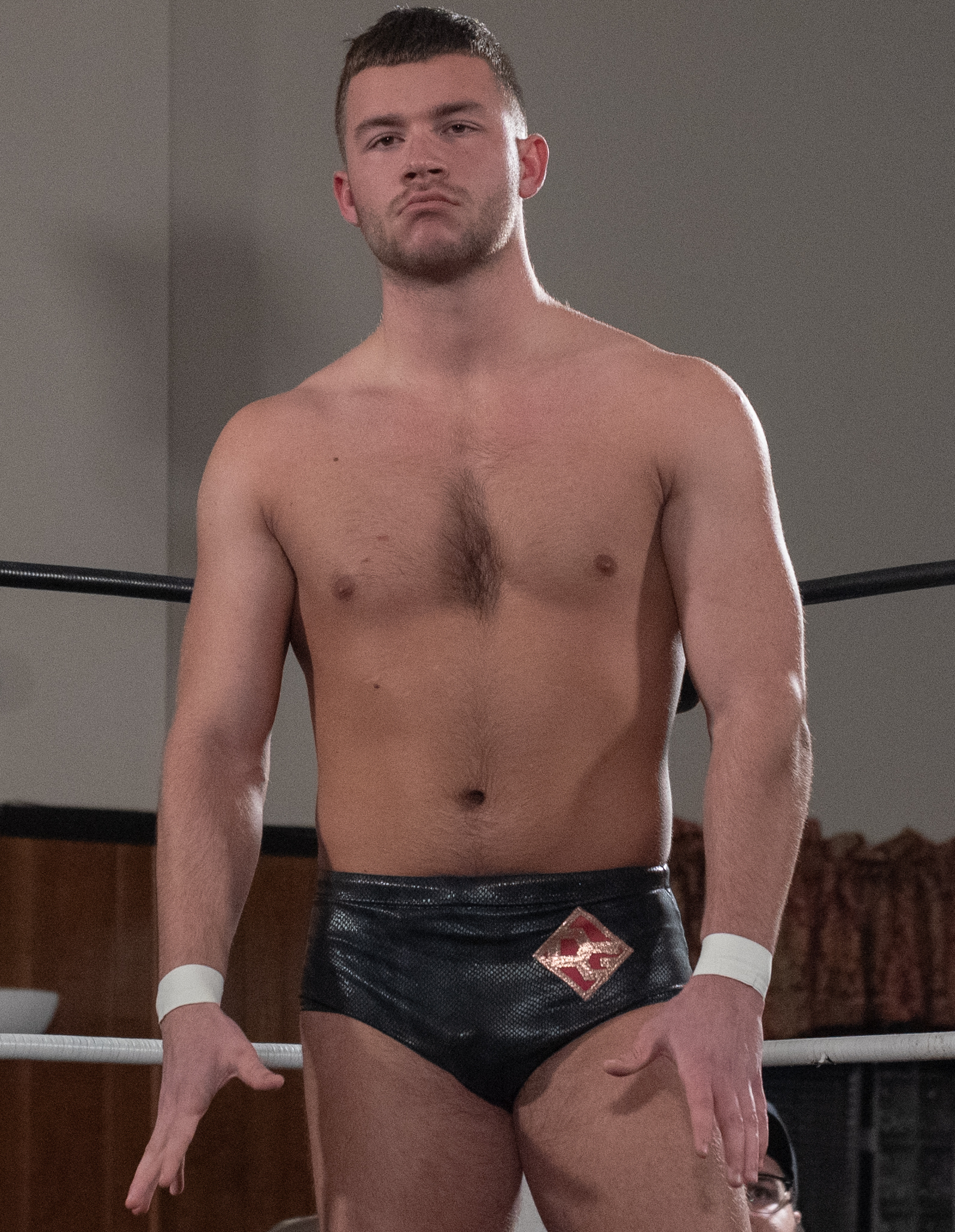
Daniel Garcia

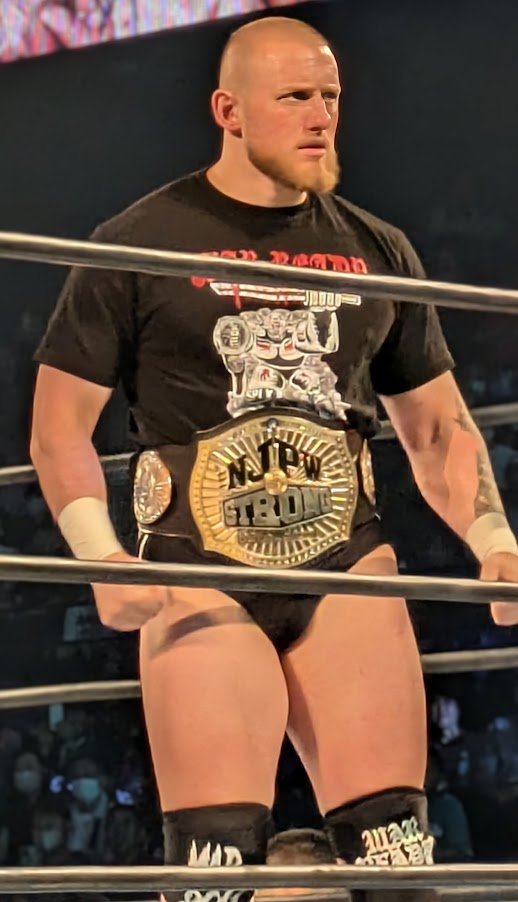
Gabe Kidd

*	Founding member
L	Leader
M	Manager
†	Member left faction as a result of their death

=== Current ===
Member		Joined
Jon Moxley	*L	March 6, 2022
Wheeler Yuta		April 8, 2022
Claudio Castagnoli		June 26, 2022
Marina Shafir		September 7, 2024
Daniel Garcia		September 10, 2025
Gabe Kidd		June 14, 2026

=== Former ===
Member		Joined	Left
William Regal	*M	March 6, 2022	December 6, 2022
Bryan Danielson	*	March 6, 2022	September 7, 2024
Will Ospreay		July 1, 2026	July 29, 2026
Pac		September 7, 2024	September 27, 2026 †

== Championships and accomplishments ==
- All Elite Wrestling
  - AEW World Championship (4 times) – Moxley (3), Danielson (1)
  - AEW Interim World Championship (1 time) – Moxley
  - AEW International Championship (1 time) – Moxley
  - AEW Continental Championship (1 time, current) – Moxley
  - AEW World Trios Championship (1 time) – Castagnoli, Yuta, and Pac
  - Men's Owen Hart Cup (1 time) – Danielson (2024)
  - Continental Classic (2025) – Moxley
  - Continental Challenge Cup (2026) – Moxley
  - The Butcher Battle Royale (2026) – Garcia
- Consejo Mundial de Lucha Libre
  - CMLL World Heavyweight Championship (1 time) – Castagnoli
  - International Gran Prix (2024) – Castagnoli
  - CMLL World Micro-Estrellas Championship (1 time, current) – KeMalito
- DEFY Wrestling
  - DEFY Women's Championship (1 time, current) – Shafir
- Game Changer Wrestling
  - GCW World Championship (1 time) – Moxley
- New Japan Pro-Wrestling
  - IWGP Global Heavyweight Championship (1 time, current) – Kidd
  - IWGP Heavyweight Championship (1 time) (Note: During Moxley's reign, the title was called the IWGP World Heavyweight Championship.) – Moxley
  - IWGP Intercontinental Championship (1 time) (Note: With the reactivation of the IWGP Heavyweight Championship and the restored and combined histories of both it, the World Heavyweight, and the Intercontinental titles, all former IWGP World Heavyweight Champions are retroactively recognized as having been an IWGP Intercontinental Champion.) – Moxley
- Pro-Wrestling: EVE
  - Pro-Wrestling: EVE International Championship (1 time, current) – Shafir
- Pro Wrestling Illustrated
  - Inspirational Wrestler of the Year (2022) – Moxley
  - Most Popular Wrestler of the Year (2022) – Moxley
- Ring of Honor
  - ROH World Championship (2 times) – Castagnoli
  - ROH Pure Championship (3 times) – Yuta
- Wrestling Observer Newsletter
  - Best Brawler (2022, 2023, 2025) – Moxley
  - Best Technical Wrestler (2022, 2023) – Danielson
  - United States/Canada MVP (2022, 2025) – Moxley
  - Wrestler of the Year (2022) – Moxley
