= Progress Chapter 172: Werewolves Of London =

2024 Progress Wrestling event

Chapter 172: Werewolves Of London
- Promotional poster of the event
- Promotion: Progress Wrestling
- Date: 27 October 2024
- City: London, England
- Venue: Electric Ballroom

Event chronology
| ← Previous; Progress x Noah x DEFY | Next → Chapter 173: Stay Young & Invincible |

The Chapter 172: Werewolves Of London was a professional wrestling event produced by Progress Wrestling. It took place on October 27, 2024, in London, England at Electric Ballroom.

Eight matches were contested at the event. The main event saw Rhio defeat Lizzy Evo by referee stoppage to retain the Progress World Women's Championship.

== Production ==
=== Storylines ===
The event included matches that each resulted from scripted storylines, where wrestlers portrayed heroes, villains, or less distinguishable characters in scripted events that built tension and culminated in a wrestling match or series of matches. Results were predetermined by Progress' creative writers, while storylines were produced on Progress' events airing on the Demand PROGRESS streaming service.

=== Event ===
The event started with the confrontation between Cara Noir and Kenta, disputed for the latter's DEFY World Championship of which he emerged victorious by retaining the title. Next up, Gene Munny and Will Kroos picked up a victory over Chuck Mambo and TK Cooper in tag team competition. The third bout saw Charlie Sterling and Nick Riley successfully defending the PROGRESS Tag Team Championship for the first time in that respective reign in an intergender tag team match against LA Taylor and Skye Smitson. In the fourth bout, Luke Jacobs defeated Man Like DeReiss to secure the fifth consecutive defense of the PROGRESS World Championship in that respective reign. Jacobs picked up the win with help from a returning Ethan Allen. Next up, Ricky Knight Jr. defeated Mike D Vecchio, Connor Mills and Zozaya in a four-way bout. Next up, Simon Miller defeated Paul Robinson to end the latter's 1,869-day nine-defence reign of the Progress Proteus Championship. The semi main event saw Flash Morgan Webster and Mark Andrews picking up a victory over Eddie Dennis and Tate Mayfairs in tag team competition.

In the main event, Rhio defeated Lizzy Evo to secure the seventeenth consecutive defense of the Progress World Women's Championship in that respective reign.

== Results ==
| No. | Results | Stipulations | Times |
|---|---|---|---|
| 1 | Kenta (c) defeated Cara Noir by pinfall | Singles match for the DEFY World Championship | 13:21 |
| 2 | Gene Munny and Will Kroos (Note: Kroos replaced Session Moth Martina who was initially scheduled to compete in the match.) defeated Sunshine Machine (Chuck Mambo and TK Cooper) by pinfall | Tag team match | 10:38 |
| 3 | Smokin' Aces (Charlie Sterling and Nick Riley) (c) defeated The Experience (LA Taylor and Skye Smitson) by pinfall | Tag team match for the PROGRESS Tag Team Championship | 8:10 |
| 4 | Luke Jacobs (c) defeated Man Like DeReiss by pinfall | Singles match for the PROGRESS World Championship | 17:42 |
| 5 | Ricky Knight Jr. defeated Mike D Vecchio, Connor Mills and Zozaya by pinfall | Four-way match | 7:51 |
| 6 | Simon Miller defeated Paul Robinson (c) by technical knockout | Singles match for the Progress Proteus Championship | 10:53 |
| 7 | Subculture (Flash Morgan Webster and Mark Andrews) defeated Eddie Dennis and Tate Mayfairs by pinfall | Tag team match | 12:29 |
| 8 | Rhio (c) defeated Lizzy Evo by referee stoppage | Singles match for the Progress World Women's Championship | 22:52 |
(c) / – the champion(s) heading into the match
