= Progress Chapter Three: Fifty Shades Of Pain =

2012 professional wrestling event by Progress Wrestling

Progress Chapter Three: Fifty Shades of Pain
- Promotional poster of the event
- Promotion: Progress Wrestling
- Date: September 30, 2012
- City: London, England
- Venue: The Garage
- Attendance: approx. 350

Event chronology
← Previous; Chapter Two: The March of Progress	Next → Chapter Four: The Ballad of El Ligero

Progress Chapter Three: Fifty Shades of Pain was a professional wrestling event promoted by Progress Wrestling. It took place on September 30, 2012, in London, England at The Garage.

== Production ==
=== Storylines ===
The event featured matches that were the result of scripted storylines, where wrestlers portrayed heroes, villains, or characters with ambiguous traits. These storylines built tension and culminated in wrestling matches or a series of matches. The outcomes of the matches were predetermined by Progress Wrestling's creative team, while the storylines were produced for Progress Wrestling's events, which were made available as VOD events on the Pivotshare service.

=== Event ===
The event began with a singles match between Paul Robinson and Noam Dar, which ended with Dar securing the victory. Following that, Mark Andrews successfully defended the BWC Scarlo Scholarship Championship by defeating Xander Cooper. The third match featured a tag team bout, where James Davis and Rob Lynch triumphed over Danny Garnell and Darrell Allen. In the fourth match, Jimmy Havoc faced Jon Ryan in a singles contest. The match initially ended in disqualification, awarding the victory to Havoc. However, the match was restarted under Hardcore rules, and this time, Ryan emerged victorious. Next, RJ Singh defeated Rob Cage in a singles competition. In the semi-main event, Stixx overcame The Lion Kid. The main event saw Dave Mastiff and Greg Burridge defeating El Ligero and Nathan Cruz in a special tag team match with Marty Scurll serving as the guest referee.

== Results ==
No.	Results	Stipulations	Times
1	Noam Dar defeated Paul Robinson	Singles match	11:42
2	Mark Andrews (c) defeated Xander Cooper	Singles match for the BWC Scarlo Scholarship Championship	8:52
3	The London Riots (James Davis and Rob Lynch) defeated The Bastard Squad (Danny Garnell and Darrell Allen)	Tag team match	12:25
4	Jimmy Havoc defeated Jon Ryan by disqualification	Singles match	3:35
5	Jon Ryan defeated Jimmy Havoc	Hardcore match	14:36
6	RJ Singh defeated Rob Cage	Singles match	7:27
7	Stixx defeated The Lion Kid	Singles match	12:20
8	Dave Mastiff and Greg Burridge defeated El Ligero and Nathan Cruz	Tag team match The special guest referee for the match was Marty Scurll.	18:10
(c) / – the champion(s) heading into the match
