= Progress Chapter 173: Stay Young & Invincible =

2024 Progress Wrestling event

Chapter 173: Stay Young & Invincible
- Promotional poster of the event
- Promotion: Progress Wrestling
- Date: 17 November 2024
- City: Manchester, England
- Venue: O2 Ritz

Event chronology
← Previous; Chapter 172: Werewolves Of London	Next → Chapter 174: Vendetta 2

The Chapter 173: Stay Young & Invincible was a professional wrestling event produced by Progress Wrestling. It took place on 17 November 2024, in Manchester, England at O2 Ritz.

Seven matches were contested at the event. The main event saw Boisterous Behaviour (Leon Slater and Man Like DeReiss) defeat Young Guns (Ethan Allen and Luke Jacobs).

== Production ==
=== Storylines ===
The event included matches that each resulted from scripted storylines, where wrestlers portrayed heroes, villains, or less distinguishable characters in scripted events that built tension and culminated in a wrestling match or series of matches. Results were predetermined by Progress' creative writers, while storylines were produced on Progress' events airing on the Demand PROGRESS streaming service.

=== Event ===
The event started with the tag team confrontation between Flash Morgan Webster and Mark Andrews, and Smokin' Aces (Charlie Sterling and Nick Riley), solded with the victory of the latter team who secured the second consecutive defense of the PROGRESS Tag Team Championship in that respective reign. Next up, Myles Kayman picked up a victory over Connor Mills in singles competition. The third bout saw Gene Munny and Session Moth Martina outmatch Skye Smitson and Sam Bailey who replaced LA Taylor in the match due to the latter getting injured by Munny and Martina prior to the event. Next up, Cara Noir defeated Charli Evans in an intergender bout. Next up, Kid Lykos and Kid Lykos II defeated Kieron Lacey and Mark Trew in tag team action. In the semi main event, Emersyn Jayne defeated Natalie Sykes in singles competition.

In the main event, Leon Slater and Man Like DeReiss defeated PROGRESS World Champion Luke Jacobs and Ethan Allen in tag team competition.

== Results ==
No.	Results	Stipulations	Times
1	Smokin' Aces (Charlie Sterling and Nick Riley) (c) defeated Subculture (Flash Morgan Webster and Mark Andrews) by pinfall	Tag team match for the PROGRESS Tag Team Championship	11:45
2	Myles Kayman defeated Connor Mills by pinfall	Singles match	8:47
3	Mothdog (Gene Munny and Session Moth Martina) (with Will Kroos) defeated Sam Bailey and Skye Smitson by pinfall (Note: Bailey replaced LA Taylor in the match.)	Tag team match	9:29
4	Cara Noir defeated Charli Evans by pinfall	Singles match	15:20
5	Lykos Gym (Kid Lykos and Kid Lykos II) defeated Kieron Lacey and Mark Trew by pinfall	Tag team match	9:02
6	Emersyn Jayne defeated Natalie Sykes by pinfall	Singles match	4:04
7	Boisterous Behaviour (Leon Slater and Man Like DeReiss) defeated Young Guns (Ethan Allen and Luke Jacobs) by pinfall	Tag team match	27:40
(c) / – the champion(s) heading into the match
