= Progress Chapter 167: One Bump Or Two? =

2024 Progress Wrestling event

- Promotional poster of the event
- Promotion: Progress Wrestling
- Date: April 21, 2024
- City: London, England
- Venue: The Garage
- Attendance: ~350

Event chronology
← Previous; Chapter 166: Freedom Walks Again	Next → Super Strong Style 16

The Progress Chapter 167: One Bump Or Two? was a professional wrestling event promoted by Progress Wrestling. It took place on April 21, 2024, in London, England at The Garage.

== Production ==
=== Storylines ===
The event included matches that each resulted from scripted storylines, where wrestlers portrayed heroes, villains, or less distinguishable characters in scripted events that built tension and culminated in a wrestling match or series of matches. Results were predetermined by Progress' creative writers, while storylines were produced on Progress' events airing on the Demand PROGRESS streaming service.

=== Event ===
The event started with the singles confrontation between Gene Munny and Mark Haskins solded with the victory of the latter. In the second bout, Alexxis Falcon and Charles Crowley picked up a win over Reece and Rogan in tag team competition. Next up, Pro Wrestling Noah rookie in excursion Taishi Ozawa fell short to Luke Jacobs. The fourth bout saw Paul Robinson successfully defending the Progress Proteus Championship for the eighth consecutive time against Homicide in that respective reign, making it clear that he did not deactivate it in early 2020. Next up, Chuck Mambo and TK Cooper outmatched LA Taylor and Skye Smitson in tag team competition. In the semi main event, Yoichi defeated Westside Xtreme Wrestling's wXw Unified World Wrestling Champion Robert Dreissker to secure the first and only defense of the Progress Wrestling Atlas Championship in that respective reign.

In the main event, Big Damo and Axel Tischer defeated PROGRESS World Champion Kid Lykos and Kid Lykos II to secure the first defense of the PROGRESS Tag Team Championship in that respective reign.

== Results ==
No.	Results	Stipulations	Times
1	Mark Haskins (with Vicky Haskins) defeated Gene Munny by pinfall	Singles match	12:02
2	Cheeky Little Buggers (Alexxis Falcon and Charles Crowley) defeated Reece and Rogan by pinfall	Tag team match	8:20
3	Luke Jacobs defeated Taishi Ozawa by pinfall	Singles match	8:04
4	Paul Robinson (c) defeated Homicide by pinfall	Singles match for the Progress Proteus Championship	13:58
5	Sunshine Machine (Chuck Mambo and TK Cooper) defeated Lana Austin Experience (LA Taylor and Skye Smitson) by pinfall	Tag team match	14:52
6	Yoichi (c) defeated Robert Dreissker by pinfall	Singles match for the Progress Wrestling Atlas Championship	9:56
7	Sanity (Big Damo and Axel Tischer) (c) defeated Lykos Gym (Kid Lykos and Kid Lykos II) by pinfall	Tag team match for the PROGRESS Tag Team Championship	20:05
(c) / – the champion(s) heading into the match
