= Paul Robinson (wrestler) =

English professional wrestler

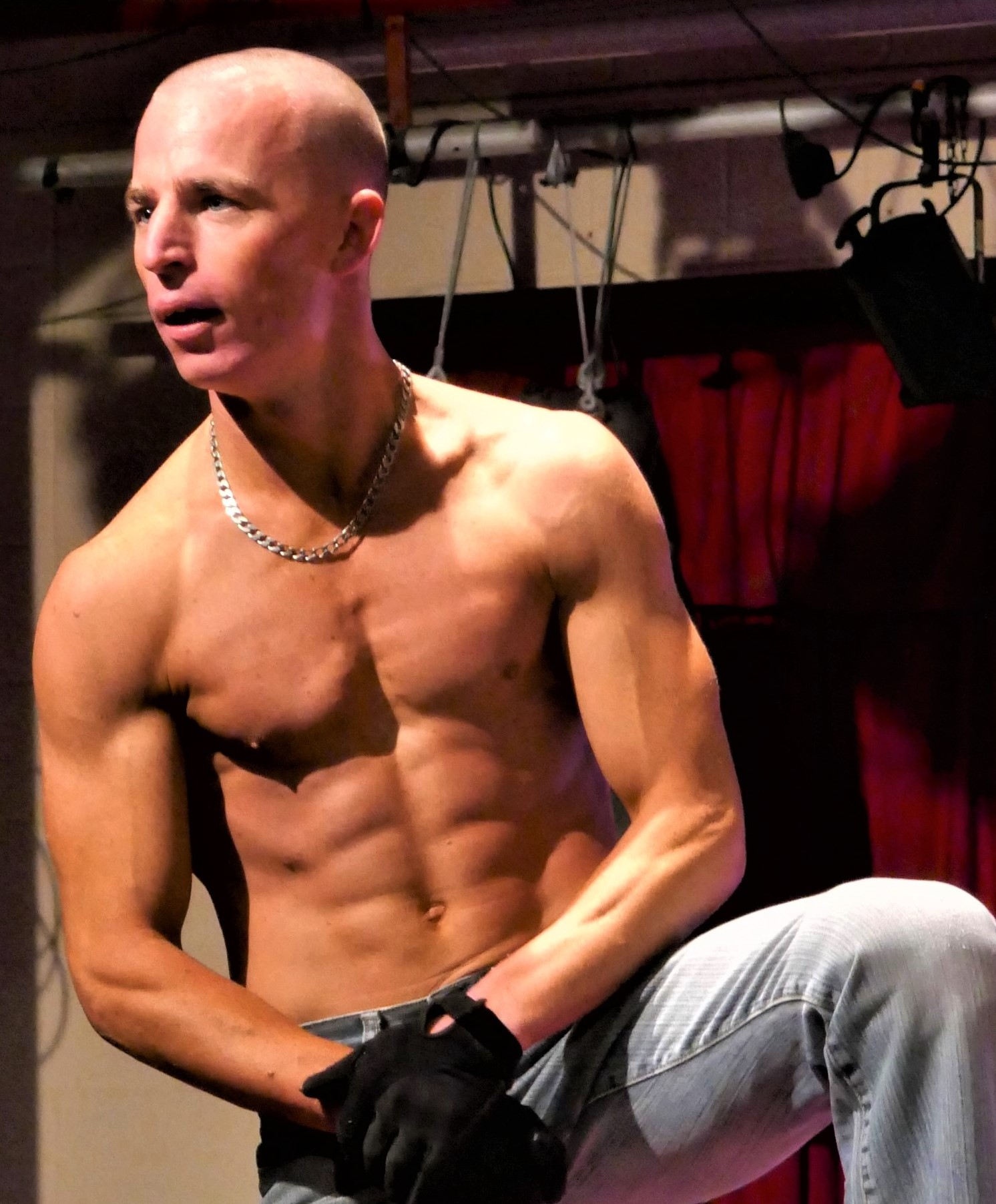
- Robinson in January 2019

Personal information
- Born: July 12, 1988 (age 38) England

Professional wrestling career
- Ring name: Question Leon Britannico Paul Robinson
- Billed height: 167 cm (5 ft 6 in)
- Billed weight: 64 kg (141 lb)
- Trained by: Jon Ritchie
- Debut: 2004

Paul Robinson (born July 12, 1988) is an English professional wrestler. He currently works on the British independent scene. He is best known for his tenure with Progress Wrestling, where he is a former Progress Proteus Champion and Progress Tag Team Champion.

== Professional wrestling career ==
=== Independent circuit (2004–2020) ===
Robinson was trained by Jon Ritchie and made his professional wrestling debut at a house show of Elite Wrestling Federation, later known as Grade 1 Wrestling (G1W) on April 17, 2004, where he defeated Ashley Reed and Tony Sefton in a three-way match. Throughout his career, Robinson competed in various promotions from the British independent scene such as Insane Championship Wrestling (ICW), TNT Extreme Wrestling (TNT), Lucha Britannia and many others.

=== International Pro Wrestling: United Kingdom (2005–2016) ===
Robinson shared a one decade-long tenure with International Pro Wrestling: United Kingdom (IPW:UK). He is a former IPW:UK World Champion, title which he won at Title Showdown 2013: Evening Show on December 7 by defeating Sha Samuels. He also won the IPW:UK Tag Team Championship on one occasion by teamin up with Scott Wainwright as The Swords of Essex at IPW:UK Biggest Show Ever on August 21, 2016.

=== Revolution Pro Wrestling (2012–2014; 2019) ===
Robinson made his debut in Revolution Pro Wrestling (RevPro) at the inaugural edition of the RevPro Uprising of 2012, where he defeated Ashley Reed in an intergender match. At RevPro Road To Thunder on May 26, 2013, he teamed up with Will Ospreay and defeated The London Riots (James Davis and Rob Lynch) to become the number one contenders for the British Tag Team Championship. They won the titles three weeks later at RevPro When Thunder Strikes on June 15, 2023, by defeating Project Ego (Kris Travis and Martin Kirby). Robinson and Ospreay dropped the titles at the 2014 edition of the RevPro High Stakes to The Inner City Machine Guns (Rich Swann and Ricochet).

Robinson made a one-time return at RevPro Live In Southampton 7 on April 14, 2019, where he fell short to Pac in singles competition.

=== Progress Wrestling (2012–2021) ===
Robinson made his debut in Progress Wrestling at Chapter Three: Fifty Shades Of Pain on September 30, 2012, where he fell short to Noam Dar.

During his time with the promotion, he has chased for various titles and accomplishments. At Chapter 82: Unboxing Live, A Dukla Prague Away Kit on December 30, 2018, he teamed up with his The Swords of Essex tag team partner Will Ospreay and defeated Aussie Open (Kyle Fletcher and Mark Davis) for the Progress Tag Team Championship. At Chapter 101: Dalmatians on January 19, 2020, he fought for the vacant PROGRESS World Championship in a four-way match won by Cara Noir and also involving Ilja Dragunov and Kyle Fletcher.

Robinson competed in various signature events of the promotion. In the Natural Progression Series, he made his first appearance in the inaugural edition of 2013, where he defeated MK McKinnan in the first rounds, Eddie Dennis in the second ones, but fell short to Mark Andrews in the finals which took place at Chapter Ten: Glory Follows Virtue As If It Were Its Shadow. In the Super Strong Style 16 series of events, Robinson made his first appearance at the 2019 edition where he defeated Darby Allin in the first rounds but fell short to Kyle O'Reilly in the quarterfinals.

At Chapter 95: Still Chasing on September 15, 2019, Robinson won a 30-man Royal Rumble match by last eliminating Danny Duggan to become the inaugural Progress Proteus Champion. The bout also involved notable opponents both male and female such as Millie McKenzie, Jonathan Gresham, Michael Oku, Eddie Kingston and others. Robinson successfully defended the title seven times in a row until Chapter 103: Beer Snake City on February 23, 2020. In February 2021, Progress announced that Robinson had left the promotion amid controversy stemming from sexual misconduct allegations made against him during the Speaking Out movement in June 2020.

=== Return to independent circuit (2022–present) ===
In 2022, Robinson made his return to wrestling after a two-year hiatus, appearing for Rainham Championship Wrestling Alliance (RCWA), losing to Will Ospreay. In March 2026, it was announced that Robinson had been working as a producer for the independent women’s wrestling promotion Pro-Wrestling: EVE. The revelation drew backlash due to past Speaking Out allegations against Robinson. Dann Read, the owner of the promotion, released a statement defending Robinson, saying: “I would never knowingly bring anyone into EVE if there was evidence they were a danger.”.

=== Return to Progress Wrestling (2023–2024) ===
After a three-year hiatus with the company, Robinson returned at Progress Chapter 167: One Bump Or Two? on April 21, 2024, where he successfully defended the Progress Proteus Championship against Homicide. During his absence, the Proteus title was replaced by the Atlas Championship, however, upon his return, Robinson declared the Proteus reign as uninterrupted. At Chapter 169: The Devil On My Shoulder on July 28, 2024, he defended the title against Malik. Robinson dropped the title at Chapter 172: Werewolves Of London on October 17, 2024, to Simon Miller. His reign later for 1,869 days, making him one of the longest-reigning champions in professional wrestling of the 21st-century.

== Sexual misconduct allegations ==
In June 2020, during the Speaking Out movement, Robinson was accused of grooming and predatory behavior involving an inebriated 16-year-old at a sports bar during a tour in Germany with IPW: UK in December 2014. Robinson denied the allegations in a public statement, claiming he never supplied alcohol, groomed, or took advantage of her, and said he instead informed her parents and spoke out against what he described as a harmful culture within IPW: UK, actions he said eventually led to him leaving the promotion for a period of time. Robinson later departed Progress Wrestling in 2021 amid controversy from the allegations before returning to the promotion in 2023.

== Championships and accomplishments ==
- Apollo Championship Wrestling
  - ACW Championship (1 time, inaugural)
  - ACW Title Tournament (2017)
- Banger Zone Wrestling
  - BZW Tag Team Championship (1 time) – with Jack Sans-Nom
- Championship Xtreme Wrestling
  - CXW Heavyweight Championship (1 time)
- Future Pro Wrestling
  - FPW Tag Team Championship (1 time) – with Will Ospreay
  - FPW Tag Team Title Tournament (2014) – with Will Ospreay
- International Pro Wrestling: United Kingdom
  - IPW:UK World Championship (1 time)
  - IPW:UK Tag Team Championship (1 time) – with Will Ospreay, Amazon and Scott Wainwright
- Lucha Britannia
  - Lucha Britannia World Championship (2 times, inaugural)
- Pro Wrestling Chaos
  - Knights Of Chaos Championship (2 times) – with Beano
- Pro Wrestling Illustrated
  - Ranked No. 310 of the top 500 singles wrestlers in the PWI 500 in 2020
- Progress Wrestling
  - Progress Proteus Championship (1 time, inaugural)
  - Progress Tag Team Championship (1 time) – with Will Ospreay
- Reloaded Championship Wrestling Alliance
  - RCWA British Heavyweight Championship (1 time)
  - RCWA Elite-1 Championship (1 time)
  - RCWA British Tag Team Championship (1 time) – with Scott Wainwright
- Revolution Pro Wrestling
  - British Tag Team Championship (1 time) – with Will Ospreay
- Frontline Wrestling
  - J-1 League (2019)
- TNT Extreme Wrestling
  - Thrill Kill (2023)
- other titles
  - British Triangle Championship (1 time) – with Scott Wainwright and Will Ospreay
