= Marina Shafir =

Moldovan professional wrestler and mixed martial artist

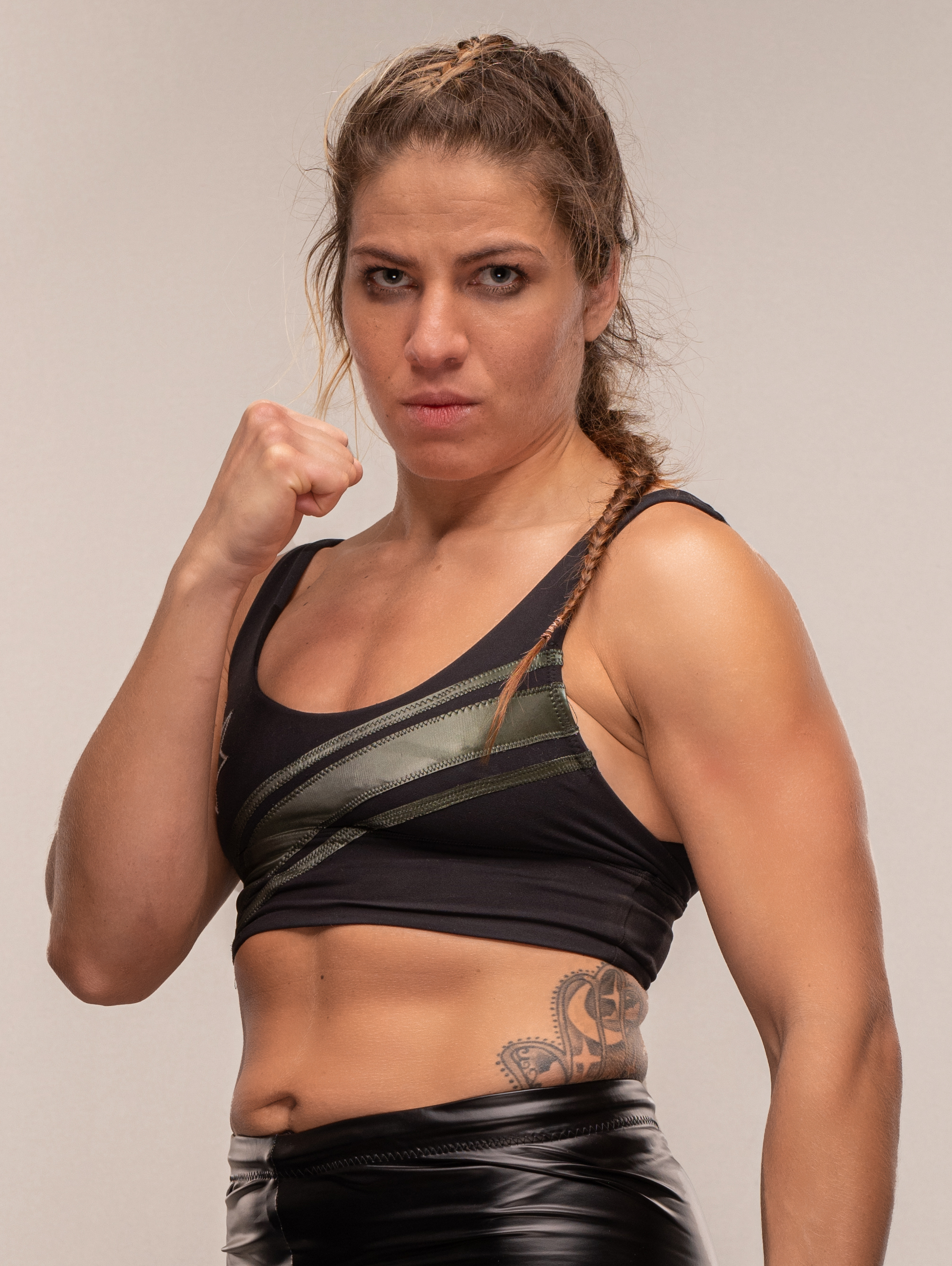
- Shafir in 2022
- Born: 14 April 1988 (age 38); Soroca, Moldavian SSR, Soviet Union (now Moldova)
- Spouse: Roderick Strong (m. 2018)
- Children: 1
- Professional wrestling career
- Ring name: Marina Shafir
- Billed height: 5 ft 7 in (1.70 m)
- Billed weight: 145 lb (66 kg; 10.4 st)
- Billed from: Moldova
- Trained by: WWE Performance Center; Sara Amato; Jon Moxley
- Debut: 25 August 2018
- Martial arts career
- Division: Featherweight (145 lb)
- Style: Judo
- Fighting out of: Venice, California
- Team: Glendale Fighting Club
- Years active: 2012–2016 (MMA)

Mixed martial arts record
- Total: 3
- Wins: 1
- By submission: 1
- Losses: 2
- By knockout: 2

Amateur record
- Total: 5
- Wins: 5
- By submission: 5

Other information
- Mixed martial arts record from Sherdog

Marina Shafir (Romanian: Marina Șafir; born 14 April 1988) is a Moldovan professional wrestler and former mixed martial artist. She is signed to All Elite Wrestling (AEW), where she is a member of the Death Riders stable. She also appears in AEW's sister promotion Ring of Honor (ROH). She also makes appearances on the independent circuit―predominantly for DEFY Wrestling, where she is the current DEFY Women's Champion in her first reign, and for Pro-Wrestling: EVE, where she is the Pro-Wrestling: EVE International Champion in her first reign.

Shafir formerly competed for MMA promotion Invicta Fighting Championships in the women's featherweight division. After retiring from MMA, she pursued a career in professional wrestling and signed with WWE, where she performed on their NXT brand. She was released from WWE in June 2021 and signed with AEW that December. She is the first and to date only Moldovan to ever compete for either promotion.

== Early life ==
Shafir moved from Moldova to the United States when she was five years old. Her father, a mechanic, and her mother, a teacher, settled in Latham, New York along with Marina and her two older brothers. Shafir began training judo when she was six years old and started competing at a high level in the sport when she was 12. However, she stopped competing in judo in her late teens. Shafir is a graduate of Shaker High School.

== Mixed martial arts career ==
Shafir began her mixed martial career at an amateur level in 2012. For two years, she was unbeaten, winning all five of her fights by submission (four by armbar and one by arm-triangle choke). She turned professional in early 2014.

Shafir's first professional fight was against Chandra Engel on 12 April 2014, where she won by submission in the first round. Later that year, Shafir suffered her first-ever loss in a first-round defeat to Amanda Bell. The following year, she signed with Invicta Fighting Championships. Her first match in the Invicta promotion was against Amber Leibrock on 9 July 2015, which was Leibrock's first professional fight. Shafir was defeated in the first round.

== Professional wrestling career ==
=== WWE (2018–2021) ===
On 7 May 2018, WWE announced that Shafir, along with Jessamyn Duke, had signed with WWE and reported to their Performance Center for training. On 28 October at WWE Evolution, Shafir and Duke made their WWE debuts as heels when they interfered during the NXT Women's Championship match, in which they helped Shayna Baszler regain the title over Kairi Sane. They made another appearance at NXT TakeOver: WarGames, when they interfered during Baszler and Sane's two out of three falls match, in which Baszler scored the first fall and the victory in the latter to retain the title. On the 19 December 2018 episode of NXT, Shafir and Duke made their NXT in ring debut, but were defeated by Io Shirai and Dakota Kai, when Shirai pinned Shafir after a moonsault. At NXT TakeOver: Phoenix, Shafir and Duke assisted Baszler in retaining the title against Bianca Belair. In October 2019, Duke and Shafir were defeated by Kai and Tegan Nox in a number one contender's match for the Women's Tag Team Championship. After several months of inactivity, Shafir returned to WWE TV on 17 August 2020, reuniting with Baszler and Duke, and winning a Raw Underground match. On 25 June 2021, Shafir was released from her WWE contract.

=== Independent circuit (2021–present) ===
On 22 October 2021, she debuted at Game Changer Wrestling's Josh Barnett's Bloodsport 7 where she defeated Masha Slamovich via submission. On the 13 November 2021 episode (taped 7 October 2021) of UWN Primetime Live Championship Wrestling from Georgia, she defeated Nightmare Factory alum, Brooke Havok. On 31 March 2022, she defeated Zeda Zhang via submission at Josh Barnett's Bloodsport 8. On 30 March 2023, Shafir defeated Killer Kelly via submission at Josh Barnett's Bloodsport 9. On 4 April 2024, she competed in a four-women tournament at Josh Barnett's Bloodsport X. She defeated Janai Kai in the semi-finals via submission and Lindsay Snow in the finals via referee stoppage. On 10 May 2024, at Defy Wrestling, she defeated Vert Vixen for the Defy Women's Championship at Here and Now. On 8 November 2026 at Pro-Wrestling: EVE's Elite Encounters II, Shafir defeated Miyu Yamashita to win the Pro-Wrestling: EVE International Championship.

=== All Elite Wrestling / Ring of Honor (2021–present) ===
==== Early appearances (2021–2023) ====
On the 14 December 2021 episode of AEW Dark, Shafir made her All Elite Wrestling debut, where she was defeated by Kris Statlander. After going on a six-match winning streak, on the 22 April 2022 episode of AEW Rampage, Shafir challenged Jade Cargill for the AEW TBS Championship in a losing effort. On 8 June on AEW Dynamite, Shafir faced Thunder Rosa for the AEW Women's World Championship which Shafir lost. On the 20 June 2022 episode of AEW Dark: Elevation, Shafir teamed with Nyla Rose. On the 9 August episode of AEW Dark, Vickie Guerrero, the manager of Rose, introduced Rose and Shafir as the Beasts of Burden. On the 10 January 2023 episode of Dark, Shafir challenged Athena for the ROH Women's World Championship, but was unsuccessful. On 26 January at The Jay Briscoe Celebration of Life, Shafir made her debut for AEW's sister promotion Ring of Honor (ROH), defeating Mighty Mayra in a squash match. On 17 November of Ring of Honor Wrestling, Shafir teamed with Ronda Rousey to defeat Athena and Billie Starkz. She would continue to spend the majority of 2023 wrestling on Dark, Dark: Elevation and ROH.

==== Death Riders (2024–present) ====
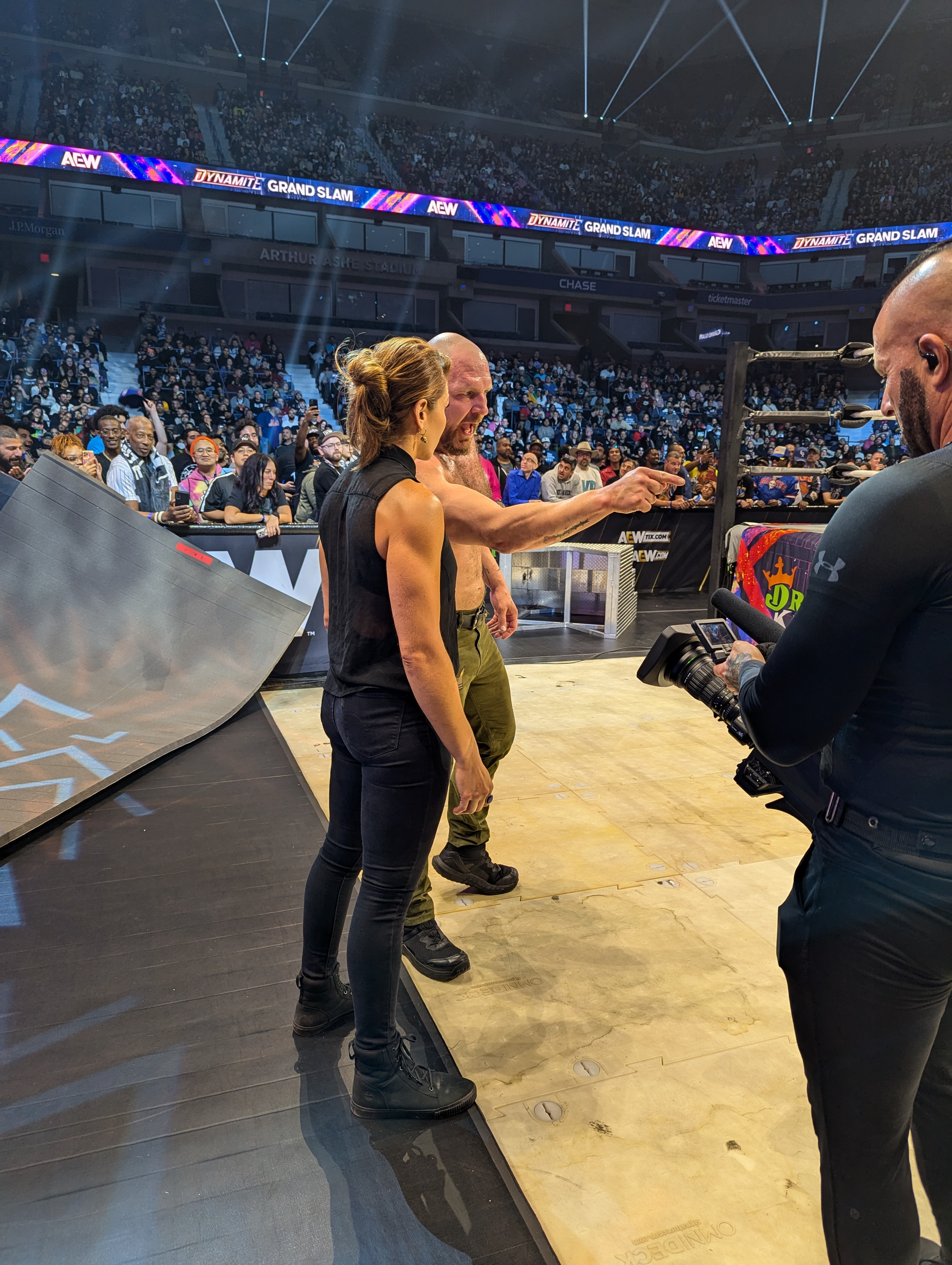
Shafir with Jon Moxley in September 2024

On the 28 August 2024 episode of Dynamite, Shafir aligned herself with Jon Moxley. On 7 September at All Out, Shafir assisted Moxley's faction Blackpool Combat Club in attacking Bryan Danielson, officially joining the group in the process. In November 2024, the Blackpool Combat Club rebranded to the "Death Riders" a nod to Moxley's nickname in NJPW. After Moxley defeated Danielson to win the AEW World Championship, Shafir would be the main carrier of the briefcase that Moxley put the championship belt in. During Moxley's world title reign from October 2024 to July 2025, Shafir and the other members of the Death Riders would constantly interfere in Moxley's title defenses to help him retain.

On 25 May 2025 at Double or Nothing, the Death Riders teamed with The Young Bucks, losing to Kenny Omega, Swerve Strickland, Willow Nightingale, and The Opps (Samoa Joe, Powerhouse Hobbs, and Katsuyori Shibata) in an Anarchy in the Arena match. On 12 November at Blood & Guts, Shafir competed in the first ever women's Blood and Guts match, where her team was victorious. On 27 December at Worlds End, the Death Riders were defeated by "Timeless" Toni Storm, Roderick Strong, and The Conglomeration (Mark Briscoe and Orange Cassidy) in a Mixed Nuts Mayhem match.

In early 2026, Shafir continued to feud with Toni Storm. On February 14, 2026, at Grand Slam Australia, Shafir and Wheeler Yuta were defeated by Storm and Orange Cassidy in a hair match. Yuta took the fall and was forced to have his head shaved. At Revolution on March 15, Shafir was defeated by Storm in her first pay-per-view singles match. After the match, Shafir attacked Storm, who was distracted by a surprise appearance from Ronda Rousey. Following the death of stablemate Pac, Shafir and the rest of the Death Riders would turn face. At Full Gear on November 14, Shafir unsuccessfully challenged Mercedes Moné for the AEW Women's World Championship.

== Personal life ==
Shafir is a close friend of Ronda Rousey, who trained with her at Glendale Fighting Club, and had a similar background in judo. They lived together for a number of years in Venice, California, along with Shayna Baszler and Jessamyn Duke.

In December 2015, Shafir got engaged to professional wrestler Christopher Lindsey, better known as Roderick Strong. In 2017, Shafir gave birth to their first child. The two were married on 7 November 2018.

Shafir is Jewish.

== Mixed martial arts record ==
Professional record breakdown
3 matches	1 win	2 losses
By knockout	0	2
By submission	1	0
By decision	0	0

Res.	Record	Opponent	Method	Event	Date	Round	Time	Location	Notes
Loss	1–2	Amber Leibrock	TKO (punches)	Invicta FC 13: Cyborg vs. Van Duin	9 July 2015	1	0:37	Las Vegas, Nevada, United States	
Loss	1–1	Amanda Bell	KO (punches)	LOP Chaos at the Casino 5	10 August 2014	1	0:37	Inglewood, California, United States	
Win	1–0	Chandra Engel	Submission (armbar)	LOP Chaos at the Casino 4	12 April 2014	1	1:57	Inglewood, California, United States	

Amateur record breakdown		
5 matches	5 wins	0 losses
By knockout	0	0
By submission	5	0
By decision	0	0

Res.	Record	Opponent	Method	Event	Date	Round	Time	Location	Notes
Win	5–0	Nicole Upshaw	Submission (armbar)	U of MMA: Fight Night 5	9 February 2014	1	1:53	Los Angeles, California, United States	
Win	4–0	Tabitha Patterson	Submission (arm-triangle choke)	Tuff-N-Uff: Future Stars of MMA	29 November 2013	1	0:59	Las Vegas, Nevada, United States	
Win	3–0	Danielle Mack	Submission (armbar)	Tuff-N-Uff: Mayhem in Mesquite 2	23 March 2013	1	0:59	Mesquite, Nevada, United States	
Win	2–0	Becky Lewis	Submission (armbar)	Premier FC 12: Premier Fighting Championship 12	17 November 2012	1	2:03	Albany, New York, United States	
Win	1–0	Denise Goddard	Submission (armbar)	Premier FC 9: Battle to the Belt	20 May 2012	1	0:44	Holyoke, Massachusetts, United States	

== Championships and accomplishments ==
- Pro-Wrestling: EVE
  - Pro-Wrestling: EVE International Championship (1 time, current)
- Pro Wrestling Illustrated
  - PWI ranked her #68 in the 2025 PWI Top 250 Females
- Brii Combination Wrestling
  - BCW Heavyweight Championship (1 time)
- DEFY Wrestling
  - DEFY Women's Championship (1 time, current)
- Game Changer Wrestling
  - Bloodsport Women's Tournament (2024)

== Luchas de Apuestas record ==
Winner (wager)	Loser (wager)	Location	Event	Date	Notes
Orange Cassidy and Toni Storm (hair)	Wheeler Yuta and Marina Shafir (hair) (Note: Only Yuta was required to shave his hair.)	Sydney, Australia	Grand Slam Australia	February 14, 2026	
