= Progress Proteus Championship =

British professional wrestling championship

- The Progress Proteus Championship belt

Details
- Promotion: Progress Wrestling
- Date established: 21 July 2019
- Current champion: Dijak
- Date won: 25 October 2026
Statistics
- First champion: Paul Robinson
- Longest reign: Paul Robinson (1,869 days)
- Shortest reign: Simon Miller (172 days)
- Oldest champion: Simon Miller (39 years, 294 days)
- Youngest champion: Paul Robinson (31 years, 65 days)
- Heaviest champion: Dijak (260 lbs)
- Lightest champion: Paul Robinson (141 lbs)

The Progress Proteus Championship is a professional wrestling championship created and promoted by the British professional wrestling promotion Progress Wrestling. The title is unique in that its champion decides the stipulation of the title defence. The inaugural champion was Paul Robinson. The current champion is Dijak, who is in his first reign. He won the title by defeating Paul Walter Hauser at Chapter 199: Bonestorm on 25 October 2026.

== Title history ==
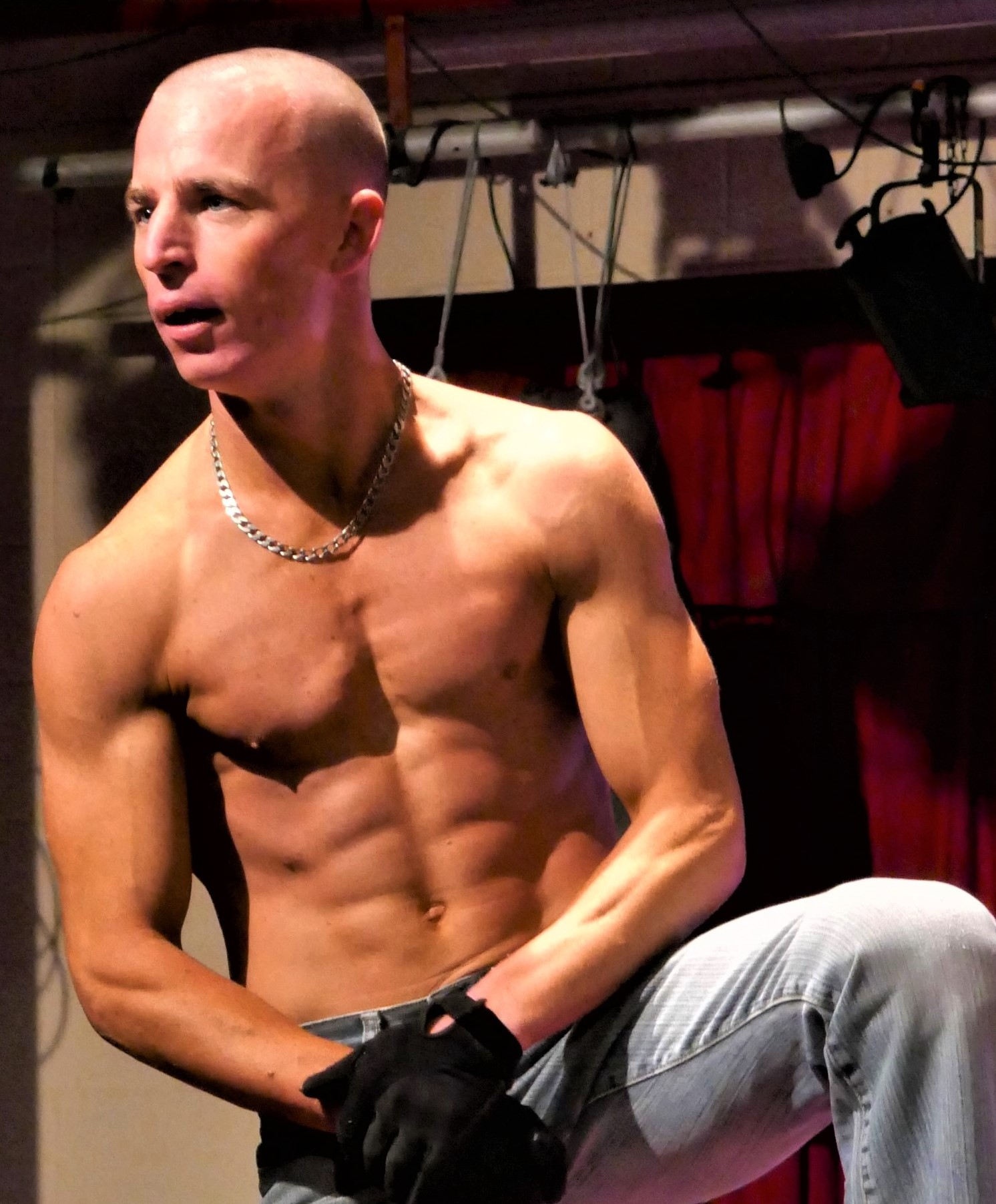
Inaugural champion Paul Robinson

On 21 July 2019, Progress Wrestling co-founder Jim Smallman unveiled the PROGRESS Proteus Championship. The title was established to replace the Progress Atlas Championship, which was unified with the Progress World Championship. Named after the shape-shifting Greek sea god Proteus, the title features a unique stipulation where the reigning champion can determine the rules for their title defenses, subject to the promotion's approval. While intended as a replacement, the Progress Atlas Championship was later revived in April 2022 at Chapter 133: Stop Motion Skeleton Battle.

=== Inaugural Rumble match ===
The inaugural Progress Proteus Champion was crowned in a 30-person rumble match at Chapter 95: Still Chasing in London, England on 15 September 2019. The winner was Paul Robinson.

Elimination table

– Winner

| Draw | Entrant | Order | Eliminated by | Elimination(s) |
|---|---|---|---|---|
| 1 | Paul Robinson | — | Winner | 2 |
| 2 | Ilja Dragunov | 28 | William Eaver | 4 |
| 3 | Travis Banks | 16 | NIWA | 3 |
| 4 | Dani Luna | 9 | Charli Evans and Millie McKenzie | 0 |
| 5 | Connor Mills | 1 | Spike Trivet | 0 |
| 6 | Spike Trivet | 11 | Due to injury | 1 |
| 7 | Danny Duggan | 29 | Paul Robinson | 2 |
| 8 | Dan Moloney | 10 | Paul Robinson | 0 |
| 9 | Chakara | 5 | Los Federales Santos Jr. | 0 |
| 10 | Sugar Dunkerton | 4 | Chief Deputy Dunne | 0 |
| 11 | Martina | 2 | Chief Deputy Dunne | 0 |
| 12 | Gene Munny | 3 | Chief Deputy Dunne | 0 |
| 13 | Los Federales Santos Jr. | 8 | Chuck Mambo | 2 |
| 14 | Chief Deputy Dunne | 7 | Chuck Mambo | 3 |
| 15 | Vacant | 6 | Los Federales Santos Jr. | 0 |
| 16 | Chuck Mambo | 26 | Ilja Dragunov | 2 |
| 17 | The OJMO | 25 | Danny Duggan | 0 |
| 18 | Millie McKenzie | 22 | Chris Brookes | 2 |
| 19 | Charli Evans | 21 | Chris Brookes | 2 |
| 20 | Roy Johnson | 14 | NIWA, TK Cooper, and Travis Banks | 1 |
| 21 | Jonathan Gresham | 12 | Eddie Kingston | 0 |
| 22 | Mike Bailey | 13 | Travis Banks | 0 |
| 23 | NIWA | 17 | Ilja Dragunov | 2 |
| 24 | Eddie Kingston | 15 | Travis Banks | 1 |
| 25 | TK Cooper | 18 | Ilja Dragunov | 1 |
| 26 | Sid Scala | 19 | Danny Duggan | 0 |
| 27 | Fraser Thomas | 20 | Charli Evans and Millie McKenzie | 0 |
| 28 | Chris Brookes | 23 | Chris Roberts | 2 |
| 29 | Chris Roberts | 24 | William Eaver | 1 |
| 30 | William Eaver | 27 | Ilja Dragunov | 2 |

== Reigns ==
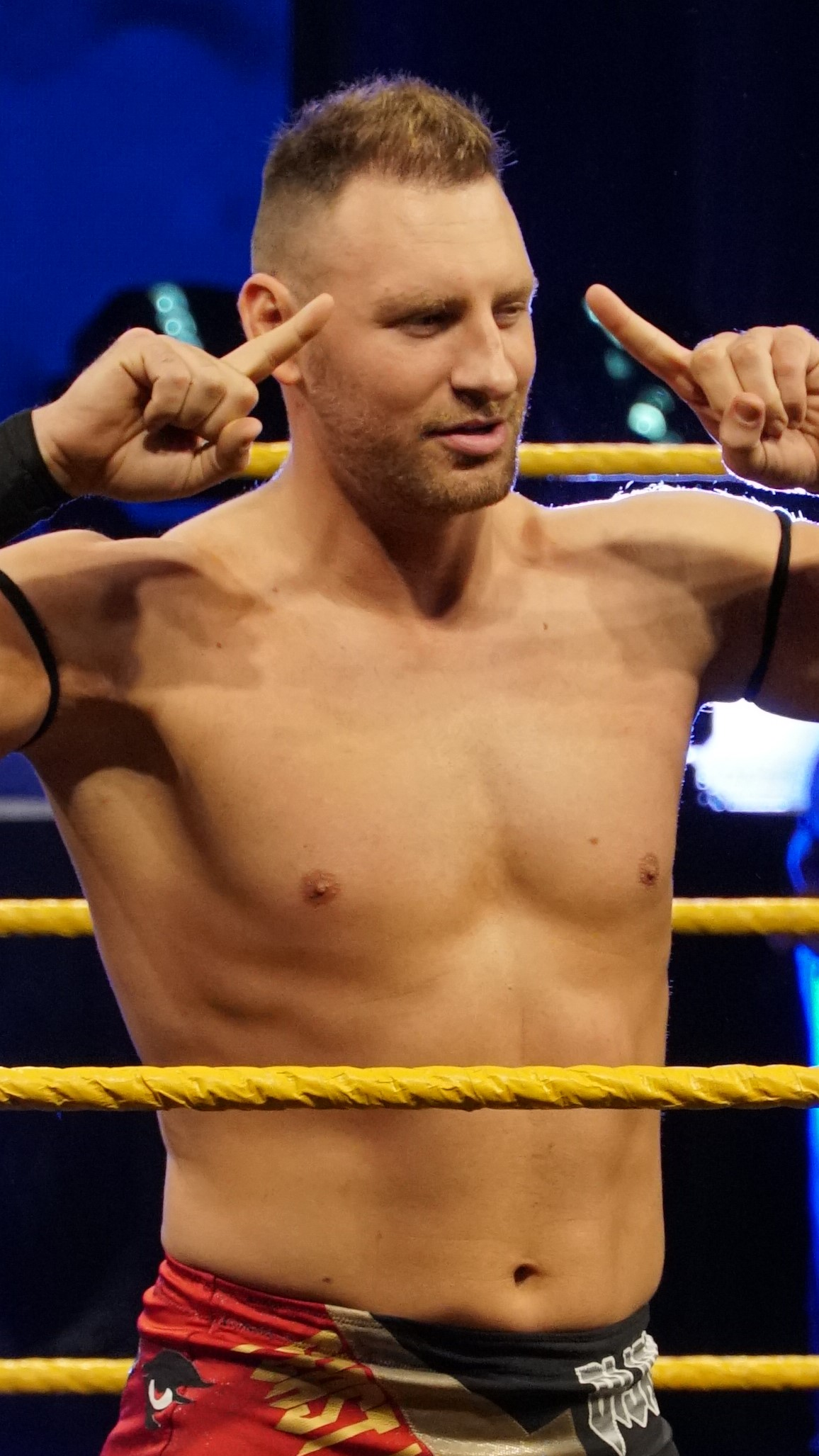
Current champion Dijak

Overall, there have been four reigns among four champions. Paul Robinson is the inaugural champion, who held the title the longest at 1,869 days with nine successful title defenses. Meanwhile, Simon Miller held the title the shortest at 172 days with seven successful title defenses. Miller is the oldest champion at 39 years and 294 days, while Robinson is the youngest champion at 31 years and 65 days.

Dijak is the current champion in his first reign. He won the title by defeating Paul Walter Hauser at Chapter 199: Bonestorm on 25 October 2026, in Camden, London, England.

Key
| No. | Overall reign number |
| Reign | Reign number for the specific champion |
| Days | Number of days held |
| Defenses | Number of successful defenses |

| No. | Champion | Championship change | | | Reign statistics | | | Notes | Ref. |
| No. | Champion | Date | Event | Location | Reign | Days | Defenses | Notes | Ref. |
|---|---|---|---|---|---|---|---|---|---|
| 1 | Paul Robinson | 15 September 2019 | Chapter 95: Still Chasing | Haringey, London, England | 1 | 1,869 | 9 | This was a 30-person rumble match, where Robinson last eliminated Danny Duggan to become the inaugural champion. Robinson declared he could only lose the title via knockout or submission. The title was inactive between 2021 and 2024; however, upon his return to the promotion at Chapter 167: One Bump Or Two? on 21 April 2024, Robinson declared his reign uninterrupted. | |
| 2 | Simon Miller | 27 October 2024 | Chapter 172: Werewolves Of London | Camden, London, England | 1 | 172 | 7 | Miller declared that the stipulations for his title defenses be determined by fan polls conducted through social media or during live events. | |
| 3 | Paul Walter Hauser | 17 April 2025 | Chapter 179: Progress Las Vegas | Paradise, Nevada, U.S. | 1 | 556 | 7 | This was a five-way match, also involving Effy, Adam Priest, and Charles Crowley. Hauser declared that he would defend the title in a Fans Bring the Weapons match. | |
| 4 | Dijak | 25 October 2026 | Chapter 199: Bonestorm | Camden, London, England | 1 | 3+ | 0 | This was Hauser's Open challenge. | |
