= Simon Miller (wrestler) =

English professional wrestler, journalist and presenter

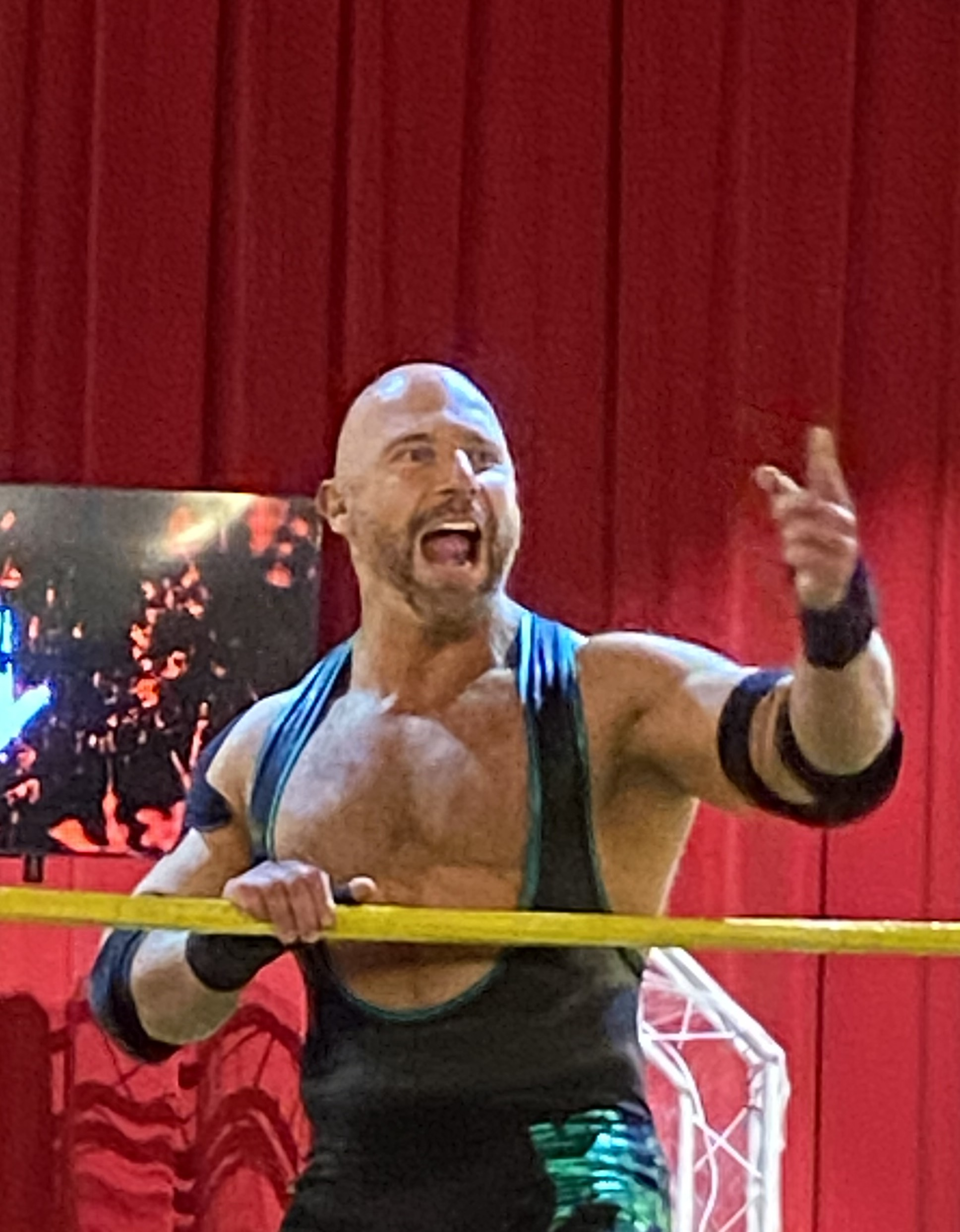
- Miller in October 2025

Personal information
- Born: Simon Miller London, England

Professional wrestling career
- Ring name(s): Simon Miller; Alexander Swagger
- Debut: 2018

Simon Miller (born 7 January 1985) is an English professional wrestler, journalist and presenter. He currently performs on the independent circuit. He is best known for his work with WhatCulture. Throughout his wrestling career he has worked with Progress Wrestling, DEFY, Impact Wrestling and IPW (IPW:UK).

== Professional wrestling career ==
=== Independent circuit (2018–present) ===
Miller made his debut on 28 April 2018 at Defiant Wrestling, participating in a Battle royal. On October 27, 2023 at Impact Wrestling: Turning Point he was defeated by rival Joe Hendry.

=== Progress Wrestling (2022–present) ===
Miller made his debut in Progress Wrestling at Chapter 147: Unboxing Live V - Deal Or No Deal on December 30, 2022, where he fell short to Tate Mayfairs in singles competition.

On October 27, 2024, at Progress Chapter 172: Werewolves of London, Miller defeated Paul Robinson to win the Progress Proteus Championship, ending the latter's reign at 1,869 days which was one of the longest professional wrestling championship reigns of the 21st century. He dropped the title at Chapter 179: Progress Las Vegas on April 17, 2025 to Paul Walter Hauser in a five-way match which also involved Effy, Adam Priest and Charles Crowley.

== Personal life ==
Miller is Jewish. He is a lifelong Arsenal supporter.

== Championships and accomplishments ==
- KAPOW Wrestling
  - KAPOW Tag Team Championship (1 time) – with Lee Buff
- Progress Wrestling
  - Progress Proteus Championship (1 time)
- Pro Wrestling Chaos
  - PWC Internet Championship (1 time)
- Pro Wrestling Illustrated
  - Ranked No. 350 of the top 500 singles wrestlers in the PWI 500 in 2025
- Pro Wrestling Society
  - PWS Loserweight Championship (1 time)
- Ultimate British Wrestling
  - UBW Infinity Championship (1 time)
- Ultimate Pro Wrestling
  - UPW Heavyweight Championship (1 time)
  - UPW World Heavyweight Championship (1 time)
