= DEFY Wrestling =

American professional wrestling promotion

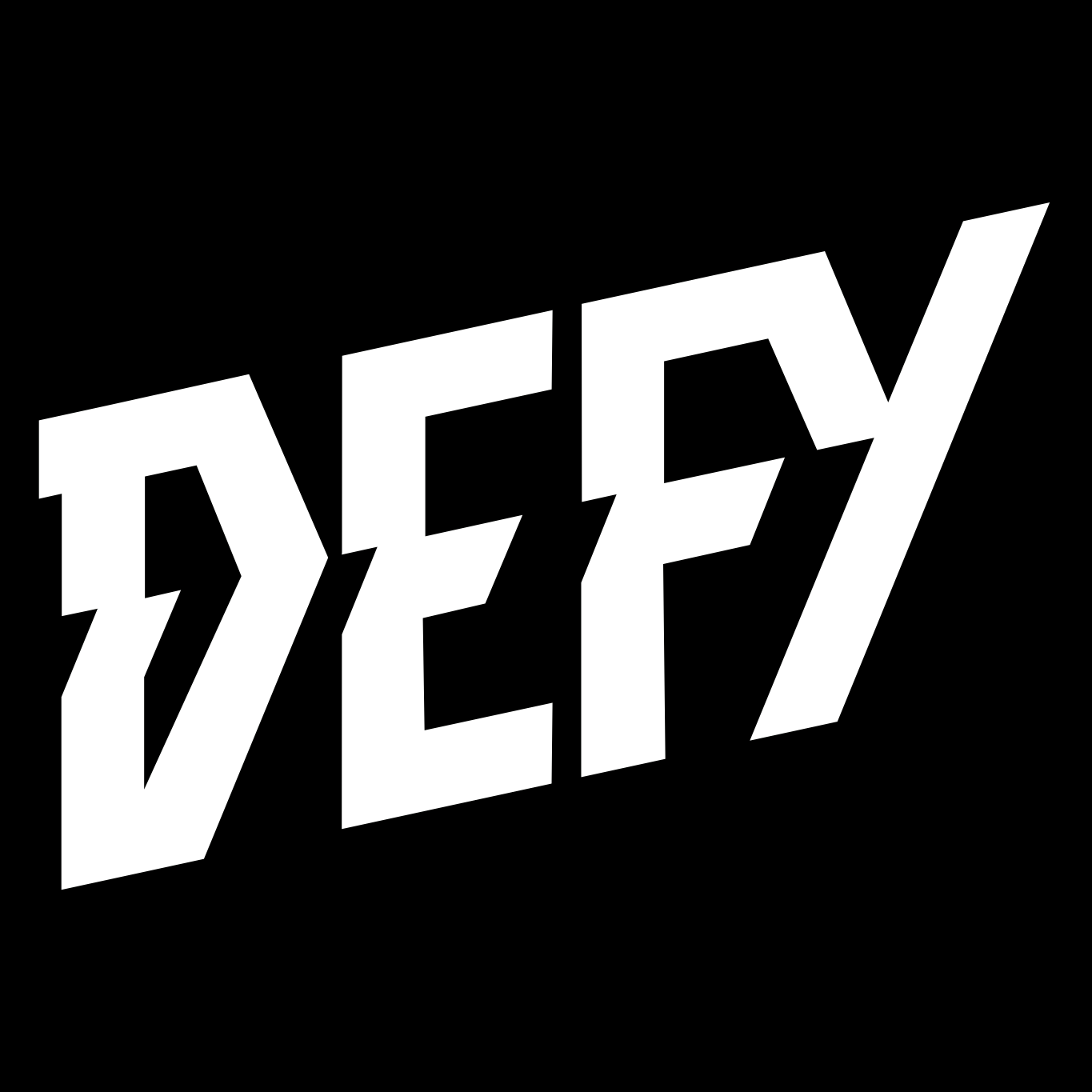
- Acronym: DEFY
- Founded: 2017
- Headquarters: Seattle, Washington, United States
- Founders: Matt Farmer; Jim Perry
- Owners: Matt Farmer; Jim Perry
- Website: https://www.defywrestling.com/

DEFY Wrestling is an American independent professional wrestling promotion based out of Seattle, Washington. DEFY was created in 2017 after founders Jim Perry (stage name, born James Gilmer) and Matt Farmer successfully petitioned the Washington state government (specifically the Washington State Department of Licensing) to alter laws around professional wrestling, which they had argued had severely impacted the ability of promoters to run small professional wrestling events in the state since the early 1990s. Since its launch in 2017, DEFY has risen to a high level of prominence on the American Independent circuit, in part because of its association as the "home" of emerging national wrestling stars Swerve Strickland, Darby Allin and Nick Wayne.

As DEFY has grown, it has begun to hold events outside of Seattle, including locations such as Tacoma, Yakima, Portland, Oregon, Los Angeles and London, England. Stylistically, promoter Matt Farmer has compared the difference between DEFY and WWE as being like that of Alternative Rock and Pop Music.

== History ==
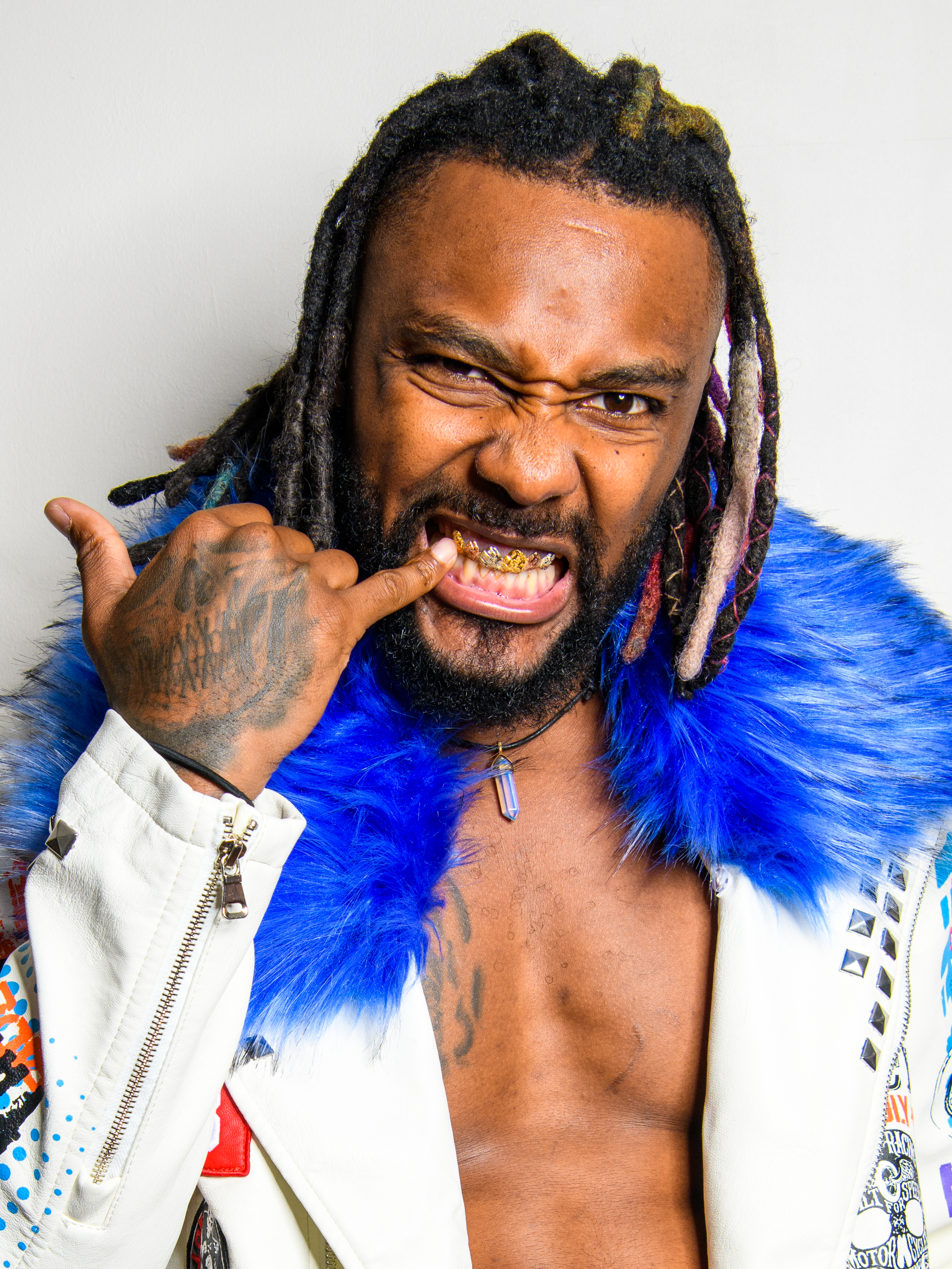
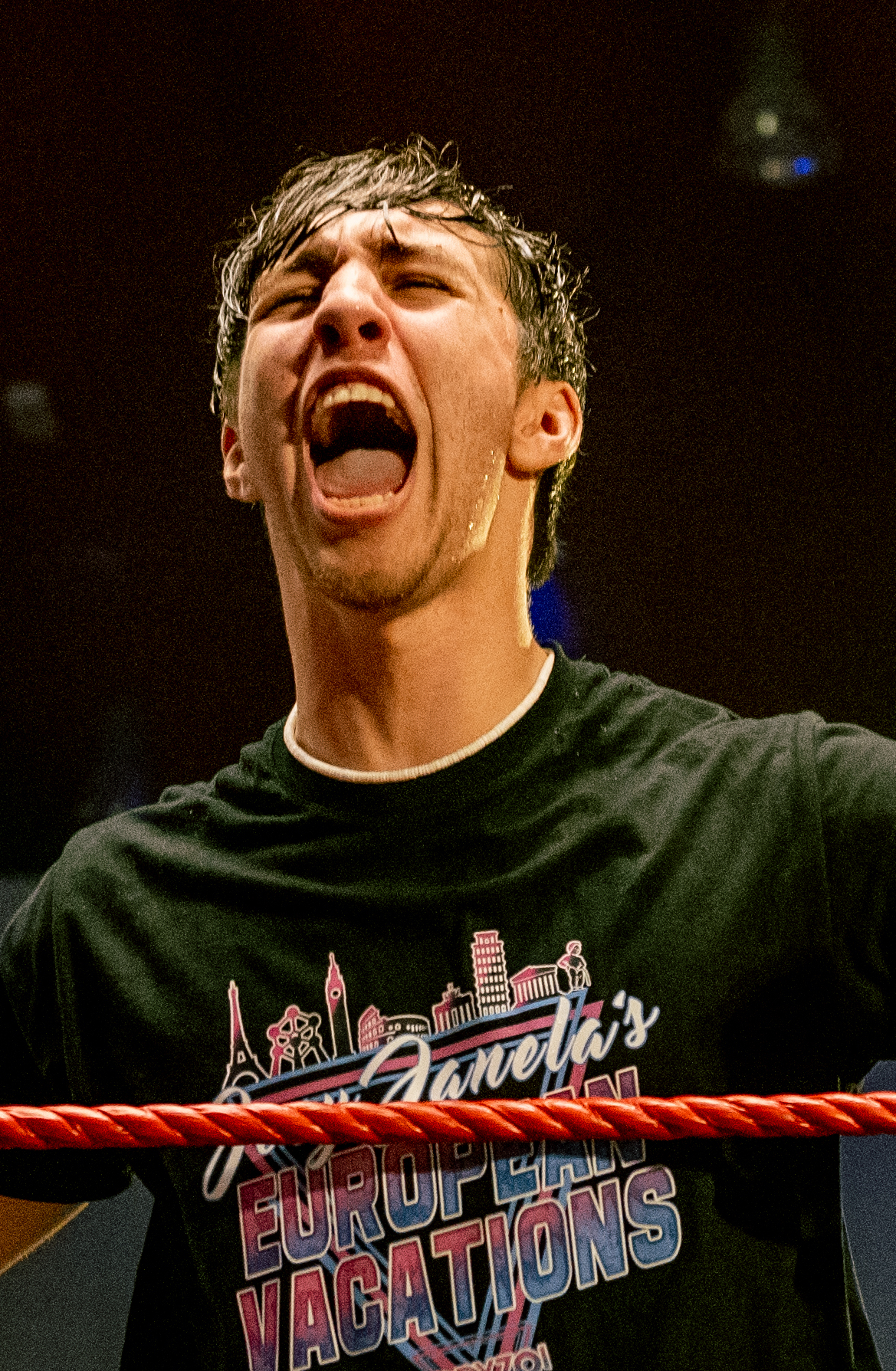
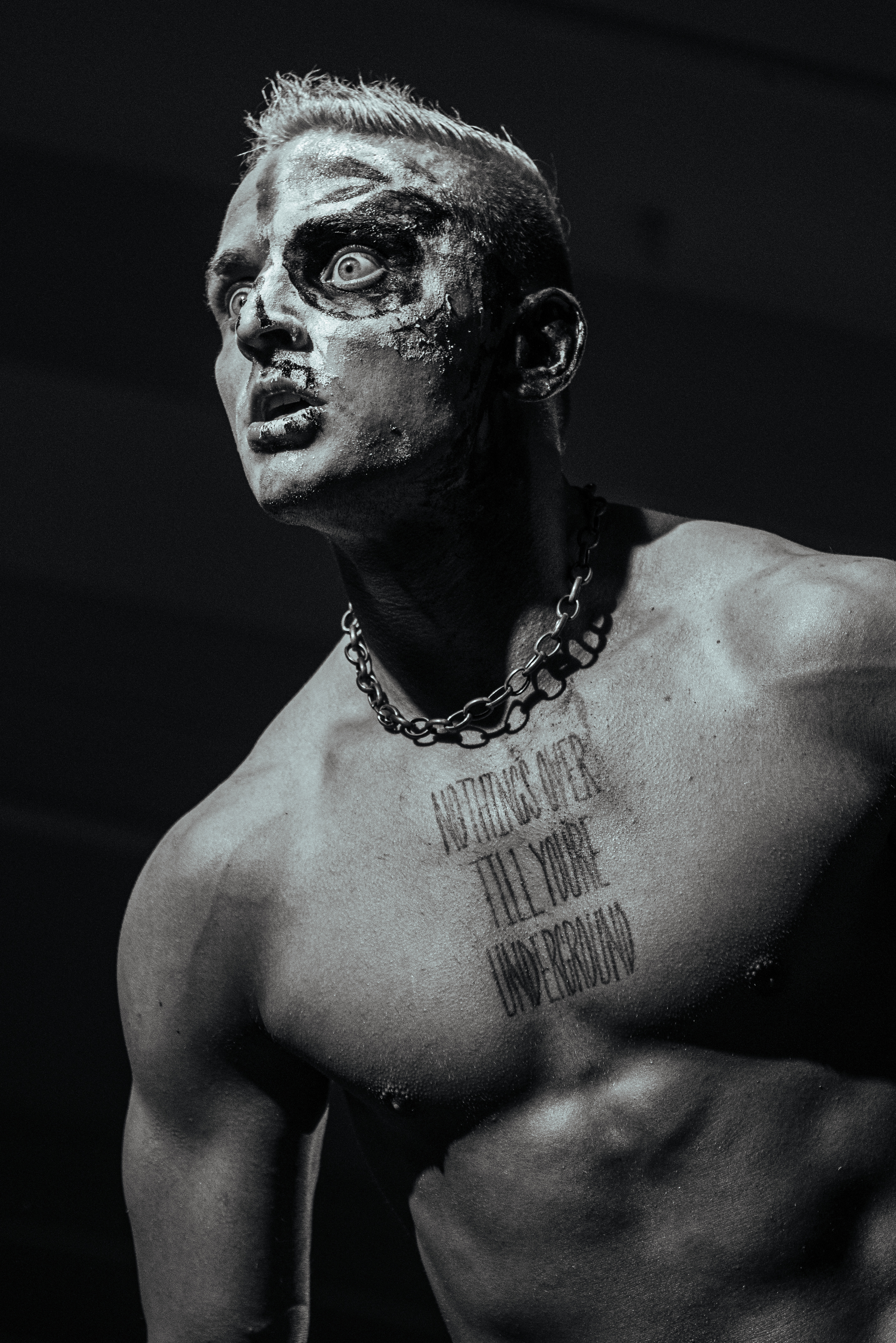
Swerve Strickland, Nick Wayne and Darby Allin are all Washington natives, and are closely associated with DEFY Wrestling

There is a significant history of professional wrestling in the Pacific Northwest; Between 1925 and 1992 the region was primarily serviced by the well-regarded Pacific Northwest Wrestling (PNW) promotion (also known as Portland Wrestling). However, following the death of the wrestling territory system and the rise of the World Wrestling Federation, PNW fell too by the wayside. Further reinforcing this withering of regional professional wrestling were several regulations introduced to Washington by the Washington State Department of Licensing, which made the cost of producing a professional wrestling event highly prohibitive for smaller organizations. For example, until 2017 the Department of Licensing required all professional wrestling promoters to pay them 6% of the gross income made from any event as well as $1 for every ticket sold at the show. Promoters were also required to obtain a license for every performer featured on the show.

In 2017, following many years of lobbying by Farmer and Perry as well as other members of the professional wrestling community, these requirements were scrapped and Farmer and Perry launched DEFY Wrestling to take advantage of the new era. DEFY would make use of Perry's professional background in marketing and Farmer's background as a professional wrestling historian. The very first DEFY show was headlined by Swerve Strickland challenging Cody Rhodes for the then-active GFW NEX*GEN Championship. Subsequent shows would feature Strickland, Darby Allin and Nick Wayne prominently, as well as female talent such as Vert Vixen and British Columbia's Nicole Matthews.

As of 2024, almost all of DEFY's events in Seattle have taken place in the historic Washington Hall, which has a capacity of 500 to 800 people depending on the setup.

On 9 February 2024, it was announced that DEFY Wrestling would "merge" with Progress Wrestling, an independent promotion based in London, England. It was created to bring a "global presence" to both brands and aid further expansion plans.

On 26 May 2026, it was announced that both DEFY Wrestling and Progress Wrestling were purchased by Damian Mackle and Nicola Glencross. Three months later, the founders bought DEFY back.

== Championships ==
As of October 28, 2026,

| Championship | Current champion(s) | Reign | Date won | Days held | Location | Notes |
|---|---|---|---|---|---|---|
| DEFY World Championship | Bryan Keith | 1 | September 19, 2025 | 404 | Seattle, WA | Defeated Clark Connors at Aeon |
| DEFY Lucha International Championship | Trey Miguel | 1 | October 1, 2026 | 27 | Detroit, MI | Last eliminated Alan Angels in an eight-person elimination match that also involved Gringo Loco, "Blackheart" Lio Rush, Jason Hotch, Isaiah Broner, Amazanga, and Charles Crowley at All Heart; the title was subsequently renamed to the DEFY Lucha International Championship from the DEFY PrimoLucha Championship. Previous champion Kevin Blackwood vacated the title upon retiring from professional wrestling. |
| DEFY Pacific Northwest Heavyweight Championship | Guillermo Rosas | 1 | December 27, 2025 | 305 | Seattle, WA | Defeated Casey Feirerra, and Cole Rivera in a triple threat match at Aeon to become the inaugural champion. |
| DEFY Tag Team Championship | Sinner and Saint (Judas Icarus and Travis Williams) | 1 (1, 1) | December 29, 2024 | 668 | Seattle, WA | Defeated Los Desperados (Arez and Gringo Loco) at Blueprint. |
| DEFY Women's Championship | Marina Shafir | 1 | May 10, 2024 | 901 | Seattle, WA | Defeated Vert Vixen at Here And Now!. |

=== DEFY Lucha International Championship ===
DEFY Lucha International Championship

Details
- Promotion: DEFY Wrestling
- Date established: June 24, 2023
- Current champion: Trey Miguel
- Date won: October 1, 2026

Other names
- DEFY PrimoLucha Championship (2023–2026)
Statistics
- First champion: Gringo Loco
- Most reigns: All titleholders (1 reign)
- Longest reign: Guullermo Rosas (462 days)
- Shortest reign: Cody Chhun (83 days)
- Heaviest champion: Gringo Loco (253 lb (115 kg))
- Lightest champion: Guillermo Rosas (205 lb (93 kg))

The DEFY Lucha International Championship is a professional wrestling championship created and promoted by the American promotion DEFY Wrestling, having been contested under lucha libre rules. There have been a total of five reigns shared between five different champions. The current champion is Trey Miguel, who is in his first reign. He won the vacant title by defeating Alan Angels, who he last eliminated, Gringo Loco, "Blackheart" Lio Rush, Jason Hotch, Isaiah Broner, Amazanga, and Charles Crowley in an eight-person elimination match at All Heart in Detroit, Michigan, on October 1, 2026. Previous champion Kevin Blackwood vacated the title due to retiring from professional wrestling.

Key
| No. | Overall reign number |
| Reign | Reign number for the specific champion |
| Days | Number of days held |
| Defenses | Number of successful defenses |
| <1 | Reign lasted less than a day |
| + | Current reign is changing daily |

| No. | Champion | Championship change | | | Reign statistics | | | Notes | Ref. |
| No. | Champion | Date | Event | Location | Reign | Days | Defenses | Notes | Ref. |
|---|---|---|---|---|---|---|---|---|---|
| 1 | Gringo Loco | June 24, 2023 | Heathens | Portland, OR | 1 | 147 | 1 | Defeated Aramis and Laredo Kid in a three-way match to become the inaugural champion. | |
| 2 | Cody Chhun | November 18, 2023 | Pantheon | Seattle, WA | 1 | 83 | 1 | | |
| 3 | Guillermo Rosas | February 9, 2024 | Seven | Seattle, WA | 1 | 462 | 0 | This was a Defy 2 Survive lucky 7 match also involving Big Damo and Matt Brannigan. | |
| 4 | Kevin Blackwood | May 16, 2025 | Fatal Fantasy | Seattle, WA | 1 | 280 | 0 | This was a scramble match also involving Cody Chhun, Eddie Pearl, Evan Rivers and Miles Deville. | |
| — | Vacated | February 20, 2026 | — | — | — | — | — | The title was rendered vacant after Blackwood retired from professional wrestling. | |
| 5 | Trey Miguel | October 1, 2026 | All Heart | Detroit, MI | 1 | 27+ | 0 | Last eliminated Alan Angels in an eight-person elimination match that also involved Gringo Loco, "Blackheart" Lio Rush, Jason Hotch, Isaiah Broner, Amazanga, and Charles Crowley; the title was subsequently renamed to the DEFY Lucha International Championship. | |

=== DEFY Pacific Northwest Heavyweight Championship ===
DEFY Pacific Northwest Heavyweight Championship

Details
- Promotion: DEFY Wrestling
- Date established: December 27, 2025
- Current champion: Guillermo Rosas
- Date won: December 27, 2025
Statistics
- First champion: Guillermo Rosas
- Most reigns: Guillermo Rosas (1 reign)
- Longest reign: Guillermo Rosas (1 day)
- Shortest reign: Guillermo Rosas (1 day)

The DEFY Pacific Northwest Heavyweight Championship is a professional wrestling championship created and promoted by the American promotion DEFY Wrestling. There has been a total of one reign shared between one champion. The current and inaugural champion is Guillermo Rosas who is in his first reign.

Key
| No. | Overall reign number |
| Reign | Reign number for the specific champion |
| Days | Number of days held |
| Defenses | Number of successful defenses |
| <1 | Reign lasted less than a day |
| + | Current reign is changing daily |

| No. | Champion | Championship change | | | Reign statistics | | | Notes | Ref. |
| No. | Champion | Date | Event | Location | Reign | Days | Defenses | Notes | Ref. |
|---|---|---|---|---|---|---|---|---|---|
| 1 | Guillermo Rosas | December 27, 2025 | Aeon | Seattle, WA | 1 | 305+ | 0 | Defeated Casey Feirerra and Cole Rivera in a triple threat match to become the inaugural champion. | |

=== DEFY Tag Team Championship ===
DEFY Tag Team Championship

Details
- Promotion: DEFY Wrestling
- Date established: September 8, 2018
- Current champions: Sinner And Saint (Judas Icarus and Travis Williams)
- Date won: December 29, 2024
Statistics
- First champions: Ethan HD and Mike Santiago
- Most reigns: As a team (2 reigns): The Bollywood Boyz (Gurv Sihra and Harv Sihra); Midnight Heat (Eddie Pearl and Ricky Gibson)
- Longest reign: Midnight Heat (Eddie Pearl and Ricky Gibson) (743 days)
- Shortest reign: State Of Emergency (Miles Deville and Sebastian Wolfe) (21 days)
- Oldest champion: Christopher Daniels (52 years, 115 days)
- Heaviest champion: Warbeast (Jacob Fatu and Josef Samael) (503 lb (228 kg) combined)

The DEFY Tag Team Championship is a professional wrestling tag team championship created and promoted by the American promotion DEFY Wrestling. There have been a total of eleven reigns shared between nine teams consisting of eighteen different wrestlers. The current champions are Sinner And Saint (Judas Icarus and Travis Williams), who are in their first reign as a team and individually.

Key
| No. | Overall reign number |
| Reign | Reign number for the specific team—reign numbers for the individuals are in parentheses, if different |
| Days | Number of days held |
| Defenses | Number of successful defenses |
| <1 | Reign lasted less than a day |
| + | Current reign is changing daily |

| No. | Champion | Championship change | | | Reign statistics | | | Notes | Ref. |
| No. | Champion | Date | Event | Location | Reign | Days | Defenses | Notes | Ref. |
|---|---|---|---|---|---|---|---|---|---|
| 1 | The American Guns (Ethan HD and Mike Santiago) | September 8, 2018 | DEFY Club | Seattle, WA | 1 | 133 | 3 | Defeated Violence Unlimited (Brody King and Tyler Bateman) in a tournament final to become the inaugural champions. | |
| 2 | One Percent (Jorel Nelson and Royce Isaacs) | January 19, 2019 | DEFY 2nd Anniversary Show | Seattle, WA | 1 | 69 | 1 | | |
| 3 | Warbeast (Jacob Fatu and Josef Samael) | March 29, 2019 | PCW ULTRA Wrestle Summit 2019 | Los Angeles, CA | 1 | 308 | 8 | | |
| 4 | Midnight Heat (Eddie Pearl and Ricky Gibson) | January 31, 2020 | DEFY Year 3 | Los Angeles, CA | 1 | 743 | 10 | | |
| 5 | The Bollywood Boyz (Gurv Sihra and Harv Sihra) | February 12, 2022 | DEFY 5th Anniversary Show | Seattle, WA | 1 | 155 | 5 | This was a ladder match. | |
| 6 | Christopher Daniels and Swerve Strickland | July 17, 2022 | DEFY The World Is Yours | Seattle, WA | 1 | 34 | 0 | | |
| 7 | Midnight Heat (Eddie Pearl and Ricky Gibson) | August 20, 2022 | DEFY Doomsayers | Seattle, WA | 2 | 37 | 0 | This was a three-way tag team match also involving The Bollywood Boyz (Gurv Sihra and Harv Sihra). | |
| — | Vacated | September 26, 2022 | — | — | — | — | — | | |
| 8 | State Of Emergency (Miles Deville and Sebastian Wolfe) | October 8, 2022 | DEFY City Of Thorns | Portland, OR | 1 | 21 | 0 | Defeated The Bollywood Boyz (Gurv Sihra and Harv Sihra) and C4 (Cody Chhun and Guillermo Rosas) in a three-way tag team match to win the vacant titles. | |
| 9 | The Second Gear Crew (Mance Warner and Matthew Justice) | October 29, 2022 | DEFY Kingdom Come | Seattle, WA | 1 | 238 | 3 | | |
| 10 | The Bollywood Boyz (Gurv Sihra and Harv Sihra) | June 24, 2023 | DEFY Heathens | Portland, OR | 2 | 391 | 8 | | |
| 11 | C4 (Cody Chhun and Guillermo Rosas) | July 19, 2024 | DEFY For The Glory | Seattle, WA | 1 | 135 | 2 | This was a three-way match also involving Sinner and Saint (Travis Williams and Judas Icarus). | |
| 12 | Los Desperados (Arez and Gringo Loco) | December 1, 2024 | DEFY x Progress Onslaught (Night 2) | Chicago, IL | 1 | 28 | 0 | | |
| 13 | Sinner And Saint (Judas Icarus and Travis Williams) | December 29, 2024 | DEFY Blueprint | Seattle, WA | 1 | 668+ | 4 | | |

==== Combined reigns ====
As of 28 December 2025

| † | Indicates the current champion |

| Rank | Team | No. of reigns | Combined defenses | Combined days |
|---|---|---|---|---|
| 1 | Midnight Heat (Eddie Pearl and Ricky Gibson) | 2 | 10 | 780 |
| 2 | Sinner And Saint † (Judas Icarus and Travis Williams) | 1 | 4 | 668+ |
| 3 | The Bollywood Boyz (Gurv Sihra and Harv Sihra) | 2 | 13 | 391 |
| 4 | Warbeast (Jacob Fatu and Josef Samael) | 1 | 8 | 308 |
| 5 | The Second Gear Crew (Mance Warner and Matthew Justice) | 1 | 3 | 238 |
| 6 | C4 (Cody Chhun and Guillermo Rosas) | 1 | 2 | 135 |
| 7 | The American Guns (Ethan HD and Mike Santiago) | 1 | 3 | 133 |
| 8 | One Percent (Jorel Nelson and Royce Isaacs) | 1 | 1 | 69 |
| 9 | Christopher Daniels and Swerve Strickland | 1 | 0 | 34 |
| 10 | Los Desperados (Arez and Gringo Loco) | 1 | 0 | 28 |
| 11 | State Of Emergency (Miles Deville and Sebastian Wolfe) | 1 | 0 | 21 |

==== By wrestler ====
| Rank | Wrestler | No. of reigns | Combined defenses | Combined days |
|---|---|---|---|---|
| 1 | Eddie Pearl | 2 | 10 | 780 |
| 1 | Ricky Gibson | 2 | 10 | 780 |
| 3 | Judas Icarus † | 1 | 4 | 668+ |
| 3 | Travis Williams † | 1 | 4 | 668+ |
| 5 | Gurv Sihra | 2 | 13 | 391 |
| 5 | Harv Sihra | 2 | 13 | 391 |
| 7 | Jacob Fatu | 1 | 8 | 308 |
| 7 | Josef Samael | 1 | 8 | 308 |
| 9 | Mance Warner | 1 | 3 | 238 |
| 9 | Matthew Justice | 1 | 3 | 238 |
| 11 | Cody Chhun | 1 | 2 | 135 |
| 11 | Guillermo Rosas | 1 | 2 | 135 |
| 13 | Ethan HD | 1 | 3 | 133 |
| 13 | Mike Santiago | 1 | 3 | 133 |
| 15 | Jorel Nelson | 1 | 1 | 69 |
| 15 | Royce Isaacs | 1 | 1 | 69 |
| 17 | Christopher Daniels | 1 | 0 | 34 |
| 17 | Swerve Strickland | 1 | 0 | 34 |
| 19 | Arez | 1 | 0 | 28 |
| 19 | Gringo Loco | 1 | 0 | 28 |
| 21 | Miles Deville | 1 | 0 | 21 |
| 21 | Sebastian Wolfe | 1 | 0 | 21 |

=== DEFY Women's Championship ===
DEFY Women's Championship

Details
- Promotion: DEFY Wrestling
- Date established: October 29, 2022
- Current champion: Marina Shafir
- Date won: May 10, 2024
Statistics
- First champion: Vert Vixen
- Most reigns: All titleholders (1 reign)
- Longest reign: Vert Vixen (559 days)
- Oldest champion: Marina Shafir (36 years, 26 days)
- Youngest champion: Vert Vixen (32 years, 295 days)

The DEFY Women's Championship is a women's professional wrestling championship created and promoted by the American promotion DEFY Wrestling. There have been a total of two reigns shared between two different champions. The current champion is Marina Shafir who is in her first reign.

Key
| No. | Overall reign number |
| Reign | Reign number for the specific champion |
| Days | Number of days held |
| Defenses | Number of successful defenses |
| <1 | Reign lasted less than a day |
| + | Current reign is changing daily |

| No. | Champion | Championship change | | | Reign statistics | | | Notes | Ref. |
| No. | Champion | Date | Event | Location | Reign | Days | Defenses | Notes | Ref. |
|---|---|---|---|---|---|---|---|---|---|
| 1 | Vert Vixen | October 29, 2022 | DEFY Kingdom Come | Seattle, WA | 1 | 559 | 16 | Defeated Liiza Hall to become the inaugural champion. | |
| 2 | Marina Shafir | May 10, 2024 | DEFY Here And Now! | Seattle, WA | 1 | 901+ | 7 | | |
