= Dolina =

Dolina (or Dolyna in Ukrainian, Долина) is a Slavic toponym, meaning "valley" or "dale". It may refer to:

== Places ==
=== Poland ===
- Dolina, Lower Silesian Voivodeship (south-west Poland)
- Dolina, Łódź Voivodeship (central Poland)
- Dolina, Lublin Voivodeship (east Poland)
- Dolina, Warmian-Masurian Voivodeship (north Poland)
- Dolina, West Pomeranian Voivodeship (north-west Poland)

=== Romania ===
- Dolina, a village in Leorda Commune, Botoșani County
- Dolina, a village in Cornereva Commune, Caraș-Severin County
- Dolina (Leorda), a left tributary of the Sitna in Botoșani County
- Dolina, a right tributary of the Sitna in Botoșani County

=== Slovenia ===
- Dolina, Kamnik
- Dolina pri Lendavi, a village in the Municipality of Lendava, northeastern Slovenia
- Dolina, Puconci, a village in the Municipality of Puconci, northeastern Slovenia
- Dolina, Tržič, a village in the Municipality of Tržič, northwestern Slovenia

=== Ukraine ===
- Dolyna, a city in Ukraine

Villages:

- Dolyna, Ratne Raion, Volyn Oblast
- Dolyna, Yurivka Raion, Dnipro Oblast
- Dolyna, Slovianskyi Raion, Donetsk Oblast
- Dolyna, Tokmak Raion, Zaporizhzhia Oblast
- Dolyna, Tlumach Raion, Ivano-Frankivsk Oblast
- Dolyna, Obukhiv Raion, Kyiv Oblast
- Dolyna, Znamianka Raion, Kropyvnytskyi Oblast
- Dolyna, Poltava Raion, Poltava Oblast
- Dolyna, Reshetylivka Raion, Poltava Oblast
- Dolyna, Mlyniv Raion, Rivne Oblast
- Dolyna, Hlukhiv Raion, Sumy Oblast
- Dolyna, Nedryhailiv Raion, Sumy Oblast
- Dolyna, Terebovlia Raion, Ternopil Oblast
- Dolyna, Chortkiv Raion, Ternopil Oblast

Also:

- Dolyna, Nature Reserve in Khmelnytskyi Oblast

=== Other countries ===
- Dolina (Grafenstein), a village in the Municipality of Grafenstein, Carinthia, southern Austria
- Dolina, Zavidovići, a village in Zavidovići municipality, Bosnia and Herzegovina
- Dolina, Bulgaria, a village in Kaolinovo Municipality, Shumen Province, Bulgaria
- Dolina, Croatia, a village near Vrbje, Croatia
- Dolina, Ústí nad Labem Region (German: Dörnsdorf), on the Preßnitz river, Czech Republic
- San Dorligo della Valle, or Dolina in Slovene, a comune of Italy

== People ==
- Dolina, the feminine form of the Slavic surname Dolin
- Dolina Wehipeihana, New Zealand Māori dancer, choreographer and theatre producer.
- Alejandro Dolina (born 1944), Argentine writer, broadcaster and tango expert

== Other ==
- Dolina River (disambiguation)
- Dolina, a 1973 film by Štefan Uher
- Dolina, a word for valley in some Slavic languages
