= Alić =

Alić is a Bosnian patronymic surname formed by adding the Slavic diminutive suffix -ić to the common male Muslim name Ali (thus literally meaning "(little) son of Ali") and may refer to:

- Almir Alić (writer) (born 1970), Bosnian writer
- Almir Alić (footballer) (born 1984), Bosnian footballer
- Božidar Alić (1954–2020), Croatian actor
- Dijana Alić (born 19??), Bosnian architect and academic who lives in Australia
- Derviš-beg Alić Sarvanović (fl. 1597), Ottoman governor of the sanjak of Montenegro
- Džemaludin Alić (born 1947), Bosnian writer
- Enes Alić (born 1999), Bosnian footballer
- Ermin Alić (born 1992), Montenegrin footballer
- Fikret Alić (born 19??), Bosniak survivor of the 1992 Keraterm and Trnopolje concentration camps
- Hamza Alić (born 1979), Bosnian shot putter
- Husejin Alić, Croatian politician
- Jasmina Musabegović born Jasmina Alić (born 1941), Bosnian Writer
- Salih Alić (1906–1982), Bosnian songwriter
- Sead Alić (born 1956), Croatian philosopher and writer
- Sedin Alić (born 1989), Danish born Bosnian footballer

== See also ==
- Alići (Montenegro)
- Alići (Bosnia)
