= Proper Micro NV =

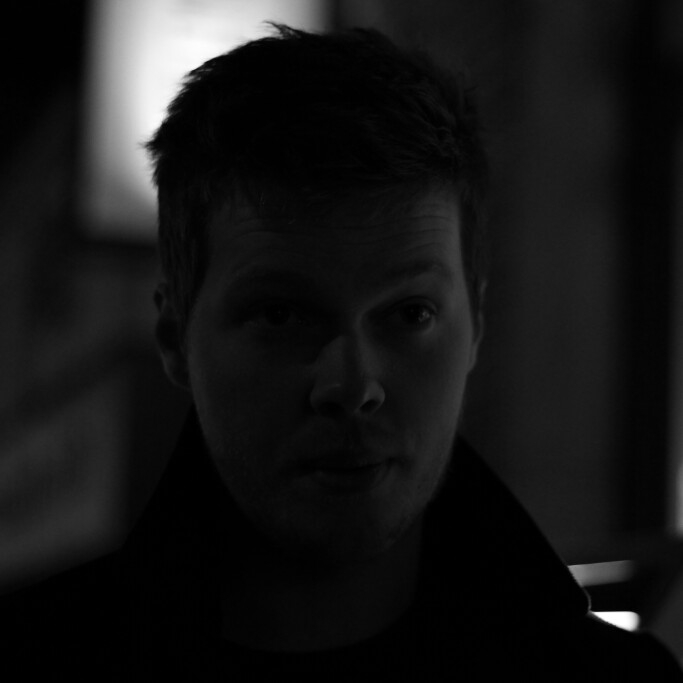

Background information
- Born: Rory Hall; 15 November 1994 (age 31)
- Genres: Electronic; Experimental; Alternative R&B; dance-pop; Minimal; Industrial; neo-soul; Ambient; art pop; avant-garde pop; House
- Occupations: Singer-songwriter, record producer, radio presenter
- Years active: 2015–present
- Labels: Strange Brew

Rory Hall (born 1994) is an Irish singer/songwriter, electronic music producer and radio presenter best known under the alias Proper Micro NV.

== Biography ==
=== 2015–2017: First, Second & Third EP ===
Hall was signed by German record label plasmapool in 2015 and his debut singles 'Closure' and 'We Must Go Now' were released in late 2015 and early 2016 respectively to positive reviews following on from mainly focusing on uploading snippets and soundscapes to SoundCloud. On the day of his second single's release DanceTop40.com named it as one of the hottest tracks of January 2016. It peaked at number 18 in the Irish Dance Charts.

In May 2016, Hall announced the news of his debut EP titled 'EP1' – a two track collective that was released on Plasmapool records on 23 June 2016. On 10 June 2016, Irish music website 'The Point of everything' reviewed the first single off the EP 'Revive'.

The track 'Revive' received its first play on Dublin's 98FM on 12 June 2016. On 22 June 2016, Irish blogger Nialler9 reviewed the first single off the EP 'Revive'.

EP1 was released on 23 June 2016 and it was reviewed on 7 July 2016 by Jim Carroll of the Irish Times. Niall Byrne, also of The Irish Times, reviewed the second single taken from EP1 – 'Erase'.

In an interview with the Limerick Leader in July 2016, Hall revealed that a second Proper Micro NV EP was in the works, and would be released before the year ends. On 14 September 2016, Hall announced via his personal Facebook page that he would be releasing a second EP titled 'It's always raining'.

On 3 November 2016, Hall released 'Flaws', the first single from the new EP. The track received positive reviews. Niall Byrne of Nialler9 called it "a minimal hushed highlight" and that Flaws was a "sporadically arranged song built on soulful mantric vocals and minimal textures to support it, that is more than the sum of its parts".

The EP received generally positive reviews, with Hot Press calling it "a gorgeous blast of ambient electropop".

In April 2017, Hall announced that a six track third EP titled 'Colours' was in production. Hall was quoted to have said that the EP would be a lot more shiny than anything he's released to date. On 23 June 2017, Hall released 'Colours'. TLM reviewed the EP on 29 June 2017.

On 10 July 2017, Joe.ie chose the song 'Do What You Do' as song of the day.

Music website REMY called Colours easily one of the best Irish EP's to be released this year, in any genre whilst giving the collection a positive review.

Joe.ie dubbed Hall as a gifted force, whilst choosing Oblivious as song of the day.

In November 2017, Proper received an RTÉ Choice Music Prize long list nomination for Colours.

=== 2018–present: Debut Album ===
On 15 June 2018 after one year of recording and focusing on live performances Proper announced his return with a new single to be released through Irish label Strange Brew on 29 June 2018. With this, he announced a series of live performances including gigs at Electric Picnic, Castlepalooza, The Workmans Club, Roisin Dubh and Dolans.

Dot Dot Dot was released on 29 June 2018. Irish writer Niall Byrne of Nialler9 and The Irish Times said that "Dot Dot Dot sounds like a natural progression from Proper Micro NV's earlier material; the song is refined and mature with subtle soundscapes and airy arps yet it retains the essence of his earlier music in the warped vocoder and drum loops."

On 16 November 2018, Proper released his debut album Dormant Boy. The Last Mixed Tape praised lead single 'Eyes' calling it "an obscured electronic backdrop filled with pops and clicks melds into a vocal that searches and reaches beyond". RTÉ 2fm presenter Dan Hegarty also praised the album saying that the record was "inventive, captivating, & it has that little extra ingredient that helps it stand out from everything else". The album entered the Irish Album Chart at number 31 and was included in Nialler9's Top 20 Albums of The Year, REMY's Top 20 Albums of the Year and was voted in at number 7 in The Last Mixed Tape's Readers Top 20 Albums of The Year.

Hall was nominated for a Hot Press Award in the Best Dance/Electronic category in February 2019. In March 2019, Hall created a new Irish music showcase titled "Limerick City ALL IN".

=== Live shows ===
In late 2016, Hall announced that plans were in place to create a live show. On 22 March 2017, Proper Micro NV along with his live band, performed at Nialler9's Future Proof in Bello, Dublin.

During 2017, Hall played Body & Soul festival, The Grand Social in Dublin and supported British band 'Pumarosa' at the Workmans Club (also in Dublin).

In early 2018, Hall was announced as one of 50 acts to play Whelan's Ones to Watch Festival 2018, and played on 18 January. This was followed by performances at Electric Picnic, Whelans, Roisin Dubh, The Workmans Club and Castlepalooza.

In 2019, Hall began a tour which included shows at Body&Soul and at Latitude Festival.

=== Radio ===
Hall has been a presenter with Clare FM and previously also worked for iRadio and Spin South West.

== Albums ==
=== Studio albums ===
List of albums, with selected chart positions, showing year released and album name
Title	Year	Peak chart positions							
Title	Year	Ireland	Irish Dance Charts	UK	Germany	Poland	Belgium	Ukraine	France
Dormant Boy	2018	31	2	–	-	–	–	-	–
"—" denotes a recording has not been released yet.

== Extended plays ==
List of extended plays, with selected details
Title	Album details
EP1	Released: 23 June 2016 (Worldwide); Label: Plasmapool; Genre: Electronic, Ambient, Minimal, Soul
It's always raining	Released: 7 December 2016 (Worldwide); Label(s): Plasmapool, Raise Recordings, PlasmaUS; Genre: Electronic, Experimental, Minimal, Dance
Colours	Released: 23 June 2017 (Worldwide); Label(s): Plasmapool, Suicide Robot, PlasmaUS; Genre: Electronic, Experimental, Minimal, Dance, Ambient

== Singles ==
List of singles, with selected chart positions, showing year released and album name
Title	Year	Peak chart positions								Album
Title	Year	Ireland	Irish Dance Charts	UK	Germany	Poland	Belgium	Ukraine	France	Album
"We Must Go Now"	2016	91	18	–	-	–	–	-	–	Non album single
"—" denotes a recording has not been released yet.

== Honours ==
Nomination for "Best Dance/Electronic" – Hot Press Award 2019
