= Dolenec =

Dolenec is a surname. Notable people with the surname include:

- Danijela Dolenec (born 1977), Croatian politician
- Jure Dolenec (born 1988), Slovene handball player

== See also ==
- Dolenc, an alternative form
- Dolenz, a respelling
