= Doolan =

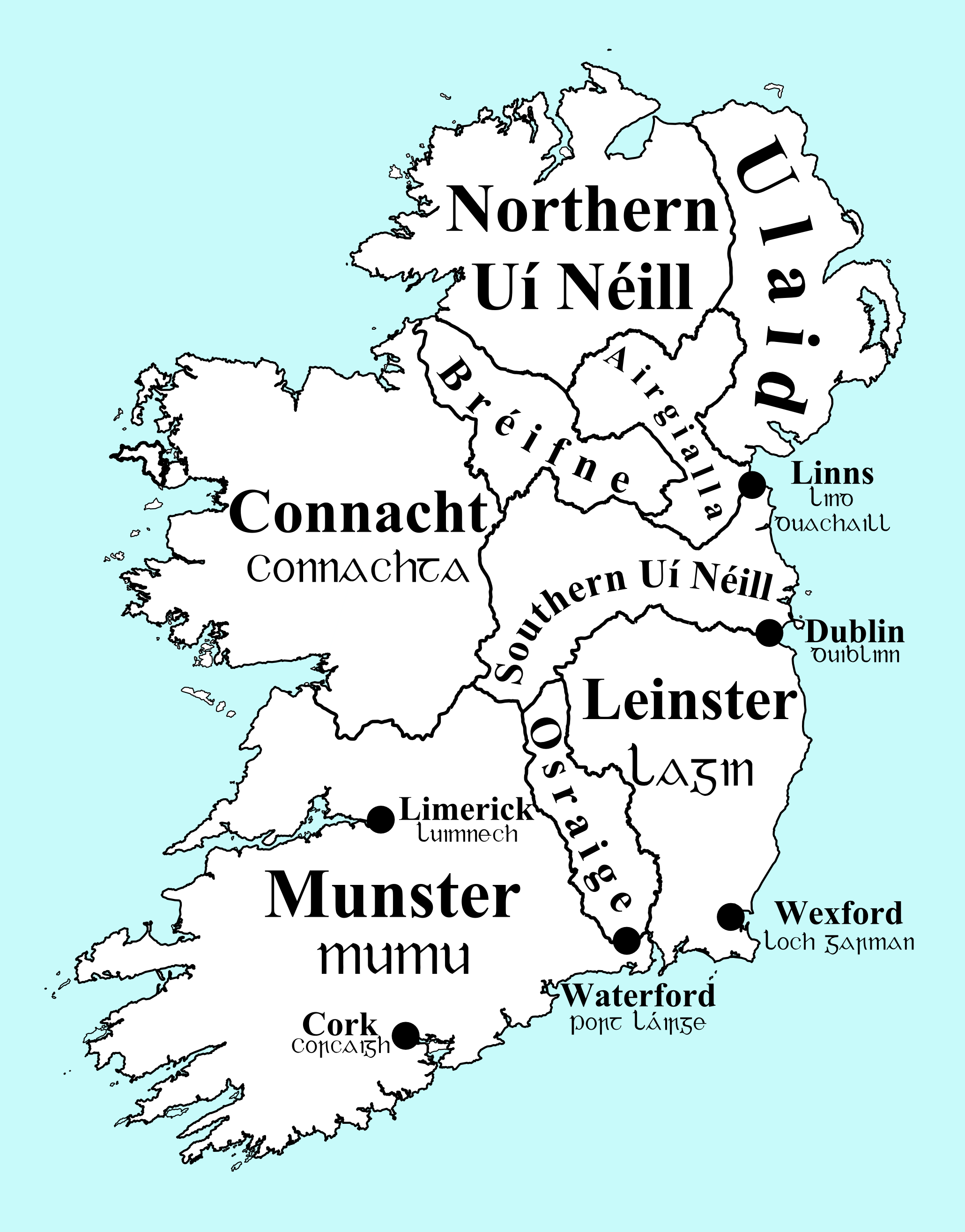
Map of medieval Gaelic Ireland showing the location of Ulaid circa 900 A.D.

Doolan (Irish: Ó Duibhleachain) is a surname of Irish origin. They were chiefs of the Clan Breasail Mac Duileachain in the Ulaid sub-kingdom of Dál Fiatach, specifically located in what became the barony of Castlereagh.

Notable people so named include:

- Alex Doolan (born 1985), Australian cricketer
- Ben Doolan (born 1973), former Australian rules footballer
- Billy Doolan (born 1952), Australian Indigenous artist
- Bruce Doolan (born 1947), Australian former cricketer
- Daithí Doolan (born 1968), Irish Sinn Féin politician
- Debra Doolan Richardson (1958-2006), Canadian murdered by her own teenage daughter and her boyfriend
- Ed Doolan (1941–2018), Australian-born naturalised British radio presenter
- Jack Doolan (American football) (1919-2002), American National Football League running back
- Jack Doolan (politician) (1927–1995), Australian politician
- Jim Doolan (1929/30–2025), Irish politician and academic
- John Doolan (footballer, born 1968), English football coach and former player
- John Doolan (footballer, born 1974), English football coach and former player
- Ken Doolan (born 1939), Australian rear admiral
- Kevin Doolan (born 1980), Australian motorcycle speedway rider
- Kris Doolan (born 1986), Scottish footballer
- Neil Doolan (1933–2012), former Australian rules footballer
- Peter Doolan (born 1940), Irish former hurler
- Ralph Doolan (1933–2018), American politician
- Vin Doolan (born 1952), former Australian rules footballer
- Wendy Doolan (born 1968), Australian former golfer

== See also ==
- Dolan (disambiguation)
- Doolin (surname)
- Doolin (Irish: Dúlainn), a coastal village in County Clare, Ireland
