= Noah Star Navigation Premium: Akitoshi Saito Road Last =

2024 Pro Wrestling Noah event

NOAH Star Navigation Premium: Akitoshi Saito Road Last
- Promotional poster of the event featuring Kaito Kiyomiya and Masa Kitamiya
- Promotion: CyberFight
- Brand: Pro Wrestling Noah
- Date: October 14, 2024
- City: Tokyo, Japan
- Venue: Korakuen Hall
- Attendance: 1,302

Pay-per-view chronology
← Previous; Star Navigation in Tokyo 2024	Next → Deathnity

Star Navigation chronology
← Previous; Star Navigation in Tokyo 2024	Next → Star Navigation Premium 2025

Noah Star Navigation Premium: Akitoshi Saito Road Last was a professional wrestling event promoted by CyberFight's sub-brand Pro Wrestling Noah and took place on October 14, 2024, in Tokyo, Japan, at the Nippon Budokan. Broadcasting was made on CyberAgent's AbemaTV online linear television service and CyberFight's streaming service Wrestle Universe. The event featured Akitoshi Saito's last match in the Korakuen Hall.

Nine matches were contested at the event, and three of Noah's six championships were on the line. The main event saw Kaito Kiyomiya defeat Masa Kitamiya to retain the GHC Heavyweight Championship.

== Background ==
=== Storylines ===
The event featured professional wrestling matches that resulted from scripted storylines, where wrestlers portrayed villains, heroes, or less distinguishable characters in the scripted events that built tension and culminated in a wrestling match or series of matches.

=== Event ===
The event started with three preshow bouts broadcast live on Noah's YouTube channel. In the first match, one half of the GHC Junior Heavyweight Tag Team Champions Hayata defeated Daiki Odashima in singles competition. In the second one, Eita and Shuhei Taniguchi picked up a win over Alpha Wolf and Galeno del Mal in tag team competition. In the third preshow bout, Junta Miyawaki, Kai Fujimura, Tadasuke and Yu Owada defeated Amakusa, Dragon Bane, Yo-Hey and Yuto Kikuchi in eight-man tag team action.

In the first main card bout, GHC Junior Heavyweight Champion Daga and Jack Morris outmatched Anthony Greene and LJ Cleary in tag team competition. Next up, Naomichi Marufuji and Takashi Sugiura defeated Kenoh and Alejandro to secure the third consecutive defense of the GHC Tag Team Championship in that respective reign. Next up, Masakatsu Funaki and Kazuyuki Fujita defeated Josh Barnett and Ulka Sasaki in tag team action. After the bout concluded, WWE's Shinsuke Nakamura reached out via video to announce his return to Noah at Noah The New Year 2025 on January 1, where he was scheduled to face Sasaki himself. In the seventh bout, Manabu Soya defeated El Hijo de Dr. Wagner Jr. to secure the first defense of the GHC National Championship in that respective reign. In the semi main event, Akitoshi Saito, Shiro Koshinaka and Akira defeated Go Shiozaki, Mohammed Yone and Atsushi Kotoge. As the name of the pay-per-view hinted, this was Saito's last match in the Korakuen Hall as part of his retirement road series of events.

In the main event, Kaito Kiyomiya defeated Masa Kitamiya to secure the fifth consecutive defense of the GHC Heavyweight Championship in that respective reign. After the bout concluded, Kiyomiya received a challenge from both Naomichi Marufuji and Takashi Sugiura, with the winner between the two of them later being scheduled to face Kiyomiya at Noah Deathnity on November 17, 2024.

== Results ==
No.	Results	Stipulations	Times
1	Hayata defeated Daiki Odashima	Singles match	5:30
2	Eita and Shuhei Taniguchi defeated Alpha Wolf and Galeno del Mal	Tag team match	6:17
3	Junta Miyawaki, Kai Fujimura, Tadasuke and Yu Owada defeated Amakusa, Dragon Bane and Ratel's (Yo-Hey and Yuto Kikuchi)	Eight-man tag team match	5:00
4	Team 2000X (Daga and Jack Morris) defeated Anthony Greene and LJ Cleary	Tag team match	5:56
5	Naomichi Marufuji and Takashi Sugiura (c) defeated All Rebellion (Kenoh and Alejandro)	Tag team match for the GHC Tag Team Championship	13:08
6	Masakatsu Funaki and Kazuyuki Fujita defeated Josh Barnett and Ulka Sasaki	Tag team match	14:26
7	Manabu Soya (c) defeated El Hijo de Dr. Wagner Jr.	Singles match for the GHC National Championship	11:30
8	Akitoshi Saito, Shiro Koshinaka and Akira defeated Team NOAH (Go Shiozaki, Mohammed Yone and Atsushi Kotoge)	Six-man tag team match	15:20
9	Kaito Kiyomiya (c) defeated Masa Kitamiya	Singles match for the GHC Heavyweight Championship	22:33
(c) / – the champion(s) heading into the match
