= Dolin =

Dolin (feminine: Dolina) is a Slavic-language surname. Notable people with the surname include:

- Anton Dolin (ballet dancer) (1904–1983), English ballet dancer and choreographer
- Anton Dolin (film critic) (born 1976), Russian film critic and journalist
- Eric Jay Dolin (born 1961), American author of history books, often focused on maritime topics and wildlife
- Gigi Dolin (born 1997), American professional wrestler
- Gregory Dolin (fl. 2000s–2020s), Associate Justice of the Supreme Court of Palau
- Larisa Dolina (born 1955), Russian singer and actress
- Mariya Dolina (1922–2010), Soviet dive bomber pilot
- Marty Dolin (1939–2018), Canadian politician in Manitoba, husband of Mary Beth
- Mary Beth Dolin (1936–1985), Canadian politician in Manitoba, wife of Marty
- Samuel Dolin (1917–2002), Canadian composer, music educator, and arts administrator
- Sharon Dolin (born 1956), American author, entrepreneur, and community activist
- Veronika Dolina (born 1956), Russian poet, bard, and songwriter
- Vladimir Dolin (1983–2009), Russian serial killer

== See also ==
- Dolan (disambiguation)
- Dolen (disambiguation)
- Dolina (disambiguation)
