= Dollens =

Dollens is a surname. Notable people with the surname include:

- Mickey Dollens (born 1987), American politician, nonprofit executive, author, and educator
- Morris Scott Dollens (1920–1994), American artist and science fiction writer

== See also ==
- Dolenz
