= Joseph Dolan =

Joseph Dolan may refer to:

- Joe Dolan (1939–2007), Irish entertainer, recorder and singer of easy listening songs.
- "Galway Joe" Dolan (1942–2008), Irish musician, songwriter and artist
- Joe Dolan (footballer) (born 1980), English footballer
- Joe Dolan (baseball) (1873–1938), American professional baseball player

== See also ==
- Dolan (disambiguation)
