= Dolan =

Dolan may refer to:

== People ==
- Dolan (surname), a surname
- Dolan people, Xinjiang, China
- The Dolans, an American husband and wife who hosted financial advice shows on radio and television

== Places in the United States ==
- Dolan, Indiana
- Dolan Springs, Arizona
- Dolan Township, Cass County, Missouri

== Fiction ==
- Ellen Dolan (character), a character from The Spirit, created by Will Eisner

== Other uses ==
- Dolan Bikes, a British bicycle manufacturer
- Dolan Fire, a 2020 California wildfire
- Dolan Peak, a rock peak in the Quartz Hills, Antarctica
- Dolan v. City of Tigard, a Supreme Court case in the United States
- Dolan v. United States, a Supreme Court case in the United States
- Dolans, a music venue and pub in Limerick, Ireland
- Dolan, trade name of Orphenadrine

== See also ==
- Doolan, a surname
- Dolen (disambiguation)
- Dolin (disambiguation)
