= Over the Top Wrestling =

Irish professional wrestling promotion

- Industry: Professional wrestling
- Founded: 2014; 12 years ago
- Founder: Joe Cabray
- Headquarters: Dublin, Ireland
- Area served: Western Europe
- Products: Live events; merchandise; video on demand
- Website: ottwrestling.com

Over the Top Wrestling (OTT) is an Irish professional wrestling promotion founded by Joe Cabray and Leonard Hanna in 2014. It is headquartered in Dublin and opened a UK base in Wolverhampton in 2022, in addition to hosting events throughout Ireland, the UK, Italy, and Spain.

Shows originally took place in Dublin's Tivoli Theatre until its closure in 2019. Events now take place at The National Stadium in Dublin, the Europa Hotel in Belfast, or The Hangar in Wolverhampton. OTT also hosts shows in areas of Ireland such as Derry, Enniskillen, Limerick, and Wexford. Special "Supershows" periodically occur at Dublin's National Stadium, where shows featuring up-and-coming local talent are also hosted at the venue's Ringside Club.

Known for mixing traditional wrestling with elements of sports entertainment, OTT primarily showcases local wrestlers but has also garnered a reputation for featuring famous wrestlers from all over the world such as The Young Bucks, Mick Foley, Drew McIntyre, Jon Moxley, Kenny Omega, Will Ospreay, Gunther, and Cody Rhodes.

== History ==
=== 2010s ===
Founded by Irish wrestler Joe Cabray in 2014 as an alternative to the more family-friendly offerings on the Irish professional wrestling scene at the time, OTT was aimed at an adult audience. Shows initially focused mainly on Irish talent, with gimmicks based on Irish culture such as the Traveller-influenced Luther Ward (portrayed by Cabray) and his stable the Ward Family, Session Moth Martina, the working-class Lads from the Flats, and the elitist "Lord of the Manor" Paul Tracey. The shows were at first composed of wrestlers trained by Main Stage Wrestling and Fight Factory Pro Wrestling; as the promotion evolved, it began featuring famous wrestlers from all over the world such as The Young Bucks, Mick Foley, Drew McIntyre, Jon Moxley, Kenny Omega, Will Ospreay, and Cody Rhodes.

=== 2020s ===
After 17 months without a show due to the COVID-19 pandemic, OTT returned in Belfast on 18 July 2021 with "Welcome Back to the Second Half". The show featured predominantly Irish mainstays from the pre-pandemic OTT era as well as a number of imports based in the UK such as Omari, Emersyn Jayne, Jamie Hayter and Mark Haskins. This show saw the unification of the GN Title held by Adam Maxted and the vacated OTT World Title in a match won by Mark Haskins to become double champion. A Tag tournament eliminator was also held due to Moustache Mountain vacating their titles . The tournament finals saw The Kings of The North (Bonesaw & Damien Corvin) beat The Lads From the Flats (Paddy M & Session Moth Martina) win to the belts for the fourth time.

The following shows saw the promotion of a number of the contenders roster including Justin Daniels, and Danny Cross (simply known as "Jay") who won the OTT Tag Team Titles with B.Cool on his main roster. Liamo also became a regular on the shows as a manager for Paddy M and Martina, and later made his in-ring debut on Contenders 18, the first such show in the post-pandemic era. This card also introduced Fabio to OTT. Sammy D defeated Scotty Davis for the OTT No Limits Title at the 2021 Wexford Spiegeltent Festival live event, becoming the first unrecorded title change in company history.

In 2022, OTT announced that it had expanded operations into the UK with a second base in Wolverhampton, where shows take place at The Hangar. The rest of the year saw a double header of Saturday and Sunday shows "OTT Live at the Ringside". Early in the year, Terry Thatcher turned heel after being unable to beat Session Moth Martina for the GN Championship. He also headed up his own stable called The DeThatchment. Mark Haskins was unable to make The Road to Scrappermania show in Dublin due to travel issues, as a result an impromptu main event was made for the OTT Tag Team Championships which saw Aussie Open overcome B.Cool and Jay to win the titles for the first time. This show also set up a number of matches for the Scrappermania 6 stadium show.

On St. Patrick's Day Weekend 2023, three titles changed hands on three consecutive nights in three different cities. Wolverhampton saw its first championship switch when local wrestler Trent Seven captured the OTT No Limits Championship. The next night in Dublin, Sammy D won the OTT World Championship in the main event of ScrapperMania VII. The Kings of the North then began their record fifth reign as OTT Tag Team Champions in Belfast the next day. Towards the end of 2023, OTT held an event in Milan, marking its first show outside of Ireland and the UK. The following months saw a soft relaunch of OTT in Dublin as they took up residence in The Complex, a venue in Dublin's city centre for their first show in the capital city since the Tivoli days. At this event dubbed "Poetry Slam", a returning Omari overcame Mark Haskins to become the OTT World Champion. The following months saw the retirement of B Cool in a career v title match against Sammy D, The formation of "The Draw" (Sammy D, Charlie Sterling and Adam Maxted) and a heel turn by babyface Jay to join the Draw. 2022 ended with the Draw holding the Tag Team Titles, NLW & GN Championships.

In 2024, OTT co-promoted shows with Resist Pro Wrestling in Barcelona, with a new European Championship being created to reflect this expansion into continental Europe. OTT instituted a new show concept in 2024 with a match called Rumble Loco, based on WWE's Royal Rumble, whereby the winner of a battle royal would go on to challenge for the OTT World Championship at the company's flagship show ScrapperMania. For the Tenth Anniversary Show in October 2024, OTT featured reigning WWE World Tag Team Champions Finn Balor and JD McDonagh, which included a WWE produced vignette from the entire Judgement Day faction.

In March 2026, Over The Top Wrestling linked up with Progress Wrestling to host a first round match up in the prestigious Super Strong Style 16 Tournament. In October 2026, the company cross promoted with German Wrestling Federation at Double Impact in Berlin.

== Championships ==
Championship	Current champion(s)	Reign	Date won	Days held	Location	Notes
OTT World Championship	Renzo Rose	1	16 August 2026	92	Belfast, Northern Ireland	Defeated Big Damo at OTT Summer Bash.
OTT No Limits Championship	Goldenboy Santos	1	6 September 2026	71	Dublin, Ireland	Defeated Calum Black at Who’s The Daddy:Season Finale.
OTT Tag Team Championship	Cian Noonan & Luke Frehill	1	14 June 2026	155	Belfast, Northern Ireland	Defeated BDE at Dead On.
OTT Women's Championship	Raven Creed	4	24 October 2026	29	Dublin, Ireland	Defeated Storm at NEWEND.
OTT European Championship	Jay	1	23 July 2026	116	Dublin, Ireland	Defeated Trent Seven at OTT After Dark.
OTT Gender Neutral Championship	The Weirdos (Kat Von Kay, Frankie Vendetta and The Sem)	2	16 August 2026	92	Belfast, Northern Ireland	Kat Von Kay defeated Session Moth Martina at a ringside bar using 24/7 rule at OTT Summer Bash.
OTT Irish Heavyweight Championship	Renzo Rose	1	20 June 2026	149	Wexford, Ireland	Defeated Cian Noonan at OTT Summer Bash Tour: Wexford.

== OTT World Championship ==
The OTT World Championship is the premier title in Over The Top Wrestling. The current champion is Renzo Rose, who is in his first reign. He won the title by defeating Big Damo at OTT Summer Bash on 16 August 2026 in Belfast, Northern Ireland.

OTT World Championship

Details
- Promotion: Over the Top Wrestling
- Date established: 3 February 2018
- Current champion: Renzo Rose
- Date won: 16 August 2026
Statistics
- First champion: Jordan Devlin
- Most reigns: Jordan Devlin (2 reigns)
- Longest reign: Mark Haskins (368 days)
- Shortest reign: Big Damo (735 days)
- Oldest champion: Trent Seven (42 years old)
- Youngest champion: Jordan Devlin (27 years old)
- Heaviest champion: Big Damo (322 lbs)
- Lightest champion: Jordan Devlin (183 lbs)

=== Reigns ===
Key
No.	Overall reign number
Reign	Reign number for the specific champion
Days	Number of days held
Defenses	Number of successful defenses
+	Current reign is changing daily

No.	Champion	Championship change			Reign statistics			Notes	Ref.
No.	Champion	Date	Event	Location	Reign	Days	Defenses	Notes	Ref.
1	Jordan Devlin	3 February 2018	Homecoming - Dublin	Dublin, Ireland	1	196	4	Reigning NLW Champion Jordan Devlin defeated Timothy Thatcher and was declared the first OTT Champion. He immediately vacated the NLW Championship.	
2	Walter	18 August 2018	Wrestlerama II	Dublin, Ireland	1	210	2		
3	Jordan Devlin	16 March 2019	OTT Scrappermania V	Dublin, Ireland	2	224	3		
4	David Starr	26 October 2019	OTT Fifth Year Anniversary	Dublin, Ireland	1	236	3		
—	Vacated	18 June 2020	—	—	—	—	—	Stripped due to sexual assault allegations against Starr.	
5	Mark Haskins	18 July 2021	Welcome Back To The Second Half	Belfast, Northern Ireland	1	368	8	This match was also for Adam Maxted's OTT Gender Neutral Championship.	
6	Omari	22 July 2022	Poetry Slam	Dublin, Ireland	1	239	13		
7	Sammy D	18 March 2023	OTT ScrapperMania VII: Night 2	Dublin, Ireland	1	350	10		
8	Trent Seven	2 March 2024	OTT Gaff Party	Dublin, Ireland	2	161	2		
9	B. Cool	10 August 2024	OTT ScrapperMania VIII: Night 2	Dublin, Ireland	1	1	0		
—	Vacated	11 August 2024	OTT Aftermath	—	—	—	—	B. Cool vacated the title due to injury.	
10	Big Damo	11 August 2024	OTT Aftermath	Belfast, Northern Ireland	1	735	22	Defeated Trent Seven and Man Like DeReiss to win the vacant title.	
11	Renzo Rose	16 August 2026	OTT Summer Bash	Belfast, Northern Ireland	1	92+	5		

=== Combined reigns ===
Indicates current champion

Rank	Wrestler	No. of reigns	Combined defenses	Combined days
1	Big Damo	1	22	735
2	Jordan Devlin	2	7	420
3	Mark Haskins	1	8	368
4	Sammy D	1	10	350
5	Omari	1	13	239
6	David Starr	1	3	236
7	Walter	1	2	210
8	Trent Seven	1	2	161
9	Renzo Rose	1	5	92+
10	B. Cool	1	0	1

== OTT No Limits Championship ==
The OTT No Limits Wrestling Championship, sometimes simply known as the NLW Championship, is a title in Over the Top Wrestling. The championship predates Over The Top Wrestling and was competed for across various promotions in Europe. Within OTT, it was initially used as the top tier title in the company, until the introduction of the OTT World Championship. It now serves as the company's secondary championship.

The current champion is Goldenboy Santos, who is in his first reign as champion. He won the title by defeating Calum Black at Who’s The Daddy:Season Finale Dublin, Ireland on 6 September 2026.

OTT No Limits Championship

Details
- Promotion: Over the Top Wrestling
- Date established: 4 March 2007
- Current champion: Goldenboy Santos
- Date won: 6 September 2026

Other names
- NLW Heavyweight Championship (2007 - 2009); AWR No Limits Championship (2009 - 2014); NLW Heavyweight Championship (2014 - 2015); OTT No Limits Wrestling Championship (2015 - present)
Statistics
- First champion: Dunkan Disorderly
- Most reigns: Dunkan Disorderly (4 reigns)
- Longest reign: Scotty Davis (756 days)
- Shortest reign: LJ Cleary (1 day)

=== Reigns ===
Key
No.	Overall reign number
Reign	Reign number for the specific champion
Days	Number of days held
Defenses	Number of successful defenses
+	Current reign is changing daily

No.	Champion	Championship change			Reign statistics			Notes	Ref.
No.	Champion	Date	Event	Location	Reign	Days	Defenses	Notes	Ref.
1	Dunkan Disorderly	4 March 2007	NLW Crowning Of A Champion	Dublin, Ireland	1	322	2	Disorderly defeated Anthony Idol, Georgie Mac and Joey Cabray in a 4 way match to become the inaugural champion	
2	Sean Brennan	20 January 2008	NLW	Naas, Ireland	1	56	2	This was a three way match also involving Anthony Idol	
3	Heidenreich	16 March 2008	AWR Rampage Tour 2008	Castlebar, Ireland	1	27	4	This was a three way match also involving Shaka	
4	Sean Brennan	12 April 2008	NLW 2nd Anniversary Show	Naas, Ireland	2	340	6		
5	Rob Van Dam	18 March 2009	AWR European Tour 2009 - Day 1	Paris, France	1	6	3→	This was a three way match also involving Sabu	
6	Rene Dupree	24 March 2009	AWR European Tour 2009 - Day 5	Bordeaux, France	1	2	0		
—	Vacated	26 March 2009	—	—	—	—	—		
7	Dunkan Disorderly	31 August 2009	AWR Summer Bash Tour 2009 - Day 6	Belfast, Northern Ireland	2	88	4	This was 3 way match with Sean Brennan and Paddy Morrow	
8	Michael Knight	27 November 2009	AWR European Invasion 2009 - Day 7	Regensburg, Germany	1	2	1		
9	PAC	29 November 2009	AWR European Invasion 2009 - Day 9	Oberhausen, Germany	1	9	2	This was a three way match also involving El Generico	
10	Dunkan Disorderly	8 December 2009	AWR European Invasion 2009 - Day 12	Toulouse, France	3	337	5	This was a three way match also involving El Generico	
11	Daivari	10 November 2010	AWR Twisted Steel Tour - Day 1	Bordeaux, France	1	11	1		
12	Shawn Brennan	21 November 2010	AWR Twisted Steel Tour - Day 7	Rouen, France	3	63	0		
13	Paul Tracey	23 January 2011	NLW New Year′s Bash	Naas, Ireland	1	245	9		
14	Dunkan Disorderly	25 September 2011	NLW 5th Anniversary Show	Naas, Ireland	4	119	1		
15	Paddy Morrow	22 January 2012	NLW New Year′s Bash	Naas, Ireland	1	369	2		
16	Paul Tracey	25 January 2013	FFPW	Bray, Ireland	2	2	0		
17	Danny Butler	27 January 2013	NLW New Year′s Bash	Naas, Ireland	1	534	2		
18	Luther Ward	15 July 2014	FFPW	Dublin, Ireland	1	221	2		
19	Paul Tracey	21 February 2015	Humperdink And The Monster Factory	Dublin, Ireland	3	190	3		
20	Pete Dunne	30 August 2015	Too Cool	Dublin, Ireland	1	209	6		
21	Luther Ward	26 March 2016	Scrappermania II - The Rising	Dublin, Ireland	2	168	2		
22	Pete Dunne	10 September 2016	Wrestling Is Art	Dublin, Ireland	2	147	1		
23	Ryan Smile	4 February 2017	Martina's Gaff Party 2: Back In The Dr. Dre - Dublin	Dublin, Ireland	1	182	3		
24	Mark Haskins	5 August 2017	WrestleRama - Dublin	Dublin, Ireland	1	126	4	This was a three way elimination match also involving Marty Scurll	
25	Jordan Devlin	9 December 2017	Being The Elite	Dublin, Ireland	1	56	2		
—	Vacated	3 February 2018	Homecoming	Dublin, Ireland	—	—	—	Devlin vacated the title when he was awarded the OTT Championship	
26	Terry Thatcher	13 May 2018	Contenders 9	Dublin, Ireland	1	154	1	Defeated Scotty Davis in a tournament final	
27	Curtis Murray	14 October 2018	Defiant 2	Dublin, Ireland	1	350	2		
28	Scotty Davis	29 September 2019	Martina's Gaff Party 4	Belfast, Northern Ireland	1	756	3	This was a three way elimination match also involving Calum Black	
29	Sammy D	24 October 2021	Spiegeltent Festival 2021	Wexford, Ireland	1	509	14		
30	Trent Seven	17 March 2023	ScrapperMania VII	Wolverhampton, England	1	119	3		
31	LJ Cleary	15 July 2023	The Draw - Dublin	Dublin, Ireland	1	1	1		
32	Trent Seven	16 July 2023	The Draw - Belfast	Belfast, Northern Ireland	2	112	2		
33	Renzo Rose	4 November 2023	Showdown in Milan	Milan, Italy	1	280	10		
34	Danhausen	10 August 2024	OTT ScrapperMania VIII: Night 2	Dublin, Ireland	1	1	0		
35	The Sem	11 August 2024	OTT Aftermath	Belfast, Northern Ireland	1	132	2	This was a five-way scramble, also involving Dan Barry, Renzo Rose and Session Moth Martina.	
36	Jay	21 December 2024	The Dream Before Christmas	Dublin, Ireland	1	294	8	This was a Gauntlet match also involving CBL, Charles Crowley and Nathan Black .	
37	Calum Black	11 December 2025	Invasion	Drogheda, Ireland	1	330	18		
38	Goldenboy Santos	6 September 2026	Who’s The Daddy:Season Finale	Dublin, Ireland	1	71+	0		

=== Combined reigns ===
Indicates the current champion

Rank	Wrestler	No. of reigns	Combined defenses	Combined days
1	Dunkan Disorderly	4	12	866
2	Scotty Davis	1	3	756
3	Danny Butler	1	2	534
4	Sammy D	1	14	567
5	Sean Guinness	3	8	459
6	Paul Tracey	3	12	437
7	Luther Ward	2	4	389
8	Paddy Morrow	1	2	369
9	Pete Dunne	2	7	356
10	Curtis Murray	1	2	350
11	Calum Black	1	18	330
12	Jay	1	7	294
13	Renzo Rose	1	10	280
14	Trent Seven	2	5	232
15	Ryan Smile	1	3	182
16	Terry Thatcher	1	1	154
17	The Sem	1	2	132
18	Mark Haskins	1	4	126
29	Goldenboy Santos	1	0	71+
20	Jordan Devlin	1	2	56
21	Heidenreich	1	4	27
22	Shawn Daivari	1	1	11
23	PAC	1	2	9
24	Rob Van Dam	1	3	6
25	Rene Dupree	1	0	2
25	Michael Knight	1	1	2
26	Danhausen	1	0	1
26	LJ Cleary	1	0	1

== OTT Tag Team Championship ==
The OTT Tag Team Championship is a title in Over the Top Wrestling primarily contested for by tag teams is also defended by three-man teams using the Freebird Rule. The current champions are Sculpted Cian Noonan & Chainsaw Luke Frehill who are in their first reign. Noonan & Frehill defeated BDE after co-cashing in Noonan’s OTT Golden Opportunity Briefcase Dead On on 14 June 2026 in Belfast, Northern Ireland.

=== Reigns ===
Key
No.	Overall reign number
Reign	Reign number for the specific team—reign numbers for the individuals are in parentheses, if different
Days	Number of days held
Defenses	Number of successful defenses
+	Current reign is changing daily

No.	Champion	Championship change			Reign statistics			Notes	Ref.
No.	Champion	Date	Event	Location	Reign	Days	Defenses	Notes	Ref.
1	The Kings Of The North (Bonesaw and Damien Corvin)	25 July 2015	Respect My Authority	Dublin, Ireland	1	308	3	Bonesaw and Corvin won a four way elimination match also involving The Gymnasties, The Lads From The Flats and The Wards to become the inaugural champions	
2	The Gymnasties (B. Cool and Sammy D)	28 May 2016	Even Better Than Better Than Our Best	Dublin, Ireland	1	203	2		
3	The Kings Of The North (Bonesaw (2), Damien Corvin (2) and Dunkan Disorderly)	17 December 2016	The Dream Before Christmas	Dublin, Ireland	2	414	8	Defended titles under Freebird Rule	
4	The Rapture (Charlie Sterling, Sha Samuels and Zack Gibson)	3 February 2018	Homecoming - Dublin	Dublin, Ireland	1	120	3	This was a steel cage match. Defended titles under Freebird Rule.	
5	The Kings Of The North (Bonesaw(3), Damien Corvin(3) and Dunkan Disorderly(2))	3 June 2018	Live In Belfast	Belfast, Northern Ireland	3	286	6	Defended titles under Freebird Rule	
6	British Strong Style (Pete Dunne, Trent Seven and Tyler Bate)	16 March 2019	Scrappermania V	Dublin, Ireland	1	855	3	The duo of Seven and Bate, known as Moustache Mountain, would go on to defend the titles.	
—	Vacated	15 July 2021	—	—	—	—	—	Titles were announced as being vacated by Moustache Mountain prior to restart of OTT, following hiatus due to COVID-19 pandemic.	
7	The Kings Of The North (Bonesaw (4) and Damien Corvin (4))	18 July 2021	Welcome Back to the Second Half	Belfast, Northern Ireland	4	56	1	Kings of the North won a triangle tournament for the vacant championship.	
8	B. Cool and Jay	12 September 2021	Banjaxed II	Belfast, Northern Ireland	1	160	3	Danny Cross known as Jay during this reign.	
9	Aussie Open (Kyle Fletcher and Mark Davis)	19 February 2022	Road to Scrappermania	Dublin, Ireland	1	153	2		
10	VeloCities (Jude London and Paris De Silva)	22 July 2022	Poetry Slam	Dublin, Ireland	1	28	1	Won a 3 way match which also included Kings of The North	
11	The Draw (Adam Maxted and Charlie Sterling (2))	19 August 2022	Wrestling Lives Here	Dublin, Ireland	1	212	6		
12	The Kings Of The North (Damien Corvin (5), Bonesaw (5) and Dunkan Disorderly (3))	19 March 2023	The Night After Mania	Belfast, Northern Ireland	5	117	1	Titles won by Corbin and Disorderly but Bonesaw recognised under Freebird Rule	
13	B. Cool and Jay	15 July 2023	The Draw - Dublin	Dublin, Ireland	2	189	2	Defeated the duo of Bonesaw and Disorderly.	
14	The Social Elite (Sean Guinness and Matthew Smyth)	20 January 2024	Rumble Loco	Dublin, Ireland	1	469	14		
15	Sammy D & Trent Seven	3 May 2025	Reckoning	Dublin, Ireland	1	64	1		
16	Hype Dawgs (Kuro and Mecca)	6 July 2025	Summer Bash - Belfast	Belfast, Northern Ireland	1	111	2		
17	Matthew 'Bullet' Smyth and Renzo Rose (Smyth (2), Rose (1))	25 October 2025	OTT Elevnth Anniversary Show	Dublin, Ireland	1	1	0	Disbanded the day after winning the titles.	
18	Makaveli (Matthew 'Bullet' Smyth (3), Damien Corvin (6) and Calum Black	26 October 2025	OTT Elevnth Anniversary Show	Dublin, Ireland	1	231	3	The duo of Smyth and Corvin won the titles by defeating Renzo Rose and Bonesaw at OTT Super Christmas Showdown on 21 December 2025. Their reign is retroactively recognized as beginning a day after former champions Matthew Smith and Renzo Rose broke up, with Calum Black retroactively recognised as champion. Goldenboy Santos has also defended the titles for Makaveli via the Freebird Rule.	
19	BDE (Big Bad Dirty Nicky and Bittersweet Josh	14 June 2026	Dead On	Belfast, Northern Ireland	1	<1	1	Defeated the duo of Corvin and Black.	
20	Cian Noonan & Luke Frehill	14 June 2026	Dead On	Belfast, Northern Ireland	1	155+	4	Defeated BDE after Co-cashing in Noonan’s OTT Golden Opportunity Briefcase.	

=== Combined reigns ===
Indicates the current champion

Rank	Team	No. of reigns	Combined defenses	Combined days
1	The Kings of the North (Damien Corvin (5), Bonesaw (5) and Dunkan Disorderly (3) )	5	17	1,281
2	British Strong Style (Pete Dunne, Trent Seven and Tyler Bate)	1	3	855
3	Social Elite (Sean Guinness and Matthew Smyth)	1	14	469
4	B. Cool and Jay	2	5	349
5	Makaveli (Matthew Smyth, Damien Corvin and Calum Black)	1	3	231
6	The Draw (Adam Maxted and Charlie Sterling)	1	6	212
7	The Gymnasties (B. Cool and Sammy D)	1	2	203
8	Cian Noonan & Luke Frehill	1	4	155+
9	Aussie Open (Mark Davis and Kyle Fletcher)	1	2	153
10	The Rapture (Charlie Sterling, Sha Samuels and Zack Gibson)	1	3	120
11	Hype Dawgs (Kuro and Mecca)	1	2	111
12	Sammy D & Trent Seven	1	1	64
13	VeloCities (Jude London and Paris De Silva)	1	1	28
14	Matthew Smyth and Renzo Rose	1	0	1
15	BDE (Big Bad Dirty Nicky and Bitersweet Josh)	1	1	<1

=== By wrestler ===
Rank	Wrestler	No. of reigns	Successful defenses	Combined days
1	Damien Corvin	6	19	1,338
2	Bonesaw	5	18	1,163
3	Trent Seven	2	3	916
4	Pete Dunne	1	2	852
4	Tyler Bate	1	2	852
5	Dunkan Disorderly	3	11	817
6	Matthew Smyth	3	16	701
7	B. Cool	3	5	552
8	Sean Guinness	1	14	469
9	Jay	2	3	349
10	Charlie Sterling	2	6	332
11	Sammy D	2	3	267
12	Calum Black	1	3	231
13	Adam Maxted	1	3	212
14	Cian Noonan	1	4	155+
14	Luke Frehill	1	4	155+
15	Mark Davis	1	1	153
15	Kyle Fletcher	1	1	153
16	Sha Samuels	1	3	120
16	Zack Gibson	1	3	120
17	Kuro	1	2	111
17	Mecca	1	2	111
18	Jude London	1	1	28
18	Paris De Silva	1	1	28
19	Renzo Rose	1	0	1
20	Big Bad Dirty Nicky	1	1	<1
20	Bittersweet Josh	1	1	<1

== OTT Women's Championship ==
The OTT Women's Championship is a title in Over the Wrestling and is competed for by female talent. The current champion is Raven Creed, who is in her fourth reign.

=== Reigns ===
Key
No.	Overall reign number
Reign	Reign number for the specific champion
Days	Number of days held
Defenses	Number of successful defenses
<1	Reign lasted less than a day
+	Current reign is changing daily

No.	Champion	Championship change			Reign statistics			Notes	Ref.
No.	Champion	Date	Event	Location	Reign	Days	Defenses	Notes	Ref.
1	Session Moth Martina	29 October 2016	Wrestlecon - Night II	Dublin, Ireland	1	50	1	Defeated Katey Harvey in a tournament final to become inaugural champion	
2	Katey Harvey	18 December 2016	Christmas Invasion Belfast	Belfast, Northern Ireland	1	230	2	This was a three way elimination match which also involved Kay Lee Ray.	
3	Session Moth Martina	8 August 2017	WrestleRama	Dublin, Ireland	2	236	3		
4	Emersyn Jayne	1 April 2018	Defiant	Dublin, Ireland	1	196	2	This was a four way match which also involving Katey Harvey and Raven Creed.	
5	Raven Creed	14 October 2018	Defiant II	Dublin, Ireland	1	224	4		
6	Valkyrie	26 May 2019	Live In Belfast: Banjaxed	Belfast, Northern Ireland	1	153	2		
7	Katey Harvey	26 October 2019	Fifth Year Anniversary	Dublin, Ireland	2	71	1		
8	Emersyn Jayne	5 January 2020	Stickin' Out	Belfast, Northern Ireland	2	797	3		
9	Debbie Keitel	12 March 2022	ScrapperMania VI	Dublin, Ireland	1	371	6		
10	Session Moth Martina	18 March 2023	ScrapperMania VII	Dublin, Ireland	3	588	7		
11	Raven Creed	26 October 2024	OTT Tenth Anniversary	Dublin, Ireland	2	364	5	This was a Tables match	
12	Myla Grace	25 October 2025	OTT Eleventh Anniversary	Dublin, Ireland	1	232	10		
13	Raven Creed	14 June 2026	Dead On	Belfast, Northern Ireland	3	126	5		
14	Nikki Storm	18 October 2026	Pure Deadly	Belfast, Northern Ireland	1	6	1		
14	Raven Creed	24 October 2026	NEWEND	Dublin, Ireland	4	23+	1		

=== Combined reigns ===
Indicates the current champion

Rank	Wrestler	No. of reigns	Combined defenses	Combined days
1	Emersyn Jayne	2	4	994
2	Session Moth Martina	3	10	824
3	Raven Creed†	4	14	737+
5	Debbie Keitel	1	6	371
5	Katey Harvey	2	3	301
6	Myla Grace	1	10	232
7	Valkyrie	1	2	153
8	Nikki Storm	1	1	6

== OTT European Championship ==
The OTT European Championship is a title in Over the Top Wrestling. The championship was created to reflect the company's expansion on the continent. The championship has been defended across Europe including United Kingdom, France, Spain, Germany and Italy. The title is currently held by Jay, who is in his first reign.

=== Reign ===
Key
No.	Overall reign number
Reign	Reign number for the specific champion
Days	Number of days held
Defenses	Number of successful defenses
<1	Reign lasted less than a day
+	Current reign is changing daily

No.	Champion	Championship change			Reign statistics			Notes	Ref.
No.	Champion	Date	Event	Location	Reign	Days	Defenses	Notes	Ref.
1	Charlie Sterling	26 October 2024	OTT Tenth Anniversary	Dublin, Ireland	1	189	4	Defeated Grado, Adam Maxted, Iliya Zarkov, Damien Corvin and Goldenboy Santos in a gauntlet match to become inaugural champion.	
1	Goldenboy Santos	3 May 2025	Reckoning	Dublin, Ireland	1	98	4		
3	B. Cool	9 August 2025	CCW Takeover	Dublin, Ireland	1	72	1		
—	Vacated	20 October 2025	—	—	—	—	—	Titles announced as vacated due to B. Cool's inability to fulfill championship obligations.	
4	Trent Seven	25 October 2025	OTT Elenth Anniversary	Dublin, Ireland	1	271	7	Defeated Jay to win vacant title.	
5	Jay	23 July 2026	OTT After Dark	Dublin, Ireland	1	116+	12		

=== Combined reigns ===
Indicates the current champion

Rank	Wrestler	No. of reigns	Combined defenses	Combined days
1	Trent Seven	1	7	271
2	Charlie Sterling	1	4	189
3	Jay	1	12	116 +
4	Goldenboy Santos	1	4	98
5	B. Cool	1	0	72

== OTT Gender Neutral Championship ==
The OTT Gender Neutral Championship is a title in Over the Top Wrestling open to both male and female talent. The current champions are The Weirdos (Kat Von Kay, Frankie Vendetta and The Sem), who are in their second official reign and are co-champions. The championship is currently contested under 24/7 rules.

=== Reigns ===
Key
No.	Overall reign number
Reign	Reign number for the specific champion
Days	Number of days held
Defenses	Number of successful defenses
<1	Reign lasted less than a day
+	Current reign is changing daily

No.	Champion	Championship change			Reign statistics			Notes	Ref.
No.	Champion	Date	Event	Location	Reign	Days	Defenses	Notes	Ref.
1	B. Cool	9 December 2017	Being The Elite	Rio de Janeiro, Brazil	1	<1	1	B. Cool is recognized as the inaugural champion by OTT having produced the belt after an "OTT show in Rio De Janeiro". He was then forced to immediately defend the belt as punishment for making his own belt.	
2	Session Moth Martina	9 December 2017	Being The Elite	Dublin, Ireland	1	99	2	Martina teamed with Kay Lee Ray and defeated The Angel Cruzers (Angel Cruz and B. Cool) in a no holds barred tag team match. Martina pinned B. Cool to win the title.	
3	LJ Cleary	18 March 2018	Contenders 7: Outer Space Odyssey SuperShow	Dublin, Ireland	1	237	7		
4	Mark Haskins	10 November 2018	Redemption	Dublin, Ireland	1	162	3	This was a four-way match also involving Chris Ridgeway and Scotty Davis	
5	Terry Thatcher	21 April 2019	Contenders 14	Dublin, Ireland	1	<1	1		
6	Mark Haskins	21 April 2019	Contenders 14	Dublin, Ireland	2	259	3	Haskins cashed in his Golden Briefcase contract on Terry Thatcher immediately after losing a match to him.	
7	Adam Maxted	5 January 2020	Stickin' Out	Belfast, Northern Ireland	1	560	1		
8	Mark Haskins	18 July 2021	Welcome Back to the Second Half	Belfast, Northern Ireland	3	83	1	This match was also for the vacant OTT World Championship.	
9	Session Moth Martina	9 October 2021	Martina’s Gaff Party 6	Dublin, Ireland	2	385	3	This was a triple threat match which also involves Terry Thatcher.	
10	Jay	22 July 2022	Poetry Slam	Dublin, Ireland	1	65	1	This was a triple threat match which also involved Mike Bailey.	
11	Sammy D	25 September 2022	I’m Gonna Fight ‘Em All	Dublin, Ireland	1	83	1	This was a Title vs Title match for the OTT NLW Championship	
12	LJ Cleary	17 December 2022	Now That's Cool, OTT Christmas Party Day 1	Dublin, Ireland	2	<1	1		
13	Jay	17 December 2022	Now That's Cool, OTT Christmas Party Day 1	Dublin, Ireland	2	246	6	Jay cashed in his Golden Briefcase contract immediately following LJ Cleary's title win. Went by the name of Danny Cross during this reign.	
14	BDE (Big Bad Dirty Nicky & Bittersweet Josh)	20 August 2023	OTT Show Down	Dublin, Ireland	1	69	1	Defeated B. Cool and Jay in a tag team match to become co-champions	
15	The Sem & Renzo Rose	28 October 2023	OTT 9th Year Anniversary - Dublin	Dublin, Ireland	1	7	1	Defeated BDE, Los Muppadores and Omari & Scotty Davis in a 4 way tag team match to become co-champions	
17	BDE (Big Bad Dirty Nicky & Bittersweet Josh)	4 November 2023	Showdown in Milan	Milan, Italy	2	43	1	Bittersweet Josh defeated The Sem, Session Moth Martina and Vittorio Bruni in a 4-way match to win the belt for BDE.	
18	Celine	17 December 2023	NOW! That's What I Call Christmas - Belfast	Belfast, Northern Ireland	1	34	1	Defeated Bittersweet Josh, The Sem and Big Bad Dirty Nicky in a 4-way match	
19	BDE (Big Bad Dirty Nicky and Bittersweet Josh)	20 January 2024	Rumble Loco	Dublin, Ireland	3	<1	1	Defeated Celine backstage during 24/7 rule	
20	Celine	20 January 2024	Rumble Loco	Dublin, Ireland	2	<1	1	Defeated BDE backstage during 24/7 rule	
19	BDE (Big Bad Dirty Nicky and Bittersweet Josh)	20 January 2024	Rumble Loco	Dublin, Ireland	4	<1	1	Defeated Celine backstage during 24/7 rule	
20	Celine	20 January 2024	Rumble Loco	Dublin, Ireland	3	89	0	Defeated BDE backstage during 24/7 rule	
21	Ilija Zarkov	17 April 2024	N/A	Paris, France	1	115	0	Zarkov captured the title off camera.	
22	Goldenboy Santos	10 August 2024	OTT ScrapperMania VIII: Night 2	Dublin, Ireland	1	63	1	This was a five-way scramble, also involving Dan Barry, Daragh Lynch and Man Like DeReiss.	
—		12 October 2024	OTT Road To Tenth Anniversary	Dublin, Ireland	-	-	-	Championship retired. Physical title belt carried around by Tye Clodd, until he was ordered to surrender it to company owner Joe Cabray. Later brought back by Cabray and his Makaveli faction in May 2026 and traded back and forth with The Weirdos, albeit unofficially. Title reinstated at in August 2026 with The Weirdos recognised as defending champions.	
24	The Weirdos (Kat Von Kay, Frankie Vendetta and The Sem)	16 August 2026	Summer Bash: Belfast	Belfast, Northern Ireland	1	<1	1	Title re-activated officially with all 3 Weirdos recognised as co-champions.	
25	Session Moth Martina	16 August 2026	Summer Bash: Belfast	Belfast, Northern Ireland	3	<1	1	Won title in gauntlet match also involving Kat Von Kay, The Sem, Frankie Vendetta, Ilija Zarkov, TJ Charles and Harry McGrath	
26	The Weirdos (Kat Von Kay, Frankie Vendetta and The Sem)	16 August 2026	Summer Bash: Belfast	Belfast, Northern Ireland	2	92+	1	Joe Cabray re-introduced 24/7 rule. Kat Von Kay rolled Martina up at the ringside bar to win the title for The Weirdos.	

=== Combined reigns ===
As of November 16, 2026.

Indicates the current champion

Rank	Wrestler	No. of reigns	Successful defenses	Combined days
1	Adam Maxted	1	1	560
2	Mark Haskins	3	3	504
3	Danny Cross	2	6	311
4	Session Moth Martina	3	6	289
5	LJ Cleary	2	7	237
6	Celine	3	0	133
7	BDE (Big Bad Dirty Nicky & Bittersweet Josh)	4	3	121
8	Ilija Zarkov	1	0	115
9	The Weirdos (Kat Von Kay, Frankie Vendetta & The Sem)	2	2	92 +
10	Sammy D	1	0	83
11	Goldenboy Santos	1	1	63
12	The Sem & Renzo Rose	1	1	7
13	B. Cool	1	0	<1
13	Terry Thatcher	1	0	<1

== OTT Irish Heavyweight Championship ==
The OTT Irish Heavyweight Championship is a title in Over the Top Wrestling. The championship is a revived version of the School of Irish Wrestling Heritage Championship and has a shared lineage with the ZERO1 Ireland Heavyweight Championship and NWA Ireland Heavyweight Championship. It serves as a touring regional title around Ireland, mostly defended at smaller provincial shows. The current champion is Renzo Rose, who is in his first reign.

=== Reigns ===
Key
No.	Overall reign number
Reign	Reign number for the specific champion
Days	Number of days held
Defenses	Number of successful defenses
<1	Reign lasted less than a day
+	Current reign is changing daily

No.	Champion	Championship change			Reign statistics			Notes	Ref.
No.	Champion	Date	Event	Location	Reign	Days	Defenses	Notes	Ref.
1	Liamo	20 September 2025	OTT Live in Tullamore	Tullamore, Ireland	1	148	3	Defeated Calum Black to revive the championship.	
2	Daragh Lynch	15 February 2026	OTT Live in Laois	Mountmellick, Ireland	1	83	3	Defeated Matthew Smyth to win championship vacated by Liamo.	
3	Cian Noonan	9 May 2026	OTT Live in Ongar	Dublin, Ireland	1	42	1		
4	Renzo Rose	20 June 2026	OTT Summer Bash Tour:Wexford	Wexford, Ireland	1	149+	2		

=== Combined reigns ===
Indicates the current champion

Rank	Wrestler	No. of reigns	Combined defenses	Combined days
1	Renzo Rose	1	2	149 +
2	Liamo	1	3	148
3	Daragh Lynch	1	3	83
4	Cian Noonan	1	1	42

== See also ==
- List of professional wrestling promotions in Great Britain and Ireland
- List of professional wrestling promotions in Europe
- NXT UK
