= Noah Sunny Voyage 2024 =

2024 Pro Wrestling Noah event

NOAH Sunny Voyage 2024
- Promotional poster featuring Jack Morris and Titus Alexander
- Promotion: CyberFight
- Brand: Pro Wrestling Noah
- Date: January 17, 2024
- City: Tokyo, Japan
- Venue: Shinjuku Face
- Attendance: 281

Pay-per-view chronology
← Previous; Star Navigation 2024 (Night 1)	Next → Cross Over in Sendai 2024

Sunny Voyage chronology
← Previous; 2023	Next → Noah Sunny Voyage In Shinagawa 2 Vol. 1 NOAH Sunny Voyage In Shinagawa 2 Vol. 2

NOAH Sunny Voyage 2024 was a professional wrestling event promoted by CyberFight's sub-brand Pro Wrestling Noah and took place on January 17, 2024, in Tokyo, Japan, at the Shinjuku Face. Broadcasting was on CyberAgent's AbemaTV online linear television service and CyberFight's streaming service Wrestle Universe.

Seven matches were contested at the event. The main event saw Jack Morris defeat Titus Alexander to retain the GHC National Championship.

== Background ==
=== Storylines ===
The event featured seven professional wrestling matches that resulted from scripted storylines, where wrestlers portrayed villains, heroes, or less distinguishable characters in the scripted events that built tension and culminated in a wrestling match or series of matches.

=== Event ===
The event started with the singles confrontation between Alejandro and Ninja Mack solded with the victory of the latter. Next up, Manabu Soya, Shuji Kondo and Junta Miyawaki defeated Naomichi Marufuji, Hajime Ohara and Super Crazy in six-man tag team action. In the third bout, Masa Kitamiya and Daiki Inaba picked up a victory over Takashi Sugiura and Ulka Sasaki in tag team action. In the fourth bout, Go Shiozaki, Atsushi Kotoge and Hi69 outmatched GHC Heavyweight Champion Kenoh, Daichi Ozawa and Yu Owada in six-man tag team action. Next up, GHC Junior Heavyweight Champion Daga and Yoshinari Ogawa wrestled into a no contest against Hayata and Eita. Next up, Kaito Kiyomiya, Ryohei Oiwa, El Hijo del Dr. Wagner Jr., Dragón Bane and Alpha Wolf defeated Jake Lee, Anthony Greene, LJ Cleary and GHC Junior Heavyweight Tag Team Champions Yo-Hey, Tadasuke in ten-man tag team action.

In the main event, half of the GHC Tag Team Champions Jack Morris defeated Titus Alexander to secure the second consecutive defense of the GHC National Championship in that respective reign.

== Results ==
No.	Results	Stipulations	Times
1	Ninja Mack defeated Alejandro	Singles match	5:43
2	Manabu Soya, Shuji Kondo and Junta Miyawaki defeated Naomichi Marufuji, Hajime Ohara and Super Crazy	Six-man tag team match	10:56
3	Masa Kitamiya and Daiki Inaba defeated Takashi Sugiura and Ulka Sasaki	Tag team match	11:39
4	Team Noah (Go Shiozaki, Atsushi Kotoge and Hi69) defeated Kenoh, Taishi Ozawa and Yu Owada	Six-man tag team match	15:37
5	Stinger (Daga and Yoshinari Ogawa) vs. Hayata and Eita ended in a no-contest	Tag team match	11:30
6	Kaito Kiyomiya, Ryohei Oiwa, El Hijo del Dr. Wagner Jr. and Los Golpeadores (Dragón Bane and Alpha Wolf) defeated Good Looking Guys (Jake Lee, Anthony Greene, Yo-Hey, Tadasuke and LJ Cleary)	Ten-man tag team match	20:10
7	Jack Morris (c) defeated Titus Alexander	Singles match for the GHC National Championship	19:13
(c) / – the champion(s) heading into the match
