= Dolenc =

Dolenc is a surname. Notable people with the surname include:

- Cindy Dolenc (born 1976), Canadian actress
- Daniel Dolenc (born 1993), Finnish basketball player
- Jure Dolenc (1908–1963), American actor known as George Dolenz
- Marko Dolenc (born 1972), Slovene biathlete
- Mate Dolenc (born 1945), Slovene writer

== See also ==
- Dolenec, an alternative form
- Dolenz, a respelling
