= Dolen =

Dolen may refer to:

== Places ==
- Dolen, Blagoevgrad Province, a village in the Satovcha Municipality of Blagoevgrad Province, Bulgaria
- Dolen, Smolyan Province, a village in the Zlatograd municipality of Smolyan Province, Bulgaria
- Dolen, Texas, United States
- Dolen Peak, Antarctica
- Dolen Omurzakov Stadium, stadium in Bishkek, Kyrgyzstan

== People ==
- Caroline Dolen (born 1988), Norwegian artistic gymnast
- Dolen Perkins-Valdez, American writer

== See also ==
- Alma Dolens (1876–1948), pseudonym of Teresita Pasini
- Dølen, Norwegian weekly literary magazine published between 1858 and 1870
- Dolenz, people with that surname
- Dolan (disambiguation)
- Dolin (disambiguation)
