= Lyra Valkyria =

Irish professional wrestler (born 1996)

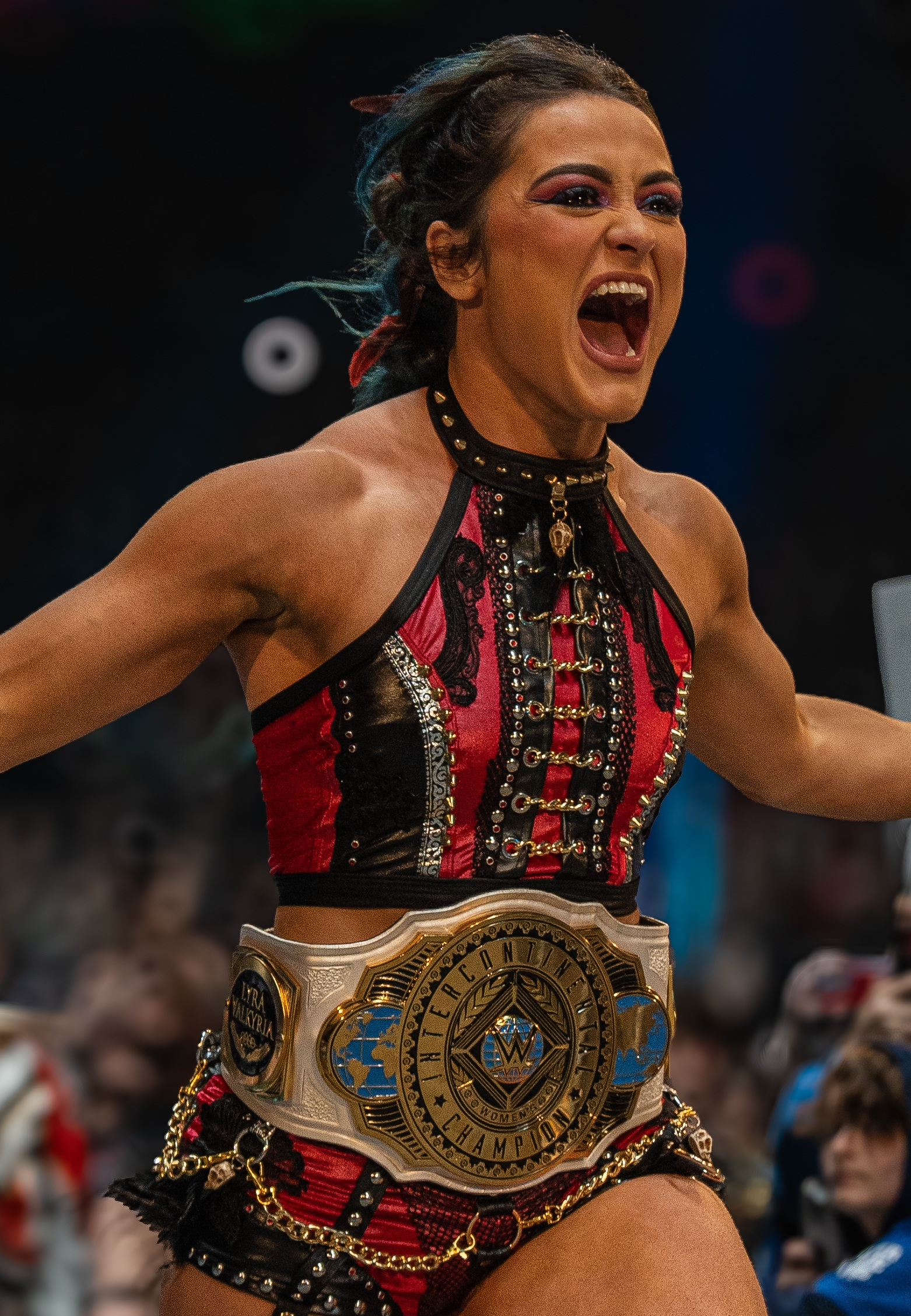
- Valkyria in 2025

Personal information
- Born: Aoife Marie Cusack; 23 October 1996 (age 30) Dublin, Ireland
- Life partners: LJ Cleary (2014–present; engaged)

Professional wrestling career
- Ring name(s): Aoife Valkyrie; Lady Valkyrie; Lyra Valkyria; Valkyrie
- Billed height: 5 ft 3 in (1.60 m)
- Billed weight: 130 lb (59 kg)
- Billed from: Dublin, Ireland
- Trained by: Fight Factory Pro Wrestling; Katey Harvey
- Debut: 2 May 2015

Aoife Marie Cusack (born 23 October 1996) is an Irish professional wrestler. She is signed to WWE, where she performs on the Raw brand under the ring name Lyra Valkyria. She is a former one-time and the inaugural Women’s Intercontinental Champion, a one-time NXT Women's Champion and a one-time WWE Women's Tag Team Champion.

Prior to joining WWE, Cusack wrestled for several promotions on the European independent circuit as Valkyrie, including Fight Factory Pro Wrestling (FFPW), Over the Top Wrestling (OTT), Westside Xtreme Wrestling (wXw) and Pro-Wrestling: EVE. She is a one-time Irish Junior Heavyweight Champion, a one-time OTT Women's Champion, and a one-time Pro-Wrestling: EVE Tag Team Champion with Debbie Keitel as The Woke Queens.

== Early life ==
Aoife Marie Cusack was born on 23 October 1996 in Dublin, and grew up in the Clarehall neighbourhood. She is the oldest of three children. Her father works at the Dublin Airport, and her mother teaches French and Irish at a secondary school. Cusack graduated from Dublin City University, where she studied journalism. She also worked at a video game store.

== Professional wrestling career ==
=== Independent circuit (2015–2020) ===
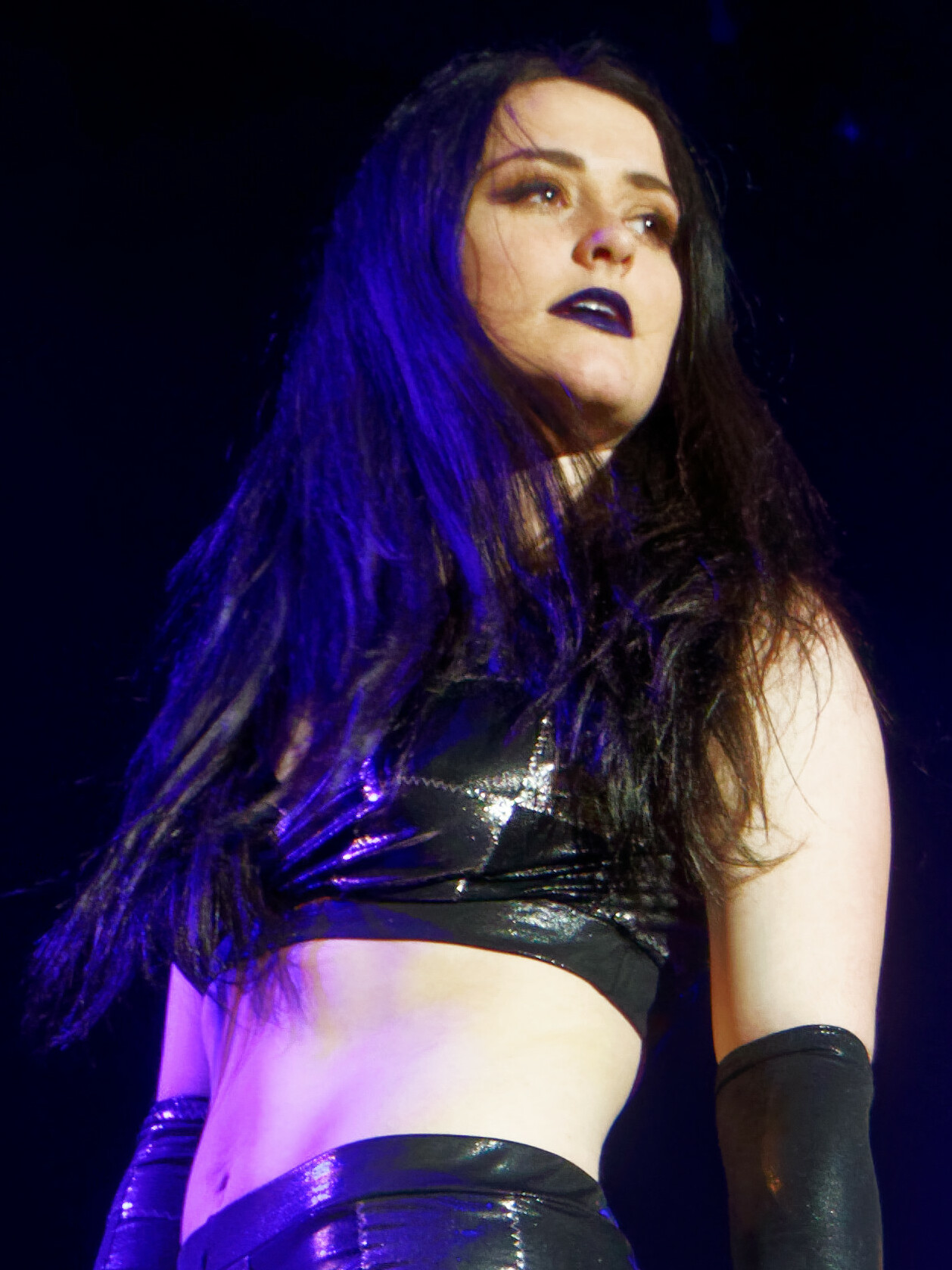
Valkyrie in January 2018

Cusack began training for a professional wrestling career in Bray in 2014, before travelling to England to attend more wrestling schools. She eventually settled at the Fight Factory Pro Wrestling (FFPW) gym in her native Dublin. She made her in-ring debut for Celtic Cross Wrestling (CCW) on 2 May 2015 under the ring name Valkyrie, named after the protagonist of the Skulduggery Pleasant book series by Derek Landy. Valkyrie made her debut for Over the Top Wrestling (OTT) at WrestleRama on 6 August 2017, teaming with Justin Shape and Katey Harvey in a loss to Martina, Candice LeRae and Joey Ryan. On 10 August 2018, she defeated Jordan Devlin to win FFPW's Irish Junior Heavyweight Championship. Under the name Lady Valkyrie, she defeated La Roux on 2 September for the Pro Wrestling Ulster (PWU) Women's Championship, which she held until PWU closed in February 2019.

On 3 May 2019, Valkyrie made her Westside Xtreme Wrestling (wXw) debut during the "Road to True Colors" tour in Bielefeld, defeating Amale Winchester and Killer Kelly in a Three-Way Dance. On 26 May, she defeated Raven Creed to win the OTT Women's Championship. She unsuccessfully challenged for the wXw Women's Championship twice in June. Valkyrie also wrestled for the women's professional wrestling promotion Pro-Wrestling: EVE, where she was part of a heel tag team with Debbie Keitel, known as the Woke Queens. They defeated Laura Di Matteo and Mercedes Martinez in a tournament final to win the vacant Pro-Wrestling: EVE Tag Team Championship on 12 October. Valkyrie lost the OTT Women's Championship to Harvey on 26 October, and the Irish Junior Heavyweight Championship to LJ Cleary on 3 November. On 14 December, the Woke Queens lost the titles to Gisele Shaw and Sammii Jayne. Valkyrie made her last independent circuit appearance for wXw on 8 March 2020, teaming with Baby Allison in a loss to Kelly and Stephanie Maze.

=== WWE ===
==== NXT UK and NXT (2020–2024) ====
Prior to signing with the company, Cusack participated in a WWE tryout in London in June 2019. Cusack was reported to have signed with WWE on 20 January 2020, and was assigned to the NXT UK brand. She competed in her first match on 13 February episode of NXT UK under the ring name Aoife Valkyrie, defeating Amale. In February, Valkyrie toured with NXT for the first time, wrestling on two house shows in Florida. Valkyrie defeated Aliyah on 14 February in Tampa, followed by teaming with Mia Yim and Rita Reis (later known as Valentina Feroz) to defeat Jessi Kamea, MJ Jenkins and Taynara in a six-woman tag team match on 15 February in Fort Pierce. She made her return to television on 17 September episode of NXT UK in a winning effort against Isla Dawn. She remained undefeated until losing to Meiko Satomura on 29 April 2021 episode. Later that year, Valkyrie suffered a torn ACL and was sidelined for a year.

After NXT UK closed in late 2022, she moved to NXT under the new ring name Lyra Valkyria, defeating Amari Miller in her debut match on 13 December episode of NXT. At the NXT Stand & Deliver pay-per-view on 1 April 2023, Valkyria competed in a ladder match for the NXT Women's Championship, which was won by Indi Hartwell. She took part in an eight-woman single-elimination tournament for the vacated title, losing to Tiffany Stratton in the finals on 28 May at NXT Battleground. After defeating Hartwell and Roxanne Perez in a triple threat match proposed by champion Becky Lynch, Valkyria bested Lynch at Night 1 of NXT: Halloween Havoc on 24 October to win the NXT Women's Championship. She made her first successful title defense against Xia Li on 21 November episode. At NXT: New Year's Evil on 2 January 2024, she retained the title against Blair Davenport. After the match, Tatum Paxley, who had been obsessed with Valkyria since December, stopped Lola Vice from cashing in her Breakout Tournament contract. At NXT Vengeance Day on 4 February, Valkyria retained the title against Perez and Vice, who cashed in while the match was in progress to make it a triple threat. On 5 March at NXT: Roadblock, Valkyria and Paxley failed to win the WWE Women's Tag Team Championship from The Kabuki Warriors (Asuka and Kairi Sane) after Valkyria inadvertently kicked Paxley. After the match, Perez attacked Valkyria and injured her arm. At NXT Stand & Deliver on 6 April, Valkyria lost the NXT Women's Championship to Perez by submission, ending her reign at 165 days. Paxley turned on Valkyria the following week and subsequently revealed that her obsession with Valkyria was only because she had the NXT Women's Championship. Valkyria wrestled her final NXT match at Week 1 of Spring Breakin' on 23 April, where she failed to regain the title from Perez in a triple threat match also involving Paxley.

==== Raw (2024–present) ====
On Night 2 of the 2024 WWE Draft, Valkyria was promoted to the Raw brand. On 6 May episode of Raw, Valkyria made her on-screen debut, saving then-Women's World Champion Becky Lynch from a beatdown by Damage CTRL's Dakota Kai, Iyo Sky and Kairi Sane, before defeating Kai in the first round of the Queen of the Ring tournament in her main roster in-ring debut. She then defeated Zoey Stark and Sky en route to the finals, where she lost to Nia Jax at King and Queen of the Ring on 25 May, marking her first loss on the main roster. Valkyria competed in the women's Money in the Bank ladder match at Money in the Bank on 6 July, which was won by Tiffany Stratton. In December, Valkyria entered the tournament for the inaugural Women's Intercontinental Championship, defeating Kai in the finals on 13 January 2025 episode of Raw to become the inaugural champion. At Royal Rumble on 1 February, she entered her first women's Royal Rumble match at number 4, but was eliminated by Ivy Nile. Over the following months, Valkyria successfully defended her title against Kai in a rematch, Nile, Raquel Rodriguez, and Bayley.

On 11 April episode of SmackDown, Valkyria and Bayley won a gauntlet match to face Liv Morgan and Raquel Rodriguez for the WWE Women's Tag Team Championship at Night 2 of WrestleMania 41 on 20 April. Prior to Night 1, Bayley was taken out backstage and was unable to compete. The following night, Becky Lynch returned from an eleven-month hiatus as Valkyria's new tag team partner, defeating Morgan and Rodriguez to win the titles, making Valkyria a double champion. They lost the titles in a rematch the next night on Raw, ending their reign at only one day, marking the shortest reign in the title's history. Immediately after, Lynch turned on Valkyria. On 10 May at Backlash, Valkyria defeated Lynch to retain the Women's Intercontinental Championship but was subjected to a post-match assault by Lynch. She lost the title to Lynch in a Last Chance match on 7 June at Money in the Bank, ending her reign at 145 days. After the match, per stipulation, Valkyria acknowledged Lynch as the better woman and raised her hand, but attacked her afterwards. At Evolution on 13 July, she failed to regain the title from Lynch in a triple threat match also involving Bayley. The next night on Raw, Valkyria defeated Bayley in a two-out-of-three falls match to earn a rematch against Lynch for the title at SummerSlam. At Night 2 of the event on 3 August, Valkyria failed to win the title in a no disqualification Last Chance match, therefore being unable to challenge for the title as long as Lynch is champion and ending their feud.

Following the event, Valkyria and Bayley began working as a tag team again. At the Royal Rumble on 31 January 2026, she entered the women's Royal Rumble match at number 26, eliminating Giulia before being eliminated by Brie Bella. On 18 April at Night 1 of WrestleMania 42, Valkyria and Bayley unsuccessfully challenged The Irresistible Forces (Nia Jax and Lash Legend) for the WWE Women's Tag Team Championship in a fatal four-way match also involving Alexa Bliss and Charlotte Flair and Brie Bella and Paige, who won the titles. On 22 June episode of Raw, after failing to win the titles from Bella and Paige, Valkyria attacked her partner Bayley, turning heel for the first time in her WWE career. At Saturday Night's Main Event XLV on July 18, Valkyria defeated Bayley by submission.

== Other media ==
Cusack made her video game debut as Lyra Valkyria in WWE 2K24 as downloadable content and has since appeared in WWE 2K25 and WWE 2K26.

== Personal life ==
Since 2014, Cusack has been in a relationship with fellow professional wrestler LJ Cleary. They announced their engagement on 14 September 2024.

== Championships and accomplishments ==
- Fight Factory Pro Wrestling
  - Irish Junior Heavyweight Championship (1 time)
- Over the Top Wrestling
  - OTT Women's Championship (1 time)
- Pro-Wrestling: EVE
  - Pro-Wrestling: EVE Tag Team Championship (1 time) – with Debbie Keitel
  - Pro-Wrestling: EVE Tag Team Championship Tournament (2019) – with Debbie Keitel
- Pro Wrestling Illustrated
  - Ranked No. 15 of the top 250 women's wrestlers in the PWI Women's 250 in 2025
- Pro Wrestling Ulster
  - PWU Women's Championship (1 time)
- WWE
  - WWE Women’s Intercontinental Championship (1 time, inaugural)
  - NXT Women's Championship (1 time)
  - WWE Women's Tag Team Championship (1 time) – with Becky Lynch
  - WWE Women's Intercontinental Championship Tournament (2025)
