= Noah Star Navigation 2024 =

2024 Pro Wrestling Noah event

NOAH Star Navigation 2024
- Promotional poster for Night 1 featuring Kenoh and Go Shiozaki
- Promotion: CyberFight
- Brand: Pro Wrestling Noah
- Date: January 13, 2024
- City: Tokyo, Japan
- Venue: Korakuen Hall
- Attendance: 1,139 (Night 1)

Pay-per-view chronology
← Previous; The New Year 2024	Next → Sunny Voyage 2024

Star Navigation chronology
← Previous; 2023	Next → Tokyo 2024

NOAH Star Navigation 2024 was a multiple-night professional wrestling event promoted by CyberFight's sub-brand Pro Wrestling Noah and took place on January 13, February 23, March 31, and April 11, 2024, in Tokyo, Japan, at the Korakuen Hall. Broadcasting was made on CyberAgent's AbemaTV online linear television service and CyberFight's streaming service Wrestle Universe.

== Background ==
=== Storylines ===
Both of the event's nights featured professional wrestling matches that resulted from scripted storylines, where wrestlers portrayed villains, heroes, or less distinguishable characters in the scripted events that built tension and culminated in a wrestling match or series of matches.

== Night 1 ==
The first night of the event took place on January 13, 2024, and started with two bouts broadcast live on Noah's YouTube channel. In the first one, Dragón Bane and Alpha Wolf picked up a victory over Ninja Mack and Alejandro, and Hayata and Eita in a three-way tag team match. In the second one, Shuhei Taniguchi defeated Ulka Sasaki in singles competition.

In the first main card bout, Atsushi Kotoge, Akitoshi Saito, Muhammad Yone and Hi69 picked up a victory over Naomichi Marufuji, Takashi Sugiura, Daichi Ozawa and Yu Owada in eight-man tag team action. Next up, El Hijo del Dr. Wagner Jr., GHC Junior Heavyweight Champion and Yoshinari Ogawa defeated Kaito Kiyomiya, Hajime Ohara and Super Crazy in six-man tag team action. After the bout concluded, Ohara issued a challenge to Daga's Junior Heavyweight title. In the fifth bout, Vinnie Massaro and Titus Alexander defeated Jack Morris and LJ Cleary in tag team action ahead of Morris and Alexander's bout for the GHC National Championship set to take place at Sunny Voyage 2024 on January 17. Next up, Manabu Soya defeated Ryohei Oiwa in singles competition. In the semi main event, Masa Kitamiya, Daiki Inaba, Shuji Kondo and Junta Miyawaki outmatched Jake Lee, Anthony Greene, Yo-Hey and Tadasuke in an eight-man tag team bout. After the match concluded, Kondo and Miyawaki issued a challenge for Yo-Hey and Tadasuke's GHC Junior Heavyweight Tag Team Championship.

In the main event, Kenoh defeated Go Shiozaki to secure the second consecutive defense of the GHC Heavyweight Championship in that respective reign. After the bout concluded, Kenoh was jumped by El Hijo del Dr. Wagner Jr. who issued a challenge for the Heavyweight title.

=== Results ===
No.	Results	Stipulations	Times
1^{P}	Los Golpeadores (Dragón Bane and Alpha Wolf) defeated Ninja Mack and Alejandro and Hayata and Eita	Three-way tag team match	9:02
2^{P}	Shuhei Taniguchi defeated Ulka Sasaki	Singles match	7:19
3	Team Noah (Atsushi Kotoge, Akitoshi Saito, Muhammad Yone and Hi69) defeated Naomichi Marufuji, Takashi Sugiura, Taishi Ozawa and Yu Owada	Eight-man tag team match	14:26
4	El Hijo del Dr. Wagner Jr. and Stinger (Daga and Yoshinari Ogawa) defeated Kaito Kiyomiya, Hajime Ohara and Super Crazy	Six-man tag team match	8:11
5	Vinnie Massaro and Titus Alexander defeated Good Looking Guys (Jack Morris and LJ Cleary)	Tag team match	10:25
6	Manabu Soya defeated Ryohei Oiwa	Singles match	11:24
7	Masa Kitamiya, Daiki Inaba, Shuji Kondo and Junta Miyawaki defeated Good Looking Guys (Jake Lee, Anthony Greene, Yo-Hey and Tadasuke)	Eight-man tag team match	16:33
8	Kenoh (c) defeated Go Shiozaki	Singles match for the GHC Heavyweight Championship	21:07
(c) / – the champion(s) heading into the match; P / – the match was broadcast on the pre-show

== Night 2 ==
NOAH Star Navigation 2024 (Night 2)
- Promotional poster for Night 2 featuring Yo-Hey, Tadasuke, Hayata and Eita
- Promotion: CyberFight
- Brand: Pro Wrestling Noah
- Date: February 23, 2024
- City: Tokyo, Japan
- Venue: Korakuen Hall
- Attendance: 1,115

Pay-per-view chronology
← Previous; Cross Over in Sendai 2024	Next → Great Voyage in Yokohama 2024

The second night of the event took place on February 23, 2024, at the Korakuen Hall. The event started with two preshow confrontation broadcast live on Noah's YouTube channel. In the first one, Alejandro defeated Hi69 in singles competition and in the second one, GHC Junior Heavyweight Champion Daga and Yoshinari Ogawa picked up a victory over Hajime Ohara and Super Crazy.

In the first main card bout, Ninja Mack defeated Junta Miyawaki in singles competition. Next up, Go Shiozaki, Atsushi Kotoge, Dragón Bane and Alpha Wolf outmatched the team of Masa Kitamiya, Daiki Inaba, Takashi Sugiura and Ulka Sasaki in a Victory Challenge tag league scramble. Next up, Manabu Soya, Shuji Kondo, Timothy Thatcher and Saxon Huxley defeated Kenoh, Kaito Kiyomiya, Ryohei Oiwa and Yu Owada in the same kind of scramble. In the sixth bout, Naomichi Marufuji and Kazuyuki Fujita defeated Jake Lee and LJ Cleary in tag team action. In the semi main event, Jack Morris defeated Good Looking Guys stablemate and GHC Tag Team Championship partner at the time Anthony Greene to secure the third consecutive defense of the GHC National Championship in that respective reign.

In the main event, Yo-Hey and Tadasuke defeated Hayata and Eita to secure the second consecutive defense of the GHC Junior Heavyweight Tag Team Championship in that respective reign. After the bout concluded, Tadasuke called out Daga to challenge him for the GHC Junior Heavyweight Championship which the latter accepted on the condition of a reverse challenge for the junior tag team titles with Yoshinari Ogawa as his partner.

=== Results ===
No.	Results	Stipulations	Times
1^{P}	Alejandro defeated Hi69	Singles match	7:44
2^{P}	Stinger (Daga and Yoshinari Ogawa) defeated Hajime Ohara and Super Crazy	Tag team match	8:46
3	Ninja Mack defeated Junta Miyawaki	Singles match	7:30
4	Team Noah (Go Shiozaki and Atsushi Kotoge) and Los Golpeadores (Dragón Bane and Alpha Wolf) defeated Masa Kitamiya, Daiki Inaba, Takashi Sugiura and Ulka Sasaki	Victory Challenge tag league scramble	11:04
5	Manabu Soya, Shuji Kondo and Real (Timothy Thatcher and Saxon Huxley) defeated Kenoh, Kaito Kiyomiya, Ryohei Oiwa and Yu Owada	Victory Challenge tag league scramble	9:33
6	Naomichi Marufuji and Kazuyuki Fujita defeated Good Looking Guys (Jake Lee and LJ Cleary)	Tag team match	13:54
7	Jack Morris (c) defeated Anthony Greene	Singles match for the GHC National Championship	20:28
8	Good Looking Guys (Yo-Hey and Tadasuke) (c) defeated Hayata and Eita	Tag team match for the GHC Junior Heavyweight Tag Team Championship	13:19
(c) / – the champion(s) heading into the match; P / – the match was broadcast on the pre-show

== Night 3 ==
NOAH Star Navigation 2024 (Night 3)
- Promotional poster for Night 3 featuring El Hijo de Dr. Wagner Jr. and Jake Lee
- Promotion: CyberFight
- Brand: Pro Wrestling Noah
- Date: March 31, 2024
- City: Tokyo, Japan
- Venue: Korakuen Hall
- Attendance: 1,338

Pay-per-view chronology
← Previous; Great Voyage in Yokohama 2024	Next → Star Navigation Night 4

The third night of the event took place on March 31, 2024, at the Korakuen Hall. The event started with three preshow confrontation broadcast live on Noah's YouTube channel. In the first one, Masa Kitamiya defeated Shuhei Taniguchi in singles competition. In the second one Atsushi Kotoge and Go Shiozaki picked up a victory over Hajime Ohara and Takashi Sugiura in tag team action, and in the third one, one half of the time's GHC Tag Team Champions Anthony Greene outmatched Daiki Inaba in singles action.

In the first main card bout, GHC Junior Heavyweight Champion Daga, Yoshinari Ogawa and Super Crazy defeated Alejandro, Junta Miyawaki and Ninja Mack in six-man tag team competition. After the bout concluded, Daga received a title challenge from Alejandro in a bout which was set for Noah Wrestle Magic on May 4, 2024. Next up, Kaito Kiyomiya and Ryohei Oiwa outmatched Kenoh and Yu Owada in tag team action. The sixth bout of the event saw Naomichi Marufuji picking up a victory over Ulka Sasaki. In the semi main event, Dragón Bane and Alpha Wolf teamed up with Hayata to defeat GHC National Champion Jack Morris and GHC Junior Heavyweight Tag Team Champions Tadasuke and Yo-Hey.

In the main event, El Hijo de Dr. Wagner Jr. defeated Jake Lee to secure the first and only successful defense of the GHC Heavyweight Championship in that respective reign.

=== Results ===
No.	Results	Stipulations	Times
1^{P}	Masa Kitamiya defeated Shuhei Taniguchi	Singles match	8:18
2^{P}	Atsushi Kotoge and Go Shiozaki defeated Hajime Ohara and Takashi Sugiura	Tag team match	10:39
3^{P}	Anthony Greene defeated Daiki Inaba	Singles match	8:42
4	Stinger (Daga and Yoshinari Ogawa) and Super Crazy defeated Alejandro, Junta Miyawaki and Ninja Mack	Six-man tag team match	13:47
5	Kaito Kiyomiya and Ryohei Oiwa defeated Kenoh and Yu Owada	Tag team match	14:47
6	Naomichi Marufuji defeated Ulka Sasaki	Singles match	14:10
7	Los Golpeadores (Dragón Bane and Alpha Wolf) and Hayata defeated Good Looking Guys (Jack Morris, Tadasuke and Yo-Hey)	Six-man tag team match	10:28
8	El Hijo de Dr. Wagner Jr. (c) defeated Jake Lee	Singles match for the GHC Heavyweight Championship	28:25
(c) / – the champion(s) heading into the match; P / – the match was broadcast on the pre-show

== Night 4 ==
NOAH Star Navigation 2024 (Night 4)
- Promotional poster for Night 4 featuring Kenoh and Kaito Kiyomiya
- Promotion: CyberFight
- Brand: Pro Wrestling Noah
- Date: April 11, 2024
- City: Tokyo, Japan
- Venue: Korakuen Hall
- Attendance: 935

Pay-per-view chronology
← Previous; Star Navigation Night 3	Next → Wrestle Magic

The fourth night of the event took place on April 11, 2024, at the Korakuen Hall. The event started with the three-way confrontation between Alejandro, Alpha Wolf and Ninja Mack, solded [sic?] with the victory of the latter. In the second bout, Daiki Inaba defeated Yu Owada in singles competition. Next up, Anthony Greene, Tadasuke and Yo-Hey picked up a victory over Atsushi Kotoge, Hi69 and Mohammed Yone in six-man tag team competition. The fourth bout saw Daga and Yoshinari Ogawa who teamed up with Ulka Sasaki defeating Hajime Ohara, Junta Miyawaki and Shuji Kondo in six-man tag team competition. Next up, Hayata defeated Jack Morris to win the GHC National Championship, ending the latter's reign at 166 days and three successful defenses. In the semi main event, Go Shiozaki, Kazuyuki Fujita, Naomichi Marufuji and Takashi Sugiura defeated El Hijo del Dr. Wagner Jr., Jake Lee, Masa Kitamiya and Ryohei Oiwa in eight-man tag team action.

The main event saw Kaito Kiyomiya defeating Kenoh in a number one contendership match for the GHC Heavyweight Championship.

=== Results ===
No.	Results	Stipulations	Times
1	Ninja Mack defeated Alejandro and Alpha Wolf by pinfall	Three-way match	8:38
2	Daiki Inaba defeated Yu Owada by pinfall	Singles match	8:21
3	Good Looking Guys (Anthony Greene, Tadasuke and Yo-Hey) defeated Atsushi Kotoge, Hi69 and Mohammed Yone by pinfall	Six-man tag team match	8:54
4	Stinger (Daga and Yoshinari Ogawa) and Ulka Sasaki defeated Hajime Ohara, Junta Miyawaki and Shuji Kondo by pinfall	Six-man tag team match	12:10
5	Hayata (c) defeated Jack Morris by pinfall	Singles match for the GHC National Championship	15:12
6	Go Shiozaki, Kazuyuki Fujita, Naomichi Marufuji and Takashi Sugiura defeated El Hijo del Dr. Wagner Jr., Jake Lee, Masa Kitamiya and Ryohei Oiwa by pinfall	Eight-man tag team match	18:17
7	Kaito Kiyomiya defeated Kenoh by pinfall	Singles match	23:49
(c) / – the champion(s) heading into the match
