= Alići, Zavidovići =

Alići Алићи
- Village
- Location within Bosnia and Herzegovina
- Coordinates: 44.4628°N 18.1548°E
- Country: Bosnia and Herzegovina
- Entity: Federation of Bosnia and Herzegovina
- Canton: Zenica-Doboj
- Municipality: Zavidovići

Area
  - Total: 0.54 sq mi (1.40 km^{2})

Population (2013)
  - Total: 621
  - Density: 1,150/sq mi (444/km^{2})
- Time zone: UTC+1 (CET)
  - Summer (DST): UTC+2 (CEST)

Alići is a village in the municipality of Zavidovići, Bosnia and Herzegovina. The village has a historical and sporting partnership with Dolina. It has a population of 621 according to the 2013 census.

== Geography ==
Alići is located in the Zavidovići municipality south of Dolina. It is roughly 4.4 km away from Zavidovići city.

== History and sports ==
Alići maintains strong relations with the neighboring village of Dolina, commonly being grouped into a wider community with it.

Soldiers from the Dolina-Alići community fought during the Bosnian War. The lives of these soldiers were commemorated in Nijaz Mačak's book "They defended Zavidovići, Dolina and Alići," which was released in July 2025.

=== Flood ===
Alići was damaged significantly during the flood in Bosnia in May of 2014. In August 2016, the municipal government announced post-flood reconstruction projects, including the construction of a steel-rope bridge connected to Alići and Dolina to nearby communities.

=== Football club ===
Alići and Dolina also share a local football club, known as "Dolina-Alići." The 4th memorial tournament in Zavidovići, known as "Asmir Zilkić," was played in late 2012, where the club won.

== Demographics ==
According to the 2013 census, its population was 621.

Ethnicity in 2013
Ethnicity	Number	Percentage
Bosniaks	571	91.9%
Croats	13	2.1%
Serbs	2	0.3%
other/undeclared	35	5.6%
Total	621	100%

In 1991, 57 Croats resided in the village, but according to the 2013 census, the number has declined to 13.
