= Noah Star Navigation in Tokyo 2024 =

2024 Pro Wrestling Noah event

NOAH Star Navigation in Tokyo 2024
- Promotional poster of the event featuring Kaito Kiyomiya and Ryohei Oiwa
- Promotion: CyberFight
- Brand: Pro Wrestling Noah
- Date: September 14, 2024
- City: Tokyo, Japan
- Venue: Korakuen Hall
- Attendance: 1,391

Pay-per-view chronology
← Previous; Destination 2024	Next → Star Navigation Premium: Akitoshi Saito Road Last

Star Navigation chronology
← Previous; Star Navigation 2024	Next → Star Navigation Premium 2025

NOAH Star Navigation in Tokyo 2024 was a professional wrestling event promoted by CyberFight's sub-brand Pro Wrestling Noah and took place on September 14, 2024, in Tokyo, Japan, at the Korakuen Hall. Broadcasting was made on CyberAgent's AbemaTV online linear television service and CyberFight's streaming service Wrestle Universe.

Seven matches were contested at the event, including two on the pre-show. The main event saw GHC Heavyweight Champion Kaito Kiyomiya defeat Ryohei Oiwa in a non-title bout, this would be Oiwa's final match of his "foreign" excursion before returning to New Japan Pro-Wrestling (NJPW). In another prominent match, Manabu Soya defeated Ulka Sasaki to win the GHC National Championship.

== Background ==
=== Storylines ===
The event featured seven professional wrestling matches that resulted from scripted storylines, where wrestlers portrayed villains, heroes, or less distinguishable characters in the scripted events that built tension and culminated in a wrestling match or series of matches.

=== Event ===
The event started with two preshow confrontations broadcast live on Noah's YouTube channel. In the first one, Yu Owada defeated Daiki Odashima in singles competition. In the second one, Eita and Shuji Kondo defeated Kai Fujimura and Shuhei Taniguchi in tag team competition.

In the first main card bout, Masa Kitamiya and GHC Tag Team Champions Naomichi Marufuji and Takashi Sugiura picked up a victory over Alejandro, Cristobal and Kenoh in six-man tag team competition. Next up, GHC Junior Heavyweight Champion Daga teamed up with El Hijo de Dr. Wagner Jr. and Galeno del Mal to defeat Dragón Bane, Alpha Wolf and Super Crazy in six-man tag team competition. In the fifth match, GHC Junior Heavyweight Tag Team Champions Hayata and Yo-Hey, Tadasuke and Yuto Kikuchi defeated Amakusa, Atsushi Kotoge, Hajime Ohara and Junta Miyawaki in Ratel's first pay-per-view bout since the stable's return. In the semi main event, Manabu Soya defeated Ulka Sasaki to capture the GHC National Championship, ending the latter's reign at 63 days and no defenses.

In the main event, GHC Heavyweight Champion Kaito Kiyomiya defeated Ryohei Oiwa in a singles non-title bout which represented Oiwa's final match of his "foreign" excursion as he was set to return to native promotion New Japan Pro-Wrestling (NJPW).

== Results ==
No.	Results	Stipulations	Times
1^{P}	Yu Owada defeated Daiki Odashima	Singles match	6:50
2^{P}	Eita and Shuji Kondo defeated Kai Fujimura and Shuhei Taniguchi	Tag team match	6:46
3	Masa Kitamiya, Naomichi Marufuji and Takashi Sugiura defeated All Rebellion (Alejandro, Cristobal and Kenoh)	Six-man tag team match	9:40
4	Daga, El Hijo de Dr. Wagner Jr. and Galeno del Mal defeated Los Golpeadores (Dragón Bane and Alpha Wolf) and Super Crazy	Six-man tag team match	10:35
5	Ratel's (Hayata, Yo-Hey, Tadasuke and Yuto Kikuchi) defeated Amakusa, Atsushi Kotoge, Hajime Ohara and Junta Miyawaki	Eight-man tag team match	12:21
6	Manabu Soya defeated Ulka Sasaki (c)	Singles match for the GHC National Championship	15:29
7	Kaito Kiyomiya defeated Ryohei Oiwa	Singles match	27:06
(c) / – the champion(s) heading into the match; P / – the match was broadcast on the pre-show
