= Dolina, Kamnik =

Dolina
- Location in Slovenia
- Coordinates: 46°13′06″N 14°51′04″E
- Country: Slovenia
- Traditional region: Upper Carniola
- Statistical region: Central Slovenia
- Municipality: Kamnik
- Elevation: 607 m (1,991 ft)

Dolina (pronounced [dɔˈliːna]) is a former settlement in the Municipality of Kamnik in central Slovenia. It is now part of the village of Špitalič. The area is part of the traditional region of Upper Carniola. The municipality is now included in the Central Slovenia Statistical Region.

== Geography ==
Dolina lies below the southeast slope of Glisnik Hill (elevation: 714 meters or 2,343 feet), about 400 meters (1,300 ft) north of the main road through Špitalič in the valley of Motnišnica Creek.

== Name ==
Dolina was attested in historical sources as Tal and Tall in 1360, and Klaintall in 1488. The name Dolina is a common toponym in Slovenia as well as other Slavic countries (cf. villages named Dolina in Bulgaria, Poland, and Russia). The name is derived from the common noun dolina 'valley', referring to the local topography.

== History ==
Dolina was annexed by Bela in 1952, ending its existence as an independent settlement. It was later transferred to Špitalič.

== Cultural heritage ==
There is a chapel-shrine in Dolina dedicated to the Rosary. It stands in the northeast part of the settlement and dates from 1912.
