= LJ Cleary =

Irish professional wrestler (born 1999)

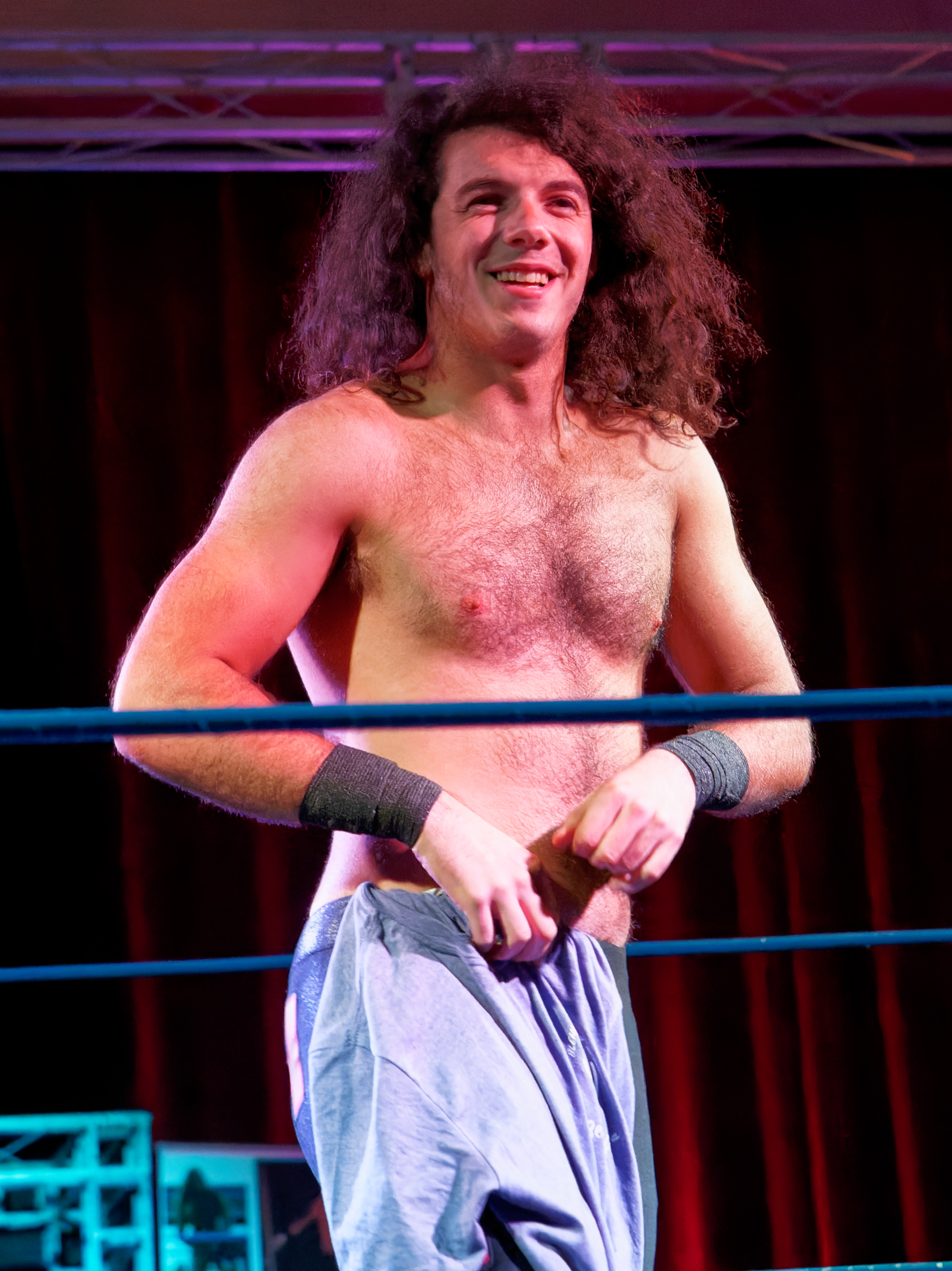
- Cleary in October 2021

Personal information
- Born: Lee Joseph Cleary; March 12, 1999 (age 27) Dublin, Ireland
- Life partner: Lyra Valkyria (2024–present)

Professional wrestling career
- Ring name: LJ Cleary
- Billed height: 177 cm (5 ft 10 in)
- Billed weight: 88 kg (194 lb)
- Trained by: Phil Boyd
- Debut: 2014

Lee Joseph Cleary (born 12 March 1999) is an Irish professional wrestler. He is currently performs on the other promotions European independent scene and United States. He also performed in Japan for Pro Wrestling Noah as a former member of the Good Looking Guys stable.

== Professional wrestling career ==
=== European independent scene (2014–present) ===
Cleary made his professional wrestling debut at FFPW, an event co-promoted by Fight Factory Pro Wrestling and Union Of European Wrestling Alliances (UEWA) on March 23, 2014, where he teamed up with Bobby Calloway, Del PC and Mary Foy in a losing effort against Adam O'Brien, Colm Day, Luke Barry and Ross Browne as a result of an eight-man tag team match. He is known for his tenures with various promotions from the European independent scene with which he has shared brief or longer stints such as TNT Extreme Wrestling, Westside Xtreme Wrestling, German Wrestling Federation, Insane Championship Wrestling, DEFY Wrestling, Celtic Championship Wrestling and many others. He competed in the 2021 edition of Revolution Pro Wrestling's British J-Cup where he fell short to Michael Oku in the first rounds.

=== Over the Top Wrestling (2017–present) ===
One of the promotions Cleary is mostly known for competing in is Over the Top Wrestling. He made his debut at OTT Contenders, a house show promoted on May 28, 2017, where he teamed up with Gavin Fitz and Michael May in a losing effort against DJ Frosty and The Lads From The Flats (Paddy M and Workie). During his time in the promotion, Cleary chased for various championships promoted by it. He is a former OTT No Limits Champion, having won the title at The Draw - Dublin on July 15, 2023, by defeating Trent Seven. He is also a former OTT Gender Neutral Championship, title which he has won on two separate occasions, first at Contenders 7: Outer Space Odyssey SuperShow on March 18, 2018, by defeating Session Moth Martina, and secondly on December 17, 2022, at Now That's Cool, OTT Christmas Party Day 1 by defeating Sammy D.

=== Progress Wrestling (2019–2023) ===
Cleary made sporadic appearances in Progress Wrestling. He first competed at PROGRESS Chapter 91: Prog On The Tyne on July 6, 2019, where he teamed up with "More Than Hype" stablemates Darren Kearney and Nathan Martin to defeat Do Not Resuscitate (Chuck Mambo, Spike Trivet and William Eaver) in a six-man tag team match. One night later at PROGRESS Chapter 92: Entertaining Friends, Cleary defeated Chuck Mambo in singles competition. At PROGRESS Chapter 101: Dalmatians on January 19, 2020, he unsuccessfully challenged Kyle Fletcher in a qualifier bout for the PROGRESS World Championship. At PROGRESS Chapter 103: Beer Snake City on February 23, 2020, Cleary teamed up with Darren Kearney and Nathan Martin in a losing effort against The Anti-Fun Police (Chief Deputy Dunne and Los Federales Santos Jr.) and Walter. At PROGRESS Chapter 125: Castle Of Illusion on November 13, 2021, he fell short to Kid Lykos. At PROGRESS Chapter 156: Steal Yourself on September 10, 2023, Cleary defeated Yoshiki Inamura in singles competition.

=== Pro Wrestling Noah (2023–present) ===
Cleary started his excursion in Japan with Pro Wrestling Noah, making his debut at NOAH Monday Magic #1 on October 9, 2023, where he teamed up with Ryohei Oiwa in a losing effort against Good Looking Guys (Anthony Greene and Jake Lee). After the bout, Cleary was presented as Good Looking Guys' stable's newest member. He made his first pay-per-view appearance at Noah Demolition Stage In Fukuoka 2023 on October 28, where he teamed up with stablemate Anthony Greene in a losing effort against Kaito Kiyomiya and Ryohei Oiwa. At Noah Star Navigation 2024 on January 13, Cleary teamed up with Jack Morris in a losing effort against Vinnie Massaro and Titus Alexander. At Noah Sunny Voyage 2024 on January 17, he teamed up with Jake Lee, Anthony Greene, Yo-Hey, Tadasuke in a losing effort against Kaito Kiyomiya, Ryohei Oiwa, El Hijo del Dr. Wagner Jr. and Los Golpeadores (Dragón Bane and Alpha Wolf) as a result of a Ten-man tag team match. Cleary scored his first pay-per-view victory at Noah Cross Over in Sendai 2024 on February 4, where he defeated Ninja Mack and Alejandro in a three-way match. On the second night of the Noah Star Navigation 2024 event, Cleary teamed up with Jake Lee against Naomichi Marufuji and Kazuyuki Fujita in a losing effort.

=== Impact Wrestling / Total Nonstop Action Wrestling (2026–present) ===
On the September 17 episode of Impact, Cleary lost to Rich Swann in a TNA X Division Championship Tournament match. At Bound for Glory, Cleary competed in a 21-person Call Your Shot Gauntlet where he was eliminated by Bear Bronson.

== Personal life ==
Cleary is currently in a relationship with fellow professional wrestler Aoife Cusack, who currently competes in WWE under the ring name Lyra Valkyria. They announced their engagement on September 14, 2024.

== Championships and accomplishments ==
- Fight Factory Pro Wrestling
  - Irish Junior Heavyweight Championship (3 times, current)
- Irish Tag Team Championship (2 time) – with Fabio ( 1 time) and with Rich Swann (1 time)
- Full Impact Pro
  - FIP World Tag Team Championship (1 time) – with Rich Swann
- Hard Knox Pro Wrestling
  - Hard Knox World Championship (2 times)
  - Golden Ticket Tournament (2023)
- No Limit Wrestling
  - NLW Nationwide Championship (1 time)
  - NLW Tag Team Championship (1 time) - with Amy Allonsy
- Over the Top Wrestling
  - OTT Gender Neutral Championship (2 times)
  - OTT No Limits Championship (1 time)
- Flemish Wrestling Force
  - Flemish Championship (1 time)
- Pro Wrestling Showdown
  - PWS Goldmembership Championship (1 time)
- Rebel County Wrestling
  - Rebel County Wrestling World Championship (1 time)
- Pro Wrestling Illustrated
  - Ranked No. 397 of the top 500 singles wrestlers in the PWI 500 in 2026
