= Morris Scott Dollens =

American artist and writer

Morris Scott Dollens (April 14, 1920 – August 14, 1994) was an American artist and writer of science fiction. He began his career in science-fiction fanzines in 1936, at the age of 16. He later became famous for paintings he created for science fiction books and magazines in the 1950s. He was a congenial man and could be seen with his paintings at many science fiction conventions and related events. His paintings have been featured in many science fiction art books.

In his early fanzines, he employed a printing technique called hectography, which was similar to the ditto machine process of reproduction commonly used through the 1980s and allowed the use of different colors in the text.

Dollens painted at least 1700 paintings and continued selling them until 1989. His work is famous for his renderings of planetscapes, and he often painted Saturn in particular, with its moons, and also renderings of distant suns. The paintings themselves are often of an exceptionally durable construction, made with acrylic paint on Masonite.

Dollens made photographic slides of all of his paintings. A major collection of these slides is housed at University of California at Riverside in California, United States.

A database of known Dollens paintings is maintained at the Morris Scott Dollens Registry and User Group.
