= Fight Factory Pro Wrestling =

Irish professional wrestling promotion

- Acronym: FFPW
- Founded: March 2004
- Style: Professional wrestling Lucha libre Sports entertainment
- Headquarters: Bray, County Wicklow, Ireland
- Founder(s): Fergal Devitt and Paul Tracey
- Owner: Phil Boyd
- Formerly: NWA Ireland
- Website: ffpwwrestling.com

Fight Factory Pro Wrestling (FFPW), also known as Zero1 Ireland, is an Irish wrestling training school and professional wrestling promotion run by Phil Boyd and Katey Harvey, based in Dublin. FFPW promotion tours theatres, leisure centres, and town halls.

== History ==
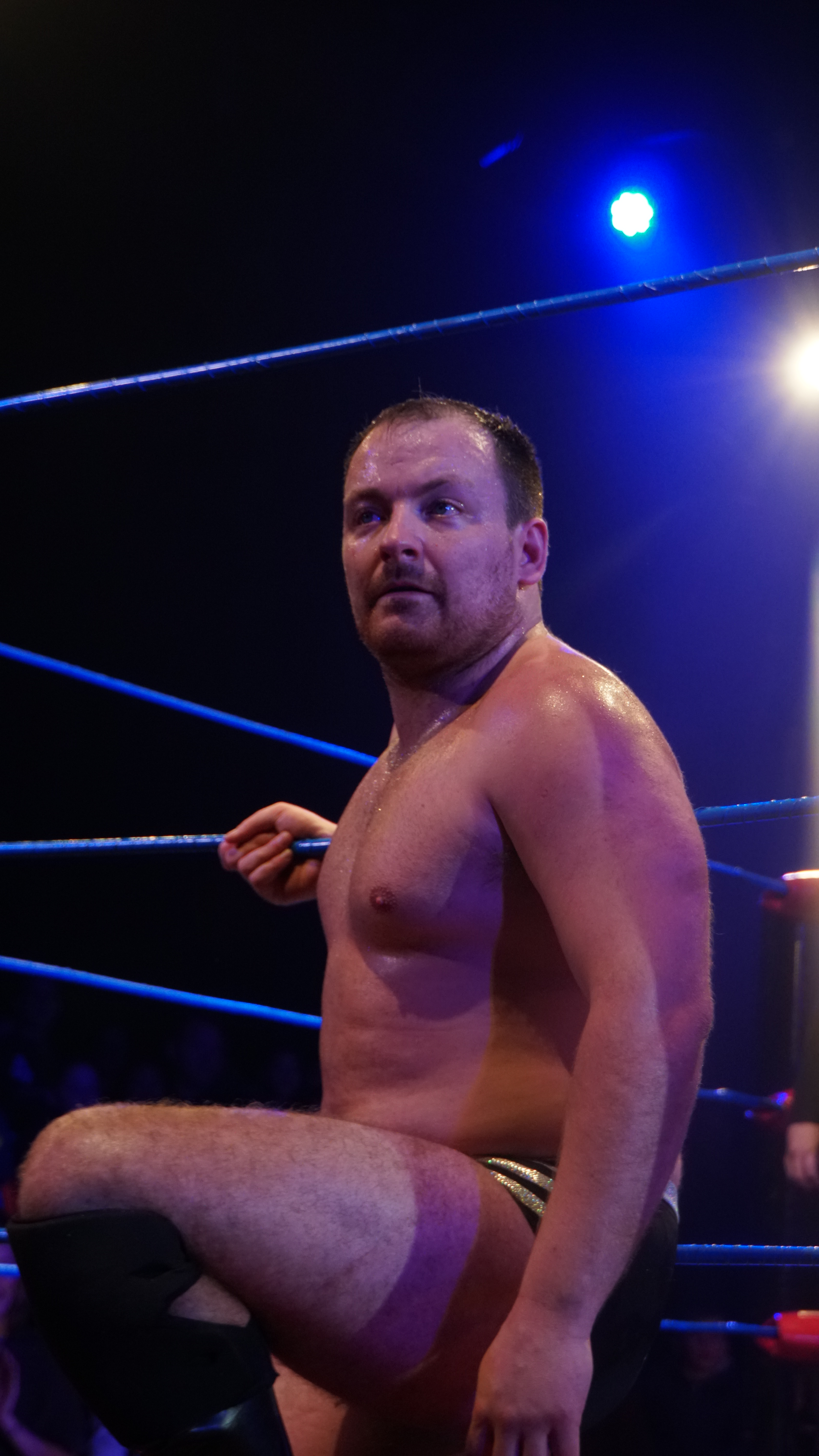
Owner and wrestler Phil Boyd

Fight Factory Pro Wrestling (FFPW) was an affiliate of the National Wrestling Alliance (NWA)'s NWA UK Hammerlock territory until 2012. It became affiliated with the Union of European Wrestling Alliances in 2011 and with Japan's Pro Wrestling Zero1 in 2012. The promotion was founded by Fergal Devitt (Finn Bálor) in 2004; Phil Boyd would later become the owner of FFPW, succeeding Devitt and his partner Paul Tracey.

== Championships ==
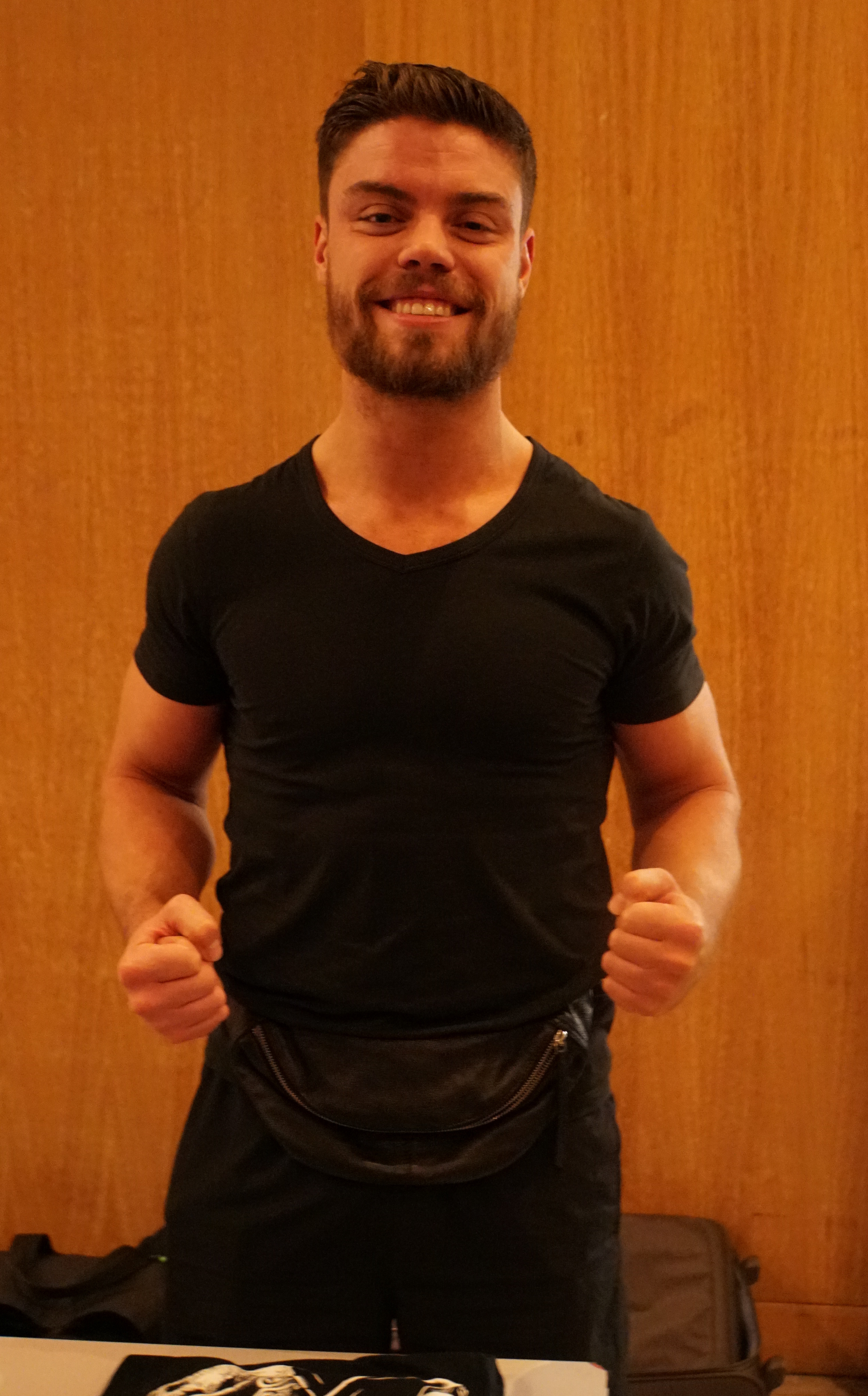
Former Irish Junior Heavyweight champion Jordan Devlin

=== Champions ===
Title	Current holder	Date won	Location	Previous champion	Reference
Irish Junior Heavyweight Championship	LJ Cleary	4 September 2026	Dublin, Ireland	JB	
Irish Tag Team Heavyweight Championship	Fabio & Martin Steers	26 June 2026	Dublin, Ireland	CBL & Gallachini	

== Notable alumni ==
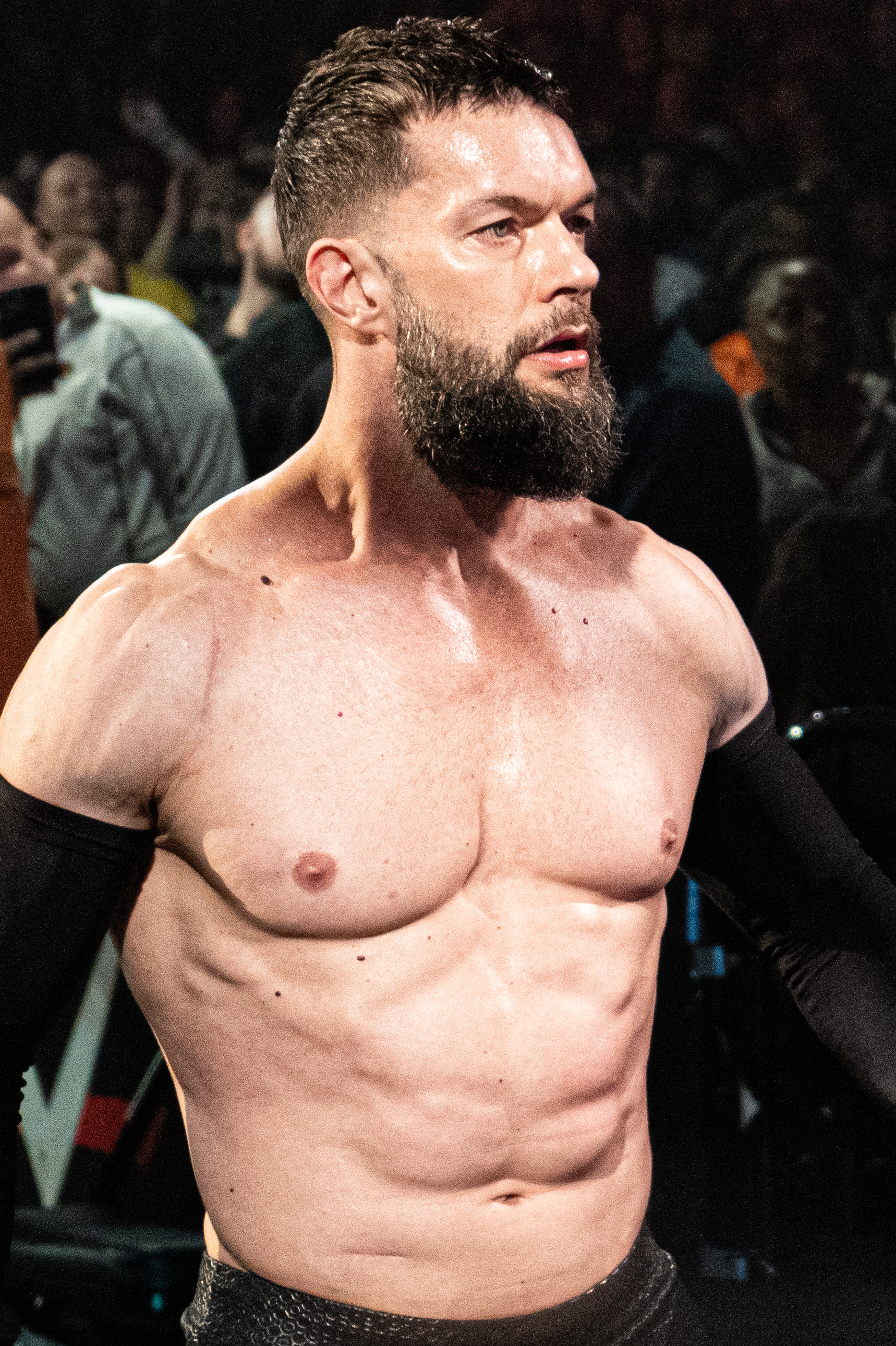
Founder Fergal Devitt (Finn Bálor) helped train many wrestlers

=== School ===
- LJ Cleary
- Jordan Devlin
- Rebecca Knox
- Aoife Valkyrie
- Debbie Keitel
- Max Horan
- Aura
- Big Rab
- Andy Steele
- The Scoop
- Jay Stynes
- Tommy Ellis
- Harry “UCD” McGrath
- Delsin Brooks
- Yung Jay
- Big Beamish
- Michael May
- Dom Tuck

=== Promotion ===
- Leyton Buzzard
- Joe Coffey
- Noam Dar
- Man Like DeReiss
- Fergal Devitt
- Jonathan Gresham
- Scotty 2 Hotty
- Paul London
- Leon Slater
- James Storm
- Rich Swann

== See also ==
- Professional wrestling in the United Kingdom and Ireland
- List of professional wrestling promotions in Europe
