= Gregory Dolin =

American lawyer and judge

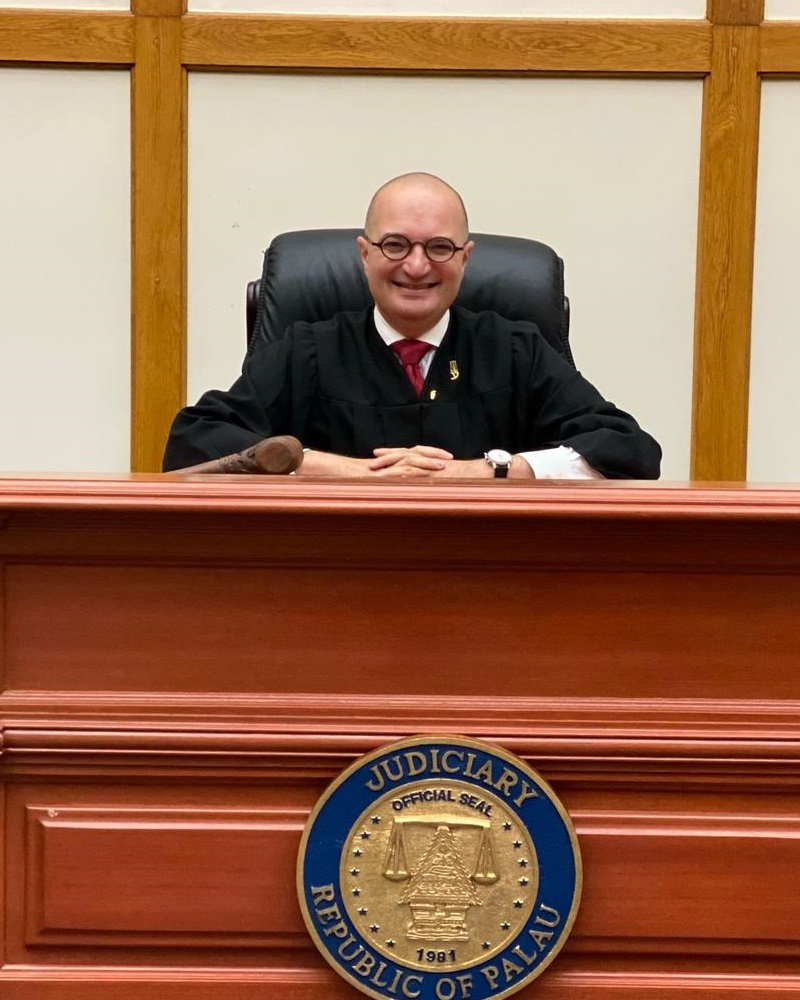

Associate Justice of the Supreme Court of Palau
- In office January 7, 2020 – January 3, 2022
- Appointed by: Thomas Remengesau Jr.
- Preceded by: R. Barrie Michelsen
- Succeeded by: Fred M. Isaacs

Gregory Dolin is an American lawyer and law professor who served as an associate justice of the Supreme Court of Palau, having been sworn into office on January 7, 2020. He resigned in January 2022 in order to return to his regular duties as a law professor in the University of Baltimore School of Law. As of 2025, he remains on the faculty there.

Dolin received a B.A. with honors from the Johns Hopkins University in 1998, followed by an M.A. from the George Washington University, a J.D. cum laude from the Georgetown University Law Center in 2004, and an M.D. with Recognition in Humanities from the Stony Brook University in 2005.

He previously served as a law clerk to Judge Pauline Newman of the United States Court of Appeals for the Federal Circuit, and to Judge Hiram Emory Widener Jr. of the United States Court of Appeals for the Fourth Circuit. In 2023, Dolin assisted Judge Newman with her defense against efforts by other judges of the Federal Circuit to force her to retire against her will.
