= Dijana Alić =

Bosnian architect

Dijana Alić is a Bosnian-Australian architect and academic.

She was born in Sarajevo and received degree in architecture from the University of Sarajevo and a M.Arch. and a PhD from the University of New South Wales. Alić is a lecturer and program coordinator for the School of Architecture and Design at the University of New South Wales. Previous to her academic career, she worked as an architect and consulted on a number of large projects.

Her work has been published in various international journals, including the Journal of the Society of Architectural Historians, Open House International, Centropa and Fabrications. Her interests lie in exploring the relationship between the sociological and political environment and architecture.
