= Dolan's =

Coordinates: 52°39′31″N 8°38′17″W

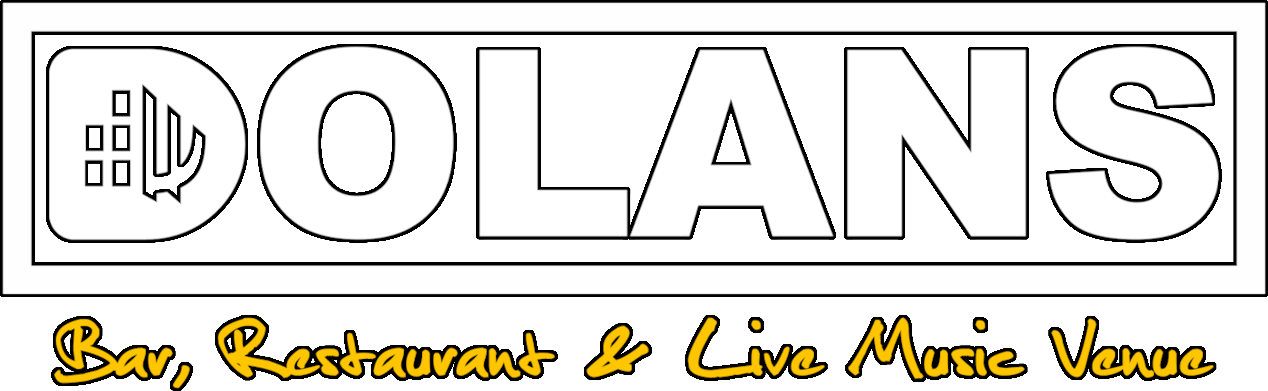

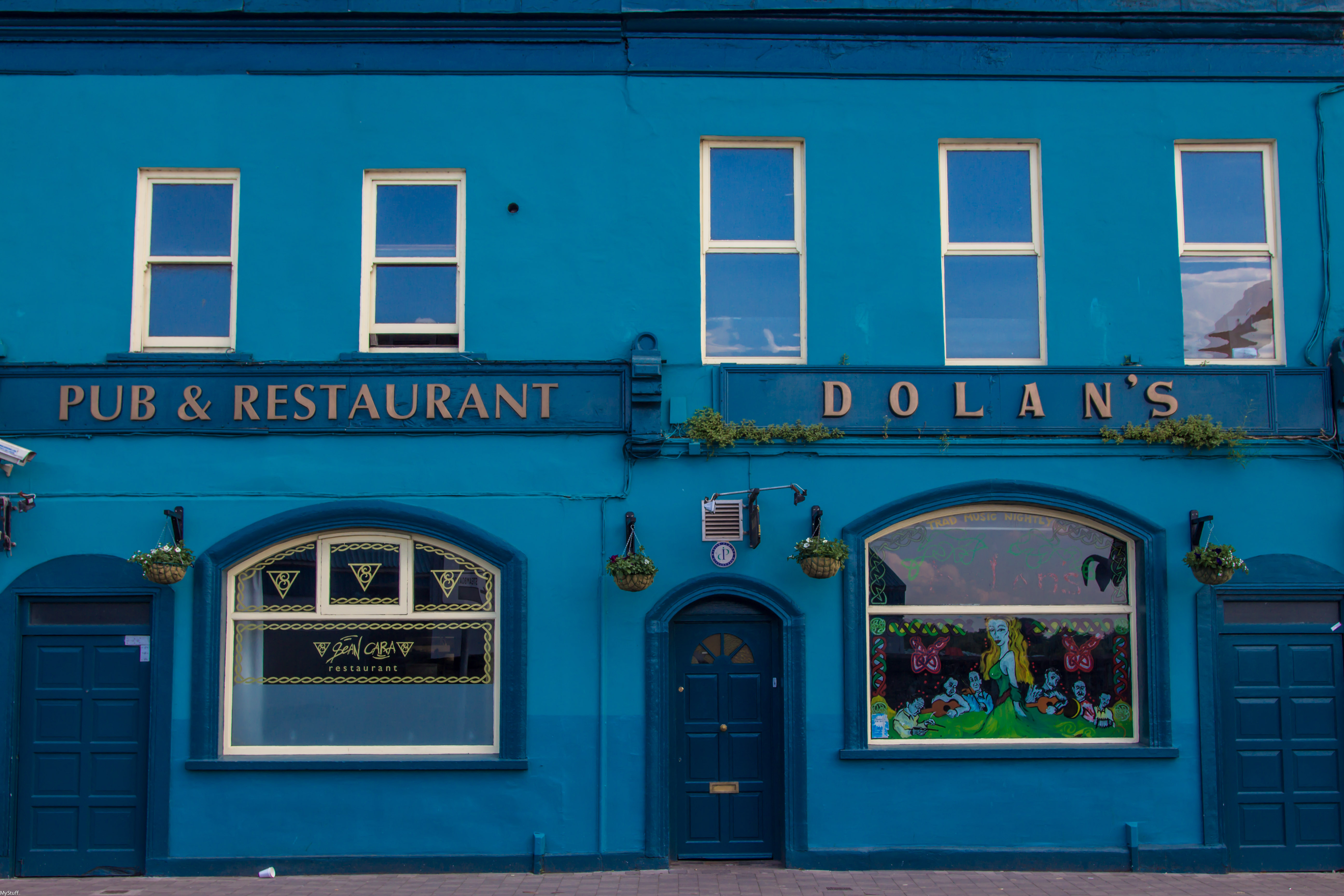
- The front of Dolan's in 2013
- Interactive map of the Dolan's area

General information
- Type: Concert and events venue
- Location: Dock Road, Limerick City, Ireland
- Opening: 1994

Other information
- Seating capacity: 380 (Dolan’s Warehouse); 120 (Upstairs); 120 (Kasbah)

Website
- dolans.ie

Dolan's is a music and entertainment venue and pub in Limerick, Ireland. Situated on the city's Dock Road, it opened as a music venue in 1994. Inside the building is located three separate venues: Dolan's Warehouse, Upstairs and the Kasbah.

The Irish Music Rights Organisation gave Dolans its "Live Music Venue of the Year" award in 2014 and 2015.

Dolan's has also hosted professional wrestling events, such as Over the Top Wrestling shows.

== Notable music acts who have played the venue ==
Mumford & Sons, Franz Ferdinand, The Waterboys, Chic and Kasabian are some notable acts who played at Dolan's.
