= Dolan Township, Cass County, Missouri =

Township in Cass County, Missouri, U.S.

Coordinates: 38.6150°N 94.4972°W

Dolan Township is an inactive township in Cass County, in the U.S. state of Missouri.

Dolan Township has the name of James Dolan, a pioneer settler.
