= Dolenz =

Dolenz is a surname, a phonetic respelling of the Slovene surname Dolenc. Notable people with the surname include:

== People ==
- George Dolenz (1908–1963), American film actor of Slovene origin
  - Janelle Dolenz, born Janelle Johnson, (1923-1995), American film actress, wife of George
- Micky Dolenz (born 1945), son of George and Janelle, American actor, musician, and television and theater director
  - Samantha Dolenz, born Samantha Juste, (1944-2014), wife of Micky, British model and television presenter
- Ami Dolenz (born 1969), daughter of Micky and Samantha, American actress

== Characters ==
- Kevin Dolenz, a character in St. Elmo's Fire

== See also ==
- Dolen (disambiguation)
- Dollens
