= Sedin Alić =

Bosnian-Herzegovinian footballer

Personal information
- Full name: Sedin Alić
- Date of birth: 31 May 1989 (age 37)
- Place of birth: Heijlsminde, Denmark
- Height: 1.71 m (5 ft 7 1/2 in)
- Position: Midfielder

Youth career
- 2004–2006: Christiansfeld IF
- 2006–2008: SønderjyskE

Senior career*
Years	Team	Apps	(Gls)
2008–2009	SønderjyskE	23	(0)
2010–2012	Vejle	25	(1)
2011–2012	→ Hjørring (loan)	13	(1)
2012–2014	Kristianstads	23	(1)
- * Club domestic league appearances and goals

Sedin Alić (born 31 May 1989 in Heijlsminde) is a Bosnian-Herzegovinian professional footballer.

== Club career ==
The Danish-born Alić began his career with Christiansfeld IF and joined in July 2006 to the youth side of SønderjyskE. After one year in the a-youth of SønderjyskE signed his first professional contract for the club and played until December 2009 only 16 games. On 21 January 2010 signed a 2 1/2-year contract for Vejle Boldklub.
