= Doolin (surname) =

Doolin is a surname. Notable people with the surname include:

- Bill Doolin (1858–1896), American outlaw
- Charles Elmer Doolin, potato chips business founder
- James Doolin (1932–2002), American painter
- Lena Doolin Mason (1864–1924), American Methodist preacher and poet
- Mickey Doolin (1880–1951), American baseball player
- Paul Doolin (born 1963), Irish footballer
- William Doolin, American politician
