= Dolina, Łódź Voivodeship =

Dolina
- Settlement
- Location within Poland
- Coordinates: 51°14′9″N 18°20′45″E
- Country: Poland
- Voivodeship: Łódź
- County: Wieruszów
- Gmina: Czastary

Dolina [dɔˈlina] is a settlement in the administrative district of Gmina Czastary, within Wieruszów County, Łódź Voivodeship, in central Poland.
