= Dolina, Zavidovići =

Dolina
- Village
- Location within Bosnia and Herzegovina
- Coordinates: 44.4676631°N 18.1546837°E
- Country: Bosnia and Herzegovina
- Entity: Federation of Bosnia and Herzegovina
- Canton: Zenica-Doboj
- Municipality: Zavidovići

Area
  - Total: 1.08 sq mi (2.80 km^{2})

Population (2013)
  - Total: 521
  - Density: 482/sq mi (186/km^{2})
- Time zone: UTC+1 (CET)
  - Summer (DST): UTC+2 (CEST)

Dolina is a village in the municipality of Zavidovići, Bosnia and Herzegovina. It is located on the western banks of the River Bosna.

== Demographics ==
According to the 2013 census, its population was 521.

Ethnicity in 2013
Ethnicity	Number	Percentage
Bosniaks	439	84.3%
Croats	72	13.8%
other/undeclared	10	1.9%
Total	521	100%
