= Supercard of Honor (2025) =

Ring of Honor professional wrestling event

- Promotional poster featuring various ROH wrestlers
- Promotion: Ring of Honor
- Date: July 11, 2025
- City: Arlington, Texas
- Venue: Esports Stadium Arlington
- Attendance: 1,300

Event chronology
← Previous; Global Wars Mexico	Next → Death Before Dishonor

Supercard of Honor chronology
← Previous; 2024	Next → 2026

The 2025 Supercard of Honor was a professional wrestling live streaming event produced by Ring of Honor (ROH). It was the 18th Supercard of Honor and took place on Friday, July 11, 2025, at Esports Stadium Arlington in Arlington, Texas. The event aired exclusively on ROH's streaming service, Honor Club. The event also featured wrestlers from ROH's sister promotion, All Elite Wrestling (AEW), as part of All In weekend, scheduled for the following day.

Twelve matches were contested at the event, including four on the Zero Hour pre-show. In the event's final match, which was promoted as part of a double main event, Bandido defeated Konosuke Takeshita in a critically acclaimed match to retain the ROH World Championship. The other main event, which was the penultimate match, saw Athena defeat Thunder Rosa to retain the ROH Women's World Championship. In other prominent matches, Mina Shirakawa defeated Miyu Yamashita, Persephone, and Yuka Sakazaki to become the interim ROH Women's World Television Champion, and The Sons of Texas (Dustin Rhodes and Sammy Guevara) defeated The Infantry (Capt. Shawn Dean and Carlie Bravo) to retain the ROH World Tag Team Championship

== Production ==
=== Background ===
Supercard of Honor is a pay-per-view professional wrestling event annually presented by Ring of Honor (ROH), and primarily takes place during the weekend of WrestleMania - the flagship event of WWE, and considered to be the biggest wrestling event of the year. It has been a yearly tradition since 2006. The shows are sometimes two-day events, traditionally taking place on Friday nights and/or Saturday afternoons, and are held either in or nearby the same city as that year's WrestleMania.

In March 2025, it was announced that Supercard of Honor would take place on May 2 on the Adrian Phillips Theater at Boardwalk Hall in Atlantic City, New Jersey, which means that for the first time since 2011, Supercard of Honor will not take place during the weekend of WrestleMania. On April 22, 2025, the event was rescheduled for July 11 at Esports Stadium Arlington in Arlington, Texas, during the week of ROH's sister promotion, All Elite Wrestling's All In event, AEW's biggest event of the year.

=== Storylines ===
The event featured professional wrestling matches that involved different wrestlers from pre-existing scripted feuds and storylines. Wrestlers portrayed villains, heroes, or less distinguishable characters in scripted events that build tension and culminate in a wrestling match or series of matches. Storylines were produced on ROH's weekly series ROH Honor Club TV exclusively on their streaming service Honor Club, on television programs of sister promotion All Elite Wrestling including Dynamite and Collision.

Athena had been feuding with Thunder Rosa weekly leading up to the pay-per-view, as on the June 6 episode of ROH Honor Club TV, Rosa came to the aid of Rachel Armstrong after Athena continued the attack following Armstrong's defeat in a match. Afterwards, while Athena retreated, Rosa held up her ROH Women's World Championship, indicating she was after the title. The following week, Athena cut a promo backstage where she disregarded Rosa as "irrelevant". Both women would then face off in a tag team match at Global Wars Mexico, where Athena team with ROH Women's World Television Champion Red Velvet against Rosa and Persephone; the latter team ended up successful. Following the event, ROH announced that Rosa would challenge Athena for the ROH Women's World Championship at Supercard of Honor.

At Global Wars Mexico, Blue Panther defeated ROH Pure Champion Lee Moriarty in a non-title match, automatically putting him in contention for Lee's title. As such, a championship rematch between the two was announced for Supercard of Honor.

Konosuke Takeshita put a challenge out for Bandido's ROH World Championship during a backstage segment at Global Wars Mexico, where it was later announced that a title match between the two was scheduled for Supercard of Honor.

On the July 3 episode of ROH Honor Club TV, The Infantry (Capt. Shawn Dean and Carlie Bravo) defeated Top Flight (Dante Martin and Darius Martin) in a ROH World Tag Team Championship number one contender's match. The following day, ROH announced that they would face champions The Sons of Texas (Dustin Rhodes and Sammy Guevara) for the titles at Supercard of Honor.

At Global Wars Mexico, ROH World Television Champion Nick Wayne faced Titán in a Proving Ground match that ended in a time limit draw. Due to the nature of Proving Ground matches, however, this would earn Titán a future title match. On July 7, it was announced that the two would have a rematch for the title at Supercard of Honor.

On July 7, it was announced that ROH Women's World Television Champion Red Velvet had been injured and would not be competing at Supercard of Honor; therefore, a match to determine an interim champion was scheduled for the event. Hours before the event, it was announced that the match would be a "Worldwide Women's Wild Card" four-way match, with the participants later confirmed to be Mina Shirakawa, Miyu Yamashita, Persephone, and Yuka Sakazaki, and the winner would face Velvet at a later date to crown the undisputed champion.

==== Cancelled match ====
On April 12, after a taping of AEW Collision, Tony Khan introduced the ROH Women's Pure Championship to the ROH women's division. The inaugural champion will be crowned via a sixteen-woman single-elimination tournament. It was originally announced that the finals would happen at Supercard of Honor, but due to timing issues, the inaugural title match was postponed to a later date.

== Reception ==
Reviewing the event for the Wrestling Observer Newsletter, Dave Meltzer positively reviewed the event. For the pre-show, he gave the Blake Christian/Jay Lethal bout 2.75 stars, the six-man tag team match 3 stars, and the Diamante/Frost match and tag match between The Von Erichs and The Premier Athletes both 2 stars. For the main show, he gave the singles bout between Hechicero and Michael Oku 4 stars, the $50,000 four-way match 3.75 stars, the ROH Pure Championship bout 4 stars, the ROH World Tag Team Championship bout 3.75 stars, the ROH World Television Championship match 4.5 stars, the interim ROH Women's World Television Championship match 3.75 stars, the ROH Women's World Championship match 4 stars, and the ROH World Championship match between Bandido and Takeshita 5.75 stars, the highest of the night, and as of July 24th, 2025 was Meltzer's highest score of the year.

== Results ==
No.	Results	Stipulations	Times
1^{P}	Blake Christian (with Lee Johnson) defeated Jay Lethal by submission	Singles match	8:08
2^{P}	The Dark Order (Alex Reynolds, Evil Uno, and John Silver) defeated The Frat House (Cole Karter, Griff Garrison, and Preston Vance) (with Jacked Jameson) by pinfall	Six-man tag team match	10:30
3^{P}	Diamanté defeated Lady Frost by pinfall	Singles match	6:00
4^{P}	The Von Erichs (Ross Von Erich and Marshall Von Erich) defeated The Premier Athletes (Ariya Daivari and Tony Nese) (with "Smart" Mark Sterling) by pinfall	Tag team match	8:42
5	Hechicero (with Rocky Romero) defeated Michael Oku (with Amira Blair) by pinfall	Singles match	11:29
6	AR Fox defeated Adam Priest, Atlantis Jr., and Lee Johnson by pinfall	$50,000 Reward four-way match	9:12
7	Lee Moriarty (c) defeated Blue Panther by submission	Pure Wrestling Rules match for the ROH Pure Championship	13:15
8	The Sons of Texas (Dustin Rhodes and Sammy Guevara) (c) defeated The Infantry (Carlie Bravo and Capt. Shawn Dean) (with Trish Adora) by pinfall	Tag team match for the ROH World Tag Team Championship	15:04
9	Nick Wayne (c) (with Mother Wayne) defeated Titán by pinfall	Singles match for the ROH World Television Championship	16:10
10	Mina Shirakawa defeated Miyu Yamashita, Persephone, and Yuka Sakazaki by submission	"Worldwide Women's Wild Card" four-way match for the interim ROH Women's World Television Championship	13:45
11	Athena (c) (with Billie Starkz) defeated Thunder Rosa by submission	Singles match for the ROH Women's World Championship	18:49
12	Bandido (c) defeated Konosuke Takeshita by pinfall	Singles match for the ROH World Championship	29:23
(c) / – the champion(s) heading into the match; P / – the match was broadcast on the pre-show

== See also ==
- All In (2025)
- List of Ring of Honor pay-per-view and livestreaming events
