= The Infantry (professional wrestling) =

Professional wrestling stable

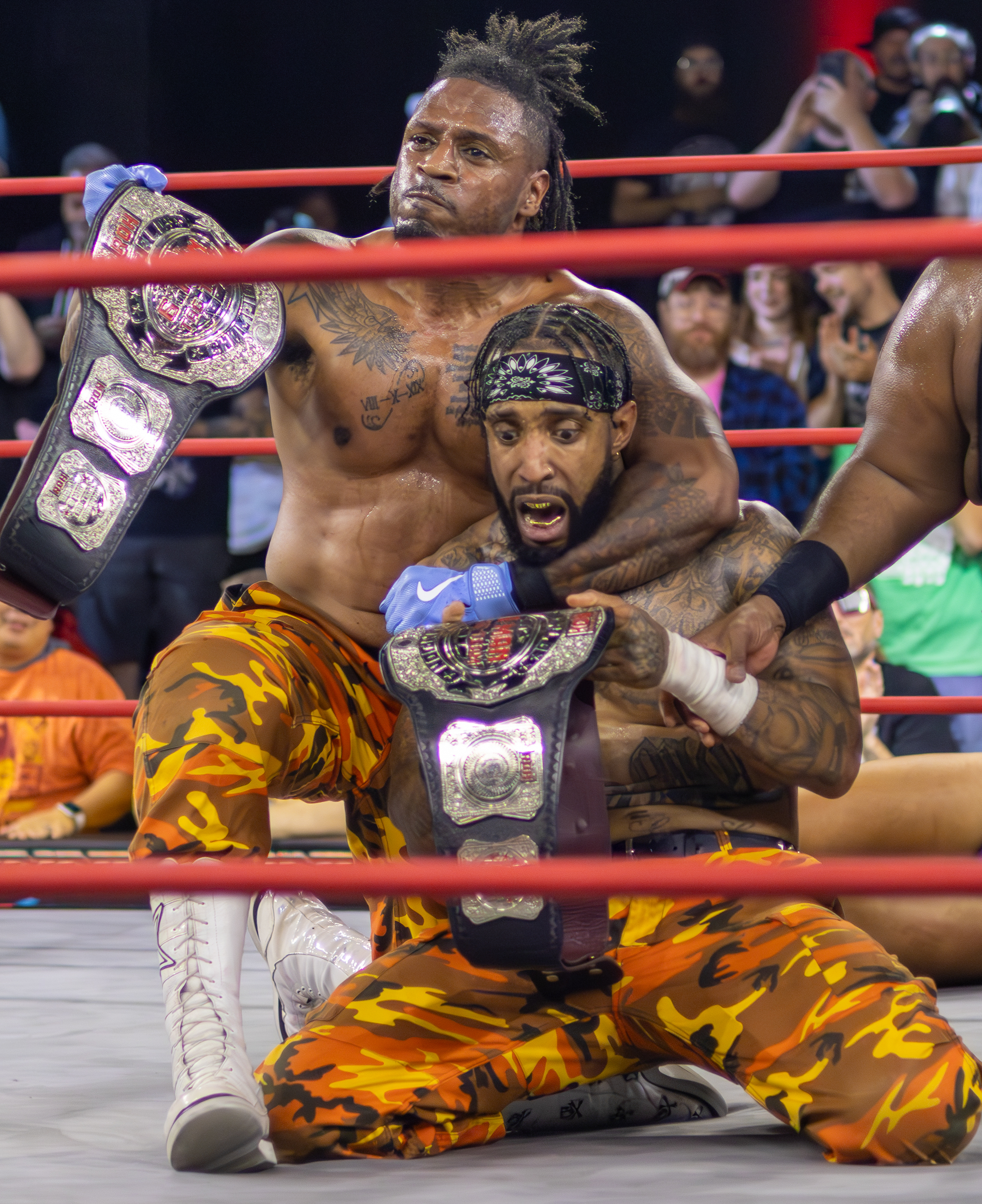
- Capt. Shawn Dean (left) and Carlie Bravo (right) as two-thirds of the ROH World Six-Man Tag Team Champion in 2025

Stable
- Name: The Infantry
- Members: Carlie Bravo; Capt. Shawn Dean; Trish Adora; Christyan XO (valet)
- Debut: March 3, 2023
- Years active: 2021; 2023–present

The Infantry is an American professional wrestling stable in Ring of Honor (ROH) and All Elite Wrestling (AEW), where they are a sub-group of Shane Taylor Promotions. The team consists of Carlie Bravo, Capt. Shawn Dean, Trish Adora, and Christyan XO, who serves as their valet; the team name comes from the fact that Bravo, Dean and Adora are veterans of the United States Armed Services.

== History ==
=== Ring of Honor / All Elite Wrestling (2021–present) ===
==== Early beginnings (2021–2024) ====
In on March 3, 2023 The Infantry made their debut in Ring of Honor on the inaugural episode of ROH on Honor Club, facing The Kingdom but in a losing effort. On the June 22 episode of ROH on Honor Club, The Infantry earned their first win as a team when they defeated The Kingdom after help from Trish Adora who became the third member of The Infantry. On the July 6 episode of ROH, Dean and Bravo teamed with Adora in a six person tag team match, where they were defeated by The Kingdom and Leyla Hirsch. On the September 21 episode of ROH, The Infantry teamed with Willie Mack to challenge for the ROH World Six Man Tag Team Titles against Brian Cage, Bishop Kaun and Toa Liona of Mogul Embassy but were unsuccessful in capturing the titles.

On February 14, 2024, The Infantry’s Trish Adora entered the inaugural ROH Women's World Television Championship tournament against Mercedes Martinez but lost to her in the first round. As of March 2024, The Infantry including Adora began making appearances on AEW. On the March 9, 2024 episode of AEW Collision, The Infantry confronted FTR and teased the possibility of facing FTR in the tournament for the vacant AEW World Tag Team Titles as both teams shook hands and showed respect to one another. The following week on Collision, The Infantry defeated Brody King and Buddy Matthews of House of Black thanks to help from Mark Briscoe, earning their first televised win as a team and qualifying for the AEW World Tag Team Title tournament. They fought FTR in the quarter-finals of the tournament on the March 30th episode of Collision but were defeated. At Supercard of Honor, The Infantry took on The Undisputed Kingdom (Matt Taven and Mike Bennett) for the ROH World Tag Team Championship but were unsuccessful. At Death Before Dishonor, The Infantry (with Trish Adora) defeated Griff Garrison and Anthony Henry (with Maria Kanellis) in a tag team match.

==== Shane Taylor Promotions (2024–present) ====
On the October 31, 2024 episode of ROH Wrestling, The Infantry joined Shane Taylor Promotions. On December 20, 2024 at Final Battle 2024 The Infantry with Trish Adora and Shane Taylor in their corner once more had a match against The Undisputed Kingdom but was unsuccessful. At Death Before Dishonor on August 29, 2025, The Infantry and Shane Taylor defeated Sons of Texas (Sammy Guevara, Marshall Von Erich and Ross Von Erich) to win the ROH World Six-Man Tag Team Championship. At Final Battle in December 2025, Shane Taylor Promotions successfully defended the ROH World Six-Man Championship against SkyFlight (Dante Martin, Darius Martin, and Scorpio Sky).

On the January 29, 2026 episode of ROH, Carlie Bravo introduced newest member Christyan XO to The Infantry. On May 15, 2026 at Supercard of Honor The Infantry and Shane Taylor lost the Six-man tag team match for the ROH World Six-Man Tag Team Championship to Dalton Castle and The Outrunners (Truth Magnum and Turbo Floyd).

== Championships and accomplishments ==
- Adrenaline Championship Wrestling
  - ACW Fire Woman's Championship (1 time) – Christyan XO
- 4th Rope Wrestling
  - 4th Rope Tag Team Championship (1 time, current) – Bravo and Dean
- Ring of Honor
  - ROH World Six-Man Tag Team Championship (1 time) – Bravo and Dean with Shane Taylor
