= List of ROH World Six-Man Tag Team Champions =

The ROH World Six-Man Tag Team Championship is a professional wrestling world tag team championship owned by the Ring of Honor (ROH) promotion. Like most professional wrestling championships, the title is won as a result of a professional wrestling match with a predetermined outcome.

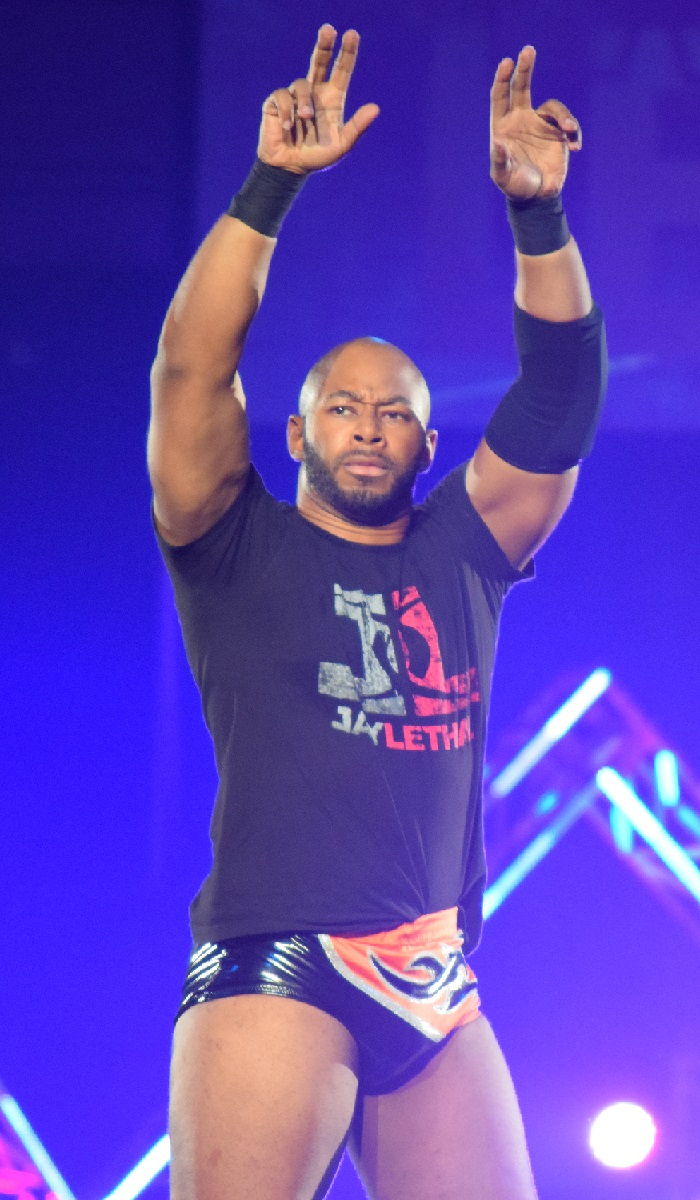
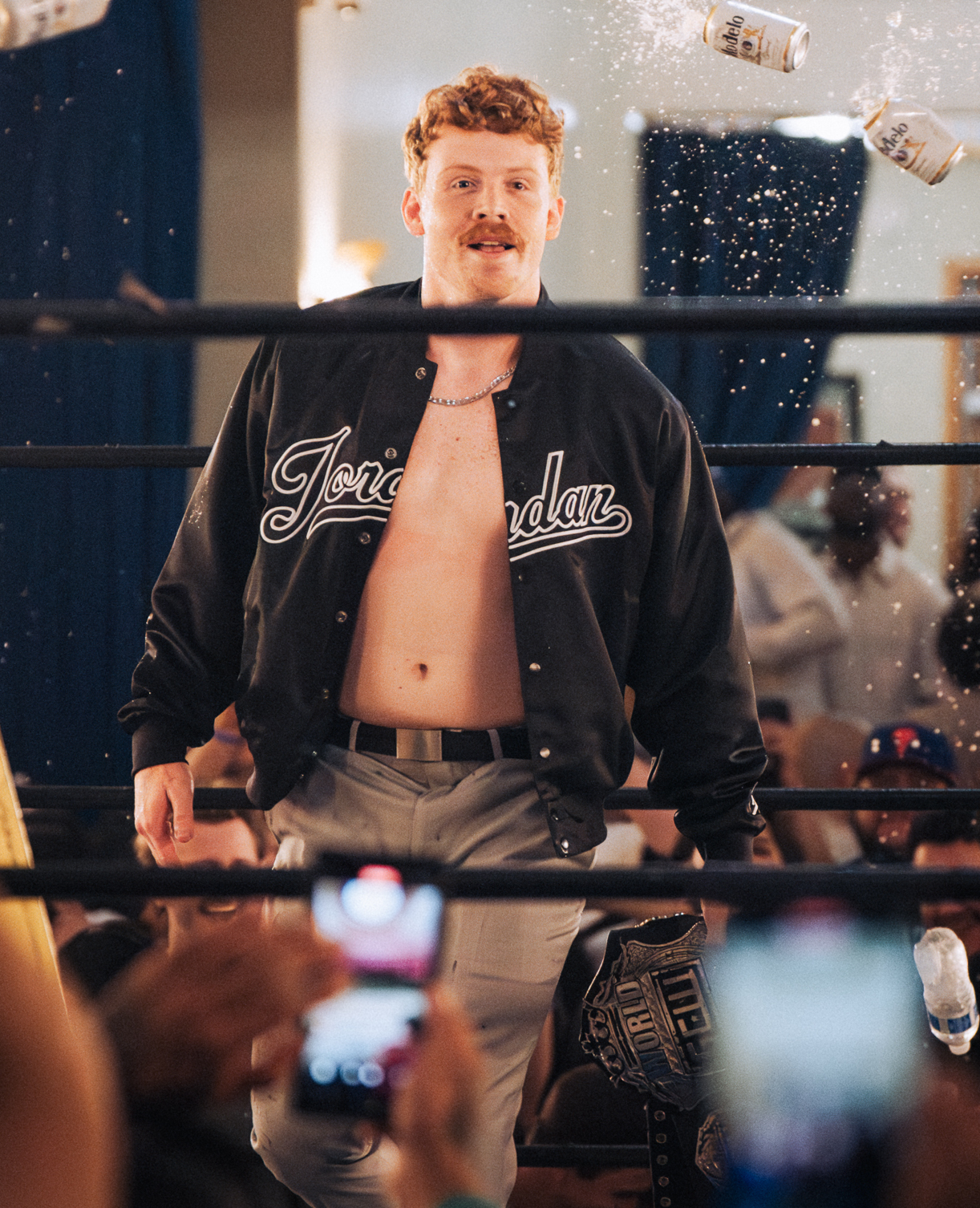
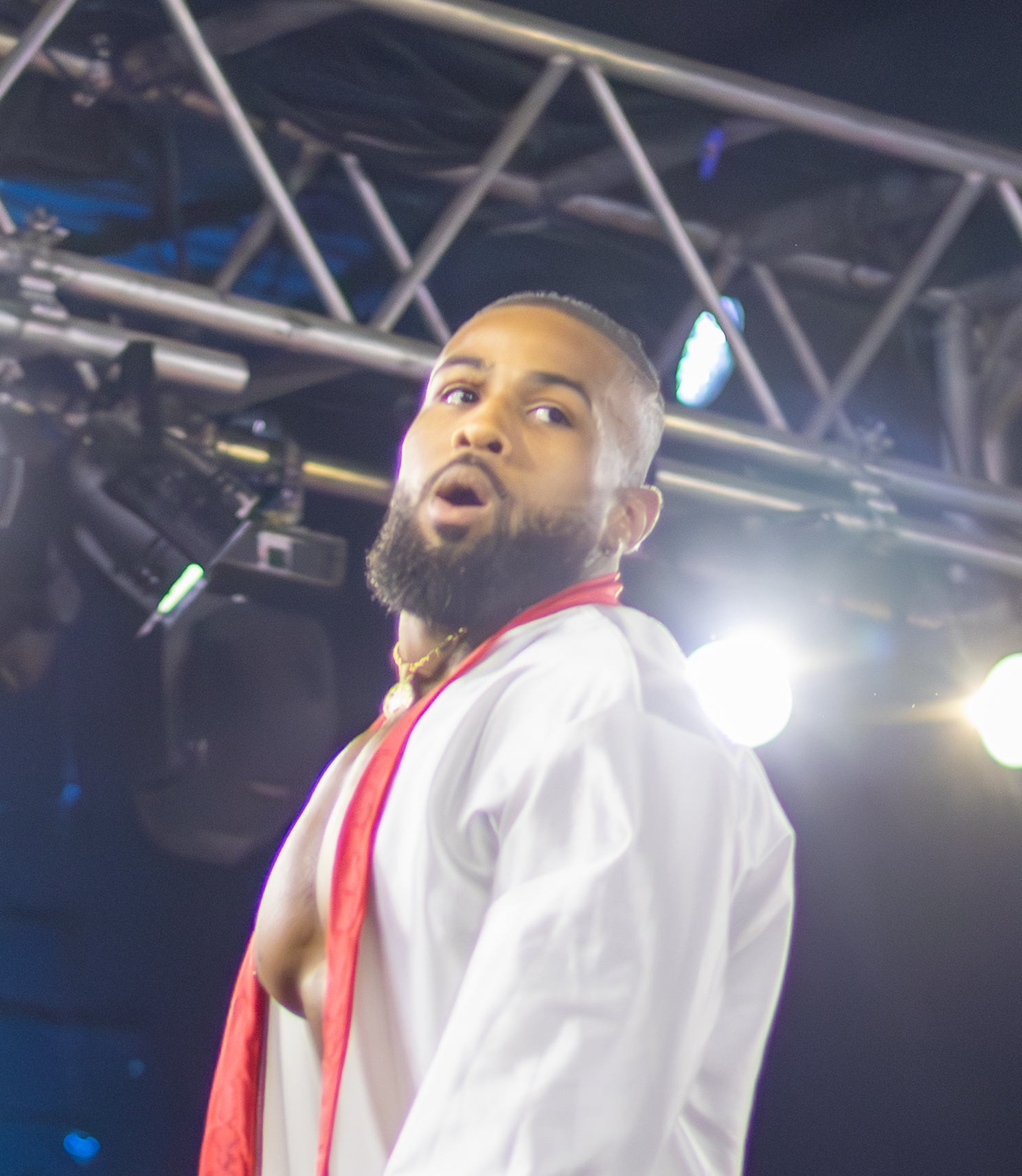
Current champions (from left to right) Jay Lethal, Blake Christian and Lee Johnson.

There have been 21 reigns between 16 teams composed of 42 individual wrestlers, and two vacancies. The Kingdom (Matt Taven, T. K. O'Ryan, and Vinny Marseglia) were the inaugural champions and they have the most reigns as a team at three, while individually, Vinny has the most reigns at four (by the time of his fourth reign, his ring name was changed to Vincent).

The current champions are The Lethal Twist (Jay Lethal, Blake Christian, and Lee Johnson), who are in their first reign as a team and individually. They won the title by defeating Dalton Castle and The Outrunners (Turbo Floyd and Truth Magnum) at Death Before Dishonor in Philadelphia, Pennsylvania, on August 21, 2026.

== Title history ==
=== Names ===
Name	Years
ROH World Six-Man Tag Team Championship	December 2, 2016 – present
Unified World Trios Championship	April 21, 2024 – July 13, 2024

=== Reigns ===
Key
No.	Overall reign number
Reign	Reign number for the specific team—reign numbers for the individuals are in parentheses, if different
Days	Number of days held
+	Current reign is changing daily

No.	Champion	Championship change			Reign statistics		Notes	Ref.
No.	Champion	Date	Event	Location	Reign	Days	Notes	Ref.
Ring of Honor (ROH)
1	The Kingdom (Matt Taven, T. K. O'Ryan, and Vinny Marseglia)	December 2, 2016	Final Battle	New York City, NY	1	99	Defeated Jay White, Kushida, and Lio Rush in the finals of an eight-team tournament to become the inaugural champions.	
2	Bully Ray and The Briscoe Brothers (Jay Briscoe, and Mark Briscoe)	March 11, 2017	Ring of Honor Wrestling	Las Vegas, NV	1	104	Silas Young filled in for an injured T. K. O'Ryan. This episode aired on tape delay on April 11, 2017.	
3	Dalton Castle and The Boys (Boy 1 and Boy 2)	June 23, 2017	Best in the World	Lowell, MA	1	58		
4	The Hung Bucks (Adam Page, Matt Jackson, and Nick Jackson)	August 20, 2017	War of the Worlds UK	Edinburgh, Scotland	1	201	While The Hung Bucks were the official champions, other Bullet Club members were allowed to defend the title under "Bullet Club Rules."	
5	SoCal Uncensored (Christopher Daniels, Frankie Kazarian, and Scorpio Sky)	March 9, 2018	ROH 16th Anniversary Show	Las Vegas, NV	1	61	This was a Las Vegas Street Fight.	
6	The Kingdom (Matt Taven, T. K. O'Ryan, and Vinny Marseglia)	May 9, 2018	War of the Worlds Tour	Lowell, MA	2	73		
7	Bullet Club/The Elite (Cody, Matt Jackson, and Nick Jackson)	July 21, 2018	Ring of Honor Wrestling	Atlanta, GA	1 (1, 2, 2)	106	During this reign, Cody and The Young Bucks (along with others) broke away from Bullet Club and named their group The Elite.	
8	The Kingdom (Matt Taven, T. K. O'Ryan, and Vinny Marseglia)	November 4, 2018	Survival of the Fittest	Columbus, OH	3	132		
9	Villain Enterprises (Brody King, Marty Scurll, and PCO)	March 16, 2019	Ring of Honor Wrestling	Sunrise Manor, NV	1	301		
10	MexiSquad (Bandido, Flamita, and Rey Horus)	January 11, 2020	Saturday Night at Center Stage	Atlanta, GA	1	405	Flip Gordon wrestled in place of PCO for Villain Enterprises during this match due to PCO defending the ROH World Championship later in the night.	
11	Shane Taylor Promotions (Moses, Kaun, and Shane Taylor)	February 19, 2021	Ring of Honor Wrestling	Baltimore, MD	1	295	Aired on tape delay on February 20, 2021.	
12	The Righteous (Bateman, Dutch, and Vincent)	December 11, 2021	Final Battle	Baltimore, MD	1 (1, 1, 4)	224	Vincent was previously known as Vinny Marseglia. O'Shay Edwards filled in for Shane Taylor, who had a match against Kenny King later in the night. During this reign, Tony Khan purchased Ring of Honor.	
13	Dalton Castle and The Boys (Brandon Tate and Brent Tate)	July 23, 2022	Death Before Dishonor	Lowell, MA	2	140	Brandon and Brent were previously known as Boy 1 and Boy 2, respectively.	
14	Embassy/Mogul Embassy (Brian Cage, Bishop Kaun, and Toa Liona)	December 10, 2022	Final Battle	Arlington, TX	1 (1, 2, 1)	284	The group was renamed to Mogul Embassy during this reign after Swerve Strickland joined the stable.	
15	The Elite ("Hangman" Adam Page, Matt Jackson, and Nick Jackson)	September 20, 2023	Rampage: Grand Slam	Flushing, Queens, NY	2 (2, 3, 3)	42	This was an All Elite Wrestling event. Previously held the title as The Hung Bucks. This episode aired on tape delay on September 22, 2023.	
16	Mogul Embassy (Brian Cage, Bishop Kaun, and Toa Liona)	November 1, 2023	Dynamite	Louisville, KY	2 (2, 3, 2)	77	This was an All Elite Wrestling event.	
17	Bullet Club Gold/Bang Bang Gang (Jay White, Austin Gunn, and Colten Gunn)	January 17, 2024	Dynamite	North Charleston, SC	1	175	This was an All Elite Wrestling (AEW) event. At Dynasty: Zero Hour on April 21, 2024, Bullet Club Gold defeated The Acclaimed (Anthony Bowens, Max Caster, and Billy Gunn) in a winner takes all championship unification match for the AEW World Trios Championship to unify the titles as the Unified World Trios Championship. The group was renamed to Bang Bang Gang during this reign.	
—	Vacated	July 10, 2024	Collision	—	—	—	This was an All Elite Wrestling (AEW) event. Bang Bang Gang were stripped of the Unified World Trios Championship by interim AEW Executive Vice President Christopher Daniels after Jay White suffered an injury, overruling Bang Bang Gang's attempt to invoke the Freebird Rule to allow Juice Robinson to defend the title in place of White. This also ended the unification with the AEW World Trios Championship. This episode aired on tape delay on July 13, 2024.	
18	The Sons of Texas (Dustin Rhodes, Marshall Von Erich, and Ross Von Erich)	July 27, 2024	Battle of the Belts XI	Arlington, TX	1	398	This was an All Elite Wrestling event. Defeated The Undisputed Kingdom (Roderick Strong, Matt Taven, and Mike Bennett) to win the vacant championship.	
—	Vacated	August 28, 2025	Ring of Honor Wrestling	Cleveland, OH	—	—	Sons of Texas vacated the titles due to Dustin undergoing double knee replacement surgery. Aired on tape delay on August 28, 2025.	
19	Shane Taylor Promotions (Shane Taylor, Carlie Bravo, and Capt. Shawn Dean)	August 29, 2025	Death Before Dishonor	Philadelphia, PA	1 (2,1,1)	259	Defeated Sons of Texas (Sammy Guevara, Marshall Von Erich, and Ross Von Erich) to win the vacant titles.	
20	Dalton Castle and The Outrunners (Truth Magnum and Turbo Floyd)	May 15, 2026	Supercard of Honor	Salisbury, MD	1 (3,1,1)	97	This was an open challenge.	
21	The Lethal Twist (Jay Lethal, Blake Christian, and Lee Johnson)	August 21, 2026	Death Before Dishonor	Philadelphia, PA	1	61+		

== Combined reigns ==
As of October 21, 2026.

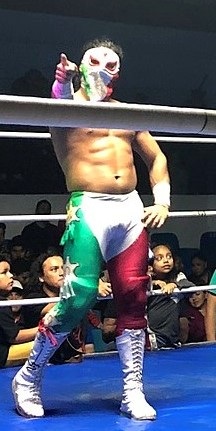
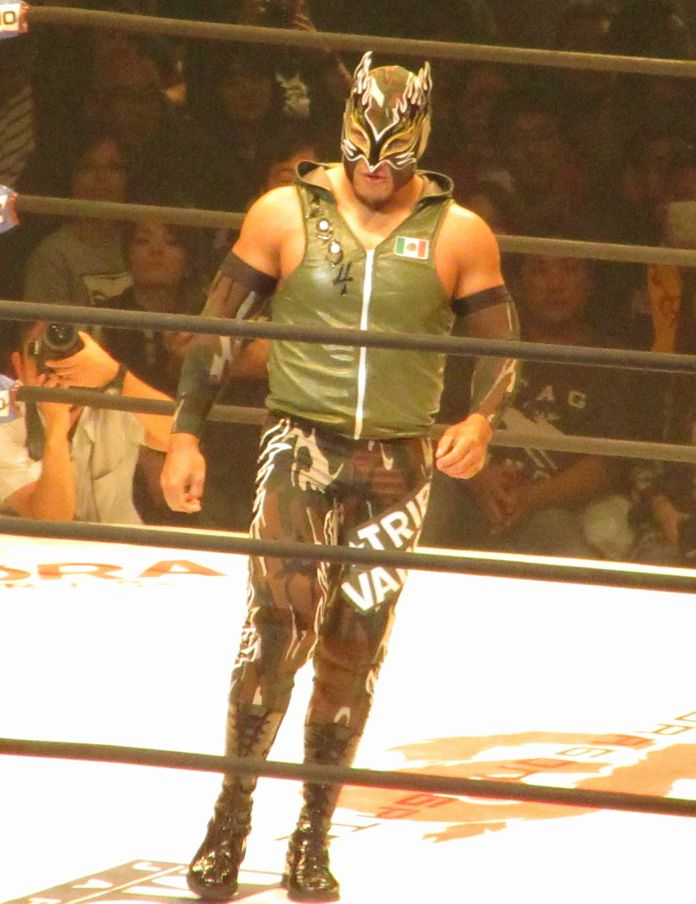
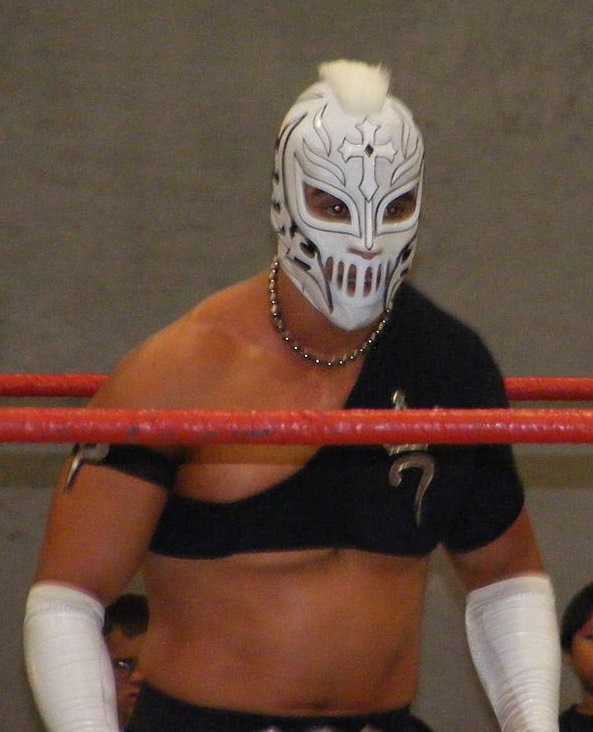
Longest reigning champions MexiSquad (Bandido, Flamita, and Rey Horus).

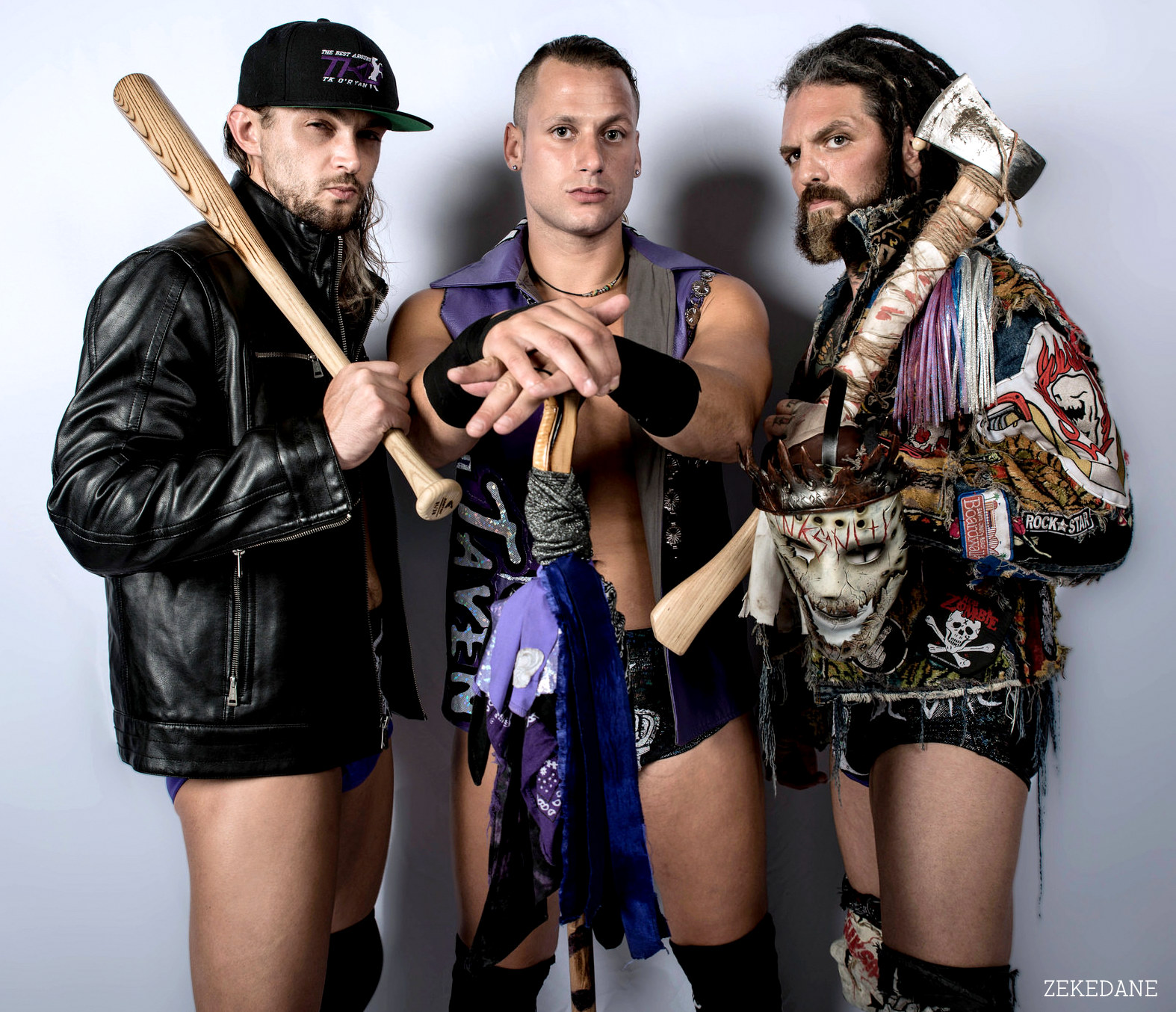
Record three-time and inaugural champions, The Kingdom (left to right: T. K. O'Ryan Matt Taven, and Vinny Marseglia).

†	Indicates the current champion
¤	The exact length of at least one title reign is uncertain.

=== By team ===
Rank	Team	No. of reigns	Combined days
1	MexiSquad (Bandido, Flamita, and Rey Horus)	1	405
2	The Sons of Texas (Dustin Rhodes, Marshall Von Erich, and Ross Von Erich)	1	398
3	Embassy/Mogul Embassy (Brian Cage, Bishop Kaun, and Toa Liona)	2	361
4	The Kingdom (Matt Taven, T. K. O'Ryan, and Vinny Marseglia)	3	304
5	Villain Enterprises (Brody King, Marty Scurll, and PCO)	1	301
6	Shane Taylor Promotions (Moses, Kaun, and Shane Taylor)	1	295
7	Shane Taylor Promotions (Shane Taylor, Carlie Bravo, and Capt. Shawn Dean)	1	259
8	The Elite/The Hung Bucks (Adam Page, Matt Jackson, and Nick Jackson)	2	243
9	The Righteous (Bateman, Dutch, and Vincent)	1	224
10	Dalton Castle and The Boys (Boy 1/Brandon Tate and Boy 2/Brent Tate)	2	198
11	Bullet Club Gold/Bang Bang Gang (Jay White, Austin Gunn, and Colten Gunn)	1	175
12	Bullet Club/The Elite (Cody, Matt Jackson, and Nick Jackson)	1	106
13	Bully Ray and The Briscoes (Jay Briscoe and Mark Briscoe)	1	104
14	Dalton Castle and The Outrunners (Turbo Floyd and Truth Magnum)	1	97
15	The Lethal Twist † (Jay Lethal, Blake Christian, and Lee Johnson)	1	61+
16	SoCal Uncensored (Christopher Daniels, Frankie Kazarian, and Scorpio Sky)	1	61

=== By wrestler ===
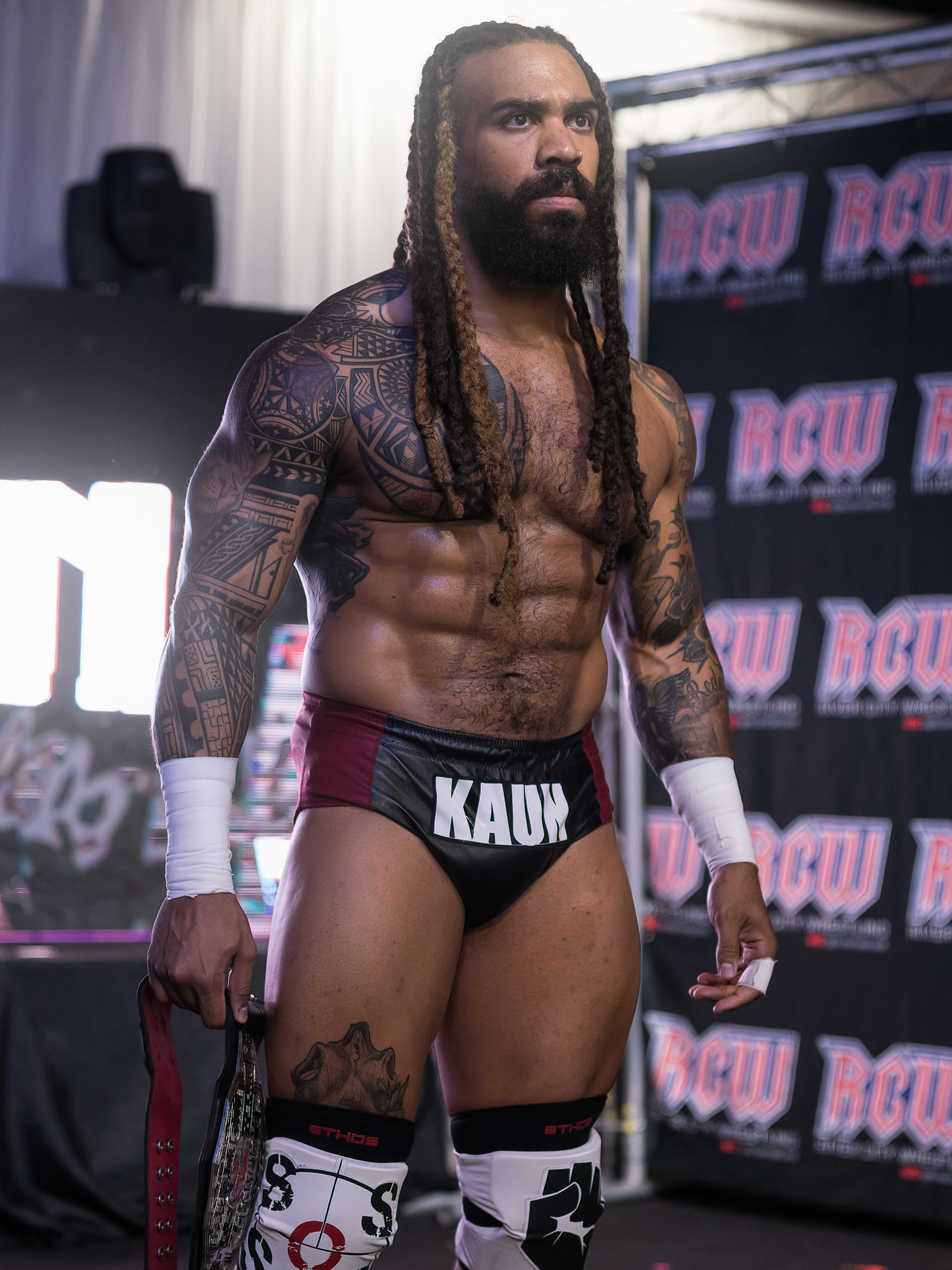
Kaun/Bishop Kaun holds the record for most combined days as champion at 656 days.

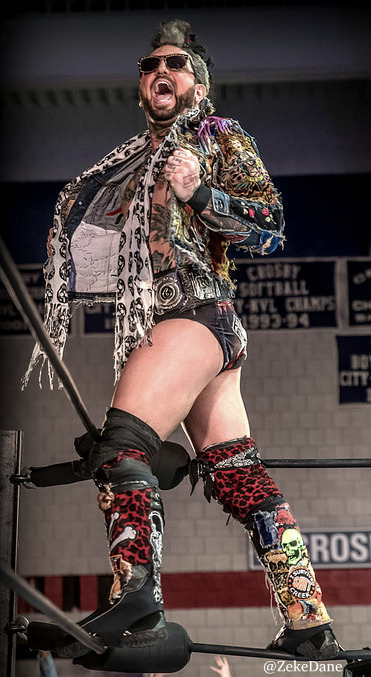
Vinny Marseglia/Vincent has the most reigns as an individual at four.

Rank	Wrestler	No. of reigns	Combined days
1	Kaun/Bishop Kaun	3	656
2	Shane Taylor	2	555
3	Vinny Marseglia/Vincent	4	528
4	Bandido	1	405
4	Flamita	1	405
4	Rey Horus	1	405
7	Dustin Rhodes	1	398
7	Marshall Von Erich	1	398
7	Ross Von Erich	1	398
10	Brian Cage	2	361
10	Toa Liona	2	361
12	Matt Jackson	3	349
12	Nick Jackson	3	349
14	Matt Taven	3	304
14	T. K. O'Ryan	3	304
16	Brody King	1	301
16	Marty Scurll	1	301
16	PCO	1	301
19	Moses	1	295
20	Dalton Castle	3	295
21	Carlie Bravo	1	259
21	Capt. Shawn Dean	1	259
23	Adam Page	2	243
24	Bateman	1	224
24	Dutch	1	224
26	Boy 1/Brandon Tate	2	198
26	Boy 2/Brent Tate	2	198
28	Jay White	1	175
28	Austin Gunn	1	175
28	Colten Gunn	1	175
31	Cody	1	106
32	Bully Ray	1	104
32	Jay Briscoe	1	104
32	Mark Briscoe	1	104
35	Turbo Floyd	1	97
35	Truth Magnum	1	97
37	Jay Lethal †	1	61+
37	Blake Christian †	1	61+
37	Lee Johnson †	1	61+
40	Christopher Daniels	1	61
40	Frankie Kazarian	1	61
40	Scorpio Sky	1	61
