= Dutch (wrestler) =

American professional wrestler (born 1987)

Personal information
- Born: William Carr; April 21, 1987 (age 39) Newburgh, New York, U.S.

Professional wrestling career
- Ring names: Bill Carr; Bobby Dutch; Dutch; William
- Billed height: 6 ft 4 in (193 cm)
- Billed weight: 284 lb (129 kg)
- Billed from: Brooklyn, New York
- Trained by: Tony Devito; Steve Keirn; Tom Prichard; Norman Smiley
- Debut: January 9, 2010

William Carr (born April 21, 1987), better known by the ring name Dutch, is an American professional wrestler. He is signed to TNA Wrestling, where he is a member of The Righteous alongside Vincent and Xia. He is known for his time All Elite Wrestling (AEW) and Ring of Honor (ROH), where he is a former ROH World Six-Man Tag Team Champion.

== Professional wrestling career ==
Dan Barry formed Tremendous Investigations Inc. alongside Bill Carr and later adopted the name Team Tremendous. In 2014, Tremendous Investigations Inc. debuted for Combat Zone Wrestling defeating Milk Chocolate. Team Tremendous defeated The Young Bucks, The Beaver Boys, and then champions, O14K, at New Heights in 2015 to become the CZW Tag Team Champions for the first time. They successfully defended their belts against The Dollhouse (Marti Bell and Jade). Barry and Sozio (replacement for Carr) lost the CZW tag team titles to #TVReady (BLK Jeez and Pepper Parks).

On December 11, 2021, at Final Battle, The Righteous defeated Shane Taylor Promotions (Kaun, Moses and O'Shay Edwards) to win the ROH World Six-Man Tag Team Championship. They lost the titles to Dalton Castle and The Boys on July 23, 2022, at Death Before Dishonor.

On March 31, 2023, at Supercard of Honor, Vincent and Dutch returned to the promotion, confronting Evil Uno and Stu Grayson to close out Zero Hour. On the September 22 episode of Dynamite, Dutch and Vincent won a four-way tag team match to earn a shot for the ROH World Tag Team Championship match at WrestleDream. At WrestleDream, however, they lost to MJF in a 2-on-1 Handicap match. In May 2025, Dutch and Vincent left AEW/ROH.

Dutch, alongside his partner, the returning Vincent from Honor No More, made his TNA debut at TNA Final Resolution confronting The Hardys.

== Championships and accomplishments ==
- Combat Zone Wrestling
  - CZW World Tag Team Championship (1 time) – with Dan Barry
- Fight The World Wrestling
  - FTW World Tag Team Championship (1 time) – with Jim Sullivan
- Inter Species Wrestling
  - ISW Tag Team Championship (2 times) – with Dan Barry
- Ring of Honor
  - ROH World Six-Man Tag Team Championship (1 time) – with Vincent and Bateman
- New York Wrestling Connection
  - NYWC Tag Team Championship (2 times) – with Dan Barry (1), and Smith James (1)
- The Wrestling Revolver
  - PWR Tag Team Championship (1 time) – with Dan Barry
