= Supercard of Honor (2026) =

Ring of Honor professional wrestling event

- Promotional poster featuring various ROH and AEW wrestlers
- Promotion: Ring of Honor
- Date: May 15, 2026
- City: Salisbury, Maryland
- Venue: Wicomico Youth and Civic Center
- Attendance: 1,367

Event chronology
← Previous; Global Wars Canada	Next → Death Before Dishonor

Supercard of Honor chronology
← Previous; 2025	Next → —

The 2026 Supercard of Honor was a professional wrestling live streaming event produced by Ring of Honor (ROH). It was the 19th Supercard of Honor and took place on Friday, May 15, 2026, at the Wicomico Youth and Civic Center in Salisbury, Maryland. The event aired exclusively on ROH's streaming service, Honor Club.

Thirteen matches were contested at the event, including four on the Zero-Hour pre-show. In the main event, Athena (c) defeated Maya World, Trish Adora, Yuka Sakazaki, Billie Starkz, and Zayda Steel in the inaugural Women's Survival of the Fittest match to retain the ROH Women's World Championship. In other prominent matches, Bandido defeated Blake Christian to retain the ROH World Championship, and Dalton Castle and The Outrunners (Turbo Floyd and Truth Magnum) defeated Shane Taylor Promotions (Shane Taylor, Carlie Bravo, and Capt. Shawn Dean) to win the ROH World Six-Man Tag Team Championship. The event also featured the return of The Kingdom (Matt Taven and Mike Bennett).

== Production ==
=== Background ===
Supercard of Honor is a pay-per-view professional wrestling event annually presented by Ring of Honor (ROH). It primarily takes place during the weekend of WrestleMania - the flagship event of WWE, and is considered to be the biggest wrestling event of the year. It has been a yearly tradition since 2006. The shows are sometimes two-day events, traditionally taking place on Friday nights and/or Saturday afternoons. They are held either in or near the same city as that year's WrestleMania.

On March 27, 2026, during Global Wars Canada, it was revealed that the 2026 edition of Supercard of Honor would be held on May 15, at the Wicomico Youth and Civic Center in Salisbury, Maryland. This marks the second consecutive year that the event would not be held during WrestleMania weekend.

=== Storylines ===
Other on-screen personnel
Role:	Name:
Commentators	Ian Riccaboni
Commentators	Caprice Coleman

The event features professional wrestling matches that involved different wrestlers from pre-existing scripted feuds and storylines. Wrestlers portrayed villains, heroes, or less distinguishable characters in scripted events that build tension and culminate in a wrestling match or series of matches. Storylines were produced on ROH's weekly series ROH Honor Club TV exclusively on their streaming service Honor Club, on television programs of sister promotion All Elite Wrestling including Dynamite and Collision.

At the April 6, 2026, taping of ROH Honor Club TV, ROH President Tony Khan announced the first-ever women’s Survival of the Fittest tournament for Supercard of Honor. Five qualifying matches took place at the taping, with the winners going on to the finals to challenge Athena for the ROH Women's World Championship. In the five Survival of the Fittest qualifying matches, Maya World defeated Robyn Renegade, Trish Adora defeated Hyan, Yuka Sakazaki defeated Viva Van, Billie Starkz defeated Lacey Lane, and Persephone defeated Isla Dawn. All five women would advance to the final at Supercard of Honor to challenge Athena for her title. However, a month later, on May 3, it was announced that Persephone was pulled from Supercard of Honor due to an apparent injury after a match on April 25's "Playoff Palooza" episode of AEW Collision. A last-chance qualifying match was held on the "Supercard Showdown" edition of ROH Honor Club TV the day before Supercard of Honor, where Zayda Steel defeated Hyan to earn Persephone's spot in the match.

Also on the "Supercard Showdown" edition of ROH Honor Club TV, AR Fox defeated Nick Wayne to win the ROH World Television Championship, but shortly after, Lio Rush appeared on the video board with a simple message: "Tomorrow." It was then announced that Fox will be defending his newly won championship against Rush at Supercard of Honor.

== Results ==
No.	Results	Stipulations	Times
1^{P}	Sammy Guevara defeated Action Andretti by pinfall	Singles match	11:27
2^{P}	Rush defeated LSG by pinfall	Singles match	0:41
3^{P}	Mina Shirakawa and Queen Aminata defeated Janai Kai and Lacey Lane by submission	Tag team match	7:41
4^{P}	The Rascalz (Dezmond Xavier and Myron Reed) (with Zachary Wentz) defeated Premier Athletes (Ari Daivari and Tony Nese) (with Stori Denali and "Smart" Mark Sterling) by pinfall	Tag team match	11:20
5	Nigel McGuinness defeated Josh Woods by pinfall	Pure wrestling rules match	14:53
6	Red Velvet (c) defeated Viva Van by pinfall	Singles match for the ROH Women's World Television Championship	11:19
7	AR Fox (c) defeated Lio Rush by pinfall	Singles match for the ROH World Television Championship	15:41
8	Deonna Purrazzo (c) defeated Diamanté by submission	Pure Wrestling Rules match for the ROH Women's Pure Championship	13:00
9	Lee Moriarty (c) defeated Ace Austin	Pure Wrestling Rules match for the ROH Pure Championship	16:05
10	Dalton Castle and The Outrunners (Truth Magnum and Turbo Floyd) defeated Shane Taylor Promotions (Shane Taylor, Carlie Bravo, and Capt. Shawn Dean) (c) (with Anthony Ogogo and Christyan XO) by pinfall	Open Challenge six-man tag team match for the ROH World Six-Man Tag Team Championship	17:45
11	Mark Davis (c) defeated Xelhua by pinfall	Singles match for the AEW National Championship	14:12
12	Bandido (c) defeated Blake Christian (with Jay Lethal and Lee Johnson) by pinfall	Singles match for the ROH World Championship	26:05
13	Athena (c) defeated Maya World (with Hyan), Trish Adora, Yuka Sakazaki, Billie Starkz, and Zayda Steel (with Christopher Daniels) by pinfall	Survival of the Fittest match for the ROH Women's World Championship	26:11
(c) / – the champion(s) heading into the match; P / – the match was broadcast on the pre-show

=== ROH Women's World Championship Survival of the Fittest match ===
Eliminated	Wrestler	Eliminated by	Method	Time
1	Zayda Steel	Athena	Pinned after being thrown into a steel chair in the corner	5:01
2	Trish Adora	Yuka Sakazaki	Pinned after a spinning side slam	15:39
3	Yuka Sakazaki	Billie Starkz	Pinned after a double underhook facebuster from the top rope	17:27
4	Billie Starkz	Maya World	Pinned after a sunset flip powerbomb	21:47
5	Maya World	Athena	Pinned after an O-Face off of a ladder	26:12
Winner	Athena (c)	—N/a		26:12

== See also ==
- ROH Survival of the Fittest
