= Shawn Dean =

American professional wrestler (born 1986)

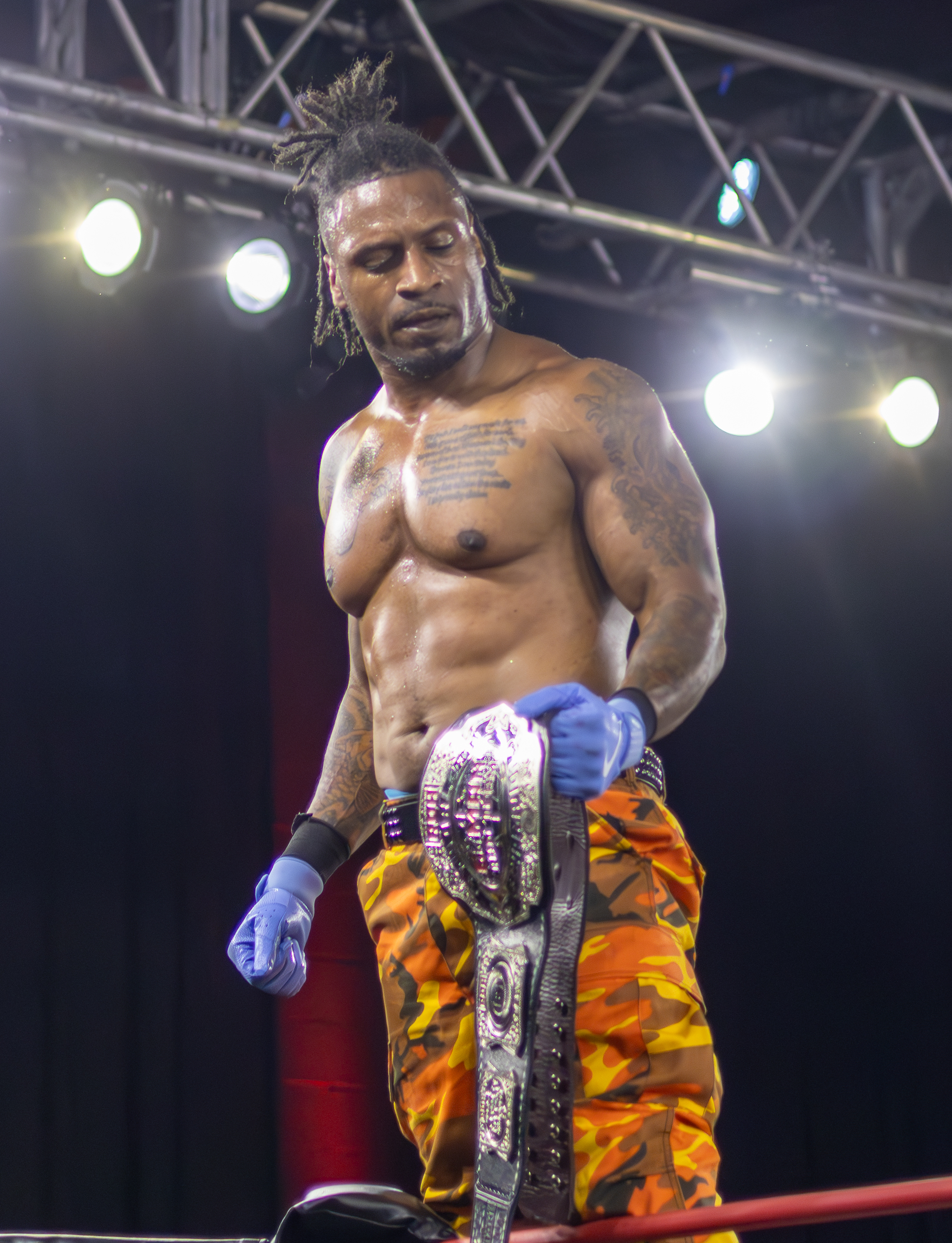
- Dean in August 2025

Personal information
- Born: Shawn Dean McBride; February 19, 1986 (age 40) Chicago, Illinois, U.S.
- Education: Chicago State University

Professional wrestling career
- Ring name: Capt. Shawn Dean
- Billed height: 5 ft 11 in (180 cm)
- Billed weight: 194 lb (88 kg)
- Trained by: AR Fox
- Debut: December 28, 2017
- Military service
- Allegiance: United States
- Branch: United States Navy
- Unit: USS Dwight D. Eisenhower

Shawn Dean McBride (born February 19, 1986) is an American professional wrestler. He is signed to All Elite Wrestling (AEW), where he performs under the ring name Capt. Shawn Dean and is a member of Shane Taylor Promotions and its sub-group The Infantry, where he is a former one-time ROH World Six-Man Tag Team Champion. McBride also works behind the scenes in AEW as the Extras Coordinator.

== Early life ==
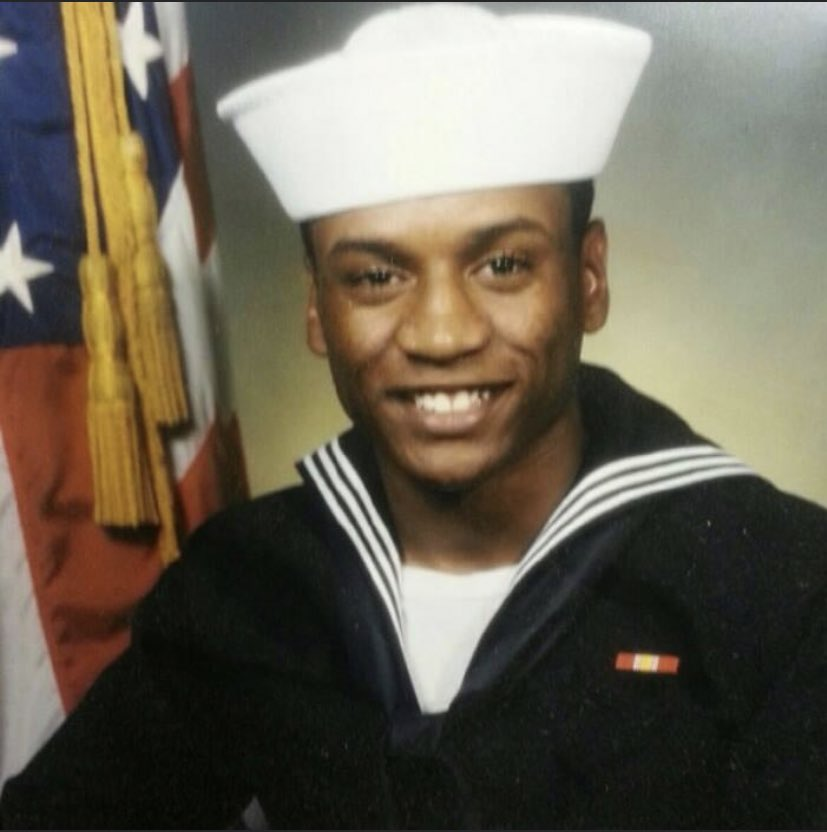
Dean during his time in the United States Navy

McBride was born in Chicago at the Osteopathic Hospital in Hyde Park on February 19, 1986. The third child of six, McBride had a large family that grew up in Englewood, Chicago, a part of the city known for its rough surroundings. Dean’s parents did their best to provide and it was the influence of his father telling him stories of Ric Flair that initially sparked his interest in professional wrestling. After graduating from Hyde Park High School in 2004, McBride joined the United States Navy and was stationed in Norfolk, Virginia aboard the aircraft carrier USS Dwight D. Eisenhower. After completing his military service, McBride attended Chicago State University, studying criminal justice.

== Professional wrestling career ==
=== Training (2017–2020) ===
In 2017, McBride began his professional wrestling career under the ring name Shawn Dean and wrestled mainly in the Florida and Georgia area for AR Fox's promotion WAA4 and ACTION Wrestling.

=== All Elite Wrestling / Ring of Honor (2020–present) ===
==== Early beginnings (2020–2022) ====
Dean made his debut for All Elite Wrestling (AEW) on the March 31, 2020 episode of AEW Dark, losing to Shawn Spears. On the June 3 episode of AEW Dynamite, Dean made his televised AEW debut where he was defeated by Brian Cage. Dean became a regular on AEW Dark throughout 2020 and heading into 2021, failing to score a single win throughout his entire time on the show. On March 5, 2021, after a year of performing for AEW as an unsigned talent, Tony Khan announced that Dean had officially signed with the company. With his promotion as a full-time wrestler, Dean also began working behind the scenes under the job title Extras Coordinator. On the January 5, 2022 episode of AEW Dynamite, Dean defeated MJF by disqualification after CM Punk interfered in the match and hit Dean with the GTS, earning himself his first televised win. On the April 6 episode of AEW Dynamite, Dean defeated Shawn Spears thanks to a distraction caused by Punk. The following week, Dean defeated MJF once again by countout after Wardlow chased MJF out of the ring and caused him to get counted out.

==== The Infantry (2023–present) ====
In 2023, Dean formed a tag team with Carlie Bravo known as The Infantry in Ring of Honor making their debut on the inaugural episode of ROH on Honor Club on March 3, losing to The Kingdom. On the June 22 episode of ROH on Honor Club, The Infantry earned their first win as a team when they defeated The Kingdom after help from Trish Adora who became the third member of The Infantry. On the July 6 episode of ROH, Dean and Bravo teamed with Adora in a six person tag team match, where they were defeated by The Kingdom and Leyla Hirsch. On the September 21 episode of ROH, The Infantry teamed with Willie Mack to challenge for the ROH World Six Man Tag Team Titles against Brian Cage, Bishop Kaun and Toa Liona of Mogul Embassy but were unsuccessful in capturing the titles. On the March 9, 2024 episode of AEW Collision, The Infantry confronted FTR and teased the possibility of facing FTR in the tournament for the vacant AEW World Tag Team Titles as both teams shook hands and showed respect to one another. The following week on Collision, The Infantry defeated Brody King and Buddy Matthews of House of Black thanks to help from Mark Briscoe, earning their first televised win as a team and qualifying for the AEW World Tag Team Title tournament. They fought FTR in the quarter-finals of the tournament on the March 30th episode of Collision but were defeated.

At Supercard of Honor, The Infantry took on The Undisputed Kingdom (Matt Taven and Mike Bennett) for the ROH World Tag Team Championship but were unsuccessful. At Death Before Dishonor, The Infantry (with Trish Adora) defeated Griff Garrison and Anthony Henry (with Maria Kanellis) in a tag team match. On the October 31, 2024 episode of ROH Wrestling, The Infantry joined Shane Taylor Promotions.

On August 29, 2025 at Death Before Dishonor, The Infantry teamed with Shane Taylor to defeat Sons of Texas (Marshall Von Erich, Ross Von Erich, and Sammy Guevara) to win the ROH World Six-Man Tag Team Championship. At Final Battle in December 2025, Shane Taylor Promotions successfully defended the ROH World Six-Man Championship against SkyFlight (Dante Martin, Darius Martin, and Scorpio Sky). On May 15, 2026 at Supercard of Honor, the trio lost their titles to Dalton Castle and The Outrunners (Truth Magnum and Turbo Floyd).

== Championships and accomplishments ==
- 4th Rope Wrestling
  - 4th Rope Tag Team Championship (1 time, current) – with Carlie Bravo
- Georgia Premier Wrestling
  - GPW Southern States Championship (1 time)
- Naptown All Pro
  - NAP Tag Team Championship (1 time) – with Carlie Bravo
- Ring of Honor
  - ROH World Six-Man Tag Team Championship (1 time) – with Carlie Bravo and Shane Taylor
- Southern Honor Wrestling
  - SHW Tag Team Championship (1 time) – with Carlie Bravo
