= Death Before Dishonor (2025) =

Ring of Honor professional wrestling event

- Promotional poster featuring various ROH wrestlers
- Promotion: Ring of Honor
- Date: August 29, 2025
- City: Philadelphia, Pennsylvania
- Venue: 2300 Arena
- Attendance: 916

Event chronology
← Previous; Supercard of Honor	Next → DEAN~!!! 3

Death Before Dishonor chronology
← Previous; 2024	Next → 2026

The 2025 Death Before Dishonor was a professional wrestling live streaming event produced by the American promotion Ring of Honor (ROH). It was the 22nd Death Before Dishonor event and took place on Friday, August 29, 2025, at the 2300 Arena in Philadelphia, Pennsylvania. The event also featured wrestlers from ROH's sister promotion, All Elite Wrestling (AEW). It was scheduled to stream exclusively on Honor Club; however, due to technical issues with that platform, most of the event was simulcast for free on YouTube.

Twelve matches were contested at the event, including four on the Zero Hour pre-show. In the event's final match, which was promoted as part of a double main event, Athena defeated Mina Shirakawa to retain the ROH Women's World Championship. The other main event, which was the penultimate match, saw Bandido defeat Hechicero in a critically acclaimed match to retain the ROH World Championship. In other prominent matches, Sammy Guevara and Rush defeated The Outrunners (Turbo Floyd and Truth Magnum) to win the vacant ROH World Tag Team Championship, and Q.T. Marshall defeated Paul Walter Hauser in a Fight Without Honor.

== Production ==
=== Background ===
Death Before Dishonor is a professional wrestling event, held annually by American promotion Ring of Honor. The first event was held in 2003, and is traditionally one of ROH's biggest signature events in the calendar year. In March 2025, it was announced that Death Before Dishonor would take place on July 11, 2025, at Esports Stadium Arlington in Arlington, Texas. However, on April 22, the event was rescheduled to September 5. The location was also changed to Philadelphia, Pennsylvania at the 2300 Arena. On July 19, it was announced that the event would once again be rescheduled, this time to August 29, 2025.

=== Storylines ===
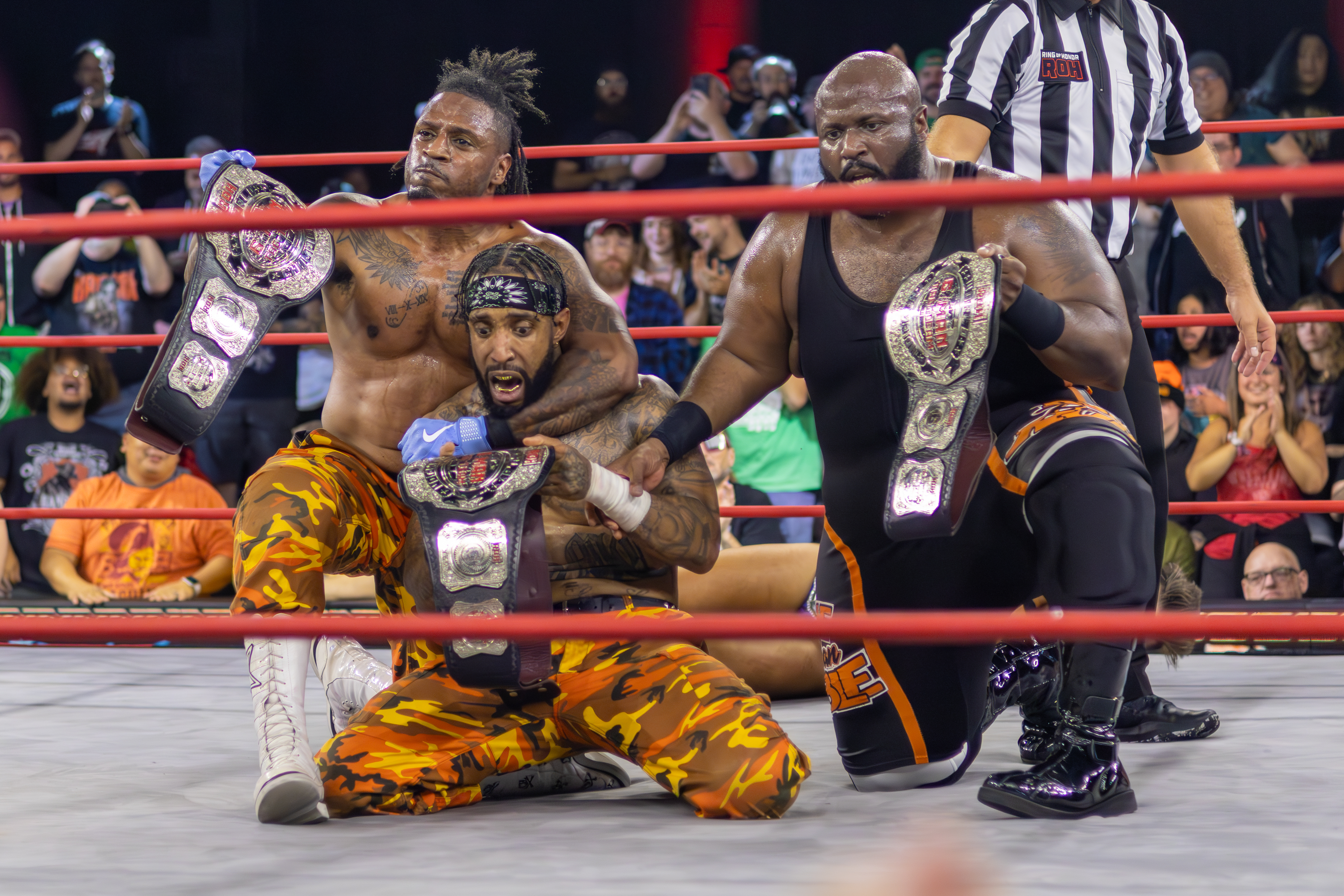
Capt. Shawn Dean, Carlie Bravo and Shane Taylor shortly after winning the ROH World Six-Man Tag Team Championship.

The event featured professional wrestling matches that involved different wrestlers from pre-existing scripted feuds and storylines. Wrestlers portrayed villains, heroes, or less distinguishable characters in scripted events that build tension and culminate in a wrestling match or series of matches. Storylines were produced on ROH's weekly series ROH Honor Club TV exclusively on their streaming service Honor Club, on television programs of sister promotion All Elite Wrestling including Dynamite and Collision.

After Supercard of Honor, Hechicero of the Don Callis Family had been targeting the ROH World Championship held by Bandido. Five days later, on the July 16 episode of Dynamite, the two met on opposite sides of an eight-man tag team match, with Hechicero pinning Bandido to earn his team the win. Three weeks later on August 4, ROH President Tony Khan announced that Hechicero would officially challenge Bandido for the ROH World Championship at Death Before Dishonor.

At All In: Texas, ROH Women's World Champion Athena and interim ROH Women's World Television Champion Mina Shirakawa competed in the Casino Gauntlet match for an opportunity at the AEW Women's World Championship. Shirakawa broke her hand during the match, which sidelined her for multiple weeks, and she ended up being pinned by Athena, who would win the match. Over a month later on August 14, Tony Khan announced on social media that Shirakawa would challenge Athena for her title at Death Before Dishonor.

On the August 14 episode of ROH Honor Club TV, ROH Pure Champion Lee Moriarty faced CMLL wrestler Xelhua in a Proving Ground match that ended in a time limit draw. Due to the nature of Proving Ground matches, this earned Xelhua an opportunity at Moriarty's title, which was announced to take place at Death Before Dishonor.

== Results ==
No.	Results	Stipulations	Times
1^{P}	Jay Lethal defeated Jordan Oliver by submission	Singles match	6:58
2^{P}	MxM Collection (Mansoor and Mason Madden) (with Johnny TV and Taya Valkyrie) defeated The Dark Order (Alex Reynolds and John Silver) (with Evil Uno) and The Frat House (Cole Karter and Griff Garrison) (with Jacked Jameson) by pinfall	Three-way tag team match	7:39
3^{P}	Billie Starkz defeated Ashley Vox by pinfall	Pure Wrestling Rules match	6:22
4^{P}	Dralístico defeated Adam Priest, Angélico (with Serpentico), and AR Fox by pinfall	$50,000 Four-way match	8:25
5	The Conglomeration (Hologram and Tomohiro Ishii) defeated Premier Athletes (Ariya Daivari and Tony Nese) (with "Smart" Mark Sterling) by pinfall	Tag team match	12:32
6	Shane Taylor Promotions (Shane Taylor, Carlie Bravo, and Capt. Shawn Dean) (with Anthony Ogogo and Trish Adora) defeated The Sons of Texas (Sammy Guevara, Marshall Von Erich, and Ross Von Erich) by pinfall	Six-man tag team match for the vacant ROH World Six Man Tag Team Championship	13:05
7	Queen Aminata defeated Taya Valkyrie by pinfall	Inaugural ROH Women's Pure Championship Tournament Pure Wrestling Rules Quarterfinal	8:24
8	The Swirl (Lee Johnson and Blake Christian) defeated The Kingdom (Matt Taven and Mike Bennett) by pinfall	Tag team match	11:23
9	Lee Moriarty (c) defeated Xelhua by submission	Pure Wrestling Rules match for the ROH Pure Championship	16:20
10	Q. T. Marshall defeated Paul Walter Hauser by pinfall	Fight Without Honor	20:34
11	Sammy Guevara and Rush defeated The Outrunners (Turbo Floyd and Truth Magnum) by pinfall	Tag team match for the vacant ROH World Tag Team Championship	13:00
12	Bandido (c) defeated Hechicero (with Don Callis) by pinfall	Singles match for the ROH World Championship	37:17
13	Athena (c) (with Billie Starkz) defeated Mina Shirakawa by pinfall	Singles match for the ROH Women's World Championship	25:27
(c) / – the champion(s) heading into the match; P / – the match was broadcast on the pre-show

== See also ==
- 2025 in professional wrestling
- List of Ring of Honor pay-per-view events
