= Carlie Bravo =

American professional wrestler

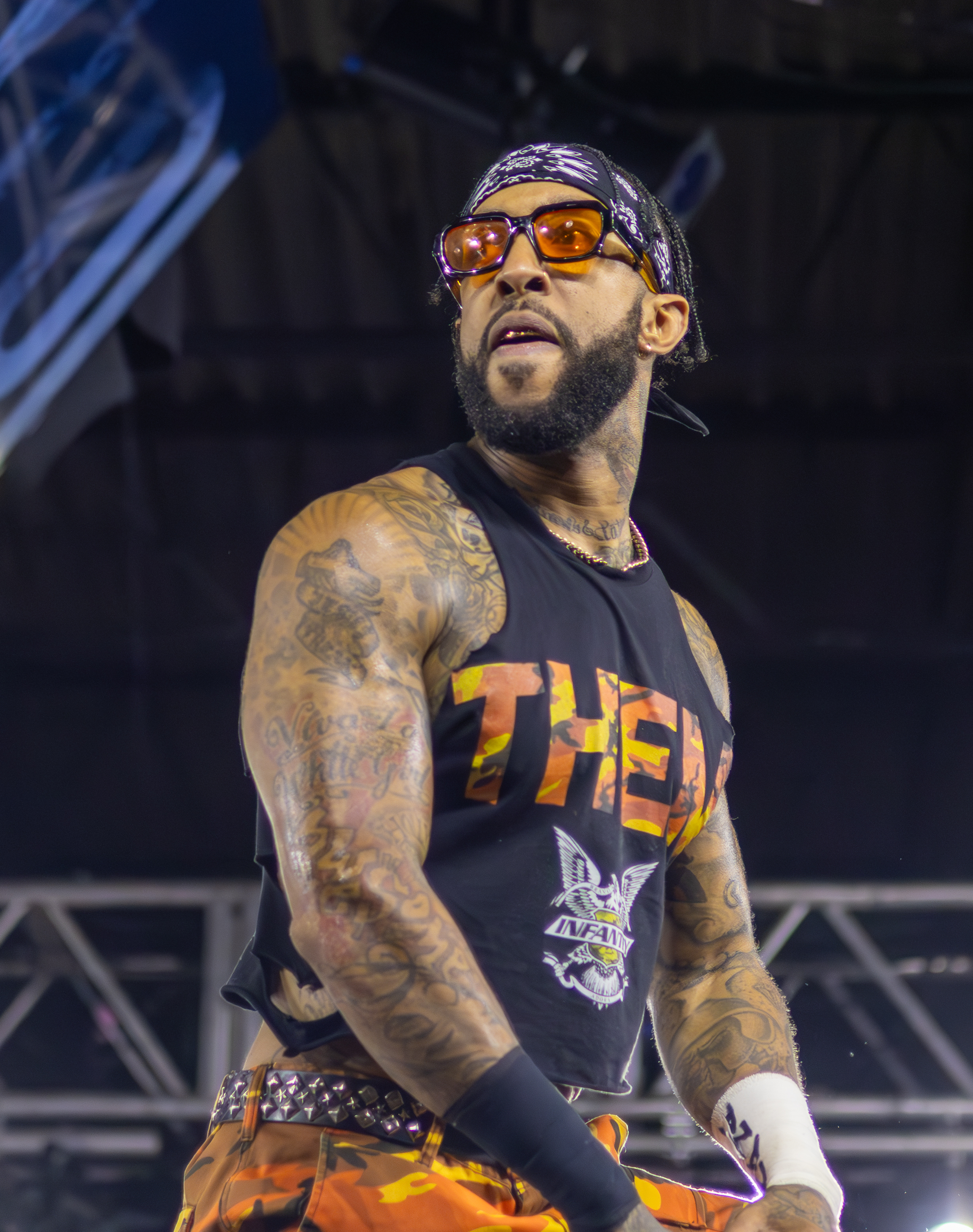
- Bravo in August 2025

Personal information
- Born: December 9, 1985 (age 40) Queens, New York, U.S.
- Children: 3

Professional wrestling career
- Ring name: Carlie Bravo
- Billed height: 6 ft 0 in (1.83 m)
- Billed weight: 202 lb (92 kg)
- Trained by: Nightmare Factory (Cody Rhodes and QT Marshall)
- Debut: August 1, 2020
- Military service
- Branch: United States Marine Corps

Carlie Bravo (born December 9, 1985) is an American professional wrestler. He is signed to All Elite Wrestling (AEW) and Ring of Honor (ROH) and is a member of Shane Taylor Promotions and its sub-group The Infantry, where he is a former one-time ROH World Six-Man Tag Team Champion.

== Early life ==
Bravo was born Queens, New York on December 9 and raised in Spring Valley, New York. He would later move to Atlanta, Georgia to pursue his professional wrestling career. Bravo is a United States Marine Corps (USMC) veteran.

== Professional wrestling career ==
=== Early career (2020–2021) ===
After completing his military service, Bravo transitioned into professional wrestling and began training at the Nightmare Factory operated by Cody Rhodes and QT Marshall in 2020. Bravo made his official professional wrestling debut on August 1, 2020 for Pro South Wrestling losing a Beat The Clock Challenge to Tyler Cullprett.

=== All Elite Wrestling / Ring of Honor (2021–present) ===
==== Early beginnings (2021–2022) ====
In February 2021, Bravo made his debut for All Elite Wrestling (AEW), teaming with Shawn Dean in a losing effort to Peter Avalon and Cezar Bononi on an episode of AEW Dark. Throughout 2021 and 2022, Bravo would team on and off with Dean on AEW Dark, failing to score a single win as a team.

==== The Infantry (2023–present) ====
In 2023, Bravo and Dean, now known as The Infantry, debuted in AEW's sister promotion Ring of Honor on the inaugural episode of ROH on Honor Club on March 3, losing to The Kingdom. On the June 22 episode of ROH on Honor Club, The Infantry earned their first win as a team when they defeated The Kingdom thanks to help from Trish Adora who stopped Maria Kanellis from interfering in the match. With this, Adora became the third member of The Infantry. On the July 6 episode of ROH, The Infantry fought The Kingdom and Leyla Hirsch in a six person tag team match, where they were defeated. On the September 21 episode of ROH, Bravo and Dean teamed with Willie Mack to challenge for the ROH World Six Man Tag Team Championship against Brian Cage, Bishop Kaun and Toa Liona of Mogul Embassy but were unsuccessful in capturing the titles. On the March 9, 2024 episode of AEW Collision, The Infantry interrupted FTR and teased the possibility of facing FTR in the tournament for the vacant AEW World Tag Team Championship as both teams shook hands and showed respect to one another. The following week on Collision, The Infantry defeated Brody King and Buddy Matthews of House of Black thanks to help from Mark Briscoe, earning their first televised win as a team and qualifying for the AEW World Tag Team Title tournament. They fought FTR in the quarter-finals of the tournament on the March 30th episode of Collision but were defeated.

At Supercard of Honor, The Infantry challenged The Undisputed Kingdom (Matt Taven and Mike Bennett) for the ROH World Tag Team Championship but were unsuccessful.

At Death Before Dishonor, The Infantry (with Trish Adora) defeated Griff Garrison and Anthony Henry (with Maria Kanellis) in a tag team match.

On the October 31, 2024 episode of ROH Wrestling, The Infantry joined Shane Taylor Promotions. On August 29, 2025 at Death Before Dishonor, The Infantry teamed with Shane Taylor to defeat Sons of Texas (Marshall Von Erich, Ross Von Erich, and Sammy Guevara) to win the ROH World Six-Man Tag Team Championship. At Final Battle in December 2025, Shane Taylor Promotions successfully defended the ROH World Six-Man Championship against SkyFlight (Dante Martin, Darius Martin, and Scorpio Sky). On May 15, 2026 at Supercard of Honor, the trio lost their titles to Dalton Castle and The Outrunners (Truth Magnum and Turbo Floyd).

== Championships and accomplishments ==
- 1 Fall Wrestling
  - 1FW Heavyweight Championship (1 times, current)
- 4th Rope Wrestling
  - 4th Rope Tag Team Championship (1 time, current) – with Shawn Dean
- Anarchy Wrestling/Atlanta Wrestling Entertainment
  - Anarchy Heavyweight Championship (1 time, final)
  - GWC Championship (1 time, final)
  - Unified Georgia Wrestling Crown Championship (1 time, current)
- Intense Wrestling Entertainment
  - IWE Mayhem Championship (1 time)
- Naptown All Pro
  - NAP Tag Team Championship (1 time) – with Shawn Dean
- Pro Wrestling Illustrated
  - Ranked No. 332 of the top singles wrestlers in the PWI 500 in 2026
- Ring of Honor
  - ROH World Six-Man Tag Team Championship (1 time) – with Shane Taylor and Shawn Dean
- Southern Fried Championship Wrestling
  - SFCW Classic Championship (1 time)
- Southern Honor Wrestling
  - SHW Tag Team Championship (1 time) – with Shawn Dean
