= Shane Taylor Promotions =

Professional wrestling stable

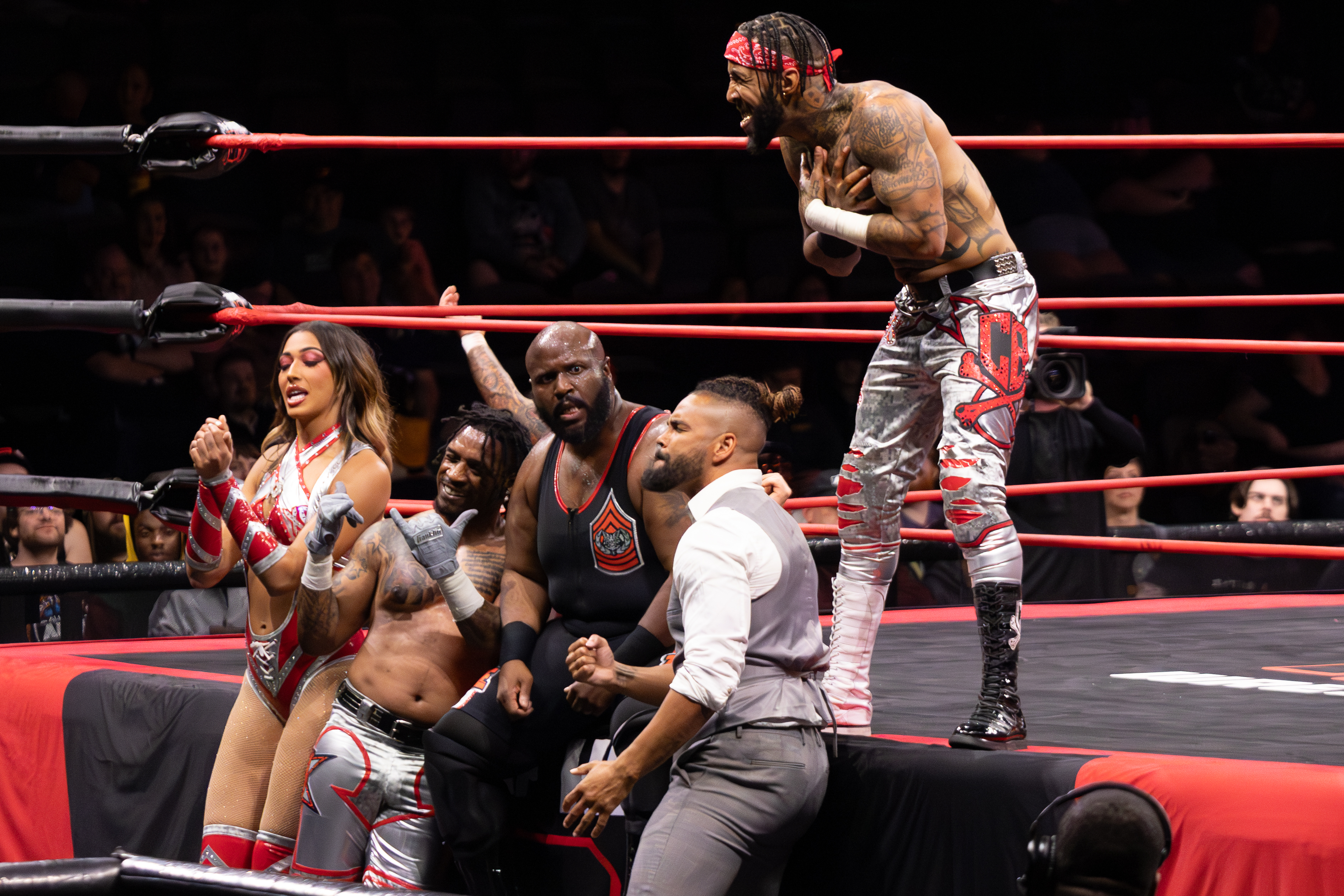
- From left to right: Christyan XO, Capt. Shawn Dean, Shane Taylor, Anthony Ogogo and Carlie Bravo at the 2026 ROH Supercard of Honor event.

Stable
- Name: Shane Taylor Promotions
- Leader: Shane Taylor
- Members: Lee Moriarty; Anthony Ogogo; Carlie Bravo; Capt. Shawn Dean; Trish Adora; Tehuti Miles; Christyan XO (valet)
- Former members: Jasper Kaun; Moses Maddox; Ron Hunt; O’Shay Edwards; JD Griffey
- Debut: November 3, 2019
- Years active: 2019–2022; 2023–present

Shane Taylor Promotions (STP) is an American professional wrestling stable currently performing in All Elite Wrestling (AEW) and its sister promotion Ring of Honor (ROH). The stable consisting of leader Shane Taylor, Lee Moriarty, Anthony Ogogo, Carlie Bravo, Capt. Shawn Dean, Trish Adora, Tehuti Miles, and Christyan XO, who serves as their valet.

== History ==
=== Ring of Honor / All Elite Wrestling (2019–2021, 2023–present) ===
==== First interation (2019–2021) ====
In late-2019, Shane Taylor formed a stable called "Shane Taylor Promotions" with Jasper Kaun, Moses Maddox, and Ron Hunt. In early 2020, ROH went on hiatus due to the COVID-19 pandemic. After ROH resumed operations, Taylor returned in October 2020. In February 2021, Shane Taylor Promotions (Taylor, Kaun, and Moses) defeated MexiSquad (Bandido, Flamita, and Rey Horus) to win the ROH World Six-Man Tag Team Championship. At Best in the World in July 2021, Shane Taylor Promotions successfully defended the ROH World Six-Man Tag Team Championship against Dak Draper, Dalton Castle, and Eli Isom. At Final Battle in December 2021, Kaun, Moses, and O'Shay Edwards (substituting for Taylor) lost the ROH World Six-Man Tag Team Championship to The Righteous (Bateman, Dutch, and Vincent). ROH was subsequently placed on hiatus once again upon its acquisition by All Elite Wrestling owner Tony Khan.

==== Second interation (2023–present) ====
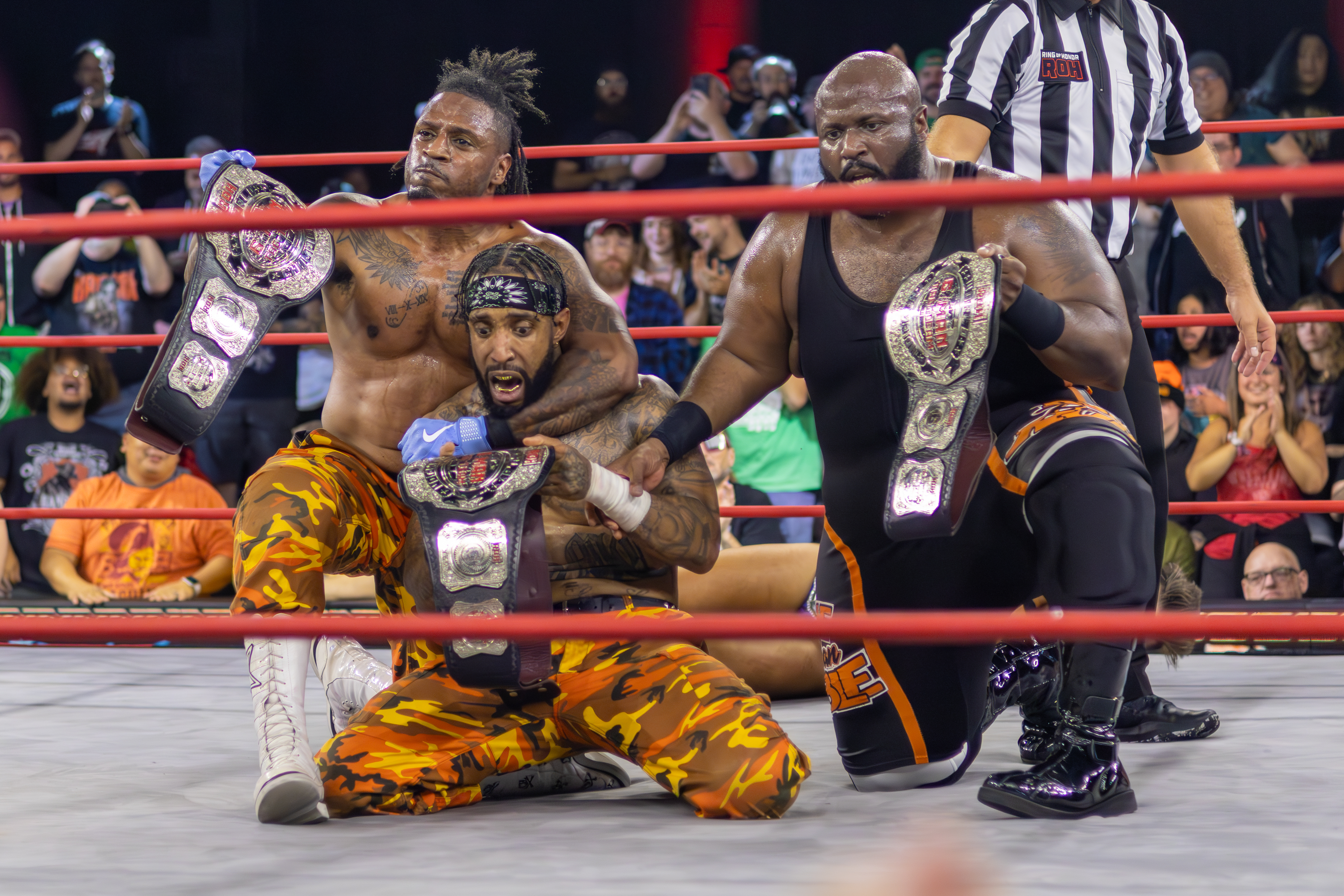
Capt. Shawn Dean, Carlie Bravo and Shane Taylor shortly after winning the ROH World Six-Man Tag Team Championship.

In September 2023, Shane Taylor Promotions was reformed as a tag team with Lee Moriarty. At WrestleDream in October 2023, Taylor and Moriarty teamed with Diamante and Mercedes Martinez, to face Athena, Billie Starkz, Keith Lee, and Satoshi Kojima in an eight-person mixed tag team match but were unsuccessful. In April 2024, Taylor recruited Anthony Ogogo to join Shane Taylor Promotions.

In October 2024, Taylor recruited The Infantry (Carlie Bravo, Shawn Dean, and Trish Adora) into Shane Taylor Promotions.

On the January 9, 2025 episode of ROH Shane Taylor Promotions Shane Taylor & Lee Moriarty defeated Gates of Agony meeting former member Kaun in the fray. On the January 12, 2025 tapings of ROH Shane Taylor, Lee Moriarty, EJ Nduka & Lee Johnson defeated Evil Uno, Alex Reynolds, Serpentico & Boulder Bronson in an eight-man tag team match. On August 29, 2025, at Death Before Dishonor Carlie Bravo, Shawn Dean and Shane Taylor as Shane Taylor Promotions defeated Sons of Texas (Sammy Guevara, Marshall Von Erich and Ross Von Erich) to win the ROH World Six-Man Tag Team Championship.

On the January 29, 2026 episode of ROH, Bravo introduced newest member Christyan Ried aka Christyan XO to The Infantry. Then shortly after she became a part of Shane Taylors Promotions managing Shane Taylors Promotions at ROH shows and ROH Pay-per-view events such as Supercard of Honor 2026 and others plus competing in ROH women's competition alongside Trish Adora while representing Shane Taylors Promotions.

On May 15, 2026, at Supercard of Honor, The Infantry and Taylor lost the ROH World Six-Man Tag Team Championship to Dalton Castle and The Outrunners (Truth Magnum and Turbo Floyd). On the August 6 episode of ROH Wrestling, Tehuti Miles joined STP.

== Members ==
*	Founding member
L	Leader

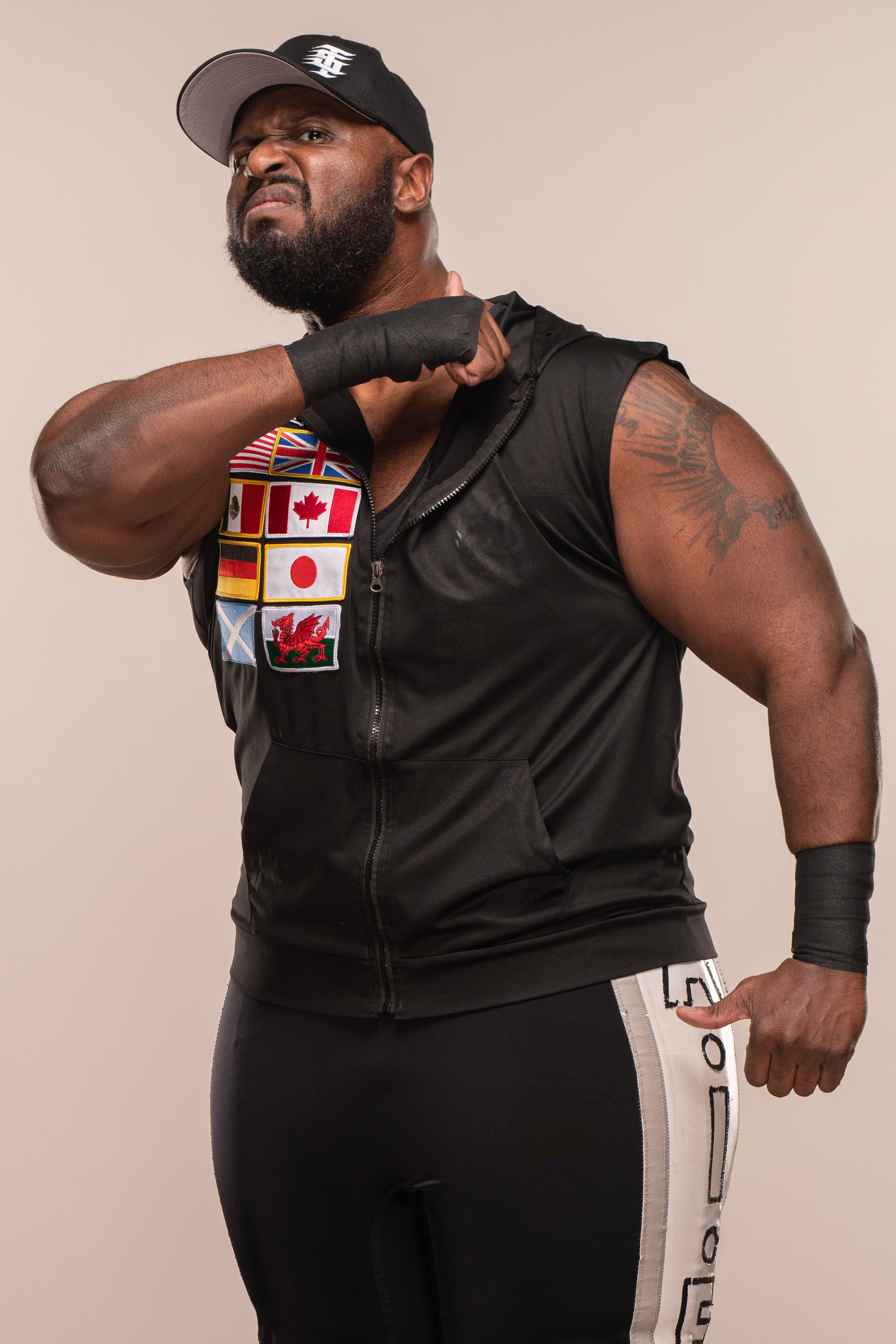
Shane Taylor (*/L)

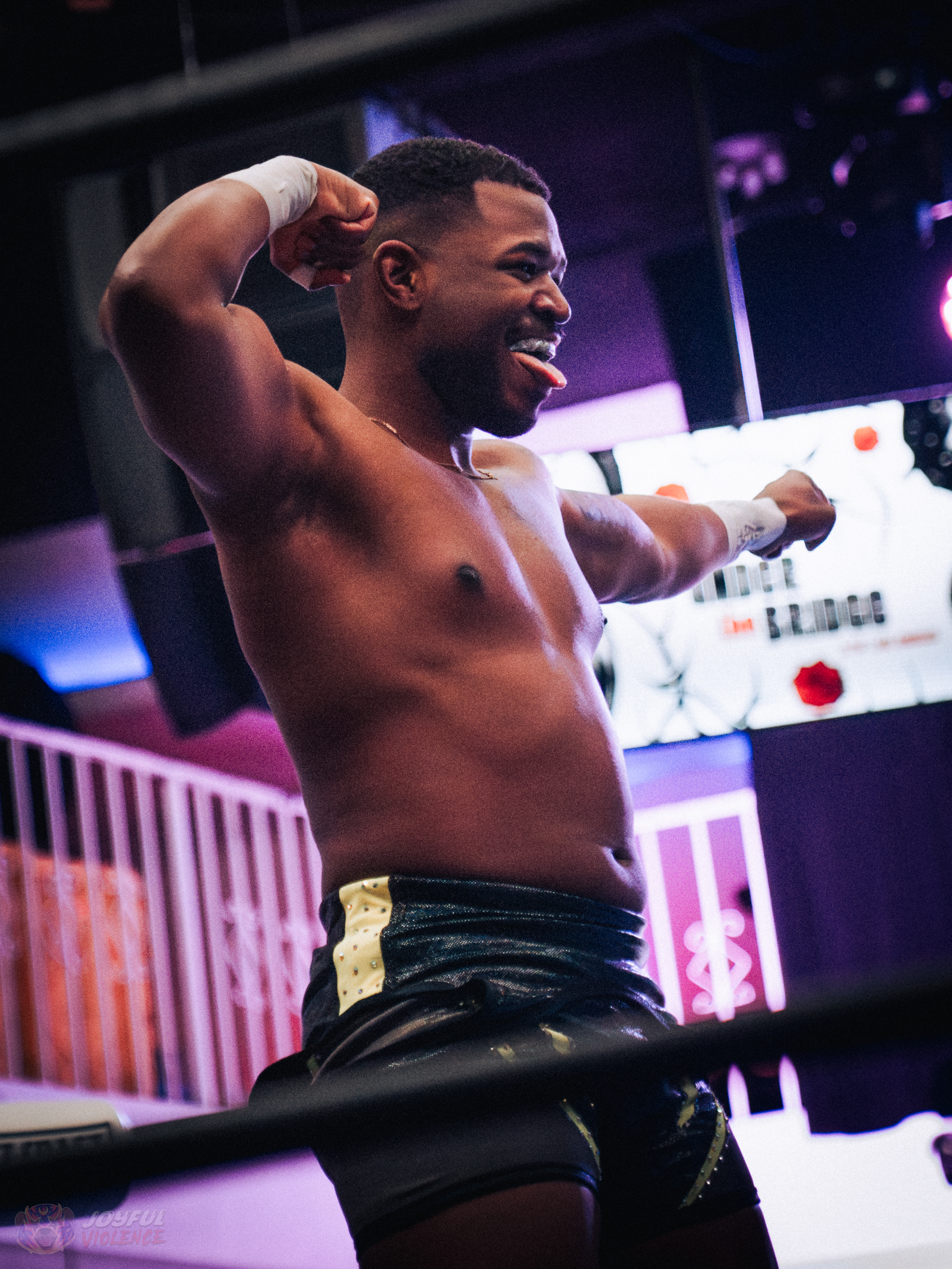
Lee Moriarty

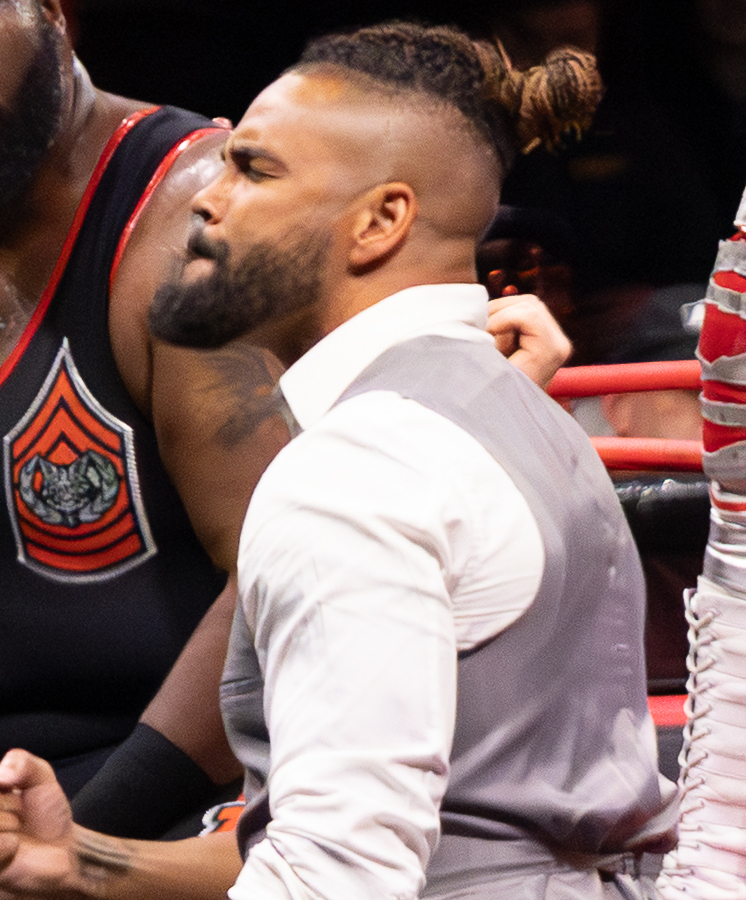
Anthony Ogogo

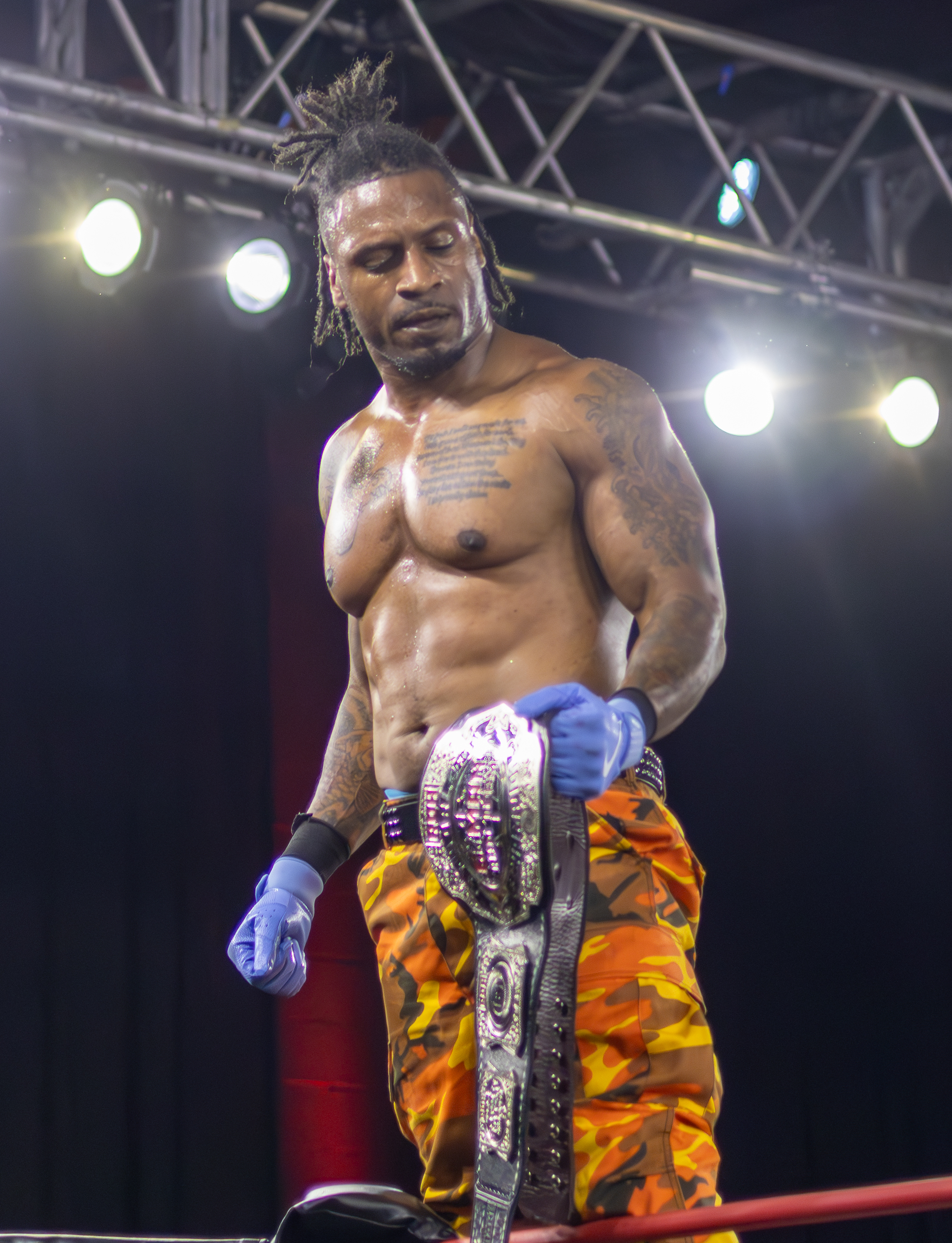
Capt. Shawn Dean

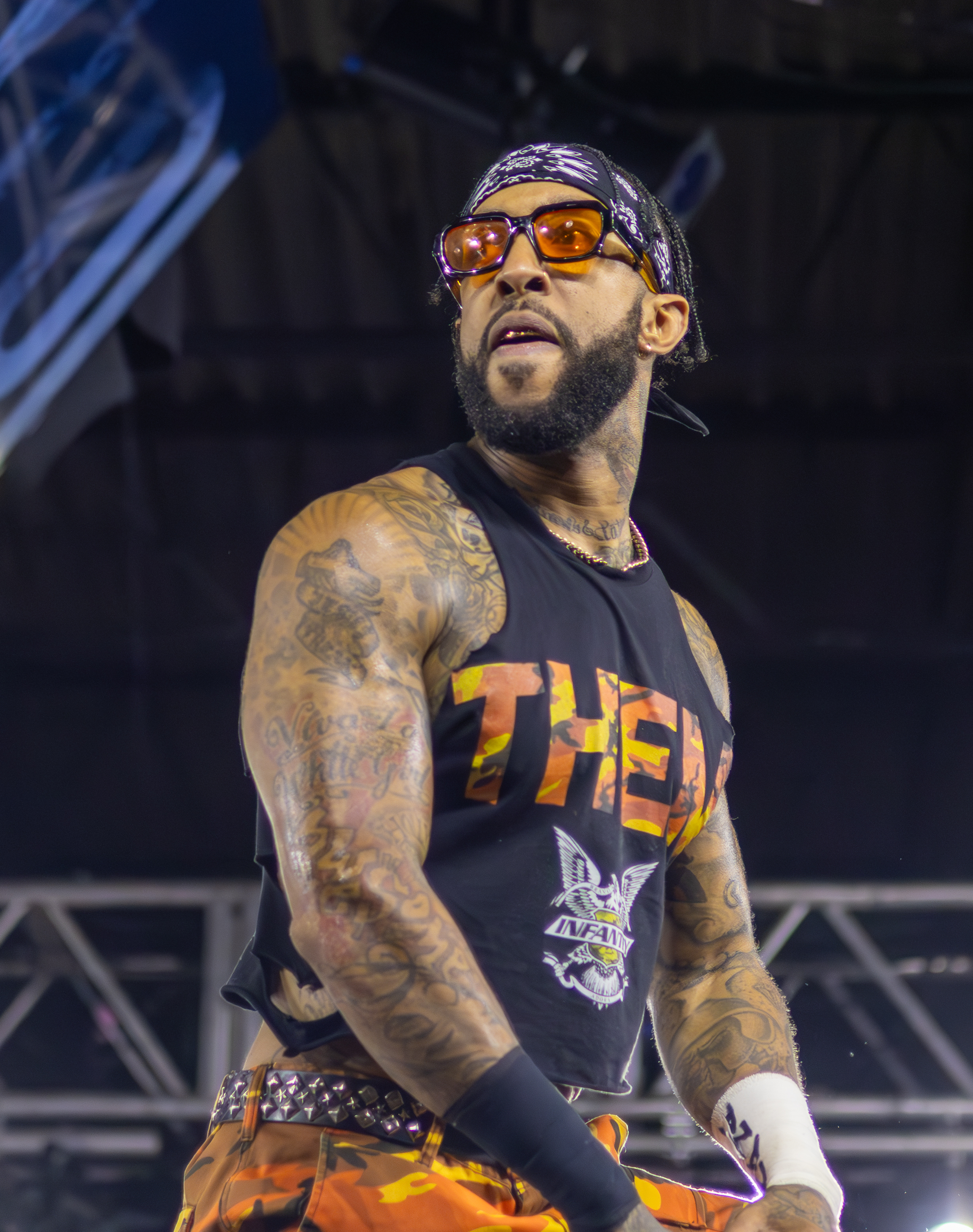
Carlie Bravo

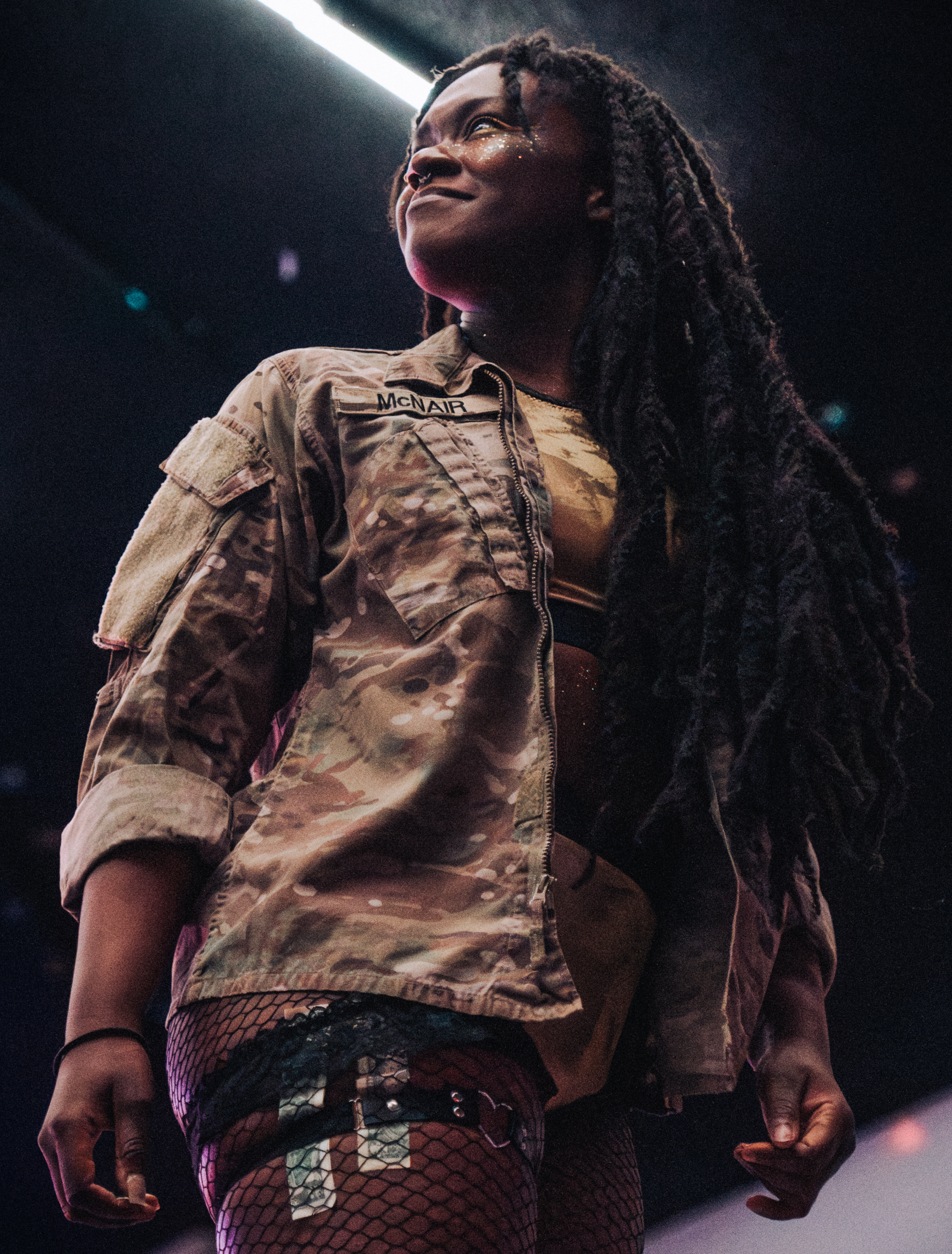
Trish Adora

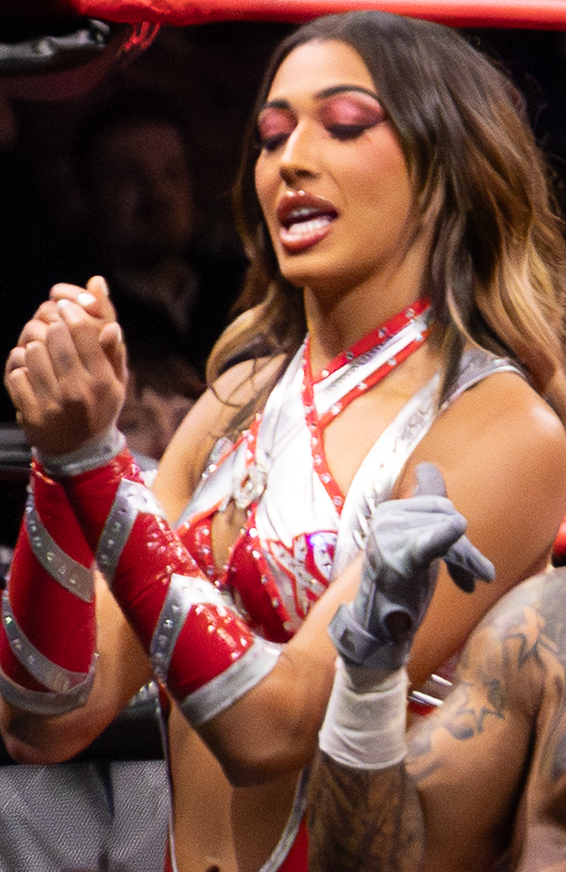
Christyan XO

=== Current ===
Member		Joined
Shane Taylor	*L	November 3, 2019; September 14, 2023 (rejoined)
Lee Moriarty		September 14, 2023
Anthony Ogogo		April 6, 2024
Capt. Shawn Dean		January 9, 2025
Carlie Bravo		January 9, 2025
Trish Adora		January 9, 2025
Christyan XO		January 29, 2026
Tehuti Miles		August 6, 2026

=== Former ===
Member		Joined	Left
Jasper Kaun	*	November 3, 2019	December 11, 2021
Moses Maddox	*	November 3, 2019	December 11, 2021
Rox Hunt	*	November 3, 2019	May 20, 2022
O'Shay Edwards		December 11, 2021	June 18, 2022
JD Griffey	*	November 3, 2019	December 17, 2022

== Sub-groups ==
=== Current ===
Affiliate	Members	Tenure	Type
The Infantry	Carlie Bravo; Capt. Shawn Dean; Trish Adora; Christyan XO	2025–present	Stable

== Championships and accomplishments ==
- 4th Rope Wrestling
  - 4th Rope Tag Team Championship (1 time, current) – Bravo and Dean
- Ring of Honor
  - ROH World Six-Man Tag Team Championship (2 times) – Shane Taylor, Kaun, and Moses (1) and Taylor, Bravo and Dean (1)
  - ROH Pure Championship (1 time, current) (1)
