= Death Before Dishonor (2026) =

2026 Ring of Honor pay-per-view and livestreaming event

- Promotional poster featuring Athena, Red Velvet, Lee Moriarty, Zayda Steel, Lio Rush, and Dalton Castle
- Promotion: Ring of Honor
- Date: August 21, 2026
- City: Philadelphia, Pennsylvania
- Venue: 2300 Arena
- Attendance: 799

Event chronology
← Previous; Supercard of Honor	Next → Final Battle

Death Before Dishonor chronology
← Previous; 2025	Next → —

The 2026 Death Before Dishonor was a professional wrestling live streaming event produced by the American promotion Ring of Honor (ROH). It was the 23rd Death Before Dishonor event and took place on Friday, August 21, 2026, at the 2300 Arena in Philadelphia, Pennsylvania. The show was broadcast on both HonorClub and MyAEW (for international subscribers to the latter service).

Thirteen matches were contested at the event, including four on the Zero-Hour pre-show. In the main event, Athena defeated Hazuki to retain the ROH Women's World Championship. In other prominent matches, Bandido defeated Nick Wayne to retain the ROH World Championship, Action Andretti defeated "Blackheart" Lio Rush in a Fight Without Honor to win the ROH World Television Championship, Lee Moriarty defeated Katsuyori Shibata to retain the ROH Pure Championship, and in the opening contest, The Lethal Twist (Jay Lethal, Blake Christian, and Lee Johnson) defeated Dalton Castle and The Outrunners (Turbo Floyd and Truth Magnum) to win the ROH World Six-Man Tag Team Championship, making Lethal the first man to hold all five of ROH men's championships.

== Production ==
=== Background ===
Death Before Dishonor is a professional wrestling event, held annually by American promotion Ring of Honor. The first event was held in 2003, and is traditionally one of ROH's biggest signature events in the calendar year. On July 6, 2026, it was announced that Death Before Dishonor would return to the 2300 Arena on August 21, 2026.

=== Storylines ===
Other on-screen personnel
Role	Name
Commentators	Ian Riccaboni (Zero Hour Pre-Show & Main Show)
Commentators	Caprice Coleman (Zero Hour Pre-Show & Main Show)
Commentators	Rocky Romero (Zero Hour Pre-Show)
Commentators	Trent Beretta (Zero Hour Pre-Show)
Commentators	Jon Moxley (Main Show)

The event featured professional wrestling matches that involved different wrestlers from pre-existing scripted feuds and storylines. Wrestlers portrayed villains, heroes, or less distinguishable characters in scripted events that build tension and culminate in a wrestling match or series of matches. Storylines were produced on ROH's weekly series ROH Honor Club TV exclusively on their streaming service Honor Club, on television programs of sister promotion All Elite Wrestling including Dynamite and Collision.

At the June 22 ROH taping, Deonna Purrazzo defended the ROH Women's Pure Championship against Steph De Lander but suffered a lower-leg injury during the match, forcing the referee to call a stoppage; the match ultimately never aired. On the July 30 episode of ROH Honor Club TV, it was announced that the two will face again in a rematch at Death Before Dishonor.

At Supercard of Honor, "Blackheart" Lio Rush challenged AR Fox for the ROH World Television Championship, but ultimately lost due to interference by Action Andretti, his former partner in CRU. Andretti went on to explain he tried to contact Rush repeatedly to get their tag team back together, but was unable to after Rush had transformed into his "Blackheart" persona. This led to a three-way match where Fox defended his ROH World Television Championship against both Rush and Andretti at Global Wars Cincinnati, with Rush securing the win and the title. On the July 30 ROH Honor Club TV, it was announced that Rush would defend his newly won title against Andretti at Death Before Dishonor in a Fight Without Honor.

==== Changed match ====
At the 2024 Final Battle, ROH Pure Champion Lee Moriarty held an open challenge for his title, which was answered by AEW commentator and former ROH Pure Champion Nigel McGuinness; Moriarty would end up winning the match. At Final Battle the following year, McGuinness faced Moriarty in a non-title 30-minute Iron Man match, which Moriarty won in overtime 5–4. Seven months later, on the July 30, 2026 ROH Honor Club TV, McGuinness challenged Moriarty to one more ROH Pure Championship match at Death Before Dishonor, vowing that if he loses, he would never compete in ROH ever again. However, prior to Death Before Dishonor, McGuinness competed in the AEW Continental Challenge Cup, where he injured his right foot in his first-round match against Katsuyori Shibata. While McGuinness wouldn't withdraw from the tournament, he did announce he would have to pull out of Death Before Dishonor. A number one contender's match was scheduled for the August 20 ROH Honor Club TV between former ROH Pure Champions Shibata and Wheeler Yuta, with the former defeating the latter to challenge Moriarty for the title the following night at Death Before Dishonor.

== Results ==
No.	Results	Stipulations	Times
1^{P}	Mina Shirakawa and Queen Aminata defeated Viva Van and VertVixen by pinfall	Tag team match	10:03
2^{P}	ELP defeated Adam Brooks by pinfall	Singles match	8:48
3^{P}	Komander defeated AR Fox and Soleil by pinfall	Three-way match	6:36
4^{P}	The Don Callis Family (Hechicero and Brian Cage) (with Rocky Romero and Trent Beretta) defeated Bustah and the Brain (Alec Price and Jordan Oliver) by pinfall	Tag team match	7:42
5	The Lethal Twist (Jay Lethal, Blake Christian, and Lee Johnson) defeated Dalton Castle and The Outrunners (Turbo Floyd and Truth Magnum) (c) by pinfall	Trios match for the ROH World Six-Man Tag Team Championship	14:03
6	Deonna Purrazzo (c) defeated Steph De Lander by submission	Pure Wrestling Rules match for the ROH Women's Pure Championship	8:47
7	Red Velvet (c) defeated Skye Blue, Marina Shafir (with Jon Moxley), and Zayda Steel (with Christopher Daniels) by pinfall	Four-way match for the ROH Women's World Television Championship	10:53
8	Lee Moriarty (c) defeated Katsuyori Shibata by pinfall	Pure Wrestling Rules match for the ROH Pure Championship	13:15
9	El Sky Team (Místico and Máscara Dorada) (c) defeated La Facción Ingobernable (Sammy Guevara and The Beast Mortos), The Kingdom (Matthew Taven and Michael Bennett), and Top Flight (Dante Martin and Darius Martin) (with Christopher Daniels) by pinfall	Four-way tag team match for the ROH World Tag Team Championship	19:17
10	Daniel Garcia defeated Adam Priest by submission	Continental Challenge Cup Play-in match The winner replaced Eddie Kingston in the Continental Challenge Cup quarterfinal match.	16:52
11	Action Andretti defeated Lio Rush (c) by pinfall	Fight Without Honor for the ROH World Television Championship	23:55
12	Bandido (c) defeated Nick Wayne by pinfall	Singles match for the ROH World Championship	22:40
13	Athena (c) (with Billie Starkz and Diamante) defeated Hazuki by pinfall	Singles match for the ROH Women's World Championship	30:15
(c) / – the champion(s) heading into the match; P / – the match was broadcast on the pre-show

== See also ==
- 2026 in professional wrestling
- List of Ring of Honor pay-per-view events
