= Trish Adora =

American professional wrestler (born 1989)

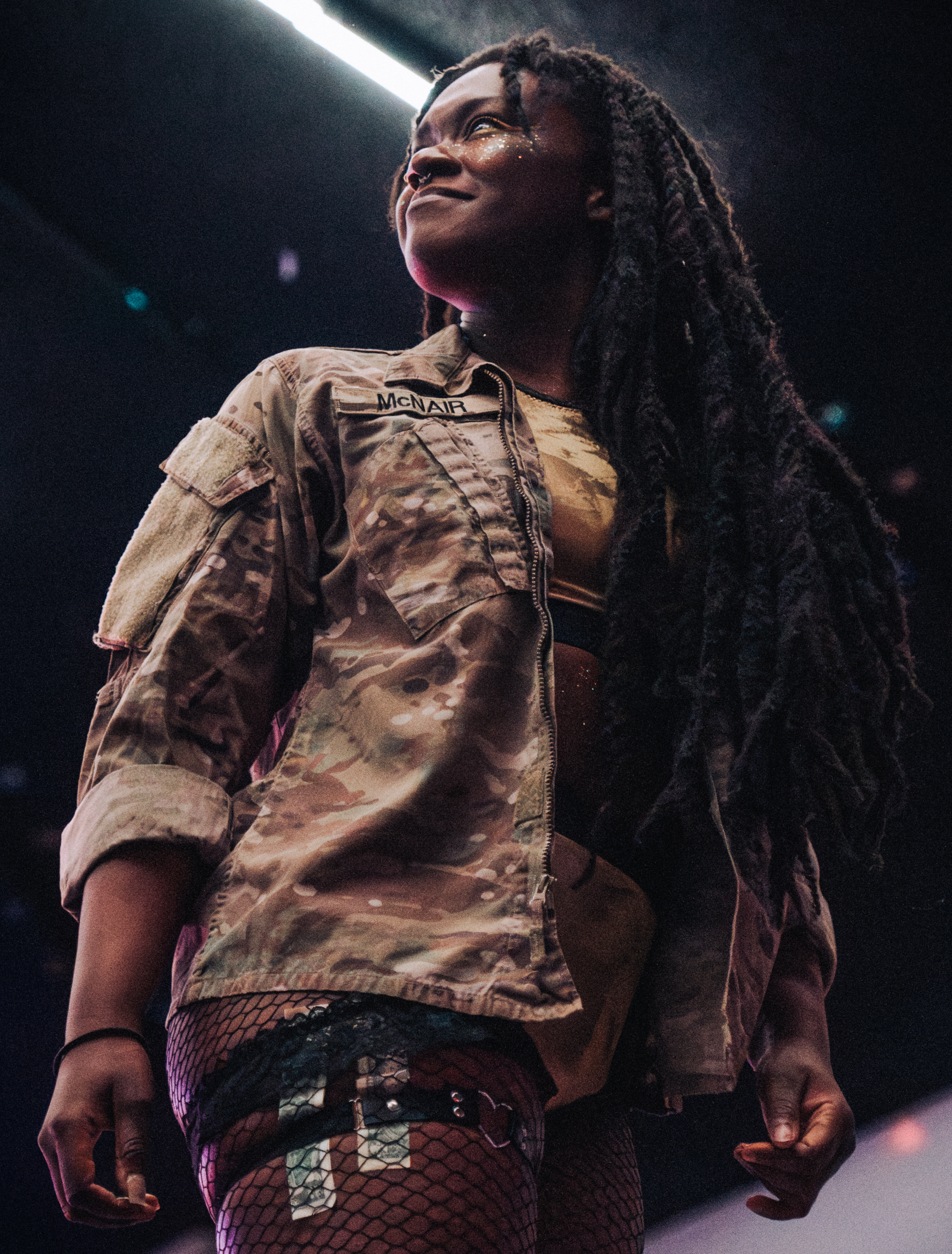
- Adora in February 2024

Personal information
- Born: Patrice Adora McNair; March 13, 1989 (age 37) Washington, D.C., U.S.

Professional wrestling career
- Ring names: Trish Adora; Maze
- Billed height: 5 ft 8 in (173 cm)
- Trained by: Dudley Boyz
- Debut: August 20, 2016
- Military service
- Allegiance: United States
- Branch: United States Army
- Service years: 8 years

Patrice Adora McNair (born March 13, 1989), known under the ring name Trish Adora, is an American professional wrestler currently working as a freelancer, predominantly for All Elite Wrestling and Ring of Honor (ROH), where she is a member of Shane Taylor Promotions and its sub-group The Infantry. She is the inaugural Pan-Afrikan World Diaspora Wrestling World Champion. She has also wrestled in numerous promotions such as Game Changer Wrestling, Progress Wrestling, and New Japan Pro-Wrestling.

== Early life and career ==
Patrice McNair was born on March 13, 1989, in Washington, D.C. Prior to her wrestling career, McNair served eight years in the United States Army.

== Professional wrestling career ==
=== Early career (2016–2020) ===
In May 2015, McNair started her wrestling training at Team 3D Academy, owned by Bubba Ray Dudley and D-Von Dudley. In 2016, McNair made her wrestling debut under the ring name Trish Adora. Adora made her first WWE appearance on the September 5, 2018, episode of NXT as an enhancement talent, where she lost to the NXT Women's Champion Kairi Sane in a non-title match.

On February 15, 2020, at F1ght Club, Adora became the first Pan-Afrikan World Diaspora Wrestling World Champion in a tournament final.

=== All Elite Wrestling / Ring of Honor (2021–present) ===
==== Early appearances (2021―2022) ====
In May 2021, Adora began appearing for Ring of Honor (ROH). She competed in the ROH Women's World Championship tournament, where she defeated Marti Belle in the first round and defeated Allysin Kay in the quarterfinal respectively. However, she lost to Miranda Alize in the semifinals. On September 29, Adora has signed with ROH. On October 27, ROH announced that they would go to hiatus after Final Battle in December, and all personnel would also be released from their contracts. Adora first appeared for ROH's sister company, All Elite Wrestling (AEW) on the November 22, 2021, episode of Dark: Elevation losing to Riho.

On the May 16, 2022, episode of Elevation, Adora challenged Mercedes Martinez for the ROH Women's World Championship, but was unsuccessful. On December 10, 2022, Adora returned to ROH after its relaunch, where she was defeated by Willow Nightingale during the Final Battle pre-show.

==== The Infantry (2023–present) ====
After returning to Ring of Honor Trish Adora managed and valeted Carlie Bravo & Shawn Dean and became a female part of their tag team stable called The Infantry. On July 6, 2023, The Infantry took on The Undisputed Kingdom (Matt Taven and Mike Bennett) and Leyla Hirsch as her tag team valet rival Maria Kanellis ordered it, but the trio were not successful.

On February 14, 2024, Adora entered the inaugural ROH Women's World Television Championship tournament against Mercedes Martinez but lost to her in the first round. As of March 2024, The Infantry including Adora began making appearances on AEW. On April 5 at Supercard of Honor Trish Adora managed her tag team stable The Infantry as they challenged The Undisputed Kingdom for the ROH World Tag Team Championship but were unsuccessful. On July 26 at Death Before Dishonor, Adora managed The Infantry in a tag team match and they defeated Griff Garrison and Anthony Henry (with Maria Kanellis) On the October 31 episode of ROH Wrestling, The Infantry joined Shane Taylor Promotions. On the January 9, 2025, episode of ROH Adora defeated Harley Cameron and ended her undefeated streak.

=== Tokyo Joshi Pro-Wrestling (2023–present) ===
On January 4, 2023, Adora made her debut at Tokyo Joshi Pro-Wrestling (TJPW) during the Tokyo Joshi Pro '23 event, where she unsuccessfully challenged Miu Watanabe for the International Princess Championship. On March 31, during TJPW's first American show in Los Angeles, California, Adora teamed with Hyper Misao to defeat the team of Raku and Yuki Aino.

=== New Japan Pro-Wrestling (2023–present) ===
On June 10, 2023, Adora made her debut for New Japan Pro-Wrestling (NJPW) at the 2023 NJPW Academy Spring Showcase, in a losing effort against Johnnie Robbie.

On January 13, 2024, at Battle in the Valley, Adora unsuccessfully challenged Giulia for the Strong Women's Championship.

== Personal life ==
McNair has cited Jacqueline as the one who sparked her interest in wrestling.

== Championship and accomplishments ==
- Generation Championship Wrestling
  - GCW Women's Championship (1 time)
- PAWDWC Presents F1ght Club Pro Wrestling
  - Pan-Afrikan World Diaspora Wrestling World Championship (1 time, inaugural)
  - Pan-Afrikan World Diaspora Wrestling World Championship Tournament (2020)
- Pro Wrestling Illustrated
  - Ranked No. 18 of the top 150 female wrestlers in the PWI Women's 150 in 2021
  - Ranked No. 50 of the top 500 singles wrestlers in the PWI 500 in 2022
