= Lee Johnson (wrestler) =

American professional wrestler (born 1997)

- Johnson in August 2025

Personal information
- Born: December 13, 1997 (age 28) Gary, Indiana, U.S.
- Spouse: Julia Hart (m. 2023)

Professional wrestling career
- Ring name: Lee Johnson
- Billed height: 5 ft 10 in (178 cm)
- Billed weight: 189 lb (86 kg)
- Billed from: Atlanta, Georgia
- Trained by: AR Fox; Q. T. Marshall
- Debut: November 30, 2017

Lee Johnson (born December 13, 1997) is an American professional wrestler. He is signed to both All Elite Wrestling (AEW) and its sister promotion Ring of Honor (ROH), where he is a member of The Lethal Twist and its sub-group The Swirl. He is one-third of the ROH World Six-Man Tag Team Champions with fellow stablemates Jay Lethal and Blake Christian in their first reign as a team.

== Professional wrestling career ==
=== Early career (2017–2020) ===
Trained by AR Fox and Q. T. Marshall Johnson made his professional wrestling debut on 2017, working at World Wrestling Alliance 4 (WWA4) in Georgia.

=== All Elite Wrestling / Ring of Honor (2020–present) ===
Johnson made his All Elite Wrestling (AEW) debut on the April 7, 2020, episode of AEW Dark in a losing effort against his trainer Q.T. Marshall. Johnson subsequently joined his trainer's new stable The Factory alongside Cole Karter, Nick Comoroto, Aaron Solo, and QT Marshall. After the dissolution of The Factory, Lee Johnson began making appearances with the revived Ring of Honor. At Supercard of Honor, he unsuccessfully challenged Kyle Fletcher for the ROH World Television Championship. In October 2024, Johnson formed a tag team with E. J. Nduka, known as "LEEJ". In December 2024 at Final Battle Zero Hour, LEEJ turned heel after by attacking Gates of Agony (Bishop Kaun and Toa Liona) after losing to them in a tag match.

In 2025, LEEJ quietly disbanded as Johnson formed an alliance with Blake Christian known as The Swirl. On the January 1, 2026 episode of Ring of Honor Wrestling, Johnson and Christian added Jay Lethal to their alliance with the trio going by the name of "The Lethal Twist". On August 21 at Death Before Dishonor, The Lethal Twist defeated Dalton Castle and The Outrunners (Turbo Floyd and Truth Magnum) to win the ROH World Six-Man Tag Team Championship.

=== New Japan Pro-Wrestling (2026) ===
In October 2026, Johnson made his debut for New Japan Pro-Wrestling (NJPW) with Blake Christian as "The Swirl", competing in the Super Junior Tag League as part of B-Block. The Swirl finished the tournament with eight 8 points but failed to advance to the finals due to losing the tiebreaker to the Ichiban Sweet Boys (Kosei Fujita and Robbie Eagles),

== Personal life ==
Johnson married fellow professional wrestler Julia Hart on October 13, 2023.

== Championships and accomplishments ==
- Georgia Premier Wrestling
  - GPW Tag Team Championship (2 times) – with Alan Angels
- Pro Wrestling Illustrated
  - Ranked No. 271 of the top 500 singles wrestlers in the PWI 500 in 2026
- Ring of Honor
  - ROH World Six-Man Tag Team Championship (1 time, current) – with Jay Lethal and Blake Christian
