= Griff Garrison =

American professional wrestler

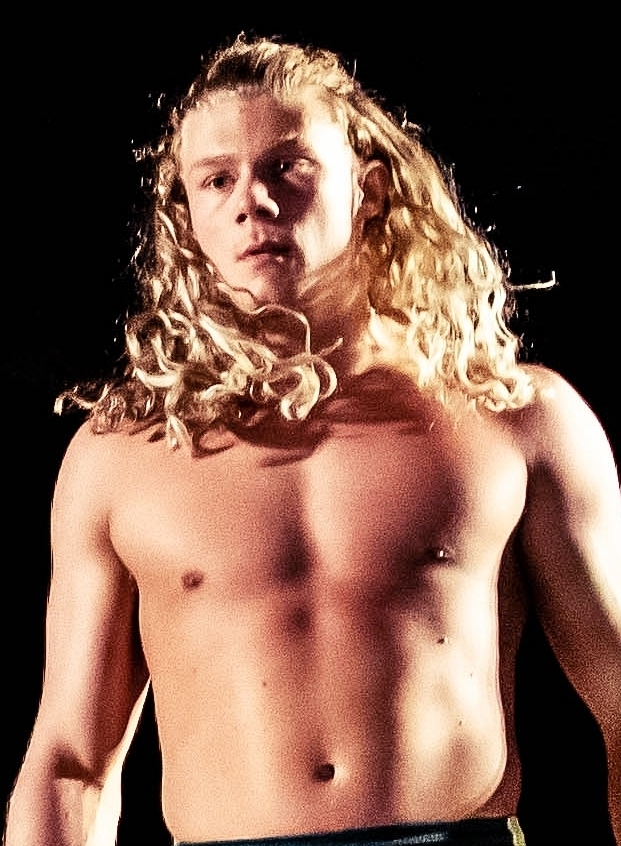
- Garrison in September 2022

Personal information
- Born: Garrett Griffith Austell, Georgia, U.S.
- Education: Guilford College

Professional wrestling career
- Ring name(s): Garrett Griffith; Griff Garrison
- Billed height: 6 ft 3 in (191 cm)
- Billed weight: 202 lb (92 kg)
- Trained by: LaBron Kozone
- Debut: October 30, 2016

Garrett Griffith is an American professional wrestler. He is signed to All Elite Wrestling (AEW) and its sister promotion Ring of Honor (ROH) under the ring name Griff Garrison.

== Early life ==
Garrison was born in Austell, Georgia, relocating to North Carolina as a youth. He attended North Davidson High School in Welcome, North Carolina, graduating in 2016. While in high school he played American football as a wide receiver. He went on to attend Guilford College in Greensboro, North Carolina, graduating in 2020 with a bachelor's degree in education and history. During his time at Guilford College, he played American football for the Guilford Quakers.

== Professional wrestling career ==
=== Early career (2016–2020) ===
Garrison was trained by LaBron Kozone, debuting in 2016. He initially wrestled for Fire Star Pro Wrestling in his home state of North Carolina. He also appeared with promotions such as the Georgia-based Anarchy Wrestling and Southern Fried Championship Wrestling, winning a variety of championships. In 2019, he began appearing with Ring of Honor. From 2018 to 2020, Garrison teamed with his former schoolmate Markus Cross as "Master and the Machine".

=== All Elite Wrestling / Ring of Honor (2020–present) ===
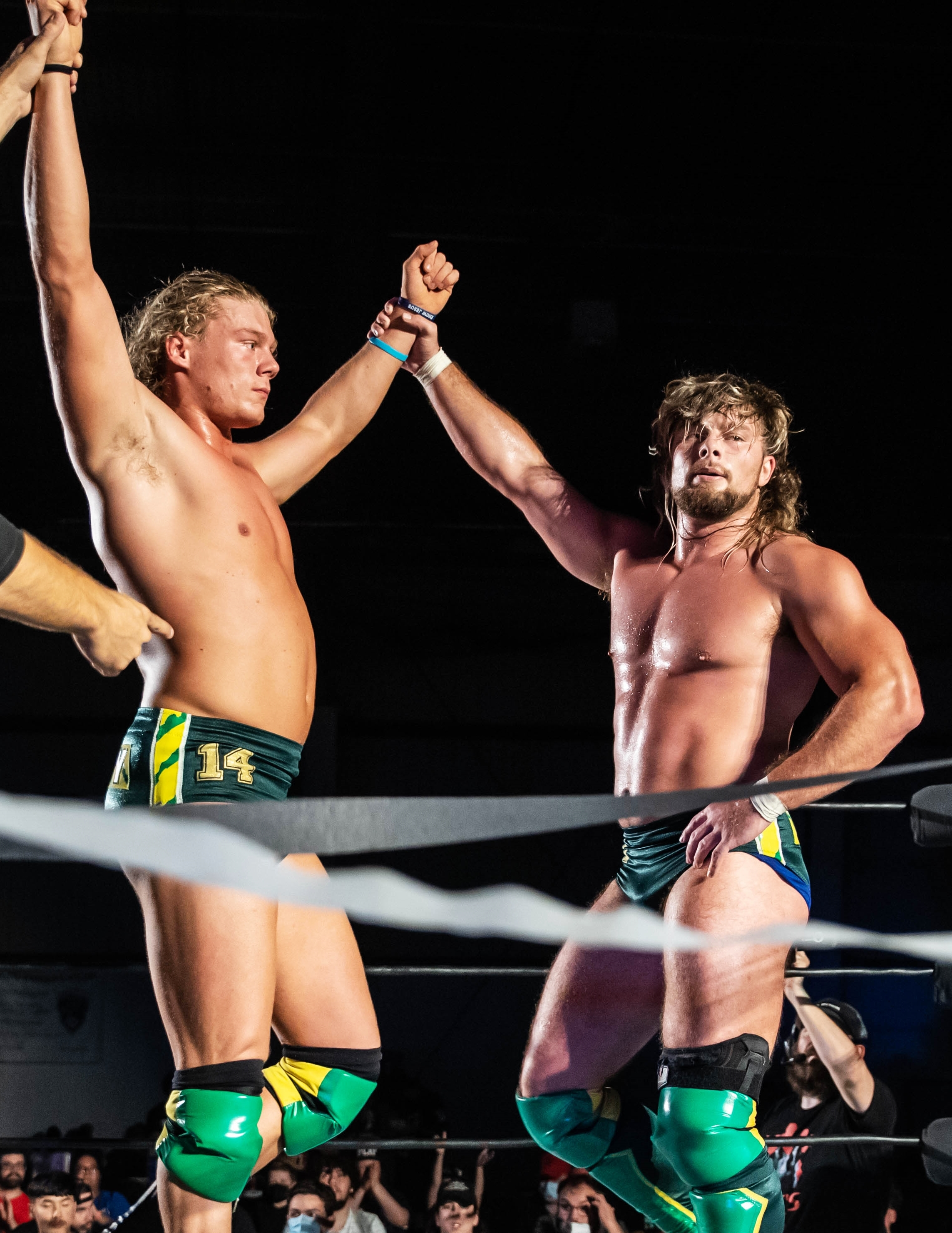
Garrison (left) and Brian Pillman Jr. (right) as the Varsity Blondes in September 2022.

In June 2020, Garrison began wrestling for All Elite Wrestling, appearing on AEW Dynamite and AEW Dark as a jobber. In July 2020, he was paired with Brian Pillman Jr., with the duo dubbed the "Varsity Blonds". The duo went on to compete in AEW's tag team division, competing against teams such as FTR, Private Party, Proud and Powerful, and Hybrid 2. In May 2021, they unsuccessfully challenged the Young Bucks for the AEW World Tag Team Championship. In the same month, Julia Hart joined Garrison and Pillman Jr. as their valet. In July 2021, Garrison and Pillman Jr. were signed to contracts with AEW. In December 2021, Garrison and Pillman Jr. began feuding with Malakai Black after he sprayed Black Mist in Hart's eyes; the feud culminated in a tag team bout pitting the Varsity Blonds against the Kings of the Black Throne (Malakai Black and Brody King) on the January 19, 2022 episode of Dynamite that was won by Black and King. The Varsity Blonds continued to team together until quietly disbanding in October 2022. In December 2022, Garrison underwent surgery for an undisclosed injury.

After over six months of inactivity, Garrison returned to the ring in June 2023 with Ring of Honor - now AEW's sister promotion - losing to Lee Moriarty on episode #15 of Ring of Honor Wrestling. In September 2023, Garrison formed a new tag team with Cole Karter, with Maria Kanellis as their valet. Garrison returned to AEW in October 2023, losing to Wardlow in a squash on an episode of Dynamite. In January 2024, Garrison lost to Adam Copeland on an episode of AEW Collision. In April 2024, Garrison unsuccessfully faced ROH World Champion Mark Briscoe in a "Proving Ground" match. At the ROH pay-per-view Death Before Dishonor in July 2024, Garrison teamed with Anthony Henry in a loss to the Infantry.

In February 2025, Garrison and Karter formed a stable, the "Frat House", with Jacked Jameson and Preston Vance. At Supercard of Honor in July 2025, Garrison, Karter, and Vance lost to The Dark Order. At Death Before Dishonor in August 2025, Garrison and Karter lost to MxM Collection in a three-way tag team match.

== Professional wrestling style and persona ==
Garrison's signature moves include the sleeper hold, spear, spinebuster, and Ivy League Destroyer.

== Championships and accomplishments ==
- Anarchy Wrestling
  - Anarchy Heavyweight Championship (2 times)
  - Anarchy Tag Team Championship (2 times) – with Ben Buchanan (1 time) and Marcus Kross (1 time)
- Fire Star Pro Wrestling
  - FSPW Heavyweight Championship (3 times)
  - FSPW Zone1 Platinum Championship (1 time)
- Pro Wrestling Illustrated
  - Ranked number 280 of the top 500 singles wrestlers in the PWI 500 in 2021
- Southern Fried Championship Wrestling
  - SFCW Heavyweight Championship (1 time)
  - SFCW Tag Team Championship (1 time) – with Marcus Kross
