= Final Battle (2024) =

2024 Ring of Honor streaming event

- Promotional poster featuring various wrestlers
- Promotion: Ring of Honor
- Date: December 20, 2024
- City: New York City, New York
- Venue: Hammerstein Ballroom
- Attendance: 1,491

Event chronology
← Previous; Death Before Dishonor	Next → Wrestle Dynasty

Final Battle chronology
← Previous; 2023	Next → 2025

The 2024 Final Battle was a professional wrestling live streaming event produced by American promotion Ring of Honor (ROH). It was the 23rd Final Battle event and took place on December 20, 2024, at the Hammerstein Ballroom in New York City, New York. The event aired exclusively on ROH's streaming service, Honor Club.

Thirteen matches were contested at the event, including four on the Zero Hour pre-show. In the event's final match, which was promoted as part of a double main event, Athena defeated Billie Starkz to retain the ROH Women's World Championship. In the other main event, Chris Jericho defeated Matt Cardona to retain the ROH World Championship. In other prominent matches, Komander defeated Brian Cage, Willie Mack, Mark Davis, AR Fox and Blake Christian in a Survival of the Fittest match to become the new ROH World Television Champion, Sons of Texas (Sammy Guevara and Dustin Rhodes) defeated The Righteous (Vincent and Dutch) in a Texas Bullrope match to retain the ROH World Tag Team Championship, Lee Moriarty defeated Nigel McGuiness to retain the ROH Pure Championship, and Jay Lethal defeated QT Marshall. The event marked the ROH returns of Danhausen, Nigel McGuinness, and Bandido.

== Production ==
=== Background ===
Final Battle is a professional wrestling event produced by Ring of Honor. First held in 2002, it is traditionally ROH's last show in the calendar year. It is widely regarded as Ring of Honor's premiere flagship event, similar to WWE's WrestleMania. On November 19, 2024, ROH announced that the 2024 Final Battle would be held at the Hammerstein Ballroom in New York City on December 20, and would air exclusively on Honor Club. Once a yearly tradition, this was the first Final Battle event to take place at the Hammerstein Ballroom since Final Battle 2018.

=== Storylines ===
The event featured professional wrestling matches that involved different wrestlers from pre-existing scripted feuds and storylines. Wrestlers portrayed villains, heroes, or less distinguishable characters in scripted events that build tension and culminated in a wrestling match or series of matches. Storylines were produced on ROH's weekly series ROH Honor Club TV exclusively on their streaming service Honor Club, on television programs of sister promotion All Elite Wrestling including Dynamite, Rampage, and Collision, and via promotional videos on both the ROH and AEW YouTube channels.

On the December 5 episode of ROH Honor Club TV, ROH World Champion Chris Jericho hosted his talk show segment, "TV Time with The Learning Tree," for the first time on ROH to discuss his upcoming title defense at Final Battle. He would dare anyone from New York to step up, to which Matt Cardona would then make a surprise appearance and accept Jericho's challenge for the title at Final Battle.

On the November 14 ROH Honor Club TV, after ROH World Tag Team Champions The Sons of Texas (Dustin Rhodes and Sammy Guevara) competed in a match, they were suddenly ambushed by The Righteous (Vincent and Dutch), who wielded a bull rope with an attached cowbell. Later in the night, after The Righteous won their match, they cut a promo, declaring they should've been champions long ago and that attacking the champions would force them to get an opportunity. Dutch specifically targeted Rhodes as he recounted training with his father Dusty Rhodes, who Dutch claimed saw more in him than he did Dustin, which was how he came to possess the bull rope. The Righteous continued the mind games over the next few weeks. Soon, on the December 5 ROH Honor Club TV, it was announced that The Sons of Texas would face The Righteous in a Texas Bullrope match for the ROH World Tag Team Championship at Final Battle.

On the December 5 episode of ROH Honor Club TV, Jay Lethal appeared in a backstage segment where he was planning a return to ROH, one and a half years after his last appearance at 2022's Death Before Dishonor. He and his associates (Sonjay Dutt, Satnam Singh, Jeff Jarrett, and Karen Jarrett) were then met by Q. T. Marshall, who offered to be Lethal's return opponent, but was shot down as Lethal wanted to wrestle a "bigger name." The following week, Lethal met with ROH Board of Directors member Paul Wight to discuss his ROH return match only for a furious Marshall to interrupt, leading to a physical altercation. Wight would intervene and decide it would be best that the two would settle differences in the ring, with the match being made official for Final Battle.

At the previous year's Final Battle, Athena retained the ROH Women's World Championship over Billie Starkz, the latter's performance getting her back in the former's good graces as her "minion". Starkz would then take to using Athena's underhanded tactics as, at Supercard of Honor, she became the inaugural ROH World Women's Television Champion by defeating Queen Aminata in a tournament final, where she faked a neck injury towards the end of the bout. She and fellow minion, backstage interviewer Lexy Nair, would then assist Athena in retaining her title against Aminata at Death Before Dishonor. However, after Starkz lost the television title to Red Velvet at the same event, the dynamic between Athena, Starkz, and Nair reverted to Athena favoring the latter and looking down on Starkz. On the October 24 ROH Honor Club TV, Athena celebrated becoming the longest-reigning champion of any kind in ROH history, where she again praised Nair and berated Starkz for perceived poor party planning, causing Starkz to walk out. Over a month later on December 12, Athena and Starkz competed in a four-way qualifier for the International Women’s Cup at Wrestle Dynasty, also involving Velvet and Leyla Hirsch. Initially, Athena demanded Starkz lay down for her, but when that didn't happen, Athena would steal a pin on Velvet from Starkz to win. Afterwards, Athena proclaimed she would skip Final Battle in preparation for Wrestle Dynasty, but a frustrated Starkz, tired of Athena's abuse, challenged her to a rematch for the ROH Women's World Championship at Final Battle. Athena accepted, and the match was later made official.

== Results ==
No.	Results	Stipulations	Times
1^{P}	Grizzled Young Veterans (James Drake and Zack Gibson) defeated The Dark Order (Alex Reynolds and John Silver) (with Evil Uno) by pinfall	Tag team match	11:26
2^{P}	Hanako defeated Harley Cameron by pinfall	Singles match	7:19
3^{P}	The Undisputed Kingdom (Matt Taven and Mike Bennett) defeated The Infantry (Carlie Bravo and Capt. Shawn Dean) (with Trish Adora and Shane Taylor) by pinfall	Tag team match	9:56
4^{P}	Gates of Agony (Bishop Kaun and Toa Liona) defeated LEEJ (Lee Johnson and EJ Nduka) by pinfall	Tag team match	10:21
5	Atlantis Jr. defeated Mansoor (with Mason Madden) by pinfall	Singles match	11:58
6	Katsuyori Shibata defeated Tommy Billington by submission	Singles match	9:49
7	Jay Lethal (with Karen Jarrett and Sonjay Dutt) defeated Q. T. Marshall (with Aaron Solo and Carolyn Fazio) by pinfall	Singles match	12:40
8	Red Velvet (c) defeated Leyla Hirsch by pinfall	Singles match for the ROH Women's World Television Championship	11:49
9	Lee Moriarty (c) defeated Nigel McGuinness by submission	Pure Wrestling Rules match for the ROH Pure Championship; Christopher Daniels, Jerry Lynn, and Rocky Romero served as the judges.	17:04
10	The Sons of Texas (Dustin Rhodes and Sammy Guevara) (c) defeated The Righteous (Vincent and Dutch) by pinfall	Texas Bullrope match for the ROH World Tag Team Championship	15:32
11	Komander (with Alex Abrahantes) defeated Brian Cage (c), Willie Mack, Mark Davis, AR Fox, and Blake Christian by pinfall	Survival of the Fittest match for the ROH World Television Championship	25:18
12	Chris Jericho (c) (with Bryan Keith) defeated Matt Cardona by pinfall	Singles match for the ROH World Championship	18:27
13	Athena (c) (with Lexy Nair) defeated Billie Starkz by pinfall	Singles match for the ROH Women's World Championship	25:34
(c) / – the champion(s) heading into the match; P / – the match was broadcast on the pre-show

=== ROH World Television Championship Survival of the Fittest match ===
Eliminated	Wrestler	Eliminated by	Method of elimination	Time
1	Willie Mack	Brian Cage	Pinned after the Tornado Claw	9:29
2	AR Fox	Brian Cage	Pinned after an avalanche powerbomb	13:26
3	Brian Cage (c)	Mark Davis	Pinned after a piledriver	16:26
4	Mark Davis	Blake Christian	Pinned after a low blow	17:01
5	Blake Christian	Komander	Pinned after Cielito Lindo	25:18
Winner	Komander	—N/a		25:18

== See also ==
- 2024 in professional wrestling
- List of Ring of Honor pay-per-view events
