= The Minions (professional wrestling) =

Professional wrestling stable

Stable
- Leader: Athena
- Members: Billie Starkz; Diamante
- Name(s): The Minions; M.I.T.
- Former members: Lexy Nair (valet)
- Debut: September 21, 2023
- Years active: 2023–present

The Minions (also known as M.I.T.) is a villainous professional wrestling stable, consisting of leader Athena, Billie Starkz, and Diamante. They are signed to All Elite Wrestling and Ring of Honor (ROH). Athena is the reigning ROH Women's World Championship, with her reign being the longest in the title's history and is the longest-reigning champion in ROH history.

== History ==
=== Ring of Honor / All Elite Wrestling (2023–present) ===
On the September 21, 2023 edition of Ring of Honor Wrestling, ROH Women's World Champion Athena, Billie Starkz & Lexy Nair formed a stable known as The Minions. In October 2023 at AEW's pay-per-view WrestleDream Athena and Billie Starkz of The Minions teamed up with Keith Lee, and Satoshi Kojima to face Shane Taylor Promotions Shane Taylor and Lee Moriarty who teamed with Diamante and Mercedes Martinez in an eight-person mixed tag team match and were successful. Athena became the mentor of Billie Starkz and Lexy Nair, with Starkz and Nair becoming her 'minions'. On the November 23 episode of ROH Honor Club TV, Athena and Starkz lost to Ronda Rousey and Marina Shafir. On the following episode of ROH Wrestling, Starkz defeated Shafir in a one-on-one match, with Starkz proceeded to attack Shafir after the match. Athena and Nair come out and feigned announcing that Starkz had graduated from 'minion training'. Athena then announced that only Nair was the valedictorian. This led to a match between Athena and Starkz for the ROH Women's World Championship at Final Battle, where Athena would retain.

On April 5, 2024, Billie Starkz became the inaugural ROH Women's TV champion by defeating Queen Aminata at ROH pay-per-view Supercard of Honor. On July 26, 2024, at Death Before Dishonor Athena took on Queen Aminata for the ROH Women's World Championship as the two already had a long anticipated feud months prior, during the match Athena was successful as Lexy Nair gave Athena a microphone that she demanded and hit Aminata with then finished her off from the distraction retaining the title after Red Velvet (Newly crowned ROH Women's World Television Championship who defeated Billie Starkz for it earlier during that night.) came to Aminata's aid by chasing after and brawling with Billie Starkz as Lexy Nair recuperated somewhat playing a role in Athena's stable with Billie Starkz against Aminata & Red Velvet as The Minions. Days after the pay-per-view Athena & Billie Starkz faces Queen Aminata & Red Velvet in a tag team match but Queen Aminata & Red Velvet were unsuccessful as Athena blinded Queen Aminata while Billie Starkz finished off Red Velvet and then pinned her. On the December 26, 2024 episode of Ring of Honor Lexy Nair was dismissed from the group as Athena said M.I.T is only her and Starkz from now on as Lexy was expelled.

On July 12, 2025, at ROH's sister promotion All Elite Wrestling (AEW)'s event All In, Athena entered and won the women's Casino Gauntlet match to earn a shot at the AEW Women's World Championship at any time she wants.

On September 5, 2025, M.I.T. member Athena hit a fourth Milestone as ROH Women's World Champion by hitting 1000-days as champion.

In March 2025 Athena recruited another member to the group by the name of Diamante. From that point Diamante has helped Athena & Billie Starkz in their alliance even managing Athena at Final Battle. On January 31, 2026, at Global Wars Metroplex Athena, Billie and Diamante as The Minions teamed to face their latest rivals Maya World, Hyan, and Deonna Purrazzo in the main event in Six-woman tag team action but we're unsuccessful.

== Members ==
*	Founding member
L	Leader
V	Valet

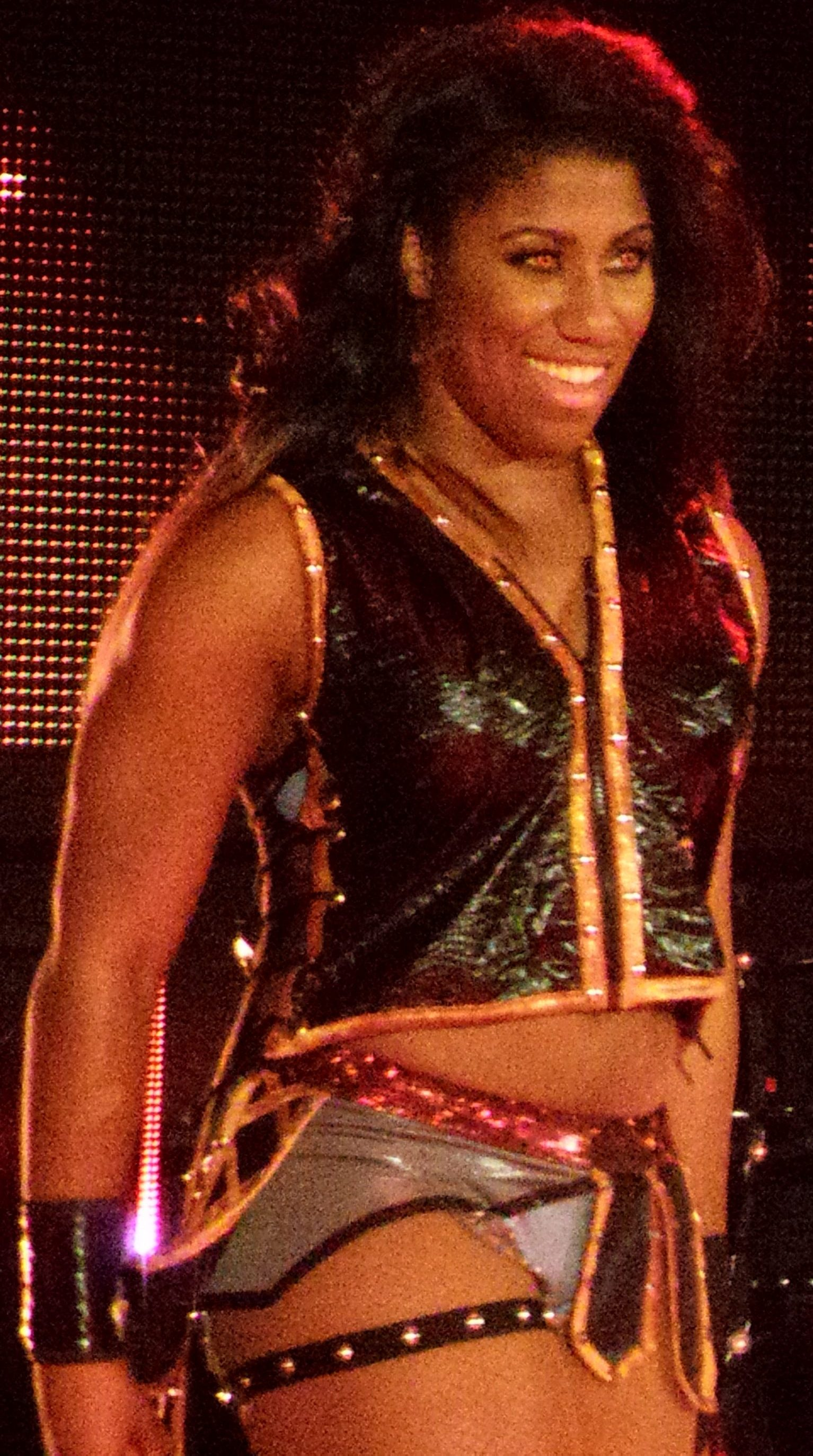
Athena (*L)

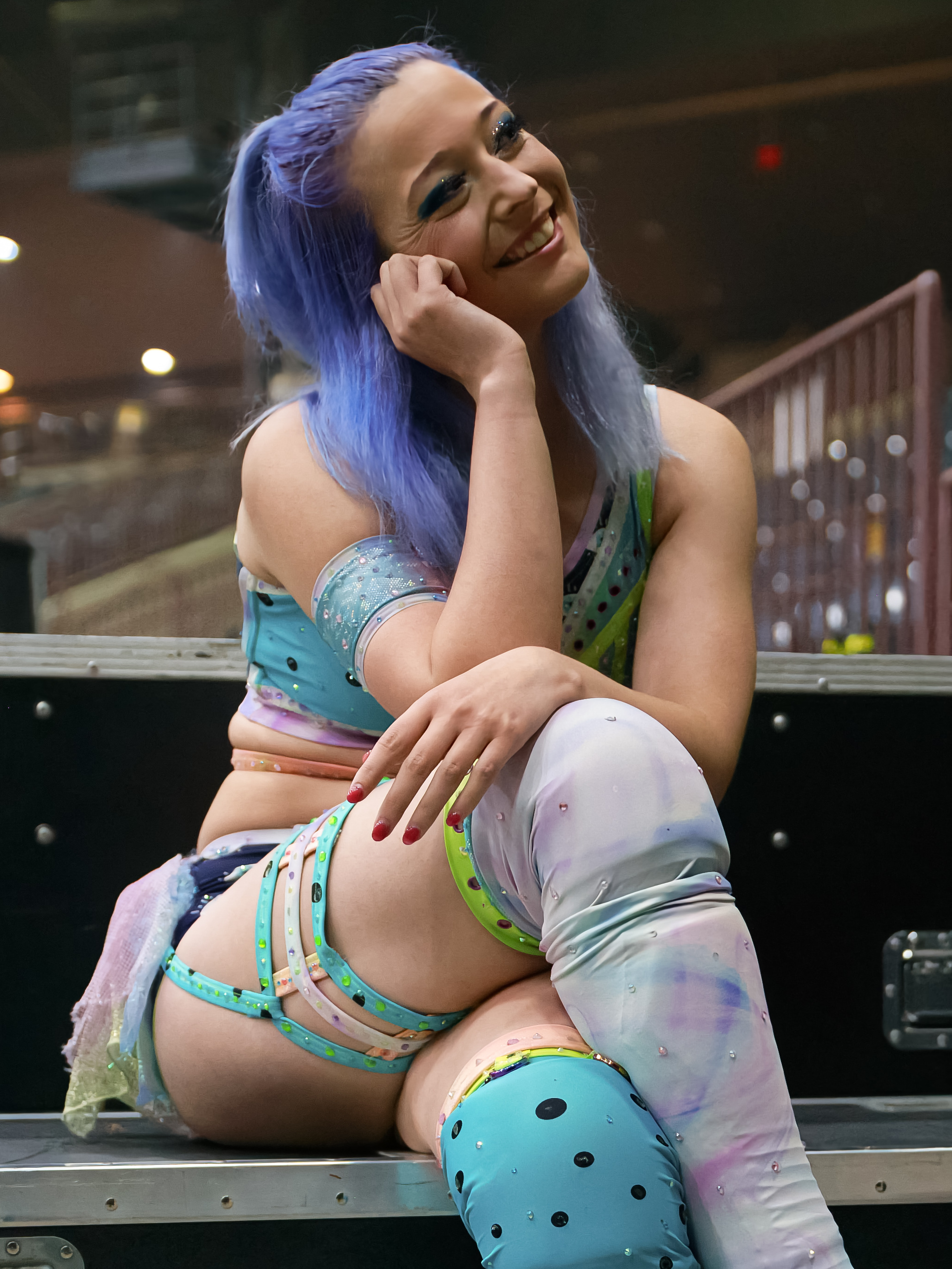
Billie Starkz (*)

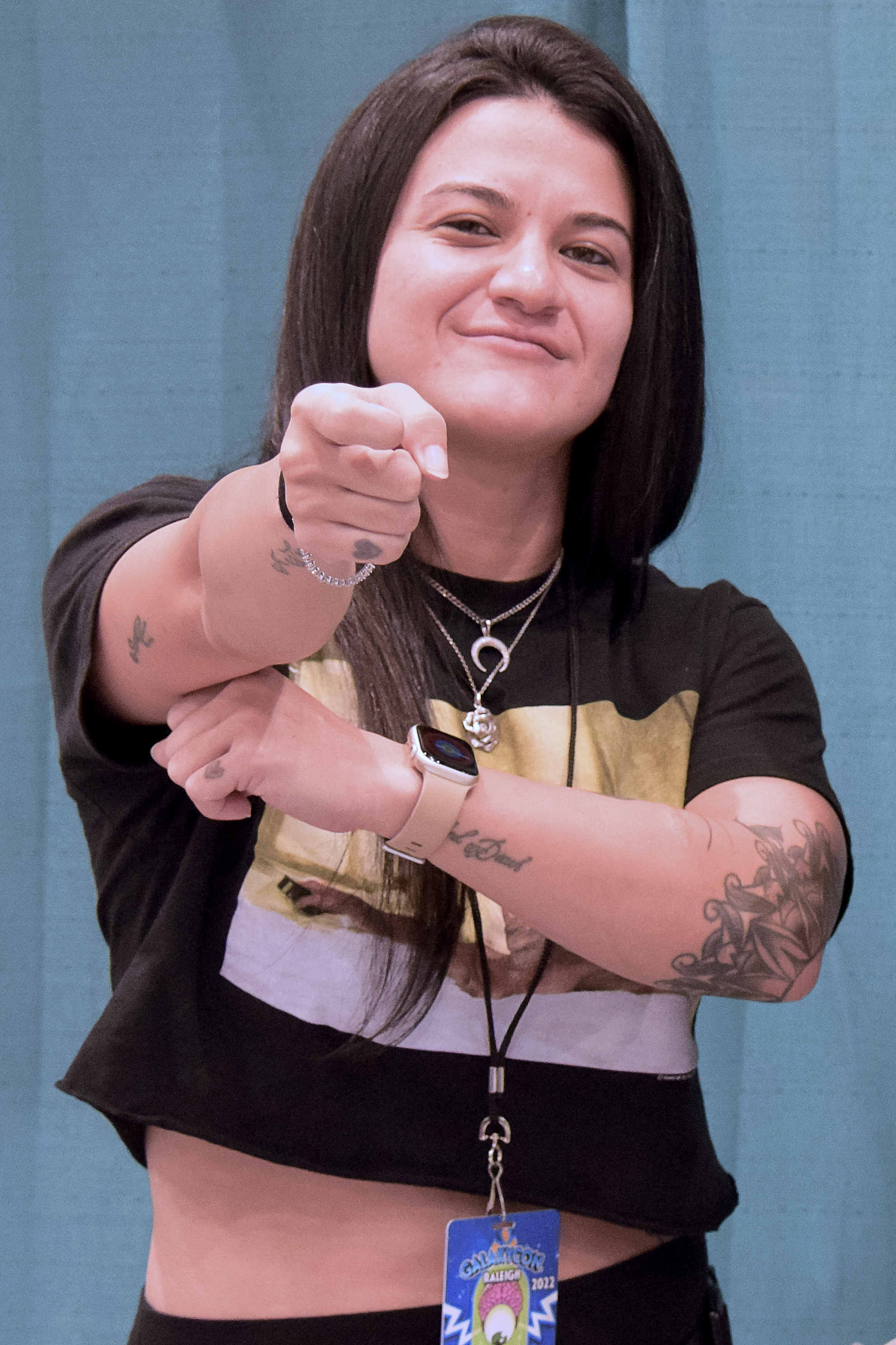
Diamante

=== Current ===
Member		Joined
Athena	*L	September 21, 2023
Billie Starkz	*	September 21, 2023
Diamante		March 27, 2025

=== Former ===
Member		Joined	Left
Lexy Nair	*V	September 21, 2023	December 26, 2024

== Championships and accomplishments ==
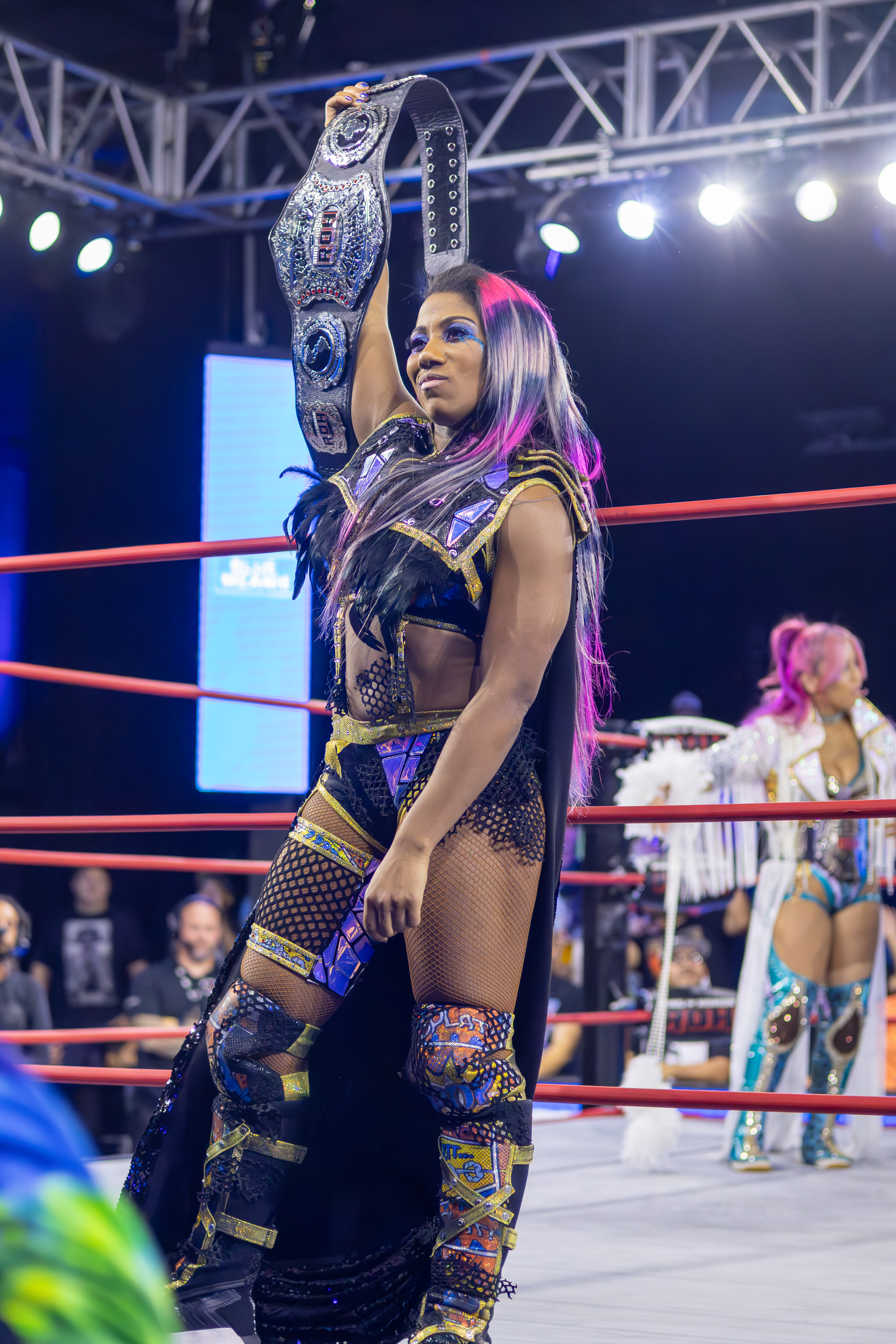
Athena is a one-time and longest reigning ROH Women's World Champion, and longest-reigning champion in ROH history

- All Elite Wrestling
  - Casino Gauntlet match (2025) – Athena
- Game Changer Wrestling
  - JCW World Championship (1 time) – Billie Starkz
- Girl Fight
  - Girl Fight Championship (1 time, current) – Billie Starkz
- Ring of Honor
  - ROH Women's World Championship (1 time, current) – Athena
  - ROH Women's World Television Championship (1 time, inaugural) – Billie Starkz
  - Women's Survival of the Fittest (2026) (1 time, inaugural) – Athena
- Spark Joshi Puroresu of America
  - Spark Joshi World Championship (1 time) – Billie Starkz

== See also ==
- The Infantry
