= Final Battle (2023) =

2023 Ring of Honor pay-per-view

- Promotional poster featuring various wrestlers
- Promotion: Ring of Honor
- Date: December 15, 2023
- City: Garland, Texas
- Venue: Curtis Culwell Center
- Attendance: 1,964

Event chronology
← Previous; Death Before Dishonor	Next → Supercard of Honor

Final Battle chronology
← Previous; 2022	Next → 2024

The 2023 Final Battle was a professional wrestling pay-per-view event produced by American promotion Ring of Honor (ROH). It was the 22nd Final Battle event and took place on December 15, 2023 at the Curtis Culwell Center in Garland, Texas. The event exclusively aired on HonorClub and was the first Final Battle event since 2007 not to feature an ROH World Championship match on the card.

Fourteen matches were contested at the event, with four on the Zero-Hour pre-show. In the main event, Athena defeated Billie Starkz to retain the ROH Women's World Championship. In other prominent matches, Dem Top Guys (FTR (Cash Wheeler and Dax Harwood) and Mark Briscoe) defeated Blackpool Combat Club (Bryan Danielson, Jon Moxley and Claudio Castagnoli) in a Jay Briscoe Memorial Fight Without Honor, Kyle Fletcher defeated Komander, Bryan Keith, Lee Moriarty, Dalton Castle, and Lee Johnson in a Survival of the Fittest elimination match to win the vacant ROH World Television Championship, Ethan Page defeated Tony Nese in an "I Quit" match and in the opening contest, El Hijo del Vikingo defeated Black Taurus to retain the AAA Mega Championship.

== Production ==
=== Background ===
Final Battle is a professional wrestling event produced by Ring of Honor. First held in 2002, it is traditionally ROH's last show in the calendar year. It is widely regarded as Ring of Honor's premiere flagship event, similar to WWE's WrestleMania. On October 18, 2023, ROH announced that Final Battle would be held at the Curtis Culwell Center in Garland, Texas on December 15 and would air exclusively on HonorClub.

=== Storylines ===
The event featured professional wrestling matches that involve different wrestlers from pre-existing scripted feuds and storylines. Wrestlers portray villains, heroes, or less distinguishable characters in scripted events that build tension and culminate in a wrestling match or series of matches. Storylines will be produced on ROH's weekly series ROH Honor Club TV exclusively on their streaming service Honor Club, on television programs of sister promotion All Elite Wrestling including Dynamite, Rampage, and Collision, and via promotional videos on both the ROH and AEW YouTube channels.

On the November 8 episode of Dynamite, Samoa Joe vacated the ROH World Television Championship in order to challenge for the AEW World Championship. On the following ROH Honor Club TV episode, ROH president Tony Khan announced the return of the Survival of the Fittest tournament to crown a new champion, with qualifying matches taking place over the next several weeks, as the finals would take place at Final Battle. The first two men to qualify were Dalton Castle and Komander, who defeated Evil Uno and Gringo Loco respectively. Kyle Fletcher, Lee Moriarty and Lee Johnson later qualified by beating Gravity, Josh Woods and Tracy Williams respectively. On the December 14 episode of ROH Honor Club TV, Tony Khan announced that the sixth and final competitor in the Survival of the Fittest final would be revealed at Final Battle.

On the December 2 episode of AEW Collision, interviewer Lexy Nair asked Keith Lee who he was referring to on the past week's Collision when Lee mentioning wanting to face "him". As Lee was about to speak, Shane Taylor walked up and said that their tag team match at last year's Final Battle, where Lee and Swerve Strickland defeated Taylor and JD Griffey, didn't solve their issues. Taylor then challenged Lee to a match for Final Battle, which Lee accepted.

For several weeks, "Smart" Mark Sterling scouted Ethan Page as a potential client, but Page repeatedly turned down his invitation. Page had been on a five-match winning streak before wrestling Sterling's client Tony Nese on the October 19 episode of ROH Honor Club TV, which he lost due to Sterling's interference. They would have a rematch a month later, where Sterling again tried to interfere but was ejected from ringside, allowing Page to win the match. However, when Page tried to display the "Code of Honor" to Nese via handshake, Nese attacked him and the two got into a pul-apart brawl. The following week, Sterling demanded one more match between Page and Nese at Final Battle from ROH Board of Directors member Jerry Lynn, which Page accepted. Lynn made it official and allowed for Sterling to be present at ringside on the condition he'd be handcuffed to the ring post. The contract signing for the match took place the week after, mediated by Tony Khan, where Sterling told Page that it would be an "I Quit" match. After Nese and Page signed the contract, Sterling threw protein powder into Page's eyes before Nese put him through a table. The match was then made official for Final Battle.

On the December 7 episode of ROH Honor Club TV, the Blackpool Combat Club's (BCC) Bryan Danielson and ROH Pure Champion Wheeler Yuta were part of a backstage segment. There, Danielson recalled his match at 2003's Final Battle against the late Jay Briscoe, the only singles match the two men ever had. He then recounted last year's Final Battle, where Jay had his final match, in which he and his brother Mark Briscoe defeated FTR (Cash Wheeler and Dax Harwood) in a Double Dog Collar match to win their record thirteenth ROH World Tag Team Championship. Ultimately, Danielson would challenge Mark and FTR to face the BCC (Danielson, Claudio Castagnoli, and Jon Moxley) in a Jay Briscoe Memorial six-man tag team match, which was made official.

Starting in mid-September, Athena became the mentor of Billie Starkz and Lexy Nair, with the latter pair becoming her 'minions' and forming the stable M.I.T.. However, it was clear that Athena favored Nair over Starkz, as the former consistently helped them win matches while the latter often took the fall when they lost. On the November 23 episode of ROH Honor Club TV, Starkz and Athena lost to Ronda Rousey and Marina Shafir, with Rousey submitting Starkz. On the following week's episode, Starkz redeemed herself after defeating Shafir before she proceeded to attack her after the match. Athena and Nair come out and feign that Nair and Starkz had graduated from "minion training," before Athena revealed that only Nair had graduated. Starkz then got upset and attacked Athena. Starkz then met Tony Khan backstage and requested a championship match with Athena, which Khan accepted. The match was then made for Final Battle.

== Event ==
Other on-screen personnel
Role:	Name:
Commentators	Ian Riccaboni (Pre-show and PPV)
Commentators	Caprice Coleman (Pre-show and PPV)
Ring announcer	Bobby Cruise
Backstage interviewer	Lexy Nair

=== Zero-Hour ===
There were four matches that took place on the Zero-Hour pre-show. In the opener, Taya Valkyrie (accompanied by Johnny TV) faced Jazmin Allure. In the closing stages, Valkyrie delivered a big boot and a sliding German suplex to Allure. Valkyrie then performed a superplex and a foot stomp to Allure and pinned her to win.

Next, The Von Erichs (Ross Von Erich and Marshall Von Erich) faced The Outrunners (Truth Magnum and Turbo Floyd). In the closing stages, Marshall delivered clotheslines to Magnum and Floyd. Marshall and Ross then delivered a double hip toss to Magnum and then applied stereo Iron Claws to Magnum and Floyd, forcing The Outrunners to tap out. After the match, Kevin Von Erich came out to applaud his sons.

The next match was a Survival of the Fittest qualifying match contested between Bryan Keith and Jack Cartwheel. In the closing stages, Cartwheel delivered a standing moonsault for a two-count. Cartwheel then performed a neckbreaker and the Spiccoli Driver for a two-count. Keith then delivered a jumping knee and a Tiger Driver to secure the victory.

In the Zero-Hour main event, Daniel Garcia faced Blake Christian. In the closing stages, Garcia delivered a butterfly suplex to Christian. Christian then landed two backbreakers and a springboard forearm to Garcia for a two-count. Christian then landed a running Spanish Fly on Garcia for a nearfall. Christian then landed a 450° splash on Garcia for a nearfall. Garcia then locked in the Dragon Tamer on Christian, forcing Christian to submit.

=== Preliminary matches ===
The pay-per-view opened with a AAA Mega Championship match between defending champion El Hijo del Vikingo and Black Taurus. In the opening stages, Taurus delivered a reverse slingblade, a crucifix driver and a pop-up Samoan Drop to Vikingo for a two-count. Vikingo then landed a spinning heel kick, an enzeguiri and a 450° headscissors on Taurus for a two-count. Vikingo then delivered a Canadian Destroyer and a twisting 450° splash to Taurus for a two-count. Taurus then performed an overhead belly-to-belly suplex and an avalanche gorilla press for a two-count. Vikingo delivered a crucifix driver, but Taurus responded immediately with a spear. Vikingo delivered a 630° Denton to Taurus on the outside. Taurus performed a discus lariat for a nearfall. As Taurus lifted Vikingo onto his shoulders, Vikingo countered it into a crucifix driver and performed a poison Rana, running corner double knees and a 630° senton to retain his title.

The next match was for the ROH World Six-Man Tag Team Championship contested between defending champions The Mogul Embassy (Bishop Kaun, Toa Liona and Brian Cage) (accompanied by Prince Nana) and TMDK (Kosei Fujita, Bad Dude Tito and Shane Haste). In the closing stages, Tito delivered a satellite DDT to Liona for a two-count. Haste attempted a brainbuster but countered it into a uranage and delivered a slingshot spear. Fujita delivered a slingshot dropkick to Kaun for a two-count. Tito delivered a Death Valley Driver to Cage, bur Cage then performed a pumphandle driver. Liona, Kaun and Cage then delivered an assisted powerbomb to Fujita, with Cage getting the pin.

The next match was an "I Quit" match between Tony Nese and Ethan Page, with "Smart" Mark Sterling handcuffed to the ring post. In the opening stages, Sterling attempted to throw powder into Page's eyes, but Page blocked and Sterling inadvertently threw the powder into Nese's eyes. Nese then delivered the Running Kneese to Page in the steel steps, but Page refuses to say I Quit. Nese then delivered another Running Kneese to Page in the steel steps. Page performed a springboard clothesline to Page from the guard rail and attempted to hit Page with a weight plate, but Page ducked. Nese then set up a pair of tables and attempted to send Page through them, but Page landed a rope-hung stunner and an Ace Crusher to Nese through the tables. Nese refused to quit. Page attempted an avalanche powerslam to Nese, but Nese countered it into a hurricarana. Nese then grabbed the keys to the handcuffs and released Sterling. Nese then attempted to hit Page with the weight plate until the returning Scorpio Sky appeared and attacked Sterling. Page then performed a running dropkick to Nese with Nese's hands stuck under the weight plate, allowing Page to deliver a DDT to Nese onto the plate. Page then hit Sterling with the weight plate and delivered the Ego's Edge to him. Nese then tied Page's hands behind his back and forced him to say I Quit, but Page responded with "Fuck You". Page then landed a big boot, allowing the referee to untie his hands. Page then smashed a chair into Nese's face and choked Nese with a chain. Nese then said "I Quit", thus ending the match and Page was declared the winner.

Next, Nyla Rose faced VertVixen. In the closing stages, VertVixen landed a double stomp. VertVixen attempted a jumping arm drag, but Rose impeded with a spinebuster for a two-count. Rose then performed a running knee strike and the Beast Bomb and pinned VertVixen to win the match.

The next match was the Survival of the Fittest finals for the vacant ROH World Television Championship contested between Kyle Fletcher, Komander (accompanied by Alex Abrahantes), Bryan Keith, Lee Moriarty, Dalton Castle (accompanied by The Boys (Brandon Tate and Brent Tate)), and Lee Johnson. In the opening stages, Moriarty delivered a suicide dive to Castle. Komander then delivered a tight-rope twisting plancha to everyone on the outside. Castle delivered a lariat to Komander, Keith delivered an enzeguiri to Castle and Johnson performed a Spiccoli Driver and a standing moonsault to Keith. Moriarty then landed The Fang and locked in the Border City Stretch on Johnson, forcing Johnson to tap out and thus, he was eliminated. Johnny TV then came out to distract Castle, allowing Moriarty to land another The Fang on Castle to eliminate him. Keith performed a running enzuigiri to Moriarty and an Ushigoroshi for a two-count. Keith then landed the Tiger Driver on Moriarty and pinned him to eliminate him. Komander delivered a satellite DDT to Keith. Keith attempted another Tiger Driver to Fletcher, but Fletcher countered it into a Grimstone and pinned him and thus Keith was eliminated. Fletcher and Komander were the final two men. Fletcher landed an enzuigiri and a tombstone piledriver to Komander on the apron. Fletcher then landed a brainbuster to Komander for a nearfall. Komander then performed a springboard Canadian Destroyer and a tight-rope 450° splash to Fletcher on the apron for a nearfall. As Komander attempted a tight-rope shooting star press, Fletcher blocked him and delivered a brainbuster onto the turbuckles for another nearfall. Fletcher then delivered a Grimstone and pinned Komander to win the ROH World Television Championship.

The next match was for the ROH Pure Championship contested under Pure Wrestling Rules, with Christopher Daniels, Jimmy Jacobs and Jerry Lynn serving as the judges. The competitors were defending champion Wheeler Yuta and challenger Tom Lawlor. In the closing stages, Lawlor delivered a hip toss and a spear to Yuta for a two-count. Lawlor then delivered a PK and a hammerlock piledriver to Yuta for another two-count. Yuta then locked in a single leg crab, bur Lawlor escaped and delivered an exploder suplex. Lawlor locked in an ankle lock, but Yuta reversed it into a German suplex for a two-count. Lawlor locked in a Kimura Lock, but Yuta reversed into a seatbelt pin (with Lawlor's shoulders off the mat) for the win. After the match, Yuta performed a low blow to Lawlor. Hook then came out to aid Lawlor. Yuta attacked Hook and landed a DDT and walked away.

Next, Keith Lee faced Shane Taylor. In the closing stages, Taylor landed a diving crossbody and the Tower of London on Lee for a two-count. Taylor performed a leg drop to Lee on the apron for another two-count. As Lee attempted to land a moonsault on Taylor, Lee Moriarty came out, bur Lee then delivered a Spirit Bomb to Moriarty. Taylor delivered a running knee strike and a Canadian Destroyer to Lee for a nearfall. Taylor landed a forearm smash, but Lee then landed the Big Bang Catastrophe and pinned Taylor to win. After the match, Lee embraced Taylor.

Next, Dem Top Guys (Mark Briscoe and FTR (Cash Wheeler and Dax Harwood)) faced Blackpool Combat Club (Bryan Danielson, Jon Moxley and Claudio Castagnoli). In the opening stages, Claudio delivered the Giant Swing to Harwood. Harwood delivered a German Suplex to Claudio for a two-count. Mark landed a dropkick to Danielson and a Ghetto Buster to Claudio. Harwood, Wheeler and Mark then performed a superplex/diving splash/Froggy Bow combination on Danielson for a nearfall. Mark and Wheeler then delivered the Shatter Machine to Moxley, but Danielson came in with the Busaiku Knee on Wheeler. Claudio then performed a pop-up European uppercut and the Neutralizer to Mark for a two-count. FTR then landed a Super Shatter Machine on Claudio and all six men fought on the outside, which resulted in a double countout. Mark then said that the match will be restarted and it will be a Fight Without Honor. Mark then landed a chair-assisted diving senton to the Blackpool Combat Club. Moxley then stabbed Wheeler in the eye with a fork. Danielson locked in the LeBell Lock on Wheeler with a barbed wire, while Moxley choked Harwood with a barbed wire. Claudio then set up a table on the outside and Wheeler speared Claudio through it. Harwood then delivered a piledriver to Moxley through a table filled with thumbtacks. Danielson attempted the Busaiku Knee, bur Mark moved out of the way and delivered the Jay Driller to Danielson onto a pile of chairs. After the match, FTR & Mark Briscoe embraced each other.

The penultimate match was a Proving Ground match between ROH World Champion Eddie Kingston and Anthony Henry. If Henry could last 10 minutes, then he got a future ROH World Championship match. In the closing stages, Henry delivered a running enzeguiri to Kingston in the guard rail. Henry then landed a bridging German suplex and a piledriver to Kingston for a two-count. Kingston then landed a spinning back fist and a half-and-half suplex on Henry and locked in a Stretch Plum submission, forcing Henry to submit. Henry didn't last 10 minutes, so he didn't get a title match.

=== Main event ===
In the main event, Athena defended the ROH Women's World Championship against Billie Starkz. In the opening stages, Starkz delivered a dropkick to Athena. Athena then hit Starkz's head onto the guard rail multiple times. Starkz then landed a snap suplex to Athena into the turbuckles. Starkz then landed a dragon suplex, but Athena responded with a headbutt. Starkz delivered a rewind kick to Athena, removed Athena's protective mask and delivered forearm smashes onto her face. Starkz then delivered multiple clotheslines and a facebuster for a two-count. Starkz delivered a spinning back kick and a swanton bomb to Athena for a nearfall. Starkz delivered a suicide dive to Athena to the outside, but Athena responded with a shotgun dropkick to Starkz into the guard rail. Athena attempted to our Starkz through the announce table, but Starkz blocked it and landed a suplex to Athena onto the floor. Athena performed an inverted slingblade and a spider suplex for a two-count. Athena delivered a bulldog to Starkz off the guardrail. Athena then landed a middle-rope back suplex for a two-count. Athena inadvertently hit the referee and delivered a forearm smash to Starkz, but the referee was still knocked down. Athena then told Lexy Nair to ring the bell, which she hesitated. Athena told Lexy to give her the title belt, but Lexy was still hesitant. Starkz then performed a running knee strike to the back of Athena's head and then the Starkz 10 for a nearfall. Starkz then performed an electric chair driver on the apron. Starkz attempted another swanton bomb, but Athena moved out of the way and hit a forearm smash, but couldn't make the cover. Athena then hit the Despicable Knee on Starkz for a one-count. Atena attempted the O-Face, bur Starkz countered it into an O'Connor Roll for a two-count. Athena attempted the Starkz 10, bur Starkz blocked. Athena then locked in a hammerlock leg lock, forcing Starkz to tap out. After the match, Athena embraced Stakrz and raised her hand.

== Reception ==
Doc-Chris Mueller of Bleacher Report gave the show an A, stating that "Friday's Final Battle event was another in a long line of great Ring of Honor shows that highlighted some of the best wrestling you will see in any company. Picking the best match on this show would be difficult because it had so many different kinds of performances. It had everything from high-flying luchadors to 300-poundpowerhouses ramming into each other like animals. It had technical clinics, bloody violence and anything else you could ask for at a PPV. When the good outweighs the bad by as much as it did on Friday night, it's hard to have any complaints".

Mike Malkasian of Wrestling Headlines gave the overall show a 9/10, stating "that the pay-per-view was fantastic from top to bottom. It singlehandedly rekindled my interest in ROH. The only issue was that it dragged to long"

Phil Wheat of Nerdly gave the show a 3.5 out of 5, stating that "No matter what you think about this iteration of Ring of Honor, you can't deny that Tony Khan can put together a decent PPV – as he does for every pay-per-view, no matter the brand – and this year's Final Battle was no exception. My only issue is that the show should have had a decent runtime".

Coby Galenzoski of Wrestling Republix gave the show a 4 out of 5, stating that "ROH Final Battle 2023 provided a very entertaining show from top to bottom. The opener was successful in starting the show successfully before the rest of the card followed suit. Ultimately this is a show that if you cut the fluff it's by far a better show. This is not meant to take credit away as this would have been a solid final PPV of the year if Worlds End didn't exist".

Wrestling journalist Dave Meltzer of the Wrestling Observer Newsletter rated the following matches: the Valkyrie-Allure match 1 star, the Von Erichs vs Outrunners bout 1.25 stars, the Keith vs Cartwheel match 3.25 stars, Garcia vs Christian 3.5 stars, the AAA Mega Championship match 4.5 stars, the ROH World Six-Man Tag Team titles match 3.75 stars, the "I Quit" match 4.25 stars, the Rose-VertVixen match 0.75 stars (the lowest rated match on the card), the Survival of the Fittest and the Fight Without Honor 4.75 stars (the highest rated matches on the card), the ROH Pure title match 3.5 stars, the Lee-Taylor bout 2.5 stars, the Proving Ground match 2.5 stars, and the ROH Women's title match 4.25 stars.

== Results ==
No.	Results	Stipulations	Times
1^{P}	Taya Valkyrie (with Johnny TV) defeated Jazmin Allure by pinfall	Singles match	4:08
2^{P}	The Von Erichs (Ross Von Erich and Marshall Von Erich) defeated The Outrunners (Turbo Floyd and Truth Magnum) by submission	Tag team match	6:52
3^{P}	Bryan Keith defeated Jack Cartwheel by pinfall	Survival of the Fittest Qualifier	7:55
4^{P}	Daniel Garcia defeated Blake Christian by submission	Singles match	12:15
5	El Hijo del Vikingo (c) defeated Black Taurus by pinfall	Singles match for the AAA Mega Championship	16:30
6	The Mogul Embassy (Bishop Kaun, Toa Liona and Brian Cage) (c) (with Prince Nana) defeated TMDK (Kosei Fujita, Bad Dude Tito and Shane Haste) by pinfall	Six-man tag team match for the ROH World Six-Man Tag Team Championship	12:05
7	Ethan Page defeated Tony Nese (with "Smart" Mark Sterling)	"I Quit" match	20:05
8	Nyla Rose defeated VertVixen by pinfall	Singles match	2:40
9	Kyle Fletcher defeated Komander, Bryan Keith, Lee Moriarty, Dalton Castle, and Lee Johnson	Survival of the Fittest Finals for the vacant ROH World Television Championship	25:55
10	Wheeler Yuta (c) defeated Tom Lawlor by pinfall	Pure wrestling rules match for the ROH Pure Championship; Christopher Daniels, Jerry Lynn and Jimmy Jacobs served as the judges.	13:10
11	Keith Lee defeated Shane Taylor by pinfall	Singles match	14:40
12	Dem Top Guys (FTR (Cash Wheeler and Dax Harwood) and Mark Briscoe) defeated Blackpool Combat Club (Bryan Danielson, Jon Moxley, and Claudio Castagnoli) by pinfall	Jay Briscoe Memorial Fight Without Honor (Note: The match was originally booked as a six-man tag team match. The match ended in a double countout and was restarted as a Fight Without Honor.)	29:35
13	Eddie Kingston defeated Anthony Henry by submission	Proving Ground match Since Henry did not last 10 minutes, he did not earn an opportunity to challenge for Kingston's ROH World Championship.	5:45
14	Athena (c) defeated Billie Starkz by submission	Singles match for the ROH Women's World Championship	28:30
(c) / – the champion(s) heading into the match; P / – the match was broadcast on the pre-show

=== Vacant ROH World Television Championship Survival of the Fittest match ===
Eliminated	Wrestler	Eliminated by	Method	Time
1	Lee Johnson	Lee Moriarty	Submitted to the Border City Stretch	8:46
2	Dalton Castle	Lee Moriarty	Pinned after The Fang	11:20
3	Lee Moriarty	Bryan Keith	Pinned after the Emerald Tiger Driver	15:38
4	Bryan Keith	Kyle Fletcher	Pinned after the Grimstone	16:52
5	Komander	Kyle Fletcher	Pinned after the Grimstone	25:54
Winner	Kyle Fletcher	—N/a		25:54

== See also ==
- 2023 in professional wrestling
- List of Ring of Honor pay-per-view events
