= Supercard of Honor (2024) =

2024 Ring of Honor professional wrestling event

- Promotional poster
- Promotion: Ring of Honor
- Date: April 5, 2024
- City: Philadelphia, Pennsylvania
- Venue: The Liacouras Center
- Attendance: 3,266

Event chronology
← Previous; Final Battle	Next → Death Before Dishonor

Supercard of Honor chronology
← Previous; 2023	Next → 2025

The 2024 Supercard of Honor was a professional wrestling event produced by American promotion Ring of Honor (ROH). It was the 17th Supercard of Honor and took place on April 5, 2024, at the Liacouras Center in Philadelphia, Pennsylvania and aired exclusively on Honor Club. The event also featured wrestlers from sister promotion All Elite Wrestling (AEW) and AEW's partner promotion World Wonder Ring Stardom (ST★RDOM).

Twelve matches were contested at the event, including four on the Zero Hour pre-show. In the main event, Mark Briscoe defeated Eddie Kingston to win the ROH World Championship. In other prominent matches, Athena defeated Hikaru Shida to retain the ROH Women’s World Championship. Dalton Castle defeated Johnny TV in a Fight Without Honor, Billie Starkz defeated Queen Aminata to become the inaugural ROH Women's World Television Champion, Mei Seira and Empress Nexus Venus (Maika and Mina Shirakawa) defeated Tam Nakano and Queen's Quest (Saya Kamitani and AZM), and in the opening contest, Kyle Fletcher defeated Lee Johnson to retain the ROH World Television Championship.

== Production ==
=== Background ===
Supercard of Honor is a pay-per-view professional wrestling event annually presented by Ring of Honor (ROH), and primarily takes place during the weekend of WrestleMania - the flagship event of WWE, and considered to be the biggest wrestling event of the year. It has been a yearly tradition since 2006. The shows are sometimes two-day events, traditionally taking place on Friday nights and/or Saturday afternoons, and are held either in or nearby the same city as that year's WrestleMania.

In February, 2024, it was announced that Supercard of Honor would take place on April 5 on the campus of Temple University, at Liacouras Center in Philadelphia, Pennsylvania.

=== Storylines ===
The event featured professional wrestling matches that involved different wrestlers from pre-existing scripted feuds and storylines. Wrestlers portrayed villains, heroes, or less distinguishable characters in scripted events that build tension and culminate in a wrestling match or series of matches. Storylines were produced on ROH's weekly series ROH Honor Club TV exclusively on their streaming service Honor Club, on television programs of sister promotion All Elite Wrestling including Dynamite, Rampage and Collision.

On the December 16, 2023, episode of ROH Honor Club TV, Tony Khan introduced the ROH Women's World Television Championship, with a tournament to crown the inaugural champion later announced. The tournament, which had sixteen participants, began on the February 22, 2024 episode, with the finals eventually set for Supercard of Honor. On the March 21 episode, Billie Starkz and Queen Aminata defeated Mercedes Martinez and Red Velvet, respectively, in the semifinals. Both would now face each other at Supercard of Honor to become the inaugural champion.

At Death Before Dishonor the previous July, Mark Briscoe was set to challenge for the ROH World Championship against then-champion Claudio Castagnoli, but had to undergo knee surgery and was unable to compete. Briscoe was urged to challenge Castagnoli by Eddie Kingston, who would eventually beat Castagnoli for the ROH World Championship at Grand Slam. On the March 14, 2024, episode of ROH Honor Club TV, ROH announced that Briscoe will get his title match when he challenges Kingston at Supercard of Honor.

On the March 14 episode of ROH Honor Club TV, after ROH Women's World Champion Athena scored a quick victory in a Proving Ground match, she demanded more competition for her record-setting reign, believing those in ROH had grown scared of her. From there, she would be confronted by former AEW Women's World Champion Hikaru Shida, with it later being confirmed she will challenge Athena at Supercard of Honor.

For months, Dalton Castle and Johnny TV had been in a feud, stemming from Castle beating Johnny on the December 7, 2023 ROH Honor Club TV. Since then, Johnny began interfering in Castle's matches, leading to Castle constantly chasing after Johnny in demand for a rematch. They eventually would have that rematch on February 29, 2024, for custody of Castle's manservants, The Boys (Brandon and Brent). Johnny would win due to interference from his wife, Taya Valkyrie. Castle continued on his downward spiral, especially after Johnny and Valkyrie revealed that The Boys were, in kayfabe, eaten by a bear during a mountain hike. On March 31, 2024, ROH Board of Director member Jerry Lynn announced that Johnny would face Castle at Supercard of Honor in a Fight Without Honor.

On the December 27, 2023 episode of AEW Dynamite, The Devil's Masked Men, later revealed as The Undisputed Kingdom (Matt Taven and Mike Bennett), won the ROH World Tag Team Championship from MJF and acting champion Samoa Joe. On the April 4 episode of ROH Honor Club TV, they would face The Infantry (Carlie Bravo and Capt. Shawn Dean) in a Proving Ground match that ended in a time limit draw. Despite The Infantry not beating the champions, Proving Ground matches also grant challengers title opportunities if they go to a draw. Thus, The Infantry challenged the Undisputed Kingdom for the ROH World Tag Team Championship at Supercard of Honor.

== Event ==
Other on-screen personnel
Role:	Name:
Commentators	Ian Riccaboni (Pre-show and PPV)
Commentators	Caprice Coleman (Pre-show and PPV)
Commentators	Nigel McGuinness (PPV)
Ring announcer	Bobby Cruise

=== Zero-Hour ===
There were four matches contested on the Zero-Hour pre-show. In the opener, The Premier Athletes (Ari Daivari, Josh Woods and Tony Nese) (accompanied by Mark Sterling faced Tony Deppen, Rhett Titus and Adam Priest. In the closing stages, Woods performed a belly-to-belly suplex to Priest. Daivari then delivered a reverse DDT to Priest for a two-count. The Premier Athletes then performed a TKO cutter combo on Priest, allowing Woods to deliver a German suplex and a jawbreaker suplex to Priest. The Premier Athletes then delivered a powerbomb/diving fist drops to Deppen and pinned him to win the match.

Next, The Beast Mortos went one-on-one with Blake Christian. In the opening stages, Christian delivered a wheelbarrow suplex and a diving uppercut for a two-count. Mortos then delivered a discus clothesline to Christian for a two-count. Christian then delivered a handstand tornado DDT and a spear on the apron. Mortos then delivered a bulldog, a crucifix driver and a pop-up Samoan Drop for a two-count. Christian then del a tornado DDT on the ramp and then a 450° splash back in the ring for a two-count. Mortos then performed a top-rope gorilla press slam and a pumphandle piledriver to win the match.

Next, Griff Garrison and Cole Karter (accompanied by Maria) took on Spanish Announce Project (Angélico and Serpentico). In the opening stages, SAP delivered a double-team backbreaker to Garrison. Karter then delivered a spinebuster to Serpentico for a two-count. Angélico then delivered a jumping knee strike and a rewind kick to Karter for a two-count. SAP then delivered a flatliner/swanton bomb to Karter, but Garrison broke up the pin. SAP then performed a fireman's carry/big boot combination to Angélico. Maria attempted to attack Serpentico with a chair, but the referee caught her and ejected her from ringside. Garrison then grabbed Serpentico's mask from his face, allowing Karter to perform a roll-up pin on him to win the match.

In the main event of the Zero-Hour pre-show, Mariah May faced Stardom wrestler Momo Kohgo. In the opening stages, Kohgo delivered a corner springboard crossbody and a basement dropkick. May then delivered a dropkick to Kohgo for a two-count. Kohgo delivered a spinning sidewalk slam and a shotgun dropkick for a two-count. Kohgo then delivered a springboard dropkick and a 619 to May for a two-count. May then performed a handstand hurricarana and a missile dropkick to Kohgo for a two-count. Kohgo then delivered a satellite DDT for a two-count. Kohgo attempted Momompa, but May delivered a headbutt and a saito suplex. May then delivered It's Gonna Be May knee strike to Kohgo and pinned her to win the match.

=== Preliminary matches ===
In the opening contest, Kyle Fletcher defended the ROH World Television Championship against Lee Johnson. In the opening stages, Fletcher performed a tope con gilo to Johnson over the top rope and then delivered a brainbuster to Johnson on the guardrail. Fletcher then delivered a running cannonball to Johnson on the guardrail. Johnson then delivered a diving neckbreaker, a PK and a standing moonsault for a two-count. Johnson attempted a suplex, but Fletcher countered it into a brainbuster for a two-count. Fletcher attempted a clothesline, but Johnson ducked and delivered a Blue Thunder Bomb for a two-count. Fletcher then performed an avalanche Michinoku Driver for a two-count. Fletcher then attempted a piledriver, but Johnson countered it into a hurricarana driver for another two-count. Fletcher then performed turnbuckle brainbuster and then a sit-out powerbomb for a two-count. Fletcher then delivered a half-and-half suplex, but Johnson immediately delivered a poisonrana. Fletcher then delivered a leg lariat and a tombstone piledriver for a two-count. Johnson then delivered an avalanche Canadian Destroyer and two frog splashes for a nearfall. Fletcher then performed a lawn dart, a running corner leg lariat and a turnbuckle brainbuster to win the match.

In the next match, Mei Seira and Empress Nexus Venus (Maika and Mina Shirakawa) faced Tam Nakano and Queen's Quest (Saya Kamitani and AZM) in a Stardom Showcase six-woman tag team match. In the opening stages, Nakano delivered a running back elbow, a PK and a rolling elbow. Nakano attempted a Michinoku Driver, but Seira escaped and delivered a superkick. AZM attempted a diving double stomp, but Seira moved out of the way and delivered a Codebreaker. Kamitani then delivered a spinning wheel kick to Shirakawa and a Northern Lights suplex for a two-count. Maika and Shirakawa then performed a double facebuster to Seira. Shirakawa then performed an electric chair/facebuster combination and then locked in the Figure Four leglock on Seira, but AZM broke up the submission attempt with a double stomp. Kamitani then delivered a springboard facebuster and a teardrop suplex to Shirakawa for a two-count. Shirakawa then delivered a backfist to Kamitani for a two-count. Maika then delivered a double lariat to AZM and Nakano, allowing Shirakawa to deliver an enzeguiri for a two-count and a 1914 to Kamitani for the three-count and the win. After the match, former Empress Nexus Venus member Mariah May came out to celebrate with Shirakawa, Maika and Seira.

In the next match, The Undisputed Kingdom (Matt Taven and Mike Bennett) defended the ROH World Tag Team Championship against The Infantry (Carlie Bravo and Capt. Shawn Dean) (accompanied by Trish Adora). In the opening stages, Dean performed a tope con gilo to Taven and Bennett over the top rope. Bennett then delivered a suplex to Dean on the guardrail. Taven then delivered a spike piledriver to Dean on the entrance ramp. Dean then delivered a discus lariat to Taven and a double underhook backbreaker to Bennett for a two-count. Bravo then delivered a fireman's carry stunner and Dean delivered a German suplex to Bennett. Bennett and Taven then performed a Spiccoli Driver/Just The Tip to Dean for a two-count. Bennett and Taven then delivered the Proton Pack to Dean, but Bravo broke up the pin attempt. The Infantry then delivered the Boot Camp to Bennett, but Taven broke up the pin. Bravo then delivered a running splash off the ramp through a table to Taven. Fellow Undisputed Kingdom member Wardlow then came out through the guardrail and delivered a lariat to Dean behind the referee's back. Bennett then pinned Dean to win the match.

The next match was the finals of the ROH Women's World Television Championship tournament to crown the inaugural ROH Women's World Television Champion contested between Billie Starkz and Queen Aminata. In the opening stages, Starkz performed a sunset flip powerbomb to Aminata for a one-count. Aminata then delivered a running boot to Starkz, who was on the bottom ropes. Aminata then delivered a German suplex and a Powerdrive Knee to Starkz for a two-count. Starkz then attempted a clothesline, but Aminata ducked and delivered a jumping flatliner. Aminata attempted an Air Raid Crash, but Starkz escaped and delivered a back elbow, a backbreaker and a uranage for a two-count. Aminata then countered a Gory Bomb attempt by Starkz into a backslide for a two-count. Starkz then performed a twisting Ushigaroshi for a two-count. Starkz attempted a somersault senton to Aminata on the apron, but Aminata moved out of the way. Aminata then delivered a diving double foot stomp to Starkz off the apron. Aminata then delivered a swanton bomb to Starkz for a one-count; Aminata then delivered an Air Raid Crash to Starkz for a two-count. Starkz then attempted a swanton bomb to Aminata, but Aminata got her knees up. Starkz then feigned injuring her neck, as the doctor came in and put a neck brace on her neck. Aminata attempted to assist Starkz in leaving the ring, but Starkz grabbed her from behind and delivered a German suplex and then locked in a rear naked choke, forcing Aminata to pass out, thus declaring Starkz the winner by technical submission and the inaugural ROH Women's World Television Champion.

In the next match, Bullet Club Gold (Jay White and The Gunns (Colten Gunn and Austin Gunn)) and issued a Bang Bang open challenge for the ROH World Six-Man Tag Team Championship; Monstersauce (Lance Archer and Alex Zayne) and Minoru Suzuki answered the challenge. In the closing stages, Suzuki delivered a Helluva Kick and a PK to White for a two-count. White then delivered a uranage to Zayne and attempted the Bladerunner, but Suzuki choked him from behind. The Gunns then threw Suzuki into the guardrail. Back in the ring, Archer delivered a chokeslam to White, but The Gunns delivered a 3:10 to Yuma to Archer, allowing White to deliver the Bladerunner to Zayne for the win.

Next, Johnny TV (accompanied by Taya Valkyrie faced Dalton Castle in a Fight Without Honor. In the opening stages, Castle delivered a DDT and a hurricarana to Johnny. Johnny then delivered a swinging neckbreaker to Castle and proceeded to beat down Castle with a kendo stick. Johnny then performed a kendo-assisted side Russian legsweep. Castle attempted a hurricarana, but Johnny caught him and powerbombed him through a table. Johnny then placed a pile of chairs onto Castle and attempted Starship Pain, but Castle stood up and hit Johnny with a kendo stick. Paul Walter Hauser then came down to the ring disguised as one of Castle's boys; Johnny approached him and Hauser delivered a Sky High spinebuster to Johnny. The Boys then carried Taya away, allowing Castle to deliver the Bang-a-Rang on Johnny onto a pile of thumbtacks and then pin him to win the match.

In the penultimate match, Athena defended the ROH Women's World Championship against Hikaru Shida. In the opening stages, Shida delivered a running elbow strike and a Falcon Arrow to Athena for a two-count; Shida then performed a tirt-a-whirl backbreaker. Shida then delivered a running dropkick and a running knee strike to Athena for a two-count. Athena then delivered a saito suplex and a wheelbarrow suplex for a two-count. Athena then delivered Project Ciampa to Shida for a one-count. Athena then delivered the O-Face to Shida for a two-count. Shida then hit Athena with the Katana for a two-count. Shida then delivered a straitjacket German suplex and a lariat to Athena, but Athena then superkicked Shida and delivered another O-Face to Shida and pinned her to retain the title.

=== Main event ===
In the main event, Eddie Kingston defended the ROH World Championship against Mark Briscoe. In the opening stages, Mark delivered a dropkick and a cannonball suicide dive to Kingston. Kingston then chokeslammed Mark onto a chair and delivered a lariat. Kingston then performed a double underhook suplex as Mark's face continued bleeding. Mark then delivered an uppercut and a shotgun dropkick to Kingston through the guardrail. Mark then suplexed Eddie onto the floor and then performed a Cactus Elbow off the apron. Kingston then delivered an elbow drop to Mark for a two-count. Kingston then delivered a spinning backfist, but Mark responded with a redneck kung-fu uppercut and a flying elbow drop. Mark then delivered a fisherman buster to Kingston for a two-count. Mark then delivered a blockbuster and attempted the Froggy Bow, bur Kingston moved out of the way. Mark then delivered a Spiccoli Driver and then the Froggy Bow for a nearfall. Kingston then performed a T-Bone suplex off the apron to Mark. Mark attempted a Jay Driller, but Eddie escaped and delivered a half-and-half suplex and a spinning backfist for a two-count. Mark attempted another Jay Driller, but Kingston back body dropped him. Kingston delivered another spinning backfist, but Mark responded with an enzuigiri. Eddie attempted a Northern Lights Bomb, but Mark escaped and performed a Cut Throat Driver for a nearfall. Mark then delivered the Jay Driller and pinned Kingston to win the match and secure his first ROH World Championship, 11 years to the day that his late brother Jay Briscoe won the championship from Kevin Steen. After the match, the ROH locker room celebrated with Mark, as Mark and Kingston embraced.

== Reception ==
Mike Malkasian of Wrestling Headlines gave the overall show a 9.25/10, saying "A very entertaining, consistent, buffet of pro wrestling tonight. Fletcher and Johnson set the tone with an unbelievable opening match and ROH never took their foot off the gas. The Stardom six-person tag was a breath of fresh air, Aminata and Starkz showcased the future of the ROH women’s division while Athena and Shida showed us why that division is so strong right now. Fun surprises from the Bang Bang Gang and Suzuki, as well as a Wardlow appearance. Lastly, the main event was a classic, old school, brutal, Danielson/Morishima-esque fight that had all of the emotion considering the circumstances".

Doc-Chris Mueller of Bleacher Report graded the show a B+, saying "This year's Supercard of Honor felt like a bit of a reset after an uncertain time for the brand. For several months, ROH has been struggling to maintain interest outside of a few key storylines, but this show saw a couple of new champions crowned who could help change that. Starkz becoming the first women's TV champion was a great moment for the 19-year-old, but the biggest highlight was seeing Briscoe achieve his dream of winning the same world title is brother Jay once held. As far as in-ring quality goes, Athena and Shida stole the show, but several above-average matches helped make this a fun PPV. Overall, this was a solid ROH PPV".

Wrestling journalist Dave Meltzer of the Wrestling Observer Newsletter rated the following matches: the six-man tag team match and the Karter and Garrison vs. SAP match 2 stars, The Beast Mortos–Blake Christian match and the ROH World Six-Man Tag Team Championship match 3.25 stars, the May–Kohgo bout 2.5 stars, the TV title match 4.25 stars, the Stardom Showcase match 4 stars, the ROH World Tag Team Championship match 3 stars, the ROH Women's World TV title match and the ROH Women's World Championship match 3.5 stars, the Fight Without Honor 1.5 stars (the lowest rated match on the card) and the main event 4.5 stars (the highest rated match on the card).

== Results ==
No.	Results	Stipulations	Times
1^{P}	The Premier Athletes (Tony Nese, Josh Woods and Ari Daivari) (with "Smart" Mark Sterling) defeated Rhett Titus, Tony Deppen, and Adam Priest by pinfall	Six-man tag team match	8:06
2^{P}	The Beast Mortos defeated Blake Christian by pinfall	Singles match	8:38
3^{P}	Griff Garrison and Cole Karter (with Maria Kanellis) defeated Spanish Announce Project (Angélico and Serpentico) by pinfall	Tag team match	8:28
4^{P}	Mariah May defeated Momo Kohgo by pinfall	Singles match	6:14
5	Kyle Fletcher (c) defeated Lee Johnson by pinfall	Singles match for the ROH World Television Championship	19:48
6	Mei Seira and Empress Nexus Venus (Maika and Mina Shirakawa) defeated Tam Nakano and Queen's Quest (Saya Kamitani and AZM) by pinfall	Stardom Showcase six-woman tag team match	14:32
7	The Undisputed Kingdom (Matt Taven and Mike Bennett) (c) defeated The Infantry (Carlie Bravo and Capt. Shawn Dean) (with Trish Adora) by pinfall	Tag team match for the ROH World Tag Team Championship	13:51
8	Billie Starkz defeated Queen Aminata by submission	Tournament final for the inaugural ROH Women's World Television Championship	17:42
9	Bullet Club Gold (The Gunns (Austin Gunn and Colten Gunn) and Jay White) (c) defeated Monstersauce (Lance Archer and Alex Zayne) and Minoru Suzuki by pinfall	Six-man tag team match for the ROH World Six-Man Tag Team Championship	15:32
10	Dalton Castle defeated Johnny TV (with Taya Valkyrie) by pinfall	Fight Without Honor	21:55
11	Athena (c) defeated Hikaru Shida by pinfall	Singles match for the ROH Women's World Championship	22:38
12	Mark Briscoe defeated Eddie Kingston (c) by pinfall	Singles match for the ROH World Championship	24:14
(c) / – the champion(s) heading into the match; P / – the match was broadcast on the pre-show

=== Inaugural ROH Women's World Television Championship tournament bracket (2024) ===
First Round; ROH Wrestling (February 15 and 22)
Kiera Hogan	6:31
Diamanté	Pin
Billie Starkz	Sub
Robyn Renegade	9:47
Mercedes Martinez	Sub
Trish Adora	9:46
Viva Van	5:48
Abadon	Pin
Rachael Ellering	10:49
Leyla Hirsch	Pin
Sandra Moone	9:01
Red Velvet	Pin
J–Rod	6:04
Queen Aminata	Pin
Sussy Love	7:19
Taya Valkyrie	Pin

Quarterfinals; ROH Wrestling (February 29, March 7 and 14)
Diamanté	11:38
Billie Starkz	Pin
Mercedes Martinez	Pin
Abadon	9:46
Leyla Hirsch	9:46
Red Velvet	Pin
Queen Aminata	Pin
Taya Valkyrie	8:52

Semifinals; ROH Wrestling (March 21)
Billie Starkz	Pin
Mercedes Martinez	11:33
Red Velvet	9:24
Queen Aminata	Pin

Final; Supercard of Honor (April 5)
Billie Starkz	Sub
Queen Aminata	17:42

1 Originally scheduled participant Lady Frost was on tour in Mexico when the tournament began, so she was removed.
