= Death Before Dishonor (2024) =

2024 Ring of Honor pay-per-view event

- Promotional poster featuring various wrestlers
- Promotion: Ring of Honor
- Date: July 26, 2024
- City: Arlington, Texas
- Venue: Esports Stadium Arlington
- Attendance: 1,157

Event chronology
← Previous; Supercard of Honor	Next → Final Battle

Death Before Dishonor chronology
← Previous; 2023	Next → 2025

The 2024 Death Before Dishonor was a professional wrestling live streaming event produced by the American promotion Ring of Honor (ROH). It is the 21st Death Before Dishonor event and took place on July 26, 2024, at the Esports Stadium Arlington in Arlington, Texas, and aired exclusively on Honor Club.

Thirteen matches were contested at the event, including four on the Zero Hour pre-show. In the main event, Mark Briscoe defeated Roderick Strong to retain the ROH World Championship. In other prominent matches, Athena defeated Queen Aminata to retain the ROH Women’s World Championship, Red Velvet defeated Billie Starkz to win the ROH Women's World Television Champion, Leyla Hirsch defeated Diamanté in a Texas Deathmatch, The Undisputed Kingdom (Matt Taven and Mike Bennett) defeated The Conglomeration (Kyle O'Reilly and Tomohiro Ishii) to retain the ROH World Tag Team Championship, and Atlantis Jr. retained the ROH World Television Championship in a Survival of the Fittest match against Brian Cage, Johnny TV, Lee Johnson, Lio Rush, and Shane Taylor.

== Production ==
=== Background ===
Death Before Dishonor is a professional wrestling event, held annually by American promotion Ring of Honor. The first event was held in 2003, and is traditionally one of ROH's biggest signature events in the calendar year. On the May 16, 2024, it was announced that Death Before Dishonor would take place on July 26, 2024, at the Esports Stadium Arlington in Arlington, Texas, and would air on pay-per-view.

=== Storylines ===
The event will feature professional wrestling matches that involve different wrestlers from pre-existing scripted feuds and storylines. Wrestlers portray villains, heroes, or less distinguishable characters in scripted events that build tension and culminate in a wrestling match or series of matches. Storylines were produced on ROH's weekly series ROH Honor Club TV on their Honor Club service, as well as the programming of sister promotion All Elite Wrestling (AEW); including weekly television series Dynamite, Rampage and Collision, and via promotional videos on both the ROH and AEW YouTube channels and social media platforms.

Queen Aminata and Red Velvet had been feuding with ROH Women's World Champion Athena and ROH Women's World Television Champion Billie Starkz for the past several months, starting when Starkz defeated Aminata at Supercard of Honor in March to become the inaugural women's TV champion. In the end of their tournament final match, Starkz faked a neck injury that allowed her to win the title. The following week, Athena and Red Velvet had a match for the ROH Women's World Championship at AEW Battle of the Belts X, where Athena was victorious thanks to interference by Starkz. After the match, Athena and Starkz jumped Velvet before Aminata came down for the save. For the next few months, Aminata and Velvet continued to prevent Athena and Starkz from doing more damage to their opponents after their matches, as the latter pair did all they can to avoid defending their titles against the two. Athena even claimed to have an ankle injury that would take her out of action for several months. However, on the July 4 episode of ROH Honor Club TV, Aminata and Velvet confronted Athena and Starkz to announce that they will respectively challenge them for the world and television titles at Death Before Dishonor.

On the July 13 episode of AEW Collision, Roderick Strong defeated Dalton Castle to become the number one contender for the ROH World Championship, earning a match against champion Mark Briscoe at Death Before Dishonor.

Diamanté and Leyla Hirsch had been involved in a heated rivalry over the past month, starting when the latter beat the former in a singles match on the June 20 episode of ROH Honor Club TV. After some back and forth promos between the two, they had a rematch on July 18, this time in a Lights Out match, where Diamanté would defeat Hirsch. With both now at one win over apiece, ROH announced a rubber match between Diamanté and Hirsch at Death Before Dishonor in a Texas Deathmatch.

On the July 11 episode of ROH Honor Club TV, ROH Pure Champion Wheeler Yuta had a Proving Ground match against Lee Moriarty that ended in a time limit draw. Per the stipulation of a Proving Ground match, this granted Moriarty a title match. On July 23, ROH president Tony Khan announced on X that Yuta would defend his ROH Pure Championship against Moriarty at Death Before Dishonor.

On July 25, Tony Khan announced a six-man Survival of the Fittest match at Death Before Dishonor for the ROH World Television Championship involving champion Atlantis Jr., Lio Rush, Johnny TV, Shane Taylor, Lee Johnson and Brian Cage. Days prior on ROH Honor Club TV, Atlantis Jr. and Rush lost a tag team match to Johnny TV and Taylor. Therefore, there was already history between them going into the event. Johnson and Cage also had a history with each other years before the match.

At AEW Revolution, while Undisputed Kingdom member Roderick Strong celebrated with his stablemates, ROH World Tag Team Champions Matt Taven and Mike Bennett, after capturing the AEW International Championship from Orange Cassidy; Kyle O'Reilly, making his return to the company after a year away due to a neck injury, appeared behind them. While O'Reilly initially seemed friendly with his old friends, he refuted their offer to join the Undisputed Kingdom. Since then, Strong, Taven, and Bennett have repeatedly tried to coerce O'Reilly into joining them, even if it meant hurting him. This led to a match at AEW Dynasty the following month, Strong successfully defended the AEW International Championship against O'Reilly. As the Undisputed Kingdom's attempts at recruiting O'Reilly continued, the latter formed a new stable with ROH World Champion Mark Briscoe, Orange Cassidy, and Tomohiro Ishii called "The Conglomeration." As the two stables feuded for the next several weeks, Taven and Bennett called out Tony Khan on the July 11 ROH Honor Club TV to give them the night off at Death Before Dishonor. However, two weeks later, newly appointed ROH Board of Directors member Paul Wight informed the pair that they would instead defend the ROH World Tag Team Championship against O'Reilly and Ishii at the event.

On the July 13 episode of AEW Collision, AEW Interim Executive Vice President Christopher Daniels stripped The Bang Bang Gang (Jay White and The Gunns (Austin Gunn and Colten Gunn)) of the Unified Trios Championship (consisting of the AEW World Trios Championship and the ROH World Six-Man Tag Team Championship) after White suffered an injury and refused their invocation of the Freebird Rule by having Juice Robinson defend the titles in White's place. The AEW World Trios Championship would be decided on the following Collision where The Patriarchy (Christian Cage, Killswitch, and Nick Wayne) defeated The Bang Bang Gang (Robinson and The Gunns). On the July 25 episode of ROH Honor Club TV, The Von Erichs (Marshall Von Erich and Ross Von Erich) defeated The Dark Order (John Silver and Alex Reynolds) in a tag team match. This later escalated into a post-match brawl between the teams alongside Dustin Rhodes and Evil Uno, respectively, with the former group standing tall. Later, ROH announced that the two trios would face at Death Before Dishonor in an ROH World Six-Man Tag Team Championship Eliminator match, with the winners going on to face The Undisputed Kingdom for the vacant titles at AEW Battle of the Belts XI.

On the July 4 episode of ROH Honor Club TV, former WWE tag team MxM Collection (Mansoor and Mason Madden) appeared via vignette teasing their arrival in ROH. After a few more video packages, ROH announced the debut of MxM Collection for the Death Before Dishonor Zero Hour pre-show.

== Results ==
No.	Results	Stipulations	Times
1^{P}	MxM Collection (Mason Madden and Mansoor) defeated Spanish Announce Project (Angélico and Serpentico) by pinfall	Tag team match	9:07
2^{P}	Marina Shafir defeated Angelica Risk by submission	Singles match	1:00
3^{P}	The Infantry (Carlie Bravo and Capt. Shawn Dean) (with Trish Adora) defeated Griff Garrison and Anthony Henry (with Maria Kanellis) by pinfall	Tag team match	9:17
4^{P}	Top Flight (Dante Martin and Darius Martin) defeated The Outrunners (Truth Magnum and Turbo Floyd) (with Erica Leigh) by pinfall	Tag team match	8:43
5	The Beast Mortos defeated Komander (with Alex Abrahantes) by pinfall	Singles match	13:31
6	Undisputed Kingdom (Matt Taven and Mike Bennett) (c) defeated The Conglomeration (Kyle O'Reilly and Tomohiro Ishii) by pinfall	Tag team match for the ROH World Tag Team Championship	19:41
7	Leyla Hirsch defeated Diamanté	Texas Deathmatch	15:42
8	Lee Moriarty defeated Wheeler Yuta (c) by pinfall	Pure Wrestling Rules match for the ROH Pure Championship	19:52
9	Red Velvet defeated Billie Starkz (c) by pinfall	Singles match for the ROH Women's World Television Championship	14:55
10	The Von Erichs (Marshall Von Erich and Ross Von Erich) and Dustin Rhodes (with Kevin Von Erich) defeated The Dark Order (Evil Uno, John Silver, and Alex Reynolds) by pinfall	ROH World Six-Man Tag Team Championship eliminator match The winner would face The Undisputed Kingdom (Roderick Strong, Matt Taven, and Mike Bennett) for the vacant titles at AEW Battle of the Belts XI.	14:29
11	Atlantis Jr. (c) defeated Lio Rush, Shane Taylor, Brian Cage, Lee Johnson, and Johnny TV (with Taya Valkyrie) by pinfall	Survival of the Fittest match for the ROH World Television Championship	19:12
12	Athena (c) defeated Queen Aminata by pinfall	Singles match for the ROH Women's World Championship	20:15
13	Mark Briscoe (c) defeated Roderick Strong (with Matt Taven and Mike Bennett) by pinfall	Singles match for the ROH World Championship	19:35
(c) / – the champion(s) heading into the match; P / – the match was broadcast on the pre-show

=== ROH World Television Championship Survival of the Fittest match ===
Eliminated	Wrestler	Eliminated by	Method of elimination	Time
1	Shane Taylor	Lio Rush	Pinned after The Final Hour	9:56
2	Lio Rush	Lee Johnson	Pinned after the Big Shot Drop	11:32
3	Lee Johnson	Brian Cage and Johnny TV	Double pinned after a powerslam / springboard kick combo	15:05
4	Johnny TV	Brian Cage	Pinned after the Drill Claw	18:39
5	Brian Cage	Atlantis Jr.	Pinned with a victory roll	19:12
Winner	Atlantis Jr. (c)	—N/a		19:12

== See also ==
- 2024 in professional wrestling
- List of Ring of Honor pay-per-view events
