= Death Before Dishonor (2023) =

Ring of Honor pay-per-view event

- Promotional poster featuring all the reigning ROH champions
- Promotion: Ring of Honor
- Date: July 21, 2023
- City: Trenton, New Jersey
- Venue: CURE Insurance Arena
- Attendance: 2,898

Event chronology
← Previous; Supercard of Honor	Next → Final Battle

Death Before Dishonor chronology
← Previous; 2022	Next → 2024

The 2023 Death Before Dishonor was a professional wrestling pay-per-view event produced by American promotion Ring of Honor (ROH). It was the 20th Death Before Dishonor and took place on July 21, 2023, at the CURE Insurance Arena in Trenton, New Jersey.

Twelve matches were contested at the event, including four on the Zero Hour pre-show. In the final match of the night, which was promoted as part of a double main event, Athena defeated Willow Nightingale to retain the ROH Women's World Championship. In the other main event, which was the penultimate match, Claudio Castagnoli defeated Pac to retain the ROH World Championship. In other prominent matches, The Dark Order (Evil Uno, Alex Reynolds and John Silver) won a Fight Without Honor against Stu Grayson and The Righteous (Vincent and Dutch), Katsuyori Shibata defeated Daniel Garcia in a Pure Wrestling Rules match to retain the ROH Pure Championship, Aussie Open (Kyle Fletcher and Mark Davis) defeated The Lucha Brothers (Rey Fénix and Penta El Zero Miedo), The Kingdom (Matt Taven and Mike Bennett) and Best Friends (Chuck Taylor and Trent Beretta) in a four-way tag team match to win the ROH World Tag Team Championship, and in the opening contest, Gravity defeated Komander.

== Production ==
=== Background ===
Death Before Dishonor is a professional wrestling event, held annually by American promotion Ring of Honor. The first event was held in 2003, and is traditionally one of ROH's biggest signature events in the calendar year. On the June 2, 2023, episode of AEW Rampage, it was announced that Death Before Dishonor would take place on July 21, 2023, at the CURE Insurance Arena in Trenton, New Jersey, and would air on pay-per-view.

=== Storylines ===
The event featured professional wrestling matches that involve different wrestlers from pre-existing scripted feuds and storylines. Wrestlers portray villains, heroes, or less distinguishable characters in scripted events that build tension and culminate in a wrestling match or series of matches. Storylines were produced on ROH's weekly series ROH Honor Club TV on their Honor Club service, as well as the programming of sister promotion All Elite Wrestling (AEW); including weekly television series Dynamite, Rampage and Collision, and via promotional videos on both the ROH and AEW YouTube channels and social media platforms.

On July 5, during the second night of NJPW Independence Day, Eddie Kingston defeated Kenta to win the Strong Openweight Championship. Right after winning the title, Kingston challenged Mark Briscoe to step up and go after the ROH World Champion Claudio Castagnoli – someone Kingston personally despises – at Death Before Dishonor, believing that the fans need Mark to become the world champion just as his late brother Jay Briscoe had been. On the July 7 episode of ROH Honor Club TV, the match between Briscoe and Castagnoli for the title at Death Before Dishonor was confirmed. However, on July 13, ROH President Tony Khan announced on Twitter that Briscoe suffered a serious knee injury that will likely require surgery, thus removing him from the event. Castagnoli's new challenger would be announced after the Blood and Guts edition of Dynamite. During the Blood and Guts match, Castagnoli and Pac would frequently butt heads with one another, to the point where Pac walked out on his team. A frustrated Castagnoli, looking for Pac backstage, challenged him to a ROH World Championship match at Death Before Dishonor, which Pac accepted and was made official by Tony Khan.

On the July 13 episode of ROH Honor Club TV, ROH held an ROH World Television Championship Eliminator Tournament, with the winner receiving an opportunity at champion Samoa Joe at Death Before Dishonor. On that episode, Dalton Castle and Shane Taylor advanced to the finals after defeating Tony Nese and Shawn Dean, respectively. The following week, Castle defeated Taylor to earn the title shot against Joe at Death Before Dishonor.

On the June 1 episode of Rampage, after Katsuyori Shibata successfully defended the ROH Pure Championship, he was later confronted by former champion Daniel Garcia, who expressed his intentions of regaining the title. On July 16, ROH officially announced that Shibata would defend the Pure Championship against Garcia at Death Before Dishonor.

On the March 9 episode of ROH Honor Club TV, Athena retained the ROH Women's World Championship against Willow Nightingale. Four months later on the July 14 episode of Rampage, the two met again in the semifinals of the Women's Owen Hart Cup Tournament. Here, Nightingale would defeat Athena, ending the latter's 49 singles match winning streak. On July 16, ROH announced a third match between Athena and Nightingale for the ROH Women's World Championship at Death Before Dishonor.

Since the April 13 episode of ROH Honor Club TV, The Dark Order (Evil Uno, Stu Grayson, Alex Reynolds, and John Silver) would be in a rivalry with The Righteous (Vincent and Dutch) when the latter duo returned to ROH and took an interest in Grayson. For months, Dark Order rebuked The Righteous from recruiting Grayson, but Grayson, tired of letting his stablemates speak for him, ultimately began teaming with The Righteous to the point he fully left Dark Order for them. On July 20, ROH announced that The Dark Order would battle The Righteous in a Fight Without Honor in Death Before Dishonor.

== Event ==
Other on-screen personnel
Role:	Name:
Commentators	Ian Riccaboni
Commentators	Caprice Coleman
Commentators	Stokely Hathaway (TV Title match)
Ring announcer	Bobby Cruise
Backstage interviewer	Lexy Nair

=== Zero Hour ===
There were four matches that took place on the Zero Hour pre-show. In the opener, Josh Woods (with Ari Daivari, Tony Nese, and Mark Sterling) faced Tracy Williams in a Pure Wrestling Rules match. In the closing stages, Woods delivered a gutwrench suplex and locked in the Gorilla Lock, but Williams reached the ropes. Woods then delivered a German suplex on the apron and locked in a guillotine choke on the ropes, forcing Williams to submit.

Next, Action Andretti and Darius Martin faced The WorkHorsemen (Anthony Henry and JD Drake). In the closing stages, Darius delivered a dropkick to Henry. Drake then delivered a moonsault to Darius. Darius then delivered a German suplex to Henry, allowing Andretti to deliver an assisted whirlybird neckbreaker on Drake for the win.

In the penultimate match of the Zero Hour pre-show, Leyla Hirsch faced Trish Adora. In the end, Adora delivered a backbreaker for a two-count. As Adora was attempting the Lariat, Hirsch avoided it and locked in the cross armbreaker, forcing Adora to tap out. After the match, Hirsch locked in another Cross armbreaker, but Skye Blue came down to the ring and stopped Hirsch.

In the Zero Hour main event, AR Fox faced Shane Taylor. In the closing stages, Taylor delivered a spinning piledriver, but Fox reached the ropes. Fox then delivered a Stunner and an enzeguiri, but Taylor immediately delivered a uranage and a splash for a two-count. Fox then delivered a Death Valley Driver and the 450° splash for the win.

=== Preliminary matches ===
In the opening contest, Gravity faced Komander (with Alex Abrahantes). In the opening stages, Komander delivered a Shooting Star Press for a two-count. Gravity then delivered a powerbomb for a two-count. Komander then delivered a tight-walk moonsault and a tope-rope hurricarana for a nearfall. As Komander was attempting the 450° splash, Gravity escaped and performed a roll-up for the win.

Next, Samoa Joe defended the ROH World Television Championship against Dalton Castle (with The Boys (Brent Tate and Brandon Tate)). In the opening stages, Dalton delivered a DDT and a big boot. Joe then delivered an enzeguiri, a snap suplex and a senton for a nearfall. Dalton then delivered a tope suicida and a German suplex. Stokely Hathaway then came down from the commentary table do distract the referee, allowing Joe to perform a low blow and the Coquina Clutch to retain the title.

In the next bout, The Lucha Brothers (Rey Fénix and Penta El Zero Miedo) (with Alex Abrahantes) defended the ROH World Tag Team Championship against Best Friends (Chuck Taylor and Trent Beretta), The Kingdom (Matt Taven and Mike Bennett) (with Maria Kanellis-Bennett), and Aussie Open (Kyle Fletcher and Mark Davis). In the opening stages, Beretta delivered a superplex to Bennett onto the outside of the ring. Taven then delivered a frog splash on Beretta for a nearfall. Penta then delivered the Made in Japan on Taven for a two-count. The Kingdom then delivered the Rockstar Supernova on Fletcher for a two-count. The Lucha Brothers deliver the Fear Factor on Davis for another two-count. Best Friends then delivered the assisted Strong Zero on Bennett, but The Lucha Brothers pulled the referee out of the ring to stop the pinfall attempt. Aussie Open delivered the Coreolis on Beretta to win the titles.

Next, Mogul Embassy (Toa Liona, Bishop Kaun, and Brian Cage) (with Prince Nana) defended the ROH World Six-Man Tag Team Championship against Leon Ruffin and Six or Nine (Ryusuke Taguchi and Master Wato). In the closing stages, Wato delivered a bulldog and a leg lariat on Cage for a two-count. As Prince Nana was distracting the referee, Kaun delivered a low blow to Taguchi, but Taguchi also delivered a low blow to Kaun. Ruffin then delivered a springboard cutter on Cage for a nearfall. The Embassy then delivered a firman's carry facebuster on Ruffin for the win.

Next, Katsuyori Shibata defended the ROH Pure Championship against Daniel Garcia. In the closing stages, Garcia locked in the Dragon Tamer into the STF, but Shibata reached the ropes. Shibata delivered a bicycle kick, but Garcia delivered a T-bone suplex. Shibata then delivered the sleeper into the PK for the win.

The next match was a Fight Without Honor contested between The Dark Order (Evil Uno, Alex Reynolds, and John Silver) and Stu Grayson and The Righteous (Vincent and Dutch). In the opening stages, Silver delivered a dropkick to Dutch into a 2*4 barbed wire, thus allowing Dutch to bleed open. Grayson then delivered a Spear to Uno through a table. Dutch then dropped Reynolds into the barbed wire. Dutch then delivered a Bossman slam to Silver onto a pile of thumbtacks. Dutch then delivered a powerbomb to Uno onto a pile of Lego. Uno then delivered a powerbomb to Grayson through a table for a two-count. Reynolds delivered a DDT to Grayson on the entrance ramp. As Grayson was attempting a senton from the top of a ladder, Uno pushed the ladder, allowing Grayson to fall onto a stack of tables. The Dark Order then delivered a triple powerbomb to Grayson onto a pile of thumbtacks for the win.

In the penultimate match and the first of the double main event, Claudio Castagnoli defended the ROH World Championship against Pac. In the opening stages, Pac delivered a moonsault and a Brainbuster for a two-count. Claudio then delivered an elbow drop for a two-count. As Claudio was attempting the Neutralizer, Pac countered it into an enzeguiri. Claudio then delivered a flapjack and the Neutralizer for a two-count. Pax then delivered a German suplex for a nearfall. As Pac was attempting the Black Arrow, Claudio blocked it with an uppercut. As Claudio was attempting the Ricola Bomb, Pac countered it into a hurricarana. Pac then locked in the Brutalizer, but Claudio lifted him up into an avalanche Air Raid Crash. As Pac was attempting to take off the turnbuckle pad, Wheeler Yuta came down to the ring and stopped him, allowing Claudio to deliver an uppercut and the Ricola Bomb for the win. After the match, The Lucha Brothers came down to assist Pac in attacking Castagnoli and Yuta, but Best Friends then came down to the ring to attack The Lucha Brothers. Orange Cassidy then delivered an Orange Punch to Claudio.

=== Main event ===
In the main event, Athena defended the ROH Women's World Championship against Willow Nightingale. In the opening stages, Athena delivered a backdrop suplex to Willow on the apron. Willow then delivered an enzeguiri and a Perfect Plex for a two-count. As Athena was talking to the referee, Willow delivered a Pounce and a spinebuster for a two-count. Athena then delivered a lungblower for a nearfall. Willow then delivered a powerbomb onto the apron, but Athena immediately delivered a dropkick into the stairs to Willow. As Athena was attempting to deliver double knees to Willow onto the steps, Willow escaped it and delivered a cannonball into the steps to Athena. Athena then delivered an enzeguiri and a standing moonsault, but Willow then delivered Smash Mouth and the Royal Butterfly for a nearfall. As Willow was attempting the Doctor Bomb, Athena escaped it and delivered a snapmare driver for a nearfall. Willow then delivered a spinning DDT for another two-count. Athena then delivered Obliteration and a powerbomb for another nearfall. Willow then delivered an avalanche Spicolli Driver for a two-count. Athena then delivered the O-Face for a two-count. Willow then delivered the Doctor Bomb for a nearfall. Athena then delivered another O-Face and locked in a crossface submission forcing Willow to pass out and thus, Athena retaining her title. After the match, Athena raised Willow's hand as a sign of respect.

== Reception ==
The event received critical acclaim, particularly for the ROH Women's World Championship match between Athena and Willow Nightingale, with many hailing it as one of the best women's wrestling matches of the year. Critics also praised the ROH World Championship match and the ROH World Tag Team Championship match. Wrestling journalist Dave Meltzer of the Wrestling Observer Newsletter rated the Gravity-Komander bout 3.75 stars, the ROH TV match 2.5 stars (the lowest rated match on the card), the ROH Tag title match, the ROH World Championship match and the ROH Women's Championship bout 4.25 stars (the highest rated matches on the card), the ROH Six-Man Tag Team Championship bout 3.25 stars, the ROH Pure Championship match 4 stars and the Fight Without Honor 3.5 stars.

== Results ==
No.	Results	Stipulations	Times
1^{P}	Josh Woods (with The Varsity Athletes (Tony Nese, Ari Daivari, and Mark Sterling)) defeated Tracy Williams by submission	Pure wrestling rules match Christopher Daniels, Jimmy Jacobs, and Jerry Lynn served as the judges.	8:35
2^{P}	Action Andretti and Darius Martin defeated The WorkHorsemen (Anthony Henry and JD Drake) by pinfall	Tag team match	7:20
3^{P}	Leyla Hirsch defeated Trish Adora by submission	Singles match	8:25
4^{P}	AR Fox defeated Shane Taylor by pinfall	Singles match	10:20
5	Gravity defeated Komander (with Alex Abrahantes) by pinfall	Singles match	10:15
6	Samoa Joe (c) defeated Dalton Castle (with The Boys (Brent Tate and Brandon Tate)) by technical submission	Singles match for the ROH World Television Championship	13:35
7	Aussie Open (Kyle Fletcher and Mark Davis) defeated The Lucha Brothers (Penta El Zero Miedo and Rey Fénix) (c) (with Alex Abrahantes), The Kingdom (Matt Taven and Mike Bennett) (with Maria Kanellis-Bennett), and Best Friends (Chuck Taylor and Trent Beretta) by pinfall	Four-way tag team match for the ROH World Tag Team Championship	17:13
8	Mogul Embassy (Brian Cage, Bishop Kaun, and Toa Liona) (c) (with Prince Nana) defeated Leon Ruffin and Six or Nine (Master Wato and Ryusuke Taguchi) by pinfall	Six-man tag team match for the ROH World Six-Man Tag Team Championship	12:20
9	Katsuyori Shibata (c) defeated Daniel Garcia by pinfall	Pure wrestling rules match for the ROH Pure Championship; Christopher Daniels, Jimmy Jacobs, and Jerry Lynn served as the judges.	14:35
10	The Dark Order (Evil Uno, Alex Reynolds, and John Silver) defeated Stu Grayson and The Righteous (Vincent and Dutch) by pinfall	Fight Without Honor	16:40
11	Claudio Castagnoli (c) defeated Pac by pinfall	Singles match for the ROH World Championship	18:30
12	Athena (c) defeated Willow Nightingale by technical submission	Singles match for the ROH Women's World Championship	20:30
(c) / – the champion(s) heading into the match; P / – the match was broadcast on the pre-show

=== ROH World Television Championship Eliminator Tournament bracket ===
Semifinals; ROH Honor Club TV; July 13
Dalton Castle	Pin
Tony Nese	8:11
Shane Taylor	Pin
Shawn Dean	6:47

Final; ROH Honor Club TV; July 20
Dalton Castle	Pin
Shane Taylor	8:34

== See also ==
- 2023 in professional wrestling
- List of Ring of Honor pay-per-view events
