= Diamante (American wrestler) =

American professional wrestler

- Diamante at Death Before Dishonor 2026

Personal information
- Born: Priscilla Zúñiga; July 14, 1991 (age 35) Miami Gardens, Florida, U.S.
- Life partners: Kiera Hogan (2019–present)
- Family: KC Navarro (brother)

Professional wrestling career
- Ring name(s): Adrenaline; Angel Rose; Diamante; Priscilla Zúñiga
- Billed height: 5 ft 1 in (155 cm)
- Billed weight: 114 lb (52 kg)
- Billed from: The 305
- Trained by: Rusty Brooks
- Debut: 2008

Priscilla Zúñiga (born July 14, 1991), better known by her ring name Diamante, is a Cuban-American professional wrestler signed to All Elite Wrestling (AEW) and its sister promotion, Ring of Honor (ROH), where she is a member of the M.I.T stable. She is also known for her time with Impact Wrestling and on the independent circuit.

== Professional wrestling career ==
=== Independent circuit (2008–present) ===
Zúñiga wrestled on the independent circuit under the ring name Angel Rose, primarily working for Independent Championship Wrestling in Florida, where she is a four-time ICW Women's Champion as well as a winner of the ICW Hard Knocks Championship and the ICW Championship. She also worked for various other Florida-based promotions such as IGNITE Wrestling, RONIN Pro Wrestling, and Shine Wrestling. Zuniga made an appearance on the March 22, 2017, episode of NXT, working under her real name as an enhancement talent in a quick loss to Asuka.

Zúñiga joined Women of Wrestling (WOW) in July 2019 where she performed under the ring name Adrenaline. Adrenaline teamed with Fire in the tag team tournament for the vacant WOW World Tag Team Championship in which they won in the second-season finale on AXS TV on May 16, which aired on tape delay on November 23.

On September 5, 2019, Diamante made her debut for Empower Wrestling and defeated Gemma Cross in first round to determine Empower Wrestling's first champion. However, she was defeated by Nicole Savoy on September 26, 2019, and was eliminated in the semi-final of the tournament.

=== Impact Wrestling (2017–2019) ===
Zúñiga joined Impact Wrestling as part of The Latin American Xchange in March 2017, and made her debut along with the rest of the group on the March 23 episode of Impact Wrestling under the ring name Diamante. On the April 6 episode of Impact Wrestling, Diamante made her in-ring debut, participating in a gauntlet match to become number one contender for the Impact Wrestling Knockouts Championship, but was eliminated by Brandi Rhodes. During their feud with Alberto El Patron, she and Homicide beat his brother El Hijo de Dos Caras on July 20. In July 2017, Diamante suffered a knee injury and underwent surgery to repair her left ACL and was out of action for the rest of the year. She returned to Impact on the August 25, 2018, episode of Xplosion in a match against Su Yung, but then was released on January 28, 2019.

In the spring of 2019, Diamante fully recovered from her injury and began wrestling on the American independent scene again.

=== All Elite Wrestling (2020–present) ===
Diamante made her All Elite Wrestling (AEW) in-ring debut on the January 15, 2020 of Dark. The event, on the campus of the University of Miami, was a singles match between herself and Big Swole, which she lost. Diamante made her Dynamite debut on July 22, with a win over Ivelisse. This victory would earn her a non-title match against the AEW Women's Champion Hikaru Shida; however, Diamante was unsuccessful.

Diamante would begin teaming with Ivelisse in the AEW Women's Tag Team Cup Tournament after they were paired together in The Deadly Draw. The team would advance to the finals after defeating Dasha Gonzalez and Rachael Ellering in the first round, and Anna Jay and Tay Conti in the semi-finals. They would ultimately win the tournament defeating The Nightmare Sisters (Allie and Brandi Rhodes) in the finals. Diamante and Ivelisse would again team up on the November 24, 2020, episode of Dark, defeating Lady Frost and "Bionic Beast" Jenna.

In July 2023, it was reported that Diamante signed a full-time deal with AEW.

=== Ring of Honor (2023–present) ===
Diamante made her Ring of Honor (ROH) debut, AEW's sister promotion, on the April 27, 2023, episode of ROH on Honor Club, in a losing effort against Skye Blue. Following her debut, Diamante was on a start of a winning streak, defeating different competitors such as Teal Piper and Trish Adora. However, on the June 22 episode of ROH, Diamante lost to Leila Grey, after Grey's manager Mark Sterling distracted Diamante. The following week, Diamante defeated Grey in a rematch.

On August 1, 2023, it was announced that Diamante will be taking on Athena for the ROH Women's World Championship. During this match, Diamante was not successful.

On February 14, 2024, Diamante entered the inaugural ROH Women's World Television Championship tournament where she defeated Kiera Hogan in the first round. During the second round of the ROH Women's World Television Championship tournament Diamante lost to Billie Starkz.

On the March 29, 2025 tapings of Ring of Honor Minion leader Athena recruited Diamante to ROH female alliance stable M.I.T..

== Other media ==
Zúñiga played the part of Ava Hernandez in Len Kabasinski's 2022 film Pact of Vengeance, which also stars Leo Fong.

== Personal life ==
Zúñiga is of Cuban descent.

On July 20, 2019, it was announced that Zúñiga is in a relationship with fellow professional wrestler Kiera Hogan.

Zúñiga's younger brother is also a professional wrestler, who currently performs in Total Nonstop Action Wrestling (TNA) under the ring name KC Navarro.

== Championships and accomplishments ==
- All Elite Wrestling
  - AEW Women's Tag Team Cup (2020) – with Ivelisse
- Independent Championship Wrestling
  - ICW Championship (1 time)
  - ICW Hard Knocks Championship (1 time)
  - ICW Women's Championship (4 times)
- Pro Wrestling Illustrated
  - Ranked No. 133 of the top 150 women's wrestlers in the PWI Women's 150 in 2021
- Queens of Combat
  - QOC Championship (1 time)
- Women of Wrestling
  - WOW World Tag Team Championship (1 time) – with Fire
  - WOW Tag Team Championship Tournament (2019) – with Fire
