= Spark Joshi World Championship =

Professional wrestling women's championship

Details
- Promotion: Spark Joshi Puroresu of America
- Date established: June 2023
- Current champion: Hazuki
- Date won: April 17, 2025
Statistics
- First champion: Miyu Yamashita
- Most reigns: All titleholders (1 time)
- Longest reign: Hazuki (269+ days)
- Shortest reign: Sumie Sakai (<1 day)
- Oldest champion: Sumie Sakai (52 years, 135 days)
- Youngest champion: Billie Starkz (18 years, 363 days)
- Lightest champion: Starlight Kid (99 lbs)

The Spark Joshi World Championship is a women's professional wrestling world championship owned by the Spark Joshi Puroresu of America promotion. The title, which is situated at the top of Joshi Puroresu's championship hierarchy, was introduced on June 11, 2023, when Miyu Yamashita became the inaugural champion by defeating Rachael Ellering in a decision match.

== History ==
On June 11, 2023, during Spark Joshi's first event Ignite East, Miyu Yamashita defeated Rachael Ellering to become the inaugural champion. The first defense of the title was Yamashita's successful defense against Delilah Doom on June 16, during Spark Joshi's second event Ignite West.

== Reigns ==
As of January 11, 2026, there have been a total of five reigns shared between five different champions and one vacancy. Miyu Yamashita was the inaugural champion after defeating Rachael Ellering at Ignite East on June 11, 2023, in Newark, New Jersey. Hazuki is the current champion in her first reign. She won the title by defeating Lena Kross at Spark Trailblaze 2024 on April 17, 2025, in Las Vegas, Nevada.

Key
No.	Overall reign number
Reign	Reign number for the specific champion
Days	Number of days held
+	Current reign is changing daily

No.	Champion	Championship change			Reign statistics		Notes	Ref.
No.	Champion	Date	Event	Location	Reign	Days	Notes	Ref.
1	Miyu Yamashita	June 11, 2023	Ignite East	Newark, NJ	1	122	Defeated Rachael Ellering in a decision match to become the inaugural champion.	
2	Billie Starkz	October 11, 2023	Rising Heat West	Carson, CA	1	179		
3	Sumie Sakai	April 7, 2024	Spark Trailblaze 2024	Paulsboro, NJ	1	<1		
4	Starlight Kid	April 7, 2024	Spark Trailblaze 2024	Paulsboro, NJ	1	254		
—	Vacated	December 17, 2024	—	Tokyo, Japan	—	—	Starlight Kid vacated the title to focus on her pursuit of the Wonder of Stardom Championship.	
5	Hazuki	April 17, 2025	Spark Joshi Lady Luck	Las Vegas, NV	1	269+	Defeated Lena Kross to win the vacant title.	
