= Queen Aminata =

Guinean professional wrestler (born 1993)

- Aminata in 2026

Personal information
- Born: Aminata Sylla; June 10, 1993 (age 33) Conakry, Guinea

Professional wrestling career
- Ring name: Queen Aminata
- Billed height: 5 ft 9 in (175 cm)
- Billed weight: 145 lb (66 kg)
- Billed from: Guinea, West Africa
- Trained by: Ohio Pro Wrestling Academy (James Avery)
- Debut: 2017

Aminata Sylla (born June 10, 1993), better known by her ring name Queen Aminata, is a Guinean professional wrestler. As of February 2024, she is signed to All Elite Wrestling (AEW), where she is the current AEW TBS Champion in her first reign. She also makes appearances in AEW's sister promotion Ring of Honor (ROH). She is also known for her time in Ohio Valley Wrestling (OVW) and on the American independent circuit.

== Early life ==
Sylla immigrated from Guinea to the United States in April 2013, having previously lived and studied in Paris, France. While there, Sylla studied private international law and was qualified to practice in France.

== Professional wrestling career ==
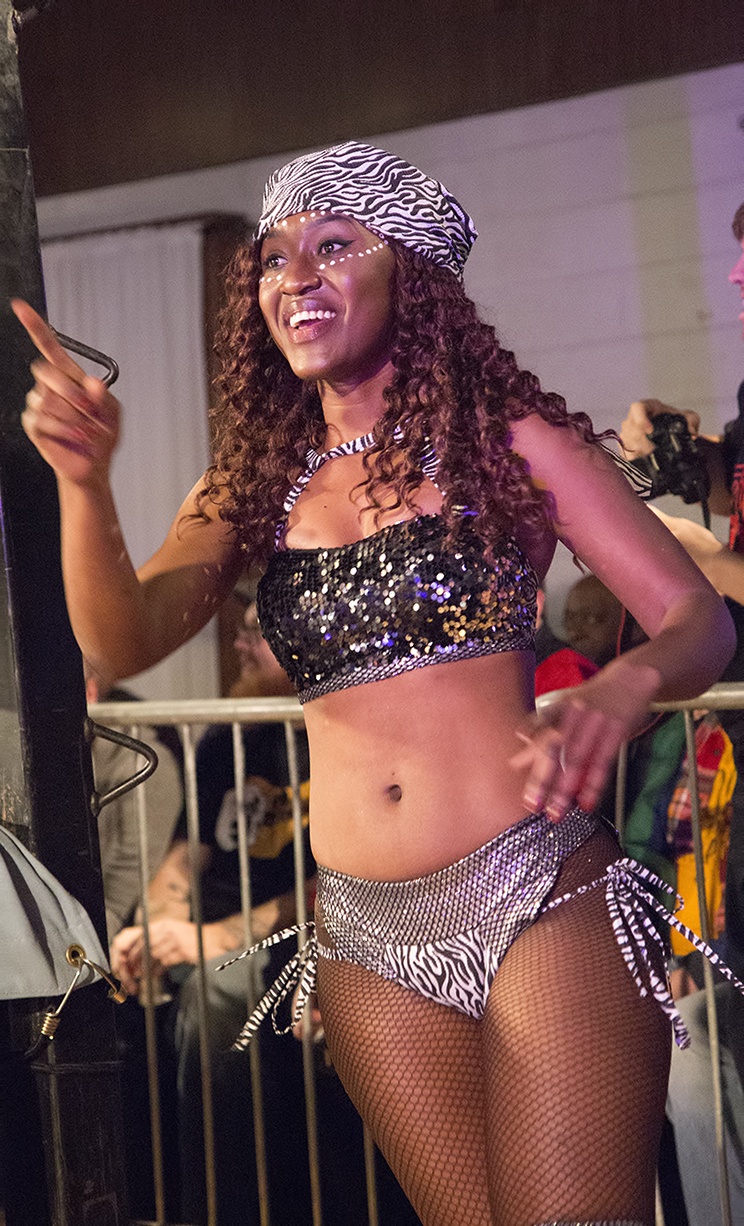
Aminata in 2018

=== Early career (2017–2020) ===
Aminata made her debut in 2017, wrestling largely on the independent circuit in Ohio. On April 30, 2017, she wrestled at a WWE house show teaming with Kaylee, losing to Asuka and Kairi Sane. In 2020, she wrestled in Japan for various promotions including Sendai Girls.

=== All Elite Wrestling / Ring of Honor (2021–present) ===
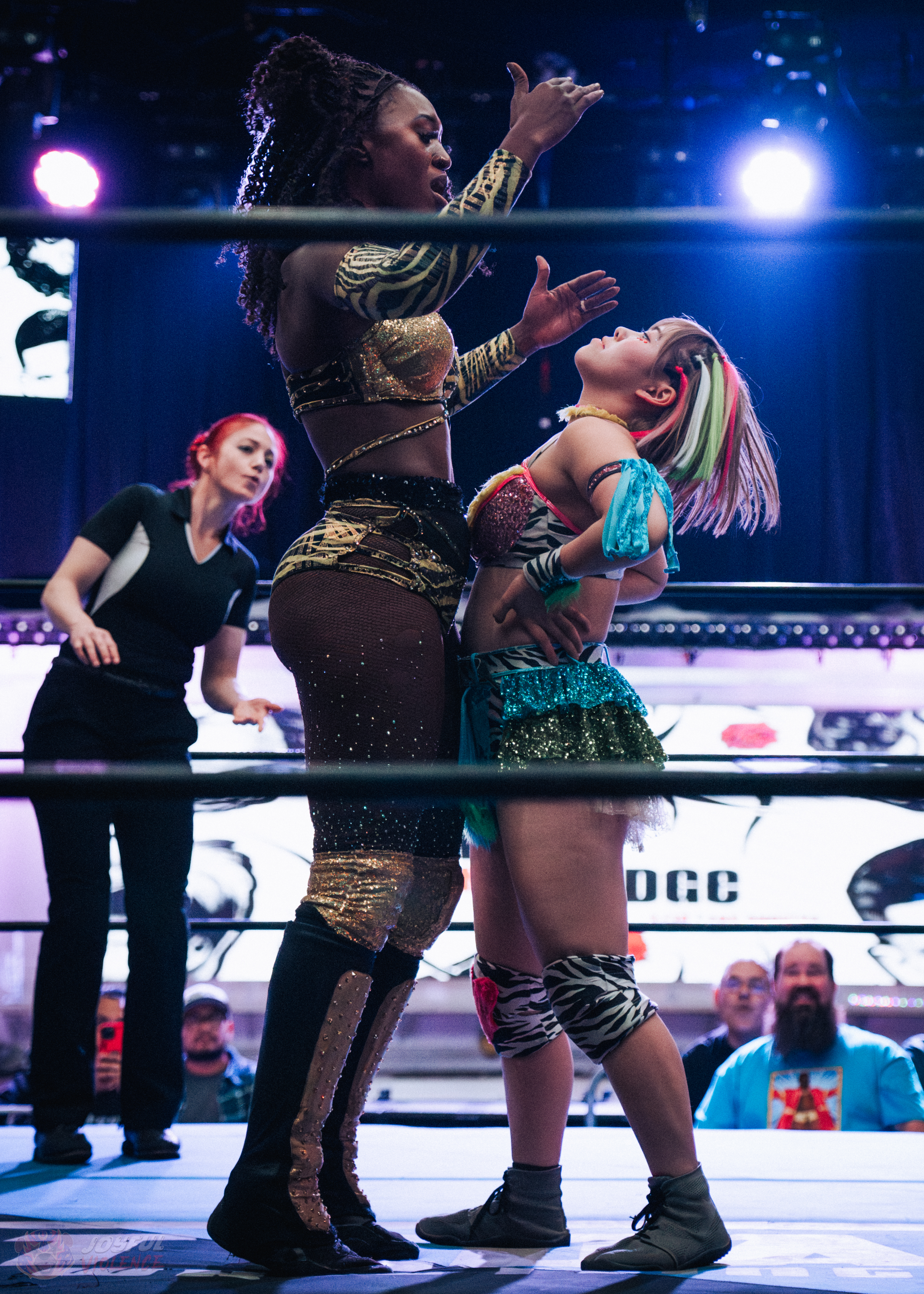
Aminata (left) towering over Mio Momono in February 2024

On April 7, 2021, she made her All Elite Wrestling (AEW) debut on Dark, teaming with Amber Nova and losing to Big Swole and Red Velvet. She made her television debut on November 23, 2022, on Rampage, losing to Hikaru Shida. She made her debut for AEW's sister promotion Ring of Honor (ROH) on the December 23 episode of Ring of Honor Wrestling, defeating Maya World.

On January 3, 2024, she made her Dynamite debut, losing to newcomer Mariah May. On the February 16 edition of Rampage, Aminata gained her first victory in AEW by defeating Anna Jay. Following the match, it was announced that Aminata was officially signed to the company. In the same month, Aminata entered the tournament to crown the inaugural ROH Women's World Television Champion. She defeated J–Rod in the first round, Taya Valkyrie in the quarterfinals, and Red Velvet in the semifinals to face Billie Starkz in the final at Supercard of Honor. At the event on April 5, Aminata lost to Starkz after Starkz feigned an injury, using the distraction to choke out Aminata and win the title. On July 26 at Death Before Dishonor, Aminata challenged Athena for the ROH Women's World Championship. She lost after interference from Athena's stablemate Lexy Nair. On the October 16 episode of Dynamite, Aminata unsuccessfully challenged Mercedes Moné for the AEW TBS Championship.

On July 12, 2025 at All In, Aminata competed in the women's Casino Gauntlet match, which was won by Athena. In November 2025, Aminata revealed that she had suffered a neck injury and would be out of action. Aminata returned on the April 8, 2026 episode of Dynamite, where she unsuccessfully challenged Willow Nightingale for the TBS Championship. On October 6 at Grand Slam France, Aminata unsuccessfully challenged Mercedes Moné for the AEW Women's World Championship.

At Fright Night Dynamite on October 28, 2026, Aminata defeated Persephone to win the AEW TBS Championship, marking her first title in AEW. On November 4, Aminata competed in a six-on-six Blood and Guts match at the namesake event, where her team was victorious.

== Personal life ==
Sylla has stated she is a polyglot who can speak four languages: French, English, Susu and Fulani. She is a Muslim, as well as a mother.

== Championships and accomplishments ==
- All Elite Wrestling
  - AEW TBS Championship (1 time, current)
- Deadlock Pro-Wrestling
  - DPW Women's Worlds Championship (1 time)
  - Battle Of The Best Tournament (2025)
- Generation Championship Wrestling
  - GCW Women's Championship (1 time)
  - Diamond Cup (2020)
- IWA Mid-South
  - Miss Independent 2
- Pro Wrestling Illustrated
  - Ranked No. 55 of the top 250 female wrestlers in the PWI Women's 250 in 2024
