= Billie Starkz =

American professional wrestler (born 2004)

- Starkz at Death Before Dishonor 2026

Personal information
- Born: Lillian Renia Bridget; December 8, 2004 (age 21) New Albany, Indiana, U.S.

Professional wrestling career
- Ring names: Billie Starkz; Pizza Cat Jr.
- Trained by: Raul LaMotta (Grindhouse Pro Wrestling Academy); Rudy Switchblade (Grindhouse Pro Wrestling Academy); 2 Tuff Tony (Grindhouse Pro Wrestling Academy)
- Debut: October 13, 2018

Lillian Renia Bridget (born December 8, 2004), better known by the ring name Billie Starkz, is an American professional wrestler. She is signed to All Elite Wrestling (AEW), but predominantly appears in AEW's sister promotion Ring of Honor (ROH), where she is a member of the M.I.T stable and a former one-time and the inaugural ROH Women's World Television Champion.

Bridget has also wrestled in numerous promotions such as Tokyo Joshi Pro-Wrestling, Major League Wrestling, and Game Changer Wrestling where she is the former one-time JCW World Champion.

== Professional wrestling career ==
=== Independent circuit (2018–present) ===
Starkz began training in wrestling at age 13 in Jeffersonville, Indiana, making her professional wrestling debut in October 2018. According to a 2023 story by local TV station WDRB, during her first weeks at Atherton High School in Louisville, Kentucky in 2019, "a caring teacher pulled her into the hall to ask questions about her parents and home life" because she showed up with bumps and bruises resulting from wrestling.

In 2020, she began working for Game Changer Wrestling (GCW) and on October 10 of that year, she competed in a 30-person battle royal at Joey Janela's Spring Break 4.

On June 25, 2022, Starkz won the H2O Hybrid Championship. On November 12, at BLP Slamilton, Starkz defeated Calvin Tankman to win the BLP Heavyweight Championship.

=== All Elite Wrestling / Ring of Honor (2022–present) ===
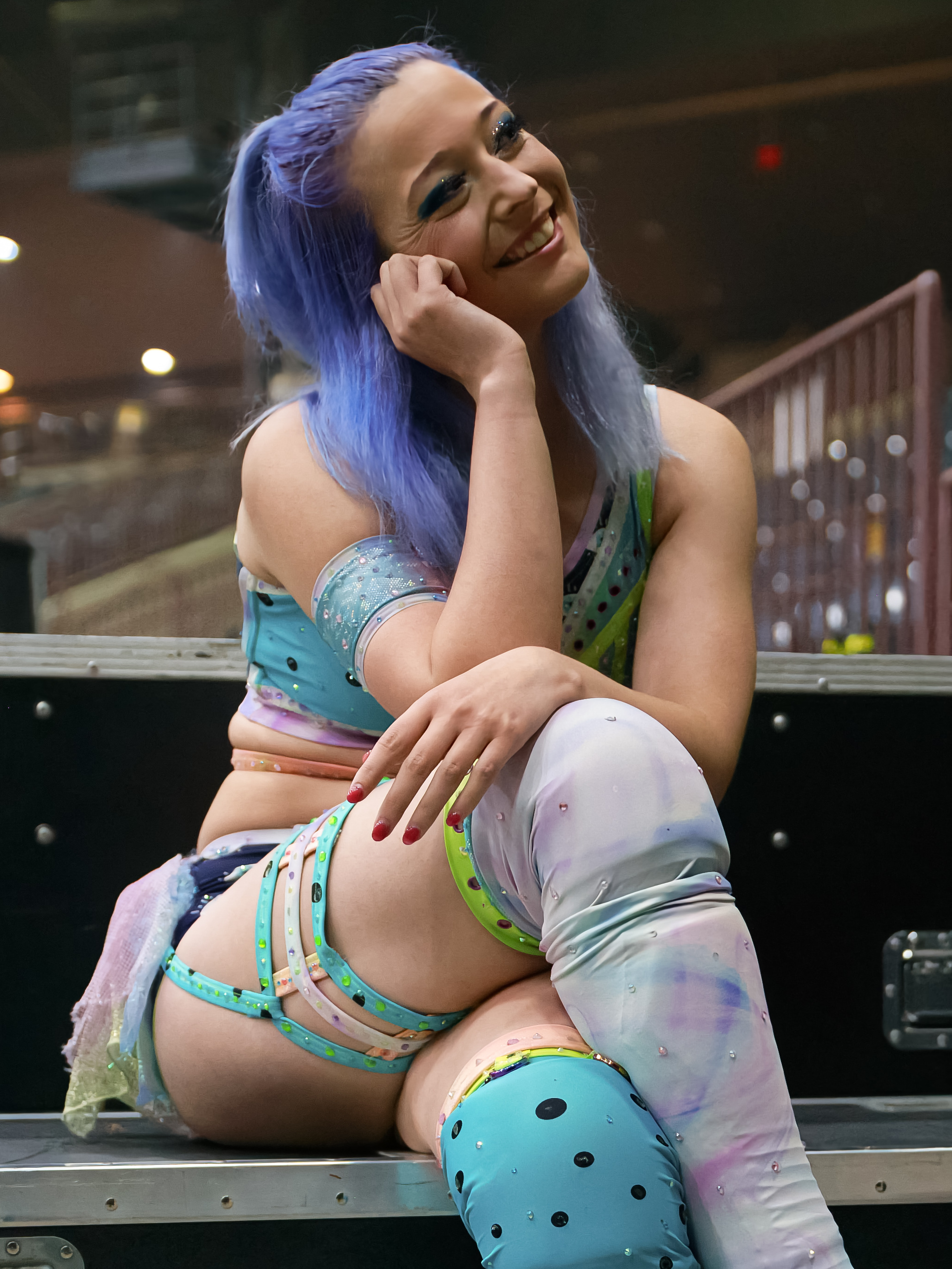
Starkz in 2023

On the December 27, 2022, episode of AEW Dark, Starkz made her debut, losing to Red Velvet. On April 7, 2023, at Battle of the Belts VI, Jade Cargill defeated Starkz to retain the AEW TBS Championship. Four days later, it was reported that Starkz had been signed by AEW.

On the March 9, 2023, episode of Ring of Honor Wrestling, Starkz made her Ring of Honor (ROH) debut, where she lost to Trish Adora. Two weeks later, she had her first win in ROH when she defeated Miranda Alize. On June 25 at Forbidden Door, Starkz competed in the Owen Hart Foundation Women's Tournament, losing to Athena in the quarterfinals of the tournament.

In late 2023, Starkz along with Lexy Nair joined forces with ROH Women's World Champion Athena as her Minion in Training (M.I.T.). Starkz would challenge Athena for the ROH Women's World Championship at Final Battle in 2023 and 2024, being defeated both times. Between those matches, she became the first ROH Women's World Television Champion after she defeated Queen Aminata at Supercard of Honor. On July 26 at Death Before Dishonor, Starkz lost the ROH Women's World Television Championship to Red Velvet, ending her reign at 112 days. Despite Starkz teasing leaving M.I.T., on the December 26 episode of ROH Wrestling, Athena expelled Nair and declared that Starkz and herself will be Minions forever. Starkz made her return to AEW programming on the March 19 episode of Dynamite, where she unsuccessfully challenged Mercedes Moné for the TBS Championship. On the March 29, 2025, episode of Collision, Starkz was announced as an entrant in the women's bracket of the Owen Hart Cup, a tournament where the winner will receive an AEW Women's World Championship match at All In. On the April 12 episode of Collision, Starkz was eliminated in the first round of the tournament by Jamie Hayter.

=== Major League Wrestling (2023) ===
On the February 28, 2023, episode of MLW Underground Wrestling, Starkz made her MLW debut, defeating Kayla Kassidy. On the March 21 episode of Underground Wrestling, she faced Taya Valkyrie for the MLW Women's Featherweight Championship but lost the match. Starkz then faced B3cca twice at SuperFight and War Chamber, both in a winning effort.

=== Consejo Mundial de Lucha Libre (2025–present) ===
On April 24, 2025, it was announced that Starkz would debut and replace Taya Valkyrie due to her injury and would team up with Lady Frost. On April 25, 2025, Starkz and Lady Frost defeated Las Infernales (Zeuxis and Dark Silueta) at the 69th anniversary of the Arena México. On April 26, 2025, Starkz and Lady Frost lost to Zeuxis and La Jarochita at the Arena Coliseo.

== Personal life ==
Shortly before her 2023 graduation from Atherton High School in Louisville, Bridget had maintained a 4.0 grade point average while taking several honors courses, despite her frequent travel for wrestling shows.

== Championships and accomplishments ==
- Pro Wrestling Illustrated
  - Ranked No. 52 of the top 150 female wrestlers in the PWI Women's 150 in 2022
  - Ranked No. 96 of the top 500 singles wrestlers in the PWI 500 in 2023
- Ring of Honor
  - ROH Women's World Television Championship (1 time, inaugural)
  - ROH Women's World Television Championship Tournament (2024)
- Spark Joshi Puroresu of America
  - Spark Joshi World Championship (1 time)
- The Wrestling Revolver
  - Women's Grand Prix (2023)
