= ROH Women's World Television Championship =

Professional wrestling championship

- The ROH Women's World Television Championship belt

Details
- Promotion: Ring of Honor
- Date established: December 16, 2023
- Current champion: Vacant
- Date won: November 21, 2026

Other names
- ROH Women's World Television Championship (2023–2025; 2025–present); Undisputed ROH Women's World Television Championship (2025)
Statistics
- First champion: Billie Starkz
- Most reigns: Red Velvet (2 reigns)
- Longest reign: Red Velvet; 1st reign (481 days)
- Shortest reign: Mercedes Moné (16 days)
- Oldest champion: Mercedes Moné (33 years, 297 days)
- Youngest champion: Billie Starkz (19 years, 119 days)

The ROH Women's World Television Championship is a women's professional wrestling world television championship created and promoted by the American promotion Ring of Honor (ROH). Established on December 16, 2023, the inaugural champion was Billie Starkz. In addition to being in ROH, the championship is also occasionally defended on All Elite Wrestling's (AEW) programs, as AEW and ROH are both owned by Tony Khan. The current champion is Red Velvet, who is in her record-setting second reign. She won the title by defeating Mercedes Moné at Final Battle on December 5, 2025.

== History ==
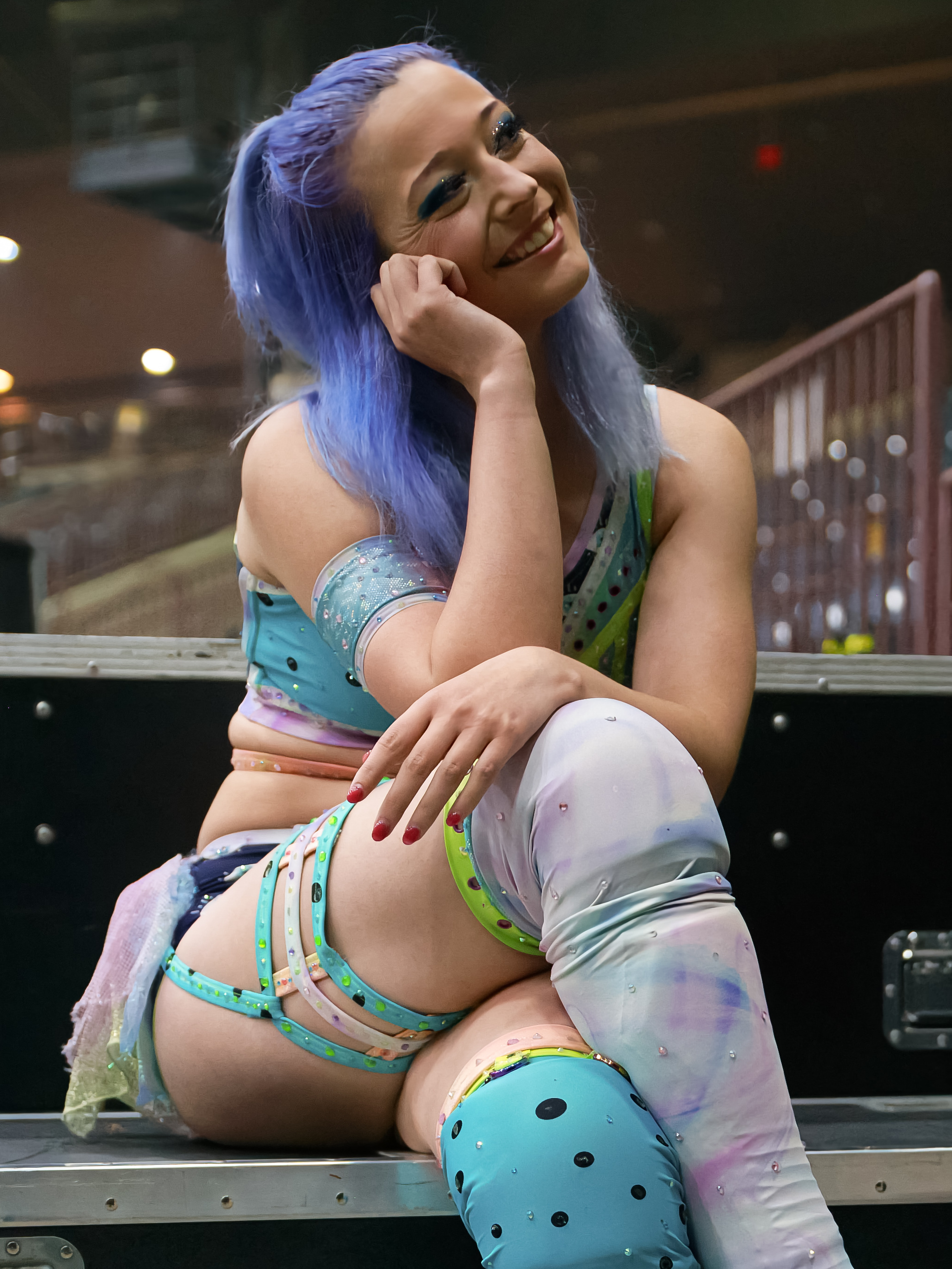
Inaugural champion Billie Starkz

Ring of Honor owner Tony Khan unveiled the championship on December 16, 2023, during a taping of Ring of Honor Wrestling. The championship is a secondary title in the ROH women's division. The design of the belt matches the men's World Television Championship. Several names were confirmed for the inaugural tournament with the likes of Leyla Hirsch, Kiera Hogan, Lady Frost, Rachael Ellering and Billie Starkz.

On February 10, 2024, taping of Ring of Honor, more names were announced for the inaugural ROH Women's World Television Championship such as Taya Valkyrie, Sussy Love, Red Velvet, Sandra Moone, Abadon, Viva Van and Robyn Renegade. Where only four names advanced in the tournament such as Taya Valkyrie, Red Velvet, Abadon and firstly entered participate Billie Starkz as Taya Valkyrie defeated Sussy Love, Red Velvet defeated Sandra Moone, Abadon defeated Viva Van and Billie Starkz defeated Robyn Renegade in the first round. On February 14, 2024, J-Rod, Queen Aminata, Mercedes Martinez, Trish Adora and Diamante were announced as participants. During the second part of the first rounds, Queen Aminata, Leyla Hirsch, Mercedes Martinez and Diamante were prosperous at advancing in the tournament.

On the February 24, 2024, taping of ROH, the second round of the ROH Women's World Television Championship tournament began as Red Velvet defeated Leyla Hirsch while Queen Aminata defeated Taya Valkyrie to advance.

On March 7, 2024, taping of ROH, another part of the second round of the ROH Women's World Television Championship tournament took place where Billie Starkz defeated Diamante and Mercedes Martinez defeated Abandon to advance.

On the March 16, 2024, taping of ROH, at the semifinals of the tournament, Queen Amanita defeated Red Velvet and Billie Starkz defeated Mercedes Martinez, leaving it down to Queen Amanita and Billie Starkz on who will become the inaugural champion.

On April 5, 2024, at Supercard of Honor, Billie Starkz defeated Queen Aminata to become the inaugural ROH Women's World Television Championship holder.

== Inaugural championship tournament (2024) ==
=== Tournament bracket ===
First Round; ROH Wrestling (February 15 and 22)
Kiera Hogan	6:31
Diamanté	Pin
Billie Starkz	Sub
Robyn Renegade	9:47
Mercedes Martinez	Sub
Trish Adora	9:46
Viva Van	5:48
Abadon	Pin
Rachael Ellering	10:49
Leyla Hirsch	Pin
Sandra Moone	9:01
Red Velvet	Pin
J-Rod	6:04
Queen Aminata	Pin
Sussy Love	7:19
Taya Valkyrie	Pin

Quarterfinals; ROH Wrestling (February 29, March 7 and 14)
Diamanté	11:38
Billie Starkz	Pin
Mercedes Martinez	Pin
Abadon	9:46
Leyla Hirsch	9:46
Red Velvet	Pin
Queen Aminata	Pin
Taya Valkyrie	8:52

Semifinals; ROH Wrestling (March 21)
Billie Starkz	Pin
Mercedes Martinez	11:33
Red Velvet	9:24
Queen Aminata	Pin

Final; Supercard of Honor (April 5)
Billie Starkz	Sub
Queen Aminata	17:42

1 Originally scheduled participant Lady Frost was on tour in Mexico when the tournament began, so she was removed.

== Belt design ==
The ROH Women's Television Championship design is very similar to the June 22, 2023, design of the ROH World Television Championship belt design that was presented to champion Samoa Joe on that episode of Ring of Honor Wrestling. To represent difference this design of the title has the word women's at the top in the center piece of the championship.

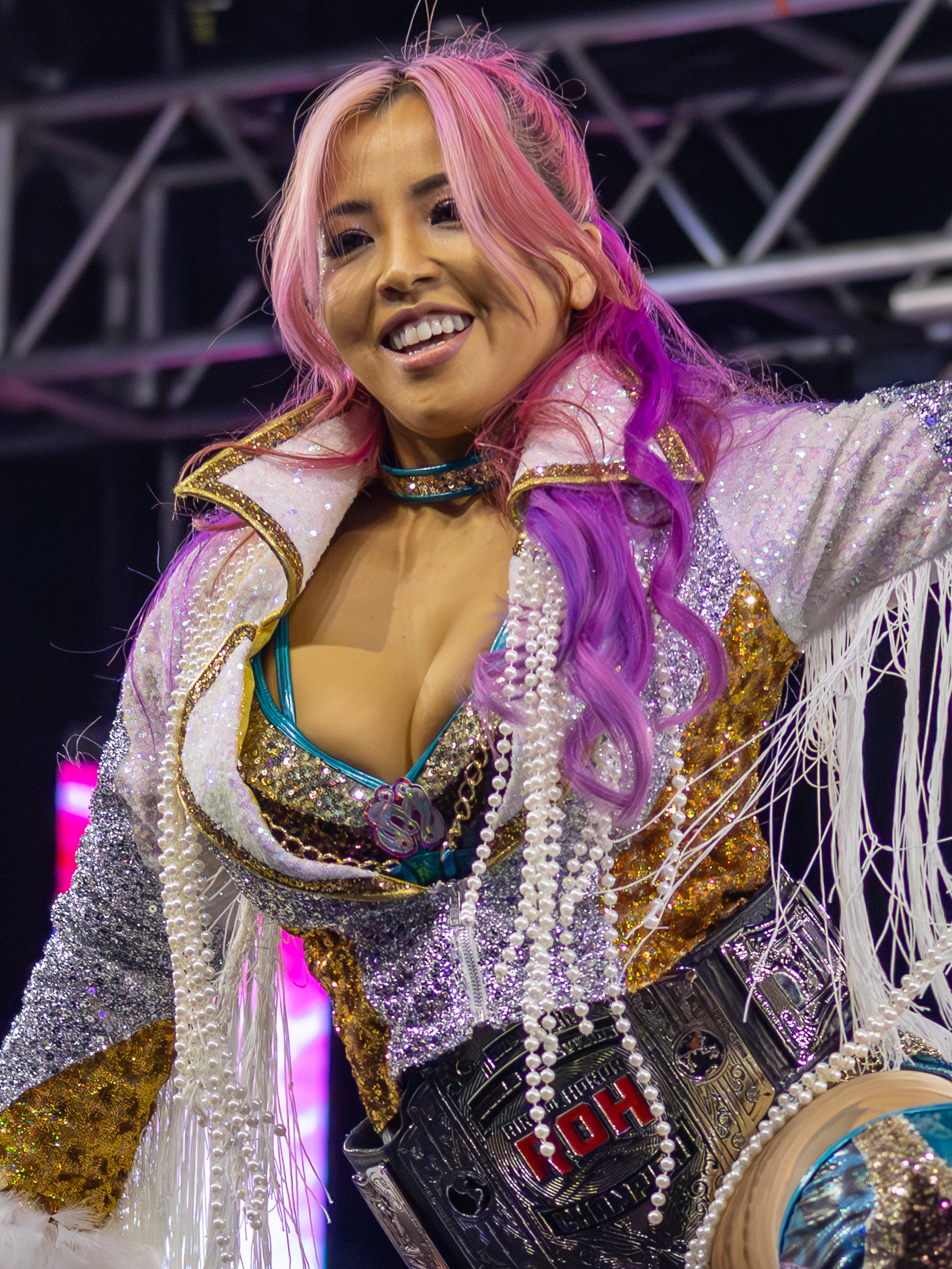
Former interim champion Mina Shirakawa shown here with the current title design.

On September 20, 2024, Red Velvet debuted her own custom version of the championship with a red leather strap.

== Reigns ==
As of November 22, 2026, there have been four reigns between three champions. Billie Starkz was the inaugural champion.

The championship is vacated afther the previous champion, Red Velvet, had to vacated the title.

=== Names ===
Name	Years
ROH Women's World Television Championship	December 16, 2023 – November 19, 2025; November 19, 2025 – present
Undisputed ROH Women's World Television Championship	November 19, 2025

Key
No.	Overall reign number
Reign	Reign number for the specific champion
Days	Number of days held
+	Current reign is changing daily

No.	Champion	Championship change			Reign statistics		Notes	Ref.
No.	Champion	Date	Event	Location	Reign	Days	Notes	Ref.
Ring of Honor (ROH)
1	Billie Starkz	April 5, 2024	Supercard of Honor	Philadelphia, PA	1	112	Defeated Queen Aminata in the tournament finals to become the inaugural champion.	
2	Red Velvet	July 26, 2024	Death Before Dishonor	Arlington, TX	1	481		
—	Mina Shirakawa (Interim)	July 11, 2025	Supercard of Honor	Arlington, TX	—	99	Lineal champion Red Velvet was originally scheduled to defend the title, but pulled out a few days prior due to an undisclosed injury. Shirakawa defeated Miyu Yamashita, Persephone, and Yuka Sakazaki in a four-way match to win the interim championship.	
—	Mercedes Moné (Interim)	October 18, 2025	WrestleDream	St. Louis, MO	—	32	This was a Winner Takes All match in which Moné also defended her AEW TBS Championship.	
3	Mercedes Moné	November 19, 2025	Collision	Boston, MA	1	16	This was an All Elite Wrestling event. Moné defeated lineal champion Red Velvet in a title unification match to become the undisputed champion.	
4	Red Velvet	December 5, 2025	Final Battle	Columbus, OH	2	351		
—	Vacated	November 21, 2026	—	—	—	—	Tony Khan vacated the title due to Velvet was not medically cleared to defend it.	

== Combined reigns ==
As of November 22, 2026.

†	Indicates the current champion
<1	Reign was less than a day

Rank	Wrestler	No. of reigns	Combined days
1	Red Velvet	2	832
2	Billie Starkz	1	112
—	Mina Shirakawa (interim champion)	–	99
—	Mercedes Mone (interim champion)	–	32
3	Mercedes Moné	1	16
