= Lexy Nair =

American sports broadcaster (born 1996)

Personal information
- Born: Alexandra Nair; August 11, 1996 (age 30) Roanoke, Virginia, U.S.
- Education: EI School of Professional Makeup
- Spouse: Big Bill (m. 2024)

Professional wrestling career
- Ring name: Lexy Nair
- Billed height: 5 ft 8 in (173 cm)
- Billed weight: 135 lb (61 kg)
- Billed from: Atlanta, Georgia
- Debut: January 29, 2020

Alexandra Nair (born August 11, 1996) is an American sports broadcaster. She is signed to All Elite Wrestling (AEW) and Ring of Honor (ROH), where she works as an interviewer.

== Early life ==
Nair was born in Roanoke, Virginia, on August 11, 1996. She was raised in a suburb of Philadelphia, Pennsylvania and Baltimore, Maryland. Where after graduating High School, she moved to Los Angeles, California. She then attended the EI School of Professional Makeup where she received a degree in Professional Makeup Artistry.

== Career ==
=== All Elite Wrestling / Ring of Honor (2020–present) ===
In January 2020, Nair signed with the American professional wrestling promotion AEW and was given the ring name Lexy Nair. She debuted on the January 29, 2020, episode of Dynamite held in Cleveland, Ohio as a backstage interviewer. Since April 10, 2021, she hosts the weekly show Outside The Ring.

On September 21, 2023 in Ring of Honor, Nair and Billie Starkz became ROH Women's World Champion Athena's Minions in Training (M.I.T.). On the December 26, 2024 episode of Ring of Honor Wrestling, Nair was kicked out of M.I.T by Athena after nearly costing her the title match at Final Battle.

== Personal life ==
In 2015, Diamond Dallas Page married her mother Brenda Nair. They separated in 2019 and their divorce was finalized in 2020. She has a sister. On May 8, 2021, she announced that she was in a relationship with fellow wrestler William Morrissey (known as Big Bill as of 2023). They were engaged on December 24, 2022. The two were married in December 2024 in Mexico.
