= Red Velvet (wrestler) =

Colombian-American professional wrestler (born 1992)

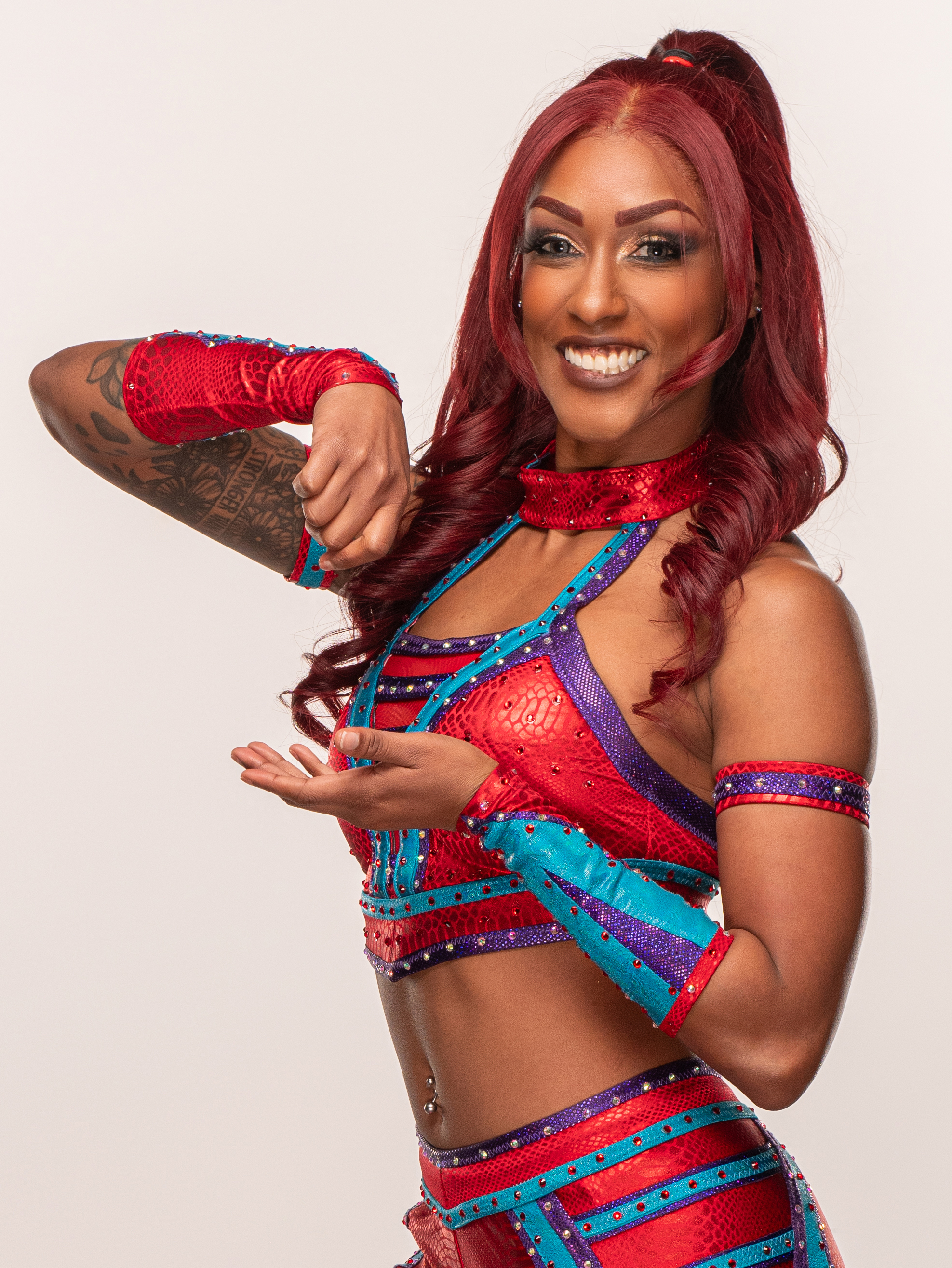
- Velvet in 2024

Personal information
- Born: Stephanie M. Cardona; June 3, 1992 (age 34) Miami, Florida, U.S.
- Family: Prudencio Cardona (father); Ricardo Cardona (uncle)

Professional wrestling career
- Ring name(s): Chasity Cardona; Red Velvett; Red Velvet
- Billed height: 5 ft 1 in (155 cm)
- Billed from: Miami, Florida, U.S. Straight Outta Your Momma's Kitchen
- Trained by: Fighting Evolution Wrestling; Bryan Danielson
- Debut: March 24, 2016

Stephanie M. Cardona (born June 3, 1992), better known by the ring name Red Velvet, is a Colombian-American professional wrestler and dancer. She is signed to All Elite Wrestling (AEW) and sister promotion Ring of Honor (ROH). She is a two times ROH Women's World Television Champion.

== Professional wrestling career ==
=== Independent circuit (2016–2021) ===
Velvet began training at Fighting Evolution Wrestling (FEW) under JB Cool, based in Miami, Florida, in 2015. She made her in-ring debut, under the ring name Red Velvett, on March 24, 2016, in a singles match against Rebel, in a losing effort. On August 19, 2016, Velvet won the FEW Women's Championship in a triple threat match against Jade and Rebel. On January 21, 2017, Velvet lost the title to Lea Nox. On November 2, 2018, she made her SHINE debut against Avery Taylor, which she was pinned.

=== All Elite Wrestling / Ring of Honor (2020–present) ===
On June 10, 2020, Velvet made her All Elite Wrestling debut on AEW Dark, facing Allie and Brandi Rhodes in a tag team match, which she lost. On the June 24 episode of AEW Dynamite, Velvet made her Dynamite debut and faced Hikaru Shida which Velvet lost via pinfall. On October 13, Velvet won her first match in AEW on AEW Dark, by pinning Elayna Black. On the December 9 episode of AEW Dynamite Jade Cargill attacked Velvet backstage. On January 27, 2021, it was then announced that Velvet and Cody Rhodes will be taking on Jade Cargill and Shaquille O'Neal in a mixed tag team match on the March 3 episode of Dynamite titled The Crossroads. The team of Cody Rhodes and Velvet lost to Jade Cargill and Shaquille O'Neal, with Jade Cargill getting a pinfall. On March 25, it was announced that Velvet signed a full-time contract with All Elite Wrestling. On the May 19 episode of Dynamite, Velvet faced Serena Deeb for the NWA World Women's Championship, which Velvet lost by submission. On August 13. Velvet challenged Britt Baker for the AEW Women's World Championship on the main event of debut show AEW Rampage. Velvet lost by submission. On the November 5 episode of Rampage, Velvet took part in the AEW women's TBS championship tournament where she defeated The Bunny, later losing to Jade Cargill in the second round. On April 8, 2022, on Rampage, Velvet participated in the AEW Owen Hart Cup facing Willow Nightingale in the qualifying round where she won advancing to the next round. On April 13, on Dynamite Velvet became a part of The Baddies stable which included her, Kiera Hogan and Jade Cargill, establishing herself as a heel. On May 20 on Rampage Velvet faced Kris Statlander in the quarter finals of the Owen Hart Cup where she lost. On June 22 it was revealed on Dynamite that Velvet had sustained an injury. Velvet made her return to AEW television on the November 23 episode of Dynamite. During late 2023 Red Velvet made her ROH debut and wrestled on and off in matches in ROH ever since.

On February 10, 2024 tapings of Ring of Honor Red Velvet entered the inaugural ROH Women's World Television Championship tournament where in the first round she defeated Sandra Moone. On the February 24 episode of Ring of Honor Red Velvet defeated Leyla Hirsch in the second round of the ROH Women's World Television Championship tournament to advance. On the March 16, 2024 tapings of ROH during the semifinals of the tournament Red Velvet faced Queen Aminata but was not successful. On April 13, 2024 Red Velvet faced Athena for the ROH Women's World Championship at AEW Battle of the Belts X but was not successful. On July 26, 2024 Red Velvet won the ROH Women's World Television Championship against Billie Starkz at Death Before Dishonor. On December 20 at Final Battle, Velvet successfully defended her title against Leyla Hirsch. In July 2025, Velvet suffered an injury and would be unable to defend her title. As of result, an interim champion was crowned on July 11 at Death Before Dishonor. On the November 19 episode of Collision, Velvet was defeated by interim champion Mercedes Moné in a title unification match to determine the undisputed ROH Women's World Television Champion, ending her record-setting reign at 481 days. On December 5 at Final Battle, Velvet defeated Moné to regain the ROH Women's World Television Championship.

== Personal life ==
Cardona is of Colombian descent. She is the daughter of world flyweight boxing champion Prudencio Cardona, and the niece of world super bantamweight boxing champion Ricardo Cardona. Cardona was previously engaged to fellow professional wrestler Wes Brisco. As of July 2022, she is in a relationship with professional wrestler Chandler Hopkins.

== Filmography ==
=== Television ===
Year	Title	Role	Notes
2021	Rhodes To The Top	Herself	
2024	Hey! (EW)	Herself	1 episode

== Championships and accomplishments ==
- Consejo Mundial de Lucha Libre
  - CMLL Lucha Femenil Naciones 2024
- Fighting Evolution Wrestling
  - FEW Women's Championship (1 time)
- Full Throttle Pro Wrestling
  - FTPW Ladies Championship (1 time)
- Ring of Honor
  - ROH Women's World Television Championship (2 times)
