= Forbidden Door (2023) =

All Elite Wrestling and New Japan Pro-Wrestling pay-per-view event

AEW x NJPW: Forbidden Door
- Promotional poster featuring Bryan Danielson, Kazuchika Okada, Kenny Omega, and Will Ospreay
- Promotion(s): All Elite Wrestling; New Japan Pro-Wrestling
- Date: June 25, 2023
- City: Toronto, Ontario, Canada
- Venue: Scotiabank Arena
- Attendance: 14,826
- Buy rate: 145,000

Event chronology
← Previous; AEW: Double or Nothing; NJPW: All Together: Again	Next → AEW: All In; NJPW: Fantastica Mania Mexico

Forbidden Door chronology
← Previous; 2022	Next → 2024

AEW in Canada chronology
← Previous; First	Next → September to Remember

The 2023 Forbidden Door was a professional wrestling pay-per-view (PPV) event and supershow co-produced by the American promotion All Elite Wrestling (AEW) and the Japan-based New Japan Pro-Wrestling (NJPW). It was the second annual Forbidden Door and took place on June 25, 2023, at the Scotiabank Arena in Toronto, Ontario, Canada. It was AEW's first PPV to be held outside of the United States and NJPW's first traditional PPV to be held in Canada.

Fourteen matches were contested at the event, including four on Zero Hour pre-show as well as one dark match. In the main event, Bryan Danielson defeated Kazuchika Okada by submission. In other prominent matches, Will Ospreay defeated Kenny Omega to win the IWGP United States Heavyweight Championship, The Elite ("Hangman" Adam Page, Matt Jackson, and Nick Jackson), Eddie Kingston, and Tomohiro Ishii defeated Blackpool Combat Club (Jon Moxley, Wheeler Yuta, and Claudio Castagnoli), Konosuke Takeshita, and Shota Umino in a 10-man tag team match, Sanada defeated "Jungle Boy" Jack Perry to retain the IWGP World Heavyweight Championship, and in the opening bout, MJF defeated Hiroshi Tanahashi to retain the AEW World Championship.

== Production ==
=== Background ===
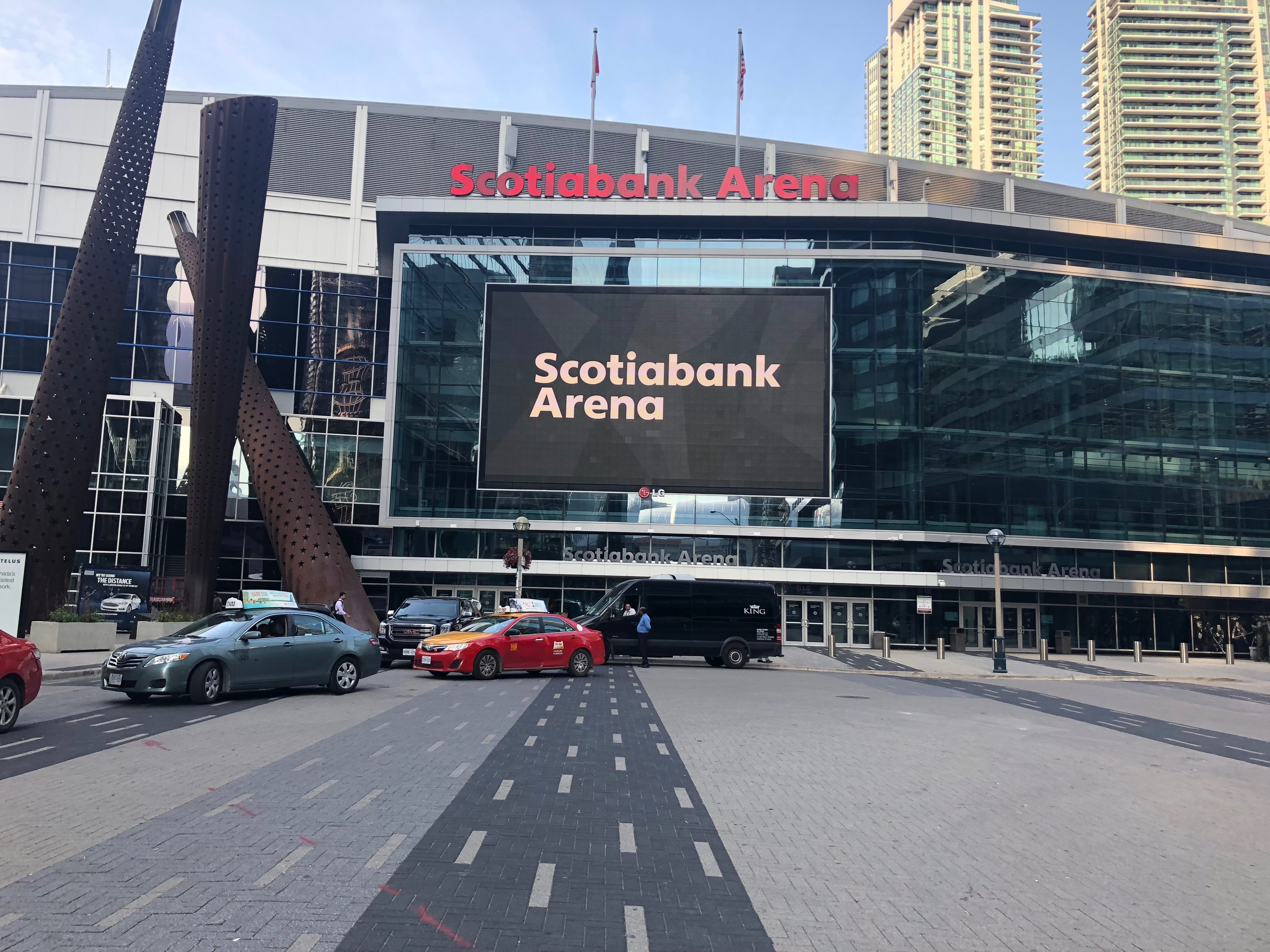
Forbidden Door took place at the Scotiabank Arena in Toronto, Ontario, Canada, marking All Elite Wrestling's first pay-per-view (PPV) event held outside of the United States, and New Japan Pro-Wrestling's first traditional PPV held in Canada.

In February 2021, the American professional wrestling promotion All Elite Wrestling (AEW) started a partnership with the Japanese promotion, New Japan Pro-Wrestling (NJPW). After a year of AEW and NJPW wrestlers appearing on each other's shows, the two companies co-promoted a pay-per-view (PPV) event titled Forbidden Door in June 2022. The event took its name from the same term often used by AEW when referring to working with other professional wrestling promotions.

On March 15, 2023, a second Forbidden Door event between AEW and NJPW was scheduled to be held on June 25, 2023, at the Scotiabank Arena in Toronto, Ontario, Canada, thus establishing Forbidden Door as an annual event between the two companies. Tickets went on sale on March 24. This marked AEW's first PPV held outside of the United States and also kicked off a month-long tour of Canada for AEW, which included their weekly television programs and house shows.

Forbidden Door was also the first Canadian event co-promoted by NJPW to air on traditional PPV outlets. Prior to its acquisition by Tony Khan, sibling promotion Ring of Honor co-promoted two Global Wars events with NJPW in 2014 and 2015; both of which were held in Toronto and aired live on internet pay-per-view (iPPV). This event also marked the first non-WWE pay-per-view event to be held in Toronto since November 21, 1999, when Mayhem, produced by the former World Championship Wrestling (WCW), took place at what was then called the Air Canada Centre.

=== Storylines ===
Forbidden Door featured professional wrestling matches that involved different wrestlers from pre-existing scripted feuds and storylines.

On the April 26 episode of Dynamite, AEW president Tony Khan announced that tournament matches for the second annual Owen Hart Cup would occur at Forbidden Door. On the June 21 episode, the brackets were revealed, with two matches to be held during the PPV: ROH Women's World Champion Athena facing Billie Starkz in the women's tournament during the pre-show and CM Punk facing Satoshi Kojima in the men's tournament, marking Punk's first appearance on an AEW PPV since All Out, where he main evented before being involved in the legitimate backstage fight.

At NJPW's Wrestle Kingdom 17, Kenny Omega defeated Will Ospreay to win the IWGP United States Heavyweight Championship. In April, NJPW announced a tournament to determine the new Number 1 contender to Omega's championship, featuring Ospreay, Lance Archer, Juice Robinson, and Hiroshi Tanahashi. However, on April 16 at NJPW's Capital Collision, Robinson was (kayfabe) suspended from NJPW after attacking both Fred Rosser and a referee during a match against Rosser, which ended in a no contest. Soon after, it was announced that Rosser would replace Robinson in the tournament. On April 16 at Capital Collision, Archer defeated Rosser. On May 21 at NJPW's Resurgence, Ospreay defeated Tanahashi to set up the tournament final, which took place on June 4 at NJPW's Dominion 6.4 in Osaka-jo Hall, where Ospreay defeated Archer to become the number one contender for the US title. On June 6, NJPW held a press conference where the match was made official for Forbidden Door.

At Dominion 6.4 in Osaka-jo Hall, Blackpool Combat Club's (BCC) Jon Moxley and Claudio Castagnoli teamed with Moxley's protege Shota Umino to face Kazuchika Okada, Hiroshi Tanahashi, and Tomohiro Ishii for the NEVER Openweight 6-Man Tag Team Championship, but failed to win the titles. After the match, Moxley took to the microphone, presenting a video package for Okada. The video featured fellow BCC member Bryan Danielson, who challenged Okada to a match. Okada responded by claiming that the "forbidden door" would be open, teasing the match taking place at the PPV. On June 6, NJPW held a press conference where Okada accepted Danielson's challenge for Forbidden Door, making the match official.

Following NJPW's All Together Again on June 9, it was hinted that IWGP World Heavyweight Champion Sanada would have an announcement on a future episode of Dynamite regarding his plans as NJPW's World Champion for the upcoming Forbidden Door PPV. The rumours were proven true on the June 14 episode of Dynamite, where Sanada appeared via a video message issuing an open challenge for his title at the PPV. Later on the show, the offer was accepted by "Jungle Boy" Jack Perry, who asked for his tag team partner Hook to be in his corner for the match. Soon after, the match was made official for Forbidden Door. On the June 23 episode of AEW Rampage, Perry defeated Sanada's Just 5 Guys teammate Douki, using Sanada's finisher to win the match, leading to Sanada confronting Perry in the ring, after the match.

On the June 14 episode of Dynamite, NJPW's Hiroshi Tanahashi challenged AEW World Champion MJF to a title match at Forbidden Door via a video message. The match was made official for the PPV, however, MJF claimed to have no interest in defending the belt against Tanahashi, claiming NJPW to be an inferior company, whilst also hinting no-showing the PPV. Despite this, on the June 21 episode of Dynamite, MJF accepted Tanahashi's challenge after being named a "coward" by Adam Cole.

AEW International Champion Orange Cassidy successfully defended his title at AEW's Double or Nothing, winning the Blackjack Battle Royal. In the post-show press conference, Cassidy was asked who he would like to defend the title against in the future, which he answered by expressing the desire to face NJPW World Television Champion Zack Sabre Jr. Meanwhile, on the June 2 episode of Rampage, Cassidy's ally, Katsuyori Shibata, successfully defeated Lee Moriarty to retain his ROH Pure Championship, although he was confronted by Daniel Garcia, who sought a future title shot. On the June 14 episode of Dynamite, Sabre Jr. confronted Cassidy backstage, looking to arrange a future match, however, they were interrupted by Garcia, who asked Cassidy about Shibata's whereabouts. Cassidy suggested that he and Shibata would team against Garcia and Sabre Jr. the following week, in a tag team match. Garcia and Sabre Jr, defeated Cassidy and Shibata. After the match, all four men held on to the International Championship and a four-way match for the title was scheduled for Forbidden Door.

Following his loss at Double or Nothing, Sammy Guevara returned to Dynamite on June 14, expressing his desire to "make some changes" to himself in AEW. Guevara was interrupted by Darby Allin, who also had lost at Double or Nothing, who went on to suggest that Guevara should not live in the shadows of the Jericho Appreciation Society (JAS). This led to JAS leader Chris Jericho confronting the duo, berating Allin for his suggestion and questioning Guevara's distancing from the JAS and suggesting that he and Guevara should team to reestablish Guevara in the faction. As Jericho hinted at attacking Allin, Sting entered the ring coming face-to-face with Jericho, who soon fled the ring. The following week, after teaming with Guevara and Minoru Suzuki to defeat Darius Martin, Action Andretti, and AR Fox, Jericho called out Sting and Allin, challenging them to find a partner to face himself, Guevara, and Suzuki at Forbidden Door, which Sting and Allin accepted, with Allin stating they had a partner which they would reveal on that week's episode of AEW Collision. At the show, Sting and Allin's partner was revealed to be Jericho's old rival Tetsuya Naito, who made his AEW debut, and a trios match was made official for Forbidden Door.

On the June 14 episode of Dynamite, AEW Women's World Champion, Toni Storm successfully defended her title against Skye Blue. After the match, Storm and teammate Ruby Soho attacked Blue, only for her to be saved by NJPW Strong Women's Champion, Willow Nightingale. On the debut episode of Collision, Nightingale and Blue defeated Storm and Soho, in a tag team match. Soon after, it was announced that Storm would defend her AEW Women's World Championship against Nightingale at Forbidden Door.

On the June 21 episode of Dynamite, it was revealed that rivals MJF and Adam Cole would team up in the Blind Eliminator Tournament in order to determine the number one contender for the AEW World Tag Team Championship, much to both men's dismay. Two days later, MJF made his debut on Rampage, interrupting Cole and informing him that he had arranged Cole a match at Forbidden Door against NJPW's Tom Lawlor. This led to Team Filthy's Lawlor and Royce Isaacs making their AEW debut, attacking Cole, as MJF mockingly teased saving his partner Cole from the assault. On the day of the event, however, it was announced that Cole was not medically cleared to compete due to an illness. The match was moved to dark match for Lawlor against Serpentico before the pre-show. During the post-event media scrum, Tony Khan said Cole's illness appeared to be the flu.

== Event ==
Other on-screen personnel
Role	Name
Commentators	Excalibur (Pre-show and PPV)
Commentators	Kevin Kelly (Pre-show and PPV)
Commentators	Taz (first 4 PPV matches)
Commentators	Tony Schiavone (last 5 matches)
Commentators	Chris Charlton (Pre-show)
Japanese commentators	Haruo Murata
Japanese commentators	Miki Motoi
Japanese commentators	El Desperado
Spanish commentators	Alex Abrahantes
Spanish commentators	Thunder Rosa
Spanish commentators	Angélico
Spanish commentators	Alvaro Riojas
Ring announcer	Justin Roberts
Ring announcer	Takuro Shibata
Ring announcer	Dasha Gonzalez (CM Punk vs. Satoshi Kojima match)
Referees	Aubrey Edwards
Referees	Bryce Remsburg
Referees	Paul Turner
Referees	Rick Knox
Referees	Stephon Smith
Referees	Red Shoes Unno
Pre-show hosts	Renee Paquette
Pre-show hosts	RJ City

=== Zero Hour ===
There were four matches contested on the Zero Hour pre-show, with one taped as a dark match. In the opening contest, Mogul Embassy (Swerve Strickland, Brian Cage, Toa Liona, and Bishop Kaun) (with Prince Nana) faced El Desperado and Chaos (Rocky Romero, Chuck Taylor, and Trent Beretta). In the closing stages, Beretta delivered the Strong Zero on Swerve, but Kaun broke up the pin. As Romero was attempting the Shiranui, Cage and Swerve avoided it and delivered an F-10/DDT combo; Swerve then delivered the Swerve Stomp for the win.

Next, Athena faced Billie Starkz in the Owen Hart Foundation tournament first round match. In the closing stages, as Starkz was attempting a senton on the apron to Athena, Athena evaded the move, allowing Athena to bring Starkz back into the ring and deliver a Dominator to pickup the victory.

In the penultimate match of the Zero Hour, El Phantasmo took on Stu Grayson. In the end, Grayson delivered a Pele Kick and a 450° splash for a two-count. Phantasmo delivered an avalanche hurricanrana and the Thunder Kiss '86 for a two-count. As Grayson was attempting the Skyfall, Phantasmo escaped and delivered the Jodi Flysch S-DDT and the CR II for the win.

In the Zero Hour main event, Los Ingobernables de Japon (Shingo Takagi, Hiromu Takahashi, and Bushi) squared off against United Empire (TJP, Kyle Fletcher, and Jeff Cobb). In the closing stages, Takahashi delivered a superkick and Takagi delivered a Death Valley Driver and a lariat to TJP, but Cobb broke up the pin. Takahashi delivered a dropkick to Cobb on the outside, while Bushi delivered a suicide dive to Fletcher also on the outside, allowing Takagi to deliver the Made in Japan on TJP for the win.

=== Preliminary matches ===
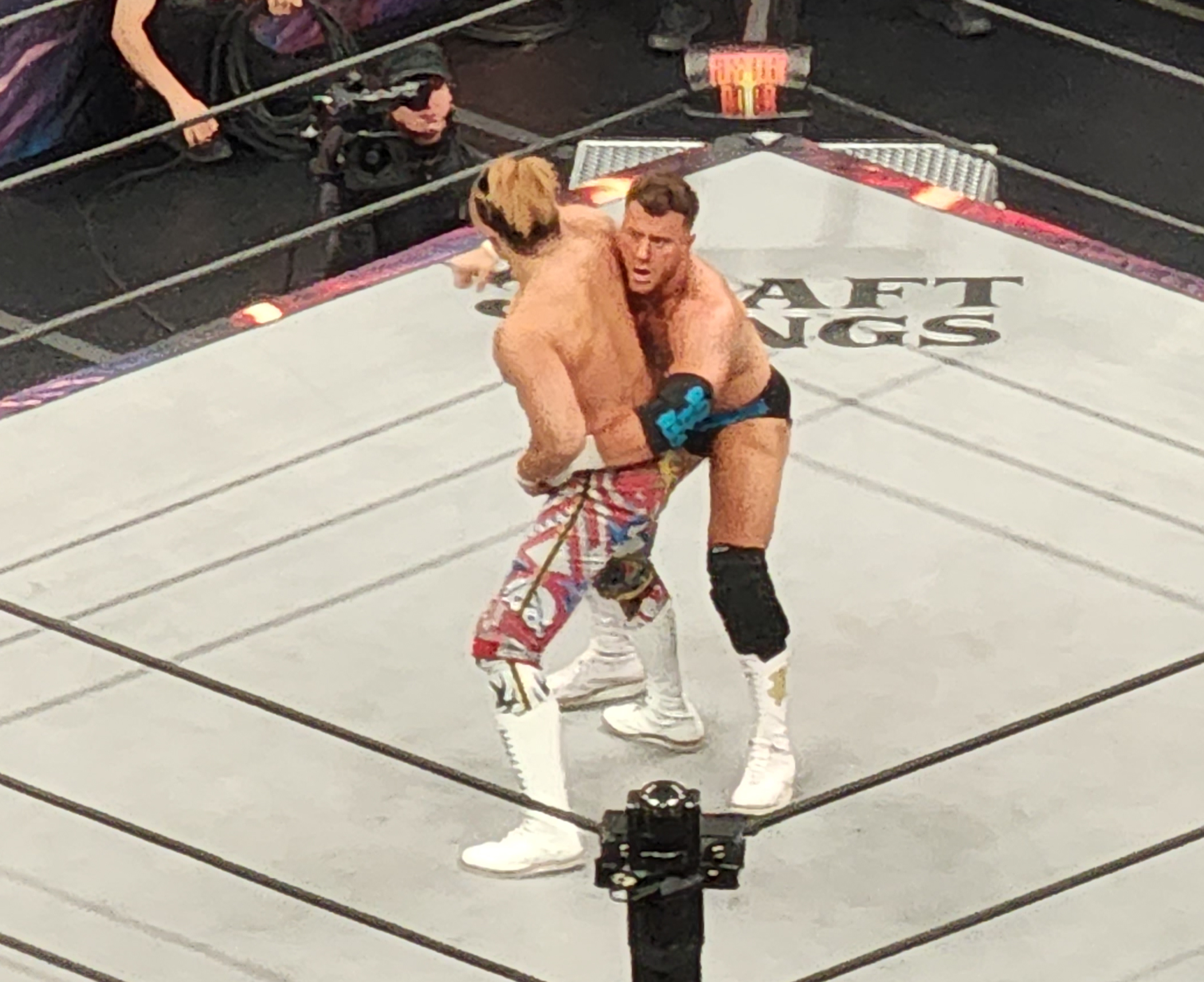
MJF wrestling Hiroshi Tanahashi in the opening bout for the AEW World Championship

In the opening contest, MJF defended the AEW World Championship against Hiroshi Tanahashi. In the opening stages, Tanahashi delivered a flying forearm, a middle-rope senton and a diving crossbody for a two-count. Tanahashi then delivered a sling blade, but as he was attempting the High Fly Flow, MJF prevented it and delivered a double underhook shoulder breaker for a two-count. Tanahashi then locked in the Texas Cloverleaf, but MJF escaped. As Tanahashi was attempting another High Fly Flow, MJF got the knees up. As MJF was attempting to use the title belt on Tanahashi, the referee prevented it and tossed the title away. Tanahashi then delivered a schoolboy to MJF, but the referee was distracted, allowing MJF to hit Tanahashi with the AEW Dynamite Diamond Ring to retain the title.

Next, CM Punk went one-on-one with Satoshi Kojima in the Owen Hart Foundation tournament first round match. In the closing stages, Punk delivered a diving elbow drop for a two-count. Punk then locked in the Anaconda Vice, but Kojima escaped and delivered a clothesline. As Punk was attempting the GTS, Kojima escaped and delivered the Koji Cutter and a brainbuster for a two-count. As Kojima was attempting a lariat, Punk countered it into the GTS for the win.

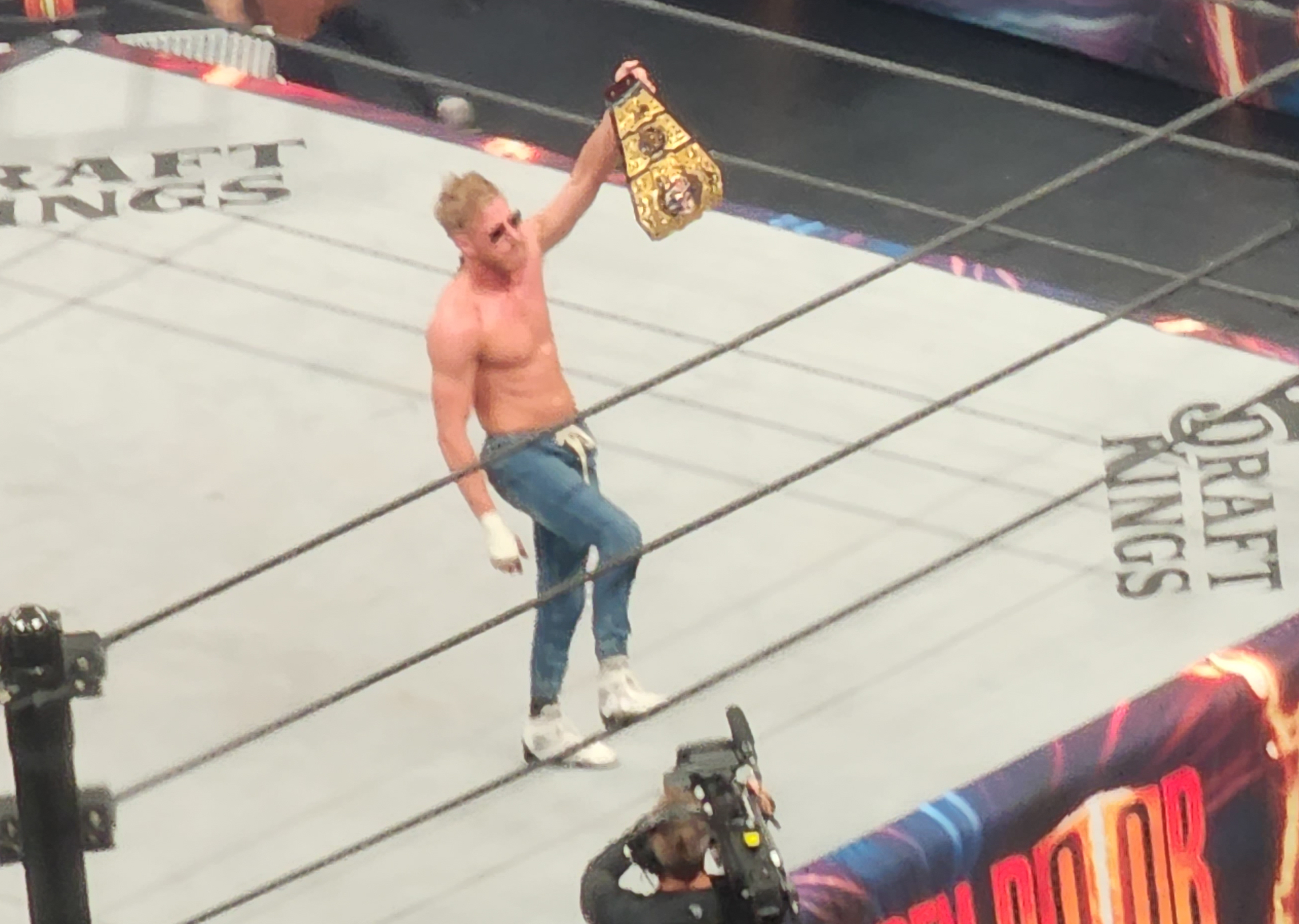
Orange Cassidy with the International Championship.

In the next match, Orange Cassidy defended the AEW International Championship against Daniel Garcia, Katsuyori Shibata and Zack Sabre Jr. In the opening stages, Sabre Jr. locked in an Octopus stretch, but Garcia broke up the submission. Shibata then rolled up Garcia for a two-count. Cassidy then delivered a tornado DDT to Garcia for a two-count. Garcia then hit Shibata with the Pure title belt for another two-count. Shibata then delivered the Kawada Kicks and the Orange Punch to Cassidy, but Sabre Jr. locked in the Ode to Jim on Cassidy, but Garcia broke up the submission. Cassidy then delivered the Stundog Millionaire and the Satellite DDT to Garcia for another two-count. Shibata then locked in the RNC, but Sabre Jr. countered it into a European Clutch. Garcia then delivered a piledriver to Sabre Jr., but Shibata immediately delivered the PK to Garcia, then Cassidy pushed Shibata to the outside and delivered a crucifix pin on Garcia for the win.

In the next bout, Sanada (with Douki) defended the IWGP Heavyweight Championship against "Jungle Boy" Jack Perry (with Hook). In the closing stages, Jungle Boy delivered a superkick and a tiger bomb for a two-count. Jungle Boy then locked in Skull's End, but Sanada reached the ropes and delivered the TKO. As Sanada was attempting the Moonsault, Jungle Boy escaped and delivered a superkick and a poison Rana. Sanada then delivered a Shining Wizard, another Poison Rana and a Moonsault to retain the title. After the match, Jungle Boy launched an attack on Hook, turning heel for the first time in his AEW career.

Next, The Elite ("Hangman" Adam Page, Matt Jackson, and Nick Jackson), Eddie Kingston, and Tomohiro Ishii faced Blackpool Combat Club (Wheeler Yuta, Jon Moxley and Claudio Castagnoli), Konosuke Takeshita, and Shota Umino. In the opening stages, "Hangman" delivered an Orihara moonsault to take out everyone on the outside. Nick Jackson then delivered a double jump escalara to Yuta. Takeshita then locked in a Camel Clutch submission, but Ishii broke up the submission. Kingston then delivered a lariat to Claudio. Claudio then delivered an uppercut and a suplex to Ishii, but Ishii immediately delivered a vertical suplex to Claudio. Takeshita and Umino then delivered a reverse DDT/powerbomb combination to Ishii for a two-count. Takeshita then delivered a Helluva Kick and a diving clothesline to "Hangman". The Young Bucks then delivered an assisted Sliced Bread to Takeshita. As The Bucks were attempting the BTE Trigger, Takeshita moved out of the way and delivered simultaneous German suplexes. The Bucks then delivered superkicks to Umino, Claudio and Takeshita. As The Bucks were attempting to deliver a double superkick to Moxley, The Bucks unintentionally superkicked Kingston. Takeshita then delivered a Blue Thunder Bomb to Matt Jackson for a two-count. Moxley and Claudio then delivered the Hart Attack to Matt. Ishii then delivered a lariat and a superplex to Ishii. Umino then delivered an Angle Slam to Ishii for a two-count. Takeshita then delivered a lariat, but "Hangman" immediately delivered a pop-up powerbomb. Claudio and Moxley then delivered an uppercut/cutter combination to Kingston. Yuta then delivered a belly-to-back suplex to "Hangman", but Ishii delivered a suplex and a sheer drop brainbuster to Yuta for the win.

Next, Toni Storm (with Ruby Soho and Saraya) defended the AEW Women's World Championship against Willow Nightingale. In the closing stages, Willow delivered a hip attack, a superkick and a Death Valley Driver for a two-count. As Storm was attempting the Storm Zero, Willow reversed it into a hurricarana for another two-count. Willow then delivered a lariat and the Pounce. As Willow was attempting the Doctor Bomb, Storm gouged Willow's eyes and delivered the Storm Zero to retain the title.

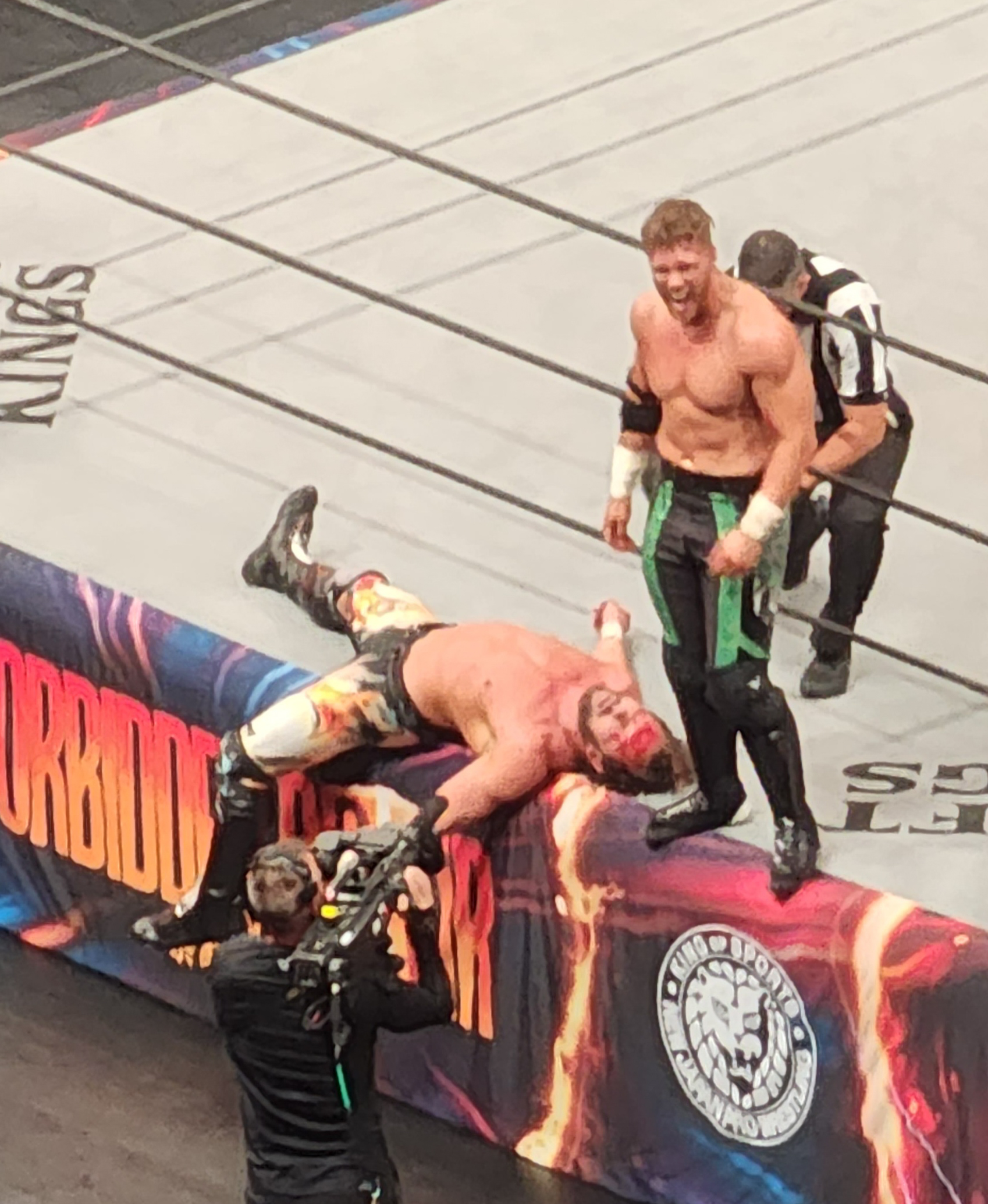
Will Ospreay stands over a bloodied Kenny Omega during their match.

Next, Kenny Omega defended the IWGP United States Heavyweight Championship against Will Ospreay (with Don Callis). In the opening stages, as Omega was attempting a snap suplex, Ospreay countered it into a backbreaker for a two-count. Omega then delivered a hurricarana and a moonsault for a two-count. Ospreay then delivered a standing shooting star press and an OsCutter on the apron. Ospreay then delivered the Hidden Blade on the outside. Ospreay then carried the Canadian Flag to wipe his behind. Omega then delivered a clothesline and a V-Trigger to the barricade. Omega then delivered a DDT on the steel steps to Ospreay. Ospreay then delivered a German suplex and Spanish Fly for a two-count. As Ospreay was attempting the OsCutter, Omega countered it into a mid-air knee strike. Omega then delivered a piledriver for a two-count. Ospreay then delivered a Sky Twister Press, a Liger Bomb and an avalanche OsCutter for another two-count. Omega then delivered two V-Triggers, but as he was attempting the One-Winged Angel, Don Callis threw a screwdriver to Ospreay and Ospreay spiked Omega's head with it. Omega then delivered the Storm Breaker, but Omega's feet reached the ropes. Ospreay then delivered a brainbuster and a One-Winged Angel for a one-count. Ospreay then delivered a Tiger Driver '91, the Hidden Blade and a Storm Breaker to win the IWGP United States Championship.

In the penultimate match, Le Suzuki Gods (Chris Jericho, Sammy Guevara and Minoru Suzuki) battled Sting, Darby Allin and Tetsuya Naito. In the closing stages, as Jericho was attempting the Stinger Splash, Sting countered it into the Scorpion Deathlock, but Guevara broke up the submission with a diving cutter. Guevara then delivered an avalanche Spanish Fly to Darby for a two-count. Jericho then delivered a Judas Effect to Darby, but Naito then delivered a swinging neckbreaker to Jericho. Guevara then delivered a 630° senton to Sting through the table. As Darby was attempting the Coffin Drop, Suzuki countered it into a sleeper hold, but Darby then reversed it into a pin for a two-count. As Suzuki was attempting the Gotch piledriver, Naito blocked it, but Jericho delivered a Codebreaker to Naito for a two-count. Naito then delivered a lariat and a jackknife pin to Suzuki for the win.

=== Main event ===
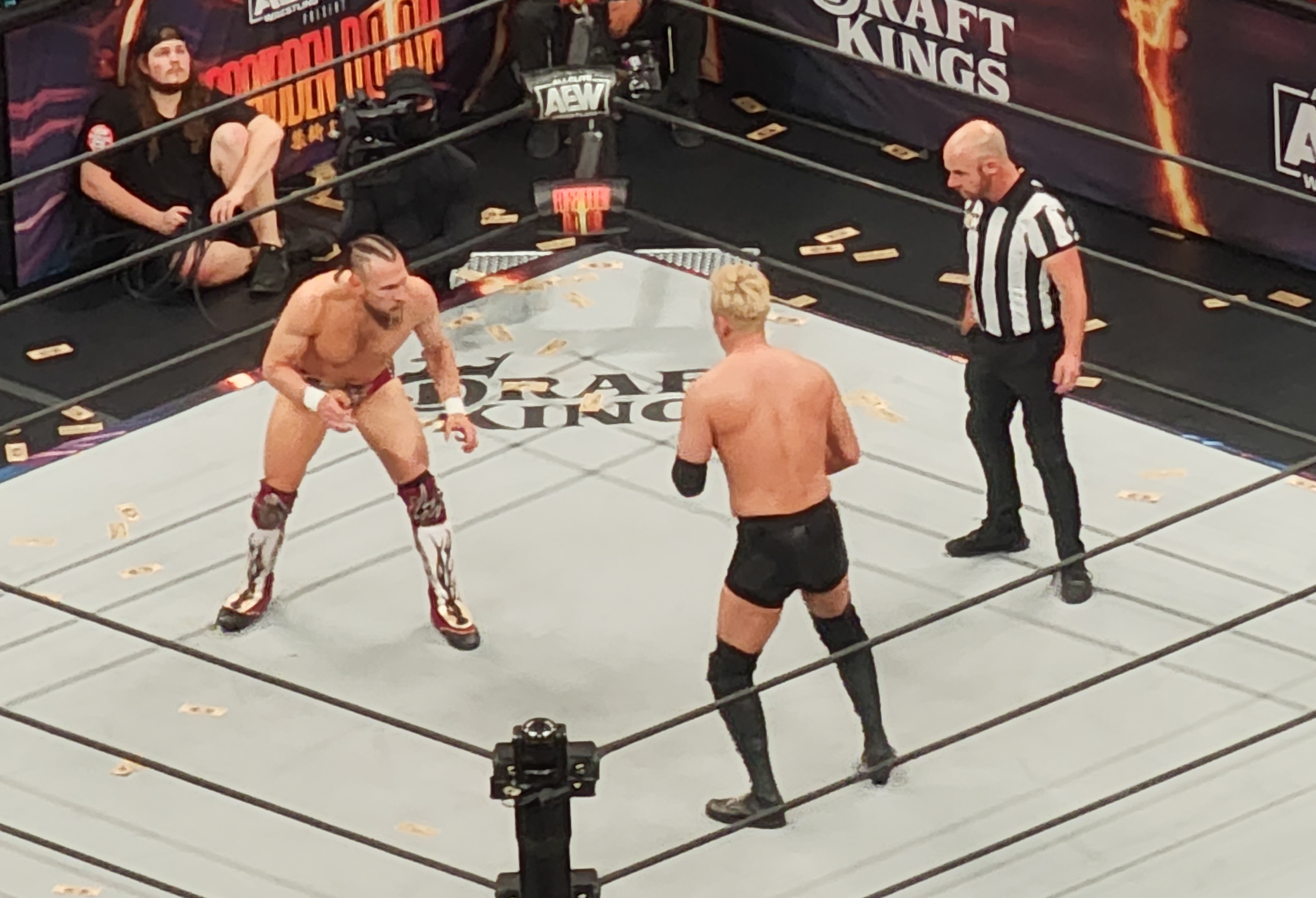
Danielson and Okada wrestling in the main event

In the main event, Bryan Danielson faced Kazuchika Okada. In the opening stages, Okada delivered a sliding dropkick and a big boot, but Danielson then delivered a diving knee strike from the apron to the outside. Okada then delivered a flapjack, a DDT and an Air Raid Crash neckbreaker for a two-count. Danielson then locked in the Cattle Mutilation, but Okada escaped the submission attempt. Danielson then delivered Hammer and Anvil elbow strikes and a shotgun dropkick. As Okada was attempting the Rainmaker, Danielson escaped it into a dropkick. Danielson then locked in the LeBell lock, but Okada reached the ropes. Danielson then delivered a Penalty Kick and a Busaiku Knee to Okada on the outside. Okada then delivered a tombstone piledriver on the ramp to Danielson. As Okada was attempting the Rainmaker, Danielson dodged it into the Busaiku Knee. Danielson then delivered a roundhouse kick, but Okada immediately delivered a Michinoku Driver and the Rainmaker for a two-count. Okada then delivered a diving elbow drop onto Danielson's arm, legitimately fracturing it. Danielson then delivered the Busaiku Knee, but Okada responded with a dropkick. Danielson then delivered an omoplata into the LeBell lock, forcing Okada to tap out.

== Reception ==
The event received widespread acclaim, particularly for the IWGP U.S. Championship match between Kenny Omega and Will Ospreay with many hailing it as one of the best wrestling matches of all time. Critics also praised the International Championship match, the 10-man tag team match, and the main event between Danielson and Okada.

Wrestling journalist Dave Meltzer of the Wrestling Observer Newsletter rated the AEW World Championship and the AEW Women's World Championship bout both 3.25 stars; the International Championship match and the Punk-Kojima match both 4 stars; the IWGP World Championship match 3.75 stars, the 10-man tag team match and the main event 4.75 stars, the IWGP US Championship match 6 stars (the highest rated match on the card) and the Le Suzuki Gods-Sting, Allin and Naito match 3 stars (the lowest rated match on the card).

== Results ==
No.	Results	Stipulations	Times
1^{D}	Tom Lawlor (with Royce Isaacs) defeated Serpentico (with Luther) by pinfall (Note: Serpentico was a replacement for Adam Cole, who fell ill and was not medically cleared to participate. As a result, this match became a dark match instead of being in the main card.)	Singles match	4:10
2^{P}	Mogul Embassy (Swerve Strickland, Toa Liona, Brian Cage, and Bishop Kaun) (with Prince Nana) defeated Chaos (Rocky Romero, Chuck Taylor, and Trent Beretta) and El Desperado by pinfall	Eight-man tag team match	12:30
3^{P}	Athena defeated Billie Starkz by pinfall	Women's Owen Hart Cup Tournament First Round match	7:50
4^{P}	El Phantasmo defeated Stu Grayson by pinfall	Singles match	7:15
5^{P}	Los Ingobernables de Japon (Shingo Takagi, Bushi, and Hiromu Takahashi) defeated United Empire (Jeff Cobb, Kyle Fletcher, and TJP) by pinfall	Trios match	7:30
6	MJF (c) defeated Hiroshi Tanahashi by pinfall	Singles match for the AEW World Championship	15:30
7	CM Punk defeated Satoshi Kojima by pinfall	Men's Owen Hart Cup Tournament First Round match	13:40
8	Orange Cassidy (c) defeated Zack Sabre Jr., Katsuyori Shibata, and Daniel Garcia by pinfall	Four-way match for the AEW International Championship	11:15
9	Sanada (c) (with Douki) defeated "Jungle Boy" Jack Perry (with Hook) by pinfall	Singles match for the IWGP World Heavyweight Championship	10:45
10	The Elite ("Hangman" Adam Page, Matt Jackson, and Nick Jackson), Eddie Kingston, and Tomohiro Ishii defeated Blackpool Combat Club (Jon Moxley, Wheeler Yuta, and Claudio Castagnoli), Konosuke Takeshita, and Shota Umino by pinfall	10-man tag team match	21:25
11	Toni Storm (c) (with Ruby Soho and Saraya) defeated Willow Nightingale by pinfall	Singles match for the AEW Women's World Championship	10:30
12	Will Ospreay (with Don Callis) defeated Kenny Omega (c) by pinfall	Singles match for the IWGP United States Heavyweight Championship	39:45
13	Sting, Darby Allin, and Tetsuya Naito defeated Le Suzuki Gods (Chris Jericho, Sammy Guevara, and Minoru Suzuki) by pinfall	Trios match	15:10
14	Bryan Danielson defeated Kazuchika Okada by submission	Singles match	27:40
(c) / – the champion(s) heading into the match; D / – this was a dark match; P / – the match was broadcast on the pre-show

=== IWGP United States Heavyweight Championship #1 contender tournament ===
First Round; Collision in Philadelphia (April 16); Resurgence (May 21)
Lance Archer	Pin
Fred Rosser (Note: Juice Robinson was originally scheduled to face Archer in the first round but was suspended due to attacking Rosser before their match at Capital Collision, as a result Robinson was replaced by Rosser.)	14:22
Will Ospreay	Pin
Hiroshi Tanahashi	16:44

Final; Dominion 6.4 in Osaka-jo Hall (June 4)
Lance Archer	8:01
Will Ospreay	Pin

== See also ==
- 2023 in professional wrestling
- List of All Elite Wrestling pay-per-view events
- List of major NJPW events
