= Forbidden Door (2026) =

All Elite Wrestling pay-per-view and livestreaming event

- Promotional poster featuring various AEW wrestlers
- Promotion(s): All Elite Wrestling; New Japan Pro-Wrestling; Consejo Mundial de Lucha Libre; World Wonder Ring Stardom
- Date: June 28, 2026
- City: San Jose, California
- Venue: SAP Center
- Attendance: 9,082
- Buy rate: 135,000

Pay-per-view chronology
← Previous; AEW; Double or Nothing; NJPW and CMLL; Fantastica Mania Mexico; Stardom; Global Wars Cincinnati	Next → AEW; Redemption; NJPW; G1 Climax 36; CMLL; Grand Slam Mexico; Stardom; The Conversion

Forbidden Door chronology
← Previous; 2025	Next → 2027

The 2026 Forbidden Door was a professional wrestling pay-per-view (PPV) event co-produced by All Elite Wrestling (AEW), New Japan Pro-Wrestling (NJPW), Consejo Mundial de Lucha Libre (CMLL), and World Wonder Ring Stardom. It was the fifth annual Forbidden Door, and the first to be officially co-promoted by CMLL and Stardom. The event took place on June 28, 2026, at the SAP Center in San Jose, California. For the first time, Forbidden Door featured the finals of the men's and women's Owen Hart Foundation Tournament, becoming the third overall AEW PPV to play host to them. The event went head-to-head with The Great American Bash, a livestreaming event and television special produced by WWE for its NXT brand.

Twelve matches took place on the card, including three on the Zero-Hour pre-show. In the event's final match, which was promoted as part of a triple main event, Will Ospreay defeated Swerve Strickland to win the Men's Owen Hart Foundation Cup Tournament. The second main event, which was the penultimate match, saw Team Briscoe (Mark Briscoe, Orange Cassidy, Roderick Strong, Kyle O'Reilly, Konosuke Takeshita, and Darby Allin) defeat Team DCMJF (MJF, Kevin Knight, Kyle Fletcher, Jake Doyle, Kazuchika Okada, and Andrade El Ídolo) in Death's Door, and in the first main event, Mercedes Moné defeated Maya World to win the Women's Owen Hart Foundation Cup Tournament for the second consecutive year, making her the first wrestler—male or female—to win the tournament twice and back-to-back. In other prominent matches, Kenny Omega defeated Zack Sabre Jr., Jon Moxley defeated Bandido to retain the AEW Continental Championship, and Shota Umino defeated Pac to retain the IWGP Global Heavyweight Championship. The event was also notable for the return of Jay White, who had been out with an injury since April 2025.

== Production ==
=== Background ===
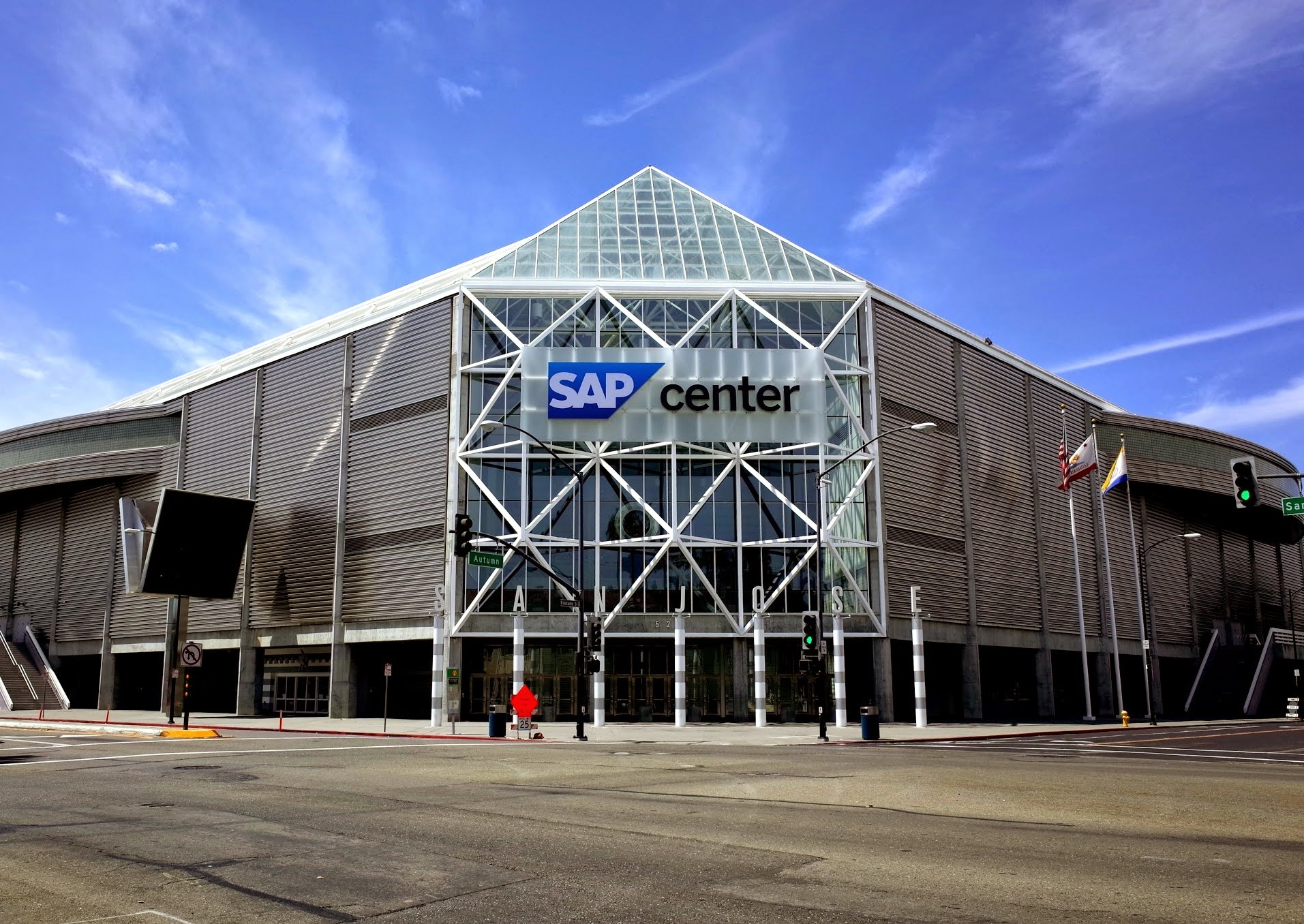
The 2026 Forbidden Door took place at the SAP Center in San Jose, California.

Forbidden Door is an annual professional wrestling pay-per-view (PPV) event originally co-produced by the American promotion All Elite Wrestling (AEW) and Japan-based New Japan Pro-Wrestling (NJPW). Established in 2022, the event is held during the northern hemisphere summer, typically in June, and features direct competition between wrestlers from the two companies. After the Mexican promotion Consejo Mundial de Lucha Libre (CMLL) and NJPW's sister brand, the Japanese women's promotion World Wonder Ring Stardom, were involved in the 2024 and 2025 events, AEW president Tony Khan revealed that both CMLL and Stardom would be official co-promoters for 2026.

On April 15, 2026, it was revealed that the 2026 Forbidden Door would take place on June 28 at the SAP Center in San Jose, California. Tickets for the event went on sale April 27. Forbidden Door went head-to-head with The Great American Bash, a livestreaming event and television special produced by rival company WWE for its developmental brand, NXT. It was also set to go head-to-head with Slammiversary, a PPV event by another rival company, Total Nonstop Action Wrestling (TNA); however, TNA moved Slammiversary to an earlier start time to avoid counter-programming. Wrestling journalist Dave Meltzer questioned WWE's counter-programming strategy as they had previously aired both main roster and NXT shows against a number of AEW pay-per-view events in 2025, during which AEW's shows performed better than expected and the WWE shows underperformed.

=== Broadcast ===
Forbidden Door aired via PPV through traditional cable and satellite providers. In the United States, AEW PPV events are available on HBO Max at an exclusive rate for subscribers. The event was also available in the United States and internationally on Prime Video, PPV.com, and YouTube. Additionally in the United States, the show was broadcast at Dave & Buster's and Tom's Watch Bar locations. Outside of the United States and Canada, the event was available to stream on MyAEW.

=== Storylines ===
Other on-screen personnel
Role	Name
Commentators	Excalibur (Pre-show and PPV)
Commentators	Walker Stewart (Pre-show and PPV)
Commentators	Nigel McGuinness (Pre-show and PPV)
Commentators	Tony Schiavone (PPV)
Commentators	Don Callis (Death's Door match)
Spanish Commentators	Carlos Cabrera
Spanish Commentators	Alvaro Riojas
Spanish Commentators	Ariel Levy
Ring announcers	Justin Roberts (PPV)
Ring announcers	Arkady Aura (Pre-show and PPV)
Ring announcers	Takuro Shibata (Pre-show and PPV)
Referees	Aubrey Edwards
Referees	Brandon Martinez
Referees	Bryce Remsburg
Referees	Mike Posey
Referees	Paul Turner
Referees	Rick Knox
Referees	Stephon Smith
Interviewer	Lexy Nair
Pre-show hosts	Renee Paquette
Pre-show hosts	Jeff Jarrett

Forbidden Door featured 12 professional wrestling matches, including three on the Zero Hour pre-show, that involved different wrestlers from pre-existing feuds and storylines. Storylines were produced on AEW's weekly television programs, Dynamite and Collision, as well as shows produced by NJPW, CMLL, and Stardom.

On May 14, 2026, it was confirmed that Forbidden Door would once again host the finals of the annual Owen Hart Cup, where the winners of the respective men's and women's tournaments would earn a match for the AEW World Championship and AEW Women's World Championship, respectively, at AEW's flagship PPV event, All In, on August 30. On the June 3 episode of Dynamite, Will Ospreay advanced to the finals of the men's tournament, with Swerve Strickland advancing to the finals on the following week's episode. On the June 17 episode of Dynamite, 2025 women's tournament winner Mercedes Moné advanced to the finals, with Maya World advancing to the finals on the June 20 episode of Collision.

On June 10 at Dynamite: Summer BlockBuster, NJPW wrestler Zack Sabre Jr. challenged AEW wrestler Kenny Omega to a match at Forbidden Door, expressing that he had yet to defeat him in the United States, questioning if Omega was still "the best". Omega accepted the challenge.

During Collision: Summer BlockBuster on June 13, AEW Women's World Champion Thekla called out Stardom's roster, a promotion she previously wrestled at before AEW. Former Wonder of Stardom Champion Starlight Kid accepted Thekla's challenge for the AEW Women's World Championship at Forbidden Door.

Following MJF's AEW World Championship victory over Darby Allin at Double or Nothing on May 24, Mark Briscoe challenged MJF for the title on the following episode of Dynamite, to which MJF refused due to Briscoe's appearance, and instead accepted a challenge by Rush. The following episode, MJF retained his title against Rush, but suffered a legitimate injury to his knee. On June 10 at Dynamite: Summer Blockbuster, Briscoe spoke to AEW president Tony Khan about an idea he had. Following Briscoe's victory, MJF appeared, declined Briscoe's challenge, and ordered Lethal Twist to attack Briscoe, but was rescued by the Conglomeration. Following the altercation, Briscoe announced that Khan approved a match for Forbidden Door's main event, set to be a six-on-six steel cage match between MJF's team and Briscoe's team, where if Briscoe's team won, Briscoe would receive a world title match. MJF then announced his team to include Don Callis Family (Kevin Knight, Kyle Fletcher, Jake Doyle, Kazuchika Okada, and Andrade El Idolo). Mark Briscoe announced his team on the same night, consisting of Orange Cassidy, Roderick Strong, Kyle O'Reilly, Konosuke Takeshita, and Darby Allin.

== Results ==
No.	Results	Stipulations	Times
1^{P}	Drilla Moloney defeated Daniel Garcia by pinfall	Singles match	10:26
2^{P}	Maika defeated Skye Blue by pinfall	TBS Championship Survival of the Fittest Qualifying Match	9:18
3^{P}	Divine Dominion (Megan Bayne and Lena Kross) (c) defeated Thunder Rosa and Olympia by pinfall	Tag team match for the AEW Women's World Tag Team Championship	10:48
4	The Young Bucks (Matt Jackson and Nick Jackson) defeated El Sky Team (Místico and Máscara Dorada) and Unbound Co. (Shingo Takagi and Titán) by pinfall	Three-way tag team match	17:50
5	Kenny Omega defeated Zack Sabre Jr. by pinfall	Singles match	26:30
6	Jon Moxley (c) defeated Bandido by technical submission	Singles match for the AEW Continental Championship	18:10
7	Shota Umino (c) defeated Pac by pinfall	Singles match for the IWGP Global Heavyweight Championship	18:15
8	Thekla (c) defeated Starlight Kid by pinfall	Singles match for the AEW Women's World Championship	18:45
9	Cope and Cage (Adam Copeland and Christian Cage) (c) defeated The Dogs (David Finlay and Clark Connors) by pinfall	Tag team match for the AEW World Tag Team Championship	16:45
10	Mercedes Moné defeated Maya World by submission	Women's Owen Hart Cup Final; The winner received an AEW Women's World Championship match at All In.	24:55
11	Team Briscoe (Mark Briscoe, Orange Cassidy, Roderick Strong, Kyle O'Reilly, Konosuke Takeshita, and Darby Allin) defeated Team DCMJF (MJF, Kevin Knight, Kyle Fletcher, Jake Doyle, Kazuchika Okada, and Andrade El Ídolo) by pinfall	Death's Door match Since Briscoe's team won, he earned an AEW World Championship match against MJF.	30:50
12	Will Ospreay defeated Swerve Strickland (with Prince Nana) by pinfall	Men's Owen Hart Cup Final; The winner received an AEW World Championship match at All In.	35:30
(c) / – the champion(s) heading into the match; P / – the match was broadcast on the pre-show

=== Owen Hart Cup brackets ===
==== Women's ====
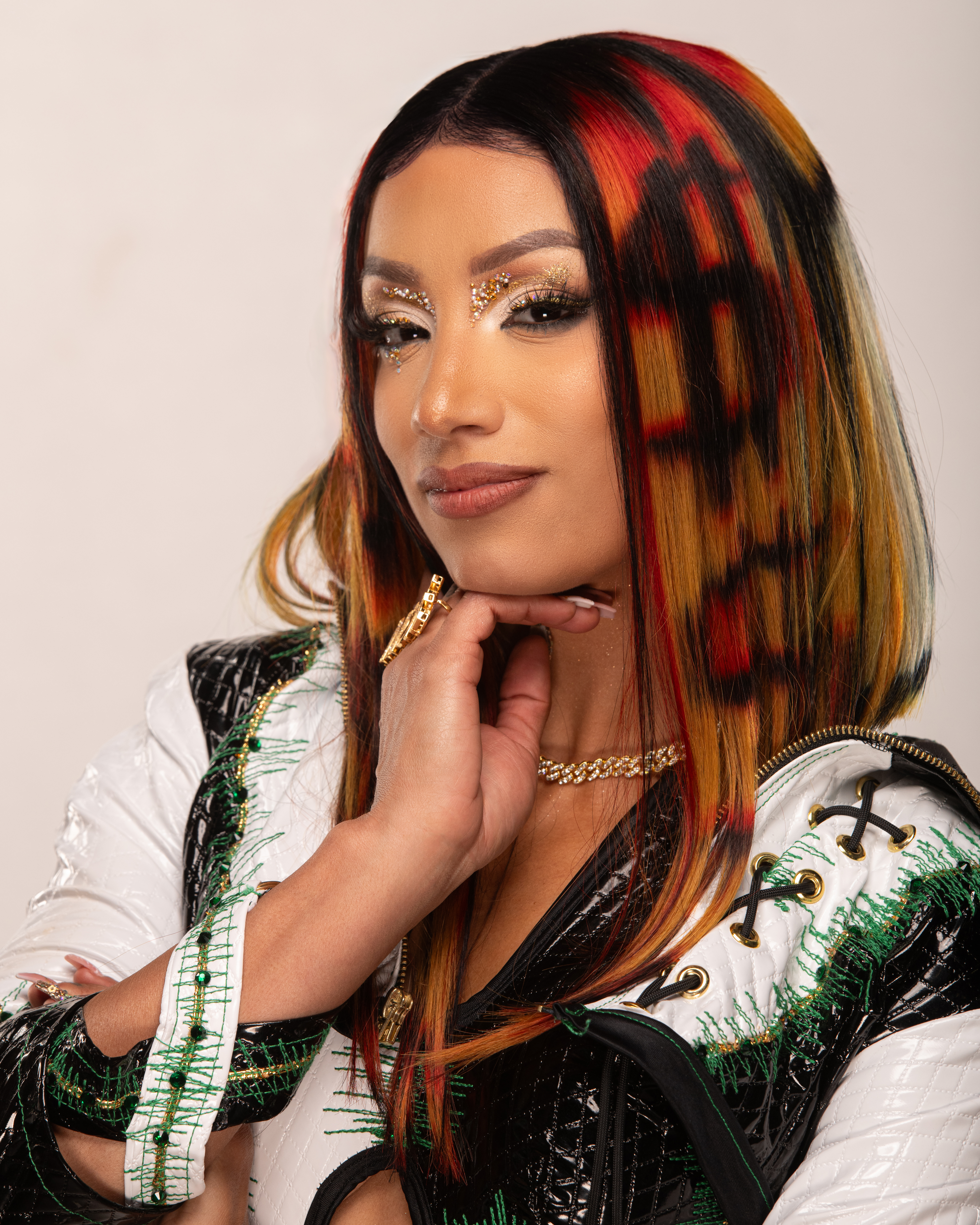
2026 Women's Tournament winner Mercedes Moné, who became the first multi-time Owen Hart Cup champion.

Quarterfinals; Double or Nothing (May 24, 2026); Dynamite (June 3, 2026); Collision (June 6, 2026); Dynamite: Summer Blockbuster (June 10, 2026)
Persephone	12:21
Hazuki	Pin
Mercedes Moné (Note: Willow Nightingale was originally scheduled to face Alex Windsor, but was removed from the match due to injury, thus Windsor would instead face a mystery "Wild Card" participant, later revealed to be Moné.)	Sub
Alex Windsor	12:23
Mina Shirakawa	11:00
Athena	Pin
Skye Blue	11:21
Maya World (Note: Sareee was originally scheduled to face Skye Blue, but was removed from the match due to injury and was replaced by World.)	Pin

Semifinals; Dynamite (June 17, 2026); Collision (June 20, 2026)
Hazuki	22:30
Mercedes Moné	Sub
Athena	14:00
Maya World	Pin

Final; Forbidden Door (June 28, 2026)
Mercedes Moné	Sub
Maya World	24:55

==== Men's ====
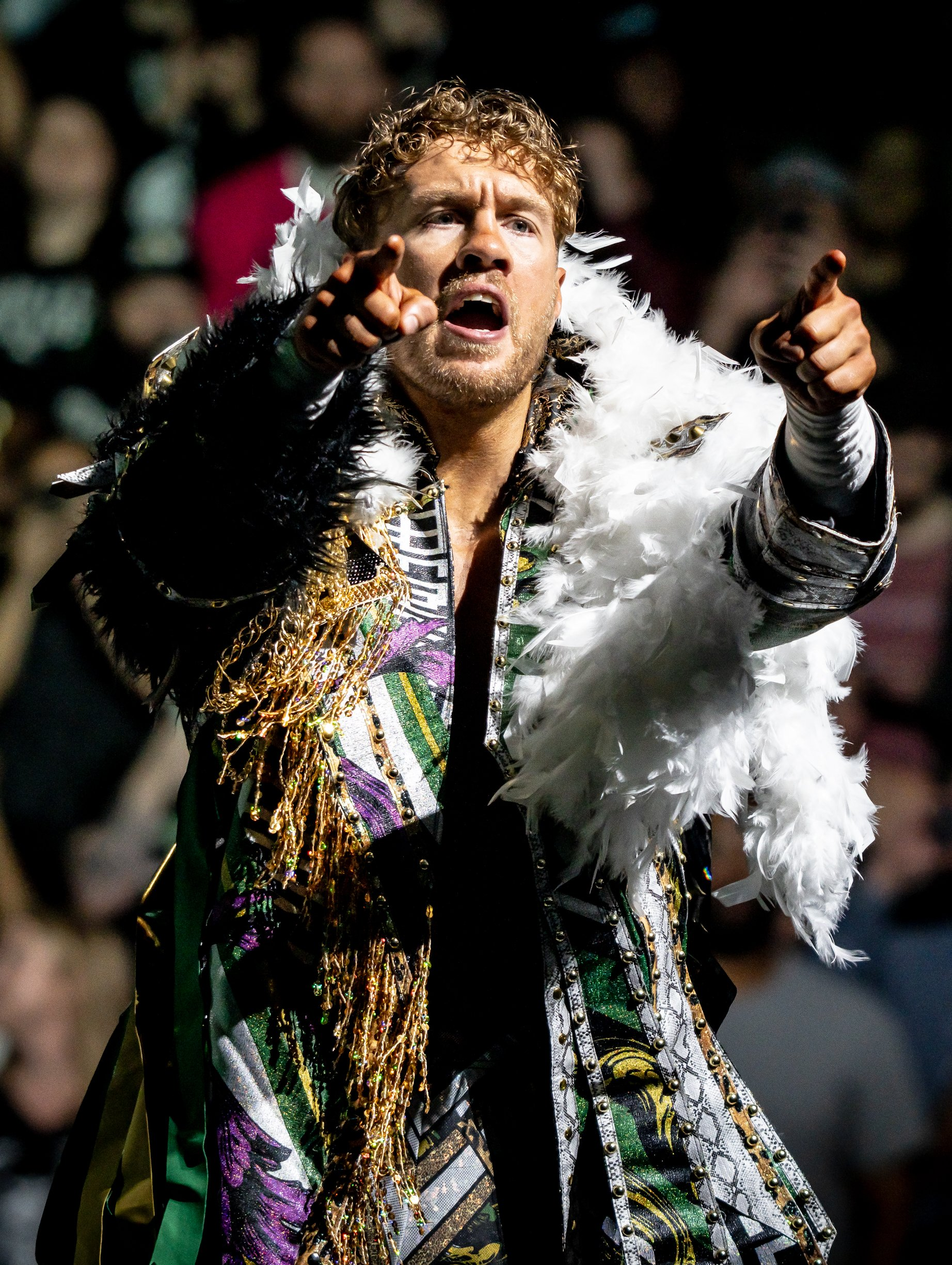
2026 Men's Tournament winner Will Ospreay

Quarterfinals; Double or Nothing (May 24, 2026); Dynamite (May 27, 2026)
Will Ospreay	Pin
Samoa Joe	13:55
Mark Davis	Pin
Jack Perry	17:24
Swerve Strickland	Pin
Bandido	15:20
Claudio Castagnoli	12:01
Brody King	Pin

Semifinals; Dynamite (June 3, 2026); Dynamite: Summer Blockbuster (June 10, 2026)
Will Ospreay	Sub
Mark Davis	23:16
Swerve Strickland	Pin
Brody King	15:00

Final; Forbidden Door (June 28, 2026)
Will Ospreay	Pin
Swerve Strickland	35:30
