= Forbidden Door =

- Forbidden Door logo used from 2022 to 2025 when it was only officially co-promoted between AEW and NJPW
- Promotions: All Elite Wrestling (2022–present); New Japan Pro-Wrestling (2022–present); Consejo Mundial de Lucha Libre (2026–present); World Wonder Ring Stardom (2026–present)
- First event: 2022
- Event gimmick: Cross promotion competition

Forbidden Door is a professional wrestling pay-per-view (PPV) event co-promoted by the American promotion All Elite Wrestling (AEW), the Japanese promotions New Japan Pro-Wrestling (NJPW) and World Wonder Ring Stardom, and the Mexican promotion Consejo Mundial de Lucha Libre (CMLL). Established in 2022, it is generally held annually in June, although it was held in August in 2025. The event features direct competition between wrestlers from the promotions involved, and its name came from a term that had often been used by AEW in its early years when working with other professional wrestling companies.

The event was originally only co-promoted between AEW and NJPW. After CMLL and Stardom were featured at the 2024 and 2025 events, both became official co-sponsors in 2026. The 2025 event was the first to take place outside of North America as it was held in London, England and broke the attendance record for a professional wrestling event at The O2 Arena.

== History ==
In February 2021, the American professional wrestling promotion All Elite Wrestling (AEW) started a partnership with the Japanese promotion, New Japan Pro-Wrestling (NJPW). Since then, both AEW and NJPW had their wrestlers appear on each other's shows in the United States. On April 15, 2022, it was reported that a planned co-promoted event held by the two promotions was in the works.

On the April 20, 2022, episode of AEW Dynamite, AEW president Tony Khan introduced NJPW president Takami Ohbari to make a major announcement regarding their respective companies. They were interrupted by AEW wrestler Adam Cole, who officially announced that a co-promoted pay-per-view (PPV) event titled Forbidden Door would be held on June 26, 2022, at the United Center in Chicago, Illinois. The event took its name from the same term that had often been used by AEW when referring to working with other professional wrestling promotions.

On March 15, 2023, a second Forbidden Door event between AEW and NJPW was scheduled to be held on June 25, 2023, at the Scotiabank Arena in Toronto, Ontario, Canada, thus establishing Forbidden Door as an annual event between the two companies. The event also marked AEW's first PPV held outside of the United States and NJPW's first PPV held in Canada.

On April 11, 2024, the third Forbidden Door was announced to take place on June 30, 2024, at the UBS Arena in the Long Island hamlet of Elmont, New York. This marked the first Forbidden Door event to see involvement from World Wonder Ring Stardom, a women's Japanese promotion purchased by NJPW around that time, as well as Mexico's Consejo Mundial de Lucha Libre (CMLL), a partner promotion to both AEW and NJPW.

In August 2024, advertisements outside Wembley Stadium in London, England were shown days before AEW's All In event, which was held at the venue, advertising that the 2025 Forbidden Door would emanate from London. During All In's Zero Hour pre-show, the 2025 Forbidden Door event was confirmed to be held in London on August 24, 2025. This marked the first Forbidden Door event held outside of North America, and AEW's fifth event overall outside the continent. On April 15, 2025, the venue was confirmed as The O2 Arena.

After CMLL and Stardom's involvement in the 2024 and 2025 events, AEW president Tony Khan revealed that both CMLL and Stardom would be official co-promoters for the 2026 event.

== Events ==
#	Event	Date	City	Venue	Main event	Ref.
1	Forbidden Door (2022)	June 26, 2022	Chicago, Illinois	United Center	Jon Moxley vs. Hiroshi Tanahashi for the interim AEW World Championship	
2	Forbidden Door (2023)	June 25, 2023	Toronto, Ontario, Canada	Scotiabank Arena	Bryan Danielson vs. Kazuchika Okada	
3	Forbidden Door (2024)	June 30, 2024	Elmont, New York	UBS Arena	Swerve Strickland (c) vs. Will Ospreay for the AEW World Championship	
4	Forbidden Door (2025)	August 24, 2025	London, England	The O2 Arena	Golden Lovers (Kenny Omega and Kota Ibushi), Darby Allin, Hiroshi Tanahashi, and Will Ospreay vs. Death Riders (Claudio Castagnoli and Jon Moxley), The Young Bucks (Matt Jackson and Nick Jackson), and Gabe Kidd in a Lights Out Steel Cage match	
5	Forbidden Door (2026)	June 28, 2026	San Jose, California	SAP Center	Will Ospreay vs. Swerve Strickland in the Men's Owen Hart Foundation Tournament Final for an AEW World Championship match at All In	
(c) – refers to the champion(s) heading into the match

== See also ==
- List of All Elite Wrestling pay-per-view events
- List of major NJPW events
- AEW All In
- Wrestle Dynasty, another show co-promoted by AEW and NJPW
