= Owen Hart Cup =

Professional wrestling tournament hosted by All Elite Wrestling

- Official poster/logo of the tournament
- Promotion: All Elite Wrestling
- Other name: Owen Hart Foundation Tournament

Men's
- Established: 2022; 4 years ago
- Current winner: Will Ospreay
- Last completed: 2026
- Prize: AEW World Championship match at All In
- Editions: 5
- Format: Single-elimination tournament
- Participants: 8
Statistics
- First winner: Adam Cole
- Oldest winner: Bryan Danielson (43 years, 49 days)
- Youngest winner: Adam Cole (32 years, 328 days)
- Heaviest winner: "Hangman" Adam Page (229 lb (104 kg))
- Lightest winner: Adam Cole (200 lb (91 kg))

Women's
- Established: 2022; 4 years ago
- Current winner: Mercedes Moné
- Last completed: 2026
- Prize: AEW Women's World Championship match at All In
- Editions: 5
- Format: Single-elimination tournament
- Participants: 8
Statistics
- First winner: Dr. Britt Baker, D.M.D.
- Most wins: Mercedes Moné (2 wins)
- Oldest winner: Mercedes Moné (34 years, 153 days)
- Youngest winner: Mariah May (25 years, 341 days)

The Owen Hart Foundation Tournament, otherwise known as the Owen Hart Cup, is a series of professional wrestling tournaments produced annually by the American promotion All Elite Wrestling (AEW) in partnership with The Owen Hart Foundation. It consists of two single-elimination tournaments, one each for men and women, and the respective winners receive a trophy called "The Owen" as well as a commemorative championship belt. Beginning in 2024, Owen Hart Cup winners also earn matches for AEW's men's and women's world championships at All In, AEW's biggest pay-per-view event of the year.

Established in September 2021, the inaugural tournaments concluded at the Double or Nothing pay-per-view in May 2022 where Adam Cole and Dr. Britt Baker, D.M.D. were the respective men's and women's winners. It is named in honor of Owen Hart, who wrestled primarily in Stampede Wrestling, the World Wrestling Federation (WWF; renamed WWE in 2002), and New Japan Pro Wrestling (NJPW) from 1986 until his death in 1999.

== Background ==
In September 2021, the American professional wrestling promotion All Elite Wrestling (AEW) announced the establishment of the Owen Hart Cup, an annual tournament to honor the legacy of Owen Hart, a prominent wrestler during the 1980s and 1990s who died at the World Wrestling Federation's (WWF, now WWE) Over the Edge pay-per-view in 1999. The tournament was established in collaboration with The Owen Hart Foundation. On December 17, AEW revealed that there would be both a men's and women's version of the tournament, and the respective winners would receive a trophy called "The Owen Cup" as well as championship belts modeled after the old Stampede Wrestling North American Championship. Based on the Hart Family pink and black, the Women's winner receives a pink belt while the Men's winner receives a black belt. It was also confirmed that the tournaments would begin in May, culminating with the finals at Double or Nothing. In deciding why there would be both a men's and women's tournament, Tony Khan likened it to Wimbledon, which also has both men's and women's tournaments.

On the April 26, 2023, episode of Dynamite, Khan announced that the 2023 tournament's opening ceremony would occur at that year's Double or Nothing PPV. He also said that tournament matches would happen in Owen's home country of Canada at the Forbidden Door PPV, and the tournament would conclude in Owen's hometown of Calgary, Alberta, on the fifth episode of Collision on July 15. For 2023, both the men's and women's tournaments featured an eight wrestler field, and wrestlers from AEW partner promotion New Japan Pro Wrestling (NJPW) also participated.

On the Double or Nothing Buy-In, Khan announced that the 2024 tournament would take place and the tournament would conclude in Owen's hometown of Calgary, Alberta, on Dynamite on July 10. The winners of both tournaments would receive a match for the respective world championship in their division (the AEW World Championship for the men, and the AEW Women's World Championship for the women) at All In.

On the April 2, 2025 episode of Dynamite, the brackets were announced for the 2025 tournament. Both the men's and women's tournaments featured an eight wrestler field, and the winners received world championship matches in their respective divisions at All In.

== Winners ==
Year	Winners	Final			Losing finalist	World title match
Year	Winners	Event	Date	Venue	Losing finalist	World title match
2022	Dr. Britt Baker, D.M.D.	Double or Nothing	May 29, 2022	T-Mobile Arena; Paradise, Nevada	Ruby Soho	None
2022	Adam Cole	Double or Nothing	May 29, 2022	T-Mobile Arena; Paradise, Nevada	Samoa Joe	None
2023	Willow Nightingale	Collision	July 15, 2023	Scotiabank Saddledome; Calgary, Alberta	Ruby Soho	None (Note: As a result of defeating ROH Women's World Champion Athena in the semi-finals, Nightingale was given a title shot at Death Before Dishonor; she was unsuccessful.)
2023	Ricky Starks	Collision	July 15, 2023	Scotiabank Saddledome; Calgary, Alberta	CM Punk	None (Note: Due to Starks' cheating in the tournament final, Punk demanded a rematch on the August 5, 2023, Collision with Punk's "Real World Championship" on the line; Starks was unsuccessful.)
2024	Mariah May	Dynamite	July 10, 2024	Scotiabank Saddledome; Calgary, Alberta	Willow Nightingale	Defeated "Timeless" Toni Storm at All In: London
2024	Bryan Danielson	Dynamite	July 10, 2024	Scotiabank Saddledome; Calgary, Alberta	"Hangman" Adam Page	Defeated Swerve Strickland in a Title vs. Career match at All In: London
2025	Mercedes Moné	Double or Nothing	May 25, 2025	Desert Diamond Arena; Glendale, Arizona	Jamie Hayter	Was defeated by "Timeless" Toni Storm at All In: Texas
2025	"Hangman" Adam Page	Double or Nothing	May 25, 2025	Desert Diamond Arena; Glendale, Arizona	Will Ospreay	Defeated Jon Moxley in a Texas Deathmatch at All In: Texas
2026	Mercedes Moné	Forbidden Door	June 28, 2026	SAP Center; San Jose, California	Maya World	Defeated Willow Nightingale at All In: London
2026	Will Ospreay	Forbidden Door	June 28, 2026	SAP Center; San Jose, California	Swerve Strickland	Defeated Kenny Omega at All In London

== Tournament ==
=== 2022 ===
==== Women's ====
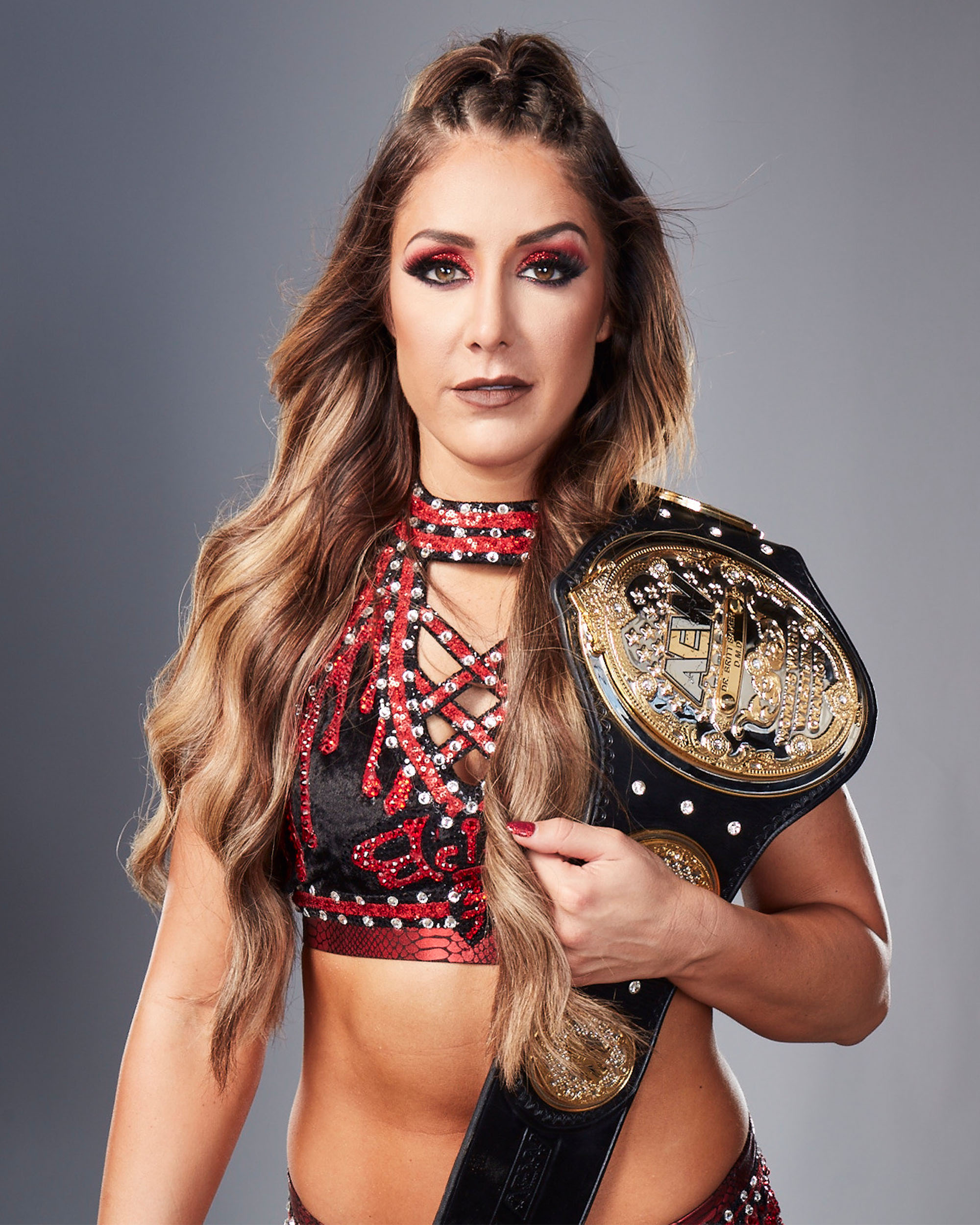
Inaugural women's tournament winner Dr. Britt Baker, D.M.D.

Qualifiers; Dynamite (March 30, April 6 and 20, 2022); Rampage (April 1, 8, and 15, May 6, 2022)
The Bunny	8:40
Toni Storm	Pin
Jamie Hayter	Pin
Skye Blue	5:40
Dr. Britt Baker, D.M.D.	Sub
Danielle Kamela	6:10
—	—
—	Bye
Riho	Pin
Yuka Sakazaki	9:20
Ruby Soho	Pin
Robyn Renegade	8:20
Red Velvet	Pin
Willow Nightingale	5:15
Hikaru Shida	Pin
Julia Hart	7:10

Quarterfinals; Dynamite (May 11 and 18, 2022); Rampage (May 13 and 20, 2022)
Toni Storm	Pin
Jamie Hayter	8:30
Dr. Britt Baker, D.M.D.	Sub
Maki Itoh (Note: Wild Card ("Joker") entrant not revealed until match time.)	6:45
Riho	9:05
Ruby Soho	Pin
Red Velvet	7:35
Kris Statlander (Note: Hikaru Shida was originally scheduled to face Red Velvet, but was removed from the match after she returned to Japan. Statlander was announced as her replacement.)	Pin

Semifinals; Dynamite (May 25, 2022); Rampage (May 27, 2022)
Toni Storm	9:00
Dr. Britt Baker, D.M.D.	Pin
Ruby Soho	Pin
Kris Statlander	10:05

Final; Double or Nothing (May 29, 2022)
Dr. Britt Baker, D.M.D.	Pin
Ruby Soho	13:20

==== Men's ====
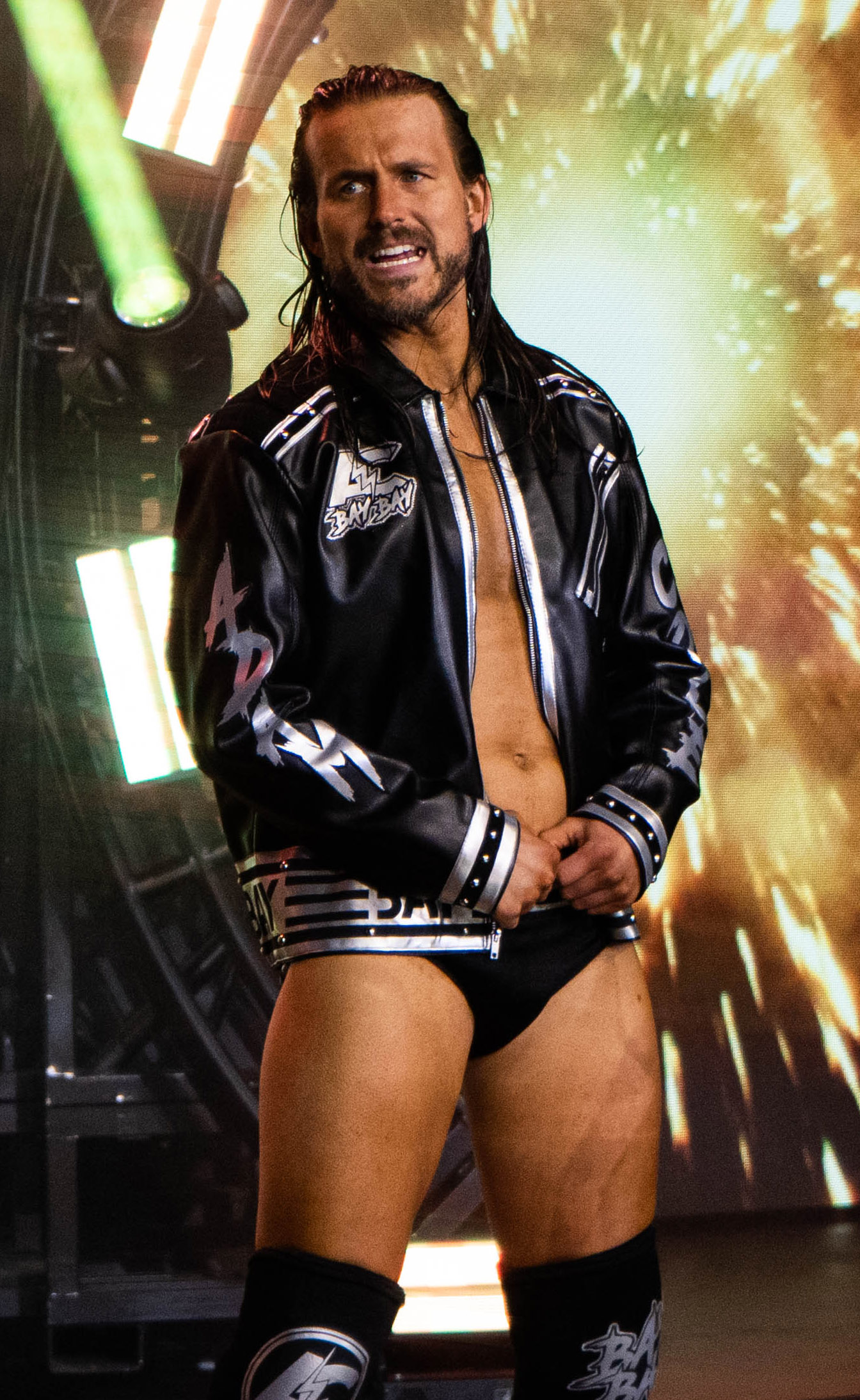
Inaugural men's tournament winner Adam Cole

Qualifiers; Dynamite (April 6, 20, and 27, May 4, 2022); Rampage (April 22 and 29, 2022)
Max Caster	2:45
Samoa Joe	Pin
—	—
—	Bye
Dante Martin	9:40
Rey Fénix	Pin
Kyle O'Reilly	Pin
Jungle Boy	13:00
Adam Cole	Pin
Tomohiro Ishii	11:15
Dax Harwood	Pin
Cash Wheeler	15:05
Swerve Strickland	10:25
Darby Allin	Pin
Bobby Fish	10:20
Jeff Hardy	Pin

Quarterfinals; Dynamite (May 11 and 18, 2022)
Samoa Joe	Pin
Johnny Elite	10:25
Rey Fénix	12:00
Kyle O'Reilly	Sub
Adam Cole	Sub
Dax Harwood	15:35
Darby Allin	10:15
Jeff Hardy	Pin (Note: This was a no disqualification match.)

Semifinals; Dynamite (May 18 and 25, 2022)
Samoa Joe	TKO
Kyle O'Reilly	12:40
Adam Cole	Pin
Jeff Hardy	7:10

Final; Double or Nothing (May 29, 2022)
Samoa Joe	12:30
Adam Cole	Pin

=== 2023 ===
==== Women's ====
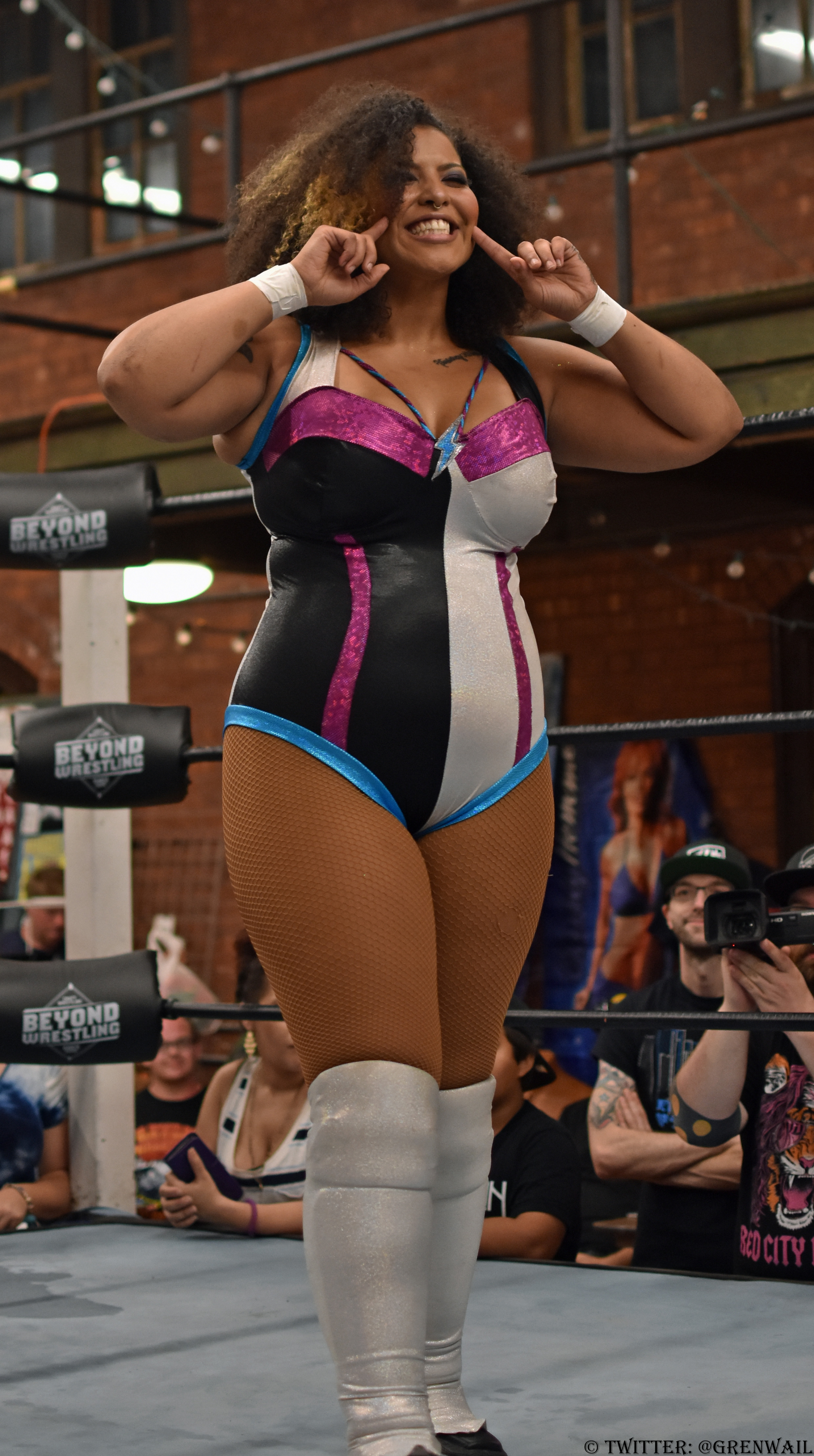
2023 Women's Tournament winner Willow Nightingale

Quarterfinals; Rampage (June 23, 2023); Collision (June 24, 2023); Forbidden Door: Zero Hour (June 25, 2023); Dynamite (July 5, 2023)
Anna Jay A.S.	9:20
Skye Blue	Pin
Dr. Britt Baker, D.M.D.	10:10
Ruby Soho	Pin
Nyla Rose	8:55
Willow Nightingale	Pin
Athena	7:50
Billie Starkz	Pin

Semifinals; Dynamite (July 12, 2023); Rampage (July 14, 2023)
Skye Blue	8:15
Ruby Soho	Pin
Athena	10:00
Willow Nightingale	Pin

Final; Collision (July 15, 2023)
Ruby Soho	9:10
Willow Nightingale	Pin

==== Men's ====
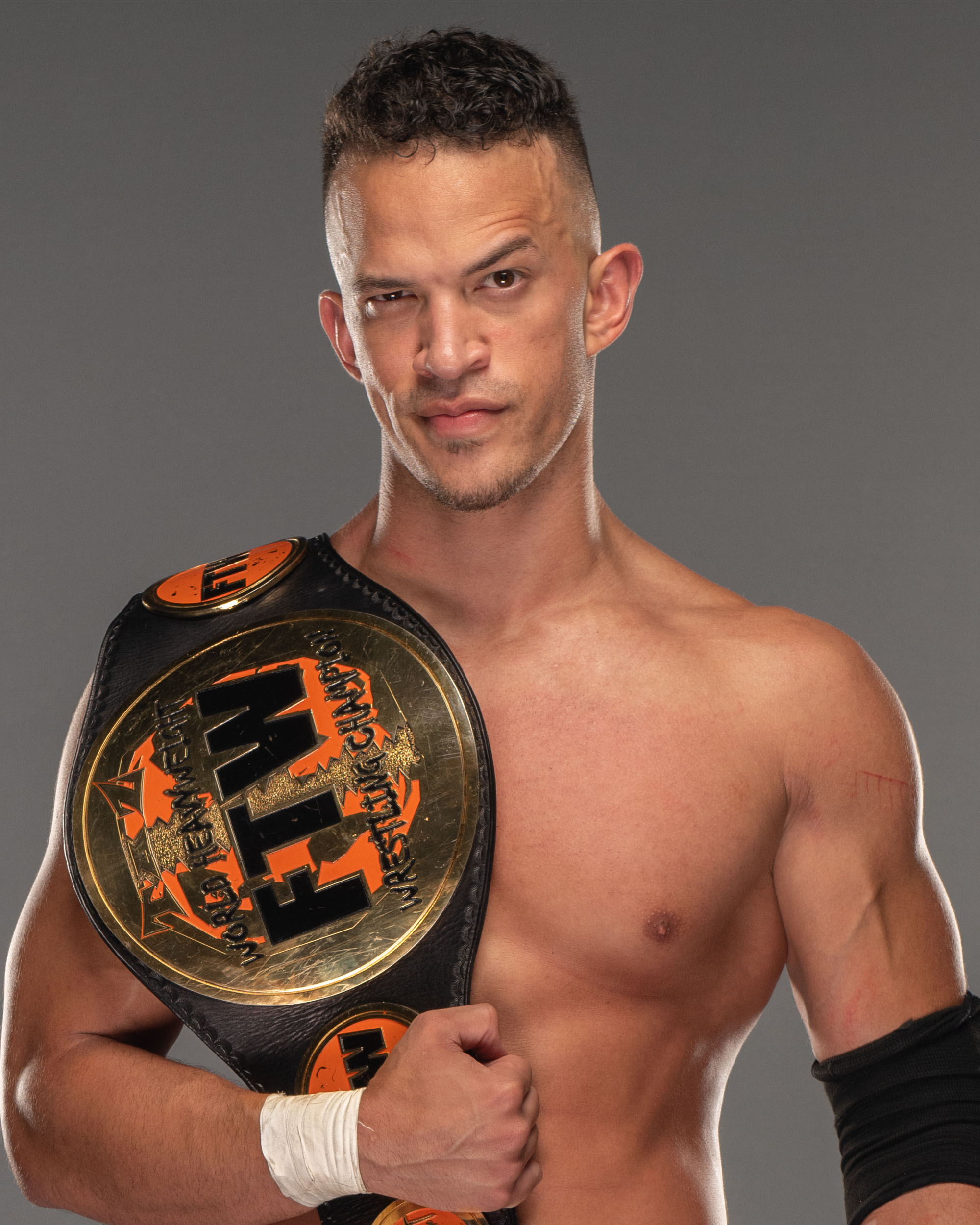
2023 Men's Tournament winner Ricky Starks

Quarterfinals; Forbidden Door (June 25, 2023); Collision (July 1, 2023)
CM Punk	Pin
Satoshi Kojima	13:40
Samoa Joe	Sub
Roderick Strong	12:40
Dustin Rhodes	13:25
Powerhouse Hobbs	Pin
Ricky Starks	Pin
Juice Robinson	12:30

Semifinals; Collision (July 8, 2023)
CM Punk	Pin
Samoa Joe	15:36
Powerhouse Hobbs	10:44
Ricky Starks	Pin

Final; Collision (July 15, 2023)
CM Punk	19:36
Ricky Starks	Pin

=== 2024 ===
==== Women's ====
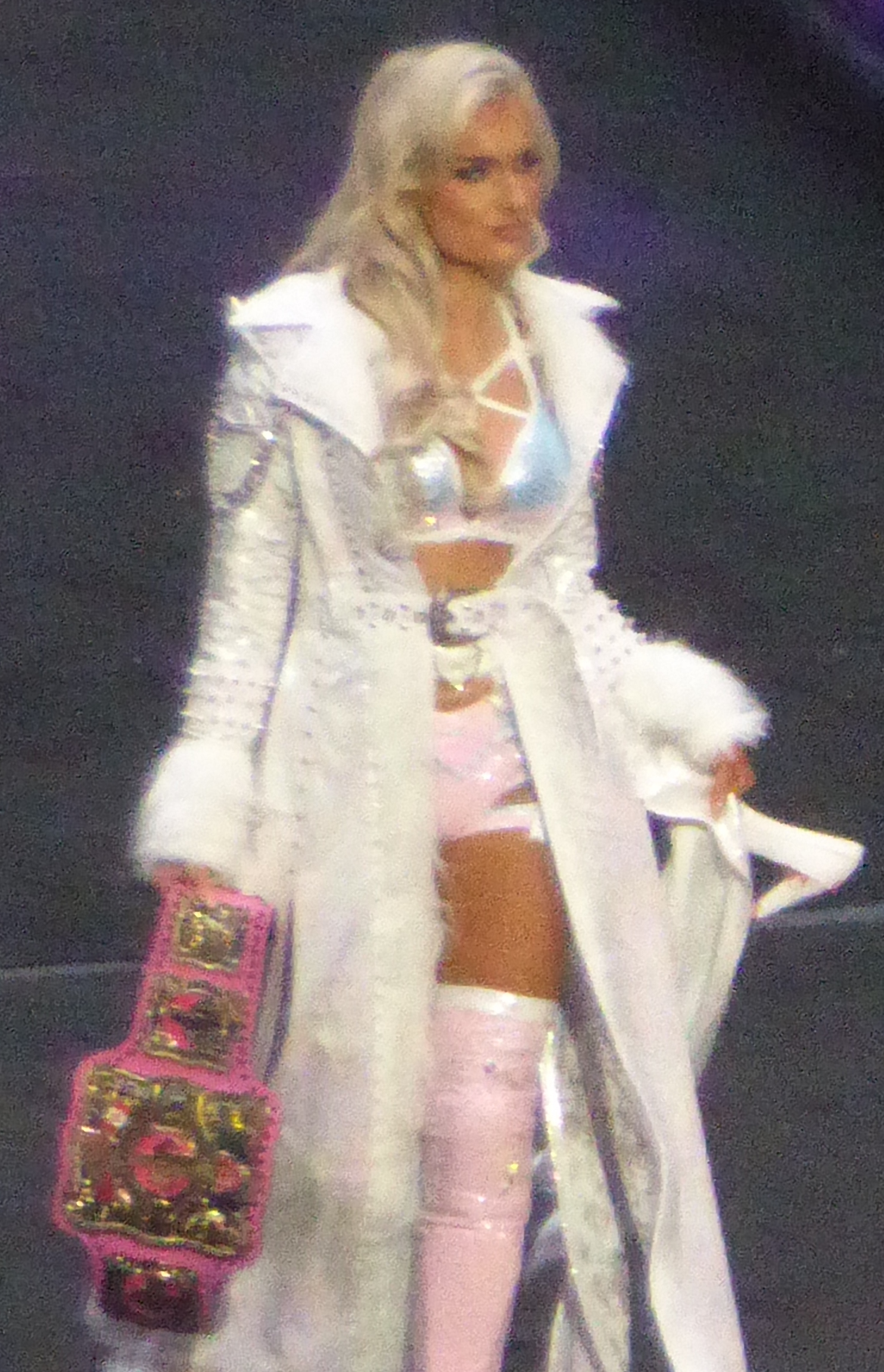
2024 Women's Tournament winner Mariah May holding the tournament championship belt

Quarterfinals; Dynamite (June 19, 2024); Rampage (June 21, 2024); Collision (June 29, 2024); Forbidden Door: Zero Hour (June 30, 2024)
Willow Nightingale	Pin
Serena Deeb	11:00
Kris Statlander	Pin
Nyla Rose	7:50
Deonna Purrazzo	9:05
Hikaru Shida	Pin
Mariah May	Pin
Saraya	8:30

Semifinals; Dynamite: Beach Break (July 3, 2024); Rampage: Beach Break (July 5, 2024)
Willow Nightingale	Pin
Kris Statlander	8:10
Hikaru Shida	12:00
Mariah May	Pin

Final; Dynamite (July 10, 2024)
Willow Nightingale	12:50
Mariah May	Pin

==== Men's ====
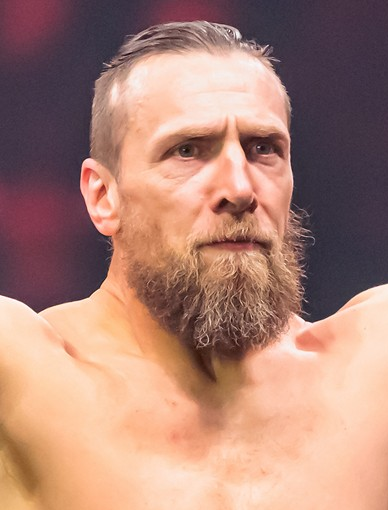
2024 Men's Tournament winner Bryan Danielson

Quarterfinals; Dynamite (June 19 and 26, 2024); Forbidden Door (June 30, 2024); Dynamite: Beach Break (July 3, 2024)
Claudio Castagnoli	11:05
Pac	Pin
Bryan Danielson	Sub
Shingo Takagi	20:20
Rey Fenix	9:20
Jay White	Pin
Jeff Jarrett	11:15
"Hangman" Adam Page	Pin

Semifinals; Dynamite: Beach Break (July 3, 2024); Collision (July 6, 2024)
Pac	16:45
Bryan Danielson	Pin
Jay White	15:40
"Hangman" Adam Page	Pin

Final; Dynamite (July 10, 2024)
Bryan Danielson	Pin
"Hangman" Adam Page	25:45

=== 2025 ===
==== Women's ====
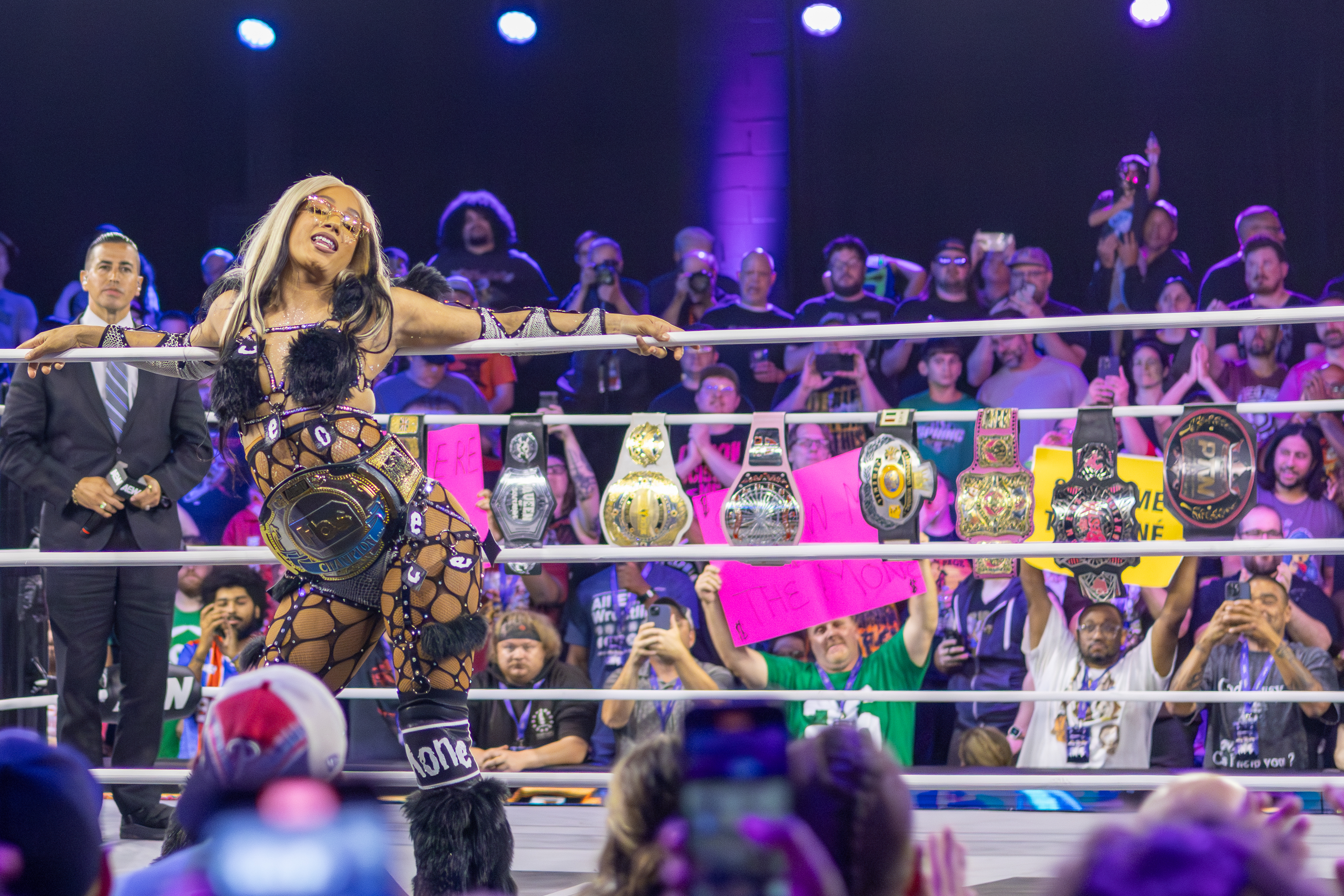
2025 Women's Tournament winner Mercedes Moné showcasing her titles, with the tournament belt displayed third to the right.

Quarterfinals; Dynasty (April 6, 2025); Dynamite (April 9, 2025); Collision (April 12, 2025)
Jamie Hayter	Pin
Billie Starkz	13:55
Thunder Rosa	9:40
Kris Statlander	Pin
Julia Hart	13:00
Mercedes Moné	Pin
Harley Cameron	10:30
Athena	Pin

Semifinals; Dynamite: Spring BreakThru (April 16, 2025); Dynamite (April 23, 2025)
Jamie Hayter	Pin
Kris Statlander	12:10
Mercedes Moné	Pin
Athena	21:10

Final; Double or Nothing (May 25, 2025)
Jamie Hayter	21:15
Mercedes Moné	Pin

==== Men's ====
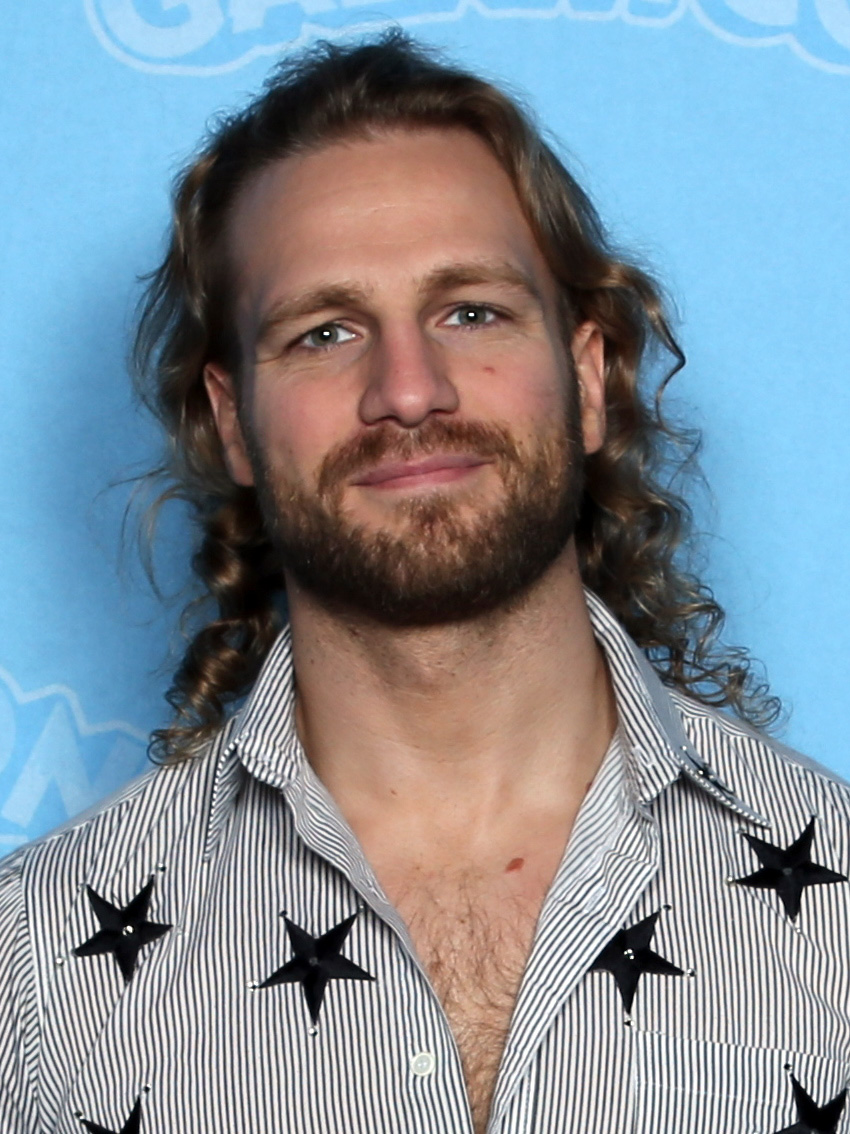
2025 Men's Tournament winner "Hangman" Adam Page

Quarterfinals; Dynasty (April 6, 2025); Collision (April 12, 2025); Dynamite: Spring BreakThru (April 16, 2025)
Will Ospreay	Pin
Kevin Knight (Note: Jay White was originally scheduled to face Will Ospreay, but was removed from the match due to injury. Knight was announced as his replacement.)	13:50
Brody King	12:20
Konosuke Takeshita	Pin
Mark Briscoe	16:15
Kyle Fletcher	Pin
"Hangman" Adam Page	Pin
Josh Alexander	13:05

Semifinals; Dynamite: Spring BreakThru (April 16, 2025); Dynamite (April 30, 2025)
Will Ospreay	Pin
Konosuke Takeshita	21:45
Kyle Fletcher	23:25
"Hangman" Adam Page	Pin

Final; Double or Nothing (May 25, 2025)
Will Ospreay	36:55
"Hangman" Adam Page	Pin

=== 2026 ===
==== Women's ====
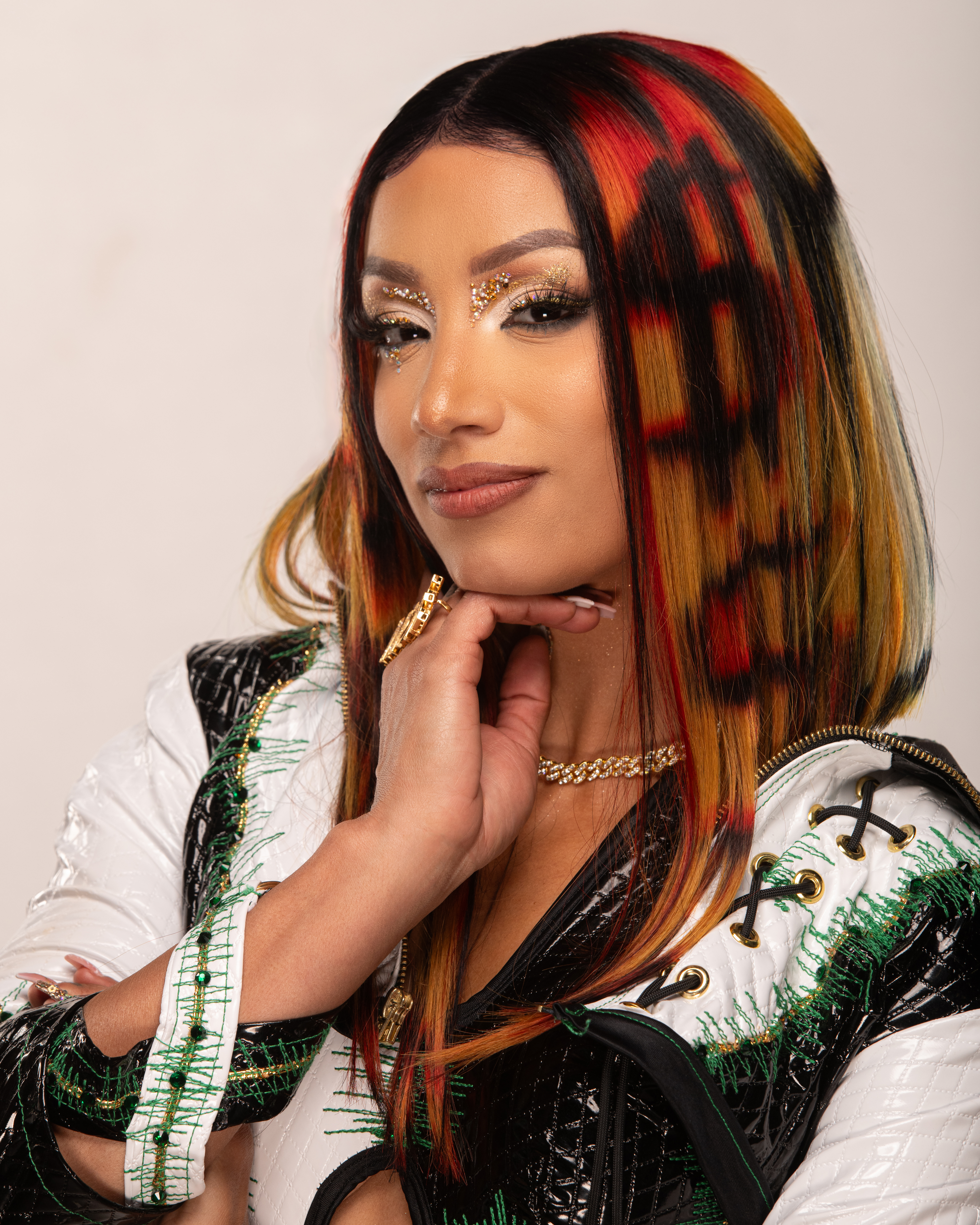
2026 Women's Tournament winner Mercedes Moné, who became the first multi-time Owen Hart Cup champion.

Quarterfinals; Double or Nothing (May 24, 2026); Dynamite (June 3, 2026); Collision (June 6, 2026); Dynamite: Summer Blockbuster (June 10, 2026)
Persephone	12:21
Hazuki	Pin
Mercedes Moné (Note: Willow Nightingale was originally scheduled to face Alex Windsor, but was removed from the match due to injury, thus Windsor would instead face a mystery "Wild Card" participant, later revealed to be Moné.)	Sub
Alex Windsor	12:23
Mina Shirakawa	11:00
Athena	Pin
Skye Blue	11:21
Maya World (Note: Sareee was originally scheduled to face Skye Blue, but was removed from the match due to injury and was replaced by World.)	Pin

Semifinals; Dynamite (June 17, 2026); Collision (June 20, 2026)
Hazuki	22:30
Mercedes Moné	Sub
Athena	14:00
Maya World	Pin

Final; Forbidden Door (June 28, 2026)
Mercedes Moné	Sub
Maya World	24:55

==== Men's ====
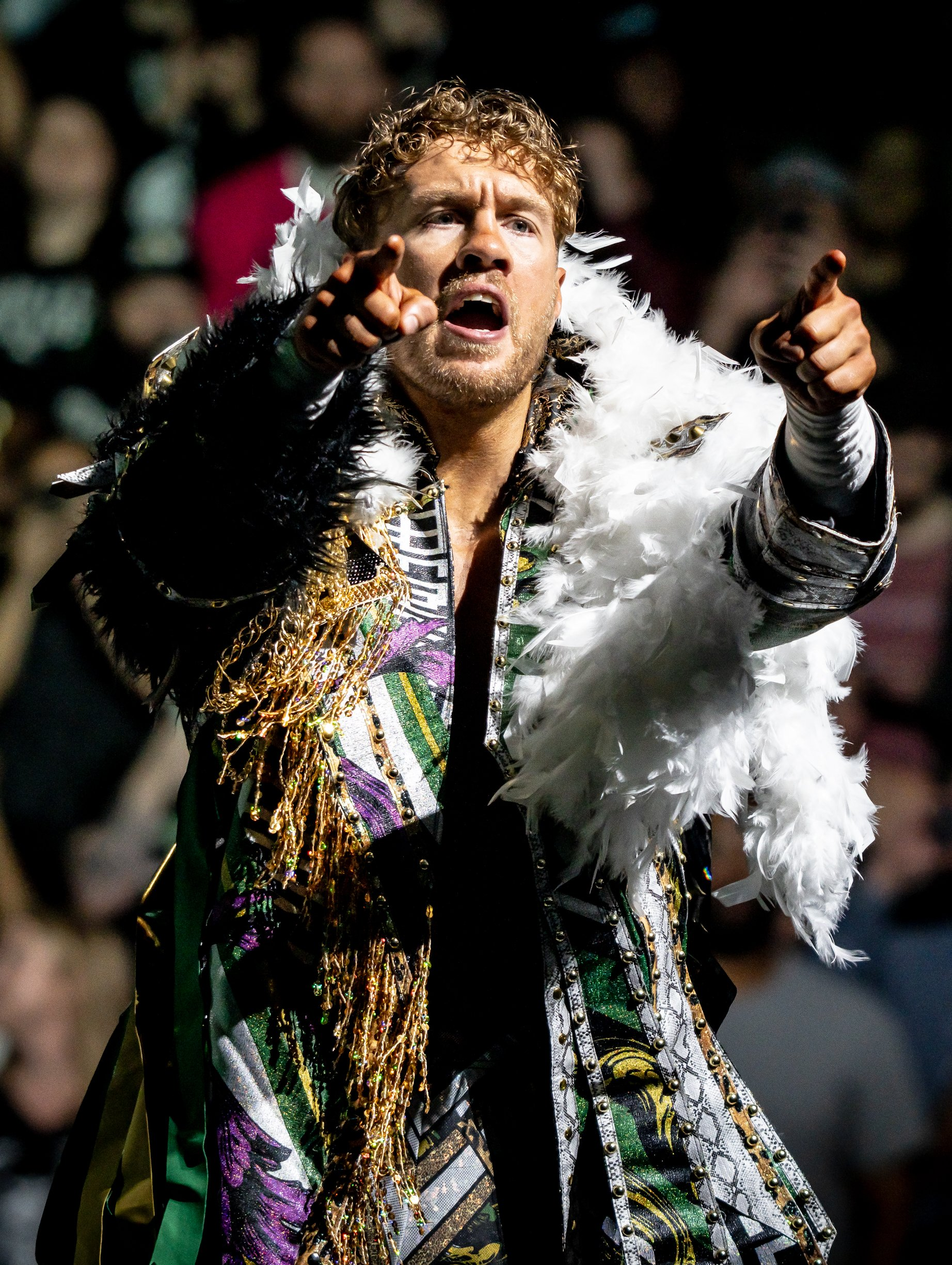
2026 Men's Tournament winner Will Ospreay

Quarterfinals; Double or Nothing (May 24, 2026); Dynamite (May 27, 2026)
Will Ospreay	Pin
Samoa Joe	13:55
Mark Davis	Pin
Jack Perry	17:24
Swerve Strickland	Pin
Bandido	15:20
Claudio Castagnoli	12:01
Brody King	Pin

Semifinals; Dynamite (June 3, 2026); Dynamite: Summer Blockbuster (June 10, 2026)
Will Ospreay	Sub
Mark Davis	23:16
Swerve Strickland	Pin
Brody King	15:00

Final; Forbidden Door (June 28, 2026)
Will Ospreay	Pin
Swerve Strickland	35:30
