= Athena (wrestler) =

American professional wrestler (born 1988)

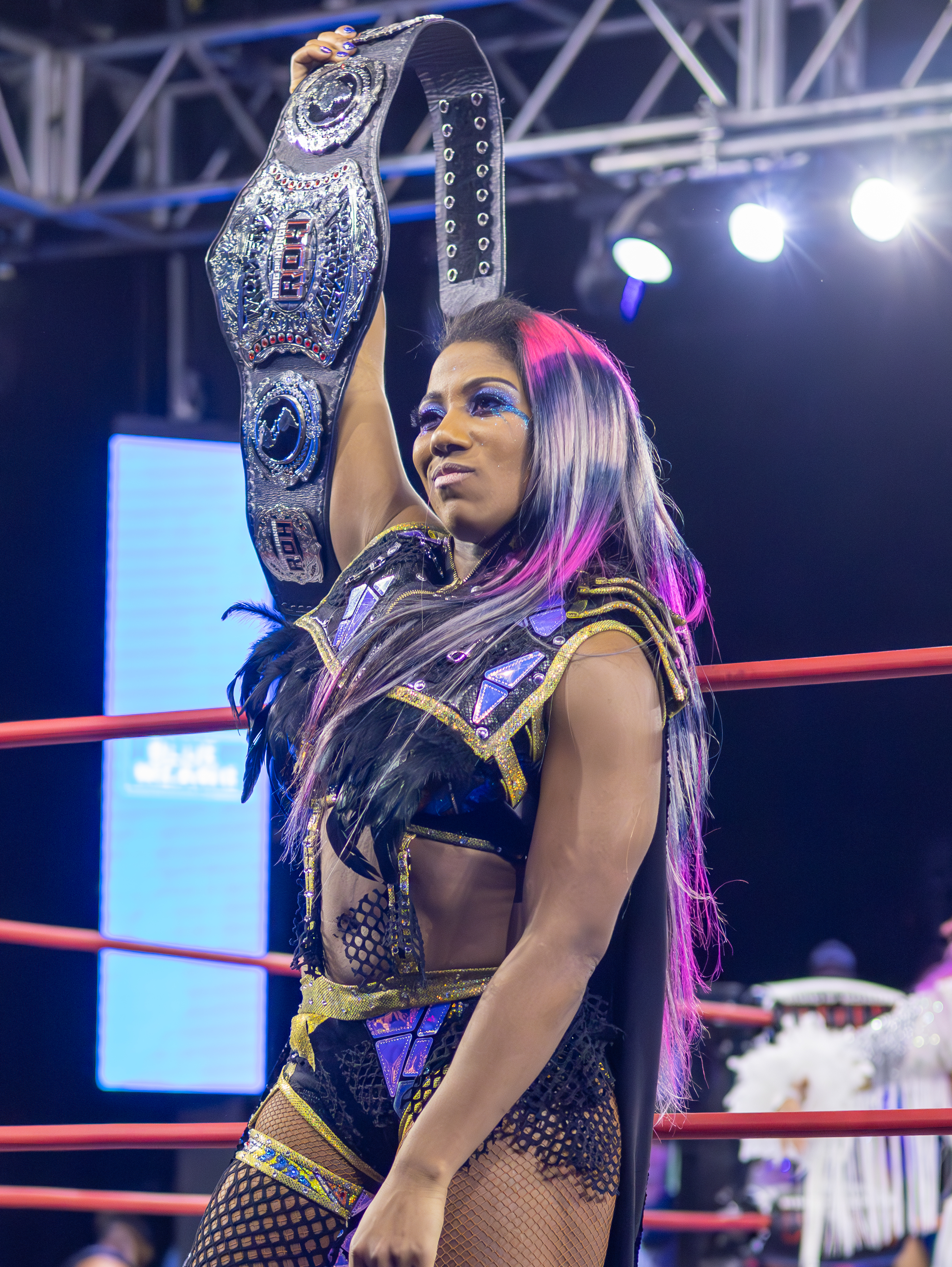
- Athena in 2025

Personal information
- Born: Adrienne Reese; August 31, 1988 (age 38) Garland, Texas, U.S.
- Spouse: Matthew Palmer (m. 2018)

Professional wrestling career
- Ring name(s): Adrienne; Adrienne Reese; Athena; Athena Reese; Ember Moon
- Billed height: 5 ft 3 in (160 cm)
- Billed weight: 120 lb (54 kg)
- Billed from: Dallas, Texas; Chicago, Illinois; St. Louis, Missouri
- Trained by: Skandor Akbar; Action Jackson; Lance Archer; Monty Brown; Booker T Rodney Mack & Jazz
- Debut: 2007

Adrienne Palmer (née Reese; born August 31, 1988) is an American professional wrestler. She is signed to All Elite Wrestling (AEW), where she performs under the ring name Athena. She primarily appears in AEW's sister promotion Ring of Honor (ROH), where she is the leader of the M.I.T stable and the current ROH Women's World Champion in her first reign which is the longest in the title’s history and longest-reign in ROH history. She also makes appearances on the independent circuit and is the co-owner of Metroplex Wrestling.

She is also known for her time in WWE, where she worked under the name Ember Moon, where she is a former NXT Women's Tag Team Champion and a former NXT Women's Champion. Before going to WWE, she wrestled on the independent circuit as Athena for promotions such as Shimmer Women Athletes or, Women Superstars Uncensored.

== Early life ==
Reese was born in Garland, Texas on August 31, 1988. She attended Lakeview Centennial High School where she played tennis and softball as well as participating in the school's chess club and the mathlete program. During her time in high school, Reese was maliciously bullied by her peers for her interests in video games and wrestling.

== Professional wrestling career ==
=== Independent circuit (2007–2015) ===
Reese was first introduced to professional wrestling by her grandfather, and she began training under Skandor Akbar in April 2007. She later trained at Booker T's Pro Wrestling Alliance (now named Reality of Wrestling) based in Houston, Texas, and began wrestling as Trouble in 2007 and later, Athena. Athena also wrestled for various other Texas-based promotions, most notably Anarchy Championship Wrestling (ACW), based in Austin, where she won the women's title, ACW American Joshi Championship three times, as well the ACW Television Championship. From 2010 to 2015, she also worked for the all-female promotions Shimmer Women Athletes and Women Superstars Uncensored.

=== Ring of Honor (2013–2015) ===
Between 2013 and 2015, Reese worked for Ring of Honor (ROH) as part of a stable by the name of Team RnB alongside A.C.H. who joined TaDarius Thomas and then the two became a ROH tag team by the name of Adrenaline Rush consisting of A.C.H and TaDarius Thomas only. Also during this time period in ROH in the ROH Women of Honor division Athena competed in matches against talent such as MsChif, Barbi Hayden, Cherry Bomb, Scarlett Bordeaux and more before silently being departed from ROH in 2015.

=== WWE (2015–2021) ===
==== NXT (2015–2018) ====
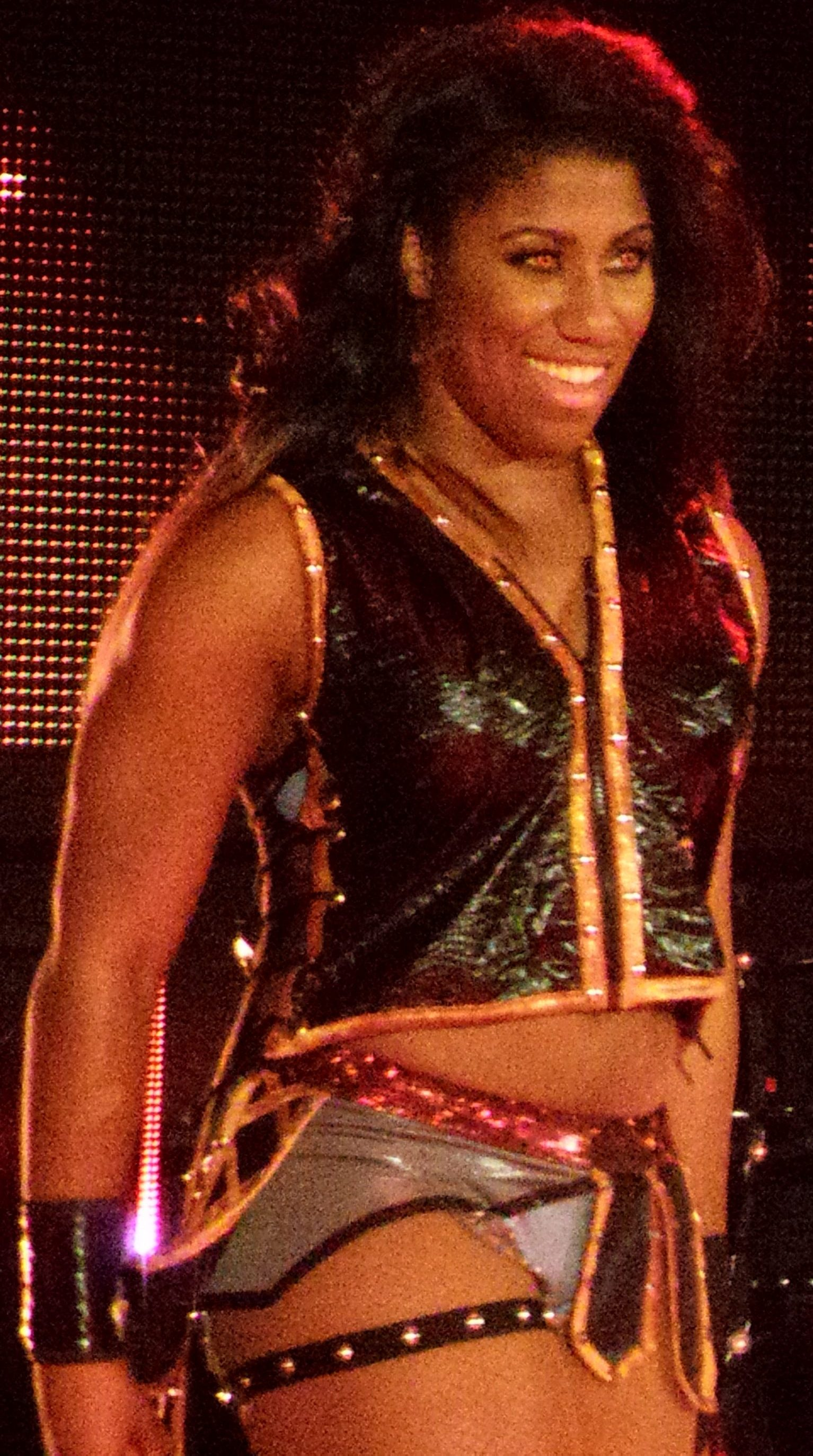
Ember Moon in 2017

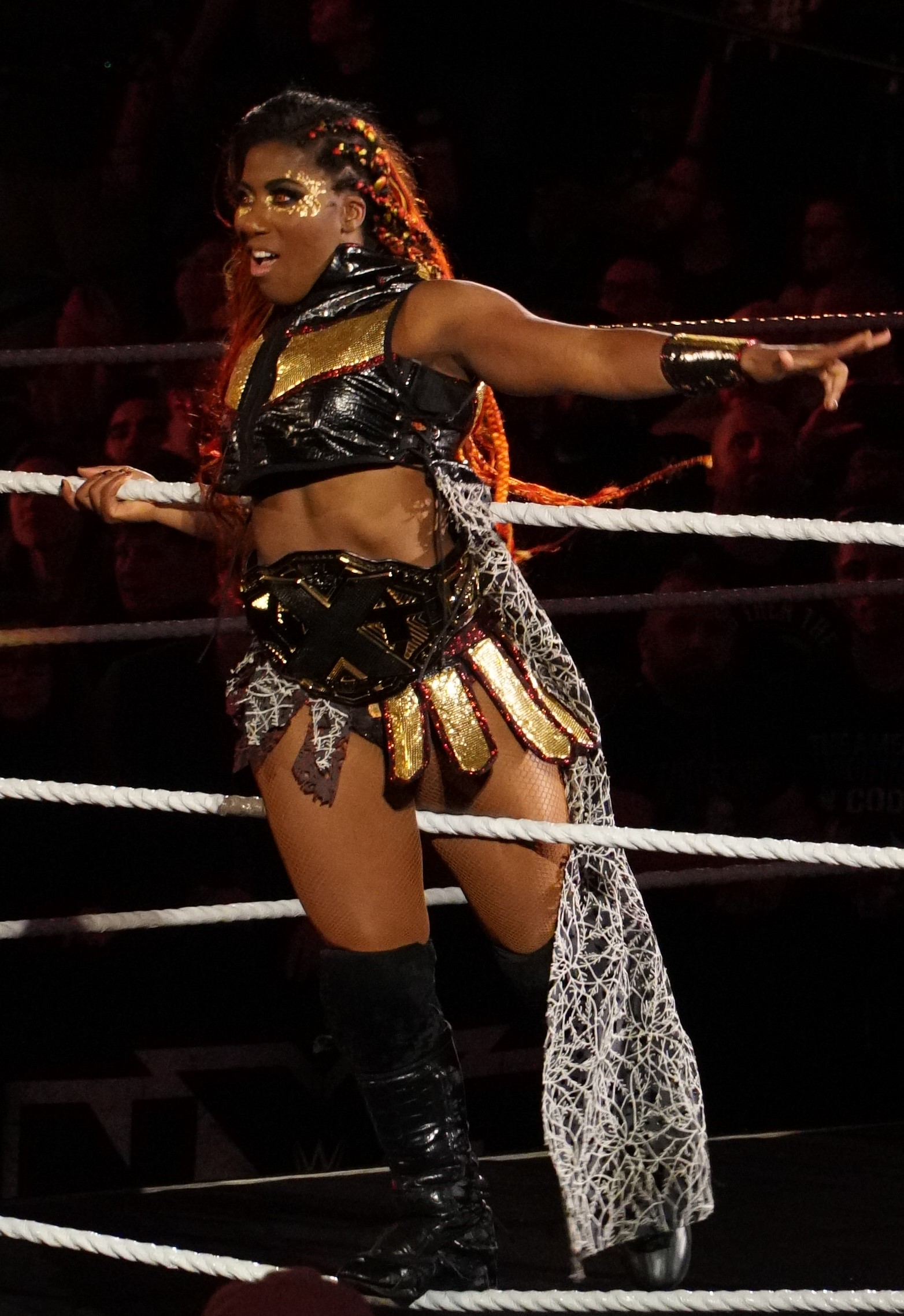
Moon as the NXT Women's Champion in April 2018

In September 2015 Reese signed a contract with WWE, and was assigned to their developmental territory, NXT. She wrestled as Adrien Reese or Adrienne Reese from October 2015 until June 2016, when her name was changed to Ember Moon. After a series of introductory vignettes, Moon made her television debut at NXT TakeOver: Brooklyn II, defeating Billie Kay. Throughout the following months, Ember Moon went on a winning streak in tag team matches, and also in singles matches, until losing to NXT Women's Champion Asuka at NXT TakeOver: Orlando on April 1. In May, Moon sustained a shoulder injury after being thrown out of the ring by Asuka.

After she returned on June, she faced Asuka again for the championship at NXT TakeOver: Brooklyn III, but was once again defeated. In August, Asuka had to vacate the NXT Women's Championship due to an injury. On November 18, Moon won the vacant NXT Women's Championship in a fatal-four-way match, defeating Royce, Nikki Cross, and Kairi Sane. As champion, Moon held the title for 140 days, feuding with Shayna Baszler. At NXT TakeOver: Philadelphia, Moon retained her title against her, but lost it at NXT TakeOver: New Orleans.

==== Main roster (2018–2020) ====
Moon made first appearance on the main roster at the 2018 Royal Rumble, where she participated in the first women's Royal Rumble match. After losing the NXT Women's Title, she was promoted to Raw, and made her in-ring debut on the Raw episode after WrestleMania 34 as Nia Jax's tag team partner, taking on Alexa Bliss and Mickie James in a winning effort. At Money in the Bank, she participated in the Money in the Bank ladder match, but failed to win the briefcase. At WWE Evolution she participated in a battle royal and was the last participant eliminated by Nia Jax. At the 2019 Royal Rumble event, Moon participated in the women's Royal Rumble match, entering at number six and lasting 52 minutes before being eliminated by Alexa Bliss. During the match, she suffered an elbow injury, the recovery from which necessitated surgery, keeping her out of action for a while. She returned at WrestleMania 35 in the WrestleMania Women's Battle Royal, from which she was eliminated by Lana. During the 2019 WWE Superstar Shake-up, Moon was moved to the SmackDown brand. In June, she participated in her second Money in the Bank ladder match but was unsuccessful.

Throughout June and July, Moon feuded with Mandy Rose and Sonya Deville, who bullied her. After losing singles matches to both Deville and Rose on the June 25 and the July 2 episodes of SmackDown, respectively, Moon teamed up with SmackDown Women's Champion Bayley to defeat Rose and Deville on the July 16 episode, ending the feud. After the match, Bayley picked Moon as her challenger for SummerSlam. However, Moon lost the match and started a losing streak, going winless in five straight televised matches. Moon would then suffer an ankle injury, and she was not in either of the draft pools for the 2019 WWE Draft in October. She appeared on the November 19 episode of WWE Backstage as an analyst and stated she would be out of action for an indefinite period of time.

==== Return to NXT (2020–2021) ====
In 2020, after months of inactivity, Moon was assigned back to NXT, where she debuted a new character. In September 2020, vignettes advertising a mysterious figure on a motorcycle appeared on NXT on consecutive weeks. At NXT TakeOver 31, the mystery figure took off her helmet and revealed herself to be Moon. She formed a tag team with Shotzi Blackheart, participating in the first ever women's Dusty Rhodes Tag Team Classic, where they lost to Dakota Kai and Raquel González in the finals. They won the NXT Women's Tag Team Championship on March 10, 2021, when they defeated Kai and González. Despite retaining the titles at NXT Takeover: Stand & Deliver against The Way (Candice LeRae and Indi Hartwell), they lost it against them on the May 4 episode of NXT in a Street Fight, ending their reign at 55 days. At NXT TakeOver: In Your House, Moon challenged Raquel González for the NXT Women's Championship but was defeated. On November 4, Moon was released from WWE along with various other superstars, ending her six-year tenure with the company.

=== Return to the independent circuit (2022–present) ===
Reese, now going by her old ring name Athena, would challenge Thunder Rosa for the Warrior Wrestling Women's Championship on February 12. At the event, Rosa retained the title after the two wrestled to a 30-minute draw. On June 15, 2025, Athena announced that she will be hosting an all-women's wrestling event called Who Runs The World?, that will take place on August 9. A second such event took place later that year, with a third planned for March 2026. The events are being held under the Metroplex Wrestling banner, the indie promotion/wrestling school owned by her and her husband.

=== All Elite Wrestling / Return to ROH (2022–present) ===
Athena made her debut for All Elite Wrestling (AEW) on May 29, 2022, at Double or Nothing, coming to the aid of Anna Jay and Kris Statlander during Jade Cargill's match. After beginning an undefeated singles run, she challenged Cargill for the TBS Championship at All Out in September but was unsuccessful. Later that month, she challenged interim AEW Women's World Champion Toni Storm in a four-way match also involving Dr. Britt Baker, D.M.D. and Serena Deeb, which Storm won. On the November 18 episode of Rampage, Athena attacked referee Aubrey Edwards after a victory, turning heel. At Final Battle on December 10, she defeated Mercedes Martinez to win the ROH Women's World Championship.

Throughout 2023, Athena established herself as a dominant champion, repeatedly attacking opponents after matches. At Supercard of Honor, she retained her title against Yuka Sakazaki. On July 21 at Death Before Dishonor, she defeated Willow Nightingale in the main event, marking the first time a women's match headlined an ROH pay-per-view. In late 2023, Athena became the mentor of Billie Starkz and Lexy Nair, forming the stable M.I.T. with them. After tensions developed between Athena and Starkz, the two faced each other for the ROH Women's World Championship at Final Battle, where Athena retained her title.

At Supercard of Honor on April 5, 2024, she defeated former AEW Women's World Champion Hikaru Shida to retain her championship. On September 15, 2024, Athena surpassed Samoa Joe's record ROH World Championship reign of 645 days, becoming the longest-reigning champion in ROH history. At Final Battle in December, she again defeated Billie Starkz to retain her title before expelling Nair from M.I.T. later that month.

Athena reached 800 days as ROH Women's World Champion on February 17, 2025. She returned to AEW programming on March 29, confronting reigning TBS Champion Mercedes Moné and entering the Owen Hart Foundation Women's Tournament. After defeating Harley Cameron in the quarterfinals, she lost to Moné in the semifinals at Spring BreakThru on April 16. On July 12 at All In, Athena won the women's Casino Gauntlet match, earning a future AEW Women's World Championship match. She invoked her opportunity against Timeless Toni Storm at Forbidden Door on August 24 but failed to win the championship. On September 5, she reached 1,000 days as ROH Women's World Champion. At Worlds End in December, she and Moné unsuccessfully challenged the Babes of Wrath (Harley Cameron and Willow Nightingale) for the AEW Women's World Tag Team Championship.

At Supercard of Honor on May 15, 2026, Athena retained her title in the first women's Survival of the Fittest match. She subsequently entered her third Owen Hart Cup, defeating Mina Shirakawa in the quarterfinals before losing to her protégé Maya World in the semifinals on the June 20 episode of AEW Collision.

=== World Wonder Ring Stardom (2025–2026) ===
Athena made her debut for World Wonder Ring Stardom at Stardom New Year Dream on January 3, 2025, where she teamed with Thekla to defeat Mina Shirakawa and Tay Melo. Two nights later at Wrestle Dynasty, Athena represented Ring of Honor in the International Women's Cup four-way match, but failed to win after Thekla interfered. On January 13 at Stardom New Year Stars in Korakuen Hall, Athena successfully defended her ROH Women's World Championship against Thekla. Athena returned to Stardom At Stardom American Dream 2026 on April 17, 2026, defeating Rina.

=== New Japan Pro-Wrestling (2026) ===
On February 27, 2026 at The New Beginning USA, Athena made her New Japan Pro-Wrestling (NJPW) debut, unsuccessfully challenging Syuri for the IWGP Women's Championship.

== Personal life ==
Reese is married to fellow professional wrestler, Matthew Palmer. She and Matthew own and operate MPX Wrestling, an independent wrestling promotion and training academy in Bedford, Texas.

She is a fan of comic books and the 1960s Batman television series starring Adam West. Reese has cited Eddie Guerrero, Kurt Angle, The Rock, Rikishi, Too Cool, Taka Michinoku, Funaki, Trish Stratus, Lita, Victoria, and Beth Phoenix as her influences.

== Championships and accomplishments ==
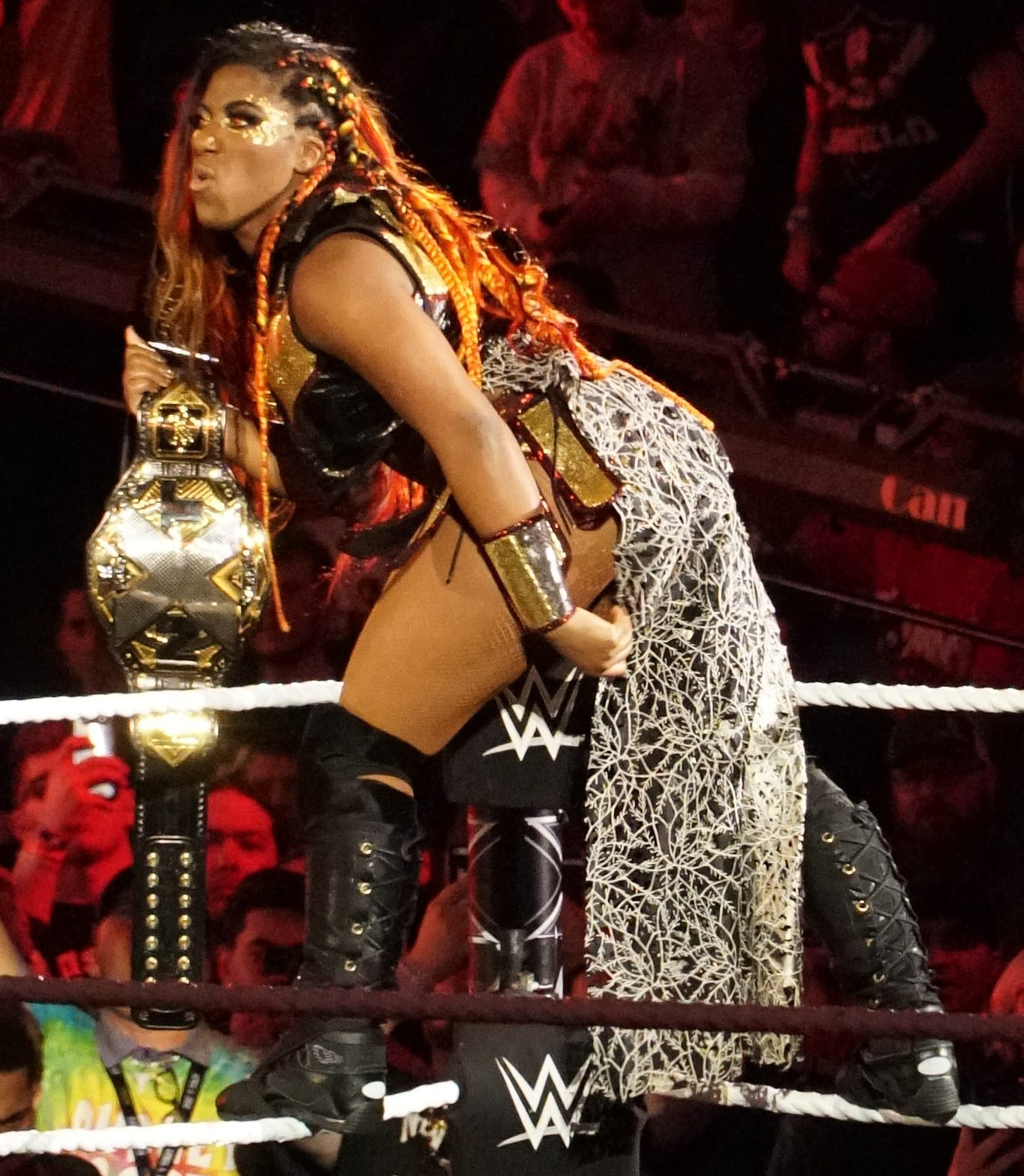
As Ember Moon, she is a former NXT Women's Champion.

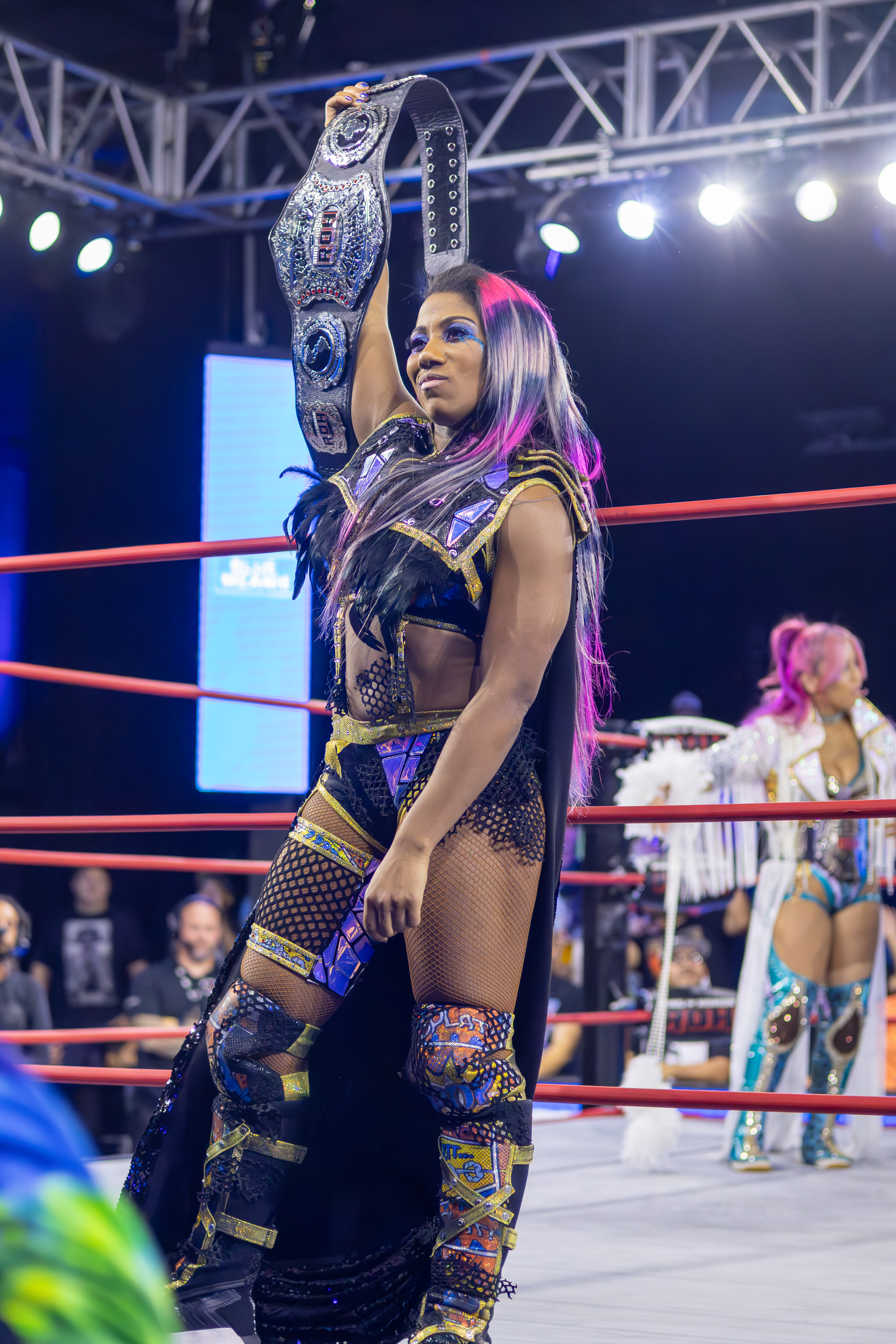
As ROH Women's World Champion, Athena is the longest-reigning champion in ROH history.

- All Elite Wrestling
  - Casino Gauntlet match (2025)
- Anarchy Championship / Absolute Intense Wrestling
  - AIW Women's Championship (2 times)
  - ACW American Joshi Championship (3 times)
  - ACW Televised Championship (1 time)
  - ACW Queen of Queens Tournament (2012)
- Pro Wrestling Alliance
  - PWA Women's Championship (1 time)
- Pro Wrestling Illustrated
  - Ranked No. 18 of the top 50 female wrestlers in the PWI Female 50 in 2017
  - Ranked No. 6 of the top 250 women's wrestlers in the PWI Women's 250 in 2023
  - Ranked No. 7 of the top 250 women's wrestlers in the PWI Women's 250 in 2025
- Women Superstars Uncensored / Combat Zone Wrestling
  - Queen and King of the Ring (2013) – with A. R. Fox
- Ring of Honor
  - ROH Women's World Championship (1 time, current)
- WWE
  - NXT Women's Championship (1 time)
  - NXT Women's Tag Team Championship (1 time) – with Shotzi Blackheart
- Warrior Wrestling
  - Warrior Wrestling Women's Championship (1 time)
