= 2004 in professional wrestling =

2004 in professional wrestling describes the year's events in the world of professional wrestling.

== List of notable promotions ==
These promotions held notable events in 2004.

Promotion Name	Abbreviation	Notes
Consejo Mundial de Lucha Libre	CMLL	
Georgia Championship Wrestling	GCW	
Lucha Libre AAA Worldwide	AAA	The "AAA" abbreviation has been used since the mid-1990s and had previously stood for the promotion's original name Asistencia Asesoría y Administración.
New Japan Pro-Wrestling	NJPW	
Ring of Honor	ROH	
Total Nonstop Action Wrestling	TNA	
World Wrestling Council	WWC	
World Wrestling Entertainment	WWE	WWE divided its roster into two storyline divisions, Raw and SmackDown!, referred to as brands, where wrestlers exclusively performed on their respective weekly television programs.

== Calendar of notable shows ==
=== January ===
Date	Promotion(s)	Event	Location	Main Event
4	NJPW	Wrestling World	Tokyo, Japan	Shinsuke Nakamura (c) defeated Yoshihiro Takayama (c) in a Singles match for both the IWGP Heavyweight Championship (Nakamura) and the NWF Heavyweight Championship (Takayama). The NWF title was unified with the IWGP title. As a result, the NWF title was retired.
25	WWE: Raw; SmackDown!	Royal Rumble	Philadelphia, Pennsylvania	Chris Benoit won by last eliminating Big Show in a 30-man Royal Rumble match for a world championship match at WrestleMania XX
(c) – denotes defending champion(s)

=== February ===
Date	Promotion(s)	Event	Location	Main Event
14	ROH	Second Anniversary Show	Braintree, Massachusetts	A.J. Styles defeated CM Punk in a tournament final for the inaugural Pure Wrestling Championship
15	WWE: SmackDown!	No Way Out	Daly City, California	Eddie Guerrero defeated Brock Lesnar (c) in a Singles match for the WWE Championship
(c) – denotes defending champion(s)

=== March ===
Date	Promotion(s)	Event	Location	Main Event
14	WWE: Raw; SmackDown!	WrestleMania XX	New York City, New York	Chris Benoit defeated Triple H (c) and Shawn Michaels by submission in a Triple threat match for the World Heavyweight Championship
21	AAA	Rey de Reyes	Naucalpan, Mexico	Jeff Jarrett defeated Latin Lover in a Singles match in the 2004 Rey de Reyes tournament final
(c) – denotes defending champion(s)

=== April ===
Date	Promotion(s)	Event	Location	Main Event
18	WWE: Raw	Backlash	Edmonton, Alberta	Chris Benoit (c) defeated Shawn Michaels and Triple H by submission in a Triple Threat match for the World Heavyweight Championship
30	CMLL	48. Aniversario de Arena México	Mexico City, Mexico	Damian El Terrible defeated Máscara Mágica in a Best two-out-of-three falls Lucha de Apuestas hair vs. hair match
(c) – denotes defending champion(s)

=== May ===
Date	Promotion(s)	Event	Location	Main Event
16	WWE: SmackDown!	Judgment Day	Los Angeles, California	John "Bradshaw" Layfield defeated Eddie Guerrero (c) by disqualification in a Singles match for the WWE Championship
(c) – denotes defending champion(s)

=== June ===
Date	Promotion(s)	Event	Location	Main Event
13	WWE: Raw	Bad Blood	Columbus, Ohio	Triple H defeated Shawn Michaels in a Hell in a Cell match
20	AAA	Triplemanía XII	Naucalpan, Mexico	La Parka defeated Cibernético in a Best two-out-of-three falls Lucha de Apuestas "Mask vs. Mask" match
27	WWE: SmackDown!	The Great American Bash	Norfolk, Virginia	The Undertaker defeated The Dudley Boyz (Bubba Ray Dudley and D-Von Dudley) in a Handicap Concrete Crypt match
(c) – denotes defending champion(s)

=== July ===
Date	Promotion(s)	Event	Location	Main Event
11	WWE: Raw	Vengeance	Hartford, Connecticut	Chris Benoit (c) defeated Triple H in a Singles match for the World Heavyweight Championship
23	ROH	Death Before Dishonor 2	Wauwatosa, Wisconsin	The Second City Saints (CM Punk and Colt Cabana) (c) vs. The Briscoe Brothers (Jay Briscoe and Mark Briscoe) in a Two Out of Three Falls match for the ROH World Tag Team Championship
24	ROH	Death Before Dishonor 2	Chicago Ridge, Illinois	The Second City Saints (CM Punk and Ace Steel) vs. Dan Maff and B. J. Whitmer in a Chicago Street Fight
(c) – denotes defending champion(s)

=== August ===
Date	Promotion(s)	Event	Location	Main Event
7-15	NJPW	G1 Climax	Tokyo	Hiroyoshi Tenzan defeated Hiroshi Tanahashi by submission in a G1 Climax tournament final
10	GCW	First Annual Fred Ward Memorial Show	Columbus, Georgia	Jason Cross defeated Johnny Swinger in a Finals tournament match
15	WWE: Raw; SmackDown!	SummerSlam	Toronto, Ontario	Randy Orton defeated Chris Benoit (c) in a Singles match for the World Heavyweight Championship
21	WWC	WWC 31st Aniversario	Caguas, Puerto Rico	Carly Colón defeated Eddie Colón in a Singles match
(c) – denotes defending champion(s)

=== September ===
Date	Promotion(s)	Event	Location	Main Event
11	ROH	Glory By Honor 3	Elizabeth, New Jersey	The Havana Pitbulls (Ricky Reyes and Rocky Romero) (c) defeated B. J. Whitmer and Dan Maff and Generation Next (Jack Evans and Roderick Strong) and The Carnage Crew (DeVito and H. C. Loc) in an Ultimate Endurance Match for the ROH Tag Team Championship
12	WWE: Raw	Unforgiven	Portland, Oregon	Triple H defeated Randy Orton (c) in a Singles match for the World Heavyweight Championship
17	CMLL	CMLL 71st Anniversary Show	Mexico City, Mexico	Universo 2000 lost to Canek, also in the match: Dr. Wagner Jr. and Rayo de Jalisco Jr. in a Four-way Lucha de Apuesta mask vs. mask elimination match
(c) – denotes defending champion(s)

=== October ===
Date	Promotion(s)	Event	Location	Main Event
3	WWE: SmackDown!	No Mercy	East Rutherford, New Jersey	John "Bradshaw" Layfield (c) defeated The Undertaker in a Last Ride match for the WWE Championship
16	AAA	Verano de Escándalo	Orizaba, Mexico	Mosco de la Merced lost to Heavy Metal, El Intocable, Zorro and Los Vipers (Histeria and Psicosis) in a Steel cage match
19	WWE: Raw	Taboo Tuesday	Milwaukee, Wisconsin	Randy Orton defeated Ric Flair in a Steel cage match
(c) – denotes defending champion(s)

=== November ===
Date	Promotion(s)	Event	Location	Main Event	Notes
7	TNA	Victory Road	Orlando, Florida	Jeff Jarrett (c) defeated Jeff Hardy in a Ladder match for the NWA World Heavyweight Championship	TNA's first monthly three-hour PPV event.
14	WWE: Raw; SmackDown!	Survivor Series	Cleveland, Ohio	Team Orton (Randy Orton, Chris Benoit, Chris Jericho and Maven) defeated Team Triple H (Triple H, Batista, Edge and Gene Snitsky) in a 4-on-4 Survivor Series elimination match Whichever team won would each be in charge of Raw for the next 4 weeks	
(c) – denotes defending champion(s)

=== December ===
Date	Promotion(s)	Event	Location	Main Event
5	AAA	Guerra de Titanes	Naucalpan, Mexico	Cibernético and La Parka defeated La Legión Extranjera (Konnan and Rikishi) by disqualification in a tag team match
5	TNA	Turning Point	Orlando, Florida	America's Most Wanted (Chris Harris and James Storm) defeated Triple X (Christopher Daniels and Elix Skipper) in a Six Sides of Steel match
12	WWE: SmackDown!	Armageddon	Duluth, Georgia	John "Bradshaw" Layfield (c) defeated Booker T, Eddie Guerrero and The Undertaker in a Fatal-4-Way match for the WWE Championship
17	CMLL	Sin Piedad	Mexico City, Mexico	Los Hermanos Dinamita (Cien Caras and Máscara Año 2000) defeated Pierroth and Vampiro Canadiense in a Best two-out-of-three falls tag team Lucha de Apuestas hair vs. hair match
23	WWE: SmackDown!	Tribute to the Troops	Tirikt, Iraq	Eddie Guerrero and Rey Mysterio defeated Kurt Angle and Luther Reigns in a tag team match
26	ROH	Final Battle	Philadelphia, Pennsylvania	Samoa Joe (c) vs. Austin Aries in a Singles match for the ROH World Championship
(c) – denotes defending champion(s)

== Accomplishments and tournaments ==
=== AAA ===
Accomplishment	Winner	Date won	Notes
Rey de Reyes	Jeff Jarrett	March 21	

=== AJW ===
Accomplishment	Winner	Date won	Notes
Japan Grand Prix 2004	Kumiko Maekawa	August 1	
Tag League The Best 2004	Kumiko Maekawa and Saki Maemura	December 26	

=== Ring of Honor ===
Accomplishment	Winner	Date won	Notes
ROH Pure Wrestling Championship Tournament	A.J. Styles	February 2	
ROH Pure Championship Tournament	Doug Williams	July 17	

=== TNA ===
Accomplishment	Winner	Date won	Notes
NWA World Heavyweight Championship #1 Contender Tournament	Jeff Hardy	October 12	
NWA World Tag Team Championship Tournament	Kid Kash and Dallas	March 31	
2004 TNA World X Cup Tournament	Team TNA	May 26	
2004 TNA America's X Cup Tournament	Team TNA		

==== TNA Year End Awards ====
Poll	Winner(s)
Tag Team of the Year	America's Most Wanted (Chris Harris and James Storm)
Babe of the Year	Traci Brooks
Finisher of the Year	The Canadian Destroyer
Who To Watch in 2005	Héctor Garza
Memorable Moment of the Year	Primetime walks the Six Sides of Steel at Turning Point
X Division Star of the Year	A.J. Styles
Match of the Year	Six Sides of Steel Match: Triple X vs. America's Most Wanted at Turning Point
Mr. TNA	A.J. Styles

=== WWE ===
Accomplishment	Winner	Date won	Notes
Royal Rumble	Chris Benoit	January 25	Winner received their choice of a championship match for either Raw's World Heavyweight Championship or SmackDown!'s WWE Championship at WrestleMania XX. Benoit from SmackDown! last eliminated Big Show to win and chose to challenge for Raw's World Heavyweight Championship, which he subsequently won from Triple H in a triple threat match that also involved Shawn Michaels.

==== WWE Hall of Fame ====
Category	Inductee	Inducted by
Individual	Big John Studd	Big Show
Individual	Don Muraco	Mick Foley
Individual	Greg "The Hammer" Valentine	Jimmy Hart
Individual	Harley Race	Ric Flair
Individual	Jesse "The Body" Ventura	Tyrel Ventura
Individual	Junkyard Dog	Ernie Ladd
Individual	Sgt. Slaughter	Pat Patterson
Individual	Superstar Billy Graham	Triple H
Individual	Tito Santana	Shawn Michaels
Individual	Bobby "The Brain" Heenan	Blackjack Lanza
Celebrity	Pete Rose	Kane

== Awards and honors ==
=== Pro Wrestling Illustrated ===
Category	Winner
PWI Wrestler of the Year	Chris Benoit
PWI Tag Team of the Year	America's Most Wanted (Chris Harris and James Storm)
PWI Match of the Year	Triple H vs. Chris Benoit vs. Shawn Michaels (WrestleMania XX)
PWI Feud of the Year	Triple H vs. Chris Benoit
PWI Most Popular Wrestler of the Year	John Cena
PWI Most Hated Wrestler of the Year	Triple H
PWI Comeback of the Year	Edge
PWI Most Improved Wrestler of the Year	Randy Orton
PWI Most Inspirational Wrestler of the Year	Eddie Guerrero
PWI Rookie of the Year	Monty Brown
PWI Woman of the Year	Victoria
PWI Lifetime Achievement	Pat Patterson

=== Wrestling Observer Newsletter ===
==== Wrestling Observer Newsletter Hall of Fame ====
Inductee
The Undertaker
Bob Backlund
Masahiro Chono
Tarzán López
Kazushi Sakuraba
Último Dragón
Kurt Angle

==== Wrestling Observer Newsletter awards ====
Category	Winner
Wrestler of the Year	Kenta Kobashi
Most Outstanding	no credit
Best Box Office Draw	Kenta Kobashi
Feud of the Year	Chris Benoit vs. Shawn Michaels vs. Triple H
Tag Team of the Year	Kenta and Naomichi Marufuji
Most Improved	Randy Orton
Best on Interviews	Mick Foley

== Title changes ==
=== NJPW ===
IWGP Heavyweight Championship
Incoming champion – Shinsuke Nakamura
Date	Winner	Event/Show	Note(s)
February 5	Vacated	N/A	
February 15	Hiroyoshi Tenzan	Fighting Spirit	
March 12	Kensuke Sasaki	Hyper Battle	
March 28	Bob Sapp	King of Sports	
June 2	Vacated	N/A	
June 5	Kazuyuki Fujita	The Crush II	
October 9	Kensuke Sasaki	Pro Wrestlers Be Strongest	
December 12	Hiroyoshi Tenzan	Battle Final	

IWGP Tag Team Championship
Incoming champions – Hiroshi Tanahashi and Yutaka Yoshie
Date	Winner	Event/Show	Note(s)
February 1	Minoru Suzuki and Yoshihiro Takayama	Fighting Spirit	
November 21	Vacated	N/A	
December 11	Hiroshi Tanahashi and Shinsuke Nakamura	Battle Final	

IWGP Junior Heavyweight Championship
Incoming champion – Heat
Date	Winner	Event/Show	Note(s)
No title changes

IWGP Junior Heavyweight Tag Team Championship
Incoming champions – Gedo and Jado
Date	Winner	Event/Show	Note(s)
March 12	American Dragon and Curry Man	Hyper Battle	
June 5	Gedo and Jado	Best of the Super Jr. XI	

=== WWE ===
– Raw
– SmackDown

Raw and SmackDown each had a world championship, a secondary championship, and a tag team championship for male wrestlers. SmackDown also had a title for their cruiserweight wrestlers. There was only one women's championship and it was exclusive to Raw.

World Heavyweight Championship
Incoming champion – Triple H
Date	Winner	Event/Show	Note(s)
March 14	Chris Benoit	WrestleMania XX	Triple threat match, also involving Shawn Michaels.
August 15	Randy Orton	SummerSlam	
September 12	Triple H	Unforgiven	
December 6	Vacated	Monday Night Raw	The championship was vacated after a double fall occurred in a triple threat match, also involving Chris Benoit and Edge.

WWE Championship
Incoming champion – Brock Lesnar
Date	Winner	Event/Show	Note(s)
February 15	Eddie Guerrero	No Way Out	
June 27	John "Bradshaw" Layfield	The Great American Bash	Texas Bullrope match

WWE Intercontinental Championship
Incoming champion – Randy Orton
Date	Winner	Event/Show	Note(s)
July 11	Edge	Vengeance	
September 6	Vacated	Monday Night Raw	Vacated due to injury.
September 12	Chris Jericho	Unforgiven	Defeated Christian in a ladder match for the vacant title.
October 19	Shelton Benjamin	Taboo Tuesday	Due to the stipulation of the event, fans could vote for who would face Chris Jericho for the title; Benjamin had the most votes.

WWE United States Championship
Incoming champion – Big Show
Date	Winner	Event/Show	Note(s)
March 14	John Cena	WrestleMania XX	
July 6 (aired July 8)	Vacated	SmackDown!	John Cena was stripped of the title after attacking SmackDown! General Manager Kurt Angle.
July 27 (aired July 29)	Booker T	SmackDown!	Eight-way elimination match for the vacant title, also involving John Cena, René Duprée, Kenzo Suzuki, Rob Van Dam, Billy Gunn, Charlie Haas, and Luther Reigns.
October 3	John Cena	No Mercy	Fifth match of a Best of Five series.
October 5 (aired October 7)	Carlito Caribbean Cool	SmackDown!	
November 16 (aired November 18)	John Cena	SmackDown!	

WWE Women's Championship
Incoming champion – Molly Holly
Date	Winner	Event/Show	Note(s)
February 23	Victoria	Monday Night Raw	Fatal four-way elimination match, also involving Jazz and Lita. Victoria pinned Lita to win the championship.
June 13	Trish Stratus	Bad Blood	Fatal four-way match, also involving Lita and Gail Kim. Stratus pinned Lita to win the championship.
December 6	Lita	Monday Night Raw	

World Tag Team Championship
Incoming champions – Evolution (Batista and Ric Flair)
Date	Winner	Event/Show	Note(s)
February 16	Booker T and Rob Van Dam	Monday Night Raw	
March 22	Evolution (Batista and Ric Flair)	Monday Night Raw	
April 19	Chris Benoit and Edge	Monday Night Raw	
May 31	La Résistance (Robért Conway and Sylvain Grenier)	Monday Night Raw	
October 19	Chris Benoit and Edge	Taboo Tuesday	Benoit and Edge were voted into this match as a result of neither winning the World Heavyweight Championship voting. Benoit won the title himself after Edge abandoned him midway through the match.
November 1	La Résistance (Robért Conway and Sylvain Grenier)	Monday Night Raw	
November 15	Eugene and William Regal	Monday Night Raw	Three-way elimination match, also involving Rhyno and Tajiri.

WWE Tag Team Championship
Incoming champions – The Basham Brothers (Doug and Danny Basham)
Date	Winner	Event/Show	Note(s)
February 3 (aired February 5)	Rikishi and Scotty 2 Hotty	SmackDown!	
April 20 (aired April 22)	Charlie Haas and Rico	SmackDown!	
June 15 (aired June 17)	The Dudley Boyz (Bubba Ray and D-Von Dudley)	SmackDown!	
July 6 (aired July 8)	Billy Kidman and Paul London	SmackDown!	
September 7 (aired September 9)	Kenzo Suzuki and René Duprée	SmackDown!	
December 7 (aired December 9)	Rey Mysterio and Rob Van Dam	SmackDown!	

WWE Cruiserweight Championship
Incoming champion – Rey Mysterio
Date	Winner	Event/Show	Note(s)
February 15	Chavo Guerrero Jr.	No Way Out	
May 4 (aired May 6)	Jacqueline	SmackDown!	Only woman under the WWE banner to win the title.
May 16	Chavo Guerrero Jr.	Judgment Day	Guerrero won the title with one hand tied behind his back, though his father Chavo Classic untied it during the match.
May 18 (aired May 20)	Chavo Classic	SmackDown!	Triple threat match, also involving Spike Dudley.
June 15 (aired June 17)	Rey Mysterio	SmackDown!	
July 27 (aired July 29)	Spike Dudley	SmackDown!	
December 12	Funaki	Armageddon	

== Debuts ==
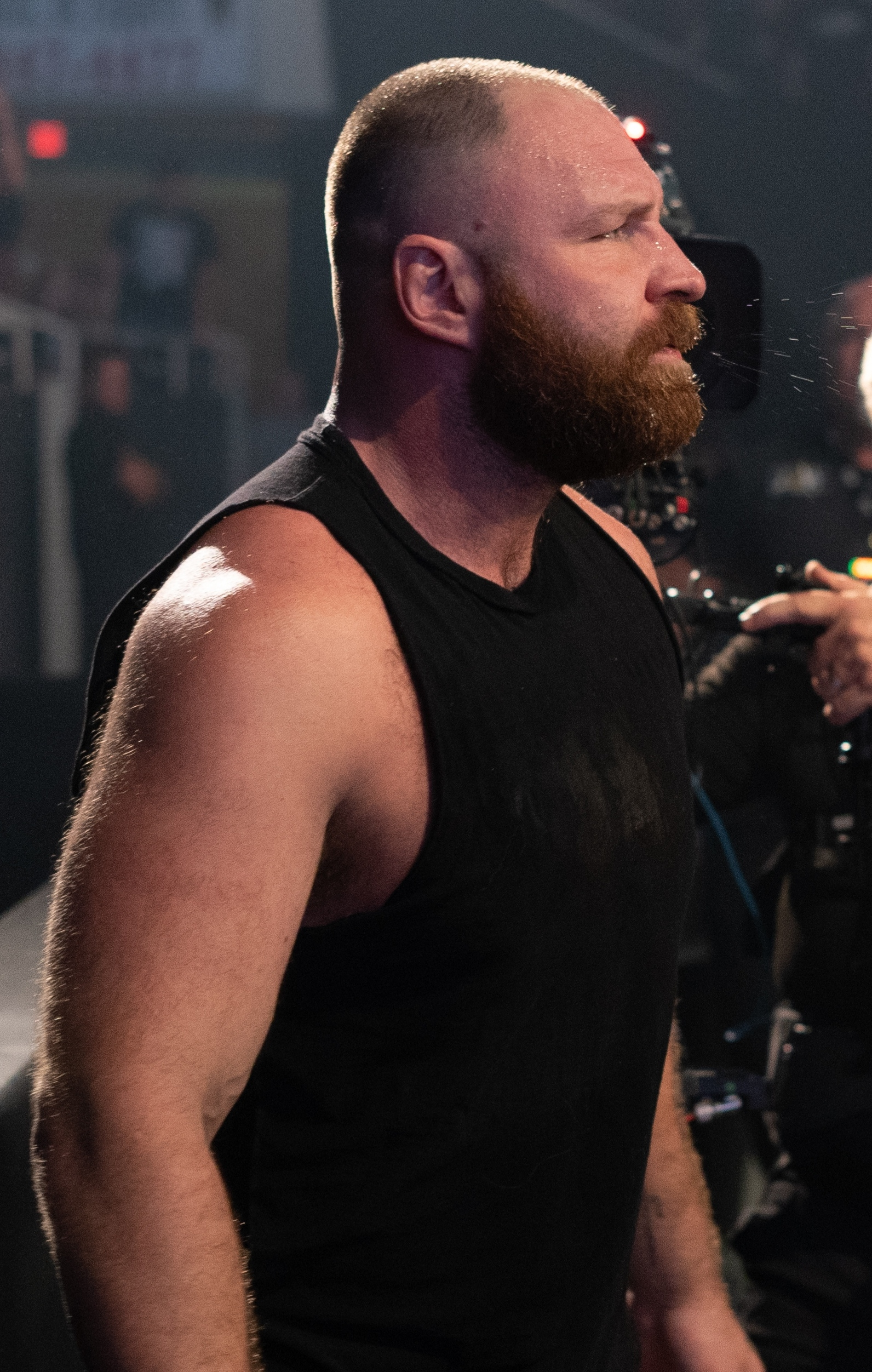
Jon Moxley

- Uncertain debut date

- Christy Hemme
- Davey Richards
- Maria Kanellis
- Mecha Wolf 450
- Carmella DeCesare

- January 3 – Natsuki Taiyo
- January 5 – Katsuhiko Nakajima
- March 7 – Kenta Kosugi
- March 13 – Orange Cassidy
- March 21 – Saburo Inematsu
- March 27 – Pac (wrestler)
- April 17 – Paul Robinson
- April 20 – Zack Sabre Jr.
- May 23 – Lucky 13
- June 6 – Shinobu
- June 13 – Michael Dante
- June 16 – Asuka and Cherry
- June 20 – Jon Moxley
- July 1 – Kota Ibushi
- July 3 - Alisha Edwards
- July 4 – Q. T. Marshall
- July 10 – Trent Beretta
- July 26 – Yujiro Takahashi
- August 8 – The Young Bucks
- August 13 – Dax Harwood
- August 14 – Matt Cardona
- August 21 – Seth Rollins and Joaquin Wilde
- August 29 – Kazuchika Okada
- October 13 – Choun Shiryu
- November 3 – Shoichi Uchida and Nic Nemeth
- November 7 – Daisuke Masaoka
- November 15 – Candice Michelle
- November 18 – Michelle McCool
- December 4 – Guts Ishijima

== Retirements ==
- Randy Savage (1973–December 5, 2004)
- Ángel Acevedo (1973-2004, returned for one match in 2017)
- Timothy Well (1987–2004)
- Dances With Dudley (1992-2004)
- Carmella DeCesare (October–November 2004)
- Shaniqua (2002–February 2004)
- Ron Simmons (1986-March 2004) (returned to wrestling in 2006 and retired in 2012)
- John Tenta (1987-2004)
- Terri Runnels (1990 – April 2004)
- Sable (1996 – August 10, 2004)
- The Fabulous Moolah (1949–September 21, 2004)

== Births ==
- April 19 – Yuna
- April 29 - Je'Von Evans
- August 11 – Hanan
- August 16 – Ruaka
- August 30 – Homare
- September 27 – Leon Slater
- December 3 – Kizuna Tanaka
- December 8 – Billie Starkz
- December 12 - Anya Rune
- December 14 – Ricky Sosa

== Deaths ==
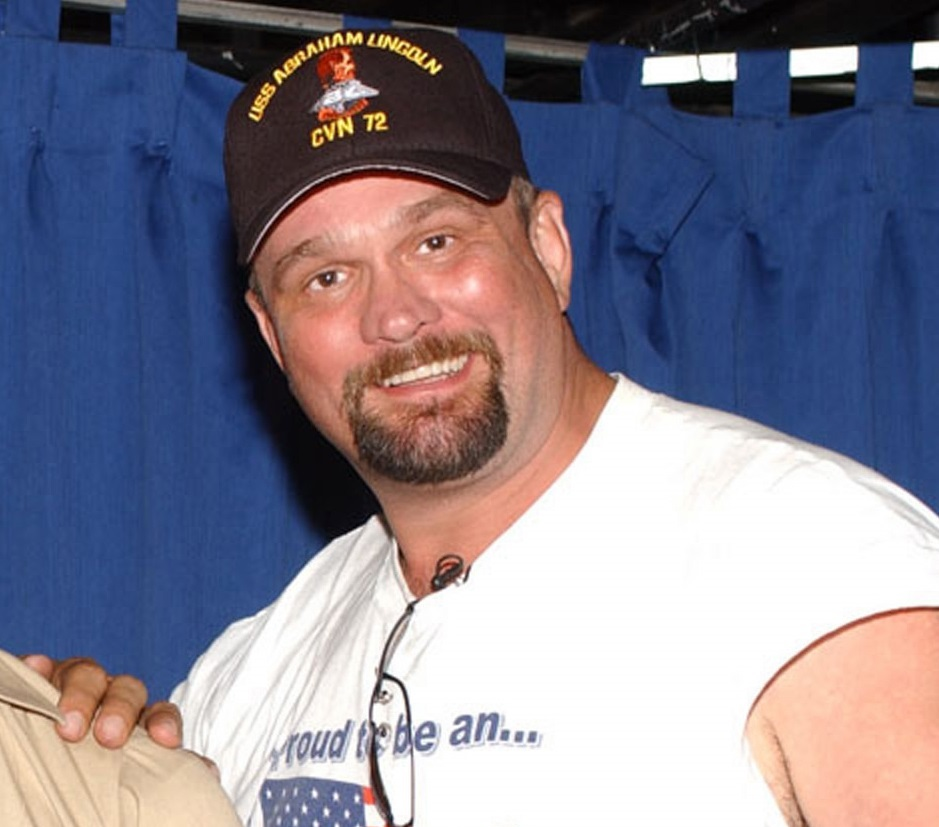
Big Boss Man

- January 24 – Jack Tunney, 69
- January 27 - Hard Boiled Haggerty, 78
- March 6 – Hercules, 47
- March 11 - Michael Okpala, 64
- May 6 - Pepper Gomez, 77
- May 18 - Sambo Asako, 40
- June 1 – James Dudley, 94
- August 25 - Dave Levin, 91
- September 12 - Dr. Wagner, 68
- September 18 - Jim Barnett, 80
- September 22 – Big Boss Man, 41
- September 26 – Marianna Komlos, 35
- November 27 - Jack Donovan (wrestler), 76

== See also ==
- List of WWE pay-per-view events
- List of TNA pay-per-view events
