= List of ROH Pure Champions =

Listing of professional wrestling champions for the ROH Pure Championship

The ROH Pure Championship is a professional wrestling championship contested for in the American professional wrestling promotion Ring of Honor (ROH). The championship is generally contested in professional wrestling matches, in which participants execute scripted finishes rather than contend in direct competition.

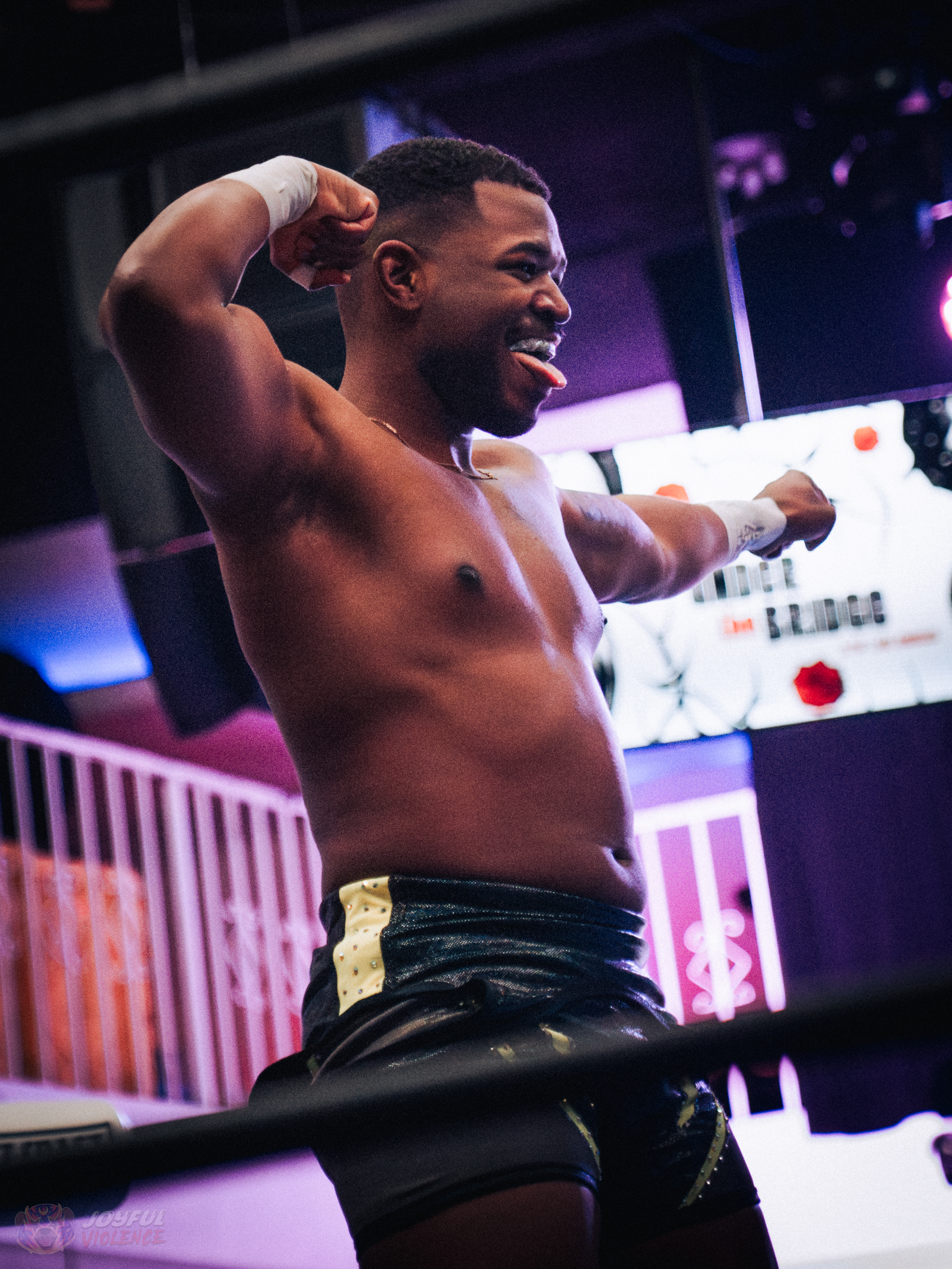
Current and longest reigning champion Lee Moriarty

Overall, there have been 15 championship reigns between 13 different champions. The title has been vacated once. A.J. Styles was the inaugural champion, while Jonathan Gresham was the first champion upon the title's revival. Wheeler Yuta is the only champion to have more than one reign with the title, with three reigns. Lee Moriarty has the longest reign at 840+ days with a record-21 title defenses. Bryan Danielson had the shortest reign at less than a day since the title was decommissioned after being unified with the ROH World Championship.

Lee Moriarty is the current champion in his first reign. He defeated Wheeler Yuta at Death Before Dishonor on July 26, 2024, in Arlington, Texas.

== Reigns ==
=== Names ===
Name	Years
ROH Pure Wrestling Championship	2004
ROH Pure Championship	2004 – 2006; 2020 – present

Key
No.	Overall reign number
Reign	Reign number for the specific champion
Days	Number of days held
Defenses	Number of successful defenses
<1	Reign lasted less than a day
+	Current reign is changing daily

No.	Champion	Championship change			Reign statistics			Notes	Ref.
No.	Champion	Date	Event	Location	Reign	Days	Defenses	Notes	Ref.
Ring of Honor (ROH)
1	A.J Styles	February 14, 2004	Second Anniversary Show	Braintree, MA	1	70	1	Defeated CM Punk in the ROH Pure Championship tournament finals to become the inaugural champion.	
—	Vacated	April 24, 2004	—	—	—	—	—	Vacated when Styles was pulled from all ROH shows by Total Nonstop Action Wrestling following the Rob Feinstein controversy.	
2	Doug Williams	July 17, 2004	Reborn: Completion	Elizabeth, NJ	1	42	3	Defeated Alex Shelley in a tournament final.	
3	John Walters	August 28, 2004	Scramble Cage Melee	Elizabeth, NJ	1	189	6		
4	Jay Lethal	March 5, 2005	Trios Tournament 2005	Philadelphia, PA	1	63	2		
5	Samoa Joe	May 7, 2005	Manhattan Mayhem I	New York, NY	1	112	6		
6	Nigel McGuinness	August 27, 2005	Dragon Gate Invasion	Buffalo, NY	1	350	17		
7	Bryan Danielson	August 12, 2006	Unified	Liverpool, England	1	<1	0	This was a title unification match with Danielson's ROH World Championship on the line.	
—	Unified	August 12, 2006	Unified	Liverpool, England	—	—	—	Title was deactivated sometime after it unified with the ROH World Championship.	
8	Jonathan Gresham	October 30, 2020	Ring of Honor Wrestling	Baltimore, MD	1	317	7	Defeated Tracy Williams in the final of a tournament to crown a new champion for the revived title.	
9	Josh Woods	September 12, 2021	Death Before Dishonor XVIII	Philadelphia, PA	1	201	5	During this reign, Tony Khan purchased Ring of Honor.	
10	Wheeler Yuta	April 1, 2022	Supercard of Honor XV	Garland, TX	1	159	3		
11	Daniel Garcia	September 7, 2022	Dynamite	Buffalo, NY	1	94	2	This was an All Elite Wrestling event.	
12	Wheeler Yuta	December 10, 2022	Final Battle	Arlington, TX	2	111	4		
13	Katsuyori Shibata	March 31, 2023	Supercard of Honor	Los Angeles, CA	1	239	5		
14	Wheeler Yuta	November 25, 2023	Rampage	Pittsburgh, PA	3	244	3	This was an All Elite Wrestling event.	
15	Lee Moriarty	July 26, 2024	Death Before Dishonor	Arlington, TX	1	840+	21		

== Combined reigns ==
As of November 13, 2026.

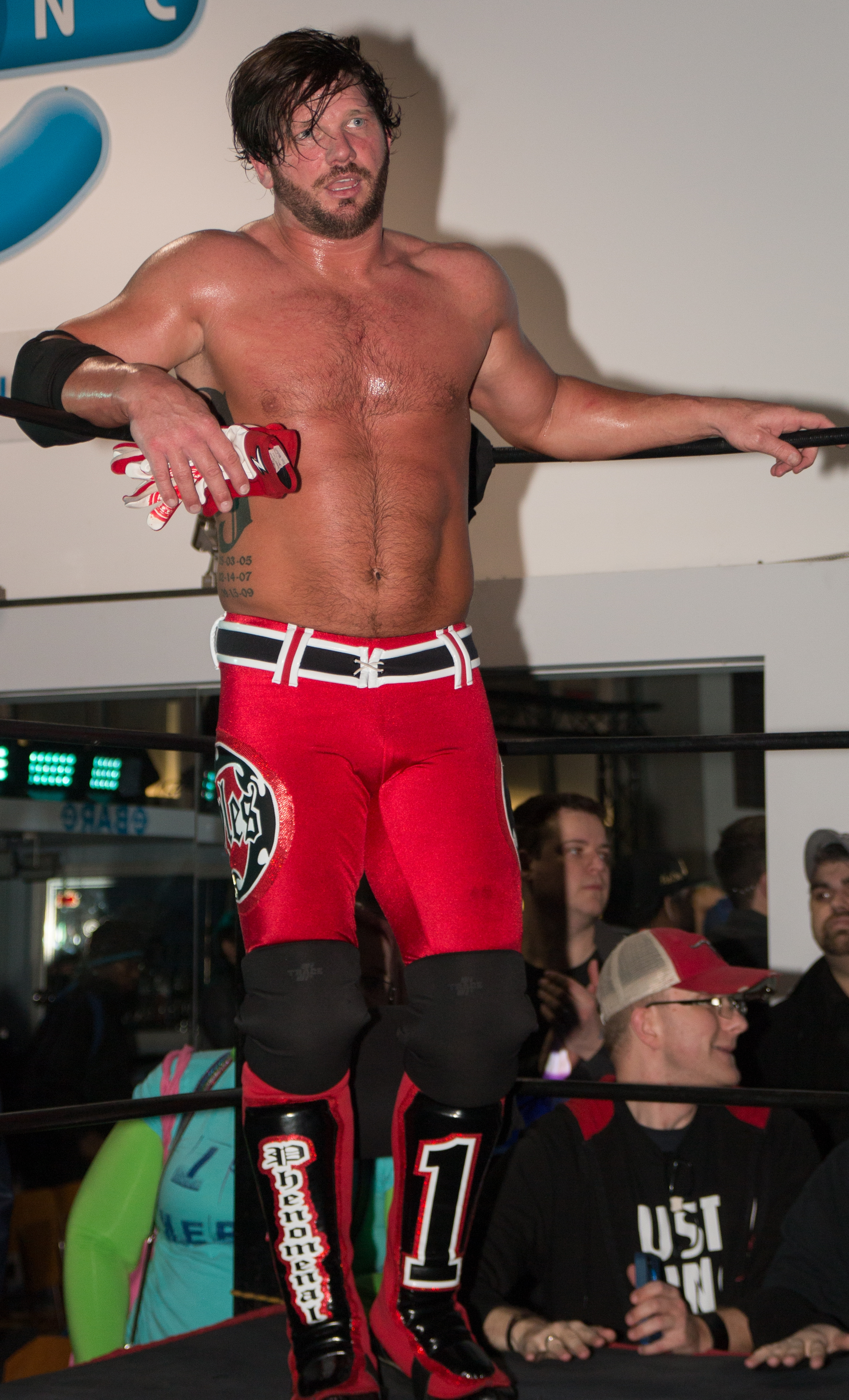
The inaugural champion AJ Styles.

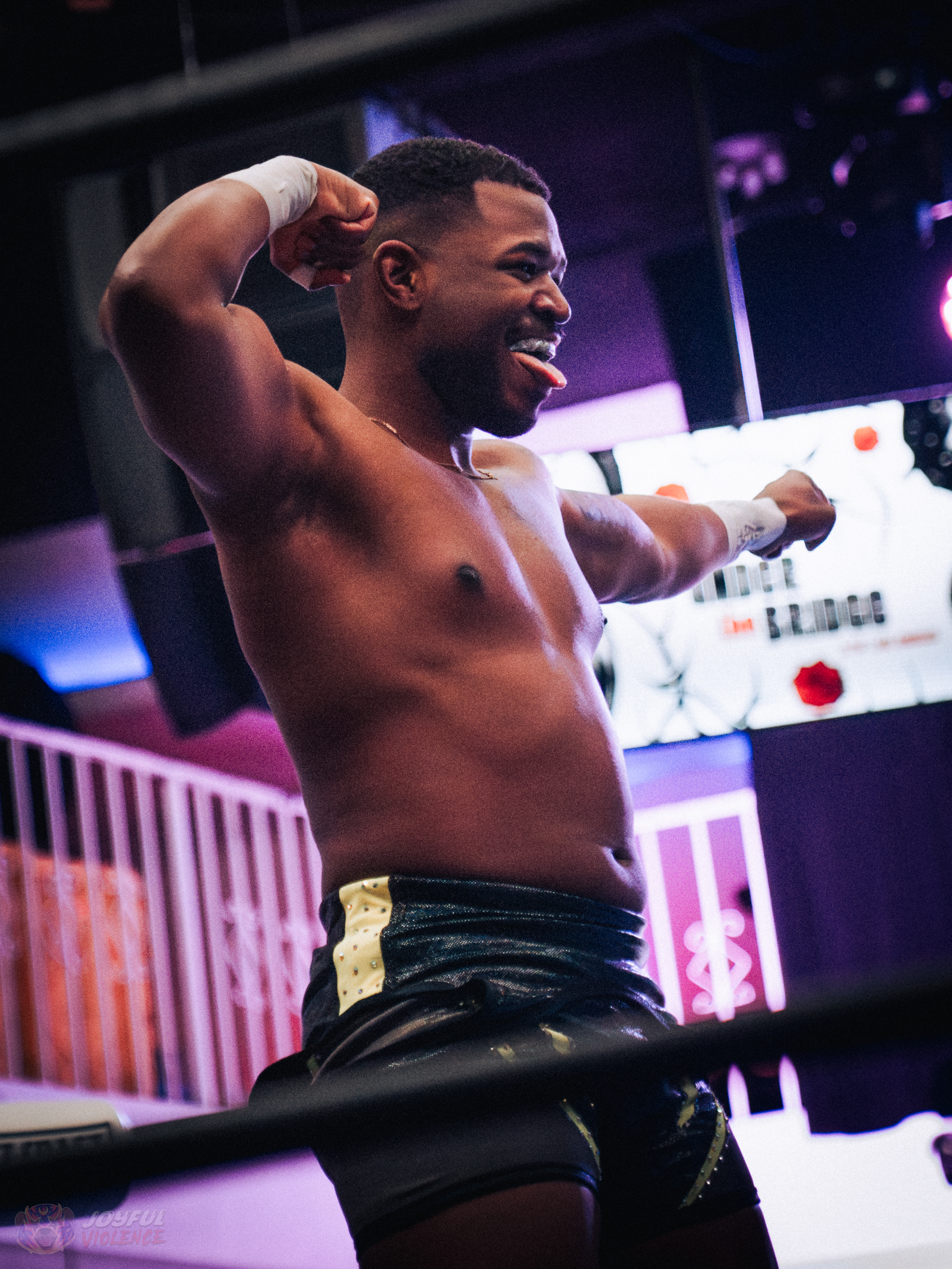
Champion with the most title defenses and longest-reign Lee Moriarty.

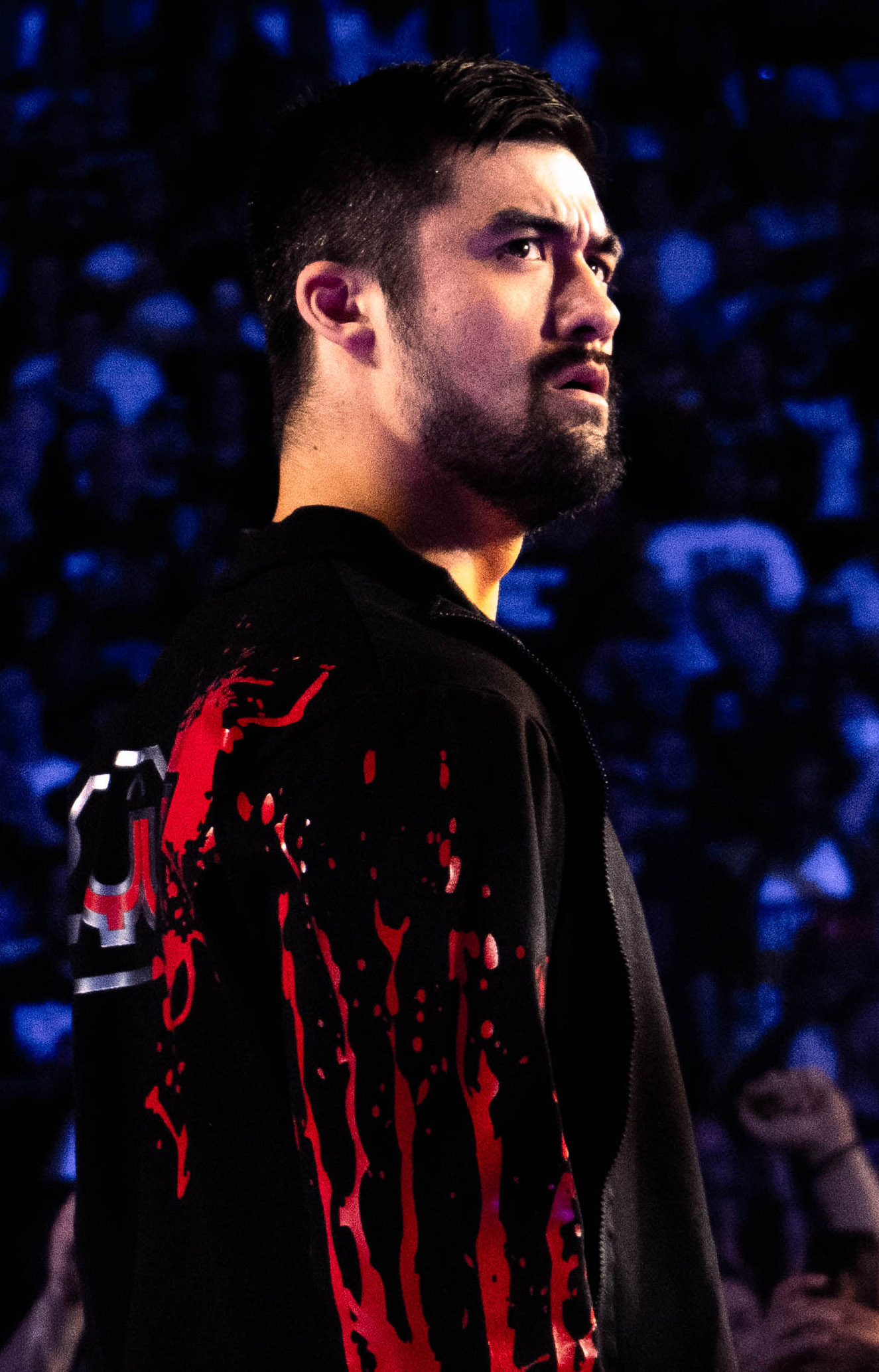
Record-setting three-time champion Wheeler Yuta.

†	Indicates the current champion

Rank	Wrestler	No. of reigns	Combined defenses	Combined days
1	Lee Moriarty †	1	21	840+
2	Wheeler Yuta	3	10	514
3	Nigel McGuinness	1	17	350
4	Jonathan Gresham	1	7	317
5	Katsuyori Shibata	1	5	239
6	Josh Woods	1	5	201
7	John Walters	1	6	189
8	Samoa Joe	1	6	112
9	Daniel Garcia	1	2	94
10	A.J. Styles	1	1	70
11	Jay Lethal	1	2	63
12	Doug Williams	1	3	42
13	Bryan Danielson	1	0	<1
