= Lee Moriarty =

American professional wrestler

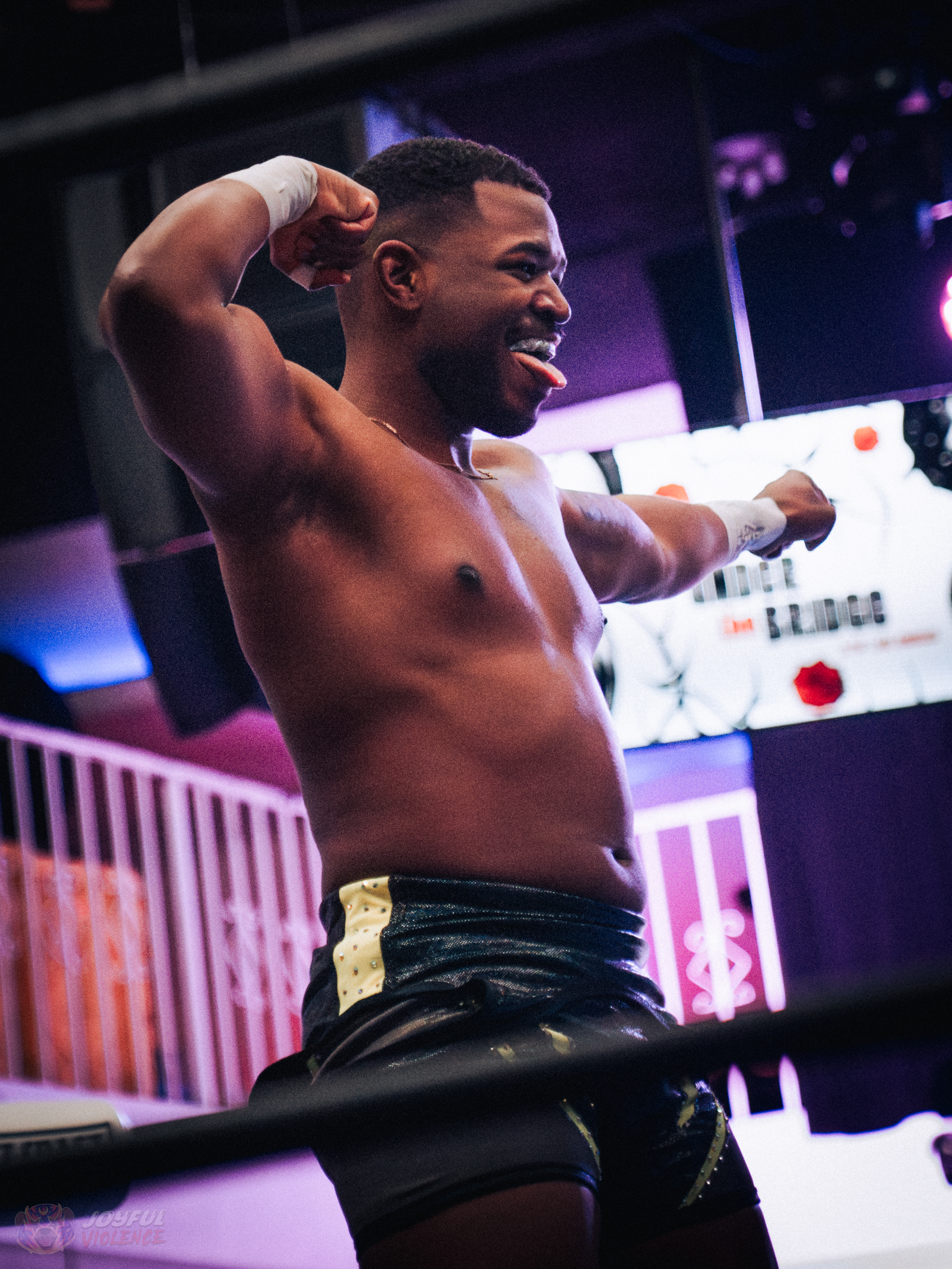
- Moriarty in February 2024

Personal information
- Born: Julian Lee Moriarty; June 6, 1994 (age 32) Pittsburgh, Pennsylvania, U.S.

Professional wrestling career
- Ring name(s): Genkai; Lee Mitchell; Lee Moriarty
- Billed height: 5 ft 11 in (180 cm)
- Billed weight: 185 lb (84 kg)
- Billed from: Pittsburgh, Pennsylvania
- Trained by: Brandon K Dean Radford
- Debut: December 9, 2015

Julian Lee Moriarty (born June 6, 1994) is an American professional wrestler and artist. He is signed to All Elite Wrestling (AEW), where he performs under the ring name Lee Moriarty and is a member of Shane Taylor Promotions. He also performs for its sister promotion Ring of Honor (ROH), where he is the current and longest-reigning ROH Pure Champion in his first reign.

== Professional wrestling career ==
=== Early years (2015–2021) ===
Lee Moriarty began training professional wrestling in February 2015 under Brandon K and Dean Radford in Pro Wrestling eXpress (PWX) near his home city of Pittsburgh. He made his debut within the same year.

=== All Elite Wrestling / Ring of Honor (2021–present) ===
==== Early beginnings (2021–2023) ====
In August 2021, Moriarty was booked to his first match in All Elite Wrestling (AEW) for a taped episode of AEW Dark. He signed with the promotion two months later. After signing, Moriarty aligned with Matt Sydal, competing in various tag matches. In the lead-up to All Out 2022, Moriarty turned heel and was recruited by Stokely Hathaway along with Ethan Page, Colten Gunn, Austin Gunn, and W. Morrissey. On the September 14 episode of AEW Dynamite, the name of his group was revealed to be "The Firm" and that they were MJF's "retainer team" helping him whenever he would need them. In early 2023, The Firm quietly disbanded.

==== Shane Taylor Promotions (2023–present) ====
In September 2023, Moriaty joined forces with Shane Taylor to reform Taylor's old stable "Shane Taylor Promotions". On July 26, 2024 at Death Before Dishonor, Moriarty defeated Wheeler Yuta to win the ROH Pure Championship for the first time. On December 20 at Final Battle, Moriarty successfully defended his title against Nigel McGuinness in an open challenge.

On July 11, 2025 at Supercard of Honor, Moriarty successfully defended his title against Blue Panther. On August 29 at Death Before Dishonor, Moriarty successfully defended his title against Xelhua. At Final Battle in December 2025, Moriarty successfully defended his title against Nigel McGuinness in 30-minute Iron man match in sudden death overtime 5-4.

Moriarty would continue his reign in 2026, successfully defending his title at Supercard of Honor on May 1 against Ace Austin and at Death Before Dishonor on August 21 against Katsuyori Shibata.

== Personal life ==
Moriarty is an accomplished graphic artist and painter. He made his public debut as a visual artist at NADA Miami 2024, with a presentation made in collaboration with annually-published art/wrestling journal Orange Crush. He sold all 8 of the paintings he showcased, one of which was bought by the Pérez Art Museum Miami, marking Moriarty as the first active professional wrestler to have an art piece hosted in a major museum’s permanent collection. Between September 27 & October 18, 2025, Moriarty's art was presented in his first solo gallery exhibition - titled "Balance" - at the Night Gallery in Los Angeles.

== Championships and accomplishments ==
- Daily Wrestling
  - Match Madness (2021)
- Enjoy Wrestling
  - Enjoy Cup Championship (1 time, inaugural)
  - Enjoy Cup Championship Tournament (2021)
- IndependentWrestling.TV
  - IWTV Independent Wrestling Championship (1 time)
  - The Masked Wrestler Tournament (2020)
- Lucha Memes
  - Battle of Coacalco (2021)
- Pro Wrestling eXpress
  - PWX Heavyweight Championship (1 time)
  - PWX Three Rivers Championship (2 times)
  - PWX Tag Team Championship (1 time) - with (Crusher Hansen, Samuel Adams, Dirk Ciglar, and Gannon Jones Jr.)
  - 10th Annual Shawn 'Shocker' Evans Memorial Tournament (2017)
  - PWX Heavyweight Championship Tournament (2016)
- Pro Wrestling Illustrated
  - Ranked No. 35 of the top 500 singles wrestlers in the PWI 500 in 2026
- Quaker City Wrestling
  - QCW Heavyweight Championship (1 time)
- Ring of Honor
  - ROH Pure Championship (1 time, current)
- Ryse Wrestling
  - Ryse Grand Championship (1 time)
- Independent Wrestling Expo
  - One Night Tournament (2021)
