= ROH 2nd Anniversary Show =

2004 Ring of Honor event

- Promotion: Ring of Honor
- Date: February 14, 2004
- City: Braintree, Massachusetts
- Venue: National Guard Armory
- Attendance: 600

ROH Anniversary Show chronology
← Previous; One Year Anniversary	Next → Third Anniversary

Event chronology
← Previous; The Last Stand	Next → At Our Best

ROH 2nd Anniversary Show was the second ROH Anniversary Show professional wrestling event produced by Ring of Honor (ROH). It took place on February 14, 2004, at the National Guard Armory in Braintree, Massachusetts.

The show featured a tournament to crown the inaugural Pure Wrestling Champion, with A.J. Styles defeating CM Punk in the tournament final to become the first Pure Wrestling Champion. Apart from the tournament, Samoa Joe retained the ROH World Championship against B. J. Whitmer, Dan Maff and Low Ki in a Four Corner Survival match, The Briscoe Brothers (Jay Briscoe and Mark Briscoe) retained the ROH Tag Team Championship against The Backseat Boyz (Johnny Kashmere and Trent Acid) and Special K (Dixie, Hydro and Izzy) defeated The Carnage Crew (DeVito, Justin Credible and Loc) in a Country Whipping match.

== Storylines ==
The event largely revolved around the new Pure Wrestling Championship which was introduced in late 2003 as the successor to the Field of Honor Tournament which culminated at Final Battle won by Matt Stryker. The title featured the pure wrestling rules which included total three rope breaks in a match, closed-fist punches to the face were prohibited and the referee would count to 20 instead of 10 if a wrestler went outside the ring. The first pure wrestling match in ROH took place at The Battle Lines Are Drawn, where Stryker defeated Alex Shelley. At The Last Stand, R. J. Brewer defeated Chad Collyer in a pure wrestling match to qualify for the Pure Wrestling Tournament.

At The Last Stand, Dan Maff and B. J. Whitmer defeated Matt Stryker and Xavier in a Four Corner Survival match to win the ROH World Championship #1 Contender's Trophy, thus setting up a three-way match against Samoa Joe for the World Championship at 2nd Anniversary Show.

At Wrestlerave '03 on June 28, 2003, The Carnage Crew (DeVito, Justin Credible and Loc) defeated Special K (Deranged, Dixie and Izzy) in a six-man tag team match, beginning a lengthy feud between the two teams. The two teams traded wins in a series of matches throughout the year, setting up a Country Whipping match between the two teams at 2nd Anniversary Show.

== Event ==
=== Quarterfinals ===
The event kicked off with the quarterfinals of a tournament for the new Pure Wrestling Championship. R. J. Brewer faced CM Punk in the first match. Walters delivered a Hurricane DDT to Punk and covered him for the pinfall but Punk put his foot on the rope. Walter then rolled up Punk, who reversed it to pin Walter for the win.

Next, Chris Sabin faced Doug Williams in the second quarter-final match. Sabin managed to hit a Cradle Shock on Williams but got a near-fall and then Williams delivered a Chaos Theory to Sabin's injured neck for the win.

Next, Matt Stryker defeated Josh Daniels by making him submit to the Stryker Lock for the win.

The last quarter-final match featured A.J. Styles competing against Jimmy Rave. Styles injured his knee while executing a Stylin' DDT. Rave dropkicked Styles in the knee and hit a dragon screw legwhip. Rave then ran to attack Styles but Styles hit a discus clothesline for the win.

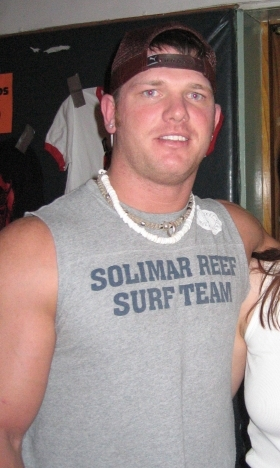
A.J. Styles was crowned the inaugural Pure Wrestling Champion at 2nd Anniversary Show.

Next, Special K (Dixie, Hydro and Izzy) took on The Carnage Crew (DeVito, Justin Credible and Loc) in a Country Whipping match. Credible delivered a That's Incredible to Izzy and then Angel Dust brought out DeVito's daughter to distract him, which led to DeVito and Credible rushing to the backstage to save her leaving Loc alone against Special K. Loc was then hit with a spike piledriver on a table outside the ring and Izzy pinned him for the win.

=== Semifinals ===
The semi-final round of the Pure Wrestling Championship tournament started as Doug Williams took on CM Punk. Williams was tied into the corner in a tree of woe by Punk, who hit a shoulder block in Williams' knee and proceeded to hit another but Williams reversed it into Chaos Theory but his shoulder were also down on the mat and Punk put his shoulder up on the two-count for the win.

In the next semi-final match, A.J. Styles took on Matt Stryker. Styles delivered a Superman to Stryker to advance to the final round.

Next, The Briscoe Brothers (Jay Briscoe and Mark Briscoe) defended the ROH Tag Team Championship against The Backseat Boyz (Johnny Kashmere and Trent Acid). Mark knocked out Acid with a tornado DDT from the top rope onto a table outside the ring. Briscoes hit a Spike Jay-Driller to Kashmere to retain the titles.

In the penultimate match, Samoa Joe defended the ROH World Championship against B. J. Whitmer, Dan Maff and Low Ki. Maff and Ki fell out of the ring when Maff hit a spear to Ki and Joe applied a Coquina Clutch on Whitmer to retain the title.

=== Final ===
A.J. Styles faced CM Punk in the Pure Wrestling Championship tournament final. Punk attempted to execute a Pepsi Plunge on Styles but Styles countered with a backflip kick and delivered a Styles Clash to Punk from the top rope to win the tournament and become the inaugural Pure Wrestling Champion.

== Aftermath ==
AJ Styles defended the Pure Wrestling Championship against CM Punk in the main event of ROH's next show At Our Best with Ricky Steamboat serving as the special guest referee. Styles retained the title. However, it would mark Styles' last appearance in ROH for one year as Styles' home promotion Total Nonstop Action Wrestling severed its ties with ROH due to the Rob Feinstein controversy and barred its contracted wrestlers from appearing in ROH. This resulted in Styles vacating the Pure Wrestling Championship on April 24 and a tournament was set up to determine the new champion at Reborn: Completion on July 17.

The feud continued between Special K and Carnage Crew as the two teams competed in a Scramble match at At Our Best, which Carnage Crew won to end the rivalry.

== Results ==
No.	Results	Stipulations	Times
1	CM Punk defeated R. J. Brewer	Quarter-final tournament match	13:01
2	Doug Williams defeated Chris Sabin	Quarter-final tournament match	8:18
3	Matt Stryker defeated Josh Daniels	Quarter-final tournament match	8:29
4	A.J. Styles defeated Jimmy Rave	Quarter-final tournament match	7:35
5	Special K (Dixie, Hydro and Izzy) defeated The Carnage Crew (DeVito, Justin Credible and Loc)	Country Whipping match	8:46
6	CM Punk defeated Doug Williams	Semi-final tournament match	10:44
7	A.J. Styles defeated Matt Stryker	Semi-final tournament match	20:46
8	The Briscoe Brothers (Jay Briscoe and Mark Briscoe) (c) defeated The Backseat Boyz (Johnny Kashmere and Trent Acid)	Tag team match for the ROH Tag Team Championship	8:00
9	Samoa Joe (c) defeated B. J. Whitmer, Dan Maff and Low Ki	Four Corner Survival match for the ROH World Championship	23:01
10	A.J. Styles defeated CM Punk	Tournament final for the inaugural ROH Pure Wrestling Championship	16:37
(c) / – the champion(s) heading into the match

=== Tournament bracket ===
Quarterfinals; ROH Wrestling tapings
A.J. Styles	7:35
Jimmy Rave	Pin
Matt Stryker	Sub
Josh Daniels	8:29
CM Punk	Pin
R. J. Brewer	13:01
Chris Sabin	8:18
Doug Williams	Pin

Semifinals; ROH Wrestling tapings
A.J. Styles	Pin
Matt Stryker	20:46
CM Punk	Sub
Doug Williams	10:44

Finals; ROH 2nd Anniversary Show; February 14, 2004
A.J. Styles	16:37
CM Punk	Pin

== See also ==
- 2004 in professional wrestling
- List of Ring of Honor pay-per-view events
