= List of Ring of Honor tournaments =

Ring of Honor (ROH) has held a variety of professional wrestling tournaments competed for by wrestlers that are a part of their personnel.

== ROH Championship Tournament (2002) ==
On June 22, 2002, Ring of Honor held an ROH Championship tournament to crown the inaugural ROH Champion. The Finals of the tournament was a four way iron man match that took place July 27, 2002. During that date Low Ki won and became the inaugural champion.

== ROH Tag Team Championship Tournament (2002) ==
On September 21, 2002, Ring of Honor held an ROH Tag Team Championship tournament to crown the inaugural ROH Tag Team Champions. During that date The Prophecy (Christopher Daniels and Donovan Morgan) won to become the inaugural champions.

== Field of Honor (2003) ==
The Field of Honor was a professional wrestling tournament held from September 6, 2003 until December 27, 2003 by the Ring of Honor promotion. It was held as a round-robin, with winners from two blocks wrestling in the final to decide that winner. The winner of each block is determined by a points system; one point for a victory, one point for a draw, and zero points for a loss.

No.	Block A
1.	Matt Stryker [1] defeated R. J. Brewer [0]
2.	Xavier [1] defeated John Walters [0]
3.	Matt Stryker [2] defeated Chris Sabin [0]
4.	Xavier [2] defeated Chris Sabin [0]
5.	Matt Stryker [3] defeated Xavier [2]

No.	Block B
1.	Colt Cabana [1] defeated Jimmy Rave [0]
2.	B. J. Whitmer [1] defeated Jimmy Rave [0]
3.	Dan Maff [1] defeated Jimmy Rave [0]
4.	Colt Cabana [2] defeated B. J. Whitmer [1]
5.	B. J. Whitmer [2] defeated Dan Maff [1]
6.	Dan Maff [2] defeated Colt Cabana [2]
7.	B. J. Whitmer [3] defeated Colt Cabana [2] and Dan Maff [2]

Final
A1	Matt Stryker	Pin
B1	B. J. Whitmer	18:08

== ROH Pure Wrestling Championship Tournament (2004) ==
On February 14, 2004, Ring of Honor held a tournament for the ROH Pure Wrestling Championship to crown the inaugural champion at Second Anniversary Show. During this event A.J. Styles won to become the inaugural champion.

== ROH Pure Championship Vacancy Tournament (2004) ==
On July 17, 2004, Ring of Honor held a tournament for the vacant ROH Pure Championship.

Semifinals
1	Alex Shelley
4	Austin Aries, CM Punk and Matt Stryker	Pin
3	Doug Williams
2	Jay Lethal, R. J. Brewer and Nigel McGuinness	Pin

Final
Alex Shelley	Pin
Doug Williams

== Best of the American Super Juniors Tournament (2005) ==
On April 2, 2005, Ring of Honor held a tournament to crown the best American Super Junior in ROH.

Quarterfinals
James Gibson	14:17
Roderick Strong	Pin
Dragon Soldier B	Pin
Matt Sydal	7:46
Bryan Danielson	Sub
Spanky	23:59
Black Tiger	10:11
Alex Shelley	Pin

Semifinals
James Gibson	Sub
Dragon Soldier B	11:02
Bryan Danielson	Sub
Black Tiger	14:22

Finals
Dragon Soldier B	12:11
Black Tiger	Pin

== Race To The Top Tournament (2007) ==
On July 27, 2007, Ring of Honor held a tournament to determine a number one contender for the ROH World Championship. The Finals of the tournament took place July 28, 2007.

First round
Jack Evans	9:18
Kevin Steen	Pin
Brent Albright	Pin
Matt Cross	5:24
El Generico	Pin
Delirious	11:19
Chris Hero	Pin
Erick Stevens	14:55
Davey Richards	7:29
Jigsaw	Pin
Pelle Primeau	3:37
B. J. Whitmer	Pin
Mike Quackenbush	Pin
Matt Sydal	14:12
Claudio Castagnoli	Pin
Hallowicked	7:02

Quarterfinals
Jack Evans	Pin
Brent Albright	9:44
El Generico	10:48
Chris Hero	Pin
Davey Richards	4:24
Pelle Primeau	Pin
Mike Quackenbush	12:27
Claudio Castagnoli	Pin

Semifinals
Jack Evans	Pin
Claudio Castagnoli	9:09
El Generico	Pin
Davey Richards	12:17

Finals
Claudio Castagnoli	18:47
El Generico	Pin

== ROH World Championship No. 1 Contender Tournament (February 2008) ==
On February 22, 2008, Ring of Honor held a tournament to crown a number one contender for the ROH World Championship.

Quarterfinals
Kevin Steen	9:50
Delirious	Pin
Bryan Danielson	10:55
Rocky Romero	Pin
El Generico	12:50
Austin Aries	Pin
Go Shiozaki	9:23
Necro Butcher	Sub

Semifinals
Kevin Steen	Pin
Bryan Danielson	14:42
El Generico	Sub
Go Shiozaki	13:31

Finals
Kevin Steen	15:27
Go Shiozaki	Pin

== ROH World Championship No. 1 Contender Tournament (March 2008) ==
On March 14, 2008, Ring of Honor held a tournament to crown a number one contender for the ROH World Championship. The Finals of the tournament took place March 16, 2008 it was a four corner survival match.

Qualifiers
Delirious	7:45
Necro Butcher	Pin
Go Shiozaki	14:09
Brent Albright	Sub
Tyler Black	12:50
Erick Stevens	Pin
Claudio Castagnoli	8:18
Davey Richards	Pin

Qualified
Delirious
Go Shiozaki
Tyler Black
Claudio Castagnoli

Finals
Delirious, Go Shiozaki and Claudio Castagnoli	9:31
Tyler Black	Pin

== ROH World Tag Team Championship Tournament (2008) ==
On June 6, 2008, Ring of Honor held an ROH World Tag Team Championship tournament for the vacant ROH World Tag Team Championships.

Teams:

- The Age of the Fall (Tyler Black and Jimmy Jacobs)
- Delirious and Pelle Primeau
- Sweet 'n' Sour Inc. (Adam Pearce and Chris Hero)
- The Vulture Squad (Jigsaw and Ruckus)
- El Generico and Kevin Steen
- Go Shiozaki and Nigel McGuinness
- Austin Aries and Bryan Danielson
- No Remorse Corps (Davey Richards and Roderick Strong)

Quarterfinals
Age of the Fall	7:57
Delirious/Primeau	Pin
Aries/Danielson	19:22
No Remorse Corps	Pin
Sweet 'n' Sour Inc.	12:04
Vulture Squad	Sub
Generico/Steen	19:26
Shiozaki/McGuinness	Pin

Semifinals
Age of the Fall	0:59
Aries/Danielson	DQ
Sweet 'n' Sour Inc.	8:14
Generico/Steen	Pin

Finals
Age of the Fall	16:53
Generico/Steen	Pin

== ROH World Television Championship Tournament (2010) ==
On February 5, 2010, Ring of Honor held a tournament to crown the inaugural ROH World Television Championship. The Finals of the tournament took place on March 5, 2010

== ROH World Tag Team Championship No. 1 Contender Lottery Tournament (2011) ==
On July 8, 2011, Ring of Honor held a number one contenders tournament for the ROH World Tag Team Championship.

Teams:

- The Bravado Brothers (Harlem and Lance Bravado)
- The Briscoe Brothers (Jay and Mark Briscoe)
- Adam Cole and Kyle O'Reilly
- Caprice Coleman and Cedric Alexander

Semifinals
1	Briscoe Brothers
4	Bravado Brothers	Pin
3	Cole/O'Reilly
2	Coleman/Alexander	Pin

Final
Bravado Brothers	Pin
Cole/O'Reilly

== Rise and Prove Tournament (2012) ==
On February 17, 2012, Ring of Honor held the Rise and Prove tournament for up and coming wrestlers.

Teams:

- TMDK (Mikey Nicholls and Shane Haste)
- Alabama Attitude (Corey Hollis and Mike Posey)
- Rudy Switchblade and Shiloh Jonze
- Chris Silvio and Sean Casey

Semifinals
1	TMDK
4	Alabama Attitude	Pin
3	Switchblade/Jonze
2	Silvio/Casey	Pin

Final
TMDK
Switchblade/Jonze	Pin

== March Mayhem Tournament (2012) ==
On March 3, 2012, Ring of Honor held a tournament the March Mayhem tournament.

No.	Results	Stipulations	Times
1	Tommaso Ciampa defeated Kyle O'Reilly	Qualifying match	7:47
2	Michael Bennett defeated Eddie Edwards	Qualifying match	14:10
3	Adam Cole defeated Michael Elgin	Qualifying match	12:21
4	Jay Lethal defeated Roderick Strong	Qualifying match	15:37
5	Tommaso Ciampa defeated Adam Cole, Jay Lethal and Michael Bennett	Four Way Elimination Tournament Final	13:44

== ROH World Tag Team Championship Tournament (2012) ==
On August 3, 2012, Ring of Honor held a tournament for the vacant ROH World Tag Team Championship. The Finals of the tournament took place on September 15, 2012

Teams:

- S.C.U.M. (Jimmy Jacobs and Steve Corino)
- The Bravado Brothers (Harlem and Lance Bravado)
- Caprice Coleman and Cedric Alexander
- The Young Bucks (Matt and Nick Jackson)
- Charlie Haas and Rhett Titus
- The Guardians of Truth (Guardian #1 and Guardian #2)
- The Briscoe Brothers (Jay and Mark Briscoe)
- BLKOUT (Ruckus and Sabian)

Quarterfinals
S.C.U.M.
Bravado Brothers	Pin
Coleman/Alexander	Pin
Young Bucks
Haas/Titus	Pin
Guardians of Truth
Briscoe Brothers
BLKOUT	Pin

Semifinals
S.C.U.M.	Pin
Coleman/Alexander	12:16
Haas/Titus	Pin
Briscoe Brothers	10:47

Finals
S.C.U.M.	12:26
Haas/Titus	Pin

== ROH World Championship Tournament (2013) ==
On July 27, 2013, Ring of Honor held a tournament for the vacant ROH World Championship. The Finals of the tournament took place September 20, 2013.

First round
Jay Lethal	12:59
Sonjay Dutt	Pin
Adam Cole	Pin
Mark Briscoe	12:34
Tommaso Ciampa	Pin
Silas Young	11:14
Michael Bennett	Pin
B. J. Whitmer	10:08
Michael Elgin	20:02
Paul London	Pin
Karl Anderson	10:41
A. C. H.	Pin
Kevin Steen	Pin
Brian Kendrick	12:50
Roderick Strong	Pin
Matt Taven	13:10

Quarterfinals
Jay Lethal	Pin
Adam Cole	16:45
Tommaso Ciampa	14:31
Michael Bennett	Pin
Michael Elgin	Pin
Karl Anderson	17:10
Kevin Steen	12:00
Roderick Strong	Pin

Semifinals
Adam Cole	Pin
Tommaso Ciampa	13:54
Michael Elgin	Pin
Kevin Steen	19:24

Finals
Adam Cole	26:33
Michael Elgin	Pin

== ROH World Television Championship No. 1 Contender Tournament (2015) ==
On July 17, 2015, Ring of Honor held a tournament to crown a number one contender for the ROH World Television Championship.

First round
Christopher Daniels
Mark Briscoe
Bobby Fish
Matt Taven
A. C. H.
Frankie Kazarian

Final
Christopher Daniels
Bobby Fish
ACH

== ROH World Six-Man Tag Team Championship Tournament (2016) ==
On September 3, 2016, Ring of Honor held a tournament for the inaugural ROH World Six-Man Tag Team Championship. The Finals took place on December 2, 2016 at Final Battle which was won by The Kingdom.

== ROH Decade of Excellence Tournament (2016/17) ==
The Decade of Excellence Tournament began on December 4, 2016 with the final taking place on January 14, 2017 to determine the new number one contender for the ROH World Championship.

1st Round
Jushin Liger
Jay Lethal	Pin
B. J. Whitmer
Jay Briscoe	Pin
Colt Cabana
Chris Sabin	Pin
Christopher Daniels	Pin
Mark Briscoe

Semifinals
Jay Lethal
Jay Briscoe	Pin
Chris Sabin
Christopher Daniels	Pin

Finals
Jay Briscoe	15:24
Christopher Daniels	Pin

On March 10, 2017 at Ring of Honor's 15th Anniversary Show Christopher Daniels challenged and defeated Adam Cole to become ROH World Champion for the first time.

== ROH Soaring Eagle Cup (2017) ==
The Soaring Eagle Cup took place on October 28, 2017.

No.	Results	Stipulations
1	Dalton Castle defeated Flip Gordon	Soaring Eagle Cup First Round Match
2	Frankie Kazarian defeated Jay White	Soaring Eagle Cup First Round Match
3	Matt Taven defeated Jay Lethal	Soaring Eagle Cup First Round Match
4	Christopher Daniels vs. Cody ended in a time limit draw	Soaring Eagle Cup First Round Match
5	Silas Young defeated Cheeseburger	Soaring Eagle Cup First Round Match
6	Dalton Castle defeated Frankie Kazarian, Matt Taven and Silas Young	Soaring Eagle Cup Final Four Way Elimination Match

== Women of Honor Championship (2018) ==
Championship tournament to crown the first Women of Honor Champion. At Supercard of Honor XII the first champion was crowned which was Sumie Sakai.

== ROH World Championship No. 1 Contender Tournament (2019) ==
In August 2019, ROH announced a tournament to crown the number one contender for the ROH World Championship. The first round matches will be held at Death Before Dishonor XVII, the semifinals and finals will be held at Glory By Honor XVII. The winner will face the champion at Final Battle.

== ROH Pure Championship Tournament (2020) ==
On January 30, 2020, nearly 14 years after it was retired, Ring of Honor announced they were reinstating the ROH Pure Championship, with a tournament to crown a new champion beginning in 2020. The tournament was supposed to begin on April 12 but ROH suspended its television production due to COVID-19 pandemic. ROH resumed television production in September and the tournament began on September 12. Jonathan Gresham won this tournament to become champion of the reinstated belt.

== ROH Women's World Championship Tournament (2021) ==
On January 1, 2020, ROH announced the deactivation of the Women of Honor World Championship in favor of the new ROH Women's World Championship. A "Quest for Gold" tournament was set for April 24 at the 2300 Arena in Philadelphia, Pennsylvania, but was canceled after ROH announced that it had postponed all live events due to the COVID-19 pandemic. At the ROH 19th Anniversary Show, ROH Board of Directors member Maria Kanellis-Bennett announce the tournament to take place in the summer of 2021. On September 12, 2021 at Death Before Dishonor XVIII the tournament finals took place and Rok-C won and became the inaugural champion.

== ROH World Television Championship No. 1 Contender Tournaments (2023) ==
- On July 13, 2023 it was announced that ROH will be having a four man ROH World Television Championship No. 1 contendership tournament where four men will compete and the winner will face Samoa Joe for the ROH World Television Championship at Death Before Dishonor of year 2023.
- On July 28, 2023 a second ROH World Television Championship No. 1 Contendership tournament was announced where the winner of this one will also face Samoa Joe for the ROH TV Championship due to Samoa Joe being victorious at keeping the title after the first 2023 ROH TV title tournament at ROH Pay-per-view Death Before Dishonor of year 2023.

=== ROH World Television Championship Eliminator Tournament bracket #2 ===
Quarterfinals; ROH TV taping
Christopher Daniels	Pin
JD Drake	N/A
Tony Nese	Pin
Cheeseburger	N/A
Gravity	Pin
Anthony Henry	N/A
Shane Taylor	Pin
Serpentico	N/A

Semifinals; ROH TV taping
Christopher Daniels	N/A
Shane Taylor	Pin
Gravity	Pin
Tony Nese	N/A

Final; ROH TV taping
Shane Taylor	Pin
Gravity	N/A

== ROH Women's World Television Championship Tournament (2023/24) ==
Championship tournament to determine the first ever ROH Women's World Television Championship holder in Ring of Honor history. April 5, 2024 at Supercard of Honor Billie Starkz won the tournament and became the inaugural champion by defeating Queen Aminata in the tournament finals.

== ROH Women's Pure Championship Tournament (2025) ==
On April 22, 2025 Tony Kahn announced the ROH Women's Pure Championship. On December 5, 2025 at Final Battle 2025 in the tournament finals Deonna Purrazzo defeated Billie Starkz via submission to become the inaugural ROH Pure Women's Champion.

== See also ==
- ROH Tag Wars Tournament
- ROH Top Prospect Tournament
- ROH Survival of the Fittest Tournaments
