= ROH Pure Championship =

Men's professional wrestling championship

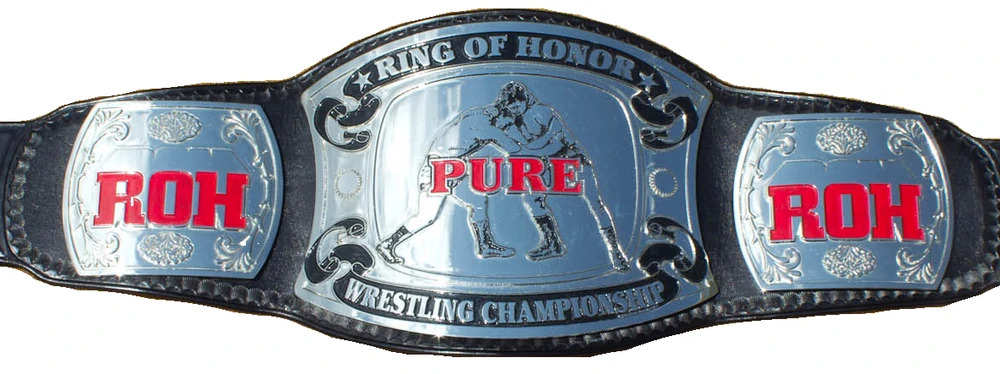
- The first design of the belt (used from years 2004–2006; 2020–2023)

Details
- Promotion: Ring of Honor
- Date established: February 14, 2004
- Current champion: Lee Moriarty
- Date won: July 26, 2024

Other names
- ROH Pure Wrestling Championship (2004); ROH Pure Championship (2004–2006, 2020–present); ROH World Championship (2006)
Statistics
- First champion: A.J. Styles
- Most reigns: Wheeler Yuta (3 reigns)
- Longest reign: Lee Moriarty (836+ days)
- Shortest reign: Bryan Danielson (<1 day)
- Oldest champion: Katsuyori Shibata (43 years, 134 days)
- Youngest champion: Jay Lethal (19 years, 345 days)
- Heaviest champion: Samoa Joe (290 lb (130 kg))
- Lightest champion: Jonathan Gresham (161 lb (73 kg))

The ROH Pure Championship is a men's professional wrestling championship created and promoted by the American promotion Ring of Honor (ROH). Established on February 14, 2004, it is a specialty title that is contested under "Pure Wrestling Rules", and the inaugural champion was A.J. Styles. In addition to being in ROH, the championship is also occasionally defended on All Elite Wrestling's (AEW) programs, as AEW and ROH are both owned by Tony Khan. The reigning champion is Lee Moriarty, who is in his first reign, which is the longest reign in the championship's history. He won the title by defeating Wheeler Yuta at Death Before Dishonor on July 26, 2024.

== History ==
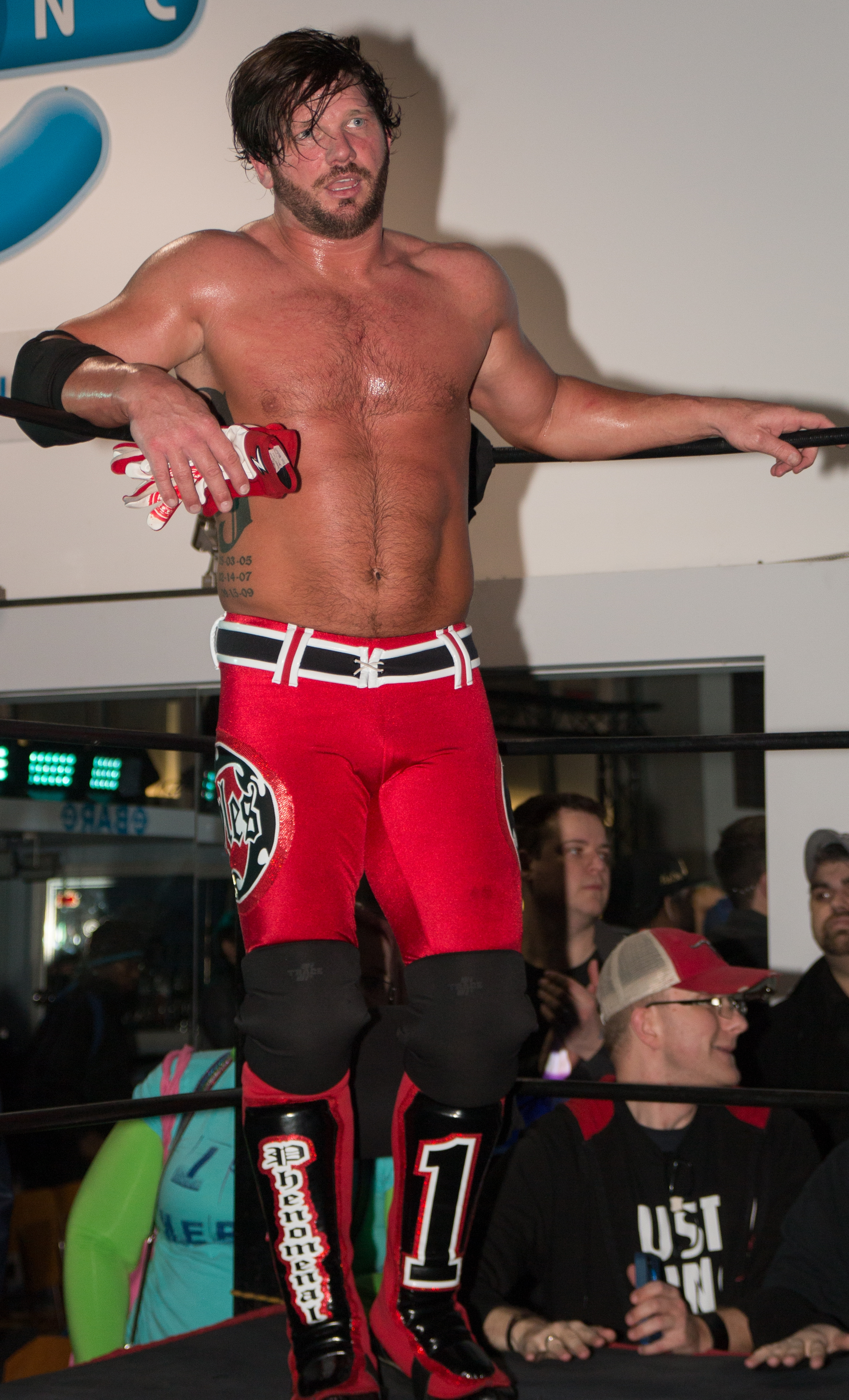
Inaugural champion AJ Styles. His reign was not recognized until 2014 due to the Rob Feinstein controversy.

The title was originally named the ROH Pure Wrestling Championship and A.J. Styles defeated CM Punk in the final of an eight-man, one night tournament to crown the first champion. The tournament took place at the Second Anniversary Show and also featured John Walters, Chris Sabin, Doug Williams, Matt Stryker, Josh Daniels and Jimmy Rave.

Styles was forced to vacate the Pure Wrestling title in the wake of the Rob Feinstein controversy that resulted in Total Nonstop Action Wrestling (TNA) abruptly ending its talent-sharing agreement with ROH (pulling all of its contracted performers, including Styles, from all ROH shows). However, for almost ten years ROH considered the Pure Wrestling Championship and the Pure Championship two distinct titles—not a single title that was merely renamed/re-branded. There was no mention of Styles on ROH's website as having held the Pure Championship, and it was seldom, if ever, acknowledged in commentary that Styles held the previous version of the title or that it even existed until in January 2014, when ROH released a DVD about Styles, describing him as the first ROH Pure Champion. Doug Williams would win the vacant title after he defeated Alex Shelley in the final of a one night mini-tournament at Reborn: Completion on July 17, 2004.

=== Retirement ===
On April 29, 2006, Weekend of Champions: Night Two saw the first ever title vs. title match in Ring of Honor as ROH World Champion Bryan Danielson took on ROH Pure Champion Nigel McGuinness. The match was contested under Pure title rules, but both the World and Pure titles were on the line. McGuinness won the bout by countout, but since only the Pure title could change hands on a countout, he did not win the ROH World Championship. The two faced each other again on August 12, 2006 in Liverpool, England, with Danielson defeating McGuinness to unify the ROH Pure Championship with the ROH World Championship. Having the title put on the line in the United Kingdom while.

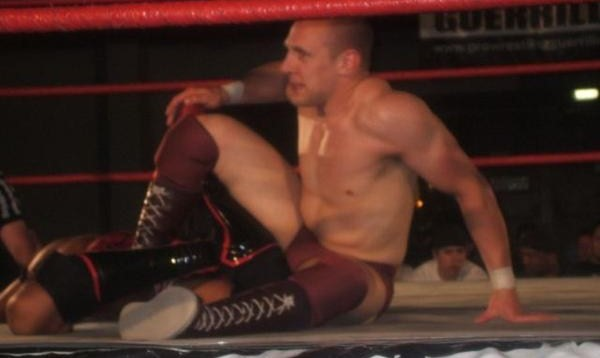
Bryan Danielson defeated Nigel McGuinness in 2006 to unify the Pure title with the ROH World Title.

=== Revival ===
On January 30, 2020, nearly 14 years after it was retired, Ring of Honor announced they were reinstating the ROH Pure Championship, with a tournament to crown a new champion beginning in 2020. Following ROH taking a five-month hiatus due to the COVID-19 pandemic, a 16-man tournament was conducted in August 2020 to crown the new champion, which ultimately became Jonathan Gresham.

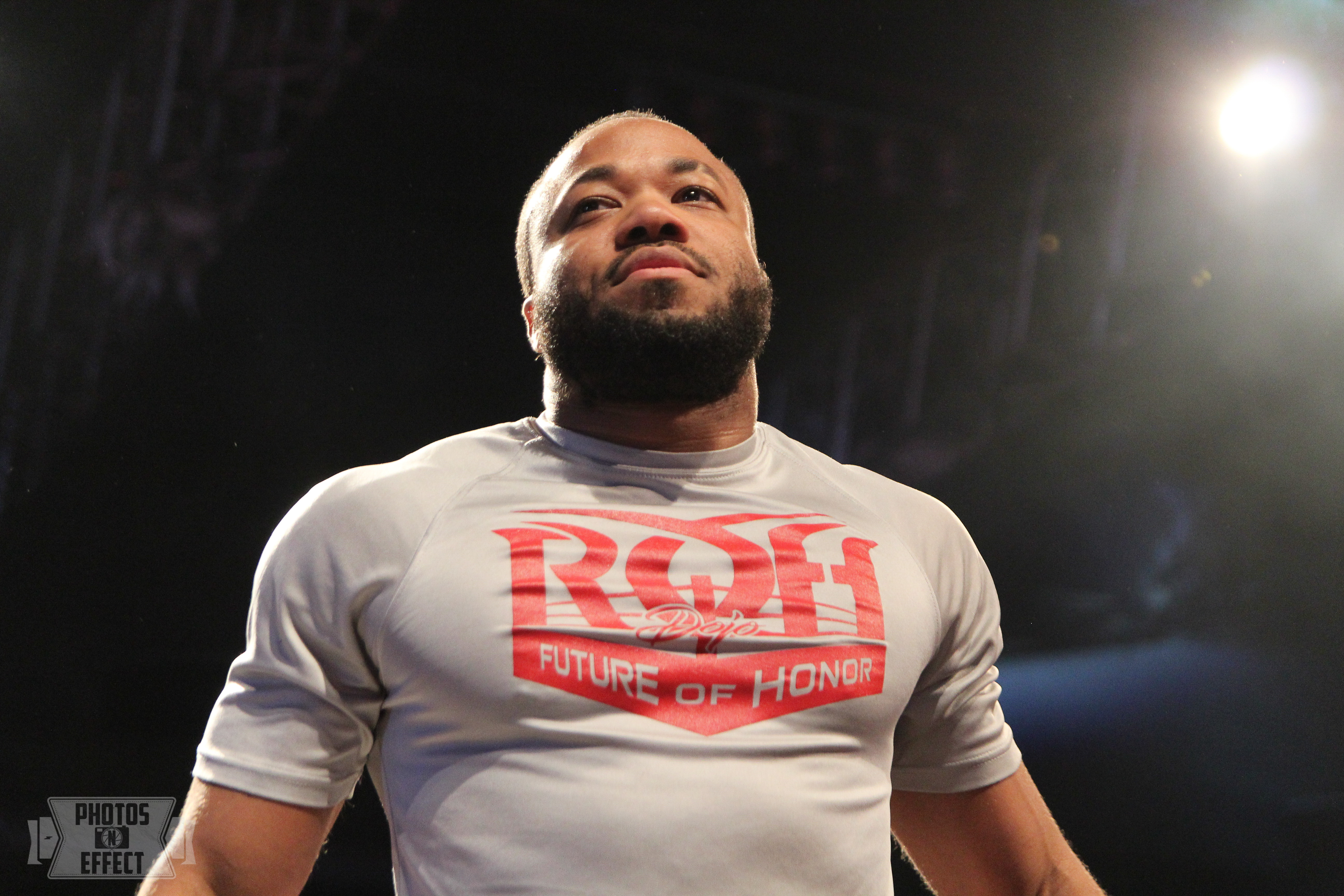
2020 championship revival tournament winner Jonathan Gresham.

== Pure wrestling rules ==
- Matches for the ROH Pure Championship are conducted under "Pure Wrestling Rules." As of 2023, the rules are as follows:
1. Each wrestler has three rope breaks to stop submission holds and pinfalls.
2. After a wrestler exhausts his rope breaks, submission and pin attempts on or under the ropes by his opponent are considered legal.
3. No closed-fist punches to the face permitted.
4. Open-handed slaps or chops to the face are permitted.
5. Punches to the rest of the body are allowed, excluding low blows.
6. The first use of a closed fist to the face receives a warning.
7. The second use of a closed fist to the face results in disqualification.
8. The title can change hands via disqualification and countout.
9. Outside interference will result in automatic termination from the roster for the wrestler that interferes.
10. If a title match reaches its time limit without a winner being declared, the winner is decided by a panel of three judges.

== Inaugural championship tournament (2004) ==
=== Tournament bracket ===
Quarterfinals; ROH Wrestling tapings
A.J. Styles	7:35
Jimmy Rave	Pin
Matt Stryker	Sub
Josh Daniels	8:29
CM Punk	Pin
R. J. Brewer	13:01
Chris Sabin	8:18
Doug Williams	Pin

Semifinals; ROH Wrestling tapings
A.J. Styles	Pin
Matt Stryker	20:46
CM Punk	Sub
Doug Williams	10:44

Finals; ROH 2nd Anniversary Show; February 14, 2004
A.J. Styles	16:37
CM Punk	Pin

== Belt designs ==
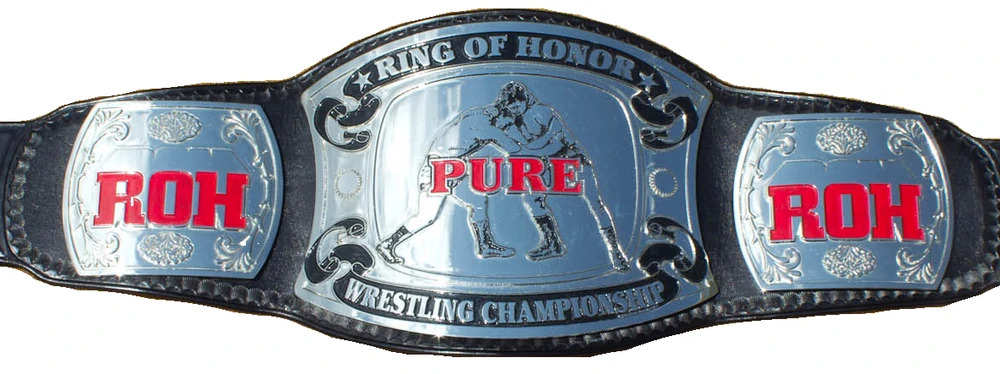
Belt design used from 2004 to 2006 and 2020 to 2023.

The Original ROH Pure title design (2004–2006; 2020–2023) is similar to the first design of the ROH World Championship from years 2002 to 2004 was with different wording in the middle center plate and slightly different middle and side plats with different shaping, wording and designs that are also slightly different from the first ROH World title design from 2002 to 2004 as well.

On March 31, 2023, a new design of the championship belt debuted on Supercard of Honor, making it the second design in the title’s history. The main plate is silver with the top saying "RING OF HONOR," a red text in the middle saying the word "PURE," and text on the bottom saying "WRESTLING CHAMPION." The side plates are also silver with the current Ring of Honor logo.

== Reigns ==
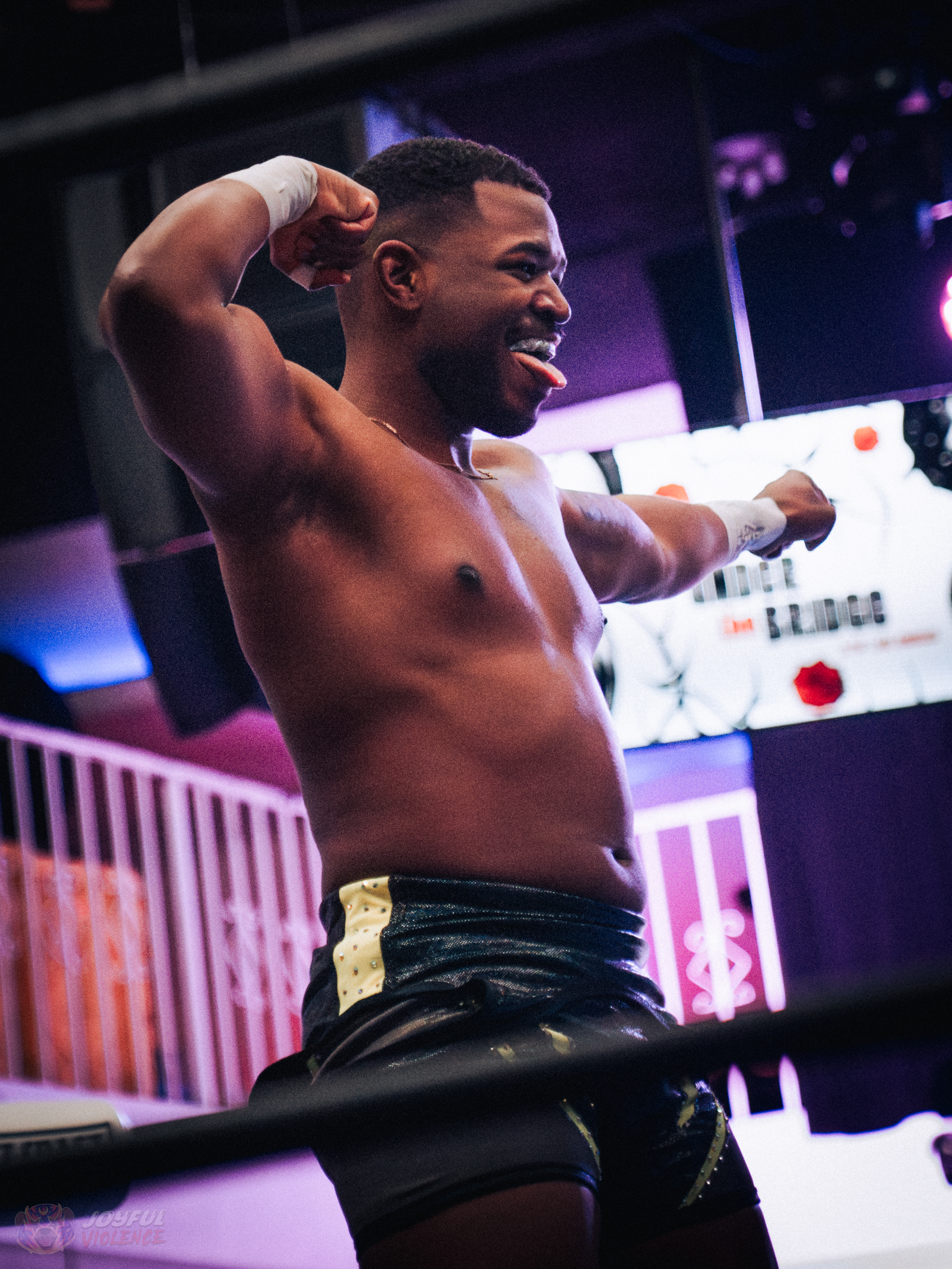
Current champion Lee Moriarty

Overall, there have been 15 championship reigns between 13 different champions. The title has been vacated once. A.J. Styles was the inaugural champion, while Jonathan Gresham was the first champion upon the title's revival. Wheeler Yuta is the only champion to have more than one reign with the title, with a total of three reigns. Current champion Lee Moriarty has the longest reign, eclipsing Nigel McGuinness at 351 days and counting with 6 title defenses. Bryan Danielson had the shortest reign at less than a day since the title was decommissioned after being unified with the ROH World Championship.

Lee Moriarty is the reigning champion in his first reign. He defeated Wheeler Yuta at Death Before Dishonor on July 26, 2024, in Arlington, Texas.

== See also ==
- List of Ring of Honor tournaments
