= Jack Donovan (wrestler) =

March 2026

Personal information
- Born: Joe Jack Dunnavant; November 24, 1928 Montgomery, Alabama, U.S.
- Died: November 27, 2004 (aged 76)
- Cause of death: Construction accident

Professional wrestling career
- Ring name(s): Jack Donovan; Dandy
- Billed height: 5 ft 9 in (175 cm)
- Debut: 1952
- Retired: 1979

Joe Jack Dunnavant (November 24, 1928 – November 27, 2004), better known as "Dandy Jack Donovan, was an American professional wrestler who compete in Gulf Coast Championship Wrestling and won many titles in the territory.

== Professional wrestling career ==
Donovan started wrestling early in 1952 in Georgia, competing there for the next few years and also working as a referee. In 1956, Atlanta promoter Paul Jones assigned Donovan to shepherd Gorgeous George, who had a drinking problem, from town to town, which he did for five months whilst still wrestling in the ring.

Donovan found success in West Virginia, competing as a bleached-blond heel for Ace Freeman, which was in part inspired by his time shepherding Gorgeous George. His success was not limited there as he also thrived in Florida, Tennessee (as Count X), Atlanta and Oklahoma, competing there as “Dandy” Jack for Leroy McGuirk.

He accumulated tag team championships with Jackie Fargo in Alabama in 1962, The Viking in Kansas City in 1966, Ron Reed in Missouri in 1967, Louisiana in 1968, and with Frank Dalton in East Texas and Alabama.

In 1973, during a match gone awry, tensions between Donovan and Tojo Yamamoto erupted into a backstage altercation. Days later, at a television station, the situation took a turn for the worse – Donovan was ambushed by Yamamoto, Jerry Jarrett, and Jackie Fargo, leaving him near death.

Donovan wrestled until his last match took place in 1979.

== Personal life ==
He was married to a woman wrestler, Verne Bottoms (which ended in 1973). During his retirement, he ran a painting company with his second wife Shirley, and served as music director at various churches. He was honored by his peers at the Cauliflower Alley Club reunion in April 1999 in Newton, Iowa.

== Death ==
On November 27, 2004, Dunnavant was instantly killed in a construction accident which saw him fall off a ladder. He was 76 years old.

== Championships and accomplishments ==
- Gulf Coast Championship Wrestling
  - NWA Southern Tag Team Championship (Gulf Coast Version) (1 time) – with Jackie Fargo (1)
- NWA Tri-State
  - NWA Tri-State Tag Team Championship (2 times) - with Ron Reed
