= H. C. Loc =

American professional wrestler (born 1974)

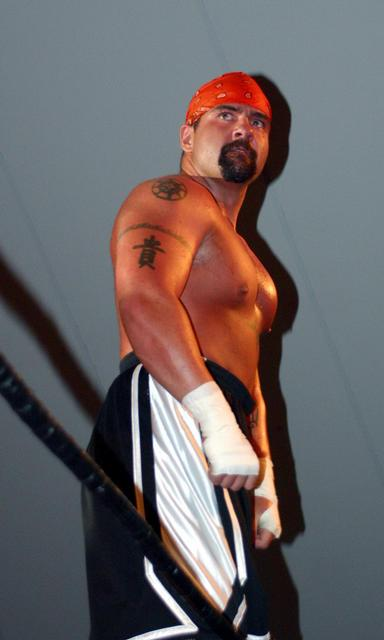

Personal information
- Born: Matthew Knowles; October 8, 1974 (age 52) Elmira, New York, U.S.

Professional wrestling career
- Ring name(s): H. C. Loc; Loc; Matt Knowles; The Masked Chicago Superstar; The Masked Wisconsin Superstar
- Billed height: 5 ft 9 in (175 cm)
- Billed weight: 195 lb (88 kg)
- Billed from: Chicago; Milwaukee, Wisconsin; The Bronx
- Trained by: Bob Bailey; T.C. Reynolds; Dory Funk Jr.
- Debut: August 8, 1996

Matthew Knowles (born October 8, 1974) is an American professional wrestler, better known by his ring name H. C. Loc. He is perhaps best known for his tenure in Ring of Honor, where he is a one-time ROH World Tag Team Champion with Tony DeVito as one-half of the Carnage Crew.

== Professional wrestling career ==
=== Early career (1996–1999) ===
After watching a television advertisement for "Crunchers Gym", a professional wrestling school operated by Bob Bailey, Knowles decided to enroll in order to become a professional wrestler. Despite being uncertain as to whether or not he would be accepted into the school, given that he was exceptionally small for a professional wrestler in the mid-1990s, Knowles contacted Bailey and was admitted to the school. He would then train under Bailey and T.C. Reynolds for six days a week over the course of fifteen months.

After taking part in several tag team matches and battle royals, he wrestled his first singles match on August 8, 1996, against Steve Corino in Bailey's own promotion. Knowles originally wrestled under his own name, but later renamed himself H. C. Loc. The "H. C." stood for "Hard Core" (as in hardcore music, not hardcore wrestling).

From 1996 to 1999, Knowles wrestled on the independent circuit in the northeast, appearing on occasion as an enhancement talent with World Championship Wrestling and the World Wrestling Federation. Knowles also competed in the WWF's first-ever intergender match on the April 6, 1998, edition of Raw against Luna, but lost.

=== Extreme Championship Wrestling (1999–2001) ===
In the summer of 1999, Knowles attended a training seminar held by Dory Funk Jr. in Ocala, Florida. Funk arranged for Knowles to have a try-out match with Extreme Championship Wrestling, which he wrestled the next week in Queens, New York. Knowles was hired by ECW on the basis of the match, and originally worked as a member of the ECW ring crew, constructing and dismantling the ring before and after shows. He also acted as a referee who wrestled on occasions. Like many other ECW employees, Knowles received several paychecks that bounced as owner Paul Heyman's debts began to spiral out of control.

=== Ring of Honor (2002–2005) ===
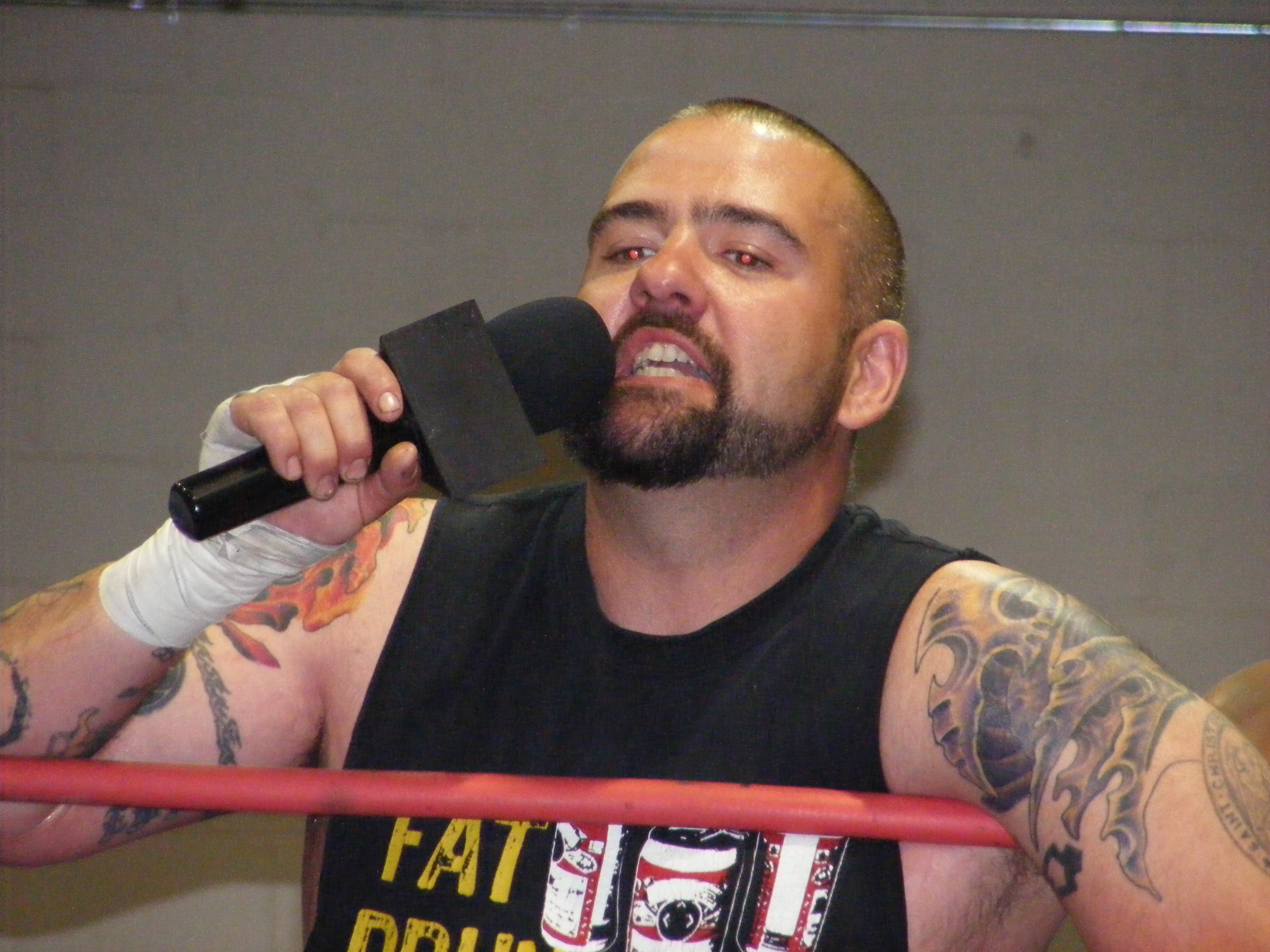
Knowles in May 2009.

Knowles debuted on the inaugural ROH show, Era of Honor Begins, on February 23, 2002, as a referee. On April 27, Knowles formed a tag team with his longtime friend DeVito known as the Carnage Crew. The Carnage Crew was later expanded to include Masada and then again to include Justin Credible. Credible left ROH in 2004, while Masada turned against Knowles and DeVito on May 22, 2004. After briefly feuding with Special K, the Carnage Crew began feuding Dan Maff and B. J. Whitmer. After Maff left ROH, they began feuding with Whitmer and his new partner Jimmy Jacobs. On July 9, 2005, The Carnage Crew defeated Whitmer and Jacobs for the Tag Team Championship. Only a few weeks later at The Hoemcoming, the Carnage Crew re-lost the title to Whitmer and Jacobs on July 23. On August 20 at Night of the Grudges II, the Carnage Crew wrestled their final match in ROH and lost to The Ring Crew Express. After leaving ROH, Knowles took a hiatus from wrestling.

=== Return to wrestling (2008–2011) ===
On January 25, 2008, the National Wrestling Alliance territory NWA Upstate announced that after a three-year-long hiatus, Knowles, under his H. C. Loc ring name, would be returning to their promotion on February 23, 2008, to compete at their event February Fallout. At the event, Loc teamed with Eric Everlast to defeat Super Assassin and Triple X. Later on in the year, he teamed with Cody Deaner to defeat Kid Justice and Rik Matrix on the September 7 episode of Pier 6 Wrestling's Shakedown television show. On April 4, 2009, Loc lost to Nunzio at an Independent Superstars of Professional Wrestling event.

On July 10, 2010, at Acid-Fest: A Tribute to Trent Acid, Loc and DeVito reunited and reformed the Carnage Crew and wrestled in a four-way tag team match also involving the H8 Club and Da Hit Squad, which was ultimately won by The S.A.T.

== Championships and accomplishments ==
- Eastern States Wrestling
  - ESW Cruiserweight Championship (1 time)
- New Breed Wrestling
  - NBW Cruiserweight Championship (1 time)
- New Era Pro Wrestling
  - NEPW North Coast Championship (1 time)
- Nickel City Wrestling
  - NCW Heavyweight Championship (1 time, current)
- NWA Upstate/Upstate Pro Wrestling
  - NWA Upstate / UPW Heavyweight Championship (2 times)
- Pro Wrestling Illustrated
  - PWI ranked him #303 of the top 500 singles wrestlers in the PWI 500 in 2003
- Ring of Honor
  - ROH Tag Team Championship (1 time) – with Tony DeVito
- Ultimate Wrestling
  - UW Heavyweight Championship (1 time)
- United States Wrestling Federation
  - USWF Light Heavyweight Championship (1 time)
- World of Hurt Wrestling
  - WOHW Heavyweight Championship (1 time)
  - WOHW Tag Team Championship (1 time) – with Danger
  - WOHW United States Championship (2 times)
- Other titles
  - AWA Cruiserweight Championship (1 time)
