= List of Progress Wrestling tournaments =

Progress Wrestling has held a variety of professional wrestling tournaments competed for by wrestlers that are a part of their roster.

== Inaugural PROGRESS Championship Tournament (2012) ==
This tournament was held at Chapter One: In The Beginning on 25 March 2012 to crown the inaugural PROGRESS World Champion. It was won by Nathan Cruz.

Tournament bracket

1st Round; Chapter One: In The Beginning; 25 March 2012
Nathan Cruz	Pinfall
Colossus Kennedy	10:41
Noam Dar	12:01
El Ligero	Pinfall
Mike Mason	Pinfall
Colt Cabana	10:07
Zack Sabre Jr.	21:45
Marty Scurll	Pinfall

Final (Note: The tournament final was a four-way elimination match.); Chapter One: In The Beginning; 25 March 2012
Nathan Cruz	Win (Note: Order of elimination: El Ligero, Mike Mason, Marty Scurll)
El Ligero	26:05
Mike Mason	—
Marty Scurll	—

== Progress Atlas Championship tournaments ==
=== Inaugural Progress Atlas Championship Tournament (2016) ===
This round-robin tournament was held to crown the inaugural Progress Atlas Champion. It used a two-block system with the two participants with the most points each block advancing to the semifinals. For the block matches, two points were awarded for a win and one point for a time-limit draw. The tournament began at Chapter 28: Please, Please, Please, Let Me Get What I Want on 10 April 2016 and ended at Chapter 36: We're Gonna Need a Bigger Room... Again on 25 September. The tournament was won by Rampage Brown.

Tournament

Matches

Legend
Block A match
Block B match
Semifinal match
Tournament final match

Tournament matches
Dates	Show	Venue	Matches		Time
10 April	Chapter 28: Please, Please, Please, Let Me Get What I Want	O_{2} Ritz; Manchester, England	A	T-Bone defeated Big Daddy Walter	9:45
24 April	Chapter 29: Practically PROGRESS In Every Way	Electric Ballroom; Camden Town, London, England	B	Michael Dante defeated Damian O'Connor	6:56
24 April	Chapter 29: Practically PROGRESS In Every Way	Electric Ballroom; Camden Town, London, England	B	Joe Coffey vs. Rampage Brown ended in a time-limit draw	15:00
15 May	ENDVR:16	The Garage; Highbury, London, England	A	T-Bone defeated Iestyn Rees	9:35
May 29	Chapter 30: Super Strong Style 16 Tournament Edition 2016; Night 1	Electric Ballroom; Camden Town, London, England	A	Big Daddy Walter defeated Dave Mastiff	11:13
19 June	Chapter 31: All Hail The New Puritans	O_{2} Ritz; Manchester, England	B	Damian O'Connor and Joe Coffey defeated Mikey Whiplash (Note: Mikey Whiplash replaced Michael Dante.) and Rampage Brown	7:22
26 June	Chapter 32: 5000 To 1	Electric Ballroom; Camden Town, London, England	B	Rampage Brown defeated Damian O'Connor by forfeit	—N/a
26 June	Chapter 32: 5000 To 1	Electric Ballroom; Camden Town, London, England	A	T-Bone and Zack Gibson (Note: Zack Gibson replaced Dave Mastiff.) defeated Big Daddy Walter and Iestyn Rees	9:56
14 August	Chapter 34: Keep It Unreal	O_{2} Ritz; Manchester, England	A	Dave Mastiff defeated Iestyn Rees	6:33
14 August	Chapter 34: Keep It Unreal	O_{2} Ritz; Manchester, England	B	Joe Coffey defeated Michael Dante	9:23
28 August	Chapter 35: Writing Nirvana On Other People's Bags	Electric Ballroom; Camden Town, London, England	SF	Joe Coffey defeated Dave Mastiff	9:24
28 August	Chapter 35: Writing Nirvana On Other People's Bags	Electric Ballroom; Camden Town, London, England	SF	Rampage Brown defeated T-Bone	9:46
25 September	Chapter 36: We're Gonna Need A Bigger Room ... Again	O_{2} Brixton Academy; London, England	F	Rampage Brown defeated Joe Coffey	13:53

Blocks
Wrestler qualified to playoffs
Wrestler won the match (2 points)
Match ended in a time-limit draw (1 point)
Wrestler lost the match (0 points)

Block A participants
Block A
#	Wrestler	Score
1	T-Bone	6
2	Dave Mastiff	4
3	Big Daddy Walter	2
4	Iestyn Rees	0

Block A bracket
Block A	Singles opponent				Tag team match (9:56)
Block A	T-Bone	Walter	Rees	Mastiff	Tag team match (9:56)
T-Bone	—N/a	9:45	9:35	—N/a	T-Bone & Gibson
Walter	9:45	—N/a	—N/a	11:13	Walter & Rees
Rees	9:35	—N/a	—N/a	6:33	Walter & Rees
Mastiff	—N/a	11:13	6:33	—N/a	T-Bone & Gibson

Block B participants
Block B
#	Wrestler	Score
1	Joe Coffey	5
2	Rampage Brown	3
3	Michael Dante	2
4	Damian O'Connor	2

Block B bracket
Block B	Singles opponent				Tag team match (7:22)
Block B	Dante	O'Connor	Coffey	Brown	Tag team match (7:22)
Dante	—N/a	6:56	9:23	—N/a	Brown & Whiplash
O'Connor	6:56	—N/a	—N/a	Forfeit	O'Connor & Coffey
Coffey	9:23	—N/a	—N/a	15:00	O'Connor & Coffey
Brown	—N/a	Forfeit	15:00	—N/a	Brown & Whiplash

Playoffs

Semifinals; Chapter 35: Writing Nirvana On Other People's Bags; 28 August 2016
B1	Joe Coffey	Pinfall
A2	Dave Mastiff	9:24
A1	T-Bone	9:46
B2	Rampage Brown	Pinfall

Final; Chapter 36: We're Gonna Need A Bigger Room ... Again; 25 September 2016
B1	Joe Coffey	13:53
B2	Rampage Brown	Pinfall

=== Progress Atlas Championship Tournament (2022) ===
This tournament was held to crown the new Progress Atlas Champion. On 21 July 2019 at Chapter 95: Still Chasing, Progress Wrestling replaced the Atlas Championship with the Progress Proteus Championship, officially retiring the title. Three years later, the title was reactivated. The tournament was won by Luke Jacobs.

Tournament bracket

1st Round; Chapter 132: By The Beard Of Zeus; 17 April 2022 (Aired: 30 April); DEFY 50; 26 February 2022
Luke Jacobs	Pinfall
Big Damo	6:26
Warren Banks	Pinfall
Axel Tischer	9:13
Jonah	Pinfall
Schaff	13:51
Rickey Shane Page	Pinfall (Note: This was a triple threat elimination match. Order of elimination: Joe Hendry, Will Kroos)
Joe Hendry Will Kroos	— 10:21

Semifinals; Chapter 133: Stop Motion Skeleton Battle; 18 April 2022 (Aired: 7 May)
Luke Jacobs	Pinfall
Warren Banks	10:56
Jonah	Pinfall
Rickey Shane Page	9:19

Final; Chapter 133: Stop Motion Skeleton Battle; 18 April 2022 (Aired: 7 May)
Luke Jacobs	Pinfall
Jonah	15:16

== PROGRESS Tag Team Championship tournaments ==
=== Inaugural PROGRESS Tag Team Championship Tournament ===
This tournament was held to crown the inaugural PROGRESS Tag Team Champions. The tournament was won by FSU (Eddie Dennis and Mark Andrews).

Tournament bracket

1st Round; Chapter 10: Glory Follows Virtue As If It Were Its Shadow; 24 November 2013; Chapter 11: To Fight War, You Must Become War; 26 January 2014
Grado and Mad Man Manson	12:54
Project Ego (Kris Travis and Martin Kirby)	Win
The Bhangra Knights (Darrell Allen and RJ Singh)	Count out (7:02)
The London Riots (James Davis and Rob Lynch)	Count out (7:02)
Dave Mastiff and Stixx	17:39
Screw Indy Wrestling (Mark Haskins and Nathan Cruz)	Win
FSU (Eddie Dennis and Mark Andrews)	Win
The Swords of Essex (Paul Robinson and Will Ospreay)	12:42

Final; Chapter 12: We're Gonna Need A Bigger Room; 30 March 2014
Project Ego	—
N/A	—
Screw Indy Wrestling	—
FSU	Win

=== PROGRESS Tag Team Championship Tournament (2021) ===
This tournament was for the vacant PROGRESS Tag Team Championship. The title was vacated after the previous champions Jordan Devlin and Scotty Davis were legitimately suspended. The tournament was won by Lykos Gym (Kid Lykos and Kid Lykos II).

Tournament bracket

1st Round; Chapter 108: Of Course You Realize This Means War; 10 April 2021; Chapter 109: Dreaming In 3D; 24 April 2021
The Young Guns (Ethan Allen and Luke Jacobs)	Pinfall
Chris Ridgeway and Danny Black	20:57
Big Money Gun Dogs (Big Guns Joe and Gene Munny)	12:56
Sunshine Machine (Chuck Mambo and TK Cooper)	Pinfall
Smokin' Aces (Charlie Sterling and Nick Riley)	Pinfall
Greedy Souls (Brendan White and Danny Jones)	10:50

Semifinals; Chapter 110: Skeleton Head; 8 May 2021
The Young Guns	Pinfall
Sunshine Machine	16:35
Smokin' Aces	11:57
Lykos Gym (Kid Lykos and Kid Lykos II)	Pinfall

Final; Chapter 112: The Flowers Are Still Standing; 5 June 2021
The Young Guns	27:43
Lykos Gym	Referee's decision

== PROGRESS World Cup ==
=== World Cup (2014) ===
Tournament bracket

Quarterfinals; World Cup; 29 June 2014
(Wales)	Eddie Dennis	8:22
(Netherlands)	Tommy End	Pinfall
(England)	Rampage Brown	Pinfall
(Canada)	Paul Synnot	8:51
(Scotland)	Grado	18:00
(Israel)	Noam Dar	Pinfall
(Jamaica)	Darrell Allen	Pinfall
(India)	RJ Singh	8:33

Semifinals; World Cup; 29 June 2014
(Netherlands)	Tommy End	5:11
(England)	Rampage Brown	Pinfall
(Israel)	Noam Dar	Pinfall
(Jamaica)	Darrell Allen	11:37

Final; World Cup; 29 June 2014
(England)	Rampage Brown	15:40
(Israel)	Noam Dar	Pinfall

=== World Cup (2018) ===
Tournament bracket

1st Round; World Cup 2018; 13 June 2018
(Japan)	Naoki Tanizaki	Pinfall
(Portugal)	David Francisco	9:38
(England)	Ruslan	11:56
(Russia)	Chuck Mambo	Pinfall
(Germany)	Bad Bones	Pinfall
(Switzerland)	Oliver Carter	9:28
(Australia)	Adam Brooks	Pinfall
(Australia)	Einar Ironside	7:53

Semifinals; World Cup 2018; 13 June 2018
(Japan)	Naoki Tanizaki	15:40
(England)	Chuck Mambo	Pinfall
(Germany)	Bad Bones	8:25
(Australia)	Adam Brooks	Pinfall

Final; World Cup 2018; 13 June 2018
(England)	Chuck Mambo	Pinfall
(Australia)	Adam Brooks	12:21

== Sporadic tournaments ==
=== PROGRESS Women's Championship #1 Contendership Tournament (2017) ===
Tournament bracket

1st Round; Revelations Of Divine Love; 2 October 2017
Jinny	Pinfall
Candyfloss	—
Sierra Loxton	—
Millie McKenzie	Pinfall
Chakara	Pinfall
Zoe Lucas	—
Charlie Morgan	—
Charli Evans	Pinfall

Semifinals; Revelations Of Divine Love; 2 October 2017
Jinny	Pinfall
Millie McKenzie	—
Chakara	—
Charli Evans	Pinfall

Finals; Revelations Of Divine Love; 2 October 2017
Jinny	—
Charli Evans	Pinfall

=== Revelations Of Divine Love Tournament (2021) ===
Tournament bracket

1st Round; Chapter 123: The Taking Of Peckham; 2 October 2021; Chapter 124: Cakehorn; 16 October 2021
Mercedez Blaze	Pinfall
Raven Creed	10:46
Lizzy Evo	10:42
Alexxis Falcon	Pinfall
Skye Smitson	Pinfall
Laura Di Matteo	9:05
Lana Austin	10:01
Rhio	Pinfall

Semifinals; Chapter 125: Castle Of Illusion; 13 November 2021; Chapter 126: Behold The Turtle; 27 November 2021
Mercedez Blaze	Pinfall
Alexxis Falcon	11:51
Skye Smitson	11:55
Rhio	Referee's decision

Finals; Chapter 127: And The Word Was PROGRESS... 23 January 2022 (Aired: 29 January)
Mercedez Blaze	12:28
Rhio	Pinfall

== Natural Progression Series ==
Natural Progression Series was an annual professional wrestling tournament produced by Progress Wrestling since its inaugural tournament in 2012. The tournament showcased upstart rising wrestlers from the United Kingdom. The winner received a championship match of their choosing at anytime and any place. The winner also got to name a participant of their choosing in the next Natural Progression Series.

#	Winner	Tournament Final			Runner-up	Ref
#	Winner	Event	Date	Location	Runner-up	Ref
I	Mark Andrews	Chapter Ten: Glory Follows Virtue As If It Were Its Shadow	24 November 2013	London, England	Paul Robinson	
II	Morgan Webster	Chapter 17: Harder, Better, Faster, Stronger	25 January 2015	London, England	Zack Gibson	
III	William Eaver	Chapter 29: Practically PROGRESS In Every Way	24 April 2016	London, England	Damon Moser	
IV	Toni Storm	Chapter 49: Super Strong Style 16	28 May 2017	London, England	Jinny	
IV	Toni Storm	Chapter 49: Super Strong Style 16	28 May 2017	London, England	Laura Di Matteo	
V	Mark Davis	Chapter 72: Got Got Need	24 June 2018	London, England	Chris Ridgeway	
VI	Scotty Davis	Natural Progression Series 6	14 September 2019	London, England	Danny Duggan	
VII	Luke Jacobs	Chapter 105: Bring the Thunder	27 February 2021	London, England	Warren Banks	
8	Ricky Knight Jr.	Chapter 146: They Think It's All Over...	27 November 2022	London, England	Tate Mayfairs	

=== Championship opportunity ===
– Championship victory
– Tournament was for a championship
– Championship match loss

#	Winner	Championship	Event	Date	Result	Ref
1	Mark Andrews	Progress Championship	Chapter Ten: Glory Follows Virtue As If It Were Its Shadow	24 November 2013	Defeated Rampage Brown.	
2	Morgan Webster	Progress Championship	Chapter 24: Hit The North	6 December 2015	Defeated Will Ospreay and Zack Gibson in a three-way match. (Note: Morgan Webster was inserted into Will Ospreay's Progress Championship defense against Zack Gibson, turning the match into a three-way match. This decision was due to Webster losing the Natural Progression Series trophy to Gibson caused by outside interference at Chapter 23: What A Time To Be Alive!.)	
3	Pastor William Eaver	Progress World Championship	Chapter 32: 5000 To 1	26 June 2016	Defeated Marty Scurll.	
4	Toni Storm	Inaugural Progress Women's Championship	Chapter 49: Super Strong Style 16; Night 2	28 May 2017	Defeated Jinny and Laura Di Matteo in a three-way match in the Natural Progression Series IV final.	
5	Mark Davis	Progress Tag Team Championship	Chapter 87: Breadknife	31 March 2019	Aussie Open (Mark Davis and Kyle Fletcher) defeated The Swords of Essex (Will Ospreay and Paul Robinson) in a ladder match.	
6	Scotty Davis	Progress Tag Team Championship	Chapter 95: Still Chasing	15 September 2019	Scotty Davis and Jordan Devlin defeated Grizzled Young Veterans (James Drake and Zack Gibson) and Aussie Open (Mark Davis and Kyle Fletcher) in a three-way tag team match.	
7	Luke Jacobs	Progress World Championship	Chapter 106: Stick A Pony In Me Pocket	13 March 2021	Lost to Cara Noir.	
8	Ricky Knight Jr.	Progress Atlas Championship	Chapter 150: When The Man Comes Around	26 February 2023	Defeated Big Damo.	

== Super Strong Style 16 ==
Super Strong Style 16 is an annual professional wrestling single elimination tournament produced by Progress Wrestling. First introduced in 2015, the tournament comprises four rounds and features sixteen professional wrestlers who compete in singles matches. The tournament is used to determine the #1 contender for the PROGRESS World Championship. An exception was during the 2022 edition, where the title was declared vacant before the tournament and the title was decided in the tournament. The tournament has been notable for featuring various professional wrestlers, who have gone on to achieve huge mainstream success, competing for promotions such as WWE, All Elite Wrestling and New Japan Pro-Wrestling.

=== List of winners ===
Year	Division	Tournament winner	Times won	Runner-up	Dates	City	Venue	Ref
2015	—N/a	Will Ospreay	1	Zack Sabre Jr.	24–25 May 2015	London, England	Electric Ballroom	
2016	—N/a	Tommy End	1	Mark Andrews	29–30 May 2016	London, England	Electric Ballroom	
2017	—N/a	Travis Banks	1	Tyler Bate	27–29 May 2017	London, England	Electric Ballroom	
2018	—N/a	Zack Sabre Jr.	1	Kassius Ohno	5–7 May 2018	London, England	Alexandra Palace	
2019	—N/a	David Starr	1	Jordan Devlin	4–6 May 2019	London, England	Alexandra Palace	
2022	—N/a	Chris Ridgeway	1	Warren Banks	3–5 June 2022	London, England	Electric Ballroom	
2023	—N/a	Kid Lykos	1	Mark Haskins	27–29 May 2023	London, England	The Dome Electric Ballroom	
2024	—N/a	Luke Jacobs	1	Ricky Knight Jr.	26–27 May 2024	London, England	Electric Ballroom	
2025	—N/a	Man Like DeReiss	1	Leon Slater	4–5 May 2025	London, England	Electric Ballroom	
2026	Men	Charles Crowley	1	Charlie Sterling	4–5 May 2026	London, England	Electric Ballroom	
2026	Women	Rhio	1	Gisele Shaw	4–5 May 2026	London, England	Electric Ballroom	

=== Championship opportunity ===
– Championship victory
– Championship match loss

#	Tournament winner	Championship	Event	Date	Result
1	Will Ospreay	PROGRESS World Championship	Chapter 20: Thunderbastard - Beyond Thunderbastard	26 July 2015	Defeated Jimmy Havoc in a no disqualification match.
2	Tommy End	PROGRESS World Championship	Chapter 32: 5000 To 1	26 June 2016	Lost to Marty Scurll.
3	Travis Banks	PROGRESS World Championship	Chapter 55: Chase The Sun	10 September 2017	Defeated Pete Dunne.
4	Zack Sabre Jr.	PROGRESS World Championship	Chapter 77: Pumpkin Spice PROGRESS	28 October 2018	Lost to Walter.
5	David Starr	PROGRESS World Championship	Chapter 95: Still Chasing	15 September 2019	Lost to Eddie Dennis in a three-way match that also involved Walter.
6	Kid Lykos	PROGRESS World Championship	Chapter 157: Hungry Like The Wolf	24 September 2023	Lost to Spike Trivet.
7	Luke Jacobs	PROGRESS World Championship	Chapter 169: The Devil On My Shoulder	28 July 2024	Defeated Kid Lykos.
8	Man Like DeReiss	PROGRESS World Championship	Chapter 183: Hundred Volts	25 August 2025	Defeated Luke Jacobs in a tables, ladders, and chairs match.

== See also ==
- List of major Progress Wrestling events
