= Progress Chapter 179: Progress Las Vegas =

2025 Progress Wrestling event

Chapter 179: Progress Las Vegas
- Promotional poster of the event
- Promotion: Progress Wrestling
- Date: 17 April 2025
- City: Paradise, Nevada
- Venue: Pearl Theater at Palms Casino Resort
- Attendance: 608

Event chronology
← Previous; Chapter 178: Fix Your Hearts	Next → Super Strong Style 16

Progress Chapter 179: Progress Las Vegas was a professional wrestling pay-per-view event produced by Progress Wrestling. It took place on 17 April 2025 in Paradise, Nevada, at the Pearl Theater at Palms Casino Resort. The event was streamed live on Triller TV and was held in conjunction with Game Changer Wrestling's (GCW) Collective.

Seven matches were contested at the event. The main event saw Luke Jacobs defeat Michael Oku to retain the PROGRESS World Championship. In another prominent match, Paul Walter Hauser won a five-way scramble match to win the Progress Proteus Championship.

== Production ==
=== Storylines ===
The event included matches that each resulted from scripted storylines, where wrestlers portrayed heroes, villains, or less distinguishable characters in scripted events that built tension and culminated in a wrestling match or series of matches. Results were predetermined by Progress' creative writers, while storylines were produced on Progress' events airing on the Demand PROGRESS streaming service.

=== Event ===
The event started with the tag team confrontation between Boisterous Behaviour (Leon Slater and Man Like DeReiss), and Lykos Gym (Kid Lykos and Kid Lykos II) solded with the victory of the latter team. Next up, 1 Called Manders defeated Tate Mayfairs and Marcus Mathers to retain the wXw Unified World Wrestling Championship. The third bout saw Mike D Vecchio picking up a victory over Kuro in singles competition. In the fourth bout, Nina Samuels defeated Rhio and VertVixen to secure the third consecutive defense of the Progress Women's Championship in that respective reign. The fifth bout saw Paul Walter Hauser defeat reigning champion Simon Miller to win the Progress Proteus Championship in a five-way scramble match which also involved Effy, Adam Priest and Charles Crowley. In the semi main event, Minoru Suzuki defeated Cara Noir in singles competition.

In the main event, Luke Jacobs defeated Michael Oku to secure the eleventh consecutive defense of the PROGRESS World Championship in that respective reign.

== Results ==
No.	Results	Stipulations	Times
1	Lykos Gym (Kid Lykos and Kid Lykos II) defeated Boisterous Behaviour (Leon Slater and Man Like DeReiss)	Tag team match	11:22
2	1 Called Manders (c) defeated Tate Mayfairs and Marcus Mathers	Three-way match for the wXw Unified World Wrestling Championship	8:19
3	Mike D Vecchio defeated Kuro	Singles match (Note: Vecchio was originally scheduled to challenge Axel Tischer for the Progress Atlas Championship but the bout was scrapped due to Tischer having visa issues.)	5:17
4	Nina Samuels (c) defeated Rhio and VertVixen	Three-way match for the Progress Women's Championship	11:45
5	Paul Walter Hauser defeated Simon Miller (c), Effy, Adam Priest and Charles Crowley	Five-way scramble match for the Progress Proteus Championship	8:40
6	Minoru Suzuki defeated Cara Noir	Singles match	13:30
7	Luke Jacobs (c) defeated Michael Oku (with Amira Blair)	Singles match for the PROGRESS World Championship	17:04
(c) / – the champion(s) heading into the match
