= Progress Chapter 166: Freedom Walks Again =

2024 Progress Wrestling event

- Promotional poster of the event
- Promotion: Progress Wrestling
- Date: April 5, 2024
- City: Philadelphia, Pennsylvania
- Venue: Penns Landing Caterers
- Attendance: 750

Event chronology
← Previous; Chapter 165: Diamond Dust	Next → Chapter 167: One Bump Or Two?

Progress Chapter 166: Freedom Walks Again was a professional wrestling pay-per-view event produced by Progress Wrestling. It took place on April 5, 2024, in Philadelphia, Pennsylvania at the Penns Landing Caterers. The event was broadcast live on Triller TV and also featured wrestlers from Game Changer Wrestling (GCW) and was held in conjunction with the Collective.

== Production ==
=== Storylines ===
The event included matches that each resulted from scripted storylines, where wrestlers portrayed heroes, villains, or less distinguishable characters in scripted events that built tension and culminated in a wrestling match or series of matches. Results were predetermined by Progress' creative writers, while storylines were produced on Progress' events airing on the Demand PROGRESS streaming service.

=== Event ===
The event started with a seven-way scramble match won by Kid Lykos and also involving Cody Chhun, Gringo Loco, Leon Slater, Marcus Mathers, Simon Miller and Tate Mayfairs. In the second bout, Yoshiki Inamura defeated Ricky Knight Jr. to win the Progress Wrestling Atlas Championship, ending the latter's reign at 404 days and 6 successful defenses which was the longest until its date. The third bout saw Allie Katch and Effy outmatching Gene Munny and Session Moth Martina in intergender tag team competition. Next up, Luke Jacobs defeated Spike Trivet in singles competition. The fifth bout saw Rhio defeating Lana Austin to secure the seventh consecutive defense of the Progress Wrestling World Women's Championship in that respective reign. In the sixth match, Big Damo and Axel Tischer defeated reigning champions Alexxis Falcon and Charles Crowley and the team of Sunshine Machine (Chuck Mambo and TK Cooper) to win the PROGRESS Tag Team Championship.

In the main event, Kid Lykos defeated Man Like DeReiss to secure the second consecutive defense of the PROGRESS World Championship in that respective reign.

== Results ==
No.	Results	Stipulations	Times
1	Kid Lykos II defeated Cody Chhun, Gringo Loco, Leon Slater, Marcus Mathers, Simon Miller and Tate Mayfairs by pinfall	Seven-way scramble match	9:21
2	Yoshiki Inamura defeated Ricky Knight Jr. (c) by pinfall	Singles match for the Progress Wrestling Atlas Championship	13:34
3	Bussy (Allie Katch and Effy) defeated Gene Munny and Session Moth Martina by pinfall	Tag team match	11:36
4	Luke Jacobs defeated Spike Trivet by pinfall	Singles match	10:32
5	Rhio (c) defeated Lana Austin by pinfall	Singles match for the Progress Wrestling World Women's Championship	13:53
6	Sanity (Big Damo and Axel Tischer) defeated Cheeky Little Buggers (Alexxis Falcon and Charles Crowley) (c) and Sunshine Machine (Chuck Mambo and TK Cooper) by pinfall	Three-way tag team match for the PROGRESS Tag Team Championship	18:51
7	Kid Lykos (c) defeated Man Like DeReiss (with Leon Slater) by pinfall	Singles match for the PROGRESS World Championship	17:11
(c) / – the champion(s) heading into the match
