= Super Strong Style 16 (2025) =

2025 professional wrestling tournament by Progress Wrestling

- Promotional poster of the event
- Promotion: Progress Wrestling
- Date: Night One: May 4, 2025; Night Two: May 5, 2025
- City: London, England
- Venue: Electric Ballroom
- Attendance: Night 1: cca. 600; Night 2: cca. 600

Event chronology
← Previous; Chapter 179: Progress Las Vegas	Next → Chapter 181: Far From Ordinary People

Super Strong Style 16 chronology
← Previous; 2024	Next → 2026

The 2025 Super Strong Style 16 was the ninth Super Strong Style 16 professional wrestling tournament produced by Progress Wrestling. It was a two-night event, which took place on May 4 and 5, 2025 and was held at the Electric Ballroom in London, England.

== Production ==
=== Storylines ===
The event included matches that each resulted from scripted storylines, where wrestlers portrayed heroes, villains, or less distinguishable characters in scripted events that built tension and culminated in a wrestling match or series of matches. Results were predetermined by Progress' creative writers, while storylines were produced on Progress' events airing on the Demand PROGRESS streaming service.

== Results ==
Night 1 (May 4)
No.	Results	Stipulations	Times
1	Man Like DeReiss defeated Ethan Allen by submission	First round match in the Super Strong Style 16 tournament	8:22
2	Zozaya defeated Kid Lykos II by pinfall	First round match in the Super Strong Style 16 tournament	8:35
3	Charlie Sterling defeated Simon Miller by pinfall	First round match in the Super Strong Style 16 tournament	4:51
4	Will Kroos defeated Marcus Mathers by pinfall	First round match in the Super Strong Style 16 tournament	8:13
5	Michael Oku (with Amira Blair) defeated Kid Lykos by pinfall	First round match in the Super Strong Style 16 tournament	12:48
6	Trent Seven defeated Gene Munny by pinfall	First round match in the Super Strong Style 16 tournament	10:36
7	Masa Kitamiya defeated Tate Mayfairs by pinfall	First round match in the Super Strong Style 16 tournament	5:12
8	Leon Slater defeated Jack Morris by pinfall	First round match in the Super Strong Style 16 tournament	6:59
9	Rhio defeated Nina Samuels (c) by pinfall	Title vs. PROGRESS Career match for the PROGRESS Women's Championship; Kanji was the special guest referee.	17:41
(c) / – the champion(s) heading into the match

Night 2 (May 5)
No.	Results	Stipulations	Times
1	Leon Slater defeated Zozaya by pinfall	Quarterfinal match in the Super Strong Style 16 tournament	9:21
2	Man Like DeReiss defeated Masa Kitamiya by pinfall	Quarterfinal match in the Super Strong Style 16 tournament	6:58
3	Charlie Sterling defeated Will Kroos by pinfall	Quarterfinal match in the Super Strong Style 16 tournament	7:09
4	Michael Oku defeated Trent Seven by technical knockout	Quarterfinal match in the Super Strong Style 16 tournament	5:43
5	Luke Jacobs (c) defeated Cara Noir by pinfall	Singles match for the PROGRESS World Championship	20:21
6	Man Like DeReiss defeated Charlie Sterling by submission	Semifinal match in the Super Strong Style 16 tournament	6:56
7	Leon Slater defeated Michael Oku by pinfall	Semifinal match in the Super Strong Style 16 tournament	14:03
8	Simon Miller won by last eliminating Kid Lykos (Note: Order of elimination: Gene Munny, Ethan Allen, Jack Morris, Marcus Mathers, Kid Lykos II, Tate Mayfairs, and Kid Lykos)	Battle royal	13:09
9	Man Like DeReiss defeated Leon Slater by pinfall	Super Strong Style 16 tournament final	27:24
(c) / – the champion(s) heading into the match

=== Tournament bracket ===
1st Round; Chapter 180: Super Strong Style 16; Night 1; 4 May 2025
Man Like DeReiss	Submission
Ethan Allen	8:22
Tate Mayfairs	5:12
Masa Kitamiya	Pinfall
Marcus Mathers	8:13
Will Kroos	Pinfall
Charlie Sterling	Pinfall
Simon Miller	4:51
Jack Morris	6:59
Leon Slater	Pinfall
Kid Lykos II	8:35
Zozaya	Pinfall
Michael Oku	Pinfall
Kid Lykos	12:48
Trent Seven	Pinfall
Gene Munny	10:36

Quarterfinals; Chapter 180: Super Strong Style 16; Night 2; 5 May 2025
Man Like DeReiss	Pinfall
Masa Kitamiya	6:58
Will Kroos	7:09
Charlie Sterling	Pinfall
Leon Slater	Pinfall
Zozaya	9:21
Michael Oku	TKO
Trent Seven	5:43

Semifinals; Chapter 180: Super Strong Style 16; Night 2; 5 May 2025
Man Like DeReiss	Submission
Charlie Sterling	6:56
Leon Slater	Pinfall
Michael Oku	14:03

Final; Chapter 180: Super Strong Style 16; Night 2; 5 May 2025
Man Like DeReiss	Pinfall
Leon Slater	27:24
