= Super Strong Style 16 =

Annual independent wrestling tournament by Progress Wrestling

- Promotions: Progress Wrestling
- First event: 2015
- Event gimmick: Annual single elimination tournament

Super Strong Style 16 is an annual professional wrestling single elimination tournament produced by Progress Wrestling.

First introduced in 2015, the tournament comprises four rounds and features sixteen professional wrestlers who compete in singles matches. Since its inception, the tournament has been notable for featuring various professional wrestlers, who have gone on to achieve huge mainstream success, competing for promotions such as WWE, All Elite Wrestling and New Japan Pro-Wrestling. The tournament is used to determine the #1 contender for the PROGRESS World Championship. An exception was during the 2022 edition, where the title was declared vacant before the tournament and the title was decided in the tournament.

== Winners, dates, venues and main events ==
Year	Tournament winner		Date	City	Venue	Runner-up		Main event	Ref
Year	Men	Women	Date	City	Venue	Men	Women	Main event	Ref
2015	Will Ospreay	—N/a	24 May 2015	London, England	Electric Ballroom	Zack Sabre Jr.	—N/a	Regression (Jimmy Havoc and Paul Robinson) vs. The London Riots (James Davis and Rob Lynch)	
2015	Will Ospreay	—N/a	25 May 2015	London, England	Electric Ballroom	Zack Sabre Jr.	—N/a	Will Ospreay vs. Zack Sabre Jr. in the 2015 Super Strong Style 16 Tournament final	
2016	Tommy End	—N/a	29 May 2016	London, England	Electric Ballroom	Mark Andrews	—N/a	The Origin (El Ligero and Nathan Cruz) (c) vs. The London Riots (James Davis and Rob Lynch) for the PROGRESS Tag Team Championship	
2016	Tommy End	—N/a	30 May 2016	London, England	Electric Ballroom	Mark Andrews	—N/a	Tommy End vs. Mark Andrews in the 2016 Super Strong Style 16 Tournament final	
2017	Travis Banks	—N/a	27 May 2017	London, England	Electric Ballroom	Tyler Bate	—N/a	Matt Riddle vs. Trent Seven in the first round of the 2017 Super Strong Style 16 Tournament	
2017	Travis Banks	—N/a	28 May 2017	London, England	Electric Ballroom	Tyler Bate	—N/a	Laura Di Matteo vs. Jinny vs. Toni Storm in a three-way match for the inaugural PROGRESS Women's Championship in the Natural Progression Series IV final	
2017	Travis Banks	—N/a	29 May 2017	London, England	Electric Ballroom	Tyler Bate	—N/a	Travis Banks vs. Tyler Bate in the 2017 Super Strong Style 16 Tournament final	
2018	Zack Sabre Jr.	—N/a	5 May 2018	London, England	Alexandra Palace	Kassius Ohno	—N/a	Chris Brookes vs. Kassius Ohno in the first round of the 2018 Super Strong Style 16	
2018	Zack Sabre Jr.	—N/a	6 May 2018	London, England	Alexandra Palace	Kassius Ohno	—N/a	Travis Banks (c) vs. Walter for the PROGRESS World Championship	
2018	Zack Sabre Jr.	—N/a	7 May 2018	London, England	Alexandra Palace	Kassius Ohno	—N/a	Kassius Ohno vs. Zack Sabre Jr. in the 2018 Super Strong Style 16 Tournament final	
2019	David Starr	—N/a	4 May 2019	London, England	Alexandra Palace	Jordan Devlin	—N/a	Chris Ridgeway vs. Kyle O'Reilly in the first round of the 2019 Super Strong Style 16 Tournament	
2019	David Starr	—N/a	5 May 2019	London, England	Alexandra Palace	Jordan Devlin	—N/a	Walter (World Champion) vs. Trent Seven (Atlas Champion) in a Title unification match	
2019	David Starr	—N/a	6 May 2019	London, England	Alexandra Palace	Jordan Devlin	—N/a	David Starr vs. Jordan Devlin in the 2019 Super Strong Style 16 Tournament final	
2022	Chris Ridgeway	—N/a	3 June 2022	London, England	Electric Ballroom	Warren Banks	—N/a	Jack Evans vs. Johnny Progress in the first round of the 2022 Super Strong Style 16 Tournament	
2022	Chris Ridgeway	—N/a	4 June 2022	London, England	Electric Ballroom	Warren Banks	—N/a	Cara Noir vs. Spike Trivet in an "I Quit" Loser Leaves PROGRESS match	
2022	Chris Ridgeway	—N/a	5 June 2022	London, England	Electric Ballroom	Warren Banks	—N/a	Chris Ridgeway vs. Warren Banks for the vacant PROGRESS World Championship in the 2022 Super Strong Style 16 Tournament final	
2023	Kid Lykos	—N/a	27 May 2023	London, England	The Dome	Mark Haskins	—N/a	Will Ospreay vs. Tate Mayfairs in the first round of the 2023 Super Strong Style 16 Tournament	
2023	Kid Lykos	—N/a	28 May 2023	London, England	Electric Ballroom	Mark Haskins	—N/a	Sunshine Machine (Chuck Mambo and TK Cooper) (c) vs. Smokin' Aces (Charlie Sterling and Nick Riley) in a ladder match for the PROGRESS Tag Team Championship	
2023	Kid Lykos	—N/a	29 May 2023	London, England	Electric Ballroom	Mark Haskins	—N/a	Kid Lykos vs. Mark Haskins in the 2023 Super Strong Style 16 Tournament final	
2024	Luke Jacobs	—N/a	27 May 2024	London, England	Electric Ballroom	Ricky Knight Jr.	—N/a	Kid Lykos (c) vs. Mark Haskins for the PROGRESS World Championship	
2024	Luke Jacobs	—N/a	27 May 2024	London, England	Electric Ballroom	Ricky Knight Jr.	—N/a	Luke Jacobs vs. Ricky Knight Jr. in the 2024 Super Strong Style 16 Tournament final	
2025	Man Like DeReiss	—N/a	4 May 2025	London, England	Electric Ballroom	Leon Slater	—N/a	Nina Samuels (c) vs. Rhio in a Title vs. PROGRESS Career match for the PROGRESS Women's Championship	
2025	Man Like DeReiss	—N/a	5 May 2025	London, England	Electric Ballroom	Leon Slater	—N/a	Man Like DeReiss vs. Leon Slater in the 2024 Super Strong Style 16 Tournament final	
2026	Charles Crowley	Rhio	3 May 2026	London, England	Electric Ballroom	Charlie Sterling	Gisele Shaw	Man Like DeReiss (c) vs. Cara Noir for the PROGRESS World Championship	
2026	Charles Crowley	Rhio	4 May 2026	London, England	Electric Ballroom	Charlie Sterling	Gisele Shaw	Rhio vs. Gisele Shaw in the Women's Super Strong Style 16 Tournament final	

=== Championship match for winner ===
– Championship victory
– Championship match loss

#	Tournament winner	Championship	Event	Date	Result
1	Will Ospreay	PROGRESS World Championship	Chapter 20: Thunderbastard - Beyond Thunderbastard	26 July 2015	Defeated Jimmy Havoc in a no disqualification match.
2	Tommy End	PROGRESS World Championship	Chapter 32: 5000 To 1	26 June 2016	Lost to Marty Scurll.
3	Travis Banks	PROGRESS World Championship	Chapter 55: Chase The Sun	10 September 2017	Defeated Pete Dunne.
4	Zack Sabre Jr.	PROGRESS World Championship	Chapter 77: Pumpkin Spice PROGRESS	28 October 2018	Lost to Walter.
5	David Starr	PROGRESS World Championship	Chapter 95: Still Chasing	15 September 2019	Lost to Eddie Dennis in a three-way match that also involved Walter.
6	Kid Lykos	PROGRESS World Championship	Chapter 157: Hungry Like The Wolf	24 September 2023	Lost to Spike Trivet.
7	Luke Jacobs	PROGRESS World Championship	Chapter 169: The Devil On My Shoulder	28 July 2024	Defeated Kid Lykos.
8	Man Like DeReiss	PROGRESS World Championship	Chapter 183: Hundred Volts	25 August 2025	Defeated Luke Jacobs in a tables, ladders, and chairs match.

== Tournament history ==
=== 2015 ===
The inaugural Super Strong Style 16 Tournament took place at Chapter 19: Super Strong Style 16 at the Electric Ballroom in London, England across two nights between 24 May and 25 May 2015. The inaugural winner was Will Ospreay.

Tournament bracket

1st Round; Chapter 19: Super Strong Style 16; Night 1; 24 May 2015
Zack Sabre Jr.	Pinfall
Zack Gibson	15:48
Damo O'Connor	12:53
Tommaso Ciampa	Pinfall
Marty Scurll	Pinfall
Eddie Dennis	10:46
Noam Dar	10:43
Dave Mastiff	Referee's decision
Rampage Brown	Pinfall
Big Daddy Walter	7:26
Tommy End	17:51
Roderick Strong	Pinfall
Mark Haskins	Pinfall
Jack Gallagher	8:05
El Ligero	9:12
Will Ospreay	Pinfall

Quarterfinals; Chapter 19: Super Strong Style 16; Night 2; 25 May 2015
Zack Sabre Jr.	Pinfall
Tommaso Ciampa	15:48
Marty Scurll	Pinfall
Dave Mastiff	9:27
Rampage Brown	Pinfall
Roderick Strong	14:10
Mark Haskins	10:50
Will Ospreay	Pinfall

Semifinals; Chapter 19: Super Strong Style 16; Night 2; 25 May 2015
Zack Sabre Jr.	Pinfall
Marty Scurll	19:49
Roderick Strong	12:47
Will Ospreay	Pinfall

Final; Chapter 19: Super Strong Style 16; Night 2; 25 May 2015
Will Ospreay	Pinfall
Zack Sabre Jr.	17:58

=== 2016 ===
The 2016 edition of the tournament took place at Chapter 30: Super Strong Style 16 at the Electric Ballroom in London, England across two nights between 29 May and 30 May 2016. This tournament was won by Tommy End.

Tournament bracket

1st Round; Chapter 30: Super Strong Style 16; Nights 1–2; 29–30 May 2016
Big Daddy Walter	Pinfall
Dave Mastiff	11:13
Chris Hero	Pinfall
Mark Andrews	16:13
Matt Cross	10:06
Sami Callihan	Pinfall
Rampage Brown	7:29
Tommy End	Pinfall
Jack Gallagher	Pinfall
TK Cooper	6:21
Kenny Williams	10:24
Zack Gibson	Pinfall
Damon Moser	4:36
Mikey Whiplash	Pinfall
Mark Andrews	Pinfall (Note: This was a ten-way match for the final spot in the quarterfinals.)
Damon Moser Dave Mastiff El Ligero Kenny Williams Matt Cross Nathan Cruz Pete Dunne Rampage Brown TK Cooper	10:23 — — — — — — — —

Quarterfinals; Chapter 30: Super Strong Style 16; Night 2; 30 May 2016
Big Daddy Walter	11:54
Chris Hero	Pinfall
Sami Callihan	6:34
Tommy End	Pinfall
Jack Gallagher	13:19
Zack Gibson	Pinfall
Mikey Whiplash	1:44
Mark Andrews	Pinfall

Semifinals; Chapter 30: Super Strong Style 16; Night 2; 30 May 2016
Chris Hero	12:36
Tommy End	Pinfall
Zack Gibson	7:53
Mark Andrews	Pinfall

Finals; Chapter 30: Super Strong Style 16; Night 2; 30 May 2016
Tommy End	Pinfall
Mark Andrews	6:19

=== 2017 ===
The 2017 edition of the tournament took place at Chapter 49: Super Strong Style 16 at the Electric Ballroom in London, England across three nights between 27 May and 29 May 2017. This tournament was won by Travis Banks.

Tournament bracket

1st Round; Chapter 49: Super Strong Style 16; Night 1; 27 May 2017
Travis Banks	Pinfall
Jimmy Havoc	—
Mark Andrews	—
Flamita	Pinfall
Jack Sexsmith	Pinfall
Zack Gibson	—
David Starr	—
Zack Sabre Jr.	Pinfall
Matt Riddle	Pinfall
Trent Seven	0:06
Nathan Cruz	—
Jeff Cobb	Pinfall
Mark Haskins	Pinfall
Morgan Webster	—
William Eaver	—
Tyler Bate	Pinfall

Quarterfinals; Chapter 49: Super Strong Style 16; Night 2; 28 May 2017
Travis Banks	Pinfall
Flamita	—
Jack Sexsmith	—
Zack Sabre Jr.	Pinfall
Matt Riddle	Pinfall
Jeff Cobb	13:43
Mark Haskins	—
Tyler Bate	Pinfall

Semifinals; Chapter 49: Super Strong Style 16; Night 3; 29 May 2017
Travis Banks	Pinfall
Zack Sabre Jr.	—
Matt Riddle	14:13
Tyler Bate	Pinfall

Finals; Chapter 49: Super Strong Style 16; Night 3; 29 May 2017
Travis Banks	Pinfall
Tyler Bate	—

=== 2018 ===
The 2018 edition of the tournament took place at Chapter 49: Super Strong Style 68 at the Alexandra Palace in London, England across three nights between 5 May and 7 May 2018. This tournament was won by Zack Sabre Jr..

Tournament bracket

1st Round; Chapter 68: Super Strong Style 16; Night 1; 5 May 2018
Zack Sabre Jr.	Pinfall
Chuck Mambo	10:48
TK Cooper	9:44
David Starr	Pinfall
Angélico	Pinfall
Mark Andrews	14:16
Morgan Webster	14:16
Keith Lee	Pinfall
Zack Gibson	Pinfall
Joey Janela	0:14
Doug Williams	10:50
Pete Dunne	Pinfall
Kassius Ohno	Pinfall
Chris Brookes	21:52
Jordan Devlin	9:10
Tyler Bate	Pinfall

Quarterfinals; Chapter 68: Super Strong Style 16; Nights 2–3; 6–7 May 2018
Zack Sabre Jr.	Pinfall
David Starr	15:57
Angelico	14:35
Keith Lee	Pinfall
Zack Gibson	Disqualification
Pete Dunne	10:04
Kassius Ohno	15:00
Tyler Bate	Pinfall
Kassius Ohno	Win (Note: This was a Wasteman Challenge for the right to replace Tyler Bate in the semifinals.)
Angelico Chris Brookes Chuck Mambo David Starr Jordan Devlin Roy Johnson	— — — — — —

Semifinals; Chapter 68: Super Strong Style 16; Night 3; 7 May 2018
Zack Sabre Jr.	Pinfall
Keith Lee	12:22
Zack Gibson	11:18
Kassius Ohno (Note: Tyler Bate was unable to continue in the tournament. Kassius Ohno won a Wasteman Challenge to replace Bate in the semifinals.)	Pinfall

Final; Chapter 68: Super Strong Style 16; Night 3; 7 May 2018
Zack Sabre Jr.	Pinfall
Kassius Ohno	18:58

=== 2019 ===
The 2019 edition of the tournament took place at Chapter 88: Super Strong Style 16 at the Alexandra Palace in London, England across three nights between 4 May and 6 May 2019. The tournament was won by David Starr.

Tournament bracket

1st Round; Chapter 88: Super Strong Style 16; Night 1; 4 May 2019
Jordan Devlin	Pinfall
Lucky Kid	13:34
Daga	14:56
Kyle Fletcher	Pinfall
Paul Robinson	Pinfall
Darby Allin	10:40
Chris Ridgeway	19:19
Kyle O'Reilly	Pinfall
Ilja Dragunov	Pinfall
Chris Brookes	14:16
Aero Star	7:11
Trevor Lee	Pinfall
Travis Banks	Pinfall
DJZ	10:31
Artemis Spencer	7:59
David Starr	Pinfall

Quarterfinals; Chapter 88: Super Strong Style 16; Night 2; 5 May 2019
Jordan Devlin	Pinfall
Kyle Fletcher	13:09
Paul Robinson	17:43
Kyle O'Reilly	Pinfall
Ilja Dragunov	Pinfall
Trevor Lee	1:11
Travis Banks	Count out (13:40)
David Starr	Count out (13:40)

Semifinals; Chapter 88: Super Strong Style 16; Night 3; 6 May 2019
Jordan Devlin	Pinfall
Kyle O'Reilly	17:59
Ilja Dragunov Travis Banks	9:46 —
David Starr	Pinfall (Note: This was a three-way elimination match. Order of elimination: Ilja Dragunov, Travis Banks)

Final; Chapter 88: Super Strong Style 16; Night 3; 6 May 2019
Jordan Devlin	21:03
David Starr	Pinfall

=== 2022 ===
The tournament was used to crown the new PROGRESS World Champion after previous champion Jonathan Gresham was stripped off the title due to Lykos Gym attacking Gresham's opponent Gene Munny at Chapter 134: No Mountain High Enough. The match stipulated that Gresham would lose the title if he got disqualified. The tournament was held across three nights between 3 June and 5 June 2022 at the Electric Ballroom in London, England and won by Chris Ridgeway.

Tournament bracket

1st Round; Chapter 135: Super Strong Style 16 – Night 1; 3 June 2022 (Aired: 18 June)
Dean Allmark	11:17
Chris Ridgeway	Pinfall
Charlie Dempsey	Pinfall
Charles Crowley	12:44
Malik	Pinfall
Callum Newman	11:23
Rickey Shane Page	14:32
Gene Munny	Pinfall
Robbie X	9:53
Aramis	Pinfall
Jack Evans	12:06
Johnny Progress	Pinfall
Kid Lykos	Pinfall
Maggot	10:26
Big Damo	8:42
Warren Banks	Pinfall

Quarterfinals; Chapter 135: Super Strong Style 16 – Night 2; 4 June 2022 (Aired: 25 June)
Chris Ridgeway	Pinfall
Charlie Dempsey	11:06
Malik	9:24
Gene Munny	Pinfall
Aramis	9:55
Johnny Progress	Pinfall
Kid Lykos	5:10
Warren Banks	Pinfall

Semifinals; Chapter 135: Super Strong Style 16 – Night 3; 5 June 2022 (Aired: 2 July)
Chris Ridgeway	Pinfall
Gene Munny	11:10
Johnny Progress	10:26
Warren Banks	Pinfall

Final; Chapter 135: Super Strong Style 16 – Night 3; 5 June 2022 (Aired: 2 July)
Chris Ridgeway	Pinfall
Warren Banks	21:46

=== 2023 ===
The 2023 edition of the tournament took place at Chapter 153: Super Strong Style 16 in London, England across three nights between 27 May and 29 May 2023. The first night was held at The Dome, while the rest of the event was held at the Electric Ballroom. The tournament was won by Kid Lykos.

=== 2024 ===
The 2024 edition of the tournament took place at Chapter 168: Super Strong Style 16 at the Electric Ballroom in London, England across two nights between 26 May and 27 May 2024. The tournament was won by Luke Jacobs.

=== 2025 ===
The 2025 edition of the tournament took place at Chapter 180: Super Strong Style 16 at the Electric Ballroom in London, England across two nights between 4 May and 5 May 2025. The tournament was won by Man Like DeReiss.

=== 2026 ===
The 2026 edition of the competition featured the first-ever women's tournament along with the annual men's tournament. Both of the tournament's first round bouts were held under the "blockbuster" type of matches and took place both inside and outside of Progress events. The winner of the men's tournament was Charles Crowley, while the inaugural winner of the women's tournament was Rhio.

== See also ==
- List of Progress Wrestling tournaments
