= Progress Chapter 169: The Devil On My Shoulder =

2024 Progress Wrestling event

- Promotional poster of the event
- Promotion: Progress Wrestling
- Date: July 28, 2024
- City: London, England
- Venue: Electric Ballroom
- Attendance: ~700

Event chronology
← Previous; Super Strong Style 16	Next → Chapter 170: Wrestling Never Sleeps

The Progress Chapter 169: The Devil On My Shoulder was a professional wrestling event produced by Progress Wrestling. It took place on July 28, 2024, in London, England at Electric Ballroom.

Ten matches were contested at the event, including one on the pre-show. The main event saw Luke Jacobs defeat Kid Lykos to win the PROGRESS World Championship.

== Production ==
=== Storylines ===
The event included matches that each resulted from scripted storylines, where wrestlers portrayed heroes, villains, or less distinguishable characters in scripted events that built tension and culminated in a wrestling match or series of matches. Results were predetermined by Progress' creative writers, while storylines were produced on Progress' events airing on the Demand PROGRESS streaming service.

The event featured the presence of Danhausen in one of the bouts.

=== Event ===
The event started with the preshow singles confrontation between Taishi Ozawa and Saxon Huxley solded with the victory of the latter.

The first main card bout saw Axel Tischer successfully defending the Progress Atlas Championship successfully for the first time in that respective reign against Mike D Vecchio. After the bout concluded, Tischer was jumped by the returning tag team of Smokin' Aces (Charlie Sterling and Nick Riley). In the third bout, Man Like DeReiss defeated Kid Lykos II in singles competition. Next up, Gene Munny defeated Danhausen in another singles bout, after Munny received help from Taishi Ozawa. The fifth match saw Paul Robinson successfully defending the Progress Proteus Championship for the ninth time in that respective reign against Malik in a hardcore match. The sixth bout saw Bussy (Allie Katch and Effy) falling short to Charles Crowley and a returning Session Moth Martina who was a mystery partner for Crowley until the bery beginning of the match. After the bout concluded, Martina turned on Crowley after attacking him. In the seventh bout, TNA Wrestling's Leon Slater defeated Aigle Blanc in singles competition. In the eighth bout, LA Taylor and Skye Smitson defeated Lana Austin and Rob Drake in tag team competition, ending a feud between themselves and Austin after the latter turned on them weeks prior to the event, thus ending the "Lana Austin Experience" stable. Taylor and Smitson went under the tag name of "The Experience" ever since. In the semi main event, Rhio defeated Lena Kross to secure the eleventh consecutive defense of the Progress World Women's Championship in that respective reign.

In the main event, 2024 Super Strong Style 16 tournament winner Luke Jacobs defeated Kid Lykos to win the PROGRESS World Championship, ending the latter's reign at 154 days and three successful defenses.

== Results ==
No.	Results	Stipulations	Times
1^{P}	Saxon Huxley defeated Taishi Ozawa by pinfall	Singles match	8:10
2	Axel Tischer (c) defeated Mike D Vecchio by pinfall	Singles match for the Progress Atlas Championship	15:21
3	Man Like DeReiss defeated Kid Lykos II by pinfall	Singles match	9:36
4	Gene Munny defeated Danhausen by pinfall	Singles match	9:19
5	Paul Robinson (c) defeated Malik by referee decision	Hardcore match for the Progress Proteus Championship	21:21
6	Charles Crowley and Session Moth Martina defeated Bussy (Allie Katch and Effy) by pinfall	Tag team match	7:06
7	Leon Slater defeated Aigle Blanc by pinfall	Singles match	11:13
8	The Experience (LA Taylor and Skye Smitson) defeated Lana Austin and Rob Drake by pinfall	Tag team match	14:02
9	Rhio (c) defeated Lena Kross by pinfall	Singles match for the Progress World Women's Championship	11:53
10	Luke Jacobs defeated Kid Lykos (c) by pinfall	Singles match for the PROGRESS World Championship	9:22
(c) / – the champion(s) heading into the match; P / – the match was broadcast on the pre-show
