= Super Strong Style 16 (2024) =

2024 professional wrestling tournament by Progress Wrestling

- Promotional poster
- Promotion: Progress Wrestling
- Date: Night One: May 26, 2024; Night Two: May 27, 2024
- City: London, England
- Venue: Electric Ballroom
- Attendance: Night One: cca. 500; Night Two: cca. 600; Combined: cca.1100

Event chronology
← Previous; Chapter 167: One Bump Or Two?	Next → Chapter 169: The Devil On My Shoulder

Super Strong Style 16 chronology
← Previous; 2023	Next → 2025

The 2024 Super Strong Style 16 was the eighth Super Strong Style 16 professional wrestling tournament produced by Progress Wrestling. It was a two-night event, which took place on May 26 and 27, 2024 and was held at the Electric Ballroom in London, England.

The card comprised a total of 19 matches, with nine on the first night and ten on the second. In the main event for Night 1, Kid Lykos defeated Mark Haskins to retain the PROGRESS World Championship. In the main event for Night 2, Luke Jacobs defeated Ricky Knight Jr. to win the Super Strong Style 16 tournament, becoming the number one contender to the PROGRESS World Championship.

== Production ==
=== Storylines ===
The event included matches that each resulted from scripted storylines, where wrestlers portrayed heroes, villains, or less distinguishable characters in scripted events that built tension and culminated in a wrestling match or series of matches. Results were predetermined by Progress' creative writers, while storylines were produced on Progress' events airing on the Demand PROGRESS streaming service.

On April 26, 2024, it was announced that ex-WWE superstar Shelton Benjamin was making his Progress Wrestling debut by being presented as a Super Strong Style 16 competitor. On the first night of the event from May 26, Simon Miller pulled out of the competition due to injury and was immediately replaced by Jack Bandicoot.

== Results ==
Night 1 (May 26)
No.	Results	Stipulations	Times
1	Man Like DeReiss defeated Aigle Blanc by pinfall	First round match in the Super Strong Style 16 tournament	12:10
2	Ricky Knight Jr. defeated Jack Bandicoot by pinfall	First round match in the Super Strong Style 16 tournament	7:36
3	Eddie Dennis defeated TK Cooper by pinfall	First round match in the Super Strong Style 16 tournament	7:46
4	Tate Mayfairs defeated KC Navarro by pinfall	First round match in the Super Strong Style 16 tournament	7:59
5	Shelton Benjamin defeated Leon Slater by pinfall	First round match in the Super Strong Style 16 tournament	5:35
6	Kid Lykos II defeated Gene Munny by pinfall	First round match in the Super Strong Style 16 tournament	9:24
7	Luke Jacobs defeated Mike D Vecchio by pinfall	First round match in the Super Strong Style 16 tournament	10:58
8	Mike Santana defeated Connor Mills by pinfall	First round match in the Super Strong Style 16 tournament	11:57
9	Kid Lykos (c) defeated Mark Haskins by pinfall	Singles match for the PROGRESS World Championship	29:58
(c) / – the champion(s) heading into the match

Night 2 (May 27)
No.	Results	Stipulations	Times
1	Eddie Dennis defeated Tate Mayfairs by pinfall	Quarterfinal match in the Super Strong Style 16 tournament	—
2	Ricky Knight Jr. defeated Mike Santana by pinfall	Quarterfinal match in the Super Strong Style 16 tournament	4:43
3	Man Like DeReiss defeated Shelton Benjamin by disqualification	Quarterfinal match in the Super Strong Style 16 tournament	11:32
4	Luke Jacobs defeated Kid Lykos II by pinfall	Quarterfinal match in the Super Strong Style 16 tournament	7:56
5	Luke Jacobs defeated Eddie Dennis by pinfall	Semifinal match in the Super Strong Style 16 tournament	6:31
6	Ricky Knight Jr. defeated Man Like DeReiss by pinfall	Semifinal match in the Super Strong Style 16 tournament	7:43
7	Rhio (c) defeated Nina Samuels, Lizzy Evo and Kanji	Ladder match for the Progress Wrestling World Women's Championship	25:46
8	Axel Tischer defeated Yoichi (c) by pinfall	Singles match for the Progress Wrestling Atlas Championship	12:36
9	Gene Munny won by last eliminating TK Cooper (Note: Match also involved Leon Slater, KC Navarro, Connor Mills, Mike D Vecchio, Aigle Blanc and Taishi Ozawa.)	Rufus Hound invitational battle royal	11:13
10	Luke Jacobs defeated Ricky Knight Jr. by pinfall	Super Strong Style 16 tournament final	21:29
(c) / – the champion(s) heading into the match

=== Tournament bracket ===
1st Round; Chapter 168: Super Strong Style 16; Night 1; 26 May 2024
Shelton Benjamin	Pinfall
Leon Slater	5:35
Aigle Blanc	12:10
Man Like DeReiss	Pinfall
Mike Santana	Pinfall
Connor Mills	11:57
Jack Bandicoot	7:36
Ricky Knight Jr.	Pinfall
Tate Mayfairs	Pinfall
KC Navarro	7:59
TK Cooper	7:46
Eddie Dennis	Pinfall
Kid Lykos II	Pinfall
Gene Munny	9:24
Mike D Vecchio	10:58
Luke Jacobs	Pinfall

Quarterfinals; Chapter 168: Super Strong Style 16; Night 2; 27 May 2024
Shelton Benjamin	11:32
Man Like DeReiss	Disqualification
Mike Santana	4:43
Ricky Knight Jr.	Pinfall
Tate Mayfairs	—
Eddie Dennis	Pinfall
Kid Lykos II	7:56
Luke Jacobs	Pinfall

Semifinals; Chapter 168: Super Strong Style 16; Night 2; 27 May 2024
Man Like DeReiss	7:43
Ricky Knight Jr.	Pinfall
Eddie Dennis	6:31
Luke Jacobs	Pinfall

Final; Chapter 168: Super Strong Style 16; Night 2; 27 May 2024
Ricky Knight Jr.	21:29
Luke Jacobs	Pinfall
