= Super Strong Style 16 (2023) =

2023 professional wrestling tournament by Progress Wrestling

- Promotional poster
- Promotion: Progress Wrestling
- Date: Night One: May 27, 2023; Night Two: May 28, 2023; Night Three: May 29, 2023
- City: London, England
- Venue: Night One: The Dome; Night Two and Three: Electric Ballroom

Event chronology
| ← Previous; Chapter 152: For The Love Of Progress | Next → DEFY x Progress Toronto |

Super Strong Style 16 chronology
| ← Previous; 2022 | Next → 2024 |

Chapter 153: Super Strong Style 16 Tournament Edition 2023, simply known as the 2023 Super Strong Style 16 was the seventh Super Strong Style 16 professional wrestling tournament produced by Progress Wrestling. It was a three-night event, which took place between May 27 and May 29, 2023. The first night of the event was held at The Dome in London, England, while the second two nights were held at the Electric Ballroom in London, England.

Kid Lykos won the tournament by defeating Mark Haskins in the final, with Nigel McGuinness serving as the special guest referee. The tournament was notable for featuring the return of Will Ospreay (of New Japan Pro-Wrestling fame) to Progress after a four-year absence. Ospreay reunited with Paul Robinson as The Swords of Essex, with Robinson also returning to the promotion after a two-year absence. At the event, they teamed with Callum Newman to defeat CPF (Danny Black, Joe Lando and Maverick Mayhew). Aside from that, Smokin' Aces (Charlie Sterling and Nick Riley) defeated Sunshine Machine (Chuck Mambo and TK Cooper) in a ladder match to win the Tag Team Championship, Lana Austin retained the World Women's Championship against Millie McKenzie and Alexxis Falcon defeated Nina Samuels in a Clock Strikes Midnight match.

== Production ==
=== Background ===
On November 30, 2022, Progress Wrestling announces the dates and venues for its various events to be held in 2023 and the 2023 edition of the Super Strong Style 16 was scheduled to be held as a three-night event between May 27 and May 29. The first night of the tournament was scheduled to take place at The Dome in London. It was later announced that the second two nights on May 28 and May 29 would be held at the Electric Ballroom in London.

=== Storylines ===
The event included matches that each resulted from scripted storylines, where wrestlers portrayed heroes, villains, or less distinguishable characters in scripted events that built tension and culminated in a wrestling match or series of matches. Results were predetermined by Progress' creative writers, while storylines were produced on Progress' events airing on the Demand PROGRESS streaming service.

At Chapter 143: The Deadly Viper Tour - Codename: Sidewinder, Nina Samuels made her return to Progress after a three-year absence and defeated Taonga. Alexxis Falcon then interrupted Samuels and insulted her after the match. This led to Samuels facing Falcon in a match at Chapter 145: Wrestling Witch Face - Trick Or Treat, which Samuels won by using underhanded tactics, but Falcon attacked her after the match, forcing her to bleed. The rivalry continued as the two faced off in a Three Way match, also involving Lizzy Evo at Chapter 147: Unboxing Live V - Deal Or No Deal. Evo won the match and Falcon extended a handshake to Samuels to end the rivalry but Samuels attacked her and hit her in the throat with a steel chair. Samuels and Falcon had a rematch at Chapter 150: When The Man Comes Around, which Samuels won by disqualification after Falcon tripped her in the corner and attacked her refusing to listen to the referee's count. It was later announced that Falcon and Samuels would compete in the first-ever Clock Strikes Midnight match at Super Strong Style 16.

On February 26, 2023, Progress generated hype for the Super Strong Style 16 event by announcing that Nigel McGuinness would appear at the event.

After defeating Lizzy Evo at Chapter 150: When The Man Comes Around, Millie McKenzie began pursuing the Progress World Women's Championship. She would then defeat Lana Austin Experience members Skye Smitson at Chapter 151: Heavy Metal and LA Taylor at Chapter 152: For The Love Of Progress, to earn a World Women's Championship match against Austin at Super Strong Style 16.

== Aftermath ==
The Progress World Champion Spike Trivet responded to Kid Lykos' Super Strong Style 16 victory, stating that he did not consider Lykos a threat to his title reign, setting the stage for a future title match between the two. After months of feuding, the title match took place at Chapter 157: Hungry Like The Wolf, where Trivet retained the title.

== Results ==
Night 1 (May 27)
| No. | Results | Stipulations | Times |
|---|---|---|---|
| 1 | Mark Haskins defeated Leon Slater | First round match in the Super Strong Style 16 tournament | 14:24 |
| 2 | Charles Crowley defeated Danny Black | First round match in the Super Strong Style 16 tournament | 3:56 |
| 3 | Shigehiro Irie defeated Man Like DeReiss | First round match in the Super Strong Style 16 tournament | 13:15 |
| 4 | Luke Jacobs defeated Rampage Brown | First round match in the Super Strong Style 16 tournament | 10:59 |
| 5 | Kid Lykos defeated Big Damo | First round match in the Super Strong Style 16 tournament | 11:09 |
| 6 | Nathan Cruz defeated Maggot | First round match in the Super Strong Style 16 tournament | — |
| 7 | Nick Wayne defeated Robbie X | First round match in the Super Strong Style 16 tournament | — |
| 8 | Will Ospreay defeated Tate Mayfairs | First round match in the Super Strong Style 16 tournament | 20:36 |

Night 2 (May 28)
| No. | Results | Stipulations | Times |
|---|---|---|---|
| 1 | Robbie X defeated Danny Black, Maggot and Tate Mayfairs | Four Way match | 18:36 |
| 2 | Kid Lykos defeated Nick Wayne | Quarterfinal match in the Super Strong Style 16 tournament | 16:00 |
| 3 | The 0121 (Leon Slater and Man Like DeReiss) defeated Big Damo and Rampage Brown | Tag team match | 15:39 |
| 4 | Nathan Cruz defeated Will Ospreay by disqualification | Quarterfinal match in the Super Strong Style 16 tournament | 21:06 |
| 5 | Mark Haskins defeated Charles Crowley | Quarterfinal match in the Super Strong Style 16 tournament | 19:27 |
| 6 | Lana Austin (c) defeated Millie McKenzie | Singles match for the Progress World Women's Championship | 13:05 |
| 7 | Luke Jacobs defeated Shigehiro Irie | Quarterfinal match in the Super Strong Style 16 tournament | 13:52 |
| 8 | Smokin' Aces (Charlie Sterling and Nick Riley) defeated Sunshine Machine (Chuck Mambo and TK Cooper) (c) | Ladder match for the Progress Tag Team Championship | 33:00 |
(c) / – the champion(s) heading into the match

Night 3 (May 29)
| No. | Results | Stipulations |
|---|---|---|
| 1 | Rampage Brown won by last eliminating Tate Mayfairs (Note: Order of elimination: Charles Crowley, Maggot, Bullit, Big Damo, Robbie X, Man Like DeReiss, Leon Slater, Shigehiro Irie and Nick Wayne) | Simon Miller's Ups and Downs Battle Royal |
| 2 | Mark Haskins defeated Luke Jacobs | Semifinal match in the Super Strong Style 16 tournament |
| 3 | Kid Lykos defeated Nathan Cruz | Semifinal match in the Super Strong Style 16 tournament |
| 4 | Alexxis Falcon defeated Nina Samuels | Clock Strikes Midnight match |
| 5 | Callum Newman and The Swords of Essex (Paul Robinson and Will Ospreay) defeated CPF (Danny Black, Joe Lando and Maverick Mayhew) | Six-man tag team match |
| 6 | Spike Trivet defeated Connor Mills | Singles match |
| 7 | Kid Lykos defeated Mark Haskins | Super Strong Style 16 tournament final Nigel McGuinness was the special guest referee. |

=== Super Strong Style 16 Tournament ===
1st Round; Chapter 153: Super Strong Style 16; Night 1; 27 May 2023
Big Damo | 11:09
Kid Lykos | Pinfall
Robbie X | —
Nick Wayne | Pinfall
Nathan Cruz | Pinfall
Maggot | —
Will Ospreay | Pinfall
Tate Mayfairs | 20:36
Mark Haskins | Pinfall
Leon Slater | 14:24
Danny Black | 3:56
Charles Crowley | Pinfall
Shigehiro Irie | Pinfall
Man Like DeReiss | 13:15
Rampage Brown | 10:59
Luke Jacobs | Pinfall

Quarterfinals; Chapter 153: Super Strong Style 16; Night 2; 28 May 2023
Kid Lykos | Pinfall
Nick Wayne | 16:00
Nathan Cruz | Disqualification
Will Ospreay | 21:06
Mark Haskins | Pinfall
Charles Crowley | 19:27
Shigehiro Irie | 13:52
Luke Jacobs | Pinfall

Semifinals; Chapter 153: Super Strong Style 16; Night 3; 29 May 2023
Kid Lykos | Pinfall
Nathan Cruz | —
Mark Haskins | Pinfall
Luke Jacobs | —

Final; Chapter 153: Super Strong Style 16; Night 3; 29 May 2023
Kid Lykos | Pinfall
Mark Haskins | —
