= Ethan Allen (wrestler) =

English professional wrestler

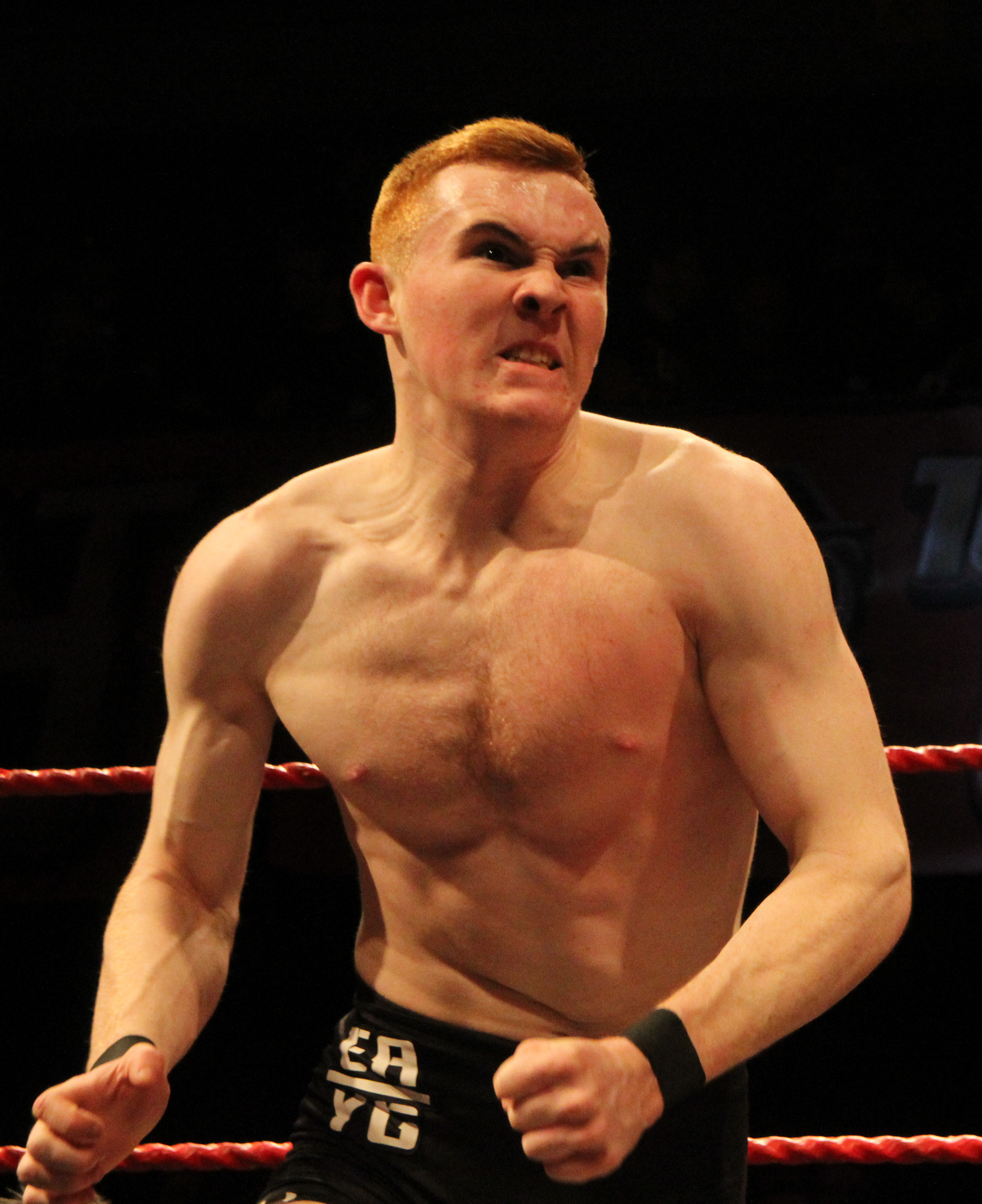
- Allen in March 2020

Personal information
- Born: July 12, 2001 (age 25) Manchester, England

Professional wrestling career
- Ring name: Ethan Allen
- Debut: 2018

Ethan Allen (born July 12, 2001) is an English professional wrestler, currently working as a freelancer on the independent circuit – predominantly for Revolution Pro Wrestling (RevPro) where is a former one-time and longest reign Undisputed British Tag Team Champions alongside Luke Jacobs. He as one-half of "The Young Guns" alongside Jacobs.

== Professional wrestling career ==
=== British independent scene (2018–present) ===
Allen is known for competing in various of the British independent scene. He made his professional wrestling debut at a house show promoted by Fighting Spirit Wrestling Academy on March 9, 2018, where he teamed up with Danny Hope and Will Simpson as "Team Hope" in a losing effort against "Team Bailey" (Robert Dreissker, Sam Bailey and an undisclosed competitor) in six-man tag team competition.

At Royal Quest II, an event promoted by New Japan Pro Wrestling on British territory on October 2, 2022, Jacobs teamed up with Luke Jacobs in a losing effort against Los Ingobernables de Japon (Sanada and Hiromu Takahashi).

=== Future Shock Wrestling (2018–2021) ===
Allen made his professional wrestling debut in Future Shock Wrestling at FutureShock UnderGround #27 on June 16, 2018, where he teamed up with Luke Jacobs and Ashton Smith to defeat Cyanide and WonderLand (Henry T. Grodd and Noah) in a six-man tag team match.

=== Revolution Pro Wrestling (2021–present) ===
Allen made his debut in Revolution Pro Wrestling at RevPro Live In Bristol 3 on July 18, 2021, where he teamed up with Luke Jacobs and fell short to The Dream Team (Dean Allmark and Robbie X) in one of the 2021 edition of the "Great British Tag League" block A matches. Allen and Jacobs continued their evolution in the tournament by falling short to Destination Everywhere (Connor Mills and Michael Oku) at RevPro Live At The Cockpit 52 on August 1, and defeated Lykos Gym (Kid Lykos and Kid Lykos II) at RevPro Pop-Up Show on August 15, 2021, finishing the tournament with a total of three points. At RevPro Live At NOT The Cockpit 53 on Allen teamed up with Jacobs again to unsuccessfully challenge Destination Everywhere (Connor Mills and Michael Oku) for the British Tag Team Championship.

Allen competed in various of the promotion's signature events. He competed for the first time in the British J-Cup series of events at the 2025 edition of the tournament in which he fell short to Nino Bryant in the first rounds. In the Great British Tag League, Allen teamed up with Luke Jacobs at the inaugural edition of 2021, where they placed themselves in the A block, scoring a total of three points against the teams of Destination Everywhere (Connor Mills and Michael Oku), The Dream Team (Dean Allmark and Robbie X) and Lykos Gym (Kid Lykos and Kid Lykos II). At High Stakes on September 19, 2021, Allen and Luke Jacobs defeated Sunshine Machine (Chuck Mambo and TK Cooper), Two Extremely Athletic Men (Kenneth Halfpenny and Shaun Jackson), and Brendan White and Doug Williams in four-way tag team competition.

=== Progress Wrestling (2021–present) ===
Allen made his debut in Progress Wrestling at Chapter 104: Natural Progression on February 20, 2021, where he competed in the first rounds of the Natural Progression Series, where he defeated Kid Lykos II. One week later at PROGRESS Chapter 105: Bring The Thunder on February 27, 2021, Allen fell short to Luke Jacobs in the semifinals.

Allen and Luke Jacobs competed in a tournament for the vacant PROGRESS Tag Team Championship in which they defeated Chris Ridgeway and Danny Black in the first rounds from PROGRESS Chapter 108: Of Course You Realize This Means War on April 10, 2021, Sunshine Machine (TK Cooper and Chuck Mambo at PROGRESS Chapter 110: Skeleton Head from May 8, 2021, in the semifinals, but fell short to Lykos Gym (Kid Lykos and Kid Lykos II) at PROGRESS Chapter 112: The Flowers Are Still Standing on June 5, 2021, in the finals. In the 2025 Super Strong Style 16, Allen fell short to Man Like DeReiss in the first rounds.

=== Westside Xtreme Wrestling (2020) ===
Allen beirfly competed in the German promotion Westside Xtreme Wrestling. He made his first appearance on the second night of the 2020 edition of the 16 Carat Gold Tournament, where he teamed up with Luke Jacobs to defeat Avalanche and Black Taurus, Chris Ridgeway and Scotty Davis, D.J. Hyde and Levaniel, Julian Pace and Puma King, Leon van Gasteren and Lucky Kid, and Norman Harras and Tarik in a gauntlet tag team match. One night later at wXw We Love Wrestling #1, Allen and Jacobs unsuccessfully challenged Jay-AA (Absolute Andy and Jay Skillet) for the wXw World Tag Team Championship.

== Championships and accomplishments ==
- British Wrestling Revolution
  - Youth In Revolt Tournament (2019)
- FutureShock Wrestling
  - FSW Tag Team Championship (1 time) – with Luke Jacobs
- Infinite Promotions
  - Infinite Tag Team Championship (1 time) – with Luke Jacobs
- Pro Wrestling Illustrated
  - Ranked No. 206 of the top 500 singles wrestlers in the PWI 500 in 2021
- Progress Wrestling
  - Progress Tag Team Championship (1 time) – with Luke Jacobs
- Revolution Pro Wrestling
  - Undisputed British Tag Team Championship (1 time) – with Luke Jacobs
