= Progress Chapter 157: Hungry Like The Wolf =

2023 Progress Wrestling event

- Promotional poster of the event
- Promotion: Progress Wrestling
- Date: 24 September (Aired 29 September 2023)
- City: London, England
- Venue: Electric Ballroom

Event chronology
← Previous; Chapter 156: Steal Yourself	Next → Chapter 158: The Long Halloween

The Chapter Chapter 157: Hungry Like The Wolf was a professional wrestling event produced by Progress Wrestling. It took place on 24 September 2023, in London, England at Electric Ballroom.

Nine matches were contested at the event. In the main event, Spike Trivet defeated Kid Lykos to retain the PROGRESS World Championship.

== Production ==
=== Storylines ===
The event included matches that each resulted from scripted storylines, where wrestlers portrayed heroes, villains, or less distinguishable characters in scripted events that built tension and culminated in a wrestling match or series of matches. Results were predetermined by Progress' creative writers, while storylines were produced on Progress' events airing on the Demand PROGRESS streaming service.

The event was also streamed on Wrestle Universe.

=== Event ===
The event started with the tag team confrontation in which Leon Slater and Man Like DeReiss successfully defended the ASCA Tag Team Championship against Malik and Paul Robinson. Next up, Jack Bandicoot picked up a victory over Rob Drake in singles competition. The third bout saw Skye Smitson outmatching Allie Katch in another singles competition bout. Next up, Blake Christian defeated Charles Crowley to retain Game Changer Wrestling's GCW World Championship. The fifth match saw Charlie Sterling and Nick Riley defeat Connor Mills and Gene Munny to secure the first successful defense of the PROGRESS Tag Team Championship in that respective reign. Next up, Tate Mayfairs defeated Simon Miller in singles competition. The eighth bout saw LA Taylor defeat Renee Michelle in another singles competition bout. In the semi main event, Yoshiki Inamura defeated TK Cooper.

In the main event, Spike Trivet defeated Kid Lykos to secure the fourteenth consecutive defense of the PROGRESS World Championship in that respective reign.

== Results ==
No.	Results	Stipulations	Times
1	Boisterous Behaviour (Leon Slater and Man Like DeReiss) (c) defeated Malik and Paul Robinson by pinfall	Tag team match for the ASCA Tag Team Championship	11:58
2	Jack Bandicoot defeated Rob Drake by pinfall	Singles match	8:40
3	Skye Smitson defeated Allie Katch by pinfall	Singles match	9:26
4	Blake Christian (c) defeated Charles Crowley by pinfall	Singles match for the GCW World Championship	11:49
5	Smokin' Aces (Charlie Sterling and Nick Riley) (c) defeated Connor Mills and Gene Munny by pinfall	Tag team match for the PROGRESS Tag Team Championship	12:21
6	Tate Mayfairs defeated Simon Miller by pinfall	Singles match	7:10
7	LA Taylor (with Lana Austin and Skye Smitson) defeated Renee Michelle by pinfall	Singles match	9:16
8	Yoshiki Inamura defeated TK Cooper by pinfall	Singles match	11:55
9	Spike Trivet (c) defeated Kid Lykos by pinfall	Singles match for the PROGRESS World Championship	31:26
(c) / – the champion(s) heading into the match
