= Dragon Lee =

Dragon Lee may refer to:

- Dragon Lee (actor) (born 1958), South Korean-Hong Kong actor and martial artist
- Dragon Lee (wrestler) (born 1995), Mexican masked professional wrestler
- Dralístico (born 1991), Mexican masked professional wrestler, who originally worked under the ring name Dragon Lee
