= Natural Progression Series =

Annual independent wrestling tournament by Progress Wrestling

Natural Progression Series was a professional wrestling tournament produced by Progress Wrestling, annually since 2012. The tournament showcased upstart rising wrestlers from the United Kingdom. The winner received a championship match of their choosing at any time and any place. The winner also got to name a participant of their choosing in the next Natural Progression Series.

== List of winners ==
#	Winner	Tournament Final			Runner-up	Ref
#	Winner	Event	Date	Location	Runner-up	Ref
I	Mark Andrews	Chapter Ten: Glory Follows Virtue As If It Were Its Shadow	24 November 2013	London, England	Paul Robinson	
II	Morgan Webster	Chapter 17: Harder, Better, Faster, Stronger	25 January 2015	London, England	Zack Gibson	
III	William Eaver	Chapter 29: Practically PROGRESS In Every Way	24 April 2016	London, England	Damon Moser	
IV	Toni Storm	Chapter 49: Super Strong Style 16	28 May 2017	London, England	Jinny	
IV	Toni Storm	Chapter 49: Super Strong Style 16	28 May 2017	London, England	Laura Di Matteo	
V	Mark Davis	Chapter 72: Got Got Need	24 June 2018	London, England	Chris Ridgeway	
VI	Scotty Davis	Natural Progression Series 6	14 September 2019	London, England	Danny Duggan	
VII	Luke Jacobs	Chapter 105: Bring the Thunder	27 February 2021	London, England	Warren Banks	
8	Ricky Knight Jr.	Chapter 146: They Think It's All Over...	27 November 2022	London, England	Tate Mayfairs	

=== Championship opportunity ===
– Championship victory
– Tournament was for a championship
– Championship match loss

#	Winner	Championship	Event	Date	Result	Ref
1	Mark Andrews	Progress Championship	Chapter Ten: Glory Follows Virtue As If It Were Its Shadow	24 November 2013	Defeated Rampage Brown.	
2	Morgan Webster	Progress Championship	Chapter 24: Hit The North	6 December 2015	Defeated Will Ospreay and Zack Gibson in a three-way match. (Note: Morgan Webster was inserted into Will Ospreay's Progress Championship defense against Zack Gibson, turning the match into a three-way match. This decision was due to Webster losing the Natural Progression Series trophy to Gibson caused by outside interference at Chapter 23: What A Time To Be Alive!.)	
3	Pastor William Eaver	Progress World Championship	Chapter 32: 5000 To 1	26 June 2016	Defeated Marty Scurll.	
4	Toni Storm	Inaugural Progress Women's Championship	Chapter 49: Super Strong Style 16; Night 2	28 May 2017	Defeated Jinny and Laura Di Matteo in a three-way match in the Natural Progression Series IV final.	
5	Mark Davis	Progress Tag Team Championship	Chapter 87: Breadknife	31 March 2019	Aussie Open (Mark Davis and Kyle Fletcher) defeated The Swords of Essex (Will Ospreay and Paul Robinson) in a ladder match.	
6	Scotty Davis	Progress Tag Team Championship	Chapter 95: Still Chasing	15 September 2019	Scotty Davis and Jordan Devlin defeated Grizzled Young Veterans (James Drake and Zack Gibson) and Aussie Open (Mark Davis and Kyle Fletcher) in a three-way tag team match.	
7	Luke Jacobs	Progress World Championship	Chapter 106: Stick A Pony In Me Pocket	13 March 2021	Lost to Cara Noir.	
8	Ricky Knight Jr.	Progress Atlas Championship	Chapter 150: When The Man Comes Around	26 February 2023	Defeated Big Damo.	

== Tournament history ==
=== Natural Progression Series I ===
The inaugural Natural Progression Series took place from 25 November 2012 to 24 November 2013 across various Progress Wrestling events. The inaugural winner was Mark Andrews.

Tournament bracket

1st Round
PROGRESS Chapter Four (25 November 2012)
Mark Andrews	Pinfall
Will Ospreay	10:31
PROGRESS Chapter Five (27 January 2013)
Mike Hitchman	11:24
Jonathan Windsor	Pinfall
PROGRESS Chapter Six (31 March 2013)
MK McKinnan	7:40
Paul Robinson	Pinfall
PROGRESS Chapter Seven (19 May 2013)
Eddie Dennis	Pinfall (Note: This was a four-way elimination match. Order of elimination: Xander Cooper, Joey Lakeside, Darrell Allen)
Darrell Allen Joey Lakeside Xander Cooper	13:36 — —

Semifinals
PROGRESS Chapter Eight (28 July 2013)
Mark Andrews	Pinfall
Jonathan Windsor	10:00
PROGRESS Chapter Nine (29 September 2013)
Paul Robinson	Pinfall
Eddie Dennis	10:35

Final
PROGRESS Chapter Ten (24 November 2013)
Mark Andrews	Pinfall
Paul Robinson	13:28

=== Natural Progression Series II ===
The second edition of the tournament took place from 26 January 2014 to 25 January 2015 across various Progress Wrestling events. The winner of the tournament was Morgan Webster.

Tournament bracket

1st Round
PROGRESS Chapter 14 (27 July 2014)
Chuck Mambo Pastor William Eaver	9:00 —
Ali Armstrong	Pinfall
PROGRESS Chapter Twelve (30 March 2014)
Zack Gibson	Pinfall
Will Ospreay	12:10
PROGRESS Chapter 13 (18 May 2014)
Pete Dunne	Pinfall
Robbie X	10:51
PROGRESS Chapter Eleven (26 January 2014)
Josh Bodom	10:34
Morgan Webster	Pinfall

Semifinals
PROGRESS Chapter 16 (30 November 2014)
Ali Armstrong	12:53
Zack Gibson	Pinfall
PROGRESS Chapter 15 (28 September 2014)
Pete Dunne	7:42
Morgan Webster	Pinfall

Final
PROGRESS Chapter 17 (25 January 2015)
Zack Gibson	15:57
Morgan Webster	Pinfall

=== Natural Progression Series III ===
The third edition of the tournament took place from 26 July 2015 to 24 April 2016 across various Progress Wrestling events. The winner of the tournament was William Eaver.

Tournament bracket

1st Round
PROGRESS Chapter 22 (18 October 2015)
Pastor William Eaver	Pinfall
Tyler Bate	8:57
PROGRESS Chapter 20 (26 July 2015)
Damian Dunne	8:58
Sebastian	Pinfall
PROGRESS Chapter 24 (6 December 2015)
Ashton Smith	Pinfall
Kyle Ashmore	9:30
PROGRESS Chapter 23 (29 November 2015)
Damon Moser	Pinfall
Jack Sexsmith Shen Woo	6:54 —

Semifinals
PROGRESS Chapter 27 (27 March 2016)
William Eaver	Pinfall
Damian Dunne (Note: Sebastian had to withdraw from the tournament due to injury. Damian Dunne replaced Sebastian in the semifinals.)	10:34
PROGRESS Chapter 28 (10 April 2016)
Ashton Smith	10:10
Damon Moser	Pinfall

Final
PROGRESS Chapter 29 (24 April 2016)
William Eaver	Pinfall
Damon Moser	11:10

=== Natural Progression Series IV ===
This tournament was held to crown the inaugural PROGRESS Women's Champion. This was the only edition of the tournament to feature female participants. Toni Storm was the winner.

Tournament bracket

Qualifier
Freedom's Road (15 November 2016)
Chakara	Pinfall
Pollyanna	9:26

1st Round
Chapter 38 (30 October 2016)
Jinny	Pinfall
Pollyanna	16:25
Chapter 39 (27 November 2016)
Katey Harvey	—
Nixon Newell	Pinfall
Chapter 40 (11 December 2016)
Bea Priestley	9:54
Toni Storm	Pinfall
Chapter 44 (26 February 2017)
Dahlia Black	Pinfall
Martina	9:32
Chapter 42 (15 January 2017)
Alex Windsor	Submission
Livvii Grace	13:43
Chapter 43 (29 January 2017)
Laura Di Matteo	Submission
Chakara	—

Semifinals
Chapter 45 (19 March 2017)
Jinny	Pinfall
Nixon Newell	7:39
Chapter 46 (26 March 2017)
Toni Storm	Pinfall
Dahlia Black	6:52
Chapter 47 (23 April 2017)
Alex Windsor	—
Laura Di Matteo	Submission

Final
Chapter 49 – Night 2 (28 May 2017)
Jinny	—
Toni Storm	Pinfall
Laura Di Matteo	—

=== Natural Progression Series V ===
The fifth edition of the tournament took place from 28 January to 24 June 2018 across various Progress Wrestling events. The winner of the tournament was Mark Davis.

Tournament bracket

Qualifiers
Live At The Dome (10 January 2018)
Connor Mills	—
Maverick Mayhew	Pinfall
Live At The Dome (10 January 2018)
Kyle Fletcher	—
Mark Davis	Pinfall

1st Round
PROGRESS Chapter 62 (28 January 2018)
Chris Ridgeway	Pinfall
Omari	10:00
PROGRESS Chapter 63 (11 February 2018)
Spike Trivet	5:42
Drew Parker	Pinfall
PROGRESS Chapter 65 (25 March 2018)
Danny Duggan	Pinfall
Danny Jones	13:26
PROGRESS Chapter 64 (25 February 2018)
Maverick Mayhew	—
Mark Davis	Pinfall

Semifinals
PROGRESS Chapter 70 (27 May 2018)
Chris Ridgeway	Pinfall
Drew Parker	11:39
PROGRESS Chapter 71 (10 June 2018)
Danny Duggan	9:03
Mark Davis	Pinfall

Final
PROGRESS Chapter 72 (24 June 2018)
Chris Ridgeway	17:50
Mark Davis	Pinfall

=== Natural Progression Series VI ===
The sixth edition of the tournament was the first and only edition held in one event, the Natural Progression Series 6 event, on 14 September 2019 at the Electric Ballroom in London, England. The winner of the tournament was Scotty Davis.

Tournament bracket

1st Round; Natural Progression Series 6; 14 September 2019
Scotty Davis	Pinfall
Gene Munny	10:32
Dan Moloney	10:47
Cara Noir	Pinfall
The OJMO	Pinfall
Veit Müller	13:29
Malik	12:04
Danny Duggan	Pinfall

Semifinals; Natural Progression Series 6; 14 September 2019
Scotty Davis	Pinfall
Cara Noir	—
The OJMO	12:18
Danny Duggan	Pinfall

Final; Natural Progression Series 6; 14 September 2019
Scotty Davis	Pinfall
Danny Duggan	13:49

=== Natural Progression Series VII ===
The seventh edition of the tournament took place in February 2021 at Theatre Peckham in London, England. The first round took place at Chapter 104: Natural Progression on 20 February, while the semifinals and final took place at Chapter 105: Bring the Thunder on 27 February. The winner of the tournament was Luke Jacobs.

Tournament bracket

1st Round; Chapter 104: Natural Progression; 20 February 2021
Warren Banks	Pinfall
Big Guns Joe	7:24
ELIJAH	10:59
Danny Black	Pinfall
Ethan Allen	Referee's decision
Kid Lykos II	12:12
Man Like DeReiss	9:39
Luke Jacobs	Pinfall

Semifinals; Chapter 105: Bring the Thunder; 27 February 2021
Warren Banks	Referee's decision
Danny Black	10:49
Ethan Allen	12:48
Luke Jacobs	Referee's decision

Final; Chapter 105: Bring the Thunder; 27 February 2021
Warren Banks	10:14
Luke Jacobs	Pinfall

=== Natural Progression Series 8 ===
The eighth edition of the tournament took place from 27 September to 27 November 2022 across various Progress Wrestling events. The winner of the tournament was Ricky Knight Jr..

Tournament bracket

Qualifiers
Chapter 142 (25 September 2022)
Alexander Roth Hari Singh Tom Thelwell	— — 6:18
Peter Tihanyi	Pinfall
Chapter 138 (14 August 2022)
Liam Slater	Pinfall
Screwface Ahmed Shreddy	7:12 —

1st Round
Return of the Fly (27 September 2022)
Peter Tihanyi	Pinfall
Ricky Knight Jr.	11:40
Chapter 143 (9 October 2022)
Leon Slater	Pinfall
Liam Slater	11:35
Chapter 143 (9 October 2022)
Sam Bailey	10:55
Tate Mayfairs	Pinfall
Chapter 144 (16 October 2022)
Joe Lando	8:35
Nico Angelo	Pinfall

Semifinals
Chapter 145 (23 October 2022)
Ricky Knight Jr.	Pinfall
Leon Slater	12:08
Chapter 145 (23 October 2022)
Tate Mayfairs	Pinfall
Nico Angelo	9:29

Final
Chapter 146 (27 November 2022)
Ricky Knight Jr.	Pinfall
Tate Mayfairs	15:11
