= Man Like DeReiss =

English professional wrestler (born 1997)

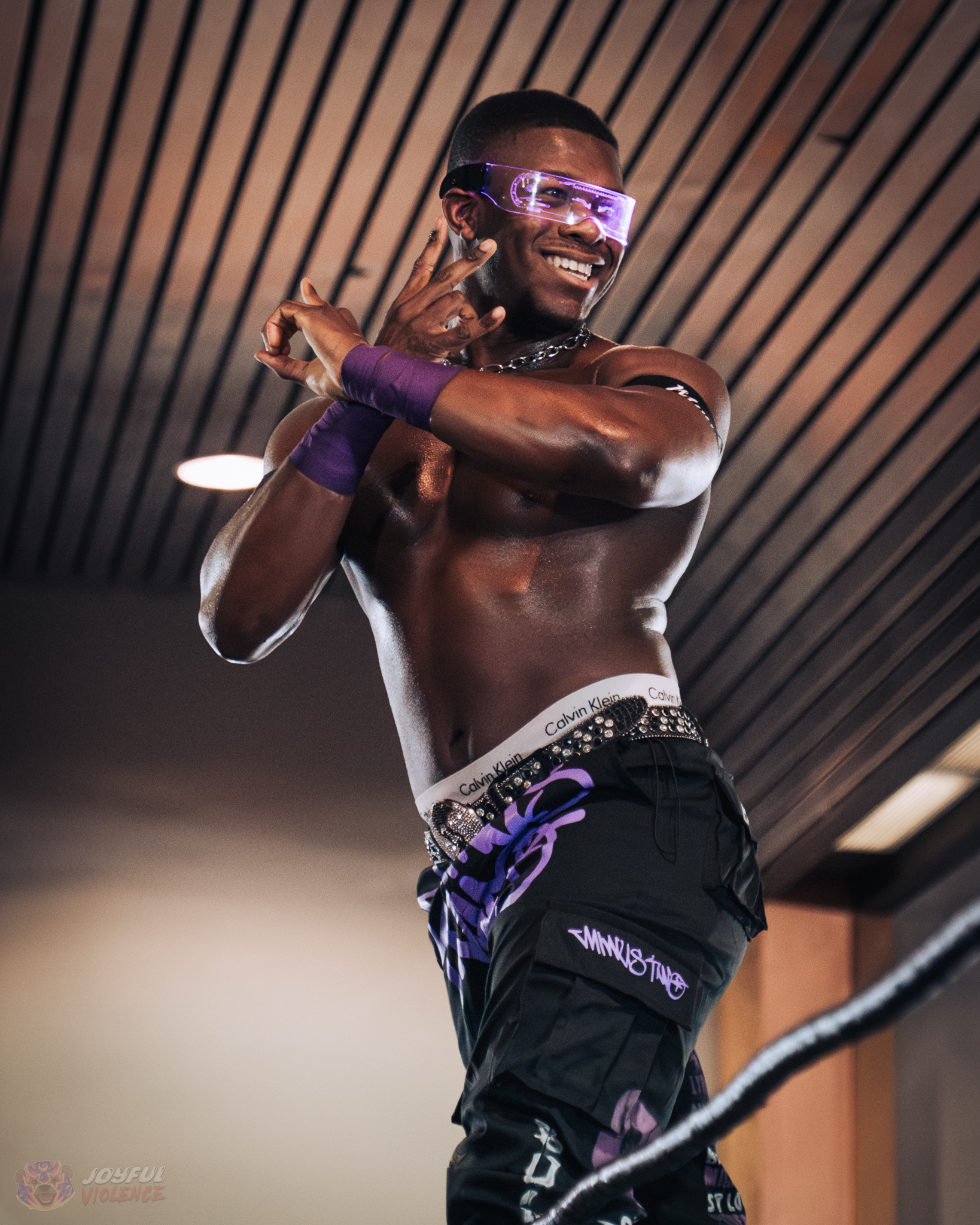
- DeReiss in April 2024

Personal information
- Born: 5 January 1997 (age 29) Birmingham, England

Professional wrestling career
- Ring name: DeReiss Dereiss Gordon Man Like DeReiss Man Like Mysterio
- Billed weight: 91 kg (201 lb)
- Trained by: Marty Jones; Marshall X
- Debut: 2018

DeReiss Gordon (born 5 January 1997), better known by his ring name Man Like DeReiss, is an English professional wrestler. He currently performs on the independent circuit.

== Professional wrestling career ==
=== British independent circuit (2018–present) ===
Gordon shared brief or longer tenures with various promotions from the British independent scene such as Attack! Pro Wrestling, One Pro Wrestling, and many others. At RevPro Summer Sizzler 2022, an event promoted by Revolution Pro Wrestling, Gordon competed in an AEW All-Atlantic Championship six-way scramble number one contendership won by Connor Mills and also involving Callum Newman, Ricky Knight Jr., Robbie X and Will Kroos.

=== Progress Wrestling (2021–present) ===
Gordon made his debut in Progress Wrestling at Progress Chapter 104: Natural Progression in the 2021 edition of the namesake tournament of Natural Progression Series, where he fell short to Luke Jacobs in the first rounds.

During his time with the promotion, Gordon chased for various championships promoted by it. At Progress Chapter 125: Castle Of Illusion on 13 November 2021, he unsuccessfully took part into a six-way scramble for the number one contendership at the Progress World Championship won by Gene Munny and also involving Big Guns Joe, Ethan Allen, Kid Lykos II and LK Mezinger. He found himself in another match of this kind at Progress Chapter 127: And The Word Was Progress... on 23 January 2022, where he fell short to the winner Warren Banks and Dan Moloney, Jody Fleisch, Malik and Roy Johnson. At Progress Chapter 131: 10th Anniversary Show on 25 March 2022, Gordon teamed up with his "The 0121" tag team partner Dan Moloney and defeated reigning champions Smokin' Aces (Charlie Sterling and Nick Riley) in a five-way tag team match also involving Lykos Gym (Kid Lykos and Kid Lykos II), Sunshine Machine (Chuck Mambo and TK Cooper), and North West Strong (Chris Ridgeway and Luke Jacobs). At Progress Chapter 137: The Deadly Viper Tour on 13 August 2022, Gordon competed in a three-way match for the Progress Wrestling Atlas Championship won by retaining champion Luke Jacobs and Mark Davis. Gordon competed for the first time directly for the Progress World Championship at Progress Chapter 142: The Deadly Viper Tour on 25 September 2022, where he fell short to Spike Trivet. He also came out unsuccessfully from the same type of match which occurred at Chapter 166: Freedom Walks Again on 5 April 2024, where he unsuccessfully challenged Kid Lykos.

Gordon unsuccessfully competed for Westside Xtreme Wrestling's wXw Shotgun Championship at Progress Chapter 145 on 23 October 2022, where he fell short to Maggot.

As for the Super Strong Style 16, the biggest annual tournament promoted by Progress, Gordon made his first appearance at the 2023 edition where he fell short to Shigehiro Irie in the first rounds. At the 2024 edition, he defeated Aigle Blanc in the first rounds, Shelton Benjamin in the second rounds, but fell short to Ricky Knight Jr. in the semifinals.

=== WWE (2019–2020) ===
Gordon briefly competed for WWE's NXT UK brand under his real name. He made his first appearance at WWE NXT UK #70 on 21 November 2019, where he fell short to Eddie Dennis. He made his last appearance at WWE NXT UK #83 on 20 February 2020, he teamed up with Dan Moloney in a losing effort against Pretty Deadly (Lewis Howley and Sam Stoker).

=== Game Changer Wrestling (2022–present) ===
Gordon competed in Game Changer Wrestling (GCW) events as TNT developmental talent. He made his first appearance in a co-promoted event at TNT Supreme Extreme 2022 on 15 September 2022, where he unsuccessfully challenged Matt Cardona for the latter's unsanctioned Internet Championship. Two nights later at TNT Vs. GCW 2022 on 17 September 2022, where he defeated Tony Deppen. At TNT Vs. GCW 2023 on 17 September Gordon unsuccessfully challenged Blake Christian for the GCW World Championship. Gordon participated at the 2024 edition of the Joey Janela's Spring Break where he competed in an 80-person Clusterfuck Battle Royal won by Microman and also involving various other notable opponents such as Justin Credible, Tommy Dreamer, Tony DeVito, Shane Douglas, SeXXXy Eddy and many others.

== Championships and accomplishments ==
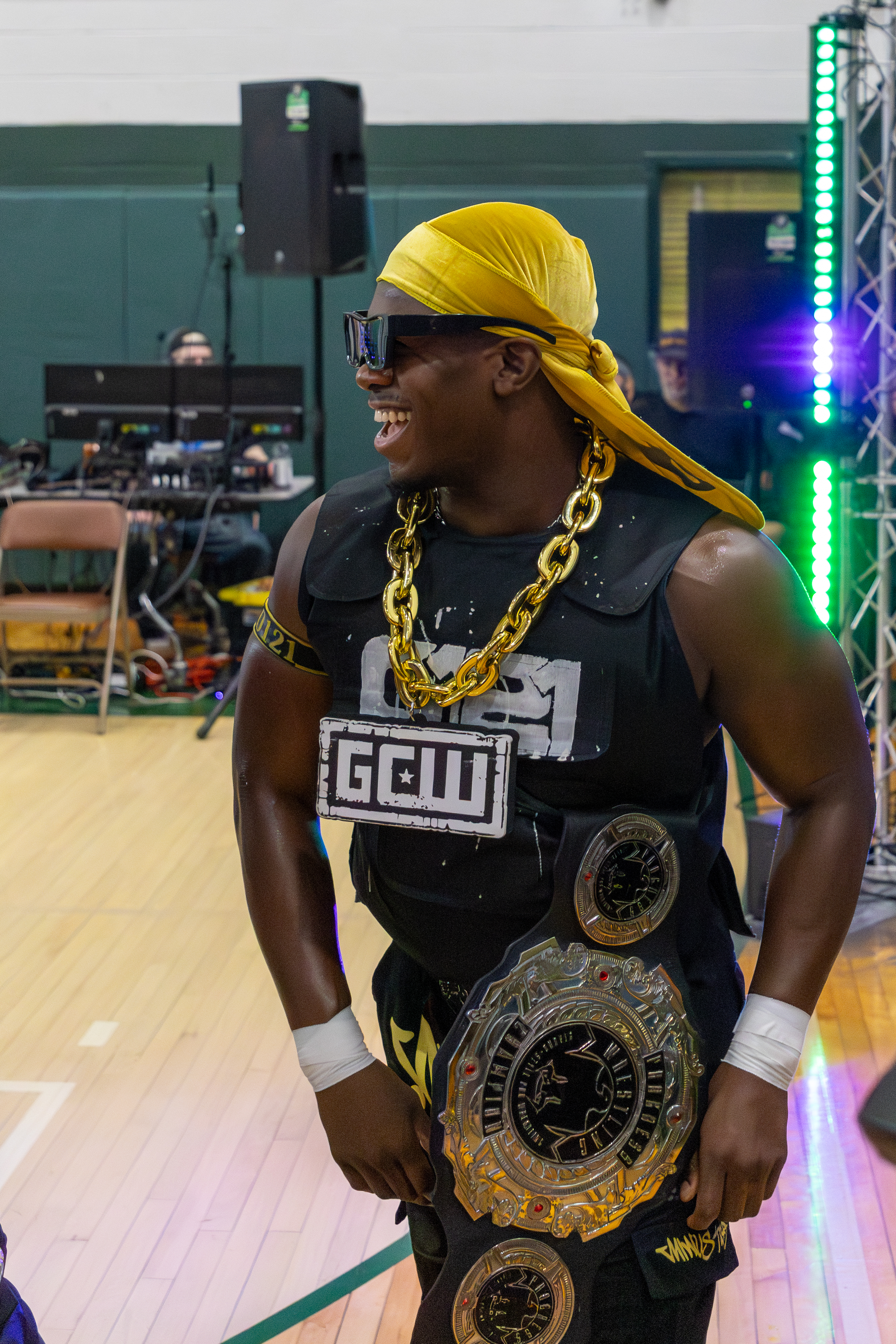
In Progress Wrestling, DeReiss is a one-time PROGRESS World Champion.

- Attack! Pro Wrestling
  - Attack! 24:7 Championship (2 times)
  - Attack! Tag Team Championship (2 times) – with Dan Moloney
- British Wrestling Revolution
  - BWR Underground Championship (1 time)
- Evolution Wrestling
  - Evolution Middleweight Championship (1 time, final)
- Fight Club: PRO
  - FCP Tag Team Championship (1 time, final) – with Dan Moloney
- Immortal Wrestling
  - IW National Heavyweight Championship (1 time)
- Kamikaze Pro
  - Kamikaze Pro Championship (1 time, current)
- North Wrestling
  - North Tag Team Championship (1 time, inaugural) – with Leon Slater
- One Pro Wrestling
  - 1PW Tag Team Championship (1 time, final) – with Leon Slater
- Progress Wrestling
  - PROGRESS World Championship (1 time)
  - Progress Tag Team Championship (2 times) – with Dan Moloney
  - Super Strong Style 16 (2025)
- Pro Wrestling Illustrated
  - Ranked No. 60 of the top 500 singles wrestlers in the PWI 500 in 2026
  - Ranked No. 89 of the top 100 tag teams in the PWI Tag Team 100 of 2023 – with Leon Slater
- Squash A Jobber Wrestling
  - ASCA Tag Team Championship (1 time) – with Leon Slater
- TNT Extreme Wrestling
  - TNT Ultra X Championship (1 time)
- Wrestle Carnival
  - King Of The Carnival Championship (1 time)
  - Foley Invitational (2025)
- Wrestling Resurgence
  - Resurgence Championship (1 time)
  - Resurgence Arthouse Championship (1 time)
- Slammasters Wrestling
  - SMW Championship (2 times, current)
- Tidal Championship Wrestling
  - TCW Open Championship (1 time)

Ranking in PWI 500
Year	2020	2021	2022	2023	2024	2025	2026
Rank	388	–	▼410	▲238	▲226	▲117	▲60
