= Allie Katch =

American professional wrestler (born 1994)

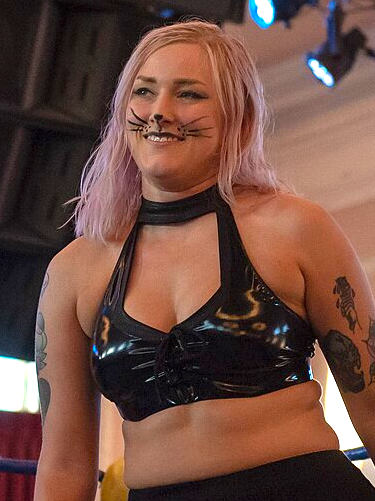
- Katch as Stray Kat in May 2019

Personal information
- Born: Alison Woodard; February 16, 1994 (age 32) Texas, U.S.

Professional wrestling career
- Ring names: Allie Kat; Allie Katch; Stray Kat
- Billed height: 5 ft 6 in (168 cm)
- Billed weight: 185 lb (84 kg)
- Trained by: George de la Isla
- Debut: July 2015

Alison Woodard (born February 16, 1994), known under the ring name Allie Katch, is an American professional wrestler. She primarily works with Game Changer Wrestling (GCW), and also competes on the independent circuit.

== Professional wrestling career ==
Woodard made her in-ring debut on July 25, 2015, for the now defunct Austin-based wrestling promotion, Total Championship Wrestling, under the ring name Allie Kat in an intergender tag team match which saw her team with Comrade Silovic in a losing effort against Donnie Giovanni and Laynie Luck.

=== Game Changer Wrestling (2017–present) ===
On December 30, 2017, at The Compound Fight Club: Chapter 1, Kat made her debut for Game Changer Wrestling (GCW), losing to Faye Jackson. She returned on April 6, 2019, at Orange Cassidy Is Doing Something Or Whatever, winning the Lumberjack Swamp Monster Elimination match. On October 10, 2020, Kat competed in a 30-person battle royal at Joey Janela's Spring Break 4.

On April 9, 2022, at GCW Paranoid, Kat, now using the ring name Allie Katch, won the GCW Tag Team Championship with Effy. On July 29, at The People vs. GCW, Katch and Effy lost the titles to Los Mazicos (Ciclope and Miedo Extremo) in a five-way WarGames match.

On January 19, 2025, in an intergender match against Effy for the GCW World Title number one contendership, Katch broke her leg in two places after she landed awkwardly following a suicide dive through the bottom and middle ropes to the outside of the ring. She underwent reconstructive surgery the following day, later stating on X that she will be unable to wrestle indefinitely.

=== Other appearances ===
==== All Elite Wrestling ====
Katch appeared on the September 21, 2021 episode of AEW Dark, losing to Big Swole.

==== Progress Wrestling ====
Katch made her Progress Wrestling debut at Chapter 141, on September 19, 2022, where she teamed up with Kanji and lost to Lana Austin and Skye Smitson with interference from L.A Taylor Her next appearance on February 12, 2023, at Chapter 149, where she faced Session Moth Martina in a winning effort after interference from L.A Taylor On June 25, at DEFY x PROGRESS, Katch competed in a four-way match for the DEFY Women's Championship and lost.

== Championships and accomplishments ==
- Capital City Championship Combat
  - Terry Ann Gibson Memorial Tag Team Tournament (2019) – with Jody Threat
- Game Changer Wrestling
  - GCW Tag Team Championship (1 time) - with Effy
- Glory Pro Wrestling
  - Glory Pro Women's World Crown Championship (1 time)
  - Women's World Crown Tournament (2026)
- Hoodslam
  - Best Athlete in the East Bay Championship (2 times, current)
- Pro Wrestling Illustrated
  - Ranked No. 51 of the top 150 female wrestlers in the PWI Women's 150 in 2022
  - Ranked No. 96 of the top 500 singles wrestlers in the PWI 500 in 2025
- Pro Wrestling Magic
  - PWM Women's Championship (1 time)
- River City Wrestling
  - RCW Women's Championship (1 time)
- House Of Heat Wrestling
- HOH Women's World Champion (1 time, current)
- Wrestling With Wregret
  - WWW YouTube Championship (1 time)
