= Leon Slater =

English professional wrestler (born 2004)

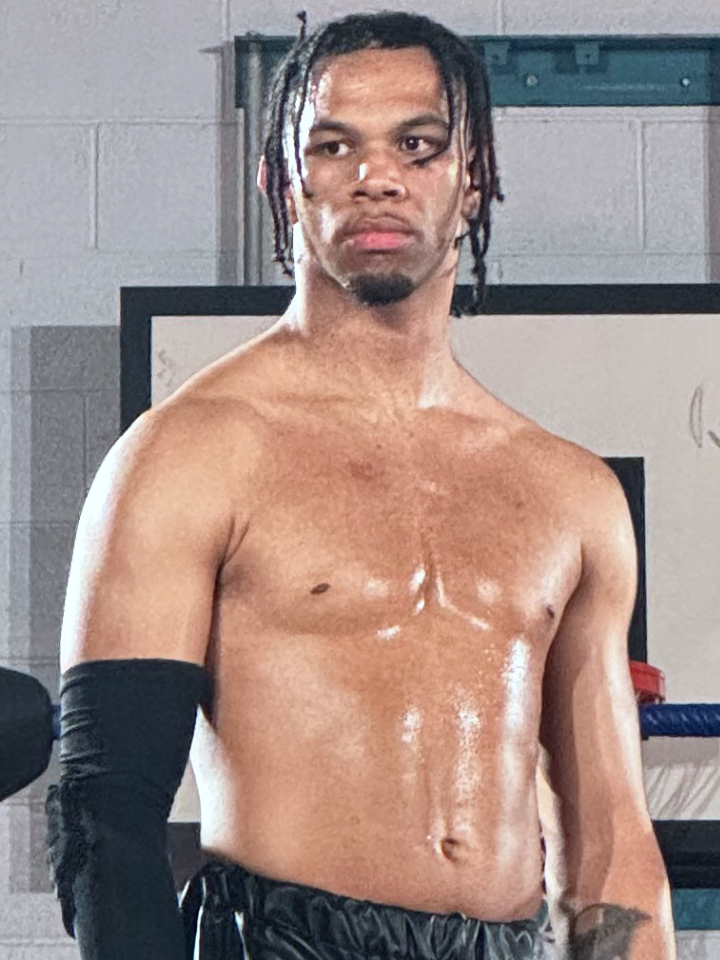
- Slater in 2024

Personal information
- Born: 27 September 2004 (age 22) Bradford, West Yorkshire, England

Professional wrestling career
- Ring name(s): Leon Blade; Leon Slater
- Billed height: 6 ft 1 in (1.85 m)
- Billed weight: 196 lb (89 kg)
- Billed from: Bradford, West Yorkshire, England
- Trained by: Liam Slater
- Debut: 5 May 2019

Leon Slater (born 27 September 2004) is an English professional wrestler. He is signed to Total Nonstop Action Wrestling (TNA), where he is the current TNA World Champion in his first reign. He is also a former two-time TNA X Division Champion, tied for records as the longest and shortest reigning champion. Slater also holds the record of being the youngest champion to have held the two titles.

Slater also makes appearances for Revolution Pro Wrestling (RevPro). He previously wrestled for the United States In Game Changer Wrestling (GCW) and England In Progress Wrestling.

== Professional wrestling career ==
=== Early career (2019–2022) ===
Slater made his professional wrestling debut on May 5, 2019 as Leon Blade. He changed his name to Leon Slater soon after and worked for various promotions of the British independent scene.

=== Revolution Pro Wrestling (2022–present) ===
Slater made his debut in Revolution Pro Wrestling at RevPro Live In London 64 on August 7, 2022, where he unsuccessfully challenged Luke Jacobs for the Undisputed British Cruiserweight Championship. He continued to make regular appearances in the company's signature events such as the British J-Cup, where he made his first appearance at the 2022 edition where he defeated Lio Rush in the first rounds but fell short to Robbie X, Lee Hunter and Will Kaven in a four-way match in the finals which occurred on the same night. One year later, Slater succeeded in winning the cup by defeating Will Kaven in the first rounds and then Harrison Bennett, Máscara Dorada and Wild Boar in the four-way match of the finals. At RevPro Revolution Rumble 2023 on March 26, Slater competed in the traditional royal rumble match, bout won by Michael Oku and also involving various other notable opponents such as Big Damo, Callum Newman, Eddie Dennis, Gabriel Kidd, Francesco Akira, Rampage Brown, Sha Samuels, Trent Seven, Zack Sabre Jr. and many others. At RevPro 11th Anniversary Show on August 26, 2023, Slater defeated Dan Moloney in singles competition. At RevPro Uprising 2023 on December 16, Slater defeated Connor Mills to win the Undisputed British Cruiserweight Championship.

Slater competed at Royal Quest III, a cross-over event promoted by RevPro in partnership with New Japan Pro Wrestling on October 14, 2023, where he teamed up with Cameron Khai to unsuccessfully challenge Bullet Club War Dogs (Drilla Moloney and Clark Connors) for the IWGP Junior Heavyweight Tag Team Championship.

=== Game Changer Wrestling (2022–2025) ===
Slater has shared a stint tenure with American promotion Game Changer Wrestling since 2022. He made his first appearance at GCW In Liverpool 2022 on September 16, where he unsuccessfully challenged Cole Radrick, Joe Lando and Tony Deppen for the GCW Extreme Championship. At GCW 56 Nights 2023 on January 1, Slater competed twice. First in a 30-person rumble won by Masha Slamovich and also involving various other notable opponents, both male and female such as Billie Starkz, Allie Katch, Effy, John Wayne Murdoch, Jordan Oliver, Mance Warner and many others. On the same night, he fell short to Nick Wayne. At GCW In Liverpool 2023 on September 16, Slater unsuccessfully challenged Blake Christian for the GCW World Championship.

=== Progress Wrestling (2022–present) ===
Slater made his debut in Progress Wrestling at Progress Chapter 134: No Mountain High Enough on May 15, 2022, where he fell short to Ricky Knight Jr. At Progress Chapter 136: 24/7 on July 24, 2022, he teamed up with Ricky Knight Jr. to unsuccessfully challenge Sunshine Machine (Chuck Mambo and TK Cooper) for the Progress Tag Team Championship. Slater competed in one of the promotion's top tournaments, the Natural Progression Series, in which he made his first appearance at the 2023 edition where he defeated Liam Slater in the first rounds but fell short to Ricky Knight Jr. in the semifinals. As for the Super Strong Style 16, Slater made his first appearance at the 2023 edition where he fell short to Mark Haskins in the first rounds.

=== Impact Wrestling / Total Nonstop Action Wrestling (2023–present) ===
==== Early beginnings (2023–2025) ====
In October 2023, Slater signed a contract with Impact Wrestling (later rebranded to Total Nonstop Action Wrestling). He made his debut in the promotion at Turning Point on October 27, 2023, where he defeated Mark Haskins to retain the North Wrestling Championship. On the third night of the Impact Wrestling UK Invasion Tour from October 29, 2023, he fell short to Trey Miguel in singles competition.

On the October 10, 2024 episode of Impact!, Slater defeated Jason Hotch and Laredo Kid to become the number one contender for the TNA X Division Championship, but failed to win the title from "Speedball" Mike Bailey the following week. On May 23, 2025 at Under Siege, Slater teamed with Matt Hardy as an injury replacement for Jeff Hardy in an unsuccessful challenge of Nic Nemeth and Ryan Nemeth for the TNA World Tag Team Championship.

==== X Division Champion (2025–2026) ====
On July 20 at Slammiversary, Slater defeated Moose to win the TNA X Division Championship and became the youngest champion. After the match, he was congratulated by a returning AJ Styles. On August 15 at Emergence, Slater defeated Cedric Alexander in his first title defence. At Victory Road on September 26, Slater retained the X Division Championship against Myron Reed. At Bound for Glory on October 12, 2025, Slater defended the title against NXT's Je'Von Evans in a match that first went to a 20-minute time limit draw, then was restarted by Director of Authority Santino Marella and subsequently ended in a no contest following interference from DarkState. At Turning Point on November 14, Slater retained the X Division Championship against Rich Swann. At Final Resolution on December 5, Slater retained the X Division Championship against A. J. Francis.

At Thursday Night Impact! premiere on AMC on 15 January 2026, Slater was originally scheduled to defend the TNA X Division Championship against Myron Reed. However, the match was shelved after Slater could not appear due to a visa issue.on the March 5 episode of Impact!, Slater retained the X Division Championship against Nic Nemeth. He fell short on his path to becoming the longest-reigning TNA X Division Champion when he lost against Alexander 2–1 in a 2-out-of-3 Falls match on the May 14 episode of Thursday Night Impact!, ending his reign at a record-tying 298 days.

==== TNA World Champion (2026–present) ====
On August 23 at Lockdown, Slater defeated Alexander in a Last Man Standing Steel Cage match to win back the TNA X Division Championship, where if Slater had lost, his initial reign would have been unrecognized. He vacated the title later that night after invoking Option C for a TNA World Championship match at Bound for Glory. At the event on October 11, Slater defeated Nemeth to win the TNA World Championship, becoming the youngest holder in the title's history and marking the first major world championship of his career. This also marked the first time a wrestler born in the 21st century to win a world championship in TNA.

At Destination X, Slater defeated Trey Miguel to retain the title. On the November 19 episode of Impact!, Slater defeated Nic Nemeth to retain the title.

=== WWE (2025–2026) ===
Through TNA's working relationship with WWE, Slater made several appearances on the promotion's developmental brand NXT. Slater competed in his first WWE main roster match with Je'Von Evans, losing against then-World Tag Team Champions AJ Styles and Dragon Lee at Saturday Night's Main Event XLII, after that, Slater earned an NXT Championship match by winning a number one contender's fatal-four way match on the December 16, 2025 episode of NXT, but failed to defeat the champion Oba Femi at NXT: New Year's Evil on January 6, 2026. On the 16 January episode of SmackDown, he answered WWE United States Champion Carmelo Hayes' open challenge, but failed to win the title.

== Championships and accomplishments ==
- Adratic Special Combat Academy
  - ASCA Tag Team Championship (1 time) - with Man Like DeReiss
- Discovery Wrestling
  - Y Division Championship (1 time)
- NORTH Wrestling
  - NORTH Championship (1 time)
  - NORTH Tag Team Championship (1 time) - with Man Like DeReiss
- One Pro Wrestling
  - 1PW Tag Team Championship (1 time) – with Man Like DeReiss
- Pro Wrestling Illustrated
  - Ranked No. 29 of the top 500 singles wrestlers in the PWI 500 in 2026
- Revolution Pro Wrestling
  - Undisputed British Cruiserweight Championship (1 time)
  - British J-Cup (2023)
  - Undisputed British Tag Team Championship (1 time) – with Liam Slater
- Sovereign Pro Wrestling
  - SOVPRO Commonwealth Championship (1 time)
- Total Nonstop Action Wrestling
  - TNA X Division Championship (2 times)
  - TNA World Championship (1 time, current)
  - TNA Year End Awards (3 times)
    - One to Watch in 2025
    - X-Division Star of the Year (2025)
    - Finishing Move of the Year (2025)
- TNT Extreme Wrestling
  - TNT World Championship (1 time)
