= Luke Jacobs =

English professional wrestler

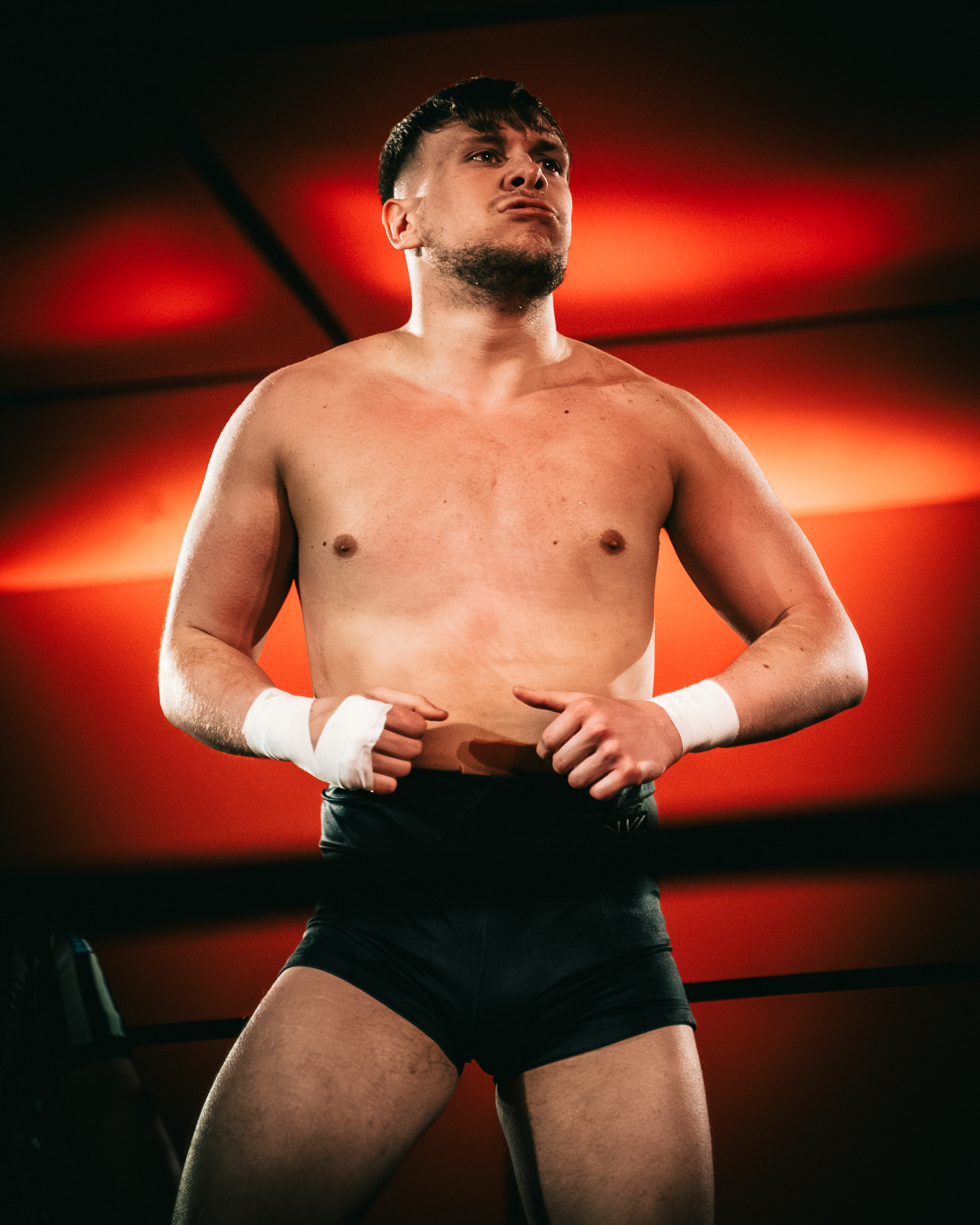
- Jacobs in April 2025

Personal information
- Born: 21 August 2000 (age 26) Manchester, England
- Education: Middleton Technology School; Hopwood Hall College

Professional wrestling career
- Ring name: Luke Jacobs
- Billed height: 6 ft 0 in (183 cm)
- Billed weight: 165 lb (75 kg)
- Trained by: James Drake; Zack Gibson
- Debut: 2018

Luke Jacobs (born 21 August 2000) is an English professional wrestler, He currently works for the British promotions Revolution Pro Wrestling (RevPro) and Progress Wrestling. In RevPro, he is a former one-time Undisputed British Heavyweight Champion, and a former one-time Undisputed British Cruiserweight Champion; and in Progress, a former one-time Progress Atlas Champion and the former one-time PROGRESS World Champion.

== Early life ==
Jacobs was born on 21 August 2000 in Manchester England. He attended the Middleton Technology School and later Hopwood Hall College. At age 15, Jacobs began training at the FutureShock Wrestling Performance Centre under the instructions of James Drake and Zack Gibson.

== Professional wrestling career ==
=== British independent scene (2018–present) ===
Jacobs is known for competing in various of the British independent scene. At Royal Quest II, an event promoted by New Japan Pro Wrestling on British territory on 2 October 2022, Jacobs teamed up with Ethan Allen in a losing effort against Los Ingobernables de Japon (Sanada and Hiromu Takahashi).

=== Future Shock Wrestling (2018–2021) ===
Jacobs made his professional wrestling debut in Future Shock Wrestling at FutureShock UnderGround #27 on 16 June 2018, when he teamed up with Ethan Allen and Ashton Smith to defeat Cyanide and WonderLand (Henry T. Grodd and Noah) in a six-man tag team match.

=== Progress Wrestling (2019–present) ===
Jacobs made his debut in Progress Wrestling at PROGRESS Chapter 92: Entertaining Friends on 7 July 2019, when he fell short to Soner Dursun in a dark match. He continued to make appearances for the company, marking his very next arrival at PROGRESS Chapter 96: True Friends Stab You In The Front on 13 October 2019, when he teamed up with his long-time "The Young Guns" tag team partner Ethan Allen in a losing effort against Pretty Deadly (Lewis Howley and Sam Stoker). Jacobs was signed by the company at the beginning of 2021, and soon after, he began chasing for various championships promoted by it. At PROGRESS Chapter 106: Stick A Pony In Me Pocket on 13 March 2021, he unsuccessfully challenged Cara Noir for the PROGRESS World Championship. Jacobs and Ethan Allen competed in a tournament for the vacant PROGRESS Tag Team Championship in which they defeated Chris Ridgeway and Danny Black in the first rounds from PROGRESS Chapter 108: Of Course You Realize This Means War on 10 April 2021, Sunshine Machine (TK Cooper and Chuck Mambo at PROGRESS Chapter 110: Skeleton Head from 8 May 2021, in the semifinals, but fell short to Lykos Gym (Kid Lykos and Kid Lykos II) at PROGRESS Chapter 112: The Flowers Are Still Standing on 5 June 2021, in the finals. At PROGRESS Chapter 131: 10th Anniversary Show on 25 March 2022, Jacobs teamed up with Chris Ridgeway as "North West Strong" to unsuccessfully challenge for the tag titles again in a gauntlet tag team match won by The 0121 (Dan Moloney and Man Like DeReiss), and also involving reigning champions The Smokin' Aces (Charlie Sterling & Nick Riley), Lykos Gym (Kid Lykos and Kid Lykos II), and The Sunshine Machine (Chuck Mambo and TK Cooper). Jacobs competed in a tournament for the vacant Progress Wrestling Atlas Championship which began at PROGRESS Chapter 132: By The Beard Of Zeus on 17 April 2022, when he defeated Big Damo in the first rounds. In the semifinals from PROGRESS Chapter 133 Stop Motion Skeleton Battle from 18 April, Jacobs defeated Warren Banks. The finals took place the same night as he defeated Jonah to win the vacant title.

He competed in various of the promotion's signature events. The first of them was the Natural Progression Series, making his first appearance at the seventh edition which he won by defeating Man Like DeReiss in the first rounds, Ethan Allen in the second ones and Warren Banks in the finals which took place at PROGRESS Chapter 105: Bring The Thunder on 27 February 2021. Another tournament he took part of was the Super Strong Style 16, making his first appearance at the 2023 edition where he defeated Rampage Brown in the first rounds, Shigehiro Irie in the second ones, but fell short to Mark Haskins in the semifinals.

=== Revolution Pro Wrestling (2021–present) ===
Jacobs made his debut in Revolution Pro Wrestling at RevPro Live In Bristol 3 on 18 July 2021, when he teamed up with Ethan Allen and fell short to The Dream Team (Dean Allmark and Robbie X) in one of the 2021 edition of the "Great British Tag League" block A matches. Jacobs and Allen continued their evolution in the tournament by falling short to Destination Everywhere (Connor Mills and Michael Oku) at RevPro Live At The Cockpit 52 on 1 August, and defeated Lykos Gym (Kid Lykos and Kid Lykos II) at RevPro Pop-Up Show on 15 August 2021, finishing the tournament with a total of three points. At RevPro Live At NOT The Cockpit 53 on Jacobs teamed up with Allen to unsuccessfully challenge Destination Everywhere (Connor Mills and Michael Oku) for the British Tag Team Championship. At the 2021 edition of the RevPro British J Cup, Jacobs defeated Robbie X in the first rounds, and then unsuccessfully competed in a four-way match in the finals won by Mike Bailey and also involving Connor Mills and Michael Oku. At RevPro Summer Sizzler 2022 on 23 July, Jacobs defeated Michael Oku to win the Undisputed British Cruiserweight Championship . At RevPro Revolution Rumble 2023, Jacobs competed in the traditional rumble match won by Michael Oku and also involving notable opponents such as Francesco Akira, Eddie Dennis, Gabriel Kidd, Ricky Knight Jr., Zack Sabre Jr., Trent Seven, Leon Slater, Gideon Grey and many others.

=== Westside Xtreme Wrestling (2020–present) ===
Jacobs often competes for the German promotion Westside Xtreme Wrestling. He made his first appearance on the second night of the 2020 edition of the 16 Carat Gold Tournament, where he teamed up with Ethan Allen to defeat Avalanche and Black Taurus, Chris Ridgeway and Scotty Davis, D.J. Hyde and Levaniel, Julian Pace and Puma King, Leon van Gasteren and Lucky Kid, and Norman Harras and Tarik in a gauntlet tag team match. One night later at wXw We Love Wrestling #1, Jacobs and Allen unsuccessfully challenged Jay-AA (Absolute Andy and Jay Skillet) for the wXw World Tag Team Championship. After three years of absence, Jacobs returned at wXw We Love Wrestling #46 on 27 May 2023, when he unsuccessfully challenged Shigehiro Irie for the WXw Unified World Wrestling Championship.

== Championships and accomplishments ==
- Future Shock Wrestling
  - FSW Tag Team Championship (1 time) – with Ethan Allen
- Infinite Promotions
  - Infinite World Championship (1 time)
  - Infinite Lineage Championship (1 time, current)
  - Infinite Tag Team Championship (1 time) – with Ethan Allen
  - First Triple Crown Champion
- Progress Wrestling
  - PROGRESS World Championship (1 time)
  - Progress Wrestling Atlas Championship (1 time)
  - Progress Tag Team Championship (1 time) – with Ethan Allen
  - Second Triple Crown Champion
  - Super Strong Style 16 (2024)
  - Natural Progression Series (VII)
  - PROGRESS Atlas Title Tournament (2022)
- Pro Wrestling Illustrated
  - Ranked No. 36 of the top 500 singles wrestlers in the PWI 500 in 2025
- Revolution Pro Wrestling
  - Undisputed British Heavyweight Championship (1 time)
  - Undisputed British Cruiserweight Championship (1 time)
  - Undisputed British Tag Team Championship (1 time) – with Ethan Allen
  - Fourth Triple Crown Champion
  - Revolution Rumble (2024)
- Squash A Jobber Wrestling
  - SAJ Openweight Championship (1 time)
