= Kid Lykos =

English professional wrestler

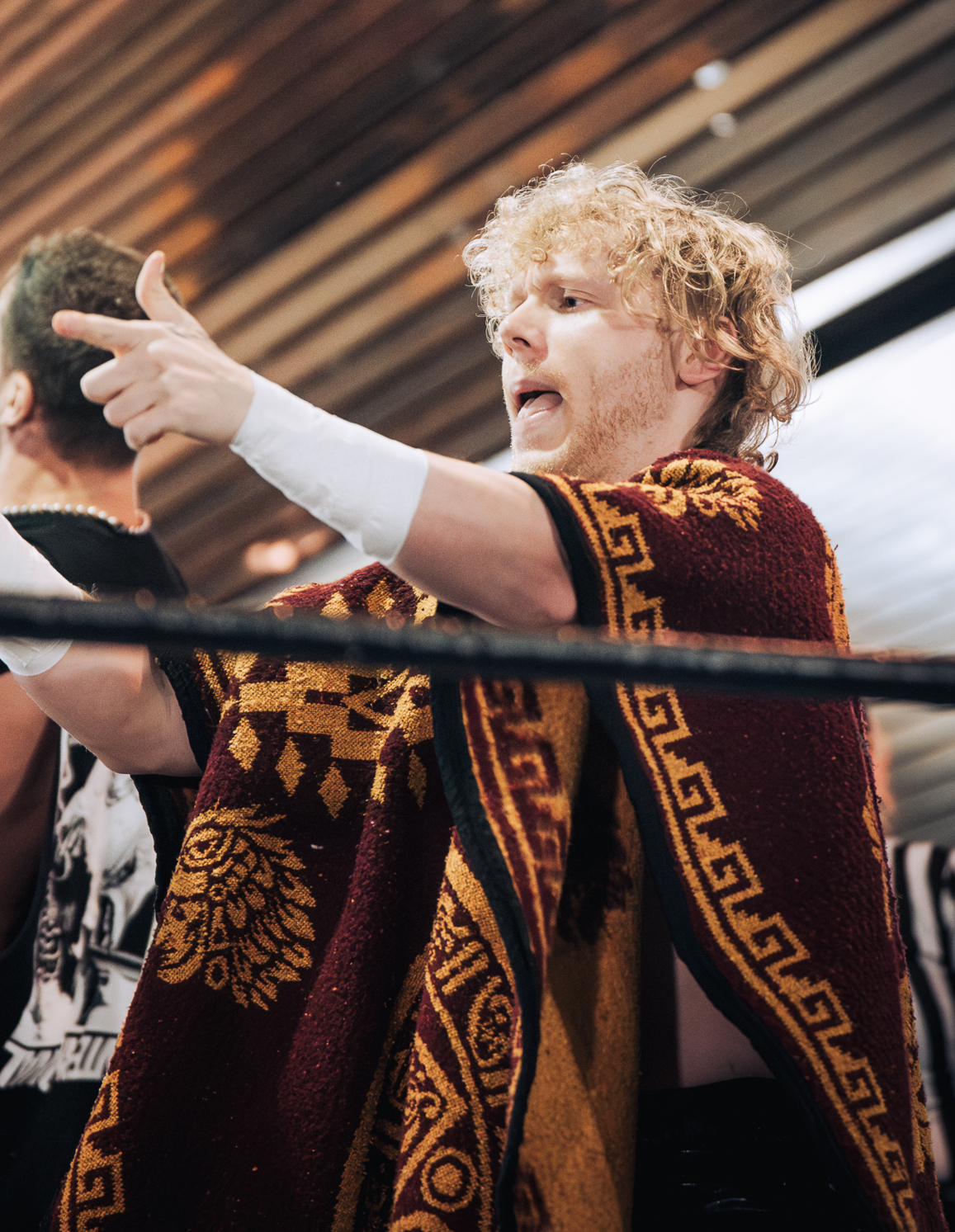
- Lykos in April 2024

Personal information
- Born: 22 March 1997 (age 29) Cambridge, England

Professional wrestling career
- Ring name(s): Crash Bandicoot; Ethan Beach; Ethan Silver; Kid Lykos
- Trained by: Mike Roberts
- Debut: 2011

Ethan Beach (born 22 March 1997) – better known by his ring name Kid Lykos – is an English professional wrestler, who currently performs on the British independent circuit.

== Professional wrestling career ==
=== European independent scene (2012–present) ===
Beach made his professional wrestling debut in Coventry Pro Wrestling at a house show entitled CPW TheOne promoted on 9 November 2012, where he went into a double count-out against Sky Blue Sam. He is known for his tenures with various promotions from the European independent scene with which he has shared brief or longer stints such as Attack! Pro Wrestling, Progress Wrestling, Revolution Pro Wrestling, International Pro Wrestling: United Kingdom, Over the Top Wrestling, Defiant Wrestling and many others.

=== Progress Wrestling (2017–present) ===
One of the promotions in which Beach is best known for working is Progress Wrestling. He made his debut in the company at PROGRESS Chapter 50: I Give It Six Months on 25 June 2017, where he teamed up with "CCK" tag team partner Chris Brookes to defeat British Strong Style (Trent Seven and Tyler Bate) to win the PROGRESS Tag Team Championship. They lost the titles at the very next pay-per-view, the Chapter 51: Screaming For PROGRESS from 9 July 2017, in a six-man tag team match where he and Brookes also teamed up with Travis Banks as they defended the championships under the freebird rule against British Strong Style (Pete Dunne, Trent Seven and Tyler Bate). He would go on to win the Progress tag team titles on two more occasions alongside Brookes, and one time alongside "Lykos Gym" tag team partner Kid Lykos II, lastly succeeding at Chapter 112: The Flowers Are Still Standing! on 5 June 2021, where they defeated The Young Guns (Luke Jacobs and Ethan Allen) to win the vacant titles. At Chapter 108: Of Course You Realize This Means War on 10 April 2021, Beach unsuccessfully challenged Cara Noir for the PROGRESS World Championship. At Chapter 131: 10th Anniversary Show on 25 March 2022, he teamed up with Kid Lykos II and competed in a five-way tag team gauntlet match for the Progress tag team titles won by The 0121 (Dan Moloney and Man Like DeReiss), and also involving the teams of The Smokin' Aces (Charlie Sterling and Nick Riley), Sunshine Machine (Chuck Mambo and TK Cooper) and North West Strong (Chris Ridgeway and Luke Jacobs). At Chapter 160: VENDETTA on 26 November 2023, Beach fell short to Spike Trivet in a match disputed for both the latter's PROGRESS World Championship and his very own mask. Beach revealed his true identity after the loss but continued to compete under the ring name of "Kid Lykos".

Beach competed in various of the promotion's signature events such as the Super Strong Style 16 where he made his first appearance at the 2022 edition which was also disputed for the vacant PROGRESS World Championship, in which he defeated Maggot in the first rounds but fell short to Warren Banks in the quarterfinals. He succeeded in winning the 2023 edition of the tournament by defeating Big Damo in the first rounds, Nick Wayne in the quarterfinals, Nathan Cruz in the semifinals and Mark Haskins in the finals. At Chapter 163: Twisted Metal on 25 February 2024, Beach would successfully defeat Spike Trivet in a steel cage match for the PROGRESS World Championship.

=== Revolution Pro Wrestling (2017–present) ===
Beach made his debut in Revolution Pro Wrestling at the 2017 edition of the Global Wars UK, a cross-over event promoted by both RevPro and New Japan Pro Wrestling, where he teamed up with CCK stablemates Chris Brookes and Travis Banks to defeat Chaos (Gedo, Hirooki Goto and Yoshi-Hashi). During the promotion, he chased for various championships created or promoted by the company. At SWE Happy Robbie Xmas on 29 December 2018, he teamed up with Chris Brookes and defeated The Jawdroppers (Sean Kustom and Xia Brookside) to win the SWE Tag Team Championship, title which was promoted by RevPro at that time. At RevPro Summer Sizzler 2022 on 23 July he teamed up with Kid Lykos II to unsuccessfully challenge Sunshine Machine (Chuck Mambo and TK Cooper) for the British Tag Team Championship. At RevPro Live In London 70 on 5 February 2023, he unsuccessfully challenged Robbie X for the Undisputed British Cruiserweight Championship.

He competed in various of the promotion's signature events such as the British J-Cup in which he made his first appearance at the 2021 edition of the tournament where he fell short to Mike Bailey in the first rounds. As for the Great British Tag League, he made his first appearance at the 2022 edition where he teamed up with Kid Lykos II, placing themselves in the Block B where they scored a total of two points after going against the teams of The VeloCities (Jude London and Paris De Silva), Sunshine Machine (Chuck Mambo and TK Cooper), and The Legion (Shota Umino and Yota Tsuji). At the 2023 edition, Beach teamed up with Kid Lykos II, placing themselves in the Block A of the competition where they scored a total of six points after going against the teams of The Billington Bulldogs (Mark Billington and Thomas Billington), Kieron Lacey and Mark Trew, and Anthony Ogogo and Ricky Knight Jr., failing to qualify for the finals.

=== Chikara (2017, 2019) ===
Beach briefly competed in Chikara, making his first appearance at the 2017 edition of the King of Trios tournament in which he teamed up with Chris Brookes and Elijah as "House Calamari" to defeat House Bike Cops (Dez Peloton (Donald Kluger and Jasper Tippins)) and Officer Warren Barksdale) in the first rounds and falling short to Casa Dorada (Juan Francisco de Coronado, Cornelius Crummels and Sonny Defarge) in the quarterfinals. On the third night of the event, Beach competed outside of the tournament's competition, taking part in a tag team gauntlet match in which he teamed up with Chris Brookes and fell short to the winners of the bout Los Ice Creams (El Hijo del Ice Cream and Ice Cream Jr.) and to various other notable teams such as The Rumblebees (Solo Darling and Travis Huckabee), The Throwbacks (Dasher Hatfield and Mark Angelosetti), Millie McKenzie and Omari, and others. Beach made a one-time return to the promotion on 5 April 2019, at CHIKARA Once Upon A Beginning where he teamed up with Brookes in a losing effort against Cornelius Crummels and Sonny Defarge in tag team action.

"Briefly ended his career in April 2019 due to several injuries"

=== Japanese independent circuit (2017, 2019, 2022) ===
Beach has worked for several promotions from the Japanese independent scene as a developmental talent sent by RevPro and Progress. He started with the cross-over event of Global Wars UK in 2017. He wrestled in two of Big Japan Pro Wrestling's events, first at BJW Big Ben Japan ~ Englishman In BJ on 5 January 2019, where he teamed up with Chris Brookes to defeat Kazuki Hashimoto and Yuya Aoki and secondly on 6 January at BJW Look Now where he again teamed up with Brookes, this time to defeat Kota Sekifuda and Tatsuhiko Yoshino. In 2022, Beach competed in a couple of events promoted by DDT Pro-Wrestling. First of them was the DDT Konosuke Takeshita 10th Anniversary from 10 September where he teamed up with Chris Brookes in a losing effort against Takeshita himself and his The37Kamiina stablemate Yuki Ueno. At DDT Who's Gonna Top? 2022 Tour In Asakusa on 13 September Beach teamed up again with Brookes to defeat Hideki Okatani and Takeshi Masada. He also competed in an event promoted by Gatoh Move Pro Wrestling, the Gatoh Move 10th Anniversary ~ Phoenix Rises from 15 September 2022, where he teamed up with Kaori Yoneyama and Minoru Fujita to defeat Baliyan Akki, Riho and Saki.

=== Pro Wrestling Noah (2024, 2026-present) ===
Beach appeared for Pro Wrestling Noah on their tour of the United Kingdom in 2024, during which he and Kid Lykos II unsuccessfully challenged Hayata and Yo-Hey for the GHC Junior Heavyweight Tag Team Championship. On April 12, 2026, Beach made his Japanese Noah debut at Apex Conquest in Nagoya alongside Lykos II, where they unsuccessfully challenged Alejandro and Dragon Bane for the GHC Junior Heavyweight Tag Team Championship.

== Professional wrestling style and personal ==
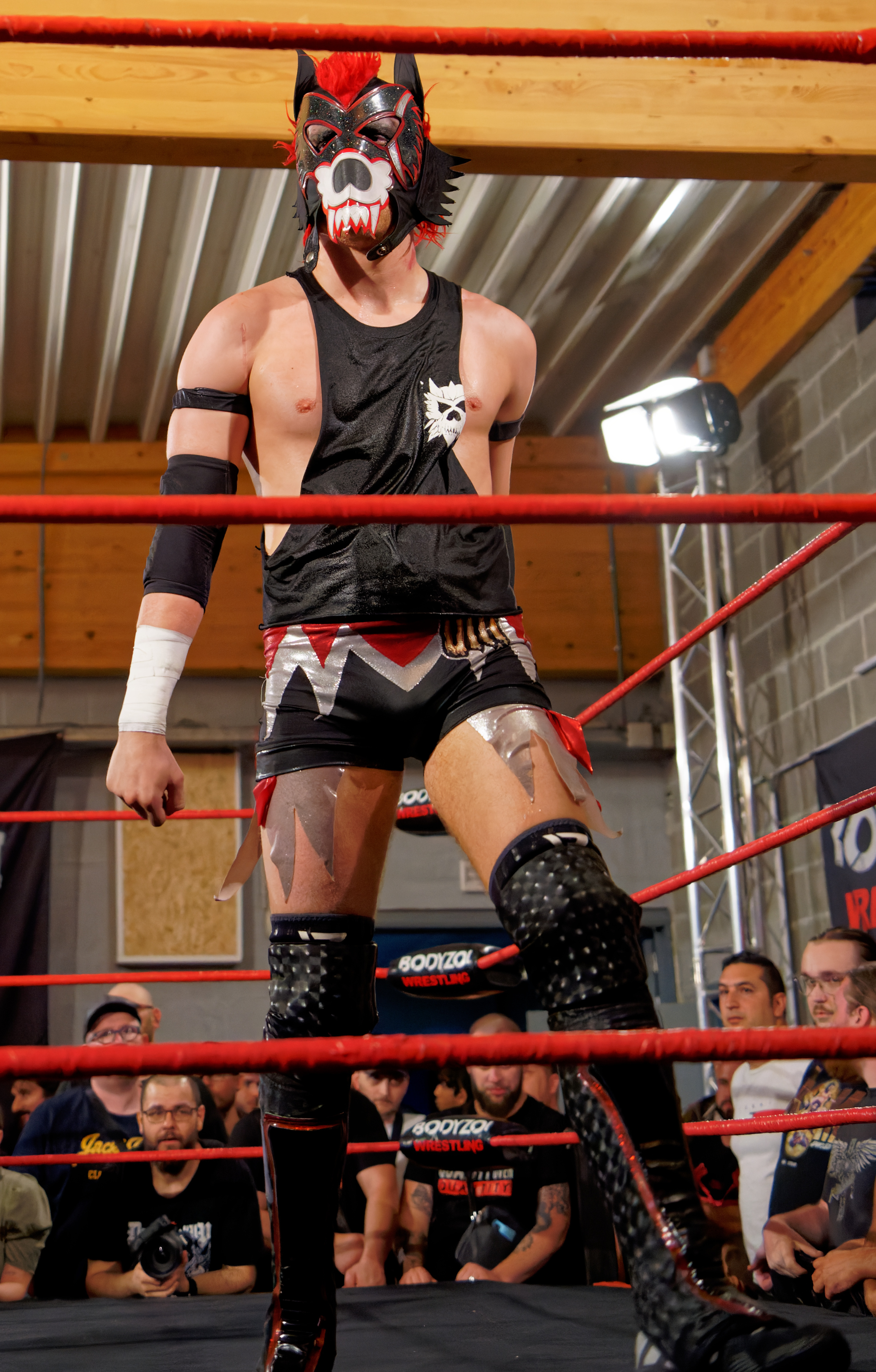
Lykos during his masked era.

For most of his career, Beach competed as a luchador enmascarado (masked wrestler). However, contrary to the lucha libre traditions, his real name was a matter of public record all along. Kid Lykos II (Joe Newboult) shares the same type of wrestling gimmick with Beach, as they've been competing under the tag name of "Lykos Gym" since 2021. Beach wanted to take the decision of making Newboult the one to take the Lykos moniker after temporarily retiring from professional wrestling at the beginning of 2020. Beach returned in February 2021 and they competed as a team with same gimmicks until late 2023 when he lost the mask to Spike Trivet.

== Championships and accomplishments ==
- Attack! Pro Wrestling
  - Attack! 24:7 Championship (2 times)
  - Attack! Tag Team Championship (4 times) – with Chris Brookes
- Burning Heart Pro Wrestling
  - Burning Heart World Championship (1 time, current)
- Britannia Wrestling Promotions
  - BWP Rookie Division Tag Team Championship (1 time) – with Drew Parker
  - BWP World Tag Team Championship (1 time) – with Drew Parker
- Coventry Pro Wrestling
  - CPW Heavyweight Championship (1 time)
- Combat Zone Wrestling
  - CZW World Tag Team Championship (1 time) – with Chris Brookes
- Dragon Pro Wrestling
  - Dragon Pro Tag Team Championship (1 time) – with Drew Parker
- Fight Club: PRO
  - FCP Tag Team Championship (1 time) – with Chris Brookes
  - Dream Tag Team Invitational (2017) – with Chris Brookes
- Modern Nomad Pro Wrestling
  - MDRN NMD Superior Shedhouse Championship (1 time)
- Hope Wrestling
  - Hope Tag Team Championship (1 time) – with Chris Brookes
- Knockout Wrestling
  - KOW Heavyweight Championship (1 time)
- North Wrestling
  - North Tag Team Championship (1 time) – with Kid Lykos II
- Pro Wrestling Illustrated
  - Ranked No. 111 of the top 500 singles wrestlers in the PWI 500 in 2024
  - Ranked No. 66 of the top 100 tag teams in the PWI Tag Team 100 of 2023 – with Kid Lykos II
- Progress Wrestling
  - PROGRESS World Championship (1 time)
  - PROGRESS Tag Team Championship (5 times)– with Chris Brookes (3) and Kid Lykos II (2)
  - PROGRESS Tag Team Title Tournament (2021) – with Kid Lykos II
  - Super Strong Style 16 ((2023)
  - Thunderbastard (2024)
- Wrestling Resurgence
  - Resurgence Arthouse Championship (1 time)
- Revolution Pro Wrestling
  - SWE Tag Team Championship (1 time) – with Chris Brookes
- Target Wrestling
  - Target Wrestling Tag Team Championship (1 time) – with Kid Lykos II
- TNT Extreme Wrestling
  - TNT Tag Team Championship (1 time) – with Kid Lykos II

Classement PWI 500
Year	2017	2018	2019	2020	2021	2022	2023
Rank	293	–	–	–	▲259	–	▼317

== Luchas de Apuestas record ==
Winner (wager)	Loser (wager)	Location	Event	Date	Notes
Kid Lykos (mask)	Chuck Mambo (hair)	London, England	PROGRESS Chapter 146: They Think It's All Over...	27 November 2022	
Spike Trivet (title)	Kid Lykos (mask)	London, England	PROGRESS Chapter 160: VENDETTA	26 November 2023	
