= List of major Progress Wrestling events =

List of pay-per-view events produced by Progress Wrestling

Progress Wrestling is a British professional wrestling promotion that was established in 2011. During the years, the promotion has held various notable pay-per-view events which feature professional wrestling matches that resulted from scripted storylines, where wrestlers portrayed villains, heroes, or less distinguishable characters in the scripted events that built tension and culminated in a wrestling match or series of matches.

== Annual tournaments ==
| Tournament | Latest winner(s) | Date won | Notes |
|---|---|---|---|
| Super Strong Style 16 | Man Like DeReiss | May 5, 2025 | Round-robin tournament with a head-to-head final match. |
| Natural Progression Series | Ricky Knight Jr. | November 27, 2022 | Round-robin tournament with a head-to-head final match. |

== Shared tournaments ==
Progress Wrestling shared business partnerships with WWE between 2016 and 2023 with shows airing on WWE Network and on the Demand PROGRESS streaming service.

- Cruiserweight Classic
- WWE United Kingdom Championship Tournament

== Chapters and past events ==
The promotion's signature multiple monthly pay-per-view events are taking place under the conceptual name of "Progress Chapters". The first-ever event of its kind, the Chapter One: In The Beginning took place on March 25, 2012, at The Garage venue in London. The regular venue for most of the Chapters is the Electric Ballroom. Starting with 2017, Progress aired the Chapter events on the Pivotshare service as VOD events. In 2023, Progress left the WWE Network service under which the events were broadcast to continue airing them on the Demand PROGRESS streaming service.

=== 2012 ===
| Event | Date | Location | Venue | Main event | Ref |
|---|---|---|---|---|---|
| Chapter One: In The Beginning | March 25, 2012 | London, England | The Garage | Nathan Cruz vs. El Ligero, Marty Scurll and Mike Mason for the inaugural PROGRESS World Championship | |
| Chapter Two: The March Of Progress | June 24, 2012 | London, England | The Garage | Nathan Cruz (c) vs. Marty Scurll for the PROGRESS World Championship | |
| Chapter Three: Fifty Shades Of Pain | September 30, 2012 | London, England | The Garage | Dave Mastiff and Greg Burridge vs. El Ligero and Nathan Cruz | |

=== 2023 ===
| Event | Date | Location | Venue | Main event | Ref |
|---|---|---|---|---|---|
| Chapter 151: Heavy Metal | April 23, 2023 | London, England | Electric Ballroom | Spike Trivet (c) vs. Cara Noir for the PROGRESS World Championship | |
| Chapter 152: For The Love Of Progress | April 28, 2023 | Manchester, England | Bowlers BEC Arena | Dominatus Regnum (Bullit, Charlie Sterling, Nick Riley and Spike Trivet) vs. SAnitY (Axel Tischer and Big Damo) and Sunshine Machine (Chuck Mambo and TK Cooper) | |
| Super Strong Style 16 | May 27, 2023 | London, England | The Dome | Will Ospreay vs. Tate Mayfairs in the Super Strong Style 16 first rounds | |
| Super Strong Style 16 | May 28, 2023 | London, England | Electric Ballroom | Sunshine Machine (Chuck Mambo and TK Cooper) (c) vs. Smokin' Aces (Charlie Sterling and Nick Riley) for the PROGRESS Tag Team Championship | |
| Super Strong Style 16 | May 29, 2023 | London, England | Electric Ballroom | Kid Lykos vs. Mark Haskins in the Super Strong Style 16 finals | |
| DEFY x Progress Toronto | June 25, 2023 | Toronto, Canada | Toronto Rec Room | The Bollywood Boyz (Gurv Sihra and Harv Sihra) (c) vs. Matt Cross and Psycho Mike for the DEFY Tag Team Championship | |
| Chapter 154: It's Clobberin' Time | August 26, 2023 | London, England | Electric Ballroom | Mark Haskins (with Vicky Haskins) vs. Leon Slater | |
| Chapter 155: Feel The Noize | September 9, 2023 | Birmingham, England | O2 Academy Birmingham | Ricky Knight Jr. (c) vs. Yoshiki Inamura for the Progress Atlas Championship | |
| Chapter 156: Steal Yourself | September 10, 2023 | Sheffield, England | O2 Academy Sheffield | Dan Moloney, Kid Lykos and Luke Jacobs vs. Dominatus Regnum (Charlie Sterling, Nick Riley and Spike Trivet) | |
| Chapter 157: Hungry Like The Wolf | September 24, 2023 | London, England | Electric Ballroom | Spike Trivet (c) vs. Kid Lykos for the PROGRESS World Championship | |
| Chapter 158: The Long Halloween | October 22, 2023 | London, England | Electric Ballroom | Lykos Gym (Kid Lykos and Kid Lykos II) vs. Smokin' Aces (Charlie Sterling and Nick Riley) | |
| Chapter 159: Wonderbrawl | November 12, 2023 | Manchester, England | O2 Ritz | Rhio (c) vs. Lana Austin for the Progress World Women's Championship | |
| Chapter 160: Vendetta | November 26, 2023 | London, England | Electric Ballroom | Spike Trivet (c) vs. Kid Lykos in a No disqualification title vs. mask match for the PROGRESS World Championship | |
| Chapter 161: Unboxing VI And A Movie | December 30, 2023 | London, England | Electric Ballroom | Kid Lykos vs. Eddie Dennis | |

=== 2024 ===
| Event | Date | Location | Venue | Main event | Ref |
|---|---|---|---|---|---|
| Chapter 162: The Light Of The Dragon | January 28, 2024 | London, England | Electric Ballroom | Kid Lykos vs. Connor Mills vs. Gene Munny vs. Luke Jacobs vs. Mark Haskins vs. Tate Mayfairs vs. Yoichi for the #1 contendership to the PROGRESS World Championship | |
| Chapter 163: Twisted Metal | February 25, 2024 | London, England | Electric Ballroom | Spike Trivet (c) vs. Kid Lykos for the PROGRESS World Championship | |
| Chapter 164: For The Love Of Progress 2 | March 1, 2024 | Manchester, England | Bowlers BEC Arena | Rhio (c) vs. Debbie Keitel for the Progress World Women's Championship | |
| Chapter 165: Diamond Dust | March 7, 2024 | London, England | The Dome | Kid Lykos (c) vs. Lio Rush for the PROGRESS World Championship | |
| Chapter 166: Freedom Walks Again | April 5, 2024 | Philadelphia, Pennsylvania | Penns Landing Caterers | Kid Lykos (c) vs. Man Like DeReiss for the PROGRESS World Championship | |
| Chapter 167: One Bump Or Two? | April 21, 2024 | London, England | Electric Ballroom | Sanity (Big Damo and Axel Tischer) (c) vs. Lykos Gym (Kid Lykos and Kid Lykos II) for the PROGRESS Tag Team Championship | |
| Super Strong Style 16 | May 26, 2024 | London, England | Electric Ballroom | Kid Lykos (c) vs. Mark Haskins for the PROGRESS World Championship | |
| Super Strong Style 16 | May 27, 2024 | London, England | Electric Ballroom | Luke Jacobs vs. Ricky Knight Jr. in the Super Strong Style 16 finals | |
| Chapter 169: The Devil On My Shoulder | July 28, 2024 | London, England | Electric Ballroom | Kid Lykos (c) vs. Luke Jacobs for the PROGRESS World Championship | |
| Chapter 170: Wrestling Never Sleeps | August 26, 2024 | London, England | Electric Ballroom | Luke Jacobs (c) vs. Kid Lykos for the PROGRESS World Championship | |
| Chapter 171: History Is Written By The Victors | September 22, 2024 | London, England | Electric Ballroom | Luke Jacobs (c) vs. Eddie Dennis for the PROGRESS World Championship | |
| Progress x Noah x DEFY | October 5, 2024 | Oberhausen, Germany | Turbinenhalle Oberhausen | Luke Jacobs (c) vs. Timothy Thatcher for the PROGRESS World Championship | |
| Chapter 172: Werewolves of London | October 27, 2024 | London, England | Electric Ballroom | Rhio (c) vs. Lizzy Evo for the Progress World Women's Championship | |
| Chapter 173: Stay Young & Invincible | November 17, 2024 | Manchester, England | O2 Ritz | Boisterous Behaviour (Leon Slater and Man Like DeReiss) vs. Young Guns (Ethan Allen and Luke Jacobs) | |
| Chapter 174: Vendetta 2 | November 24, 2024 | London, England | Electric Ballroom | Luke Jacobs (c) vs. Leon Slater for the PROGRESS World Championship | |
| DEFY x Progress Onslaught | November 29, 2024 | Brooklyn, NY | Roulette Intermedium | Luke Jacobs (c) vs. Kevin Knight for the PROGRESS World Championship | |
| DEFY x Progress Onslaught | December 1, 2024 | Chicago, IL | Thalia Hall | Luke Jacobs (c) vs. Man Like DeReiss for the PROGRESS World Championship | |
| Chapter 175: Unboxing VII: The Curtain Call | December 29, 2024 | London, England | Electric Ballroom | Luke Jacobs (c) vs. Leon Slater vs. Man Like DeReiss vs. Ricky Knight Jr. to retain the PROGRESS World Championship | |

=== 2025 ===
| Event | Date | Location | Venue | Main event | Ref |
|---|---|---|---|---|---|
| Chapter 176: For The Love of Progress 3 | February 14, 2025 | Manchester, England | Bowlers BEC Arena | Simon Miller (c) vs. Charles Crowley for the Progress Proteus Championship | |
| Chapter 177: My Own Destiny | February 23, 2025 | London, England | Electric Ballroom | Meiko Satomura vs. Rhio | |
| Chapter 178: Fix Your Hearts | March 30, 2025 | London, England | Electric Ballroom | Smokin' Aces (Charlie Sterling and Nick Riley) (c) vs. Sunshine Machine (Chuck Mambo and TK Cooper) for the PROGRESS Tag Team Championship | |
| Chapter 179: Progress Las Vegas | April 17, 2025 | Las Vegas, Nevada | Pearl Theatre | Luke Jacobs (c) vs. Michael Oku for the PROGRESS World Championship | |
| Super Strong Style 16 | May 4, 2025 | London, England | Electric Ballroom | Nina Samuels (c) vs. Rhio in a Title vs. PROGRESS Career match for the PROGRESS Women's Championship | |
| Super Strong Style 16 | May 5, 2025 | London, England | Electric Ballroom | Man Like DeReiss vs. Leon Slater in the Super Strong Style 16 tournament final | |
| Chapter 181: Far From Ordinary People | June 29, 2025 | Manchester, England | O2 Ritz | Luke Jacobs (c) vs. Cara Noir for the PROGRESS World Championship | |
| Chapter 182: Stay Humble | July 27, 2025 | London, England | Electric Ballroom | Rhio (c) vs. Kanji vs. Rayne Leverkusen for the Progress World Women's Championship | |
| Chapter 183: Hundred Volts | August 25, 2025 | London, England | Electric Ballroom | Luke Jacobs (c) vs. Man Like DeReiss for the PROGRESS World Championship | |
| Chapter 184: Camden Lock Up | September 28, 2025 | London, England | Electric Ballroom | Kanji defeated Nina Samuels in a Loser Leaves Progress match | |
| Chapter 185: Jump In The Line | October 26, 2025 | London, England | Electric Ballroom | Lykos Gym (Kid Lykos and Kid Lykos II) (c) vs. Sunshine Machine (Chuck Mambo and TK Cooper) vs. Diamond Eyes (Connor Mills and Nico Angelo) for the PROGRESS Tag Team Championship | |
| Chapter 186: Noisy Neighbours | November 16, 2025 | Manchester, England | O2 Ritz | Cara Noir vs. Lio Rush | |
| Chapter 187: Vendetta 3 | November 30, 2025 | London, England | Electric Ballroom | Man Like DeReiss (c) vs. Tate Mayfairs for the PROGRESS World Championship | |
| Chapter 188: Unboxing VIII: The Search For Socks | December 28, 2025 | London, England | Electric Ballroom | Rayne Leverkusen (c) vs. Kanji for the Progress World Women's Championship | |

=== 2026 ===
| Event | Date | Location | Venue | Main event | Ref |
|---|---|---|---|---|---|
| Chapter 189: In Darkest Night | January 25, 2026 | London, England | Electric Ballroom | Rayne Leverkusen (c) vs. Alexxis Falcon for the Progress World Women's Championship | |
| Chapter 190: In Brightest Day | February 15, 2026 | London, England | Electric Ballroom | Alexxis Falcon (c) vs. Rhio for the Progress World Women's Championship | |
| Chapter 191: For The Love Of Progress 4 | February 20, 2026 | Manchester, England | Bowlers BEC Arena | Charles Crowley, Man Like DeReiss and Simon Miller vs. Bullit, Jack Morris and Saxon Huxley | |
| Chapter 192: Cause & Effect | March 29, 2026 | London, England | Electric Ballroom | Man Like DeReiss (c) vs. Kid Lykos for the PROGRESS World Championship | |
| Chapter 193: Progress Las Vegas II | April 16, 2026 | Paradise, Nevada | Horseshoe Las Vegas | Man Like DeReiss (c) vs. Michael Oku for the PROGRESS World Championship | |
| Chapter 194: Super Strong Style 16 Tournament Edition 2026 | May 3, 2026 | London, England | Electric Ballroom | Man Like DeReiss (c) vs. Cara Noir for the PROGRESS World Championship | |
| Chapter 194: Super Strong Style 16 Tournament Edition 2026 | May 4, 2026 | London, England | Electric Ballroom | Charles Crowley vs. Charlie Sterling in the Men's Super Strong Style 16 tournament final | |
| Chapter 195: Wonderbrawl II | June 7, 2026 | Manchester, England | O2 Ritz | Young Guns (Ethan Allen and Luke Jacobs) (c) vs. The 0121 (Drilla Moloney and Man Like DeReiss) for the PROGRESS Tag Team Championship | |
| Chapter 196: Scorchio | July 26, 2026 | London, England | Electric Ballroom | Cara Noir (c) vs. Charles Crowley for the PROGRESS World Championship | |
| Chapter 197: Wrestling Over Everything | August 31, 2026 | London, England | Electric Ballroom | Cara Noir (c) vs. Spike Trivet for the PROGRESS World Championship | |
| Chapter 198: When September Ends | September 27, 2026 | London, England | Electric Ballroom | Malakai Black (c) vs. Cara Noir for the Progress World Championship | |
| Chapter 199: Bonestorm | October 25, 2026 | London, England | Electric Ballroom | Simon Miller vs. Gene Munny vs. Man Like DeReiss vs. Ricky Knight Jr. vs. Drilla Moloney in a #1 contendership ThunderBastard match for the Progress World Championship | |

==== Upcoming events ====
| Event | Date | Location | Venue | Main event | Ref |
|---|---|---|---|---|---|
| Chapter 200: Vendetta 4 | 29 November 2026 | London, England | Electric Ballroom | Cara Noir (c) vs. Charles Crowley for the PROGRESS World Championship | |
