= Progress Chapter 161: Unboxing VI And A Movie =

2023 Progress Wrestling event

- Promotional poster of the event
- Promotion: Progress Wrestling
- Date: 30 December 2023 (Aired 5 January 2024)
- City: London, England
- Venue: Electric Ballroom
- Attendance: cca. 700

Event chronology
← Previous; Chapter 160: Vendetta	Next → Chapter 162: The Light Of The Dragon

Unboxing chronology
← Previous; Chapter 147: Unboxing Live V - Deal Or No Deal	Next → Chapter 175: Unboxing VII: The Curtain Call

The Chapter 161: Unboxing VI And A Movie was a professional wrestling event produced by Progress Wrestling. It took place on 30 December 2023, in London, England at Electric Ballroom.

Eight matches were contested at the event. In the main event, Kid Lykos defeated Eddie Dennis.

== Production ==
=== Storylines ===
The event included matches that each resulted from scripted storylines, where wrestlers portrayed heroes, villains, or less distinguishable characters in scripted events that built tension and culminated in a wrestling match or series of matches. Results were predetermined by Progress' creative writers, while storylines were produced on Progress' events airing on the Demand PROGRESS streaming service.

As the "Unboxing" category of Progress Chapters tradition hints, the pay-per-view's entire match card was revealed on the night of the event.

=== Event ===
The event started with the tag team confrontation between Sunshine Machine (Chuck Mambo and TK Cooper), Kieron Lacey and Mark Trew, and Big Damo and Axel Tischer, solded with the victory of the latter team. Next up, Yoichi picked up a victory over Charlie Sterling and Kid Lykos II in three-way competition. The third bout saw Dan Moloney and Man Like DeReiss outmatch Bruno Brown, Durag, Malik and Roadfam in a four-on-two handicap match. Next up, Tate Mayfairs defeated Simon Miller in singles competition. In the fifth bout, LA Taylor and Skye Smitson defeated Millie McKenzie and Session Moth Martina in tag team competition. Next up, PROGRESS World Champion Spike Trivet defeat Wild Boar in a non-title bout. In the semi main event, Rhio defeated Nina Samuels to secure the third consecutive defense of the Progress World Women's Championship in that respective reign.

In the main event, Kid Lykos defeated Eddie Dennis in singles competition.

== Results ==
No.	Results	Stipulations	Times
1	Sanity (Big Damo and Axel Tischer) defeated Kieron Lacey and Mark Trew and Sunshine Machine (Chuck Mambo and TK Cooper) by pinfall	Three-way tag team match	10:18
2	Yoichi defeated Charlie Sterling and Kid Lykos II by pinfall	Three-way match	14:07
3	0121 (Dan Moloney and Man Like DeReiss) defeated Bruno Brown, Durag, Malik and Roadfam by pinfall	Four-on-two handicap match	10:58
4	Tate Mayfairs defeated Simon Miller by pinfall	Singles match	27:56
5	LA Taylor and Skye Smitson defeated Millie McKenzie and Session Moth Martina by pinfall	Tag team match	8:20
6	Spike Trivet defeated Wild Boar by pinfall	Singles match	13:05
7	Rhio (c) defeated Nina Samuels by pinfall	Singles match for the Progress World Women's Championship	12:02
8	Kid Lykos defeated Eddie Dennis by pinfall	Singles match	17:16
(c) / – the champion(s) heading into the match
