= Progress Chapter 160: Vendetta =

2023 Progress Wrestling event

- Promotional poster of the event
- Promotion: Progress Wrestling
- Date: 26 November 2023 (Aired 1 December 2023)
- City: London, England
- Venue: Electric Ballroom
- Attendance: cca. 700

Event chronology
← Previous; Chapter 159: Wonderbrawl	Next → Chapter 161: Unboxing VI And A Movie

The Chapter 160: Vendetta was a professional wrestling event produced by Progress Wrestling. It took place on 26 November 2023, in London, England at Electric Ballroom.

Nine matches were contested at the event. In the main event, Spike Trivet defeated Kid Lykos in a No Disqualification title vs. mask match to retain the PROGRESS World Championship, resulting in Lykos having to unmask after the match.

== Production ==
=== Storylines ===
The event included matches that each resulted from scripted storylines, where wrestlers portrayed heroes, villains, or less distinguishable characters in scripted events that built tension and culminated in a wrestling match or series of matches. Results were predetermined by Progress' creative writers, while storylines were produced on Progress' events airing on the Demand PROGRESS streaming service.

=== Event ===
The event started with the singles confrontation between Luke Jacobs and Ricky Knight Jr. for the Progress Atlas Championship, solded with Knight Jr. retaining the title and securing the sixth consecutive defense of the title in that respective reign. Next up, Leon Slater picked up a victory over Connor Mills in singles competition. The third bout saw Tate Mayfairs defeat Paul Robinson in another singles match. In the fourth bout, Alexxis Falcon and Charles Crowley outmatched Lana Austin and Rob Drake in an intergender tag team match. Next up, Gene Munny defeated Warren Banks in singles competition. In the sixth bout, Big Damo, Axel Tischer and Eric Young reunited as Sanity three years after leaving WWE and defeated Bullit, Charlie Sterling and Nick Riley in six-man tag team competition.

Next up, Rhio defeated Kanji and Lizzy Evo to secure the second consecutive defense of the Progress World Women's Championship in that respective reign. In the semi main event, Yoichi defeated Shigehiro Irie in singles competition.

In the main event, Spike Trivet defeated Kid Lykos in a No disqualification title vs. mask match to secure the fifteenth consecutive defense of the PROGRESS World Championship in that respective reign. Giving the stipulation, Lykos unmasked after the bout concluded.

== Results ==
No.	Results	Stipulations	Times
1	Ricky Knight Jr. (c) defeated Luke Jacobs by pinfall	Singles match for the Progress Atlas Championship	15:14
2	Leon Slater defeated Connor Mills by pinfall	Singles match	8:55
3	Tate Mayfairs defeated Paul Robinson (with Malik) by pinfall	Singles match	6:41
4	Cheeky Little Buggers (Alexxis Falcon and Charles Crowley) defeated Lana Austin and Rob Drake by pinfall	Intergender tag team match	7:36
5	Gene Munny defeated Warren Banks by pinfall	Singles match	19:07
6	Sanity (Big Damo, Axel Tischer and Eric Young) defeated Bullit and Smokin' Aces (Charlie Sterling and Nick Riley) by pinfall	Six-man tag team match	13:05
7	Rhio (c) defeated Kanji and Lizzy Evo by pinfall	Three-way match for the Progress World Women's Championship	10:13
8	Yoichi defeated Shigehiro Irie	Singles match	13:49
9	Spike Trivet (c) defeated Kid Lykos	No disqualification title vs. mask match for the PROGRESS World Championship	37:44
(c) / – the champion(s) heading into the match
