= Progress Chapter 175: Unboxing VII: The Curtain Call =

2024 Progress Wrestling event

Chapter 175: Unboxing VII: The Curtain Call
- Promotional poster of the event
- Promotion: Progress Wrestling
- Date: 29 December 2024
- City: London, England
- Venue: Electric Ballroom
- Attendance: cca. 700

Event chronology
← Previous; DEFY x Progress Onslaught	Next → Chapter 176: For The Love Of Progress 3

Unboxing chronology
← Previous; Chapter 161: Unboxing VI And A Movie	Next → Chapter 188: Unboxing VIII: The Search For Socks

The Chapter 175: Unboxing VII: The Curtain Call was a professional wrestling event produced by Progress Wrestling. It took place on 29 December 2024, in London, England, at the Electric Ballroom. The event aired domestically on Triller TV.

Eight matches were contested at the event. The main event saw Luke Jacobs defeat Leon Slater, Man Like DeReiss and Ricky Knight Jr. in a four-way match to retain the PROGRESS World Championship.

== Production ==
=== Storylines ===
The event included matches that each resulted from scripted storylines, where wrestlers portrayed heroes, villains, or less distinguishable characters in scripted events that built tension and culminated in a wrestling match or series of matches. Results were predetermined by Progress' creative writers, while storylines were produced on Progress' events airing on the Demand PROGRESS streaming service.

As the "Unboxing" category of Progress Chapters tradition hints, the pay-per-view's entire match card was revealed on the night of the event.

=== Event ===
The event started with the singles confrontation between El Hijo del Vikingo and Kid Lykos II which ended by referee stoppage after Vikingo sustained an injury during match. Next up, Axel Tischer defeated Sanity stablemate and the time's partner in the Progress Wrestling Tag Team Championship Big Damo to retain the Progress Atlas Championship for the second consecutive time in that respective reign. The third bout saw Alexxis Falcon defeating "Cheeky Little Boogers" tag team partner Charles Crowley. After the bout concluded, Falcon and Crowley announced that their tag team would split on order to pursue singles careers. In the fourth bout, Michael Oku defeated Mark Haskins in singles competition. Next up, Smokin' Aces (Charlie Sterling and Nick Riley) defeated Mothdog (Gene Munny and Will Kroos) and Simon Miller and Jerry Bakewell to secure the third consecutive defense of the Progress Tag Team Championship in that respective reign. The sixth bout saw Tate Mayfairs last eliminating Eddie Dennis to win the traditional Thunderbastard match. In the semi main event, Nina Samuels defeated Rhio to win the Progress World Women's Championship, ending the latter's reign at 434 days and 20 defenses which was a record at the time.

In the main event, Luke Jacobs defeated Leon Slater, Man Like DeReiss and Ricky Knight Jr. to secure the ninth consecutive defense of the PROGRESS World Championship in that respective reign. After the bout concluded, Jacobs was confronted by Tate Mayfairs who won the Thunderbastard match earlier that night and chose the World Championship in a bout set to occur at Chapter 177: My Own Destiny on February 23, 2025.

== Results ==
No.	Results	Stipulations	Times
1	El Hijo del Vikingo vs. Kid Lykos II ended in a no contest	Singles match	16:00
2	Axel Tischer (c) defeated Big Damo by pinfall	Singles match for the Progress Atlas Championship	9:25
3	Alexxis Falcon defeated Charles Crowley by pinfall	Singles match	12:08
4	Michael Oku (with Amira Blair) defeated Mark Haskins (with Vicky Haskins) by pinfall	Singles match	20:24
5	Smokin' Aces (Charlie Sterling and Nick Riley) (c) defeated Simon Miller and Jerry Bakewell and Mothdog (Gene Munny and Will Kroos) by pinfall	Three-way tornado tag team match for the Progress Tag Team Championship	8:34
6	Tate Mayfairs won by last eliminating Eddie Dennis	Thunderbastard match Gauntlet-rumble match in which the winner gets to challenge for a championship of their choice.	30:03
7	Nina Samuels defeated Rhio (c) by pinfall	Singles match for the Progress World Women's Championship	0:15
8	Luke Jacobs (c) defeated Leon Slater, Man Like DeReiss and Ricky Knight Jr. by pinfall	Four-way match for the PROGRESS World Championship	19:24
(c) / – the champion(s) heading into the match

=== Thunderbastard match entrances and eliminations ===
Draw	Entrant	Order	Eliminated by	Elimination(s)
1	Kid Lykos	3	Lana Austin	0
2	Rayne Leverkusen	4	Lana Austin	1
3	Session Moth Martina	1	Rayne Leverkusen	0
4	Eddie Dennis	6	Tate Mayfairs	0
5	Tate Mayfairs	–	Winner	2
6	Lana Austin	5	Tate Mayfairs	2
7	Nico Angelo	2	Disqualified	0
