= Progress Chapter 182: Stay Humble =

2025 Progress Wrestling event

Chapter 182: Stay Humble
- Promotional poster of the event
- Promotion: Progress Wrestling
- Date: 27 July 2025
- City: London, England
- Venue: Electric Ballroom
- Attendance: cca. 600

Event chronology
| ← Previous; Chapter 181: Far From Ordinary People | Next → Chapter 183: Hundred Volts |

The Chapter 182: Stay Humble was a professional wrestling event produced by Progress Wrestling. It took place on 27 July 2025 in London, England, at the Electric Ballroom.

Six matches were contested at the event. The main event saw a three-way match involving Rhio, Kanji, and Rayne Leverkusen for the Progress World Women's Championship end in a draw.

== Production ==
=== Storylines ===
The event included matches that each resulted from scripted storylines, where wrestlers portrayed heroes, villains, or less distinguishable characters in scripted events that built tension and culminated in a wrestling match or series of matches. Results were predetermined by Progress' creative writers, while storylines were produced on Progress' events airing on the Demand PROGRESS streaming service.

=== Event ===
The event started with the singles confrontation between Adam Maxted and Tate Mayfairs, solded with the victory of the latter. Next up, Simon Miller wrestled Charles Crowley in a no-contest in a bout to determine the #1 contender to the Progress Proteus Championship. In the third bout, Mike D Vecchio defeated Axel Tischer to win the Progress Atlas Championship, ending the latter's reign at 426 days and two defenses. Next up, Charlie Sterling picked up a victory over Cara Noir in singles competition. In the semi main event, Session Moth Martina defeated Hollie Barlow in singles competition after Lana Austin convinced Barlow to compete in her place. During the event, PROGRESS World Champion Luke Jacobs and Man Like DeReiss confronted each other as a match for the world title between the two was scheduled for Chapter 183 on August 25, 2025.

In the main event, Rhio wrestled Kanji and Rayne Leverkusen into a draw after a controversial pin, rendering Rhio as the retainer of the Progress World Women's Championship who marked the first successful defense of that reign. A rematch between Rhio and Kanji was scheduled for Chapter 183 on August 25, 2025.

== Results ==
| No. | Results | Stipulations | Times |
|---|---|---|---|
| 1 | Tate Mayfairs defeated Adam Maxted by pinfall | Singles match | 6:39 |
| 2 | Simon Miller vs. Charles Crowley ended in a no contest | Singles match to determine the #1 contender to the Progress Proteus Championship | 9:02 |
| 3 | Mike D Vecchio defeated Axel Tischer (c) | Tables match for the Progress Atlas Championship | 14:20 |
| 4 | Charlie Sterling defeated Cara Noir by pinfall | Singles match | 18:22 |
| 5 | Session Moth Martina defeated Hollie Barlow (with Lana Austin) (Note: The match was initially scheduled to feature Lana Austin, who manipulated Barlow to take her place in the bout.) by pinfall | Singles match | 4:26 |
| 6 | Rhio (c) vs. Kanji vs. Rayne Leverkusen ended in a draw | Three-way match for the Progress World Women's Championship | 14:47 |
(c) / – the champion(s) heading into the match
