= Progress Chapter 152: For The Love Of Progress =

2023 Progress Wrestling event

- Promotional poster of the event
- Promotion: Progress Wrestling
- Date: 28 April 2023
- City: Manchester, England
- Venue: Bowlers BEC Arena

Event chronology
← Previous; Chapter 151: Heavy Metal	Next → Chapter 153: Super Strong Style 16

The Progress Chapter 152: For The Love Of Progress was a professional wrestling event produced by Progress Wrestling. It took place on 28 April 2023, in Manchester, England at Bowlers BEC Arena.

Nine matches were contested at the event. In the main event, Dominatus Regnum (Bullit, Charlie Sterling, Nick Riley and Spike Trivet) defeated SAnitY (Axel Tischer and Big Damo) and Sunshine Machine (Chuck Mambo and TK Cooper).

== Production ==
=== Storylines ===
The event included matches that each resulted from scripted storylines, where wrestlers portrayed heroes, villains, or less distinguishable characters in scripted events that built tension and culminated in a wrestling match or series of matches. Results were predetermined by Progress' creative writers, while storylines were produced on Progress' events airing on the Demand PROGRESS streaming service.

=== Event ===
The event started with the singles confrontation between Brady Phillips and Rob Drake, solded with the victory of the latter. The show continued with a series of several other singles bouts, one in which Luke Jacobs picked up a victory over JJ Webb. Next up, Raven Creed defeated Dani Luna. In the fourth bout, Dan Moloney outmatched Robbie X. Next up, Rhio picked up a victory over Skye Smitson. In the sixth bout, Millie McKenzie defeated LA Taylor. The seventh bout saw Tate Mayfairs picking up a victory over Gene Munny. In the semi main event, Ricky Knight Jr. defeated Man Like DeReiss to secure the second consecutive defense of the Progress Atlas Championship in that respective reign.

In the main event, Bullit, Charlie Sterling, Nick Riley and Spike Trivet defeated Axel Tischer, Big Damo, Chuck Mambo and TK Cooper in eight-man tag team competition.

== Results ==
No.	Results	Stipulations
1	Rob Drake defeated Brady Phillips by pinfall	Singles match
2	Luke Jacobs defeated JJ Webb by pinfall	Singles match
3	Raven Creed defeated Dani Luna by pinfall	Singles match
4	Dan Moloney defeated Robbie X by pinfall	Singles match
5	Rhio defeated Skye Smitson (with Lana Austin and LA Taylor) by pinfall	Singles match
6	Millie McKenzie defeated LA Taylor (with Lana Austin and Skye Smitson) by pinfall	Singles match
7	Tate Mayfairs defeated Gene Munny by pinfall	Singles match
8	Ricky Knight Jr. (c) defeated Man Like DeReiss by pinfall	Singles match for the Progress Atlas Championship
9	Dominatus Regnum (Bullit, Charlie Sterling, Nick Riley and Spike Trivet) defeated SAnitY (Axel Tischer and Big Damo) and Sunshine Machine (Chuck Mambo and TK Cooper) by pinfall	Eight-man tag team match
(c) / – the champion(s) heading into the match
