= Progress Chapter 158: The Long Halloween =

2023 Progress Wrestling event

- Promotional poster of the event
- Promotion: Progress Wrestling
- Date: 22 October (Aired 27 October 2023)
- City: London, England
- Venue: Electric Ballroom

Event chronology
← Previous; Chapter 157: Hungry Like The Wolf	Next → Chapter 159: Wonderbrawl

The Chapter 158: The Long Halloween was a professional wrestling event produced by Progress Wrestling. It took place on 22 October 2023, in London, England at Electric Ballroom.

Nine matches were contested at the event. In the main event, Lykos Gym (Kid Lykos and Kid Lykos II) defeated Smokin' Aces (Charlie Sterling and Nick Riley). In other prominent matches, Rhio defeated Lana Austin to win the Progress World Women's Championship, who had just defeated Alexxis Falcon to retain the title.

== Production ==
=== Storylines ===
The event included matches that each resulted from scripted storylines, where wrestlers portrayed heroes, villains, or less distinguishable characters in scripted events that built tension and culminated in a wrestling match or series of matches. Results were predetermined by Progress' creative writers, while storylines were produced on Progress' events airing on the Demand PROGRESS streaming service.

=== Event ===
The event started with the singles confrontation between Yoshiki Inamura and Tate Mayfairs, solded with the victory of the latter. Next up, Big Damo and Axel Tischer picked up a victory over Malik and Paul Robinson in tag team competition. The third bout saw Nina Samuels defeat Aleah James in singles competition. Next up, Gene Munny outmatched Nathan Cruz in another singles bout. In the fifth match, KC Navarro defeated Brent Banks, Jack Bandicoot and Vaughn Vertigo to retain the Warrior Wrestling Championship. Next up, Luke Jacobs defeated Warren Banks in singles competition. The seventh match saw Lana Austin defeat Alexxis Falcon to secure the seventh consecutive defense of the Progress World Women's Championship in that respective reign. Austin then got challenged by Rhio who defeated her in a twenty-second squash match to win the Women's title, ending Austin's reign at 329 days and seven defenses.

In the main event, Kid Lykos and Kid Lykos II defeated Progress Tag Team Champions Charlie Sterling and Nick Riley in a non-title match.

== Results ==
No.	Results	Stipulations	Times
1	Tate Mayfairs defeated Yoshiki Inamura by pinfall	Singles match	11:08
2	Sanity (Big Damo and Axel Tischer) defeated Malik and Paul Robinson by pinfall	Tag team match	7:37
3	Nina Samuels defeated Aleah James by pinfall	Singles match	9:56
4	Gene Munny defeated Nathan Cruz by pinfall	Singles match	14:11
5	KC Navarro (c) defeated Brent Banks, Jack Bandicoot and Vaughn Vertigo by pinfall	Four-way match for the Warrior Wrestling Championship	14:14
6	Luke Jacobs defeated Warren Banks by pinfall	Singles match	9:51
7	Lana Austin (c) defeated Alexxis Falcon by pinfall	Singles match for the Progress World Women's Championship	15:44
8	Rhio defeated Lana Austin (c) by pinfall	Singles match for the Progress World Women's Championship	0:20
9	Lykos Gym (Kid Lykos and Kid Lykos II) defeated Smokin' Aces (Charlie Sterling and Nick Riley) by pinfall	Tag team match	29:29
(c) / – the champion(s) heading into the match
