= Progress Chapter 164: For The Love Of Progress 2 =

2024 Progress Wrestling event

- Promotional poster of the event
- Promotion: Progress Wrestling
- Date: 1 March 2024
- City: Manchester, England
- Venue: Bowlers BEC Arena

Event chronology
← Previous; Chapter 163: Twisted Metal	Next → Chapter 165: Diamond Dust

The Progress Chapter 164: For The Love Of Progress 2 was a professional wrestling event produced by Progress Wrestling. It took place on 1 March 2024, in Manchester, England at Bowlers BEC Arena.

Eight matches were contested at the event. The main event saw Rhio defeat Debbie Keitel to retain the Progress World Women's Championship.

== Production ==
=== Storylines ===
The event included matches that each resulted from scripted storylines, where wrestlers portrayed heroes, villains, or less distinguishable characters in scripted events that built tension and culminated in a wrestling match or series of matches. Results were predetermined by Progress' creative writers, while storylines were produced on Progress' events airing on the Demand PROGRESS streaming service.

=== Event ===
The event started with the singles confrontation between Big Damo and Eddie Dennis, solded with the victory of the latter. Next up, Tate Mayfairs picked up a victory over Taishi Ozawa in singles competition. The third bout saw Luke Jacobs defeat Myles Kayman in another singles confrontation. In the fourth match, Kid Lykos and Kid Lykos II outmatched James Drake and Zack Gibson in tag team competition. Next up, Ricky Knight Jr. defeated Major League Wrestling's Alex Hammerstone to secure the eighth consecutive defense of the Progress Atlas Championship in that respective reign. In the sixth bout, Connor Mills picked up a victory over Simon Miller. In the semi main event, Lana Austin and Rob Drake defeated Gene Munny and Harley Hudson in an intergender tag team bout.

In the main event, Rhio defeated Debbie Keitel to secure the seventh consecutive defense of the Progress World Women's Championship in that respective reign.

== Results ==
No.	Results	Stipulations
1	Eddie Dennis defeated Big Damo by pinfall	Singles match
2	Tate Mayfairs defeated Taishi Ozawa by pinfall	Singles match
3	Luke Jacobs defeated Myles Kayman by pinfall	Singles match
4	Lykos Gym (Kid Lykos and Kid Lykos II) defeated Grizzled Young Veterans (James Drake and Zack Gibson) by pinfall	Tag team match
5	Ricky Knight Jr. (c) defeated Alex Hammerstone by pinfall	Singles match for the Progress Atlas Championship
6	Connor Mills defeated Simon Miller by pinfall	Singles match
7	Lana Austin and Rob Drake defeated Gene Munny and Harley Hudson by pinfall	Tag team match
8	Rhio (c) defeated Debbie Keitel by pinfall	Singles match for the Progress World Women's Championship
(c) / – the champion(s) heading into the match
