= Progress Chapter 159: Wonderbrawl =

2023 Progress Wrestling event

- Promotional poster of the event
- Promotion: Progress Wrestling
- Date: 12 November (Aired 17 November 2023)
- City: Manchester, England
- Venue: O2 Ritz

Event chronology
← Previous; Chapter 158: The Long Halloween	Next → Chapter 160: Vendetta

The Chapter 159: Wonderbrawl was a professional wrestling event produced by Progress Wrestling. It took place on 12 November 2023, in Manchester, England at O2 Ritz.

Eight matches were contested at the event. In the main event, Rhio defeated Lana Austin to retain the Progress World Women's Championship.

== Production ==
=== Storylines ===
The event included matches that each resulted from scripted storylines, where wrestlers portrayed heroes, villains, or less distinguishable characters in scripted events that built tension and culminated in a wrestling match or series of matches. Results were predetermined by Progress' creative writers, while storylines were produced on Progress' events airing on the Demand PROGRESS streaming service.

=== Event ===
Thre event started with two number one contendership bouts for distinctive titles. In the first one, Luke Jacobs defeated Yoshiki Inamura to furtherly pursue for the Progress Atlas Championship, and in the second one, Kanji and Lizzy Evo wrestled into a draw while battling for the contendership of the Progress World Women's Championship. The third bout saw Robbie X picking up a victory over Jack Bandicoot in singles competition. Next up, Charles Crowley outmatchee Matthew Rehwoldt in another singles bout. In the fifth match, Leon Slater defeated Francesco Akira. The sixth bout saw Bullit, Charlie Sterling and Spike Trivet outmatching Kid Lykos, Kid Lykos II and Warren Banks in six-man tag team competition. In the semi main event, Ricky Knight Jr. defeated Shigehiro Irie to secure the fifth consecutive defense of the Progress Atlas Championship in that respective reign.

In the Rhio defeated Lana Austin to secure the first successful defense of the Progress World Women's Championship in that respective reign.

== Results ==
No.	Results	Stipulations	Times
1	Luke Jacobs defeated Yoshiki Inamura by pinfall	Singles match to determine the #1 contendership for the Progress Atlas Championship	13:18
2	Kanji vs. Lizzy Evo ended in a draw	Singles match to determine the #1 contendership for the Progress World Women's Championship	15:10
3	Robbie X defeated Jack Bandicoot by pinfall	Singles match	10:01
4	Charles Crowley defeated Matthew Rehwoldt by pinfall	Singles match	12:12
5	Leon Slater defeated Francesco Akira by pinfall	Singles match	9:22
6	Dominatus Regnum (Bullit, Charlie Sterling and Spike Trivet) defeated Lykos Gym (Kid Lykos and Kid Lykos II) and Warren Banks by pinfall	Six-man tag team match	21:14
7	Ricky Knight Jr. (c) defeated Shigehiro Irie by pinfall	Singles match for the Progress Atlas Championship	15:40
8	Rhio (c) defeated Lana Austin by pinfall	Singles match for the Progress World Women's Championship	13:17
(c) / – the champion(s) heading into the match
