= Progress Chapter 162: The Light Of The Dragon =

2024 Progress Wrestling event

- Promotional poster of the event
- Promotion: Progress Wrestling
- Date: 28 January 2024 (Aired 2 February 2024)
- City: London, England
- Venue: Electric Ballroom
- Attendance: cca. 700

Event chronology
← Previous; Chapter 161: Unboxing VI And A Movie	Next → Chapter 163: Twisted Metal

The Progress Chapter 162: The Light Of The Dragon was a professional wrestling event produced by Progress Wrestling. It took place on 28 January 2024, in London, England at Electric Ballroom.

== Production ==
=== Storylines ===
The event included matches that each resulted from scripted storylines, where wrestlers portrayed heroes, villains, or less distinguishable characters in scripted events that built tension and culminated in a wrestling match or series of matches. Results were predetermined by Progress' creative writers, while storylines were produced on Progress' events airing on the Demand PROGRESS streaming service.

=== Event ===
The event started with sht singles confrontation between Leon Slater and Mustafa Ali, solded with the victory of the latter. Next up, Kanji defeated Nina Samuels in another singles competition bout. The third match saw Malik and Paul Robinson picking up a victory over Bonesaw and Damien Corvin. Next up, Rob Drake outmatched Taishi Ozawa in singles competition. In the fifth bout, Sunshine Machine (Chuck Mambo and TK Cooper) defeated James Drake and Zack Gibson in tag team competition. Next up, Bullit picked up a victory over Shigehiro Irie in singles competition. In the semi main event, Rhio defeated Harley Hudson to secure the fourth consecutive defense of the Progress World Women's Championship in that respective reign.

In the main event, Kid Lykos defeated Connor Mills, Gene Munny, Luke Jacobs, Mark Haskins, Tate Mayfairs and Yoichi in a Thunderbastard match to become the number one contender for the PROGRESS World Championship. He furtherly defeated Spike Trivet one month later at Progress Chapter 163: Twisted Metal on 25 February 2024 to win the title.

== Results ==
No.	Results	Stipulations	Times
1	Mustafa Ali defeated Leon Slater by pinfall	Singles match	10:30
2	Kanji defeated Nina Samuels by pinfall	Singles match	11:24
3	Malik and Paul Robinson defeated Kings Of The North (Bonesaw and Damien Corvin) by pinfall	Tag team match	9:33
4	Rob Drake defeated Taishi Ozawa by pinfall	Singles match	7:13
5	Sunshine Machine (Chuck Mambo and TK Cooper) defeated Grizzled Young Veterans (James Drake and Zack Gibson) by pinfall	Tag team match	16:57
6	Bullit defeated Shigehiro Irie by pinfall	Singles match	8:52
7	Rhio (c) defeated Harley Hudson by pinfall	Singles match for the Progress World Women's Championship	10:03
8	Kid Lykos defeated Connor Mills, Gene Munny, Luke Jacobs, Mark Haskins, Tate Mayfairs and Yoichi by pinfall	Thunderbastard match to determine the #1 contender to the PROGRESS World Championship	25:01
(c) / – the champion(s) heading into the match
