= Progress Chapter 176: For The Love of Progress 3 =

2025 Progress Wrestling event

Chapter 176: For The Love of Progress 3
- Promotional poster of the event
- Promotion: Progress Wrestling
- Date: 14 February 2025
- City: Manchester, England
- Venue: Bowlers BEC Arena

Event chronology
← Previous; Chapter 175: Unboxing VII: The Curtain Call	Next → Chapter 177: My Own Destiny

The Chapter 176: For The Love of Progress 3 was a professional wrestling event produced by Progress Wrestling. It took place on 14 February 2025, in Manchester, England, at the Bowlers BEC Arena.

Seven matches were contested at the event. The main event saw Simon Miller defeat Charles Crowley to retain the Progress Proteus Championship.

== Production ==
=== Storylines ===
The event included matches that each resulted from scripted storylines, where wrestlers portrayed heroes, villains, or less distinguishable characters in scripted events that built tension and culminated in a wrestling match or series of matches. Results were predetermined by Progress' creative writers, while storylines were produced on Progress' events airing on the Demand PROGRESS streaming service.

=== Event ===
The event started with the tag team confrontation between Flash Morgan Webster and Mark Andrews, and Ethan Allen and Luke Jacobs, solded with the victory of the latter team. Next up, Lana Austin defeated Hollie Barlow in singles competition. The third match saw Connor Mills and Nico Angelo fighting Kid Lykos and Kid Lykos II into a no-contest. Next up, Nina Samuels defeated Emersyn Jayne to secure the first defense of the Progress World Women's Championship in that respective reign. In the fifth bout, Tate Mayfairs defeated 1 Called Manders in singles competition. In the semi main event, Man Like DeReiss picked up a victory over Richard Holliday in another singles bout.

In the main event, Simon Miller defeated Charles Crowley to secure the fourth consecutive defense of the Progress Proteus Championship in that respective reign.

== Results ==
No.	Results	Stipulations	Times
1	Young Guns (Luke Jacobs and Ethan Allen) defeated Subculture (Flash Morgan Webster and Mark Andrews) by pinfall	Tag team match	12:07
2	Lana Austin defeated Hollie Barlow by pinfall	Singles match	6:53
3	Connor Mills and Nico Angelo vs. Lykos Gym (Kid Lykos and Kid Lykos II) ended in a no contest	Tornado tag team match	8:52
4	Nina Samuels (c) defeated Emersyn Jayne by pinfall	Singles match for the Progress World Women's Championship	13:50
5	Tate Mayfairs defeated 1 Called Manders by submission	Singles match	10:07
6	Man Like DeReiss defeated Richard Holliday by pinfall	Singles match	8:53
7	Simon Miller (c) defeated Charles Crowley by pinfall	Singles match for the Progress Proteus Championship	11:01
(c) / – the champion(s) heading into the match
