= Progress Chapter 181: Far From Ordinary People =

2025 Progress Wrestling event

Chapter 181: Far From Ordinary People
- Promotional poster of the event
- Promotion: Progress Wrestling
- Date: 29 June 2025
- City: Manchester, England
- Venue: The O_{2} Ritz
- Attendance: cca. 400

Event chronology
← Previous; Super Strong Style 16	Next → Chapter 182: Stay Humble

The Chapter 181: Far From Ordinary People was a professional wrestling event produced by Progress Wrestling. It took place on 29 June 2025 in Manchester, England, at The O_{2} Ritz.

Eight matches were contested at the event. The main event saw Luke Jacobs defeat Cara Noir to retain the PROGRESS World Championship.

== Production ==
=== Storylines ===
The event included matches that each resulted from scripted storylines, where wrestlers portrayed heroes, villains, or less distinguishable characters in scripted events that built tension and culminated in a wrestling match or series of matches. Results were predetermined by Progress' creative writers, while storylines were produced on Progress' events airing on the Demand PROGRESS streaming service.

=== Event ===
The event started with the singles confrontation between Ethan Allen and Man Like DeReiss, solded with the victory of the latter. Next up, Kanji picked up a victory over Lana Austin in another singles bout. The third match saw Kid Lykos and Kid Lykos II defeat Sunshine Machine (Chuck Mambo and TK Cooper) to win the PROGRESS Tag Team Championship, ending the latter teams' reign at 91 days and no defenses. Next up, Nina Samuels defeated Shotzi Blackheart in singles competition. The fifth bout saw Charles Crowley outmatch Jack Morris, Simon Miller and Adam Maxted in four-way action. Next up, Charlie Sterling defeated RPD in singles competition. In the semi main event, Alexxis Falcon picked up a victory over Hollie Barlow.

In the main event, Luke Jacobs defeated Cara Noir to secure the thirteenth consecutive defense of the PROGRESS World Championship in that respective reign.

== Results ==
No.	Results	Stipulations	Times
1	Man Like DeReiss defeated Ethan Allen by pinfall	Singles match	8:50
2	Kanji defeated Lana Austin by submission	Pick Your Poison match (Note: Nina Samuels selected Kanji's opponent.)	13:11
3	Lykos Gym (Kid Lykos and Kid Lykos II) defeated Sunshine Machine (Chuck Mambo and TK Cooper) (c) by pinfall	Tag team match for the PROGRESS Tag Team Championship	13:15
4	Nina Samuels defeated Shotzi Blackheart by pinfall	Pick Your Poison match (Note: Kanji selected Nina's opponent.)	10:42
5	Charles Crowley defeated Jack Morris, Simon Miller and Adam Maxted by pinfall	Four-way match	6:12
6	Charlie Sterling defeated RPD by pinfall	Singles match	9:04
7	Alexxis Falcon defeated Hollie Barlow by pinfall	Singles match	2:45
8	Luke Jacobs (c) defeated Cara Noir by pinfall	Singles match for the PROGRESS World Championship	21:35
(c) / – the champion(s) heading into the match
