= Progress Chapter 165: Diamond Dust =

2024 Progress Wrestling event

- Promotional poster of the event
- Promotion: Progress Wrestling
- Date: 7 March 2024
- City: London, England
- Venue: The Dome

Event chronology
← Previous; Chapter 164: For The Love Of Progress 2	Next → Chapter 166: Freedom Walks Again

The Progress Chapter 165: Diamond Dust was a professional wrestling event produced by Progress Wrestling. It took place on 7 March 2024, in London, England at The Dome.

Eight matches were contested at the event. The main event saw Kid Lykos defeat Lio Rush to retain the PROGRESS World Championship.

== Production ==
=== Storylines ===
The event included matches that each resulted from scripted storylines, where wrestlers portrayed heroes, villains, or less distinguishable characters in scripted events that built tension and culminated in a wrestling match or series of matches. Results were predetermined by Progress' creative writers, while storylines were produced on Progress' events airing on the Demand PROGRESS streaming service.

=== Event ===
The event started with the tag team confrontation between Dominatus Regnum (Bullit and Nick Riley) and Cheeky Little Buggers (Alexxis Falcon and Charles Crowley), solded with the victory of the latter team who secured the first and only successful defense of the PROGRESS Tag Team Championship in that respective reign. In the second bout, Pro-Wrestling: EVE's Nina Samuels defeated Emersyn Jayne in singles competition. Next up, Pro Wrestling Noah's GHC Heavyweight Champion El Hijo de Dr. Wagner Jr. defeated Kid Lykos II in a non-title bout. The third match saw Masato Tanaka picking up a victory over Luke Jacobs in singles action. The fourth bout saw Connor Mills outmatching Noah rookie in excursion Taishi Ozawa. Next up, Sunshine Machine (Chuck Mambo and TK Cooper) defeated Kieron Lacey and Mark Trew in tag team competition. In the semi main event, TNT Extreme Wrestling's Tate Mayfairs defeated Galeno del Mal.

The main event saw Kid Lykos defeating Lio Rush to secure the first successful defense of the PROGRESS World Championship in that respective reign.

== Results ==
No.	Results	Stipulations	Times
1	Cheeky Little Buggers (Alexxis Falcon and Charles Crowley) (c) defeated Dominatus Regnum (Bullit and Nick Riley) by pinfall	Tag team match for the PROGRESS Tag Team Championship	10:41
2	Nina Samuels defeated Emersyn Jayne by pinfall	Singles match	9:58
3	El Hijo de Dr. Wagner Jr. defeated Kid Lykos II by pinfall	Singles match	9:36
4	Masato Tanaka defeated Luke Jacobs by pinfall	Extreme Rules match	10:22
5	Connor Mills defeated Taishi Ozawa by pinfall	Singles match	8:05
6	Sunshine Machine (Chuck Mambo and TK Cooper) defeated Kieron Lacey and Mark Trew by pinfall	Tag team match	9:31
7	Tate Mayfairs defeated Galeno del Mal by pinfall	Singles match	10:40
8	Kid Lykos (c) defeated Lio Rush by pinfall	Singles match for the PROGRESS World Championship	17:51
(c) / – the champion(s) heading into the match
