= Progress Chapter 196: Scorchio =

2026 Progress Wrestling event

Chapter 196: Scorchio
- Promotional poster of the event
- Promotion: Progress Wrestling
- Date: 26 July 2026
- City: London, England
- Venue: Electric Ballroom
- Attendance: ca. 700

Event chronology
← Previous; Chapter 195: Wonderbrawl II	Next → Chapter 197: Wrestling Over Everything

The Chapter 196: Scorchio was a professional wrestling event produced by Progress Wrestling. It took place on 26 July 2026, in London, England, at the Electric Ballroom.

Eight matches were contested at the event. In the main event, Cara Noir defeated Charles Crowley to retain the PROGRESS World Championship. In another prominent match, Rhio defeated Alexxis Falcon to win the Progress World Women's Championship.

== Production ==
=== Storylines ===
The event included matches that each resulted from scripted storylines, where wrestlers portrayed heroes, villains, or less distinguishable characters in scripted events that built tension and culminated in a wrestling match or series of matches. Results were predetermined by Progress' creative writers, while storylines were produced on Progress' events airing on the Demand PROGRESS streaming service.

=== Event ===
The event started with four singles bouts. In the first one, Nikki Storm picked up a victory over Session Moth Martina, in the second one, Simon Miller outmatched Scott Oberman, in the third one, Kouga defeated Joe Coffey, and in the fourth, Spike Trivet toppled Bullit. The fifth match saw Danny Black and Joe Lando defeat Jude London and Paris De Silva in tag team competition. Next up, Gene Munny wrestled Tommy Tanner into a no contest, thus securing the fourth consecutive defense of the Progress Atlas Championship in that respective reign. In the semi main event, Rhio defeated Alexxis Falcon to win the Progress World Women's Championship for a record third time at the moment of the event, ending Falcon's reign at 182 days and three defenses.

In the main event, Cara Noir defeated 2026 Super Strong Style 16 winner Charles Crowley to secure the first successful defense of the PROGRESS World Championship in that respective reign.

== Results ==
No.	Results	Stipulations	Times
1	Nikki Storm defeated Session Moth Martina by pinfall	Singles match	—
2	Simon Miller defeated Scott Oberman by pinfall	Singles match	—
3	Kouga defeated Joe Coffey by pinfall	Singles match	—
4	Spike Trivet defeated Bullit by pinfall	Singles match	—
5	CPF (Danny Black and Joe Lando) defeated The VeloCities (Jude London and Paris De Silva) by pinfall	Tag team match	—
6	Gene Munny (c) (with Session Moth Martina) vs. Tommy Tanner ended in a no contest	Singles match for the Progress Atlas Championship	—
7	Rhio defeated Alexxis Falcon (c) by pinfall	Singles match for the Progress World Women's Championship	—
8	Cara Noir (c) defeated Charles Crowley by pinfall	Singles match for the PROGRESS World Championship	19:59
(c) / – the champion(s) heading into the match
