= Alexander Wolfe (wrestler) =

German wrestler (born 1986)

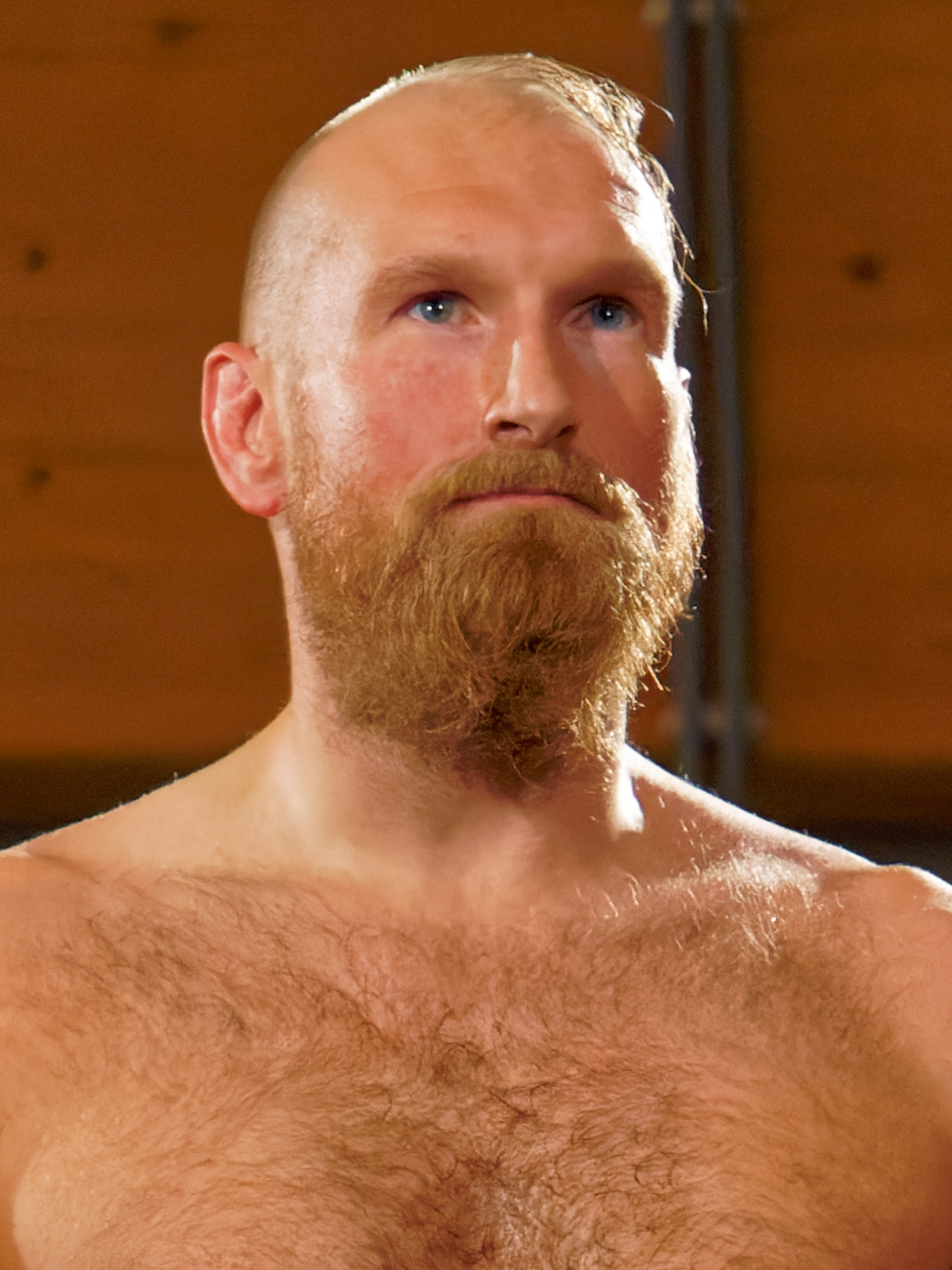
- Tischer in 2022

Personal information
- Born: Axel Tischer; 5 November 1986 (age 40) Dresden, Bezirk Dresden, East Germany

Professional wrestling career
- Ring name(s): Alexander Wolfe; Axel Tischer
- Billed height: 6 ft 1 in (1.85 m)
- Billed weight: 245 lb (111 kg)
- Billed from: Dresden, Germany
- Debut: 2001

Axel Tischer (born 5 November 1986) is a German professional wrestler currently performing for German Wrestling Federation (GWF) and Westside Xtreme Wrestling (wXw), where is current wXw Shotgun Champion in his third reign. He is also makes appearances on the independent circuit. He is best known for his tenure in WWE, where he performed under the ring name, Alexander Wolfe.

Under his real name, Tischer competed on the European independent circuit. During this period, he is best known in Westside Xtreme Wrestling, where he is a two-time Unified World Wrestling Champion and two-time Shotgun Champion. He is also the former GWF World Champion in his first time. He then debuted in WWE's NXT brand as part of the stable Sanity, where he and Eric Young won the NXT Tag Team Championship in 2017. After moving to the SmackDown brand in 2018, the group saw little success, resulting in their disbandment in early 2019. He subsequently began wrestling in the NXT and NXT UK brands as part of the Imperium stable until his WWE departure in 2021.

== Professional wrestling career ==
=== Independent circuit (2001–2015) ===
Tischer began training to be a professional wrestler at age 13 in his home town of Dresden. Tischer wrestled extensively on the independent circuit throughout Germany and Europe, appearing for numerous promotions including German Stampede Wrestling, the German Wrestling Federation and Westside Xtreme Wrestling. In 2012 he defeated El Generico to win the wXw Unified World Wrestling Championship and held the championship for almost a year before losing it to Tommy End.

=== WWE (2015–2021) ===
==== Sanity (2015–2019) ====
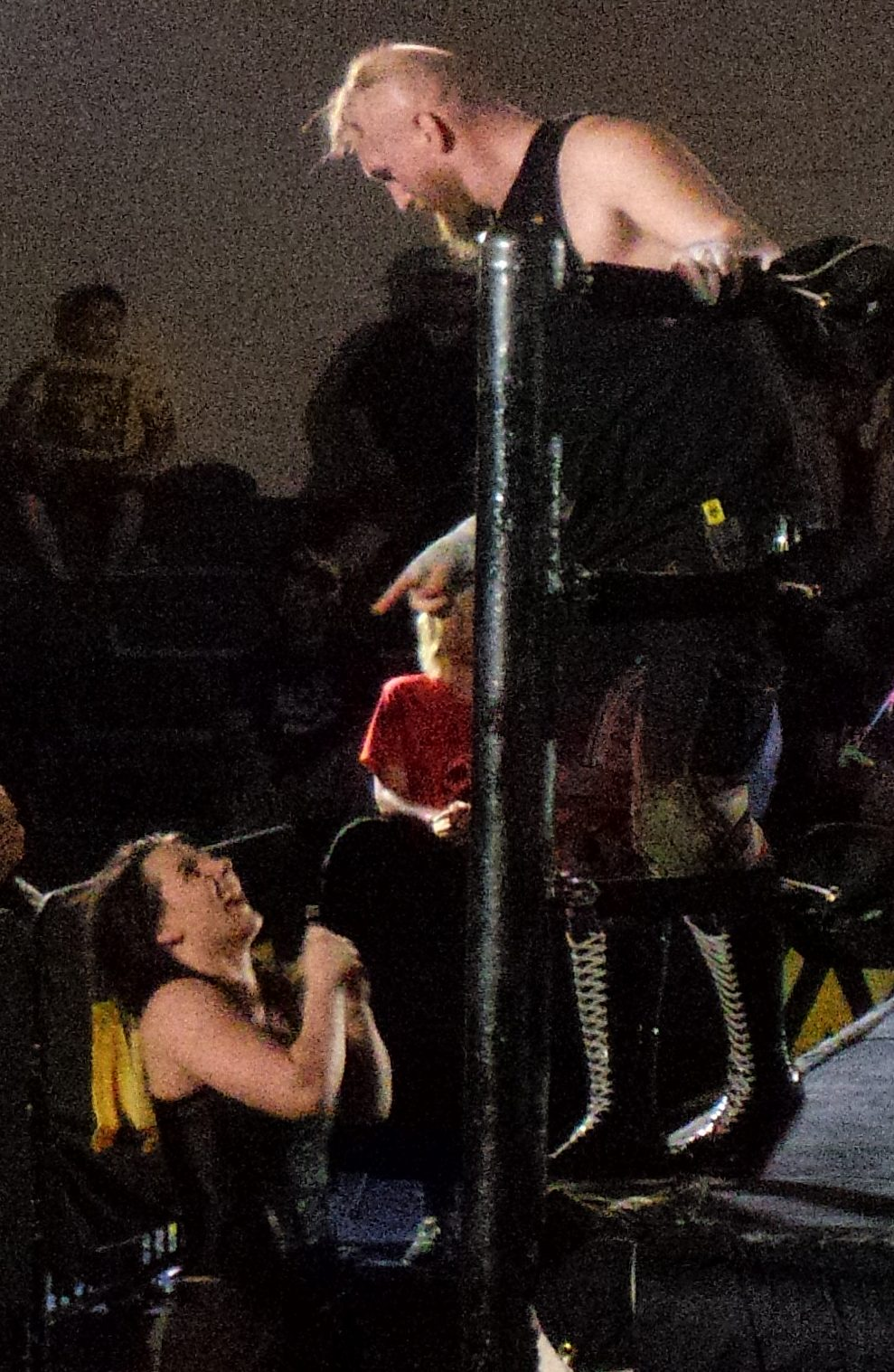
Wolfe (right) with fellow Sanity member Nikki Cross

In April 2015, Tischer began training at the WWE Performance Center as part of a class of 10 international WWE recruits. He made his television debut on 15 July 2015 episode of NXT, losing to Samoa Joe. In August, Tischer adopted the ring name Alexander Wolfe.

In 2016, Wolfe formed a tag-team with Sawyer Fulton at NXT live events. In September, Wolfe and Sawyer joined a stable called Sanity, which also included Eric Young and Nikki Cross. The stable made its debut on the 12 October episode of NXT, with Wolfe and Fulton defeating the team of Bobby Roode and Tye Dillinger as part of the Dusty Rhodes Tag Team Classic. On the 2 November episode of NXT, in the second round of the tournament, Wolfe and Fulton defeated the team of T. J. Perkins and Kota Ibushi. Wolfe and Fulton lost to TM-61 in the semi-finals of the tournament. On 19 August 2017, at NXT TakeOver: Brooklyn III, Wolfe and Eric Young defeated The Authors of Pain to win the NXT Tag Team Championship, becoming the first German to hold a championship in WWE. Young and Killian Dain lost the Tag Team Championship to The Undisputed Era (Bobby Fish and Kyle O'Reilly) on the 20 December episode of NXT.

During the 2018 WWE Superstar Shake-up, SAnitY (excluding Cross) were drafted to SmackDown. The group debuted on the 19 June episode of SmackDown LIVE where they attacked The Usos. The following week, SAnitY lost to The Usos and Jeff Hardy. On the 3 July episode of SmackDown LIVE, the group attacked The New Day. This led to a tables match between the two teams at Extreme Rules, which SAnitY won. On the 24 July episode of SmackDown LIVE, SAnitY and The New Day faced off in the first round of the WWE SmackDown Tag Team Championship No. 1 Contender's tournament. SAnitY (represented by Wolfe and Dain) were defeated.

The group competed in only two more televised matches throughout the remainder of 2018, while primarily competing at live events. After a near four-month hiatus from television, SAnitY returned on the 2 April 2019 episode of SmackDown LIVE, losing a three-on-one Falls Count Anywhere match to The Miz. During the 2019 WWE Superstar Shake-up, Young was drafted to Raw.

==== Imperium (2019–2021) ====
Following the disbanding of Sanity, Wolfe made his debut appearance for the NXT UK brand on the 12 June episode of NXT UK, joining the brand and aligning himself with Imperium alongside Walter, Fabian Aichner, and Marcel Barthel. On 3 the July episode of NXT UK, Wolfe made his in-ring debut for the brand, defeating Jack Starz. Wolfe, along with Imperium, appeared on the 11 November episode of Raw, accompanying and interfering during Walter's match against the WWE Universal Champion Seth Rollins, until Kevin Owens and The Street Profits made the save, this led to an eight-man tag team match, were Imperium were defeated after Rollins pinned Wolfe.

Through the end of the year, Imperium started a feud against Ilja Dragunov in NXT UK and with The Undisputed Era on NXT, and on the 12 November episode of NXT UK, Wolfe defeated Dragunov, however three weeks later, Dragunov defeated Wolfe in a no disqualification match. At Worlds Collide, Imperium faced The Undisputed Era, where Wolfe suffered an injury during the match and had to be taken to backstage, however Imperium ultimately won the match. On the 18 May 2021 episode of NXT, after Wolfe was defeated by Killian Dain, he was attacked by Aichner and Barthel, thus kicking him out of the faction. This was done to write him off television as Tischer's WWE contract was due to expire the following June; he was subsequently among the group of NXT talent released from their contracts the following day.

=== Return to the Independent circuit (2019–present) ===
Due to a cooperation between WWE and wXw, Tischer was able to wrestle a total of five matches for the wXw between 2019 and 2020 under his WWE name "Alexander Wolfe", and on 8 March 2020, he won a triple threat match against The Avalanche and Ilja Dragunov to win the wXw Shotgun Championship. Due to the travel restrictions, the title was vacated on 17 May.

After his release from the WWE, Tischer returned to Germany with his family and has since lived in his hometown of Dresden. As a result, he also made his comeback under his real name at wXw and on 7 August at wXw 20th Anniversary, Tischer defeated Fast Time Moodo. On 23 October, at wXw True Colors, Tischer defeated Marius Al-Ani to win the wXw Unified World Wrestling Championship for the second time.

At GWF Pick Your Poison on 18 August 2021, Axel Tischer returned to his home promotion German Wrestling Federation for the first time since signing with WWE. He confronted GWF World Champion John Klinger and entered himself into the GWF Battlefield 2021. On 19 September 2021, Axel Tischer competed in a GWF ring for the first time since February 2015 and ultimately won the Royal Rumble-style match to gain an opportunity to challenge John Klinger for the GWF World Title. At GWF Legacy: 25 Years of Berlin Wrestling on 14 November 2021, Tischer defeated Klinger and won the GWF World Title for the first time.

On 27 November 2022, Tischer re-united with former SAnitY tag team partner Killian Dain (who was wrestling under the name "Big Damo") at Progress Wrestling's Chapter 146 - They Think It's All Over, at the Electric Ballroom, Camden Town, London, England, where they defeated the team of Luke Jacobs and Leon Slater.

== Personal life ==
Tischer has a son.

== Other media ==
Wolfe made his WWE video game debut as a playable character in WWE 2K18 and is also playable in WWE 2K19 and WWE 2K22.

== Championship and accomplishments ==
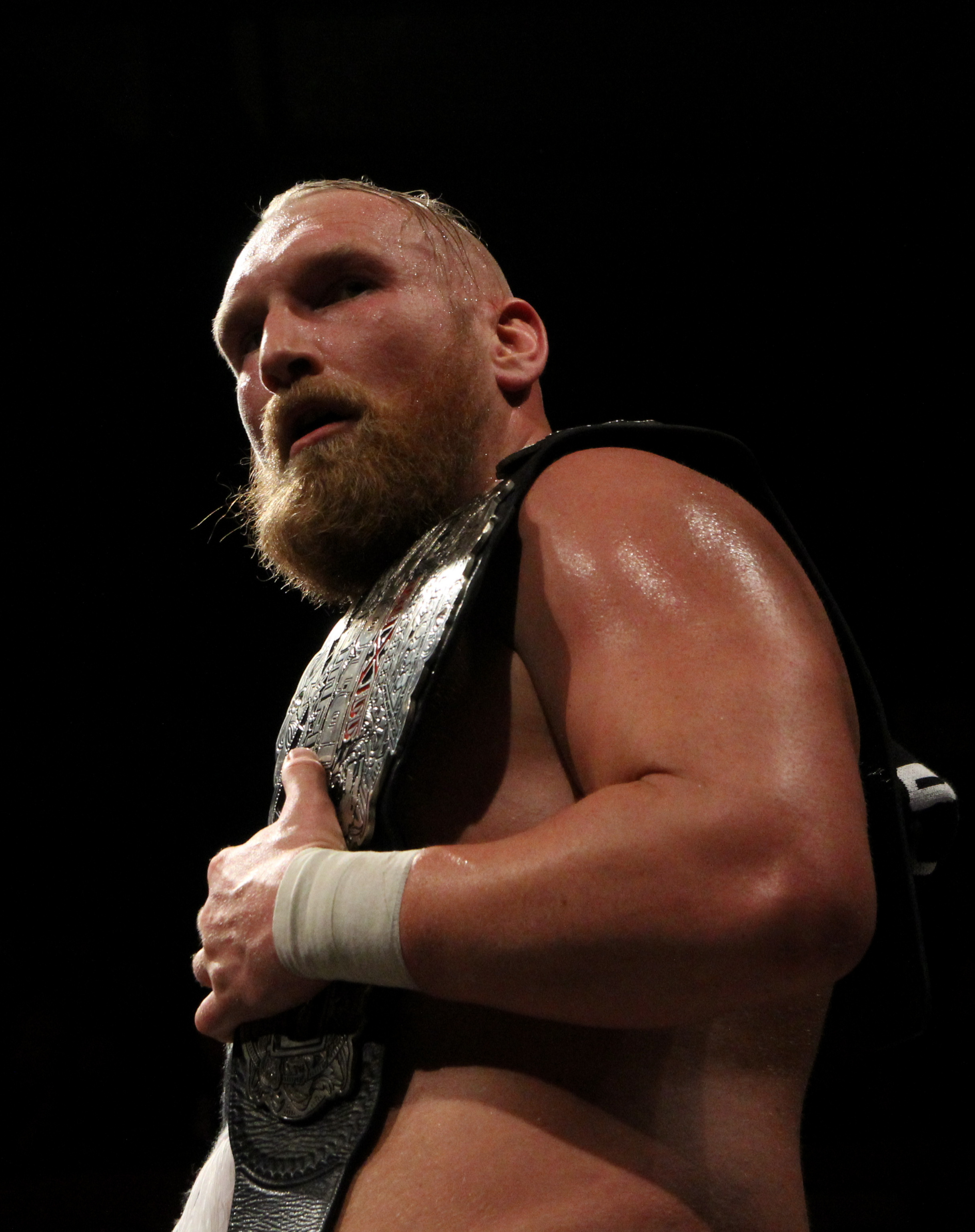
In Westside Xtreme Wrestling, Tischer is a three-time WXW Shotgun Champion.

- BODYSLAM Pro Wrestling
  - BODYSLAM Tag Team Championship (1 time) – with Big Damo
- Catch As Catch Can
  - CACC Supreme Championship (1 time)
- Catch Factory
  - Catch Factory Championship (1 time)
  - Catch Factory Tag Team Championship (1 time) – with Fast Time Moodo
- Power of Wrestling
  - POW Catch Welt Cup (2024)
- East Side Wrestling
  - ESW Deutsche Meisterschaft Championship (1 time)
- German Stampede Wrestling
  - GSW Breakthrough Championship (1 time)
  - GSW Tag Team Championship (1 time) – with Ivan Kiev
- German Wrestling Federation
  - GWF World Championship (2 times)
  - GWF Berlin Championship (1 time)
  - GWF Tag Team Championship (1 time) – with Metehan
  - World Cup (2025)
  - GWF Battlefield (2021)
- Insane Championship Wrestling
  - ICW Tag Team Championship (1 time) – with Big Damo
- Progress Wrestling
  - Progress Atlas Championship (1 time)
  - PROGRESS Tag Team Championship (1 time) – with Big Damo
- Pro Wrestling Illustrated
  - Ranked No. 87 of the top 500 singles wrestlers in the PWI 500 in 2022
- Pro Wrestling Österreich
  - PWÖ Tag Team Championship (1 time) – with Big Damo
- Westside Xtreme Wrestling
  - wXw Shotgun Championship (3 times)
  - wXw Unified World Wrestling Championship (2 times)
  - wXw World Tag Team Championship (1 time) – with Fast Time Moodo
  - wXw Catch Grand Prix (2021)
  - AMBITION (2012, 2024)
- WrestlingKULT
  - King of Kult (2025)
- WWE
  - NXT Tag Team Championship (1 time) – with Eric Young
  - NXT Year-End Award (1 time)
    - Tag Team of the Year (2017) – with Eric Young and Killian Dain
