= Smokin' Aces (professional wrestling) =

Professional wrestling tag team

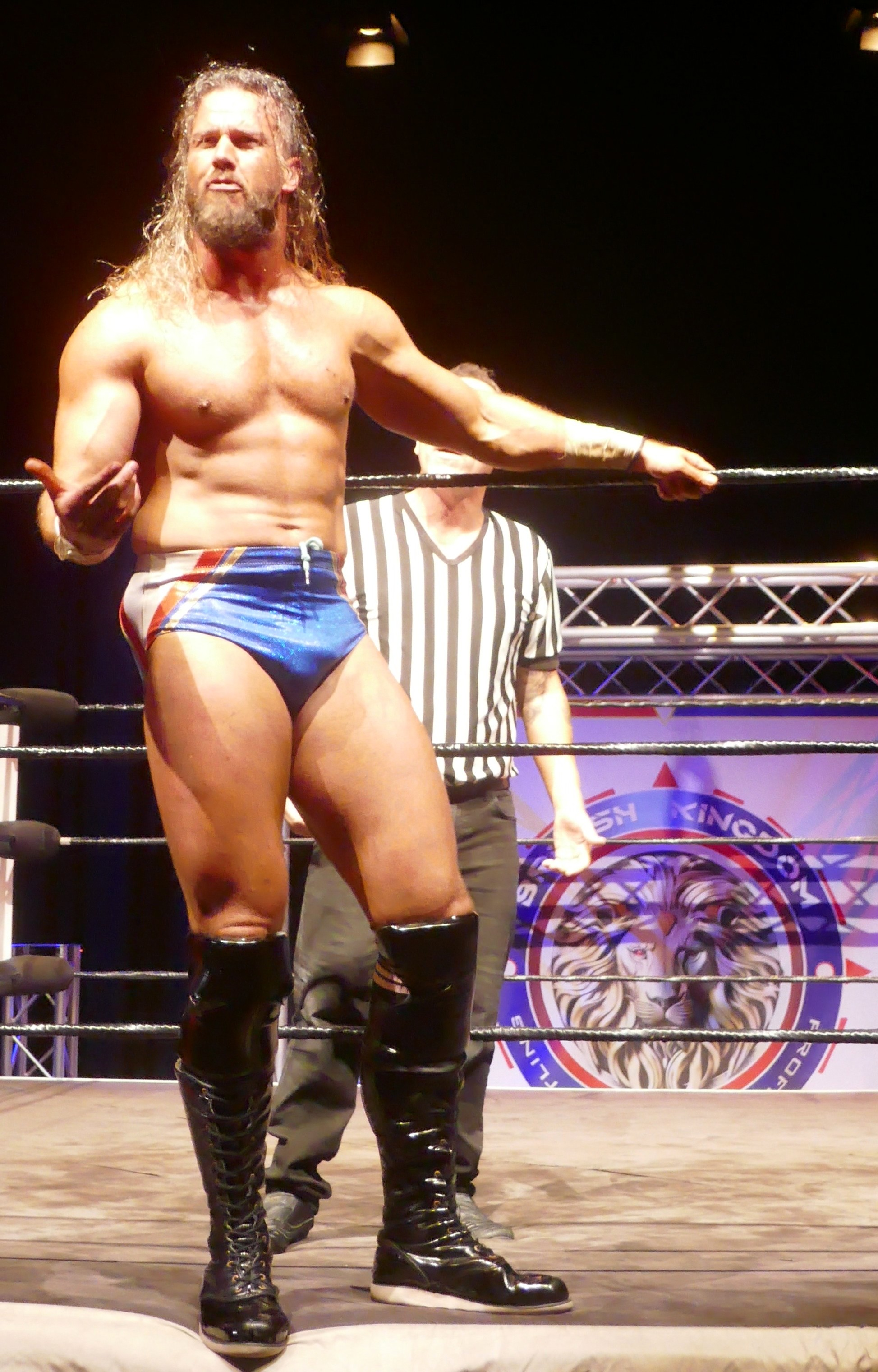
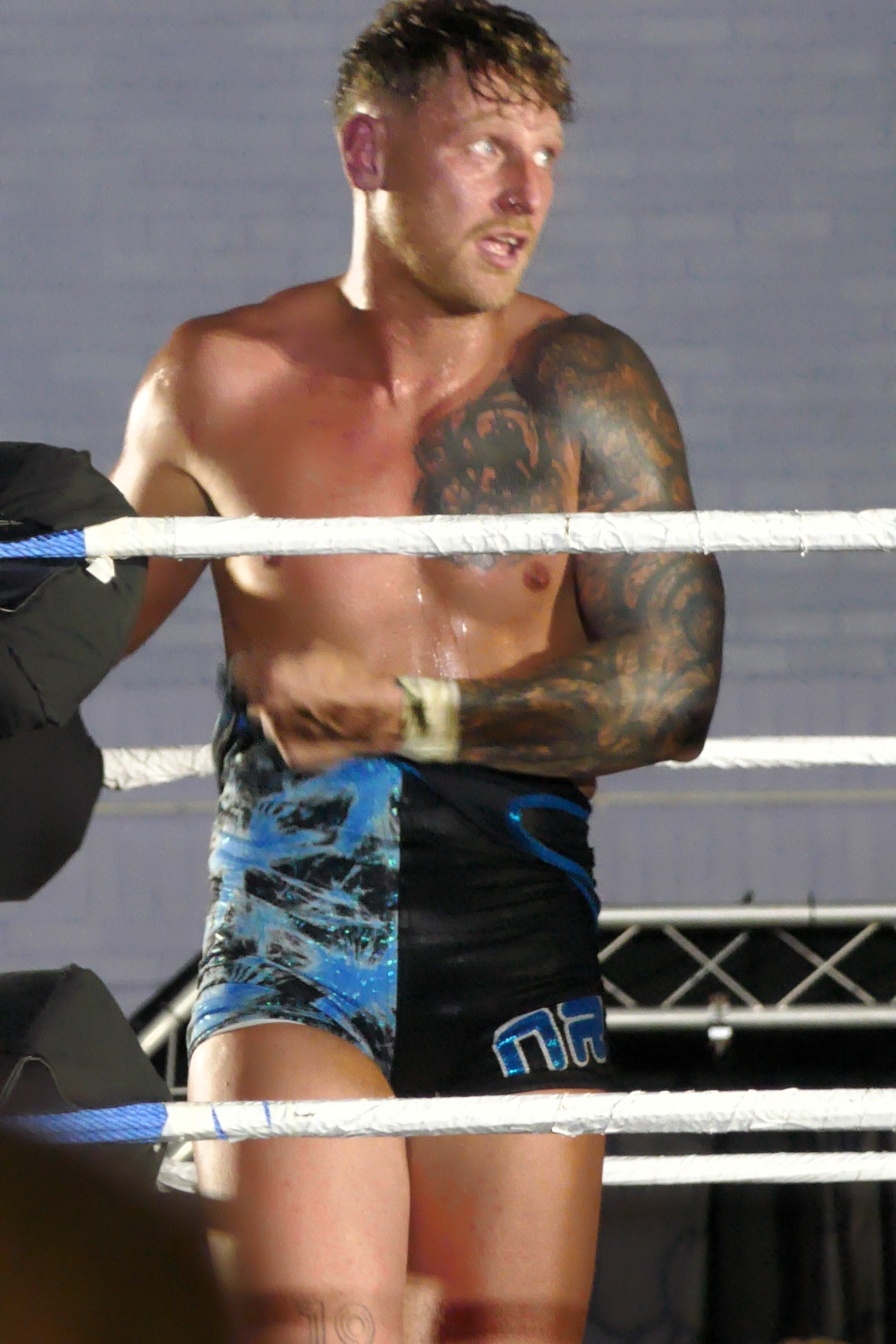
- Charlie Sterling (left) and Nick Riley (right)

Tag team
- Members: Charlie Sterling; Nick Riley
- Name: Smokin' Aces
- Billed heights: Sterling: 6 ft 1 in (1.85 m); Riley: 5 ft 9 in (1.75 m)
- Combined billed weight: Sterling: 224 lbs Riley:156 lbs
- Debut: 2021
- Disbanded: 2025
- Years active: 2021–2025

Smokin' Aces was a British professional wrestling tag team consisting of Charlie Sterling (real name Zack Garrett) and Nick Riley (real name Nick Griffin) best known for their tenure with the English professional wrestling promotion Progress Wrestling where they are former three-time PROGRESS Tag Team Champions. They also performed on the British independent scene and for various other promotions.

== Professional wrestling career ==
=== Progress Wrestling (2021–2025) ===
Sterling and Riley made their debut as a tag team at Chapter 109: Dreaming In 3D Results on April 24, 2021, where they defeated Greedy Souls (Brendan White and Danny Jones) in the quarterfinals of a tournament disputed for the vacant PROGRESS Tag Team Championship. They came unsuccessful in the tournament, but several months later at Chapter 121: In 20 Years This Will All Be Orange on September 11, 2021, they defeated Lykos Gym (Kid Lykos and Kid Lykos II) to win the titles for the first time. At Progress Chapter 170: Wrestling Never Sleeps on August 26, 2024, they unsuccessfully challenged Sanity (Big Damo and Axel Tischer) and Sunshine Machine (Chuck Mambo and TK Cooper) in a three-way tag team match for the PROGRESS Tag Team Championship. One month later at Progress Chapter 171: History Is Written By The Victors on September 22, 2024, Sterling and Riley succeeded in defeating Damo and Tischer to win the tag team titles for a record three-times at the moment of th event. At Progress Chapter 172: Werewolves Of London on October 27, 2024, they defended the titles against The Experience (LA Taylor and Skye Smitson). They lost the titles a Progress Chapter 178: Fix Your Hearts to Sunshine Machine (Chuck Mambo and TK Cooper), where they was forcing to disband.

=== Revolution Pro Wrestling (2022–2025) ===
Sterling and Riley made their debut in Revolution Pro Wrestling (RevPro) at RevPro Epic Encounter 2022 on May 22, where they teamed up with Lykos Gym (Kid Lykos and Kid Lykos II) to defeat Shota Umino, Sunshine Machine (Chuck Mambo and TK Cooper) and Yota Tsuji in an eight-man tag team match. Sterling and Riley competed in the 2022 edition of the Great British Tag League in which they placed themselves in the A Block of the competition and fought against the teams of Aussie Open (Kyle Fletcher and Mark Davis), Destination Everywhere (Connor Mills and Michael Oku) and Arrows Of Hungary (Dover and Icarus), failing to score any points in the competition.

== Championships and accomplishments ==
- Evolution Wrestling
  - Evolution Tag Team Championship (1 time)
- Pro Wrestling Chaos
  - King Of Chaos Championship (1 time) – Sterling
  - Knights Of Chaos Championship (2 times)
- Over the Top Wrestling
  - OTT Tag Team Championship (1 time) – Sterling with Adam Maxted (Note: Maxted was not sanctioned as a freebird rule member of the team during this reign.)
- Pro Wrestling Illustrated
  - Ranked No. 85 of the top 100 tag teams in the PWI Tag Team 100 of 2023
  - Ranked Sterling No. 345 of the top 500 singles wrestlers in the PWI 500 in 2025
- Progress Wrestling
  - PROGRESS Tag Team Championship (3 times)
- Reach Wrestling
  - Reach Championship (1 time) – Sterling
