= Lana Austin =

English professional wrestler (born 1986)

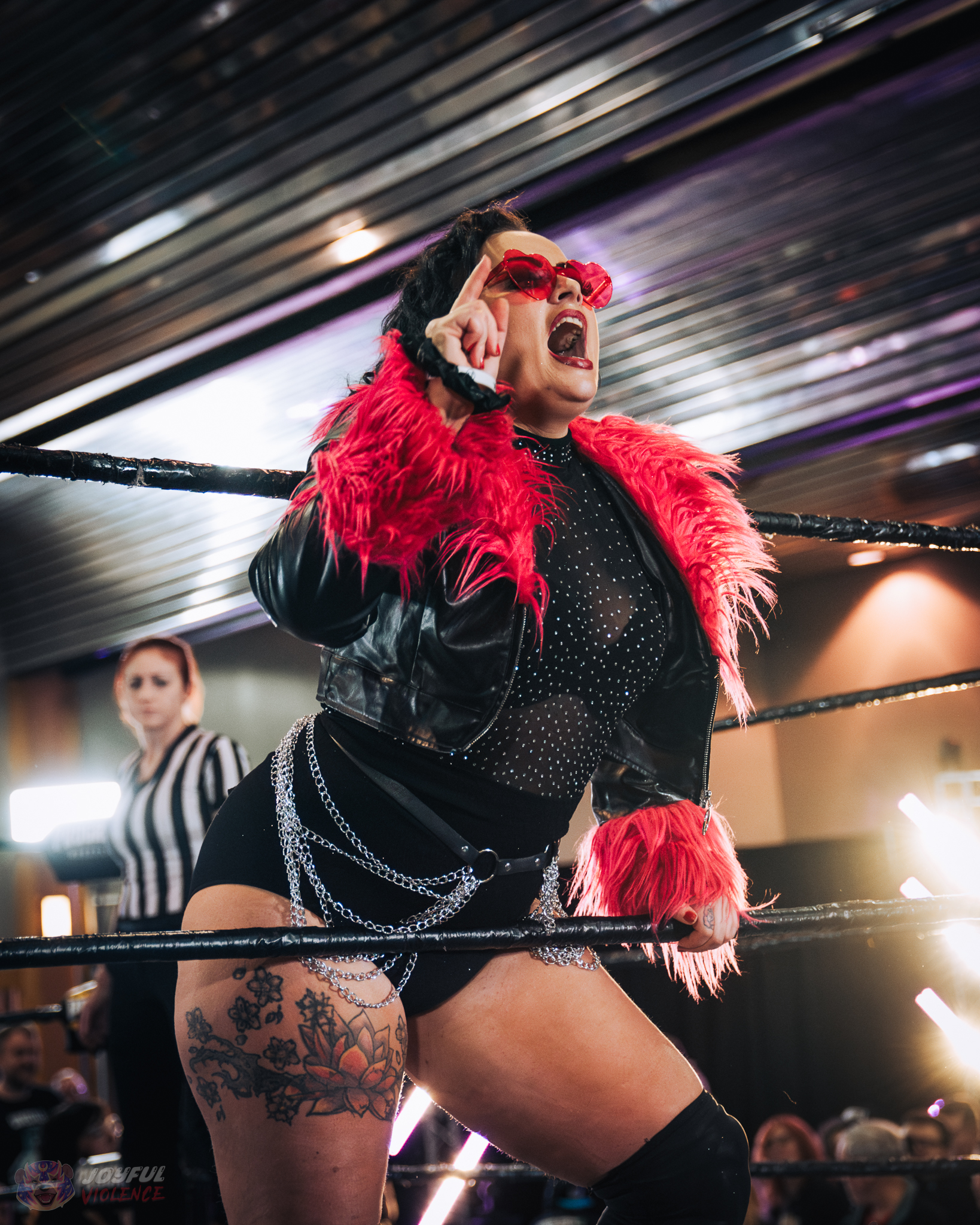
- Austin in April 2024

Personal information
- Born: LeeAnn Adele Austin; 22 September 1986 (age 40) Manchester, England

Professional wrestling career
- Ring name: Lana Austin
- Billed height: 155 cm (5 ft 1 in)
- Billed weight: 51 kg (112 lb)
- Trained by: Johnnie Brannigan
- Debut: 3 August 2013

LeeAnn Adele "Lana" Austin (born 22 September 1986) is an English professional wrestler who currently performs on the independent circuit. She is best known for her tenure with Progress Wrestling, where she became a one-time Progress Wrestling World Women's Champion.

Austin has also wrestled around the world for promotions such as WWE, Tokyo Joshi Pro-Wrestling, Revolution Pro Wrestling, Pro-Wrestling: EVE, Defiant Wrestling, Over The Top Wrestling, and TNT Extreme Wrestling.

== Early life ==
LeeAnn Adele Austin was born in Manchester on 22 September 1986.

== Professional wrestling career ==
=== British independent circuit (2013–present) ===
After training with Johnnie Brannigan, Austin made her professional wrestling debut at a house show promoted by Britannia Wrestling Promotions on 3 August 2013, where she defeated Nixon and Porsche in a three-way match. She has since appeared in British promotions such as Progress Wrestling, Revolution Pro Wrestling, Pro-Wrestling: EVE, Defiant Wrestling, FutureShock, Over The Top Wrestling, and many others.

Austin competed in the 2019 edition of Westside Xtreme Wrestling's wXw Femmes Fatales tournament where she defeated Baby Allison in the first rounds, then fell short to LuFisto in the second ones. She competed in the 2019 edition of the RevPro Queen of the Ring where she defeated Shax in the first rounds, then fell short to Lizzy Evo in the second ones. At ROH Honor United - Newport on 26 October 2019, Austin unsuccessfully challenged Kelly Klein for the Women of Honor World Championship.

=== Progress Wrestling (2018–present) ===
Austin is best known for her tenure with Progress Wrestling. She made her debut in the promotion at Progress Chapter 78: 24 Hour Progress People on 11 November 2018, where she fell short to Isla Dawn. She started with sporadic appearances in the promotion's flagship events, having had her next match at Progress Chapter 90: The Lonesome Death Of The One-Man Cabaret Act on 30 June 2019, where she fell short to Candy Floss. Shortly after, she moved to the title scene as she eventually competed in a number one contendership match for the Progress Wrestling World Women's Championship at Progress Chapter 105: Bring The Thunder on 27 February 2021, bout won by Kanji and also involving Alexxis Falcon, Gisele Shaw, Mercedes Blaze, Millie McKenzie and Taonga. She directly competed for the women's title at Progress Chapter 142: The Deadly Viper Tour on 25 September 2022, where she unsuccessfully challenged Kanji. She succeeded in defeating Kanji to win the women's title four episodes later, at Progress Chapter 146: They Think It's All Over... on 27 November 2022. She dropped the title after 329 days and seven successful defenses to Rhio at Progress Chapter 158: The Long Halloween on 22 October 2023.

=== Pro-Wrestling: EVE (2018–present) ===
Austin made her debut in Pro-Wrestling: EVE at EVE Shevivor Series on 8 December 2018, where she teamed up with Kellyanne, Mercedez Blaze and Sierra Loxton as "Team Loxton" in a losing effort against "The Moths" (Erin Angel, Martina, Jetta and Laura Di Matteo. At EVE Wrestle Queendom 4 on 27 August 2021, Austin competed in a Royal Rumble match for the Pro-Wrestling: EVE Championship won by Jetta and also involving reigning champion Rhia O'Reilly, Zoe Lucas, Alex Windsor, Debbie Keitel and many others. At EVE Brawl At The Brewery on 5 March 2022, Austin fell short to Alexxis Falcon in a number one contendership match for the Pro-Wrestling: EVE International Championship. At EVE 120: Women Behaving Badly on 8 March 2024, she teamed up with "The Decibelles" tag team partner Ivy as they unsuccessfully challenged Operation SAS (Nightshade and Skye Smitson) for the Pro-Wrestling: EVE Tag Team Championship.

=== Tokyo Joshi Pro-Wrestling (2020) ===
Austin made a brief excursion to the Japanese independent scene where she made several appearances in Tokyo Joshi Pro-Wrestling. She made her debut on the first night of the TJPW Tokyo Joshi 2020 Winter Wonderful Harmony series of events from 2 February where she teamed up with Bakuretsu Sisters (Nodoka Tenma and Yuki Aino) to defeat Magical Sugar Rabbits (Mizuki and Yuka Sakazaki) and Mina Shirakawa. She made her last appearance at the 11 February event where she unsuccessfully challenged Yuka Sakazaki for the Princess of Princess Championship.

=== WWE (2019–2020) ===
Austin briefly competed for WWE's NXT UK branch as indie developmental talent. She made her first appearance at WWE NXT UK #26 on 13 January 2019, where she was defeated by Nina Samuels. She made her last appearance at WWE NXT UK #133 on 25 February 2021, where she fell short to Aoife Valkyrie.

== Championships and accomplishments ==
- Atomic Pro Wrestling
  - Atomic Rumble (2025)
- Attack! Pro Wrestling
  - Attack! 24:7 Championship (1 time)
- Evolution Wrestling
  - Evolution Women's Championship (1 time)
- Full Force Wrestling
  - FFW Women's Championship (2 times)
- FutureShock Wrestling
  - FSW Women's Championship (4 times)
- Grand Pro Wrestling
  - GPW Tag Team Championship (1 time) – with LA Austin
  - GPW Women's Championship (1 time)
- Infinite Promotions
  - Infinite Women's Championship (1 time) – with Hollie Barlow
- Insane Championship Wrestling
  - ICW Women's World Championship (1 time)
- Kamikaze Pro
  - Kamikaze Pro Fighting Females Championship (1 time)
- Lancashire Wrestling Federation
  - LWF Women's Championship (1 time)
- Odyssey Pro Wrestling
  - OPW Women's Championship (1 time, current)
- Progress Wrestling
  - Progress Wrestling World Women's Championship (1 time)
- Pro Wrestling Chaos
  - Maiden Of Chaos Championship (1 time)
- Pro-Wrestling: EVE
  - Pro-Wrestling: EVE Tag Team Championship (1 time) – with Hollie Barlow
- Pro Wrestling Illustrated
  - Ranked No. 48 of the top 250 female singles wrestlers in the PWI Women's 250 in 2023
- Pro Wrestling All Stars
  - PWA Queen Of Diamonds Championship (2 times)
- Southside Wrestling Entertainment
  - SWE Tag Team Championship (1 time) – with Session Moth Martina
  - Southside Women's Championship (1 time)
- Tidal Championship Wrestling
  - TCW Women's Championship (1 time)
- TNT Extreme Wrestling
  - TNT Undisputed Women's Championship (2 times)
  - TNT Women's Tag Team Championship (1 time, current) – with Hollie Barlow
  - TNT IGNition Women’s Championship (1 time)
  - Women's Level Up Briefcase (2025)
  - First TNT Women’s Triple Crown Champion
- WrestlingKULT
  - Women Of KULT Championship (1 time)
