= Electric Ballroom =

Performance venue in Camden Town, London, England

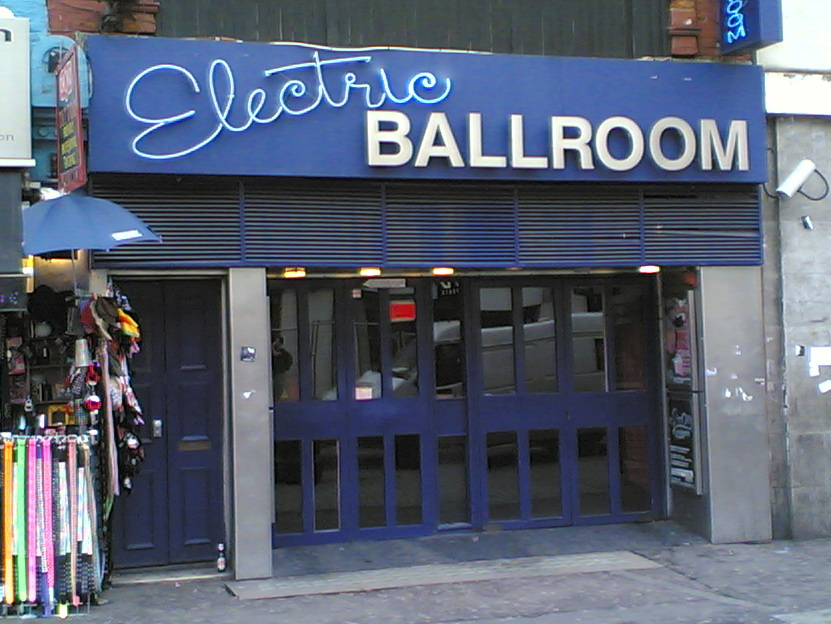
- Interactive map of Electric Ballroom
- Location: Camden, London
- Coordinates: 51.539722°N 0.143056°W
- Capacity: 1,500
- Public transit: Camden Town

The Electric Ballroom is a 1,500-capacity performance venue (primarily for rock bands) and indoor market located at 184 Camden High Street in Camden Town, London, England.

== History ==
The Electric Ballroom started as an Irish ballroom in the 1930s, renamed as Electric Ballroom in the summer of 1978 and owned by Bill Fuller, up until his death in 2008, aged 91. It hosts various events.

== Venue ==
The two-storey building has two dance floors and four bars. The ground floor has a stage and full concert facilities, with a capacity of 1,500.

Stand Up Central (formerly known as Russell Howard's Stand Up Central) is a British stand-up comedy television show in front of a live audience at the Electric Ballroom.

MTV Brand New for (2011–2018) is a showcase at Electric Ballroom.

The Electric Ballroom was a roller disco for a brief period from the late 1970s to the early 1980s. By 1990, the building had an indoor market on weekends with about fifty stalls, selling a variety of fashion-, lifestyle- and music-related goods. The market closed at short notice in 2015, resulting in unemployment for many staff and traders.

The Friday club night is Sin City, playing rock and alternative genres. The Friday club was formerly goth night Full Tilt. On Saturday, "Shake" plays mostly pop and dance from the 1970s, 1980s onwards, as well as modern hip hop and R&B.

The Electric Ballroom is the London home for PROGRESS Wrestling, holding events on a regular basis since March 2014.

On 15 April 2018, the People's Vote campaign was started there.

== Camden Town tube station ==
Transport for London proposed to demolish the Electric Ballroom in order to allow the redevelopment of the Camden Town Underground station, but the planning application for the redevelopment was rejected by Camden London Borough Council in 2004. A revised proposal from Transport for London in 2005 to demolish the whole block including the Ballroom, Buck Street Market and the Dr Martens store was rejected by Deputy Prime Minister John Prescott. In 2007 the government declared the Electric Ballroom a dilapidated building, a new argument which allows planning for the extension of the Camden Town tube station to be restarted. A public consultation ended on 22 February 2007. Details, the adoption statement and the adopted planning brief for the Camden Town Underground Station site are on the Camden Council website.
