= Killian Dain =

Northern Irish professional wrestler (born 1985)

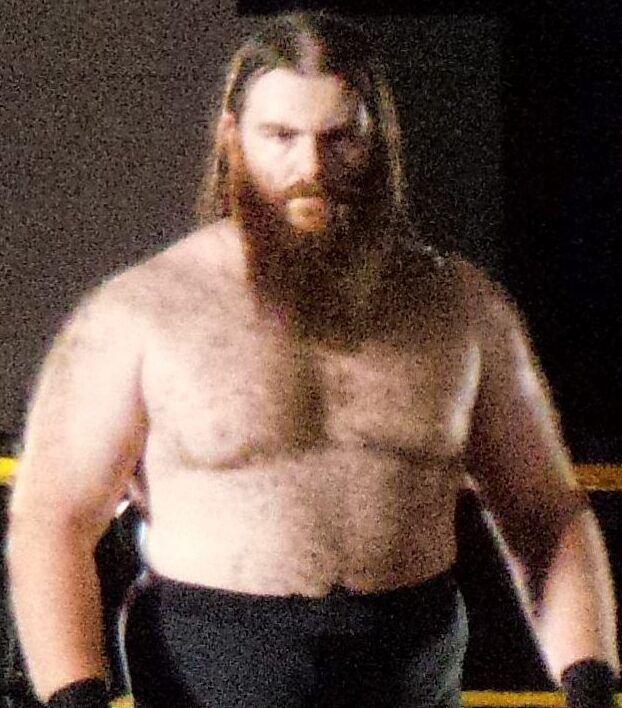
- Dain in May 2017

Personal information
- Born: Damian Mackle; 20 February 1985 (age 41) Belfast, Northern Ireland
- Spouse: Nikki Cross (m. 2019)

Professional wrestling career
- Ring name(s): Big Damo; Damian O'Connor; Damo; Killian Dain
- Billed height: 6 ft 4 in (1.93 m)
- Billed weight: 322 lb (146 kg)
- Billed from: Belfast, Northern Ireland
- Trained by: Robbie Brookside
- Debut: 2005

Damian Mackle (born 20 February 1985) is a Northern Irish professional wrestler. He is signed to Major League Wrestling (MLW), where he performs under the ring name Big Damo and is a member of Contra Unit. He also performs on the independent circuit and is the co-owner of the independent promotion Progress Wrestling. He is best known for his time in WWE, where he performed under the ring name Killian Dain.

Prior to joining WWE, Mackle won the ICW World Heavyweight Championship while wrestling for Insane Championship Wrestling. He also wrestled for numerous promotions on the British independent circuit, around Europe, and in the USA including All Elite Wrestling, Progress Wrestling, Revolution Pro Wrestling, Westside Xtreme Wrestling, Absolute Intense Wrestling, Beyond Wrestling, Premier British Wrestling, Scottish Wrestling Alliance, What Culture Pro Wrestling and IPW:UK.

On 19 October 2016, WWE announced that Mackle had signed a developmental contract with the company and had arrived at the WWE Performance Center in Orlando, Florida. He began to work in the NXT brand as part of the stable Sanity, along with Nikki Cross, Eric Young and Alexander Wolfe. In 2018, Dain, Wolfe and Young were drafted to SmackDown, where they worked as a stable until the dissolution. Then, he was drafted again to NXT, where he stayed until his release, in June 2021.

== Early life ==
Born and raised in Belfast, Mackle played as a goalkeeper for his university football side. He also played rugby union (up to university level), basketball and judo. He stated that as a child he was attracted to professional wrestling because of the "larger than life" personas and face paint of wrestlers such as Sting and The Ultimate Warrior. He cites fellow countryman Fit Finlay as a huge influence on his wrestling style and inspiration for his success.

== Professional wrestling career ==
=== Early career (2004–2013) ===
Mackle began his professional wrestling training in Scotland with Scottish Championship Wrestling, before moving on to train with the SWA/NWA Scotland under Robbie Brookside (now a trainer at WWE NXT) and others. Of Brookside, he stated; "I don't think there is enough hyperbole to explain how good a coach he is...I can't think of a better coach I'd met in any sport". After training at NWA Scotland, Mackle debuted for the Scottish Wrestling Alliance at the age of 20 under the ring name Damian O'Connor. He originally wrestled in Scotland and the North of England as a tag team called "Britain's Most Wanted" with Scott Renwick. Together the two won a variety of tournaments and tag team championships in promotions such as SWA (4 times), W3L (2 times), SSW and 3CW. While they never officially split up, they would both focus on singles competition around 2009. This proved to be fruitful for both and O'Connor started touring his native Ireland, the United Kingdom, mainland Europe and the United States. O'Connor would win the Heavyweight Titles in SWE, W3L, XWA, Pride as well as the Laird of the Ring Title in SWA. In 2009, O'Connor took over the SWA training school named the "Source Wrestling School". O'Connor has trained numerous wrestlers, including Joe Coffey, Joe Hendry and Nikki Cross.

=== Insane Championship Wrestling (2012–2016, 2018) ===
O'Connor wrestled sporadically for ICW between 2009 and 2012 under various gimmicks, but his return in November 2013 saw him debut as Big Damo. After a long feud with Drew Galloway, Damo defeated Chris Renfrew for the ICW World Heavyweight Championship in Belfast on 27 February 2016, marking the first time the title changed hands outside of Glasgow and making Damo the first ever Northern Irish-born champion. Damo defended the title in Ireland, the United Kingdom and the United States against the likes of Drew Galloway, Grado, VSK, Jack Jester and others. On 31 July 2016, at Shug's Hoose Party III, Damo was defeated for the Championship by Joe Coffey.

On 11 November 2018. O'Connor (as Killian Dain) returned to ICW for one night only, defeating Mikey Whiplash.

=== Independent circuit (2014–2016) ===
In December 2014, Damo unsuccessfully challenged Drew Galloway for the EVOLVE Championship in Inverness, Scotland.

In 2014, Damo debuted in Revolution Pro Wrestling. In 2015, he wrestled NJPW greats Tomohiro Ishii, Hiroshi Tanahashi Shinsuke Nakamura, as well as Tommaso Ciampa. In 2016, he wrestled international wrestlers "Speedball" Mike Bailey, Roderick Strong, Dalton Castle, Big Daddy Walter and Matt Sydal.

In October 2015, Damo debuted for Global Force Wrestling (GFW) on their UK Invasion tour, losing to Bram. That same month, Damo unsuccessfully challenged Chaos for the Union of European Wrestling Alliances European Heavyweight Championship in a triple threat match with Lionheart.

=== Total Nonstop Action Wrestling (2016) ===
In January 2016, Damo appeared for Total Nonstop Action (TNA) as part of their Maximum Impact tour.

On the 1 March episode of IMPACT Wrestling, Big Damo unsuccessfully challenged Eric Young for the TNA King of the Mountain Championship. At TNA One Night Only: Joker's Wild, Big Damo and Jimmy Havoc were defeated by Drew McIntyre and Mike Bennett. On the 8 March episode of IMPACT Wrestling, Big Damo competed in a King of the Mountain match for Young's King of the Mountain Championship also featuring Havoc, Ospreay and Bram; Young successfully retained.

=== WWE (2016–2021) ===
==== Sanity (2016–2019) ====
In June 2016, Mackle signed with WWE to perform on their NXT brand. On 19 October 2016, WWE announced that Mackle had signed a developmental contract with the company and had arrived at the WWE Performance Center in Orlando, Florida. On 4 November, Mackle appeared at an NXT live event and cut a promo. Mackle made his in-ring debut at an NXT live event on 11 November, defeating Rich Swann under the ring name Damian O'Connor. He then reverted to using the ring name Damo.

On the 7 December episode of NXT, Damo attacked No Way Jose and seemed to align himself with the heel stable SAnitY. In January 2017, he began to wrestle under the new ring name Killian Dain. On the 18 January episode of NXT, Dain joined SAnitY in an official capacity after attacking Tye Dillinger and accepting Sawyer Fulton's jacket from Eric Young. On the 25 January episode of NXT, Dain appeared as part of SAnitY for the first time, attacking Chris Atkins by Young's order. On the 8 February episode of NXT, Dain teamed with Young and Alexander Wolfe to defeat Dillinger, No Way Jose and Roderick Strong. Earlier in the night, Dain and Wolfe defeated The Bollywood Boyz. At WrestleMania 33, Dain made it to the final three in the André the Giant Memorial Battle Royal before being eliminated by eventual winner Mojo Rawley. On the 19 July episode of NXT, Dain lost to Drew McIntyre in an NXT Championship No. 1 Contender's match, marking his first televised loss.

On the 28 March 2018 episode of NXT, Dain was named as one of six participants in ladder match at NXT TakeOver: New Orleans to determine the inaugural NXT North American Champion. He, however was unsuccessful in winning. On the 18 April episode of NXT, Dain lost a No Disqualification match to Lars Sullivan.

During the 2018 WWE Superstar Shake-up, SAnitY (excluding Cross) were drafted to SmackDown. The group debuted on the 19 June episode of SmackDown LIVE where they attacked The Usos. The following week, SAnitY lost to The Usos and Jeff Hardy. On the 3 July episode of SmackDown LIVE, the group attacked The New Day. This led to a tables match between the two teams at Extreme Rules, which SAnitY won. On the 24 July episode of SmackDown LIVE, SAnitY and The New Day faced off in the first round of the WWE SmackDown Tag Team Championship No. 1 Contender's tournament. SAnitY (represented by Dain and Wolfe) were defeated.

The group competed in only two more televised matches throughout the remainder of 2018, while primarily competing at live events.

After a near four-month hiatus from television, SAnitY returned on the 2 April 2019 episode of SmackDown LIVE, losing a three-on-one Falls Count Anywhere match to The Miz.

==== Return to NXT (2019–2021) ====
During the 2019 WWE Superstar Shake-up, Young was drafted to Raw. With Wolfe joining NXT UK, the group was officially disbanded. Dain made his return to NXT live events on 16 May, defeating Jermaine Haley. On the 3 July episode of NXT, a promo advertising Dain's return was aired. He made his return on the 17 July episode of NXT, attacking Matt Riddle following Riddle's match against Arturo Ruas. This led to a match between the two being scheduled for the 7 August episode of NXT. However, Dain attacked Riddle before the match could begin. On the September 25 episode of NXT, Riddle defeated Dain in a #1 contender's street fight match for the NXT Championship ending the feud. Shortly after, Dain would enter in a three-way feud with Pete Dunne and Damian Priest. At NXT TakeOver: WarGames (2019), Dain faced Dunne and Priest in a triple threat match to determine the #1 contender for the NXT Championship which Dunne won. In September 2020, he formed a dysfunctional tag team with Drake Maverick, turning face in the process. On June 25, 2021, Dain was released from his WWE contract, this as part of a fourth round of layoffs executed by the brand due to the effect of the COVID-19 pandemic.

=== Return to independent circuit (2021–present) ===
After leaving WWE, Mackle returned to performing on the independent scene under his Big Damo name. In February 2022, it was announced Damo was joining the new Control Your Narrative wrestling promotion created by EC3 and Adam Scherr.

=== Return to ICW (2021–present) ===
After leaving WWE, Damo returned to ICW under his original name in 2021. He would feud with Andy Wild, going to a twenty-minute time limit draw at Fear & Loathing XIII before Wild defeated Damo in a steel cage match at Barred II 24 April 2022.

In 2023, Damo challenged Leyton Buzzard twice for the ICW World Heavyweight Championship. On ICW Fight Club they went to a no-contest when Andy Roberts interfered. Damo was given a rematch in a Three Way Dance at ICW's Get The F Out! PPV but was eliminated from the contest by Roberts.

=== All Elite Wrestling (2022) ===
On the May 20, 2022 episode of AEW Rampage, Mackle made his debut in All Elite Wrestling (AEW), using his ring name "Big Damo." In his debut match, Damo was defeated by Shawn Spears.

=== New Japan Pro Wrestling (2022) ===
On the June 4, 2022 episode of NJPW Strong, Big Damo made his debut in New Japan Pro Wrestling losing to Tomohiro Ishii.

=== Major League Wrestling (2026–present) ===
On April 21, 2026, it was announced that Damo had signed with Major League Wrestling (MLW). Damo competed in the 2026 Opera Cup, where he was eliminated in the third round by Matt Riddle. On the July 18 episode of MLW Fusion, Damo joined Contra Unit.

=== Progress Wrestling (2026–present) ===
On 26 May 2026, it was announced that Big Damo and his wife Nikki Storm (formerly Nikki Cross in WWE) had purchased Progress Wrestling and DEFY Wrestling. Three months later, Damo and Storm sold DEFY back to the original founders.

== Personal life ==
Mackle is a lifelong supporter of Premier League team Manchester United and NBA team Orlando Magic. He has stated that he believes wrestling – unlike other sports – can be a uniting factor for people in his native Belfast as there are "no (sectarian) affiliations" in wrestling. He stated that he would not support Scottish football because there is "a lot of connotations" with sectarianism. He grew up in what he described as a mixed area and is conscious of keeping political affiliations out of his public life.

On January 17, 2019, Mackle married fellow WWE wrestler, Nicola Glencross, known by her ring name Nikki Cross.

== Other media ==
Dain appears as a playable character in the video games WWE 2K18 and WWE 2K19.

== Championships and accomplishments ==
- BODYSLAM Pro Wrestling
  - BODYSLAM Tag Team Championship (1 time) – with Axel Tischer
- 3 Count Wrestling
  - 3CW Tag Team Championship (1 time) – with Scott Renwick
- Insane Championship Wrestling
  - ICW World Heavyweight Championship (1 time)
  - ICW Tag Team Championship (1 time) – with Axel Tischer
- Over The Top Wrestling
  - OTT World Championship (1 time)
- Pride Wrestling
  - Pride Wrestling Championship (1 time)
- Progress Wrestling
  - PROGRESS World Championship (1 time)
  - PROGRESS Atlas Championship (1 time)
  - Progress Tag Team Championship (1 time) – with Axel Tischer
  - First Triple Crown Champion
- Pro Wrestling Illustrated
  - Ranked No. 119 of the top 500 singles wrestlers in the PWI 500 in 2018
- Pro Wrestling Österrich
  - PWÖ Tag Team Championship (1 time) – with Axel Tischer
- Reckless Intent Wrestling
  - Reckless Intent Hardcore Championship (1 time)
  - Reckless Intent Heavyweight Championship (1 time)
- Scottish School of Wrestling
  - SSW Tag Team Championship (1 time) – with Scott Renwick
- Scottish Wrestling Alliance
  - SWA Laird of the Ring Championship (1 time)
  - SWA Tag Team Championship (6 times) – with Scott Renwick (4), Pete O'Neil (1), Micken (1)
- Scottish Wrestling Entertainment
  - SWE Heavyweight Championship (1 time)
- What Culture Pro Wrestling
  - WCPW Championship (1 time, inaugural)
- World Wide Wrestling League
  - W3L Heavyweight Championship (1 time)
  - W3L Tag Team Championship (1 time) – with Scott Renwick
  - W3L Heavyweight Title Tournament (2011)
- WWE
  - NXT Year-End Award (1 time)
    - Tag Team of the Year (2017) – with Alexander Wolfe and Eric Young
- X Wrestling Alliance
  - XWA British Heavyweight Championship (1 time)
  - XWA British Heavyweight Title Tournament (2014)
