= Progress Women's World Championship =

Professional wrestling championship

- The current Progress Women's World Championship belt design (2024–present)

Details
- Promotion: Progress Wrestling
- Date established: 28 May 2017
- Current champion: Rhio
- Date won: 26 July 2026

Other name
- Progress Women's Championship
Statistics
- First champion: Toni Storm
- Most reigns: Rhio (3 reigns)
- Longest reign: Jinny (2nd reign, 482 days)
- Shortest reign: Kanji (1st reign, 84 days)
- Oldest champion: Meiko Satomura (39 years, 302 days)
- Youngest champion: Toni Storm (21 years, 221 days)
- Heaviest champion: Jordynne Grace (150 lb (68 kg))
- Lightest champion: Jinny (128 lb (58 kg))

The Progress World Women's Championship is a women's world professional wrestling championship created and promoted by the British professional wrestling promotion Progress Wrestling. The current champions is Rhio, who is in her record-setting third reign. She won the title by defeating Alexxis Falcon at Chapter 196: Scorchio on 26 July 2026, in London, England.

== History ==
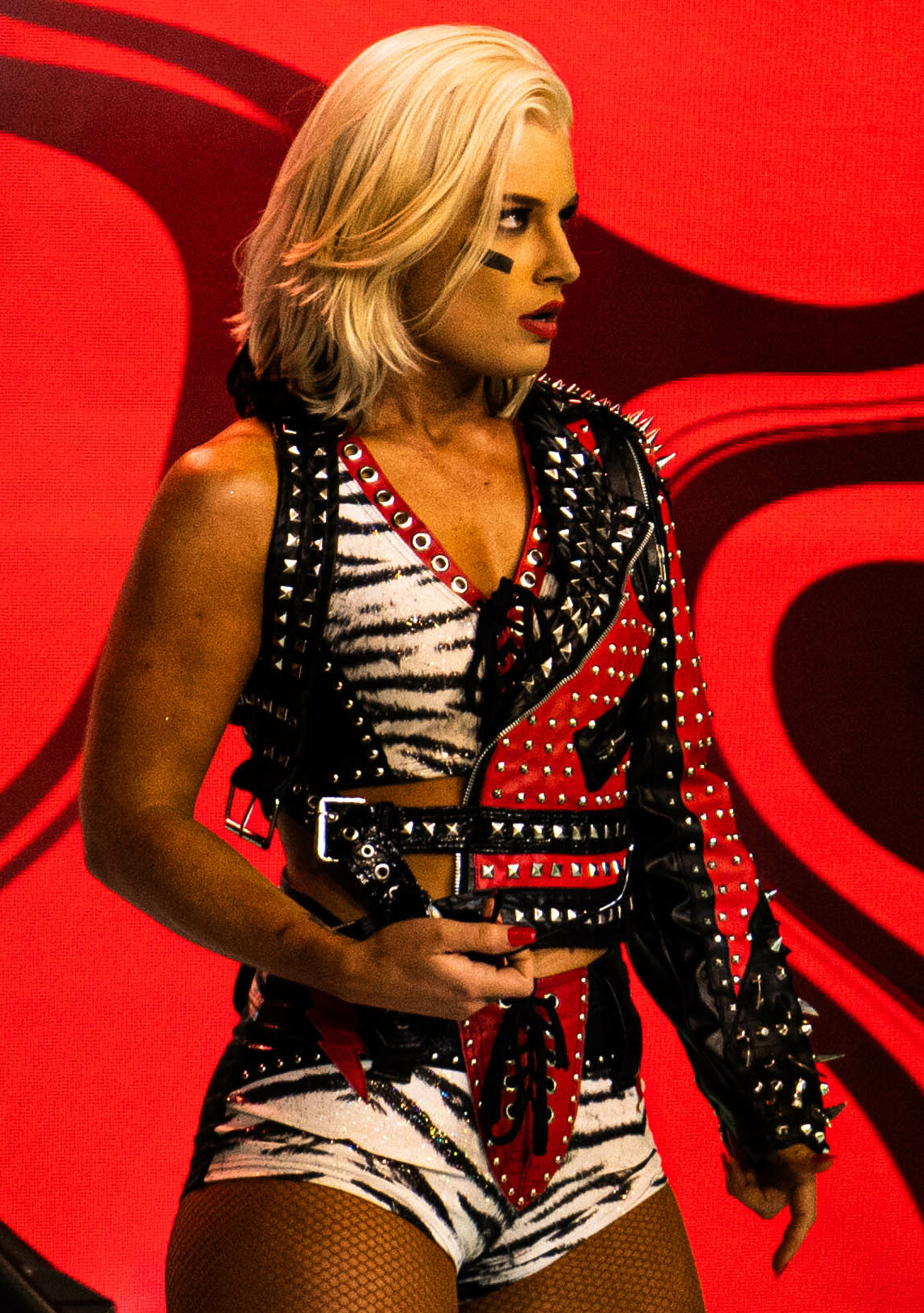
Inaugural champion Toni Storm

=== Inaugural championship tournament ===
The Natural Progression Series IV was a 12-woman single-elimination tournament held to crown the inaugural PROGRESS Women's Champion. This was the only edition of the tournament to feature female participants. In the three-way tournament final at Chapter 49: Super Strong Style 16 Tournament Edition on 28 May 2017, Toni Storm defeated Jinny and Laura Di Matteo to become the inaugural champion.

== Championship belt design ==
The original championship belt

The original Progress Women's World Championship belt was designed and crafted by Peter Ellis. At Chapter 169: The Devil On My Shoulder on July 28, 2024, a new design of the championship belt was unveiled. Progress Wrestling collaborated with Khalil Butt to create the new design, which bears a close resemblance to the Progress Men's World Championship belt but with a white strap, evocative of the design of the WWE Intercontinental Championship belt that was used from 1985 to 1998 and from 2011 to 2019. Then co-owner Lee McAteer highlighted the importance of parity between the male and female wrestlers with the redesign of the championship belt.

== Reigns ==
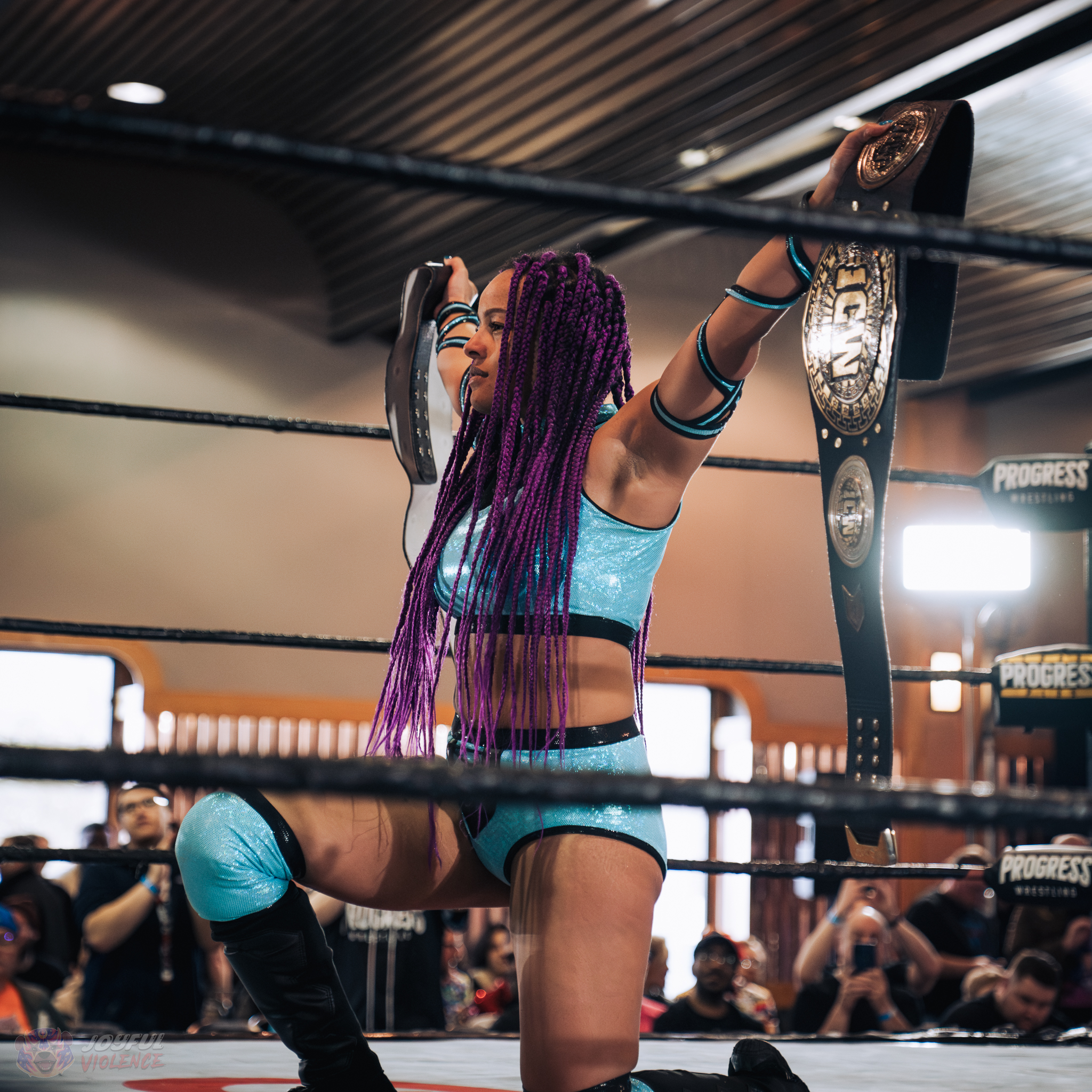
Current and record-setting three-time champion Rhio

Overall, there have been 15 reigns among 11 champions with two vacancies. Toni Storm is the inaugural champion. Rhio has the most reigns with three. Jinny in her second reign held the title the longest at 482 days with two successful title defenses, while Kanji in her first reign held the title the shortest at 82 days with three successful title defenses. Meiko Satomura is the oldest champion, winning the title at 39 years and 302 days old, while Storm is the youngest champion, winning the title at 21 years and 221 days old.

Rhio is the current champion in her record-setting third reign. She won the title by defeating Alexxis Falcon at Chapter 196: Scorchio on 26 July 2026, in London, England.

Key
No.	Overall reign number
Reign	Reign number for the specific champion
Days	Number of days held
Defenses	Number of successful defenses
+	Current reign is changing daily

No.	Champion	Championship change			Reign statistics			Notes	Ref.
No.	Champion	Date	Event	Location	Reign	Days	Defenses	Notes	Ref.
1	Toni Storm	28 May 2017	Chapter 49: Super Strong Style 16 Tournament Edition; Night 2	Camden Town, London, England	1	357	14	Defeated Jinny and Laura Di Matteo in the three-way Natural Progression Series IV final to become the inaugural champion.	
2	Jinny	20 May 2018	Chapter 69: Be Here Now	Manchester, England	1	224	6		
3	Jordynne Grace	30 December 2018	Chapter 82: Unboxing Live, A Dukla Prague Away Kit	Camden Town, London, England	1	259	9		
4	Meiko Satomura	15 September 2019	Chapter 95: Still Chasing	Haringey, London, England	1	91	1		
5	Jinny	15 December 2019	Chapter 99: With a Flake, Please	Sheffield, England	2	482	2		
—	Vacated	10 April 2021	—	—	—	—	—	Jinny vacated the title due to COVID-19 restrictions.	
6	Kanji	22 May 2021	Chapter 111: One Leg in the Air	Sheffield, England	1	84	3	Defeated Gisele Shaw 2–1 in a Best of Three series.	
—	Vacated	14 August 2021	—	—	—	—	—	Vacated after Kanji sustained an arm injury that would require surgery.	
7	Gisele Shaw	14 August 2021	Chapter 117: Making Diamonds	Sheffield, England	1	295	7	Defeated Alexxis Falcon and Mercedez Blaze in a three-way elimination match to win the vacant title.	
8	Kanji	5 June 2022	Chapter 135: Super Strong Style 16 Tournament Edition	London, England	2	175	7	Won 2–1 in a 2-out-of-3 falls match.	
9	Lana Austin	27 November 2022	Chapter 146: They Think It's All Over...	London, England	1	329	7		
10	Rhio	22 October 2023	Chapter 158: The Long Halloween	London, England	1	434	20		
11	Nina Samuels	29 December 2024	Chapter 175: Unboxing VII: The Curtain Call	London, England	1	126	3		
12	Rhio	4 May 2025	Super Strong Style 16 Tournament Edition; Night 1	London, England	2	175	4	This was a Title vs. PROGRESS Career match with Kanji as the special guest referee.	
13	Rayne Leverkusen	26 October 2025	Chapter 185: Jump In The Line	London, England	1	91	3		
14	Alexxis Falcon	25 January 2026	Chapter 189: In Darkest Night	London, England	1	182	3		
15	Rhio	26 July 2026	Chapter 196: Scorchio	London, England	3	98+	2		

== Combined reigns ==
As of 1 November 2026.

†	Indicates the current champion

Rank	Wrestler	No. of reigns	Combined defenses	Combined days
1	Rhio †	3	26	707+
2	Jinny	2	8	706
3	Toni Storm	1	14	357
4	Lana Austin	1	7	329
5	Gisele Shaw	1	7	295
6	Kanji	2	10	259
6	Jordynne Grace	1	9	259
8	Alexxis Falcon	1	3	182
9	Nina Samuels	1	3	126
10	Rayne Leverkusen	1	3	91
10	Meiko Satomura	1	1	91
