= Nina Samuels =

English professional wrestler (born 1988)

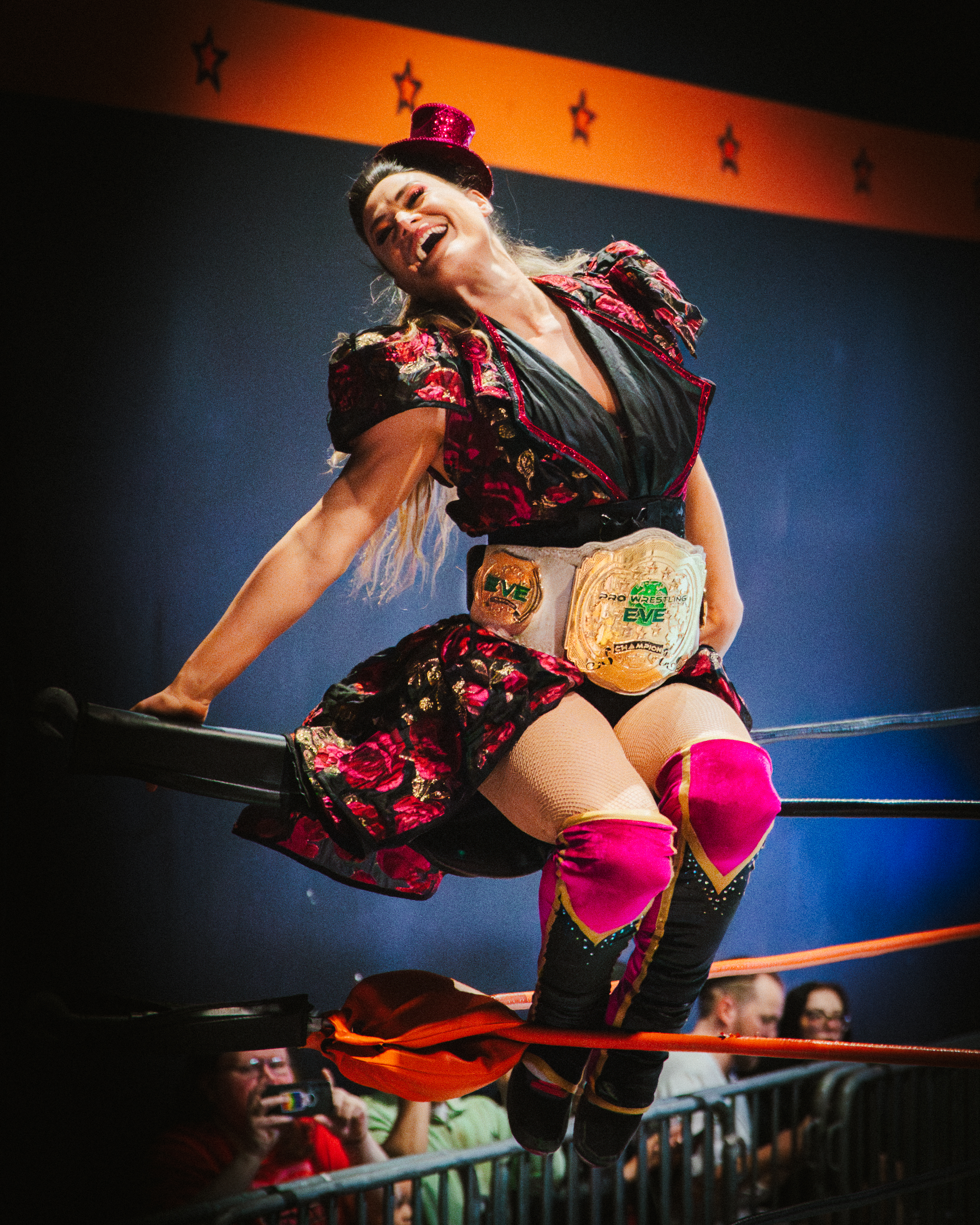
- Samuels in 2025

Personal information
- Born: Samantha Allen; 17 October 1988 (age 38) Aldershot, Hampshire, England
- Children: 2

Professional wrestling career
- Ring name: Nina Samuels
- Billed height: 1.70 m (5 ft 7 in)
- Billed weight: 70 kg (154 lb)
- Billed from: Aldershot, England'
- Trained by: London School of Lucha Libre
- Debut: 15 June 2014

Samantha Allen (born 17 October 1988), better known by her ring name Nina Samuels is an English professional wrestler. She is performing on the British independent circuit. She is best known for her time in WWE, where she performed on the NXT UK brand.

== Professional wrestling career ==
=== Independent circuit (2014–present) ===
Samuels began wrestling for British Empire Wrestling (BEW) in 2014. On 19 September at BEW/RCW Britain's Rising 2, Samuels teamed with Kirsty Love in a tag match against to Dragonita and Shanna. She returned at BEW Britain's Rising IV in a match against the then-champion Leah Owens for the Revolution Championship. Samuels competed on 3 June 2017, at the International Grand Prix Triple Threat match against Christi Jaynes and Shotzi Blackheart. Samuels debuted on the 18 February in Pro-Wrestling: EVE at EVE: A Day at the Resistance, where she teamed with Meiko Satomura and Shanna in a tag match losing to Emi Sakura, Erin Angel and Nixon Newell. She won the Wildcard Ladder Match at the 1st Wrestle Queendom on 5 May 2018. She cashed in her contract on 11 November 2018 during a match between Charlie Morgan and Kay Lee Ray, which she pinned Morgan to win the Pro-Wrestling: Eve Championship.

=== WWE (2018–2022) ===
On 25 August 2018, Samuels competed on the First Round NXT UK Women's Championship Tournament, where she was defeated by Dakota Kai. On 23 January 2019, Samuels faced Lana Austin, where Samuels was victorious. Samuels faced Toni Storm for the NXT UK Women's Championship on the 19 April episode of NXT UK. She competed in the Battle Royal to decide the number one contender for the NXT UK Women's Championship on the 14 June episode, where Kay Lee Ray was victorious. On 12 November 2020, Samuels went up against Xia Brookside. In the match, Samuels attempted to fake a knee injury but was backfired when Brookside rolled her up for the quick win. After the match, however, Samuels still gained the upper hand by assaulting Brookside at ringside. The feud between Samuels and Brookside would continue weeks to weeks. Notably, Samuels cost Brookside a match against Isla Dawn on 10 December 2020. Eventually, the two faced again on the 4 February 2021 episode of NXT UK, where Samuels was victorious after hitting Brookside with her handbag. Brookside demanded a rematch where the loser becomes the winner's personal assistant for a whole month. And on the 25 February episode, Brookside defeated Samuels in that match. Throughout in March, Samuels would be forced to work as Brookside's assistant. On 18 August 2022, Samuels was the one of several NXT UK employees released from their contracts with the announcement of NXT UK was going into hiatus and the upcoming launch of the new brand, NXT Europe.

== Personal life ==
On 30 April 2026, Samuels announced on her instagram that she is expecting twins. Samuels gave birth to her twin sons on 26 October 2026.

== Championships and accomplishments ==
- Championship Xtreme Wrestling
  - CXW Women's Championship (1 time)
- Evolution Wrestling
  - Evolution Limitless Championship (1 time)
- Lucha Britannia
  - Lucha Britannia World Championship (4 times)
- Progress Wrestling
  - Progress Wrestling World Women's Championship (1 time)
- Pro-Wrestling: EVE
  - Pro-Wrestling: EVE Championship (2 times)
  - Pro-Wrestling: EVE International Championship (1 time)
  - Pro-Wrestling: EVE Tag Team Championship (1 time) – with Chantal Jordan
  - SHE-1 2025
- Pro Wrestling Illustrated
  - Ranked No. 90 of the top 100 female singles wrestlers in the PWI Women's 100 in 2020
- Riot Cabaret Pro Wrestling
  - Riot Cabaret Women's Championship (1 time, inaugural)
- RISE England
  - Women's Wrestling Underground Championship (1 time)
- TIDAL Wrestling
  - TIDAL Women's Championship (1 time)
- Ultimate Pro Wrestling
  - BLW Women's Championship (1 time)
- WrestlingKULT
  - Women Of KULT Championship (1 time)
- World Wide Wrestling League
  - W3L Women's Championship (1 time)
