= Rhio =

English professional wrestler (born 1996)

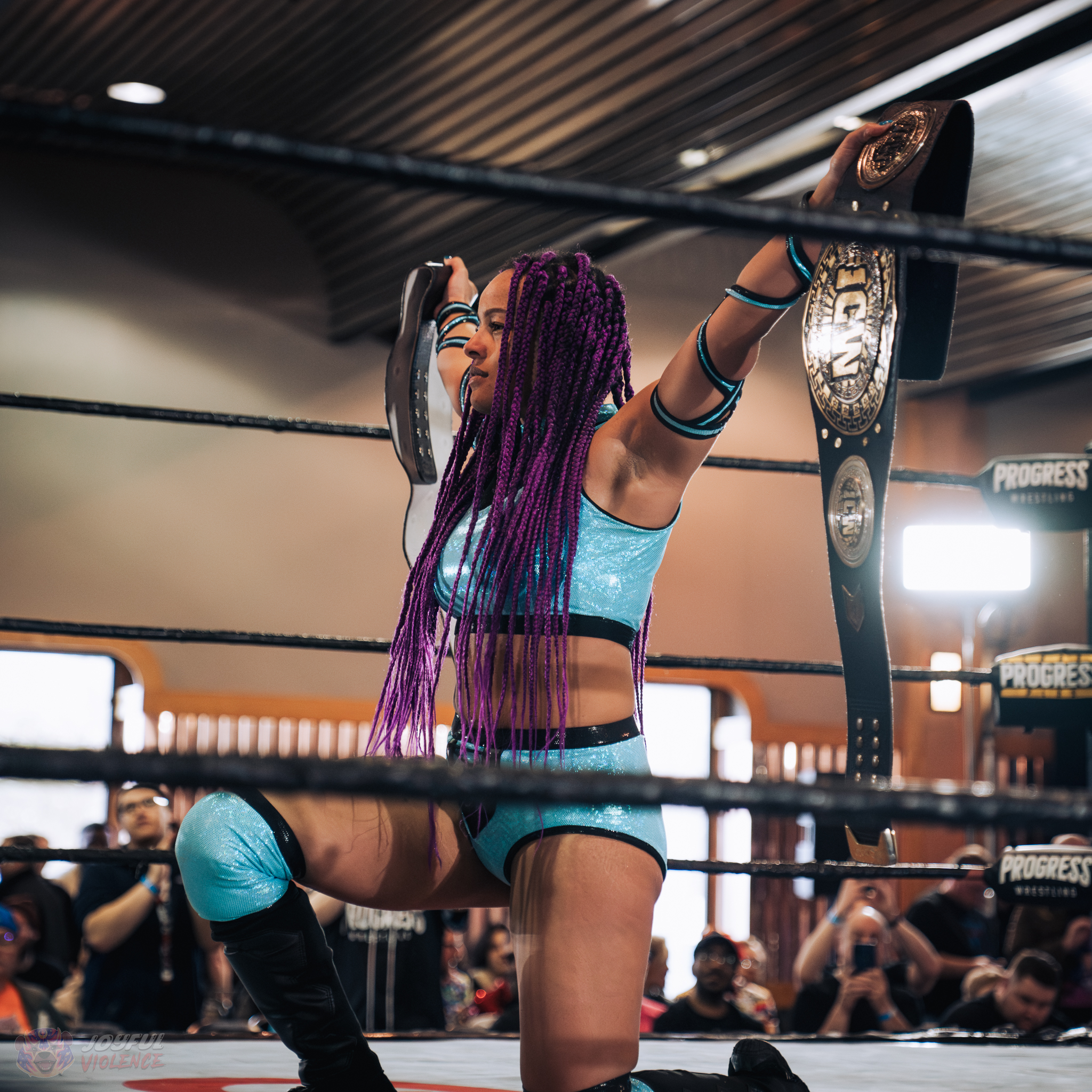
- Rhio in April 2024

Personal information
- Born: Rhianna McDonnell; 20 June 1996 (age 30) Preston, England

Professional wrestling career
- Ring name: Rhio
- Billed height: 5 ft 4 in (1.63 m)
- Billed from: Preston, Lancashire, England
- Trained by: PCW Wrestling School
- Debut: June 25, 2016

Rhianna McDonnell better known mononymously by her ring name Rhio (born 20 June 1996) is an English professional wrestler, currently working as a freelancer. She currently performs on the British independent circuit.

== Professional wrestling career ==
=== Pro Championship Wrestling (2016–2018) ===
McDonnell made her professional wrestling debut in her native hometown of Preston promotion Pro Championship Wrestling at PCW PCW Vs. PCW Academy Show, a house show promoted on 25 June 2016, where she teamed up with Iestyn Rees to defeat Jennie B and Jimmy J. During her two-year tenure with the promotion, McDonnell won the PCW Women's Championship on two separate occasions.

=== NXT UK (2019) ===
McDonnell briefly competed for WWE's NXT UK branch as indie developmental talent. She made her only appearance at WWE NXT UK #47 on 14 June 2019, where she competed in a number one contendership battle royal for the NXT UK Women's Championship won by Kay Lee Ray and also involving Candy Floss, Isla Dawn, Jazzy Gabert, Jinny, Kanji, Killer Kelly, Nina Samuels, Piper Niven, Rhea Ripley and Xia Brookside.

=== Pro-Wrestling: EVE (2021–present) ===
McDonnell made her debut in Pro-Wrestling: EVE at EVE Aim To Misbehave on 4 December 2021, where she fell short to Laura Di Matteo. She rapidly moved to the title scene. At EVE Fuck It, We're Going Out on 8 January 2022, she competed in two round-robin bouts, first successfully against Chantal Jordan, then coming short secondly to Emersyn Jayne in a bout disputed for the latter's Pro-Wrestling: EVE Championship.

McDonnell has competed multiple times in the "SHE-1" tournament, one of the promotion's signature events. She made her first SHE-1 appearance in 2022 where she placed herself in Block A and scored a total of two points after competing against Alex Windsor, Skye Smitson and Veny. At the 2023 edition, she fell short to Nina Samuels in the first rounds.

McDonnell won the Pro-Wrestling: EVE Championship in a match against the previous champion Nyla Rose at EVE 141: Elite Encounters on 7 November 2025.

=== Progress Wrestling (2021–present) ===
McDonnell is best known for her tenure with Progress Wrestling. She made her debut in the promotion at PROGRESS Chapter 124: Cakehorn on 16 October 2021, where she defeated Lana Austin in the first rounds of the "Revelations Of Divine Love" tournament. She continued her work at PROGRESS Chapter 126: Behold The Turtle on 27 November 2021, where she defeated Skye Smitson in the second rounds of the competition. Rhio won the tournament at PROGRESS Chapter 127: And The Word Was PROGRESS... on 23 January 2022, where she defeated Mercedes Blaze in the finals. The victory in the tournament earned her a shot to the Progress Wrestling World Women's Championship which occurred at PROGRESS Chapter 128: Technique on 6 February 2022, where she fell short to reigning champion Gisele Shaw. After several more unsuccessful attempts of seizing it' McDonnell eventually emerged victorious at Progress Chapter 158: The Long Halloween on 22 October 2023, where she defeated Lana Austin to win the women's title.

=== Tokyo Joshi Pro-Wrestling (2024) ===
McDonnell made two brief excursions to the Japanese independent scene where she made several appearances in Tokyo Joshi Pro-Wrestling. She made her debut at TJPW Spring Tour '22 on 29 May 2022, where she defeated Yuki Aino. At TJPW City Circuit ~ Hamamatsu Performance on 4 June 2022, she unsuccessfully challenged Maki Itoh for the International Princess Championship. McDonnell made her second excursion to Japan in the last quarter of 2022 as she returned to the promotion at TJPW City Circuit ~ Hamamatsu Performance on 10 December 2022, where she unsuccessfully challenged Yuu for the Pro-Wrestling: EVE International Championship. She concluded her excursion at TJPW Angel And Rabbit on 15 December 2022, where she teamed up with Maki Itoh to defeat Moka Miyamoto and Yuki Arai.

McDonnell made her return to TJPW at TJPW Live In Philly on 5 April 2024, where she fell short to Shoko Nakajima in singles competition.

=== Revolution Pro Wrestling (2023–present) ===
McDonnell made her first appearance in Revolution Pro Wrestling at RevPro 11th Anniversary Show on 26 August 2023, where she competed in a 10-woman Battle Royal to determine the #1 contender to the Undisputed British Women's Championship, bout won by Dani Luna and also involving Safire Reed, Alexxis Falcon, Maya Matthews, Skye Smitson, Mercedez Blaze, Chantal Jordan, Rayne Leverkusen and Skye Blue. At RevPro/CMLL Fantastica Mania UK 2024 on 19 May, McDonnell unsuccessfully challenged Stephanie Vaquer for the Strong Women's Championship.

== Championships and accomplishments ==
- 4th Rope Wrestling
  - 4th Rope Women's Championship (1 time, inaugural, current)
- Insane Championship Wrestling
  - ICW World Heavyweight Championship (1 time)
  - ICW Women's Championship (1 time)
  - Square Go! (2025)
- Progress Wrestling
  - Progress Wrestling World Women's Championship (3 times, current)
  - Super Strong Style 16 (2026 Women's)
- Pro-Wrestling: EVE
  - Pro-Wrestling: EVE Championship (1 time)
  - Pro-Wrestling: EVE Tag Team Championship (1 time) – with Emersyn Jayne
- Pro Wrestling Illustrated
  - Ranked No. 204 of the top 500 singles wrestlers in the PWI 500 of 2026
  - Ranked No. 25 of the top 250 female wrestlers in the PWI Women's 250 in 2024
