= Progress Wrestling =

British professional wrestling promotion

- The Progress Wrestling logo
- Acronym: Progress
- Founded: 2011
- Style: Professional wrestling Sports entertainment
- Headquarters: London, England
- Founder(s): Jim Smallman; Jon Briley
- Owner(s): Damian Mackle; Nicola Glencross
- Website: ProgressWrestling.com

Progress Wrestling (stylized in all caps as PROGRESS) is a British professional wrestling promotion that was established in 2011 by comedian Jim Smallman, events and comedy promoter Jon Briley, and later, actor Glen Robinson (professionally known as Glen Joseph). Since 2026, the company has been co-owned by Damian Mackle (known as Big Damo) and Nicola Glencross (known as Nikki Storm).

== History ==
Progress Wrestling logo used from 2011 to 2020

Progress was conceived by Jim Smallman and Jon Briley in 2011, who were both wrestling fans. Smallman is a fan of "strong style" wrestling, Japanese in particular, and Briley was Smallman's agent.

In 2015, Progress appeared for five nights at Download Festival. In December of that year, they began running regular shows at The Ritz in Manchester. On 30 September 2018, Progress Wrestling held "Hello Wembley" at Wembley Arena. Billed by the promotion as the largest independent wrestling show in England for 30 years, the event drew 4,750 people; making it the most attended event in Progress Wrestling history.

In 2016, the company began working relationships with other promotions. At Chapter 29 on 24 April in London, Progress hosted two qualifying matches for the WWE Cruiserweight Classic. In 2017, Progress wrestlers such as Pete Dunne, Tyler Bate, Trent Seven, and Mark Andrews participated in the WWE United Kingdom Championship Tournament, culminating in Bate being crowned the first ever WWE UK Champion.

Smallman left Progress at the end of 2019 after Chapter 100. In June 2020, Progress reacted to reports of sexual harassment in the British independent circuit. After several accusations had been circulating of behaviour at other wrestling promotions, Progress decided to no longer work with David Starr, Travis Banks, and El Ligero, as well as suspending indefinitely then- Tag team Champions Jordan Devlin and Scotty Davis, who vacated the titles. Ring announcer and creative team member Matt Richards also left the promotion. On 21 June 2020, it was announced that Glen Joseph was stepping down with Michael Oku, Vicky Haskins and James Amner all taking prominent roles in the company. By the time the company returned to running shows, only James Amner would remain involved, and Amner played a key part in the future ownership of the company.

In 2021, Progress announced its return amidst the COVID-19 pandemic, travelling to South London to set up a temporary home at Theatre Peckham for Chapter 104: Natural Progression on 20 February, eventually producing 23 shows behind closed doors which featured on the WWE Network. On 31 December that year, ahead of their return to live shows in January 2022, it was announced that Progress had been acquired by Lee McAteer and Martyn Best - taking over ownership from Briley.

On 9 February 2024, it was announced that PROGRESS Wrestling would merge with DEFY Wrestling, an independent promotion based in Seattle, Washington in the United States. It was created to bring a "global presence" to both brands and aid further expansion plans.

On 26 May 2026, it was announced that both PROGRESS Wrestling and DEFY Wrestling were both purchased by Big Damo and Nikki Storm. Three months later, Damo and Storm sold DEFY back to the original founders.

== Demand Progress Plus ==
Demand Progress Plus is Progress' video-on-demand service that launched in 2023, replacing the previous service on Pivotshare.

January 2017 had seen the first episode of Freedom's Road, a new series from Progress which would feature matches taped specifically for the show and have a heavy focus on characters and plots.

== Current champions ==
As of November 10, 2026.

| Championship | Current champion(s) | Reign | Date won | Days held | Location | Notes | Ref. |
|---|---|---|---|---|---|---|---|
| Progress Men's World Championship | Cara Noir | 3 | 27 September 2026 | 44+ | Camden, London, England | Defeated Malakai Black at Chapter 198: When September Ends. | |
| Progress Women's World Championship | Rhio | 3 | 26 July 2026 | 107+ | London, England | Defeated Alexxis Falcon at Chapter 196: Scorchio. | |
| Progress Atlas Championship | Tommy Tanner | 1 | 31 August 2026 | 71+ | Camden, London, England | Defeated previous champion Gene Munny, Donovan Dijak, and Sha Samuels in a four-way match at Chapter 197: Wrestling Over Everything. | |
| Progress Proteus Championship | Dijak | 1 | 25 October 2026 | 16+ | Camden, London, England | Defeated Paul Walter Hauser at Chapter 199: Bonestorm. | |
| Progress World Tag Team Championship | Diamond Eyes (Connor Mills and Nico Angelo) | 2 | 31 August 2026 | 71+ | Camden, London, England | Defeated The 0121 (Drilla Moloney and Man Like DeReiss) at Chapter 197: Wrestling Over Everything. | |

== Reception ==
Patrick Lennon, wrestling journalist for the Daily Star, has attended and reviewed Progress shows.

Carrie Dunn, founder and main contributor of wrestling blog "The Only Way is Suplex", published the book Spandex, Screw Jobs & Cheap Pops: Inside the Business of British Pro Wrestling. Progress Wrestling features frequently in the book including opening a chapter regarding London based wrestling promotions.

== See also ==
- List of major Progress Wrestling events
- List of Progress Wrestling tournaments
- NXT UK - Brand of the U.S-based WWE from which several Progress talent have competed for.
