= Progress Chapter 194: Super Strong Style 16 Tournament Edition 2026 =

2026 Progress Wrestling event

Chapter 194: Super Strong Style 16 Tournament Edition 2026
- Promotional poster of the event
- Promotion: Progress Wrestling
- Date: Night One: May 3, 2026; Night Two: May 4, 2026
- City: London, England
- Venue: Electric Ballroom

Event chronology
← Previous; Chapter 193: Progress Las Vegas II	Next → Chapter 195: Wonderbrawl II

Super Strong Style 16 chronology
← Previous; 2025	Next → —

The Chapter 194: Super Strong Style 16 Tournament Edition 2026 was a two-night professional wrestling pay-per-view event produced by Progress Wrestling, which took place on May 3 and 4, 2026, in London, England, at the Electric Ballroom. It featured the final stages of the ninth Super Strong Style 16 tournament.

== Production ==
=== Storylines ===
The event included matches that each resulted from scripted storylines, where wrestlers portrayed heroes, villains, or less distinguishable characters in scripted events that built tension and culminated in a wrestling match or series of matches. Results were predetermined by Progress' creative writers, while storylines were produced on Progress' events airing on the Demand PROGRESS streaming service.

The 2026 edition of the competition featured the first-ever women's tournament. Both of the tournament's first round bouts were held under the "blockbuster" type of matches and took place both inside and outside of Progress events.

== Results ==
Night 1 (May 3)
No.	Results	Stipulations	Times
1	Jay Joshua defeated Simon Miller by referee stoppage	Quarterfinals match in the Men's Super Strong Style 16 tournament	7:12
2	Rhio defeated Stephanie Maze by pinfall	Quarterfinals match in the Women's Super Strong Style 16 tournament	12:29
3	Charles Crowley defeated Elijah Blum by pinfall	Quarterfinals match in the Men's Super Strong Style 16 tournament	9:34
4	Shotzi Blackheart defeated LA Taylor (with Skye Smitson) by pinfall	Quarterfinals match in the Women's Super Strong Style 16 tournament	8:53
5	Spike Trivet defeated Peter Tihanyi by pinfall	Quarterfinals match in the Men's Super Strong Style 16 tournament	10:39
6	Gisele Shaw defeated Skye Smitson (with LA Taylor) by pinfall	Quarterfinals match in the Women's Super Strong Style 16 tournament	7:56
7	Charlie Sterling defeated "Blackheart" Lio Rush by pinfall	Quarterfinals match in the Men's Super Strong Style 16 tournament	11:20
8	Kanji defeated Hollie Barlow (Note: Emersyn Jayne was originally scheduled to compete against Kanji but pulled out due to injury. Hollie Barlow, who Jayne defeated in the first round, forced the owners of PROGRESS Wrestling to put her in the quarterfinals as Jayne's replacement.) by submission	Quarterfinals match in the Women's Super Strong Style 16 tournament	13:50
9	Cara Noir defeated Man Like DeReiss (c) by pinfall	No Disqualification match for the PROGRESS World Championship	31:45
(c) / – the champion(s) heading into the match

Night 2 (May 4)
No.	Results	Stipulations	Times
1^{P}	Connor Mills defeated Mark Trew	UWF Rules match	—
2	Rhio defeated Shotzi Blackheart by pinfall	Semifinals match in the Women's Super Strong Style 16 tournament	15:11
3	Charles Crowley defeated Jay Joshua by pinfall	Semifinals match in the Men's Super Strong Style 16 tournament	8:59
4	Gisele Shaw defeated Kanji by pinfall	Semifinals match in the Women's Super Strong Style 16 tournament	17:50
5	Charlie Sterling defeated Spike Trivet by pinfall	Semifinals match in the Men's Super Strong Style 16 tournament	11:21
6	Gene Munny (c) (with Kouga and Session Moth Martina) defeated Jerry Bakewell by pinfall	Open Challenge for the Progress Atlas Championship	12:39
7	The Experience (Skye Smitson and LA Taylor) defeated Hollie Barlow and Stephanie Maze by pinfall	Tag team match	7:41
8	"Blackheart" Lio Rush defeated Peter Tihanyi, Simon Miller, and Elijah Blum by pinfall	Four-way match	11:30
9	Charles Crowley defeated Charlie Sterling by pinfall	Men's Super Strong Style 16 tournament final	18:53
10	Rhio defeated Gisele Shaw by pinfall	Women's Super Strong Style 16 tournament final	12:59
(c) / – the champion(s) heading into the match; P / – the match was broadcast on the pre-show

=== Super Strong Style 16 Men's Tournament ===
1st Round
Chapter 189: In Darkest Night (25 January)
Kid Lykos II	11:09
Jay Joshua	Forfeit
Chapter 190: In Brightest Day (15 February)
Simon Miller	Pinfall
Josh Holly	9:32
wXw We Love Wrestling (10 January)
Elijah Blum	Pinfall
Bobby Gunns	14:39
Rixe x BZW Fan Pass VII (14 March)
Tucker	—
Charles Crowley	Pinfall
SAJ Grandeur Warped (14 March)
Spike Trivet	Pinfall
Mirko Mori	12:21
wXw We Love Wrestling #72 (17 January)
Peter Tihanyi	Pinfall
Zoltan	8:41
Chapter 193: Progress Las Vegas II (16 April)
"Blackheart" Lio Rush	Pinfall
Ethan Allen	10:09
OTT Paddy's Day Bash (14 March)
Charlie Sterling	Pinfall
Cian Noonan	—

Quarterfinals; Chapter 194: Super Strong Style 16; Night 1; 3 May 2026
Jay Joshua	Referee stoppage
Simon Miller	7:12
Elijah Blum	9:34
Charles Crowley	Pinfall
Spike Trivet	Pinfall
Peter Tihanyi	10:39
"Blackheart" Lio Rush	11:20
Charlie Sterling	Pinfall

Semifinals; Chapter 194: Super Strong Style 16; Night 2; 4 May 2026
Jay Joshua	8:59
Charles Crowley	Pinfall
Spike Trivet	11:21
Charlie Sterling	Pinfall

Final; Chapter 194: Super Strong Style 16; Night 2; 4 May 2026
Charles Crowley	Pinfall
Charlie Sterling	18:53

=== Super Strong Style 16 Women's Tournament ===
1st Round
Chapter 191: For The Love Of Progress 4 (20 February)
Lana Austin	9:31
Shotzi Blackheart	Pinfall
Chapter 189: In Darkest Night (25 January)
LA Taylor	Pinfall
Session Moth Martina	7:46
wXw Dead End (21 February)
Maddy Morgan	6:41
Stephanie Maze	Pinfall
Chapter 193: Progress Las Vegas II (14 April)
Vert Vixen	10:59
Rhio	Pinfall
SAJ Evil Eye (31 January)
Kanji	Pinfall
Irene	—
Chapter 192: Cause & Effect (29 March)
Hollie Barlow	0:50
Emersyn Jayne	Pinfall
Gisele Shaw	Bye (Note: The scheduled first round match between Gisele Shaw and Billie Starkz was cancelled due to Starkz being unavailable. Shaw received a first round bye to advance to the quarterfinals.)
Billie Starkz	—
Chapter 189: In Darkest Night (25 January)
Anita Vaughan	7:26
Skye Smitson	Pinfall

Quarterfinals; Chapter 194: Super Strong Style 16; Night 1; 3 May 2026
Shotzi Blackheart	Pinfall
LA Taylor	8:53
Stephanie Maze	12:29
Rhio	Pinfall
Kanji	Submission
Hollie Barlow	13:50
Gisele Shaw	Pinfall
Skye Smitson	7:56

Semifinals; Chapter 194: Super Strong Style 16; Night 2; 4 May 2026
Shotzi Blackheart	15:11
Rhio	Pinfall
Kanji	17:50
Gisele Shaw	Pinfall

Final; Chapter 194: Super Strong Style 16; Night 2; 4 May 2026
Rhio	Pinfall
Gisele Shaw	12:59
