= Progress Chapter 190: In Brightest Day =

2026 Progress Wrestling event

Chapter 190: In Brightest Day
- Promotional poster of the event
- Promotion: Progress Wrestling
- Date: 15 February 2026
- City: London, England
- Venue: Electric Ballroom

Event chronology
← Previous; Chapter 189: In Darkest Night	Next → Chapter 191: For The Love Of Progress 4

Progress Chapter 190: In Brightest Day was a professional wrestling event produced by Progress Wrestling. It took place on 15 February 2026, in London, England, at the Electric Ballroom.

Eight matches were contested at the event. In the main event, Alexxis Falcon defeated Rhio to retain the Progress World Women's Championship. In another prominent match, Gene Munny defeated Saxon Huxley to win the Progress Atlas Championship.

== Production ==
=== Storylines ===
The event included matches that each resulted from scripted storylines, where wrestlers portrayed heroes, villains, or less distinguishable characters in scripted events that built tension and culminated in a wrestling match or series of matches. Results were predetermined by Progress' creative writers, while storylines were produced on Progress' events airing on the Demand PROGRESS streaming service.

=== Event ===
The event started with the singles confrontation between Matty Morgan and Aluna, solded with the victory of the latter. Next up, Charles Crowley picked up a victory over Drew Parker who was revealed as the mystery opponent on the night of the event. The third bout saw Simon Miller defeat Josh Holly in the first rounds of the Super Strong Style 16 tournament. In the fourth match, Gene Munny defeated Saxon Huxley to win the Progress Atlas Championship, ending the latter's reign at 45 days and one defense. Next up, Kid Lykos and Kid Lykos II defeated Man Like DeReiss and Michael Oku in tag team competition. The sixth bout saw Bullit outmatching Spike Trivet in singles competition. In the semi main event, Connor Mills and Nico Angelo defeated Sunshine Machine (Chuck Mambo and TK Cooper) to secure the third consecutive defense of the Progress Tag Team Championship in that respective reign.

In the main event, Alexxis Falcon defeated Rhio to secure the first successful defense of the Progress World Women's Championship in that respective reign.

== Results ==
No.	Results	Stipulations	Times
1^{D}	Aluna defeated Maddy Morgan by pinfall	Singles match	—
2	Charles Crowley defeated Drew Parker by pinfall	Singles match	7:56
3	Simon Miller defeated Josh Holly by pinfall	First round match in the Men's Super Strong Style 16 tournament	9:32
4	Gene Munny (with Kouga) defeated Saxon Huxley (c) (with Session Moth Martina) by pinfall	Singles match for the Progress Atlas Championship	11:16
5	Lykos Gym (Kid Lykos and Kid Lykos II) defeated Man Like DeReiss and Michael Oku (with Amira) by pinfall	Tag team match	14:54
6	Bullit defeated Spike Trivet by pinfall	Singles match	9:22
7	Diamond Eyes (Connor Mills and Nico Angelo) (c) defeated Sunshine Machine (Chuck Mambo and TK Cooper) by pinfall	Tag team match for the Progress Tag Team Championship	11:25
8	Alexxis Falcon (c) defeated Rhio by pinfall	Singles match for the Progress World Women's Championship	21:34
(c) / – the champion(s) heading into the match; D / – this was a dark match
