= Progress Chapter 178: Fix Your Hearts =

2025 Progress Wrestling event

Chapter 178: Fix Your Hearts
- Promotional poster of the event
- Promotion: Progress Wrestling
- Date: 30 March 2025
- City: London, England
- Venue: Electric Ballroom
- Attendance: cca. 700

Event chronology
← Previous; Chapter 177: My Own Destiny	Next → Chapter 179: Progress Las Vegas

The Chapter 178: Fix Your Hearts was a professional wrestling event produced by Progress Wrestling. It took place on 30 March 2025 in London, England, at the Electric Ballroom.

The event's name and aesthetics are in reference and tribute to the late David Lynch (who had died earlier that year) and his most well-known production, Twin Peaks.

Eight matches were contested at the event. The main event saw Sunshine Machine (Chuck Mambo and TK Cooper) defeat Smokin' Aces (Charlie Sterling and Nick Riley) to win the PROGRESS Tag Team Championship.

== Production ==
=== Storylines ===
The event included matches that each resulted from scripted storylines, where wrestlers portrayed heroes, villains, or less distinguishable characters in scripted events that built tension and culminated in a wrestling match or series of matches. Results were predetermined by Progress' creative writers, while storylines were produced on Progress' events airing on the Demand PROGRESS streaming service.

=== Event ===
The event started with the singles confrontation between Myles Kayman and Michael Oku solded with the victory of the latter. Next up, Simon Miller defeated Gene Munny in a Dog House Rules match to secure the seventh consecutive defense of the Progress Proteus Championship in that respective reign. In the third bout, Nina Samuels picked up a victory over Millie McKenzie in singles competition. Next up, Lykos Gym (Kid Lykos and Kid Lykos II) defeated Connor Mills and Nico Angelo in a No Ropes "I Quit" match. The fifth bout saw Tate Mayfairs defeat Eddie Dennis in a Last Man Standing match. Next up, Charles Crowley defeated Session Moth Martina in another singles bout. In the main event, Cara Noir defeated Trent Seven in singles action.

In the main event, Sunshine Machine (Chuck Mambo and TK Cooper) defeated Smokin' Aces (Charlie Sterling and Nick Riley) to win the PROGRESS Tag Team Championship, ending the latter teams' reign at 189 days and four defenses, and forcing Smokin' Aces to disband as a team.

== Results ==
No.	Results	Stipulations	Times
1	Michael Oku defeated Myles Kayman by submission	Singles match	9:27
2	Simon Miller (c) defeated Gene Munny by pinfall	Dog House Rules match for the Progress Proteus Championship	11:04
3	Nina Samuels defeated Millie McKenzie by pinfall	Singles match	8:22
4	Lykos Gym (Kid Lykos and Kid Lykos II) defeated Connor Mills and Nico Angelo	No Ropes "I Quit" match	18:47
5	Tate Mayfairs defeated Eddie Dennis	Last Man Standing match	21:12
6	Charles Crowley defeated Session Moth Martina by pinfall	Singles match	5:09
7	Cara Noir defeated Trent Seven by submission	Singles match	23:08
8	Sunshine Machine (Chuck Mambo and TK Cooper) defeated Smokin' Aces (Charlie Sterling and Nick Riley) (c) by pinfall	Tag team match for the PROGRESS Tag Team Championship; Since Smokin' Aces lost, they were forced to disband. Had Sunshine Machine lost, they would have never been allowed challenge for the PROGRESS Tag Team Championship ever again.	21:57
(c) / – the champion(s) heading into the match
