= Progress Chapter 177: My Own Destiny =

2025 Progress Wrestling event

Chapter 177: My Own Destiny
- Promotional poster of the event
- Promotion: Progress Wrestling
- Date: 23 February 2025
- City: London, England
- Venue: Electric Ballroom
- Attendance: cca. 600

Event chronology
| ← Previous; Chapter 176: For The Love of Progress 3 | Next → Chapter 178: Fix Your Hearts |

The Chapter 177: My Own Destiny was a professional wrestling event produced by Progress Wrestling. It took place on 23 February 2025 in London, England, at the Electric Ballroom.

Nine matches were contested at the event. The main event saw Meiko Satomura defeat Rhio in one of the former's last matches during her retirement tour.

== Production ==
=== Storylines ===
The event included matches that each resulted from scripted storylines, where wrestlers portrayed heroes, villains, or less distinguishable characters in scripted events that built tension and culminated in a wrestling match or series of matches. Results were predetermined by Progress' creative writers, while storylines were produced on Progress' events airing on the Demand PROGRESS streaming service.

=== Event ===
The event started with the tag team confrontation between Axel Tischer and Big Damo, and Sunshine Machine (Chuck Mambo and TK Cooper), which Sunshine Machine won. Next up, Nico Angelo defeated Kid Lykos II by way of disqualification in singles competition. The third match saw Simon Miller picking up a victory over Will Kroos to secure the fifth consecutive defense of the Progress Proteus Championship in that respective reign. Next up, Man Like DeReiss defeated Myles Kayman in singles competition. The fifth match saw Luke Jacobs defeat Tate Mayfairs in a No Disqualification match to secure the tenth consecutive defense of the PROGRESS World Championship in that respective reign. Next up, Rayne Leverkusen defeated Session Moth Martina, Lana Austin and Alexxis Falcon to become the number one contender for the Progress Women's Championship in a match which occurred in the very next bout where she fell short to reigning champion Nina Samuels. In the semi-main event, Smokin' Aces (Charlie Sterling and Nick Riley) defeated Aigle Blanc and Kuro to secure the fourth consecutive defense of the PROGRESS Tag Team Championship in that respective reign.

In the main event, Meiko Satomura defeated Rhio in singles competition. The bout was part of Satomura's retirement road which represented the last series of matches before her retirement which occurred later that year.

== Results ==
| No. | Results | Stipulations | Times |
|---|---|---|---|
| 1 | Sunshine Machine (Chuck Mambo and TK Cooper) defeated Sanity (Axel Tischer and Big Damo) by pinfall | Tag team match | 9:40 |
| 2 | Nico Angelo defeated Kid Lykos II by disqualification | Singles match | 7:01 |
| 3 | Simon Miller (c) defeated Will Kroos (with Session Moth Martina and Gene Munny) by pinfall | Singles match for the Progress Proteus Championship | 5:41 |
| 4 | Man Like DeReiss defeated Myles Kayman by pinfall | Singles match | 8:34 |
| 5 | Luke Jacobs (c) defeated Tate Mayfairs by pinfall | No Disqualification match for the PROGRESS World Championship | 27:52 |
| 6 | Rayne Leverkusen defeated Session Moth Martina (with Gene Munny and Will Kroos), Lana Austin and Alexxis Falcon by submission | Four-way match to determine the #1 contender to the Progress Women's Championship | 12:44 |
| 7 | Nina Samuels (c) defeated Rayne Leverkusen by pinfall | Singles match for the Progress Women's Championship | 0:38 |
| 8 | Smokin' Aces (Charlie Sterling and Nick Riley) (c) defeated Aigle Blanc and Kuro by pinfall | Tag team match for the PROGRESS Tag Team Championship | 11:04 |
| 9 | Meiko Satomura defeated Rhio by pinfall | Singles match | 14:50 |
(c) / – the champion(s) heading into the match
