= Progress Chapter 195: Wonderbrawl II =

2026 Progress Wrestling event

Chapter 195: Wonderbrawl II
- Promotional poster of the event
- Promotion: Progress Wrestling
- Date: 7 June 2026
- City: Manchester, England
- Venue: The O_{2} Ritz
- Attendance: ca. 600

Event chronology
← Previous; Chapter 194: Super Strong Style 16 Tournament Edition 2026	Next → Chapter 196: Scorchio

The Chapter 195: Wonderbrawl II was a professional wrestling event produced by Progress Wrestling. It took place on 7 June 2026 in Manchester, England, at The O_{2} Ritz.

Eight matches were contested at the event. In the main event, The 0121 (Drilla Moloney and Man Like DeReiss) defeated Young Guns (Ethan Allen and Luke Jacobs) to win the Progress Tag Team Championship.

== Production ==
=== Storylines ===
The event included matches that each resulted from scripted storylines, where wrestlers portrayed heroes, villains, or less distinguishable characters in scripted events that built tension and culminated in a wrestling match or series of matches. Results were predetermined by Progress' creative writers, while storylines were produced on Progress' events airing on the Demand PROGRESS streaming service.

=== Event ===
The event started with the singles confrontation between Charles Crowley and Scott Oberman, solded with the victory of the former. Next up, Lana Austin and Hollie Barlow picked up a victory over Skye Smitson and LA Taylor in tag team competition. In the third bout, Nico Angelo outmatched Thom Thelwell in singles competition. Next up, Gene Munny defeated Kouga to secure the third consecutive defense of the Progress Atlas Championship in that respective reign. The fifth bout saw Cian Noonan defeat Daz Black in singles competition. Next up, Simon Miller defeated Nathan Black in another singles bout. In the semi main event, Raven Creed picked up a victory over Melissa Fierce in singles competition.

In the main event, Drilla Moloney and Man Like DeReiss defeated Ethan Allen and Luke Jacobs to win the Progress Tag Team Championship, ending the champion team's reign at 70 days and no defenses.

== Results ==
No.	Results	Stipulations	Times
1	Charles Crowley defeated Scott Oberman by pinfall	Singles match	9:13
2	Lallie (Lana Austin and Hollie Barlow) defeated The Experience (Skye Smitson and LA Taylor) by pinfall	Tag team match	9:29
3	Nico Angelo defeated Thom Thelwell by pinfall	Singles match	6:54
4	Gene Munny (c) (with Session Moth Martina) defeated Kouga by pinfall	Singles match for the Progress Atlas Championship	11:31
5	Cian Noonan defeated Daz Black by pinfall	Singles match	10:57
6	Simon Miller defeated Nathan Black by pinfall	Singles match	7:08
7	Raven Creed defeated Melissa Fierce by pinfall	Singles match	7:52
8	The 0121 (Drilla Moloney and Man Like DeReiss) defeated Young Guns (Ethan Allen and Luke Jacobs) (c) by pinfall	Tag team match for the Progress Tag Team Championship	22:57
(c) / – the champion(s) heading into the match
