= Will Kroos =

English professional wrestler (born 1996)

Mason Rook
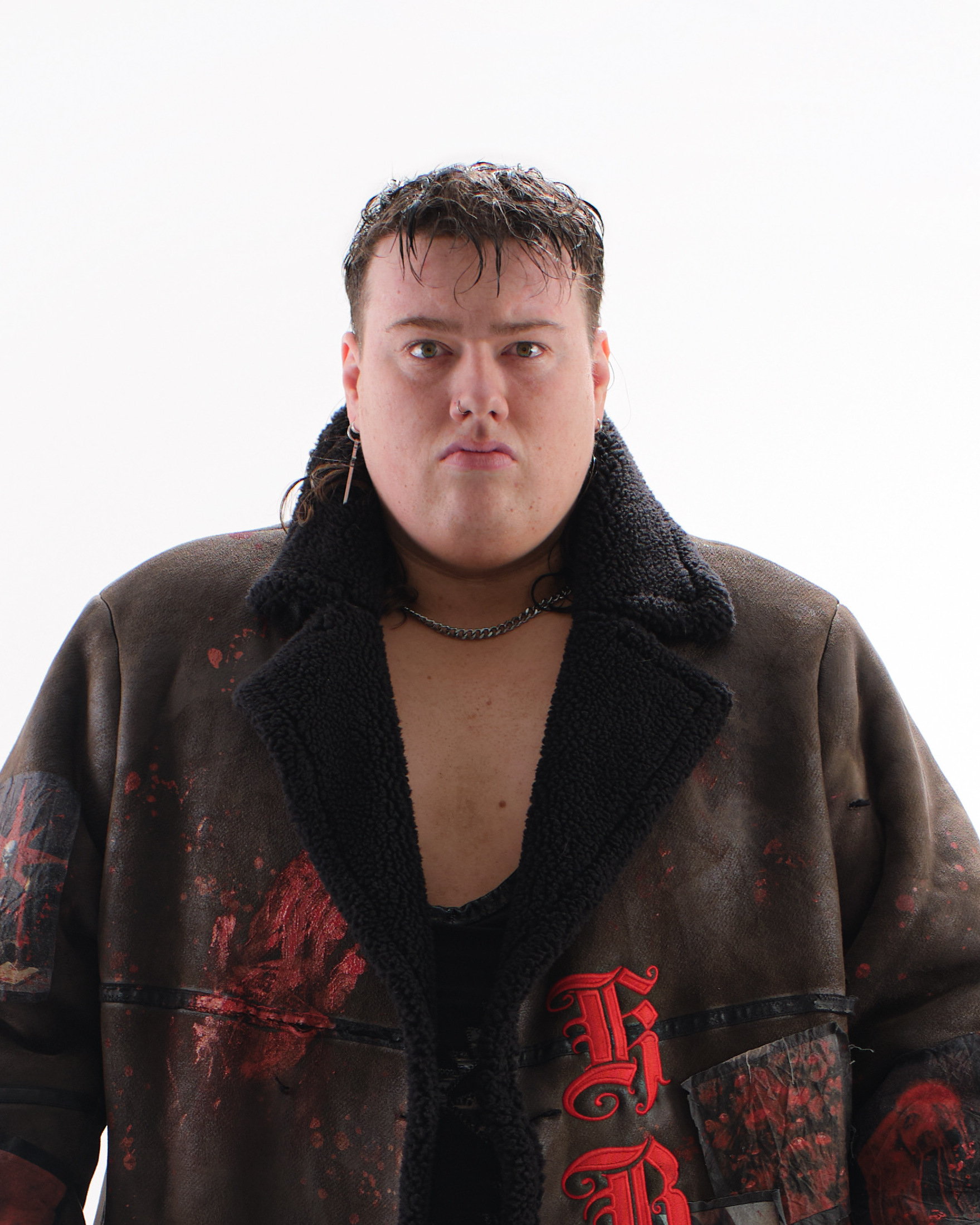
- Rook in March 2025

Personal information
- Born: 28 October 1996 (age 30) Worksop, England

Professional wrestling career
- Ring names: Will Kroos; Mason Rook
- Billed height: 193 cm (6 ft 4 in)
- Billed weight: 185 kg (408 lb)
- Trained by: FFW Wrestling Academy; Hayden "Dutch" Loeve; Rampage Brown
- Debut: 2017

William Parmar Walker (born 28 October 1996) is an English professional wrestler. He is signed to WWE, where he performs on the NXT brand under the ring name Mason Rook.

Walker is known for his time on the British independent scene, notably Progress Wrestling, where he performed under the ring name Will Kroos, and is a former Progress Atlas Champion. He has also made appearances in Japan with Pro Wrestling Noah.

== Professional wrestling career ==
=== Training and early career (2017) ===
Walker began training to become a professional wrestler at Fight Factory Wrestling (FFW) in Lincoln, Lincolnshire being trained by Hayden "Dutch" Loeve appearing as a student wrestler in their Academy prior to making his professional debut in 2017 under the name Will Kroos. He competed for the FFW Academy Championship against Magic Myers at Origins in January 2017. Kroos is recognized by the company as one of the leading graduates of its academy system.

=== British independent circuit (2017–2026) ===
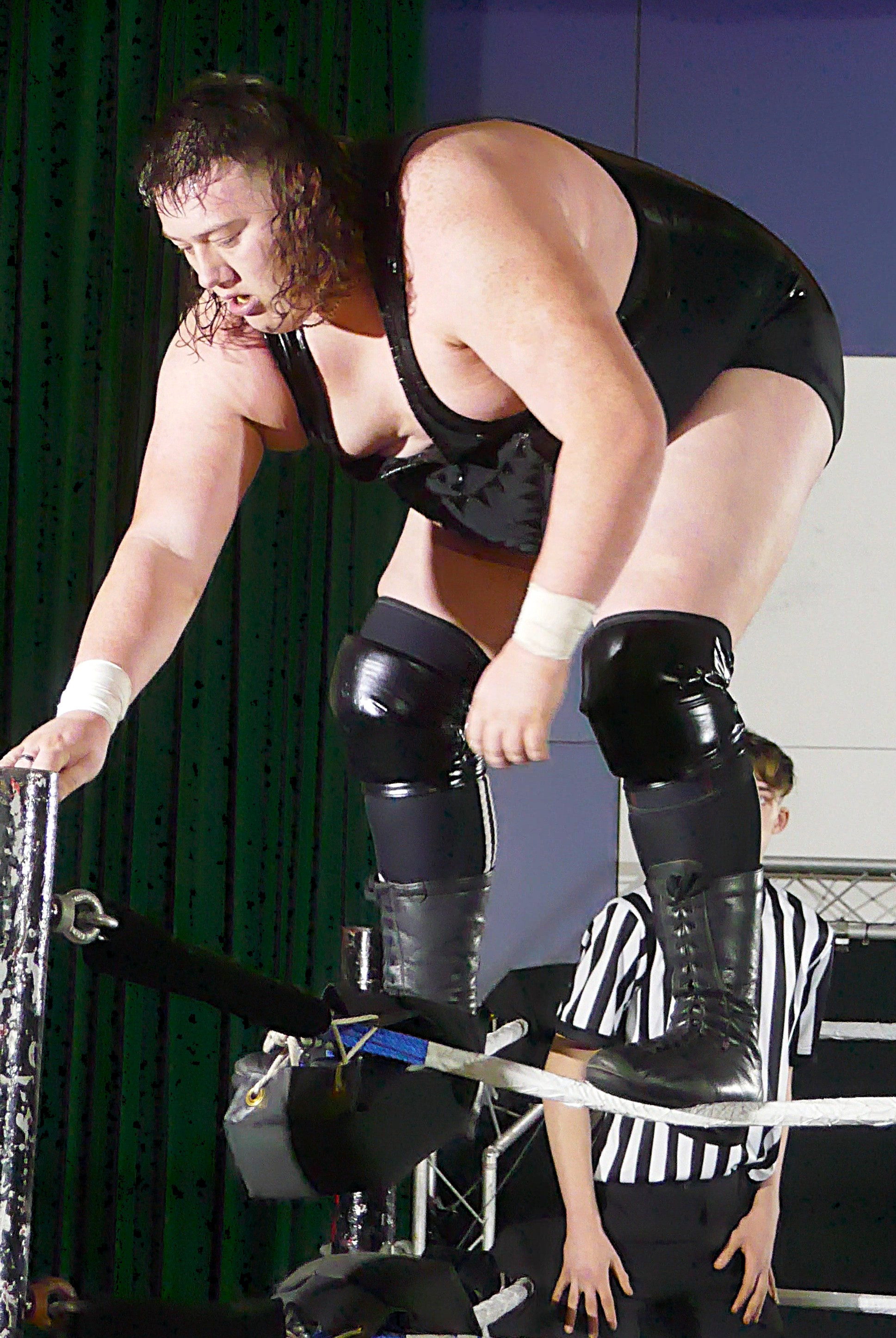
Kroos in March 2025

Kroos made his professional wrestling debut at Evolution 47: You And Me In British Racing Green, an event promoted by Hope Wrestling on May 26, 2017, where he defeated Shogun J in singles competition. Kroos debuted as a heel in the indepentent scene. Kroos competed regularly for Fight Factory Wrestling (FFW) during the early years of his career. Among his earliest notable matches were contests against Joey Ozbourne and Nick Aldis in 2017. During his time with FFW, Kroos became a one-time FFW Heavyweight Champion. Kroos is known for his tenure with various promotions from the British independent scene such as Preston City Wrestling (PCW), Pro Wrestling Chaos (PWC), Insane Championship Wrestling (ICW) and many others.

At RevPro Unfinished Business 2022 on May 1, Kroos teamed up with Blake as "Pure Beef" to unsuccessfully challenge Sunshine Machine (Chuck Mambo and TK Cooper) for the British Tag Team Championship. At RevPro Summer Sizzler 2022 on July 23, Kroos competed in a six-way scramble to determine the number one contender for All Elite Wrestling's AEW All-Atlantic Championship won by Connor Mills and also involving Callum Newman, Man Like DeReiss, Ricky Knight Jr. and Robbie X.

Kroos' final independent date took place on April 12, 2026 at RevPro Epic Encounter, where he unsuccessfully challenged Jay Joshua for the Undisputed British Heavyweight Championship.

=== Progress Wrestling (2022–2026) ===
Kroos made his debut in Progress Wrestling at Chapter 132: By The Beard Of Zeus on April 17, 2022, where he unsuccessfully challenged Rickey Shane Page and Joe Hendry in a first round match of a tournament for the reactivated Progress Atlas Championship.

At Chapter 175: Unboxing VII: The Curtain Call on December 29, 2024, Kroos teamed up with "Mothdog" stable partner Gene Munny to unsuccessfully challenge reigning champions Smokin' Aces (Charlie Sterling and Nick Riley) and Simon Miller and Jerry Bakewell in a three-way tag team bout disputed for the Progress Tag Team Championship. At Chapter 177: My Own Destiny on February 23, 2025, Kroos unsuccessfully challenged Simon Miller for the Progress Proteus Championship. At Chapter 183: Hundred Volts on August 25, 2025, he took part in a three-way match where Gene Munny defeated reigning champion Mike D Vecchio and Kroos the Progress Atlas Championship. Kroos won the title one month later at Chapter 184: Camden Lock Up on September 28, 2025 by defeating Munny in singles competition before losing it in Japan in Pro Wrestling Noah on January 1, 2026 to Saxon Huxley.

During his time with the promotion, he chased for various accomplishments. In the 2025 edition of the Super Strong Style 16, he defeated Marcus Mathers in the first rounds, only to fall short to Charlie Sterling in the second ones.

=== Pro Wrestling Noah (2024–2026) ===
Kroos often wrestled in events promoted by Pro Wrestling Noah due to the latter promotion's business relationship with British scene talent. He made his first appearance on the first night of the Noah UK Tour on September 6, 2024, where he fell short to Yoshiki Inamura.

Kroos made his debut in a Noah pay-per-view in Japan at Sunny Voyage 2025 on July 13, where he unsuccessfully challenged Galeno for the GHC National Championship. On the first night of New Departure 2025 from July 19, 2025, where he teamed up with Shuhei Taniguchi and Hajime Ohara in a losing effort against Los Golpeadores (Alpha Wolf and Dragon Bane) and Super Crazy. On the second night of the event from July 20, he teamed up with Kazuyuki Fujita and Daiki Odashima in a losing effort against Ratel's (Manabu Soya, Daiki Inaba and Saxon Huxley). On January 1, 2026 at Noah The New Year 2026, Kroos lost his Progress Atlas Championship to Huxley.

=== WWE (2026–present) ===
Walker made his WWE debut on the 28 April 2026 edition of NXT, attacking NXT Champion Tony D'Angelo and adopting the ring name Mason Rook soon after. Rook made his WWE in-ring debut on the 19 May episode of NXT, teaming with Kam Hendrix to defeat D'Angelo and Myles Borne, with Hendrix stealing the pinfall for the win. Later on in the show, Rook confronted Hendrix during an in-ring interview as he had taken exception to Hendrix’s actions during the match, and attacked Hendrix after he insulted Rook. On the 9 June episode of NXT, Rook suffered his first loss in WWE as he was defeated by Naraku in an NXT Championship No. 1 contender's match after interference from Hendrix. After losing two straight singles matches to The Vanity Project’s Jackson Drake on the 30 June episode of NXT, and Kam Hendrix on the 11 August episode of NXT, Rook picked up his first singles victory by defeating Hendrix in a rematch on the 1 September episode of NXT. On the 8 September episode of NXT, Rook, Saquon Shugars, and Tony D'Angelo defeated Cruz Montana, EK Prosper, and Keanu Carver in a Six-Man Tag Team match to qualify for the NXT Championship No. 1 contender's Triple Threat match the following week, which was won by Rook. However, on the 29 September episode of NXT, the night Rook was scheduled to face NXT Champion Grayson Waller for the title, it was reported that Rook had not been medically cleared to compete and would be out for the “foreseeable future”. Rook returned on the 10 November episode of NXT during an in-ring segment between Waller and Shiloh Hill, where Rook and Hill attacked Waller.

== Championships and accomplishments ==
- British Wrestling Revolution
  - BWR Heavyweight Championship (1 time)
  - BWR Underground Championship (1 time)
- Fight Factory Wrestling
  - FFW Heavyweight Championship (1 time)
- North Wrestling
  - North Tag Team Championship (1 time) – with Rampage Brown
- Preston City Wrestling
  - PCW Heavyweight Championship (1 time)
  - PCW Tag Team Championship (1 time) – with Iestyn Rees
  - Road To Glory Tournament (2020)
- Pro Wrestling Chaos
  - Knights Of Chaos Championship (1 time) – with Martin Kirby
- Pro Wrestling Illustrated
  - Ranked No. 262 of the top singles wrestlers in the PWI 500 in 2026
- Progress Wrestling
  - Progress Atlas Championship (1 time)
- Rise Underground Pro Wrestling
  - Rise Hardcore Championship (1 time)
- Tidal Wrestling
  - Tidal Championship (2 times)
- World War Wrestling
  - WWW Heavyweight Championship (1 time)
