= Progress Chapter 192: Cause & Effect =

2026 Progress Wrestling event

Chapter 192: Cause & Effect
- Promotional poster of the event
- Promotion: Progress Wrestling
- Date: 29 March 2026
- City: London, England
- Venue: Electric Ballroom
- Tagline: Every Action Has A Consequence

Event chronology
← Previous; Chapter 191: For The Love Of Progress 4	Next → Chapter 193: Progress Las Vegas II

Progress Chapter 192: Cause & Effect was a professional wrestling pay-per-view event produced by Progress Wrestling. It took place on 29 March 2026, in London, England, at the Electric Ballroom and was streamed live on Triller TV.

Eight matches were contested at the event. In the main event, Man Like DeReiss defeated Kid Lykos to retain the PROGRESS World Championship.

== Production ==
=== Storylines ===
The event included matches that each resulted from scripted storylines, where wrestlers portrayed heroes, villains, or less distinguishable characters in scripted events that built tension and culminated in a wrestling match or series of matches. Results were predetermined by Progress' creative writers, while storylines were produced on Progress' events airing on the Demand PROGRESS streaming service.

=== Event ===
The event started with the singles comfrontation between Kouga and Kid Lykos II, solded with the victory of the latter. Next up, Spike Trivet picked up a victory over Charlie Sterling in another singles bout. The third match saw Emersyn Jayne defeat Hollie Barlow in the first rounds of the 2026 Women's Super Strong Style 16 tournament. Next up, Gene Munny defeated Nathan Black in an open challenge for the Progress Atlas Championship to secure the first successful defense of the title in that respective reign. The fifth bout saw Charles Crowley defeat Cara Noir in singles competition. Next up, Ethan Allen and Luke Jacobs defeated Jay Joshua and Nico Angelo to win the Progress Tag Team Championship. Joshua substituted lineal champion Connor Mills in the title defense. Mills and Angelo's title reign ended at 154 days and three defenses. In the semi main event, Alexxis Falcon defeated Mercedes Martinez to secure the second consecutive defense of the Progress World Women's Championship in that respective reign.

In the main event, Man Like DeReiss defeated Kid Lykos to secure the twelfth consecutive defense of the PROGRESS World Championship in that respective reign.

== Results ==
No.	Results	Stipulations	Times
1	Kid Lykos II defeated Kouga by pinfall	Singles match	—
2	Spike Trivet defeated Charlie Sterling by pinfall	Singles match	7:24
3	Emersyn Jayne defeated Hollie Barlow (with Lana Austin) by pinfall	First round match in the Women's Super Strong Style 16 tournament	0:50
4	Gene Munny (c) (with Session Moth Martina and Kouga) defeated Nathan Black by pinfall	Open Challenge for the Progress Atlas Championship	9:39
5	Charles Crowley defeated Cara Noir by pinfall	Singles match	13:15
6	Young Guns (Ethan Allen and Luke Jacobs) defeated Diamond Eyes (Jay Joshua (Note: Replaced Connor Mills in the title defense without being recognized as champion.) and Nico Angelo) (c) by pinfall	Tag team match for the Progress Tag Team Championship	19:04
7	Alexxis Falcon (c) defeated Mercedes Martinez by pinfall	Singles match for the Progress World Women's Championship	12:24
8	Man Like DeReiss (c) defeated Kid Lykos by submission	Singles match for the PROGRESS World Championship	16:03
(c) / – the champion(s) heading into the match
