= Progress Chapter 183: Hundred Volts =

2025 Progress Wrestling event

Chapter 183: Hundred Volts
- Promotional poster of the event
- Promotion: Progress Wrestling
- Date: 25 August 2025
- City: London, England
- Venue: Electric Ballroom
- Attendance: cca. 700

Event chronology
← Previous; Chapter 182: Stay Humble	Next → Chapter 184: Camden Lock Up

The Chapter 183: Hundred Volts was a professional wrestling event produced by Progress Wrestling. It took place on 25 August 2025 in London, England, at the Electric Ballroom.

Eight matches were contested at the event. The main event saw Man Like DeReiss defeat Luke Jacobs in a Tables, Ladders, and Chairs match to win the PROGRESS World Championship.

== Production ==
=== Storylines ===
The event included matches that each resulted from scripted storylines, where wrestlers portrayed heroes, villains, or less distinguishable characters in scripted events that built tension and culminated in a wrestling match or series of matches. Results were predetermined by Progress' creative writers, while storylines were produced on Progress' events airing on the Demand PROGRESS streaming service.

=== Event ===
The event started with the three-way confrontation for the Progress Atlas Championship won by Gene Munny who defeated previous champion Mike D Vecchio and Will Kroos, ending Vecchio's reign at 29 days and no defenses. Next up, Alexxis Falcon picked up a victory over Lana Austin in singles competition. The third bout saw Paul Walter Hauser defeat Simon Miller, Charles Crowley and Bullit to secure the second consecutive defense of the Progress Proteus Championship in that respective reign. Next up, Rhio defeated Kanji to secure the third consecutive defense of the Progress World Women's Championship in that respective reign. In the fifth bout, Ricky Knight Jr. defeated Cara Noir in singles competition. In the sixth bout, Kid Lykos and Kid Lykos II defeated Sunshine Machine (Chuck Mambo and TK Cooper) to secure the first defense of the PROGRESS Tag Team Championship in that respective reign. In the semi main event, Charlie Sterling picked up a victory over Owadasan in singles competition.

In the main event, Man Like DeReiss defeated Luke Jacobs to win the PROGRESS World Championship, ending the latter's reign at 393 days and 13 defenses.

== Results ==
No.	Results	Stipulations	Times
1	Gene Munny (with Session Moth Martina) defeated Mike D Vecchio (c) and Will Kroos by pinfall	Three-way match for the Progress Atlas Championship	13:43
2	Alexxis Falcon defeated Lana Austin (with Hollie Barlow) by pinfall	Singles match	10:14
3	Paul Walter Hauser (c) defeated Simon Miller, Charles Crowley and Bullit by pinfall	Four-way Fans Bring the Weapons match for the Progress Proteus Championship	13:04
4	Rhio (c) defeated Kanji by referee stoppage	Singles match for the Progress World Women's Championship	23:57
5	Ricky Knight Jr. defeated Cara Noir by pinfall	Singles match	20:19
6	Lykos Gym (Kid Lykos and Kid Lykos II) (c) defeated Sunshine Machine (Chuck Mambo and TK Cooper) by pinfall	Tag team match for the PROGRESS Tag Team Championship	15:08
7	Charlie Sterling defeated Owadasan by pinfall	Singles match	5:47
8	Man Like DeReiss defeated Luke Jacobs (c)	Tables, Ladders, and Chairs match for the PROGRESS World Championship	35:06
(c) / – the champion(s) heading into the match
