= Progress Chapter 197: Wrestling Over Everything =

2026 Progress Wrestling event

Chapter 197: Wrestling Over Everything
- Promotional poster
- Promotion: Progress Wrestling
- Date: 31 August 2026
- City: Camden, London, England
- Venue: Electric Ballroom
- Attendance: ca. 800

Event chronology
← Previous; Chapter 196: Scorchio	Next → Chapter 198: When September Ends

Progress Chapter 197: Wrestling Over Everything was a professional wrestling event produced by Progress Wrestling. It took place on 31 August 2026, at the Electric Ballroom in Camden, London, England.

Nine matches were contested at the event. In the main event, Cara Noir defeated Spike Trivet to retain the Progress World Championship. In other prominent matches, Diamond Eyes (Connor Mills and Nico Angelo) defeated The 0121 (Dan Moloney and Man Like DeReiss) to win the Progress Tag Team Championship, Tommy Tanner defeated Gene Munny, Donovan Dijak, and Sha Samuels in a four-way match to win the Progress Atlas Championship, and Rhio defeated Lio Rush in an Intergender No Disqualification match.

== Production ==
=== Storylines ===
The event included matches that each resulted from scripted storylines, where wrestlers portrayed heroes, villains, or less distinguishable characters in scripted events that built tension and culminated in a wrestling match or series of matches. Results were predetermined by Progress' creative writers, while storylines were produced on Progress' events airing on the Demand PROGRESS streaming service.

=== Event ===
The event started with the singles confrontation between Luke Jacobs and Trent Seven, solded with the victory of the latter. Next up, Alexxis Falcon and Myla Grace picked up a victory over Anita Vaughan and Safire Reed in tag team competition. The third bout saw Kouga outmatch Mark Coffey in singles competition. Next up, Nikki Storm defeated Frankie B in another singles bout. The fifth match portrayed Connor Mills and Nico Angelo picking up a victory over Dan Moloney and Man Like DeReiss to win the Progress Tag Team Championship, ending the latter team's reign at 85 days and no defenses. Next up, Tommy Tanner defeated reigning champion Gene Munny, Donovan Dijak, and Sha Samuels to win the Progress Atlas Championship, ending Munny's reign at 197 days and four defenses. Next up, Rhio defeated Lio Rush in an intergender bout. In the semi main event, Scotty Rawk defeated Luke Menzies in singles competition.

In the main event, Cara Noir defeated Spike Trivet to secure the second consecutive defense of the Progress World Championship in that respective reign.

== Results ==
No.	Results	Stipulations	Times
1	Trent Seven defeated Luke Jacobs by pinfall	Singles match	12:20
2	Alexxis Falcon and Myla Grace defeated Hyperactive (Anita Vaughan and Safire Reed) by pinfall	Tag team match	—
3	Kouga (with Gene Munny and Session Moth Martina) defeated Mark Coffey by pinfall	Singles match	—
4	Nikki Storm defeated Frankie B by pinfall	Singles match	—
5	Diamond Eyes (Connor Mills and Nico Angelo) defeated The 0121 (Dan Moloney and Man Like DeReiss) (c) by pinfall	Tag team match for the Progress Tag Team Championship	23:42
6	Tommy Tanner defeated Gene Munny (c) (with Kouga and Session Moth Martina), Donovan Dijak and Sha Samuels by pinfall	Four-way match for the Progress Atlas Championship	—
7	Rhio defeated Lio Rush by pinfall (Note: This was originally a standard singles match, but it ended in a no contest. It was restarted as a No Disqualification match.)	Intergender No Disqualification match	—
8	Scotty Rawk defeated Luke Menzies by pinfall	Singles match	—
9	Cara Noir (c) defeated Spike Trivet by pinfall	Singles match for the Progress World Championship	—
(c) / – the champion(s) heading into the match
