= Progress Chapter 191: For The Love Of Progress 4 =

2026 Progress Wrestling event

Chapter 191: For The Love of Progress 4
- Promotional poster of the event
- Promotion: Progress Wrestling
- Date: 20 February 2026
- City: Manchester, England
- Venue: BEC Arena

Event chronology
← Previous; Chapter 190: In Brightest Day	Next → Chapter 192: Cause & Effect

Progress Chapter 191: For The Love Of Progress 4 was a professional wrestling pay-per-view event produced by Progress Wrestling. It took place on 20 February 2026, in Manchester, England, at the BEC Arena.

Six matches were contested at the event. In the main event, Charles Crowley, Man Like DeReiss, Simon Miller, and Charles Crowley defeated Saxon Huxley, Bullit, and Jack Morris.

== Production ==
=== Storylines ===
The event included matches that each resulted from scripted storylines, where wrestlers portrayed heroes, villains, or less distinguishable characters in scripted events that built tension and culminated in a wrestling match or series of matches. Results were predetermined by Progress' creative writers, while storylines were produced on Progress' events airing on the Demand PROGRESS streaming service.

=== Event ===
The event started with the tag team confrontation between Axel Tischer and Big Damo, and Ethan Allen and Luke Jacobs, with the latters becoming number one contenders for the Progress Tag Team Championship. Next up, Sam Bailey picked up a victory over Kouga in singles competition. The third bout saw Session Moth Martina defeat Melissa Fierce to win the PWC Ladies Championship, a title promoted by Pro Wrestling Cyprus (PWC). Next up, Kid Lykos defeated Spike Trivet in singles competition. The fifth bout saw Shotzi Blackheart defeat Lana Austin to advance in the women's Super Strong Style 16 tournament.

In the main event, Charles Crowley, Man Like DeReiss and Simon Miller outmatched Bullit, Jack Morris and Saxon Huxley in six-man tag team competition.

== Results ==
No.	Results	Stipulations	Times
1	Young Guns (Ethan Allen and Luke Jacobs) defeated SAnitY (Axel Tischer and Big Damo) by pinfall	Tag team to determine the #1 contenders to the Progress Tag Team Championship	6:36
2	Sam Bailey defeated Kouga by pinfall	Singles match	6:31
3	Session Moth Martina (with Kouga) defeated Melissa Fierce (c) by pinfall	Singles match for the PWC Ladies Championship	6:30
4	Kid Lykos defeated Spike Trivet by pinfall	Singles match	13:27
5	Shotzi Blackheart defeated Lana Austin (with Hollie Barlow) by pinfall	First round match in the Women's Super Strong Style 16 tournament	9:31
6	Man Like DeReiss, Simon Miller, and Charles Crowley defeated Saxon Huxley, Bullit, and Jack Morris by pinfall	Six-man tag team match	12:39
(c) / – the champion(s) heading into the match
