= Fight Factory Wrestling =

British professional wrestling promotion and academy

- Acronym: FFW
- Founded: 2013
- Style: Professional wrestling
- Headquarters: Lincoln, Lincolnshire, England
- Founder: Hayden “Dutch” Loeve
- Owner(s): Hayden “Dutch” Loeve; Rebecca Loeve
- Website: www.fightfactorywrestling.com

Fight Factory Wrestling (commonly abbreviated to FFW) is a British professional wrestling promotion and training school based in Lincoln, Lincolnshire, England. The promotion was founded in 2013 by Hayden "Dutch" Loeve and Rebecca Loeve.

The promotion operates live wrestling events throughout Lincolnshire and also runs the FFW Wrestling Academy in Lincoln.

== History ==
Fight Factory Wrestling was originally formed in September 2013 by Hayden and Rebecca Loeve as a Wrestling academy. During its early development, the promotion worked alongside veteran British wrestling promoter Phil Fogg's long-running Royal Wrestling Promotions franchise while simultaneously establishing the Fight Factory Wrestling Academy in Lincoln.

The promotion developed from a small local wrestling school into a regular independent wrestling company hosting events across Lincolnshire. Fight Factory Wrestling has held shows at venues including The Engine Shed in Lincoln, ONE NK Leisure Centre in North Hykeham, and The Drill in Lincoln.

In 2023, Fight Factory Wrestling and its training academy were featured on BBC Look North as part of coverage surrounding the growth of professional wrestling in the United Kingdom ahead of All Elite Wrestling’s event at Wembley Stadium.

The promotion has also organised annual charity wrestling events under the BodySlams to Cancer banner. In 2023, the event raised £4,100 for cancer charities.

== Training academy ==
The FFW Wrestling Academy operates from the Fight Factory Pro Wrestling and Fitness Centre in Lincoln.

The academy provides professional wrestling training for adults and children aged eight and above. The school was training close to 40 students in 2024.

== Championships ==
Fight Factory Wrestling has featured several championships throughout its history, including:

- FFW Heavyweight Championship
- FFW Women's Championship
- FFW Tag Team Championship
- FFW Academy Championship

== Notable alumni and appearances ==
Wrestler	Image	Notes
Will Kroos		Trained at the FFW Academy and later became a former FFW Heavyweight Champion.
Nick Aldis		Competed for Fight Factory Wrestling during the promotion's early years, including matches against Will Kroos.
Lana Austin		Competed for Fight Factory Wrestling and held the FFW Women's Championship.
Wild Boar		Appeared at events including Fight For The Throne.
Robbie X		Competed in multiple events.
Scotty 2 Hotty		Appeared in 2015 as part of Too Cool.
Grand Master Sexay		Appeared in 2015 as part of Too Cool.
Kip Sabian		Competed for Fight Factory Wrestling in 2017, defeating Nick Aldis at FFW Triple Threat III: Gainsborough.
Zak Zodiac		Appeared at the 2022 WAW Vs. FFW event.
Ricky Knight Jr.		Appeared at the 2022 WAW Vs. FFW event with The Norfolk Killers.
Jonny Storm		Competed in 2025.
