= Progress Chapter 193: Progress Las Vegas II =

2026 Progress Wrestling event

Chapter 193: Progress Las Vegas II
- Promotional poster of the event
- Promotion: Progress Wrestling
- Date: 14 April 2026
- City: Paradise, Nevada
- Venue: Horseshoe Las Vegas

Event chronology
← Previous; Chapter 192: Cause & Effect	Next → Chapter 194: Super Strong Style 16 Tournament Edition 2026

Progress Chapter 193: Progress Las Vegas II was a professional wrestling pay-per-view event produced by Progress Wrestling. It took place on 16 April 2026 in Paradise, Nevada, at Horseshoe Las Vegas. The event was streamed live on Triller TV and was held in conjunction with Game Changer Wrestling's (GCW) Collective.

Seven matches were contested at the event. In the main event, Man Like DeReiss defeated Michael Oku to retain the PROGRESS World Championship.

== Production ==
=== Storylines ===
The event included matches that each resulted from scripted storylines, where wrestlers portrayed heroes, villains, or less distinguishable characters in scripted events that built tension and culminated in a wrestling match or series of matches. Results were predetermined by Progress' creative writers, while storylines were produced on Progress' events airing on the Demand PROGRESS streaming service.

=== Event ===
The event started with the tag team confrontation between Kuro and LJ Cleary, and Flash Morgan Webster and Mark Andrews, solded with the victory of the latters. Next up, Simon Miller picked up a victory over Danny Jones in singles competition. The third bout saw Lio Rush outmatch Ethan Allen in another singles competition bout. Next up, Emersyn Jayne defeated Lena Kross, Mercedes Martinez, Renee Michelle, Shotzi Blackheart in five-way competition. The fifth match saw Paul Walter Hauser defeat Big Damo to secure the fifth consecutive defense of the Progress Proteus Championship in that respective reign. In the semi main event, Rhio defeated Vert Vixen in the first rounds of the 2026 Women's Super Strong Style 16 tournament.

In the main event, Man Like DeReiss defeated Michael Oku to secure the fourteenth consecutive defense of the PROGRESS World Championship in that respective reign.

== Results ==
No.	Results	Stipulations	Times
1	Subculture (Mark Andrews and Flash Morgan Webster) defeated Kuro and LJ Cleary by pinfall	Tag team match	7:52
2	Simon Miller defeated Danny Jones by pinfall	Singles match	7:33
3	"Blackheart" Lio Rush defeated Ethan Allen by pinfall	First round match in the Men's Super Strong Style 16 tournament	10:09
4	Emersyn Jayne defeated Lena Kross, Mercedes Martinez, Renee Michelle, Shotzi Blackheart by pinfall	Five-way match	6:43
5	Paul Walter Hauser (c) defeated Big Damo by pinfall	$100,000 Challenge for the Progress Proteus Championship	6:47
6	Rhio defeated Vert Vixen by pinfall	First round match in the Women's Super Strong Style 16 tournament	10:59
7	Man Like DeReiss (c) defeated Michael Oku (with Amira Blair) by pinfall	Singles match for the PROGRESS World Championship	13:45
(c) / – the champion(s) heading into the match
