= Progress Chapter 184: Camden Lock Up =

2025 Progress Wrestling event

Chapter 184: Camden Lock Up
- Promotional poster of the event
- Promotion: Progress Wrestling
- Date: 28 September 2025
- City: London, England
- Venue: Electric Ballroom
- Attendance: cca. 600

Event chronology
← Previous; Chapter 183: Hundred Volts	Next → Chapter 185: Jump In The Line

The Chapter 184: Camden Lock Up was a professional wrestling event produced by Progress Wrestling. It took place on 28 September 2025 in London, England, at the Electric Ballroom.

Seven matches were contested at the event. The main event saw Kanji defeat Nina Samuels in a Loser Leaves Progress match, resulting in Samuels being forced to leave the promotion. In another prominent match, Will Kroos defeated Gene Munny to win the Progress Atlas Championship.

== Production ==
=== Storylines ===
The event included matches that each resulted from scripted storylines, where wrestlers portrayed heroes, villains, or less distinguishable characters in scripted events that built tension and culminated in a wrestling match or series of matches. Results were predetermined by Progress' creative writers, while storylines were produced on Progress' events airing on the Demand PROGRESS streaming service.

=== Event ===
The event started with the confrontation between Charlie Sterling and Man Like DeReiss, in which the latter successfully defended the PROGRESS World Championship for the third time consecutively in that respective reign. Next up, Simon Miller picked up a victory over Josh Holly in singles competition. The third bout saw Rhio defeat Lucy Sky to secure the fourth consecutive defense of the Progress World Women's Championship in that respective reign. Next up, Ricky Knight Jr. defeated Owadasan in singles competition. In the fifth bout, Will Kroos defeated Gene Munny to win the Progress Atlas Championship, ending the latter's reign at 34 days and no defenses. Next up, Cara Noir defeated Alexander Lockheart in singles competition.

In the main event, Kanji defeated Nina Samuels in a Loser Leaves Progress match, therefore, Samuels was forced to leave the promotion.

== Results ==
No.	Results	Stipulations	Times
1	Man Like DeReiss (c) defeated Charlie Sterling by submission	Singles match for the PROGRESS World Championship	14:44
2	Simon Miller defeated Josh Holly by pinfall	Singles match	0:36
3	Rhio (c) defeated Lucy Sky by pinfall	Singles match for the Progress World Women's Championship	12:01
4	Ricky Knight Jr. defeated Owadasan by pinfall	Singles match	4:54
5	Will Kroos defeated Gene Munny (with Session Moth Martina) (c) by pinfall	Singles match for the Progress Atlas Championship	9:33
6	Cara Noir defeated Alexander Lockheart by pinfall	Singles match	5:50
7	Kanji defeated Nina Samuels by submission	Loser Leaves Progress match	31:33
(c) / – the champion(s) heading into the match
