= Mike D Vecchio =

Belgian professional wrestler

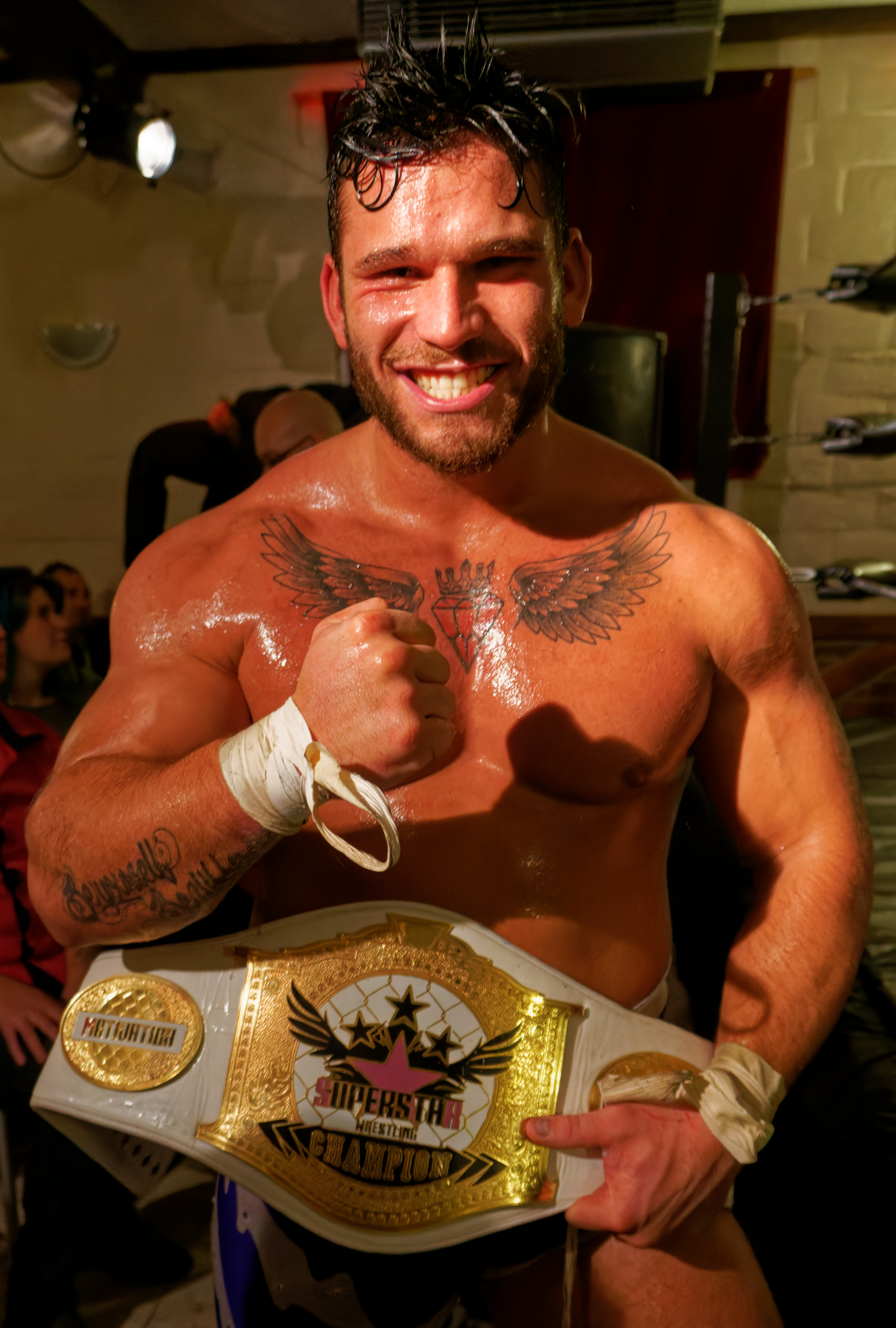
- Vecchio in November 2017

Personal information
- Born: 7 May 1996 (age 30) Mons, Belgium

Professional wrestling career
- Ring name: Belgian War Machine Mickael D Mickey D Mike D Mike Vecchio Mikey D Mike D. Vecchio Dorian Van Dux
- Billed height: 180 cm (5 ft 11 in)
- Billed weight: 110 kg (243 lb)
- Trained by: Pat Derudder
- Debut: 2013

Mike Derudder (born 7 May 1996), better known by his ring name Mike D Vecchio, is a Belgian professional wrestler. He is signed to WWE where he performs on the Evolve brand under the ring name Dorian Van Dux. He is best known for working in Westside Xtreme Wrestling (wXw), where he was a former one-time wXw European Champion. He is also known for his tenures with various promotions from the European independent scene.

== Professional wrestling career ==
=== German Wrestling Federation (2020–2025) ===
In the German Wrestling Federation, Derudder is a former GWF Berlin and World Champion, titles which he has won on one separate occasion each.

=== Westside Xtreme Wrestling (2021–2025) ===
Derudder made his debut in Westside Xtreme Wrestling at the wXw German Comic Con Limited Edition 2021 on 11 September, where he teamed up with Ultima Sombra in a losing effort against Tristan Archer and Michael Knight. During his time in the promotion, he chased for various of its championships. At wXw Drive Of Champions 2023 on 17 June, he unsuccessfully challenged Shigehiro Irie for the wXw Unified World Wrestling Championship. In 2024, he took part in the inaugural tournament of the wXw European Championship, where he defeated Jacob Crane in the first round and Luke Jacobs in the semifinals, but lost to Aigle Blanc in the finals. He eventually defeated Blanc to win the title on the second night of the 2024 of the WXw World Tag Team Festival. Derudder held the title until 20 May 2025 when he vacated it due to a knee injury.

Derudder competed in several signature events of the promotion. In 2023's Shortcut to the Top, he competed in the traditional battle royal for the number one contendership at the wXw Unified World Wrestling Championship, ultimately won by Maggot. At the 2024 edition of Shortcut to the Top, Derudder teamed up with Nick Schreier to unsuccessfully challenge Dennis Dullnig and Hektor Invictus for the wXw World Tag Team Championship. At the same event, he also competed in the traditional battle royal, which was won by Peter Tihanyi.

In the 16 Carat Gold Tournament, he made his first appearance at the 2023 edition, where he lost to Tristan Archer in the first round. One year later at the 2024 edition, Derudder defeated Gringo Loco in the first round, then lost to Aigle Blanc in the quarterfinals.

=== Progress Wrestling (2024–2025) ===
Derudder made his debut in Progress Wrestling at the 2024 Super Strong Style 16 tournament, where he lost to Luke Jacobs in the first round. On the second night of the event, he participated in a battle royal won by Gene Munny. At Progress Chapter 169: The Devil On My Shoulder on 28 July 2024, he unsuccessfully challenged Axel Tischer for the Progress Atlas Championship.

On 27 July 2025 he successfully defeated Axel Tischer in a Tables Match to capture the Progress Atlas Championship

=== Revolution Pro Wrestling (2024–2025) ===
Derudder often makes appearances in Revolution Pro Wrestling (RevPro). At RevPro Revolution Rumble 2024 on 31 March, he competed in the traditional Revolution Rumble won by Luke Jacobs.

=== Impact Wrestling (2023) ===
Derudder made a one-time appearance in Impact Wrestling as he competed at Turning Point on 27 October 2023, where he teamed up with Ryan Richards in a losing effort against Grado and Rhino.

=== World Wrestling Entertainment (2025-present) ===
Derudder announced his signing with WWE in September 2025 before being revealed as part of their next recruitment class in October. Derudder initially wrestled dark matches and house shows for WWE's NXT brand under his real name before being given his new ring name Dorian Van Dux.

His televised debut for WWE was on Evolve's 1 April episode defeating It's GAL. He then wrestled in a six-man tag team match on AAA's 4 April episode, teaming up with Elio LeFleur and Axiom to win against Charlie Dempsey, Nathan Frazer and Tristan Angels. His first televised NXT match was on 14 April episode, where he would lose to EK Prosper in the first round for the vacant Speed Championship. Derudder would team up with Sean Legacy in a fatal four-way match to be #1 contenders for the NXT Tag Team Championship, winning against OTM, Birthright, and DarkState. They would lose their title match against The Vanity Project.

== Championships and accomplishments ==
- Association les Professionnels du Catch
  - APC Championship (1 time)
- Catch As Catch Can
  - CACC Supreme Championship (1 time)
- European Wrestling Association
  - EWA Europameisterschaft Championship (1 time)
- Fédération Française de Catch Professionnel
  - FFCP Heavyweight Championship (1 time)
- Premium Championship Wrestling
  - Premium Cup (2023)
- German Wrestling Federation
  - GWF Berlin Championship (1 time)
  - GWF World Championship (1 time)
  - GWF Battlefield (2023)
- International Catch Wrestling Alliance
  - ICWA France Heavyweight Championship (1 time)
  - ICWA Heavyweight Championship (1 time)
- Progress Wrestling
  - Progress Atlas Championship (1 time)
- Pro Wrestling Illustrated
  - Ranked No. 180 of the top 500 singles wrestlers in the PWI 500 in 2025
- Superstar Wrestling
  - Superstar Wrestling Championship (3 times)
- Tigers Pro Wrestling
  - TPW Proud Championship (1 time)
- Wrestling Pro Essonne
  - WPE Spotlight Championship (1 time)
- Westside Xtreme Wrestling
  - wXw European Championship (1 time)
- WrestlingKULT
  - WrestlingKULT Championship (1 time)

== Other media ==
Derudder played Dracko in the 2024 martial arts film The Last Kumite directed by Ross W. Clarkson.
