= Charles Crowley (wrestler) =

English professional wrestler

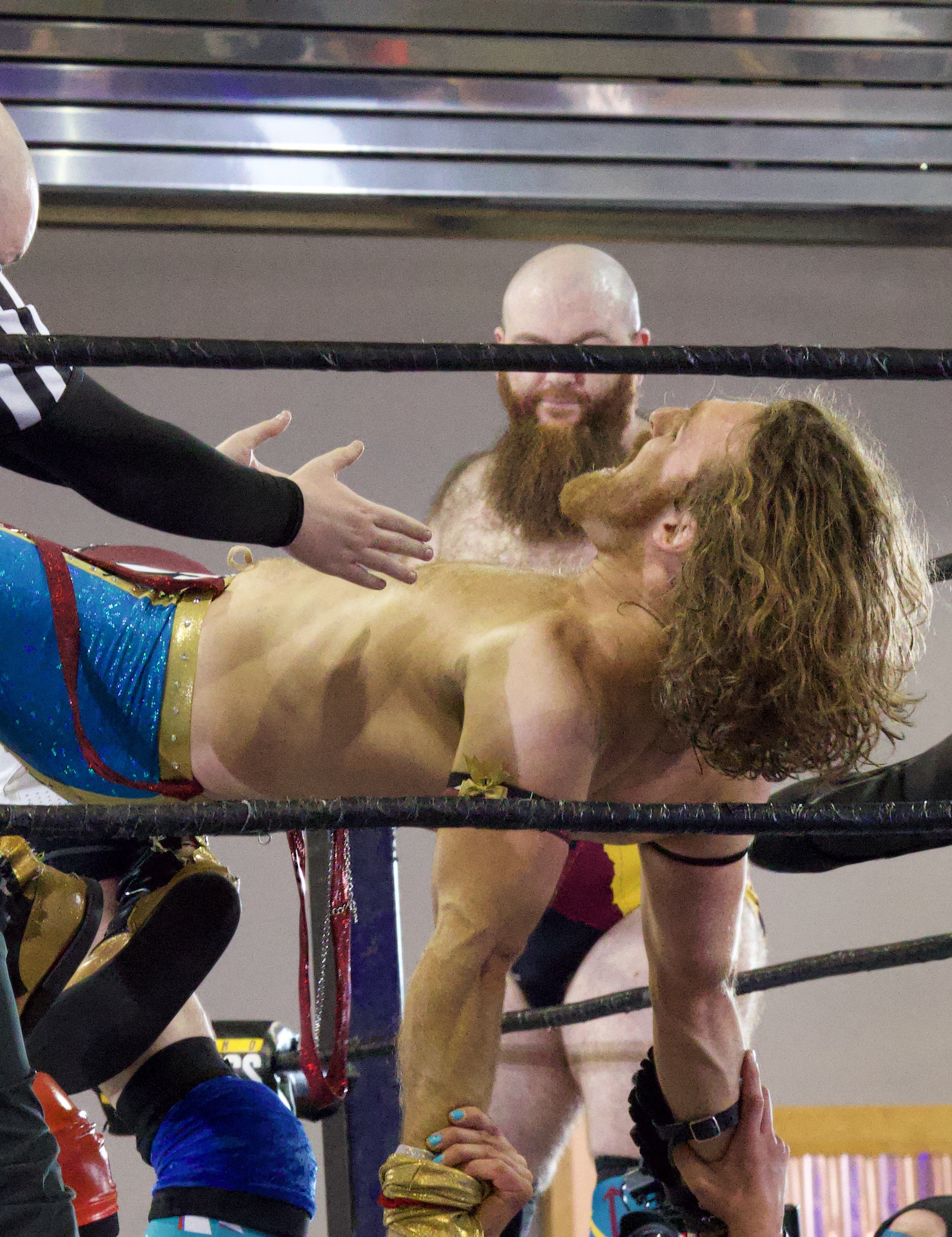
- Crowley in April 2024

Personal information
- Born: Richard Summers-Calvert; 4 August 1992 (age 34) Bedfordshire, England

Professional wrestling career
- Ring name: Mr. Charles Crowley Charles Crowley
- Billed height: 183 cm (6 ft 0 in)
- Billed weight: 91 kg (201 lb)
- Trained by: Ultimate British Wrestling; Paul Ashe & Knucklelocks
- Debut: 2018

Richard Summers-Calvert (born 4 August 1992), better known by his ring name Charles Crowley, is an English professional wrestler. He currently performs on the British and European independent circuit. Outside of professional wrestling, Summers-Calvert is a filmmaker, writer, and actor; he most notably performed in a voice acting role for the 2026 video game Star Wars: Galactic Racer as Biddy Blas.

== Professional wrestling career ==
=== British independent circuit (2018–present) ===
Summers-Calvert made his debut as Charles Crowley at UBW March To Victory, an event promoted by Ultimate British Wrestling (UBW) on March 4, 2018, where he teamed up with Jethro Roose and Marty Flux to defeat JK Roberts, Psycho From The Swamp and Sidney James in six-man tag team competition. Crowley won almost all the available championships in the promotion, the British Heavyweight, Young Lions and Tag Team titles. He is known for competing in various other promotions from the British scene such as Hope Wrestling, Riot Cabaret Pro Wrestling (RCPW) and TNT Extreme Wrestling (TNT). In the latter promotion, he is a former TNT World Champion, title which he won at TNT Merseyside Massacre on January 14, 2023, by defeating Leon Slater.

=== Progress Wrestling (2021–present) ===
Crowley is known for competing in Progress Wrestling's "Chapter" event series. He made his debut at Chapter 120: Total Protonic Reversals on September 4, 2021, where he teamed up with Elijah in a loing effort against The Young Guns (Ethan Allen and Luke Jacobs). At Chapter 157: Hungry Like The Wolf on September 24, 2023, he unsuccessfully challenged Blake Christian for the GCW World Championship.

During his time with the promotion, he chased for various championships. At Chapter 163: Twisted Metal on February 25, 2024, Crowley teamed up with his "Cheeky Little Buggers" tag team partner Alexxis Falcon to win the Progress Tag Team Championship by defeating Smokin' Aces (Charlie Sterling and Nick Riley). At Chapter 183: Hundred Volts on August 25, 2025, he unsuccessfully challenged Paul Walter Hauser for the Progress Proteus Championship in a fans bring weapons match also involving Simon Miller. At Chapter 185: Jump In The Line on October 26, 2025, he unsuccessfully challenged Will Kroos for the Progress Atlas Championship.

Crowley competed in several of the promotion's signature events. In the Super Strong Style 16, he made his debut at the 2022 edition of the tournament where he fell short to Charlie Dempsey in the first rounds. One year later at the 2023 edition, Crowley stepped upper into the competition as he made it to the semifinals where he fell short to Mark Haskins. Crowley scored his best result at the 2026 edition which he won by defeating Tucker in the first rounds, Elijah Blum in the quarterfinals, Jay Joshua in the semifinals, and Charlie Sterling in the finals.

== Other activities ==
In 2026, Summers-Calvert was cast in 2026 video game Star Wars: Galactic Racer as Biddy Blas, a racer pilot who taunts the player in an obnoxious voice. Following the game's release, the character gained significant popularity among players online. Fans described him as "the best Glup Shitto", an internet meme term referring to background characters, often with silly names. Summers-Calvert expressed that he was "overwhelmed and overstimulated" by how much the internet loved Biddy Blas.

== Filmography ==
=== Film ===
Key
†	Denotes films that have not yet been released

Year	Title	Role	Notes	Ref(s)
2014	Maleficent	Guard	Uncredited	
2020	Drive Me to the End	Ryan Jackson	Also director, producer	
2025	Affair of Honor	Grigory Smirnov		
2025	Welcome to Paradise	Charles	Also director, writer	
2026	Idiots Anonymous †	Shithead		

=== Television ===
Year	Title	Role	Notes	Ref(s)
2015	The Royals	Royal assistant		
2022	EastEnders	Dave	2 episodes	

=== Video games ===
Year	Title	Role	Notes	Ref(s)
2022	Total War: Warhammer III	Aekold Helbrass		
2026	007 First Light	Additional voices		
2026	Star Wars: Galactic Racer	Biddy Blas		
2026	Warhammer 40,000: Dark Heresy	Confessor Ercimus		

== Championships and accomplishments ==
- Pro Wrestling Illustrated
  - Ranked No. 296 of the top 500 singles wrestlers in the PWI 500 of 2026
- Progress Wrestling
  - Progress Tag Team Championship (1 time) – with Alexxis Falcon
  - Super Strong Style 16 (2026)
- Riot Cabaret Pro Wrestling
  - Riot Cabaret Championship (1 time, current)
  - Riot Cabaret Tag Team Championship (1 time) – with Session Moth Martina
- Rixe Catch
  - Rixe Championship (2 times)
- Shropshire Wrestling Alliance
  - SWA Championship (1 time)
- TNT Extreme Wrestling
  - TNT World Championship (1 time)
- Ultimate British Wrestling
  - UBW British Heavyweight Championship (1 time)
  - UBW Young Lions Championship (1 time)
  - UBW British Tag Team Championship (1 time) – with Wrestling Memes
- Wrestle Carnival
  - King Of The Carnival Championship (1 time)
- Wrestling Resurgence
  - Resurgence Tag Team Championship (1 time) – with Clementine
