= Progress Wrestling Atlas Championship =

Professional wrestling championship

Progress Atlas Championship
- The current Progress Atlas Championship belt design (2016–present)

Details
- Promotion: Progress Wrestling
- Date established: 25 March 2012
- Current champion: Tommy Tanner
- Date won: 31 August 2026
Statistics
- First champion: Rampage Brown
- Most reigns: Walter (3 reigns)
- Longest reign: Axel Tischer (426 days)
- Shortest reign: 29 days: Matt Riddle; Mike D Vecchio
- Oldest champion: Doug Williams (45 years, 261 days)
- Youngest champion: Luke Jacobs (21 years, 240 days)
- Heaviest champion: Big Damo (321 lb (146 kg))
- Lightest champion: Ricky Knight Jr. (189 lb (86 kg))

The Progress Atlas Championship is a professional wrestling championship created and promoted by the British professional wrestling promotion Progress Wrestling. Initially, the title was designated exclusively for wrestlers weighing over 205 pounds (the cruiserweight weight limit) in weight, but the rule was scrapped in time.

== Title history ==
Rampage Brown became the inaugural champion after winning a two-block round-robin tournament in 2016. On 27 February 2019, Progress Wrestling announced a unification match for the Progress Atlas Championship and the Progress World Championship at Night 2 of Chapter 88: Super Strong Style 16 on 5 May. The Progress World Champion Walter defeated Progress Atlas Champion Trent Seven to unify the two titles. On 21 July at Chapter 95: Still Chasing, Progress Wrestling replaced the Progress Atlas Championship with the Progress Proteus Championship, officially retiring the title. Three years later, the title was reactivated and an 8-man tournament was held to crown the new champion. The tournament was won by Luke Jacobs.

=== Inaugural championship tournament ===
This round-robin tournament was held to crown the inaugural Progress Atlas Champion. It used a two-block system with the two participants with the most points each block advancing to the semifinals. For the block matches, two points were awarded for a win and one point for a time-limit draw. The tournament began at Chapter 28: Please, Please, Please, Let Me Get What I Want on 10 April 2016 and ended at Chapter 36: We're Gonna Need a Bigger Room... Again on 25 September. The tournament was won by Rampage Brown.

Tournament

Matches

Legend
Block A match
Block B match
Semifinal match
Tournament final match

Tournament matches
Dates	Show	Venue	Matches		Time
10 April	Chapter 28: Please, Please, Please, Let Me Get What I Want	O_{2} Ritz; Manchester, England	A	T-Bone defeated Big Daddy Walter	9:45
24 April	Chapter 29: Practically PROGRESS In Every Way	Electric Ballroom; Camden Town, London, England	B	Michael Dante defeated Damian O'Connor	6:56
24 April	Chapter 29: Practically PROGRESS In Every Way	Electric Ballroom; Camden Town, London, England	B	Joe Coffey vs. Rampage Brown ended in a time-limit draw	15:00
15 May	ENDVR:16	The Garage; Highbury, London, England	A	T-Bone defeated Iestyn Rees	9:35
May 29	Chapter 30: Super Strong Style 16 Tournament Edition 2016; Night 1	Electric Ballroom; Camden Town, London, England	A	Big Daddy Walter defeated Dave Mastiff	11:13
19 June	Chapter 31: All Hail The New Puritans	O_{2} Ritz; Manchester, England	B	Damian O'Connor and Joe Coffey defeated Mikey Whiplash (Note: Mikey Whiplash replaced Michael Dante.) and Rampage Brown	7:22
26 June	Chapter 32: 5000 To 1	Electric Ballroom; Camden Town, London, England	B	Rampage Brown defeated Damian O'Connor by forfeit	—N/a
26 June	Chapter 32: 5000 To 1	Electric Ballroom; Camden Town, London, England	A	T-Bone and Zack Gibson (Note: Zack Gibson replaced Dave Mastiff.) defeated Big Daddy Walter and Iestyn Rees	9:56
14 August	Chapter 34: Keep It Unreal	O_{2} Ritz; Manchester, England	A	Dave Mastiff defeated Iestyn Rees	6:33
14 August	Chapter 34: Keep It Unreal	O_{2} Ritz; Manchester, England	B	Joe Coffey defeated Michael Dante	9:23
28 August	Chapter 35: Writing Nirvana On Other People's Bags	Electric Ballroom; Camden Town, London, England	SF	Joe Coffey defeated Dave Mastiff	9:24
28 August	Chapter 35: Writing Nirvana On Other People's Bags	Electric Ballroom; Camden Town, London, England	SF	Rampage Brown defeated T-Bone	9:46
25 September	Chapter 36: We're Gonna Need A Bigger Room ... Again	O_{2} Brixton Academy; London, England	F	Rampage Brown defeated Joe Coffey	13:53

Blocks
Wrestler qualified to playoffs
Wrestler won the match (2 points)
Match ended in a time-limit draw (1 point)
Wrestler lost the match (0 points)

Block A participants
Block A
#	Wrestler	Score
1	T-Bone	6
2	Dave Mastiff	4
3	Big Daddy Walter	2
4	Iestyn Rees	0

Block A bracket
Block A	Singles opponent				Tag team match (9:56)
Block A	T-Bone	Walter	Rees	Mastiff	Tag team match (9:56)
T-Bone	—N/a	9:45	9:35	—N/a	T-Bone & Gibson
Walter	9:45	—N/a	—N/a	11:13	Walter & Rees
Rees	9:35	—N/a	—N/a	6:33	Walter & Rees
Mastiff	—N/a	11:13	6:33	—N/a	T-Bone & Gibson

Block B participants
Block B
#	Wrestler	Score
1	Joe Coffey	5
2	Rampage Brown	3
3	Michael Dante	2
4	Damian O'Connor	2

Block B bracket
Block B	Singles opponent				Tag team match (7:22)
Block B	Dante	O'Connor	Coffey	Brown	Tag team match (7:22)
Dante	—N/a	6:56	9:23	—N/a	Brown & Whiplash
O'Connor	6:56	—N/a	—N/a	Forfeit	O'Connor & Coffey
Coffey	9:23	—N/a	—N/a	15:00	O'Connor & Coffey
Brown	—N/a	Forfeit	15:00	—N/a	Brown & Whiplash

Playoffs

Semifinals; Chapter 35: Writing Nirvana On Other People's Bags; 28 August 2016
B1	Joe Coffey	Pinfall
A2	Dave Mastiff	9:24
A1	T-Bone	9:46
B2	Rampage Brown	Pinfall

Final; Chapter 36: We're Gonna Need A Bigger Room ... Again; 25 September 2016
B1	Joe Coffey	13:53
B2	Rampage Brown	Pinfall

== Reigns ==
Overall, there have been 18 reigns among 15 champions and one vacancy. Rampage Brown is the inaugural champion. Walter holds the record for most reigns with three. Axel Tischer held the title the longest at 426 days with zero successful title defenses, while both Matt Riddle and Mike D Vecchio held the title the shortest at 29 days with two successful title defenses. Doug Williams is the oldest champion at 45 years and 261 days, while Luke Jacobs is the youngest champion at 21 years and 240 days.

Tommy Tanner is the current champion in his first reign. He won the title by defeating previous champion Gene Munny, Donovan Dijak, and Sha Samuels in a four-way match at Chapter 197: Wrestling Over Everything on 31 August 2026, in Camden, London, England.

Key
No.	Overall reign number
Reign	Reign number for the specific champion
Days	Number of days held
Defenses	Number of successful defenses
+	Current reign is changing daily

No.	Champion	Championship change			Reign statistics			Notes	Ref.
No.	Champion	Date	Event	Location	Reign	Days	Defenses	Notes	Ref.
1	Rampage Brown	25 September 2016	Chapter 36: We're Gonna Need a Bigger Room... Again	Brixton, London, England	1	112	3	Defeated Joe Coffey in the tournament final to become the inaugural champion.	
2	Matt Riddle	15 January 2017	Chapter 42: Life, the Universe and Wrestling	Birmingham, England	1	175	9		
3	Walter	9 July 2017	Chapter 51: Screaming For Progress:	Birmingham, England	1	34	1		
4	Matt Riddle	12 August 2017	Progress: New York City	New York City, New York, U.S.	2	29	0		
5	Walter	10 September 2017	Chapter 55: Chase the Sun	Haringey, London, England	2	238	2	This was a three-way match, also involving Timothy Thatcher.	
—	Vacated	7 May 2018	Chapter 68: Super Strong Style 16	Haringey, London, England	—	—	—	Walter vacated the title.	
6	Doug Williams	20 May 2018	Chapter 69: Be Here Now	Manchester, England	1	133	2	Defeated Joseph Conners, Rampage Brown and Rob Lynch in a four-way match to win the vacant title.	
7	Trent Seven	30 September 2018	Chapter 76: Hello Wembley	Wembley, London, England	1	294	6		
8	Walter	5 May 2019	Chapter 88: Super Strong Style 16	Haringey, London, England	3	77	1	Progress World Champion Walter defeated Progress Altas Champion Trent Seven to unify the two titles.	
—	Deactivated	21 July 2019	Chapter 95: Still Chasing	—	—	—	—	Progress Wrestling retired the championship and replaced it with the Progress Proteus Championship.	
9	Luke Jacobs	18 April 2022	Chapter 133: Stop Motion Skeleton Battle	Camden Town, London, England	1	160	5	Defeated Jonah in the tournament final to win the reactivated championship.	
10	Big Damo	25 September 2022	Chapter 142: The Deadly Viper Tour	Birmingham, England	1	154	3		
11	Ricky Knight Jr.	26 February 2023	Chapter 150: When The Man Comes Around	London, England	1	404	6		
12	Yoichi	5 April 2024	Chapter 166: Freedom Walks Again	Philadelphia, Pennsylvania, U.S.	1	52	1		
13	Axel Tischer	27 May 2024	Super Strong Style 16 (Night 2)	London, England	1	426	2		
14	Mike D Vecchio	27 July 2025	Chapter 182: Stay Humble	London, England	1	29	0	This was a Tables match.	
15	Gene Munny	25 August 2025	Chapter 183: Hundred Volts	London, England	1	34	0	This was a three-way match also involving Will Kroos.	
16	Will Kroos	28 September 2025	Chapter 184: Camden Lock Up	London, England	1	95	3		
16	Saxon Huxley	1 January 2026	Noah The New Year 2026	Tokyo, Japan	1	45	1	This was a Pro Wrestling Noah event.	
17	Gene Munny	15 February 2026	Chapter 190: In Brightest Day	London, England	2	197	4		
18	Tommy Tanner	31 August 2026	Chapter 197: Wrestling Over Everything	Camden, London, England	1	56+	3	This four-way match also featured Donovan Dijak and Sha Samuels.	

== Combined reigns ==
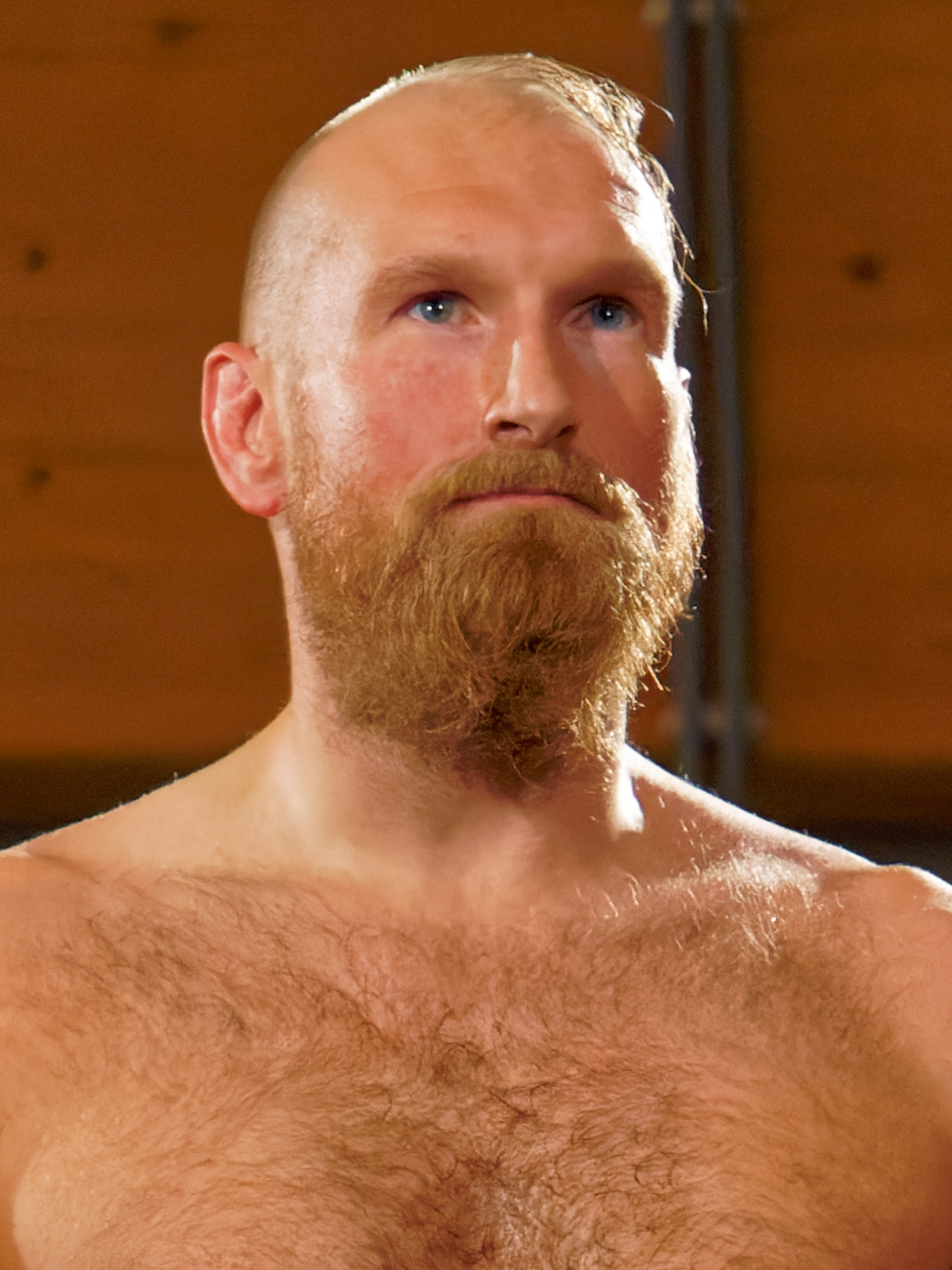
Axel Tischer held the title the longest at 426 days with two successful title defenses.

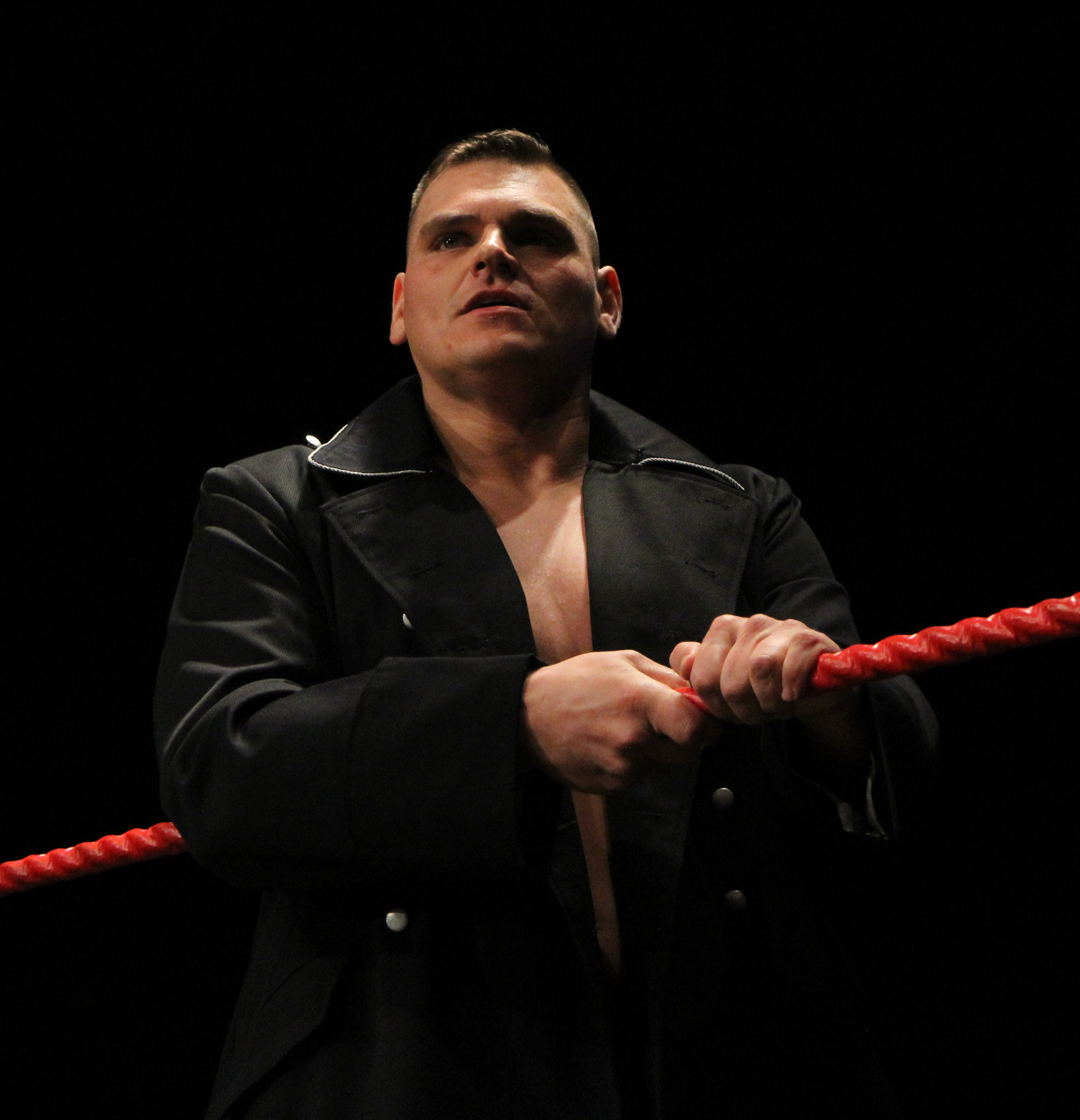
Walter has the most reigns at 3.

As of 26 October 2026.

†	Indicates the current champion

Rank	Wrestler	No. of reigns	Combined defenses	Combined days
1	Axel Tischer	1	2	426
2	Ricky Knight Jr.	1	6	404
3	Walter	3	4	349
4	Gene Munny	2	4	231
5	Trent Seven	1	6	217
6	Matt Riddle	2	9	204
7	Luke Jacobs	1	5	160
8	Big Damo	1	3	154
9	Doug Williams	1	2	132
10	Rampage Brown	1	3	112
11	Will Kroos	1	3	95
12	Tommy Tanner †	1	3	56+
13	Yoichi	1	1	52
14	Saxon Huxley	1	1	45
15	Mike D Vecchio	1	0	29
