= Nico Angelo =

Welsh professional wrestler

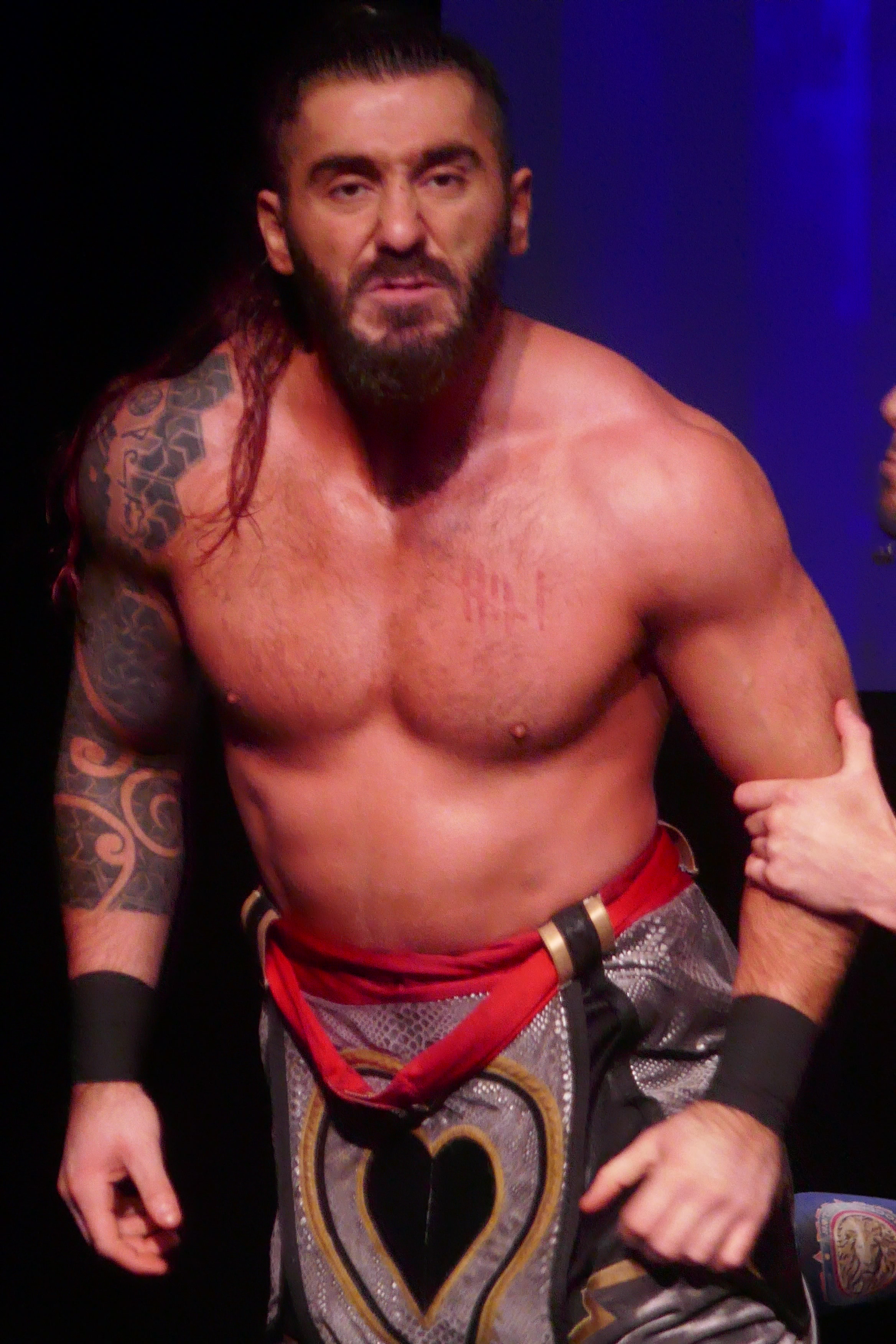
- Angelo in February 2025

Personal information
- Born: March 26, 1993 (age 33) Neath, Wales

Professional wrestling career
- Ring name: Nico Angelo Cadville
- Billed height: 173 cm (5 ft 8 in)
- Billed weight: 70 kg (154 lb)
- Trained by: Dragon Pro Wrestling School; Mark Andrews; Wild Boar
- Debut: 2018

Nico Angelo (born March 26, 1993) is a Welsh professional wrestler best known for his tenure with Progress Wrestling where he is a former one-time Progress Tag Team Champions alongside Connor Mills. He is also currently performs in various promotions from the British independent scene.

== Professional wrestling career ==
=== British independent circuit (2018–present) ===
Trained by Mark Andrews and Wild Boar in the Dragon Pro Wrestling (DPW) academy, Angelo made his professional wrestling debut at CTW Regresso Ao Sucesso, an event promoted by Portuguese promotion Centro De Treinos De Wrestling on February 10, 2018 under the ring name "Cadville" where he unsuccessfully challenged Thiago Montero for the CTW Heavyweight Championship. In the British independent circuit, Angelo competed in various promotions with longer or shorter stints such as TNT Extreme Wrestling (TNT), International Pro Wrestling: United Kingdom (IPW:UK), British Kingdom Pro-Wrestling (BKPW), New Wave Wrestling (NWW) and many others.

At RevPro Raw Deal 2022, an event promoted by Revolution Pro Wrestling on March 5, 2022, Angelo unsuccessfully challenged reigning champion Michael Oku for the Undisputed British Cruiserweight Championship in a six-way match also involving Callum Newman, Connor Mills, JJ Gale and Joe Lando.

=== Attack! Pro Wrestling (2018–present) ===
Angelo is best known for his tenure with Attack! Pro Wrestling. He made his debut at ATTACK!/DPW Thursday Night Throws #4 on May 17, 2018, where he defeated Brendan White in singles competition. Angelo is a former one-time Attack! Champion, title which he won at ATTACK! Under The Mistletour 2023 on December 16, by defeating Wild Boar and a one-time Attack! 24:7 Champion.

=== Progress Wrestling (2022–present) ===
Angelo made his Progress Wrestling debut at Chapter 144: The Deadly Viper Tour - Codename: Snake Charmer from October 16, 2022, where he defeated Joe Lando in the first rounds of the Natural Progression Series tournament.

Angelo mainly competes in the promotion's "Chapter" flagship events. He made his first appearance in one of this kind of events at Chapter 174: Vendetta 2 where he teamed up with Connor Mills to defeat Lykos Gym (Kid Lykos and Kid Lykos II). At Chapter 175: Unboxing VII: The Curtain Call on December 29, 2024, Angelo took part in a Thunderbastard match in which the winner gets to challenge for a championship of their choice, bout won by Tate Mayfairs which also involved Eddie Dennis, Kid Lykos, Rayne Leverkusen, Session Moth Martina and Lana Austin. At Chapter 185: Jump In The Line on October 26, 2025, he teamed up with "Diamond Eyes" tag team partner Connor Mills to defeat Sunshine Machine (Chuck Mambo and TK Cooper) and win the Progress Tag Team Championship.

== Championships and accomplishments ==
- Attack! Pro Wrestling
  - Attack! Championship (1 time)
  - Attack! 24:7 Championship (1 time)
- British Kingdom Pro-Wrestling
  - Brit King Pro Junior Heavyweight Championship (1 time)
- Pro Wrestling Chaos
  - Undisputed King Of Chaos Championship (1 time, current)
  - Knights Of Chaos Championship (1 time) – with Connor Mills
  - PWC Internet Championship (1 time)
  - All Wales Championship (1 time)
- Progress Wrestling
  - Progress Tag Team Championship (2 times, current) – with Connor Mills
- Riot Cabaret Pro Wrestling
  - Riot Cabaret World Championship (1 time)
- South West Wrestling
  - SWW Openweight Championship (1 time)
- TNT Extreme Wrestling
  - TNT Ultra X Championship (1 time)
  - Ultimate X (2022)
