= Progress World Tag Team Championship =

Professional wrestling championship

- Sunshine Machine (Chuck Mambo and TK Cooper) with the current title design

Details
- Promotion: Progress Wrestling
- Date established: 24 November 2013
- Current champions: Diamond Eyes (Connor Mills and Nico Angelo)
- Date won: 31 August 2026
Statistics
- First champions: FSU (Mark Andrews and Eddie Dennis)
- Most reigns: As tag team (3 reigns): CCK (Note: Chris Brookes and Kid Lykos won the Progress Tag Team Championship thrice. During their third reign, Kid Lykos suffered an injury and was unable to defend the title. Either Jonathan Gresham or A. R. Fox replaced Lykos in CCK's title defenses.); Grizzled Young Veterans; Smokin' Aces; As individual (5 reigns): Kid Lykos
- Longest reign: Sunshine Machine (Chuck Mambo and TK Cooper) (358 days)
- Shortest reign: The Origin (El Ligero and Nathan Cruz) (1 day)
- Oldest champion: Big Damo (39 years, 45 days)
- Youngest champion: Scotty Davis (18 years, 286 days)
- Heaviest champion: SAnitY (Big Damo and Axel Tischer) (567 lb (257 kg) combined)

The Progress World Tag Team Championship is a professional wrestling championship created and promoted by the British professional wrestling promotion Progress Wrestling. Introduced on 24 November 2013, the inaugural champions were FSU (Mark Andrews and Eddie Dennis).

== History ==
It was announced at Chapter 9 that beginning in November 2013 there would begin a series of matches to determine the first Progress Tag Team champions. The champions were crowned at Chapter 12, the second anniversary show, in March 2014. As with the Progress Championship not being a conventional championship belt, the Progress Tag Team Championship was originally represented by a shield with the Progress eagle on the front. The shield splits into two, one for each championship holder.

At Chapter 46 the Tag Team shields were replaced with traditional strap title belts, with the design on the front plate of each belt representing the defunct Tag shields.

== Reigns ==
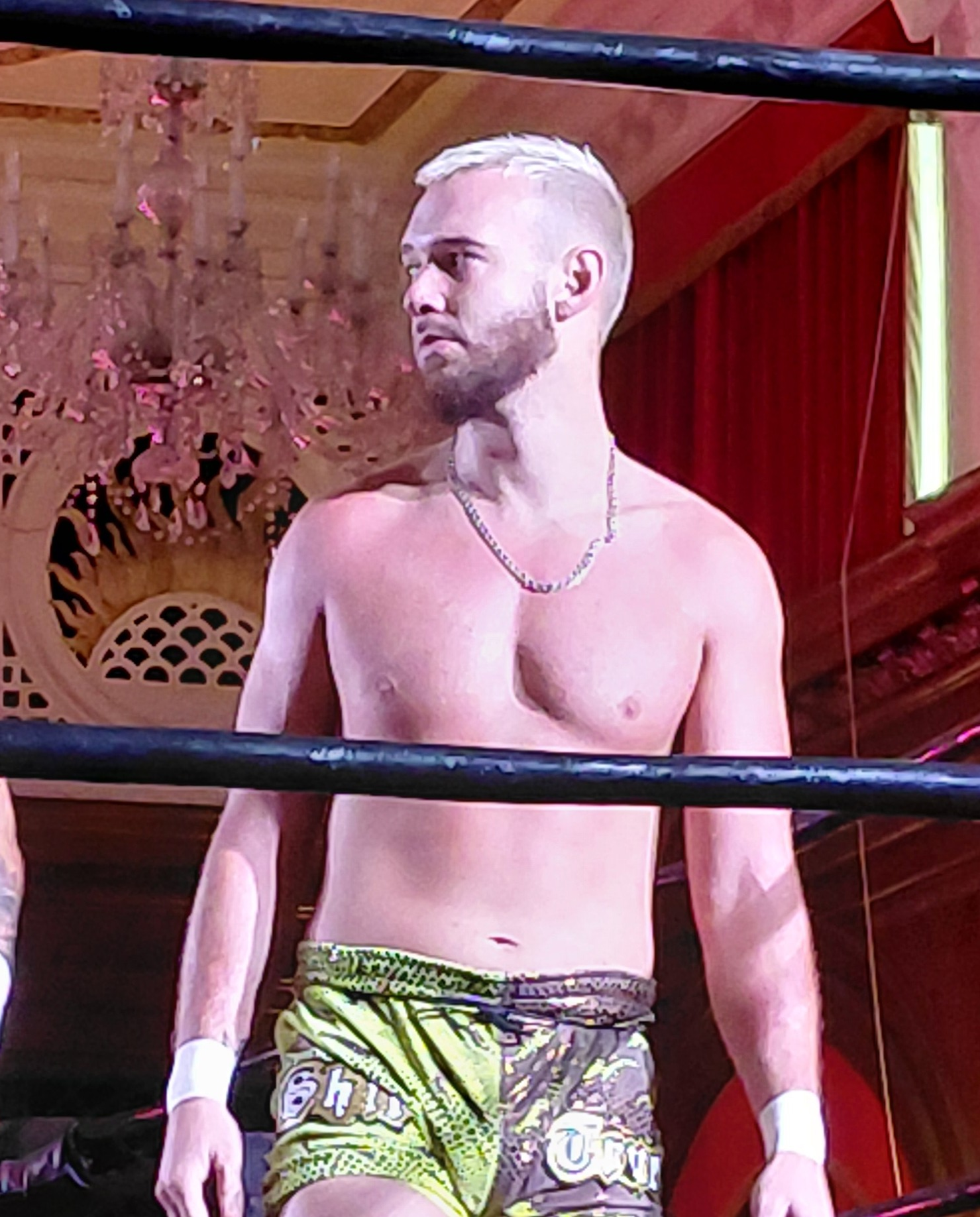
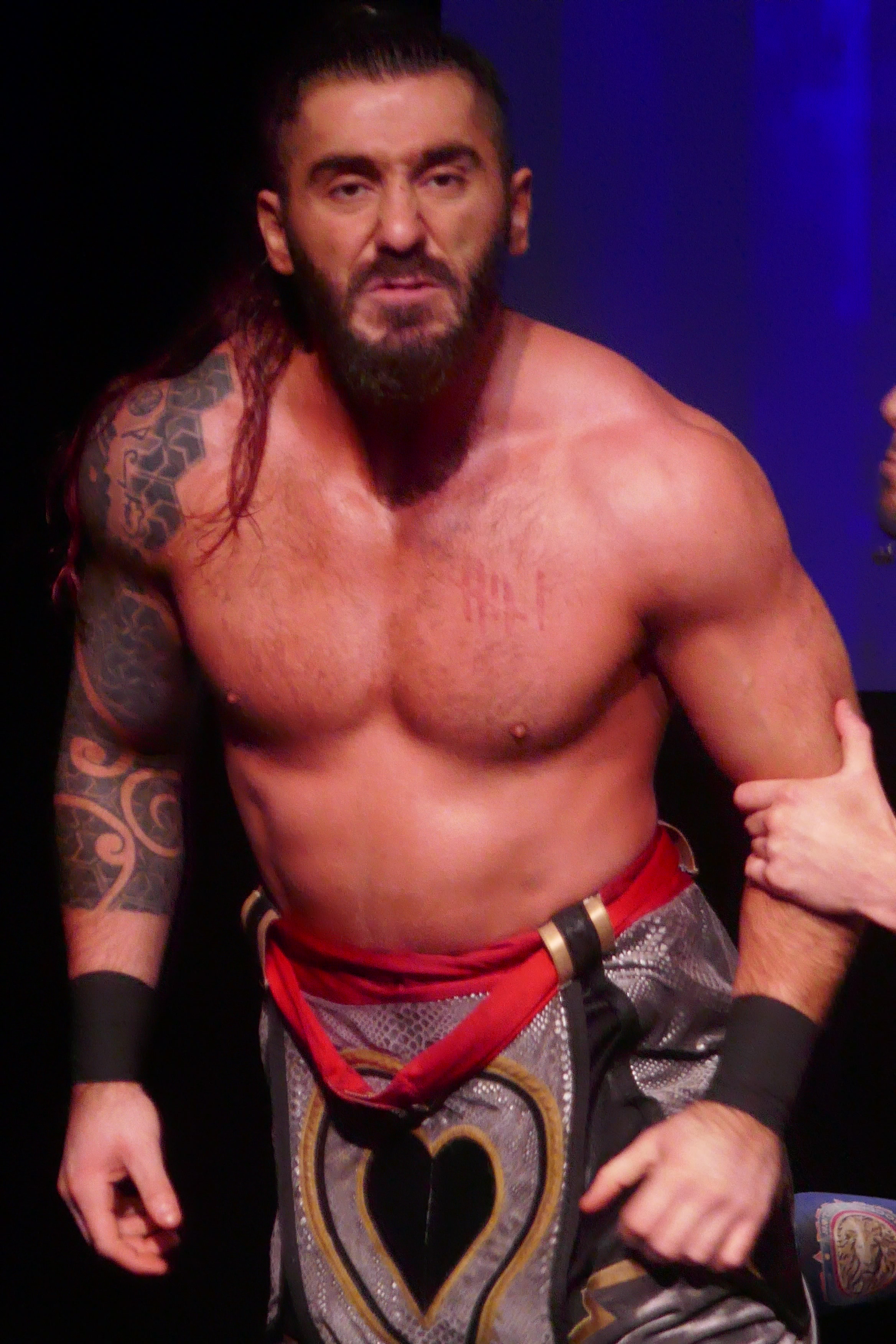
Current and two-time champions Diamond Eyes (Connor Mills and Nico Angelo)

Overall, there have been a total of 35 reigns shared among 22 different teams composed of 44 individual champions. The inaugural champions are FSU (Mark Andrews and Eddie Dennis). As tag teams, CCK (Chris Brookes and Kid Lykos), Grizzled Young Veterans (James Drake and Zack Gibson), and Smokin' Aces (Charlie Sterling and Nick Riley) are tied for the most reigns at three, while Lykos has the most individual reigns at five. Sunshine Machine (Chuck Mambo and TK Cooper) held the titles the longest at 358 days, while The Origin (El Ligero and Nathan Cruz) held the titles the shortest at one day. Big Damo is the oldest champion at 39 years and 45 days, while Scotty Davis is the youngest champion at 18 years and 286 days.

Diamond Eyes (Connor Mills and Nico Angelo) are the current champions in their second reign as a team and individually. They won the titles by defeating The 0121 (Dan Moloney and Man Like DeReiss) at Chapter 197: Wrestling Over Everything on 31 August 2026, in Camden, London, England.

Key
No.	Overall reign number
Reign	Reign number for the specific team—reign numbers for the individuals are in parentheses, if different
Days	Number of days held
Defenses	Number of successful defenses
+	Current reign is changing daily

No.	Champion	Championship change			Reign statistics			Notes	Ref.
No.	Champion	Date	Event	Location	Reign	Days	Defenses	Notes	Ref.
1	FSU (Mark Andrews and Eddie Dennis)	30 March 2014	Chapter 12: We're Gonna Need a Bigger Room	Camden Town, London, England	1	301	2	Defeated Screw Indy Wrestling (Mark Haskins and Nathan Cruz) and Project Ego (Kris Travis and Martin Kirby) in the three-way tournament final to become the inaugural champions.	
2	The Faceless/The Origin (Faceless #1/Danny Garnell and Faceless #2/Damon Moser)	25 January 2015	Chapter 17: Harder, Better, Faster, Stronger	Camden Town, London, England	1	119	2	The Faceless unmasked themselves on 24 May, rebranding themselves as "The Origin".	
3	The Origin (El Ligero and Nathan Cruz)	24 May 2015	Chapter 19: Super Strong Style 16; Night 2	Camden Town, London, England	1	1	0	Danny Garnell and Damon Moser were kicked out of The Origin. Ligero and Cruz took over as champions.	
4	Sumerian Death Squad (Tommy End and Michael Dante)	25 May 2015	Chapter 19: Super Strong Style 16; Night 2	Camden Town, London, England	1	188	2		
5	The Origin (Nathan Cruz and El Ligero)	29 November 2015	Chapter 23: What a Time to Be Alive	Camden Town, London, England	2	182	3	This was a three-way tag team match, also involved London Riots (James Davis and Rob Lynch).	
6	London Riots (Rob Lynch and James Davis)	29 May 2016	Chapter 30: Super Strong Style 16	Camden Town, London, England	1	119	3		
7	British Strong Style (Trent Seven and Pete Dunne)	25 September 2016	Chapter 36: We're Gonna Need a Bigger Room... Again	Brixton, London, England	1	82	1		
—	Vacated	16 December 2016	—	—	—	—	—	Progress Wrestling vacated the title after Pete Dunne attempted to give his half of the title to Tyler Bate.	
8	British Strong Style (Trent Seven and Tyler Bate)	30 December 2016	Chapter 41: Unboxing Live	Camden Town, London, England	1 (2, 1)	177	3	Defeated London Riots (James Davis & Rob Lynch) and Leaders of the New School (Marty Scurll and Zack Sabre Jr.) to win the vacant titles.	
9	CCK (Chris Brookes and Kid Lykos)	25 June 2017	Chapter 50: I Give it Six Months	Camden Town, London, England	1	14	0		
10	British Strong Style (Trent Seven and Tyler Bate)	9 July 2017	Chapter 51: Screaming For Progress	Birmingham, England	2 (3, 2)	63	4	This was a six-man tag team match with Pete Dunne as Seven and Bate's partner and Travis Banks as Brookes and Lykos' partner. Only Bate and Seven were recognized as the new champions.	
11	CCK (Chris Brookes and Kid Lykos)	10 September 2017	Chapter 55: Chase the Sun	Haringey, London, England	2	77	1	This was a ladder match.	
12	Grizzled Young Veterans (James Drake and Zack Gibson)	26 November 2017	Chapter 58: Live Your Best Life	Camden Town, London, England	1	77	2		
13	Jimmy Havoc and Mark Haskins	11 February 2018	Chapter 63: Take Me Underground	Manchester, England	1	14	0		
14	Grizzled Young Veterans (James Drake and Zack Gibson)	25 February 2018	Chapter 64: Thunderbastards Are Go!	Camden Town, London, England	2	160	6		
15	CCK (Chris Brookes and Kid Lykos)	4 August 2018	USA Coast to Coast Tour	Philadelphia, Pennsylvania, U.S.	3	7	2	Due to Lykos' injury, either Jonathan Gresham or A. R. Fox defended the titles on his behalf with Brookes.	
16	MexaBlood (Flamita and Bandido)	11 August 2018	USA Coast to Coast Tour	Chicago, Illinois, U.S.	1	50	1	Chris Brookes and A. R. Fox represented CCK in this title match.	
17	Aussie Open (Kyle Fletcher and Mark Davis)	30 September 2018	Chapter 76: Hello Wembley	Wembley, London, England	1	91	4	This was an eight-team Thunderbastard match, also featuring Anti-Fun Police (Chief Deputy Dunne and Los Federales Santos Jr.), Calamari Thatch Kings (Chris Brookes and Timothy Thatcher), Grizzled Young Veterans (James Drake and Zack Gibson), The 198 (Morgan Webster and Wild Boar), Connor Mills and Maverick Mayhew, and David Starr and Jack Sexsmith.	
18	The Swords of Essex (Will Ospreay and Paul Robinson)	30 December 2018	Chapter 82: Unboxing Live, A Dukla Prague Away Kit	Camden Town, London, England	1	91	2		
19	Aussie Open (Kyle Fletcher and Mark Davis)	31 March 2019	Chapter 87: Breadknife	Camden Town, London, England	2	119	2	This was Davis' Natural Progression Series cash-in match. This was a tables, ladders, and chairs match.	
20	Grizzled Young Veterans (James Drake and Zack Gibson)	28 July 2019	Chapter 93: Cheer Up Juice	Camden Town, London, England	3	49	0		
21	Jordan Devlin and Scotty Davis	15 September 2019	Chapter 95: Still Chasing	Haringey, London, England	1	278	3	This was Davis' Natural Progression Series cash-in match. This was a three-way tag team match, also involved Aussie Open (Kyle Fletcher and Mark Davis).	
—	Vacated	19 June 2020	—	—	—	—	—	Vacated by Progress Wrestling vacated the title after Scotty Davis and Jordan Devlin were legitimately suspended.	
22	Lykos Gym (Kid Lykos and Kid Lykos II)	5 June 2021	Chapter 112: The Flowers Are Still Standing!	London, England	1 (4, 1)	98	2	Defeated The Young Guns (Luke Jacobs and Ethan Allen) in the tournament final to win the vacant championship.	
23	Smokin' Aces (Charlie Sterling and Nick Riley)	11 September 2021	Chapter 121: In 20 Years This Will All Be Orange	London, England	1	195	6		
24	The 0121 (Dan Moloney and Man Like DeReiss)	25 March 2022	Chapter 131: 10th Anniversary	London, England	1	71	1	This was a five-way gauntlet match, also involved Lykos Gym (Kid Lykos and Kid Lykos II), Sunshine Machine (Chuck Mambo and TK Cooper), and North West Strong (Chris Ridgeway and Luke Jacobs).	
25	Sunshine Machine (Chuck Mambo and TK Cooper)	4 June 2022	Chapter 135: Super Strong Style 16	London, England	1	358	13	This was a three-way ladder match, also involved Smokin' Aces (Charlie Sterling and Nick Riley).	
26	Smokin' Aces (Charlie Sterling and Nick Riley)	28 May 2023	Chapter 153: Super Strong Style 16	London, England	2	273	2	This was a ladder match.	
27	Cheeky Little Buggers (Charles Crowley and Alexxis Falcon)	25 February 2024	Chapter 163: Twisted Metal	London, England	1	40	1	Falcon became the first female to win the titles.	
28	SAnitY (Big Damo and Axel Tischer)	5 April 2024	Chapter 166: Freedom Walks Again	Philadelphia, Pennsylvania, U.S.	1	170	4	This was a three-way tag team match, also involved Sunshine Machine (Chuck Mambo and TK Cooper).	
29	Smokin' Aces (Charlie Sterling and Nick Riley)	22 September 2024	Chapter 171: History Is Written By The Victors	London, England	3	189	4	This was a Street Fight.	
30	Sunshine Machine (Chuck Mambo and TK Cooper)	30 March 2025	Chapter 178: Fix Your Hearts	London, England	2	91	0		
31	Lykos Gym (Kid Lykos and Kid Lykos II)	29 June 2025	Chapter 181: Far From Ordinary People	Manchester, England	2 (5, 2)	119	3		
32	Diamond Eyes (Connor Mills and Nico Angelo)	26 October 2025	Chapter 185: Jump In The Line	London, England	1	154	3	This was a three-way match, also involved Sunshine Machine (Chuck Mambo and TK Cooper).	
33	Young Guns (Ethan Allen and Luke Jacobs)	29 March 2026	Chapter 192: Cause & Effect	London, England	1	70	0	Jay Joshua defended the title on Connor Mills's behalf.	
34	The 0121 (Drilla Moloney and Man Like DeReiss)	7 June 2026	Chapter 195: Wonderbrawl II	Manchester, England	2	85	0	Moloney was previously known as Dan Moloney.	
35	Diamond Eyes (Connor Mills and Nico Angelo)	31 August 2026	Chapter 197: Wrestling Over Everything	Camden, London, England	2	63+	0		

== Combined reigns ==
As of 2 November 2026.

†	Indicates the current champion

=== By team ===
Rank	Team	No. of reigns	Combined defenses	Combined days
1	Smokin' Aces (Charlie Sterling and Nick Riley)	3	12	657
2	Sunshine Machine (Chuck Mambo and TK Cooper)	2	13	449
3	FSU (Mark Andrews and Eddie Dennis)	1	2	301
4	Grizzled Young Veterans (James Drake and Zack Gibson)	3	8	286
5	Jordan Devlin and Scotty Davis	1	3	278
6	British Strong Style (Trent Seven and Tyler Bate)	2	7	240
7	Diamond Eyes † (Connor Mills and Nico Angelo)	2	3	217+
8	Lykos Gym (Kid Lykos and Kid Lykos II)	2	5	217
9	Aussie Open (Kyle Fletcher and Mark Davis)	2	6	210
10	Sumerian Death Squad (Tommy End and Michael Dante)	1	2	188
11	The Origin (El Ligero and Nathan Cruz)	2	3	183
12	Sanity (Big Damo and Axel Tischer)	1	4	170
13	The 0121 (Dan/Drilla Moloney and Man Like DeReiss)	2	1	156
14	The Faceless/The Origin (Faceless #1/Danny Garnell and Faceless #2/Damon Moser)	1	2	119
15	London Riots (Rob Lynch and James Davis)	1	3	119
16	CCK (Chris Brookes and Kid Lykos)	3	3	98
17	The Swords of Essex (Will Ospreay and Paul Robinson)	1	2	91
18	British Strong Style (Trent Seven and Pete Dunne)	1	1	82
19	Young Guns (Ethan Allen and Luke Jacobs)	1	0	70
20	MexaBlood (Flamita and Bandido)	1	1	50
21	Cheeky Little Buggers (Charles Crowley and Alexxis Falcon)	1	1	40
22	Jimmy Havoc and Mark Haskins	1	0	14

=== By wrestler ===
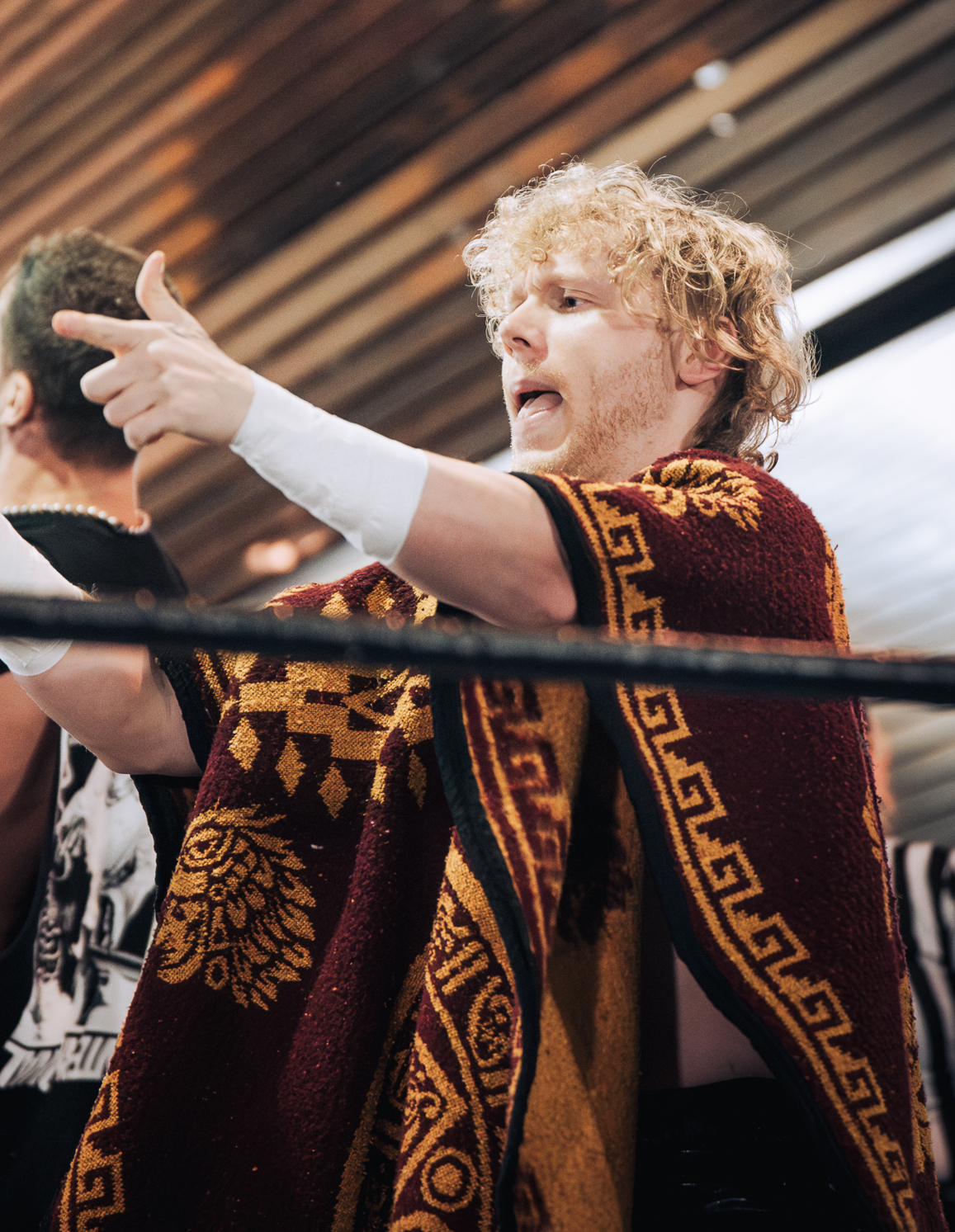
Kid Lykos has the most individual reigns at five.

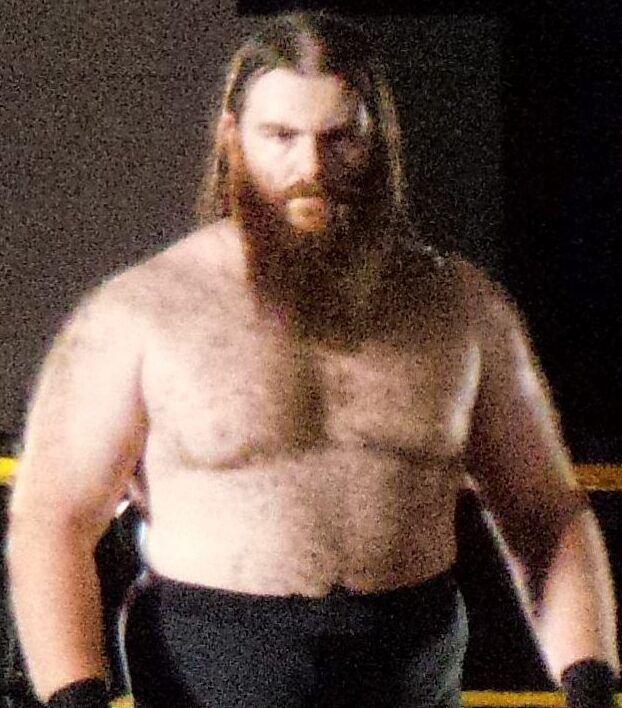
Big Damo is the oldest champion, winning the title at 39 years and 45 days old.

Rank	Wrestler	No. of reigns	Combined defenses	Combined days
1	Charlie Sterling	3	12	657
1	Nick Riley	3	12	657
3	Chuck Mambo	2	13	449
3	TK Cooper	2	13	449
5	Trent Seven	3	8	322
6	Kid Lykos	5	8	315
7	El Ligero	2	5	302
7	Nathan Cruz	2	5	302
9	Eddie Dennis	1	2	301
9	Mark Andrews	1	2	301
11	James Drake	3	8	286
11	Zack Gibson	3	8	286
13	Jordan Devlin	1	3	278
13	Scotty Davis	1	3	278
15	Tyler Bate	2	7	240
16	Connor Mills †	2	3	217+
16	Nico Angelo †	2	3	217+
18	Kid Lykos II	2	5	217
19	Kyle Fletcher	2	6	210
19	Mark Davis	2	6	210
21	Michael Dante	1	2	188
21	Tommy End	1	2	188
23	Axel Tischer	1	4	170
23	Big Damo	1	4	170
25	Dan Moloney/Drilla Moloney	2	1	156
25	Man Like DeReiss	2	1	156
27	James Davis	1	3	119
27	Rob Lynch	1	3	119
27	Faceless #2/Damon Moser	1	2	119
27	Faceless #1/Danny Garnell	1	2	119
31	Chris Brookes	3	3	98
32	Paul Robinson	1	2	91
32	Will Ospreay	1	2	91
34	Pete Dunne	1	1	82
35	Ethan Allen	1	0	70
35	Luke Jacobs	1	0	70
37	Bandido	1	1	50
37	Flamita	1	1	50
39	Alexxis Falcon	1	1	40
39	Charles Crowley	1	1	40
41	Jimmy Havoc	1	0	14
41	Mark Haskins	1	0	14
43	A. R. Fox	1	2	7
43	Jonathan Gresham	1	2	7
