= Sunshine Machine =

Professional wrestling tag team

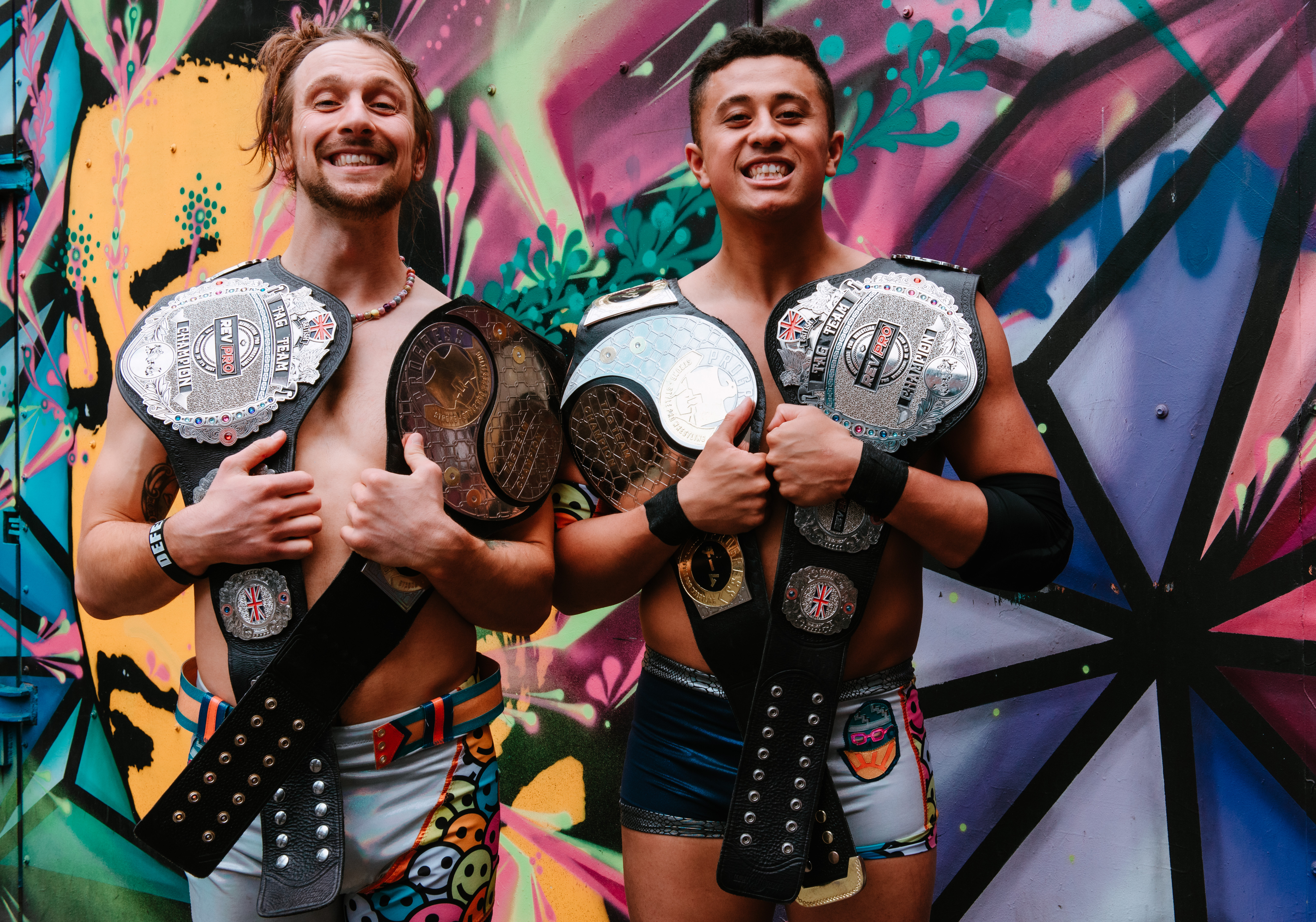
- Chuck Mambo (left) and TK Cooper (right) in June 2022

Tag team
- Name(s): Escaping The Midcard; Sunshine Machine; The Machine
- Members: Chuck Mambo; TK Cooper
- Billed heights: Mambo: 6 ft 3 in (1.91 m); Cooper: 6 ft 2 in (1.88 m)
- Debut: 2019
- Years active: 2019–present

Sunshine Machine, also called The Machine in Revolution Pro Wrestling (RevPro), is a British professional wrestling tag team consisting of Chuck Mambo and TK Cooper. They currently perform on the British independent scene and for various other promotions.

== Professional wrestling career ==
=== British independent scene (2018–present) ===
Due to mainly evolving as freelancers, Mambo and Cooper are known for competing in various promotions from the British independent scene. They made their debut as a team at "Empire The Gauntlet", a house show promoted by the Empire Wrestling promotion on 23 September 2018, where they competed in a gauntlet tag team match for the vacant Empire Tag Team Championship, won by Trial By Violence (Gabriel Kidd and Saxon Huxley), and also involving other notable teams such as Brendan White and Wild Boar, Amir Jordan and Prince Ameen, and many others. On the first night of Over the Top Wrestling's eighth anniversary event from 28 October 2022, Mambo and Cooper defeated Millie McKenzie and Session Moth Martina in an intergender tag team match.

=== Revolution Pro Wrestling (2020–present) ===
Mambo and Cooper made their debut in Revolution Pro Wrestling under the name of Escaping The Midcard at RevPro Live In Southampton 12 on February 23, 2020, where they fell short to The Legion (Rampage Brown and Great-O-Khan). At RevPro High Stakes on 29 January 2022, Mambo and Cooper successfully defended their Rev Pro British Tag Team Championship against Aussie Open (Kyle Fletcher and Mark Davis). Mambo and Cooper participated in the 2022 edition of the Revolution Great British Tag League where they placed themselves in the Block B and scored a total of three points after fighting against various teams such as The VeloCities (Jude London & Paris De Silva), The Legion (Shota Umino & Yota Tsuji) and Lykos Gym (Kid Lykos & Kid Lykos II).

=== Progress Wrestling (2021–present) ===
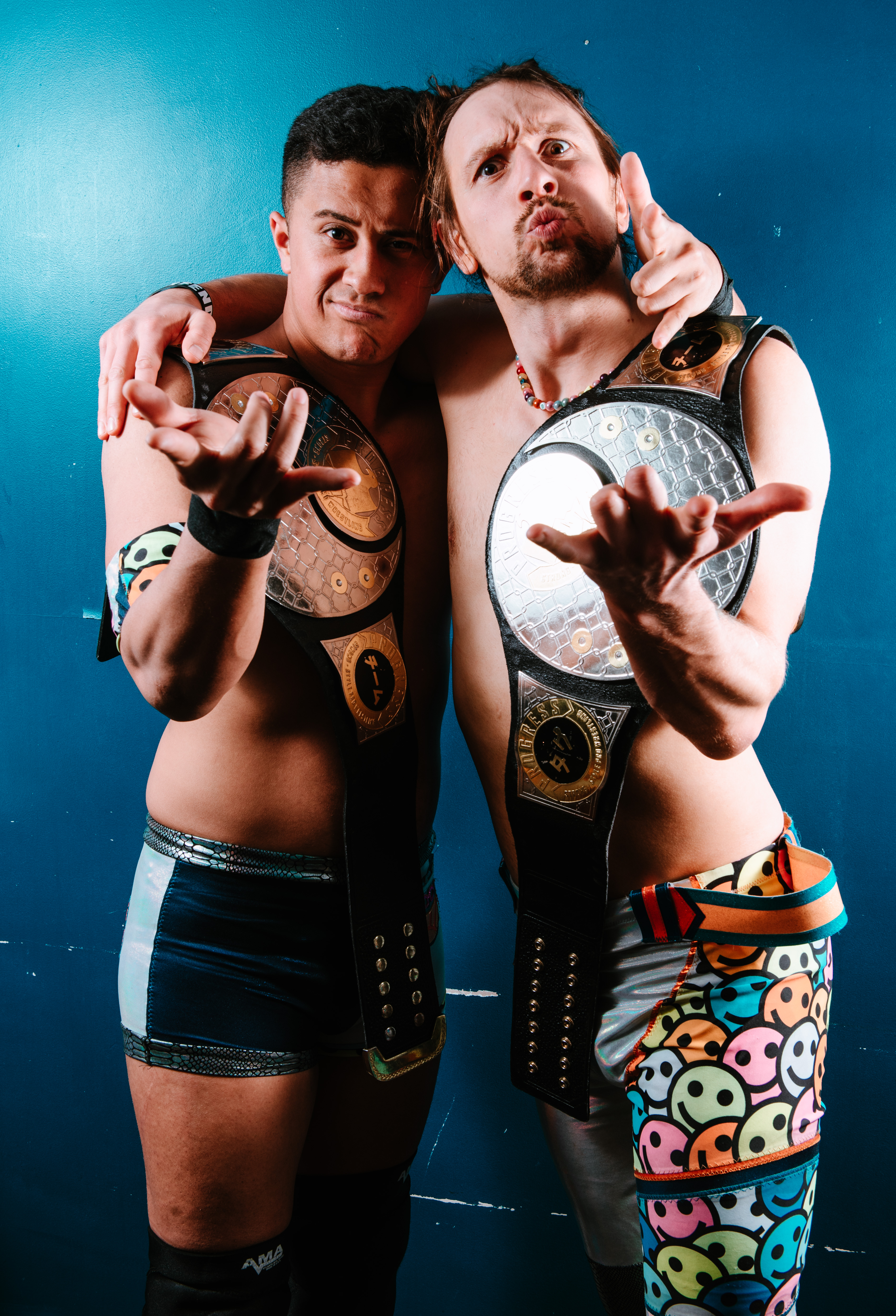
Cooper (left) and Mambo (right) as the Progress Tag Team Champions in June 2022.

Mambo and Cooper made their debut in Progress Wrestling at PROGRESS Chapter 107 on 27 March 2021, where they defeated The Young Guns (Ethan Allen and Luke Jacobs). Mambo and Cooper won the PROGRESS Tag Team Championship for the first time as a team by defeating The 0121 (Dan Moloney and Man Like DeReiss). At PROGRESS Chapter 132 on 17 April 2022, Mambo and Cooper fell short to The 0121 (Dan Moloney & Man Like DeReiss) for the tag titles. At PROGRESS Chapter 136 on 24 July, Mambo and Cooper successfully defended the tag titles against Leon Slater and Ricky Knight Jr. At PROGRESS Chapter 153 on 28 May 2023, they lost the tag titles to Smokin' Aces (Charlie Sterling and Nick Riley), ending their reign at a record-setting 358 days.

== Personal lives ==
Chuck Mambo was born Gareth Snelling on September 16, 1992 in Newquay, England and TK Cooper was born Tasman Bartlett-Masina on April 18, 1993 in Auckland, New Zealand).

== Championships and accomplishments ==
- Attack! Pro Wrestling
  - Attack! 24/7 Championship (5 times) – Mambo
- Bodyslam! Pro Wrestling
  - Bodyslam! Tag Team Championship (1 time)
- Breed Pro Wrestling
  - Breed Pro Championship (1 time) – Cooper
- DEFEND Indy Wrestling
  - DEFEND Indy Wrestling Ten year Anniversary Tournament (2021) – Mambo
- Full Tilt Wrestling
  - FTW Heavyweight Championship (1 time) – Mambo
- German Wrestling Federation
  - GWF Tag Team Championship (2 times)
- Kamikaze Pro
  - Kamikaze Pro Tag Team Championship (1 time)
- Melbourne City Wrestling
  - MCW World Heavyweight Championship (1 time) – Cooper
- Pro Wrestling Ambush
  - Ambush Championship (1 time) – Cooper
- Pro Wrestling Illustrated
  - Ranked TK Cooper No. 162 of the top 500 singles wrestlers in the PWI Men's 500 in 2017
  - Ranked Chuck Mambo No. 320 of the top 500 singles wrestlers in the PWI Men's 500 in 2020
- Progress Wrestling
  - PROGRESS Tag Team Championship (2 times)
  - Progress World Cup (2018) – Mambo
- Revolution Pro Wrestling
  - Undisputed British Tag Team Championship (2 times)
  - RPW Heavyweight Championship Number 1 Contender Tournament (2025) – TK Cooper
- Riot Cabaret Wrestling
  - Riot Cabaret World Championship (1 time, inaugural) – Mambo
  - Riot Cabaret Tag Team Championship (1 time)
  - Riot Cabaret World Title Tournament (2022) – Mambo
- Riptide Wrestling
  - Riptide Brighton Championship (1 time) – Mambo
- Tidal Championship Wrestling
  - TCW Championship (1 time) – Mambo
