= Gene Munny =

English professional wrestler

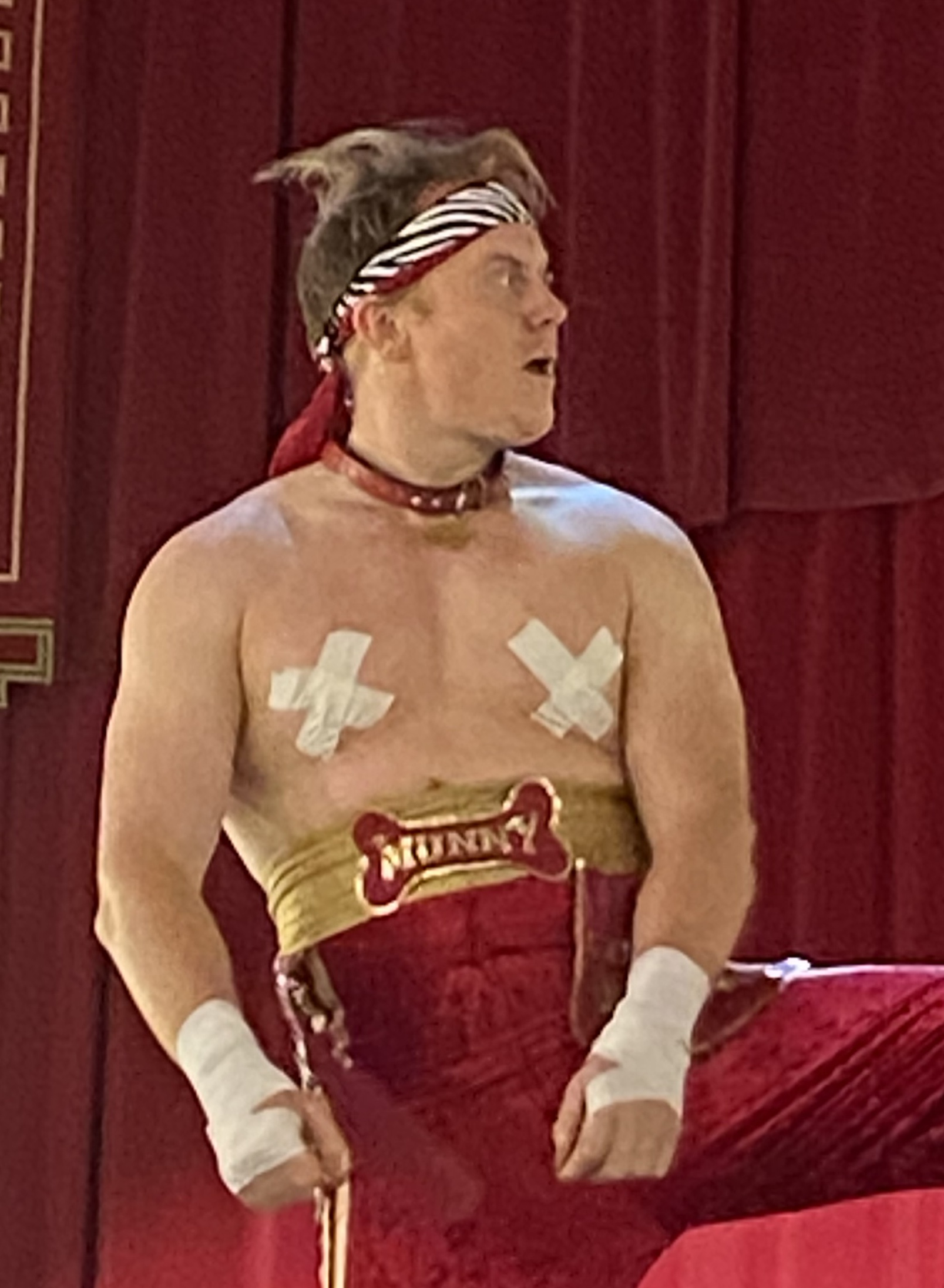
- Munny in October 2025

Personal information
- Born: August 25, 1989 (age 37) Milton Keynes, England

Professional wrestling career
- Ring name: Chief Deputy Munn Detective Munny Johnny Lavelle Gene Munny
- Trained by: House Of Pain Wrestling School (Stixx); London School Of Lucha Libre (Greg Burridge)
- Debut: 2012

Gene Munny (born August 25, 1989) is an English professional wrestler, He currently works on the Progress Wrestling, where he is the former two-time Progress Atlas Champion. He is also makes appearances on the British independent scene.

== Professional wrestling career ==
=== British independent scene (2012–present) ===
Munny made his professional wrestling debut under the ring name of "Johnny Lavelle" at FWA At MCM Expo, an event promoted by Frontier Wrestling Alliance on March 31, 2012, where he teamed up with Alex Kaos in a losing effort against Max Angelus and Zack Nitro in tag team competition. Through his career as a freelancer, Munny wrestled for various promotions from the British independent circuit such as TNT Extreme Wrestling (TNT), Insane Championship Wrestling (ICW), International Pro Wrestling: United Kingdom (IPW:UK), Ignite Wrestling Pro (IWP) and many others.

At IPW This Has To End, an event of IPW:UK from May 1, 2019, Munny competed in a six-way scramble match to determine the number one contender to the IPW:UK World Championship won by Sha Samuels and also involving Dan Moloney, Ricky Knight Jr., Charles Crowley and Big Guns Joe.

=== Progress Wrestling (2019–present) ===
Munny made his debut in Progress Wrestling at Chapter 95: Still Chasing on September 15, 2019, where he competed in the inaugural rumble match for the Progress Proteus Championship, bout won by Paul Robinson and also involving notable opponents such as Chris Brookes, Ilja Dragunov, Travis Banks and Eddie Kingston.

During his time with the promotion, he chased for various accomplishments. In the 2024 edition of the Super Strong Style 16, Munny fell short to Kid Lykos II in the first rounds of the tournament. At PROGRESS Chapter 156: Steal Yourself on September 10, 2023, he unsuccessfully challenged Laurance Roman for the wXw Shotgun Championship.

In 2022, Munny competed in a tournament for the vacant Progress World Championship in which he fell short to Rickey Shane Page in the first rounds. At Chapter 174: Vendetta 2 on November 24, 2024, Munny unsuccessfully challenged reigning champion Simon Miller for the Progress Proteus Championship in a match which also involved Will Kroos and Session Moth Martina. At Chapter 175: Unboxing VII: The Curtain Call on December 29, 2024, he teamed up with Will Kroos and unsuccessfully challenged reigning champions Smokin' Aces (Charlie Sterling and Nick Riley) for the Progress Tag Team Championship in a match which also involved the team of Simon Miller and Jerry Bakewell. At Chapter 183: Hundred Volts on August 25, 2025, he defeated reigning champion Mike D Vecchio and Will Kroos in a three-way match to win the Progress Atlas Championship. He dropped the title to Kroos one month later at Chapter 184: Camden Lock Up on September 28, 2025.

== Championships and accomplishments ==
- NORTH Wrestling
  - NORTH Championship (1 time)
- APEX Pro Wrestling
  - APEX Division A Championship (1 time)
- Discovery Wrestling
  - DW Y Division Championship (2 time, current)
  - Uncivil War Tournament (2017) – with Rob Cage
- Good Wrestling
  - Good Wrestling Grand Prize Championship (1 time)
- Hope Wrestling
  - Hope Tag Team Championship (1 time) – with Tim Lee
- Ignite Wrestling Pro
  - Ignite Championship (1 time)
- Pro Wrestling Illustrated
  - Ranked No. 346 of the top 500 singles wrestlers in the PWI 500 in 2026
- Progress Wrestling
  - Progress Atlas Championship (2 times)
- Rebel County Wrestling
  - RCW Trios Championship (1 time) – with Debbie Keitel and J-Money
- RISE Underground Pro Wrestling
  - RISE Championship (1 time)
- Wrestling Resurgence
  - Resurgence Championship (1 time)
  - Resurgence Tag Team Championship (1 time) – with Munnywood Blondes and Elijah
- Other accomplishments
  - Tag Team Tombola Tournament (2023) – with Connor Mills
