= Progress Chapter 189: In Darkest Night =

2026 Progress Wrestling event

Chapter 189: In Darkest Night
- Promotional poster of the event
- Promotion: Progress Wrestling
- Date: 25 January 2026
- City: London, England
- Venue: Electric Ballroom

Event chronology
← Previous; Chapter 188: Unboxing VIII: The Search For Socks	Next → Chapter 190: In Brightest Day

The Chapter 189: In Darkest Night was a professional wrestling event produced by Progress Wrestling. It took place on 25 January 2026, in London, England, at the Electric Ballroom.

Eight matches were contested at the event. In the main event, Alexxis Falcon defeated Rayne Leverkusen to win the Progress World Women's Championship.

== Production ==
=== Storylines ===
The event included matches that each resulted from scripted storylines, where wrestlers portrayed heroes, villains, or less distinguishable characters in scripted events that built tension and culminated in a wrestling match or series of matches. Results were predetermined by Progress' creative writers, while storylines were produced on Progress' events airing on the Demand PROGRESS streaming service.

=== Event ===
The event started with the first round bout of the 2026 Super Strong Style 16 tournament in which Jay Joshua defeated Kid Lykos II. Next up, Skye Smitson defeated Anita Vaughan and LA Taylor picked up a victory over Session Moth Martina in the first rounds of the inaugural women's Super Strong Style tournament.

In the fourth match, Saxon Huxley defeated Axel Tischer to secure the first successful defense of the Progress Atlas Championship in that respective reign. Next up, Man Like DeReiss defeated Cara Noir by disqualification to secure the eleventh consecutive defense of the PROGRESS World Championship in that respective reign. The sixth bout saw Connor Mills and Nico Angelo defeat Gene Munny and Kouga to secure the second successful defense of the Progress Tag Team Championship in that respective reign. In the semi main event, Big Damo outmatched Spike Trivet in singles competition.

In the main event, Alexxis Falcon defeated Rayne Leverkusen to win the Progress World Women's Championship, ending the latter's reign at 91 days and three defenses.

== Results ==
No.	Results	Stipulations	Times
1	Jay Joshua defeated Kid Lykos II by forfeit	First round match in the Super Strong Style 16 tournament	11:09
2	Skye Smitson (with LA Taylor) defeated Anita Vaughan (with Safire Reed) by pinfall	First round match in the Women's Super Strong Style 16 tournament	7:25
3	LA Taylor defeated Session Moth Martina (with Gene Munny) by pinfall	First round match in the Women's Super Strong Style 16 tournament	7:46
4	Saxon Huxley (c) defeated Axel Tischer by pinfall	Singles match for the Progress Atlas Championship	11:45
5	Man Like DeReiss (c) defeated Cara Noir by disqualification	Singles match for the PROGRESS World Championship	6:14
6	Diamond Eyes (Connor Mills and Nico Angelo) (c) defeated Gene Munny and Kouga (with Session Moth Martina) by pinfall	Tag team match for the Progress Tag Team Championship	13:19
7	Big Damo defeated Spike Trivet by pinfall	Singles match	11:22
8	Alexxis Falcon defeated Rayne Leverkusen (c) by pinfall	Singles match for the Progress World Women's Championship	16:29
(c) / – the champion(s) heading into the match
