= Progress Chapter 188: Unboxing VIII: The Search For Socks =

2025 Progress Wrestling event

Chapter 188: Unboxing VIII: The Search For Socks
- Promotional poster of the event
- Promotion: Progress Wrestling
- Date: 28 December 2025
- City: London, England
- Venue: Electric Ballroom

Event chronology
| ← Previous; Chapter 187: Vendetta 3 | Next → Chapter 189: In Darkest Night |

Unboxing chronology
| ← Previous; Chapter 175: Unboxing VII: The Curtain Call | Next → — |

The Chapter 188: Unboxing VIII: The Search For Socks was a professional wrestling event produced by Progress Wrestling. It took place on 28 December 2025, in London, England, at the Electric Ballroom.

Eight matches were contested at the event. In the main event, Rayne Leverkusen defeated Kanji to retain the Progress World Women's Championship.

== Production ==
=== Storylines ===
The event included matches that each resulted from scripted storylines, where wrestlers portrayed heroes, villains, or less distinguishable characters in scripted events that built tension and culminated in a wrestling match or series of matches. Results were predetermined by Progress' creative writers, while storylines were produced on Progress' events airing on the Demand PROGRESS streaming service.

As the "Unboxing" category of Progress Chapters tradition hints, the pay-per-view's entire match card was revealed on the night of the event.

=== Event ===
The event started with the singles confrontation between Ricky Sosa and Tommy Tanner, solded with the victory of the latter. The second bout saw Alexxis falcon picking up a victory over Rhio, Lana Austin, Maddie Morgan, Harley Hudson and Hollie Barlow in a six-way scramble. The third bout saw Bullit outmatching Charles Crowley in singles competition. In the fourth match, Gene Munny and Kouga picked up a victory over Mark Trew and Kieron Lacey in tag team competition. Next up, Drilla Moloney defeated Spike Trivet in singles competition. The sixth bout saw Chuck Mambo, TK Cooper, Simon Miller and Drew Parker pick up a victory over Kid Lykos, Kid Lykos II, Josh Holly and Scott Oberman in eight-man tag team competition. In the semi main event, Man Like DeReiss defeated Robbie X to secure the tenth consecutive defense of the PROGRESS World Championship in that respective reign. After the bout concluded, DeReiss nominated Cara Noir as his next title challenger.

In the main event, Rayne Leverkusen defeated Kanji to secure the third consecutive defense of the Progress World Women's Championship in that respective reign. After the bout concluded, Leverkusen was challenged by Alexxis Falcon to a title match.

== Results ==
| No. | Results | Stipulations | Times |
|---|---|---|---|
| 1 | Tommy Tanner defeated Ricky Sosa by pinfall | Singles match | — |
| 2 | Alexxis Falcon defeated Lana Austin, Hollie Barlow, Rhio, Maddie Morgan, and Harley Hudson by pinfall | Six-way scramble | 10:20 |
| 3 | Bullit defeated Charles Crowley by pinfall | Singles match | 7:54 |
| 4 | Kouga and Gene Munny (with Session Moth Martina) defeated Mark Trew and Kieron Lacey by pinfall | Tag team match | 7:02 |
| 5 | Drilla Moloney defeated Spike Trivet by pinfall | Singles match | 13:07 |
| 6 | Drew Parker, Simon Miller, and Sunshine Machine (Chuck Mambo and TK Cooper) defeated Josh Holly, Scott Oberman, and Lykos Gym (Kid Lykos and Kid Lykos II) by pinfall | Eight-man tag team match | 15:18 |
| 7 | Man Like DeReiss (c) defeated Robbie X by pinfall | Singles match for the PROGRESS World Championship | 15:30 |
| 8 | Rayne Leverkusen (c) defeated Kanji by pinfall | Singles match for the Progress World Women's Championship | 20:34 |
(c) / – the champion(s) heading into the match
