= Progress Chapter 187: Vendetta 3 =

2025 Progress Wrestling event

Chapter 187: Vendetta 3
- Promotional poster of the event
- Promotion: Progress Wrestling
- Date: 30 November 2025
- City: London, England
- Venue: Electric Ballroom

Event chronology
← Previous; Chapter 186: Noisy Neighbours	Next → Chapter 188: Unboxing VIII: The Search For Socks

The Chapter 187: Vendetta 3 was a professional wrestling event produced by Progress Wrestling. It took place on 30 November 2025 in London, England, at the Electric Ballroom.

Eight matches were contested at the event. In the main event, Man Like DeReiss defeated Tate Mayfairs to retain the PROGRESS World Championship.

== Production ==
=== Storylines ===
The event included matches that each resulted from scripted storylines, where wrestlers portrayed heroes, villains, or less distinguishable characters in scripted events that built tension and culminated in a wrestling match or series of matches. Results were predetermined by Progress' creative writers, while storylines were produced on Progress' events airing on the Demand PROGRESS streaming service.

=== Event ===
The event started with the singles confrontation between Jay Joshua and Cara Noir solded with the victory of the latter. Next up, Lio Rush picked up a victory over Tommy Tanner and Scott Oberman in three-way competition. The third bout saw Kouga and Gene Munny outmatch Kid Lykos and Kid Lykos II in tag team competition. Next up, Charlie Sterling defeated Simon Miller in singles competition. The fifth bout saw Alexxis Falcon picking up a victory over Miyu Yamashita in another singles confrontation. Next up, Connor Mills and Nico Angelo defeated Chuck Mambo and TK Cooper to secure the first successful defense of the Progress Tag Team Championship in that respective reign. In the semi main event, Rayne Leverkusen defeated Emersyn Jayne to secure the second consecutive defense of the Progress World Women's Championship in that respective reign.

In the main event, Man Like DeReiss defeated Tate Mayfairs to secure the seventh consecutive defense of the PROGRESS World Championship in that respective reign.

== Results ==
No.	Results	Stipulations	Times
1	Cara Noir defeated Jay Joshua by pinfall	Singles match	11:11
2	Lio Rush defeated Tommy Tanner and Scott Oberman by pinfall	Three-way match	9:26
3	Kouga and Gene Munny (with Session Moth Martina) defeated Lykos Gym (Kid Lykos and Kid Lykos II) by pinfall	Tag team match	10:16
4	Charlie Sterling defeated Simon Miller by pinfall	Singles match	3:34
5	Alexxis Falcon defeated Miyu Yamashita by pinfall	Singles match	12:23
6	Diamond Eyes (Connor Mills and Nico Angelo) (c) defeated Sunshine Machine (Chuck Mambo and TK Cooper) by pinfall	Tag team match for the Progress Tag Team Championship	12:00
7	Rayne Leverkusen (c) defeated Emersyn Jayne by pinfall	Singles match for the Progress World Women's Championship	11:56
8	Man Like DeReiss (c) defeated Tate Mayfairs by pinfall	Singles match for the PROGRESS World Championship	27:28
(c) / – the champion(s) heading into the match
