= Progress Chapter 185: Jump In The Line =

2025 Progress Wrestling event

Chapter 185: Jump In The Line
- Promotional poster of the event
- Promotion: Progress Wrestling
- Date: 26 October 2025
- City: London, England
- Venue: Electric Ballroom
- Attendance: cca. 600

Event chronology
← Previous; Chapter 184: Camden Lock Up	Next → Chapter 186: Noisy Neighbours

The Chapter 185: Jump In The Line was a professional wrestling event produced by Progress Wrestling. It took place on 26 October 2025 in London, England, at the Electric Ballroom.

== Production ==
=== Storylines ===
The event included matches that each resulted from scripted storylines, where wrestlers portrayed heroes, villains, or less distinguishable characters in scripted events that built tension and culminated in a wrestling match or series of matches. Results were predetermined by Progress' creative writers, while storylines were produced on Progress' events airing on the Demand PROGRESS streaming service.

=== Event ===
The event started with the singles confrontation between Owadasan and Gene Munny solded with the victory of the latter. Next up, Anita Vaughan and Safire Reed picked up a victory over Lana Austin and Hollie Barlow in tag team competition. The third bout saw Simon Miller defeat Mulligan in singles competition. Next up, Rayne Leverkusen defeated Rhio to win the Progress World Women's Championship, ending the latter's reign at 175 days and four defenses. The fifth bout saw Will Kroos defeate Charles Crowley to secure the second consecutive defense of the Progress Atlas Championship in that respective reign. In the semi main event, Man Like DeReiss defeated Lio Rush to secure the fifth consecutive defense of the PROGRESS World Championship in that respective reign.

In the main event, Connor Mills and Nico Angelo defeated reigning champions Kid Lykos and Kid Lykos II to win the PROGRESS Tag Team Championship in a three-way match also involving Chuck Mambo and TK Cooper, ending Lykos Gym's reign at 119 days and three defenses.

== Results ==
No.	Results	Stipulations
1	Hyperactive (Anita Vaughan and Safire Reed) defeated Lallie (Lana Austin and Hollie Barlow) by pinfall	Tag team match
2	Gene Munny (with Session Moth Martina) defeated Owadasan by pinfall	Singles match
3	Simon Miller defeated Mulligan (with Josh Holly) by pinfall	Singles match
4	Rayne Leverkusen defeated Rhio (c) by pinfall	Singles match for the Progress World Women's Championship
5	Will Kroos (c) defeated Charles Crowley by pinfall	Singles match for the Progress Atlas Championship
6	Man Like DeReiss (c) defeated Lio Rush by pinfall	Singles match for the PROGRESS World Championship
7	Diamond Eyes (Connor Mills and Nico Angelo) defeated Lykos Gym (Kid Lykos and Kid Lykos II) (c) and Sunshine Machine (Chuck Mambo and TK Cooper)	Three-way tag team ladder match for the PROGRESS Tag Team Championship
(c) / – the champion(s) heading into the match
