= Progress Chapter 186: Noisy Neighbours =

2025 Progress Wrestling event

Chapter 186: Noisy Neighbours
- Promotional poster of the event
- Promotion: Progress Wrestling
- Date: 16 November 2025
- City: Manchester, England
- Venue: The O_{2} Ritz

Event chronology
← Previous; Chapter 185: Jump In The Line	Next → Chapter 187: Vendetta 3

The Chapter 186: Noisy Neighbours was a professional wrestling event produced by Progress Wrestling. It took place on 16 November 2025 in Manchester, England, at The O_{2} Ritz.

== Production ==
=== Storylines ===
The event included matches that each resulted from scripted storylines, where wrestlers portrayed heroes, villains, or less distinguishable characters in scripted events that built tension and culminated in a wrestling match or series of matches. Results were predetermined by Progress' creative writers, while storylines were produced on Progress' events airing on the Demand PROGRESS streaming service.

=== Event ===
The event started with the preshow singles confrontation between Dean Allmark and Kouga, solded with the victory of the latter. In the first main card bout, Tom Thelwell defeated Luke Jacobs in singles action. Next up, Ethan Allen picked up a victory over Adam Maxted in another singles bout. The fourth match saw Tate Mayfaira outmatch Kid Lykos in singles competition. In the fifth match, Rayne Leverkusen defeated Session Moth Martina to secure the first successful defense of the Progress World Women's Championship in that respective reign. Next up, Scott Oberman defeated Drew Parker in singles competition. The seventh bout portrayed the victory of Charles Crowley over RPD. In the semi main event, Will Kroos defeated Jay Joshua to secure the third consecutive defense of the Progress Atlas Championship in that respective reign.

In the main event, Cara Noir defeated Lio Rush in singles competition.

== Results ==
No.	Results	Stipulations	Times
1^{P}	Kouga defeated Dean Allmark by pinfall	Singles match	—
2	Luke Jacobs defeated Tom Thelwell by pinfall	Singles match	11:38
3	Ethan Allen defeated Adam Maxted by pinfall	Singles match	3:48
4	Tate Mayfairs defeated Kid Lykos by pinfall	Singles match	13:28
5	Rayne Leverkusen (c) defeated Session Moth Martina (with Kouga) by pinfall	Singles match for the Progress World Women's Championship	10:10
6	Scott Oberman defeated Drew Parker by pinfall	Singles match	9:39
7	Charles Crowley defeated RPD by pinfall	Singles match	6:41
8	Will Kroos (c) defeated Jay Joshua by pinfall	Singles match for the Progress Atlas Championship	9:50
9	Cara Noir defeated Lio Rush by pinfall	Singles match	19:11
(c) / – the champion(s) heading into the match; P / – the match was broadcast on the pre-show
