= Edward Dennis =

Edward Dennis may refer to:

- Eddie Dennis, wrestler
- Edward Dennis (MP) for Yarmouth (Isle of Wight) (UK Parliament constituency)
