= Jay Joshua =

Welsh professional wrestler (born 1995)

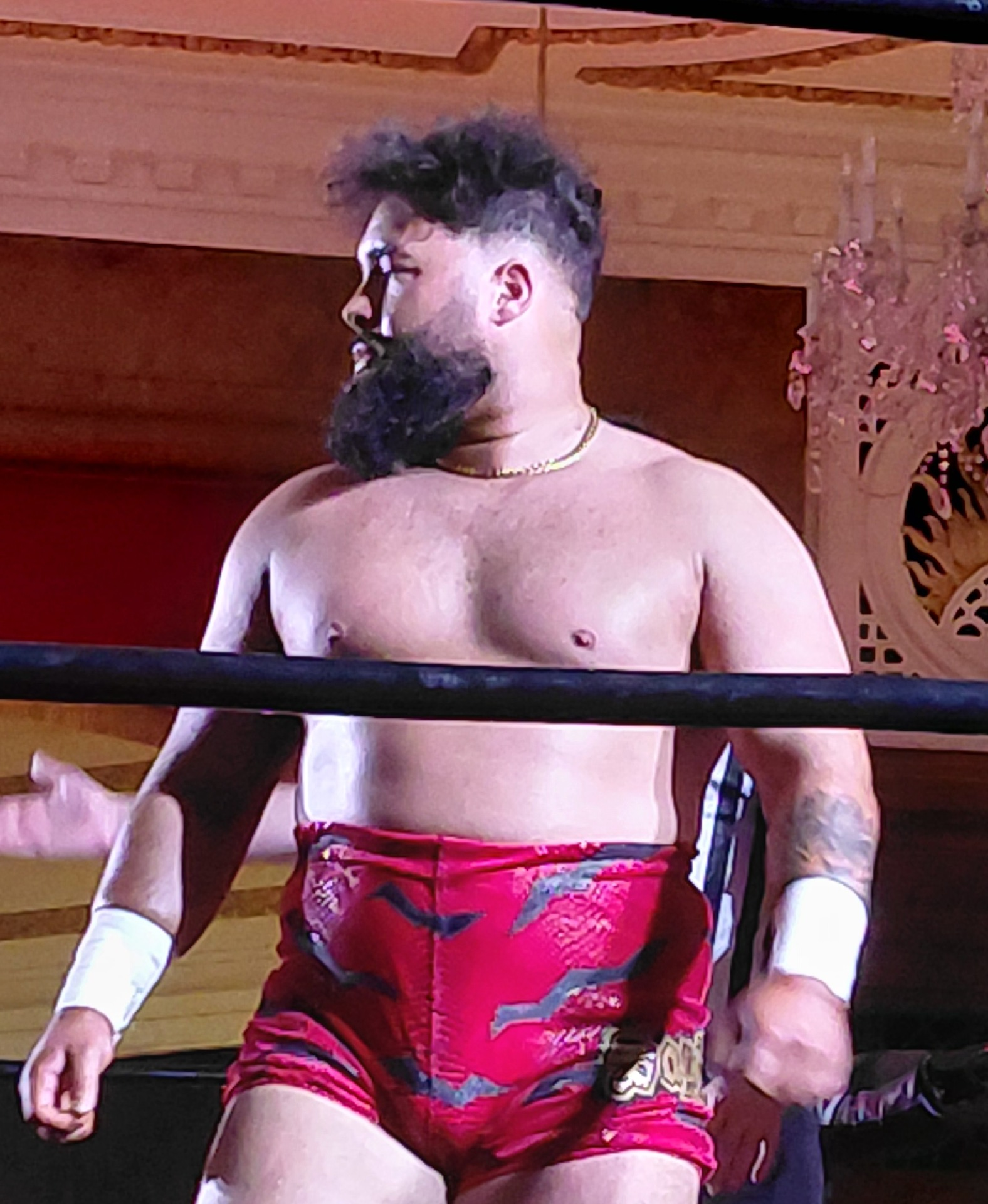
- Joshua in October 2025

Personal information
- Born: November 22, 1995 (age 30) Cardiff, Wales

Professional wrestling career
- Ring name: Joshua Joseph Jay Jewell Jay Joshua
- Billed height: 5 ft 9 in (1.75 m)
- Billed weight: 107 kg (236 lb)
- Billed from: Cardiff, Wales
- Trained by: Dragon Pro Wrestling Academy
- Debut: December 3, 2017

Jay Joshua (born November 22, 1995) is a Welsh professional wrestler. He performs on the British independent circuit – predominantly for Revolution Pro Wrestling (RevPro), where he is a former one-time Undisputed British Heavyweight Champion.

== Professional wrestling career ==
=== British independent circuit (2017–present) ===
Joshua made his professional wrestling debut at DPW Ultraviolet, an event promoted by Dragon Pro Wrestling on December 3, 2017, under the ring name of "Jay Jewel" by teaming up with Jayson Bishop to unsuccessfully challenge The Brotherhood (Elijah and Joe Mezinger) for the Dragon Pro Tag Team Championship. Joshua is known for his tenure with various promotions from the British independent scene such as Attack! Pro Wrestling, TNT Extreme Wrestling, WrestleForce and others.

=== Revolution Pro Wrestling (2024–present) ===
Joshua made his debut in Revolution Pro Wrestling at RevPro Live In London 87 on July 7, 2024, where he fell short to Ricky Knight Jr. During his time with the promotion, he has chased for various accomplishments. At RevPro Uprising 2024, he teamed up with Connor Mills to defeat (Chuck Mambo and TK Cooper) for the Undisputed British Tag Team Championship. One year later at RevPro Uprising 2025, Joshua defeated Sha Samuels to win the Undisputed British Heavyweight Championship.

Joshua competed in various of the promotion's signature events. In the Great British Tag League, he made his first appearance at the 2025 edition in which he teamed up with Connor Mills, placing themselves in the B block and scoring a total of nine points, topping the block after going against the teams of Sons of Southhampton (David Francisco and JJ Gale), Kieron Lacey and Mark Trew, and CPF (Danny Black and Joe Lando). Joshua and Mills then defeated Cowboy Way (1 Called Manders and Thomas Shire) in the finals to win the tournament which occurred at RevPro 13th Anniversary Show: Night 2.

In the Global Wars UK branch of events, Joshua made his first appearance at the 2024 edition where he teamed up with Gabe Kidd and Connor Mills in a losing effort against Hiroshi Tanahashi, Leon Slater, and Zozaya. At the 2025 edition, he fell short to Tomohiro Ishii in singles competition.

In Fantastica Mania, Joshua competed for the first time in the 2025 Fantastica Mania: UK event where he defeated Difunto on the first night, then teamed up with Último Guerrero and Connor Mills to defeat CPF (Danny Black, Joe Lando and Maverick Mayhem) on the second night.

In the RevPro High Stakes branch of events, Mills competed for the first time at the 2025 edition, where he competed in a won by JJ Gale and also involving David Francisco, Robbie X, Stephen Wolf and Zozaya.

=== Progress Wrestling (2025–present) ===
Joshua made his debut in Progress Wrestling in the promotion's "Chapter" flagship events, at Chapter 186: Noisy Neighbours on November 16, 2025, where he unsuccessfully challenged Will Kroos for the Progress Atlas Championship. At Chapter 187: Vendetta 3 on November 30, 2025, he fell short to Cara Noir.

== Championships and accomplishments ==
- Attack! Pro Wrestling
  - Attack! Championship (1 time)
- Dragon Pro Wrestling
  - Dragon Pro Tag Team Championship (1 time) – with Sid Oakley
- Evolution Wrestling
  - Evolution Middleweight Championship (1 time)
  - EVW Tag Team Championship (1 time) – with Oliver Sudden
- International Wrestling Network
  - FNW Z-Force Championship (1 time)
- New Wave Wrestling
  - NWW Championship (1 time)
- No Mercy Wrestling
  - No Mercy Wrestling Championship (1 time)
- Pro Wrestling Chaos
  - PWC Internet Championship (1 time)
- Pro Wrestling Illustrated
  - Ranked No. 95 of the top 500 singles wrestlers in the PWI 500 in 2026
- Revolution Pro Wrestling
  - Undisputed British Heavyweight Championship (1 time)
  - British Tag Team Championship (1 time) – with Connor Mills
  - Great British Tag League (2025) – with Connor Mills
- WrestleForce
  - WrestleForce Tag Team Championship (1 time) – with Billy Haze
