= Attack! Pro Wrestling =

Welsh professional wrestling promotion

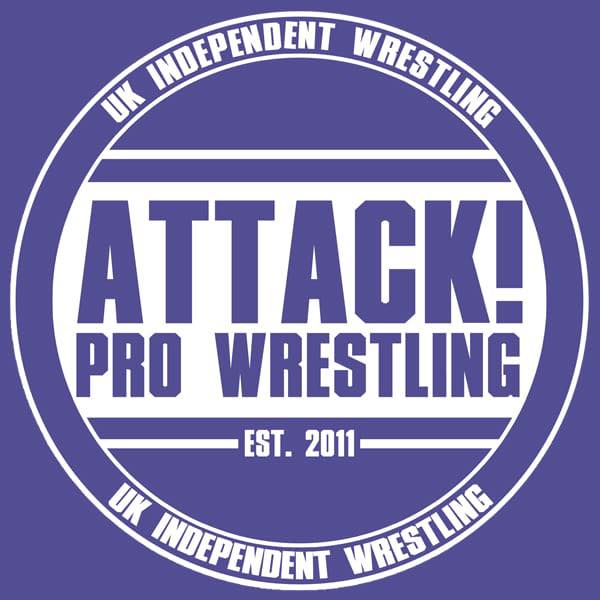
- Acronym: ATTACK!
- Founded: 2011
- Style: Professional wrestling Sports entertainment
- Headquarters: Cardiff, Wales, United Kingdom
- Founder(s): Pete Dunne; Jim Lee
- Owner(s): Mark Andrews; Martyn John
- Website: attackprowrestling.com

Attack Pro Wrestling (stylized as ATTACK! Pro Wrestling) is a Welsh professional wrestling promotion owned and operated by wrestler Mark Andrews.

Although ATTACK was originally established in 2011 by wrestler Pete Dunne and ring announcer Jim Lee, from February 2012 the promotion became solely owned by Dunne (when Jim stepped-down as co-owner/promoter), with the events managed by a regularly-changing collective of British wrestlers in the subsequent years (including Dunne, Andrews and Chris Brookes). Mark Andrews then assumed ownership and sole control of the promotion in January 2023. It was later revealed in June 2025 that regular ATTACK! commentator Martyn John was a co-owner of the company alongside Mark.

It was nominated for the award of "UK/Ireland Promotion of the Year" at the Fighting Spirit Magazine Readers Awards 2016.

== Style ==
The promotion is known for combining high-quality independent wrestling with "some of the most creative shows the British Wrestling scene has ever seen"; including innovative themed shows (such as the video game themed show 'Press Start'), unique characters (such as an amorous French mouse named 'Love Making Demon'), and bizarre twists (such as referees and soft toys winning Championship belts).

== History ==
=== Formation & 2011 ===
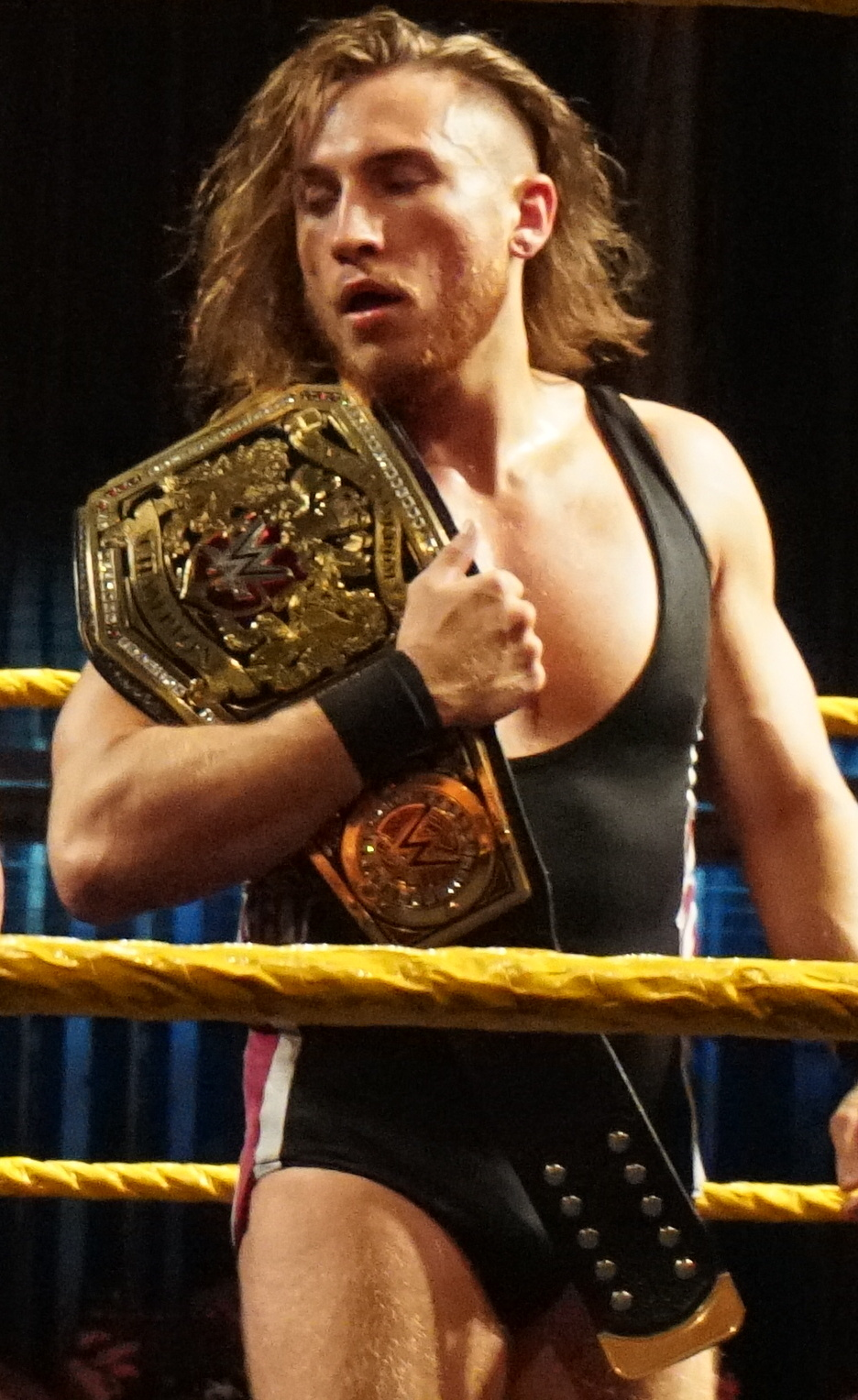
ATTACK's original founder was Pete Dunne.

Attack! Pro Wrestling was founded in 2011 by Pete Dunne and Jim Lee. Having originally met at a wrestling training school in Coventry in 2006, the duo founded Attack! as a means to create more exposure for their group of friends on the British independent wrestling scene, at a time when Pete and his contemporaries (such as Mark Andrews and Eddie Dennis) were first starting to gain work around the United Kingdom. Using primarily upcoming British junior heavyweight wrestlers, their concept was to showcase internationally influenced "fast-paced, hard-hitting" independent wrestling, with a unique creative approach.

The first events were held in August 2011, in community centre venues in Pete's hometown of Birmingham. The debut weekend was originally planned to consist of three shows, but was reduced to two shows at short notice, after one of the venues was damaged in the 2011 England Riots. The events featured a roster of wrestlers entirely from Pete and Jim's immediate circle of friends, and was headlined by the first "Elder Stein Invitational Tournament", which was won by Mark Andrews (overcoming Pete in the final). Attack returned for three further events in Birmingham in November 2011, which included Zack Sabre Jr's first appearances for the promotion.

=== 2012–2014 ===
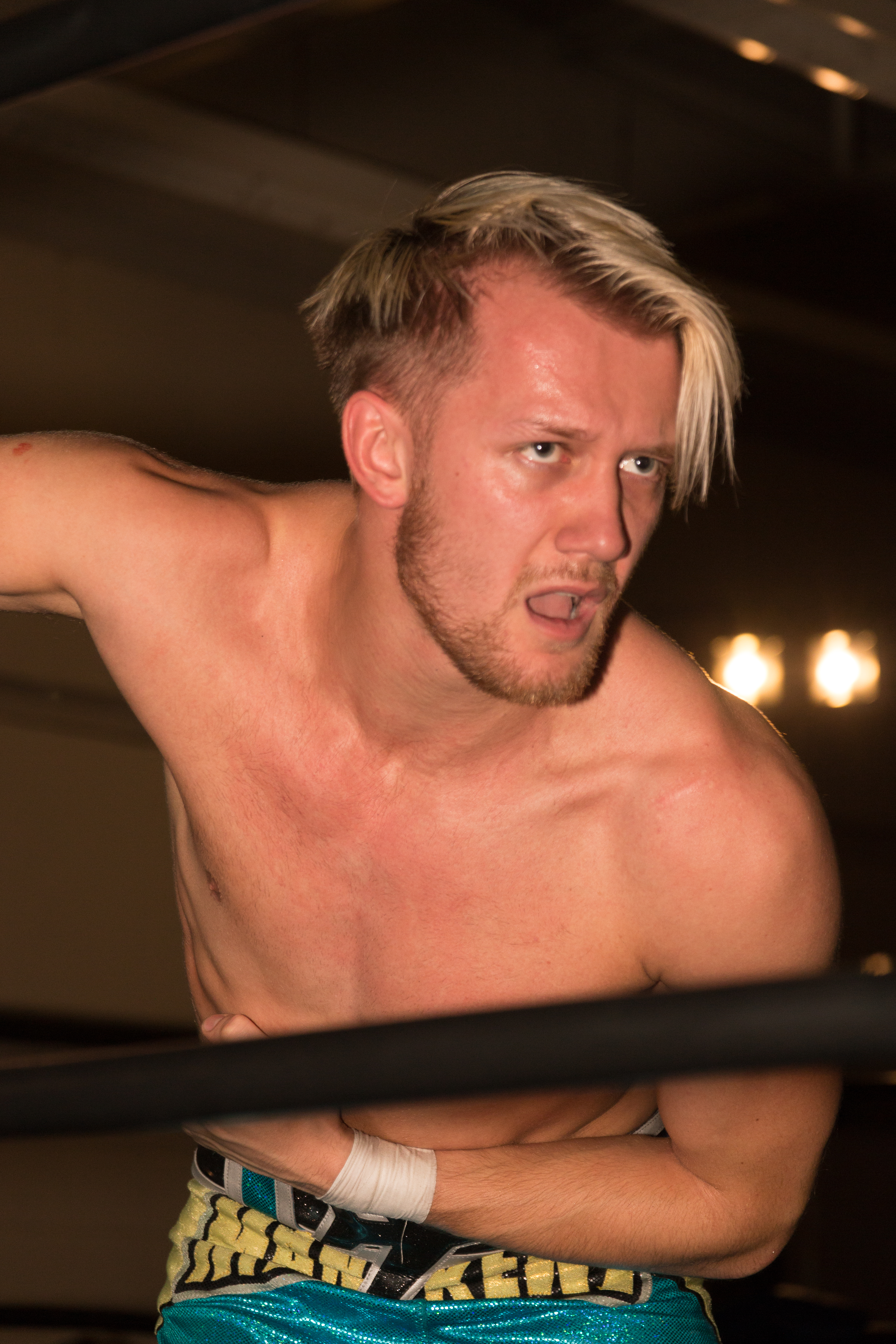
Under Mark Andrews influence, the promotion relocated to Cardiff, Wales which then became its permanent home.

In February 2012, Attack held an event for the first time in Cardiff, with Mark Andrews joining Pete and Jim in organising events. The show was held at Cathays Community Centre; a venue of nostalgic relevance to the group (as many years previously Pete, Jim and Mark used to set up a re-purposed boxing ring to practice in the hall during the school holidays). The show was titled "We Do It For The Money, Obviously", as a dig at existing promoters from the region who had tried to stop the event going ahead, and was held in aid of local charity Recovery Cymru. The sold-out event was headlined by Pete Dunne vs Mark Andrews; an encounter which would be repeated many times over at Attack in the following years. Jim Lee stepped down from his position as Attack co-promoter after the event as a result of other commitments, handing control to Pete and Mark alone.

In December 2012, Attack also began to run shows in Bristol, with local wrestler Sebastian Radclaw temporarily joining the promoting team to help arrange events in the city. Bristol has since been Attack's second most-frequent show location, after Cardiff.

Attack continued to hold regular events in Cardiff, where they became known for hosting innovative 'themed' wrestling shows. Beginning with a Halloween-themed event named 'GooseBUMPS' in October 2012 (in which Pete Dunne defeated Eddie Dennis to win the second annual Elder Stein Invitational Tournament), the themed events then came to prominence in February 2013 with the video-game-themed event, Press Start. The Press Start event involved members of the Attack roster in video game fancy dress; including the Hunter Brothers as the Mario Bros., Mark Andrews as Pikachu, and Ryan Smile & Eddie Dennis as Sonic & Knuckles. The DVD trailer went viral, originally amassing over 32,000 views; exposing Attack! Pro Wrestling to a much wider audience than before.

Further themed shows since have included "Stiffler's House Party" (based on teen comedy movies), "We're Gonna Need A Bigger Boat" (a beach/nautical-themed show, featuring former ROH Wrestling TV & World Champion Jay Lethal), "Under The MistleTour" (Attack's yearly festive-themed shows), "Not Another SUPER Show" (with a superhero and supervillain theme), and "Now That's What I Call Wrestling! 37" (a pop music themed show). Wrestlers and fans regularly dress up at the shows, with prizes given to the best costumes.

In December 2013, Attack! introduced the Attack! Pro Wrestling 24/7 Championship as their first championship title. The wrestler holding the belt can be pinned or submitted at any time, which has resulted in the belt changing hands frequently; occasionally between shows. The first winner was Sebastian Radclaw, who won the title in a TLC match at Under The MistleTour 2013 Night One, in the final of the third Elder Stein Invitational. Radclaw would lose the title shortly after the conclusion of the show, before winning it back at Under The MistleTour 2013 Night Two, then losing it again almost immediately to Referee Chris Roberts. In total, there were 16 different Championship reigns between the title's introduction on 20 December 2013 and the end of that calendar year.

=== 2015 ===
Over time, Attack! Pro Wrestling have increasingly incorporated long-term story arcs into their events. The most notable story to-date has involved the dominance of Pete Dunne's heel persona, which began in January 2015, at a show titled "Mandrews Goes To America". The show was styled as a farewell to Mark Andrews, who was set to leave the United Kingdom having signed a contract with TNA Wrestling. Mark faced long-time friend Pete Dunne in the main event, in a face vs face encounter; only for Pete to unexpectedly Attack Mark at the conclusion of the match. This was the launchpad for Pete's "Young & Bitter" persona, and later, his "Bruiserweight" persona. Pete went on to win the Attack! 24/7 Championship at the following event, "Attack! Wrestling To Make Love To" on 14 February 2015. His unprecedented dominance over the championship would remain a primary story device for 2015 and 2016.

February 2015 also saw Attack! Pro Wrestling run a series of events in conjunction with Pontins Holiday Parks, across five consecutive days.

Attack! introduced a Tag Team Championship for the first time in March 2015, with 'Wonderland of Wrestle' (Super Santos Sr & Elephant Mask) defeating the 'Anti-Fun Police' in the final of a Championship Tournament to become inaugural champions. The pair would hold the championships for almost the entirety of 2015.

In April 2015, American independent wrestling promotion Chikara invited Attack! Pro Wrestling to host a pre-show event before the Cardiff leg of their UK tour. The two promotions have maintained a friendship since, with Chikara publicly endorsing Attack! Pro Wrestling on a number of occasions.

For much of the second half of 2015, Eddie Dennis would chase Pete Dunne for the Attack! Pro Wrestling 24/7 Championship, only for Pete Dunne to repeatedly dodge Eddie. Meanwhile, Wild Boar would go on an unbeaten streak for the entire year in the promotion. Both stories built to a crescendo at Under The MistleTour 2015, in December that year. At Under The MistleTour 2015 Night One, Wild Boar defeated Morgan Webster to win the 2015 Elder Stein Invitational Tournament, after which Eddie would defeat Pete to win the 24/7 Championship. Eddie immediately declared his intent to put his new title on the line against Wild Boar the following night, at Under The MistleTour 2015 Night Two; a match which Wild Boar won, to finish 2015 undefeated in Attack! and its 24/7 Champion. The Tag Team Championships also changed hands that evening, with Wonderland of Wrestle losing the titles of The Brothers of Construction (known elsewhere in the country as the Hunter Brothers).

=== 2016 ===
After another handful of shows at Pontins to start 2016, Attack! then returned to one of its core venues of Cathays Community Centre on 17 January 2016, for an '80s-themed event named "It Was Acceptable In The 80's". The event saw a change of both championships again. The Brothers of Construction lost the Tag Team Championships to the team of #CCK (Chris Brookes & Mondai Lykos), before a duo of changes in the Attack! 24/7 Championship; with new champ Wild Boar losing the belt to Eddie Dennis, who would again lose it immediately to Pete Dunne.

By this stage, the story arc focused on the battle of the Attack! Pro Wrestling 24/7 Championship had become a three-way affair, with Eddie Dennis and Wild Boar both seeking to end Pete Dunne's largely uninterrupted hold on the title. It was announced that Attack! Pro Wrestling would hold their biggest event to date at Walkabout Cardiff on 3 April 2016, titled "How Do You Learn To Fall Off A 20ft Ladder?", which would be headlined by a Triple Threat match between the trio.

The sold-out event was later nominated by readers of Fighting Spirit Magazine in the category of "UK/Ireland Show of the Year" in the 2016 FSM Reader Awards, with Tyler Bate vs Travis Banks from the show also receiving a nomination for "UK/Ireland Match of the Year". During the show, the Anti-Fun Police team of Damian Dunne and Ryan Smile would split, after several weeks of dissent in the ranks; with Ryan turning face. The Tag Team Championship changed hands, with Bayside High (Mark Andrews & Nixon Newell defeating #CCK, before a main event in which Pete Dunne would defeat Wild Boar and Eddie Dennis to retain the Attack! 24/7 Championship. Following the conclusion of the match, Referee Shay Purser would unexpectedly pin Pete Dunne to win the Championship, with the pinfall counted by ring announcer Jim Lee. This would begin a major story arc of a rivalry between Pete and Jim for much of 2016.

At the following event, 'Press Start 4' on 3 June 2016, it was announced that Attack would crown an Attack! Pro Wrestling Champion for the first time, with a tournament to decide the winner. Two first-round matches were held that evening, with Eddie Dennis and Wild Boar advancing to the semi-finals, at the expense of Tyler Bate and Travis Banks respectively. At the conclusion of the show, Pete Dunne attacked Jim Lee from behind with a steel chair, after which Jim Lee announced via the Attack! Pro Wrestling Facebook page that he would be stepping down from his position as ring announcer with immediate effect. Attack! Pro Wrestling would later (kayfabe) suspend Pete Dunne for his actions.

The Attack! Pro Wrestling Championship Tournament continued at the next event on 1 July 2016, with Mike Bird advancing over Zack Sabre Jr, and Super Santos Sr advancing over Charlie Garrett. After the match, Santos would align himself with the Anti-Fun Police, renaming himself Los Federales Santos Sr.

Attack! Pro Wrestling returned to their largest venue, Walkabout Cardiff, on 21 August 2016, for an event named "(Thank God It's Not) WinterSlam". It was announced that the event would be headlined by a TLC Match for the Tag Team Championships, between holders Bayside High and challengers #CCK; and that Pete Dunne would have his suspension lifted at the event, where he would wrestle El Ligero. The event also featured Mike Bird and Eddie Dennis advancing through their semi-final matches in the Attack! Pro Wrestling Championship tournament, defeating Los Federales Santos Sr and Wild Boar respectively. Following Pete Dunne's match with El Ligeo, Pete began to assault referee Shay Purser, before former ring announcer Jim Lee (in attendance as a fan) jumped the barrier to fight Pete off; with Jim announcing that he was making his return to Attack! Pro Wrestling. The event concluded with #CCK winning the Tag Team Championships from Bayside High.

Over a series of events that followed, various elements of the Attack! Pro roster would align themselves with either Pete or Jim. Nixon Newell turned on tag team partner Mark Andrews at "Attack! Pro's Not Dead" in September 2016, aligning herself with Pete; setting in motion a series of events that would lead to the announcement of a five-vs-five elimination match at Attack! Pro Wrestling's return to Walkabout Cardiff in November 2016, titled "Seriously? Another PPV Tie-In Event". Jim's team, titled the #JimLeegion, included himself, Mark Andrews, Martin Kirby, El Ligero, and one mystery partner; whilst Pete Dunne's team was announced as himself, Nixon Newell, Chris Bookes, Mondai Lykos and one mystery partner. It was also announced that Eddie Dennis and Mike Bird would compete in the final of the Attack! Pro Wrestling Championship Tournament at the event.

The show, held on 20 November 2016, was opened with the match to crown the first-ever Attack! Pro Wrestling Champion, with Eddie Dennis overcoming Mike Bird to win the title. Following the match, Wild Boar would align himself with Mike Bird; forming a heel team known as "Bird + Boar", having previously appeared regularly together under the name at Insane Championship Wrestling. Ahead of the main event, an exchange in the ring between Pete Dunne and Jim Lee resulted in a stipulation for the match whereby the losing team's captain would need to leave Attack! Pro Wrestling for good. Jim Lee announced his team's mystery fifth member as Attack's regular referee Shay Purser; only for Shay to immediately turn heel by low-blowing Jim to align himself with Pete's team. Eddie Dennis would come out to become the new fifth member of the #JimLeegion as the match began. Gradual eliminations left Pete Dunne and Jim Lee as the two sole competitors remaining in the match, which concluded with Pete tapping out to Jim; ending his tenure in Attack! Pro Wrestling.

Attack! held their annual Under The MistleTour shows in December 2016, with Night One headlined by Eddie Dennis making his first successful Championship defence, defeating Damian Dunne. #CCK would also lose their Tag Team Championships at the event to the team of Bowl-a-Rama (Splits McPins & Lloyd Katt). The following night saw the conclusion of the long-running feud between Anti-Fun Police leader Damian Dunne and former member Ryan Smile; with Smile emerging victorious.

=== 2017–2018 ===
Attack! Pro Wrestling began 2017 by co-promoting an event with Fight Club: Pro in Wolverhampton, titled "Attack! Club Pro: #Wrestlehouse". The event featured various members of the Attack! and Fight Club rosters in action, headlined by Dan Moloney & Pete Dunne (who, despite being banned from Attack, was permitted to compete due to being an active member of the Fight Club roster) vs Trent Seven & Tyler Bate; significant due to the fact that all four men were scheduled to compete in the WWE United Kingdom Championship Tournament one week later. Notably, the event would finish with an impromptu six-man tag-team match between #CCK & Referee Shay Purser vs Moustache Mountain & Referee Joel Allen. With no referees left in the building, a paying spectator named Warren was unexpectedly brought into the ring to referee the match. Joel Allen would win the Attack! 24/7 Championship at the end of the encounter, only for Moustache Mountain to assist Warren in then pinning Joel to win the belt.

In 2018, Attack held its first show in London with the 'Live At The Dome' from The Dome at Tufnell Park in London.

One of the biggest developments of the year mainly revolved around Nothing To Prove. They gained new additions with Love Making Demon turning on the fans and revealing himself as Chuck Mambo, as well as Eddie Dennis being revealed as the ringleader of the faction. Lloyd Katt also turned on his partner Splits McPins and at the end of the year retiring him in a career VS career match, resulting in this being the last ever match of Split McPins, who was revealed as Matt Horgan.

Nothing To Prove also feuded with the Anti-Fun Police, originally leading them disbanning for a majority of 2018. During the Under The MistleTour show, Damien challenged Eddie Dennis for the Attack! Championship with the added stipulations of the Anti-Fun Police being reinstated if he won the title, or him leaving Attack if his losing streak continued. During the match, Ryan Smile returned as part of the Anti-Fun Police and faced off Nothing to prove along with the rest of the AFP, leading to Dunne winning the championship once again and reinstating his stable.

Due to the restrictions of WWE NXT UK talent not being able to compete in most independent promotions at the end of the year, names like Pete Dunne, Tyler Bate and some other names linked with NXT UK would compete in their final matches during the Under The MistleTour 2018 shows. As such, Pete Dunne vacated the Attack! 24/7 Championship on the 15 December Cardiff show.

=== 2019 ===
In 2019, the reformation of Nothing To Prove began as Chuck Mumbo broke away from the group, Drew Parker moved to Japan towards the middle of 2019 and Eddie Dennis stopped appearing regularly for Attack. However, a new Illuminati-themed stable known as 'The Kabal' soon took the mantle of the biggest antagonistic force. While no true head leader had been revealed, one of the more Protestant members named Musmortus won the 24/7 Championship on 7 April 2019 at My Sacrifice 3, while fan favourite Shay Purser revealed himself to be one of the key figure heads of the group, renaming himself to M. Shay Ultra and would then win the Attack! Championship on 14 July 2019 at the RaffleMania 3 show. Two other members of the Kabal named Asmodeus and Azaroth would chase after the Attack! Tag Team Championships around the same time. At the end of 2019, Shay Purser ended up turning against The Kabal and aligning to the side of good once more.

One side story to appear during many of the different shows throughout 2019 was the focus on other wrestling talent who would help out as ring crew during different Attack shows. These mostly featured Sid Oakley and Clay McLeod who were dubbed as the 'Ring Crew Express' while sometimes swapping one/both of the two out for someone else helping out at the show, such as August Jackson, Billy Haze and Tim Lee. They would usually face off against Experiment In Terror (ELIJAH & LK Mezinger), formerly of Nothing To Prove in defeat. However, during a story stift which saw LK Mezinger have interruptions of his old Bowl-a-Rama gimmick as Lloyd Katt, Oakley and McLeod would defeat Experiment in Terror at both RaffleMania shows in July 2019. Eventually, they would end up winning a shot at the Attack! Tag Team Championship Titles, which August Jackson and Sid Oakley under the 'Ring Crew Express' banner ended up winning.

=== 2020-2021 ===
In early 2020, a new annual tournament was introduce called the Annual Embassy Bingo Cathays Invitational Classic. Connor Mills was crowned its first winner in a one night tournament on 25 January at the Cathays Community Centre (the venue of the building which the tournament was named after). It was also announced at this show that the Kris Travis Tag Team Invitational would also be making a return later in the year. Many of their live events would stop after their Road To Sacrifice show on 14 March due to the United Kingdom heavily enforcing the regulations due to the COVID-19 Pandemic halting the world's events which would last for several months, effectively cancelling their My Sacrifice IV show as well as other future planned shows.

As the Pandemic went on with no further content being created, it was announced that Attack! would essentially be closed around April 2021 due to Pete Dunne (one of the owners at the time) being unable to prioritise the promotion while working in the States and the pandemic was still ongoing.

=== Return in 2023-2024 ===
On Saturday 21 January 2023 during what was initially booked as event called 'Mark Andrew's Super Secret Birthday Bash!', it was announced Attack! Pro Wrestling would be returning with Mark Andrews as a new owner and this show was actually the return event for the promotion. During the Attack! is Back two night event, Wild Boar defeated Nico Angelo to become the new Attack! Champion. As the year went on several storylines took place, including Nico losing a loser leaves Attack match against Kid Lykos and later Kid Lykos being betrayed by Wild Boar and Kid Lykos II (who formed an alliance) and later being joined by Attack! newcomers James Ellis & Mulligan, a losing stream for Elijah, a 1UP Extra life cash in for Nino Bryant, a feud between Splits McPins and his long life rival, Chips McSwings alongside Larry the Caddy, the return of Old Poppa Sunflower and a feud with Connor Mills around his new baby boy.

On Night 1 of the returning Under the Mistletour, Sonny the Sunflower (Old Poppa Sunflower's child) debuted & defeated Connor Mills and Eddie Dennis returned after a small hiatus from professional wrestling. At the end of Night 1, Nino Bryant cashed in his 1UP Life to bring back the banished Nico Angelo for an Attack! Championship match the next night. On Night 2, Chips McSwings defeated Splits McPins in a Snow Holds Barred match, Jay Joshua defeated James Ellis' undefeated streak since debuting in Attack! at the start of the year and Elijah ended his losing streak by winning a Present Under The Tree Christmas Rumble Match for a free cash in Championship match for up to a year. The main event between Wild Boar & Nico Angelo had Kid Lykos II turn on Boar, Ellis and Mulligan to reunite with Lykos Gym, only for Boar to defeat Nico for the Championship. Elijah then appeared with his Under The Tree present cash in and gave it to Nico for an immediate Championship rematch, which Nico defeated Wild Boar to become the Attack! Champion for the first time.

At the 'Hoodie Weather' event on 27 January 2024, the Attack! 24/7 Championship returned in a Scramble match which Splits McPins won. Immediately after this Championship win, Chip McSwings furthered his rivalry with Splits by attacking him and winning the 24:7 Championship due to the 24/7 rules of the Championship. At the next show (Press Start 7), Chips put the old 24:7 Championship belt a bin and unveiled a new 24:7 Championship design which the promotion has gone on to recognise as the new official Championship design.

During the lead up to Attack's 'Tag Team Extravaganza' event on 7 September 2024, it was announced the Attack! Tag Team Championship would be returning and would be held at the show in a one-night tournament. The Brothers of Construction (Jim & Lee Construction) returned and won the tournament defeating The Greedy Souls (Brendan White & Danny Jones) in the finals on this night.

Throughout 2024, the main storyline had Eddie Dennis turn his back on the Attack! Pack and form a new version of his previous 'Nothing To Prove' faction called 'Nothing 2 Prove'. At first he recruited Alex Vaughan and Curt Atlas from the Ring Crew Express, and later Harrison Bennett joined the group in a shock turn against Elijah (who he was forming a tag team with). At Goosebumps 9, Rayne Leverkusen also turned her back on everyone by joining the group. This seemed to resolve at Under The Mistletour Night 2 when Nino Bryant won the Attack! Championship from Eddie and he acknowledged his student for beating him and Nothing 2 Prove (at the time) went their separate ways.

=== 2025-Present ===
The stories in 2015 consisted of James Ellis winning the 1 Heart Up Scramble Match, which he cashed in at 'C'est La Vie' in May to win the ATTACK! Championship from then champion Nino Bryant after he retained against Danny Jones. Alongside this, the first Weird And Wonderful World Cup tournament was being held, where the winner would receive an ATTACK! Championship match later in the year. Kanji (representing England) ended up defeating Chip McSwings (representing the USA) in the finals, where she would face James Ellis for the ATTACK! Championship at Under The MistleTour Night 2. This match reignited their brief feud for the 24/7 Championship the previous year, where Hudson, who was integral to this feud, led to helping Kanji winning the ATTACK! Championship and become the first woman to accomplish this feat.

Old Poppa Sunflower also retired after making the promise to do so when him and his son, Sonny the Sunflower won the Tag Team Championships at the end of 2025. They lost the championship to Love At First Fight (Harrison Bennet & Rayne Leverkusen) at 'RaffleMania 6'. Nixon Newell made her surprise return to the promotion at Press Start 8 before having a brief feud with Dani Luna, who she turned on after their first match at 'C'est La Vie' in May. She would gain the assistance from a 'crazed fan' turned pro wrestler in AJ Nox

Towards the end of 2025, Josh Holly started a program with owner Mark Andrews about taking his to court over what he felt was unfair treatment to him during his time in ATTACK. This led to a final collision at their '15th Anniversary Show' in the promotion's debut at The Great Hall in Cardiff University's Student Union (their biggest capacity show yet), where Mark defeated Holly in a Courtroom Brawl Tables Match. Despite Holly getting help from new hired muscle Hunter Maul, Mark also had back up from the retired Eddie Dennis and Wild Boar to win the match. From here Josh would go into a spiral trying to get a big win, but this would not lead to much, even losing a match against WWE Legend Hornswoggle at 'Through Fire & Flames' for the 24/7 Championship, which Josh would win earlier that night in standard 24/7 shenanigans.

Another story leading heading into 2026 was James Ellis also going through a lose of direction at the start, but set his sights on wanting to become the first Attack talent to become the Triple Crown holder for the promotion. Despite not having the best of luck, he found an opportunity when newbie Aaron McRae won the 1 Heart Up Scramble Match at 'Press Start 9'. At 'Through Fire & Flame', Aaron McRae took advantage of the new ATTACK! Tag Team Champions Sinner & Saint (Judas Icarus & Travis Williams) being attacked by former champions The Greedy Souls just after winning the Championships in a Triple Threat Tag Team match, to challenge for and win the Tag Team Championship. Aaron chose James Ellis as his tag team partner and with this, Ellis became Attack! Pro Wrestling's first ever Triple Crown holder.

== Club One Hundred ==
In July 2016, Attack! Pro Wrestling launched "Club One Hundred", a series of events with a limited number of tickets available. The purpose of the events is to showcase up-and-coming British wrestlers, alongside some of the more established names.

== Working relationships ==
Prior to 2020, Attack! Pro Wrestling had run shows in conjunction with Fight Club:Pro, Chikara and Dragon Pro Wrestling.

As of 2023, Attack! Pro had run shows in conjunction with New Wave Wrestling (formerly Dragon Pro Wrestling) and Riot Cabaret Pro Wrestling.

Attack's On-Demand service, which includes many shows from Attack's archives, as well as past events from both Dragon Pro Wrestling and the promotion's rebranded alias, New Wave Wrestling.

In 2024, The owners of Attack! Pro Wrestling created a sibling promotion known as 'South Wales Pro Wrestling' mainly as a way for those being brought up through the New Wave Wrestling Cardiff Academy (which Mark Andrews is the main trainer in) to start being showcased more. Since being created, many Attack names have appeared, including different Championship matches being shown on occasion, and even being featured alongside Attack during the first night of their 2025 'Under The MistleTour'.

== Current championships ==
Championship	Current champion(s)	Reign	Location	Notes
Attack! Championship	Drew Parker	1	Cardiff, Wales	
Attack! Tag Team Championship	Pinnacle Of Brilliance (Aaron McRae & James Ellis)	1	Cardiff, Wales	
Attack! 24:7 Championship	Josh Holly	6	Bristol, England	

=== Attack! Championship ===
ATTACK! Championship

Details
- Promotion: ATTACK! Pro Wrestling
- Date established: 20 November 2016
- Current champion: Drew Parker
- Date won: 19 June 2026
Statistics
- First champion: Eddie Dennis
- Most reigns: Eddie Dennis (3 reigns)
- Longest reign: Cara Noir (402 days)
- Oldest champion: Eddie Dennis (38 years)
- Youngest champion: M. Shay Ultra (20 years)
- Heaviest champion: Eddie Dennis (218 lbs)
- Lightest champion: Flash Morgan Webster (156 lbs)

Key
No.	Overall reign number
Reign	Reign number for the specific champion
Days	Number of days held
<1	Reign lasted less than a day
+	Current reign is changing daily

No.	Champion	Championship change			Reign statistics		Notes	Ref.
No.	Champion	Date	Event	Location	Reign	Days	Notes	Ref.
1	Eddie Dennis	11 November 2016	ATTACK! Seriously? Another PPV Tie-In Event	Cardiff, Wales	1	97	Defeated Mike Bird to become the inaugural champion.	
2	Damian Dunne	25 February 2017	ATTACK! Gorilla Pressed And Deep In Conversation	Bristol, England	1	176		
3	Flash Morgan Webster	20 August 2017	ATTACK! (Thank God It's Not) WinterSlam 2	Cardiff, Wales	1	395	This was a title vs career match.	
4	Wild Boar	19 September 2018	ATTACK! Live At The Dome	London, England	1	60		
5	Eddie Dennis	18 November 2018	ATTACK! Memento Mori	Cardiff, Wales	2	27		
6	Damian Dunne	15 December 2018	ATTACK! Under The Mistletour 2018 - Day 3	Cardiff, Wales	2	211		
7	M. Shay Ultra	14 July 2019	ATTACK! RaffleMania 3	Bristol, England	1	161		
8	Cara Noir	21 December 2019	ATTACK! Under The Mistletour 2019 Day 3	Cardiff, Wales	1	402		
—	Vacated	26 January 2021	N/A	N/A	—	—	The Attack! Championship was vacated due to the promotion shutting down at the time.	
9	Wild Boar	2 April 2023	ATTACK! Is Back - Tag 2	Cardiff, Wales	2	258	The Championship was won after a 2 days tournament, where Boar defeated Nico Angelo to become the new Attack! Champion.	
10	Nico Angelo	16 December 2023	ATTACK! Under The Mistletour 2023 - Tag 2	Cardiff, Wales	1	113	While Nico originally lost to Boar, Elijah gave his Present Under The tree Title Opportunity to Nico after the match for an automatic Title match, which Nico won the Championship from Wild Boar.	
11	Jay Joshua	7 April 2024	ATTACK! Rafflemania - Tag 2	Cardiff, Wales	1	118	Matched ended via knockout.	
12	Eddie Dennis	3 August 2024	ATTACK! (Thank God It's Not) WinterSlam 6	Cardiff, Wales	3	134	In what was originally Jay Joshua VS Wild Boar, Eddie cashed in his 1 Up Heart Opportunity to be added to the match as the match took place, making it a triple threat match.	
13	Nino Bryant	15 December 2024	ATTACK! Under The Mistletour 2024 Night 2	Cardiff, Wales	1	154	This title match was Nino Bryant's Present Under The Tree Briefcase cash in from 'Under The Mistletour 2024 Night 1' the previous night.	
14	James Ellis	18 May 2025	ATTACK! C'est La Vie	Penarth, Wales	1	208	James Ellis cashed in his 1-Up Heart Match Opportunity for a shot at the Attack! Championship after the main event.	
15	Kanji	12 December 2025	ATTACK! Under The Mistletour 2025 Day 2	Cardiff, Wales	1	99	Kanji is the first female to win the ATTACK! Championship.	
16	Dani Luna	21 March 2026	ATTACK! 15 Year Anniversary	Cardiff, Wales	1	90		
17	Drew Parker	19 June 2026	ATTACK! Can You Feel My Heart	Cardiff, Wales	1	148+	Drew cashed in his Under The Mistletour briefcase for an ATTACK! Championship match straight after Dani retained her Championship against Rhio.	

==== Combined reigns ====
†	Indicates the current champion

Rank	Wrestler	No. of reigns	Combined days
1	Cara Noir	1	402
2	Flash Morgan Webster	1	395
3	Damian Dunne	2	387
4	Wild Boar	2	318
5	Eddie Dennis	3	258
6	James Ellis	1	208
7	M. Shay Ultra	1	161
8	Nino Bryant	1	154
9	Drew Parker †	1	148+
10	Jay Joshua	1	118
11	Nico Angelo	1	113
12	Kanji	1	99
13	Dani Luna	1	90

=== Attack! Tag Team Championship ===
ATTACK! Tag Team Championship

Details
- Promotion: ATTACK! Pro Wrestling
- Date established: 27 March 2015
- Current champions: Pinnacle Of Brilliance (Aaron McRae & James Ellis)
- Date won: 5 September 2026
Statistics
- First champions: Wonderland Of Wrestle (Elephant Mask and Super Santos Sr.)
- Most reigns: As tag team (4 reigns): CCK (Chris Brookes and Kid Lykos); The Hunter Brothers (Jim Hunter and Lee Hunter); As individual (5 reigns): Chris Brookes
- Longest reign: The 0121 (Dan Moloney and Man Like DeReiss) (2nd reign, 356 days)
- Shortest reign: CCK (Chris Brookes and Kid Lykos II) (<1 day); Moustache Mountain (Trent Seven and Tyler Bate) (<1 day); Sinner & Saint (Judas Icarus and Travis WIlliams)
- Oldest champion: Jim Hunter (42 years)
- Youngest champion: Kid Lykos II (17 years)
- Heaviest champion: Super Santos Sr. (216 lbs)
- Lightest champion: Nixon Newell (141 lbs)

Key
No.	Overall reign number
Reign	Reign number for the specific team—reign numbers for the individuals are in parentheses, if different
Days	Number of days held
<1	Reign lasted less than a day
+	Current reign is changing daily

No.	Champion	Championship change			Reign statistics		Notes	Ref.
No.	Champion	Date	Event	Location	Reign	Days	Notes	Ref.
1	Wonderland Of Wrestle (Elephant Mask and Super Santos Sr.)	27 March 2015	ATTACK! A Showcase Of Physical Theatre	Bristol, England	1	268	Defeated The Anti-Fun Police (Damian Dunne and Ryan Smile) in a tournament final to become the inaugural champions.	
2	The Hunter Brothers (Jim Hunter and Lee Hunter)	20 December 2015	ATTACK! Under The MistleTour - Day 2	Cardiff, Wales	1	28	This was a three-way elimination tables match also involving The Anti-Fun Police (Damian Dunne and Ryan Smile). In this match, Elephant Mask was replaced by Ramses. During this reign, The Hunter Brothers were known as 'The Brothers Of Construction', fighting under the names of Jim and Lee Construction.	
3	CCK (Chris Brookes and Kid Lykos)	17 January 2016	ATTACK! It Was Acceptable In The 80's	Cardiff, Wales	1	77	This was a three-way match also involving Wonderland Of Wrestle (Elephant Mask and Super Santos Sr.).	
4	Bayside High (Mark Andrews and Nixon Newell)	3 April 2016	ATTACK! How Do You Learn To Fall Off A 20ft Ladder?	Cardiff, Wales	1	140	This was a ladder match.	
5	CCK (Chris Brookes and Kid Lykos)	21 August 2016	ATTACK! (Thank God It's Not) WinterSlam	Cardiff, Wales	2	118	This was a Tables, ladders & chairs match.	
6	Bowl-A-Rama (Lloyd Katt and Split McPins)	17 December 2016	ATTACK! The MistleTour 2016 - Day 1	Cardiff, Wales	1	106		
7	CCK (Chris Brookes and Kid Lykos)	2 April 2017	ATTACK! My Sacrifice	Cardiff, Wales	3	105	This was a Best Two out of three falls match.	
8	Aussie Open (Kyle Fletcher and Mark Davis)	16 July 2017	ATTACK! The Neon Wristlock	Bristol, England	1	96		
9	The Hunter Brothers (Jim Hunter and Lee Hunter)	20 October 2017	ATTACK! Bodyslams And Control And Money And Power	Cheltenham, England	2	57	This was a three-way match also involving Bowl-A-Rama (Lloyd Katt and Splits McPins). During this reign, The Hunter Brothers were known as 'The Brothers Of Obstruction', fighting under the names of Jim and Leigh Obstruction.	
10	Bowl-A-Rama (Lloyd Katt and Split McPins)	16 December 2017	ATTACK! Under The MistleTour 2017 - Day 1	Cardiff, Wales	2	113		
11	Team White Wolf (A-Kid and Adam Chase)	8 April 2018	ATTACK! My Sacrifice II: EmbassyBingoMania	Cardiff, Wales	1	105		
12	Moustache Mountain (Trent Seven and Tyler Bate (2))	22 July 2018	ATTACK! Sunglasses After Dark	Cardiff, Wales	1	<1	Tyler Bate was previously known as Elephant Mask.	
13	CCK (Chris Brookes and Kid Lykos)	22 July 2018	ATTACK! Sunglasses After Dark	Cardiff, Wales	4	32		
—	Vacated	23 August 2018	—	—	—	—		
14	The Hunter Brothers (Jim Hunter and Lee Hunter)	25 August 2018	ATTACK! Kris Travis Tag Team Invitational 2018 - Day 2	Cardiff, Wales	3	85	Defeated Nothing To Prove (Chuck Mambo and Drew Parker) in the Kris Travis Tag Team Invitational 2018 Tournament final to win the vacant titles.	
15	Aussie Open (Kyle Fletcher and Mark Davis)	18 November 2018	ATTACK! Memento Mori	Cardiff, Wales	2	206	This was a Tables, ladders & chairs match also involving Nothing To Prove (Chuck Mambo and Drew Parker).	
16	The 0121 (Dan Moloney (2) and Man Like DeReiss)	12 June 2019	ATTACK! Live At The Dome IV	London, England	1	193	Dan Moloney was previously known as Super Santos Sr.	
17	Ring Crew Express (August Jackson and Sid Oakley)	22 December 2019	ATTACK! Under The Mistletour 2019 Day 4	Bristol, England	1	45		
18	CCK (Chris Brookes (5) and Kid Lykos II)	5 February 2020	ATTACK! Awadama Fever	London, England	1	<1		
19	The 0121 (Dan Moloney (3) and Man Like DeReiss)	5 February 2020	ATTACK! Awadama Fever	London, England	2	356		
—	Vacated	26 January 2021	N/A	N/A	—	—	Tag Team Championship was vacated due to the promotion shutting down at the time. On 12 August 2024, the titles were announced to return at 'Attack! Tag Team Extravaganza' on 7 September 2024 in a one-night tournament.	
20	The Hunter Brothers (Jim Hunter and Lee Hunter)	7 September 2024	ATTACK! Tag Team Extravaganza	Cardiff, Wales	4	99	New Champions were crowned in a one-night tournament where Jim and Lee defeated The Greedy Souls (Brendan White and Danny Jones) in the finals. During this reign, The Hunter Brothers were known as 'The Brothers Of Construction', fighting under the names of Jim and Lee Construction.	
21	Father & Sonflower (Old Poppa Sunflower & Sonny The Sunflower)	15 December 2024	ATTACK! Under The Mistletour 2024 Night 2	Cardiff, Wales	1	125		
22	Love At First Fight (Harrison Bennett & Rayne Leverkusen)	19 April 2025	ATTACK! RaffleMania 6	Cardiff, Wales	1	133	This was a Barnyard Brawl match.	
22	Legion Of Bloom (Lil' Johnny The Sunflower & Sonny The Sunflower (2))	30 August 2025	ATTACK! (Thank God It's Not) WinterSlam 7	Cardiff, Wales	1	104		
23	The Freshnas (Fabio & Martin Steers)	12 December 2025	ATTACK! Under The Mistletour 2025 Day 2	Cardiff, Wales	1	99		
24	Greedy Souls (Brendan White & Danny Jones)	21 March 2026	ATTACK! 15 Year Anniversary	Cardiff, Wales	1	168	This was a Tornado Four Way match also including The Legion of Bloom (Lil' Johnny The Sunflower & Sonny The Sunflower) and Sunshine Machine (Chuck Mambo & TK Cooper).	
25	Sinner & Saint (Judas Icarus & Travis Williams)	05 September 2026	ATTACK! 15 Year Anniversary	Cardiff, Wales	1	<1	This was a Triple Threat Tag Team match also including The VeloCities (Jude London & Paris De Silva).	
26	Pinnacle Of Brilliance (Aaron McRae & James Ellis)	05 September 2026	ATTACK! 15 Year Anniversary	Cardiff, Wales	1	70+	Aaron McRae cashed in his 1 Up Heart Opportunity to challenge for the Tag Team Championship after SInner & Saint were attacked by Greedy Souls post title loss. Aaron chose James as his partner. Upon this win, James Ellis became the first ATTACK! Triple Crown Champion, having previous won the ATTACK! and ATTACK! 24:7 Championships.	

==== Combined reigns ====
†	Indicates the current champion

Rank	Team	No. of reigns	Combined days
1	The 0121 (Dan Moloney and Man Like DeReiss)	2	549
2	CCK (Chris Brookes and Kid Lykos)	4	332
3	Aussie Open (Kyle Fletcher and Mark Davis)	2	302
4	The Hunter Brothers (Jim Hunter and Lee Hunter)	4	269
5	Wonderland Of Wrestle (Elephant Mask and Super Santos Sr.)	1	268
6	Bowl-A-Rama (Lloyd Katt and Split McPins)	2	219
7	Greedy Souls (Brendan White & Danny Jones)	1	168
8	Bayside High (Mark Andrews and Nixon Newell)	1	140
9	Love At First Fight (Harrison Bennett & Rayne Leverkusen)	1	133
10	Father & Sonflower (Old Poppa Sunflower & Sonny The Sunflower)	1	125
11	Team White Wolf (A-Kid and Adam Chase)	1	105
12	Legion Of Bloom (Lil' Johnny The Sunflower & Sonny The Sunflower)	1	104
13	The Freshnas (Fabio & Martin Steers)	1	99
14	Pinnacle Of Brilliance (Aaron McRae & James Ellis)	1	70+
15	Ring Crew Express (August Jackson and Sid Oakley)	1	45
16	CCK (Chris Brookes and Kid Lykos II)	1	<1
16	Moustache Mountain (Trent Seven and Tyler Bate)	1	<1
16	Sinner & Saint (Judas Icarus & Travis Williams)	1	<1

==== By wrestler ====
Rank	Wrestler	No. of reigns	Combined days
1	Dan Moloney/Super Santos Sr.	3	817
2	Man Like DeReiss	2	549
3	Chris Brookes	5	332
3	Kid Lykos	4	332
5	Kyle Fletcher	2	302
5	Mark Davis	2	302
7	Jim Hunter	4	269
7	Lee Hunter	4	269
9	Elephant Mask/Tyler Bate	2	268
10	Sonny The Sunflower	2	229
11	Lloyd Katt	2	219
11	Split McPins	2	219
13	Brendan White	1	168
13	Danny Jones	1	168
15	Mark Andrews	1	140
15	Nixon Newell	1	140
17	Harrison Bennett	1	133
17	Rayne Leverkusen	1	133
19	Old Poppa Sunflower	1	125
20	A-Kid	1	105
20	Adam Chase	1	105
22	Lil' Johnny The Sunflower	1	104
23	Fabio	1	99
23	Martin Steers	1	99
25	Aaron McRae †	1	70+
25	James Ellis †	1	70+
27	August Jackson	1	45
27	Sid Oakley	1	45
29	Kid Lykos II	1	<1
29	Trent Seven	1	<1

=== Attack! 24/7 Championship ===
ATTACK! 24/7 Championship

Details
- Promotion: ATTACK! Pro Wrestling
- Date established: 20 December 2013
- Current champion: Josh Holly
- Date won: 25 October 2026

Other names
- ATTACK! 24:7 Championship (2013–2021); ATTACK! 24/7 Championship (2024–present)
Statistics
- First champion: Sebastian Radclaw
- Most reigns: ELIJAH (8 reigns)
- Longest reign: Pete Dunne (574 days)
- Oldest champion: Joey Ryan (37 years, 173 days)
- Youngest champion: Everett (6 months)
- Heaviest champion: Dave Mastiff (315 lbs)
- Lightest champion: Everett (Actual weight unknown, but they were a newborn baby)

The Attack! 24/7 Championship is a championship owned by Attack! Pro Wrestling that works under the 24/7 rule, very similar to other hardcore championships, which means it can be defended anytime, anywhere. During its existence, the title has been won by wrestlers (regardless of gender), tag teams, referees and even fans and inanimate objects.

Key
No.	Overall reign number
Reign	Reign number for the specific champion
Days	Number of days held
<1	Reign lasted less than a day
+	Current reign is changing daily

No.	Champion	Championship change			Reign statistics		Notes	Ref.
No.	Champion	Date	Event	Location	Reign	Days	Notes	Ref.
1	Sebastian Radclaw	20 December 2013	Under The MistleTour Day 1	Bristol, England	1	<1	Defeated Damian Dunne in the Elder Stein Invitational tournament final in a Christmas Tree L-C match to become the inaugural champion.	
2	Ethan Silver	20 December 2013	Under The MistleTour Day 1	Bristol, England	1	1		
3	Robbie X	21 December 2013	Under The MistleTour Day 2	Cardiff, Wales	1	<1		
4	Wild Boar	21 December 2013	Under The MistleTour Day 2	Cardiff, Wales	1	<1		
5	Chris Brookes	21 December 2013	Under The MistleTour Day 2	Cardiff, Wales	1	<1		
6	Arthur Klauser-Saxon	21 December 2013	Under The MistleTour Day 2	Cardiff, Wales	1	<1		
7	Eddie Dennis	21 December 2013	Under The MistleTour Day 2	Cardiff, Wales	1	<1		
8	Sebastian Radclaw	21 December 2013	Under The MistleTour Day 2	Cardiff, Wales	2	<1		
9	Chris Roberts	21 December 2013	Under The MistleTour Day 2	Cardiff, Wales	1	<1	Chris Roberts was the first referee to have ever won the title	
10	Damian Dunne	21 December 2013	Under The MistleTour Day 2	Cardiff, Wales	1	<1		
11	Mark Andrews	21 December 2013	Under The MistleTour Day 2	Cardiff, Wales	1	1		
12	Nathan Daniels	22 December 2013	Under The MistleTour Day 3	Dudley, England	1	<1		
13	Jeff Cornell	22 December 2013	Under The MistleTour Day 3	Dudley, England	1	<1		
14	Pete Dunne	22 December 2013	Under The MistleTour Day 3	Dudley, England	1	<1		
15	Jim Lee	22 December 2013	Under The MistleTour Day 3	Dudley, England	1	<1		
16	Arthur Klauser-Saxon	22 December 2013	Under The MistleTour Day 3	Dudley, England	2	104		
17	Mark Andrews	5 April 2014	N/A	N/A	2	1		
18	Pete Dunne	6 April 2014	N/A	Venlo, Netherlands	2	6		
19	Mark Andrews	12 April 2014	Pro Wrestling Chaos 5 - Triple Threat	Bristol, England	3	1	This was a triple threat match also involving Eddie Dennis.	
20	Nixon Newell	13 April 2014	TCW Release The Kraken	Leeds, England	1	1	Nixon Newell was the first female wrestler to have ever won the title.	
21	Wild Boar	13 April 2014	TCW Release The Kraken	Leeds, England	2	8		
22	Farmer Giles	20 April 2014	N/A	N/A	1	<1		
23	Wild Boar	20 April 2014	N/A	N/A	3	12		
24	Damian Dunne	2 May 2014	N/A	Wolverhampton, England	2	17		
25	Trent Seven	19 May 2014	N/A	Rome, Italy	1	<1		
26	Dave Mastiff	19 May 2014	N/A	Rome, Italy	1	<1		
27	Flash Morgan Webster	19 May 2014	N/A	Rome, Italy	1	5		
28	Arthur Klauser-Saxon	24 May 2014	Press Start Level 2	Cardiff, Wales	3	<1		
29	Mark Andrews	24 May 2014	Press Start Level 2	Cardiff, Wales	4	<1		
30	T-Bone	24 May 2014	Press Start Level 2	Cardiff, Wales	1	<1		
31	Jim Hunter and Lee Hunter	24 May 2014	Press Start Level 2	Cardiff, Wales	1	55	This was a 2-on-1 handicap match in which both Jim and Lee simultaneously pinned T-Bone to become co-champions. They were the first ever tag team to have ever captured the title.	
32	Sam Bailey and Zack Gibson	18 July 2014	The Weird And Wonderful World Of ATTACK! Pro Wrestling	Bristol, England	1	<1		
33	Flips and Forearms (Mark Andrews (5) and Pete Dunne (3))	18 July 2014	The Weird And Wonderful World Of ATTACK! Pro Wrestling	Bristol, England	1	<1		
34	Lana Austin and Nixon Newell (2)	18 July 2014	The Weird And Wonderful World Of ATTACK! Pro Wrestling	Bristol, England	1	<1		
35	Mike Bird	18 July 2014	The Weird And Wonderful World Of ATTACK! Pro Wrestling	Bristol, England	1	<1		
36	Skat Monkey	18 July 2014	The Weird And Wonderful World Of ATTACK! Pro Wrestling	Bristol, England	1	102	Skat Monkey (a soft toy) was the first inanimate object to win the 24:7 Championship.	
37	Damian Dunne	28 October 2014	GooseBUMPS 2: Sebastian Radclaw's Halloween Extravaganza	Cardiff, Wales	3	<1		
38	Wild Boar	28 October 2014	GooseBUMPS 2: Sebastian Radclaw's Halloween Extravaganza	Cardiff, Wales	4	53		
39	Sebastian Radclaw	20 December 2014	Santa's Still Real To Us, Damn It!	Bristol, England	3	<1		
40	Damian Dunne	20 December 2014	Santa's Still Real To Us, Damn It!	Bristol, England	4	<1		
41	Eddie Dennis	20 December 2014	Santa's Still Real To Us, Damn It!	Bristol, England	2	56	This was a Lumber Elf match in which Eddie Dennis wrestled as Santa Claus, while Damian Dunne wrestled as Scrooge.	
42	Daft Bump	14 February 2015	Wrestling To Make Love To	Middlewich, England	1	<1		
43	Pete Dunne	14 February 2015	Wrestling To Make Love To	Middlewich, England	4	307		
44	Eddie Dennis	18 December 2015	Under The MistleTour Day 1	Bristol, England	3	2		
45	Wild Boar	20 December 2015	Under The MistleTour Day 3	Cardiff, Wales	5	28		
46	Eddie Dennis	17 January 2016	It Was Acceptable In The 80's	Cardiff, Wales	4	<1		
47	Pete Dunne	17 January 2016	It Was Acceptable In The 80's	Cardiff, Wales	5	77		
48	Shay Purser	3 April 2016	N/A	Cardiff, Wales	1	61		
49	Damian Dunne	3 June 2016	Press Start 4	Cardiff, Wales	5	<1		
50	Jim Hunter	3 June 2016	Press Start 4	Cardiff, Wales	2	79	This was a tag team match in which Mark Andrews, Nixon Newell and Jim Hunter defeated Damian Dunne, Mondai Lykos and Pete Dunne. Hunter pinned Damian to win the match and also the championship.	
51	Travis Banks	21 August 2016	(Thank God It's Not) WinterSlam	Cardiff, Wales	1	<1		
52	Ryan Smile	21 August 2016	(Thank God It's Not) WinterSlam	Cardiff, Wales	1	91	This was a tag team match in which Ryan Smile and Lee Construction defeated Damian Dunne and Travis Banks. Smile pinned Banks to win the match and also the championship.	
—	Vacated	20 November 2016	Seriously? Another PPV Tie-In Event	Cardiff, Wales	—	—	Ryan Smile vacated the title due to unknown reasons.	
53	Sean Kustom	20 November 2016	Seriously? Another PPV Tie-In Event	Cardiff, Wales	1	<1	Sean Kustom defeated Lee Construction to win the vacant title.	
54	Chuck Mambo	20 November 2016	Seriously? Another PPV Tie-In Event	Cardiff, Wales	1	<1		
55	Los Federales Santos Sr.	20 November 2016	Seriously? Another PPV Tie-In Event	Cardiff, Wales	1	<1		
56	Drew Parker	20 November 2016	Seriously? Another PPV Tie-In Event	Cardiff, Wales	1	28		
57	Danny Jones	20 November 2016	N/A	Bristol, England	2	<1	Previously went under the ring name 'Nathan Daniels'.	
58	Drew Parker	20 November 2016	The MistleTour 2016 Day 2	Bristol, England	2	20		
59	Clint Margera	7 January 2017	FCP/ATTACK! WrestleHouse	Wolverhampton, England	1	<1		
60	Shay Purser	7 January 2017	FCP/ATTACK! WrestleHouse	Wolverhampton, England	2	<1		
61	Joel Allen	7 January 2017	FCP/ATTACK! WrestleHouse	Wolverhampton, England	1	<1		
62	Warren Owen	7 January 2017	FCP/ATTACK! WrestleHouse	Wolverhampton, England	1	6		
63	Kid Lykos	13 January 2017	ATTACK! Club One Hundred #3	Cheltenham, England	2	<1	Previously performed under the ring name Ethan Silver.	
64	Warren Owen	13 January 2017	ATTACK! Club One Hundred #3	Cheltenham, England	2	43		
—	Vacated	25 February 2017	Gorilla Pressed And Deep In Conversation	Bristol, England	—	—	Shay Purser used an "executive order" to strip Owen of the title	
65	Warren Owen	25 February 2017	Gorilla Pressed And Deep In Conversation	Bristol, England	3	7	Owen defeated Shay Purser to win the vacant title.	
66	Everett	4 March 2017	Kris Travis Tag Team Invitational Day 1	Cardiff, Wales	1	<1		
—	Vacated	25 February 2017	Kris Travis Tag Team Invitational Day 1	Cardiff, Wales	—	—	Way vacated due to Everett being a 6 month year old baby who was unable to defend the championship. Warren won the Championship back off-screen.	
67	Warren Owen	4 March 2017	Kris Travis Tag Team Invitational Day 1	Cardiff, Wales	4	1		
68	Luke	5 March 2017	Kris Travis Tag Team Invitational Day 2	Cardiff, Wales	1	<1		
—	Vacated	5 March 2017	Kris Travis Tag Team Invitational Day 2	Cardiff, Wales	—	—	Championship reign was vacated due to 'Luke not being allowed on Vimeo' via Attack! management. Warren won the Championship back off-screen.	
69	Warren Owen	5 March 2017	Kris Travis Tag Team Invitational Day 2	Cardiff, Wales	5	28		
70	Shay Purser	2 April 2017	ATTACK! My Sacrifice	Cardiff, Wales	3	<1		
71	Nixon Newell	2 April 2017	ATTACK! My Sacrifice	Cardiff, Wales	3	27		
72	Dick Riley	29 April 2017	PWC Sweet Dreams	Bristol, England	1	<1		
73	Joey Ryan	29 April 2017	PWC Sweet Dreams	Bristol, England	1	6		
74	Lloyd Katt	5 May 2017	N/A	N/A	1	8		
75	Tyler Bate	13 May 2017	Teenagers With Attitude	Cheltenham, England	4	7	Previous went under the ring name 'Arthur Klauser-Saxon'.	
76	Pete Dunne	20 May 2017	N/A	Chicago, USA	6	574		
—	Vacated	15 December 2018	N/A	N/A	—	—		
77	Robbie X	4 January 2019	The New Year ATTACK! Pro-Wrestling 24/7 Title Tournament	Cheltenham, England	2	9	Robbie X defeated Connor Mills in the tournament final to win the vacant title.	
78	Kyle Fletcher	13 January 2019	Despair & Traffic	Cardiff, Wales	1	<1	This was a 2-on-1 handicap match where Fletcher pinned Robbie X to win the title.	
79	Mark Davis	13 January 2019	Despair & Traffic	Cardiff, Wales	1	<1		
80	Kyle Fletcher	13 January 2019	Despair & Traffic	Cardiff, Wales	2	<1		
81	Mark Davis	13 January 2019	Despair & Traffic	Cardiff, Wales	2	<1		
82	Kyle Fletcher	13 January 2019	Despair & Traffic	Cardiff, Wales	3	<1		
83	Aussie Open (Kyle Fletcher (4) and Mark Davis (3))	13 January 2019	Despair & Traffic	Cardiff, Wales	1	<1	This match ended in a double pin, therefore Fletcher and Davis were recognized as co-champions.	
84	Robbie X	13 January 2019	Despair & Traffic	Cardiff, Wales	3	28	This was a 2-on-1 handicap match in which Robbie X pinned Fletcher to win the championship.	
85	Mike Bailey	10 February 2019	Long Road, No Turns	Bristol, England	1	<1		
86	Robbie X	10 February 2019	Long Road, No Turns	Bristol, England	4	<1		
87	Mike Bailey	10 February 2019	Long Road, No Turns	Bristol, England	2	<1		
88	Cara Noir	10 February 2019	Long Road, No Turns	Bristol, England	1	56		
89	Musmortus	7 April 2019	ATTACK! My Sacrifice III	Cardiff, Wales	1	129	This was a three way match also involving Chief Deputy Dunne	
90	Cara Noir	14 August 2019	(Thank God It's Not) WinterSlam 4	London, England	2	<1		
91	Chuck Mambo	14 August 2019	(Thank God It's Not) WinterSlam 4	London, England	2	3		
92	Cara Noir	17 August 2019	ATTACK! Perfection Through Silence	Cardiff, Wales	3	<1		
93	Chuck Mambo	17 August 2019	ATTACK! Perfection Through Silence	Cardiff, Wales	3	<1		
94	Cara Noir	17 August 2019	ATTACK! Perfection Through Silence	Cardiff, Wales	4	<1		
95	Sid Oakley	17 August 2019	ATTACK! Perfection Through Silence	Cardiff, Wales	1	<1		
96	Chuck Mambo	17 August 2019	ATTACK! Perfection Through Silence	Cardiff, Wales	4	123		
97	Nico Angelo	18 December 2019	ATTACK! Under The Mistletour 2019 Day 1	London, England	1	405		
—	Vacated	26 January 2021	N/A	N/A	—	—	The 24/7 Championship was vacated due to the promotion shutting down at the time. It was later reactivated on 27 January 2024.	
98	Splits McPins	27 January 2024	Attack! Hoodie Weather	Cardiff, Wales	1	<1	The 24/7 Championship was reactivated with a new Championship design and slight name change from '24:7' to '24/7' and held in a Scramble match which also featured Danny Jones, ELIJAH, Jay Joshua, Kid Lykos and Kid Lykos II.	
99	Chip McSwings	27 January 2024	Attack! Hoodie Weather	Cardiff, Wales	1	35	At the 'Press Start 7' event, a new Championship design for the 24/7 Championship was revealed and replaced the previous design when that was pin in a rubbish bin.	
100	Leon Cage	2 March 2024	Attack! Press Start 7	Cardiff, Wales	1	<1	This was a tag team match in which Leon Cage and Splits McPins defeated Chip McSwings and Larry The Caddy. Leon pinned McSwings to win the match and also the championship.	
101	James Drake	2 March 2024	Attack! Press Start 7	Cardiff, Wales	1	<1		
102	Split McPins	2 March 2024	Attack! Press Start 7	Cardiff, Wales	2	34		
103	Larry The Caddy	5 April 2024	N/A	Cardiff, Wales	1	1	This title change was posted on Attack's Pro Wrestling's social media accounts on 5 April 2024 at the Hollywood Bowl Cardiff where Larry the Caddy won the 24/7 Championship and was officially recognised as the new Champion.	
104	Kanji	6 April 2024	Attack! RaffleMania V Night 1	Cardiff, Wales	1	<1	This was won held in a Scramble match which also featured Flash Morgan Webster, James Ellis and Josh Holly.	
105	James Ellis	6 April 2024	Attack! RaffleMania V Night 1	Cardiff, Wales	1	1		
106	Hudson	7 April 2024	Attack! RaffleMania V Night 2	Cardiff, Wales	1	34	The championship was initially offered as a prize during a raffle, but Ellis was unwilling to relinquish the championship. Ellis was attacked by Kanji and allowed the raffle winner Hudson to pin Ellis and was officially recognised as the new Champion.	
107	James Ellis	11 May 2024	Attack! Feeling This	Cardiff, Wales	2	<1	James Ellis pinned Kanji (who was representing Hudson) after a match with Josh Holly to become the new 24:7 Champion.	
108	Hudson	11 May 2024	Attack! Feeling This	Cardiff, Wales	2	35	After a tag team match between James Ellis & Mulligan VS Ring Crew Express (Alex Vaughan & Curt Atlas), Kanji (again representing Hudson) pinned James Ellis to win the Championship for Hudson.	
—	Vacated	15 June 2024	Attack! Bad Blood (Taylor's Version)	Cardiff, Wales	—	—	The 24/7 Championship was vacated due to Hudson being unable to defend the Championship after a 'car accident' (implied to have been caused by Chip McSwings).	
109	Chuck Mambo	3 August 2024	ATTACK! (Thank God It's Not) WinterSlam 6	Cardiff, Wales	5	<1	This was a ladder match against Chips McSwings.	
110	Josh Holly	3 August 2024	ATTACK! (Thank God It's Not) WinterSlam 6	Cardiff, Wales	1	35		
111	Rayne Leverkusen	7 September 2024	ATTACK! Tag Team Extravaganza	Cardiff, Wales	1	63		
—	Vacated	9 November 2024	Attack! Goosebumps 9	Cardiff, Wales	—	—	Rayne Leverkusen vacated the Championship at this show due not being cleared to compete by medic after suffering a recent injury.	
112	Nino Bryant	9 November 2024	ATTACK! Goosebumps 9	Cardiff, Wales	1	<1	This was won in a Scramble match against John Holly, Iva Kolasky and Shane Hooker.	
113	Josh Holly	9 November 2024	ATTACK! Goosebumps 9	Cardiff, Wales	2	<1		
114	Iva Kolasky	9 November 2024	ATTACK! Goosebumps 9	Cardiff, Wales	1	<1		
115	Shane Hooker	9 November 2024	ATTACK! Goosebumps 9	Cardiff, Wales	1	<1		
116	Josh Holly	9 November 2024	ATTACK! Goosebumps 9	Cardiff, Wales	3	<1		
117	Nino Bryant	9 November 2024	ATTACK! Goosebumps 9	Cardiff, Wales	2	<1		
118	Harrison Bennett	9 November 2024	ATTACK! Goosebumps 9	Cardiff, Wales	1	36		
119	ELIJAH	15 December 2024	ATTACK! Under The Mistletour 2024 Night 2	Cardiff, Wales	1	34		
120	Danny Jones	18 January 2025	ATTACK! Hoodie Weather 2	Cardiff, Wales	3	<1		
121	ELIJAH	18 January 2025	ATTACK! Hoodie Weather 2	Cardiff, Wales	2	43		
122	Tea Jane Watson	2 March 2025	ATTACK! Live At The Loco	Bristol, England	1	<1	This was a four way scramble match also involving Session Moth Martina and Visage.	
123	Session Moth Martina	2 March 2025	ATTACK! Live At The Loco	Bristol, England	1	<1		
124	Visage	2 March 2025	ATTACK! Live At The Loco	Bristol, England	1	<1	Visage was the first non-binary wrestler to have won the title while identifying as non-binary at that moment. Mike Bailey came out as non-binary years after his/their 24:7 title victories.	
125	ELIJAH	2 March 2025	ATTACK! Live At The Loco	Bristol, England	3	48		
126	Tommy Vrill	19 April 2025	ATTACK! RaffleMania 6	Cardiff, Wales	1	<1	This was a triple threat match also involving James Ellis.	
127	Chip McSwings	19 April 2025	ATTACK! RaffleMania 6	Cardiff, Wales	2	<1	Tommy Vrill handed over the 24:7 Championship to his mentor Chip McSwings as 'a gift of friendship'.	
128	ELIJAH	19 April 2025	ATTACK! RaffleMania 6	Cardiff, Wales	4	43		
129	Tommy Vrill	1 June 2025	ATTACK! Live At The Loco 2: Electric Boogaloo	Bristol, England	2	<1		
130	ELIJAH	1 June 2025	ATTACK! Live At The Loco 2: Electric Boogaloo	Bristol, England	5	<1		
131	Larry The Caddy	1 June 2025	ATTACK! Live At The Loco 2: Electric Boogaloo	Bristol, England	2	<1		
132	Adam Crater	1 June 2025	ATTACK! Live At The Loco 2: Electric Boogaloo	Bristol, England	1	<1		
133	ELIJAH	1 June 2025	ATTACK! Live At The Loco 2: Electric Boogaloo	Bristol, England	6	42		
134	Paul London	13 July 2025	ATTACK! Rain In July	Cardiff, Wales	1	<1		
135	Tommy Vrill	13 July 2025	ATTACK! Rain In July	Cardiff, Wales	3	<1		
136	ELIJAH	13 July 2025	ATTACK! Rain In July	Cardiff, Wales	7	11		
137	Larry The Caddy	24 July 2025	SWPW	Cardiff, Wales	3	<1	This (plus other titles changes on this night/event) happened at a 'South Wales Pro Wrestling' event, which is the sibling promotion of Attack! Pro Wrestling.	
138	ELIJAH	24 July 2025	SWPW	Cardiff, Wales	8	37		
139	Nino Bryant	30 August 2025	ATTACK! (Thank God It's Not) WinterSlam 7	Cardiff, Wales	3	11	This was won in a 2 Falls Fatal 4 Way Match also for the ATTACK! Championship match including ATTACK! Champion James Ellis and Danny Jones. Nino Bryant pinned ELIJAH in the first fall for the 24:7 Championship.	
140	Zander Bryant	10 September 2025	N/A	N/A	1	8	This title was video posted on Attack’s Facebook, Instagram and Twitter/X accounts that showcased Zander pinning Nino at their residence to become the new 24:7 Champion, which was posted & officially recognized on 10 September 2025.	
141	Leland Bryant	18 September 2025	N/A	N/A	1	1	This title was video posted on Attack’s Instagram and Twitter/X accounts that showcased Leland pinning Zander at their residence. This was posted & officially recognized on 18 September 2025.	
142	Zander Bryant	19 September 2025	N/A	Borehamwood, England	2	8	This title was video posted on Attack’s Facebook, Instagram and Twitter/X accounts that showcased Leland pinning Zander outside a Tescos Supermarket in Borehamwood, England. This was posted & officially recognized on 19 September 2025.	
143	Nino Bryant	27 September 2025	ATTACK! At The Movies	Cardiff, Wales	4	112	This was a Triple Threat Match also including Leland Bryant.	
144	Cecil Nyx	17 January 2026	ATTACK! Hoodie Weather 3	Cardiff, Wales	1	1		
145	James Ellis	18 January 2026	Mystery Wrestling #21	Cardiff, Wales	3	<1		
146	Martin Steers	18 January 2026	Mystery Wrestling #21	Cardiff, Wales	1	20		
147	Jay Stynes	7 February 2026	RCW Live At The Pav	Cork, Ireland	1	8	RCW is the 'Rebel County Wrestling' promotion in Ireland.	
148	Love Making Demon	15 February 2026	ATTACK! Live At The Loco 5	Bristol, England	1	<1	This took place in a scramble match also including Oliver Sudden, Ryan J Williams and Tilly Rose. This version of Love Making Demon was portrayed by Tommy Vrill, but the character themselves is recognised as their own character within Attack! Pro Wrestling lore, so it will count as the character's first reign, but an additional total reign for Tommy Vrill in the Combined Reigns section.	
149	Matthew McGann	15 February 2026	ATTACK! Live At The Loco 5	Bristol, England	1	<1	Matthew McGann also portrays Splits McPins, but this reign will count as a separate reign outside of his Splits character since the two aren't connected in wrestling lore.	
150	James Ellis	15 February 2026	ATTACK! Live At The Loco 5	Bristol, England	4	34		
151	Sean Smith	21 March 2026	ATTACK! 15 Year Anniversary	Cardiff, Wales	1	64		
152	Derek DiScanio	24 May 2026	Slam Dunk Festival 2026	Leeds, England	1	<1	On a video release on Attack's social media on 27th May 2026, Derek DiScanio pinned Sean to win the 24:7 Championship. This was part of the Slam Dunk Festival 2026, but on one social media post it mentioned this was location specifically on their second day in Leeds, England.	
153	Sean Smith	24 May 2026	Slam Dunk Festival 2026	Leeds, England	2	19	On a video release on Attack's social media on 3rd June 2026, it was revealed Sean pinned Derek while he was asleep on the same day Derek won the Championship, during the Slam Dunk Festival 2026.	
154	Dan Marsala	12 June 2026	Download Festival 2026	Leicestershire, England	1	<1	While not officially specified which of the four days this took place in, this likely happened on the day Story of the Year were set to play at the festival, which was 12th June 2026.	
155	Sean Smith	12 June 2026	Download Festival 2026	Leicestershire, England	3	7		
156	Love Making Demon	19 June 2026	ATTACK! Can You Feel My Heart	Cardiff, Wales	2	69		
157	Create A Wrestler Green	27 August 2026	N/A	N/A	1	2	This title change was announced on Attack's social media accounts as taking place at an 'unknown location' while showing the title change through a professional wrestling video game. This version of Create A Wrestler (Green) was portrayed by James Ellis, but the character themself is recognised as their own character within Attack! Pro Wrestling lore being portrayed by different wrestlers, so it will count as the character's first reign, but an additional total reign for James Ellis in the Combined Reigns section.	
158	Create A Wrestler Red	29 August 2026	Mystery Wrestling #28	London, England	1	<1	While not officially confirmed, it is officially suspected Create A Wrestler Red is portrayed by Leon Cage. However the character themself is recognised as their own character within Attack! Pro Wrestling lore being portrayed by different wrestlers, so it will count as the character's first reign, but an additional total reign for Leon Cage in the Combined Reigns section.	
159	Man Like DeReiss	29 August 2026	Mystery Wrestling #28	London, England	1	<1		
160	Ravie Davie	29 August 2026	Mystery Wrestling #28	London, England	1	<1		
161	Cecil Nyx	29 August 2026	Mystery Wrestling #28	London, England	2	<1		
162	Big Strong Man	29 August 2026	Mystery Wrestling #28	London, England	1	<1		
163	Man Like DeReiss	29 August 2026	Mystery Wrestling #28	London, England	2	<1		
164	Melissa Fierce	29 August 2026	Mystery Wrestling #28	London, England	1	<1		
165	Cecil Nyx	29 August 2026	Mystery Wrestling #28	London, England	3	<1		
166	ATTACK! 24/7 Championship	29 August 2026	Mystery Wrestling #28	London, England	1	<1	Nyx fell with the belt on top of him, and the pin was counted.	
167	Top Dog	29 August 2026	Mystery Wrestling #28	London, England	1	<1		
168	Cecil Nyx	29 August 2026	Mystery Wrestling #28	London, England	4	<1		
169	Ron Funches	29 August 2026	Mystery Wrestling #28	London, England	1	<1		
170	Aubrey Edwards	29 August 2026	Mystery Wrestling #28	London, England	1	<1		
—	Vacated	29 August 2026	Mystery Wrestling #28	London, England	—	—	Referee Aubrey Edwards vacated the title as she was not a wrestler.	
171	Vacant	29 August 2026	Mystery Wrestling #28	London, England	2	<1	Create A Wrestler Red picked up the vacant belt, holding a sign identifying them as 'Vacant'.	
172	Cecil Nyx	29 August 2026	Mystery Wrestling #28	London, England	5	<1		
173	Create A Wrestler Green	29 August 2026	Mystery Wrestling #28	London, England	2	7		
174	Larry The Caddy	5 September 2025	ATTACK! Through Fire & Flames	Cardiff, Wales	4	<1		
175	Josh Holly	5 September 2025	ATTACK! Through Fire & Flames	Cardiff, Wales	4	<1		
176	Hornswoggle	5 September 2025	ATTACK! Through Fire & Flames	Cardiff, Wales	1	<1		
177	Larry The Caddy	5 September 2025	ATTACK! Through Fire & Flames	Cardiff, Wales	5	49		
178	Kid Lykos II	5 September 2025	ATTACK! Goosebumps 11 - Night 1	Cardiff, Wales	1	<1		
179	Josh Holly	24 October 2025	ATTACK! Goosebumps 11 - Night 1	Cardiff, Wales	5	1		
180	Orsi	25 October 2025	ATTACK! Goosebumps 11 - Night 2	Bristol, England	1	<1		
181	Josh Holly	25 October 2025	ATTACK! Goosebumps 11 - Night 2	Bristol, England	6	20+		

==== Combined reigns ====
†	Indicates the current champion

Rank	Wrestler	No. of reigns	Combined days
1	Pete Dunne	6	964
2	Nico Angelo	1	405
3	ELIJAH	8	258
4	Jim Hunter	2	134
5	Musmortus	1	129
6	Chuck Mambo	5	126
7	Nino Bryant	4	123
8	Arthur Klauser-Saxon/Tyler Bate	4	111
9	Skat Monkey	1	102
10	Wild Boar	5	101
11	Ryan Smile	1	91
12	Sean Smith	3	90
13	Warren Owen	5	85
14	Hudson	2	69
14	Love Making Demon/Tommy Vrill	5	69
16	Rayne Leverkusen	1	63
17	Shay Purser	3	61
18	Josh Holly †	6	56+
19	Cara Noir	4	56
19	Eddie Dennis	4	56
21	Lee Hunter	1	55
22	Larry the Caddy	5	50
23	Drew Parker	2	48
24	Create A Wrestler Green/James Ellis	6	44
25	Robbie X	4	37
26	Harrison Bennett	1	36
27	Chip McSwings	2	35
28	Matthew McGann/Splits McPins	3	34
29	Nixon Newell	3	28
30	Martin Steers	1	20
31	Damian Dunne	5	17
32	Zander Bryant	2	16
33	Jay Stynes	1	8
33	Lloyd Katt	1	8
35	Joey Ryan	1	6
36	Flash Morgan Webster	1	5
37	Mark Andrews	5	2
38	Cecil Nyx	5	1
39	Ethan Silver/Kid Lykos	2	1
40	Leland Bryant	1	1
41	Kyle Fletcher	4	<1
42	Create A Wrestler Red/Leon Cage/Vacant	3	<1
42	Danny Jones/Nathan Daniels	3	<1
42	Mark Davis	3	<1
42	Sebastian Radclaw	3	<1
46	Man Like DeReiss	2	<1
46	Mike Bailey	2	<1
48	Adam Crater	1	<1
48	ATTACK! 24/7 Championship	1	<1
48	Aubrey Edwards	1	<1
48	Big Strong Man	1	<1
48	Chris Roberts	1	<1
48	Clint Margera	1	<1
48	Dan Marsala	1	<1
48	Daft Bump	1	<1
48	Dave Mastiff	1	<1
48	Derek DiScanio	1	<1
48	Dick Riley	1	<1
48	Everett	1	<1
48	Farmer Giles	1	<1
48	Hornswoggle	1	<1
48	Iva Kolasky	1	<1
48	James Drake	1	<1
48	Jeff Cornell	1	<1
48	Jim Lee	1	<1
48	Joel Allen	1	<1
48	Kanji	1	<1
48	Kid Lykos II	1	<1
48	Lana Austin	1	<1
48	Los Federales Santos Sr.	1	<1
48	Luke	1	<1
48	Melissa Fierce	1	<1
48	Mike Bird	1	<1
48	Orsi	1	<1
48	Paul London	1	<1
48	Ravie Davie	1	<1
48	Ron Funches	1	<1
48	Sam Bailey	1	<1
48	Sean Kustom	1	<1
48	Session Moth Martina	1	<1
48	Shane Hooker	1	<1
48	Sid Oakley	1	<1
48	Tea Jane Watson	1	<1
48	Top Dog	1	<1
48	Travis Banks	1	<1
48	T-Bone	1	<1
48	Visage	1	<1

== Attack! Pro Wrestling Triple Crown Champions ==
ATTACK! Pro Wrestling acknowledged how those on their roster can be awarded the Triple Crown status in 2026. As of 5th September 2026, the date they crowned their first Triple Crown Champion, one must have held the ATTACK! Championship, the ATTACK! 24:7 Championship and the ATTACK! Tag Team Championship. Below are all those who have won this honour.

Key
Dates in **bold**	The date the wrestler achieved the Triple Crown

Champion	Primary championship	Secondary championship	Tag team championship
Champion	ATTACK! Championship	ATTACK! 24/7 Championship	ATTACK! Tag Team Championship
James Ellis	18 May 2025	6 April 2024	**5 September 2026** (with Aaron McRae)

The following candidates are one Championship away from also joining the Triple Crown winners.

Champion	Primary championship	Secondary championship	Tag team championship
Champion	Attack Championship	Attack 24/7 Championship	Attack Tag Team Championship
Cara Noir	21 December 2019	10 February 2019	N/A
Chris Brookes	N/A	21 December 2013	17 January 2016 (with Kid Lykos)
Damien Dunne	25 February 2017	21 December 2013	N/A
Dan Moloney	N/A	20 November 2016 (as Los Federales Santos Sr.)	27 March 2015 (as Super Santos Sr.; with Elephant Mask)
Danny Jones	N/A	22 December 2013 (as Nathan Daniels)	21 March 2026 (with Brendan White)
Drew Parker	19 June 2026	20 November 2016	N/A
Eddie Dennis	20 November 2016	21 December 2013	N/A
Flash Morgan Webster	20 August 2017	19 May 2014	N/A
Harrison Bennett	N/A	9 November 2024	19 April 2025 (with Rayne Leverkusen)
Jim Hunter	N/A	24 May 2014 (with Lee Hunter)	20 December 2015 (as Jim Construction; with Lee Construction)
Josh Holly	N/A	3 August 2024	15 December 2024 (as Old Poppa Sunflower; with Sonny The Sunflower)
Kanji	12 December 2025	6 April 2024	N/A
Kid Lykos	N/A	21 December 2013 (as Ethan Silver)	17 January 2016 (with Chris Brookes)
Kid Lykos II	N/A	24 October 2026	5 February 2020 (with Chris Brookes)
Kyle Fletcher	N/A	13 January 2019	16 July 2017 (with Mark Davis)
Lee Hunter	N/A	24 May 2014 (with Jim Hunter)	20 December 2015 (as Lee Construction; with Jim Construction)
Lloyd Katt	N/A	5 May 2017	17 December 2016 (with Splits McPins)
Man Like DeReiss	N/A	29 August 2026	12 June 2019 (with Dan Moloney)
Mark Andrews	N/A	21 December 2013	3 April 2016 (with Nixon Newell)
Mark Davis	N/A	13 January 2019	16 July 2017 (with Kyle Fletcher)
Martin Steers	N/A	18 January 2026	12 December 2025 (with Fabio)
Nico Angelo	16 December 2023	18 December 2019	N/A
Nino Bryant	15 December 2024	9 November 2024	N/A
Nixon Newell	N/A	13 April 2014	3 April 2016 (with Mark Andrews)
Rayne Leverkusen	N/A	7 September 2024	19 April 2025 (with Harrison Bennett)
Shay Purser	14 July 2019 as M.Shay Ultra)	3 April 2016	N/A
Sid Oakley	N/A	17 August 2019	19 November 2019 (with August Jackson)
Splits McPins	N/A	27 January 2024	17 December 2016 (with Lloyd Katt)
Trent Seven	N/A	19 May 2014	22 July 2018 (with Tyler Bate)
Tyler Bate	N/A	21 December 2013 as Arthur Klauser-Saxon)	27 March 2015 (as Elephant Mask; with Super Santos Sr.)
Wild Boar	19 September 2018	21 December 2013	N/A

== Weird & Wonderful World Cup Tournament ==
- 2026 winner: Leon Cage [Wales]
- 2025 winner: Kanji [England]

== Embassy Bingo Cathays Invitational Classic Tournament ==
- 2020 winner: Connor Mills

== Kris Travis Tag Team Invitational Tournament ==
- 2018 winners: The Hunter Brothers (Jim Hunter & Lee Hunter)
- 2017 winners: Project Lucha (El Ligero & Martin Kirby)

== Elder Stein Invitational Tournament ==
- 2015 winner: Wild Boar
- 2013 winner: Sebastian Radclaw
- 2012 winner: Pete Dunne
- 2011 winner: Mark Andrews
