= Leon Cage =

Welsh professional wrestler

Personal information
- Born: 28 January 2007 (age 19) Neath Port Talbot, Wales

Professional wrestling career
- Ring name(s): Leon Cage; Mason Steel
- Billed from: Neath Port Talbot, Wales
- Debut: 2021

Leon Cage (born 28 January 2007) is a Welsh professional wrestler. He currently performs on the British independent wrestling scene, particularly with Revolution Pro Wrestling (RevPro) and Attack! Pro Wrestling, and has also competed internationally for Consejo Mundial de Lucha Libre (CMLL). He previously wrestled under the ring name Mason Steel.

== Professional wrestling career ==
=== Early career ===
Cage began his professional wrestling career in 2021, competing on the British independent wrestling circuit aged only 14. He competed for Revolution Pro Wrestling and Attack! Pro Wrestling, where he became known by the nickname "The Futurist".

=== Revolution Pro Wrestling ===
On 17 May 2026, Cage faced Callum Newman in singles competition at RevPro's Revolution Rumble event. Newman, the reigning IWGP World Heavyweight Champion, defeated Cage.

Cage subsequently continued to compete for RevPro, including an appearance at RevPro Live in London 109 on 5 July 2026 in a losing effort to AEW wrestler Bandido.

=== Attack! Pro Wrestling ===
In March 2024, Leon Cage won the Attack! 24/7 Championship at the promotion's Press Start 7 event, winning from Chips McSwings while dressed as a Pikachu due to the event's Video Game theme. He immediately lost it to James Drake, who was dressed as a Team Rocket Grunt, under the championship's 24/7 stipulation.

In March 2026, Cage competed at the promotion's 15th anniversary event, winning the Weird & Wonderful Rumble.

On 19 June 2026, Cage faced Pete Dunne at Attack! Pro Wrestling's Can You Feel My Heart in Cardiff, Wales. Dunne would defeat Cage. The match was notable for pairing the young Cage with Dunne, a contracted WWE wrestler and a former WWE NXT United Kingdom Champion

=== Consejo Mundial de Lucha Libre ===
In 2026, Cage began competing internationally for Mexican promotion Consejo Mundial de Lucha Libre (CMLL) as he was announcedto be part of Team World for the 2026 CMLL International Gran Prix.

Cage competed at CMLL Sábado de Coliseo on 1 August, teaming with Black Tiger and Flip Gordon against Xelhua and Hermanos Calavera. Cage's team won the match. On 4 August 2026 Cage defeated Max Star in a ten-minute Lightning Match at Arena México during CMLL's Semana Internacional. .

Cage's CMLL run most significant milestone came on 7 August 2026, when he competed in the CMLL International Gran Prix. Cage represented Team World alongside PAC, Claudio Castagnoli, Orange Cassidy, Bandido, Roderick Strong, DOUKI, Yujiro Takahashi, Austin Aries, Blake Christian and Rohan Raja in a losing effort against Team Mexico. Team Mexico, consisting of Xelhua, Volador Jr., Titán, Último Guerrero, Máscara Dorada, Hechicero, Templario, Ángel de Oro, Bárbaro Cavernario, Soberano Jr. and Místico.

The match also saw Cage make history as the youngest wrestler to receive a five-star rating from wrestling journalist Dave Meltzer. The achievement broke the previous record held by A-Kid, making Cage the youngest wrestler ever to receive a five-star match rating from Meltzer.

== In wrestling ==
- Finishing moves
  - Phoenix Splash
- Signature moves
  - Into The Future
- Nicknames
  - "The Futurist"

== Championships and accomplishments ==
- Attack! Pro Wrestling
  - Attack! 24:7 Championship (3 time)
  - Weird & Wonderful Rumble (2026)
  - Weird And Wonderful World Cup (2026)
- New Wave Wrestling
  - New Wave Wrestling Championship (1 time)
- No Mercy Wrestling
  - Iron Cobra Tournament winner (2023)
- Pro-Wrestling Chaos
  - Knights of Chaos Championship (1 time) – with Shane Hook
- Pro Wrestling Karnage
  - Karnage Outbreak Championship (1 time)
- Royal Imperial Wrestling
  - RIW Heritage Championship (1 time)
