= Lizzy Rain =

English professional wrestler (born 1998)

Personal information
- Born: Rayne Leat; 12 January 1998 (age 28) London, England
- Family: Clive Burr (uncle)

Professional wrestling career
- Ring name: Lizzy Rain Rayne Leverkusen
- Trained by: Sid Scala
- Debut: 2021

Rayne Leat (born 12 January 1998) is an English professional wrestler. She is signed to WWE, where she performs on the NXT brand under the ring name Lizzy Rain. She is also known for her time on the British independent circuit, where she performed under the ring name Rayne Leverkusen.

== Early life ==
Rayne Leat was born in London, England.

== Professional wrestling career ==
=== Independent circuit (2021–2026) ===
Leat began her professional wrestling career in 2021 under the ring name Rayne Leverkusen. She competed across the European independent wrestling scene, including appearances for PROGRESS Wrestling, Pro-Wrestling: EVE and Revolution Pro Wrestling and Pro Wrestling Chaos. She also competed internationally, including appearances in Japan for Sendai Girls' Pro Wrestling.

==== PROGRESS Wrestling ====
Leverkusen defeated Rhio to win the PROGRESS Women's Championship at Progress Chapter 185: Jump In The Line on 26 October 2025. She successfully defended the title at Progress Chapter 186: Noisy Neighbours against Session Moth Martina on 16 November 2025. She retained the title at Progress Chapter 187: Vendetta 3 against Emersyn Jayne on 30 November 2025. She retained the title again at Progress Chapter 188: Unboxing VIII: The Search For Socks against Kanji on 28 December 2025. She lost the PROGRESS Women's Championship at Progress Chapter 189: In Darkest Night to Alexxis Falcon on 25 January 2026.

=== WWE (2026–present) ===
In 2025, Leat took part in a WWE tryout during the SummerSlam weekend and was named the MVP of the class. In early 2026, she signed with WWE and reported to the WWE Performance Center, where was given the ring name of Lizzy Rain. Rain made her first appearance on WWE programming at NXT Vengeance Day on 7 March, where she was positioned at ringside during an NXT Underground match between Lola Vice and Kelani Jordan. At Week 1 of NXT: Revenge on 14 April, Rain wrestled her first match in a dark match against Layla Diggs. She made her on-screen in-ring debut on the 28 April episode of NXT where she defeated Nikkita Lyons.

== Professional wrestling persona ==
Leat wrestles with a metalhead gimmick under the moniker "The Maiden of Metal", in reference to her uncle Clive Burr and Iron Maiden. Leat revealed that the jacket she wears to the ring belonged to Burr. Her finishing move, Thunderstruck, is a step-up knee strike to the head inspired by Meiko Satomura and a reference to the song of the same name by AC/DC.

== Personal life ==
Leat comes from a musical background and is the niece of former Iron Maiden drummer Clive Burr (1956–2013). According to Leat, she was not close with Burr as he was battling multiple sclerosis by the time she got to know him.

== Championships and accomplishments ==
- Attack! Pro Wrestling
  - Attack! 24/7 Championship (1 time)
  - Attack! Tag Team Championship (1 time) – with Harrison Bennett
- Hustle Wrestling
  - Hustle Championship (2 times)
- New Wave Wrestling
  - New Wave Wrestling Women's Championship (1 time)
- No Mercy Wrestling
  - No Mercy Tag Team Championship (1 time) – with Harrison Bennett
- Pro Wrestling Chaos
  - Maiden of Chaos Championship (3 times)
- Pro-Wrestling: EVE
  - Pro-Wrestling: EVE Tag Team Championship (1 time) – with Laura Di Matteo
- PROGRESS Wrestling
  - PROGRESS Women's Championship (1 time)
