= Eddie Dennis =

Welsh professional wrestler (born 1986)

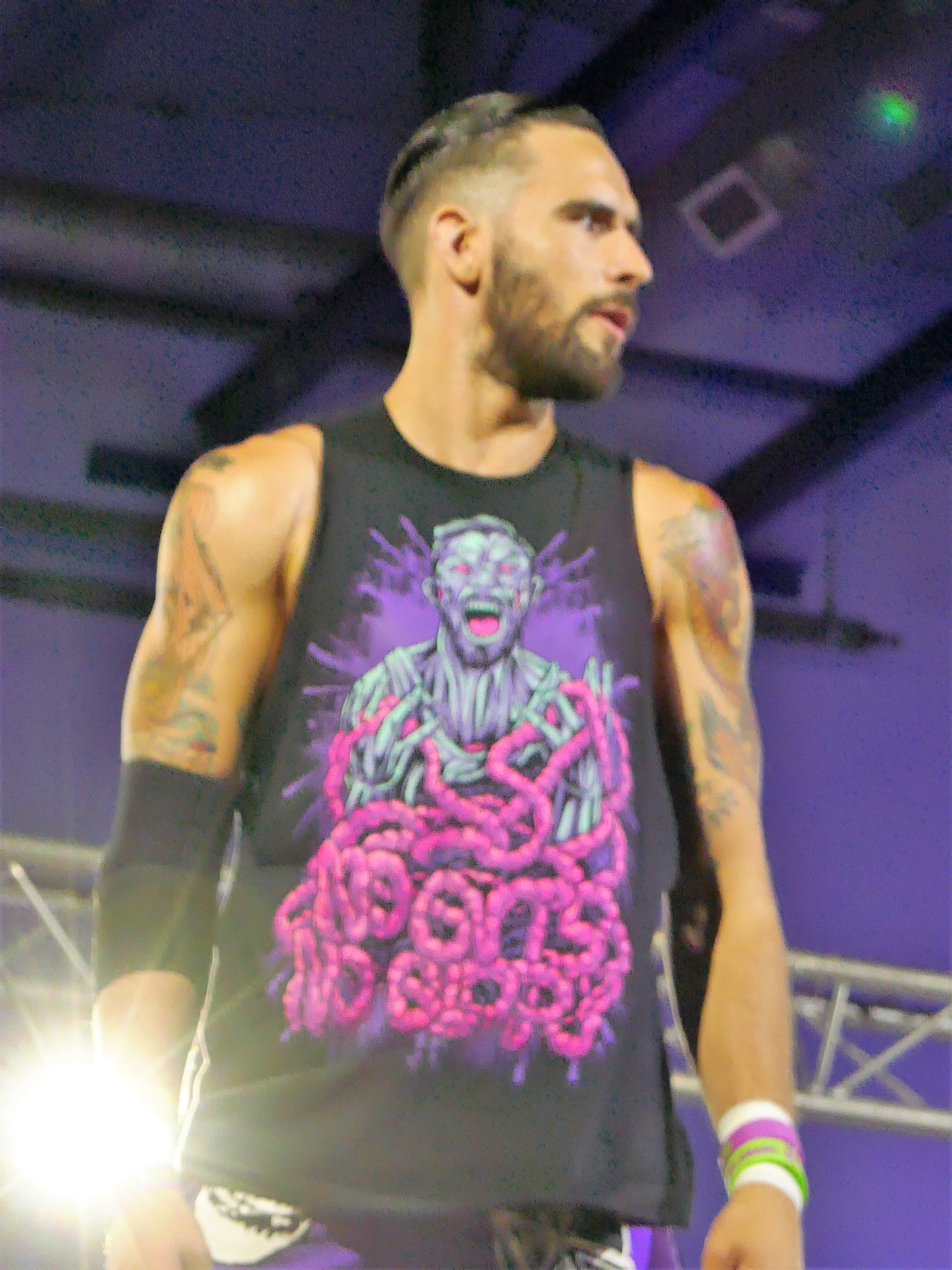
- Dennis in 2018

Personal information
- Born: Edward Dennis; 22 March 1986 (age 40) Swansea, Wales

Professional wrestling career
- Ring name: Eddie Dennis
- Billed height: 6 ft 6 in (198 cm)
- Billed weight: 230 lb (104 kg)
- Billed from: Swansea, Wales
- Trained by: Tyson Dux; Scott D'Amore; Carl Griffths
- Debut: 2008

Edward Dennis (born 22 March 1986) is a Welsh retired professional wrestler and former head teacher. He is best known for his tenure in WWE's NXT UK brand and on the independent circuit under his real name, stylized as Eddie Dennis.

== Professional wrestling career ==
Dennis began his wrestling career in 2008, whilst working full-time as a mathematics teacher in Cardiff, and later at LVS Ascot in Berkshire, where he became head teacher. In 2016, he left his job to become a full-time wrestler. Despite an unsuccessful first try-out with the WWE in 2017, he later would wrestle on the first NXT UK show at the Plymouth Pavilions.

=== Attack! Pro Wrestling (2011, 2013–2019) ===
Dennis's debut match was a live Attack! event held on 12 August 2011, where he defeated by fellow Welshman Wild Boar. Along with Wild Boar, Dennis shared the Attack! ring with Mark Andrews, Pete Dunne and Flash Morgan Webster, who would all join NXT UK. On 21 December 2013, Dennis won his first title, winning the Attack! 24:7 Championship. After losing the title within minutes, he has held the Attack! 24:7 Championship on a further three occasions. On 20 November 2016, Dennis defeated Mike Bird to become the inaugural Attack! Champion, holding the championship until 25 February 2017, where he lost it to Damian Dunne. On 18 November, Dennis became the first wrestler to hold the Attack! Championship on two occasions by defeating Wild Boar on 19 September 2018. On 15 December, Dennis would once again lose the Championship to Damian Dunne.

=== RevPro Wrestling (2014–2018, 2022 - 2023) ===
Eddie Dennis made his RevPro debut in 2014, on 10 May, where he teamed with Mark Andrews and Pete Dunne against Josh Bodom, Sha Samuels and Terry Frazier in a 6-person tag match. On 30 August 2015, Dennis was defeated by James Castle. On 1 May 2016, Dennis lost against Sha Samuels On 6 November 2016, Dennis was defeated by Josh Bodom. The pair had a rematch on 8 January 2017, where Dennis lost against to Bodom. On 5 February 2017, Dennis faced off and eventually lost against Dave Mastiff. On 5 May 2017, Zack Gibson defeated Dennis. On 9 April 2017, Dennis lost against Rob Lias. On 7 May 2017, Dennis lost against Gideon Grey. On 4 June 2017, Dennis lost against Donovan Dijak. On 2 July 2017, Dennis was defeated by Sami Callihan. On 6 August 2017, Dennis lost against T.K Cooper. On 17 August 2017, Dennis lost to Martin Stone. On 3 September 2017, Dennis was defeated by El Phantasmo. On 1 October 2017, David Starr won against Eddie Dennis. On 15 October 2017, Dennis was defeated by Chris Brookes. On 22 October 2017, Dennis was beaten by Moose. On 5 November 2017, Rob Lias won against Dennis due to a disqualification. On 8 December 2017, Dennis lost against Pete Dunne. On 7 January 2018, Gideon Grey defeated Dennis by disqualification. On 27 March 2023 at the Revolution Rumble event, Dennis announced his retirement from in-ring competition.

=== Progress Wrestling (2013–2022) ===
Dennis debuted on 31 March 2013, at Chapter Six: We Heart Violence, where he and Mark Andrews went under the tag team name Team Defend, losing to The Bhangra Knights (Darrell Allen & RJ Singh). At Chapter Seven: Every Saint Has A Past, Every Sinner Has A Future, Dennis would defeat Darrell Allen, Joey Lakeside and Xander Cooper in a four-way elimination match. At Chapter Eight: The Big Boys Guide To Strong Style, Dennis would compete in a Three-Way match against Darrell Allen and Doug Williams, where Dennis would be defeated by Williams. At Chapter Nine: Hold Me, Thrill Me, Kick Me, Kill Me, Dennis would be defeated by Paul Robinson. At Chapter Eleven: To Fight War, You Must Become War, Eddie Dennis and Mark Andrews defeated Paul Robinson and Will Ospreay Dennis won his first championship on 30 March 2014, during Chapter Twelve: We're Gonna Need A Bigger Room. Dennis and Andrews under the team name FSU won a tournament final three-way, defeating teams Mark Haskins & Nathan Cruz and Project Ego (Kris Travis & Martin Kirby). At Chapter 13: Unbelievable Jeff, Dennis was defeated by Michael Gilbert. At Chapter 14: Thunderbastard, FSU (Mark Andrews and Eddie Dennis) would successfully defend their tag team championships against The London Riots (James Davis and Rob Lynch). On Chapter 15: Just Because You're Paranoid, Doesn't Mean They Aren't Out To Get You, Dennis teamed up with Mark Andrews, Noam Dar and Will Ospreay to defeat James Davis, Jimmy Havoc, Paul Robinson and Rob Lynch in an 8-man tag match. They would retain the tag titles over the course of the year, successfully defending them on 30 November, at Chapter 16, defeating team Screw Indy Wrestling (Martin Stone & Sha Samuels). On 25 January 2015, Dennis would face off against his partner, Mark Andrews where Dennis would defeat Andrews and deliver a promo about Andrews' contract at TNA and his own application to be a headmaster. Five days later, on 30 January 2015, at Chapter 17, Team FSU lost the tag titles to the team referred to as The Faceless. On 23 July 2017, Dennis faced off against Pete Dunne, where Dennis would lose the match. On 8 May 2018, whilst on a tour in the US, Eddie Dennis would face off against Ricky Shane Page, where Dennis defeated RSP. On 30 September 2018, Dennis would face Mark Andrews at a TLC match, with the winner earning an opportunity to compete on the next Unboxing event, which ended in Dennis winning the match. On 12 November 2018, Dennis faced "Speedball" Mike Bailey, where Dennis defeated Bailey. On 26 November 2018, Dennis faced Mark Haskins, the match ending with Dennis winning the match. On 12 December 2018, at Unboxing 3, Dennis faced Marcel Barthel, where Dennis would beat Barthel. In later matches during the course of his time in Progress Wrestling, Dennis would wrestle with individuals all of whom would become future WWE NXT UK roster members including Zack Gibson, Mark Andrews, "Wild Boar" Mike Hitchman, El Ligero, Dave Mastiff, Nixon Newell and others.

=== WWE (2018–2022, 2023) ===
Dennis made his televised debut during the 7 November 2018 episode NXT UK, during which he defeated Sid Scala. His final match of the year was during the 26 December episode of NXT UK, defeating Dan Moloney by disqualification.

Dennis returned the following year on the 2 January 2019 episode of NXT UK, during which his match against Dave Mastiff ended in double-disqualification. On 12 January at NXT UK TakeOver: Blackpool, Dennis met Mastiff in a rematch under No Disqualification rules, but lost to Mastiff. On the 23 January episode, 2019, of NXT UK, Dennis defeated Jamie Ahmed. On the 20 March 2019, episode of NXT UK, Dennis defeated Ligero. On 12 January 2020, at Takeover: Blackpool 2, Dennis defeated Trent Seven. The way he won the match at Takeover caused a rematch between the two in a Steel Corners Street Fight on 6 February, where Seven defeated Dennis.

On 18 August 2022, Dennis was released from his WWE contract. In February 2023, he started his new role with the company as a producer and writer for the NXT brand. He left the role nine months later, after requesting his release in November 2023.

== Personal life ==
Dennis is the co-founder of "Defend Indy Wrestling", a clothing brand for independent wrestling fans. Inspired by the "Defend Pop Punk" message propagated by American band Man Overboard, Dennis created the brand in 2011 with fellow British wrestlers Pete Dunne and Mark Andrews, producing t-shirts, hoodies and other accessories.

== Championships and accomplishments ==
- Attack! Pro Wrestling
  - Attack! Championship (3 time, inaugural)
  - Attack! 24:7 Championship (4 time)
  - Attack Championship Tournament (2016)
- Burning Heart Pro Wrestling
  - Burning Heart Tag Team Championship (1 time) – with Mark Andrews
- Entertainment Wrestling Association
  - EWA Championship (1 time)
- Pro Wrestling Chaos
  - King Of Chaos Championship (2 time)
  - Knights Of Chaos Championship (1 time, inaugural) – with Alex Steele
  - Knights of Chaos Championship Tournament (2016)
- Pro Wrestling Illustrated
  - Ranked No. 213 of the top 500 singles wrestlers in the PWI 500 in 2019
- Progress Wrestling
  - Progress World Championship (1 time)
  - Progress Tag Team Championship (1 time) – with Mark Andrews
  - Progress Tag Team Title Tournament (2014) – with Mark Andrews
- South Coast Wrestling
  - One To Watch Trophy Championship (1 time)
- Triple X Wrestling
  - TXW Championship (1 time)
