= Kid Lykos II =

English wrestler (born 2002)

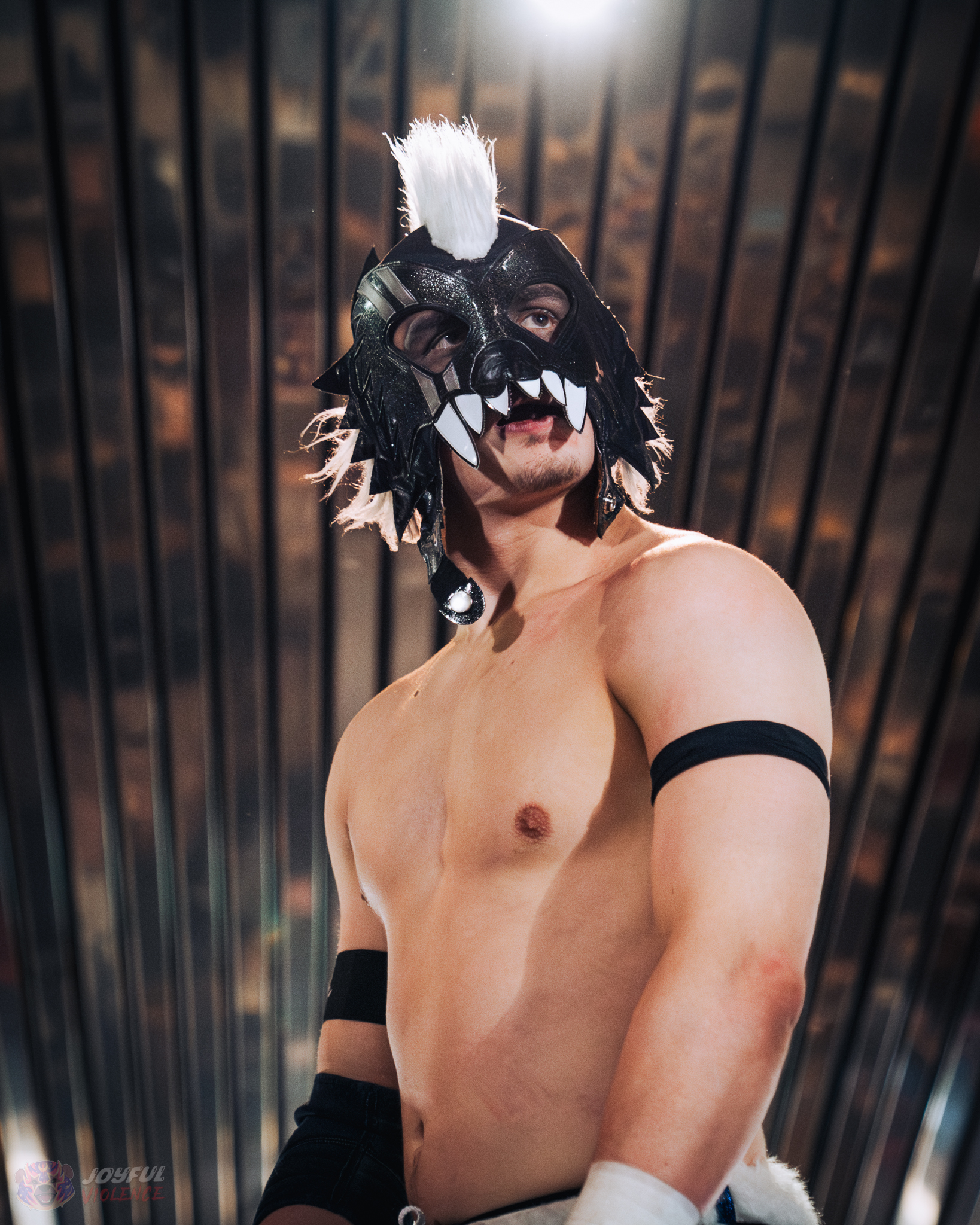
- Kid Lykos II in April 2024

Personal information
- Born: 8 July 2002 (age 24) Wakefield, England

Professional wrestling career
- Ring name(s): Lil Cadet Nelson; Joe Nelson; Kid Lykos II
- Debut: 2016

Joe Newboult (born 8 July 2002) – better known by his ring name Kid Lykos II – is an English professional wrestler who is primarily known for his work in the British professional wrestling promotions: Progress Wrestling, Revolution Pro Wrestling, Attack! Pro Wrestling. Most of his career, he competed as a masked luchador. He is also currently performs for with promotions from the European independent scene.

== Professional wrestling career ==
=== British independent circuit (2016–present) ===
Newboult made his professional wrestling debut at 4GW Saturday Night Storm Rising, a house show promoted by 4th Generation Wrestling on 6 August 2016, when he defeated Tiger Jr. in singles competition. Newboult shared brief or longer tenures with various promotions from the British independent scene such as Attack! Pro Wrestling, Progress Wrestling, Revolution Pro Wrestling, International Pro Wrestling: United Kingdom (IPW:UK), Defiant Wrestling and many others.

=== TNT Extreme Wrestling (2020–present) ===
Newboult made his debut in TNT Extreme Wrestling under the ring name of "Joe Nelson" at TNT DOA Death Match Tournament 2020 on 30 January, when he defeated Nico Angelo in a dark match. During his tenure with the promotion, Newboult has won the TNT Tag Team Championship on one occasion alongside Kid Lykos, and the TNT Ultra X Championship, and competed in various major events promoted by the company. At TNT vs. GCW, a cross-over promoted alongside Game Changer Wrestling on 15 September 2023, he teamed up with Kid Lykos to defeat Los Vipers (Arez and Látigo).

=== Progress Wrestling (2021–present) ===
Newboult made his debut in Progress Wrestling at the 2021 edition of the Natural Progression Series where he fell short to Ethan Allen in the first rounds. As for the Super Strong Style 16 tournament, he made his first appearance at the 2024 edition of the competition, where he defeated Gene Munny in the first rounds, then fell short to Luke Jacobs in the second ones. Newboult teamed up with Kid Lykos and took part in a tournament final for the vacant PROGRESS Tag Team Championship in which they obtained a bye in the first rounds, then defeated Smokin' Aces (Charlie Sterling and Nick Riley) in the semifinals and The Young Guns (Ethan Allen and Luke Jacobs) in the finals at Chapter 112: The Flowers Are Still Standing! on 5 June 2021, to win the vacant titles.

Newboult also competed in some of the promotion's flagship events. At Progress Chapter 165: Diamond Dust on 7 March 2024 he fell short to El Hijo de Dr. Wagner Jr. in singles competition. At Progress Chapter 166: Freedom Walks Again on 5 April 2024, he win a seven-way scramble match in which he outmatched Cody Chhun, Gringo Loco, Leon Slater, Marcus Mathers, Simon Miller and Tate Mayfairs. At Progress Chapter 167: One Bump Or Two? on 21 April 2024, Newboult teamed up with Kid Lykos to unsuccessfully challenge Sanity (Big Damo and Axel Tischer) for the PROGRESS Tag Team Championship in the main event.

Newboult also competed at Fantastica Mania, a series of cross-over events mainly promoted by Consejo Mundial de Lucha Libre (CMLL) and also featuring wrestlers from various promotions of Europe and Japan independent circuits. He made his first appearance at the 2023 UK edition where, in the first show, he teamed up with Kid Lykos and Sangre Imperial in a losing effort against Audaz, Ricky Knight Jr. and Zak Knight, and in the second show again alongside Lykos and Zandokan Jr. in a losing effort against Subculture (Mark Andrews and Flash Morgan Webster) and Titán as a result of a Trios match. On the first event of the 2024 edition, he and Lykos teamed up with Shigeo Okumura in a losing effort against Atlantis, Atlantis Jr. and Dulce Gardenia.

=== Revolution Pro Wrestling (2021–present) ===
Newboult made his debut in Revolution Pro Wrestling at RevPro Epic Encounters 8 on 7 February 2021, when he defeated Connor Mills. He soon started chasing for titles promoted by RevPro. At RevPro Epic Encounters 9 on 15 March 2021, he unsuccessfully challenged Michael Oku for the Undisputed British Cruiserweight Championship. At RevPro Opportunity Knocks on 4 September 2021 Newboult teamed up with Kid Lykos and unsuccessfully challenged Destination Everywhere (Connor Mills and Michael Oku) for the British Tag Team Championship.

Newboult competed in one of the promotion's signature events, the Great British Tag League, where at the 2023 edition, he teamed up with Kid Lykos and placed themselves in the Block A of the competition where they scored a total of six points after going against the teams of The Billington Bulldogs (Mark Billington and Thomas Billington), Kieron Lacey and Mark Trew, and Anthony Ogogo.

== Professional wrestling style and persona ==
Since debuting for Progress Wrestling in 2021, Newboult competed as a luchador enmascarado (masked wrestler). However, contrary to the lucha libre traditions, his real name was a matter of public record all along. He shares the same type of wrestling gimmick with Kid Lykos (Ethan Beach), as they've been competing under the tag name of "Lykos Gym" since 2021.

== Championships and accomplishments ==
- 4th Generation Wrestling
  - 4GW Airborne Championship (2 times)
- Attack! Pro Wrestling
  - Attack! 24/7 Championship (1 time)
  - Attack! Tag Team Championship (1 time) – with Chris Brookes
- Breed Pro Wrestling
  - Breed Pro New Breed Championship (1 time, inaugural final)
- Catch Pro Wrestling
  - Great British Heritage Tournament (2020)
- Hope Wrestling
  - Hope Kings Of Flight Championship (2 times)
  - Hope Young Guns Championship (1 time)
- North Wrestling
  - North Tag Team Championship (1 time) – with Kid Lykos
- Progress Wrestling
  - PROGRESS Tag Team Championship (2 times) – with Kid Lykos
  - PROGRESS Tag Team Title Tournament (2021) – with Kid Lykos
- Pro Wrestling Illustrated
  - Ranked No. 263 of the top 500 singles wrestlers in the PWI 500 of 2021
  - Ranked No. 66 of the top 100 tag teams in the PWI Tag Team 100 of 2023 – with Kid Lykos
- Target Wrestling
  - Target Wrestling Tag Team Championship (1 time) – with Kid Lykos
- Tidal Championship Wrestling
  - TCW Championship (1 time)
- TNT Extreme Wrestling
  - TNT Tag Team Championship (1 time) – with Kid Lykos
  - TNT Ultra X Championship (1 time, inaugural)
  - TNT Ultra X Championship Tournament (2020)

Classement PWI 500
Year	2021
Rank	263
