= Cara Noir =

English professional wrestler

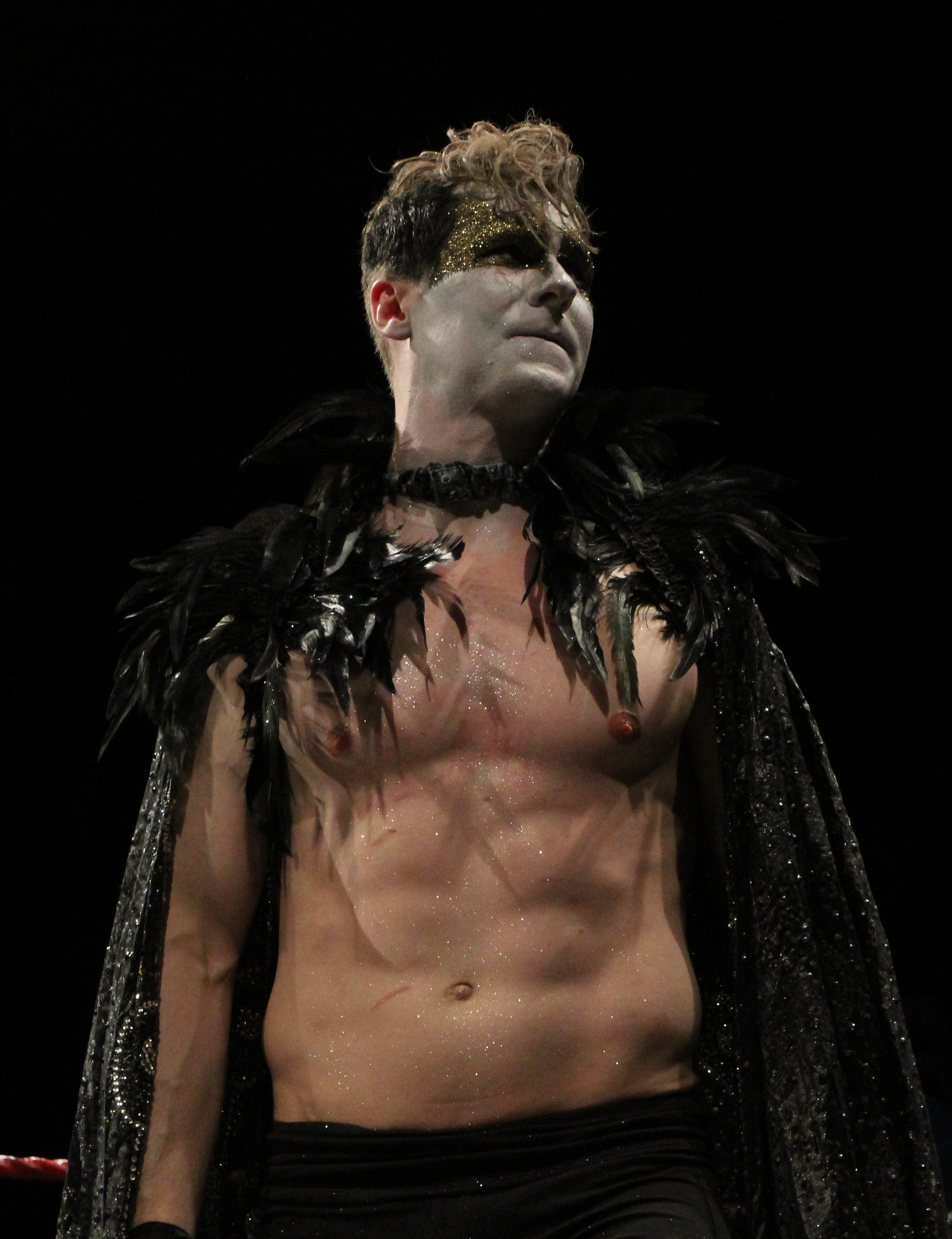
- Cara Noir in March 2020 at 16 Carat Gold

Personal information
- Born: Thomas Edward Dawkins; April 1987 (age 39)
- Education: De Montfort University
- Website: caranoir.com

Professional wrestling career
- Ring name(s): Cara Noir; Dark Lord; El Pavo Real; Pure Britannico; Tom Dawkins; Thomas Dawkins
- Billed height: 6 ft 0 in (183 cm)
- Billed weight: 198 lb (90 kg)
- Trained by: Julia Knight; London School of Lucha Libre
- Debut: 13 June 2010

Thomas Edward Dawkins (born April 1987), better known by his ring name Cara Noir, is an English professional wrestler, He performs on the British independent circuit, notable for Progress Wrestling, where he is the current and record-setting three-time Progress Men's World Champion. His character has been described as the black swan of professional wrestling, and is noted for his distinctive moveset, owing to previous involvement in ballet, dance, and mixed martial arts.

== Professional wrestling career ==
Following minimal success under his birth name and other pseudonyms, a conversation with Chris Brookes saw him develop the character of Cara Noir, which he debuted in January 2017. Initially a heel, he quickly became a face, largely due in part to his elaborate entrance in which he comes out to the famous pas de trois as used in the revival of Tchaikovsky's Swan Lake. In July 2019, his breakthrough moment happened while wrestling for Riptide, with his performance in a defeat to Pac being critically acclaimed.

In September 2019, Noir began wrestling for Progress, first appearing at the Natural Progression Series tournament, where he was defeated by eventual winner Scotty Davis, and then at Chapter 95, where he was defeated by Pete Dunne. From October to December, he was involved in a series of matches with Ilja Dragunov. Having traded wins over each other at Chapter 96 and Chapter 97, the feud was ended at Chapter 99 in a two out of three falls match, in which Noir won. At Chapter 100, Noir won a title shot for Eddie Dennis' Progress Unified World Championship, but Dennis had to vacate the title due to injury, and in January 2020, at Chapter 101, Noir defeated Dragunov, Kyle Fletcher and Paul Robinson in a four-way match to win the title.

In January 2020, Noir appeared in Westside Xtreme Wrestling (wXw), confronting Marius Al-Ani, and confirming his participation in the promotion's annual 16 Carat Gold tournament. At the event, he defeated Al-Ani, Jeff Cobb and Eddie Kingston on his way to the final, where he overcame crowd favourite Mike Bailey in a rare face vs. face contest. Noir returned to wXw later in the year for the Catch Grand Prix. He tied the block alongside Metehan with nine points, and made the final because of their head-to-head record in the tournament. He faced Al-Ani in the final (who had since gone on a winning streak since their previous matchup), in which he was pinned in the eleventh round. Cara Noir joined Japan's Dramatic Dream Team (DDT) in 2022, where he challenged Yuki Ueno in an unsuccessful attempt to win the DDT Universal Championship. Noir suffered three fractures to his foot during a cage match in April 2023. He made his return in August 2024 at Progress Chapter 170.

== Personal life ==
Before beginning a career in wrestling, Dawkins was enrolled at the prestigious Royal Ballet School on a scholarship, but he was kicked out because of anger management issues. Outside of wrestling, he works as a personal trainer, and co-founded Reset Lab, an alternative health and fitness company, with his partner. He graduated from De Montfort University in 2010, where he was a member of the rugby union first team.

== Championship and accomplishments ==
- Attack! Pro Wrestling
  - Attack! Championship (1 time)
  - Attack! 24:7 Championship (4 times)
- Hope Wrestling
  - Hope Championship (1 time)
  - Hope Kings Of Flight Championship (1 time)
- International Pro Wrestling: United Kingdom
  - Z-Force Championship (1 time)
- LDN Wrestling
  - LDN Academy Championship (1 time)
- Pro Wrestling Illustrated
  - Ranked No. 72 of the top 500 singles wrestlers in the PWI 500 in 2020
- Progress Wrestling
  - Progress Men's World Championship (Note: The title was called the Progress Unified World Championship in his first reign.) (3 times, current)
- Westside Xtreme Wrestling
  - 16 Carat Gold Tournament (2020)
