= 2025 in professional wrestling =

2025 in professional wrestling describes the year's events in the world of professional wrestling.

== List of promotions ==
These promotions held events throughout 2025.

Promotion Name	Abbreviation	Notes
1 Fall Wrestling	1FW	
AAW Wrestling	AAW	The "AAW" abbreviation has been used since 2007 and had previously stood for the promotion's original name All American Wrestling.
All Elite Wrestling	AEW	
All Japan Pro Wrestling	AJPW	
Combat Zone Wrestling	CZW	
Consejo Mundial de Lucha Libre	CMLL	
CyberFight	CF	CyberFight is an umbrella brand that oversees and promotes three individual promotions: DDT Pro-Wrestling (DDT), Pro Wrestling Noah (Noah), and Tokyo Joshi Pro Wrestling (TJPW).
Deadlock Pro-Wrestling	DPW	
DEFY Wrestling	DEFY	
Dragongate	DG	
Dream Star Fighting Marigold	Marigold	
Game Changer Wrestling	GCW	
German Wrestling Federation	GWF	
House of Glory	HOG	
Juggalo Championship Wrestling	JCW	
Lucha Libre AAA Worldwide	AAA	The "AAA" abbreviation has been used since the mid-1990s and had previously stood for the promotion's original name Asistencia Asesoría y Administración. Acquired by WWE in April.
Major League Wrestling	MLW	
Maple Leaf Pro Wrestling	MLP	Relaunch of the former Maple Leaf Wrestling, acquired by Scott D'Amore.
National Wrestling Alliance	NWA	
New Japan Pro-Wrestling	NJPW	
Progress Wrestling	PROGRESS	
Pro Wrestling Zero1	Zero1	
Revolution Pro Wrestling	RevPro	
Ring of Honor	ROH	
Total Nonstop Action Wrestling	TNA	
Westside Xtreme Wrestling	wXw	
Women of Wrestling	WOW	
World Wonder Ring Stardom	Stardom	
WWE	—	"WWE" stands for World Wrestling Entertainment, which remains the company's legal name, though the company ceased using the full name in April 2011, with the WWE abbreviation becoming an orphaned initialism. WWE divided its roster into four storyline divisions – referred to as brands where wrestlers exclusively performed on their respective weekly television programs. Raw and SmackDown were their two main brands, while NXT and Evolve served as their developmental territories. WWE ID was another developmental program for wrestlers on the independent circuit.

== Calendar of notable shows ==
=== January ===
Date	Promotion(s)	Event	Location	Venue	Main Event	Notes
1	AEW	Fight for the Fallen	Asheville, North Carolina	Harrah's Cherokee Center	Rated FTR (Cope, Cash Wheeler, and Dax Harwood) defeated Death Riders (Jon Moxley, Claudio Castagnoli, and Wheeler Yuta)	Aired as a special episode of Dynamite.
1	CMLL	Sin Salida	Mexico City, Mexico	Arena Mexico	Kaligua loses his mask in a 12-way steel cage match against Último Dragoncito, Shockercito, Pequeño Pierroth, Galaxy, Pequeño Magia, Angelito, Full Metal, Rostro de Acero, Pequeño Pólvora, Pequeño Olímpico, and Pequeño Violencia	
1	CF: Noah	The New Year	Tokyo, Japan	Nippon Budokan	Ozawa defeated Kaito Kiyomiya (c) to win the GHC Heavyweight Championship	
3	CMLL	Infierno en el Ring	Guadalajara, Mexico	Arena Coliseo Guadalajara	Exterminador loses his hair in a 12-way cage match against Buffon, El Malayo, Funebre and Hijo del Soberano, Infierno, Javier Cruz Jr., Malefico, Mr. Trueno, Rey Apocalipsis, Rey Trueno, and Siki Osama Jr.	
3	Stardom	New Year Dream	Tokyo, Japan	Tokyo Garden Theater	Neo Genesis (Suzu Suzuki and Starlight Kid) defeated H.A.T.E. (Saya Kamitani and Momo Watanabe)	
3	Marigold	First Dream	Tokyo, Japan	Ota City General Gymnasium	Utami Hayashishita defeated Sareee (c) to win the Marigold World Championship	
4	NJPW	Wrestle Kingdom 19	Tokyo, Japan	Tokyo Dome	Zack Sabre Jr. (c) defeated Shota Umino to retain the IWGP World Heavyweight Championship	
4	CF: TJPW	Tokyo Joshi Pro	Tokyo, Japan	Korakuen Hall	Mizuki defeated Miu Watanabe (c) to win the Princess of Princess Championship	
5	AEW; CMLL; NJPW; ROH; Stardom	Wrestle Dynasty	Tokyo, Japan	Tokyo Dome	Zack Sabre Jr. (c) defeated Ricochet to retain the IWGP World Heavyweight Championship	
5	GWF	Strike First, Strike Hard 5	Berlin, Germany	Festsaal Kreuzberg	Peter Tihanyi (c) defeated Mark Haskins to retain the GWF World Championship	
6	NJPW	New Year Dash!!	Tokyo, Japan	Ota City General Gymnasium	Chaos (Hirooki Goto, Rocky Romero, Yoh, and Yoshi-Hashi) defeated TMDK (Kosei Fujita, Robbie Eagles, Ryohei Oiwa, and Zack Sabre Jr.)	
6	WWE: Raw; SmackDown	Raw premiere on Netflix	Inglewood, California	Intuit Dome	CM Punk defeated Seth "Freakin" Rollins	First episode of Raw on Netflix; Featured appearances from The Undertaker, Jimmy Hart, and Hulk Hogan, and various celebrities, including Travis Scott and Vanessa Hudgens.
7	WWE: NXT	New Year's Evil	Los Angeles, California	Shrine Auditorium and Expo Hall	Oba Femi defeated Trick Williams (c) and Eddy Thorpe to win the NXT Championship	Aired as a special episode of NXT. Featured an appearance from The Rock.
9	REVOLVER	Vybe Check	Dayton, Ohio	Calumet Center	Masato Tanaka defeated Jake Crist in a Dayton Street Fight	Featured the in-ring debut of YouTuber BDE.
10	GCW	Sorry Pal	Rochester, New York	Water Street Music Hall	Mance Warner (c) defeated Drew Parker and Ciclope in a three-way hardcore match to retain the GCW World Championship	
10	West Coast Pro	Only the Strong Survive	San Francisco, California	State Room	Jake Something defeated Masato Tanaka	
11	MLW	Kings of Colosseum	North Richland Hills, Texas	NYTEX Sports Centre	Matt Riddle defeated Satoshi Kojima (c) to win the MLW World Heavyweight Championship	
11	MLW	Reloaded	North Richland Hills, Texas	NYTEX Sports Centre	Místico (c) defeated Bárbaro Cavernario 2–1 in a two out of three falls match to retain the MLW World Middleweight Championship	Aired on tape delay on January 25.
11	NWA	Shockwave	Forney, Texas	OC Theater	Thom Latimer (c) defeated Carnage to retain the NWA Worlds Heavyweight Championship	Taping for Powerrr.
11	NJPW	Battle in the Valley	San Jose, California	San Jose Civic	El Desperado (c) defeated Taiji Ishimori to retain the IWGP Junior Heavyweight Championship	
11	GCW	Thank Me Later	Columbus, Ohio	Valley Dale Ballroom	Effy and Gahbage Daddies (Alec Price and Cole Radrick) defeated Mance Warner and Violence is Forever (Dominic Garrini and Kevin Ku)	
11	Prestige	Roseland X	Portland, Oregon	Roseland Theater	Kevin Blackwood defeated Masato Tanaka	
11	CF: Noah	Star Navigation Premium; Night 1	Tokyo, Japan	Korakuen Hall	Tetsuya Endo defeated Manabu Soya (c) to win the GHC National Championship	
13	Marigold	New Year's Golden Garden; Night 1	Nagoya, Japan	Nagoya Chunichi Hall	Utami Hayashishita (c) defeated Tank to retain the Marigold World Championship	Aired on tape delay on January 17.
15	AEW	Maximum Carnage	Cincinnati, Ohio	Andrew J. Brady Music Center	Jon Moxley (c) defeated Powerhouse Hobbs to retain the AEW World Championship	Aired as a special episode of Dynamite.
16	AEW	Maximum Carnage	Cincinnati, Ohio	Andrew J. Brady Music Center	Powerhouse Hobbs, The Outrunners (Truth Magnum and Turbo Floyd), and Rated FTR (Dax Harwood, Cash Wheeler, and Cope) defeated Death Riders (Jon Moxley, Claudio Castagnoli, and Wheeler Yuta) and The Learning Tree (Chris Jericho, Big Bill, and Bryan Keith)	Aired on tape delay on January 18 as a special episode of Collision.
17	HOG	Watch the Throne	Chicago, Illinois	Logan Square Auditorium	Mike Santana (c) defeated Ricky Starks by disqualification to retain the HOG Heavyweight Championship	
17	DPW	You Already Know	Ridgefield Park, New Jersey	Ridgefield Park Knights of Columbus	Jake Something (c) defeated Ace Austin to retain the DPW Worlds Championship	Aired on tape delay on January 21.
19	Marigold	New Year's Golden Garden; Night 2	Tokyo, Japan	Shin-Kiba 1st Ring	Nanae Takahashi and Seri Yamaoka defeated Bozilla and Tank (c) to win the Marigold Twin Star Championship	
19	NJPW	Wrestling Life 40th Anniversary Yuji Nagata Blue Justice XV	Sakura, Japan	Sakura Civic Gymnasium	Yuji Nagata, Oleg Boltin, and Be-Bop Tag Team (Hiroshi Tanahashi and Toru Yano) defeated House of Torture (Ren Narita, Sho, Yoshinobu Kanemaru, and Yujiro Takahashi)	
19	TNA	Genesis	Garland, Texas	Curtis Culwell Center	Joe Hendry defeated Nic Nemeth (c) to win the TNA World Championship	Featured appearances from John Layfield and NXT superstars Ashante "Thee" Adonis, Nathan Frazer, Axiom, and Cora Jade.
19	GCW	The People vs. GCW	New York City, New York	Hammerstein Ballroom	Effy defeated Mance Warner (c) to win the GCW World Championship	
25	AEW	Homecoming	Jacksonville, Florida	Daily's Place	Konosuke Takeshita (c) defeated Katsuyori Shibata to retain the AEW International Championship	Aired as a special episode of Collision.
25	GCW; BZW	Enter the Zone	Bapaume, France	Espace Isabelle de Hainaut	Effy (c) defeated Connor Mills to retain the GCW World Championship	First GCW event in France; Aired on tape delay on January 30.
25	HOG	Final Warning	New York City, New York	NYC Arena	Mike Santana (c) defeated Kenta to retain the HOG Heavyweight Championship	
25	DG	The Gate of Bayside	Yokohama, Japan	Yokohama Budokan	Yamato (c) defeated Strong Machine J to retain the Open the Dream Gate Championship	
25	WWE: Raw; SmackDown	Saturday Night's Main Event XXXVIII	San Antonio, Texas	Frost Bank Center	Gunther (c) defeated Jey Uso to retain the World Heavyweight Championship	
26	GCW	Live in London	London, England	Electric Ballroom	Effy (c) defeated Cara Noir to retain the GCW World Championship	First GCW event in London.
26	DPW	Title Fight in Texas	Pasadena, Texas	Pasadena Convention Center and Municipal Fairgrounds	Dani Luna defeated Miyuki Takase (c) to win the DPW Women's Worlds Championship	Aired on tape delay on February 2.
26	CF: DDT	New Year, New Hero	Tokyo, Japan	Korakuen Hall	Chris Brookes (c) defeated Shuji Ishikawa to retain the KO-D Openweight Championship	
31	GCW	Up All Night	Indianapolis, Indiana	Fountain Square Theatre	Gringo Loco defeated Calvin Tankman	
31	REVOLVER	Square Game	Indianapolis, Indiana	Fountain Square Theatre	Myron Reed (c) defeated Trey Miguel to retain the REVOLVER World Championship	
(c) – denotes defending champion(s)

=== February ===
Date	Promotion(s)	Event	Location	Venue	Main Event	Notes
1	WWE: Raw; SmackDown	Royal Rumble	Indianapolis, Indiana	Lucas Oil Stadium	Jey Uso won the 30-man Royal Rumble match by last eliminating John Cena to earn a world championship match at WrestleMania 41	First Royal Rumble not to be held in January.
1	GWF	Global Warning	Berlin, Germany	Festsaal Kreuzberg	Peter Tihanyi and Mustafa Ali defeated Blutsbrüder (Erkan Sulcani and Georg Asgolar)	
2	Stardom	Supreme Fight	Tokyo, Japan	Korakuen Hall	Saya Kamitani (c) defeated Suzu Suzuki to retain the World of Stardom Championship	
5	Stardom	New Blood 18	Tokyo, Japan	Tokyo Square in Itabashi	God's Eye (Ranna Yagami and Nanami) and Himiko defeated Cosmic Angels (Yuna Mizumori, Aya Sakura and Sayaka Kurara)	
7	DEFY	Hundredth - 8 Year Anniversary	Seattle, Washington	Washington Hall	Ricky Starks defeated Kenta (c) to win the DEFY World Championship	
8	MLW	SuperFight 6	Atlanta, Georgia	Center Stage	Matt Riddle (c) defeated Alex Kane and Satoshi Kojima to retain the MLW World Heavyweight Championship	
8	MLW	Intimidation Games	Atlanta, Georgia	Center Stage	Filthy Bros (Matt Riddle and Tom Lawlor) vs. Contra Unit (Mads Krule Krügger and Ikuro Kwon) ended in a no contest	Aired on tape delay on March 8.
11	NJPW	The New Beginning in Osaka	Osaka, Japan	Osaka Prefectural Gymnasium	Hirooki Goto defeated Zack Sabre Jr. (c) to win the IWGP World Heavyweight Championship	
11	CF: Noah	Star Navigation Premium; Night 2	Tokyo, Japan	Korakuen Hall	Ozawa (c) defeated Galeno del Mal to retain the GHC Heavyweight Championship	Featured the first block matches of the 2025 edition of the Global Junior Heavyweight Tag League.
14	Progress	Chapter 176: For The Love of Progress 3	Manchester, England	Bowlers BEC Arena	Simon Miller (c) defeated Charles Crowley to retain the Progress Proteus Championship	
14	JCW	Juggalo Weekend	Worcester, Massachusetts	Worcester Palladium	Willie Mack (c) defeated Matt Cross to retain the JCW Heavyweight Championship	Aired on tape delay on February 27 and March 13 as episodes of JCW Lunacy
15	JCW	Juggalo Weekend	Worcester, Massachusetts	Worcester Palladium	Willie Mack (c) defeated The Misfit to retain the JCW Heavyweight Championship	Aired on tape delay on March 20 as episodes of JCW Lunacy
15	AEW	Grand Slam Australia	Brisbane, Queensland, Australia	Brisbane Entertainment Centre	"Timeless" Toni Storm defeated Mariah May (c) to win the AEW Women's World Championship	AEW's first event in Australia, aired as a standalone television special.
15	AEW; ROH	Global Wars Australia	Brisbane, Queensland, Australia	Brisbane Entertainment Centre	Athena (c) defeated Alex Windsor to retain the ROH Women's World Championship	First Global Wars event in Australia. Aired on tape delay on February 17.
15	WWE: NXT	Vengeance Day	Washington, D.C.	CareFirst Arena	Giulia (c) defeated Roxanne Perez, Cora Jade, and Bayley to retain the NXT Women's Championship	
15	GCW	Jersey J-Cup	Jersey City, New Jersey	White Eagle Hall	Gabe Kidd defeated Homicide	
16	GCW	Jersey J-Cup	Jersey City, New Jersey	White Eagle Hall	Masha Slamovich (c) defeated Alec Price in the Jersey J-Cup final to retain the JCW World Championship	
16	DPW	No Pressure	Chicago, Illinois	Logan Square Auditorium	Dani Luna (c) defeated Hyan in a Chicago Street Fight to retain the DPW Women's Worlds Championship	Aired on tape delay on February 23.
20	Marigold	New Year's Golden Garden; Night 3	Tokyo, Japan	Korakuen Hall	Nanae Takahashi and Seri Yamaoka (c) defeated Utami Hayashishita and Victoria Yuzuki to retain the Marigold Twin Star Championship	
23	Progress	Chapter 177: My Own Destiny	London, England	Electric Ballroom	Meiko Satomura defeated Rhio	
24	Stardom	Path of Thunder	Utsunomiya, Japan	Light Cube Utsunomiya	Starlight Kid (c) defeated Rina to retain the Wonder of Stardom Championship	
28	GCW	I Feel So	National City, California	The Primal Compound	Drew Parker defeated Arez	
(c) – denotes defending champion(s)

=== March ===
Date	Promotion(s)	Event	Location	Venue	Main Event	Notes
1	WWE: Raw; SmackDown	Elimination Chamber: Toronto	Toronto, Ontario, Canada	Rogers Centre	John Cena defeated CM Punk, Drew McIntyre, Logan Paul, Damian Priest, and Seth "Freakin" Rollins in the Men's Elimination Chamber match to earn an Undisputed WWE Championship match at WrestleMania 41	After the main event, Cena turned heel for the first time since November 2003.
1	GCW	The Coldest Winter 3	Los Angeles, California	Ukrainian Culture Center	Mance Warner defeated Ciclope	
1	Stardom	New Blood 19	Tokyo, Japan	Shinagawa Intercity Hall	Rice or Bread (Waka Tsukiyama and Hanako) (c) defeated Nanami and Himiko to retain the New Blood Tag Team Championship	
2	CF: Noah	Memorial Voyage in Yokohama	Yokohama, Japan	Yokohama Budokan	Taishi Ozawa (Heavyweight) defeated Manabu Soya (National) in a Winner Takes All Lumberjack Deathmatch to retain the GHC Heavyweight Championship and win the GHC National Championship	
2	GCW	Just Being Honest	Mesa, Arizona	Nile Theater	Dr. Redacted defeated Ciclope in a Deathmatch	
2	GWF	Chaos City 10	Berlin, Germany	Festsaal Kreuzberg	Big and Perfect (Toni Harting and Big Nik) defeated Two Sweet Heroes (Aytaç Bahar and Pascal Spalter) (c) in a Losing Team Must Split Up Chaos City match to win the GWF Tag Team Championship	
6	NJPW	NJPW 53rd Anniversary Show	Tokyo, Japan	Ota City General Gymnasium	Hirooki Goto (c) defeated Hiroshi Tanahashi to retain the IWGP World Heavyweight Championship	
6	REVOLVER	No More Sorrow	Dayton, Ohio	Calumet Center	Myron Reed (c) defeated Zachary Wentz to retain the REVOLVER World Championship	
9	AEW	Revolution	Los Angeles, California	Crypto.com Arena	Jon Moxley (c) defeated Cope and Christian Cage to retain the AEW World Championship	First AEW PPV to stream on Amazon Prime Video.
11	WWE: NXT	Roadblock	New York City, New York	The Theater at Madison Square Garden	Stephanie Vaquer (North American) defeated Giulia (NXT) in a Winner Takes All match to retain the NXT Women's North American Championship and win the NXT Women's Championship	Aired as a special episode of NXT.
14	TNA	Sacrifice	El Paso, Texas	El Paso County Coliseum	Joe Hendry, Matt Hardy, Elijah, Leon Slater, and Nic Nemeth defeated The System (Eddie Edwards, Brian Myers, and JDC) and The Colons (Eddie Colón and Orlando Colón) in a Steel Cage 10-man tag team match	
14	MLP	Mayhem	Windsor, Ontario, Canada	St. Clair College	Thom Latimer (c) defeated Bishop Dyer to retain the NWA Worlds Heavyweight Championship	
15	MLP	Mayhem	Windsor, Ontario, Canada	St. Clair College	Intergalactic Jet Setters (Kevin Knight and Kushida) defeated The Undisputed Kingdom (Matt Taven and Mike Bennett)	
15	Stardom	Cinderella Tournament (Final)	Tokyo, Japan	Kariya City Industrial Promotion Center	Starlight Kid (c) defeated Konami to retain the Wonder of Stardom Championship	
15	DEFY	Aftermath	Seattle, Washington	Washington Hall	Clark Connors defeated Starboy Charlie in a Super 8XGP Tournament final to win the vacant DEFY World Championship	Aired on tape delay on April 6.
15	HOG	City of Dreamz	New York City, New York	NYC Arena	The Mane Event (Jay Lyon and Midas Black) defeated The Cold Blooded Killers (Jay Armani, Nolo Kitano and Raheem Royal) (c) by 2–1 in a Title vs. Career three-on-two handicap two out of three falls match to win the HOG Tag Team Championship	
15	GCW	Ashes to Ashes	Atlantic City, New Jersey	Showboat Resort Atlantic City	John Wayne Murdoch defeated Mr. Danger in a Deathmatch	
16	GCW	So Much Fun	Atlantic City, New Jersey	Showboat Resort Atlantic City	Matt Tremont (c) defeated Beastman to retain the GCW Ultraviolent Championship	
16	DPW	Forever	Durham, North Carolina	Durham Armory	Dani Luna (c) defeated Hyan in a Dog Collar match to retain DPW Women's Worlds Championship	Aired on tape delay on March 23.
16	RevPro	Epic Encounter	Wolverhampton, England	The Hangar	Michael Oku (c) defeated 1 Called Manders to retain the Undisputed British Heavyweight Championship	
16	CF: TJPW	Grand Princess	Tokyo, Japan	Ota City General Gymnasium	Mizuki (c) defeated Rika Tatsumi to retain the Princess of Princess Championship	
19	AEW	Slam Dunk Saturday	Ralston, Nebraska	Liberty First Credit Union Arena	The Don Callis Family (Konosuke Takeshita, Lance Archer, and Brian Cage) defeated Rocky Romero, Mark Briscoe, and Powerhouse Hobbs	Aired on tape delay on March 22 as a special one-hour episode of Collision.
19	AEW	Slam Dunk Sunday	Ralston, Nebraska	Liberty First Credit Union Arena	Los Titánes del Aire (Komander and Hologram) defeated La Facción Ingobernable (Dralístico and The Beast Mortos)	Aired on tape delay on March 23 as a special one-hour episode of Collision.
20	NJPW	New Japan Cup (Final)	Niigata, Japan	Aore Nagaoka	David Finlay defeated Shota Umino in the final of the New Japan Cup	
20	CF: DDT	Judgement	Tokyo, Japan	Korakuen Hall	Chris Brookes (c) defeated Masahiro Takanashi to retain the KO-D Openweight Championship	
21	CMLL	Homenaje a Dos Leyendas	Mexico City, Mexico	Arena Mexico	Zandokan Jr. defeated Star Jr. in a Mask vs. Mask match	
22	NWA	Hard Times V	Dothan, Alabama	Dothan Civic Center	Thom Latimer (c) defeated Carson Bartholomew Drake to retain the NWA Worlds Heavyweight Championship	Taping for Powerrr.
22	REVOLVER	Goated	Clive, Iowa	Horizon Events Center	Myron Reed (c) defeated Steve Maclin in a No Disqualification match to retain the REVOLVER World Championship	
22	AAA	Rey de Reyes	Mexico City, Mexico	Gimnasio Olímpico Juan de la Barrera	Alberto El Patrón (c) defeated El Hijo del Vikingo to retain the AAA Mega Championship	
22	West Coast Pro	West Coast Best Coast	San Francisco, California	United Irish Cultural Center	Kevin Blackwood (c) defeated Trevor Lee to retain the West Coast Pro Heavyweight Championship	
22	CF: Noah	Star Navigation Premium; Night 3	Tokyo, Japan	Korakuen Hall	Ozawa (c) defeated Masa Kitamiya to retain the GHC Heavyweight Championship	
27	Stardom	New Blood 20	Tokyo, Japan	Shinagawa Intercity Hall	Rice or Bread (Waka Tsukiyama and Hanako) (c) defeated Sakuradamon (Aya Sakura and Yuna Mizumori) to retain the New Blood Tag Team Championship	
29	GCW	No Compadre	Chicago, Illinois	Thalia Hall	Matt Tremont (c) defeated Otis Cogar to retain the GCW Ultraviolent Championship	
30	Marigold	Spring Victory Series	Tokyo, Japan	Korakuen Hall	Utami Hayashishita (c) defeated Bozilla to retain the Marigold World Championship	
30	Progress	Chapter 178: Fix Your Hearts	London, England	Electric Ballroom	Sunshine Machine (Chuck Mambo and TK Cooper) defeated Smokin' Aces (Charlie Sterling and Nick Riley) (c) to win the PROGRESS Tag Team Championship	
30	GCW	Amerikaz Most Wanted	Sauget, Illinois	Pop's Nightclub	2 Tuff Tony and Mickie Knuckles defeated The Rejects (John Wayne Murdoch and Reed Bentley) in a Deathmatch	
(c) – denotes defending champion(s)

=== April ===
Date	Promotion(s)	Event	Location	Venue	Main Event	Notes
5	MLW	Battle Riot VII	Long Beach, California	Thunder Studios Arena	Matt Riddle (c) won the 40-man Battle Riot match by last eliminating Rob Van Dam to retain the MLW World Heavyweight Championship	
5	NJPW	Sakura Genesis	Tokyo, Japan	Ryōgoku Kokugikan	Hirooki Goto (c) defeated David Finlay to retain the IWGP World Heavyweight Championship	
5	REVOLVER	We Did That	Chicago, Illinois	Logan Square Auditorium	Chicago Over Everything (Mustafa Ali, Gringo Loco, Joe Alonzo, Davey Bang, and August Matthews) defeated Team REVOLVER (Ace Austin, Steve Maclin, Jake Crist, Rich Swann, and Trey Miguel) in a 10-man tag team elimination match	
6	AEW	Dynasty	Philadelphia, Pennsylvania	Liacouras Center	Jon Moxley (c) defeated Swerve Strickland to retain the AEW World Championship	
6	GCW	The Philly Special	Chester, Pennsylvania	Harrah's Philadelphia	Slade defeated Bam Sullivan in a Deathmatch	
11	NJPW	Windy City Riot	Chicago, Illinois	Wintrust Arena	Konosuke Takeshita defeated Hiroshi Tanahashi	Featured Hiroshi Tanahashi's final match in the United States.
12	Prestige	Roseland XI	Portland, Oregon	Roseland Theater	Alan Angels (c) defeated Timothy Thatcher to retain the Prestige World Championship	
13	GWF	Mystery Mayhem	Berlin, Germany	Festsaal Kreuzberg	Metehan defeated Axel Tischer to win the vacant GWF World Championship	
13	DEFY	Streets of Rage	Seattle, Washington	Washington Hall	Sinner & Saint (Judas Icarus and Travis Williams) (c) defeated Kzy and Susumu Yokosuka to retain the DEFY Tag Team Championship	
16	DGUSA	The Rebirth	Paradise, Nevada	Palms Casino Resort	Paradox (Dragon Kid, Susumu Yokosuka and Yamato) defeated Z-Brats (Ishin, Kota Minoura and Shun Skywalker)	First Dragon Gate USA event since 2014.
16	AEW	Spring BreakThru	Boston, Massachusetts	MGM Music Hall at Fenway	The Opps (Samoa Joe, Katsuyori Shibata, and Powerhouse Hobbs) defeated Death Riders (Claudio Castagnoli, Wheeler Yuta, and interim title holder Jon Moxley) (c) to win the AEW World Trios Championship	Aired as a special episode of Dynamite, which marked the show as the longest-running prime time professional wrestling program on Turner Sports.
17	AEW	Spring BreakThru	Boston, Massachusetts	MGM Music Hall at Fenway	Kris Statlander and Julia Hart defeated Mercedes Moné and Harley Cameron	Aired as a special Thursday episode of Collision.
17	DEFY	Living Proof	Paradise, Nevada	Palms Casino Resort	Clark Connors (c) defeated El Phantasmo and Man Like DeReiss to retain the DEFY World Championship	
17	Independent	Mark Hitchcock Memorial SuperShow	Paradise, Nevada	Palms Casino Resort	TMDK (Zack Sabre Jr., Shane Haste, and Bad Dude Tito) defeated Michael Oku, Flip Gordon, and Hechicero	
17	GCW	Josh Barnett's Bloodsport XIII	Paradise, Nevada	Palms Casino Resort	Gabe Kidd defeated Josh Barnett	
17	Progress	Chapter 179: Progress Las Vegas	Paradise, Nevada	Palms Casino Resort	Luke Jacobs (c) defeated Michael Oku to retain the PROGRESS World Championship	
17	West Coast Pro	Vegas Vacation	Paradise, Nevada	MEET Las Vegas	1 Called Manders and Thomas Shire defeated The Crush Boys (Titus Alexander and Starboy Charlie) (c) to win the West Coast Pro Tag Team Championship	
17	Prestige	Nothing to Lose	Paradise, Nevada	MEET Las Vegas	Alan Angels (c) defeated Calvin Tankman in a No Disqualification match to retain the Prestige World Championship	
17	TNA	Unbreakable	Paradise, Nevada	Cox Pavilion	Steve Maclin defeated A. J. Francis and Eric Young in a tournament final to become the inaugural TNA International Champion	
17	Stardom	American Dream	Paradise, Nevada	Silverton	Maika defeated Thekla	
18	Stardom	American Dream	Paradise, Nevada	MEET Las Vegas	Hai High Mate (Hanako and Maika) and Megan Bayne defeated H.A.T.E. (Momo Watanabe and Konami) and Kalientita	
18	CF: TJPW	LIVE in Las Vegas	Paradise, Nevada	Palms Casino Resort	Mizuki (c) defeated Miyu Yamashita to retain the Princess of Princess Championship	
18	CF: DDT	DDT Goes Las Vegas	Paradise, Nevada	Palms Casino Resort	Konosuke Takeshita defeated Mao	
18	GCW	Joey Janela's Spring Break 9	Paradise, Nevada	Palms Casino Resort	Sabu defeated Joey Janela in a No Rope Barbed Wire match	Featured the retirement match of Sabu.
18	GCW; 4th Rope	Heels Have Eyes: Four the Culture	Paradise, Nevada	Palms Casino Resort	Zilla Fatu (c) defeated Josh Bishop in a Steel Cage match to retain the 4th Rope Heavyweight Championship	
18	DPW	Title Fight in Vegas	Paradise, Nevada	MEET Las Vegas	Adam Priest won the Ultimate Conflict match by last eliminating Calvin Tankman to win the vacant DPW Worlds Championship	Aired on tape delay on April 23.
18	DGUSA; PWR	The Gate of Revolution	Paradise, Nevada	MEET Las Vegas	Ben-K, Hyo, and Kzy defeated Z-Brats (Kota Minoura, Shun Skywalker, and Ishin)	
19	GCW	Effy's Big Gay Brunch 10	Paradise, Nevada	Palms Casino Resort	Effy (c) defeated Dark Sheik to retain the GCW World Championship	
19	GCW	Joey Janela's Spring Break: Clusterfuck Forever	Paradise, Nevada	Palms Casino Resort	Brodie Lee Jr. won the Clusterfuck Battle Royal by last eliminating Joey Janela	
19	GCW; CF: TJPW; DDT	TJPW vs. DDT vs. GCW	Paradise, Nevada	Palms Casino Resort	Mao and Yoshihiko (c) defeated Alec Price and Jimmy Lloyd, and Jack Cartwheel and Kazuma Sumi to retain the BZW Tag Team Championship	
19	WWE: NXT	Stand & Deliver	Paradise, Nevada	T-Mobile Arena	Oba Femi (c) defeated Trick Williams and Je'Von Evans to retain the NXT Championship	
19	WWE: Raw; SmackDown	WrestleMania 41	Paradise, Nevada	Allegiant Stadium	Seth Rollins defeated Roman Reigns and CM Punk	
20	WWE: Raw; SmackDown	WrestleMania 41	Paradise, Nevada	Allegiant Stadium	John Cena defeated Cody Rhodes (c) to win the Undisputed WWE Championship	
20	RevPro	High Stakes	Doncaster, England	Doncaster Dome	Mercedes Moné (c) defeated Kanji to retain the Undisputed British Women's Championship	
23	AEW	Playoff Palooza	New Orleans, Louisiana	Lakefront Arena	FTR (Cash Wheeler and Dax Harwood) defeated The Paragon (Roderick Strong and Kyle O'Reilly)	Aired on tape delay on April 26 as a special episode of Collision.
24	DPW	Spirit Rising	Tokyo, Japan	Shinjuku FACE	Dani Luna (c) defeated Rika Tatsumi to retain the DPW Women's Worlds Championship	Aired on tape delay on May 10.
25	DPW	Spirit Rising	Tokyo, Japan	Shin-Kiba 1st Ring	LaBron Kozone (c) defeated Takuya Nomura to retain the DPW National Championship	Aired on tape delay on May 11.
25	HOG	Isolation	New York City, New York	NYC Arena	Mike Santana (c) vs. Konosuke Takeshita for the HOG Heavyweight Championship ended in a no contest	
26	NJPW	Wrestling Redzone	Hiroshima, Japan	Hiroshima Sun Plaza	United Empire (Great-O-Khan and Callum Newman) defeated Bishamon (Hirooki Goto and Yoshi-Hashi) to win the vacant IWGP Tag Team Championship	
27	TNA	Rebellion	Los Angeles, California	Galen Center	Joe Hendry (c) defeated Frankie Kazarian and Ethan Page to retain the TNA World Championship	
27	Stardom	All Star Grand Queendom	Yokohama, Japan	Yokohama Arena	Saya Kamitani (c) defeated Tam Nakano in a Career vs. Career match to retain the World of Stardom Championship	
29	NJPW	Hizen no Kuni	Saga, Japan	Saga Arena	El Desperado (c) defeated Templario to retain the IWGP Junior Heavyweight Championship	
(c) – denotes defending champion(s)

=== May ===
Date	Promotion(s)	Event	Location	Venue	Main Event	Notes
2	CMLL; MLW	CMLL vs. MLW	Mexico City, Mexico	Arena Mexico	Místico defeated Kushida	
3	CF: Noah	Memorial Voyage in Kokugikan	Tokyo, Japan	Ryogoku Kokugikan	Ozawa (c) defeated Kenta to retain the GHC Heavyweight Championship	
3	GCW	Crazy Scary Spooky Hilarious	Los Angeles, California	Ukrainian Culture Center	Matt Tremont (c) defeated Arez to retain the GCW Ultraviolent Championship	
3	NJPW	Wrestling Dontaku	Fukuoka, Japan	Fukuoka Kokusai Center	Bullet Club War Dogs (David Finlay, Clark Connors, Drilla Moloney, Gabe Kidd, and Taiji Ishimori) defeated House of Torture (Evil, Ren Narita, Sanada, Sho, and Yoshinobu Kanemaru) in a Dog Pound match	
4	NJPW	Wrestling Dontaku	Fukuoka, Japan	Fukuoka Kokusai Center	Hirooki Goto (c) defeated Callum Newman to retain the IWGP World Heavyweight Championship	
4	GWF	World Cup	Berlin, Germany	Festsaal Kreuzberg	Axel Tischer defeated Aytaç Bahar, Erkan Sulacni, and Robbie X in the final of the World Cup	
4	GCW	We Still Don't Trust You	Portland, Oregon	Hawthorne Theatre	Matt Tremont (c) defeated Jimmy Lloyd to retain the GCW Ultraviolent Championship	
4	Progress	Super Strong Style 16	London, England	Electric Ballroom	Rhio defeated Nina Samuels (c) in a Title vs. PROGRESS Career match to win the PROGRESS Women's Championship	
5	Progress	Super Strong Style 16	London, England	Electric Ballroom	Man Like DeReiss defeated Leon Slater in the final of the Super Strong Style 16 tournament	
9	Stardom	New Blood 21	Tokyo, Japan	Shin-Kiba 1st Ring	God's Eye (Hina, Tomoka Inaba, and Nanami) defeated H.A.T.E. (Rina, Azusa Inaba, and Fukigen Death)	
9	NJPW	Resurgence	Ontario, California	Toyota Arena	Hirooki Goto (c) vs. Zack Sabre Jr. for the IWGP World Heavyweight Championship ended in a double pinfall draw	
9	NJPW	Resurgence	Ontario, California	Toyota Arena	AZM defeated Mercedes Moné (c) and Mina Shirakawa to win the Strong Women's Championship	
9	HOG	Waging War	Chicago, Illinois	Logan Square Auditorium	Mike Santana (c) defeated Cedric Alexander to retain the HOG Heavyweight Championship	
10	WWE: Raw; SmackDown	Backlash	St. Louis, Missouri	Enterprise Center	John Cena (c) defeated Randy Orton to retain the Undisputed WWE Championship	
10	MLW; CMLL	Azteca Lucha	Cicero, Illinois	Cicero Stadium	Místico defeated Templario and Ikuro Kwon	
10	MLW	War Chamber	Cicero, Illinois	Cicero Stadium	The Bomaye Fight Club (Alex Kane and Mr. Thomas), Matthew Justice, and Paul London defeated The Rogue Horsemen (Bobby Fish, Brett Ryan Gosselin, Brock Anderson, and C. W. Anderson) in a War Chamber match	Aired on tape delay on June 7.
10	MLP	Northern Rising	Toronto, Ontario, Canada	Mattamy Athletic Centre	Josh Alexander won the 20-man Gauntlet match by last eliminating Matt Cardona to become the inaugural MLP Canadian Champion	
11	JCW	May Flowers	Asbury Park, New Jersey	House of Independents	Masha Slamovich (c) defeated Timothy Thatcher to retain the JCW World Championship	
14	AEW	Beach Break	Hoffman Estates, Illinois	Now Arena	Jon Moxley (c) defeated Samoa Joe in a Steel Cage match to retain the AEW World Championship	Aired as a special episode of Dynamite.
14	AEW	Beach Break	Hoffman Estates, Illinois	Now Arena	Powerhouse Hobbs defeated Wheeler Yuta	Aired on tape delay on May 17 as a special episode of Collision.
16	DEFY	Fatal Fantasy	Seattle, Washington	Washington Hall	Minoru Suzuki defeated Joey Janela	
17	NWA	Crockett Cup	Philadelphia, Pennsylvania	2300 Arena	The Immortals (Kratos and Odinson) defeated The Colóns (Eddie Colón and Orlando Colón) in the Crockett Cup final	Taping for Powerrr.
17	GCW	Live in Maryland: Big Time	Joppa, Maryland	RJ Meyer Arena	Effy (c) defeated Ruckus to retain the GCW World Championship	
18	CF: Noah	Star Navigation; Night 1	Tokyo, Japan	Korakuen Hall	Ozawa (c) defeated Kaito Kiyomiya to retain the GHC Heavyweight Championship	
18	GCW	Run For It	Rochester, New York	Water Street Music Hall	Matt Tremont (c) defeated Mance Warner to retain the GCW Ultraviolent Championship	
18	DPW	Limit Break	Durham, North Carolina	Durham Armory	Adam Priest and Trevor Lee defeated LaBron Kozone and Colby Corino	Aired on tape delay on May 25.
18	REVOLVER	Let Us Cook	Dayton, Ohio	Calumet Center	Myron Reed (c) defeated BDE in a Dayton Street Fight to retain the REVOLVER World Championship	
23	Independent	Hana Kimura Memorial Show 5	Tokyo, Japan	Korakuen Hall	Veny defeated Rina	
23	TNA	Under Siege	Brampton, Ontario, Canada	CAA Centre	Joe Hendry and Elijah defeated Trick Williams and Frankie Kazarian	
24	Marigold	Shine Forever	Tokyo, Japan	Yoyogi National Gymnasium	Miku Aono defeated Nanae Takahashi	Featured Nanae Takahashi's retirement match.
24	WWE: Raw; SmackDown	Saturday Night's Main Event XXXIX	Tampa, Florida	Yuengling Center	Jey Uso (c) defeated Logan Paul to retain the World Heavyweight Championship	
25	WWE: NXT	Battleground	Tampa, Florida	Yuengling Center	Trick Williams defeated Joe Hendry (c) to win the TNA World Championship	
25	AEW	Double or Nothing	Glendale, Arizona	Desert Diamond Arena	"Hangman" Adam Page defeated Will Ospreay in the final of the 2025 Men's Owen Hart Foundation Cup Tournament	
25	TNA	Border Brawl	Niagara Falls, Ontario	Niagara Falls Convention Centre	Matt Hardy, Tommy Dreamer, Jody Threat, Cody Deaner, and Santino Marella defeated The System (Moose, Eddie Edwards, Alisha Edwards, Brian Myers, and JDC)	Co-produced with Zone.ify
31	REVOLVER	Unreal	Richmond, Indiana	Wayne County Fairgrounds	Myron Reed (c) vs. Dante Leon for the REVOLVER World Championship ended in a no contest	
(c) – denotes defending champion(s)

=== June ===
Date	Promotion(s)	Event	Location	Venue	Main Event	Notes
1	GWF	Rising Heat	Berlin, Germany	Astra Kulturhaus	Axel Tischer defeated Metehan (c) and Erkan Sulcani to win the GWF World Championship	
1	NJPW	Best of the Super Juniors (Final)	Tokyo, Japan	Ota City General Gymnasium	Kosei Fujita defeated Yoh to win the Best of the Super Juniors final	
1	West Coast Pro; DPW; Prestige	Unit3d	Los Angeles, California	Vermont Hollywood	The Cowboy Way (1 Called Manders and Thomas Shire) (c) defeated Sinner and Saint (Judas Icarus and Travis Williams) to retain the West Coast Pro Tag Team Championship	
3	CF: Noah	Star Navigation; Night 2	Tokyo, Japan	Korakuen Hall	Ozawa (c) defeated Tetsuya Endo and Takashi Sugiura to retain the GHC Heavyweight Championship	
4	Stardom	New Blood 22	Tokyo, Japan	Tokyo Square in Itabashi	Rice or Bread (Waka Tsukiyama and Hanako) (c) defeated Himiko and Yuma Makoto to retain the New Blood Tag Team Championship	
4	AEW	Fyter Fest	Denver, Colorado	Mission Ballroom	Kenny Omega (c) defeated Brody King, Claudio Castagnoli, and Máscara Dorada to retain the AEW International Championship	Aired as a special episode of Dynamite.
4	AEW	Fyter Fest	Denver, Colorado	Mission Ballroom	Paragon (Adam Cole, Kyle O'Reilly, and Roderick Strong) and Daniel Garcia defeated The Don Callis Family (Josh Alexander, Lance Archer, Trent Beretta, and Rocky Romero)	Aired immediately after Dynamite as a special episode of Collision.
6	TNA	Against All Odds	Tempe, Arizona	Mullett Arena	Trick Williams (c) defeated Elijah to retain the TNA World Championship	
7	HOG	Mike Santana Presents Puerto Rican Weekend	New York City, New York	NYC Arena	Charles Mason defeated Mike Santana (c) and Tomohiro Ishii to win the HOG Heavyweight Championship	Featured Mike Santana's final match in House of Glory
7	AAA; WWE: Raw; SmackDown; NXT	Worlds Collide	Inglewood, California	Kia Forum	El Hijo del Vikingo (c) defeated Chad Gable to retain the AAA Mega Championship	First Worlds Collide event since 2022, and first WWE event to feature AAA wrestlers since 1997 after WWE acquired the company in April.
7	WWE: Raw; SmackDown	Money in the Bank	Inglewood, California	Intuit Dome	Cody Rhodes and Jey Uso defeated John Cena and Logan Paul	
7	GCW	Tournament of Survival X	Atlantic City, New Jersey	Showboat Resort Atlantic City	Matt Tremont (c) defeated Otis Cogar in a Concrete Hell Deathmatch in the final of the Tournament of Survival X to retain the GCW Ultraviolent Championship	
8	GCW	Cage of Survival 4	Atlantic City, New Jersey	Showboat Resort Atlantic City	Ciclope defeated Miedo Extremo in a Cage of Survival match	
11	AEW	Summer Blockbuster	Portland, Oregon	Theater of the Clouds at Moda Center	TayJay (Tay Melo and Anna Jay) defeated Megan Bayne and Penelope Ford	Aired as a special episode of Dynamite.
11	AEW	Summer Blockbuster	Portland, Oregon	Theater of the Clouds at Moda Center	The Don Callis Family (Konosuke Takeshita, Josh Alexander, Lance Archer, and Hechicero) defeated Daniel Garcia and Paragon (Adam Cole, Kyle O'Reilly, and Roderick Strong)	Aired immediately after Dynamite as a special episode of Collision.
12	JCW	Recs . sports . pro . wrestling	Ridgefield Park, New Jersey	Ridgefield Park Knights of Columbus	Beastman and Mad Dog Connelly defeated Bam Sullivan and Matt Tremont	
13	DEFY	Vortex	Seattle, Washington	Washington Hall	Sinner & Saint (Judas Icarus and Travis Williams) (c) defeated C4 (Cody Chhun and Guillermo Rosas) by 2–1 in a two out of three falls match to retain the DEFY Tag Team Championship	
14	RevPro	British J-Cup	Stevenage, England	Gordon Craig Theatre	Nino Bryant defeated Adam Priest, Cameron Khai, and Chris Ridgeway in a four-way elimination match in the British J-Cup tournament finals	
14	REVOLVER	Cage of Horrors 4	Clive, Iowa	Horizon Events Center	Rich Swann defeated Matthew Palmer in a Cage of Horrors match	
15	AAA	Triplemanía Regia III	Monterrey, Mexico	Arena Monterrey	El Hijo del Vikingo (c) defeated Alberto El Patrón in a Steel Cage match to retain the AAA Mega Championship	
15	NJPW	Dominion 6.15 in Osaka-jo Hall	Osaka, Japan	Osaka-jo Hall	Hirooki Goto (c) defeated Shingo Takagi to retain the IWGP World Heavyweight Championship	
15	DPW	Victory Lap	Raleigh, North Carolina	C3 at The Venue	Adam Priest (c) defeated Calvin Tankman to retain the DPW Worlds Championship	Aired on tape delay on June 22.
17	AEW; ROH; CMLL	CMLL vs. AEW & ROH	Mexico City, Mexico	Arena Mexico	Bandido (c) defeated Máscara Dorada to retain the ROH World Championship	
18	AEW; CMLL	Grand Slam Mexico	Mexico City, Mexico	Arena Mexico	The Beast Mortos, Death Riders (Jon Moxley and Wheeler Yuta), and The Young Bucks (Matthew Jackson and Nicholas Jackson) defeated The Opps (Samoa Joe, Powerhouse Hobbs, and Katsuyori Shibata), Swerve Strickland, and Will Ospreay	Aired as a special 2.5-hour episode of Dynamite. AEW's first event in Mexico.
18	CMLL; ROH	Global Wars Mexico	Mexico City, Mexico	Arena Mexico	Blue Panther defeated Lee Moriarty	
20	GCW	Bangin' in Little Rock	Little Rock, Arkansas	Little Rock Hall	Atticus Cogar defeated Shotzi Blackheart	
20	CMLL; NJPW	Fantastica Mania Mexico	Mexico City, Mexico	Arena Mexico	Bandido and Hologram defeated El Sky Team (Místico and Máscara Dorada)	
21	Stardom	The Conversion	Tokyo, Japan	Yoyogi National Gymnasium	Sareee defeated Syuri (c) to win the IWGP Women's Championship	
22	RevPro	Revolution Rumble	London, England	York Hall	Sha Samuels won the 30-man Revolution Rumble match	
22	GCW	Take a Picture	Kansas City, Missouri	The Truman	Masha Slamovich (c) defeated Mickie Knuckles to retain the JCW World Championship	
24	NJPW	Death Pain Invitational	Tokyo, Japan	Korakuen Hall	El Desperado (c) defeated Jun Kasai in a Lighttubes Glass Board Barbed Wire Deathmatch to retain the IWGP Junior Heavyweight Championship	
24	1FW	SummerStage	Atlanta, Georgia	Center Stage Theater	Brady Booker defeated Elijah Drago (c) in a Steel cage match to retain the 1FW Heavyweight Championship	
26	MLW	Summer of the Beasts	Queens, New York	Melrose Ballroom	Matt Riddle (c) defeated Kenta to retain the MLW World Heavyweight Championship	
26	MLW	Blood and Thunder	Queens, New York	Melrose Ballroom	Satoshi Kojima defeated Bobby Fish in an Opera Cup first round match	Airing on tape delay on August 9.
28	REVOLVER	Texas Title Tournament	Bedford, Texas	MPX Event Center	Brick Savage defeated JD Griffey in a tournament final to become the inaugural Revolver Texas Champion	
28	WWE: Raw; SmackDown	Night of Champions	Riyadh, Saudi Arabia	Kingdom Arena	John Cena (c) defeated CM Punk to retain the Undisputed WWE Championship	
29	CF: DDT	King of Kings	Tokyo, Japan	Korakuen Hall	Kazusada Higuchi defeated Chris Brookes (c) to win the KO-D Openweight Championship	
29	NJPW	Tanahashi Jam	Nagoya, Japan	Aichi Prefectural Gymnasium	Hiroshi Tanahashi and Naomichi Marufuji defeated Kaito Kiyomiya and Ryohei Oiwa	Aired as a special event on TV Asahi.
29	Progress	Chapter 181: Far From Ordinary People	Manchester, England	The O_{2} Ritz	Luke Jacobs (c) defeated Cara Noir to retain the PROGRESS World Championship	
(c) – denotes defending champion(s)

=== July ===
Date	Promotion(s)	Event	Location	Venue	Main Event	Notes
2	AEW	Dynamite 300	Ontario, California	Toyota Arena	Kazuchika Okada defeated Kota Ibushi	Celebrated the 300th episode of Dynamite.
2	AEW	Collision 100	Ontario, California	Toyota Arena	Kyle Fletcher defeated Daniel Garcia to become the #1 contender for the AEW TNT Championship at All In	Aired on tape delay on July 5. Celebrated the 100th episode of Collision.
4	Stardom	New Blood 23	Tokyo, Japan	Tokyo Square in Itabashi	Rice or Bread (Waka Tsukiyama and Hanako) (c) defeated Peach & Lily (Momo Kohgo and Yuria Hime) to retain the New Blood Tag Team Championship	
4	GCW	Backyard Wrestling 7	West Creek, New Jersey	N/A	Lil Skittle defeated Mister Jay in a No Ropes Barbed Wire Deathmatch	
5	GCW	The Top Play	Hartford, Connecticut	Webster Theater	Matt Tremont (c) defeated UltraMantis Black in a Deathmatch to retain the GCW Ultraviolent Championship	
5	MLP	Resurrection	Laval, Quebec, Canada	Colisée de Laval	PCO (c) defeated Dan Maff in a House of Pain match with Billy Gunn as the special guest referee to retain the Canadian International Heavyweight Championship	
5	Sukeban	Sukeban Anime Expo 2025	Los Angeles, California, USA	Los Angeles Convention Center	Sareee Bomb (c) defeats Maya Mamushi to retain the Sukeban World Title	last appearance of Sareee Bomb after 2026 She was released by Sukeban.
6	GWF	Summer Smash 10	Berlin, Germany	Festsaal Kreuzberg	Axel Tischer (c) defeated Erkan Sulcani to retain the GWF World Championship	
6	JCW	Born (Almost) on The Fourth of July	Asbury Park, New Jersey	House of Independents	Matt Tremont (c) defeated Mad Dog Connelly in a Dog Collar match to retain the GCW Ultraviolent Championship	
9	REVOLVER	Roulette	Dayton, Ohio	Calumet Center	Myron Reed (c) defeated Jake Crist, Dante Leon, and Façade in a four-way street fight to retain the REVOLVER World Championship	Aired on tape delay on July 10.
10	CF: TJPW	Live in Texas	Houston, Texas	POST	Hyper Misao and Shoko Nakajima defeated Mizuki and Pom Harajuku	
11	CF: TJPW	Live in Texas	Houston, Texas	POST	Yuki Arai and Moka Miyamoto defeated Mizuki and Suzume	
11	AAA	Verano de Escándalo	Aguascalientes, Mexico	Arena San Marcos	Alberto El Patrón and El Mesías defeated El Hijo del Vikingo and King Vikingo	
11	GCW	Boss of All Bosses	Dallas, Texas	Gilley's Dallas	Effy (c) defeated Atticus Cogar to retain the GCW World Championship	
11	HOG	Texas	Haltom City, Texas	Haltom Theater	Zilla Fatu (Crown Jewel) defeated Charles Mason (Heavyweight) by disqualification in a Winner Takes All match to retain the HOG Crown Jewel Championship but did not win the HOG Heavyweight Championship	First HOG event in Texas.
11	ROH	Supercard of Honor	Arlington, Texas	Esports Stadium Arlington	Bandido (c) defeated Konosuke Takeshita to retain the ROH World Championship	
12	AEW	All In: Texas	Arlington, Texas	Globe Life Field	"Hangman" Adam Page defeated Jon Moxley (c) in a Texas Deathmatch to win the AEW World Championship	Featured the returns of Juice Robinson, The Gunns (Austin Gunn and Colten Gunn), Cope, Bryan Danielson, and Darby Allin.
12	WWE: NXT	The Great American Bash	Atlanta, Georgia	Center Stage	Jordynne Grace and Blake Monroe defeated Fatal Influence (Jacy Jayne and Fallon Henley)	
12	WWE: Raw; SmackDown	Saturday Night's Main Event XL	Atlanta, Georgia	State Farm Arena	Gunther (c) defeated Goldberg to retain the World Heavyweight Championship	Featured Goldberg's retirement match.
13	WWE: Raw; SmackDown; NXT	Evolution	Atlanta, Georgia	State Farm Arena	Naomi defeated Iyo Sky (c) and Rhea Ripley in Naomi's Money in the Bank cash-in match to win the Women's World Championship (Note: This was originally a singles match between Iyo Sky and Rhea Ripley, but converted into a triple threat match after Naomi cashed-in her contract mid-match.)	First Evolution event since 2018.
13	DPW	Tag Festival	Durham, North Carolina	Durham Armory	Miracle Generation (Dustin Waller and Kylon King) defeated Grizzled Young Veterans (James Drake and Zack Gibson) (c), The Beast Mortos and Jake Something, and The Workhorsemen (JD Drake and Anthony Henry) in the Tag Festival tournament final Four-way tag team elimination match to win the DPW Worlds Tag Team Championship	Aired on tape delay on July 20.
16	Marigold	Burning Desire	Tokyo, Japan	Korakuen Hall	Utami Hayashishita (Marigold) vs. Takumi Iroha (GHC) in a Winner Takes All match for the Marigold World Championship and GHC Women's Championship ended in a double knockout	
17	GCW; JCW	Showcase Showdown: The Violence is Right	Detroit, Michigan	Majestic Theatre	Matt Tremont defeated Mad Man Pondo (c) in a Deathmatch to win the JCW Heavyweight Championship	
19	GCW	Bash at The Ballpark	New York City, New York	Maimonides Park	Effy (c) defeated Charles Mason to retain the GCW World Championship	
19	CF: Noah	New Departure	Tokyo, Japan	Korakuen Hall	Kenoh defeated Ozawa (c) to win the GHC Heavyweight Championship	
20	CF: Noah	New Departure	Tokyo, Japan	Korakuen Hall	Kenta defeated Kenoh (c) to win the GHC Heavyweight Championship	
20	TNA	Slammiversary	Elmont, New York	UBS Arena	Trick Williams (c) defeated Joe Hendry and Mike Santana to retain the TNA World Championship	Featured the TNA return of AJ Styles.
21	Stardom	Sapporo World Rendezvous	Sapporo, Japan	Chateraise Gateaux Kingdom Sapporo	Saya Kamitani (c) defeated Natsupoi to retain the World of Stardom Championship	
21	CF: TJPW	Summer Princess	Tokyo, Japan	Ota City General Gymnasium	Mizuki (c) defeated Yuki Arai to retain the Princess of Princess Championship	
25	RevPro	Summer Sizzler	Wolverhampton, England	The Hangar	Mercedes Moné (c) defeated Safire Reed to retain the Undisputed British Women's Championship	
26	West Coast Pro; DPW; Prestige	Cruel Summer	San Francisco, California	United Irish Cultural Center	Kevin Blackwood (c) defeated Cedric Alexander by 2–1 in a two-out-of-three falls match to retain the West Coast Pro Heavyweight Championship	
26	MLP	Downtown Showdown	Windsor, Ontario, Canada	Intersection of Ouellette Avenue and University Avenue	The Good Brothers (Doc Gallows and Karl Anderson) defeated Bryce Hansen and Sheldon Jean	
27	Progress	Chapter 182: Stay Humble	London, England	Electric Ballroom	Rhio (c) vs. Kanji vs. Rayne Leverkusen for the Progress World Women's Championship ended in a draw	
28	GCW	Tokyo Terminal	Tokyo, Japan	Shinjuku FACE	Matt Tremont (c) defeated Super Crazy to retain the GCW Ultraviolent Championship	
29	GCW	Shattered Square	Tokyo, Japan	Tokyo Square in Itabashi	Matt Tremont (c) defeated Masashi Takeda to retain the GCW Ultraviolent Championship	
30	GCW	King of Korakuen	Tokyo, Japan	Korakuen Hall	Effy (c) defeated Matt Tremont to retain the GCW World Championship	
(c) – denotes defending champion(s)

=== August ===
Date	Promotion(s)	Event	Location	Venue	Main Event	Notes
1	HOG	High Intensity	New York City, New York	NYC Arena	Bully Ray defeated Zilla Fatu (c) in a Tables match to win the HOG Crown Jewel Championship	
1	JCW	Powder Keg	Rutherford, New Jersey	Williams Center	Team GCW (1 Called Manders, John Wayne Murdoch, and Matt Tremont) vs. Team JCW Hall of Famers (2 Tuff Tony, Mad Man Pondo, and Mickie Knuckles) ended in a no contest	
1	GCW	ID Showcase	Rutherford, New Jersey	Williams Center	Cappuccino Jones defeated Jack Cartwheel in a tournament final to become the inaugural WWE ID Champion	Also featured the crowning of the inaugural WWE Women's ID Champion.
1	GCW	Hit 'Em Up	Rutherford, New Jersey	Williams Center	Bear Bronson and Slade defeated Dr. Danger and Dr. Redacted in a Deathmatch	
2	GCW	Josh Barnett's Bloodsport XIV	Rutherford, New Jersey	Williams Center	Nattie Neidhart defeated Masha Slamovich by referee stoppage	
2	GCW	Emo Fight	Rutherford, New Jersey	Williams Center	Zachary Wentz defeated Bryan Keith	
2	WWE: Raw; SmackDown	SummerSlam	East Rutherford, New Jersey	MetLife Stadium	Seth Rollins defeated CM Punk (c) in Rollins's Money in the Bank cash-in match to win the World Heavyweight Championship	
3	WWE: Raw; SmackDown	SummerSlam	East Rutherford, New Jersey	MetLife Stadium	Cody Rhodes defeated John Cena in a Street Fight to win the Undisputed WWE Championship	Featured the return of Brock Lesnar.
3	JCW	High Noon	Ridgefield Park, New Jersey	Ridgefield Park Knights of Columbus	Drew Parker and YDNP (Alec Price and Jordan Oliver) defeated Darian Bengston and JetSpeed (Kevin Knight and "Speedball" Mike Bailey)	
8	DPW	Showdown in Cary	Cary, North Carolina	SportHQ	Adam Priest (c) defeated Anthony Henry to retain the DPW Worlds Championship	Aired on tape delay on August 17.
9	REVOLVER	Jerry Lynn Invitational Tournament	Dayton, Ohio	Calumet Center	Krule defeated Dick Meyers in a Street Fight	
9	REVOLVER	Jerry Lynn Invitational Tournament	Dayton, Ohio	Calumet Center	Rich Swann defeated Alan Angels in the Jerry Lynn Invitational tournament final	
9	GWF; RevPro	Double Impact	Berlin, Germany	Festsaal Kreuzberg	Michael Oku defeated Metehan	
10	GWF; RevPro	Double Impact	Berlin, Germany	Festsaal Kreuzberg	Axel Tischer (c) defeated Mike D Vecchio to retain the GWF World Championship	
10	DPW	Beast Coast	Jersey City, New Jersey	White Eagle Hall	Adam Priest (c) defeated Jake Something to retain the DPW Worlds Championship	Aired on tape delay on August 23.
12	JCW	Gathering of the Juggalos	Thornville, Ohio	Legend Valley	Willie Mack defeated Marcus Mathers	Aired as a special live episode of JCW Lunacy
14	GCW; JCW	JCW vs. GCW: The 2 Day War	Thornville, Ohio	Legend Valley	YDNP (Alec Price and Jordan Oliver) (GCW) defeated The Brothers of Funstruction (Yabo the Clown and Ruffo the Clown) (JCW) in a Winners Take All match for the GCW World Tag Team Championship and JCW Tag Team Championship	
15	GCW; JCW	JCW vs. GCW: The 2 Day War	Thornville, Ohio	Legend Valley	2 Tuff Tony defeated Matt Tremont (c) in an Exploding Barbed Wire Deathmatch to win the JCW Heavyweight Championship	
15	TNA	Emergence	Baltimore, Maryland	Chesapeake Employers Insurance Arena	Trick Williams (c) defeated Moose to retain the TNA World Championship	
16	AAA	Triplemanía XXXIII	Mexico City, Mexico	Arena CDMX	El Hijo del Vikingo (c) defeated Dragon Lee, El Grande Americano, and Dominik Mysterio to retain the AAA Mega Championship	
16	NWA	NWA 77th Anniversary Show	Huntington, New York	The Paramount	"Thrillbilly" Silas Mason defeated Thom Latimer (c) to win the NWA Worlds Heavyweight Championship	Taping for Powerrr.
17	NJPW	G1 Climax 35 (Final)	Tokyo, Japan	Ariake Arena	Konosuke Takeshita defeated Evil in the G1 Climax 35 tournament final	
22	RevPro; NJPW; ROH; CMLL	13th Anniversary Show; Night 1: Global Wars UK	London, England	Crystal Palace National Sports Centre	Hiroshi Tanahashi, Katsuyori Shibata, Michael Oku, "Speedball" Mike Bailey, and Zozaya defeated Robbie X, The Cowboy Way (1 Called Manders and Thomas Shire), and The Don Callis Family (Kyle Fletcher and Hechicero)	
23	RevPro	13th Anniversary Show; Night 2	London, England	Crystal Palace National Sports Centre	Sha Samuels defeated Ricky Knight Jr. (c) in a Title vs. Career match to win the Undisputed British Heavyweight Championship	
23	Stardom	5 Star Grand Prix (Final)	Tokyo, Japan	Ota City General Gymnasium	Momo Watanabe defeated AZM in the 5 Star Grand Prix tournament final	
23	GCW	Homecoming Weekend	Atlantic City, New Jersey	Showboat Resort Atlantic City	Masashi Takeda defeated Slade in a Deathmatch	
24	GCW	Homecoming Weekend	Atlantic City, New Jersey	Showboat Resort Atlantic City	Matt Tremont (c) defeated Bear Bronson in a Deathmatch to retain the GCW Ultraviolent Championship	
24	Prestige	Shark Ethic	Portland, Oregon	Morrison Market Stage 722	Judas Icarus (c) defeated Titus Alexander to retain the Prestige Championship	Aired on tape delay on September 12.
24	WWE: NXT	Heatwave	Lowell, Massachusetts	Lowell Memorial Auditorium	Oba Femi (c) defeated Je'Von Evans to retain the NXT Championship	
24	AEW; NJPW	Forbidden Door	London, England	O2 Arena	Darby Allin, Will Ospreay, Hiroshi Tanahashi, and Golden☆Lovers (Kenny Omega and Kota Ibushi) defeated Gabe Kidd, Death Riders (Jon Moxley and Claudio Castagnoli), and The Young Bucks (Matt Jackson and Nick Jackson) in a Lights Out Steel Cage match	First Forbidden Door not held in June and first to be held outside North America. Featured Hiroshi Tanahashi's final match in the United Kingdom. Also featured the return of Wardlow.
25	Progress	Chapter 183: Hundred Volts	London, England	Electric Ballroom	Man Like DeReiss defeated Luke Jacobs (c) in a Tables, Ladders and Chairs match to win the PROGRESS World Championship	
29	CMLL	Gran Prix Internacional	Mexico City, Mexico	Arena Mexico	Team Mexico (Místico, Volador Jr., Máscara Dorada, Neón, Atlantis Jr., Templario, Titán, Ángel de Oro, Zandokan Jr., and Difunto) defeated Team International (Donovan Dijak, Taiji Ishimori, Michael Oku, Robbie X, Rocky Romero, Lio Rush, Action Andretti, "Speedball" Mike Bailey, and TJP) in a Grand Prix Internacional Torneo Cibernético match	
29	ROH	Death Before Dishonor	Philadelphia, Pennsylvania	2300 Arena	Athena (c) defeated Mina Shirakawa to retain the ROH World Championship	
30	CF: DDT	Wrestle Peter Pan	Tokyo, Japan	Tokyo Higashin Arena	Kazusada Higuchi (c) defeated Jun Akiyama to retain the KO-D Openweight Championship	First two-night Peter Pan
31	CF: DDT	Wrestle Peter Pan	Tokyo, Japan	Korakuen Hall	Kazuki Hirata defeated Yuki Ueno (c) in Hirata's Right to Challenge Anytime Anywhere cash-in match to win the KO-D Openweight Championship	First two-night Peter Pan
31	WWE: Raw; SmackDown	Clash in Paris	La Défense, Nanterre, France	Paris La Défense Arena	Seth Rollins (c) defeated CM Punk, LA Knight, and Jey Uso to retain World Heavyweight Championship	Final WWE main roster pay-per-view and livestreaming event to air on Peacock in the United States.
(c) – denotes defending champion(s)

=== September ===
Date	Promotion(s)	Event	Location	Venue	Main Event	Notes
4	HOG	Philadelphia	Philadelphia, Pennsylvania	Trinity Center for Urban Life	Cedric Alexander defeated Amazing Red	
6	Stardom	To The World	Yokohama, Japan	Yokohama Budokan	Saya Kamitani (c) defeated Bea Priestley to retain the World of Stardom Championship	
6	REVOLVER	Clean Slate	Clive, Iowa	Horizon Events Center	Myron Reed (c) defeated Steve Maclin to retain the REVOLVER World Championship	
7	GWF	Battlefield	Berlin, Germany	Festsaal Kreuzberg	Metehan and Rambo last eliminated each other simultaneously in the Battlefield match to determine the #1 contender to the GWF World Championship	
7	NJPW	Yuji Nagata Produce Blue Justice XVI	Tōgane, Japan	Togane Arena	Hiroshi Tanahashi defeated Yuji Nagata	
12	NJPW	Pyon!	Tokyo, Japan	Korakuen Hall	Zack Sabre Jr., Ryusuke Taguchi, Tomohiro Ishii, and Taichi defeated Shota Umino, Yuya Uemura, and TMDK (Kosei Fujita and Ryohei Oiwa)	
12	AAA; WWE: Raw; SmackDown; NXT	Worlds Collide: Las Vegas	Paradise, Nevada	Cox Pavilion	Dominik Mysterio defeated El Hijo del Vikingo (c) to win the AAA Mega Championship	
12	GCW	Evil Deeds	Detroit, Michigan	Harpos Concert Theatre	The Rejects (John Wayne Murdoch and Reed Bentley) defeated The Pillars (Malcolm Monroe III and Tommy Vendetta) in a Deathmatch	
13	GCW	Rumble on The River	Indianapolis, Indiana	Celebration Plaza Amphitheater	Matt Tremont and Billie Starkz defeated The Cogar Brothers (Atticus Cogar and Otis Cogar) in a Hardcore match	
13	JCW	Ultra Live Monster 5: Juggalo Island Show	South Padre Island, Texas	Clayton's Beach Bar & Event Venue	2 Tuff Tony and Amazing Maria defeated Luscious Lawrence and Haley J	Aired on tape delay on September 25 as an episode of JCW Lunacy.
13	MLW	Fightland	North Richland Hills, Texas	NYTEX Sports Centre	Mads Krule Krügger defeated Matt Riddle (c) and Donovan Dijak in Krügger's Gravity Gramble cash-in match to win the MLW World Heavyweight Championship	
13	MLW	Fury Road	North Richland Hills, Texas	NYTEX Sports Centre	Austin Aries defeated Kushida in a 2025 Opera Cup tournament first round match	Aired on tape delay on September 27.
14	Marigold	Dream Star Grand Prix (Final)	Tsu, Mie, Japan	Mie Prefectural Cultural Center	Miku Aono defeated Victoria Yuzuki in the Dream Star Grand Prix tournament final	
14	DPW	Carolina Classic	Durham, North Carolina	Durham Armory	Jake Something defeated Calvin Tankman, LaBron Kozone, and Trevor Lee in a four-way elimination Carolina Classic tournament final to earn a future DPW Worlds Championship match	Aired on tape delay on September 21.
15	JCW	Houston Heat	Houston, Texas	White Oak Music Hall	2 Tuff Tony (c) defeated Kongo Kong to retain the JCW Heavyweight Championship	Aired on tape delay on October 9 as an episode of Lunacy.
16	WWE: NXT	Homecoming	Winter Park, Florida	Full Sail University	Rhea Ripley, Stephanie Vaquer, and Lyra Valkyria defeated Fatal Influence (Jacy Jayne, Fallon Henley, and Jazmyn Nyx)	Aired as a special episode of NXT. First NXT episode to be held at Full Sail University since September 30, 2020. Featured the NXT returns of Shayna Baszler, Finn Bálor, Robert Roode, Montez Ford, and Bianca Belair.
17	AEW	September to Remember	London, Ontario, Canada	Canada Life Place	Thekla defeated Queen Aminata in a No Holds Barred match	Aired as a special episode of Dynamite.
17	AEW	September to Remember	London, Ontario, Canada	Canada Life Place	The Don Callis Family (Hechicero and Josh Alexander) defeated Top Flight (Dante Martin and Darius Martin)	Aired as a special one-hour episode of Collision.
18	JCW	2 Tuff Country	Jeffersonville, Indiana	The ArenA	2 Tuff Tony (c) defeated Matt Cardona to retain the JCW Heavyweight Championship	Aired on tape delay on October 30 as an episode of Lunacy.
19	CMLL	CMLL 92nd Anniversary Show	Mexico City, Mexico	Arena Mexico	Esfinge defeated Valiente in a Lucha de Apuestas Mask vs. Mask match	First CMLL event to be livestreamed on an American streaming service and the first to be streamed with English commentary.
19	DEFY	Aeon	Seattle, Washington	Washington Hall	Killer Kross defeated Calvin Tankman to win the Super Heavyweight Cup	
19	GCW	Keep In Touch	Mesa, Arizona	Nile Theater	BearDozer (Bear Bronson and Matt Tremont) defeated Dr. Redacted and Joey Janela	
20	CF: TJPW	Wrestle Princess VI	Tokyo, Japan	Ota City General Gymnasium	Miu Watanabe defeated Mizuki (c) to win the Princess of Princess Championship	
20	GCW	Homecoming: Los Angeles	Los Angeles, California	Ukrainian Cultural Center	Matt Tremont (c) defeated Dr. Redacted in a Deathmatch to retain the GCW Ultraviolent Championship	
20	AEW	All Out	Toronto, Ontario, Canada	Scotiabank Arena	"Hangman" Adam Page (c) defeated Kyle Fletcher to retain the AEW World Championship	First AEW PPV to stream on HBO Max. Featured the returns of Eddie Kingston, Pac, and Jack Perry, and the AEW debut of Beth Copeland.
20	WWE: Raw; SmackDown	Wrestlepalooza	Indianapolis, Indiana	Gainbridge Fieldhouse	Cody Rhodes (c) defeated Drew McIntyre to retain the Undisputed WWE Championship	First Wrestlepalooza since 2000, which was produced by the former Extreme Championship Wrestling. First WWE pay-per-view and livestreaming event to stream on ESPN's direct-to-consumer service. Featuted AJ Lee and Brock Lesnar's first WWE matches since March 29, 2015, and August 5, 2023 respectively.
21	JCW	The Knockout	Asbury Park, New Jersey	House of Independents	Mad Dog Connelly defeated 1 Called Manders in a Lights Out match	
23	CF: Noah	N-1 Victory (Final)	Tokyo, Japan	Korakuen Hall	Masa Kitamiya defeated Jack Morris in the N-1 Victory tournament final	
23	WWE: Evolve	Succession	Orlando, Florida	WWE Performance Center	Kendal Grey defeated Kali Armstrong (c) to win the WWE Evolve Women's Championship	Aired on tape delay on October 15 as a special episode of Evolve, which was the program's first special.
26	TNA	Victory Road	Edmonton, Alberta, Canada	Edmonton Expo Centre	Leon Slater (c) defeated Myron Reed to retain the TNA X Division Championship	
27	REVOLVER	Redemption	Bedford, Texas	MPX Event Center	Jake Crist defeated Sky de Lacrimosa in a Texas Deathmatch	
27	WWE: NXT	No Mercy	Fort Lauderdale, Florida	FTL War Memorial	Ricky Saints defeated Oba Femi (c) to win the NXT Championship	
28	CF: DDT	Dramatic Infinity	Tokyo, Japan	Korakuen Hall	Yuki Ueno (c) defeated Kazuma Sumi to retain the KO-D Openweight Championship	
28	Progress	Chapter 184: Camden Lock Up	London, England	Electric Ballroom	Kanji defeated Nina Samuels in a Loser Leaves Progress match	
28	GCW	Josh Barnett's Bloodsport: London	London, England	Electric Ballroom	Josh Barnett defeated Oli Thompson	
28	NJPW	Destruction in Kobe	Kobe, Japan	Kobe World Memorial Hall	Zack Sabre Jr. (c) defeated Ren Narita to retain the IWGP World Heavyweight Championship	
28	(c) – denotes defending champion(s)					

=== October ===
Date	Promotion(s)	Event	Location	Venue	Main Event	Notes
1	AEW	Dynamite's 6 Year Anniversary	Hollywood, Florida	Hard Rock Live at Seminole Hard Rock Hotel & Casino Hollywood	Darby Allin and Kris Statlander defeated Death Riders (Wheeler Yuta and Marina Shafir)	Aired as a special episode of Dynamite. Featured the AEW return of Andrade El Ídolo.
3	REVOLVER	Tales From The Ring 8	Dayton, Ohio	Calumet Center	Krule defeated Judge Joe Dred and Alex Colon in a Trick or Treat Deathmatch	
4	Stardom	New Blood 24	Tokyo, Japan	Belle Salle Takadanobaba	Ranna Yagami defeated Tae Honma	
4	GCW	The Last Frontier	Anchorage, Alaska	Arctic Rec Center	Effy (c) defeated Chris Wilde to retain the GCW World Championship	GCW's first event in Alaska.
4	MLW	Slaughterhouse	Long Beach, California	Thunder Studios Arena	Místico defeated Último Guerrero in a 2025 Opera Cup quarterfinal match	
4	MLW	Symphony of Horrors	Long Beach, California	Thunder Studios Arena	Místico defeated Austin Aries in a 2025 Opera Cup semifinal match	Aired on tape delay on October 25.
5	NJPW; Stardom; INFIN	Historic X-Over in Guangzhou	Guangzhou, China	66 Livehouse	Cosmic Angels (Natsupoi, Saori Anou, and Sayaka Kurara) defeated H.A.T.E. (Natsuko Tora, Ruaka, and Rina)	First NJPW event in China since 1992.
5	Prestige	Roseland XII	Portland, Oregon	Roseland Theater	Kevin Blackwood defeated Judas Icarus (c) to win the Prestige World Championship	Aired on tape delay on October 14.
7	NJPW	Superhuman Taiji Ishimori Goes Even More Crazy	Tokyo, Japan	Korakuen Hall	Taiji Ishimori defeated Gedo	
7	TNA; WWE: NXT	NXT vs. TNA Showdown	Orlando, Florida	WWE Performance Center	Team TNA (Mike Santana, Frankie Kazarian, Moose, and Leon Slater) defeated Team NXT (Ricky Saints, Trick Williams, Je'Von Evans, and Myles Borne) in a 4-on-4 men's Survivor Series match	Aired as a special episode of NXT. Featured NXT wrestlers and TNA wrestlers in head-to-head competition for promotional supremacy.
7	AEW	Homecoming: Title Tuesday	Jacksonville, Florida	Daily's Place	Orange Cassidy defeated Pac	Aired as a special episode of Dynamite. This was simultaneously the fourth Title Tuesday special and Part 1 of the fifth Homecoming special.
8	AEW	Homecoming	Jacksonville, Florida	Daily's Place	Top Gods (Megan Bayne, Cash Wheeler, and Dax Harwood) defeated Willow Nightingale and JetSpeed ("Speedball" Mike Bailey and Kevin Knight)	Part 2 of the fifth Homecoming. Aired on October 11 as a special episode of Collision.
10	HOG	With Glory Comes Pride	New York City, New York	NYC Arena	Charles Mason (c) defeated Man Like DeReiss in a No Disqualification match to retain the HOG Heavyweight Championship	
11	WWE: Raw; SmackDown	Crown Jewel	Perth, Western Australia, Australia	RAC Arena	Seth Rollins (World Heavyweight Champion) defeated Cody Rhodes (Undisputed WWE Champion) to win the WWE Crown Jewel Championship	First Crown Jewel to not be held in Saudi Arabia.
11	CF: Noah	Wrestle Odyssey	Tokyo, Japan	Ryōgoku Kokugikan	Kenta (c) defeated Masa Kitamiya to retain the GHC Heavyweight Championship	
11	GCW	Fight Club; Night 1: The Art of War Games	Atlantic City, New Jersey	Showboat Resort Atlantic City	Team GCW (Matt Tremont, Effy, Drew Parker, Bam Sullivan, and Mr. Danger) defeated Team JCW (Mad Man Pondo, Willie Mack, 2 Tuff Tony, Shane Mercer, and CoKane) in an Art of WarGames match	
12	GCW	Fight Club; Night 2	Atlantic City, New Jersey	Showboat Resort Atlantic City	Charles Mason, Slade, and Krule defeated VNDL48 (Atticus Cogar, Otis Cogar, and Christian Napier) in a Deathmatch	
12	GWF	Blockbuster 5	Berlin, Germany	Festsaal Kreuzberg	Carlito defeated Fast Time Moodo (c) to win the GWF Berlin Championship	
12	TNA	Bound for Glory	Lowell, Massachusetts	Tsongas Center	Mike Santana defeated Trick Williams (c) to win the TNA World Championship	
13	NJPW	King of Pro-Wrestling	Tokyo, Japan	Ryōgoku Kokugikan	Konosuke Takeshita defeated Zack Sabre Jr. (c) to win the IWGP World Heavyweight Championship	
17	Stardom	New Blood 25	Osaka, Japan	Azalea Taisho Hall	Cosmic Angels (Yuna Mizumori, Aya Sakura, and Sayaka Kurara) defeated Empress Nexus Venus (Waka Tsukiyama, Hanako, and Rian)	
17	NWA	Samhain: Part 3	Atlanta, Georgia	Center Stage	"Thrillbilly" Silas Mason (c) defeated Matt Cardona in a No Disqualification match to retain the NWA Worlds Heavyweight Championship	Taping for Powerrr.
18	AEW	WrestleDream	St. Louis, Missouri	Chaifetz Arena	Darby Allin defeated Jon Moxley in an "I Quit" match	
18	CMLL; RevPro	Fantastica Mania UK: Show 1	Wolverhampton, England	The Hangar	Último Guerrero defeated Sha Samuels	
18	CMLL; RevPro	Fantastica Mania UK: Show 2	Wolverhampton, England	The Hangar	Místico (c) defeated Michael Oku to retain the CMLL World Light Heavyweight Championship	
19	DPW	Super Battle	Charlotte, North Carolina	Grady Cole Center	Adam Priest (c) vs. Jake Something in a Steel Cage match for the DPW Worlds Championship	Airing on tape delay on October 26.
24	GCW	Shotzi Blackheart's House of Horrors	Rochester, New York	Water Street Music Hall	Charles Mason defeated Atticus Cogar in a Casket match	
24	DEFY	Wraith	Portland, Oregon	Wonder Ballroom	Bryan Keith (c) defeated Cody Chuun to retain the DEFY World Championship	
25	AAA	Heroes Inmortales	Mexico City, Mexico	Gimnasio Olímpico Juan de la Barrera	Dominik Mysterio (c) defeated Dragon Lee to retain the AAA Mega Championship	
25	WWE: NXT	Halloween Havoc	Prescott Valley, Arizona	Findlay Toyota Center	Ricky Saints (c) defeated Trick Williams to retain the NXT Championship	
26	Marigold	Grand Destiny	Tokyo, Japan	Ryōgoku Kokugikan	Iyo Sky defeated Mayu Iwatani	
26	Progress	Chapter 185: Jump In The Line	London, England	Electric Ballroom	Diamond Eyes (Connor Mills and Nico Angelo) defeated Lykos Gym (Kid Lykos and Kid Lykos II) (c) and Sunshine Machine (Chuck Mambo and TK Cooper) in a three-way ladder match to win the PROGRESS Tag Team Championship	
26	JCW	Possession	Ridgefield Park, New Jersey	Ridgefield Park Knights of Columbus	Billie Starkz defeated Charles Mason to win the vacant JCW World Championship	
27	MLP	REENA Rumble	Toronto, Ontario, Canada	NewAge Experience Centre	Mike Santana defeated Sheldon Jean	
29	AEW	Fright Night Dynamite	Edinburg, Texas	Bert Ogden Arena	Samoa Joe defeated Hook, Ricochet, and Bobby Lashley to determine the #1 contender to the AEW World Championship at Full Gear	Aired as a special episode of Dynamite.
30	Stardom	New Blood 26	Tokyo, Japan	Kanda Myojin Hall	Sakurara (Aya Sakura and Sayaka Kurara) defeated Rice or Bread (Hanako and Waka Tsukiyama) (c) to win the New Blood Tag Team Championship	
31	JCW	Hallowicked	Detroit, Michigan	Detroit Masonic Temple	Matt Cardona defeated 2 Tuff Tony (c) in a Carnival of Carnage match to win the JCW Heavyweight Championship	Aired on tape delay on January 1, 2026 as a special episode of Lunacy
(c) – denotes defending champion(s)

=== November ===
Date	Promotion(s)	Event	Location	Venue	Main Event	Notes
1	WWE: Raw; SmackDown	Saturday Night's Main Event XLI	Salt Lake City, Utah	Delta Center	CM Punk defeated Jey Uso to win the vacant World Heavyweight Championship	
2	GWF	Legacy: 30 Jahre Berlin Wrestling	Berlin, Germany	Festsaal Kreuzberg	Rambo defeated Axel Tischer (c) and Metehan to win the GWF World Championship	
2	NJPW	Tanahashi Final Homecoming	Gifu, Japan	Gifu Memorial Center Gymnasium	Konosuke Takeshita (c) defeated Hirooki Goto to retain the IWGP World Heavyweight Championship	Featured the finals of the 2025 Super Junior Tag League and the NJPW return of Kazuchika Okada.
3	CF: DDT	Ultimate Party	Tokyo, Japan	Ryōgoku Kokugikan	Yuki Ueno (Openweight) defeated Minoru Suzuki (Universal) in a Winner Takes All match to retain the KO-D Openweight Championship and win the DDT Universal Championship	
3	Stardom	Crimson Nightmare	Ōta, Japan	Ota City General Gymnasium	Saya Kamitani (c) defeated Momo Watanabe to retain the World of Stardom Championship and NJPW Strong Women's Championship	
7	GCW	You Wouldn't Understand	Hartford, Connecticut	Webster Theater	Bear Bronson defeated Ciclope in a Deathmatch	
7	DPW	Showdown in Cary II	Cary, North Carolina	SportHQ	LaBron Kozone (National) defeated Jake Something (Worlds) in a Champion vs. Champion match	Aired on tape delay on November 16.
7	West Coast Pro; Prestige	Strength Beyond Strength	Los Angeles, California	The Compound by Dirt Dog	Vinnie Massaro (c) defeated Royce Isaacs to retain the West Coast Pro Heavyweight Championship	
8	CF: Noah	Star Navigation; Night 3	Tokyo, Japan	Korakuen Hall	Yoshiki Inamura defeated Kenta (c) to win the GHC Heavyweight Championship	
12	AEW	Blood & Guts	Greensboro, North Carolina	First Horizon Coliseum	Darby Allin, Roderick Strong, and The Conglomeration (Mark Briscoe, Orange Cassidy, and Kyle O'Reilly) defeated Death Riders (Jon Moxley, Claudio Castagnoli, Wheeler Yuta, Daniel Garcia, and Pac) by submission in the Men's Blood and Guts match	Aired as a special episode of Dynamite. Featured the first ever Women's Blood and Guts match.
12	NJPW	Superhuman Taiji Ishimori Gets Ridiculous One More Time	Tokyo, Japan	Shinjuku FACE	Taiji Ishimori defeated Dragon Kid	
14	TNA	Turning Point	Winter Park, Florida	Full Sail University	Steve Maclin and Mike Santana defeated Frankie Kazarian and Nic Nemeth	
15	HOG	SuperClash	Brentwood, New York	Suffolk Credit Union Arena	Mercedes Moné defeated Nor 'Phoenix' Diana (c) to win the APAC Women's Championship	
16	Progress	Chapter 186: Noisy Neighbours	Manchester, England	The O_{2} Ritz	Cara Noir defeated "Blackheart" Lio Rush	
18	AAA; TNA; WWE: NXT; Evolve	Gold Rush	New York City, New York	The Theater at Madison Square Garden	Jacy Jayne defeated Tatum Paxley (c) in a Last Chance match to win the NXT Women's Championship	Aired as Part 1 of a special episode of NXT.
18	AAA; TNA; WWE: NXT; Evolve	Gold Rush	New York City, New York	The Theater at Madison Square Garden	Fallon Henley defeated Zaria to win the vacant WWE Women's Speed Championship	Aired on tape delay on November 25 as Part 2 of a special episode of NXT.
19	NJPW	Purge Night of Torture	Tokyo, Japan	Korakuen Hall	Evil vs. Yujiro Takahashi ended in a double knockout	
20	MLW	MLW x Don Gato Tequila: Lucha de los Muertos	Charleston, South Carolina	Charleston Music Hall	Killer Kross defeated Matt Riddle	Featured the finals of the 2025 Opera Cup, the MLW returns of Killer Kross and Scarlett Bordeaux, and the MLW debuts of The Good Brothers (Doc Gallows and Karl Anderson) and Isla Dawn.
21	CF: Noah	Cross Over in Sendai	Sendai, Japan	Sendai Sun Plaza	Yoshiki Inamura (c) defeated Kaito Kiyomiya to retain the GHC Heavyweight Championship	
21	HOG	Return to the Windy City	Chicago, Illinois	Logan Square Auditorium	Charles Mason (c) defeated Cedric Alexander to retain the HOG Heavyweight Championship	
21	REVOLVER; ARRIVAL	WrestleKombat	Newark, New Jersey	The Heart Ballroom	Bear Bronson defeated Krule in a Kaiju Deathmatch	
22	GCW	Dream On	East Rutherford, New Jersey	American Dream Mall	Atticus Cogar defeated Effy (c) and Charles Mason to win the GCW World Championship	Featured the GCW debut of Gail Kim and the GCW return of Sawyer Wreck.
22	AEW	Full Gear	Newark, New Jersey	Prudential Center	Samoa Joe defeated "Hangman" Adam Page (c) in a Steel Cage match to win the AEW World Championship	Featured the crowning of the inaugural AEW National Champion, and the returns of Paul Wight and Swerve Strickland.
23	JCW	Home For The Holidays	Ridgefield Park, New Jersey	Ridgefield Park Knights of Columbus	Lee Moriarty defeated Gringo Loco	
26	AEW	Thanksgiving Eve	Nashville, Tennessee	The Pinnacle	Claudio Castagnoli defeated Orange Cassidy in a Continental Classic Blue League match	Aired as a special episode of Dynamite.
26	AEW	Thanksgiving Collision	Nashville, Tennessee	The Pinnacle	Konosuke Takeshita defeated Roderick Strong in a Continental Classic Blue League match	Aired on November 27 as a special episode of Collision.
29	WWE: Raw; SmackDown	Survivor Series: WarGames	San Diego, California	Petco Park	Brock Lesnar, Drew McIntyre, Logan Paul, and The Vision (Bron Breakker and Bronson Reed) defeated CM Punk, Cody Rhodes, Roman Reigns, and The Usos (Jey Uso and Jimmy Uso) in the Men's WarGames match	Featured the return of Liv Morgan.
30	Progress	Chapter 187: Vendetta 3	London, England	Electric Ballroom	Man Like DeReiss (c) defeated Tate Mayfairs to retain the PROGRESS World Championship	
30	WrestleCade	WrestleCade Supershow	Winston-Salem, North Carolina	Benton Convention Center	The Hardys (Jeff Hardy and Matt Hardy) defeated The Rascalz (Dezmond Xavier and Zachary Wentz)	
(c) – denotes defending champion(s)

=== December ===
Date	Promotion(s)	Event	Location	Venue	Main Event	Notes
5	TNA	Final Resolution	El Paso, Texas	El Paso County Coliseum	Frankie Kazarian (c) defeated JDC to retain the TNA World Championship	Featured the debuts of Bear Bronson, Brock Anderson, and Dutch, and the returns of C. W. Anderson and Vincent.
5	ROH	Final Battle	Columbus, Ohio	Greater Columbus Convention Center	Athena (c) defeated Persephone to retain the ROH Women's World Championship	
5	GCW	Say You Will	Seattle, Washington	Washington Hall	Atticus Cogar (c) defeated Matt Tremont to retain the GCW World Championship	
6	GCW	Highest In The Room 4	Los Angeles, California	Ukrainian Cultural Center	Atticus Cogar (c) defeated Effy to retain the GCW World Championship	
6	WWE: NXT	Deadline	San Antonio, Texas	Boeing Center at Tech Port	Je'Von Evans defeated Leon Slater, Joe Hendry, Dion Lennox, and Myles Borne in the Men's Iron Survivor Challenge to earn an NXT Championship match	Featured the return of Tony D'Angelo.
7	GWF	Final Countdown	Berlin, Germany	Festsaal Kreuzberg	Rambo (c) defeated Peter Tihanyi to retain the GWF World Championship	
10	AEW	Winter Is Coming; Part 1	College Park, Georgia	Gateway Center Arena	Samoa Joe (c) defeated Eddie Kingston to retain the AEW World Championship	Aired as a special episode of Dynamite. Featured the crowning of the inaugural AEW Women's World Tag Team Champions.
12	DPW	4th Anniversary	Cary, North Carolina	SportHQ	LaBron Kozone (c) defeated Trevor Lee to retain the DPW Worlds Championship	Final DPW event in the US. Aired on tape delay on December 21.
13	wXw	25th Anniversary	Oberhausen, Germany	Turbinenhalle Oberhausen	Peter Tihanyi (c) defeated Ahura to retain the wXw Unified World Wrestling Championship	
13	AEW	Winter Is Coming; Part 2	Cardiff, Wales	Utilita Arena Cardiff	Mark Briscoe (c) defeated Daniel Garcia to retain the AEW TNT Championship	Aired as a special episode of Collision. First Winter Is Coming to take place outside the United States.
13	AEW	Dark: Stocking Stuffer	Cardiff, Wales	Utilita Arena Cardiff	Death Riders (Jon Moxley, Pac, and Wheeler Yuta) defeated Nathan Cruz and Grizzled Young Veterans (Zack Gibson and James Drake)	Aired on tape delay on December 16 as a one-night only special of Dark, which was the program's first episode since April 23, 2023.
13	GCW	Nick Gage Invitational 10	Orlando, Florida	Central Florida Fairgrounds	Bear Bronson defeated Otis Cogar in an Exposed Boards, Lightubes, Panes of Glass and Barbed Wire Deathmatch in the Nick Gage Invitational final	
13	REVOLVER	Season Finale	Des Moines, Iowa	Horizon Events Center	Krule defeated Alan Angels in a Macabre Deathmatch	
13	WWE: Raw; SmackDown; NXT	Saturday Night's Main Event XLII: John Cena's Final Match	Washington, D.C.	Capital One Arena	Gunther defeated John Cena	Featured John Cena's retirement match.
14	JCW	Roundball Rock	Ridgefield Park, New Jersey	Ridgefield Park Knights of Columbus	Billie Starkz (c) defeated Charles Mason in an "I Quit" match to retain the JCW World Championship	
14	RevPro	Uprising	Cardiff, Wales	Vale Arena	Jay Joshua defeated Sha Samuels (c) to win the Undisputed British Heavyweight Championship	
17	AEW	Holiday Bash	Manchester, England	Co-op Live	Bandido and Ricochet last eliminated Bishop Kaun in the Dynamite Diamond Battle Royale	Aired as Part 1 of a special episode of Dynamite.
17	AEW	Holiday Bash	Manchester, England	Co-op Live	FTR (Cash Wheeler and Dax Harwood) (c) defeated Bang Bang Gang (Juice Robinson and Austin Gunn) to retain the AEW World Tag Team Championship	Aired as Part 2 of a special episode of Collision.
17	AEW	Holiday Bash	Manchester, England	Co-op Live	Kevin Knight defeated Kazuchika Okada in a Continental Classic Gold League match	Aired on tape delay on December 20 as Part 3 of a special episode of Collision.
18	ROH	Global Wars United Kingdom	Cardiff, Wales; Manchester, England	Utilita Arena Cardiff; Co-op Live	Nigel McGuinness defeated Wheeler Yuta	
18	REVOLVER	Holiday Special	Dayton, Ohio	Calumet Center at Montgomery County Fairgrounds	The Rascalz (Trey Miguel, Zachary Wentz, Myron Reed, and Dezmond Xavier) defeated BDE and A.S.S. (Brent Oakley, KC Jacobs, and D**k Meyers) in a Ho Ho Holy Shit eight-man tag team match	
19	HOG	Winter Warfare	New York City, New York	NYC Arena	Charles Mason (c) defeated Mustafa Ali to retain the HOG Heavyweight Championship	
19	JCW	Big Ballers Holiday Party	Milwaukee, Wisconsin	The Rave/Eagles Club	Caleb Konley defeated Kerry Morton	Aired on tape delay on January 15, 2026
20	AAA	Guerra de Titanes	Guadalajara, Mexico	Arena Guadalajara	Rey Fénix and Rey Mysterio defeated Los Gringos Locos 2.0 (Dominik Mysterio and El Grande Americano)	
20	AEW	Dynamite on 34th Street	New York City, New York	Hammerstein Ballroom	"Jungle" Jack Perry defeated Pac in a Continental Classic Gold League match	Aired on tape delay on December 24 as a special episode of Dynamite.
21	AEW	Christmas Collision	New York City, New York	Hammerstein Ballroom	Kazuchika Okada defeated "Speedball" Mike Bailey in a Continental Classic Gold League match	Aired on tape delay on December 25 as a special episode of Collision.
25	Stardom	New Blood 27	Tokyo, Japan	Bellesalle Shibuya First	Hanako (c) defeated Rian to retain the Future of Stardom Championship	
27	AEW	Worlds End	Hoffman Estates, Illinois	Now Arena	MJF defeated Samoa Joe (c), "Hangman" Adam Page, and Swerve Strickland to win the AEW World Championship	Featured the finals of the 2025 Continental Classic.
28	Progress	Chapter 188: Unboxing VIII: The Search For Socks	London, England	Electric Ballroom	Rayne Leverkusen (c) defeated Kanji to retain the Progress World Women's Championship	
29	Stardom	Dream Queendom	Tokyo, Japan	Ryōgoku Kokugikan	Saya Kamitani (c) defeated Saori Anou to retain the World of Stardom Championship	
31	AEW	New Year's Smash	Ralston, Nebraska	Liberty First Credit Union Arena	Willow Nightingale defeated Mercedes Moné (c) to win the AEW TBS Championship	Aired as a special episode of Dynamite.
31	GCW	Do Or Die	Ridgefield Park, New Jersey	Ridgefield Park Knights of Columbus	Priscilla Kelly defeated Shotzi Blackheart in a Six Feet Under Deathmatch	
(c) – denotes defending champion(s)

== Notable events ==
- January 1 –
  - Fight for the Fallen special of AEW Dynamite began All Elite Wrestling's (AEW) new media rights deal with Warner Bros. Discovery (WBD), where Dynamite, AEW Collision, and other television specials would be simulcast on their respective TV channels (TBS and TNT) and WBD's streaming platform Max.
  - WWE Network nearly worldwide shut down, with WWE content moved to Netflix in international markets where WWE Network was still available. A select few territories maintained the WWE Network throughout 2025 due to pre-existing contracts. Most of these transitioned to Netflix on January 1, 2026, with only Austria, Germany, Italy, and Switzerland still on the Network in 2026 for an undetermined period of time, while Sub-Saharan Africa and Japan remain on SuperSport and Abema, respectively.
- January 3 – WWE SmackDown expanded to three hours for the first time since its inception.
- January 6 – WWE Raw premiered on Netflix after airing on the USA Network since 2005, also marking the first time in the show's history in which it did not air on linear television. Also for the first time and due to the advantage of the streaming platform over set runtimes on cable, the show became flexible, with WWE Chief Content Officer Paul "Triple H" Levesque stating the average runtime would be around 2.5 hours.
- January 16 – WWE and Total Nonstop Action Wrestling (TNA) announced a multi-year partnership, allowing more opportunities for wrestlers from WWE's NXT brand to perform at TNA events and vice versa. An agreement between the two companies began in January 2024, which saw various wrestlers from each company appearing and performing on the other's shows.
- February 12 – Carlos Silva was appointed President of Total Nonstop Action Wrestling (TNA), after the resignation of Anthony Cicone.
- February 15 – Grand Slam Australia and Global Wars Australia were All Elite Wrestling (AEW) and Ring of Honor's (ROH) first events in Australia, respectively; AEW's event aired on tape delay later that same day in the United States while ROH's event aired on tape delay on February 17.
- February 16 – WWE LFG premiered on A&E.
- March 1 – At WWE Elimination Chamber, John Cena turned heel for the first time since 2003.
- March 5 – WWE Evolve, a relaunch of the defunct Evolve promotion under WWE as the Evolve brand, premiered on Tubi in the United States and YouTube internationally.
- March 9 – After winning the AEW International Championship at Revolution, Kenny Omega became recognized as All Elite Wrestling's (AEW) first Grand Slam Champion, after previously holding the AEW World Championship, AEW World Tag Team Championship, and AEW World Trios Championship.
- April 16 – The Spring BreakThru special of AEW Dynamite was the program's 289th episode, making it the longest-running prime time weekly pro-wrestling program in Turner Sports history, surpassing the former World Championship Wrestling's Monday Nitro, which had a total of 288 episodes.
- April 19 – WWE announced their acquisition of Lucha Libre AAA Worldwide, and the return of WWE Worlds Collide involving AAA.
- April 28 – Mayu Iwatani announced her departure from World Wonder Ring Stardom, later signing with Dream Star Fighting Marigold on May 1.
- April 30 – Hulk Hogan, Eric Bischoff, and freestyle wrestling trainer Izzy Martinez announced the formation of Real American Freestyle (RAF), an unscripted freestyle wrestling league that launched on August 30.
- May 25 – Trick Williams became the first WWE-contracted wrestler to hold a Total Nonstop Action Wrestling (TNA) title by defeating Joe Hendry for the TNA World Championship at NXT Battleground.
- July 4 – WWE SmackDown returned to two hours after airing for three hours since January 3.
- July 6 – Tiger Mask officially announced that 2026 would be his final year as an in-ring performer, retiring in June of that year.
- July 9 – WWE Speed aired its final episode. No official statement was made regarding the future of the series, but on August 24, it was confirmed that the program's championships would be defended on WWE's NXT brand going forward, effectively confirming that the series had been quietly cancelled.
- July 12 – All In: Texas was All Elite Wrestling's (AEW) first event in a Major League Baseball stadium and the first professional wrestling event held at Globe Life Field. During the main event, Darby Allin made his AEW return for the first time since 2024 after taking a hiatus to successfully climb Mount Everest.
- July 20 – NXT Women's Champion Jacy Jayne became the first wrestler to simultaneously hold titles in both WWE and Total Nonstop Action Wrestling (TNA) by defeating Masha Slamovich for the TNA Knockouts World Championship at Slammiversary.
- July 24 – Hulk Hogan died at the age of 71 as a result of a cardiac arrest.
- July 29 –
  - NWA Powerrr premiered on The Roku Channel in the United States, Canada, and Mexico, after streaming on X since October 2024.
  - WWE: Unreal premiered on Netflix, a docuseries going behind-the-scenes of various WWE events.
- August 2 and 3 – First two-night WWE SummerSlam.
- August 3 – At the conclusion of Night 2 of SummerSlam, Brock Lesnar made his WWE return for the first time since SummerSlam in 2023 after being on hiatus due to being named in the Vince McMahon sex trafficking scandal.
- August 24 – The All Elite Wrestling and New Japan Pro-Wrestling cross-promoted event, Forbidden Door, broke The O2 Arena's attendance record for a professional wrestling event.
- August 31 – Clash in Paris was WWE's final main roster pay-per-view and livestreaming event to air on Peacock, which had exclusive distribution rights to WWE Network content in the United States since March 2021. Peacock will maintain NXT's livestreaming events until at least March 2026, as well as other content, such as Saturday Night's Main Event, for the next several years.
- September 5 – On WWE SmackDown, AJ Lee made her return to WWE for the first time since initially retiring from in-ring competition on April 3, 2015.
- September 12 – WWE announced that WrestleMania 43 in 2027 would be held in Saudi Arabia, marking the first-ever WrestleMania to be held outside of North America.
- September 20 –
  - All Out was All Elite Wrestling's first pay-per-view event available to livestream on HBO Max, with subscribers getting a discount (US$39.99 as opposed to US$49.99).
  - Wrestlepalooza was WWE's first main roster pay-per-view and livestreaming event to air on ESPN's direct-to-consumer streaming service in the United States (this changeover was originally slated to begin with WrestleMania 42 in April 2026).
- September 24 – All Elite Wrestling (AEW) announced the establishment of the AEW Women's World Tag Team Championship.
- October 7 – A special episode of WWE NXT aired titled NXT vs. TNA Showdown (originally titled Invasion), which featured wrestlers from Total Nonstop Action Wrestling (TNA) facing off against NXT wrestlers for promotional supremacy, marking the first "invasion" angle since WWE acquired World Championship Wrestling in 2001. At the event, The Hardys (Matt Hardy and Jeff Hardy) became the first TNA-contracted wrestlers to hold WWE titles by defeating DarkState (Dion Lennox and Osiris Griffin) for the NXT Tag Team Championship.
- October 10 – During WWE's Crown Jewel Kickoff event, AJ Styles officially announced that 2026 would be his final year as an in-ring performer, retiring at the end of that year.
- October 15 – WWE Evolve aired its first television special titled "Succession", which was taped on September 23 and aired on tape delay.
- November 8 – Deadlock Pro-Wrestling announced the company would be going on an indefinite hiatus in 2026, with 4th Anniversary being its last ever show in the United States.
- November 10 – During WWE Raw, John Cena defeated Dominik Mysterio to win the WWE Intercontinental Championship for the first time, thus simultaneously completing the WWE Triple Crown and WWE Grand Slam.
- November 13 – During TNA Impact!, JDC officially announced that he would retire in 2026 following January's Genesis event.
- November 14 – WWE SmackDown was announced to return to three hours on January 2, 2026, after reverting to two hours on July 4, 2025.
- December 2 – TNA Wrestling and AMC Networks announced a multi-year television deal to air TNA's flagship weekly television series, TNA Impact! on Thursday nights, beginning January 15, 2026, marking TNA's return to a major cable television channel for the first time since 2014.
- December 13 – At WWE's Saturday Night's Main Event XLII: John Cena's Final Match, John Cena tapped out to Gunther in the former's retirement match, marking the first time that Cena had tapped out since 2004 to Kurt Angle.
- December 24 – At All Elite Wrestling's (AEW) Dynamite on 34th Street special, which was taped on December 20, Bandido became only the second wrestler to win the AEW Dynamite Diamond Ring since its inception in 2019; MJF had won it every year from 2019 to 2024 but was excluded from the 2025 event.

== Accomplishments and tournaments ==
=== 2AW ===
Accomplishment	Winner(s)	Date	Notes
Active Advance Tournament	Naka Shuma	November 24	Defeated Ayato Yoshida in the final to win.

=== AAA ===
Accomplishment	Winner(s)	Date	Notes
Rey de Reyes	Niño Hamburguesa	March 22	Defeated El Mesías, El Hijo de Dr. Wagner Jr. and DMT Azul in the final to win.
Copa Bardahl	Omos	August 16	Last eliminated La Parka to win the Copa Bardahl Trophy.

=== AAW ===
Accomplishment	Winner(s)	Date	Notes
Chi-Town Rumble	Davey Vega	January 31	Last eliminated Isaiah Moore to win.
Jim Lynam Memorial ladder match	The Hellhounds (Russ Jones and Schaff)	November 22	Defeated Twist & Flip (Darren Fly and Nate Kobain), The Wrong Ones (Joey Avalon and Aaron Roberts), and Stallion Rogers to earn an AAA Tag Team Championship match. They defeated The Good Brothers (Doc Gallows and Karl Anderson) to win the titles at Windy City Classic XX.

=== AEW ===
Accomplishment	Winner(s)	Date	Notes
International Women's Cup	Momo Watanabe	January 5	Defeated Athena, Persephone, and Willow Nightingale in the final to earn a championship opportunity from the promotion of her choosing (AEW, ROH, CMLL, or Stardom). She chose to challenge Mercedes Moné for the AEW TBS Championship at Revolution but was unsuccessful.
Maximum Carnage Casino Gauntlet match	Powerhouse Hobbs	January 8	Pinned Kyle O'Reilly to earn an AEW World Championship match at Dynamite: Maximum Carnage. He challenged Jon Moxley for the title at the event but was unsuccessful.
Grand Slam Australia Casino Gauntlet match	Toni Storm	January 15	Pinned Julia Hart to earn an AEW Women's World Championship match at Grand Slam Australia. She defeated Mariah May to win the title at the event.
AEW International Championship Eliminator Tournament	"Speedball" Mike Bailey and Ricochet	March 19	Defeated Orange Cassidy and Mark Davis in the final to earn an AEW International Championship match at Dynasty. Both were declared co-winners after a double pin on Davis. They challenge Kenny Omega for the title at the AEW Dynasty but were unsuccessful .
Owen Hart Cup (Women)	Mercedes Moné	May 25	Defeated Jamie Hayter in the final to win the Owen Hart Cup Trophy, Championship, and an AEW World Women's Championship match at All In. She challenged "Timeless" Toni Storm for the title at the event but was unsuccessful.
Owen Hart Cup (Men)	"Hangman" Adam Page	May 25	Defeated Will Ospreay in the final to win the Owen Hart Cup Trophy, Championship, and an AEW World Championship match at All In. He defeated Jon Moxley in a Texas Deathmatch to win the title at the event.
AEW International Championship Tournament	Kenny Omega	June 4	Defeated Brody King, Claudio Castagnoli, and Mascara Dorada in the final to retain the AEW International Championship.
All In Casino Gauntlet match (Women)	Athena	July 12	Pinned Mina Shirakawa to earn an AEW Women's World Championship match contract. She executed her contract to challenge "Timeless" Toni Storm for the title at Forbidden Door, but was unsuccessful.
All In Casino Gauntlet match (Men)	MJF	July 12	Pinned Roderick Strong to earn an AEW World Championship match contract. He executed his contract to enter the three-way match between champion Samoa Joe, "Hangman" Adam Page, and Swerve Strickland at Worlds End, making it a four-way match, where he won the title.
AEW World Tag Team Championship Eliminator Tournament	FTR (Dax Harwood and Cash Wheeler) and Brodido (Bandido and Brody King)	August 20	The final ended in a time limit draw. Both teams went on to challenge The Hurt Syndicate (Bobby Lashley and Shelton Benjamin) for the AEW World Tag Team Championship at Forbidden Door in a three-way tag team match, which was won by Brodido.
AEW Unified Championship Tournament	Kazuchika Okada	September 20	Defeated Konosuke Takeshita and Máscara Dorada in the final to retain the AEW Unified Championship.
Full Gear Casino Gauntlet Match	Ricochet	November 22	Pinned Kevin Knight to become the inaugural AEW National Champion.
AEW Women's World Tag Team Championship Tournament	The Babes of Wrath (Harley Cameron and Willow Nightingale)	December 10	Defeated Timeless Love Bombs ("Timeless" Toni Storm and Mina Shirakawa) in the final to become the inaugural AEW Women's World Tag Team Champions.
Dynamite Diamond Battle Royale	Bandido and Ricochet	December 17	Bandido last eliminated Bishop Kaun. Both men faced each other in the final at Dynamite on 34th Street for the AEW Dynamite Diamond Ring, which Bandido won, also earning him an AEW World Championship match at Dynamite: Maximum Carnage on January 14, 2026. He challenged MJF for the title at the event but was unsuccessful.
Continental Classic	Jon Moxley	December 27	Defeated AEW Unified Champion Kazuchika Okada in the final to win the AEW Continental Championship.

=== AIW ===
Accomplishment	Winner(s)	Date	Notes
Gauntlet for the Gold	Chuck Stone	April 26	Last eliminated Isaiah Broner to earn an AIW Absolute Championship match. He defeated Eric Turner to win the title at Absolution XVIII.
JT Lightning Invitational Tournament	Wes Barkley	September 20	Defeated Sam Holloway in the final to win.

=== AJPW ===
Accomplishment	Winner(s)	Date	Notes
Champion Carnival	Rei Saito	May 18	Defeated Kento Miyahara in the final to earn a Triple Crown Heavyweight Championship match. He challenged Jun Saito for the title on the first night of the Super Power Series tour but was unsuccessful.
Zennichi Junior Festival	Atsuki Aoyagi	August 3	Defeated Rising Hayato in the final to earn a future World Junior Heavyweight Championship match. He defeated Seiki Yoshioka to win the title on the second night of the Nettou Summer Action Wars tour.
Royal Road Tournament	Kento Miyahara	September 15	Defeated Ryuki Honda in the final to earn a Triple Crown Heavyweight Championship match. He defeated Jun Saito to win the title at Giant Dream.
Real World Tag League	Titans of Calamity (Ren Ayabe and Talos)	December 10	Defeated World Tag Team Champions Havoc (Xyon and Oddyssey) in the final to earn a title match. They defeated Havoc to win the titles on the first night of the New Year Wars tour.

=== Basara ===
Accomplishment	Winner(s)	Date	Notes
Itadaki	Ryota Nakatsu	May 23	Defeated Keisuke Ishii in the final to win.
Iron Fist Tag Tournament	Masato Kamino and Takato Nakano	October 15	Defeated MJ2 (Kyu Mogami and Naka Shuma) in the final to win.

=== BJW ===
Accomplishment	Winner(s)	Date	Notes
Our Ikkitousen	Kazumasa Yoshida	May 5	Won a five-man round-robin tournament to qualify for the Ikkitousen Strong Climb.
Ikkitousen Strong Climb	Leyton Buzzard	June 22 (aired July 5)	Defeated So Daimonji in the final to win.
King of Deathmatch World GP	Masada and Rina Yamashita	December 31	Defeated The Beastman and Mickie Knuckles win the final to win.

=== BZW ===
Accomplishment	Winner(s)	Date	Notes
Miracle Cup	Jordan Oliver	November 11	Defeated Connor Mills in the final to win the Miracle Cup Trophy.

=== CF ===
==== DDT ====
Accomplishment	Winner(s)	Date	Notes
D Generations Cup	Yuya Koroku	February 23	Defeated Takeshi Masada in the final to earn a KO-D Openweight Championship match. He challenged Chris Brookes for the title at Change Age but was unsuccessful.
Twilight Rouge Cup Battle Royal	Kazuki Hirata	June 21	Last eliminated To-y to win.
King of DDT Tournament	Kazusada Higuchi	May 25	Defeated Kanon in the final to earn a KO-D Openweight Championship match. He defeated Chris Brookes to win the title at King of Kings.
KO-D Openweight Championship #1 Contender's Battle Royal	Yuki Ueno	July 16	Last eliminated Kazuki Hirata to earn a KO-D Openweight Championship match. He defeated Kazusada Higuchi to win the title on Night 2 of Wrestle Peter Pan.
Daisuke Sasaki Memorial Cup Tag Team Gauntlet	Keisuke Ishii and Shigehiro Irie	October 2	Last eliminated Ilusion and Yasutaka Oosera to win.
World Ōmori Championship #1 Contender's Battle Royal	Ilusion	November 16 (aired November 21)	Last eliminated Demus to earn a World Ōmori Championship match.

==== Noah ====
Accomplishment	Winner(s)	Date	Notes
Noah The Rumble	Tadasuke	January 1	Last eliminated LJ Cleary to earn a GHC National Championship match the following night at New Year Reboot. He challenged Manabu Soya for the title but was unsuccessful.
Junior Tag League	Amakusa and Junta Miyawaki	March 2	Defeated Mark Trew and Kieron Lacey in the final to earn a GHC Junior Heavyweight Tag Team Championship match. They defeated Passionate Ratel's (Hayata and Yo-Hey) to win the titles on Night 3 of Star Navigation Premium.
GHC National Championship Tournament	Galeno	April 11	Defeated Tetsuya Endo in the final to win the vacant title.
N-1 Victory	Masa Kitamiya	September 23	Defeated Jack Morris in the final to earn a GHC Heavyweight Championship match. He challenged Kenta for the title at Wrestle Odyssey but was unsuccessful.
Jr. Grand Prix	Hiromu Takahashi	November 21	Defeated Kai Fujimura in the final to win. As the reigning GHC Junior Heavyweight Champion, his next challenger was chosen as Amakusa, who defeated him to win the title at The New Year.
Noahful Gift Christmas Battle Royal	Kazuyuki Fujita	December 23	Last eliminated Tree Man to win.

==== TJPW ====
Accomplishment	Winner(s)	Date	Notes
Princess of Princess Championship #1 Contender's Battle Royal	Rika Tatsumi	January 11	Last eliminated Shoko Nakajima to earn a Princess of Princess Championship match. She challenged Mizuki for the title at Grand Princess '25 but was unsuccessful.
"Futari wa Princess" Max Heart Tournament	Kyoraku Kyomei (Hyper Misao and Shoko Nakajima)	February 8	Defeated Max the Impaler and Pom Harajuku in the final to earn a Princess Tag Team Championship match. They defeated 121000000 (Miyu Yamashita and Maki Itoh) to win the titles at Grand Princess '25.
Tokyo Princess Cup	Miu Watanabe	August 23	Defeated Arisu Endo in the final to earn a Princess of Princess Championship match. She defeated Mizuki to win the title at Wrestle Princess VI.
Next Generation Tournament	Uta Takami	October 26	Defeated Chika Nanase in the final to win.
Princess Rumble	Mizuki	December 27	Last eliminated Mifu Ashida to win.

=== ChocoPro ===
Accomplishment	Winner(s)	Date	Notes
Tag Team Tournament	Lion Dance (Choun Shiryu and Leon)	February 2	Defeated BestBros (Mei Suruga and Baliyan Akki) in the final to earn an Asia Dream Tag Team Championship match. They challenged Black Komanechi (Antonio Honda and Tokiko Kirihara) for the titles at ChocoPro 430: Fair Fight but were unsuccessful.

=== CMLL ===
Accomplishment	Winner(s)	Date	Notes
CMLL World Micro-Estrellas Championship Tournament	Tengu	January 1	Defeated KeMalito in the final to win the vacant title.
International Women's Cup	Momo Watanabe	January 5	Defeated Athena, Persephone, and Willow Nightingale in the final to earn a championship opportunity from the promotion of her choosing (AEW, ROH, CMLL, or Stardom). She chose to challenge Mercedes Moné for the AEW TBS Championship at Revolution but was unsuccessful.
Lucha Gauntlet	Taiji Ishimori	January 5	Pinned El Desperado to win.
Reyes del Aire	Neón	February 4	Last eliminated Templario in a torneo cibernetico to win.
Copa Herederos	El Hijo del Villano III	February 22	Last eliminated Blue Panther Jr. in a torneo cibernetico to win.
Torneo de Facciones	Los Ingobernables de Japon (Bushi and Titán)	February 26	Defeated Los Depredadores (Magnus and Rugido) in the final to win.
Torneo de Escuelas	Team CDMX (Alexius, Fury Boy, Pendulo, Poseidon, and Troyano)	February 28	Defeated Team Querétaro (Atomico Jr., Galactico Dragon, Kastigador Jr., Samuray Azteca, and Vengador) and Team Puebla (Astro, Blue Shark, Dreyko, El Vigia, and Tiger Boy) in the final to win.
CMLL World Women's Tag Team Championship	Las Chicas Indomables (La Jarochita and Lluvia)	March 21	Defeated Taya Valkyrie and Lady Frost in the final to win the vacant titles.
Copa 82 Aniversario Cibernetico	Skadi	April 5	Last eliminated Persephone to win.
CMLL Universal Championship	Titán	April 25	Defeated Ángel de Oro and Esfinge in the final, which was contested as a three-way elimination match, to win.
Embajador de los Ninos	Futuro	April 27	Last eliminated Max Star in a torneo cibernetico to win.
La Copa Junior	Zandokan Jr.	May 30	Defeated Máscara Dorada in the final to win.
Copa Dinistias	Guerreros de la Atlantida (Atlantis and Atlantis Jr.)	June 15	Defeated Los Divinos Laguneros (Blue Panther and Blue Panther Jr.) in the final to win.
CMLL Barroco Championship	Blue Shark	July 21	Defeated Robin in the final to win.
Leyenda de Plata	Neón	July 25	Defeated Máscara Dorada in the final to win.
International Gran Prix	Místico	August 29	Last eliminated "Speedball" Mike Bailey in a torneo cibernetico to win the International Gran Prix Trophy.
Copa Independencia	Templario and Titán	September 19	Defeated El Galeón Fantasma (Barboza and Difunto) in the final.
CMLL Universal Amazons Championship	India Sioux	October 17	Defeated Skadi in the final to win.
International Amazons Gran Prix	Persephone	October 24	Last eliminated Thekla in a torneo cibernetico to win the International Gran Prix Trophy.
Rey del Inframundo	Guerrero Maya Jr.	October 31	Defeated defending champion Difunto, Adrenalina, and Villano III Jr. in the final to win.
Occidente Tag Team Championship Tournament	Gallo Jr. and Ráfaga Jr.	November 4	Defeated Prince Drago and Black Warrior Jr. in the final to win the vacant titles.
Leyenda de Azul	Bárbaro Cavernario	November 28	Defeated Místico and Soberano Jr. in the final to win.
Gran Alternativa	Atlantis Jr. and Xelhua	December 19	Defeated Ángel de Oro and Yutani in the final to win.

=== The Crash ===
Accomplishment	Winner(s)	Date	Notes
Copa Aniversario	Valentino	November 7	Last eliminated Cibernético in a torneo cibernetico to win.

=== CZW ===
Accomplishment	Winner(s)	Date	Notes
Tournament of Death XXII	Shlak	September 6	Defeated Judge Joe Dred in the final to win.

=== DEFY ===
Accomplishment	Winner(s)	Date	Notes
Super 8XGP Tournament	Clark Connors	March 15	Defeated Starboy Charlie in the final to win the vacant DEFY World Championship.
Super Heavyweight Cup	Killer Kross	September 19	Defeated Calvin Tankman to become "the best big man on the independent circuit in 2025."

=== DG ===
Accomplishment	Winner(s)	Date	Notes
Young Dragon Cup	Yoshiki Kato	January 19	Defeated Mochizuki Jr. in the final to win.
Rey de Parejas	Z-Brats (Shun Skywalker and Homare)	March 30	Defeated Z-Brats (Kota Minoura and Jason Lee) in the final to win.
Open the Brave Gate Championship Tournament	U-T	May 5	Defeated Homare in the final to win the vacant title.
King of Gate	Gianni Valletta	December 3	Defeated Ishin in the final to earn an Open the Dream Gate Championship match. He challenged Madoka Kikuta for the title on Night 9 of Fantastic Gate but was unsuccessful.
Open the Triangle Gate Championship League	Love & Peace (Ben-K, Hyo, and Mochizuki Jr.)	December 27	Defeated Gajadokuro (Kota Minoura, Jason Lee, and Kai) and Natural Vibes (Kzy, U-T, and Strong Machine J) in the final, which was contested as a three-way tag team elimination match, to win the vacant titles.

=== Diana ===
Accomplishment	Winner(s)	Date	Notes
Crystal Tournament	Honoka	April 27	Defeated Soy in the final to win the vacant World Woman Pro-Wrestling Diana Crystal Championship.
Diana Tag Team Championship #1 Contender's Tournament	Blue Orchid (Risa Sera and Miran)	August 16	Defeated Nanami Hateno and Rina Amikura in the final to earn a World Woman Pro-Wrestling Diana Tag Team Championship match. They challenged Caffeine & Crush (Ayako Sato and Debbie Keitel) for the titles on September 3 but were unsuccessful.

=== DPW ===
Accomplishment	Winner(s)	Date	Notes
DPW Worlds Championship Ultimate Conflict Match	Adam Priest	April 18 (aired April 23)	Last eliminated Calvin Tankman to win the vacant DPW Worlds Championship.
Tag Festival	Miracle Generation (Dustin Waller and Kylon King)	July 13 (aired July 20)	Defeated Jake Something and The Beast Mortos, The WorkHorsemen (Anthony Henry and JD Drake), and DPW Worlds Tag Team Champions Grizzled Young Veterans (Zack Gibson and James Drake) in the final, which was a four-way tag team elimination match, to win the titles.
Carolina Classic	Jake Something	September 14 (aired September 21)	Defeated Calvin Tankman, LaBron Kozone, and Trevor Lee in the final, which was contested as a four-way elimination match, to earn a DPW Worlds Championship. He defeated Adam Priest in a Steel Cage match to win the title at Super Battle.
Battle of the Best Tournament	Queen Aminata	September 14 (aired September 21)	Defeated Mei Suruga and Yuu in the final to earn a DPW Women's Worlds Championship match. She defeated Nicole Matthews to win the title at Super Battle.

=== EVE ===
Accomplishment	Winner(s)	Date	Notes
SHE-1	Nina Samuels	January 10	Defeated Alex Windsor in the final to retain the Pro-Wrestling: EVE Championship and the Pro-Wrestling: EVE International Championship.
Multiverse Rumble	Kasey	February 7	Dressed as "The Greatest Showman"; last eliminated Amira Blair (dressed as "Sexy Oscar the Ref") to win.

=== GCW ===
Accomplishment	Winner(s)	Date	Notes
The Jersey Lotto	Matthew Justice	February 16	Last eliminated Mr. Danger to earn a JCW World Championship match. He challenged Masha Slamovich for the title at So Much Fun but was unsuccessful.
Jersey J-Cup	Masha Slamovich	February 16	Defeated Alec Price in the final to retain the JCW World Championship.
Clusterfuck Battle Royal	Brodie Lee Jr.	April 19	Last eliminated Joey Janela to win.
Tournament of Survival X	Matt Tremont	June 7	Defeated Otis Cogar in the final, which was contested in a Concrete Hell Deathmatch, to retain the GCW Ultraviolent Championship.
The Jersey Lotto	Marcus Mathers	July 6	Last eliminated Griffin McCoy to earn a JCW World Championship match. He challenged Masha Slamovich for the title at JCW High Noon but was unsuccessful.
Monster Mash Rumble	Ryan Clancy	October 26	Last eliminated Sam Holloway to win.
Luna Vachon Invitational	Billie Starkz	October 26	Defeated Emersyn Jayne and Lena Kross in the final, which was contested as a three-way elimination match, to compete for the vacant JCW World Championship later that night. She would defeat Charles Mason to win the title.
Nick Gage Invitational	Bear Bronson	December 13	Defeated Otis Cogar in the final, which was contested in an Exposed Boards, Light Tubes, Panes of Glass, Barbed Wire Deathmatch.
Do or Die Rumble	Otis Cogar	December 31	Last eliminated 1 Called Manders to earn a GCW World Championship match at any time and any place of his choosing. Instead of challenging for the GCW World Championship, however, Cogar announced he would challenge Matt Tremont for the GCW Ultraviolent Championship at Code of the Streets. He would defeat Tremont in a deathmatch at the event to win the title.

=== Gleat ===
Accomplishment	Winner(s)	Date	Notes
G-Rex Championship #1 Contender's Battle Royal	Kaito Ishida	January 11	Last eliminated Takanori Ito to earn a G-Rex Championship match later in the night. He would defeat Soma Watanabe to win the title.
G-Rush Tournament	El Lindaman	January 24	Defeated Issei Onitsuka in the final to compete for the inaugural G-Rush Championship. He defeated Lio Rush to win the title at Gleat Ver. 16.
One Day Tag Tournament Gotanda Cup	Ryo Aitaka and T-Hawk	March 29	Defeated El Lindaman and Katsuhiko Nakajima in the final to win.
G-Class Tournament	Katsuhiko Nakajima	June 1	Defeated Ryo Aitaka in the final to win.
G-Infinity Tournament	Black Generation International (Kaito Ishida and Kazma Sakamoto)	December 13	Defeated El Lindaman and Takehiro Yamamura in the final to win the vacant G-Infinity Championship.

=== GWF ===
Accomplishment	Winner(s)	Date	Notes
World Cup	Axel Tischer	May 4	Defeated Aytaç Bahar, Erkan Sulcani, and Robbie X in the final, which was contested as a four-way elimination match, to earn a GWF World Championship match. He defeated champion Metehan and Erkan Sulcani in a three-way match to win the title at Rising Heat.
Battlefield match	Metehan and Rambo	September 7	Both men eliminated each other simultaneously. Thus, both men earned a GWF World Championship match. They challenged Axel Tischer for the title in a three-way match at Legacy: 30 Jahre Berlin Wrestling, which Rambo won.

=== HOG ===
Accomplishment	Winner(s)	Date	Notes
Matt Travis Memorial Battle Royal	Amazing Red	August 1	Last eliminated Idris Jackson.
LPW Tag Team Championship Tournament	Dual Focus (JJP and KB Prime)	December 20	Defeated Scam Likely (Jay Champagne and Vic Vendetta) to become the inaugural champions.

=== Ice Ribbon ===
Accomplishment	Winner(s)	Date	Notes
One Day Tournament	Manami Katsu	September 27	Defeated Satsuki Totoro in the final to win.
ICE×∞ Championship #1 Contender's Tournament	Kaho Matsushita	December 7	Defeated Miku Kanae in the final to earn an ICE×∞ Championship match. She defeated Kirari Wakana and Yuuki in a three-way two out of three falls match to win the vacant title.

=== IWRG ===
Accomplishment	Winner(s)	Date	Notes
El Protector	El Hijo de Canis Lupus and Super Boy	February 16	Last eliminated El Hijo de Pirata Morgan and Principe Centauro in a torneo cibernetico to win.
Tryout Tournament	Golden Power	March 13	Defeated Fly and Pentagóncito Black in the final to win.
Guerra del Golfo	Cerebro Negro	April 4	Defeated Mr. Mike in the final, which was a Hair vs. Hair match, to win.
Rey del Ring	El Hijo de Pirata Morgan	June 1	Last eliminated Vangelys to win.
Ruleta de la Muerte	Aguila Roja	August 17	Defeated Spider Fly in the final to win the IWRG Rey del Aire Championship. This was a Winner Takes All match where Roja's IWRG Intercontinental Lightweight Championship was also on the line.
El Castillo del Terror	El Hijo de Canis Lupus	October 30	Defeated Abigor in the final, which was a Mask vs. Mask match, to win.

=== JCW ===
Accomplishment	Winner(s)	Date	Notes
JCW Tag Team Championship Tournament	Brothers of Funstruction (Yabo the Clown and Ruffo the Clown)	March 8 (aired April 10)	Defeated The Backseat Boyz (JP Grayson and Tommy Grayson) in the final to win the vacant titles.
JCW Battle Royal Championship Battle Royal	Ricky Morton	March 8 (aired April 17)	Last eliminated Kerry Morton to become the inaugural champion.
2 Tuff Country Rumble	Kerry Morton	September 18 (aired October 30)	Last eliminated Ricky Morton to win the JCW Battle Royal Championship.

=== JTO ===
Accomplishment	Winner(s)	Date	Notes
JTO Tournament	Thunder Masami	March 28	Defeated Genta Yubari in the final to win.
JTO Girls Tournament	Azusa Inaba	March 28	Defeated Misa Kagura in the final to win.

=== Marigold ===
Accomplishment	Winner(s)	Date	Notes
New Year's Dream Rumble	Yuki Mashiro	January 3	Last eliminated Minami Yuuki to win.
Dream Star Grand Prix	Miku Aono	September 14	Defeated Victoria Yuzuki in the final to earn a Marigold World Championship match. She defeated Utami Hayashishita to win the title at Grand Destiny.
Twin Star Cup	Seri Yamaoka and Shinno	December 27	Defeated Darkness Revolution (Misa Matsui and Chiaki in the final to win.
Rookie of The Year Tournament	Seri Yamaoka	December 31	Defeated Shinno in the final to win.
New Year's Eve Rumble	Miku Aono	December 31	Last eliminated Chika Goto and Utami Hayashishita to win.

=== Marvelous ===
Accomplishment	Winner(s)	Date	Notes
One Day Tag Team Tournament	Sareee and Takumi Iroha	May 5	Defeated Veny and Ai Houzan in the final to earn an AAAW Tag Team Championship match. They defeated H2D (Ryo Mizunami and Sonoko Kato) to win the titles on May 20.

=== MLP ===
Accomplishment	Winner(s)	Date	Notes
MLP Women's Canadian Championship Tournament	Gisele Shaw	May 10	Defeated Kylie Rae in the final to become the inaugural champion.
MLP Canadian Championship Gauntlet for the Gold	Josh Alexander	May 10	Last eliminated Matt Cardona to become the inaugural champion.

=== MLW ===
Accomplishment	Winner(s)	Date	Notes
Gravity Gamble match	Mads Krule Krügger	January 11	Defeated Akira, Matthew Justice, Brett Ryan Gosselin, and Mr. Thomas to earn an MLW World Heavyweight Championship match at the time and place of his choosing. He successfully cashed in the contract at Fightland by defeating defending champion Matt Riddle and Donovan Dijak in a three-way match.
Battle Riot	Matt Riddle	April 5	Last eliminated Rob Van Dam to retain the MLW World Heavyweight Championship.
Opera Cup	Místico	November 20	Defeated Volador Jr. in the final to win the Opera Cup Trophy.

=== NJPW ===
Accomplishment	Winner(s)	Date	Notes
New Japan Ranbo	Hirooki Goto	January 4	Last eliminated Great-O-Khan to earn an IWGP World Heavyweight Championship match. He defeated Zack Sabre Jr. to win the title at The New Beginning in Osaka.
Lucha Gauntlet	Taiji Ishimori	January 5	Pinned El Desperado to win.
Torneo de Facciones	Los Ingobernables de Japon (Bushi and Titán)	February 26	Defeated Los Depredadores (Magnus and Rugido) in the final to win.
New Japan Cup	David Finlay	March 20	Defeated Shota Umino in the final to earn an IWGP World Heavyweight Championship match at Sakura Genesis. He challenged Hirooki Goto for the title at the event but was unsuccessful.
Best of the Super Juniors	Kosei Fujita	June 1	Defeated Yoh in the final to earn an IWGP Junior Heavyweight Championship match. He challenged El Desperado for the title on Night 9 of the New Japan Soul tour but was unsuccessful.
Tamashii Tag Team Championship Tournament	The Pretty Boys (Magic Mark and Pretty Richie)	July 4	Defeated Young Blood (Oskar Leube and Yuto Nakashima) in the final to become the inaugural champions.
G1 Climax	Konosuke Takeshita	August 17	Defeated Evil in the final to earn an IWGP World Heavyweight Championship match. He defeated Zack Sabre Jr. to win the title at King of Pro-Wrestling.
Super Junior Tag League	House of Torture (Douki and Sho)	November 2	Defeated Super Extremes (Taiji Ishimori and Robbie X) in the final to win. As the current IWGP Junior Heavyweight Tag Team Champions, they would have their next opponents chosen for them. They would defend their titles in a four-way tag team match against Super Extremes, Ichiban Sweet Boys (Robbie Eagles and Kosei Fujita), and El Desperado and Kuukai at New Year Dash!!. Ichiban Sweet Boys would go on to win the titles.
World Tag League	TMDK (Zack Sabre Jr. and Ryohei Oiwa)	December 14	Defeated Gabe Kidd and Yota Tsuji in the final to earn an IWGP Tag Team Championship match. Originally scheduled for Wrestle Kingdom 20, TMDK instead declared they would challenge Knock Out Brothers (Oskar and Yuto-Ice) for the titles the following night at New Year Dash!!. They were unsuccessful in capturing the titles.

=== NWA ===
Accomplishment	Winner(s)	Date	Notes
Dane Memorial Heavyweight Tournament	Colby Corino	March 22 (aired June 10)	Defeated Frank in the final to earn an NWA Worlds Heavyweight Championship match. He challenged for the title in a three-way match against champion Thom Latimer and Rhino at the Crockett Cup; Latimer would pin Corino to retain the title.
David Crockett Invitational Tag Team Battle Royal	The Slimeballz (Sage Chantz and Tommy Rant)	May 17 (aired July 29)	Last eliminated The JV Squad (Dalton McKenzie and Jack Vaughn) to earn the #12 seed in the Crockett Cup tournament.
Crockett Cup	The Immortals (Kratos and Odinson)	May 17 (aired August 9)	Defeated The Colóns (Eddie Colón and Orlando Colón) in the final to win the Crockett Cup Trophy and an NWA World Tag Team Championship match. They defeated Mike Knox and Trevor Murdoch to win the titles at the NWA 77th Anniversary Show.
King Bee	Damian Fenrir	August 16 (aired October 28)	Defeated Luke Kurtis, Spencer Slade, and The Lost (Crazzy Steve, Alex Misery, and Lev) to earn an NWA World Junior Heavyweight Championship match. He challenged Alex Taylor for the title at the September 5 NWA Powerrr taping, which aired on November 25, but was unsuccessful.
Austin Idol's Heartthrob Invitational Gauntlet	Tyler Stevens	August 16 (aired November 4)	Last eliminated Lockjaw Drake to earn a NWA National Heavyweight Championship match. He challenged Mike Mondo for the title at the September 5 NWA Powerrr taping, which aired on December 2, but was unsuccessful.

=== Osaka Pro ===
Accomplishment	Winner(s)	Date	Notes
Osaka Tag Festival	Tigers Mask and Aran Sano	February 24 (aired February 26)	Defeated Rogue Nation (Toru and Yasutaka Oosera) in the final to earn an Osaka Pro Wrestling Tag Team Championship match. They challenged Quiet Storm and Shigehiro Irie for the titles on March 9 but were unsuccessful.
Osaka Pro 4th Light Heavyweight Tournament	Suzaku	May 25 (aired May 27)	Defeated Ryuya Matsufusa in the final to earn an Osaka Light Heavyweight Championship match. He challenged Yasutaka Oosera for the title at Castle Festival but was unsuccessful.
Tennōzan	Ryuya Matsufusa	September 28	Defeated Kazuaki Mihara in the final to earn an Osaka Pro Wrestling Championship match. He defeated Toru to win the title at Excalibur.

=== OVW ===
Accomplishment	Winner(s)	Date	Notes
Nightmare Rumble (Women)	"HollyHood" Haley J	January 4	Last eliminated Angelica Risk to earn the Key of Opportunity for a championship match at the time and place of her choosing. She would invoke her opportunity to challenge J-Rod for the OVW Women's Championship on the January 23 episode of OVW TV, which aired on January 25, but was unsuccessful.
Nightmare Rumble (Men)	Doug Basham	January 4	Last eliminated Dustin Jackson to earn the Key of Opportunity for a championship match at the time and place of his choosing. He would invoke his opportunity later that night to enter the OVW National Heavyweight Championship match between champion EC3 and Ca$h Flo, where he would win the title.
OVW Heavyweight Championship Tournament.	Kal Herro	July 1 (aired July 3)	Defeated Crixus in the final to win the vacant title.
Nightmare Cup	Anthony Toatele and Dustin Jackson	September 28	Defeated Los Desafios (Jota Peso and Maximo Suave) in the final to win the vacant OVW Tag Team Championship.
Trick or Treat Battle Royal	Jack Vaughn	October 9	Last eliminated Mad Dog Martin to win.
Thanksgiving Turkey Reverse Battle Royal	TW3	November 22 (aired November 27)	Lost the match after Brian Hitt was last eliminated. As a result, he was forced to wear a turkey suit until he won a match.

=== Oz Academy ===
Accomplishment	Winner(s)	Date	Notes
New Year's Makenokori Majiten Tournament	Rina Yamashita	January 5	Defeated Zones in the final to win.

=== Progress ===
Accomplishment	Winner(s)	Date	Notes
Super Strong Style 16	Man Like DeReiss	May 5	Defeated Leon Slater in the final to earn a Progress World Championship match. He defeated Luke Jacobs in a Tables, Ladders, and Chairs match to win the title at Chapter 183: Hundred Volts.

=== RevPro ===
Accomplishment	Winner(s)	Date	Notes
Women's Revolution Gauntlet Match	Dani Luna	April 20	Pinned Emersyn Jayne to win.
Undisputed British Heavyweight Championship #1 Contender's Tournament	TK Cooper	May 25	Defeated Zozaya in the final to earn an Undisputed British Heavyweight Championship match. He challenged Michael Oku for the title at Revolution Rumble but was unsuccessful.
British J-Cup	Nino Bryant	June 14	Defeated Adam Priest, Cameron Khai, and Chris Ridgeway in the final, which was contested as a four-way elimination match, to earn Undisputed British Cruiserweight Championship match. He defeated Will Kaven to win the title at Revolution Rumble.
Revolution Rumble match	Sha Samuels	June 22	Last eliminated Liam Slater to earn an Undisputed British Heavyweight Championship match. He defeated Ricky Knight Jr. in a Title vs. Career match to win the title on Night 2 of the RevPro 13th Anniversary Show.
Undisputed British Women's Championship #1 Contender's Tournament	Safire Reed	July 13	Defeated Emersyn Jayne in the final to earn an Undisputed British Women's Championship match. She challenged Mercedes Moné for the title at Summer Sizzler but was unsuccessful.
Great British Tag League	Connor Mills and Jay Joshua	August 23	Defeated The Cowboy Way (1 Called Manders and Thomas Shire) in the final to earn an Undisputed British Tag Team Championship match. They challenged Young Guns (Luke Jacobs and Ethan Allen) for the titles at Live in Sheffield November but were unsuccessful.
Trios Grand Prix	Youngest Guns in Charge (Leon Slater, Luke Jacobs, and Ethan Allen)	September 21	Defeated Plan B (Iker Navarro, Junior Martinez, and Lozano) in the final to earn a title opportunity of their choosing.

=== REVOLVER ===
Accomplishment	Winner(s)	Date	Notes
Golden Ticket match	BDE	June 14	Defeated Bigg Pound, Jefferey John, Joe Alonzo, Juni Underwood, KJ Reynolds, and Ryan Matthias in a seven-way scramble to earn the "Golden Ticket" for a championship match at the time and place of his choosing. He invoked his ticket at Tales from The Ring 8, where he defeated A. J. Francis to win the REVOLVER Remix Championship.
REVOLVER Texas Championship Tournament	Brick Savage	June 28	Defeated JD Griffey in the final to become the inaugural champion.
Jerry Lynn Invitational	Rich Swann	August 9	Defeated Alan Angels in the final to win. Jerry Lynn served as the special guest referee.
Golden Ticket Rumble	Alan Angels	December 13	Last eliminated Jessicka Havok to earn the "Golden Ticket" for a championship match at the time and place of his choosing. He invoked his ticket to enter the Revolver Championship match between Myron Reed and Krule at Kross Hour, which was won by Krule.

=== ROH ===
Accomplishment	Winner(s)	Date	Notes
International Women's Cup	Momo Watanabe	January 5	Defeated Athena, Persephone, and Willow Nightingale in the final to earn a championship opportunity from the promotion of her choosing (AEW, ROH, CMLL, or Stardom). She chose to challenge Mercedes Moné for the AEW TBS Championship at Revolution but was unsuccessful.
ROH Women's Pure Championship Tournament	Deonna Purrazzo	December 5	Defeated Billie Starkz in the final to become the inaugural ROH Women's Pure Champion.

=== Stardom ===
Accomplishment	Winner(s)	Date	Notes
High Speed Battle Royal	Saki Kashima	January 3	Last eliminated Yuna Mizumori to earn a High Speed Championship match. She challenged Mei Seira for the title at New Year Stars on January 13 in a two out of three falls match, but was unsuccessful.
International Women's Cup	Momo Watanabe	January 5	Defeated Athena, Persephone, and Willow Nightingale in the final to earn a championship opportunity from the promotion of her choosing (AEW, ROH, CMLL, or Stardom). She chose to challenge Mercedes Moné for the AEW TBS Championship at Revolution but was unsuccessful.
Artist of Stardom Championship #1 Contender's Tournament	Sakuraramon (Yuna Mizumori, Aya Sakura, and Sayaka Kurara)	January 12	Defeated H.A.T.E. (Natsuko Tora, Fukigen Death, and Rina) to earn an Artist of Stardom Championship match the following night at New Year Stars on January 13. They challenged Cosmic Angels (Tam Nakano, Saori Anou, and Natsupoi) for the titles at the event but were unsuccessful.
New Year's Unit Competition League	Neo Genesis (AZM, Mei Seira, and Suzu Suzuki)	January 23	Defeated Empress Nexus Venus (Mina Shirakawa, Hanako, and Rian) in the final, which was contested as a single's Best of Five Series, to win.
New Blood Tag Team Title Challenger Determination One Day Tournament	Sakuradamon (Yuna Mizumori and Aya Sakura)	March 1	Defeated God's Eye (Nanami and Ranna Yagami) in the final to earn a New Blood Tag Team Championship match. They challenged Rice or Bread (Hanako and Waka Tsukiyama) for the titles at New Blood 20 but were unsuccessful.
Cinderella Tournament	Sayaka Kurara	March 15	Defeated Rina in the tournament final for a "wish" of her desire. Kurara wished for a World of Stardom Championship match, challenging Saya Kamitani for the title on May 11 at Stardom in Korakuen, but was unsuccessful.
Stardom Rumble	Hanako	April 27	Last eliminated Miyu Amasaki for a title match of her choosing. Hanako chose to challenge for the Wonder of Stardom Championship, challenging Starlight Kid for the title on May 21 at Nighter in Korakuen, but was unsuccessful.
5 Star Grand Prix	Momo Watanabe	August 23	Defeated AZM in the final to earn a World of Stardom Championship match. She challenged champion Saya Kamitani at Crimson Nightmare in a Winner Takes All match that was also for the Strong Women's Championship, but was unsuccessful.
Goddesses of Stardom Tag League	Sakurara (Aya Sakura and Sayaka Kurara)	November 30	Defeated Goddesses of Stardom Champions BMI2000 (Natsuko Tora and Ruaka) in the final to earn a title match. They will challenge BMI2000 for the titles at Dream Queendom.
Year-End Stardom Rumble	Rina	December 29	Last eliminated Miyu Amasaki to win.

=== Tenryu Project ===
Accomplishment	Winner(s)	Date	Notes
Tenryu Festival Mixed 1-Day Tournament	Koji Iwamoto and Chihiro Hashimoto	February 2	Defeated Jun Masaoka and Dash Chisako in the final to win.
Ryūkon Cup	Hikaru Sato	November 24	Defeated Daichi Hashimoto in the final to win.

=== TNA ===
Accomplishment	Winner(s)	Date	Notes
TNA Knockouts World Championship #1 Contender's Battle Royal	Savannah Evans	January 24 (aired February 6)	Last eliminated Xia Brookside to earn a TNA Knockouts World Championship match. She challenged Masha Slamovich for the title later that night, which aired on the February 13 episode of TNA Impact!, but was unsuccessful.
TNA International Championship Tournament	Steve Maclin	April 17	Defeated A. J. Francis and Eric Young in the final to become the inaugural champion.
8-4-1 match (Women)	Killer Kelly	June 7 (aired June 12)	Defeated Dani Luna, Indi Hartwell, Jody Threat, Rosemary, Tasha Steelz, Tessa Blanchard, and Xia Brookside to earn a TNA Knockouts World Championship match. She challenged Masha Slamovich for the title in a Russian chain match at the June 20 TNA Impact! taping, which aired on July 3, but was unsuccessful.
TNA Knockouts World Championship #1 Contender's Battle Royal	Ash by Elegance	June 20 (aired June 26)	Last eliminated Indi Hartwell and Tessa Blanchard to earn a TNA Knockouts World Championship match. She challenged Jacy Jayne for the title at the July 25 TNA Impact! taping, which aired on August 7, where she won by disqualification.
TNA Knockouts World Championship #1 Contender's Gauntlet match	Jody Threat	August 16 (aired August 21)	Last eliminated Indi Hartwell by disqualification to earn a TNA Knockouts World Championship match. However, due to the nature of her victory, the decision was voided. A three-way match between Threat, Hartwell, and Dani Luna took place on the September 4 episode of TNA Impact! to decide a proper contender, which was won by Hartwell. She challenge Kelani Jordan for the title at Bound for Glory but was unsuccessful.
TNA Knockouts World Championship Battle Royal	Léi Ying Lee and Kelani Jordan	September 26	The IInspiration (Cassie Lee and Jessie McKay) and The Elegance Brand (Heather be Elegance and M by Elegance) last eliminated each other. Jordan defeated Lee later in the night to win the vacant TNA Knockouts World Championship.
Call Your Shot Gauntlet	Nic Nemeth and Frankie Kazarian	October 12	Both men would pin each other. As a result, they were named co-winners of the Call Your Shot Trophy for a championship opportunity of their choosing. Kazarian would invoke his opportunity to win the TNA World Championship from Mike Santana on the November 13 live episode of TNA Impact!. Nemeth invoked his opportunity to win the TNA World Championship from Santana at Slammiversary.
TNA Turkey Bowl	Brian Myers	November 13 (aired November 27)	Defeated Eric Young, Mance Warner, Ryan Nemeth, Trey Miguel, and The Home Town Man to win. Since Nemeth was pinned, he was forced to wear a turkey suit.
TNA World Championship #1 Contender's Battle Royal	Bear Bronson	December 6 (aired December 18)	Last eliminated Eric Young to earn a TNA World Championship match. He challenged Frankie Kazarian for the title at the following day's TNA Impact! taping, which aired on January 1, 2026, but was unsuccessful.

=== Wave Pro ===
Accomplishment	Winner(s)	Date	Notes
Catch the Wave	Kohaku	July 21	Defeated Ranna Yagami and Haruka Umesaki in the final to win the title of "Nami Oona," ¥1,000,000, and a Wave Single Championship match. She defeated Saya Kamitani at the Wave 18th Anniversary Show to win the title.
Dual Shock Wave	SPiCEAP (Maika Ozaki and Tae Honma)	September 20	Defeated Tropikawild (Saki and Yuna Mizumori) in the final to retain the Wave Tag Team Championship.

=== West Coast Pro ===
Accomplishment	Winner(s)	Date	Notes
West Coast Pro Golden Gate Championship Tournament	Bret the Threat	April 4	Defeated Jiah Jewell in the final to become the inaugural champion.
Golden Gate Gauntlet match	Alpha Zo	July 26	Last eliminated Adrian Quest to win the vacant West Coast Pro Golden Gate Championship.
West Coast Cup	Andrew Cass	October 3	Defeated Danny Orion in the final to win

=== WWE ===
==== Raw and SmackDown ====
Accomplishment	Winner(s)	Date	Notes
WWE Women's Intercontinental Championship Tournament	Lyra Valkyria	January 13	Defeated Dakota Kai in the tournament final to become the inaugural WWE Women's Intercontinental Champion. The first round and semifinals occurred in December 2024.
WWE Tag Team Championship #1 Contender Tournament	Motor City Machine Guns (Chris Sabin and Alex Shelley)	January 17	Defeated Los Garza (Angel and Berto) in the final to earn a WWE Tag Team Championship match. They challenged #DIY (Johnny Gargano and Tommaso Ciampa) for the title at the Royal Rumble in a two out of three falls match, but were unsuccessful.
Royal Rumble match (Women)	Charlotte Flair	February 1	Last eliminated Roxanne Perez to earn a women's world championship match at WrestleMania 41. Flair from SmackDown chose to challenge for her own brand's WWE Women's Championship, but was defeated by Tiffany Stratton on Night 1 of the event.
Royal Rumble match (Men)	Jey Uso	February 1	Last eliminated John Cena to earn a men's world championship match at WrestleMania 41. Uso from Raw chose to challenge for his own brand's World Heavyweight Championship, defeating Gunther to win the title on Night 1 of the event.
WWE United States Championship #1 Contender Tournament	LA Knight	February 28	Defeated Jacob Fatu and Carmelo Hayes in the final to earn a WWE United States Championship match. He defeated Shinsuke Nakamura to win the title on the March 7 episode of SmackDown.
Elimination Chamber (Women)	Bianca Belair	March 6	Defeated Naomi, Bayley, Roxanne Perez, Alexa Bliss, and Liv Morgan, who she last eliminated, as a SmackDown wrestler to earn a match for Raw's Women's World Championship at WrestleMania 41. She challenged for the title in a triple threat match against champion Iyo Sky and Rhea Ripley on Night 2 of the event; Sky pinned Belair to retain the title.
Elimination Chamber (Men)	John Cena	March 6	Defeated Drew McIntyre, Damian Priest, Logan Paul, Seth "Freakin" Rollins, and CM Punk, who he last eliminated, as a free agent to earn a match for SmackDown's Undisputed WWE Championship at WrestleMania 41. He would defeat Cody Rhodes on Night 2 of the event to win the title.
WWE Women's Tag Team Championship #1 Contender's Gauntlet match	Bayley and Lyra Valkyria	April 11	Last eliminated The Secret Hervice (Piper Niven and Alba Fyre) to earn a WWE Women's Tag Team Championship match at WrestleMania 41. They were set to challenge The Judgment Day (Liv Morgan and Raquel Rodriguez) for the titles on Night 2 of the event, but before Night 1, Bayley was found attacked and injured backstage. Becky Lynch would replace her, and she and Valkyria would win the titles at the event.
André the Giant Memorial Battle Royal	Carmelo Hayes	April 18	Last eliminated Andrade to win the André the Giant Memorial Trophy
Money in the Bank ladder match (Women)	Naomi	June 7	Defeated Alexa Bliss, Giulia, Rhea Ripley, Roxanne Perez, and Stephanie Vaquer in a six-woman ladder match to earn a women's championship match contract. She cashed in during the Women's World Championship match between champion Iyo Sky and Rhea Ripley at Evolution to win the title. She was subsequently transferred to Raw as she was a SmackDown wrestler.
Money in the Bank ladder match (Men)	Seth Rollins	June 7	Defeated Andrade, El Grande Americano, LA Knight, Penta, and Solo Sikoa in a six-man ladder match to earn a men's championship match contract. He cashed in on and won the World Heavyweight Championship from CM Punk on Night 1 of SummerSlam.
Queen of the Ring tournament	Jade Cargill	June 28	Defeated Asuka in the final to be crowned Queen of the Ring and earn a women's world championship match at SummerSlam. She won as a SmackDown wrestler and challenged Tiffany Stratton for the WWE Women's Championship on Night 1 of the event but was unsuccessful.
King of the Ring tournament	Cody Rhodes	June 28	Defeated Randy Orton to be crowned King of the Ring and earn a men's world championship match at SummerSlam. He won as a SmackDown wrestler and defeated John Cena to win the Undisputed WWE Championship on Night 2 of the event in a Street Fight.
Evolution Battle Royal	Stephanie Vaquer	July 13	Last eliminated Lash Legend to earn a women's championship match. She won as a Raw wrestler and defeated Iyo Sky to win the vacant Women's World Championship at Wrestlepalooza.
World Heavyweight Championship #1 Contender's Gauntlet match	CM Punk	July 14	Last eliminated Bron Breakker to earn a World Heavyweight Championship match at SummerSlam. He defeated Gunther to win the title on Night 1 of the event.
WWE Women's Crown Jewel Championship	Stephanie Vaquer	October 11	Defeated SmackDown's WWE Women's Champion Tiffany Stratton to win the Women's Crown Jewel Championship. Vaquer was Raw's Women's World Champion.
WWE Crown Jewel Championship	Seth Rollins	October 11	Defeated SmackDown's Undisputed WWE Champion Cody Rhodes to win the Crown Jewel Championship. Rollins was Raw's World Heavyweight Champion.
World Heavyweight Championship Qualifying Battle Royal	Jey Uso	October 20	Last eliminated Dominik Mysterio to compete for the vacant World Heavyweight Championship. He faced CM Punk for the title at Saturday Night's Main Event XLI but was unsuccessful.
The Last Time Is Now Tournament	Gunther	December 5	Defeated LA Knight in the final to earn the right to face John Cena in his final match at Saturday Night's Main Event XLII. He would go on to defeat Cena at the event.

==== NXT ====
Accomplishment	Winner(s)	Date	Notes
NXT Tag Team Championship #1 Contender's Gauntlet match	Hank and Tank	April 15	Last eliminated Josh Briggs and Yoshiki Inamura to earn a NXT Tag Team Championship match at Stand & Deliver. They defeated Fraxiom (Nathan Frazer and Axiom) to win the titles at the event.
NXT Championship #1 Contender's Battle Royal	Myles Borne	June 6	Last eliminated Ethan Page and Shawn Spears to earn an NXT Championship match at Battleground. He challenged Oba Femi for the title at the event but was unsuccessful.
NXT Women's Championship Evolution Eliminator	Jordynne Grace	June 24	Defeated Jaida Parker, Lash Legend, and Izzi Dame in the final to earn an NXT Women's Championship match at Evolution. She challenged Jacy Jayne for the title at the event but was unsuccessful.
WWE Women's Speed Championship #1 Contender's Tournament	Lainey Reid	September 23	Defeated Candice LeRae in the final to earn a WWE Women's Speed Championship match at No Mercy. She was originally scheduled to challenge Sol Ruca for the title at the event, but sustained an injury during training. Jaida Parker would act as her replacement, but she was unsuccessful in capturing the title.
NXT Women's Championship #1 Contender's Battle Royal	Tatum Paxley	October 7 (aired October 14)	Izzi Dame would last eliminate Jordynne Grace and herself, which earned Paxley an NXT Women's Championship match at Halloween Havoc. She defeated Jacy Jayne to win the title at the event.
WWE Speed Championship #1 Contender's Tournament	Jasper Troy	October 28	Defeated Axiom in the final to earn a WWE Speed Championship match. He defeated El Grande Americano to win the title on the November 11 episode of NXT.
WWE Women's Speed Championship Tournament	Fallon Henley	November 18 (aired November 25)	Defeated Zaria in the final to win the vacant WWE Women's Speed Championship.
Iron Survivor Challenge (Women)	Kendal Grey	December 6	Defeated Jordynne Grace, Kelani Jordan, Lola Vice, and Sol Ruca to earn an NXT Women's Championship match at NXT: New Year's Evil. She challenged Jacy Jayne for the title at the event but was unsuccessful.
Iron Survivor Challenge (Men)	Je'Von Evans	December 6	Defeated Dion Lennox, Joe Hendry, Leon Slater, and Myles Borne to earn an NXT Championship match at NXT: New Year's Evil. However, Evans invoked his title opportunity to challenge Oba Femi for the title on the December 9 episode of NXT, but was unsuccessful.
WWE Speed Championship #1 Contender's Tournament	Tavion Heights	December 17 (aired December 30)	Defeated Lexis King in the final to earn a WWE Speed Championship match. He challenged Jasper Troy for the title on the January 13, 2026, episode of NXT, but was unsuccessful.

==== WWE Speed ====
Accomplishment	Winner(s)	Date	Notes
WWE Speed Championship #1 Contender's Tournament	Chad Gable	January 24 (aired January 29)	Defeated Chris Sabin in the final to earn a WWE Speed Championship match. He challenged Dragon Lee for the title at the January 31 WWE Speed taping, which aired on February 1, but was unsuccessful.
WWE Women's Speed Championship #1 Contender's Tournament	Zoey Stark	February 14 (aired February 19)	Defeated Shotzi to earn a WWE Women's Speed Championship match. She challenged Candice LeRae for the title at the February 21 WWE Speed taping, which aired on February 26, but it ended in a time limit draw.
WWE Speed Championship #1 Contender's Tournament	Ivar	March 7 (aired March 12)	Defeated Dominik Mysterio to earn a WWE Speed Championship match. He challenged Dragon Lee for the title at the March 7 WWE Speed taping, which aired on March 19, but was unsuccessful.
WWE Women's Speed Championship #1 Contender's Tournament	Sol Ruca	April 4 (aired April 9)	Defeated Michin in the final to earn a WWE Women's Speed Championship match. She defeated Candice LeRae to win the title on the April 11 WWE Speed taping, which aired on April 16.
WWE Speed Championship #1 Contender's Tournament	El Grande Americano	April 25 (aired April 30)	Defeated Alex Shelley in the final to earn a WWE Speed Championship match. He defeated Dragon Lee to win the title on the May 5 WWE Speed taping, which aired on May 7.
WWE Women's Speed Championship #1 Contender's Tournament	Ivy Nile	May 16 (aired May 21)	Defeeated Kelani Jordan to earn a WWE Women's Speed Championship match. She challenged Sol Ruca for the title at the May 23 WWE Speed taping, which aired on May 28, but was unsuccessful.
WWE Speed Championship #1 Contender's Tournament	Berto	June 6 (aired June 11)	Defeated Noam Dar in the final to earn a WWE Speed Championship match. He challenged El Grande Americano for the title at the June 17 WWE Speed taping, which aired on June 18, but was unsuccessful.
WWE Women's Speed Championship #1 Contender's Tournament	Alba Fyre	June 30 (aired July 2)	Defeated Thea Hail in the final to earn a WWE Women's Speed Championship match. She challenged Sol Ruca for the title on the July 8 WWE Speed taping, which aired the following day, but was unsuccessful.

==== WWE ID ====
Accomplishment	Winner(s)	Date	Notes
WWE Women's ID Championship Tournament	Kylie Rae	August 1	Defeated Zara Zakher and Zayda Steel in the final to become the inaugural WWE Women's ID Champion.
WWE ID Championship Tournament	Cappuccino Jones	August 1	Defeated Jack Cartwheel in the final to become the inaugural WWE ID Champion.

=== wXw ===
Accomplishment	Winner(s)	Date	Notes
Road to 16 Carat Gold Tournament	Bobby Gunns	February 8	Defeated Fast Time Moodo and Stephanie Maze in the final to earn a spot in the 16 Carat Gold Tournament.
Ambition 16	Thomas Shire	March 8	Defeated Danny Jones in the final to win.
16 Carat Gold Tournament	1 Called Manders	March 9	Defeated Ahura in the final to earn a wXw Unified World Wrestling Championship match. He defeated Elijah Blum at We Love Wrestling: 16 Carat Gold Revenge to win the vacant title.
Shortcut to the Top match	Peter Tihanyi	August 16	Last eliminated Nick Schreier to earn a wXw Unified World Wrestling Championship match. He defeated 1 Called Manders to win the title on the third show of Pro-Wrestling Grand Prix.
King of the Catcher Tournament	Ahura	September 28	Defeated Elijah Blum in the final to earn a wXw Unified World Wrestling Championship match. He challenged Peter Tihanyi for the title at wXw 25th Anniversary but was unsuccessful.
World Tag Team Tournament	Greedy Souls (Brendan White and Danny Jones)	September 28	Defeated The Grind (Laurance Roman and Nick Schreier) in the final to earn a wXw World Tag Team Championship match. They defeated Planet Gojirah (Robert Dreissker and Marc Empire) to win the titles on the Leipzig show of the wXw 25th Anniversary Tour.
Femmes Fatales	Safire Reed	September 28	Defeated Anita Vaughan in the final to win.

=== Zero1 ===
Accomplishment	Winner(s)	Date	Notes
Bright Future Openweight Championship Tournament	Satsuki Nagao	April 5	Defeated Tsugutaka Sato in the final to become the inaugural champion.
Fire Festival	Hayabusa	July 4	Defeated Chris Vice in the final to win the Fire Sword.
Tenkaichi Junior	Veny	October 17	Defeated Yuki Toki in the final to win.
Furinkazan Tag Tournament	Junya Matsunaga and Tsugutaka Sato	December 27	Defeated Jinsei Shinzaki and Hayabusa in the final to win the vacant Intercontinental Tag Team Championship.

== Title changes ==
=== 2AW ===
2AW Openweight Championship
Incoming champion – Ayato Yoshida
Date	Winner	Event/Show	Note(s)
April 27 (aired May 1)	Naka Shuma	Grand Slam in TKP Garden City Chiba	
June 22 (aired July 6)	Daiju Wakamatsu	6th Anniversary Grand Slam in TKP Garden City Chiba	
October 12 (aired October 19)	Takuro Niki	Grand Slam in Korakuen Hall	

2AW Tag Team Championship
Incoming champions – Buttobe Missile Kickers (Daiju Wakamatsu and Taishi Takizawa)
Date	Winner	Event/Show	Note(s)
March 23	Makoto Oishi and Shiori Asahi	Grand Slam in Korakuen Hall	
June 22 (aired July 6)	Koen (Takuro Niki and Tatsuya Hanami)	6th Anniversary Grand Slam in TKP Garden City Chiba	
July 21	MJ2 (Kengo Mashimo and Kyu Mogami)	Grand Slam in 2AW Square; Night 2	

=== AAA ===
AAA Mega Championship
Incoming champion – Alberto El Patrón
Date	Winner	Event/Show	Note(s)
May 31	El Hijo del Vikingo	Alianzas	
September 12	Dominik Mysterio	Worlds Collide: Las Vegas	Co-promoted with WWE.

AAA World Cruiserweight Championship
Incoming champion – Laredo Kid
No title changes.

AAA Latin American Championship
Incoming champion – El Mesías
Date	Winner	Event/Show	Note(s)
August 16	El Hijo de Dr. Wagner Jr.	Triplemanía XXXIII	

AAA Reina de Reinas Championship
Incoming champion – Flammer
No title changes.

AAA World Tag Team Championship
Incoming champions – Team India (Satnam Singh and Raj Dhesi)
Date	Winner	Event/Show	Note(s)
March 19	Vacated	–	The titles were vacated after Team India didn't defend the titles.
March 22	Nueva Generación Dinamita (Sansón and Forastero)	Rey de Reyes	Defeated Laredo Kid and Pagano, and Jeff Jarrett and Sam Adonis in a three-way tag team match to win the vacant titles.
June 15	Los Garza (Angel and Berto)	Triplemanía Regia III	This was a four-way tag team match also involving Psycho Clown and Pagano, and The Nemeth Brothers (Nic Nemeth and Ryan Nemeth).
August 16	Pagano and Psycho Clown	Triplemanía XXXIII	This was a Street Fight.

AAA World Mixed Tag Team Championship
Incoming champions – Mr. Iguana and La Hiedra
Date	Winner	Event/Show	Note(s)
November 2	Ethan Page and Chelsea Green	Alianzas: Day of the Dead	

AAA World Trios Championship
Incoming champions – Los Psycho Circus (Psycho Clown, Murder Clown, Panic Clown, and Dave the Clown)
No title changes.

=== AAW ===
AAW Heavyweight Championship
Incoming champion – Matt Riddle
Date	Winner	Event/Show	Note(s)
January 31	Ren Jones	Chi-Town Rumble	
August 9	Trevor Lee	Take No Prisoners	This was a three-way match also involving Rafael Quintero.

AAW Heritage Championship
Incoming champion – Joe Alonzo
Date	Winner	Event/Show	Note(s)
February 28	Robert Anthony	Epic: The 21 Year Anniversary Event	
September 13	Isaiah Moore	A Bond of Hate	

AAW Tag Team Championship
Incoming champion – The Hellhounds (Russ Jones and Schaff)
Date	Winner	Event/Show	Note(s)
June 28	Aaron Roberts and Joey Avalon	Crush & Destroy	
October 18	The Good Brothers (Doc Gallows and Karl Anderson)	Defining Moment	
December 26	The Hellhounds (Russ Jones and Schaff)	Windy City Classic XX	

AAW Women's Championship
Incoming champion – Sierra
Date	Winner	Event/Show	Note(s)
January 31	Maggie Lee	Chi-Town Rumble	This was a street fight.

=== AEW ===
AEW World Championship
Incoming champion – Jon Moxley
Date	Winner	Event/Show	Note(s)
July 12	"Hangman" Adam Page	All In	This was a Texas Deathmatch.
November 22	Samoa Joe	Full Gear	This was a Steel Cage match.
December 27	MJF	Worlds End	This was a four-way match also involving Swerve Strickland and "Hangman" Adam Page.

AEW Women's World Championship
Incoming champion – Mariah May
Date	Winner	Event/Show	Note(s)
February 15	"Timeless" Toni Storm	Grand Slam Australia	
September 20	Kris Statlander	All Out	This was a four-way match also involving Jamie Hayter and Thekla.

AEW International Championship
Incoming champion – Konosuke Takeshita
Date	Winner	Event/Show	Note(s)
March 9	Kenny Omega	Revolution	
July 12	Kazuchika Okada	All In	This was a Winner Takes All Unification match, in which Okada defended the AEW Continental Championship, to also become the inaugural AEW Unified Champion, but with the titles maintaining their individual images.

AEW Continental Championship
Incoming champion – Kazuchika Okada
Date	Winner	Event/Show	Note(s)
December 27	Jon Moxley	Worlds End	This was the Continental Classic final.

AEW Unified Championship
(Title created)
Date	Winner	Event/Show	Note(s)
July 12	Kazuchika Okada	All In	Defeated AEW International Champion Kenny Omega in a Winner Takes All Unification match, in which Okada defended the AEW Continental Championship, to become the inaugural champion, but with the titles maintaining their individual images.
December 27	Vacated	Worlds End	The title went inactive after Okada lost the AEW Continental Championship to Jon Moxley in the final of the Continental Classic.

AEW National Championship
(Title created)
Date	Winner	Event/Show	Note(s)
November 22	Ricochet	Full Gear	This was a 12-man Casino Gauntlet match in which Ricochet pinned Kevin Knight to become the inaugural champion.

AEW TNT Championship
Incoming champion – Daniel Garcia
Date	Winner	Event/Show	Note(s)
April 6	Adam Cole	Dynasty	
July 12	Vacated	All In; Zero Hour	Adam Cole, who was originally scheduled to defend the title against Kyle Fletcher on the main card, relinquished the title due to injury and ruled out of action indefinitely.
July 12	Dustin Rhodes	All In	Defeated Kyle Fletcher, Daniel Garcia, and Sammy Guevara in a four-way match to win the vacant title.
July 31	Kyle Fletcher	Collision	This was a Chicago Street Fight.
November 22	Mark Briscoe	Full Gear	This was a No Disqualification match where if Briscoe had lost, he would have been forced to join The Don Callis Family.

AEW TBS Championship
Incoming champion – Mercedes Moné
Date	Winner	Event/Show	Note(s)
December 31	Willow Nightingale	Dynamite: New Year's Smash	

AEW World Tag Team Championship
Incoming champions – Private Party (Isiah Kassidy and Marq Quen)
Date	Winner	Event/Show	Note(s)
January 22	The Hurt Syndicate (Bobby Lashley and Shelton Benjamin)	Dynamite	
August 24	Brodido (Brody King and Bandido)	Forbidden Door	This was a three-way tag team match also involving FTR (Dax Harwood and Cash Wheeler).
November 22	FTR (Dax Harwood and Cash Wheeler)	Full Gear	

AEW Women's World Tag Team Championship
(Title created)
Date	Winner	Event/Show	Note(s)
December 10	Babes of Wrath (Harley Cameron and Willow Nightingale)	Dynamite: Winter Is Coming	Defeated The Timeless Love Bombs ("Timeless" Toni Storm and Mina Shirakawa) in a tournament final to become the inaugural champions.

AEW World Trios Championship
Incoming champions – Death Riders (Claudio Castagnoli, Wheeler Yuta, and Pac)
Date	Winner	Event/Show	Note(s)
April 16	The Opps (Samoa Joe, Powerhouse Hobbs, and Katsuyori Shibata)	Dynamite: Spring Breakin	Due to a legitimate injury, Death Riders stablemate Jon Moxley filled in as interim title holder in place of Pac.

=== AIW ===
AIW Absolute Championship
Incoming champion – Chuck Stone
Date	Winner	Event/Show	Note(s)
January 17	Eric Turner	Concepts of a Plan	
July 18	Chuck Stone	Absolution XVIII	
December 27	Sam Holloway	Malice at The Palace	

AIW Intense Championship
Incoming champion – Wes Barkley
Date	Winner	Event/Show	Note(s)
July 18	Isaiah Broner	Absolution XVIII	

AIW Tag Team Championship
Incoming champions – PME (Marino Tenaglia and Philly Collins)
Date	Winner	Event/Show	Note(s)
September 20	Derek Dillinger and Tyson Riggs	The JT Lightning Invitational Tournament; Show 2	

=== AJPW ===
Triple Crown Heavyweight Championship
Incoming champion – Jun Saito
Date	Winner	Event/Show	Note(s)
September 23	Kento Miyahara	Giant Dream	

World Junior Heavyweight Championship
Incoming champion – Naruki Doi
Date	Winner	Event/Show	Note(s)
January 26	Musashi	New Year Wars; Night 3	
May 18	Seiki Yoshioka	Champion Carnival; Night 14	
August 10	Atsuki Aoyagi	Nettou Summer Action Wars; Night 2	

Gaora TV Championship
Incoming champion – Yuko Miyamoto
Date	Winner	Event/Show	Note(s)
June 15	Takashi	Super Power Series; Night 3	
September 23	Kuroshio Tokyo Japan	Giant Dream	This was a nine-man battle royal also involving Aizawa No. 1, Hokuto Omori, Kikutaro, Kumaarashi, Naruki Doi, Seigo Tachibana and Senor Saito. Kuroshio last eliminated Omori to win. Kuroshio was previously known as Jiro Kuroshio.
October 28	Shotaro Ashino	Hokkaido Dynamite Series; Night 3	

World Tag Team Championship
Incoming champions – Saito Brothers (Jun Saito and Rei Saito)
Date	Winner	Event/Show	Note(s)
March 9	Business Tag Team (Kento Miyahara and Yuma Aoyagi)	Giant Power Series; Tag 1	
August 1	Baka No Jidai (Hideki Suzuki and Kengo Mashimo)	Nettou Summer Action Wars; Night 1	
September 23	Havoc (Oddyssey and Xyon)	Giant Dream	

All Asia Tag Team Championship
Incoming champions – ELPIDA (Yuma Anzai and Rising Hayato)
Date	Winner	Event/Show	Note(s)
June 15	Atsuki Aoyagi and Yuma Aoyagi	Super Power Series; Night 3	
September 15	Musashi and Seiki Yoshioka	Royal Road Tournament; Night 3	
December 31	Gajadokuro (Ishin and Yoshiki Kato)	New Year's Eve	

AJPW TV Six-Man Tag Team Championship
Incoming champions – Hokuto-gun (Hokuto Omori, Kumaarashi, and Cyrus)
Date	Winner	Event/Show	Note(s)
January 2	Baka no Jidai (Fuminori Abe, Hikaru Sato, and Yuma Aoyagi)	New Year Wars; Night 1	
May 18	Hokuto-gun (Hokuto Omori, Takashi Yoshida, and Kuma Arashi)	Champion Carnival; Night 14	

=== Basara ===
Union Max Championship
Incoming champion – Masato Kamino
Date	Winner	Event/Show	Note(s)
March 2	Ryota Nakatsu	Basara 272: Oji no Kitsune 27	
December 28	Shuji Ishikawa	Basara 296: Utage	

Iron Fist Tag Team Championship
Incoming champion – Astronauts (Fuminori Abe and Takuya Nomura)
Date	Winner	Event/Show	Note(s)
February 21	Hyakushou Ikki (Fuma and Ryuichi Sekine)	Basara 271: Utage	
August 3	MJ2 (Kengo Mashimo and Ayumu Honda)	Basara 285: Masho Sakushin	
December 27	Daiki Shimomura and Takumi Tsukamoto	Basara 296: Takagari 31	

=== BJW ===
BJW Deathmatch Heavyweight Championship
Incoming champion – Hideyoshi Kamitani
Date	Winner	Event/Show	Note(s)
March 29	Akira	BJW	This was a Tokyo SOS Crazy Monster Deathmatch.
August 24	Yusaku Ito	Death Mania XIII ~ Back to Inazawa	This was an Under the Sea Deathmatch.

BJW World Strong Heavyweight Championship
Incoming champion – Hideyoshi Kamitani
Date	Winner	Event/Show	Note(s)
May 5	Daichi Hashimoto	BJW 30th Anniversary ~ Dainichi Spirit	
October 13	So Daimonji	New Standard Big "B" ~ I & believe	

BJW Junior Heavyweight Championship
Incoming champion – Ikuto Hidaka
Date	Winner	Event/Show	Note(s)
May 5	Kosuke Sato	BJW 30th Anniversary ~ Dainichi Spirit	

BJW Tag Team Championship
Incoming champions – Baka Gaijin (Dale Patricks and Madman Pondo)
Date	Winner	Event/Show	Note(s)
April 28	W-Daichan (Daisuke Sekimoto and So Daimonji)	BJW	
May 15	Baka Gaijin (Dale Patricks and Madman Pondo)	BJW	
June 13	Vacated	–	Vacated due to Pondo's unavoidable schedule change after returning to the United States.
June 22	Kankuro Hoshino and Ryuji Ito	Ikkitousen Strong Climb Final	Defeated Akira and Dale Patricks in a Concrete Block Deathmatch to win the vacant titles.
December 30	Kazumi Kikuta and Toru Sugiura	BJW	This was a Fluorescent Lighttubes Alpha Death Match.

Yokohama Shopping Street 6-Man Tag Team Championship
Incoming champions – Daisuke Sekimoto, Kazumi Kikuta, and Yasufumi Nakanoue
Date	Winner	Event/Show	Note(s)
January 17	Abdullah Kobayashi, Kankuro Hoshino, and Ryuji Ito	Kanagawa Start:Dash!!	

UWA World Tag Team Championship
Incoming champions – Hideyoshi Kamitani and Isami Kodaka
Date	Winner	Event/Show	Note(s)
September 23	Andy Wu and Yasufumi Nakanoue	Osaka Surprise 81 ~ A Comeback in 2025	

=== BZW ===
BZW Championship
Incoming champion – Joseph Fenech Jr.
Date	Winner	Event/Show	Note(s)
November 2	Jacob Vadocq	Deadline	

BZW Hardcore Championship
Incoming champion – Jacob Vadocq
Date	Winner	Event/Show	Note(s)
January 25	Big F'n Joe	BZW/GCW Enter the Zone	Co-promoted with Game Changer Wrestling (GCW). This was a three-way match also involving Cole Radrick.
July 7	Georges Balzac	Les Jeux sont Faits	

BZW Tag Team Championship
Incoming champion – Mao and Yoshihiko
Date	Winner	Event/Show	Note(s)

=== CF ===
– DDT Pro-Wrestling
– Pro Wrestling Noah
– Tokyo Joshi Pro-Wrestling

==== DDT ====
KO-D Openweight Championship
Incoming champion – Chris Brookes
Date	Winner	Event/Show	Note(s)
June 29	Kazusada Higuchi	King of Kings	
August 31	Yuki Ueno	Wrestle Peter Pan; Night 2	
August 31	Kazuki Hirata	Wrestle Peter Pan; Night 2	This was Hirata's Right to Challenge Anytime Anywhere cash-in match.
September 28	Yuki Ueno	Dramatic Infinity	This was Ueno's Right to Challenge Anytime Anywhere cash-in match.

DDT Universal Championship
Incoming champion – Gringo Loco
Date	Winner	Event/Show	Note(s)
January 26	Yuki Ueno	New Year, New Hero	
March 20	Minoru Suzuki	Judgement	
November 3	Yuki Ueno	Ultimate Party	This was a Winner Takes All match also for Ueno's KO-D Openweight Championship.

DDT Extreme Championship
Incoming champion – Danshoku Dino
Date	Winner	Event/Show	Note(s)
March 20	Super Sasadango Machine	Judgement	This was a Loser Joins DDT match with Amon Tsurumi as a special observer.
June 15 (aired June 18)	To-y	Echigo Power Slam	This was a two-out-of-three falls deathmatch. To-y won 2–1.

KO-D Tag Team Championship
Incoming champions – The37Kamiina (Mao and To-y)
Date	Winner	Event/Show	Note(s)
March 20	Astronauts (Fuminori Abe and Takuya Nomura)	Judgement	
June 29	The Apex (Yuki Iino and Yukio Naya)	King of Kings	
November 3	Strange Love Connenction (Mao and Kanon)	Ultimate Party	This was a three-way match also involving Team 200 kg (Chihiro Hashimoto and Yuu).

KO-D 6-Man Tag Team Championship
Incoming champions – Damnation T.A. (Daisuke Sasaki, Kanon, and MJ Paul)
Date	Winner	Event/Show	Note(s)
February 25	Vacated	Next Generation: Kisaragi Roman	The titles were vacated after Kanon's expulsion from Damnation T.A.
March 20	NωA Jr. (Shunma Katsumata, Yuni, and Kazuma Sumi)	Judgement	Defeated Harimau (Kazusada Higuchi, Ryota Nakatsu and Yuki Ishida) to win the vacant titles.
April 27 (aired April 29)	Damnation T.A. (Daisuke Sasaki, Hideki Okatani, and Ilusion)	Sapporo Night Crush	
September 10	Vacated	N/A	The title was vacated after Daisuke Sasaki suffered a fractured rib at Wrestle Peter Pan.
September 28	Kaisei Takechi and The 37Kamiina (To-y and Yuki Ueno)	Dramatic Infinity	Defeated Damnation T.A. (MJ Paul, Hideki Okatani and Ilusion) to win the vacant titles.

KO-D 10-Man Tag Team Championship
Incoming champions – Keigo Nakamura, Yuki Ishida, To-y, Kazuma Sumi, and Yuya Koroku
Date	Winner	Event/Show	Note(s)
December 28 (aired December 31)	Damnation T.A. (Daisuke Sasaki, Demus, Hideki Okatani, MJ Paul and Ilusion)	Year End Dramatic Parade	Daichi Sato replaced Keigo Nakamura.

O-40 Championship
Incoming champion – Toru Owashi
Date	Winner	Event/Show	Note(s)
April 23	Antonio Honda	Haru no Ken Festival	
November 22	Daisuke Sasaki	Shout Your Love in Hama's Ring!	

World Ōmori Championship
Incoming champion – Masahiro Takanashi
Date	Winner	Event/Show	Note(s)
November 16 (airing November 21)	Kazuki Hirata	UTAN Festa	Lineal champion Masahiro Takanashi had suffered cervical injuries on March 20 and was unable to defend the title. Hirata defeated Antonio Honda to become the interim champion.

Ironman Heavymetalweight Championship
Incoming champion – Sanshiro Takagi
Date	Winner	Event/Show	Note(s)
January 3	Chris Harrington	New Year☆Dramatic Parade: Answer Will Be Given in a Year	Senior Vice President of Business Strategy at All Elite Wrestling (AEW). Pinned Takagi backstage after spraying him with hair spray during a selfie.
January 4	Bryce Remsburg	Tokyo Joshi Pro '25	All Elite Wrestling (AEW) referee. This was a Tokyo Joshi Pro-Wrestling (TJPW) event.
January 4	Poison Julie Sawada	Tokyo Joshi Pro '25	
January 18	Tetsu Inada	The Fortune Battle	Voice actor.
February 2	Tomoyuki Kurokawa	–	
February 2	Towel	–	
February 2	Tetsu Inada	–	Voice actor.
February 4 (NET)	Shun Ebato	Say You to Yo Asobi	Assistant director of Abema. Pre-recorded between February 4–14; aired between February 24–28.
February N/A	Tetsu Inada	Say You to Yo Asobi	Voice actor. Pre-recorded between February 4–14; aired between February 24–28.
February N/A	Tomoko Kaneda	Say You to Yo Asobi	Voice actress. Won the title in a game of janken. Pre-recorded between February 4–14; aired between February 24–28.
February N/A	Tetsu Inada	Say You to Yo Asobi	Voice actor. Won the title in a balloon-blowing contest. Pre-recorded between February 4–14; aired between February 24–28.
February N/A	Tasuku Hatanaka	Say You to Yo Asobi	Voice actor. Won the title in a pencil balancing contest. Pre-recorded between February 4–14; aired between February 24–28.
February N/A	Tomoko Kaneda	Say You to Yo Asobi	Voice actress. Won the title in a quick fart contest. Pre-recorded between February 4–14; aired between February 24–28.
February N/A	Tetsu Inada	Say You to Yo Asobi	Voice actor. Won the title in a loud noise contest. Pre-recorded between February 4–14; aired between February 24–28.
February N/A	Tasuku Hatanaka	Say You to Yo Asobi	Voice actor. Won the title in a karaoke contest. Pre-recorded between February 4–14; aired between February 24–28.
February N/A	Tomoko Kaneda	Say You to Yo Asobi	Voice actress. Won the title in a fast cola drinking contest. Pre-recorded between February 4–14; aired between February 24–28.
February N/A	Sobie	Say You to Yo Asobi	The program's mascot. Won the title in a back sumo match. Pre-recorded between February 4–14; aired between February 24–28.
February N/A	Tasuku Hatanaka	Say You to Yo Asobi	Voice actor. Won the title in a side-step stamina test. Pre-recorded between February 4–14; aired between February 24–28.
February N/A	Tetsu Inada	Say You to Yo Asobi	Voice actor. Won the title in a fast cola drinking contest. Pre-recorded between February 4–14; aired between February 24–28.
February N/A	Tasuku Hatanaka	Say You to Yo Asobi	Voice actor. Won the title in a skipping rope contest. Pre-recorded between February 4–14; aired between February 24–28.
February N/A	Tomoko Kaneda	Say You to Yo Asobi	Voice actress. Won the title in a back sumo match. Pre-recorded between February 4–14; aired between February 24–28.
February N/A	Tetsu Inada	Say You to Yo Asobi	Voice actor. Won the title in a golden ball lifting contest. Pre-recorded between February 4–14; aired between February 24–28.
February N/A	Tomoko Kaneda	Say You to Yo Asobi	Voice actress. Won the title in a quick fart contest. Pre-recorded between February 4–14; aired between February 24–28.
February N/A	Tetsu Inada	Say You to Yo Asobi	Voice actor. Won the title in a balloon-blowing contest. Pre-recorded between February 4–14; aired between February 24–28.
February N/A	Shun Ebato	Say You to Yo Asobi	Assistant director of Abema. Won the title in a fast cola drinking contest. Pre-recorded between February 4–14; aired between February 24–28.
February 14 (NLT)	Tetsu Inada	Say You to Yo Asobi	Voice actor. Pre-recorded between February 4–14; aired between February 24–28.
February 15 (aired February 19)	Raku	TJPW Shinkansen Joshi Pro Wrestling	This was a Tokyo Joshi Pro-Wrestling (TJPW) event on board the Shinkansen; title changed hands somewhere between Nagoya and Shin-Ōsaka Station.
February 15 (aired February 18)	Miyu Yamashita	TJPW Winter Fes. [West]	This was a Tokyo Joshi Pro-Wrestling (TJPW) event. This was an eight-woman tag team match where Yamashita teamed with Maki Itoh, Yuki Arai, and Max the Impaler to defeat Raku, Miu Watanabe, Mizuki, and Aja Kong. Yamashita pinned Raku to win the match and the title.
February 15 (aired February 18)	Mecha fist	TJPW Winter Fes. [West]	Sanshiro Takagi's weapon. Tetsu Inada threw the fist at Yamashita, which covered her and subsequently won the title.
February 15 (aired February 18)	Tetsu Inada	TJPW Winter Fes. [West]	Voice actor.
February 23	Shunma Katsumata	Next Generation	Pinned Inada backstage.
March 2	To-y	To-y Thanksgiving Season 2	
March 6	Shunma Katsumata	Meet & Greet Fight in March	
April 1	Yuni	No Spoilers Event Vol. 3 in Ueano	This was a six-man tag team match pitting NωA (Mao and Makoto Oishi) against NωA Jr. (Yuni and Kazuma Sumi), with Katsumata teaming with both teams at the same time. Yuni pinned Katsumata to win the match and the title.
April 3	Kazuma Sumi	Meet & Greet Fight in April	
April 3	Yuni	Meet & Greet Fight in April	
April 3	Shunma Katsumata	Meet & Greet Fight in April	
April 12 (aired April 15)	Kazuki Hirata	Mentai Wars	
April 19	Poko-tan	Las Vegas Series ~Jitsugesu~	Mascot of DDT. Pinned Hirata after hitting him with a spanner.
April 19	Masanori Kishikawa and Mizuki Takashima	Las Vegas Series ~Jitsugesu~	Junior priests at Kanda Shrine. Mikoshi, the mascot for Kanda Shrine, attacked Poko-tan. Kishikawa and Takashima simultaneously pined Poko-tan to win the title.
April 20	Kazuki Hirata	Las Vegas Series ~Neshin~	Hirata pinned both Kishikawa and Takashima to win the title.
April 20	Sumire Uesaka	Las Vegas Series ~Neshin~	Voice actress. Tetsu Inada threw Poko-tan's head at Hirata in the locker room. Uesaka pinned Hirata to win the title.
April 20	Poko-tan's head	Las Vegas Series ~Neshin~	Head of the mascot of DDT. Poko-tan placed its head over Uesaka's, who was scared and tapped out. Referee Yukinori Matsui judged the head as the new champion.
May 31	Poison Sawada Julie	Dramatic Dream Takashimaya Vol. 3	
June 29	Sanshiro Takagi	King of Kings	
July 5	Riara	TJPW I Can't Wait Until Summer Sun Princess '25	This was a Tokyo Joshi Pro-Wrestling (TJPW) event. The title change took place backstage.
July 5	Yoshiko Hasegawa	TJPW I Can't Wait Until Summer Sun Princess '25	This was a tag team match where Hasegawa teamed with Kaya Toribami to defeat Riara and Himawari. Hasegawa submitted Riara to win the match and the title.
July 8	Suzume	TJPW Yoshiko Hasegawa Graduation - NonfictioN	This was a Tokyo Joshi Pro-Wrestling (TJPW) event where Hasegawa defended the title in a 27-on-1 handicap match, which also represented her official retirement bout. Suzume pinned Hasegawa to win the title.
July 8	Mizuki	TJPW Yoshiko Hasegawa Graduation - NonfictioN	Pinned Suzume during the same bout.
July 8	Miu Watanabe	TJPW Yoshiko Hasegawa Graduation - NonfictioN	Pinned Mizuki during the same bout.
July 8	Pico Pico Hammer	TJPW Yoshiko Hasegawa Graduation - NonfictioN	A plastic hammer decoration toy. Raku knocked both herself and Mizuki out, and the hammer fell on top of Mizuki. The title change occurred after the event concluded.
July 8	Sanshiro Takagi	TJPW Yoshiko Hasegawa Graduation - NonfictioN	Pinned the hammer decoration toy backstage after kicking it off the referee's hand. The title change occurred after the event concluded.
July 20	Kazuma Sumi	Handmade in Japan FES	
July 22	Yuni	–	Took place at the DDT Dojo. NωA Jr. (Yuni, Sumi, and Shunma Katsumata) were training when Yuni pinned Sumi to win the title.
July 26	Kazuma Sumi	Galafest DASH!!	Took place at the Galafest music festival.
July 26	Shunma Katsumata	Galafest DASH!!	Took place at the Galafest music festival.
July 26	Reni Takagi	Galafest DASH!!	Member of idol group Momoiro Clover Z. Took place at the Galafest music festival.
July 26	Juri Suzue	Galafest DASH!!	Star Planet trainee. Took place at the Galafest music festival.
August 23	Ram Kaicho	TJPW Tokyo Princess Cup; Night 5	This was a Tokyo Joshi Pro-Wrestling (TJPW) event. Pinned Suzue before an eight-woman battle royal.
August 23	Mahiro Kiryu	TJPW Tokyo Princess Cup; Night 5	Took place during an #Rumble rules battle royalseight-woman battle royal. Kiryu pinned Kaicho to eliminate her and win the title.
August 23	Juri Suzue	TJPW Tokyo Princess Cup; Night 5	Star Planet trainee. Took place during the same battle royal. Won the bout and the title by last eliminating Miyu Yamashita and Raku simultaneously.
August 23	Poko-tan	TJPW Tokyo Princess Cup; Night 5	Mascot of DDT. Pinned Suzue backstage.
September 20	Pillow	TJPW Wrestle Princess VI	This was a Tokyo Joshi Pro-Wrestling (TJPW) event. Took place during an eight-person battle royal. Raku "knocked out" Poko-tan by smothering it with her pillow.
September 20	Mahiro Kiryu	TJPW Wrestle Princess VI	Took place during the same battle royal. Won the bout and the title by last eliminating Raku and her pillow simultaneously.
September 20	Haruna Neko	TJPW Autumn Victory in Shin-Kiba	This was a Tokyo Joshi Pro-Wrestling (TJPW) event. Neko pinned Kiryu during her own official retirement ceremony.
September 20	Mahiro Kiryu	TJPW Autumn Victory in Shin-Kiba	Neko surrendered the championship back to Kiryu immediately afterward.
October 4	Miyu Yamashita	TJPW Autumn Victory in Shinagawa	This was a Tokyo Joshi Pro-Wrestling (TJPW) event. This was a six-woman tag team match where Yamashita teamed with Hyper Misao and Kaya Toribami against Kiryu and Daisy Monkey (Arisu Endo and Suzume). Yamashita pinned Kiryu to win the match and the title.
October 4	Mahiro Kiryu	TJPW Autumn Victory in Shinagawa	Pinned Yamashita after the match.
October 8	Mahiro Kiryu's Halloween portrait purchaser list	–	Took place at an online autograph signing.
October 8	Mahiro Kiryu	–	Shredded the paper list.
October 12	Contract Signing Document for International Princess Championship	TJPW Autumn Victory in Shinjuku Vol. 1	This was a Tokyo Joshi Pro-Wrestling (TJPW) event. Kiryu was pinned by the document during a singles match with Miyu Yamashita.
October 12	Rise Shirai's binder	TJPW Autumn Victory in Shinjuku Vol. 1	Pinfall occurred backstage after the event.
October 12	Double vitamin drink	TJPW Autumn Victory in Shinjuku Vol. 1	Pinfall occurred backstage after the event.
October 12	Mahiro Kiryu	TJPW Autumn Victory in Shinjuku Vol. 1	Drank the "champion" backstage after the event.
October 26	Rika Tatsumi	TJPW Autumn Victory in Ryogoku	This was a Tokyo Joshi Pro-Wrestling (TJPW) event. Tatsumi pinned Kiryu during a tag team match where they faced Hyper Misao and Raku.
November 8	Let's Play Baseball! Shohei Ohtani Story 2025 Special Edition picture book	N/A	This occurred at a Book House Cafe. Tatsumi fell asleep holding Shohei Ohtani's picture book in her arms. A referee emerged from nowhere and scored the pin, rendering the book the new champion.
November 8	Rika Tatsumi	N/A	This occurred at a Book House Cafe. Tatsumi pinned the book by covering it with her hand.
November 9	Mahiro Kiryu	TJPW All Rise '25	This was a Tokyo Joshi Pro-Wrestling (TJPW) event. Took place backstage.
November 17	Shinji Torigoe	N/A	Professional mahjong player. Won the title in a mahjong game against Kiryu, Danshoku Dino, and Ken Ohka.
November 17	Ken Ohka's tank top	N/A	After the game, Ohka choked Torigoe with his tank top; the referee judged the item of clothing as the new champion.
November 17	Mahiro Kiryu	N/A	Ripped the "champion" to win the title.
November 22	Rika Tatsumi	TJPW Hyakumangoku Smile in Kanazawa ~ Uta Takami Homecoming Show ~	This was a Tokyo Joshi Pro-Wrestling (TJPW) event. This was a six-woman tag team match where Tatsumi teamed with Pom Harajuku and Raku against Kiryu, Hyper Misao, and Kaya Toribami. Tatsumi pinned Kiryu to win the match and the title.
December 7	Mahiro Kiryu	TJPW x Ocha Norma: Ocha Pro Korakuen	This was a Tokyo Joshi Pro-Wrestling (TJPW) event in collaboration with the idol group Ocha Norma. Tatsumi tried to allow Natsume Nakayama of Ocha Norma to pin her, but Kiryu took the opportunity instead.
December 7	Natsume Nakayama	TJPW x Ocha Norma: Ocha Pro Korakuen	Member of idol group Ocha Norma. Tatsumi choked Kiryu out and placed Nakayama on top of her.
December 7	Tea	TJPW x Ocha Norma: Ocha Pro Korakuen	Nakayama attempted to give up the title with a tea drink nearby; the referee interpreted this as her submitting to the tea.
December 7	Mahiro Kiryu	TJPW x Ocha Norma: Ocha Pro Korakuen	Took place backstage. Kiryu won by drinking the champion.
December 27	Rika Tatsumi	TJPW Year-End Party	This was a Tokyo Joshi Pro-Wrestling (TJPW) event. This was a tag team match where Tatsumi and Toga defeated Kiryu and Kakeru Sekiguchi. Tatsumi forced Kiryu to submit to win the match and the title.
December 27	Kakeru Sekiguchi	TJPW Year-End Party	Took place backstage. Won in a game of old maid.
December 27	Mahiro Kiryu	TJPW Year-End Party	Took place backstage.

==== Noah ====
GHC Heavyweight Championship
Incoming champion – Kaito Kiyomiya
Date	Winner	Event/Show	Note(s)
January 1	Ozawa	The New Year	
July 19	Kenoh	New Departure; Night 1	
July 20	Kenta	New Departure; Night 2	
November 8	Yoshiki Inamura	Star Navigation; Night 3	

GHC Junior Heavyweight Championship
Incoming champion – Daga
Date	Winner	Event/Show	Note(s)
January 1	Eita	The New Year	This was a two out of three falls match. Eita won 2–1.
May 3	Yo-Hey	Memorial Voyage in Kokugikan	
September 8	Hiromu Takahashi	N-1 Victory; Night 1	

GHC National Championship
Incoming champion – Manabu Soya
Date	Winner	Event/Show	Note(s)
January 11	Tetsuya Endo	Star Navigation Premium; Night 1	
February 11	Manabu Soya	Star Navigation Premium; Night 2	
March 2	Ozawa	Memorial Voyage in Yokohama	This was a Winner Takes All Lumberjack Deathmatch, where Ozawa's GHC Heavyweight Championship was also on the line.
March 2	Vacated	Memorial Voyage in Yokohama	Ozawa relinquished the title right after the bout concluded.
April 11	Galeno	Sunny Voyage	Defeated Tetsuya Endo in a tournament final to win the vacant title.
October 16	Dragon Bane	Star Navigation	

GHC Women's Championship
Co-promoted with Dream Star Fighting Marigold
Incoming champion – Kouki Amarei
Date	Winner	Event/Show	Note(s)
June 2	Takumi Iroha	Monday Magic Prime Time Season #2	

GHC Tag Team Championship
Incoming champions – Naomichi Marufuji and Takashi Sugiura
Date	Winner	Event/Show	Note(s)
January 1	Team 2000X (Jack Morris and Omos)	The New Year	
January 25	Team 2000X (Jack Morris and Daga)	Sunny Voyage	Morris and Omos originally won the titles. On January 25, lineal champion Omos announced that he would be returning to WWE and gifted his half of the titles to stablemate Daga. Noah did not recognize this substitution and vacated the titles.
January 27	Vacated	—	Officially vacated due to Noah not recognising the transfer of the championship.
April 6	Team 2000X (Jack Morris and Daga)	Sunny Voyage	Defeated All Rebellion (Galeno and Kaito Kiyomiya) to win the vacant titles.
May 3	Kenoh and Ulka Sasaki	Memorial Voyage in Kokugikan	
June 3	Passionate Ratel's (Manabu Soya and Daiki Inaba)	Star Navigation; Night 2	
August 11	Team 2000X (Masa Kitamiya and Takashi Sugiura)	Kawasaki Summer Voyage	
November 8	Hank and Tank	Star Navigation; Night 3	
November 21	Team 2000X (Masa Kitamiya and Takashi Sugiura)	Cross Over	
December 13	Maruken (Kenoh and Naomichi Marufuji)	Sunny Voyage	

GHC Junior Heavyweight Tag Team Championship
Incoming champions – Ratel's / Passionate Ratel's (Hayata and Yo-Hey)
On February 11, Ratel's name was changed to Passionate Ratel's
Date	Winner	Event/Show	Note(s)
March 22	Amakusa and Junta Miyawaki	Star Navigation Premium; Night 3	
May 3	Los Golpeadores (Dragon Bane and Alpha Wolf)	Memorial Voyage in Kokugikan	
October 11	Los Intocables (Daga and Daiki Odashima)	Wrestle Odyssey	On December 13, Daga and Odashima adopted the name "Los Intocables."

GHC Openweight Hardcore Championship
Incoming champion – Shuji Ishikawa
Date	Winner	Event/Show	Note(s)
June 30	Hayata	Wrestle Magic	

==== TJPW ====
Princess of Princess Championship
Incoming champion – Miu Watanabe
Date	Winner	Event/Show	Note(s)
January 4	Mizuki	Tokyo Joshi Pro '25	
September 20	Miu Watanabe	Wrestle Princess VI	

International Princess Championship
Incoming champion – Yuki Arai
Date	Winner	Event/Show	Note(s)
January 4	Suzume	Tokyo Joshi Pro '25	
July 21	Moka Miyamoto	Summer Sun Princess	
August 28	Vacated	–	Miyamoto relinquished the championship due to illness.
September 20	Arisu Endo	Wrestle Princess VI	Defeated Priscilla Kelly to win the vacant title.

Princess Tag Team Championship
Incoming champions – 121000000 (Miyu Yamashita and Maki Itoh)
Date	Winner	Event/Show	Note(s)
March 16	Kyoraku Kyomei (Hyper Misao and Shoko Nakajima)	Grand Princess	
September 20	Ober Eats (Yuki Kamifuku and Wakana Uehara)	Wrestle Princess VI	

=== ChocoPro ===
Super Asia Championship
Incoming champion – Mei Suruga
Date	Winner	Event/Show	Note(s)
September 5 (aired September 13)	Rina Yamashita	ChocoPro 472: Game Changer	

Asia Dream Tag Team Championship
Incoming champion – Black Komanechi (Antonio Honda and Tokiko Kirihara)
Date	Winner	Event/Show	Note(s)
March 31 (aired April 4)	Bellflowers (Makoto and Sayaka)	ChocoPro 438: Warring Era	
November 28 (aired December 6)	MiyaSoy (Miya Yotsuba and Soy)	ChocoPro 491: Rivals	
December 30 (aired January 12, 2026)	Egg Tart (Chie Koishikawa and Hagane Shinno)	ChocoPro 496: Purple Chocolate	

=== CMLL ===
CMLL World Heavyweight Championship
Incoming champion – Gran Guerrero
Date	Winner	Event/Show	Note(s)
November 28	Claudio Castagnoli	Leyenda de Azul	

CMLL World Light Heavyweight Championship
Incoming champion – Averno
Date	Winner	Event/Show	Note(s)
August 1	MJF	Viernes Espectacular	
September 19	Místico	CMLL 92nd Anniversary Show	This was a Title vs. Mask match.

CMLL World Middleweight Championship
Incoming champion – Templario
No title changes.

CMLL World Welterweight Championship
Incoming champion – Titán
No title changes.

CMLL World Lightweight Championship
Incoming champion – Stigma
No title changes.

CMLL World Mini-Estrella Championship
Incoming champion – Último Dragoncito
Date	Winner	Event/Show	Note(s)
September 26	Angelito	Super Viernes: Noche de Campeones	

CMLL World Micro-Estrellas Championship
Incoming champion – Vacant
Date	Winner	Event/Show	Note(s)
January 1	Tengu	Sin Salida	Defeated KeMalito in a tournament final to win the vacant title.
September 26	KeMalito	Super Viernes: Noche de Campeones	

CMLL World Women's Championship
Incoming champion – Zeuxis
Date	Winner	Event/Show	Note(s)
June 18	Mercedes Moné	Grand Slam Mexico	Co-promoted with All Elite Wrestling (AEW).

CMLL Japan Women's Championship
Incoming champion – Unagi Sayaka
Date	Winner	Event/Show	Note(s)
March 1	Lluvia	Lady's Lucha Fiesta #3	
July 4	Dark Silueta	Viernes Espectacular	
September 10	Koguma	Stardom Nighter in Korakuen	This was a Stardom event.
October 11	Hazuki	Stardom	This was a Stardom event.

CMLL World Tag Team Championship
Incoming champions – Los Hermanos Chavez (Ángel de Oro and Niebla Roja)
Date	Winner	Event/Show	Note(s)

CMLL Arena Coliseo Tag Team Championship
Incoming champions – El Triangulo (El Hijo del Villano III and Villano III Jr.)
No title changes.

CMLL World Women's Tag Team Championship
Incoming champions – Vacant
Date	Winner	Event/Show	Note(s)
March 21	Las Chicas Indomables (La Jarochita and Lluvia)	Homenaje a Dos Leyendas	Defeated Taya Valkyrie and Lady Frost in a tournament final to win the vacant titles.

CMLL World Trios Championship
Incoming champions – Los Infernales (Averno, Euforia, and Mephisto)
Date	Winner	Event/Show	Note(s)
May 16	El Sky Team (Místico, Máscara Dorada, and Neón)	Viernes Espectacular	

NWA World Historic Light Heavyweight Championship
Incoming champion – Atlantis Jr.
No title changes.

NWA World Historic Middleweight Championship
Incoming champion – Flip Gordon
No title changes.

NWA World Historic Welterweight Championship
Incoming champion – Máscara Dorada
No title changes.

Mexican National Heavyweight Championship
Incoming champion – Star Black
Date	Winner	Event/Show	Note(s)
March 28	Akuma	Viernes Espectacular	

Mexican National Light Heavyweight Championship
Incoming champion – Esfinge
No title changes.

Mexican National Middleweight Championship
Incoming champion – Guerrero Maya Jr.
No title changes.

Mexican National Welterweight Championship
Incoming champion – Magia Blanca
No title changes.

Mexican National Lightweight Championship
Incoming champion – Rayo Metálico
No title changes.

Mexican National Women's Championship
Incoming champion – Sanely
Date	Winner	Event/Show	Note(s)
March 7	India Sioux	Función 100% Femenil	

Mexican National Tag Team Championship
Incoming champions – Los Depredadores (Magnus and Rugido)
No title changes.

Mexican National Women's Tag Team Championship
Incoming champions – Andrómeda and Skadi
No title changes.

Mexican National Trios Championship
Incoming champions – Los Viajeros del Espacio (Futuro, Max Star, and Hombre Bala Jr.)
Date	Winner	Event/Show	Note(s)
June 16	Los Herederos (Felino Jr., El Cobarde, and Hijo de Stuka Jr.)	Lunes Clásico	

Occidente Heavyweight Championship
Incoming champion – Bestia Negra
No title changes.

Occidente Middleweight Championship
Incoming champion – Zandokan Jr.
No title changes.

Occidente Women's Championship
Incoming champion – Lluvia
No title changes.

Occidente Tag Team Championship
Incoming champions – Dulce Gardenia and La Fashion
Date	Winner	Event/Show	Note(s)
N/A	Vacated	N/A	The reason or date the titles were vacated is unknown.
November 4	Gallo Jr. and Ráfaga Jr.	Martes de Glamour	Defeated Prince Drago and Black Warrior Jr. in a tournament final to win the vacant titles.

Occidente Women's Tag Team Championship
Incoming champions – Adira and Náutica
Date	Winner	Event/Show	Note(s)
N/A	Vacated	N/A	The reason or date the titles were vacated is unknown
January 7	Las Infernales (Dark Silueta and Zeuxis)	Martes de Glamour	Defeated Las Chicas Indomables (La Jarochita and Lluvia) to win the vacant titles.

Occidente Trios Championship
Incoming champions – Crixus, Difunto, and Raider
Date	Winner	Event/Show	Note(s)
May 20	Furia Roja, Guerrero de la Muerte, and Ráfaga	Martes de Glamour	

=== The Crash ===
The Crash Heavyweight Championship
Incoming champion – DMT Azul
Date	Winner	Event/Show	Note(s)
October 3	Andrade El Idolo	The Crash	

The Crash Women's Championship
Incoming champion – Keyra
No title changes.

The Crash Cruiserweight Championship
Incoming champion – Tonalli
Date	Winner	Event/Show	Note(s)
November 7	Noisy Boy	The Crash XIV Aniversario	This was a four-way ladder match also involving Halloween NG and Oni El Bendito.

The Crash Junior Championship
Incoming champion – Gallo Extreme
Date	Winner	Event/Show	Note(s)
June 20	Atomik Star	The Crash	

The Crash Tag Team Championship
Incoming champions – La Dinistia Wagner / Legado Wagner (El Hijo de Dr. Wagner Jr. and Galeno del Mal)
Date	Winner	Event/Show	Note(s)
November 7	The Good Brothers (Doc Gallows and Karl Anderson)	The Crash XIV Aniversario	This was a three-way tag team match also involving Black Rebellion (D'Luxe and Pierroth Jr).

=== CZW ===
CZW World Heavyweight Championship
Incoming champion – Eran Ashe
No title changes.

CZW World Tag Team Championship
Incoming champions – Milk Chocolate (Brandon Watts and Randy Summers)
Date	Winner	Event/Show	Note(s)
February 22	Post Game (Mike Walker and Vinny Talotta)	CZW 26th Anniversary Show	
June 21	Rivality (MBM and Ultima Sombra)	Showdown at Sundown	
September 27	Post Game (Mike Walker and Vinny Talotta)	BZW Just an Illusion	This was a Banger Zone Wrestling (BZW) event. Defeated MBM and TLB, who replaced Sombra.
October 18	The Lost Boys (Athan Promise and Miles Penn)	Déjà Vu	
November 1	Vendetta (Eran Ashe and Troy Parker)	State of Emergency	
November 1	The Lost Boys (Athan Promise and Miles Penn)	State of Emergency	

=== DEFY ===
DEFY World Championship
Incoming champion – Kenta
Date	Winner	Event/Show	Note(s)
February 7	Ricky Starks	Hundredth – 8 Year Anniversary	
February 28	Vacated	–	Starks vacated the title after signing with WWE.
March 15	Clark Connors	Aftermath	Defeated Starboy Charlie in the final of the Super 8XGP Tournament to win the vacant title.
September 19	Bryan Keith	Aeon	

DEFY Women's Championship
Incoming champion – Marina Shafir
No title changes.

DEFY PrimoLucha Championship
Incoming champion – Guillermo Rosas
Date	Winner	Event/Show	Note(s)
May 16	Kevin Blackwood	Fatal Fantasy	This was a scramble match also involving Cody Chhun, Eddie Pearl, Evan Rivers and Miles Deville.

DEFY Pacific Northwest Heavyweight Championship
(Title created)
Date	Winner	Event/Show	Note(s)
December 27	Guillermo Rosas	Aeon	Defeated Casey Ferreira and Cole Rivera in a triple threat match to become the inaugural champion.

DEFY Tag Team Championship
Incoming champions – Sinner and Saint (Judas Icarus and Travis Williams)
No title changes.

=== DG ===
Open the Dream Gate Championship
Incoming champion – Yamato
Date	Winner	Event/Show	Note(s)
July 13	Shun Skywalker	Kobe Pro-Wrestling Festival	
August 17	Madoka Kikuta	Dangerous Gate	

Open the Brave Gate Championship
Incoming champion – Yamato
Date	Winner	Event/Show	Note(s)
April 7	Vacated	–	Yamato vacated the title due to also holding the Open the Dream Gate Championship.
May 5	U-T	Dead or Alive	Defeated Homare in a tournament final to win the vacant title.
July 13	Ryoya Tanaka	Kobe Pro-Wrestling Festival	

Open the Twin Gate Championship
Incoming champions – Z-Brats (Jason Lee and Kota Minoura)
Date	Winner	Event/Show	Note(s)
August 17	D'courage (Dragon Dia and Yuki Yoshioka)	Dangerous Gate	
November 3	Love & Peace (Jacky Kamei and Riiita)	Gate of Destiny; Night 2	

Open the Triangle Gate Championship
Incoming champions – Paradox (BxB Hulk, Susumu Yokosuka, and Kagetora)
Date	Winner	Event/Show	Note(s)
May 5	Natural Vibes (Flamita, Kzy and Strong Machine J)	Dead or Alive	
June 4	Z-Brats (Ishin, Homare, and Yoshiki Kato)	Rainbow Gate; Night 2	
July 13	Bendito, Flamita, and Luis Mante	Kobe Pro-Wrestling Festival	This was a three-way tag team elimination match also involving Love And Peace (Jacky Kamei, Mochizuki Jr. and Riiita).
September 4	Gajadokuro (Ishin, Kai, and Yoshiki Kato)	Storm Gate; Night 1	This was a ladder match. Previously competed under the name Z-Brats.
November 3	Psypatra (Gianni Valletta, Homare, and Yoshiki Kato)	Gate of Destiny; Night 2	
November 26	Vacated	King of Gate Finals	The titles were vacated due to Skywalker suffering a back injury.
December 27	Love & Peace (Ben-K, Hyo, and Mochizuki Jr.)	Fantastic Gate; Night 12	Defeated Gajadokuro (Kota Minoura, Jason Lee, and Kai) and Natural Vibes (Kzy, U-T, and Strong Machine J) in a tournament final, which was contested as a three-way tag team elimination match, to win the vacant titles.

Open the Owarai Gate Championship
Incoming champion – Lingerie Mutoh
Date	Winner	Event/Show	Note(s)
January 16	Takashi Yoshida	Open the New Year Gate; Night 5	Won under the drag persona "Takako Yoshida."
March 1	Kuishinbo Kamen	Truth Gate; Night 11	
November 2	Jiro Shimbashi	The Gate of Destiny; Night 1	
December 16	Último Dragón	Fantanstic Gate; Night 9	Won via fan vote.
December 16	Vacated	Fantanstic Gate; Night 9	Dragón immediately relinquished the title.

=== Diana ===
World Woman Pro-Wrestling Diana World Championship
Incoming champion – Ayame Sasamura
Date	Winner	Event/Show	Note(s)
January 19	Hiragi Kurumi	Diana	
March 9	Risa Sera	Diana	
August 9	Haruka Umesaki	Diana	
December 14	Vacated	Diana	Umesaki vacated the title after her title defense against Debbie Keitel.

World Woman Pro-Wrestling Diana Queen Elizabeth Championship
Incoming champion – Kyoko Inoue
Date	Winner	Event/Show	Note(s)
December 14	Vacated	Diana	Inoue vacated the title after her title defense against Jaguar Yokota and Himiko.

World Woman Pro-Wrestling Diana Crystal Championship
Incoming champion – Nanami
Date	Winner	Event/Show	Note(s)
April 6	Vacated	Diana	Vacated after Nanami won the World Woman Pro-Wrestling Diana Tag Team Championship.
April 27	Honoka	Diana	Defeated Soy in the final of the Crystal Tournament to win the vacant title.
July 26	Mizuki Kato	Future Sight Vol. 36	
September 14	Miran	Future Sight Vol. 38	

World Woman Pro-Wrestling Diana Tag Team Championship
Incoming champion – Ayaka (Ayako Sato and Hanako Nakamori)
Date	Winner	Event/Show	Note(s)
April 6	Nijumaru (Nanami Hatano and Rina Amikura)	Diana	This was a three-way tag team match also involving Captain Armstrong (Yuki Miyazaki and Yuko Sakurai).
July 27	Caffeine and Crush (Ayako Sato and Debbie Keitel)	Diana	
October 5	Vacated	Diana	Caffeine and Crush vacated the titles after their title defense against Chobuki (Haruka Umesaki and Unagi Sayaka).

=== DPW ===
DPW Worlds Championship
Incoming champion – Jake Something
Date	Winner	Event/Show	Note(s)
February 8	Vacated	–	Something vacated the title after suffering a torn bicep.
April 18 (aired April 23)	Adam Priest	Title Fight in Vegas	Last eliminated Calvin Tankman in an Ultimate Conflict match to win the vacant title.
October 19 (aired October 26)	Jake Something	Super Battle	This was a Steel Cage match.
December 12 (aired December 21)	LaBron Kozone	4th Anniversary	This was a Winner Takes All match also for Kozone's DPW National Championship.

DPW Women's Worlds Championship
Incoming champion – Miyuki Takase
Date	Winner	Event/Show	Note(s)
January 26 (aired February 2)	Dani Luna	Title Fight in Texas	
June 15 (aired June 22)	Nicole Matthews	Victory Lap	This was Matthews' Last Chance match.
October 19 (aired October 26)	Queen Aminata	Super Battle	
December 12 (aired December 21)	Vacated	4th Anniversary	The title was vacated due to Aminata suffering a neck injury.
December 12 (aired December 21)	Mei Suruga	4th Anniversary	Defeated Lena Kross to win the vacant title.

DPW National Championship
Incoming champion – LaBron Kozone
No title changes.

DPW Worlds Tag Team Championship
Incoming champions – Violence is Forever (Kevin Ku and Dominic Garrini)
Date	Winner	Event/Show	Note(s)
February 16 (aired February 23)	Grizzled Young Veterans (James Drake and Zack Gibson)	No Pressure	
July 13 (aired July 20)	Miracle Generation (Dustin Walker and Kylon King)	Tag Festival	This was the final of the Tag Festival tournament. This was also a four-way tag team elimination match, also involving Jake Something and The Beast Mortos, and The WorkHorsemen (Anthony Henry and JD Drake).
November 7 (aired November 16)	Bo-Dash (Bojack and Morgan Dash)	Showdown in Cary II	
December 12 (aired December 21)	Miracle Generation (Dustin Walker and Kylon King)	4th Anniversary	

=== EVE ===
Pro-Wrestling: EVE Championship
Incoming champion – Nina Samuels
Date	Winner	Event/Show	Note(s)
May 2	Nightshade	EVE 134: Punkin' Investigators – 15th Anniversary Spectacular	
August 23	Nyla Rose	EVE 138: EVE x The World	Aubrey Edwards served the special guest referee.
November 7	Rhio	EVE 141: Elite Encounters	

Pro-Wrestling: EVE International Championship
Incoming champion – Yuu
Date	Winner	Event/Show	Note(s)
January 10	Nina Samuels	EVE 130: Wrestle Queendom 7: The Ultimate SHE-1	This was a Winner Takes All match, where Samuels' Pro-Wrestling: EVE Championship was also on the line. This was also a semifinal match in the SHE-1 Tournament.
March 7	Skye Smitson	EVE 132: Women Behaving Badly #IWD2025	This was a three-way match also involving Alex Windsor.
April 5	Anita Vaughan	EVE 133: Wrestle (Wo)Mania	
July 4	Kris Statlander	EVE 136: Mean Grrrls	

Pro-Wrestling: EVE Tag Team Championship
Incoming champions – The Gals (Anita Vaughn and Debbie Keitel)
Date	Winner	Event/Show	Note(s)
January 10	Hard Up North (Harley Hudson and Lucy Sky)	EVE 130: Wrestle Queendom 7: The Ultimate SHE-1	This was a four-way tag team match also involving Aluna and Lucie Lee, and The French Connection (Celine and Princesse Lauriana).
July 4	Big Beefy Bitches (Rhio and Emersyn Jayne)	EVE 136: Mean Grrrls	
August 1	Pretty Psycho (Amira Blair and Zoe Lucas)	EVE 137: Hit Me With Your Best Chop	They won the match by forfeit due to Rhio defending the titles alone.
August 1	Lallie (Hollie Barlow and Lana Austin)	EVE 137: Hit Me With Your Best Chop	This was a three-way tag team match also involving Hard Up North (Harley Hudson and Lucy Sky).

=== Freedoms ===
King of Freedom World Championship
Incoming champion – Toru Sugiura
Date	Winner	Event/Show	Note(s)
August 28	Violento Jack	Freedoms/Jun Kasai Produce Tokyo Death Match Carnival Vol. 2	This was a Fluorescent Lighttubes Death Tower Alpha Death Match.

King of Freedom World Junior Heavyweight Championship
Incoming champion – Yuya Susumu
Date	Winner	Event/Show	Note(s)
August 17 (aired August 22)	Kengo	Feast of the Free People	

King of Freedom World Tag Team Championship
Incoming champions – Violento Jack and Kenji Fukimoto
Date	Winner	Event/Show	Note(s)
March 19	Masashi Takeda and Yusaku Ito	The Gekokujo	This was a Double Hellboard and Free Weapon Deathmatch.

Barefoot King Championship
Incoming champion – Takayuki Ueki
Date	Winner	Event/Show	Note(s)
January 3	Rekka	Happy New Freedoms	This was a 10-man battle royal. Rekka last eliminated Kyu Mogami to win the title.
February 7 (aired February 15)	Kentaro Hachisu	Go Beyond the Limit	This was a six-way match also involving Takayuki Ueki, Brahman Shu, Brahman Kei, and Kyu Mogami.
≤ July 10	Takayuki Ueki	N/A	The exact circumstances in which Ueki won the championship are uncertain. On July 10, 2025, at Freedoms/Jun Kasai Produce Tokyo Death Match Carnival Vol. 1, Ueki competed as the titleholder.
July 10 (aired July 19)	Jun Masaoka	Freedoms/Jun Kasai Produce Tokyo Death Match Carnival Vol. 1	This was a Barefoot MJ Death Match.
July 10 (aired July 19)	Vacated	Freedoms/Jun Kasai Produce Tokyo Death Match Carnival Vol. 1	After winning the title, Masaoka dropped the belt into a trash can, which was sanctioned as a vacancy of the title.
N/A	Chest Hair Brothers (Takayuki Ueki and Kentaro Hachisu)	N/A	The exact circumstances in which Ueki and Hachisu won the championship are uncertain.
August 17 (aired August 22)	Takashi Sasaki and Unagi Sayaka	Feast of the Free People	Sayaka became the first female to hold the titles. The exact length of the reign is uncertain, possibly lasting between 0 and 130 days.
≤ August 17	Takayuki Ueki	N/A	The exact circumstances in which Ueki won the championship are uncertain. He was billed as champion at Jun Kasai Produce Blood X'Mas on December 25, 2025.
December 25 (aired December 30)	Daisuke Masaoka	Freedoms/Jun Kasai Produce Blood X'Mas	This was a Barefoot Toy Block Deathmatch.

=== GanPro ===
Spirit of Ganbare World Openweight Championship
Incoming champion – Yumehito Imanari
Date	Winner	Event/Show	Note(s)
August 26	Masaaki Mochizuki	Mizuki Watase 10th Anniversary Debut ~ Summer Film ni Notte	

Spirit of Ganbare World Tag Team Championship
Incoming champions – Renegades (Mizuki Watase and Shigehiro Irie)
Date	Winner	Event/Show	Note(s)
September 27	Ryota Nakatsu and Takumi Tsukamoto	Ganbare Pro	
December 27 (aired January 2, 2026)	Yumehito Imanari and Shinichiro Tominaga	Before Sunrise	

=== GCW ===
GCW World Championship
Incoming champion – Mance Warner
Date	Winner	Event/Show	Note(s)
January 19	Effy	The People vs. GCW	
November 22	Atticus Cogar	Dream On	This was a three-way hardcore match also involving Charles Mason.

GCW Ultraviolent Championship
Incoming champion – Vacant
Date	Winner	Event/Show	Note(s)
January 19	Matt Tremont	The People vs. GCW	This was a Unification DLC match also including Brandon Kirk, Ciclope, Dr. Redacted, Drew Parker, John Wayne Murdoch, Matthew Justice, Rina Yamashita, and Maki Itoh. Itoh's GCW Extreme Championship was also on the line.

GCW World Tag Team Championship
Incoming champions – Violence is Forever (Kevin Ku and Dominic Garrini)
Date	Winner	Event/Show	Note(s)
January 19	Gahbage Daddies (Cole Radrick and Alec Price)	The People vs. GCW	
March 29	Violence is Forever (Kevin Ku and Dominic Garrini)	No Compadre	This was a four-way tag team match, also involving Bang And Matthews (August Matthews and Davey Bang), and Hot Commodity (Hayden Backlund and Trevor Outlaw).
April 18	YDNP (Alec Price and Jordan Oliver)	Joey Janela's Spring Break 9	
September 12	Brothers of Funstruction (Yabo the Clown and Ruffo the Clown)	Evil Deeds	This was a Winners Take All Riddlebox match also for YDNP's JCW Tag Team Championship.
October 12	Bustah and The Brain (Alec Price and Jordan Oliver)	Fight Club: Night 2	Previously held the titles under the name YDNP.

JCW World Championship
Incoming champion – Masha Slamovich
Date	Winner	Event/Show	Note(s)
October 26	Vacated	Possession	Slamovich was stripped of the title after domestic abuse allegations were made against her by Akira.
October 26	Billie Starkz	Possession	Defeated Charles Mason to win the vacant title.

GCW Extreme Championship
Incoming champion – Maki Itoh
Date	Winner	Event/Show	Note(s)
January 19	Matt Tremont	The People vs. GCW	This was a Unification DLC match also including Brandon Kirk, Ciclope, Dr. Redacted, Drew Parker, John Wayne Murdoch, Matthew Justice and Rina Yamashita, alongside the vacant GCW Ultraviolent Championship on the line.
January 19	Unified	The People vs. GCW	Unified into the GCW Ultraviolent Championship.

=== Gleat ===
G-Rex Championship
Incoming champion – Soma Watanabe
Date	Winner	Event/Show	Note(s)
January 11	Kaito Ishida	Gleat Ver. 15	
July 1	Katsuhiko Nakajima	Gleat Ver. 19 ~ 4th Anniversary Special Event	
October 9	El Lindaman	Gleat Ver. EX ~ Gleat vs. Kyoteki	

G-Infinity Championship
Incoming champions – Kuroshio Tokyo Japan and Seigo Tachibana
Date	Winner	Event/Show	Note(s)
January 20	Tokyo Bad Boys (SBK and Takuma)	G Prowrestling Ver. 83	
June 1	Issei Onitsuka and Takehiro Yamamura	Gleat Ver. 17	
July 9	Vacated	–	The titles were vacated after Issei Onitsuka retired from professional wrestling.
October 9	Cima and Kuroshio Tokyo Japan	Gleat Ver. EX ~ Gleat vs. Kyoteki	Defeated Anti-Gle Monsters (Brass Knuckles Jun and Ryuichi Kawakami) to win the vacant titles.
November 10	Vacated	–	
December 13	Black Generation International (Kaito Ishida and Kazma Sakamoto)	Gleat Ver. 100 ~ Premium Edition	Defeated El Lindaman and Takehiro Yamamura to win the vacant titles.

G-Rush Championship
(Title introduced)
Date	Winner	Event/Show	Note(s)
February 22	El Lindaman	Gleat Ver. 16	Defeated Lio Rush to become the inaugural champion.
April 19	Issei Onitsuka	G Prowrestling Ver. 88	
July 9	Vacated	–	The title was vacated after Issei Onitsuka retired from professional wrestling.
December 4	Minoru Tanaka	G Prowrestling Ver. 99	Defeated Brass Knuckles Jun and Kaito Ishida to win the vacant title.

Lidet UWF World Championship
Incoming champion – Katsuhiko Nakajima
No title changes.

=== GWF ===
GWF World Championship
Incoming champion – Peter Tihanyi
Date	Winner	Event/Show	Note(s)
March 2	Vacated	–	Vacated due to Tihanyi sustaining a shoulder injury.
April 13	Metehan	Mystery Mayhem	Defeated Axel Tischer to win the vacant title.
June 1	Axel Tischer	Rising Heat	This was a three-way match also involving Erkan Sulcani.
November 2	Rambo	Legacy: 30 Jahre Berlin Wrestling	This was a three-way match also involving Metehan

GWF Women's World Championship
Incoming champion – Lizzy Evo
Date	Winner	Event/Show	Note(s)
April 4	Vacated	–	Vacated due to Evo being unavailable to defend the title.
April 13	Jane Nero	Mystery Mayhem	Defeated Amy Heartbeat to win the vacant title.

GWF Berlin Championship
Incoming champion – Rambo
Date	Winner	Event/Show	Note(s)
September 7	Fast Time Moodo	Battlefield	This was a Street Fight.
October 12	Carlito	Blockbuster 5	

GWF Tag Team Championship
Incoming champions – Two Sweet Heroes (Aytaç Bahar and Pascal Spalter)
Date	Winner	Event/Show	Note(s)
March 2	Big and Perfect (Toni Harting and Big Nik)	Chaos City 10	This was a Chaos City match, where the losing team was forced to disband.
September 7	Sunshine Machine (Chuck Mambo and TK Cooper)	Battlefield	

GWF Mixed Tag Team Championship
Incoming champions – Der Clan / Gold Rush (Pahlevan Nima and Sultan Suzu)
Nima and Suzu were part of the stable Der Clan before adopting the subname Gold Rush.
Date	Winner	Event/Show	Note(s)
July 6	Team Blackout (Laurance Roman and Stephanie Maze)	Summer Smash 10	
November 2	Joshua Amaru and Cory Zero	Legacy: 30 Jahre Berlin Wrestling	

=== HOG ===
HOG Heavyweight Championship
Incoming champion – Mike Santana
Date	Winner	Event/Show	Note(s)
June 7	Charles Mason	Mike Santana Presents Puerto Rican Weekend	Mason invoked his "Matt Travis Memorial Contract." This was originally a singles match between Santana and Tomohiro Ishii but converted into a three-way match after Mason invoked his contract mid-match.

HOG Women's Championship
Incoming champion – Megan Bayne
Date	Winner	Event/Show	Note(s)
May 9	Vacated	Waging War	Bayne was stripped of the title due to not regularly defending the title.
May 9	Indi Hartwell	Waging War	Defeated Miyu Yamashita to win the vacant title.
November 21	Shotzi Blackheart	Return to The Windy City	

HOG Crown Jewel Championship
Incoming champion – Zilla Fatu
Date	Winner	Event/Show	Note(s)
August 1	Bully Ray	High Intensity	This was a tables match.
September 4	Zilla Fatu	Philadelphia	

HOG Cruiserweight Championship
Incoming champion – Daron Richardson
No title changes.

HOG Tag Team Championship
Incoming champions – The Cold-Blooded Killers (Charles Mason, Nolo Kitano, Raheem Royal, and Jay Armani)
Date	Winner	Event/Show	Note(s)
March 15	The Mane Event (Jay Lyon and Midas Black)	City of Dreamz	This was a Title vs. Career three-on-two handicap two out of three falls match. Kitano, Royal, and Armani represented The Cold-Blooded Killers. The Mane Event won 2–1.
October 10	The Hardys (Matt Hardy and Jeff Hardy)	With Glory Comes Pride	This was a Winner Takes All match, with The Hardys' TNA World Tag Team Championship also on the line.

LPW Heavyweight Championship
Incoming champion – Oni King
Date	Winner	Event/Show	Note(s)
March 21	Jodi Aura	Relentless	

LPW Women's Championship
Incoming champion – Diamond Virgo
Date	Winner	Event/Show	Note(s)
June 6	Amiira Sahar	Fortitude	

LPW Tag Team Championship
(Title introduced)
Date	Winner	Event/Show	Note(s)
December 20	Dual Focus (JJP and KB Prime)	Ascension	Defeated Scam Likely (Jay Champagne and Vic Vendetta) in a tournament final to become the inaugural champions.

=== Ice Ribbon ===
ICE×∞ Championship
Incoming champion – Yuki Mashiro
Date	Winner	Event/Show	Note(s)
January 13	Manami Katsu	New Ice Ribbon #1394	
December 31	Vacated	New Ice Ribbon #1464 ~ RibbonMania	Katsu vacated the title due to illness.
December 31	Kaho Matsushita	New Ice Ribbon #1464 ~ RibbonMania	Defeated Kirari Wakana in a three-way two out of three falls match to win the vacant title.

FantastICE Championship
Incoming champion – Akane Fujita
Date	Winner	Event/Show	Note(s)
December 31	Tsukina Umino	New Ice Ribbon #1464 ~ RibbonMania	

Triangle Ribbon Championship
Incoming champion – Kyuri
Date	Winner	Event/Show	Note(s)
February 11	Kaori Yoneyama	New Ice Ribbon #1400	This was a three-way match also involving Arisa Shinose.
April 7	Minoru Fujita	Gokigen Pro Wrestling Matsuzawa-san Debut 6th Anniversary	This was a Gokigen Pro Wrestling show. This was a three-way match also involving Matsuzawa-san.
April 13	Kakeru Sekiguchi	Gokigen Pro Gokigen April	This was a Gokigen Pro Wrestling show. This was a three-way match also involving Kaori Yoneyama.
April 19	Yasu Urano	Gokigen Pro Gokigen Easter	This was a Gokigen Pro Wrestling show. This was a three-way match also involving Kaori Yoneyama.
May 28	Minoru Fujita	Gokigen Pro Hataage	This was a Gokigen Pro Wrestling show. This was a three-way match also involving Rina Yamashita.
July 26	Vacated	New Ice Ribbon #1433	The championship was vacated when Minoru Fujita's title defense against Akane Fujita and Satsuki Totoro ended in a fifteen-minute time limit draw.
August 4	Nanami Hatano	Gokigen Pro Amistad #7	This was a Gokigen Pro Wrestling show. Defeated Kaori Yoneyama and Matsuzawa-san in three-way match to win the vacant title. Hatano was previously known mononymously as Nanami.
October 25	Makoto	Gokigen Pro Amistad #15	This was a Gokigen Pro Wrestling show. This was a three-way match also involving Kaori Yoneyama.
December 31	Kaori Yoneyama	New Ice Ribbon #1464 ~ RibbonMania	This was a three-way match also involving Mase Hiiro.

International Ribbon Tag Team Championship
Incoming champions – Mukomako (Hamuko Hoshi and Makoto)
Date	Winner	Event/Show	Note(s)
March 16	KiraMiku (Kirari Wakana and Miku Kanae)	New Ice Ribbon #1408	
April 27	Cheerful Princess (Misa Kagura and Arisa Shinose)	New Ice Ribbon #1416	
May 25	Bad Butts (Ancham and Yappy)	New Ice Ribbon #1422	
September 21	Victoria Pinky (Manami Katsu and Misa Kagura)	New Ice Ribbon #1444 in TokyoSquare	

=== IWRG ===
IWRG Intercontinental Heavyweight Championship
Incoming champion – DMT Azul
Date	Winner	Event/Show	Note(s)
January 1	Dr. Wagner Jr.	Guerreros de Acero	This was a Steel Cage Ladder match.
October 30	DMT Azul	El Castillo del Terror	This was a four-way casket match also involving Chessman and Pirata Morgan.

IWRG Intercontinental Middleweight Championship
Incoming champion – Arez
Date	Winner	Event/Show	Note(s)
December 18	Vacated	Revolución 63	
December 18	Toxin	Revolución 63	Defeated Látigo, Multifacetico Jr., Aero Boy, and Septimo Dragon to win the vacant title.

IWRG Intercontinental Welterweight Championship
Incoming champion – Multifacetico Jr.
Date	Winner	Event/Show	Note(s)
March 9	Caballero de Plata	IWRG	

IWRG Intercontinental Lightweight Championship
Incoming champion – Aguila Roja
No title changes.

IWRG Intercontinental Women's Championship
Incoming champion – Keyra
Date	Winner	Event/Show	Note(s)
October 30	Lady Maravilla	El Castillo del Terror	This was a three-way match also involving Sagitarius.

IWRG Intercontinental Tag Team Championship
Incoming champions – El Hijo de Canis Lupus and Hell Boy
Date	Winner	Event/Show	Note(s)
January 1	Mexa Boy's (Noisy Boy and Spider Fly)	Guerreros de Acero	This was a three-way steel cage also involving Mala Fama (Látigo and Toxin).

IWRG Intercontinental Trios Championship
Incoming champions – Las Shotas (Jessy Ventura, La Diva Salvaje, and Mamba)
Date	Winner	Event/Show	Note(s)
August 21	Revolución Crew (El Hijo de Canis Lupus, Multifacetico Jr., and Rey Mictlan)	IWRG Thursday Night Wrestling	

IWRG Junior de Juniors Championship
Incoming champion – El Hijo de Canis Lupus
Date	Winner	Event/Show	Note(s)
October 12	Villano V Jr.	IWRG	

IWRG Rey del Ring Championship
Incoming champion – Vangellys
Date	Winner	Event/Show	Note(s)
June 1	El Hijo de Pirata Morgan	Rey del Ring	Won the Rey del Ring match.
October 16	Hell Boy	IWRG Thursday Night Wrestling	This was a Winner Takes All match also for Hell Boy's IWRG Mexico Championship.

IWRG Rey del Aire Championship
Incoming champion – Spider Fly
Date	Winner	Event/Show	Note(s)
August 17	Aguila Roja	Ruleta de la Muerte	This was the final of the Ruleta de la Muerte. This was also a Winner Takes All match where Roja's IWRG Intercontinental Lightweight Championship was also on the line.
October 30	Hysteriosis	El Castillo del Terror	

IWRG Mexico Championship
Incoming champion – Hell Boy
No title changes.

Distrito Federal Trios Championship
Incoming champions – El Infierno Eterno (Demonio Infernal, Eterno, and Lunatic Extreme)
No title changes.

=== JCW ===
JCW Heavyweight Championship
Incoming champion – Willie Mack
Date	Winner	Event/Show	Note(s)
April 25 (aired May 22)	Kerry Morton	JCW Lunacy	
June 19 (aired July 17)	Mad Man Pondo	JCW Lunacy	
July 17	Matt Tremont	GCW/JCW Showcase Showdown: The Violence is Right	Co-promoted with Game Changer Wrestling (GCW). This was a deathmatch.
August 15	2 Tuff Tony	GCW vs. JCW: The 2 Day War; Night 2	Co-promoted with Game Changer Wrestling (GCW). This was an Exploding Barbed Wire Deathmatch.
October 31 (aired January 1, 2026)	Matt Cardona	JCW Lunacy: Hallowicked	Cardona won the title under the alias "The Mysterious Carnival of Carnage."

JCW Women's Championship
Incoming champion – Dani Mo
Date	Winner	Event/Show	Note(s)
April 26 (aired May 29)	Alice Crowley	JCW Lunacy	This was a three-way match also involving Sonny Kiss.
September 18 (aired October 30)	"HollyHood" Haley J	JCW Lunacy: 2 Tuff Country	

JCW American Championship
Incoming champion – 2 Tuff Tony
Date	Winner	Event/Show	Note(s)
March 6 (aired March 27)	Caleb Konley	JCW Lunacy	
October 29 (aired December 18)	Ninja Mack	JCW Lunacy	

JCW Battle Royal Championship
(Title created)
Date	Winner	Event/Show	Note(s)
March 8 (aired April 17)	Ricky Morton	JCW Lunacy	Won a 13-man battle royal by last eliminating Kerry Morton to become the inaugural champion.
September 18 (aired October 30)	Kerry Morton	JCW Lunacy: 2 Tuff Country	This was a 2 Tuff Country Rumble. Kerry last eliminated Ricky to win the match and the title.

JCW Tag Team Championship
Incoming champions – The Backseat Boyz (JP Grayson and Tommy Grayson)
Date	Winner	Event/Show	Note(s)
February 15 (aired March 20)	Colby Corino and Shane Mercer	JCW Lunacy	
March 6	Vacated	–	Corino and Mercer were stripped of the titles due to a lack of defenses.
March 8 (aired April 10)	Brothers of Funstruction (Yabo the Clown and Ruffo the Clown)	JCW Lunacy	Defeated The Backseat Boyz (JP Grayson and Tommy Grayson) in a tournament final to win the vacant titles.
August 14	YDNP (Alec Price and Jordan Oliver)	GCW vs. JCW: The 2 Day War; Night 2	Co-promoted with Game Changer Wrestling (GCW). This was a Winner Takes All match where YDNP's GCW Tag Team Championship was also on the line.
September 12	Brothers of Funstruction (Yabo the Clown and Ruffo the Clown)	GCW Evil Deeds	This was a Game Changer Wrestling (GCW) event. This was a Winner Takes All Riddlebox match also for YDNP's GCW Tag Team Championship.
October 31 (aired January 1, 2026)	The Outbreak (Jacksyn Crowley and Abel Booker)	JCW Lunacy: Hallowicked	
November 22 (aired January 8, 2026)	Brothers of Funstruction (Yabo the Clown and Ruffo the Clown)	JCW Lunacy	

=== JTO ===
King of JTO
Incoming champion – Fire Katsumi
Date	Winner	Event/Show	Note(s)
July 11	Thunder Masami	JTO 6th Anniversary	
December 28	Ryuya Takekura	Final Show of the Year	This was a three-way match also involving Ibuki.

JTO Openweight Championship
Incoming champion – Genta Yubari
Date	Winner	Event/Show	Note(s)
October 4	Ibuki	JTO Special	

Queen of JTO
Incoming champion – Sumika Yanagawa
Date	Winner	Event/Show	Note(s)
March 2	Tomoka Inaba	Girls Special in Osaka	
July 11	Azusa Inaba	JTO 6th Anniversary	

JTO Girls Championship
Incoming champion – Azusa Inaba
Date	Winner	Event/Show	Note(s)
December 28	Mirai	Final Show of the Year	

JTO Tag Team Championship
Incoming champions – Myo-o (Ibuki and Miyamasa)
Date	Winner	Event/Show	Note(s)
January 10	Carbell Ito and Arata	Hatsu	This was a four-way tag team match also involving Naoya Akama and Ara, and Bomber Tatsuya and Thunder Masami.
May 5	Myo-o (Ibuki and Miyamasa)	JTO House	
July 11	Minoru Suzuki and Genta Yubari	JTO 6th Anniversary	Defeated Keita and Ryoma Tsukamoto, who subbed in for Myo-o teammates Ibuki and Miyamasa.
September 12	Myo-o (Ibuki and Miyamasa)	JTO in Hiroshima	
November 8	Bomber Tatsuya and Keita	West Japan Tour; Night 3	
December 28	Myo-o (Genta Yubari and Miyamasa)	Final Show of the Year	

JTO Girls Tag Team Championship
Incoming champions – Aoi and Tomoka Inaba
Date	Winner	Event/Show	Note(s)
February 22	1111 (Misa Kagura and Sumika Yanagawa)	Special TokyoSquare in Itabashi	
April 25	Akane Fujita and Rhythm	Bell Epoque	
May 5	Aoi and Azusa Inaba	JTO Girls	
June 22	1111 (Misa Kagura and Sumika Yanagawa)	JTO	
August 11	Tomoka Inaba and Rhythm	JTO Special	

UWA World Middleweight Championship
Incoming champion – Bomber Tatsuya
Date	Winner	Event/Show	Note(s)
January 25	Akira Jumonji	JTO Saturday Fight	
June 8	Bomber Tatsuya	JTO House	
August 11	Naoya Akama	JTO Special	

Independent World Junior Heavyweight Championship
Incoming champion – Hikaru Sato
Date	Winner	Event/Show	Note(s)
August 11	Akira Jumonji	JTO Special	This was a three-way match also involving Carbell Ito.

=== Marigold ===
Marigold World Championship
Incoming champion – Sareee
Date	Winner	Event/Show	Note(s)
January 3	Utami Hayashishita	First Dream	
October 26	Miku Aono	Grand Destiny	

Marigold United National Championship
Incoming champion – Miku Aono
Date	Winner	Event/Show	Note(s)
January 3	Mai Sakurai	First Dream	
October 26	Victoria Yuzuki	Grand Destiny	

Marigold Super Fly Championship
Incoming champion – Natsumi Showzuki
Date	Winner	Event/Show	Note(s)
January 3	Victoria Yuzuki	First Dream	
May 24	Mayu Iwatani	Shine Forever	

Marigold Twin Star Championship
Incoming champions – Dark Wolf Army (Nagisa Nozaki and Chiaki)
Date	Winner	Event/Show	Note(s)
January 3	Bozilla and Tank	First Dream	
January 19	Nanae Takahashi and Seri Yamaoka	New Year's Golden Garden; Night 2	
May 10	Magenta (Riko Kawahata and Maria)	Rising Spirit; Night 9	
October 26	Darkness Revolution (Misa Matsui and Chiaki)	Grand Destiny	

GHC Women's Championship
Co-promoted with Pro Wrestling Noah
Incoming champion – Kouki Amarei
Date	Winner	Event/Show	Note(s)
June 2	Takumi Iroha	Noah Monday Magic Prime Time Season #2	This was a Pro Wrestling Noah event.

=== Marvelous ===
AAAW Single Championship
Incoming champion – Takumi Iroha
No title changes.

AAAW Tag Team Championship
Incoming champion – Bob Bob Momo Banana (Mio Momono and Yurika Oka)
Date	Winner	Event/Show	Note(s)
February 9	H2D (Ryo Mizunami and Sonoko Kato)	Oz Academy Angels of The Abyss	This was an Oz Academy show.
May 20	Spark Jump (Sareee and Takumi Iroha)	Marvelous	
December 28	Magenta (Maria and Riko)	Marvelous	

=== MLP ===
PWA Champions Grail
Co-promoted with Oceania Pro Wrestling and Qatar Pro Wrestling
Incoming champion – Rohan Raja
No title changes.

MLP Canadian Championship
(Title introduced)
Date	Winner	Event/Show	Note(s)
May 10	Josh Alexander	Northern Rising	Last eliminated Matt Cardona in a 20-man Gauntlet for the Gold to become the inaugural champion.

MLP Canadian Women's Championship
(Title introduced)
Date	Winner	Event/Show	Note(s)
May 10	Gisele Shaw	Northern Rising	Defeated Kylie Rae in a tournament final to become the inaugural champion.

=== MLW ===
MLW World Heavyweight Championship
Incoming champion – Satoshi Kojima
Date	Winner	Event/Show	Note(s)
January 11	Matt Riddle	Kings of Colosseum	
September 13	Mads Krule Krügger	Fightland	This was Krügger's Gravity Gamble cash-in match, which was originally a singles match between Riddle and Donovan Dijak, but converted into a three-way match after Krügger cashed in his contract before the match.

MLW World Women's Featherweight Championship
Incoming champion – Janai Kai
Date	Winner	Event/Show	Note(s)
January 11	Delmi Exo	Kings of Colosseum	This was a Title vs. Hair match.
April 5	Shoko Nakajima	Battle Riot VII	

MLW World Middleweight Championship
Incoming champion – Místico
Date	Winner	Event/Show	Note(s)
April 5	Vacated	Battle Riot VII	Místico vacated the championship after announcing his intention to move up to the heavyweight division.
September 13	Templario	Fightland	Defeated Ikuro Kwon to win the vacant title.

MLW National Openweight Championship
Incoming champion – Matthew Justice
Date	Winner	Event/Show	Note(s)
May 2	Último Guerrero	CMLL vs. MLW	Co-promoted with Consejo Mundial de Lucha Libre (CMLL).
September 21	Blue Panther	CMLL Domingo Familiar	This was a Consejo Mundial de Lucha Libre (CMLL) event.

MLW World Tag Team Championship
Incoming champions – CozyMax (Satoshi Kojima and Shigeo Okumura)
Date	Winner	Event/Show	Note(s)
May 2	Los Depredadores (Magnus and Rugido)	CMLL vs. MLW	Co-promoted with Consejo Mundial de Lucha Libre (CMLL).
June 26	The Skyscrapers (Donovan Dijak and Bishop Dyer)	Summer of the Beasts	

=== M-Pro ===
Tohoku Junior Heavyweight Championship
Incoming champion – El Pantera Jr.
Date	Winner	Event/Show	Note(s)
May 4 (aired May 9)	Yasutaka Oosera	Golden Week Series; Night 3	
July 19 (aired July 22)	Pantera Jr.	Shobi no Kyu	

Tohoku Tag Team Championship
Incoming champions – Rasse and Ringo Yamaya
Date	Winner	Event/Show	Note(s)
September 14	Vacated	–	Vacated after Yamaya suffered an injury.
November 2 (aired November 9)	Demonios (Arashi and Yasutaka Oosera)	Grande Uno	Defeated Musashi and Rasse to win the vacant titles.

=== NJPW ===
IWGP World Heavyweight Championship
Incoming champion – Zack Sabre Jr.
Date	Winner	Event/Show	Note(s)
February 11	Hirooki Goto	The New Beginning in Osaka	
June 29	Zack Sabre Jr.	Tanahashi Jam	
October 13	Konosuke Takeshita	King of Pro-Wrestling	

IWGP Global Heavyweight Championship
Incoming champion – David Finlay
Date	Winner	Event/Show	Note(s)
January 4	Yota Tsuji	Wrestle Kingdom 19	
June 15	Gabe Kidd	Dominion 6.15 in Osaka-jo Hall	
October 13	Yota Tsuji	King of Pro-Wrestling	

IWGP Junior Heavyweight Championship
Incoming champion – Douki
Date	Winner	Event/Show	Note(s)
January 4	El Desperado	Wrestle Kingdom 19	Won the title via referee stoppage after Douki suffered an arm injury.
October 6	Douki	Road to King of Pro-Wrestling; Night 2	

IWGP Women's Championship
Incoming champion – Mayu Iwatani
Co-promoted with World Wonder Ring Stardom
Date	Winner	Event/Show	Note(s)
April 27	Syuri	Stardom All Star Grand Queendom	
June 21	Sareee	Stardom The Conversion	
October 13	Syuri	King of Pro-Wrestling	

IWGP Tag Team Championship
Incoming champions – Vacant
Date	Winner	Event/Show	Note(s)
January 5	The Young Bucks (Matthew Jackson and Nicholas Jackson)	Wrestle Dynasty	Defeated United Empire (Great-O-Khan and Jeff Cobb) and Los Ingobernables de Japon (Tetsuya Naito and Hiromu Takahashi) in a three-way tag team match to win the vacant titles.
February 11	Los Ingobernables de Japon (Tetsuya Naito and Hiromu Takahashi)	The New Beginning in Osaka	
April 5	United Empire (Jeff Cobb and Callum Newman)	Sakura Genesis	
April 14	Vacated	–	The titles were vacated after Jeff Cobb left NJPW.
April 26	United Empire (Great-O-Khan and Callum Newman)	Wrestling Redzone	Defeated Bishamon (Hirooki Goto and Yoshi-Hashi) to win the vacant titles.
June 15	Tomohiro Ishii and Taichi	Dominion 6.15 in Osaka-jo Hall	
September 28	Knock Out Brothers (Yuto-Ice and Oskar)	Destruction in Kobe	

IWGP Junior Heavyweight Tag Team Championship
Incoming champions – Intergalactic Jet Setters (Kushida and Kevin Knight)
Date	Winner	Event/Show	Note(s)
January 4	Ichiban Sweet Boys (Robbie Eagles and Kosei Fujita)	Wrestle Kingdom 19	This was a four-way Tokyo Terror ladder match also involving Catch 2/2 (TJP and Francesco Akira) and Bullet Club War Dogs (Clark Connors and Drilla Moloney).
April 29	Master Wato and Yoh	Hizen no Kuni	
June 15	House of Torture (Sho and Douki)	Dominion 6.15 in Osaka-jo Hall	

NEVER Openweight Championship
Incoming champion – Shingo Takagi
Date	Winner	Event/Show	Note(s)
January 4	Konosuke Takeshita	Wrestle Kingdom 19	This was a Winner Takes All match, where Takeshita's AEW International Championship was also on the line.
June 15	Boltin Oleg	Dominion 6.15 in Osaka-jo Hall	
October 13	Evil	King of Pro-Wrestling	

NEVER Openweight 6-Man Tag Team Championship
Incoming champions – Boltin Oleg and Be-Bop Tag Team (Hiroshi Tanahashi and Toru Yano)
Date	Winner	Event/Show	Note(s)
January 30	House of Torture (Ren Narita, Sho and Yujiro Takahashi)	Road to the New Beginning; Night 3	Narita, Sho and Takahashi held the titles as a Bullet Club contingent under the House of Torture subgroup until May 3, at Wrestling Dontaku where the latter split up from Bullet Club to act as a separate unit.
July 4	Toru Yano and Spiritech (Master Wato and Yoh	New Japan Soul; Night 8	

NJPW World Television Championship
Incoming champion – Ren Narita
Date	Winner	Event/Show	Note(s)
January 4	El Phantasmo	Wrestle Kingdom 19	This was a four-way match also involving Jeff Cobb and Ryohei Oiwa.
April 5	Great-O-Khan	Sakura Genesis	Won by countout.
April 29	El Phantasmo	Hizen no Kuni	

Strong Openweight Championship
Incoming champion – Gabe Kidd
Date	Winner	Event/Show	Note(s)
April 11	Tomohiro Ishii	Windy City Riot	This was a 30-minute iron man match. Ishii won 2–1 in sudden-death overtime.

Strong Women's Championship
Incoming champion – Mercedes Moné
Co-promoted with World Wonder Ring Stardom
Date	Winner	Event/Show	Note(s)
May 9	AZM	Resurgence	This was a three-way match also involving Mina Shirakawa.
September 27	Saya Kamitani	Stardom	This was a Winner Takes All match also for Kamitani's World of Stardom Championship.

Strong Openweight Tag Team Championship
Incoming champions – World Class Wrecking Crew (Jorel Nelson and Royce Isaacs)
Date	Winner	Event/Show	Note(s)
May 9	United Empire (TJP and Templario)	Resurgence	
November 14	Los Hermanos Chavez (Ángel de Oro and Niebla Roja)	CMLL x Linkin Park: Noche from Zero	This was a Consejo Mundial de Lucha Libre (CMLL) event.

Tamashii Tag Team Championship
(Title introduced)
Date	Winner	Event/Show	Note(s)
July 4	The Pretty Boys (Magic Mark and Pretty Richie)	Tamashii: Cold War	Defeated Young Blood (Oskar Leube and Yuto Nakashima) in a tournament final to become the inaugural champions.

=== NWA ===
NWA Worlds Heavyweight Championship
Incoming champion – Thom Latimer
Date	Winner	Event/Show	Note(s)
August 16 (aired November 18)	Silas Mason	NWA 77th Anniversary Show	

NWA World Women's Championship
Incoming champion – Kenzie Paige
Date	Winner	Event/Show	Note(s)
August 16 (aired November 11)	Natalia Markova	NWA 77th Anniversary Show	

NWA National Heavyweight Championship
Incoming champion – Mims
Date	Winner	Event/Show	Note(s)
August 16 (aired November 4)	Mike Mondo	NWA 77th Anniversary Show	

NWA World Junior Heavyweight Championship
Incoming champion – Alex Taylor
Date	Winner	Event/Show	Note(s)
October 17 (aired January 20, 2026)	Spencer Slade	Samhain: Part 3	

NWA Mid-America Heavyweight Championship
Incoming champion – Jeremiah Plunkett
No title changes.

NWA World Television Championship
Incoming champion – Carson Bartholomew Drake
Date	Winner	Event/Show	Note(s)
March 22 (aired July 8)	Vacated	Hard Times V	Drake vacated the title to challenge Thom Latimer for the NWA Worlds Heavyweight Championship that night as part of the "Lucky Seven Rule."
May 17 (aired July 29)	Bryan Idol	Crockett Cup	Defeated Carson Bartholomew Drake to win the vacant title.

NWA World Women's Television Championship
Incoming champion – Big Mama
Date	Winner	Event/Show	Note(s)
February 2 (aired May 13)	Tiffany Nieves	NWA Powerrr	

NWA World Tag Team Championship
Incoming champions – Knox and Murdoch
Date	Winner	Event/Show	Note(s)
August 16 (aired November 18)	The Immortals (Kratos and Odinson)	NWA 77th Anniversary Show	

NWA World Women's Tag Team Championship
Incoming champions – Kenzie Paige and Big Mama
Date	Winner	Event/Show	Note(s)
March 22 (aired June 24)	TV-MA (Tiffany Nieves and Valentina Rossi)	Hard Times V	
September 5	Vacated	NWA Powerrr Taping	The titles were vacated due to Rossi being unavailable to defend them as she was on a tour of Japan.
October 17 (aired January 20, 2026)	TV-MA (Tiffany Nieves and Valentina Rossi)	Samhain: Part 3	Defeated The Hex (Allysin Kay and Marti Belle) to win the vacant titles.
December 13 (aired February 10, 2026)	The Hex (Allysin Kay and Marti Belle)	NWA Powerrr	

NWA United States Tag Team Championship
Incoming champions – The Country Gentlemen (AJ Cazana and KC Cazana)
Date	Winner	Event/Show	Note(s)
March 22 (aired June 24)	The Southern Six (Kerry Morton and Alex Taylor)	Hard Times V	
September 5 (aired December 16)	The Slimeballz (Sage Chantz and Tommy Rant)	NWA Powerrr	This was a handicap match. Taylor was not medically cleared to compete, so Morton had to defend the titles alone.

=== Osaka Pro ===
Osaka Pro Wrestling Championship
Incoming champion – Toru
Date	Winner	Event/Show	Note(s)
December 7	Ryuya Matsufusa	Excalibur	

Osaka Light Heavyweight Championship
Incoming champion – Ryuya Matsufusa
Date	Winner	Event/Show	Note(s)
Januury 12 (aired January 14)	Yasutaka Oosera	New Year Special; Night 2	
December 7	Ultimate Spider Jr.	Excalibur	

Osaka Meibutsu Sekaiichi Championship
Incoming champion – Joichiro Osaka
Date	Winner	Event/Show	Note(s)
June 15	Ebessan III	Castle Festival	
December 7	Takoyakida	Excalibur	This was a three-way match also involving Billyken Kid.

Osaka Tag Team Championship
Incoming champions – Quiet Storm and Shigehiro Irie
Date	Winner	Event/Show	Note(s)
June 15	Rogue Nation (Shu Asakawa and Goliath)	Castle Festival	
December 7	Aran Sano and Tigers Mask	Excalibur	

=== OVW ===
OVW Heavyweight Championship
Incoming champion – Mt. Kadeem
Date	Winner	Event/Show	Note(s)
June 12	Vacated	OVW TV	Kadeem announced unforeseen health concerns and vacated the title.
July 1 (aired July 3)	Kal Herro	OVW TV: Independence Rage	Defeated Crixus in a tournament final to win the vacant title.
December 12	Dustin Jackson	OVW TV	Herro was forced to relinquish the title to Jackson after attacking him, violating an agreement with OVW management.

OVW National Heavyweight Championship
Incoming champion – EC3
Date	Winner	Event/Show	Note(s)
January 4	Doug Basham	Nightmare Rumble	This was Basham's Key of Opportunity match, which was originally a singles match between ED3 and Ca$h Flo, but was converted into a three-way match after Basham invoked his opportunity mid-match.
April 24	Erik Surge	OVW TV	
May 8	Deactivated	OVW TV	OVW executive Al Snow awarded Surge with the new OVW United States Heavyweight Championship, replacing the National Heavyweight title.

OVW United States Heavyweight Championship
(Title introduced)
Date	Winner	Event/Show	Note(s)
May 8	Erik Surge	OVW TV	OVW executive Al Snow awarded OVW National Heavyweight Champion Surge with the new OVW United States Heavyweight Championship, replacing the National Heavyweight title.
September 28	Big Zo / Dr. Zo	No Rest for The Wicked	During this reign, Big Zo changed his ring name to Dr. Zo.

OVW Media Championship
Incoming champion – Dustin Jackson
Date	Winner	Event/Show	Note(s)
June 5	Vacated	OVW TV	Jackson had to forfeit the title after being attacked by The Revolution the previous week.
June 5	Anthony Catena	OVW TV	Defeated Anthony Toatele to win the vacant title
August 17	Jake Lawless	Fight Night	This was a four-way ladder match also involving Anthony Toatele and Dustin Jackson. Ca$h Flo served as the special guest referee.

OVW Rush Division Championship
Incoming champion – Star Rider
Date	Winner	Event/Show	Note(s)
January 4	Super Z	Nightmare Rumble	
May 15	The Obsidian Angel	OVW TV	
May 22	Vacated	OVW TV	The Obsidian Angel attempted to award the title to Star Rider after defeating Super Z. Due to this, OVW executives declared the title vacant.
June 14	Stephen Steele	Hard Reset	Won an "Open Invitational" ladder match to win the vacant title. Other participants included Brandon Davis, Chris Exodus, Elijah Eros, Evil Z, Icon Lee, Jake Painter, JJ Lawson, Jota Peso, Justice Davis, Maximo Suave, The Obsidian Angel, Showtime Shanklin, Thomas Heim, and Truth Magnum.
October 30	Brandon Davis	OVW TV: Hell Night	Linda Kay acted as the special guest referee.
December 21	Jota Peso	Christmas Chaos	This was an eight-man gauntlet match also involving Brendan Balling, Elijah Eros, Icon Lee, JJ Lawson, Kirko Ky, and Showtime Shanklin. Peso pinned Ky to win the title.

OVW Women's Championship
Incoming champion – J-Rod
Date	Winner	Event/Show	Note(s)
March 29	Sophia Rose	March Mayhem	
July 1 (aired July 3)	Freya the Slaya	OVW TV: Independence Rage	
December 21	Leela Feist	Christmas Chaos	

OVW Tag Team Championship
Incoming champions – Beaches and Cream (Luscious Lawrence and Omar Amir)
Date	Winner	Event/Show	Note(s)
March 29	Vacated	March Mayhem	The titles were vacated after Beaches and Cream were unavailable to defend the titles
March 29	Loud and Lawless (Jake Lawless and Von Rockit)	March Mayhem	Defeated The Revolution (AJZ and Leo Fox) to win the vacant titles.
May 8	The Trifecta (Ashton Adonis and Brandon Barretta)	OVW TV	
August 11	Donovan Cecil and Jack Vaughn	Fight Night	
August 21	The Trifecta (Ashton Adonis and Brandon Barretta)	OVW TV	
September 11	Vacated	OVW TV Live	On September 4, Level 3 (Jay Three & Kirko Ky) defeated The Trifecta in a non-sanctioned title match. As a result, OVW executive Al Snow vacated the titles.
September 28	Anthony Toatele and Dustin Jackson	No Rest for The Wicked	Defeated Los Desafios (Jota Peso and Maximo Suave) in the final of the Nightmare Cup to win the vacant titles.
October 23	Los Desafios (Jota Peso and Maximo Suave)	OVW TV	
October 30	Donovan Cecil and Jack Vaughn	OVW TV: Hell Night	This was a Hateful Eight match also involving Anthony Toatele and Dustin Jackson, and Z Force (Super Z and Kid Colossus).
November 22 aired November 27)	The Evans Family (Tony Evans and Drew Hernandez)	OVW TV: Thanksgiving Thunder	Defeated Cecil and Jay DeNiro, who subbed in for Vaughn.
December 4	Donovan Cecil and Jack Vaughn	OVW TV	

=== Oz Academy ===
Oz Academy Openweight Championship
Incoming champion – Ryo Mizunami
Date	Winner	Event/Show	Note(s)
April 13	Saori Anou	Battle Big Bonus	

Oz Academy Tag Team Championship
Incoming champion – FWC (Hazuki and Koguma)
Date	Winner	Event/Show	Note(s)
April 13	Phantom Limit (Kohaku and Tsubasa Kuragaki)	Battle Big Bonus	
August 17	Gojizones United (Hiroyo Matsumoto and Zones)	Plum no Hanasaku Oz no Kuni	

Oz Academy Pioneer 3-Way Championship
Incoming champion – Mayumi Ozaki
Date	Winner	Event/Show	Note(s)
March 20	Vacated	–	Ozaki was stripped of the title due to being unavailable to defend it.
April 13	Kakeru	Battle Big Bonus	Defeated Itsuki Aoki and Ram Kaicho to win the vacant title.
November 16	Sonoko Kato	Battle Big Bonus in Okinawa	This was a three-way match also involving Akino.
November 23	Vacated	Sonoko Kato Retirement ~ Final Blue Dragon	Kato relinquished the title due to her retirement.

=== Prestige ===
Prestige World Championship
Incoming champion – Alan Angels
Date	Winner	Event/Show	Note(s)
July 13	Judas Icarus	Combat Clash	This was a Steel Cage match.
October 5 (aired October 14)	Kevin Blackwood	Roseland XII	

Prestige Tag Team Championship
Incoming champions – Sinner and Saint (Judas Icarus and Travis Williams)
Date	Winner	Event/Show	Note(s)
January 11	UltraPOWER! (Amira and Jaiden)	Roseland X	
April 12	Midnight Heat (Ricky Gibson and Eddie Pearl)	Roseland XI	

=== Progress ===
Progress World Championship
Incoming champion – Luke Jacobs
Date	Winner	Event/Show	Note(s)
August 25	Man Like DeReiss	Chapter 183: Hundred Volts	This was a Tables, Ladders, and Chairs match

Progress World Women's Championship
Incoming champion – Nina Samuels
Date	Winner	Event/Show	Note(s)
May 4	Rhio	Super Strong Style 16; Night 1	This was a Title vs. PROGRESS Career match, where Kanji served as special guest referee.
October 26	Rayne Leverkusen	Chapter 185: Jump In The Line	

Progress Atlas Championship
Incoming champion – Axel Tischer
Date	Winner	Event/Show	Note(s)
July 27	Mike D Vecchio	Chapter 182: Stay Humble	This was a tables match.
August 25	Gene Munny	Chapter 183: Hundred Volts	This was a three-way match also involving Will Kroos.
September 28	Will Kroos	Chapter 184: Camden Lock Up	

Progress Proteus Championship
Incoming champion – Simon Miller
Date	Winner	Event/Show	Note(s)
April 17	Paul Walter Hauser	Chapter 179: Progress Las Vegas	This was a five-way scramble, also involving Adam Priest, Effy, and Charles Crowley.

Progress Tag Team Championship
Incoming champions – Smokin' Aces (Charlie Sterling and Nick Riley)
Date	Winner	Event/Show	Note(s)
March 30	Sunshine Machine (Chuck Mambo and TK Cooper)	Chapter 178: Fix Your Hearts	Had Sunshine Machine lost, they would never team in Progress Wrestling again.
June 28	Lykos Gym (Kid Lykos and Kid Lykos II)	Chapter 181: Far From Ordinary People	
October 26	Diamond Eyes (Connor Mills, Nico Angelo, and Jay Joshua)	Chapter 185: Jump In The Line	This was a three-way ladder match also involving Sunshine Machine (Chuck Mambo and TK Cooper). Mills and Angelo originally won the titles, but all three members defended thhm under the Freebird Rule.

=== Pure-J ===
Pure-J Openweight Championship
Incoming champion – Rydeen Hagane
Date	Winner	Event/Show	Note(s)
May 6	Saki	Maniax	

Princess of Pro-Wrestling Championship
Incoming champion – Honoka
No title changes.

KSR Championship
Incoming champion – Momo Tani
Date	Winner	Event/Show	Note(s)
January 19	Flying Penguin	Osaka Festival ~ Winter Battle	

Daily Sports Women's Tag Team Championship
Incoming champion – Creakari (Akari and Crea)
Date	Winner	Event/Show	Note(s)
May 6	Rice Leo (Kaori Yoneyama and Leon)	Maniax	
July 20	Manahi (Moeka Haruhi and Yuna Manase)	Pure Spirit Vol. 3	
August 11	Kobayashi Group (Hanako Nakamori and Kaho Kobayashi)	Rainbow Mountain ~ PURE-J 8th Anniversary	

=== PWG ===
PWG World Championship
Incoming champion – Daniel Garcia
No title changes.

PWG World Tag Team Championship
Incoming champions – Kings of the Black Throne (Malakai Black and Brody King)
Date	Winner	Event/Show	Note(s)
April 25	Vacated	–	Vacated after Black re-signed with WWE.

=== RevPro ===
Undisputed British Heavyweight Championship
Incoming champions – Michael Oku
Date	Winner	Event/Show	Note(s)
July 25	Ricky Knight Jr.	Summer Sizzler	
August 23	Sha Samuels	RevPro 13th Anniversary Show; Night 2	This was a Title vs. Career match.
December 14	Jay Joshua	Uprising	

Undisputed British Women's Championship
Incoming champion – Mina Shirakawa
Date	Winner	Event/Show	Note(s)
January 5	Mercedes Moné	Wrestle Dynasty	This was a Winner Takes All match where Moné's Strong Women's Championship was also on the line.
December 17	Alex Windsor	AEW Collision: Holiday Bash; Show 2	First time the title changed hands at an All Elite Wrestling (AEW) show. This was an open challenge.

Undisputed British Cruiserweight Championship
Incoming champion – Will Kaven
Date	Winner	Event/Show	Note(s)
June 22	Nino Bryant	Revolution Rumble	
December 7	Joe Lando	Live in London 102	

Undisputed British Tag Team Championship
Incoming champions – Jay Joshua and Connor Mills
Date	Winner	Event/Show	Note(s)
March 16	Young Guns (Ethan Allen and Luke Jacobs)	Epic Encounter	

=== REVOLVER ===
REVOLVER World Championship
Incoming champions – Myron Reed
No title changes.

REVOLVER Remix Championship
Incoming champion – Jake Something
Date	Winner	Event/Show	Note(s)
January 29	Vacated	–	Something vacated the title after suffering a torn bicep.
January 31	Crash Jaxon	Square Game	Defeated Dex Royal, Brayden Lee, Jeffery John, Dark Pledge, and Leon Ruffin in a six-way scramble to win the vacant title.
May 18	Jake Crist	Let Us Cook	
June 14	A. J. Francis	Cage of Horror 4	
October 3	BDE	Tales from The Ring 8	This was BDE's Golden Ticket match.
November 21	Chris Danger	WrestleKombat	Co-promoted with ARRIVAL Wrestling.

REVOLVER Texas Championship
(Title introduced)
Date	Winner	Event/Show	Note(s)
June 28	Brick Savage	Texas Title Tournament	Defeated JD Griffey in a tournament final to become the inaugural champion.
August 1	JD Griffey	VIP Killin' Da Business 2	This was a VIP Wrestling event.
September 18	Vacated	–	Griffey vacated the title due to suffering an injury.
September 27	KJ Orso	Redemption	Defeated Brick Savage to win the vacant title.

REVOLVER Scramble Championship
(Title reintroduced)
Date	Winner	Event/Show	Note(s)
October 3	Bigg Pound	Tales from The Ring 8	Defeated Action Braxton, Amazonga, Jeffery John, Joe Alonzo, Juni Underwood, and KC Jacobs in a Sudden Death Scramble to win the vacant title. The title had been inactive since 2020. During this reign, it was renamed to the REVOLVER 24/7 Scramble Championship.
December 18	Rachel Armstrong	Holiday Special	This was a six-way scramble also involving Harley Rock, Jeffrey John, Juni Underwood, Phil Shark, and Sway Archer.
December 18	Bigg Pound	Holiday Special	
December 18	Johnnie Crist	Holiday Special	
December 18	Bigg Pound	Holiday Special	Johnnie voluntarily relinquished the title back to Pound.

REVOVLER Tag Team Championship
Incoming champions – Alpha Sigma Sigma (Brent Oakley and KC Jacobs)
Date	Winner	Event/Show	Note(s)
March 22	The Macabre (Krule, Dreadknot, and Alan Angels)	Goated	Krule and Dreadknot originally won the titles, but Angels would fill in for Krule during title matches due to the latter's injuries.
May 18	Alpha Sigma Sigma (Brent Oakley and KC Jacobs)	Let Us Cook	Dreadknot and Angels represented The Macabre.
June 14	The Macabre (Krule, Dreadknot, and Alan Angels)	Cage of Horror 4	This was a Frat House Rules six-man tag team match where Dick Meyers teamed with Alpha Sigma Sigma. The Macabre would defend the titles under the Freebird Rule.
September 6	Latino's Most Wanted (Koda Hernandez and Sabin Gauge)	Clean Slate	Krule and Dreadknot represented The Macabre.
December 13	The Rascalz (Dezmond Xavier and Zachary Wentz)	Season Finale	

=== ROH ===
ROH World Championship
Incoming champion – Chris Jericho
Date	Winner	Event/Show	Note(s)
April 6	Bandido	AEW Dynasty	This was an All Elite Wrestling (AEW) event. This was a Title vs. Mask match.

ROH Women's World Championship
Incoming champion – Athena
No title changes.

ROH World Television Championship
Incoming champion – Komander
Date	Winner	Event/Show	Note(s)
April 17	Nick Wayne	AEW Collision: Spring BreakThru	This was an All Elite Wrestling (AEW) event.

ROH Women's World Television Championship
Incoming champion – Red Velvet
Date	Winner	Event/Show	Note(s)
July 11	Mina Shirakawa	Supercard of Honor	Lineal champion Red Velvet was unable to compete at this event due to injury. Shirakawa defeated Miyu Yamashita, Persephone, and Yuka Sakazaki in a four-way match to be crowned interim champion.
October 18	Mercedes Moné	AEW WrestleDream	This was an All Elite Wrestling (AEW) show. Defeated interim champion Mina Shirakawa in a Winner Takes All open challenge in which Moné also defended her AEW TBS Championship.
November 19	Mercedes Moné	AEW Collision	This was an All Elite Wrestling (AEW) show. Defeated lineal champion Red Velvet to determine the undisputed ROH Women's World Television Champion. This is officially recognized as the end of Velvet's reign and the start of Moné's.
December 5	Red Velvet	Final Battle	

ROH Pure Championship
Incoming champion – Lee Moriarty
No title changes.

ROH Women's Pure Championship
(Title introduced)
Date	Winner	Event/Show	Note(s)
December 5	Deonna Purrazzo	Final Battle	Defeated Billie Starkz in a tournament final to become the inaugural champion.

ROH World Tag Team Championship
Incoming champions – The Sons of Texas (Dustin Rhodes and Sammy Guevara)
Date	Winner	Event/Show	Note(s)
August 28	Vacated	–	The titles were vacated after Rhodes underwent double knee replacement surgery.
August 29	La Facción Ingobernable (Rush and Sammy Guevara)	Death Before Dishonor	Defeated The Outrunners (Turbo Floyd and Truth Magnum) to win the vacant titles.
November 28	Vacated	Ring of Honor Wrestling	The titles were vacated after Rush suffered a knee injury.
December 5	La Facción Ingobernable (Sammy Guevara and The Beast Mortos)	Final Battle	Defeated Adam Priest and "Dynamite Kid" Tommy Billington to win the vacant titles.

ROH World Six-Man Tag Team Championship
Incoming champions – The Sons of Texas (Dustin Rhodes and Marshall and Ross Von Erich)
Date	Winner	Event/Show	Note(s)
August 28	Vacated	–	The titles were vacated after Rhodes underwent double knee replacement surgery.
August 29	Shane Taylor Promotions (Shane Taylor, Carlie Bravo, and Capt. Shawn Dean)	Death Before Dishonor	Defeated The Sons of Texas (Sammy Guevara and Marshall and Ross Von Erich) to win the vacant titles.

=== Seadlinnng ===
Beyond the Sea Single Championship
Incoming champion – Sareee
Date	Winner	Event/Show	Note(s)
January 17	Veny	Shin-Kiba Series Vol. 1	
June 17	Makoto	Early Summer Games!	
August 22	Hiroyo Matsumoto	Seadlinnng 20th Anniversary	

Beyond the Sea Tag Team Championship
Incoming champion – Ayame Sasamura and Itsuki Aoki
Date	Winner	Event/Show	Note(s)
August 22	Mio Shirai and Natsu Sumire	Seadlinnng 20th Anniversary	
December 26	Colorful Bouquet Toss (Unagi Sayaka and Honori Hana)	Final Battle!	

=== Senjo ===
Sendai Girls World Championship
Incoming champion – Meiko Satomura
Date	Winner	Event/Show	Note(s)
March 19	Chihiro Hashimoto	The Top of Joshi Wrestling	

Sendai Girls Junior Championship
Incoming champion – Chi Chi
Date	Winner	Event/Show	Note(s)
March 19	Aya Sakura	The Top of Joshi Wrestling	
August 24	Yuna	Senjo The Biggest	

Sendai Girls Tag Team Championship
Incoming champion – Bob Bob Momo Banana (Mio Momono and Yurika Oka)
Date	Winner	Event/Show	Note(s)
February 9	Red Energy (Mika Iwata and Miyuki Takase)	Sendai Girls	
July 19	Team 200kg (Chihiro Hashimoto and Yuu)	Senjo The New Era	
December 26 (aired December 29)	Bob Bob Momo Banana (Mio Momono and Yurika Oka)	Sendai Girls	

=== Spark Joshi ===
Spark Joshi World Championship
Incoming champion – Vacant
Date	Winner	Event/Show	Note(s)
April 17	Hazuki	Lady Luck	Defeated Lena Kross to win the vacant championship.

Spark Joshi Pacific Championship
Incoming champion – Ram Kaicho
Date	Winner	Event/Show	Note(s)
April 17	VertVixen	Lady Luck	
June 29	Airica Demia	Ignite Texas	This was a three-way match also involving Miyu Yamashita.

Spark Joshi Atlantic Championship
Incoming champion – Saki
No title changes.

=== Stardom ===
World of Stardom Championship
Incoming champion – Saya Kamitani
No title changes.

Wonder of Stardom Championship
Incoming champion – Starlight Kid
Date	Winner	Event/Show	Note(s)
November 3	Konami	Crimson Nightmare	

Goddesses of Stardom Championship
Incoming champions – wing★gori (Hanan and Saya Iida)
Date	Winner	Event/Show	Note(s)
July 24	BMI2000 (Natsuko Tora and Ruaka)	Stardom Nighter in Korakuen	

Artist of Stardom Championship
Incoming champions – Cosmic Angels (Tam Nakano, Saori Anou and Natsupoi)
Date	Winner	Event/Show	Note(s)
February 2	Neo Genesis (Starlight Kid, AZM, and Miyu Amasaki)	Supreme Fight	
September 10	H.A.T.E. (Konami, Rina, and Fukigen Death)	Stardom Nighter in Korakuen	

High Speed Championship
Incoming champion – Mei Seira
Date	Winner	Event/Show	Note(s)
December 24	Yuna Mizumori	Year-End X'Mas Night	

Future of Stardom Championship
Incoming champion – Miyu Amasaki
Date	Winner	Event/Show	Note(s)
February 24	Hina	Path of Thunder	

New Blood Tag Team Championship
Incoming champions – Rice or Bread (Waka Tsukiyama and Hanako)
Date	Winner	Event/Show	Note(s)
October 30	Sakurara (Aya Sakura and Sayaka Kurara)	New Blood 26	

IWGP Women's Championship
Incoming champion – Mayu Iwatani
Co-promoted with New Japan Pro-Wrestling
Date	Winner	Event/Show	Note(s)
April 27	Syuri	All Star Grand Queendom	
June 21	Sareee	The Conversion	
October 13	Syuri	NJPW King of Pro-Wrestling	

Strong Women's Championship
Incoming champion – Mercedes Moné
Co-promoted with New Japan Pro-Wrestling
Date	Winner	Event/Show	Note(s)
May 9	AZM	NJPW Resurgence	This was a three-way match also involving Mina Shirakawa.
September 27	Saya Kamitani	Stardom	This was a Winner Takes All match also for Kamitani's World of Stardom Championship.

=== Tenryu Project ===
Tenryu Project International Junior Heavyweight Championship
Incoming champion – Yusuke Kodama
Date	Winner	Event/Show	Note(s)
May 21	Koji Iwamoto	Live for Today Vol. 2	

Tenryu Project International Junior Heavyweight Tag Team Championship
Incoming champions – Yuya Susumu and Kengo
Date	Winner	Event/Show	Note(s)
December 20	Takuro Niki and Yusuke Kodama	Live for Today Vol. 8	

Tenryu Project WAR World 6-Man Tag Team Championship
Incoming champions – Koji Iwamoto, Kouki Iwasaki, and Shigehiro Irie
Date	Winner	Event/Show	Note(s)
February 20	Daichi Hashimoto, Hikaru Sato and Sushi	Light My Fire Vol. 10	
July 20	Kengo, Masayuki Kono, and Yuya Susumu	Live for Today Vol. 4	
August 16	Don Fujii, Kenichiro Arai, and "brother"Yasshi	Osaka Crush Night	
October 25	Kengo, Masayuki Kono, and Yuya Susumu	Osaka Crush Night	

United National Tag Team Championship
Incoming champions – Kohei Sato and Masayuki Kono
Date	Winner	Event/Show	Note(s)
December 25	Koji Iwamoto and Hideyoshi Kamitani	Tenryu Genichiro Triple Year Crowdfunding Event	

=== TNA ===
TNA World Championship
Incoming champion – Nic Nemeth
Date	Winner	Event/Show	Note(s)
January 19	Joe Hendry	Genesis	
May 25	Trick Williams	NXT Battleground	This was the first time a TNA championship changed hands at a WWE event.
October 12	Mike Santana	Bound for Glory	
November 13	Frankie Kazarian	TNA Impact! Live	This was Kazarian's Call Your Shot championship match.

TNA X Division Championship
Incoming champion – Moose
Date	Winner	Event/Show	Note(s)
July 20	Leon Slater	Slammiversary	

TNA Knockouts World Championship
Incoming champion – Masha Slamovich
Date	Winner	Event/Show	Note(s)
July 20	Jacy Jayne	Slammiversary	This was a Title vs. Title match also for Jayne's NXT Women's Championship. Jayne would become the first wrestler to simultaneously hold championships in WWE and TNA.
August 24	Ash by Elegance	NXT Heatwave	This was a WWE event. This was a triple threat match also involving Masha Slamovich.
September 26	Vacated	Victory Road	Ash vacated the title to take time away from in-ring competition
September 26	Kelani Jordan	Victory Road	Defeated Léi Yǐng Lee to win the vacant title.
November 18 (aired November 25)	Léi Yǐng Lee	NXT: Gold Rush; Week 2	This was a WWE show. This was a triple threat match also involving Jordynne Grace.

TNA World Tag Team Championship
Incoming champions – The Hardys (Matt Hardy and Jeff Hardy)
Date	Winner	Event/Show	Note(s)
April 27	The Nemeths (Nic Nemeth and Ryan Nemeth)	Rebellion	
July 20	The Hardys (Matt Hardy and Jeff Hardy)	Slammiversary	This was a four-way ladder match also involving Fir$t Cla$$ (A. J. Francis and KC Navarro) and The Rascalz (Zachary Wentz and Myron Reed).

TNA Knockouts World Tag Team Championship
Incoming champions – Spitfire (Dani Luna and Jody Threat)
Date	Winner	Event/Show	Note(s)
March 14	The Elegance Brand (Ash by Elegance, Heather by Elegance, and M by Elegance)	Sacrifice	This was a 3-on-2 handicap match where Ash, Heather, and their manager, The Personal Concierge, defeated Spitfire. On May 29, Maggie Lee joined the stable as M by Elegance, and they would defend the titles under the Freebird Rule.
September 27 (aired October 2)	The IInspiration (Cassie Lee and Jessie McKay)	TNA Impact!	Defeated Heather and M, who represented The Elegance Brand.

TNA International Championship
(Title introduced)
Date	Winner	Event/Show	Note(s)
April 17	Steve Maclin	Unbreakable	Defeated A. J. Francis and Eric Young in a tournament final to become the inaugural champion.
September 26	Frankie Kazarian	Victory Road	
October 12	Steve Maclin	Bound for Glory	
December 5	Channing "Stacks" Lorenzo	Final Resolution	

TNA Digital Media Championship
Incoming champion – PCO
Date	Winner	Event/Show	Note(s)
January 19	Vacated	The People vs. GCW	This was a Game Changer Wrestling (GCW) event. In storyline, PCO vacated the title after he destroyed the belt with a sledgehammer before cutting a shoot promo on the promotion. In reality, the title was vacated after PCO departed TNA following his contract expiring.
January 23	Steph De Lander	TNA Impact! Live	In storyline, De Lander claimed to have been awarded the title after her divorce from her on-screen husband PCO.
March 29 (aired April 3)	Deactivated	TNA Impact!	TNA Director of Authority Santino Marella stripped Steph De Lander of the title and replaced it with the TNA International Championship.

International Heavyweight Championship
Incoming champion – PCO
Date	Winner	Event/Show	Note(s)
January 19	Deactivated	The People vs. GCW	This was a Game Changer Wrestling (GCW) event. After PCO cut a promo in which he legitimately aired his grievances with TNA management, before attempting to destroy the TNA Digital Media Championship belt with a sledgehammer. The Canadian International Heavyweight Championship was subsequently dropped by TNA.

=== UWN ===
UWN World Championship
Incoming champion – Danny Limelight
Date	Winner	Event/Show	Note(s)
July 1 (aired July 20)	Jordan Cruz	Championship Wrestling	

UWN Heritage Heavyweight Championship
Incoming champion – Vacant
Date	Winner	Event/Show	Note(s)
February 25 (aired April 13)	EJ Sparks	Championship Wrestling	Defeated Brandon Cutler, Evan Daniels, Jordan Oasis, and Stunt Marshall in a five-way match to win the vacant title.
November 18 (aired December 13)	Maximilien	Championship Wrestling	

UWN Television Championship
Incoming champion – Zicky Dice
Date	Winner	Event/Show	Note(s)
April 29 (aired June 1)	Evan Daniels	Championship Wrestling	

UWN Tag Team Championship
Incoming champion – TMZ (Shane Haste, Bad Dude Tito, and Che Cabrera)
Date	Winner	Event/Show	Note(s)
September 23 (aired September 28)	5150 (Danny Limelight and Slice Boogie)	Championship Wrestling	

UWN Women's World Championship
(Title introduced)
Date	Winner	Event/Show	Note(s)
February 25 (aired April 13)	Big Mama	Championship Wrestling	Defeated Alex Gracia in a "Lethal Ladies Lottery" match to become the inaugural champion.

=== Wave Pro ===
Wave Single Championship
Incoming champion – Saya Kamitani
Date	Winner	Event/Show	Note(s)
August 10	Kohaku	Wave 18th Anniversary ~ Carnival WAVE	
November 2	Itsuki Aoki	Prime Wave	

Wave Tag Team Championship
Incoming champion – Captain Armstrong (Yuki Miyazaki and Yuko Sakurai)
Date	Winner	Event/Show	Note(s)
April 1	SPiCEAP (Maika Ozaki and Tae Honma)	PHASE2 Reboot 6th ~ NAMI 1	
October 13	Vacated	–	The titles were vacated after Tae Honma retired from professional wrestling.
November 2	Life Thirty-One (Yumi Ohka and Saran)	Prime Wave	Defeated Azure Revolution (Maya Yukihi and Risa Sera) to win the vacant titles.

=== West Coast Pro ===
West Coast Pro Wrestling Heavyweight Championship
Incoming champion – Titus Alexander
Date	Winner	Event/Show	Note(s)
January 10	Kevin Blackwood	Only the Strong Survive	
November 1	Vinnie Massaro	How The West was Won	This was a Title vs. Career match.

West Coast Pro Wrestling Golden Gate Championship
(Title introduced)
Date	Winner	Event/Show	Note(s)
April 4	Bret the Threat	BTW/West Coast Pro Battle of The Bay	Defeated Jiah Jewell in a tournament final to become the inaugural champion.
July 26	Vacated	Cruel Summer	
July 26	Alpha Zo	Cruel Summer	Co-promoted with Deadlock Pro-Wrestling (DPW) and Prestige Wrestling. This was a Golden Gate Gauntlet match for the vacant title, also involving Adrian Quest, Danny Orion, Jordan Cruz, Manny Lo, and Ryan Clancy. Zo last eliminated Quest to win the vacant title.
November 1	Andrew Cass	How The West was Won	

West Coast Pro Wrestling Women's Championship
Incoming champion – Zara Zakher
Date	Winner	Event/Show	Note(s)
March 22	Johnnie Robbie	West Coast Best Coast	

West Coast Pro Wrestling Tag Team Championship
Incoming champions – The Crush Boys (Titus Alexander and Starboy Charlie)
Date	Winner	Event/Show	Note(s)
April 17	The Cowboy Way (1 Called Manders and Thomas Shire)	Vegas Vacation	
July 26	The Crush Boys (Titus Alexander and Starboy Charlie)	Cruel Summer	Co-promoted with Deadlock Pro-Wrestling (DPW) and Prestige Wrestling.

=== WOS ===
WOS Championship
Incoming champion – Sha Samuels
No title changes.

WOS Women's Championship
Incoming champion – Alex Windsor
No title changes.

WOS Tag Team Championship
Incoming champions – UK Pitbulls (Bulk and Big Dave)
No title changes.

=== WOW ===
WOW World Championship
Incoming champion – Tormenta
Date	Winner	Event/Show	Note(s)
October 14 (aired February 21, 2026)	Penelope Pink	WOW: Season 11 Episode 20	
October 22 (aired August 15, 2026)	Santana Garrett	WOW: Season 11 Episode 37	

WOW World Tag Team Championship
Incoming champions – Miami's Sweet Heat (Laurie Carlson and Lindsey Carlson)
Date	Winner	Event/Show	Note(s)
October 22 (aired May 23, 2026)	Ashley Blaze and Tara Strike	WOW: Season 11 Episode 33	This was a three-way tag team match also involving Best 4 Business (Kara Kai and Sandy Shore).
October 22 (aired August 8, 2026)	Best 4 Business (Kara Kai and Sandy Shore)	WOW: Season 11 Episode 36	

WOW Trios Championship
Incoming champions – Top Tier (Coach Campanelli, Kandi Krush, and Gloria Glitter)
Date	Winner	Event/Show	Note(s)
October 14 (aired March 14, 2026)	Monsters and Metal (Chainsaw, Daisy Lane, and Fury)	WOW: Season 11 Episode 23	This was a Full Metal Massacre match.

=== WWE ===
– Raw
– SmackDown
– NXT
– Evolve
– Unbranded

==== Raw and SmackDown ====
Raw and SmackDown each exclusively have a world and secondary championship for both the men and women, as well as a tag team championship for men.

World Heavyweight Championship
Incoming champion – Gunther
Date	Winner	Event/Show	Note(s)
April 19	Jey Uso	WrestleMania 41; Night 1	
June 9	Gunther	Raw	
August 2	CM Punk	SummerSlam; Night 1	
August 2	Seth Rollins	SummerSlam; Night 1	This was Rollins's Money in the Bank cash-in match.
October 20	Vacated	Raw	Seth Rollins was stripped of the title after suffering a shoulder injury.
November 1	CM Punk	Saturday Night's Main Event XLI	Defeated Jey Uso to win the vacant title.

Undisputed WWE Championship
Incoming champion – Cody Rhodes
Date	Winner	Event/Show	Note(s)
April 20	John Cena	WrestleMania 41; Night 2	
August 3	Cody Rhodes	SummerSlam; Night 2	This was a Street Fight.

Women's World Championship
Incoming champion – Liv Morgan
Date	Winner	Event/Show	Note(s)
January 6	Rhea Ripley	Raw's Netflix Premiere	
March 3	Iyo Sky	Raw	
July 13	Naomi	Evolution	This was Naomi's Money in the Bank cash-in match, which was originally a singles match between Iyo Sky and Rhea Ripley, but converted into a triple threat match after Naomi cashed in her contract mid-match. Naomi pinned Sky to win the match. Naomi was a member of the SmackDown roster prior to the cash-in and was subsequently transferred to Raw upon her win.
August 18	Vacated	Raw	Naomi relinquished the title after announcing her pregnancy.
September 20	Stephanie Vaquer	Wrestlepalooza	Defeated Iyo Sky to win the vacant championship.

WWE Women's Championship
Incoming champion – Nia Jax
Date	Winner	Event/Show	Note(s)
January 3	Tiffany Stratton	SmackDown	This was Stratton's Money in the Bank cash-in match.
November 1	Jade Cargill	Saturday Night's Main Event XLI	

WWE Intercontinental Championship
Incoming champion – Bron Breakker
Date	Winner	Event/Show	Note(s)
April 20	Dominik Mysterio	WrestleMania 41; Night 2	This was a fatal four-way match, also involving Penta and Finn Bálor, who Mysterio pinned.
November 10	John Cena	Raw	
November 29	Dominik Mysterio	Survivor Series: WarGames	

WWE United States Championship
Incoming champion – Shinsuke Nakamura
Date	Winner	Event/Show	Note(s)
March 7	LA Knight	SmackDown	
April 19	Jacob Fatu	WrestleMania 41; Night 1	
June 28	Solo Sikoa	Night of Champions	
August 29	Sami Zayn	SmackDown	
October 17	Ilja Dragunov	SmackDown	This was an open challenge.
December 19 (aired December 26)	Carmelo Hayes	SmackDown	This was an open challenge.

WWE Women's Intercontinental Championship
(Title created)
Date	Winner	Event/Show	Note(s)
January 13	Lyra Valkyria	Raw	Defeated Dakota Kai in a tournament final to become the inaugural champion. The tournament itself began on December 2, 2024.
June 7	Becky Lynch	Money in the Bank	This was a Last Chance match where if Lynch lost, she would have never been able to challenge for the title again for as long as Lyra Valkyria was champion. Since Valkyria lost, she had to raise Lynch's hand and acknowledge her as the better woman.
November 17	Maxxine Dupri	Raw	

WWE Women's United States Championship
Incoming champion – Chelsea Green
Date	Winner	Event/Show	Note(s)
April 25	Zelina Vega	SmackDown	
June 27	Giulia	SmackDown	
November 7	Chelsea Green	SmackDown	

World Tag Team Championship
Incoming champions – The War Raiders (Erik and Ivar)
Date	Winner	Event/Show	Note(s)
April 19	The New Day (Kofi Kingston and Xavier Woods)	WrestleMania 41; Night 1	
June 30	The Judgment Day (Finn Bálor and JD McDonagh)	Raw	
October 20	AJ Styles and Dragon Lee	Raw	
December 29	The Usos (Jey Uso and Jimmy Uso)	Raw	

WWE Tag Team Championship
Incoming champions – #DIY (Johnny Gargano and Tommaso Ciampa)
Date	Winner	Event/Show	Note(s)
March 14	The Street Profits (Angelo Dawkins and Montez Ford)	SmackDown	
July 11	The Wyatt Sicks (Joe Gacy and Dexter Lumis)	SmackDown	

==== NXT ====
NXT exclusively has a primary and secondary championship for both the men and women, as well as a specialty and tag team championship for men.

NXT Championship
Incoming champion – Trick Williams
Date	Winner	Event/Show	Note(s)
January 7	Oba Femi	NXT: New Year's Evil	This was a triple threat match also involving Eddy Thorpe.
September 27	Ricky Saints	No Mercy	
December 6	Oba Femi	Deadline	

NXT Women's Championship
Incoming champion – Roxanne Perez
Date	Winner	Event/Show	Note(s)
January 7	Giulia	NXT: New Year's Evil	
March 11	Stephanie Vaquer	NXT: Roadblock	This was a Winner Takes All match in which Vaquer defended the NXT Women's North American Championship.
May 27	Jacy Jayne	NXT	
October 25	Tatum Paxley	Halloween Havoc	
November 18	Jacy Jayne	NXT: Gold Rush; Night 1	This was a Last Chance match where if Jayne had lost, she would have never been able to challenge for the title again for as long as Tatum Paxley was champion.

NXT North American Championship
Incoming champion – Tony D'Angelo
Date	Winner	Event/Show	Note(s)
March 4	Shawn Spears	NXT	
April 1	Ricky Saints	NXT	
May 27	Ethan Page	NXT	

NXT Women's North American Championship
Incoming champion – Fallon Henley
Date	Winner	Event/Show	Note(s)
February 15	Stephanie Vaquer	Vengeance Day	
April 1	Vacated	NXT	Vaquer relinquished the title due to simultaneously holding the NXT Women's Championship.
April 19	Sol Ruca	Stand & Deliver	Defeated Zaria, Kelani Jordan, Lola Vice, Izzi Dame, and Thea Hail in a six-woman ladder match to win the vacant title.
October 25	Blake Monroe	Halloween Havoc	Defeated Zaria, who defended the title on behalf of an injured Sol Ruca.
December 16	Thea Hail	NXT	This was a legitimate unplanned finish, as Monroe was supposed to retain, but she did not kick out in time and the referee counted the pinfall regardless.

NXT Heritage Cup
Incoming champion – Lexis King
Date	Winner	Event/Show	Note(s)
April 22	Noam Dar	NXT	
June 21	Vacated	—	Noam Dar relinquished the championship due to injury.
June 24	Channing "Stacks" Lorenzo	NXT	Defeated Tony D'Angelo by 2–1 to win the vacant championship.
July 12	Deactivated	The Great American Bash	During the broadcast, Tony D'Angelo stole and threw the Heritage Cup off a bridge. Following this, Channing "Stacks" Lorenzo did not appear with the Cup nor was he referred to as champion on-screen, but the title remained listed as active with him as the reigning champion on WWE's website. On June 3, 2026, the website was updated to retire the title on this date.

NXT Tag Team Championship
Incoming champions – Nathan Frazer and Axiom
Date	Winner	Event/Show	Note(s)
April 19	Hank and Tank	Stand & Deliver	
August 24	DarkState (Dion Lennox and Osiris Griffin)	Heatwave	
October 7	The Hardy Boyz (Jeff Hardy and Matt Hardy)	NXT vs. TNA Showdown	This was a Winners Take All match in which The Hardy Boyz defended the TNA World Tag Team Championship. The Hardy Boyz became the first TNA-contracted wrestlers to hold WWE titles.
October 25	DarkState (Osiris Griffin and Dion Lennox/Saquon Shugars)	Halloween Havoc	This was a Broken Rules match. Originally, Griffin and Lennox won the title; however, on NXT on December 2, Lennox relinquished his half of the title to stablemate Shugars to focus on singles championships.

==== Unbranded ====
These titles are non-exclusive, available to wrestlers from Raw, SmackDown, and NXT.

WWE Women's Tag Team Championship
Incoming champions – Bianca Belair and Naomi
Date	Winner	Event/Show	Note(s)
February 24	Liv Morgan and Raquel Rodriguez	Raw	
April 20	Becky Lynch and Lyra Valkyria	WrestleMania 41; Night 2	
April 21	Liv Morgan and Raquel Rodriguez	Raw	
June 30	Raquel Rodriguez and Roxanne Perez	Raw	Due to a legitimate injury incurred by Liv Morgan, Perez officially replaced her as Rodriguez's championship partner, with WWE recognizing this as a separate reign for Rodriguez.
August 2	Alexa Bliss and Charlotte Flair	SummerSlam; Night 1	
November 10	The Kabuki Warriors (Asuka and Kairi Sane)	Raw	

WWE Speed Championship
Incoming champion – Dragon Lee
Date	Winner	Event/Show	Note(s)
May 5 (aired May 7)	El Grande Americano	Speed	
The title became exclusive to the NXT brand following an announcement made by NXT general manager Ava at Heatwave on August 24 after Speed went on an indefinite hiatus.
November 11	Jasper Troy	NXT	

WWE Women's Speed Championship
Incoming champion – Candice LeRae
Date	Winner	Event/Show	Note(s)
April 11 (aired April 16)	Sol Ruca	Speed	
The title became exclusive to the NXT brand following an announcement made by NXT general manager Ava at Heatwave on August 24 after Speed went on an indefinite hiatus.
October 28	Vacated	NXT	Sol Ruca relinquished the title due to injury.
November 18 (aired November 25)	Fallon Henley	NXT: Gold Rush; Night 2	Defeated Zaria in a tournament final to win the vacant title, which went into sudden death over time.

==== WWE Evolve ====
Evolve, a relaunch of the former promotion, is WWE's newer developmental brand focused on trainees from the WWE Performance Center.

WWE Evolve Championship
(Title created)
Date	Winner	Event/Show	Note(s)
April 25 (aired June 4)	Jackson Drake	Evolve	Defeated Keanu Carver, Edris Enofe, and Sean Legacy, who Drake last eliminated, in a fatal four-way elimination match to become the inaugural champion.

WWE Evolve Women's Championship
(Title created)
Date	Winner	Event/Show	Note(s)
April 25 (aired May 28)	Kali Armstrong	Evolve	Defeated Wendy Choo, Kendal Grey, and Kylie Rae, who Armstrong last eliminated, in a fatal four-way elimination match to become the inaugural champion.
September 23 (aired October 15)	Kendal Grey	Evolve: Succession	

==== WWE ID ====
The WWE Independent Development (ID) program has two championships, one each for men and women, which are defended exclusively across partner independent promotions. Additionally, if a non-WWE ID wrestler were to win either title, they also earn a WWE ID contract.

WWE ID Championship
(Title created)
Date	Winner	Event/Show	Note(s)
August 1	Cappuccino Jones	The ID Showcase	This was a Game Changer Wrestling event. Defeated Jack Cartwheel in a tournament final to become the inaugural champion.

WWE Women's ID Championship
(Title created)
Date	Winner	Event/Show	Note(s)
August 1	Kylie Rae	The ID Showcase	This was a Game Changer Wrestling event. Defeated Zara Zakher and Zayda Steel in a tournament final triple threat match to become the inaugural champion.
September 22	Vacated	N/A	The title was vacated due to Kylie Rae going on maternity leave.
November 17	Laynie Luck	Wrestling Open RI 33	This was a Beyond Wrestling event. Defeated Airica Demia, Brittnie Brooks, Notorious Mimi, Tiara James, and Shannon LeVangie in a six-woman elimination match to win the vacant title. As a result of the win, Luck also earned a WWE ID contract.

=== wXw ===
wXw Unified World Wrestling Championship
Incoming champion – Peter Tihanyi
Date	Winner	Event/Show	Note(s)
February 13	Vacated	–	Vacated due to Tihanyi sustaining a shoulder injury.
April 5	1 Called Manders	We Love Wrestling: 16 Gold Carat Revenge	Defeated Elijah Blum to win the vacant title.
September 27	Peter Tihanyi	Pro-Wrestling Grand Prix; Night 3	

wXw Shotgun Championship
Incoming champion – Anita Vaughan
Date	Winner	Event/Show	Note(s)
March 8	Joseph Fenech Jr.	Shotgun Bonanza	This was a seven-man battle royal. Fenech last eliminated Vaughan to win the title.
April 5	Hektor Invictus	We Love Wrestling: 16 Carat Gold Revenge	
September 28	Dennis Dullnig	We Love Wrestling #71	

wXw European Championship
Incoming champion – Mike D Vecchio
Date	Winner	Event/Show	Note(s)
May 20	Vacated	–	Vacated due to Vecchio sustaining a knee injury.
May 23	Marius Al-Ani	Fans Appreciation Night	Defeated Metehan to win the vacant title.
October 2	Vacated	–	Vacated after wXw severed ties with Al-Ani following a controversial online post.
December 13	Ricky Sosa	25th Anniversary	Defeated Joseph Fenech Jr. and Zoltan in a three-way match to win the vacant title.

wXw World Tag Team Championship
Incoming champions – Young Blood (Oskar Leube and Yuto Nakashima)
Date	Winner	Event/Show	Note(s)
March 7	Big Bucks (Alex Duke and Norman Harras)	16 Carat Gold Tournament; Night 2	This was a four-way tables, ladders, and chairs match also involving High Performer Ltd. (Anil Marik and Icarus) and Planet Gojirah (Robert Dreissker and Marc Empire).
June 14	Planet Gojirah (Robert Dreissker and Marc Empire)	Drive of Champions	
November 16	Greedy Souls (Brendan White and Danny Jones)	wXw 25th Anniversary Tour: Leipzig	
November 21	Planet Gojirah (Robert Dreissker and Marc Empire)	wXw 25th Anniversary Tour: Hamburg; Night 1	This was a three-way tag team match also involving The Grind (Laurance Roman and Nick Schreier).
December 13	The Grind (Laurance Roman and Nick Schreier)	wXw 25th Anniversary	

wXw Academy Championship
Incoming champion – M4
Date	Winner	Event/Show	Note(s)
May 21	Dieter Schwartz	Wrestling im Hagenbusch	Four-way match also involving Steven Crown and Yuval Goldshmit.
August 22	Zoltan	TAW Dojo Show	This was a That's Awesome Wrestling (TAW) event.
November 5	The Breezy Bruiser	Heat in Der wXw Wrestling Academy	

=== Zero1 ===
World Heavyweight Championship
Incoming champion – Go Shiozaki
Date	Winner	Event/Show	Note(s)
October 15	Vacated	–	Vacated after Shiozaki's departure from Pro Wrestling Noah.
November 10	Masato Tanaka	Reborn Zero1 First Advance to The Holy Land	Defeated Atsushi Kotoge to win the vacant title.

World Junior Heavyweight Championship
Incoming champion – Seiki Yoshioka
Date	Winner	Event/Show	Note(s)
January 1 (aired January 12)	Takumi Baba	Tochi Pro Happy New Year & Shinjiro Otani Aid ~ Stand Up Again and Again	Baba's International Junior Heavyweight Championship was also on the line.

International Junior Heavyweight Championship
Incoming champion – Seiki Yoshioka
Date	Winner	Event/Show	Note(s)
January 1 (aired January 12)	Takumi Baba	Tochi Pro Happy New Year & Shinjiro Otani Aid ~ Stand Up Again and Again	Baba's World Junior Heavyweight Championship was also on the line.

Intercontinental Tag Team Championship
Incoming champions – M2J (Kengo Mashimo and Naka Shuma)
Date	Winner	Event/Show	Note(s)
September 27	Kubota Brothers (Hide Kubota and Yasu Kubota)	Zero1	
October 18	Vacated	–	The titles were vacated after Hide Kubota suffered an injury.
December 27	Junya Matsunaga and Tsugutaka Sato	Furinkazan Tag Tournament; Night 4	Defeated Jinsei Shinzaki and Haybusa in the final of the Furinkazan Tag Tournament to win the vacant titles.

Bright Future Openweight Championship
(Title introduced)
Date	Winner	Event/Show	Note(s)
April 5	Satsuki Nagao	Tochi Pro	Defeated Tsugutaka Sato in a tournament final to become the inaugural champion.
On December 27, at a press conference, Zero1 announced that affiliate Tochigi Pro-Wrestling would operate independently of Zero1.

== Awards and honors ==
=== AAA Hall of Fame ===
Inductee	Inducted by
Konnan	Rey Mysterio

=== Cauliflower Alley Club ===
Award	Recipient(s)
Iron Mike Mazurki Award	Mick Foley
The Mick Foley Philanthropy Award	Mick Foley
Lou Thesz/Art Abrams Lifetime Achievement Award	Natalya
Men's Wrestling Award	Bob Orton Jr.
Women's Wrestling Award	Jazz
Tag Team Award	The Bushwhackers (Bushwhacker Luke and Bushwhacker Butch)
Lucha Libre Award	El Phantasma
Independent Wrestling Award	Steve Rivers
International Award	Abdullah the Butcher
Posthumous Award	Harley Race
Karl Lauer Independent Promoter Award	Herb Simmons
James C. Melby Historian Award	Pat Laprade and Bertrand Hébert
Ron Hutchison Trainer Award	Tom Prichard
Courage Award	Chris Bey and Joel Goodhart
Red Bastien Friendship Award	Wayne Palmer

=== CZW ===
==== CZW Hall of Fame ====
Inductees
Justice Pain
James Figueiredo

=== ECWA ===
==== ECWA Hall of Fame ====
Inductee
"The Closer" Joey Martinez

=== ESPN ===
==== ESPN Pro Wrestling Awards ====
Award	Recipient(s)
Men's Wrestler of the Year	Dominik Mysterio
Women's Wrestler of the Year	Stephanie Vaquer
Tag Team of the Year	FTR (Dax Harwood and Cash Wheeler)
Debut Wrestler of the Year	Stephanie Vaquer
Breakout Wrestler of the Year	Kyle Fletcher
Rivalry of the Year	"Timeless" Toni Storm vs. Mariah May
Best Promo Artist	Paul Heyman
Match of the Year	John Cena vs. AJ Styles at Crown Jewel
Best PPV/PLE Event of the Year	Revolution

=== Fightful ===
==== Fightful Awards ====
Award	Recipient(s)
Men’s Overall Performer of the Year	"Hangman" Adam Page
Women’s Overall Performer of the Year	"Timeless" Toni Storm
Men’s In-Ring Wrestler of the Year	Bandido
Women’s In-Ring Wrestler of the Year	Iyo Sky
Men's Tag Team of the Year	Brodido (Bandido and Brody King)
Women's Tag Team of the Year	The Judgment Day (Raquel Rodriguez and Roxanne Perez)
Trio/Stable of the Year	The Don Callis Family
Indie Act of the Year	Maya World
Rookie of the Year	Kali Armstrong
Funniest Wrestler of the Year	Harley Cameron
Big Boss Man Memorial "Hater" of the Year	Ricochet
Manager of the Year	Don Callis
Announcer of the Year	Ian Riccaboni
Men's Best of Promos	"Hangman" Adam Page
Women’s Best of Promos	"Timeless" Toni Storm
Best Individual Promo	"Timeless" Toni Storm: "What makes you think I've forgotten?" on Dynamite (January 25)
Finisher of the Year	Sol Snatcher (Sol Ruca)
Gear of the Year	Charlotte Flair at Survivor Series: WarGames
Best Talent Media of the Year	SpeedVlog ("Speedball" Mike Bailey)
Booker of the Year	Tony Khan
Moment of the Year	"Hangman" Adam Page wins the AEW World Championship at All In: Texas
Storyline/Feud of the Year	Jon Moxley vs. "Hangman" Adam Page
Men's Match of the Year	"Hangman" Adam Page vs. Will Ospreay in the Owen Hart Cup Finals at Double or Nothing
Women's Match of the Year	"Timeless" Toni Storm (c) vs. Mariah May in the "Hollywood Ending" for the AEW Women's World Championship at Revolution
Tag Team Match of the Year	Swerve Strickland and Will Ospreay vs. The Young Bucks (Matthew Jackson and Nicholas Jackson) at All In: Texas
Event of the Year	All In: Texas
Promotion of the Year	All Elite Wrestling
Wrestling News Story of the Year	John Cena's "The Last Time is Now" Retirement Tour

=== GCW ===
==== Indie Wrestling Hall of Fame ====
Category	Inductee
Individual	Amazing Red

==== Deathmatch Hall of Fame ====
Category	Inductee	Inducted by
Individual	2 Tuff Tony	Violent J
Individual	Jeff Cannonball	Tony Deppen
Individual	"Scrawny" Shawny Kernaghan	John Zandig
Group	Mean and Hard (Mean Mitch Page and Rollin' Hard)	Nick Maniwa

=== George Tragos/Lou Thesz Professional Wrestling Hall of Fame ===
Category	Inductee
Inductees	Jake Hager
Frank Gotch Award	Ron Simmons
James C. Melby Award	Tim Hornbaker
Lou Thesz Award	Madusa
George Tragos Award	Tank Abbot
Gordon Solie Award	David Crockett
Jack Brisco Spotlight Award	Eric Bischoff
Verne Gagne Trainer Award	Ron Hutchison
Impact Award	Baron von Raschke

=== Hardcore Hall of Fame ===
Category	Inductee	Inducted by
Group	Tri-State Wrestling Alliance (Tony Stetson, D. C. Drake, Joel Goodhart, Johnny Hotbody, and Larry Winters)	Chubby Dudley
Individual	Nick Gage	Matt Tremont
Individual	Missy Sampson	Heidi Lee Morgan
Individual	Taz	Tony Khan

=== International Professional Wrestling Hall of Fame ===
Category	Inductees
Individual	Trish Stratus
Individual	Tito Santana
Individual	Johnny Rodz
Group	The Soul Patrol (Rocky Johnson and Tony Atlas)

=== Marigold ===
==== Dream★Star GP Awards ====
Award	Recipient(s)
Dream League Best Match Award	Mayu Iwatani vs. Victoria Yuzuki on September 14
Star League Best Match Award	Mai Sakurai vs. Mirai on August 30
Fighting Spirit Award	Chika Goto
Outstanding Performance Award	Kouki Amarei
Skill Award	Misa Matsui

==== Marigold Year-End Awards ====
Award	Recipient(s)
MVP Award	Miku Aono
Best Tag Team Award	Darkness Revolution (Misa Matsui and Chiaki)
Fighting Spirit Award	Utami Hayashishita
Outstanding Performance Award	Victoria Yuzuki
SHINE Award	Seri Yamaoka
Technique Award	Mai Sakurai
Best Match Award	Mayu Iwatani vs. Iyo Sky at Grand Destiny

=== MLW ===
==== MLW Founding Father Award ====
Recipient
Satoshi Kojima

=== NWA ===
==== NWA Year End Awards ====
Award	Recipient(s)
Male Wrestler of the Year	Silas Mason
Female Wrestler of the Year	Natalia Markova
Tag Team of the Year	Knox and Murdoch
Breakthrough Star of the Year	Mike Mondo
Top Prospect of Next Year	Kylie Paige
Match of the Year	Natalia Markova vs. Tiffany Nieves in a Steel Cage match
Moment of the Year	Natalia Markova's missile dropkick from the steel cage

=== NJPW ===
==== NJPW Concurso (Best Body) ====
Winner
Hyo

=== Pro Wrestling Illustrated ===
==== Yearly Rankings ====
List	Ranked No. 1
PWI 500	Cody Rhodes
PWI Women's 250	Mercedes Moné
PWI Tag Team 100	The Hardys (Matt Hardy and Jeff Hardy)

==== Pro Wrestling Illustrated awards ====
Category	Winner
Wrestler of the Year	Cody Rhodes
Woman of the Year	Mercedes Moné
Tag Team of the Year	The Hardys (Matt Hardy and Jeff Hardy)
Faction of the Year	The Don Callis Family
Match of the Year	John Cena (c) vs. Cody Rhodes in a street fight for the Undisputed WWE Championship on Night 2 of SummerSlam
Feud of the Year	CM Punk vs. Seth Rollins
Most Popular Wrestler of the Year	Toni Storm
Most Hated Wrestler of the Year	Logan Paul
Comeback of the Year	John Cena
Most Improved Wrestler of the Year	Harley Cameron
Indie Wrestler of the Year	Shotzi Blackheart
Inspirational Wrestler of the Year	Mike Santana
Rookie of the Year	Kendal Grey
Stanley Weston Award (Lifetime Achievement)	Shawn Michaels

=== RevPro ===
==== RevPro Hall of Fame ====
Inductees
Jushin Thunder Liger
James Castle
Kurtis "Mad Kurt" Chapman

=== Sports Illustrated ===
==== Sports Illustrated Pro Wrestling Awards ====
Award	Winner
Men's Wrestler of the Year	"Hangman" Adam Page
Women's Wrestler of the Year	Mercedes Moné
Tag Team of the Year	FTR (Dax Harwood and Cash Wheeler)
Breakout Star of the Year	Kyle Fletcher
Comeback Performer of the Year	Ilja Dragunov
Rivalry of the Year	Jon Moxley vs. "Hangman" Adam Page
Best in the Ring	Will Ospreay
Best on the Mic	"Timeless" Toni Storm
Storyline of the Year	"Hangman" Adam Page's Redemption Arc
Heel Turn of the Year	Naomi revealed as Jade Cargill's attacker
Match of the Year	Iyo Sky (c) vs. Rhea Ripley vs. Bianca Belair for the Women's World Championship at WrestleMania 41 (Night 2)
Show of the Year	Double or Nothing
Promotion of the Year	All Elite Wrestling
Legacy Award	John Cena

=== St. Louis Wrestling Hall of Fame ===
Inductees
Ox Baker
Jerry Blackwell
Ivan Koloff
Butch Reed
Dory Funk Sr.
Greg Valentine

=== Stardom ===
==== 5★Star GP Awards ====
Award	Winner
Best Match Award	Rina vs. AZM on August 6
Blue Stars Best Match Award	Blue Stars A: Saori Anou vs. Bozilla on August 15
Blue Stars Best Match Award	Blue Stars B: Sareee vs. Konami on July 27
Red Stars Best Match Award	Red Stars A: Saya Kamitani vs. Mei Seira on August 16
Red Stars Best Match Award	Red Stars B: Natsuko Tora vs. Rina on August 2
Fighting Spirit Award	Rina
Outstanding Performance Award	Suzu Suzuki
Technique/Skill Award	Rina

==== Stardom Year-End Awards ====
Award	Winner
Best Match Award	Saya Kamitani (c) vs. Tam Nakano in a Career vs. Career match for the World of Stardom Championship at All Star Grand Queendom
Best Tag Team Award	BMI2000 (Natsuko Tora and Ruaka)
Best Technique Award	Syuri
Best Unit Award	H.A.T.E.
Fighting Spirit Award	Starlight Kid
MVP Award	Saya Kamitani
Outstanding Performance Award	Saya Iida
Shining Award	Saya Kamitani
Special Merit Award	Tam Nakano
Topic Award	Fuwa-chan

=== TNA ===
==== TNA Hall of Fame ====
Category	Inductee	Inducted by
Individual	Mickie James	Tara
Group	The Beautiful People (Angelina Love and Velvet Sky)	Tommy Dreamer

==== TNA Year End Awards ====
Award	Winner
Male Wrestler of the Year	Mike Santana
Knockout of the Year	Ash by Elegance
Tag Team of the Year	The Hardys (Matt Hardy and Jeff Hardy)
Knockouts Tag Team of the Year	The Elegance Brand (Ash by Elegance, Heather by Elegance, M by Elegance, and The Personal Concierge)
Faction of the Year	The System
X Division Star of the Year	Leon Slater
Inspirational Wrestler of the Year	Chris Bey
Moment of the Year	AJ Styles Appears at Slammiversary
Crossover Moment of the Year	Joe Hendry vs. Randy Orton at WrestleMania 41 (Night 2)
Match of the Year	Mike Santana vs. Mustafa Ali in a Falls Count Anywhere match at Rebellion

=== Tokyo Sports ===
==== Tokyo Sports Puroresu Awards ====
Award	Winner
MVP Award	Saya Kamitani
Best Bout Award	Kaito Kiyomiya (c) vs. Ozawa for the GHC Heavyweight Championship at The New Year (January 1)
Outstanding Performance Award	Konosuke Takeshita
Fighting Spirit Award	Sareee
Technique Award	Hiroshi Tanahashi
Best Tag Team Award	Knock Out Brothers (Oskar and Yuto-Ice)
Newcomer Award	Kaisei Takechi
Women's Wrestling Grand Prize	Saya Kamitani
Topic Award	Teppei Arita

=== Wave Pro ===
==== Catch the Wave Awards ====
Award	Winner
Best Bout Award	Mio Shirai vs. Risa Sera on May 14
Best Bout Award	Haruka Umesaki vs. Kaho Kobayashi on July 5
Fighting Spirit Award	Mio Shirai
Outstanding Performance Award	Mizuki Kato
Special Award	Cherry
Special Award	Risa Sera
Special Award	Sumire Natsu
Technique Award	Hazuki

=== Women's Wrestling Hall of Fame ===
Category	Inductee
Pro Wrestler	Angelina Love
Pro Wrestler	Chyna
Pro Wrestler	Darling Dagmer
Pro Wrestler	La Dama Enmascarada
Pro Wrestler	Debra Marshall
Pro Wrestler	Desiree Petersen
Pro Wrestler	Hollywood
Pro Wrestler	Kathleen Wimbley
Pro Wrestler	Mercedes Martinez
Pro Wrestler	Misty Blue Simmes
Pro Wrestler	Ramona Isabella
Pro Wrestler	Sandy Parker
Pro Wrestler	Saraya Knight
Pro Wrestler	Wendi Richter
Valets/Referees/Managers/Promoters	Dark Journey
Valets/Referees/Managers/Promoters	Dawn Marie Psaltis
Valets/Referees/Managers/Promoters	Kristina Laum
Amateur	Agnieszka Wieszczek
Amateur	Kaori Icho
Amateur	Risako Kinjo
Group	Jumping Bomb Angels (Itsuki Yamazaki and Noriyo Tateno)
Group	The Wingo Sisters (Babs Wingo, Ethel Johnson, and Marva Scott)

==== WWHOF Awards ====
Award	Recipient(s)
Pro Wrestler of the Year	Rhea Ripley
Pro Wrestler of the Year	Thunder Rosa
Tag Team of the Year	Miami's Sweet Heat (Laurie Carlson and Lindsey Carlson)
Tag Team of the Year	The Hex (Allysin Kay and Marti Belle)
Most Improved Wrestler of the Year	Tessa Blanchard
Rookie of the Year	Tyra Mae Steele
Best New Talent	Margaret Cresta
Rita Marie Referee of the Year	Aubrey Edwards
Announcer of the Year	Samantha Irvin
Promoter of the Year	Missy Sampson
Broadcaster of the Year	Samira
Courage Award	Sis Sisaki
Historian Award	Ash Avildsen
Podcast of the Year	GAW TV
Podcast of the Year	Women's Wrestling Talk
Amateur Wrestler of the Year	Akari Fujinami
Coach of the Year	Randi Miller
Arm Wrestler of the Year	Sarah Bäckman
Susan Tex Green Award	Natalya
Jamie Hennings Award	TK Trinidad

=== Wrestling Observer Newsletter ===
==== Wrestling Observer Newsletter Hall of Fame ====
Inductee
Spiros Arion
Gran Hamada
Dory Dixon
CM Punk
Cody Rhodes
Sabu
Bobby Bruns
Raoul Paoli

==== Wrestling Observer Newsletter awards ====
Category	Winner
Lou Thesz/Ric Flair Award (Wrestler of the Year)	Místico
Most Outstanding Wrestler	Will Ospreay
Tag Team of the Year	The Young Bucks (Matt Jackson and Nick Jackson)
Best on Interviews	"Hangman" Adam Page
Promotion of the Year	Consejo Mundial de Lucha Libre
Best Weekly TV Show	AEW Dynamite
Match of the Year	Kenny Omega vs. Gabe Kidd at Wrestle Dynasty
United States/Canada MVP	Jon Moxley
Koichi Yoshizawa Award (Japan MVP)	Saya Kamitani
Mexico MVP	Místico
Europe MVP	Michael Oku
Danny Hodge Memorial Award (Non-Heavyweight MVP)	Místico
Women's Wrestler MVP	Saya Kamitani
Best Box Office Draw	John Cena
Feud of the Year	Jon Moxley vs. "Hangman" Adam Page
Most Improved	Harley Cameron
Most Charismatic	John Cena
Bryan Danielson Award (Best Technical Wrestler)	Zack Sabre Jr.
Bruiser Brody Award (Best Brawler)	Jon Moxley
Best Flying Wrestler	Máscara Dorada
Most Overrated	Jey Uso
Most Underrated	The Beast Mortos
Rookie of the Year	Seri Yamaoka
Best Non-Wrestler	Don Callis
Best Teleivision Announcer	Bryan Danielson
Worst Television Announcer	Booker T
Best Major Wrestling Show	All In: Texas
Worst Major Wrestling Show	Wrestlepalooza
Best Wrestling Maneuver	Buckshot Lariat ("Hangman" Adam Page)
Most Disgusting Promotional Tactic	WWE bringing Brock Lesnar back whilst being implicated in an active sex trafficking lawsuit
Worst Television Show	NXT
Worst Match of the Year	Cody Rhodes (c) vs. John Cena for the Undisputed WWE Championship on Night 2 of WrestleMania 41
Worst Feud of the Year	Anthony Bowens vs. Max Caster
Worst Promotion of the Year	WWE
Best Booker	Tony Khan
Promoter of the Year	Salvador Lutteroth III
Best Gimmick	"Timeless" Toni Storm
Worst Gimmick	John Cena's heel turn
Best Pro Wrestling Book	The Irresistible Force: The Life and Times of Gorilla Monsoon by Brian Solomon
Best Pro Wrestling DVD/Streaming Documentary	Dark Side of the Ring: Daffney

=== WWE ===
==== WWE Hall of Fame ====
Category	Inductee	Inducted by
Individual	Paul "Triple H" Levesque	Shawn Michaels
Individual	Michelle McCool	The Undertaker
Individual	Lex Luger	Diamond Dallas Page
Group	The Natural Disasters (Earthquake and Typhoon)	N/A
Immortal Moment	Bret "The Hitman" Hart vs. "Stone Cold" Steve Austin in a No Disqualification Submission match with Ken Shamrock as the special guest referee from WrestleMania 13	CM Punk
Legacy	Kamala	N/A
Legacy	Dory Funk Sr.	N/A
Legacy	Ivan Koloff	N/A

==== WWE Slammy Awards ====
Category	Winner
Male Superstar of the Year	Cody Rhodes
Female Superstar of the Year	Liv Morgan
Tag Team of the Year	Bianca Belair and Jade Cargill
Faction of the Year	The OG Bloodline (Roman Reigns, Jey Uso, Jimmy Uso, and Sami Zayn)
NXT Superstar of the Year	Roxanne Perez
Breakout Superstar of the Year	Stephanie Vaquer
Social Star of the Year	Drew McIntyre
Rivalry of the Year	CM Punk vs. Drew McIntyre
Most Memorable Entrance	Cody Rhodes at WrestleMania XL (Night 2)
OMG Moment of the Year	John Cena turning on Cody Rhodes at Elimination Chamber: Toronto
WTF Moment of the Year	The Wyatt Sicks debut
Match of the Year	Roman Reigns (c) vs. Cody Rhodes in a Bloodline Rules match for the Undisputed WWE Championship at WrestleMania XL (Night 2)
Match of the Year	CM Punk vs. Drew McIntyre in a Hell in a Cell match at Bad Blood
Most Aura of the Year	Jey Uso
Villain of the Year	Liv Morgan and Dominik Mysterio
Mic Drop of the Year	Cody Rhodes tells The Rock "Go F*** Yourself" at Elimination Chamber: Toronto

==== NXT Year-End Awards ====
Category	Winner
Male Superstar of the Year	Je'Von Evans
Female Superstar of the Year	Sol Ruca
Tag Team of the Year	ZaRuca (Zaria and Sol Ruca)
Moment of the Year	Tatum Paxley wins the NXT Women's Championship at Halloween Havoc
Match of the Year	Oba Femi (c) vs. Je'Von Evans vs. Trick Williams for the NXT Championship at Stand & Deliver
Best PLE/Show of the Year	Stand & Deliver

== Debuts ==
- January 3 – Seri Yamaoka (Marigold)
- January 6 – Brandon Collins (REVOLVER)
- January 14 – Skylar Raye (WWE), Penina Tuilaepa (WWE), Bayley Humphrey (WWE) and Sirena Linton (WWE)
- January 25 – Akira Kurogane (Stardom)
- January 26 – Yuria Hime (Stardom)
- January 29 – Chika (Evolution)
- February 7 – Haze Jameson (WWE), Masyn Holiday (WWE) and Trill Williams (WWE)
- March 20 – Anne Kanaya (Stardom)
- April 4 – Summer Sorrell (WWE)
- May 21 – Ema Maishima and Kikyo Furusawa (Stardom)
- May 24 – Shinno (Marigold)
- June 1 – Ren Konatsu (TJPW)
- June 14 – Yuka Yamazaki (Marigold), Jax Presley (WWE), Harley Riggins (WWE) and Selene Misora (SEAdLINNNG)
- June 18 – Tetsuya Matsumoto (NJPW)
- July 11 – Jewel Bird (JTO), Lulvica Hinano (JTO) and Saki Kuruya (JTO)
- July 20 – Ayato Horiuchi (Shi-en), Ouga (Shi-en)
- August 2 – Jelly Roll
- August 30 – Hinata Kasai (DDT)
- September 9 – Shady Elnahas (WWE)
- October 5 – Anna (DIANA)
- November 8 – Aaron Fara (WWE)

== Retirements ==
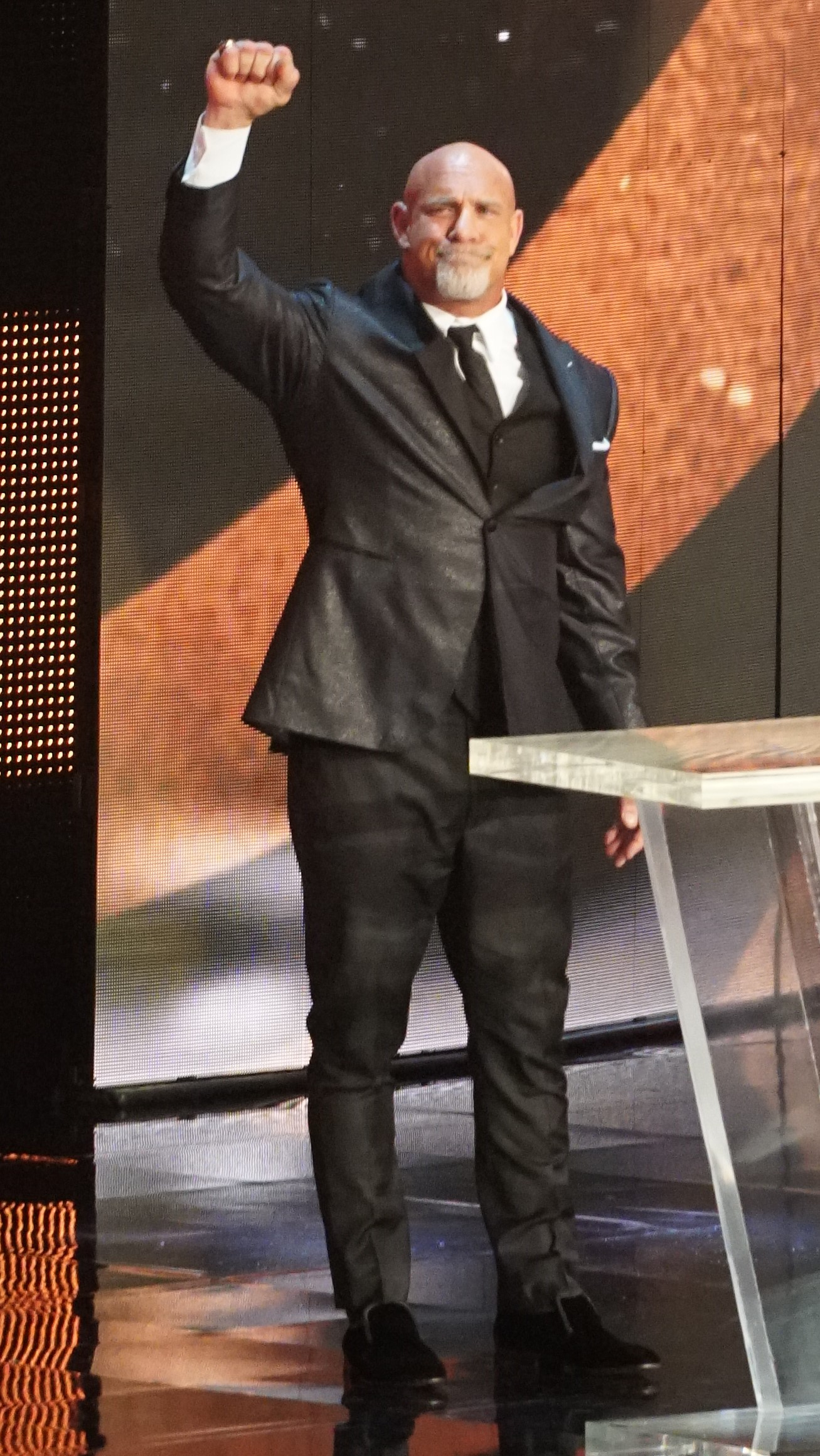
Goldberg

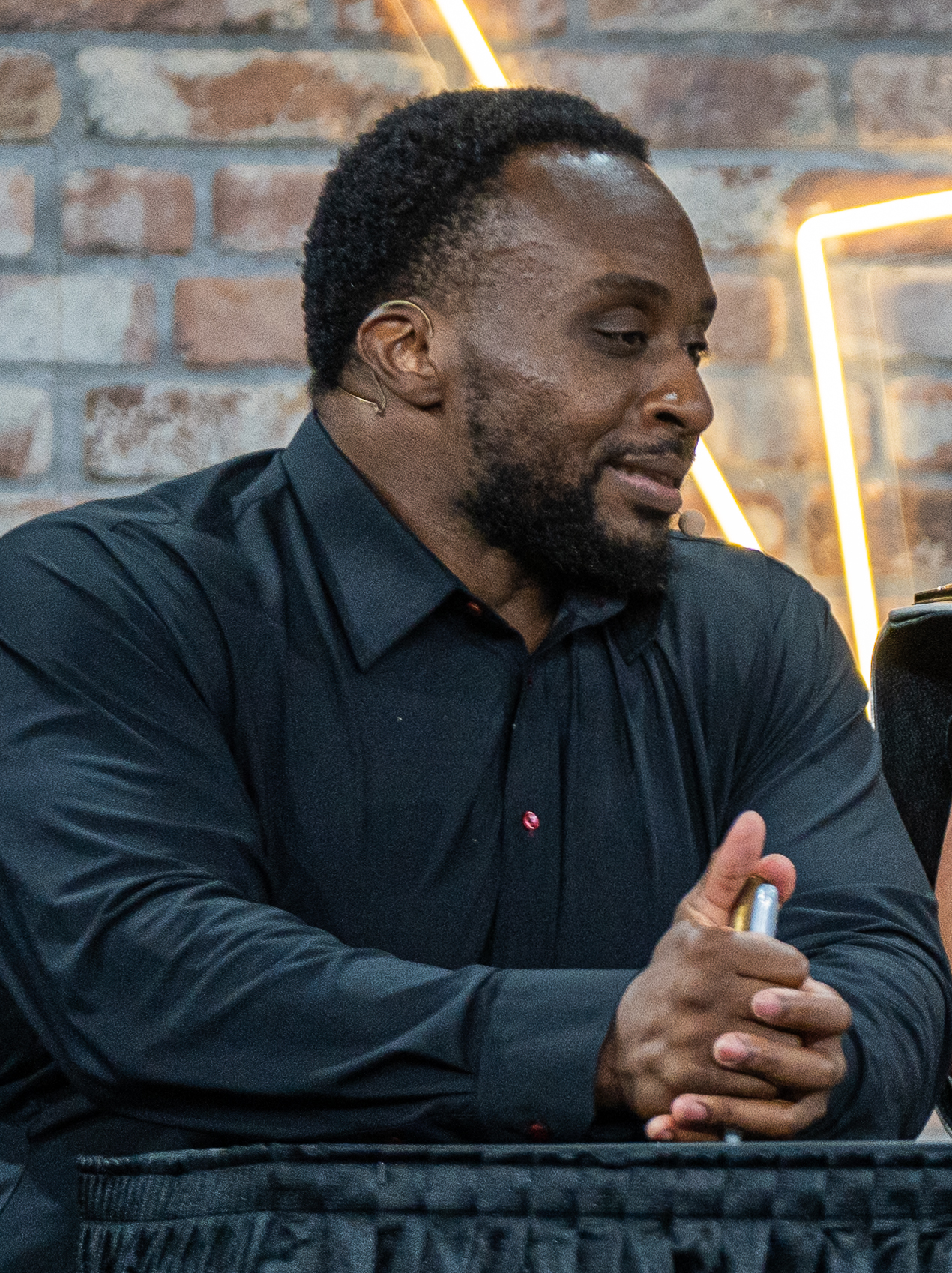
Big E

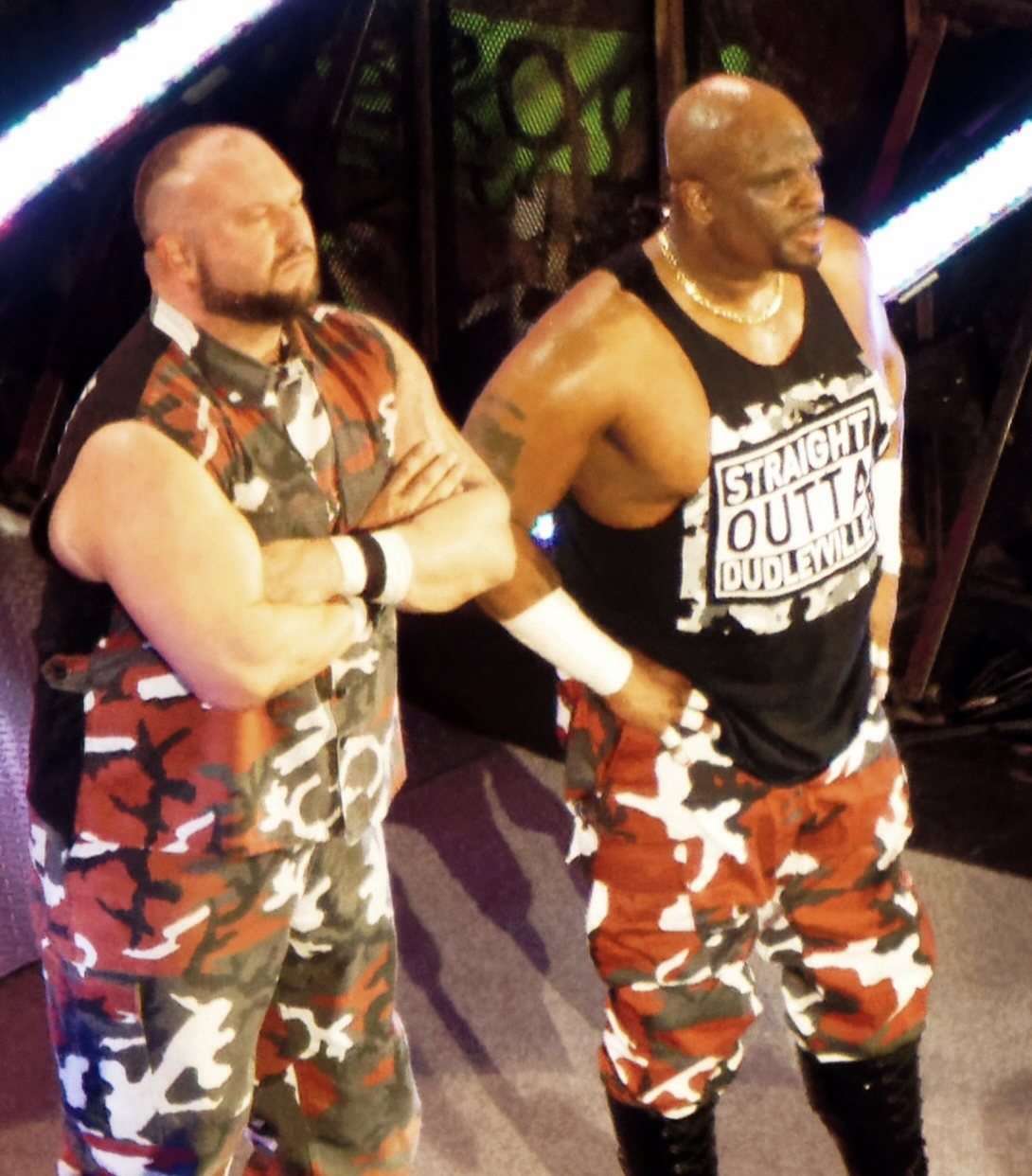
The Dudley Boyz (Bubba Ray Dudley and D-Von Dudley)

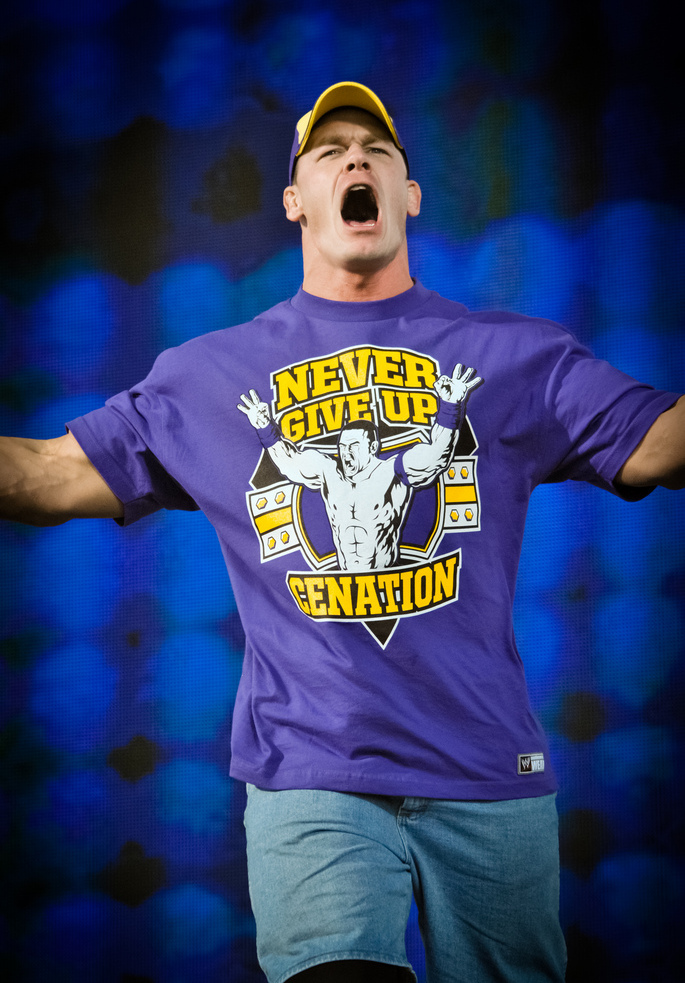
John Cena

- January 8 – Laura Di Matteo
- January 11 – Sumie Sakai
- January 18 – Christopher Daniels
- January 19 – Brandon Kirk
- January 25 – Dean Allmark
- January 31 – Taiyō Kea
- March 8 – Jack Pollock
- March 20 – Homicide
- April 6 – El Hijo del Santo
- April 9 – Kasey Catal
- April 18 – Sabu
- April 26 – Nick Riley
- April 27 – Tam Nakano
- April 29 – Meiko Satomura
- May 3 – Dani Palmer
- May 17 – Sir Samurai
- May 24 – Nanae Takahashi
- May 29 – Miyuna
- June 6 – Brian Milonas
- July 8 – Yoshiko Hasegawa
- July 9 – Issei Onitsuka
- July 12 – Goldberg
- July 25 – Sonya Deville
- August 7 – Jake Hager
- August 15 – Sami Callihan
- September 27 – Haruna Neko
- October 9 – Big E
- October 12 – The Dudley Boyz (Team 3D)
- October 13 – Tae Honma
- October 19 – Wild Boar
- November 23 – Sonoko Kato
- November 29 – Ryo Kawamura
- December 10 – Moka Miyamoto
- December 13 – John Cena
- December 13 – El Hijo del Santo
- December 20 – Cabana Man Dan
- December 28 – Yuu
- December 31 – Dan Barry

== Deaths ==
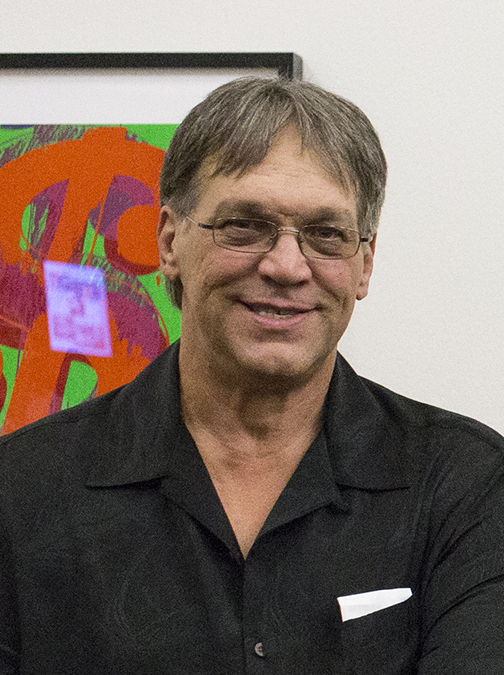
Steve McMichael

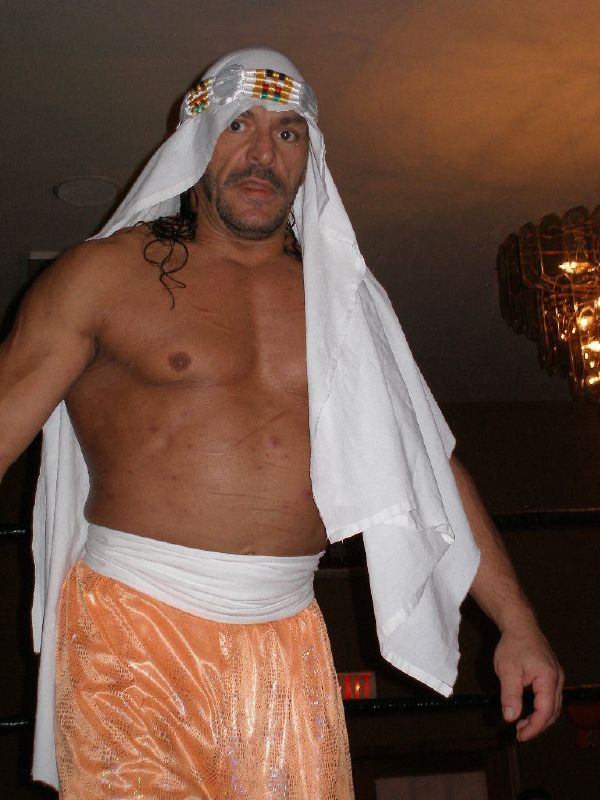
Sabu

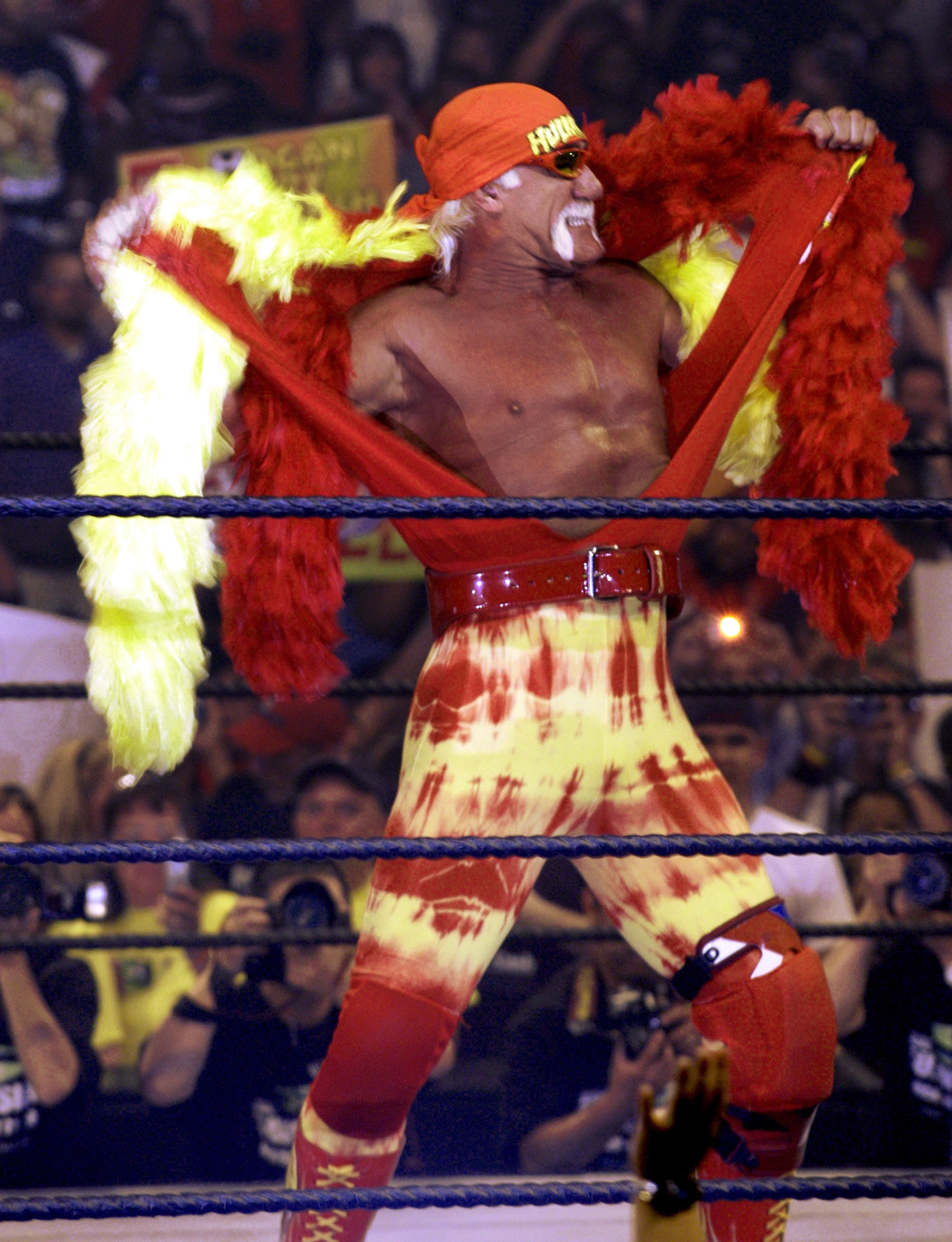
Hulk Hogan

- January 9 – Black Bart (born 1948)
- January 10 – Hunter Q. Robbins III (born 1967/68)
- January 15 – Bob Uecker (born 1934)
- January 23 – Colonel DeBeers (born 1945)
- February 15 – Gran Hamada (born 1950)
- February 27 – Osamu Nishimura (born 1971)
- March 4 – Ciclón Ramirez (born 1961)
- March 6 – Australian Suicide (born 1992)
- March 8 – Rudy Diamond (born 1959)
- March 20 – Rico Suave (born 1970)
- March 25 – Bill Mercer (born 1926)
- April 20 – Black Terry (born 1952)
- April 21 – Hisashi Shinma (born 1935)
- April 23 – Steve McMichael (born 1957)
- April 25 – Takashi Okamura (born 1964)
- May 11 – Sabu (born 1964)
- May 28 – Salman Hashimikov (born 1953)
- June 1 - Rustee Thomas (born 1957)
- July 11 - Knuckles Madsen (born 1984)
- July 24 – Hulk Hogan (born 1953)
- July 28 – Gerry Morrow (born 1949)
- July 30 - Steve Regal (born 1951)
- August 5 – Tomohiko Hashimoto (born 1977)
- August 7 – Robbie Ellis (born 1943)
- August 12 – The Great Wojo (born 1950)
- September 7 – Jaka (born 1986)
- September 8 – Chuck Coates (born 1967)
- October 19 – Mo (born 1967)
- November 6 – Don Robinson (born 1934)
- November 7 – Brian Mackney (born 1948)
- November 15 – Bob Caudle (born 1930)
- December 14 – Solomon Grundy (born 1961)
- December 15 – Joe Carollo (born 1940)
- December 17 – Miss Janeth (born 1973)
- December 19 - Roland Bock (born 1944)

== See also ==
- List of WWE pay-per-view and livestreaming supercards, WWE Raw special episodes, WWE SmackDown special episodes, and WWE NXT special episodes
- List of AEW pay-per-view events, AEW special events, AEW Dynamite special episodes, and AEW Collision special episodes
- List of TNA pay-per-view events and TNA+ Monthly Specials
- List of ROH pay-per-view events and Honor Club exclusive events
- List of NWA pay-per-view events and NWA Special Supercards
- List of MLW events
- List of major NJPW events and NJPW Strong special episodes
- List of major World Wonder Ring Stardom events
- List of major Pro Wrestling Noah events
- List of major DDT Pro-Wrestling events
- List of major Lucha Libre AAA Worldwide events
- List of major Progress Wrestling events
