= WrestleMania 42 =

2026 WWE premium live event

- Promotional poster featuring CM Punk and Roman Reigns
- Promotion: WWE
- Brand(s): Raw; SmackDown
- Date: April 18–19, 2026
- City: Paradise, Nevada
- Venue: Allegiant Stadium
- Attendance: Night 1: 47,093; Night 2: 50,033; Combined: 97,126

WWE event chronology
← Previous; NXT Stand & Deliver	Next → Backlash

WrestleMania chronology
← Previous; 41	Next → 43

WrestleMania 42, also promoted as WrestleMania Vegas, was a 2026 two-part professional wrestling premium live event (PLE) produced by WWE, held for wrestlers from the promotion's main roster brands, Raw and SmackDown. It was the 42nd annual WrestleMania and took place as a two-night event on Saturday, April 18, and Sunday, April 19, 2026, at Allegiant Stadium in Paradise, Nevada for a second consecutive year. John Cena, who retired from in-ring competition in December 2025 and became a WWE brand ambassador, was the host for the event.

WrestleMania 42 was originally scheduled for April 11 and 12 at Caesars Superdome in New Orleans, Louisiana, but was moved to the Las Vegas Valley and delayed by a week due to the financial success of 2025's WrestleMania 41, with Las Vegas paying a higher fee to host the event again; Vegas also used the event as an incentive to boost tourism following a downward trend in 2025. In the United States, the event was the first WrestleMania to livestream on the ESPN app as well as the first to air live on ESPN's linear channels, as the first hour of each night were simulcast on ESPN2 and ESPN, respectively. This would also be the final WrestleMania to stream on Abema in Japan due to its content merging under Netflix in October.

The card comprised a total of 13 matches, with seven on Night 1 and six on Night 2. In the main event of Night 1, Cody Rhodes defeated Randy Orton to retain SmackDown's Undisputed WWE Championship. In other matches, Liv Morgan defeated Stephanie Vaquer to win Raw's Women's World Championship, Gunther defeated Seth Rollins, and in the opening bout, LA Knight and The Usos (Jey Uso and Jimmy Uso) defeated IShowSpeed and The Vision (Logan Paul and Austin Theory) in a six-man tag team match. The first night saw the returns of Paige, who last worked for WWE in 2022 but had not wrestled for the company since December 2017, and Bron Breakker, who had been out with an injury since February. Bianca Belair, who had been out for nearly a year due to an injury, also made an appearance to announce her pregnancy.

In the main event of Night 2, Roman Reigns defeated CM Punk to win Raw's World Heavyweight Championship. In other matches, Rhea Ripley defeated Jade Cargill to win SmackDown's WWE Women's Championship, Penta successfully defended Raw's WWE Intercontinental Championship in a six-man ladder match, and in the opening bout, Oba Femi defeated Brock Lesnar.

This was Brock Lesnar's first WrestleMania since 2023 and also his last as an in-ring performer due to his retirement from professional wrestling in August 2026.

== Production ==
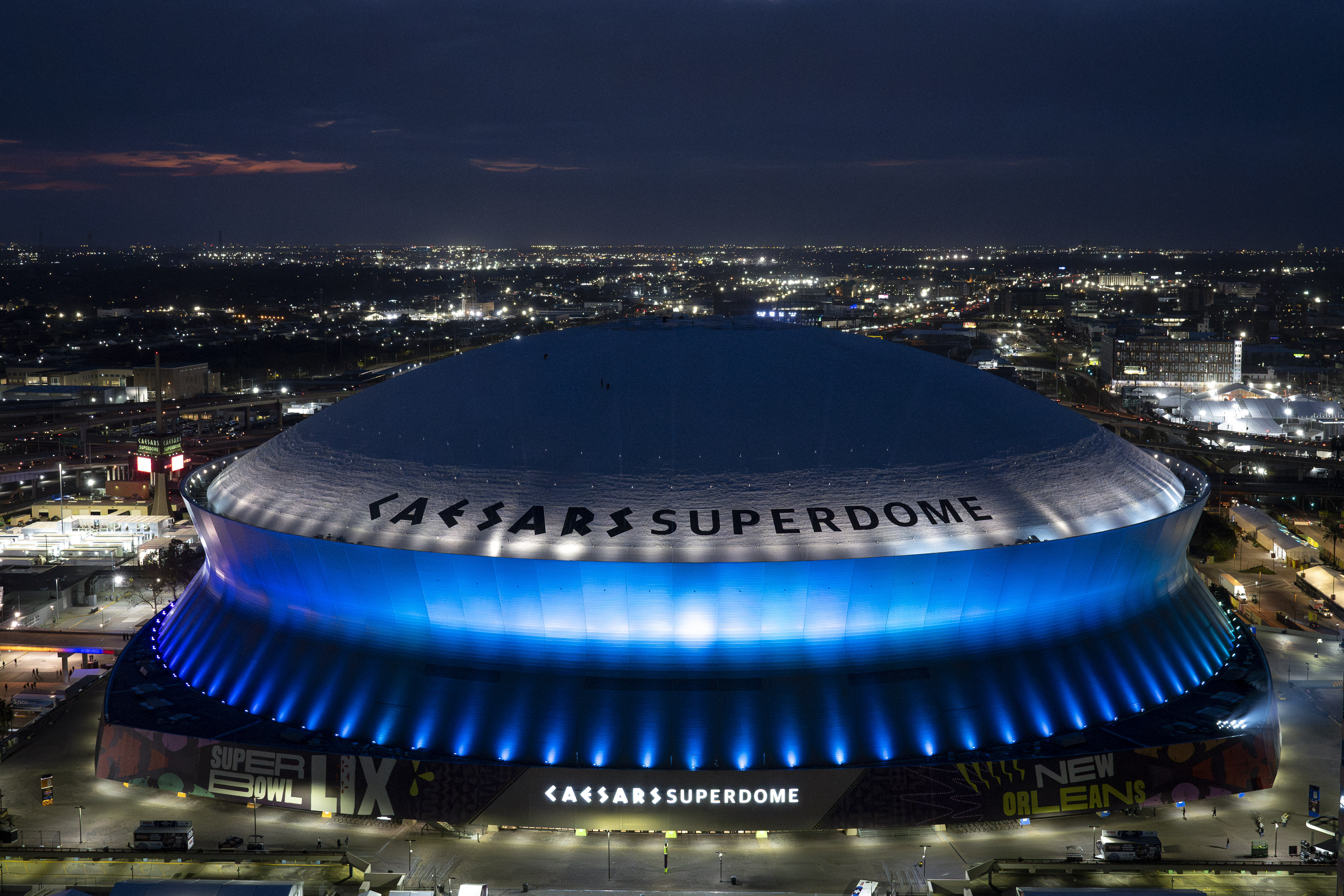
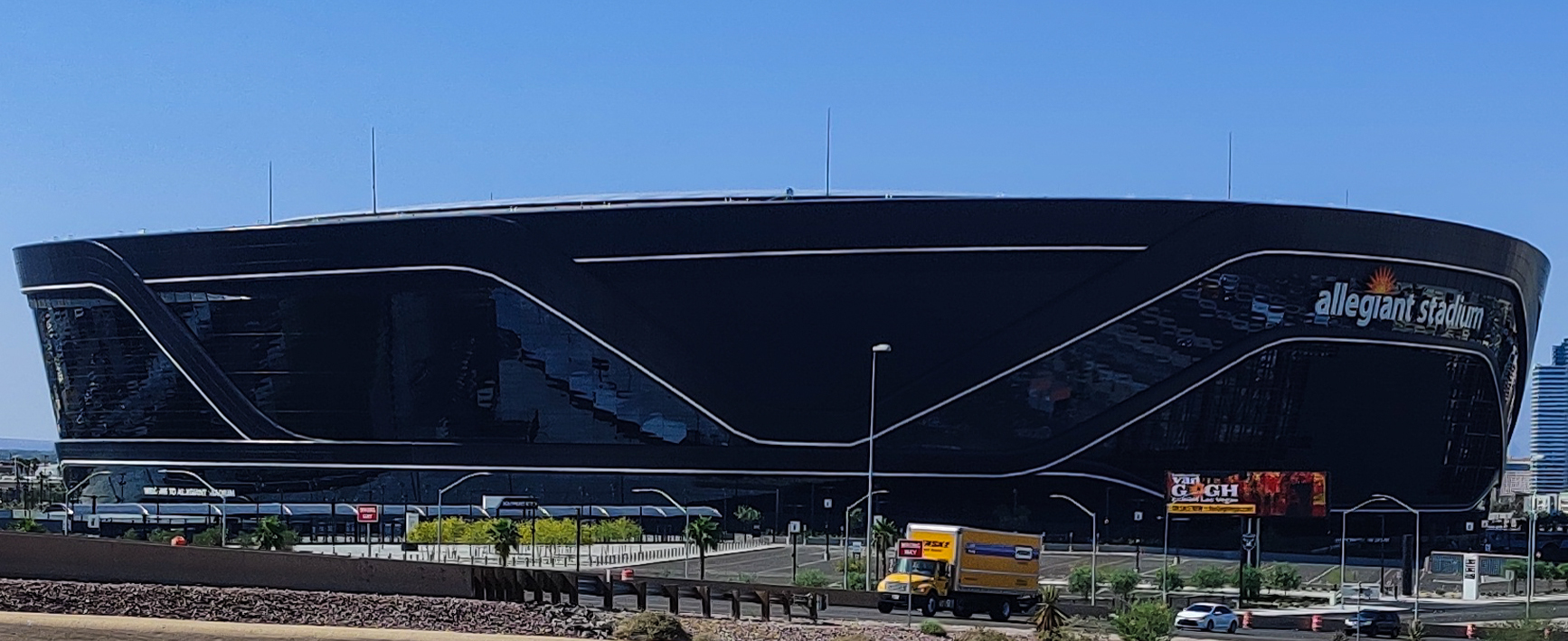
The 42nd annual WrestleMania was originally set to be held at Caesars Superdome in New Orleans, Louisiana (top); however, the event was moved to Allegiant Stadium in Paradise, Nevada (bottom) for a second consecutive year.

=== Background ===
WrestleMania is WWE's flagship professional wrestling premium live event, having first been held in 1985. It was the company's first pay-per-view (PPV) produced and was also WWE's first major event available via livestreaming when the company launched its former standalone service, the WWE Network, in February 2014. It is the longest-running event in WWE history and is held annually between mid-March to mid-April, featuring wrestlers from the Raw and SmackDown brands. It was the first of WWE's original four PPVs, including Royal Rumble, SummerSlam, and Survivor Series, referred to as the "Big Four", and as of August 2021, it is considered one of the "Big Five", along with Money in the Bank. WrestleMania was ranked the sixth most valuable sports brand in the world by Forbes in 2019, and has been described as the Super Bowl of sports entertainment. Much like the Super Bowl, cities bid for the right to host the year's edition of WrestleMania.

In February 2025, reports emerged that WrestleMania 42 would take place at the Caesars Superdome in New Orleans, Louisiana, the same venue that hosted WrestleMania XXX in 2014 and WrestleMania 34 in 2018. On the February 21 episode of Friday Night SmackDown, TKO board of directors member and part-time WWE wrestler Dwayne "The Rock" Johnson announced that WrestleMania 42 would emanate from the Caesars Superdome on April 11 and 12, 2026. However, on May 22, 2025, WrestleMania 42 was confirmed to no longer take place in New Orleans. While the specifics of the change were not revealed at the time, this came as part of a larger agreement, with New Orleans instead hosting a future WrestleMania as well as the 2026 Money in the Bank. Reports also emerged alleging that WrestleMania 42 would return the event to Las Vegas due the financial success of WrestleMania 41 in the area, while other reports suggested a possible international location.

During the 2025 Money in the Bank event on June 7, WWE confirmed that WrestleMania 42 would be held at Allegiant Stadium in Paradise, Nevada on April 18 and 19, 2026, marking the third WrestleMania in the Las Vegas area, including WrestleMania IX in 1993, and the third WWE event held at Allegiant Stadium, including the 2021 SummerSlam. Allegiant Stadium also became the first venue since the Atlantic City Convention Hall in Atlantic City, New Jersey, (Note: Due to sponsorship reasons, The Atlantic City Convention Hall was referred to as the Trump Plaza Hotel and Casino during the broadcasts for WrestleMania IV and WrestleMania V.) to host consecutive WrestleManias, having hosted WrestleMania IV in 1988 and WrestleMania V in 1989. Las Vegas paid US$6 million to host the event again, a $1 million increase over WrestleMania 41, with the city hoping it would boost tourism after a downward trend in 2025. Two-day combo tickets went on sale on September 24, 2025, with single day tickets on sale from November 28, 2025. The official theme songs for the event were the 2025 remix of "Back in the Saddle" by Aerosmith and Yungblud, and "Bones for the Crows" by Nickelback.

=== Broadcast outlets ===
Both nights of WrestleMania 42 were broadcast live on traditional pay-per-view worldwide. Additionally, they were available to livestream on ESPN Unlimited in the United States, SuperSport in Sub-Saharan Africa, Abema in Japan, and Netflix everywhere else.

This marked the first WrestleMania to livestream on ESPN's app, as ESPN acquired the streaming rights to WWE's main roster PLEs in the United States beginning with Wrestlepalooza in September 2025, following the expiration of WWE's contract with Peacock for these events. ESPN had originally been slated to begin broadcasting main roster PLEs in the United States with WrestleMania 42; however, as Peacock's agreement with WWE referred to the airing of a specified number of events, rather than on a fixed end date, the expansion of WWE's calendar—including all WrestleManias on Peacock being two nights since 2021 and the 2025 SummerSlam expanding to two nights, as well as the all-women's event Evolution in 2025—caused Peacock to reach the number of WWE events allotted in their agreement ahead of schedule. This was also notably the first WrestleMania to not air on the WWE Network since it launched in 2014 as the service permanently shut down on April 1 in the last four remaining countries that were still on the platform.

During the February 27, 2026, episode of Friday Night SmackDown, WWE announced that in the United States, the first hour of each night would be simulcast on ESPN2 and ESPN, respectively, marking the first PLE to air live on ESPN's linear channels.

=== Other WrestleMania weekend events ===
As part of the WrestleMania festivities, WWE held a number of events throughout the weekend. On April 17, WWE kicked off WrestleMania Weekend with a special "WrestleMania Edition" of Friday Night SmackDown, which hosted the annual André the Giant Memorial Battle Royal, won by Royce Keys. Subsequently, following SmackDown's broadcast, the 2026 WWE Hall of Fame induction ceremony commenced. After WrestleMania Saturday's conclusion, there was a comedy event, Kill Tony: WrestleMania, hosted by Tony Hinchcliffe. WrestleMania Weekend concluded with the Monday Night Raw after WrestleMania on April 20. SmackDown and Raw were held live at the nearby T-Mobile Arena, while the Hall of Fame induction ceremony was held at Dolby Live at Park MGM. Also as part of WrestleMania 42 week, WWE partnered with independent wrestling promotion Future Stars of Wrestling (FSW) to co-promote a WWE ID Showcase event at the HyperX Arena on the Las Vegas Strip.

In partnership with Fanatics Events, WWE also hosted the third annual WWE World at WrestleMania, a five-day fan convention held at the Las Vegas Convention Center. The event began on Thursday, April 16 and ran through Monday, April 20. It included interview panel sessions with WWE wrestlers, live podcast recordings, meet-and-greets with wrestlers, a large merchandise store with various memorabilia honoring WrestleMania's 42-year history, and live matches, with some of the matches broadcast on YouTube.

=== Celebrity involvement ===
Various celebrities from outside of wrestling participated in various capacities. The Las Vegas Mass Choir performed "God Bless America" to kick off Night 1, while singer-songwriter and Jonas Brothers co-lead singer Joe Jonas, accompanied by Jack Lawless and JinJoo Lee from Jonas's band DNCE, sang "The Star-Spangled Banner" to kick off Night 2. Rapper Lil Yachty was in the corner of his friend Trick Williams for his match at the event. Social media influencer and online streamer IShowSpeed wrestled in a six-man tag team match on Night 1, teaming with The Vision (Logan Paul and Austin Theory). Songwriter and actor Lin-Manuel Miranda narrated the cold open for both nights. The Wonder Years performed Becky Lynch's theme song for her entrance. Sports media personality and former WWE commentator Pat McAfee and rapper and singer Jelly Roll were involved in the main event of Night 1.

=== Storylines ===
The event included 13 matches that resulted from scripted storylines, with seven on Night 1 and six on Night 2. Results were predetermined by WWE writers on the Raw and SmackDown brands, while storylines were produced on WWE's weekly television shows, Monday Night Raw and Friday Night SmackDown.

==== Main event matches ====
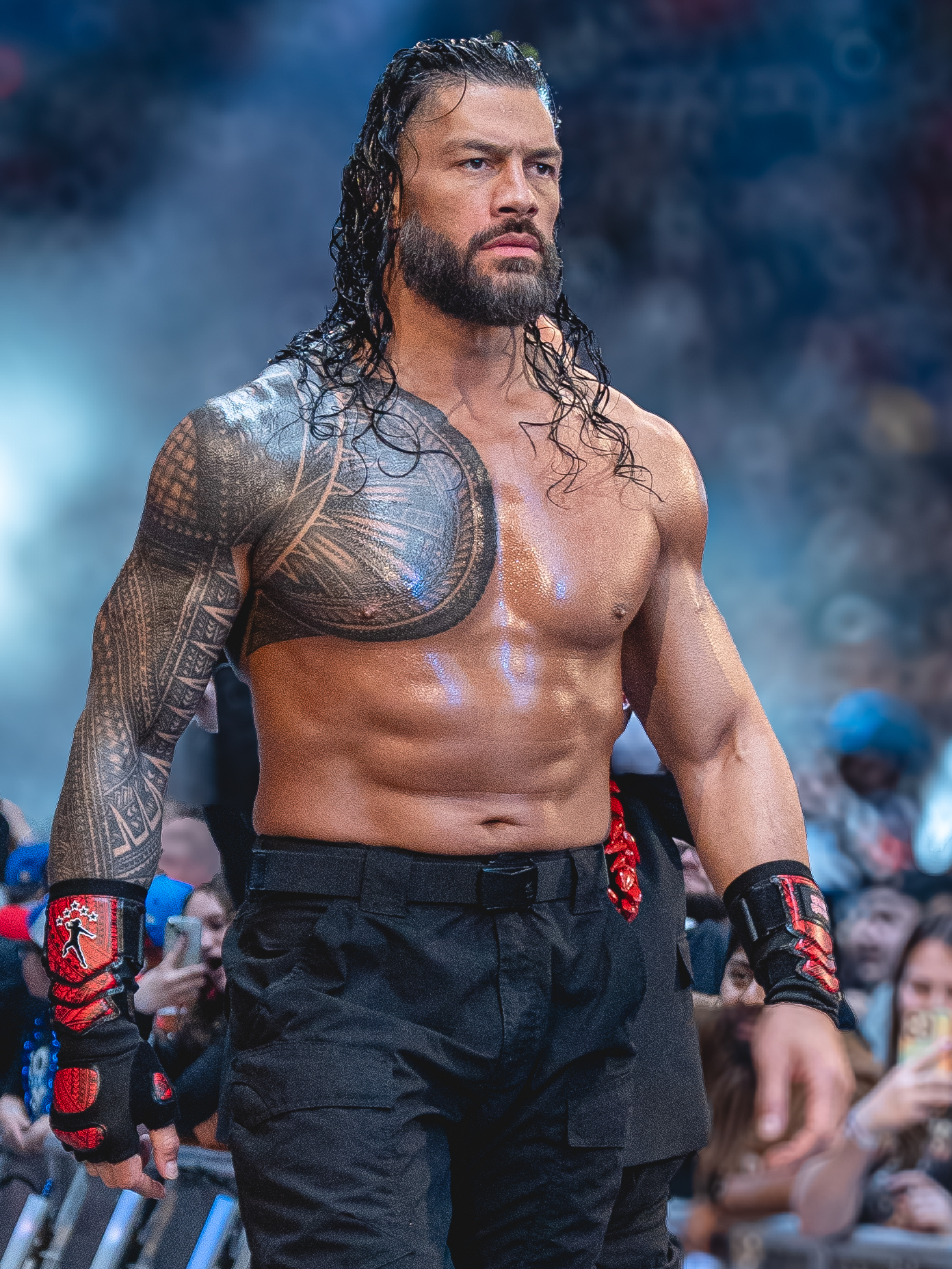
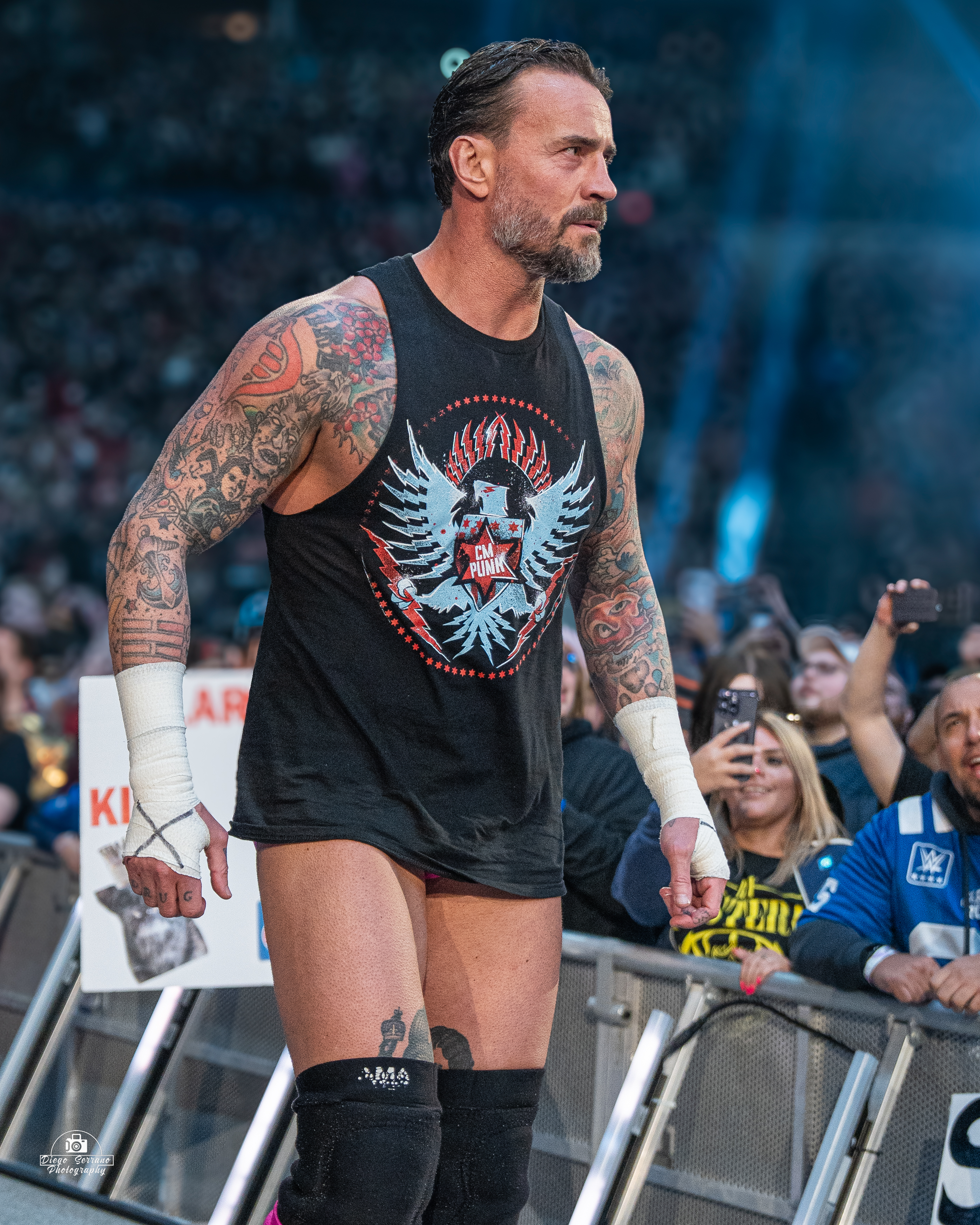
2026 Men's Royal Rumble winner Roman Reigns defeated CM Punk for Raw's World Heavyweight Championship in the main event of Night 2.

At the Royal Rumble on January 31, Raw's Roman Reigns won the men's Royal Rumble match, earning a world championship match of his choice at WrestleMania 42. Reigns appeared on the following episode of Raw where he was interrupted by Raw's World Heavyweight Champion, CM Punk, who claimed that Reigns could choose the easy path and face SmackDown's world champion or choose the hard path and face him. Punk reminded Reigns that he was ultimately responsible for Reigns's overall success in WWE as he was the one who brought him onto the main roster as part of The Shield at the 2012 Survivor Series. Punk also outlined how he was a fighting champion, in comparison to Reigns, who barely showed up to defend his title during his previous title reign. Reigns recounted his dislike of Punk, stemming from comments that Punk had made about Reigns on a podcast after Punk left WWE in early 2014, which caused fans to turn on him and made his job harder. He also brought up that Punk caused Paul Heyman to turn on him at WrestleMania 41 and informed Punk that he was ultimately the one responsible for Punk's return to WWE at the 2023 Survivor Series: WarGames, as management consulted his approval. Although Reigns had showed respect to Punk after they teamed up in the WarGames match at the 2025 Survivor Series: WarGames on November 29, Reigns decided that out of his overall hatred for Punk, he would challenge him for the World Heavyweight Championship at WrestleMania 42. With Punk retaining the title at Elimination Chamber on February 28, this confirmed his status as the defending champion. The match was later confirmed to main event Night 2. Two days before his match, Reigns stated that if he lost, he would leave WWE.

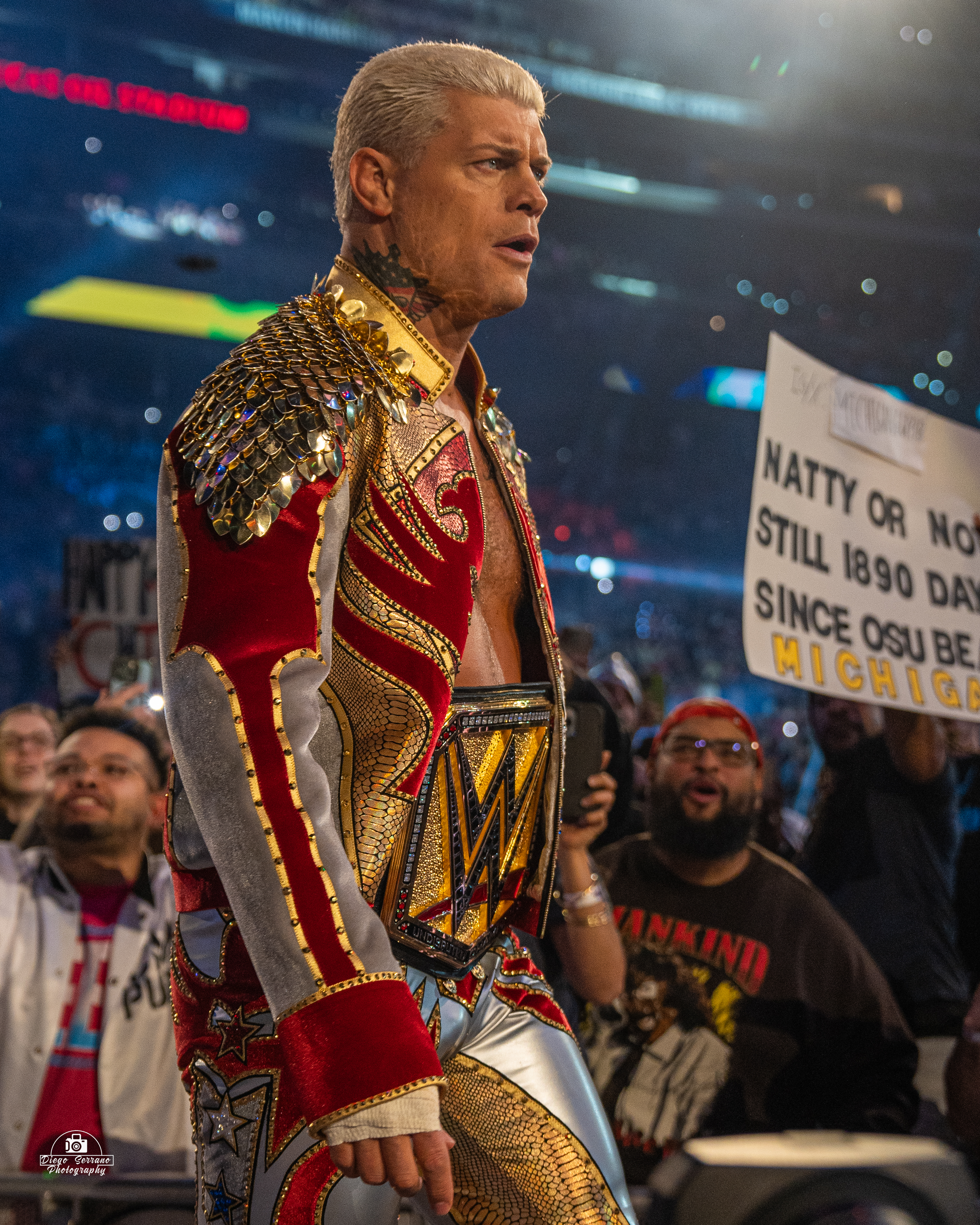
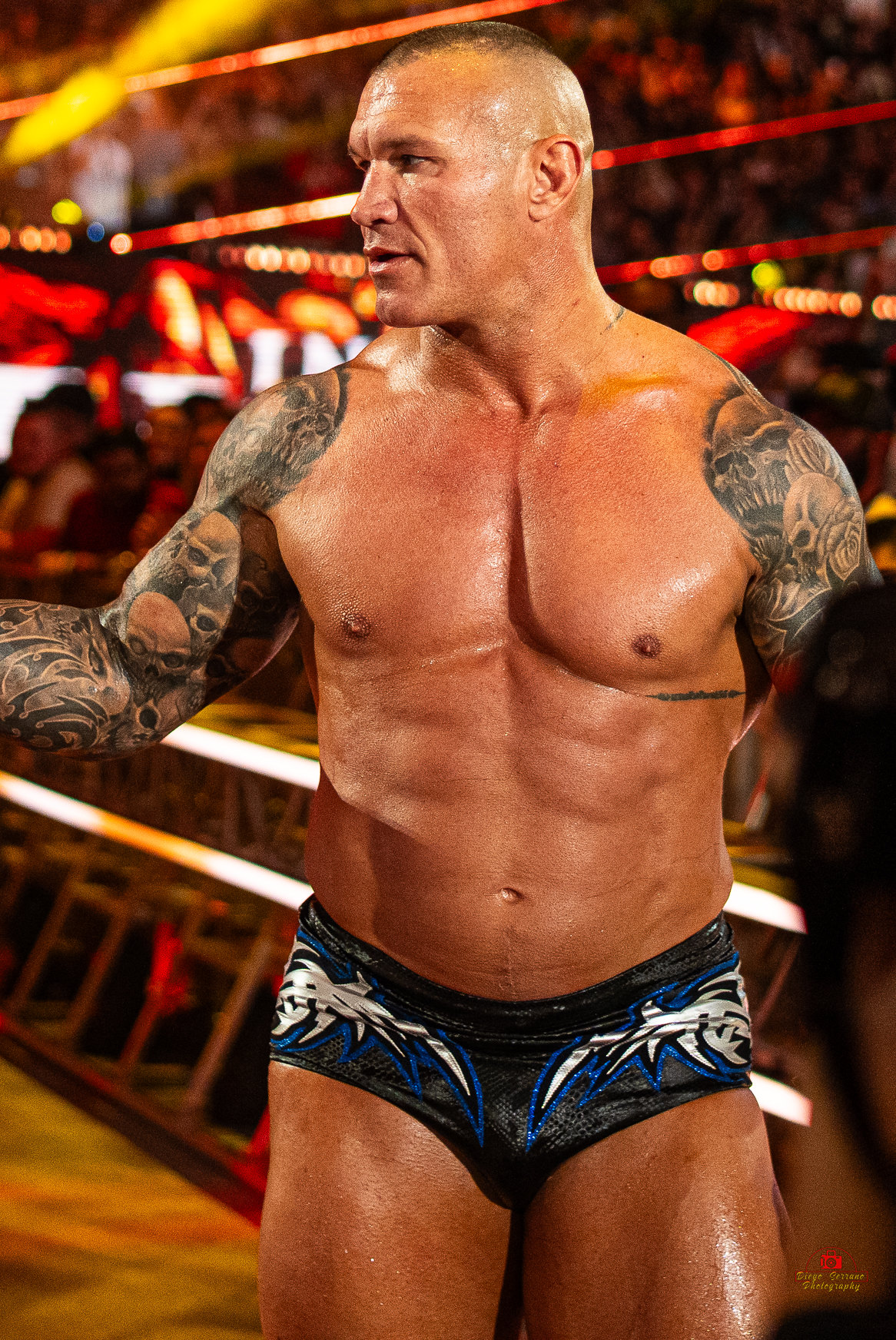
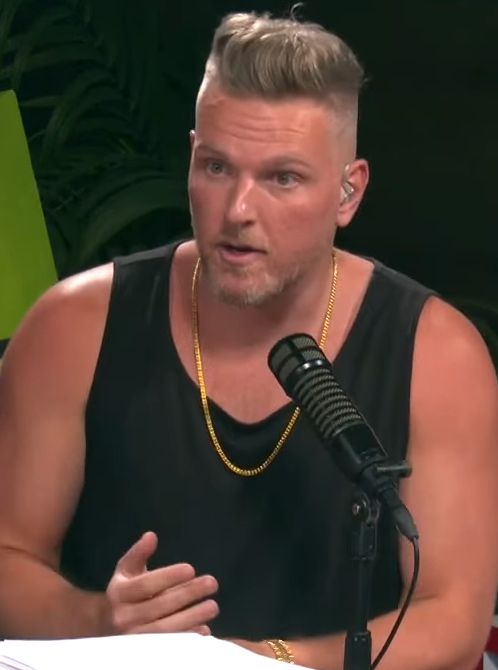
SmackDown's Undisputed WWE Champion Cody Rhodes retained the title against 2026 Men's Elimination Chamber winner Randy Orton in the main event of Night 1. Pat McAfee was in Orton's corner and promised to leave the wrestling business if Orton lost.

At Elimination Chamber, SmackDown's Randy Orton won the men's Elimination Chamber match to earn a title match for his own brand's Undisputed WWE Championship at WrestleMania 42, due to the Royal Rumble winner choosing Raw's world title. On that week's SmackDown, Cody Rhodes won the championship, confirming his status as the defending champion. Over the prior few months, a match between the two had been teased due to their history together as former members of The Legacy, and their relationship as mentor and mentee. The two had been good friends since Rhodes returned to WWE at WrestleMania 38 in 2022. However, during the contract signing on the March 13 episode of SmackDown, a conflicted Orton viciously attacked Rhodes, turning heel for the first time since 2021, with Orton determined to win his 15th world championship. In the weeks following Orton's betrayal, he was constantly on the phone receiving advice from a mysterious person, who was revealed to be Pat McAfee on the April 3 episode. McAfee then stated that he believed that WWE was going in a direction that nobody liked, and that Orton would save the business. Later, McAfee stated that if Orton lost, he would leave the professional wrestling industry forever. The match was later confirmed to be the main event of Night 1.

==== Undercard matches ====
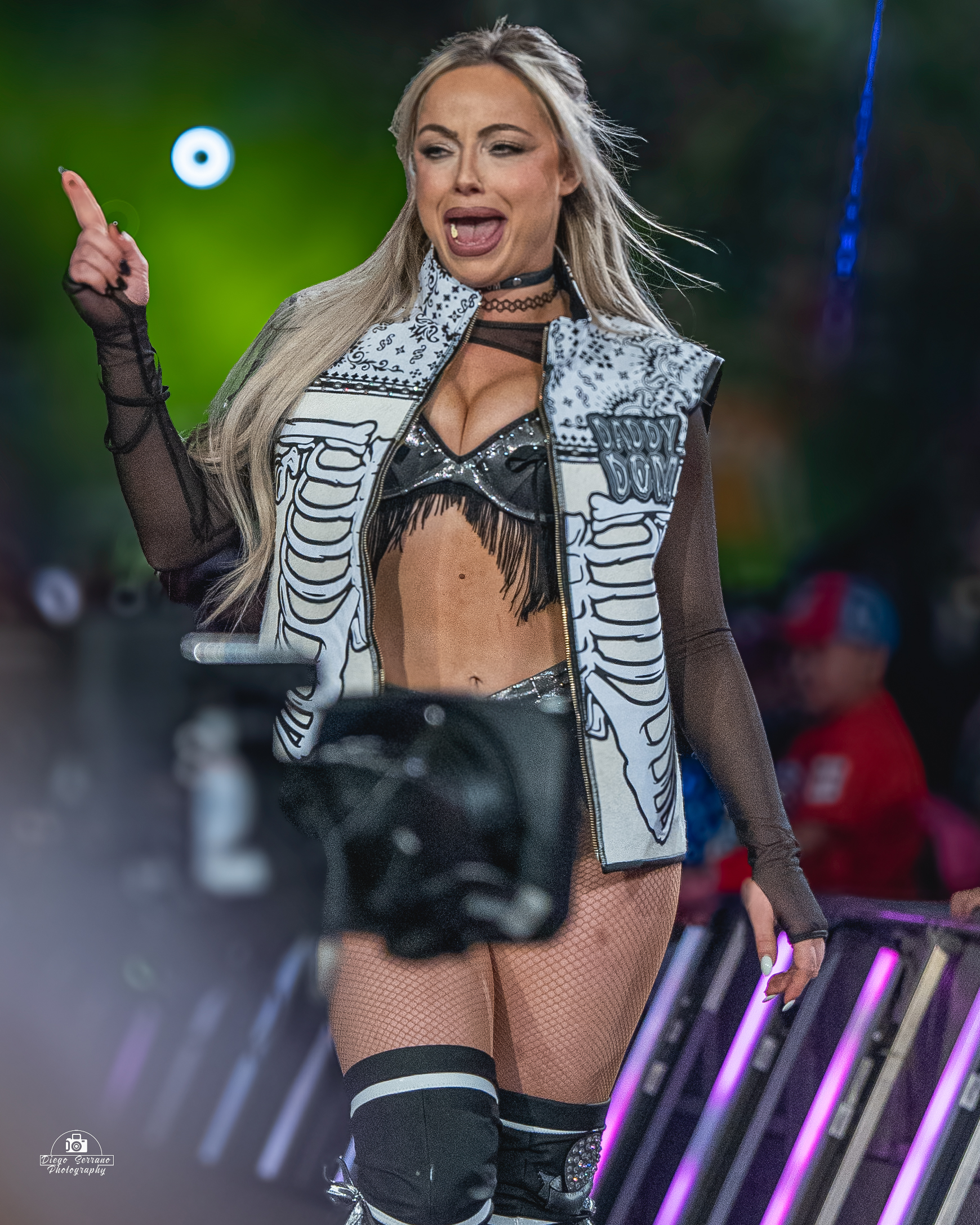
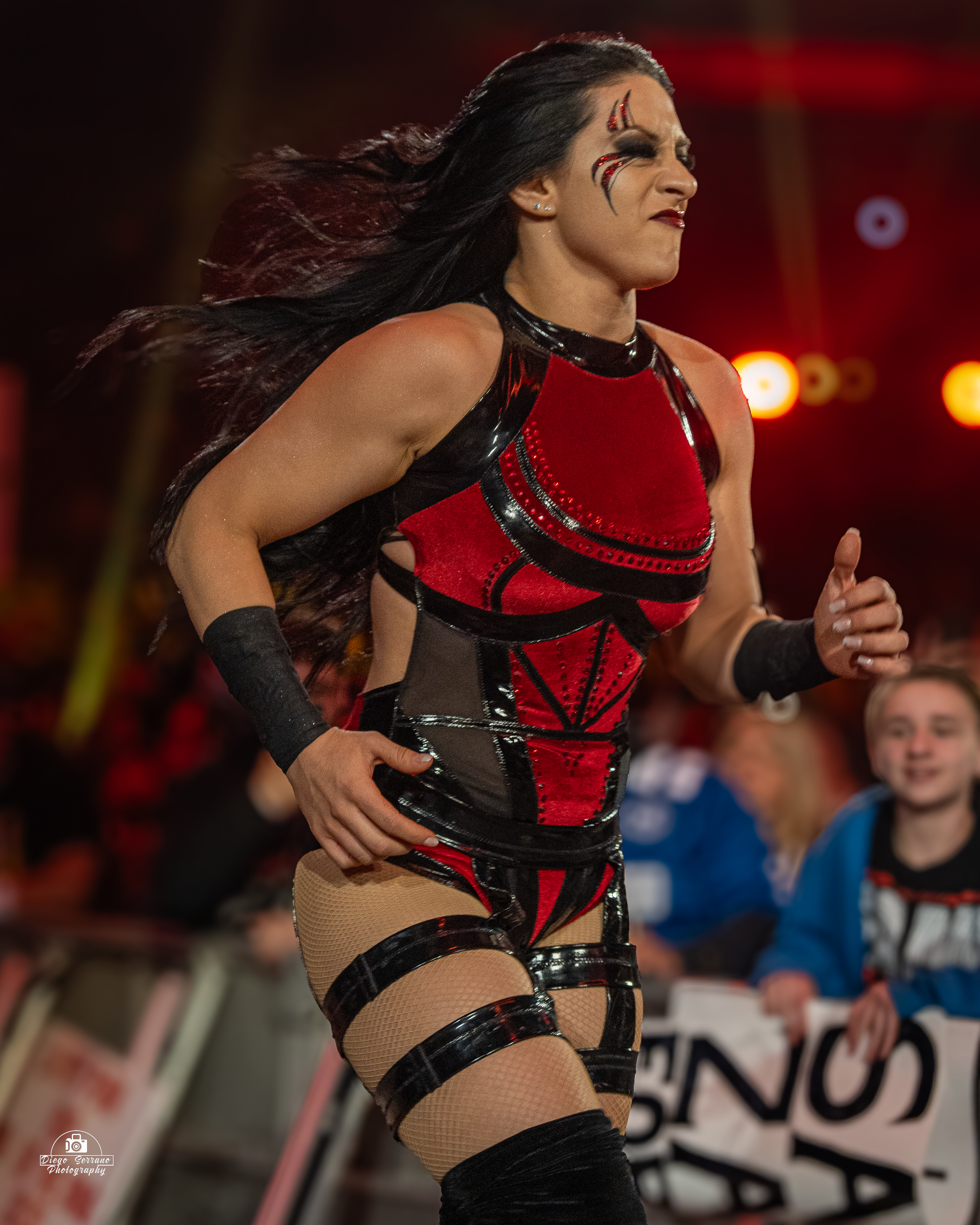
2026 Women's Royal Rumble winner Liv Morgan defeated Stephanie Vaquer for Raw's Women's World Championship on Night 1.

Also at the Royal Rumble, Raw's Liv Morgan won the women's Royal Rumble match, earning a world championship match of her choice at WrestleMania 42. Over the next few weeks, she appeared on Raw and SmackDown to confront the champions of each brand, leading to numerous altercations. On Raw on February 16, Raw's Women's World Champion, Stephanie Vaquer, interrupted Morgan's interview and chastised her, claiming that Morgan had been handed everything throughout her career and that if she chose her, Morgan would not win, which left Morgan in tears. The following week, Morgan, along with both champions, appeared where Morgan attacked Vaquer and posed with the title, officially declaring that she would challenge Vaquer for the Women's World Championship at WrestleMania 42. The match was later scheduled for Night 1.

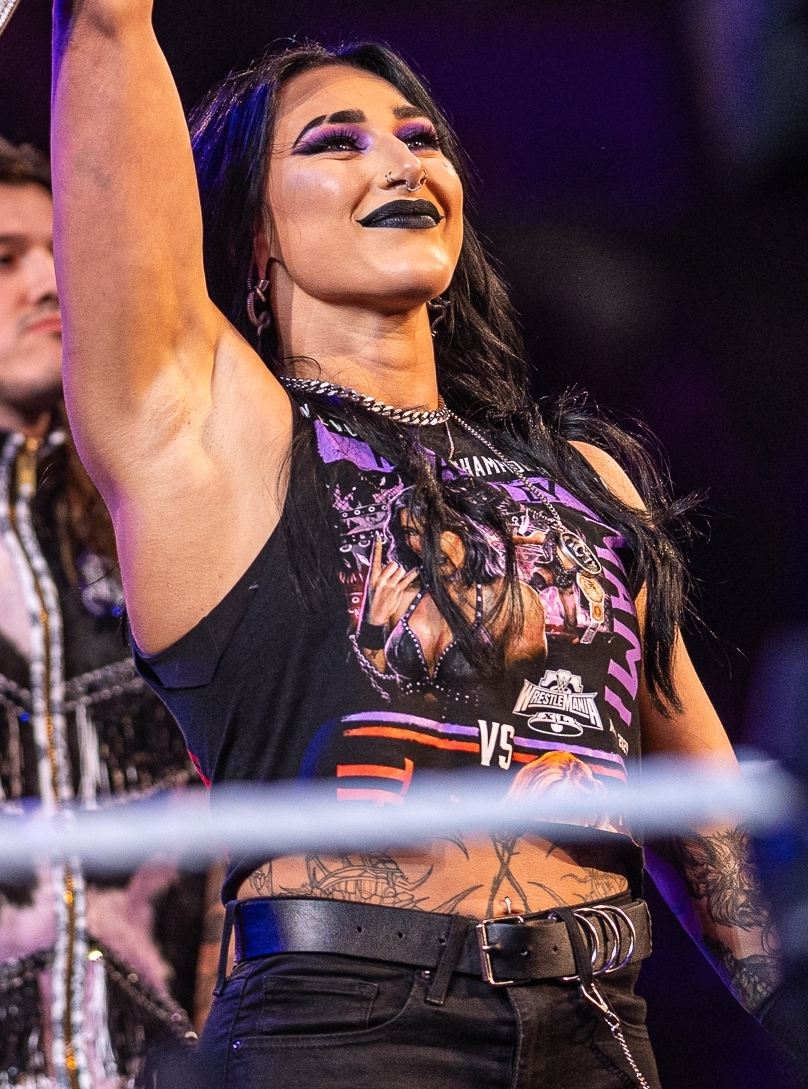
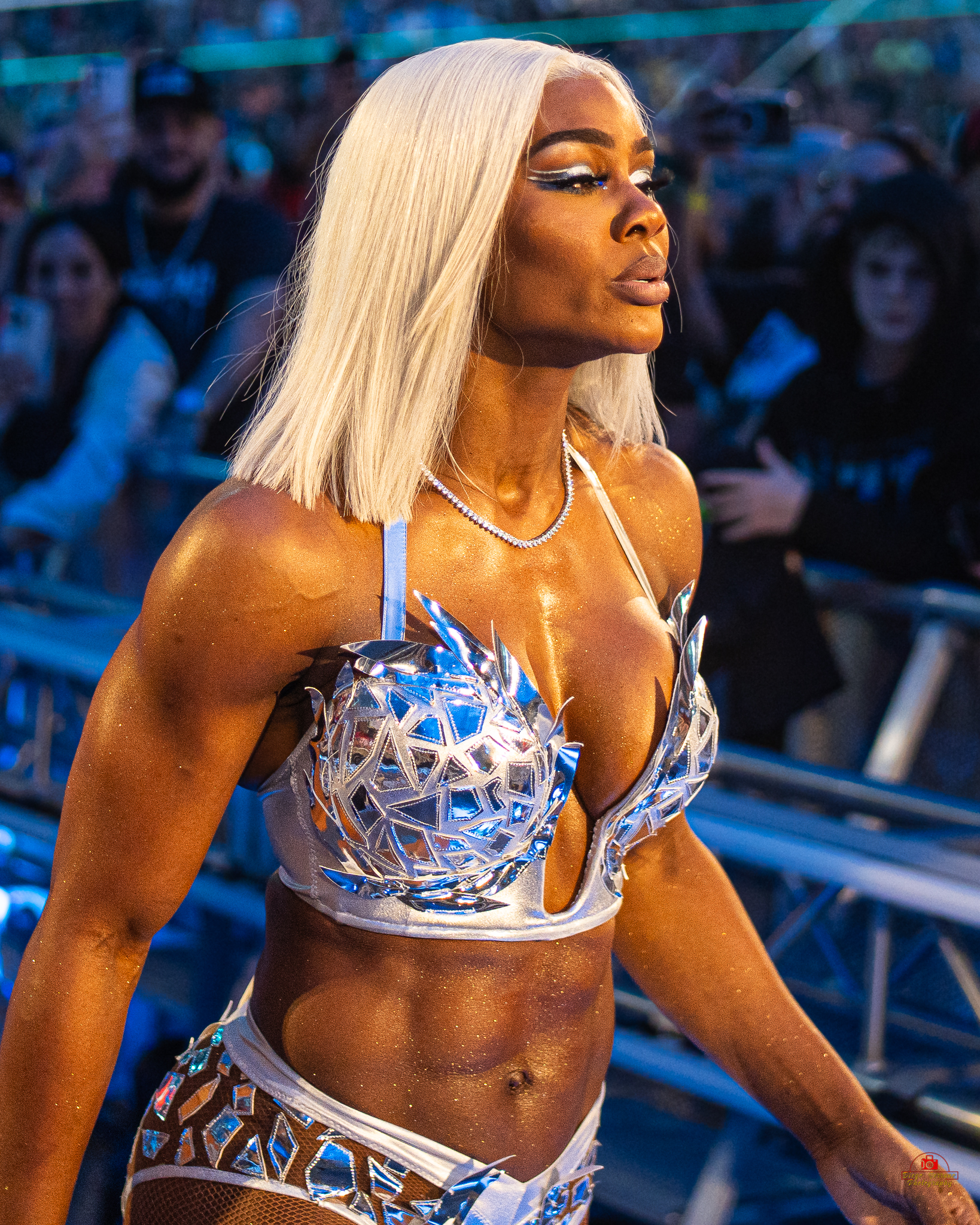
2026 Women's Elimination Chamber winner Rhea Ripley defeated SmackDown's WWE Women's Champion Jade Cargill on Night 2.

At Elimination Chamber, Raw's Rhea Ripley won the namesake match, earning a title match against Jade Cargill for SmackDown's WWE Women's Championship at WrestleMania 42 due to the Royal Rumble winner choosing Raw's world title. The match was later scheduled for Night 2.

On the February 23 episode of Raw, Brock Lesnar made his first appearance since the Royal Rumble. He was accompanied by Paul Heyman, who questioned who should face Lesnar at WrestleMania. Heyman claimed that no one had the courage to do so, and after revealing Lesnar's upcoming appearances, Heyman stated that anyone who wanted to face Lesnar in an open challenge at the event would just need to appear. On the March 16 episode, Oba Femi, who faced off with and was eliminated by Lesnar during the Royal Rumble match, confronted Lesnar and delivered the "Fall From Grace" powerbomb to him before accepting Lesnar's open challenge. The match was later scheduled to open Night 2.

On the September 5, 2025, episode of SmackDown, AJ Lee returned to WWE for the first time since 2015, aiding her husband CM Punk against Becky Lynch and her husband Seth Rollins. Lee and Punk subsequently defeated Lynch and Rollins in a mixed tag team match at Wrestlepalooza, where Lee forced Lynch to submit. Following a brief hiatus, Lee returned on the November 17 episode of Raw, distracting Lynch to cost her the WWE Women's Intercontinental Championship. At Survivor Series: WarGames, both women were part of opposite teams in the Women's WarGames match, where Lee's team won after she forced Lynch to submit once again. Lynch subsequently regained the title on the Raw on Netflix Anniversary Show, however, Lynch lost the title to Lee at Elimination Chamber when Lee submitted Lynch for a third time. On the March 16 episode of Raw after Lee successfully defended the title, Lynch returned and attacked Lee. The following week, Lynch stated that she wanted the title back, with Lee subsequently appearing and stating that she would give Lynch a rematch for the title at WrestleMania, which Lynch agreed. The match was later scheduled for Night 1.

On the January 2 episode of SmackDown, Trick Williams made his main roster debut and confronted Sami Zayn. Williams taunted Zayn about his failed opportunities and failure to win a world title and Zayn responded that he would teach Williams about becoming humble. Both Williams and Zayn then qualified for a fatal four-way match at Saturday Night's Main Event XLIII to determine who would challenge for the Undisputed WWE Championship at the Royal Rumble, however, Williams attacked Zayn after his qualifying match. Although Zayn subsequently won the fatal four-way, he failed to win the title at the Royal Rumble, after which, Williams continued to taunt Zayn about his loss. After Williams failed to win the Elimination Chamber match at the eponymous event for an Undisputed WWE Championship match at WrestleMania, Zayn also taunted him for his failure. On the March 20 episode, Williams was ringside during Zayn's match, and after a confrontation, Zayn attacked Williams. This distraction ended up costing Zayn the match. The following week, SmackDown General Manager Nick Aldis announced that Williams would compete at WrestleMania 42. Zayn also approached Aldis about a match at the event, however, Aldis revealed that there was not a spot for him at WrestleMania. Following Williams taunting Zayn further, Zayn attacked Williams and claimed that he would indeed compete at WrestleMania. Later that night, Zayn won the WWE United States Championship after Williams interfered. Aldis subsequently announced that Zayn would defend the title against Williams at WrestleMania. The following week, Williams's friend and rapper Lil Yachty appeared on SmackDown after Williams's invitation. There, Williams also invited Yachty to be in his corner at WrestleMania, which Yachty accepted. Later that night, Zayn retained the title, reassuring his status as the defending champion. The match was later scheduled for Night 2. However, after being attacked by Zayn on the April 10 episode, Williams stated the following week on the special edition of WrestleMania SmackDown that he did not know if Yachty would still appear at WrestleMania.

Since September 2025, Drew McIntyre had been feuding with Jacob Fatu, who was annoyed by McIntyre always blaming others for his failures, especially after McIntyre lost an Undisputed WWE Championship match at Wrestlepalooza. Fatu also announced his intentions to challenge for the title, and a match between McIntyre and Fatu was scheduled on the October 17 episode of SmackDown to determine the #1 contender for the title. The match never happened as Fatu was found incapacitated backstage, with McIntyre stating he did not attack him. Fatu would take a hiatus, while McIntyre continued after the title. On the January 9, 2026, episode, McIntyre won the title after Fatu returned and interfered in the match. The rivalry between McIntyre and Fatu intensified as Fatu believed that McIntyre was the one who attacked him backstage, and on the February 13 episode, McIntyre interfered in Fatu's Elimination Chamber qualifying match, costing him the match. Fatu competed in another qualifying match for the Elimination Chamber match on the February 27 episode, however, McIntyre once again interfered, costing him the match. On the following week's episode, Fatu interfered in McIntyre's title defense, costing McIntyre the title. The following week, McIntyre demanded a rematch, however, he was interrupted by Fatu, who took the blame for costing McIntyre the title and asked what McIntyre would do about it. McIntyre in turn stated that he would "quit" SmackDown, leaving the ring, however, he returned later that night and once again interfered and cost Fatu his match. A match between both men was scheduled for the following week, however, the match never happened as both men brawled during the entire episode. On the March 27 episode, after another confrontation between McIntyre and Fatu, SmackDown General Manager Nick Aldis scheduled a match between both men at WrestleMania, however, Aldis stated that WWE would not be responsible for anything that would happen between the two, and it would be an unsanctioned match. The match was later scheduled for Night 1.

Since late 2024, dissension had been brewing between Judgment Day members Dominik Mysterio and Finn Bálor, including at WrestleMania 41 where both competed in a fatal four-way match for the WWE Intercontinental Championship with Mysterio pinning Bálor to win the title. Despite the dissension, they continued to coalesce, however, tensions intensified on the March 2, 2026, episode of Raw. Bálor wanted Mysterio to defend the title that night without any help, which Mysterio agreed. During the title match, Mysterio asked both Bálor and JD McDonagh, who were at ringside, to interfere. As McDonagh was about to hand the ring bell hammer to Mysterio, Bálor stopped him. This distraction led to Mysterio losing the title. The following week, Mysterio confronted Bálor, who stated that he only wanted Mysterio to fight his own battles, but he realized that Mysterio was just a "spoiled little prick". Mysterio then shoved Bálor, who attacked him in response, however, he was outnumbered by The Judgment Day (Mysterio, McDonagh, Liv Morgan, and Raquel Rodriguez), kicking him out of the group in the process. Two weeks later, Bálor attacked McDonagh during Mysterio's title rematch, with the distraction costing Mysterio the match. The following week, Bálor announced that he would face Mysterio at WrestleMania 42. On the April 6 episode of Raw, Bálor was scheduled to face McDonagh, however, he was attacked by Mysterio and McDonagh before the match started. Bálor subsequently announced that he would wrestle under his "Demon" persona, which would be the first time since WrestleMania 39. The match was later scheduled for Night 2. During the Countdown to WrestleMania 42 Sunday pre-show, Raw General Manager Adam Pearce announced that the match would be a Street Fight.

On the March 16 episode of Raw, Je'Von Evans stated his intentions to challenge for the WWE Intercontinental Championship after champion Penta's defense against Dragon Lee. Penta retained the title, and after successfully defending the title once again two weeks later, Penta announced that after speaking with Raw General Manager Adam Pearce, he would defend the title in a multi-man ladder match at WrestleMania 42. Later that night, Lee, JD McDonagh, Evans, and Rusev were announced as the competitors of the match after qualifying during Main Event tapings after defeating Grayson Waller, Akira Tozawa, Rayo Americano, and Otis, respectively. On the April 6 episode of Raw, after Penta, Lee, and Evans won a six-man tag team match, Rey Mysterio made a surprise return and announced that he would also compete in the ladder match after speaking with Pearce. The match was later scheduled for Night 2. On April 11 at one of WWE's sister promotion Lucha Libre AAA Worldwide (AAA)'s shows, Penta successfully defended the title, reassuring his status as the defending champion.

In November 2025, then-WWE Women's Tag Team Champions Alexa Bliss and Charlotte Flair began a rivalry with Nia Jax. Shortly after, Lash Legend aligned herself with Jax, and they cost Bliss and Flair the title. At Survivor Series: WarGames, Bliss and Flair's team defeated Jax and Legend's team in the Women's WarGames match. After that, Bliss and Flair vowed to regain the title. At the Royal Rumble during the eponymous match, Nikki Bella returned after a month hiatus, while her twin sister Brie Bella also returned to WWE for the first time since 2022, subsequently reuniting with Nikki, reforming The Bella Twins, and both stated their intentions of winning the title. On the February 27, 2026, episode of SmackDown, however, Jax and Legend, now known as The Irresistible Forces, won the title. Bliss and Flair won a number one contender match and they faced The Irresistible Forces on the March 13 episode of SmackDown, but after an altercation between Jax and The Bella Twins, who were watching the match at ringside, Brie attacked Jax, causing a disqualification win for The Irresistible Forces. The Bella Twins also faced The Irresistible Forces in a title match the following week, which ended in a no contest after Flair interfered when Jax attempted to strike Brie with the title belt, and a brawl ensued between the three teams. On the March 27 episode, The Bella Twins defeated Bliss and Flair after Legend punched Bliss; during this match, Nikki suffered an ankle injury. Following the match, The Irresistible Forces attacked both teams, however, they were saved by Raw's Bayley and Lyra Valkyria, who were scheduled for a title match three days later on Raw. During the title match, Flair, Bliss, and The Bella Twins appeared at ringside, and Jax shoved Valkyria onto Flair and Bliss. This prompted Flair and Bliss to interfere and attack Jax, causing a disqualification win for The Irresistible Forces. Following that, all teams fended off The Irresistible Forces. Later that night, it was announced that The Irresistible Forces would defend the title against The Bella Twins, Bliss and Flair, and Bayley and Valkyria in a fatal four-way tag team match at WrestleMania 42. The match was later scheduled for Night 1.

On the March 30 episode of Raw, Gunther delivered an unexplained attack to Seth Rollins, also saving Paul Heyman from an assault by Rollins; Heyman was part of The Vision stable, which Rollins was the leader of, but was betrayed and expelled from the stable back in October 2025. After that, Gunther pointed at the WrestleMania sign and later that night, Raw General Manager Adam Pearce announced that Rollins and Gunther would wrestle each other at WrestleMania 42. The following week, Rollins alleged that Gunther had made a deal with Heyman, which Heyman denied. Gunther subsequently revealed to Heyman that he attacked Rollins for a personal reason, but that Heyman also owed him a favor for saving him. The match was later scheduled for Night 1. On the final episode of Raw before WrestleMania, Gunther revealed that the reason he attacked Rollins was simply because he wanted to prove that he was a better wrestler than him at WrestleMania 42.

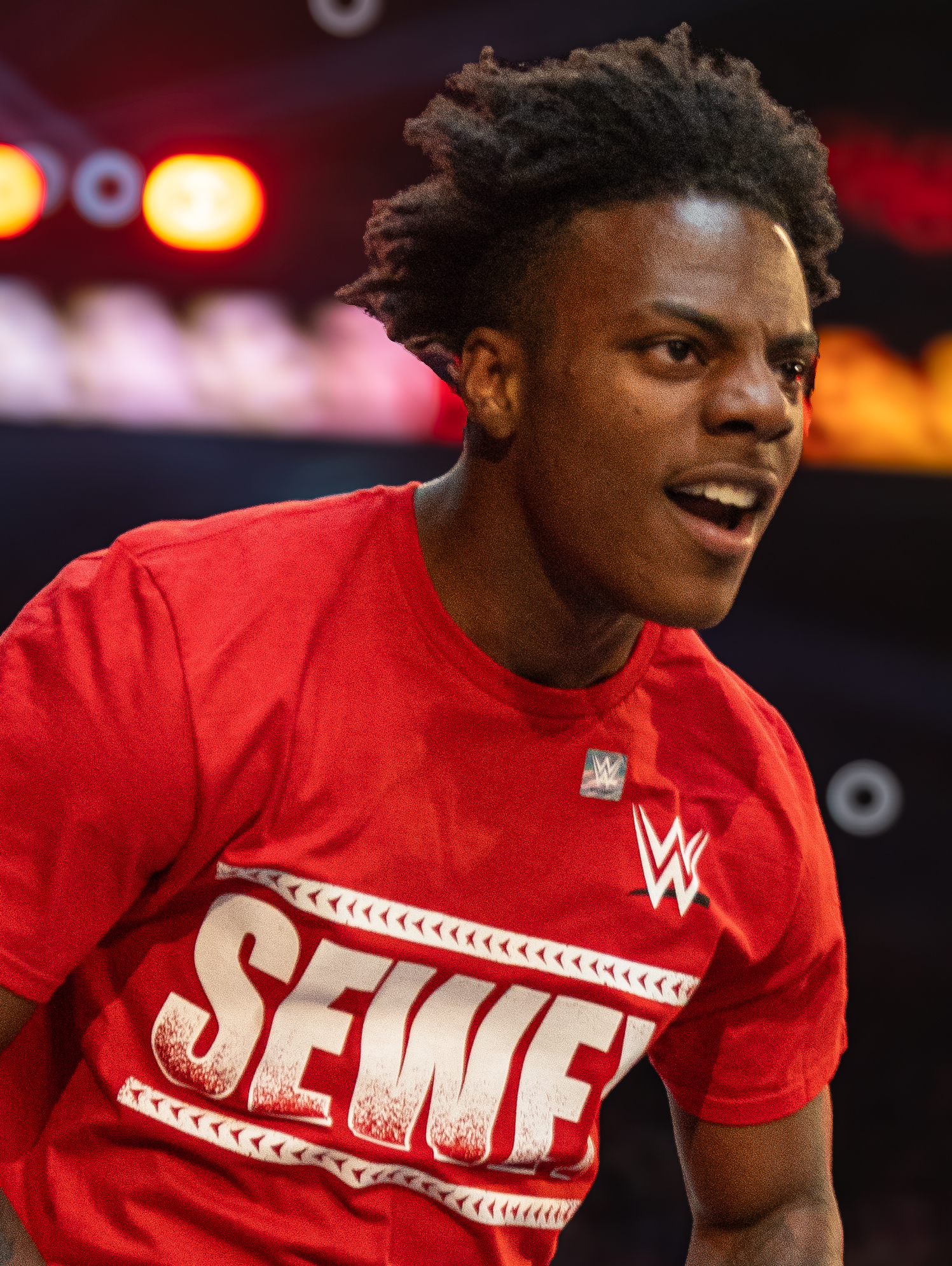
American social media influencer IShowSpeed competed in a six-man tag team match, teaming with The Vision (Logan Paul and Austin Theory) in a losing effort against LA Knight and The Usos (Jey Uso and Jimmy Uso).

For most of 2025, LA Knight and Jey Uso were involved in a rivalry against The Vision (Seth Rollins, Bron Breakker, Bronson Reed, and manager Paul Heyman). The rivalry intensified through the year, with Jey's twin brother Jimmy Uso joining him, reuniting The Usos. At Wrestlepalooza, Breakker and Reed defeated The Usos with Knight serving as the special guest referee. In October 2025, Rollins was excommunicated out of the group, and The Vision and Logan Paul's team subsequently defeated The Usos's team in a WarGames match at Survivor Series: WarGames when an unknown assailant interfered on behalf of The Vision. Paul subsequently entered The Vision and joined Reed in viciously attacking Knight on the December 8 episode of Raw, taking him out of action. During Knight's absence, the unknown assailant was revealed as Austin Theory, who joined The Vision, while The Usos won the World Tag Team Championship. During the Royal Rumble match at the eponymous event, Knight returned and eliminated Reed and Theory. Afterwards, Breakker and Reed both suffered legitimate injuries, taking them out indefinitely. Heyman stated that both Paul and Theory should focus on winning the World Tag Team Championship, and on the March 23 episode, Paul and Theory defeated The Usos by disqualification in a non-title match after Jey struck Theory with brass knuckles. On the following week's episode, a Street Fight for the title took place, where Paul attempted to use the brass knuckles, however, he was stopped by Knight, who was a guest commentator for the match. Influencer and online streamer IShowSpeed, who was watching the match ringside, picked up the brass knuckles and accidentally struck Knight. Speed left the brass knuckles in the ring, which allowed Paul to strike Jimmy with it to win the title. Three days later, Knight appeared during Speed's livestream and attacked him. The following week on Raw, Knight faced Theory. During the match, Paul shoved Speed into Knight. As Speed was trying to leave, The Usos appeared and prevented him from doing so. Theory subsequently won the match, and after that, The Usos and Knight attempted to attack Speed, who was saved by Paul. After that, Knight called out Raw General Manager Adam Pearce and then challenged Theory, Paul, and Speed to face him and The Usos in a six-man tag team match at WrestleMania 42, which Pearce sanctioned. The match was later scheduled to be the opening bout of Night 1.

==== Planned matches ====
On the October 13, 2025, episode of Raw, Bron Breakker and Bronson Reed attacked Seth Rollins, expelling him from The Vision stable. At the Royal Rumble, Breakker entered the Men's Royal Rumble match at No. 2; however, he was attacked by a masked man before entering the ring (allowing Oba Femi to eliminate him), who at Elimination Chamber revealed himself to be Rollins. In February 2026, Breakker was temporarily removed from television programming due to requiring surgery for a hernia. It was later reported that prior to Breakker's injury, a match against Rollins was considered for WrestleMania, but due to the injury, was ultimately not scheduled for the event.

== Event ==
=== Night 1 ===
Other on-screen personnel – Saturday
Role:	Name:
Host	John Cena
English commentators	Michael Cole
English commentators	Wade Barrett
Spanish commentators	Marcelo Rodríguez
Spanish commentators	Jerry Soto
Ring announcer	Alicia Taylor
Referees	Jessika Carr
Referees	Dan Engler
Referees	Daphanie LaShaunn
Referees	Eddie Orengo
Referees	Chad Patton
Referees	Charles Robinson
Referees	Ryan Tran
Interviewers	Cathy Kelley
Interviewers	Byron Saxton
Interviewers	Jackie Redmond
Interviewers	Peter Rosenberg
Pre-show panel	Joe Tessitore
Pre-show panel	Big E
Pre-show panel	Corey Graves
Pre-show panel	Wade Barrett

==== Preliminary matches ====
WrestleMania Saturday began with the event's host John Cena hyping up the crowd.

In the first match, LA Knight and The Usos (Jey Uso and Jimmy Uso) faced off against IShowSpeed and The Vision (Logan Paul and Austin Theory). At the start of the match, The Usos attacked The Vision leaving IShowSpeed all by himself to start the match. During the match, The Vision isolated Jimmy, allowing IShowSpeed to attempt a suplex, which Jimmy successfully reversed. In the climax, Theory held Knight and implored IShowSpeed to attack Knight, however, Knight countered, causing Theory to collide with IShowSpeed. Knight then executed the BFT on Theory to win the match. Following the match, Paul attacked IShowSpeed, blaming him for the loss. Paul positioned IShowSpeed on the broadcast table, and scaled the ring post, intending to perform a frog splash onto IShowSpeed. Knight and The Usos subsequently neutralized Paul with a 1D and then encouraged IShowSpeed to retaliate against Paul. Knight placed Paul onto the announce table and IShowSpeed executed a frog splash from the ring post, sending Paul through the announce table. IShowSpeed then celebrated with Knight and The Usos in the ring.

The next match saw Jacob Fatu fight Drew McIntyre in an unsanctioned match. Fatu performed a suicide dive into McIntyre before McIntyre could enter the ring. Fatu dominated McIntyre and introduced tables, chairs, and a red toolbox into the ring. McIntyre performed a clothesline on Fatu at ringside, procured a fan's mobile phone from ringside and took a picture of Fatu before posting it on X. Both men utilized the referee's belt and a wrench as weapons. McIntyre hit Fatu with a toolbox and a Claymore Kick however Fatu kicked out. McIntyre attempted to put Fatu through a table, but Fatu countered with multiple superkicks. After striking McIntyre with the toolbox, Fatu positioned him on a table and executed a double-jump moonsault through the table to beat McIntyre.

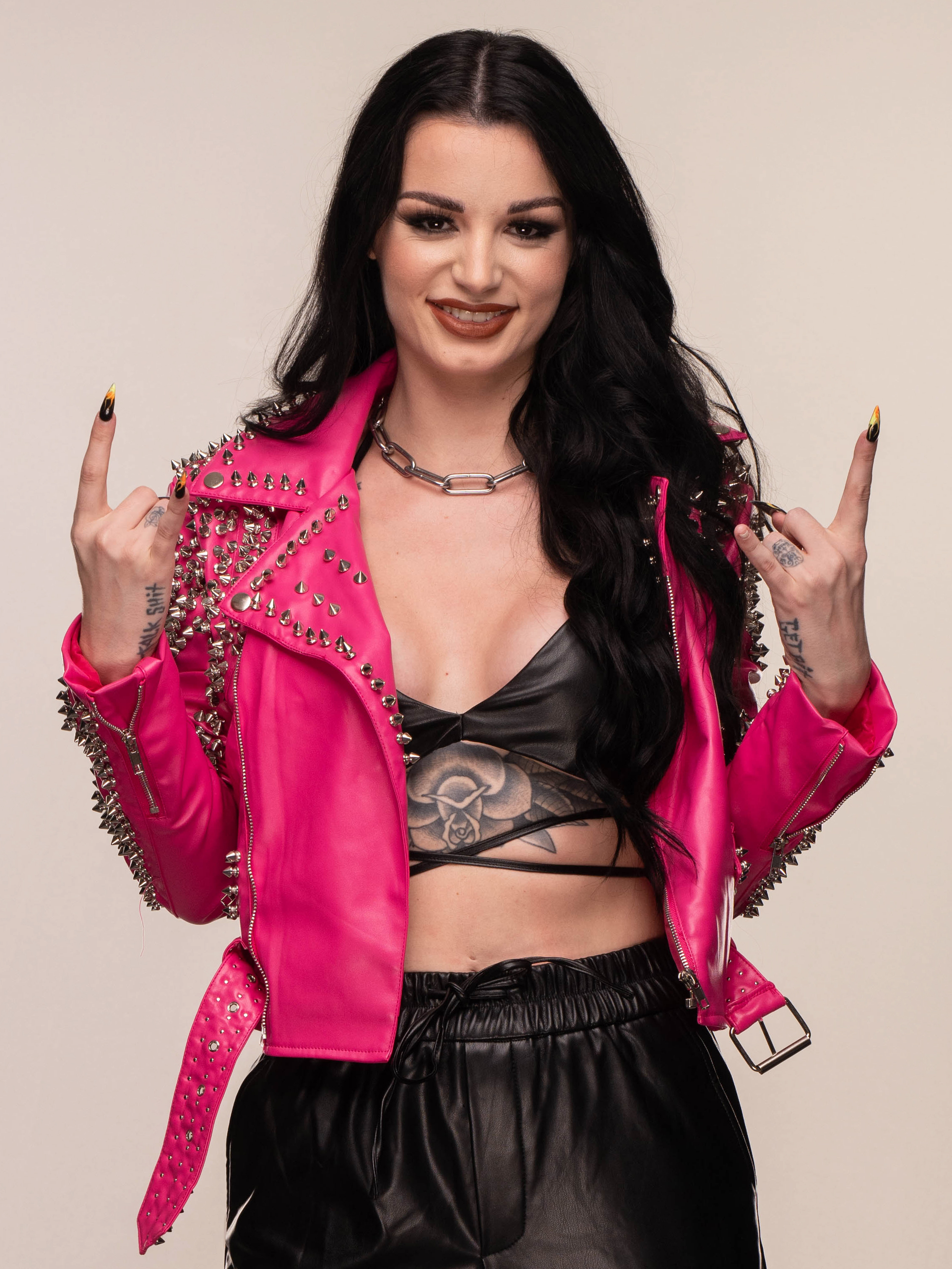
Paige made her return to WWE, teaming with Brie Bella to capture the WWE Women's Tag Team Championship in her first match in the promotion since December 2017.

Next, The Irresistible Forces (Nia Jax and Lash Legend) were scheduled to defend the WWE Women's Tag Team Championship in a fatal four-way tag team match against Charlotte Flair and Alexa Bliss, Bayley and Lyra Valkyria, and The Bella Twins (Nikki Bella and Brie Bella). When The Bella Twins came out, however, Nikki was in crutches due to her fractured, tore, and sprained ankle and announced the returning Paige as her replacement. Legend powerbombed both Bliss and Valkyria while they attempted a double superplex on Brie. Paige tagged in, delivering knee strikes to Legend and countering Valkyria's Night Wing with a Paige Turner. Flair hit the Natural Selection on Paige before Bliss tagged in to attempt the Twisted Bliss. As Bliss attempted the move, Nikki hit Flair with her crutch, and Paige countered the maneuver to hit the RamPaige and become the new champions.

Next, AJ Lee defended the WWE Women's Intercontinental Championship against Becky Lynch with Jessika Carr as the referee, who had ongoing tension with Lynch. Lynch dominated early, but her focus repeatedly shifted towards Carr, particularly after she thwarted Lynch's attempt to remove a turnbuckle pad. Lynch argued with Carr and shoved her, who responded by shoving Lynch back. Lee capitalized on the distraction, hitting Lynch's Manhandle Slam and later trapping Lynch in the Black Widow. Lynch managed to reach the ropes, narrowly avoiding a submission loss. After successfully removing a turnbuckle pad, Lynch pulled Carr into the path of a charging Lee. With the official incapacitated, Lynch drove Lee into the exposed turnbuckle and then executed the Manhandle Slam to become a three-time WWE Women's Intercontinental Champion.

The match between Gunther and Seth Rollins followed. Before the opening bell rang, Gunther blindsided Rollins with a powerbomb, prompting Rollins to retaliate with an eye gouge at ringside. Once the match officially started, Gunther landed a second powerbomb, but Rollins rallied, executing a Pedigree and a Curb Stomp for a near-fall. Rollins performed a superplex and Falcon Arrow combination, followed immediately by a sleeper hold that Gunther narrowly escaped by reaching the bottom rope. Rollins delivered two consecutive suicide dives, with the third attempt being intercepted by Gunther, leading to Gunther powerbombing Rollins onto the ring apron and the Spanish broadcast table. Rollins countered a subsequent maneuver on the table with a Pedigree, and followed it up with a Curb Stomp on Gunther on the English broadcast table. Bron Breakker proceeded to make his return to spear Rollins, after which Breakker threw Rollins back into the ring and Gunther applied a sleeper hold. With Rollins passed out, the referee called for the bell, awarding the victory to Gunther. Post-match Breakker came running back to deliver a second spear to Rollins, and made his way up the ramp with his manager Paul Heyman.

In the penultimate match, Stephanie Vaquer defended the Women's World Championship against Liv Morgan. Morgan landed a powerbomb, but Vaquer quickly retaliated with the Devil's Kiss for a near-fall. Vaquer hit Morgan's Oblivion for a two-count. Morgan's Judgment Day stablemates Raquel Rodriguez and Roxanne Perez arrived as Perez distracted the official and then Rodriguez struck Vaquer, allowing Morgan to connect with the Oblivion, though Vaquer managed to kick out. Vaquer fended off Rodriguez and Perez with a springboard dive. However, Morgan drove Vaquer into the steel steps. Morgan executed a Jersey Codebreaker from the middle rope and followed up with another Oblivion to become a three-time Women's World Champion.

Following the announcement of the night's attendance of 50,816 by John Cena, Bianca Belair appeared to announce that she and her husband, Montez Ford, were expecting their first child together, which caused Cena to add 1 more number to the attendance list, making it 50,817 for Night 1 of WrestleMania 42.

==== Main event ====
The main event was reigning champion Cody Rhodes against Randy Orton (accompanied by Pat McAfee) for the Undisputed WWE Championship. Before the match could start, McAfee struck Rhodes with a microphone. Rhodes retaliated by executing a Cross Rhodes to McAfee on a broadcast table. Jelly Roll appeared to perform an elbow drop on McAfee through the broadcast table, leading to McAfee being removed on a stretcher. Once the match officially commenced, Rhodes targeted Orton's historically injured back. Orton executed his signature draping DDT and powerslam, but he sustained a head wound after being sent into the ring post. Rhodes performed a draping DDT of his own. Then, Orton executed Rhodes' Cross Rhodes, with Rhodes responding with Orton's RKO. Orton inadvertently struck the referee with an RKO while blinded by an eye rake. Amidst the officiating void, Rhodes low blowed Orton before Orton connected with a mid-air RKO as Rhodes attempted a Cody Cutter. McAfee returned to the ring in a referee's shirt to count a near-fall for Orton, but Orton ultimately turned on McAfee, delivering an RKO to him. Capitalizing on the distraction, Rhodes executed a final Cross Rhodes to retain his title. Following the match, Orton struck Rhodes with the championship belt and hit him with the punt kick, standing tall over the champion as the night concluded.

=== Night 2 ===
Other on-screen personnel – Sunday
Role:	Name:
Host	John Cena
English commentators (Note: Entrepreneur Adam Weitsman was introduced as a "guest commentator" for the WWE Women's Championship match, but did not have a microphone and provided no commentary.)	Michael Cole
English commentators	Wade Barrett
Spanish commentators	Marcelo Rodríguez
Spanish commentators	Jerry Soto
Ring announcer	Alicia Taylor
Referees	Danilo Anfibio
Referees	Jason Ayers
Referees	Shawn Bennett
Referees	Adrian Butler
Referees	Jessika Carr
Referees	Chip Danning
Referees	Eddie Orengo
Referees	Chad Patton
Referees	Rod Zapata
Interviewers	Cathy Kelley
Interviewers	Byron Saxton
Interviewers	Jackie Redmond
Interviewers	Peter Rosenberg
Pre-show panel	Joe Tessitore
Pre-show panel	Big E
Pre-show panel	Corey Graves
Pre-show panel	Wade Barrett

==== Preliminary matches ====
WrestleMania Sunday began with the event's host John Cena hyping up the crowd.

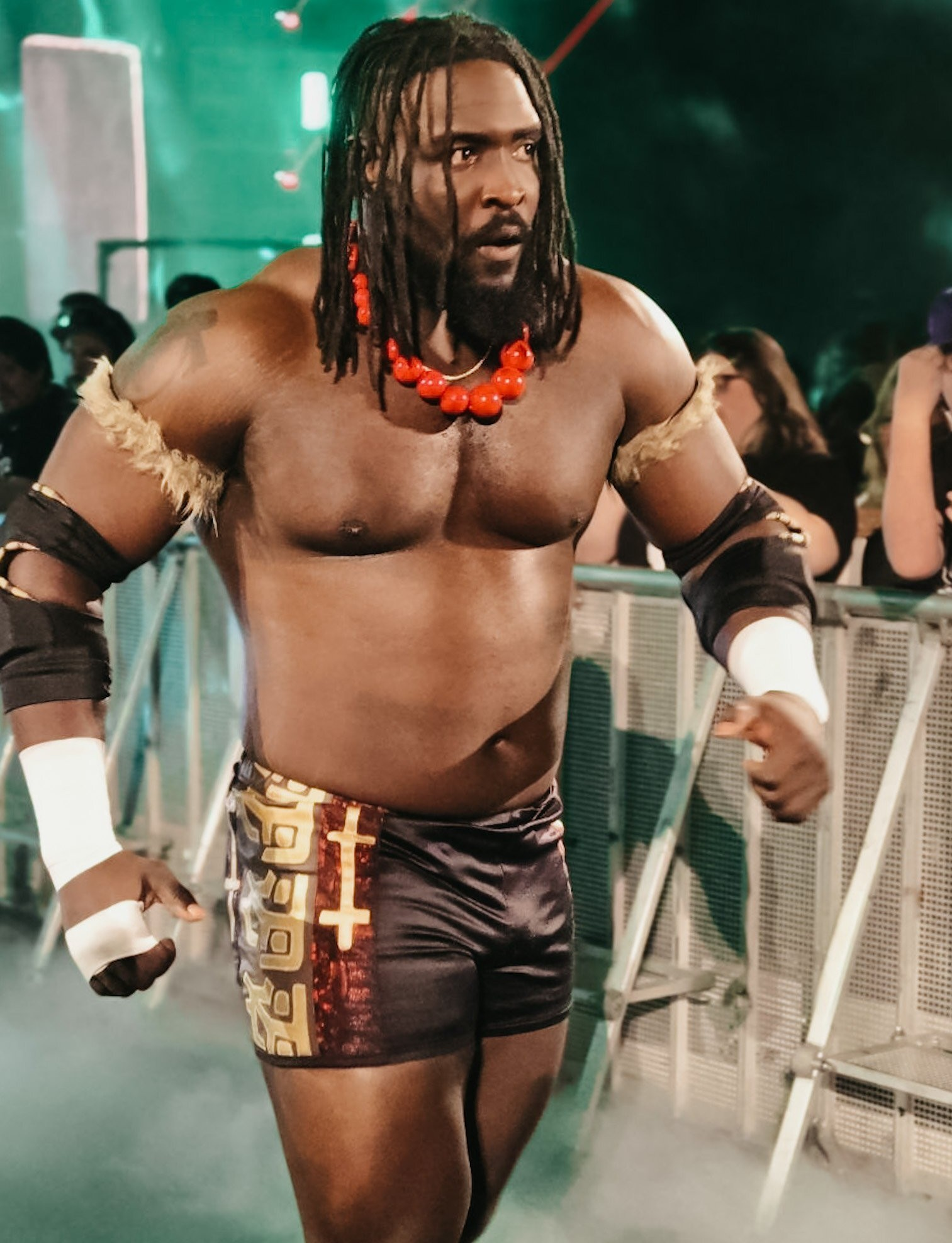
Oba Femi defeated Brock Lesnar in the opening match of night 2, which would ultimately be Lesnar's final match at a WrestleMania before retiring in August.

The Night 2 opener was Oba Femi versus Brock Lesnar. Femi was unaffected by Lesnar's offense, forcing a frustrated Lesnar to regroup at ringside. After using the ring steps to gain a brief advantage, Lesnar returned Femi to the ring and executed multiple German suplexes. Femi countered another suplex attempt and cornered Lesnar with strikes. Although Lesnar managed to connect with an F-5, Femi recovered quickly, responding with a chokeslam. Femi then executed the Fall From Grace to emphatically defeat Lesnar. After Femi exited, an emotional Lesnar remained in the ring. He removed his gloves and boots and left them in the center of the ring, teasing retirement. Lesnar shared an embrace with Paul Heyman before waving to the crowd.

Next, Penta put the Intercontinental Championship on the line in a ladder match against Rey Mysterio, Dragon Lee, Je'Von Evans, Rusev, and JD McDonagh. Rusev used a ladder to intercept a double suicide dive from Penta and Lee. Rusev slammed Evans onto a wedged ladder. Penta launched Mysterio into a West Coast Pop on Rusev, crashing through a ladder bridge. McDonagh executed a Spanish Fly on Lee off a ladder, while Penta performed a Mexican Destroyer on McDonagh onto a ladder bridge. Je'Von Evans attempted to claim the title while hanging from the hook after Rusev pushed his ladder away; Evans eventually recovered to hit Rusev with an OG Cutter. Penta neutralized Evans with a second Mexican Destroyer, and ascended the ladder to retrieve the title.

Sami Zayn's United States Championship defense against Trick Williams (accompanied by Lil Yachty) followed. Williams paid tribute to Booker T with a Bookend for an early near-fall. Zayn countered a Trick Shot with a Blue Thunder Bomb. Zayn drove Yachty into the barricade before delivering a brainbuster to Williams on the ring apron followed by a Helluva Kick. Yachty clotheslined Zayn over the top rope while the referee was distracted. Williams capitalized with a spin kick for a close two-count. After dodging a Helluva Kick, Williams connected with the Trick Shot to capture the United States Championship for the first time.

Next, Dominik Mysterio fought "The Demon" Finn Bálor in a Street Fight. Mysterio initiated an attack with a suicide dive and a kendo stick. Bálor reversed a suplex attempt to drop Mysterio onto a pair of chairs. Mysterio later executed a 619 and a frog splash, but Bálor kicked out of the pinfall attempt at a one-count. Mysterio drove Bálor through a table with a superkick. He put a steel chair in front of Balor's face while he was leaning against the ropes and then hit him with a 619. Bálor retaliated with a Sling Blade and a series of shotgun dropkicks, one of which was delivered while Mysterio's neck was in a chair. Bálor executed the Coup de Grâce, driving Mysterio through a table to secure the three-count.

The penultimate match was Jade Cargill versus Rhea Ripley for the WWE Women's Championship. Cargill dominated early with a crossface submission and a spinebuster. Ripley thwarted a Jaded attempt. Cargill successfully blocked a Riptide. Michin and B-Fab arrived to interfere on Cargill's behalf. When Ripley knocked B-Fab off the apron, the distraction allowed Cargill to nearly secure a pinfall. Iyo Sky appeared, executing an Asai moonsault onto both Michin and B-Fab on the floor. After fending off Cargill, Ripley successfully executed the Riptide to win the WWE Women's Championship.

After the night's attendance of 55,256 was announced, John Cena thanked the crowd as he concluded his duties as host. The Miz and Kit Wilson interrupted as Miz demanded a WrestleMania moment. Danhausen appeared, accompanied by little people dressed like him. After Wilson called one of the little people "toxic", Danhausen ordered another little person to hit Wilson with a low blow and then all of them attacked him. Then, Danhausen performed an eye poke variant of Cena's Five Knuckle Shuffle on Miz.

==== Main event ====
The Night 2 main event was CM Punk versus Roman Reigns for the World Heavyweight Championship. Punk came to the ring to "Miseria Cantare" by AFI, his former Ring of Honor theme, as his entrance. The bout began with a brawl at ringside, where Punk leaped off the barricade onto Reigns. Reigns placed Punk upside down in the tree of woe and delivered three consecutive Superman Punches. Reigns used the steel steps to strike Punk, causing the champion's forehead to bleed, before executing a powerbomb through the English broadcast table. Punk connected with a GTS, which Reigns survived. Punk kicked out of a subsequent spear. Punk donned Reigns' Ula Fala and attempted a spear, which Reigns countered into a guillotine choke before Punk countered it with a roll-up for a two-count. The two engaged in a rapid sequence of submission counters before leveling one another with simultaneous clotheslines. Punk threw his wrist tape at Reigns to distract the referee so he could deliver a low blow, following up with a second GTS for a near-fall. Punk followed this with a diving elbow drop, sending Reigns through a second broadcast table. Despite hitting a third GTS, Punk was too exhausted to immediately capitalize. Reigns managed to deliver two consecutive spears to best Punk and become the new World Heavyweight Champion.

== Reception ==
The first hour of Night 1 on ESPN2 drew 1,616,000 viewers with a 0.62 rating in the 18 to 49 demo, while the first hour of Night 2 on ESPN drew 1,822,000 viewers with a 0.65 rating in the 18 to 49 demo.

Kevin Berge of Bleacher Report gave Night 1 a grade of D+. Although he praised the unsanctioned match between Jacob Fatu and Drew McIntyre and the match between Seth Rollins and Gunther, Robert Jackman of Yahoo Sports called Night 1 "miserable" and "uninspired", opining that it had fallen short even of the low bar set by the widely panned main event of WrestleMania 41 Night 2. The inclusion of McAfee and Roll in the main events was heavily critiziced before the event. There were reports that, despite WWE planning to use Aleister Black in the storyline, they were overruled by TKO and its CEO Ari Emanuel, and instead mandated to use McAfee instead.

Wade Keller of Pro Wrestling Torch considered the match as taking "forever to get out of first gear", but when it did, the match "was dramatic, but hardly athletic". However, "the McAfee situation just muddied the story of the match" while stating that "it's hard to separate fan fatigue with Cody from just the effects of years of lousy, uneven booking of him". Shakiel Mahjouri of CBS Sports gave it a grade of C+, stated that WWE "washed their hands of the celebrity nonsense, leaned into speculation about Orton's health and built towards an electrifying finish", but after McAfee showed up, "everything imploded". McAfee counting the pinfall and Orton turning on him "made no sense and completely took attention away from what was shaping up to be a great match". Jordan Mendoza of USA Today called it a "frustrating and confusing" main event and a "really odd end to night 1."

Dave Meltzer of Wrestling Observer Newsletter said on his podcast that the night 2 main event was "one of the best matches in Wrestlemania history." Scott Carlson of WhatCulture called the main event an "incredible" match with "great action and brilliant pacing," ending "a really good, solid show". Contrasting his negative Night 1 review, Kevin Berge gave the event an A− grade, with particular praise given to the main event and the Oba Femi vs Brock Lesnar match.

Meltzer, rating the Night 1 matches on a scale of five stars, rated the opening six-man tag team match 2.5 stars, the Unsanctioned match 4.25 stars, the Women's Tag Team Championship match 2.75 stars, the Women's Intercontinental Championship match 2.75 stars, the Rollins–Gunther bout 4.5 stars, the Women's World Championship match two stars, and the Undisputed WWE Championship main event between Cody Rhodes and Randy Orton 3.5 stars. For Night 2, he scored Femi vs. Lesnar 4 stars, the Intercontinental Championship Ladder match 4.75 stars, the United States Championship match three stars, the Bálor–Mysterio Street Fight 3.5 stars, the WWE Women's Championship match 3.25 stars, and the World Heavyweight Championship main event between CM Punk and Roman Reigns 5 stars (the highest rating of the weekend, and the first singles WrestleMania main event to be accredited 5 stars by Meltzer).

== Aftermath ==
This would be the final WrestleMania to livestream on Abema in Japan, which merged under Netflix in October.

=== Raw ===
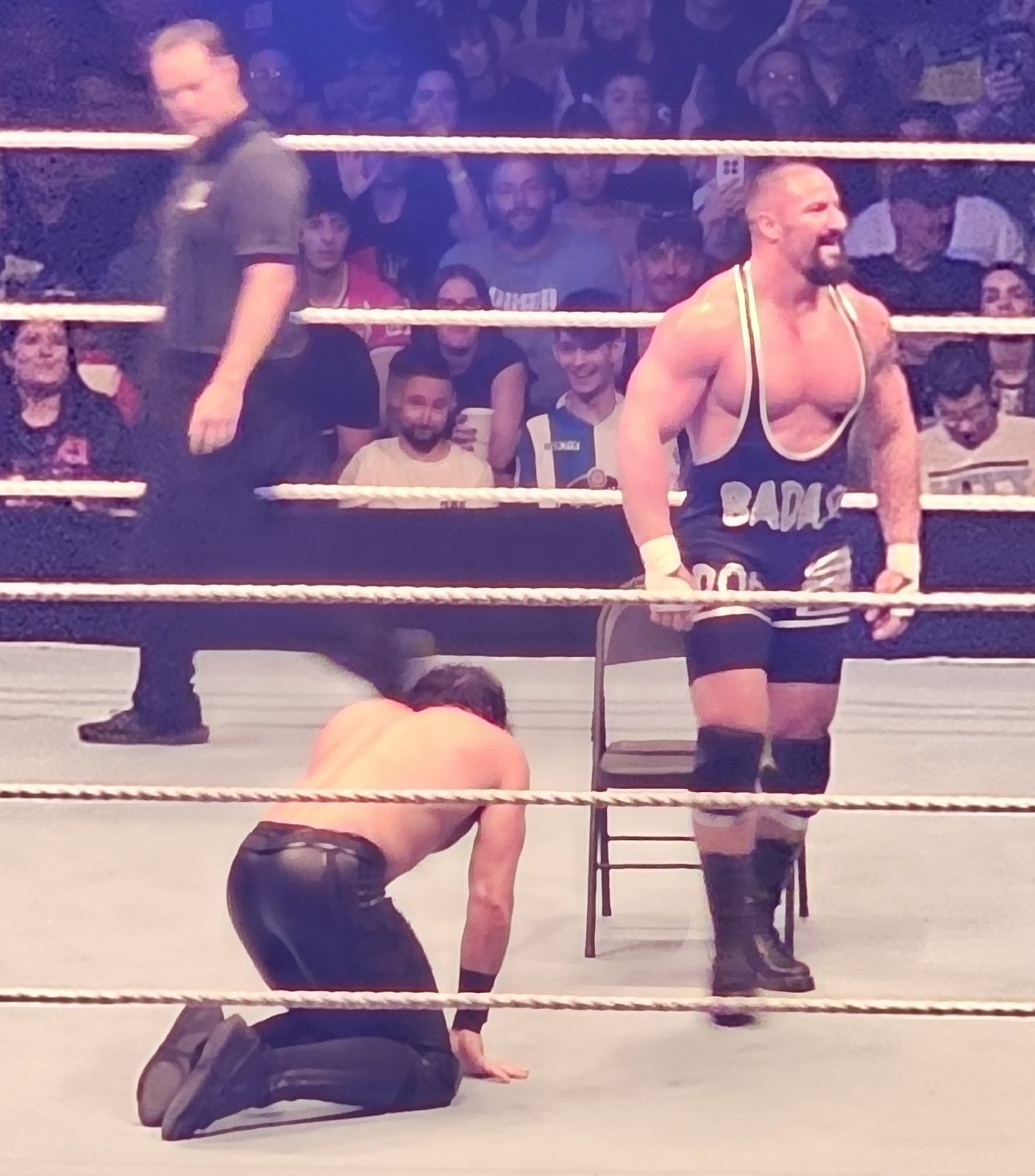
After WrestleMania, Bron Breakker feuded with the former Vision leader Seth Rollins.

The Raw after WrestleMania opened with Oba Femi, who entered to a massive ovation. He simply stated "the ruler has arrived", before posing for the crowd and exiting. WWE also began promoting that Brock Lesnar had retired following his loss to Femi at WrestleMania. During the May 18 episode, after Femi made his entrance and was posing in the ring, he was attacked by a returning Lesnar, who performed four F5s on Femi. Later backstage, Paul Heyman handed Raw General Manager Adam Pearce a contract for a rematch between Lesnar and Femi at Clash in Italy, which Lesnar won. They had a third and final match at SummerSlam, which was a Hell in a Cell match, which Femi won. After the match on The Pat McAfee Show the next day, Lesnar confirmed that he was retired.

CM Punk spoke about the loss of the World Heavyweight Championship and the loss of several of his loved ones. Undisputed WWE Champion Cody Rhodes then interrupted and Punk teased challenging for the Undisputed title, and Rhodes told Punk he had a title shot waiting for him whenever he wanted it. At Night of Champions on June 27, Rhodes lost his title. On the July 6 episode of Raw, Rhodes was scheduled for a title match, but was attacked backstage. He was replaced by a returning Punk, who would win the Undisputed WWE Championship title. On the July 10 episode of SmackDown, Rhodes confronted Undisputed WWE Champion Punk and challenged him to a tite match at SummerSlam, which Punk won.

Liv Morgan celebrated her Women's World Championship victory with the rest of the Judgment Day; however, she was interrupted by the main roster debut of Sol Ruca. Ruca challenged Morgan to a match, which Morgan won.

The Vision (Bron Breakker, Logan Paul, Austin Theory, and Paul Heyman) spoke about WrestleMania until Seth Rollins, armed with a steel chair, attacked The Vision, who eventually overpowered Rollins. The Street Profits (Montez Ford and Angelo Dawkins) emerged to side with Rollins. At the end of the segment, Breakker performed another spear on Rollins.

In the main event segment of Raw, new World Heavyweight Champion Roman Reigns was flanked with his cousins The Usos (Jey Uso and Jimmy Uso), who had reunited The Bloodline stable celebrating Reigns' victory. They were confronted by another one of their cousins, Jacob Fatu, who had been transferred to Raw, challenging him to a title match at Backlash. Reigns stated that he would announce his decision regarding the challenge on the following week's episode. There, the match was made official.

=== SmackDown ===
As a result of her WWE Women's Championship win, Rhea Ripley was transferred to the SmackDown brand. There she was confronted by the main roster debut of Fatal Influence (Jacy Jayne, Fallon Henley and Lainey Reid), who took out both reigning WWE Women's Tag Team Champions Paige and Brie Bella, who competed against Charlotte Flair and Alexa Bliss for the title, while later that night, Ripley faced Jayne in a non-title match which ended in a no-contest after Fatal Influence interfered.

On that same episode, Jacob Fatu explained why he wanted to challenge Reigns for the World Heavyweight Championship at Backlash and The Usos warned him before they were confronted by his former stablemates, The MFTs (Solo Sikoa, Tama Tonga, Tonga Loa and JC Mateo) where Sikoa was jealous of Fatu, who was the one that defeated him twice at both Night of Champions and SummerSlam and Tama Tonga felt no remorse on him only to be taken out by Fatu, who then clashed with Sikoa later that night. However, the MFTs failed to regain the WWE Tag Team Championship from Damian Priest and R-Truth, while Fatu defeated Sikoa in the main event and the MFTs subsequently beat him down though he dispatched Mateo, Loa, and Tonga with a steel chair much to the chagrin of The Usos, who observed Fatu throughout the match.

== Results ==
Night 1 (April 18)
No.	Results	Stipulations	Times
1	The Usos (Jey Uso and Jimmy Uso) and LA Knight defeated The Vision (Logan Paul and Austin Theory) and IShowSpeed by pinfall	Six-man tag team match	7:10
2	Jacob Fatu defeated Drew McIntyre by pinfall	Unsanctioned match	14:10
3	Brie Bella and Paige (with Nikki Bella) defeated The Irresistible Forces (Nia Jax and Lash Legend) (c), Charlotte Flair and Alexa Bliss, and Bayley and Lyra Valkyria by pinfall	Fatal four-way tag team match for the WWE Women's Tag Team Championship	8:35
4	Becky Lynch defeated AJ Lee (c) by pinfall	Singles match for the WWE Women's Intercontinental Championship	8:15
5	Gunther defeated Seth Rollins by technical submission	Singles match	17:50
6	Liv Morgan defeated Stephanie Vaquer (c) by pinfall	Singles match for the Women's World Championship	6:50
7	Cody Rhodes (c) defeated Randy Orton by pinfall	Singles match for the Undisputed WWE Championship	22:45
(c) / – the champion(s) heading into the match

Night 2 (April 19)
No.	Results	Stipulations	Times
1	Oba Femi defeated Brock Lesnar (with Paul Heyman) by pinfall	Singles match	4:45
2	Penta (c) defeated Je'Von Evans, Dragon Lee, JD McDonagh, Rusev, and Rey Mysterio by retrieving the championship belt	Six-pack ladder match for the WWE Intercontinental Championship	15:10
3	Trick Williams (with Lil Yachty) defeated Sami Zayn (c) by pinfall	Singles match for the WWE United States Championship	7:05
4	"The Demon" Finn Bálor defeated Dominik Mysterio by pinfall	Street Fight	10:25
5	Rhea Ripley defeated Jade Cargill (c) by pinfall	Singles match for the WWE Women's Championship	10:10
6	Roman Reigns defeated CM Punk (c) by pinfall	Singles match for the World Heavyweight Championship	33:55
(c) / – the champion(s) heading into the match
