= Elimination Chamber (2026) =

WWE premium live event

- Promotional poster featuring Chicago native CM Punk and his wife AJ Lee
- Promotion: WWE
- Brand(s): Raw; SmackDown
- Date: February 28, 2026
- City: Chicago, Illinois
- Venue: United Center
- Attendance: 19,346

WWE event chronology
| ← Previous; Royal Rumble | Next → NXT Vengeance Day |

Elimination Chamber chronology
| ← Previous; 2025 | Next → — |

The 2026 Elimination Chamber, also promoted as Elimination Chamber: Chicago (known as No Escape: Chicago in Germany), was a professional wrestling premium live event (PLE) produced by WWE, held for wrestlers from the promotion's main roster brands, Raw and SmackDown. It was the 16th Elimination Chamber event and took place on Saturday, February 28, 2026, at United Center in Chicago, Illinois. This was notably WWE's final main roster PLE to air on the WWE Network in any country as it shutdown on April 1 in the last four countries that were still on the platform.

The event centered on the Elimination Chamber match, a type of roofed steel cage that surrounds the ring and ringside area with no disqualifications; the objective is to eliminate all other opponents either by pinfall or submission. The respective men's and women's winners earned a world championship match at WrestleMania, specifically for the respective championships that were not chosen by the Royal Rumble match winners the prior month. As a result of both 2026 Royal Rumble winners choosing Raw's world championships, the respective Elimination Chamber winners earned matches for SmackDown's world championships at WrestleMania 42: the Undisputed WWE Championship and the WWE Women's Championship.

The event comprised four matches. The main event was the men's Elimination Chamber match, which was won by SmackDown's Randy Orton, while in the opening bout, the women's match was won by Raw's Rhea Ripley. In the other two matches, Chicago resident AJ Lee defeated Becky Lynch by submission to win Raw's WWE Women's Intercontinental Championship, while Lee's husband and Chicago native CM Punk defeated Finn Bálor to retain Raw's World Heavyweight Championship. The event also saw the return of Seth Rollins following an injury and the WWE debut of Danhausen, previously known for his time in All Elite Wrestling and Ring of Honor.

== Production ==
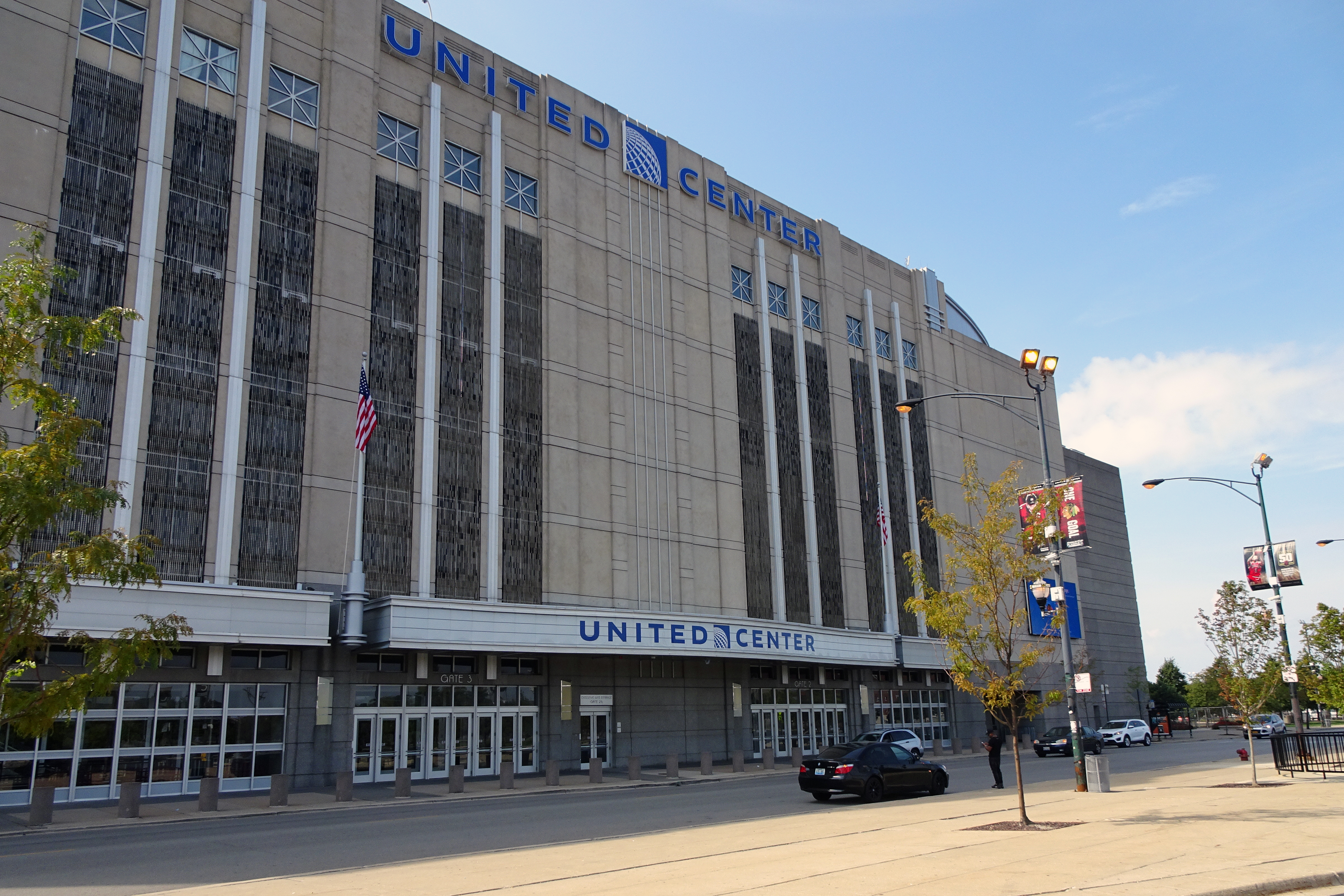
The 16th Elimination Chamber event was held at the United Center in Chicago, Illinois, which was WWE's first televised event at the arena since SummerSlam in 1994.

=== Background ===
Elimination Chamber is a professional wrestling premium live event (PLE) first produced by WWE in 2010. It has been held every year since, except in 2016, generally in February. It was originally broadcast exclusively via pay-per-view (PPV) before it began simulcasting on WWE's livestreaming platforms in 2015. The concept of the event is that two main event matches are contested inside the Elimination Chamber.

On October 14, 2025, Sports Illustrated reported that the 16th Elimination Chamber event was scheduled to take place on Saturday, February 28, 2026, in Chicago, Illinois, featuring wrestlers from the Raw and SmackDown brand divisions. This marked the first Elimination Chamber event to be held in Chicago with it promoted as Elimination Chamber: Chicago, the first to be held in the United States since 2021, and the first in the country with live fans in attendance since the 2020 event due to the COVID-19 pandemic as the 2021 event was held in a bio-secure bubble called the WWE ThunderDome, at the time hosted at Tropicana Field in St. Petersburg, Florida. On November 13, 2025, the venue was revealed as the United Center, marking WWE's first televised event of any kind at the arena since SummerSlam in 1994, as WWE had traditionally held its Chicago area events at the Allstate Arena in Rosemont. The official theme song for the event was "Bodies" by JID, Offset, Bnyx, and Drowning Pool.

The Elimination Chamber match is an elimination-based match contested in a type of large roofed steel cage that surrounds the wrestling ring with an elevated platform around the ring. Within the Chamber are four inner pods, one behind each ring post. The match is contested by six participants. Two wrestlers start the match, while the other four are held within each inner pod with one selected randomly to enter the match at regular intervals, which continues until all four have been released. The objective is to eliminate all other opponents by pinfall or submission, and there are no disqualifications or count-outs. Since 2024, the respective men's and women's winners earn a world championship match at WrestleMania, specifically for the world championships that were not chosen by the prior month's Royal Rumble match winners.

In 2011 and since 2013, the event has been promoted as "No Escape" in Germany as it was feared that the name "Elimination Chamber" may remind people of the gas chambers used during the Holocaust; it was promoted as "No Way Out" in 2010 and 2012.

=== Broadcast outlets ===
The PLE was broadcast on traditional PPV outlets worldwide. It was also available to livestream on ESPN Unlimited in the United States, the WWE Network in Austria, Germany, Italy, and Switzerland, SuperSport in Sub-Saharan Africa, Abema in Japan, and Netflix everywhere else. This marked the first Elimination Chamber to livestream on ESPN's app in the United States, as WWE's contract with Peacock to air main roster PLEs expired at the conclusion of Clash in Paris in August 2025.

=== Storylines ===
The event included four matches that resulted from scripted storylines. Results were predetermined by WWE's writers on the Raw and SmackDown brands, while storylines were produced on WWE's weekly television shows, Monday Night Raw and Friday Night SmackDown.

In speaking with ESPN on January 28, 2026, WWE Chief Content Officer Paul "Triple H" Levesque confirmed that the winners of the men's and women's Elimination Chamber matches would earn a world title match at WrestleMania 42 for the respective championships that the winners of the 2026 Royal Rumble matches did not choose. As a result of both the men's and women's Royal Rumble winners choosing to challenge for Raw's World Heavyweight Championship and Women's World Championship, respectively, this confirmed that the Elimination Chamber winners would challenge for SmackDown's respective world championships: the Undisputed WWE Championship and the WWE Women's Championship.

On February 6, SmackDown General Manager Nick Aldis announced that qualifying matches for Elimination Chamber would begin on that night's SmackDown, with further qualifiers held across subsequent episodes of Raw and SmackDown, contested as triple threat matches. Randy Orton earned the first spot in the men's match by defeating Aleister Black and Solo Sikoa. The second spot was earned by LA Knight on the February 9 episode of Raw, defeating Austin Theory and Penta. Cody Rhodes won the third spot on the February 13 episode of SmackDown, defeating Jacob Fatu and Sami Zayn after interference from Undisputed WWE Champion Drew McIntyre. The fourth spot was earned by Je'Von Evans, who defeated Dominik Mysterio and Gunther on the February 16 episode of Raw. On the February 20 episode of SmackDown, Trick Williams won the fifth spot by defeating Carmelo Hayes and Damian Priest. The final spot was determined on the February 23 episode of Raw which saw Jey Uso defeat Bronson Reed and "The Original" El Grande Americano. Prior to the start of the February 27 episode of SmackDown, Uso was attacked backstage by an unknown assailant and taken to a hospital, ruling him out of Elimination Chamber. Raw's The Vision (Theory, Logan Paul, and Paul Heyman) appeared, with Heyman stating that Paul should take Uso's spot. Later in a backstage segment, Fatu also claimed that he should be in the match due to McIntyre interfering in his qualifier. Aldis then revealed that, after speaking with Raw General Manager Adam Pearce, Fatu would face Paul, with the winner taking Uso's spot. The match was won by Paul after McIntyre interfered once again.

Qualifying matches for the women's Elimination Chamber also began on the February 6 episode of SmackDown, also held as triple threat matches across episodes of Raw and SmackDown. Tiffany Stratton earned the first spot by defeating Chelsea Green and Lash Legend. On the following week's Raw, Rhea Ripley earned the second spot by defeating Ivy Nile and Lyra Valkyria. Alexa Bliss won the third spot by defeating Giulia and Zelina on the February 13 episode of SmackDown. The fourth spot was determined on the February 16 episode of Raw where Asuka defeated Bayley and Nattie. Kiana James won the fifth spot on the February 20 episode of SmackDown, defeating Charlotte Flair and Nia Jax, while the final spot was determined on the February 23 episode of Raw where Raquel Rodriguez defeated Iyo Sky and Kairi Sane.

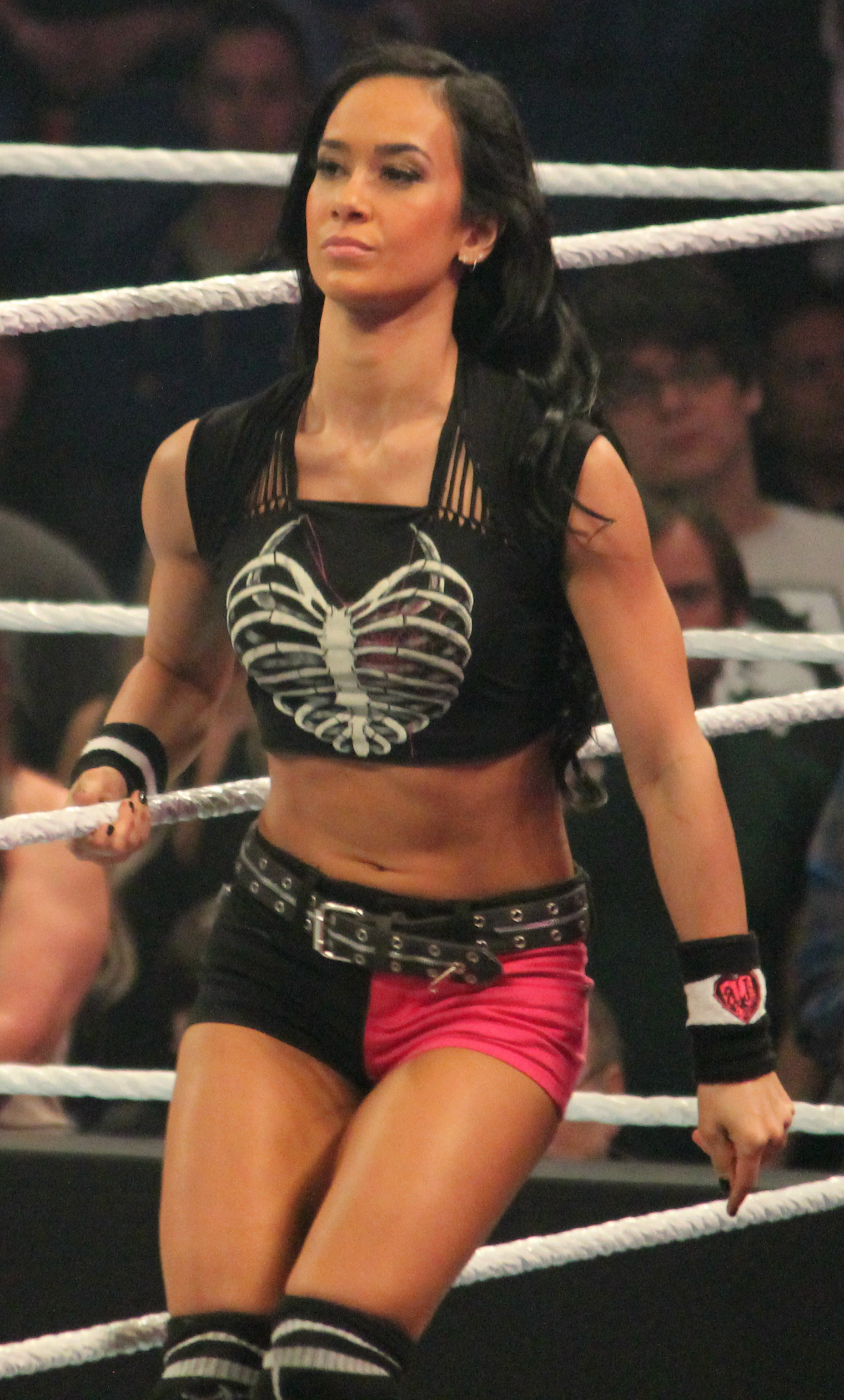
Becky Lynch defended Raw's WWE Women's Intercontinental Championship against Chicago resident AJ Lee.

On the September 5, 2025, episode of SmackDown, AJ Lee returned to WWE for the first time since 2015, aiding her husband CM Punk against Becky Lynch and her husband Seth Rollins. Lee and Punk subsequently defeated Lynch and Rollins in a mixed tag team match at Wrestlepalooza, where Lee forced Lynch to submit. Following a brief hiatus, Lee returned on the November 17 episode of Raw, distracting Lynch to cost her the WWE Women's Intercontinental Championship. At Survivor Series: WarGames that month, both women were part of opposite teams in the Women's WarGames match, where Lee's team won after she forced Lynch to submit once again. Lynch subsequently regained the title on the Raw on Netflix Anniversary Show. On the February 9 episode of Raw, Lee returned from another brief hiatus, much to Lynch's dismay. Lynch asked Lee if she wanted to face her at Elimination Chamber in Chicago where Lee resides. Lee mentioned that since she had already beaten Lynch twice, it would make her the No. 1 contender for the title, which Lynch denied. Lee then teased that she would go back home if she could not fight for the title and refused the match; however, Lynch eventually agreed to defend the title against Lee at the event.

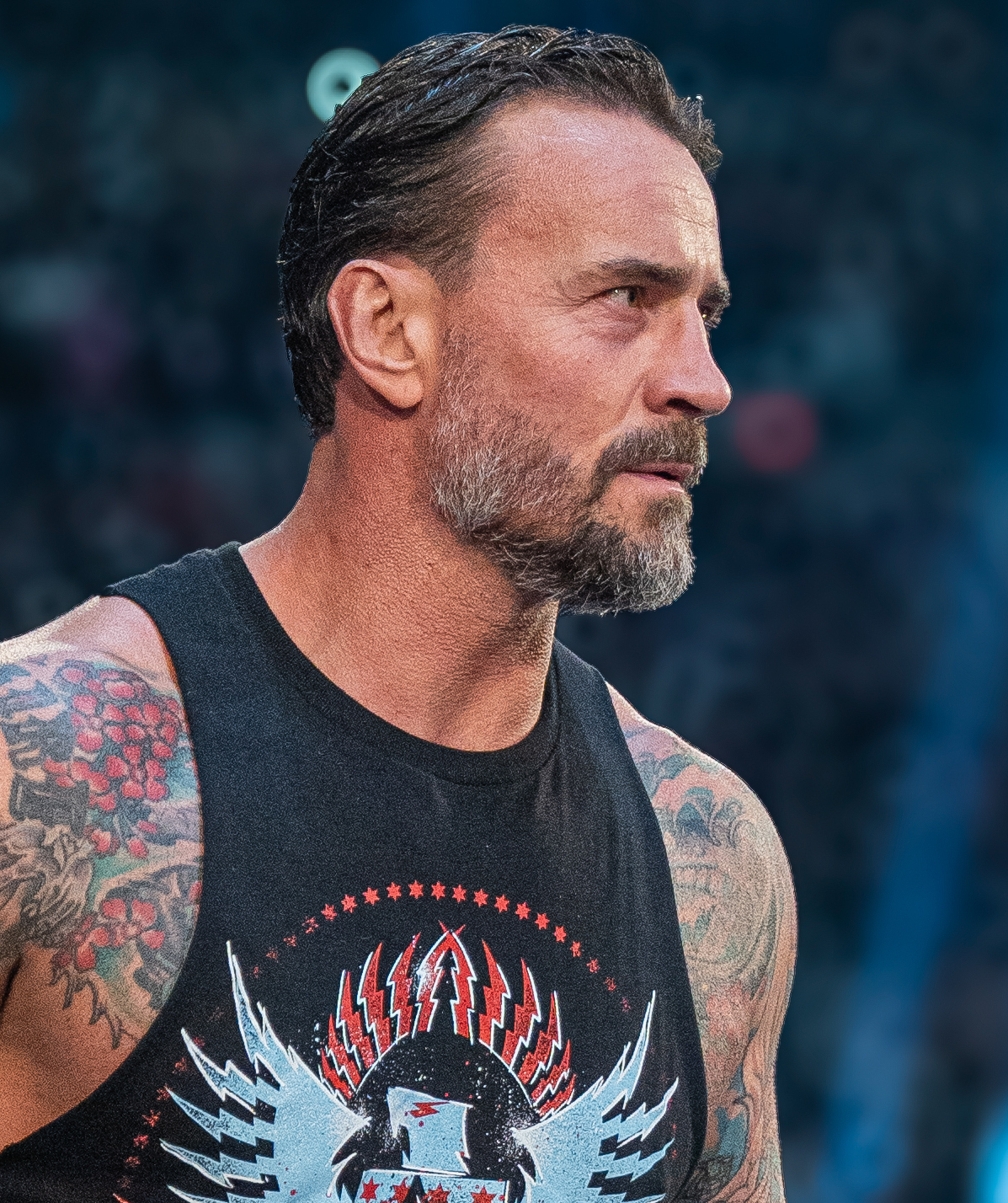
Chicago native CM Punk defended Raw's World Heavyweight Championship against Finn Bálor.

On the January 12 episode of Raw, Judgment Day member Finn Bálor was confronted by stablemate Liv Morgan after she noticed that Bálor had become complacent and had not made any moves to pursue a title. Morgan also claimed that Bálor was not serious about backing his claim of carrying the group on his back and winning a title, which Bálor previously stated as his goal for 2026. This led to Bálor interrupting World Heavyweight Champion CM Punk later that night, who recalled that Punk stated that Bálor was one of the people he wanted to face after winning the title at Saturday Night's Main Event XLI in November 2025. Following an exchange of words, Punk agreed to a title match on that night's episode; however, Bálor wanted the match to happen on the following episode in his home country of Ireland, which Punk agreed. Punk retained the title and showed respect to Bálor afterwards. The following week, Bálor also showed respect to Punk, who stated that Bálor should win the Royal Rumble match to earn a rematch at WrestleMania 42; however, when Bálor declared to Raw General Manager Adam Pearce that he would be entering the match, Pearce stated that all the spots were full, which infuriated Bálor. Later that night, Bálor attacked Punk during his title defense. Two weeks later on Raw, Bálor interrupted Punk's scheduled interview with Michael Cole to challenge Punk for the title at Elimination Chamber in Punk's hometown of Chicago. Pearce denied Bálor's request, not wanting to jeopardize Punk's title defense against Royal Rumble winner Roman Reigns at WrestleMania 42. Punk subsequently appeared and agreed to defend the title against Bálor at the event, and Pearce begrudgingly made the match official.

During the February 16 episode of Raw, a segment occurred where a large wooden crate addressed to WWE appeared, with instructions that the crate must not be opened until February 28, the date of Elimination Chamber. Raw General Manager Adam Pearce sent the crate to SmackDown, where the brand's General Manager Nick Aldis sent it back to Raw, where Pearce in turn stated that he and Aldis would open the crate together at Elimination Chamber.

== Event ==
Other on-screen personnel
| Role: | Name: |
|---|---|
| English commentators | Michael Cole |
| English commentators | Wade Barrett |
| Spanish commentators | Marcelo Rodríguez |
| Spanish commentators | Jerry Soto |
| Ring announcer | Mark Nash |
| Ring announcer | Ray Clay (Punk vs. Bálor, voice only) |
| Referees | Danilo Anfibio |
| Referees | Shawn Bennett |
| Referees | Jessika Carr |
| Referees | Chip Danning |
| Referees | Dan Engler |
| Referees | Chad Patton |
| Referees | Eddie Orengo |
| Referees | Rod Zapata |
| Interviewers | Cathy Kelley |
| Interviewers | Byron Saxton |
| Interviewers | Jackie Redmond |
| Pre-show panel | Joe Tessitore |
| Pre-show panel | Big E |
| Pre-show panel | Peter Rosenberg |

=== Preliminary matches ===
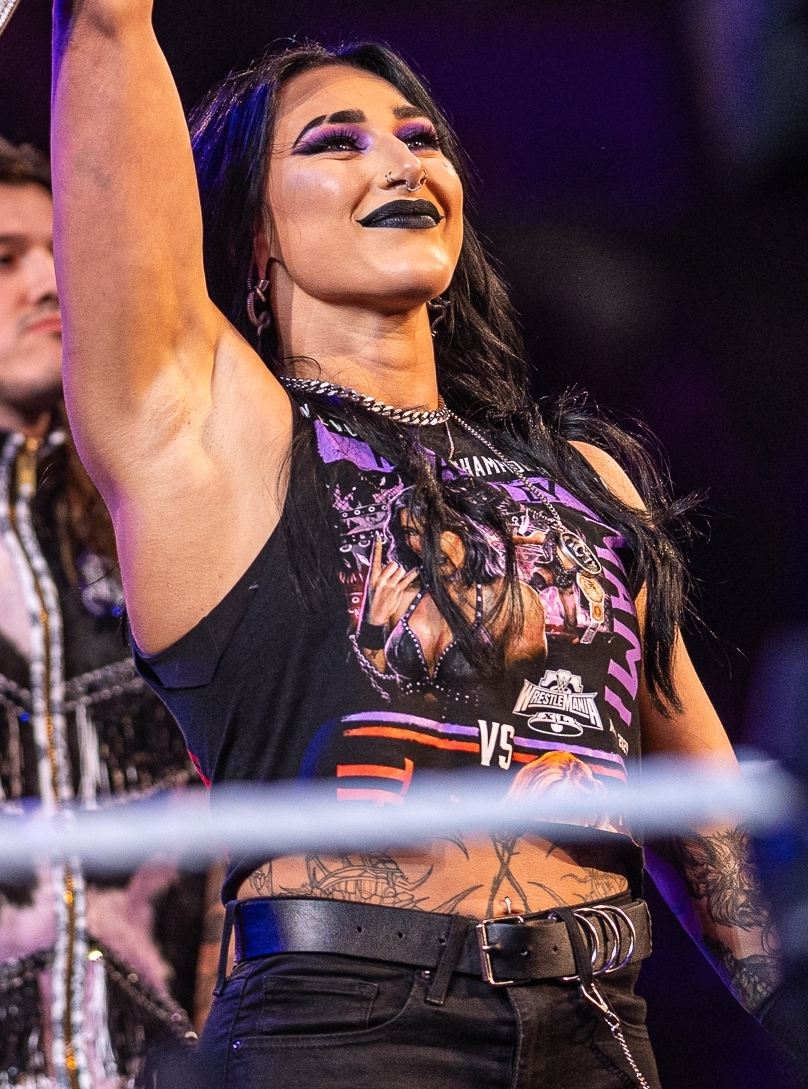
The 2026 Women's Elimination Chamber match winner, Rhea Ripley

The PLE began with the women's Elimination Chamber match. Kiana James and Tiffany Stratton began the match. Stratton attempted a handspring elbow on James who was leaning against a pod, however James moved, which led to Stratton colliding with the pod. Asuka entered third, however, James immediately attacked Asuka inside the pod. Asuka slammed James and Stratton against a pod and Alexa Bliss entered fourth. Rhea Ripley entered fifth and performed the Razor’s Edge on Stratton onto Asuka. Bliss climbed atop a pod and performed the Twisted Bliss onto a Stratton, James, Asuka, and Ripley. As Bliss attempted the Sister Abigail on James, Asuka spat green mist onto Bliss' face, allowing James to eliminate Bliss. Raquel Rodriguez entered last and slammed Ripley into the chamber wall and performed a running powerslam on James through a pod, and performed a Tejana Bomb to Asuka, slamming her onto James. Rodriguez eliminated both James and Asuka simultaneously. Ripley performed a cannonball senton on Rodriguez off the top of a pod. Stratton immediately followed with the Prettiest Moonsault Ever on Rodriguez to eliminate her. Stratton and Ripley were the final two. In the closing moments. After Stratton and Ripley fought for a while, Ripley shoved Stratton off the ropes into a pod and performed a Riptide on Stratton to win the match, earning a WWE Women's Championship match against Jade Cargill at WrestleMania 42.

Next, defending champion Becky Lynch faced AJ Lee for the WWE Women's Intercontinental Championship. Lynch gained control early with a series of strikes and kicks to a grounded Lee. Lee countered an exploder suplex followed with the Shining Wizard for a near-fall. Lynch executed a superplex into an armbar, but Lee turned it into a cradle pin attempt. As the refereed reattached a turnbuckle cover that had been removed earlier, Lynch knocked Lee into the referee before attempting a schoolboy pin, which Lee kicked out of at two. Lynch accidentally roundhouse kicked the referee, rendering her unconscious. Lee put her in the Black Widow, forcing Lynch to tap out without the referee witnessing it. Lynch took advantage of the situation by attacking Lee. After the referee recovered, Lynch hit the Manhandle Slam, but Lee kicked out. Lynch attempted to ram Lee into the exposed turnbuckle but was intercepted by the referee. Lee countered a Manhandle Slam by sending Lynch into the exposed steel. Lee then executed the Black Widow, forcing Lynch to submit to win the title.

In the penultimate match, CM Punk defended the World Heavyweight Championship against Finn Bálor. Punk was introduced by former Chicago Bulls public address announcer Ray Clay as "Sirius" by The Alan Parsons Project played in the background in a tribute to the 1990s-era Bulls. Punk gained the early advantage until Bálor dropped him onto the top rope. Bálor targeted Punk’s ribs. Following a simultaneous clothesline to each other, they traded strikes until Punk connected with a bulldog. Bálor evaded a GTS attempt, but Punk responded with a suicide dive and a flying clothesline for a near-fall. Bálor countered a second GTS attempt into a small package. Punk avoided the Coup de Grâce and delivered a flying elbow drop. Punk's mouth began to bleed. After Bálor countered with a cradle, he executed a slingblade and a running dropkick, but Punk intercepted a second charge with a clothesline and applied the Anaconda Vise. Bálor escaped and connected with the Coup de Grâce for a near-fall. Bálor looked at the stage, teasing a potential interference from The Judgment Day; however, no interference occurred. Punk executed a GTS but was unable to capitalize as Bálor was accidentally sent out of the ring. Bálor regained momentum with a slingblade and a running dropkick that drove Punk through the ringside barricade. Bálor attempted another Coup de Grâce, but Punk countered and put him in the Sharpshooter. After Bálor grabbed to ropes to force Punk to break the hold, Punk hit the GTS to retain the title. Following the match, Bálor and Punk shook hands in a show of respect and the WWE Women's Intercontinental Champion AJ Lee celebrated with Punk in the ring.

After that, Raw General Manager Adam Pearce and SmackDown General Manager Nick Aldis opened the mystery wooden crate on the stage, revealing a wooden coffin inside. As the coffin opened, a group of female dancers in black and white face paint emerged, followed by the debuting Danhausen. Danhausen proceeded to the ringside area, where he gave Michael Cole a jar containing teeth. Shortly after posing in the ring with the dancers, the lights went out. When the lights turned on, Danhausen and the dancers had vanished from the ring.

=== Main event ===
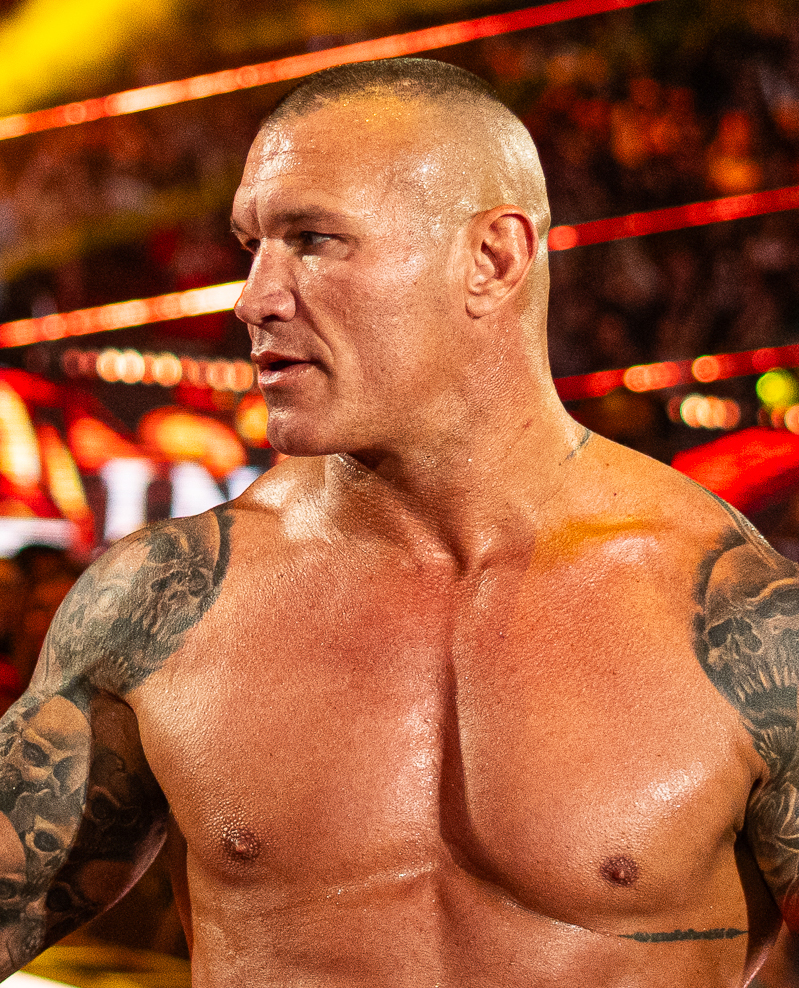
The 2026 Men's Elimination Chamber match winner, Randy Orton

The main event was the men's Elimination Chamber match. Cody Rhodes and Je’Von Evans were the starting participants. Evans gained the early advantage with consecutive hurricanranas, but halted after Rhodes slammed Evans into the chamber wall. Trick Williams entered third, hitting the Book End to both Rhodes and Evans. Logan Paul entered fourth and was immediately targeted by the other participants. He countered Rhodes with the Buckshot Lariat. LA Knight entered fifth, driving Paul into a pod. Knight and Evans threw Paul from the top of a pod onto Rhodes and Williams. Knight then hit Evans with the BFT atop the pod. Randy Orton entered last, delivering his signature draping DDT to Paul and Williams. The first elimination occurred when Evans performed a frog splash off the top of a pod onto Williams; however, Paul immediately intercepted Evans with the Paulverizer to eliminate him. Knight attempted a jump from the middle rope to the rope into a diving elbow drop on Orton but he slipped on the top rope. He recovered by hitting a jumping elbow drop on Orton. Paul struck Knight with a low blow to eliminate him. Rhodes hit Williams with the Cross Rhodes, but Paul threw Rhodes aside and pinned Williams for his third elimination of the match. A masked individual attempted to scale the cage but was detained by security and unmasked by Adam Pearce, revealing an unknown man. A second masked man entered the chamber through the open door and attacked Paul with the curb stomp, allowing Rhodes to eliminate Paul. The assailant unmasked himself, revealing a returning Seth Rollins, The Vision's former leader who had been betrayed and excommunicated by the group. The final two participants were Rhodes and Orton. Undisputed WWE Champion Drew McIntyre entered the chamber, striking Rhodes with the title. Orton intervened with the RKO to McIntyre. Orton encouraged Rhodes to hit the Cross Rhodes on McIntyre; as Rhodes complied, Orton immediately struck Rhodes with the RKO to secure the victory and an Undisputed WWE Championship match at WrestleMania 42.

== Reception ==
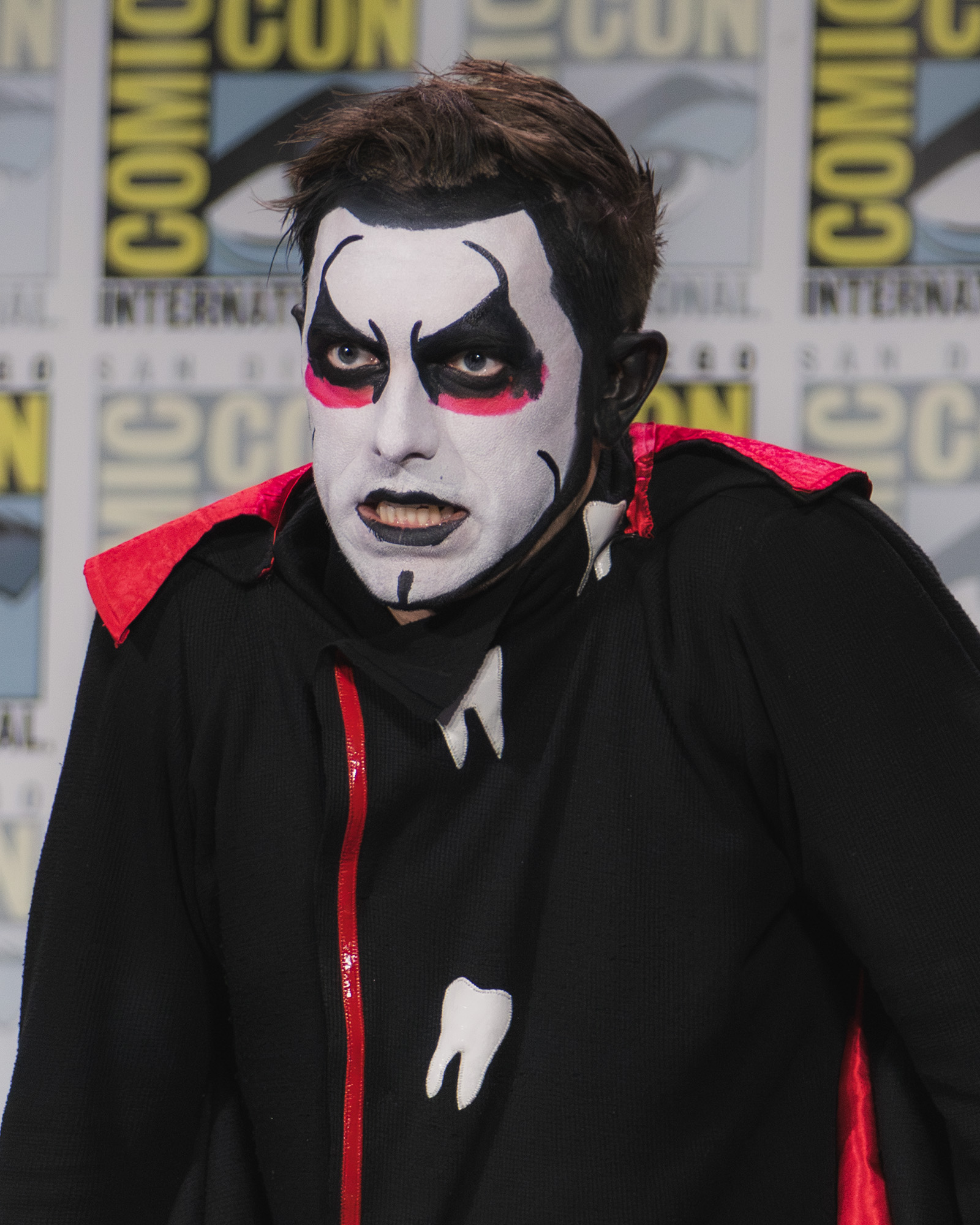
Danhausen's WWE debut during the show polarized critics, and was panned by fans online.

Brent Brookhouse of CBS Sports awarded the show generally positive grades while noting several technical inconsistencies. Brookhouse gave the women's Elimination Chamber match a B+. He praised the decision to have Rhea Ripley win, noting it established a "fresh matchup" for WrestleMania 42 but that the middle portion of the match was too formulaic. The WWE Women's Intercontinental Championship match received a B−. Brookhouse criticized the bout for lacking "hard-hitting" elements and pointed out several "missed" spots involving a steel chair. While he noted the effective storytelling regarding Becky Lynch's frustration and the referee's incapacitation, he ultimately labeled the match "fairly forgettable". The World Heavyweight Championship match was graded a B. He described the contest as a "perfectly serviceable match" with a "predictable winner", though he noted the chemistry was slightly lower than their previous encounter on Raw. The men's Elimination Chamber match also received a B. Brookhouse characterized the bout as "overbooked" due to the significant interference from Seth Rollins and Drew McIntyre; however, he called Randy Orton's victory a "nice surprise".

Anthony Sulla-Heffinger of Yahoo! Sports was more favorable toward the undercard than the main event. He awarded the Women's Elimination Chamber match an A−, praising it as a "fast-paced, hard-hitting opener". He highlighted Ripley's "cannonball" off the pod as the match's standout moment and noted that Kiana James successfully established herself as a viable upper mid-card talent. The Women's Intercontinental Championship match also received an A−. He lauded the "crisp and clean" in-ring action and the storytelling involving referee Jessika Carr. He argued that the "perfectly executed" false finish following a DDT onto a chair protected Lynch in defeat, while the result successfully setup a potential rematch with a special stipulation at WrestleMania 42. The World Heavyweight Championship match earned an A− as well. While he acknowledged the "uphill battle" of the match's predictable outcome, he found the post-match show of respect between Bálor and Punk to be a compelling narrative pivot, suggesting it served as a catalyst for Bálor to eventually break away from The Judgment Day. He gave the men's Elimination Chamber match a C−. While he cited the reveal of Seth Rollins as the masked assailant as the "best spot" of the match, he was dissatisfied with the overall execution compared to the earlier bouts.

Dave Meltzer of the Wrestling Observer Newsletter gave the women's Elimination Chamber match 3.5 stars, the Women's Intercontinental Championship match 3 stars, the World Heavyweight Championship match 4.25 stars, and the men's Elimination Chamber match 4 stars in a 5-star rating system.

The reveal of Danhausen had a mixed reaction from the fans. While he was initially cheered when he appeared, other people booed him at the end of his segment. Dave Meltzer compared his debut with the Gobbledy Gooker's, one of the most infamous wrestling debuts. Online reception to Danhausen's debut was almost entirely negative, though some members of the online community and several wrestlers defended him.

== Aftermath ==
The 2026 Elimination Chamber was the last PLE livestream on the WWE Network in any country as the four remaining countries that still had the service due to pre-existing contracts merged under Netflix on April 1. This would also be the final Elimination Chamber event to air on Abema in Japan, which merged under Netflix on October 1.

=== Raw ===
The following episode of Raw opened with The Vision (Paul Heyman, Logan Paul, and Austin Theory) promising to take out Seth Rollins for interfering and costing Paul in the men's Elimination Chamber match. Raw General Manager, Adam Pearce, came out and stated that Rollins was not medically cleared to compete and requested The Vision to leave the ring. A masked individual then appeared at ringside to taunt The Vision, however, security chased after the individual. Two more masked individuals then came out which led to Theory, and Paul chasing after them and leaving Heyman alone in the ring. A fourth masked individual then appeared, revealing himself as Rollins. Rollins attacked Heyman with a chair and performed a Stomp on Heyman. Rollins then left the ring and into the crowd while medical personnel tended to Heyman in the ring. In a backstage segment, LA Knight then took Heyman away in an ambulance.

Also on Raw, new WWE Women's Intercontinental Champion AJ Lee cut a promo where she promised to be a fighting champion and stated that if anyone in the women's division believe themselves as champion material, Lee would be defending the title against anyone. Following Lee's successful title defense against Bayley on the March 16 episode, Becky Lynch returned and attacked Lee. This set up a title rematch between them at WrestleMania 42.

=== SmackDown ===
During the Elimination Chamber post-show, SmackDown General Manager Nick Aldis announced that Cody Rhodes would challenge Drew McIntyre for the Undisputed WWE Championship on the March 6 episode of SmackDown. The match was sanctioned following McIntyre's interference in the men's Elimination Chamber match, where he attacked Rhodes with the title, and also following the Royal Rumble, where he caused Rhodes to be eliminated from the Royal Rumble match as well as McIntyre's failed attempt to cost Rhodes his Elimination Chamber qualifying match. Rhodes went on to defeat McIntyre after interference from Jacob Fatu (who also feud with McIntyre for months) to win the title for a third time, setting up an Undisputed WWE Championship match between Rhodes and Randy Orton at WrestleMania 42.

Also on SmackDown, women's Elimination Chamber match winner Rhea Ripley confronted WWE Women's Champion Jade Cargill. The two traded blows regarding their advantages and both promised to leave WrestleMania 42 as champion.

== Results ==
| No. | Results | Stipulations | Times |
|---|---|---|---|
| 1 | Rhea Ripley defeated Tiffany Stratton, Alexa Bliss, Asuka, Kiana James, and Raquel Rodriguez | Elimination Chamber match for a WWE Women's Championship match at WrestleMania 42 | 24:00 |
| 2 | AJ Lee defeated Becky Lynch (c) by submission | Singles match for the WWE Women's Intercontinental Championship | 15:40 |
| 3 | CM Punk (c) defeated Finn Bálor by pinfall | Singles match for the World Heavyweight Championship | 20:25 |
| 4 | Randy Orton defeated LA Knight, Cody Rhodes, Je'Von Evans, Trick Williams, and Logan Paul (with Austin Theory and Paul Heyman) | Elimination Chamber match for an Undisputed WWE Championship match at WrestleMania 42 | 25:20 |
(c) / – the champion(s) heading into the match

=== Women's Elimination Chamber match ===
| Eliminated | Wrestler | Entered | Eliminated by | Method | Time |
|---|---|---|---|---|---|
| 1 | Alexa Bliss | 4 | Kiana James | Pinfall | 13:10 |
| 2 | Kiana James | 1 | Raquel Rodriguez | Pinfall | 16:15 |
| 3 | Asuka | 3 | Raquel Rodriguez | Pinfall | 16:15 |
| 4 | Raquel Rodriguez | 6 | Tiffany Stratton | Pinfall | 20:30 |
| 5 | Tiffany Stratton | 2 | Rhea Ripley | Pinfall | 24:00 |
| Winner | Rhea Ripley | 5 | — | | 24:00 |

=== Men's Elimination Chamber match ===
| Eliminated | Wrestler | Entered | Eliminated by | Method | Time |
|---|---|---|---|---|---|
| 1 | Je'Von Evans | 1 | Logan Paul | Pinfall | 16:00 |
| 2 | LA Knight | 5 | Logan Paul | Pinfall | 18:35 |
| 3 | Trick Williams | 3 | Logan Paul | Pinfall | 20:25 |
| 4 | Logan Paul | 4 | Cody Rhodes | Pinfall | 23:00 |
| 5 | Cody Rhodes | 2 | Randy Orton | Pinfall | 25:20 |
| Winner | Randy Orton | 6 | — | | 25:20 |

== See also ==
- List of WWE pay-per-view and livestreaming supercards
- Sports in Chicago
