= Ray Clay =

American public address announcer

Ray Clay is an American public address announcer best known for his work for the Chicago Bulls organization in the 1990s.

== Chicago Bulls ==
A native of Berwyn, Illinois, Clay began announcing basketball games at the University of Illinois at Chicago in 1980. He was hired by the Bulls in 1990 and worked with them for 12 ½ seasons, during which the team won six NBA Championships. With the rising popularity of the team, many traditions Clay adopted from his predecessor, Tommy Edwards, became known worldwide, including the opening address to the fans (“And now, the starting lineup for YOUR CHICAGO BULLS!”) the distinctive player introductions (e.g., “From North Carolina, at guard, 6’6", Michael Jordan!”), and the use of The Alan Parsons Project instrumental "Sirius" as background music for player introductions.

Clay’s fame during the height of the Bulls success led to a minor acting career. For example, he guest starred in a 1993 episode of the sitcom Married... with Children and had roles in the films Blink and He Got Game. In addition, he lent his vocal talents to several basketball video games and read the "Top Ten" on the Late Show with David Letterman in 1998.

== 2002 dismissal ==
In January 2002, Michael Jordan was scheduled to return to the United Center for the first time since leaving the Bulls in 1998. Jordan was then playing for the Washington Wizards, and Chicago Sun-Times columnist Jay Mariotti asked Clay how he was going to introduce the ex-Bull. Clay explained that he wanted to deliver his familiar introduction for Jordan, but team management had ordered him to introduce Jordan as he would any other opposing player. "When I gave my opinion, that was Ray Clay, the fan, talking. But when you work for an organization, you are bound by rules and how they want you to talk and act", he said.

Clay was then fired in May of that year. The Bulls gave no official reason for Clay's dismissal, but Clay speculated he was fired because of his disagreement with team management over Jordan's introduction. "When you put two and two together, that's all it could be. I can’t think of anything else I ever did wrong", he told Mariotti. Despite this, Clay has filled in for successor Tommy Edwards on some occasions, most recently in 2018.

In April 2003, Clay accepted an invitation to introduce Jordan at the First Union Center in Philadelphia, where Jordan played his last game in the NBA.

== Chicago Sky ==
In 2006, Clay was hired to become an announcer for the Chicago Sky of the WNBA. At the time of his hiring, the Sky played their home games at UIC, where Clay was working as director of campus recreation. Clay retired from announcing Chicago Sky games in 2019 after 12 years with the team.

== WWE appearance ==
At the 2026 edition of WWE's Elimination Chamber event, held at the Bulls' home of United Center, Clay introduced Chicago native CM Punk for his World Heavyweight Championship defense against Finn Bálor. The introduction also used "Sirius" as background music.
