= WrestleMania 41 =

2025 WWE premium live event

- Promotional poster featuring Cody Rhodes and John Cena
- Promotion: WWE
- Brands: Raw; SmackDown
- Date: April 19–20, 2025
- City: Paradise, Nevada
- Venue: Allegiant Stadium
- Attendance: Night 1: 58,538; Night 2: 60,103; Combined: 118,641 (Note: WWE announced an attendance of 61,467 (Night 1) and 63,226 (Night 2) — 124,693 combined.)

WWE event chronology
← Previous; Stand & Deliver	Next → Backlash

WrestleMania chronology
← Previous; XL	Next → 42

WrestleMania 41, also promoted as WrestleMania Vegas, was a 2025 two-part professional wrestling premium live event (PLE) produced by WWE, held for wrestlers from the promotion's main roster brands, Raw and SmackDown. It was the 41st annual WrestleMania and took place as a two-night event during Easter weekend on Saturday, April 19, and Sunday, April 20, 2025, at Allegiant Stadium in Paradise, Nevada. This was the second WrestleMania to take place in the Las Vegas Valley, after WrestleMania IX in 1993 at Caesars Palace.

The card comprised a total of 14 matches, evenly divided between each night. In the main event of Night 1, which was a cross-promotional match, Raw's Seth Rollins defeated Raw's CM Punk and SmackDown's Roman Reigns in a triple threat match, which saw Paul Heyman turn on both Punk and Reigns to side with Rollins. In other prominent matches, Tiffany Stratton defeated Charlotte Flair to retain SmackDown's WWE Women's Championship, and in the opening bout, Jey Uso defeated Gunther by submission to win Raw's World Heavyweight Championship.

In the main event of Night 2, John Cena defeated Cody Rhodes to win SmackDown's Undisputed WWE Championship, marking his record 14th WWE Championship and a record 17th WWE world championship overall. In other prominent matches, Dominik Mysterio defeated Finn Bálor, Penta, and defending champion Bron Breakker to win Raw's WWE Intercontinental Championship in a fatal four-way match by pinning Bálor, and Iyo Sky defeated Bianca Belair and Rhea Ripley in a triple threat match to retain Raw's Women's World Championship.

The event received mixed-to-positive reviews, with the Night 1 main event and the Women's World Championship match being singled out for acclaim, while the World Heavyweight Championship match, the Sin City Street Fight, the Intercontinental Championship match, AJ Styles vs. Logan Paul, and SmackDown's WWE United States Championship match also garnered positive reviews. Criticism was directed mainly towards Raw's World Tag Team Championship match, the WWE Women's Championship match, and the Night 2 main event, with its finish in particular being described as "anti-climactic" by many fans and critics.

This was the first WrestleMania to be held during Easter weekend, making it the latest calendar date for the event. It was also the first WrestleMania to livestream on Netflix in most international markets as the platform began a 10-year rights deal with WWE in January 2025, as well as the last WrestleMania to livestream on Peacock in the United States as ESPN's direct-to-consumer streaming service began a five-year rights deal with WWE, starting in September 2025. This would also be the last WrestleMania on the WWE Network in any country, as the last few countries that were still on the service due to pre-existing contracts merged under Netflix on April 1, 2026, and the final WrestleMania to air on Disney+ in the Philippines as it too merged under Netflix on January 1, 2026.

== Production ==
=== Background ===
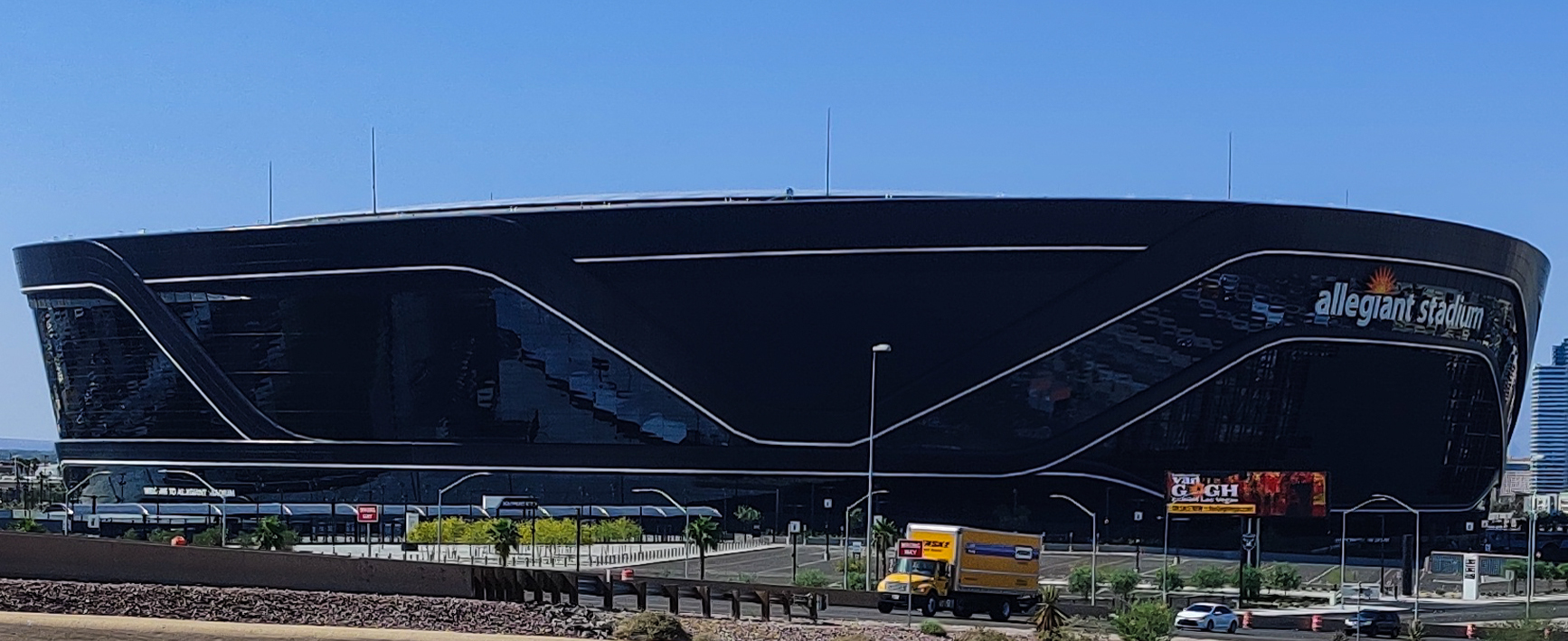
The 41st annual WrestleMania was held at Allegiant Stadium in Paradise, Nevada near the Las Vegas Strip.

WrestleMania is WWE's flagship professional wrestling premium live event (PLE), having first been held in 1985. It was the company's first pay-per-view (PPV) produced and was also WWE's first major event available via livestreaming when the company launched the WWE Network in February 2014. It is the longest-running professional wrestling event in history and is held annually between mid-March to mid-April. It was the first of WWE's original four PPVs, including Royal Rumble, SummerSlam, and Survivor Series, referred to as the "Big Four", and as of August 2021, it is considered one of the "Big Five", along with Money in the Bank. WrestleMania was ranked the sixth most valuable sports brand in the world by Forbes in 2019, and has been described as the Super Bowl of sports entertainment. Much like the Super Bowl, cities bid for the right to host the year's edition of WrestleMania.

On May 4, 2024, during NBC's pre-race coverage for the 150th Kentucky Derby, it was announced that Allegiant Stadium in the Las Vegas district of Paradise, Nevada would host WrestleMania 41 on Saturday, April 19, and Sunday, April 20, 2025, marking the first WrestleMania to be held during Easter weekend and subsequently the latest calendar date for the event. This was subsequently the second WWE event to be held at the venue after SummerSlam in 2021. This was also the second WrestleMania held in the Las Vegas area, after WrestleMania IX in 1993 at Caesars Palace, with the event in turn marketed as "WrestleMania Vegas". Two-day combo tickets went on sale on October 25, 2024, while single day tickets went on sale from January 24, 2025. One of the official theme songs for the event was "Timeless" by The Weeknd and Playboi Carti, marking a record sixth consecutive year that a Weeknd track had served as a theme song for a WrestleMania. "Fein" by Travis Scott featuring Playboi Carti was also an official theme song.

Minneapolis, Minnesota was also a finalist to host the event at U.S. Bank Stadium. Its proponents said they had been informed that the decision to place the event in the Las Vegas area was driven by a "change in direction by new ownership", following the 2023 merger of WWE and Las Vegas-based Ultimate Fighting Championship (UFC) as TKO Group Holdings, controlled by UFC's previous sole owner Endeavor. U.S. Bank Stadium would in turn get SummerSlam for 2026.

=== Broadcast outlets ===
Both nights of WrestleMania 41 were broadcast on traditional PPV outlets worldwide. They were also available to livestream on Peacock in the United States, SuperSport in Sub-Saharan Africa, Disney+ in the Philippines, Abema in Japan, Rush Prime in the Caribbean, IB Sports in South Korea, Netflix in most other international markets, and the WWE Network in a select few countries that had not yet transferred to Netflix due to pre-existing contracts. This marked the first WrestleMania to livestream on Netflix following the WWE Network's merger under the service in January 2025 in those areas.

=== Other WrestleMania week events ===
As part of the WrestleMania festivities, WWE held a number of events throughout the week. The week kicked off with a special "WrestleMania Edition" of Monday Night Raw, held at the Golden 1 Center in Sacramento, California. On April 17, Netflix presented WaleMania X from the Brooklyn Bowl. The night before WrestleMania 41 on April 18, WWE kicked off WrestleMania Weekend with a special "WrestleMania Edition" of Friday Night SmackDown, which featured the annual André the Giant Memorial Battle Royal, won by Carmelo Hayes. After SmackDown, the 2025 WWE Hall of Fame induction ceremony commenced. During the afternoon of WrestleMania Saturday, WWE's NXT brand held its annual WrestleMania Weekend event, Stand & Deliver. After WrestleMania Saturday's conclusion, WWE Hall of Famer The Undertaker hosted his 1deadMAN show. After WrestleMania Sunday's conclusion, there was a comedy event, "The Roast of WrestleMania Featuring Tony Hinchcliffe & Friends". On April 21 the Raw after WrestleMania took place, with all WrestleMania week events concluding with NXT on April 22. SmackDown, Stand & Deliver, and Raw were held live at the nearby T-Mobile Arena, while the Hall of Fame ceremony, 1deadMAN Show, Roast of WrestleMania, and NXT were held live at the nearby Fontainebleau Las Vegas in the BleauLive Theater.

In partnership with Fanatics Events, WWE also hosted the second annual WWE World at WrestleMania, a five-day fan convention held at the Las Vegas Convention Center. The event began on Thursday, April 17 and ran through Monday, April 21. It included interview panel sessions with WWE wrestlers, live podcast recordings, meet-and-greets with wrestlers, and a large merchandise store with various memorabilia honoring WrestleMania's 41-year history. WWE World also hosted the Slammy Awards during the afternoon of April 20. Also throughout April, WWE partnered with Clash of Clans with various superstars featured in the game, and included an "enhanced match sponsorship" at WrestleMania 41. On Friday, April 18 and Monday, April 21, WWE commentator Pat McAfee hosted his eponymous ESPN afternoon talk show live from WWE World.

Also as part of WrestleMania 41 week, WWE partnered with independent wrestling promotions Game Changer Wrestling (GCW) and Future Stars of Wrestling (FSW) to co-promote the opening rounds of the WWE ID Championship and WWE Women's ID Championship tournaments at the Palms Casino Resort and FSW Arena in Las Vegas.

=== Celebrity involvement ===
Various celebrities from outside of wrestling participated in various capacities. UFC President Dana White narrated the cold open for Night 1. Country singer Jelly Roll performed "God Bless America" to kick off Night 1. In a cross-promotion for the 2025 video game Fatal Fury: City of the Wolves, disc jockey Salvatore Ganacci opened for Jey Uso's entrance, which also had involvement from the Las Vegas Raiderettes cheerleading squad. Meteorologist Jim Cantore from The Weather Channel was part of Jade Cargill's entrance. Living Colour played their song "Cult of Personality" for CM Punk's entrance in the main event of Night 1. Pop singer Ava Max performed "The Star-Spangled Banner" to kick off Night 2. Slayer guitarist Kerry King played for Damian Priest's entrance. Travis Scott also got involved in the Night 2 main event match.

=== Storylines ===
The event included a total of 14 matches, split evenly between both nights, that resulted from scripted storylines. Results were predetermined by WWE's writers on the Raw and SmackDown brands, while storylines were produced on WWE's weekly television shows, Monday Night Raw and Friday Night SmackDown.

==== Main event matches ====
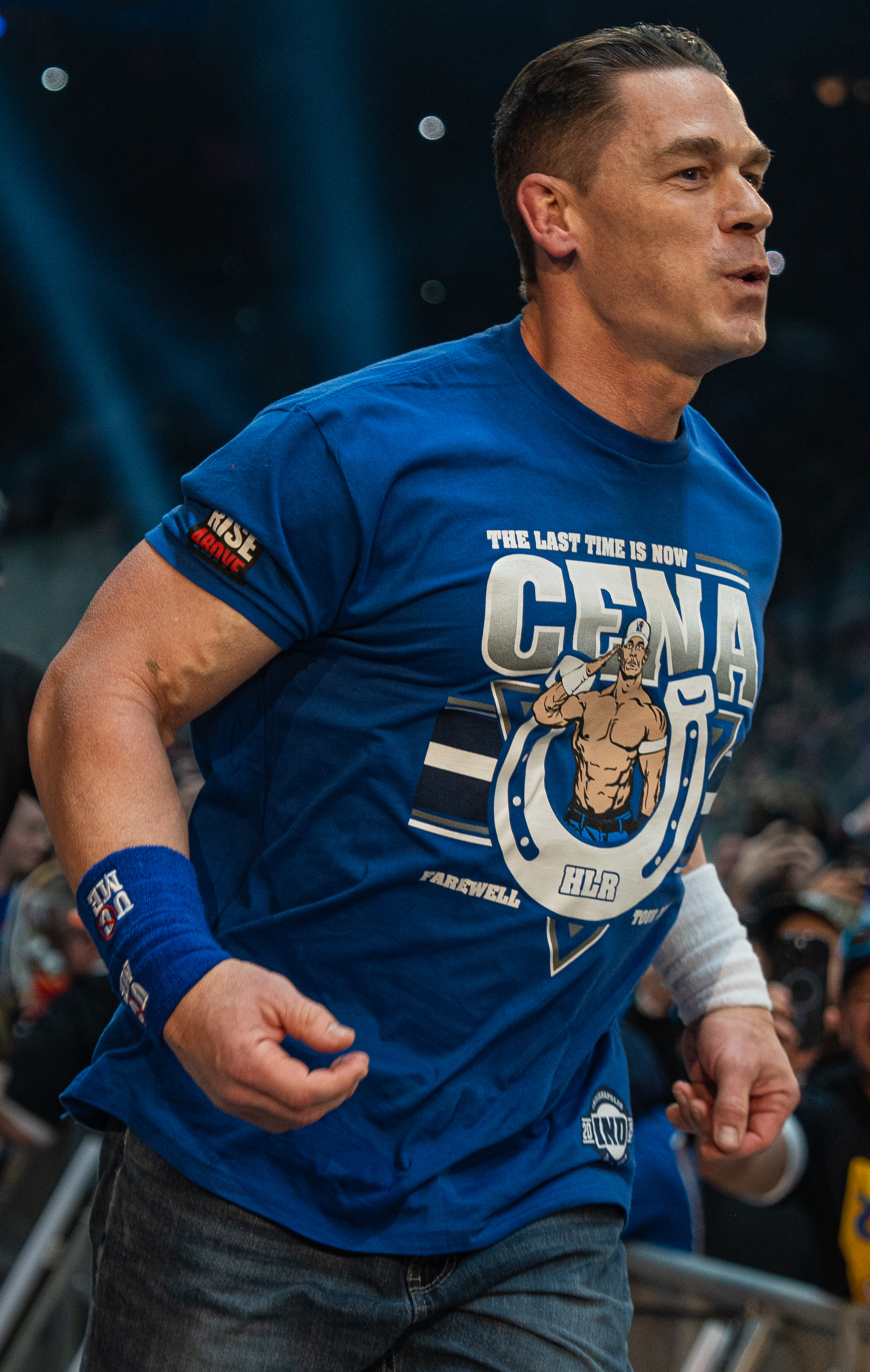
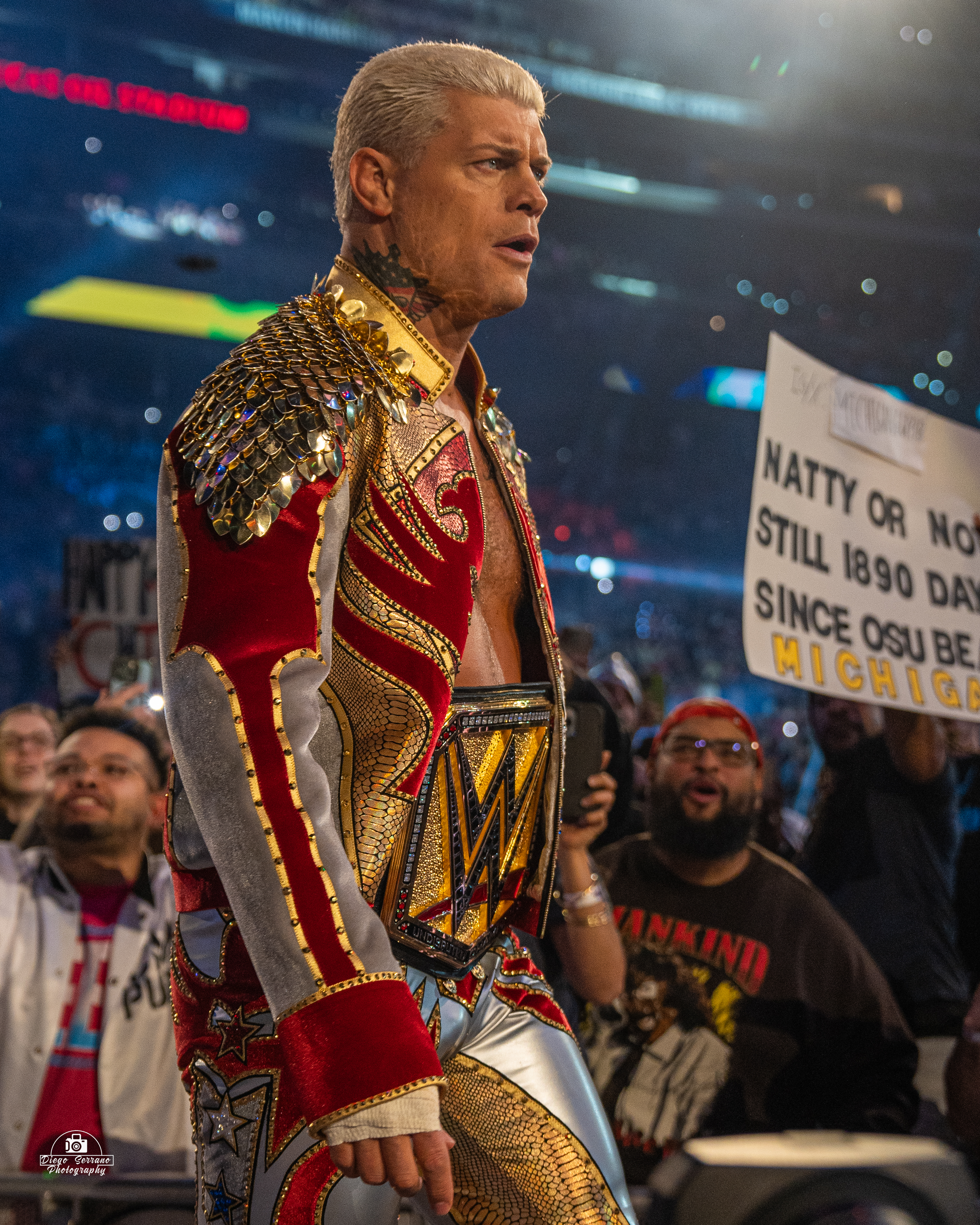
In his final WrestleMania match, John Cena challenged Cody Rhodes for SmackDown's Undisputed WWE Championship in the main event of Night 2 in an attempt to become a record 17-time WWE world champion. (Note: Cena was tied with Ric Flair for the most overall world championship reigns (16) as recognized by WWE.)

At Money in the Bank in 2024, John Cena revealed that he would retire from professional wrestling at the end of 2025, and also announced that he would compete at WrestleMania 41. After losing the men's Royal Rumble match at the Royal Rumble event in February, Cena entered himself into the men's Elimination Chamber match at the Elimination Chamber event for one last chance to challenge for a world championship at WrestleMania 41, citing that main-eventing his last WrestleMania and becoming a record 17-time WWE world champion would be "best for business". Also around this time, TKO board member Dwayne "The Rock" Johnson tried to bribe SmackDown's reigning Undisputed WWE Champion Cody Rhodes to be his corporate champion, claiming that they had become friends following their clash at the prior year's WrestleMania XL and that he could elevate Rhodes's career. At Elimination Chamber, Cena won the eponymous match, earning a title match against Rhodes at WrestleMania. Following the match, Rhodes appeared to congratulate Cena followed by The Rock to get Rhodes's answer to his offer. Rhodes declined and Cena embraced Rhodes; however, Cena then viciously attacked Rhodes, siding with Rock, turning heel for the first time since 2003. In the weeks following, Cena berated the audience, claiming they had mistreated him for the last 20+ years, and that he turned on Rhodes because he was disgusted by him. Rhodes chastised Cena and told him he wanted to face the real Cena at WrestleMania 41, not this "whiny" version. Cena also claimed that after he won the title, he would take it with him when he retired. It was later confirmed that the match would be the main event on Night 2.

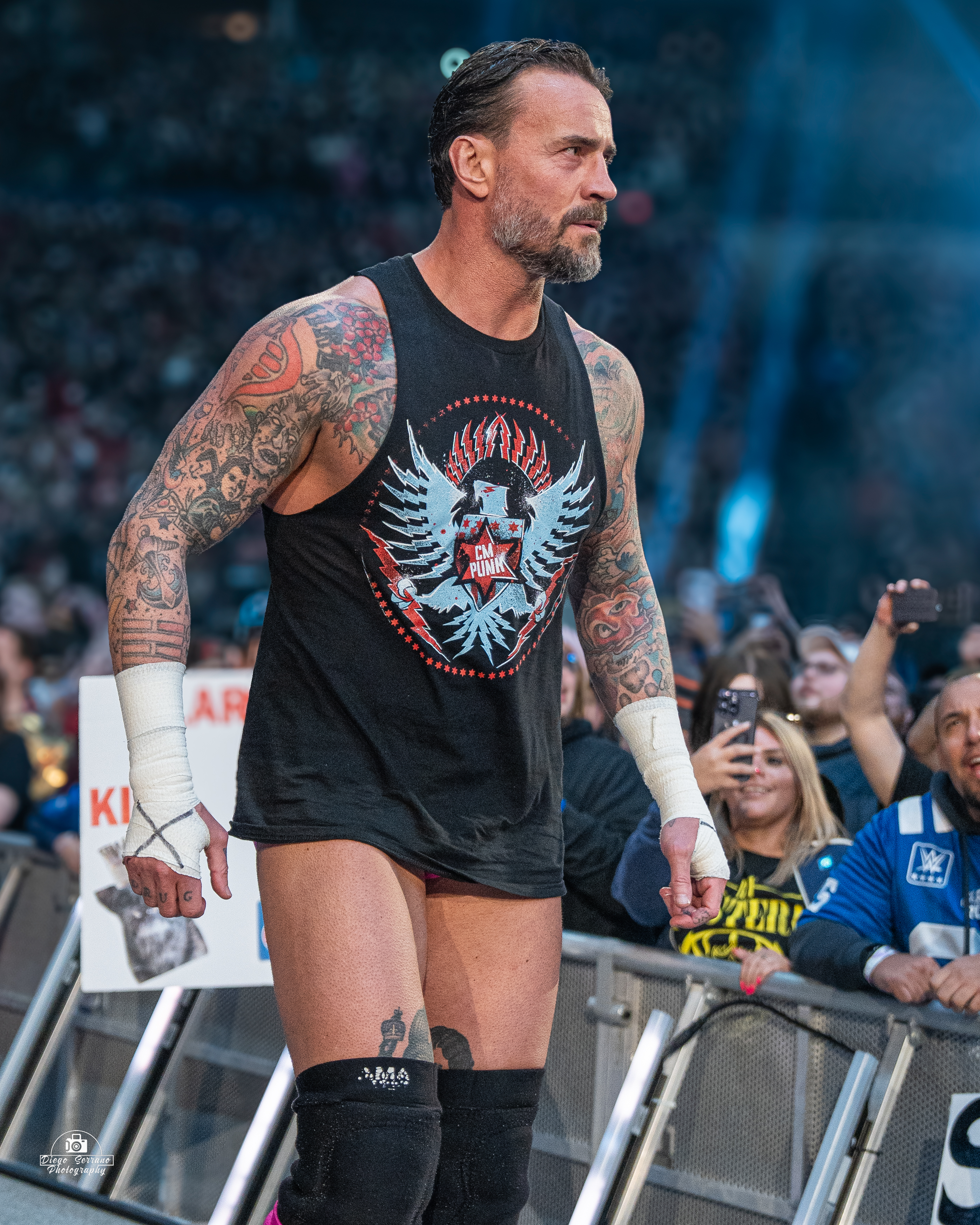
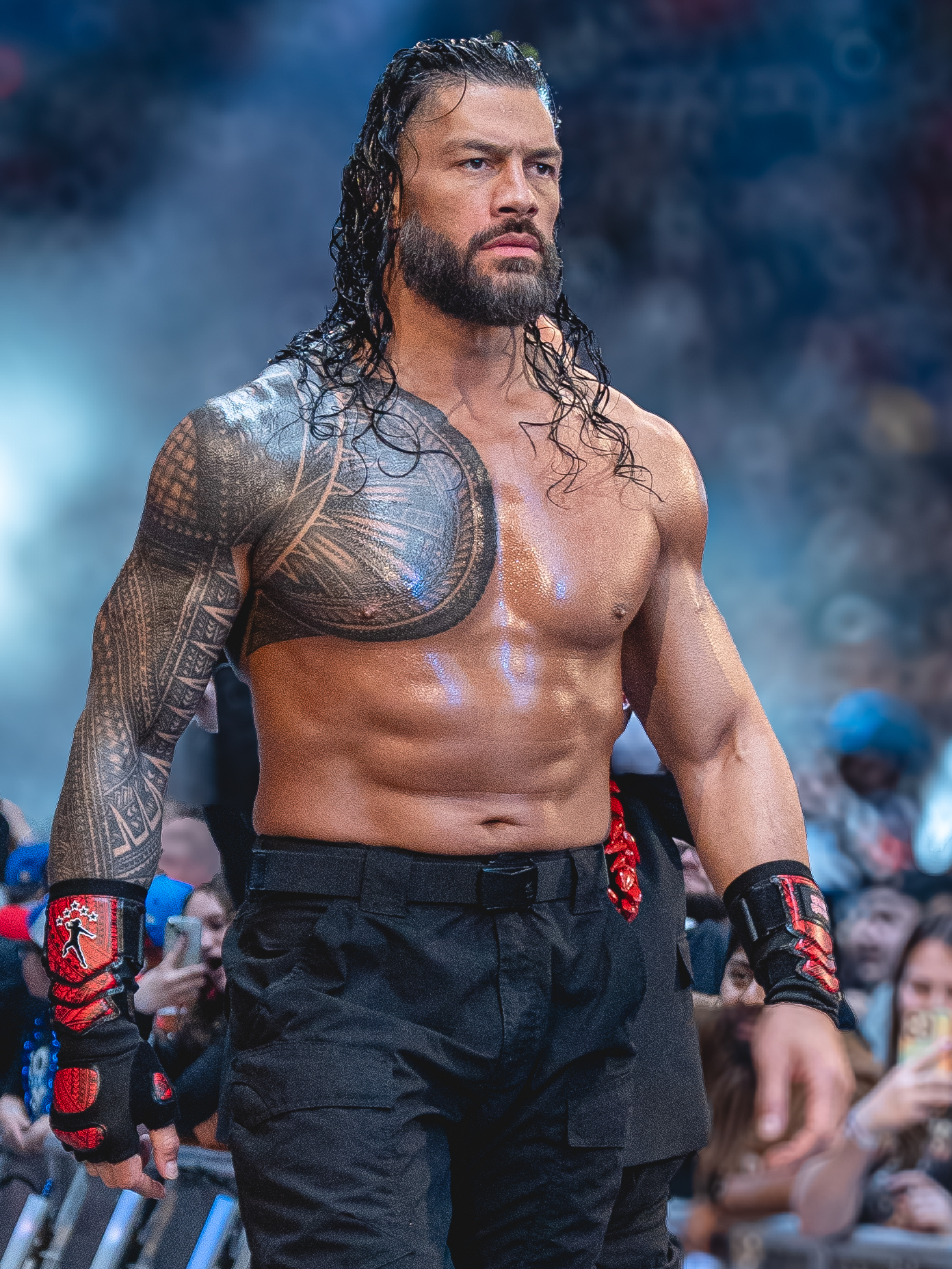
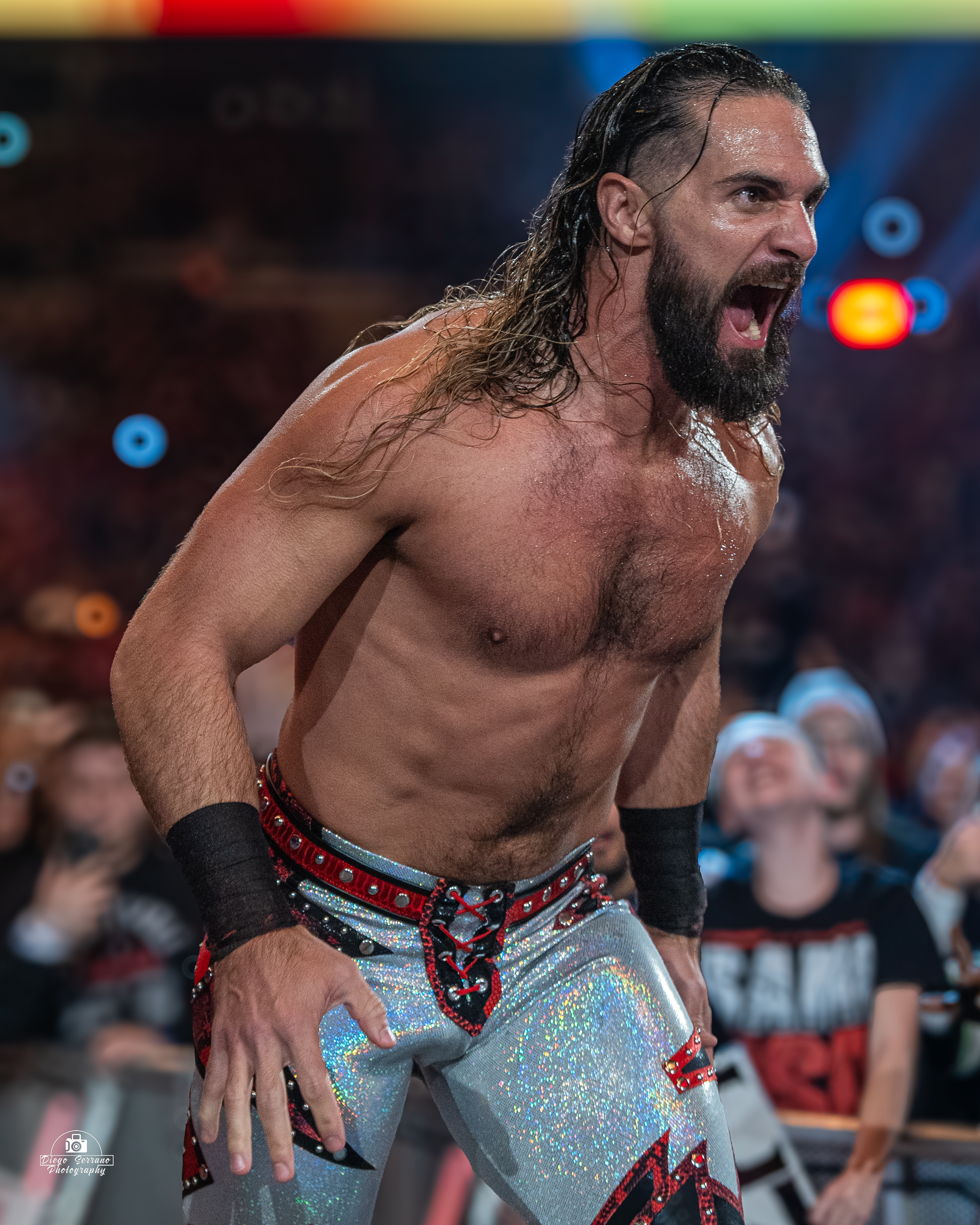
In his first WrestleMania main event, CM Punk faced Roman Reigns and Seth Rollins in a triple threat match on Night 1. This match was Reigns's record 10th WrestleMania main event and Rollins's third. (Note: This includes WrestleMania 31.)

Upon CM Punk's return to WWE at Survivor Series: WarGames in November 2023, he immediately became a target of Seth Rollins. Unable to compete for several months after tearing his triceps at the 2024 Royal Rumble, Punk returned from injury and had various encounters with Rollins, further enraging him. In November, Punk joined Roman Reigns's team as its fifth member at that year's Survivor Series: WarGames in the WarGames match on behalf of his former manager and Reigns's special counsel, Paul Heyman, with Heyman owing Punk a favor for agreeing to the match, which they won. Punk became the target of Rollins once again due to Rollins's hatred of both Reigns and Punk. This culminated in a match on Raw's Netflix premiere, in which Punk defeated Rollins. At the 2025 Royal Rumble, Punk eliminated both Reigns and Rollins before his own elimination. The three brawled at ringside where Rollins performed a two-footed stomp on Reigns, ruling him unable to compete for the next few weeks. Punk also eliminated Rollins from the men's Elimination Chamber match. Following his elimination, Rollins subsequently performed a Stomp on Punk, costing him the match. On the following episode of Raw, Punk spoke about his failure to compete in a WrestleMania main event before brawling with Rollins. They then faced each other the following week in a Steel Cage match, which Rollins won after a returning Reigns pulled him out of the cage to attack him as revenge from the Royal Rumble. Then, enraged by Heyman tending to Punk in the ring, Reigns also attacked Punk. After a brawl between the three men on the March 21 episode of SmackDown, a triple threat match was scheduled for WrestleMania 41. During the contract signing the following week, Heyman announced that the match would main event WrestleMania. While grateful for finally competing in the main event of a WrestleMania, Punk stated that it was not the favor he was owed from Heyman. On the April 4 episode of SmackDown, Punk revealed his favor which was that Heyman would be in his corner at WrestleMania, much to Reigns's dismay. On the subsequent episode of Raw on April 7, Rollins confronted and later assaulted Heyman; this brought out Punk and ignited a brawl between Rollins and Punk, where Rollins got the upper hand. While Heyman was tending to Punk, Rollins teased a Stomp on Heyman but stopped mid-way, stating that Heyman now owed him a favor. It was later confirmed that the match would be the main event of Night 1.

==== Undercard matches ====
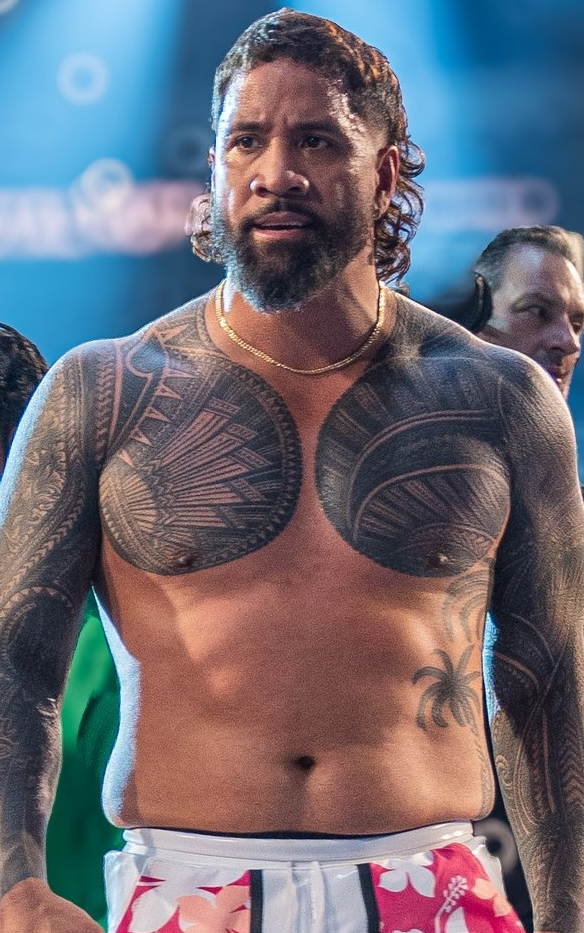
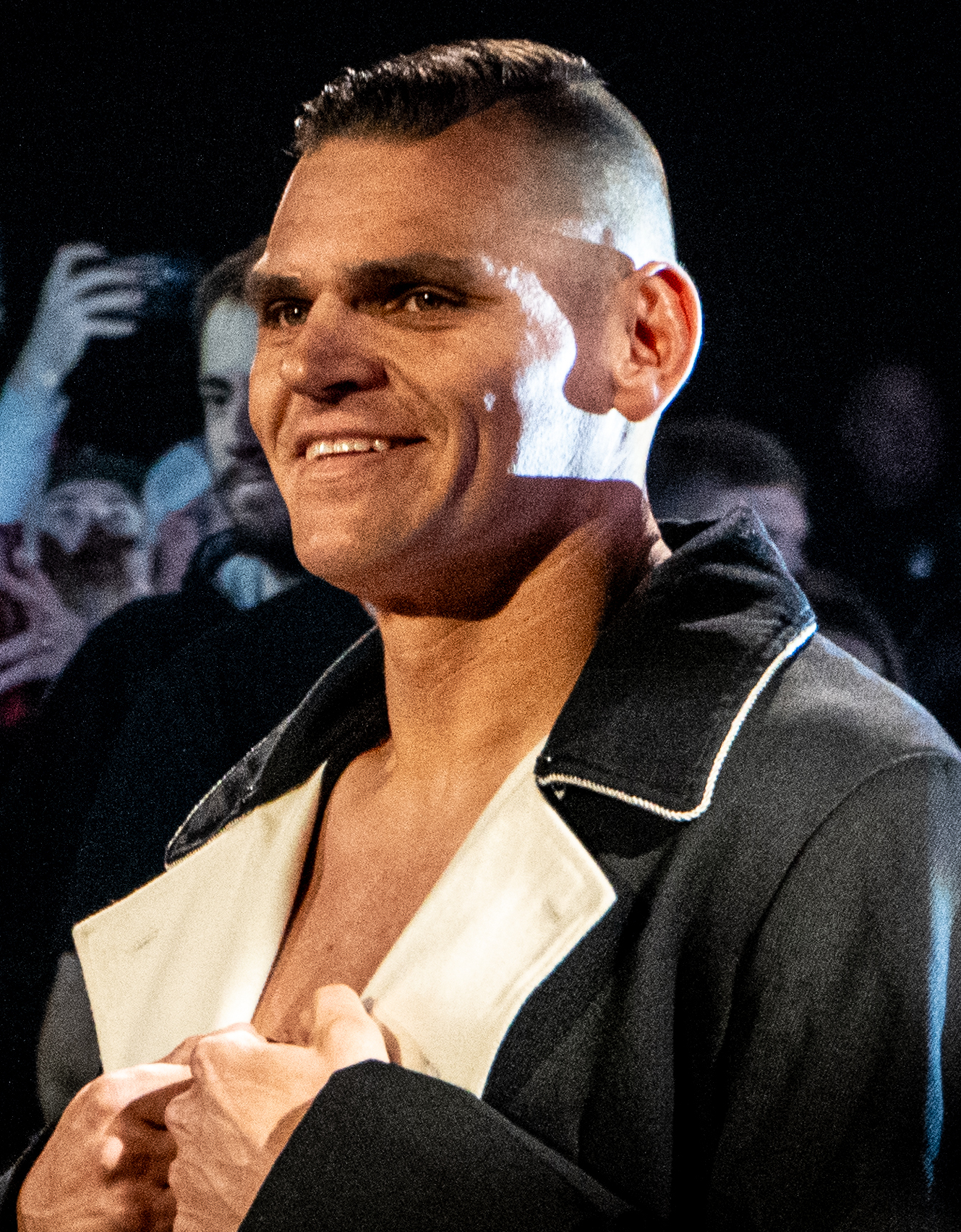
2025 Men's Royal Rumble winner Jey Uso challenged Gunther for Raw's World Heavyweight Championship on Night 1.

At Saturday Night's Main Event XXXVIII, Gunther defeated Jey Uso to retain Raw's World Heavyweight Championship. Uso then won the men's Royal Rumble match at the Royal Rumble the following week, earning a world championship match of his choice at WrestleMania 41. While not making an official decision, Uso confronted Gunther on the following Raw, where Gunther stated that Uso should choose SmackDown's world champion because he had already defeated Uso and instead deserved to defend the title against someone like John Cena. After making an appearance on that week's SmackDown, Uso opened the February 10 episode of Raw where he was attacked by Gunther. Uso subsequently decided he would challenge Gunther for the World Heavyweight Championship at WrestleMania 41. The match was later confirmed for Night 1.

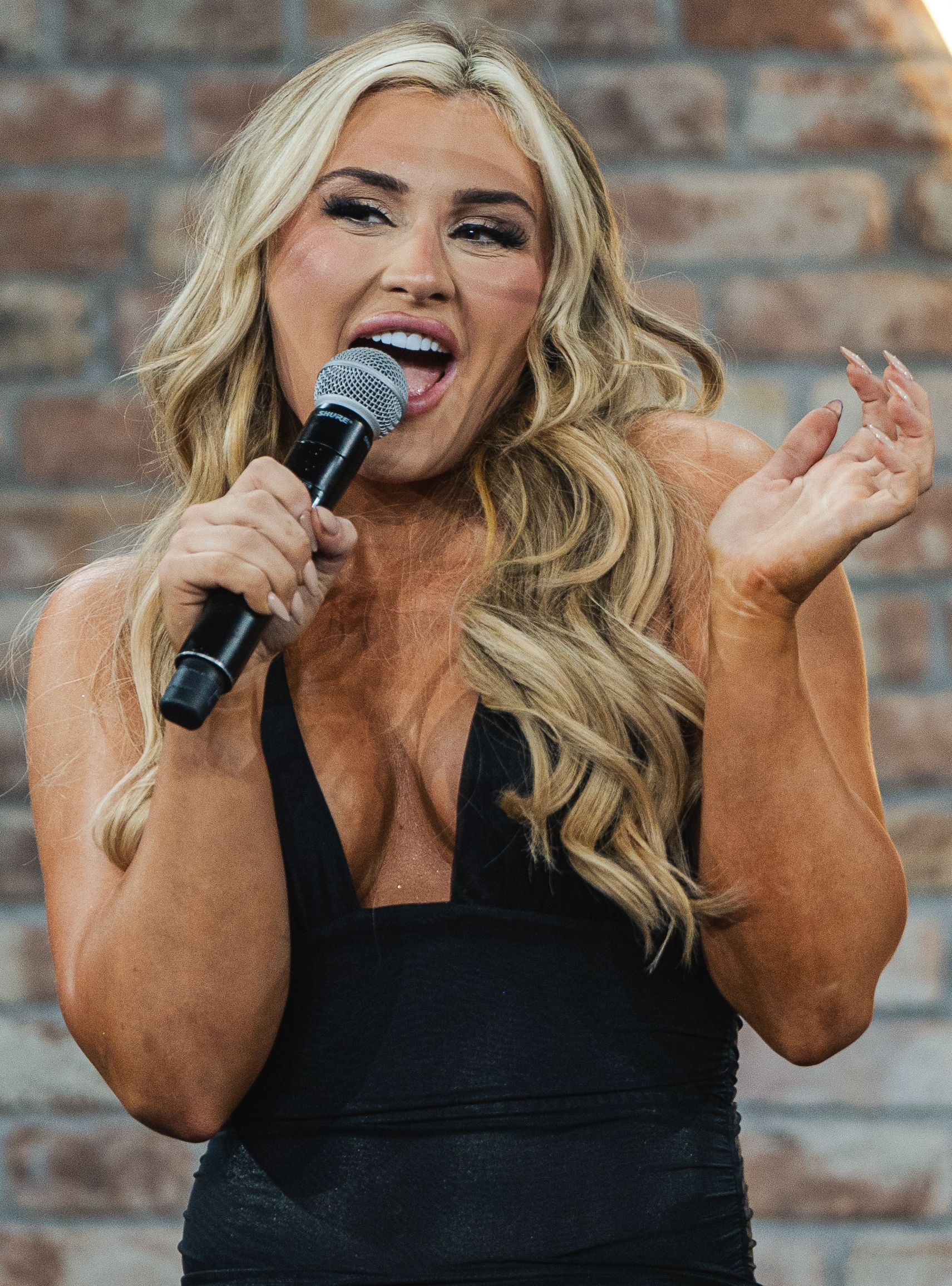
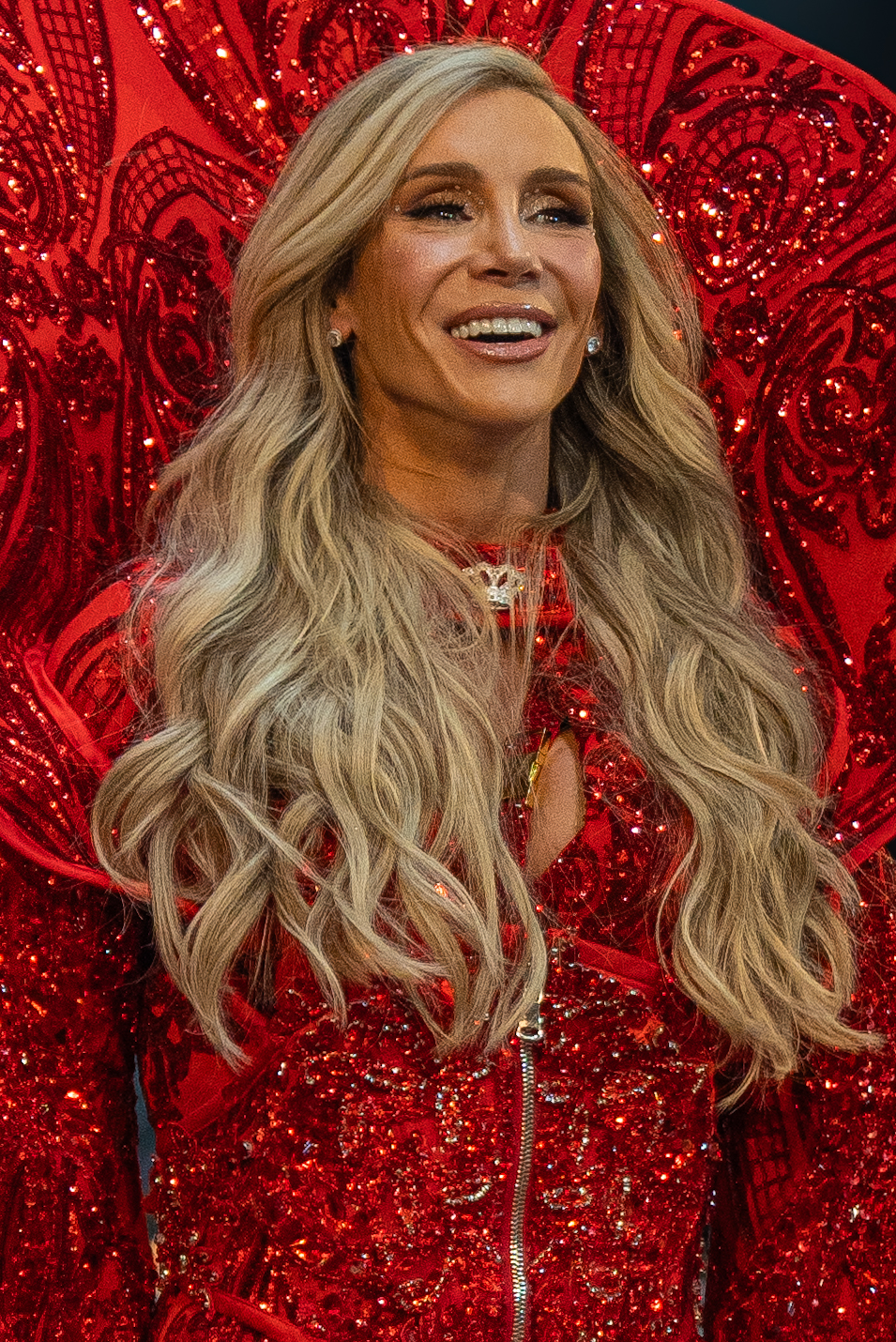
Tiffany Stratton defended SmackDown's WWE Women's Championship against 2025 Women's Royal Rumble winner Charlotte Flair on Night 1.

At the Royal Rumble, SmackDown's Charlotte Flair won the women's Royal Rumble match, earning a world championship match of her choice at WrestleMania 41. Flair subsequently appeared on the following episodes of Raw, NXT, and SmackDown to confront each brand's respective champions before finally choosing to challenge Tiffany Stratton for SmackDown's WWE Women's Championship at WrestleMania 41. The match was later confirmed for Night 1.

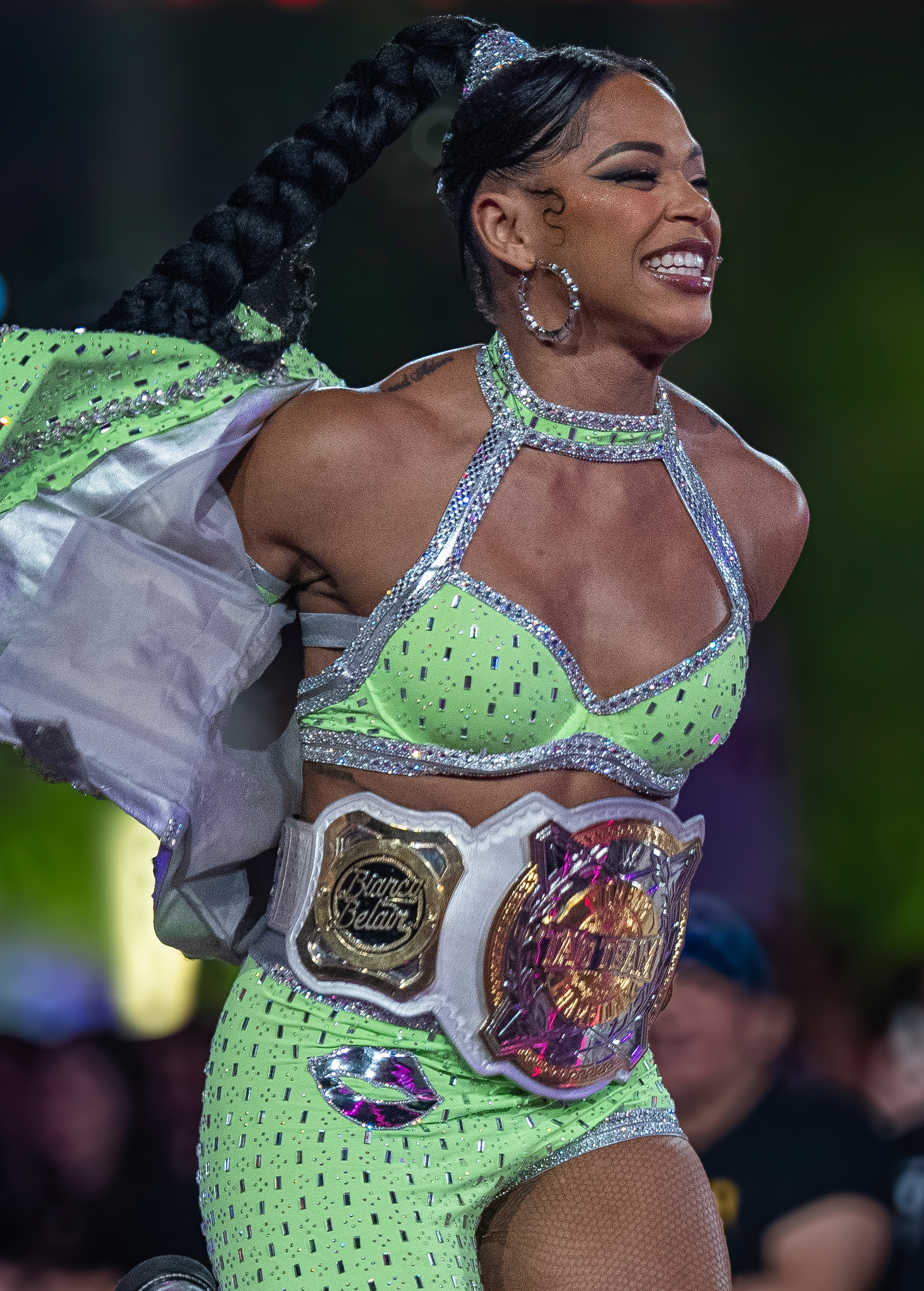
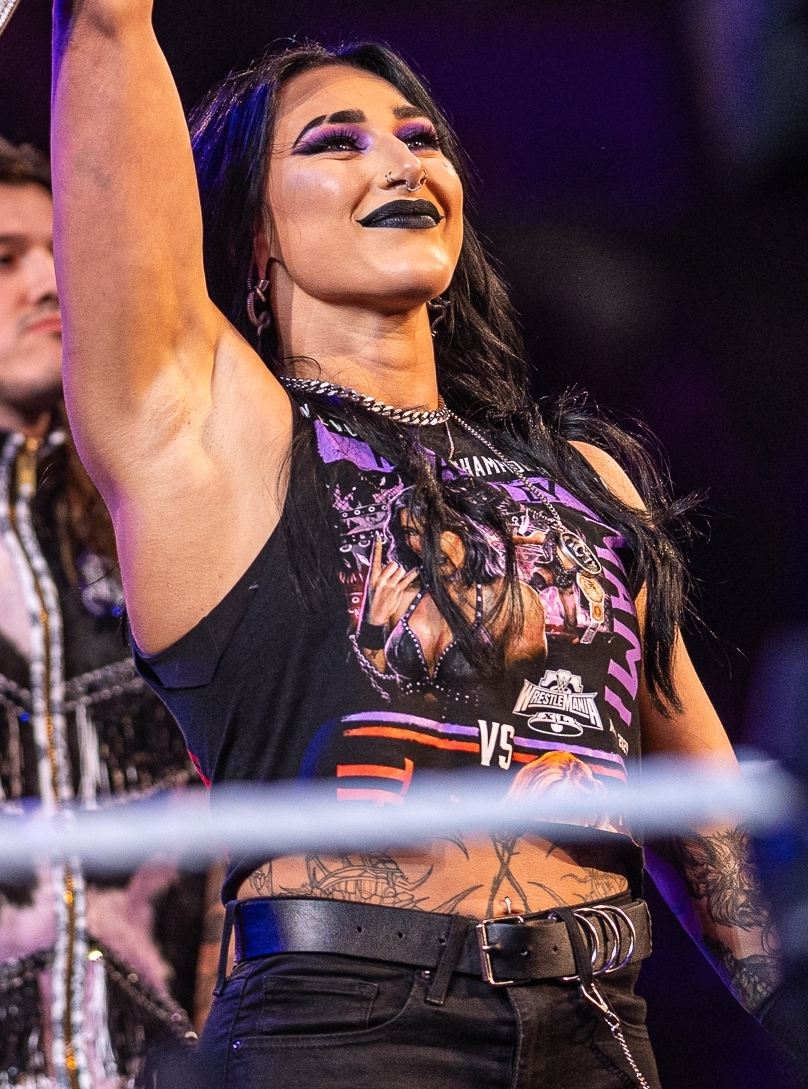
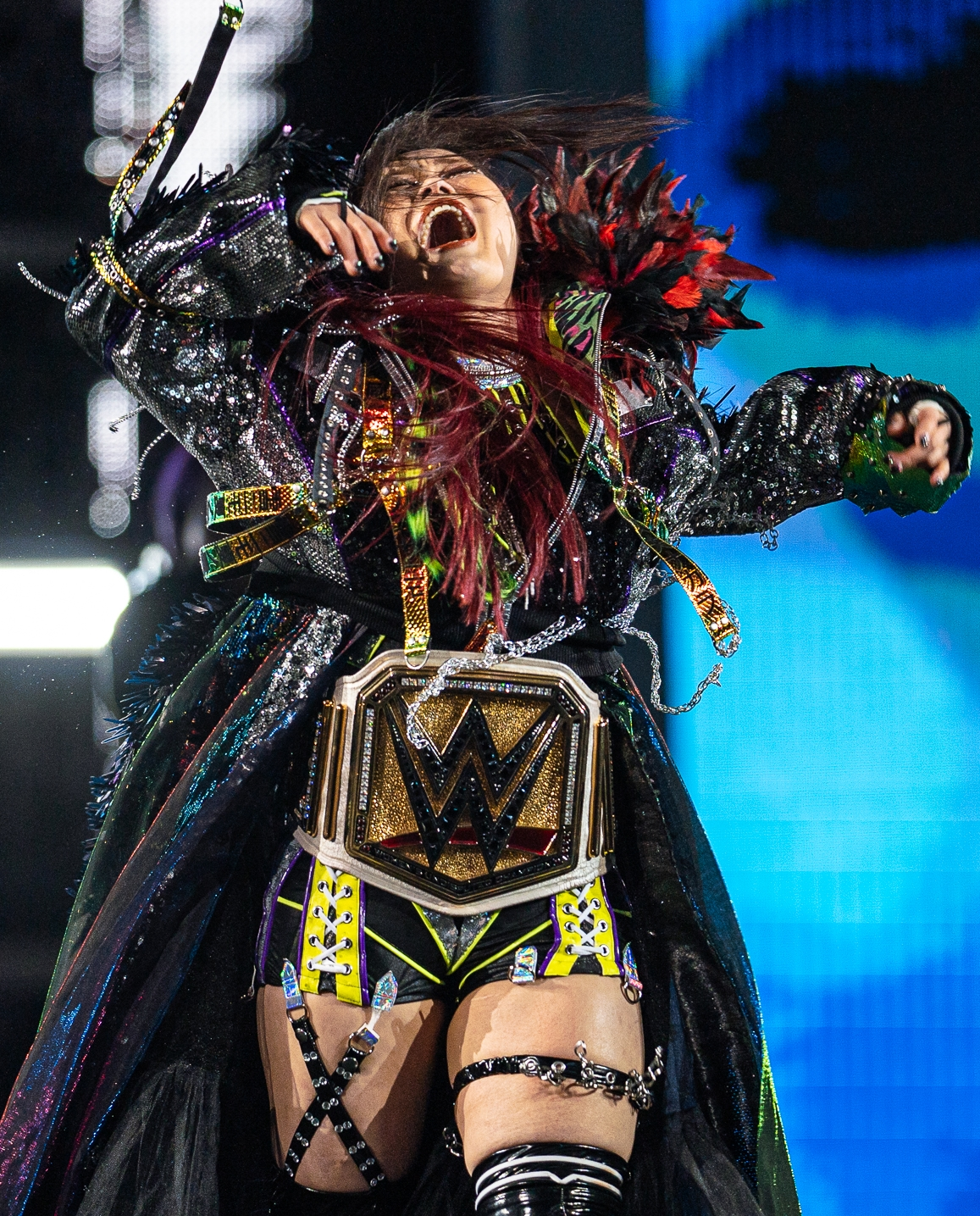
Bianca Belair and Rhea Ripley challenged Iyo Sky for Raw's Women's World Championship in a triple threat match on Night 2.

Throughout February, qualifying matches were held to determine the participants for the women's Elimination Chamber match at Elimination Chamber, with the winner earning a match for Raw's Women's World Championship at WrestleMania 41. During Iyo Sky's qualifying match, reigning Women's World Champion Rhea Ripley attacked Sky's opponent, unintentionally causing a disqualification loss for Sky. Due to this, Ripley rewarded Sky with a title match, which was scheduled for after Elimination Chamber on the March 3 episode of Raw. At Elimination Chamber, SmackDown's Bianca Belair won the eponymous match, while Sky subsequently defeated Ripley on Raw to win the title, confirming that Sky would defend the Women's World Championship against Belair at WrestleMania. During the contract signing on the March 17 episode, however, Ripley interrupted and performed a powerbomb on Sky onto Belair, after which, Ripley instead signed the contract. Sky was then scheduled to face Ripley on the March 31 episode in a title rematch with Belair as the special guest referee, which ended in a double disqualification, thus Sky retained. Raw General Manager Adam Pearce subsequently decided that Sky would defend her championship against both Belair and Ripley in a triple threat match at WrestleMania 41. The match was later confirmed for Night 2.

At the Royal Rumble, SmackDown's AJ Styles made a surprise return from injury and competed in the Royal Rumble match only to be eliminated by Raw's Logan Paul. As part of WWE's transfer window, Styles was transferred to the Raw brand. After several weeks of confrontations, Styles challenged Paul to a match on the March 31 episode of Raw, however, Paul declined, stating that he did not "fight for free" and pointed to the WrestleMania sign, after which, a brawl ensued between the two men. Later that night, Raw General Manager Adam Pearce scheduled a match between Paul and Styles for WrestleMania 41. The match was later confirmed for Night 2.

After LA Knight regained the United States Championship on the March 7 episode of SmackDown, several wrestlers stated their intentions to challenge Knight for the title, including The Bloodline's Jacob Fatu. On the March 21 episode, Braun Strowman, who had been embroiled in a rivalry with The Bloodline (Fatu, Solo Sikoa, and Tama Tonga) for the past few months, defeated Fatu via disqualification after Sikoa and Tama attacked Strowman, who as a result earned a title match against Knight that was scheduled for the following week, which ended in a no contest after Fatu attacked both Knight and Strowman. On the April 4 episode, Fatu defeated Strowman in a Last Man Standing match, earning a United States Championship match against Knight at WrestleMania 41. The match was later confirmed for Night 1.

On the February 10 episode of Raw, Bayley defeated Women's Intercontinental Champion Lyra Valkyria in a non-title match to qualify for the Elimination Chamber match at the namesake event. Two weeks later, Liv Morgan and Raquel Rodriguez won the WWE Women's Tag Team Championship. At Elimination Chamber, Morgan also competed and eliminated Bayley, although failed to win the match herself. On the March 10 episode of Raw, Rodriguez defeated Bayley to earn a future title match against Valkyria, but despite losing, Valkyria promised to give Bayley a future title match. On the March 24 episode, Valkyria defeated Rodriguez to retain the title despite interference from Morgan. After the match, both Rodriguez and Morgan attacked Valkyria, who was saved by Bayley. On the April 7 episode of Raw, Valkyria successfully defended the title against Bayley, and on that week's SmackDown, Bayley and Valkyria won a women's tag team gauntlet match to earn a title match against Morgan and Rodriguez at WrestleMania 41. The match was later confirmed for Night 2. However, prior to Night 1's broadcast, Bayley was attacked backstage and ruled unable to compete with Valkyria needing to find a new partner.

On the November 22, 2024, episode of SmackDown, Jade Cargill was found attacked by an unknown assailant in the parking lot and was ruled unable to compete for the foreseeable future. During Cargill's absence, Naomi volunteered to replace Cargill as one-half of the WWE Women's Tag Team Champions alongside Bianca Belair. Naomi and Belair also launched their own investigation into the attack on Cargill. They assumed that Liv Morgan and Raquel Rodriguez attacked Cargill and agreed to defend the championship against them on the February 24, 2025, episode of Raw, where they lost the title. Belair and Naomi then qualified for the women's Elimination Chamber match at the namesake event. However, before the match began, Cargill made her return and viciously attacked Naomi, who was deemed medically unable to compete in the match. On the following episode of SmackDown, Naomi revealed the truth that she was Cargill's attacker and regretted not doing it sooner, thus turning heel for the first time since 2016. Belair subsequently walked out on Naomi, ending their partnership. In the following weeks, Cargill and Naomi continuously attacked each other, leading to SmackDown General Manager Nick Aldis scheduling a match between them at WrestleMania 41. The match was later confirmed for Night 1.

On the February 17 episode of Raw, after Judgment Day member Dominik Mysterio's match, Intercontinental Champion Bron Breakker accidentally attacked Mysterio, which led to a non-title match between Mysterio and Breakker on the next episode. That match ended in disqualification after Mysterio's fellow stablemates Carlito and Finn Bálor attacked Breakker. On the next episode, The Judgment Day attacked Breakker, but he was able to get the upper hand. On the March 17 episode, Mysterio discussed adding Penta to their ranks, much to the irritation of Bálor. Later that night, Breakker defeated Bálor to retain the Intercontinental Championship. After the match, Mysterio and Carlito attacked Breakker before Penta appeared to even the odds. Breakker and Penta subsequently stared each other down. The following week, Mysterio formally offered Penta a spot in The Judgment Day. Later that night, Breakker defended the title against Penta, which Breakker won via disqualification after Mysterio and Carlito attacked him. After the match, Mysterio tried to have Penta attack Breakker with a chair, but instead, Penta attacked Mysterio. Breakker and Penta then faced Bálor and Mysterio in a tag team match the next week, which they won after Breakker accidentally speared Penta. On April 7, Raw General Manager Adam Pearce scheduled Breakker to defend the title against Bálor, Mysterio, and Penta in a fatal four-way match at WrestleMania 41. The match was later confirmed for Night 2.

Throughout late 2024 and early 2025, Chad Gable went on a losing streak against several luchadors. Gable subsequently took a sabbatical (kayfabe) from WWE to solve his "lucha libre problems". On the March 10 episode of Raw, an unidentified luchador with an American-style mask resembling Gable's faction, American Made, cost the Latino World Order (LWO) (Rey Mysterio and Dragon Lee) a tag team match. Gable denied that he was the luchador in question. The masked wrestler, named El Grande Americano, then defeated Lee in his "debut" match on the March 24 episode. Two weeks later, Americano and American Made members The Creed Brothers (Brutus Creed and Julius Creed) defeated the LWO (Lee, Joaquin Wilde, and Cruz Del Toro) in a six-man tag team match after Ivy Nile put a piece of metal in Americano's mask to use against Lee. Later that night, Mysterio said that Americano made a mockery of the art and tradition of lucha libre and requested a match against him, which Raw General Manager Adam Pearce accepted, allowing Mysterio to choose the place, and he chose WrestleMania 41. The match was later confirmed for Night 1. On the April 18 special edition of WrestleMania SmackDown, Rey Fénix eliminated Gable in the André the Giant Memorial Battle Royal, but later was eliminated by Americano, who was not involved on the match. Later that night, Mysterio, Lee, and Fenix would defeat Gable and The Creed Brothers in a six-man tag team match; however, during the match, Mysterio would suffer a legitimate injury, later revealed to be a torn groin. A day later on the Countdown to WrestleMania 41 Saturday pre-show, Mysterio announced that he was not medically cleared and would be replaced by Fenix.

Immediately after Drew McIntyre won the World Heavyweight Championship at WrestleMania XL, he taunted his then-rival, CM Punk, who was a special guest commentator for the match. Punk subsequently attacked McIntyre with his arm brace, allowing Damian Priest to successfully cash in his Money in the Bank contract on McIntyre and win the title, ending McIntyre's reign at just 5 minutes and 46 seconds. Over the next few months, Priest and McIntyre continued their feud, with Priest defeating McIntyre at Clash at the Castle to retain the title. At Money in the Bank, McIntyre won the namesake match, and later that night, unsuccessfully cashed in on Priest, who would later lose the title to Gunther at SummerSlam. In January 2025 as part of WWE's transfer window, both McIntyre and Priest were transferred to the SmackDown brand. Both men competed in the Royal Rumble and Elimination Chamber matches at the respective events, where Priest eliminated McIntyre in both. After the latter, McIntyre attacked Priest in retaliation, costing Priest the match. After several more weeks of altercations between the two men, on April 10, SmackDown General Manager Nick Aldis made a match between Priest and McIntyre official for WrestleMania 41, which was stipulated as a Sin City Street Fight. The match was later confirmed for Night 2.

After removing Big E from The New Day on the December 2, 2024, episode of Raw, Kofi Kingston and Xavier Woods set their sights on the World Tag Team Championship, held by The War Raiders (Erik and Ivar). During a title match between the two teams on the April 7, 2025, episode, Woods attempted to hit Erik with a steel chair; however, the referee saw Erik inadvertently hit Woods with the chair instead, thus The New Day won via disqualification, but since championships do not change hands via disqualification or countout unless stipulated, The War Raiders remained champions. After the match, The New Day attacked The War Raiders only to be stopped by WWE officials. On April 11, Raw General Manager Adam Pearce announced that The War Raiders would defend the World Tag Team Championship against The New Day in a rematch at WrestleMania 41. The match was later confirmed for Night 1.

On the special edition of WrestleMania SmackDown the night before WrestleMania 41, Randy Orton, who was initially scheduled to face Kevin Owens at WrestleMania before the match's cancellation due to Owens's legitimate injury, issued an open challenge for Night 2 of the event.

==== Cancelled and planned matches ====
At Bad Blood on October 5, 2024, fans captured footage of Kevin Owens attacking Cody Rhodes as the latter was entering his bus after the event went off the air. In the following weeks, Owens and Rhodes's mutual friend, Randy Orton, attempted to maintain peace, only for Owens to attack Orton in the parking lot, believing Orton aligned with Rhodes over him. At Crown Jewel on November 2, Orton and Owens were scheduled for a match; however, both engaged in a brawl throughout the arena with Owens getting the upper hand, with the match never officially beginning. On the following SmackDown, another brawl between them led to Owens performing a piledriver on Orton, taking him out until Elimination Chamber in March, where Orton returned and attacked Owens after Owens's victory over Sami Zayn in an unsanctioned match. On the following SmackDown, Orton spoke about the issues he had with Owens and vowed to get revenge, leading to Orton challenging Owens to a match at WrestleMania 41, which was made official. However, during the April 4 episode of SmackDown, it was revealed Owens would be unable to compete due to legitimately requiring neck surgery, causing the match to be canceled.

During the Netflix series WWE Unreal, which provided a look into the company's writers' room and backstage area, several matches that were not on the actual WrestleMania card were pitched and planned to be on the show. A ten-person mixed tag team match between The Wyatt Sicks and The Judgment Day was planned for WrestleMania, as well as two six-pack ladder matches for the Intercontinental and United States Championships, respectively. Dominik Mysterio, who was in the Intercontinental Championship four-way match, would have faced Bad Bunny in singles action, while actual Royal Rumble winner Jey Uso was planned to be in the Intercontinental Championship ladder match and face Damian Priest, Sami Zayn, Sheamus, Bronson Reed, and Ludwig Kaiser; the United States Championship ladder match would have been contested between LA Knight, Jimmy Uso, Andrade, Solo Sikoa, Santos Escobar, Carmelo Hayes, and Shinsuke Nakamura. Rey Mysterio (with Travis Scott in his corner) would have faced Chad Gable, but it was unclear if Gable would wrestle as El Grande Americano. "Stone Cold" Steve Austin was planned to appear at WrestleMania as the special guest referee for a singles match between Bron Breakker and Drew McIntyre. Charlotte Flair was planned to team up with a returning Becky Lynch to face Asuka and Iyo Sky of Damage CTRL for the Women's Tag Team Championships, while Rhea Ripley and Bianca Belair would face each other in a singles match for the Women's World Championship. Finally, a World Heavyweight Championship match between Gunther and CM Punk was planned as the main event for Night 1, which would have seen Roman Reigns and Seth Rollins face each other one-on-one instead of the triple threat match between Punk, Reigns, and Rollins.

== Event ==
=== Night 1 ===
Other on-screen personnel – Saturday
Role:	Name:
English commentators	Michael Cole
English commentators	Wade Barrett
English commentators	Pat McAfee
Spanish commentators	Marcelo Rodríguez
Spanish commentators	Jerry Soto
Ring announcer	Alicia Taylor
Referees	Danilo Anfibio
Referees	Shawn Bennett
Referees	Daphanie LaShaunn
Referees	Eddie Orengo
Referees	Charles Robinson
Referees	Ryan Tran
Referees	Rod Zapata
Interviewers	Cathy Kelley
Interviewers	Byron Saxton
Pre-show panel	Jackie Redmond
Pre-show panel	Joe Tessitore
Pre-show panel	Big E
Pre-show panel	Peter Rosenberg

==== Preliminary matches ====
WrestleMania Saturday began with WWE Chief Content Officer Paul "Triple H" Levesque hyping the crowd for the event.

In the first match, Gunther defended the World Heavyweight Championship against Jey Uso. During the match, Uso countered a powerbomb attempt from Gunther and performed an Uso Splash on Gunther for a nearfall. Gunther then attempted to leave the ring with the title belt only to strike Uso with it during a suicide dive attempt from Gunther. Gunther then followed up with a top-rope splash on Uso for a nearfall. In the closing moments, as Gunther attempted another powerbomb, Uso countered and performed his own powerbomb on Gunther. Uso followed up with three Uso Splashes and applied a sleeper hold on Gunther, who submitted, to win the title. Following the match, Jey celebrated with his twin brother Jimmy Uso in the ring, embracing each other.

Next, The War Raiders (Erik and Ivar) defended the World Tag Team Championship against The New Day (Kofi Kingston and Xavier Woods). In the end, Kingston and Woods performed Midnight Hour on Ivar to win the title, marking the team's first win and Woods's first win at a WrestleMania.

After that, Jade Cargill faced Naomi. During the match, Naomi performed a running bulldog and followed up with a split-legged moonsault on Cargill for a nearfall. In the end, Cargill performed a powerbomb and Jaded on Naomi to win the match.

In the fourth match, LA Knight defended the United States Championship against Jacob Fatu. Fatu dominated most of the match. In the climax, Knight countered a double-jump top-rope moonsault and performed the BFT on Fatu for a nearfall. Fatu then performed a top-rope Samoan Drop and two double-jump top-rope moonsaults on Knight to win the title.

After that, Rey Fenix faced El Grande Americano. During the match, Americano performed a top-rope moonsault senton on Fenix for a nearfall. In the closing moments, Fenix was unaware that Americano had inserted a metal plate into his mask and Americano performed a headbutt on Fenix in midair. Americano then performed a top-rope headbutt on Fenix to win the match.

In the penultimate match, Tiffany Stratton defended the WWE Women's Championship against Charlotte Flair. During the match, Flair performed a sitout powerbomb on Stratton for a nearfall. As Stratton attempted the Prettiest Moonsault Ever, Flair countered and rolled up Stratton for a nearfall. Flair performed a top-rope Natural Selection on Stratton for a nearfall. In the end, as Flair attempted a spear on Stratton, Stratton countered and performed a rolling senton and a Prettiest Moonsault Ever on Flair to retain the title.

==== Main event ====
In the main event, Roman Reigns, Seth Rollins, and CM Punk (accompanied by Paul Heyman) faced each other in a triple threat match. During the match, Punk performed a DDT on both Reigns and Rollins simultaneously. Punk performed an elbow drop on Rollins. Reigns performed a Superman Punch on Punk for a nearfall. Punk and Reigns countered the Spear and the Go To Sleep, respectively, and Punk applied the Anaconda Vice on Reigns. Rollins broke it up with a frog splash for a nearfall. Reigns performed a Spear on Punk and Rollins. As Reigns attempted a Spear, Rollins countered it into a Pedigree and followed up with the Stomp on Reigns for a nearfall. Punk performed a Go To Sleep on Reigns for a nearfall. Rollins then performed a Pedigree on Punk for a nearfall. Rollins attempted to coerce Reigns into teaming up to take out Punk; they teased a Shield Powerbomb on Punk before Reigns attacked Rollins and performed a solo powerbomb on Punk through the announce table. Reigns performed another powerbomb on Rollins through another announce table. A pivotal moment of the match saw Punk performing a Go To Sleep on Rollins, followed by Reigns performing a Spear on Punk, which was then followed up by Rollins rebounding off the ropes and performed a Stomp on Reigns, thus all three men were incapacitated for a while.

In the closing moments, whilst all three men were down, Heyman obtained a steel chair and handed it to Punk. However, before Punk could attack Reigns with the chair, Heyman betrayed Punk with a low blow and handed the chair to Reigns, who repeatedly struck Punk with the chair. As Reigns was about to strike Rollins with the chair, reminiscent of the way Rollins struck Reigns with a steel chair 11 years prior to break up Reigns and Rollins's faction The Shield, Heyman turned on Reigns with a low blow, and handed the chair to Rollins. Rollins then struck Reigns with the chair and performed the Stomp on Reigns to win the match.

=== Night 2 ===
Other on-screen personnel – Sunday
Role:	Name:
English commentators	Michael Cole
English commentators	Wade Barrett
English commentators	Pat McAfee
Spanish commentators	Marcelo Rodríguez
Spanish commentators	Jerry Soto
Ring announcer	Alicia Taylor
Referees	Danilo Anfibio
Referees	Jason Ayers
Referees	Jessika Carr
Referees	Dan Engler
Referees	Eddie Orengo
Referees	Chad Patton
Referees	Ryan Tran
Interviewers	Cathy Kelley
Interviewers	Byron Saxton
Pre-show panel	Jackie Redmond
Pre-show panel	Joe Tessitore
Pre-show panel	Big E
Pre-show panel	Peter Rosenberg

==== Preliminary matches ====
WrestleMania Sunday began with former WWE executive Stephanie McMahon hyping the crowd for the event.

In the first match, Iyo Sky defended the Women's World Championship against Bianca Belair and Rhea Ripley in a triple threat match. Sky performed a Blockbuster on Ripley and Belair at the same time, but both kicked out. Sky performed a moonsault on Ripley outside the ring. Belair clotheslined Ripley out of the ring and Sky rolled up Belair for a nearfall. Belair performed three consecutive suplexes on Sky. Ripley pulled Belair out of the ring and Belair slammed Sky into the barricade with Ripley. Inside the ring, Ripley performed a Razor's Edge on Sky onto Belair and pinned Sky for a nearfall. Sky performed Meteoras on Ripley and Belair. Sky attempted a moonsault, but Ripley caught up to her. Belair then suplexed Ripley and Sky. Belair performed a 450 splash on Sky, but Ripley broke up the pin and performed Riptide on Belair for a nearfall. Ripley attempted an Avalanche Riptide on Sky, who countered and followed up with a moonsault, but Ripley got her knees up. Belair performed the Kiss of Death on Sky, but Ripley broke up the pin. Ripley dominated Belair until Sky attempted a top-rope hurricanrana on Ripley, who countered and sent Sky into the ring post. After Ripley and Belair countered their respective finishers, Belair whipped Ripley with her braid and performed the Kiss of Death. Moments later, Sky performed a moonsault and pinned Belair to retain the title.

In the second match, Damian Priest faced Drew McIntyre in a Sin City Street Fight. During the match, McIntyre would repeatedly batter Priest with the steel steps; he would then grab his phone from ringside and take a selfie with Priest before taking to social media platform X (formerly Twitter) and posting "Still bored at work lol". McIntyre performed a Claymore Kick on Priest for a nearfall. McIntyre repeatedly struck Priest with a steel chair and wrapped it around Priest's neck. Priest avoided another Claymore Kick attempt and performed a chokeslam on McIntyre for a nearfall. Priest removed the protective pads from the turnbuckles before McIntyre performed a spinebuster on Priest. McIntyre then set up a table and attempted White Noise on Priest, who countered and performed Razor's Edge on McIntyre through the table for a nearfall. McIntyre performed a Future Shock DDT on Priest onto the steel stairs for a nearfall. Priest attempted Old School on McIntyre, who sent Priest outside of the ring through two tables. McIntyre performed a Claymore Kick on Priest through a steel chair for the win.

After that, Bron Breakker defended the Intercontinental Championship against Penta, Finn Bálor, and Dominik Mysterio. Breakker performed a Military Press Powerslam on Bálor and a Spear on Mysterio, only for Bálor to break up the pin. Penta performed the Penta Driver on Bálor only for Breakker to break up the pin. Penta performed a Mexican Destroyer on Mysterio, but Carlito pulled Penta out of the ring and Breakker speared Carlito through the announce table. Bálor performed a Coup de Grâce on Breakker, but Mysterio performed a Frog Splash on Bálor to win the title.

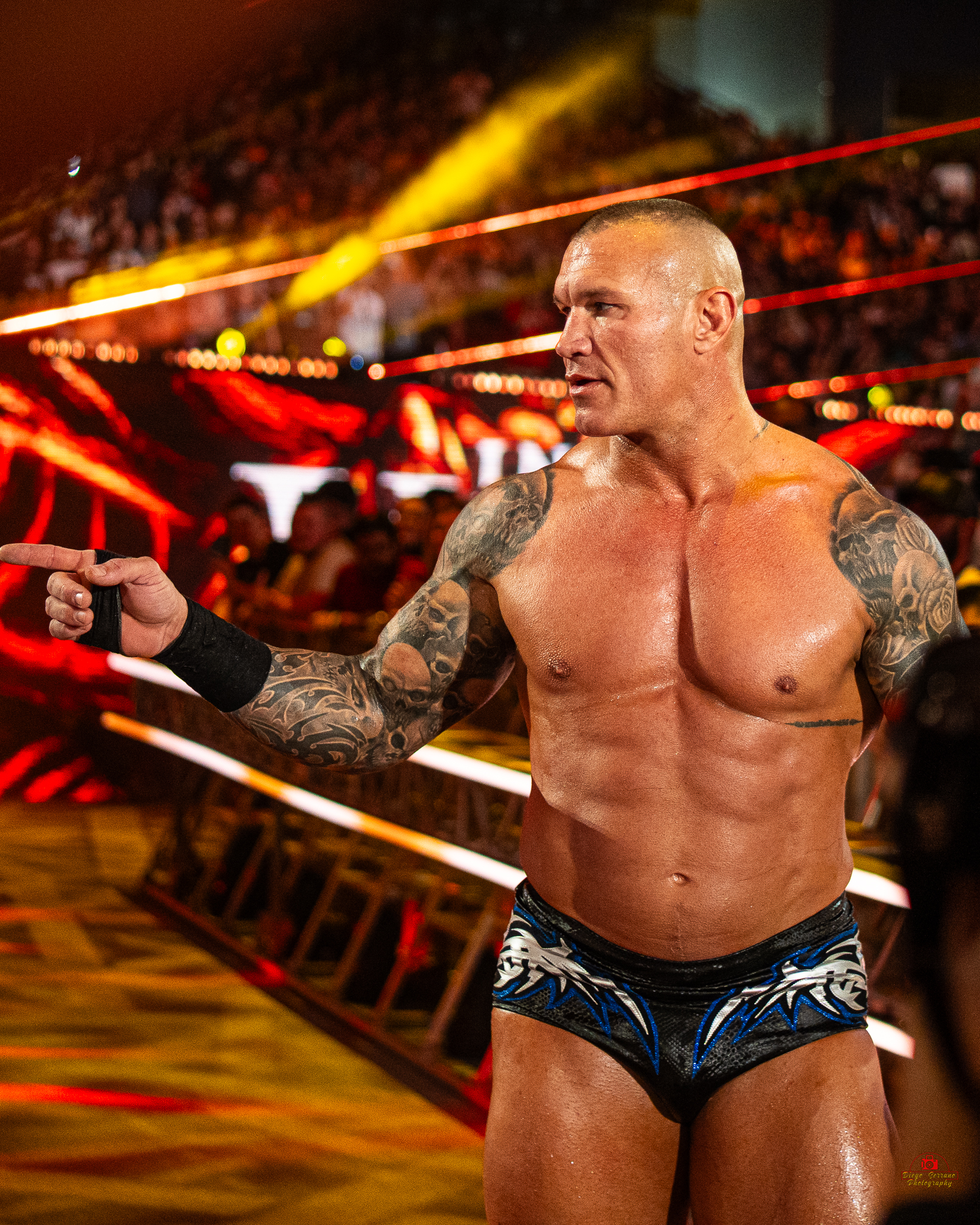
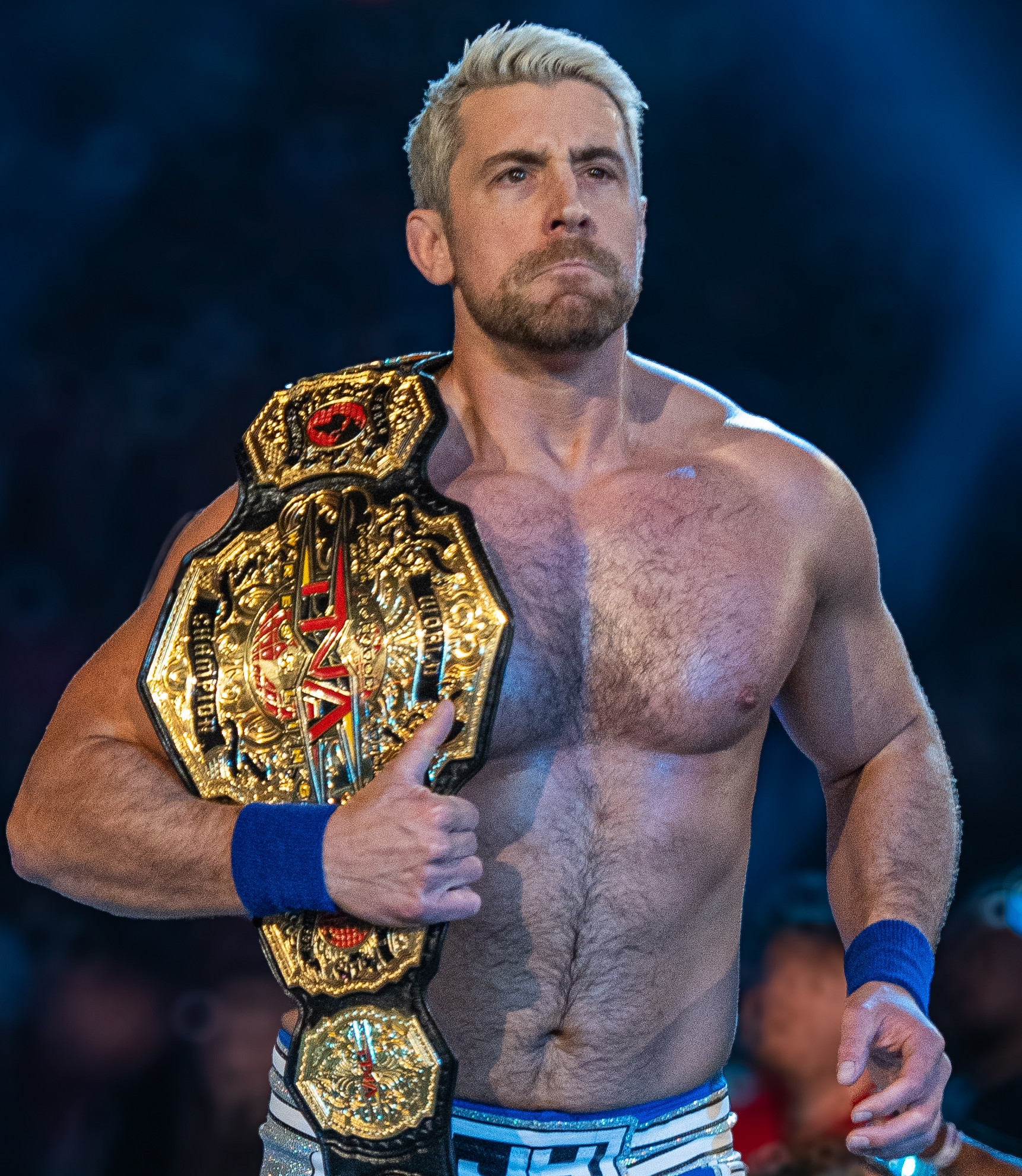
Randy Orton issued an open challenge on Night 2 after his initial opponent Kevin Owens withdrew due to a legitimate neck injury. The open challenge was answered by TNA World Champion Joe Hendry from WWE's partner promotion Total Nonstop Action Wrestling (TNA).

The fourth match was Randy Orton's open challenge. Orton's opponent was revealed to be TNA World Champion Joe Hendry from WWE's partner promotion Total Nonstop Action Wrestling (TNA). Hendry countered an RKO attempt into a fallaway slam. Orton then performed an RKO on Hendry to win the match.

Next, AJ Styles took on Logan Paul. Paul performed a Paul from Grace on Styles for a nearfall. Paul performed the Overbomb on Styles, who reached the ropes to break the pin. Styles performed a vertical suplex on Paul for a nearfall. Styles attempted a Phenomenal Forearm, but Paul countered and performed a rolling senton and a Lionsault on Styles for a nearfall. Paul performed a slingshot clothesline on Styles for a nearfall. Paul attempted the lucky punch, but Styles countered and performed a torture rack powerbomb on Paul for a nearfall. Styles attempted a 450 splash, but Paul got his knees up and performed his own Styles Clash on Styles, who performed the same move on Paul. Afterwards, Jeff, a member of Paul's entourage, appeared with brass knuckles, but Karrion Kross took them away. Styles sent Jeff into the barricade and tossed the brass knuckles away before punching Kross. Styles attempted the Phenomenal Forearm, but Paul ducked and performed the lucky punch and the Paulverizer on Styles to win the match.

The penultimate match was for the WWE Women's Tag Team Championship, where Liv Morgan and Raquel Rodriguez took on Lyra Valkyria and her mystery partner, who was revealed to be Becky Lynch. Morgan and Rodriguez dominated Valkyria until Lynch tagged in. Lynch applied the Dis-arm-her on Morgan, but Rodriguez broke up the submission. Lynch sent Rodriguez out of the ring and Morgan performed Oblivion on Lynch, but Valkyria broke up the pin. Valkyria performed a tornado DDT on Rodriguez outside the ring. Lynch then performed the Manhandle Slam on Morgan to win the title for herself and Valkyria.

Before the main event, "Stone Cold" Steve Austin arrived to announce Night 2's attendance as 63,226.

==== Main event ====
In the main event, John Cena faced Cody Rhodes in a singles match for the Undisputed WWE Championship. Cena performed a tornado DDT on Rhodes for a nearfall. Rhodes performed a powerslam, a Disaster Kick, and a Cody Cutter on Cena for a nearfall. Cena countered a Bionic Elbow attempt and performed an Attitude Adjustment on Rhodes for a nearfall. Rhodes countered an Attitude Adjustment attempt by Cena into a roll-up for a nearfall. Cena performed an Avalanche Attitude Adjustment on Rhodes for a nearfall. Cena leapt off the top rope, but Rhodes caught him with a powerbomb for a nearfall. Rhodes performed a springboard Cody Cutter on Cena for a nearfall. Cena countered a Cross Rhodes attempt into another Attitude Adjustment and applied the STF, and Rhodes kicked Cena into the referee. Rhodes performed a Cross Rhodes on Cena, who then removed the top turnbuckle. Cena sent Rhodes into the turnbuckle twice and performed a fourth Attitude Adjustment on Rhodes for a nearfall. Travis Scott then appeared, and when Rhodes performed Cross Rhodes on Cena, Scott pulled the referee out of the ring. Rhodes performed a Cross Rhodes on Scott and when Cena attempted to strike Rhodes with the title belt, Rhodes blocked and took it. After feigning forgiveness, Cena performed a low blow on Rhodes and struck Rhodes in the head with the belt to win the match and his record 17th WWE world championship, (Note: Until WrestleMania 41, WWE recognized the Universal Championship and WWE Championship as two separate titles which made up the Undisputed WWE Championship. This was amended following Cena's victory, with WWE recognizing a single WWE Championship reign and retiring the Universal Championship with Roman Reigns retroactively recognised as the final champion rather than Rhodes.)

== Reception ==
The event received generally mixed-to-positive reviews from critics. Shakiel Mahjouri of CBS Sports gave the Night 1 main event a grade of A+, calling it a "beautifully executed match, from Punk's entrance to the shocking conclusion". Wade Keller of Pro Wrestling Torch stated that "a lot happened in that match before Heyman helped Seth win, so that aspect of the way the story was told was contrived", and "one of the aspects of this story that felt weird was what a price they'd pay and how much they'd miss out on if either Punk or Reigns turned heel". Heyman's alliance with Rollins "gives Seth a new character to work with and a new dynamic", but Keller stated that it would take a lot to process "the Heyman-Seth dynamic", and "it makes sense that Seth believed this match would give him control of the industry".

For the Night 2 main event, Keller stated that WWE "managed to get through the match competently enough", but that it was "lame" for Travis Scott to be "the tipping point for Cena to win when nobody cares about him in the WWE context". Cena winning was not a surprise as "that did seem like the next logical chapter in the Cena retirement story", and Rhodes being booed was not "in a way that it seemed to just become the predominant story of the match". Brent Brookhouse of CBS Sports gave it a grade of C−, stating that "Scott interfering followed by a very obvious low blow and belt shot finish was just a disappointing way for things to end, especially considering the expectations for an appearance from The Rock". In November 2026, Cena himself reflected negatively on the match, stating that he and Rhodes "stunk up the joint" and "failed", although he praised their subsequent efforts to correct course, culminating in their SummerSlam rematch.

John Canton of TJRWrestling reviewed the second night of the event praising the Women's World Championship match, the Sin City Street Fight match, the Intercontinental Championship match and the AJ Styles vs. Logan Paul match but criticized the main event. Regarding the main event he said "It was slow paced and not the most entertaining match, but they got through it with a lot of twists and turns". He gave Night 2 an 8.5 out of 10.

Writing for the Wrestling Observer Newsletter for Night 1, Dave Meltzer gave the World Heavyweight Championship match a score of 3.75 stars, the World Tag Team Championship match 2.75 stars, the Naomi-Cargill bout 2 stars, the United States Championship match 3.75 stars, the Americano-Fenix match 2.75 stars, the WWE Women's Championship match 1.75 stars, and the Triple Threat main event 4.75 stars. For Night 2, he gave the Women's World Championship Triple Threat match 5 stars (the highest of the event, and the first women's match in WWE ever to receive such a rating from Meltzer), the Sin City Street Fight 4.25 stars, the Intercontinental Championship Fatal Four-way match 4.25 stars, the Orton-Hendry match no rating, the Styles-Paul bout 3.5 stars, the Women's Tag Team Championship match 2 stars, and the Undisputed WWE Championship main event 1.75 stars. The show did 66 million in live gate revenue (roughly 33 million for each night).

== Aftermath ==
=== Raw ===
John Cena opened the post-WrestleMania episode of Raw, stating that he was the last real undisputed champion of WWE, and was later attacked by Randy Orton with an RKO. Jey Uso was congratulated for winning the World Heavyweight Championship by a returning Sami Zayn in his first appearance since Elimination Chamber, as well as his brother Jimmy Uso.

As Seth Rollins and Paul Heyman were about to address their partnership, they were interrupted by first CM Punk and then Roman Reigns, which ignited a brawl. They were aided by Bron Breakker who joined Rollins and Heyman's alliance. On the May 5 episode, Rollins challenged Jey Uso for the World Heavyweight Championship, however, the match ended in a no-contest due to Punk attacking Rollins and Uso retaining the title.

Gunther took out his frustration of losing the World Heavyweight Championship on the Raw commentary team of Michael Cole and Pat McAfee, putting McAfee in a choke hold and incapacitating him after McAfee defended Cole. The following week, McAfee declared his intention to fight Gunther, and SmackDown's General Manager Nick Aldis, who was subbing for Adam Pearce that night, scheduled a match between them at Backlash.

Following his rivalry with Pat McAfee, on the May 12 episode of Raw, Gunther revealed that he would challenge for the World Heavyweight Championship on the June 9 episode. Jey Uso retained the title against Logan Paul at Saturday Night's Main Event XXXIX, thus setting up a WrestleMania rematch, where Gunther reclaimed the title.

Following a short hiatus, Cody Rhodes would return at Saturday Night's Main Event XXXIX, fending off John Cena when Cena interfered in the World Heavyweight Championship match between Jey Uso and Logan Paul on Paul's behalf. Rhodes and Uso would team up to defeat Cena and Paul in a tag team match at Money in the Bank, where Rhodes pinned Cena for the victory. Rhodes would go on to win the 2025 King of the Ring tournament at Night of Champions, earning a match for the Undisputed WWE Championship at SummerSlam and setting up a WrestleMania rematch with defending champion Cena. In the main event of Night 2 of SummerSlam, Rhodes defeated Cena in a Street Fight to regain the title. After the match, Cena would hand the title over to Rhodes and embrace him, reverting him face.

New WWE Women's Tag Team Champions Becky Lynch and Lyra Valkyria lost their titles to Liv Morgan and Raquel Rodriguez in a rematch, causing Lynch to turn on Valkyria post-match. The following week, Lynch revealed that she was the one who attacked Bayley, and she also stated that she attacked Valkyria because of Valkyria's friendship with Bayley, whom Lynch had numerous problems in recent years. Valkyria interrupted, wanting to fight Lynch on that night's episode, however, Lynch declined. Valkyria then decided to defend her Women's Intercontinental Championship against Lynch at Backlash, which Lynch accepted.

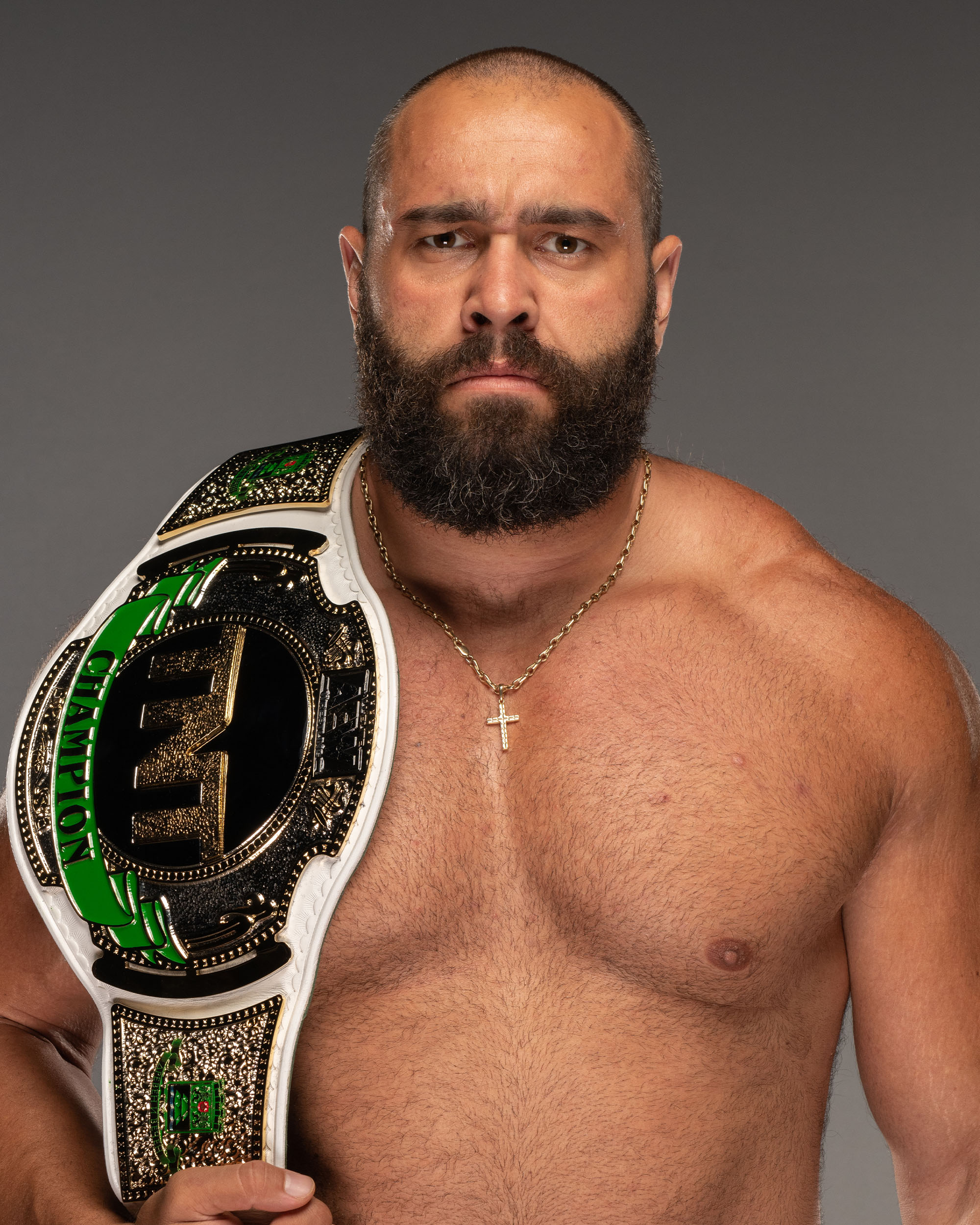
After a five-year absence, Rusev returned to WWE as part of the Raw brand.

New World Tag Team Champions The New Day (Kofi Kingston and Xavier Woods) were challenged by Alpha Academy (Akira Tozawa and Otis), however, the match never occurred due to a returning Rusev attacking both teams, re-establishing himself as a heel in the process. Women's World Champion Iyo Sky was challenged to a match by NXT Women's Champion Stephanie Vaquer only for NXT's Giulia and Roxanne Perez to interrupt the match and attack both women. Vaquer and Sky were then saved by Rhea Ripley, who seemingly wanted another Women's World Championship match. Ripley would go on to challenge Sky for the title at the all-women's event Evolution, where Naomi cashed in her Money in the Bank contract, which she won at Money in the Bank in June, as the match was in progress and defeated Sky and Ripley to win the championship.

New Intercontinental Champion Dominik Mysterio successfully defended his championship against Penta with the help from a returning JD McDonagh. A match between McDonagh and Penta was scheduled for the May 5 episode, which was won by Penta, who was subsequently scheduled to face Mysterio for the title at Backlash.

=== SmackDown ===
On the following episode of SmackDown, as Undisputed WWE Champion John Cena was about to cut another promo, he was interrupted by Randy Orton, who tried to get through to the now villainous Cena. After an exchange of words, Orton challenged Cena to a match for his championship that night; however, Cena declined, stating that the match should happen in Orton's hometown of St. Louis at Backlash, which was made official.

Jade Cargill faced WWE Women's Champion Tiffany Stratton in a non-title match, which ended when Naomi appeared and attacked Cargill, after which, Nia Jax attacked Stratton, signaling her intentions for the title. The following week, Cargill and Stratton defeated Jax and Naomi. After the match, Naomi attacked Cargill, wanting her own shot at the WWE Women's Championship. On the May 9 episode, Jax defeated Cargill after a distraction by Naomi to become the number one contender.

Jacob Fatu talked about his United States Championship win, only to be interrupted by LA Knight, who wanted a rematch for the title. Drew McIntyre interrupted, claiming Randy Orton leapt ahead of him in line for the Undisputed WWE Championship. General manager Nick Aldis then announced that Knight and McIntyre would face each other to determine the number one contender for the United States Championship. The match ended when Solo Sikoa attacked Knight and Priest attacked McIntyre. Afterwards, Fatu stood tall over Knight and Priest. The following week, Knight and Priest faced each other in a no-contest due to interference from Sikoa. After the match, Priest and Knight came out and brawled with Fatu and Sikoa. It was then announced that Fatu would defend the United States Championship against Priest, Knight, and McIntyre in a fatal four-way match at Backlash, in which Fatu won with the help of Jeff Cobb, who was shortly after renamed JC Mateo.

Bianca Belair mentioned that she walked out of WrestleMania with broken fingers but was proud of what she, Rhea Ripley, and Women's World Champion Iyo Sky did. Belair mentioned that she was on SmackDown while Ripley and Sky were on Raw, and she would handle unfinished business when she returned to Raw.

=== Broadcasting changes ===
In continuing WWE's near worldwide transition to Netflix, this would be the final WrestleMania to air on Disney+ in the Philippines before moving to Netflix on January 1, 2026. Throughout 2025, many of the select few countries that were still on the WWE Network due to pre-existing contracts gradually merged to Netflix with nearly all international markets on Netflix by January 1, 2026. The last few remaining countries that were still on the WWE Network merged under Netflix on April 1, 2026, making WrestleMania 41 the final WrestleMania to air on the WWE Network in any country. Additionally, on August 6, 2025, WWE announced that ESPN's direct-to-consumer streaming service would assume the streaming rights of WWE's main roster PLEs in the United States. This was originally to begin with WrestleMania 42 in April 2026, but was pushed up to September 2025 with Wrestlepalooza. As such, WrestleMania 41 was the last WrestleMania to livestream on Peacock in the US.

== Results ==
Night 1 (April 19)
No.	Results	Stipulations	Times
1	Jey Uso defeated Gunther (c) by submission	Singles match for the World Heavyweight Championship	16:30
2	The New Day (Kofi Kingston and Xavier Woods) defeated The War Raiders (Erik and Ivar) (c) by pinfall	Tag team match for the World Tag Team Championship	9:15
3	Jade Cargill defeated Naomi by pinfall	Singles match	9:20
4	Jacob Fatu defeated LA Knight (c) by pinfall	Singles match for the WWE United States Championship	10:40
5	El Grande Americano defeated Rey Fénix by pinfall	Singles match	7:55
6	Tiffany Stratton (c) defeated Charlotte Flair by pinfall	Singles match for the WWE Women's Championship	19:05
7	Seth "Freakin" Rollins defeated Roman Reigns and CM Punk (with Paul Heyman) by pinfall	Triple threat match	32:55
(c) / – the champion(s) heading into the match

Night 2 (April 20)
No.	Results	Stipulations	Times
1	Iyo Sky (c) defeated Bianca Belair and Rhea Ripley by pinfall	Triple threat match for the Women's World Championship	14:25
2	Drew McIntyre defeated Damian Priest by pinfall	Sin City Street Fight	13:55
3	Dominik Mysterio defeated Bron Breakker (c), Finn Bálor, and Penta by pinfall	Fatal four-way match for the WWE Intercontinental Championship	10:30
4	Randy Orton defeated Joe Hendry by pinfall	Singles match This was an open challenge.	3:10
5	Logan Paul defeated AJ Styles by pinfall	Singles match	17:50
6	Lyra Valkyria and Becky Lynch defeated Liv Morgan and Raquel Rodriguez (c) by pinfall	Tag team match for the WWE Women's Tag Team Championship	8:40
7	John Cena defeated Cody Rhodes (c) by pinfall	Singles match for the Undisputed WWE Championship	21:40
(c) / – the champion(s) heading into the match
