= Brian Nguyen =

American professional wrestling referee

- Born: September 25, 1981 (age 45); Malaysia
- Occupation: Professional wrestling referee
- Years active: 2010–present
- Employer: WWE

Brian Nguyen (born September 25, 1981) is an American professional wrestling referee currently signed to WWE performing under the name "Ryan Tran".

Of Vietnamese descent, he is known for officiating high-profile matches in WWE's flagship events and for his contributions to increasing representation of Asian-Americans in professional wrestling.

Nguyen began his WWE career in its developmental territory, NXT, before transitioning to the main roster.

== Early life and training ==
Nguyen was born in Malaysia on September 25, 1981, and raised in Hayward, California. He was trained by Harley Race.

== Professional wrestling career ==
Nguyen joined WWE as a referee in 2010, working initially in NXT. He was promoted to the main roster in February 2012, debuting on Raw.

At Crown Jewel 2018, Nguyen officiated the match between Shane McMahon and Dolph Ziggler. During the match, he ejected Drew McIntyre from ringside and ultimately awarded Ziggler a forfeit victory following an injury angle.

Ngueyn also played a central role at Survivor Series 2023, officiating both the women's and men's WarGames matches.

On the 13 June 2025 episode of SmackDown, he was part of a lighthearted segment following Randy Orton’s victory in a fatal four-way match. When Nguyen raised Orton's arm, Orton feigned an injury before laughing and revealing it was a prank.

== Career aspirations ==
In November 2023, Nguyen appeared on The Viet Q Podcast where he discussed his long-term goals within WWE. He expressed a desire to continue refereeing for another decade before transitioning into a backstage production role. He mentioned interest in video, audio, lighting, and overall show operations, believing that diversifying his skills would increase his value within the organisation.

== Personal life ==
Brian Nguyen is recognised as one of the first Vietnamese-American referees in WWE. His story was featured on The Viet Q Podcast, where he discussed representation and the importance of diversity in entertainment.
