= Professional wrestling in Israel =

Professional wrestling in Israel has been promoted since the 1950s after the nation's establishment.

== Israeli professional wrestling promotions ==
In the 1950s, Rafael Halperin worked in the United States as a professional wrestler in Vince McMahon Sr.'s Capitol Wrestling Corporation. He later returned to Israel, where he popularized professional wrestling. His most well known matches in Israel were against Achmad Fuad and the "Jordanian Tiger" Abu Antar. The match with Fuad took place on 18 June 1966 in front of 6,000 fans at the Bloomfield Stadium and caused the police to use tear gas after a big riot broke out immediately after Fuad attacked the victorious Halperin. The match with Abu Antar took place on 20 September 1973 and was the most successful local wrestling match seen in the country, as the Yad Eliyahu Arena was sold out to witness Halperin defeat the "Jordanian Tiger". This was Halperin's last match and afterwards he retired from professional wrestling.

Israeli Pro Wrestling Association (IPWA) is an independent wrestling promotion, the first such promotion operating in Israel. IPWA was founded on 17 October 2001 by Gery Roif and ran a few exhibition matches on national TV before holding the initial Summer Splash event in summer 2002. In 2005 almost the entire IPWA roster starred in a wrestling/social satire sitcom series "Makkat Medina" ("The Land Under Attack"), gaining further recognition in Israel. Both Kevin Von Erich and Bret Hart visited the crew during taping. On 16 August 2012 Tatanka main evented the Wrestling Super Show as he defeated Rabbi Swissa to win the IPWA Heavyweight Championship. Two months later the match was shown on Israeli sport channel ONE. On 19 April 2014 former two time WWE Cruiserweight champion and two time ECW Tag Team champion, Little Guido defeated Rabbi Swissa in IPWA's traditional Passover Bash which was the last show of the promotion. In April 2019 however, IPWA returned with an additional Passover Bash event, which is scheduled to feature Jay Lethal defending the ROH World Championship against David Starr. The card is also scheduled to include a championship match between Roif and Matt Sydal. In December 2019 IPWA held Cinema City Wrestling – a huge event at Cinema City Glilot, featuring IPWA Champion Matt Sydal vs. WWE Hall of Famer Billy Gunn, AEW's Sammy Guevara and AEW's Darby Allin squaring off against Rabbi Swissa. In June 2022 IPWA held WrestleMitzvah in Cinema City Glilot, that even aired on Fite TV. The first ever IPWA Women's champion was crowned as Emersyn Jayne from Scotland defeated Ireland's Session Moth Martina. UK's Heidi Katrina beat France's Mila Smidt, Liverpool's Harley Hudson defeated Leeds' Kacie and UK's Cara Noir beat Yuval Goldshmit. Rabbi Swissa held his retirement match on this show against Big Yarin Elkariff. October 2023 IPWA was supposed to hold a big event "Young and Wrestlers" at the Netanya City Hall Arena featuring UK's Harley Hudson, Aleah James, Safire Reed, Scotland's Emersyn Jayne and more. However, due Hamas' attack on Israel the show was cancelled. In February 2024 IPWA reopened their Wrestling School at Gabi Noah Gym in Netanya and returned to full operation since. In September IPWA held a show called "New Generation" featuring the new trainees, with AVIZOV defeating Matan Katz to become the new IPWA World champion. The next IPWA shows to be held are "Empowerment" on 11 November in Netanya and "Wrestling like in America" on 12 February 2025 in Tel Aviv.

All Wrestling Organization (AWO) was founded in early June 2012 by Mahran Abdul Hai, as Israel's second promotion. The debut show, "WrestleFest", was held on 21 June in front of a sold-out crowd of 600 fans. The show was sponsored and broadcast by Panet. On 21 November 2013 Joe E. Legend main evented the "Autumn Fallout" show which took place in Tel Aviv. On 29 May 2014 the promotion ran the first local professional wrestling show in Haifa. The show was taped and was broadcast on the Ego Total channel. "WrestleFest III" took place on 26 June 2014 and saw the debut of former WWE superstars Carlito and Chris Masters (who won the AWO championship). This show was also broadcast on Ego Total as well as the main Ego channel. AWO currently has two championships, the AWO Heavyweight Championship and the AWO Israeli Championship.

Israeli Wrestling League (IWL), a third wrestling federation in Israel was founded in 2013 by Eitan Levy and Lidor Bushari. The first performance of the league took place in May 2013 during the filming of the wrestling season in the fourth season of HaYafa VeHaChnun, the Israeli version of Beauty and the Geek. The wrestling academy, led by Lidor Bushari, opened in May 2014 in Rehovot at the Alternative Sports Center, where performances were held every two-month. As of 2017, the academy operates in Petah Tikva, where its shows are being held as well. The IWL has one belt, the IWL Heavyweight Championship. The IWL held its final show in 2019 prior to the COVID-19 Pandemic with the hope of finding a new venue but was unable, this led to the organization closing down and their ring was sold.

On 12 August 2015, Chaos defended the Union of European Wrestling Alliances European Heavyweight Championship in Tira for All Wrestling Organization.

Ultimate Wrestling Israel (UWI), the fourth wrestling federation in Israel was founded in November 2015. The UWI currently has one belt, the UWI Shomer Shabbos Heavyweight Championship, previously known as the UWI Heavyweight Championship until February 2017.

In July 2017 the Drive in Arena in Tel Aviv hosted the largest wrestling show in Israel in over 20 years, known as the Rage Megashow. The show was attended by a crowd of 850 fans, it featured the return of Kevin Von Erich (with his sons Ross and Marshall) Tatanka and Marty Jannetty to Israel. Other international stars included Bad Bones, David Starr, and Jurn Simmons.

In 2023, Israeli comedian Jonathan Barak announced that he was opening Wrestling Israel. Barak had purchased the ring previously owned by the Israeli Wrestling League and began posting photos and videos to Social Media to promote the league. While the opening of the promotion has been delayed due to the outbreak of the Gaza war, the organization is continuing to work behind the scenes to get things ready to run shows and open an academy.

== Overseas wrestling promotions in Israel ==
=== All Star Wrestling ===
British promotion All Star Wrestling – at the time the recipient of a share of ITV television coverage in the UK – toured Israel in the late 1980s. Lead heel Kendo Nagasaki included a group photo of the tour party at Ben Gurion Airport in his 2018 autobiography. As well as himself, his manager "Gorgeous" George Gillette, frequent tag partner "Psycho" Shane Stevens and personal assistant Lawrence Stevens, the tour party as pictured included future WCW/WWE wrestler William Regal (then known as Steve Regal), future WCW/TNA wrestler Dave Taylor, then British Ladies Champion Mitzi Mueller, her frequent rival (and successor following Mueller's retirement) Klondyke Kate and Mueller's husband, referee and ASW promoter Brian Dixon.

=== Edwin Shoburgh promotion ===
German promoter Edwin Shoburgh toured Israel in late 1976 with a roster including British wrestler Colin Joynson. The day before his departure, Joynson filmed a loss to Kendo Nagasaki 30 November 1976 in Solihull for ITV's World of Sport (transmitted Saturday 11 December 1976) during which commentator Kent Walton mentioned that Joynson would be leaving on the Israel tour the next day.

=== Total Nonstop Action ===
In September 2007 Total Nonstop Action Wrestling announced two shows to take place in Tel Aviv in November, in the Nokia Arena. Wrestlers promoted to attend included TNA World Heavyweight Champion Kurt Angle, Samoa Joe, Christian Cage, Abyss, AJ Styles, X Division Champion Jay Lethal, Team 3D, Triple X, Sonjay Dutt, James Storm, Gail Kim, Jackie Moore, Chris Harris, Eric Young, Robert Roode, Voodoo Kin Mafia, and Petey Williams. The tour was ultimately canceled stating business reasons.

Both the Impact! TV series and pay-per-views are carried on EGO Total in Israel.

=== Major League Wrestling ===
In January 2019 Major League Wrestling announced EGO Total as their first international TV partner.

=== Ring of Honor ===
In February 2019, it was announced that in April Ring of Honor scheduled Jay Lethal to defend the ROH World Championship against David Starr at IPWA's Passover Bash. Should Lethal lose the championship prior to the match, Starr would instead face whoever the new champion is at the time. In March, Starr released a video on his feelings on the match, which Ring of Honor ordered to have taken down. In early April however, Lethal lost the championship at G1 Supercard, however the new champion did not appear, and Lethal appeared as a non-champion. Starr proceeded to call out Ring of Honor again, for failing to deliver on their promises.

=== World Class Championship Wrestling ===
Kevin Von Erich and his brother Mike Von Erich came to Israel in the early 1980s. The Von Erich family were wrestling for World Class Championship Wrestling which was carried in Israel on Middle East Television, on Saturday nights. During this time, WCCW was the most popular English-language program in Israel. The Von Erich family trip to Israel was considered very successful and credited them for bringing popularity of professional wrestling to Israel. During the tour, WCCW created a WCCW Middle Eastern Championship which Mike Von Erich won defeating Gino Hernandez on 7 August 1985. Among the main participants on the Israel tour included Chris Adams, Iceman King Parsons, Buddy Roberts, Scott Casey, Brian Adias, Rip Oliver, Kelly Kiniski and Johnny Mantell.

=== WWE ===
==== WWE on TV ====
In the early 1990s the WWF (now WWE) was broadcast on Friday afternoons in Israel on Sport 5. As publicity for the program the WWF gave out free photo albums to high school kids. In 1995 Dafna Lemish began a successful campaign to remove WWE content from TV, claiming a direct correlation between wrestling and violence in schools. Eventually WWE programming was brought back to Israel, with Raw and SmackDown broadcasting on Sport 1 and Sport 1 HD. Beginning in 2025, all WWE programming, moved to Netflix in Israel.

The NXT vs. TNA Showdown special was set to be named Invasion, reviving the "Invasion" event name from 2001, but due to controversy regarding the name and date coinciding with the second anniversary of the October 7 attacks in southern Israel in 2023, WWE changed the name to Showdown.

==== Live shows ====
The WWF made several live appearances in Israel beginning in 1991 following the end of the Gulf War, most notably, Owen Hart prayed in the Western Wall in Jerusalem. In July 2006 the WWE scheduled live events in Tel Aviv for their SmackDown brand, however due to the 2006 Lebanon War the WWE postponed the events to September, before eventually canceling the show, after having sold 22,000 tickets.

Date	City	Matches
7 October 1993	Tel Aviv	1-2-3 Kid beat Doink the Clown (Steve Lombardi; Razor Ramon (IC) beat I.R.S. via count-out Bob Backlund beat Papa Shango; The Headshrinkers beat The Smoking Gunns; Diesel beat The Brooklyn Brawler (subbing for Mr. Perfect (wrestler)); The Undertaker beat Adam Bomb (subbing for Mr. Hughes) in a casket match Lex Luger beat Ludvig Borga (subbing for WWF World Champion Yokozuna)
8 October 1993	Haifa	1-2-3 Kid beat Doink the Clown (Steve Lombardi; Razor Ramon (IC) beat I.R.S. via count-out Bob Backlund beat Papa Shango; The Headshrinkers beat The Smoking Gunns; Diesel beat The Brooklyn Brawler (subbing for Mr. Perfect (wrestler)); The Undertaker beat Adam Bomb (subbing for Mr. Hughes) in a casket match Lex Luger beat Ludvig Borga (subbing for WWF World Champion Yokozuna)
7 February 1994	Jerusalem	Adam Bomb beat Billy Gunn; Kwang beat Jim Powers; The Steiner Brothers beat The Quebecers (TT) via count-out Lex Luger beat Jeff Jarrett via count-out Doink the Clown beat Bam Bam Bigelow; Diesel beat Billy Gunn (subbing for Marty Jannetty); Bret Hart beat Yokozuna (HW) via disqualification
8 February 1994	Tel Aviv	Billy Gunn beat Adam Bomb; Jeff Jarrett beat Jim Powers; The Steiner Brothers beat The Quebecers (TT) via count-out Doink the Clown beat Bam Bam Bigelow; Diesel beat Billy Gunn (subbing for Marty Jannetty); Bret Hart and Lex Luger beat Yokozuna and Kwang
2 April 1994	Haifa	Earthquake beat Kwang; Bam Bam Bigelow beat Tatanka; Diesel beat Randy Savage; Bret Hart (HW) beat Owen Hart; Men on a Mission beat The Headshrinkers
2 April 1994	Holon	Earthquake beat Bam Bam Bigelow; Kwang beat The 1-2-3 Kid; Fatu beat Mo; Mabel beat Samu; Tatanka beat Jeff Jarrett via disqualification Diesel beat Randy Savage via count-out Bret Hart and Razor Ramon beat Owen Hart and Shawn Michaels
3 April 1994	Tel Aviv	Bam Bam Bigelow beat Tatanka; Jeff Jarrett beat the 1-2-3 Kid; Earthquake beat Kwang; Razor Ramon (IC) beat Shawn Michaels; Mo defeated Fatu; Diesel beat Randy Savage via count-out Bret Hart beat Owen Hart
4 December 1994	Tel Aviv	Aldo Montoya beat Quebecer Pierre; The Bushwhackers beat Timothy Well and Barry Horowitz (subbing for Steven Dunn); Duke Droese beat Kwang; Lex Luger beat Tatanka; Razor Ramon (IC) beat Jeff Jarrett; The Smoking Gunns beat The Heavenly Bodies via disqualification Davey Boy Smith beat King Kong Bundy

IC = Entered match as Intercontinental Champion
TT = Entered match as Tag Team Champion
HW = Entered match as Heavyweight Champion

== Israeli impact on overseas wrestling ==
The UWF Israeli Championship was a secondary title in the Universal Wrestling Federation. It was awarded to Joshua Ben-Gurion in May 1991 and retired in November 1991.

Israeli wrestler Aviv Maayan competed extensively in the United Kingdom in the 2000s. both for traditional "Old School" companies such as All Star Wrestling and Premier Promotions and for Americanised "New School" promotions such as Revolution Pro Wrestling and IPW:UK in both of which he held the promotions' lead heavyweight singles titles.

In response to the 2014 Jerusalem synagogue attack, World Championship Wrestling veteran, Bill Goldberg, put on Tefillin to raise awareness of the incident.

Noam Dar, was born in Beer Yaakov and raised in Ayr. Dar was a contestant on Season 2 of Total Nonstop Action Wrestling's British Boot Camp which was televised nationally in the UK on Challenge TV. Dar advanced to the final six but the competition but ultimately did not win. On 31 March 2016, Dar was announced as a participant in WWE's upcoming Global Cruiserweight Series tournament, making him the first Israeli wrestler to perform in the WWE. Dar currently wrestling on the NXT brand.

On 7 August 2017, Israeli Tomer Shalom made his WWE debut in a match against Jason Jordan.

Despite the boycott imposed by the Arab and Muslim-majority states, Israelis sometimes compete with Arab or Muslim wrestlers (particularly Noam Dar competing against Mustafa Ali).

== See also ==
- Sports in Israel
- Boycotts of Israel in sports
