= UWL =

UWL may refer to:

- Ultimate Wrestling Israel
- University of West London
- University of Wisconsin–La Crosse
- Upper Warlingham railway station, Surrey, England (National Rail station code UWL)
