= Israeli Wrestling League =

- Acronym: IWL
- Founded: 2013
- Style: Professional wrestling
- Headquarters: Rehovot
- Founder(s): Eitan Levy & Lidor Bushary
- Owner(s): Eitan Levy & Lidor Bushary
- Website: israeliwrestling.co.il

Israeli Wrestling League (IWL) (Hebrew: ליגת ההיאבקות הישראלית; Arabic: رابطة المصارعة الإسرائيلية, Rabitat al-musaraeat al-israyiylia), is an Israeli professional wrestling promotion founded in 2013 by Eitan Levy & Lidor Bushary. Its first show was in May 2013 during the filming of the wrestling season in the fourth season of HaYafa VeHaChnun, the Israeli version of Beauty and the Geek. The wrestling academy, led by Lidor Bushary, opened in May 2014 in Rehovot at the Alternative Sports Center, where performances are held every two month. The IWL has one belt, the IWL Heavyweight Championship. As of 2016, the IWL does not pay their wrestlers, in order to keep costs down. The promotions' final event was IWL XX in 2018.

== Wrestling academy ==
The league runs the largest wrestling academy in Israel, led by Lidor Bushary, a fitness and coaching coach and professional wrestling coach, the first in Israel to be certified by the Wingate Institute.

The Academy also has their own shows, albeit smaller than the Main Roster with mainly trainees family and friends in attendance.

=== IWL Academy 3 ===
No.	Results	Stipulations
1	Max Stanger defeated Aviv Erad (w/Yonatan 2.0)	Singles match
2	Ori Avram (w/Max Havok) defeated Hadar Horovitz	Singles match
3	Aaron Gindi defeated Yuval Goldshmit	Singles match
4	Ori Shmuel defeated Yarin Elkarif	Singles match
5	Adi Hurvitz defeated Yonatan 2.0 (w/Aviv Erad)	Singles match
6	Omer Philip defeated Adam Rabinovitz	Singles match
7	Edan Nissen defeated Daniel Kutchkin	Singles match
8	Ori Gold defeated Amit Magnezi	Singles match

=== IWL Academy 4 ===
No.	Results	Stipulations
1	Aharon Gindi defeated Hadar Horovitz	Singles match
2	Tony defeated Adam Rabinovitz	Singles match
3	Yarin Elkarif defeated Shalev	Singles match
4	Yonatan Goldshmit defeated Omer Rottstein	Singles match
5	Omer Philip defeated Shlomo	Singles match
6	Aviv Erad (w/Yonatan 2.0) defeated Ori Gold	Singles match
7	Edan Nissen defeated Pillar of Fire	Singles match
8	Daniel Kutchkin & Max Stranger defeated Amit Magnezi & Ori Avraham	Tag match

=== IWL Academy 5 ===
No.	Results	Stipulations
1	Omri Avili Gindi defeated Yuval Goldshmit	Singles match
2	Yarin Elkarif defeated Omer Philip	Singles match
3	Ma'ayan defeated Hadar Horovitz	Singles match
4	Aharon Gindi defeated Ori Gold	Singles match
5	Adam Rabinovitz & Aviv Erad defeated Shalev & Yonatan Goldshmit	Tag match
6	Tyler Dawn defeated Edan Nissen	Singles match
7	Daniel Kutchkin & Max Stranger & Rimon defeated Amit Magnezi & Ori Avraham & Chen	Mixed Tag match

== IWL special events ==
The IWL events feature professional wrestling matches that involve different wrestlers from pre-existing scripted feuds and storylines. Wrestlers portrayed villains, heroes, or less distinguishable characters in the scripted events that built tension and culminated in a wrestling match or series of matches.

=== IWL I - IWL vs. Hayafa Veachnon ===
IWL vs. Hayafa Veachnon
- Promotion: Israeli Wrestling League
- Date: 8 May 2013
- City: Tel Aviv
- Venue: Meimad Studios

IWL chronology
← Previous —	Next → IWL II

The inaugural performance of the IWL was held on 8 May 2013 at Meimad Studios in Ramat Hahayal in Tel Aviv, as a special episode HaYafa VeHaChnun, the Israeli version of Beauty and the Geek.

No.	Results	Stipulations
1	The Leopards (The Black Leopard & The White Leopard) defeated Da Style and Kronos	Tag team match
2	Ben Rozin defeated Ken Kerbis	Singles match
3	Shay Blanco defeated Da Shanell and Rixon Ruas	Triple threat match
4	Ben Rozin defeated Chris Korvinn, Da Style, Erik Crow, Idan Boulder, Ken Kerbis, Kronus, Leonardo, Psycho D, Rixon, Shay Blanco, The Arabian Horse, The Black Leopard, and The White Leopard	Battle royal for the inaugural IWL Heavyweight Championship

=== IWL II ===
IWL II
- Promotion: Israeli Wrestling League
- Date: 13 October 2014
- City: Rehovot
- Venue: Mabuza Hall
- Attendance: 140

IWL chronology
← Previous; IWL I	Next → IWL III

On 13 October 2014, IWL put on their second show, IWL II, their first independent show. It was held at Mabuza Hall in Rehovot and drew 140 people.

No.	Results	Stipulations
1	Ken Kerbis defeated Shay Blanco	Singles match
2	Kronos defeated Max Havok	Singles match
3	Sharon Palty defeated Yossi the Bull	Singles match
4	Ben Rozin (c) defeated The Black Leopard	Singles match for the IWL Heavyweight Championship
(c) / – the champion(s) heading into the match

=== IWL III ===
IWL III
- Promotion: Israeli Wrestling League
- Date: 17 November 2014
- City: Rehovot
- Venue: Mabuza Hall
- Attendance: 125

IWL chronology
← Previous; IWL II	Next → IWL IV

On 17 November 2014, IWL put on their third show, IWL III. It was held at Mabuza Hall in Rehovot and drew 125 people.

No.	Results	Stipulations
1	Kronos defeated De Shannel	#1 contendership tournament quarterfinal match
2	The Black Leopard vs. Da Style ended in a double disqualification	#1 contendership tournament quarterfinal match
3	The White Leopard defeated Shay Blanco	#1 contendership tournament quarterfinal match
4	Idan Boulder defeated Max Havok	#1 contendership tournament quarterfinal match
5	The White Leopard defeated Idan Boulder	#1 contendership tournament semifinal match
6	The White Leopard defeated Kronos	#1 contendership tournament final match
7	Iceman Rozin (c) defeated Ken Kerbis	Singles match for the IWL Heavyweight Championship
(c) / – the champion(s) heading into the match

Quarterfinals
Kronos
De Shannel
The Black Leopard	DCO
Da Style
The White Leopard
Shay Blanco
Idan Boulder
Max Havok

Semifinals
Kronos
BYE
The White Leopard
Idan Boulder

Final
Kronos
The White Leopard

=== IWL IV ===
IWL IV
- Promotion: Israeli Wrestling League
- Date: 5 May 2015
- City: Rehovot
- Venue: Mabuza Hall
- Attendance: 110

IWL chronology
← Previous; IWL III	Next → IWL V

On 5 May 2015, IWL put on their fourth show, IWL IV. It was held at Mabuza Hall in Rehovot and drew 110 people.

No.	Results	Stipulations
1	The Black Leopard defeated The Chinese	Singles match
2	Kronos defeated The Black Leopard	Singles match
3	Ken Kerbis & Max Havok defeated Idan Boulder & Shay Blanco	Tag team match
4	Rixon Ruas defeated De Shanell	Singles match
5	Iceman Rozin (c) defeated The White Leopard	Singles match for the IWL Heavyweight Championship
(c) / – the champion(s) heading into the match

=== IWL V ===
IWL V
- Promotion: Israeli Wrestling League
- Date: 1 June 2015
- City: Rehovot
- Venue: Mabuza Hall
- Attendance: 90

IWL chronology
← Previous; IWL IV	Next → IWL VI

On 1 June 2015, IWL put on their fifth show, IWL V. It was held at Mabuza Hall in Rehovot and drew 90 people.

No.	Results	Stipulations
1	The Leopards (The Black Leopard & The White Leopard) defeated Da Style and Kronos	Tag team match
2	Rixon Ruas defeated Udi Fitness	Singles match
3	Idan Boulder & Shay Blanco defeated Gilad & Guy	Tag team match
4	Psycho D defeated Tal Bar-On	Singles match
5	Iceman Rozin (c) defeated Ken Kerbis and Max Havok	Triple threat match for the IWL Heavyweight Championship
(c) / – the champion(s) heading into the match

=== IWL VI ===
IWL VI
- Promotion: Israeli Wrestling League
- Date: 17 August 2015
- City: Rehovot
- Venue: Mabuza Hall
- Attendance: 160

IWL chronology
← Previous; IWL V	Next → IWL VII

On 17 August 2015, IWL put on their sixth show, IWL VI. It was held at Mabuza Hall in Rehovot and drew 160 people.

No.	Results	Stipulations
1	Tal Bar-On defeated Udi Fitness	Singles match
2	Psycho D defeated Rixon Ruas	Singles match
3	The Candy Crushers (Idan Boulder & Shay Blanco) defeated Ken Kerbis & Sharon Palty	Tag team match
4	The White Leopard defeated Amit Oren	Singles match
5	The Black Leopard defeated Da Style	Career vs. Career match
6	Max Havok defeated Iceman Rozin (c)	Singles match for the IWL Heavyweight Championship
(c) / – the champion(s) heading into the match

=== IWL VII ===
IWL VII
- Promotion: Israeli Wrestling League
- Date: 12 October 2015
- City: Rehovot
- Venue: Mabuza Hall
- Attendance: 150

IWL chronology
← Previous; IWL VI	Next → IWL VIII

On 12 October 2015, IWL put on their seventh show, IWL VII. It was held at Mabuza Hall in Rehovot and drew 150 people.

No.	Results	Stipulations
1	Sharon Palty defeated The Black Leopard, De Shanell, The White Leopard	Four-way match to determine the #1 contender to the IWL Heavyweight Championship
2	Pillar of Fire defeated Udi Fitness	Singles match
3	Rixon Ruas & Tal Bar-On defeated The Candy Crushers (Idan Boulder & Shay Blanco) & Guy Shaked	3 on 2 handicap match
4	Kronos (with Da Style) defeated The Chinese	Singles match
5	Max Havok (c) defeated Iceman Rozin	Singles match for the IWL Heavyweight Championship
(c) / – the champion(s) heading into the match

=== IWL VIII ===
IWL VIII
- Promotion: Israeli Wrestling League
- Date: 14 December 2015
- City: Rehovot
- Venue: Mabuza Hall
- Attendance: 160

IWL chronology
← Previous; IWL VII	Next → IWL IX

On 14 December 2015, IWL put on their either show, IWL VIII. It was held at Mabuza Hall in Rehovot and drew 160 people.

No.	Results	Stipulations
1	The Candy Crushers (Idan Boulder & Shay Blanco) defeated Rixon Ruas & Tal Bar-On	Tag team match
2	Pillar of Fire defeated Tomer Shalom	Singles match
3	The Leopards (The Black Leopard & The White Leopard) defeated De Shanell & Kronos (with Da Style)	Tag team match
4	Max Havok (c) vs. Sharon Palty ended in a no decision	Singles match for the IWL Heavyweight Championship
(c) / – the champion(s) heading into the match

=== IWL IX ===
IWL IX
- Promotion: Israeli Wrestling League
- Date: 14 March 2016
- City: Rehovot
- Venue: Mabuza Hall
- Attendance: 160

IWL chronology
← Previous; IWL VIII	Next → IWL X

On 14 March 2016, IWL put on their ninth show, IWL IX. It was held at Mabuza Hall in Rehovot and drew 160 people.

No.	Results	Stipulations
1	Candy Boulder defeated Rixon Ruas	Singles match
2	Tal Bar-On defeated Shay Crusher	Singles match
3	The SMS (Kronos & Udi Fitness) (with Da Style) defeated De Shanell & Pillar of Fire	Tag team match
4	The Black Leopard defeated The White Leopard	Singles match
5	Max Havok (c) defeated Iceman Rozin and Sharon Palty	Triple threat match for the IWL Heavyweight Championship
(c) / – the champion(s) heading into the match

=== IWL X ===
IWL X
- Promotion: Israeli Wrestling League
- Date: 25 April 2016
- City: Rehovot
- Venue: Mabuza Hall
- Attendance: 190

IWL chronology
← Previous; IWL IX	Next → IWL XI

On 25 April 2016, IWL put on their tenth show, IWL X. It was held at Mabuza Hall in Rehovot and drew 190 people.

No.	Results	Stipulations
1	De Shanell (with Hanania Tal) defeated Udi Fitness (with Da Style)	No holds barred match
2	Psycho D defeated Pillar of Fire	Singles match
3	Sharon Palty defeated The White Leopard by disqualification	Singles match
4	Kronos (with Da Style & Udi Fitness) defeated Yossi the Bul	Singles match
5	The Chinese defeated Guy Shaked	Singles match
6	The Candy Crushers (Candy Boulder & Shay Crusher) defeated Rixon Ruas & Tal Bar-On	2 out of 3 falls match
7	Hadar Horvitz defeated Ben Rozin	Singles match
8	The Black Leopard defeated Max Havok (c)	Singles match for the IWL Heavyweight Championship
(c) / – the champion(s) heading into the match

=== IWL XI ===
IWL XI
- Promotion: Israeli Wrestling League
- Date: 1 August 2016
- City: Rehovot
- Venue: Mabuza Hall
- Attendance: 130

IWL chronology
← Previous; IWL X	Next → IWL XII

On 1 August 2016, IWL put on their eleventh show, IWL XI. It was held at Mabuza Hall in Rehovot and drew 130 people.

No.	Results	Stipulations
1	Rixon Ruas & Tal Bar-On defeated The SMS (Kronos & Udi Fitness)	Tag team match
2	Psycho D defeated De Shanell	Singles match
3	The Candy Crushers (Candy Boulder & Shay Crusher) defeated Ben Rozin & Sharon Palty	Tag team match
4	Guy Shaked defeated Hadar Horvitz	Singles match
5	Ken Kerbis & Max Havok defeated The Leopards (The White Leopard & The Black Leopard)	Tag team match

=== IWL XII ===
IWL XII
- Promotion: Israeli Wrestling League
- Date: 3 January 2017
- City: Petah Tikva
- Venue: Mabuza Hall

IWL chronology
← Previous; IWL XI	Next → IWL XIII

On 3 January 2017, IWL put on their twelfth show, IWL XII. It was held at Mabuza Hall in Petah Tikva, their first show at the newly relocated hall. The main match of the evening was a 20-man battle royal to determine the #1 contender for the IWL Heavyweight Championship.

No.	Results	Stipulations
1	Ben Rozin defeated Hadar Horvitz	Singles match where the loser enters the battle royal as #1
2	Ken Kerbis defeated The White Leopard	Singles match for the twentieth spot in the battle royal
3	The SMS (Kronos & Udi Fitness) (with Da Style) defeated Rixon Ruas & Tal Bar-On	Tag team match for two spots in the battle royal
4	The Black Leopard (c) defeated Max Havok	Singles match for the IWL Heavyweight Championship
5	Shay Crusher defeated Pillar of Fire, Ben Rozin, Danino, Da Style, Guy Shaked, The White Leopard, The Chinese, Hadar Horvitz, Hanania Tal, Ken Kerbis, Kronos, Udi Fitness, Max Havok, Psycho D, Rixon Ruas, Sharon Paly, Tal Bar-On, TRX and Yuval Goldshmit	20-man battle royal to determine the #1 contender to the IWL Heavyweight Championship
(c) / – the champion(s) heading into the match

=== IWL XIII ===
IWL XIII
- Promotion: Israeli Wrestling League
- Date: 14 February 2017
- City: Petah Tikva
- Venue: Mabuza Hall

IWL chronology
← Previous; IWL XII	Next → IWL XIV

On 14 February 2017, IWL put on their thirteenth show, IWL XIII. It was held at Mabuza Hall in Petah Tikva.

No.	Results	Stipulations
1	Ben Rozin & Guy Shaked defeated Hadar Horvitz & Yudal Goldschmit	Tag team match
2	Ken Kerbis vs. Max Havok ended in a no contest	Singles match
3	The White Leopard defeated Yossi the Bull	Singles match
4	Rixon Ruas & Tal Bar-On defeated The SMS (Kronos & Udi Fitness) (with Da Style)	Tag team match
5	The Black Leopard defeated Shay Crusher	Singles match for the IWL Heavyweight Championship

=== IWL XIV ===
IWL XIV
- Promotion: Israeli Wrestling League
- Date: 6 April 2017
- City: Petah Tikva
- Venue: Mabuza Hall

IWL chronology
← Previous; IWL XIII	Next → IWL XV

On 6 April 2017, IWL put on their fourteenth show, IWL XIV. It was held at Mabuza Hall in Petah Tikva.

No.	Results	Stipulations
1	The White Leopard (with Psycho D) defeated Yuval Goldshmit	Singles match
2	Ben Rozin defeated Yehoram Landau	Singles match
3	Hadar Horvitz defeated Danino	Singles match
4	De Shanell & Max Havok defeated The SMS (Kronos & Udi Fitness) (with Da Style)	Tag team match
5	Yossi the Bull defeated Psycho D	Singles match
6	TRX defeated Hanania Tal	Singles match
7	The Black Leopard (c) defeated Robbie E	Singles match for the IWL Heavyweight Championship
(c) / – the champion(s) heading into the match

=== Rage Megashow - IWL/LAW Main Show ===
Rage Megashow
- Promotion(s): Israeli Wrestling League; Los Angeles Wrestling
- Date: 9 July 2017
- City: Tel Aviv
- Venue: Drive in Arena
- Attendance: 1,000

On 9 July 2017 The Rage Megashow, was jointly produced by IWL and Los Angeles Wrestling, in an event that drew close to a 1,000 people. It took the Drive-In Arena in Tel Aviv hosted the largest wrestling show in Israel in over 20 years, known as the Rage Megashow. The show featured the return of Kevin Von Erich (with his sons Ross and Marshall) Tatanka and Marty Jannetty to Israel. Other international stars included Bad Bones, David Starr, and Jurn Simmons. Four of the matches at the Rage Megashow included IWL wrestlers.

No.	Results	Stipulations
1^{P}	Rixos Ruas defeated Ben Rozin	Singles match
2^{P}	Tal Bar-On defeated Psycho D	Singles match
3^{P}	Max Havok defeated Ken Kerbis	Singles match
4	The Leopards (The White Leopard & The Black Leopard) defeated The Candy Crushers (Candy Boulder & Shay Crusher)	Tag team match
5	Jurn Simmons defeated David Starr	Singles match
6	Joey Tylec vs. The Boss ended in a no contest	Singles match
7	Matt Sydal defeated Bad Bones	Singles match
8	Tatanka defeated Hakeem Waqur	Singles match
9	Tomer Offner defeated Kronos	Singles match
10	Kevin Von Erich, Ross Von Erich & Marshall Von Erich defeated Gery Roif, Jumping Lee & Marty Jannetty	Six-man tag team match
P / – the match was broadcast on the pre-show

=== IWL XV ===
IWL XV
- Promotion: Israeli Wrestling League
- Date: 24 August 2017
- City: Petah Tikva
- Venue: Mabuza Hall
- Attendance: 130

IWL chronology
← Previous; IWL XIV	Next → IWL XVI

On 24 August 2017, IWL put on their fifteenth show, IWL XV. It was held at Mabuza Hall in Petah Tikva, and drew 130 people.

No.	Results	Stipulations
1	Rixon Ruas defeated Yuval Goldshmit	Singles match
2	Tal Bar-On defeated Guy Shaked	Singles match
3	Psycho D defeated Hadar Horvitz	Singles match
4	Lior Libman defeated Ken Kerbis	Singles match
5	The Leopards (The White Leopard & The Black Leopard) (c) defeated The Candy Crushers (Candy Boulder & Shay Crusher)	Tag team match for the IWL Heavyweight Championship
(c) / – the champion(s) heading into the match

=== IWL XVI ===
IWL XVI
- Promotion: Israeli Wrestling League
- Date: 8 October 2017
- City: Petah Tikva
- Venue: Mabuza Hall
- Attendance: 140

IWL chronology
← Previous; IWL XV	Next → IWL XVII

On 8 October 2017, IWL put on their sixteenth show, IWL XVI. It was held at Mabuza Hall in Petah Tikva, and drew 140 people.

No.	Results	Stipulations
1	Shay Crusher defeated Yonatan 2.0	Main event qualifying match
2	Ben Rozin defeated Yuval Goldshmit	Main event qualifying match
3	Rixon Ruas defeated Psycho D	Main event qualifying match
4	Hadar Horvitz defeated Udi Fitness	Main event qualifying match
5	The White Leopard defeated Tal Bar-On	Main event qualifying match
6	Guy Shaked & Ken Kerbis defeated Lior Libman & Yehoram Landau	Tag team match
7	Rixon Ruas defeated The Black Leopard (c), Ben Rozin, The White Leopard, Hadar Horvitz and Shay Crusher	IWL Heavyweight Championship six man elimination
(c) / – the champion(s) heading into the match

=== IWL XVII ===
IWL XVII
- Promotion: Israeli Wrestling League
- Date: 13 December 2017
- City: Petah Tikva
- Venue: Mabuza Hall
- Attendance: 160

IWL chronology
← Previous; IWL XVI	Next → IWL XVIII

On 13 December 2017, IWL put on their seventeenth show, IWL XVII. It was held at Mabuza Hall in Petah Tikva, and drew 160 people. In November 2017, the IWL announced that Ross Von Erich and Marshall Von Erich will both be wrestling at IWL XVII.

No.	Results	Stipulations
1	Tal Bar-On defeated Yuval Goldshmit	Singles match
2	Hadar Horovitz & Kronos (with Hanania Tal) defeated The SMS (Ben Rozin & Udi Fitness)	Tag team match
3	The Candy Crushers (Candy Boulder & Shay Crusher) defeated Guy Shaked & Ken Kerbis	Tag team match
4	Rixon Ruas (c) defeated Psycho D	Strap match for the IWL Heavyweight Championship
5	The Von Erichs (Marshall von Erich & Ross von Erich) (c) defeated The Leopards (The White Leopard & The Black Leopard)	Tag team match for the IWR Tag Team Championship
(c) / – the champion(s) heading into the match

=== IWL XVIII ===
IWL XVIII
- Promotion: Israeli Wrestling League
- Date: 22 March 2018
- City: Petah Tikva
- Venue: Mabuza Hall
- Attendance: 130

IWL chronology
← Previous; IWL XVII	Next → IWL XIX

On 22 March 2018, IWL put on their eighteenth show, IWL XVIII. It was held at Mabuza Hall in Petah Tikva, and drew 130 people.

No.	Results	Stipulations
1	Tal Bar-On defeated Ken Kerbis	Singles match
2	The SMS (Ben Rozin & Udi Fitness) (with Da Style) defeated Hanania Tal & Kronos	Tag team match
3	Guy Shaked defeated Yuval Goldshmit	Singles match
4	The Candy Crushers (Candy Boulder & Shay Crusher) defeated Max Havok & Yehoram Landau	Tag team match
5	Amit Magnezi & Ori Avram defeated Daniel Kutchkin & Max Stranger	Tag team match
6	Rixon Ruas (c) defeated The Black Leopard	Singles match for the IWL Heavyweight Championship
(c) / – the champion(s) heading into the match

=== IWL XIX ===
IWL XIX
- Promotion: Israeli Wrestling League
- Date: 27 June 2018
- City: Petah Tikva
- Venue: Mabuza Hall

IWL chronology
← Previous; IWL XVIII	Next → IWL XX

On 27 June 2018, IWL put on their nineteenth show, IWL XIX. It was held at Mabuza Hall in Petah Tikva.

No.	Results	Stipulations
1	Tal Bar-On defeated Ken Kerbis and The White Leopard	Triple threat match
2	Yuval Goldshmit defeated The Black Leopard	Singles match
3	Amit Magnezi defeated Yehoram Landau	Singles match
4	The Candy Crushers (Candy Boulder & Shay Crusher) defeated Amud Ha'Esh & Guy Shaked	Tag team match
5	Hadar Horovitz defeated Daniel Kutchkin	Singles match
6	Rixon Ruas (c) defeated Tal Bar-On	Singles match for the IWL Heavyweight Championship
(c) / – the champion(s) heading into the match

=== IWL XX ===
IWL XX
- Promotion: Israeli Wrestling League
- Date: 26 August 2018
- City: Petah Tikva
- Venue: Mabuza Hall
- Attendance: 170

IWL chronology
← Previous; IWL XIX	Next → IWL XXI

On 26 August 2018, IWL put on their twentieth show, IWL XX. It was held at Mabuza Hall in Petah Tikva, and drew 170 people. Oded Paz, an actor best known in Israel for his role in Israeli series HaPijamot, was the General Manager of the event and participated in the Battle Royal.

No.	Results	Stipulations	Times
1	Guy Shaked defeated Amit Magnezi, Aviv Erad, Daniel Kutchkin, Danino, Edan Nissen, Hadar Horovitz, Hanania Tal, Ken Kerbis, Max Stranger, Oded Paz, Ori Avraham, Ori Gold, Shay Crusher, The White Leopard, TRX, Udi Fitness and Yehoram Landau	18-man Battle Royal match	—
2	Samson (with Oded Paz) defeated Max Havok	Singles match	—
3	Kronos defeated Ben Rozin (with Da Style)	Singles match	—
4	Rixon Ruas (c) defeated Tal Bar-On	Singles match for the IWL Heavyweight Championship	—
5	Haim Gozali defeated The Black Leopard by KO	Singles match	0:20
(c) / – the champion(s) heading into the match

== IWL Heavyweight Championship ==
IWL Heavyweight Championship
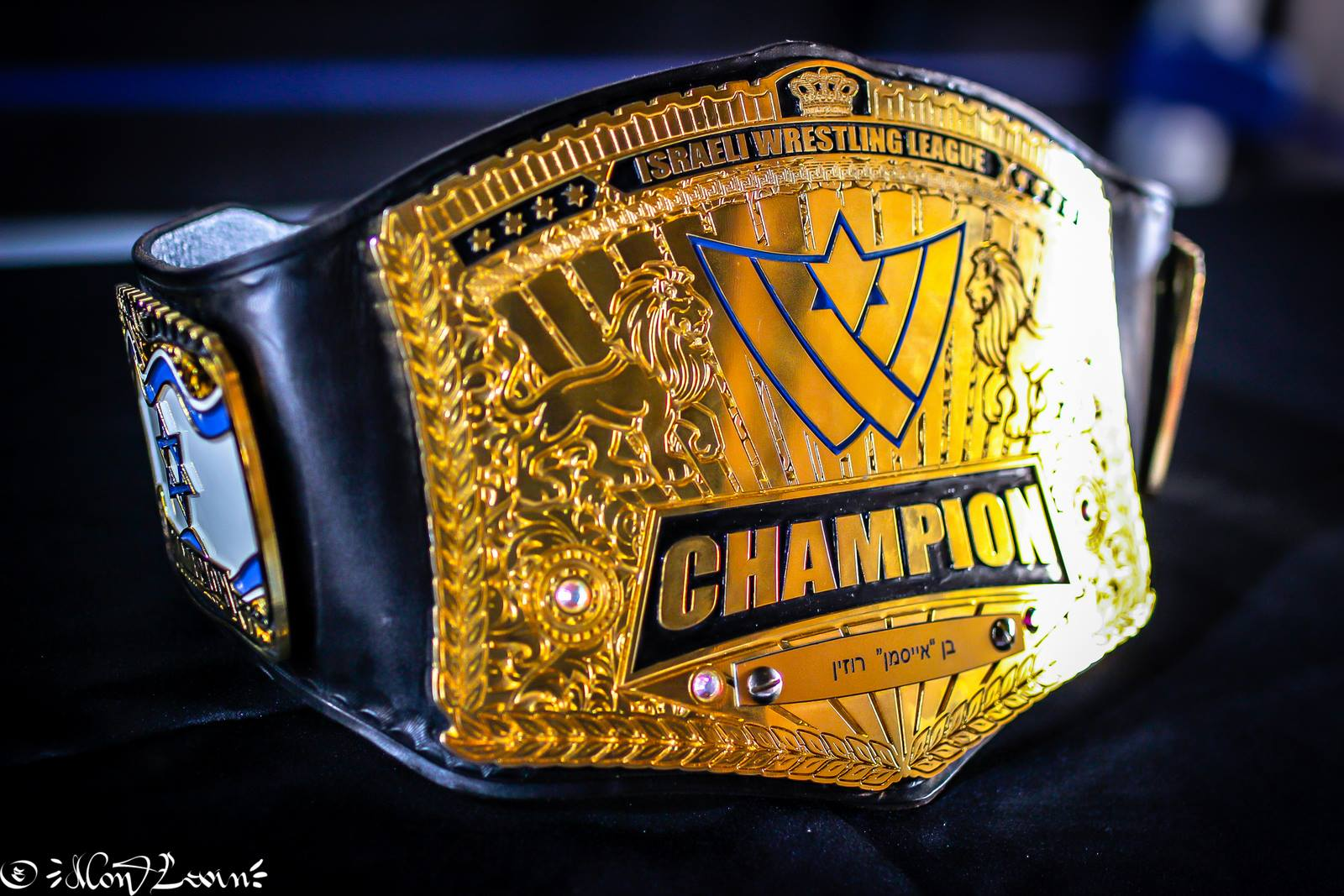

Details
- Promotion: Israeli Wrestling League
- Date established: 8 May 2013
- Current champion: Rixon Ruas
- Date won: 8 October 2017
Statistics
- First champion: Ben "Iceman" Rozin
- Longest reign: Ben "Iceman" Rozin (831 days)
- Shortest reign: Rixon Ruas (3,241+ days)

Key
No.	Overall reign number
Reign	Reign number for the specific champion
Days	Number of days held
+	Current reign is changing daily

No.	Champion	Championship change			Reign statistics		Notes	Ref.
No.	Champion	Date	Event	Location	Reign	Days	Notes	Ref.
1	Ben "Iceman" Rozin	8 May 2013	IWL I	Tel Aviv	1	831	15 man battle royal to crown the first champion	
2	Max Havok	17 August 2015	IWL VI	Rehovot	1	252		
3	The Black Leopard	25 April 2016	IWL X	Rehovot	1	531		
4	Rixon Ruas	8 October 2017	IWL XVI	Petah Tikva	1	3,241+	6 man elimination match	

== See also ==
- Professional wrestling in Israel
