= IPWA =

IPWA or IPWA Championship may refer to:

- Independent Professional Wrestling Alliance - An American independent professional wrestling promotion that held events in the Mid-Atlantic and Southeastern United States
  - IPWA Heavyweight Championship (United States)
  - IPWA Tag Team Championship
  - IPWA Light Heavyweight Championship
- Israeli Pro Wrestling Association - An independent wrestling promotion, operating from Israel
  - IPWA Heavyweight Championship (Israel)
