= IWL =

IWL may refer to:

- Industriewerke Ludwigsfelde
- International Workers League (Fourth International)
- International Wrestling League
- Israeli Wrestling League
- Indian Women's League
- Intentional weight loss
