= WCCW Middle Eastern Championship =

Details
- Promotion: World Class Championship Wrestling
- Date established: August 7, 1985
- Date retired: April 1986
Statistics
- First champion(s): Mike Von Erich
- Final champion(s): Mike Von Erich
- Most reigns: Mike Von Erich (1)

The WCCW Middle Eastern Championship was a short-lived professional wrestling championship promoted by World Class Championship Wrestling (WCCW). It was a minor championship, created for and only defended during WCCW's tours of Israel and was never defended in the United States. Mike Von Erich defeated Gino Hernandez, in what was billed as the finals of a tournament, but in reality there was no tournament leading up to the title match on August 7, 1985. The championship was abandoned in 1987, never mentioned after Mike Von Erich's death. As it is a professional wrestling championship, it is won not by actual competition, but by a scripted ending to a match. (Note: Hornbaker (2016) p. 550: "Professional wrestling is a sport in which match finishes are predetermined. Thus, win–loss records are not indicative of a wrestler's genuine success based on their legitimate abilities – but on now much, or how little they were pushed by promoters")

== Title history ==
Key
No.	Overall reign number
Reign	Reign number for the specific champion
Days	Number of days held

No.	Champion	Championship change			Reign statistics		Notes	Ref.
No.	Champion	Date	Event	Location	Reign	Days	Notes	Ref.
1	Mike Von Erich	August 7, 1985	WCCW Israeli Tour	Tel Aviv, Israel	1	(Note: The exact date the championship was abandoned is unknown, which means the title reign lasted between 633 and 662 days.)	Defeated Gino Hernandez in the finals of a tournament	
—	Deactivated	April 1987	—	—	—	—	Championship abandoned by WCCW	

== See also ==
- Professional wrestling in Israel
