= Rafael Halperin =

Israeli professional wrestler

Rafael Halperin רפאל הלפרין
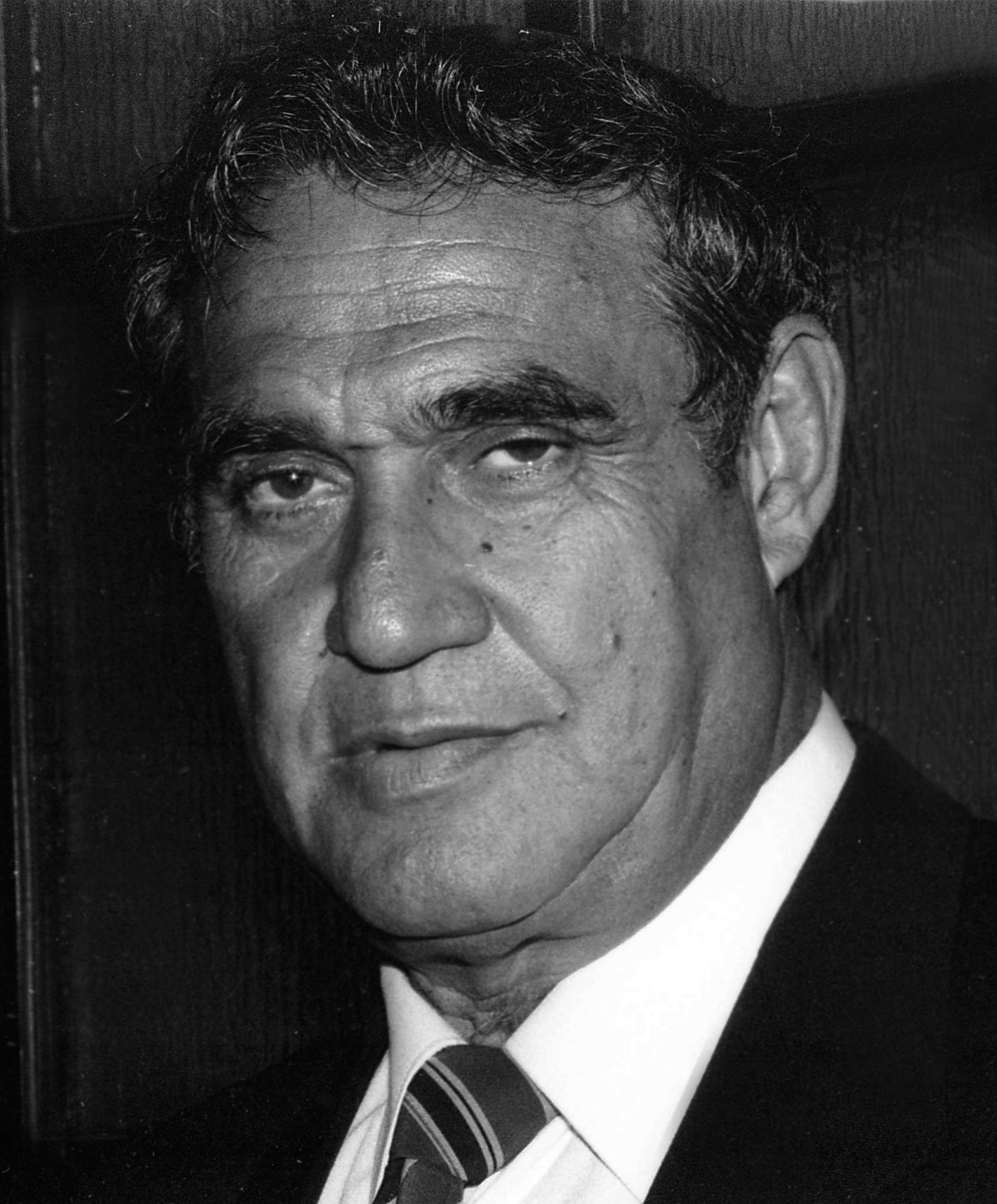
- Rafael Halperin in 1984

Personal information
- Born: 1924 Vienna, Austria
- Died: 20 August 2011 (aged 86–87) Bnei Brak, Israel

Professional wrestling career
- Ring name: Rafael Halperin
- Billed height: 5 ft 8 in (1.73 m)
- Billed weight: 214 lb (97 kg)
- Billed from: Israel
- Debut: 1952
- Retired: September 20, 1973

Rafael Halperin (Hebrew: רפאל הלפרין; 1924 – 20 August 2011) was an Austrian-born Israeli Orthodox rabbi, businessman, athlete, professional wrestler, and bodybuilder.

== Biography ==
Halperin was born in Vienna to Austrian Jewish parents in 1924. In 1933, at the age of 9, he and his family immigrated to Mandatory Palestine. The Halperin family moved to Bnei Brak the following year, and Rafael studied in Haifa and Jerusalem as a teenager. He also excelled in several athletic pursuits, including weightlifting and karate. He entered competitions and became the national champion in karate, boxing, and bodybuilding. In 1950, Halperin organized Israel's first "Mr. Israel" bodybuilders competition. He was also a skilled diamond cutter. He was a brother of famed philanthropist Rabbi Nachum Halpern.

== Professional wrestling career ==
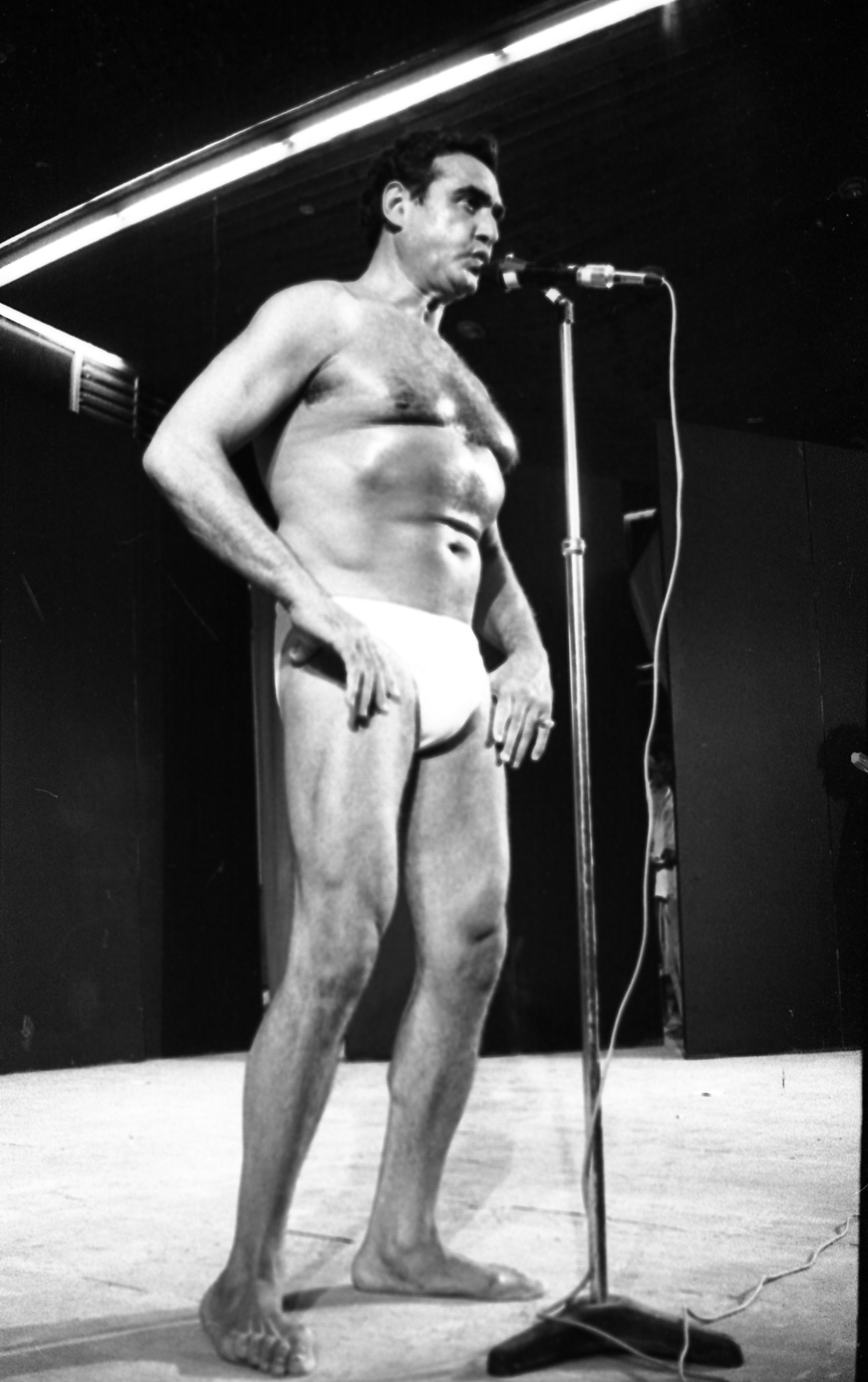
Halperin in 1973

Halperin decided that he wanted to open a chain of athletic facilities, so he began wrestling professionally to earn the necessary money. His career took him to the United States, where he was reported to have won 159 consecutive matches. In 1954, Toots Mondt signed him up as a wrestler. In his matches, he wore a blue and white costume emblazoned with the Jewish star. He worked for Vince McMahon Sr.'s Capitol Wrestling. In America he fought as “Mr. Israel” and "The Rasslin’ Rabbi," and won 159 consecutive bouts. He refused to follow the “scripts” used in professional wrestling and declared that he “came to America to wrestle representing the State of Israel and the Jewish people and could not fake or be phony.”

He earned the displeasure of some promoters and fellow wrestlers because he treated his matches as legitimate athletic contests rather than a scripted performance. He refused to yield, however, as he felt that he was upholding the dignity of his country. He also wrestled as a face (fan favorite), refusing to break any rules, for the same reason.

Halperin continued to wrestle in the United States and Canada into the 1960s. During this time, he faced such opponents as Antonino Rocca while competing for Capitol Wrestling. After Rocca canceled three times, the two finally met at Laurel Gardens in Newark, New Jersey, before 15,000 fans. The match went back and forth but ended in a draw.

His top triumphs were over Lu Kim, Lord Carlton, Zebra Kid and Steve Stanlee.

He later returned to Israel, where he is credited with popularizing professional wrestling in Israel.

His most well known matches in Israel were against Achmad Fuad and the "Jordanian Tiger" Abu Antar. The match with Fuad took place on 18 June 1966 in front of 6,000 fans at the Bloomfield Stadium and caused the police to use tear gas after a big riot broke out immediately after Fuad attacked the victorious Halperin. Apparently it was a staged act, but Halperin had not informed anyone in advance. The match with Abu Antar took place on September 20, 1973, and was the most successful local wrestling match seen in the country, as the Yad Eliyahu Arena was sold out to witness Halperin defeat the "Jordanian Tiger". This was Halperin's last match and after he retired from professional wrestling, he started to study karate and mixed martial arts in Japan.

== Business career ==
Rabbi Rafael Halperin

After retiring from wrestling, Halperin fulfilled his dream of opening a chain of gyms. He went on to earn a rabbinical degree and wrote several religious books as well as an encyclopedia and a weight-loss guide. During the Yom Kippur War, he served in the Israel Defense Forces. Halperin also founded a chain of 120 optical centers, selling glasses at affordable prices. In 2008, he and his wife Bertie decided to divide the optical business among their five children.

Because of his orthodox Jewish beliefs, he was opposed to businesses operating on Shabbat. To combat this "desecration" of the holy day, Halperin led an initiative to create a credit card containing a chip that renders it inoperable on Saturday. It was also designed not to function in stores known to operate on Shabbat.

== Death ==
Halperin died of cancer on 20 August 2011 at age 87.

== Published works ==
- Arena of My Life (autobiography) [Hebrew]

== See also ==
- List of Jewish professional wrestlers
