= Tomer Shalom =

Israeli professional wrestler

Tomer Shalom תומר שלום
Personal information
- Born: Holon, Israel

Professional wrestling career
- Ring name(s): Tomer Shalom; Jean-Pierre Goulet; Goliath Ayala; Tomer Syd; Tomer Time
- Billed height: 6 ft 2 in (188 cm)
- Billed weight: 255 lb (116 kg)
- Trained by: Rob Fuego
- Debut: 2010

Tomer Shalom (Hebrew: תומר שלום; born Tomer Sidi) is an Israeli professional wrestler. He officially debuted in 2010 and was trained by Rob Fuego in Canada.

== Early life ==
Born in Holon, Israel, Sidi grew up in Tel Aviv. In 2010, after completing his service in the Israeli Defence Forces, Sidi moved to Canada in order to begin his training to become a professional wrestler.

== Professional wrestling career ==
After arriving in Canada in 2010, Sidi first went to both Calgary and Winnipeg before ultimately winding up at Squared Circle Wrestling where he was trained by Rob Fuego.

On November 1, 2012 Tomer returned to Israel to wrestle for the first time and wrestled Lior Libman at Israeli Pro Wrestling Association's Wrestling In The Rain event. Two days later Sidi made his All Wrestling Organization debut at a house show. The following week he wrestled for AWO at their Face Off event.

On March 23, 2014 Sidi while wrestling for Crossfire Wrestling won the CW Heavyweight Championship, which he held for 259 days.

On December 10, 2015, Sidi returned to Israel at the Ultimate Wrestling Israel event UWI Showdown, but was eliminated in the quarter-finals of the UWI Heavyweight Championship tournament. Four days later, Sidi wrestled his first match for the Israeli Wrestling League at the IWL VIII event. Three weeks later, Sidi again wrestled for Ultimate Wrestling Israel.

On March 13, 2016 while wrestling for Victory Commonwealth Wrestling as Goliath Ayala, Sidi won his second title, the VCW Openweight Title, during their 4th Annual Iron Man Rumble. During Sidi's reign VCW was renamed to Hogtown Pro Wrestling and the belt renamed the HPW Openweight Title. In October 2016, Sidi lost in the final match of the tournament to crown the new HPW Heavyweight Champion. Sidi ultimately lost the title on January 29, 2017.

On August 7, 2017 Sidi made his WWE debut, filling in for Curtis Axel, under the name Jean-Pierre Goulet, and billed from Quebec City. in a match which he lost to Jason Jordan. During the match held in Canada, local wrestling fans recognizing Sidi began chanting "Tomer, Tomer, Tomer". The reaction from the fans caught the attention of the WWE, and following the match, Sidi was offered a tryout by the WWE. The WWE had previously expressed interest in him wrestling for their NXT brand, however they ran into visa issues.

== Championships and accomplishments ==
- Crossfire Wrestling
  - CW Heavyweight Championship (1 time)
- Pro Wrestling Illustrated
  - Ranked No. 464 of the top 500 singles wrestlers in the PWI 500 in 2017
- Victory Commonwealth Wrestling
  - VCW Openweight Championship (2 time)

== See also ==
- List of Jewish professional wrestlers
