= Joey Daddiego =

American former professional wrestler

Personal information
- Born: New York City, New York, United States

Professional wrestling career
- Ring name(s): Jay Diesel; J. Diesel; Joey Daddiego
- Billed height: 5 ft 9 in (1.75 m)
- Billed weight: 229 lb (104 kg)
- Debut: 2012
- Retired: 2017

Joey Daddiego is an American former professional wrestler best known for his time in Ring of Honor.

== Professional wrestling career ==
=== Ring of Honor (2014–2018) ===
On April 8, 2014, Daddiego made his debut at Ring Of Honor under the name Jay Diesel at the event ROH Future Of Honor #1, in a losing effort to Jay Lethal in a Proving Ground match. On November 22, 2014 Diesel grouped the House of Truth by teaming with Jay Lethal as they were defeated by The Briscoes in the Semi Finals of Tag Wars. On January 3, 2015 Diesel was defeated by Will Ferrara in the First Round of the Top Prospect Tournament. On February 11, 2017, Joey Daddiego turned face as he teamed with Will Ferrara and Cheeseburger as they defeated Brian Johnson, Matt Sells & Plunkett The Ogre.
