= Ultimate Wrestling Israel =

- Acronym: UWI
- Founded: 2015
- Style: Professional wrestling

Ultimate Wrestling Israel (UWI), the fourth wrestling federation in Israel was founded in November 2015. The UWI currently has one belt, the UWI Shomer Shabbos Heavyweight Championship, previously known as the UWI Heavyweight Championship until February 2017.

== UWI Shomer Shabbos Heavyweight Championship ==
UWI Heavyweight Championship crowned its first champion on 5 March 2016. On 1 February 2017 it was renamed to the UWI Shomer Shabbos Heavyweight Championship.

=== Original tournament ===
UWI Shomer Shabbos Heavyweight Championship

Details
- Promotion: Ultimate Wrestling Israel
- Date established: 5 March 2016
- Current champion(s): Lior Ben-David
- Date won: 12 July 2017

Other name(s)
- UWI Heavyweight Championship (5 March 2016 - 1 February 2017)
Statistics
- First champion(s): Ray Noceros

The tournament to crown the original holder of the UWI Heavyweight Championship was held over the source of three separate shows. 10 December 2015 saw the quarterfinals at UWI Showdown. On 7 January 2016 at UWI Gold Rush, there were the semifinals of the tournament. The finals were held on 5 March 2016 at UWI There Can Only Be One.

Match	Results
UWI Heavyweight Championship tournament quarterfinals
1	Hellboy beat Kraken
2	The Boss beat Yaniv Sniper
3	Ray Noceros beat Tomer Shalom
4	Udi M beat Yagi San
UWI Heavyweight Championship tournament semifinals
1	The Boss beat Lev Bar-Tera by disqualification
2	Ray Noceros beat Mad Zenzero and Udi M (three way match)
UWI Heavyweight Championship tournament finals
1	Ray Noceros beat The Boss

=== Reigns ===
Key
No.	Overall reign number
Reign	Reign number for the specific champion
Days	Number of days held
+	Current reign is changing daily

No.	Champion	Championship change			Reign statistics		Notes	Ref.
No.	Champion	Date	Event	Location	Reign	Days	Notes	Ref.
1	Ray Noceros	5 March 2016	UWI There Can Only Be One	Netanya	1	330		
2	Mad Zenzero	29 January 2017	N/A	Bat Yam	1	7		
3	Erez Birenboim	5 February 2017	N/A	Tel Aviv	1	22		
4	Ray Noceros	27 February 2017	N/A	Tel Aviv	2	14		
5	Jonathan Barak	13 March 2017	N/A	Jaffa	1	7		
6	Mad Zenzero	20 March 2017	N/A	Jaffa	2	114		
7	Lior Ben-David	12 July 2017	N/A	Beit Yanai	1	2,807+		

=== Combined reigns ===
†	Indicates the current champion

Rank	Champion	No. of reigns	Combined days
1	Lior Ben-David	1	2,807+
2	Ray Noceros	2	344
3	Mad Zenzero	2	121
4	Erez Birenboim	1	22
5	Jonatahn Barak	1	7

== See also ==
- Professional wrestling in Israel
