= Israeli Pro Wrestling Association =

Israeli professional wrestling promotion and school

- Acronym: IPWA
- Founded: 2001 (school); 2003 (first professional event)
- Style: Technical wrestling
- Headquarters: Netanya, Israel
- Founder: Gery Roif
- Owner: Gery Roif (2001–)
- Website: IPWA-WRESTLING.COM

Israeli Pro Wrestling Association is an independent wrestling promotion, operating from Israel.

== History ==
IPWA was founded on October 17, 2001 by Gery Roif and ran a few exhibition matches on national TV before holding the initial Summer Splash event in summer 2002. Roif was crowned its first champion after defeating Texas Wrestling Academy graduate Joey "The MOALM" Tylec in a televised match in the summer of 2003.

In April 2019, IPWA returned with an additional Passover Bash event, which featured Jay Lethal against David Starr. Originally, Lethal was scheduled to defend the ROH World Championship against Starr, but Lethal lost the title to Matt Taven in a Three-way ladder match, which included Marty Scurll as well at G1 Supercard event on April 6, 2019. The card also featured Gery Roif defending the IPWA Heavyweight Championship against Matt Sydal.

== IPWA special events ==
The IPWA events feature professional wrestling matches that involve different wrestlers from pre-existing scripted feuds and storylines. Wrestlers portrayed villains, heroes, or less distinguishable characters in the scripted events that built tension and culminated in a wrestling match or series of matches.

=== IPWA Passover Bash ===
IPWA Passover Bash
- Promotion: Israeli Pro Wrestling Association
- Date: 21 April 2019
- City: Lehavot Haviva
- Venue: Berale
- Attendance: 200

IPWA chronology
← Previous —	Next → IPWA Wrestling Party

On 21 April 2019, IPWA put on their return event, IPWA Passover Bash. It was held at Berale in Lehavot Haviva and drew 200 people.

No.	Results	Stipulations	Times
1	Lior Libman defeated Shay Blanco	Singles match	—
2	Max Havok defeated Hadar Horovitz	Singles match	—
3	Yuval Goldshmit defeated The Black Leopard and Idan Boulder	Triple threat match	—
4	Ariel Mor and Landau defeated Tal Bar-On and Idan Dagan	Tag team match	—
5	Matt Sydal defeated Rabbi Swissa (c)	Singles match for the IPWA Heavyweight Championship	—
6	Jay Lethal defeated David Starr	Singles match	25:18
(c) / – the champion(s) heading into the match

=== IPWA Wrestling Party ===
IPWA Wrestling Party
- Promotion: Israeli Pro Wrestling Association
- Date: 26 August 2019
- City: Lehavot Haviva
- Venue: Berale
- Attendance: ~80

IPWA chronology
← Previous; IPWA Passover Bash	Next → IPWA Cinema City Wrestling

On 26 August 2019, IPWA put on their second return event, IPWA Wrestling Party. It was held at Berale in Lehavot Haviva and drew approximately 80 people.

No.	Results	Stipulations	Times
1	Hadar Horovitz and Guy Landau defeated The Leopards (The Black Leopard and The White Leopard)	Tag team match	15:17
2	Idan Boulder defeated Ori Avram (with Amit Magnezi)	Singles match	6:09
3	Yuval Goldshmit defeated Rixon Ruas	Singles match	6:45
4	Shay Blanco defeated Lior Libman	No disqualification match	14:14
5	Gaya Glass defeated Nadia Sapphire	Singles match	4:55
6	Rabbi Swissa defeated Tye Clodd	Singles match	9:47
7	Yuval Goldshmit won by last eliminating The Black Leopard	21-man Battle royal match to determine the #1 contender to the IPWA Heavyweight Championship	30:52
8	Matt Sydal (c) defeated Yuval Goldshmit	Singles match for the IPWA Heavyweight Championship	16:41
(c) / – the champion(s) heading into the match

=== IPWA at Cinema City ===
IPWA Cinema City Wrestling
- Promotion: Israeli Pro Wrestling Association
- Date: 15 December 2019
- City: Ramat Hasharon
- Venue: Cinema City
- Attendance: 300

IPWA chronology
← Previous; IPWA Wrestling Party	Next → IPWA WrestleMitzvah

On 15 December 2019, IPWA put on their third return event, IPWA Cinema City Wrestling. It was held at Cinema City in Ramat Hasharon and drew over 300 people.

No.	Results	Stipulations	Times
1	Tal Bar On defeated Shay Blanco, Black Leopard, Ori Gold, Amit Magnezi	Fatal five way	15:17
2	White Leopard defeated Gal Barkay	Singles match	7:56
3	Idan Boulder and Rixon Ruas defeated "Iceman" Ben Rozin and Sharon "Platinum" Palty	Tag team match	10:10
4	Gaya Glass defeated Molly Spartan	Singles match	6:02
5	Darby Allin (c) defeated Rabbi Swissa	Singles match for the NEW Heavyweight Championship	2:02
6	Sammy Guevara defeated Yuval Goldshmit	Singles match	9:32
7	Hadar Horovitz defeated Ken Kerbis (Note: Lior Libman was injured few days before the event and therefore he was unable to compete in the match.)	Singles match	7:25
8	Matt Sydal (c) defeated "Bad Ass" Billy Gunn	Singles match for the IPWA Heavyweight Championship	14:31
(c) / – the champion(s) heading into the match

=== IPWA WrestleMitzvah ===
IPWA WrestleMitzvah
- Promotion: Israeli Pro Wrestling Association
- Date: 13 June 2022
- City: Ramat Hasharon
- Venue: Cinema City
- Attendance: 300

IPWA chronology
← Previous; IPWA at Cinema City	Next → —

On 13 June 2022, IPWA put on their fourth return event, IPWA WrestleMitzvah. Just like the last event, it was also held at Cinema City in Ramat Hasharon and drew over 300 people.

No.	Results	Stipulations
1	Oscar Vice & Tye Clodd defeated White Leopard and Guy Landau	Tag team match
2	Yarin Elkarif defeated Shay Blano, Samoa Rott, Daniel Kochkin, Aviv Arad, Yonatan Goldshmit, Adam Rose and Max Stranger	Battle Royal
3	Yarin Elkarif defeated Rabbi Swissa (Note: after winning battle royal, Yarin Elkarif is challenged by Rabbi Swissa for a retirement match.)	Singles match
4	Ken Kerbis defeated Leyton Buzzard	Singles match
5	Kacie defeated Harley Hudson	Singles match
6	Heidi Katrina defeated Mila Smidt	Singles match
7	Yuval Goldhsmit defeated Cara Noir	Singles match
8	Emersyn Jayne defeated Session Moth Martina	Singles match for the IPWA International Women's Championship

=== IPWA Ring Warriors ===
IPWA Ring Warriors
- Promotion: Israeli Pro Wrestling Association
- Date: 18 November 2025
- City: Tel Aviv
- Venue: ZOA House TLV
- Attendance: ~300

IPWA chronology
← Previous —	Next → IPWA Passover Bash

On 18 November 2025, IPWA held an event called IPWA Ring Warriors. It was also held at ZOA House TLV in Tel Aviv and drew approximately 300 people.

No.	Results	Stipulations	Times
1^{P}	Terry Barnett & Marmel defeated V-Dos & Max The Snake	Tag team match	—
2^{P}	Nadav Yona defeated Creek	Singles match	—
3	White Leopard defeated Ken Kerbis, Shay Crusher and Guy Shaked	Fatal four-way match	—
4	Lenny Levi defeated Ashke	Singles match	—
5	Lior Libman defeated Amazing Toper	Singles match	—
6	Ben Daniel defeated Omer Roth	Singles match	—
7	Spring Bros (Matan Katz & David Blade) defeated Oscar Vice & AJ Nevo	Tag team match	—
8	Dangerous E defeated Shoes	Singles match	—
9	"Massive" Barak Malloul defeated "LM Kaza" Liran Mizrahi	Singles match	—
10	Matan Esosa Erhabor defeated "The Hunter" Attila	Singles match	—
11	Shira Sinai defeated Christina The Razor	Singles match	—
12	Ariel Light & Arthur defeated Niv Barbunia & Bar Barina	Tag team match	—
13	It's Gal defeated Hadar Horwitz	Singles match	—
14	Julissa Mexa defeated Ludark	Singles match	10:10
15	Avizov (c) defeated Chris Masters	Singles match for the IPWA Heavyweight Championship	11:00
(c) / – the champion(s) heading into the match; P / – the match was broadcast on the pre-show

== Roster ==
=== Last known roster ===
- Rabbi Swissa/Shoes
- Avizov
- Arthur
- Yuval Goldshmit
- Yonatan Goldshmit
- Yahav "The Death" Havok
- Guy Shaked
- White Leopard
- Lior Libman
- Matan Esosa Erhabor
- Lenny Levi
- "Massive" Barak Malloul
- "LM Kaza" Liran Mizrahi
- "The Hunter" Attila
- Oscar Vice
- Adam Rabinovitz
- Ori Sankari
- Bar Barina
- Matan Katz
- David Blade
- Nadav Yona
- Ben Daniel
- AJ Nevo
- Dangerous E
- Shira Sinai

=== Alumni ===
- Aviv Maayan
- Tatanka
- "Bad Ass" Billy Gunn
- Little Guido
- Tomer Shalom
- Jay Lethal
- David Starr
- Matt Sydal
- Darby Allin
- Sammy Guevara
- Cara Noir
- Emersyn Jayne
- Nadia Sapphire
- Molly Spartan
- Chris Masters
- Julissa Mexa
- Ludark
- Diana Tano
- Lexa Valo

== IPWA Heavyweight Championship ==
IPWA Heavyweight Championship

Details
- Promotion: Israeli Pro Wrestling Association
- Date established: July 24, 2003
- Current champion: Amor Talby
- Date won: June 22, 2024
Statistics
- First champion: Gery Roif
- Most reigns: Gery Roif (6 times)
- Longest reign: Matt Sydal (1,968 days)
- Shortest reign: New York Rozenfeld (34 minutes)
- Oldest champion: Hawaii Allen (28 years)
- Youngest champion: Omry Balely (16 years)
- Heaviest champion: Tatanka (255 lb (116 kg))
- Lightest champion: Gery Roif (160 lb (73 kg))

The IPWA Heavyweight Championship is the only professional wrestling championship in the Israeli Pro Wrestling Association promotion. At the end of 2002, Israeli professional wrestler Gery Roif announced a match between himself and Joey "The Moalm" Tylec to determine the first IPWA Heavyweight Champion. The current champion is Amor Talby, who is in his first reign.

From the IPWA Heavyweight Championship's inception in 2003, there have been fifteen different title holders, combining for twenty championship reigns.

=== Reigns ===
Key
No.	Overall reign number
Reign	Reign number for the specific champion
Days	Number of days held

No.	Champion	Championship change			Reign statistics		Notes	Ref.
No.	Champion	Date	Event	Location	Reign	Days	Notes	Ref.
1	Gery Roif	July 24, 2003	N/A	Herzliya, Israel	1	215	Roif defeated Joey Tylec to become the inaugural champion.	
2	Nadav Arbel	February 24, 2004	IPWA Netanya Havoc	Netanya, Israel	1	<1	Arbel defeated Gery Roif in the semifinals of a tournament in which the championship was on the line in every match that the champion is in.	
3	Evgeny Lyder	February 24, 2004	IPWA Netanya Havoc	Netanya, Israel	1	49	Defeated Nadav Arbel in the same tournament's final.	
4	New York Rosenfeld	April 13, 2004	IPWA Passover Bash	Netanya, Israel	1	<1		
5	Gery Roif	April 13, 2004	IPWA Passover Bash	Netanya, Israel	2	84		
6	Joey Tylec	July 6, 2004	IPWA Summersplash	Netanya, Israel	1	296		
7	Gery Roif	April 28, 2005	IPWA Passover Bash	Netanya, Israel	3	203	This was a three-way match, also involving Hawaii Allen.	
8	Omry Balely	November 17, 2005	IPWA 5th Dimension Catch	Tel Aviv, Israel	1	103	This was a four-way match, also involving Hawaii Allen and Sharon Palty.	
9	Hawaii Allen	February 28, 2006	IPWA Holy Land Havoc	Tel Aviv, Israel	1	403		
—	Vacated	April 7, 2007	—	—	—	—	Hawaii Allen was stripped of the championship.	
10	Sharon Palty	June 9, 2007	N/A	Tel Aviv, Israel	1	704	Palty defeated Yossi The Bull in a tournament final to win the vacant championship.	
11	Yossi the Bull	May 13, 2009	IPWA Israeli Wrestling 2009	Tel Aviv, Israel	1	476		
—	Vacated	September 1, 2010	—	—	—	—	Yossi the Bull was stripped of the championship in September 2010.	
12	Rabbi Swissa	July 14, 2011	IPWA Summersplash	Netanya, Israel	4	399	Swissa defeated Lior Libman in the finals of an eight man tournament to win the vacant championship.	
13	Tatanka	August 16, 2012	IPWA Wrestling Supershow	Netanya, Israel	1	7		
—	Vacated	August 23, 2012	—	—	—	—	Tatanka was stripped of the championship after he couldn't defend it.	
14	Rabbi Swissa	August 23, 2012	IPWA Summer Splash	Netanya, Israel	5	151	Swissa defeated Ken Kerbis in the finals of a ten-men gauntlet match to win the vacant championship.	
15	Hellboy	January 21, 2013	IPWA Music and Wrestling	Tel Aviv, Israel	1	182		
—	Vacated	July 22, 2013	—	—	—	—	Hellboy was stripped of the championship.	
16	Lior Libman	September 7, 2013	IPWA Wrestling In The Dead Sea	Kalya, Israel	1	224	Libman defeated Leonardo to win the vacant championship.	
—	Deactivated	April 19, 2014	—	Jerusalem, Israel	—	—	The IPWA ceases promoting events on April 19, 2014.	
17	Rabbi Swissa	April 1, 2019	N/A	Netanya, Israel	6	20		
18	Matt Sydal	April 21, 2019	IPWA Passover Bash	Lehavot Haviva, Israel	1	1,968		
19	Avizov	September 9, 2024	IPWA New Generation	Netanya, Israel	1	651		
20	Amor Talby	June 22, 2026	IPWA Clash in Netanya	Netanya, Israel	1	26+	This was a three-way match, also involving Hof Betzalel.	

=== Combined reigns ===
†	Indicates the current champion

Rank	Champion	No. of reigns	Combined days
1	Matt Sydal	1	1,968
2	Gery Roif/Rabbi Swissa	6	1,072
3	Sharon Palty	1	704
4	Avizov	1	651
5	Yossi the Bull	1	476
6	Hawaii Allen	1	466
7	Joey Tylec	1	296
8	Lior Libman	1	223
9	Hellboy	1	182
10	Omry Balely	1	103
11	Evgeny Lyder	1	49
12	Tatanka	1	7
13	Amor Talby †	1	26+
14	Nadav Arbel	1	<1
14	New York Rosenfeld	1	<1

== IPWA Women's Championship ==
IPWA Women's Championship

Details
- Promotion: Israeli Pro Wrestling Association
- Date established: June 22, 2026
- Current champion: Shira Sinai
- Date won: June 22, 2026
Statistics
- First champion: Shira Sinai
- Youngest champion: Shira Sinai (29 years, 341 days)

The IPWA Women's Championship is the only professional wrestling women's championship in the Israeli Pro Wrestling Association promotion. At June 22, 2026, Shira Sinai defeated Finnish wrestler Lexa Valo to become the inaugural IPWA Women's Champion. The current champion is Shira Sinai, who is in her first reign.

=== Reigns ===
Key
No.	Overall reign number
Reign	Reign number for the specific champion
Days	Number of days held

No.	Champion	Championship change			Reign statistics		Notes	Ref.
No.	Champion	Date	Event	Location	Reign	Days	Notes	Ref.
1	Shira Sinai	June 22, 2026	IPWA Clash in Netanya	Netanya, Israel	1	26+	Sinai defeated Lexa Valo to become the inaugural champion.	

=== Combined reigns ===
†	Indicates the current champion

Rank	Champion	No. of reigns	Combined days
1	Shira Sinai †	1	26+

== See also ==
- Professional wrestling in Israel
- Sports in Israel
