= All Wrestling Organization =

Israeli professional wrestling promotion

- Acronym: AWO
- Founded: 2012
- Style: Professional wrestling
- Headquarters: Netanya
- Founder: Mahran Abdul Hai
- Owner: Mahran Abdul Hai (2012–current)
- Website: Official Website

All Wrestling Organization is an independent wrestling promotion in the Middle East, which has been operating in Israel since 2012.

== History ==
=== 2012 ===
AWO was founded at early June 2012 by Mahran Abdul Hai. The debut show, "WrestleFest", was held on June 21 in front of a sold-out crowd of 600 fans. The show was sponsored and broadcast by Panet. The main event of this show saw The Arabian Horse squaring off against Kronos in a match for the vacant AWO Championship in which The Arabian Horse won and became the first ever AWO Champion.

In July 2012, AWO held an event called "The Ramadan Rumble", its main event saw The Arabian Horse team with The White Leopard against Ken Kerbis & Kronos.

In September 2012, AWO held a show in Kafr Qasim, "Vengeance Day", in front of 400 fans. The main event was a triple threat match for the AWO Championship, between Da Style, Kronos and The Arabian Horse which saw The Arabian Horse emerge victorious and retaining his title.

At November 2012, Kronos defeated The Arabian Horse in a 20 seconds' worth of match at "Face Off". After the former had a successful title defense against Evgeny Lyder, the AWO General Manager, Mr. Saar Etinger, entered the arena and decided to reward Kronos with a title shot.

=== 2013 ===
January 2013 brought "No Man's Land" in front of 100+ fans in Tel Aviv. The event saw the AWO debuts of Iceman & Big Leo as they faced each other, and Kronos retaining the title after defeating The Arabian Horse in a Last Man Standing match.

"WrestleFest II" saw Evgeny Lyder becoming the top contender after winning a triangle TLC match, granting him a title bout VS The Arabian Horse, who in turn regained his title VS Kronos in this very show.

"WrestleChurch" brought upon the eventual title victory for Lyder, as well as his defeat in an impromptu rematch VS The Arabian Horse. He became the top contender once again after scoring the victory in a 12-men battle royal.

"SummerSalam" had Ken Kerbis and Rixon Ruas tearing the house down with Ruas emerging victorious and Da Style beating The Arabian Horse and becoming the champion.

"TLV Clash" was the second show bringing the organization back to Tel Aviv. It featured IWF heavyweight champion Ivan Markov teaming with Idan Boulder VS De Shanell and Kronus, with the latter team scoring the win as Boulder turned against his partner, laying him out with a chairshot. Evgeny Lyder scored the win VS Da Style and became the AWO champion for the second time, only to lose it later on in the evening to Chris Korvinn. In addition, Ataman made his AWO debut in an "open challenge" during which he defeated two wrestlers in a row, never once getting off his feet.

Autumn Fallout brought the AWO once again to Tel Aviv. The commentary was done live for the first time ever in Israel by Moty Aharonovich and Gordon. This time around Udi M & Max Von Punx showed they're here to stay as a tag team, sporting similar outfits and showcased their combined skills in the ring, overcoming White Leopard & Hellboy. Ataman gained another victory-this time over Adi Hurvitz - and increasing his victory streak to 3–0, and interfered for Ken Kerbis in the 6-way Israeli championship match, assisting Ken in becoming the inaugural title holder. Among other results, Chris Korvinn retained his AWO championship after defeating Da Style, and after being distracted by Big Leo, Idan Boulder ended up losing to Joe E. Legend in the final bout which tore the house down.

"Urban Hazzard" took place on December 29 in Tel Aviv. Y & R gained their third victory in a row after defeating Kronos & Da Shannell, who kept on disagreeing up to the point of Shannell costing his team the match. Ken Kerbis retained the AWO Israeli Title as he scored the win over Rixon Ruas. Big Leo was placed in charge of the Sniper/Idan Boulder match as a special guest referee which saw the latter emerging victorious, and Chris Korvinn defeated Da Style to retain the AWO championship in the first ever Lumberjack match in Israel.

=== 2014 ===
"The 11th Plague" took place in Jaffa on March 29, 2014. The card saw the Israeli championship change hands as Rixon Ruas defeated Ken Kerbis to become the new Israeli champion. The main event featured a 9-man battle royal for the AWO championship. Ken Kerbis was the last man standing and was crowned the new AWO champion.

"AWO Revolution" took place in Jaffa of April 26, 2014. The card included: In the opening match, Shay Blanco & Idan Boulder beat Da Style and a returning Da Shannell in a highly exciting match, Mad Zenzero beat Hellboy, Rixon Roas successfully defended his Israeli championship for the first time against Kronos who attacked him after the match ended, Ataman pinned "Blondevil" and AWO champion Ken Kerbis beat Adi Hurvitz and retained his title. After the match, Kronos attacked Kerbis and raised the AWO championship.

On May 29, 2014, the promotion made their debut show in Haifa, the show was taped and was broadcast on the Ego Total channel. "WrestleFest III" took place on June 26, 2014, and saw the debut of former WWE superstars Carlito and Chris Masters (who won the AWO championship), as well as the return of Ivan Markov as he faced the Ataman in a brutal hardcore match. This show was also broadcast on Ego Total as well as the main Ego channel.

The promotion ran a 2-day tour called "International Mayhem" which took place on the 5th and 6 December 2014. The first show took place in Kafr Qara and the second show in Jaffa, both shows featured wrestlers from 7 different countries.

=== 2015 ===
On January 15, 2015, the promotion returned to Jaffa for "In Your Face" which saw Chris Korvinn defends the AWO championship against Mad Zenzero in the main event.

On June 27, 2015, the promotion returned to Tira for 4th edition of "WrestleFest" which saw The Arabian Horse defeats Lev Bar-Tera for the vacant AWO championship. The event took place in the brand new AWO Arena.

"WrestleChurch 2" took place on July 19, 2015, at Kafr Yasif. Eyal Smiley won a battle royal to become the number 1 contender for the AWO championship which he later on won in the main event when he defeated The Arabian Horse in front of a crowd of over 200 fans.

On August 12, 2015, the promotion came back for another show in the AWO Arena at Tira, the show was called "Beatdown!" and it was showcased by the arrival of Chaos who came to defend his Union of European Wrestling Alliances European Heavyweight Championship against Mad Zenzero and Ray Noceros.

=== 2016 ===
After a long break the AWO return on March 23, 2016, with the "Extreme Rules" show that featured a Number 1 Contender's Match for the vacated AWO Championship to be held on the annual show "WrestleFest v", in that match Blondevil defeated his former tag team partner Goldman in a chairs match in order to face The Arabian Horse for the title.

"The 11th Commandment 2" took place on April 26, 2016, which featured the return of the Israeli Champion Adi Hurvitz and the debut of "The Volk" and Goldman defeats Hellboy in an extreme rules match in the main event.

"The Road To WrestleFest" Was held on May 23, 2016, where "The Arabian Horse" defeated "Rockstar" Adi Hurvitz in a tables match and Blondevil defeated Hellboy.

"Wrestlefest V" has taken place on June 28, 2016, where we saw Goldman win the Number 1 Contenders Match for the AWO Championship, The Volk beat "Rockstar" Adi Hurvitz to win the Israeli Championship & "Blondevil" beat "The Arabian Horse" to become the 3 times AWO Champion, the show had also the debut of A+ (a stable that consist the AWO Academy wrestlers CJ Chaos, Double B, Maor Raizeng, El Mystic, Johnny Light & Dean Arrow).

On July 27, 2016, the "AWO SummeRevolution" show took place where The Volk retained the Israeli Championship against "Rockstar" Adi Hurvitz in a rematch from "Wrestlefest V" and in the main event, the AWO Champion "Blondevil" & the number 1 contender for his title, Goldman has beaten The System (The Arabian Horse & Rockstar Adi Hurvitz), after the match A+ tried to attack The System where they got help from Black Mamba & Johnny Light (who turned against his friends).

On August 24, 2016, "AWO Survival" was and featured a double main event: The first there was an 8-man elimination tag team match between The System with Jessie Roy & Black Mamba against A+ where A+ won and got a place on the main roster & The Arabian Horse lost his power as the owner of the company to the active General Manager Rom Unger. The Second main event was the clash of 2 friends for the AWO Championship between "Blondevil" and Goldman, where after a hard-fought match, Goldman was able to win and the AWO Championship for his 1st time.

On September 13, 2016, "AWO Reboot" show took place which had the start of a tournament to name the new Number 1 Contender for the AWO Championship where in the 1st round Hellboy, Mr. M., Tyler Dawn & "Rockstar" Adi Hurvitz advanced to the semi-final and in the Main Event the newly crowned AWO Champion Goldman defended his title twice in a row against "The Arabian Horse", first in a last man standing match and then in a no disqualification match where he won both of them to retain his title. the show also featured the first ever Israeli live in-ring segment "The Office" hosted by "The System" ("The Arabian Horse" & "Rockstar" Adi Hurvitz).

On October 25, 2016, "AWO Vengeance Day" show took place which saw first the revealing of the AWO Co-General Manager Zlata Monson as part of "The Office" segment which ended with AWO Champion Goldman turning against all of his friends by attacking the AWO Israeli Champion The Volk. In the semifinals of the AWO Championship Number 1 Contender tournament Mr. M. beat "Rockstar" Adi Hurvitz and Tyler Dawn beat Hellboy to advance to the final where in the final Dawn tried to hit Mr. M. with a foreign object but got saved by his friend CJ Chaos and in the end Mr. M. won the tournament. the show also featured a grudge match between Jessie Roy and "The Arabian Horse" (a rivalry that started since AWO Survival) which Jessie Roy got the upper hand and won his match. In The Main Event for the first time ever there was a Champion Vs. Champion lumberjack match for the AWO Championship between the AWO Israeli Champion The Volk and the AWO Champion Goldman where Goldman used his experience and while the referee didn't noticed he hit The Volk with a low blow to win the match and retain his title with a promise to all the wrestlers that nobody is going to take the title away from him.

On October 26, 2016, the AWO Israeli Champion "The Volk" updated a video post where he told the AWO fans because of what happened in his match against AWO Champion Goldman, he got injuries in his back which make him vacate the AWO Israeli Championship.

=== 2017 ===
On January 24, 2017, AWO Legacy took place where it featured the breakdown of The System (The Arabian Horse & "Rockstar" Adi Hurvitz) after both of them accidentally attack each other in their match they fought backstage where Adi Hurvitz was injured by the Arabian Horse, the show also featured the return of Blondevil to the roster after 5 months of absence, Hellboy won the Israeli Championship & AWO Champion Goldman retained his title by defeating CJ Chaos.

On February 21, 2017, AWO WarZone took place with a double main event, the 1st one was a mask vs. mask match for the AWO Israeli Championship where Hellboy retain his title and made "The Black Mamba" be unmasked only to be revealed as former AWO Israeli Champion & Former AWO Champion Eyal Smiley and in the 2nd main event The Arabian Horse defeated The AWO Champion Goldman in a 20 minutes Iron Man Match with Blondevil as the special enforcer to the match to become the 6th time AWO Champion.

== Best of AWO Awards ==
=== Best of AWO 2016 Awards ===
On January 4, 2017, The AWO made a live event for all the fans which held for the 1st time ever in Israeli Wrestling a 2016 end of the year awards hosted by "The Arabian Horse" & "Rockstar" Adi Hurvitz. Afterward the ceremony the AWO owner Mahran Abdul-Hai gave another award to Gery Roif for being the pioneer and cornerstone of the Israeli wrestling. Afterward Abdul-Hai gave a message for all the AWO fans where he spoke about the future of the company and whats to come in 2017.

Award	Winner
Debut of the year	AWO academy known as A+
First time in Israeli Wrestling	Goldman & The Volk won together for the "Champion Vs. Champion" match from vengeance day
Surprise of the year	AWO Co-General Manager Rom Unger
Contract singing for the AWO Israeli Championship match between Hellboy, Black Mamba & "Rockstar" Adi Hurvitz which will take place in the coming AWO show "Legacy"
AWO moment of the year	AWO ring announcer Elad Avigan
AWO match of the year	Jessie Roy & "Rockstar" Adi Hurvitz for their match at "AWO Reboot"
Champion of the year	Current AWO Champion Goldman
AWO wrestler of the year	Jessie Roy

=== Best of AWO 2017 Awards ===
In January 2018, AWO hosted the Best of 2017 Awards

Award	Winner
Debut of the year	Blue Bar Kay
AWO moment of the year	AWO official Netanel attacks Jake Mayhem after the main event at "AWO Legacy".
AWO match of the year	The New System (Ben Barel, Kannon Payne & Rom Unger) vs. The FTS Army (The BlonDevil & The Arabian Horse) in 3 on 2 handicap match at "AWO Finish Line"
AWO wrestler of the year	Jake Mayhem

== List of AWO special events ==
=== 2012 events ===
Event	Date	City	Venue	Main event
AWO WrestleFest	June 21, 2012	Tira		
AWO The Ramadan Rumble	July 2012	Tira		
AWO Vengeance Day	September 2012	Kafr Qasim		
AWO Face Off	November 8, 2012	Qalansawe		

=== 2013 events ===
Event	Date	City	Venue	Main event
AWO No Man's Land	January 23, 2013	Tel Aviv		
AWO Heating Up	February 28, 2013	Kafr Bara		
AWO Northern Invasion	April 23, 2013	Shefa-'Amr		
AWO WrestleFest II	June 18, 2013	Tira		
AWO WrestleChurch	July 28, 2013	Kafr Yasif		
AWO SummerSalam	August 22, 2013	Majd al-Krum		
AWO TLV Clash	October 10, 2013	Tel Aviv		
AWO Autumn Fallout	November 21, 2013	Tel Aviv		
AWO Urban Attack	December 29, 2013	Tel Aviv		

=== 2014 events ===
Event	Date	City	Venue	Main event
AWO The 11th Plague	March 29, 2014	Jaffa		
AWO Revolution	April 26, 2014	Jaffa		
AWO Back To The North	May 29, 2014	Haifa		
AWO WrestleFest III	June 26, 2014	Tira		
AWO International Mayhem (day 1)	December 5, 2014	Kafr Qara		
AWO International Mayhem (day 2)	December 6, 2014	Jaffa		

=== 2015 events ===
Event	Date	City	Venue	Main event
AWO In Your Face	January 15, 2015	Jaffa		
AWO WrestleFest 4	June 27, 2015	Tira	AWO Arena	
AWO WrestleChurch 2	July 19, 2015	Kafr Yasif		
AWO Beatdown!	August 12, 2015	Tira	AWO Arena	

=== 2016 events ===
Event	Date	City	Venue	Main event
AWO Extreme Rules	March 23, 2016	Netanya		
The 11th Commandment 2Extreme	April 26, 2016	Netanya		
AWO The Road To WrestleFest	May 23, 2016	Netanya		
AWO Wrestlefest V	June 28, 2016	Netanya		
AWO AWO SummeRevolution	July 27, 2016	Netanya		
AWO Survival	August 24, 2016	Netanya		
AWO Reboot	September 13, 2016	Netanya		
AWO Vengeance Day	October 25, 2016	Netanya		

=== 2017 events ===
Event	Date	City	Venue	Main event
AWO Legacy	January 24, 2017	Netanya		
AWO WarZone	February 21, 2017	Netanya		Goldman (c) vs. The Arabian Horse in a 20 minutes Iron-Man match for the AWO Championship
AWO Unlimited	March 22, 2017	Netanya		The Arabian Horse (c) vs. Eyal Smiley for the AWO Championship
AWO Final Clash	April 26, 2017	Netanya		The Arabian Horse vs. Blondevil vs. Goldman vs. Eyal Smiley in a Fatal 4-Way match for the AWO Championship
AWO Academy Event	May 4, 2017	Netanya		Battle Royal for the #1 contendership for the AWO Israeli Championship
AWO Road to WrestleFest VI	May 15, 2017	Netanya		The Arabian Horse (c) and Blondevil vs. Goldman and Jessie Roy
AWO WrestleFest VI	June 5, 2017	Netanya		The Arabian Horse (c) vs. Adi Hurvitz in a Lumberjack match for the AWO Championship
AWO SummeRevolution	July 12, 2017	Netanya		The Arabian Horse (c) vs. Jessie Roy for the AWO Championship
AWO Academy eVent	July 20, 2017	Netanya		The Arabian Horse (c) vs. Jessie Roy for the AWO Championship
AWO Survival	August 16, 2017	Netanya		The Arabian Horse (c) vs. Jessie Roy for the AWO Championship
AWO Reboot	September 13, 2017	Netanya		Jessie Roy (c) vs. Blue Bar Kay for the AWO Championship
AWO Glory	October 10, 2017	Netanya		"The Rumble For Glory" match for the Vacant AWO Championship
AWO Legacy	November 14, 2017	Netanya		Goldman (c) vs. Adi Hurvitz for the AWO Championship
AWO Finish Line	December 19, 2017	Netanya		Goldman & Jake Mayhem vs. Adi Hurvitz & Max Rage

=== 2018 events ===
Event	Date	City	Venue	Main event
AWO ReBorn	February 20, 2018	Netanya		The New System (Ben Barel & Kannon Payne) (w/Rom Unger) vs. The Office (The Arabian Horse & Adi Hurvitz) in a Disband Or Fired match
AWO WarZone	March 20, 2018	Netanya		Goldman (c) vs. The New System (Ben Barel, Kannon Payne & Rom Unger) in a Gauntlet match for the AWO Championship
AWO Unlimited	April 24, 2018	Netanya		Rom Unger (c) vs. Blondevil for the AWO Championship
AWO Road to WrestleFest	May 29, 2018	Netanya		Rom Unger (c), Ben Barel & Kannon Payne vs. Blondevil in a 3 on 1 Gauntlet match for the AWO Championship
AWO WrestleFest 7	June 19, 2018	Netanya		Blondevil (c) vs. Benny "Thunder" Rigerowitz for the AWO Championship
AWO SummeRevolution	July 24, 2018	Netanya		Blondevil (c) vs. Hellboy for the AWO Championship
AWO Survival	August 14, 2018	Netanya		Blondevil (c) vs. Goldman for the AWO Championship
AWO Reboot	September 25, 2018	Netanya		Blondevil (c) vs. Gal Barkay for the AWO Championship
AWO Glory	October 16, 2018	Netanya		Blondevil (c) vs. Jeff "Fury" Jones (From Fighting Evolution Wrestling) for the AWO Championship
AWO Legacy	November 20, 2018	Netanya		Blondevil (c) vs. CJ Chaos for the AWO Championship
AWO Finish Line	December 18, 2018	Netanya		CJ Chaos (c) vs. Blondevil for the AWO Championship

=== 2019 events ===
Event	Date	City	Venue	Main event
AWO Vengeance Day	January 15, 2019	Netanya		CJ Chaos (c) vs. Oscar Vice for the AWO Championship
AWO ReBorn	February 19, 2019	Netanya		CJ Chaos (c) vs. Gal Barkay for the AWO Championship
AWO WarZone	March 19, 2019	Netanya		CJ Chaos (c) vs. Benny "Thunder" Rigerowitz for the AWO Championship
AWO Unlimited	April 9, 2019	Netanya		Benny "Thunder" Rigerowitz (c) vs. The Arabian Horse for the AWO Championship
AWO Road to WrestleFest	May 14, 2019	Netanya		Benny "Thunder" Rigerowitz (c) vs. Clobber Stone for the AWO Championship
AWO WrestleFest 8	June 18, 2019	Netanya		Blondevil vs. Benny "Thunder" Rigerowitz in Winner Takes All match for both the AWO World Heavyweight Championship and AWO Ukraine Championship
AWO SummeRevolution	July 30, 2019	Netanya		

== Championships ==
Championship	Current champion	Date won	Event	Previous champion
AWO Heavyweight Championship	Benny Rigerowitz	March 19, 2019	AWO WarZone	CJ Chaos
AWO Undisputed Championship	Goldman	March 19, 2019	AWO WarZone	Hellboy

=== AWO Heavyweight Championship ===
==== Reigns ====
Key
No.	Overall reign number
Reign	Reign number for the specific champion
Days	Number of days held
<1	Reign lasted less than a day
+	Current reign is changing daily

No.	Champion	Championship change			Reign statistics		Notes	Ref.
No.	Champion	Date	Event	Location	Reign	Days	Notes	Ref.
1	The Arabian Horse	June 21, 2012	Wrestlfest 1	Tira	1	140	Defeated Kronus in a tables match.	
2	Kronus	November 8, 2012	Face Off	Qalansawe	1	222	This was an open challenge.	
3	The Arabian Horse	June 18, 2013	Wrestlfest 2	Tira	2	40	This was a no holds barred match.	
4	Evgeny Lyder	July 28, 2013	WrestleChurch 1	Kafr Yasif	1	<1		
5	The Arabian Horse	July 28, 2013	WrestleChurch 1	Kfar Yasif	3	25		
6	Da Style	August 22, 2013	Summer Salam	Majd al-Krum	1	49		
7	Evgeny Lyder	October 10, 2013	TLV Clash	Tel Aviv	2	<1		
8	Blondevil	October 10, 2013	TLV Clash	Tel Aviv	1	170		
9	Ken Kerbis	March 29, 2014	The 11th Plaque	Jaffa	1	89	This was a battle royal also involving Adi Hurvitz, Eyal Smiley, Yaniv Sniper, Idan Boulder, Kronus, Shay Blanco and Udi M.	
10	Chris Masters	June 26, 2014	Wrestlfest 3	Tira	1	154	This was a triple threat match also involving Kronus.	
—	Vacated	November 27, 2014	—	—	—	—	Masters vacated the title due to other commitments preventing him from defending the title	
11	Ataman	December 5, 2014	International Mayhem 1	Kafr Qara	1	1	Won a 16-man Battle Royal for the vacant title.	
12	Blondevil	December 6, 2014	International Mayhem 2	Jaffa	2	202	This was a fatal four-way match also involving Ray Noceros and Shan Buddika.	
—	Vacated	June 26, 2015	—	—	—	—	Blondevil forfeited the title due to an injury.	
13	The Arabian Horse	June 27, 2015	Wrestlefest 4	Tira	4	22	Defeated Hellboy for the vacant title.	
14	Eyal Smiley	July 19, 2015	WrestleChurch 2	Kfar Yasif	1	145		
15	Mad Zenzero	December 11, 2015	UWI Showdown	Netanya	1	<1	This was a triple threat match also involving The Arabian Horse.	
16	The Arabian Horse	December 11, 2015	UWI Showdown	Netanya	5	90	Paid Mad Zenzero to drop the title to him in a match	
—	Vacated	March 10, 2016	—	—	—	—	The Arabian Horse vacated the title after not defending the title over 90 days	
17	Blondevil	June 28, 2016	Wrestlefest 5	Netanya	3	57	Defeated The Arabian Horse in a full metal mayhem match for the vacant title	
18	Goldman	August 24, 2016	AWO Survival	Netanya	1	181		
19	The Arabian Horse	February 21, 2017	AWO WarZone	Netanya	6	176	This was a 20-minute Iron Man match	
20	Jessie Roy	August 16, 2017	AWO Survival	Netanya	1	52		
—	Vacated	October 7, 2017	—	—	—	—	Jessie Roy vacated the title due to other commitments preventing him from defending the title	
21	Goldman	October 10, 2017	AWO Glory	Netanya	2	161	Won "The Rumble For Glory" over the top rope elimination match to win the vacant title	
22	Rom Unger	March 20, 2018	AWO WarZone	Netanya	1	70		
23	Blondevil	May 29, 2018	AWO Road To WrestleFest	Netanya	4	175	This was a Gauntlet match also involving Ben Barel and Kannon Payne.	
24	CJ Chaos	November 20, 2018	AWO Legacy	Netanya	1	119		
25	Benny Rigerowitz	March 19, 2019	AWO WarZone	Netanya	1	2,795+		

==== Combined reigns ====
†	Indicates the current champion

Rank	Wrestler	No. of reigns	Combined days
1	Blondevil	4	605
2	The Arabian Horse	6	598
3	Goldman	2	342
4	Kronus	1	222
5	Chris Masters	1	154
6	Eyal Smiley	1	145
7	CJ Chaos	1	119
8	Ken Kerbis	1	89
9	Rom Unger	1	70
10	Da Style	1	49
11	Benny Rigerowitz †	1	2,795+
12	Ataman	1	1
13	Evgeny Lyder	2	<1
14	Mad Zenzero	1	<1

=== AWO Undisputed Championship ===
==== Reigns ====
Key
No.	Overall reign number
Reign	Reign number for the specific champion
Days	Number of days held
+	Current reign is changing daily

No.	Champion	Championship change			Reign statistics		Notes	Ref.
No.	Champion	Date	Event	Location	Reign	Days	Notes	Ref.
1	Ken Kerbis	November 21, 2013	N/A	Tel Aviv	1	128		
2	Rixon Ruas	March 29, 2014	The 11th Plague	Jaffa	1	61		
3	Evgeny Lyder	May 29, 2014	N/A	Haifa	1	28		
4	Eyal Smiley	June 26, 2014	WrestleFest III	Tira	1	163		
5	Adi Hurvitz	December 6, 2014	International Mayhem (day 2)	Tel Aviv	1	570	From February 2015 to May 2016 the championship wasn't active as Adi was suspended from the promotion.	
6	Da Volk	June 28, 2016	WrestleFest V	Netanya	1	120		
—	Vacated	October 26, 2016	—	—	—	—		
7	Hellboy	January 24, 2017	AWO Legacy	Netanya	1	132		
8	CJ Chaos	June 5, 2017	AWO WrestleFest VI	Netanya	1	260		
9	Blue Bar Kay	February 20, 2018	AWO ReBorn	Netanya	1	63		
10	Jake Mayhem	April 24, 2018	AWO Unlimited	Netanya	1	112	General manager Rom Unger stripped AWO Undisputed Championship from Jake Mayhem due to Mayhem’s absence.	
—	Vacated	August 14, 2018	AWO Survival	Netanya	—	—		
11	Oscar Vice	August 14, 2018	AWO Survival	Netanya	1	98		
12	Mr. M	November 20, 2018	AWO Legacy	Netanya	1	91		
—	Vacated	February 19, 2019	AWO ReBorn	Netanya	—	—	Mr. M forfeited the title due to an injury.	
13	Hellboy	February 19, 2019	AWO ReBorn	Netanya	1	28	Defeated The BlonDevil for the vacant AWO Undisputed Championship.	
14	Goldman	March 19, 2019	AWO WarZone	Netanya	1	2,795+		

== See also ==
- Professional wrestling in Israel
