= David Starr (wrestler) =

American professional wrestler

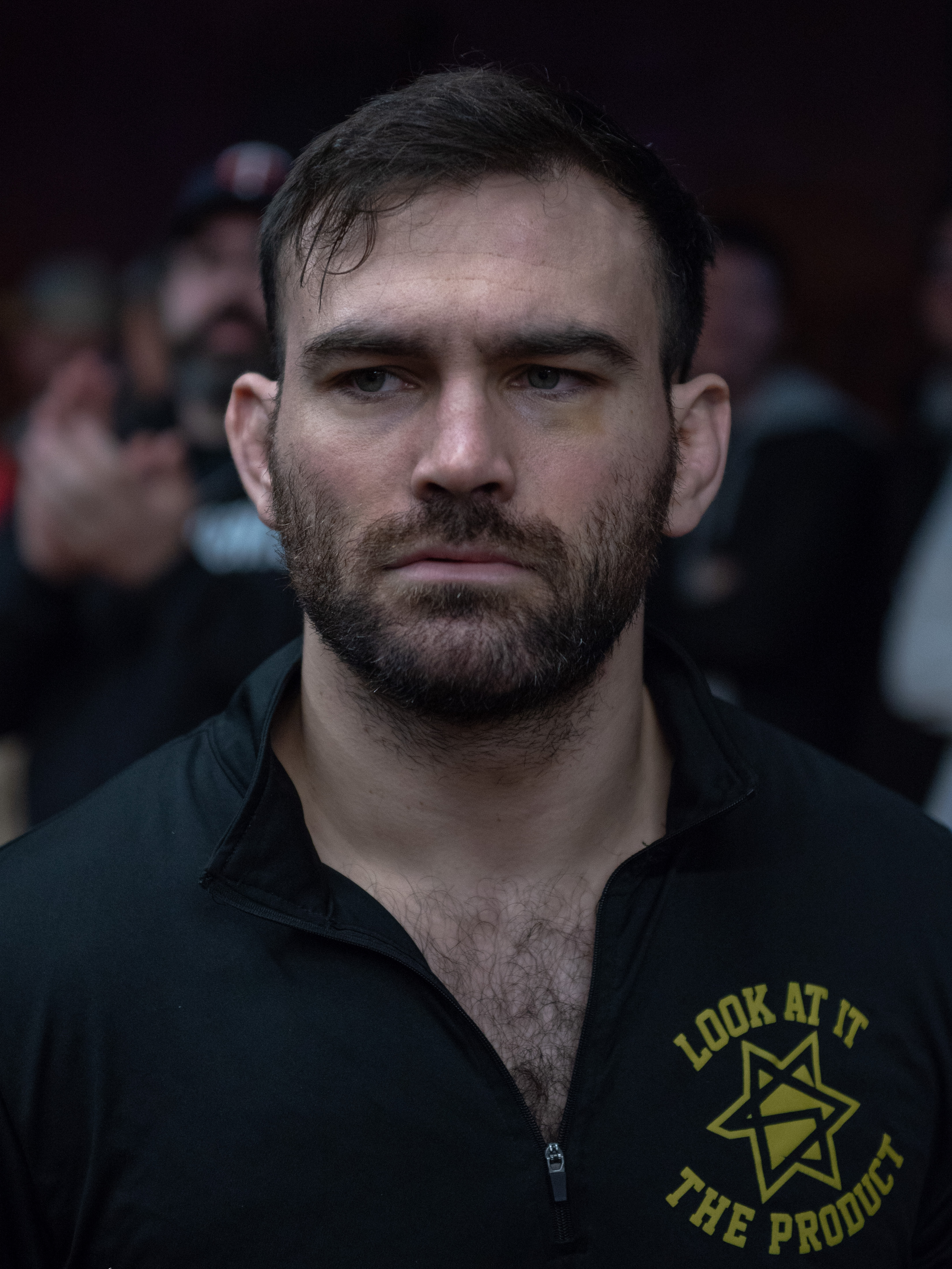
- Starr in 2019

Personal information
- Born: Charles Max Barsky; February 19, 1991 (age 35) Philadelphia, Pennsylvania, U.S.

Professional wrestling career
- Ring name(s): Davey Starr; David Starr
- Billed height: 5 ft 11 in (180 cm)
- Billed weight: 211 lb (96 kg)
- Trained by: Adam Cole; Combat Zone Wrestling Academy; DJ Hyde; Drew Gulak; Masada; Sami Callihan; Samu; Tommy Suede; Wild Samoan Pro Wrestling Training Center
- Debut: February 18, 2012
- Retired: 2020

Charles Max Barsky (born February 19, 1991), best known by his ring name David Starr, is an American bodybuilder and former professional wrestler.

He held championships and won tournaments for companies based in Australia, North America, France, Germany, Ireland and the United Kingdom. He was known for his charismatic demeanor and witty nicknames, which included "Your Favorite Wrestler's Favorite Wrestler", "The Physical Embodiment of Charisma", "The Jewish Cannon", and, most notably, "The Product".

Following sexual abuse allegations in 2020, Barsky denied the claims but announced he was immediately leaving the wrestling industry. He now works as a bodybuilder, and coach and judge for competitors.

== Early life ==
Starr began amateur wrestling at age seven. He continued with wrestling at Abington High School. Starr graduated in 2009 and was third all-time with 92 wins, and placed in the top 16 at the National High School Coaches Association (NHSCA) Nationals between 149 and 157 pounds.

He attended Elizabethtown College, before transferring to West Chester University. Starr transferred back to Elizabethtown College before dropping out in 2012. He was a National Collegiate Wrestling Association (NCWA) National qualifier at 157 pounds.

== Professional wrestling career ==
=== Independent circuit (2012–2019) ===
Starr started wrestling in 2012, when he debuted in World Xtreme Wrestling. His first match was against Supreme Lee Great in February 2012. On February 2, 2013, he unsuccessfully challenged Tommy Suede for the WXW Ultimate Hybrid Championship.

Starr debuted for Beyond Wrestling in 2013, losing to Latin Dragon in a four-way dark match in 2013 at Beyond Americana. He was eliminated by Shane Strickland On November 16 and 17, Starr wrestled at Beyond Tournament For Tomorrow II. He lost to Christina Von Eerie in block B on the first night. He lost to John Silver on the second night in a four-way match which also included Matthew Palmer and Rory Mondo. On August 28, 2016, Starr defeated Eddie Edwards at Beyond Battle Of Who Could Care Less. At Americanrana 2017, he defeated Donovan Dijak.

Starr defeated Eddie Kingston in an I Quit match at AAW Wrestling's AAW: Professional Wrestling Redefined's United We Stand in July 2017. Starr defeated Mike Quackenbush after hitting him with a lariat at Game Changer Wrestling's Joey Janela's Spring Break 2 during WrestleMania 34 weekend, on April 6, 2018. The same day, Starr defeated Martin Stone at a RevPro event. Starr challenged for the AAW Heavyweight Championship on May 11, 2019, when he was defeated by Sami Callihan.

In April 2019, Israeli Pro Wrestling Association's Passover Bash event, was announced to feature Jay Lethal defending the ROH World Championship against Starr. In March, Starr released a video on his feelings on the match, which Ring of Honor ordered to have taken down. A couple of weeks prior to the match, Lethal lost the championship at G1 Supercard, and wound up losing in the non-title match. So the match would still take place, but with no title on the line. He later blasted Ring of Honor, saying they lied to the promotion and the fans, by not having the title defended like they said.

=== Combat Zone Wrestling (2013−2019) ===
On January 12, 2013, Starr debuted for Combat Zone Wrestling at CZW Ascension. Later that year at CZW Night of Infamy 12 he unsuccessfully challenged for the CZW Wired TV Championship. At CZW Best Of The Best XIII The Juicy Product defeated OI4K in a CZW World Tag Team Championship number one contendership match. Later that month, The Juicy Product defeated The Beaver Boys to capture the CZW World Tag Team Championships for the first time. The Juicy Product lost the titles to OI4K at CZW Deja Vu 2014. At Night Of Infamy 2014, Starr lost to Drew Gulak. In 2016 at CZW Best of the Best, Starr made it to the finals only to lose to Jonathan Gresham.

On April 14, 2018, Starr participated in Best of the Best 17. Both Starr and Tessa Blanchard advanced to the semi-finals after both applied submissions on Peter Avalon. Starr advanced to the finals after he defeated Blanchard and Matt Riddle in a triple-threat match. He went on to the finals and defeated Zachary Wentz to win the Best of the Best 17.

=== WWE tryout (2014) ===
Between March 26 and 28, 2014, Starr competed in a WWE tryout at the WWE Performance Center alongside Michael Elgin, Roderick Strong, Kevin Steen, A. C. H., Willie Mack, and Zane Dawson.

=== Ring of Honor (2016–2017) ===
On January 9, 2016, Starr was involved in a dark match which was fatal four-way against Leon St. Giovanni, Ken Phoenix, and Foxx Vinyer to qualify for 2016 ROH Top Prospect Tournament in which St. Giovanni won.

In a match for Ring of Honor Wrestling which was taped on July 16, 2016; Starr was in a four-corner survival match against Cheeseburger, Joey Daddiego, and Tim Hughes. It ended in a no-contest as Punishment Martinez was summoned by B. J. Whitmer to attack all four participants in the match.

Starr made his return to ROH on the April 23 episode of Ring of Honor Wrestling attacking 2017 Top Prospect Tournament winner Josh Woods. On Night 4 of ROH/NJPW War of the Worlds 2017 in Philadelphia, Pennsylvania, Starr was defeated by Josh Woods. Later that month, Starr would go on to lose again to Woods.

=== Westside Xtreme Wrestling (2016–2020) ===
On October 2, 2016, Starr and Shane Strickland defeated Zack Sabre Jr and Marty Scurll in the final of World Tag Team League 2016 to win the wXw World Tag Team Championship. On November 18, 2016, Starr defeated Tyler Bate to become wXw Shotgun Champion. On December 10, Starr defeated Chris Brookes to become the Shotgun Champion for a second time.

On March 10, 2017, Starr entered the 2017 16 Carat Gold Tournament. He was eliminated in the first round by Walter. On July 1, Starr defeated Angélico to win the Shotgun Championship for a third time.

On March 7, 2020, Starr put his wXw career on the line against Bobby Gunns at 16 Carat Gold Night 2, with the wXw World Championship also on the line. Gunns ultimately retained the title and Starr was forced to leave the company.

=== European promotions (2016–2020) ===
On November 10, 2016, at Revolution Pro Wrestling (RevPro)'s "Global Wars: Night One" in London, England, Starr teamed with Tyler Bate and Trent Seven, losing to Evil, Tetsuya Naito, and Sanada. Evil got the pin on Starr. Starr won the RevPro British Cruiserweight Championship on May 11, 2018, at RevPro Epic Encounter 2018. He defeated Kip Sabian at a RevPro event on January 11, 2019, to successfully defend his title. He would go on to hold the title 364 days, until losing it May 11, 2019, at RevPro Epic Encounter 2019 to El Phantasmo in a ladder match.

In July 2017, Starr defeated Bobby Fish to qualify for What Culture Pro Wrestling's (WCPW) Pro Wrestling World Cup after hitting Fish with a Product Placement. Starr was eliminated by Jay Lethal. Around the same time WCPW turned into Defiant Wrestling, Starr joined the heel stable The Prestige with Joe Hendry and El Ligero. On January 5, 2019, Starr wrestled Pac in Pac's debut match for Defiant Wrestling. At Built to Destroy '19, Starr defeated Rampage to win the Defiant World Championship.

On February 11, 2018, in a match for International Pro Wrestling: United Kingdom, Starr challenged Nick Aldis for the NWA World Heavyweight Championship. Starr was the fifth challenger in The Aldis Crusade. Starr tapped out to a Cloverleaf.

At Super Strong Style 16 for Progress Wrestling, Starr won the SSS16 tournament that took place on May 6, 2019. In a promo leading up to the event, he called out Progress for their reliance on WWE contracted superstars, saying they lost their identity as an independent wrestling company. Due to him winning the tournament he will receive a match for the Progress Wrestling World Championship against NXT UK's Walter. Starr captured the Over the Top Wrestling World Championship from long-time rival and friend Jordan Devlin on October 26 in Dublin, Ireland. On June 18, 2020, Over the Top Wrestling announced Starr was stripped of the championship amidst allegations of sexual abuse against him.

== Personal life and sexual abuse allegations ==
Starr paid homage to his amateur wrestling career with a tattoo of the United States Wrestling logo on his right thigh. Starr's favorite wrestlers as a child were "Superstar" Billy Graham, Ric Flair, Dusty Rhodes, Chris Jericho, Stone Cold Steve Austin, and The Rock. Outside of wrestling, Starr is also a big fan of Floyd Mayweather, Conor McGregor, and Muhammad Ali.

Starr is a member of Democratic Socialists of America and a passionate supporter of Bernie Sanders, Alexandria Ocasio-Cortez and the Wear The Peace clothing brand. Starr is Jewish.

Starr was also a vocal supporter for the unionization of professional wrestlers and in 2019, he collaborated with Equity to form We the Independent, an organization made to help raise funds for wrestlers to unionize. In the ensuing months of its founding, Starr's efforts were gaining attention from mainstream media, and allegedly WWE pressured independent wrestling promotions Progress Wrestling and Westside Xtreme Wrestling to cease booking Starr over his pro-union stances. However, since his sexual abuse allegations came to light in June 2020, We the Independent severed ties with Starr and has abandoned their social media and website.

In June 2020, multiple former partners of Barsky came forward online alleging sexual, verbal, emotional, and financial abuse spanning years and these revelations kickstarted the global movement “#SpeakingOut movement,” often cited as the professional wrestling analogue to the MeToo movement. He denied all allegations but retired from pro-wrestling after being stripped of former titles and being denounced by multiple promotions and creative collaborators. Afterward, Barsky stated that he "reclaimed his life through sobriety and spirituality" during the time after the allegations were made public. He married Kat Barsky in 2024, and proclaimed himself four-years sober.

== Championships and accomplishments ==
- AAW Professional Wrestling
  - AAW Tag Team Championship (1 time) – with Eddie Kingston and Jeff Cobb
- Association les Professionnels du Catch
  - APC/wXw Fight for Paris Tournament (2020)
- Combat Zone Wrestling
  - CZW World Heavyweight Championship (1 time)
  - CZW World Tag Team Championship (1 time) – with J. T. Dunn
  - Best of the Best 17 (2018)
- Defiant Wrestling
  - Defiant World Championship (1 time, final)
  - No Regrets Rumble (2019)
- East Coast Pro Wrestling
  - ECPW Keystone Heavyweight Championship (1 time)
- Full Impact Pro
  - FIP World Tag Team Championship (1 time) – with J. T. Dunn
- International Wrestling Cartel
  - IWC Super Indy Championship (1 time)
- International Pro Wrestling: United Kingdom
  - IPW:UK World Championship (1 time)
- Kamikaze Pro
  - Relentless Division Championship (1 time)
- New Horizon Pro Wrestling
  - NHPW Hi-Fi Championship (1 time)
- New York Wrestling Connection
  - NYWC Tag Team Championship (1 time) – with J. T. Dunn
- Over the Top Wrestling
  - OTT World Championship (1 time)
- Pennsylvania Premiere Wrestling
  - PPW Heavyweight Championship (2 times)
  - PPW Heavyweight Championship Tournament (2013)
- Pro Wrestling Illustrated
  - Ranked No. 99 of the top 500 singles wrestlers in the PWI 500 in 2019.
- Progress Wrestling
  - Super Strong Style 16 (2019)
- Revolution Pro Wrestling
  - RPW British Cruiserweight Championship (1 time)
  - SWE World Heavyweight Championship (1 time)
- Rockstar Pro Wrestling
  - Rockstar Pro Championship (1 time)
- Tier 1 Wrestling
  - Tier 1 Tag Team Championship (1 time) – with Mike Verna
- TNT Extreme Wrestling
  - TNT World Championship (1 time)
  - Male Wrestler of the Year Award (2019)
- Ultimate Pro Wrestling
  - UPW Heavyweight Championship (1 time)
- Westside Xtreme Wrestling
  - wXw Shotgun Championship (3 times)
  - wXw World Tag Team Championship (1 time) – with Shane Strickland
  - World Tag League (2016) – with Shane Strickland
- Women Superstars Uncensored
  - WSU Tag Team Championship (1 time) – with J. T. Dunn
- Xtreme Wrestling Alliance
  - XWA Heavyweight Championship (1 time)
  - Xtreme Rumble (2014)

== See also ==
- List of Jewish professional wrestlers
