= Tatanka (wrestler) =

American professional wrestler (born 1961)

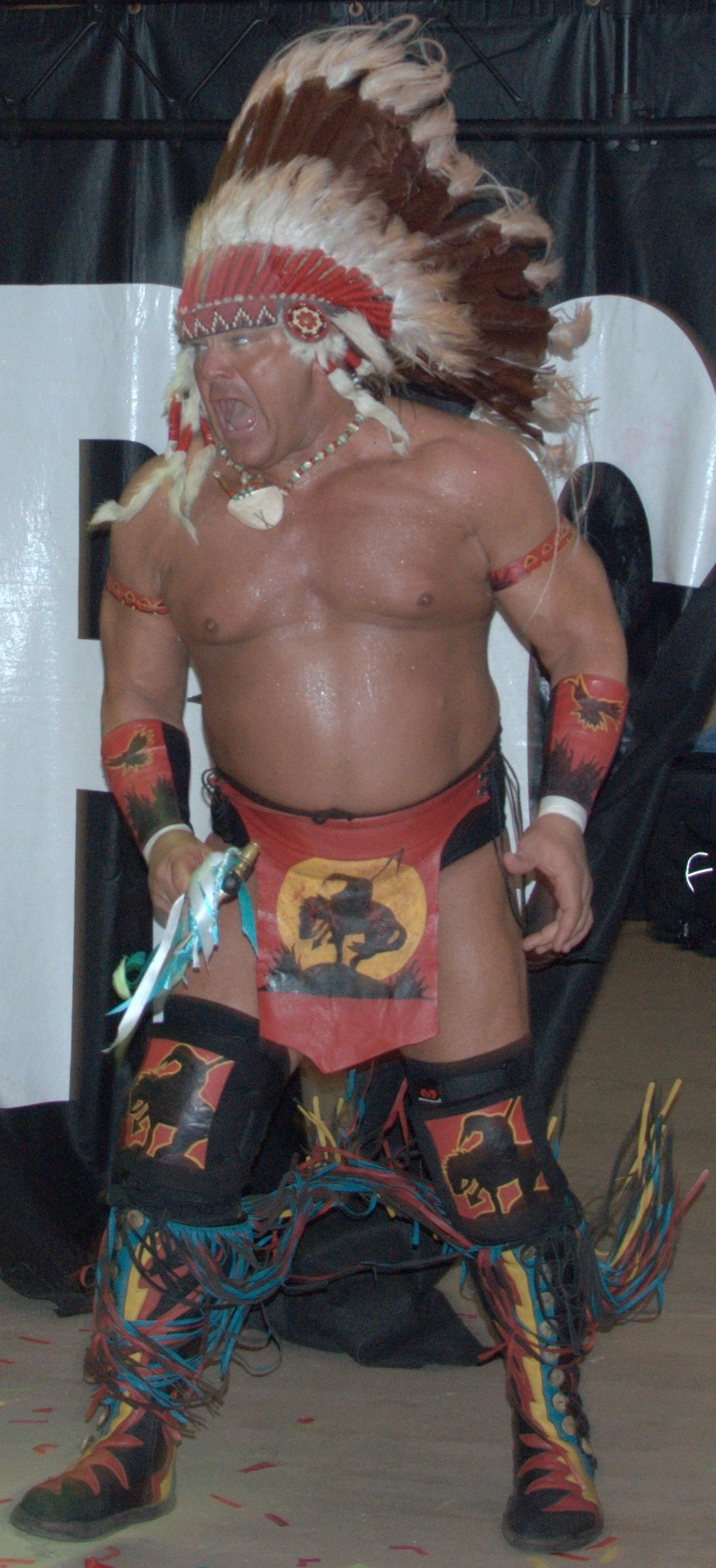
- Tatanka in 2017

Personal information
- Born: Christopher Chavis; June 8, 1961 (age 65) Pembroke, North Carolina, U.S.
- Spouses: Dawn Doyle (m. 1989; div. 1994) Michelle Chavis (m. 1997)
- Children: 4

Professional wrestling career
- Ring name(s): The Legend; Tatanka; War Eagle
- Billed height: 6 ft 2 in (188 cm)
- Billed weight: 285 lb (129 kg)
- Billed from: Charlotte, North Carolina
- Trained by: Larry Sharpe
- Debut: 1990
- Retired: 2022

Christopher "Chris" Chavis (born June 8, 1961) is an American retired professional wrestler. He is signed to WWE, under a legends contract. He is citizen of the Lumbee Tribe of North Carolina. He is best known for his tenures in the World Wrestling Federation/World Wrestling Entertainment under the ring name Tatanka from 1991 to 1996 and from 2005 to 2007. His ring name is a Lakota word, which means "bison".

== Bodybuilding and football careers ==
Chavis started competing in powerlifting. He competed in his first bodybuilding contest, Mr. Virginia Beach, placing second. He won many competitions during his time in bodybuilding, but decided against competing on the national level and possibly turning pro. From 1985 to 1990 he worked for Bally's Health and Tennis Corporation, becoming a divisional manager.

Chavis went to the open try outs during the 1987 NFL player strike for the Miami Dolphins and made the cut, but he turned it down due to the lucrative money he was already making selling memberships at Bally's. In 1989, Chavis left Bally's to pursue an accounting career.

== Professional wrestling career ==
=== Early career (1989–1990) ===
In 1989, Chavis met "Nature Boy" Buddy Rogers in Florida at a video store while looking for wrestling tapes. Rogers had Chavis call Larry Sharpe, who ran Monster Factory in South Jersey. He had his first match, as "Tatanka", against Joe Thunder in Philadelphia, Pennsylvania, on January 13, 1990.

Rogers introduced Chavis to George Scott, the booker for the World Wrestling Federation (WWF) during the 1980s. Scott was starting his own promotion called the North American Wrestling Association. Chavis wrestled under the name "War Eagle" Chris Chavis and was voted third runner up for PWI Rookie of the Year in Pro Wrestling Illustrated for 1990. Also in 1990, he became the South Atlantic Pro Wrestling Heavyweight Champion by beating Vince Torelli. Not long after, he was signed to a WWF contract.

=== World Wrestling Federation (1991–1996) ===
==== Undefeated streak (1991–1994) ====
Chavis received his first try-out match with the WWF on January 8, 1991, as War Eagle against Dale Wolfe at a WWF Wrestling Challenge taping in Chattanooga, Tennessee. He received a second try-out on February 18, 1991, against the Brooklyn Brawler at a WWF Superstars taping in Orlando, Florida. Wrestling as the War Eagle, Chavis was victorious. He followed it up with another win against Dale Wolfe the next day at a Wrestling Challenge taping. On October 21 he received what was likely another tryout match at a Superstars taping, this time defeating Skinner. In November Chavis began wrestling on house shows under his given name. Soon after, he took on the ring name "Tatanka". After wrestling in try-out matches at house shows, Tatanka made his television debut as a fan favorite on the February 1, 1992, episode of WWF Superstars, defeating Pat Tanaka in his debut match. As Tatanka, Chavis performed a war dance to the Lumbee tribal war cry that preceded his entrance to the ring, and had a red stripe dyed in the middle of his hair in a mohawk style.

Tatanka was pushed as undefeated on WWF television; he did not suffer any defeat by pinfall or submission, but he lost several matches at house shows, the first being a countout loss to Rick Martel on June 4, 1992, in Fort Wayne, Indiana. Tatanka's earliest rivalry on television was against Martel; it culminated in Tatanka's pay-per-view debut at WrestleMania VIII with Tatanka winning the match. On May 18, 1992, Tatanka reached the peak of his success by winning the 40-man Bashed in the USA battle royal. He renewed his "feud" with Martel, who had stolen sacred eagle feathers from him to add to his wardrobe, going on to defeat Martel again at Survivor Series to reclaim the feathers.

At WrestleMania IX, Tatanka received his first televised title shot in the WWF, against Shawn Michaels for the WWF Intercontinental Championship. Tatanka won the match by disqualification. Since a title could not change hands on a disqualification, Michaels retained the title. On the October 30, 1993, edition of Superstars, Tatanka suffered his first televised defeat in the WWF, losing to Ludvig Borga (Borga had hit Tatanka in the back with a steel chair while Mr. Fuji distracted the referee). After the match, he was attacked by WWF Champion Yokozuna and was subsequently out of action for three months.

Tatanka returned to the WWF in the beginning of 1994; he stopped using the red stripe in his hair. He was scheduled to face Borga in a rematch at the Royal Rumble, but Borga injured his ankle in a match with Rick Steiner at a house show just days before the event. Borga was replaced by Bam Bam Bigelow, who Tatanka defeated. Bigelow, however, would go on to eliminate Tatanka from the 30-man Royal Rumble match.

On the March 7 episode of Raw, Tatanka was honored by retired professional wrestlers Chief Jay Strongbow and Chief Wahoo McDaniel and by Lumbee tribesman Ray Littleturtle. Littleturtle presented him with a full-length Lumbee tribe chief headdress. Throughout mid-1994, Tatanka engaged in a storyline feud with Irwin R. Schyster, who insisted he pay a gift tax on the item, but Tatanka refused. On the April 16th episode of WWF Superstars of Wrestling, Schyster interfered in Tatanka's match against Kwang and tied him in the ring ropes, grabbed the headdress and destroyed it and then Chief Jay Strongbow came to save Tatanka by attacking Schyster, but Schyster attacked Strongbow. Tatanka continued the feud with Schyster with Strongbow briefly serving as his manager.

==== Million Dollar Corporation (1994–1996) ====
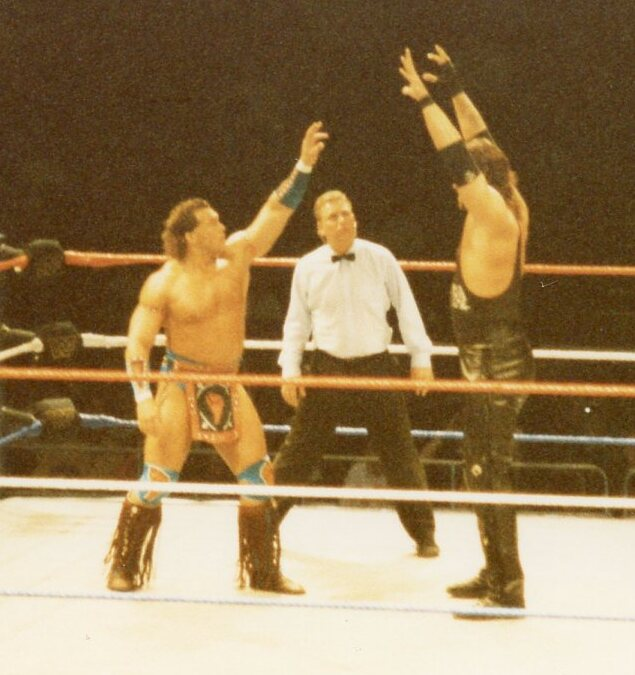
Tatanka (left) wrestling Diesel in 1994

During the summer of 1994, Tatanka accused Lex Luger of selling out to Ted DiBiase, which resulted in a match between the two. Afterward, DiBiase entered the ring with a red, white and blue bag full of money. Luger kicked the bag out of DiBiase's hands resulting in Tatanka attacking him and turning him into a villain at SummerSlam, joining DiBiase's Million Dollar Corporation. He spent the remainder of the year feuding with Luger which topped off in a cage match on Raw that saw Luger come out the victor. According to Tatanka, the original plan was to have Barry Windham return to the WWF and form the "New Money Inc." with (his brother in-law) Irwin R. Schyster and managed by DiBiase and have a long feud with Luger (Windham's long time rival from NWA and WCW) and Tatanka, however Windham suffered a knee injury from Ric Flair at Slamboree and the WWF couldn't reach a deal with him and Luger suggested that his next feud be with Tatanka instead and WWF agreed.

In spring 1995, Tatanka had another feud with Bam Bam Bigelow, who just turned face. As a result, he teamed with Sycho Sid at the King of the Ring pay-per-view to lose to Bigelow and Diesel.

Tatanka was suspended on August 30, reportedly as a preemptive measure for being named in a lawsuit to be filed by a woman stemming from an incident in Anaheim, California, following a WWF event in late 1994. According to sources, the woman was said to have been drugged, sodomized and her head shaved on only one side. Kevin Nash reiterated this story in an interview with Kayfabe Commentaries. The woman was having drinks with him and Undertaker the night prior. When the wrestlers were leaving the hotel the following morning, Nash noticed that she was seated in between two police officers. The hallway was smeared in blood. She had half her head shaven as she was crying, reporting the incident to the officers. In the interview, however, Nash presumed the person who did this was Jimmy Del Ray because of similar stories of Del Ray. During representation by Tatanka's attorney the facts showed that Tatanka was not involved in the incident at all and Del Ray was fired from the company; Tatanka's suspension was lifted and he returned with full-pay to the active WWF roster. As Nash noted in his interview, he knew that Tatanka was not involved at all, but he had been around Del Ray that night, which caused Tatanka to also be named and unfairly suspended.

Following this hiatus at the end of August 1995, Tatanka returned to the WWF to compete in the Royal Rumble event, where he was eliminated by Diesel.

On March 18, 1996, Tatanka wrestled his final televised match in the WWF, losing to the WWF champion Bret Hart in a non-title match where he (despite his heel role) got a face pop for accidentally hitting The 1-2-3 Kid when Kid grabbed Bret, and Tatanka was supposed to hit Bret but Bret ducked out of the way and Tatanka ended up hitting Kid by accident instead. Tatanka left the WWF in the spring of 1996, citing family and spiritual issues. He continued to appear for independent promotions, which allowed him to continue to wrestle while maintaining a lighter schedule.

=== Independent circuit and international promotions (1996–2003) ===
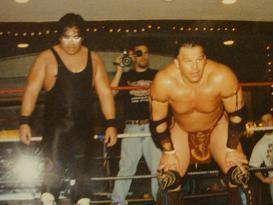
Tatanka with Falcon Coperis in 1997

After WWF, Tatanka worked in the independents. He lost to his former tag partner Bam Bam Bigelow on September 28, 1996 at EWA/USWF show in New York City. In 1997, Chavis wrestled for the independent New York-based promotion Ultimate Championship Wrestling (UCW), where he wrestled Bruce Hart of the Hart wrestling family, King Kong Bundy, Jim "The Anvil" Neidhart and Marty Jannetty. He went from playing the role of a face to a heel when he turned on Falcon Coperis and Tommy Cairo to align himself with the likes of the UWF faction of the organization which included Neidhart, Hart, and eventually Jannetty. Chavis captured the UCW Heavyweight Championship title and handed then-champion Falcon Coperis his first championship defeat. Chavis remained champion until the organization folded its professional wrestling division in 1998.

He won the Stampede Wrestling North American Heavyweight Championship on April 8, 1998, defeating Sid Vicious in a fictitious tournament final. During the reign, he would feud with Jim Neidhart and his cousin Jason Neidhart in 1999. That year he vacated the title as he left Stampede. He would work for Florida's Future Of Wrestling from 1998 to 2000.

In 2000, he won the i-Generation Wrestling Australasian Championship defeating the One Man Gang in Australia. A few days later he dropped the title back to the One Man Gang. In 2001, he worked in England and in 2002 worked in Canada and Ireland. In 2003, he made an appearance for Combat Zone Wrestling. Tatanka then took a hiatus from wrestling and was not seen in the public eye for over two years.

=== Return to WWE (2005–2007) ===
==== Feud with MNM (2005−2006) ====
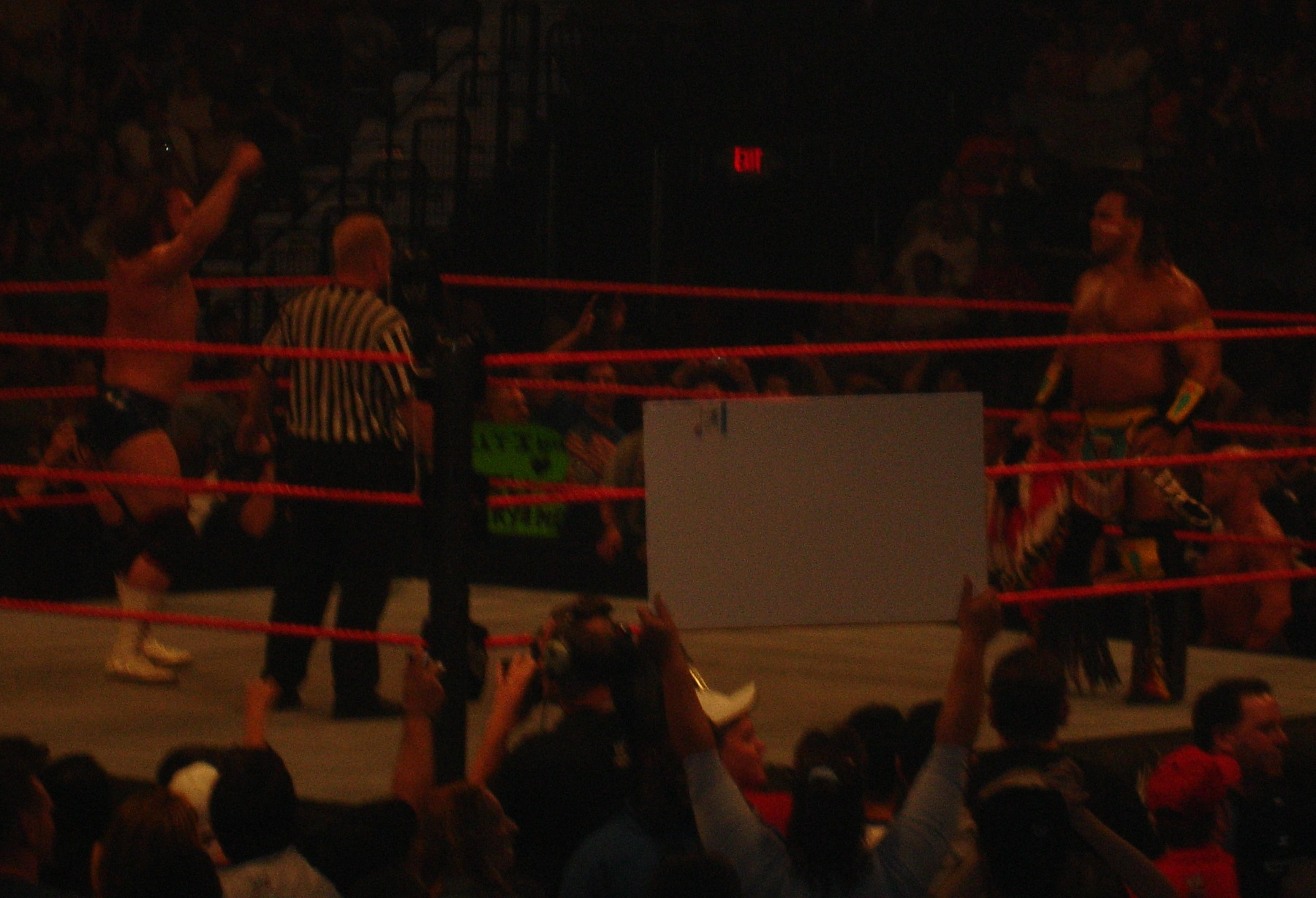
Eugene and Tatanka in the ring during Tatanka's return in August 2005

On August 1, 2005, Chavis returned to Raw as a face once again which was intended to be a special one-time appearance to face Eugene in the "Eugene Invitational", a three-minute match with Kurt Angle's Olympic gold medal on the line. Tatanka lost the match when Angle attacked Eugene with 27 seconds remaining, causing a disqualification.

Chavis returned to a full-time schedule for WWE at the tail end of 2005, debuting at a December 27 house show, teaming with Shelton Benjamin in a win over Carlito and Jonathan Coachman. He returned to television in the Royal Rumble match at the January 2006 event, where he was eliminated by Joey Mercury and Johnny Nitro. The next month he began appearing on Velocity before being moved full-time to the SmackDown! brand.

As a face, Chavis teamed with Matt Hardy to defeat MNM, the then-WWE Tag Team Champions, in a non-title match at No Way Out on February 19. They were granted a title shot on the next edition of SmackDown!, but lost. On the April 28 SmackDown! a vignette played announcing that "a new warrior would soon be forged in Tatanka". Over the next three weeks footage aired of Tatanka being (legitimately) adopted into the Oglala Sioux Tribe (Lakota). When he returned to wrestling Tatanka defeated Simon Dean with his new finisher, "Wakinyan" (from the Lakota word for "Thunder").

==== Various feuds and departure (2006−2007) ====
On the September 1 episode of SmackDown!, he lost to The Miz in The Miz's debut match, and would later lose a rematch to The Miz as well. Tatanka engaged in a mini-feud with Sylvain Grenier, trading victories with him, before he was moved into an angle where he entered into a losing streak due to what he perceived to be bad decision-making by referees during his matches, especially Charles Robinson. This escalated until the October 27 SmackDown! when Tatanka, alongside partner Bobby Lashley, lost a match to William Regal and Dave Taylor when Regal pinned Tatanka by illegally using the ropes (during the pin Dave Taylor got his hands in the last second). After the match Tatanka argued the decision again, then he turned heel by attacking the referee and then Lashley when he tried to calm him down. The next week he appeared on SmackDown! with a new style of warpaint, covering the top of his face in black and the bottom in white, and cut a promo on Lashley saying he owed neither him nor the crowd an explanation for his actions. He compared his recent losing streak to the years of persecution that his people had suffered over the years and said that he "called upon his forefathers to unleash a new warrior in [him]" and also said if Lashley went to war with [me] or war with a whole nation of warriors. He asked for and was released from his WWE contract on January 19, 2007, but not before ending his losing streak by defeating Jimmy Wang Yang, his first victory in months. WWE.com noted this event with these parting words: "Tatanka is an accomplished veteran of the squared circle. The Native American made a splash upon his entrance to the WWE in the early 90s, remaining undefeated for two years." Tatanka stated on his official website that he requested to be released and mentioned he was not done with WWE as he would like to return someday.

=== Second return to the independent circuit (2007–2022) ===
In 2008 Tatanka toured Ireland and France with the American Wrestling Rampage tour. He also wrestled for All Star Promotions in the United Kingdom. He competed in All Star and American Wrestling between August 29 to October 31, 2008, in the Tower Circus area of Blackpool Tower.

Tatanka made an appearance in Danish Pro Wrestling (DPW) and lost to Chaos after he was hit by a DDT. He was given a standing ovation after the match.

Tatanka appeared in Total Nonstop Action Wrestling on the December 17, 2009, episode of Impact where he defeated Jay Lethal in a Black Machismo Invitational Match with an End of the Trail.

Tatanka also made headlines in Scotland while appearing for Scottish Wrestling Entertainment, renewing his partnership with the Million Dollar Man Ted DiBiase in Dundee. Tatanka was due to return to Scotland to wrestle for the SWE at the Dewars Centre in Perth on August 25, 2012.

On August 8, 2012, Chikara announced that Tatanka would be making his debut for the promotion in the following month's 2012 King of Trios tournament, where he will team with the 1-2-3 Kid and Aldo Montoya as "Team WWF". In their first round match on September 14, Team WWF was defeated by The Extreme Trio (Jerry Lynn, Tommy Dreamer and Too Cold Scorpio). The following day, Tatanka defeated Sugar Dunkerton in a singles match.

Tatanka made another appearance in Danish Pro Wrestling (DPW) and defeated Chaos after hitting Wykea after a long and enduring match. He was given a standing ovation once again.

He also wrestled in Germany in June 2013 for ACW (Athletik Club Wrestling) and GHW (German Hurricane Wrestling).

On May 2, 2014, Tatanka won the DPW Tag Team Championship along with Rick "The Prick" Dominick. They lost the titles on October 18, 2014, to Ravn and Demolition Davies.

=== Second return to WWE (2010–present) ===
==== Sporadic appearances (2010−present) ====
Tatanka made an appearance on the Old School Raw on November 15, 2010, backstage along with Ron Simmons, Dusty Rhodes, IRS, and The "Million Dollar Man" Ted DiBiase.

On November 3, 2015, WWE announced that they signed Tatanka to a Legends contract. On April 3, 2016, at WrestleMania 32, Tatanka competed in the Andre the Giant Memorial Battle Royal as a face and was among the last to be eliminated.

On January 4, 2021, Tatanka, in full ring gear made an appearance for a special episode of Raw called "Raw Legends Night". On May 24, 2025 he was shown in the crowd during Saturday Night's Main Event XXXIX.

== Personal life ==
Chavis and his wife, Michelle, have four children.

== Video games ==
Tatanka is a playable character in WWF Royal Rumble and WWF Rage in the Cage. He is in the WWE 2K17 video game as DLC. He also appears in WWE 2K18 and WWE 2K19 as a playable character.

== Championships and accomplishments ==
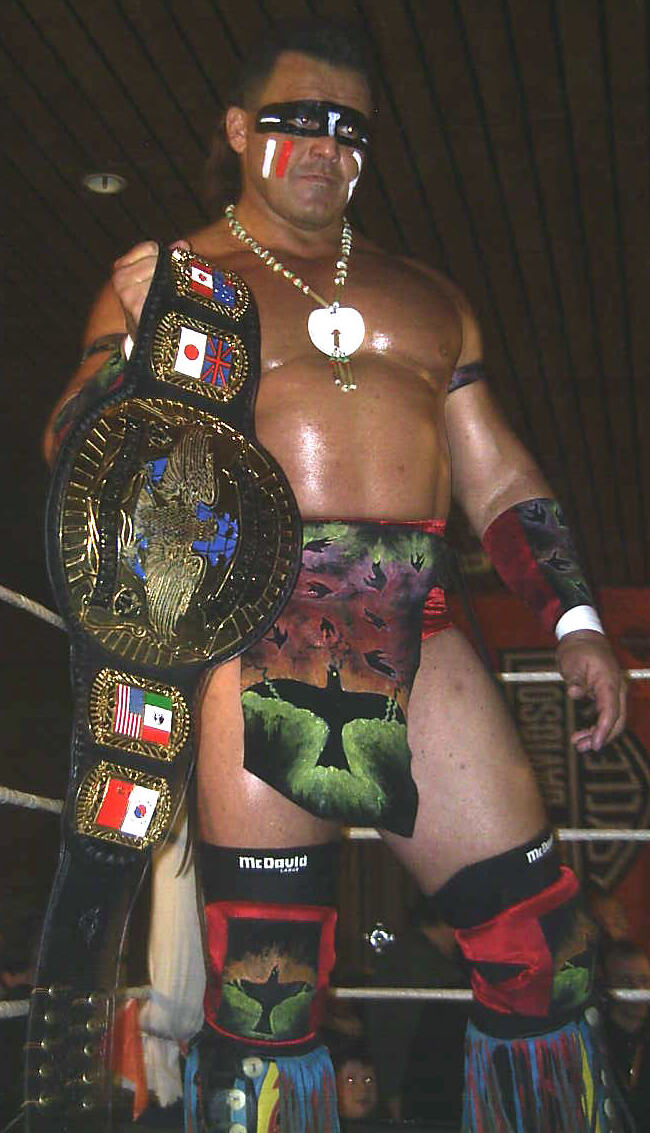
Tatanka as DWA World Heavyweight Champion in 1997

- All-Star Wrestling
  - ASW Legends Championship (1 time)
- Athletik Club Wrestling
  - ACW German Championship (1 time)
- Classic Wrestling Entertainment
  - CWE Rhein-Neckar-Wrestling Championship (1 time)
- Covey Promotions
  - Covey Pro Heavyweight Championship (1 time)
- Dansk Pro Wrestling
  - DPW Tag Team Championship (1 time) – with Rick Dominick
- Deutsche Wrestling Allianz
  - DWA World Heavyweight Championship (1 time)
- German Hurricane Wrestling
  - GHW Heavyweight Championship (1 time)
- i-Generation Superstars of Wrestling
  - i-Generation Australasian Heavyweight Championship (2 times)
- Independent Pro Wrestling Germany
  - IPW Germany Tag Team Championship (1 time) - with Demolition Davies
- International Wrestling Superstars
  - Wrestler of the Year (2003)
- Israeli Pro Wrestling Association
  - IPWA Heavyweight Championship (1 time)
- Italian Wrestling Superstar
  - IWS Heavyweight Championship (1 time)
- Maximum Force Wrestling
  - MFW Tag Team Championship (1 time) - with Primal Warpath
- North American Wrestling Association
  - Mercedes Benz 400 SL Tournament (1990)
- Pro Wrestling Illustrated
  - Ranked No. 279 of the 500 best singles wrestlers during the PWI Years in 2003
  - Ranked No. 40 of the top 500 singles wrestlers in the PWI 500 in 1994
- South Atlantic Pro Wrestling
  - SAPW Heavyweight Championship (1 time)
- Stampede Wrestling
  - Stampede North American Heavyweight Championship (1 time)
- Top Rope Championship Wrestling
  - TRCW International Heavyweight Championship (1 time)
- United States Wrestling Association
  - USWA Unified World Heavyweight Championship (1 time)
- World Wrestling Federation
  - Slammy Award (1 time)
    - Greediest (1994)
- Other titles
  - IWA World Heavyweight Championship (1 time)

== Bibliography ==
- Christian Wrestlers: Wrestling With God, 2001, by Chad Bonham, ISBN 1-58919-935-9
