= Walter Hahn =

Walter Hahn may refer to:

- Walter Hahn (football manager), German football manager who managed Lithuania
- Walter Hahn (wrestler) (born 1987), Austrian professional wrestler and trainer known as Gunther
