= 16 Carat Gold Tournament =

Annual wrestling tournament in Germany

16 Carat Gold
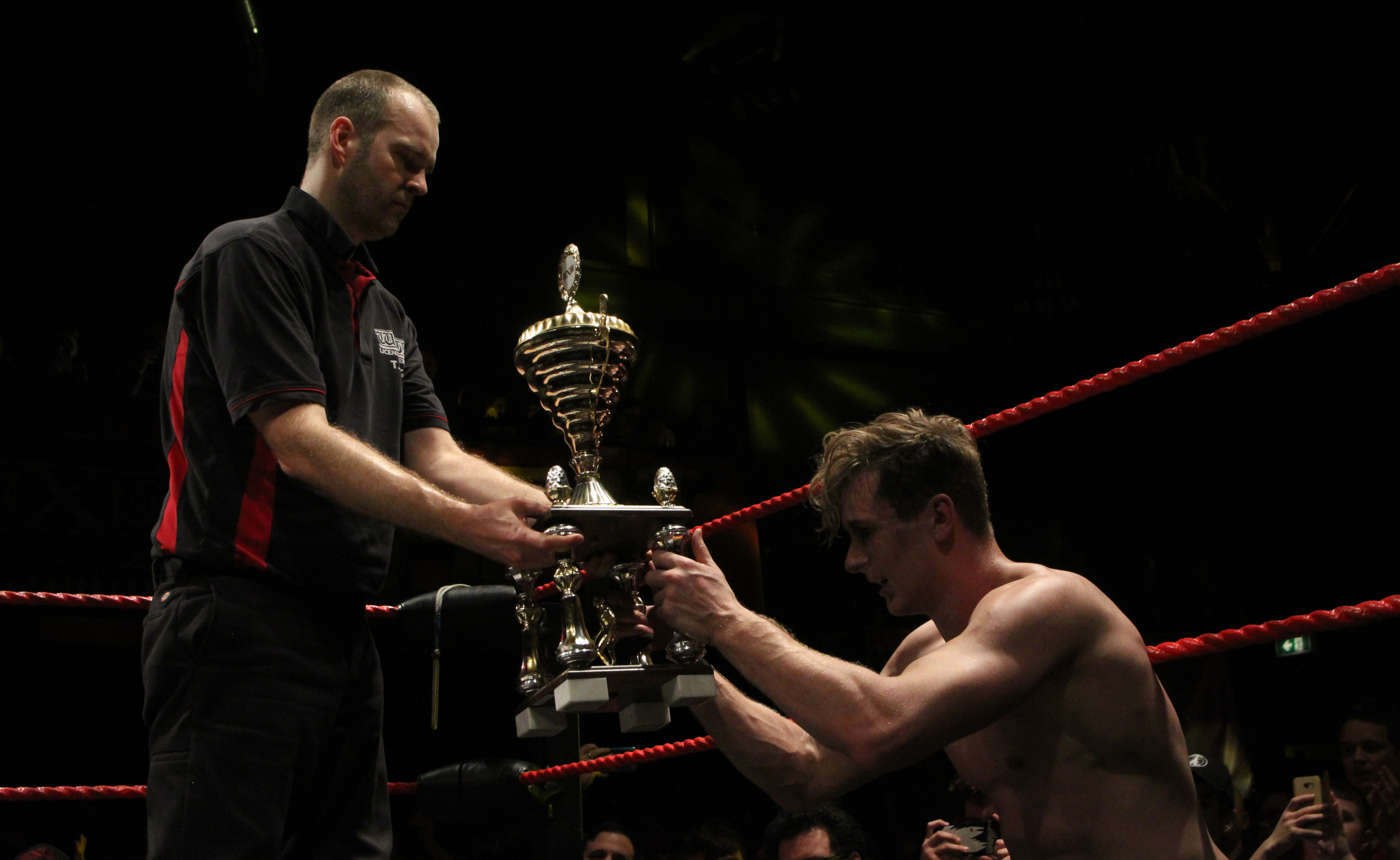
- Cara Noir being awarded the tournament trophy in 2020
- Promotion: Westside Xtreme Wrestling
- First event: 2006
- Event gimmick: 16 Carat Gold Tournament

Tournament information
- Established: 2006; 20 years ago
- Current winner: Ahura
- Last completed: 2026
- Prize: wXw Unified World Wrestling Championship match
- Editions: 19
- Format: Single-elimination tournament
- Participants: 16
Statistics
- First winner: Baron von Hagen
- Most wins: 2 wins: Chris Hero; Tommy End

The 16 Carat Gold Tournament is an annual single-elimination tournament produced by the Westside Xtreme Wrestling (wXw) promotion. The sixteen-man tournament was first conceived by wXw in 2006 and has been held every year since then with the exception of the 2021 edition which was cancelled due to the COVID-19 pandemic. Since 2007, the tournament winner has received a championship opportunity for the wXw Unified World Wrestling Championship, the promotion's top title, with a few exceptions due to championship vacancy.

== Dates, winners and main events ==
Year	Winner	Times won	Dates	Runner-up	Location	Venue	Main event	Ref
2006	Baron von Hagen	1	January 27, 2006	Murat Bosporus	Essen, North Rhine-Westphalia	Turock	Baron von Hagen vs. Iceman in the first round of the 2006 16 Carat Gold Tournament	
2006	Baron von Hagen	1	January 28, 2006	Murat Bosporus	Essen, North Rhine-Westphalia	Turock	Doug Williams vs. Rocky Romero in the quarter-final round of the 2006 16 Carat Gold Tournament	
2006	Baron von Hagen	1	January 29, 2006	Murat Bosporus	Essen, North Rhine-Westphalia	Turock	Iceman (c) vs. Ian Rotten in a Deathmatch for the wXw Hardcore Championship	
2007	Chris Hero	1	May 4, 2007	Ares	Essen, North Rhine-Westphalia	Musikpalette	Chris Hero vs. Claudio Castagnoli in the first round of the 2007 16 Carat Gold Tournament	
2007	Chris Hero	1	May 5, 2007	Ares	Essen, North Rhine-Westphalia	Musikpalette	Go Shiozaki vs. Murat Bosporus in the quarter-final round of the 2007 16 Carat Gold Tournament	
2007	Chris Hero	1	May 6, 2007	Ares	Essen, North Rhine-Westphalia	Musikpalette	Ares vs. Chris Hero in the final of the 2007 16 Carat Gold Tournament	
2008	Bad Bones	1	March 7, 2008	Bryan Danielson	Essen, North Rhine-Westphalia	Musikpalette	Doug Williams vs. Naomichi Marufuji in the first round of the 2008 16 Carat Gold Tournament	
2008	Bad Bones	1	March 8, 2008	Bryan Danielson	Essen, North Rhine-Westphalia	Musikpalette	Alex Pain vs. Steve Douglas in a Relaxed Rules match for the wXw World Heavyweight Championship	
2008	Bad Bones	1	March 9, 2008	Bryan Danielson	Essen, North Rhine-Westphalia	Musikpalette	Bad Bones vs. Bryan Danielson in the final of the 2008 16 Carat Gold Tournament	
2009	Shingo Takagi	1	March 6, 2009	Drake Younger	Oberhausen, North Rhine-Westphalia	Saint Oberhausen	Chris Sabin vs. Tyler Black in the first round of the 2009 16 Carat Gold Tournament	
2009	Shingo Takagi	1	March 7, 2009	Drake Younger	Oberhausen, North Rhine-Westphalia	Turbinenhalle Oberhausen	Bad Bones (c) vs. Bryan Danielson for the wXw World Heavyweight Championship	
2009	Shingo Takagi	1	March 8, 2009	Drake Younger	Oberhausen, North Rhine-Westphalia	Turbinenhalle Oberhausen	Drake Younger vs. Shingo Takagi in the final of the 2009 16 Carat Gold Tournament	
2010	Big Van Walter	1	March 5, 2010	Chris Hero	Oberhausen, North Rhine-Westphalia	Turbinenhalle Oberhausen	Bad Bones vs. Chris Hero in the first round of the 2010 16 Carat Gold Tournament	
2010	Big Van Walter	1	March 6, 2010	Chris Hero	Oberhausen, North Rhine-Westphalia	Turbinenhalle Oberhausen	Steve Douglas (c) vs. Absolute Andy in a falls count anywhere match for the wXw World Heavyweight Championship	
2010	Big Van Walter	1	March 7, 2010	Chris Hero	Oberhausen, North Rhine-Westphalia	Turbinenhalle Oberhausen	Big Van Walter vs. Chris Hero in the final of the 2010 16 Carat Gold Tournament	
2011	Sami Callihan	1	March 11, 2011	Big Van Walter	Oberhausen, North Rhine-Westphalia	Turbinenhalle Oberhausen	Daisuke Sekimoto (c) vs. Bad Bones for the wXw Unified World Wrestling Championship	
2011	Sami Callihan	1	March 12, 2011	Big Van Walter	Oberhausen, North Rhine-Westphalia	Steffy's Nightclub	Daisuke Sekimoto (c) vs. Johnny Moss for the wXw Unified World Wrestling Championship	
2011	Sami Callihan	1	March 13, 2011	Big Van Walter	Oberhausen, North Rhine-Westphalia	Turbinenhalle Oberhausen	Big Van Walter vs. Sami Callihan in the final of the 2011 16 Carat Gold Tournament	
2012	El Generico	1	March 2, 2012	Tommy End	Oberhausen, North Rhine-Westphalia	Turbinenhalle Oberhausen	Fit Finlay vs. Sami Callihan in the first round of the 2012 16 Carat Gold Tournament	
2012	El Generico	1	March 3, 2012	Tommy End	Oberhausen, North Rhine-Westphalia	Turbinenhalle Oberhausen	Big Van Walter (c) vs. Daisuke Sekimoto for the wXw Unified World Wrestling Championship	
2012	El Generico	1	March 4, 2012	Tommy End	Oberhausen, North Rhine-Westphalia	Turbinenhalle Oberhausen	El Generico vs. Tommy End in the final of the 2012 16 Carat Gold Tournament	
2013	Tommy End	1	March 1, 2013	Zack Sabre Jr.	Oberhausen, North Rhine-Westphalia	Turbinenhalle Oberhausen	Johnny Moss vs. Zack Sabre Jr. in the first round of the 2013 16 Carat Gold Tournament	
2013	Tommy End	1	March 2, 2013	Zack Sabre Jr.	Oberhausen, North Rhine-Westphalia	Turbinenhalle Oberhausen	Axel Tischer (c) vs. Big Van Walter for the wXw Unified World Wrestling Championship	
2013	Tommy End	1	March 3, 2013	Zack Sabre Jr.	Oberhausen, North Rhine-Westphalia	Turbinenhalle Oberhausen	Tommy End vs. Zack Sabre Jr. in the final of the 2013 16 Carat Gold Tournament	
2014	Chris Hero	2	March 14, 2014	Axel Tischer	Oberhausen, North Rhine-Westphalia	Steffy's Nightclub	Chris Hero vs. Freddy Stahl in the first round of the 2014 16 Carat Gold Tournament	
2014	Chris Hero	2	March 15, 2014	Axel Tischer	Oberhausen, North Rhine-Westphalia	Steffy's Nightclub	Tommy End (c) vs. Jonathan Gresham for the wXw Unified World Wrestling Championship	
2014	Chris Hero	2	March 16, 2014	Axel Tischer	Oberhausen, North Rhine-Westphalia	Steffy's Nightclub	Axel Tischer vs. Chris Hero in the final of the 2014 16 Carat Gold Tournament	
2015	Tommy End	2	March 6, 2015	Axel Dieter Jr.	Oberhausen, North Rhine-Westphalia	Turbinenhalle Oberhausen	Karsten Beck and Melanie Gray vs. The World's Cutest Tag Team (Candice LeRae and Joey Ryan)	
2015	Tommy End	2	March 7, 2015	Axel Dieter Jr.	Oberhausen, North Rhine-Westphalia	Turbinenhalle Oberhausen	Karsten Beck (c) vs. Big Daddy Walter for the wXw Unified World Wrestling Championship	
2015	Tommy End	2	March 8, 2015	Axel Dieter Jr.	Oberhausen, North Rhine-Westphalia	Turbinenhalle Oberhausen	Axel Dieter Jr. vs. Tommy End in the final of the 2015 16 Carat Gold Tournament	
2016	Zack Sabre Jr.	1	March 11, 2016	Axel Dieter Jr.	Oberhausen, North Rhine-Westphalia	Turbinenhalle Oberhausen	Axel Dieter Jr. vs. Marty Scurll in an "I Quit" match in the first round of the 2016 16 Carat Gold Tournament	
2016	Zack Sabre Jr.	1	March 12, 2016	Axel Dieter Jr.	Oberhausen, North Rhine-Westphalia	Turbinenhalle Oberhausen	Karsten Beck (c) vs. Absolute Andy vs. John Klinger vs. Jurn Simmons in a four-way match for the wXw Unified World Wrestling Championship	
2016	Zack Sabre Jr.	1	March 13, 2016	Axel Dieter Jr.	Oberhausen, North Rhine-Westphalia	Turbinenhalle Oberhausen	Axel Dieter Jr. vs. Zack Sabre Jr. in the final of the 2016 16 Carat Gold Tournament	
2017	Ilja Dragunov	1	March 10, 2017	Walter	Oberhausen, North Rhine-Westphalia	Turbinenhalle Oberhausen	David Starr vs. Walter in the first round of the 2017 16 Carat Gold Tournament	
2017	Ilja Dragunov	1	March 11, 2017	Walter	Oberhausen, North Rhine-Westphalia	Turbinenhalle Oberhausen	Axel Dieter Jr. (c) vs. Jurn Simmons for the wXw Unified World Wrestling Championship	
2017	Ilja Dragunov	1	March 12, 2017	Walter	Oberhausen, North Rhine-Westphalia	Turbinenhalle Oberhausen	Ilja Dragunov vs. Walter in the final of the 2017 16 Carat Gold Tournament	
2018	Absolute Andy	1	March 9, 2018	David Starr	Oberhausen, North Rhine-Westphalia	Turbinenhalle Oberhausen	Absolute Andy vs. Marius Al-Ani in the first round of the 2018 16 Carat Gold Tournament	
2018	Absolute Andy	1	March 10, 2018	David Starr	Oberhausen, North Rhine-Westphalia	Turbinenhalle Oberhausen	John Klinger (c) vs. Ilja Dragunov vs. Walter in a three-way match for the wXw Unified World Wrestling Championship	
2018	Absolute Andy	1	March 11, 2018	David Starr	Oberhausen, North Rhine-Westphalia	Turbinenhalle Oberhausen	Absolute Andy vs. David Starr in the final of the 2018 16 Carat Gold Tournament	
2019	Lucky Kid	1	March 8, 2019	Walter	Oberhausen, North Rhine-Westphalia	Turbinenhalle Oberhausen	David Starr vs. Walter in the first round of the 2019 16 Carat Gold Tournament	
2019	Lucky Kid	1	March 9, 2019	Walter	Oberhausen, North Rhine-Westphalia	Turbinenhalle Oberhausen	Absolute Andy (c) vs. Bobby Gunns for the wXw Unified World Wrestling Championship	
2019	Lucky Kid	1	March 10, 2019	Walter	Oberhausen, North Rhine-Westphalia	Turbinenhalle Oberhausen	Lucky Kid vs. Walter in the final of the 2019 16 Carat Gold Tournament	
2020	Cara Noir	1	March 6, 2020	Mike Bailey	Oberhausen, North Rhine-Westphalia	Turbinenhalle Oberhausen	The Pretty Bastards (Maggot and Prince Ahura) (c) vs. Jay-AA (Absolute Andy and Jay Skillet) for the wXw World Tag Team Championship	
2020	Cara Noir	1	March 7, 2020	Mike Bailey	Oberhausen, North Rhine-Westphalia	Turbinenhalle Oberhausen	Bobby Gunns (c) vs. David Starr in a title vs. career match for the wXw Unified World Wrestling Championship	
2020	Cara Noir	1	March 8, 2020	Mike Bailey	Oberhausen, North Rhine-Westphalia	Turbinenhalle Oberhausen	Cara Noir vs. Mike Bailey in the final of the 2020 16 Carat Gold Tournament	
2022	Jonathan Gresham	1	March 4, 2022	Robert Dreissker	Oberhausen, North Rhine-Westphalia	Turbinenhalle Oberhausen	Bobby Gunns vs. Jonathan Gresham in the first round of 2020 16 Carat Gold Tournament	
2022	Jonathan Gresham	1	March 5, 2022	Robert Dreissker	Oberhausen, North Rhine-Westphalia	Turbinenhalle Oberhausen	Axel Tischer (c) vs. Jurn Simmons vs. Levaniel vs. Tristan Archer in a four-way match for the wXw Unified World Wrestling Championship	
2022	Jonathan Gresham	1	March 6, 2022	Robert Dreissker	Oberhausen, North Rhine-Westphalia	Turbinenhalle Oberhausen	Jonathan Gresham vs. Robert Dreissker in the final of the 2022 16 Carat Gold Tournament	
2023	Shigehiro Irie	1	March 10, 2023	Axel Tischer	Oberhausen, North Rhine-Westphalia	Turbinenhalle Oberhausen	Ahura vs. Maggot in the first round of the 2023 16 Carat Gold Tournament	
2023	Shigehiro Irie	1	March 11, 2023	Axel Tischer	Oberhausen, North Rhine-Westphalia	Turbinenhalle Oberhausen	Bobby Gunns (career) vs. Norman Harras (role as Sporting Director) in a career vs. role no disqualification match	
2023	Shigehiro Irie	1	March 12, 2023	Axel Tischer	Oberhausen, North Rhine-Westphalia	Turbinenhalle Oberhausen	Axel Tischer vs. Shigehiro Irie in the final of the 2023 16 Carat Gold Tournament for the vacant wXw Unified World Wrestling Championship	
2024	Laurance Roman	1	March 8, 2024	Peter Tihanyi	Oberhausen, North Rhine-Westphalia	Turbinenhalle Oberhausen	Michael Oku vs. Joseph Fenech Jr. in the first round of the 2024 16 Carat Gold Tournament	
2024	Laurance Roman	1	March 9, 2024	Peter Tihanyi	Oberhausen, North Rhine-Westphalia	Turbinenhalle Oberhausen	Robert Dreissker (c) vs. Shigehiro Irie for the wXw Unified World Wrestling Championship	
2024	Laurance Roman	1	March 10, 2024	Peter Tihanyi	Oberhausen, North Rhine-Westphalia	Turbinenhalle Oberhausen	Laurance Roman vs. Peter Tihanyi in the final of the 2024 16 Carat Gold Tournament	
2025	1 Called Manders	1	March 7, 2025	Ahura	Oberhausen, North Rhine-Westphalia	Turbinenhalle Oberhausen	Leon Slater vs. Aigle Blanc in the first round of the 2025 16 Carat Gold Tournament	
2025	1 Called Manders	1	March 8, 2025	Ahura	Oberhausen, North Rhine-Westphalia	Turbinenhalle Oberhausen	Young Blood (Oskar Leube and Yuto Nakashima) (c) vs. Big Bucks (Alex Duke and Norman Harras) vs. High Performer Ltd. (Anil Marik and Icarus) vs. Planet Gojirah (Marc Empire and Robert Dreissker) in a four-way Tables, Ladders, and Chairs match for the wXw World Tag Team Championship	
2025	1 Called Manders	1	March 9, 2025	Ahura	Oberhausen, North Rhine-Westphalia	Turbinenhalle Oberhausen	1 Called Manders vs. Ahura in the final of the 2025 16 Carat Gold Tournament	
2026	Ahura	1	March 6, 2026	Peter Tihanyi	Oberhausen, North Rhine-Westphalia	Turbinenhalle Oberhausen	Ahura vs. Dennis Dullnig in the first round of the 2026 16 Carat Gold Tournament	
2026	Ahura	1	March 7, 2026	Peter Tihanyi	Oberhausen, North Rhine-Westphalia	Turbinenhalle Oberhausen	Elijah Blum (c) vs. 1 Called Manders for the wXw Unified World Wrestling Championship	
2026	Ahura	1	March 8, 2026	Peter Tihanyi	Oberhausen, North Rhine-Westphalia	Turbinenhalle Oberhausen	Ahura vs. Peter Tihanyi in the final of the 2026 16 Carat Gold Tournament	

== Tournament history ==
=== 2006 ===
The inaugural edition of the tournament took place between January 27 and 29, 2006, in Essen, Germany.

Round 1
Baron Von Hagen	Pin
Iceman	7:45
Ares	16:46
Ian Rotten	Pin
Rocky Romero	Pin
Tengkwa	13:37
Bernard Van Damme	17:05
Doug Williams	Pin
Steve Douglas	Pin
Steve Allison	14:31
Bad Bones	10:09
Tommy End	DQ
Adam Polak	Pin
Hate	10:42
Vries Kastelein	5:17
Murat Bosporus	Pin

Quarterfinals
Baron Von Hagen	Pin
Ian Rotten	12:21
Rocky Romero	19:10
Doug Williams	Pin
Steven Douglas	Pin
Tommy End	11:58
Adam Polak	10:58
Murat Bosporus	Pin

Semifinals
Baron Von Hagen	Pin
Doug Williams	13:23
Steve Douglas	11:08
Murat Bosporus	Pin

Final
Baron Von Hagen	Pin
Murat Bosporus	21:04

=== 2007 ===
The 2007 edition of the event took place between May 4 and 6, in Essen, Germany.

Round 1
Chris Hero	Pin
Claudio Castagnoli	28:29
Matt Sydal	11:17
Ryo Saito	Pin
Go Shiozaki	Pin
Davey Richards	10:30
Steve Douglas	18:18
Murat Bosporus	Pin
El Generico	Pin
Pac	14:45
Emil Sitoci	7:44
Bad Bones	Pin
Nigel McGuinness	Pin
Doug Williams	18:36
Tommy End	3:39
Ares	Pin

Quarterfinals
Chris Hero	Pin
Ryo Saito	16:36
Go Shiozaki	22:46
Murat Bosporus	Pin
El Generico	Pin
Bad Bones	11:36
Nigel McGuinness	14:55
Ares	Pin

Semifinals
Chris Hero	Pin
Murat Bosporus	20:55
El Generico	12:31
Ares	Pin

Final
Chris Hero	Pin
Ares	36:49

=== 2008 ===
The 2008 edition of the event took place between March 7 and 9, in Essen, Germany.

Round 1
Bad Bones	Pin
PCO	11:37
Taiji Ishimori	14:50
El Generico	Pin
Tommy End	Pin
Jimmy Jacobs	10:03
Big Van Walter	9:40
Ares	Pin
Chris Hero	Pin
Absolute Andy	23:08
Chuck Taylor	7:44
Emil Sitoci	Pin
Naomichi Marufuji	Pin
Doug Williams	19:49
Mike Quackenbush	24:01
Bryan Danielson	Pin

Quarterfinals
Bad Bones	Pin
El Generico	12:22
Tommy End	10:49
Ares	Pin
Chris Hero	Pin
Emil Sitoci	17:51
Naomichi Marufuji	19:23
Bryan Danielson	Pin

Semifinals
Bad Bones	Pin
Ares	20:30
Chris Hero	36:47
Bryan Danielson	Pin

Final
Bad Bones	Pin
Bryan Danielson	20:42

=== 2009 ===
The 2009 edition of the event took place between March 6 and 8, in Oberhausen, Germany.

Round 1
Shingo	Pin
Absolute Andy	14:00
Chris Sabin	18:31
Tyler Black	Pin
Bryan Danielson	Pin
Doug Williams	20:55
Terry Frazier	3:59
Zack Sabre Jr.	Pin
Steve Douglas	Pin
Tatsuhito Takaiwa	11:15
Martin Stone	10:05
Daisuke Sekimoto	Pin
Big Van Walter	Pin
Erick Stevens	7:15
Adam Polak	11:27
Drake Younger	Pin

Quarterfinals
Shingo	Pin
Tyler Black	20:20
Bryan Danielson	13:15
Zack Sabre Jr.	Pin
Steve Douglas	Pin
Daisuke Sekimoto	17:03
Big Van Walter	12:15
Drake Younger	Pin

Semifinals
Shingo	Pin
Zack Sabre Jr.	9:27
Steve Douglas	10:54
Drake Younger	Pin

Final
Shingo	Pin
Drake Younger	16:32

=== 2010 ===
The 2010 edition of the event took place between March 5 and 7, in Oberhausen, Germany.

Round 1
Big Van Walter	Pin
Daisuke Sekimoto	15:25
Paul Tracey	6:54
Munenori Sawa	Pin
Kagetora	Pin
Nick Jackson Tommy End	9:34
Adam Polak	10:48
Erick Stevens	Pin
Ares	Pin
Matt Jackson	8:17
Johnny Kidd	12:53
Claudio Castagnoli	Pin
Martin Stone	Pin
Yuji Okabayashi	9:30
Bad Bones	20:59
Chris Hero	Pin

Quarterfinals
Big Van Walter	Pin
Munenori Sawa	10:31
Kagetora	8:38
Erick Stevens	Pin
Ares	Pin
Claudio Castagnoli	15:29
Martin Stone	15:24
Chris Hero	Pin

Semifinals
Big Van Walter	Pin
Erick Stevens	15:49
Ares	22:34
Chris Hero	Pin

Final
Big Van Walter	Pin
Chris Hero	20:56

=== 2011 ===
The 2011 edition of the event took place between March 11 and 13, in Oberhausen, Germany.

Round 1
Sami Callihan	Pin
Tommy End	7:56
Carnage	8:56
Yoshihito Sasaki	Pin
Zack Sabre Jr.	Pin
Colt Cabana	8:23
Jon Ryan	8:16
Davey Richards	Pin
Go Shiozaki	Pin
Johnny Moss	12:45
El Generico	14:55
Kotaro Suzuki	Pin
Mark Haskins	Pin
Adam Cole	6:33
Rico Bushido
Big Van Walter	Pin

Quarterfinals
Sami Callihan	Pin
Yoshihito Sasaki	7:55
Zack Sabre Jr.	13:35
Davey Richards	Pin
Go Shiozaki	Pin
Kotaro Suzuki	17:07
Mark Haskins	8:46
Big Van Walter	Pin

Semifinals
Sami Callihan	Pin
Davey Richards	8:37
Go Shiozaki	18:50
Big Van Walter	Pin

Final
Sami Callihan	Pin
Big Van Walter	13:14

=== 2012 ===
The 2012 edition of the event took place between March 2 and 5, in Oberhausen, Germany.

Round 1
El Generico	Pin
Marty Scurll	19:01
Drake Younger	8:03
Karsten Beck	Pin
Fit Finlay	Pin
Sami Callihan	22:43
Doug Williams	12:28
Johnny Moss	Pin
Zack Sabre Jr.	Pin
Jon Ryan	18:37
Bad Bones	5:49
Yoshihito Sasaki	Pin
Ricky Marvin	Pin
Axeman	16:06
Emil Sitoci	8:50
Tommy End	Pin

Quarterfinals
El Generico	Pin
Karsten Beck	12:41
Fit Finlay	17:29
Johnny Moss	Pin
Zack Sabre Jr.	Pin
Yoshihito Sasaki	7:54
Ricky Marvin	13:22
Tommy End	RD

Semifinals
El Generico	Pin
Johnny Moss	11:00
Zack Sabre Jr.	13:49
Tommy End	RD

Final
El Generico	Pin
Tommy End	18:16

=== 2013 ===
The 2013 edition of the event took place between March 1 and 3, in Oberhausen, Germany.

Round 1
Tommy End	Pin
Ricochet	11:18
Ricky Marvin	11:32
Jonathan Gresham	Pin
Eddie Kingston	Pin
Chuck Taylor	8:04
Bad Bones	8:01
Shinobu	Pin
Karsten Beck	CountOut
Paul Tracey	12:14
Masada	Pin
Super Crazy	13:27
Robert Dreissker	Pin
Yuji Okabayashi	10:03
Johnny Moss	23:03
Zack Sabre Jr.	Pin

Quarterfinals
Tommy End	Pin
Jonathan Gresham	11:25
Eddie Kingston	7:48
Shinobu	Pin
Karsten Beck	Pin
Super Crazy	10:09
Robert Dreissker	7:28
Zack Sabre Jr.	Pin

Semifinals
Tommy End	Pin
Shinobu	6:08
Karsten Beck	16:49
Zack Sabre Jr.	Pin

Final
Tommy End	Pin
Zack Sabre Jr.	13:02

=== 2014 ===
The 2014 edition of the event took place between March 14 and 16, in Oberhausen, Germany.

Round 1
Axel Tischer	Pin
Kushida	14:03
Tommaso Ciampa	9:30
John Klinger	Pin
Johnny Gargano	Pin
Toby Blunt	11:23
Sasa Keel	10:35
Big Daddy Walter	DQ
Adam Cole	Pin
Trent	12:45
Ryuichi Kawakami	7:51
Robert Dreissker	Pin
Karsten Beck	Pin
Matt Striker	11:58
Freddy Stahl	18:41
Chris Hero	Pin

Quarterfinals
Axel Tischer	Pin
John Klinger	22:14
Johnny Gargano	13:33
Big Daddy Walter	Pin
Adam Cole	Pin
Robert Dreissker	8:53
Karsten Beck	13:25
Chris Hero	Pin

Semifinals
Axel Tischer	DQ
Big Daddy Walter	15:48
Adam Cole	14:55
Chris Hero	Pin

Final
Axel Tischer	16:05
Chris Hero	Pin

=== 2015 ===
The 2015 edition of the event took place between March 7 and 9, in Oberhausen, Germany.

Round 1
Tommy End	Pin
Chris Sabin	13:53
Robert Dreissker	7:32
Andrew Everett	Pin
Sasa Keel	Pin
Uhaa Nation	8:30
Sha Samuels	9:45
Absolute Andy	Pin
Zack Sabre Jr.	RD
Axel Tischer	19:43
Kim Ray	9:21
Daisuke Harada	Pin
Marty Scurll	Pin
Cedric Alexander	9:53
Timothy Thatcher	11:49
Axel Dieter Jr.	Pin

Quarterfinals
Tommy End	Pin
Andrew Everett	6:59
Sasa Keel	13:03
Absolute Andy	Pin
Zack Sabre Jr.	Pin
Daisuke Harada	13:54
Marty Scurll	10:25
Axel Dieter Jr.	Pin

Semifinals
Tommy End	Pin
Absolute Andy	9:48
Zack Sabre Jr.	16:29
Axel Dieter Jr.	Pin

Final
Tommy End	Pin
Axel Dieter Jr.	12:07

=== 2016 ===
The 2016 edition of the event took place between March 11 and 13, in Oberhausen, Germany.

Round 1
Zack Sabre Jr.
Big Daddy Walter
Will Ospreay
Shane Strickland
Sami Callihan
Kim Ray
Timothy Thatcher
Sasa Keel
Drew Galloway
Silas Young
Angélico
Trevor Lee
Axel Dieter
Marty Scurll
Ilja Dragunov
Mike Bailey

Quarterfinals
Zack Sabre Jr.
Will Ospreay
Sami Callihan
Timothy Thatcher
Drew Galloway
Angélico
Axel Dieter
Ilja Dragunov

Semifinals
Zack Sabre Jr.
Sami Callihan
Drew Galloway
Axel Dieter

Final
Zack Sabre Jr.
Axel Dieter

=== 2017 ===
The 2017 edition of the event took place between March 10 and 12, in Oberhausen, Germany.

Round 1
Ilja Dragunov	Pin
Avalanche	8:08
Koji Kanemoto	8:11
Timothy Thatcher	Pin
Cody Rhodes	Pin
Da Mack	10:48
Paul London	7:39
John Klinger	Pin
Matt Riddle	Pin
Donovan Dijak	8:50
ACH	14:25
Mike Bailey	Pin
Marius Al-Ani	Pin
J. T. Dunn	7:16
David Starr	16:24
Walter	RD

Quarterfinals
Ilja Dragunov	Pin
Timothy Thatcher	10:43
Cody Rhodes	12:03
John Klinger	Pin
Matt Riddle	Pin
Mike Bailey	7:46
Marius Al-Ani	12:44
Walter	RD

Semifinals
Ilja Dragunov	Pin
John Klinger	10:20
Matt Riddle	9:39
Walter	Pin

Final
Ilja Dragunov	16:09
Walter	Pin

=== 2018 ===
The 2018 edition of the event took place between March 9 and 11, in Oberhausen, Germany.

Round 1
David Starr	Pin
Emil Sitoci	7:53
Mark Haskins	9:02
Travis Banks	Pin
Chris Brookes	Pin
Alexander James	10:22
Avalanche	9:01
Keith Lee	Pin
Timothy Thatcher	Pin
Jonah Rock	10:08
Matt Sydal	12:30
Lucky Kid	Pin
Matt Riddle	Pin
Da Mack	0:12
Marius Al-Ani	14:24
Absolute Andy	Pin

Quarterfinals
David Starr	Pin
Travis Banks	6:19
Chris Brookes	8:39
Keith Lee	Pin
Timothy Thatcher	Pin
Lucky Kid	12:23
Matt Riddle	12:29
Absolute Andy	Pin

Semifinals
David Starr	Pin
Keith Lee	13:19
Timothy Thatcher	13:02
Absolute Andy	Pin

Final
David Starr	22:00
Absolute Andy	Pin

=== 2019 ===
The 2019 edition of the event took place between March 8 and 10, in Oberhausen, Germany.

Round 1
Lucky Kid	Pin
Timothy Thatcher	13:17
Marius Al-Ani	16:42
Axel Dieter Jr.	Pin
Pentagón Jr.	Pin
Mark Davis	7:52
Daisuke Sekimoto	16:36
Ilja Dragunov	Pin
Avalanche	Pin
Jurn Simmons	13:55
Chris Brookes	7:54
Shigehiro Irie	Pin
Fenix	Pin
Rey Horus	7:55
David Starr	16:38
Walter	Pin

Quarterfinals
Lucky Kid	Pin
Axel Dieter Jr.	14:40
Pentagón Jr.	10:38
Ilja Dragunov	Pin
Avalanche	Pin
Shigehiro Irie	7:50
Fenix	11:39
Walter	Pin

Semifinals
Lucky Kid	Pin
Ilja Dragunov	14:11
Avalanche	11:16
Walter	Pin

Final
Lucky Kid	Pin
Walter	19:28

=== 2020 ===
The 2020 edition of the event took place between March 6 and 8, in Oberhausen, Germany.

Round 1
Cara Noir	RD
Marius Al-Ani	11:32
Alexander James	12:44
Jeff Cobb	Pin
The Rotation	Pin
Puma King	8:57
Daniel Makabe	9:33
Eddie Kingston	Pin
Jurn Simmons	Pin
Lucky Kid	4:32
Shigehiro Irie	Pin
Black Taurus	10:30
Julian Pace	9:39
Bandido	Pin
Chris Ridgeway	12:55
Mike Bailey	Pin

Quarterfinals
Cara Noir	Pin
Jeff Cobb	11:40
The Rotation	9:26
Eddie Kingston	Pin
Jurn Simmons	Pin
Shigehiro Irie	9:01
Bandido	17:36
Mike Bailey	Pin

Semifinals
Cara Noir	Pin
Eddie Kingston	8:15
Jurn Simmons	10:40
Mike Bailey	Pin

Final
Cara Noir	RD
Mike Bailey	28:27

=== 2022 ===
The 2022 edition of the event took place between March 4 and 6, in Oberhausen, Germany.

Round 1
Jonathan Gresham	Pin
Bobby Gunns	21:22
Aigle Blanc	13:06
Peter Tihanyi	Pin
Marius Al-Ani	Pin
Michael Knight	8:09
Senza Volto	12:49
Shigehiro Irie	Pin
LuFisto	Pin
Dennis Dullnig	7:45
Ace Romero	12:48
Maggot	Pin
Cara Noir	KO
Vincent Heisenberg	6:26
Fuminori Abe	8:45
Robert Dreissker	Pin

Quarterfinals
Jonathan Gresham	Pin
Peter Tihanyi	7:01
Hektor Invictus (Note: Invictus replaced Marius Al-Ani in the quarterfinals.)	7:14
Shigehiro Irie	Pin
LuFisto	Pin
Maggot	11:49
Cara Noir	9:08
Robert Dreissker	Pin

Semifinals
Jonathan Gresham	Pin
Shigehiro Irie	12:23
LuFisto	5:56
Robert Dreissker	Pin

Final
Jonathan Gresham	Pin
Robert Dreissker	12:45

=== 2023 ===
The 2023 edition of the event took place between March 10 and 12, in Oberhausen, Germany.

Round 1
Shigehiro Irie	Pin
Metehan	16:28
Mike D Vecchio	10:53
Tristan Archer	Pin
Ahura	Pin
Maggot	22:14
Arez	14:10
Komander	Pin
Francesco Akira	Pin
Laurance Roman	11:45
Trey Miguel	13:19
Peter Tihanyi	Pin
Masha Slamovich	Pin
Fuminori Abe	8:50
Davey Richards	16:46
Axel Tischer	Pin

Quarterfinals
Shigehiro Irie	Pin
Tristan Archer	11:45
Ahura	Pin
Komander	11:42
Francesco Akira	14:48
Peter Tihanyi	Pin
Masha Slamovich	10:16
Axel Tischer	Decision

Semifinals
Shigehiro Irie	Pin
Ahura	9:13
Peter Tihanyi	12:38
Axel Tischer	Pin

Final
Shigehiro Irie	Pin
Axel Tischer	17:23 (Note: This was also for the vacant wXw Unified World Wrestling Championship.)

=== 2024 ===
The 2024 edition of the event took place between March 8 and 10, in Oberhausen, Germany.

Round 1
Laurance Roman	Pin
OSKAR	8:37
Elijah Blum	11:03
Masato Tanaka	Pin
Stephanie Maze	Pin
Icarus	9:33
Luke Jacobs	10:13
1 Called Manders	Pin
Aigle Blanc	Pin
Lio Rush	10:30
Gringo Loco	17:03
Mike D Vecchio	Pin
Michael Oku	Sub
Joseph Fenech Jr.	22:32
Hijo de Dr. Wagner Jr	16:39
Peter Tihanyi	Count-Out

Quarterfinals
Laurance Roman	Pin
Masato Tanaka	11:17
Stephanie Maze	9:28
1 Called Manders	Pin
Aigle Blanc	Pin
Mike D. Vecchio	13:46
Michael Oku	17:01
Peter Tihanyi	Pin

Semifinals
Laurance Roman	Pin
1 Called Manders	9:43
Aigle Blanc	12:30
Peter Tihanyi	Pin

Final
Laurance Roman	Pin
Peter Tihanyi	15:52

=== 2026 ===
The 2026 edition of the event took place between March 6 and 8, in Oberhausen, Germany.

Round 1
Ahura	Pin
Dennis Dullnig	26:16
Dieter Schwarz	9:19
Tetsuya Naito	Pin
Zoltan	Pin
Bushi	7:29
Chihiro Hashimoto	8:25
Thomas Shire	Pin
Yamato	Pin
Axel Tischer	16:20
Bobby Gunns	12:02
Erick Stevens	Pin
Alan Angels	Pin
Titus Alexander	11:17
Arez	10:33
Peter Tihanyi	Pin

Quarterfinals
Ahura	Pin
Tetsuya Naito	16:03
Zoltan	8:43
Thomas Shire	Pin
Yamato	Pin
Erick Stevens	11:20
Alan Angels	13:37
Peter Tihanyi	Pin

Semifinals
Ahura	Pin
Thomas Shire	16:25
Yamato	11:49
Peter Tihanyi	Pin

Final
Ahura	Pin
Peter Tihanyi	21:08
