= 16 Carat Gold Tournament (2025) =

2025 professional wrestling tournament by wXw

- Promotional poster of the event
- Promotion: Westside Xtreme Wrestling
- Date: Night One: March 7, 2025; Night Two: March 8, 2025; Night Three: March 9, 2025
- City: Oberhausen, North Rhine-Westphalia, Germany
- Venue: Turbinenhalle Oberhausen
- Attendance: Night 1: 873; Night 2: 1023; Night 3: 901

Event chronology
← Previous; Dead End	Next → Fans Appreciation Night

16 Carat Gold Tournament chronology
← Previous; 2024	Next → 2026

The 2025 16 Carat Gold Tournament was a professional wrestling tournament produced by Westside Xtreme Wrestling (wXw). It was a three-night event held on March 7–9, 2025 at the Turbinenhalle Oberhausen in Oberhausen, North Rhine-Westphalia, Germany. It was the nineteenth edition of the 16 Carat Gold Tournament. The event was streamed live on TrillerTV.

1 Called Manders won the 2025 tournament by defeating Ahura in the final. Apart from the tournament, various championship matches were contested throughout the three-night event. Mike D Vecchio retained the wXw European Championship against Levaniel on night two and Leon Slater on night three. The wXw World Tag Team Championship changed hands as Big Bucks (Alex Duke and Norman Harras) defeated the defending champions Young Blood (Oskar Leube and Yuto Nakashima), High Performer Ltd. (Anil Marik and Icarus) and Planet Gojirah (Marc Empire and Robert Dreissker) in a Tables, Ladders and Chairs match on night two.

== Production ==
=== Background ===
16 Carat Gold Tournament is an annual knockout tournament produced by wXw, first held in 2006. The tournament features a total of sixteen wrestlers (an exception being the 2010 edition where seventeen competitors participated) and a winner receives a title shot at the wXw Unified World Wrestling Championship at any place and time of their choosing.

=== Storylines ===
The event included matches that resulted from scripted storylines. Results were predetermined by wXw's writers, while storylines were produced on wXw's streaming television show We Love Wrestling.

==== Tournament matches ====
wXw began announcing participants for the 2025 16 Carat Gold Tournament in late 2024. Some of the participants originally announced were: Masha Slamovich, Michael Oku, Joseph Fenech Jr., Dragon Kid, Ahura, 1 Called Manders, Adam Priest, Psycho Clown, Leon Slater, and Daisuke Sekimoto. However, Dragon Kid suffered an injury and was replaced by Masaaki Mochizuki in the tournament.

On the February 8 episode of We Love Wrestling, Bobby Gunns won a Road to 16 Carat Gold Tournament to qualify for the tournament as the final participant.

On March 1, wXw announced that a Four Way Dance would determine an alternate participant to fill in for injured competitors in the 16 Carat Gold Tournament. Competitors announced for the match were Hektor Invictus, Nick Schreier, Ryan Clancy, and Stephanie Maze.

==== Other matches ====
Miyu Yamashita from Tokyo Joshi Pro Wrestling was announced for a match on the night three of 16 Carat Gold Tournament. Anita Vaughan was confirmed as Yamashita's opponent on the March 9 episode of We Love Wrestling.

At Dead End, Levaniel attacked Mike D Vecchio after the latter won a match against Ahura. This led to a match between Vecchio and Levaniel for the former's wXw European Championship on the night two of 16 Carat Gold Tournament.

After months of feuding between the four teams, including a backstage brawl at the Dead End pre-show, it was announced that Young Blood (Oskar Leube and Yuto Nakashima) would defend the wXw World Tag Team Championship against Big Bucks (Alex Duke and Norman Harras), High Performer Ltd. (Anil Marik and Icarus), and Planet Gojirah (Marc Empire and Robert Dreissker) in a Tables, Ladders and Chairs match on the night two of 16 Carat Gold Tournament.

==== Cancelled match ====
Peter Tihanyi and Elijah Blum feuded with each other over the wXw Unified World Wrestling Championship since late 2024 after Tihanyi won the title. Blum failed to win the title on several occasions, but defeated Tihanyi in a non-title Cage Fighting match at Back to the Roots. As a result of the win, Tihanyi was scheduled to defend the title against Blum in the main event of night two of the 16 Carat Gold Tournament. However, Tihanyi suffered a shoulder injury in February, forcing him to vacate the title.

== Results ==
Night 1
No.	Results	Stipulations	Times
1^{P}	Hektor Invictus defeated Nick Schreier, Ryan Clancy, and Stephanie Maze	Four Way Dance to determine an alternate participant in 16 Carat Gold Tournament	6:28
2	Ahura defeated Michael Oku	Singles match in the first round of 16 Carat Gold Tournament	13:30
3	Bobby Gunns defeated Anita Vaughan	Singles match in the first round of 16 Carat Gold Tournament	11:39
4	Axel Tischer defeated Masaaki Mochizuki	Singles match in the first round of 16 Carat Gold Tournament	9:14
5	Laurance Roman defeated Adam Priest	Singles match in the first round of 16 Carat Gold Tournament	13:27
6	Masha Slamovich defeated Cara Noir	Singles match in the first round of 16 Carat Gold Tournament	11:10
7	Psycho Clown defeated Joseph Fenech Jr. (with Robin Christopher Fohrwerk)	Singles match in the first round of 16 Carat Gold Tournament	12:45
8	1 Called Manders defeated Daisuke Sekimoto	Singles match in the first round of 16 Carat Gold Tournament	9:33
9	Leon Slater defeated Aigle Blanc	Singles match in the first round of 16 Carat Gold Tournament	22:04
P / – the match was broadcast on the pre-show

Night 2
No.	Results	Stipulations	Times
1^{P}	Masaaki Mochizuki defeated Adam Priest	Singles match	9:11
2	Elijah Blum defeated Cara Noir	Singles match	12:46
3	Laurance Roman defeated Axel Tischer	Singles match in the quarter-final round of the 16 Carat Gold Tournament	17:58
4	Masha Slamovich defeated Bobby Gunns	Singles match in the quarter-final round of the 16 Carat Gold Tournament	10:19
5	Aigle Blanc, Daisuke Sekimoto and Michael Oku defeated Hektor Invictus, Nick Schreier and Thomas Shire	Six-man tag team match	16:36
6	Ahura defeated Psycho Clown	Singles match in the quarter-final round of the 16 Carat Gold Tournament	20:13
7	1 Called Manders defeated Leon Slater	Singles match in the quarter-final round of the 16 Carat Gold Tournament	14:58
8	Mike D Vecchio (c) defeated Levaniel	Singles match for the wXw European Championship	1:12
9	Big Bucks (Alex Duke and Norman Harras) defeated Young Blood (Oskar Leube and Yuto Nakashima) (c), High Performer Ltd. (Anil Marik and Icarus) (with Robin Christopher Fohrwerk) and Planet Gojirah (Marc Empire and Robert Dreissker)	Four-way Tables, Ladders and Chairs match for the wXw World Tag Team Championship	25:41
(c) / – the champion(s) heading into the match; P / – the match was broadcast on the pre-show

Night 3
No.	Results	Stipulations	Times
1	1 Called Manders defeated Masha Slamovich	Singles match in the semi-final round of the 16 Carat Gold Tournament	8:46
2	Ahura defeated Laurance Roman	Singles match in the semi-final round of the 16 Carat Gold Tournament	11:36
3	Miyu Yamashita defeated Anita Vaughan	Singles match	13:32
4	Aigle Blanc, Michael Oku and Psycho Clown defeated Masaaki Mochizuki, Psycho Mike and Zozaya	Lucha Rules six-man tag team match	18:57
5	Mike D Vecchio (c) defeated Leon Slater	Singles match for the wXw European Championship	15:07
6	Elijah Blum and Planet Gojirah (Marc Empire and Robert Dreissker) defeated Astronauts (Fuminori Abe and Takuya Nomura) and Daisuke Sekimoto	Six-man tag team match	17:09
7	1 Called Manders defeated Ahura	16 Carat Gold Tournament final	13:42
(c) / – the champion(s) heading into the match

== Tournament brackets ==
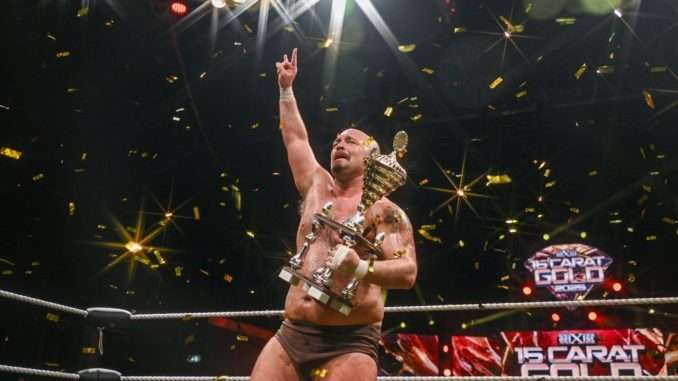
1 Called Manders after winning the 2025 16 Carat Gold Tournament.

Round 1
Axel Tischer	Pin
Masaaki Mochizuki	9:15
Laurance Roman	Pin
Adam Priest	13:27
Ahura	Pin
Michael Oku	13:31
Psycho Clown	Pin
Joseph Fenech Jr.	12:46
Bobby Gunns	Pin
Anita Vaughan	11:40
Masha Slamovich	Pin
Cara Noir	11:14
1 Called Manders	Pin
Daisuke Sekimoto	9:33
Leon Slater	Pin
Aigle Blanc	22:05

Quarterfinals
Axel Tischer	10:00
Laurance Roman	Pin
Ahura	Pin
Psycho Clown	20:15
Bobby Gunns	Pin
Masha Slamovich	10:00
1 Called Manders	Pin
Leon Slater	14:58

Semifinals
Laurance Roman	11:36
Ahura	Pin
Masha Slamovich	8:48
1 Called Manders	Pin

Final
Ahura	13:42
1 Called Manders	Pin
