= Karsten Beck =

German professional wrestler (1986–2020)

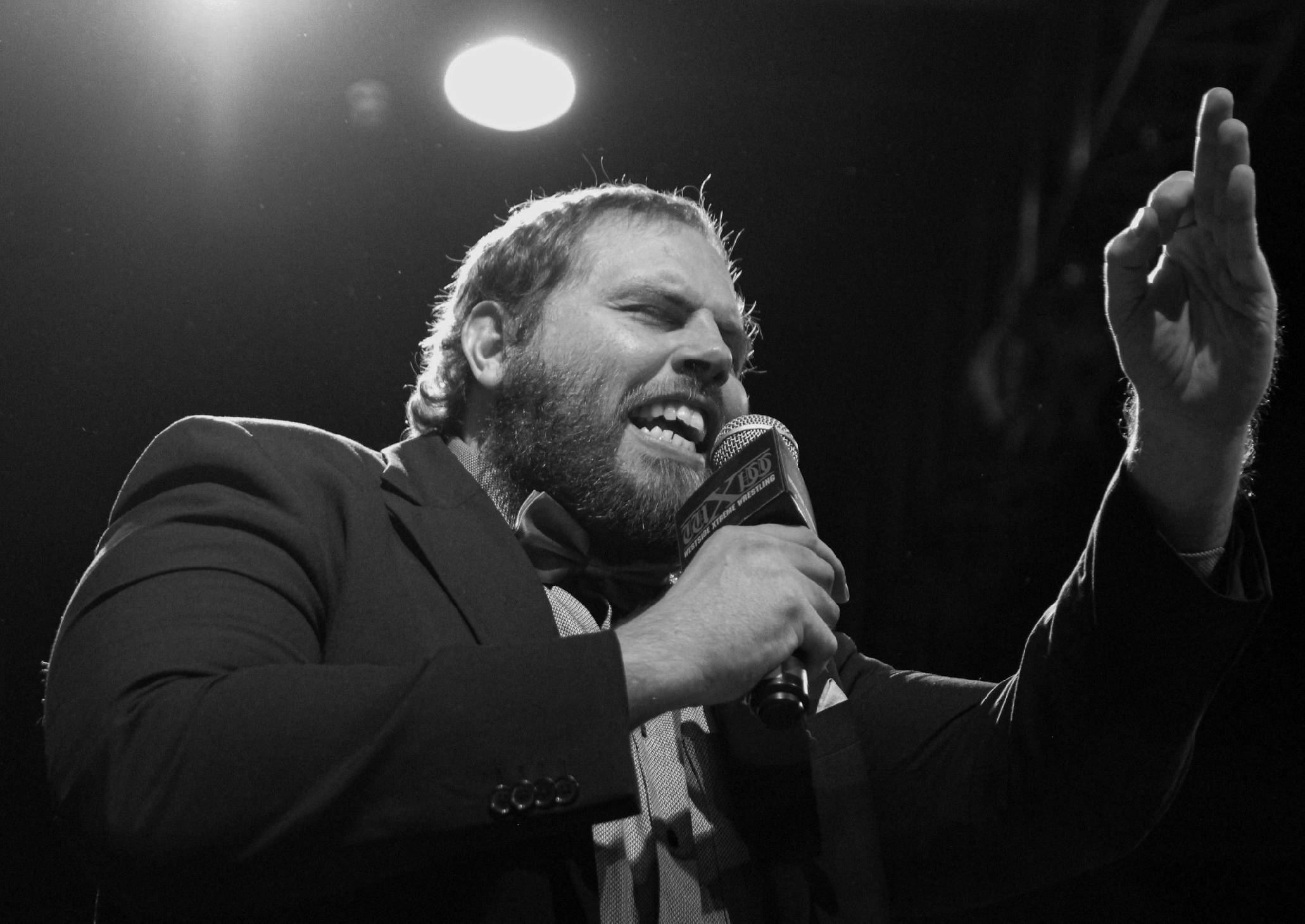
- Beck in October 2019, at World Tag Team Festival

Personal information
- Born: Karsten Pitann; 25 November 1986 Wesel, West Germany
- Died: 15 October 2020 (aged 33)
- Cause of death: Brain cancer

Professional wrestling career
- Ring name(s): Diego Latino; Herr Karsten Beck; Karsten Beck; Masked Destroyer VI; Pizmark Jr.
- Billed height: 5 ft 11 in (1.80 m)
- Billed weight: 233 lb (106 kg)
- Trained by: Hate; Westside Dojo
- Debut: 2006
- Retired: 2016

Karsten Pitann (25 November 1986 – 15 October 2020), better known by his ring name Karsten Beck, was a German professional wrestler. He was best known for his work with Westside Xtreme Wrestling (wXw).

In wXw, Beck was a two-time Unified World Wrestling Champion, and apart from John Klinger's one-day reign, he was the champion for over a year from January 2015 to March 2016. Beck was also a one-time World Tag Team Champion, alongside Adam Polak. He worked as a heel during his most successful years with wXw, and became known for cheating to win his matches. In 2016, Beck was forced to retire after being diagnosed with a brain tumour, and having turned face, he was later used as the director of sports, the promotion's authority figure, for the next four years. He died in October 2020 from brain cancer.

== Career ==
Pitann debuted in 2006, portraying a luchador enmascarado character, named Diego Latino. During this time, he was part of the La Familia stable where he frequently teamed in different German promotions with Baca Loco, whose mask he won in July 2008. He then began regularly appearing for Westside Xtreme Wrestling (wXw), under the ring name Karsten Beck. However, it was not until 2011, when he joined The Mind, a stable led by Adam Polak, that he had more of a prominent role. In March 2011, he and Polak defeated Oberhausen Terror Corps (Bad Bones and Carnage) to become World Tag Team Champions, enjoying a seven-month reign. Beck and Big Van Walter (Polak's replacement) dropped the title in Mannheim to The Wanderers (Jason Hendrix and Jay Skillet), who were used as transitional champions, in order to get the title onto the Sumerian Death Squad (Michael Dante and Tommy End), a tag team previously associated with The Mind. The following year saw him reach the quarter-final of 16 Carat Gold, in which he almost got away with cheating to beat El Generico, and during the summer was involved in title shots for Generico's Unified World Wrestling Championship. In 2013, Beck reached the semi-final of 16 Carat Gold, where he was defeated by Zack Sabre Jr.; it would turn out to be his career best in the tournament. By the end of the year, he started teaming with Sha Samuels, which continued into 2014, but they were only granted one title shot, in a defeat to Hot & Spicy (Axel Dieter Jr. and Da Mack). In October, Beck participated in World Triangle League, a round robin tournament in conjunction with Big Japan Wrestling (BJW) and Combat Zone Wrestling (CZW), where he won the final in a three-way match with Biff Busick and Rich Swann. At Back to the Roots, Beck sided with Vince Russo, and talked his way into a title shot for Big Daddy Walter's Unified World Wrestling Championship. He won the title after interference from Russo and Samuels, with the former revealing his own referee shirt and then lackadaisically counting the pin. Russo later identified Beck as a homegrown wrestler that the promotion should build themselves around, and his reign lasted 223 days, until he was defeated by John Klinger at the Fans Appreciation Night in Hamburg. The next day, Beck won the title back from Klinger, in a three-way match also involving New Japan Pro-Wrestling (NJPW) representative A. J. Styles. His second reign lasted 196 days, when he was defeated at 16 Carat Gold by his former tag partner, Jurn Simmons, in a four-way match also involving Klinger and Absolute Andy. Beck left his boots in the ring and did not return until Shortcut to the Top, where he turned face and was the surprise 30th entrant, eliminating Simmons and shortly afterward, Dieter to win the match. The resulting match between the two men ultimately did not take place as Beck was diagnosed with a brain tumour, and he had to have surgery to have it removed. Beck was then used in an on-screen role, as the director of sports, the promotion's authority figure. In 2017, Beck was involved in a storyline with general manager Christian Michael Jakobi, which would have led him to come out of retirement, but this was shelved when he made an announcement that the tumour had returned. Later that year, he was inducted into the promotion's Hall of Fame. He remained in his role as director of sports for the next three years, and was replaced by Absolute Andy during Germany's handling of the COVID-19 pandemic, as he was considered susceptible from contracting coronavirus.

== Death ==
On 15 October 2020, Pitann died at the age of 33, following his four-year battle with brain cancer.

== Championships and accomplishments ==
- Flemish Wrestling Force
  - FWF Tag Team Championship (1 time) – with Baca Loco (1)
- Freestyle Championship Wrestling Deutschland
  - Deutsche Meisterschaft Championship (1 time)
- German Stampede Wrestling
  - GSW World Heavyweight Championship (1 time)
- German Wrestling Promotion
  - WrestlingCorner.de Championship (1 time)
- Swiss Championship Wrestling
  - SCW Heavyweight Championship (1 time)
- Westside Xtreme Wrestling
  - wXw Unified World Wrestling Championship (2 times)
  - wXw World Tag Team Championship (1 time) – with Adam Polak (1)
  - World Triangle League (2014)
  - wXw Hall of Fame (Class of 2017)

== Luchas de Apuestas record ==
Winner (wager)	Loser (wager)	Location	Event	Date	Notes
Diego Latino (mask)	Baca Loco (mask)	Krefeld, North Rhine-Westphalia, Germany	Westside Dojo Fuck Steve Venom	July 28, 2008	
