= Gunther (wrestler) =

Austrian professional wrestler (born 1987)

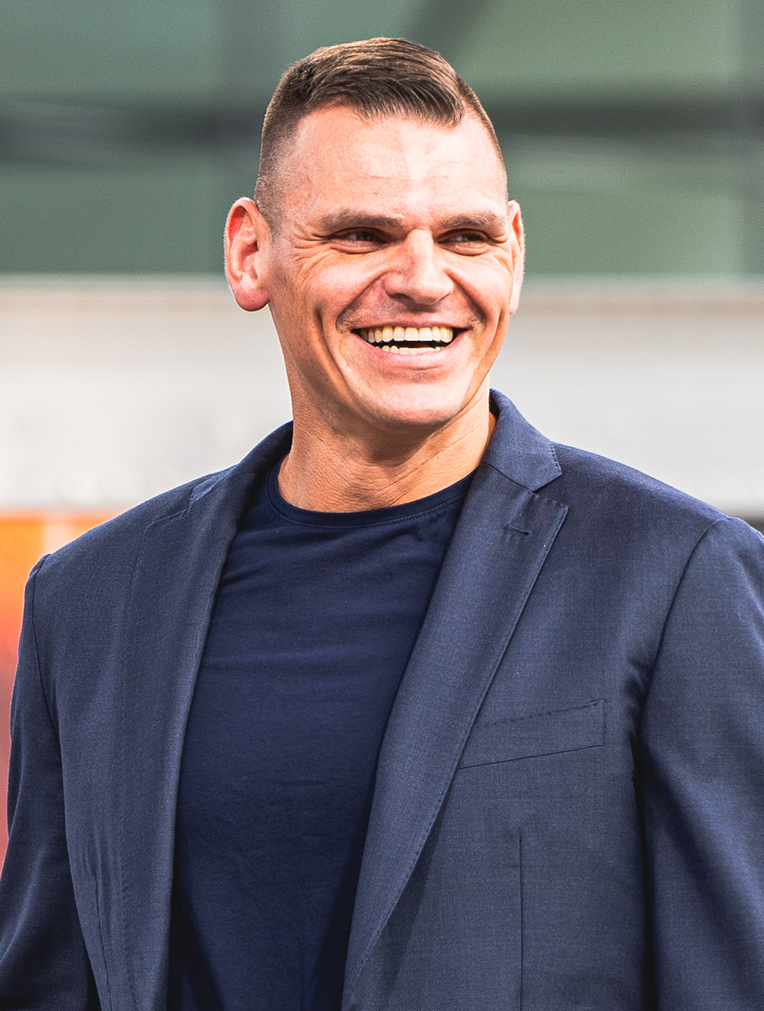
- Gunther in 2024

Personal information
- Born: Walter Hahn; 20 August 1987 (age 39) Vienna, Austria
- Spouse: Jinny Sandhu (m. 2022)
- Children: 1

Professional wrestling career
- Ring name(s): Big Daddy Walter; Big Van Walter; Herr Shark; Gha-cha-ping; Gunther; Walter
- Billed height: 6 ft 4 in (193 cm)
- Billed weight: 250 lb (113 kg)
- Billed from: Vienna, Austria
- Trained by: Michael Kovac; Riki Choshu; Tatsuhito Takaiwa; Tomohiro Ishii
- Debut: 19 November 2005

Walter Hahn (born 20 August 1987) is an Austrian professional wrestler. He is signed to WWE, where he performs on the SmackDown brand under the ring name Gunther. He is a former two-time World Heavyweight Champion, and the longest reigning WWE Intercontinental and NXT United Kingdom champion in company history.

Hahn first became known under the ring names Big Van Walter, Big Daddy Walter, and Walter during his tenure in Germany in Westside Xtreme Wrestling (wXw) and various German independent promotions. Early in his career, he competed in Japan for Big Japan Pro-Wrestling (BJW) and Pro Wrestling ZERO1 under the Big Van Walter gimmick, as well as the short-lived Gha-Cha-Ping. In wXw, he became a three-time wXw Unified World Wrestling Champion and a four-time wXw World Tag Team Champion. He was one of the promotion's most respected figures throughout his tenure, leading him to become the head trainer of the wXw Wrestling Academy from 2015 to 2020. He also became a popular figure on the British, Irish, and American independent circuits, competing in promotions such as Progress Wrestling, Pro Wrestling Guerrilla (PWG), and Over the Top Wrestling (OTT), where he held their respective world championships between 2018 and 2019.

In 2018, Hahn signed with WWE and was assigned to its NXT UK brand, the British sister brand of its American developmental brand NXT. He established Imperium, the succeeding stable to the independent stable Ringkampf, which he founded in 2016. He soon won the NXT United Kingdom Championship against Pete Dunne, and held it for 870 days, the championship's longest reign and the eighth overall longest singles title reign for any WWE championship. In January 2022, he moved to the NXT brand, where his ring name was changed to Gunther. He moved to the main roster on the SmackDown brand three months later, winning the WWE Intercontinental Championship once and holding it for 666 days to set the record for both the longest singular reign with the title and the most cumulative days as champion, as well as the 10th longest singles championship reign of any WWE title. He later became the 24th King of the Ring and won the World Heavyweight Championship twice. He was the final opponent for Goldberg, John Cena, and AJ Styles in their retirement matches, defeating all three and earning the moniker of the "Career Killer".

== Early life ==
Walter Hahn was born in Vienna on 20 August 1987. He became interested in professional wrestling at a young age when a friend taped numerous World Wrestling Federation (WWF, now WWE) shows from 1992 to 1996 on the RTL channels, and kept tapes of shows from promotions such as All Japan Pro Wrestling (AJPW), and let Hahn borrow them. Hahn soon started collecting his own tapes of professional wrestling matches. He was also a spectator for a number of catch wrestling shows in Vienna at an early age, seeing wrestlers such as Fit Finlay, William Regal, and Robbie Brookside at said shows. At the same time, he was interested in football and played as a goalkeeper, but stopped playing around the age of 15. He went back to watching professional wrestling during the Attitude Era and became inspired enough to start training in Vienna under Michael Kovac, a wrestler from Linz, at Wrestling School Austria. According to Hahn, Kovac made him and the other students practice amateur wrestling to benefit their overall professional wrestling abilities, and would charge €35 for private lessons.

== Professional wrestling career ==
=== Early career (2005–2006) ===
From the beginning of his career in 2005 until 2014, Hahn went by the ring name Big Van Walter. The name was a direct reference to Big Van Vader, but it was not a homage. According to Hahn, commentator Mark Landauer gave him the name, and Landauer went on to tell promoters that Hahn's stage name would be Big Van Walter, which annoyed Hahn. Hahn had his first recorded wrestling match on 19 November 2005 in Bern, competing in a tag team match alongside SigMasta Rappo (who, at the time, was under the ring-name Sigi The SwissTank); they lost to the High Class Catch Club (Baron von Hagen and Adam Polak). At the time of this match, Walter was 18 years old. He had his first singles match on 25 March 2006 in Bad Vöslau, defeating Sigi The SwissTank. In the early months of his career, he had his first matches with future rivals and wXw colleagues John Klinger and Absolute Andy, as well as competing in matches with the likes of Colt Cabana, Pac and "Bambikiller" Chris Raaber.

=== Japan (2006–2012, 2019) ===
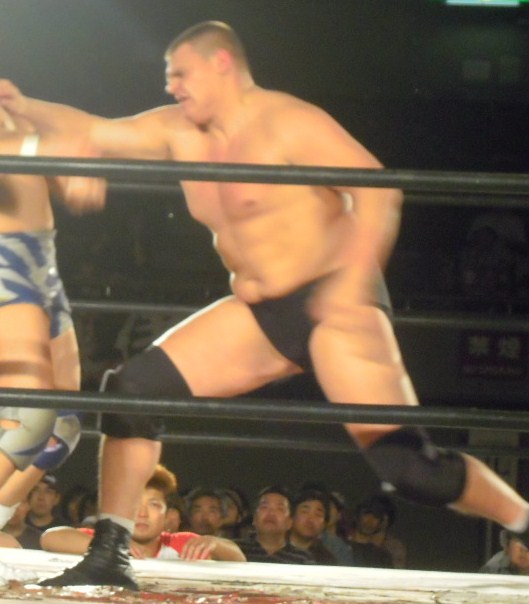
Hahn as Big Van Walter at a BJW show in May 2012, delivering a backhand chop to Yoshihito Sasaki

According to Hahn, he wanted to initially hone his skills and train further in the United States; however, Chris Raaber wanted him to train in Japan due to the similarities within one of Raaber's trainers, Dory Funk Jr., and current puroresu trainers. Raaber reached out to Pro Wrestling ZERO1-MAX, the founded promotion of Shinya Hashimoto and Shinjiro Otani, and asked if Hahn could train with ZERO1-MAX and its heavyweight trainers, which consisted of Riki Choshu and his protege Tomohiro Ishii, and Tatsuhito Takaiwa. Hahn began training at the ZERO1-MAX dojo, which had also been a training facility used by members of the HUSTLE and Pride Fighting Championship rosters, in December 2006. Hahn was assigned the gimmick of Gha-cha-ping, the off-shoot wrestling gimmick of Hirake! Ponkikki character Gachapin.

For the gimmick, Hahn had his hair dyed green and wore a mask to the ring, complete with a light green singlet with yellow and pink lines in the center, contrasting to Gachapin. He made his debut as Gha-cha-ping on 17 January 2007, teaming with Raaber (as Bambikiller) to defeat Otani and Rikiya Fudo. For two days afterwards, Hahn defeated Fudo in singles matches and then Fuyujirou Jidosha. His first loss as the gimmick came on 10 February, losing to Kohei Sato in Hiroshima; he lost to him again in Nagano on 19 February as well. His last match on the tour took place on 7 April, defeating Jidosha, as Jiro Kuruma, at the Yasukuni Shrine Sumo Wrestling Place in Tokyo. Hahn returned to Japan in 2008, ditching the Gha-cha-ping gimmick and going as Big Van Walter, for two shows for the Makehen promotion. First, on 19 March, he teamed with Lance Archer, who went by his real name Lance Hoyt, losing to Masato Shibata (the future Mad Paulie) and Tomohiko Hashimoto. On 28 March, he teamed with Daisuke Sekimoto to defeat Shibata and Hashimoto.

In the midst of his run in wXw in 2011, Hahn took part in numerous shows with their main Japanese partner at the time, Big Japan Pro Wrestling. At Korakuen Hall, on 28 April, he defeated then-rookie Ryuichi Kawakami. Four days later, on 2 May, he defeated Daisuke Sekimoto to win the wXw Unified World Wrestling Championship, his second reign overall. In Yokohama, on 5 May, he teamed with Combat Zone Wrestling (CZW) owner D. J. Hyde to defeat Abdullah Kobayashi and Shadow WX. He returned to Japan in April 2012, teaming with Sekimoto to defeat Yoshihito Sasaki and BJW Strong ace Yuji Okabayashi. On 5 May 2012, Walter was defeated by Sasaki in a match to crown the inaugural BJW World Strong Heavyweight champion in Yokohama, a defeat considered vengeful for Sasaki as Walter had defeated him in a Unified World Wrestling Championship defense a year prior.

In July 2007, Hahn took part in an inter-promotional tour with BJW, wXw and CZW wrestlers on a "World Triangle Night" showcase tour. The first match of the tour for Walter, on 27 July, involved him and fellow wXw wrestlers Robert Dreissker and "Bad Bones" John Klinger losing to Okabayashi, Sekimoto and Sasaki. Walter and Dreissker, who would later be known as the AUTsiders in Europe, defeated Sasaki and Shinya Ishikawa a day later. On 29 July, he and Klinger defeated Okabayashi and Sekimoto, and then defeated Okabayashi in a singles match hours later. On 30 July, he and Dreissker failed to win the wXw World Tag Team Championships, losing to the Sumerian Death Squad (Tommy End and Michael Dante). In late 2019, it was announced that Walter would compete at BJW's Ryogokutan 2019 show, at the Ryōgoku Kokugikan, where he would team with Sekimoto to face Okabayashi and Yuji Hino. Sekimoto and Walter won the match.

=== Westside Xtreme Wrestling (2007–2021) ===
==== Early beginnings (2007–2014) ====
Immediately following his tour in ZERO1-MAX, Walter made his Westside Xtreme Wrestling (wXw) debut on 4 May 2007 as Big Van Walter. In March 2010, Walter won the 16 Carat Gold tournament. At 22 years old, he became the youngest winner of the tournament at the time. He won the Unified World Wrestling Championship defeating Zack Sabre Jr. via disqualification. Within this time, Walter began to form an alliance with the Sumerian Death Squad (Tommy End and Michael Dante) as "The Mind". Walter lost the Unified World Wrestling Championship to Daisuke Sekimoto on 15 January 2011, but regained it on 2 May, during a Big Japan Pro Wrestling card in Tokyo's Shin-Kiba 1st Ring. He lost the title on 19 May 2012, against El Generico.

At 16 Carat Gold 2012, Walter started a partnership with fellow Austrian wrestler Robert Dreissker, being dubbed "The AUTsiders" later on. Walter and Dreissker defeated Jay Skillet and Jonathan Gresham to win the wXw World Tag Team Championship at day three of 16 Carat Gold on 3 March 2013, a day after Walter failed to win his third Unified World Wrestling Championship against Axel Tischer. Their first defense of the titles came at the Hasta La Victoria Siempre Tour Finale, where they would defeat the Sumerian Death Squad and the Leaders Of The New School (Zack Sabre Jr. and Marty Scurll). During the reign they would successfully defend against the teams of Masashi Takeda and Drake Younger, Skillet and Ricky Marvin, D. J. Hyde and Karsten Beck (two allies of the tag team), and Maxi Schneider and Michael Schenkenberg. They would later lose the titles at 258 days in Hamburg during the 13th Anniversary tour to Hot & Spicy (Axel Dieter Jr. and Da Mack).

In October 2013, Walter competed at a ceremonial World Triangle League tournament with CZW and BJW wrestlers. He was one of three wXw qualifying wrestlers (alongside Dreiskker and John Klinger). Walter lost his block by losing to eventual overall winner Daisuke Sekimoto on the third day of the tournament after defeating Drake Younger and Kim Ray on the first and second days respectively.

==== Ringkampf (2014–2018) ====
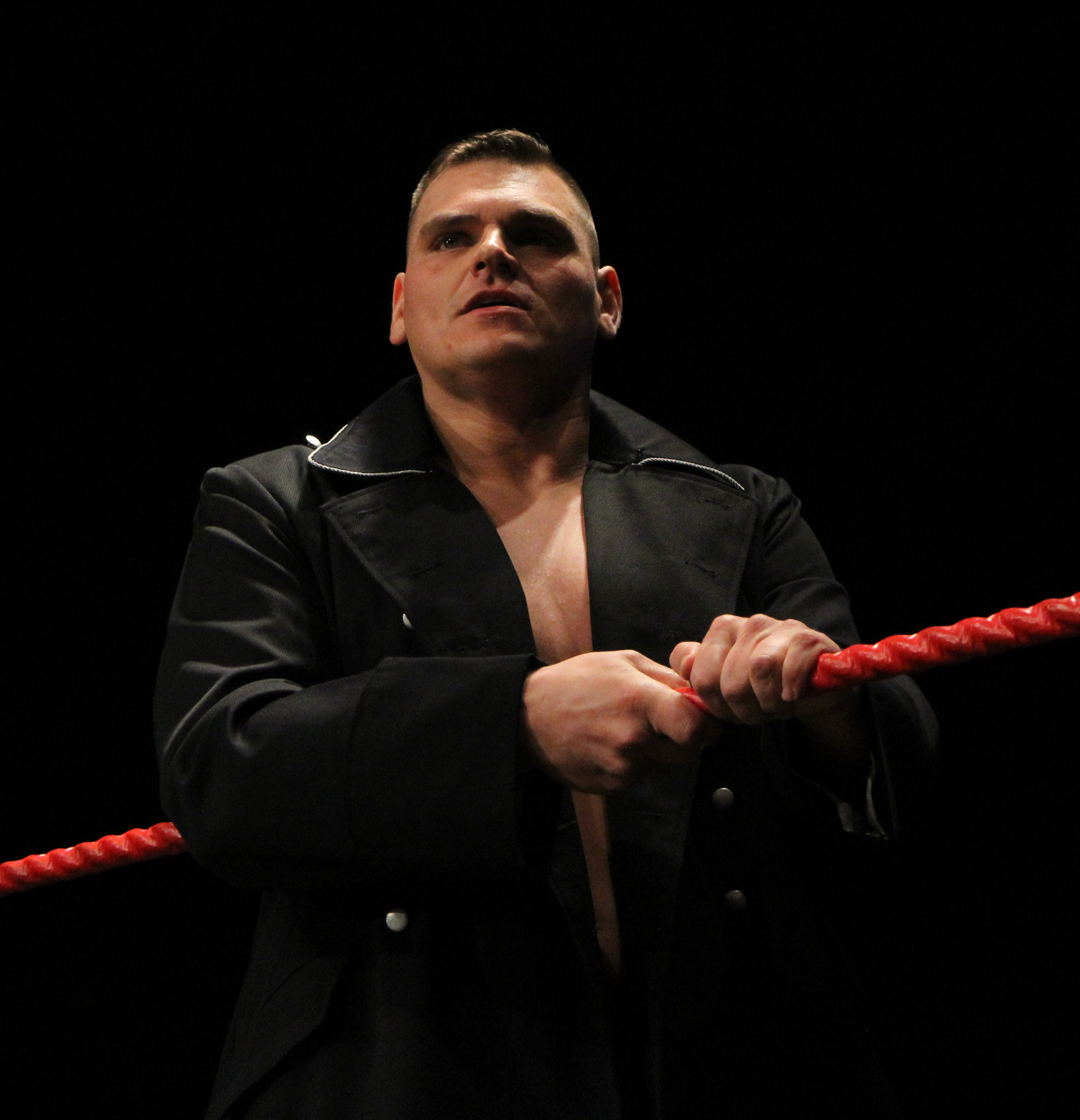
Walter as his "Ring General" gimmick at the 16 Carat Gold Tournament Sunday show on 8 March 2020

In 2014, Walter changed his ring name to Big Daddy Walter, winning his third Unified World Wrestling Championship on July after he defeated Tommy End. He lost the title against Karsten Beck in January 2015, after 174 days as champion, in a match where Vince Russo appeared as the special referee and planned a screwjob against Walter.

In 2015, Walter, alongside Axel Dieter Jr., Axel Tischer and Christian Michael Jakobi, the then-head booker and managing director of wXw, released an apparel brand entitled Ringkampf (German: ring fight). Its apparel became worn by Walter, Dieter and Tischer throughout 2015 and 2016. In 2016, however, Ringkampf evolved into a full-on stable. For months, Walter appeared to have an alliance with American wrestler Timothy Thatcher, who shared a similar style to Walter. After Dieter, Walter and Thatcher began appearing aligned with each other in August of that year in the lead up to the World Tag Team League that'd happen between 31 October and 2 November, the three, along with Jakobi, created the Ringkampf stable and began sharing its motto, "Die Matte Ist Heilig" (German: "The Mat is Sacred"). The philosophy of Ringkampf was that they would only care about the scarcity of professional wrestling and the stable's superiority over all. Walter began to incorporate the nickname "The Ring General" within this time period. Thatcher and Walter were allied together to compete at the World Tag Team League; they defeated Moustache Mountain and Los Güeros del Cielo on the first and third days of the weekend, and lost to JML (David Starr and Shane Strickland) on the second day, failing to reach the finals. Nevertheless, the team of Walter and Dieter were granted a wXw World Tag Team Championship match at the 16th Anniversary show on 10 December, against the incumbent champions, A4 (Absolute Andy and Marius Al-Ani), in a two-out-of-three falls match, which they lost two falls to one.

At a show in London on 28 January 2017, Walter lost a top contendership match to Jurn Simmons. Afterwards, Ringkampf started a series of matches with A4, who had been rivalrous to Ringkampf since the latter's World Tag Team League run. Between 11 and 24 February, Ringkampf and A4, who also competed alongside Simmons and Günter Schmid, had their overall match series tied 2-2, notably after Ringkampf's Dieter and Walter beat A4 at Dead End XVI. At a show in Düsseldorf on 4 March, Walter lost to Matt Riddle. Walter later competed at the 2017 16 Carat Gold tournament, along with the coinciding AMBITION 8 between 10 and 12 March. After beating David Starr and Marius Al-Ani by referee's decision within two days, Walter vengefully defeated Matt Riddle before losing to Ilja Dragunov in the finals of the tournament. At the AMBITION 8 tournament, he lost in the first round to Jeff Cobb.

From 31 March to 6 June 2017, Walter failed to gain the Unified World Wrestling Championship thrice by losing to the incumbent champion, Jurn Simmons. First, on 31 March, he lost to him by pinfall in a singles match in Ludwigshafen, then lost in a four-way match that also involved Axel Dieter Jr. and Mike Bailey on 8 April in Dresden, and finally during another singles match in Erfurt. It was announced in April 2017 that Axel Dieter Jr. would leave wXw to sign with WWE. He failed to win the Shortcut To The Top battle royale on 1 July. At Inner Circle 4 on 5 October 2017, amidst the World Tag Team League weekend, he defeated Thatcher in an "AMBITION rules" match. At the same time, they were partnered up in the league itself. They advanced in their block, defeated The Briscoe Brothers and EYFBO in the process, whilst losing to Homicide and Low Ki, They defeated David Starr and Jurn Simmons in the finals of the tournament, and, in the process, also won the wXw World Tag Team Championships, his third overall reign.

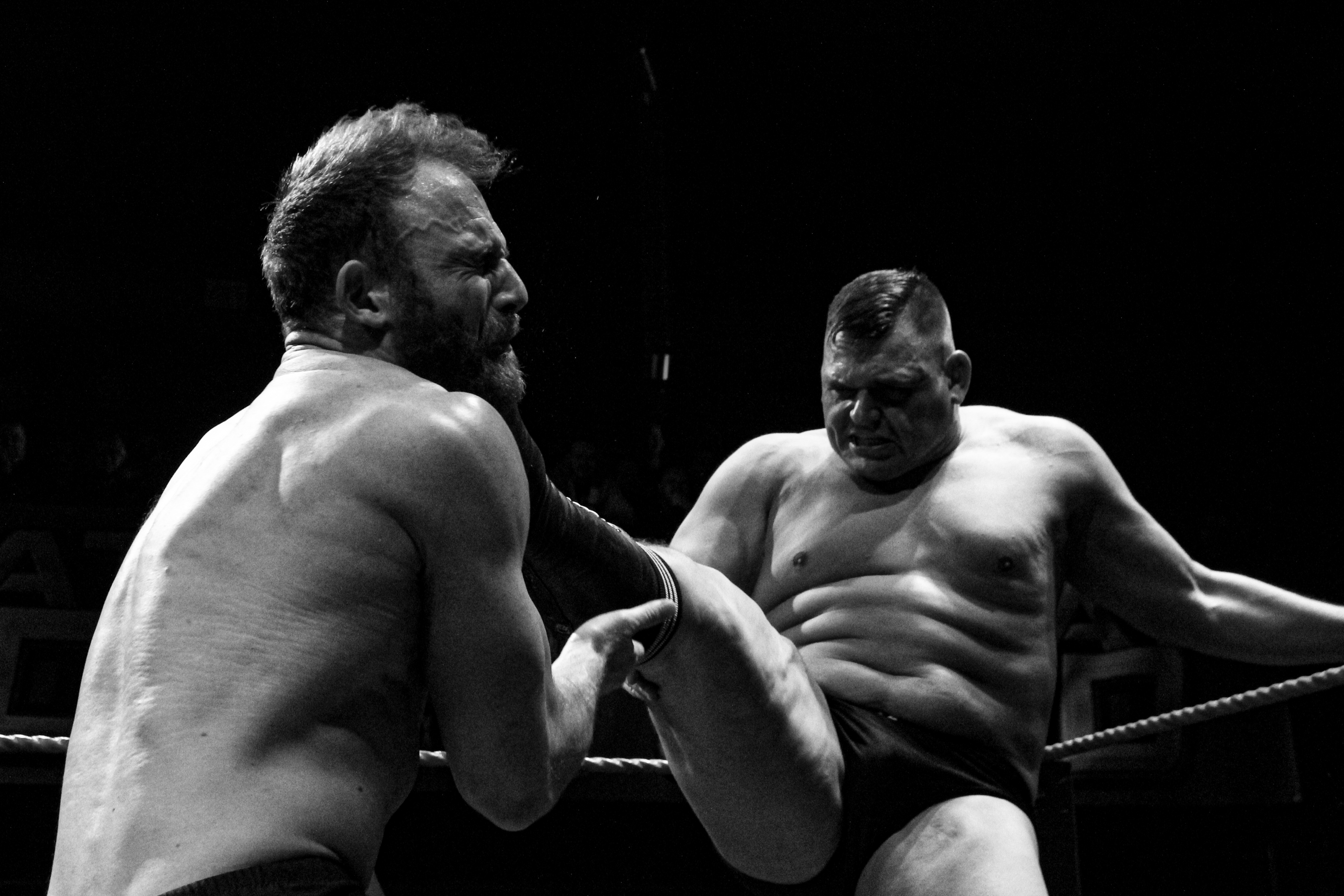
Walter hitting Timothy Thatcher with a big boot during a match on 8 March 2020

On 15 October 2017, in Leipzig, Walter failed to win the Unified World Wrestling Championship again, this time in a no contest in a four-way match against incumbent champion John Klinger (who had become the biggest heel in the company with his faction RISE), Ilja Dragunov and Jurn Simmons. Thatcher and Walter's first defense as World Tag Team Champions came on 3 November, defeating Bobby Gunns and Jaxon Stone. The next day, on 4 November, they successfully defended against RISE members Da Mack and leader John Klinger. They defeated them again, successfully defending the titles, on 17 November, whilst defeating Stone and Gunns again the next day in a tornado-tag elimination match. They defeated Julian Nero and Dreissker on 8 December, with Dreissker now going by the name Avalanche. On 23 December, at wXw's 17 Anniversary, Walter and Thatcher defeated Tarkan Aslan and his brother Lucky Kid in another successful defense.

At the 16 Carat Gold 2018 weekend, Walter was scheduled to compete in a wXw Unified World Wrestling Championship match at the Saturday show against John Klinger. However, Walter announced before the beginning of the match that the stipulation had changed to a three-way and, subsequently, Ilja Dragunov returned to the company to face both Klinger and Walter. Dragunov defeated both to win the championship, after striking Klinger with his Torpedo Moskau maneuver. The next day, Thatcher and Walter lost their tag titles to Klinger and Da Mack.

==== End of wXw run (2018–2021) ====
To have one thing absolutely clear, right from the start: the only reason all of you are sitting here, and the only reason wXw is able to have almost 900 people in attendance, is the hard work myself and Ilja put in! ... No need to applaud; you're part of the problem. When I took one hour of my well-deserved time off for a meet and greet, what did I read then? "WALTER? That's nothing special. He's always been around!". You (the wXw fans) are the most arrogant pile of scum I've ever encountered in my life!

We both realized one thing, and each and everyone of you has to understand this. When I was standing in New York, and had achieved this title, I realized I was destined for bigger things than the shit around here! ... From now on, we are no longer "your wXw guys"; we are superstars! And, from now on, our mission is to eradicate this problem around here: the two of you (Aussie Open), you are showmen; and, we are taking what we deserve. No matter if you like it or anyone else, you can kiss our asses!

— WALTER, wXw Superstars Of Wrestling 2019 (Turbinenhalle, Oberhausen, Germany).

Between 24 March and 5 May, Walter failed to, yet again, win the Unified World Wrestling Championship. Dragunov would defeat Walter, alongside David Starr and Travis Banks, at a show in London on 24 March, and then defeat Walter in 3 straight championship matches on 13 April, 14 April and 5 May in Limbach-Oberfrohna, Dresden and Oberhausen respectively. He failed to win both the Shortcut To The Top battle royale and the World Tag Team Championships in August and September, and failed to win the World Tag Team League in October with Thatcher, despite their two wins in their four-team block. He failed to win the Shotgun Championship against Marius Al-Ani in Hof in October 2018. Walter did, in contrast to his shortcomings, win the AMBITION 11 tournament on 8 August 2019 in Toronto, Ontario, Canada.

During the 2019 16 Carat Gold tournament between 8 and 10 March 2019, Walter lost in the finals to Lucky Kid after he defeated David Starr, Fenix and Avalanche in the previous stages. At Superstars of Wrestling on 1 June, after Walter defeated Wheeler Yuta earlier in the show, Walter and Ilja attacked Aussie Open and "Hardcore" Bob Holly after their match on the show. During the assault, Walter and Ilja attacked the wXw fans and stated that the "hard work [they] put in ... is the only reason wXw is able to have people in attendance". At the Shortcup To The Top 2019 event on 3 August, he and Ilja Dragunov defeated Aussie Open to win the World Tag Team Championships, with Walter now being a four-time tag champion. On 3 August, Walter failed to win the Shortcut To The Top battle royale again, this time losing to Timothy Thatcher. On 9 August in Toronto, Walter defeated Daisuke Sekimoto. On 13 September, Walter and Dragunov lost their titles to Aussie Open; they lost in their rematch clause the next day.

Due to him now being signed with WWE and performing on the NXT UK brand, Walter's schedule became slim for independent bookings. Before the start of the COVID-19 pandemic and its spread in Germany, Walter competed on two wXw shows on 8 March during the 16 Carat Gold weekend, first defeating Shigehiro Irie on a live stream and, later, at the 16 Carat show itself, Thatcher and Walter collaborated with Daisuke Ikeda and Yuki Ishikawa, with Walter and Ikeda losing to Thatcher and Ishikawa in a tag team match. Walter had his final wXw match to date on 18 December 2021, defeating Cara Noir at their 21st Anniversary show.

=== Independent circuit (2011–2020) ===
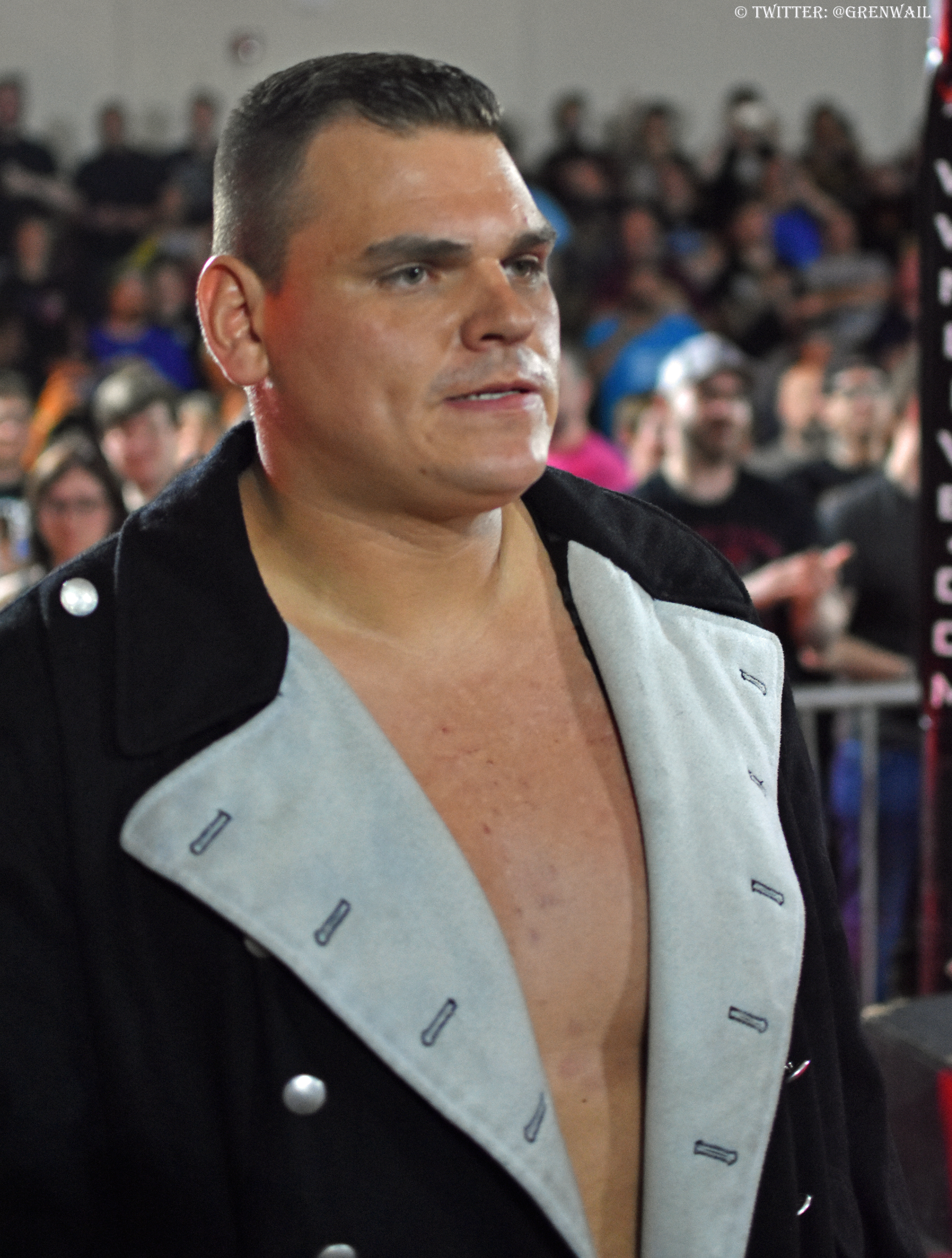
Walter making his entrance at EVOLVE 107 before his match against Adam Cole, 24 June 2018

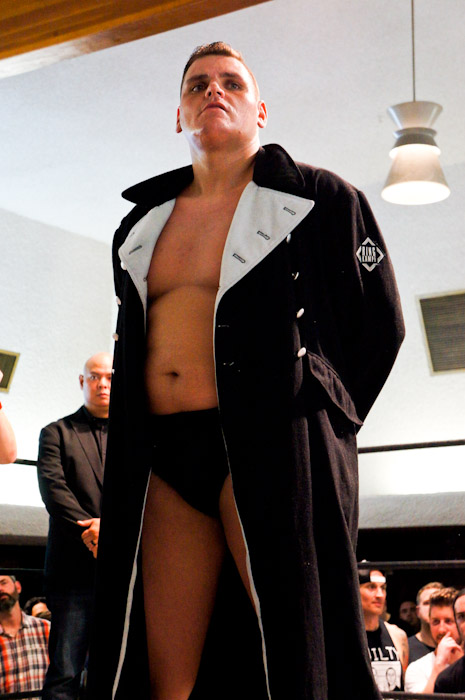
Walter at the 2017 Battle of Los Angeles event in September 2017

Walter made his debut in North America on 13 March 2010 in Philadelphia, Pennsylvania at two events: Combat Zone Wrestling's "Walking On Pins And Needles" event, where he and Karsten Beck lost to the Crimson City Saga (Tommy End and Zack Sabre Jr.).

Walter worked for several independent promotion on the British and Irish independent circuit, like Revolution Pro Wrestling or Progress Wrestling. Walter participated on the Progress Wrestling's tournament Super Strong Style 16 Tournament in 2015 and 2016, but was unable to win the tournament. Perhaps Walter's most known North American work was for Pro Wrestling Guerrilla (PWG). He made his PWG debut during the 2017 Battle of Los Angeles tournament, where he was eliminated by eventual finalist Keith Lee in the opening round. Walter won the PWG World Championship from Keith Lee, and lost it against Jeff Cobb. He became Progress Atlas Champion twice, both times defeating Matt Riddle. After vacating the Atlas Title, he defeated Travis Banks to win the PROGRESS World Title at Chapter 74: Mid Week Matters. He also defeated Trent Seven, the then-Atlas Champion, in a title unification match. He also worked for Over The Top Wrestling in Ireland, winning the OTT World Championship after defeating Jordan Devlin. He lost the title to Devlin in March the next year. Walter also worked for the World Wrestling Network, predominantly its main affiliate EVOLVE, wrestling for the WWN Championship twice.

=== WWE ===
==== United Kingdom Champion (2019–2022) ====
It was reported in November 2018 that Walter had signed an unspecified deal with WWE, and was assigned to the NXT UK brand. Two months later, on 12 January 2019 at NXT UK TakeOver: Blackpool, Walter made his surprise debut by confronting WWE United Kingdom Champion Pete Dunne and attacking defeated challenger Joe Coffey. He defeated Dunne for the WWE United Kingdom Championship three months later at NXT TakeOver: New York. During his time in NXT UK, he joined Fabian Aichner, Dieter Jr. (who had now gone by his real name Marcel Barthel) and Tischer (now under Alexander Wolfe) as Imperium, reuniting Ringkampf under the new name.

On 31 August at NXT UK TakeOver: Cardiff, Walter retained his title against Tyler Bate. Imperium also faced the NXT faction The Undisputed Era (Adam Cole, Roderick Strong, and Bobby Fish and Kyle O'Reilly) at the NXT UK and NXT co-branded event, Worlds Collide. During his reign, the WWE United Kingdom Championship was renamed to NXT United Kingdom Championship. On the 29 October 2020 episode of NXT UK, Walter defeated Ilja Dragunov in a title defense that was highly praised. On 19 February 2021, Walter became the longest-reigning NXT United Kingdom Champion, breaking Pete Dunne's record of 685 days. On 17 March episode of NXT, Walter would return to the NXT brand and attacked Tommaso Ciampa. On 5 April, his championship reign surpassed the two-year mark. Two days later at Stand & Deliver, Walter retained his title against Ciampa. A rematch between Walter and Dragunov was set up for NXT TakeOver 36, where Walter dropped the title to Dragunov, ending his reign at 870 days. His 870-day reign as NXT UK Champion would be the longest championship reign in WWE history since 1988 until Roman Reigns surpassed the record with his second WWE Universal Championship reign in January 2023.

After losing the championship, Walter was transferred to the NXT brand. He would make his in-ring debut on the 18 January 2022 episode of NXT, defeating Roderick Strong, after which his ring name was changed to Gunther. Around this time, he lost around 65 lb (29.5 kg) by changing his diet and workout routine, going from over 300 lb (136 kg) to 250 lb (113 kg). He started a brief feud with LA Knight in March and defeated him at NXT Stand & Deliver in April. On the 5 April episode of NXT, he lost to NXT Champion Bron Breakker in what would be his final NXT appearance.

==== Longest-reigning Intercontinental Champion (2022–2024) ====
Gunther and Barthel (the latter now repackaged as Ludwig Kaiser) made their main roster debut on the 8 April episode of SmackDown and two months later, he defeated Ricochet to win the Intercontinental Championship, making him the first Austrian to win the title. He would successfully defend the title against Ricochet in a rematch and Shinsuke Nakamura. Prior to Gunther's title defense at Clash at the Castle on 3 September against Sheamus, Ludwig Kaiser announced the reformation of Imperium by reintroducing Fabian Aichner, now known as Giovanni Vinci. Gunther subsequently defeated Sheamus to retain the title. Dave Meltzer of the Wrestling Observer Newsletter rated the match five stars, marking Gunther's fifth overall match, his fourth match in WWE, as well as his first match as part of the main roster to receive such a rating. He would beat Sheamus in a rematch on the 7 October episode of SmackDown. Gunther spent the remainder of 2022 and the early months of 2023 retaining the Intercontinental Championship against Rey Mysterio, Ricochet, Braun Strowman, and Madcap Moss in respective singles matches on various SmackDown episodes.

To the surprise of absolutely nobody, the Ringgeneral has rewritten history. I am now officially the longest reigning and greatest Intercontinental Heavyweight Champion in history! ... First, I want to share some words about all of the legends who have held this great title before. You contributed absolutely nothing! I elevated this championship to heights never seen before. And as far as I understand, I'm running a little bit out of competition here; from now on, it seems like I am only competing against myself.

— Gunther, during a celebratory segment on the 11 September 2023 edition of Monday Night Raw for becoming the longest reigning Intercontinental Champion in WWE history (Norfolk, Virginia, USA)

At the Royal Rumble on 28 January, Gunther was the first entrant and the last person eliminated from the titular match; he was eliminated by the match's winner Cody Rhodes, who entered as the thirtieth and final participant. His 71-minute and 25 second performance was the longest in the history of the annually-held event. On Night 2 of WrestleMania 39 on 2 April, Gunther retained the title against Sheamus and Drew McIntyre in a five-star rated triple threat match.

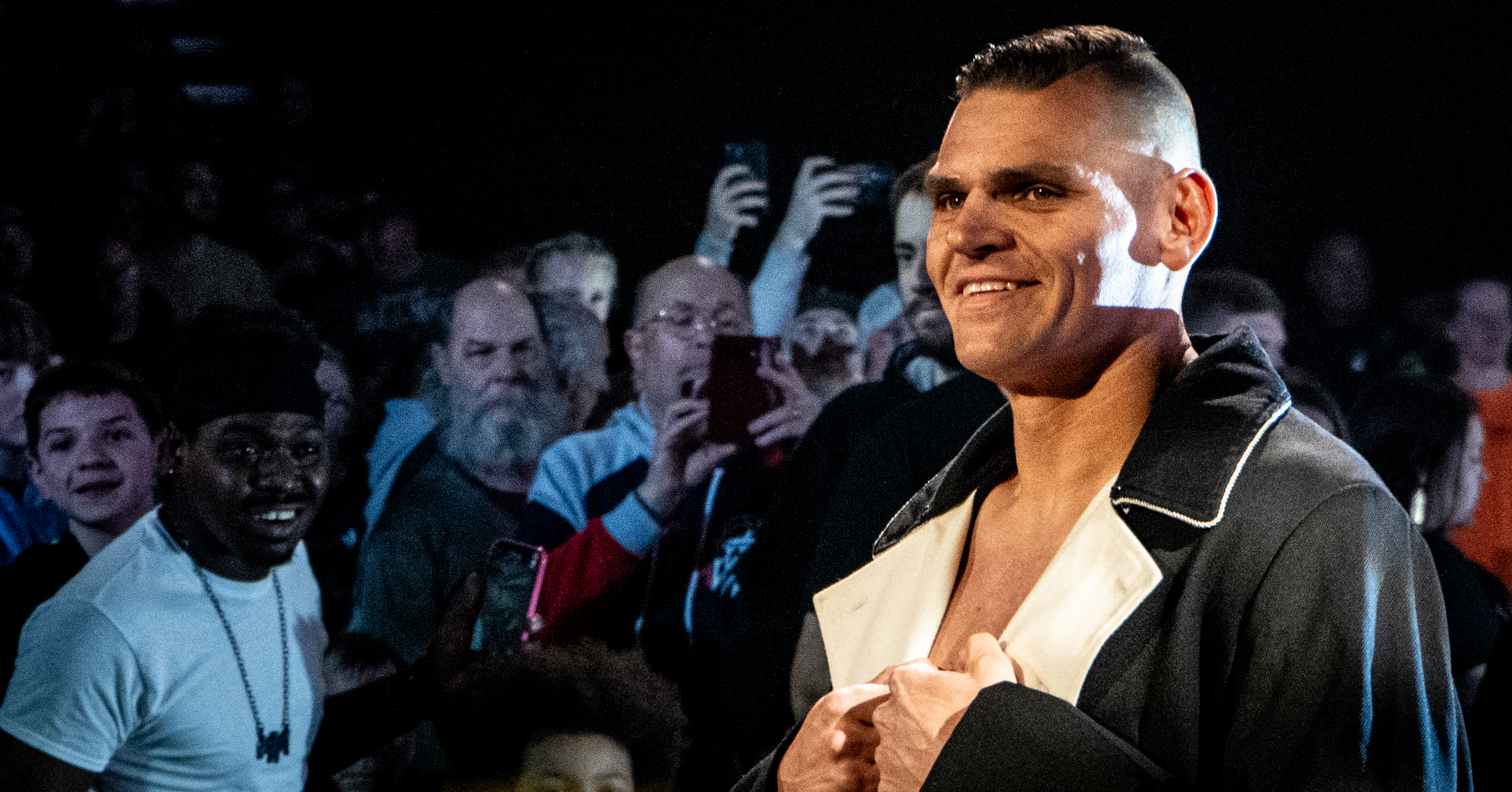
Gunther making his entrance at a "Road to WrestleMania" show in Springfield, Illinois on 23 March 2024

As part of the 2023 WWE Draft, Gunther, along with his Imperium stablemates Ludwig Kaiser and Giovanni Vinci, was drafted to the Raw brand. In the coming months, Gunther successfully defended the Intercontinental Championship against Mustafa Ali at Night of Champions on 27 May, Matt Riddle at Money in the Bank on 1 July, and Drew McIntyre at SummerSlam on 5 August. On 21 August episode of Raw, Gunther defended the title against Chad Gable but lost the match by countout, ending his undefeated singles streak on the main roster; however, as championships do not change hands by countout or disqualification unless otherwise stipulated, Gunther remained champion. After defeating Gable in a rematch on the 4 September episode of Raw, Gunther guaranteed that he would become the longest-reigning Intercontinental Champion later that week, which he did, breaking The Honky Tonk Man's record of 454 days, which he celebrated on 11 September. On 25 November at Survivor Series: WarGames, Gunther successfully defended the Intercontinental Championship against The Miz by submission.

On 20 February, Gunther's Intercontinental Championship reign set another record for the title, this time for most cumulative days as champion, surpassing Pedro Morales' forty one-year record of holding the title for 619 days across two reigns. At Night 1 of WrestleMania XL on 6 April, Gunther was defeated by Sami Zayn for the Intercontinental Championship, ending his record-setting reign at 666 days and making it his first pinfall loss as part of WWE's main roster.

==== World Heavyweight Champion (2024–2025) ====
After WrestleMania XL, Gunther participated into the King of the Ring tournament, he won the tournament after defeating Randy Orton at the King and Queen of the Ring event (albeit in a controversial fashion, as one of Orton's shoulders was not pinned to the mat before the count of three), thus earning a World Heavyweight Championship match at that year's SummerSlam event. At the event on 3 August, Gunther defeated Damian Priest to win the title, thus becoming a world champion in WWE for the first time. In a rematch from King and Queen of the Ring, Gunther would defeat Randy Orton at Bash in Berlin on 31 August in his first title defense, after which he would shake hands with Orton out of respect. On the 7 October episode of Raw, he defeated Sami Zayn in a WrestleMania rematch to retain the title. At Crown Jewel on 2 November, Gunther lost to Cody Rhodes (SmackDown's Undisputed WWE Champion) in a match to determine the inaugural WWE Crown Jewel Champion, after which he would shake hands with Rhodes as a sign of respect.

At Survivor Series WarGames on 30 November, Gunther defeated Priest in a SummerSlam rematch to retain the title after interference from Finn Bálor. On 14 December at Saturday Night's Main Event, he successfully defended the title against both Priest and Bálor in a triple threat match. At Saturday Night's Main Event on 25 January, 2025, Gunther defeated Jey Uso to retain the title; a week after Uso won the Royal Rumble match at the namesake event, Uso picked Gunther to be his championship opponent at WrestleMania 41. On 19 April at Night 1 of WrestleMania 41, Gunther lost the title to Uso via submission, ending his first reign at 259 days.

On the 21 April episode of Raw, Gunther attacked commentators Michael Cole and Pat McAfee. At Backlash on 10 May, Gunther defeated McAfee, after which he gave McAfee a show of respect. On the 9 June episode of Raw, Gunther defeated Uso in a rematch via technical submission to win his second World Heavyweight Championship. On the 16 June episode of Raw, Gunther was confronted by Goldberg, leading to a match on 12 July at Saturday Night's Main Event XL being scheduled. At the event, Gunther defeated Goldberg via technical submission to retain the title in the latter's retirement match. On Night 1 of SummerSlam on 2 August, Gunther lost the title to CM Punk, ending his second reign at 54 days. On 4 August, WWE announced that Gunther would be out indefinitely due to multiple injuries.

==== The Career Killer (2025–present) ====
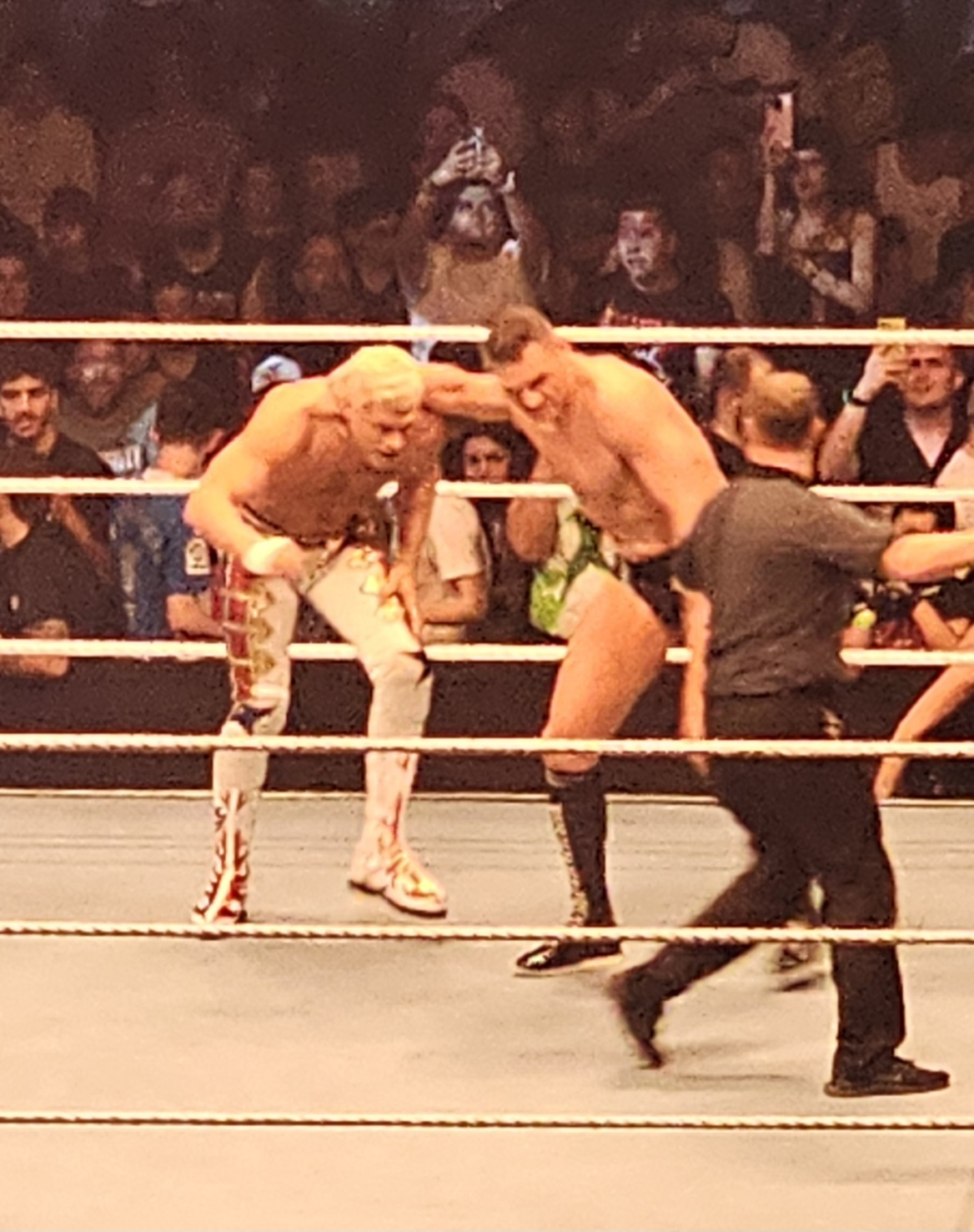
At Clash in Italy, Gunther wrestled Cody Rhodes for the WWE Championship

After a three-month hiatus, Gunther made his return on the 17 November episode of Raw, entering the Last Time Is Now Tournament for the opportunity to become John Cena's final opponent in his retirement match at Saturday Night's Main Event XLII, defeating Je'Von Evans, Carmelo Hayes, Solo Sikoa, and LA Knight over the next few weeks to win the tournament. At the event on 13 December, he defeated Cena via submission, marking Cena's first submission loss in 22 years and fifth overall.

In the wake of his victory over Cena, Gunther began being referred to as a "career killer" after having defeated Goldberg and Cena in their respective retirement matches, and repeatedly gloated about making Cena submit over the next few weeks, leading to a feud with AJ Styles, who took issue with his lack of respect for Cena's legacy. The two wrestled on the 12 January 2026 episode of Raw, where Gunther submitted, but the referee did not see it, allowing Gunther to deliver a low blow and a Powerbomb on Styles to win the match. On the 19 January episode of Raw, he was challenged by Styles to a rematch at Royal Rumble, which Gunther would only agree to if Styles put his career on the line, to which Styles accepted. At the event on 31 January, Gunther defeated Styles, ending his in-ring career, and later entered the Royal Rumble match as the last entrant at #30, eliminating Penta and Randy Orton before being the last competitor eliminated by eventual winner Roman Reigns. At Wrestlemania 42 Night 1 on 18 April, Gunther defeated Seth Rollins by technical submission after interference from a returning Bron Breakker. At Clash in Italy on 31 May, Gunther unsuccessfully faced Cody Rhodes for the Undisputed WWE Championship. The bout ended in controversy after it was shown that Gunther's leg was under the bottom rope during the pinfall, which should have stopped the referee's count. At Night of Champions on 27 June, Gunther once again failed to win the title in a Triple Threat match after it was won by Sami Zayn pinning Rhodes.

In the same month, Gunther began a feud with SmackDown General Manager Nick Aldis after Gunther would accuse him of mistreatement. This escalated to Aldis costing Gunther an Undisputed WWE Championship opportunity at Saturday Night's Main Event XLV on 18 July, and a physical altercation the following day at Fanatics Fest on the SummerSlam Kickoff Show. This would lead to a match between the two at SummerSlam Saturday on 1 August. where Gunther defeated Aldis. The following night at SummerSlam Sunday, Gunther was announced by Aldis as a surprise entrant in fatal four-way match for an Undisputed WWE Championship opportunity, which was won by Kevin Owens, which marks the 2nd time, he wrestled in the same event, after Royal Rumble.

== Professional wrestling style and persona ==
Symphony No. 9 (From the New World)
IV. Allegro con fuoco
Walter/Gunther's most notable entrance theme

He is best known by the gimmick Der Ringgeneral (German for "The Ring General"). The gimmick itself sees him employ a no-frills, hard-hitting style inspired by the likes of Stan Hansen, Big Van Vader, and Kenta Kobashi. He is especially noted for his knife-edge chops, videos of which have sometimes gone viral due to the deafening sound they make and the welts they leave on his opponents' chests.

His philosophy (and the philosophy of Ringkampf (or Imperium, as it was later known as in WWE) members such as Axel Dieter Jr. and Timothy Thatcher) is signified by the motto Die Matte ist Heilig (German for "The Mat is Sacred"), which means that wrestlers must ensure they respect the ring for what it represents to others. He categorically put together three divisions of wrestlers as part of the philosophy: those who are respected fondly for grit, those who are respected out of idiosyncrasy or peasant-like features, and those who disrespect wrestling as a sport (who are often called showmen or slobs).

Since 2025, and previously from 2015 to 2022, his entrance music is the fourth movement of Antonin Dvorak's Symphony No. 9 in E minor, "From the New World". The theme song extended to the members of Ringkampf in wXw (especially Timothy Thatcher, who also used a guitar-based remix of the track), and Imperium in WWE (particularly NXT UK).

== Other media ==
Hahn (as Walter and later Gunther) is a playable character in the video games WWE 2K22, WWE 2K23, WWE 2K24, WWE 2K25, and WWE 2K26.

== Personal life ==
Hahn studied English as a child at school, but was poor at speaking it overall; he picked it up again when he became a professional wrestler and interacted with British, Irish, and American wrestlers in order to improve his speaking skills. He has been fluent in English since around 2012, when wXw expanded its roster to include more wrestlers from English-speaking countries.

From 2015 until 2020, Hahn co-owned the Ringkampf Apparel clothing brand with Marcel Barthel and Axel Tischer, which sponsored wrestlers such as Timothy Moura, Raquel Lourenço, Fabian Aichner, and Jeff Cobb. He is good friends with his fellow Imperium stablemates and wXw referee Rainer Ringer. He was also close friends with deceased wrestlers Karsten Beck, Absolute Andy, and John Klinger. He supports his hometown football team SK Rapid Wien and the Bundesliga team FC Schalke 04.

Hahn met English wrestler Jinny Sandhú when they competed on the independent circuit, and they began dating while in NXT UK. They married in a private ceremony in 2022, and held a second ceremony with in Sandhú's home city of London in April 2023. Their son was born on 27 December 2023. In 2025, they purchased a home in Cambridge.

== Championships and accomplishments ==
- CBS Sports
  - Match of the Year (2020) – vs. Ilja Dragunov on NXT UK
- Defiant Wrestling
  - Defiant Internet Championship (1 time)
- ESPN
  - Match of the Year (2022) – vs. Sheamus at Clash at the Castle
  - Men's Wrestler of the Year (2023, 2024)
- European Wrestling Promotion
  - EWP Tag Team Championship (1 time) – with Michael Kovac
- Fight Club: PRO
  - Infinity Trophy (2018)
- German Stampede Wrestling
  - GSW Tag Team Championship (1 time) – with Robert Dreissker
- Over the Top Wrestling
  - OTT Championship (1 time)
- Progress Wrestling
  - Progress Atlas Championship (3 times)
  - Progress World Championship (1 time)
- Pro Wrestling Fighters
  - PWF North-European Championship (1 time)
- Pro Wrestling Guerrilla
  - PWG World Championship (1 time)
- Pro Wrestling Illustrated
  - Ranked No. 3 of the top 500 singles wrestlers in the PWI 500 in 2025
- Rings of Europe
  - 20 man Halloween Rumble (2006)
  - RoE King of Europe No. 1 Contenders Championship Tournament (2007)
- Sports Illustrated
  - Ranked No. 9 of the top 10 wrestlers of 2023
- TNT Extreme Wrestling
  - TNT World Championship (1 time)
- Westside Xtreme Wrestling
  - wXw Unified World Wrestling Championship (3 times)
  - wXw World Tag Team Championship (4 times) – with Robert Dreissker (1), Zack Sabre Jr (1), Timothy Thatcher (1), and Ilja Dragunov (1)
  - 16 Carat Gold Tournament (2010)
  - wXw World Tag Team Festival/League – with Zack Sabre Jr. (2015) and (2017) – with Timothy Thatcher
  - Ambition 11 Tournament (2019)
- Wrestling Observer Newsletter
  - Europe MVP (2018–2020)
- WWE
  - World Heavyweight Championship (2 times)
  - WWE Intercontinental Championship (1 time)
  - NXT United Kingdom Championship (1 time)
  - King of the Ring (2024)
  - The Last Time Is Now Tournament (2025)
