= Walter Hahn (football manager) =

German football manager

Managerial career
- Years: Team
- 1939–1940: Lithuania

Walter Hahn was a German football manager who managed Lithuania for six matches between 1939 and 1940.

== Career ==
Hahn was the manager of Lithuania between 1939 and 1940. He was in charge of six matches, and finished with a record of three wins, one draw and two losses.

== Managerial statistics ==
Team	From	To	Record								
Team	From	To	M	W	D	L	GF	GA	GD	Win %	Ref.
Lithuania	11 June 1939	13 October 1940	6	3	1	2	8	12	−4	50.00	
