= Murat Bosporus =

German professional and amateur wrestler

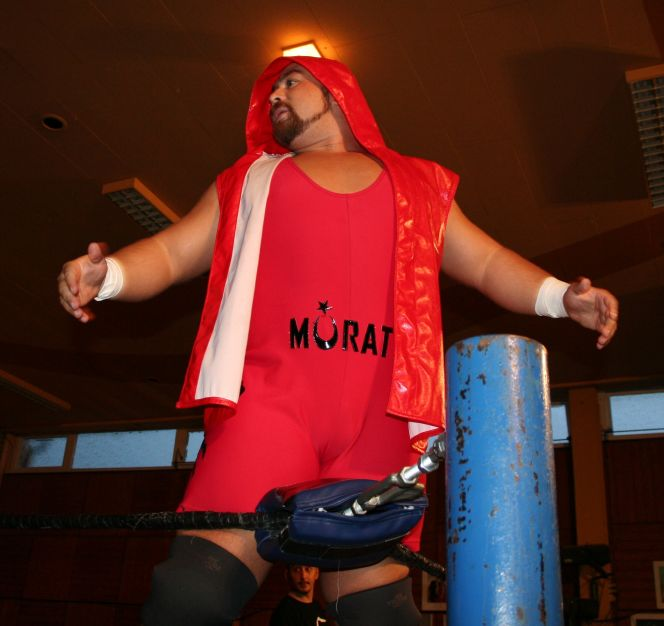
- Bosporus in 2007

Personal information
- Born: Özgür Bakar; December 16, 1979 (age 46) Wolfratshausen, Upper Bavaria, West Germany

Professional wrestling career
- Ring name(s): Murat Bosporus; Murat
- Billed height: 5 ft 6 in (1.68 m)
- Billed weight: 110 kg (240 lb)
- Trained by: Christian Eckstein; Tony St. Clair
- Debut: March 13, 2002
- Retired: October 13, 2018

Özgür Bakar (born 16 December 1979), better known by his ring name Murat Bosporus, is a German-Turkish professional wrestler. He is best known for his work on the German independent circuit.

== Career ==
Bakar was an amateur before he started a career as a professional wrestler. His debut match took place in March 2002 with the local European Wrestling Promotion. Since then he has become one of the top German wrestlers working for over 30 promotion worldwide in countries such as France, Italy, Spain, England, Switzerland, Denmark, Netherlands, Austria, among others.

In 2006 he became the first German to work for the Japanese Pro Wrestling NOAH, where he made numerous acclaimed matches. Meanwhile, he also had a tryout match with WWE and TNA while both promotions visited Germany for live events.

In 2008 he was a regular in the major African promotion World Wrestling Professionals based in South Africa working alongside Joe E. Legend who later that year invited him to tour Canada with BSE Pro.

As of 2011 he works regularly for German Stampede Wrestling and Turkish Power Wrestling.

In 2011 he teamed with his fellow TPW competitor Big Boy and Dave Finlay in Japanese promotion Smash pro wrestling. They had competed against Tajiri, Ohara and Fujiwara. Team Tajiri won the match by pinning Big Boy.

In Turkish Power Wrestling he defended his title against Joe E. Legend, Low Ki, Tom La Ruffa, Yoshihiro Tajiri and Doug Williams.

== Championships and accomplishments ==
- Championship Of Wrestling
  - cOw Interstate Championship (1 time)
- German Hurricane Wrestling
  - GHW Heavyweight Championship (2 times)
- German Stampede Wrestling
  - GSW Breakthrough Championship (1 time)
- German Wrestling Promotion
  - Dragonhearts Championship (1 time)
- New Blood Wrestling
  - NBW Dutch Masters Tournament (2005)
- Power of Wrestling
  - POW Intercontinental Championship (1 time)
  - POW Tag Team Championship (2 times) – with Hakem Wakuur (1) and James Mason (1)
- Pro Wrestling Illustrated
  - PWI ranked him #180 of the top 500 singles wrestlers in the PWI 500 in 2013
- Turkish Power Wrestling
  - TPW Intercontinental Championship (1 time)
- Westside Xtreme Wrestling
  - wXw Tag Team Championship (2 times) – with Wesley Croton
- Wrestling School Austria
  - WSA European Championship (1 time)
