= WXw Unified World Wrestling Championship =

Professional wrestling championship

wXw Unified World Wrestling Championship
- Official design of the title

Details
- Promotion: Westside Xtreme Wrestling
- Date established: July 1, 2001
- Current champion: Ahura
- Date won: August 15, 2026

Other names
- wXw Heavyweight Championship (July 1, 2001 – June 21, 2003); wXw World Heavyweight Championship (June 21, 2003 – June 5, 2010); wXw Unified World Wrestling Championship (June 5, 2010 – present)
Statistics
- First champion: Mad Cow
- Most reigns: Big van Walter, John Klinger and Jurn Simmons (3 reigns)
- Longest reign: Ares (604 days)
- Shortest reign: Alex Shelley, Jimmy Jacobs and Marty Scurll (<1 day)
- Oldest champion: Robbie Brookside (38 years, 275 days)
- Heaviest champion: Big Daddy Walter/Big Van Walter (310 lb)

The wXw Unified World Wrestling Championship is a professional wrestling world heavyweight championship, contested in the German professional wrestling promotion, Westside Xtreme Wrestling. The championship was established in 2001 as the wXw World Heavyweight Championship, but was later unified with the wXw World Lightweight Championship to create the modern title.

== Title history ==
There have been a total of 58 reigns shared between 41 different champions. Mad Cow was the inaugural champion. Big van Walter, John Klinger and Jurn Simmons shares the record for most reign with three. Ares's second reign is the longest at 603 days, while Alex Shelley, Jimmy Jacobs and Marty Scurll reign is the shortest at less than hour. The current champion is Ahura who is in his first reign.

At wXw 23rd Anniversary on December 23, 2023, Robert Dreissker defeated Masha Slamovich to unify the title with the wXw Women's Championship.

Key
No.	Overall reign number
Reign	Reign number for the specific champion
Days	Number of days held
<1	Reign lasted less than a day
+	Current reign is changing daily

No.	Champion	Championship change			Reign statistics		Notes	Ref.
No.	Champion	Date	Event	Location	Reign	Days	Notes	Ref.
1	Mad Cow	July 1, 2001	Dead End	Essen, Germany	1	56	Defeated Chris the Bambikiller to become the inaugural champion	
2	Eric Schwarz	August 26, 2001	Broken Rulz	Essen, Germany	1	112	Defeated The Bull, substituting an injured Mad Cow	
—	Vacated	December 15, 2001	—	—	—	—	Vacated due to injury	
3	Thomas Blade	December 16, 2001	Live Event	Dresden, Germany	1	49	Defeated Big Sick Ben for the vacated title	
4	Chris the Bambikiller	February 3, 2002	wXw Payback	Nuremberg, Germany	1	159		
—	Vacated	July 12, 2002	—	—	—	—		
5	Martin Nolte	August 17, 2002	True Colors	Essen, Germany	1	196	Won a 20-man Battle Royal for the vacated title	
6	Chris Hero	March 1, 2003	Back To The Roots 2	Essen, Germany	1	252	Due to the title being defended in the USA against IWA Mid-South Heavyweight Champion Mark Wolf on June 21, 2003, it gained "World" status and was renamed to wXw World Heavyweight Championship	
7	Alex Shelley	November 8, 2003	IWA Mid-South Ted Petty Invitational 2003 - Day 2	Salem, IN	1	41	This was a tournament final three-way match, also involving IWA Mid-South Heavyweight Champion Danny Daniels	
8	Jimmy Jacobs	December 19, 2003	IWA Mid-South Winter Wars 2003	Lafayette, IN	1	<1	This was a Submission Match and the third in a Best Of Seven Series	
9	Alex Shelley	December 19, 2003	IWA Mid-South Winter Wars 2003	Lafayette, IN	2	<1	This was a Lumberjack Match and the fourth in a Best of Seven Series	
10	Jimmy Jacobs	December 19, 2003	IWA Mid-South Winter Wars 2003	Lafayette, IN	2	8	This was a Texas Death Match and the fifth in a Best of Seven Series	
11	Double C	December 27, 2003	3rd Anniversary HUSS-Mas	Essen, Germany	1	168		
12	Ian Rotten	June 12, 2004	Dead End 4	Essen, Germany	1	7		
13	Double C	June 19, 2004	Live Event	Vienna, Austria	2	175	This was also the Round Robin Tournament Match.	
14	Robbie Brookside	December 11, 2004	4th Anniversary Show	Essen, Germany	1	295		
15	Ares	October 2, 2005	Sunday Bloody Sunday II	Essen, Germany	1	167		
16	Mike Quackenbush	March 18, 2006	Back To The Roots 5 - Enter The Dark Side	Essen, Germany	1	13		
17	Ares	March 31, 2006	CHIKARA Naked	Reading, PA	2	603		
18	Alex Pain	November 24, 2007	7th Anniversary Show - Strong Style Tournament	Oberhausen, Germany	1	105		
19	Steve Douglas	March 8, 2008	16 Carat Gold 2008 - Day 2	Essen, Germany	1	246		
—	Vacated	November 9, 2008	—	—	—	—		
20	John Klinger	December 13, 2008	8th Anniversary Show	Oberhausen, Germany	1	84		
21	Bryan Danielson	March 7, 2009	16 Carat Gold 2009 - Day 2	Oberhausen, Germany	1	55		
22	Absolute Andy	May 1, 2009	Dead End IX Beta	Oberhausen, Germany	1	225		
23	Steve Douglas	December 12, 2009	9th Anniversary Show	Oberhausen, Germany	2	175		
24	Zack Sabre Jr.	June 5, 2010	Dead End X	Oberhausen, Germany	1	119	Sabre Jr. defeated Douglas to unify the wXw World Heavyweight Championship into his wXw World Lightweight Championship. The title became known as the wXw Unified World Wrestling Championship	
25	Big Daddy Walter	October 2, 2010	HATEs Fuckin' Birthday Show	Oberhausen, Germany	1	105		
26	Daisuke Sekimoto	January 15, 2011	Back To The Roots X	Oberhausen, Germany	1	107		
27	Big Van Walter	May 2, 2011	BJW Live Event	Tokyo, Japan	2	383	Walter was originally known as Big Daddy Walter.	
28	El Generico	May 19, 2012	Dead End XII	Oberhausen, Germany	1	85		
29	Axel Tischer	August 12, 2012	Fans Appreciation Weekend 2012 - Day 2	Oberhausen, Germany	1	293	This was a four-way match, also involving John Klinger and Karsten Beck.	
30	Tommy End	June 1, 2013	Dead End XIII	Oberhausen, Germany	1	421		
31	Big Daddy Walter	July 27, 2014	Fans Appreciation Night 2014	Oberhausen, Germany	3	174		
32	Karsten Beck	January 17, 2015	Back To The Roots XIV	Oberhausen, Germany	1	223		
33	John Klinger	August 28, 2015	Fans Appreciation Night 2015: Hamburg	Hamburg, Germany	2	1		
34	Karsten Beck	August 29, 2015	Fans Appreciation Night 2015: Oberhausen	Oberhausen, Germany	2	196	This was a three-way match also involving A.J. Styles.	
35	Jurn Simmons	March 12, 2016	16 Carat Gold 2016 - Day 2	Oberhausen, Germany	1	273	This was a four-way match, also involving Absolute Andy and John Klinger.	
36	Marty Scurll	December 10, 2016	16th Anniversary	Oberhausen, Germany	1	<1	This was a three-way match also involving Adam Cole.	
37	Axel Dieter Jr.	December 10, 2016	16th Anniversary	Oberhausen, Germany	1	91		
38	Jurn Simmons	March 11, 2017	16 Carat Gold 2017 - Day 2	Oberhausen, Germany	2	147		
39	John Klinger	August 5, 2017	Fight Forever Tour Opening	Oberhausen, Germany	3	217	This was a three-way match also involving Ilja Dragunov.	
40	Ilja Dragunov	March 10, 2018	16 Carat Gold 2018 - Day 2	Oberhausen, Germany	1	147	This was a three-way match also involving Walter.	
41	Absolute Andy	August 4, 2018	Shortcut To The Top 2018	Oberhausen, Germany	2	217		
42	Bobby Gunns	March 9, 2019	16 Carat Gold 2019 - Day 2	Oberhausen, Germany	1	210		
43	Timothy Thatcher	October 5, 2019	World Tag Team Festival - Night 2	Oberhausen, Germany	1	70		
44	Bobby Gunns	December 14, 2019	19th Anniversary	Oberhausen, Germany	2	482	This was a four-way match also involving David Starr and Ilja Dragunov.	
45	Marius Al-Ani	April 9, 2021	Dead End	Oberhausen, Germany	1	197		
46	Axel Tischer	October 23, 2021	True Colors	Dresden, Germany	2	133		
47	Tristan Archer	March 5, 2022	16 Carat Gold 2020	Oberhausen, Germany	1	28	This was a four-way match, also involving Jurn Simmons and Levaniel.	
48	Jurn Simmons	April 2, 2022	We Love Wrestling - 16 Carat Gold Revenge	Frankfurt, Germany	3	28	This was a three-way match, also involving Axel Tischer.	
49	Tristan Archer	April 30, 2022	We Love Wrestling - SLAM In Den Mai	Weyhe, Germany	2	231		
50	Levaniel	December 17, 2022	22nd Anniversary	Weyhe, Germany	1	56		
—	Vacated	February 11, 2023	—	—	—	—	Vacated due to Levaniel failing to qualify for the wXw 16 Carat Gold Tournament, where he was scheduled to defend his title.	
51	Shigehiro Irie	March 12, 2023	wXw 16 Carat Gold - Day 3	Oberhausen, Germany	1	97	Defeated Axel Tischer for the vacant title.	
52	Robert Dreissker	June 17, 2023	wXw Drive Of Champions 2023	Oberhausen, Germany	1	350	At wXw 23rd Anniversary on December 23, 2023, Dreissker defeated Masha Slamovich to unify the title with the wXw Women's Championship.	
53	Laurance Roman	June 1, 2024	wXw Drive Of Champions 2024	Oberhausen, Germany	1	126	This was a lumberjack match.	
54	Peter Tihanyi	October 5, 2024	wXw World Tag Team Festival 2024 - Night 2	Oberhausen, Germany	1	131	This was a three-way match also involving Robert Dreissker.	
—	Vacated	February 13, 2025	—	—	—	—	Vacated due to Peter Tihanyi sustaining a shoulder injury.	
55	1 Called Manders	April 5, 2025	wXw We Love Wrestling: 16 Carat Gold Revenge	Frankfurt, Hessen	1	175	He defeated Elijah Blum to win the vacant title.	
56	Peter Tihanyi	September 27, 2025	wXw Catch Grand Prix 2025 - Night 3	Oberhausen, Germany	2	119		
57	Elijah Blum	January 24, 2026	wXw Back To The Roots 2026	Oberhausen, Germany	1	203	This was a pure wrestling rules match.	
58	Ahura	August 15, 2026	wXw Shortcut To The Top 2026	Oberhausen, Germany	1	71+		

== Combined reigns ==
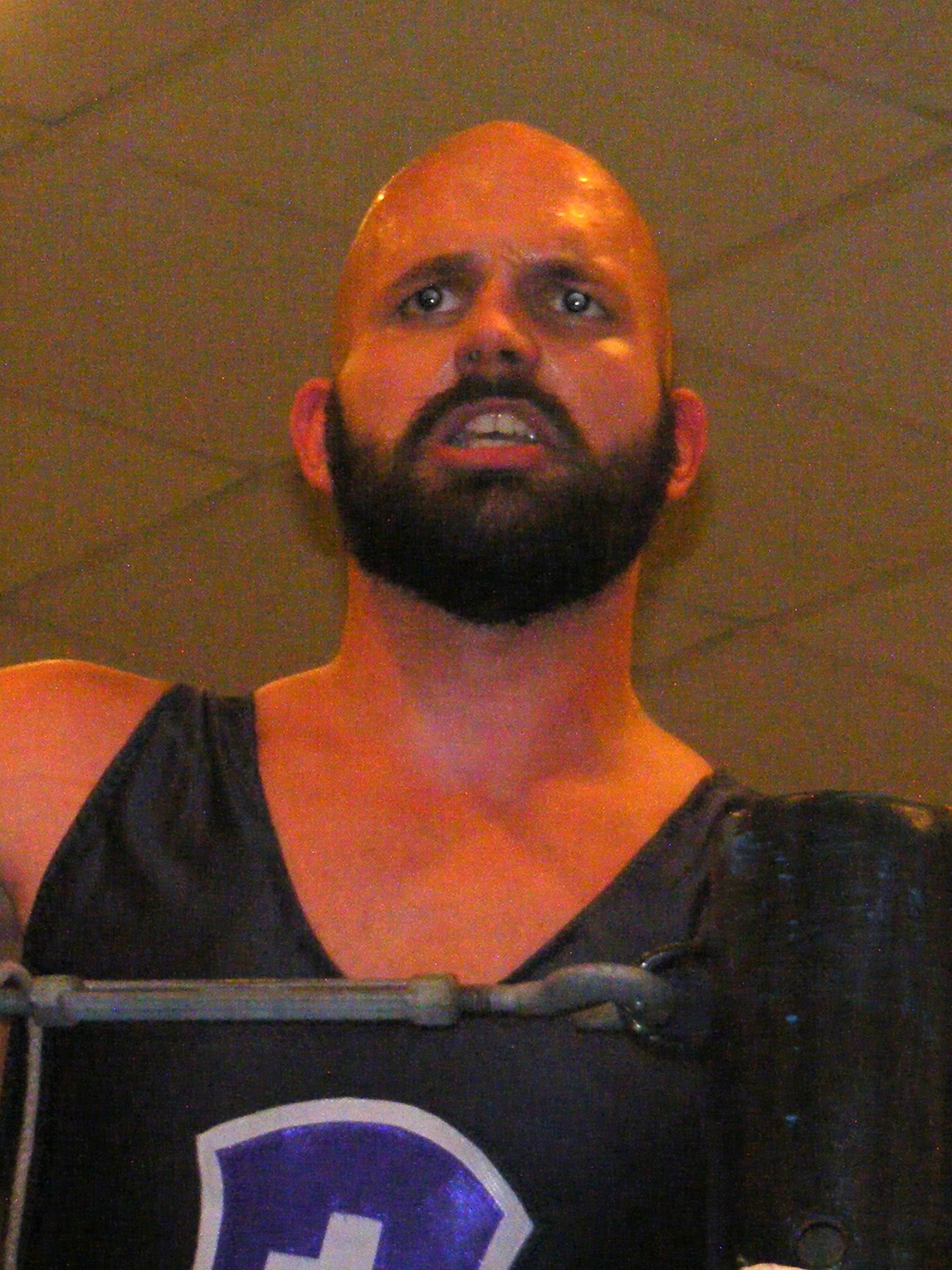
Ares, records longest combined reigns at 770 days and longest single reign at 603 days

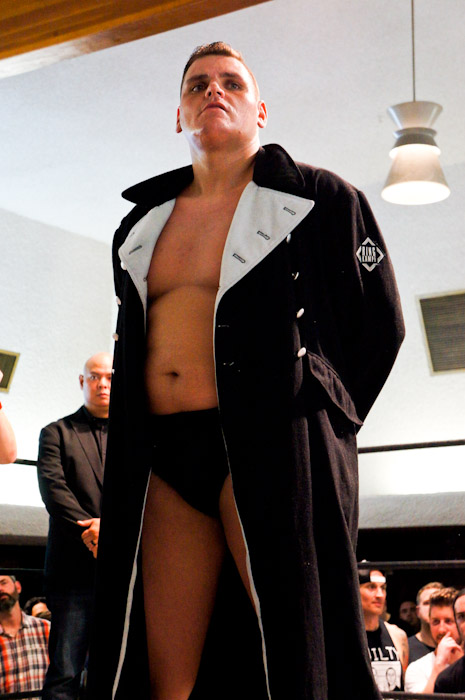
Walter, record-tied three-time champion, under the ring names Big Van Walter and Big Daddy Walter

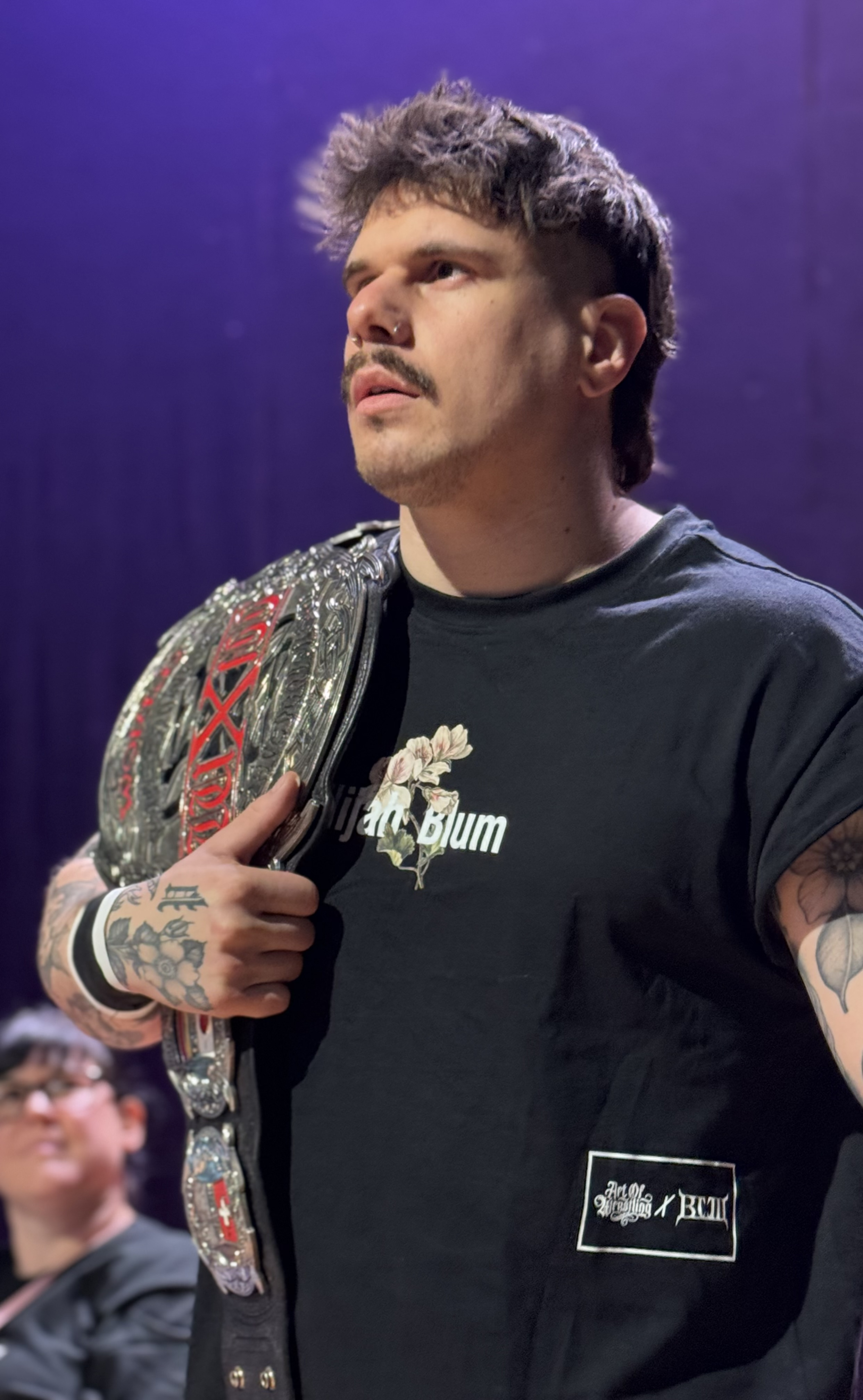
Former one-time champion, Elijah Blum, shown here with the current design of the title.

As of October 25, 2026.

†	Indicates the current champion

Rank	Wrestler	No. of reigns	Combined days
1	Ares	2	770
2	Bobby Gunns	2	693
3	Big Van Walter/Big Daddy Walter	3	662
4	Jurn Simmons	3	448
5	Absolute Andy	2	442
6	Axel "Axeman" Tischer	2	426
7	Steve Douglas	2	421
7	Tommy End	1	421
9	Karsten Beck	2	419
10	Robert Dreissker	1	350
11	Double C	2	343
12	John Klinger	3	302
13	Robbie Brookside	1	295
14	Tristan Archer	2	259
15	Chris Hero	1	252
16	Peter Tihanyi	2	250
17	Elijah Blum	1	203
18	Marius Al-Ani	1	197
19	Martin Nolte	1	196
20	1 Called Manders	1	175
21	Chris the Bambikiller	1	159
22	Ilja Dragunov	1	147
23	Laurance Roman	1	126
24	Zack Sabre Jr.	1	119
25	Eric Schwarz	1	112
26	Daisuke Sekimoto	1	107
27	Alex Pain	1	105
28	Shigehiro Irie	1	97
29	Axel Dieter Jr.	1	91
30	El Generico	1	85
31	Ahura †	1	71+
32	Timothy Thatcher	1	70
33	Mad Cow	1	56
33	Levaniel	1	56
35	Bryan Danielson	1	55
36	Thomas Blade	1	49
37	Alex Shelley	2	41
38	Mike Quackenbush	1	13
39	Jimmy Jacobs	2	8
40	Ian Rotten	1	7
41	Marty Scurll	1	<1

== See also ==
- wXw World Tag Team Championship
- wXw Shotgun Championship
