= Bad Bones =

German professional wrestler (1984–2024)

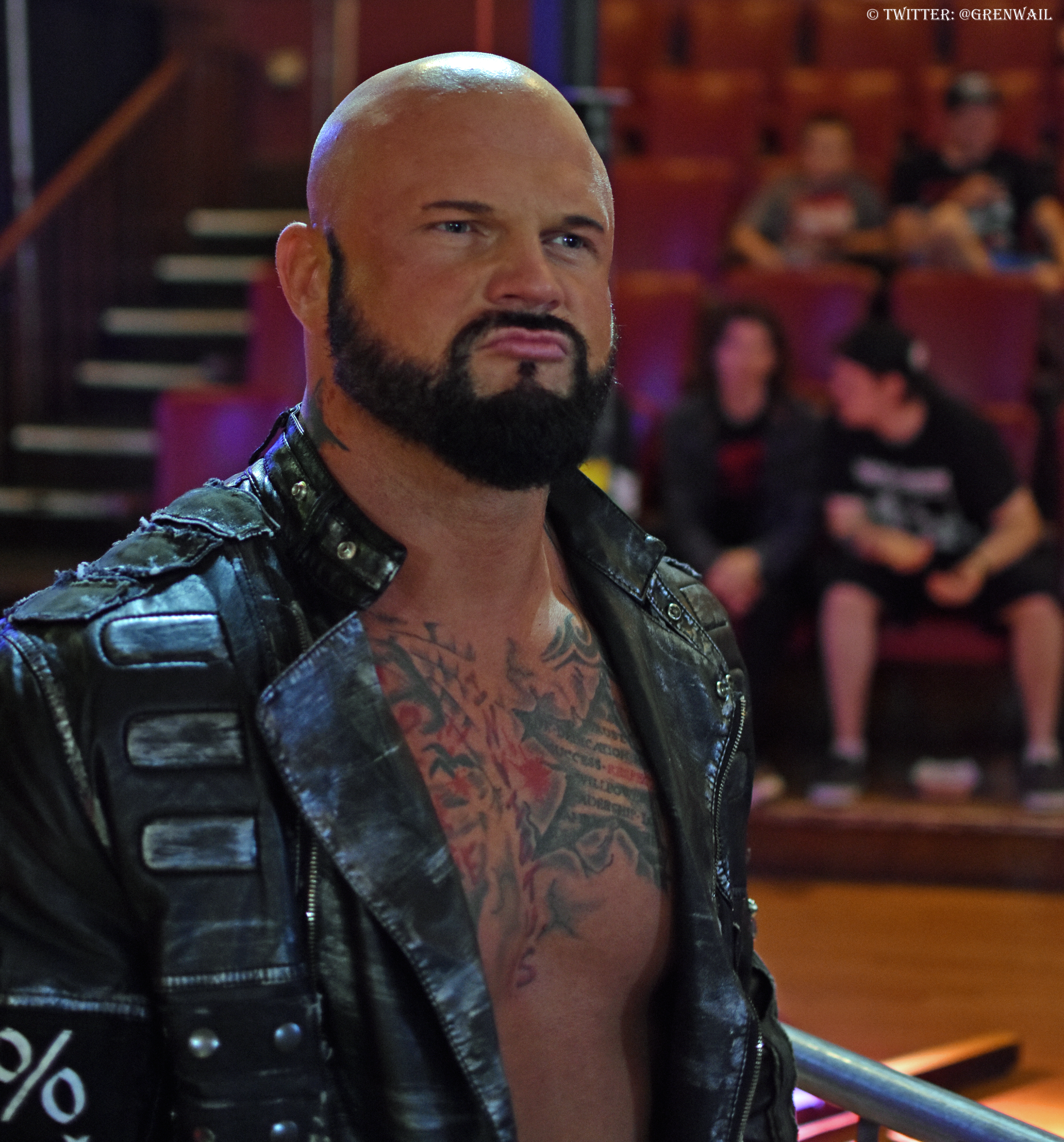
- Klinger in 2018

Personal information
- Born: John Klinger; 14 May 1984 Bitburg, Rhineland-Palatinate, West Germany
- Died: 20 May 2024 (aged 40) Bremen, Germany

Professional wrestling career
- Ring names: Bad Bones; Bad News Bones; John Kay; John Klinger
- Billed height: 5 ft 11 in (180 cm)
- Billed weight: 229 lb (104 kg)
- Trained by: Karsten Kretschmer; Lloyd Anoa'i; ROH Wrestling Academy; Takao Omori; Tommy Suede
- Debut: 2004

John Klinger (14 May 1984 – 20 May 2024) was a German professional wrestler better known by the ring name Bad Bones. Klinger worked internationally as part of independent promotions across Europe, Japan, Israel, and the United States.

== Professional wrestling career ==
=== Independent circuit (2004–2024) ===
Bad Bones debuted in 2004. He held numerous titles including the wXw Unified World Heavyweight Championship and European Heavyweight Championship. Wrestling internationally he faced Frankie Sloan for All Star Wrestling, Spud for 1 Pro Wrestling, Andy Wild for Discovery Wrestling and the BCW Openweight Championship, Mikey Whiplash and Johnny Moss for Insane Championship Wrestling, Rampage Brown for PROGRESS Wrestling, Josh Briggs for EVOLVE Wrestling, and numerous others.

=== Total Nonstop Action Wrestling (2011, 2014, 2017) ===
Bad Bones first appeared in TNA during the 29 September TNA First Impact Tour where he defeated Karsten Kretschmer. He participated in and won the January 2011 edition of TNA Gut Check held in London, England.

Bad Bones returned to TNA in February 2014, during this time, Bad Bones worked in several matches for TNA. On 1 February, Bones faced Christopher Daniels in a dark match, losing to Daniels. On that same night, during the regular broadcast of Impact Wrestling, he lost to Samoa Joe. The following night on 2 February, at TNA One Night Only: Joker's Wild 2, Bones teamed with Samoa Joe, to defeat Christopher Daniels and Robbie E in a qualifying match for the Joker's Wild Gauntlet match. The $100,000 Joker's Wild Gauntlet was later won by Ethan Carter III. During the 27 February edition of Impact Wrestling, Bones was selected by Magnus to be the opponent of Magnus' rival Samoa Joe. He was defeated by Joe in the brief match that followed.

On 24 February 2017, edition of Impact Wrestling, Bad Bones returned to TNA in a losing effort against the debuting Josh Barnett.

== Death ==
Klinger died on 20 May 2024, at the age of 40.

== Championships and accomplishments ==
- Eastside Revolution Wrestling
  - ERW Championship (1 time)
- Art of Wrestling
  - AOW Championship (1 time)
- Athletik Club Wrestling
  - ACW German Championship (1 time)
  - ACW World Wrestling Championship (2 times)
  - Deutsche Meisterschaft Championship (1 time)
- Defiant Wrestling
  - Ringmaster Tournament (2018)
- Deutsche Wrestling Allianz
  - DWA European Championship (1 time)
- East Side Wrestling
  - ESW Europameisterschaft Championship (1 time)
- European Wrestling Promotion
  - Spree Cup (2019)
- Fighting Spirit Federation
  - FSF Tag Team Championship (1 time) – with Steve Douglas
- Fiend Wrestling Germany
  - FWG Championship (1 time)
- German Hurricane Wrestling
  - GHW Heavyweight Championship (1 time)
  - GHW Tag Team Championship (2 times) – with Carnage
  - GHW Heavyweight Championship Tournament (2009)
  - GHW Tag Team Championship Tournament (2013) - with Carnage
- German Stampede Wrestling
  - GSW World Heavyweight Championship (1 time)
  - GSW Tag Team Championship (1 time) – with Steve Allison
- German Wrestling Federation
  - GWF Middleweight Championship (1 time)
  - GWF World Championship (1 time)
  - GWF Tag Team Championship (3 time) with Tarkan Aslan (2) And Erkan Sulcani (1)
- German Wrestling Promotion
  - GWP World Championship (1 time)
  - WrestlingCorner.de Championship (1 time)
- International Catch Wrestling Alliance
  - ICWA European Championship (1 time)
  - ICWA Tournament (2007)
- International Pro Wrestling: United Kingdom
  - IPW:UK World Championship (2 times)
- National Wrestling Alliance
  - NWA European Heavyweight Championship (1 time)
- Power Of Wrestling
  - POW Intercontinental Championship (1 time)
- Pro Wrestling Illustrated
  - Ranked No. 279 of the top 500 singles wrestlers in the PWI 500 in 2019
- Swiss Wrestling Entertainment
  - SWE Championship (1 time, final)
  - SWE King of Switzerland Championship (1 time)
  - European Heavyweight Championship (1 time)
- Unlimited Wrestling
  - Unlimited Championship (2 times)
- Westside Xtreme Wrestling
  - wXw Unified World Wrestling Championship (3 times)
  - wXw World Tag Team Championship (2 times) – with Carnage (1) and Da Mack (1)
  - wXw Shotgun Championship (2 times)
  - Strong Style Tournament (2007)
  - wXw World Heavyweight Championship Tournament (2008)
  - 16 Carat Gold Tournament (2008)
  - Shortcut to the Top Battle Royal (2013, 2017)
  - Catch Roulette Tournament (2014)
  - Mitteldeutschland Cup (2016)
- WrestlingKULT
  - WrestlingKULT Championship (1 time)
