= Laurance Roman =

German professional wrestler

Personal information
- Born: May 11, 1996 (age 30) Dresden, Germany

Professional wrestling career
- Ring name(s): Kid Gass; Laurance Roman; Laurance Star; Lawrence Kidd
- Billed height: 170 cm (5 ft 7 in)
- Billed weight: 86 kg (190 lb)
- Trained by: Axel Tischer
- Debut: 2013

Laurance Roman is a German professional wrestler, He is signed to Westside Xtreme Wrestling (wXw), where he is the current wXw European Champion in his first reign. He also a former three-time wXw World Tag Team Champion, a former one-time wXw Shotgun Champion and former one-time wXw Unified World Wrestling Champion. He also makes appearances on the European independent scene.

== Professional wrestling career ==
=== Independent circuit (2013–present) ===
Roman made his professional wrestling debut at GWF/Next Step III, a cross-over event produced by Next Step Wrestling and German Wrestling Federation on July 6, 2013, where he competed in a 12-man battle royal won by Robert Kaiser. At PROGRESS Chapter 156: Steal Yourself on September 10, 2023, Roman successfully defended the wXw Shotgun Championship against Gene Munny. At GCW Vs. The World, an event promoted by Game Changer Wrestling on September 23, 2023, he teamed up with Amboss stablemates Icarus and Robert Dreissker to defeat SGCunt (1 Called Manders, Dark Sheik and Mance Warner) in a six-person tag team match.

=== Westside Xtreme Wrestling (2014–present) ===
Roman is best known for his tenure with the German professional wrestling promotion Westside Xtreme Wrestling. He made his debut at wXw 14th Anniversary Tour: Prag on October 11, 2014, where he fell short to Toby Blunt in singles competition.

Roman began chasing for multiple championships promoted by the company. He won his first title, the wXw Shotgun Championship by defeating Maggot at wXw Back To The Roots 2023 on January 28. At a house show from September 23, 2023, Roman teamed up with Amboss stablemate Robert Dreissker and defeated Only Friends (Bobby Gunns and Michael Knight) to win the wXw World Tag Team Championship. He would win the tag team titles on one more occasion with one of his other stablemates Icarus at wXw Broken Rules XXI on November 11, 2023, by defeating Dennis Dullnig and Hektor Invictus.

Roman competed in various of the promotion's signature events. One of them is the Shortcut To The Top in which he made his first appearance at the 2018 edition where he competed in the traditional battle royal disputed for the number one contendership for the wXw Unified World Wrestling Championship won by Bobby Gunns and also involving various opponents such as Alpha Female, David Starr, Emil Sitoci, Doug Williams, Jay Skillet, Oliver Carter, The Rotation, Timothy Thatcher, Michael Dante and Walter. At wXw Shortcut To The Top 2022 on August 6, he competed again in the traditional battle royal won by Levaniel, bout which also included various other notable opponents such as Axel Tischer, Jurn Simmons, Norman Harras, Robert Dreissker, Senza Volto, Aigle Blanc and Teoman.

He competed in one of the promotion's signature events, the 16 Carat Gold Tournament, making his first presence in the 2023 edition of the competition, where he fell short to Francesco Akira in the first rounds.

== Championships and accomplishments ==
- Art Of Wrestling
  - AOW Championship (1 time, current)
- Catch Factory
  - Catch Factory Dog Fight Championship (1 time)
- Hungarian Championship Wrestling
  - HCW Tag Team Championship (1 time) – with Robert Dreissker, Dover and Icarus
- Next Step Wrestling
  - Next Step Heavyweight Championship (1 time)
  - Next Step National Championship (1 time)
  - Next Step National Title Tournament (2017)
- German Wrestling Federation
  - GWF Mixed Tag Team Championship (1 time) – with Stephanie Maze
- Pro Wrestling Illustrated
  - Ranked No. 113 of the top 500 singles wrestlers in the PWI 500 in 2024
- Westside Xtreme Wrestling
  - wXw Unified World Wrestling Championship (1 time)
  - wXw Shotgun Championship (1 time)
  - wXw European Championship (1 time, current)
  - wXw World Tag Team Championship (3 times) – with Robert Dreissker (1), Icarus (1) and Nick Schreier (1)
  - 16 Carat Gold Tournament (2024)
  - Third wXw Triple Crown Champion
