= Norman Harras =

German professional wrestler

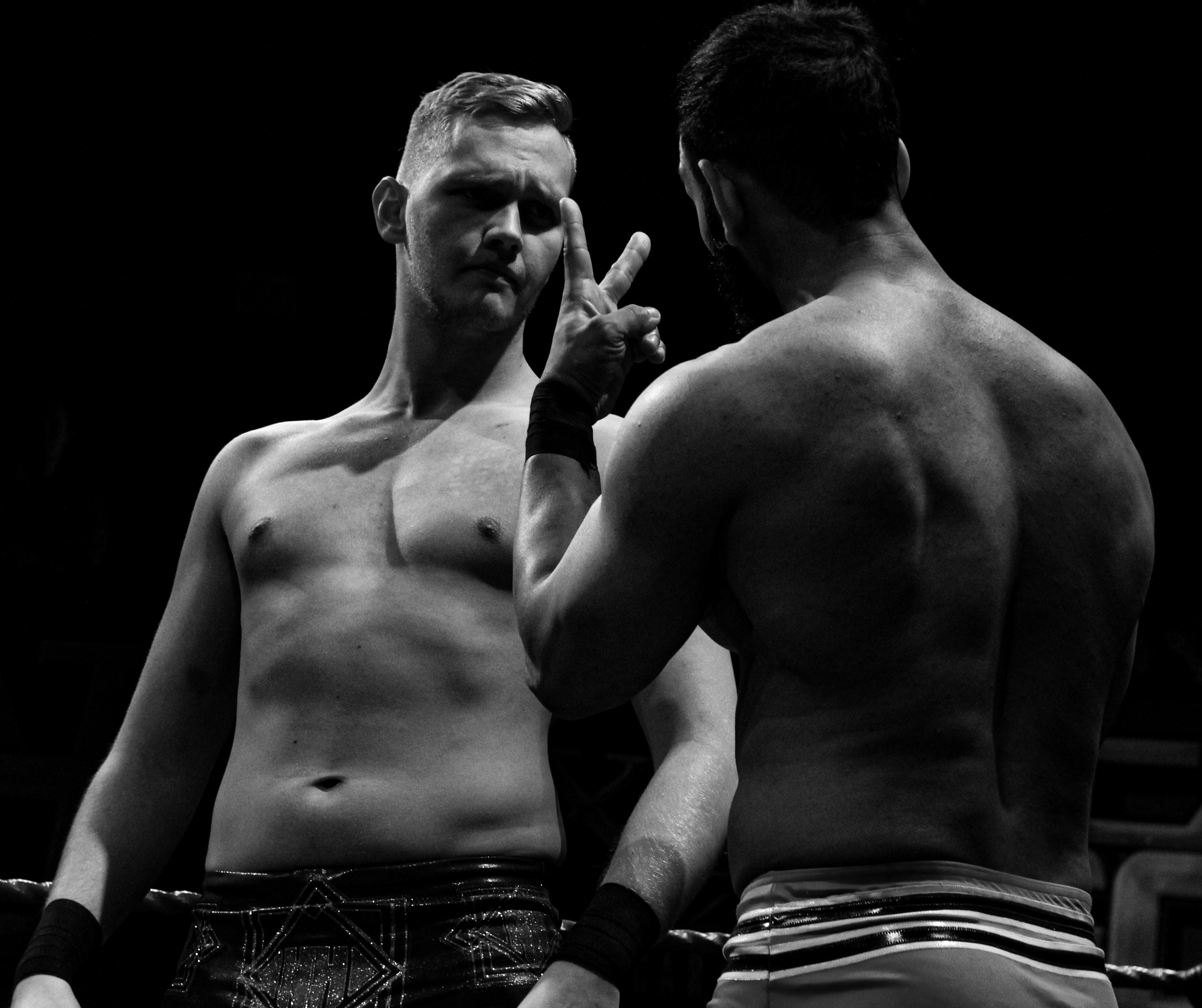
- Harras in March 2020, at 16 Carat Gold

Personal information
- Born: Norman Halberschmidt; 28 November 1996 (age 29) Rüthen, Soest, North Rhine-Westphalia, Germany.

Professional wrestling career
- Ring name: Norman Harras
- Billed height: 6 ft 5 in (1.96 m)
- Billed weight: 235 lb (107 kg)
- Trained by: Jay Skillet
- Debut: 21 July 2018

Norman Halberschmidt (born 28 November 1996), better known by his ring name Norman Harras, is a German professional wrestler. He is currently working for Westside Xtreme Wrestling (wXw), where he is a former two time wXw Shotgun Champion and former one-times wXw World Tag Team Champion with alongside Alex Duke.

== Professional wrestling career ==
=== Westside Xtreme Wrestling (2018–present) ===
Harras came to prominence in late 2019, at World Tag Team Festival. He was paired with David Starr, who was without a partner as Eddie Kingston had to pull out due to a family emergency. The previous night, at Inner Circle 8, Harras had replaced Veit Müller and teamed with Timothy Thatcher, in a loss to The WorkHorsemen (Anthony Henry and JD Drake). On night one, Harras and Starr defeated The Crown (Alexander James and Jurn Simmons), which led to James turning on Simmons. On night two, they were defeated by Pretty Bastards (Prince Ahura and Maggot), after Harras mistakenly struck Starr, before being pinned with a Redlight Driver by Maggot. On night three, in the final, Harras came out to make the save on Danny Burch and Oney Lorcan, following interference from Bobby Gunns. However, he turned on them and sided with Gunns and the Pretty Bastards, who went on to win the match and the vacant World Tag Team Championship.

On 18 January 2020, at Back to the Roots, Harras was involved in a Käfigschlacht match alongside Gunns and the Pretty Bastards, where they faced a team led by Avalanche, consisting of him, Starr, Julian Pace and Leon van Gasteren. They were defeated when Harras tapped out to Starr, who had got him in a crossface with a steel chair in his mouth. On 8 February, at a show in Obertraubling, Harras failed to qualify for 16 Carat Gold, where he was defeated by Pace. On night one of 16 Carat Gold, Harras appeared in interference spots with Gunns, during the Pretty Bastards' defeat to Jay-AA (Jay Skillet and Absolute Andy). On night two, he wrestled in a parejas increibles gauntlet match, where he was paired with Tarik. Neither man got along with each other, and they were eliminated by Black Taurus and Avalanche. The next afternoon at the We Love Wrestling Feature Event, Harras, the Pretty Bastards and Oliver Carter defeated The Four Pillars of SMASH (Tarik, Sebastian Suave, Tyson Dux and Brent Banks). Later, Gunns and his stable beat down on Jay-AA, after their first (and only) defence of the tag team title, before Pace and Scotty Davis came out to make the save.

In September, Harras began feuding with Avalanche, when he alleged that Harras had locked his dog in the basement of the wXw Academy. Avalanche wanted to fight Harras there and then, but Absolute Andy, now director of sports, could not allow that as there was no room on the card. Avalanche then claimed he would beat Harras in five minutes in a dog food match, which Andy agreed to. Later that night, Harras was defeated by Avalanche with 27 seconds left on the clock, and tried to escape the ring, only to fall face first into the dog food. On the September 18 episode of Shotgun, Harras jumped Avalanche with a chain, and threw a dog collar at him. Andy later booked a dog collar match between the two men, when Avalanche was fit to do so. On the September 25 episode of Shotgun, Harras defeated Avalanche by referee's decision, by hitting a low blow, and then choking him out with a chain. Avalanche was not satisfied with the dog collar match, and convinced Andy to book a match in the academy, which he won by submission, after putting Harras in a camel clutch with a chain in his mouth.

Since wXw's return in the summer, Gunns' stable (now known as Die Raucherpause) and Ezel (led by Metehan) had come to an agreement that neither stable would interfere in each other's business, with Harras often acting as the middleman. However, Gunns and Metehan were selected in the same block of the Catch Grand Prix, and would face each other in the final match. Harras was selected in the other block, and got off to a poor start, losing his first three matches. He ended the tournament with four points, only achieving wins over Emil Sitoci and Vincent Heisenberg. In backstage segments, Harras was seen consulting with Gunns, who along with Metehan, wanted to win the block outright. They attempted to do a bit of spot-fixing, but did not account for Avalanche beating Gunns. The final block match between Metehan and Gunns resulted in a double disqualification, and Metehan missed out on making the final (as he was tied on points with Cara Noir, who had defeated him earlier in the tournament). On 31 December, at Silvester Spezial, Metehan was set to face an unknown challenger for the Shotgun Championship. Harras found out that Absolute Andy was out of the country at a fitness camp, so he hacked into Andy's iPad, and sent a e-mail to the board of directors, booking himself as the challenger. Andy soon learnt that his iPad had been hacked, and interrupted the match by video, to add a stipulation that the loser would be fined €5,000. With that threat looming over them, Harras eventually defeated Metehan.

== Championships and accomplishments ==
- Pro Wrestling Illustrated
  - Ranked No. 364 of the top 500 singles wrestlers in the PWI 500 in 2021
- WrestlingKult
  - WrestlingKult No Limits Championship (1 time)
- Westside Xtreme Wrestling
  - wXw Shotgun Championship (2 times)
  - wXw World Tag Team Championship (1 time) – with Alex Duke
