= Marius Al-Ani =

German professional wrestler

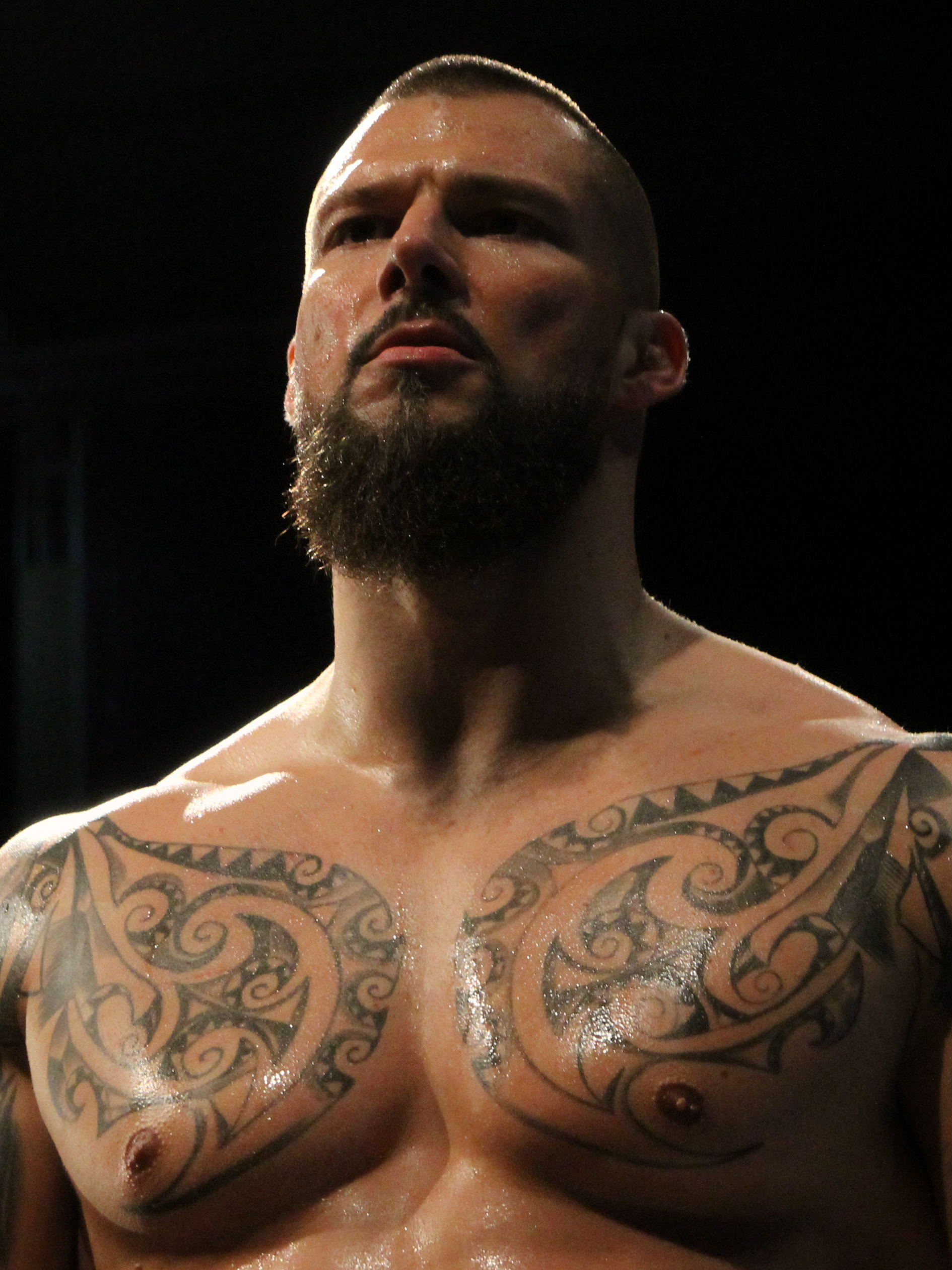
- Al-Ani at 16 Carat Gold in 2020

Personal information
- Born: 3 December 1990 (age 35) Eisenach, Germany

Professional wrestling career
- Ring name(s): Bergman; Al-Ani Star; Marius Al-Ani
- Billed height: 1.76 m (5 ft 9 in)
- Billed weight: 90 kg (198 lb)
- Trained by: Leon van Gasteren; Christian Eckstein
- Debut: 2011

Marius Al-Ani (born 3 December 1990) is a German professional wrestler, best known for working for the German promotion Westside Xtreme Wrestling (wXw).

== Professional wrestling career ==
=== Independent circuit (2011–present) ===
Al-Ani competed at the WWNLive SuperShow - Mercury Rising 2019, an event promoted by World Wrestling Network (WWN) on April 5, where he teamed up with Alexander James and Jurn Simmons as Team wXw in a losing effort to The Unwanted (Eddie Kingston, Joe Gacy and Shane Strickland) in a six-man tag team match. At PROGRESS Germany Tour 2018: Hamburg, a cross-over event produced by Progress Wrestling and wXw, he teamed up with Absolute Andy and Bobby Gunns in a losing effort to Chris Brookes, David Starr and Walter. Al-Ani also worked for European Wrestling Promotion where he won the Axel Dieter Memorial Cup at EWP Christmas Wrestling 2019 by defeating PJ Black in the finals which took place on December 21. Al-Ani competed at NEW Snakepit 2019, an event promoted by New European Championship Wrestling on September 7, where he won and lost the NEW World Internet Championship the same night battling Fast Time Moodo.

=== Westside Xtreme Wrestling (2014–2022, 2025–present) ===
Al-Ani is best known for his tenure with Westside Xtreme Wrestling. He debuted for the promotion at wXw Drive Of Champions Tour: Fulda on May 17, 2014, where he fell short against Da Mack. At wXw 14th Anniversary Tour: Leipzig, a two-night event which began on November 1, 2014, he scored a victory against Axel Tischer on the second night. Al-Ani participated in the 2015 Mitteldeutschland Cup, where he reached the semi-finals at wXw More Than Wrestling Tour: Gotha, where he fell short to Ilja Dragunov on March 17, 2015. At wXw More Than Wrestling Tour: Finale - Shortcut To The Top, Al-Ani participated in a 30-man royal rumble match on June 20, 2015, where he competed against ither superstars such as the winner Grado, Jurn Simmons, Marty Scurll and Sha Samuels. At wXw Broken Rules XVI on October 22, 2016, he teamed up with Absolute Andy as A4 and defeated David Starr and Lio Rush to win the vacant wXw World Tag Team Championship. They defended the titles several times until they dropped them to The Young Lions (Lucky Kid and Tarkan Aslan) at wXw Superstars Of Wrestling 2017, a cross-over event produced by wXw and Lucha Underground on May 13, 2017. At 16 Carat Gold Tournament 2017, Al-Ani defeated J. T. Dunn in a first round match on the first night from March 10, but fell short to Walter on the second night in quarter-finals. On the third night, Al-Ani teamed up with Absolute Andy to successfully defend the wXw World Tag Team Championship in a street fight against The London Riots (James Davis and Rob Lynch). Al-Ani participated in the Mitteldeutschland Cup of 2017, with the first night taking place at wXw Fight Forever Tour 2017: Jena, where he defeated Pete Bouncer in the quarter-final on September 22. One day later on September 23, at Tour: Bautzen, he lost to John Klinger in the semi-finals. At the wXw World Tag League 2017, Al-Ani teamed up with his A4 partner Absolute Andy in a losing effort to Massive Product (David Starr and Jurn Simmons) in the first night of October 6. Two nights later, they finished the tournament with a total of three points after scoring a loss against The Spirit Squad (Kenny and Mikey). At wXw Shortcut To The Top 2018 on August 4, Al-Ani defeated Bobby Gunns to win the wXw Shotgun Championship. Al-Ani won the 2020 Catch Grand Prix by defeating Cara Noir in the finals on December 13, 2020. At wXw Dead End on April 9, 2021, he defeated Bobby Gunns to win the wXw Unified World Wrestling Championship.

On October 2, 2025, wXw announced that they have terminated their relationship with Al-Ani. This was a result of a now deleted TikTok, where Al-Ani wanted Germany to take a stand, using a WWII marching song in the background. As a result of the termination of the relationship, the wXw European Title, which he won by beating Metehan at wXw Fans Appreciation Night 2025 on May 23, was declared vacant.

== Other media ==
In 2016, Al-Ani participated at Ninja Warrior Germany on RTL, placing himself in 20th place, after five rounds of contest.

== Championships and accomplishments ==
- Unlimited Wrestling
  - Unlimited Wrestling Championship (1 time)
  - Unlimited Challenge Championship (1 time, current)
- European Wrestling Promotion
  - EWP Junior Championship (1 time)
  - EWP Tag Team Championship (1 time) – with Da Mack
  - Axel Dieter Memorial Cup (2019)
- German Wrestling Federation
  - GWF Tag Team Championship (1 time) – with Tim Stübing
- Independent Wrestling Innovation
  - IWI Tag Team Championship (1 time) – with Hektor Invictus
- Next Step Wrestling
  - Next Step Heavyweight Championship (1 time)
- New European Championship Wrestling
  - NEW World Internet Championship (1 time)
- Power Of Wrestling
  - POW Intercontinental Championship (1 time)
- Pro Wrestling Illustrated
  - Ranked No. 163 of the top 500 singles wrestlers in the PWI 500 in 2021
- Swiss Wrestling Entertainment
  - SWE Championship (1 time)
- Independent Pro Wrestling Germany
  - IPW Germany Tag Team Championship (1 time) with Hektor Invictus
- Prime Time Wrestling/ Wrestling World Austria
  - PTW/WWA World Championship (1 time, inaugural)
- Westside Xtreme Wrestling
  - wXw Unified World Wrestling Championship (1 time)
  - wXw Shotgun Championship (1 time)
  - wXw European Championship (1 time)
  - wXw World Tag Team Championship (1 time) – with Absolute Andy
  - wXw Catch Grand Prix (2020)
  - Mitteldeutschland Cup (2018, 2019)
  - wXw Shotgun Championship Number One Contender's Tournament (2018)
  - Ostwestfalen Cup (2018)
  - Road to 16 Carat Gold (2018)
