= WXw European Championship =

Professional wrestling championship

wXw European Championship
- Current title design

Details
- Promotion: Westside Xtreme Wrestling
- Date established: June 2024
- Current champion: Laurance Roman
- Date won: September 27, 2026
Statistics
- First champion: Aigle Blanc
- Longest reign: Mike D Vecchio (226 days)
- Shortest reign: Aigle Blanc (77 days)
- Oldest champion: Marius Al-Ani (35 years, 4 days)
- Youngest champion: Zoltan (18 years (Note: Zoltan's birth date is documented to be in the first half of 2008, although not exactly known.))
- Heaviest champion: Mike D Vecchio (242 lbs)
- Lightest champion: Aigle Blanc (154 lbs)

The wXw European Championship is a professional wrestling championship created and promoted by the German promotion Westside Xtreme Wrestling. There have been a total of six reigns and two vacancies shared among six different champions. The current champion is Laurance Roman, who is in his first reign. He won the title by defeating Dieter Schwartz on September 27, 2026, at wXw Pro-Wrestling Grand Prix 2026 Day 3.

== Title history ==
The first champion was crowned on July 20, 2024, when Aigle Blanc defeated Mike D Vecchio in the finals of an eight-man tournament.

=== Inaugural tournament (2024) ===
Quarterfinals; July 20
Aigle Blanc	Pin
Red Scorpion	4:12
Peter Tihanyi	11:23
Elijah Blum	Pin
Luke Jacobs	Pin
Aytac	7:51
Jacob Crane	7:06
Mike D Vecchio	Pin

Semifinals; July 20
Aigle Blanc	Pin
Elijah Blum	6:57
Luke Jacobs	7:54
Mike D Vecchio	Pin

Final; July 20
Aigle Blanc	Pin
Mike D Vecchio	11:12

== Reigns ==
As of November 6, 2026, there have been a total of seven title reigns shared between seven wrestlers and one vacancy. The current champion is Laurance Roman.

Key
No.	Overall reign number
Reign	Reign number for the specific champion
Days	Number of days held
+	Current reign is changing daily

No.	Champion	Championship change			Reign statistics		Notes	Ref.
No.	Champion	Date	Event	Location	Reign	Days	Notes	Ref.
1	Aigle Blanc	July 20, 2024	wXw Wrestling-EM	Frankfurt, Germany	1	77	Defeated Mike D Vecchio in a tournament final to become the inaugural champion.	
2	Mike D Vecchio	October 5, 2024	wXw World Tag Team Festival 2024; Night 2	Oberhausen, Germany	1	227		
—	Vacated	May 20, 2025	—	—	—	—	Vacated due to Vecchio suffering a knee injury	
3	Marius Al-Ani	May 23, 2025	wXw Fans Appreciation Night 2025	Hamburg, Germany	1	132	Defeated Metehan to win the vacant title.	
—	Vacated	October 2, 2025	—	—	—	—	Vacated after WXW cut ties with Marius Al-Ani due to a controversial TikTok video of the latter.	
4	Ricky Sosa	December 13, 2025	wXw 25th Anniversary	Oberhausen, Germany	1	119	Defeated Joseph Fenech Jr. and Zoltan in a three-way match to win the vacant title.	
5	Zoltan	April 11, 2026	wXw We Love Wrestling #76	Dresden, Germany	1	126		
6	Dieter Schwartz	August 15, 2026	wXw Shortcut To The Top 2026	Oberhausen, Germany	1	43		
7	Laurance Roman	September 27, 2026	wXw Pro-Wrestling Grand Prix 2026 - Day 3	Oberhausen, Germany	1	40+		

== See also ==
- WWE European Championship
- TNA International Championship
