= Absolute Andy =

German professional wrestler (1983–2023)

Personal information
- Born: Andreas Ullmann; 22 September 1983 Nuremberg, Bavaria, West Germany
- Died: 23 November 2023 (aged 40) Germany

Professional wrestling career
- Ring name(s): Absolute Andy; Fake Steve Corino; Ghetto Boy Andy; Mr. Erotic
- Billed height: 6 ft 3 in (1.91 m)
- Billed weight: 275 lb (125 kg)
- Trained by: Chris Hero; Michael Kovac; Joe E. Legend; Samoa Joe; Sick
- Debut: 18 October 2003

Andreas Ullmann (22 September 1983 – 23 November 2023), better known by his ring name Absolute Andy, was a German professional wrestler. He was best known for his work with Westside Xtreme Wrestling (wXw).

In wXw, he was a Grand Slam Champion, having been a two-time Unified World Wrestling Champion, a one-time Shotgun Champion, a five-time World Tag Team Champion and the 2018 winner of 16 Carat Gold. He had appeared for the promotion since the mid-2000s, and referred to himself as "The Veteran".

== Professional wrestling career ==
=== Westside Xtreme Wrestling (2006–2023) ===
Ullmann entered wrestling in 2003. He began wrestling for Westside Xtreme Wrestling under the ring name Absolute Andy in 2006, having also made an appearance under a different ring name the previous year. He was brought in for True Colors, a co-production between wXw and German Stampede Wrestling (GSW), with the latter promotion being the one he debuted in. In 2007, Andy was predominantly used in the tag division; he twice won the World Tag Team Championship alongside partners Josh Abercrombie and Steve Douglas, with both victories over Murat Bosporus and Wesley Croton. He and Douglas were defeated by Chris Hero and Marc Roudin at the 7th Anniversary show, and won the title back the following June, enjoying a short second reign, before dropping it to Doug Williams and Martin Stone. At True Colors, Andy won his first title opportunity for the World Heavyweight Championship, but was defeated by John Klinger, who he had been feuding with for much of the year. In May 2009, he won the World Heavyweight Championship for the first time, defeating Bryan Danielson at Dead End Beta, and remained the champion until December, when Douglas defeated him at the 9th Anniversary show.

In the years after this, Andy went on to suffer a six-year drought, and despite teaming again with Douglas and more prominently, with Klinger, he was unable to regain the World Tag Team Championship. In April 2016, he began teaming with Marius Al-Ani under the name A4, and at Broken Rules, they defeated the pairing of David Starr and Lio Rush to win the vacant tag team championship. This reign lasted until May 2017, where they were defeated by The Young Lions (Lucky Kid and Tarkan Aslan), and A4 would continue to feud with members of Rise for the next couple of months. A4 would break up on night three of World Tag Team League, when Andy turned on Al-Ani after their loss to The Spirit Squad (Kenny and Mikey). At 16 Carat Gold, Andy defeated Starr in the tournament final, having largely cheated his way to get there in victories over Al-Ani, Matt Riddle and Timothy Thatcher. Andy then feuded with Ilja Dragunov for the Unified World Wrestling Championship, and defeated him for the title at Shortcut to the Top. However, he would later suffer a shoulder injury, causing a proposed three-way match between, him, Dragunov and Bobby Gunns at World Tag Team League to be cancelled. Despite Andy's injury, the title was not vacated, and Dragunov was named interim champion, after defeating Gunns on night two of World Tag Team League.

The following month at Broken Rules, Andy defeated Gunns in an #1 contender match for the interim title, and during the Shotgun tour, he defeated Dragunov to become the champion outright. His feuds with Dragunov and Gunns both ended in early 2019; he defeated Dragunov in a Käfigschlacht match at Back to the Roots, and Gunns defeated him for the title on night two of 16 Carat Gold, ending his reign at 217 days. Afterwards, Andy started allying himself with Jay FK (Jay Skillet and Francis Kaspin), who he had occasionally teamed with in the past. He regularly began teaming with Jay FK from May onwards, and after Kaspin was ruled out of World Tag Team League with a spinal injury, Andy replaced him, forming Jay-AA. At the event, Jay-AA went out in the first round to Pretty Bastards (Maggot and Prince Ahura). Over time, his character gained some comedic elements to it, and he became obsessed with winning the Shotgun Championship. A backstage quarrel led to director of sports Karsten Beck booking a four-way match for the title at the 19th Anniversary show, which was won by Skillet. At Back to the Roots, Andy unsuccessfully challenged him for the title, in what would be Skillet's only singles title defence in the promotion.

While Andy did not qualify for 16 Carat Gold, he found another way to get there through the tag division, as Jay-AA defeated Jordan Devlin and Scotty Davis at Dead End to win a title shot, and in the process, cementing their face turn. On night one of 16 Carat Gold, Jay-AA defeated Pretty Bastards on night one to become the tag team champions. On night two, they held a parejas increibles gauntlet match, which was won by The Young Guns (Ethan Allen and Luke Jacobs). On night three, Jay-AA defeated The Young Guns, in what became their only defence of the title as a tag team. Jay-AA's reign as tag team champions was affected by Germany's handling of the COVID-19 pandemic and Skillet's departure from the promotion, following allegations of harassment. Andy's role in the promotion also changed during this period, becoming director of sports, since Beck was considered susceptible from contracting COVID-19. On 19 June, Jay-AA dropped the title back to Pretty Bastards (later aired on 3 July episode of Shotgun, in a heavily edited match, which only showed Andy being rolled up for the pin). After this, Andy wrestled in two more matches: in the annual Shortcut to the Top match and in an eight man tag team match on 2 October episode of Shotgun, which was part of the Die Raucherpause–Ezel storyline.

As director of sports, Andy developed a rivalry of sorts with Norman Harras. During Harras' feud with Avalanche, in which Avalanche alleged that Harras locked his dog in the basement of the wXw Academy, Andy denied an impromptu match between the two men as there was no room as there was no room on the card. He then agreed to a dog food match with a five-minute stipulation, which Harras lost. After Harras attacked Avalanche, Andy booked a dog collar match, when Avalanche was fit to do so. Harras won the match by referee's decision. Avalanche was unsatisfied with the manner of his defeat, and convinced Andy to book a match in the academy, which he won by submission. The next notable interaction Andy had with Harras came at Silvester Spezial, even though in storyline, he was out of the country attending a fitness camp. At the event, Metehan was set to face an unknown challenger for the Shotgun Championship. Harras hacked into Andy's iPad, and sent a e-mail to the board of directors, booking himself as the challenger. Andy soon learnt that his iPad had been hacked, and interrupted the match by video, to add a stipulation that the loser would be fined €5,000. With that threat looming over them, Harras eventually defeated Metehan. At the 2021 Catch Grand Prix, it was announced that Andy had stepped down as director of sports, and he was succeeded by Francis Kaspin. He returned to the promotion at the 21st Anniversary show, as the surprise challenger to Harras, who had regained the Shotgun Championship the previous night. Andy defeated Harras within three minutes, and in capturing the championship he so coveted, he also became a Grand Slam Champion. At Back to the Roots, Andy successfully defended the Shotgun Championship against Dennis Dullnig, but was unable to attend the 16 Carat Gold shows and had to vacate it. Ultimately, the Shotgun title match became the final one that Andy wrestled, as he died in November 2023.

== Personal life and death ==
Andreas Ullmann was born in Nuremberg, Bavaria, West Germany on 22 September 1983.

Outside of professional wrestling, Ullmann stood for local council in Hilpoltstein for the Christian Social Union in Bavaria party. According to his Instagram account, he had also worked as a motivational speaker.

Ullmann died on 23 November 2023, at the age of 40. His death was announced two days later by Westside Xtreme Wrestling.

== Championships and accomplishments ==
- Catch Wrestling Norddeutschland
  - Deutsche Meisterschaft Championship (1 time)
- Fighting Spirit Federation
  - La Reunion Tournament (2008)
- German Hurricane Wrestling
  - GHW Heavyweight Championship (1 time)
- German Stampede Wrestling
  - GSW World Heavyweight Championship (1 time)
  - GSW Breakthrough Championship (1 time)
  - GSW Tag Team Championship (1 time) – with Michael Kovac
  - Battlefield Tournament (2007)
  - GSW Breakthrough Championship Tournament (2006)
- German Wrestling Promotion
  - GWP World Championship (2 times)
  - WrestlingCorner.de Championship (2 times)
- Ligaunabhängig
  - Dragonhearts Championship (1 time)
- Professional Wrestling Alliance
  - PWA Juniorenmeisterschaft Championship (1 time)
- Pro Wrestling Illustrated
  - Ranked No. 237 of the top 500 singles wrestlers in the PWI 500 in 2018
- Swiss Championship Wrestling
  - SCW Heavyweight Championship (1 time)
- Ultimate Kombat Wrestling Association
  - UKWA Championship (1 time)
- WrestlingKULT
  - WrestlingKULT Championship (1 time)
- Westside Xtreme Wrestling
  - wXw Unified World Wrestling Championship (Note: During Andy's first reign, the title was called the wXw World Heavyweight Championship) (2 times)
  - wXw Shotgun Championship (1 time)
  - wXw World Tag Team Championship (5 times) – with Josh Abercrombie (1), Steve Douglas (2), Marius Al-Ani (1), Jay Skillet (1)
  - 16 Carat Gold Tournament (2018)
  - Mitteldeutschland Cup (2017)
  - Ostdeutschland Cup (2009)
  - wXw Hall Of Famer (2024)
