= Bobby Gunns =

German professional wrestler

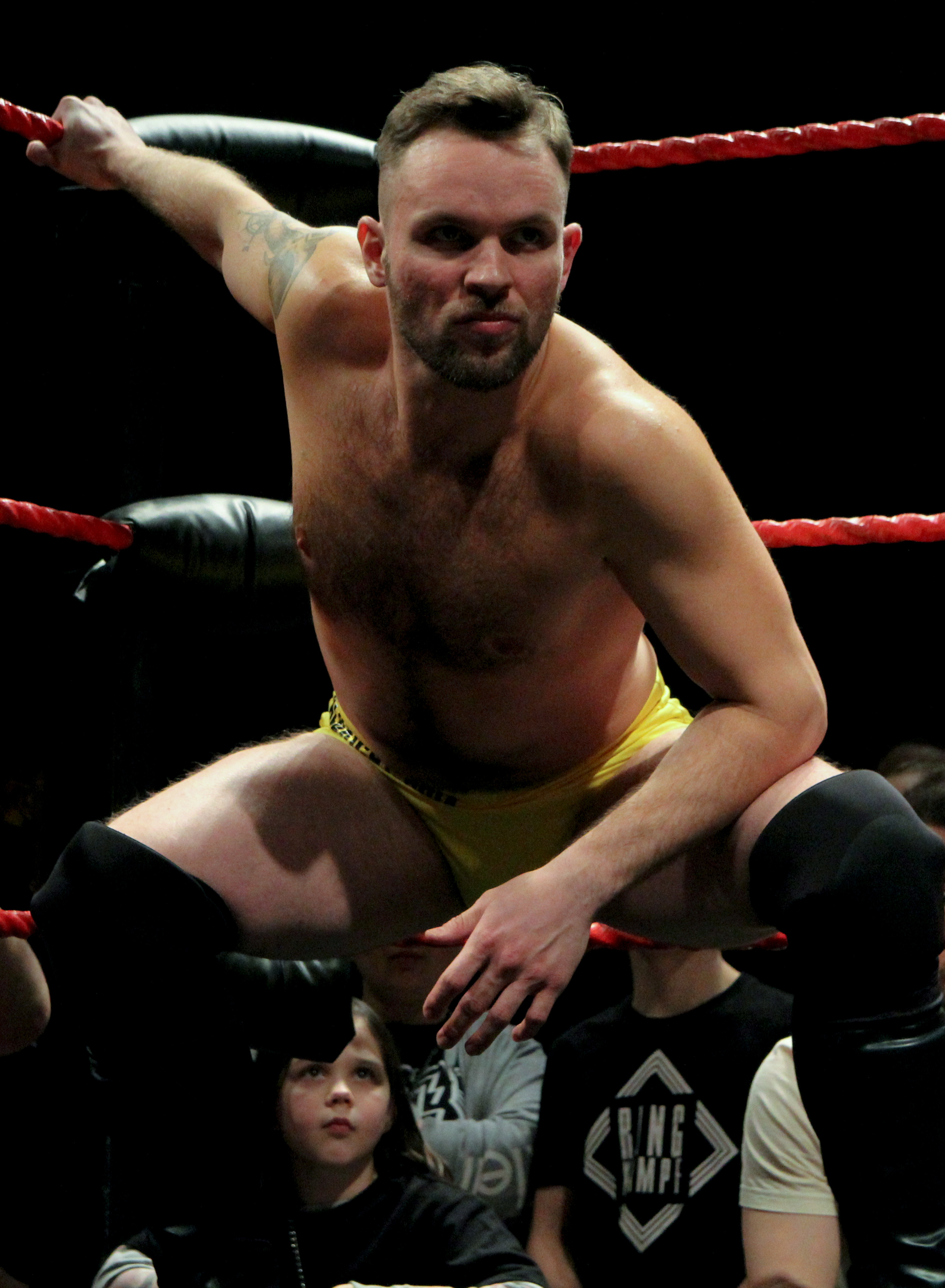
- Gunns in March 2020 at 16 Carat Gold

Personal information
- Born: Robert Schild; 28 December 1992 (age 33) Mülheim, North Rhine-Westphalia, Germany
- Family: Vinny Vortex (brother)

Professional wrestling career
- Ring name(s): Bobby Gunns; Robert Schild
- Billed height: 5 ft 10 in (1.78 m)
- Billed weight: 202 lb (92 kg)
- Billed from: Bremen, Germany
- Trained by: Westside Dojo (Note: Gunns began training at the Westside Dojo in 2011, following a successful tryout under the tutelage of Tommy End. He was coached by Toby Blunt, Kim Ray, Karsten Beck and Christian Jakobi up until his debut, and received further training from Walter and Axel Tischer on weekends.); BJW Dojo (Note: During a 2012 tour to Japan, in conjunction with Big Japan Pro Wrestling (BJW), Gunns was trained by Yuji Okabayashi and Yuki Ishikawa.)
- Debut: 14 July 2012

Robert Schild (born 28 December 1992), better known by his ring name Bobby Gunns, is a German professional wrestler. He works for Westside Xtreme Wrestling (wXw).

== Early life ==
Schild comes from an amateur wrestling background, and was introduced to professional wrestling after watching an episode of SmackDown on television; he cites Kurt Angle as an early influence. He later began watching New Japan Pro-Wrestling (NJPW), and in 2008, attended wXw 16 Carat Gold. Afterwards, he became a regular at wXw events, and started training at the Westside Dojo (firstly in Bottrop and then in Oberhausen), before making his debut in 2012.

== Professional wrestling career ==
=== Westside Xtreme Wrestling (2014–present) ===
In the first few years of his career, he was mainly used in tag team matches alongside his brother, but in September 2014, he changed his ring name to Bobby Gunns and adopted a smoking gimmick, as a way to elicit heat from the crowd. In 2016, Gunns was used more prominently as a singles competitor, and by the end of the year, was involved in title shots for the wXw Shotgun Championship. The following year saw him begin his unbeaten record in Hamburg with a win over Da Mack, (Note: Gunns is a supporter of Werder Bremen, and has used the historic rivalry with Hamburger SV to his advantage, often bringing club merchandise to the ring to antagonise the crowd.) and at the 17th Anniversary show, he won the Shotgun Championship, defeating Ivan Kiev for the title.

In 2018, Gunns successfully defended his Shotgun Championship over the course of the year, as well as establishing a long-running feud with Absolute Andy. He was finally defeated by Marius Al-Ani at Shortcut to the Top, but later in the night, won the battle royal for a title shot at the wXw Unified World Wrestling Championship. Gunns would continue feuding with Andy as well as Ilja Dragunov, but when Andy injured his shoulder, a match between Gunns and Dragunov for the interim title was scheduled. Notable for having the longest ever wrestling chant, Dragunov prevailed over Gunns, and at Broken Rules, Andy defeated him in an #1 contender match for the interim title (although he still had his title shot). In 2019, Gunns began the year in dominant fashion, and defeated Andy to become the Unified World Wrestling Champion on night two of 16 Carat Gold. Gunns consistently defended the title throughout the year up until October, with his only losses during this period were outside of title matches: in a tag team match against Ringkampf (Veit Müller and Walter) and in a Ambition match against Daniel Makabe. His 210-day reign ended on night two of World Tag Team Festival, when he was defeated by Timothy Thatcher. On night three, Gunns formed a new stable (later named Die Raucherpause), when he and Norman Harras, assisted Pretty Bastards (Maggot and Prince Ahura) in winning the tournament and the vacant wXw World Tag Team Championship. At the 19th Anniversary show, Gunns won the title back in a four-way match with Thatcher, Dragunov and David Starr.

On 7 March 2020, Gunns' first defence of the title in his second reign was on night two of 16 Carat Gold, where he defeated Starr in a title vs. career match. Due to Germany's handling of the COVID-19 pandemic, he did not appear in the promotion until August, where he defeated Tristan Archer at Shortcut to the Top. Mike Schwarz won the aforementioned event, and on the 25 September episode of Shotgun, Gunns defeated him in a match of his choosing, a Disko Wämmserei match. Since wXw's return in the summer, Die Raucherpause and Ezel (led by Metehan), had come to an agreement that neither stable would interfere in each other's business, with Harras often acting as the middleman. On the 2 October episode of Shotgun, Gunns called in a favour to Metehan to use his lackeys Abdul and Aytac as replacements for Harras and Prince Ahura, who dropped out of an eight man tag team match. This backfired on Gunns, as he ended up being pinned by Emil Sitoci, who earned a title shot out of it, but Gunns managed to defeat him on the following episode of Shotgun. Despite their agreement, Gunns and Metehan were selected in the same block of the Catch Grand Prix, and would face each other in the final match. Gunns started off well, winning his first three matches, and stumbled when he and Cara Noir went to a time limit draw. At the same time, he was being consulted by Harras, and they attempted to do a bit of spot-fixing. However, neither man accounted for Avalanche beating Gunns. The final block match between Metehan and Gunns resulted in a double disqualification, and Metehan missed out on making the final (as he was tied on points with Noir, who had defeated him earlier in the tournament). Gunns ended the tournament with eight points, behind Avalanche, who he was tied on points with, but lost on a head-to-head ruling. The Catch Grand Prix was won by Al-Ani, who defeated Noir in the final and became the #1 contender to Gunns' title. With emphasis on Al-Ani's unbeaten run and Gunns' status as the longest reigning Unified World Wrestling Champion, (Note: Ares holds the longest ever title reign at 603 days, but Gunns' record is from when the title was unified with the wXw World Lightweight Championship in 2010.) the two men faced off against each other on 9 April 2020, at Dead End. At the event, Al-Ani defeated Gunns by hitting a superman punch followed by a Diamond Driver, ending his reign at 482 days.

== Championships and accomplishments ==
- Pro Wrestling Illustrated
  - Ranked No. 159 of the top 500 singles wrestlers in the PWI 500 in 2019
- Westside Xtreme Wrestling
  - wXw Unified World Wrestling Championship (2 times)
  - wXw Shotgun Championship (1 time)
  - wXw World Tag Team Championship (1 time) – with Michael Knight
  - AMBITION 13 (2022)
  - Shortcut to the Top (2018)

== Luchas de Apuestas record ==
Winner (wager)	Loser (wager)	Location	Event	Date	Notes
Bobby Gunns (title)	David Starr (wXw career)	Oberhausen, North Rhine-Westphalia, Germany	wXw 16 Carat Gold – Night Two	March 7, 2020	
