= Jay Skillet =

German wrestler

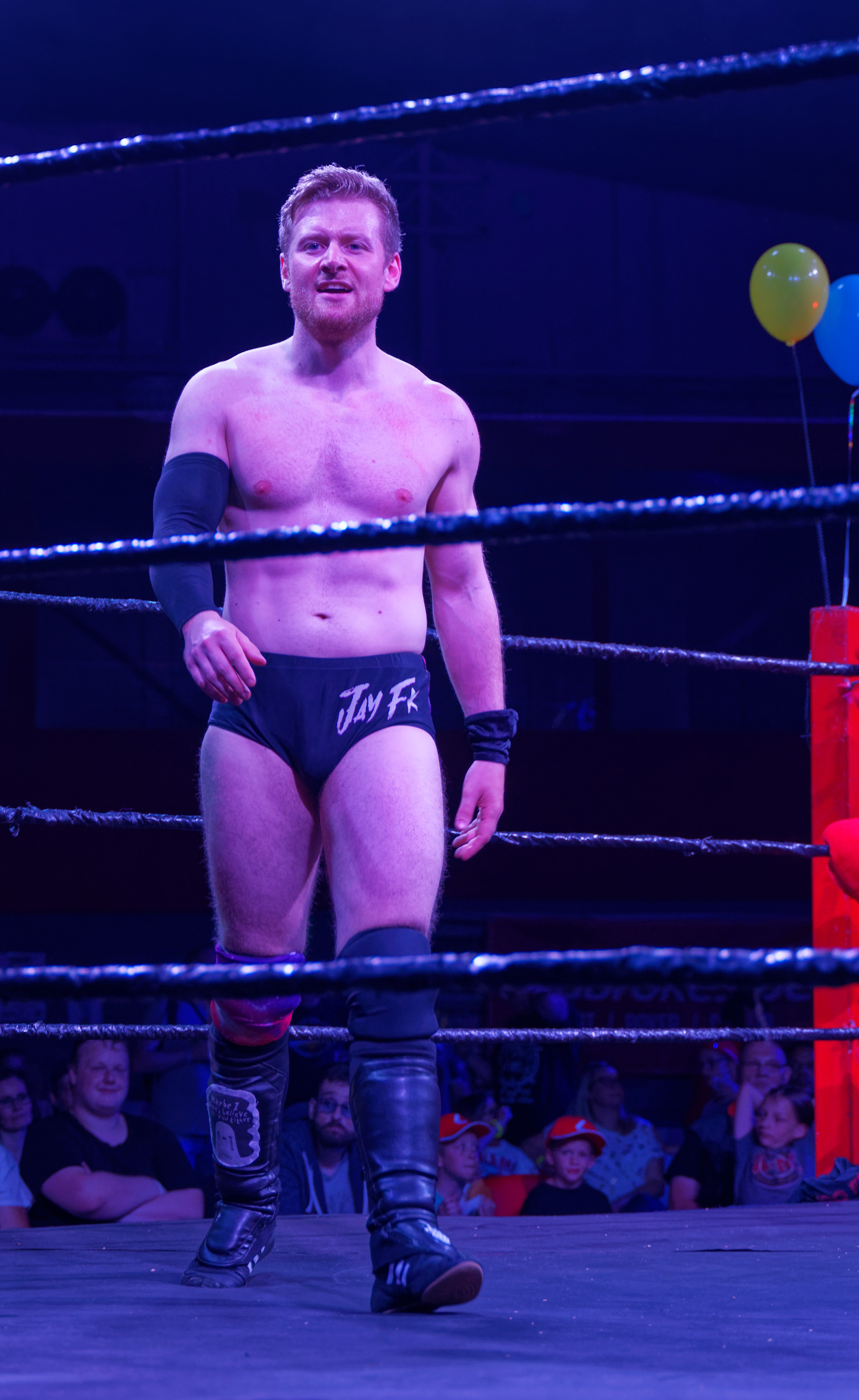
- Skillet in July 2019

Personal information
- Born: Jan Kronenberg; 14 September 1991 (age 35) Solingen, North Rhine-Westphalia, Germany

Professional wrestling career
- Ring name: Jay Skillet
- Billed height: 5 ft 10 in (1.78 m)
- Billed weight: 183 lb (83 kg)
- Trained by: Bad Bones; Emil Sitoci; Tommy End
- Debut: 18 September 2010

Jan Kronenberg (born 14 September 1991), better known by his ring name Jay Skillet, is a German professional wrestler. He is best known for his work in Westside Xtreme Wrestling (wXw).

== Professional wrestling career ==
=== Westside Xtreme Wrestling ===
==== 2011–2013 ====
On 12 March 2011, at 16 Carat Gold, Skillet made his debut for Westside Xtreme Wrestling (wXw), where he was squashed by Jon Ryan. On 2 July, at Dead End, Skillet teamed with Jason Hendrix, defeating Aaron Insane and Chris Rush. On 18 September, at Live in Mannheim, Skillet and Hendrix, now named The Wanderers, defeated The Mind (Big Van Walter and Karsten Beck) for the World Tag Team Championship. This reign saw them used as transitional champions, although they did defend the title once, with a win over the pairing of Adam Cole and Drew Gulak. On 18 September, at CZW Back In Germany, they were defeated by the Sumerian Death Squad (Michael Dante and Tommy End), ending their reign at 13 days. On 17 December, at True Colors, as part of the 16 Carat Gold qualification block, Skillet faced Kim Ray in a losing effort.

In January 2012, Skillet defeated Beck at Back to the Roots, but failed to make 16 Carat Gold as he went to a time limit draw with 2Face at a 18+ Underground event. On 12 February, at Live in Mannheim, Skillet began his trial series (which he would continue throughout the year), where he was defeated by Jonathan Gresham. He and Gresham tagged for the first time at 16 Carat Gold, where they defeated Keel Inkasso (Aaron Insane and Chris Rush). On 24 April, at Payback 5, they had their first title shot as a tag team, but were defeated by the Sumerian Death Squad. On 11 August, at the Fans Appreciation Weekend, Skillet and Gresham, now going by RockSkillet, won another title shot, after defeating The Leaders of the New School (Marty Scurll and Zack Sabre Jr.). The next night, RockSkillet won the World Tag Team Championship, defeating the Sumerian Death Squad in a two out of three falls match. On 2 November, at Fight Club, RockSkillet had their first defence of the title, defeating OI4K (Dave Crist and Jake Crist). On 8 December, at the 12th Anniversary show, Skillet failed to qualify for 16 Carat Gold, after he was defeated by Tommy End.

RockSkillet began 2013 with two successful title defences. On 19 January, at Back to the Roots, they defeated The Young Bucks (Matt Jackson and Nick Jackson), and on 2 February, at a show in Fulda, they defeated Champions Of Champions (Absolute Andy and Bad Bones) On 3 March, at 16 Carat Gold, The AUTsiders (Big Van Walter and Robert Dreissker) defeated RockSkillet, ending their reign at 203 days. On 28 March, at Die Kneipe #7, Skillet reunited The Wanderers with Jason Hendrix, and went on to feud with the AUTsiders and Keel Holding (Sasa Keel, Aaron Insane and Michael Isotov). On 6 July, at Broken Rulz, The Wanderers and Gebrüder Schild (Robert Schild and Vincent Schild) defeated the AUTsiders and Keel Holding in an eight-man tag team match. Later that night, in the Shortcut to the Top match, Skillet eliminated Insane, who had just eliminated Hendrix. He was then one of five wrestlers who was quickly eliminated by Walter. On 14 July, at Mannheim Mayhem, The Wanderers defeated Keel Holding in a Mannheim Mayhem match. On 17 August, at the Fans Appreciation Night, Skillet partnered Ricky Marvin in a loss to the AUTsiders for the World Tag Team Championship. The feud continued on the 13th Anniversary tour, where Skillet was defeated by members of the AUTsiders and Keel Holding, as well as Karsten Beck. His only win on the tour came in a four-way match against Beck, Kim Ray and Vincent Schild, and he ended the tour with a loss to 2Face. Apart from a single appearance in 2015, Skillet did not wrestle for wXw for the next three and half years.

==== 2017–2020 ====
Beginning in April 2017, Skillet started tagging with Francis Kaspin (a former Westside Dojo trainee), and their first match together was at a wXw Academy show. Skillet made his return to the promotion at Shortcut to the Top. In the aforementioned event, Skillet eliminated Young Money Chong, before Emil Sitoci eliminated him with a gutbuster. Afterwards, Skillet and Kaspin, now going by Jay FK, were mainly used in the tag division. Skillet had two unsuccessful #1 contendership matches in November and December; with the first at Broken Rules, a three-way match for the World Tag Team Championship between Sitoci and Dirty Dragan and eventual winners, Monster Consulting (Avalanche and Julian Nero), and the second at a show in Hamburg, against Bobby Gunns for the Shotgun Championship. Jay FK rounded out the year with a loss to Monster Consulting at the 17th Anniversary show.

In January 2018, Timothy Thatcher, impressed with Jay FK's recent wins, offered them a title shot. Skillet thought that Ringkampf considered them easy opponents, and in turn, showed disrespect to Thatcher and Walter. On February 8, at Dead End, Ringkampf defeated Jay FK, where Skillet tapped out to Thatcher's submission hold. Post-match, Ringkampf had their customary handshakes, which saw Skillet deciding to slap Walter, before reluctantly accepting the gesture. On 25 February, Skillet failed to qualify for 16 Carat Gold, when he was defeated by Mike Bailey in a three-way match, also involving Julian Pace. On March 10, at the event, Jay FK were in a #1 contendership four-way match against Monster Consulting, Mark Haskins and Matt Sydal and eventual winners Rise (Da Mack and Ivan Kiev). After 16 Carat Gold, Jay FK went on a winning streak, which lasted until they were defeated in Ludwigshafen by The Latin American Xchange (Santana and Ortiz). On 14 April, at True Colors, Jay FK were involved in a three-way match for the recently vacated tag team titles, against LAX and eventual winners, Monster Consulting. A few days later at a show in Gütersloh, a rematch between the three tag teams, saw Monster Consulting retain. During the summer, Jay FK began feuding with Monster Consulting and Rise (Ivan Kiev and Pete Bouncer). On 5 May, at Superstars of Wrestling, they turned on Monster Consulting after hitting Avalanche with a belt shot, and then running away with the belts. On 18 May, at Das 20. Mal Markthalle, Jay FK won a title shot by defeating Kiev and Bouncer. This happened on 4 August, at Shortcut to the Top, where Jay FK faced Monster Consulting and Rise in a three-way tables elimination match for the tag team titles. They were eliminated when Kiev and Bouncer hit a powerbomb on Skillet through a table. In the aforementioned event, Skillet teamed with Kaspin to eliminate Nero, but he was quickly eliminated by a Massive Boot from Jurn Simmons. On 31 August, at the Fans Appreciation Night in Hamburg, Jay FK were again defeated by Monster Consulting. The next day, at the Fans Appreciation Night in Oberhausen, Jay FK qualified for World Tag Team League by defeating Kiev and Bouncer and Dragan and Sitoci. At World Tag Team League, they were put in the same block as Monster Consulting, as well as Aussie Open (Kyle Fletcher and Mark Davis) and Team SPLX (Angélico and Jeff Cobb). On night one, Monster Consulting defeated them, but this turned out to be their only win in the block, and they had to vacate the tag team title. Jay FK defeated Angélico and Cobb on night two, and Aussie Open on night three to qualify for the final. In the main event, they defeated Calamari Catch Kings (Chris Brookes and Jonathan Gresham) to win the vacant title. On the November Shotgun tour, Jay FK took part in a nightly tournament consisting of international tag teams. However, they were thwarted on each occasion by Avalanche, who in light of Nero's neck injury, partnered T-K-O, and briefly reformed Cerberus with Ilja Dragunov. Despite this, Avalanche was not involved in Jay FK's first title defence at Broken Rules. In a three-way match, they defeated The Arrows Of Hungary (Dover and Icarus) and Coast 2 Coast (Leon St. Giovanni and Shaheem Ali). They would defeat The Arrows Of Hungary again for their second and final title defence at a show in Hamburg. At the 18th Anniversary show, Jay FK were defeated in a gauntlet match by Rise (Da Mack and Tarkan Aslan), ending their reign at 76 days.

Jay FK began 2019 with a win over the pairing of Walter and Veit Müller at Back to the Roots, after which, they were part of the title picture for the Tag Team Championship. On 15 February at Dead End, they were defeated by Kiev and Bouncer in their first title defence. On 9 March, at 16 Carat Gold, they were defeated in a three-way match that was won by Aussie Open. Jay FK started allying themselves with Absolute Andy, who they had occasionally teamed with in the past. They regularly began teaming with Andy from May onwards, and after Kaspin was ruled out of World Tag Team League with a spinal injury, Andy replaced him, forming Jay-AA. At the event, Jay-AA went out in the first round to Pretty Bastards (Maggot and Prince Ahura). In late November, Skillet was involved in title shots for the Shotgun Championship, but was unsuccessful on both occasions. A backstage quarrel between Skillet, Andy, Müller and Avalanche led to director of sports Karsten Beck booking a four-way match for the Shotgun Championship at the 19th Anniversary show. At the event, just as Andy was about to hit a superkick to Avalanche, Skillet popped up and rolled Andy to win the match and subsequently, his first singles title in the promotion. Upset over the manner of Skillet's victory, Andy wanted a title shot for the championship he had become obsessed with in recent months. This was granted, and the tag partners faced each other on 18 January 2020, at Back to the Roots. Skillet retained the title by rolling Andy up again. On February 15, Skillet dropped the title back to Avalanche at a show in Bielefeld, ending his reign at 63 days.

On February 21 at Dead End, Jay-AA defeated Jordan Devlin and Scotty Davis to win a title shot at 16 Carat Gold, cementing their face turn. On night one of 16 Carat Gold, Jay-AA defeated Pretty Bastards on night one to become the tag team champions. On night two, they held a parejas increibles gauntlet match, which was won by The Young Guns (Ethan Allen and Luke Jacobs). The next afternoon at the We Love Wrestling Feature Event, Jay-AA defeated The Young Guns, in what became their only defence of the title as a tag team. Post-match, they were beat down by Bobby Gunns' stable, before Davis and Julian Pace came out to make the save. Jay-AA's reign as tag team champions was affected by Germany's handling of the COVID-19 pandemic and Skillet's departure from the promotion, following allegations of harassment at the wXw Academy. By the time the allegations had come out, much of Shotgun had already been filmed, so Skillet was edited out of the show. Since Andy had replaced Karsten Beck as director of sports, it was also not feasible for Jay-AA to remain tag team champions, and on June 19, they dropped the title back to Pretty Bastards.

== Championships and accomplishments ==
- German Stampede Wrestling
  - GSW Breakthrough Championship (1 time)
- Westside Xtreme Wrestling
  - wXw Shotgun Championship (1 time)
  - wXw World Tag Team Championship (4 times) – with Jason Hendrix (1), Jonathan Gresham (1), Francis Kaspin (1), Absolute Andy (1)
  - World Tag League (2018) – Francis Kaspin
