= Josh Abercrombie =

American professional wrestler

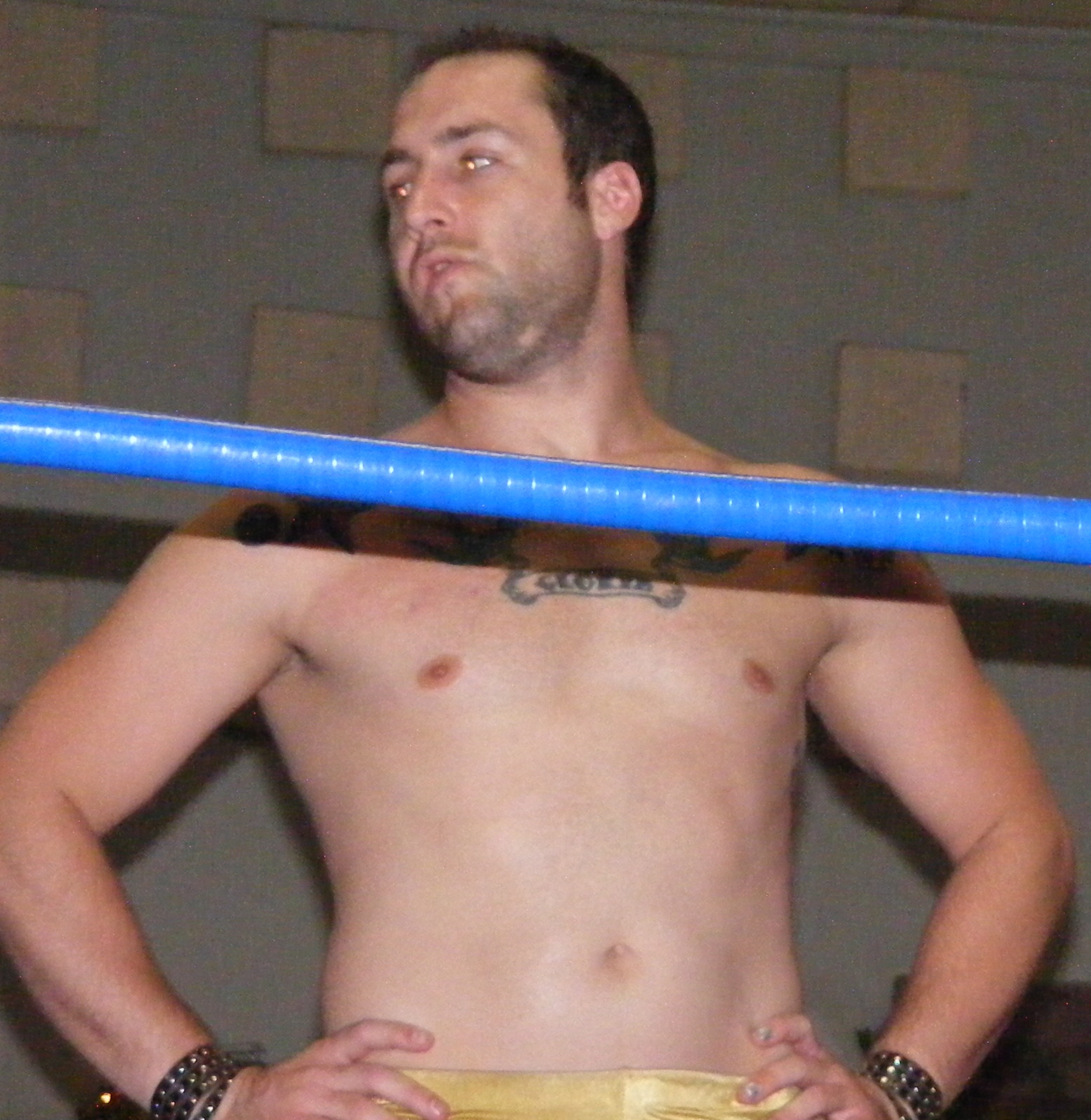
- Josh Raymond in Chikara, 2010

Personal information
- Born: Joshua Raymond; April 13, 1984 (age 42) Kalamazoo, Michigan, U.S.

Professional wrestling career
- Ring name(s): Billy Bong; Josh Abercrombie; Josh Raymond
- Billed height: 5 ft 9 in (1.75 m)
- Billed weight: 188 lb (85 kg)
- Trained by: Jimmy Jacobs; Frankie The Face; Truth Martini
- Debut: February 22, 2003

Joshua Raymond (born April 13, 1984), better known by his ring name Josh Abercrombie, is an American professional wrestler. He is best known for his tenures in Independent Wrestling Association Mid-South, Juggalo Championship Wrestling, Ring of Honor and the short-lived Wrestling Society X.

== Career ==
=== Independent Wrestling Association Mid-South ===
==== 2003–2005 ====
Raymond, under the ring name Josh Abercrombie, debuted for Ian Rotten's Independent Wrestling Association Mid-South promotion on October 23, 2003 in a match against Steve Stone. He continued competing across Midwestern independent promotions before returning to IWA Mid-South in October 2004.

Between January and February in 2005, he began a feud against Ian Rotten, which included a match that Rotten won as part of the NWA Indiana State Championship tournament. The feud culminated in a barbed wire rope match the next day. Abercrombie, afraid of being hurt, humorously entered the contest covered in bubble wrap, which was removed by Rotten a few minutes into the match. During the match, Rotten broke his hand as he punched Abercrombie in the head. Abercrombie used that to his advantage and managed to win the bout via submission.

Following his feud with Rotten, Abercrombie returned to singles competition while also teaming with Brandon Thomaselli in tag team matches. On April 9, he won the one-night "Simply The Best" tournament by beating Jonny Storm in the first round, and winning a four-way one fall bout by pinning El Generico that also involved Matt Cross and Sonjay Dutt.

Abercrombie then faced Light Heavyweight Champion Delirious at the promotion's debut at The Arena in Philadelphia, Pennsylvania on June 10 in. Abercrombie would go on to win the match and thus win his first title in the promotion. It was also his first win over Delirious, as the two had competed against each other a few times earlier in the year for the promotion.

During the summer of 2005, Abercrombie began a feud with Tyler Black over the title. The feud extended over several bouts, including a two out of three falls match on August 19, which Abercrombie won to retain his title as well as a highly praised Tables, Ladders, and Chairs match on September 9, which Abercrombie once again retained.

While holding the Light Heavyweight Title, Abercrombie entered the Ted Petty Invitational. On September 23, Abercrombie won in the first round after defeating Jamie Noble before losing in the second round to Chris Sabin.

Abercrombie then continued his feud with Black, leading to a title defense in a 30 Minute Iron Man tables match on October 15. During the last few seconds of the match, Black was able to superplex Abercrombie through two tables and managed to pin him, thus giving Black the win and the title. Following the match, Black offered a handshake, which Abercrombie accepted only to follow it up by spitting in Black's face. At the end of the night, Abercrombie fully turned heel as he and tag team partner Brandon Thomaselli interfered in the main event match of the Iron Saints (Sal and Vito Thomaselli) versus Ian Rotten and Justin Credible, as Abercrombie and Thomaselli aligned themselves with the Iron Saints and attacked Rotten, Credible, and many of the IWA Mid-South staff.

The new group of the Thomasellis and Abercrombie were later joined by Eddie Kingston, and even aligned for a short period with Heavyweight Champion Jimmy Jacobs. Abercrombie and Brandon explained their actions by stating that they were the hot homegrown act in the promotion during the first half of the year, but during the summer, Tyler Black and his tag team partner Marek Brave "took their spot" in the eyes of the fans and promoters. Annoyed by this, the pair went back to their family (specifically Brandon's) and decided to join the Iron Saints' war against the promotion.

==== 2006 ====
On January 12, 2006, Black retained the title by pinning Abercrombie with one of Abercrombie's own moves: the corkscrew 450° splash. Abercrombie demanded a rematch, stating that Black received multiple shots at him during his (Abercrombie's) title reign. Black and promoter Ian Rotten agreed with Ian making two stipulations for the match, the first being that no matter the outcome, the title rematch would be the last between the two for at least six months, and the second being that it could only end in pinfall by one competitor immediately after he hit his opponent with the corkscrew 450° splash.

The match took place eight days later on January 20. After hitting two corkscrew 450° splashes, Abercrombie scored the pinfall and won his second Light Heavyweight Championship. Abercrombie would later go on to hold the title a record-breaking 449 days, the longest reign in the title's history and the longest title reign of any kind in the history of the promotion.

Though still a heel, the crowd started getting more behind Abercrombie, and he soon split away from the Thomasellis and Kingston with his last interaction with them occurring on February 18 when he was forced to defend the title against Brandon, which he did. Abercrombie then reignited his feud with Tyler Black and on August 11, both took part in a "hair versus mustache match". In the weeks proceeding the match, Black grew a mustache of his own in mockery. Black would go on to win the match, but Abercrombie pointed out that a line in the contract for the match stipulated it was his hair versus Tyler's mustache. Abercrombie allowed Tyler to cut his hair, but when Black went for his mustache, Josh ran off, leaving him sporting a mullet.

Josh then challenged Tyler to one last match, with the title on the line, stipulating that this time the loser would leave the promotion for six months. Black accepted and the match took place on September 30, which effectively pulled Josh out of that weekend's Ted Petty Invitational. During the bout, IWA Mid-South staff member Jim Fannin pulled the referee from the ring while Black had a pinfall. In a major surprise, Jimmy Jacobs (who had left the promotion on January 20, 2006) ran in through the crowd and helped Abercrombie secure the victory. That, as well as the contract line that allowed him to keep his mustache, was part of a deal that Abercrombie and Fannin worked together, which in the same moment allowed Fannin an opportunity to get his hands on Jacobs. Fannin's hired guns, Mitch Page and Bull Pain, attacked Jacobs, who Fannin hated for tossing the IWA World Heavyweight Championship in the trash back in late 2005. Abercrombie felt horrible about double-crossing his friend and trainer, but did what he felt he had to do to stay on top.

=== Wrestling Society X (2006) ===
Abercrombie was part of the first season of Wrestling Society X, a promotion that aired on MTV. While in WSX, he competed under his real name as a part of a redneck tag team with Nate Webb and "White Trash" Johnny Webb known as the "Trailer Park Boyz".

=== Fight Sports Midwest (2007) ===
On March 17, 2007, Abercrombie was part of the debut event for Fight Sports Midwest, a promotion run out of Portage, Indiana. He pinned Austin Aries in a singles bout, and later interfered in a match between Arik Cannon and former rival Tyler Black, where he helped Cannon attack the Black. Abercrombie and Cannon were then challenged to an impromptu tag match by Black and S.A.M. (Super Amazing Monkey), a man in a gorilla outfit. Abercrombie and Cannon won, and after the match, they unmasked S.A.M. and revealed him to be Jimmy Jacobs before viciously attacking Jacobs' leg.

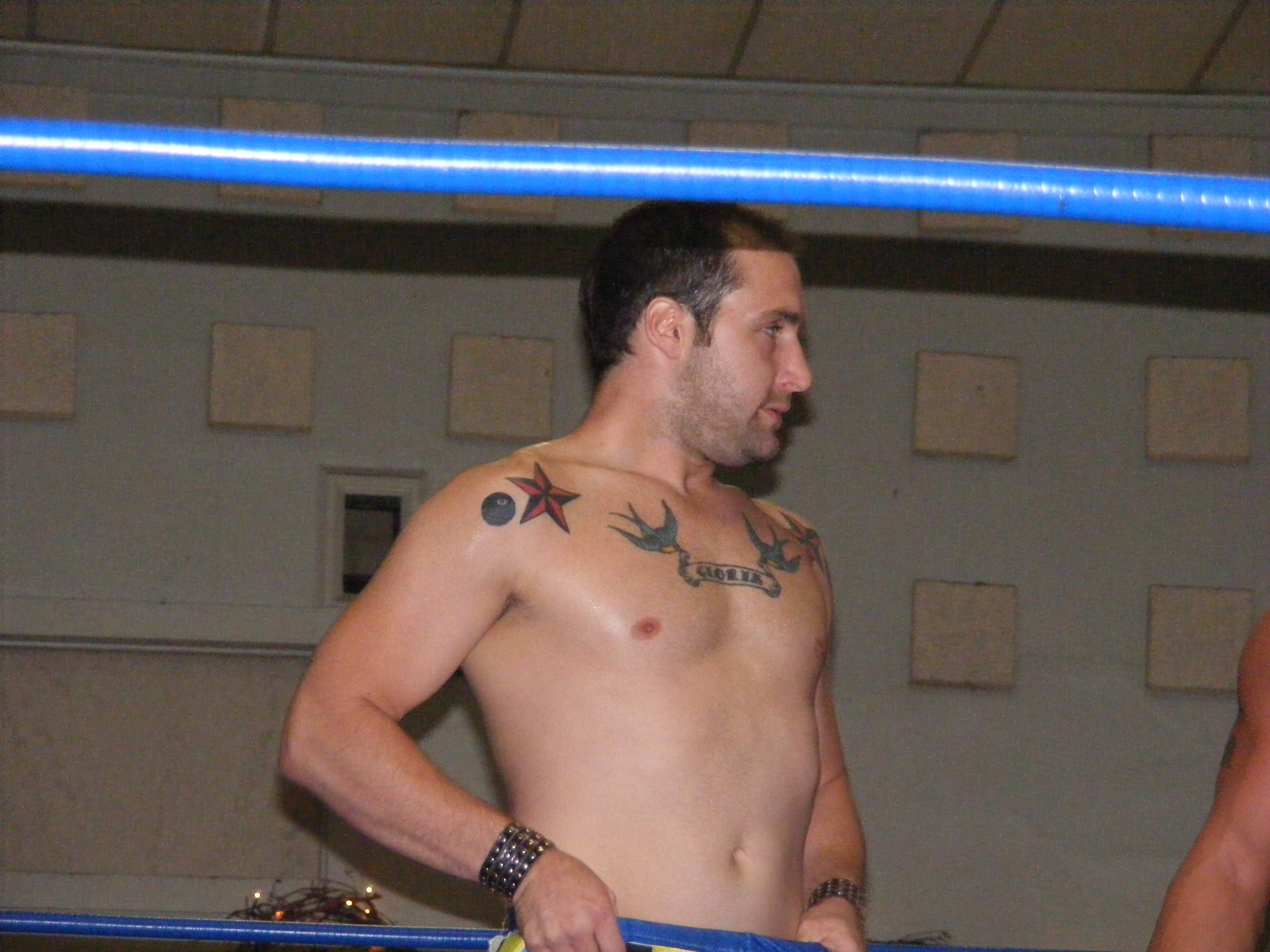
Josh Raymond in 2010

=== Return to IWA Mid-South (2009–2010) ===
Abercrombie returned to IWA Mid-South and reformed his WSX tag team The Trailer Park Boyz with "Spyder" Nate Webb.

=== Ring of Honor (2009–2010) ===
In late 2009, Raymond began wrestling at Ring of Honor Wrestling tapings under his real name, performing as part of the House of Truth with Roderick Strong and Christian Able.

== Championships and accomplishments ==
- All American Wrestling
  - AAW Tag Team Championship (2 times) – with Christin Able
  - Fate of Eight (2005)
- Juggalo Championship Wrestling
  - JCW Tag Team Championship (1 time) – with The Weedman
- Independence Pro Wrestling
  - IPW Grand Prix Heavyweight Championship(1 time)
  - IPW Tag Team Championship(1 time)(with Terry Van Avery)
  - IPW Michiana Championship(1 time)
- Independent Wrestling Association Mid-South
  - IWA Mid-South Light Heavyweight Championship (2 times)
  - IWA Mid-South Tag Team Championship (1 time)^{[a]} – with Mickie Knuckles and Devon Moore
  - Simply The Best (2005)
- Mr. Chainsaw Pro Wrestling
  - MCPW World Heavyweight Championship (1 time)
- Platinum Pro Wrestling
  - PPW Heavyweight Championship (1 time)
- Price of Glory Wrestling
  - POG Chaotic Championship (1 time)
  - POG Heavyweight Championship (3 times)
  - Glory Cup (2006)
- Superior Wrestling Alliance
  - SWA Light Heavyweight Championship (1 time)
- Thunderzone Wrestling
  - TW Cruiserweight Championship (1 time)
- Tri-Cities Championship Wrestling
  - TCCW Cruiserweight Championship (1 time)
- Underground Championship Wrestling / NWA Underground
  - UCW/NWA Underground Heavyweight Championship (1 time)
- Westside Xtreme Wrestling
  - wXw Tag Team Championship (1 time) – with Absolute Andy
- Xtreme Intense Championship Wrestling
  - XICW Light Heavyweight Championship (3 times)

== Footnotes ==
^{1} The IWA Mid-South Tag Team Championship was held jointly between Abercrombie, Knuckles and Moore using the Freebird Rule.
