= Da Mack =

German professional wrestler (born 1987)

Personal information
- Born: Mac Yeboah; 4 May 1987 (age 39) Hamburg, West Germany

Professional wrestling career
- Ring name: Da Mack
- Billed height: 6 ft 0 in (1.83 m)
- Billed weight: 185 lb (84 kg)
- Trained by: Karsten Kretschmer
- Debut: 1 March 2008
- Retired: 2020

Mac Yeboah (born 4 May 1987), better known by his ring name Da Mack, is a German retired professional wrestler. He is best known for his work in Westside Xtreme Wrestling (wXw).

== Professional wrestling career ==
=== Early career (2008–2013) ===
Da Mack made his debut in 2008, and his first match was against fellow Nordisch Fight Club graduate Axel Dieter Jr., who would quickly become his tag team partner in the early stages of his career. Under the name Hot & Spicy, they gained traction in German Stampede Wrestling (GSW), before appearing regularly in Westside Xtreme Wrestling from 2012 onwards.

=== Westside Xtreme Wrestling (2013–2019) ===
In November 2013, their first title shot, they defeated the AUTsiders (Big van Walter and Robert Dreissker), during the 13th Anniversary tour in Hamburg. Aside from dropping the title to the pairing of Matt Striker and Trent? at 16 Carat Gold (which they regained the following night), they remained tag champions for the better part of a year. Their reign ended during the 14th Anniversary tour at the SlamMania II event, when they were defeated by French Flavour (Lucas Di Leo and Peter Fischer). 2015 saw both men involved more in singles matches, but they were still prevalent in the tag division, reaching the semi-finals of that year's World Tag Team Tournament, where they were defeated by reDRagon (Bobby Fish and Kyle O'Reilly). On night three of 16 Carat Gold, Mack won the #1 contender's match for the Shotgun Championship over Emil Sitoci and Kim Ray, and defeated Sasa Keel at True Colors to win his first singles title in wXw. While he successfully defended the title during the More Than Wrestling Tour, tensions rose between him and Dieter, particularly when Dieter disagreed with him granting a rematch to Keel. This came to a head when Dieter interfered in Mack's champion vs. champion match against Jurn Simmons, resulting in a no contest, and in Mack's next match, he defeated Dieter to retain the title in his hometown. Following this, Mack and Dieter went their separate ways, and on night one of World Tag Team League, Mack was defeated by Pete Dunne, ending his reign at 181 days. Mack rounded out the year by being in the Shotgun title chase, but was unsuccessful in winning back the championship. In February 2017, Mack qualified for 16 Carat Gold, by participating in a mini-tournament and defeating Chris Colen in the final, however at the event, he went out in the first round to Cody Rhodes. Mack turned heel on night two of World Tag Team League by assisting John Klinger in his title match against Ilja Dragunov, and in the process, joined Rise. On night three of 16 Carat Gold, he and Klinger defeated Ringkampf (Timothy Thatcher and Walter) for the World Tag Team Championship, but the reign lasted a fortnight, when Klinger was indefinitely suspended by wXw. At True Colors, Mack was kicked out of the stable after the remaining members sided with Pete Bouncer, who had been a constant critic of Klinger. In November, Mack returned to the promotion by interfering in a Shotgun title match between Marius Al-Ani and Lucky Kid. By this time, Rise had split off into two separate factions consisting of faces and heels, so Mack's character did not change. At the 18th Anniversary show, he and Tarkan Aslan defeated Jay FK (Jay Skillet and Francis Kaspin) in a gauntlet match for the Tag Team Championship. After the match, they were attacked by Bouncer and Ivan Kiev who challenged them and Al-Ani to a Käfigschlacht match. At Back to the Roots, Mack and Aslan were defeated in the aforementioned match, ending their reign at 28 days, as well as their tenure in the stable. Afterwards, Mack was used sparingly in 2019, but was able to wrestle in Hamburg again at Lucky's insistence at Dead End, and was reunited with Dieter for a singles match against Jay FK on night three of 16 Carat Gold.

=== WWE (2016) ===
Outside of his native country, Mack appeared in WWE's Cruiserweight Classic in June 2016, where he was defeated in the first round by eventual winner TJ Perkins.

== Championships and accomplishments ==
- Baltic Championship Wrestling
  - BCW National Championship (1 time)
  - Tag Team Tournament (2009) - with Axel Dieter Jr.
- European Wrestling Promotion
  - EWP Tag Team Championship (2 times) – with Axel Dieter Jr. (1), Marius Al-Ani (1)
- German Stampede Wrestling
  - GSW Tag Team Championship (1 time) – with Axel Dieter Jr.
- Nordisch Fight Club
  - International NCW Cruiserweight Championship (1 time)
- Pro Wrestling Fighters
  - PWF Wrestling Cup (2012)
- Pro Wrestling Illustrated
  - Ranked No. 277 of the top 500 singles wrestlers in the PWI 500 in 2018
- Westside Xtreme Wrestling
  - wXw Shotgun Championship (1 time)
  - wXw World Tag Team Championship (4 times) – with Axel Dieter Jr. (2), John Klinger (1), Tarkan Aslan (1)
  - Road to 16 Carat Gold League (2017)
  - Swiss Open (2016)
