= WXw World Tag Team Championship =

Professional wrestling tag team championship

wXw World Tag Team Championship
- Official design of the titles

Details
- Promotion: Westside Xtreme Wrestling
- Date established: June 1, 2001
- Current champions: CSI (Luca De Leone and Nordino)
- Date won: August 15, 2026

Other names
- wXw Tag Team Championship (2001–2009); wXw World Tag Team Championship (2009–present)
Statistics
- First champions: Swi$$ Money Holding (Claudio Castagnoli and Ares)
- Most reigns: As tag team (3 reigns): Swi$$ Money Holding (Claudio Castagnoli and Ares); Planet Gojirah (Marc Empire and Robert Dreissker); As individual (8 reigns): Robert Dreissker
- Longest reign: Doug Williams and Martin Stone (371 days)
- Shortest reign: (<1 days): Legendary Thomas Blade and Scorpion; Absolute Andy and Josh Abercrombie

The wXw World Tag Team Championship is a professional wrestling world tag team championship contested for in the German professional wrestling promotion, Westside Xtreme Wrestling (wXw). The inaugural champions was Swi$$ Money Holding (Claudio Castagnoli and Ares). They claim to have bought the titles on June 1, 2001. The titles have been defended internationally in Japan, the United States, the Netherlands and the United Kingdom and on cards promoted by Combat Zone Wrestling, Pro Wrestling Noah, British Championship Wrestling, Big Japan Wrestling and others.

There have been a total of 75 reigns shared between 61 different teams, consisting of 91 distinctive champions. The current holders are Luca De Leone and Nordino in their first reign, having won the titles at Shortcut to the Top 2026 against Planet Gojirah.

== Title history ==
As of October 30, 2026.

Key
No.	Overall reign number
Reign	Reign number for the specific team—reign numbers for the individuals are in parentheses, if different
Days	Number of days held
<1	Reign lasted less than a day
+	Current reign is changing daily

No.	Champion	Championship change			Reign statistics		Notes	Ref.
No.	Champion	Date	Event	Location	Reign	Days	Notes	Ref.
1	Swi$$ Money Holding (Claudio Castagnoli and Ares)	June 1, 2001	House show	N/A	1	30	The Swiss Money Holding claimed to have bought the wXw Tag Team Championship, therefore were billed as the inaugural champions.	
2	Euro Threat (Thomas Blade and SigMasta Rappo)	July 1, 2001	Dead End	Essen, Germany	1	56		
3	Long and Thick (Bas and Mot van Kunder)	August 26, 2001	Broken Rulz	Essen, Germany	1	161		
4	Swi$$ Money Holding (Claudio Castagnoli and Ares)	February 3, 2002	Payback	Nürnberg, Germany	2	104		
5	Euro Threat (Crazy Johnny Tiger and SigMasta Rappo)	May 18, 2002	Dead End 2	Essen, Germany	1 (1, 2)	42	This was a Three Way Elimination match which also involves Crash Kid and U-Gin.	
6	Legendary Thomas Blade and Scorpion	June 29, 2002	Broken Rulz 2	Essen, Germany	1 (2, 1)	<1		
7	Swi$$ Money Holding (Claudio Castagnoli and Ares)	June 29, 2002	Broken Rulz 2	Essen, Germany	3	294		
8	Wrecking Crew (Legendary Thomas Blade and Chris Combat)	April 19, 2003	Got Eggs? - Day 2	Essen, Germany	1 (3, 1)	63		
9	The 69ers (Hate and Martin Nolte)	June 21, 2003	Dead End 3	Essen, Germany	1	189	This was a Four Way Elimination match which also involves (Darksoul and Mot van Kunder) and The New Beef Company (Steve Taurus and The Bull).	
10	The New 69ers (Hate and Tyrant)	December 27, 2003	3rd Anniversary HUSS-Mas	Essen, Germany	1 (2, 1)	266	Tyrant replaced Martin Nolte as Hate's tag team partner	
11	Next Generation Superstars (Steve Douglas and Alex Pain)	September 18, 2004	Full Force II - Good Times, Great Memories	Essen, Germany	1	84		
12	Dark Dream (X-dream and Darksoul)	December 11, 2004	4th Anniversary Show	Essen, Germany	1	147		
13	High Class Catch Club (Baron von Hagen and Adam Polak)	May 7, 2005	Full Force III	Essen, Germany	1	77		
14	GTS and Iceman	July 23, 2005	Full Force IV	Essen, Germany	1	273	This was a Street Fight match.	
15	High Class Catch Club (Baron von Hagen and Adam Polak)	April 22, 2006	Full Force V - The Final Encounter	Essen, Germany	2	147	This was a Two out of Three falls Losing Team Must Split Up match.	
16	Murat Bosporus and Wesley Croton	September 16, 2006	World Lightweight Tournament	Essen, Germany	1	133		
17	Absolute Andy and Josh Abercrombie	January 27, 2007	Back To The Roots VI	Oberhausen, Germany	1	<1		
18	Murat Bosporus and Wesley Croton	January 27, 2007	Back To The Roots VI	Oberhausen, Germany	2	98		
19	AbLas (Absolute Andy and Steve Douglas)	May 5, 2007	16 Carat Gold Tournament 2007 - Offer Show	Essen, Germany	1 (2, 1)	203		
20	Chris Hero and Marc Roudin	November 24, 2007	7th Anniversary Show - Strong Style Tournament	Oberhausen, Germany	1	211		
21	AbLas (Absolute Andy and Steve Douglas)	June 22, 2008	Dead End VIII - Day 2: European Navigation	Oberhausen, Germany	2 (3, 2)	34		
22	Doug Williams and Martin Stone	July 26, 2008	Broken Rulz VIII	Oberhausen, Germany	1	371		
23	The Kartel (Sha Samuels and Terry Frazier)	August 1, 2009	Fans Appreciation Night 2009	Oberhausen, Germany	1	63	This was a Street Fight match.	
24	The Switchblade Conspiracy (Jon Moxley and Sami Callihan)	October 3, 2009	True Colors 2009 - World Tag Team Title Tournament	Oberhausen, Germany	1	310	After winning the Tag Team Championship, The Switchblade Conspiracy made the titles to an World Tag Team Championship	
—	Vacated	August 9, 2010	—	—	—	—	Because The Switchblade Conspiracy were not able to be booked from wXw in Europe anymore, wXw have stripped The Switchblade Conspiracy of the World Tag Team Championship	
25	Oberhausen Terror Corps (Bad Bones and Carnage)	September 11, 2010	True Colors 2010	Oberhausen, Germany	1	183	Defeated The Kartel (Sha Samuels and Terry Frazier) for the vacant Championship.	
26	The Mind (Adam Polak and Karsten Beck)	March 13, 2011	16 Carat Gold 2011 - Day 3	Oberhausen, Germany	1 (3, 1)	189	This was a Two On One Handicap match.	
27	The Wanderers (Jason Hendrix and Jay Skillet)	September 18, 2011	Live In Mannheim	Mannheim, Germany	1	13		
28	Sumerian Death Squad (Michael Dante and Tommy End)	October 1, 2011	CZW Back In Germany	Oberhausen, Germany	1	316		
29	RockSkillet (Jay Skillet and Jonathan Gresham)	August 12, 2012	Fans Appreciation Weekend 2012 - Day 2	Oberhausen, Germany	1 (2, 1)	203	This was a Two out of Three falls match.	
30	The AUTsiders (Big van Walter and Robert Dreissker)	March 3, 2013	16 Carat Gold 2013 - Day 3	Oberhausen, Germany	1	258		
31	HOT and SPICY (Axel Dieter Jr. and Da Mack)	November 16, 2013	13th Anniversary Tour: Hamburg	Hamburg, Germany	1	119		
32	Matt Striker and Trent?	March 15, 2014	16 Carat Gold 2014 - Day 2	Oberhausen, Germany	1	1		
33	HOT and SPICY (Axel Dieter Jr. and Da Mack)	March 16, 2014	16 Carat Gold 2014 - Day 3	Oberhausen, Germany	2	216		
34	French Flavour (Lucas Di Leo and Peter Fischer)	October 18, 2014	14th Anniversary Tour: SlamMania II	Mannheim, Germany	1	245		
35	Team Prost (Toby Blunt and Mike Schwarz)	June 20, 2015	More Than Wrestling Tour: Finale - Shortcut To The Top	Oberhausen, Germany	1	103	This was a No Disqualification match.	
—	Vacated	October 1, 2015	Westside Xtreme Wrestling Headquarter and wXw-Homepage	Essen, Germany	—	—	Team Prost had given up the wXw World Tag Team Championship voluntary before the wXw World Tag Team Championship	
36	ZackDaddy (Big Daddy Walter and Zack Sabre Jr.)	October 4, 2015	World Tag Team Tournament 2015 - Day 3	Oberhausen, Germany	1 (2, 1)	69	Big Daddy Walter and Zack Sabre Jr. won the Tournament Final for the wXw World Tag Team Championship	
37	Cerberus (Ilja Dragunov and Robert Dreissker)	December 12, 2015	15th Anniversary Show	Oberhausen, Germany	1 (1, 2)	132		
38	Sumerian Death Squad (Michael Dante and Tommy End)	April 22, 2016	Superstars Of Wrestling III - Day 1	Hamburg, Germany	2	43		
39	Cerberus (Dirty Dragan, Ilja Dragunov and Julian Nero)	June 4, 2016	More Than Wrestling Tour 2016: Tourfinal - The Shortcut To The Top	Oberhausen, Germany	1 (1, 2 , 1)	118		
—	Vacated	September 30, 2016	—	—	—	—	Vacated due to Cerberus failing to advance to the finals of the World Tag Team Tournament	
40	JML (David Starr and Shane Strickland)	October 2, 2016	World Tag Team League 2016 - Day 3	Oberhausen, Germany	1	16	Defeated The Leaders Of The New School (Marty Scurll and Zack Sabre Jr.) in a World Tag Team League 2016 Final Match.	
—	Vacated	October 18, 2016	—	—	—	—	Vacated due to Shane Strickland making no further appearances in wXw	
41	A4 (Absolute Andy and Marius Al-Ani)	October 22, 2016	Broken Rules XVI	Frankfurt, Germany	1 (4, 1)	203	Defeated David Starr and Lio Rush for the vacant Championship in a Tables, Ladders, and Chairs match.	
42	The Young Lions (Lucky Kid and Tarkan Aslan)	May 13, 2017	Superstars Of Wrestling 2017	Oberhausen, Germany	1	148		
—	Vacated	October 8, 2017	—	—	—	—	Vacated due to The Young Lions failing to advance to the finals of the World Tag Team League	
43	Ringkampf (Timothy Thatcher and Walter)	October 8, 2017	World Tag Team League 2017 Night 3	Oberhausen, Germany	1 (1, 3)	154	Defeated Massive Product (David Starr and Jurn Simmons) in the finals of the 2017 World Tag Team League for the vacant Championship.	
44	RISE (Da Mack and John Klinger)	March 11, 2018	16 Carat Gold 2018 - Night 3	Oberhausen, Germany	1 (3, 2)	18		
—	Vacated	March 29, 2018	—	—	—	—	The titles were vacated due to John Klinger being indefinitely suspended from future wXw events	
45	Monster Consulting (Avalanche and Julian Nero)	April 14, 2018	True Colors 2018	Dresden, Germany	1 (3, 2)	176	This was a triple threat tag match also involving Jay FK (Francis Kaspin and Jay Skillet) and The Latin American Xchange (Santana and Ortiz). Avalanche formerly known as Robert Dreissker	
—	Vacated	October 7, 2018	—	—	—	—	Vacated due to Monster Consulting failing to advance to the finals of the World Tag Team League.	
46	Jay FK (Francis Kaspin and Jay Skillet)	October 7, 2018	World Tag Team League 2018 - Day 3	Oberhausen, Germany	1 (1, 3)	76	Defeated Calamari Catch Kings (Chris Brookes and Jonathan Gresham) in the finals of the 2018 World Tag Team League.	
47	RISE (Da Mack and Tarkan Aslan)	December 22, 2018	18th Anniversary	Oberhausen, Germany	1 (4, 2)	28	This was a gauntlet match also involving Avalanche and Emil Sitoci, RISE (Ivan Kiev and Pete Bouncer) and The Crown (Alexander James and Jurn Simmons)	
48	RISE (Ivan Kiev and Pete Bouncer)	January 19, 2019	Back To The Roots XVIII	Oberhausen, Germany	1	49	This was a six-man tag team cage match also for the wXw Shotgun Championship. RISE (Ivan Kiev and Pete Bouncer) teamed with Lucky Kid against RISE (Da Mack, Marius Al-Ani and Tarkan Aslan).	
49	Aussie Open (Kyle Fletcher and Mark Davis)	March 9, 2019	16 Carat Gold 2019 - Day 2	Oberhausen, Germany	1	147	This was a tornado triple threat tag match also including Jay FK (Francis Kaspin and Jay Skillet).	
50	Ilja Dragunov and Walter	August 3, 2019	Shortcut to the Top 2019	Oberhausen, Germany	1 (3, 4)	41		
51	Aussie Open (Kyle Fletcher and Mark Davis)	September 13, 2019	FAN 2019 - Du Entscheidest	Hamburg, Germany	2	14		
—	Vacated	September 27, 2019	—	—	—	—	Vacated due to Mark Davis suffering a leg injury	
52	Pretty Bastards (Maggot and Prince Ahura)	October 6, 2019	World Tag Team Festival 2019 - Day 3	Oberhausen, Germany	1	152	Defeated Arrows Of Hungary (Dover and Icarus) and Danny Burch and Oney Lorcan for the vacant titles in a World Tag Team Festival 2019 Final No Disqualification Three Way Elimination match.	
53	Jay-AA (Absolute Andy and Jay Skillet)	March 6, 2020	16 Carat Gold 2020 - Day 1	Oberhausen, Germany	1 (5, 4)	105		
54	Pretty Bastards (Maggot and Prince Ahura)	July 3, 2020	Shotgun	Oberhausen, Germany	2	98	Skillet left the promotion, following allegations of harassment. The title match between Jay-AA and Pretty Bastards had already been filmed, and as a result, he was edited out. The title match only showed Absolute Andy being rolled up for the pin.	
55	Fast Time Moodo and Stephanie Maze	October 9, 2020	Shotgun	Oberhausen, Germany	1	147		
—	Vacated	March 5, 2021	—	—	—	—		
56	Die Wrestling Academy (Anil Marik and Robert Dreissker)	April 9, 2021	Dead End 2021	Oberhausen, Germany	1 (1, 4)	112	Defeated The Pretty Bastards (Maggot and Prince Ahura) in a tournament final to win the vacant titles.	
57	Arrows Of Hungary (Dover and Icarus)	July 30, 2021	Shortcut To The Top 2021	Oberhausen, Germany	1	218		
58	Fast Time Moodo and Stephanie Maze	March 5, 2022	16 Carat Gold 2022	Oberhausen, Germany	2	84		
59	Rott Und Flott (Michael Schenkenberg and Nikita Charisma)	May 28, 2022	wXw True Colors 2022	Dresden, Germany	1	128		
—	Vacated	March 5, 2021	—	—	—	—	Rott Und Flott (Michael Schenkenberg and Nikita Charisma) did not make it to the final of the World Tag Team Festival Tournament which meant they could not defend the titles and needed to vacate them.	
60	Frenchadors (Aigle Blanc and Senza Volto)	October 3, 2022	wXw World Tag Team Festival 2022 - Night 3	Oberhausen, Germany	1	159	Defeated Amboss (Icarus and Robert Dreissker) in a No Disqualification No Count Out Tornado Tag Team Match as a final of a tournament to win the vacant titles.	
61	Arrows Of Hungary (Dover and Icarus)	March 11, 2023	16 Carat Gold 2023 - Night 2	Oberhausen, Germany	2	98		
62	Only Friends (Bobby Gunns and Michael Knight)	June 17, 2023	wXw Drive Of Champions 2023	Oberhausen, Germany	1	98	This was a best two-out-of-three falls match.	
63	Amboss (Laurance Roman and Robert Dreissker)	September 23, 2023	wXw World Tag Team Festival 2023 - Day 2	Oberhausen, Germany	1 (1, 5)	1		
64	Cash & Hektor (Dennis Dullnig and Hektor Invictus)	September 24, 2023	wXw World Tag Team Festival 2023 - Day 3	Oberhausen, Germany	1	48	This was the final match of the 2023 wXw World Tag Team Festival, a four-way tag team match also involving Renegades (Mizuki Watase and Shigehiro Irie).	
65	Amboss (Icarus and Laurance Roman)	November 11, 2023	wXw Broken Rules XXI	Frankfurt, Germany	1 (3, 2)	42	This was a three-way ladder match also involving Peter Tihanyi and Fast Time Moodo.	
66	Cash & Hektor (Dennis Dullnig and Hektor Invictus)	December 23, 2023	wXw 23rd Anniversary	Oberhausen, Germany	2	286		
67	KXS (Axel Tischer and Fast Time Moodo)	October 4, 2024	wXw World Tag Team Festival 2024 - Night 1	Oberhausen, Germany	1 (1, 3)	2	This was a wXw World Tag Team Festival first round match.	
68	Young Blood (Oskar Leube and Yuto Nakashima)	October 6, 2024	wXw World Tag Team Festival 2024 - Night 3	Oberhausen, Germany	1	152	This was a three-way tag team match also involving 1 Called Manders and Thomas Shire for the finals of the wXw World Tag Team Festival 2024.	
69	Big Bucks (Alex Duke, Norman Harras, and Anil Marik)	March 7, 2025	wXw World Tag Team Festival 2025 - Night 1	Oberhausen, Germany	1 (1, 1, 2)	99	This was a four-way tables, ladders, and chairs tag team match also involving High Performer Ltd. (Anil Marik and Icarus) and Planet Gojirah (Marc Empire and Robert Dreissker). On May 3 2025, Anil was recognised as an official champion after Duke suffered a shoulder injury.	
70	Planet Gojirah (Marc Empire and Robert Dreissker)	June 14, 2025	wXw Drive Of Champions 2025	Oberhausen, Germany	1 (1, 6)	155		
71	Greedy Souls (Brendan White and Danny Jones)	November 16, 2025	wXw 25th Anniversary Tour: Leipzig	Leipzig, Germany	1	5		
72	Planet Gojirah (Marc Empire and Robert Dreissker)	November 21, 2025	wXw 25th Anniversary Tour: Hamburg	Hamburg, Germany	2 (2, 7)	22	This was a three-way match also involving The Grind (Laurance Roman and Nick Schreier).	
73	The Grind (Laurance Roman and Nick Schreier)	December 13, 2025	wXw 25th Anniversary	Oberhausen, Germany	1 (3, 1)	84		
74	Planet Gojirah (Marc Empire and Robert Dreissker)	March 7, 2026	16 Carat Gold 2026 - Night 2	Oberhausen, Germany	3 (3, 8)	161	This was a Street fight.	
75	CSI (Luca de Leone and Nordino)	August 15, 2026	wXw Shortcut To The Top 2026	Oberhausen, Germany	1	76+	This was a No Holds Barred.	

== Combined reigns ==
As of October 30, 2026.

=== By team ===
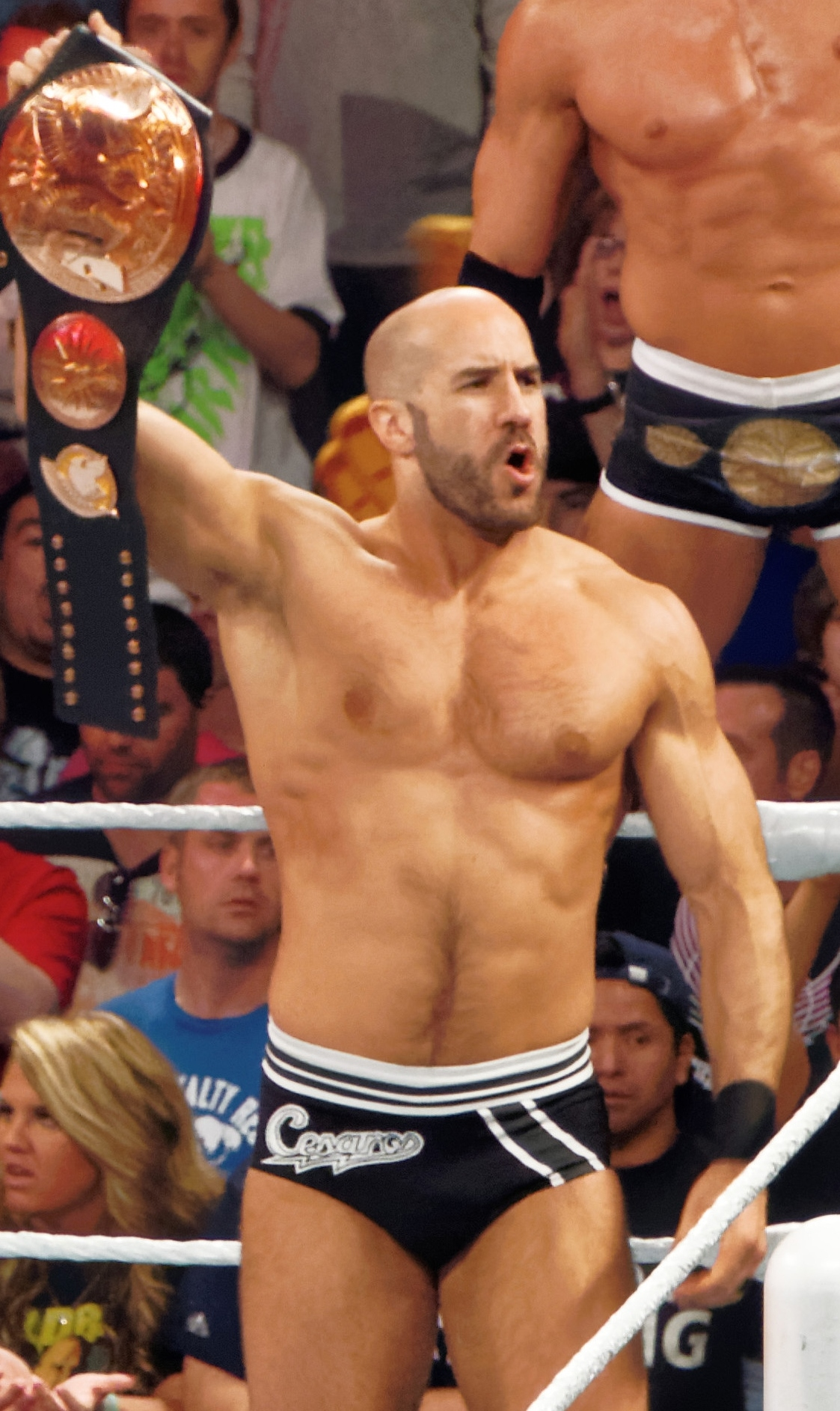
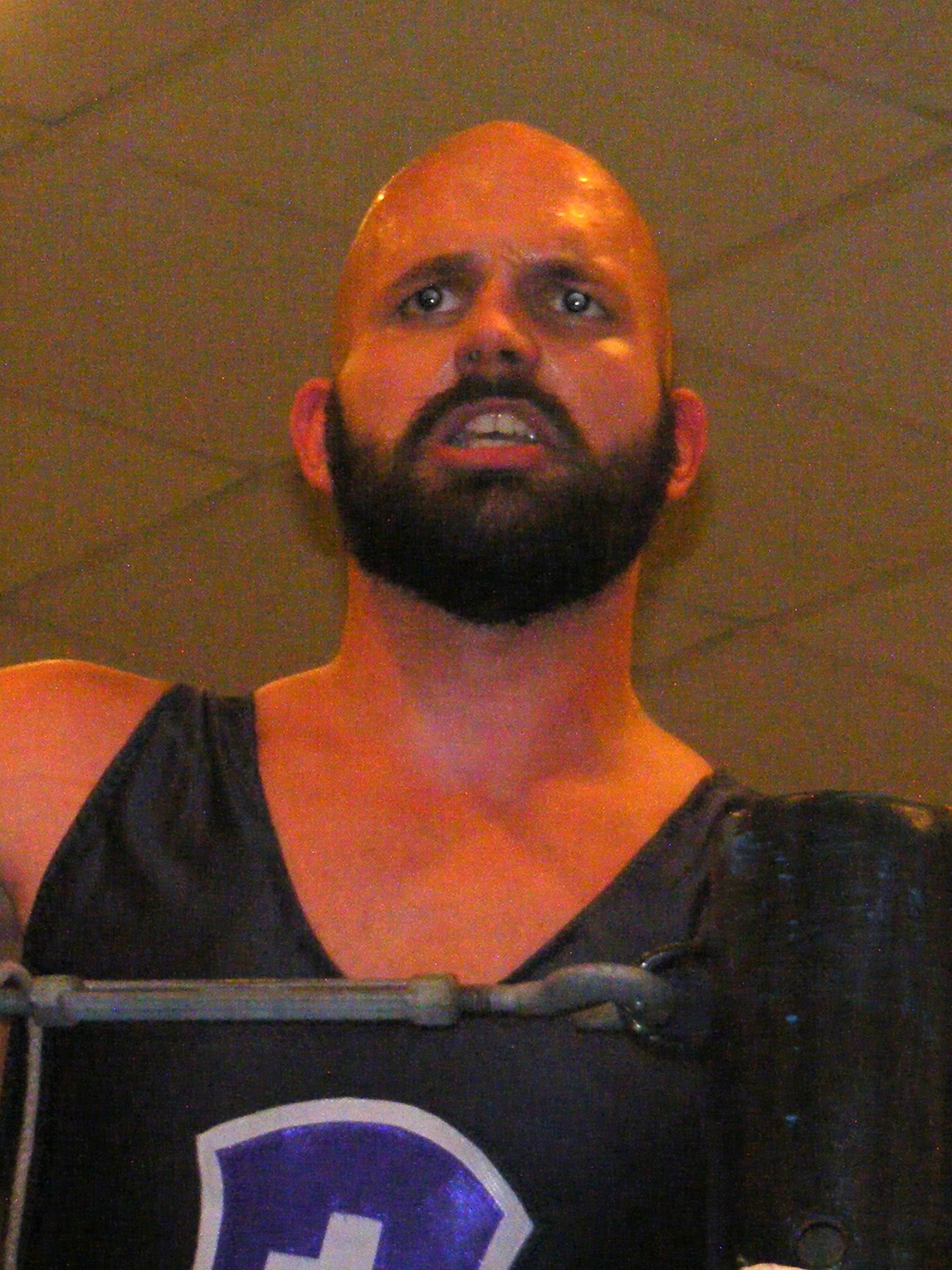
Inaugural and record tying three-time champions as a team, Swi$$ Money Holding: Double C (left) and Ares (right)
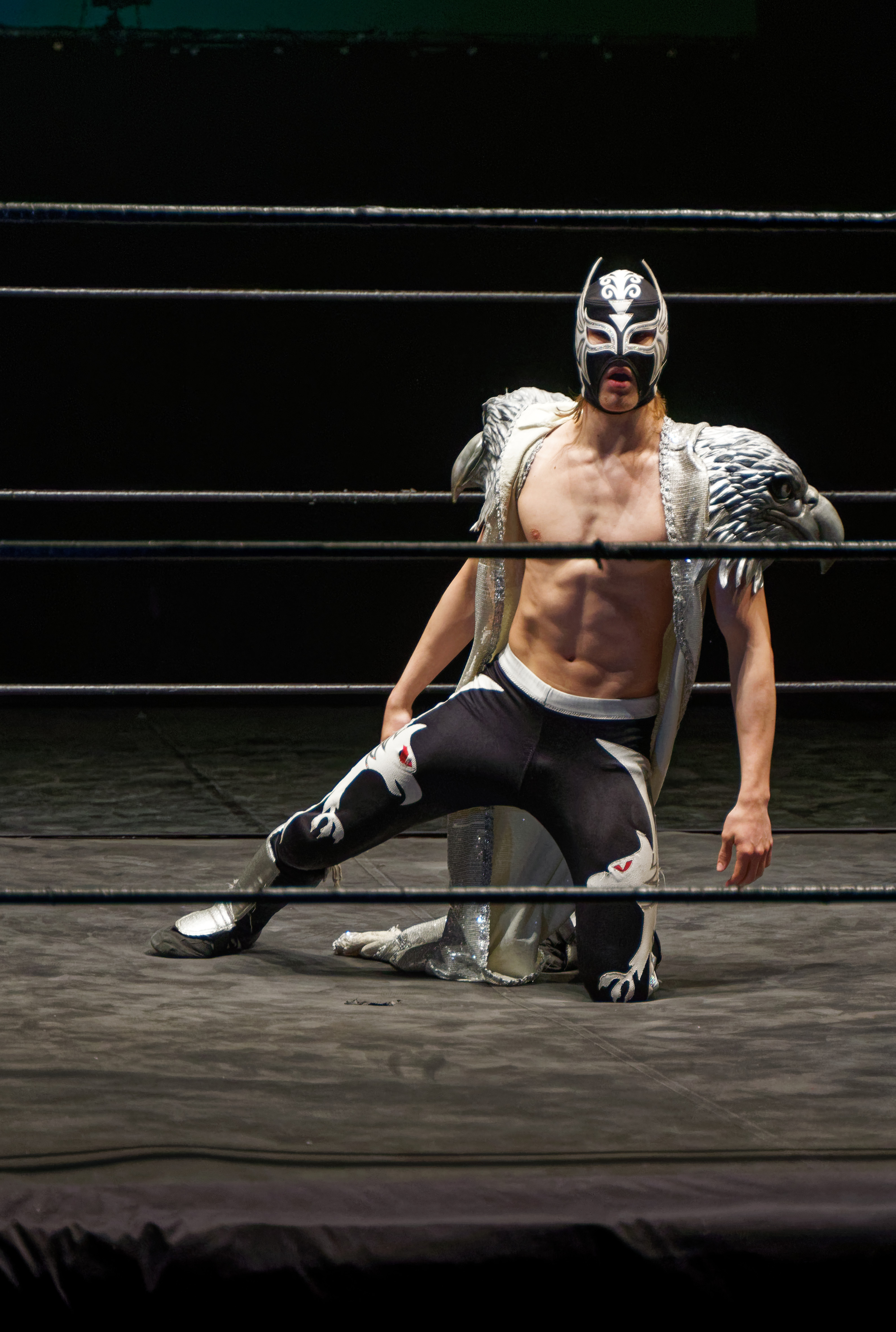
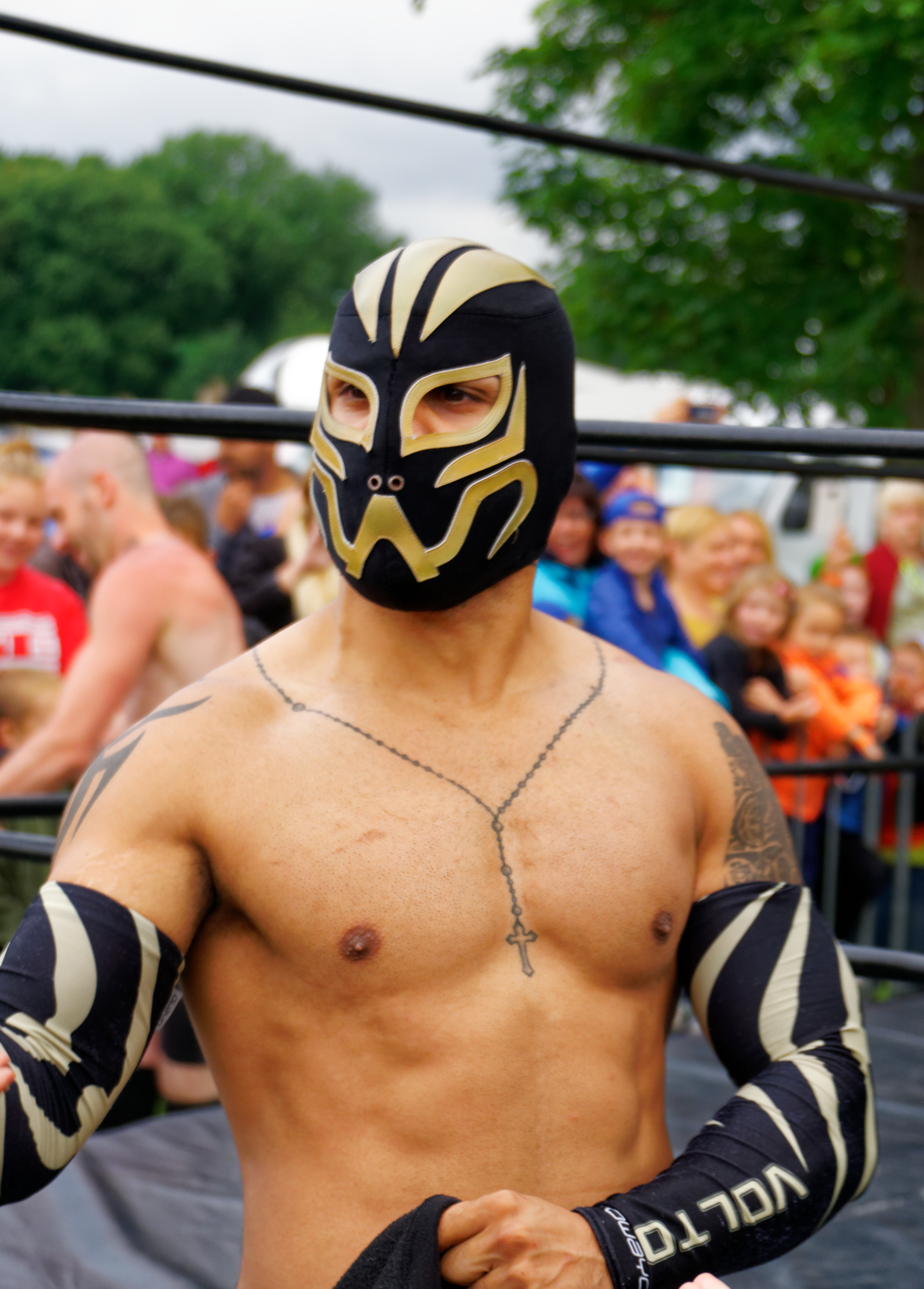
Former champions, Frenchadors (Aigle Blanc (left) and Senza Volto (right)).

†	Indicates the current champion

Rank	Champion	No. of reigns	Combined days
1	Swi$$ Money Holding (Double C and Ares)	3	428
2	Doug Williams and Martin Stone	1	371
3	Sumerian Death Squad (Michael Dante and Tommy End)	2	359
4	Planet Gojirah (Marc Empire and Robert Dreissker)	3	338
5	HOT and SPICY (Axel Dieter Jr. and Da Mack)	2	335
6	Cash & Hektor (Dennis Dullnig and Hektor Invictus)	2	334
7	Arrows Of Hungary (Dover and Icarus)	2	316
8	The Switchblade Conspiracy (Jon Moxley and Sami Callihan)	1	310
9	GTS and Iceman	1	273
10	The New 69ers (Hate and Tyrant)	1	266
11	The AUTsiders (Big van Walter and Robert Dreissker)	1	258
12	Pretty Bastards (Maggot and Prince Ahura)	2	250
13	French Flavour (Lucas Di Leo and Peter Fischer)	1	245
14	AbLas (Absolute Andy and Steve Douglas)	2	237
15	Fast Time Moodo and Stephanie Maze	2	231
15	Murat Bosporus and Wesley Croton	2	231
17	High Class Catch Club (Baron von Hagen and Adam Polak)	2	224
18	Chris Hero and Marc Roudin	1	211
19	A4 (Absolute Andy and Marius Al-Ani)	1	203
19	RockSkillet (Jay Skillet and Jonathan Gresham)	1	203
21	The 69ers (Hate and Martin Nolte)	1	189
21	The Mind (Adam Polak and Karsten Beck)	1	189
23	Oberhausen Terror Corps (Bad Bones and Carnage)	1	183
24	Monster Consulting (Avalanche and Julian Nero)	1	176
25	Aussie Open (Kyle Fletcher and Mark Davis)	2	161
25	Long and Thick (Bas and Mot van Kunder)	1	161
27	Frenchadors (Aigle Blanc and Senza Volto)	1	159
28	Ringkampf (Timothy Thatcher and Walter)	1	154
29	Young Blood (Oskar Leube and Yuto Nakashima)	1	152
30	The Young Lions (Lucky Kid and Tarkan Aslan)	1	148
31	Dark Dream (X-dream and Darksoul)	1	147
32	Cerberus (Ilja Dragunov and Robert Dreissker)	1	132
33	Rott Und Flott (Michael Schenkenberg and Nikita Charisma)	1	128
34	Cerberus (Dirty Dragon, Ilja Dragunov and Julian Nero)	1	118
35	Die Wrestling Academy (Anil Marik and Robert Dreissker)	1	112
36	Jay-AA (Jay Skillet and Absolute Andy)	1	105
37	Team Prost (Toby Blunt and Mike Schwarz)	1	103
38	Big Bucks (Alex Duke and Norman Harras)	1	99
39	Only Friends (Bobby Gunns and Michael Knight)	1	98
40	Next Generation Superstars (Steve Douglas and Alex Pain)	1	84
40	The Grind (Laurance Roman and Nick Schreier)	1	84
42	CSI † (Luca de Leone and Nordino)	1	76+
43	Jay FK (Francis Kaspin and Jay Skillet)	1	76
44	ZackDaddy (Big Daddy Walter and Zack Sabre Jr.)	1	69
45	The Kartel (Sha Samuels and Terry Frazier)	1	63
45	Wrecking Crew (Legendary Thomas Blade and Chris Combat)	1	63
47	Euro Threat (Thomas Blade and SigMasta Rappo)	1	56
48	RISE (Ivan Kiev and Pete Bouncer)	1	49
49	Amboss (Icarus and Laurance Roman)	1	42
49	Euro Threat (Crazy Johnny Tiger and SigMasta Rappo)	1	42
51	Ilja Dragunov and Walter	1	41
52	RISE (Da Mack and Tarkan Aslan)	1	28
53	RISE (John Klinger and Da Mack)	1	18
54	JML (David Starr and Shane Strickland)	1	16
55	The Wanderers (Jason Hendrix and Jay Skillet)	1	13
56	Greedy Souls (Brendan White and Danny Jones)	1	5
57	KXS (Axel Tischer and Fast Time Moodo)	1	2
58	Amboss (Laurance Roman and Robert Dreissker)	1	1
58	Matt Striker and Trent?	1	1
60	Absolute Andy and Josh Abercrombie	1	<1
60	Legendary Thomas Blade and Scorpion	1	<1

=== By wrestler ===
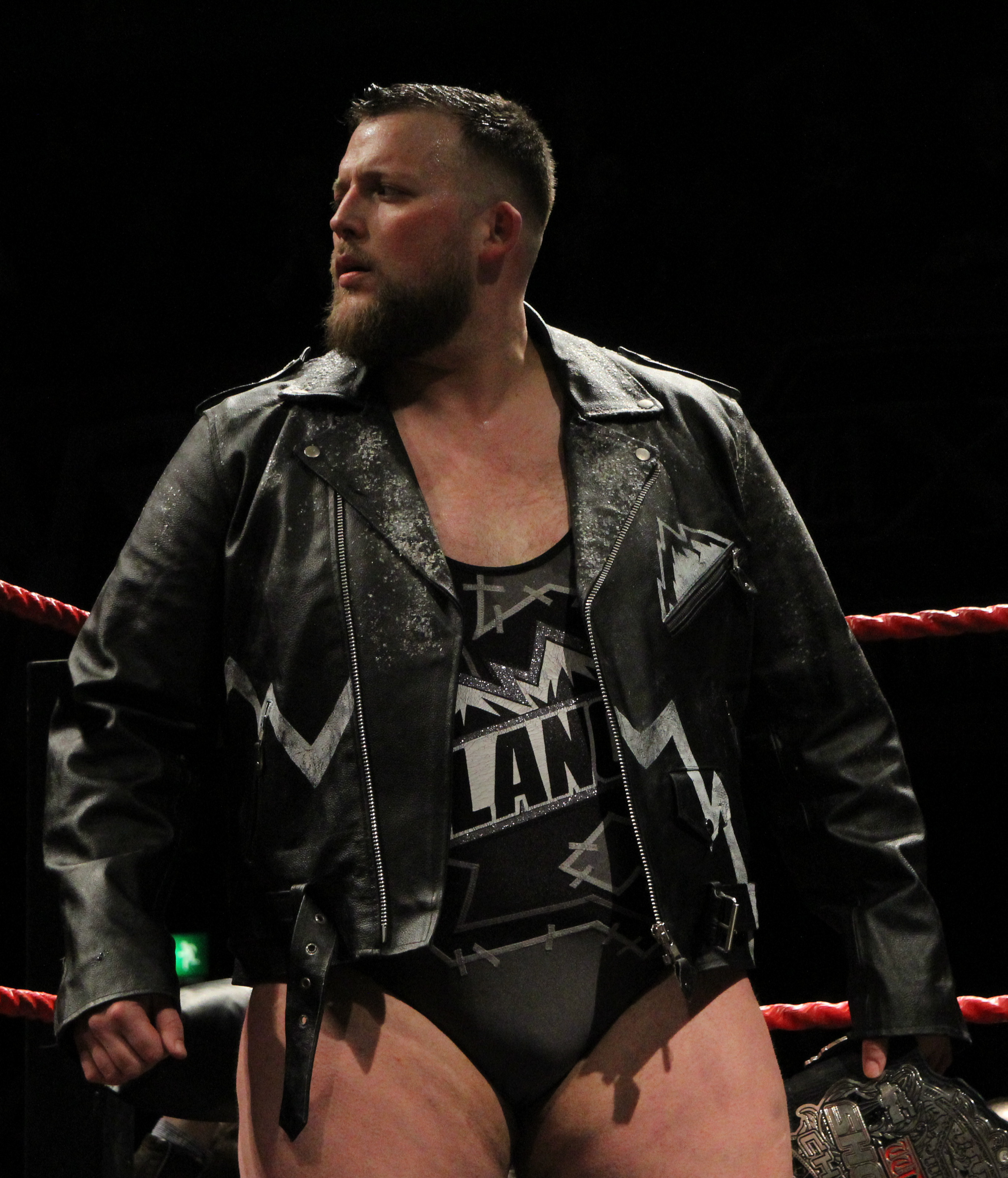
Record eight-time and current champion as individual Robert Dreissker, who held the title for a combined total of 1,015 days which is the longest.

Rank	Champion	No. of reigns	Combined days
1	Avalanche/Robert Dreissker	8	1,015
2	Big van Walter/Big Daddy Walter/Walter	4	522
3	Absolute Andy	5	510
4	Hate	2	455
5	Ares	3	428
5	Claudio Castagnoli	3	428
7	Adam Polak	3	413
8	Da Mack	4	381
9	Doug Williams	1	371
9	Martin Stone	1	371
11	Jay Skillet	4	362
12	Michael Dante	2	359
12	Tommy End	2	359
14	Icarus	3	358
15	Marc Empire	3	338
16	Axel Dieter Jr.	2	335
17	Dennis Dullnig	2	334
17	Hektor Invictus	2	334
19	Steve Douglas	3	321
20	Dover	2	316
21	Jon Moxley	1	310
21	Sami Callihan	1	310
23	Julian Nero	2	294
24	Ilja Dragunov	3	291
25	GTS	1	273
25	Iceman	1	273
27	Tyrant	1	266
28	Maggot	2	250
28	Prince Ahura	2	250
30	Lucas Di Leo	1	245
30	Peter Fischer	1	245
32	Fast Time Moodo	2	233
33	Stephanie Maze	2	231
33	Murat Bosporus	2	231
33	Wesley Croton	2	231
36	Baron von Hagen	2	224
37	Chris Hero	1	211
37	Marc Roudin	1	211
39	Jonathan Gresham	1	203
39	Marius Al-Ani	1	203
41	Bad Bones/John Klinger	2	201
42	Karsten Beck	1	189
42	Martin Nolte	1	189
44	Carnage	1	183
45	Tarkan Aslan	2	176
46	Kyle Fletcher	2	161
46	Mark Davis	2	161
46	Bas van Kunder	1	161
46	Mot van Kunder	1	161
50	Aigle Blanc	1	159
50	Senza Volto	1	159
52	Timothy Thatcher	1	154
52	Anil Marik	2	154
54	Oskar Leube	1	152
54	Yuto Nakashima	1	152
56	Lucky Kid	1	148
57	Darksoul	1	147
57	X-dream	1	147
59	Michael Schenkenberg	1	128
59	Nikita Charisma	1	128
61	Laurance Roman	3	127
62	Legendary Thomas Blade	3	119
63	Dirty Dragan	1	118
64	Mike Schwarz	1	103
64	Toby Blunt	1	103
66	Alex Duke	1	99
66	Norman Harras	1	99
68	SigMasta Rappo	2	98
68	Bobby Gunns	1	98
68	Michael Knight	1	98
71	Alex Pain	1	84
71	Nick Schreier	1	84
73	Luca de Leone †	1	76+
73	Nordino †	1	76+
75	Francis Kaspin	1	76
76	Zack Sabre Jr.	1	69
77	Chris Combat	1	63
77	Sha Samuels	1	63
77	Terry Frazier	1	63
80	Ivan Kiev	1	49
80	Pete Bouncer	1	49
82	Crazy Johnny Tiger	1	42
83	David Starr	1	16
83	Shane Strickland	1	16
85	Jason Hendrix	1	13
86	Brendan White	1	5
86	Danny Jones	1	5
88	Matt Striker	1	1
88	Trent?	1	1
90	Josh Abercrombie	1	<1
90	Scorpion	1	<1

== See also ==
- wXw Unified World Wrestling Championship
- wXw Shotgun Championship
