= Jurn Simmons =

Dutch professional wrestler

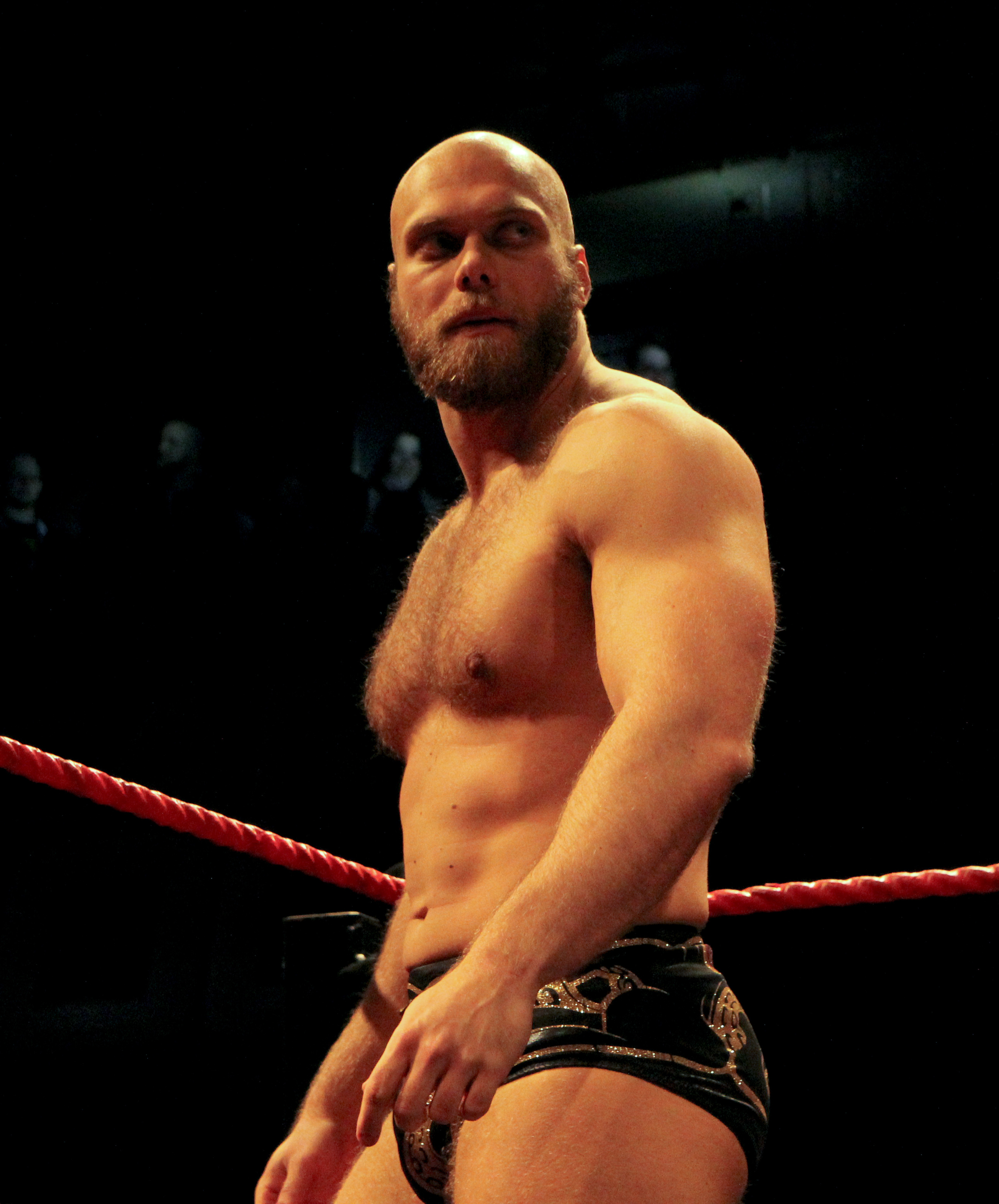
- Simmons at 16 Carat Gold in 2020

Personal information
- Born: Jurn Sijtzema; 29 August 1991 (age 35) Heeg, Súdwest-Fryslân, Netherlands

Professional wrestling career
- Ring name: Jurn Simmons
- Billed height: 6 ft 2 in (1.88 m)
- Billed weight: 253 lb (115 kg)
- Billed from: The Netherlands
- Trained by: Tengkwa; Gabriel Angelfyre
- Debut: 20 April 2013

Jurn Sijtzema (born 29 August 1991), better known by his ring name Jurn Simmons, is a Dutch professional wrestler. He currently working on freelancer, predominantly for Westside Xtreme Wrestling (wXw).

== Professional wrestling career ==
=== Pro Wrestling Holland (2013–present) ===
Simmons trained at Pro Wrestling Holland under the tutelage of Tengkwa and Gabriel Angelfyre, and made his debut for the promotion in April 2013. In the years since, he has held the PWH Heavyweight Championship twice. His first reign began in May 2014, when he defeated Big Geert for the title, and ended in February 2015, where he was defeated by Tengkwa in a four corners match, also involving Richie Julio and Tommy End. His second and current reign began in February 2019, when he defeated Emil Sitoci for the title.

=== Westside Xtreme Wrestling (2014–present) ===
On 2 August 2014, Simmons made his debut for Westside Xtreme Wrestling (wXw), teaming with Johnny Evers, in a defeat to Keel Holding (Michael Isotov and Sasa Keel). He began teaming with Keel Holding members in the following months, and by the end of the year, had joined the stable. In 2015, he continued tagging with his Keel Holding stablemates and regularly teamed with Aaron Insane. They were granted a title shot for the wXw World Tag Team Championship in August, but were defeated by champions Team Prost (Toby Blunt and Mike Schwarz). Later in the year, he allied himself with Karsten Beck, and was part of a stable that included Beck's tag partner Tyler Bate and Reich Und Schön (Kevin Roadster and Marius van Beethoven). As Beck was unable to participate in World Tag Team League, due to his defence of the wXw Unified World Wrestling Championship (initially against Grado, and later replaced by A. C. H.), Simmons took his place. At the tournament, he and Bate defeated Champions of Champions (Absolute Andy and John Klinger) in the first round, but they were defeated by Hot & Spicy (Axel Dieter Jr. and Da Mack) in the quarter-final. After Beck's successful defence of the title, he was upset with the two tag teams not advancing further in the tournament, which led to Bate being literally kicked out from the stable, where Reich Und Schön held him up allowing Simmons to hit a Massive Boot to him. Following this, Simmons began regularly tagging with Beck, and the two would begin feuding with Champions of Champions for the next couple of months. On 12 March 2016, at 16 Carat Gold, a three-way match between Beck and Champions of Champions became a four-way match, and Simmons was put in after Beck had argued that it would be otherwise considered a handicap match. During the match, Simmons rolled Beck up for a near fall, and this saw him ending his alliance with Beck. Towards the end, Klinger speared Andy through a table, taking them both out of the match, and it was down to Simmons and Beck. Simmons kicked out of Beck's piledriver, and hit a Massive Boot on him to win the match and the title. Simmons would continue to be involved in non-title and title matches with Champions of Champions up until Shortcut to the Top. At the event, he participated in the aforementioned match solely to win it, in order to prevent a top contender. However, Beck returned as the surprise 30th entrant, eliminating Simmons, before going on to win the match. The match between the two men never took place, as Beck was diagnosed with a brain tumour, and he had to have surgery to have it removed. Instead, Simmons was used in a storyline with Shotgun Champion Da Mack, where a champion vs. champion match ended in a no contest, due to interference from Axel Dieter Jr. On the Shotgun Live tour, Simmons and Mack had a rematch (this time for the Unified World Wrestling Championship), in which Simmons defeated Mack. On 10 December, at the 16th Anniversary show, Simmons lost the title to Marty Scurll, in a three-way match also involving Adam Cole, ending his reign at 273 days. However, it was Cole who was submitted, as Simmons had been superkicked to the outside. Scurll quickly dropped the title to Dieter that night, which led to Simmons feuding with him and Ringkampf for the next couple of months.

On 14 January 2017, at Back to the Roots, Dieter faced Simmons for the title, and had him in an octopus hold, but was distracted by a video from Scurll, releasing the hold. Simmons went for a drop kick in the corner, which Dieter sidestepped, occurring in a referee bump. When the referee came to, Simmons had Dieter in a torture rack, and although the match was called in Simmons' favour, the result was overturned. Later that month, at London Calling, Simmons defeated Walter to earn another title shot. The title remained with Dieter as he got the better of Scurll in the main event. In February, Simmons briefly teamed with A4 (Absolute Andy and Marius Al-Ani) in six man tag team matches against Dieter, Walter and Timothy Thatcher, before partnering David Starr for the first time at Dead End, where they were defeated by Dieter and Walter. The latter match had an added stipulation, in that had Simmons and Starr won, Karsten Beck would have succeeded Christian Michael Jakobi as the head of wXw's championship board of directors. On March 11, at 16 Carat Gold, Simmons defeated Dieter with a Massive Boot and a piledriver, beginning his second reign with the title. He was also helped by A4 preventing Walter and Thatcher from interfering earlier in the match. The next day, he was involved in a four-way match for Starr's Shotgun Championship, but was unsuccessful in his attempt to become a double champion, as the match was won by Emil Sitoci. Dieter was initially granted a rematch for Simmons' title at True Colors, which was later changed to a four-way match, including Walter and Mike Bailey. At the event, Simmons took advantage of Ringkampf turning on each other, hitting a moonsault on Dieter to retain the title. He then had a short feud with Sitoci, who proclaimed himself to be the best Dutch wrestler alive. He was defeated by Sitoci in a non-title match, dubbed the "champion's challenge", at a show in Frankfurt. As a result, Sitoci was granted a title shot at a show in Hamburg, which saw Simmons retain. On 5 August, at Fight Forever: Da Grosse Tour Opening, Simmons faced Ilja Dragunov and John Klinger in a three-way match. After Dragunov had been taken out by former partner Avalanche, Klinger's Rise stablemates interfered and attacked Simmons, leading to Klinger using his finger to pin him and end his second reign at 147 days. On 1 September, at Fan's Appreciation Night, Klinger defeated Simmons in a rematch for the title. Despite A4 making the save, there was constant interference from Rise, and a belt shot on Simmons allowed Klinger to hit a double-arm DDT on him and win the match. In October, Simmons and Starr, now billed as Massive Product, took part in World Tag Team League. They won all three matches in their block to qualify for the final, which was for the vacant World Tag Team Championship, as previous champions The Young Lions failed to advance to the final. However, in the final, they were defeated by Ringkampf (Timothy Thatcher and Walter), with Starr tapping out to Thatcher. Simmons then started feuding with Alexander James who expressed doubt over the future of Massive Product. James scored wins over Simmons in late October and November: firstly, by pinning him in a three-way match with Starr at a show in Bielefeld, and again, at Broken Rules. Beck refused to give Simmons a rematch, but when James gloated over his win, he accepted an "I Quit" match which was sanctioned by Jakobi. In Hamburg, Simmons defeated James, after taping him to the corner of the ring and attacking him with a Singapore cane. On 23 December, at the 17th Anniversary show, Simmons was defeated by Starr. Post match, the two men shook hands, but Simmons turned on Starr, kicking him in the groin and attacking him with the same cane that he used on James.

As Starr would not be booked until March 2018 for a last man standing match at 16 Carat Gold, Simmons' character began showing more violent tendencies, as well as an overreliance on the Singapore cane. He defeated Dirty Dragan at Back to the Roots and Julian Pace on a Shotgun show, with both matches ending due to referee stoppage. At Dead End, he defeated Mike Schwarz in a hardcore match, making him tap out to a submission hold while the cane was around his neck. At Road to Carat Gold, Simmons confronted Dragan in the ring where he proceeded to berate him. A returning James came out from the back to calm things down, but swerved Dragan and sided with Simmons, before Sitoci made the save. Later in the night, Simmons and James defeated Dragan and Sitoci. After injuring his ankle at a show in Hoyerswerda, Simmons had to withdraw from 16 Carat Gold. On 4 August, he returned at Shortcut to the Top, quickly eliminating three other wrestlers, before being eliminated, alongside Starr, by Dragan and Sitoci. Simmons and Starr would brawl through the crowd, implying that the last man standing match would resume at the next show. On 1 September, at Fan Appreciation Night, the last man standing match between the two men resulted in a double count out. The feud ended the following month at World Tag Team League, where Starr defeated Simmons in a hair vs. hair match. Sitoci and Dragan came out from the back to keep him in the ring and forced him into a chair, while the three men took turns shaving Simmons' head. On night two, Dragan announced his trial series with Sitoci would come to an end and his final match would be against unknown challengers. This was revealed to be Simmons and James, who beat down Sitoci and attacked Dragan with his own belt. On night three, Simmons and James defeated Dragan and Sitoci, ensuring Dragan's departure from the promotion. In a short match, Dragan was almost victorious, after hitting Simmons with a frog splash, but at the last second, James pulled Simmons' foot on the bottom rope, and convinced the referee to restart the match. Simmons quickly hit a Massive Boot on Dragan to win. Billed as The Crown, they rounded off the year in the tag division. On 22 December, at the 18th Anniversary show, they were involved in a gauntlet match for the World Tag Team Championship. They eliminated Monster Consulting with a double-team curb stomp, before being eliminated themselves, when Rise's Pete Bouncer hit a double-arm DDT on Simmons.

== Championships and accomplishments ==
- Premium Championship Wrestling
  - PCW World Championship (1 time, inaugural)
- Pro Wrestling Holland
  - PWH Heavyweight Championship (3 times, current)
- Pro Wrestling Showdown
  - PWS Heavyweight Championship (1 time)
- Westside Xtreme Wrestling
  - wXw Unified World Wrestling Championship (3 times)
  - Shortcut To The Top (2021)
  - Wrestling World Championships Openweight Tournament (2016) (Note: In conjunction with Preston City Wrestling (PCW) and Combat Zone Wrestling (CZW))

== Luchas de Apuestas record ==
Winner (wager)	Loser (wager)	Location	Event	Date	Notes
David Starr (hair)	Jurn Simmons (hair)	Oberhausen, North Rhine-Westphalia, Germany	World Tag Team League – Night 1	October 5, 2018	
