= Robert Dreissker =

Austrian professional wrestler

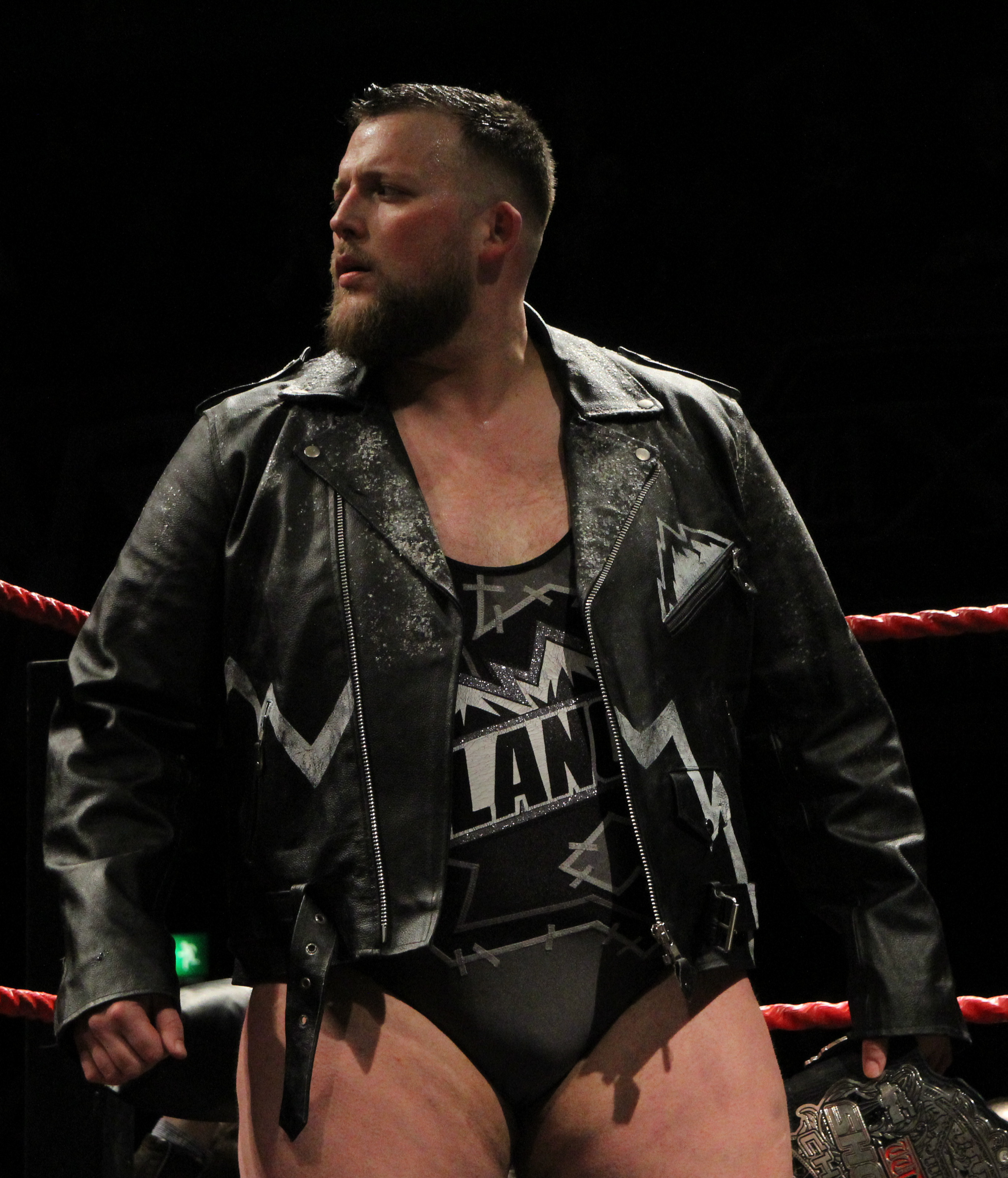
- Dreissker in March 2020 at 16 Carat Gold

Personal information
- Born: 20 May 1989 (age 37) Tulln an der Donau, Austria

Professional wrestling career
- Ring name(s): Dalibor Rheznik; Coach Dreissker; Robert Dreissker; Avalanche
- Billed height: 1.80 m (5 ft 11 in)
- Billed weight: 134 kg (295 lb)
- Trained by: Michael Kovac; Tom Prichard; Walter
- Debut: 2009

Robert Dreissker (born 20 May 1989) is an Austrian professional wrestler, who is currently working for Westside Xtreme Wrestling (wXw). He is also makes appearances for the independent promotions under the ring name Avalanche.

== Professional wrestling career ==
=== Westside Xtreme Wrestling (2009–present) ===
Dreissker made his professional wrestling debut at wXw Full Force IX: Eastern Expedition, an event produced by the German professional wrestling promotion Westside Xtreme Wrestling (wXw) which took place on September 26, 2009, where he suffered a loss against Fritz Keller. On July 28, 2012, he participated at BJW World Triangle Night In Osaka, a three-night cross-over event held between wXw, Combat Zone Wrestling and Big Japan Pro-Wrestling, where he teamed up with Big van Walter to defeat Shinya Ishikawa and Yoshihito Sasaki. He competed in another cross-over of the same kind at BJW World Triangle Night In Korakuen on July 30, 2012, where he teamed up again with Walter to unsuccessfully challenge The Sumerian Death Squad (Michael Dante and Tommy End) for the wXw World Tag Team Championship. Dreissker participated in the wXw 16 Carat Gold 2013 Tournament, where he teamed up with Walter as the AUTsiders on the third night, on March 3, 2013 to defeat RockSkillet (Jay Skillet and Jonathan Gresham) to win the wXw World Tag Team Championship. They defended the titles across events such as wXw Hasta La Victoria Siempre Tour Finale from April 27, 2013, where they defeated The Leaders Of The New School (Marty Scurll and Zack Sabre Jr.) and The Sumerian Death Squad to retain them. On April 9, 2021, he teamed up with Anil Marik as Die Wrestling Academy and defeated The Pretty Bastards (Maggot and Prince Ahura) in a tournament final to win the vacant wXw World Tag Team Championship.

=== Major League Wrestling (2019) ===
In April 2019, he made appearances for Major League Wrestling (MLW), where he unsuccessfully challenged Tom Lawlor for the MLW World Heavyweight Championship on April 5, at MLW Fusion #59. At Battle Riot II on the same night, Dreissker participated in a 39-man battle riot, competing against various wrestlers such as the winner L. A. Park, Konnan, MJF, Low Ki and Brian Pillman Jr. He got eliminated by Ace Romero.

== Championships and accomplishments ==
- Passion Pro
  - Passion Pro Championship (1 time)
- Hungarian Championship Wrestling
  - HCW Tag Team Championship (1 time)– with Laurance Roman, Dovar and Icarus
- Pro Wrestling Österreich
  - PWÖ Openweight Championship (1 time, inaugural)
  - PWÖ Openweight Championship Tournament (2022)
- German Stampede Wrestling
  - GSW Tag Team Championship (1 time) – with Big van Walter
- Pro Wrestling Illustrated
  - Ranked No. 158 of the top 500 singles wrestlers in the PWI 500 in 2024
- Westside Xtreme Wrestling
  - wXw Unified World Wrestling Championship (1 time)
  - wXw Shotgun Championship (2 times)
  - wXw World Tag Team Championship (8 times) – with Big van Walter (1), Ilja Dragunov (1), Julian Nero (1), Anil Marik (1), Laurance Roman (1), Marc Empire (3)
  - Second Triple Crown Champion
  - wXw World Tag Team Championship Tournament (2021) - with Anil Marik
  - International Tag Team Tournament (2018) - with Ilja Dragunov
  - Mitteldeutschland Cup (2015)
  - Road to 16 Carat Gold League (2013)
