= Elijah Blum =

German professional wrestler

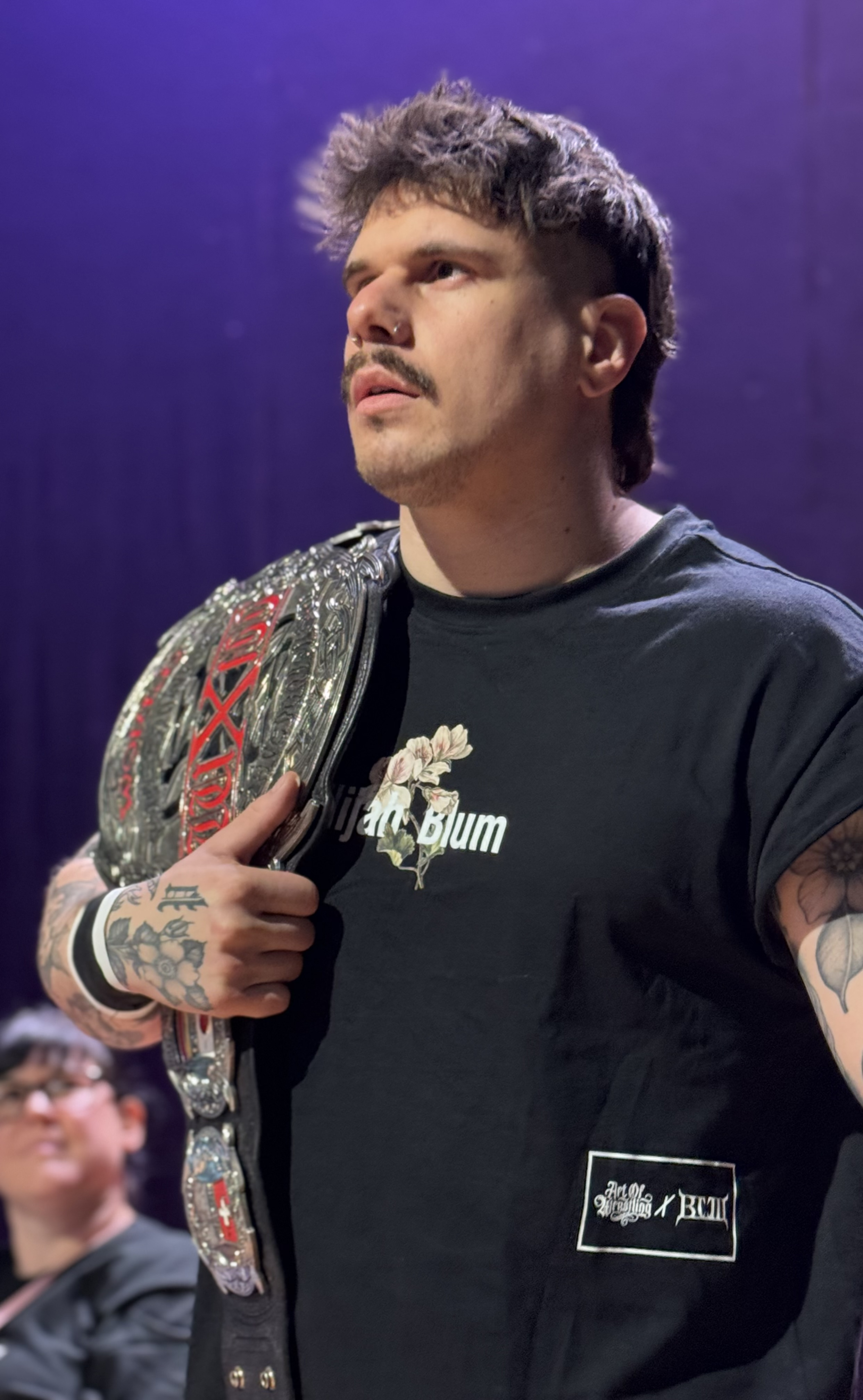
- Blum as the wXw Unified World Wrestling Champion in April 2026

Personal information
- Born: September 16, 1996 (age 30) Datteln, Germany

Professional wrestling career
- Ring name: Elijah Blum
- Billed height: 180 cm (5 ft 11 in)
- Billed weight: 85 kg (187 lb)
- Trained by: Robert Dreissker; The Rotation
- Debut: 2021

Elijah Blum is a German professional wrestler signed to Westside Xtreme Wrestling (wXw), where he is the former one-time wXw Unified World Wrestling Champion. He is also makes appearances on the European independent scene.

== Professional wrestling career ==
=== Westside Xtreme Wrestling (2021–present) ===
Blum started his career in Westside Xtreme Wrestling, as part of the wXw Wrestling Academy of young talent. He made his professional wrestling debut a house show promoted on December 12, 2021, where he defeated Kevin Rogers in singles competition.

Blum began chasing for multiple championships promoted by the company. At wXw We Love Wrestling - Live In Bielefeld on October 21, 2023, Blum defeated Laurance Roman to win the first championship of his career, the wXw Shotgun Championship. At wXw Back To The Roots 2025 on January 18, he started a feud with Peter Tihanyi when he defeated the latter in a Cage Fighting match. The feud was eventually extended to the next year's namesake event from March 24, 2026, when Blum defeated Peter Tihanyi to win the wXw Unified World Wrestling Championship.

Blum competed in various of the promotion's signature events. One of them is the Shortcut To The Top in which he made his first appearance at the 2022 edition where he competed in the traditional battle royal disputed for the number one contendership for the wXw Unified World Wrestling Championship won by Levaniel and also involving various opponents such as Jurn Simmons, Maggot, Teoman and others.

In the 16 Carat Gold Tournament series, he made his first presence in the 2024 edition of the competition, where he fell short to Masato Tanaka in the first rounds. At the 2025 edition, Blum competed outside of the tournament by teaming up with Planet Gojirah (Marc Empire and Robert Dreissker) to defeat Astronauts (Fuminori Abe and Takuya Nomura) and Daisuke Sekimoto. In the wXw World Tag Team Festival, Blum made his first appearance at the 2024 edition, where he teamed up with LSG, falling short to Young Blood (Oskar Leube and Yuto Nakashima) in the first rounds. In the wXw Catch Grand Prix tournament, Blum made his first appearance at the 2025 edition, where he topped the Block A of the competition by defeating Marius Al-Ani, Bobby Gunns and LaBron Kozone, only to fall short to Ahura in the finals.

=== European independent circuit (2022–present) ===
Blum made his debut in Progress Wrestling's Super Strong Style 16 during the 2026 edition where he defeated Bobby Gunns in the first rounds.

== Championships and accomplishments ==
- Central Wrestling Germany
  - CWG Championship (1 time, current)
- Fightback Wrestling
  - Fightback Championship (1 time)
- Pro Wrestling Illustrated
  - Ranked No. 113 of the top 500 singles wrestlers in the PWI 500 in 2026
- Westside Xtreme Wrestling
  - wXw Unified World Wrestling Championship (1 time)
  - wXw Shotgun Championship (1 time)
