= Ahura (wrestler) =

German professional wrestler

Personal information
- Born: July 28, 1994 (age 32) Frankfurt, Germany

Professional wrestling career
- Ring name: Prince Ahura King Ahura Ahura Kidd Ahura
- Billed height: 185 cm (6 ft 1 in)
- Billed weight: 85 kg (187 lb)
- Trained by: GHW Wrestling Factory; Jay Skillet; Walter
- Debut: 2016

Aman Khederzadeh, better known by his ring name Ahura, is a German professional wrestler. He performs on the independent circuit – predominantly for Westside Xtreme Wrestling (wXw), where is current wXw Unified World Wrestling Champion in his first reign and the German Wrestling Federation (GWF), where he is the former one-time GWF World Champion.

== Professional wrestling career ==
=== European independent circuit (2016–present) ===
Khederzadeh made his professional wrestling debut at GHW Hurricane Havoc, an event promoted by German Hurricane Wrestling on February 20, 2016, where he fell short to Misfit in singles competition. He is known for his tenures with various promotions from the European independent scene such as German Wrestling Federation (GWF) and Championship of Wrestling (cOw).

=== Westside Xtreme Wrestling (2016–present) ===
Khederzadeh is best known for his tenure with the German professional wrestling promotion Westside Xtreme Wrestling. During his first years, he competed in the "wXw Academy", having made his debut at Scouting The Next Generation 5 on April 30, 2016, under the name of "Ahura Kidd" where he teamed up with Nate Devlin in a losing effort against Mike Schwarz and Thunderhawk.

He began chasing for multiple championships promoted by the company. In 2019, he teamed up with his "Pretty Bastards" tag team partner Maggot and won the wXw World Tag Team Festival by defeating Jay-AA (Absolute Andy and Jay Skillet) in the first rounds, David Starr and Norman Harras in the semifinals, and Arrows Of Hungary (Dover and Icarus) and Danny Burch and Oney Lorcan in a three-way final match which was also contested for the vacant wXw World Tag Team Championship. At Drive Of Champions 2021 on May 28, Khederzadeh defeated Norman Harras to win the wXw Shotgun Championship.

Khederzadeh competed in various of the promotion's signature events. One of them is the Shortcut To The Top in which he made his first appearance at the 2018 edition where he competed in the traditional battle royal disputed for the number one contendership for the wXw Unified World Wrestling Championship won by Bobby Gunns and also involving various opponents such as Alpha Female, Doug Williams, Jurn Simmons, Oliver Carter, The Rotation, Timothy Thatcher and others.

In the 16 Carat Gold Tournament series, he made his first presence in the 2023 edition of the competition, where he defeated Maggot in the first rounds, Komander in the second, then fell short to Shigehiro Irie in the semifinals. He scored his best result at the 2026 edition which he won by defeating Dennis Dullnig in the first rounds, Tetsuya Naito in the second, Thomas Shire in the semifinals, and Peter Tihanyi in the finals. He won the 2025 edition of the wXw Catch Grand Prix, in which he placed himself in the B block which he topped with four points after competing against Adam Priest, Joseph Fenech Jr. and Hektor Invictus, then defeated Elijah Blum in the finals.

== Championships and accomplishments ==
- Fightback Wrestling
  - Fightback Tag Team Championship (1 time) – with Ronaldo Shaqiri
- German Hurricane Wrestling
  - GHW Tag Team Championship (1 time) – with Maggot
- German Wrestling Federation
  - GWF Berlin Championship (1 time)
  - GWF World Championship (1 time)
  - GWF World Cup (2024)
- Pro Wrestling Illustrated
  - Ranked No. 119 of the top 500 singles wrestlers in the PWI 500 in 2026
- Westside Xtreme Wrestling
  - wXw Unified World Wrestling Championship (1 time, current)
  - wXw Shotgun Championship (1 time)
  - wXw World Tag Team Championship (2 times) – with Maggot
  - wXw World Tag Team Festival (2019)
  - 16 Carat Gold Tournament (2026)
  - wXw Catch Grand Prix (2025)
  - Eighth Triple Crown Champion
