= Maggot (wrestler) =

German professional wrestler

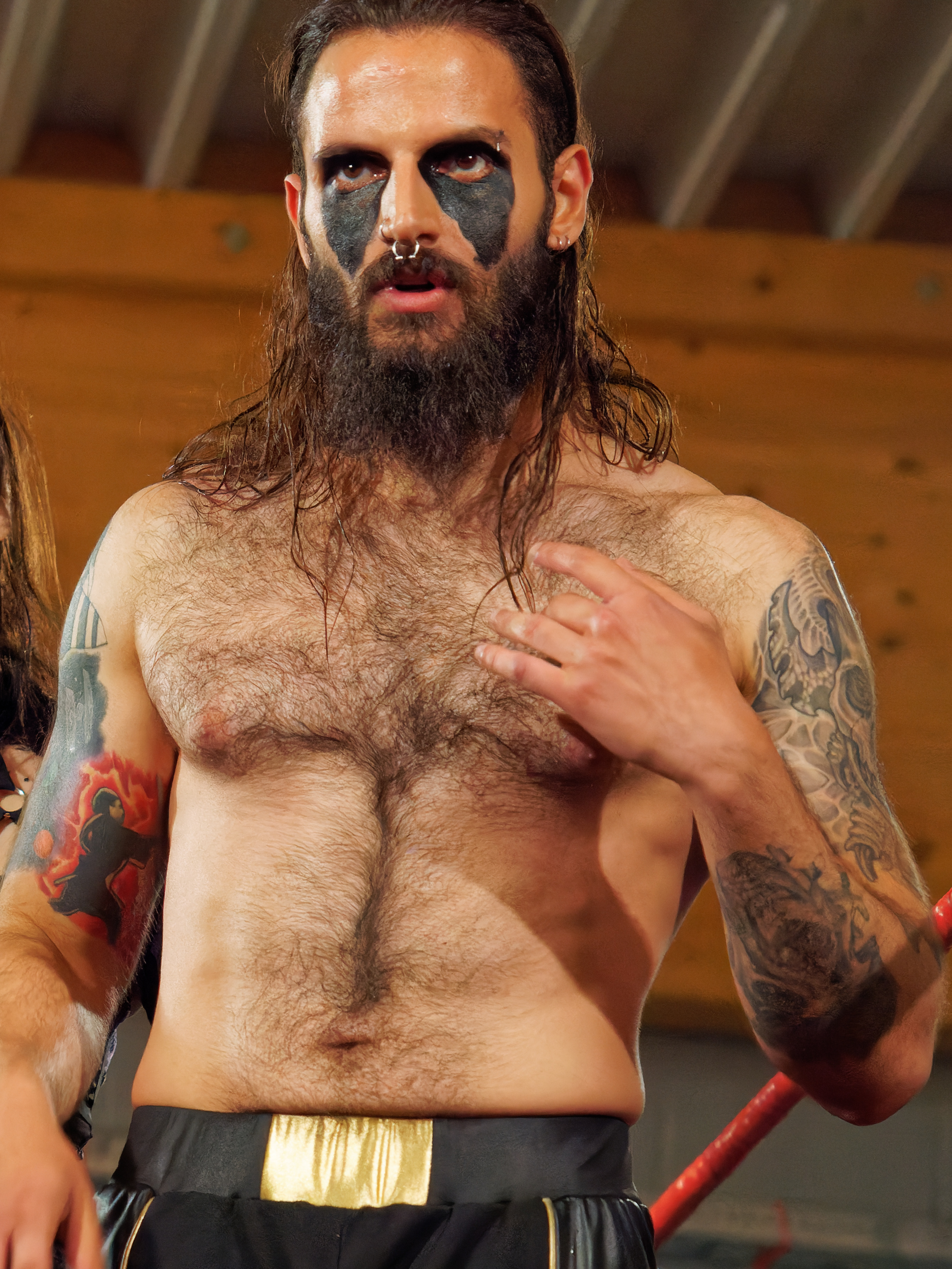
- Maggot in June 2022

Personal information
- Born: September 28 Frankfurt, Germany

Professional wrestling career
- Ring name: Maggot
- Billed height: 173 cm (5 ft 8 in)
- Billed weight: 73 kg (161 lb)
- Trained by: Aaron Insane
- Debut: 2014

Amir Wittkamp better known by his ring name Maggot is a German professional wrestler currently working as a freelancer, predominantly for Westside Xtreme Wrestling (wXw) where he is a wXw World Tag Team and wXw Shotgun Champion. He also performs on the European independent scene.

== Professional wrestling career ==
=== Independent circuit (2014–present) ===
Wittkamp made his professional wrestling debut at CWE Point Of No Return, an event promoted by Classic Wrestling Entertainment on January 18, 2014, where he fell short to Drake Destroyer in singles competition. He is known for his tenures with various promotions from the German independent scene with which he has shared brief or longer stints such as German Hurricane Wrestling, Fightback Wrestling, New Generation Wrestling, German Wrestling Federation and others. At GCW Vs. The World 2023, an event promoted by the American promotion Game Changer Wrestling on September 23, 2023, he teamed up with Baby Allison in a losing effort against BUSSY (Allie Katch and Effy).

=== Progress Wrestling (2022–2023) ===
Wittkamp shared a stint tenure with Progress Wrestling. He made his debut in the promotion at the 2022 edition of the Super Strong Style 16 tournament which was also disputed for the vacant PROGRESS World Championship where he fell short to Kid Lykos in the first rounds. He also competed in the 2023 edition where he fell short to Nathan Cruz in the first rounds. At PROGRESS Chapter 145: Wrestling Witch Face - Trick Or Treat on October 23, 2022, he successfully defended the wXw Shotgun Championship against Man Like DeReiss. At PROGRESS Chapter 149: Establish Your Love on February 12, 2023, he defeated Tate Mayfairs, Tu Byt and Warhorse in a four-way match. He wrestled his last match for the promotion on the second night of the 2023 Super String Style 16 tournament where he competed in a Simon Miller's Ups and Downs Battle Royal won by Rampage Brown and also involving Tate Mayfairs, Charles Crowley, Bullit, Big Damo, Robbie X, Man Like DeReiss, Leon Slater, Shigehiro Irie and Nick Wayne.

=== Westside Xtreme Wrestling (2015–present) ===
Wittkamp started competing for Westside Xtreme Wrestling in the wXw Academy branch. He made his debut at wXw Academy Scouting The Next Generation 2 on December 19, 2015, where he defeated Mo Jnibi in the semifinals of a tournament to crown the inaugural wXw Academy Champion. On the same night, he fell short to Johnny Evers, Dirty Dragan and Francis Kaspin in the final four-way match for the championship itself won by Evers.

He began chasing for multiple accomplishments put up for grabs by the company. He competed alongside his "Pretty Bastards" tag team partner Prince Ahura into the 2019 edition of the World Tag Team Festival where they outmatched Jay-AA (Absolute Andy and Jay Skillet) in the first rounds, David Starr and Norman Harras in the semifinals and Arrows Of Hungary (Dover and Icarus) and Danny Burch and Oney Lorcan in a three-way match from the finals which was also disputed for the vacant wXw World Tag Team Championship. Wittkamp won the tag team titles on one more occasion alongside Ahura at wXw Shotgun, a house show promoted on October 9, 2020, by defeating Jay-AA (Absolute Andy and Jay Skillet). He won the wXw Shotgun Championship on the second night of the 2022 edition of the 16 Carat Gold Tournament by defeating Ninja Mack.

Wittkamp competed in various of the promotion's signature events. One of them is the Shortcut To The Top in which he made his first appearance at the 2019 edition where he competed in the traditional battle royal disputed for the number one contendership for the wXw Unified World Wrestling Championship won by Timothy Thatcher and also involving other notable opponents such as Chris Brookes, El Lindaman, Ilja Dragunov, Kyle Fletcher, Marius Al-Ani, Mark Davis, Oliver Carter, Sha Samuels, Shigehiro Irie, T-Hawk, The Rotation, Walter and many others. Onr year later at the 2020 edition, he competed in the same battle royal, this time won by Mike Schwarz and also involving both male and female opponents like Emil Sitoci, Hektor Invictus, Jurn Simmons, Killer Kelly or Stephanie Maze. He returned to the event two years later at the 2022 edition where he again competed in the traditional battle royal won by Levaniel and also involving the likes of Aigle Blanc, Senza Volto, Laurance Roman, Axel Tischer, Bobby Gunns, Teoman and others. He succeeded in winning the battle royal of the 2023 edition by outlasting other 29 competitors including Michael Oku, Tristan Archer, Michael Schenkenberg, Aliss Ink, Peter Tihanyi and others.

In WXw Catch Grand Prix, Wittkamp made his first appearance at the 2021 edition where he defeated Robert Dreissker in the first rounds but fell short to Bobby Gunns in the second ones. In the 16 Carat Gold Tournament, he made his debut at the 2022 edition where he defeated Ace Romero in the first rounds but got eliminated by LuFisto in the quarterfinals. At the 2023 edition, he fell short to his tag team partner Ahura.

== Championships and accomplishments ==
- Aurora Pro Wrestling
  - Aurora Championship (1 time, inaugural)
  - Aurora Title Tournament (2024)
- Championship of Wrestling
  - cOw Heavyweight Championship (1 time, current)
- Fightback Wrestling
  - Fightback Ultimate Collector Championship (1 time)
  - Fightback Tag Team Championship (1 time, current) – with Baby Allison
- German Hurricane Wrestling
  - GHW Tag Team Championship (2 times) – with Prince Ahura (1) and Bernd Föhr (1)
- New Generation Wrestling
  - nGw Championship (2 times)
- WrestlingKULT
  - WrestlingKULT No Limits Championship (1 time, current)
- Legion Wrestling
  - Legion Championship (1 time, current)
- Pro Wrestling Illustrated
  - Ranked No. 419 of the top 500 singles wrestlers in the PWI 500 of 2022
- Westside Xtreme Wrestling
  - wXw Shotgun Championship (1 time)
  - wXw World Tag Team Championship (2 times) – with Prince Ahura
  - WXw World Tag Team Festival (2019) – with Prince Ahura
  - Shortcut To The Top (2023)
