= Hektor Invictus =

German professional wrestler

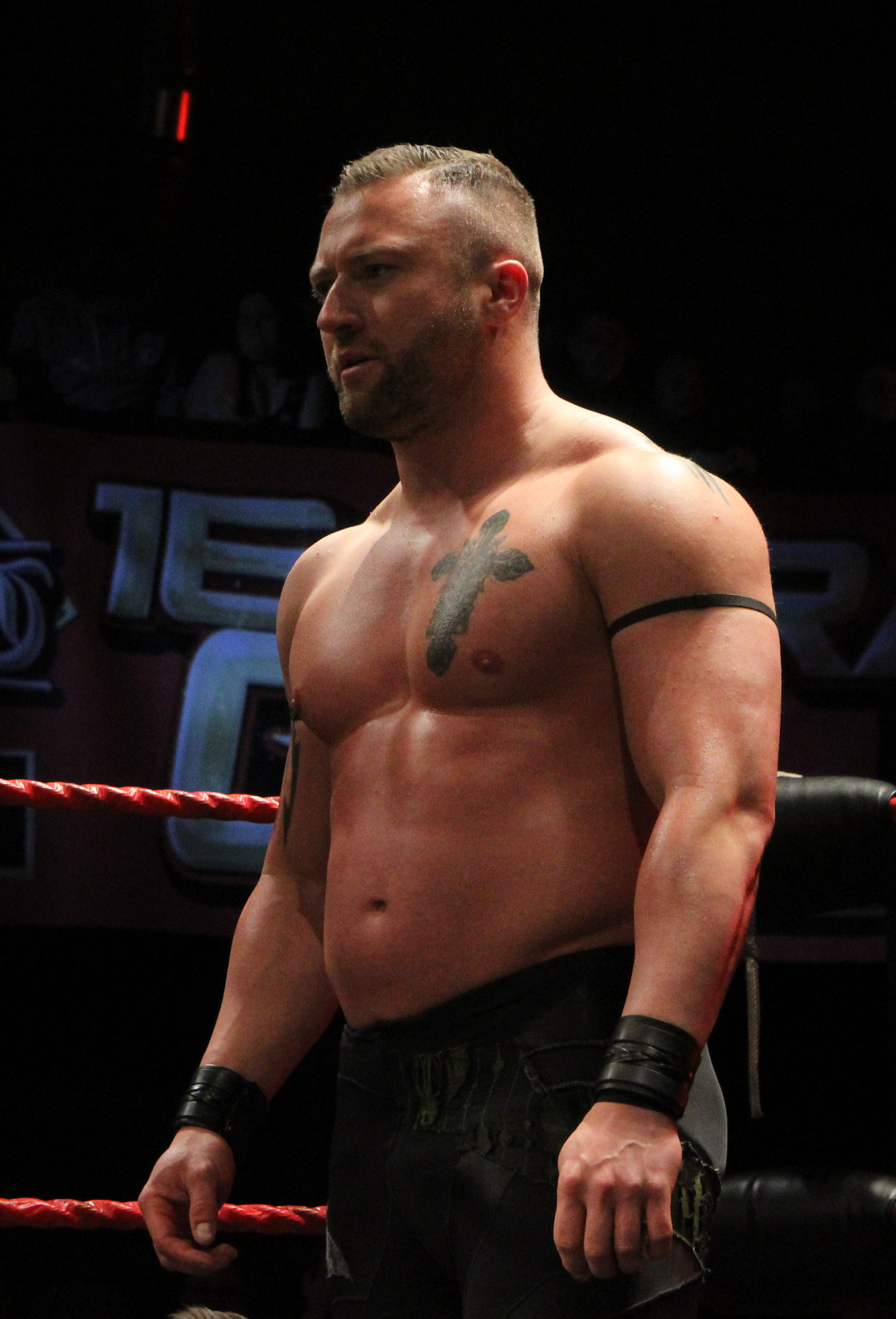
- Invictus in March 2020

Personal information
- Born: April 6, 1990 (age 36) Nürnberg, West Germany

Professional wrestling career
- Ring name(s): Chris Legend; Hektor Invictus; Hektor; T-K-O
- Billed height: 177 cm (5 ft 10 in)
- Billed weight: 98 kg (216 lb)
- Trained by: Alex Wright
- Debut: 2011

Christian Tscherpel better known by his ring name Hektor Invictus is a German professional wrestler currently working as a freelancer and is best known for his time in Westside Xtreme Wrestling (wXw) where he is a former wXw World Tag Team Champion and wXw Shotgun Champion. He is also known for his various tenures with promotions from the European independent scene.

== Professional wrestling career ==
=== Independent circuit (2011–present) ===
Tscherpel is known for various tenures with multiple promotions of the European independent scene. He made his professional wrestling debut at SCW Halloween Brawl, a house show promoted by Swiss Championship Wrestling on October 29, 2011, where he competed under the ring name of Chris Legend and teamed up with Steve Atlas in a losing effort against Maximilian Bismarck and Miguel Ramirez. He shared tenures with promotions from countries like Germany, Italy, United Kingdom and Switzerland such as Ultimate Kombat Wrestling Association, New European Championship Wrestling, Frontier Championship Wrestling, All Star Wrestling, Rings of Europe and many more.

=== Westside Xtreme Wrestling (2017–present) ===
Tscherpel made his debut in Westside Xtreme Wrestling under the ring name of T-K-O at wXw Fight Forever Tour: Gotha on November 17, 2017, where he fell short to Alexander James in singles competition.

He began chasing for multiple championships promoted by the company. At wXw 20th Anniversary on August 7, 2021, he defeated Prince Ahura by disqualification in a match contested for the wXw Shotgun Championship without winning the title. On the finals of the 2023 edition of the wXw World Tag Team Festival from September 24, he alongside Dennis Dullnig won both the wXw World Tag Team Championship and the tournament by defeating Amboss (Laurance Roman and Robert Dreissker) and Renegades (Mizuki Watase and Shigehiro Irie) in a three-way tag team match. Tscherpel held the tag team titles with Dullnig on one more occasion, winning the titles at wXw 23rd Anniversary on December 23, 2023, by defeating Amboss (Icarus and Laurance Roman).

Tscherpel competed in various of the promotion's signature events. One of them is the Shortcut To The Top in which he made his first appearance at the 2020 edition where he competed in the traditional battle royal disputed for the number one contendership for the wXw Unified World Wrestling Championship won by Mike Schwarz and also involving various notable opponents, both male and female, such as Absolute Andy, Emil Sitoci, Jurn Simmons, Killer Kelly, Norman Harras, The Rotation, Maggot and many others. He returned to the event two years later at the 2022 edition where he competed in the same battle royal, this time won by Levaniel and also involving Aigle Blanc, Axel Tischer, Bobby Gunns, Senza Volto, Teoman, Peter Tihanyi, Vincent Heisenberg and many others. At the 2023 edition, he competed in the battle royal won by Maggot which also involved the likes of Michael Oku, Tristan Archer, Michael Schenkenberg, Aliss Ink and others.

In the WXw Catch Grand Prix, Tscherpel made his first appearance at the 2020 edition where he placed himself in the Block A of the competition, scoring a total of three points after going against Cara Noir, Metehan, Bobby Gunns, Avalanche, Fast Time Moodo and Anil Marik. In the 16 Carat Gold Tournament, he made his debut at the 2022 edition where he replaced an injured Marius Al-Ani in the quarterfinals where he fell short to Shigehiro Irie.

== Championships and accomplishments ==
- Championship Of Wrestling
  - cOw/WPWI United Championship (4 times)
- German Wrestling Promotion
  - GWP World Championship (1 time)
- Independent Pro Wrestling Germany
  - IPW Heavyweight Championship (1 time)
  - IPW Germany Tag Team championship (1 time) – with Marius Al-Ani
- Independent Wrestling Innovation
  - IWI World Championship (2 times)
  - IWI Tag Team Championship (1 time) – with Marius Al-Ani
- New European Championship Wrestling
  - NEW World Heavyweight Championship (3 times)
  - NEW World Internet Championship (1 time)
  - NEW World Tag Team Championship (2 times) – with Juvenile X (1) and Juvenile X and Fast Time Moodo (1)
- Power Of Wrestling
  - POW Junior Championship (1 time)
  - POW Intercontinental Championship (1 time)
- Pro Wrestling Illustrated
  - Ranked No. 357 of the top singles wrestlers in the PWI 500 in 2026
- Ultimate Kombat Wrestling Association
  - UKWA Steiermark Championship (1 time)
  - UKWA Tag Team Championship (2 times) – with Juvenile X (1) and Graf Maximilian von Bismarck (1)
- Westside Xtreme Wrestling
  - wXw Shotgun Championship (1 time)
  - wXw World Tag Team Championship (2 times) – with Dennis Dullnig
  - wXw World Tag Team Festival (2023) – with Dennis Dullnig
