= WXw Catch Grand Prix =

Catch Grand Prix is an annual professional wrestling tournament produced by Westside Xtreme Wrestling (wXw) in 2020 and 2021, where professional wrestlers compete in catch wrestling style matches and the winner receives a title shot for the wXw Unified World Wrestling Championship.

== List of winners ==
#	Year	Winner	Times won	Finals date	Runner-up	Finals location	Venue	Ref.
1	2020	Marius Al-Ani	1	December 13, 2020	Cara Noir	Oberhausen, Germany	Steffy's Nightclub	
2	2021	Axel Tischer	1	September 25, 2021	Bobby Gunns	Oberhausen, Germany	Luise-Albertz-Halle Oberhausen	
3	2025	Ahura	1	September 28, 2025	Elijah Blum	Oberhausen, Germany	Turbinenhalle Oberhausen	
4	2026	Dennis Dullnig	1	September 27, 2026	Elijah Blum	Oberhausen, Germany	Turbinenhalle Oberhausen	

=== Championship match for winner ===
– Championship victory
– Championship match loss

#	Winner	Event	Year	Championship match	Ref.
1	Marius Al-Ani	Dead End	2021	Al-Ani defeated Bobby Gunns to win the wXw Unified World Wrestling Championship.	
2	Axel Tischer	True Colors	2021	Tischer defeated Marius Al-Ani to win the wXw Unified World Wrestling Championship.	

== Tournament history ==
=== 2020 ===
The first Catch Grand Prix was a round robin tournament which took place between October 26, 2020 and December 13, 2020. The tournament consisted of two blocks and fourteen participants. Each block consisted of seven participants and the winners of both blocks competed in the final. Wrestlers received 2 points on winning a match and 1 point on a draw. Cara Noir and Metehan topped the Block A with nine points each but Noir advanced due to tie-breaker as he had beaten Metehan earlier in their tournament match. Marius Al-Ani topped Block B with fourteen points. Al-Ani and Noir competed in the tournament final, which Al-Ani won.

Final standings
Block A		Block B	
Cara Noir	9	Marius Al-Ani	12
Metehan	9	Tristan Archer	8
Bobby Gunns	8	Senza Volto	8
Avalanche	8	Emil Sitoci	4
Fast Time Moodo	4	Prince Ahura	4
Hektor Invictus	3	Norman Harras	4
Anil Marik	1	Vincent Heisenberg	2

Block A	Noir	Metehan	Gunns	Avalanche	Moodo	Invictus	Marik
Noir	—N/a	Noir (12:38)	Draw (15:00)	Avalanche (9:26)	Noir (6:58)	Noir (6:39)	Noir (6:23)
Metehan	Noir (12:38)	—N/a	DDQ (1:31)	Metehan (8:23)	Metehan (8:44)	Metehan (3:50)	Metehan (6:52)
Gunns	Draw (15:00)	DDQ (1:31)	—N/a	Avalanche (11:17)	Gunns (10:22)	Gunns (7:23)	Gunns (5:04)
Avalanche	Avalanche (9:26)	Metehan (8:23)	Avalanche (11:17)	—N/a	Avalanche (9:58)	Draw (15:00)	Draw (15:00)
Moodo	Noir (6:58)	Metehan (8:44)	Gunns (10:22)	Avalanche (9:58)	—N/a	Moodo (4:21)	Moodo (0:17)
Invictus	Noir (6:39)	Metehan (3:50)	Gunns (7:23)	Draw (15:00)	Moodo (4:21)	—N/a	Invictus (7:24)
Marik	Noir (6:23)	Metehan (6:52)	Gunns (5:04)	Draw (15:00)	Moodo (0:17)	Invictus (7:24)	—N/a
Block B	Al-Ani	Archer	Volto	Sitoci	Ahura	Harras	Heisenberg
Al-Ani	—N/a	Al-Ani (9:57)	Al-Ani (4:16)	Al-Ani (9:54)	Al-Ani (9:36)	Al-Ani (4:13)	Al-Ani (4:51)
Archer	Al-Ani (9:57)	—N/a	Archer (8:43)	Archer (10:59)	Archer (11:24)	Archer (8:02)	Heisenberg (7:09)
Volto	Al-Ani (4:16)	Archer (8:43)	—N/a	Volto (8:47)	Volto (10:44)	Volto (7:28)	Volto (8:16)
Sitoci	Al-Ani (9:54)	Archer (10:59)	Volto (8:47)	—N/a	Kara (5:01)	Harras (7:43)	Sitoci (7:47)
Ahura	Al-Ani (9:36)	Archer (11:24)	Volto (10:44)	Kara (5:01)	—N/a	Ahura (8:22)	Ahura (8:07)
Harras	Al-Ani (4:13)	Archer (8:02)	Volto (7:28)	Harras (7:43)	Ahura (8:22)	—N/a	Harras (8:46)
Heisenberg	Al-Ani (4:51)	Heisenberg (7:09)	Volto (8:16)	Sitoci (7:47)	Ahura (8:07)	Harras (8:46)	—N/a

Final
A1	Cara Noir	Win
B1	Marius Al-Ani	31:10

=== 2021 ===
The second Catch Grand Prix was a one-night tournament which took place on October 2, 2021. It was contested as a knockout tournament, where a special stipulation was applied to each match. Axel Tischer defeated Bobby Gunns in the final to win the tournament.

Quarterfinals
Bobby Gunns and Levaniel	Win
Leon van Gasteren and Michael Knight	12:08 (Note: This was a tag team match, in which the wrestler who scored the winning pinfall would qualify to the next round.)
Maggot	Win
Robert Dreissker	8:47 (Note: This was a first blood match.)
Axel Tischer Dennis Dullnig	Win
Francesco Akira Tristan Archer	11:56 (Note: This was a four-way match.)
Fast Time Moodo	Win
Stephanie Maze	16:01 (Note: This was a two out of three falls match.)

Semifinals
Bobby Gunns	Win
Maggot	9:07 (Note: This was a Relaxed Rules match.)
Axel Tischer	Win
Fast Time Moodo	9:47 (Note: This was an Ambition Rules match.)

Final
Bobby Gunns	Win
Axel Tischer	14:30 (Note: This was a Catch Grand Prix Rules match.)

=== 2025 ===
The third tournament, renamed the "King of the Catcher Tournament," was a three-day event held across four shows from September 26 to 28, 2025. It was contested as a round-robin tournament where eight wrestlers were split between two blocks of four wrestlers.

Current standings
Block A		Block B	
Elijah Blum	4	Ahura	6
Marius Al-Ani	3	Adam Priest	2
Bobby Gunns	3	Joseph Fenech Jr.	2
LaBron Kozone	2	Hektor Invictus	0

Block A	Al-Ani	Blum	Kozone	Gunns
Al-Ani	—N/a	Blum (10:44)	Al-Ani (12:18)	Draw (20:00)
Blum	Blum (10:44)	—N/a	Kozone (11:46)	Blum (10:21)
Kozone	Al-Ani (12:18)	Kozone (11:46)	—N/a	Gunns (7:39)
Gunns	Draw (20:00)	Blum (10:21)	Gunns (7:39)	—N/a
Block B	Invictus	Priest	Ahura	Fenech
Invictus	—N/a	N/A	Ahura (2:33)	Fenech (6:23)
Priest	N/A	—N/a	Ahura (8:22)	Priest (15:24)
Ahura	Ahura (2:33)	Ahura (8:22)	—N/a	Ahura (11:54)
Fenech	Fenech (6:23)	Priest (15:24)	Ahura (11:54)	—N/a

Final
A1	Elijah Blum	18:23
B1	Ahura	Pin

=== 2026 ===
The fourth tournament took place between and September 25 and 27, 2026.

Current standings
Block A		Block B	
Dennis Dullnig	4	Elijah Blum	4
Katsuhiko Nakajima	3	Peter Tihanyi	3
Thomas Shire	3	Dieter Schwartz	2
1 Called Manders	2	Axel Tischer	1

Block A	Dullnig	Nakajima	Shire	Manders
Dullnig	—N/a	Nakajima (14:55)	Dullnig (8:58)	Dullnig (3:38)
Nakajima	Nakajima (14:55)	—N/a	Draw (20:00)	Manders (15:13)
Shire	Dullnig (8:58)	Draw (20:00)	—N/a	Shire (12:05)
Manders	Dullnig (3:38)	Manders (15:13)	Shire (12:05)	—N/a
Block B	Blum	Tihanyi	Schwartz	Tischer
Blum	—N/a	Blum (14:50)	Blum (11:52)	Tischer (13:58)
Tihanyi	Blum (14:50)	—N/a	Tihanyi (9:27)	N/A (NC)
Schwartz	Blum (11:52)	Tihanyi (9:27)	—N/a	Schwartz (forfeit)
Tischer	Tischer (13:58)	N/A (NC)	Schwartz (forfeit)	—N/a

Final
A1	Dullnig	Pin
B1	Elijah Blum	1:30
