= The Rotation =

German professional wrestler

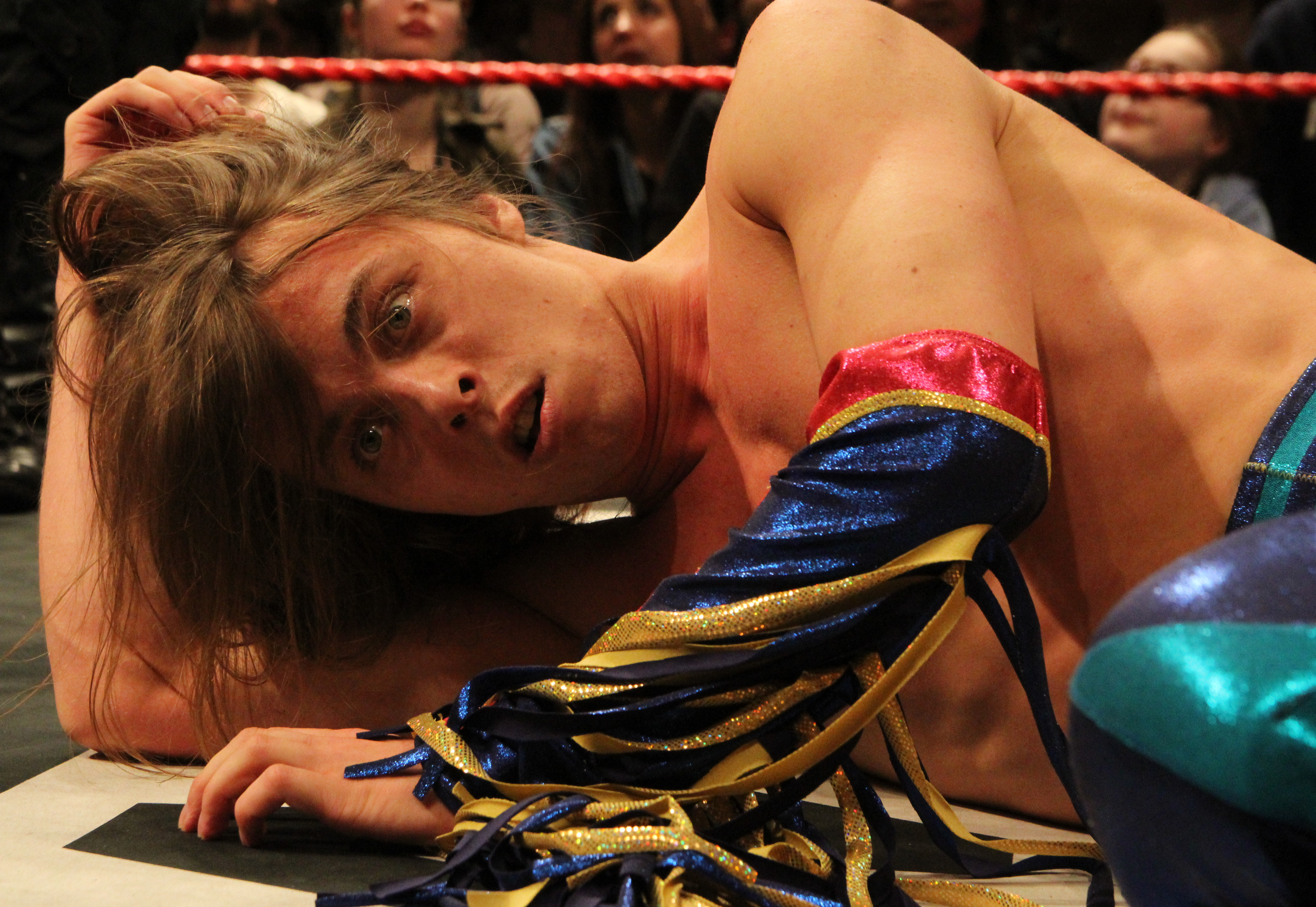
- The Rotation in March 2020

Personal information
- Born: Axel Halbach; 1996 (age 29–30) Remscheid, Germany

Professional wrestling career
- Ring name(s): The Immortal Rotation; Der schwarze Magier; Alexander Halbach; The Rotation
- Billed height: 176 cm (5 ft 9 in)
- Billed weight: 74 kg (163 lb)
- Trained by: Jonathan Gresham
- Debut: 2012

Axel Halbach (born 1996) is a German professional wrestler better known by his ring name The Rotation. He is currently working for the German promotion Westside Xtreme Wrestling where he is a former wXw Academy Trophy Champion. He is a former wXw Shotgun Champion. He is also the innovator of the "rotation-drill“.

== Professional wrestling career ==
=== Independent circuit (2013–Present) ===
Halbach worked as a freelancer until 2020 and wrestled for various promotions of the European independent scene. At GHW Hurricane Havoc 2019, an event promoted by German Hurricane wrestling, he unsuccessfully challenged the champion Oliver Carter, Super Crazy, Prince Ahura, Tristan Archer and Bernd Föhr in a five-way match for the GHW Zero Gravity Cup Championship.

==== Westside Xtreme Wrestling (2013–present) ====
Halbach made his professional wrestling debut on the second night of the wXw Movie Days 2013 from March 24, an event promoted by Westside Xtreme Wrestling where he took part in an eight-man royal rumble match in which he competed against Bad Bones, Walter, Karsten Beck, Toby Blunt, Kim Ray, Sasa Keel and Stefan Medoch. On the second night of the wXw Shotgun 2020 #2.03 on September 18, he unsuccessfully challenged Metehan for the wXw Shotgun Championship.

He is known for competing in signature events of the promotion such as the wxw 16 Carat Gold 2020, tournament in which he defeated Puma King in the first-round match but fell short to Eddie Kingston in the second round.

He also worked in the "wXw Shortcut To The Top" series of events in which he wrestled in traditional 30-man battle royal matches which are the signature bouts of the pay-per-view. He made his first appearance at the 2015 edition of the event, facing various opponents such as Grado, Axel Dieter Jr., Da Mack, Marty Scurll and Sha Samuels. At the 2018 edition, he competed in the traditional match where he faced various opponents such as Bobby Gunns, Alpha Female, Jurn Simmons, Doug Williams, Michael Dante and others. "At Shortcut To The Top 2019 on August 3, he competed in the same bout in which he faced the likes of Timothy Thatcher, El Lindaman, Ilja Dragunov, Shigehiro Irie, T-Hawk and many others. At Shortcut To The Top 2020 on August 21, Halbach competed in a 30-man battle royal also involving notable opponents such as Absolute Andy, Emil Sitoci, Killer Kelly, Norman Harras, Levaniel, Hektor Invictus and others.

== Championships and accomplishments ==
- Flemish Wrestling Force
  - Flemish Wrestling Cup (2017)
- German Hurricane Wrestling
  - GHW Zero Gravity Cup Championship (1 time)
- Ligaunabhängig
  - Dragonhearts Championship (1 time)
- Pro Wrestling Showdown
  - PWS Junior Heavyweight Championship (1 time)
- Westside Xtreme Wrestling
  - wXw Shotgun Championship (1 time)
  - wXw Academy Trophy Championship (1 time)
  - DTU Alto Impacto Championship (1 time)
