= Peter Tihanyi =

Hungarian professional wrestler

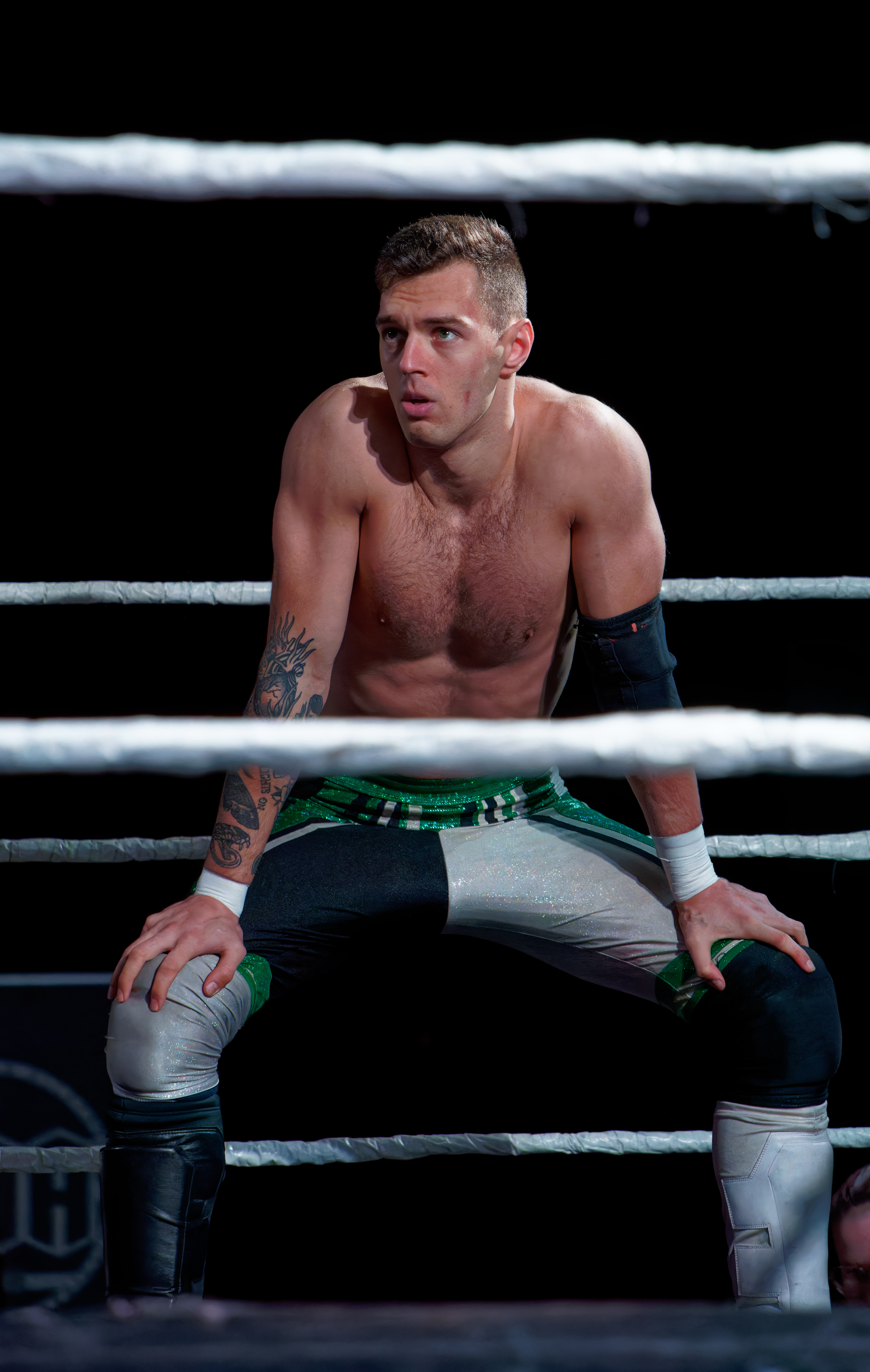
- Tihanyi in September 2023

Personal information
- Born: 8 March 2000 (age 26) Budapest, Hungary

Professional wrestling career
- Ring name: Death Ray Peter McFly Tihanyi Peter Peter Tihanyi
- Billed height: 188 cm (6 ft 2 in)
- Billed weight: 82 kg (181 lb)
- Debut: 2018

Peter Tihanyi (Hungarian: Tihanyi Péter) is a Hungarian professional wrestler currently signed to Westside Xtreme Wrestling (wXw) where he is a former two-time wXw Unified World Wrestling Champion. He also performs on the European independent circuit.

== Professional wrestling career ==
=== Hungarian Championship Wrestling (2018–present) ===
Tihanyi made his professional wrestling debut in Hungarian Championship Wrestling (HCW). During his time with the promotion, he has won the HCW Championship which is the promotion's top title on two separate occasions and the HCW Revolution Championship once. Due to his freelancer status in Europe, he seldomly still competes for house shows promoted by HCW.

=== German Wrestling Federation (2022–present) ===
In the German Wrestling Federation (GWF), Tihanyi is a former GWF Tag Team Champion alongside Fast Time Moodo. They won the titles at GWF Rising Heat on June 4, 2023, by defeating Marius Al-Ani and Tim Stübing. Tihanyi competed in the GWF Light Heavyweight World Cup, an annual competition held by the promotion in which he made his first appearance at the 2023 edition where he defeated LJ Cleary in the first rounds and then fell short to Tim Stübing, Ahura and Aytac Bahar in a four-way match in the finals.

At GWF Legacy in 2024 he won the GWF World Championship for the first time and defended it in a match against Mustafa Ali at GWF Global Warning 2025 in February. Here he sustained an injury which kept him from competing and defending his title, so it had to be vacated. Tihanyi returned to GWF in November 2025 in a (non-title) rematch against Ali, where Peter would stand victorious.

=== Westside Xtreme Wrestling (2021–present) ===
Tihanyi made his debut in Westside Xtreme Wrestling while still a freelancer on June 3, 2021, at wXw We Love Wrestling Zugaben Volume 1 where he teamed up with Gulyas Junior in a losing effort against Arrows Of Hungary (Dover and Icarus). During his time with the promotion, Tihanyi chased for various of its championships. At wXw True Colors 2022 on May 28, he unsuccessfully challenged Maggot for the wXw Shotgun Championship. At wXw Broken Rules XXI on November 11, 2023, Tihanyi teamed up with Fast Time Moodo to unsuccessfully challenge reigning champions Amboss (Icarus and Laurance Roman) and Dennis Dullnig and Hektor Invictus for the wXw World Tag Team Championship. He took part into the inaugural tournament of the WXw European Championship in which he fell short to Elijah Blum in the first rounds. On the second night of the 2023 edition of the WXw World Tag Team Festival, Tihanyi defeated Laurance Roman to win the wXw Unified World Wrestling Championship in a three-way match also involving Robert Dreissker.

Tihanyi competed in various signature events of wXw such as the Shortcut To The Top event in which he made his first appearance at the 2021 edition where he competed in the traditional battle royal disputed for the number one contendership at the wXw Unified World Wrestling Championship won by Jurn Simmons and also involving notable opponents such as Bobby Gunns, Levaniel, Norman Harras, Senza Volto and others.

In the 16 Carat Gold Tournament, Tihanyi made his first appearance at the 2022 edition where he defeated Aigle Blanc in the first rounds, then fell short to Jonathan Gresham in the second ones. One year later at the 2023 edition, he defeated Trey Miguel in the first rounds and Francesco Akira in the second ones, then fell short to Axel Tischer in the semifinals. At the 2024 edition, Tihanyi made it to the finals of the competition by defeating El Hijo de Dr. Wagner Jr. in the first rounds, Michael Oku in the quarterfinals, Aigle Blanc in the semifinals, then fell short to Laurance Roman in the finals.

=== Progress Wrestling (2022) ===
Tihanyi took part in the 2022 edition of Progress Wrestling's Natural Progression Series tournament in which he fell short to Ricky Knight Jr. in the first rounds. He also made an appearance at PROGRESS Chapter 142: The Deadly Viper Tour - Codename: California Mountain Snake on September 25, 2022, where he defeated Alexander Roth, Hari Singh and Tom Thelwell in four-way competition.

=== TV Total - Promi Wrestling ===
On December 7, 2024, He Wrestled for the German TV Channel ProSieben on TV Total - Promi Wrestling aired January 4, 2025. The Event was a Tag Team Tournament to crown the first ever WTF Tag Team Champions The Tournament was so designed that one Celebrity and one Pro Wrestler Wrestled together as a Tag Team. Later The three winning Tag Teams hat to Wrestle each other in the Main event in an Relaxed Rules Three Way Elimination Match. Casselly and Tihanyi won Both the first round and the Main Event Match and became the inaugural WTF Tag Team Champions.

== Championships and accomplishments ==
- Hungarian Championship Wrestling
  - HCW Championship (2 times)
  - HCW Revolution Championship (1 time)
- German Wrestling Federation
  - GWF World Championship (1 time)
  - GWF Tag Team Championship (1 time) – with Fast Time Moodo
  - Battlefield (2024)
  - GWF Legacy (2024)
- German Wrestling Promotion
  - WrestlingCorner.de Championship (1 time, current)
- Pro Wrestling Illustrated
  - Ranked No. 125 of the top 500 singles wrestlers in the PWI 500 of 2026
- Westside Xtreme Wrestling
  - wXw Unified World Wrestling Championship (2 times)
  - Shortcut To The Top (2024, 2025)
- WrestlingKULT
  - WrestlingKULT Championship (1 time)
- TV Total - Promi Wrestling
  - WTF Tag Team Championship (1 time, current, inaugural) – with René Casselly
  - WTF Tag Team Title Tournament (2025) – with René Casselly
