= Dennis Dullnig =

Swiss professional wrestler

Personal information
- Born: September 2 Zürich, Switzerland

Professional wrestling career
- Ring name: Cash Crash Dennis Dullnig
- Billed height: 178 cm (5 ft 10 in)
- Billed weight: 80 kg (176 lb)
- Trained by: Joe E. Legend; Alex Wright; Marshal T
- Debut: 2010

Dennis Dullnig is a Swiss professional wrestler, currently working as a freelancer. He is best known for his tenure with Westside Xtreme Wrestling (wXw) where he is the former one-time wXw Shotgun Champion and former two-time wXw World Tag Team Champion, and for his work in various promotions from the European independent scene.

== Professional wrestling career ==
=== European independent circuit (2010–present) ===
Dullnig made his professional wrestling debut in Swiss Championship Wrestling at SCW Rookie Show: The Last One, a house show promoted on December 18, 2010, where he fell short to Maik Tuga in singles competition. Dullnig also worked in various other promotions from the European independent circuit such as New European Championship Wrestling (NECW), Swiss Championship Wrestling (SCW), German Hurricane Wrestling (GHW), and others.

=== Westside Xtreme Wrestling (2015–present) ===
Dullnig is best known for his tenure with Westside Xtreme Wrestling. He made his debut in the promotion at wXw Theater Neumarkt on September 20, 2015, under the ring name of Cash Crash, where he teamed up with Drake Destroyer and fell short to Calvin Carter and Maik Tuga in tag team competition.

Dullnig competed in various of the promotion's signature events. In the wXw Catch Grand Prix, he made his first appearance at the 2021 edition where he fell short to Axel Tischer, Francesco Akira and Tristan Archer in the quarterfinals. In the 16 Carat Gold Tournament, he made his first appearance at the 2022 edition where he fell short to LuFisto in the first rounds.

In the WXw World Tag Team Festival, Dullnig made his first appearance at the 2023 edition of the competition, where he teamed up with his "Cash & Hektor" tag team partner Hektor Invictus and won the entire tournament by defeating Maggot and Psycho Mike in the first rounds, Jurn Simmons and Levaniel in the semifinals, and Amboss (Laurance Roman and Robert Dreissker) and Renegades (Mizuki Watase and Shigehiro Irie) in a three-way final which was also contested for the wXw World Tag Team Championship. Dullnig and Invictus won the titles on the second occasion at wXw 23rd Anniversary on December 23, 2023 by defeating Amboss (Icarus and Laurance Roman). At wXw We Love Wrestling #70 on September 19, 2025, Dullnig fought tag team Invictus into a double disqualification for the wXw Shotgun Championship, with the rematch occurring one week later at wXw We Love Wrestling #71, where Dullnig emerged victorious, winning the title.

At wXw Shortcut To The Top 2024 on August 10, Dullnig competed in the traditional battle royal for the number one contendership for the wXw Unified World Wrestling Championship, bout won by Peter Tihanyi and also involving notable opponents such as Michael Oku, Mike D Vecchio, Aigle Blanc, Sha Samuels and others.

== Championships and accomplishments ==
- Frontier Championship Wrestling
  - FCW Championship (1 time)
- German Hurricane Wrestling
  - GHW District Championship (1 time)
- Pro Wrestling Illustrated
  - Ranked No. 343 of the top singles wrestlers in the PWI 500 in 2026
- Scuola Italiana Wrestling
  - SIW Superior Wild Championship (1 time)
- Swiss Championship Wrestling
  - SCW European Championship (1 time)
  - SCW Tag Team Championship (1 time) – with Mr. Exotic Erotic
- Westside Xtreme Wrestling
  - wXw Shotgun Championship (1 time)
  - wXw World Tag Team Championship (2 times) – with Hektor Invictus
  - wXw World Tag Team Festival (2023) – with Hektor Invictus
  - wXw Catch Grand Prix (2026)
