= Levaniel =

German professional wrestler

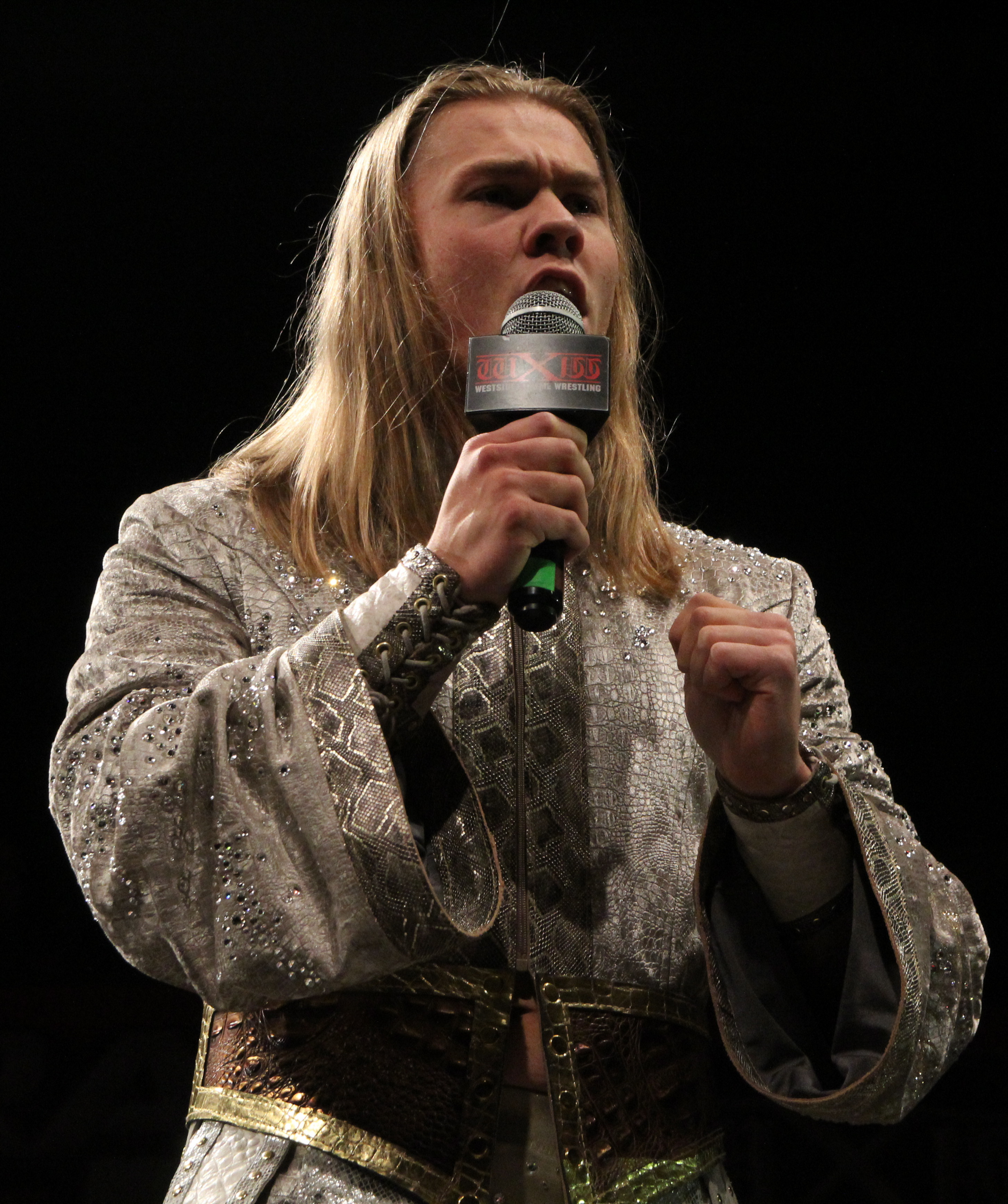
- Levaniel in March 2020

Personal information
- Born: July 21, 1997 (age 29) Hamburg, Germany

Professional wrestling career
- Ring name: Levaniel
- Billed height: 185 cm (6 ft 1 in)
- Billed weight: 92 kg (203 lb)
- Trained by: Alex Wright; Hektor Invictus; Karsten Kretschmer; Veit Müller
- Debut: 2018

Niklas Knoche better known by his ring name Levaniel is a German professional wrestler currently signed to Westside Xtreme Wrestling (wXw). He is the longest reigning as a former wXw Shotgun Champion and a former wXw Unified World Wrestling Champion. He is also known for his various tenures with promotions from the European independent scene.

== Professional wrestling career ==
=== Westside Xtreme Wrestling (2018–present) ===
Knoche made his professional wrestling debut in Westside Xtreme Wrestling's Academy branch at the wXw Academy Scouting The Next Generation 29 event from August 18, 2018, where he fell short to Winchester in singles competition.

Knoche began chasing for multiple championships promoted by the company. He first competed for the wXw Academy Championship at wXw Academy Scouting The Next Generation 35 on February 17, 2019, where he fell short to the retaining champion Vinny Vortex and Norman Harras in a three-way match. At wXw Road To Broken Rules XIX: Bielefeld on October 26, 2019, Levaniel unsuccessfully challenged for the wXw Shotgun Championship in a three-way bout won by retaining champion Axel Tischer and Avalanche. He won his first title, the wXw Unified World Wrestling Championship at wXw 22nd Anniversary on December 17, 2022, when he defeated Tristan Archer.

Knoche competed in various of the promotion's signature events. One of them is the Shortcut To The Top in which he made his first appearance at the 2019 edition from August 3. The competition in the traditional battle royal was disputed for the number one contendership for the wXw Unified World Wrestling Championship won by Francis Kaspin and also involving various notable opponents such as Alexander James, Chris Brookes, El Lindaman, Jay Skillet, Aussie Open (Kyle Fletcher and Mark Davis), Walter, David Starr, Shigehiro Irie, Sha Samuels and many others. One year later at the 2020 edition of Shortcut To The Top, he competed in the same traditional battle royal won by Mike Schwarz and also involving Absolute Andy, Emil Sitoci, Marius Al-Ani, Prince Ahura, Vincent Heisenberg, The Rotation and many others. In 2021, he competed in the battle royal won by Jurn Simmons and also involving Aigle Blanc, Bobby Gunns, Dennis Dullnig, Peter Tihanyi, Senza Volto and many others. Knoche won the 2022 battle royal, which gave him a shot to the heavyweight title which he subsequently won. The match also included the likes of Teoman, Laurance Roman, Fast Time Moodo, Maggot and others.

In the WXw Catch Grand Prix, he made his first appearance at the 2021 edition where he teamed up with Bobby Gunns to defeat Leon van Gasteren and Michael Knight in the first rounds. Gunns was the one to score the pinfall of the bout and was subsequently qualified to the next rounds without Knoche.

=== Independent circuit (2018–present) ===
Knoche competed in several promotions from the European independent scene as a developmental talent sent by wXw. In Yawara Wrestling, he won the vacant tag team titles alongside Justus von der Heid at YAWARA Wrestling Reunion XVIII February 23, 2019. He championed in a gauntlet tag bout in which they defeated the teams of Brüder des Nordens (Lukas Robinson and Matthias Bernstein), Rott Und Flott (Michael Schenkenberg and Nikita Charisma), Grup Anarsi (Abdul Kenan and Aytac Bahar) and Kielside (Bennet and PJ), and Rock n Roll Radicalz (Briggs and Fynn Freyhart).

== Championships and accomplishments ==
- Nordic Championship Wrestling
  - International NCW Cruiserweight Championship (1 time)
- Pro Wrestling Illustrated
  - Ranked No. 177 of the top 500 singles wrestlers in the PWI 500 of 2023
- Westside Xtreme Wrestling
  - wXw Unified World Wrestling Championship (1 time)
  - wXw Shotgun Championship (1 time)
  - Shortcut To The Top (2022)
- Yawara Wrestling
  - Yawara Tag Team Championship (1 time) – with Justus von der Heid
