= WXw Shotgun Championship =

Professional wrestling championship

wXw Shotgun Championship
- Current title design

Details
- Promotion: Westside Xtreme Wrestling
- Date established: August 18, 2013
- Current champion: Alex Duke
- Date won: September 27, 2026
Statistics
- First champion: Ilja Dragunov
- Most reigns: (3 reigns): David Starr; Axel Tischer
- Longest reign: Maggot (328 days)
- Shortest reign: Mason Ryan, Norman Harras and Ninja Mack (1 day)
- Oldest champion: Axel Tischer (39 years, 157 days)
- Youngest champion: Ilja Dragunov (19 years, 312 days)
- Heaviest champion: Avalanche (295 lbs)
- Lightest champion: Maggot (161 lbs)

The wXw Shotgun Championship is a professional wrestling championship created and promoted by the German promotion Westside Xtreme Wrestling. All of the matches disputed for the title are broadcast on wXw's YouTube channel. The first champion was crowned on August 18, 2013. Ilja Dragunov defeated Tony Blunt in the finals of a tournament to become the first champion.

== Title history ==
There have been a total of 43 reigns and four vacancies shared between 34 different champions. The current champion is Axel Tischer who is in his third reign.

Key
No.	Overall reign number
Reign	Reign number for the specific champion
Days	Number of days held
+	Current reign is changing daily

No.	Champion	Championship change			Reign statistics		Notes	Ref.
No.	Champion	Date	Event	Location	Reign	Days	Notes	Ref.
1	Ilja Dragunov	August 18, 2013	Fans Appreciation Weekend 2013 – Day 2	Oberhausen, Germany	1	152	Defeated Toby Blunt in a tournament final to become the inaugural champion	
—	Vacated	January 17, 2014	—	—	—	—	Vacated due to Dragunov suffering a severe head injury	
2	Axel Tischer	January 18, 2014	Back to the Roots XIII	Oberhausen, Germany	1	266	Defeated Carnage in a Steel Cage match for the vacant Championship.	
3	John Klinger	October 11, 2014	14th Anniversary Tour: Prague	Prague, Czech Republic	1	7		
4	Mason Ryan	October 18, 2014	14th Anniversary Tour: SlamMania II	Mannheim, Germany	1	1		
5	John Klinger	October 19, 2014	14th Anniversary Tour: Apolda	Apolda, Germany	2	139		
6	Ilja Dragunov	March 7, 2015	16 Carat Gold 2015 – Day 2	Oberhausen, Germany	2	105		
7	Kim Ray	June 20, 2015	More Than Wrestling Tour: Finale – Shortcut To The Top	Oberhausen, Germany	1	175		
8	Sasa Keel	December 12, 2015	15th Anniversary Tour: Finale	Oberhausen, Germany	1	112		
9	Da Mack	April 2, 2016	True Colors 2016	Dresden, Germany	1	181		
10	Pete Dunne	September 30, 2016	World Tag Team League 2016 – Day 1	Oberhausen, Germany	1	15		
11	Tyler Bate	October 15, 2016	Shotgun Live Tour 2016: Bielefeld	Bielefeld, Germany	1	34		
12	David Starr	November 18, 2016	Shotgun Live Tour 2016: Gotha	Gotha, Germany	1	15		
13	Chris Brookes	December 3, 2016	Shotgun Live Tour 2016: Berlin	Berlin, Germany	1	7	This was a four-way match, also involving Dave Crist and Ilja Dragunov	
14	David Starr	December 10, 2016	16th Anniversary	Oberhausen, Germany	2	92	This was a four-way match, also involving Da Mack and Pete Dunne	
15	Emil Sitoci	March 12, 2017	16 Carat Gold 2017 – Day 3	Oberhausen, Germany	1	62	This was a four-way match, also involving Cody Rhodes and Jurn Simmons	
16	Angélico	May 13, 2017	Superstars of Wrestling 2017	Oberhausen, Germany	1	49	This was a four-way match, also involving Penta el Zero M and Rey Fénix	
17	David Starr	July 1, 2017	Shortcut to the Top 2017	Cologne, Germany	3	62	This was a three-way match, also involving Emil Sitoci	
18	Ivan Kiev	September 1, 2017	Fans Appreciation Night 2017	Hamburg, Germany	1	113	This was a three-way match, also involving Flip Gordon	
19	Bobby Gunns	December 23, 2017	17th Anniversary	Oberhausen, Germany	1	224		
20	Marius Al-Ani	August 4, 2018	Shortcut To The Top 2018	Oberhausen, Germany	1	238		
21	Emil Sitoci	March 30, 2019	16 Carat Gold Revenge 2019: Frankfurt	Frankfurt, Germany	2	167	This was a three-way match, also involving Julian Pace	
22	Avalanche	September 13, 2019	FAN 2019 - Du Entscheidest	Hamburg, Germany	1	92	This was a Street Fight match	
23	Jay Skillet	December 14, 2019	19th Anniversary	Oberhausen, Germany	1	63	This was a four-way match also involving Absolute Andy and Veit Müller.	
24	Avalanche	February 15, 2020	Road To 16 Carat Gold: Bielefeld	Bielefeld, Germany	2	22		
25	Alexander Wolfe	March 8, 2020	16 Carat Gold 2020	Oberhausen, Germany	2	82	This was a three-way match also involving Ilja Dragunov. Wolfe was previously known as Axel Tischer.	
—	Vacated	May 29, 2020	—	—	—	—	Wolfe was unable to defend the title due to the COVID-19 pandemic.	
26	Metehan	July 30, 2020	Shotgun	Oberhausen, Germany	1	154	Defeated Hektor Invictus in the finals of a tournament to win the vacant Championship.	
27	Norman Harras	December 31, 2020	Shotgun Silvester Epeziel	Oberhausen, Germany	1	148		
28	Prince Ahura	May 28, 2021	Drive Of Champions 2021	Oberhausen, Germany	1	73		
—	Vacated	August 9, 2021	—	—	—	—		
29	Vincent Heisenberg	September 25, 2021	Catch Grand Prix 2021	Oberhausen, Germany	1	26	Defeated Norman Harras to win the vacant title.	
30	Michael Knight	October 21, 2021	wXw Live In Limbach-Oberfrohna	Limbach-Oberfrohna, Germany	1	57		
31	Norman Harras	December 17, 2021	wXw We Love Wrestling #26	Borken, Germany	2	1		
32	Absolute Andy	December 18, 2021	wXw 21st Anniversary	Oberhausen, Germany	1	76		
—	Vacated	March 4, 2022	—	—	—	—	Andy was unable to defend the title due to illness.	
33	Ninja Mack	March 5, 2022	wXw 16 Carat Gold 2022	Oberhausen, Germany	1	1	Defeated Ace Romero in a lotterie match to win the vacant title.	
34	Maggot	March 6, 2022	wXw 16 Carat Gold 2022	Oberhausen, Germany	1	328	This was a four-way match also involving Ender Kara and The Rotation.	
35	Laurance Roman	January 28, 2023	wXw Back To The Roots 2023	Oberhausen, Germany	1	266		
36	Elijah Blum	October 21, 2023	wXw We Love Wrestling - Live In Bielefeld	Bielefeld, Germany	1	63		
37	The Rotation	December 24, 2023	wXw 23rd Anniversary	Oberhausen, Germany	1	76	This was a six-way scramble also involving Alex Duke, Bobby Gunns, Jacob Crane and Nick Schreier.	
38	Levaniel	March 8, 2024	wXw 16 Carat Gold 2024	Oberhausen, Germany	1	212	This was a three-way match also involving Maggot.	
39	Anita Vaughan	October 6, 2024	wXw World Tag Team Festival 2024	Oberhausen, Germany	1	153	Vaughan became the first ever female wrestler to hold the championship.	
40	Joseph Fenech Jr.	March 8, 2025	wXw Shotgun Bonanza	Oberhausen, Germany	1	28		
41	Hektor Invictus	April 5, 2025	wXw We Love Wrestling: 16 Carat Gold Revenge	Frankfurt, Hessen	1	176		
42	Dennis Dullnig	September 28, 2025	wXw We Love Wrestling #71	Oberhausen, Germany	1	195		
43	Axel Tischer	April 11, 2026	wXw We Love Wrestling #76	Dresden, Germany	3	169		
—	Vacated	September 27, 2026	Pro-Wrestling Grand Prix 2026	—	—	—		
44	Alex Duke	September 27, 2026	Pro-Wrestling Grand Prix 2026	Oberhausen, Germany	1	38+	Defeated Miles Deville, Robert Dreissker and Zoltan to win the vacant title.	

== Combined reigns ==
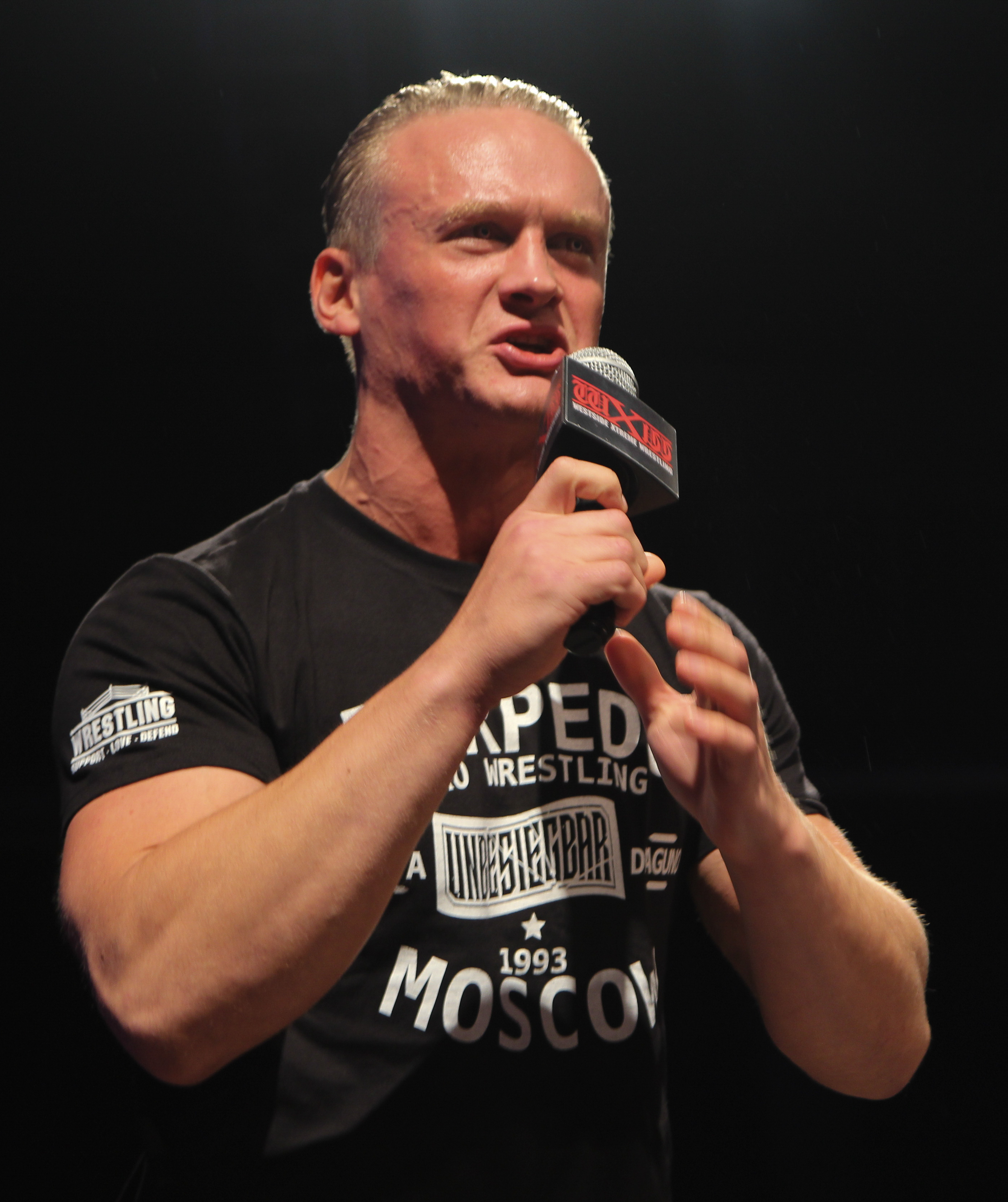
Inaugural champion Ilja Dragunov.

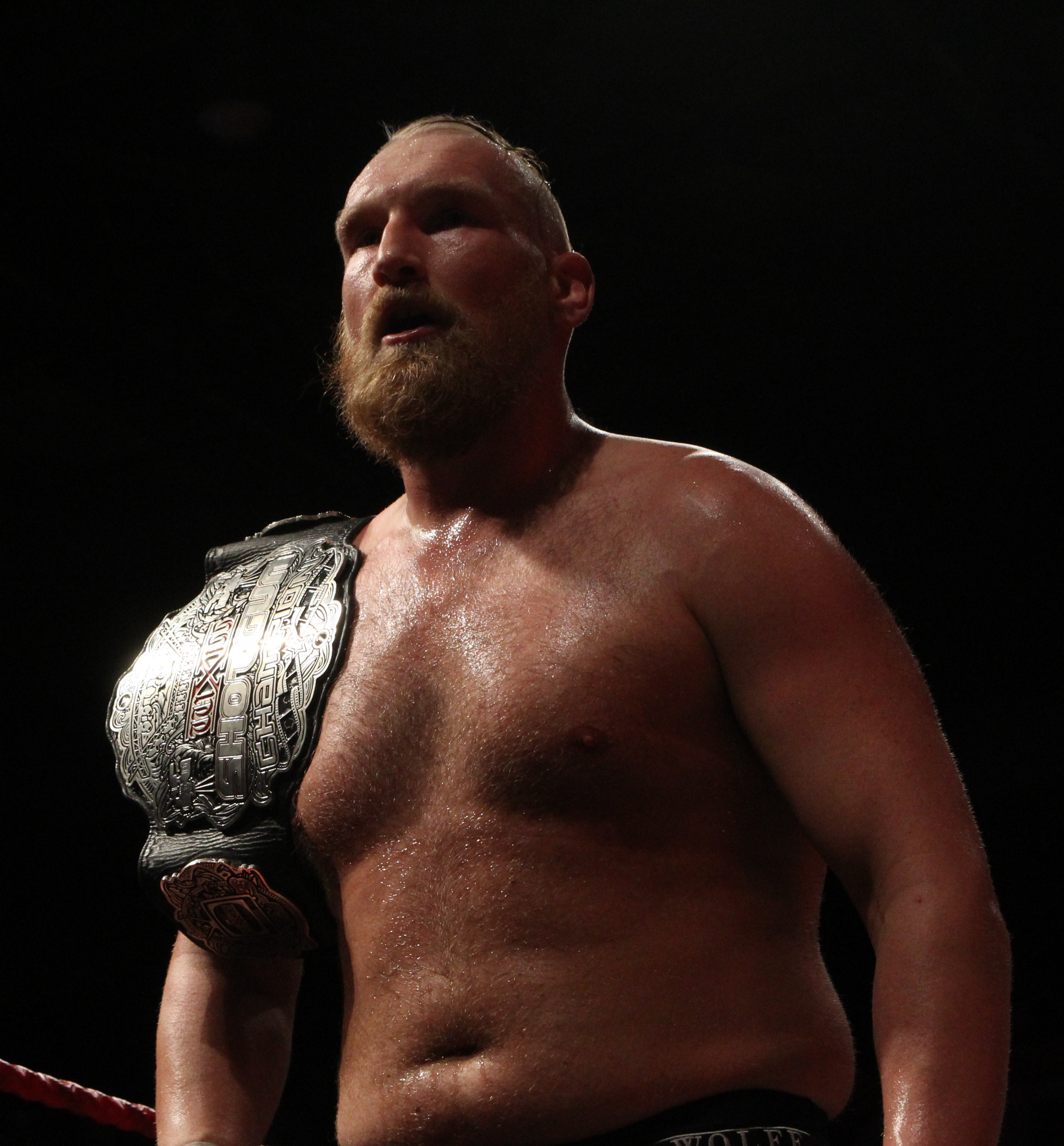
Record-tying three-time champion Alexander Wolfe with the title in 2020.

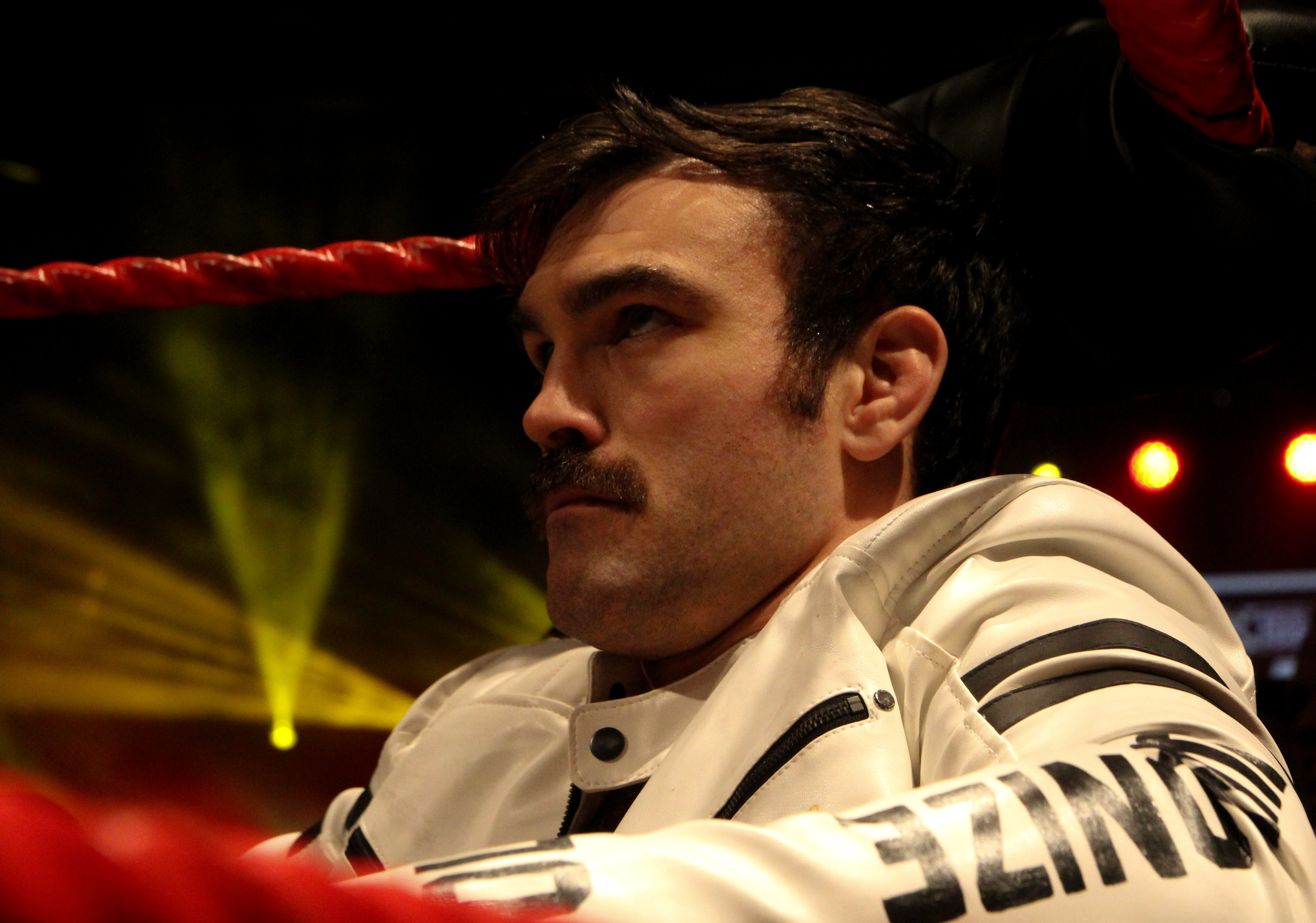
Record-tying three-time champion David Starr.

As of November 4, 2026.

†	Indicates the current champion

Rank	Champion	No. of reigns	Combined days
1	Axel Tischer/Alexander Wolfe	3	517
2	Maggot	1	328
3	Laurance Roman	1	266
4	Ilja Dragunov	2	257
5	Marius Al-Ani	1	238
6	Emil Sitoci	2	229
7	Bobby Gunns	1	224
8	Levaniel	1	212
9	Dennis Dullnig	1	195
10	Da Mack	1	181
11	Hektor Invictus	1	176
12	Kim Ray	1	175
13	David Starr	3	169
14	Metehan	1	154
15	Anita Vaughan	1	153
16	Norman Harras	2	149
17	John Klinger	2	146
18	Avalanche	2	114
19	Ivan Kiev	1	113
20	Sasa Keel	1	112
21	Absolute Andy	1	76
21	The Rotation	1	76
23	Prince Ahura	1	73
24	Elijah Blum	1	63
24	Jay Skillet	1	63
26	Michael Knight	1	57
27	Angélico	1	49
28	Alex Duke †	1	38+
29	Tyler Bate	1	34
30	Joseph Fenech Jr.	1	28
31	Vincent Heisenberg	1	26
32	Pete Dunne	1	15
33	Chris Brookes	1	7
34	Mason Ryan	1	1
34	Ninja Mack	1	1

== See also ==
- wXw Unified World Wrestling Championship
- wXw World Tag Team Championship
