= Tristan Archer =

French professional wrestler

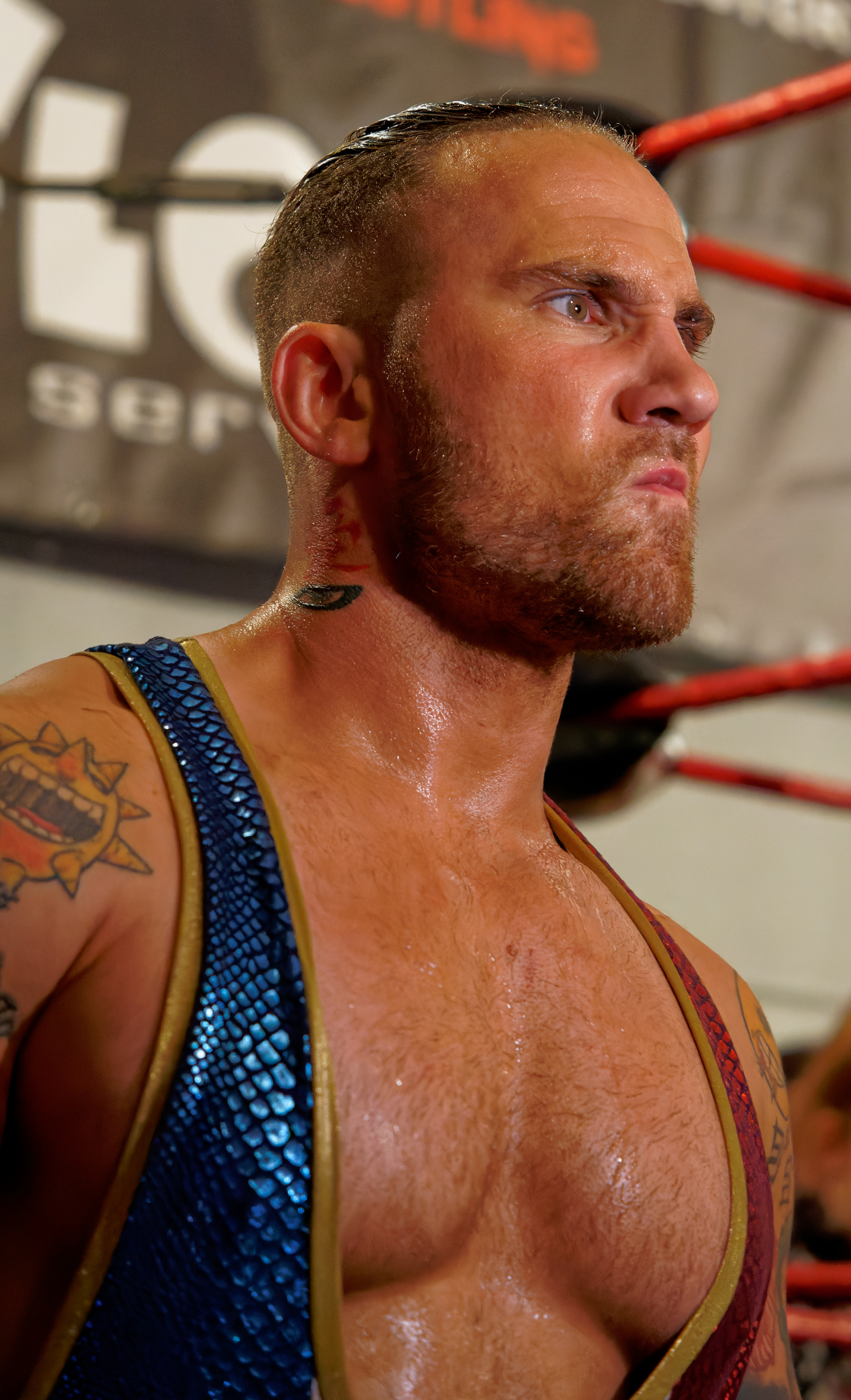
- Archer in June 2022

Personal information
- Born: September 7, 1985 (age 41) Amiens, France

Professional wrestling career
- Ring name(s): Clément Petiot; David Goliath; Tristan Archer
- Billed height: 179 cm (5 ft 10 in)
- Billed weight: 105 kg (231 lb)
- Trained by: Lance Storm; Joey Ryan; Jesse Hernandez
- Debut: 2009

Clément Petiot, better known by his ring name Tristan Archer, is a French professional wrestler. As of September 2024, he is currently a free agent performing on the European independent circuit. He is best known for performing in Westside Xtreme Wrestling (wXw), where he was a former two-time wXw Unified World Wrestling Champion. He is also known for his participation in the WWE Cruiserweight Classic, representing France under his real name.

In September 2024, amidst physical and psychological abuse allegations being put on him by fellow French wrestler Amale, Petiot was released from wXw, putting his career overall in jeopardy.

== Professional wrestling career ==
=== European independent circuit (2009–present) ===
Petiot made his professional wrestling debut under the name of David Goliath at 2FC Controverse Dans La Ville Rose, a house show promoted by Force Francophone de Catch on November 21, 2009, where he competed twice, first by falling short to Stixx in singles competition, and secondly in a battle royal to determine the number one contender for the 2FC Heavyweight Championship, bout won by Darren Burridge and also involving Jody Fleisch, Mark Haskins and others.

=== Japan excursion (2023) ===
Petiot spent a month in the Japanese independent scene in the summer of 2023 where he mainly competed in Big Japan Pro Wrestling as a foreign guest. He made his first appearance on the second night of the BJW Hatagaya Rokugou-dori Shopping Street Event Pro-Wrestling on July 22, 2023, where he competed in a battle royal won by Yuki Ishikawa and also involving various opponents such as Kazuki Hashimoto, Ryuji Ito and Yasufumi Nakanoue. At BJW Shopping Street Wrestling 2023 Series ~ New Chapter Begins on July 29, 2023, he teamed up with Daichi Hashimoto and Kota Sekifuda to unsuccessfully challenge Hideyoshi Kamitani, Kazumi Kikuta and Yuki Ishikawa for the Yokohama Shopping Street 6-Man Tag Team Championship. Besides BJW, Petiot competed in a match promoted by Total Triumph Team (TTT) at a house show promoted on July 23, 2023, where he teamed up with Fuminori Abe to unsuccessfully challenge Syuou Fujiwara and Takumi Tsukamoto for the TTT Indie Unified Tag Team Championship.

=== Westside Xtreme Wrestling (2014; 2020–2024) ===
Petiot made his debut in Westside Xtreme Wrestling at wXw 14th Anniversary Tour: Borken on October 24, 2014, where he fell short to Kim Ray.

After a six-year no-show, he returned to the promotion at one of its signature events, the wXw Shortcut To The Top, at the inaugural edition of 2020 from August 21, where he unsuccessfully challenged Bobby Gunns for the Unified World Wrestling Championship. One year later at the 2021 edition of the event, Petiot competed in the pay-per-view's signature traditional battle royal, bout won by Jurn Simmons which also involved various other notable opponents, both male and female such as Aigle Blanc, Avalanche, Levaniel, Tayra Gates and many others. He continued to make regular appearances for the company in its other signature events. As for the Catch Grand Prix, where he made his first appearance at the 2020 edition in which he placed himself in the block B, where he finished as a runner-up by scoring a total of eight points after going against Cara Noir, Senza Volto, Emil Sitoci, Prince Ahura, Norman Harras and Vincent Heisenberg, failing to qualify to the finals. At the 2021 edition, he competed in a four-way first round match won by Axel Tischer and also involving Francesco Akira and Dennis Dullnig. In the 16 Carat Gold Tournament, Petiot made his first appearance at the 2023 edition where he defeated Mike D Vecchio in the first round, but fell short to Shigehiro Irie in the second round.

Petiot won the Unified World Wrestling Championship by defeating Axel Tischer on the finals night of the 2022 16 Carat Gold Tournament. He would hold the title on one more occasion beginning with April 30, 2022, when he defeated Jurn Simmons at We Love Wrestling - SLAM In Den Mai. Another title for which he competed was the wXw Shotgun Championship by battling in a three-way match against reigning champion Elijah Blum and Aigle Blanc at wXw We Love Wrestling - Live in Bad Säckingen on November 4, 2023. Following the allegations made in September 2024, wXw announced that they will no longer work with Archer.

=== World Wrestling Entertainment (2016, 2021) ===
Due to being a developmental talent representing wXw, Petiot shared two brief tenures with the American promotion WWE. In the first one, he competed in the Cruiserweight Classic, a tournament held to determine the inaugural WWE Cruiserweight Champion in which he fell short to Cedric Alexander in one of the first round matches from July 13, 2016. In his second tenure, he competed in two bouts promoted by the NXT UK brand. In the first one from WWE NXT UK #154 of July 22, 2021, he fell short to Joseph Conners in singles competition. At WWE NXT UK #155 on July 29, 2021, he fell short to Jordan Devlin.

== Personal life ==
Petiot was previously in a relationship with fellow professional wrestler Amale Dib. On September 3, 2024, Dib released a statement on X, accusing Petiot of "physical, psychological and emotional abuse", as well as cheating, threatening Dib's family, racist remarks due to her Moroccan heritage, misogyny, stalking, and threats to blacklist her from the wrestling scene entirely in France after her WWE release in 2022. She detailed the assault that Petiot gave against a female friend of Dib's, and stated that, in partiality to the incident, that Petiot displays "violent behavior towards [her], other women, [her] colleagues and fans". Petiot allegedly asked her to not go forward with making the allegations public, which coincided with the previous peaks of the Speaking Out movement in 2020. Dib stated that, due to an incident regarding her and Petiot at unnamed wrestling events in Europe, that Petiot had to be cut from any WWE coverage, including him participating in some events, including Backlash France. Due to the psychological pressure put on her by Petiot, Dib stated that she had grown into an eating disorder, with her losing 45 kilograms (99 lb) during and after the relationship at various points. After the allegations came about from Dib, Petiot was taken off programmes in France that month and abroad, as well as him being released from wXw.

== Championships and accomplishments ==
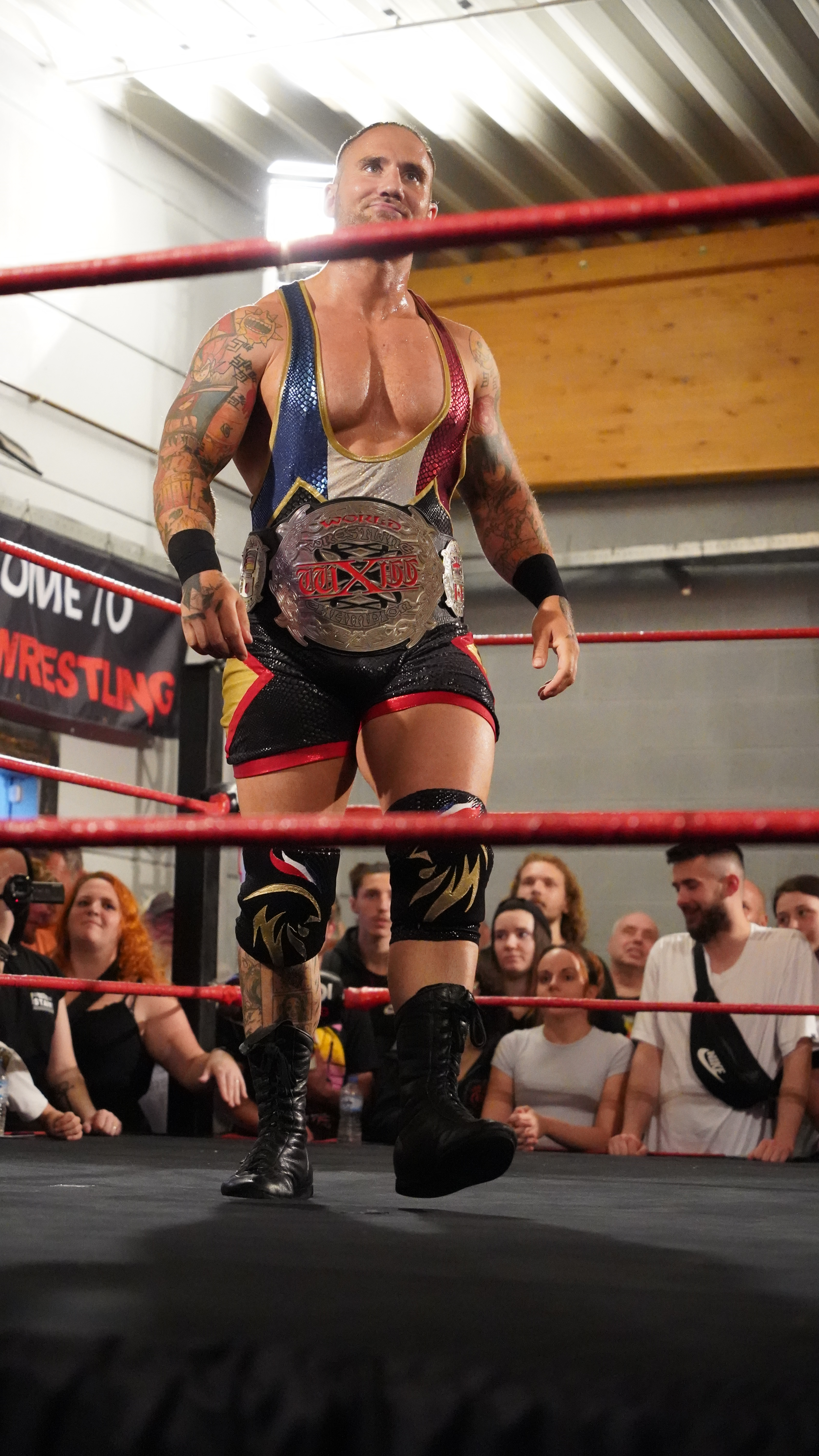
Archer is a two-time wXw Unified World Wrestling Champion...

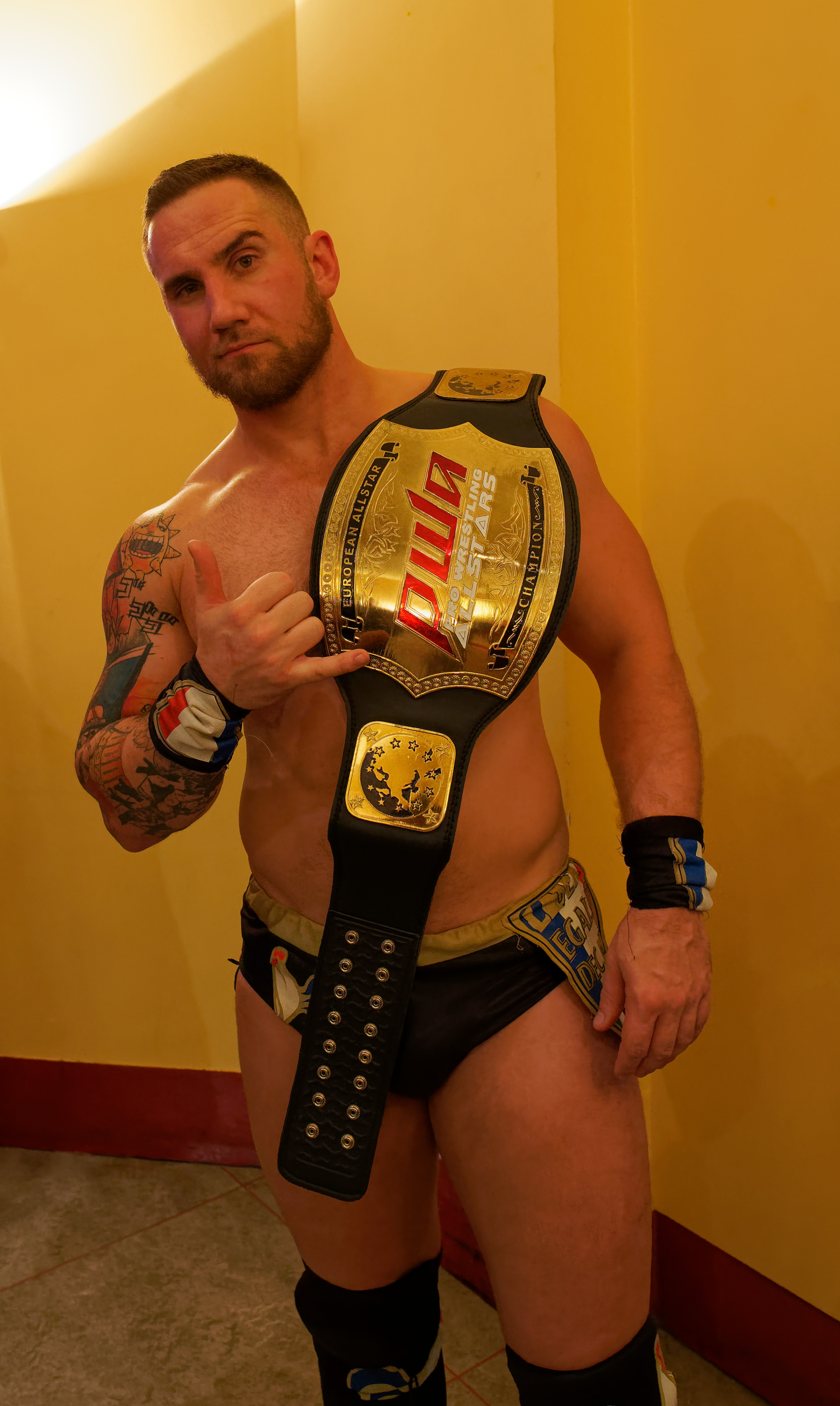
...and a PWA European Allstar Champion.

- Association of Wrestling Professionals
  - APC Championship (3 times)
  - Tournoi Des Poids-Lourds (2012, 2019)
  - Resistance Tournament (2020)
- AYA Catch
  - AYA Catch Championship (1 time)
- Catch As Catch Can
  - CACC Supreme Championship (1 time)
  - Tournoi Des Geants Tournament (2024)
- Championship Of Wrestling
  - cOw Tag Team Championship (1 time) – with Durancon
- European Catch Tour Association
  - ECTA Heavyweight Championship (1 time)
- European Pro Wrestling
  - EPW Heavyweight Championship (1 time)
- German Hurricane Wrestling
  - GHW Heavyweight Championship (1 time)
- Hungarian Championship Wrestling
  - HCW Championship (1 time)
- International Catch Wrestling Alliance
  - ICWA Heavyweight Championship (2 times)
  - ICWA France Heavyweight Championship (1 time)
- N'Catch
  - N'Catch Major Championship (1 time, final)
- Ouest Catch
  - Ouest Catch Championship (1 time)
- Passion Pro
  - Passion Pro Championship (1 time)
  - Passion Cup (2022)
- Pro Wrestling Allstars
  - PWA European Allstar Championship (1 time)
- Pro Wrestling Illustrated
  - Ranked No. 78 of the top 500 singles wrestlers in the PWI 500 of 2023
- Pro Wrestling Showdown
  - PWS Heavyweight Championship (1 time)
- WrestlingKULT
  - WrestlingKULT Championship (1 time)
- Westside Xtreme Wrestling
  - WXw Unified World Wrestling Championship (2 times)
  - Fight For Paris II (2022)
