= German Wrestling Federation =

Professional wrestling promotion in Berlin, Germany

- Official logo of the promotion
- Acronym: GWF
- Founded: 1995
- Headquarters: Berlin, Germany
- Founder(s): Ahmed Chaer, Crazy Sexy Mike
- Owner(s): Ahmed Chaer, Crazy Sexy Mike
- Website: gwf-wrestling.com www.wearegwf.com

German Wrestling Federation (GWF) is a professional wrestling promotion which has been founded and is based in Berlin, Germany.

While the promotion has toured through Germany and has held events in Bochum, Rostock, Lübeck, Hennigsdorf and Hamburg among other cities, most of the GWF events are being held at their homebase in Germany.

Aide the monthly events, the German Wrestling Federation also runs a wrestling school in Berlin-Neukölln since 1997. The most famous graduates of this school include Axel Tischer, Ilja Dragunov (who was trained by Tischer), Wesna Busic, Blue Nikita, Jazzy Gabert and Lucky Kid.

== History ==
The German Wrestling Federation was founded under the name "Graefe Wrestling Federation" by Ahmed Chaer and Crazy Sexy Mike (Hussen Chaer) and their friends, who lived in the Graefestrasse in Berlin-Neukölln. They quickly changed their name to "German Wrestling Federation", following the example of the World Wrestling Entertainment. The first show called "GWF Winter Slam" took place in December 1995.

The GWF Training School was founded two years later in order to train young people who could compete in the shows. The school still exists today and is coached by Ahmed Chaer and Crazy Sexy Mike as well as Orlando Silver, who started his career as a Luchador in Mexico before moving to Berlin. In 2011 an offshoot of the school was also founded in Dresden. The trainer there was Alexander Wolfe, who trained Ilja Dragunov among others.

== Growth and cooperation ==
In 2010, the German Wrestling Federation worked closely with German Stampede Wrestling (GSW) Thus, the German Wrestling Federation functioned as a development territory and training school of GSW. However, after GSW closed down, the German Wrestling Federation started to hold events on their own again.

There were also cooperation shows with other wrestling promotions. For example in 2015 with westside Xtreme Wrestling or in 2003 with Athletik Club Weinheim. In 2017 GWF collaborated with WhatCulture Pro Wrestling and jointly organized the German qualifying tournament for the Pro Wrestling World Cup in Berlin, which was ultimately won by Kushida later that year.

== Expansion ==
In October 2011 the show "GWF Berlin Wrestling Night 6" was held in the Statthaus Böcklerpark, attracting more than 300 spectators. After the December event, the German Wrestling Federation moved to the "shake", a circus tent at Berlin Ostbahnhof. From then on, the GWF and its events were part of the Berlin party scene and the regular events were always completely sold out.

In addition, in 2014 the GWF started to organize events in Hennigsdorf (GWF Next Step) and in Waren an der Müritz. Other regular locations were Oberhausen, Bad Ems, Lübeck, Hagen, Kiel, Hamburg, Rostock, Herne and Andernach.

After the shows at shake were always completely sold out, GWF was looking for a new home and from 2015 on, the GWF moved to Huxley's Neue Welt - which is not only a well-known concert arena in Berlin, but also a traditional wrestling hall. Traditional wrestling tournaments were held here in the 1970s. In 2017 GWF also held an open-air event at Zitadelle Spandau, where several internationally renowned wrestlers like Christopher Daniels, Drago, Bram, Carlito and Chris Masters competed. In the main event of the show Moose lost the GWF World Title against Pascal Spalter.

In 2019 the GWF moved to Festsaal Kreuzberg, where up to 600 spectators regularly attend the monthly shows.

== Tournaments, special events and miscellaneous ==
In 2016 the GWF organized for the first time the event called "GWF Battlefield", which copies the match principle of the Royal Rumble. The winner receives a chance to challenge for the GWF World Championship at the following GWF Anniversary show at the end of the year. Among the most famous winners of the last years are Bram, Angélico. and Axel Tischer.

Also in 2016 the GWF started to promote all-female events under the banner "GWF Women's Wrestling Revolution". During these events the Progress Women's Championship was defended for the first time in Germany, when Toni Storm defeated Wesna Busic at GWF Revolution 8 in May 2018 at the first-ever all-female evening event in German history.

In 2017 the GWF started to create a YouTube series called "GWF Who's Next" which was designed like a casting show where rookies from the GWF Training School and other countries presented their characters and had matches in front of a jury consisting of legends (like Ulf Herman, Doug Williams and Al Snow) and current GWF superstars. The first season was won by Hungarian wrestler Benji, while the second season was won by GWF trainee Onur Dağlar. The third season was focussed on all-female talents from all over the World but couldn't conclude due to the ongoing corona crisis.

In 2017 and 2018 the German Wrestling Federation released two seasons of a self-produced series called "GWF Three Count" which is available for free on YouTube and Amazon Prime and is a mixture of a daily soap and a traditional wrestling show.

In 2018, the GWF introduced the GWF Light Heavyweight World Cup, in which eight wrestlers from eight different nations compete against each other in one tournament. The winners of the four preliminary round duels meet in a 4-way match in a final. Among others Tucker, Kenny Williams, Jonny Storm and Matt Cross competed here. The tournaments were won by Angélico, in 2018, El Phantasmo in 2019, Tarkan Aslan in 2020, Crowchester in 2022, Aytac Bahar in 2023 and Ahura in 2024.

In 2018 the German Wrestling Federation launched a subscription-based video streaming service called WeAreGWF.com where the viewers can watch all of the events since 2016 with German and English commentary. Since 2019, GWF offers all of their main shows as free live streams on YouTube or as VOD on the platform.

== Championships and accomplishments ==
=== Current championships ===
Championship	Current champion(s)	Reign	Date won	Days held	Location	Notes	Ref.
GWF World Championship	Rotten Moodo	1	November 1, 2026	5	Berlin, Germany	Defeated Ahura at Legacy 31 in Moodo's Chaos Key Championship match	
GWF Berlin Championship	Max Feifel	1	September 6, 2026	61	Berlin, Germany	Defeated Toni Harting at Battlefield.	
GWF Tag Team Championship	A Bite of Baklava (Aytaç Bahar and Joshua Amaru)	1 (3, 1)	November 1, 2026	5	Berlin, Germany	Defeated The Royal Throne (Sorani and Kourosh Bohemian) at Legacy 31.	
GWF Women's World Championship	Orsi	1	November 1, 2026	5	Berlin, Germany	Defeated previous champion Violet Nyte and Jane Nero in a three-way match at Legacy 31.	
GWF Mixed Tag Team Championship	Blutsbrüder (Georg Asgolar and Nero)	1	April 19, 2026	201	Berlin, Germany	Defeated The Royal Throne (Sorani and Sultan Suzu) at Summer Smash.	

=== Former championships ===
Championship	Final champion	Reign	Date won	Location	Notes	Ref.
GWF Loserweight Title	Orlando Silver	1	July 17, 2022	Berlin, Germany	Lost to Feyyaz Aguila at Chaos City 6.	

== Notes ==
1.The concept of the GWF Loserweight Titles says that the wearer is the worst wrestler of the German Wrestling Federation. The title is therefore also called the title of shame. To "get rid" of the title, the wearer has to win a fight. With this he passes the title on to the loser.

== See also ==
- List of professional wrestling promotions in Europe
