= List of professional wrestling promotions in Europe =

This is a list of professional wrestling promotions in Europe, sorted by country, and lists both active and defunct professional wrestling promotions.

== All of Europe ==
Name	Location	Owner(s)	Years active	Website	Notes
Active
New European Championship Wrestling	Nuremberg	Alex Wright	2009–	Yes	
Union of European Wrestling Alliances			2009–		Governing body

== Europe ==
=== Austria ===
Name	Location	Owner(s)	Years active	Website	Notes
Active
European Wrestling Association	Vienna	Chris Raaber; Michael Kovac	2002–	Yes	
Defunct
Catch Wrestling Association	Graz	Nico Selenkowitsch (1973-1987); Otto Wanz (1987-2000); Peter William (1987-2000)	1973–2000	Yes	Originally known as the Internationalen Berufsringer Verbandes (IBV)

=== Belgium ===
Name	Location	Owner(s)	Years active	Website	Notes
Active
Banger Zone Wrestling	Frameries		2019–	Yes	
Belgian Catch Wrestling Federation	Liège	Salvatore Bellomo	2006–	Yes	Associated with Belgian Wrestling School
Flemish Wrestling force	Tessenderlo	Homeless tom	2003-	yes	

=== Croatia ===
Name	Location	Owner(s)	Years active	Website	Notes
Active
Prvi Hrvatski Kečeri	Zagreb	Antonio Ilić	2005–	Yes	First Croatian promotion

=== Cyprus ===
Name	Location	Owner(s)	Years active	Website	Notes
Active
Pro Wrestling Cyprus (PWC)	Nicosia		2023-	Yes	Wrestling promotion that started as part of Cyprus Comic Con
Absolute Cyprus Wrestling (ACW)	Nicosia	Frixos Masouras	2024-	Yes	Purely Cypriot pro-wrestling promotion

=== Denmark ===
Name	Location	Owner(s)	Years active	Website	Notes
Active
BODYSLAM! Pro Wrestling	Aarhus	Kristian Buus Nielsen; Søren Bjerg Nielsen	2015–	Yes	
Copenhagen Championship Wrestling	Copenhagen	Sebastian Krohn Børgesen	2016–		Union of European Wrestling Alliances member.
	Randers	Kim Tinning	2004–	Yes	Originally known as Danish Wrestling from 2004 to 2008. Union of European Wrestling Alliances member.
Nordic Elite Wrestling	Copenhagen	Crazy 8	2021–	Yes	
Defunct
Premier Wrestling League		European Sports Promotion Ltd.	2007–2009		
Wrestling DK	Fredericia		2011–2016		

=== Finland ===
Name	Location	Owner(s)	Years active	Website	Notes
Active
FCF Wrestling	Helsinki	Pro Wrestling Ry	2003–	Yes	
Slam Wrestling Finland	Porvoo	StarBuck	2018–	Yes	
Defunct
Valhalla Pro Wrestling	Helsinki	Patrick Pesola	2003–2005		

=== France ===
Name	Location	Owner(s)	Years active	Website	Notes
Active
Association Beauvaisienne de Catch et Athlétisme	Beauvais	M. Villeroy; M. Queval; Jean-Claude Grignon; Olivier Grignon	1956–1966; 1966–1970; 1970–1985; 1985–	Yes	Oldest ever-running pro wrestling school and promotion in France
Association Biterroise de Catch	Béziers	Max Soulié; Rémy Soulié	2006–	Yes	Union of European Wrestling Alliances member.
Association les Professionnels du Catch	Nanterre	Fausto Costantino; Fabio Costantino	2004–2019; 2019–	Yes	
La Bagarre	Ploudalmézeau		2022–		
Catch As Catch Can	Douai		2017–		
Catch ConneXion	Montpellier; Perpignan	Nicolas Broisseau; Yannick Roussel	2008–	Yes	
Fighters Revenge Pro Wrestling	Pessac	André Levissieux	2011–2018; 2022–	Yes	
Hexagon Catch	Montpellier		2022–		
International Catch Wrestling Alliance	Laventie	Pierre Fontaine	2002–	Yes	
Khao	Paris		2025–	Yes	
Ligue Nationale de Catch	Remiremont	Drommer Ludovic; Xavier Christen	2010–	Yes	
Lyon Wrestling Association	Lyon		2025–	Yes	
Nevez Web Catch	Brest		2015–		
North France Wrestling	Gravelines		2024–		
Rixe Catch	Mordelles	Albert Roche	2019–		
Tigers Pro Wrestling	Narbonne	Marc Sébire; Danielle Picout	2010–2014; 2014–		
Wrestling Pro Essonne	Corbeil-Essonnes	David Stars	2018–		
Wrestling Stars	Montereau	Flesh Gordon	2002–	Yes	
Defunct
AYA Catch	Rumilly	Stéphane Nogues	2015–2024	Yes	
European Wrestling League Championship	Mérignac	Frédéric Juste	2007–2021	Yes	
Fédération Française de Catch Professionnel	Paris; Wissous	Henri Deglane; Roger Delaporte; Marc Mercier	1933; 1960–1989; 2006–2025	Yes	Oldest pro wrestling promotion in France
Fighting Spirit Federation	Toulouse	Laurent Pourrut; Jerome Pourrut; Sacha Puyssegur	2005–2007	Yes	
Force Francophone du Catch	Toulouse	Matthias Chalumeau	2004–2010	Yes	
Heritage Catch Professionnel	Bollène	William Wolf	2020–2026		
N'Catch	Tourcoing	Ludivine Hugot; Philippe de Marsignac	2009–2013	Yes	
Ouest-Catch	Lamballe	Régis Béreschel	2011–2019	Yes	
Queens of Chaos	Toulouse	Jerome Pourrut	2005–2007	Yes	

=== Germany ===
Name	Location	Owner(s)	Years active	Website	Notes
Active
German Championship Wrestling	Bremen	Dennis Broszinski	2022-		
German Wrestling Federation	Berlin	Ahmed Chaer, Crazy Sexy Mike	1995–	Yes	
New European Championship Wrestling	Nuremberg	Alex Wright	2009–	Yes	
Unlimited Wrestling	Halberstadt	Martin Guerrero	2019-	Yes	
Verband der Berufsringer	Berlin		1912–2005		Oldest known wrestling promotion in the world.
Westside Xtreme Wrestling	Essen	wXw Europe GmbH; Felix Kohlenberg, Tassilo Jung, Jörg Steinmetzler, Christian Michael Jakobi	2000–	Yes	

=== Greece ===
Name	Location	Owner(s)	Years active	Website	Notes
Active
ZMAK	Athens	Petros Polychronidis 2016-2026 (Retired) George Charos 2026-Active	2016–	zmakgr.com	
Defunct
T.W.T. (Thessaloniki Wrestling Team)	Thessaloniki	George Charos	2016-2018	https://twt982.webnode.gr/	
Hellenic Pro Wrestling Association	Athens	HPWA Board	2018-2022		
Greek Wrestling House	Athens & Tripoli	George Konstas	2021–		This is not an actual Wrestling Promotion, it is a Youtube channel.
Greek Wrestling Association	Athens	Anonymous General Manager	2022– 2023		This is not an actual Wrestling Promotion, it is a Youtube channel.

=== Hungary ===
Name	Location	Owner(s)	Years active	Website	Notes
Active
Hungarian Championship Wrestling	Budapest	Aaron Kiss; David Turger; Ben Szalay	2010–	Yes	
Xtreme Wrestling Promotion	Salgótarján	Ron Corvus	2019–	Yes	
Defunct
Pro-Wrestling Magyarország	Budapest	Kirill Michurin †	2016–2020		

=== Italy ===
Name	Location	Owner(s)	Years active	Website	Notes
Active
Italian Championship Wrestling	Bergamo	Nino Baldan Emilio Bernocchi	2000–	Yes	Oldest Italian wrestling promotion still active
Superior Italian Wrestling	Cascina (Pisa)	Alex Flash	2018-	Yes	Most-followed Italian promotion, with a weekly YouTube show and two yearly big events
Milano Wrestling	Milan	Gaetano Durante	2019–	Yes	
Wrestling Torino	Turin	Violenzo	2023–	Yes	
DREAM Pro Wrestling	Salerno	Max Peach	2021-		
BREAK Pro Wrestling	Roma	Andrea Ballarin	2022-		
Squash A Jobber	Milan				
Italian Wrestling Association	Frosinone				

=== Malta ===
Name	Location	Owner(s)	Years active	Website	Notes
Active
Pro Wrestling Malta	Malta	Wayne Pace	2014–	Yes	First Maltese promotion

Czech Republic

Name	Location	Owner(s)	Years active	Website	Notes
Active
Art of Wrestling	Prague	Michal Petrgal	2016–	Yes	
VcV Original Wrestling	Prague	VcV Original Wrestling	2012–	Yes	First Czech promotion

=== Netherlands ===
Name	Location	Owner(s)	Years active	Website	Notes
Active
Dutch Pro Wrestling	Hazerswoude-Rijndijk	Mark Kodiak	2004-	yes	
Pro Wrestling Holland	wormer	Jordy te Braak	2006-	yes	
Live Action Wrestling		Rico Bushido	2023-		
Defunct
Freestyle Championship Wrestling		Bas Jussen	1997 - 2011	no	
Pro Wrestling Showdown			2004-2019	no	

=== Poland ===
Name	Location	Owner(s)	Years active	Website	Notes
Active
Maniac Zone Wrestling	Wrocław	Shadow	2014–		
Kombat Pro Wrestling	Gdynia	Piękny Kawaler	2015–	Yes	KPW was created in the place of Do or Die Wrestling, which ceased operations in 2015
PpW Ewenement Wrestling	Warsaw	Mister Z	2020–	Yes	Started as a backyard wrestling promotion in 2010, transitioned into pro wrestling in 2020
Prime Time Wrestling	Kozłów	Arkadiusz "Pan" Pawłowski; Łukasz "Prezes" Okoński	2021–	Yes	
Legacy of Wrestling	Katowice	Legacy of Wrestling	2024-		
Defunct
Do or Die Wrestling	Gdańsk	Don Roid	2009–2015		First Polish promotion
Total Blast Wrestling	Poland	Total Blast Wrestling	2009–2011		

=== Portugal ===
Name	Location	Owner(s)	Years active	Website	Notes
Active
Portugal Wrestlefest	Lisbon	João Ribeiro, Luís Manuel, Nelson Pereira	2022–	Yes	

=== Spain ===
Name	Location	Owner(s)	Years active	Website	Notes
Defunct
Corporación Internacional de Catch	Madrid; Barcelona		1930s-1975		Dominant Spanish wrestling promotion of the 20th century
Los Colosos del Ring	Madrid	Victor Castilla (formerly wrestler "Quasimodo")	1974-1986		Promoted World Welterweight Championship match, March 1983 on TVE2's "Estudio abierto"
Luchadores Independientes de Europa			c.1991-1996		Revivalist promotion, formed in response to WWF's early 1990s success in Spain.

=== Ukraine ===
Name	Location	Owner(s)	Years active	Website	Notes
Active
Ukrainian Wrestling Arena	Kyiv	Kostiantyn Perlov	2016–		

== See also ==
- List of professional wrestling attendance records in Europe
- List of women's wrestling promotions
- List of professional wrestling promotions in South America
