= Teoman (wrestler) =

German–Turkish professional wrestler (born 1993)

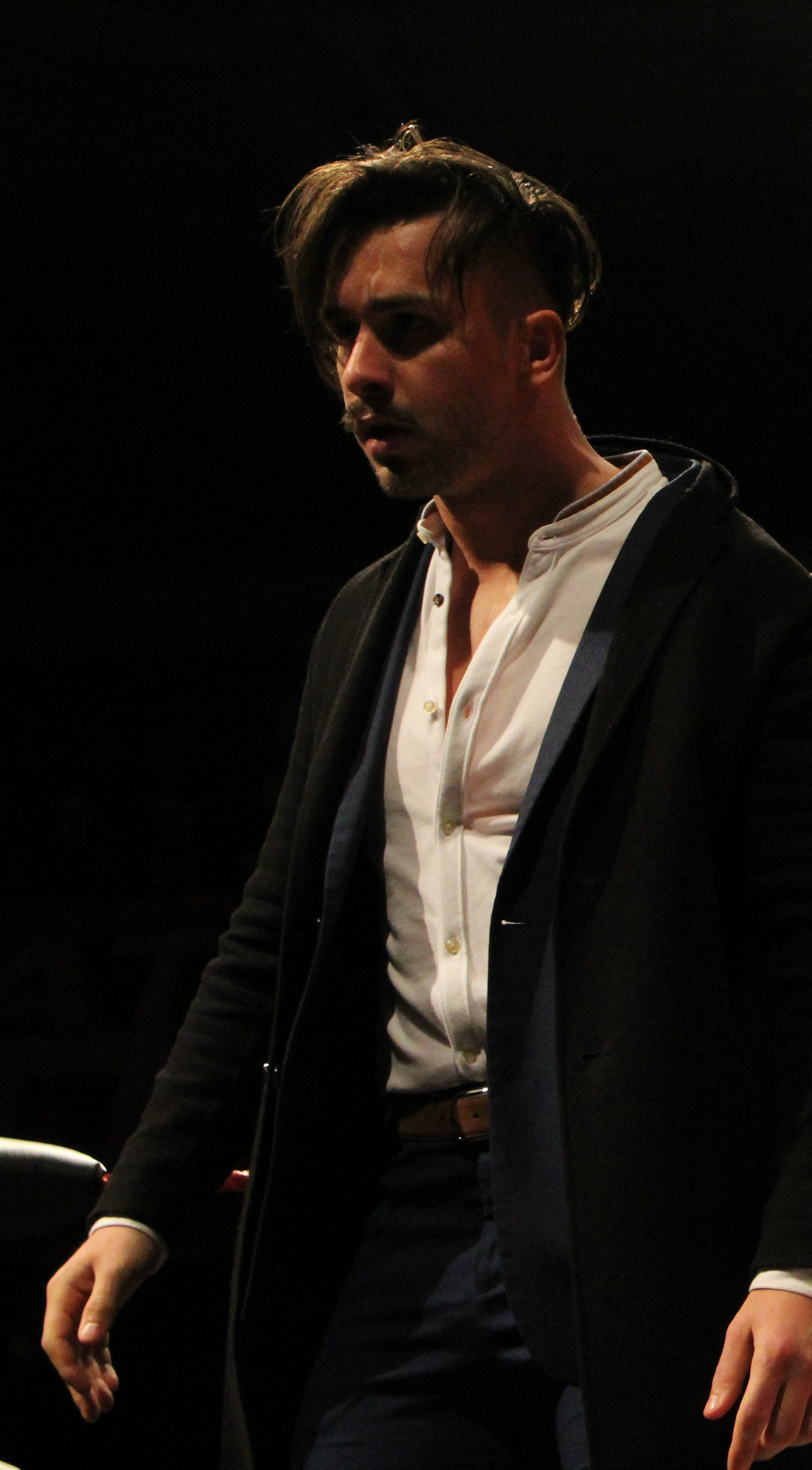
- Teoman in March 2020

Personal information
- Born: Metehan Kocabaşoğlu; 4 March 1993 (age 33) Berlin, Germany

Professional wrestling career
- Ring name(s): Hakan Aslan; Lucky Kid; Metehan; Teoman
- Billed height: 6 ft 0 in (1.83 m)
- Billed weight: 180 lb (82 kg)
- Trained by: Ahmed Chaer; Crazy Sexy Mike; Ikuto Hidaka; Wesna
- Debut: 28 June 2008

Metehan Kocabaşoğlu (born 4 March 1993) is a German professional wrestler of Turkish descent, currently performing for German Wrestling Federation (GWF) under his first name (stylized as Metehan), where he is the former two-times GWF World Champion and is a former four-time GWF Tag Team Champion. He is best known for his tenure in WWE, where he performed on the NXT UK brand under the ring name Teoman as well as his time at Westside Xtreme Wrestling (wXw) where he won the prestigious 16 Carat Gold Tournament in 2019. He also competed in the PWG Battle of Los Angeles.

He worked with wXw under the ring name Lucky Kid and under his birth name Metehan. His accomplishments include being a one-time wXw Shotgun Champion, a one-time wXw World Tag Team Champion and the winner of 16 Carat Gold.

== Professional wrestling career ==
=== Early career (2008–2015) ===
Kocabaşoğlu initially aspired to be a professional footballer, but after sustaining a knee injury, he was forced to give it up. A friend of his, Cem Kaplan, told him about the professional wrestling school at the German Wrestling Federation (GWF), so he trained to become a professional wrestler, making his debut in 2008. He would go on to team with Kaplan in German Stampede Wrestling (GSW), and had greater success with Tarkan Aslan, as The Young Lions, winning multiple tag team championships across the country. Billed as Aslan's storyline brother, he was nicknamed The Lucky Kid, which later became his ring name.

=== Westside Xtreme Wrestling (2015–2021, 2022–2023) ===
In 2015, the Young Lions began making regular appearances in wXw, and upon their return in May 2017, they won the wXw World Tag Team Championship, aligning themselves with a new heel stable, Rise. Their reign lasted until November, as they failed to advance to the finals of the World Tag Team League. Rise eventually split into two factions, and Lucky aligned himself with the faces. Lucky would be involved in title shots for the wXw Shotgun Championship for much of the year, but in August 2018, Aslan turned his back on him. In autumn title matches against Marius Al-Ani, Aslan and Da Mack interfered on separate occasions, costing Lucky the match. This led to both factions facing off against each with the titles on the line, at Back to the Roots, which resulted in a win for the faces. At wXw 16 Carat Gold, Lucky defeated Ringkampf's Timothy Thatcher and Axel Dieter Jr., and 2017 winner Ilja Dragunov on his way to the final, before gaining an upset victory over Walter. He would remain a member of Rise until September 2019, as his match at Du Entscheidest with stablemate Pete Bouncer went to a no contest, and later in the night, Bouncer and Ivan Kiev made their mark in the tag division. In October, he began teaming with Kyle Fletcher as wXw's official representatives of Schadenfreude, a stable that originated in Fight Club: Pro (FCP). In 2020, Lucky was defeated in the first round of wXw 16 Carat Gold, and turned heel on night three, changing his ring name to his birth name, while introducing a new stable, Ezel, alongside Grup Anarsi (Abdul Kenan and Aytac Bahar).

On 30 May episode of Shotgun, Metehan explained the change in character, as it was necessary to provide for his family, especially his mother who was sick. He was also shown to have a short temper, due to being frustrated over Abdul and Aytac's performances in the ring. During July, he participated in a tournament for the vacant Shotgun Championship, and defeated Hektor Invictus in the final to win his first singles title in wXw. At a show in Kutenholz, Avalanche goaded Metehan into accepting a title shot by insulting his mother; Metehan defeated him later that night. The same tactic was used by Killer Kelly (who was the #1 contender for the Shotgun Championship) on 10 October episode of Shotgun, as he had no intention of hitting a woman, but since Kelly brought his mother into it, he had to defend her honour again, and quickly defeated Kelly by submission. Since wXw's return in the summer, Ezel and Die Raucherpause had come to an agreement that neither stable would interfere in each other's business, with Norman Harras often acting as the middleman. However, Metehan and Bobby Gunns were selected in the same block of the Catch Grand Prix, and would face each other in the final match. In his opening block match, Metehan was defeated by Cara Noir, when he flew into a rage after the Englishman used the taunt of his previous character against him. Over the course of the tournament, he went on to win his next four matches. The final block match between Metehan and Gunns resulted in a double disqualification, and although he tied the block alongside Noir with nine points, the opening match loss proved to be crucial and Noir made the final. On 31 December, at Silvester Spezial, Metehan was set to face an unknown challenger. Norman Harras found out that director of sports Absolute Andy was out of the country at a fitness camp, so he hacked into Andy's iPad, and sent a e-mail to the board of directors, booking himself as the challenger for the Shotgun Championship. Andy soon learnt that his iPad had been hacked, and interrupted the match by video, to add a stipulation that the loser would be fined €5,000. With that threat looming over them, Harras eventually defeated Metehan, ending his reign at 154 days.

=== WWE (2021–2022) ===
On 29 January 2021, it was reported that Kocabaşoğlu had signed a contract with WWE, where he will perform on the NXT UK brand. A series of vignettes hyping his debut began on the 25 February episode of NXT UK, and on 4 March, his ring name on the brand was revealed to be Teoman. He made his debut on 11 March episode of NXT UK as a villain, defeating Danny Jones. On 24 June episode of NXT UK, Teoman defeated Oliver Carter and was joined by Rohan Raja, who stomped on Carter and aligned himself with Teoman. On 15 July episode of NXT UK, he teamed with Raja to defeat Carter and Ashton Smith in a tag team match. In September, Teoman competed in a tournament to determine the number one contender to the NXT UK Heritage Cup, defeating Nathan Frazer in the first round but lost to Wolfgang in the semifinals. He started a feud with Gallus on 28 October episode of NXT UK, when Raja lost to Mark Coffey and both of them attacked him and Wolfgang. On 18 November episode of NXT UK, Teoman and Raja defeated them in a tag team match, after a distraction from Charlie Dempsey attacking Joe Coffey. On 2 December episode of NXT UK, Raja (with Teoman on the phone) accepted Dempsey into their group, officially dubbed "Die Familie."

On 27 January 2022 episode of NXT UK, Die Familie defeated Gallus in a six-man tag team match. Afterwards, Nathan Frazer questioned Teoman on why he was keeping Rohan Raja and Charlie Dempsey to protect him. The following week, they attacked Frazer in the parking lot, leading to a match on 10 February episode of NXT UK where Frazer defeated Teoman. On 14 April episode of NXT UK, Teoman defeated A-Kid. On 19 May episode of NXT UK, Teoman and Raja defeated Dave Mastiff and Jack Starz in a tag team title eliminator match, and were added into the NXT UK Tag Team Championship match involving the champions Moustache Mountain (Trent Seven and Tyler Bate) and the team of Ashton Smith and Oliver Carter. On 2 June episode of NXT UK, they failed to win the titles when Smith pinned Seven. On 23 June episode of NXT UK, Die Familie had another shot at the tag titles after Smith and Carter vacated them, but failed to win a Fatal 4-Way elimination match after Raja was pinned by eventual winners Brooks Jensen and Josh Briggs.

On 18 August 2022, Teoman was released from his WWE contract.

== Championships and accomplishments ==
- Baltic Championship Wrestling
  - BCW Tag Team Championship (1 time) – with Tarkan Aslan
- Championship Of Wrestling
  - cOw Tag Team Championship (1 time, inaugural) – with Tarkan Aslan
- Deutsche Wrestling Allianz
  - DWA Tag Team Championship (1 time) – with Tarkan Aslan
- Eurowrestling-Company
  - EW-COM Tag Team Championship (1 time) – with Tarkan Aslan
- German Wrestling Federation
  - GWF World Championship (2 times)
  - GWF Berlin Championship (1 time)
  - GWF Amateur Berlin Championship (1 time) – with Tarkan Aslan
  - GWF Tag Team Championship (4 times) – Tarkan Aslan (3), Axel Tischer (1)
  - European Tag Team Tournament (2016) – with Tarkan Aslan
  - Golden Chance (2020)
- Hungarian Championship Wrestling
  - HCW Tag Team Championship (1 time) – with Tarkan Aslan
- Mad Wrestling Association
  - MWA Tag Team Championship (1 time) – with Tarkan Aslan
- Thats Awesome Wrestling
  - TAW Championship (1 time, inaugural, current)
  - TAW Championship Tournament (2025)
- Pro Wrestling Illustrated
  - Ranked No. 387 of the top 500 singles wrestlers in the PWI 500 in 2019
- Westside Xtreme Wrestling
  - wXw Shotgun Championship (1 time)
  - wXw Shotgun Title Tournament (2020)
  - 16 Carat Gold Tournament (2019)
  - wXw World Tag Team Championship (1 time) – with Tarkan Aslan
- YAWARA
  - Yawara Championship (2 times)
- Eastside Revolution Wrestling
  - ERW Championship (1 time)
