= Emil Sitoci =

Dutch professional wrestler

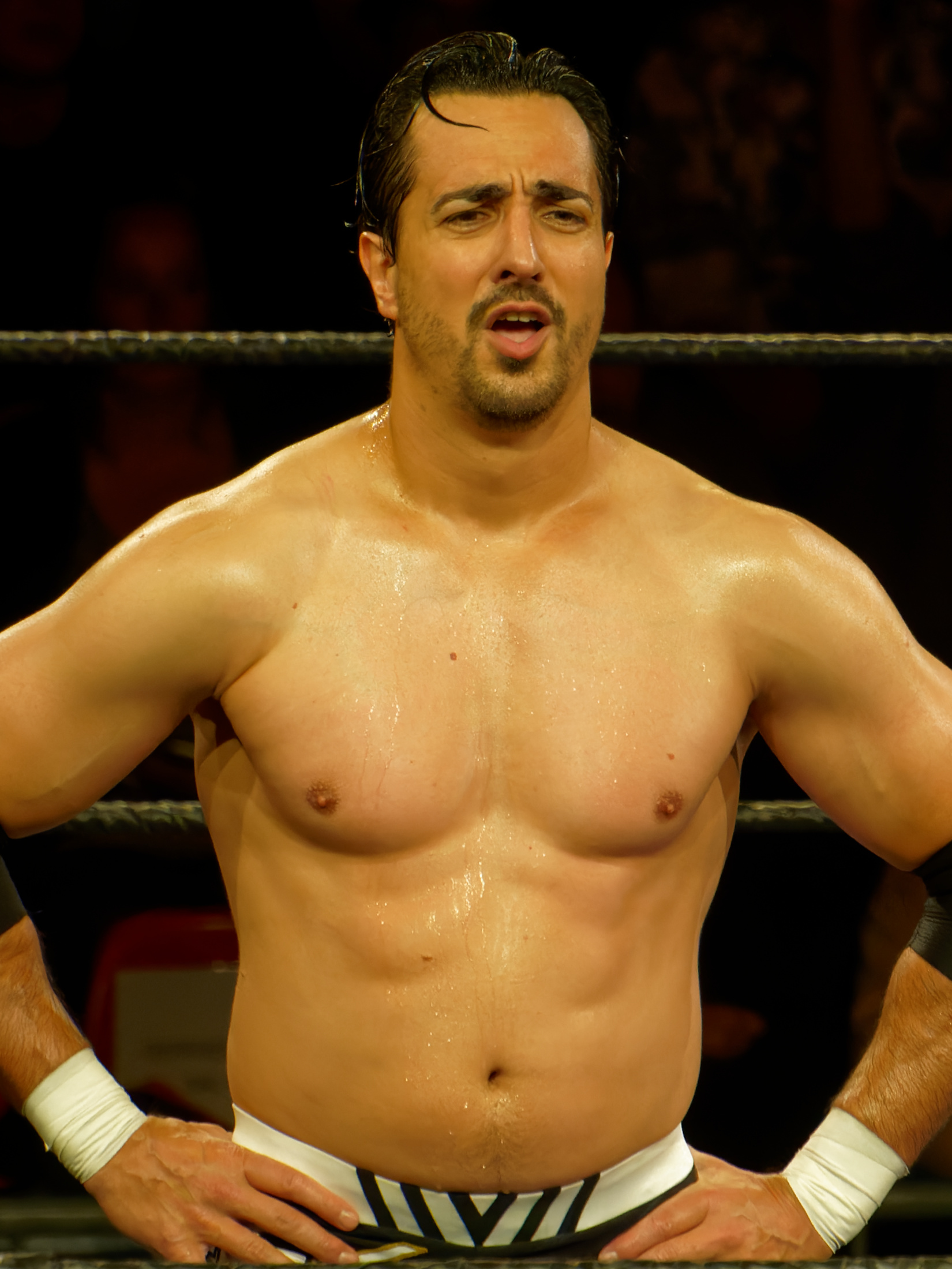
- Sitoci in October 2024

Personal information
- Born: May 17, 1985 (age 41) Ede, Netherlands

Professional wrestling career
- Ring name(s): Emil Sitoci; Das Nihilist; Luchadore Sitoci; Little Rider; Klaus Kessler
- Billed height: 6 ft 1 in (1.85 m)
- Billed weight: 207 lb (94 kg)
- Trained by: Bas Van Kunder; Chris Hero; Dave Finlay; Ian Rotten; Mike Quackenbush; Salvatore Bellomo; Jorge Rivera
- Debut: 2001

Emil Sitoci (born May 17, 1985) is a Dutch professional wrestler and television personality, He is best known for his work in German professional wrestling promotion Westside Xtreme Wrestling.

== Professional wrestling career ==
Sitoci started his career in 2001, wrestling under a mask, in mainland European wrestling promotions. In 2003 he travelled to America as an exchange student, which enabled him to stay for a full year and train under Chris Hero. By 2004 Sitoci had dropped the mask and was given the nickname "Tremendous". During this time, he competed in companies such as IWA Mid-South, CZW and Chikara. In 2005 he returned to CZW to challenge Mike Quackenbush for the CZW World Junior Heavyweight Championship in the ECW Arena.

Upon returning to Europe, Sitoci achieved success in Germany in Westside Xtreme Wrestling by capturing the wXw World Lightweight Championship from Jonny Storm. Sitoci went on to defend against the likes of Matt Sydal, El Generico and PAC before losing the title in 2006. In 2008 he recaptured the title for a second time by defeating Zack Sabre Jr. in the finals of an 8-man tournament in Oberhausen, Germany.

Throughout 2009 and 2010, Sitoci stayed active on the European wrestling scene, regularly in Austria, Belgium, Engeland, France, Ireland, Italy, Netherlands, Norway and Switzerland. In November 2010 Sitoci made Steve Corino tap out to the Fujiwara Armbar to become the German Stampede Wrestling Heavyweight Champion. In the same month he was also seen in a short appearance WWE Smackdown, where he was attacked by Kane. in April 2011, Sitoci was part of an American wXw tour, where he came up victorious in a 4-way match against Brandon Gatson, Chuck Taylor and Johnny Gargano on iPPV.

Sitoci returned to America in October 2011 as part of Jeff Katz's Wrestling Revolution Project in Hollywood, where he was cast to portray a German nihilist.

On November 6, 2012, Sitoci became the third Dutchman, after Hans Mortier and Wim Ruska, to compete in a WWE ring. He lost to Jack Swagger in a dark match prior to WWE SmackDown tapings in Birmingham.

On January 25, 2013, Sitoci made his debut for Japanese promotion Wrestling New Classic in Tokyo, defeating Yusuke Kodama in a singles match. Two days later, he picked up another win over Koji Doi. Afterwards, Sitoci joined WNC's top heel stable Synapse. However, in Sitoci's first match as a member of Synapse on February 28, he turned on the stable's leader, Akira, costing him and Syuri their six-person tag team match against Makoto, Tajiri and Zeus, and afterwards challenged him to a match for the WNC Championship. Sitoci received his title shot on March 31, but was defeated by Akira.

== Personal life ==
Sitoci is a graduate of the Utrecht University. He earned his Master's Degree in Media Studies in 2010, specializing in film and television sciences. He has been featured on a large variety of television shows in The Netherlands. In 2008 he starred in a Dutch variation of BBC's Last Man Standing, called Hollandse Krijgers. The show was centered around 5 athletes who had to live with native African tribes for 8 straight weeks, and compete in local sports such as wrestling and stick fighting. Sitoci ended up tying a kickboxer for the win in the series finale.

In 2012 Emil was the central figure in an episode of The World of Beau, In which he was described as "the best wrestler in the Netherlands." In this episode he trains presenter Beau van Erven Dorens on his debut in the ring. Sitoci has a Master Training Film and Television Studies degree from the University of Utrecht.

In early 2013 he has done behind the scenes working as an editor for the BNN program "Proefkonijnen".

Currently Emil is working on a new reality show by John de Mol (creator of Big Brother and The Voice) called Utopia. It’s about building up a new society from scratch, with no laws and no rules.

== Championships and accomplishments ==
- Dutch Pro Wrestling
  - Dutch Heavyweight Championship (1 time)
- Freestyle Championship Wrestling
  - FCW Heavyweight Championship (1 time)
  - FCW Lightweight Championship (1 time)
- German Stampede Wrestling
  - GSW Breakthrough Championship (1 time)
  - GSW Tag Team Championship (1 time) – with Steve Douglas
  - GSW World Heavyweight Championship (1 time)
- Pro Wrestling Allstars
  - PWA European Allstar Championship (1 time)
- Pro Wrestling Holland
  - PWH Heavyweight Championship (1 time)
- Pro Wrestling Showdown
  - PWS Heavyweight Championship (1 time)
- Westside Xtreme Wrestling
  - wXw Hardcore Championship (1 time)
  - wXw Shotgun Championship (2 times)
  - wXw World Lightweight Championship (2 times)
- Other achievements
  - Dragonhearts Championship (1 time)
