= Royal Quest (2019) =

2019 New Japan Pro-Wrestling event

- Promotional poster featuring Kota Ibushi, Zack Sabre Jr., Will Ospreay, Hiroshi Tanahashi, Kazuchika Okada and Tetsuya Naito
- Promotion: New Japan Pro-Wrestling
- Date: 31 August 2019
- City: London, England
- Venue: Copper Box Arena
- Attendance: 6,119

Event chronology
← Previous; G1 Climax 29; Super J-Cup	Next → Road to Destruction

Royal Quest chronology
← Previous; First	Next → II

Royal Quest was a professional wrestling pay-per-view event produced by New Japan Pro-Wrestling (NJPW). It was the inaugural Royal Quest event and took place on 31 August 2019 at the Copper Box Arena in London, England and was streamed live on FITE TV. It was the first-ever event independently promoted by NJPW in the United Kingdom.

Eight matches were contested at the event. In the main event, Kazuchika Okada retained the IWGP Heavyweight Championship against Minoru Suzuki. Hiroshi Tanahashi defeated Zack Sabre Jr. to win the British Heavyweight Championship, Kenta defeated Tomohiro Ishii to win the NEVER Openweight Championship, and the Guerrillas of Destiny retained the IWGP Tag Team Championship against Aussie Open – the winners of Revolution Pro Wrestling's Road to Royal Quest tournament.

== Production ==
=== Background ===
Royal Quest was the first-ever professional wrestling event independently promoted by NJPW in the United Kingdom. It was the first UK event produced by NJPW after Strong Style Evolved UK on 30 June – 1 July 2018 (in partnership with Revolution Pro Wrestling).

The event was streamed live on FITE TV and made available for on demand viewing on NJPW World in September.

On 17 July, Revolution Pro Wrestling announced the Road to Royal Quest tag team tournament, to be held during the month of August. It would include eight teams, with the winners challenging the IWGP Tag Team Champions Guerrillas of Destiny (Tama Tonga and Tanga Loa) at Royal Quest. Aussie Open (Kyle Fletcher and Mark Davis) won the tournament, defeating the team of Josh Bodom and Sha Samuels in the final.

=== Storylines ===
Royal Quest featured professional wrestling matches that involved different wrestlers from pre-existing scripted feuds and storylines. Wrestlers portrayed villains, heroes or less distinguishable characters in the scripted events that built tension and culminate in a wrestling match or series of matches.

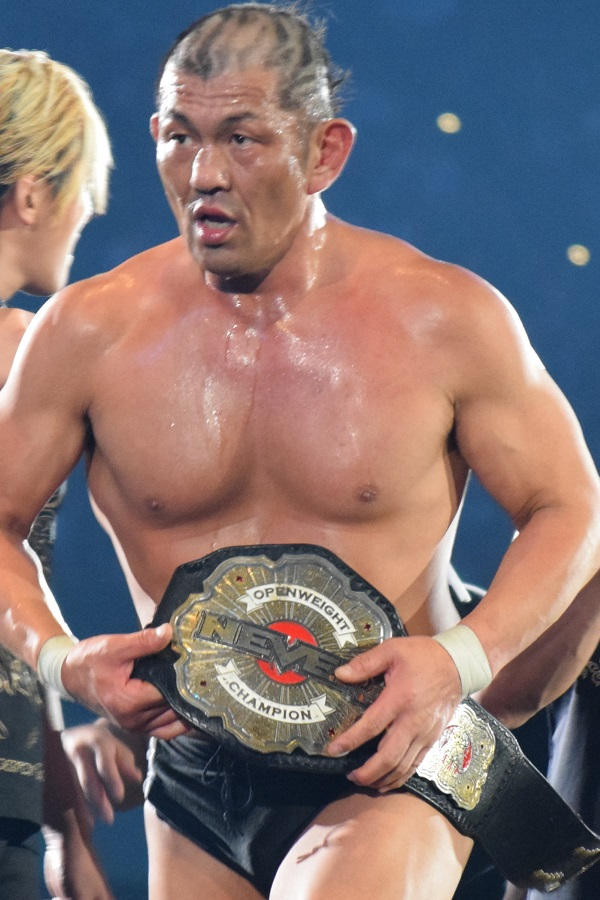
Minoru Suzuki, who challenged Kazuchika Okada for the IWGP Heavyweight Championship in the main event.

On 16 June, at Kizuna Road, the G1 Climax 29 tournament participants were announced and Minoru Suzuki was a notable absence. Suzuki ended up being a prominent part in the undercard matches of each G1 Climax 29 show, stating his anger towards the NJPW management in the press conferences. On 12 August, the tournament's last night, Suzuki pinned the IWGP Heavyweight Champion Kazuchika Okada in a tag team match (also involving Zack Sabre Jr. and Hiroshi Tanahashi) and challenged him to a championship match.

On 6 April, at G1 Supercard, Zack Sabre Jr. defeated Hiroshi Tanahashi to successfully retain the British Heavyweight Championship. Tanahashi ended up taking a two-month absence due to an injury to his left elbow suffered in the match. When the G1 Climax 29 blocks were announced, Tanahashi and Sabre were drawn in the same block. Their tournament match happened on 18 July, the fifth night, where Tanahashi avenged his injury by defeating Sabre. On 11 August, Tanahashi would again record a pinfall victory against Sabre – this time in an undercard eight-man tag team match – and therefore is challenging the British Heavyweight Champion at Sabre's request.

On 9 June, at Dominion 6.9 in Osaka-jo Hall, Katsuyori Shibata came to the ring accompanied by Kenta to announce the latter's inclusion in the G1 Climax 29 tournament at his request. Kenta would finish his block with eight points, failing to advance to the finals and drawing some unfriendly reactions from the Japanese audiences along the way. On 11 August, Tama Tonga revealed on Twitter that Bullet Club had recruited a new member. This was followed at the tournament's last night, on 12 August, when a Bullet Club team of Tama Tonga, Tanga Loa and Bad Luck Fale was scheduled to face Tomohiro Ishii, Yoshi-Hashi and Kenta in a six-man tag team match. Kenta refused to be tagged in and ended up hitting Ishii with the Go 2 Sleep and costing his team the match, officially joining Bullet Club in the process. Shibata would run into the ring to confront Kenta but was attacked instead by the other Bullet Club members. Therefore, Kenta is challenging Ishii for his NEVER Openweight Championship at this event.

== Event ==
Other on-screen personnel
Role:	Name:
Commentators	Kevin Kelly
Commentators	Gino Gambino
Commentators	Andy Boy Simmonz (ZSJ vs. Tanahashi)
Ring announcer	Slick Lombardo
Referees	Oscar Harding
Referees	Marty Asami
Referees	Red Shoes Unno

Royal Quest drew a near sellout crowd at the Copper Box Arena with 6,119 paid in attendance. In the U.K. there is no NJPW on television, so all interest was created online or through word of mouth. It was among the highest attended events for any non-televised promotion in the United Kingdom.

The event opened with Ryusuke Taguchi, Shota Umino and Ren Narita facing Roppongi 3K (Rocky Romero, Sho and Yoh). Sho won the match for his team with a lungblower, that he calls the Power Breaker, on Ren Narita.

Scheduled next was a tag team match between the team of Kota Ibushi and Juice Robinson and a Bullet Club team of Yujiro Takahashi and Hikuleo. Ibushi won the match for his team, performing the Kamigoye on Hikuleo.

The third match of the evening was a non-title match between the newly formed team of The Birds of Prey (Will Ospreay and Robbie Eagles) and the IWGP Junior Heavyweight Tag Team Champions, Taiji Ishimori and El Phantasmo of the Bullet Club. The Birds of Prey defeated the champions with Red Wing (a Spanish Fly off of the top rope) on Taiji Ishimori. After the match, Ospreay challenged Ishimori and Phantasmo to a future title match.

The fourth match saw a confrontation between the Los Ingobernables de Japón team of Tetsuya Naito and Sanada and the Bullet Club team of Jay White and Chase Owens. Sanada applied the Skull End on Owens to win the match via submission. The teams brawled in the ring after the match, with Naito standing tall after hitting Destino on White and obtaining a visual pinfall ahead of their future IWGP Intercontinental Championship match.

The fifth match was the first title match of the evening, as the Guerrillas of Destiny (Tama Tonga and Tanga Loa) faced off against RPW's Road to Royal Quest tournament winners Aussie Open (Kyle Fletcher and Mark Davis) in an IWGP Tag Team Championship match. Tonga and Loa retained their titles after hitting Fletcher with a Super Powerbomb.

After that, Tomohiro Ishii was scheduled to defend the NEVER Openweight Championship against the new Bullet Club member Kenta. During the match, his fellow stablemates Tama Tonga and Tanga Loa interfered, hitting a Magic Killer on Ishii. Kenta ended up winning the match and the title after hitting Ishii with his Go 2 Sleep patented move.

The co-main event was a British Heavyweight Championship defense, as Zack Sabre Jr. was looking to defend his title against Hiroshi Tanahashi in their fourth match of the calendar year. Tanahashi won the British Heavyweight Championship for the first time, after hitting Sabre with a High Fly Flow.

That led to the main event, where Kazuchika Okada was defending his IWGP Heavyweight Championship against the leader of Suzuki-gun, Minoru Suzuki. Okada defeated Suzuki with the Rainmaker after 33:25 minutes. Okada then closed the show with a promo, vowing to keep the title until the next time he returned to London.

== Results ==
No.	Results	Stipulations	Times
1	Roppongi 3K (Rocky Romero, Sho and Yoh) defeated Ryusuke Taguchi, Shota Umino and Ren Narita	Six-man tag team match	8:19
2	Kota Ibushi and Juice Robinson defeated Bullet Club (Yujiro Takahashi and Hikuleo)	Tag team match	8:46
3	Chaos (Will Ospreay and Robbie Eagles) defeated Bullet Club (Taiji Ishimori and El Phantasmo)	Tag team match	10:36
4	Los Ingobernables de Japón (Tetsuya Naito and Sanada) defeated Bullet Club (Jay White and Chase Owens) by submission	Tag team match	12:59
5	Guerrillas of Destiny (Tama Tonga and Tanga Loa) (c) (with Jado) defeated Aussie Open (Kyle Fletcher and Mark Davis)	Tag team match for the IWGP Tag Team Championship	12:56
6	Kenta defeated Tomohiro Ishii (c)	Singles match for the NEVER Openweight Championship	20:16
7	Hiroshi Tanahashi defeated Zack Sabre Jr. (c)	Singles match for the British Heavyweight Championship	17:39
8	Kazuchika Okada (c) defeated Minoru Suzuki	Singles match for the IWGP Heavyweight Championship	33:25
(c) / – the champion(s) heading into the match

=== Road to Royal Quest tournament brackets ===
Quarterfinals; Live at the Cockpit 44 (4 August)
Aussie Open (Kyle Fletcher and Mark Davis)	Pin
The Rascalz (Dezmond Xavier and Zachary Wentz)	16:05
Dan Moloney and MK McKinnan	Pin
Team WhiteWolf (A-Kid and Carlos Romo)	14:30
Gabriel Kidd and Shaun Jackson	Pin
Kenneth Halfpenny and Brendan White	11:57
Josh Bodom and Sha Samuels	Pin
Dan Magee and Kurtis Chapman	9:53

Semifinals; Live in Southampton 9 (11 August)
Aussie Open (Kyle Fletcher and Mark Davis)	Pin
Dan Moloney and MK McKinnan	16:59
Gabriel Kidd and Shaun Jackson	7:21
Josh Bodom and Sha Samuels	Pin

Final; Summer Sizzler (30 August)
Aussie Open (Kyle Fletcher and Mark Davis)	Pin
Josh Bodom and Sha Samuels	10:28

== See also ==
- 2019 in professional wrestling
- List of NJPW pay-per-view events
