= NJPW Royal Quest =

Royal Quest
- Promotions: New Japan Pro-Wrestling
- First event: Royal Quest (2019)

Royal Quest is an annual professional wrestling event promoted by New Japan Pro-Wrestling (NJPW). Since its inception in 2019, it has been held annually in London, England.

== History ==
The inaugural Royal Quest was the first-ever professional wrestling event independently promoted by NJPW in the United Kingdom. It was the first UK event produced by NJPW after Strong Style Evolved UK on June 30 and July 1, 2018 (in partnership with Revolution Pro Wrestling). Royal Quest II, the second Royal Quest, took place on October 1 & 2, 2022, establishing Royal Quest as an annual event. NJPW returned to the Copper Box for Royal Quest III on October 14, 2023. Royal Quest IV, the fourth event in the Royal Quest chronology, took place on October 20, 2024.

== Events ==
#	Event	Date	City	Venue	Attendance	Main event	Ref(s)
1	Royal Quest (2019)	August 31, 2019	London, England	Copper Box Arena	6,119	Kazuchika Okada (c) vs. Minoru Suzuki for the IWGP Heavyweight Championship	
2	Royal Quest II	October 1, 2022	London, England	Copper Box Arena		FTR (Cash Wheeler and Dax Harwood) (c) vs. Aussie Open (Mark Davis & Kyle Fletcher) for the IWGP Tag Team Championship	
2	Royal Quest II	October 2, 2022	London, England	Copper Box Arena		Tetsuya Naito vs. Zack Sabre Jr. to determine the #1 contender for the IWGP United States Heavyweight Championship	
3	Royal Quest III	October 14, 2023	London, England	Copper Box Arena	3,191	Will Ospreay (c) vs. Zack Sabre Jr. for the IWGP United Kingdom Heavyweight Championship (Note: Despite Ospreay renaming the title to IWGP United Kingdom Heavyweight Championship, the match was listed as a IWGP United States Heavyweight Championship title match by NJPW)	
4	Royal Quest IV	October 20, 2024	London, England	Crystal Palace National Sports Centre	1,544	Zack Sabre Jr. (c) vs. Sanada for the IWGP World Heavyweight Championship	
(c) – refers to the champion(s) heading into the match

== See also ==
- List of NJPW major events
