= Royal Quest II =

2022 New Japan Pro-Wrestling event

- Official poster of the event
- Promotion: New Japan Pro-Wrestling
- Date: October 1–2, 2022
- City: London, England
- Venue: Crystal Palace Indoor Arena

Event chronology
← Previous; Burning Spirit	Next → Declaration of Power

Royal Quest chronology
← Previous; I	Next → III

Royal Quest II was a professional wrestling event promoted by New Japan Pro-Wrestling (NJPW). It was the second Royal Quest event and took place on October 1 & 2, 2022 at the Crystal Palace Indoor Arena in London, England. Sound, Lighting and Video was provided and operated by Pixel 8 Productions.

== Production ==
=== Background ===
Royal Quest II was the second event in the Royal Quest chronology, following the first event in 2019.

On July 29, NJPW and Stardom announced the creation of the IWGP Women's Championship, which would be defend at NJPW events in Japan and United States. The inaugural champion will be crowned at Historic X-Over. During a press conference held on August 23, it was announced that one of the first-round matches of a tournament to determine the inaugural champion will be held at Royal Quest and would feature international female wrestlers. On August 27, during Stardom's 5 Star Grand Prix, it was announced that Alpha Female and Ava White would be participants in the international side of the tournament and will face off in the first round match at Royal Quest II.

=== Storylines ===
Royal Quest II featured professional wrestling matches that involved different wrestlers from pre-existing scripted feuds and storylines. Wrestlers portrayed villains, heroes or less distinguishable characters in the scripted events that built tension and culminate in a wrestling match or series of matches.

On June 26 at AEW x NJPW: Forbidden Door, ROH Tag Team Champions FTR (Cash Wheeler and Dax Harwood) defeated IWGP Tag Team Champions United Empire (Great-O-Khan and Jeff Cobb) in a winner Takes All three-way tag team match with also involved Roppongi Vice (Rocky Romero and Trent Beretta). On July 30, Aussie Open (Mark Davis and Kyle Fletcher) along with their United Empire stalemate TJP defeated FTR and Alex Zayne in a six-man tag team match at Music City Mayhem, after the match Aussie Open challenged FTR for the IWGP Tag Team titles which the title match was later made official for Royal Quest II on October 1.

== Results ==
Night 1
No.	Results	Stipulations	Times
1	Gabriel Kidd defeated Dan Moloney	Singles match	9:19
2	Michael Oku and Ricky Knight Jr. defeated United Empire (Great-O-Khan and Gideon Grey)	Tag team match	12:17
3	Ava White and Alex Windsor defeated Jazzy Gabert and Kanji	Tag team match	6:18
4	Los Ingobernables de Japon (Tetsuya Naito, Sanada and Hiromu Takahashi) defeated Suzuki-gun (Zack Sabre Jr., El Desperado and Douki)	Six-man tag team match	14:29
5	Chaos (Kazuchika Okada and Tomohiro Ishii) defeated Bad Dude Tito and Zak Knight	Tag team match	12:47
6	Hiroshi Tanahashi and Guerrillas of Destiny (Tama Tonga, Hikuleo and Jado) defeated Bullet Club (Jay White, The Good Brothers (Karl Anderson and Doc Gallows) and Gedo)	Eight-man tag team match	12:15
7	Will Ospreay defeated Shota Umino	Singles match	15:30
8	FTR (Cash Wheeler and Dax Harwood) (c) defeated Aussie Open (Mark Davis and Kyle Fletcher)	Tag team match for the IWGP Tag Team Championship	31:59
(c) / – the champion(s) heading into the match

Night 2
No.	Results	Stipulations	Times
1	Suzuki-gun (El Desperado and Douki) defeated Michael Oku and Robbie X	Tag team match	9:33
2	Los Ingobernables de Japon (Sanada and Hiromu Takahashi) defeated North West Strong (Ethan Allen and Luke Jacobs)	Tag team match	14:04
3	Jazzy Gabert defeated Ava White	IWGP Women's Championship tournament first round match	10:34
4	United Empire (Will Ospreay, Great-O-Khan, Aussie Open (Mark Davis and Kyle Fletcher) and Gideon Grey) defeated FTR (Cash Wheeler and Dax Harwood), Shota Umino, Gabriel Kidd and Ricky Knight Jr.	Ten-man tag team match	16:57
5	Hiroshi Tanahashi and Guerrillas of Destiny (Tama Tonga and Hikuleo) defeated Bullet Club (Jay White and The Good Brothers (Doc Gallows and Karl Anderson))	Six-man tag team match	10:54
6	Kazuchika Okada defeated Bad Dude Tito	Singles match	8:13
7	Tomohiro Ishii defeated Yota Tsuji	Singles match	17:36
8	Tetsuya Naito defeated Zack Sabre Jr.	Singles match to determine the #1 contender for the IWGP United States Heavyweight Championship	21:05

== See also ==
- 2022 in professional wrestling
- List of NJPW major events
