= Kyle Fletcher =

Australian professional wrestler (born 1998)

- Fletcher in 2026

Personal information
- Born: Kyle Fletcher; 24 December 1998 (age 27) Sydney, New South Wales, Australia

Professional wrestling career
- Ring name(s): InstaGraham; Kyle Fletcher
- Billed height: 1.91 m (6 ft 3 in)
- Billed weight: 109 kg (240 lb)
- Billed from: Sydney, Australia
- Trained by: PWA Academy; Madison Eagles; Ryan Eagles; Robbie Eagles; Travis Banks
- Debut: 20 April 2014

Kyle Fletcher (born 24 December 1998) is an Australian professional wrestler. He is signed to All Elite Wrestling (AEW), where he is a member of the Don Callis Family. He is a former one-time AEW International Champion, two-time AEW TNT Champion and a former one-time AEW World Trios Champion. He previously performed in its sister company Ring of Honor (ROH), where he is a former one-time ROH World Tag Team Champion and ROH World Television Champion.

Fletcher was previously signed to New Japan Pro-Wrestling (NJPW) where he was a former IWGP Tag Team Champion and inaugural and record-setting two-time Strong Openweight Tag Team Champion. He also made appearances for British promotion Revolution Pro Wrestling (RevPro) where he was a two-time Undisputed British Tag Team Champion.

Fletcher and fellow Australian wrestler Mark Davis teamed together as Aussie Open from 2017 to 2023, which in turn formed part of the United Empire stable. He has also made appearances for numerous promotions in England, Wales, Ireland, and Germany in addition to performing in the Australian independent circuit for companies such as Melbourne City Wrestling.

== Early life ==
Fletcher was born and raised on the Northern Beaches region in Sydney, Australia. He grew up playing an array of sports throughout his childhood including Australian rules football, cricket, rugby league, soccer and surfing. A fan of professional wrestling from an early age, he was trained by Madison Eagles, Ryan Eagles, and Robbie Eagles in the Australia-based PWA Academy from the age of 14.

== Professional wrestling career ==
=== Early career (2014–2019) ===
Fletcher debuted in July 2014, wrestling around the New South Wales state where he worked for companies such as Melbourne City Wrestling, wrestling under the ring name InstaGraham. In 2017, he changed his ring name to Kyle Fletcher.

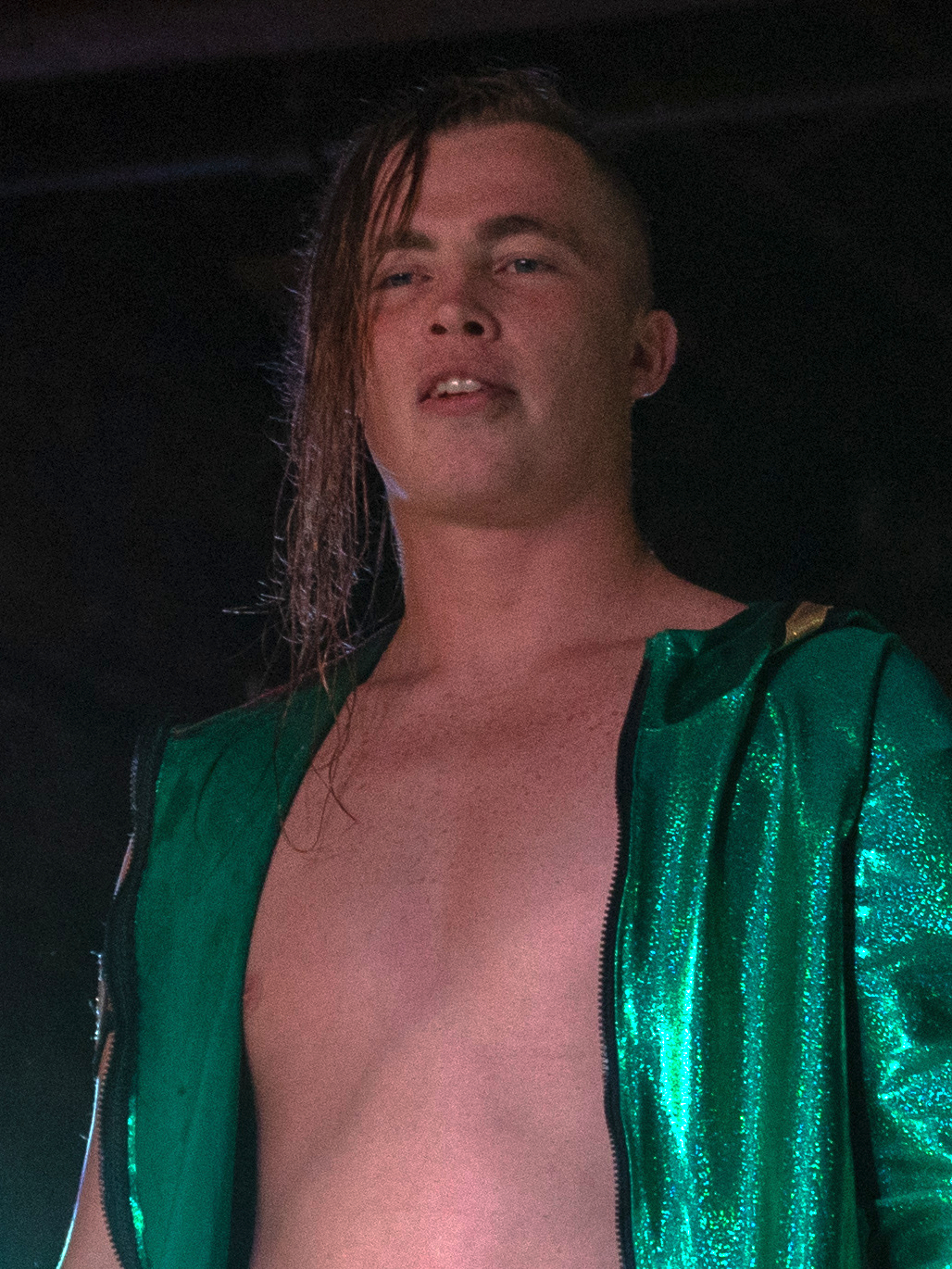
Kyle Fletcher at an indie event in April 2019.

In May 2017, Fletcher traveled to the United Kingdom to work on their independent scene, commonly working for WhatCulture Pro-Wrestling (WCPW) and Attack! Pro Wrestling. During July of the same year, Fletcher teamed up with fellow Australian wrestler Mark Davis as The Aussie Assault. The two commonly teamed from there on and changed their team name to Aussie Open, competing together across the UK. Fletcher made an appearance for the Chikara promotion. Aussie Open also competed in Europe for promotions such as Westside Xtreme Wrestling. In August, Aussie Open made their debuts for Revolution Pro Wrestling and continued to work there long term. This meant that they would work with New Japan Pro-Wrestling talent due to their working agreement with RevPro. Aussie Open commonly faced talent such as Roppongi 3K, who were on a learning excursion from New Japan. During their tour of the UK in May 2018, Aussie Open made their Ring of Honor debut, losing to Dalton Castle's "boys". In March 2019, Aussie Open won the wXw World Tag Team Championship before losing them to Ilja Dragunov and WALTER, ending their reign at 147 days. They regained the championships 41 days later, yet they had to vacate them after 14 days due to Davis suffering a leg injury. In May 2019, Aussie Open achieved a massive victory by defeating NJPW's Suzuki-gun (Minoru Suzuki and Zack Sabre Jr.) to win the British Tag Team Championships for the first time. They lost the titles to Sha Samuels and Josh Bodom, ending their reign at 50 days.

=== New Japan Pro-Wrestling (2019–2023) ===
Aussie Open made their NJPW debut at NJPW Royal Quest on 31 August, losing in an IWGP Tag Team Championship match to Guerrillas of Destiny (Tama Tonga and Tanga Loa). Aussie Open wrestled infrequently in 2020, due to the COVID-19 pandemic. In February 2021, Aussie Open returned to Australia, for the first time as a team, wrestling on several independent shows. Aussie Open returned to RevPro on 21 August 2021, and regained the British Tag Team Championships the following month. On 19 September, at RevPro's High Stakes Event, Aussie Open joined Undisputed British Heavyweight Championship Will Ospreay in attacking The Young Guns and Shota Umino, joining the United Empire stable and turning heel. The three consistently began teaming as a trio across the UK. They lost the championships to Roy Knight and Ricky Knight Jr, ending their reign at 63 days. On 10 April 2022, Aussie Open, made their NJPW Strong debuts, teaming with fellow United Empire stablemate, Jeff Cobb to defeat TMDK. On 16 April at Windy City Riot, Aussie Open and Cobb, teamed with fellow stablemates, Great-O-Khan, T. J. Perkins and Aaron Henare to defeat Bullet Club representatives, The Good Brothers (Doc Gallows and Karl Anderson), Chris Bey, El Phantasmo, Hikuleo and guest member Scott Norton in a 12-man tag-team match. At Capital Collision, Cobb, Henare and Aussie Open lost to TMDK in an 8-man tag-team match.

On the 19 June edition of NJPW Strong Ignition, Aussie Open competed in a tournament to crown the inaugural Strong Openweight Tag Team Championship. In the first round, they defeated The Dark Order's Evil Uno and Alan Angels and they defeated the Stray Dog Army in the semi-finals. In the finals at Strong: High Alert, Fletcher and Davis defeated Christopher Daniels and Yuya Uemura to become the inaugural champions.

At Music City Mayhem, Aussie Open teamed with T. J. Perkins to defeat the team of Alex Zayne and the IWGP Tag Team Champions, FTR. After the match, Aussie Open challenged FTR to a match for the IWGP Tag Team Championships. They received their match at Royal Quest II, where they lost to FTR. At Rumble on 44th Street, Aussie Open lost the Strong Openweight Tag Team Championships to The Motor City Machine Guns in a three-way tag-team match also involving The DKC and Kevin Knight, ending their inaugural reign at 76 days.

Davis and Fletcher would compete individually in the 2023 New Japan Cup in March. Fletcher defeated IWGP Tag Team Champion, Yoshi-Hashi, but was defeated by the other half of the tag-team champions Hirooki Goto. Davis defeated Toru Yano in the first round before losing to United Empire stablemate Will Ospreay in the next round. However, Ospreay would be injured in their match, resulting in Davis advancing to the third round where he would defeat Evil. In the semi-final round, Davis lost to Sanada, thus being eliminated from the tournament. Due to Davis' success in the tournament and Fletcher's victory over Tag Team Champion Yoshi-Hashi, Aussie Open earnt a shot at the IWGP Tag Team Championships, against Bishamon at Sakura Genesis. On 8 April at the event, Aussie Open defeated Bishamon to win their first IWGP Tag Team Championship. On 15 April at Capital Collision, Fletcher and Davis defeated The Motor City Machine Guns and the team of Kazuchika Okada and Hiroshi Tanahashi, in a three-way tag-team match, to regain the Strong Openweight Tag Team Championships for a second time, making them double champions in NJPW. They defended the Strong titles the next night against Lio Rush and Tomohiro Ishii. On 29 April at NJPW Wrestling Satsuma no Kuni, Aussie Open retained the IWGP Tag Team Championships, defeating TMDK (Mikey Nicholls and Shane Haste) On 21 May at Resurgence, Fletcher announced that the team would vacate both titles, due to Mark Davis's injury.

=== All Elite Wrestling / Ring of Honor (2022–present) ===
==== Aussie Open (2022–2023) ====
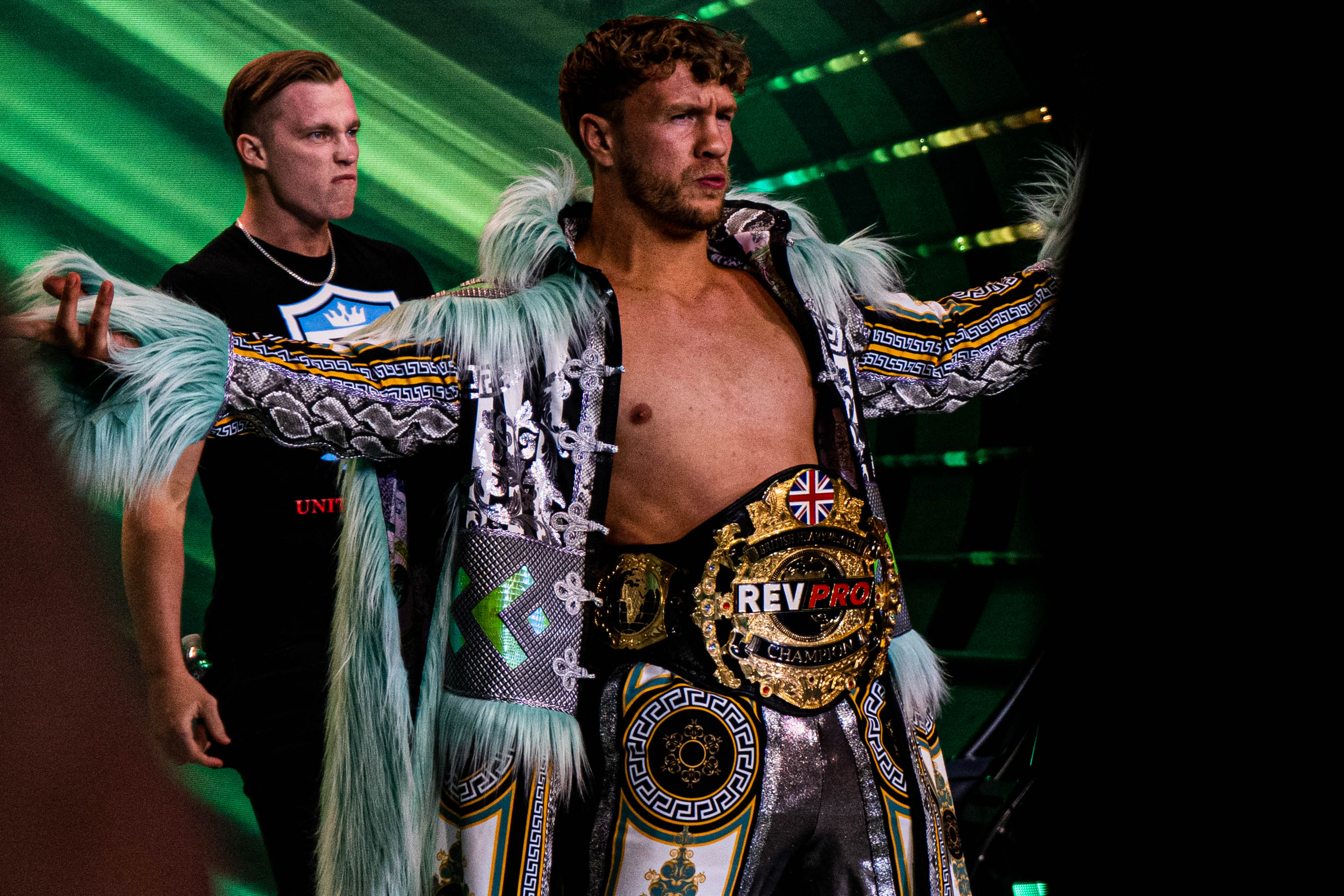
Fletcher (left) who accompanied Will Ospreay at AEW x NJPW: Forbidden Door on June 26, 2022.

On the 8 June episode of Dynamite, Aussie Open and Aaron Henare made their All Elite Wrestling (AEW) debuts, aiding Will Ospreay in attacking FTR and Trent Beretta. They made their in-ring debuts on the 10 June edition of Rampage, where they made their in-ring debuts with Ospreay, where they lost to FTR and Beretta in a 6-man tag-team match.On 27 July, the AEW World Trios Championship was revealed, with Aussie Open and Ospreay being named as participants in the inaugural tournament. On 24 August, Aussie Open and Ospreay defeated Death Triangle (Pac, Rey Fenix and Penta Oscuro) to progress to the semi-finals, where they were defeated by The Elite (The Young Bucks and Kenny Omega) on 31 August.

On 9 March, Fletcher and Davis made their return to Ring of Honor (ROH), which was now AEW's sister promotion, following Tony Khan's purchase of the company, defeating Rhett Titus and Tracy Williams. At Supercard of Honor, The duo competed in the "Reach for the Sky" ladder match for the vacant ROH World Tag Team Championship, but failed to win the match. A week after winning the IWGP Tag Team Championships, Fletcher and Davis made their first title defense against Best Friends, defeating them and retaining the titles on the 14 April edition of Rampage. On the 10 May edition of Dynamite, Fletcher appeared in a backstage segment, attacking AEW International Champion Orange Cassidy and a championship match between the two took place two weeks later on Dynamite, where Cassidy defeated Fletcher. Shortly after, it was announced that both Fletcher and Davis had signed with AEW.

On 21 July 2023, the duo won the ROH World Tag Team Championships at Death Before Dishonor in a Four-way tag team match. The following week on Ring of Honor, Aussie Open made their first title defence, defeating the Iron Savages. At Dynamite: 200, Aussie Open retained their titles against El Hijo del Vikingo and Komander. On the following week's episode of Rampage, the duo accepted a challenge by Better Than You Bay Bay (Adam Cole and MJF) for the titles on the Zero-Hour of All In. In the lead up to the match, Aussie Open made further title defences against Ethan Page and Isiah Kassidy on the following week on Rampage and The Hardys (Matt and Jeff Hardy) on 23 August on an episode of Dynamite. On the Zero-Hour of All In, Aussie Open lost the ROH World Tag Team Titles to Cole and MJF, ending their reign at 37 days.

Following the loss, the duo shifted their focus towards the AEW World Tag Team Championships, calling out champions FTR on the 16 September edition of Collision, demanding a championship match at WrestleDream. Soon after, the match was made official for the event on 1 October, which was notably the one-year anniversary of the two team's last match, for the IWGP World Tag Team Championships at Royal Quest II. At WrestleDream, FTR defeated Aussie Open, retaining their Championships. After the event, it was revealed that Davis had suffered a wrist injury and would be out of action, leaving Fletcher as a singles wrestler.

==== Don Callis Family (2023–present) ====
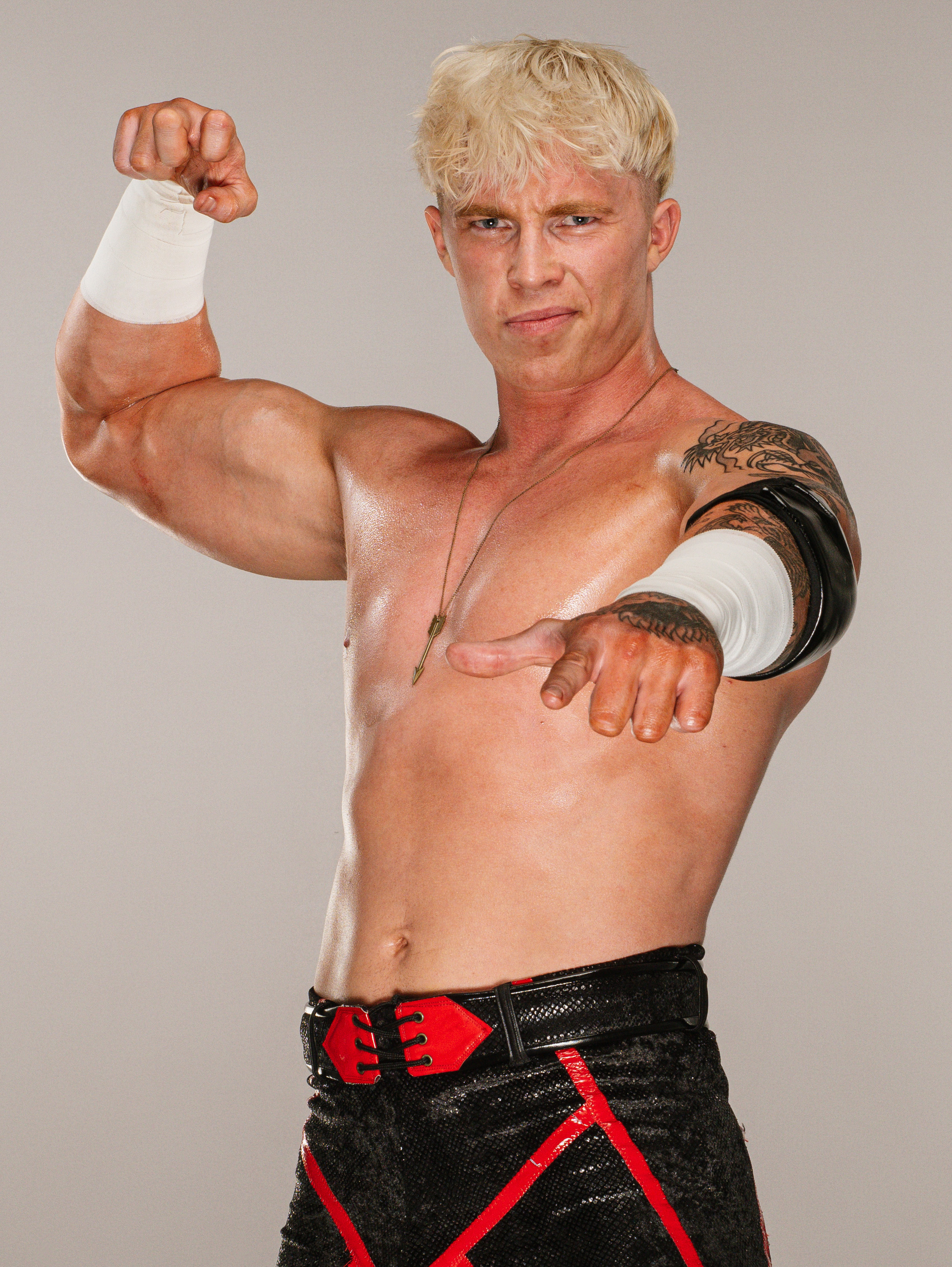
Fletcher in July 2024

On 27 October, Fletcher joined the Don Callis Family after losing to Konosuke Takeshita on Rampage. On 15 December at Final Battle, Fletcher defeated Komander, Lee Moriarty, Dalton Castle, Lee Johnson, and Bryan Keith in a Survival of the Fittest match to win the vacant ROH World Television Championship, his first singles championship. He also debuted his "Protostar" persona, which included new entrance music and ring gear.

On 5 April 2024 at Supercard of Honor, Fletcher successfully defended the World Television Championship against Lee Johnson. He later lost the title to Atlantis Jr. at Consejo Mundial de Lucha Libre (CMLL)'s Viernes Espectacular, ending his reign at 196 days. On the 11 September episode of Dynamite, Fletcher and Will Ospreay won a Casino Gauntlet match on Dynamite to earn a shot at The Young Bucks' AEW World Tag Team Championship at Grand Slam on 25 September, but failed to win the titles. On 12 October at WrestleDream, Fletcher turned on Ospreay and helped Takeshita win the AEW International Championship. On 30 October at Fright Night Dynamite, Fletcher was confronted by his returning tag team partner Mark Davis. On 6 November, Ospreay chased Fletcher away after he attempted to attack Davis, effectively ending Aussie Open. On 23 November at Full Gear, Fletcher defeated Ospreay. He subsequently entered the 2024 Continental Classic, winning the Blue League with 12 points before losing to Ospreay in the semifinals at Worlds End on 28 December.

On 9 March 2025 at Revolution, Fletcher lost to Ospreay in a steel cage match, concluding their trilogy of matches. In April, Fletcher reached the semifinals of the 2025 Owen Hart Cup, defeating Mark Briscoe in the quarterfinals at Dynasty on 6 April before losing to "Hangman" Adam Page on the 30 April episode of Dynamite. On 25 May at Double or Nothing, Fletcher teamed with Josh Alexander and Takeshita to defeat Paragon.

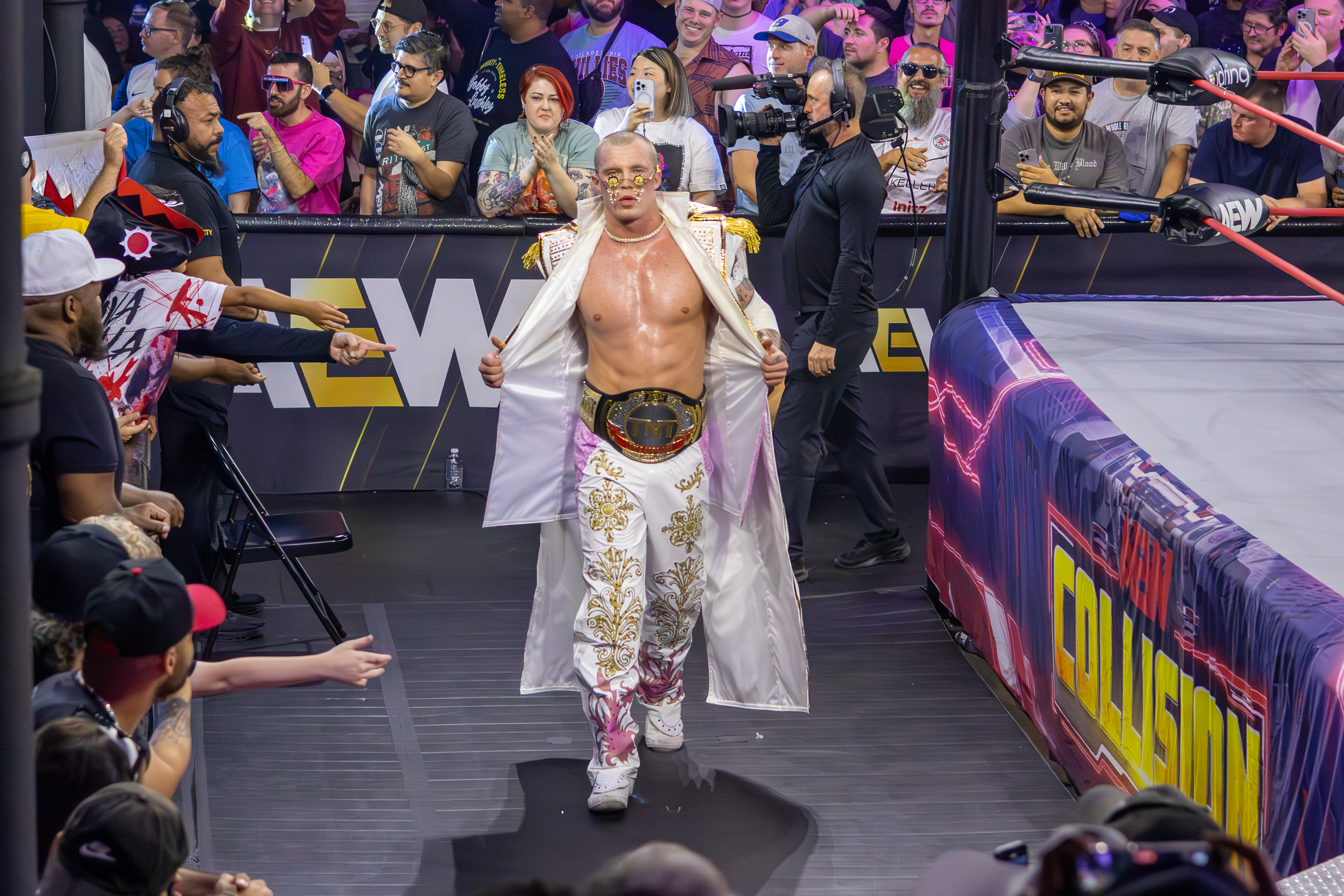
Fletcher as the AEW TNT Champion In August 2025

On 5 July at Collision 100, Fletcher defeated Daniel Garcia to earn a title match against Adam Cole at All In. On 12 July, Cole vacated the AEW TNT Championship due to injury, and Fletcher competed in a four-way match for the vacant title, which was won by Dustin Rhodes. On 31 July, Fletcher defeated Rhodes in a Chicago Street Fight on Collision to win the TNT Championship for the first time. At All Out on 20 September, Fletcher unsuccessfully challenged Adam Page for the AEW World Championship. On 22 November at Full Gear, Fletcher lost the TNT Championship to Briscoe in a No Disqualification match, ending his reign at 114 days. He subsequently entered the 2025 Continental Classic, winning the Gold League with nine points before losing to Jon Moxley in the semifinals at Worlds End on 27 December.

On the 11 February 2026 episode of Dynamite, Fletcher defeated Tommaso Ciampa to win the TNT Championship for the second time. On 14 February at Grand Slam Australia, he retained the title against Mark Briscoe in a ladder match. On the 4 March episode of Dynamite, Fletcher won the AEW World Trios Championship with Kazuchika Okada and Mark Davis, defeating Jet Set Rodeo. They lost the titles to Místico and JetSpeed at Revolution on 15 March. On 28 March, Fletcher suffered a meniscus injury during a tag team match on Collision; he later revealed that he had also fractured his ankle and tibia. On 8 April, AEW president Tony Khan announced that Fletcher would relinquish the TNT Championship due to injury, ending his reign at 56 days.

On 24 May at Double or Nothing, Fletcher returned and attacked Takeshita, expelling him from the Don Callis Family. On 8 July at Beach Break, Fletcher defeated Takeshita to win the AEW International Championship. After a 53-day reign, Fletcher lost the title to Kazuchika Okada in a three-way match also involving Takeshita at All In on 30 August.

On 26 September at All Out, Fletcher and Kevin Knight defeated Darby Allin and Steven Borden to become the number one contenders for the AEW World Tag Team Championship. On 17 October at WrestleDream, Fletcher and Knight unsuccessfully challenged The Young Bucks for the titles. On 4 November, Fletcher and his Don Callis Family teammates won a Blood & Guts match, with Fletcher forcing Adam Copeland to surrender. On 14 November at Full Gear, Fletcher unsuccessfully challenged Will Ospreay for the AEW World Championship.

=== Consejo Mundial de Lucha Libre (2024–present) ===
Fletcher made his debut for Consejo Mundial de Lucha Libre (CMLL) on 28 June 2024, where he lost his ROH World Television Championship to Atlantis Jr.. On 17 July, he was announced as a participant in that year's International Grand Prix tournament. During the torneo cibernetico on 23 August, Fletcher eliminated Euforia and Místico, before being the third to last wrestler eliminated by Atlantis Jr.

== Personal life ==
Fletcher has cited Jeff Hardy as an early inspiration for wanting to become a professional wrestler. In June 2023, Fletcher confirmed his relationship with fellow wrestler Skye Blue on social media.

== Championships and accomplishments ==
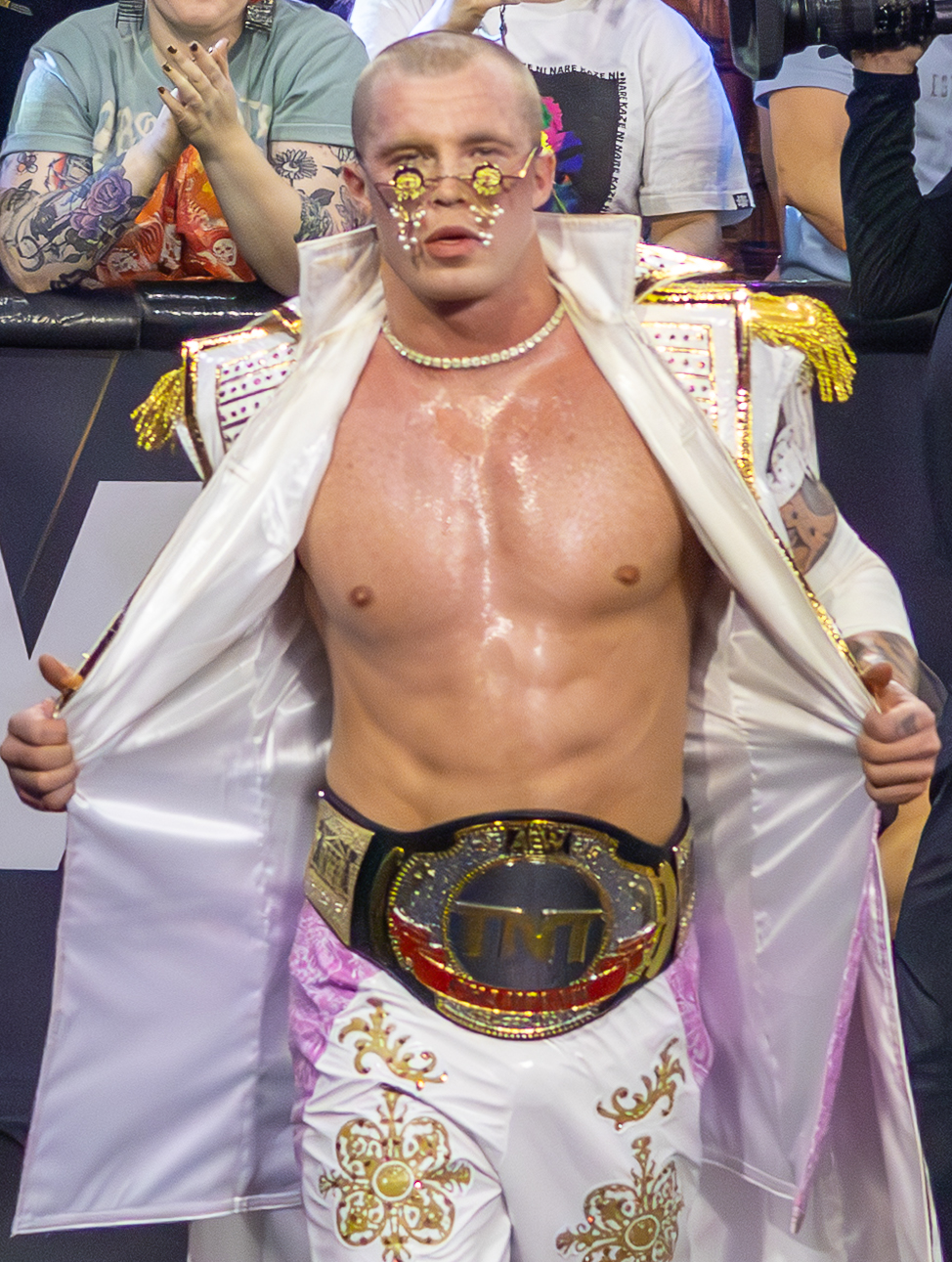
Fletcher is a two-time AEW TNT Champion

Fletcher is a one-time AEW International Champion

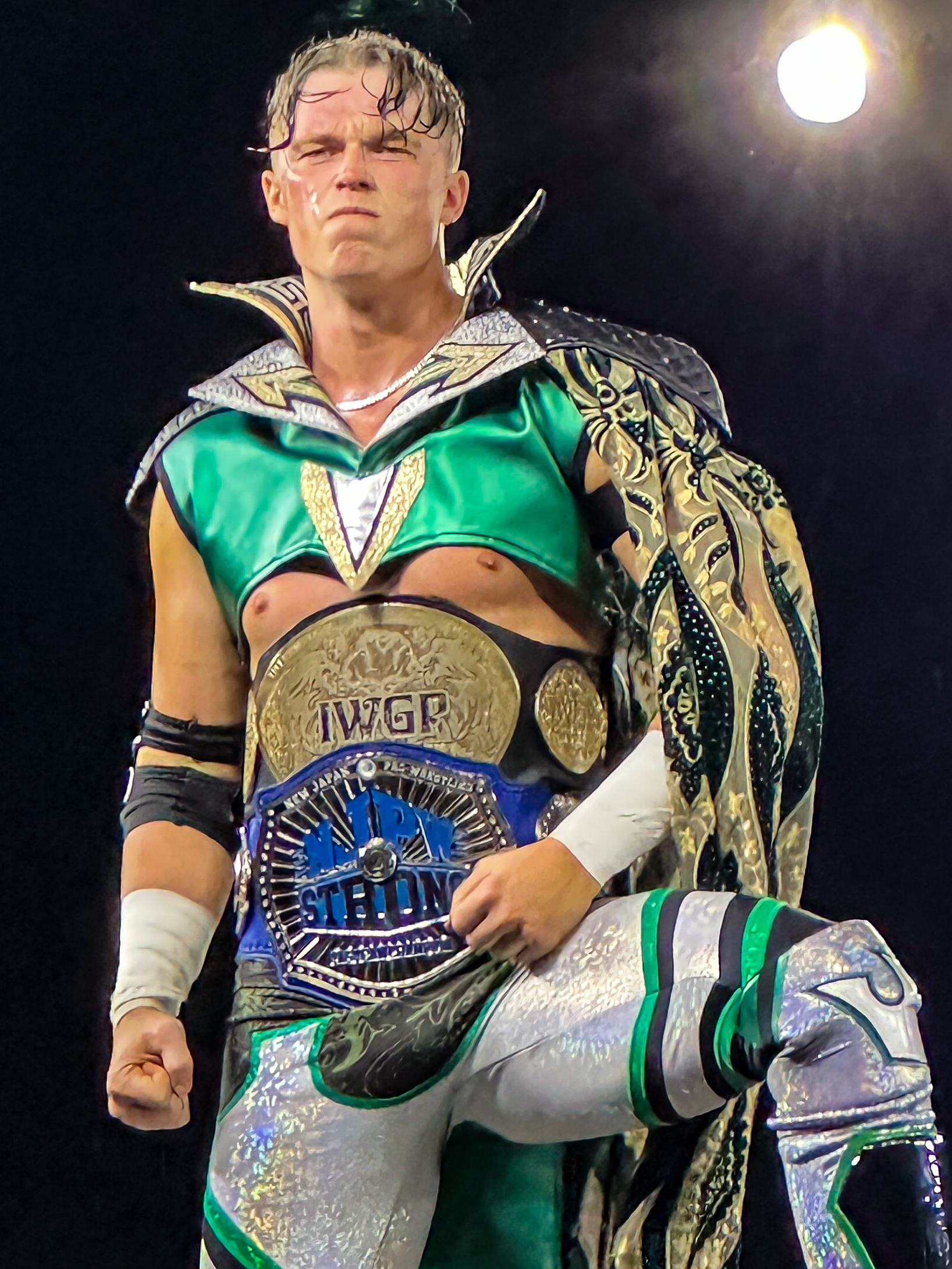
Fletcher is a one-time IWGP Tag Team Champion (top belt) and two-time Strong Openweight Tag Team Champion (bottom belt)

- All Elite Wrestling
  - AEW International Championship (1 time)
  - AEW TNT Championship (2 times)
  - AEW World Trios Championship (1 time) – with Kazuchika Okada and Mark Davis
- ATTACK! Pro Wrestling
  - ATTACK! 24:7 Championship (4 times)
  - ATTACK! Tag Team Championship (2 times) – with Mark Davis
- Defiant Wrestling
  - Defiant Tag Team Championship (2 times) – with Mark Davis
- ESPN
  - Named breakthrough wrestler for 2025
- Fight Club: PRO
  - FCP Tag Team Championship (1 time) – with Chris Brookes
- HOPE Wrestling
  - HOPE 24/7 Hardcore Championship (4 times)
  - HOPE Tag Team Championship (1 time) – with Mark Davis
- New Japan Pro Wrestling
  - IWGP Tag Team Championship (1 time) – with Mark Davis
  - Strong Openweight Tag Team Championship (2 times, inaugural) – with Mark Davis
  - Strong Openweight Tag Team Championship Tournament – with Mark Davis
- Over the Top Wrestling
  - OTT Tag Team Championship (1 time) – with Mark Davis
- Progress Wrestling
  - Progress Tag Team Championship (2 times) – with Mark Davis
- Pro Wrestling Illustrated
  - Faction of the Year (2025) as part of the Don Callis Family
  - Ranked No. 21 of the top 500 singles wrestlers in the PWI 500 in 2026
- PWA Black Label
  - PWA Tag Team Championship (2 times) – with Blue Oni (1) and Mark Davis (1)
- Revolution Pro Wrestling
  - Undisputed British Tag Team Championship (2 times) – with Mark Davis
  - Road to Royal Quest Tag Team Tournament (2019)
  - RevPro Undisputed British Tag Team Title No. 1 Contendership Tournament (2018–19)
- Ring of Honor
  - ROH World Tag Team Championship (1 time) – with Mark Davis
  - ROH World Television Championship (1 time)
  - Survival of the Fittest (2023)
- Sports Illustrated
  - Breakout Wrestler of the Year (2025)
- Westside Xtreme Wrestling
  - wXw World Tag Team Championship (2 times) – with Mark Davis
- Wrestling Observer Newsletter
  - Most Improved (2024)
