= Aussie Open (professional wrestling) =

Professional wrestling tag team

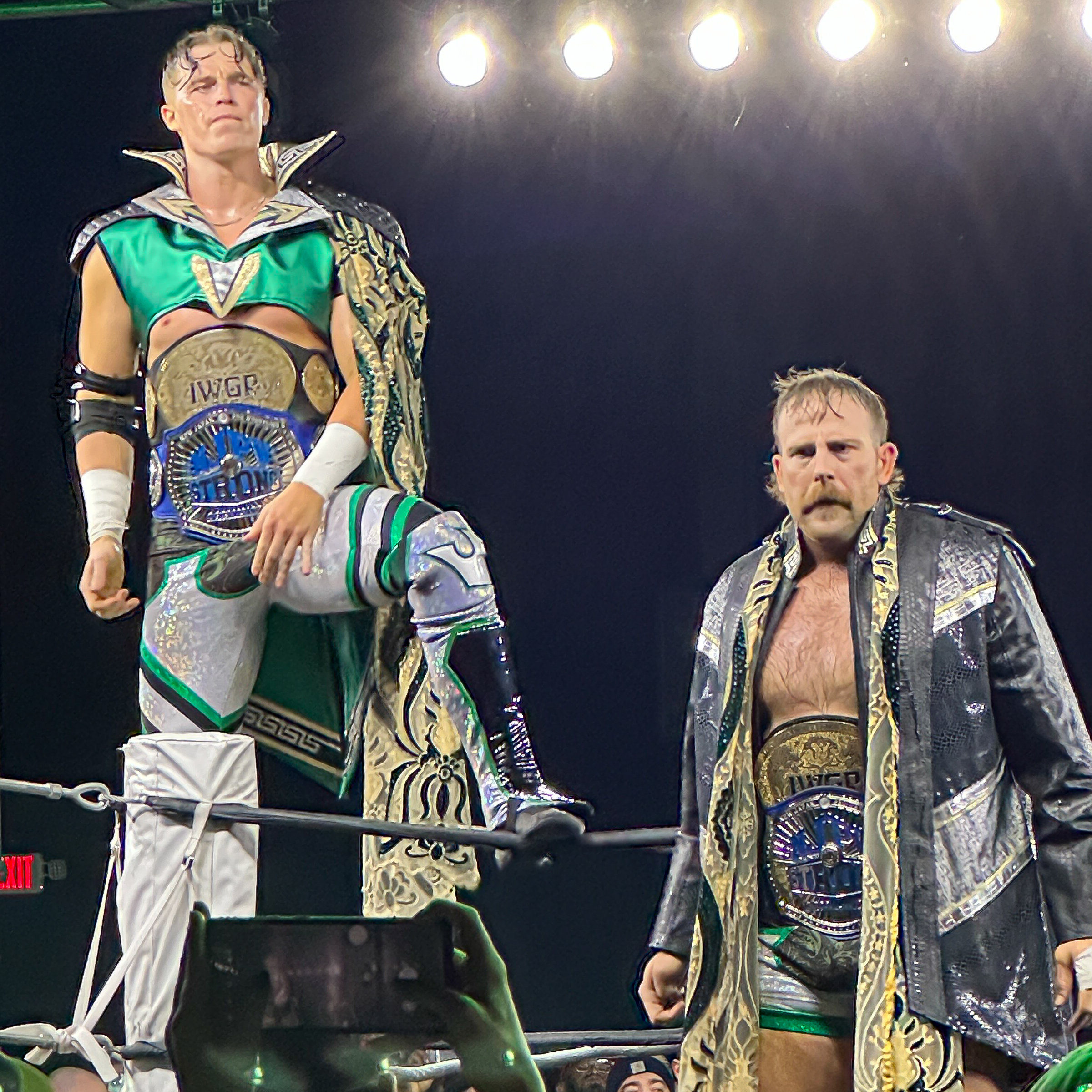
- Aussie Open as IWGP Heavyweight and Strong Openweight Tag Team Champions in 2023

Tag team
- Members: Mark Davis; Kyle Fletcher
- Name(s): Aussie Open; The Aussie Assault; Don Callis Family; Kyle Fletcher and Mark Davis
- Billed heights: Davis: 1.92 m (6 ft 3 1/2 in); Fletcher: 1.93 m (6 ft 4 in)
- Combined billed weight: 205 kg (452 lb)
- Debut: 7 July 2017
- Years active: 2017–2024; 2026–present

Kyle Fletcher and Mark Davis, formerly known as Aussie Open, are an Australian professional wrestling tag team. They are signed to All Elite Wrestling (AEW), where they are members of the Don Callis Family. Fletcher and Davis are former AEW World Trios Champions with stablemate Kazuchika Okada. They also wrestle for AEW’s sister company Ring of Honor (ROH), where they are former ROH World Tag Team Champions.

The duo were previously signed to New Japan Pro-Wrestling (NJPW), where they were members of the United Empire, former IWGP Tag Team Champions, and inaugural and record-setting two-time Strong Openweight Tag Team Champions.

They also have wrestled regularly for European promotions, including the England based Revolution Pro Wrestling (RevPro), where they are two-time Undisputed British Tag Team Champions, and the Germany based Westside Xtreme Wrestling (wXw), where they are two-time wXw World Tag Team Champions.

The two began teaming in 2017 whilst working on the United Kingdom independent scene and briefly wrestled under the name The Aussie Assault.

== History ==
=== Early career (2007–2016) ===
Both men worked around the Australian independent scene, Davis debuted in 2007 and Fletcher in 2014. Both men worked for independent promotions, such as Melbourne City Wrestling.

=== Formation in United Kingdom (2017–2022) ===
Both men separately traveled to the United Kingdom in 2017, and worked for independent promotions such as WhatCulture Pro-Wrestling (WCPW) and Attack! Pro Wrestling. In July, the two men teamed together for the first time at a WCPW event, as The Aussie Assault. After this, the two began teaming more frequently, eventually changing their name to Aussie Open and working on the independent scene as a tag team. Aussie Open also competed in Europe, for promotions such as Westside Xtreme Wrestling. In August, Aussie Open made their debuts for Revolution Pro Wrestling and continued to work with them in the long term. This meant that they would work with New Japan Pro-Wrestling (NJPW) talent due to their working agreement with RevPro. Aussie Open commonly faced talent such as Roppongi 3K, who were on a learning excursion from New Japan. During their tour of the UK in May 2018, Aussie Open made their Ring of Honor debut, losing to Dalton Castle's "boys". On 14 October at Global Wars UK, an inter-promotional event held by RevPro and NJPW, Davis lost to Satoshi Kojima. In March 2019, Aussie Open won the wXw World Tag Team Championship, before losing them to Ilja Dragunov and WALTER, ending their reign at 147 days. They regained the championships 41 days later but had to vacate them after 14 days, due to Davis suffering a leg injury. In May 2019, Aussie Open achieved a massive victory, by defeating NJPW's Suzuki-gun (Minoru Suzuki and Zack Sabre Jr), to win the British Tag Team Championships for the first time. They lost the titles to Sha Samuels and Josh Bodom, ending their reign at 50 days.

=== New Japan Pro-Wrestling (2019–2023) ===
Aussie Open made their NJPW debut at NJPW Royal Quest on 31 August, losing in an IWGP Tag Team Championship match to Guerrillas of Destiny (Tama Tonga and Tanga Loa). Aussie Open wrestled infrequently in 2020, due to the COVID-19 pandemic. In February 2021, Aussie Open returned to Australia, for the first time as a team, wrestling on several independent shows. Aussie Open returned to RevPro on 21 August 2021, and regained the British Tag Team Championships the following month. On 19 September, at RevPro's High Stakes Event, Aussie Open joined Undisputed British Heavyweight Champion Will Ospreay in attacking The Young Guns and Shota Umino, joining the United Empire stable and turning heel. The three consistently began teaming as a trio across the UK. They lost the championships to Roy Knight and Ricky Knight Jr, ending their reign at 63 days. On 10 April 2022, Aussie Open, made their NJPW Strong debuts, teaming with fellow United Empire stablemate, Jeff Cobb to defeat TMDK. On 16 April at Windy City Riot, Aussie Open and Cobb, teamed with fellow stablemates, Great-O-Khan, T. J. Perkins and Aaron Henare to defeat Bullet Club representatives, The Good Brothers (Doc Gallows and Karl Anderson), Chris Bey, El Phantasmo and guest member Scott Norton in a 12-man tag-team match. At Capital Collision, Cobb, Henare and Aussie Open lost to TMDK in an 8-man tag-team match. On the 19 June edition of NJPW Strong Ignition, Aussie Open competed in a tournament to crown the inaugural Strong Openweight Tag Team Championship. In the first round, they defeated The Dark Order's Evil Uno and Alan Angels and they defeated the Stray Dog Army in the semi-finals. In the finals at Strong: High Alert, Davis and Fletcher defeated Christopher Daniels and Yuya Uemura to become the inaugural champions.

At Music City Mayhem, Aussie Open teamed with T. J. Perkins to defeat the team of Alex Zayne and the IWGP Tag Team Champions, FTR. After the match, Aussie Open challenged FTR to a match for the IWGP Tag Team Championships. They received their match at Royal Quest II, where they lost to FTR. At Rumble on 44th Street, Aussie Open lost the Strong Openweight Tag Team Championships to The Motor City Machine Guns in a three-way tag-team match also involving The DKC and Kevin Knight, ending their inaugural reign at 76 days.

In November, Aussie Open traveled to Japan for the first time, competing in their first World Tag League tournament. The duo finished the tournament with 14 points, tieing for first with Bishamon (Hirooki Goto and Yoshi-Hashi), meaning both teams advanced to the finals. In the tournament finals, Bishamon defeated Aussie Open to win the tournament.

Davis and Fletcher would compete individually in the 2023 New Japan Cup in March. Fletcher defeated IWGP Tag Team Champion, Yoshi-Hashi, but was defeated by the other half of the tag-team champions Hirooki Goto. Davis defeated Toru Yano in the first round before losing to United Empire stablemate Will Ospreay in the next round. However, Ospreay would be injured in their match, resulting in Davis advancing to the third round where he would defeat Evil. In the semi-final round, Davis lost to Sanada, thus being eliminated from the tournament. Due to Davis' success in the tournament and Fletcher's victory over Tag Team Champion Yoshi-Hashi, Aussie Open earnt a shot at the IWGP Tag Team Championships, against Bishamon at Sakura Genesis. On 8 April at the event, Aussie Open defeated Bishamon to win their first IWGP Tag Team Championship. On 15 April at Capital Collision, Fletcher and Davis defeated The Motor City Machine Guns and the team of Kazuchika Okada and Hiroshi Tanahashi, in a three-way tag-team match, to regain the Strong Openweight Tag Team Championships for a second time, making them double champions in NJPW. They defended the Strong titles the next night against Lio Rush and Tomohiro Ishii. On 29 April at NJPW Wrestling Satsuma no Kuni, Aussie Open retained the IWGP Tag Team Championships, defeating TMDK (Mikey Nicholls and Shane Haste) On 21 May at Resurgence, Fletcher announced that the team would vacate both titles, due to Mark Davis's injury.

=== All Elite Wrestling / Ring of Honor ===
==== Sporadic appearances (2022–2023) ====
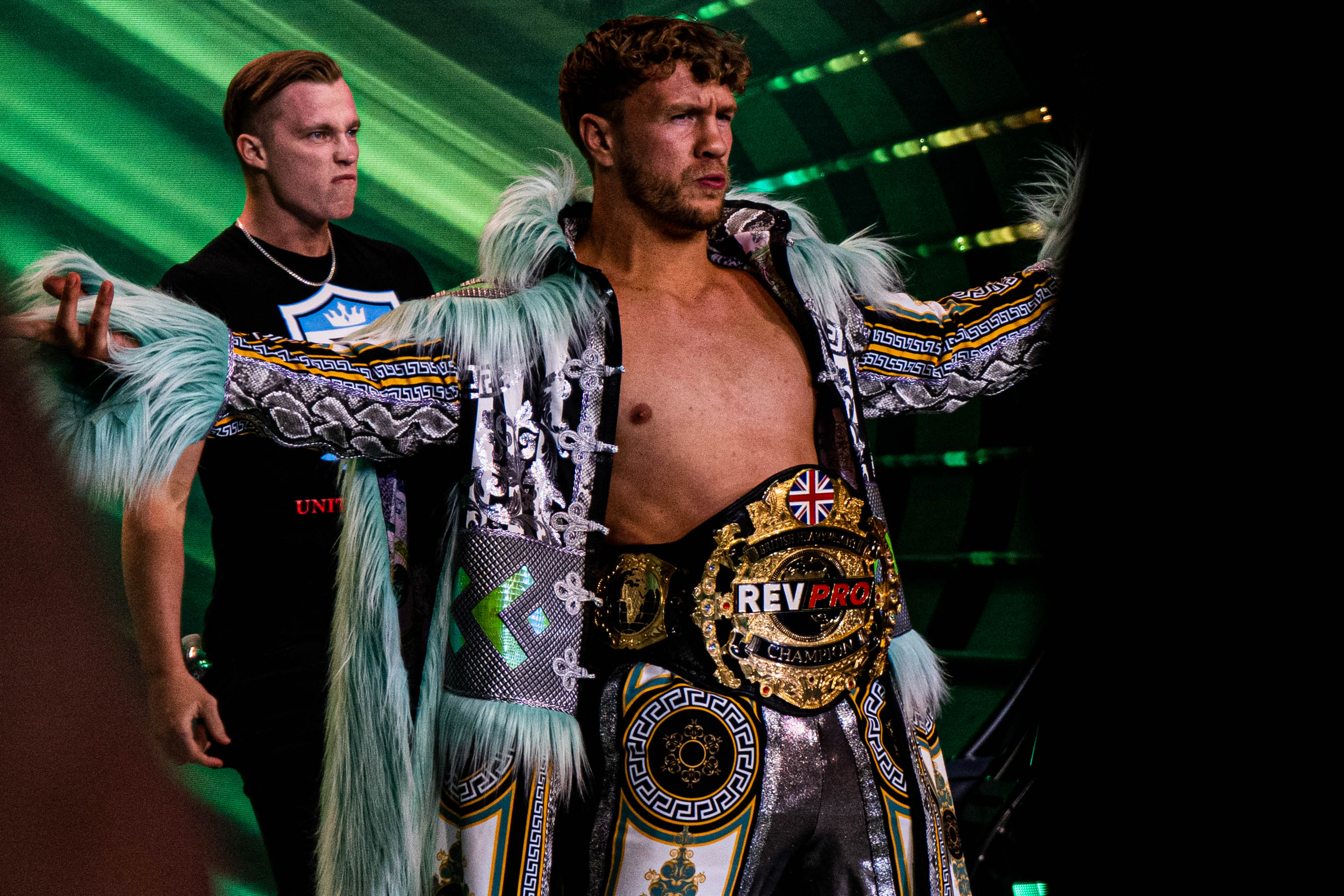
Fletcher (left) who accompanied Will Ospreay at AEWxNJPW: Forbidden Door on June 26, 2022.

On the 8 June episode of Dynamite, Aussie Open and Aaron Henare made their All Elite Wrestling (AEW) debuts, aiding Will Ospreay in attacking FTR and Trent Beretta. They made their in-ring debuts on the 10 June edition of Rampage, where they made their in-ring debuts with Ospreay, where they lost to FTR and Beretta in a 6-man tag-team match.On 27 July, the AEW World Trios Championship was revealed, with Aussie Open and Ospreay being named as participants in the inaugural tournament. On 24 August, Aussie Open and Ospreay defeated Death Triangle (Pac, Rey Fenix and Penta Oscuro) to progress to the semi-finals, where they were defeated by The Elite (The Young Bucks and Kenny Omega) on 31 August.

On 9 March 2023, Fletcher and Davis made their return to Ring of Honor (ROH), which was now AEW's sister promotion, following Tony Khan's purchase of the company, defeating Rhett Titus and Tracy Williams. At Supercard of Honor, The duo competed in the "Reach for the Sky" ladder match for the vacant ROH World Tag Team Championship, but failed to win the match. A week after winning the IWGP Tag Team Championships, Fletcher and Davis made their first title defense against Best Friends, defeating them and retaining the titles on the 14 April edition of Rampage.

==== Championship pursuits and disbandment (2023–2024) ====
On the 10 May edition of Dynamite, Fletcher appeared in a backstage segment, attacking AEW International Champion Orange Cassidy and a championship match between the two took place two weeks later on Dynamite, where Cassidy defeated Fletcher. Shortly after, it was announced that both Fletcher and Davis had signed with AEW.

On 21 July 2023, the duo won the ROH World Tag Team Championships at Death Before Dishonor in a Four-way tag team match. The following week on Ring of Honor, Aussie Open made their first title defence, defeating the Iron Savages. At Dynamite: 200, Aussie Open retained their titles against El Hijo del Vikingo and Komander. On the following week's episode of Rampage, the duo accepted a challenge by Better Than You Bay Bay (Adam Cole and MJF) for the titles on the Zero-Hour of All In. In the lead up to the match, Aussie Open made further title defences against Ethan Page and Isiah Kassidy on the following week on Rampage and The Hardys (Matt and Jeff Hardy) on 23 August on an episode of Dynamite. On the Zero-Hour of All In, Aussie Open lost the ROH World Tag Team Titles to Cole and MJF, ending their reign at 37 days.

Following the loss, the duo shifted their focus towards the AEW World Tag Team Championships, calling out champions FTR on the 16 September edition of Collision, demanding a championship match at WrestleDream. Soon after, the match was made official for the event on 1 October, which was notably the one-year anniversary of the two team's last match, for the IWGP World Tag Team Championships at Royal Quest II. At WrestleDream, FTR defeated Aussie Open, retaining their Championships. After the event, it was revealed that Davis had suffered a wrist injury and would be out of action, leaving Fletcher as a singles wrestler. While Davis was injured, Fletcher joined the Don Callis Family, won the ROH World Television Championship, and turned on Will Ospreay, leaving his status in the United Empire and of Aussie Open in question.

On 30 October 2024, at Fright Night Dynamite, Davis made a surprise return, where he confronted Fletcher over his recent actions. On the 6 November episode of Dynamite, Aussie Open officially disbanded after Fletcher attempted to attack Davis, only to be chased off by Ospreay. On the 5 February 2025 episode of Dynamite, Davis turned heel and joined the Don Callis Family. However, both Fletcher and Davis would continue as singles competitors.

==== Don Callis Family (2026–present) ====
On the 4 March 2026 episode of Dynamite, Davis and Fletcher reunited (without the Aussie Open name) and teamed with stablemate Kazuchika Okada to defeat Jet Set Rodeo ("Hangman" Adam Page, "Speedball" Mike Bailey, and "The Jet" Kevin Knight) and win the AEW World Trios Championship. They would only hold the Trios title for 11 days, losing it to Místico and JetSpeed at Revolution on March 15. On March 28, they have their first tag team match together since their reunion defeating Zachary Wentz and Dezmond Xavier of The Rascalz. During the match, Fletcher suffered a torn mensicus and was expected to miss some time due to this along with additional undisclosed prior injuries. On April 8, AEW president Tony Khan announced that Fletcher would be forced to relinquish the TNT Championship due to injury, ending his second reign at 56 days.

=== Impact Wrestling (2022–2023) ===
On the 8 September edition of Impact!, Aussie Open made their Impact Wrestling debut, defeating Bullet Club's Chris Bey and Ace Austin. The following week, the duo lost to the Motor City Machine Guns. On 30 March, the duo appeared at Multiverse United, competing in a Four-way tag team match for the Impact World Tag Team Championship, however, the titles were retained by Bey and Austin.

== Championships and accomplishments ==
- All Elite Wrestling
  - AEW International Championship (1 time) – Fletcher
  - AEW National Championship (1 time) – Davis
  - AEW TNT Championship (1 time) – Fletcher
  - AEW World Trios Championship (1 time) – with Kazuchika Okada
- ATTACK! Pro Wrestling
  - Attack! 24:7 Championship (7 times) – Fletcher (4) and Davis (3)
  - Attack! Tag Team Championship (2 times)
- Australian Wrestling Alliance
  - AWL Heavyweight Championship (Davis, 2 times)
- DEFIANT Wrestling
  - Defiant Tag Team Championship (2 times)
- Fight Club:PRO
  - FCP Championship (Davis, 1 time)
- HOPE Wrestling
  - HOPE 24/7 Hardcore Championship (9 times) – Fletcher (4) and Davis (5)
  - HOPE Tag Team Championship (1 time)
- Over The Top Wrestling
  - OTT Tag Team Championship (1 time)
- New Japan Pro Wrestling
  - IWGP Tag Team Championship (1 time)
  - Strong Openweight Tag Team Championship (2 times, inaugural)
  - Inaugural Strong Openweight Tag Team Championship Tournament
- Progress Wrestling
  - PROGRESS Tag Team Championship (2 times)
- Pro Wrestling Illustrated
  - Ranked Fletcher No. 188 of the top 500 singles wrestlers in the PWI 500 of 2023
  - Ranked Davis No. 375 of the top 500 singles wrestlers in the PWI 500 of 2020
- Professional Wrestling Alliance
  - PWA Heavyweight Championship (1 time)
  - PWA Tag Team Championship (1 time)
- Revolution Pro Wrestling
  - British Tag Team Championship (2 times)
- Ring of Honor
  - ROH World Tag Team Championship (1 time)
  - ROH World Television Championship (1 time) – Fletcher
- Pro Wrestling Alliance Queensland
  - PWA Queensland Championship (1 time)
- Westside Xtreme Wrestling
  - wXw World Tag Team Championship (2 times)
