= Royal Quest III =

2023 New Japan Pro-Wrestling event

- Official poster of the event
- Promotion: New Japan Pro-Wrestling
- Date: October 14, 2023
- City: London, England
- Venue: Copper Box Arena
- Attendance: 3,191

Event chronology
← Previous; Destruction in Ryōgoku	Next → Fighting Spirit Unleashed

Royal Quest chronology
← Previous; II	Next → IV

Royal Quest III was a professional wrestling event promoted by New Japan Pro-Wrestling (NJPW). The event took place on October 14, 2023, at the Copper Box Arena in London, England and featured wrestlers from Revolution Pro Wrestling (RevPro). It was the first NJPW event to stream live on RevPro OnDemand.

== Production ==
=== Background ===
Royal Quest III was the third event in the Royal Quest chronology, following Royal Quest II.

=== Storylines ===
Royal Quest III featured professional wrestling matches that involved different wrestlers from pre-existing scripted feuds and storylines. Wrestlers portrayed villains, heroes or less distinguishable characters in the scripted events that built tension and culminate in a wrestling match or series of matches.

== Results ==
No.	Results	Stipulations	Times
1	Taiji Ishimori defeated Robbie X by pinfall	Singles match	7:46
2	El Desperado defeated Trent Seven by pinfall	Singles match	8:15
3	Yota Tsuji defeated Luke Jacobs by pinfall	Singles match	8:57
4	Bullet Club War Dogs (Drilla Moloney and Clark Connors) (c) defeated Leon Slater and Cameron Khai by pinfall	Tag team match for the IWGP Junior Heavyweight Tag Team Championship	12:12
5	Guerillas of Destiny (El Phantasmo, Tama Tonga, Tanga Loa) defeated Bullet Club War Dogs (David Finlay, Gabe Kidd and Alex Coughlin) (with Gedo) by pinfall	Six-man tag team match	9:20
6	Ren Narita and Shota Umino defeated United Empire (Francesco Akira and Great-O-Khan) by pinfall	Tag team match	10:27
7	Los Ingobernables de Japon (Bushi and Tetsuya Naito) defeated Just 5 Guys (Douki and Sanada) by pinfall	Tag team match	9:28
8	Hiroshi Tanahashi, Eddie Kingston, and Michael Oku defeated United Empire (TJP, Henare, and Jeff Cobb) by pinfall	Six-man tag team match	10:19
9	Shingo Takagi defeated Tomohiro Ishii by pinfall	Singles match	21:23
10	Will Ospreay (c) defeated Zack Sabre Jr. by pinfall	Singles match for the IWGP United Kingdom Heavyweight Championship (Note: Despite Ospreay renaming the title to IWGP United Kingdom Heavyweight Championship, the match is listed as a IWGP United States Heavyweight Championship title match by NJPW)	31:16
(c) / – the champion(s) heading into the match

== See also ==
- 2023 in professional wrestling
- List of NJPW major events
