= Mark Davis (wrestler) =

Australian professional wrestler (born 1990)

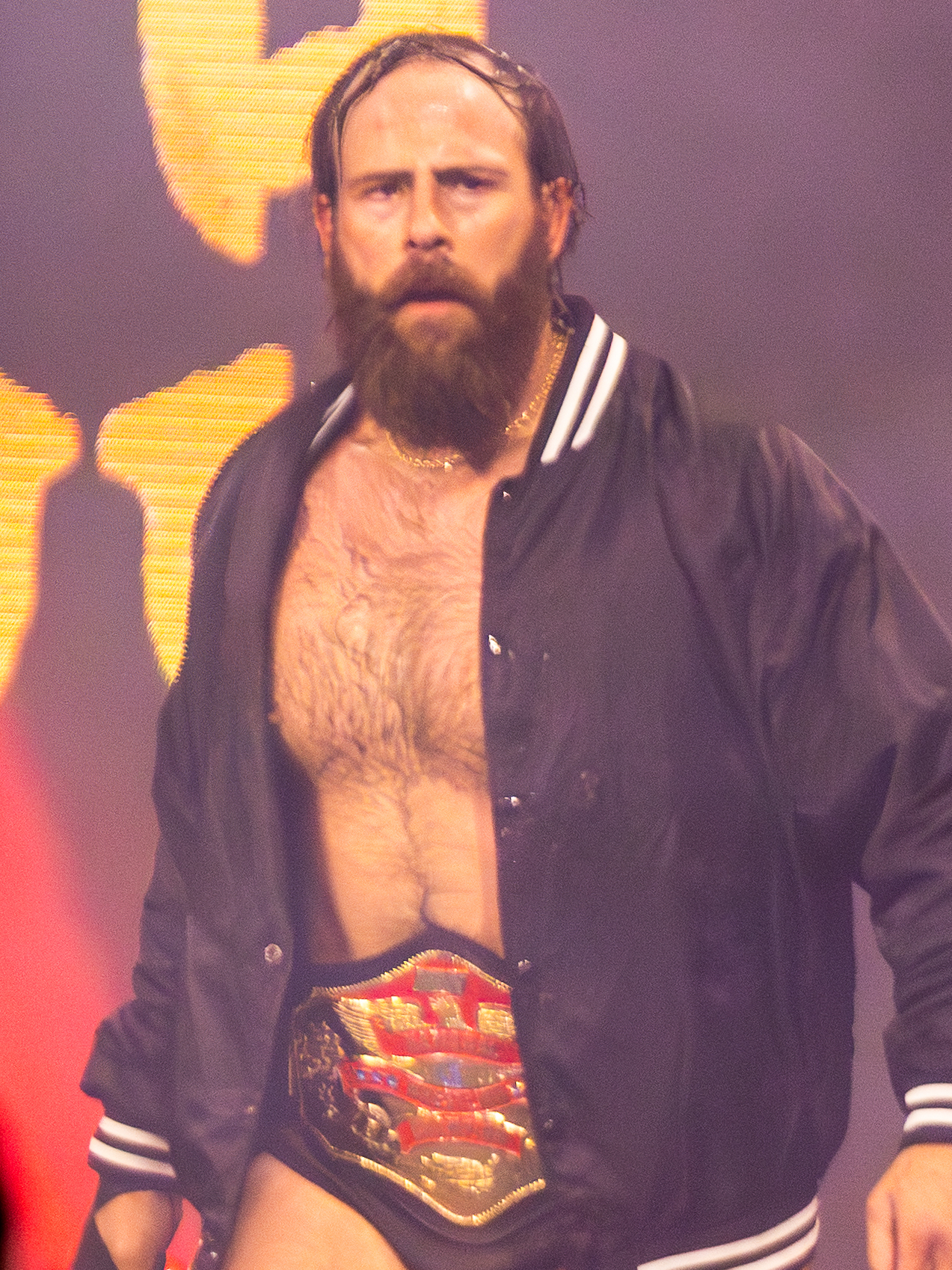
- Davis in 2026

Personal information
- Born: Davis Passfield; 20 August 1990 (age 36) Queensland, Australia

Professional wrestling career
- Ring name: Mark Davis
- Billed height: 6 ft 4 in (1.93 m)
- Billed weight: 240 lb (110 kg)
- Trained by: Travis Banks
- Debut: 2007

Davis Passfield (born 20 August 1990), better known by his ring name Mark Davis, is an Australian professional wrestler. He is signed to All Elite Wrestling (AEW), where he is a member of the Don Callis Family and is a former one-time AEW National Champion and former one-time AEW World Trios Champion with stablemates Kyle Fletcher and Kazuchika Okada. He makes occasional appearances in its sister company Ring of Honor (ROH), where he is a former one-time ROH World Tag Team Champion.

From 2017 to 2024 he teamed with fellow Australian wrestler Kyle Fletcher as the tag team Aussie Open and both were members of the United Empire. They have also made appearances for British independent promotions such as Progress Wrestling, Attack! Pro Wrestling, and Revolution Pro Wrestling, where he is a former two-time Undisputed British Tag Team Champion. Davis commonly made appearances for Australian Independent Promotions from 2007, such as Melbourne City Wrestling, during his early career. For 2019 to 2023, he began working for New Japan Pro-Wrestling (NJPW) with Fletcher as members of the United Empire, where they are former IWGP Tag Team Champions, and record-setting and inaugural two-time Strong Openweight Tag Team Champions. He signed with AEW in 2023.

== Professional wrestling career ==
=== Independent circuit (2007–present) ===
Passfield made his professional wrestling debut in 2007, under the name Mark Davis for Professional Wrestling Alliance. He competed on the Australian Independent Wrestling scene till 2016, working for promotions such as Melbourne City Wrestling, feuding with the likes of Robbie Eagles.

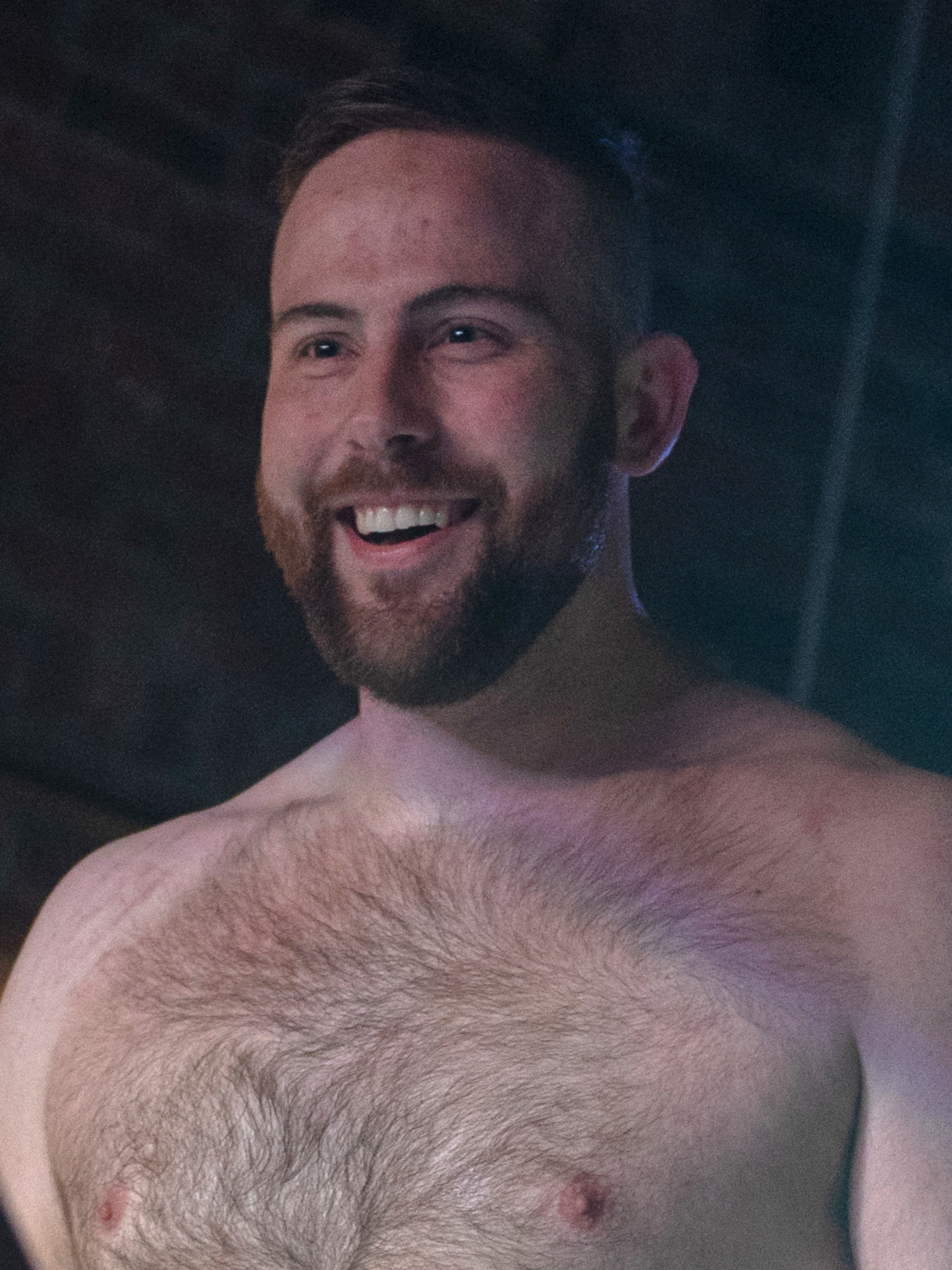
Mark Davis at an indie event in April 2019.

Davis traveled to work in the British Independent Scene in May 2017, commonly working for WhatCulture Pro-Wrestling (WCPW) and Attack! Pro Wrestling. In July 2017, Davis teamed up with fellow Australian wrestler Kyle Fletcher as The Aussie Assault. The two commonly teamed from there on and eventually changed their team name to Aussie Open, competing together across the UK. Aussie Open also competed in Europe, for promotions such as Westside Xtreme Wrestling. In August 2017, Aussie Open made their debuts for Revolution Pro Wrestling and continued to work with them in the long term. This meant that they would work with New Japan Pro-Wrestling talent due to their working agreement with RevPro. Aussie Open commonly faced talent such as Roppongi 3K, who were on a learning excursion from New Japan.

During their tour of the UK in May 2018, Aussie Open made their Ring of Honor debut, losing to Dalton Castle's "boys". On 14 October at Global Wars UK, an inter-promotional event held by RevPro and NJPW, Davis lost to Satoshi Kojima. In March 2019, Aussie Open won the wXw World Tag Team Championship, before losing them to Ilja Dragunov and WALTER, ending their reign at 147 days. They regained the championships 41 days later but had to vacate them after 14 days, due to Davis suffering a leg injury. In May 2019, Aussie Open defeated NJPW's Suzuki-gun (Minoru Suzuki and Zack Sabre Jr.), to win the British Tag Team Championships for the first time. They lost the titles to Sha Samuels and Josh Bodom, ending their reign at 50 days.

=== New Japan Pro-Wrestling (2019–2023) ===
Aussie Open made their New Japan Pro-Wrestling (NJPW) debut at NJPW Royal Quest on 31 August, losing in an IWGP Tag Team Championship match to Guerrillas of Destiny (Tama Tonga and Tanga Loa). Aussie Open wrestled infrequently in 2020, due to the COVID-19 pandemic. In February 2021, Aussie Open returned to Australia, for the first time as a team, wrestling on several independent shows. Aussie Open returned to RevPro on 21 August 2021, and regained the British Tag Team Championships the following month. On 19 September, at RevPro's High Stakes Event, Aussie Open joined Undisputed British Heavyweight Championship Will Ospreay in attacking The Young Guns and Shota Umino, joining the United Empire stable and turning heel. The three consistently began teaming as a trio across the UK. They lost the championships to Roy Knight and Ricky Knight Jr, ending their reign at 63 days. On 10 April 2022, Aussie Open, made their NJPW Strong debuts, teaming with fellow United Empire stablemate, Jeff Cobb to defeat The Mighty Don't Kneel. On 16 April at Windy City Riot, Aussie Open and Cobb, teamed with fellow stablemates, Great-O-Khan, T. J. Perkins and Aaron Henare to defeat Bullet Club representatives, The Good Brothers (Doc Gallows and Karl Anderson), Chris Bey, El Phantasmo and guest member Scott Norton in a 12-man tag-team match. At Capital Collision, Cobb, Henare and Aussie Open lost to TMDK in an 8-man tag-team match.

On the 19 June edition of NJPW Strong Ignition, Aussie Open competed in a tournament to crown the inaugural Strong Openweight Tag Team Championship. In the first round, they defeated The Dark Order's Evil Uno and Alan Angels and they defeated the Stray Dog Army in the semi-finals. In the finals at Strong: High Alert, Davis and Fletcher defeated Christopher Daniels and Yuya Uemura to become the inaugural champions.

At Music City Mayhem, Aussie Open teamed with T. J. Perkins to defeat the team of Alex Zayne and the IWGP Tag Team Champions, FTR. After the match, Aussie Open challenged FTR to a match for the IWGP Tag Team Championships. They received their match at Royal Quest II, where they lost to FTR. At Rumble on 44th Street, Aussie Open lost the Strong Openweight Tag Team Championships to The Motor City Machine Guns in a three-way tag-team match also involving The DKC and Kevin Knight, ending their inaugural reign at 76 days.

Davis and Fletcher would compete individually in the 2023 New Japan Cup in March. Fletcher defeated IWGP Tag Team Champion, Yoshi-Hashi, but was defeated by the other half of the tag-team champions Hirooki Goto. Davis defeated Toru Yano in the first round before losing to United Empire stablemate Will Ospreay in the next round. However, Ospreay would be injured in their match, resulting in Davis advancing to the third round where he would defeat Evil. In the semi-final round, Davis lost to Sanada, thus being eliminated from the tournament. Due to Davis' success in the tournament and Fletcher's victory over Tag Team Champion Yoshi-Hashi, Aussie Open earnt a shot at the IWGP Tag Team Championships, against Bishamon at Sakura Genesis. On 8 April at the event, Aussie Open defeated Bishamon to win their first IWGP Tag Team Championship. On 15 April at Capital Collision, Fletcher and Davis defeated The Motor City Machine Guns and the team of Kazuchika Okada and Hiroshi Tanahashi, in a three-way tag-team match, to regain the Strong Openweight Tag Team Championships for a second time, making them double champions in NJPW. They defended the Strong titles the next night against Lio Rush and Tomohiro Ishii. On 29 April at NJPW Wrestling Satsuma no Kuni, Aussie Open retained the IWGP Tag Team Championships, defeating TMDK (Mikey Nicholls and Shane Haste) On 21 May at Resurgence, Fletcher announced that the team would vacate both titles, due to Mark Davis's injury.

=== All Elite Wrestling / Ring of Honor (2022–present) ===
==== Aussie Open (2022–2024) ====
On the 8 June episode of Dynamite, Aussie Open and Aaron Henare made their All Elite Wrestling (AEW) debuts, aiding Will Ospreay in attacking FTR and Trent Beretta. They made their in-ring debuts on the 10 June edition of Rampage, where they made their in-ring debuts with Ospreay, where they lost to FTR and Beretta in a 6-man tag-team match.On 27 July, the AEW World Trios Championship was revealed, with Aussie Open and Ospreay being named as participants in the inaugural tournament. On 24 August, Aussie Open and Ospreay defeated Death Triangle (Pac, Rey Fenix and Penta Oscuro) to progress to the semi-finals, where they were defeated by The Elite (The Young Bucks and Kenny Omega) on 31 August.

On 9 March 2023, Fletcher and Davis made their return to Ring of Honor (ROH), which was now AEW's sister promotion, following Tony Khan's purchase of the company, defeating Rhett Titus and Tracy Williams. At Supercard of Honor, The duo competed in the "Reach for the Sky" ladder match for the vacant ROH World Tag Team Championship, but failed to win the match. A week after winning the IWGP Tag Team Championships, Fletcher and Davis made their first title defense against Best Friends, defeating them and retaining the titles on the 14 April edition of Rampage.

On the 10 May edition of Dynamite, Fletcher appeared in a backstage segment, attacking AEW International Champion Orange Cassidy and a championship match between the two took place two weeks later on Dynamite, where Cassidy defeated Fletcher. Shortly after, it was announced that both Fletcher and Davis had signed with AEW.

On 21 July 2023, the duo won the ROH World Tag Team Championships at Death Before Dishonor in a Four-way tag team match. The following week on Ring of Honor, Aussie Open made their first title defence, defeating the Iron Savages. At Dynamite: 200, Aussie Open retained their titles against El Hijo del Vikingo and Komander. On the following week's episode of Rampage, the duo accepted a challenge by Better Than You Bay Bay (Adam Cole and MJF) for the titles on the Zero-Hour of All In. In the lead up to the match, Aussie Open made further title defences against Ethan Page and Isiah Kassidy on the following week on Rampage and The Hardys (Matt and Jeff Hardy) on 23 August on an episode of Dynamite. On the Zero-Hour of All In, Aussie Open lost the ROH World Tag Team Titles to Cole and MJF, ending their reign at 37 days.

Following the loss, the duo shifted their focus towards the AEW World Tag Team Championships, calling out champions FTR on the 16 September edition of Collision, demanding a championship match at WrestleDream. Soon after, the match was made official for the event on 1 October, which was notably the one-year anniversary of the two team's last match, for the IWGP World Tag Team Championships at Royal Quest II. At WrestleDream, FTR defeated Aussie Open, retaining their Championships. After the event, it was revealed that Davis had suffered a wrist injury and would be out of action.

On October 30, 2024 at Fright Night Dynamite, Davis made a surprise return, where he confronted Fletcher over his recent actions, such as joining the Don Callis Family and betraying Will Ospreay. On the 6 November episode of Dynamite, Aussie Open officially disbanded after Fletcher attempted to attack Davis, only to be chased off by Ospreay.

==== Don Callis Family (2025–present) ====
On the February 5, 2025 episode of Dynamite, Davis was revealed as the newest member of the Don Callis Family, turning heel in the process. On March 9 at Revolution, Davis attempted to assist Fletcher in his match against Ospreay, but was unsuccessful. On the March 26 episode of Dynamite, Davis was defeated by Powerhouse Hobbs. It was later reported that Davis suffered a fractured foot during the match, putting him out of action for an indefinite amount of time. On the October 11 episode of Collision, Davis returned from injury, attacking Kota Ibushi only to be run off by Kenny Omega.

In January 2026, Davis formed a tag team with stablemate Jake Doyle and the duo would win a four-way tag team match at Dynamite: Maximum Carnage on January 14 to earn an AEW World Tag Team Championship opportunity. On the January 28 episode of Dynamite, Davis and Doyle failed to win the tag titles from FTR. On the March 4 episode of Dynamite, Davis won his first AEW title, winning the AEW World Trios Championship with Kazuchika Okada and Kyle Fletcher by defeating Jet Set Rodeo ("Hangman" Adam Page, "Speedball" Mike Bailey, and "The Jet" Kevin Knight). They would only hold the Trios title for 11 days, losing it to Místico and JetSpeed at Revolution on March 15. On May 9 at Fairway to Hell, after an interference from Ricochet, Davis defeated Jack Perry to win the AEW National Championship, marking his first singles title in AEW. At Supercard of Honor on May 15, Davis successfully defended his title against Xelhua. On July 26 at Redemption, Davis lost his title to Andrade El Idolo, ending his reign at 78 days. On the October 21 episode of Dynamite, Davis and Doyle defeated the reigning AEW World Tag Team Champions The Young Bucks (Matt Jackson and Nick Jackson) in a championship eliminator match, earning a future title opportunity. On November 4, Davis and his stablemates competed in a Blood and Guts match at the namesake event, where they were victorious. At Full Gear on November 14, Davis and Doyle failed to win the tag titles from The Young Bucks.

== Championships and accomplishments ==
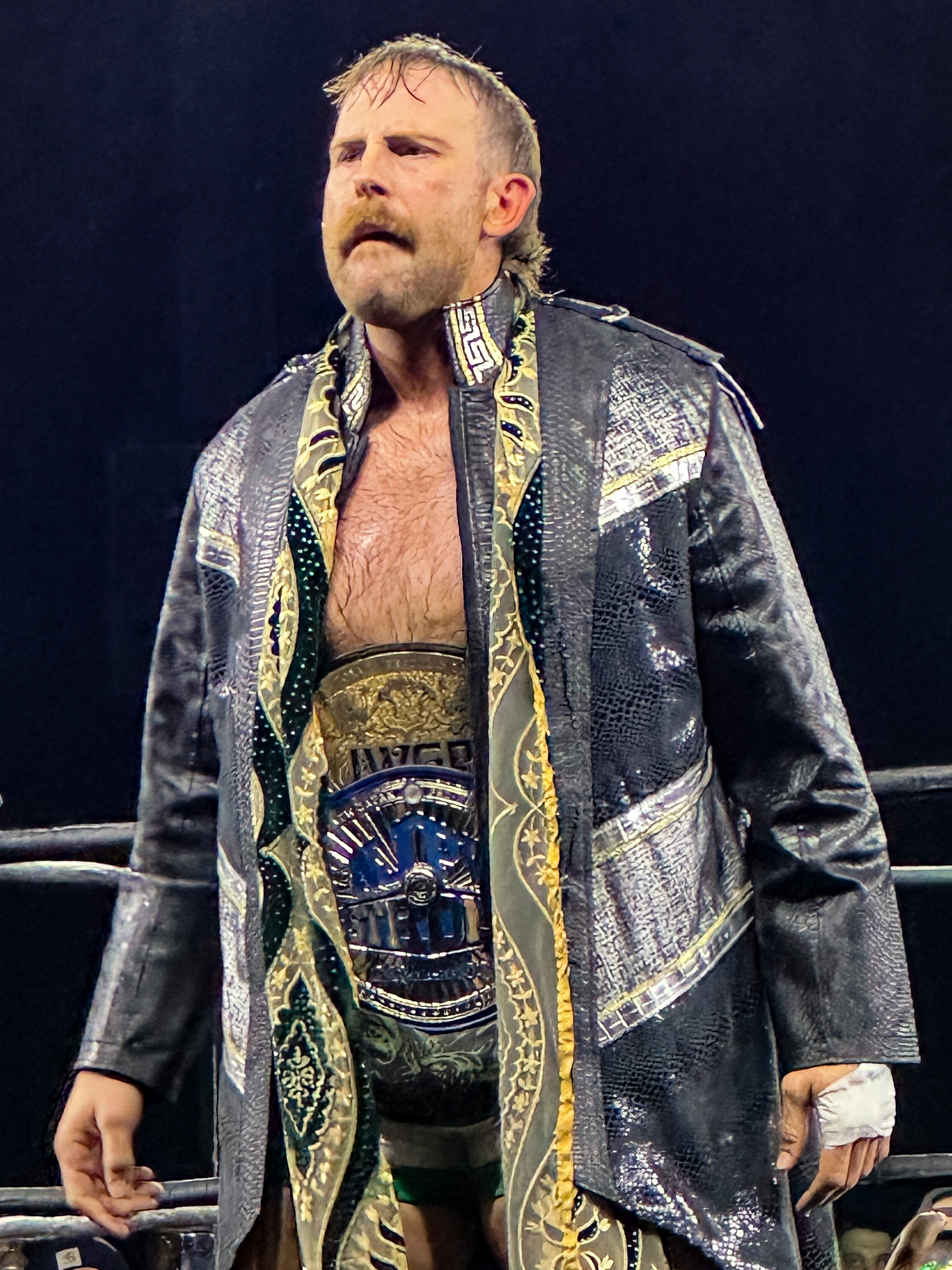
Davis is a one-time IWGP Tag Team and two-time Strong Openweight Tag Team Champion

- All Elite Wrestling
  - AEW National Championship (1 time)
  - AEW World Trios Championship (1 time) – with Kyle Fletcher and Kazuchika Okada
- Australian Wrestling League
  - AWL Heavyweight Championship (2 times)
- ATTACK! Pro Wrestling
  - ATTACK! 24:7 Championship (3 times)
  - ATTACK! Tag Team Championship (2 times) – with Kyle Fletcher
- Defiant Wrestling
  - Defiant Tag Team Championship (2 times) – with Kyle Fletcher
- Fight Club:PRO
  - FCP Championship (1 time)
  - Infinity Tournament (2018)
- HOPE Wrestling
  - HOPE 24/7 Hardcore Championship (5 times)
  - HOPE Tag Team Championship (1 time) – with Kyle Fletcher
- National Wrestling Alliance Australian Wrestling Alliance
  - NWA AWA Heavyweight Championship (2 times)
- New Japan Pro Wrestling
  - Strong Openweight Tag Team Championship (2 times, inaugural) – with Kyle Fletcher
  - Inaugural Strong Openweight Tag Team Championship Tournament (2022) – with Kyle Fletcher
  - IWGP Tag Team Championship (1 time) – with Kyle Fletcher
- Over The Top Wrestling
  - OTT Tag Team Championship (1 time) – with Kyle Fletcher
- PROGRESS Wrestling
  - PROGRESS Tag Team Championship (2 times) – with Kyle Fletcher
  - Natural Progression Series V (2018)
- Professional Wrestling Alliance
  - PWA Heavyweight Championship (1 time)
  - PWA Tag Team Championship (1 time) – with Kyle Fletcher
- Pro Wrestling Alliance Queensland
  - PWA Queensland Championship (2 time)
- Pro Wrestling Illustrated
  - Ranked No. 74 of the top singles wrestlers in the PWI 500 in 2026
  - Faction of the Year (2025) as part of the Don Callis Family
- Revolution Pro Wrestling
  - British Tag Team Championship (2 times) – with Kyle Fletcher
- Ring of Honor
  - ROH World Tag Team Championship (1 time) – with Kyle Fletcher
- Westside Xtreme Wrestling
  - wXw World Tag Team Championship (2 times) – with Kyle Fletcher
  - Road To 16 Carat Gold (2019)
