= Royal Quest IV =

2024 New Japan Pro-Wrestling event

- Official poster of the event
- Promotion: New Japan Pro-Wrestling
- Date: October 20, 2024
- City: London, England
- Venue: Crystal Palace National Sports Centre
- Attendance: 1,544

Event chronology
← Previous; King of Pro-Wrestling	Next → Power Struggle

Royal Quest chronology
← Previous; III	Next → —

Royal Quest IV was a professional wrestling event promoted by New Japan Pro-Wrestling (NJPW). The event took place on October 20, 2024, at the Crystal Palace National Sports Centre in London, England and featured wrestlers from Revolution Pro Wrestling (RevPro).

== Production ==
=== Background ===
Royal Quest IV was the fourth event in the Royal Quest chronology, following Royal Quest III.

=== Storylines ===
Royal Quest IV featured professional wrestling matches that involved different wrestlers from pre-existing scripted feuds and storylines. Wrestlers portrayed villains, heroes or less distinguishable characters in the scripted events that built tension and culminate in a wrestling match or series of matches.

== Results ==
No.	Results	Stipulations	Times
1^{P}	Young Blood (Yuto Nakashima and Oskar Leube) defeated Greedy Souls (Brendan White and Danny Jones)	Tag team match	12:05
2	Bullet Club (Taiji Ishimori and Robbie X) defeated CPF (Joe Lando and Danny Black)	Tag team match	7:57
3	AZM and Dani Luna defeated Mina Shirakawa and Kanji	Tag team match	8:58
4	Kosei Fujita defeated Michael Oku	Singles match	9:57
5	Yota Tsuji defeated Drilla Moloney	Singles match	13:55
6	Shota Umino defeated Callum Newman	Singles match	16:44
7	Taka Michinoku defeated Gedo (with David Finlay)	Singles match	2:15
8	David Finlay defeated Taka Michinoku	Singles match	1:14
9	Los Ingobernables de Japon (Tetsuya Naito, Hiromu Takahashi and Titán) defeated TMDK (Ryohei Oiwa and Robbie Eagles) and Máscara Dorada	Six-man tag team match	11:37
10	TMDK (Mikey Nicholls and Shane Haste) (c) defeated Hiroshi Tanahashi and Tomohiro Ishii	Tag team match for the Strong Openweight Tag Team Championship	15:58
11	Zack Sabre Jr. (c) defeated Sanada	Singles match for the IWGP World Heavyweight Championship	25:34
(c) / – the champion(s) heading into the match; P / – the match was broadcast on the pre-show

== See also ==
- 2024 in professional wrestling
- List of NJPW major events
