= Rumble on 44th Street =

2022 New Japan Pro-Wrestling professional wrestling event

- Promotional poster featuring various wrestlers
- Promotion: New Japan Pro-Wrestling
- Date: October 28, 2022
- City: New York City, New York
- Venue: Palladium Times Square
- Attendance: 982

Event chronology
← Previous; Declaration of Power	Next → Battle Autumn '22

Rumble on 44th Street was a professional wrestling event produced by New Japan Pro-Wrestling (NJPW). It took place on October 28, 2022, in New York City at the Palladium Times Square.

The event was preceded by a Halloween inspired event named The Night Before Rumble on 44th Street on October 27.

== Storylines ==
Rumble on 44th Street featured professional wrestling matches that involve different wrestlers from pre-existing scripted feuds and storylines. Wrestlers portrayed villains, heroes, or less distinguishable characters in the scripted events that built tension and culminated in a wrestling match or series of matches.

=== Event ===
A supplemental show, entitled The Night Before Rumble on 44th Street: A Halloween Special, as the name implies, was held the night before the main show on October 27, 2022. No matches were deliberately announced in advance to keep the show a mystery for fans. The show featured many surprises, such as a reunion of the Forever Hooligans tag team as Alex Koslov came out of retirement for one night only, Strong Openweight Champion Fred Rosser facing off against former World Championship Wrestling wrestler Crowbar, and a 12-man elimination tag team match in the main event, featuring the likes of IWGP World Heavyweight Champion Jay White, Kazuchika Okada, Homicide, and wrestlers from All Elite Wrestling, such as Eddie Kingston and AEW World Champion Jon Moxley.

The event hosted the presence of several World Wonder Ring Stardom wrestlers. The pre-show of the event saw Cosmic Angels unit members Mina Shirakawa and Waka Tsukiyama unsuccessfully challenging Kylie Rae and Tiara James. Stars unit leader Mayu Iwatani successfully defended the SWA World Championship against KiLynn King. In the second match, Yujiro Takahashi and Sho defeated Rocky Romero and Yoh. After the match, Lio Rush showed up to help the Chaos members. Alex Coughlin returned after the second match and announced his participation in the World Tag League. Ken Shamrock escorted Clark Connors to the ring. A staredown ensued between the two Pancrase legends following Suzuki's win. In the end, however, the two hugged.

== Results ==
The Night Before Rumble on 44th Street
No.	Results	Stipulations	Times
1	The DKC and Kevin Knight defeated Forever Hooligans (Alex Koslov and Rocky Romero)	Tag team match	16:02
2	Fred Rosser defeated Crowbar	Singles match	14:43
3	Aussie Open (Kyle Fletcher and Mark Davis) defeated The S.A.T. (Joel Maximo and Jose Maximo)	Tag team match	7:44
4	Mike Bailey defeated Mascara Dorada, Mighty Monte and Smiley	Four-way match	9:38
5	Minoru Suzuki defeated Tracy Williams	Singles match	13:14
6	Shingo Takagi defeated Jake Something	Singles match	14:17
7	Chaos (Kazuchika Okada and Yoh), Amazing Red, Jon Moxley, Eddie Kingston and Homicide defeated Bullet Club (Jay White, Juice Robinson and El Phantasmo) and Team Filthy (Tom Lawlor and West Coast Wrecking Crew (Royce Isaacs and Jorel Nelson))	Twelve-man elimination tag team match	29:14

Rumble on 44th Street
No.	Results	Stipulations	Times
1^{P}	Kylie Rae and Tiara James defeated Cosmic Angels (Mina Shirakawa and Waka Tsukiyama)	Tag team match	12:08
2	House of Torture (Yujiro Takahashi and Sho) defeated Chaos (Rocky Romero and Yoh)	Tag team match	7:42
3	The Motor City Machine Guns (Alex Shelley and Chris Sabin) defeated Aussie Open (Kyle Fletcher and Mark Davis) (c) and Kevin Knight and The DKC	Three-way match for the Strong Openweight Tag Team Championship	13:42
4	Fred Rosser (c) defeated Jonathan Gresham	Singles match for the Strong Openweight Championship	14:37
5	Homicide, Wheeler Yuta and Shota Umino defeated Team Filthy (Tom Lawlor and West Coast Wrecking Crew (Royce Isaacs and Jorel Nelson))	Six-man tag team match	12:15
6	Minoru Suzuki defeated Clark Connors (with Ken Shamrock)	Singles match	15:50
7	Mayu Iwatani (c) defeated KiLynn King	Singles match for the SWA World Championship	11:47
8	Shingo Takagi (c) defeated El Phantasmo	New York City Street Fight for the Provisional KOPW Championship	20:59
9	Bullet Club (Jay White and Juice Robinson) defeated Kazuchika Okada and Eddie Kingston	Tag team match	20:15
(c) / – the champion(s) heading into the match; P / – the match was broadcast on the pre-show
