= FTR (professional wrestling) =

Professional wrestling tag team

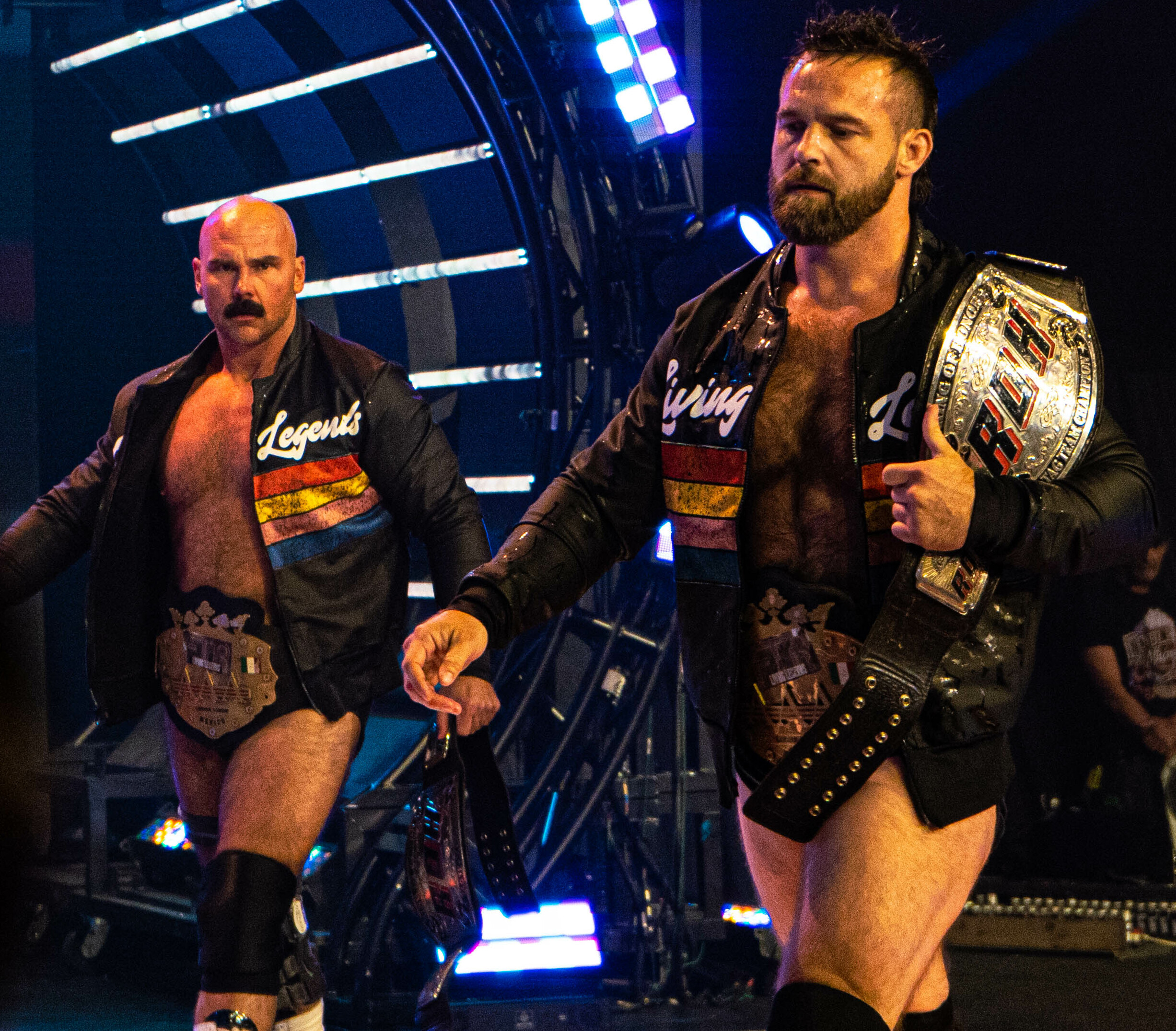
- FTR, Dax Harwood (left) and Cash Wheeler (right) in 2022

Tag team
- Name(s): Dash and Dawson; FTR; The Mechanics; The Revival; Las Super Ranas; Super Frogs
- Members: Dax Harwood/Scott Dawson; Cash Wheeler/Dash Wilder
- Manager: Stokely
- Billed heights: 5 ft 10 in (1.78 m) each
- Combined billed weight: 446 lb (202 kg)
- Billed from: Asheville, North Carolina; Guadalajara, Jalisco, México; Kill Devil Hills, North Carolina
- Former members: Tully Blanchard (manager)
- Debut: July 17, 2014
- Years active: 2014–present

FTR (often stylized as #FTR) is an American professional wrestling tag team consisting of Dax Harwood and Cash Wheeler, with Stokely serving as their manager. They are signed to All Elite Wrestling (AEW), where they are former three-time AEW World Tag Team Champions. They also appear in Revolution Pro Wrestling (RevPro), where they are the current Undisputed British Tag Team Champions in their first reign.

The team was created by Dusty Rhodes in 2014, then as The Mechanics, and later simply Dash and Dawson when they made their television debut on WWE NXT. The team adopted the name The Revival in 2016, referencing reviving the classic tag-team wrestling style of the 1980s, which has led to the two being compared favorably to the Brain Busters (Arn Anderson and Tully Blanchard) and The Midnight Express, particularly the Condrey/Eaton version, two of the top teams of all time. The team uses the phrase "No flips, just fists" to convey their more traditional, mat based in-ring style in contrast to the more high flying style of some contemporary teams.

They are the first team to have won WWE's Raw Tag Team Championship (held twice), SmackDown Tag Team Championship (once), and NXT Tag Team Championship (twice), and are recognized by WWE as being the company's first-ever WWE Tag Team Triple Crown winners. After being released by WWE in April 2020, and signing with AEW the next month, they made their AEW debut on the May 27, 2020, episode of Dynamite, winning the AEW World Tag Team Championship the following September at AEW's All Out.

Upon arriving in AEW, the duo took the name of FTR, alternately using the letters to mean "Forever The Revival", "F*** The Rest", "Fear The Revolt", or "For The Revolution" as WWE had ownership rights to the name "The Revival". The initialism is also a reference to "Fuck the Revival", an inside joke and catch-phrase coined by Cody Rhodes on the YouTube series Being the Elite. It was later revealed that it stood for Fuck The Rest, as noted in their shirts and their theme music video. That year, Pro Wrestling Illustrated ranked them number one on their inaugural PWI Tag Team 50 list.

In 2022, due to AEW co-owner Tony Khan's purchase of Ring of Honor (ROH), and AEW's partnerships with New Japan Pro-Wrestling (NJPW) and Mexico's Lucha Libre AAA Worldwide (AAA), FTR would win the ROH World Tag Team Championship, NJPW's IWGP Tag Team Championship, and the AAA World Tag Team Championship - holding all three titles simultaneously for the bulk of the year. All totaled between WWE, AEW, ROH, AAA, and NJPW, FTR are nine-time world tag team champions, making them the only team to have held championships in all five promotions. They are also the only people to have jointly won the WWE 24/7 Championship.

== History ==
=== WWE (2014–2020) ===
==== Origins and formation (2014–2015) ====
Daniel Wheeler and David Harwood were longtime friends before being made into a team, and had wrestled together on the independent circuit. In 2012, Harwood was hired by WWE based in part on a match he previously had with Wheeler, and performed there under the name Scott Dawson, mostly in tag team matches on NXT and live shows. Wheeler had hoped to join WWE, with the two also hoping to form a tag team there. In 2014, Wheeler joined the WWE Performance Center, and on his very first day of promo training, performed a promo with Dawson; WWE producer Dusty Rhodes immediately became convinced that the two needed to become a team. According to a May 2020 interview of the duo, Rhodes was not only highly influential in both the creation and development of the team, but had "unwavering faith" in them even as some of the other coaches had doubts, and was their "biggest supporter and pushed for [them] harder than anybody" until his passing in 2015.

Wheeler and Harwood, who were both from North Carolina, acknowledged that their southern accents contributed to the lack of faith some coaches had for them at the Performance Center (with WWE chairman Vince McMahon's dislike for southern accents being well-known backstage). They were notably told that they would not get to do many promos, although Rhodes, a fellow resident of North Carolina, insisted that they should.

In 2014, after returning from injury, Harwood, now going by the name Scott Dawson, teamed up with a debuting Wheeler, who performed under the name Dash Wilder, with the two performing extensively at live events under the ring name The Mechanics. The duo resurfaced and picked up their first televised win on the July 29, 2015 episode of NXT, defeating Enzo Amore and Colin Cassady. At NXT TakeOver: Respect, The Mechanics were defeated in the semi-finals of the Dusty Rhodes Tag Team Classic by eventual winners Finn Bálor and Samoa Joe. In the following weeks, the team name was changed to "Dash and Dawson". On the October 28 episode of NXT, Dash and Dawson attacked Amore and Cassady before their match, completely laying out Amore while decimating Cass' knee, leaving him unable to compete.

==== NXT Tag Team Champions (2015–2017) ====
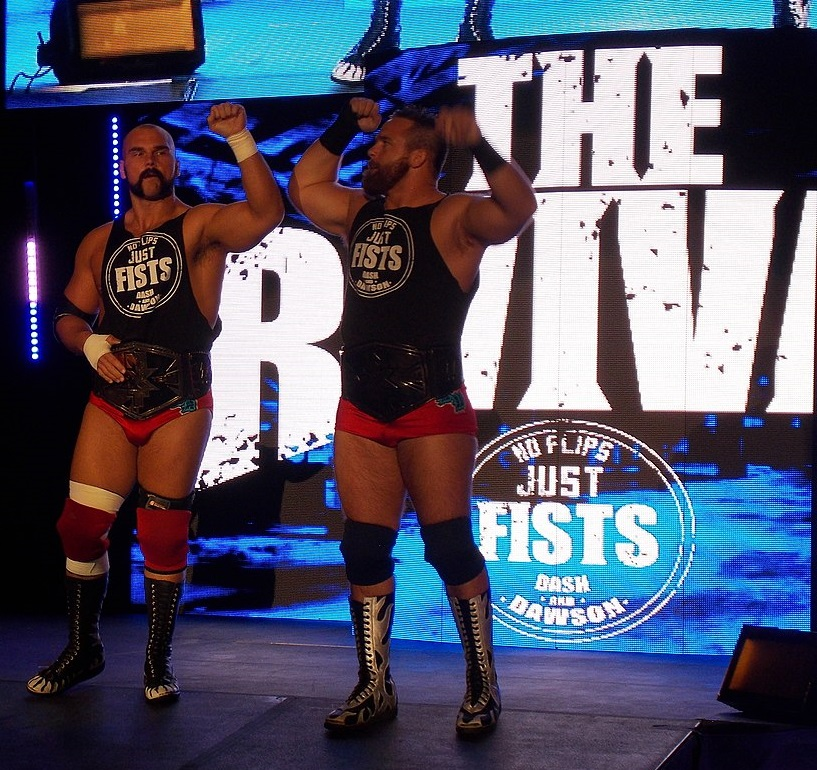
Scott Dawson (left) and Dash Wilder (right), as NXT Tag Team Champions in 2016

Due to an earlier non-title victory over the NXT Tag Team Champions, The Vaudevillains, Dash and Dawson earned a title match on the November 11 episode of NXT, and won the match to become the NXT Tag Team Champions for the first time. They made their first successful title defense two weeks later, defeating The Vaudevillians in a rematch. Afterwards, they successfully defended their titles against Amore and Cassady at NXT TakeOver: London. Beginning in February 2016, Dash and Dawson began performing under the team name The Revival.

The Revival made their first appearance on WWE's main roster at Roadblock, successfully defending their championships against Amore and Cassady. On April 1 at NXT TakeOver: Dallas, The Revival lost the NXT Tag Team Championship to American Alpha (Chad Gable and Jason Jordan), ending their reign at 142 days. On June 8 at NXT TakeOver: The End, The Revival regained the titles from American Alpha, thus becoming the first team to win the NXT Tag Team Championship twice. On the July 6 episode of NXT, The Revival defeated American Alpha in a two-out-of-three falls match to retain the titles. At NXT TakeOver: Brooklyn II, they retained their titles over Johnny Gargano and Tommaso Ciampa. In a universally acclaimed rematch against Gargano and Ciampa (now called DIY) at NXT TakeOver: Toronto, The Revival lost their tag team titles in a two-out-of-three falls match after scoring the first fall via pinfall, ending their second reign at 164 days. The match was later named "WWE Match of the Year" for 2016. At NXT TakeOver: Orlando, The Revival lost to The Authors of Pain (Akam and Rezar) in a triple threat elimination match for the NXT Tag Team Championship that also featured DIY, in what would be their last match in NXT.

==== Raw Tag Team Champions (2017–2019) ====
On the April 3 episode of Raw, The Revival made their main roster debut, defeating The New Day. The following week on Raw, they defeated The New Day once again. On April 14, Wilder subsequently suffered a fractured jaw during a live event, and was estimated to be out for eight weeks, putting the team on a temporary hiatus. On the July 10 episode of Raw, The Revival attacked The Hardy Boyz (Matt and Jeff Hardy) after their match against Luke Gallows and Karl Anderson, and became embroiled in a three-way feud; however, shortly afterwards, Dawson suffered a ruptured bicep, putting him out of action for an estimated five months.

The Revival returned again on the December 18 episode of Raw, defeating Heath Slater and Rhyno. At Raw 25, The Revival lost to Luke Gallows and Karl Anderson, marking their first defeat on the main roster. On January 28, 2018 at the Royal Rumble pre-show, The Revival defeated Gallows and Anderson. On SummerSlam pre-show, The Revival lost to The B-Team (Bo Dallas and Curtis Axel) in an attempt to become the Raw Tag Team Champions. At Survivor Series, they were part of Team Raw, but lost to Team SmackDown in the 10-on-10 Survivor Series tag team elimination match. The Revival were the final team eliminated in the match.

Following this they began a feud against Lucha House Party (Kalisto, Gran Metalik and Lince Dorado) and suffered various losses in handicap matches labeled "Lucha House Rules". On the December 17 episode of Raw, The Revival defeated Lucha House Party, The B-Team and Authors of Pain (Akam and Rezar) in a fatal-4-way match, earning a shot at the Raw Tag Team Championship. Throughout the next two weeks, The Revival faced Bobby Roode and Chad Gable for the titles, but Dawson and Wilder were unsuccessful in winning the titles in controversial fashion each time. Shortly after, Dave Meltzer of The Wrestling Observer reported that the duo asked for their release from their WWE contracts. This information was reported following their bout against Lucha House Party on the January 14, 2019 episode of Raw.

On the February 11 episode of Raw, The Revival finally defeated Roode and Gable for the titles, marking their first tag team championship win on the main roster. The following two weeks on Raw, The Revival were booked to lose to two different teams from NXT. This string of losses included against DIY and the team of Ricochet and Aleister Black. The team successfully defended their titles against Black and Ricochet and Roode and Gable at Fastlane, when Dawson pinned Gable. At WrestleMania 35, The Revival lost their titles to Curt Hawkins and Zack Ryder, ending their reign at 55 days. The following night on Raw, The Revival fought Hawkins and Ryder in a rematch, but failed to regain the titles. At The Shield's Final Chapter, The Revival once again unsuccessfully fought Hawkins and Ryder for the tag team championship in a triple threat match also involving Aleister Black and Ricochet.

After being drafted to Raw in the Superstar Shake-up, The Usos began a rivalry with Dawson and Wilder where The Usos would repeatedly embarrass The Revival on numerous occasions. On the May 20 episode of Raw, The Revival defeated The Usos. At Super ShowDown, The Revival lost the rematch. On the following episode of Raw, The Revival defeated Hawkins and Ryder, and The Usos in a triple threat tag team match to win the Raw Tag Team Championships for a second time. The Revival defeated The Usos at Extreme Rules to retain the tag titles. On July 29 episode of Raw, they lost the titles to Luke Gallows and Karl Anderson in a triple threat match that also involved the Usos, ending their second reign at 49 days. On the August 12, 2019 post-Summerslam episode of "Raw", during a scheduled tag team match where The Revival were facing Lucha House Party (Lince Dorado and Gran Metalik, with Kalisto), the 24/7 champion R-Truth ran out from backstage, being chased by several wrestlers. The match was called off and The Revival performed a "Hart Attack" on Truth and simultaneously pinned him to become the first co-champions of the 24/7 Championship. However, in the same night, R-Truth pinned Dawson, with the help of Carmella, to regain the title.

==== SmackDown Tag Team Champions (2019–2020) ====
Following SummerSlam, The Revival began to appear on SmackDown Live, aligning themselves with Randy Orton in a feud against The New Day (Big E, Kofi Kingston, and Xavier Woods). On September 15 at Clash of Champions, The Revival defeated The New Day's Big E and Woods to capture the SmackDown Tag Team Championship, making them the first team to hold the Raw, SmackDown, and NXT Tag Team Championships, and thus the first-ever WWE Tag Team Triple Crown Champions. As part of the draft, The Revival was drafted to the SmackDown brand. As Randy Orton had become drafted to the Raw brand, this signified the end of The Revival's alliance with Orton. On the November 8 episode of SmackDown, The Revival lost the SmackDown Tag Team titles back to The New Day's Big E and Kingston, ending their reign at 54 days. They received a rematch for the titles at TLC: Tables, Ladders & Chairs, but was again defeated by The New Day. Later that same night, The Revival also aligned themselves with King Corbin, assisting him in defeating Roman Reigns, but that alliance ended quietly.

On the January 31, 2020 episode of SmackDown, The Revival lost to John Morrison and the Miz in a fatal four-way tag team match also involving Heavy Machinery (Otis and Tucker) and Lucha House Party, in a match where the winner would earn a Smackdown Tag Team Championship match at Super ShowDown; this was The Revival's final televised match in WWE. On the February 7, 2020 episode of SmackDown, they attacked Intercontinental Champion Braun Strowman alongside Sami Zayn and Shinsuke Nakamura, in their final appearances in WWE.

On April 10, The Revival were granted their releases from WWE, fifteen months after their request in January 2019. In an interview the following month, the duo explained that they had asked for their releases because "the tag team division doesn't get respect, it doesn't get the time that we think a lot of these teams deserve and we want to take chances on ourselves", and that they felt that otherwise they would have "no legacy aside from our NXT stuff". They also stated: "The tag team titles, they don't really mean anything", pointing out that Braun Strowman had "steam-rolled the entire tag team division" by himself before winning the Raw Tag Team Championship with 10-year old non-wrestler Nicholas Cone, a son of WWE referee John Cone, at WrestleMania 34. According to the duo, WWE management originally thought that The Revival was bluffing in order to receive a push, and that the push they received shortly after (they won the Raw Tag Team Championship the following month, with three more title wins later the same year) was a result of it, even after they repeatedly insisted that they did not want to win titles because they believed WWE's tag team championships were meaningless.

During the two's last months in the company, Vince McMahon personally designed an entirely new gimmick for The Revival. However, the duo found the proposed characters "less than flattering", with Wilder stating that he laughed out loud when McMahon gave them pictures displaying their offered new looks. The designs, which have since leaked online, had the two wearing lipstick, bright colors and tassels and carrying glow sticks, with Wilder also wearing suspenders and a large "Shatter Machine" sign on a chain necklace. The duo stated that they had immediately told McMahon that these new characters were "bad", and that while they would portray them if WWE wanted, they would still leave the company once their contracts expired in June 2020. In the same May 2020 interview, Wheeler and Harwood stated their belief that this was the moment McMahon and WWE executives realized that the two actually intended to leave the company; this resulted in The Revival being permanently taken off-television until their release.

Following their departure from WWE, the team released a video on their social media pages using the new catchphrase "Fear The Revolt" (FTR); this resulted in their new ring name being largely reported to be The Revolt. Furthermore, Wilder changed his ring name to Cash Wheeler while Dawson changed his to Dax Harwood (with both now using their real-life last names, while Wheeler was now using the first name he originally wanted in WWE).

On May 10, 2020, the duo received a cease and desist letter over the usage of the name "The Revolt" by the attorney of Caleb Konley and Zane Riley, a duo who had been using the name on the independent circuit since 2015; the letter stated that "[Wheeler and Harwood's] conduct is not only unlawful, it is truly shameless that they would willfully steal a name from those that worked so hard to build it up". A letter sent by Wheeler and Harwood's attorney, Michael E. Dockins, the following day, announced that Wheeler and Harwood's team name was not The Revolt but "FTR", which "would mean different things depending on their storyline and creatives", and that they could keep using the "Fear The Revolt" catchphrase regardless. While Konley and Riley claim that Wheeler and Harwood, who knew them personally, knew about their previous use of the Revolt name, Dockins stated that his clients "were not aware of and, at worst, have no recollection of ever knowing of [Konley and Riley]'s claimed rights in a REVOLT-inclusive trademark."

=== All Elite Wrestling / Ring of Honor (2020–present) ===
==== Debut and The Pinnacle (2020–2021) ====
On the May 27, 2020 episode of Dynamite, Dawson and Wilder, now under the names Dax Harwood and Cash Wheeler made their All Elite Wrestling (AEW) debut as FTR, saving The Young Bucks from an attack by The Butcher and The Blade. They made their in-ring debut on the June 10 episode of Dynamite, defeating The Butcher and The Blade. In July, the duo signed multi-year contracts with AEW.

On the August 12 episode of Dynamite, FTR attacked The Rock 'n' Roll Express during Tag Team Appreciation Night, turning heel and subsequently aligning themselves with Tully Blanchard, who became their manager. On August 27, they won a tag team gauntlet match on Dynamite to earn a match for the AEW World Tag Team Championship at All Out. At All Out on September 5, FTR defeated Kenny Omega and Hangman Page to win the titles for the first time. They lost the championship to The Young Bucks at Full Gear on November 7.

On the March 10, 2021 episode of Dynamite, FTR and Blanchard joined MJF, Wardlow and Shawn Spears in attacking The Inner Circle, establishing the faction The Pinnacle. At Blood and Guts on May 5, The Pinnacle defeated The Inner Circle in the inaugural Blood and Guts match. At Double or Nothing on May 30, The Pinnacle lost to The Inner Circle in a Stadium Stampede match.

==== Championship reigns (2021–2026) ====
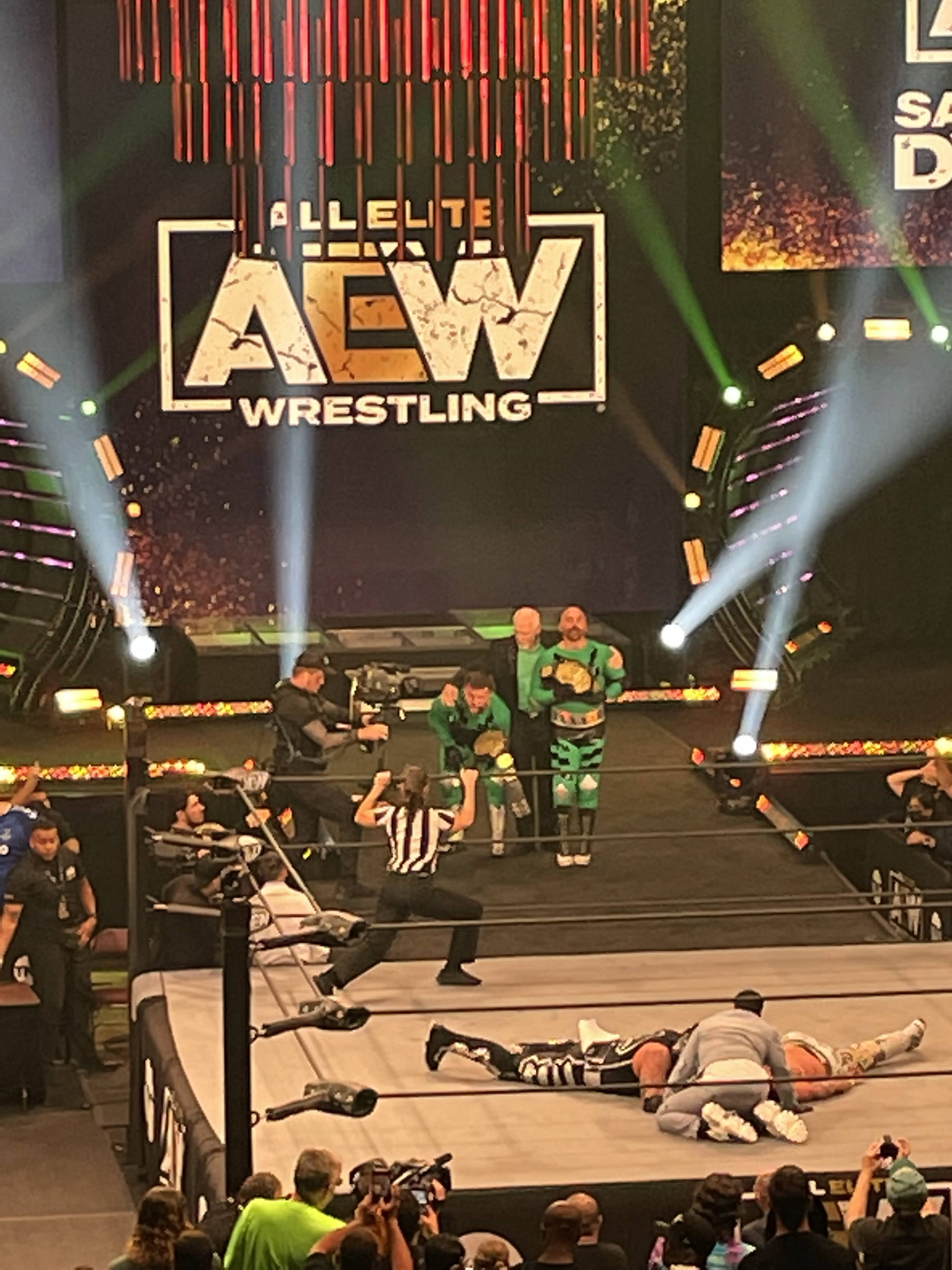
FTR winning the AAA World Tag Team Championship from The Lucha Bros in October 2021

On the October 16, 2021 episode of Dynamite, FTR, disguised as luchadors known as Las Super Ranas, defeated the Lucha Brothers to win the AAA World Tag Team Championship for the first time. Following the dissolution of The Pinnacle, FTR turned face and aligned with CM Punk in his feud with MJF.

At Final Battle on December 11, FTR confronted the newly crowned ROH World Tag Team Champions, the Briscoe Brothers, beginning a rivalry that culminated at Supercard of Honor XV on April 1, 2022. FTR defeated the Briscoes to win the ROH World Tag Team Championship, becoming double champions alongside their AAA titles. On June 26, at AEW x NJPW: Forbidden Door, they defeated United Empire (Great-O-Khan and Jeff Cobb) and Roppongi Vice (Rocky Romero and Trent Beretta) in a three-way tag team match to win the IWGP Tag Team Championship, becoming triple champions. At Death Before Dishonor on July 23, 2022, FTR defeated the Briscoes in a two-out-of-three-falls match to retain the ROH titles. They lost the ROH titles to the Briscoes in a dog collar match at Final Battle on December 10, ending their reign at 253 days.

FTR returned at Revolution on March 5, 2023, confronting The Gunns after they retained the AEW World Tag Team Championship. On the April 5 episode of Dynamite, FTR defeated The Gunns to win the AEW World Tag Team Championship for the second time, after agreeing to leave AEW if they lost the match. They successfully defended the titles against The Young Bucks at All In on August 27 and Aussie Open at WrestleDream on October 1. On the October 7 episode of Collision, they lost the titles to Big Bill and Ricky Starks, ending their second reign at 185 days.

In 2024, FTR feuded with the House of Black and Blackpool Combat Club, losing to Jon Moxley and Claudio Castagnoli at Revolution on March 3. They later reached the finals of a tournament for the vacant AEW World Tag Team Championship but lost to The Young Bucks in a ladder match at Dynasty on April 21. FTR also faced The Young Bucks at Double or Nothing and All In, losing both matches.

On December 28, 2024, at Worlds End, FTR joined Adam Copeland in confronting the Death Riders, with the trio becoming known as Rated FTR. At Dynasty on April 6, 2025, Rated FTR unsuccessfully challenged the Death Riders for the AEW World Trios Championship. FTR then turned heel by attacking Copeland. On the April 23 episode of Dynamite, Stokely became their manager.

At All Out on September 20, FTR lost to Copeland and Christian Cage. At Full Gear on November 22, they defeated Brodido to win the AEW World Tag Team Championship for a third time, tying the record for most reigns with the titles. They retained the titles against the Young Bucks at Revolution on March 15, 2026, and against Copeland and Cage at Dynasty on April 12. At Double or Nothing on May 24, FTR lost the titles to Copeland and Cage in an I Quit match, ending their third reign at 183 days.

==== Various feuds (2026–present) ====
FTR returned from a three-month hiatus at All In on August 30, confronting Copeland and Cage after their successful title defense against The Young Bucks. At All Out on September 26, FTR unsuccessfully challenged for the AEW World Tag Team Championship in a three-way ladder match won by The Young Bucks. In October, they began a best-of-five series against the Motor City Machine Guns (Alex Shelley and Chris Sabin), losing the first match at WrestleDream on October 17. The two teams would trade victories for the second, third, and fourth matches which would tie the series at 2-2. FTR lost the deciding match on the November 11 episode of Dynamite. Three days later at Full Gear, FTR aligned themselves with the debuting Kasper Brothers (Jacob Kasper and Drew Kasper) after both teams attacked the Motor City Machine Guns and Young Bucks.

=== Lucha Libre AAA Worldwide (2021–2022) ===
On the October 16, 2021 at All Elite Wrestling's episode of Dynamite, FTR, disguised as luchadors known as Las Super Ranas, defeated the Lucha Brothers to win the AAA World Tag Team Championship for the first time. They lost the titles to Dralístico and Dragon Lee at AAA Noche de Campeones on December 28, 2022, ending their reign at 441 days.

=== New Japan Pro-Wrestling (2022–2023) ===
After winning the IWGP Tag Team Championships at AEW x NJPW: Forbidden Door, FTR made their first appearance for New Japan Pro-Wrestling, at Music City Mayhem, where they teamed with Alex Zayne, in a losing effort to United Empire's, Aussie Open and T. J. Perkins. After the match, Aussie Open challenged FTR to a match for the IWGP Tag Team Championships. FTR made their first IWGP Tag Team Championship defense on night one of Royal Quest II, defeating Aussie Open in the main event. On January 4 2023 at Wrestle Kingdom 17, FTR lost the IWGP Tag Team Championships to Bishamon (Hirooki Goto and YOSHI-HASHI), ending their reign at 192 days.

== Professional wrestling style and persona ==
FTR have been praised for their old-school style and knowledge of tag team wrestling. According to Harwood, the tag team approach to wrestling is having boundaries and rules and work with them, usually breaking them. Pro wrestling booker and manager Jim Cornette, known for his old-school approach, has praised the team on several occasions. The team uses the phrase "No flips, just fists" to convey their more traditional, mat based in-ring style in contrast to the more high flying style of some contemporary teams. The duo said that they were modeled after The Brain Busters and the Condrey/Eaton version of The Midnight Express.

After the two left WWE, Dawson and Wilder changed their names to Dax Harwood and Cash Wheeler, now using their real last names while paying tribute to Demolition's Ax and Smash.

The duo's finishing move, called the "Shatter Machine" in WWE, was inspired by the "Codebreaker" used by Chris Jericho, whom the two saw as a major inspiration; although WWE staff had told them they did not need it, the two asked for Jericho's approval to use the move, which he gave them. The duo confirmed after leaving WWE that they would change the move's name. As FTR, the duo renamed the move to the "Goodnight Express", an homage to The Midnight Express. They later renamed the move again to "Big Rig" after the late Brodie Lee before returning to the “Shatter Machine” name in 2023 at Revolution. FTR also uses an assisted spike piledriver called the "Mind Breaker" as their double-team finishing move in AEW, modeled after the Brain Busters's own finisher.

In November 2020, Harwood and Wheeler revealed in an interview with Talk Sport journalist Alex McCarthy that FTR wanted to join AEW, despite being offered a huge amount of money to stay in the WWE, because they kept getting pulled from main roster events in the WWE. Harwood stated "We knew it was time for us to move on because money is great, and I am so fortunate and lucky to take care of my beautiful wife and perfect little six year old daughter because of professional wrestling, but that's what it's because of – professional wrestling." Wheeler stated "Once we got pulled from all of our dates on the main roster, it was down to NXT as the option and we talked to Hunter at length, there were offers on the table that were very tempting because we loved NXT and we loved our time there, but at the end of the day like Dax said, we knew that our time there was done."

== Other media ==
The Revival made their video game debut as playable characters in WWE 2K17, and have since appeared in WWE 2K18, WWE 2K19, WWE 2K20. and AEW Fight Forever.

== Championships and accomplishments ==
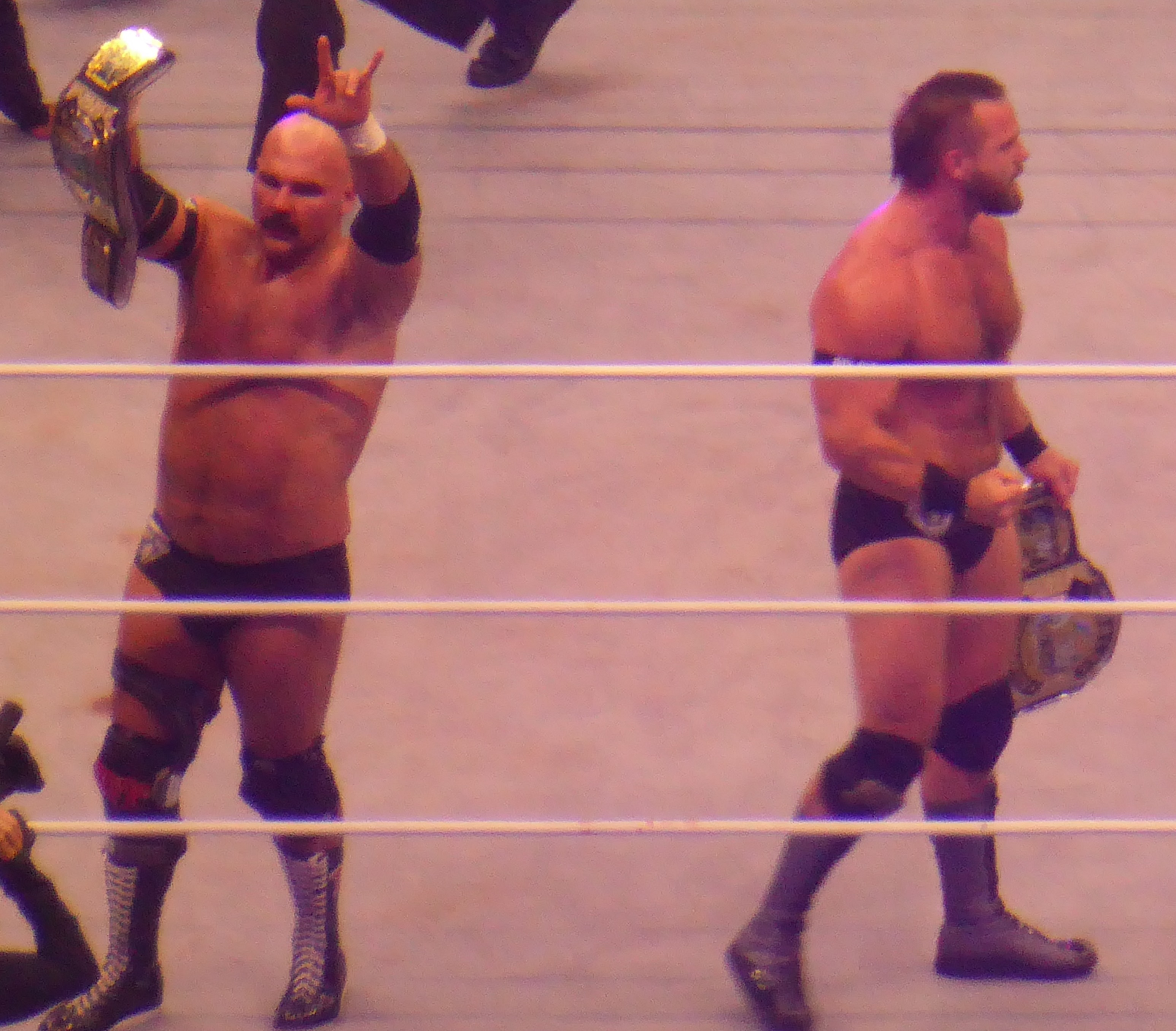
FTR are three-time AEW World Tag Team Champions

- All Elite Wrestling
  - AEW World Tag Team Championship (3 times)
- Lucha Libre AAA Worldwide
  - AAA World Tag Team Championship (1 time)
- New Japan Pro-Wrestling
  - IWGP Tag Team Championship (1 time)
- Revolution Pro Wrestling
  - Undisputed British Tag Team Championship (1 time, current)
- Ring of Honor
  - ROH World Tag Team Championship (1 time)
- WWE
  - NXT Tag Team Championship (2 times)
  - WWE 24/7 Championship (1 time) (Note: The Revival simultaneously pinned R-Truth to become co-WWE 24/7 Champions, making the team co-holders of the title.)
  - WWE Raw Tag Team Championship (2 times)
  - WWE SmackDown Tag Team Championship (1 time)
  - First WWE Tag Team Triple Crown Champions
  - NXT Year-End Award (2 times)
    - Tag Team of the Year (2016)
    - Match of the Year (2016) – vs. DIY (Johnny Gargano and Tommaso Ciampa) in a Best 2-of-3 Falls match for the NXT Tag Team Championship at NXT TakeOver: Toronto
- The Baltimore Sun
  - WWE Tag Team of the Year (2016)
- ESPN
  - Tag Team of the Year (2023, 2025)
- Pro Wrestling Illustrated
  - Tag Team of the Year (2022, 2023)
  - Ranked No. 1 of PWI Tag Team 50/100 in 2020 and 2023
- Sports Illustrated
  - Tag Team of the Year (2025)
- Wrestling Observer Newsletter
  - Tag Team of the Year (2022, 2023)
  - Feud of the Year (2022) vs. The Briscoes
