= RevPro 13th Anniversary Show =

2025 RevPro pay-per-view event

- Promotional poster of the event
- Promotion: Revolution Pro Wrestling
- Date: August 22–23, 2025
- City: London, England
- Venue: Crystal Palace National Sports Centre

Event chronology
← Previous; RevPro Live In Southampton 37	Next → RevPro Live In London 99

RevPro Anniversary Show chronology
← Previous; Twelve Year Anniversary	Next → —

The RevPro 13th Anniversary Show was a two-night professional wrestling event produced by Revolution Pro Wrestling. It took place on August 22 and 23, 2025, at Crystal Palace National Sports Centre in London, England, with the first night taking place under the Global Wars UK banner. The event featured wrestlers from various promotions including Consejo Mundial de Lucha Libre (CMLL), New Japan Pro Wrestling (NJPW) and All Elite Wrestling (AEW).

== Production ==
=== Storylines ===
The event featured professional wrestling matches that involve different wrestlers from pre-existing scripted feuds and storylines. Wrestlers portray heroes, villains, or less distinguishable characters in scripted events that build tension and culminate in a wrestling match or series of matches. Storylines are produced on RevPro's weekly tour-based shows.

== Night 1 ==
Global Wars UK 2025
No.	Results	Stipulations	Times
1	Leon Slater defeated Francesco Akira by pinfall	Singles match	8:17
2	Persephone defeated Alexxis Falcon by disqualification	Singles match	9:58
3	Young Guns (Luke Jacobs and Ethan Allen) (c) defeated Grizzled Young Veterans (James Drake and Zack Gibson) by pinfall	Tag team match for the Undisputed British Tag Team Championship	22:09
4	Chris Ridgeway defeated Blue Panther by pinfall	Singles match	9:22
5	Yuya Uemura defeated Connor Mills by pinfall	Singles match	13:48
6	Mercedes Moné (British) defeated Emersyn Jayne (Discovery) by pinfall	Winner Takes All match for the Undisputed British Women's Championship and Discovery Wrestling Women's Championship (Note: After various outlets mistakenly referred to the title as the "Scottish Women's Championship" following Moné's victory, Discovery Wrestling clarified that it's called the DW Women's Championship.)	19:24
7	Athena (with Billie Starkz) defeated Mercedes Blaze by pinfall	Singles match	3:28
8	Tomohiro Ishii defeated Jay Joshua by pinfall	Singles match	13:18
9	Hiroshi Tanahashi, Katsuyori Shibata, Michael Oku, "Speedball" Mike Bailey, and Zozaya defeated Robbie X, Cowboy Way (1 Called Manders and Thomas Shire), and The Don Callis Family (Kyle Fletcher and Hechicero) by pinfall	Ten-man tag team match	22:12
(c) / – the champion(s) heading into the match

== Night 2 ==
No.	Results	Stipulations	Times
1	Mercedes Moné, Kanji, and Dani Luna defeated Cut Throat Collective (Alex Windsor, Nina Samuels, and Safire Reed) by pinfall	Six-woman tag team match	14:06
2	Nino Bryant (c) defeated Robbie X by pinfall	Singles match for the Undisputed British Cruiserweight Championship	12:33
3	Connor Mills and Jay Joshua defeated Cowboy Way (1 Called Manders and Thomas Shire) by pinfall	Great British Tag League tournament final	20:03
4	Persephone defeated Emersyn Jayne by pinfall	Singles match	11:13
5	Blue Panther and CPF (Danny Black, Joe Lando, and Maverick Mayhem) defeated Hechicero, Will Kaven, Mark Trew, and Kieron Lacey by pinfall	Eight-man tag team match	10:40
6	Yuya Uemura defeated JJ Gale by pinfall	Singles match	14:02
7	CRU (Lio Rush and Action Andretti) defeated Sunshine Machine (Chuck Mambo and TK Cooper) by countout	Tag team match	13:19
8	Zack Sabre Jr. defeated Zozaya by submission	Singles match	28:03
9	Leon Slater defeated Michael Oku by pinfall	Singles match	31:13
10	Sha Samuels defeated Ricky Knight Jr. (c) by pinfall	Title vs. Career match for the Undisputed British Heavyweight Championship	24:08
(c) / – the champion(s) heading into the match

== See also ==
- 2025 in professional wrestling
