= RevPro 11th Anniversary Show =

2023 RevPro pay-per-view event

- Promotional poster of the event
- Promotion: Revolution Pro Wrestling
- Date: August 26, 2023
- City: London, England
- Venue: Copper Box Arena
- Attendance: 4,072

Event chronology
← Previous; Epic Encounter	Next → Fantastica Mania UK

RevPro Anniversary Show chronology
← Previous; Ten Year Anniversary	Next → Twelve Year Anniversary

The RevPro 11th Anniversary Show was a professional wrestling event produced by Revolution Pro Wrestling. It took place on August 26, 2023, at the Copper Box Arena in London, England. The event featured wrestlers from various promotions including All Elite Wrestling, Impact Wrestling, New Japan Pro Wrestling and Progress Wrestling. It also featured the RevPro debut of Mickie James.

== Production ==
=== Background ===
On May 11, 2023, RevPro announced that they will hold their 11th anniversary show at the Copper Box Arena in London, England on Saturday August 26, 2023, one day before AEW All In.

=== Storylines ===
The event featured eleven professional wrestling matches that involve different wrestlers from pre-existing scripted feuds and storylines. Wrestlers portray heroes, villains, or less distinguishable characters in scripted events that build tension and culminate in a wrestling match or series of matches. Storylines are produced on RevPro's weekly tour-based shows.

== Event ==
=== Pre-show ===
The show started with a 10-woman battle royal to determine the #1 contender to the Undisputed British Women's Championship. Dani Luna won by last eliminating Safire Reed.

=== Preliminary matches ===
The main card started with the confrontation between Leon Slater and one half of the IWGP Junior Heavyweight Tag Team Champions Dan Moloney, solded with the victory of Slater obtained after a long-term feud between the two.

Next up, Connor Mills successfully defended the Undisputed British Cruiserweight Championship for the second time consecutively in that respective reign in a Six-way Scramble match which also involved Robbie X, Wild Boar, Jordan Breaks, Callum Newman and Sha Samuels.

In the third match, JJ Gale picked up a victory over NJPW young lion Kosei Fujita.

Next, El Phantasmo and Katsuyori Shibata defeated David Finlay and Gabe Kidd in tag team competition.

The sixth bout saw the NJPW World Television Champion Zack Sabre Jr. defeating the time's Progress Atlas Champion Ricky Knight Jr. in singles competition.

Next up, Mark Andrews and Flash Morgan Webster marked their second consecutive defense of the Undisputed British Tag Team Championship in that respective reign against Jude London and Paris De Silva.

The eighth bout saw Tomohiro Ishii defeating Luke Jacobs in singles competition.

In the ninth match, Alex Windsor defeated Mickie James and Hyan to successfully retain the Undisputed British Women's Championship.

In the semi main event, Michael Oku defeated Trent Seven to mark his first defense of the Undisputed British Heavyweight Championship in that respective reign.

=== Main event match ===
In the main event, United Empire leader Will Ospreay picked up a victory over Los Ingobernables de Japon's Shingo Takagi. After the bout ended, a masked Chris Jericho made his surprise RPW debut attacked Ospreay prior to their match from All In which was set to occur the very next day.

== Results ==
No.	Results	Stipulations	Times
1^{P}	Dani Luna won by last eliminating Safire Reed (Note: The other participants were Alexxis Falcon, Maya Matthews, Rhio, Skye Smitson, Mercedez Blaze, Chantal Jordan, Rayne Leverkusen and Skye Blue.)	10-woman Battle Royal to determine the #1 contender to the Undisputed British Women's Championship	10:41
2^{P}	Leon Slater defeated Dan Moloney by pinfall	Singles match	10:19
3	Connor Mills (c) defeated Robbie X, Wild Boar, Jordon Breaks, Callum Newman and Sha Samuels by pinfall	Six-way Scramble match for the Undisputed British Cruiserweight Championship	11:45
4	JJ Gale defeated Kosei Fujita by submission	Singles match	9:05
5	Katsuyori Shibata and El Phantasmo defeated Bullet Club War Dogs (David Finlay and Gabe Kidd) (with Gedo) by pinfall	Tag team match	12:30
6	Zack Sabre Jr. defeated Ricky Knight Jr. by submission	Singles match	17:33
7	Subculture (Flash Morgan Webster and Mark Andrews) (c) defeated The VeloCities (Jude London and Paris De Silva) by pinfall	Tag team match for the Undisputed British Tag Team Championship	11:15
8	Tomohiro Ishii defeated Luke Jacobs by pinfall	Singles match	17:59
9	Alex Windsor (c) defeated Hyan and Mickie James by pinfall	Triple threat match for the Undisputed British Women's Championship	15:37
10	Michael Oku (c) (with Amira Blair) defeated Trent Seven (with Levi Muir) by submission	Singles match for the Undisputed British Heavyweight Championship	18:43
11	Will Ospreay defeated Shingo Takagi by pinfall	Singles match	20:09
(c) / – the champion(s) heading into the match; P / – the match was broadcast on the pre-show

== See also ==
- 2023 in professional wrestling
