= Emersyn Jayne =

Scottish wrestler (born 1993)

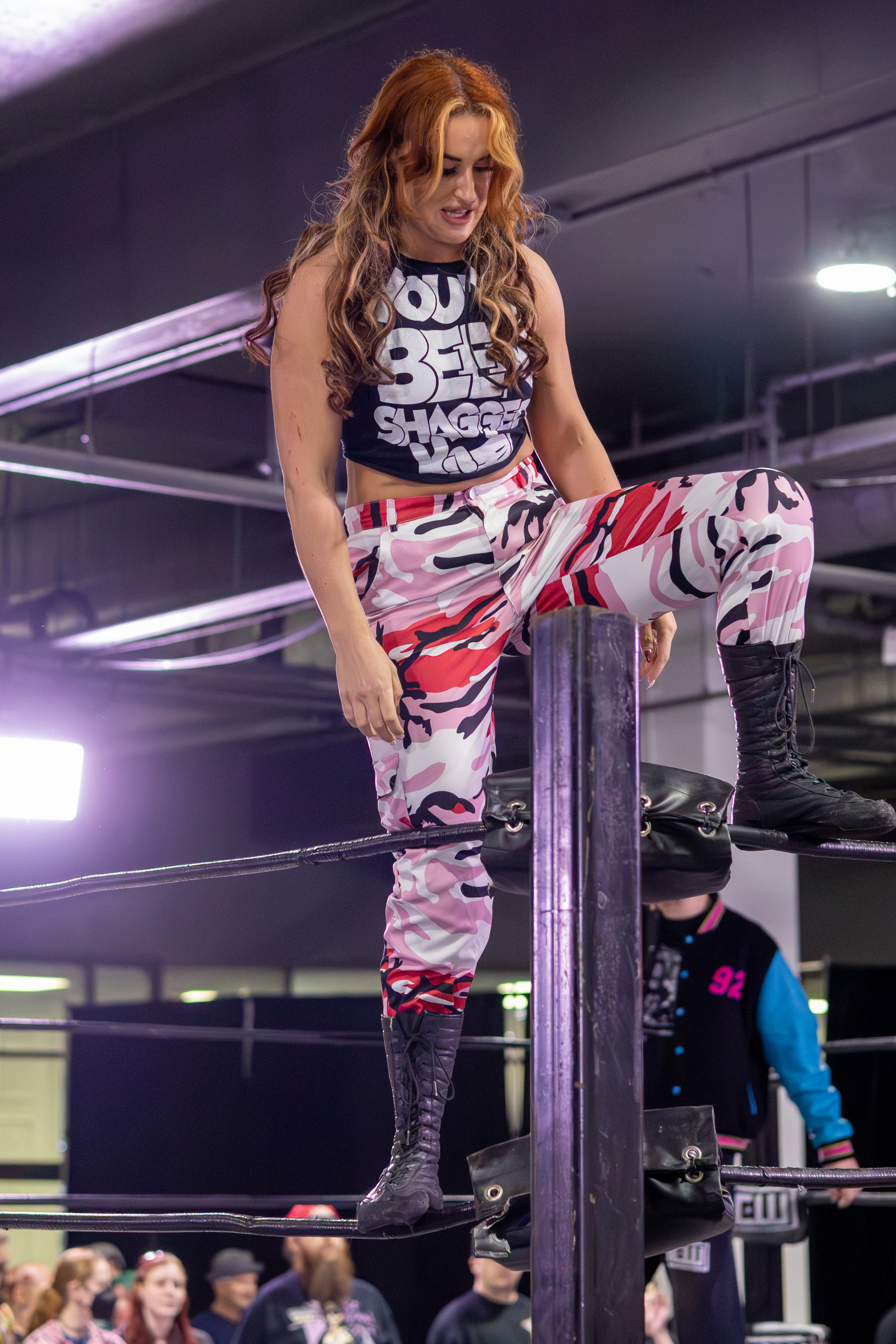
- Jayne in October 2025

Personal information
- Born: 31 January 1993 (age 33) Perth, Scotland

Professional wrestling career
- Ring name: Sammii Jayne Emersyn Jayne
- Billed height: 157 cm (5 ft 2 in)
- Billed weight: 60 kg (132 lb)
- Trained by: Joe Hendry; Damian O'Connor; Mikey Whiplash; Wild Boar; Flash Morgan Webster
- Debut: 2012

Samantha Hunter better known by her ring name Emersyn Jayne is a Scottish professional wrestler best known for her tenure with Pro-Wrestling: EVE where she was the first grand slam champion of the promotion. She is also known for competing in various promotions of the British independent scene.

== Professional wrestling career ==
=== British and Scottish independent circuit (2012–present) ===
Hunter made her professional wrestling debut at SWE Hellbound, an event promoted by Scottish Wrestling Entertainment (SWE) on July 14, 2012, where she fell short to Nikki Storm in singles competition. Hunter is known for her tenures with various promotions from the British and Scottish independent scenes such as Over the Top Wrestling (OTT), Insane Championship Wrestling (ICW), X Wrestling Alliance (XWA), TNT Extreme Wrestling (TNT) and many others.

=== European and American independent circuit (2012–present) ===
Hunter competed in Westside Xtreme Wrestling's wXw Femmes Fatales tournament, competition in which she made her first appearance at the 2019 edition, where she fell short to Leyla Hirsch in the first rounds. She returned to the competition at the 2025 edition in which she fell short to Anita Vaughan in the quarterfinals.

At DPW Super Battle 2025, an event promoted by Deadlock Pro-Wrestling on October 19, she teamed up with Dani Luna to defeat Hyan and Lena Kross. At GCW Shotzi Blackheart's House Of Horrors, an event promoted by Game Changer Wrestling on October 24, 2025, Hunter fell short to Shotzi Blackheart.

=== Pro-Wrestling: EVE (2016–present) ===
Hunter made her debut in Pro-Wrestling: EVE under the ring name of "Sammii Jayne" at EVE In London Episode 2 - After The Storm on May 28, 2016, where she fell short to Pollyanna in the first rounds of the 2016 Queen Of The Ring tournament.

During her time with the promotion, she became the first-ever wrestler to hold all the available championships. She is a former two-time Pro-Wrestling: EVE Champion, title which she first won at Babes with Power on May 21, 2017, by defeating Kay Lee Ray. She won the title on the second occasion at Aim to Misbehave on December 4, 2021, by defeating Jetta. As for the Pro-Wrestling: EVE International Championship, Hunter won the title for the first time at Reign After Queendom on February 1, 2020, by defeating Jamie Hayter. She is also a former two-time Pro-Wrestling: EVE Tag Team Champion, title which she first won alongside Gisele Shaw at Let's Get Shitfaced and Scream into the Void on December 14, 2019, by defeating The Woke Queens (Debbie Keitel and Valkyrie). She won the titles on the second occasion at EVE 136: Mean Grrrls on July 4, 2025, alongside Rhio as "Big Beefy Bitches" by defeating Hard Up North (Harley Hudson and Lucy Sky).

=== Revolution Pro Wrestling (2018–present) ===
Hunter made her debut in Revolution Pro Wrestling at RevPro Live At The Cockpit 24 on January 6, 2018, where she fell short to Deonna Purrazzo in the first rounds of the inaugural tournament for the Undisputed British Women's Championship. Hunter won the 2019 edition of the Queen of the Ring tournament in which she defeated Kellyanne in the first rounds, Yuu in the second, and Debbie Keitel in the finals.

She competed in various signature events of the promotion. In the RevPro Anniversary branch of events, she made her first appearance on the first night of the RevPro 13th Anniversary Show which aired under the Global Wars UK banner on August 22, 2025, where she unsuccessfully challenged Mercedes Moné in a winner takes all for Moné's Undisputed British Women's Championship and Hunter's Discovery Wrestling Women's Championship. She also competed in the second night of the event from August 23, where she fell short to Persephone in singles competition. At the 2025 edition of High Stakes from April 20, Hunter competed in a Women's Revolution Gauntlet match won by Dani Luna and also involving Amira Blair, Anita Vaughan, Charli Evans, LA Taylor, Lizzy Evo, Mercedez Blaze, Safire Reed, Serena Deeb and Skye Smitson.

=== Progress Wrestling (2024–present) ===
Hunter made her debut in Progress Wrestling at Chapter 163: Twisted Metal on February 25, 2024, where she unsuccessfully challenged Rhio for the Progress World Women's Championship. At Chapter 165: Diamond Dust on March 7, 2024, she fell short to Nina Samuels in singles competition. Hunter unsuccessfully challenged for the Progress Women's title several more times at "Chapter" events; at Chapter 171: History Is Written By The Victors on September 22, 2024, against Rhio, and at Chapter 176: For The Love of Progress 3 on February 14, 2025, against Nina Samuels.

== Championships and accomplishments ==
- 3 Count Wrestling
  - 3CW Women's Championship (1 time)
- Bodyslam Pro Wrestling
  - Bodyslam Women's Championship (1 time)
- Discovery Wrestling
  - DW Women's Championship (2 times)
- Fierce Females
  - Fierce Females Championship (1 time)
- Israeli Pro Wrestling Association
  - IPWA International Women's Championship (1 time, current)
- Main Event Wrestling
  - MEW Women's Championship (1 time)
- North Wrestling
  - North Tag Team Championship (1 time) – with Rhio
- North Coast Wrestling
  - NCW Tag Team Championship (1 time, current) – with Tomás Blanco
- Over the Top Wrestling
  - OTT Women's Championship (2 times)
- Pro-Wrestling: EVE
  - Pro-Wrestling: EVE Championship (2 times)
  - Pro-Wrestling: EVE International Championship (1 time)
  - Pro-Wrestling: EVE Tag Team Championship (2 times) – with Gisele Shaw (1) and Rhio (1)
  - First Grand Slam Champion
- Pro Wrestling Illustrated
  - Ranked No. 419 of the top 500 singles wrestlers in the PWI 500 in 2025
  - Ranked No. 35 of the top 150 female singles wrestlers in the PWI Women's 100 in 2022
- RAD:PRO Wrestling
  - RAD:PRO Mix Tag Championship (1 time) – with Switch
- Revolution Championship Wrestling
  - RCW Women's Championship (1 time)
- Revolution Pro Wrestling
  - Queen of the Ring (2019)
- Scottish Wrestling Entertainment
  - SWE Future Division Championship (1 time)
- Titanic Wrestling
  - Titanic Women's Championship (1 time)
- TNT Extreme Wrestling
  - TNT Extreme Division Championship (1 time)
  - TNT Women's Tag Team Championship (1 time) – with Rhio
  - DOA Tournament (2024)
- Wrestle Carnival
  - Wrestle Carnival Pure Championship (1 time)
