= Global Wars UK =

British professional wrestling event

- Promotions: New Japan Pro-Wrestling; Revolution Pro Wrestling; Ring of Honor (2025–); Consejo Mundial de Lucha Libre (2025–)
- First event: 2015

Global Wars UK is an annual professional wrestling supershow co-produced by the Japanese New Japan Pro-Wrestling (NJPW) and British Revolution Pro Wrestling (RPW) promotions. A spin-off of Ring of Honor and New Japan Pro-Wrestling's Global Wars concept, the shows consist of talent for both promotions wrestling against each other. The two promotions established a partnership in July 2015 as part of NJPW's "New IWGP Conception." All editions of the show have been archived on New Japan's NJPW World streaming service.

== Events ==
#	Event	Date	City	Venue	Main event	Ref(s)
1	Global Wars UK (2015)	October 3, 2015	Reading, Berkshire	Rivermead Leisure Complex	AJ Styles (c) vs. Jyushin Thunder Liger for the British Heavyweight Championship	
2	Global Wars UK (2016)	November 10, 2016	Bethnal Green, London	York Hall	Zack Sabre Jr. (c) vs. Katsuyori Shibata for the British Heavyweight Championship	
3	Global Wars UK (2016)	November 11, 2016	Walthamstow, London	Waltham Forest Town Hall	Katsuyori Shibata (c) vs. Chris Hero for the British Heavyweight Championship	
4	Global Wars UK (2017)	November 9, 2017	Bethnal Green, London	York Hall	Chaos (Hirooki Goto and Will Ospreay) vs. Suzuki-gun (Minoru Suzuki and Zack Sabre Jr.)	
5	Global Wars UK (2017)	November 10, 2017	Walthamstow, London	Waltham Forest Town Hall	Zack Sabre Jr. (c) vs. Will Ospreay for the British Heavyweight Championship	
6	Global Wars UK (2018)	October 14, 2018	Bethnal Green, London	Brixton Recreation Centre	Minoru Suzuki (c) vs. Tomohiro Ishii for the British Heavyweight Championship	
7	Global Wars UK (2024)	October 19, 2024	Doncaster, Yorkshire	Doncaster Dome	Luke Jacobs (c) vs. Tomohiro Ishii for the British Heavyweight Championship	
8	Global Wars UK (2025)	August 22, 2025	Crystal Palace, London	Crystal Palace National Sports Centre	Hiroshi Tanahashi, Katsuyori Shibata, Michael Oku, "Speedball" Mike Bailey, and Zozaya vs. Cowboy Way (1 Called Manders and Thomas Shire), Don Callis Family (Kyle Fletcher and Hechicero), and Robbie X	
9	ROH Global Wars United Kingdom	December 18, 2025 (taped December 13, 2025 and December 17, 2025)	Cardiff, Wales Manchester, Greater Manchester	Utilita Arena Cardiff Co-op Live	Wheeler Yuta vs. Nigel McGuinness	
(c) – refers to the champion(s) heading into the match

== 2015 ==
Global Wars UK
- Promotion(s): New Japan Pro-Wrestling; Revolution Pro Wrestling
- Date: October 3, 2015
- City: Reading, Berkshire
- Venue: Rivermead Leisure Complex

Global Wars UK chronology
← Previous; First	Next → 2016

New Japan Pro-Wrestling events chronology
← Previous; Destruction in Kobe	Next → King of Pro-Wrestling

No.	Results	Stipulations	Times
1	Tetsuya Naito defeated Kushida and Martin Kirby	Three-way match	12:18
2	Gideon Grey defeated Gedo	Singles match	8:40
3	Tencozy (Hiroyoshi Tenzan and Satoshi Kojima) defeated The Thrillers (Joel Redman and Mark Haskins)	Tag team match	12:04
4	Shinsuke Nakamura defeated Marty Scurll	Singles match	17:20
5	Bullet Club (Doc Gallows and Karl Anderson) defeated The Revolutionists (James Castle and Sha Samuels)	Tag team match	7:09
6	Kazuchika Okada defeated Will Ospreay	Singles match	15:49
7	Hiroshi Tanahashi defeated Big Damo	Singles match	14:25
8	AJ Styles (c) defeated Jyushin Thunder Liger	Singles match for the British Heavyweight Championship	15:04
(c) / – the champion(s) heading into the match

== 2016 ==
=== Night 1 ===
Global Wars UK
- Promotion(s): New Japan Pro-Wrestling; Revolution Pro Wrestling
- Date: November 10, 2016
- City: Bethnal Green, London
- Venue: York Hall

Global Wars UK chronology
← Previous; 2015	Next → 2017

New Japan Pro-Wrestling events chronology
← Previous; Power Struggle	Next → Global Wars UK 2016 Night 2

No.	Results	Stipulations	Times
1	Marty Scurll defeated Jyushin Thunder Liger	Singles match	13:35
2	Tomoaki Honma defeated Sha Samuels	Singles match	6:57
3	Yuji Nagata defeated Pete Dunne	Singles match	11:55
4	Chris Hero defeated Tomohiro Ishii	Singles match	13:35
5	Will Ospreay defeated Bushi	Singles match	11:11
6	Los Ingobernables de Japón (Evil, Sanada, and Tetsuya Naito) defeated David Starr and Moustache Mountain (Trent Seven and Tyler Bate)	Six-man tag team match	14:50
7	Katsuyori Shibata defeated Zack Sabre Jr. (c)	Singles match for the British Heavyweight Championship	16:39
(c) / – the champion(s) heading into the match

=== Night 2 ===
Global Wars UK
- Promotion(s): New Japan Pro-Wrestling; Revolution Pro Wrestling
- Date: November 11, 2016
- City: Walthamstow, London
- Venue: Waltham Forest Town Hall
- Attendance: 1,120

Global Wars UK chronology
← Previous; 2015	Next → 2017

New Japan Pro-Wrestling events chronology
← Previous; Global Wars UK 2016 Night 1	Next → Wrestle Kingdom 11

No.	Results	Stipulations	Times
1	Charlie Garrett and Joel Redman defeated Los Ingobernables de Japón (Bushi and Evil)	Tag team match	9:44
2	Josh Bodom defeated Tomoaki Honma	Singles match	10:35
3	Yuji Nagata defeated Trent Seven	Singles match	10:50
4	Will Ospreay defeated Jyushin Thunder Liger	Singles match	9:49
5	Tomohiro Ishii defeated Pete Dunne	Singles match	12:25
6	Los Ingobernables de Japón (Sanada and Tetsuya Naito) defeated LDRS of the New School (Marty Scurll and Zack Sabre Jr.)	Tag team match	18:44
7	Katsuyori Shibata (c) defeated Chris Hero	Singles match for the British Heavyweight Championship	13:18
(c) / – the champion(s) heading into the match

== 2017 ==
=== Night 1 ===
Global Wars UK
- Promotion(s): New Japan Pro-Wrestling; Revolution Pro Wrestling
- Date: November 9, 2017
- City: Bethnal Green, London
- Venue: York Hall

Global Wars UK chronology
← Previous; 2016	Next → 2018

New Japan Pro-Wrestling events chronology
← Previous; Power Struggle	Next → Global Wars UK 2017 Night 2

No.	Results	Stipulations
1	Ryan Smile defeated Bushi and Josh Bodom (c)	Three-way match for the British Cruiserweight Championship
2	Chaos (Gedo and Toru Yano) defeated Gideon Grey and No Fun Dunne	Tag team match
3	Matt Riddle defeated El Desperado	Singles match
4	Tetsuya Naito defeated Marty Scurll	Singles match
5	Yuji Nagata defeated Zack Gibson	Singles match
6	CCK (Chris Brookes and Travis Banks) defeated Chaos (Rocky Romero and Yoshi-Hashi)	Tag team match
7	Tomohiro Ishii defeated Keith Lee	Singles match
8	Chaos (Hirooki Goto and Will Ospreay) defeated Suzuki-gun (Minoru Suzuki and Zack Sabre Jr.)	Tag team match
(c) / – the champion(s) heading into the match

=== Night 2 ===
Global Wars UK
- Promotion(s): New Japan Pro-Wrestling; Revolution Pro Wrestling
- Date: November 10, 2017
- City: Walthamstow, London
- Venue: Waltham Forest Town Hall

Global Wars UK chronology
← Previous; 2016	Next → 2018

New Japan Pro-Wrestling events chronology
← Previous; Global Wars UK 2017 Night 1	Next → Lion's Gate Project 9

No.	Results	Stipulations
1	CCK (Chris Brookes, Kid Lykos, and Travis Banks) defeated Chaos (Gedo, Hirooki Goto and Yoshi-Hashi)	Six-man tag team match
2	Toru Yano defeated Zack Gibson	Singles match
3	Josh Bodom defeated Rocky Romero	Singles match
4	Tomohiro Ishii defeated Dave Mastiff	Singles match
5	Ryan Smile (c) defeated El Desperado	Singles match for British Cruiserweight Championship
6	Los Ingobernables de Japón (Bushi and Tetsuya Naito) defeated Keith Lee and Yuji Nagata	Tag team match
7	Minoru Suzuki defeated Matt Riddle	Singles match
8	Zack Sabre Jr. (c) defeated Will Ospreay	Singles match for the British Heavyweight Championship
(c) / – the champion(s) heading into the match

== 2018 ==
Global Wars UK
- Promotion(s): Revolution Pro Wrestling; New Japan Pro-Wrestling
- Date: October 14, 2018
- City: London, England
- Venue: Brixton Recreation Centre

Event chronology
← Previous; RevPro: Live at The Cockpit 33; NJPW: King of Pro-Wrestling 2018	Next → RevPro: Uprising; NJPW: Power Struggle

Global Wars UK chronology
← Previous; 2017	Next → 2024

No.	Results	Stipulations	Times
1	Kushida defeated Kurtis Chapman	Singles match	13:03
2	Los Ingobernables de Japón (Evil and Sanada) defeated Ringkampf (Timothy Thatcher and Walter)	Tag team match	12:40
3	Great O-Kharn (with Lord Gideon Grey) defeated Rishi Ghosh	Singles match	10:21
4	Tetsuya Naito defeated Chris Brookes	Singles match	11:52
5	Zack Sabre Jr. defeated Hirooki Goto	Singles match	14:52
6	Satoshi Kojima defeated Mark Davis	Singles match	9:33
7	El Phantasmo defeated Rocky Romero	Singles match	10:33
8	Chris Ridgeway defeated Will Ospreay	Singles match	14:35
9	Tomohiro Ishii defeated Minoru Suzuki (c)	Singles match for the British Heavyweight Championship	24:06
(c) / – the champion(s) heading into the match

== 2024 ==
Global Wars UK
- Promotion(s): Revolution Pro Wrestling; New Japan Pro-Wrestling
- Date: October 19, 2024
- City: Doncaster, Yorkshire
- Venue: Doncaster Dome

Event chronology
← Previous; RevPro: British J-Cup; NJPW: King of Pro-Wrestling	Next → RevPro: Uprising; NJPW: Royal Quest IV

Global Wars UK chronology
← Previous; 2018	Next → 2025

No.	Results	Stipulations
1	Will Kaven (c) defeated Cameron Khai	Singles match for the Undisputed British Cruiserweight Championship
2	Los Ingobernables de Japon (Bushi and Hiromu Takahashi) defeated Callum Newman and JJ Gale	Tag team match
3	AZM defeated Kanji	Singles match
4	Hiroshi Tanahashi, Leon Slater, and Zozaya defeated Connor Mills, Gabe Kidd, and Jay Joshua	Six-man tag team match
5	Yota Tsuji defeated Máscara Dorada 2.0	Singles match
6	Zack Sabre Jr. defeated Robbie X	Singles match
7	Mina Shirakawa (c) defeated Lizzy Evo	Singles match for the Undisputed British Women's Championship
8	Michael Oku defeated Ricky Knight Jr.	Singles match to determine the #1 contender to the Undisputed British Heavyweight Championship
9	Luke Jacobs (c) defeated Tomohiro Ishii	Singles match for the Undisputed British Heavyweight Championship
(c) / – the champion(s) heading into the match

== 2025 ==
Global Wars UK
- Promotion(s): Revolution Pro Wrestling; New Japan Pro-Wrestling; Ring of Honor; Consejo Mundial de Lucha Libre
- Date: August 22, 2025
- City: London, England
- Venue: Crystal Palace National Sports Centre
- Tagline: 13 Year Anniversary Show Night 1

Event chronology
← Previous; RevPro: Summer Sizzler; NJPW: G1 Climax 35; ROH: Supercard of Honor; CMLL: 72 Aniversario de Arena Puebla	Next → RevPro: Trios Grand Prix; NJPW: Forbidden Door; ROH: Death Before Dishonor; CMLL: 92nd Anniversary Show

Global Wars UK chronology
← Previous; 2024	Next → —

No.	Results	Stipulations	Times
1	Leon Slater defeated Francesco Akira by pinfall	Singles match	8:17
2	Persephone defeated Alexxis Falcon by disqualification	Singles match	9:58
3	Young Guns (Luke Jacobs and Ethan Allen) (c) defeated Grizzled Young Veterans (James Drake and Zack Gibson) by pinfall	Tag team match for the Undisputed British Tag Team Championship	22:09
4	Chris Ridgeway defeated Blue Panther	Singles match	9:22
5	Yuya Uemura defeated Connor Mills by pinfall	Singles match	13:48
6	Mercedes Moné (British) defeated Emersyn Jayne (Scottish) by pinfall	Winner Takes All match for the Undisputed British Women's Championship and Discovery Wrestling Scottish Women's Championship	19:24
7	Athena defeated Mercedes Blaze by pinfall	Singles match	3:28
8	Tomohiro Ishii defeated Jay Joshua by pinfall	Singles match	13:18
9	Hiroshi Tanahashi, Katsuyori Shibata, Michael Oku, "Speedball" Mike Bailey, and Zozaya defeated Cowboy Way (1 Called Manders and Thomas Shire), Don Callis Family (Kyle Fletcher and Hechicero), and Robbie X by pinfall	Ten-man tag team match	22:12
(c) / – the champion(s) heading into the match

== See also ==
- Professional wrestling in the United Kingdom
- List of professional wrestling promotions in Europe
- Global Wars
- Fantastica Mania
- War of the Worlds
