= RevPro 12th Anniversary Show =

2024 RevPro pay-per-view event

- Promotional poster of the event
- Promotion: Revolution Pro Wrestling
- Date: August 24, 2024
- City: London, England
- Venue: Copper Box Arena
- Attendance: cca. 3,300

Event chronology
← Previous; Summer Sizzler: Road To The Anniversary	Next → GWF/RevPro: Double Impact

RevPro Anniversary Show chronology
← Previous; Eleven Year Anniversary	Next → Thirteen Year Anniversary

The RevPro 12th Anniversary Show was a professional wrestling event produced by Revolution Pro Wrestling. It took place on August 24, 2024, at the Copper Box Arena in London, England. The event featured wrestlers from various promotions including Consejo Mundial de Lucha Libre (CMLL), New Japan Pro Wrestling (NJPW), All Elite Wrestling (AEW), Total Nonstop Action Wrestling (TNA) and Progress Wrestling.

== Production ==
=== Storylines ===
The event featured professional wrestling matches that involve different wrestlers from pre-existing scripted feuds and storylines. Wrestlers portray heroes, villains, or less distinguishable characters in scripted events that build tension and culminate in a wrestling match or series of matches. Storylines are produced on RevPro's weekly tour-based shows.

== Results ==
No.	Results	Stipulations	Times
1^{P}	Joshua James, Sha Samuels and Young Blood (Oskar Leube and Yuto Nakashima) defeated Goldenboy Santos, David Francisco, Greedy Souls (Brendan White and Danny Jones)	Eight-man tag team match	9:09
2	Ricky Knight Jr. defeated Zozaya by pinfall	Singles match	13:28
3	Ethan Allen defeated Connor Mills	Singles match	8:31
4	Will Kaven defeated Neón (c), Cameron Khai, El Phantasmo, Leon Slater and Dante Martin	Six-way match for the Undisputed British Cruiserweight Championship	12:07
5	Tomohiro Ishii defeated JJ Gale	Singles match	17:47
6	The Cut Throat Collective (Alex Windsor, Lizzy Evo, Mercedez Blaze, Safire Reed and Nina Samuels) defeated Nightshade, Rhio, Debbie Keitel, Kanji and Gisele Shaw	Ten-woman tag team match	22:56
7	Gabe Kidd defeated Donovan Dijak	Singles match	10:17
8	Sunshine Machine (Chuck Mambo and TK Cooper) defeated Grizzled Young Veterans (James Drake and Zack Gibson) (c)	Tag team match for the Undisputed British Tag Team Championship	12:15
9	Mina Shirakawa defeated Dani Luna (c)	Singles match for the Undisputed British Women's Championship	12:18
10	Zack Sabre Jr. defeated Hechicero	Singles match	22:51
11	Luke Jacobs defeated Michael Oku (c)	Singles match for the Undisputed British Heavyweight Championship	33:54
(c) / – the champion(s) heading into the match; P / – the match was broadcast on the pre-show

== See also ==
- 2024 in professional wrestling
