= Alexxis Falcon =

English professional wrestler (born 1993)

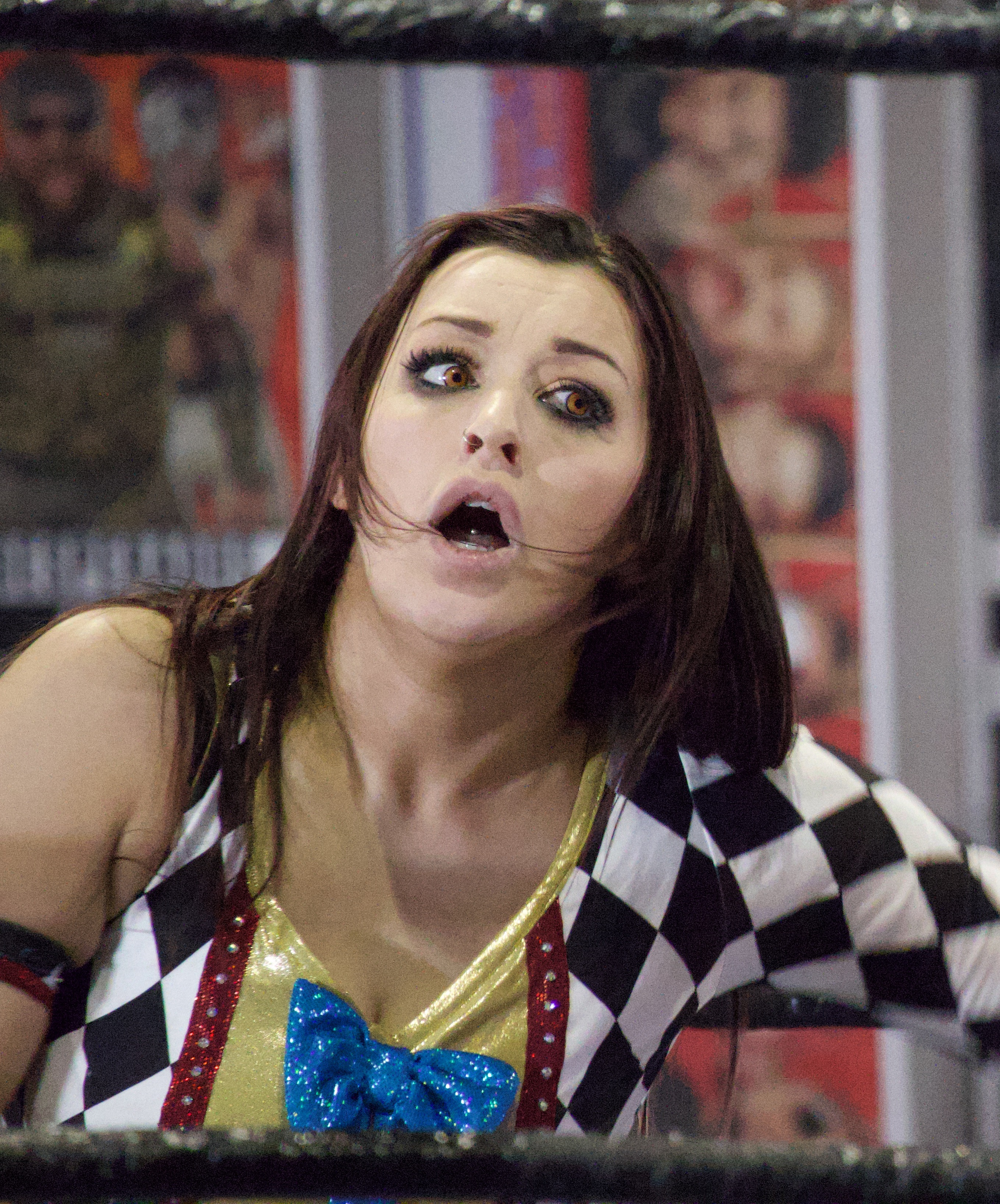
- Falcon in April 2024

Personal information
- Born: 18 July 1997 (age 29) Hull, England

Professional wrestling career
- Ring name: Alexxis Falcon
- Billed height: 160 cm (5 ft 3 in)
- Billed from: "The greatest thing out of Hull since Dean Windass"
- Trained by: Sam Bailey; Nathan Cruz
- Debut: 2017

Alexandra Cooper, better known by her ring name Alexxis Falcon, is an English professional wrestler. She currently performs on the British independent circuit.

== Professional wrestling career ==
=== European & British independent scene (2017–present) ===
Cooper made her professional wrestling debut at AOW Vendetta 2017, an event promoted by Alpha Omega Wrestling on August 5, 2017, where she unsuccessfully challenged Felony for the AOW Women's Championship. She is known for her tenures with various promotions from the British independent scene such as TNT Extreme Wrestling (TNT), FutureShock Wrestling (FSW) and others.

At EVE Thats No Moonsault on April 7, 2023, Falcon teamed up with her "M62 Wrecking Crew" partner Lizzy Evo in a losing effort against Royal Aces (Charlie Morgan and Jetta) in a number one contendership match for the Pro-Wrestling: EVE Tag Team Championship. At Wrestle Queendom VIII on March 8, 2026, she won a No. 1 contender match for the EVE Championship.

=== Progress Wrestling (2021–present) ===
Falcon made her first Progress appearance at Chapter 105: Bring The Thunder from February 27, 2021, where she competed in a Thunderbastard number one contendership match for the Progress World Women's Championship won by Kanji and also involving Gisele Shaw, Lana Austin, Mercedez Blaze, Millie McKenzie and Taonga. She directly challenged for the title at Chapter 117: Making Diamonds on August 14, 2021, where she competed in a three-way match disputed for the vacant belt won by Gisele Shaw and also involving Mercedes Blaze.

During her time with the promotion, Falcon was one half of the intergender tag team of "Cheeky Little Buggers" alongside Charles Crowley between 2024 and 2025. At Chapter 163: Twisted Metal on February 25, 2024, they defeated Smokin' Aces (Charlie Sterling and Nick Riley) to win the Progress Tag Team Championship. With this, Falcon became the first female wrestler to ever hold a men's title of any kind in the promotion.

At Chapter 189: In Darkest Night on January 25, 2026, Falcon defeated Rayne Leverkusen to win the Progress World Women's Championship.

=== Revolution Pro Wrestling (2022–present) ===
Falcon made her debut in Revolution Pro Wrestling at RevPro Summer Sizzler 2022 on July 23, where she unsuccessfully challenged Alex Windsor for the Undisputed British Women's Championship. At RevPro 11th Anniversary Show on August 26, 2023, she competed in a ten-woman Battle Royal to determine the number contender to the Undisputed Women's title, bout won by Dani Luna by last eliminating Safire Reed. At the 2025 edition of the Global Wars UK from August 22, Falcon fell short to Persephone in singles competition. At High Stakes on March 21, 2026, she defeated Mercedes Moné to win both the Bodyslam Scandinavian Championship and the Discovery Scottish Women's Championship. One night later on March 22, 2026, at RevPro Live In Coventry, Falcon defeated Alex Windsor to win the Undisputed British Women's Championship.

== Championships and accomplishments ==
- Alpha Omega Wrestling
  - AOW Women's Championship (2 times)
- Bodyslam Pro Wrestling
  - Bodyslam Women's Championship (1 time, current)
- Discovery Wrestling
  - DW Women's Championship (1 time, current)
- FutureShock Wrestling
  - FSW Women's Championship (1 time)
- Mr Cat's Wrestling
  - Mr Cat's UK Mixed Gender Tag Team Championship (1 time) – with Damon Leigh
- New Generation Wrestling
  - NGW Women's Championship (1 time, current)
- Odyssey Pro Wrestling
  - OPW Women's Championship (1 time)
- Progress Wrestling
  - Progress Tag Team Championship (1 time) – with Charles Crowley
  - Progress World Women's Championship (1 times)
- Pro Wrestling Illustrated
  - Ranked No. 111 of the top 150 female singles wrestlers in the PWI Women's 150 in 2022
- Revolution Pro Wrestling
  - Undisputed British Women's Championship (1 time)
- Rixe Catch
  - Rixe Women's Championship (1 time)
- TNT Extreme Wrestling
  - TNT Undisputed Women's Championship (2 times, current)
  - TNT IGNition Women’s Championship (1 time, current)
  - Women's Level Up Briefcase (2026)
- True Grit Wrestling
  - TGW Women's Championship (1 time, current)
- Wrestle Island
  - Wrestle Island Women's Championship (2 times)
