= Progress Chapter 163: Twisted Metal =

2024 Progress Wrestling event

- Promotional poster of the event
- Promotion: Progress Wrestling
- Date: 25 February 2024
- City: London, England
- Venue: Electric Ballroom
- Attendance: cca. 600

Event chronology
← Previous; Chapter 162: The Light Of The Dragon	Next → Chapter 164: For The Love Of Progress 2

The Progress Chapter 163: Twisted Metal was a professional wrestling event produced by Progress Wrestling. It took place on 25 February 2024, in London, England at Electric Ballroom.

Ten matches were contested at the event. The main event saw Kid Lykos defeat Spike Trivet in a steel cage match to win the PROGRESS World Championship.

== Production ==
=== Storylines ===
The event included matches that each resulted from scripted storylines, where wrestlers portrayed heroes, villains, or less distinguishable characters in scripted events that built tension and culminated in a wrestling match or series of matches. Results were predetermined by Progress' creative writers, while storylines were produced on Progress' events airing on the Demand PROGRESS streaming service.

=== Event ===
The event started with the singles confrontation between Taishi Ozawa and Jack Bandicoot, solded with the victory of the latter. Next up, Alexxis Falcon and Charles Crowley picked up a victory over Danny Black and Gene Munny in tag team competition. The third bout saw Man Like DeReiss outmatch Yoichi in singles competition. Next up, Rhio defeated Emmersyn Jayne by disqualification to secure the sixth consecutive defense of the Progress World Women's Championship in that respective reign. In the fifth bout, Charlie Sterling and Nick Riley defeated Big Damo and Axel Tischer to secure the second consecutive defense of the PROGRESS Tag Team Championship in that respective reign. They were immediately challenged again by Alexxis Falcon and Charles Crowley who defeated them, winning the tag titles and ending their reign at 273 days and two defenses. In the seventh bout, Lizzy Evo defeated Kanji score 2–1 in a best two-out-of-three falls match. Next up, Simon Miller picked up a victory over Rob Drake in singles competition. In the semi main event, Kid Lykos II defeated Bullit in another singles bout.

In the main event, Kid Lykos defeated Spike Trivet to win the PROGRESS World Championship, ending the latter's reign at 546 dats and 17 defenses.

== Results ==
No.	Results	Stipulations	Times
1	Jack Bandicoot defeated Taishi Ozawa by pinfall	Singles match	6:04
2	Cheeky Little Buggers (Alexxis Falcon and Charles Crowley) defeated Danny Black and Gene Munny by pinfall	Tag team match	9:59
3	Man Like DeReiss defeated Yoichi by pinfall	Singles match	13:49
4	Rhio (c) defeated Emersyn Jayne by disqualification	Singles match for the Progress World Women's Championship	10:07
5	Smokin' Aces (Charlie Sterling and Nick Riley) (c) defeated Sanity (Big Damo and Axel Tischer) by pinfall	Tag team match for the PROGRESS Tag Team Championship	12:41
6	Cheeky Little Buggers (Alexxis Falcon and Charles Crowley) defeated Smokin' Aces (Charlie Sterling and Nick Riley) (c) by pinfall	Tag team match for the PROGRESS Tag Team Championship	2:30
7	Lizzy Evo defeated Kanji score (2–1)	Best two-out-of-three falls match	14:51
8	Simon Miller defeated Rob Drake (with Lana Austin) by pinfall	Singles match	7:01
9	Kid Lykos II defeated Bullit by pinfall	Singles match	9:41
10	Kid Lykos (with Kid Lykos II) defeated Spike Trivet (c) (with Smokin' Aces (Charlie Sterling and Nick Riley)) by pinfall	Steel Cage match for the PROGRESS World Championship	33:24
(c) / – the champion(s) heading into the match
