= TNT Extreme Wrestling =

British professional wrestling promotion

- TNT Extreme Wrestling's logo
- Acronym: TNT
- Founded: 2015
- Style: Hardcore Wrestling
- Headquarters: Liverpool, Merseyside, United Kingdom
- Owners: Jay Apter; Lee McAteer; Martyn Best
- Website: tnt-wrestling.co.uk

TNT Extreme Wrestling is a British hardcore professional wrestling promotion established in 2015 and is co-owned by Jay Apter, Lee McAteer and Martyn Best.

== History ==
Since debuting in 2015, the promotion featured a hardcore style of wrestling characterized by hard hitting strikes and extreme hardcore violence on the side. The promotion started hosting its regular shows at the Black-E venue in Liverpool but in time, they switched locations to the O2 Academy and saw many internationally renowned wrestlers, such as Pete Dunne, Mark Andrews, Will Ospreay and James Drake. In 2016, due to gaining popularity in the wrestling scene, the promotion landed back in the heart of the Liverpool nightclub scene at Fusion on Fleet Street, having spent a short time there before landing at the O2. Their re-debut at Fusion saw the launch of the World Tag Wars Tournament, an annual competition which features teams from all around the British and Irish independent circuits.

In 2016, the promotion established its first hardcore title, the Extreme Division Championship which was created to be disputed in deathmatches with a concept which celebrated the brutality, endurance and pain threshold of those willing to participate in such matches. Shortly after settling back in to Fusion, on 5 July 2018, at TNT Going Off Big Time, Walter of Progress Wrestling dethroned the undefeated Joseph Conners for the TNT World Championship, ending a 13 match win streak for the latter. After the shift in the World title scene, as earlier that night, Kasey with the help of Molly Spartan defeated Lana to win the TNT Women championship as the "She-Wolves" stable was born. Walter's and championship reign was short lived, as Jordan Devlin was placed in to the rematch between Conners and Walter to make it a triple threat, with the "Irish Ace" walking out as champion.

In June 2018, the promotion launched "TNT IGNition", a brand new platform for local and nationwide up-and-coming talent. Our debut show saw the introduction of Big Guns Joe, Scott Oberman, Visage, Chase Alexander and Crashboat just to name a few, with LJ Cleary and More Than Hype making their debuts on the second show and All Eyes on Me from 4 October 2018.

On 31 January 2019, the promotion hosted their first ever DOA Deathmatch tournament. The next month, at TNT Merseyside Massacre 2019, the promotion saw the debut of Pac in a match against Rampage Brown and Mark Haskins capturing the vacant TNT World Championship. At the very next event of Supreme Extreme on 18 April, El Phantasmo took on Rey Fenix, and Pac faced of against Pentagón Jr. for the very first time.

Mid 2019, the promotion switched locations again as it set up in Hangar 34 in Liverpool where it has remained until present. TNT IGNition: All Eyes On Me, the first show hosted at Hangar 34 on 4 July, saw the crowning of the first ever TNT IGNition champion, as Soner Dursun out lasted nineteen other competitors in a rumble match. Since moving to Hangar34, TNT has welcomed various worldwide talent such as Rickey Shane Page, Grizzled Young Veterans, Flamita, Jonathan Gresham, Jimmy Lloyd, Eddie Kingston, Ace Austin, Black Taurus and Puma King.

Although 2020 was cut short, the promotion managed to hold the second DOA DeathMatch tournament from which Clint Margera came out victorious. TNT also crowned the first ever Ultra x Champion as Kid Lykos II defeated Robbie X, The OJMO and Ace Austin in the inaugural tournament final. 2020 also saw IGNition return to Fusion! A fresh burst flowed through IGNition, which saw the debut of The Young Guns, Chuck Mambo and YouTube star Simon Miller in the two shows managed at the start of 2020.

=== Partnerships ===
In March 2021, TNT Extreme Wrestling started a new working relationship with the trade union Equity.

In October 2023, the promotion joined the Demand Progress Plus subscription system after working closely with Progress Wrestling.

== Championships ==
As of 16 November 2026

=== Current champions ===
Championship	Current champion(s)	Reign	Date won	Days held	Location	Notes	Ref.
TNT Undisputed World Championship	Tate Mayfairs	1	17 September 2023	1,156+	Liverpool, England	Defeated Che Monet at TNT Vs. GCW.	
TNT Extreme Division Championship	Session Moth Martina	1	14 November 2026	2+	Liverpool, England	Defeated Leonardo Darwin at TNT Cold Day in Hell 2026 in a No Rules Match.	
TNT IGNition Championship	Critchy	1	28 September 2025	414+	Liverpool, England	Defeated MVK at TNT IGNition Aftershock 2025.	
TNT Ultra X Championship	Tom Thelwell	2	25 July 2026	114+	Liverpool, England	Defeated Che Monet and Denzel Mack in a triple threat match for the vacant title at TNT Summer Explosion 2026.	
TNT King of the Ring Crew Championship	Max Brooker	1	4 February 2024	1,016+	Liverpool, England	Defeated Leon Grey at TNT All Eyes On Me 2024.	
TNT Tag Team Championship	Act Two (Benjamin Harland and Jack Knudsen)	1 (1, 1)	28 September 2025	414+	Liverpool, England	Defeated Temple Of Malum (Isaac North and Rob Drake) at TNT Thrill Kill 2025.	
TNT Undisputed Women's Championship	Lucy Sky	2	14 November 2026	2+	Liverpool, England	Defeated Alexxis Falcon at TNT Cold Day in Hell.	
TNT IGNition Women’s Championship	Alexxis Falcon	1	28 June 2026	141+	Liverpool, England	Defeated Lana Austin at TNT Siren's Fury 2026 - Sirens On The Loose by cashing in her Women's Level Up Briefcase, for the unified titles.	
TNT Women's Tag Team Championship	LALLIE (Hollie Barlow and Lana Austin)	1 (1, 1)	4 April 2026	226+	Liverpool, England	Defeated Experience (LA Taylor and Skye Smitson) at TNT IGNition Level Up 2026.	

=== Retired championships ===
Championship	Current champion(s)	Reign	Date won	Days held	Location	Notes	Ref.

== Other Accomplishments ==
=== Tournaments ===
Tournament	Winners	Date won	Notes
World Tag Wars Tournament	Bonesaw & Damien Corvin	6 June 2019	This Tournament lasted from 2 February 2018 to 6 June 2019, different from the most other tournaments which all lasted one day.
DOA Death Match Tournament 2019	Mikey Whiplash	31 January 2019	
DOA Death Match Tournament 2020	Clint Margera	30 January 2020	Due to the Covid-19 pandemic there wasn’t held a DOA Death Match Tournament in 2021.
TNT IGNition Wrestling League 2019	Kameron Solas	16 February 2020	This Tournament lasted from 2 May 2019 to 16 February 2020.
Ultra X Title Tournament 2020	Kid Lykos II	5 March 2020	
Total Carnage Tournament 2021	Session Moth Martina	30 July 2021	
DOA 3 Tournament 2022	Clint Margera	3 February 2022	It was the second time in a row he won the Tournament, which is still the record.
Ultimate X Tournament 2022	Nico Angelo	21 July 2022	
DOA Tournament 2023	Big F'n Joe	7 July 2023	
Thrill Kill Tournament 2023	Paul Robinson	14 July 2023	
TNT IGNition Women's Title Tournament	Lucy Sky	16 September 2023	This Tournament lasted from 17 June 2023 to 16 September 2023.
DOA Tournament 2024	Emersyn Jayne	3 February 2024	
Thrill Kill Tournament 2024	BA Rose	2 June 2024	
DOA Tournament 2025	Rickey Shane Page	29 March 2025	
Thrill Kill Tournament 2025	Tommbie	28 September 2025	
DOA Tournament 2026	Tim Strange	4 April 2026	
TNT/CZW Tournament of Death UK	Jack Harrop	27 September 2026	
Total Carnage Tournament 2026	Lucy Deathmatch	27 September 2026	

=== Rumble Matches ===
Rumble Match	Winner	Date won	Notes
IGNition Rumble 2022	JJ Webb	9 January 2022	
IGNition Rumble 2023	Charles Crowley	14 January 2023	
Rainbow Rumble 2023	Harley Hudson	12 May 2023	
IGNition Rumble 2024	MVK	3 February 2024	
Rainbow Rumble 2024	Che Monet	28 September 2024	
IGNition Rumble 2025	Joseph Conners	25 January 2025	
Rainbow Rumble 2025	Scotty Rawk	27 September 2025	
IGNition Rumble 2026	Trent Seven	31 January 2026	
Rainbow Rumble 2026	Tye Archer	26 September 2026	

=== Level Up Briefcases ===
#	Intergender Level Up Briefcase Match Winner	Date won	Notes
1	Scott Oberman	27 June 2021	This was different from the other Matches, which are elimination Scramble Matches, a one on one Match.
2	Tom Thelwell	26 September 2021	
3	Tom Thelwell	9 January 2022	This was a IGNition career VS. Briefcase Match for the briefcase won by Scott Oberman.
4	Pádraig Quinlan	6 April 2024	

#	Men's Level Up Briefcase Match Winner	Women's Level Up Briefcase Match Winner	Date won	Notes
5	Critchy	Lana Austin	29 March 2025	
6	Tommy Tanner	Alexxis Falcon	4 April 2026	

#	Pride Up Briefcase Match Winner	Date won	Notes
1	Adam Bolt	27 September 2025	

== All-time roster ==
- Anderson Daniels
- Antonio Gonzalez
- Alex Colon
- Alexxis Falcon
- BA Rose
- Bestia 666
- Brandon Lee
- "Broski" Jimmy Lloyd
- Bubblegum
- Charli Evans
- Chase Alcala
- Che Monet
- Chris Ridgeway
- Clint Margera
- Dan Moloney
- Danny Darko
- David Starr
- Declan McCarthy
- Emersyn Jayne
- Harley Hudson
- Isaac North
- Jack Bennett
- Jack Critchlow
- Jimmy Jackson
- Jimmy Lloyd
- Jordan Devlin
- Jordan Oliver
- Joseph Conners
- KC Payne
- KM Lane
- Kid Lykos
- Kid Lykos II
- Lana Austin
- Leon Grey
- Leon Slater
- Lewis Johnson
- LJ Cleary
- Lizzy Evo
- Lucia Lee
- Lucy Sky
- Man Like DeReiss
- Mao
- Mark Haskins
- Mikey Whiplash
- MVK
- Max Brooker
- Meat Wagon
- Mecha Wolf 450
- Michael Caden
- Mike Bird
- Moth 3:16
- Nathan Angel
- PL Dotson
- Paul Robinson
- RPD
- Rhio
- Rob Drake
- Scotty Rawk
- Session Moth Martina
- Soner Dursun
- Tate Mayfairs
- Tom McColl
- Tommbie
- Troy Ryan
- Tyler Adams
- Walter
- Yoshihiko
