= Undisputed British Heavyweight Championship =

Professional wrestling championship

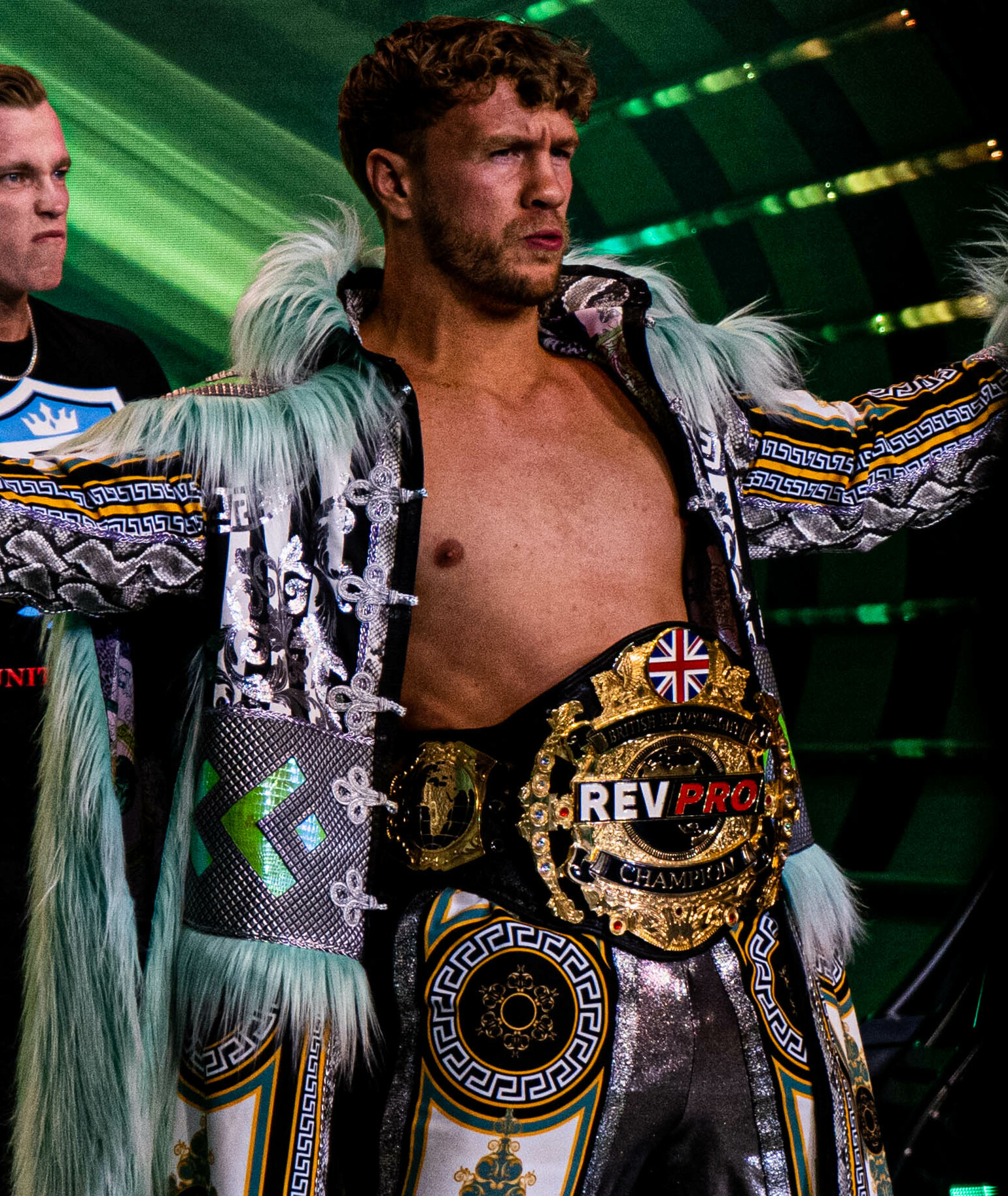
- Will Ospreay with the current title design (2021–present)

Details
- Promotion: Revolution Pro Wrestling
- Date established: 16 July 2005
- Current champion: Connor Mills
- Date won: August 29, 2026

Other names
- IPW:UK Championship (2005–2009); British Heavyweight Championship (2012–2017); Undisputed British Heavyweight Championship (2009-2012, 2017–present)
Statistics
- First champion: Aviv Maayan
- Most reigns: Zack Sabre Jr. (4 reigns)
- Longest reign: Will Ospreay (919 days)
- Shortest reign: Aviv Maayan (1 day)
- Oldest champion: Minoru Suzuki (50 years)
- Youngest champion: Andy Boy Simmonz (22 years, 138 days)
- Heaviest champion: Sha Samuels (107 kg (236 lb))
- Lightest champion: Michael Oku (80 kg (180 lb))

The Undisputed British Heavyweight Championship is a professional wrestling championship owned by the Revolution Pro Wrestling (RevPro/RPW) promotion. The title was created and debuted on 16 July 2005 and is the promotion's principal championship. The current champion is Connor Mills, who is in his first reign. He won the title by defeating Michael Oku at the RevPro 14th Anniversary Show in London, England on 29 August 2026.

The current title was formed after the IPW:UK Championship and the All-England Championship were unified into the Undisputed British Heavyweight Championship, but later became known as simply the "British Heavyweight Championship" after RPW separated itself from International Pro Wrestling: United Kingdom (IPW:UK). The title has been defended in the United States and in Japan through RPW's working relationships with New Japan Pro-Wrestling (NJPW) and Ring of Honor (ROH). In 2018, the championship name was reverted to the "Undisputed British Heavyweight Championship".

== Title history ==
As of 3 October 2026, there have been a total of 33 reigns shared between 23 different champions. Aviv Maayan was the inaugural champion. Zack Sabre Jr. has the most reigns at 4. Will Ospreay's reign is the longest at 919 days, while Aviv Maayan's reign is the shortest at 1 day.

The current champion is Connor Mills, who is in his first reign. He won the title by defeating Michael Oku at the 14th Anniversary in London, England on August 29, 2026.

=== Reigns ===
Key
No.	Overall reign number
Reign	Reign number for the specific champion
Days	Number of days held
+	Current reign is changing daily

No.	Champion	Championship change			Reign statistics		Notes	Ref.
No.	Champion	Date	Event	Location	Reign	Days	Notes	Ref.
IPW:UK
1	Aviv Maayan	16 July 2005	Weekend Of Champions: Night I	Orpington, England	1	1	Maayan defeated Martin Stone and Steve Douglas in a three-way match to become the inaugural champion.	
2	Martin Stone	17 July 2005	Weekend Of Champions: Night II	Orpington, England	1	462		
3	Andy Boy Simmonz	22 October 2006	Extreme Measures III	Orpington, England	1	210	This was a No Disqualification match.	
4	JC Thunder	20 May 2007	Royale Rewards	Orpington, England	1	125		
5	Andy Boy Simmonz	22 September 2007	3rd Anniversary Weekend: Night Two	Orpington, England	2	175	This was a Submission match.	
6	Martin Stone	16 March 2008	Battle Royale: The Last Orpington Stand	Orpington, England	2	189	This was a Last Man Standing match.	
7	Iestyn Rees	21 September 2008	Fourth Anniversary Tour	Bromley, London	1	209		
8	Alex Shane	18 April 2009	Iron Fist	Kent, England	1	148	This was an Iron Fist match.	
9	Leroy Kincaide	13 September 2009	5th Anniversary Show	Kent, England	1	161	Unified the IPW:UK Championship and the All-England Championship into the Undisputed British Heavyweight Championship.	
10	Dave Mastiff	21 February 2010	No Escape	Kent, England	1	448		
11	Sha Samuels	15 May 2011	Sittingbourne Spectacular	Kent, England	1	686	This was a Three-way elimination match also involving Takeshi Morishima. The championship begins to be referred to as the British Heavyweight Championship during this reign.	
RevPro
12	Colt Cabana	31 March 2013	High Stakes	Kent, England	1	349		
13	Marty Scurll	15 March 2014	High Stakes	Greater London, England	1	456	This was a 30-minute Iron Fist match.	
14	A.J. Styles	June 14, 2015	Summer Sizzler	Greater London, England	1	216		
15	Zack Sabre Jr.	16 January 2016	High Stakes	Greater London, England	1	299		
16	Katsuyori Shibata	10 November 2016	RevPro/NJPW Global Wars UK 2016: Night 1	Greater London, England	1	116		
17	Zack Sabre Jr.	6 March 2017	NJPW Hataage Kinenbi	Tokyo, Japan	2	396	The championship was renamed back to the Undisputed British Heavyweight Championship during this reign.	
18	Tomohiro Ishii	6 April 2018	Live In New Orleans	New Orleans, Louisiana	1	86		
19	Minoru Suzuki	July 1, 2018	NJPW Strong Style Evolved UK	Manchester, England	1	105		
20	Tomohiro Ishii	14 October 2018	RevPro/NJPW Global Wars UK 2018	Greater London, England	2	82		
21	Zack Sabre Jr.	4 January 2019	NJPW Wrestle Kingdom 13	Tokyo, Japan	3	239		
22	Hiroshi Tanahashi	31 August 2019	NJPW Royal Quest	Greater London, England	1	15		
23	Zack Sabre Jr.	15 September 2019	NJPW Destruction In Beppu	Beppu, Oita, Japan	4	152		
24	Will Ospreay	14 February 2020	High Stakes	Greater London, England	1	919		
25	Ricky Knight Jr.	21 August 2022	Ten Year Anniversary - Night 2	Greater London, England	1	118		
26	Great-O-Khan	17 December 2022	Uprising	Greater London, England	1	204	Zak Zodiac was a replacement for Ricky Knight Jr.	
27	Michael Oku	9 July 2023	Epic Encounter 2023	Greater London, England	1	412		
28	Luke Jacobs	24 August 2024	RevPro 12th Anniversary Show	Greater London, England	1	119		
29	Michael Oku	21 December 2024	Uprising	Greater London, England	2	216		
30	Ricky Knight Jr.	25 July 2025	Summer Sizzler	Wolverhampton, England	2	29		
31	Sha Samuels	23 August 2025	RevPro 13th Anniversary Show; Night 2	London, England	2	113	This was a Title vs. Career match.	
32	Jay Joshua	14 December 2025	Uprising	Cardiff, Wales	1	175		
33	Michael Oku	7 June 2026	Live in London 108	London, England	3	83		
34	Connor Mills	29 August 2026	RevPro 14 Year Anniversary Show	London, England	1	35+		

== Combined reigns ==
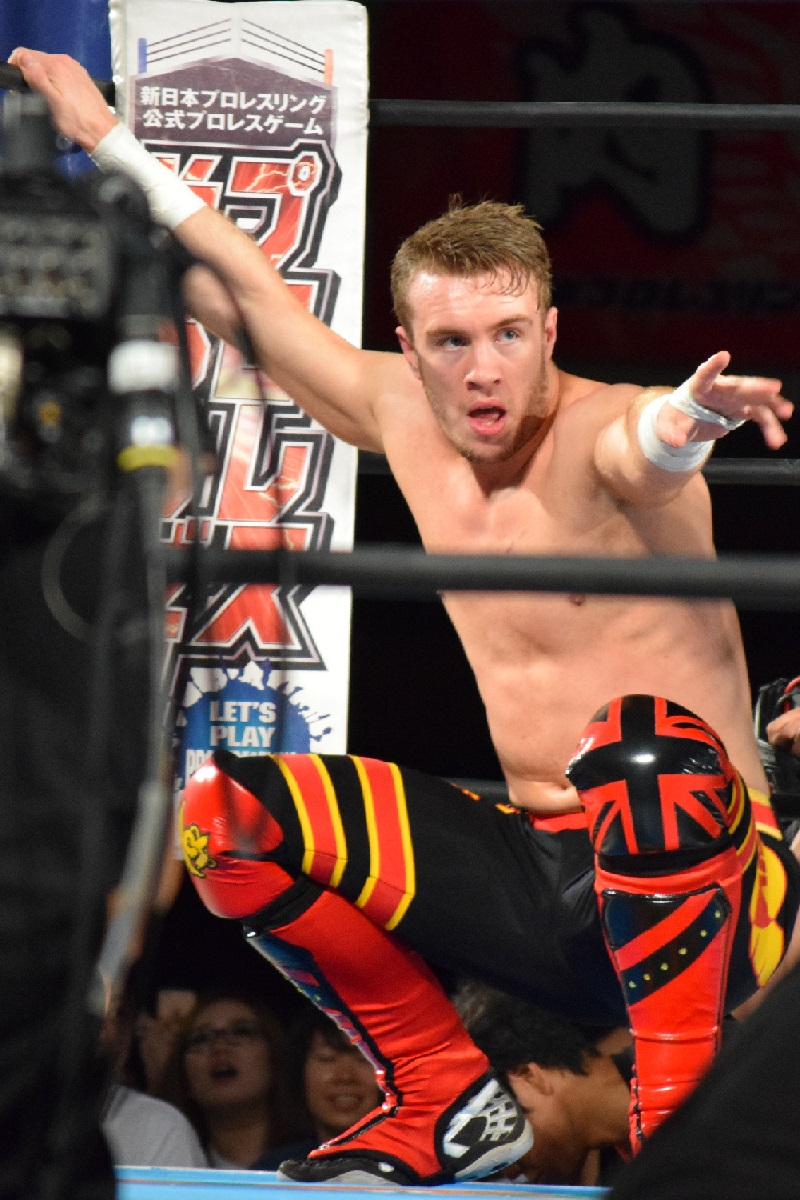
Longest reigning champion at 919 days, Will Ospreay.

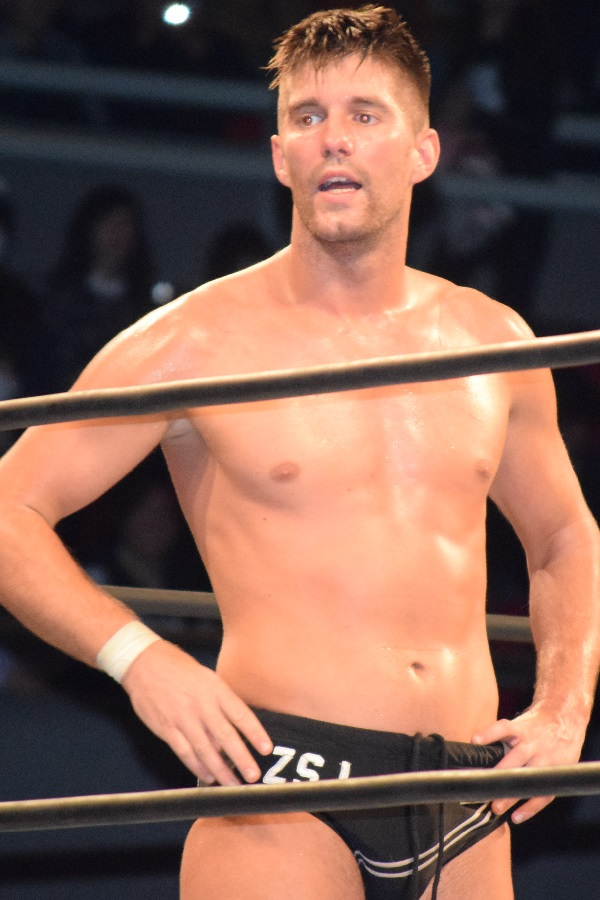
Zack Sabre Jr, record four-time and longest combined reigning champion at 1086 days

As of October 3, 2026.

†	Indicates the current champion

Rank	Wrestler	No. of reigns	Combined days
1	Zack Sabre Jr.	4	1,086
2	Will Ospreay	1	919
3	Sha Samuels	2	799
4	Michael Oku	3	711
5	Martin Stone	2	651
6	Marty Scurll	1	456
7	Dave Mastiff	1	448
8	Andy Boy Simmonz	2	385
9	Colt Cabana	1	349
10	A.J. Styles	1	216
11	Iestyn Rees	1	209
12	Great-O-Khan	1	204
13	Jay Joshua	1	175
14	Tomohiro Ishii	2	168
15	Leroy Kincaide	1	161
16	Alex Shane	1	148
17	Ricky Knight Jr.	2	147
18	JC Thunder	1	125
19	Luke Jacobs	1	119
20	Katsuyori Shibata	1	116
21	Minoru Suzuki	1	105
22	Connor Mills †	1	35+
23	Hiroshi Tanahashi	1	15
24	Aviv Maayan	1	1

== See also ==
- Professional wrestling in the United Kingdom
- RPW Undisputed British Tag Team Championship
- RPW British Cruiserweight Championship
- IPW:UK All-England Championship
- IPW:UK World Championship
