= Charles Crowley =

Charles Crowley may refer to:

- Charles Crowley (American football) (c. 1887–1954), American college football player and coach
- Charles Crowley (wrestler) (born 1992), English professional wrestler
