= Kanji (wrestler) =

English professional wrestler (born 1994)

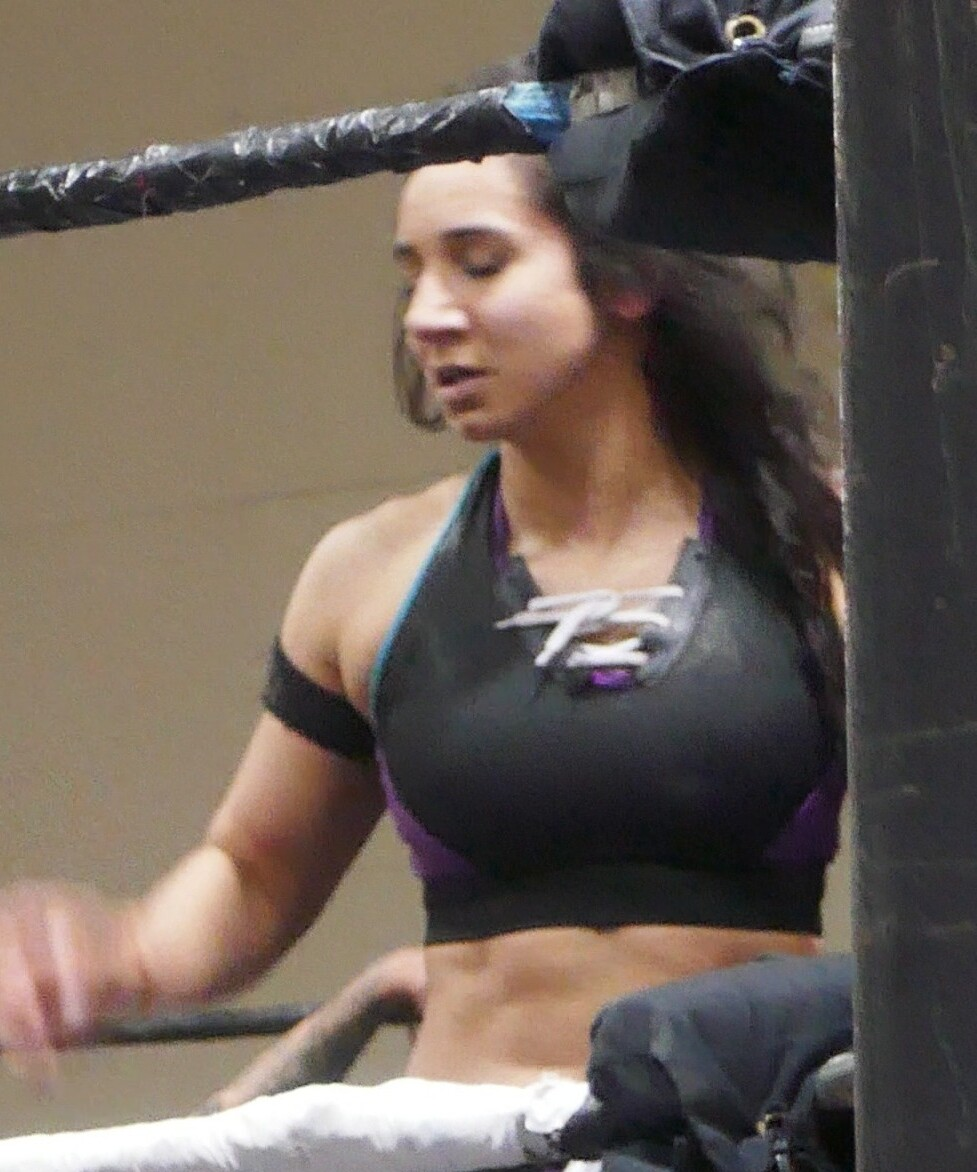
- Kanji in April 2025

Personal information
- Born: Winona Makanji; 23 June 1994 (age 32) Nottingham, Nottinghamshire, England

Professional wrestling career
- Ring name: Kanji
- Billed from: Nottingham, England
- Trained by: Stixx
- Debut: December 9, 2017

Winona Makanji (born 23 June 1994), known mononymously by her ring name Kanji, is an English professional wrestler. She performs on the British independent circuit – predominantly for Revolution Pro Wrestling (RevPro), where she is the current Undisputed British Women's Champion in her first reign.

== Professional wrestling career ==
=== Early career (2018–2019) ===
Kanji was the last Queen Of Southside Champion in Southside Wrestling Entertainment (SWE) when the promotion was taken over by Revolution Pro Wrestling in September 2019.

=== WWE (2019) ===
Kanji briefly competed for WWE's NXT UK branch as indie developmental talent. She made her only appearance at WWE NXT UK #47 on June 14, 2019, where she competed in a number one contendership battle royal for the NXT UK Women's Championship won by Kay Lee Ray and also involving Candy Floss, Isla Dawn, Jazzy Gabert, Jinny, Killer Kelly, Nina Samuels, Piper Niven, Rhio, Rhea Ripley and Xia Brookside.

=== Revolution Pro Wrestling (2021–present) ===
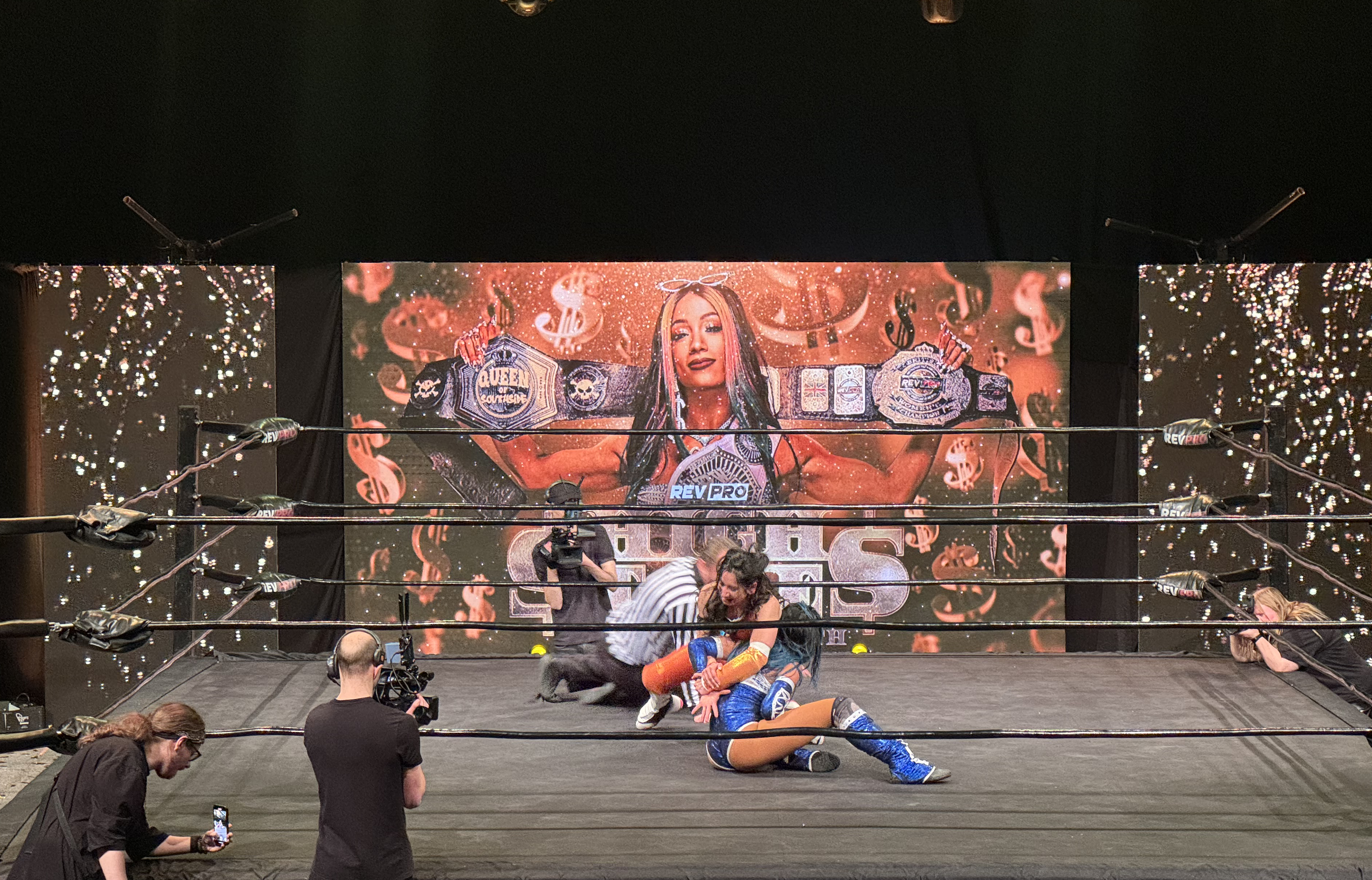
Kanji wrestling Mercedes Moné at RevPro's High Stakes in April 2025

Kanji's first title defense of the Southside Women's title in RevPro was on 7 February 2021, at Epic Encounters 8, where she successfully defended the title against Bobbi Tyler. Kanji continued to hold the title until 17 December 2022, at RevPro Uprising, where she lost the title to Dani Luna.

On August 29, 2026, at RevPro's 14th Anniversary Show, she defeated Alexxis Falcon to win the Undisputed British Women's Championship.

=== Progress Wrestling (2021–present) ===
Kanji made her Progress debut on 27 February 2021, at Chapter 105: Bring The Thunder, winning a Progress Women's Championship #1 contender's match also involving Taonga, Millie McKenzie, Lana Austin, Mercedez Blaze and Alexxis Falcon and Gisele Shaw. Soon after, due to COVID-19 travel restrictions, reigning Progress World Women's Championship Jinny was forced to vacate the title. Therefore, a three match series between Shaw and Kanji was announced to determine the new champion. Kanji won the series 2–1 against Shaw to win the vacant title. Shortly after Shaw won the vacant title at PROGRESS Chapter 117, Kanji defeated Shaw to win the women's title for the second time on 5 June 2022, at Chapter 135: Super Strong Style 16 Tournament Edition 2022. Several months later, she lost the women's title again, this time to Lana Austin, at PROGRESS Chapter 146: They Think It's All Over... on 27 November 2022.

== Championships and accomplishments ==
- Attack! Pro Wrestling
  - Attack! Championship (1 time)
  - Attack! 24:7 Championship (1 time)
  - Weird And Wonderful World Cup (2025)
- Defiant Wrestling
  - Defiant Women's Championship (1 time)
- House Of Pain Wrestling
  - HOP Women's Championship (1 time)
- Progress Wrestling
  - Progress Wrestling World Women's Championship (2 times)
- Pro Wrestling Chaos
  - Maiden of Chaos Championship (1 time)
- Pro Wrestling Illustrated
  - Ranked No. 324 of the top singles wrestlers in the PWI 500 in 2026
  - Ranked No. 42 of the top 150 female singles wrestlers in the PWI Women's 150 in 2021
- Revolution Pro Wrestling
  - Undisputed British Women's Championship (1 time, current)
  - Southside Women's Championship (1 time)
  - Women's Grand Prix (2026)
- Wrestling Resurgence
  - Resurgence Championship (1 time, current)
