= Katsuyori Shibata =

Japanese professional wrestler and trainer

- Shibata in August 2026
- Born: November 17, 1979 (age 47); Kuwana, Mie, Japan
- Professional wrestling career
- Ring name(s): Katsuyori Shibata; Makai #4
- Billed height: 1.83 m (6 ft 0 in)
- Billed weight: 95 kg (209 lb)
- Billed from: Kuwana, Mie, Japan
- Trained by: Antonio Inoki; Kazushi Sakuraba; Kensuke Sasaki; Katsuhisa Shibata; Kotetsu Yamamoto; NJPW Dojo
- Debut: October 10, 1999
- Martial arts career
- Other names: The Wrestler
- Height: 1.83 m (6 ft 0 in)
- Weight: 95 kg (209 lb)
- Division: Middleweight; Light Heavyweight; Heavyweight
- Style: Kickboxing
- Team: Laughter7
- Years active: 2004, 2007–2011

Kickboxing record
- Total: 1
- Wins: 0
- Losses: 1
- By knockout: 1
- Draws: 0

Mixed martial arts record
- Total: 15
- Wins: 4
- By knockout: 2
- By submission: 1
- By decision: 1
- Losses: 10
- By knockout: 4
- By submission: 4
- By decision: 2
- Draws: 1

Other information
- Mixed martial arts record from Sherdog

Katsuyori Shibata (柴田勝頼, Shibata Katsuyori; born November 17, 1979) is a Japanese professional wrestler, commentator, trainer, and former mixed martial artist. He is signed to All Elite Wrestling (AEW), where he is a member of The Opps. He is a former one-time AEW World Trios Champion. He also makes appearances for AEW's sister promotion Ring of Honor (ROH), where he is a former one-time ROH Pure Champion.

Known for his stiff offense, Shibata is widely known most of his time with New Japan Pro-Wrestling (NJPW), as both a wrestler and trainer. In NJPW, he became a three-time NEVER Openweight Champion, one-time IWGP Tag Team Champion (with Hirooki Goto), and one-time winner of the New Japan Cup (in 2017). He is also a former holder of Revolution Pro Wrestling's RPW British Heavyweight Championship. From 2018 to 2023, he served as the head coach of NJPW's dojo in Los Angeles.

== Early life ==
Shibata was born in Kuwana, Mie, on November 17, 1979, the second child of professional wrestler Katsuhisa Shibata (柴田勝久, Shibata Katsuhisa) who excursion to Mexico's EMLL in the early 70s included main eventing the EMLL 37th Anniversary Show and teaming with Karloff Lagarde). Shibata's father Katsuhisa Shibata died on January 16, 2010 due to heart attack at the age of sixty six when Shibata was thirty years old. Shibata has an older sister. He attended Kuwana Kogyo High School in Kuwana, where his classmates included future professional wrestler Hirooki Goto. He was an amateur wrestler during his school days and competed at national level in 1997.

== Professional wrestling career ==
=== New Japan Pro-Wrestling (1999–2005) ===
Shibata made his professional wrestling debut on October 10, 1999, facing close friend Wataru Inoue at a New Japan Pro-Wrestling (NJPW) event. Alongside fellow rookies Hiroshi Tanahashi and Shinsuke Nakamura, Shibata became known as one of the "new Three Musketeers". In 2000, Shibata took part in the 2000 Young Lion Cup, eventually finishing in third place with six points. During the tournament he was involved in a serious incident when he hit Masakazu Fukuda with an elbow drop during a match. Fukuda was in a coma and died four days later in hospital.

Shibata and Wataru worked their way up the junior ranks together, though Shibata was a slight step ahead of Inoue throughout their joint rise, and subsequently challenged for the IWGP Junior Heavyweight Championship first against Kendo Kashin on October 28, 2001, but lost. Shibata and Inoue also challenged for the IWGP Junior Heavyweight Tag Team Championship on two occasions both against Jado & Gedo, but lost both times.

By 2003, Shibata graduated to the heavyweight division and joined the Makai Club wrestling as himself and as Makai #4. From there, he continued to rise in the ranks. In July 2003, Shibata challenged for both the IWGP Tag Team Championship and the IWGP U-30 Openweight Championship but failed to win either title. Shibata then entered the 2003 G1 Climax, where he placed 3rd in his block with 5 points. Shibata continued to grow in 2004. On July 19, 2004, he received his first shot at the IWGP Heavyweight Championship against Kazuyuki Fujita but lost by knockout. One month later, he entered the 2004 G1 Climax and won his block scoring eight points and defeated several former IWGP Champions including Masahiro Chono, Shinsuke Nakamura, and Genichiro Tenryu but would lose in the semi-finals to eventual winner: Hiroyoshi Tenzan. Following the G1, Shibata joined Masahiro Chono's new stable, Black New Japan, where he remained until eventually leaving New Japan in January 2005.

=== Independent circuit (2005–2007) ===
In 2005, Shibata left New Japan, becoming a freelancer and has most notably fought for Big Mouth Loud and Pro Wrestling Noah. One of his more famous matches during his freelancing years was a heated confrontation with former amateur wrestler Jun Akiyama. In Big Mouth Loud, Shibata took on several big names including Satoshi Kojima, Kensuke Sasaki, & Taru. In Noah, Shibata teamed with Kenta on several occasions including challenging for the GHC Tag Team Championship and defeating Go Shiozaki and Mitsuharu Misawa where Shibata pinned the future heavyweight champion: Shiozaki. On January 4, 2006, Shibata returned to New Japan at Toukon Shidou Chapter 1, where he defeated Hiroshi Tanahashi. Shibata's final match for nearly six years took place on December 31, 2006, when he defeated Kazuhiro Hamanaka. By January 2007, Shibata left wrestling to focus on mixed martial arts.

=== Inoki Genome Federation (2011) ===
On December 31, 2011, Shibata returned to professional wrestling to compete on the Inoki Genome Federation's (IGF) Fight For Japan: Genki Desu Ka Omisoka 2011 year end event. At the event, Shibata teamed with fellow pro wrestler-turned-mixed martial artist Kazushi Sakuraba to defeat the team of Shinichi Suzukawa and Atsushi Sawada.

=== Return to NJPW ===
==== Laughter 7 (2012–2015) ====
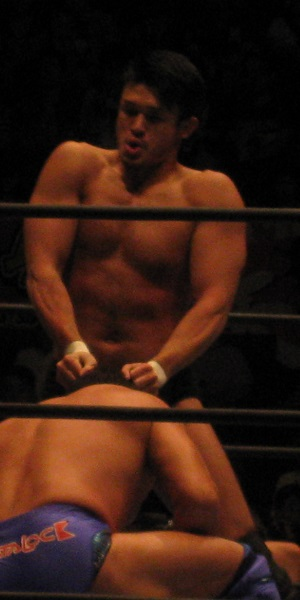
Shibata in September 2013

On August 12, 2012, Shibata, alongside Kazushi Sakuraba, returned to NJPW. Shibata and Sakuraba wrestled their return match on September 23 at Destruction, defeating Hiromu Takahashi and Wataru Inoue in a tag team match. Shibata and Sakuraba, collectively dubbed Laughter7, continued their winning ways at the following two pay-per-views, King of Pro-Wrestling on October 8 and Power Struggle on November 11, both times defeating the team of Togi Makabe and Wataru Inoue. On January 4, 2013, at Wrestle Kingdom 7 in Tokyo Dome, Shibata suffered his first defeat since his return to professional wrestling, when he was defeated by Togi Makabe in a singles grudge match. On January 27, Shibata returned to Pro Wrestling Noah, once again affiliating himself with Kenta. Shibata and Sakuraba returned to their winning ways at the following New Japan pay-per-view, The New Beginning on February 10, where they defeated Hirooki Goto and Wataru Inoue in a tag team match. On April 7 at Invasion Attack, Shibata and Sakuraba suffered their first tag team loss, when they were defeated by Hirooki Goto and Yuji Nagata via referee stoppage, when Sakuraba was injured and unable to continue the match. Shibata and Goto faced off in a singles match on May 3 at Wrestling Dontaku 2013, which ended in a draw. A rematch between the two took place on June 22 at Dominion 6.22, where Shibata was victorious. A third match between the two on July 20 ended in another draw. From August 1 to 11, Shibata took part in the 2013 G1 Climax, where he finished with a record of five wins and four losses, with a loss against Hiroshi Tanahashi on the final day costing him a spot in the finals. On September 8, Shibata and Sakuraba took part in the Wrestle-1 promotion's inaugural event, defeating Masakatsu Funaki and Masayuki Kono in a tag team match. On December 7, Shibata made his in-ring return to Noah, defeating Maybach Taniguchi in a singles match.

On January 4, 2014, at Wrestle Kingdom 8 in Tokyo Dome, Shibata was defeated by Hirooki Goto, who was returning from an injury, which had kept him sidelined for the past five months. The match ended the rivalry between Shibata and Goto and led to the two forming a tag team. The two quickly entered the IWGP Tag Team Championship picture, defeating the reigning champions, Bullet Club (Doc Gallows and Karl Anderson), in a non-title match at New Japan's 42nd anniversary event on March 6. Shibata also expressed interest in challenging for the IWGP Heavyweight Championship, but was told by the reigning champion, Kazuchika Okada, to earn his title shot at the 2014 New Japan Cup. In order to win the tournament, Shibata announced he was bringing back his old finishing move, the octopus hold. Shibata, however, failed in his attempt to win the tournament, losing to Shelton X Benjamin in his second round match on March 22. On April 6 at Invasion Attack 2014, Shibata and Goto received a shot at the IWGP Tag Team Championship, but were defeated by Gallows and Anderson. From July 21 to August 8, Shibata took part in the 2014 G1 Climax, where he finished fourth in his block with a record of six wins and four losses. During the tournament final event on August 10, Shibata and Goto faced off in another singles match, where Shibata was victorious. After entering a rivalry with Shinsuke Nakamura and becoming the number one contender to his IWGP Intercontinental Championship, it was announced that Shibata would be working the full October to November "Road to Power Struggle" tour, his first full tour with New Japan since his return. Shibata received his title shot on November 8 at Power Struggle, but was defeated by Nakamura. Later in the month, Shibata and Goto entered the 2014 World Tag League, where they opened with a three match losing streak, only to come back and win their four remaining matches, winning their block and advancing to the finals. On December 7, Shibata and Goto defeated Doc Gallows and Karl Anderson in the finals to win the 2014 World Tag League. This led to a rematch between the two teams on January 4, 2015, at Wrestle Kingdom 9 in Tokyo Dome, where Shibata and Goto defeated Anderson and Gallows to become the new IWGP Tag Team Champions. Shibata and Goto's reign ended in their first defense on February 11 at The New Beginning in Osaka, where they were defeated by Anderson and Gallows.

On March 8, Shibata and Goto once again faced off in the second round of the 2015 New Japan Cup in a match, where Goto was victorious. On April 5, a rivalry ignited between Shibata and Kazushi Sakuraba, after Sakuraba submitted Shibata in a tag team match at Invasion Attack 2015. The two faced off on July 5 at Dominion 7.5 in Osaka-jo Hall in a match, where Shibata was victorious. From July 20 to August 14, Shibata took part in the 2015 G1 Climax, where he finished in the middle of his block with a record of four wins and five losses.

==== NEVER Openweight Champion (2016–2017) ====
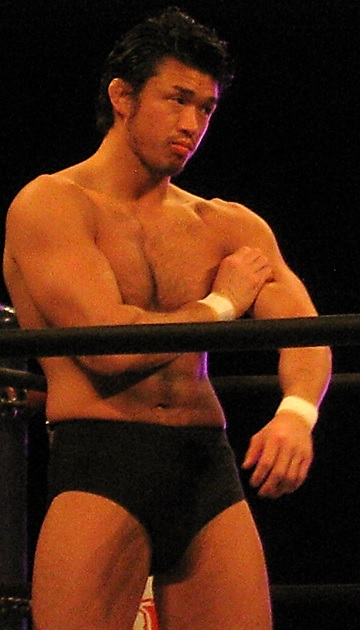
Shibata in March 2015

On January 4, 2016, at Wrestle Kingdom 10, Shibata won his first singles title in NJPW, when he defeated Tomohiro Ishii for the NEVER Openweight Championship. He made his first successful title defense on February 11 at The New Beginning in Osaka in a rematch against Ishii. On March 3, NJPW announced that Shibata had signed a one-year deal with the promotion, ending his 11-year run as a freelancer. Shibata made his next title defenses against NJPW veterans, defeating Satoshi Kojima on March 19 and Hiroyoshi Tenzan on April 10. On May 3 at Wrestling Dontaku 2016, Shibata lost the title to Yuji Nagata in his fourth defense. Shibata regained the title from Nagata on June 19 at Dominion 6.19 in Osaka-jo Hall. He made his first successful title defense on July 3 against Tomoaki Honma. From July 22 to August 13, Shibata took part in the 2016 G1 Climax, where he finished with a record of five wins and four losses. Shibata failed to advance to the finals due to losing to Evil on the final day. Through NJPW's relationship with Ring of Honor (ROH), Shibata made his debut for the American promotion on August 19 at Death Before Dishonor XIV, where he defeated Silas Young. The following day, Shibata unsuccessfully challenged Bobby Fish for the ROH World Television Championship. This led to a match on September 17 at Destruction in Tokyo, where Shibata successfully defended the NEVER Openweight Championship against Fish. The following month at King of Pro-Wrestling, Shibata also successfully defended the title against Fish's tag team partner Kyle O'Reilly. After this, he made a brief return to Pro Wrestling Noah as part of their working relationship with New Japan Pro Wrestling, teaming with Juice Robinson in a victory against Go Shiozaki and Mayback Taniguchi on October 22 at Autumn Navigation 2016 Day 6, and defeating Go Shiozaki in a singles match on October 23, at Great Voyage 2016 in Yokohoma Vol. 2. On November 5 at Power Struggle, Shibata lost the title to Evil. On November 15, Shibata regained the NEVER Openweight Championship from Evil on NJPW's Wrestling World 2016 event in Singapore. He lost the title to Hirooki Goto on January 4, 2017, at Wrestle Kingdom 11 in Tokyo Dome.

==== Injury and hiatus (2017–2021) ====
On March 20, Shibata defeated Bad Luck Fale in the finals to win the 2017 New Japan Cup. Having earned the right to challenge for any heavyweight belt of his choosing, Shibata called out Kazuchika Okada and challenged him to a match for the IWGP Heavyweight Championship. On April 9 at Sakura Genesis 2017, Shibata was defeated by Okada in the IWGP Heavyweight Championship match. Following the match, Shibata collapsed backstage and was rushed to a hospital, where it was discovered that he had a subdural hematoma, which required emergency surgery. Shibata's injury was similar to that which killed mixed martial artist Tim Hague a couple of months later. The injury was caused by Shibata's repeated use of a headbutt as a signature move, something he had been doing regularly since the summer of 2016. This, combined with severe dehydration, caused Shibata to also experience some paralysis on the right side of his body. On April 13, Dave Meltzer reported that it was believed that Shibata would never be cleared to wrestle again. It was later reported that while Shibata was "probably" never going to wrestle again, NJPW were looking to sign him full-time as a coach. Shibata made an appearance at the 2017 G1 Climax finals on August 13, tearfully stating "I am still alive! That is all."

On March 4, in the midst of his recovery, it was announced that Shibata would be the head coach for New Japan's new dojo located in Los Angeles, California, where he trained the likes of Karl Fredericks, Clark Connors and Alex Coughlin. Shibata would remain the head of coach of the LA Dojo until 2023. On August 12, Shibata accompanied Hiroshi Tanahashi to ringside for his G1 Climax 28 Finals match against Kota Ibushi where Tanahashi would be victorious.

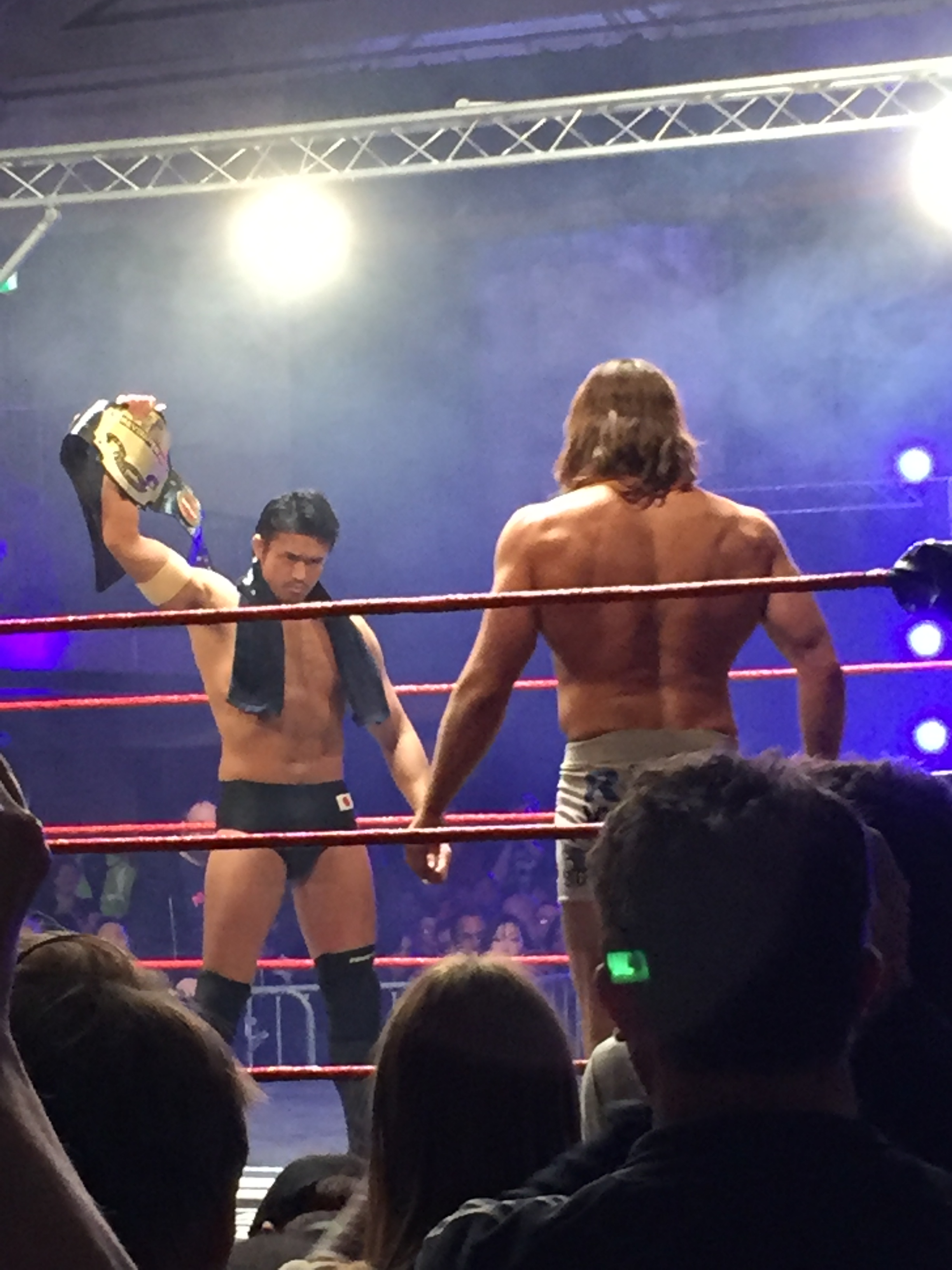
Shibata (left) defending the British Heavyweight Championship against Matt Riddle in January 2017

On June 9, 2019, at Dominion 6.9 in Osaka-jo Hall, Shibata returned to introduce the debuting KENTA. On August 12, on the final night of G1 Climax 29, KENTA joined Bullet Club, resulting in Shibata rushing the ring to fight him, ultimately ending with Shibata being beat down by KENTA and other members of Bullet Club. This marked the first time Shibata had engaged in physical wrestling since his injury. At Power Struggle, Shibata was once again ambushed by KENTA during the main event of Jay White and Hirooki Goto as he was attempting to aid his former tag partner.

==== In-ring return and departure (2021–2023) ====
On the final night of G1 Climax 31 on October 21, 2021, Shibata wrestled Zack Sabre Jr. in a 5-minute UWF rules exhibition which ended in a draw. Afterwards, Shibata spoke to the crowd and said that he feels good, and the next time he steps in that ring it will be a proper wrestling match. On December 15, 2021, Shibata made the announcement that he would wrestle at the January 4, 2022, Wrestle Kingdom 16 event, his first official match since April 2017. In this event, Shibata defeated Ren Narita. Shibata departed from NJPW in December 2023 after signing with AEW, ending his 11-year tenure in the promotion.

In October 2024, it was revealed that the relationship between Shibata and NJPW had soured due to Shibata "going into business for himself" by audibling his Wrestle Kingdom 16 match with Narita into a proper wrestling match, when it was scheduled to be under "catch wrestling rules" with no strikes being allowed.

==== Sporadic appearances (2025–2026) ====
Shibata returned to NJPW on January 4, 2025 at Wrestle Kingdom 19, where he came to the aid of Hiroshi Tanahashi from an attack by House of Torture. Shibata then challenged Tanahashi to a match the next night at Wrestle Dynasty, which Tanahashi accepted. At Wrestle Dynasty, Shibata wrestled Tanahashi in a 5-minute exhibition which ended in a draw.

On January 4, 2026 at Wrestle Kingdom 20, Shibata made an appearance as part of Tanahashi's retirement ceremony.

=== Revolution Pro Wrestling (2016–2017, 2023) ===
In addition to the United States, through their working relationship with NJPW, he debuted for UK-based Revolution Pro Wrestling (RPW) at their Summer Sizzler 2016 event on July 10, unsuccessfully challenging Zack Sabre Jr. for the British Heavyweight Championship. In November 2016, Shibata returned to RPW at Global Wars UK, a cross-promoted show with NJPW. On first night, he defeated Zack Sabre Jr. to win the British Heavyweight Championship, and then successfully defended the title against Chris Hero on second night. On January 21, 2017, Shibata made another successful title defense against Matt Riddle at RPW's High Stakes event. He lost the title back to Sabre at NJPW's 45th anniversary show on March 6 thanks to an assist from Minoru Suzuki and Suzuki Gun.

Shibata made his return to RPW at the company's 11th anniversary show on August 26, 2023, teaming with El Phantasmo to defeat Bullet Club War Dogs, David Finlay and Gabriel Kidd.

=== All Elite Wrestling / Ring of Honor (2022–present) ===
==== Debut; ROH Pure Champion (2022–2023) ====
On June 26, 2022, Shibata appeared at AEW x NJPW: Forbidden Door to save Orange Cassidy from a post-match beatdown from United Empire. Later, on the November 2 episode of Dynamite, Shibata once again saved Cassidy from an attack by Pac, and signed for a match against Cassidy for the AEW All Atlantic Championship, on the November 4 edition of Rampage. In his AEW in-ring debut, Shibata was defeated by Cassidy, the duo shook hands and posed after the match.

On March 31, 2023, Shibata made his Ring of Honor (ROH) debut, in which he defeated Wheeler Yuta at Supercard of Honor for the ROH Pure Championship. Shibata made his televised AEW return on the June 2, 2023 edition of Rampage, defeating Lee Moriarty to retain his ROH Pure Championship. On July 23, 2023 at Death Before Dishonor. Shibata successfully defended his title against Daniel Garcia. In November, since he returned to Japan, Shibata dropped the title back to Yuta at Rampage. On December 23, 2023, it was announced that Shibata was officially signed to AEW.

==== The Opps (2024–present) ====
On the March 16, 2024 edition of AEW Collision, Shibata returned to AEW in a losing effort against Bryan Danielson. Later on in the show, Shibata saved the Blackpool Combat Club from a post-match attack from Lance Archer and The Righteous. On the May 1 episode of Dynamite, Shibata failed to win the FTW Championship from "The Learning Tree" Chris Jericho after interference from Big Bill. Shibata would then find himself aligning with the newly formed tag team of Samoa Joe and Hook. During the duo's feud with the Premier Athletes Shibata would often act as a cameraman for their attacks. The trio would go on to defeat Jericho, Bill, and Jeff Cobb in a trios match at Forbidden Door. At WrestleDream, Shibata unsuccessfully challenged Jack Perry for the AEW TNT Championship.

On the February 12, 2025 episode of Dynamite, the trio of Shibata, Hook, and Samoa Joe were named "The Opps." On April 16 at Dynamite: Spring BreakThru, Shibata and Joe teamed with Powerhouse Hobbs to defeat the Death Riders (Jon Moxley, Claudio Castagnoli, and Wheeler Yuta) for the AEW World Trios Championship. This marked Shibata's first championship in AEW. On May 25 at Double or Nothing, The Opps teamed with Kenny Omega, Swerve Strickland, and Willow Nightingale to defeat the Death Riders (Jon Moxley, Claudio Castagnoli, Marina Shafir, and Wheeler Yuta) and The Young Bucks (Matthew Jackson and Nicholas Jackson) in an Anarchy in the Arena match. On July 12 at All In: Texas, The Opps successfully defended their titles against the Death Riders and Gabe Kidd. On August 24 at Forbidden Door Zero Hour, The Opps successfully defended their titles against Bullet Club War Dogs (Clark Connors, Drilla Moloney, and Robbie X). On October 18 at WrestleDream, The Opps turned heel after attacking "Hangman" Adam Page after Joe failed to defeat Page for the AEW World Championship.

On January 14, 2026 taping of Collision: Maximum Carnage, the Opps lost the trios titles to Page and JetSpeed (Kevin Knight and "Speedball" Mike Bailey), which aired on tape delay on January 17, ending their reign at 273 days (276 days as recognized by AEW due to the tape delay).

== Mixed martial arts career ==
Shibata debuted in mixed martial arts on May 15, 2004, at JF Jungle Fights 2 where he defeated Webster Dauphiney by an arm triangle choke in Round 1. Shibata returned to MMA in 2007 where he joined the Fighting and Entertainment Group (FEG) promoted K-1 Hero's, in his K-1 Hero's debut on March 12, 2007, at Hero's 8, he defeated Yoshihisa Yamamoto by TKO in 9 seconds. After two victories, Shibata went on a five fight losing streak. He lost to Ralek Gracie at K-1 Hero's: Middleweight Tournament Opening Round by submitting to an armbar. Shibata then lost to Kazushi Sakuraba at K-1 Hero's Tournament Final once again submitting to an armbar. Shibata fought his last K-1 Hero's fight at K-1 Olympia Hero'S 2007 in Korea on October 28, 2007, against Heo Min Seok. Shibata lost the fight by TKO in the 2nd round.

In 2008, Shibata began fighting for FEG's new organization: Dream. His first fight at Dream was a loss to Jason "Mayhem" Miller at Dream 3 by TKO. His next fight was against Yoshihiro Akiyama losing to him by Submission. Shibata then fought at Deep where he drew with Yasuhito Namekawa at Deep: 38 Impact. He then lost to Hayato Sakurai by TKO at Dynamite!! 2008. In a shocking start, Shibata charged across the ring and almost fell through the ropes when Sakurai dodged him, and then unloaded all his offensive with the intention to end the fight early, but Hayato took him down and punished him methodically until the stoppage.

After going winless for two years, Shibata would score his biggest victory to date at Dream 8 when he defeated Ikuhisa Minowa by Unanimous Decision. Later that year at Dream 12, he defeated fellow New Japan Pro-Wrestling alumni Tokimitsu Ishizawa by TKO. At Dynamite!! 2009, Shibata lost to Hiroshi Izumi by unanimous decision.

Shibata returned to Deep for two appearances in 2010. On June 6, 2010, he lost to Young Choi by unanimous decision. On October 24, he then faced Deep Light Heavyweight Champion Yoshiyuki Nakanishi at Deep: 50th Impact which he lost by TKO.

His most recent fight was a defeat to Ryuta Sakurai via TKO on August 26, 2011, at Deep: 55 Impact.

== Championships and accomplishments ==
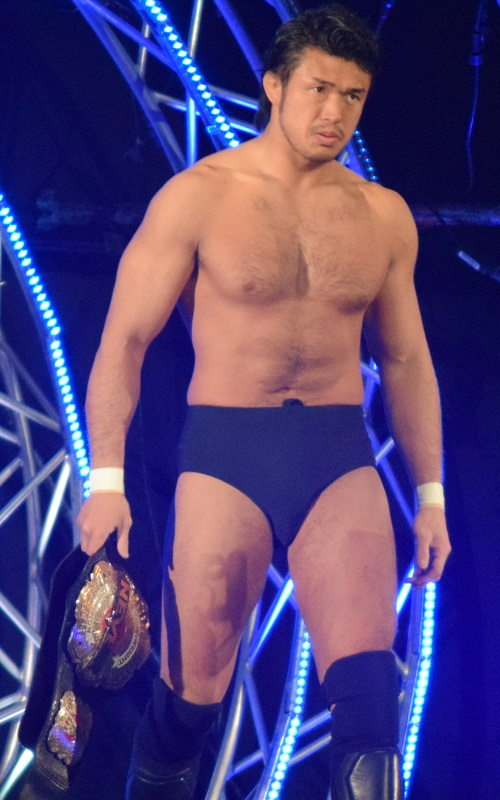
Shibata is a three-time NEVER Openweight Champion.

- All Elite Wrestling
  - AEW World Trios Championship (1 time) – with Samoa Joe and Powerhouse Hobbs
  - FTW Contender Series (2024) – shared with Hook
- New Japan Pro-Wrestling
  - IWGP Tag Team Championship (1 time) – with Hirooki Goto
  - NEVER Openweight Championship (3 times)
  - New Japan Cup (2017)
  - World Tag League (2014) – with Hirooki Goto
  - Fighting Spirit Award (2004)
  - Tag Team Best Bout (2004) with Masahiro Chono vs. Hiroyoshi Tenzan and Shinsuke Nakamura on October 24
- Pro Wrestling Illustrated
  - Ranked No. 23 of the top 500 singles wrestlers in the PWI 500 in 2017
- Revolution Pro Wrestling
  - British Heavyweight Championship (1 time)
- Ring of Honor
  - ROH Pure Championship (1 time)
- Tokyo Sports
  - Fighting Spirit Award (2017)
- Wrestling Observer Newsletter
  - Best Brawler (2013)

== Kickboxing record ==
Kickboxing record
0 wins (0 KOs), 1 loss, 0 draws
Date	Result	Opponent	Event	Location	Method	Round	Time	Record
2003-11-03	Loss	Hiromi Amada	NJPW: Yokohama Dead Out	Yokohama, Japan	KO (left knee to the body)	2	2:08	0-1
Legend: Win Draw/No contest Notes

== Mixed martial arts record ==
Professional record breakdown
16 matches	4 wins	11 losses
By knockout	2	5
By submission	1	4
By decision	1	2
Draws	1	

Res.	Record	Opponent	Method	Event	Date	Round	Time	Location	Notes
Loss	4–11–1	Ryuta Sakurai	TKO (punches)	Deep: 55 Impact	August 26, 2011	2	3:04	Tokyo, Japan	Middleweight bout.
Loss	4–10–1	Satoshi Ishii	Submission (kimura)	K-1 World Max 2010 World Championship Tournament Final	November 8, 2010	1	3:30	Tokyo, Japan	
Loss	4–9–1	Yoshiyuki Nakanishi	TKO (punches)	Deep: 50 Impact	October 24, 2010	1	4:06	Tokyo, Japan	Catchweight (189.6 lb) bout.
Loss	4–8–1	Young Choi	Decision (unanimous)	Deep: Cage Impact 2010 in Osaka	June 6, 2010	3	5:00	Osaka, Japan	
Loss	4–7–1	Hiroshi Izumi	Decision (unanimous)	Dynamite!! The Power of Courage 2009	December 31, 2009	3	5:00	Saitama, Saitama, Japan	Return to Heavyweight.
Win	4–6–1	Tokimitsu Ishizawa	TKO (punches)	Dream 12	October 25, 2009	1	4:52	Osaka, Japan	
Win	3–6–1	Ikuhisa Minowa	Decision (unanimous)	Dream 8	April 5, 2009	2	5:00	Nagoya, Japan	Catchweight (194 lb) bout.
Loss	2–6–1	Hayato Sakurai	TKO (punches)	Fields Dynamite!! 2008	December 31, 2008	1	7:01	Saitama, Japan	
Draw	2–5–1	Yasuhito Namekawa	Draw	Deep: 38 Impact	October 23, 2008	3	5:00	Tokyo, Japan	Catchweight (189.6 lb) bout.
Loss	2–5	Yoshihiro Akiyama	Technical Submission (ezekiel choke)	Dream 5: Lightweight Grand Prix 2008 Final Round	July 21, 2008	1	6:34	Osaka, Japan	
Loss	2–4	Jason Miller	TKO (punches)	Dream 3: Lightweight Grand Prix 2008 Second Round	May 11, 2008	1	6:57	Saitama, Japan	
Loss	2–3	Heo Min Seok	TKO (punches)	Hero's 2007 in Korea	October 28, 2007	2	1:31	Seoul, South Korea	
Loss	2–2	Kazushi Sakuraba	Submission (armbar)	Hero's 10	September 17, 2007	1	6:20	Yokohama, Japan	Middleweight debut.
Loss	2–1	Ralek Gracie	Submission (armbar)	Hero's 9	July 16, 2007	1	3:05	Yokohama, Japan	Light Heavyweight debut.
Win	2–0	Yoshihisa Yamamoto	TKO (punches)	Hero's 8	March 12, 2007	1	0:09	Nagoya, Japan	
Win	1–0	Webster Dauphiney	Submission (arm-triangle choke)	Jungle Fight 2	May 15, 2004	1	0:52	Manaus, Brazil	

== See also ==
- List of professional wrestlers by MMA record
