= Undisputed British Women's Championship =

Professional wrestling women's championship

- The Undisputed British Women's Championship belt.

Details
- Promotion: Revolution Pro Wrestling
- Date established: 7 January 2018
- Current champion: Kanji
- Date won: 29 August 2026

Other names
- RevPro British Women's Championship (2018); RevPro Undisputed British Women's Championship (2018 – present)
Statistics
- First champion: Jinny
- Most reigns: Jamie Hayter and Gisele Shaw and Alex Windsor (2 reigns)
- Longest reign: Alex Windsor (1st reign, 769 days)
- Shortest reign: Alex Windsor (2nd reign, 92 days)
- Oldest champion: Mina Shirakawa (36 years, 242 days)
- Youngest champion: Jamie Hayter (23 years, 41 days)
- Heaviest champion: Jamie Hayter (143 lb (65 kg))
- Lightest champion: Zoe Lucas (114 lb (52 kg))

The Undisputed British Women's Championship is a women's professional wrestling championship owned by the Revolution Pro Wrestling (RevPro/RPW) promotion. The title was created and debuted on 7 January 2018 as British Women's Championship. There have been a total of 13 reigns shared between 10 different champions. Kanji is the current champion in her first reign. She won the title by defeating Alexxis Falcon on 29 August 2026 at the RevPro 14 Year Anniversary Show.

== History ==
On 7 January 2018, Jinny became the inaugural RevPro British Women's Championship after defeating Deonna Purrazzo in the finals of an eight-woman single-elimination tournament.

In 2019, RevPro absorbed the England based independent promotion Southside Wrestling Entertainment (SWE). Following that all SWE championships would eventually be unified with their RevPro counterparts. This included SWE's Queen of Southside Championship, which was unified with the RevPro British Women's Championship to become the Undisputed British Women's Championship, with the champion using both the RevPro and SWE belts to represent the title.

=== Inaugural championship tournament (2018) ===
Quarterfinals
Zoe Lucas	Pin
Zan Phoenix
Deonna Purrazzo	Sub
Sammii Jayne
Nina Samuels	Pin
Jinny
Millie McKenzie	Pin
Charli Evans

Semifinals
Zoe Lucas	Sub
Deonna Purrazzo
Jinny	Pin
Millie McKenzie

Final
Deonna Purrazzo	Pin
Jinny

== Reigns ==
As of 16 November 2026, there have been thirteen reigns between ten different champions, and one vacancy. Jinny was the inaugural champion. Gisele Shaw and Jamie Hayter are tied for the most reigns at two. Alex Windsor has the longest reign at 769 days in her first reign while her second reign is the shortest at 92 days. Hayter is the youngest champion at 23 years old. Mina Shirakawa is the oldest champion, at 36 years old. Kanji is the current champion in her first reign. She won the title by defeating Alexxis Falcon at RevPro 14 Year Anniversary Show on 29 August 2026 in London, England.

Key
No.	Overall reign number
Reign	Reign number for the specific champion
Days	Number of days held
+	Current reign is changing daily

No.	Champion	Championship change			Reign statistics		Notes	Ref.
No.	Champion	Date	Event	Location	Reign	Days	Notes	Ref.
1	Jinny	7 January 2018	At the Cockpit 25	Marylebone, Greater London, England	1	147	Defeated Deonna Purrazzo in the tournament final to become the inaugural champion. The title was renamed to Undisputed British Women's Championship during this reign.	
2	Jamie Hayter	3 June 2018	In Southampton 3	Southampton, England	1	182		
3	Zoe Lucas	2 December 2018	At the Cockpit 35	Marylebone, Greater London, England	1	439		
4	Gisele Shaw	14 February 2020	High Stakes	York Hall, London, England	1	359		
5	Jamie Hayter	7 February 2021	Epic Encounters 8	Portsmouth, England	2	133		
—	Vacated	27 June 2021	—	—	—	—	Vacated after Jamie Hayter decided to attend a WWE try-out instead of a RevPro event	
6	Gisele Shaw	4 July 2021	Live at the Cockpit 51	London, England	2	126		
7	Alex Windsor	7 November 2021	At the NOTpit 55	London, England	1	769		
8	Dani Luna	16 December 2023	Uprising	London, England	1	252		
9	Mina Shirakawa	24 August 2024	RevPro 12th Anniversary Show	London, England	1	134		
10	Mercedes Moné	5 January 2025	Wrestle Dynasty	Tokyo, Japan	1	349	This was a Winner Takes All match, also for Moné's NJPW Strong Women's Championship. This was an co-promoted All Elite Wrestling–Consejo Mundial de Lucha Libre–New Japan Pro-Wrestling–Ring Of Honor–World Wonder Ring Stardom event.	
11	Alex Windsor	20 December 2025	AEW Collision: Holiday Bash	Manchester, England	2	92	Aired via tape delay on 20 December 2025. This was an All Elite Wrestling event.	
12	Alexxis Falcon	22 March 2026	RevPro Live In Coventry	Coventry, England	1	160		
13	Kanji	29 August 2026	RevPro 14 Year Anniversary Show	London, England	1	79+		

== Combined reigns ==
As of 16 November 2026.

†	Indicates the current champion

Rank	Wrestler	No. of reigns	Combined days
1	Alex Windsor	2	864
2	Gisele Shaw	2	485
3	Zoe Lucas	1	439
4	Mercedes Moné	1	349
5	Jamie Hayter	2	315
6	Dani Luna	1	252
7	Alexxis Falcon	1	160
8	Jinny	1	147
9	Mina Shirakawa	1	134
10	Kanji †	1	79+
