= RevPro Anniversary Show =

Professional wrestling supercard by RevPro

Anniversary Show
- Promotion: Revolution Pro Wrestling
- First event: Seven Year Anniversary
- Event gimmick: Celebrating the anniversary of the promotion's first event in 2012

RevPro Anniversary Show is a major professional wrestling event produced by Revolution Pro Wrestling (RPW), which is held annually in August since 2019 (with the exception of 2020 due to COVID-19 pandemic) to celebrate the anniversary of the promotion's first event Summer Sizzler, which took place on August 26, 2012.

Hailed as the promotion's biggest event since the first edition in 2019, Anniversary Show has generated hype by featuring matches and major appearances by internationally renowned stars such as Jushin Liger's last match in the UK, which headlined the Seven Year Anniversary event.

The eleventh edition of the Anniversary Show took place at the All In weekend, on August 26, 2023 at the Copper Box Arena in London, England. It was RevPro's biggest event in history, which generated hype by featuring a main event between partner promotion New Japan Pro Wrestling stars Shingo Takagi and Will Ospreay. Mickie James was also announced to make her debut for RevPro at the event. The event drew a record-setting crowd for the promotion at 4,072. The event was widely discussed in the wrestling media after Chris Jericho made his surprise debut for the promotion by attacking Will Ospreay after the main event to build up their scheduled match at All In.

== Winners, dates, venues and main events ==
Event	Date	City	Venue	Main event	Ref.
Seven Year Anniversary	August 18, 2019	Cheltenham, Gloucestershire, England	Cheltenham Town Hall	Jushin Liger and Michael Oku vs. Chris Brookes and Hikuleo	
Nine Year Anniversary	August 21, 2021	Manchester, England	Victoria Warehouse	Ricky Knight Jr. (c) vs. Shota Umino for the Undisputed British Heavyweight Championship	
Ten Year Anniversary	August 20, 2022	London, England	York Hall	Will Ospreay (c) vs. Mike Bailey for the Undisputed British Heavyweight Championship	
Ten Year Anniversary	August 21, 2022	London, England	York Hall	Will Ospreay (c) vs. Ricky Knight Jr. for the Undisputed British Heavyweight Championship	
11 Year Anniversary	August 26, 2023	London, England	Copper Box Arena	Shingo Takagi vs. Will Ospreay	
12 Year Anniversary	August 24, 2024	London, England	Copper Box Arena	Michael Oku (c) vs. Luke Jacobs for the Undisputed British Heavyweight Championship	
13 Year Anniversary/Global Wars UK	August 22, 2025	London, England	Crystal Palace National Sports Centre	Francesco Akira vs. Leon Slater	
13 Year Anniversary	August 23, 2025	London, England	Crystal Palace National Sports Centre	Ricky Knight Jr. (c) vs. Sha Samuels for the Undisputed British Heavyweight Championship	
14 Year Anniversary	August 29, 2026	London, England	OVO Arena Wembley	Michael Oku (c) vs. Connor Mills for the Undisputed British Heavyweight Championship	
