= Revolution Pro Wrestling =

British professional wrestling promotion

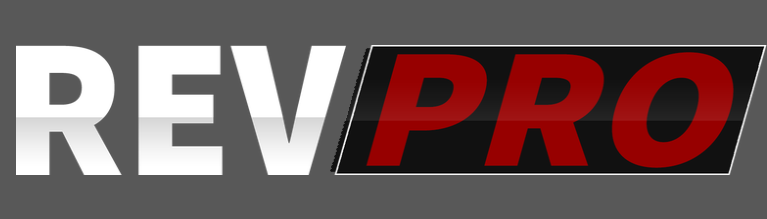
- Revolution Pro Wrestling's logo
- Acronym: RevPro; RPW
- Founded: 26 August 2012
- Style: Professional wrestling Sports entertainment
- Headquarters: Portsmouth, England
- Founder: Andy Quildan
- Owner: Andy Quildan
- Split from: International Pro Wrestling: United Kingdom
- Website: RevolutionProWrestling.com

Revolution Pro Wrestling (RevPro/RPW) is a British professional wrestling promotion founded on 26 August 2012 by Andy Quildan after separating from International Pro Wrestling: United Kingdom.

Revolution Pro Wrestling currently has partnerships with several internationally based promotions including US-based All Elite Wrestling (AEW), Japan's New Japan Pro-Wrestling (NJPW) and Mexico's Consejo Mundial de Lucha Libre (CMLL). American independent company Global Force Wrestling (GFW), also has worked with RPW in the past.

Top international wrestlers who have worked for RevPro, include WWE performers Kurt Angle, AJ Styles, Rey Mysterio, Kevin Owens, Apollo Crews, Finn Bálor, Karl Anderson, Luke Gallows, Kalisto, Sami Zayn, Shinsuke Nakamura, Killian Dain, Noam Dar, Tommaso Ciampa, and Adam Cole.

== History ==
=== Early history (2012–2019) ===
On 26 August 2012, at Summer Sizzler International Pro Wrestling: United Kingdom's (IPW:UK) booker Andy Quildan broke with the company to ensure the high standards he set to the promotion would be maintained. Quildan would bring with him the British Heavyweight, Tag Team and Cruiserweight Championships to the promotion. RPW would also book talent from other promotions such as Prince Devitt, Big Damo and Noam Dar, whom later were signed by WWE. With the rising popularity of RPW, it would become one of the biggest promotions in the British independent circuit.

RPW would begin a series of international collaborations and partnerships with other promotions. On 25 July 2014, RPW announced a working agreement with Global Force Wrestling (GFW). On 5 April 2015, RPW hosted the first non-ICW English defence of the ICW World Heavyweight Championship as part of the At Our Best card when Drew Galloway defended the ICW title along with the EVOLVE and DGUSA Open the Freedom Gate Championships against Doug Williams.

On 18 July 2015, RPW established a working agreement with New Japan Pro-Wrestling as part of their "New IWGP Conception", a global expansion strategy centered on their international partnerships. The agreement also led to NJPW wrestlers making regular appearances for the promotion.

In May, RPW hosted a qualifying match for the WWE Cruiserweight Classic. The first co-promoted shows with NJPW were Uprising and Global Wars UK, which took place in October 2015. On 3 March 2016 RPW released their own OTT streaming service the RPW On Demand. On 16 March, announced a working agreement with Pro-Wrestling: EVE, which would also feature various title defenses of the Pro-Wrestling:EVE Championship and Pro-Wrestling:EVE events airing on the demand for the RPW On Demand. On 23 March, RPW launched a YouTube series the RevPro TV, which airs on Mondays.

On 8 June 2017, RPW announced the British J-Cup, a tournament based on NJPW's Super J-Cup for cruiserweight wrestlers from all over the world. In August 2017, RPW partnered with American promotion Ring of Honor (ROH) and Mexican Consejo Mundial de Lucha Libre (CMLL) for the War of the Worlds UK, which featured participation from the promotion. On 22 September, RPW announced that content from Over The Top Wrestling would also be available on RPW On Demand.

On 13 November, RPW announced the creation of its fourth active title the British Women's Championship, On 30 November, RPW reach a deal with NJPW to officially sell their merchandise from the RPW shop, becoming their second European carrier of their licensed merchandise. On 30 August 2018, RPW signed a television deal with FreeSports, where it premiered on Wednesday and Thursday, 5 and 6 September 2018, in a live special held at the York Hall in London, England. On 3 October, it was announced the Queen of the Ring tournament for their women's division.

=== Acquiring Southside Wrestling Entertainment (2019–2021) ===
On 18 September 2019, RevPro announced they took over Southside Wrestling Entertainment (SWE) operations.

SWE was a promotion operating out of Cambridgeshire, England, which ran events from 2010 to 2019. They promoted internationally known names like Drew Galloway, Chris Hero, Tyler Bate, Pete Dunne, TAJIRI, MJF, Gabriel Kidd, Noam Dar, Tommy Dreamer and Kevin Steen, among others.

Previous SWE title holders had included:– Will Ospreay, Mark Haskins, Ethan Page, Tommy End, Kris Travis, PJ Black, Kay Lee Ray, Stevie Boy, BT Gunn, Rampage Brown, Mike Bailey, Kip Sabian, Davey Richards, Andrew Everett, Trey Miguel, Nixon Newell, Shigehiro Irie, Ricky Knight Jr., Rockstar Spud, Jade, Melina and numerous others.

The SWE Heavyweight Championship, SWE Speed King Championship, SWE Tag Team Championship and SWE Women's Championship were defended on RevPro events before eventually being vacated or unified with their own active titles.

=== New partnerships (2021–present) ===
In 2021, Revolution Pro Wrestling established a relationship with Major League Wrestling.

On 3 August 2023, the CMLL and Revolution Pro Wrestling announced their alliance beginning with their first joint event, Fantastica Mania UK.

== Training school ==
Revolution Pro Wrestling hosts a professional wrestling school in Portsmouth, England. It was founded in August 2012 and run by Andy Quildan. The school runs 4 trainee level shows a year for them to showcase their ability in front of a live audience. They teach all the basic elements of professional wrestling as well as other vital parts of being a wrestler.

== Championships ==
=== Current champions ===
As of October 18, 2026

=== Men's division ===
Singles

Championship	Current champion(s)	Reign	Date won	Days held	Successful defenses	Location	Notes	Ref.
Undisputed British Heavyweight Championship	Connor Mills	1	August 29, 2026	50+	0	London, England	Defeated Michael Oku at RevPro 14 Year Anniversary Show	
Undisputed British Cruiserweight Championship	Cameron Khai	1	October 17, 2026	1+	0	Wolverhampton, England	Defeated Titán in a tournament final on Show 2 of Fantastica Mania UK to win the vacant title. Previous champion Leyton Buzzard vacated the title due to suffering an ACL injury.	

==== Tag team ====
Championship	Current champion(s)	Reign	Date won	Days held	Successful defenses	Location	Notes	Ref.
Undisputed British Tag Team Championship	FTR (Dax Harwood and Cash Wheeler)	1	August 29, 2026	50+	0	London, England	Defeated Cowboy Way (Thomas Shire and 1 Called Manders) at RevPro 14 Year Anniversary Show	

=== Women's division ===
Championship	Current champion(s)	Reign	Date won	Days held	Location	Notes	Ref.
Undisputed British Women's Championship	Kanji	1	August 29, 2026	50+	London, England	Defeated Alexxis Falcon at RevPro 14 Year Anniversary Show	

=== Former champions ===
Championship	Last champion(s)	Date retired	Notes
Southside Heavyweight Championship	Ricky Knight Jr.	18 July 2021	Ricky Knight Jr. retired the championship and proclaimed himself the British Heavyweight Champion, using the old British Heavyweight Championship belt.
Southside Speed King Championship	Michael Oku	13 September 2020	Defeated Ricky Knight Jr. to unify the title with the Undisputed British Cruiserweight Championship.
Southside Tag Team Championship	Rampage Brown and The Great-O-Kharn	24 November 2019	Defeated Mike Bailey and Mao to unify the title with the Undisputed British Tag Team Championships.
Southside Women's Championship	Alex Windsor	9 July 2023	Defeated Skye Smitson, Dani Luna and Hyan in a four-way match to unify the title with the Undisputed British Women's Championship.

== Events ==
=== Marquee events ===
- High Stakes
- Epic Encounter
- Revolution Rumble
- Summer Sizzler
- Anniversary Show
- Uprising

=== Collaborated events ===
- Global Wars UK (with NJPW)
- Strong Style Evolved UK (with NJPW)

=== Tournaments ===
Tournament	Last winners	Date won
British J-Cup	Nino Bryant	22 June 2025
Great British Tag League	Diamond Eyes (Jay Joshua and Connor Mills)	23 August 2025
Women's Grand Prix	Kanji	26 July 2026

== RevPro Hall of Fame ==
Inductees
Jushin Thunder Liger
James Castle
Kurtis "Mad Kurt" Chapman
Ryan Smile

== See also ==
- Professional wrestling in the United Kingdom
- Professional wrestling promotions in the United Kingdom
