= Dani Luna =

English professional wrestler (born 1999)

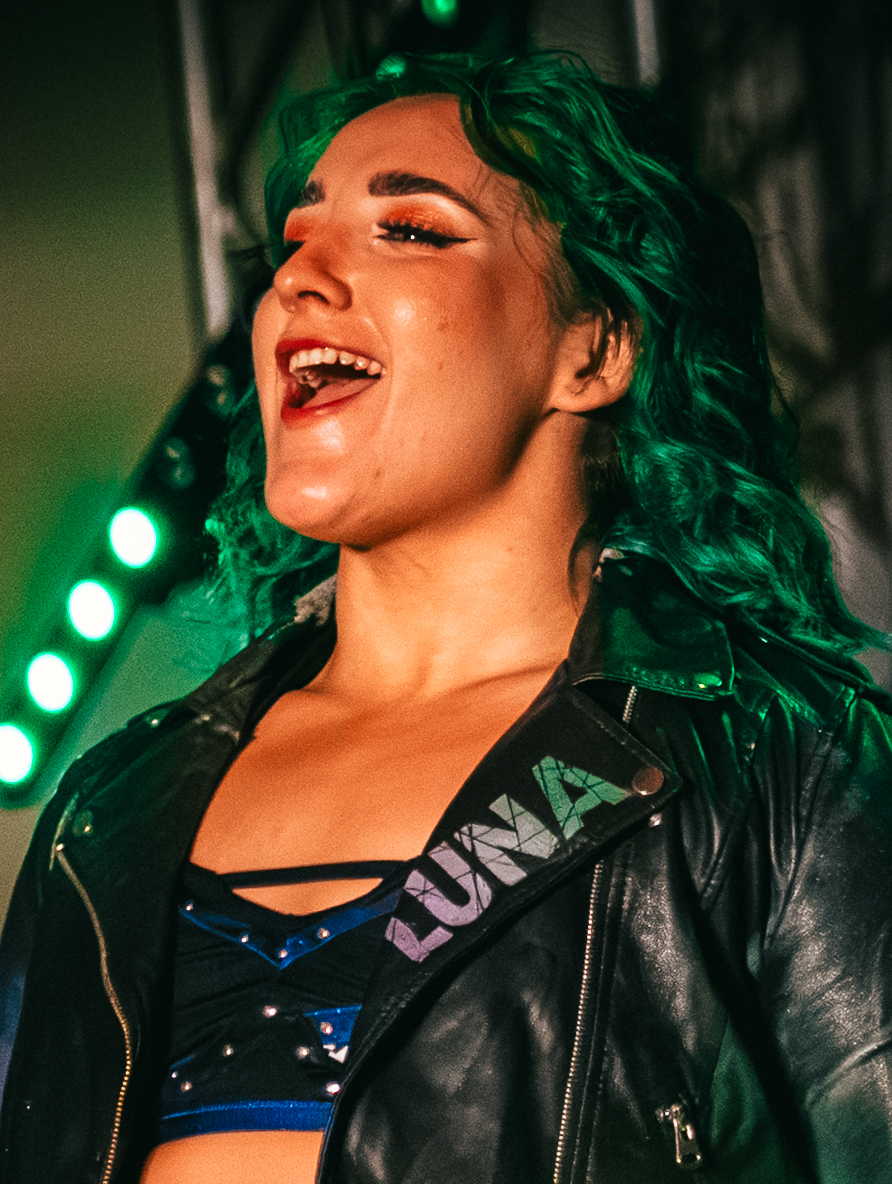
- Luna in April 2025

Personal information
- Born: Chloe Smyth; 2 March 1999 (age 27) Crowland, Lincolnshire, England

Professional wrestling career
- Ring name(s): ChloChlo; Chloe Smyth; Dani Luna
- Billed height: 5 ft 4 in (1.63 m)
- Billed weight: 139 lb (63 kg)
- Billed from: London, England
- Trained by: Justin Sysum; Luke Savory; Mike Hitchman
- Debut: 3 December 2016

Chloe Smyth (born 2 March 1999), better known by the ring name Dani Luna, is an English professional wrestler. She is signed to All Elite Wrestling (AEW) and also makes appearances on the British independent circuit. She is known for her time in WWE, where she performed on the NXT UK brand, and Total Nonstop Action Wrestling (TNA), where she is a former two-time TNA Knockouts World Tag Team Champion with Jody Threat.

== Professional wrestling career ==
=== Early career (2016–2019) ===
Smith made her wrestling debut on 3 December 2016, under her real name, and wrestled in the English promotion Evolution, where she was defeated by Lana Austin. Two months later, she reappeared in Evolution, losing a 2 on 1 handicap match to Mya Mae and Sierra Loxton. In 2017, she made her debut for British Empire Wrestling. After a few losses, she decided to appear in various other promotions such as Preston City Wrestling, Dragon Pro Wrestling, International Pro Wrestling: United Kingdom and Pro Wrestling Chaos. During this time she was able to win three titles.

=== WWE (2019–2022) ===
Luna made her WWE debut on the 3 July 2019 episode of NXT UK, teaming with Mercedez Blaze in a 2 on 1 handicap loss to Jazzy Gabert. She appeared again on the 31 July episode, where she lost to Rhea Ripley. On the 25 September episode of NXT UK, Luna lost to Nina Samuels for a third time.

On 31 January 2020, Luna signed a contract with WWE. On the 6 February episode of NXT UK, she lost to Piper Niven. On the 12 March episode of NXT UK, she defeated Amale by disqualification when she was attacked by NXT UK Women's Champion Kay Lee Ray. On the 19 March episode of NXT UK, she challenged Ray for the NXT UK Women's Championship but lost the match. In 2021, Luna formed a group with Flash Morgan Webster and Mark Andrews called Subculture. On 18 August 2022, it was announced that Luna had been released from her WWE contract.

=== British independent circuit (2022–present) ===
Luna returned to the independent circuit after her WWE NXT UK release, working for Progress Wrestling, Pro Wrestling Chaos, Fife Pro Wrestling Asylum, One Pro Wrestling and numerous others.

=== Revolution Pro Wrestling (2022–present) ===
On 17 December at RevPro Uprising, Luna won the Southside Women's Championship after defeating Kanji. She lost the title to Skye Smitson on 26 March 2023, at Revolution Rumble. On 16 December, at Uprising 2023, Luna won the Undisputed British Women's Championship, defeating Alex Windsor. On 24 August 2024 at RevPro 12th Anniversary Show, Luna lost the Undisputed British Women's Championship to Mina Shirakawa, ending her reign at 252 days.

=== Impact Wrestling / Total Nonstop Action Wrestling (2023–2026) ===
==== Early appearances (2023–2024) ====
On the 12 May 2023 episode of Impact Wrestling, it was announced that Webster and Andrews (accompanied by Luna) would challenge ABC (Ace Austin and Chris Bey) for the Impact World Tag Team Championship at Under Siege marking Luna's first Impact Wrestling appearance. On 1 June, Luna had her first match in Impact, where she lost to Jody Threat. On the July 27 episode of Impact Wrestling, Luna picked up her first win in Impact, as she teamed with Trinity to defeat The Coven (KiLynn King and Taylor Wilde).

Luna continued to sporadically compete in Impact Wrestling. She lost in singles matches against competitors like Deonna Purrazzo on the September 7 episode of Impact Wrestling, and Jordynne Grace at Turning Point. On 21 December, it was announced by the newly-renamed TNA Wrestling that Luna had signed a full-time contract with the promotion. Luna's first match as a contracted TNA performer occurred on January 13, 2024, at Hard to Kill, where she competed in an Ultimate X match to determine the number one contender for the TNA Knockouts World Championship. Gisele Shaw won the match.

==== Spitfire (2024–2025) ====
Luna joined forces with Jody Threat as the two began feuding with MK Ultra (Killer Kelly and Masha Slamovich). As part of the rivalry, Luna got her first win in singles competition in TNA by defeating Killer Kelly on the February 15 episode of Impact!. Luna and Threat subsequently formed a tag team called Spitfire. At Sacrifice, Spitfire defeated MK Ultra to win the TNA Knockouts World Tag Team Championship, marking Luna's first championship win in TNA. At Rebellion, Spitfire successfully defended the title against Decay (Havok and Rosemary). On May 3 at Under Siege, Threat and Luna were defeated by Masha Slamovich and her new partner Alisha Edwards, ending their reign at 56 days.

Spitfire continued their rivalry against The Malisha (Alisha Edwards and Masha Slamovich), unsuccessfully challenging them for the Knockouts World Tag Team Championship at Slammiversary. At Emergence, Spitfire teamed with Jordynne Grace to defeat Malisha and Ash by Elegance in a six-woman tag team match. At Victory Road, Spitfire defeated Slamovich and Tasha Steelz (substituting for an injured Alisha Edwards) to win the Knockouts World Tag Team Championship for a second time. Spitfire would retain the title during the following months against Carlee Bright and Kendal Grey on Impact!, Wendy Choo and Rosemary at Bound for Glory, and Ash by Elegance and Heather by Elegance at Genesis. However, they lost the titles to Ash and Heather at Sacrifice, ending their second reign at 182 days. On 23 May 2025 at Under Siege, Spitfire was defeated by Ash and Heather by Elegance, forcing Luna and Threat to disband as a result of a pre-match stipulation.

==== Doomsday (2025–2026) ====
On the August 21 episode of Impact!, Luna competed in a six-woman gauntlet match to determine the number one contender to the Knockouts World Championship, being eliminated by Indi Hartwell in the second-to-last match. Luna attacked Hartwell after the latter tried to show her respect, turning heel in the process. Jody Threat, Luna's former tag team partner and the final entrant in the match, pleaded with Luna to compose herself but Luna struck her down, inadvertently making Threat the winner by disqualification. Luna had explained to Threat that she attacked Hartwell "for her," but was furious after hearing Threat ask TNA Director of Authority Santino Marella to reverse the decision of the gauntlet match, and declared that she had enough of not getting what she deserved. On the September 4 episode of Impact!, Luna fought Hartwell and Threat in a three-way match to determine a proper challenger to the Knockouts World Championship at Bound for Glory, which was won by Hartwell after pinning Threat. On October 12 at Bound for Glory, Luna competed in the Call Your Shot Gauntlet match, eliminating Rosemary before being eliminated by The Home Town Man.

Luna entered into a feud with Indi Hartwell, which began on the September 18 episode of Impact!, where Hartwell won by disqualification after Luna used a chair. They met again on the November 13 episode of Impact!, this time Luna won after Hartwell wrestled a chair away and used it on her, resulting in another disqualification. A day later, at Turning Point, Luna lost to Hartwell in a No Disqualification match. On the December 11 episode of Impact!, Luna defeated Hartwell in a Dog Collar match. The following week, Luna called out Knockouts World Champion Léi Yǐng Lee for a future title match, to which Lee accepted. In the first weeks of 2026, Luna went on to decimate Lee and the rest of the Knockouts division, going by the metonym "Doomsday" Dani Luna. Lee and Luna's title match was eventually made official for Genesis on January 17. Unfortunately, two days before the event, Luna had to pull out of the match due to travel-related issues. On February 14 at No Surrender, Luna made her return to the promotion, interrupting the Knockouts World Championship match between Lee and NXT's Arianna Grace. On March 28 at Sacrifice, Luna fought Lee and Grace in a three-way match for the title, being pinned by the latter. Three days later, Fightful Select reported that TNA granted Luna's release from the promotion. On the April 9 episode of Impact!, Luna wrestled her last match for the company by facing Jada Stone in a losing effort.

=== All Elite Wrestling (2026–present) ===
Luna made her All Elite Wrestling (AEW) on 26 September 2026 at All Out, where she answered the open challenge of AEW TBS Champion Persephone but failed to win the title.

== Championships and accomplishments ==
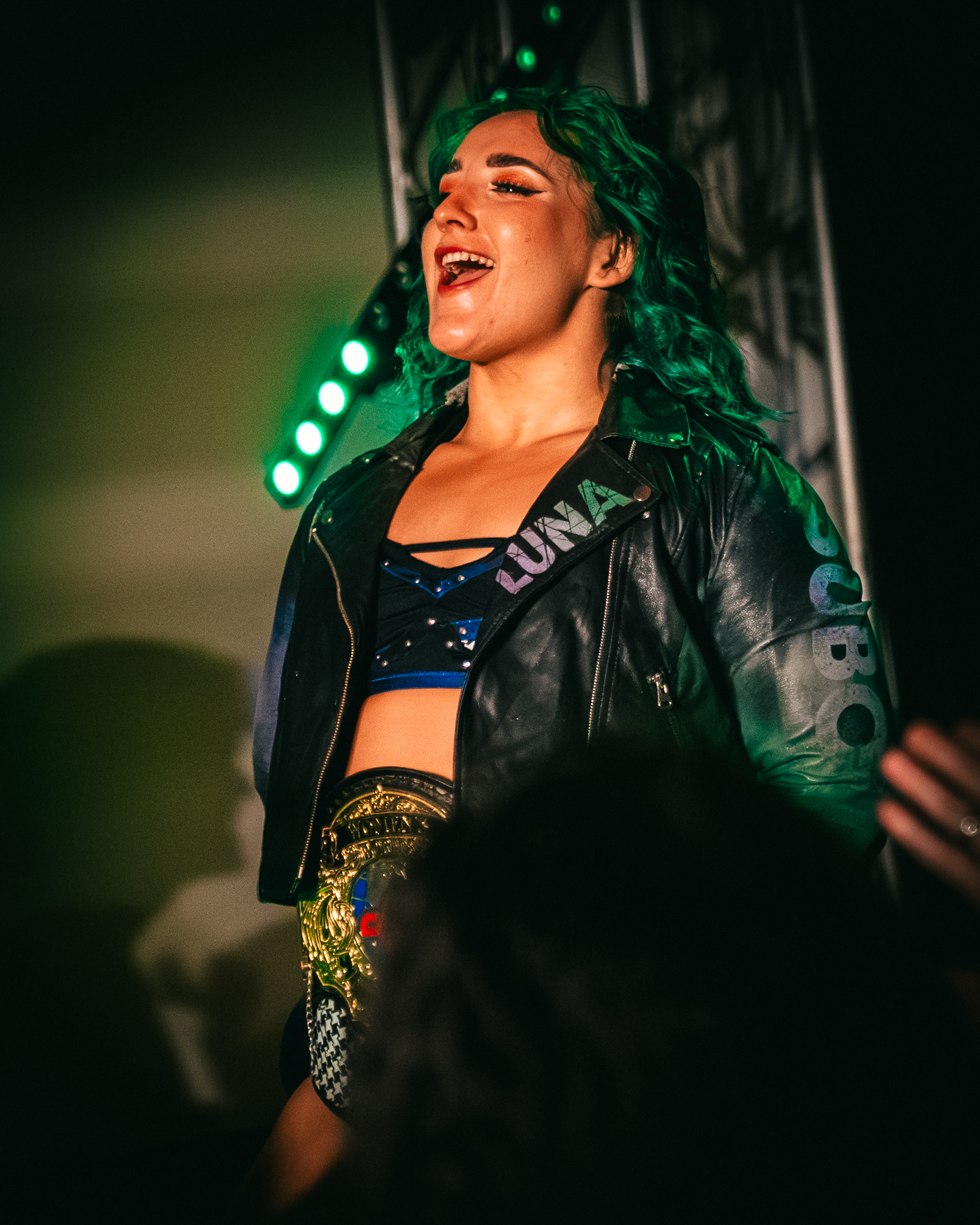
Luna is a former one-time DPW Women's Worlds Champion.

- Attack! Pro Wrestling
  - Attack! Championship (1 time)
- Deadlock Pro-Wrestling
  - DPW Women's Worlds Championship (1 time)
  - Battle Of The Best Tournament (2024)
- Dragon Pro Wrestling
  - Celtic Crown Women's Championship (1 time, final)
- Pro Wrestling Chaos
  - All Wales Championship (1 time)
  - Maiden of Chaos Championship (2 time)
- Pro Wrestling Illustrated
  - Ranked No. 458 of the top 500 wrestlers in the PWI 500 in 2026
  - Ranked No. 23 of the top 250 women's wrestlers in the PWI Women's 250 in 2024
- Pro Wrestling SOUL
  - SOUL Women's Championship (1 time, inaugural, final)
  - SOUL Women's Championship Tournament (2019)
- Revolution Pro Wrestling
  - RevPro British Women's Championship (1 time)
  - Southside Women's Championship (1 time)
- Total Nonstop Action Wrestling
  - TNA Knockouts World Tag Team Championship (2 times) – with Jody Threat
  - TNA Year End Awards
    - Knockouts Tag Team of the Year (2024) – with Jody Threat
