= List of Revolution Pro Wrestling tournaments =

List of tournaments held by RevPro

Revolution Pro Wrestling has held a variety of different professional wrestling tournaments competed for by professional wrestlers that are part of their roster.

== Sporadic tournaments ==
=== Extreme Measures ===
Extreme Measures was an eight-man tournament, in which wrestlers competed in four singles matches and the winners competed in a four-way elimination match in the final. The tournament took place at Christmas Cracker on December 8, 2013.

Semifinals
El Ligero
Josh Bodom
Dave Mastiff
Rampage Brown
Marty Scurll
Uhaa Nation
Mark Andrews
Sha Samuels

Final
El Ligero
Rampage Brown
Marty Scurll
Mark Andrews

=== British Cruiserweight Championship Tournament ===
A four-man tournament for the vacant British Cruiserweight Championship was held at the inaugural Live at the Cockpit event on January 3, 2016 after previous champion Andrew Everett vacated the title due to injury.

Semifinals
Josh Bodom
Morgan Webster
El Ligero
Pete Dunne

Final
Morgan Webster
Pete Dunne

=== British Women's Championship Tournament ===
A two-night tournament to crown the inaugural British Women's Champion was held in 2018. The first round was contested at Live at the Cockpit 24 on January 6, 2018 and the semifinals and the final round were held at Live at the Cockpit 25 on January 7, 2018.

First Round (Live at the Cockpit 24)
Deonna Purrazzo
Sammii Jayne
Zan Phoenix
Zoe Lucas
Jinny
Nina Samuels
Charli Evans
Millie McKenzie

Semifinals (Live at the Cockpit 25)
Deonna Purrazzo
Zoe Lucas
Jinny
Millie McKenzie

Final (Live at the Cockpit 25)
Deonna Purrazzo
Jinny

=== Undisputed British Tag Team Championship #1 Contender's Tournament ===
A tag team tournament was held to determine the #1 contender for the Undisputed British Tag Team Championship at Epic Encounter. The eight-team tournament was held between September 5, 2018 and January 11, 2019.

First Round
World of Pro Wrestling	HxC	Pin
10/26	Roppongi 3K
World of Pro Wrestling	Aussie Open	Pin
11/2	Team WhiteWolf
World of Pro Wrestling	Arrows of Hungary	Pin
11/9	Hunter Brothers
World of Pro Wrestling	Cassius and Chuck Mambo	Pin
11/16	Jody Fleisch and Jonny Storm

Semifinals
World of Pro Wrestling	Roppongi 3K	Pin
12/7	Aussie Open
World of Pro Wrestling	Hunter Brothers	Pin
11/30	Jody Fleisch and Jonny Storm

Final
New Year's Resolution	Aussie Open	Pin
1/11	Hunter Brothers

=== Road to Royal Quest ===
It was a tag team tournament held to determine the #1 contenders for the IWGP Tag Team Championship at Royal Quest on August 31, 2019.

=== Revolution Rumble Entry Tournament ===
A four-man tournament was held at Unfinished Business on March 19, 2023, where the winner would qualify as a participant in the Revolution Rumble.

Semifinals
David Francisco	Pin
Yota Tsuji	13:27
Joshua James	Pin
Samuel Hawkes	9:08

Final
Yota Tsuji	Pin
Joshua James	15:33

== British J-Cup ==
British J-Cup is a professional wrestling single elimination tournament produced by Revolution Pro Wrestling (RPW). The tournament features junior heavyweight wrestlers from all over the world. It consists of singles matches which wrestlers win to qualify to the final, a four-way elimination match. The winner of the tournament, if not the reigning champion, is awarded a title shot for the Undisputed British Cruiserweight Championship.

=== Dates and venues of finals ===
Year	Tournament winner	Times won	Date	Runners-up	City	Venue	Ref.
2017	Jushin Liger	1	July 8, 2017	Kushida, Marty Scurll and Will Ospreay	London, England	Walthamstow Assembly Hall	
2018	El Phantasmo	1	September 9, 2018	Kushida, Rich Swann and Rocky Romero	Manchester, England	Bowlers Exhibition Centre	
2019	Michael Oku	1	November 24, 2019	El Phantasmo, Pac and Robbie Eagles	London, England	York Hall	
2021	Mike Bailey	1	November 6, 2021	Connor Mills, Luke Jacobs and Michael Oku	Stevenage, Hertfordshire	Gordon Craig Theatre	
2022	Robbie X	1	October 22, 2022	Lee Hunter, Leon Slater and Will Kaven	Stevenage, Hertfordshire	Gordon Craig Theatre	
2023	Leon Slater	1	October 21, 2023	Harrison Bennett, Máscara Dorada 2.0 and Wild Boar	Stevenage, Hertfordshire	Gordon Craig Theatre	

== Queen of the Ring ==
Queen of the Ring is a women's single elimination tournament produced by Revolution Pro Wrestling.

=== Dates and venues of finals ===
Year	Event	Tournament winner	Times won	Date	City	Venue	Ref.
2019	Live at the Cockpit 37	Sammii Jayne	1	January 6, 2019	London, England	Cockpit Theatre	
2019	Queen of the Ring	Maddison Miles	1	November 9, 2019	Sheffield, South Yorkshire	Corporation	
2021	Live in Huntingdon 2	Zoe Lucas	1	July 31, 2021	Huntingdon, Cambridgeshire	Commemoration Hall	

== Great British Tag League ==
Great British Tag League is a tag team round robin tournament produced by Revolution Pro Wrestling. The tournament format is modeled after New Japan Pro-Wrestling's World Tag League. The winners, if not the reigning champions, are awarded an Undisputed British Tag Team Championship title shot. And if the champions win the tournament, then they choose the challengers for their titles.

=== Dates and venues of finals ===
Year	Event	Tournament winner	Times won	Date	City	Venue	Ref.
2021	Nine Year Anniversary	Destination Anywhere (Connor Mills and Michael Oku)	1	August 21, 2021	Manchester, England	Victoria Warehouse	
2022	Summer Sizzler	The VeloCities (Jude London and Paris DeSilva)	1	July 23, 2022	Manchester, England	Victoria Warehouse	
2023	RevPro Uprising 2023	Greedy Souls (Brendan White and Danny Jones)	1	December 16, 2023	London, England	Crystal Palace National Sports Centre	
2025	13th Anniversary Show	Connor Mills and Jay Joshua	1 (2, 1)	August 23, 2025	London, England	Crystal Palace National Sports Centre	
