= British J-Cup (2022) =

2022 professional wrestling tournament by RevPro

- Promotion: Revolution Pro Wrestling
- Date: October 22, 2022
- City: Stevenage, Hertfordshire, England
- Venue: Gordon Craig Theatre

Event chronology
← Previous; Ten Year Anniversary	Next → Uprising

British J-Cup chronology
← Previous; 2021	Next → 2023

The 2022 British J-Cup was the fifth British J-Cup professional wrestling tournament produced by Revolution Pro Wrestling (RPW), which took place on October 22, 2022 at the Gordon Craig Theatre in Stevenage, Hertfordshire, England.

The tournament final was a four-way elimination match, which Robbie X won by defeating Lee Hunter, Leon Slater and Will Kaven. Apart from the tournament, The Legion (Lucian Phillips, Nathan Cruz and Yota Tsuji) defeated Eddie Dennis, Mad Kurt and Ricky Knight Jr. in a six-man tag team match, and Minoru Suzuki defeated Dan Moloney.

== Reception ==
Ian Hamilton of 411Mania rated the event 7.0, feeling that it "wasn’t a bad show - but one that seemed to lack a killer match, as more focus was put on Robbie X taking the crown after what’s felt like a year of going back-and-forth in Rev Pro."

== Aftermath ==
By winning the 2022 British J-Cup, Robbie X earned an Undisputed British Cruiserweight Championship opportunity against champion Luke Jacobs at Uprising. However, Will Kaven was added into the match due to beating Jacobs in the British J-Cup tournament, and Robbie X via count-out at Live in Sheffield. Dan Moloney was also added to the match due to his rivalry with Jacobs and a tag team match, in which Moloney and Kaven defeated Jacobs and Robbie in a tag team match at Live in London 68. Robbie defeated all three competitors in a four-way elimination match to win the British Cruiserweight Championship at Uprising.

== Results ==
No.	Results	Stipulations	Times
1	Robbie X defeated Connor Mills	2022 British J-Cup tournament first round match	12:24
2	Lee Hunter defeated Michael Oku	2022 British J-Cup tournament first round match	4:42
3	Will Kaven defeated Luke Jacobs	2022 British J-Cup tournament first round match	14:01
4	Leon Slater defeated Lio Rush	2022 British J-Cup tournament first round match	15:29
5	The Legion (Lucian Phillips, Nathan Cruz and Yota Tsuji) defeated Eddie Dennis, Mad Kurt and Ricky Knight Jr.	Six-man tag team match	19:10
6	Minoru Suzuki defeated Dan Moloney	Singles match	15:14
7	Robbie X defeated Lee Hunter, Leon Slater and Will Kaven	Four-way elimination match in the 2022 British J-Cup tournament final	19:29

=== Tournament brackets ===
First Round
Connor Mills	Pin
Robbie X	12:24
Lee Hunter	Pin
Michael Oku	4:42
Luke Jacobs	Pin
Will Kaven	14:01
Leon Slater	Pin
Lio Rush	15:29

Finalists
Robbie X
Michael Oku
Will Kaven
Leon Slater

Final
Robbie X Michael Oku	Win
Will Kaven Leon Slater	19:29
