= GWF World Cup =

Professional wrestling tournament by German Wrestling Federation

- Promotions: German Wrestling Federation
- First event: 2018
- Event gimmick: Single elimination tournament

GWF World Cup (originally GWF Light Heavyweight World Cup) is an annual professional wrestling single elimination tournament produced by German Wrestling Federation (GWF). The tournament originally featured light heavyweight wrestlers from all over the world, who represent their respective nations in the tournament. The tournament format is similar to Revolution Pro Wrestling's British J-Cup, consisting of singles matches which wrestlers win to qualify to the final, a four-way elimination match.

The first tournament was held in 2018 and has been held each year since then, with the exception of 2021, when traveling was restricted due to the COVID-19 pandemic, preventing international participation in the tournament.

== Winners, dates, venues and main events ==
| Year | Tournament winner | Times won | Date | Runners-up | City | Venue | Main event | Ref. |
|---|---|---|---|---|---|---|---|---|
| 2018 | Angélico | 1 | April 7, 2018 | Kenny Williams, Senza Volto and Tarkan Aslan | Berlin, Germany | Huxley's Neue Welt | Angélico vs. Kenny Williams vs. Senza Volto vs. Tarkan Aslan in the 2018 Light Heavyweight World Cup tournament final | |
| 2019 | El Phantasmo | 1 | March 2, 2019 | A-Kid, Angélico and Cem Kaplan | Berlin, Germany | Festsaal Kreuzberg | A-Kid vs. Angélico vs. Cem Kaplan vs. El Phantasmo in the 2019 Light Heavyweight World Cup tournament final | |
| 2020 | Tarkan Aslan | 1 | March 7, 2020 | Bence Toth BT, El Phantasmo and Senza Volto | Berlin, Germany | Festsaal Kreuzberg | Bence Toth BT vs. El Phantasmo vs. Senza Volto vs. Tarkan Aslan in the 2020 Light Heavyweight World Cup tournament final | |
| 2022 | Crowchester | 1 | March 27, 2022 | Aytac Bahar, Maverick and Michael Oku | Berlin, Germany | Festsaal Kreuzberg | Aytac Bahar vs. Crowchester vs. Maverick vs. Michael Oku in the 2022 Light Heavyweight World Cup tournament final | |
| 2023 | Aytac Bahar | 1 | March 5, 2023 | Ahura, Peter Tihanyi and Tim Stübing | Berlin, Germany | Festsaal Kreuzberg | Ahura vs. Aytac Bahar vs. Peter Tihanyi vs. Tim Stübing in the 2023 Light Heavyweight World Cup tournament final for the vacant GWF Berlin Championship | |
| 2024 | Ahura | 1 | May 18, 2024 | Aigle Blanc, Tim Stübing and Peter Tihanyi | Berlin, Germany | Astra Kulturhaus | Ahura vs. Aigle Blanc vs. Tim Stübing vs. Peter Tihanyi in the 2024 Light Heavyweight World Cup final | |
| 2025 | Axel Tischer | 1 | May 4, 2025 | Aytac Bahar, Erkan Sulcani and Robbie X | Berlin, Germany | Festsaal Kreuzberg | Axel Tischer vs. Aytac Bahar vs. Erkan Sulcani vs. Robbie X in the 2025 World Cup final | |

== Tournament history ==
=== 2018 ===
The first edition of the Light Heavyweight World Cup was held at the Huxley's Neue Welt in Berlin, Germany on April 7, 2018.

First Round
Angélico | Pin
Oliver Carter | 9:36
Jody Fleisch | Pin
Tarkan Aslan | 10:32
Kenny Williams | Pin
Kris Jokić | 6:58
Senza Volto | Pin
Tucker | 6:08

Final
Angélico | Win
Tarkan Aslan | –
Kenny Williams | –
Senza Volto | 16:55

=== 2019 ===
The second edition of the Light Heavyweight World Cup was held at Festsaal Kreuzberg in Berlin, Germany on March 2, 2019.

First Round
El Phantasmo | Win
Jonny Storm | 8:08
A-Kid | Win
Justin Wylde | 7:12
Cem Kaplan | Win
Lucky Kid | 13:23
Angélico | Win
Matt Cross | 9:02

Final
El Phantasmo | Win
A-Kid | 16:29
Cem Kaplan | –
Angélico | –

=== 2020 ===
The third edition of the Light Heavyweight World Cup was held at Festsaal Kreuzberg in Berlin, Germany on March 7, 2020.

First Round
Aytac Bahar
Tarkan Aslan
Ender Kara
Senza Volto
Bence Toth BT
Corey McRae
El Phantasmo | Win
Erik Strange | 12:37

Final
Tarkan Aslan | Win
Senza Volto | 21:54
Bence Toth BT | –
El Phantasmo | –

=== 2022 ===
The fourth edition of the Light Heavyweight World Cup was held at Festsaal Kreuzberg in Berlin, Germany on March 27, 2022.

First Round
Anarko Montana | Win
Crowchester | 10:03
Aytac Bahar | Win
Corey McRae | 12:02
Fast Time Mondo | Win
Michael Oku | 13:58
Maverick | Countout
Senza Volto | 7:12

Final
Crowchester | Win
Aytac Bahar | 28:13
Michael Oku | –
Maverick | –

=== 2023 ===
The fifth edition of the Light Heavyweight World Cup was held at Festsaal Kreuzberg in Berlin, Germany on March 5, 2023. The winner of the tournament became the new GWF Berlin Champion.

First Round
Crowchester | Pin
Tim Stübing | 12:08
Ahura | Pin
Callum Newman | 9:57
LJ Cleary | Pin
Peter Tihanyi | 10:36
Aytac Bahar | Pin
Marius Al-Ani | 13:40

Final
Tim Stübing | –
Ahura | 14:20
Peter Tihanyi | –
Aytac Bahar | Pin

=== 2024 ===
The sixth edition of the Light Heavyweight World Cup was held at the Astra Kulturhaus in Berlin, Germany on May 18, 2024.

First Round
Peter Tihanyi | Pin
Taishi Ozawa | 10:58
Aigle Blanc | Pin
Fast Time Moodo | 16:31
Tim Stübing | Pin
LJ Cleary | 12:33
Ahura | Pin
Joe Lando | 10:45

Final
Peter Tihanyi | –
Aigle Blanc | Pin
Tim Stübing | –
Ahura | 14:01

=== 2025 ===
The seventh edition of the World Cup was held at the Festsaal Kreuzberg in Berlin, Germany on May 4, 2025.

First Round
Ahura | Pin
Aytac Bahar | 9:42
Robbie X | Pin
Joe Lando | 11:34
Erkan Sulcani | Pin
Tucker | 9:24
Axel Tischer | Pin
Raj Dhesi | 10:17

Final
Aytac Bahar (Note: Bahar replaced Ahura.) | –
Robbie X | –
Erkan Sulcani | 16:20
Axel Tischer | Pin
