= British J-Cup (2023) =

2023 professional wrestling tournament by RevPro

- Promotion: Revolution Pro Wrestling
- Date: October 21, 2023
- City: Stevenage, Hertfordshire, England
- Venue: Gordon Craig Theatre

Event chronology
← Previous; Risky Business	Next → —

British J-Cup chronology
← Previous; 2022	Next → 2024

The 2023 British J-Cup was the sixth British J-Cup professional wrestling tournament produced by Revolution Pro Wrestling (RPW), which took place on October 21, 2023 at the Gordon Craig Theatre in Stevenage, Hertfordshire, England.

The tournament final was a four-way elimination match, which Leon Slater won by defeating Harrison Bennett, Mascara Dorada and Wild Boar. In other matches on the card, Michael Oku retained the British Heavyweight Championship against Gabe Kidd, Alex Windsor retained the British Women's Championship against Kanji, and Luke Jacobs defeated Ricky Knight Jr.

== Participants ==
There were eight participants in the British J-Cup, representing various international promotions from around the world.

Name:	Promotion:
Alex Zayne	New Japan Pro-Wrestling
Harrison Bennett	Revolution Pro Wrestling
Leon Slater	Revolution Pro Wrestling
Máscara Dorada 2.0	Consejo Mundial de Lucha Libre
Robbie X	Revolution Pro Wrestling
Senza Volto	Freelancer
Wild Boar	Revolution Pro Wrestling
Will Kaven	Revolution Pro Wrestling

== Reception ==
Ian Hamilton of 411Mania rated the event 7.7, considering it "a show of two halves", with the first half being "a “foam finger” show for the casuals" and the second half being "a York Hall-like outing".

== Aftermath ==
Shortly after winning the British J-Cup, Leon Slater achieved more success as Total Nonstop Action Wrestling signed him to a full-time contract during the UK Invasion Tour in October.

== Results ==
No.	Results	Stipulations	Times
1	Leon Slater defeated Will Kaven	2023 British J-Cup tournament first round match	14:09
2	Wild Boar defeated Alex Zayne	2023 British J-Cup tournament first round match	12:56
3	Harrison Bennett defeated Senza Volto	2023 British J-Cup tournament first round match	16:04
4	Mascara Dorada defeated Robbie X	2023 British J-Cup tournament first round match	9:17
5	Alex Windsor (c) defeated Kanji	Singles match for the British Women's Championship	17:57
6	Luke Jacobs defeated Ricky Knight Jr.	Singles match	17:37
7	Michael Oku (c) defeated Gabe Kidd	Singles match for the British Heavyweight Championship	18:21
8	Leon Slater defeated Harrison Bennett, Mascara Dorada and Wild Boar	Four-way elimination match in the 2023 British J-Cup tournament final	20:31
(c) / – the champion(s) heading into the match

=== Tournament brackets ===
British J-Cup (2023)
- Venue: Gordon Craig Theatre
- Location: Stevenage, Hertfordshire, England
- Date: October 21, 2023

Champion
- Leon Slater

First Round
Leon Slater	Pin
Will Kaven	14:09
Alex Zayne	Pin
Wild Boar	12:56
Harrison Bennett	Pin
Senza Volto	16:04
Mascara Dorada	Pin
Robbie X	9:17

Final
Leon Slater	Win
Wild Boar	20:31
Harrison Bennett	–
Mascara Dorada	–
