= British J-Cup (2024) =

2024 professional wrestling tournament by RevPro

- Official artwork of the event's logo
- Promotion: Revolution Pro Wrestling
- Date: September 28, 2024
- City: Stevenage, Hertfordshire, England
- Venue: Gordon Craig Theatre

Event chronology
← Previous; RevPro Live In London 88	Next → Global Wars UK 2024

British J-Cup chronology
← Previous; 2023	Next → 2025

The 2024 British J-Cup was the sixth British J-Cup professional wrestling tournament produced by Revolution Pro Wrestling (RPW), which took place on September 28, 2024 at the Gordon Craig Theatre in Stevenage, Hertfordshire, England.

The tournament final was a four-way elimination match, which Lio Rush won by defeating Cameron Khai, Dante Martin and Kid Lykos II. In other matches on the card, Zozaya defeated JJ Gale in singles competition and Undisputed British Heavyweight Champion Luke Jacobs defeated 1 Called Manders in a non-title bout.

== Participants ==
There were eight participants in the British J-Cup, representing various international promotions from around the world.

Name:	Promotion:
Barbaro Cavernario	Consejo Mundial de Lucha Libre
Cameron Khai	Revolution Pro Wrestling
Dante Martin	All Elite Wrestling
Kid Lykos	Freelancer; Progress Wrestling
Kid Lykos II	Freelancer; Progress Wrestling
Lio Rush	Freelancer
Robbie Eagles	New Japan Pro Wrestling
Robbie X	Freelancer

== Results ==
No.	Results	Stipulations	Times
1	Lio Rush defeated Bárbaro Cavernario by pinfall	2024 British J-Cup tournament first round match	11:02
2	Kid Lykos defeated Kid Lykos II by pinfall	2024 British J-Cup tournament first round match	15:19
3	Cameron Khai defeated Robbie Eagles by pinfall	2024 British J-Cup tournament first round match	17:40
4	Dante Martin defeated Robbie X by pinfall	2024 British J-Cup tournament first round match	16:25
5	Zozaya defeated JJ Gale by pinfall	Singles match	15:23
6	Luke Jacobs defeated 1 Called Manders by pinfall	Singles match	12:18
7	Lio Rush defeated Cameron Khai, Dante Martin and Kid Lykos II by pinfall	Four-way elimination match in the 2024 British J-Cup tournament final	18:01

=== Tournament brackets ===
British J-Cup (2024)
- Venue: Gordon Craig Theatre
- Location: Stevenage, Hertfordshire, England
- Date: September 28, 2024

Champion
- Lio Rush

First Round
Lio Rush	Pin
Barbaro Cavernario	11:02
Kid Lykos	Pin
Kid Lykos II	15:19
Cameron Khai	Pin
Robbie Eagles	17:40
Dante Martin	Pin
Robbie X	16:25

Final
Lio Rush	Pin
Cameron Khai	18:01
Dante Martin	–
Kid Lykos II	–
