= High Stakes (2021) =

High Stakes 2021
- Promotion: Revolution Pro Wrestling
- Date: September 19, 2021
- City: Bethnal Green, London, England
- Venue: York Hall
- Attendance: 1,000

High Stakes chronology
← Previous; 2020	Next → 2022

High Stakes 2021 was a professional wrestling event produced by Revolution Pro Wrestling that took place on September 19, 2021, in Bethnal Green, London, England.

== Storylines ==
The event featured eleven professional wrestling matches that involve different wrestlers from pre-existing scripted feuds and storylines. Wrestlers portray heroes, villains, or less distinguishable characters in scripted events that build tension and culminate in a wrestling match or series of matches. Storylines are produced on RevPro's weekly tour-based shows.

== Results ==
No.	Results	Stipulations	Times
1	The Young Guns (Ethan Allen and Luke Jacobs) defeated Sunhsine Machine (Chuck Mambo and TK Cooper) and Two Extremely Athletic Men (Kenneth Halfpenny and Shaun Jackson) and Brendan White and Doug Williams	Fatal Four Way Tag Team Match	11:40
2	Shota Umino defeated Drilla Moloney	Singles match	14:17
3	Michael Oku (c) defeated Robbie X and Chris Ridgeway	Three-way match for the Undisputed British Cruiserweight Championship	12:37
4	Yota Tsuji defeated Mark Haskins	Singles match	21:45
5	Gisele Shaw (c) defeated Hyan	Best Two Out Of Three Falls Singles match for the Undisputed British Women's Championship	19:02
6	Aussie Open (Kyle Fletcher and Mark Davis) defeated Destination Everywhere (Michael Oku and Connor Mills) (c)	Tag team match for the Undisputed British Tag Team Championship	27:38
7	Will Ospreay (c) defeated Ricky Knight Jr.	Singles match for the Undisputed British Heavyweight Championship	32:30
(c) / – the champion(s) heading into the match

== See also ==
- 2021 in professional wrestling
