= British J-Cup (2021) =

2021 professional wrestling tournament by RevPro

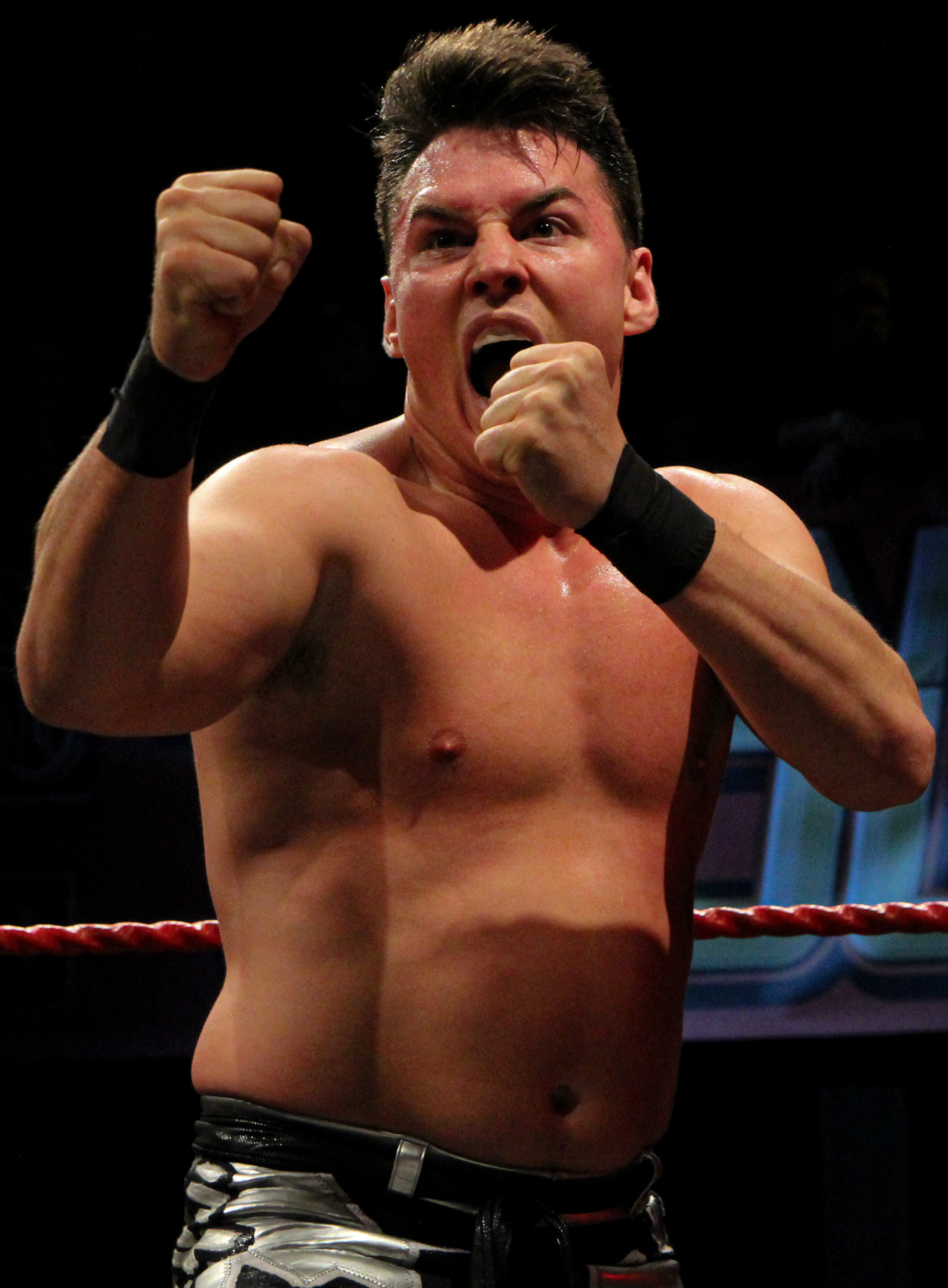
- 2021 tournament winner Mike Bailey
- Promotion: Revolution Pro Wrestling
- Date: November 6, 2021
- City: Stevenage, Hertfordshire, England
- Venue: Gordon Craig Theatre

Event chronology
← Previous; Unfinished Business	Next → Uprising

British J-Cup chronology
← Previous; 2019	Next → 2022

The 2021 British J-Cup was the fourth British J-Cup professional wrestling tournament produced by Revolution Pro Wrestling (RPW), which took place on November 6, 2021 at the Gordon Craig Theatre in Stevenage, Hertfordshire, England.

The tournament final was a four-way elimination match, which Mike Bailey won by defeating Michael Oku, Connor Mills and Luke Jacobs. Apart from the tournament, United Empire (Kyle Fletcher, Mark Davis and Will Ospreay) defeated Ricky Knight Jr. and Sunshine Machine (Chuck Mambo and TK Cooper) in a six-man tag team match, and Yota Tsuji defeated Big Damo.

== Production ==
=== Background ===
On September 25, 2021, RPW announced on its official Twitter account that the British J-Cup would return after a two-year hiatus, being held at the November 6, 2021 at the Gordon Craig Theatre in Stevenage, Hertfordshire, England. The British J-Cup was last held in 2019, and there was no tournament in 2020 due to the COVID-19 pandemic.

=== Qualification ===
The qualifying matches for British J-Cup were held at Unfinished Business on September 26, 2021 at Priory Center in St Neots, Cambridgeshire.

No.	Results	Stipulations	Times
1	Connor Mills defeated Callum Newman	British J-Cup qualifying match	13:41
2	Robbie X defeated Martin Kirby	British J-Cup qualifying match	12:40

== Reception ==
Ian Hamilton of 411Mania praised the event, scoring it 8.0. According to him, it was "A largely stand-alone show". He stated that "the 2021 British J-Cup more than delivered in the tournament format - while the pair of non-tournament matches on show provided plenty of spectacle as well."

== Aftermath ==
By winning the British J-Cup, Mike Bailey earned a British Cruiserweight Championship match against Michael Oku at Uprising, which Bailey lost.

== Results ==
No.	Results	Stipulations	Times
1	Michael Oku defeated LJ Cleary	2021 British J-Cup tournament first round match	13:12
2	Connor Mills defeated JJ Gale	2021 British J-Cup tournament first round match	9:10
3	Luke Jacobs defeated Robbie X	2021 British J-Cup tournament first round match	12:01
4	Mike Bailey defeated Kid Lykos	2021 British J-Cup tournament first round match	12:02
5	Yota Tsuji defeated Big Damo (with Gideon Grey)	Singles match	10:36
6	United Empire (Kyle Fletcher, Mark Davis and Will Ospreay) defeated Ricky Knight Jr. and Sunshine Machine (Chuck Mambo and TK Cooper)	Six-man tag team match	18:13
7	Mike Bailey defeated Connor Mills, Luke Jacobs and Michael Oku	Four-way elimination match in the 2021 British J-Cup tournament final	32:28

=== Tournament brackets ===
The tournament brackets for the British J-Cup were as follows:

First Round
LJ Cleary	Sub
Michael Oku	13:12
Connor Mills	Pin
JJ Gale	9:10
Luke Jacobs	Pin
Robbie X	12:01
Kid Lykos	Pin
Mike Bailey	12:02

Finalists
Michael Oku
Connor Mills
Luke Jacobs
Mike Bailey

Final
Michael Oku Connor Mills	Win
Luke Jacobs Mike Bailey	32:28
