= British J-Cup (2025) =

2025 professional wrestling tournament by RevPro

- Official artwork of the event's logo
- Promotion: Revolution Pro Wrestling
- Date: June 14, 2025
- City: Stevenage, Hertfordshire, England
- Venue: Gordon Craig Theatre

Event chronology
← Previous; RevPro Live In Southampton 36	Next → RevPro Revolution Rumble 2025

British J-Cup chronology
← Previous; 2024	Next → —

The 2025 British J-Cup was the seventh British J-Cup professional wrestling tournament produced by Revolution Pro Wrestling (RPW), which took place on June 14, 2025 at the Gordon Craig Theatre in Stevenage, Hertfordshire, England.

The tournament final was a four-way elimination match, which Nino Bryant won by defeating Adam Priest, Cameron Khai and Chris Ridgeway. In other matches on the card, TK Cooper defeated Luke Jacobs and Serena Deeb defeated Lizzy Evo in singles competition.

== Participants ==
There were eight participants in the British J-Cup, representing various international promotions from around the world.

Name:	Promotion:
Ace Austin	Freelancer
Adam Priest	Deadlock Pro-Wrestling
Cameron Khai	Revolution Pro Wrestling
Chris Ridgeway	Revolution Pro Wrestling
Ender Kara	Freelancer
Ethan Allen	Revolution Pro Wrestling
Kid Lykos II	Progress Wrestling
Nino Bryant	Freelancer

== Results ==
No.	Results	Stipulations	Times
1	Chris Ridgeway defeated Ender Kara	2025 British J-Cup tournament first round match	12:05
2	Nino Bryant defeated Ethan Allen	2025 British J-Cup tournament first round match	12:00
3	Adam Priest defeated Kid Lykos II	2025 British J-Cup tournament first round match	14:28
4	Cameron Khai defeated Ace Austin	2025 British J-Cup tournament first round match	16:21
5	TK Cooper defeated Luke Jacobs	Singles match	12:42
6	Serena Deeb defeated Lizzy Evo	Singles match	11:50
7	Nino Bryant defeated Adam Priest, Cameron Khai and Chris Ridgeway	Four-way elimination match in the 2025 British J-Cup tournament final	17:35

=== Tournament brackets ===
British J-Cup (2025)
- Venue: Gordon Craig Theatre
- Location: Stevenage, Hertfordshire, England
- Date: September 28, 2024

Champion
- Nino Bryant

First Round
Nino Bryant	Pin
Ethan Allen	12:00
Adam Priest	Pin
Kid Lykos II	14:28
Cameron Khai	Pin
Ace Austin	16:21
Chris Ridgeway	Pin
Ender Kara	12:05

Final
Nino Bryant	Pin
Adam Priest	17:35
Cameron Khai	–
Chris Ridgeway	–
