= British J-Cup =

Professional wrestling tournament by RevPro

- Promotions: Revolution Pro Wrestling
- First event: 2017
- Event gimmick: Single elimination tournament for junior heavyweight wrestlers

British J-Cup is a professional wrestling single elimination tournament produced by Revolution Pro Wrestling (RPW). The tournament features junior heavyweight wrestlers from all over the world. It consists of singles matches which wrestlers win to qualify to the final, a four-way elimination match. The winner of the tournament, if not the reigning champion, is awarded a title shot for the Undisputed British Cruiserweight Championship.

The tournament was created in 2017, modeled after the popular cruiserweight tournament Super J-Cup. Jushin Liger, the innovator of the original Super J-Cup was announced as the first participant of the British J-Cup and went on to win the first edition of the tournament. British J-Cup is held annually by RevPro, with the exception of 2020.

== History ==
The first British J-Cup was held in 2017, modeled after the Super J-Cup. The tournament featured eight participants who competed in singles matches and won to qualify for a four-way elimination match in the final round. The innovator of the original Super J-Cup, Jushin Liger won the inaugural tournament. The following year, British J-Cup became an annual staple of RPW, and expanded to sixteen participants. They competed in singles matches in the opening round and then the four participants won the semifinal matches to qualify for the final. In 2019, the number of participants was reverted to eight.

In 2020, the tournament did not take place due to travel restrictions occurring during the COVID-19 pandemic. The tournament returned to 2021 at the Gordon Craig Theatre in Stevenage, Hertfordshire, England. The following two editions of the British J-Cup have been held at the same venue.

== Winners, dates, venues and main events ==
Year	Tournament winner	Times won	Date	Runners-up	City	Venue	Main event	Ref.
2017	Jushin Liger	1	July 8, 2017	Kushida, Marty Scurll and Will Ospreay	London, England	Walthamstow Assembly Hall	Jushin Liger vs. Kushida vs. Marty Scurll vs. Will Ospreay in the 2017 British J-Cup tournament final	
2018	El Phantasmo	1	September 8, 2018	Kushida, Rich Swann and Rocky Romero	Manchester, England	Bowlers Exhibition Centre	CCK (Chris Brookes and Jonathan Gresham) vs. Ringkampf (Timothy Thatcher and Walter)	
2018	El Phantasmo	1	September 9, 2018	Kushida, Rich Swann and Rocky Romero	Manchester, England	Bowlers Exhibition Centre	El Phantasmo vs. Kushida vs. Rich Swann vs. Rocky Romero in the 2018 British J-Cup tournament final	
2019	Michael Oku	1	November 24, 2019	El Phantasmo, Pac and Robbie Eagles	London, England	York Hall	El Phantasmo vs. Michael Oku vs. Pac vs. Robbie Eagles in the 2019 British J-Cup tournament final	
2021	Mike Bailey	1	November 6, 2021	Connor Mills, Luke Jacobs and Michael Oku	Stevenage, Hertfordshire	Gordon Craig Theatre	Connor Mills vs. Luke Jacobs vs. Michael Oku vs. Mike Bailey in the 2021 British J-Cup tournament final	
2022	Robbie X	1	October 22, 2022	Lee Hunter, Leon Slater and Will Kaven	Stevenage, Hertfordshire	Gordon Craig Theatre	Lee Hunter vs. Leon Slater vs. Robbie X vs. Will Kaven in the 2022 British J-Cup tournament final	
2023	Leon Slater	1	October 21, 2023	Harrison Bennett, Mascara Dorada and Wild Boar	Stevenage, Hertfordshire	Gordon Craig Theatre	Harrison Bennett vs. Leon Slater vs. Mascara Dorada vs. Wild Boar in the 2023 British J-Cup tournament final	
2024	Lio Rush	1	September 28, 2024	Cameron Khai, Dante Martin and Kid Lykos II	Stevenage, Hertfordshire	Gordon Craig Theatre	Lio Rush vs. Cameron Khai vs. Dante Martin vs. Kid Lykos II in the 2024 British J-Cup tournament final	
2025	Nino Bryant	1	June 14, 2025	Adam Priest, Cameron Khai and Chris Ridgeway	Stevenage, Hertfordshire	Gordon Craig Theatre	Nino Bryant vs. Adam Priest vs. Cameron Khai vs. Chris Ridgeway in the 2025 British J-Cup tournament final	
2026	Nino Bryant	2	June 27, 2026	Leon Cage, Robbie X, and Will Kraven	Stevenage, Hertfordshire	Gordon Craig Theatre	Nino Bryant vs. Leon Cage vs. Robbie X vs. Will Kraven in the 2026 British J-Cup tournament final	

=== Championship match for winner ===
– Championship victory
– Championship match loss

#	Winner	Event	Year	Championship match
1	Jushin Liger	Summer Sizzler	2017	Liger lost to Josh Bodom for the Undisputed British Cruiserweight Championship.
2	El Phantasmo	Live At The Cockpit 35	2018	Phantasmo lost to David Starr for the Undisputed British Cruiserweight Championship.
3	Michael Oku	High Stakes	2020	Oku defeated El Phantasmo to win the Undisputed British Cruiserweight Championship.
4	Mike Bailey	Uprising	2021	Bailey lost to Michael Oku for the Undisputed British Cruiserweight Championship.
5	Robbie X	Uprising	2022	Robbie defeated reigning champion Luke Jacobs, Dan Moloney and Will Kaven in a four-way elimination match to win the Undisputed British Cruiserweight Championship.
6	Leon Slater	Uprising	2023	Slater defeated Connor Mills to win the Undisputed British Cruiserweight Championship.
7	Lio Rush	High Stakes	2025	Rush lost to Will Kaven for the Undisputed British Cruiserweight Championship.
8	Nino Bryant	Revolution Rumble	2025	Nino Bryant defeated Will Kaven for the Undisputed British Cruiserweight Championship.

== See also ==
- Super J-Cup
