= British J-Cup (2017) =

2017 professional wrestling tournament by RevPro

- Promotional poster
- Promotion: Revolution Pro Wrestling
- Date: July 8, 2017
- City: London, England
- Venue: Walthamstow Assembly Hall

Event chronology
← Previous; Epic Encounter	Next → Summer Sizzler

British J-Cup chronology
← Previous; First	Next → 2018

The 2017 British J-Cup was the inaugural British J-Cup professional wrestling tournament produced by Revolution Pro Wrestling (RPW). It took place on July 8, 2017 at the Walthamstow Assembly Hall in London, England.

It was an eight-man tournament, in which four competitors won their respective singles matches and reached the final round, a four-way elimination match, which Jushin Liger won.

== Production ==
=== Background ===
On April 24, 2017, Revolution Pro Wrestling announced on Twitter that it would be holding the first-ever British J-Cup for cruiserweights on July 8, 2017. The event was modeled after the popular Super J-Cup tournament in Japan.

=== Participants ===
British J-Cup featured eight participants including wrestlers from Revolution Pro Wrestling and its partner promotions Ring of Honor and New Japan Pro-Wrestling.

Name:	Promotion:	Championship held:
Jushin "Thunder" Liger	New Japan Pro-Wrestling	–
Josh Bodom	Revolution Pro Wrestling	Undisputed British Cruiserweight Championship
Kushida	New Japan Pro-Wrestling	IWGP Junior Heavyweight Championship; ROH World Television Championship
Kyle O'Reilly	Ring of Honor	–
Marty Scurll	Ring of Honor	–
Ryusuke Taguchi	New Japan Pro-Wrestling	–
Tiger Mask	New Japan Pro-Wrestling	–
Will Ospreay	Revolution Pro Wrestling	–

== Event ==
=== First round ===
The British J-Cup tournament kicked off with a match between Marty Scurll and Tiger Mask. Mask countered a crossface chickenwing by Scurll but Scurll broke his fingers and pinned him with a Mouse Trap for the win.

Next, the Undisputed British Cruiserweight Champion Josh Bodom took on Jushin Liger in a non-title match. Earlier into the match, Liger delivered a superplex, a Shotei and a Liger Bomb to Bodom for a near-fall. Liger would then deliver a brainbuster to Bodom for the win. However, Bodom protested after the loss saying that it was only a two-count and confronted the referee Chris Roberts and RPW owner Andy Quildan before leaving the ring.

Next, Kushida took on Kyle O'Reilly. Kushida countered a knee strike by O'Reilly into a Back to the Future for the win.

This was followed by the final match in the first round of the British J-Cup, in which Ryusuke Taguchi took on Will Ospreay. Ospreay got a near-fall by delivering a Spanish Fly to Taguchi and followed that with an OsCutter to Taguchi for the win.

=== Non-tournament matches ===
Next, a tag team match took place pitting The Young Contenders (Josh Wall and Kurtis Chapman) against The Tempura Boyz (Sho Tanaka and Yohei Komatsu). Tanaka delivered a Shock Arrow to Chapman for the win.

Later, CCK (Chris Brookes and Travis Banks) took on Los Ingobernables de Japon (Bushi and Hiromu Takahashi). CCK delivered an aided snap swinging neckbreaker to Takahashi and attempted to pin him but Bushi broke up the pin. Takahashi then delivered a low blow to Banks and Bushi sprayed a mist to Banks, causing LIJ to get disqualified. LIJ continued to attack CCK after the match until CCK member Kid Lykos made the save forcing LIJ to retreat.

It was followed by the penultimate match, in which Matt Riddle took on Tomohiro Ishii. Riddle got a near-fall after a fisherman buster and then Ishii delivered a brainbuster to Riddle for the win.

=== Final ===
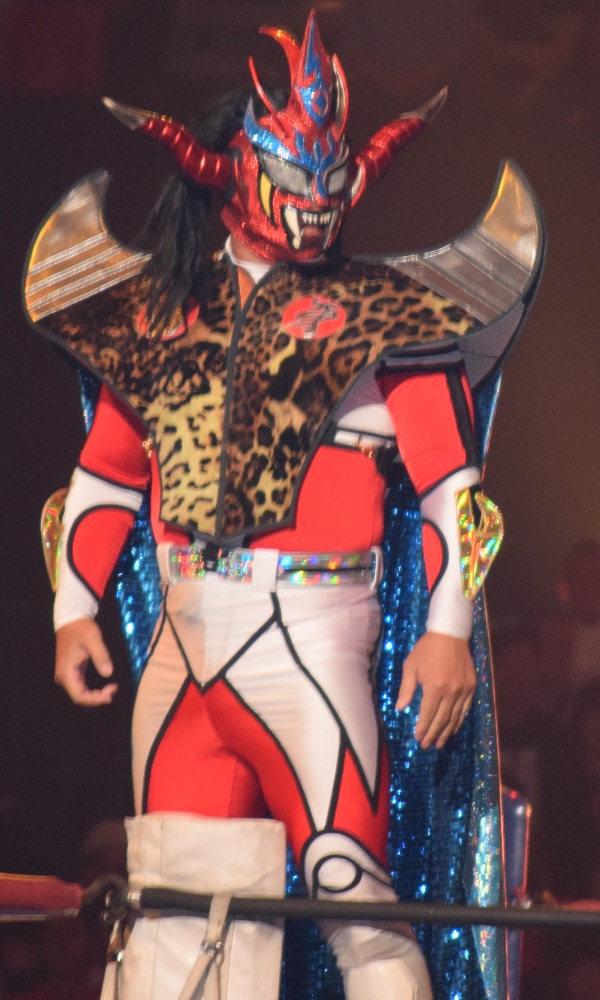
The 2017 tournament winner Jushin "Thunder" Liger.

The British J-Cup tournament final was a four-way elimination match between Jushin Liger, Kushida, Marty Scurll and Will Ospreay, which headlined the event. Kushida was the first person to be eliminated after Ospreay delivered an OsCutter to Kushida but Scurll tossed Ospreay out of the ring and pinned Kushida with a Mouse Trap. Scurll and Ospreay would then fight for the next eleven minutes while Liger was knocked out whenever he tried to get up and remained outside of the ring for most of the time. Scurll tried to use an umbrella to hit his opponents after shoving Ospreay into the referee while Ospreay tried to deliver an OsCutter to Scurll. Ospreay avoided an umbrella swing by Scurll and tried to hit Scurll with it but Scurll avoided it and Liger was mistakenly hit instead, allowing Scurll to pin Ospreay with a Mouse Trap for the elimination. Scurll tried to apply a crossface chickenwing on Liger after a superkick but Liger countered it and delivered a brainbuster to Scurll to win the inaugural British J-Cup tournament.

After the match, Marty Jones presented Liger with the British J-Cup trophy but Josh Bodom confronted them and attacked Liger due to his protest. Jones confronted Bodom and brawled with him but Bodom attacked him as well which led RPW locker room to make the save and force Bodom to retreat. RPW owner Andy Quildan then announced that Bodom would defend the Undisputed British Cruiserweight Championship against Liger at Summer Sizzler.

== Reception ==
British J-Cup was made available for purchase on Revolution Pro Wrestling's RevPro On Demand online streaming service on July 10, 2017. The event was also released on DVD. Upon release, the event received unanimous reviews from wrestling critics.

Oliver Court of Voices of Wrestling stated that the British J-Cup "was greater than the sum of its parts, thanks to a (Jushin) Liger-focussed tournament story that paid off in a very feel-good way, along with bonus matches that complemented the tournament very well. (Tomohiro) Ishii/(Matt) Riddle is must-see, KUSHIDA/(Kyle) O’Reilly added to their already-great rivalry, and Liger’s dream run was a lovely moment."

Kevin Pantoja of 411Mania rated it a score of 7.0. He felt that the event featured "strong matches" and the contest between Matt Riddle and Tomohiro Ishii was "a damn good match". He further stated that "The finals delivered, while it was cool to see the Tempura Boyz and the BUSHI/Hiromu tandem."

Brian Bayless of Blog of Doom praised the event by stating that it "had two excellent matches and a great end to the tournament." According to him, "A few of the matches were disappointing but the top matches are worth going out of your way to see."

== Aftermath ==
Jushin Liger received his Undisputed British Cruiserweight Championship opportunity against Josh Bodom at Summer Sizzler, where Bodom won to retain the title.

== Results ==
No.	Results	Stipulations	Times
1	Marty Scurll defeated Tiger Mask	2017 British J-Cup tournament first round	11:56
2	Jushin Liger defeated Josh Bodom	2017 British J-Cup tournament first round	2:21
3	Kushida defeated Kyle O'Reilly	2017 British J-Cup tournament first round	21:27
4	Will Ospreay defeated Ryusuke Taguchi	2017 British J-Cup tournament first round	13:26
5	The Tempura Boyz (Sho Tanaka and Yohei Komatsu) defeated The Young Contenders (Josh Wall and Kurtis Chapman)	Tag team match	9:33
6	CCK (Chris Brookes and Travis Banks) defeated Los Ingobernables de Japon (Bushi and Hiromu Takahashi) by disqualification	Tag team match	8:30
7	Tomohiro Ishii defeated Matt Riddle	Singles match	11:47
8	Jushin Liger defeated Kushida, Marty Scurll and Will Ospreay	Four-way elimination match in the 2017 British J-Cup tournament final	23:00

=== Tournament brackets ===
British J-Cup (2017)
- Venue: Walthamstow Assembly Hall
- Location: London, England
- Date: July 8, 2017

Champion
- Jushin Thunder Liger

First Round
Marty Scurll	Pin
Tiger Mask	11:56
Josh Bodom	Pin
Jushin Liger	2:21
Kushida	Pin
Kyle O'Reilly	21:27
Ryusuke Taguchi	Pin
Will Ospreay	13:26

Final
Marty Scurll	23:00
Jushin Liger	Win
Kushida	–
Will Ospreay	–
