= British J-Cup (2019) =

2019 professional wrestling tournament by RevPro

- Promotion: Revolution Pro Wrestling
- Date: November 24, 2019
- City: London, England
- Venue: York Hall

Event chronology
← Previous; New Beginnings	Next → Uprising

British J-Cup chronology
← Previous; 2018	Next → 2021

The 2019 British J-Cup was the third British J-Cup professional wrestling tournament produced by Revolution Pro Wrestling (RPW), which took place on November 24, 2019 at the York Hall in London, England.

The tournament final was a four-way elimination match, which Michael Oku won by defeating El Phantasmo, Pac and Robbie Eagles. Aside from the British J-Cup tournament, the event featured various non-tournament matches on the undercard including a championship unification match, in which the British Tag Team Champions The Legion (Rampage Brown and The Great-O-Kharn) defeated the SWE Tag Team Champions Moonlight Express (Mao and Mike Bailey) to unify the British Tag Team Championship and the SWE Tag Team Championship.

== Production ==
=== Background ===
On September 18, 2019, it was announced on RPW's official Twitter account that the third edition of British J-Cup would be held on November 24, 2019 at the York Hall in London, England.

=== Storylines ===
==== Tournament line-up ====
The participants announced for the tournament were:

Name:	Promotion:	Championship held:
Amazing Red	House of Glory	–
Bárbaro Cavernario	Consejo Mundial de Lucha Libre	–
El Phantasmo	Revolution Pro Wrestling	Undisputed British Cruiserweight Championship
Michael Oku	Revolution Pro Wrestling	–
Robbie Eagles	New Japan Pro-Wrestling	–
Rocky Romero	New Japan Pro-Wrestling	–
Pac	All Elite Wrestling	–
Senza Volto	Freelancer	–

==== Non-tournament matches ====
At Live in Southampton 10, Brendan White defeated JJ Gale, Kenneth Halfpenny and Shaun Jackson in a four-way match to earn the right to face Ren Narita in a match at British J-Cup.

On September 19, 2019, RPW announced on its website that it would purchase Southside Wrestling Entertainment on October 28 and SWE champions would bring their titles to RevPro. Championship unification matches would take place to unify the SWE titles into RPW titles. Deadly Sins (JK Moody and Kane Khan) brought the SWE Tag Team Championship to RPW, losing the titles to Moonlight Express (Mao and Mike Bailey) at Live at the Cockpit 47. This set up a title unification match between Moonlight Express and The Legion (Rampage Brown and The Great-O-Kharn) for Moonlight Express' SWE Tag Team Championship and Legion's Undisputed British Tag Team Championship at British J-Cup.

== Event ==
=== First Round ===
The first round of the British J-Cup started with a match between the Undisputed British Cruiserweight Champion El Phantasmo and Senza Volto. Hikuleo interfered in the match by pulling the referee out of the ring at a two-count while Volto had covered Phantasmo for the pinfall after hitting a moonsault side slam. The referee was distracted by arguing with Hikuleo, allowing Phantasmo to deliver a low blow to Volto and pin him with a roll-up for the win. Phantasmo and Hikuleo attacked Volto after the match until Shota Umino made the save.

Next, El Barbaro Cavernario made his RPW debut against Robbie Eagles. Eagles avoided a senton bomb by Cavernario. Eagles hit a series of kicks and a running meteora, followed by a 450° splash on the knee and then he applied a Ron Miller Special on Cavernario to win via submission.

Next, Rocky Romero took on Michael Oku. Both men delivered a series of signature moves until Romero applied a Diablo Armbar on Romero Oku countered it into a roll-up for the win.

After that, Amazing Red took on Pac. Red tried to deliver a top-rope Code Red to Pac but Pac was able to jump and land on his feet. Red countered a powerbomb by Pac into a Code Red but got a near-fall. Red walked the ropes to deliver an aerial move but Pac kicked the ropes and delivered a brainbuster to Red. Pac then performed a Black Arrow on Red's back and applied a Brutalizer on Red to win via submission.

=== Non-tournament matches ===
The first non-tournament match took place between Brendan White and Ren Narita. Narita applied a Narita Special #3 on White to make him submit for the win.

Next, a championship unification match took place between The Legion (Rampage Brown and The Great-O-Kharn) and Moonlight Express (Mao and Mike Bailey) for Moonlight Express' SWE Tag Team Championship and Legion's Undisputed British Tag Team Championship. Moonlight Express got a near-fall on Brown after delivering an Ultima Weapon and a moonsault combination. Moonlight Express attempted to deliver that combination again but Brown delivered a lariat to Mao. Legion delivered a death drop to Mao and then Brown delivered a piledriver to Mao for the win to unify the SWE Tag Team Championship into the British Tag Team Championship. Gideon Grey cut a promo after the match, saying that no one could beat Legion for the titles until Kings of the North (Bonesaw and Damien Corvin) made their RPW debut and attacked Legion.

After the match, a vignette aired in which Kurtis Chapman challenged Minoru Suzuki to a match at Uprising.

It was followed by the penultimate match, in which Tessa Blanchard took on Gisele Shaw. Shaw delivered a knee strike and a DDT to Blanchard and then applied a short armbar to Blanchard to make her submit for the win.

=== Final ===
The British J-Cup tournament final was a four-way elimination match, in which El Phantasmo took on Michael Oku, Pac and Robbie Eagles. Pac was the first competitor to be eliminated as he was disqualified for hitting Oku with a chair. Pac continued to hit Oku with more chair shots before leaving. After that, the next elimination occurred when Eagles had covered Phantasmo after a DDT but the referee was distracted, allowing Phantasmo to deliver a low blow to Eagles and pin him with a roll-up. After hitting a frog splash, Oku applied a half crab on Phantasmo to make him submit to the hold. Oku then lifted the British J-Cup trophy and celebrated the win with his family until Pac attacked him and destroyed the trophy.

== Reception ==
Larry Csonka of 411Mania praised the event, rating it 7.0. He considered a "good" event, stating that Amazing Red and Pac stole "the show with ease" but the tournament final was "really flat".

== Aftermath ==
The confrontation between Shota Umino and Hikuleo at British J-Cup led to a match between the two at Uprising, which Umino won.

Kings of North's attack and brawl with The Legion at British J-Cup led to both teams facing each other in a match for Legion's British Tag Team Championship at Uprising, which Legion retained.

Pac's attack on Michael Oku after the British J-Cup final led to Oku vowing revenge on Pac, facing him in a match at Uprising, which Oku won. Oku then received his British Cruiserweight Championship opportunity on winning the British J-Cup against El Phantasmo at High Stakes. Oku defeated Phantasmo to win the title.

== Results ==
No.	Results	Stipulations	Times
1	El Phantasmo (with Hikuleo) defeated Senza Volto	2019 British J-Cup tournament first round match	14:47
2	Robbie Eagles defeated El Barbaro Cavernario	2019 British J-Cup tournament first round match	17:28
3	Michael Oku defeated Rocky Romero	2019 British J-Cup tournament first round match	14:38
4	Pac defeated Amazing Red	2019 British J-Cup tournament first round match	17:29
5	Ren Narita defeated Brendan White	Singles match	9:30
6	The Legion (Rampage Brown and The Great-O-Kharn) (British Tag Team Champions) (with Gideon Grey and Sha Samuels) defeated Moonlight Express (Mao and Mike Bailey) (SWE Tag Team Champions)	Tag team match to unify the SWE Tag Team Championship and the Undisputed British Tag Team Championship	19:51
7	Gisele Shaw defeated Tessa Blanchard	Singles match	15:16
8	Michael Oku defeated El Phantasmo, Pac and Robbie Eagles	Four-way elimination match in the 2019 British J-Cup tournament final	28:18

=== Tournament brackets ===
First Round
El Phantasmo	Pin
Senza Volto	14:47
Bárbaro Cavernario	Sub
Robbie Eagles	17:28
Michael Oku	Pin
Rocky Romero	14:38
Amazing Red	Sub
Pac	17:29

Finalists
El Phantasmo
Robbie Eagles
Michael Oku
Pac

Final
El Phantasmo Robbie Eagles	Win
Michael Oku Pac	28:18
