= British J-Cup (2018) =

2018 professional wrestling tournament by RevPro

- Promotional poster
- Promotion: Revolution Pro Wrestling
- Date: Night One: September 8, 2018; Night Two: September 9, 2018
- City: Manchester, England
- Venue: Bowlers Exhibition Centre

Event chronology
← Previous; Brawl At The Guildhall	Next → Global Wars

British J-Cup chronology
← Previous; 2017	Next → 2019

The 2018 British J-Cup was the second British J-Cup professional wrestling tournament produced by Revolution Pro Wrestling (RPW). It was a two-night event, which took place on September 8, 2018 and September 9, 2018 at the Bowlers Exhibition Centre in Manchester, England.

It was a sixteen-man tournament where competitors competed in singles matches during the first two rounds and the tournament final was a four-way elimination match. El Phantasmo won the tournament by defeating Kushida, Rich Swann and Rocky Romero in the final.

== Participants ==
=== Original lineup ===
Along with Revolution Pro Wrestling, the tournament featured participants from various promotions such as The Crash, Impact Wrestling and New Japan Pro-Wrestling.

Name:	Promotion:	Championship held:
Bandido	The Crash	Crash Cruiserweight Championship; Crash Tag Team Championship; Progress Tag Team Championship
Chris Ridgeway	Revolution Pro Wrestling	–
David Starr	Revolution Pro Wrestling	Undisputed British Cruiserweight Championship
Dean Allmark	Preston City Wrestling	–
El Phantasmo	Revolution Pro Wrestling	–
Flamita	The Crash	Crash Tag Team Championship; Progress Tag Team Championship
Jushin Liger	New Japan Pro-Wrestling	–
Kurtis Chapman	Revolution Pro Wrestling	–
Kyle Fletcher	Revolution Pro Wrestling	–
Mark Davis	Revolution Pro Wrestling	–
Rich Swann	Impact Wrestling	–
Rocky Romero	New Japan Pro-Wrestling	–
Ryusuke Taguchi	New Japan Pro-Wrestling	–
Sho	New Japan Pro-Wrestling	–
Tiger Mask	New Japan Pro-Wrestling	–
Yoh	New Japan Pro-Wrestling	–

=== Replacement ===
Kurtis Chapman suffered an injury, forcing him to withdraw from the tournament and Kip Sabian replaced him in the tournament.

== Event ==
=== Night 1 ===
The 2018 British J-Cup started with a match between Jushin Liger and Kyle Fletcher. After avoiding a moonsault by Fletcher, Liger delivered a Shotei and a brainbuster to Fletcher for the win.

Next, Bandido took on El Phantasmo. Phantasmo got a near-fall after hitting a whirlybird neckbreaker and then delivered a diving senton and a springboard moonsault for the win.

Next, Rocky Romero took on Kip Sabian. Romero countered an inverted Death Valley driver by Sabian and hit an enzuigiri and a running shiranui.

Next, Dean Allmark took on Sho. Sho delivered a Shock Arrow to Allmark for the win.

After the match, a non-tournament match took place, in which Mark Davis took on The Great-O-Kharn. Davis got a near-fall after delivering a Alpamare Waterslide to O-Kharn, after which O-Kharn grabbed the referee to protect himself and delivered a low blow to Davis. O-Kharn then applied a bow and arrow hold to weaken Davis and delivered an Eliminator for the win.

Following that, the first round of the British J-Cup continued as the Undisputed British Cruiserweight Champion David Starr took on Tiger Mask. Starr pulled off Mask's hoodie and pinned him with a roll-up for the win.

Next, Kushida took on Chris Ridgeway. Kushida blocked some kicks by Ridgeway and delivered an enzuigiri, a Buzzsaw Kick and a Back to the Future to Ridgeway for the win.

In the following contest, Ryusuke Taguchi took on Yoh. Taguchi landed a series of hip attacks on Yoh until Yoh delivered an atomic drop that knocked out both competitors. Yoh then landed up on his feet and was awarded the win by beating the referee's count.

It was followed by the final match in the first round between Flamita and Rich Swann. Swann countered a muscle buster by Flamita into a gutbuster and then both men delivered handspring cutters to each other and then Swann followed by delivering a 450° splash to Flamita from the middle rope for the win.

CCK (Chris Brookes and Jonathan Gresham) took on Ringkampf (Timothy Thatcher and Walter) in the main event. Brookes pinned Walter with a roll-up by grabbing his tights for the win.

=== Night 2 ===
==== Semifinals ====
The semifinals and finals were contested at the second night of the British J-Cup. The semifinal started with a match between Jushin Liger and El Phantasmo. After getting a near-fall after delivering a Shotei and a brainbuster to Phantasmo, Liger attempted to deliver a Liger Bomb but Phantasmo countered it with a small package and pinned Liger with it for the win.

Next, David Starr took on Kushida. Starr tried to hit Kushida with the Undisputed British Cruiserweight Championship title belt but the referee snatched the title belt from Starr, allowing Kushida to hit him with a punch and follow it up with a Back to the Future for the win.

It was followed by a six-man tag team match, in which CCK teamed with Chris Ridgeway to take on Dean Allmark, Ryusuke Taguchi and Tiger Mask. Ridgeway made Allmark submit to the rear naked choke for the win.

After that, the semifinals of the British J-Cup continued as Rich Swann took on Yoh. Swann delivered a 450° splash to Yoh for the win.

In the next semifinal match, Rocky Romero took on Sho. Sho tried to deliver a Shock Arrow to Romero but Romero countered it and pinned Sho with a jackknife for the win.

==== Non-tournament matches ====
After the semifinal matches ended, Aussie Open (Kyle Fletcher and Mark Davis) took on MexaBlood (Bandido and Flamita). As Flamita tried to deliver a handspring cutter, Fletcher delivered a Fidget Spinner to Flamita for the win.

Next, The Latin American Exchange (Ortiz and Santana) took on Ringkampf in the penultimate match. Timothy Thatcher and Walter simultaneously applied submission holds on their opponents as Thatcher applied a Fujiwara armbar on Ortiz and Walter applied a Boston crab on Santana, forcing LAX to submit to both holds. As a result, Ringkampf won the match.

==== Final ====
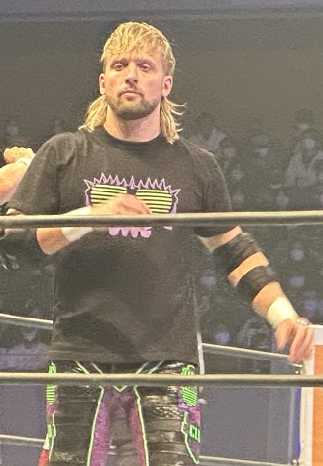
The 2018 tournament winner El Phantasmo

The final of the British J-Cup was a four-way elimination match between El Phantasmo, Kushida, Rich Swann and Rocky Romero. Kushida shoved off Romero as Romero tried to deliver a running shiranui to Kushida. Kushida then applied a Hoverboard Lock on Romero until David Starr interfered in the match and hit Kushida with the British Cruiserweight Championship belt, allowing Romero to eliminate Kushida by pinning him with a roll-up. Phantasmo immediately hit Romero with a superkick to eliminate him, leaving him and Swann as the final two competitors. Swann got a near-fall by delivering a 450° splash to Phantasmo. Phantasmo then delivered a superkick, a senton bomb, a moonsault and multiple diving splashes to pin Swann to win the 2018 British J-Cup.

== Aftermath ==
Phantasmo received a British Cruiserweight Championship match against David Starr at Live at the Cockpit 35 but failed to win the title. Phantasmo then received another opportunity against Starr in a ladder match at Epic Encounter, which Phantasmo won to become the new champion.

== Results ==
Night 1 (September 8)
No.	Results	Stipulations
1	Jushin Liger defeated Kyle Fletcher	2018 British J-Cup tournament first round match
2	El Phantasmo defeated Bandido	2018 British J-Cup tournament first round match
3	Rocky Romero defeated Kip Sabian	2018 British J-Cup tournament first round match
4	Sho defeated Dean Allmark	2018 British J-Cup tournament first round match
5	The Great-O-Kharn (with Gideon Grey) defeated Mark Davis	Singles match
6	David Starr defeated Tiger Mask	2018 British J-Cup tournament first round match
7	Kushida defeated Chris Ridgeway	2018 British J-Cup tournament first round match
8	Yoh defeated Ryusuke Taguchi by count-out	2018 British J-Cup tournament first round match
9	Rich Swann defeated Flamita	2018 British J-Cup tournament first round match
10	CCK (Chris Brookes and Jonathan Gresham) defeated Ringkampf (Timothy Thatcher and Walter)	Tag team match

Night 2 (September 9)
No.	Results	Stipulations
1	El Phantasmo defeated Jushin Liger	2018 British J-Cup tournament semi-final round match
2	Kushida defeated David Starr	2018 British J-Cup tournament semi-final round match
3	CCK (Chris Brookes and Jonathan Gresham) and Chris Ridgeway defeated Dean Allmark, Ryusuke Taguchi and Tiger Mask	Six-man tag team match
4	Rich Swann defeated Yoh	2018 British J-Cup tournament semi-final round match
5	Rocky Romero defeated Sho	2018 British J-Cup tournament semi-final round match
6	Aussie Open (Kyle Fletcher and Mark Davis) defeated MexaBlood (Bandido and Flamita)	Tag team match
7	Ringkampf (Timothy Thatcher and Walter) defeated The Latin American Exchange (Ortiz and Santana)	Tag team match
8	El Phantasmo defeated Kushida, Rich Swann and Rocky Romero	Four-way elimination match in the 2018 British J-Cup tournament final

=== Tournament brackets ===
The tournament brackets were as following:

First Round
Jushin Liger
Kyle Fletcher
Bandido
El Phantasmo
Kip Sabian
Rocky Romero
Dean Allmark
Sho
David Starr
Tiger Mask
Chris Ridgeway
Kushida
Ryusuke Taguchi
Yoh
Flamita
Rich Swann

Semifinals
Jushin Liger
El Phantasmo
Rocky Romero
Sho
David Starr
Kushida
Yoh
Rich Swann

Finalists
El Phantasmo
Rocky Romero
Kushida
Rich Swann

Final
El Phantasmo Rocky Romero
Kushida Rich Swann
