= Connor Mills =

English professional wrestler (born 1998)

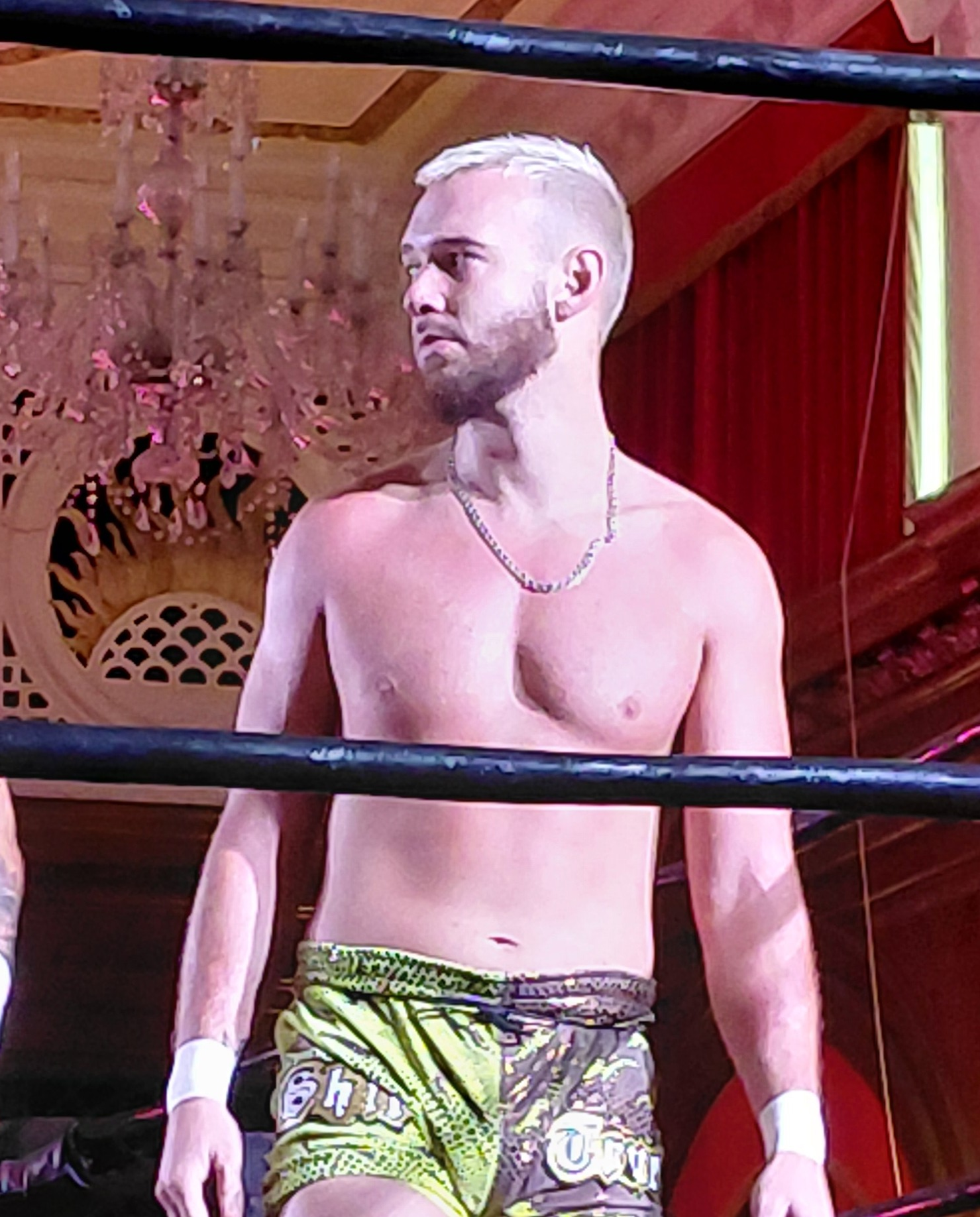
- Mills at RevPro Live in London 100

Personal information
- Born: 12 October 1998 (age 28) Lewisham, England

Professional wrestling career
- Ring name: Connor Danielson Connor Mills
- Billed height: 185 cm (6 ft 1 in)
- Billed weight: 82 kg (181 lb)
- Trained by: Sha Samuels; Darrell Allen; RJ Singh
- Debut: 2015

Connor Mills (born 12 October 1998) is an English professional wrestler. He currently performs on the British independent circuit – predominantly for Revolution Pro Wrestling (RevPro), where he is the current Undisputed British Heavyweight Champion in his first reign.

== Professional wrestling career ==
=== British independent circuit (2015–present) ===
Mills made his professional wrestling debut in British Extreme Championship Wrestling (BECW) at a house show promoted on 2 August 2015, in which he defeated Hades to win the BECW Internet Championship. Mills is known for his tenure with various promotions from the British independent scene such as International Pro Wrestling: United Kingdom (IPW:UK), Attack! Pro Wrestling, New Force Wrestling (NFW) and many others.

=== Progress Wrestling (2016–present) ===
In Progress Wrestling, Mills made his debut at PTNTL:5, an event promoted on 14 November 2016, when he teamed up with James Best in a losing effort against Alexander Roth and Kieran Kurupt in tag team competition.

Mills mainly competes in the promotion's "Chapter" flagship events. He made his debut in one of these kind of events at Chapter 53: Fate Loves The Fearless on 30 July 2017, in which he defeated Spike Trivet in singles competition.

At Chapter 95: Still Chasing on 15 September 2019, Mills competed in a Royal Rumble match for the inaugural Progress Wrestling Proteus Championship, bout won by Paul Robinson and also involving various notable opponents such as Chris Brookes, Eddie Kingston, Ilja Dragunov, Jonathan Gresham, Travis Banks and others. At Progress Chapter 162: The Light Of The Dragon on 28 January 2024, Mills competed in a number one contendership Thunderbastard match for the Progress World Championship won by Kid Lykos and also involving Gene Munny, Luke Jacobs, Mark Haskins, Tate Mayfairs and Yoichi. At Chapter 185: Jump In The Line on 26 October 2025, he teamed up with "Diamond Eyes" tag team partner Nico Angelo to defeat Sunshine Machine (Chuck Mambo and TK Cooper) and win the Progress Tag Team Championship.

Mills also competed in other signature events of the promotion. In the Super Strong Style 16 branch, he made his first appearance at the 2023 edition where he competed outside of the proper tournament, falling short to Spike Trivet in singles competition. He made his debut in the tournament one year later at the 2024 edition where he fell short to Mike Santana in the first rounds.

=== Revolution Pro Wrestling (2020–present) ===
Mills made his debut in Revolution Pro Wrestling at RevPro Live In Southampton 12 on 23 February 2020, when he fell short to Michael Oku.

He competed in various of the promotion's signature events. In the Great British Tag League, he made his first appearance at the 2021 edition of the event where he teamed up with "Destination Anywhere" tag team partner Michael Oku and won the whole tournament by topping the A Block with six point after going against the teams of The Dream Team (Dean Allmark and Robbie X), Young Guns (Ethan Allen and Luke Jacobs) and Lykos Gym (Kid Lykos and Kid Lykos II), then defeated The Legion (Lucian Phillips and Screwface Ahmed) in the finals. Mills also won the 2025 edition of the competition where he teamed up with Jay Joshua and topped the B block with a total of nine points after going against the teams of Sons of Southhampton (David Francisco and JJ Gale), Kieron Lacey and Mark Trew, and CPF (Danny Black and Joe Lando), then defeated Cowboy Way (1 Called Manders and Thomas Shire) in the finals.

In the British J-Cup branch of events, Mills made his first appearance at the 2021 edition he defeated JJ Gale in the first rounds, then fell short to Michael Oku, Luke Jacobs and winner Mike Bailey in the finals. At the 2022 edition, he fell short to Robbie X in the first rounds.

In the RevPro High Stakes branch of events, Mills competed for the first time at the 2021 edition, where he and Michael Oku dropped the British Tag Team Championship to Aussie Open (Kyle Fletcher and Mark Davis). At the 2024 edition, he fell short to Zack Sabre Jr. in singles competition.

At RevPro Summer Sizzler 2022 on 23 July, Mills won a six-way scramble to determine the number one contender for All Elite Wrestling's AEW All-Atlantic Championship, bout which also involved Callum Newman, Man Like DeReiss, Ricky Knight Jr., Will Kroos and Robbie X. He fell short to Pac the same night in the title dispute.

In the RevPro Anniversary Show branch of events, Mills made his first appearance at the RevPro 11th Anniversary Show on 26 August 2023, in which he successfully defended the Undisputed British Cruiserweight Championship against Robbie X, Wild Boar, Jordon Breaks, Callum Newman and Sha Samuels in a Six-way Scramble match. At the RevPro 12th Anniversary Show on 24 August 2024 he fell short to Ethan Allen in singles competition.

In the RevPro Uprising branch, Mills made his first appearance at the 2023 edition where he dropped the Undisputed British Cruiserweight Championship to Leon Slater. At the 2024 edition, he teamed up with Jay Joshua and defeated Sunshine Machine (Chuck Mambo and TK Cooper) to win the Undisputed British Tag Team Championship.

In the Global Wars UK branch of events, Mills made his first appearance at the 2024 edition where he teamed up with Gabe Kidd and Jay Joshua in a losing effort against Hiroshi Tanahashi, Leon Slater, and Zozaya . At the 2025 edition, he fell short to Yuya Uemura in singles competition.

In Fantastica Mania, Mills competed for the first time in the 2024 Fantastica Mexico: UK event where he fell short to Hechicero.

On August 29, 2026, at RevPro's 14th Anniversary Show, Mills defeated Oku to win the Undisputed British Heavyweight Championship, marking his first singles win over Oku in RevPro.

== Championships and accomplishments ==
- Attack! Pro Wrestling
  - Embassy Bingo Cathays Invitational Classic Tournament (2020)
- Banger Zone Wrestling
  - BZW Championship (1 time, current)
  - Miracle Cup (2024)
- British Extreme Championship Wrestling
  - BECW Heavyweight Championship (1 time)
  - BECW 5 Star Championship (1 time)
  - BECW Internet Championship (1 time)
  - King Of British Wrestling Tournament (2016)
- Catch As Catch Can
  - CACC Middleweight Championship (1 time)
- International Wrestling League
  - IWL Championship (1 time, inaugural, final)
- Progress Wrestling
  - Progress Tag Team Championship (2 times, current) – with Nico Angelo
- Pro Wrestling Chaos
  - King Of Chaos Championship (1 time)
  - Knights Of Chaos Championship (1 time) – with Nico Angelo
- Pro Wrestling Illustrated
  - Ranked No. 273 of the top 500 singles wrestlers in the PWI 500 in 2024
- Pro Wrestling SOUL
  - SOUL Men's Championship (1 time, inaugural, final)
  - SOUL Men's Title Tournament (2019)
- Revolution Pro Wrestling
  - Undisputed British Heavyweight Championship (1 time, current)
  - Undisputed British Cruiserweight Championship (1 time)
  - British Tag Team Championship (2 times) – with Michael Oku (1) and Jay Joshua (1)
  - Great British Tag League (2021) – with Michael Oku and (2025) – with Jay Joshua
  - Revolution Rumble (2026)
  - Fifth Triple Crown Champion
- Squash A Jobber Wrestling
  - ASCA Tag Team Championship (1 time) – with Spencer
- United Kingdom Pro Wrestling
  - UKPW Tag Team Championship (1 time) – with Kieran Kurupt
- World Association of Wrestling
  - WAW World Light Heavyweight Championship (1 time)
- WrestleForce
  - WrestleForce International Championship (1 time)
- Other accomplishments
  - Tag Team Tombola Tournament (2023) – with Gene Munny
