= Kurtis Chapman =

British professional wrestler (1997–2023)

Personal information
- Born: 19 December 1997 Portsmouth, England
- Died: 26 December 2023 (aged 26) Portsmouth, England

Professional wrestling career
- Debut: 2014

Kurtis "Mad Kurt" Chapman (19 December 1997 – 28 December 2023) was an English professional wrestler.

== Life and career ==
Kurtis Chapman was born in Portsmouth in 1997 and grew up with two sisters. He made his debut on 25 January 2014 for Revolution Pro Wrestling, where he would wrestle throughout his career. He also made appearances for Game Changer Wrestling and Progress Wrestling. He held the Undisputed British Cruiserweight Championship for 154 days.

On 29 December 2023, it was reported that Chapman had died. He was 26. Eddie Kingston dedicated his victory for the Continental Classic at the World's End event to the memory of Chapman. In January 2025, the coroner recorded a conclusion of suicide by hanging.

== Championships and accomplishments ==
- Wrestling Resurgence
  - Resurgence Arthouse Championship (1 time)
- Revolution Pro Wrestling
  - Undisputed British Cruiserweight Championship (1 time)
