= Senza Volto =

French professional wrestler

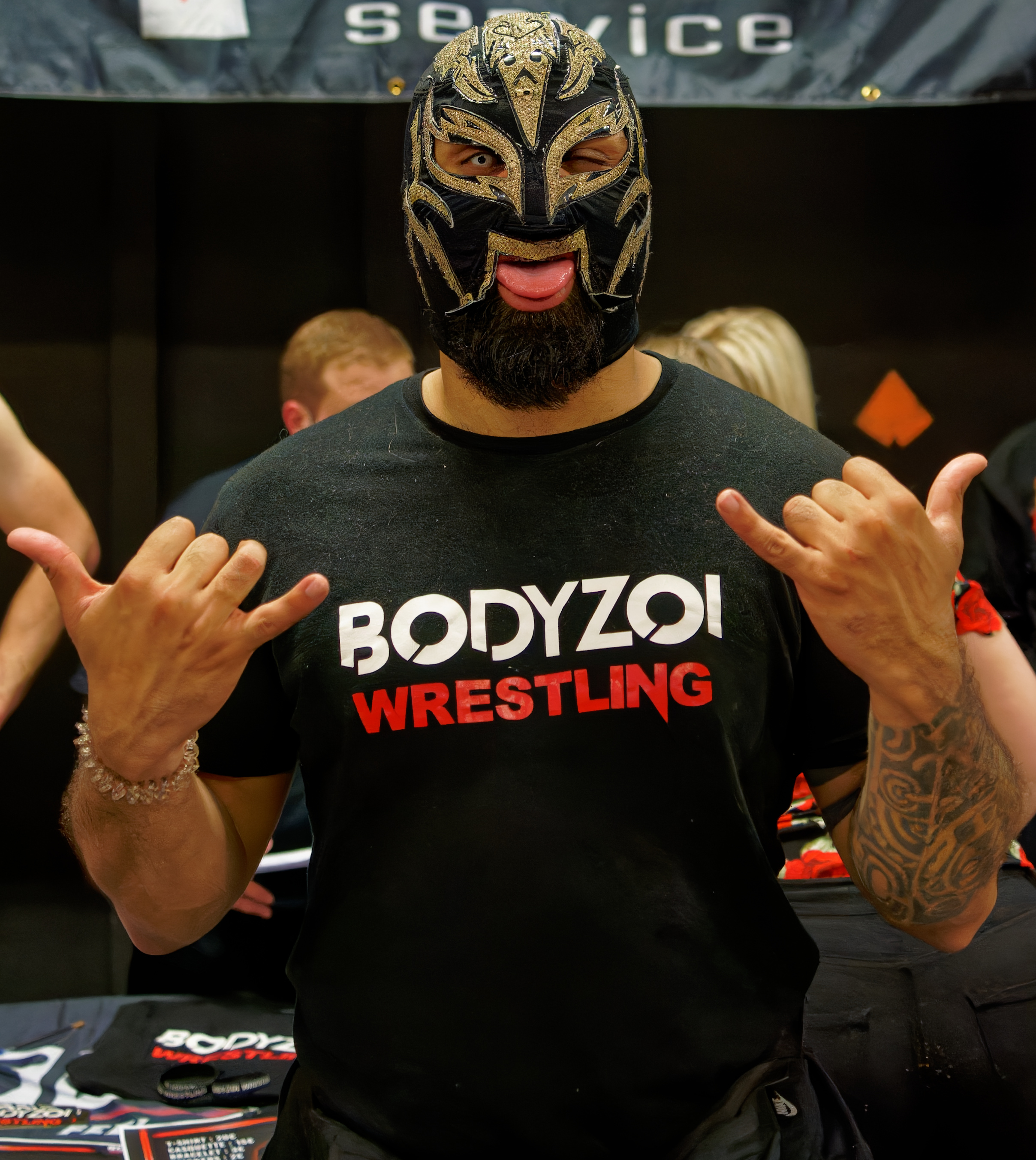
- Volto in May 2023

Personal information
- Born: December 31, 1993 (age 32) Paris, France

Professional wrestling career
- Ring name(s): Senza Volto; Joseph Fenech Jr.
- Billed height: 176 cm (5 ft 9 in)
- Billed weight: 70 kg (154 lb)
- Trained by: Ludovic Vaillant
- Debut: 2014

Vincent Fenech is a French luchador enmascarado (masked professional wrestler) who is primarily known for his work in the German professional wrestling promotion Westside Xtreme Wrestling and in the European independent scene under the ring names of Joseph Fenech Jr. and Senza Volto.

== Professional wrestling career ==
=== European independent circuit (2014–present) ===
Volto is mainly known for his freelance work inside the European independent scene. He briefly competed for the Britiah promotion Revolution Pro Wrestling. He made his first appearance at RevPro Summer Sizzler 2019 on August 30, where he unsuccessfully competed in a six-way scramble match won by Sanada and also involving Hikuleo, Mike Bailey, Robbie Eagles and Rocky Romero. At RevPro Live At The Cockpit 45, an event promoted on September 1, 2019, Volto unsuccessfully challenged El Phantasmo for the Undisputed British Cruiserweight Championship. Besides wXw, the company for which he has worked many times is the German Wrestling Federation. At GWF Battlefield 2022 on September 25, he competed in a battle royal to determine the number one contender for the GWF World Championship won by Erik Sulcani and also involving Axel Tischer, John Klinger, Doug Williams and many others. Volto won the GWF Berlin Championship on two separate occasions and the GWF Tag Team Championship once with Oliver Carter.

=== Westside Xtreme Wrestling (2020–present) ===
Volto made his debut in Westside Xtreme Wrestling at wXw Shortcut To The Top on August 21, 2020, where he unsuccessfully challenged Metehan for the wXw Shotgun Championship. He continued to make sporadic appearances for the company and eventually formed the tag team of "Frenchadors" alongside Aigle Blanc, and began participating in tournaments to determine the number one contendership for the wXw World Tag Team Championship. Their first one was the one which started at wXw We Love Wrestling #5 on March 19, 2021, where they defeated The Arrows Of Hungary (Dover and Icarus), but fell short to The Pretty Bastards (Maggot and Prince Ahura) two nights later. Volto often works in singles competition. At wXw We Love Wrestling #12 on May 14, 2021, he participated in a battle royal to determine the number one contender for the WXw Unified World Wrestling Championship won by Levaniel and also involving notable opponents such as Tristan Archer and Vincent Heisenberg. At Shortcut To The Top 2021 on July 30, Volto participated in the traditional 30-man match won by Jurn Simmons and also involving Bobby Gunns, Norman Harras, Robert Dreissker, Levaniel Fast Time Moodo, Peter Tihanyi and others.

== Personal life ==
In an interview from 2017, Volto cited Rey Mysterio and Ricochet as two of his biggest inspirations from the professional wrestling world. He also explained the origin of his ring name of Senza Volto meaning "no face" in Italian, as a reference to his luchador persona.

== Championships and accomplishments ==
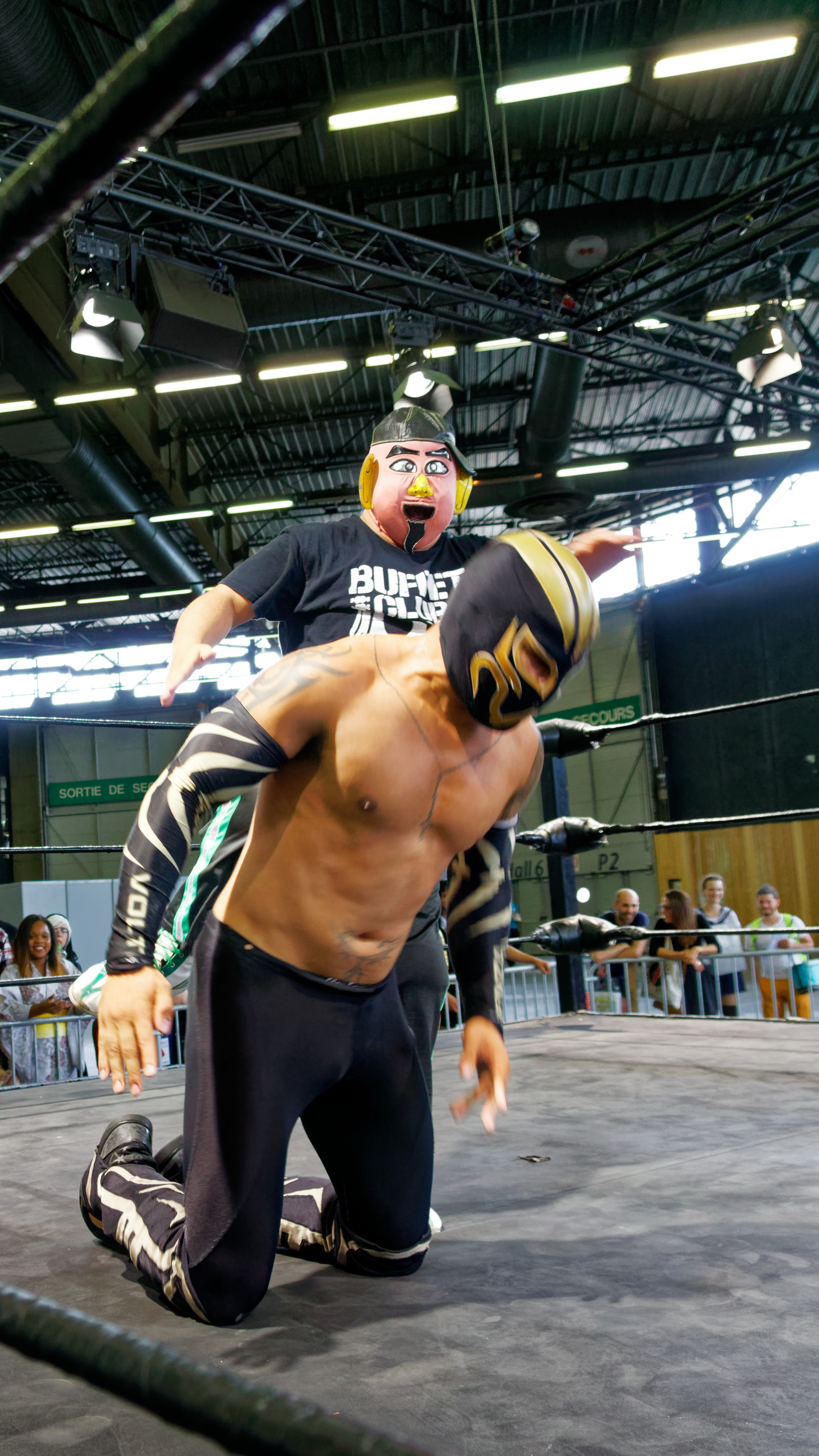
Volto facing Kikutaro in July 2018.

- BodyZoï Wrestling / Banger Zone Wrestling
  - BodyZoï Championship/BZW Championship (2 times)
  - BodyZoi Title #1 Contendership Tournament (2023)
- Catch As Catch Can
  - CACC Supreme Championship (1 time, current)
- Championship Of Wrestling
  - cOw/WPWI United Championship (1 time)
- Association les Professionnels Du Catch
  - APC Championship (1 time)
- German Wrestling Federation
  - GWF Berlin Championship (2 times)
  - GWF Tag Team Championship (1 time) – with Oliver Carter
- International Catch Wrestling Alliance
  - ICWA European Tag Team Championship (1 time) – with Ace Angel
- Passion Pro
  - Passion Cup (2021)
- Pro Wrestling Illustrated
  - Ranked No. 208 of the top 500 singles wrestlers in the PWI 500 in 2025
  - Ranked No. 217 of the top 500 singles wrestlers in the PWI 500 in 2024
- Pro Wrestling Allstars
  - PWA DareDevil Championship (1 time, inaugural)
  - PWA DareDevil Title Tournament (2016)
- Pro Wrestling Showdown
  - PWS Tag Team Championship (1 time) – with Mark Benjamin
- Southside Wrestling Entertainment
  - SWE European Championship (1 time)
  - SWE Speed King Championship (1 time)
- Tigers Pro Wrestling
  - TPW Tag Team Championship (1 time) – with Vince NT
- Westside Xtreme Wrestling
  - wXw Shotgun Championship (1 time)
  - wXw World Tag Team Championship (1 time) – with Aigle Blanc
  - wXw World Tag Team Festival (2022) – with Aigle Blanc
- WrestlingKULT
  - WrestlingKULT No Limits Championship (1 time)
- Xperience Wrestling
  - Xperience Wrestling M Division Championship (1 time)
