= Michael Oku =

English professional wrestler (born 1993)

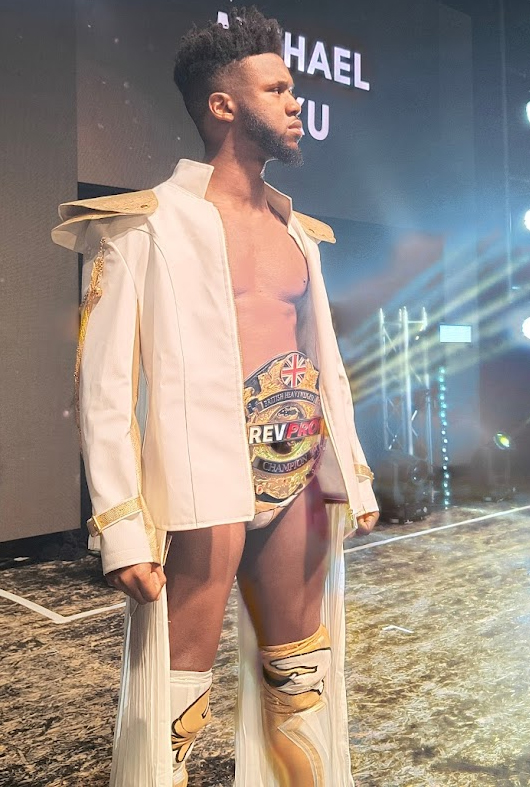
- Oku in 2024

Personal information
- Born: Michael Jordan Oku; 28 April 1993 (age 33) London, England

Professional wrestling career
- Ring name(s): Michael Oku; The OJMO
- Billed height: 6 ft 0 in (183 cm)
- Billed weight: 176 lb (80 kg)
- Billed from: Old Street, London, England
- Trained by: Eddie Dennis
- Debut: 2017

Michael Oku (born 1993) is an English professional wrestler. He currently performs on the British independent circuit – predominantly for Revolution Pro Wrestling (RevPro), where he is a former three-time Undisputed British Heavyweight Champion. He also makes sporadic appearances with All Elite Wrestling (AEW) and Ring of Honor (ROH).

== Professional wrestling career ==
=== Revolution Pro Wrestling (2018–present) ===
Oku debuted for Revolution Pro Wrestling (RevPro), facing Great-O-Khan in a losing effort. On January 6, 2019, he fought for Team ELP and lost an eight man tag team match against Team David Starr. He soon started having a losing before defeating the Undisputed British Cruiserweight Champion El Phantasmo in a non-title match, which earn him a title match at RevPro Summer Sizzler, which he failed to win. On November 24, Oku defeated Rocky Romero in the first round and made El Phantasmo submit in a four-way elimination match to win the 2019 British J-Cup. After the match, he was attacked by Pac. He would get his revenge, by defeating Pac at Uprising on December 15.

On February 14, 2020, at High Stakes, Oku defeated Phantasmo for the British Cruiserweight Championship. On September 13, 2020, at Epic Encounters 2, Oku defeated Ricky Knight Jr. to unify the title with the Southside Speed King Championship. He soon started appearing in tag matches with Connor Mills as Destination Everywhere and, after Great British Tag League over Dean Allmark and Lee Hunter, won the British Tag Team Championship on The Legion (Lucian Phillips and Screwface Ahmed) in the finals to win the vacant titles. After three months, Destination Everywhere lost their British Tag Team Championship to Aussie Open (Kyle Fletcher and Mark Davis) in a winner takes all match, where Aussie Open's PWA Tag Team Championship was also in the line. After a two-year reign, with a number of title defences, Oku lost the Undisputed British Cruiserweight Championship to Luke Jacobs, ending his reign at 890 days.

Oku ended up winning the 2023 RevPro Revolution Rumble, earning a match for the Undisputed British Heavyweight Championship, which he won by defeating Great-O-Khan on July 7, 2023, at Epic Encounter. Oku made his first title defence on August 26 at RevPro 11th Anniversary Show, defeating Trent Seven. On September 23, Oku made another defence, defeating Hechicero at RevPro/CMLL Fantastica Mania UK night 2. On October 23 at British J-Cup, Oku defended his title against Gabe Kidd. A month later, Oku defended his title against Luke Jacobs and made his final title defence of the year, against Zack Gibson.

Oku made his first title defence of 2024, defeating Will Ospreay at High Stakes, in Ospreay's final match with the company.

At RevPro Summer Sizzler 2024, Oku unsuccessfully challenged MJF for the AEW American Championship. On August 24 at RevPro 12th Anniversary Show, Oku lost the Undisputed British Heavyweight Championship to Luke Jacobs, ending his reign at 412 days. He regained the title on December 21 at Uprising. On July 25, 2025, at Summer Sizzler, Oku lost the title to Ricky Knight Jr, ending his second reign at 216 days.

On June 7, 2026 at Live in London 108, he defeated Jay Joshua to win his third Undisputed British Heavyweight Championship, but lost the title to Connor Mills two months later on August 29 at RevPro's 14th Anniversary Show.

=== New Japan Pro Wrestling (2022–2023) ===
Oku made his New Japan Pro-Wrestling debut at Royal Quest II on October 1, 2022, teaming with Ricky Knight Jr. defeating United Empire (Great-O-Khan and Gideon Grey). The next night, he and Robbie X was defeated by Suzuki-gun (El Desperado and Douki).

On October 14, 2023, at Royal Quest III, Oku returned to New Japan Pro-Wrestling teaming with Hiroshi Tanahashi and Strong Openweight Champion Eddie Kingston defeating United Empire members TJP, Henare, and Jeff Cobb.

=== Consejo Mundial de Lucha Libre (2024–present) ===
It was announced on May 1, 2024, in CMLL Informa that he would participate in Fantastica Mania México 2024 and later a tour. On June 14 at Arena Mexico he debuted, losing against Templario. On June 15 at the Arena Coliseo he defeated Volador Jr. On June 16 in the Arena Mexico he teamed up with Bad Dude Tito and Che Cabrera but they lost against Último Guerrero, Angel de Oro and Gran Guerrero. On June 17 at the Arena Puebla, Mistico's 20th anniversary was celebrated, he teamed up with Bad Dude Tito and Che Cabrera where they defeated Los Depredadores (Volador Jr., Magnus and Rugido). On June 18, he defended his title against Angel de Oro at the Arena Mexico. On June 19, Michael Oku, along with Amira Blair and Okumura, received the invitation from the Deputy Head of the British Embassy, Carol van der Walt, and Rachel Brazier, Chargé d'Affaires.

=== All Elite Wrestling / Ring of Honor (2024–present) ===
Oku made his All Elite Wrestling (AEW) debut before the August 21, 2024 episode of Dynamite, defeating Serpentico in a dark match. On April 17, 2025, Oku made his debut for AEW's sister promotion Ring of Honor (ROH) on Ring of Honor Wrestling, losing to Nick Wayne. On July 11 at Supercard of Honor, Oku was defeated by Hechicero.

== Championships and accomplishments ==
- Battle Pro Wrestling
  - BPW Championship (1 time)
- Chris Jericho's Rock 'N' Wrestling Rager at Sea
  - Jericho Cruise Oceanic Championship (1 time)
- Lucha Libre Barcelona
  - LLB Absolute Championship (1 time)
- Pro Wrestling Illustrated
  - Ranked No. 38 of the top 500 singles wrestlers in the PWI 500 in 2024.
- WrestleForce
  - WrestleForce Undisputed Championship (1 time)
- Purpose Wrestling
  - Purpose Wrestling Championship (1 time)
- Revolution Pro Wrestling
  - Undisputed British Heavyweight Championship (3 times)
  - Undisputed British Cruiserweight Championship (1 time)
  - Undisputed British Tag Team Championship (1 time) – with Connor Mills
  - British J-Cup (2019)
  - Great British Tag League (2021) – with Connor Mills
  - Revolution Rumble (2023)
  - Third Triple Crown Champion
- Riot Cabaret Pro Wrestling
  - Riot Cabaret World Championship (1 time)
- Southside Wrestling Entertainment
  - SWE Speed King Championship (1 time, final)
- Wrestling Observer Newsletter
  - Europe MVP (2024, 2025)
