= Robbie X =

English professional wrestler

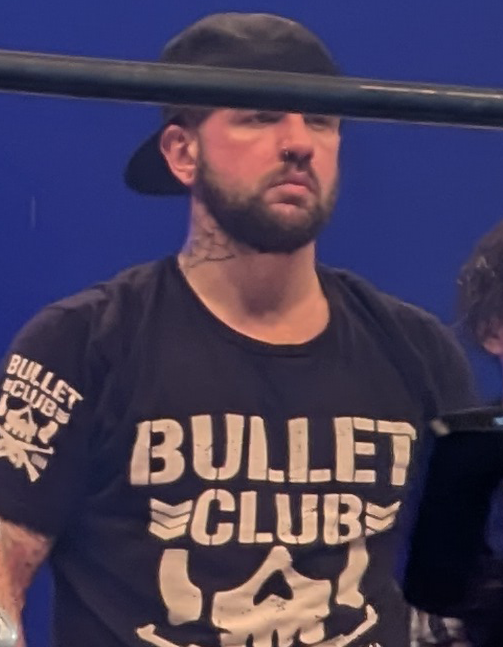
- Robbie X in 2024

Personal information
- Born: Robert Bell; 6 January 1995 (age 31) Lincoln, England

Professional wrestling career
- Ring name(s): Robbie X Rob Bell; Super Robbie; Bobbie Kiss
- Billed height: 1.65 m (5 ft 5 in)
- Billed weight: 172 lb (78 kg)
- Billed from: Lincoln, England
- Trained by: Keith Myatt; Tommy Boyce
- Debut: 2008

Robert Bell (born 6 January 1995), better known by his ring name Robbie X is an English professional wrestler. He works as a freelancer―predominantly on the British independent circuit and in Japan for New Japan Pro-Wrestling (NJPW), where he is a member of Unbound Co. and is a former IWGP Junior Heavyweight Tag Team Champion with stablemate Taiji Ishimori.

== Professional wrestling career ==
=== British independent circuit (2008–present) ===
Robbie X made his professional wrestling debut in 2008 for One Pro Wrestling, before featuring for promotions including This is Wrestling, Gerry Norton Promotions, Southside Wrestling Entertainment, Real Deal Wrestling, Dynamic Pro Wrestling and Shooting Star Wrestling between 2008 and 2012. Robbie X's first title win came on 28 October 2012, when he defeated Jonathan Gresham, Martin Kirby and champion Marty Scurll to win the SWE Speed King Title in an elimination match. On 17 November 2013, Robbie X & Mark Haskins won the SWE Tag Team Championship. Robbie X Made his TNT Extreme Wrestling debut on 2 February 2016. On 25 January 2025, Robbie X won the TNT Ultra X Champion. He vacated the title on 31 May 2025.

=== New Generation Wrestling (2012–2020) ===
On 21 January 2012, Robbie X appeared for New Generation Wrestling at their event NGW Dawn of Heroes, teaming with Avian in a losing effort against Team GB (Sam Bailey & Zack Gibson). On 8 December 2012. at Eternal Glory Robbie X teamed with Dean Allmark to challenge for the NGW Tag Team Title in a ladder match against champions Team GB, Los Amigos (Dara Diablo & El Ligero), and The Predators (Joseph Conners & Paul Malen) in which the champions retained. On 16 March 2013, Robbie X featured in a 30-man Royal Rumble match for the vacant NGW Heavyweight Title at NGW Destiny. On 26 July 2014, Robbie X won the Davey Boy Smith Cup, defeating Bubblegum in a tournament final at NGW Anarchy. On 7 February 2015, Robbie X competed for the NGW Undisputed Title in a losing effort to Rampage Brown.

On 23 September 2017, Robbie X won the NGW GenX Title, winning a four-way ladder match at NGW Regeneration-X against Jake McCluskey, Kip Sabian and Matt Myers Robbie X successfully defended the title against Kip Saibian at Eternal Glory on 23 December 2017 and again at Collision Course on 25 November 2018, this time beating Myles Kayman. He finally lost the title to Lucas Steel at Eternal Glory on 14 December 2018.

On 7 December 2019, at Eternal Glory, Robbie X & Matt Myers won the NGW Tag Team Title in a tournament final match against Nathan Cruz & Rampage Brown.

=== Revolution Pro Wrestling (2013–present) ===
Robbie X made his Revolution Pro Wrestling debut on 26 May 2013, in a losing effort to Marty Scurll at RevPro Road To Thunder. His next appearance would not be until 3 November 2019 in a loss to Senza Volto.

On 31 July 2021, at RevPro Day of Reckoning, Robbie X challenged for the Undisputed British Cruiserweight Championship, his match against champion Michael Oku ending in a no contest after interference from The Legion (Mark Haskins & Chris Ridgeway). In a rematch on 21 August 2021 at the Nine Year RevPro Anniversary Show, Robbie X was defeated by Oku. Robbie X again unsuccessfully challenged for the title at RevPro High Stakes on 19 September 2021 in a Triple Threat match against Michael Oku and Chris Ridgeway.

On 23 July 2022 at RevPro Summer Sizzler, Robbie X competed in a number 1 contender match for the AEW All-Atlantic Championship alongside Callum Newman, Man Like DeReiss, Ricky Knight Jr., Will Kroos and eventual winner Connor Mills.

Robbie X won the Undisputed British Cruiserweight Championship on 17 December 2022, at RevPro Uprising, defeating defending champion Luke Jacobs, Dan Moloney and Will Kaven in an elimination match. He would lose the title to Connor Mills on 9 July 2023, at RevPro Epic Encounter.

=== New Japan Pro-Wrestling (2022–present) ===
Robbie X appeared for New Japan Pro-Wrestling (NJPW) on 2 October 2022 at Royal Quest II, teaming with Michael Oku in a losing effort against Suzuki-gun (Douki & El Desperado). On 14 October 2023, at Royal Quest III, Robbie X was defeated by Taiji Ishimori.

On 20 October 2024 at Royal Quest IV, Robbie X was revealed as the newest member of Bullet Club and teamed with Ishimori to defeat Danny Black and Joe Lando. The duo then announced that they would compete in the Super Junior Tag League. In 2025, Robbie X joined the War Dogs sub-group of Bullet Club along with Ishimori.

After Wrestle Kingdom 20, at New Year Dash!!, David Finlay and Yota Tsuji announced the dissolution of Bullet Club and Mushozoku, replacing the alliance with Unbound Co., which was a complete merger. On 6 March 2026 at NJPW's 54th Anniversary Show, Robbie X and Ishimori defeated Ichiban Sweet Boys (Robbie Eagles and Kosei Fujita) to win the IWGP Junior Heavyweight Tag Team Championship, only to lose it back to Ichiban Sweet Boys a month later at Wrestling RedZone. On November 3 at Power Struggle, Ishimori and Robbie X defeated the Ichiban Sweet Boys to win the 2026 Super Junior Tag League.

=== Consejo Mundial de Lucha Libre (2023–present) ===
On 23 September 2023, Robbie X made his debut for Mexican promotion Consejo Mundial de Lucha Libre (CMLL) in their UK show Fantastica Mania losing to Titán, before defeating Magia Blanca. On 19 May 2024, he went on to appear in Fantastica Mania 2024, losing to Bárbaro Cavernario. On 17 July 2024, he was announced as a participant in the 2024 Grand Prix. On 16 August 2024, Robbie X made his debut on CMLL Super Viernes at Arena México, defeating Neón in a Lightning Match. On 17 August 2024, Robbie X teamed with Rocky Romero and Mansoor to defeat Titán, Templario and Flip Gordon at the Arena Coliseo. On 18 August 2024, Robbie X teamed with Mansoor and Flip Gordon losing against Atlantis Jr., Máscara Dorada and Ángel de Oro at the Arena México. On 19 August 2024, Robbie X teamed with Rocky Romero and Kyle Fletcher losing against Místico, Atlantis Jr. and Templario at the Arena Puebla.

=== All Elite Wrestling (2025) ===
Robbie X made his All Elite Wrestling (AEW) debut on the 20 August 2025 episode of Dynamite, where he and Bullet Club War Dogs stablemates Clark Connors and Drilla Moloney attempted to assist the Death Riders (Claudio Castagnoli, Jon Moxley, and Wheeler Yuta) in their match against Hiroshi Tanahashi and JetSpeed (Kevin Knight and "Speedball" Mike Bailey), but were fended off by The Opps (Katsuyori Shibata, Powerhouse Hobbs, and Samoa Joe). On 24 August, at Forbidden Door Zero Hour, the Bullet Club War Dogs unsuccessfully challenged The Opps for the AEW World Trios Championship.

== Championships and accomplishments ==
- Attack! Pro Wrestling
  - ATTACK! 24:7 Championship (4 times)
- Burning Heart Pro Wrestling
  - Burning Hearts Pro Tag Team Championship (1 time, inaugural) – with Zachary Wentz
- British Wrestling Revolution
  - BWR Cruiserweight Championship (2 times)
  - BWR Heavyweight Championship (1 time)
  - BWR Underground Championship (1 time)
- Kamikaze Pro
  - Kamikaze Pro Championship (1 time)
  - Kamikaze Pro Relentless Championship (1 time)
  - Kamikaze Pro Tag Team Championship (1 time) – with Damian Dunne
- New Generation Wrestling
  - NGW GenX Championship (1 time)
  - NGW Tag Team Championship (1 time) – with Matt Myers
- One Pro Wrestling
  - 1PW Openweight Championship (1 time, final)
- Pro Wrestling Illustrated
  - Ranked No. 210 of the top 500 singles wrestlers in the PWI 500 in 2026
- Real Deal Wrestling
  - RDW Zero G Championship (1 time)
- Rebel County Wrestling
  - RCW Rebel X Championship (1 time)
- Revolution Pro Wrestling
  - Undisputed British Cruiserweight Championship (1 time)
  - British J-Cup (2022)
- New Japan Pro-Wrestling
  - IWGP Junior Heavyweight Tag Team Championship (1 time) – with Taiji Ishimori
  - Super Jr. Tag League (2026) – with Taiji Ishimori
- Southside Wrestling Entertainment
  - Southside Heavyweight Championship (1 time)
  - SWE Speed King Championship (3 times)
  - SWE Tag Team Championship (3 times) – with Mark Haskins (1), Damian Dunne (1) and Big Grizzly (1)
- Target Wrestling
  - High Octane Division Championship (1 time)
