= Gordon Craig Theatre =

Theatre in Stevenage, Hertfordshire, England

The Gordon Craig Theatre
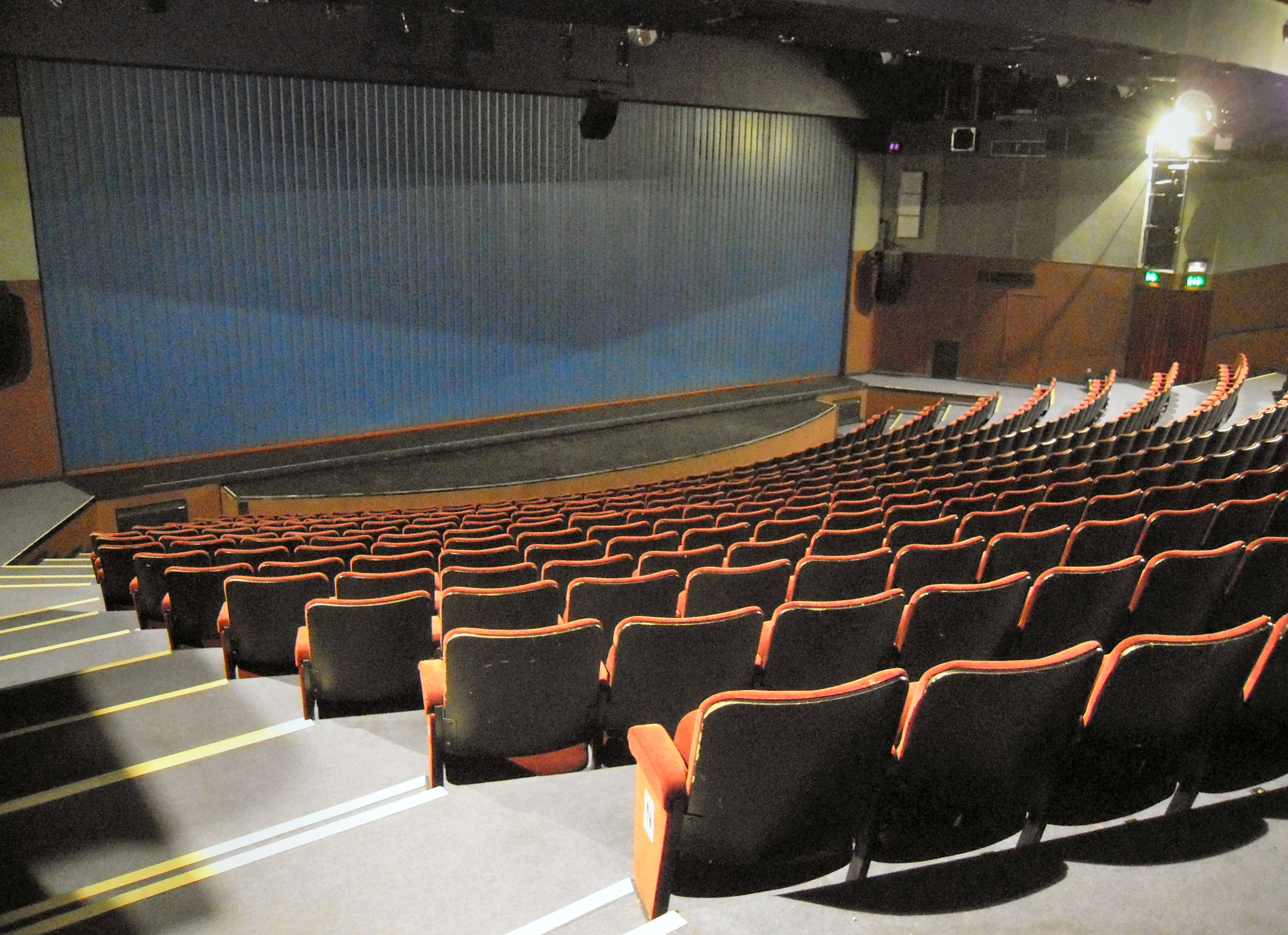
- The Gordon Craig Theatre Auditorium
- Interactive map of The Gordon Craig Theatre
- Address: Lytton Way; Stevenage, Hertfordshire
- Coordinates: 51.9010409018°N 0.2055322816°W
- Owner: Stevenage Borough Council
- Operator: Everyone Active (Everyone Theatres)
- Capacity: 1,701 (across 2 halls)

Construction
- Opened: 1975
- Architect: Ray Gorbing

Website
- The Gordon Craig Theatre

The Gordon Craig Theatre is a theatre in Stevenage, Hertfordshire. Opened in 1975, the 501-seat theatre on Lytton Way houses a rehearsal room, scenic workshop, wardrobe, café, bar, and art gallery.

== Overview ==
The theatre is housed in the Stevenage Arts & Leisure Centre, which is situated on Lytton Way, and takes its name from Edward Gordon Craig, the theatre practitioner who was born less than a mile away. Designed to accommodate orchestral concerts alongside produced and visiting theatrical events, it has also been used to screen films and host organ recitals. The Theatres Trust describes the theatre as: "probably the best-designed civic entertainment centre of its type in the country".

The theatre was officially opened in February 1976 by HRH Prince Philip, Duke of Edinburgh.

The Stevenage Arts & Leisure Centre contains two halls. The smaller of these is the Gordon Craig Theatre itself, which has a capacity of 501. The stage features a proscenium up to 12.2m wide and the stage depth is 7.62m. The theatre boasts a proud tradition of presenting plays, pantomime, opera, dance and orchestral concerts.

The venue also celebrates 50 years of providing Entertainment and Pantomimes in November this year (2025) and is celebrating by holding a Gala Event on the 27th November 2025. The Pantomime chosen for the 50th year returns to the first Pantomime staged at the Gordon Craig Theatre, Dick Whittington & His Cat.

Also located within the Arts & Leisure Centre is the Concert Hall, derived from a large gymnasium, which has a capacity of 1,200. The concert hall plays host to a variety of shows including live music and comedy.

== History ==
From the early 1960s there was discussion on the need for an Arts / Leisure centre in the new town of Stevenage. In 1968, Stevenage Arts Trust resolved to commence the building of an Arts Centre on land granted by Stevenage Development Corporation. Architects Messrs Vincent, Gorbing and Partners drew up detailed plans for a 488-seat theatre to cost £300,000. The scheme was put on hold due to a lack of capital. In 1968 a feasibility study was commissioned by Stevenage Urban District Council and the Stevenage Development Corporation for a combined Arts/Sports Centre. In 1969 Stevenage Urban District Council and Stevenage Development Corporation accepted the Initial Design Brief prepared by the architects. In 1972, the architects confirmed that the final design drawings were completed, the final cost was estimated at £1,610,218. The foundation stone was laid on 14 June 1974 by Baroness Lee, the former Labour minister, Jennie Lee. Opening for The Danesgate Theatre, as the building was then to be known, was planned for November 1975.

=== Naming and Openings ===
On the suggestion of Roger Dyason, the first Arts' Manager of the Centre, proposal was made in August 1975 to a Full Council Meeting of Stevenage Borough Council that the theatre should be named The Gordon Craig Theatre. This motion was passed. The £2.7 million sports and arts centre opened to the public on 3 November 1975 with a gala variety bill produced by Bunny Baron featuring Ted Rogers. The Leisure Centre was officially opened in February 1976 by HRH Prince Philip, The Duke of Edinburgh, accompanied by the Director of Leisure Services at Stevenage Borough Council, Mr M. L. Banks.

=== Design ===
The theatre has a plain, fan-shaped auditorium with excellent sightlines. It is a modern, fully-equipped touring and, occasionally, producing theatre with fourteen dressing rooms, and an optional orchestra pit. it has also been used for cinema screenings.

Architect Ray Gorbing's original exterior design proved controversial. It attracted both admirers and those horrified at the aesthetic of the building. Panels of glass and reinforced plastic had been used to insulate the building against noise from rail, road and overhead aircraft. The orange coloured cladding led to it being nicknamed "Gorbing’s orange box". The Architects' Journal described the building: "designed as a simple rectangular coloured box… it reflects the integration of activities within and also expresses the introvert nature of these activities…the bright colour provides a positive image." The orange cladding was later replaced.

== Performances ==
The programme offered by the Gordon Craig Theatre is currently strongly focused on music (including tribute bands), comedy, popular dance, popular entertainment and family shows. The theatre also plays host to productions presented by local amateur and community groups. In addition, since 2012 the theatre has produced three shows in-house annually, incorporating musicals and drama.

=== Pantomimes ===
One of the major highlights of the yearly programme is the pantomime.

Pantomimes at The Gordon Craig Theatre
Year	Production	Cast Included:	Director	Producer	Ticket Prices	Features	Refs.
1975/1976	Dick Whittington	George Chishold, Alan Wells, Don Crann, Sandra Carrier, Jackie Gaytone, Graham Woolnough		Bunny Baron	£0.70–1.00		
1976/1977	Cinderella	Adrienne Posta, Anita Graham, Elizabeth Suggars, Henry Metcalfe, Stanley Beard, Vivienne McKee	Robin Bowditch	Mark Furness	£1.00–1.40	two real ponies	
1977/1978	Babes in the Wood	Alan Granville, Davies and Gray, Elise Gilman-Abel, Eunice Black, Jan Austen, John Boulter, John Bromley, Rodney Diak	Tony Clayton		£1.10–1.60		
1978/1979	Mother Goose						
1979/1980	Aladdin	Alan Randall, Carol Leroy, David Barry, David Masterman, George Reibbitt, Roz Cole, Sara Rae-Maddern, Valentine Palmer	Ron Richards	Malcolm Knight	£1.40–2.00		
1980/1981	Jack and the Beanstalk	Bob Grant, Charlie Gray	Ron Richards	Malcolm Knight	£1.80 - £2.50		
1981/1982	Sinbad the Sailor	Alan Randall, Ken Wilson, Michele Breeze, Richard Wilding, Adam Daye and John O’Flynn	Ron Richards	Malcolm Knight	£2.20–3.20		
1982/1983	Goldilocks and the Three Bears	Deborah Watling, Colin Baker, Michael Sharvill Martin, Spencer K Gibbins, Davis & Field					
1983/1984	Cinderella	Peter Byrne, Betty Benfield, Kathryn Apanowicz, Ken Wood, Linda Hayden, Nigel Ellacot, Peter Robbins, Spencer K. Gibbins	Peter Byrne	Paul Elliott	£2.25–4.00	Perrier Petite Ponies	
1984/1985	Puss in Boots	Andrew Betts, Bobby Crush, Carol Leroy, Georgina Cole Young Set, Jane Stevens, John Ayldon, Mimi Law		Charles Haley Productions	£2.25 - £4.00		
1985/1986	Snow White and the Seven Dwarfs	Nicholas Smith, Nicola Bryant	Kevin Wood	Kevin Wood Productions			
1986/1987	Aladdin	Floella Benjamin, Paul Laidlaw, Peter Denyer		Kevin Wood Productions			
1987/1988	Dick Whittington	Ian Lavender, Ricky Simmons, Jane Hardy, Peter Denyer		Kevin Wood Productions	£2.80–5.30		
1988/1989	Babes in the Wood	John Clegg, Nigel Pivaro, Paul Laidlaw, Tessa Hatts	Paul Laidlaw	Kevin Wood Productions	£3.25–5.95	a real waterfall	
1989/1990	Cinderella	Barbara Windsor, Richard Whitmore, Bobbie Lawrence, Paul Laidlaw, Steve Marsh, Richard Swerrun	Paul Laidlaw	Kevin Wood Productions	£3.25–6.50		
1990/1991	Mother Goose	Alfred Marks, Terry Hall, Paul Laidlaw, Steve Marsh, Dorothy Vernon, Claire Woyka, Peter Russell, Nigel Makin		Kevin Wood Productions	£3.50–7.00	dancing fountains	
1991/1992	Jack and the Beanstalk	Ruth Madoc, Paul Laidlaw, Steve Marsh	Paul Laidlaw	Kevin Wood Productions	£4.65–8.15		
1992/1993	Puss in Boots	Jack Smethurst, Paul Laidlaw, David Horn, Terry Gleed, Andrew Truluck	Paul Laidlaw	Kevin Wood Productions			
1993/1994	Aladdin	Barbara Windsor, Paul Laidlaw, Jeff Stevenson	Paul Laidlaw	Kevin Wood Productions	£5.00–9.50	flying carpet, cascading waterfall	
1994/1995	Snow White and the Seven Dwarfs	Maggie Dence (Neighbours), Michelle Hatch, Warwick Davis, Kim Smith, Andrew Truluck	Malcolm Farquhar	Kevin Wood Productions			
1995/1996	Dick Whittington	John Altman, Colin Deveraux, John Pickard, Mark Rattray, Andrew Truluck, Amanda Noar	Peter Denyer	Kevin Wood Productions			
1996/1997	Sleeping Beauty	Kate O'mara, Mark Rattray	Peter Denyer	Kevin Wood Pantomimes	£6.50–11.25		
1997/1998	Jack and the Beanstalk	Toby Anstis, Jess Conrad, Colin Devereaux, Alistair Divall, Deborah Chad	Peter Denyer	Kevin Wood Pantomimes	£7.00–11.25		
1998/1999	Cinderella	Romana D'Annunzio, Arvid Larsen, Paul Zerdin, Richard Cawley, Scott St Martyn, Richard Whitmore, Joanne Conway	Peter Denyer	Kevin Wood Pantomimes		Ice Skating Scene	
1999/2000	Aladdin	Diane Louise Jordan (Blue Peter), Colin Devereaux, Warwick Davis, Marcel Bracks (Heartbreak High) and Philip Madoc	Peter Denyer	Kevin Wood Pantomimes	£7.95–12.45	jewelled cavern, laser spectacular	
2000/2001	Snow White and the Seven Dwarfs	Toyah Willcox, Colin Devereaux, Warwick Davis, Jez Edwards, Scott St Martyn, Sophie Martin, Stephen Gaunt	Peter Denyer	Kevin Wood Pantomimes	£7.25–12.85	laser in the forest	
2001/2002	Dick Whittingdon	Jez Edwards, Jonathan Owen, Lynette McMorrough, Peter Duncan, Philip Madoc, Scott St Martin	Peter Denyer	Kevin Wood Pantomimes		laser show	
2002/2003	Cinderella	Bradley Walsh, Jack Edwards, Lynette McMorrough, Melissa Familly, Scott St Martyn, Stephen Hunt	Peter Denyer	Kevin Wood Pantomimes		Real Ponies and Carriage	
2003/2004	Jack and the Beanstalk	Bradley Walsh, Paul Laidlaw, Emily Brooks, Jack Edwards, Ben Dudley, Amanda Hall	Paul Laidlaw	Kevin Wood Pantomimes		Laser Show	
2004/2005	Aladdin	Gemma Harris, Graham Kent, Lucy Benjamin, Mike McClean, Paul Laidlaw, Scott St Martyn	Paul Laidlaw	Kevin Wood Pantomimes	£8.00–17.00	Laser Show	
2005/2006	Snow White and the Seven Dwarfs	Shane Lynch, Sarah Shepherd, Paul Laidlaw, Ben Roddy, Steve Walls	Paul Laidlaw	Kevin Wood Pantomimes	£10.00–17.75		
2006/2007	Dick Whittington	Paul Laidlaw, Jack Edwards, Sheila Ferguson (The Three Degrees and I'm a Celebrity), Stefan Booth (Hollyoaks)	Paul Laidlaw	Evolution Pantomimes	£9.00–19.50	Projection Underwater Scene	
2007/2008	Cinderella	Ben Nicholas, Amanda Barrie, Paul Laidlaw, Scott St. Martyn, Ben Roddy, Rachel Jerram	Paul Laidlaw	Evolution Pantomimes		Real Ponies and Carriage	
2008/2009	Jack and the Beanstalk	Ben Nicholas, David Spinx, Claire Huckle, Kate Burrell, Keith Miller, Paul Burling, Paul Laidlaw, Scott St Martyn	Paul Laidlaw	Evolution Pantomimes		Laser Show	
2009/2010	Aladdin	John Altman, Paul Laidlaw, Tom Beard, Phil Holden, Junix Inocian, Kate Burrell, Craig Perry, Laura Emmitt	Paul Laidlaw	Evolution Pantomimes		Laser Show	
2010/2011	Snow White and the Seven Dwarfs	Sue Holderness, Daniel Boys, Paul Laidlaw, Katie Rowley-Jones, Chris Clarkson, Claire Rickard	Paul Laidlaw	Jordan Productions		Snow Scene	
2011/2012	Beauty and the Beast	Bernie Nolan, Paul Laidlaw, Leanne Jones, Chris Clarkson, Rachel Jerram, Graham James, Simon Pontin	Chris Jordan	Jordan Productions		Magical Flying end of Act 1	
2012/2013	Robin Hood	Brian Capron, Paul Laidlaw, Tracey Penn, David Dobson, Ray Griffiths, Paul Bentley, John Alistair, Francesca Leyland	Chris Jordan	Jordan Productions		Waterfall and Rain	
2013/2014	Cinderella	Gillian Wright, Paul Laidlaw, Derek Walker, Scott Cripps, Rebecca Tyson, Rebecca Lisewski, Imogen Brooke, Graham James	Chris Jordan	Jordan Productions		Flying Horse and Carriage	
2014/2015	Aladdin	Shaun Williamson, Paul Laidlaw, Junix Inocian, Aidan O'Neill, Hannah Malekzad, CG Fraser, Micha Richardson, Christina Hoey, Adam Shorey	Chris Jordan	Jordan Productions		Laser Show	
2015/2016	Sleeping Beauty	Wendi Peters, Paul Laidlaw, Aidan O'Neill, Gregor Stewart, Daniella Piper, Nicola Bryan, Paul Bentley	Chris Jordan	Jordan Productions		CO2 Jets, Flame Projections	
2016/2017	Peter Pan	Tom Lister, Paul Laidlaw, Aidan O'Neill, Twist & Pulse, Ewan Goddard, Laura Baldwin, Amanda Coutts, Sinead Long, Amy Oxley	Chris Jordan	Jordan Productions		Water Fountains and Ball Pit	
2017/2018	Jack and the Beanstalk	Cliff Parisi, Melanie Masson, Paul Laidlaw, Aidan O'Neill, Lisa Mathieson, Victoria Farley, Sion Tudor Owen, Matt Lee-Steer	Chris Jordan	Jordan Productions		Giant Beanstalk that was climbable	
2018/2019	Snow White and the Seven Dwarfs	Hannah-Jane Fox, Matt Lapinskas, Paul Laidlaw, Aidan O'Neill, Hannah Boyce, Ray Griffiths, Lee Hill, Greg Doherty, Hayley Burroughs, Karen Anderson, Mark Sealey, James Lusted	Chris Jordan	Jordan Productions		Snow Scene	
2019/2020	Beauty and the Beast	Carli Norris, Paul Laidlaw, Aidan O'Neill, Grace Lancaster, Alex Scott-Fairley, Rebecca Vere, Neil Stewart	Chris Jordan	Jordan Productions		Auditorium Flying	
2021/2022	Aladdin	Aidan O'Neill, Stuart Nurse, Alex Wright, Steven Serlin	Chris Jordan	Jordan Productions		Water Pit and Slosh!	
2022/2023	Cinderella	Aidan O'Neill, Chris Aukett, Christian Andrews, Harriet Bunton, Tara Yasmin, Gabby Williams, Rosemary Annabella Nkrumah	Chris Jordan	Jordan Productions	£12.50 - 27.50	Flying Horse	
2023/2024	Sleeping Beauty	Aidan O'Neill, Bobby Delaney, Glenn Adamson, Emma O'Dell, Nicola Bryan, Raquel Jones, Paul Kemble	Chris Jordan	Jordan Productions	£13.50 - 29.00	Dragon, Time Machine	
2024/2025	Peter Pan	Aidan O'Neill, Steven Serlin, Mark Siney, Billy Vale, Ellie Clayton, Jenay Naima, Rebecca Lisewski, Lyndan Barclay, Alfie Harris	Chris Jordan	Jordan Productions	£14.50 - 32.00	Water Fountains, Rocking Boat and Ball Pit	
2025/2026	Dick Whittington & His Cat	Aidan O'Neill, Darren Day, Steven Serlin, Mark Siney, Matt Lapinskas, Georgie Hales, Daisy Fitzgerald, Nicola Bryan, George Harper, Charlie Haydon, Amaya Lucas, Allanah Martin-Judge	Chris Jordan	Jordan Productions	£18.00 - 33.50	Mousetrap, Underwater Projection and Performer Flying	

=== Gordon Craig Theatre Productions ===
Productions made in-house at The Gordon Craig Theatre
Opening Date	Production	Cast Included:	Director	Musical Director	Set Design	Other Creative Team Members	Refs.
16 June 1999	Noel and Gertie	Ian Lavender, Kate O'mara	Christopher Wren	Greg Arrowsmith		Bob Bustance (LX)	
3 April 2002	Pinocchio			Greg Arrowsmith			
26 August 2003	Crazy for You						
14 April 2004	Hansel and Gretel		Paul Laidlaw	Greg Arrowsmith			
24 August 2004	Titanic: The Musical		Paul Laidlaw	Chris Keen			
15 August 2005	42nd Street						
2 April 2008	Peter Pan: The Musical	Jeremy Barlow, Granville Saxton, Sarah George, Rachel Jerram	Paul Laidlaw	Peter Golding	Helga Wood	Bob Bustance (LX)Jacqueline Mason (Choreography) Luke Hyde (Sound)	
15 April 2009	Beauty and the Beast	Katie Lavelli, Wesley Hughes, Jim Welsman, Amy Bird	Paul Laidlaw	Robert Cousins	Helga Wood	Bob Bustance (LX)Jacqueline Mason (Choreography) Luke Hyde (Sound)	
14 April 2010	The Adventures of Mr Toad	Chris Nelson, James Rowntree, Matt Lee-Steer, Granville Saxton, Stuart Simons, Amy Bird, Nerys Martin, Emil Dale, Danielle Fennymore, James Williamson	Paul Laidlaw	Tom Gearing	Andy Newell	Bob Bustance (LX) Jacqueline Mason (Choreography) Dave Nott (Sound)	
16 August 2010	Guys and Dolls	Elizabeth Pruett, Bradley Clarkson, Nerys Martin, Andrew Hodson	Tracy Collier	Chris Keen	Scenic Projects	Bob Bustance (LX) Drew Varley (Choreography) Luke Hyde (Sound)	
20 April 2011	The Lion, The Witch and the Wardrobe	Kimberly Ensor, Chris Skinner, Amy Bird, James Williamson, James Rowntree, Emil Dale, Amber Wallis	Catherine Lomax	Tom Gearing	Scenic Projects	Bob Bustance (LX) Flik Swan (Choreography) Dave Nott (Sound)	
11 April 2012	Pinocchio: Gepetto's Musical Tale	Harriet Lomax, Claire Rickard, Stephan Dean, Rakesh Boury, James Franklin, Nathan Lubbock-Smith, Caroline Rodgers, Rob Paice, Michelle White	Catherine Lomax	Rob Cousins	Andy Newell	John Maddox (LX) Philip Joel (Choreography) Luke Hyde (Sound)	
16 August 2012	The Sound of Music	Natalie Blenford, Wendy-Lee Purdy, Amy Percival, Amy Bird, Michelle White, Lawrence Stubbins, Kim Taylforth, Matthew Waters	Catherine Lomax	Chris Keen	Scenic Projects	John Maddox (LX) Khiley Williams (Choreography) Luke Hyde (Sound)	
18 October 2012	Woman in Mind	Chris Clarkson, Angie Smith, Tim Heath, Ian Houghton	Catherine Lomax		Michael Humphries	Ben Locke (LX) Phil Nunnington (Sound)	
11 April 2013	Peter Pan	Amy Bird, Grace Lewis, David Haydn, Sarah Lawn, Martyn Payne	Catherine Lomax	Phil Dennis	Andy Newell	John Maddox (LX)Khiley Williams (Choreography) Luke Hyde (Sound)	
22 August 2013	Fame	Ricardo Castro, Brett Nelson, Matt Lee Steer, Kimberley Ensor, Cris Blackham	Catherine Lomax	Chris Keen	Andy Newell	John Maddox (LX) Khiley Williams (Choreography) Luke Hyde (Sound)	
16 April 2014	James and the Giant Peach	Louisa Roberts, Olivia Holland-Rose, Ryan Owen, Caroline Rodgers, Laura Crowhurst	Catherine Lomax	Robert Cousins	Andy Newell	Pete Kramer (LX) Khiley Williams (Choreography) Luke Hyde (Sound) Lisa Hickey (Costume)	
18 August 2014	Hairspray	Francesca Fenech, Linda John-Pierre, Simon Anthony, Daniel Page	Catherine Lomax	Chris Keen	Scenic Projects	Pete Kramer (LX)Khiley Williams (Choreography) Luke Hyde (Sound) Lisa Hickey (Costume)	
15 April 2015	Charlotte's Web	Harriet Payne, Cameron Leigh, Will Brechin	Catherine Lomax	Phil Dennis	Andy Newell	Pete Kramer (LX) Khiley Williams (Choreography) Luke Hyde (Sound) Lisa Hickey (Costume)	
18 August 2015	Sister Act	Michelle Chantelle Hopewell, Arthur Bostrom, Pippa Winslow	Catherine Lomax	Chris Keen	Scenic Projects	Pete Kramer (LX) Khiley Williams (Choreography) Luke Hyde (Sound) Lisa Hickey (Costume)	
21 October 2015	Moonlight and Magnolias	Mark Little, Alexis Caley	Catherine Lomax		Al Rivers		
24 March 2016	Alice in Wonderland	Thomas Sutcliffe, Natasha Karp, Abbie Chambers	Catherine Lomax	Phil Dennis	Andy Newell	Pete Kramer (LX) Khiley Williams (Choreography) Luke Hyde (Sound) Lisa Hickey (Costume)	
17 August 2016	Singin in the Rain	Mike Denman, Katie Warsop, Craig Armstrong	Catherine Lomax	Chris Keen	UK Productions	Pete Kramer (LX) Khiley Williams (Choreography) Luke Hyde (Sound) Lisa Hickey (Costume)	
5 October 2016	Bedroom Farce	Caroline Rodgers, Chris Aukett, Ben Roddy, Paul Lavers	Catherine Lomax		Al Rivers		
13 April 2017	Rapunzel	Samantha Noel, Cameron Leigh, James Donovan, Julie Stark	Catherine Lomax	Phil Dennis	Andy Newell	Pete Kramer (LX) Khiley Williams (Choreography) Luke Hyde (Sound) Lisa Hickey (Costume)	
29 August 2017	The Producers	Ali Bastian, Paul Easom, Ryan Owen, Oliver Stanley, Daniel Page, Phil Joel	Catherine Lomax	Phil Dennis	Scenic Projects	Pete Kramer (LX) Khiley Williams (Choreography) Luke Hyde (Sound) Lisa Hickey (Costume)	
1 November 2017	Up 'n' Under	Gemma Oaten	Ben Roddy		Connor Norris	Dawn Meadowcroft (LX)	
1 April 2018	Sleeping Beauty		Catherine Lomax	Phil Dennis	Connor Norris	Pete Kramer (LX) Khiley Williams (Choreography) Luke Hyde (Sound) Lisa Hickey (Costume)	
9 May 2018	Neighbourhood Watch	Victoria Fitz-Gerald, Catherine McDonough, Paul Lavers	Catherine Lomax				
28 August 2018	Oklahoma		Catherine Lomax	Robert Scott	Scenic Projects	Pete Kramer (LX) Khiley Williams (Choreography) Luke Hyde (Sound) Lisa Hickey (Costume)	
2 August 2022	Little Shop of Horrors(Co-Production withOutside the Box Productions)	Cameron Neale, Daisy Amphlett, Connor Daly, Toby Boutall, Ellie Muir, Taylor Crampton, Pippa Williams	Alison Kaby	Jonny Gibson-Smith	Scenic Projects	Matt Carney (LX)Emily Cusden (Choreography) Joe Leggett (Sound) Amber Botteley (Costume) Amy Ellis-Hall (DSM on the Book)	

=== Visiting Amateur Groups ===
The Gordon Craig Theatre was conceived by the local authority to provide amenities for Stevenage residents. It was built to a specification to allow use by large amateur operatic and dramatic societies with elaborate productions. Its design architect, Ray Gorbing, was an avid member of local group The Stevenage Lytton Players. Many local schools, colleges, dance, theatre, music, religious and Scouts groups have performed on the Gordon Craig Theatre's stage as well as these notable visiting groups:

- The Stevenage Lytton Players
- Letchworth Arcadians
- Hitchin Thespians
- Luton Amateur Operatic & Dramatic Society
- Broadhall Players
- Stevenage Symphony Orchestra
- North Herts Music School
- Stevenage Ladies Choir
- Stevenage Male Voice Choir

=== The English Sinfonia ===
The English Sinfonia was an orchestra who made the Gordon Craig Theatre their home in 1997. To celebrate the residency, they commissioned Michael Nyman to write Strong on Oaks, Strong on the Causes of Oaks, a five-movement orchestral work taking its name from the Anglo-Saxon name of the town, "Sithenaece" meaning "Strong on Oaks". The English Sinfonia's conductors, leaders and soloists at the Gordon Craig Theatre included Bramwell Tovey, Janice Graham, Nicolae Moldoveanu, John Lill, John Farrer, Julian Lloyd Webber and Evelyn Glennie. The residency at the Gordon Craig Theatre ended in 2006.

=== Saturday Mornings 1975–1993 ===
Saturday Morning shows for children were an integral part of the Gordon Craig programme in the theatre's early years. Jack Mayes lived and performed in the town and was a popular Stevenage personality, performing alongside his puppet Hairy Harry as "the almost famous Jack Mayes". His shows ran from 1975 until 1993, when he finally called it a day at The Gordon Craig Theatre.

== Organ ==
The theatre houses a still playable 1932 Christie theatre organ, which was installed in 1987 after originally being in the Carlton cinema, Tuebrook, Liverpool. The re-homed Christie had its Grand Opening Concert at the Gordon Craig Theatre at 3:00pm on Sunday 27 September 1987. Five organists performed that afternoon; Frank Fowler (Managing Director of Hill Norman & Beard), George Blackmore, Joanna Fraser, Janet Dowsett and finally William Davies. The console for the organ can be played in the orchestra pit or brought onto the stage.

The Christie Organ will be returning to the stage for the first time after a very long break, on 15 September 2022, and continues to play to audiences regularly, in association with the Cannock Chase Organ Club
