= Undisputed British Cruiserweight Championship =

Professional wrestling championship

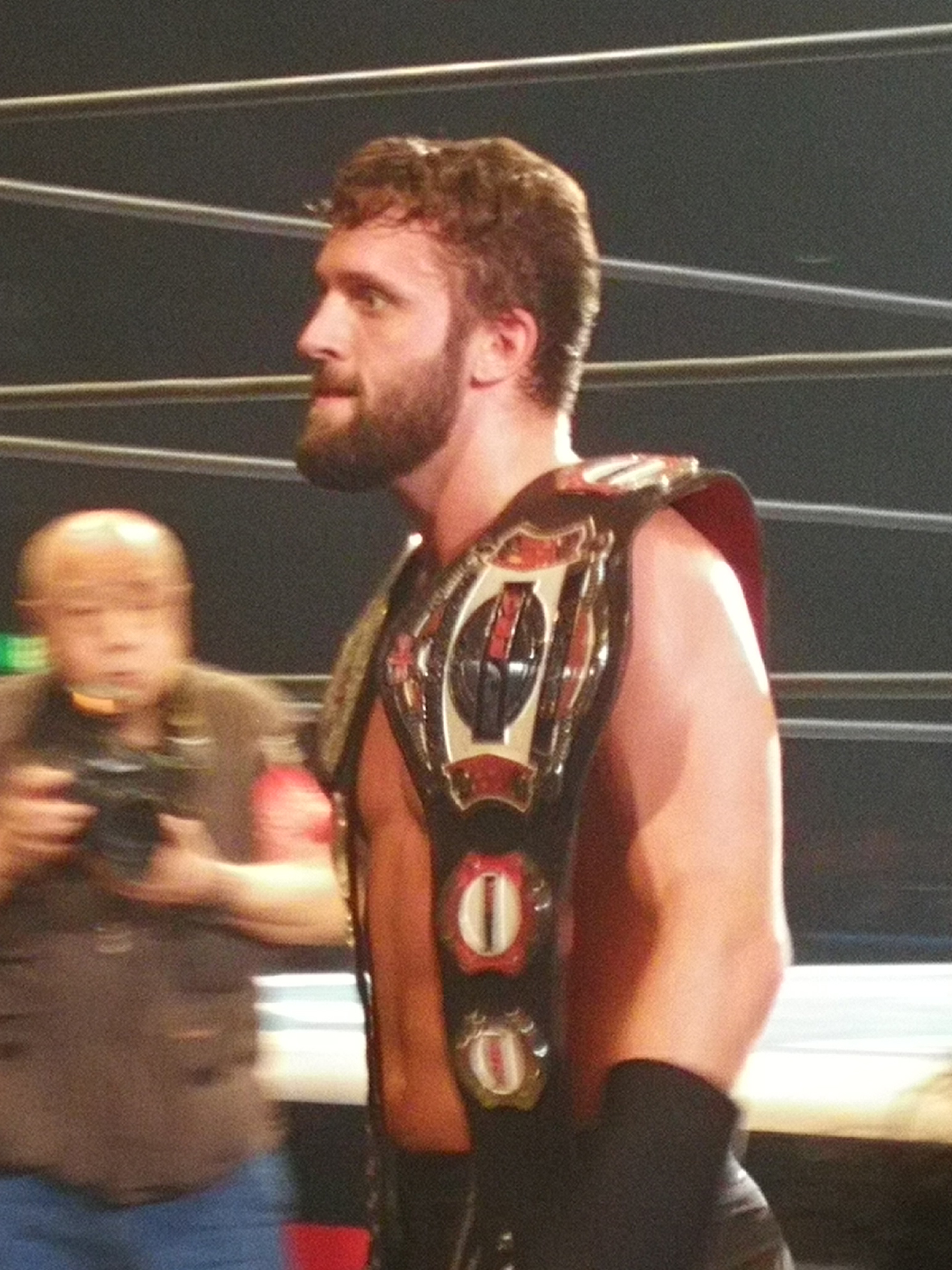
- El Phantasmo with the title in November 2019.

Details
- Promotion: Revolution Pro Wrestling
- Date established: December 6, 2008
- Current champion: Cameron Khai
- Date won: October 17, 2026

Other names
- RQW Cruiserweight Championship (2007–2008); IPW:UK British Cruiserweight Championship (2008–2012); British Cruiserweight Championship (2012–2017); Undisputed British Cruiserweight Championship (2017–present)
Statistics
- First champion: Mark Haskins
- Most reigns: Josh Bodom (3 reigns)
- Longest reign: Michael Oku (890 days)
- Shortest reign: Andrew Everett (2 days)
- Youngest champion: Leon Slater (19 years, 80 days)

The Undisputed British Cruiserweight Championship is a professional wrestling championship owned by the Revolution Pro Wrestling (RevPro/RPW) promotion. The title was created and debuted on 6 December 2008. The current champion is Cameron Khai, who is in his first reign. He won the vacant title by defeating Titán in a tournament final on Show 2 of Fantastica Mania UK on October 17, 2026. Previous champion Leyton Buzzard vacated the title due to suffering an ACL injury.

== Title history ==
As of 10 November 2026, there have been a total of 30 reigns shared between 25 different champions, with three vacancies as well as one interim champion. Mark Haskins was the inaugural champion. Josh Bodom has the most reigns at three and also served as the interim champion in early-2017 while until reigning lineal champion Will Ospreay returned from Japan (this is not counted as one of Bodom's three reigns). Michael Oku's reign is the longest at 890 days, while Andrew Everett's reign is the shortest at 2 days.

Cameron Khai is the current champion in his first reign. He won the vacant title by defeating Titán on Show 2 of Fantastica Mania UK in Wolverhampton, England, on October 17, 2026. Previous champion Leyton Buzzard vacated the title due to suffering an ACL injury.

=== Reigns ===
Key
| No. | Overall reign number |
| Reign | Reign number for the specific champion |
| Days | Number of days held |
| + | Current reign is changing daily |

| No. | Champion | Championship change | | | Reign statistics | | Notes | Ref. |
| No. | Champion | Date | Event | Location | Reign | Days | Notes | Ref. |
|---|---|---|---|---|---|---|---|---|
RQW
| 1 | Mark Haskins | 6 December 2008 | IWW | Enniscorthy, County Wexford, Ireland | 1 | 123 | Haskins, the-then RQW Cruiserweight Champion, is recognized as the first British Cruiserweight Champion. | |
| 2 | The British Eagle | 8 April 2009 | IPW:UK | Selsey, West Sussex, England | 1 | 7 | | |
IPW:UK
| 3 | Mark Haskins | 15 April 2009 | Live In Selsey | Selsey, West Sussex, England | 2 | 221 | | |
| 4 | The Lion Kid | 22 November 2009 | Brawl At The Hall | Sittingbourne, Kent, England | 2 | 196 | Kid formerly known as The British Eagle. | |
| 5 | Rockstar Spud | 6 June 2010 | Unfinished Business | Sittingbourne, Kent, England | 1 | 315 | | |
| — | Vacated | 17 April 2011 | — | — | — | — | Spud vacated the title due to inactivity. | |
| 6 | Marty Scurll | 28 April 2012 | Revolution | London, England | 1 | 202 | Scurll defeated Sami Callihan in the tournament final to win the vacant title. | |
RevPro
| 7 | Prince Devitt | 16 November 2012 | St Ives Debut | St Ives, Cambridgeshire, England | 1 | 540 | | |
| 8 | Josh Bodom | 10 May 2014 | Make or Break | Birmingham, West Midlands, England | 1 | 162 | | |
| 9 | Will Ospreay | 19 October 2014 | Okada Vs. Aries | Clapham, London, England | 1 | 321 | This was a triple threat match, which also involving Rich Swann. | |
| 10 | Josh Bodom | 5 September 2015 | RevPro | Marylebone, Greater London, England | 2 | 50 | | |
| 11 | Andrew Everett | 25 October 2015 | Live In Sittingbourne | Sittingbourne, Kent, England | 1 | 2 | | |
| — | Vacated | 27 October 2015 | — | — | — | — | Andrew Everett had to vacate the title due to injury. | |
| 12 | Pete Dunne | 3 January 2016 | Live At The Cockpit | Marylebone, Greater London, England | 1 | 189 | Defeated Morgan Webster in a tournament final to win the vacant title. | |
| 13 | Will Ospreay | 10 July 2016 | Summer Sizzler | Bethnal Green, Greater London, England | 2 | 277 | | |
| — | Josh Bodom (interim) | 21 January 2017 | High Stakes | Bethnal Green, Greater London, England | - | 82 | Bodom defeated Ryan Smile to become the interim champion until Ospreay had returned from Japan. | |
| 14 | Josh Bodom | 13 April 2017 | Epic Encounter | Bethnal Green, Greater London, England | 3 | 210 | | |
| 15 | Ryan Smile | 9 November 2017 | RevPro/NJPW Global Wars; Night 1 | Bethnal Green, Greater London, England | 1 | 24 | This was a three-way match, also involving Bushi. | |
| 16 | Flash Morgan Webster | 3 December 2017 | Live At The Cockpit | Marylebone, Greater London, England | 1 | 5 | | |
| 17 | Kurtis Chapman | 8 December 2017 | Uprising | Bethnal Green, Greater London, England | 1 | 154 | Chapman pinned David Starr in a five-man scramble match, which also involving Flash Morgan Webster and El Phantasmo. | |
| 18 | David Starr | 11 May 2018 | Epic Encounter | Bethnal Green, Greater London, England | 1 | 364 | | |
| 19 | El Phantasmo | 10 May 2019 | Epic Encounter | Bethnal Green, Greater London, England | 1 | 280 | This was a Ladder match. | |
| 20 | Michael Oku | 14 February 2020 | High Stakes | York Hall, London, England | 1 | 890 | On September 13, 2020 at Epic Encounters 2, Oku defeated Ricky Knight Jr. to unify the title with the Southside Speed King Championship. | |
| 21 | Luke Jacobs | 23 July 2022 | Summer Sizzler | Manchester, England | 1 | 147 | | |
| 22 | Robbie X | 17 December 2022 | Uprising | London, England | 1 | 204 | | |
| 23 | Connor Mills | 9 July 2023 | Epic Encounter 2023 | London, England | 1 | 160 | | |
| 24 | Leon Slater | 16 December 2023 | Uprising 2023 | London, England | 1 | 78 | | |
| 24 | Jordon Breaks | 3 March 2024 | Live in London 83 | London, England | 1 | 77 | | |
| 25 | Neón | 19 May 2024 | Fantastica Mania: UK | London, England | 1 | 97 | | |
| 26 | Will Kaven | 24 August 2024 | RevPro 12th Anniversary Show | London, England | 1 | 302 | This was a six-way match also involving Cameron Khai, El Phantasmo, Leon Slater and Dante Martin. | |
| 27 | Nino Bryant | 22 June 2025 | RevPro Revolution Rumble 2025 | London, England | 1 | 168 | | |
| 28 | Joe Lando | 7 December 2025 | Live in London 102 | London, England | 1 | 161 | | |
| 29 | Leyton Buzzard | 17 May 2026 | Revolution Rumble | Doncaster, England | 1 | 153 | | |
| — | Vacated | 17 October 2026 | Fantastica Mania UK; Show 1 | — | — | — | Leyton Buzzard officially vacated the title due to suffering a torn ACL. | |
| 30 | Cameron Khai | 17 October 2026 | Fantastica Mania UK; Show 2 | Wolverhampton, England | 1 | 24+ | Defeated Titán in a tournament final to win the vacant title. | |

== Combined reigns ==
As of November 10, 2026.

| † | Indicates the current champion |

| Rank | Wrestler | No. of reigns | Combined Days |
|---|---|---|---|
| 1 | Michael Oku | 1 | 890 |
| 2 | Will Ospreay | 2 | 598 |
| 3 | Prince Devitt | 1 | 540 |
| 4 | Josh Bodom | 1 | 422 |
| 5 | David Starr | 1 | 364 |
| 6 | Mark Haskins | 2 | 344 |
| 7 | Rockstar Spud | 1 | 315 |
| 8 | Will Kaven | 1 | 302 |
| 9 | El Phantasmo | 1 | 280 |
| 10 | Robbie X | 1 | 204 |
| 11 | The British Eagle/Lion Kid | 2 | 203 |
| 12 | Marty Scurll | 1 | 202 |
| 13 | Pete Dunne | 1 | 189 |
| 14 | Nino Bryant | 1 | 168 |
| 15 | Joe Lando | 1 | 161 |
| 16 | Connor Mills | 1 | 160 |
| 17 | Kurtis Chapman | 1 | 154 |
| 18 | Leyton Buzzard | 1 | 153 |
| 19 | Luke Jacobs | 1 | 147 |
| 20 | Neón | 1 | 97 |
| 21 | Leon Slater | 1 | 78 |
| 22 | Jordon Breaks | 1 | 77 |
| 23 | Cameron Khai † | 1 | 24+ |
| 24 | Ryan Smile | 1 | 24 |
| 25 | Flash Morgan Webster | 1 | 5 |
| 26 | Andrew Everett | 1 | 2 |

== See also ==
- Professional wrestling in the United Kingdom
- RPW British Heavyweight Championship
- RPW Undisputed British Tag Team Championship
