= Capital Collision (2024) =

2024 New Japan Pro-Wrestling professional wrestling event

- Promotional poster featuring various wrestlers
- Promotion: New Japan Pro-Wrestling
- Brand: NJPW Strong
- Date: August 30, 2024
- City: Washington, D.C.
- Venue: Entertainment and Sports Arena
- Attendance: 2,266

Event chronology
← Previous; G1 Climax 34	Next → Destruction in Kobe

Capital Collision chronology
← Previous; 2023	Next → —

Capital Collision (2024) was a professional wrestling event produced by New Japan Pro-Wrestling (NJPW). It took place on August 30, 2024, at the Entertainment and Sports Arena in Washington, D.C. This was the third event to be held under the Capital Collision name.

== Production ==
=== Background ===
Capital Collision is an annual professional wrestling event produced by New Japan Pro-Wrestling (NJPW). Since its inception, it is held annually at Washington, D.C.'s Entertainment and Sports Arena. The inaugural Capital Collision took place on May 14, 2022. The second Capital Collision took place on April 15, 2023, thus establishing Capital Collision as an annual event. On April 12, 2024, it was announced that the third Capital Collision would take place on August 30, 2024.

=== Storylines ===
Capital Collision featured professional wrestling matches that involved different wrestlers from pre-existing scripted feuds and storylines. Wrestlers portrayed villains, heroes, or less distinguishable characters in the scripted events that built tension and culminate in a wrestling match or series of matches.

== Results ==
No.	Results	Stipulations	Times
1^{P}	Matt Vandagriff defeated Allan Breeze by pinfall	Strong Survivor match	6:22
2^{P}	Empress Nexus Venus (Hanako and Mina Shirakawa) defeated Trish Adora and Viva Van by submission	Tag team match	6:55
3	Tomohiro Ishii and Hiroshi Tanahashi defeated Grizzled Young Veterans (James Drake and Zack Gibson) and TMDK (Bad Dude Tito and Robbie Eagles) by pinfall	Three-way tag team match to determine the #1 contenders to the Strong Openweight Tag Team Championship	11:25
4	Rocky Romero, Yoshi-Hashi and Kevin Knight defeated Bullet Club War Dogs (David Finlay, Clark Connors and Drilla Moloney) by pinfall	Six-man tag team match	11:52
5	Dirty Work (Tom Lawlor and Fred Rosser) defeated West Coast Wrecking Crew (Royce Isaacs and Jorel Nelson) by pinfall	No Disqualification tag team match	11:38
6	Zack Sabre Jr. defeated Titán by submission	Singles match	14:53
7	Tetsuya Naito defeated TJP by pinfall	Singles match	14:59
8	TMDK (Mikey Nicholls and Shane Haste) (c) defeated Hechicero and Virus by pinfall	Tag team match for the Strong Openweight Tag Team Championship	13:53
9	Hiromu Takahashi defeated Mustafa Ali by pinfall	Singles match Had Hiromu lost, he would have publicly said that Ali is the best junior heavyweight wrestler in the world.	17:20
10	Gabe Kidd (c) defeated Lio Rush by pinfall	Singles match for the Strong Openweight Championship	17:55
11	Mercedes Moné (c) defeated Momo Watanabe by submission	Singles match for the Strong Women's Championship	19:55
(c) / – the champion(s) heading into the match; P / – the match was broadcast on the pre-show
