= Mighty =

Mighty may refer to:

== Businesses ==
- Mighty Audio, an American company known for its product Mighty, a portable audio player
- Mighty Animation, an animation studio based in Guadalajara, Mexico

== Films ==
- The Mighty, a 1998 comedy–drama
- The Mighty (1929 film), a 1929 action movie

== Music ==
- Mighty (The Planet Smashers album)
- Mighty (Kristene DiMarco album)
- "Mighty" (featuring JFTH), a song by Caravan Palace from <|°_°|> (also known as Robot Face or Robot)

== Other uses in arts and entertainment ==
- The Mighty (comics), a DC Comics title
- The Mighty (professional wrestling), an Australian WWE tag team
- Mighty the Armadillo, a character in the Sonic the Hedgehog game series
- Samira Mighty (born 1996), an English television personality and actress

== See also ==
- Might (disambiguation)
- Mighty Atom (disambiguation)
- Almighty (disambiguation)
