= Capital Collision (2023) =

2023 New Japan Pro-Wrestling professional wrestling event

- Promotional poster featuring Sanada, Kazuchika Okada, Will Ospreay, Tetsuya Naito and Hiromu Takahashi
- Promotion: New Japan Pro-Wrestling
- Brand: NJPW Strong
- Date: April 15, 2023
- City: Washington, D.C.
- Venue: Entertainment and Sports Arena
- Attendance: 2,179

Event chronology
← Previous; Sakura Genesis	Next → Wrestling Satsuma no Kuni; Wrestling Dontaku 2023

Capital Collision chronology
← Previous; 2022	Next → 2024

Capital Collision (2023) was a professional wrestling event produced by New Japan Pro-Wrestling (NJPW). It took place on April 15, 2023, at the Entertainment and Sports Arena in Washington, D.C. Wrestlers from NJPW's partner promotions, All Elite Wrestling (AEW) and Impact Wrestling, also appeared on the card. This was the second event to be held under the Capital Collision name.

Nine matches were contested at the event, including one on the pre-show. In the main event, Aussie Open (Mark Davis and Kyle Fletcher) defeated defending champions the Motor City Machine Guns (Chris Sabin and Alex Shelley) and the Dream Team (Kazuchika Okada and Hiroshi Tanahashi) to win the Strong Openweight Tag Team Championship. In another prominent match, Kenta successfully defended the Strong Openweight Championship against Eddie Edwards.

== Production ==
=== Background ===
In October 2019, NJPW announced their expansion into the United States with their new American division, New Japan Pro-Wrestling of America (NJoA). On July 31, 2020, NJPW announced a new weekly series titled NJPW Strong; the series would be produced by NJoA. On January 30, 2023, NJPW announced that all of the promotion's future American events would be branded under the "Strong" name. Beginning with Battle in the Valley on February 18, the NJoA PPVs began airing as NJPW Strong Live; these PPV events will later air on NJPW World as part of the NJPW Strong on Demand series.

=== Storylines ===
Capital Collision featured professional wrestling matches that involved different wrestlers from pre-existing scripted feuds and storylines. Wrestlers portrayed villains, heroes, or less distinguishable characters in the scripted events that built tension and culminated in a wrestling match or series of matches.

== Event ==
=== Pre-show ===
The pre-show saw Shane Haste and Bad Dude Tito of TMDK defeat Royce Isaacs and Jorel Nelson of Team Filthy.

=== Preliminary matches ===
The opening match saw the team of Volador Jr., Mike Bailey, Kushida, Kevin Knight and Gabriel Kidd defeat the team of Rocky Romero, Chuck Taylor, Lio Rush, Clark Connors and The DKC. After the match Connors attacked teammate The DKC.

In the next match, AR Fox faced David Finlay. During the match Finlay would perform Black Thunder Bomb on Fox to get a near fall, Finlay would attempt to hit Trash Panda only for Fox to counter it with a Fire Thunder. Finlay would eventually win the match after successfully hitting Trash Panda on Fox. After the match Finlay called out Connors and offered him to join Bullet Club which Connor accepted.

Next saw Zack Sabre Jr. defended the NJPW World Television Championship against Tom Lawlor, which was Sabre retain by forcing Lawlor to submit.

The next match saw Tomohiro Ishii defeat El Desperado after a brain buster.

Juice Robinson and Fred Rosser was original scheduled to have match although was called as a no contest by the referee as Robinson attacked Rosser before the match started.

Next, saw IWGP World Heavyweight Champion Sanada and fellow Just 5 Guys stablemate Yoshinobu Kanemaru defeat Los Ingobernables de Japón's Tetsuya Naito and Hiromu Takahashi in a tag team match.

In the next match which saw Kenta defeat Eddie Edwards to retain the NJPW Strong Openweight Championship after hitting the Go2Sleep. In the post-match, Hikuleo would challenge Kenta for the title via a pre-recorded video.

=== Main event ===
The main event saw the Motor City Machine Guns defend the Strong Openweight Tag Team Championship against Aussie Open and the Dream Team of Kazuchika Okada and Hiroshi Tanahashi with Aussie Open winning the match and becoming double tag team champions, holding both the Strong Openweight Tag Team Championship and IWGP Tag Team Championship.

== Results ==
No.	Results	Stipulations	Times
1^{P}	TMDK (Shane Haste and Bad Dude Tito) defeated Team Filthy (Royce Isaacs and Jorel Nelson)	Tag team match	8:31
2	Volador Jr., Jet Setters (Kushida and Kevin Knight), Mike Bailey and Gabriel Kidd defeated Chaos (Rocky Romero, Chuck Taylor and Lio Rush), Clark Connors and The DKC	Ten-man tag team match	10:18
3	David Finlay defeated AR Fox	Singles match	10:28
4	Zack Sabre Jr. (c) defeated Tom Lawlor	Singles match for the NJPW World Television Championship	13:12
5	Tomohiro Ishii defeated El Desperado	Singles match	16:40
6	Fred Rosser vs. Juice Robinson ended in a no contest	Singles match	—
7	Just 5 Guys (Sanada and Yoshinobu Kanemaru) defeated Los Ingobernables de Japón (Tetsuya Naito and Hiromu Takahashi)	Tag team match	16:40
8	Kenta (c) defeated Eddie Edwards	Singles match for the Strong Openweight Championship	18:42
9	Aussie Open (Mark Davis and Kyle Fletcher) defeated Motor City Machine Guns (Chris Sabin and Alex Shelley) (c) and Dream Team (Kazuchika Okada and Hiroshi Tanahashi)	Three-way tag team match for the Strong Openweight Tag Team Championship	25:13
(c) / – the champion(s) heading into the match; P / – the match was broadcast on the pre-show

== Aftermath ==
On the following day, NJPW suspended Juice Robinson for attacking Fred Rosser before the match. As the result of the suspension, Rosser was made as Robinson's replacement in the number one contender tournament for the IWGP United States Heavyweight Championship which Robinson was scheduled to face Lance Archer at Collision in Philadelphia, later that day. Archer would defeat Rosser to advance to the finals and face the winner of Hiroshi Tanahashi vs. Will Ospreay at Dominion 6.4 at Osaka-jo Hall.

During the main event, Tanahashi suffered a rib injury which resulted in Tanahashi being removed from Collision In Philadelphia's card as he was scheduled to team up with Chaos's Tomohiro Ishii and Lio Rush to take on United Empire's Aussie Open and TJP.
