= Mite (disambiguation) =

Mites are microscopic arachnid animals.

Mite may also refer to:

== Arts and entertainment ==
- Mite (album), 1988, by Chisato Moritaka
- Mite (Dungeons & Dragons), a character in the role-playing games

== Education ==
- Mangalore Institute of Technology & Engineering, Karnataka, India
- Minority Introduction to Engineering and Science, a program at the Massachusetts Institute of Technology, U.S.

== People ==
- Mite Cikarski, Macedonian footballer
- Mite Kremnitz, German writer

== Other uses ==
- River Mite, Cumbria, England
- The Greek lepton, a small coin translated as "mite" in various passages of the Bible
- Miniature Inverted-repeat Transposable Elements, non-self-replicating DNA strands
- Mooney M-18 Mite, a 1947 model of one-man aircraft

== See also ==
- Might (disambiguation)
- Mate (disambiguation)
- Meet (disambiguation)
- Mitre (disambiguation)
- Mitt (disambiguation)
- Tick (disambiguation)
