= Capital Collision (2022) =

2022 New Japan Pro-Wrestling professional wrestling event

- Promotion: New Japan Pro-Wrestling
- Date: May 14, 2022
- City: Washington, D.C.
- Venue: Entertainment and Sports Arena
- Attendance: 2,641

Event chronology
← Previous; Wrestling Dontaku	Next → Best of the Super Jr. 29; Dominion 6.12 in Osaka-jo Hall

Capital Collision chronology
← Previous; First	Next → 2023

Capital Collision was a professional wrestling event produced by New Japan Pro-Wrestling (NJPW). It took place on May 14, 2022, at the Entertainment and Sports Arena in Washington, D.C. Wrestlers from NJPW's U.S. partner promotion All Elite Wrestling (AEW) appeared on the card. This was the first event to be held under the Capital Collision name.

== Storylines ==
Capital Collision featured professional wrestling matches that involved different wrestlers from pre-existing scripted feuds and storylines. Wrestlers portrayed villains, heroes, or less distinguishable characters in the scripted events that built tension and culminated in a wrestling match or series of matches.

== Results ==
No.	Results	Stipulations	Times
1^{D}	Nick Comoroto defeated Kevin Knight by pinfall	Singles match	6:26
2	Karl Fredericks defeated Ren Narita by pinfall	Singles match	10:32
3	Team Filthy (Tom Lawlor, Jorel Nelson, Royce Isaacs, J.R. Kratos, and Danny Limelight) defeated The DKC, Yuya Uemura, David Finlay, Tanga Loa, and Fred Rosser by pinfall	Ten-man tag team match	14:48
4	Chase Owens defeated Great-O-Khan by pinfall	Singles match	8:46
5	TMDK (Mikey Nicholls, Shane Haste, Jonah, and Bad Dude Tito) defeated United Empire (Aaron Henare, Kyle Fletcher, Mark Davis, and Jeff Cobb) by pinfall	Eight-man tag team match	12:09
6	Brody King defeated Minoru Suzuki by pinfall	Singles match	9:05
7	Tomohiro Ishii defeated Eddie Kingston by pinfall	Singles match	16:07
8	Bullet Club (Jay White and Hikuleo) defeated Chaos (Kazuchika Okada and Rocky Romero) by pinfall	Tag team match	15:59
9	Juice Robinson defeated Hiroshi Tanahashi (c), Will Ospreay, and Jon Moxley by pinfall	Four-way match for the IWGP United States Heavyweight Championship	15:45
(c) / – the champion(s) heading into the match; D / – this was a dark match
