= Destruction in Kobe (2024) =

2024 New Japan Pro-Wrestling event

- Promotional poster
- Promotion: New Japan Pro-Wrestling
- Date: September 29, 2024
- City: Kobe, Japan
- Venue: Kobe World Memorial Hall
- Attendance: 4,528

Event chronology
← Previous; Capital Collision	Next → King of Pro-Wrestling

Destruction chronology
← Previous; Ryōgoku (2023)	Next → Kobe (2025)

Destruction in Kobe (2024) was a professional wrestling event promoted by New Japan Pro-Wrestling (NJPW) and took place at Kobe World Memorial Hall in Kobe, Japan on September 29, 2024. It was the twenty-sixth event in the Destruction chronology.

== Production ==
=== Background ===
2024 is the first time since 2013 in which NJPW hold one event under the Destruction name. From 2007 to 2013, NJPW held one event per year, expanding to two shows in 2014 and to three shows in 2016.

=== Storylines ===
Destruction in Kobe featured professional wrestling matches that will involve different wrestlers from pre-existing scripted feuds and storylines. Wrestlers portrayed villains, heroes, or less distinguishable characters in the scripted events that built tension and culminated in a wrestling match or series of matches.

On Night 15 of G1 Climax 34, Great-O-Khan defeated IWGP World Heavyweight Champion Tetsuya Naito to advance to the quarterfinals, O-Khan would later fail to advance to semifinals. After a multi-man tag team match between Los Ingobernables de Japón and United Empire on Night 16, which United Empire would win, O-Khan posed with the IWGP World Heavyweight title. A IWGP World Heavyweight title match between Naito and O-Khan was set for Destruction in Kobe.

On the final night of the G1 Climax, Yoshi-Hashi would pin the IWGP Global Heavyweight Champion David Finlay in a 6-man tag team match. It was announced that Finlay will defend the IWGP Global Heavyweight Championship against Yoshi-Hashi in Kobe.

== Results ==
No.	Results	Stipulations	Times
1	Ryusuke Taguchi, Dragon Dia and Shota Umino defeated Yuji Nagata, Tomoaki Honma and Tiger Mask by pinfall	Six-man tag team match	7:24
2	Los Ingobernables de Japón (Yota Tsuji, Bushi and Hiromu Takahashi) defeated United Empire (Jeff Cobb, Callum Newman and Francesco Akira) by submission	Six-man tag team match	7:24
3	Hirooki Goto vs. Gabe Kidd ended in a double countout	Singles match	2:00
4	Hirooki Goto defeated Gabe Kidd by pinfall	No Disqualification match	10:57
5	TMDK (Zack Sabre Jr., Kosei Fujita and Ryohei Oiwa) defeated Just 5 Guys (Sanada, Taichi and Taka Michinoku) by pinfall	Six-man tag team match	6:30
6	Hiroshi Tanahashi, Toru Yano and Oleg Boltin (c) defeated House of Torture (Evil, Sho and Yujiro Takahashi) (with Dick Togo) by pinfall	Six-man tag team match for the NEVER Openweight 6-Man Tag Team Championship	11:19
7	Douki (c) defeated Yoshinobu Kanemaru by pinfall	Singles match for the IWGP Junior Heavyweight Championship	20:12
8	Shingo Takagi defeated Henare (c) by pinfall	Singles match for the NEVER Openweight Championship	19:24
9	David Finlay (c) (with Gedo) defeated Yoshi-Hashi by pinfall	Singles match for the IWGP Global Heavyweight Championship	21:37
10	Tetsuya Naito (c) defeated Great-O-Khan by pinfall	Singles match for the IWGP World Heavyweight Championship	30:44
(c) / – the champion(s) heading into the match
