= Meet =

Meet may refer to:

== People with the name ==
- Janek Meet (born 1974), Estonian footballer
- Meet Mukhi (born 2005), Indian child actor

== Arts, entertainment, and media ==
- Meet (TV series), an Australian television series
- Meet: Badlegi Duniya Ki Reet, an Indian television series
- Meet Bros, music director duo from Gwalior
- "Meet", an episode of Heartstopper

== Convention or meeting ==
- Track meet, a competitive event in track and field athletics
  - All-comers track meet, usually small local track and field competitions
- Swap meet (or flea market), a type of bazaar that rents or provides space to people who want to sell or barter merchandise
- Train meet, a railroad term referring to the event of the meeting of two trains
- Google Meet, a video communication service developed by Google

== Other uses ==
- Meet (mathematics), the greatest lower bound of a subset
- Middle East Entrepreneurs of Tomorrow (MEET), a program that brings together young Palestinian and Israeli leaders through technology and entrepreneurship

== See also ==
- Meat (disambiguation)
- Meeting (disambiguation)
