= Almighty =

Almighty may refer to:

== Religion and philosophy ==
- Omnipotence, the quality of having unlimited power and potential
- '"God Almighty", one of the names for God in the Abrahamic religions.

== People and organizations ==
- Almighty (rapper), a Cuban/Puerto Rican raised Latin trap rapper and singer
- Almighty Saints, a street gang active in Chicago

== Music ==
- The Almighty (band), a Scottish rock band formed in 1988
  - The Almighty (album), a 2000 self-titled album by The Almighty
- "Almighty", a song by Gunna from his 2018 mixtape Drip Season 3
- Almighty Defenders, a German gospel band formed in 2009
- Almighty Records Ltd, a Hi-NRG remix and music producing company based in London, UK

== Other uses ==
- Almighty (Oh My Goddess!), a character in the manga and anime series Oh My Goddess!
- Almighty dollar, an idiom often used to satirize an obsession for material wealth, or with capitalism in general

== See also ==
- Mighty (disambiguation)
