= Might =

Might or MIGHT may refer to:

- Power (social and political)
- might, an epistemic modal verb in English

== Arts and entertainment ==
- Might (magazine), an American satirical periodical (1994–1997)
- Might!, a 1995 noise music album by Boyd Rice ("NON") based on the book Might is Right
- "Might", a song on Modest Mouse's 1996 album This Is a Long Drive for Someone with Nothing to Think About

== Other uses ==
- USS Might (PG-94), an American gunboat
- Malaysian Industry Government Group for High Technology, a tech think tank

== See also ==
- Mighty (disambiguation)
- Might makes right, an aphorism on morality
- Mite (disambiguation)
