= The Meeting =

The Meeting may refer to:

- La rencontre (The Meeting) nicknamed Bonjour, Monsieur Courbet, an 1854 painting by Gustave Courbet
- The Meeting (Jackie McLean album), 1973 featuring Dexter Gordon
- The Meeting (1984 film), a Soviet animated short film
- The Meeting (Patrice Rushen album), 1990
- The Meeting (Art Ensemble of Chicago album), 2003
- "The Meeting" (The Office), a 2009 episode of The Office
- The Meeting (play), a 1987 American theatrical play
- The Meeting (2012 film), a film starring Rita Dominic
- The Meeting (short story), a 1972 science fiction short story by Frederik Pohl

== See also ==
- Meeting
- Rencontre (disambiguation) (French)
- The Meeting Point
- The Meeting School
- The Meeting Place Church (Winnipeg)
- The Meeting Place Cannot Be Changed
- The Meeting House
- The Last Meeting
