= Capital Collision =

- Promotions: New Japan Pro-Wrestling
- First event: Capital Collision (2022)

Capital Collision is an annual professional wrestling event promoted by New Japan Pro-Wrestling (NJPW). Since its inception, it is held annually at Washington, D.C.'s CareFirst Arena.

== Events ==
#	Event	Date	City	Venue	Attendance	Main event	Ref(s)
1	Capital Collision (2022)	May 14, 2022	Washington, D.C.	CareFirst Arena	2,641	Hiroshi Tanahashi (c) vs. Will Ospreay vs. Juice Robinson vs. Jon Moxley in a Four-way match for the IWGP United States Heavyweight Championship	
2	Capital Collision (2023)	April 15, 2023	Washington, D.C.	CareFirst Arena	2,179	Motor City Machine Guns (Chris Sabin & Alex Shelley) (c) vs. Aussie Open (Mark Davis & Kyle Fletcher) vs. Dream Team (Kazuchika Okada & Hiroshi Tanahashi) in a Three way tag team match for the Strong Openweight Tag Team Championship	
3	Capital Collision (2024)	August 30, 2024	Washington, D.C.	CareFirst Arena	2,266	Mercedes Moné (c) vs. Momo Watanabe for the Strong Women's Championship	
(c) – refers to the champion(s) heading into the match

== See also ==
- List of New Japan Pro-Wrestling pay-per-view events
