= Mighty Audio =

American company

- Type: Private
- Industry: Consumer electronics; Music; Technology
- Founded: July 2015; 11 years ago
- Founder: Anthony Mendelson
- Headquarters: Venice, California, U.S.
- Area served: Worldwide
- Products: Mighty
- Website: bemighty.com

Mighty Audio (often marketed and stylized as Mighty) is an American electronics company. Based in Los Angeles, California, it is known for its product Mighty, a portable audio player that plays Spotify and Amazon Music without a phone. The company was Spotify's first partner when it publicly launched in July 2017.

== History ==
The company was founded by Anthony Mendelson, an ex-Google employee. The original Mighty was designed based on the idea that running or working out with a smartphone was not a great experience with no solution at the time to listen to streaming music outside of the phone. The product has also been called the “iPod Shuffle for Spotify”, especially as the Shuffle was discontinued by Apple.

In 2016, Mighty Audio raised $300,101 through a Kickstarter campaign running from February 22 to March 23. The company followed this by raising an additional $295,702 on Indiegogo and sold an additional $300,000 in pre-orders from November 12, 2016, to June 23, 2016.

On February 1, 2018, it was announced that the company was part of the Techstars Music Class of 2018.

Although the release date of Mighty for its Kickstarter and Indiegogo backers was November 2016, the product was not released until July 2017. The company had to rebuild the product alongside Spotify and go through the Spotify certification process, which lasted 8 months.

== Products ==
Mighty Audio is one of two official partners of Spotify in the offline streaming space, the other being Samsung. The first product Mighty is 1.5 x 1.5 inches, 0.6 ounces, drop and water resistant, Bluetooth and WiFi enabled, has an 8GB storage capacity, and up to 5 hours of battery life.

Mighty Audio offers a mobile app for iOS and Android that is used to wirelessly sync Spotify Music to the Mighty via the player's Bluetooth and Wi-Fi. Once the music is stored on Mighty, the user no longer needs a phone or Internet connection for music playback. Mighty has a 3.5mm headset jack and also works with Bluetooth headphones. The device is limited to Spotify and Amazon Music content and users with a Spotify Premium account. Mighty can only currently sync playlists, not albums or individual tracks. The workaround is to add albums or songs to a playlist and sync the playlist.

In July 2017, users setting up Mightys with the mobile app experienced connectivity issues. The company released software updates to address these connectivity issues.

The device was met with criticism when it first launched as it did not have a shuffle feature. Shuffle functionality was added in September 2017 via a software update. Other items included in this update were shuffle functionality, aux cable support for speakers, improved battery life, connectivity stability fixes, the ability to sync individual playlists rather than everything loaded onto Mighty, and automatic playlist updates to the device, dubbed “Stay Fresh” by the company.
