= Mighty Atom =

Mighty Atom may refer to:

== People ==
=== Sports ===
- Jimmy Wilde (1892–1969), Welsh boxer
- Sydney Wooderson (1914–2006), English athlete
- Joe Greenstein (1893–1977), Polish-American strongman
- Barbara Buttrick (born 1929), English female boxer
- Eileen Sheridan (1923–2023), English cyclist

=== Other fields ===
- Mildred Albert (1905–1991), American fashion show producer and fashion personality
- Bruce Forsyth (1928–2017), British entertainer, known in his early career as Boy Bruce, the Mighty Atom
- Albert Power (1870–1948), Irish priest, academic and author

== Film and television ==
- "The Mighty Atom" (Thunderbirds), the 14th episode of the first season of the Supermarionation television series Thunderbirds
- Mighty Atom (TV series), a 1959 Japanese Tokusatsu live action TV show
- The Mighty Atom, a 1958 animated short film featuring Reddy Kilowatt

== Other uses ==
- Mighty Atom (1988 video game), published by Konami
- Mighty Atom (1994 video game), published by Banpresto
- Mighty Atom, the original Japanese name for the manga comic series Astro Boy created by Osamu Tezuka
- Mighty Atom Records, a Welsh-based record label
- The Mighty Atom, a novel by Marie Corelli
