= Rencontre =

Rencontre or La Rencontre may refer to:

- Rencontre East, Newfoundland and Labrador, Canada
- Rencontre West, Newfoundland and Labrador, Canada
- "Rencontre", two short stories by Guy de Maupassant, 1882 and 1884
- La rencontre, an 1854 painting by Gustave Courbet
- La rencontre, a 2015 album by Emmanuel Moire
- Éditions Rencontre, a defunct French-language Swiss publishing house
