= The Mighty Don't Kneel =

Professional wrestling stable

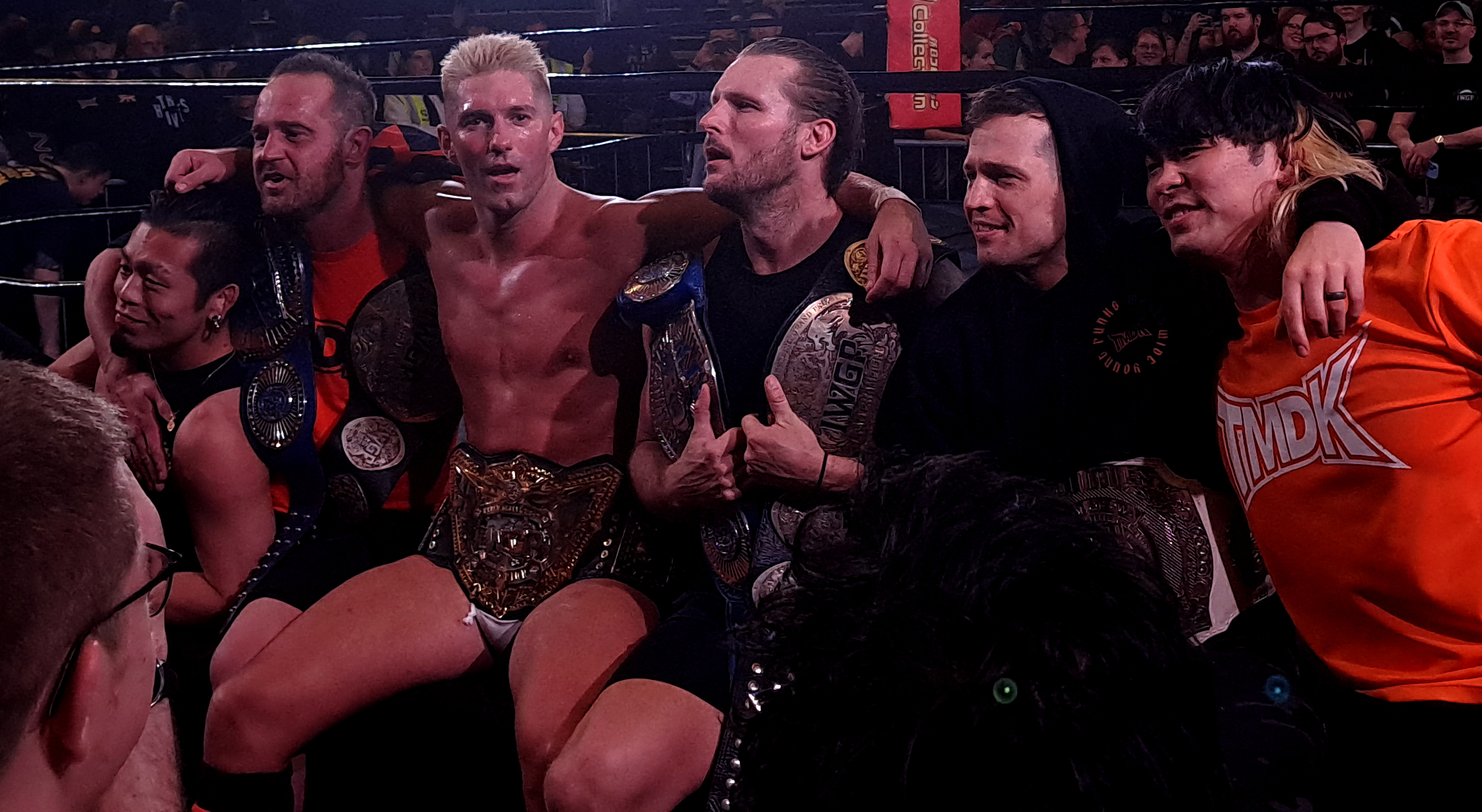
- Left to right: Kosei Fujita, Mikey Nicholls, Zack Sabre Jr., Shane Haste, Robbie Eagles and Ryohei Oiwa in October 2024.

Statistics
- Name(s): The Mighty Don't Kneel; TMDK; TM-61; The Mighty
- Leader: Zack Sabre Jr. (II)
- Members: See below
- Former members: Jonah/Jonah Rock (I); Elliot Sexton
- Debut: 16 May 2008
- Years active: 2008–2018; 2022–present

The Mighty Don't Kneel (TMDK) are a professional wrestling stable performing mainly in New Japan Pro-Wrestling (NJPW). The stable consists of leader Zack Sabre Jr., Mikey Nicholls, Shane Haste, Bad Dude Tito, Robbie Eagles, Kosei Fujita, Hartley Jackson, and Ryohei Oiwa.

The stable was primarily known as a tag team in Pro Wrestling Noah, with Nicholls and Haste being two-time GHC Tag Team Champions. They also worked for Ring of Honor (ROH), Total Nonstop Action Wrestling (TNA) and WWE (where they were named TM-61 and The Mighty in NXT). TMDK has also been said to stand for "Torture, Murder, Destroy, Kill".

Nicholls and Veryzer were once signed with WWE and were assigned to its developmental territory NXT, Nicholls and Veryzer were renamed Nick Miller and Shane Thorne, while their tag team was renamed TM-61 and later, The Mighty. However, the team would disband in 2018 following Nicholls' release.

== History ==
=== Formation (2010–2011) ===
In the autumn of 2010, Australian wrestlers Mikey Nicholls and Shane Haste passed a tryout held by Pro Wrestling Noah and World League Wrestling (WLW) in the United States, which allowed them to begin training at Noah's dojo. They made their debut for the Japanese promotion on 23 February 2011, and began working together under the team name "TMDK". The Mighty Don't Kneel originated in the Explosive Pro Wrestling (EPW) promotion where it was a stable also including Jonah Rock and Elliot Sexton, who had been teaming together as SexRock. Rock has also represented TMDK in Noah. Nicholls and Haste then began working regularly for Noah in the promotion's junior heavyweight tag team division, though it was questioned whether the two actually were under the 100 kg (220 lb) weight limit.

=== Pro Wrestling Noah (2011–2016) ===
On 15 December 2011, Nicholls and Haste received their first shot at the GHC Junior Heavyweight Tag Team Championship, but were defeated by the defending champions, Atsushi Aoki and Kotaro Suzuki. Shortly afterwards, Nicholls and Haste left the junior heavyweight division.

Back in Noah, Nicholls and Haste also began breaking out in singles action, taking part in the 2012 Global League, where Nicholls wrestled KENTA to a draw and defeated Go Shiozaki, while Haste was victorious over Akitoshi Saito and Naomichi Marufuji. In April 2013, Nicholls and Haste took part in their first Global Tag League. Though failing to advance to the finals, they picked up a win over the reigning GHC Tag Team Champions, New Japan Pro-Wrestling representatives Takashi Iizuka and Toru Yano. This led to a title match between the two teams on 12 May, where Iizuka and Yano retained their title. Earlier that day, Noah had announced that Nicholls and Haste had signed contracts to become officially affiliated with the promotion. A rubber match between Nicholls and Haste and Iizuka and Yano took place on 7 July and saw TMDK emerge victorious and become the new GHC Tag Team Champions. In September, Nicholls and Haste both began chasing the GHC Heavyweight Championship, but were defeated in back-to-back title matches by the defending champion, KENTA. On 10 December, the Tokyo Sports magazine named Nicholls and Haste the 2013 tag team of the year, with the two becoming the first gaijin team to win the "Best Tag Team Award" since Stan Hansen and Vader in 1998. On 25 January 2014, Nicholls and Haste lost the GHC Tag Team Championship to Maybach Taniguchi and GHC Heavyweight Champion Takeshi Morishima.

On 10 January 2015, Nicholls and Haste defeated Dangan Yankies (Masato Tanaka and Takashi Sugiura) to win the GHC Tag Team Championship for the second time. They lost the title to K.E.S. (Davey Boy Smith Jr. and Lance Archer) on 11 February. On 28 December 2015, Noah announced that Nicholls and Haste would leave the promotion following their contracts expiring at the end of the year. On 11 February 2016, Noah announced that Haste and Nicholls would return to the promotion the following month to take part in a five-show-long farewell tour, entitled "Departure to the World". Their final Noah match took place on 10 March and saw them defeat Naomichi Marufuji and Mitsuhiro Kitamiya. In February 2016, it was reported that Nicholls and Haste would join WWE's NXT brand following their Noah farewell tour the following month. WWE confirmed the signings on 25 March 2016.

=== Independent circuit (2012–2016) ===
In early 2012, Nicholls and Haste traveled to the United States, where they worked for several promotions, including Ohio Valley Wrestling (OVW), Ring of Honor (ROH), and Total Nonstop Action Wrestling (TNA). In ROH, they won a one-night tournament to earn a match against the Briscoe Brothers at the Showdown in the Sun pay-per-view.

=== New Japan Pro-Wrestling (2014–2015) ===
On 20 December 2014, Haste and Nicholls made their debut for New Japan Pro-Wrestling (NJPW), when they, along with Naomichi Marufuji, were revealed as Toru Yano's tag team partners at Wrestle Kingdom 9 in Tokyo Dome on 4 January 2015. They would go on to win the match, defeating Suzuki-gun (Davey Boy Smith Jr., Lance Archer, Shelton X Benjamin and Takashi Iizuka).

=== WWE (2015–2018) ===
In June 2015, Nicholls and Haste took part in a WWE tryout camp. In February 2016, it was reported that Nicholls and Haste were scheduled to join WWE's NXT brand following their NOAH farewell tour.

On 25 March 2016, WWE confirmed the signings of both Nicholls and Haste. They began training at the WWE Performance Center in April, while working for the promotion's developmental branch NXT. During the 19 May NXT tapings, Haste and Nicholls were renamed Shane Thorne and Nick Miller, respectively, while TMDK was renamed TM-61, where TM is derived from their respective last names (Thorne and Miller) while 61 is from Australia's dialing code (+61). They debuted on the 25 May episode, losing to Johnny Gargano and Tommaso Ciampa.

On the 7 October episode of NXT, Thorne and Miller were announced as participants in the Dusty Rhodes Tag Team Classic. On 12 October, they defeated the team of Riddick Moss and Tino Sabbatelli to advance from the first round of the tournament. Thorne next defeated Roderick Strong in a singles match (due to Strong's partner Austin Aries being unable to wrestle through injury), to proceed his team to the semi-finals, where they went on to defeat SAnitY, thus setting the final against the Authors of Pain. On 19 November at NXT TakeOver: Toronto, TM-61 lost in the final. On the 18 January episode of NXT, Thorne suffered a serious knee injury due to an attack by The Revival (Scott Dawson and Dash Wilder) after TM-61 had defeated them. He had surgery on 25 January, which was expected to put him out of action for seven to nine months. He returned from the injury on 14 September.

On the 3 January episode of NXT, the return of TM-61 was announced. During the following weeks, vignettes of TM-61 were shown. They made their in ring return on 31 January episode of NXT, defeating The Ealy Brothers. TM-61 then entered the 2018 Dusty Rhodes Tag Team Classic, being eliminated by the Authors of Pain in the first round. On the 2 May edition of NXT, TM-61 defeated Street Profits (Angelo Dawkins and Montez Ford) with a dirty pin, thus turning the duo heel in the process. The following week, they defeated the team of Heavy Machinery (Otis Dozovic and Tucker Knight) with the same tactics. The team was officially renamed "The Mighty", on the 6 June 2018 episode of NXT. On the 20 July episode of NXT, they were defeated by War Raiders. In July, they started a feud with Street Profits with both teams losing matches to each other. On the 19 September episode of NXT, The Mighty defeated Street Profits.

On 14 December 2018, Miller was removed from the "WWE NXT" section of WWE.com, confirming his release and disbanding the team.

=== Return to NJPW (2022–present) ===
==== Jonah's leadership (2022) ====
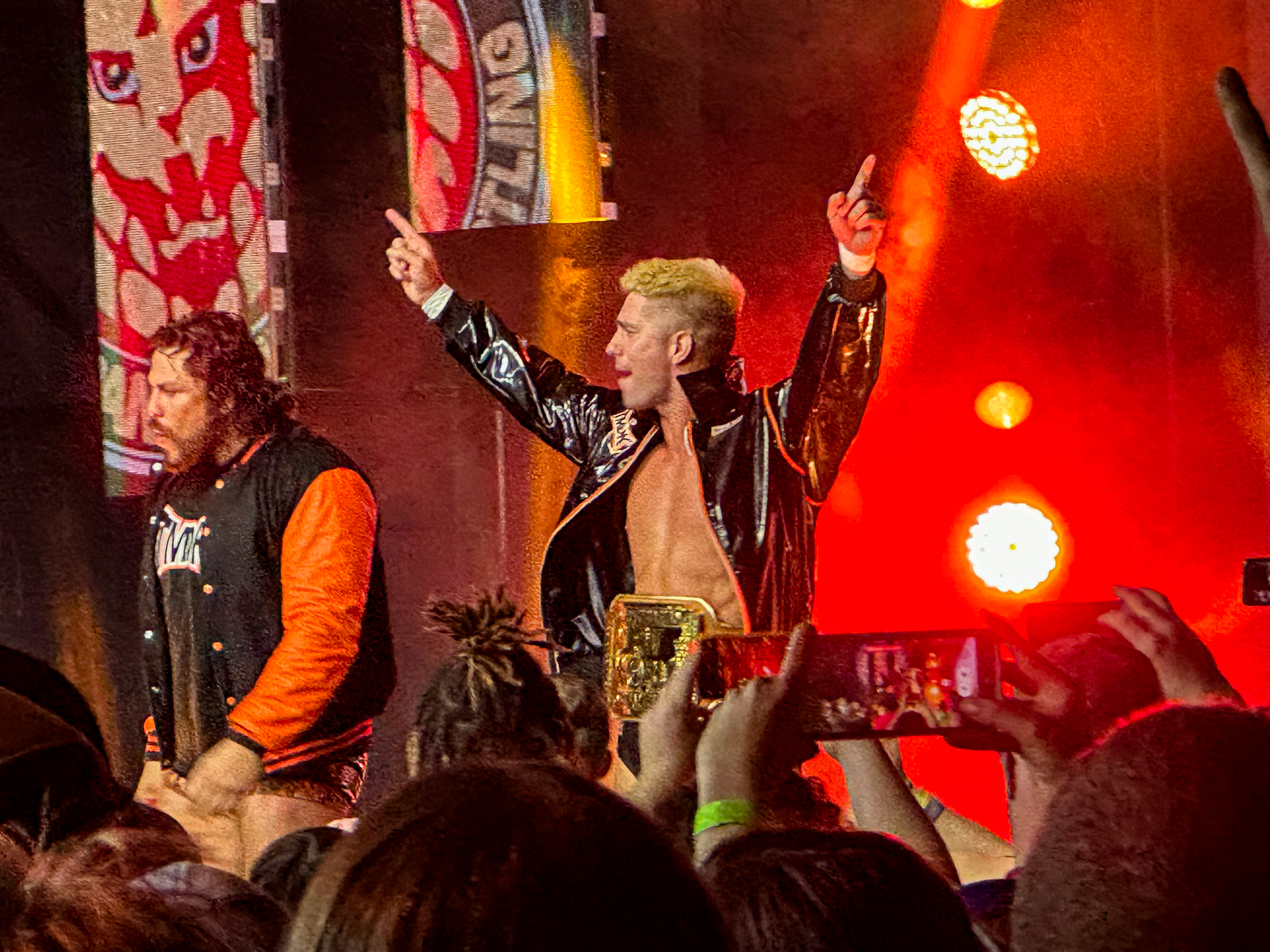
Bad Dude Tito (left) and Zack Sabre Jr. (right) at Collision in Philadelphia 2023.

On the 6 March 2022, episode of NJPW Strong, Shane Haste interfered in the tag team match between FinJuice (David Finlay and Juice Robinson) and the pairing of Jonah (formerly Jonah Rock) and Bad Dude Tito. He attacked Robinson while the referee was distracted, allowing Tito to hit a frog splash on Robinson for the win. This saw the reformation of TMDK, with Haste and Jonah tagging together. On the 3 April episode of NJPW Strong, Haste caused a disqualification loss to FinJuice after he struck Robinson with a steel chair. Robinson challenged TMDK and Tito to a Chicago Street Fight at Windy City Riot, alongside a mystery partner. At the event, TMDK and Tito were defeated by FinJuice and their partner, revealed to be Brody King. On 14 May, at Capital Collision, Mikey Nicholls was reunited with Haste, leaving CHAOS in the process. TMDK and Bad Dude Tito defeated the United Empire, with Nicholls pinning Kyle Fletcher for the win. After the match, Tito, who had been tagging with Jonah since the start of the year, officially joined TMDK. Haste and Nicholls then entered a tournament to become the inaugural Strong Openweight Tag Team Champions, but were defeated in the semi-final to the pairing of Christopher Daniels and Yuya Uemura.

On 20 June, Jonah was announced as being part of G1 Climax 32. He would be accompanied by Tito, with both wrestlers being used in undercard tag team matches throughout the tournament.

==== Zack Sabre Jr.'s leadership (2023–present) ====
Following Jonah's exit from the group due to his return to WWE, Zack Sabre Jr. would officially join the stable and become the stable's new leader after his victory to become NJPW World Television Champion at Wrestle Kingdom 17. During the following New Year Dash!! show on 5 January, NJPW confirmed on social media that Kosei Fujita would also join the stable. On 21 March, at the New Japan Cup 2023 Finals, Robbie Eagles announced that he will challenge Hiromu Takahashi for the IWGP Junior Heavyweight Championship at Sakura Genesis on 8 April 2023. During the same night he would also be announced as the newest member of TMDK, thus leaving Chaos in the process. At the event, Eagles lost to Takahashi.

On 15 August 2024, during G1 Climax 34, Hartley Jackson returned to NJPW for the first time in eighteen years and joined TMDK, replacing the injured Kosei Fujita and partnering Sabre as a mystery partner in a tag team match against Bullet Club War Dogs (David Finlay and Gedo). Post-match, in a backstage promo, Sabre announced that Jackson is now a member of TMDK. On 18 August, Sabre won the G1 Climax 34. On 29 September, at Destruction in Kobe, Ryohei Oiwa joined TMDK. On October 14 at King of Pro-Wrestling, Sabre defeated Naito to win the IWGP World Heavyweight Championship. On 4 November, at Power Struggle, Eagles and Fujita won the Super Junior Tag League.

At Wrestle Kingdom 19 on January 4, 2025, Ichiban Sweet Boys (Fujita and Eagles) won the Jr. Heavyweight Tag Team championship in a four-way Tokyo Terror ladder match. On February 11, 2025 at The New Beginning in Osaka, Sabre Jr. lost the IWGP World Heavyweight Championship to Hirooki Goto. On April 29 at Hizen no Kuni, Ichiban Sweet Boys lost the IWGP Junior Heavyweight Tag Team Championship to Spiritech (Master Wato and Yoh). On June 1, 2025, Fujita defeated Yoh in the final of the Best of the Super Juniors, earning an IWGP Junior Heavyweight Championship match against El Desperado. At Tanahashi Jam on June 29, 2025, Sabre regained the IWGP World Heavyweight Championship from Goto. On July 6 at New Japan Soul: Night 9, Fujita lost the IWGP Junior Heavyweight Championship match to El Desperado. From 21 July 2025 to 18 August 2025, Oiwa and Sabre Jr. both participated in G1 Climax 35 (A and B Block respectively), with Oiwa failing to advance out of his block with a record of 4–5, while Sabre Jr. won his block with a 7–2 record and advanced directly to the semifinals, where he lost to Konosuke Takeshita. From 23 October to 1 November, Fujita and Eagles participated in the 2025 Super Junior Tag League, finishing second on tiebreak in Block B with 8 points; 4–1 and failing to advance to the finals. At the end of the year, the team of Sabre and Oiwa won the 2025 World Tag League when they defeated Gabe Kidd and Yota Tsuji in the finals.

At Wrestle Kingdom 20 on January 4, 2026, Sabre, Oiwa and Jackson won a Ranbo by last eliminating Boltin Oleg and Bishamon (Goto and Yoshi-Hashi) to win the NEVER Openweight Six-Man Tag Team Championship, while Fujita lost a four-way match to determine the #1 contender to the IWGP Junior Heavyweight Championship to El Desperado. The following night at New Year Dash, Fujita and Eagles defeated La Oscuridad, El Desperado and Kuukai, and Ishimori and Robbie X in a four-way tag team match to win the IWGP Junior Heavyweight Tag Team Championship for a second time, whole Sabre and Oiwa failed to win the IWGP Tag Team Championship from Knock Out Brothers (Oskar and Yuto-Ice). On January 19 at Road to the New Beginning: Night 1, Sabre, Oiwa and Jackson lost the NEVER Openweight Six-Man Tag Team Championship to Boltin Oleg, Hirooki Goto and Yoshi-Hashi. On March 6 at NJPW's 54th Anniversary Show, Ichiban Sweet Boys lost the IWGP Junior Heavyweight Tag Team Championship to Taiji Ishimori and Robbie X, ending their second reign at 60 days. From March 8 till March 15, Jackson, Oiwa and Sabre participated in the 2026 New Japan Cup, with Jackson eliminated in the second round by eventual winner Callum Newman, Oiwa eliminating Yuto-Ice in the first round before being eliminated by Sabre in the second round, and Sabre eliminating Oiwa in the second round before being eliminated by Shota Umino in the quarterfinals. On April 4 at Sakura Genesis, Sabre and Oiwa failed to defeat Knock Out Brothers (Oskar and Yuto-Ice) for the IWGP Tag Team Championship. On August 9, 2026 at Noah Legacy Rise, Shane Haste lost the GHC Heavyweight Championship to Tetsuya Naito. From July 11 till August 16, Sabre Jr. and Oiwa participated in G1 Climax 36 (B and A block respectively), with Sabre finshing with 10 points (5–4) and Oiwa finishing with 12 points (6–3), with only Oiwa qualifying for the semis; Oiwa went on to defeat Callum Newman in the semifinals before defeating Yuya Uemura in the final to capture the G1 Climax for the first time in his career.

=== All Elite Wrestling / Ring of Honor (2023–present) ===
Due to NJPW's working relationships, members of TMDK have made appearances in All Elite Wrestling (AEW) and Ring of Honor (ROH) since 2023, notably Sabre Jr. facing Bryan Danielson at WrestleDream in October 2023, and other members challenging for various titles, such as the AEW World Trios Championship in 2023 and the ROH World Six-Man Tag Team Championship in 2023 and 2026. After leaving NJPW, Haste and Nicholls began working for ROH on the tapings of HonorClub in 2026.

== Members ==
The Mighty Don't Kneel
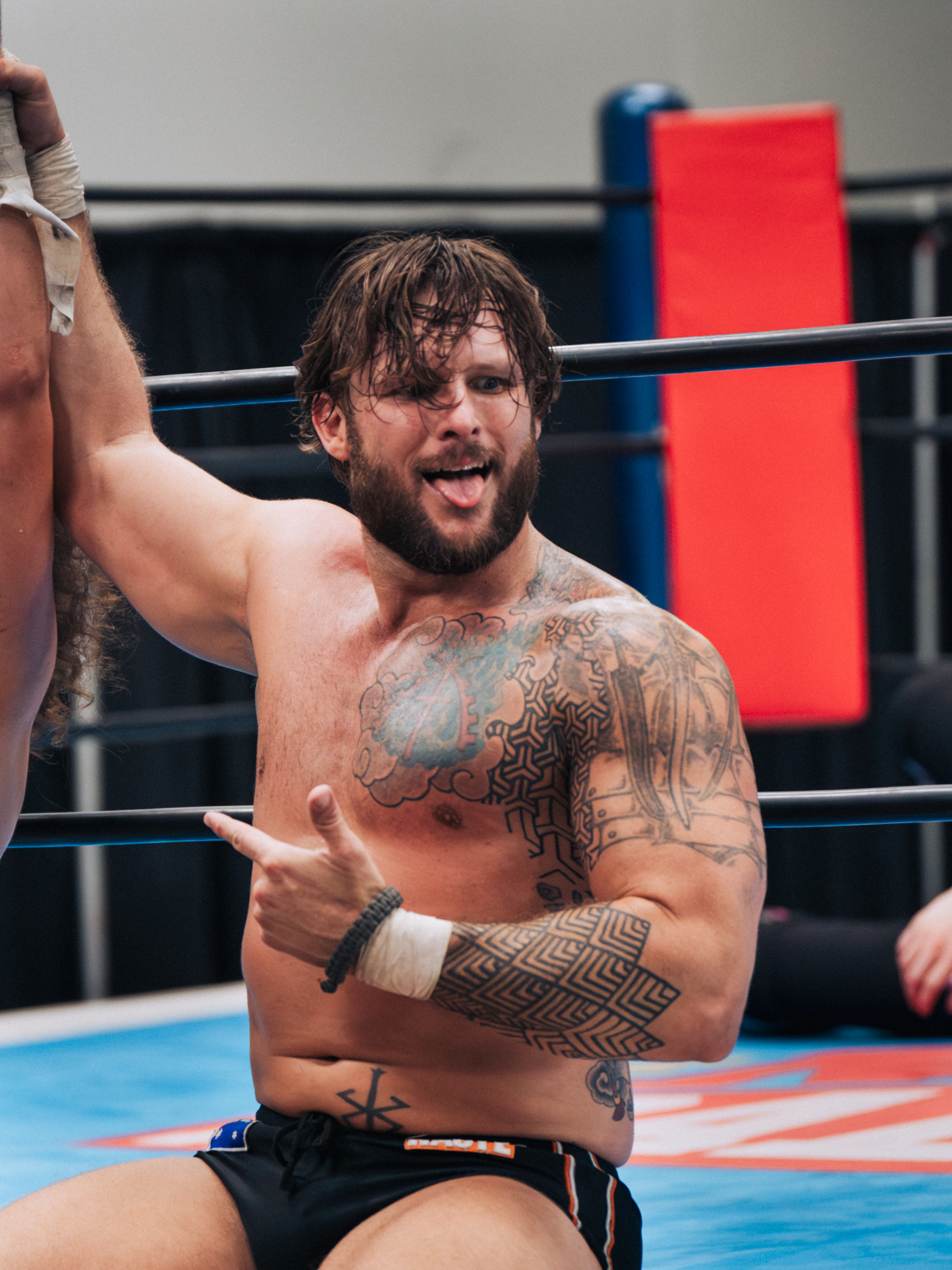
Shane Haste

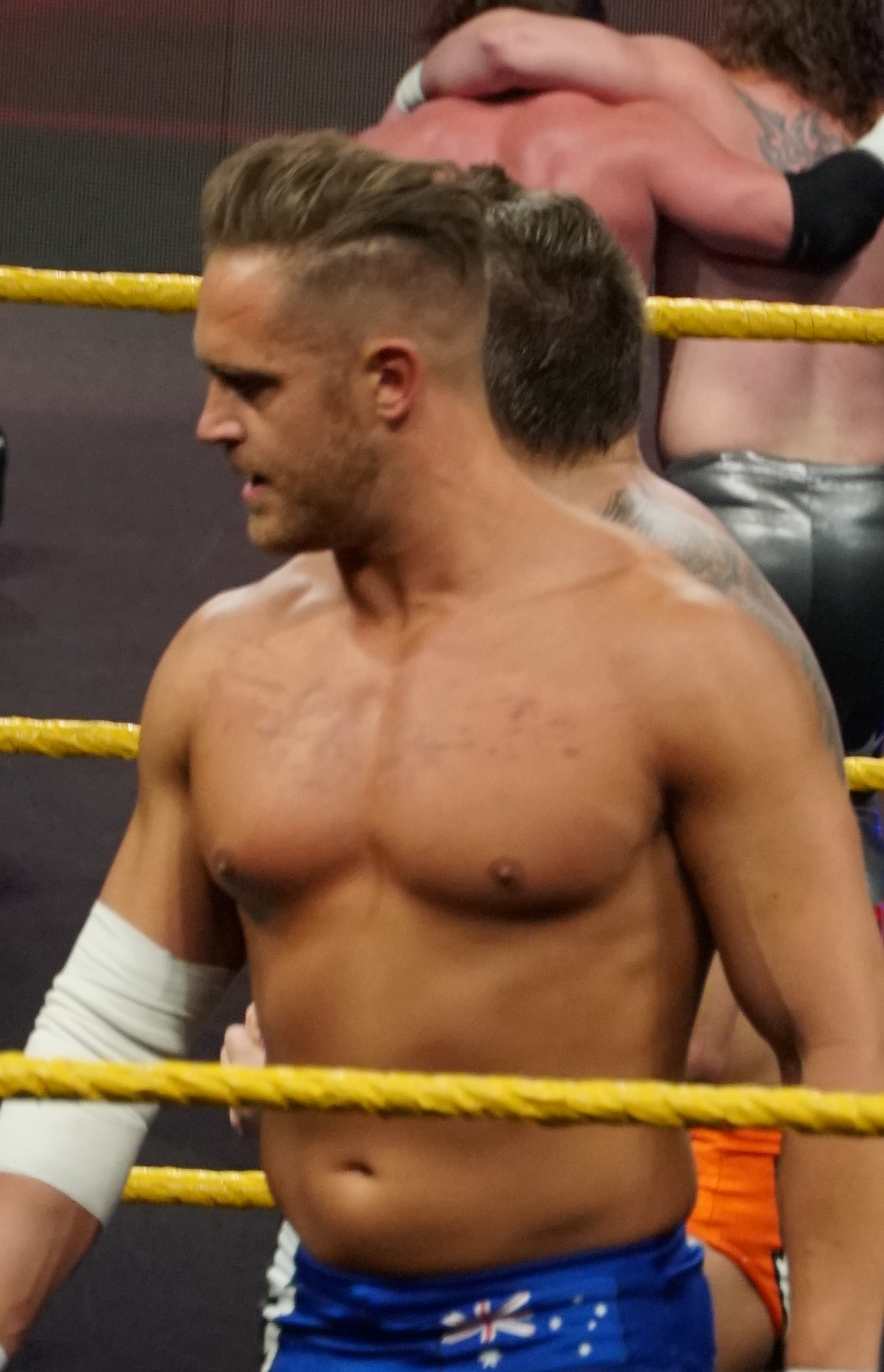
Mikey Nicholls

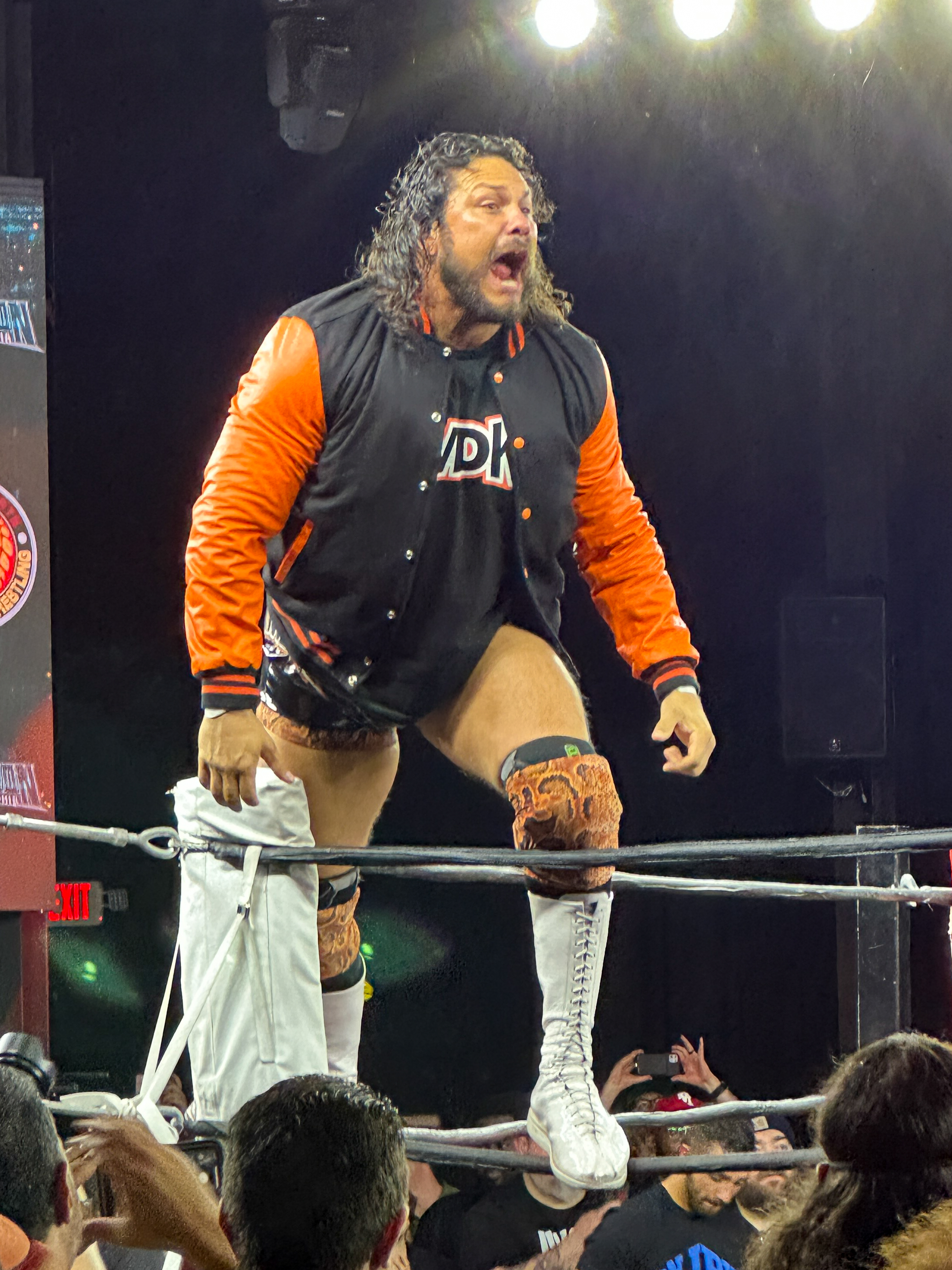
Bad Dude Tito

Zack Sabre Jr. (II)

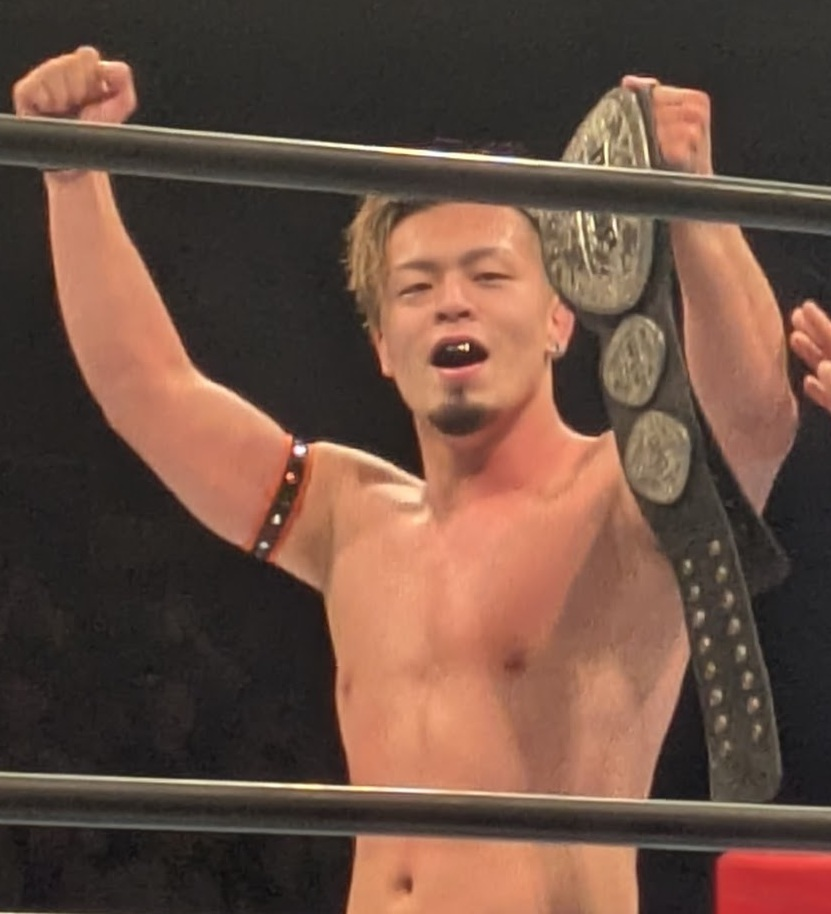
Kosei Fujita

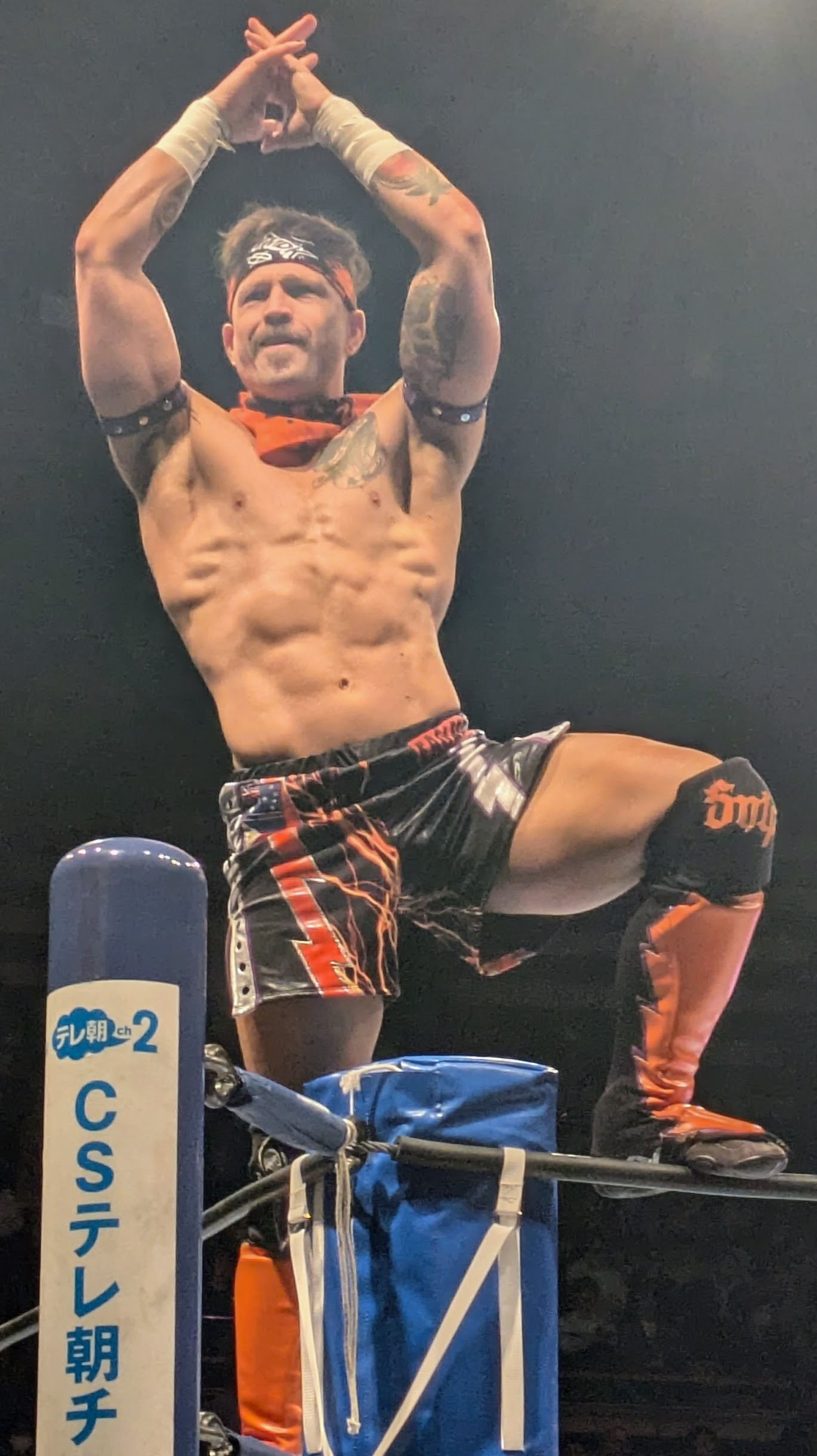
Robbie Eagles

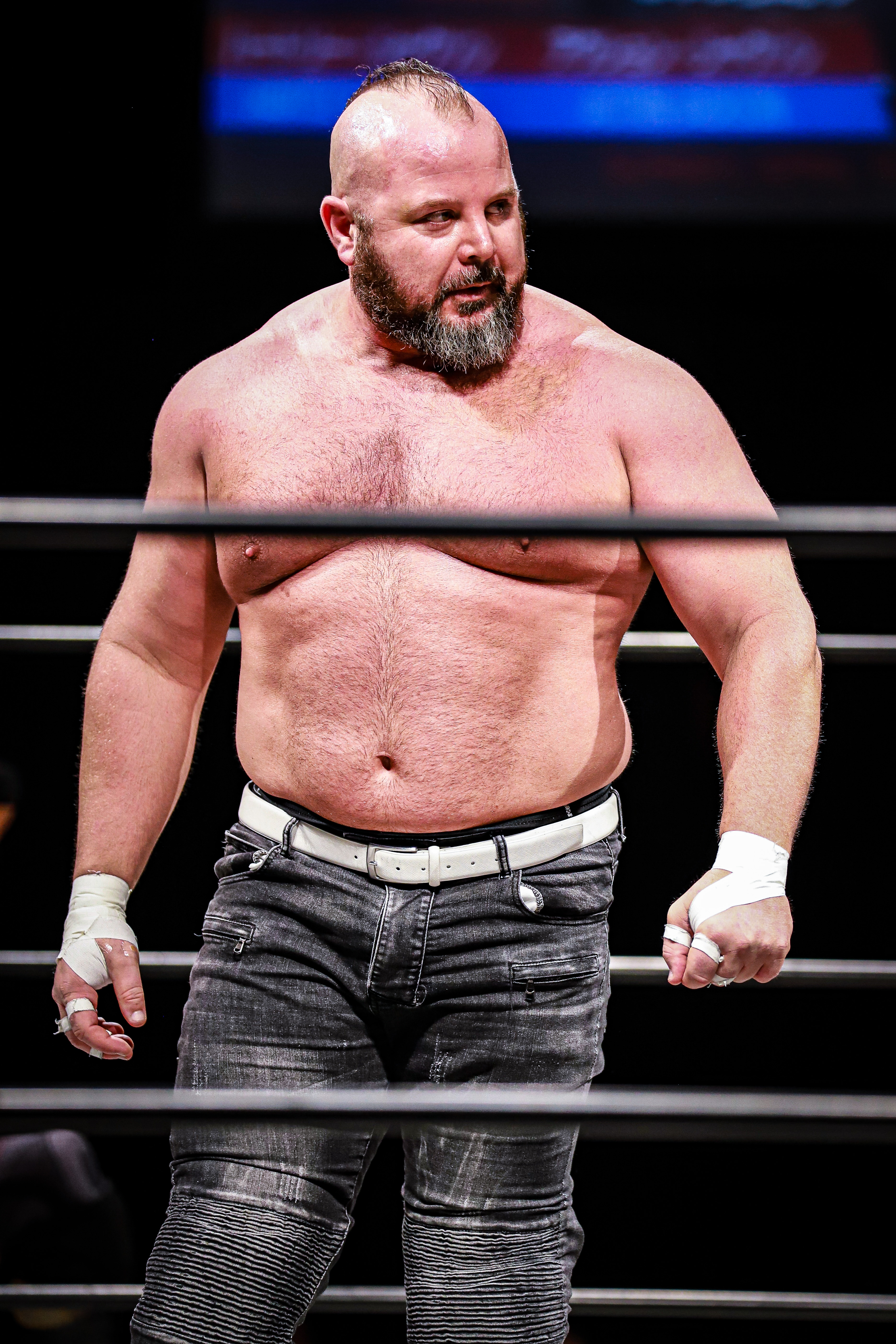
Hartley Jackson

Ryohei Oiwa

== Other media ==
Miller and Thorne made their video game debut in WWE 2K18 and later appear in WWE 2K19.

== Championships and accomplishments ==
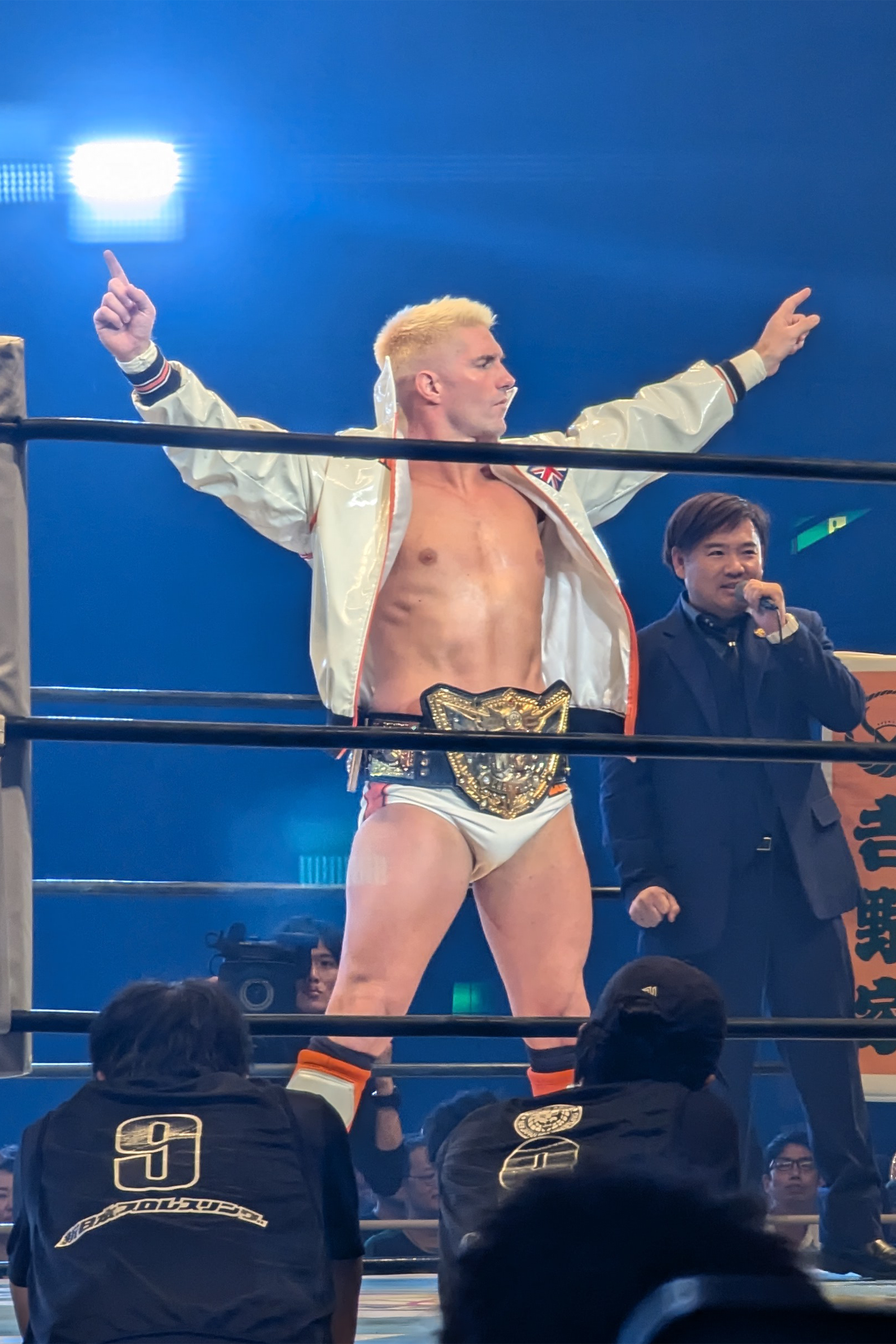
Zack Sabre Jr. as IWGP Heavyweight Champion

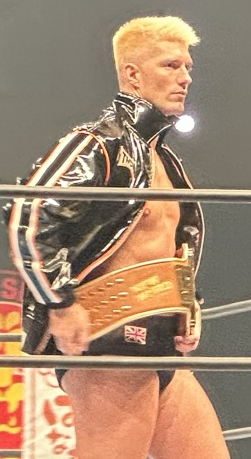
Zack Sabre Jr. as NJPW World Television Champion

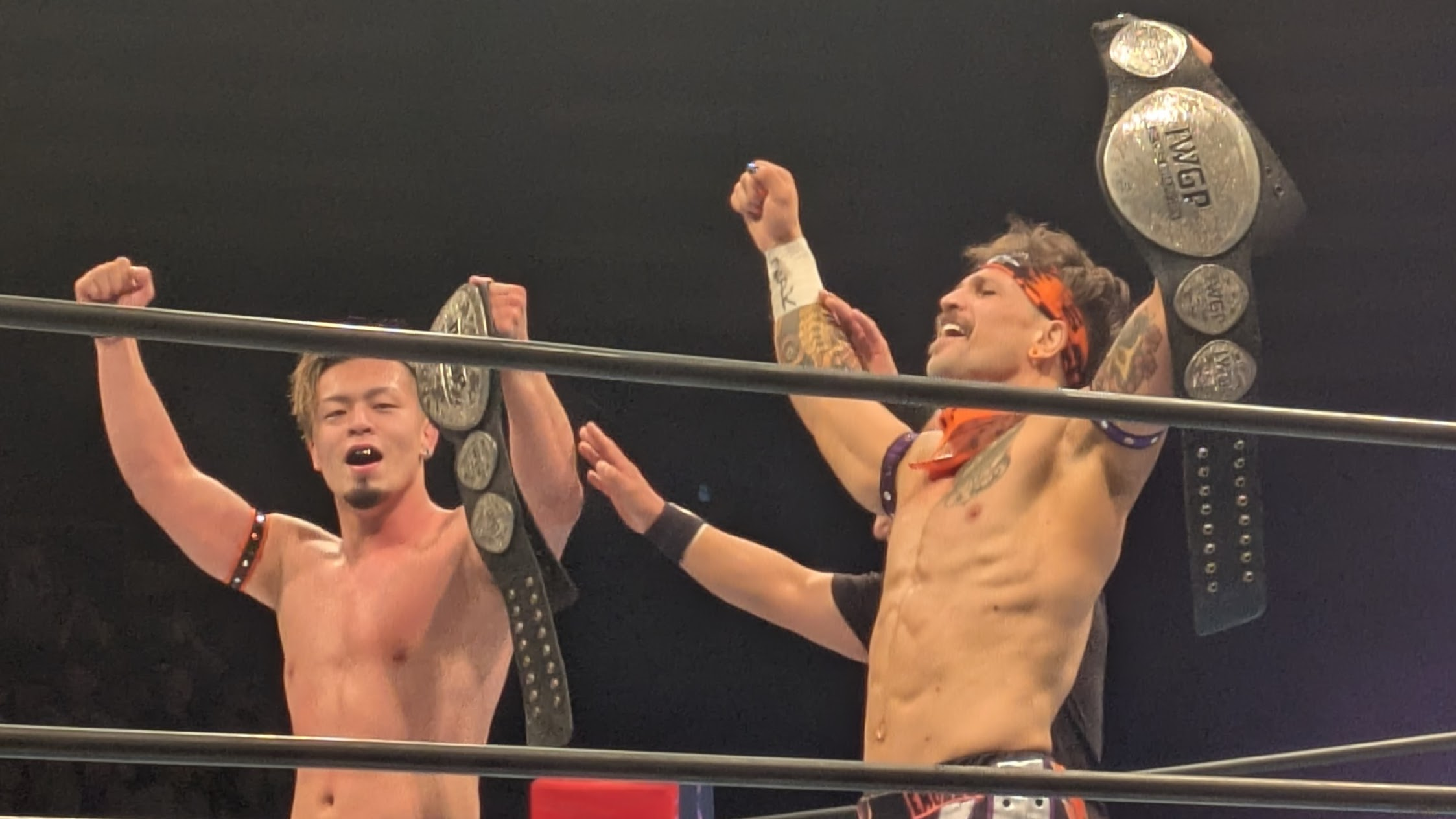
Kosei Fujita and Robbie Eagles as IWGP Junior Heavyweight Tag Team Champions

- Consejo Mundial de Lucha Libre
  - CMLL World Heavyweight Championship (1 time, current) – Sabre Jr.
- Explosive Professional Wrestling
  - EPW Heavyweight Championship (4 times) – Nicholls (2), Haste (1), Slex (1)
  - EPW Tag Team Championship (1 time) – Haste and Nicholls (1)
- Melbourne City Wrestling
  - MCW Heavyweight Championship (2 times) – Slex (1), and Rock
  - MCW Intercommonwealth Championship (3 times) – Slex (2) and Rock (1)
  - MCW Tag Team Championship (1 time) – Rock and Jackson (1)
- New Japan Pro-Wrestling
  - IWGP Heavyweight Championship (2 times) (Note: During both of Sabre Jr.'s reigns, the title was called the IWGP World Heavyweight Championship.) – Sabre Jr.
  - IWGP Intercontinental Championship (2 times) (Note: With the reactivation of the IWGP Heavyweight Championship and the restored and combined histories of both it, the World Heavyweight, and the Intercontinental titles, all former IWGP World Heavyweight Champions are retroactively recognized as having been an IWGP Intercontinental Champion.) – Sabre Jr.
  - NJPW World Television Championship (2 times, inaugural) – Sabre Jr.
  - IWGP Tag Team Championship (1 time) – Nicholls and Haste
  - IWGP Junior Heavyweight Tag Team Championship (3 times) – Eagles and Fujita
  - NEVER Openweight 6-Man Tag Team Championship (1 time) – Sabre Jr., Oiwa and Jackson
  - Strong Openweight Tag Team Championship (2 times) – Nicholls and Haste
  - G1 Climax (2024) – Sabre Jr.
  - G1 Climax (2026) – Oiwa
  - Super Junior Tag League (2024) – Eagles and Fujita
  - Best of the Super Juniors (2025) – Fujita
  - World Tag League (2025) – Sabre Jr. and Oiwa
- Pro Wrestling Illustrated
  - Singles wrestlers
    - Ranked Zack Sabre Jr. No. 13 of the top 500 singles wrestlers in the PWI 500 of 2025
    - Ranked Bad Dude Tito No. 284 of the top 500 singles wrestlers in the PWI 500 of 2024
    - Ranked Kosei Fujita No. 70 of the top 500 singles wrestlers in the PWI 500 of 2025
    - Ranked Robbie Eagles No. 169 of the top 500 singles wrestlers in the PWI 500 of 2025
    - Ranked Ryohei Oiwa No. 182 of the top singles wrestlers in the PWI 500 in 2026
  - Tag teams
    - Ranked No. 5 of the top 100 tag teams in the PWI Tag Team 100 in 2025 – Mikey Nicholls and Shane Haste
- Pro Wrestling Noah
  - GHC Heavyweight Championship (1 time) – Haste
  - GHC Tag Team Championship (2 times) – Haste and Nicholls
- Tokyo Sports
  - Best Tag Team Award (2013) – Haste and Nicholls
  - MVP Award (2024) – Sabre Jr.
