= CareFirst Arena =

Multipurpose arena in Washington, D.C.

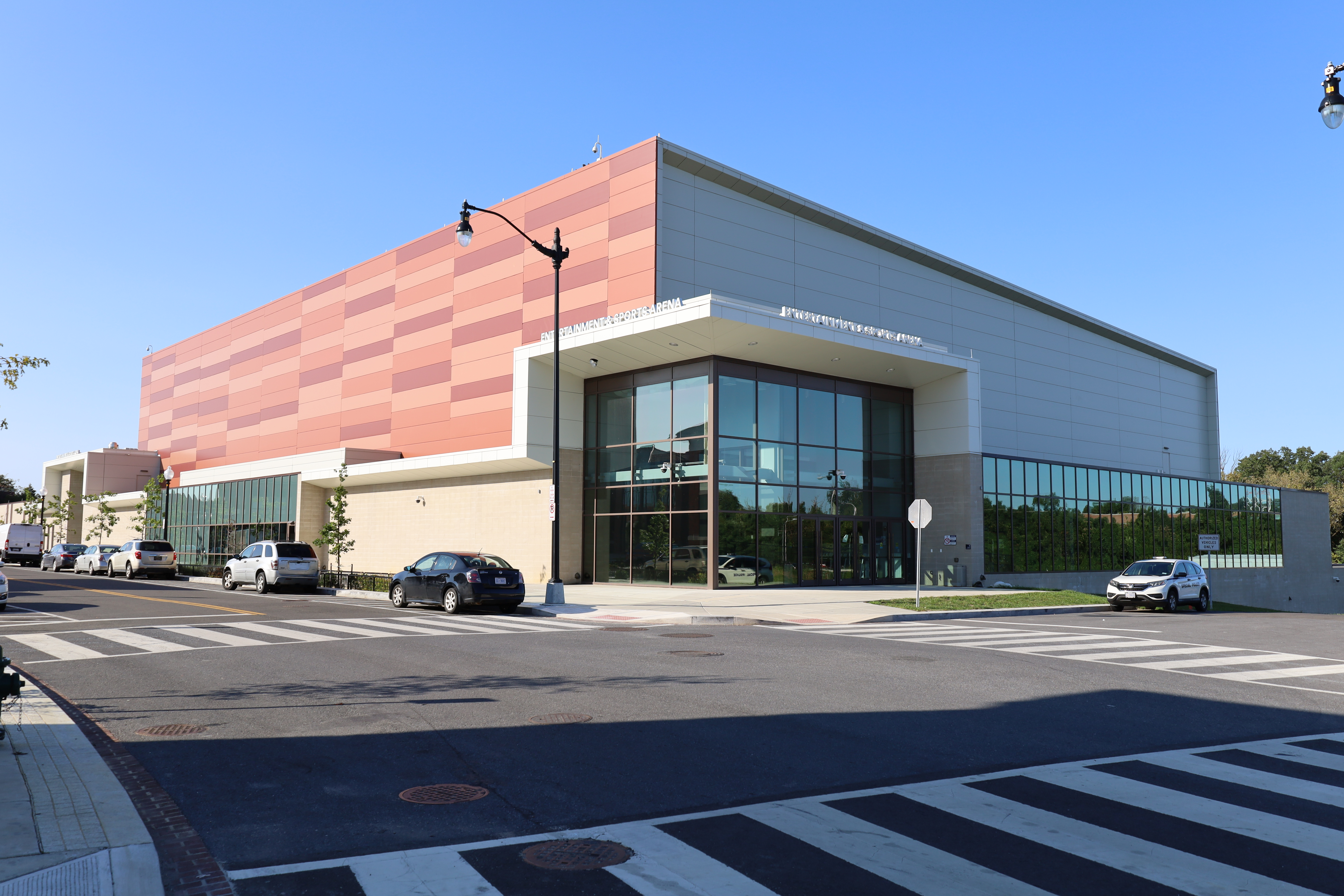
- Exterior of the venue in 2020

- Location within the District of Columbia Location within the United States
- Interactive map of CareFirst Arena
- Former names: St. Elizabeths East Entertainment and Sports Arena (planning/construction) Entertainment and Sports Arena (2018–2025)
- Address: 1100 Oak Drive SE
- Location: Washington, D.C., U.S.
- Coordinates: 38°50′49.1″N 76°59′29.2″W
- Owner: District of Columbia
- Operator: Events DC
- Capacity: 4,200 Detailed capacity: Concerts: 4,119; Basketball: 4,111; Boxing: 4,222; Esports: 4,119
- Public transit: Washington Metro: at Congress Heights

Construction
- Groundbreaking: July 17, 2017
- Opened: September 22, 2018
- Cost: $69 million ($90.6 million in 2025 dollars)
- Architects: Rossetti Architects; Marshall Moya Design Group
- Project managers: Brailsford & Dunlavey
- Structural engineers: Setty & Associates
- Services engineer: Wiles Mensch Corporation
- General contractor: Smoot Construction
- Main contractor: Gilbane Building Company

Tenants
- Capital City Go-Go (NBAGL) 2018–present Washington Mystics (WNBA) 2019–present

Website
- Official website

CareFirst Arena, formerly known as the Entertainment and Sports Arena, is an indoor arena in Washington, D.C. It is located on the St. Elizabeths East Campus in the Congress Heights residential neighborhood. The arena is home to the Washington Mystics of the WNBA and the Capital City Go-Go of the NBA G League. In addition, it houses a practice facility for the Washington Wizards of the NBA.

The arena opened on September 22, 2018. It rebranded as CareFirst Arena in 2025.

== Design ==
The 4,200-seat indoor arena is mainly used for basketball. The location of the arena was selected due to its proximity to St. Elizabeths Hospital, distance to the greater Washington, D.C. area, location to the Congress Heights station of the Washington Metro, the confluence of the Potomac and Anacostia Rivers, and ability to improve the local community through jobs and infrastructure improvements.

== History ==
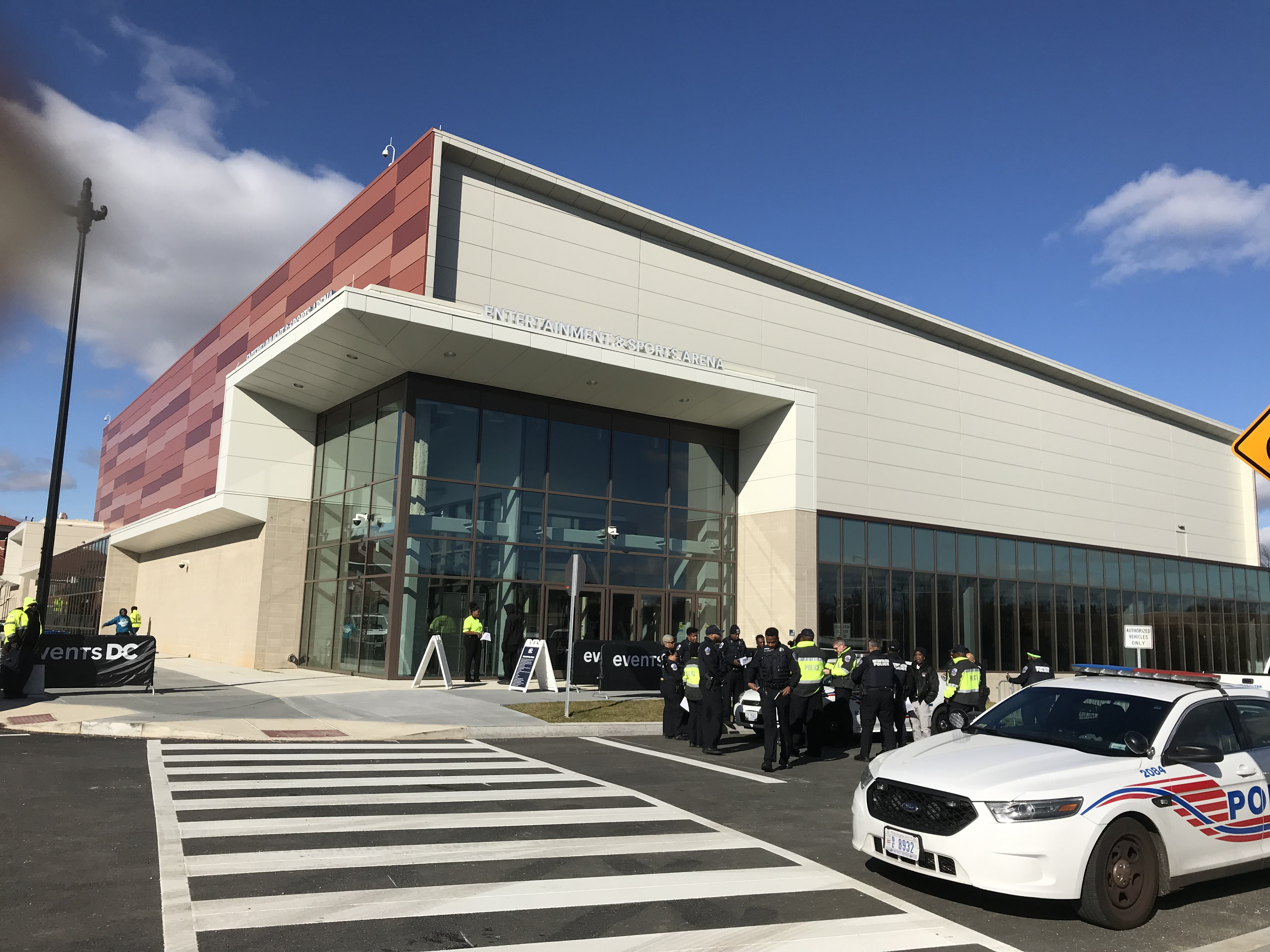
The venue circa 2018.

Construction for the arena, to include razing of surrounding buildings, began on February 19, 2016. Of the $65 million estimated cost for construction, 90% of the cost was to be taxpayer funded. The District of Columbia owns the facility while Events DC will operate the facility.

Members of the DC Council sought to introduce legislation capping public expenditure in the case of cost overruns. On July 28, Greg O'Dell, Chairperson of Events DC, requested an additional $10 million in funding while decreasing the number of seats in the facility. He said earlier estimates were premature.

In 2018, O'Dell announced that the cost had increased to $68.8 million, due in part to additions like drywall, and catwalks and higher than anticipated costs like contractors. The final cost was nearly 25 percent more than estimated, which DC taxpayers were required to cover.

Events DC boasted about the number of local business used in the construction of the facility, but could not provide a list of any of the businesses. Local businesses reported that they were unable to find work at the site.

== Operations ==
Events DC significantly underestimated the costs of operating the facility and in 2019 the Events DC board approved more than $1 million in additional costs to cover the shortfall. A contract for a firm to find naming rights for the facility was funded at $180,000 per year.

=== Events ===
- PFL 10, a mixed martial arts event, was held at the arena on October 20, 2018.
- Games 1, 2, and 5 of the 2019 WNBA Finals were held at the arena.
- The Coastal Athletic Association men's basketball tournament has been held at the arena every year since 2020 (except for 2021), and the conference's women's basketball tournament has been held at the arena since 2024.
- All Elite Wrestling's television series Dynamite and Rampage were held at the arena January 19 and 21, 2022, October 5 and 7, 2022, and December 18, 2024.
- New Japan Pro-Wrestling's pay-per-view event Capital Collision was held at the arena on May 14, 2022, April 15, 2023, and August 30, 2024.
- Blast Premier's Tier-1 Counter-Strike: Global Offensive event hosted the semi-finals and the final for their Spring Final series, June 10–12, 2023.
- WWE held its annual NXT Vengeance Day event at the arena on February 15, 2025.

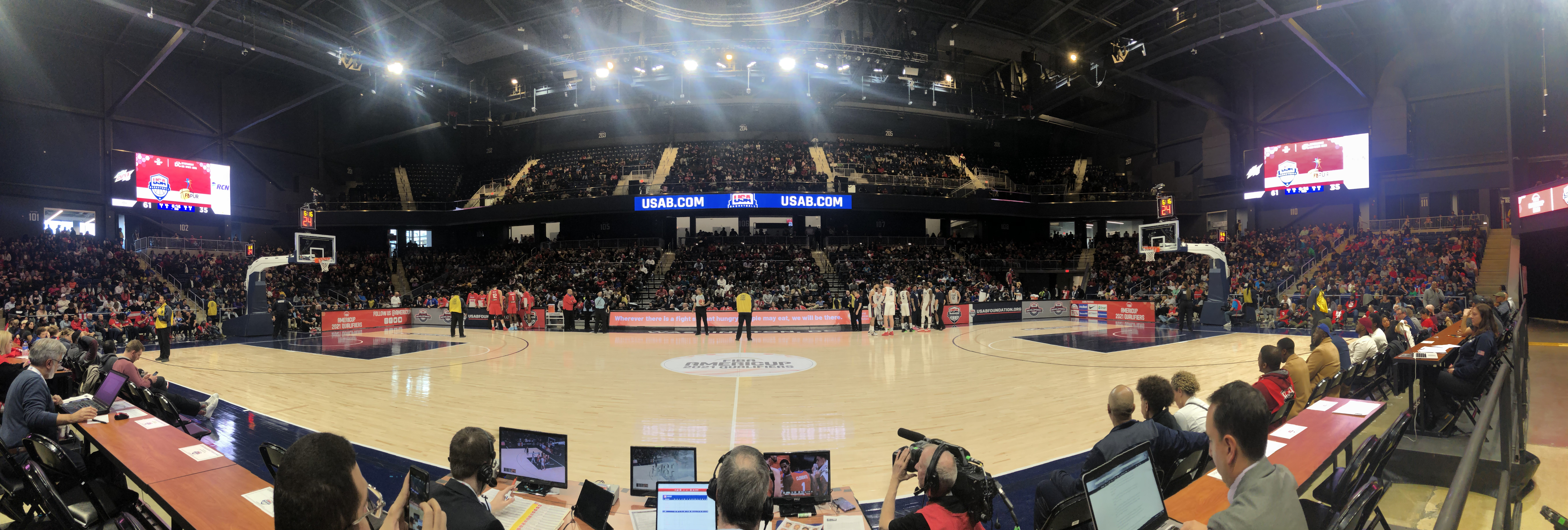
USA Basketball hosts Puerto Rico in an AmeriCup Qualifying Game in February 2020 at the arena.
